= Michel Pereira =

Brazilian mixed martial artist (born 1993)

- Born: Michel Fagner Lima Pereira; 6 October 1993 (age 33); Marabá, Pará, Brazil
- Other names: Demolidor
- Height: 6 ft 1 in (1.85 m)
- Weight: 185 lb (84 kg; 13 st 3 lb)
- Division: Welterweight (2011–2018, 2019–2022); Middleweight (2018–2019, 2023–present)
- Reach: 73 in (185 cm)
- Fighting out of: Las Vegas, Nevada, U.S.
- Team: Scorpion Fighting System/Team Demolidor; Overcome Academy (2020–present); Xtreme Couture
- Trainer: Rafael Alejarra
- Rank: Black belt in Brazilian Jiu-Jitsu under Sávio Roveno; Black belt in Karate under Rene Colares
- Years active: 2011–present

Mixed martial arts record
- Total: 49
- Wins: 32
- By knockout: 11
- By submission: 9
- By decision: 12
- Losses: 15
- By knockout: 3
- By submission: 1
- By decision: 10
- By disqualification: 1
- No contests: 2

Other information
- Mixed martial arts record from Sherdog

Michel Fagner Lima Pereira (born 6 October 1993) is a Brazilian professional mixed martial artist who competed in the middleweight division in the Ultimate Fighting Championship (UFC). A professional since 2011, he formerly competed for 300 Sparta, Akhmat Fight Club, Serbian Battle Championship, Jungle Fight, Xtreme Fighting Championships and Road Fighting Championship. He is a former Serbian Battle Championship welterweight champion.

== Background ==
Pereira was born in Tucumã, Pará, Brazil. He started training karate at the age of 12, complementing his skillset with Brazilian jiu-jitsu from the age of 16 onwards.

== Mixed martial arts career ==
=== Early career ===
Michel Pereira began his professional mixed martial arts career fighting in regional promotions of his native state of Brazil, Pará, as well as 300 Sparta, amassing a professional record of 9–3 with notable wins over the veterans Daziel da Silva Jr. and Silmar Nunes. These early wins earned a chance to fight with the bigger promotions. Such as Jungle Fight and XFC.

In his first fight and only fight with Jungle Fight, he faced Junior Orgulho. He won by a unanimous decision.

His next fight was a loss versus Junior de Oliveira with Iron Man CF. After a win against Caio Robson, Michel Pereira earned a contract with XFC. Fighting on the prelims of XFC International 7, Pereira faced Geraldo Coelho. Responding to his opponent's pressure with clinching and a takedown, Pereira ended the fight in the third round by way of a guillotine choke. His next fight was on the prelims of XFC International 9, during which he faced Cairo Rocha. With various techniques such as wheel kicks and flying knees, Michel earned a victory through a unanimous decision. These two victories gave him a main even fight against Carlston Harris, which Pereira lost through a unanimous decision.

Following this Pereira fought with various promotions during which he lost a decision against Abubakar Vagaev, Ismael de Jesus and Kurbanjiang Tuluosibake, while also netting wins against Stanley Barbosa by way of an arm triangle choke, as well decisions against Renato Gomes and Cristiano Estela Rios.

=== Serbian Battle Championship and Road FC ===
His 16–8 record earned him a chance to fight for the vacant SBC Welterweight Championship against Luka Strezoski at SBC 15 on 8 December 2017. Pereira won a majority decision. Pereira was scheduled to defend his SBC title against Laerte Costa at SBC 17 on 18 April 2018. He won the fight by a first-round rear naked choke submission.

Moving away from SBC, Pereira was scheduled to face Carlos Perira at Arena Fight 8 on 12 May 2018, in a 176 lbs catchweight bout. The fight ended in a no-contest, due to a cage malfunction.

His next fight was likewise a 176 lbs catchweight about, against Ryul Kim at HEAT 42 on 27 May 2018. The fight was Pereira's South Korean debut. Pereira won the fight by a first-round technical knockout. Pereira was next scheduled to face Hea Jun Yang at Road FC 48. He won the fight by a first-round technical knockout. Pereira remained on the South Korean circuit for his next fight, being scheduled to fight Batmunkh Burenzorig at HEAT 43 on 17 September 2018. Although he won the fight by a read-naked choke submission, the result was later overturned into a no-contest, due to Periera missing weight.

Pereira was scheduled to make his second SBC Middlweight title defense against Duško Todorović at SBC 19 on 1 December 2018. Todorović won the fight by a first-round technical knockout.

Periera was scheduled to face Won Jun Choi at Road FC 051 XX on 15 December 2018, in a 190 lbs catchweight bout. Pereira won the fight by a 41-second knockout. Pereira was scheduled to face the heavyweight Dae Sung Kim at Road FC 052 on 23 February 2019, in an openweight bout. Pereira beat Kim by a second-round technical knockout.

=== Ultimate Fighting Championship ===
Pereira's first fight in the UFC was scheduled for 18 May 2019 at UFC Fight Night 152 against Danny Roberts. Pereira utilized unorthodox striking techniques, including an attempted showtime kick, and superman punch, before winning the fight via knockout early in round one. Periera was awarded a Performance of the Night award.

Pereira's next fight was scheduled for UFC Fight Night 158 against Sergey Khandozhko. Sergey would face visa issues and was replaced by the Canadian Tristan Connelly. Pereira missed weight by 2 pounds. He lost the fight via unanimous decision. MMA Junkie would pick this fight as their "Upset of the Year". The fight was awarded a Fight of the Night award. for which Pereira was ineligible as he missed weight, which meant Pereira forfeited 30% of his purse, as well as his $50,000 share of the FOTN award

Pereira's third UFC opponent was Diego Sanchez whom he faced at UFC Fight Night 167 on 15 February 2020. Pereira dominated Sanchez for most of the fight but was disqualified for hitting Sanchez with an illegal knee while he was grounded.

Pereira faced Zelim Imadaev on 5 September 2020 at UFC Fight Night 176. There was controversy during the weigh-ins as Imadaev slapped Pereira in the face, and both had to be restrained by the event's staff. Pereira dominated the fight, and slapped Imadaev back several times, before winning the fight via submission in the third round. This win earned him a Performance of the Night award.

Pereira faced Khaos Williams on 19 December 2020 at UFC Fight Night 183. He won the fight via unanimous decision.

Pereira faced Niko Price on 10 July 2021 at UFC 264. He won the fight via unanimous decision.

Pereira was scheduled to face Muslim Salikhov on 15 January 2022 at UFC on ESPN 32. However, Salikhov withdrew from the bout for undisclosed reasons and the bout was cancelled.

Pereira fought André Fialho on 22 January 2022 at UFC 270. He won the fight by unanimous decision.

Pereira faced Santiago Ponzinibbio on 21 May 2022 at UFC Fight Night 206. He won the fight via split decision. This fight earned him the Fight of the Night award.

Pereira was scheduled to face Sean Brady on 25 March 2023, at UFC on ESPN 43. However, Brady pulled out in mid-February due to a torn groin and the bout was scrapped.

Pereira was scheduled to face Stephen Thompson on 29 July 2023 at UFC 291. However, at the weigh-ins, Pereira weighed at 174 pounds, 3 pounds over the non-title welterweight limit. As a result, the bout was scrapped.

After a 17-month layoff, Pereira was scheduled to return to the middleweight division, facing Marc-André Barriault on 14 October 2023, at UFC Fight Night 230. However, Barriault withdrew due to medical issues and was replaced by Andre Petroski. Pereira won the fight via technical knockout in the first round. This win earned him the Performance of the Night award.

Pereira faced Michal Oleksiejczuk on 9 March 2024, at UFC 299. He won the bout by a rear-naked choke submission. This fight earned him another Performance of the Night award.

Pereira was scheduled to face Makhmud Muradov on 4 May 2024, at UFC 301. However, Muradov withdrew due to an infection, and he was replaced by Ihor Potieria. He won the bout early in the bout via guillotine choke. This fight earned him another Performance of the Night award.

It was briefly announced that Pereira would face Roman Dolidze on 8 June 2024, at UFC on ESPN 57. However, Pereira claimed he never signed any contracts for the fight and the bout fell through.

Pereira was scheduled to face Anthony Hernandez on 14 September 2024 at UFC 306. However, the bout was rescheduled to 19 October 2024 to serve as the main event at UFC Fight Night 245. He lost the fight by technical knockout as a result of significant control time and ground strikes in the fifth round.

Pereira faced Abusupiyan Magomedov on 26 April 2025 at UFC on ESPN 66. He lost the fight by unanimous decision.

Pereira was scheduled to face Marco Tulio on 23 August 2025 at UFC Fight Night 257. However, Tulio withdrew from the fight for unknown reasons and was replaced by two-time Cage Fury Middleweight Champion Kyle Daukaus. He lost the fight via knockout in round one.

Pereira faced Zachary Reese on 21 February 2026 at UFC Fight Night 267. He won the fight by split decision. 9 out of 13 media outlets scored the bout for Reese.

Pereira faced Sharabutdin Magomedov on 27 June 2026 at UFC Fight Night 280. He lost the fight by unanimous decision. After the fight, Pereira publicly complained about referee Herb Dean's failure to deduct a point from Magomedov despite twice pulling his hair after several warnings; if a point had been deducted from Magomedov, the fight would have been scored a draw. Pereira was released from the UFC after the fight, having been offered a one-fight contract to fight Magomedov.

On 14 July 2026, following his recent loss, it was reported that Pereira was removed from the UFC roster.

== Championships and achievements ==
=== Mixed martial arts ===
- Ultimate Fighting Championship
  - Performance of the Night (Five times) vs. Danny Roberts, Zelim Imadaev, Andre Petroski, Michał Oleksiejczuk and Ihor Potieria
  - Fight of the Night (Two Times) vs. Tristan Connelly and Santiago Ponzinibbio
- Serbian Battle Championship
  - SBC Welterweight Championship (One time)
    - One successful title defence
- MMAjunkie.com
  - 2022 May Fight of the Month vs. Santiago Ponzinibbio

== Mixed martial arts record ==
Professional record breakdown
49 matches	32 wins	15 losses
By knockout	11	3
By submission	9	1
By decision	12	10
By disqualification	0	1
No contests	2	

Res.	Record	Opponent	Method	Event	Date	Round	Time	Location	Notes
Loss	32–15 (2)	Sharabutdin Magomedov	Decision (unanimous)	UFC Fight Night: Fiziev vs. Torres	27 June 2026	3	5:00	Baku, Azerbaijan	
Win	32–14 (2)	Zachary Reese	Decision (split)	UFC Fight Night: Strickland vs. Hernandez	21 February 2026	3	5:00	Houston, Texas, United States	
Loss	31–14 (2)	Kyle Daukaus	KO (punches and elbows)	UFC Fight Night: Walker vs. Zhang	23 August 2025	1	0:43	Shanghai, China	
Loss	31–13 (2)	Abusupiyan Magomedov	Decision (unanimous)	UFC on ESPN: Machado Garry vs. Prates	26 April 2025	3	5:00	Kansas City, Missouri, United States	
Loss	31–12 (2)	Anthony Hernandez	TKO (elbows)	UFC Fight Night: Hernandez vs. Pereira	19 October 2024	5	2:22	Las Vegas, Nevada, United States	
Win	31–11 (2)	Ihor Potieria	Submission (guillotine choke)	UFC 301	4 May 2024	1	0:54	Rio de Janeiro, Brazil	Performance of the Night.
Win	30–11 (2)	Michał Oleksiejczuk	Technical Submission (rear-naked choke)	UFC 299	9 March 2024	1	1:01	Miami, Florida, United States	Performance of the Night.
Win	29–11 (2)	Andre Petroski	TKO (punches)	UFC Fight Night: Yusuff vs. Barboza	14 October 2023	1	1:06	Las Vegas, Nevada, United States	Return to Middleweight. Performance of the Night.
Win	28–11 (2)	Santiago Ponzinibbio	Decision (split)	UFC Fight Night: Holm vs. Vieira	21 May 2022	3	5:00	Las Vegas, Nevada, United States	Fight of the Night.
Win	27–11 (2)	André Fialho	Decision (unanimous)	UFC 270	22 January 2022	3	5:00	Anaheim, California, United States	
Win	26–11 (2)	Niko Price	Decision (unanimous)	UFC 264	10 July 2021	3	5:00	Las Vegas, Nevada, United States	
Win	25–11 (2)	Khaos Williams	Decision (unanimous)	UFC Fight Night: Thompson vs. Neal	19 December 2020	3	5:00	Las Vegas, Nevada, United States	
Win	24–11 (2)	Zelim Imadaev	Technical Submission (rear-naked choke)	UFC Fight Night: Overeem vs. Sakai	5 September 2020	3	4:39	Las Vegas, Nevada, United States	Performance of the Night.
Loss	23–11 (2)	Diego Sanchez	DQ (illegal knee)	UFC Fight Night: Anderson vs. Błachowicz 2	15 February 2020	3	3:09	Rio Rancho, New Mexico, United States	
Loss	23–10 (2)	Tristan Connelly	Decision (unanimous)	UFC Fight Night: Cowboy vs. Gaethje	14 September 2019	3	5:00	Vancouver, British Columbia, Canada	Catchweight (172 lb) bout; Pereira missed weight. Fight of the Night.
Win	23–9 (2)	Danny Roberts	KO (flying knee and punch)	UFC Fight Night: dos Anjos vs. Lee	18 May 2019	1	1:47	Rochester, New York, United States	Return to Welterweight. Performance of the Night.
Win	22–9 (2)	Kim Sung-dae	TKO (punches and knees)	Road FC 052	23 February 2019	2	1:02	Seoul, South Korea	Openweight bout.
Win	21–9 (2)	Choi Won-jun	KO (punch)	Road FC 051	15 December 2018	1	0:41	Seoul, South Korea	Catchweight (190 lb) bout.
Loss	20–9 (2)	Duško Todorović	TKO (punches)	Serbian Battle Championship 19	1 December 2018	1	4:32	Novi Sad, Serbia	For the vacant SBC Middleweight Championship.
NC	20–8 (2)	Batmunkh Burenzorig	NC (missed weight)	HEAT 43	17 September 2018	5	1:46	Aichi, Japan	For the vacant HEAT Welterweight Championship. Pereira missed weight (185.5 lb) and was ineligible for the title. Originally a submission (rear-naked choke) win for Pereira; overturned due to him missing weight.
Win	20–8 (1)	Yang Hea-jun	TKO (knee and punches)	Road FC 048	28 July 2018	3	1:48	Wonju, South Korea	Middleweight debut.
Win	19–8 (1)	Kim Ryul	TKO (punches)	HEAT 42	27 May 2018	1	0:51	Aichi, Japan	Catchweight (176 lb) bout.
NC	18–8 (1)	Carlos Perira	NC (cage malfunction)	Arena Fight 8	12 May 2018	1	2:52	Redenção, Brazil	Catchweight (176 lb) bout.
Win	18–8	Laerte Costa	Submission (rear-naked choke)	Serbian Battle Championship 17	28 April 2018	1	4:02	Odžaci, Serbia	Defended the SBC Welterweight Championship.
Win	17–8	Luka Strezoski	Decision (majority)	Serbian Battle Championship 15	8 December 2017	3	5:00	Novi Sad, Serbia	Won the vacant SBC Welterweight Championship.
Loss	16–8	Kurbanjiang Tuluosibake	Decision (unanimous)	Kunlun Fight MMA 15	3 October 2017	3	5:00	Alashan, China	
Win	16–7	Renato Gomes	Submission (triangle choke)	Taura MMA 1	16 September 2017	3	0:54	Viamão, Brazil	
Win	15–7	Cristiano Estela Rios	Decision (unanimous)	Fusion FC 24	21 December 2016	3	5:00	Lima, Peru	
Loss	14–7	Ismael de Jesus	Decision (unanimous)	Shooto Brasil 67	11 November 2016	3	5:00	Rio de Janeiro, Brazil	For the Shooto Brazil Welterweight Championship.
Win	14–6	Stanley Barbosa	Submission (arm-triangle choke)	Revelation FC 4	13 May 2016	1	4:56	Belém, Brazil	
Loss	13–6	Abubakar Vagaev	Decision (unanimous)	Akhmat Fight Show 18	9 April 2016	3	5:00	Grozny, Russia	
Loss	13–5	Carlston Harris	Decision (unanimous)	XFC International 12	28 November 2015	3	5:00	São Paulo, Brazil	XFC Welterweight Tournament Final.
Win	13–4	Cairo Rocha	Decision (unanimous)	XFC International 9	14 March 2015	5	5:00	São Paulo, Brazil	XFC Welterweight Tournament Semifinal.
Win	12–4	Geraldo Coelho	Submission (guillotine choke)	XFC International 7	1 November 2014	1	2:40	São Paulo, Brazil	XFC Welterweight Tournament Quarterfinal.
Win	11–4	Caio Robson Silva	TKO (retirement)	Arena Fight 6	31 May 2014	1	5:00	Redenção, Brazil	
Loss	10–4	Zozimar de Oliveria Silva Jr.	Submission (armbar)	Iron Man MMA 18	24 May 2014	2	5:00	Belém, Brazil	
Win	10–3	Alfredo Souza	Decision (unanimous)	Jungle Fight 65	2 February 2014	3	5:00	Madre de Deus, Brazil	
Win	9–3	Silmar Nunes	Submission (triangle choke)	Tucumã Fighting Show 5	21 December 2013	1	4:18	Tucumã, Brazil	
Win	8–3	Jaime Cordoba	Decision (unanimous)	300 Sparta 4	10 October 2013	3	5:00	Lima, Peru	Return to Welterweight.
Win	7–3	Daziel Serafrim da Silva Jr.	Decision (unanimous)	The Green Fight: Paragominas	28 September 2013	3	5:00	Paragominas, Brazil	
Win	6–3	Renato Puente Flores	Submission (armbar)	300 Sparta 3	16 September 2013	1	5:00	Lima, Peru	
Win	5–3	Reginaldo Ferreira Alves	TKO (punches)	Arena Sport Combat 1	10 August 2013	1	4:12	Xinguara, Brazil	
Win	4–3	Franciney dos Santos Bessa	TKO (doctor stoppage)	Marajó Fight 5	13 July 2013	1	1:52	Soure, Brazil	
Loss	3–3	Rubenilton Perreira	Decision (unanimous)	MMA Dragon Fighters 1	6 April 2013	3	5:00	Ourilândia do Norte, Brazil	
Loss	3–2	Rubenilton Perreira	Decision (unanimous)	Tucumã Fighting Show 3	30 March 2013	3	5:00	Tucumã, Brazil	
Loss	3–1	Bruno Leandro Soares	Decision (unanimous)	Colisão Top Fight	12 January 2013	3	5:00	Tucumã, Brazil	
Win	3–0	Sivaldo Alves da Silva	Decision (unanimous)	Tucumã Fighting Show 2	15 June 2012	3	5:00	Tucumã, Brazil	
Win	2–0	Magno Silva	TKO (punches)	Tucumã Fighting Show 1	21 January 2012	2	5:00	Tucumã, Brazil	Lightweight debut.
Win	1–0	Edson Dias	TKO (punches)	Dragon Fight Championship 6	22 December 2011	1	3:20	Ourilândia do Norte, Brazil	Welterweight debut.

== See also ==
- List of male mixed martial artists
