= Matt Hobar =

American mixed martial arts fighter

- Born: January 7, 1987 (age 39); Dallas, Texas, United States
- Other names: The Crowbar
- Nationality: American
- Height: 5 ft 10 in (1.78 m)
- Weight: 135 lb (61 kg; 9.6 st)
- Division: Bantamweight
- Reach: 70.0 in (178 cm)
- Fighting out of: Dallas, Texas, United States
- Team: Octagon MMA
- Years active: 2011–2016

Mixed martial arts record
- Total: 12
- Wins: 9
- By knockout: 1
- By submission: 4
- By decision: 4
- Losses: 3
- By knockout: 2
- By decision: 1

Other information
- Spouse: MaKenzie Srygley
- Mixed martial arts record from Sherdog

Matthew Hobar (born January 7, 1987) is an American retired mixed martial artist who competed in the UFC's bantamweight division. A professional competitor since 2011, Hobar also formerly competed for Legacy Fighting Championship and Shark Fights. He is the former Legacy FC bantamweight champion.

== Mixed martial arts career ==
=== Early career ===
Hobar compiled a 5–0 record in smaller organizations before signing with Legacy Fighting Championship.

=== Legacy Fighting Championship ===
Hobar faced Steven Peterson at Legacy FC 13 on August 17, 2012. He lost the fight via TKO due to an arm injury in the first round.

A rematch with Steven Peterson took place at Legacy FC 16 on December 14, 2012. He won the fight via majority decision.

He next faced Nelson Salas at Legacy FC 19 on April 12, 2013. He won the fight via unanimous decision.

Hobar faced Angel Huerta for the vacant Legacy FC bantamweight championship at Legacy FC 21 on July 19, 2013. He won the fight via rear-naked choke submission in the first round.

=== Ultimate Fighting Championship ===
Hobar stepped in as a replacement for Wilson Reis to face Pedro Munhoz at The Ultimate Fighter Brazil 3 Finale: Miocic vs. Maldonado on May 31, 2014. He lost the fight via TKO in the first round.

Hobar faced Aaron Phillips at UFC Fight Night: Henderson vs. dos Anjos on August 23, 2014. He won the fight via unanimous decision.

Hobar faced Sergio Pettis at UFC 181 on December 6, 2014. He lost the fight via unanimous decision. The bout earned Hobar a Fight of the Night bonus award.

Hobar was expected to face Norifumi Yamamoto on September 27, 2015 at UFC Fight Night 75. However, the bout was scrapped as both fighters suffered injuries during the week leading up to the event.

Matt Hobar officially retired July 2016 due to neck injuries.

== Championships and accomplishments ==
- Ultimate Fighting Championship
  - Fight of the Night (one time) vs. Sergio Pettis
- Legacy Fighting Championship
  - Legacy FC bantamweight championship (one time)

== Mixed martial arts record ==
Professional record breakdown
12 matches	9 wins	3 losses
By knockout	1	2
By submission	4	0
By decision	4	1

Res.	Record	Opponent	Method	Event	Date	Round	Time	Location	Notes
Loss	9–3	Sergio Pettis	Decision (unanimous)	UFC 181	December 6, 2014	3	5:00	Las Vegas, Nevada, United States	Fight of the Night.
Win	9–2	Aaron Phillips	Decision (unanimous)	UFC Fight Night: Henderson vs. dos Anjos	August 23, 2014	3	5:00	Tulsa, Oklahoma, United States	
Loss	8–2	Pedro Munhoz	TKO (punches)	The Ultimate Fighter Brazil 3 Finale: Miocic vs. Maldonado	May 31, 2014	1	2:47	São Paulo, Brazil	
Win	8–1	Angel Huerta	Submission (rear-naked choke)	Legacy FC 21	July 19, 2013	1	3:05	Houston, Texas, United States	Won vacant Legacy FC bantamweight championship.
Win	7–1	Nelson Salas	Decision (unanimous)	Legacy FC 19	April 12, 2013	3	5:00	Dallas, Texas, United States	
Win	6–1	Steven Peterson	Decision (majority)	Legacy FC 16	December 14, 2012	3	5:00	Dallas, Texas, United States	
Loss	5–1	Steven Peterson	TKO (arm injury)	Legacy FC 13	August 17, 2012	1	4:04	Dallas, Texas, United States	
Win	5–0	Aaron Cerda	Decision (unanimous)	24/7 Entertainment 5: America's Most Wanted	June 30, 2012	3	3:00	Odessa, Texas, United States	Catchweight (140 lbs) bout.
Win	4–0	Marcus Baldivia	Submission (north-south choke)	Shark Fights 21: Knothe vs. Lashley	November 11, 2011	1	0:53	Lubbock, Texas, United States	
Win	3–0	Jay Flores	Submission (rear-naked choke)	Shark Fights 17: Horwich vs. Rosholt 2	July 15, 2011	1	1:55	Frisco, Texas, United States	
Win	2–0	Joshua Davison	TKO (punches)	24/7 Entertainment 1: Professional Cage Fighting	April 8, 2011	1	0:53	Midland, Texas, United States	
Win	1–0	Jeremy Gauna	Submission (rear-naked choke)	Shark Fights 14: Horwich vs. Villefort	March 11, 2011	2	2:16	Lubbock, Texas, United States	Catchweight (150 lbs) bout.

== See also ==
- List of current UFC fighters
- List of male mixed martial artists
