= Chris Fishgold =

English mixed martial arts fighter

- Born: 6 June 1992 (age 34); Liverpool, England
- Height: 5 ft 8 in (1.73 m)
- Weight: 149 lb (68 kg; 10 st 9 lb)
- Division: Featherweight; Lightweight
- Reach: 68 in (173 cm)
- Fighting out of: Liverpool, England
- Team: Next Generation MMA UK
- Rank: Black belt in Brazilian Jiu-Jitsu under Paul Rimmer
- Years active: 2010–present

Kickboxing record
- Total: 2
- No contests: 2

Mixed martial arts record
- Total: 25
- Wins: 18
- By knockout: 2
- By submission: 13
- By decision: 3
- Losses: 6
- By knockout: 3
- By submission: 1
- By decision: 2
- Draws: 1

Other information
- Mixed martial arts record from Sherdog

Chris Fishgold (born 6 June 1992) is an English mixed martial artist (MMA). Fishgold is the former Cage Warriors lightweight champion. He currently competes in the featherweight division in Bare Knuckle Fighting Championship (BKFC).

== Background ==
Fishgold started his first combat sport training at the age of 16 and knew he wanted master the sport after getting choked out by his teammate half his size on his first class in Ju-Jitsu class. He picked up Muay Thai and competed in mma professionally not longer after.

== Mixed martial arts career ==
=== Early career ===
Fishgold started his professional MMA career since 2010 and fought under various promoters primarily in England. He is the former lightweight Cage Warriors champion and he amassed a record of 17–1–1 prior signed by UFC.

=== Ultimate Fighting Championship ===
Fishgold made his promotional debut on 27 October 2018 at UFC Fight Night 138, facing Calvin Kattar. He lost the fight via technical knockout in the first round.

His second UFC fight came on 23 February 2019 against Daniel Teymur at UFC Fight Night: Błachowicz vs. Santos. He won the fight via submission in the second round.

Fishgold faced Makwan Amirkhani at UFC Fight Night: Gustafsson vs. Smith on 1 June 2019. He lost the fight via anaconda choke submission in the second round.

Fishgold was expected to face promotional newcomer Billy Quarantillo on 7 December 2019 at UFC on ESPN 7, but withdrew from the fight due to undisclosed reasons.

Fishgold faced Jared Gordon on 16 July 2020 at UFC on ESPN: Kattar vs. Ige. At the weigh-ins, Fishgold weighed in at 149 pounds, 3 pounds over the featherweight non-title fight limit. He was fined 20% of the purse which went to his opponent Gordon and their bout proceeded at catchweight. Fishgold lost the fight via unanimous decision. After the loss, he parted ways with the promotion.

=== Post UFC ===
In his first bout post-UFC, Fishgold faced Adrian Kępa on March 12, 2023 at Levels Fight League 8, losing by TKO stoppage due to a rib injury at the end of the first round.

== Bare-knuckle boxing ==
On 20 August 2022 Fishgold debuted for Bare Knuckle Fighting Championship at BKFC 27 in the middleweight division and lost by KO in round 2 to Jake Bostwick.

== Championships and accomplishments ==
- Cage Warriors
  - Cage Warriors Lightweight Champion (One time, former)
    - Three successful title defenses

== Mixed martial arts record ==
Professional record breakdown
25 matches	18 wins	6 losses
By knockout	2	3
By submission	13	1
By decision	3	2
Draws	1	

Res.	Record	Opponent	Method	Event	Date	Round	Time	Location	Notes
Loss	18–6–1	Cezary Oleksiejczuk	TKO (punches)	FEN 51	14 October 2023	1	1:11	Lubin, Poland	Catchweight (174 lb) bout.
Loss	18–5–1	Adrian Kępa	TKO (rib injury)	Levels Fight League 8	12 March 2023	1	5:00	Amsterdam, Netherlands	Welterweight debut.
Loss	18–4–1	Jared Gordon	Decision (unanimous)	UFC on ESPN: Kattar vs. Ige	16 July 2020	3	5:00	Abu Dhabi, United Arab Emirates	Catchweight (149 lb) bout; Fishgold missed weight.
Loss	18–3–1	Makwan Amirkhani	Submission (anaconda choke)	UFC Fight Night: Gustafsson vs. Smith	1 June 2019	2	4:25	Stockholm, Sweden	
Win	18–2–1	Daniel Teymur	Submission (rear-naked choke)	UFC Fight Night: Błachowicz vs. Santos	23 February 2019	2	1:10	Prague, Czech Republic	
Loss	17–2–1	Calvin Kattar	TKO (punches)	UFC Fight Night: Volkan vs. Smith	27 October 2018	1	4:11	Moncton, New Brunswick, Canada	Return to Featherweight.
Win	17–1–1	Alexander Jacobsen	Submission (rear-naked choke)	Cage Warriors 88	28 October 2017	1	4:15	Liverpool, England	Defended the Cage Warriors Lightweight Championship.
Win	16–1–1	Nic Herron-Webb	Decision (unanimous)	Cage Warriors Unplugged	12 November 2016	5	5:00	London, England	Defended the Cage Warriors Lightweight Championship.
Win	15–1–1	Jason Ponet	Submission (guillotine choke)	Cage Warriors 78	10 September 2016	1	1:04	Liverpool, England	Defended the Cage Warriors Lightweight Championship.
Win	14–1–1	Adam Boussif	Submission (rear-naked choke)	Cage Warriors 77	8 July 2016	1	1:33	London, England	Won the vacant Cage Warriors Lightweight Championship.
Win	13–1–1	Jordan Miller	Submission (guillotine choke)	Cage Warriors 75	15 April 2016	1	1:04	London, England	
Win	12–1–1	Alejandro Ferreira	TKO (punches)	ICE Fighting Championships 11	20 February 2016	1	0:00	Liverpool, England	
Win	11–1–1	Benjamin Baudrier	Submission (guillotine choke)	ICE Fighting Championship 9	20 November 2015	1	0:00	Manchester, England	
Draw	10–1–1	Ryan Roddy	Draw (majority)	Made 4 the Cage 18	28 September 2015	3	5:00	Newcastle, England	
Loss	10–1	Gi Bum Moon	Decision (unanimous)	PRO FC 10	9 May 2015	3	5:00	Taipei, Taiwan	
Win	10–0	Olivier Pastor	Decision (unanimous)	Cage Warriors 62	7 December 2013	3	5:00	Newcastle, England	
Win	9–0	Marcin Wrzosek	TKO (punches and elbows)	Cage Warriors 57	20 July 2013	2	3:31	London, England	
Win	8–0	Steve O'Keefe	Submission (guillotine choke)	Cage Warriors 52	29 March 2013	1	1:34	London, England	
Win	7–0	Andy DeVent	Submission (rear-naked choke)	Cage Conflict 11	29 October 2011	2	0:00	Liverpool, England	
Win	6–0	Jeremy Petley	Submission (rear-naked choke)	BAMMA 7	10 September 2011	1	4:33	Birmingham, England	
Win	5–0	Danny Welsh	Submission (rear-naked choke)	OMMAC 10	4 June 2011	1	1:08	Liverpool, England	
Win	4–0	Ben Rose	Decision (unanimous)	Night of the Gladiators 7	12 March 2011	3	5:00	Staffordshire, England	
Win	3–0	Jules Willis	Submission (guillotine choke)	OMMAC 6	7 August 2010	1	1:34	Liverpool, England	
Win	2–0	Phil Flynn	Submission (armbar)	Cage Conflict 5	8 May 2010	2	0:00	Accrington, England	
Win	1–0	Neil McGuigan	Submission (rear-naked choke)	OMMAC 4	6 March 2010	1	3:33	Liverpool, England	

== Bare knuckle record ==
Professional record breakdown
1 match	0 wins	1 loss
By knockout	0	1

Res.	Record	Opponent	Method	Event	Date	Round	Time	Location	Notes
Loss	0-1	Jake Bostwick	KO	BKFC 27	August 20, 2022	2	1:59	London, England	Middleweight bout

== See also ==
- List of male mixed martial artists
