= UFC Fight Night: Cowboy vs. Gaethje =

UFC mixed martial arts event in 2019

- The poster for UFC Fight Night: Cowboy vs. Gaethje
- Promotion: Ultimate Fighting Championship
- Date: September 14, 2019
- Venue: Rogers Arena
- City: Vancouver, British Columbia, Canada
- Attendance: 15,114
- Total gate: $1,334,931.56

Event chronology
UFC 242: Khabib vs. Poirier	UFC Fight Night: Cowboy vs. Gaethje	UFC Fight Night: Rodríguez vs. Stephens

UFC Fight Night: Cowboy vs. Gaethje (also known as UFC Fight Night 158 or UFC on ESPN+ 16) was a mixed martial arts event produced by the Ultimate Fighting Championship that took place on September 14, 2019 at Rogers Arena in Vancouver, British Columbia, Canada.

== Background ==
A lightweight bout between former UFC Lightweight Championship challenger Donald Cerrone and former WSOF Lightweight Champion Justin Gaethje served as the event's headliner.

A middleweight bout between former WSOF Middleweight and Light Heavyweight Champion David Branch and The Ultimate Fighter: Team Joanna vs. Team Cláudia light heavyweight winner Andrew Sanchez was scheduled for the event. However, it was reported that Branch was forced to pull out of the event due to injury and was replaced by Marvin Vettori. In turn, it was reported that Sanchez was forced to pull out of the event due to an eye infection, resulting in cancellation of the bout. In turn, the pairing was left intact and was rescheduled a month later at UFC Fight Night: Joanna vs. Waterson.

A welterweight bout between Michel Pereira and Sergey Khandozhko was scheduled for the event. However, it was reported that Khandozhko was removed from the card due to visa issues. He was replaced by promotional newcomer Tristan Connelly. At the weigh-ins, Pereira weighed in at 172 pounds, 1 pound over the welterweight non-title fight limit of 171. He was fined 20% of his purse and his bout with Connelly proceeded at a catchweight.

== Results ==
Main Card (ESPN+)
Weight class				Method	Round	Time	Notes
Lightweight	Justin Gaethje	def.	Donald Cerrone	TKO (punches)	1	4:18
Light Heavyweight	Glover Teixeira	def.	Nikita Krylov	Decision (split) (28–29, 29–28, 29–28)	3	5:00
Heavyweight	Todd Duffee	vs.	Jeff Hughes	No Contest (accidental eye poke)	1	4:03	(Note: An accidental eye poke rendered Duffee unable to continue.)
Catchweight (172 lb)	Tristan Connelly	def.	Michel Pereira	Decision (unanimous) (29–28, 29–27, 29–27)	3	5:00
Middleweight	Uriah Hall	def.	Antônio Carlos Júnior	Decision (split) (29–28, 28–29, 29–28)	3	5:00
Light Heavyweight	Misha Cirkunov	def.	Jimmy Crute	Submission (peruvian necktie)	1	3:38
Preliminary Card (ESPN+)
Heavyweight	Augusto Sakai	def.	Marcin Tybura	KO (punches)	1	0:59
Bantamweight	Miles Johns	def.	Cole Smith	Decision (split) (28–29, 29–28, 29–28)	3	5:00
Bantamweight	Hunter Azure	def.	Brad Katona	Decision (unanimous) (29–28, 30–27, 29–28)	3	5:00
Featherweight	Chas Skelly	def.	Jordan Griffin	Decision (unanimous) (29–28, 29–28, 29–28)	3	5:00
Bantamweight	Louis Smolka	def.	Ryan MacDonald	TKO (punches)	1	4:43
Lightweight	Austin Hubbard	def.	Kyle Prepolec	Decision (unanimous) (29–28, 29–28, 29–28)	3	5:00

== Bonus awards ==
The following fighters received $50,000 bonuses.

- Fight of the Night: Tristan Connelly vs. Michel Pereira (Michel Pereira was ineligible to receive any bonus money due to missing weight, therefore Tristan Connelly received a $100,000 bonus.)
- Performance of the Night: Justin Gaethje and Misha Cirkunov

== See also ==
- List of UFC events
- 2019 in UFC
- List of current UFC fighters
