= Makwan Amirkhani =

Finnish mixed martial artist

- Born: November 8, 1988 (age 38); Kermanshah, Iran
- Other names: Mr. Finland
- Nationality: Finnish
- Height: 5 ft 10 in (178 cm)
- Weight: 146 lb (66 kg; 10 st 6 lb)
- Division: Lightweight; Featherweight; Bantamweight
- Reach: 72 in (180 cm)
- Style: Wrestling, Submission Wrestling
- Fighting out of: Raisio, Finland
- Team: Finnfighters' Gym (formerly); TuTo (formerly); Turku Muay Thai (2014); Allstars Training Center (2014–2015); SBG Ireland (2016–2021); MA Training Center (2021–present)
- Years active: 2010–present

Mixed martial arts record
- Total: 31
- Wins: 20
- By knockout: 1
- By submission: 14
- By decision: 5
- Losses: 11
- By knockout: 4
- By submission: 3
- By decision: 4

Other information
- Boxing record from BoxRec
- Mixed martial arts record from Sherdog

Makwan Amirkhani (Kurdish: ماکوان ئەمیرخانی; born November 8, 1988) is a Finnish mixed martial artist who competes in the lightweight and featherweight division. He is most notable for his time in the Ultimate Fighting Championship. He is the current Ice Cage lightweight champion.

== Background ==
Amirkhani was born in Kermanshah, Iran into a Kurdish family. The family fled from Iran to Iraq and settled in UNHCR's Al-Tash refugee camp. In the aftermath of the Iran–Iraq War, the family were resettled to Vaasa, Finland, around 1993. Growing up as a small-sized immigrant in Vaasa, Amirkhani was subjected to serious physical and mental bullying from daycare up until the upper comprehensive school. He moved with his family to Turku in 2004, where he went to the upper comprehensive school. Amirkhani moved to Kotka to study in a high school suited for students with professional sports aspirations. However, he dropped out of the school and moved back to Turku where he failed to graduate from high schools twice. Eventually on a third try, he was accepted to study in Pajulahti Sports Institute from where he graduated.

His background is in amateur wrestling, having trained since a young age, competing for the Finnish national team; winning silver in the Finnish National Championship in Freestyle in 2010 and bronze in 2013 in Greco-Roman wrestling.

== Mixed martial arts career ==
=== Early career ===
Amirkhani began training in mixed martial arts at the age of 16 and had his first professional fight in 2010. Competing on the regional circuit solely in Finland, he compiled a record of 10–2, with eight finishes, all by submission and all in the first round, before signing with the UFC in December 2014.

=== Ultimate Fighting Championship ===
Amirkhani made his promotional debut against Andy Ogle on 24 January 2015 at UFC on Fox 14. He won the fight via TKO only 8 seconds into the first round. He also earned a Performance of the Night bonus.

Amirkhani was briefly linked to a bout with Diego Rivas on 20 June 2015 at UFC Fight Night 69. However, shortly after the bout was announced, Rivas was pulled from the fight due to undisclosed reasons and replaced by Masio Fullen. Amirkhani won the fight by submission due to a rear naked choke in the first round.

Amirkhani faced Mike Wilkinson on 27 February 2016, at UFC Fight Night 84. He won the fight by unanimous decision.

In January 2017, Amirkhani signed a new, four-fight contract with the UFC. In the first bout he faced Arnold Allen on 18 March 2017 at UFC Fight Night 107. He lost the fight by split decision.

Amirkhani faced Jason Knight on 27 May 2018 at UFC Fight Night 130 Amirkhani won the back-and-forth fight via split decision, after being knocked down twice with uppercuts.

Amirkhani faced Chris Fishgold at UFC Fight Night: Gustafsson vs. Smith on 1 June 2019. He won the fight via an anaconda choke submission in the second round. The win also earned Amirkhani his second Performance of the Night bonus award.

Amirkhani faced Shane Burgos on 2 November 2019 at UFC 244. He lost the fight via TKO in the third round.

Amirkhani was expected to face Mike Grundy at UFC Fight Night: Woodley vs. Edwards on 21 March 2020. Due to the COVID-19 pandemic, the event was eventually postponed and the bout scrapped. Instead Amirkhani faced Danny Henry on 12 July 2020 at UFC 251. He won the fight via a submission in round one.

Amirkhani faced Edson Barboza, replacing Sodiq Yusuff, on 11 October 2020 at UFC Fight Night 179. He lost the fight via unanimous decision.

Amirkhani was scheduled to face Nate Landwehr on 5 June 2021 at UFC Fight Night 189. However, Landwehr was pulled from the event due to injury and he was replaced by newcomer Kamuela Kirk. Amirkhani lost the bout via unanimous decision.

Amirkhani was scheduled to face Tristan Connelly on 30 October 2021 at UFC 267. However, Connelly withdrew in early September due to a neck injury and was replaced by Lerone Murphy. Amirkhani lost the bout via knock out with a knee after getting caught shooting for a takedown at the beginning of the second round.

Amirkhani faced Mike Grundy at UFC Fight Night 204 on 19 March 2022, in a rebooked bout after almost two years to date when they were originally set to compete. Amirkhani won the fight via a technical submission with an Anaconda choke in round one. With this win, he received the Performance of the Night award.

Amirkhani faced Jonathan Pearce on 23 July 2022, at UFC Fight Night 208. He lost the bout via TKO in the second round.

Amirkhani faced Jack Shore on 18 March 2023, at UFC 286. He lost the fight via a rear-naked choke submission in the second round.

On 5 June 2023, news surfaced that Amirkhani had fought out his contract and the organization opted not to renew it.

=== Post-UFC career ===
On 12 August 2023, Amirkhani announced that he had signed a contract to fight in Oktagon MMA and expected to make his promotional debut in lightweight division during 2023. He also revealed that he will partake the promotion's upcoming million euro tournament in 2024. After getting knocked out at the beginning of the third round against Mochamed Machaev, Amirkhani announced his intention to retire from the sport.

After his loss, he expressed a desire to return to fight one last time and pleaded his fans to vote him as one of two “lucky losers”, who would then re-enter the tournament in a reserve match. Subsequently, the Kurdish Amirkhani and Turkish Attila Korkmaz got picked and were set to face each other at Oktagon 58. Amirkhani (hinting at the Kurdish-Turkish conflict) stated prior to the bout in a post on his personal Instagram page that the match between him and Korkmaz is “more important than all the fights combined” and told his Kurdish fans to fill the arena with Kurdish nationalist colours. Amirkhani lost the match after being picked up and slammed into the canvas by Korkmaz and submitted via a rear-naked choke in the third round. The aforementioned slam had caused Amirkhani to dislocate his glenohumeral joint; the rotator cuff had also punctured and required extensive surgery. After the operation, he expressed uncertainty about returning to fighting.

Later, it was announced that Amirkhani was scheduled to fight in a local Finnish promotion called Ice Cage Fighting. His bout against Fernando Flores was the main event of Ice Cage Fighting 3, which took place on 28 December 2024. He won the match by submission.

He was scheduled to fight Diego Santos on 25 January 2025 in the Czech 'Professional Muaythai League'. He missed weight and later pulled out due to flu symptoms.

He was scheduled to fight against Joni Salovaara on 3 May 2025 at Ice Cage Fighting 4. He won the match via unanimous decision.

He was scheduled to fight against Theo Kolehmainen on 6 August 2025 at Ice Cage Fighting 5, a championship bout for the lightweight belt. He won the match by submission and became the Ice Cage lightweight champion.

== Professional grappling career ==
Amirkhani competed in the ADCC North European Open on August 18, 2023, where he went 3-1 and won a bronze medal in the 76 kg division.

== Business ventures ==
Amirkhani owns 25% of the shares in Ice Cage Fighting.

== Personal life ==
Amirkhani is one of eight children; his brother and father both died in car accidents shortly after the family moved to Finland.

Makwan has worked as a model and was the runner-up in 2012 Mr. Finland pageant, which his nickname refers to.

Makwan and his partner have a son (born 2022).

Amirkhani has acquired Finnish citizenship.

== Controversies ==
=== Threats and slander ===
On July 12, 2021, several Finnish newspapers reported that Jethro Rostedt, a then 45 year-old Finnish real estate agent and Turku city council member, filed a criminal report against Amirkhani due to threats and slander. In a Facebook post that Amirkhani quickly deleted, he threatened Rostedt with violence and expressed disparaging comments about him and his son after he seemingly became irritated by Rostedt who shared his opinion on a gang fight involving Amirkhani's sister and dozens of other people of foreign background that occurred in a restaurant that Rostedt owns.

=== Speeding ===
In January 2025, Amirkhani was fined €3,300 for driving 130 km/h in a 60 km/h construction site.

=== Sexual violence ===
Amirkhan has been in court two times for sex offences, in 2006-2007 and 2014, both times acquitted. In August 2025, Mira Luoti, a singer and member of Finnish pop rock band PMMP, recounted how she had experienced sexual violence during the filming of a TV show, and according to Helsingin Sanomat, Luoti was referring to a "survival show" that aired in 2017 in which she was paired with Amirkhani. Helsingin Sanomat also reported that it had been informed of an email the show's production company had sent to Luoti at the time of the incident apologising to her for experiencing "unpleasant situations on the part of [Amirkhani]". Luoti was compensated an amount triple her initial earnings by the production company in order to "remove the issue from the agenda". After the issue became widespread, on 24 August 2025, Amirkhani shared a post on his personal Instagram account stating, "serious claims have been said about me that are not true", "I've apologised before for my negative behaviour during the filming of a TV show years ago, but I definitely deny having committed any unlawful act". On 30 August 2025, at a press conference for Ice Cage 5, Amirkhani got into a verbal altercation with Joni "Stagala" Takala, another fighter on the card, after the latter told him to raise his voice to which Amirkhani replied, "I speak in the tone of voice I want. Is that clear?", followed by "don’t you ever say anything when I'm talking again", after which Stagala said, "Did you say those same words to Mira Luoti?". Amirkhani got visibly upset, stood up and walked towards Stagala in a threatening manner and after a short reprehension sat back down in his seat. In April 2026, Amirkhani was sued for indecent assault. The plaintiff in the case was Mira Luoti. The proceedings were scheduled to begin on 26 October 2026. According to Yle, two additional charges were brought against him by two other women. One for rape and another one for attempted rape, but having expired the limitation period, both charges were subsequently dismissed by the court.

== Amateur boxing ==
Makwan Amirkhani has fought five times in amateur boxing. He would have had his fifth fight in December 2018 in Somero instead of January 2019, had he not refused a new replacement opponent who was an experienced and heavier boxer.

== Championships and accomplishments ==
=== Mixed martial arts ===
- Ultimate Fighting Championship
  - Performance of the Night (Three times) vs. Andy Ogle, Chris Fishgold and Mike Grundy
  - Tied (Daniel Pineda, Chas Skelly, Brian Ortega & Youssef Zalal) for second most submissions in UFC Featherweight division history (4)
  - Tied (Vicente Luque & Charles Oliveira) for most anaconda choke submission wins in UFC history (3)
  - UFC.com Awards
    - 2015: Ranked #5 Newcomer of the Year & Half-Year Awards: Best Newcomer of the 1HY
- Nordic MMA Awards - MMAviking.com
  - 2012 Showman of the Year
  - 2015 Knockout of the Year vs. Andy Ogle on January 24
  - 2015 Fighter of the Year

=== Amateur wrestling ===
- Finnish Wrestling Federation
  - 2008 Finnish Nationals 66 kg (145,5 lbs) Freestyle Wrestling Bronze medalist
  - 2010 Finnish Nationals 66 kg (145,5 lbs) Freestyle Wrestling Silver medalist
  - 2013 Finnish Nationals 66 kg (145,5 lbs) Greco-Roman Wrestling Bronze medalist
  - 2016 Finnish Nationals 74 kg (163 lbs) Freestyle Wrestling 4th place

== Mixed martial arts record ==
Professional record breakdown
31 matches	20 wins	11 losses
By knockout	1	4
By submission	14	3
By decision	5	4

Res.	Record	Opponent	Method	Event	Date	Round	Time	Location	Notes
Win	20–11	Theo Kolehmainen	Submission (anaconda choke)	Ice Cage Fighting 5	September 6, 2025	1	0:47	Turku, Finland	Won the Ice Cage Lightweight Championship.
Win	19–11	Joni Salovaara	Decision (unanimous)	Ice Cage Fighting 4	May 3, 2025	3	5:00	Helsinki, Finland	
Win	18–11	Fernando Flores	Submission (anaconda choke)	Ice Cage Fighting 3	December 28, 2024	3	3:52	Vantaa, Finland	Catchweight (150 lb) bout.
Loss	17–11	Attila Korkmaz	Submission (rear-naked choke)	Oktagon 58	8 June 2024	3	3:37	Prague, Czech Republic	Oktagon Lightweight Tournament Reserve bout.
Loss	17–10	Mochamed Machaev	KO (punches)	Oktagon 54	2 March 2024	3	0:06	Ostrava, Czech Republic	Lightweight debut. Oktagon Lightweight Tournament Round of 16.
Loss	17–9	Jack Shore	Submission (rear-naked choke)	UFC 286	18 March 2023	2	4:27	London, England	
Loss	17–8	Jonathan Pearce	TKO (punches)	UFC Fight Night: Blaydes vs. Aspinall	23 July 2022	2	4:10	London, England	
Win	17–7	Mike Grundy	Technical Submission (anaconda choke)	UFC Fight Night: Volkov vs. Aspinall	19 March 2022	1	0:57	London, England	Performance of the Night.
Loss	16–7	Lerone Murphy	KO (knee)	UFC 267	30 October 2021	2	0:14	Abu Dhabi, United Arab Emirates	
Loss	16–6	Kamuela Kirk	Decision (unanimous)	UFC Fight Night: Rozenstruik vs. Sakai	5 June 2021	3	5:00	Las Vegas, Nevada, United States	
Loss	16–5	Edson Barboza	Decision (unanimous)	UFC Fight Night: Moraes vs. Sandhagen	10 October 2020	3	5:00	Abu Dhabi, United Arab Emirates	
Win	16–4	Danny Henry	Technical Submission (anaconda choke)	UFC 251	12 July 2020	1	3:15	Abu Dhabi, United Arab Emirates	
Loss	15–4	Shane Burgos	TKO (punches)	UFC 244	2 November 2019	3	4:32	New York City, New York, United States	
Win	15–3	Chris Fishgold	Submission (anaconda choke)	UFC Fight Night: Gustafsson vs. Smith	1 June 2019	2	4:25	Stockholm, Sweden	Performance of the Night.
Win	14–3	Jason Knight	Decision (split)	UFC Fight Night: Thompson vs. Till	27 May 2018	3	5:00	Liverpool, England	
Loss	13–3	Arnold Allen	Decision (split)	UFC Fight Night: Manuwa vs. Anderson	18 March 2017	3	5:00	London, England	
Win	13–2	Mike Wilkinson	Decision (unanimous)	UFC Fight Night: Silva vs. Bisping	27 February 2016	3	5:00	London, England	
Win	12–2	Masio Fullen	Submission (rear-naked choke)	UFC Fight Night: Jędrzejczyk vs. Penne	20 June 2015	1	1:41	Berlin, Germany	
Win	11–2	Andy Ogle	TKO (flying knee and punches)	UFC on Fox: Gustafsson vs. Johnson	24 January 2015	1	0:08	Stockholm, Sweden	Performance of the Night.
Win	10–2	Yohan Guerin	Decision (unanimous)	Cage 26	5 April 2014	3	5:00	Turku, Finland	Catchweight (150 lb) bout.
Loss	9–2	Adam Ward	Decision (unanimous)	Cage 24: Turku 3	9 November 2013	3	5:00	Turku, Finland	
Win	9–1	Nayeb Hezam	Submission (anaconda choke)	Fight for Glory: First Round	6 April 2013	1	3:58	Turku, Finland	Return to Featherweight.
Win	8–1	Tom Duquesnoy	Technical Submission (anaconda choke)	Cage 21: Turku 2	2 February 2013	1	1:50	Turku, Finland	Bantamweight debut.
Win	7–1	Semen Tyrlya	Submission (modified rear-naked choke)	StandUpWar 3: Rising Stars	27 October 2012	1	3:03	Tampere, Finland	
Win	6–1	Johannes Isaksson	Submission (leg lock)	Botnia Punishment 12	14 September 2012	1	1:50	Seinäjoki, Finland	
Win	5–1	Kari Päivinen	Submission (guillotine choke)	Lappeenranta Fight Night 7	14 April 2012	1	2:23	Lappeenranta, Finland	
Win	4–1	Aleksejs Povulans	Decision (unanimous)	Cage 18: Turku	3 March 2012	2	5:00	Turku, Finland	
Win	3–1	Lauri Väätäinen	Submission (heel hook)	Cage 16: 1st Defense	8 October 2011	1	0:50	Espoo, Finland	
Loss	2–1	Viktor Tomasevic	Submission (triangle choke)	Karkkila Fight Night 1	18 June 2011	1	2:45	Karkkila, Finland	
Win	2–0	Markus Rytöhonka	Submission (triangle choke)	TF: Turku Sport & Extreme Expo	9 April 2011	1	N/A	Turku, Finland	
Win	1–0	Tadas Aleksonis	Submission (rear-naked choke)	TF 2: Champions Are Here	23 October 2010	1	1:21	Turku, Finland	

== Amateur boxing record ==
No.	Result	Record	Opponent	Method	Round, time	Date	Location	Notes
5	Loss	3–2	(Finland) Santeri Laine	MD	3	January 19, 2019	(Finland) Nääshalli, Tampere, Pirkanmaa	
4	Win	3–1	(Finland) Jamil Mahdi	SD	3	November 24, 2018	(Finland) Punaportin liikuntahalli, Hämeenlinna, Kanta-Häme	
3	Win	2–1	(Finland) Eetu Sankari	MD	3	November 11, 2018	(Finland) Nääshalli, Tampere, Pirkanmaa	
2	Win	1–1	(Finland) Ari Nevalainen	MD	3	October 27, 2018	(Finland) Nokian palloiluhalli, Nokia, Pirkanmaa	
1	Loss	0–1	(Finland) Mico Hakkarainen	MD	3	October 13, 2018	(Finland) Urheilutalo Feeniks, Forssa, Kanta-Häme	

== See also ==
- List of male mixed martial artists
