= Zelim Imadaev =

Russian mixed martial arts fighter

- Born: January 25, 1995 (age 31); Grozny, Russia
- Nationality: Russian
- Height: 6 ft 0 in (1.83 m)
- Weight: 170 lb (77 kg; 12 st 2 lb)
- Division: Welterweight
- Reach: 76.0 in (193 cm)
- Fighting out of: Chechnya, Russia
- Years active: 2016–present

Professional boxing record
- Total: 1
- Wins: 0
- By knockout: 0
- Losses: 1

Mixed martial arts record
- Total: 11
- Wins: 8
- By knockout: 8
- Losses: 3
- By knockout: 1
- By submission: 1
- By decision: 1

Other information
- Boxing record from BoxRec
- Mixed martial arts record from Sherdog

Zelim Imadaev (born January 25, 1995) is a Russian mixed martial artist who competed in the Welterweight division of the Ultimate Fighting Championship.

== Background ==
Imadaev began training in combat sports when he was 14 years old. His first foray was into kickboxing for one year, before pursuing boxing. With boxing, he held an amateur record of 59–1. He was also involved in numerous street fights, which prompted his brother to recommend Imadaev to start training mixed martial arts.

== Mixed martial arts career ==
=== Early career ===
Before entering the UFC, Zelim fought in Russian MMA promotions, most notably Fight Nights Global, where he compiled an undefeated 8–0, all won by technical knockout or knockout.

=== Ultimate Fighting Championship ===
Imadaev faced Max Griffin in his UFC debut on April 13, 2019, at UFC 236. He lost the fight via majority decision. Imadaev was deducted a point in the first round for grabbing the fence.

Zelim faced Danny Roberts on 9 November at UFC on ESPN+ 21. He lost the fight via knockout in round two.

Imadaev faced Michel Pereira on September 5, 2020, at UFC Fight Night: Overeem vs. Sakai. During the weigh-in ceremony, Imadaev slapped the Brazilian and both fighters were restrained by the event's security. In the fight, Pereira was dominant throughout and repeatedly slapped Imadaev. Imadaev ultimately was taken down in the third round and lost the fight via submission due to a rear-naked choke.

In October 2020, Imadaev praised a Chechen teen responsible for the decapitation of French schoolteacher Samuel Paty, describing the murderer as a "hero of Islam" on social media. The UFC stated in response that Imadaev had already been "released from his contract earlier this summer and is no longer a member of the promotion’s roster".

== Mixed martial arts record ==
Professional record breakdown
11 matches	8 wins	3 losses
By knockout	8	1
By submission	0	1
By decision	0	1

Res.	Record	Opponent	Method	Event	Date	Round	Time	Location	Notes
Loss	8–3	Michel Pereira	Submission (rear-naked choke)	UFC Fight Night: Overeem vs. Sakai	September 5, 2020	3	4:39	Las Vegas, Nevada, United States	
Loss	8–2	Danny Roberts	KO (punch)	UFC Fight Night: Magomedsharipov vs. Kattar	November 9, 2019	2	4:54	Moscow, Russia	
Loss	8–1	Max Griffin	Decision (majority)	UFC 236	April 13, 2019	3	5:00	Atlanta, Georgia, United States	
Win	8–0	Ivan Gluhak	KO (punch)	Fight Nights Global 85	March 30, 2018	1	0:13	Moscow, Russia	
Win	7–0	Yuri Izotov	KO (spinning back elbow)	Fight Nights Global 74	September 29, 2017	1	3:17	Moscow, Russia	
Win	6–0	Kenan Guliev	TKO (punches)	Fight Nights Global 66	May 21, 2017	1	1:34	Makhachkala, Russia	
Win	5–0	Chorshanbe Chorshanbiev	TKO (punches)	OFS 11	March 4, 2017	3	1:50	Moscow, Russia	
Win	4–0	Dmitriy Tuzov	TKO (punch)	OFS 10: Heroes Return	December 10, 2016	2	0:11	Yaroslavl, Russia	
Win	3–0	Kamardin Akhmadbekov	TKO (punch)	OFS 9: Battle in Abkhazia	October 6, 2016	1	1:03	Sukhumi, Georgia	
Win	2–0	Alexander Kovalenko	TKO (punches)	GEFC: Hammer of Thor 3	August 12, 2016	2	3:58	Shcholkine, Ukraine	
Win	1–0	Stanislav Pavlenko	KO (punches)	Dagestan Cage Fighting Championship 2016	April 2, 2016	1	0:12	Kaspiysk, Russia	

== Professional boxing record ==
1 fight	0 wins	1 loss
By decision	0	1

No.	Result	Record	Opponent	Type	Round, time	Date	Location	Notes
1	Loss	0–1	(Ukraine) Ihor Makoiedov	UD	4	March 1, 2014	Spartak Gym, Kyiv, Ukraine	

== See also ==
- List of male mixed martial artists
