= Arnold Allen =

British mixed martial artist (born 1994)

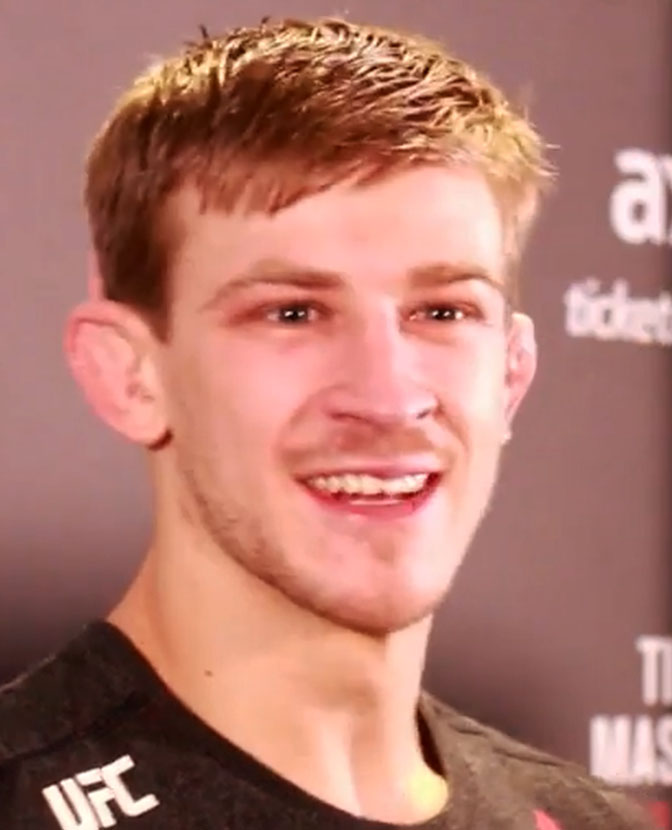
- Arnold Allen at UFC Fight Night 147 in London
- Born: Arnold Billy Allen; 22 January 1994 (age 32); Ipswich, Suffolk, England
- Other names: Almighty
- Height: 5 ft 9 in (1.75 m)
- Weight: 145 lb (66 kg; 10 st 5 lb)
- Division: Bantamweight (2012–2013); Featherweight (2013–present); Lightweight (2014)
- Reach: 70 in (178 cm)
- Fighting out of: Trimley St Martin, Suffolk, England
- Team: BKK Fighters, UK; Tristar Gym
- Rank: Black belt in Brazilian Jiu-Jitsu under Mark Nixon

Kickboxing record
- Total: 3
- Wins: 3
- Losses: 0

Mixed martial arts record
- Total: 25
- Wins: 21
- By knockout: 7
- By submission: 4
- By decision: 10
- Losses: 4
- By decision: 4

Amateur mixed martial arts record
- Total: 7
- Wins: 7
- By knockout: 1
- By submission: 4
- By decision: 2
- Losses: 0

Other information
- Mixed martial arts record from Sherdog

Arnold Billy Allen (born 22 January 1994) is a British professional mixed martial artist. He currently competes in the Featherweight division of the Ultimate Fighting Championship (UFC). As of 12 September 2026, he is #6 in the Meta UFC featherweight rankings.

== Background ==
Born and raised in Suffolk, Allen began training in mixed martial arts as a teenager and took part in several amateur fights before turning professional in 2012.

== Mixed martial arts career ==
=== Early career ===
He made his professional debut competing as a featherweight for various regional promotions across Great Britain, including a stint in Cage Warriors. He was able to compile a record of 9–1 in his first three years along the way.

After his TKO stoppage of Paul Cook in November 2014, Allen signed with the UFC.

=== Ultimate Fighting Championship ===
Allen made his promotional debut on 20 June 2015 as a short notice replacement filling in for an injured Mike Wilkinson against Alan Omer at UFC Fight Night 69. After probably dropping the first two rounds, Allen won the fight via submission in the third round. He was also awarded a Performance of the Night bonus.

Allen next faced Yaotzin Meza on 27 February 2016 at UFC Fight Night 84. He won the fight by unanimous decision.

Allen was expected to face Mirsad Bektic on 8 October 2016 at UFC 204. However, due to injury, Allen withdrew from the fight and was replaced by Russell Doane.

Allen faced Makwan Amirkhani on 18 March 2017 at UFC Fight Night 107. He won the fight by split decision.

Allen was scheduled to face Enrique Barzola at UFC 220 on 20 January 2018. However, Allen was pulled from the fight on 11 January due to alleged visa issues which restricted his ability to travel. Following this announcement, It was determined that Allen would be replaced by Matt Bessette at UFC 220.

Allen faced Mads Burnell on 27 May 2018 at UFC Fight Night 130. He won the fight via front choke submission in the third round. This win earned him the Performance of the Night award.

Allen was expected to face Gilbert Melendez on 30 November 2018 at The Ultimate Fighter 28 Finale. However, Melendez pulled out of the fight on 5 November and was replaced by Ricky Glenn. In turn, Allen pulled out of the fight on 16 November citing a cut he received while training.

Allen faced Jordan Rinaldi on 16 March 2019 at UFC Fight Night 147. He won the fight by unanimous decision.

Allen faced Gilbert Melendez on 6 July 2019 at UFC 239. He won the fight via unanimous decision.

Allen was expected to face Josh Emmett on 25 January 2020 at UFC Fight Night 166. However Emmett was pulled from the event for an undisclosed reason, and he was replaced by Nik Lentz whose original featherweight opponent also dropped out of the event. Allen won the fight via unanimous decision. Lentz would later claim he lost 40% of his vision after being poked in the eye by Allen.

Allen was scheduled to face Jeremy Stephens on 7 November 2020 at UFC on ESPN 17. However, Stephens was forced to withdraw from the event, citing injury. In turn, the bout was cancelled.

Allen faced Sodiq Yusuff on 10 April 2021 at UFC on ABC 2. After knocking Yusuff down twice, he won the fight via unanimous decision.

Allen faced Dan Hooker at UFC Fight Night 204. He won the fight via technical knockout in the first round. With this win, he received the Performance of the Night award.

Allen faced Calvin Kattar on 29 October 2022 at UFC Fight Night 213, winning via technical knockout following a knee injury to Kattar.

Allen faced former UFC Featherweight champion Max Holloway on 15 April 2023 at UFC on ESPN 44, where he lost via unanimous decision, ending his win streak in the UFC.

Allen faced Movsar Evloev on 20 January 2024, at UFC 297. In a competitive bout, he lost by unanimous decision.

Allen faced Giga Chikadze on 27 July 2024, at UFC 304. He won the fight by unanimous decision.

Allen faced Jean Silva on 24 January 2026, at UFC 324. He lost the fight via unanimous decision.

Allen faced Melquizael Costa on 16 May 2026 in the main event at UFC Fight Night 276. He won the fight by unanimous decision.

Allen was scheduled to face Aaron Pico on 24 October 2026 at UFC 333. However, Allen withdrew due to an injury and was replaced by Losene Keita.

== Personal life ==
Allen was issued a five-month suspended sentence after he pleaded guilty to affray, for his role in a 23 December 2016 brawl near Ipswich which left a man and five women injured.

His brother, Jake, participates in Strongman and was European Champion in the 90 kg weight class in 2024.

== Championships and accomplishments ==
- Ultimate Fighting Championship
  - Performance of the Night (Three times) vs. Alan Omer, Mads Burnell and Dan Hooker
  - Third longest win streak in UFC Featherweight division history (10)
  - Sixth most wins in UFC Featherweight division history (12)
  - Tied (Cub Swanson) for sixth most decision wins in UFC Featherweight division history (8)
- Made4TheCage
  - M4TC Lightweight Championship (One time; former)

== Mixed martial arts record ==
Professional record breakdown
25 matches	21 wins	4 losses
By knockout	7	0
By submission	4	0
By decision	10	4

Res.	Record	Opponent	Method	Event	Date	Round	Time	Location	Notes
Win	21–4	Melquizael Costa	Decision (unanimous)	UFC Fight Night: Allen vs. Costa	16 May 2026	5	5:00	Las Vegas, Nevada, United States	
Loss	20–4	Jean Silva	Decision (unanimous)	UFC 324	24 January 2026	3	5:00	Las Vegas, Nevada, United States	
Win	20–3	Giga Chikadze	Decision (unanimous)	UFC 304	27 July 2024	3	5:00	Manchester, England	
Loss	19–3	Movsar Evloev	Decision (unanimous)	UFC 297	20 January 2024	3	5:00	Toronto, Ontario, Canada	
Loss	19–2	Max Holloway	Decision (unanimous)	UFC on ESPN: Holloway vs. Allen	15 April 2023	5	5:00	Kansas City, Missouri, United States	
Win	19–1	Calvin Kattar	TKO (knee injury)	UFC Fight Night: Kattar vs. Allen	29 October 2022	2	0:08	Las Vegas, Nevada, United States	
Win	18–1	Dan Hooker	TKO (punches and elbows)	UFC Fight Night: Volkov vs. Aspinall	19 March 2022	1	2:33	London, England	Performance of the Night.
Win	17–1	Sodiq Yusuff	Decision (unanimous)	UFC on ABC: Vettori vs. Holland	10 April 2021	3	5:00	Las Vegas, Nevada, United States	
Win	16–1	Nik Lentz	Decision (unanimous)	UFC Fight Night: Blaydes vs. dos Santos	25 January 2020	3	5:00	Raleigh, North Carolina, United States	
Win	15–1	Gilbert Melendez	Decision (unanimous)	UFC 239	6 July 2019	3	5:00	Las Vegas, Nevada, United States	
Win	14–1	Jordan Rinaldi	Decision (unanimous)	UFC Fight Night: Till vs. Masvidal	16 March 2019	3	5:00	London, England	
Win	13–1	Mads Burnell	Submission (guillotine choke)	UFC Fight Night: Thompson vs. Till	27 May 2018	3	2:41	Liverpool, England	Performance of the Night.
Win	12–1	Makwan Amirkhani	Decision (split)	UFC Fight Night: Manuwa vs. Anderson	18 March 2017	3	5:00	London, England	
Win	11–1	Yaotzin Meza	Decision (unanimous)	UFC Fight Night: Silva vs. Bisping	27 February 2016	3	5:00	London, England	
Win	10–1	Alan Omer	Submission (guillotine choke)	UFC Fight Night: Jędrzejczyk vs. Penne	20 June 2015	3	1:41	Berlin, Germany	Return to Featherweight. Performance of the Night.
Win	9–1	Paul Cook	TKO (doctor stoppage)	Made 4 the Cage 15	29 November 2014	2	5:00	Tyne and Wear, England	Lightweight debut. Won the M4TC Lightweight Championship.
Win	8–1	Gaetano Pirello	Decision (unanimous)	Cage Warriors 71	22 August 2014	3	5:00	Amman, Jordan	
Loss	7–1	Marcin Wrzosek	Decision (unanimous)	Cage Warriors 69	7 June 2014	3	5:00	London, England	
Win	7–0	Tobias Huber	TKO (punches)	Cage Warriors: Fight Night 11	18 April 2014	1	0:37	Amman, Jordan	
Win	6–0	Doni Miller	TKO (punches)	Cage Warriors 61	13 December 2013	2	0:34	Amman, Jordan	
Win	5–0	Declan Williams	Submission (triangle choke)	Cage Warriors 60	5 October 2013	2	4:50	London, England	
Win	4–0	Andy Green	Submission (rear-naked choke)	Cage Warriors 56	6 July 2013	1	4:00	London, England	
Win	3–0	Carl Orriss	Decision (unanimous)	Ultimate Challenge MMA 32	2 February 2013	3	5:00	London, England	Featherweight debut.
Win	2–0	Kim Thinghaugen	TKO (doctor stoppage)	Ultimate Warrior Challenge 21	20 October 2012	1	5:00	Southend-on-Sea, England	
Win	1–0	Nathan Greyson	KO (punch)	Ultimate Challenge MMA 27	7 April 2012	2	0:40	London, England	Bantamweight debut.
