= Aaron Phillips (fighter) =

American mixed martial arts fighter

- Born: Aaron Ern-Wuei Phillips; August 5, 1989 (age 37); Houston, Texas, United States
- Height: 5 ft 9 in (1.75 m)
- Weight: 135 lb (61 kg; 9 st 9 lb)
- Division: Bantamweight
- Reach: 69 in (175 cm)
- Fighting out of: Lafayette, Louisiana
- Team: Headkicks MMA; Gladiators Academy
- Rank: Fourth degree black belt in Taekwondo
- Years active: 2011–present

Mixed martial arts record
- Total: 18
- Wins: 12
- By knockout: 6
- By submission: 2
- By decision: 4
- Losses: 6
- By knockout: 2
- By submission: 1
- By decision: 3

Other information
- University: University of Louisiana
- Mixed martial arts record from Sherdog

Aaron Ern-Wuei Phillips (born August 5, 1989) is an American mixed martial artist who competes in the Bantamweight division. A professional since 2011, he is most notable for his time in the Ultimate Fighting Championship.

== Background ==
His mom came over from Penang, Malaysia to the US for university and met his father. She was a school teacher, so every summer he would go back to Malaysia from the age of four to eleven.

== Mixed martial arts career ==
=== Early career ===
Phillips started fighting MMA professionally in 2011, mainly for regional Louisiana organizations, compiling a 7–0 record, before signing with the UFC in 2014.

=== Ultimate Fighting Championship ===
Philips made his UFC debut as an injury replacement for Doo Ho Choi against Sam Sicilia on May 24, 2014 at UFC 173. However, Choi pulled out of the bout citing an injury. He lost the fight via unanimous decision.

Aaron Phillips faced Matt Hobar at UFC Fight Night: Henderson vs. dos Anjos on August 23, 2014. He lost the fight via unanimous decision.

After his second loss in a row, Phillips was released from the UFC.

=== World Fighting Championships and Other Organizations ===
After his release from the UFC, Phillips faced future UFC fighter Chris Gutiérrez for the vacant WFC Bantamweight Championship. Due to the bay doors not being able to be closed, the fight took place in 30 °F (−1 °C) cold. Due to an injury picked up during the fight, he was unable to continue, therefore losing the fight.

After this fight, due to injuries, he did not fight for 3 years before coming back in 2018 and picking up 4 straight wins in the World Fighting Championships organization. With a one off fight in VFL which he won by TKO, he was signed once again to the UFC.

=== Second stint in the UFC ===
With Anderson dos Santos testing positive for COVID-19 before his fight with Jack Shore at bantamweight, Phillips was chosen as his replacement for the July 16, 2020 fight at UFC on ESPN: Kattar vs. Ige He lost the fight in the second round via rear-naked choke.

Philips was scheduled to face Adrian Yanez on October 31, 2020 at UFC Fight Night 181. However on October 20, Phillips pulled out due to an undisclosed injury.

Phillips was scheduled to face Cameron Else on July 17, 2021 at UFC on ESPN 26. However in mid-July, Else pulled out to undisclosed reasons. Aaron was expected to face Trevin Jones on July 24, 2021 at UFC on ESPN: Sandhagen vs. Dillashaw. On July 18, Phillips pulled out off the bout.

Phillips was scheduled to face Kris Moutinho on October 23, 2021 at UFC Fight Night 196. However, Moutinho was removed from the event for undisclosed reasons and was replaced by Jonathan Martinez. In turn, Philips withdrew from the bout due to illness.

Phillips faced Gastón Bolaños on April 15, 2023 at UFC on ESPN 44. He lost the fight by unanimous decision.

On June 8, it was announced that Phillips was not extended a new contract and no longer on the UFC roster.

== Mixed martial arts record ==
Professional record breakdown
18 matches	12 wins	6 losses
By knockout	6	2
By submission	2	1
By decision	4	3

Res.	Record	Opponent	Method	Event	Date	Round	Time	Location	Notes
Loss	12–6	Robert Casper	KO (punches)	Ragin FC 2	June 14, 2025	1	1:04	Lafayette, Louisiana, United States	For the inaugural Ragin FC Bantamweight Championship.
Loss	12–5	Gastón Bolaños	Decision (unanimous)	UFC on ESPN: Holloway vs. Allen	April 15, 2023	3	5:00	Kansas City, Missouri, United States	
Loss	12–4	Jack Shore	Submission (rear-naked choke)	UFC on ESPN: Kattar vs. Ige	July 16, 2020	2	2:29	Abu Dhabi, United Arab Emirates	
Win	12–3	Ariston França	TKO (punches)	Goat Promotions: Cajuns vs. Cowboys	November 7, 2019	1	1:16	Dallas, Texas, United States	Featherweight bout.
Win	11–3	Devante Sewell	Decision (unanimous)	WFC 101	March 21, 2019	3	5:00	Charenton, Louisiana, United States	
Win	10–3	Anthony Retic	Submission (rear-naked choke)	WFC 97	November 10, 2018	1	1:49	Charenton, Louisiana, United States	
Win	9–3	Jeremy Rogers	TKO (punches)	WFC 86	May 12, 2018	1	2:50	Charenton, Louisiana, United States	
Win	8–3	Andy Brossett	TKO	WFC 82	January 27, 2018	1	4:43	Charenton, Louisiana, United States	
Loss	7–3	Chris Gutiérrez	TKO (retirement)	WFC 35	February 28, 2015	3	5:00	Baton Rouge, Louisiana, United States	For the vacant WFC Bantamweight Championship.
Loss	7–2	Matt Hobar	Decision (unanimous)	UFC Fight Night: Henderson vs. dos Anjos	August 23, 2014	3	5:00	Tulsa, Oklahoma, United States	Return to Bantamweight.
Loss	7–1	Sam Sicilia	Decision (unanimous)	UFC 173	May 24, 2014	3	5:00	Las Vegas, Nevada, United States	
Win	7–0	Tyler Shinn	Decision (split)	C3 Fights: Border Wars 2014	February 8, 2014	3	5:00	Newkirk, Oklahoma, United States	
Win	6–0	D.J. Fuentes	Decision (unanimous)	USA MMA 23	December 21, 2013	3	5:00	Lafayette, Louisiana, United States	
Win	5–0	Joe Yeampierre	Submission (rear-naked choke)	WFC 12	October 11, 2013	1	1:52	Baton Rouge, Louisiana, United States	Return to Featherweight.
Win	4–0	Micah Goss	TKO (punches)	USA MMA 22	August 17, 2013	1	4:32	Lafayette, Louisiana, United States	
Win	3–0	Ryan Hollis	Decision (unanimous)	USA MMA 20	February 16, 2013	3	5:00	Lafayette, Louisiana, United States	Bantamweight debut.
Win	2–0	John de Jesus	Decision (unanimous)	Global Fighting Alliance 17	February 11, 2012	3	5:00	Youngsville, Louisiana, United States	
Win	1–0	Heriberto Acuna	KO (punches)	Global Fighting Alliance: SugArena Rage	April 2, 2011	1	1:26	Baton Rouge, Louisiana, United States	Featherweight debut.

== See also ==
- List of male mixed martial artists
