= UFC Fight Night: Henderson vs. dos Anjos =

UFC mixed martial arts event in 2014

- The poster for UFC Fight Night: Henderson vs. dos Anjos
- Promotion: Ultimate Fighting Championship
- Date: August 23, 2014
- Venue: BOK Center
- City: Tulsa, Oklahoma
- Attendance: 7,119
- Total gate: $452,075

Event chronology
UFC Fight Night: Bisping vs. Le	UFC Fight Night: Henderson vs. dos Anjos	UFC 177: Dillashaw vs. Soto

UFC Fight Night: Henderson vs. dos Anjos (also known as UFC Fight Night 49) was a mixed martial arts event held on August 23, 2014, at the BOK Center in Tulsa, Oklahoma.

== Background ==
The event was headlined by Lightweight contenders Benson Henderson and Rafael dos Anjos.

The event is the second visit to Tulsa, Oklahoma, the first being UFC 4, nearly 20 years ago.

Jordan Mein was expected to face Thiago Alves at the event. However, Alves pulled out of the bout with an injury and was replaced by Brandon Thatch. Subsequently, Thatch also pulled out of the bout with Mein citing a toe injury. In turn, Mein faced Mike Pyle at the event, as Pyle's scheduled opponent Demian Maia, also pulled out of their bout with a staph infection.

As a result of the cancellation of UFC 176, bouts between Beneil Dariush vs. Anthony Rocco Martin, James Vick vs. Valmir Lazaro and Matt Dwyer vs. Alex Garcia were rescheduled for this event. However, Dwyer was removed from his bout with Garcia and replaced by Neil Magny.

Ernest Chavez was expected to face Mirsad Bektic at the event. However, Chavez was forced out of the bout with an injury and was replaced by Max Holloway. In turn, Bektic pulled out of the bout in the week leading up to the event and was replaced by promotional newcomer Clay Collard.

Tim Elliott was expected to face Wilson Reis at the event. However, Elliott pulled out of the bout in the days leading up to the event. Reis faced promotional newcomer Joby Sanchez.

== Results ==
Main Card (Fox Sports 1)
Weight class				Method	Round	Time	Notes
Lightweight	Rafael dos Anjos	def.	Benson Henderson	KO (punch)	1	2:31
Welterweight	Jordan Mein	def.	Mike Pyle	TKO (punches)	1	1:12
Middleweight	Thales Leites	def.	Francis Carmont	KO (punches)	2	0:20
Catchweight (149 lbs)	Max Holloway	def.	Clay Collard	TKO (punches)	3	3:47
Lightweight	James Vick	def.	Valmir Lazaro	Decision (unanimous) (29–28, 30–27, 29–28)	3	5:00
Featherweight	Chas Skelly	def.	Tom Niinimäki	Submission (rear-naked choke)	1	2:35
Preliminary card (Fox Sports 2)
Welterweight	Neil Magny	def.	Alex Garcia	Decision (unanimous) (29–28, 30–27, 30–27)	3	5:00
Lightweight	Beneil Dariush	def.	Anthony Rocco Martin	Submission (arm-triangle choke)	2	3:38
Bantamweight	Matt Hobar	def.	Aaron Phillips	Decision (unanimous) (29–28, 29–28, 29–28)	3	5:00
Welterweight	Ben Saunders	def.	Chris Heatherly	Submission (omoplata)	1	2:18
Preliminary card (UFC Fight Pass)
Flyweight	Wilson Reis	def.	Joby Sanchez	Decision (unanimous) (29–28, 29–28, 29–28)	3	5:00

== Bonus awards ==
The following fighters received $50,000 bonuses:

- Fight of the Night: None awarded
- Performance of the Night: Rafael dos Anjos, Jordan Mein, Thales Leites, and Ben Saunders

== Reported payout ==
The following is the reported payout to the fighters as reported to the Oklahoma State Athletic Commission. It does not include sponsor money or "locker room" bonuses often given by the UFC and also do not include the UFC's traditional "fight night" bonuses.

- Rafael dos Anjos: $76,000 ($38,000 win bonus) def. Benson Henderson: $48,000
- Jordan Mein: $40,000 ($20,000 win bonus) def. Mike Pyle: $51,000
- Thales Leites: $40,000 ($20,000 win bonus) def. Francis Carmont: $30,000
- Max Holloway: $40,000 ($20,000 win bonus) def. Clay Collard: $8,000
- James Vick: $16,000 ($8,000 win bonus) def. Valmir Lazaro: $8,000
- Chas Skelly: $16,000 ($8,000 win bonus) def. Tom Niinimäki: $10,000
- Neil Magny: $24,000 ($12,000 win bonus) def. Alex Garcia: $12,000
- Beneil Dariush: $20,000 ($10,000 win bonus) def. Tony Martin: $8,000
- Matt Hobar: $16,000 ($8,000 win bonus) def. Aaron Phillips: $8,000
- Ben Saunders: $24,000 ($12,000 win bonus) def. Chris Heatherly: $8,000
- Wilson Reis: $20,000 ($10,000 win bonus) def. Joby Sanchez: $8,000

== See also ==
- List of UFC events
- 2014 in UFC
