= Danny Roberts (fighter) =

English mixed martial arts fighter

- Born: 14 July 1987 (age 39); Croydon, London, England
- Other names: Hot Chocolate
- Height: 6 ft 1 in (1.85 m)
- Weight: 170 lb (77 kg; 12 st 2 lb)
- Division: Welterweight
- Reach: 74 in (188 cm)
- Style: Boxing
- Stance: Southpaw
- Fighting out of: Liverpool, England, U.K.
- Team: Team McHale
- Years active: 2010–present

Professional boxing record
- Total: 4
- Wins: 3
- By knockout: 1
- Losses: 1

Mixed martial arts record
- Total: 27
- Wins: 18
- By knockout: 8
- By submission: 5
- By decision: 5
- Losses: 9
- By knockout: 6
- By submission: 2
- By decision: 1

Other information
- Boxing record from BoxRec
- Mixed martial arts record from Sherdog

Danny Roberts (born 14 July 1987) is an English mixed martial artist who competed in the Welterweight division of the Ultimate Fighting Championship. A professional since 2010, he has also competed for Cage Warriors.

== Background ==
Born in Croydon, London, Roberts grew up on a deprived estate with his mum and ten siblings before moving to Hartcliffe, Bristol at age 9. Unfortunately, things were only marginally better and Roberts who grew up without his father around and began to find himself drifting down the wrong path with the wrong people. After being expelled from seven different schools in London and Bristol, Roberts moved to Birkenhead following his dreams where Roberts began boxing at age 16. He compiled a 3–1 pro record, before making his debut in mixed martial arts in 2010.

== Mixed martial arts career ==
=== Early career ===
After going 1–1 as an amateur, he made his professional debut in December 2010. He competed for several regional promotions across Great Britain, including a stint in Cage Warriors. He was able to compile a record of 11 - 1 before signing with the UFC on the heels of a first round finish of Jim Wallhead in September 2015.

=== Ultimate Fighting Championship ===
Roberts was expected to make his promotional debut against Michael Graves on 10 December 2015 at UFC Fight Night 80. However, Graves was forced out of the bout with an injury and replaced by Nathan Coy. Roberts won the fight via technical submission in the first round.

Roberts next faced Dominique Steele on 23 April 2016 at UFC 197. He won the back-and-forth fight via unanimous decision. Both participants were awarded a Fight of the Night bonus.

Roberts faced Mike Perry on 8 October 2016 at UFC 204. He lost the back and forth fight via knockout in the third round.

Roberts faced Bobby Nash on 16 July 2017 at UFC Fight Night 113. He won the fight via knockout in the second round.

Roberts was expected to face Sheldon Westcott on 16 December 2017 at UFC on Fox 26. However, Westcott was removed from the card for undisclosed reasons in early December and was replaced by Nordine Taleb. Roberts lost the fight via knockout in the first round.

Roberts faced Oliver Enkamp on 17 March 2018 at UFC Fight Night 127. He won the fight via knockout in the first round.

Roberts was expected to face Alan Jouban on 22 July 2018 at UFC Fight Night 134. However, on 12 July, Jouban was pulled out from the fight, citing a neck injury. Jouban was replaced David Zawada. He won the fight via split decision. This win earned him the Fight of the Night award.

Roberts faced Cláudio Silva on 16 March 2019 at UFC Fight Night 147. He lost the bout via an armbar submission in the third round.

Roberts faced promotional newcomer Michel Pereira on 18 May 2019 at UFC Fight Night 152. He lost the fight via knockout in the first round.

Roberts faced Zelim Imadaev on 9 November at UFC on ESPN+ 21. He won the fight via knockout in round two.

Roberts was scheduled to face Nicolas Dalby on 21 March 2020 at UFC Fight Night: Woodley vs. Edwards. Due to the COVID-19 pandemic, the event was eventually postponed . The bout with Dalby was rescheduled and was expected to take place on 25 July 2020 at UFC Fight Night: Whittaker vs. Till. However, Roberts was injured and he was replaced by Jesse Ronson.

Roberts was scheduled to face Tim Means on 19 June 2021 at UFC on ESPN 25 However, the pairing was scrapped by the promotion in the days leading up to the event for undisclosed reasons.

Roberts faced Ramazan Emeev on 16 October 2021 at UFC Fight Night 195. Roberts won the fight via controversial split decision. 10 out of 12 media outlets scored the bout as a win for Emeev.

Roberts faced Francisco Trinaldo on 7 May 2022 at UFC 274. He lost the bout via unanimous decision.

Roberts faced Jack Della Maddalena on 19 November 2022, at UFC Fight Night 215. He lost the fight via technical knockout in round one.

Roberts faced Jonny Parsons on 22 July 2023 at UFC on ESPN+ 82. He lost the fight via TKO in the second round. Despite the loss, he received his third Fight of the Night bonus award.

On 7 January 2025, it was reported that Roberts was removed from the UFC roster.

=== Global Fight League ===
Roberts was scheduled to face Neiman Gracie in the inaugural Global Fight League event on May 24, 2025 at GFL 1. However, all GFL events were cancelled indefinitely.

=== Professional Fighters League ===
Roberts made his PFL debut against Patrick Habirora on July 5, 2025, at PFL Europe 2. He lost the fight via a head kick knockout in round one.

== Championships and accomplishments ==
- Ultimate Fighting Championship
  - Fight of the Night (Three times) vs. Dominique Steele, David Zawada, and Jonny Parsons

== Mixed martial arts record ==
Professional record breakdown
27 matches	18 wins	9 losses
By knockout	8	6
By submission	5	2
By decision	5	1

Res.	Record	Opponent	Method	Event	Date	Round	Time	Location	Notes
Loss	18–9	Patrick Habirora	KO (head kick)	PFL Europe 2 (2025)	July 5, 2025	1	4:32	Brussels, Belgium	
Loss	18–8	Jonny Parsons	TKO (punches)	UFC Fight Night: Aspinall vs. Tybura	22 July 2023	2	4:57	London, England	Fight of the Night.
Loss	18–7	Jack Della Maddalena	TKO (punches)	UFC Fight Night: Nzechukwu vs. Cuțelaba	19 November 2022	1	3:24	Las Vegas, Nevada, United States	
Loss	18–6	Francisco Trinaldo	Decision (unanimous)	UFC 274	7 May 2022	3	5:00	Phoenix, Arizona, United States	
Win	18–5	Ramazan Emeev	Decision (split)	UFC Fight Night: Ladd vs. Dumont	16 October 2021	3	5:00	Las Vegas, Nevada, United States	
Win	17–5	Zelim Imadaev	KO (punch)	UFC Fight Night: Magomedsharipov vs. Kattar	9 November 2019	2	4:54	Moscow, Russia	
Loss	16–5	Michel Pereira	KO (flying knee and punch)	UFC Fight Night: dos Anjos vs. Lee	18 May 2019	1	1:47	Rochester, New York, United States	
Loss	16–4	Cláudio Silva	Submission (armbar)	UFC Fight Night: Till vs. Masvidal	16 March 2019	3	3:37	London, England	
Win	16–3	David Zawada	Decision (split)	UFC Fight Night: Shogun vs. Smith	22 July 2018	3	5:00	Hamburg, Germany	Fight of the Night.
Win	15–3	Oliver Enkamp	KO (punch)	UFC Fight Night: Werdum vs. Volkov	17 March 2018	1	2:12	London, England	
Loss	14–3	Nordine Taleb	KO (head kick and punch)	UFC on Fox: Lawler vs. dos Anjos	16 December 2017	1	0:59	Winnipeg, Manitoba, Canada	
Win	14–2	Bobby Nash	KO (punches)	UFC Fight Night: Nelson vs. Ponzinibbio	16 July 2017	2	3:59	Glasgow, Scotland	
Loss	13–2	Mike Perry	KO (knee and punches)	UFC 204	8 October 2016	3	4:40	Manchester, England	
Win	13–1	Dominique Steele	Decision (unanimous)	UFC 197	23 April 2016	3	5:00	Las Vegas, Nevada, United States	Fight of the Night.
Win	12–1	Nathan Coy	Technical Submission (triangle choke)	UFC Fight Night: Namajunas vs. VanZant	10 December 2015	1	2:46	Las Vegas, Nevada, United States	
Win	11–1	Jim Wallhead	KO (punches)	Cage Warriors 68	3 May 2014	1	4:49	Liverpool, England	
Win	10–1	Juan Manuel Suarez	Decision (unanimous)	Cage Warriors 64	15 February 2014	3	5:00	London, England	
Win	9–1	Henry Fadipe	Submission (rear-naked choke)	Cage Warriors 57	20 July 2013	3	3:34	Liverpool, England	Catchweight (180 lb) bout.
Win	8–1	Diego Gonzalez	TKO (knee and punches)	Cage Warriors 54	4 May 2013	2	3:02	Cardiff, Wales	
Win	7–1	Jack Mason	Submission (armbar)	Cage Warriors 48	21 July 2012	2	2:46	London, England	
Loss	6–1	Pavel Doroftei	Submission (heel hook)	UCC 10	16 December 2011	1	1:21	Manchester, England	
Win	6–0	Shaun Lomas	Decision (unanimous)	UCC 10	16 December 2011	2	5:00	Manchester, England	
Win	5–0	Shaun Lomas	Submission (rear-naked choke)	Cage Conflict 11	29 October 2011	1	3:32	Liverpool, England	
Win	4–0	Aurelijus Kerpe	Submission (brabo choke)	Raw Promotions 1	11 September 2011	2	2:43	Liverpool, England	
Win	3–0	David Howell	TKO (knee to the body)	Cage Warriors 43	9 July 2011	2	2:26	London, England	
Win	2–0	Matt Ross Francombe	KO (knee to the body and punches)	OMMAC 9	5 March 2011	2	1:27	Liverpool, England	
Win	1–0	Darius Kuncevicius	TKO (knees)	OMMAC 8	4 December 2010	1	0:47	Liverpool, England	

== See also ==
- List of male mixed martial artists
