= UFC Fight Night: Magomedsharipov vs. Kattar =

UFC mixed martial arts event in 2019

- The poster for UFC Fight Night: Magomedsharipov vs. Kattar
- Promotion: Ultimate Fighting Championship
- Date: November 9, 2019
- Venue: CSKA Arena
- City: Moscow, Russia
- Attendance: 11,305

Event chronology
UFC 244: Masvidal vs. Diaz	UFC Fight Night: Magomedsharipov vs. Kattar	UFC Fight Night: Błachowicz vs. Jacaré

UFC Fight Night: Magomedsharipov vs. Kattar (also known as UFC Fight Night: Zabit vs. Kattar, UFC Fight Night 163 and UFC on ESPN+ 21) was a mixed martial arts event produced by the Ultimate Fighting Championship that took place on November 9, 2019 at CSKA Arena in Moscow, Russia.

== Background ==
A heavyweight bout between former UFC Heavyweight Champion Junior dos Santos and former Bellator Heavyweight Champion Alexander Volkov was scheduled to serve as the event headliner. However, dos Santos pulled out of the matchup on October 22, citing a bacterial infection in his leg. Greg Hardy was announced as the replacement on the same day, moving this bout down into the co-main event slot.

A featherweight bout between Zabit Magomedsharipov and Calvin Kattar was scheduled for UFC on ESPN: Reyes vs. Weidman. However, promotion officials then elected to instead reschedule the pairing for this event. In turn, after a change up in participants in the original main event, the pairing was elevated to serve as a three round headliner.

Vinc Pichel was linked to a bout with Alexander Yakovlev at the event. However, Pichel pulled out of the fight on October 24, citing an undisclosed injury and was replaced by Roosevelt Roberts.

A light heavyweight bout between Gadzhimurad Antigulov and Ed Herman was scheduled for the event. However, Antigulov was pulled from the bout for an undisclosed reason and replaced by Khadis Ibragimov.

== Results ==
Main Card (ESPN+)
Weight class				Method	Round	Time	Notes
Featherweight	Zabit Magomedsharipov	def.	Calvin Kattar	Decision (unanimous) (29–28, 29–28, 29–28)	3	5:00
Heavyweight	Alexander Volkov	def.	Greg Hardy	Decision (unanimous) (30–27, 30–27, 30–27)	3	5:00
Welterweight	Danny Roberts	def.	Zelim Imadaev	KO (punch)	2	4:54
Light Heavyweight	Ed Herman	def.	Khadis Ibragimov	Decision (unanimous) (30–27, 30–27, 29–28)	3	5:00
Welterweight	Anthony Rocco Martin	def.	Ramazan Emeev	Decision (unanimous) (30–27, 29–28, 29–28)	3	5:00
Light Heavyweight	Shamil Gamzatov	def.	Klidson Abreu	Decision (split) (28–29, 29–28, 29–28)	3	5:00
Preliminary Card (ESPN+)
Light Heavyweight	Magomed Ankalaev	def.	Dalcha Lungiambula	KO (front kick and punch)	3	0:29
Welterweight	Rustam Khabilov	def.	Sergey Khandozhko	Decision (unanimous) (30–27, 29–28, 29–28)	3	5:00
Middleweight	Karl Roberson	def.	Roman Kopylov	Submission (rear-naked choke)	3	4:01	(Note: Kopylov was deducted a point in round 3 due to an accidental eye poke.)
Welterweight	David Zawada	def.	Abubakar Nurmagomedov	Submission (triangle choke)	1	2:50
Lightweight	Roosevelt Roberts	def.	Alexander Yakovlev	Decision (unanimous) (29–28, 29–28, 29–28)	3	5:00
Women's Bantamweight	Pannie Kianzad	def.	Jessica-Rose Clark	Decision (unanimous) (30–27, 30–27, 30–27)	3	5:00
Bantamweight	Davey Grant	def.	Grigory Popov	Decision (split) (29–28, 28–29, 29–28)	3	5:00

== Bonus awards ==
The following fighters received $50,000 bonuses.

- Fight of the Night: Zabit Magomedsharipov vs. Calvin Kattar
- Performance of the Night: Magomed Ankalaev and David Zawada

== See also ==
- List of UFC events
- 2019 in UFC
- List of current UFC fighters
