= UFC on ESPN: Kattar vs. Ige =

UFC mixed martial arts event in 2020

- The poster for UFC on ESPN: Kattar vs. Ige
- Promotion: Ultimate Fighting Championship
- Date: July 16, 2020
- Venue: du Forum
- City: Abu Dhabi, United Arab Emirates
- Attendance: None (behind closed doors)

Event chronology
UFC 251: Usman vs. Masvidal	UFC on ESPN: Kattar vs. Ige	UFC Fight Night: Figueiredo vs. Benavidez 2

UFC on ESPN: Kattar vs. Ige (also known as UFC on ESPN 13 and UFC Fight Island 1) was a mixed martial arts event produced by the Ultimate Fighting Championship that took place on July 16, 2020 at the du Forum on Yas Island, Abu Dhabi, United Arab Emirates.

== Background ==
This event was the second of four UFC Fight Island events scheduled to take place on Yas Island in July 2020, following UFC 251, as part of a plan to facilitate the hosting of events involving fighters impacted by U.S. travel restrictions related to the COVID-19 pandemic.

Without fans in attendance, the promotion didn't have to worry about the local timing of the event, so it proceeded with normal timing for prime time hours on the east coast of North America. The main card began at 6:00 am (July 16) local time in Abu Dhabi, and a full preliminary card began at approximately 3:00 am Gulf Standard Time.

A featherweight bout between Calvin Kattar and Dan Ige served as the event headliner.

A middleweight bout between John Phillips and Duško Todorović was expected to take place at UFC Fight Night: Woodley vs. Edwards. However, the event was the first of five to be cancelled due to the COVID-19 pandemic and the bout was moved to Cage Warriors 113 (as the English organization's president decided to help some of the scheduled bouts to happen in his promotion's event scheduled for March 20). In turn, Todorović pulled out due to other travel restrictions in the region. They were then expected to meet at this event. On July 8, Todorović pulled out once again, this time due to a potential medical issue. He was replaced by promotional newcomer Khamzat Chimaev.

A bantamweight bout between Pedro Munhoz and former UFC Lightweight Champion Frankie Edgar was briefly linked to UFC 251, four days earlier. However, promotion officials elected to schedule the pairing for this event. On July 6, it was announced that the bout between Munhoz and Edgar was scrapped due to Munhoz testing positive for COVID-19. They were rescheduled for UFC 252.

A light heavyweight bout between Vinicius Moreira and Modestas Bukauskas was scheduled for the event, along with another bout between Anderson dos Santos and Jack Shore at bantamweight. However, Moreira and dos Santos both tested positive for COVID-19 on July 3 and were removed from the event. They were replaced by Andreas Michailidis and Aaron Phillips respectively.

A women's strawweight bout between former Invicta FC and UFC Women's Strawweight Champion Carla Esparza and Marina Rodriguez was scheduled for the event. However, a Rodriguez cornerman tested positive for COVID-19 and the bout was cancelled. Rodriguez had her test come back negative, but the bout was scrapped due to precautionary reasons. They were rescheduled for UFC on ESPN: Whittaker vs. Till on July 26.

A light heavyweight bout between Timo Feucht and Kenneth Bergh was scheduled for the event. However, one day after the bout was announced, Feucht was removed from the event for unknown reasons and was replaced by Jorge Gonzalez. It was later announced that Feucht was removed due to past Neo-Nazi ties, including a January 2016 attack in the Connewitz district of Leipzig for which he was arrested. In turn, the bout was cancelled on the day of the weigh-ins as Bergh had issues during his weight cut.

At the weigh-ins, Abdul Razak Alhassan and Chris Fishgold missed weight for their respective bouts. Alhassan weighed in at 174 pounds, three pounds over the welterweight non-title fight limit. Fishgold weighed in at 149 pounds, three pounds over the featherweight non-title fight limit. Both their bouts proceeded at a catchweight and they were respectively fined 20% of their individual purses, which went to their opponents Mounir Lazzez and Jared Gordon.

== Results ==
Main card (ESPN / ESPN+)
Weight class				Method	Round	Time	Notes
Featherweight	Calvin Kattar	def.	Dan Ige	Decision (unanimous) (49–46, 49–46, 48–47)	5	5:00
Flyweight	Tim Elliott	def.	Ryan Benoit	Decision (unanimous) (29–28, 29–28, 29–28)	3	5:00
Featherweight	Jimmie Rivera	def.	Cody Stamann	Decision (unanimous) (30–27, 30–27, 29–28)	3	5:00
Women's Flyweight	Taila Santos	def.	Molly McCann	Decision (unanimous) (30–27, 30–27, 30–26)	3	5:00
Catchweight (174 lb)	Mounir Lazzez	def.	Abdul Razak Alhassan	Decision (unanimous) (30–27, 30–27, 29–28)	3	5:00
Preliminary Card (ESPN / ESPN+)
Middleweight	Khamzat Chimaev	def.	John Phillips	Submission (D'Arce choke)	2	1:12
Featherweight	Lerone Murphy	def.	Ricardo Ramos	TKO (punches)	1	4:18
Light Heavyweight	Modestas Bukauskas	def.	Andreas Michailidis	TKO (elbows)	1	5:00
Catchweight (149 lb)	Jared Gordon	def.	Chris Fishgold	Decision (unanimous) (30–26, 30–26, 30–26)	3	5:00
Women's Flyweight	Liana Jojua	def.	Diana Belbiţă	Submission (armbar)	1	2:47
Bantamweight	Jack Shore	def.	Aaron Phillips	Submission (rear-naked choke)	2	2:29

== Bonus awards ==
The following fighters received $50,000 bonuses.

- Fight of the Night: Mounir Lazzez vs. Abdul Razak Alhassan^{1}
- Performance of the Night: Khamzat Chimaev, Lerone Murphy and Modestas Bukauskas

1. Abdul Razak Alhassan was disqualified for the Fight of the Night bonus due to missing weight, as a result a third Performance of the Night bonus was awarded.

== See also ==
- List of UFC events
- List of current UFC fighters
- 2020 in UFC
