= Tristan Connelly =

Canadian mixed martial artist

- Born: Tristan Connelly; December 12, 1985 (age 40); Victoria, British Columbia, Canada
- Other names: Boondock
- Nationality: Canadian
- Height: 5 ft 11 in (1.80 m)
- Weight: 145 lb (66 kg; 10 st 5 lb)
- Division: Featherweight (2011, 2015, 2021–present); Lightweight (2010–2011, 2012–2019); Welterweight (2019); Middleweight (2013)
- Reach: 68 in (173 cm)
- Stance: Orthodox
- Fighting out of: Vancouver, British Columbia, Canada
- Team: Checkmat Vancouver
- Rank: Black belt in Brazilian Jiu-Jitsu
- Years active: 2010–present

Mixed martial arts record
- Total: 23
- Wins: 14
- By knockout: 4
- By submission: 9
- By decision: 1
- Losses: 9
- By knockout: 1
- By submission: 1
- By decision: 7

Other information
- Mixed martial arts record from Sherdog

Tristan Connelly (born December 12, 1985) is a Canadian mixed martial arts fighter who formerly competed in the featherweight division of the UFC and had previously won the Cage Sports Lightweight Championship, Unified MMA Lightweight Championship, as well as the Rise FC Lightweight Championship.

== Background ==
Born and raised in Victoria, British Columbia, Connelly began competing in mixed martial arts in 2010. He holds a black belt in Brazilian jiu-jitsu under Adam Ryan. Connelly runs a gym, called Pinnacle Combat Academy, in suburban Richmond.

Connelly spent much of his childhood skateboarding and playing hockey, which he credits with preparing him to take hard hits. After taking a BJJ class, Connelly fell in love with the sport and the wider world of mixed martial arts.

== Mixed martial arts career ==
=== Early career ===
Connelly competed in smaller promotions, earning himself a record of 13–6. During that span, he managed to capture lightweight championships in three different promotions: Rise FC, CageSport, Unified MMA.

=== Ultimate Fighting Championship ===
Replacing Sergey Khandozhko on 5 days notice, Connelly made his promotional debut on September 14, 2019, against Michel Pereira at UFC Fight Night 158. At the weigh-ins, Pereira missed weight by a pound and forfeited 20 percent of his purse to Connelly. Despite a flashy start from Pereira he quickly gassed allowing Connelly to dominate the remainder of the fight and winning via unanimous decision. The bout was awarded a Fight of the Night bonus, but due to Pereira's weight miss, his bonus was forfeited to Connelly.

Connelly was scheduled to make his sophomore appearance in the organization against Alex da Silva Coelho on April 11, 2020, at UFC Fight Night: Overeem vs. Harris. However, the event was initially rescheduled and eventually cancelled due to the COVID-19 pandemic and the bout was scrapped.

Connelly spent the next year on the sidelines recovering from a disc injury in his neck that he acquired in a car crash in 2019 before his UFC debut.

In his sophomore appearance in the UFC, Connelly faced Pat Sabatini at UFC 261 on April 24, 2021. He lost the fight via unanimous decision after being knocked down early in the fight.

Connelly was then scheduled to face Makwan Amirkhani on October 30, 2021 at UFC 267. However, Connelly withdrew in early September due to a neck injury and was replaced by Lerone Murphy.

Connelly faced Darren Elkins on April 30, 2022 at UFC on ESPN: Font vs. Vera. He lost the bout via unanimous decision.

On June 9, 2022 it was announced that Connelly was released from the UFC.

=== Post UFC ===
Connelly faced Xavier Nash on October 12, 2022 at BFL 74. He lost the bout via unanimous decision.

== Championships and accomplishments ==
- Ultimate Fighting Championship
  - Fight of the Night (One Time) vs. Michel Pereira
  - UFC.com Awards
    - 2019: Ranked #2 Upset of the Year vs. Michel Pereira
- Rise Fighting Championship
  - Rise FC Lightweight Championship (one time; former)
- CageSport MMA
  - CS Lightweight Championship (one time; former)
    - One successful title defense
- Unified MMA
  - Unified MMA Lightweight Championship (one time; former)
- MMAjunkie.com
  - 2019 Upset of the Year vs. Michel Pereira
- Sherdog
  - 2019 Upset of the Year vs. Michel Pereira

== Mixed martial arts record ==
Professional record breakdown
23 matches	14 wins	9 losses
By knockout	4	1
By submission	9	1
By decision	1	7

Res.	Record	Opponent	Method	Event	Date	Round	Time	Location	Notes
Loss	14–9	Xavier Nash	Decision (unanimous)	BFL 74	October 12, 2022	3	5:00	Vancouver, Canada	Return to Lightweight.
Loss	14–8	Darren Elkins	Decision (unanimous)	UFC on ESPN: Font vs. Vera	April 30, 2022	3	5:00	Las Vegas, Nevada, United States	
Loss	14–7	Pat Sabatini	Decision (unanimous)	UFC 261	April 24, 2021	3	5:00	Jacksonville, Florida, United States	Return to Featherweight.
Win	14–6	Michel Pereira	Decision (unanimous)	UFC Fight Night: Cowboy vs. Gaethje	September 14, 2019	3	5:00	Vancouver, British Columbia, Canada	Welterweight bout; Pereira missed weight (172 lb). Fight of the Night.
Win	13–6	D'Juan Owens	TKO (punches)	Rise FC 4	July 27, 2019	5	1:56	Victoria, British Columbia, Canada	Won the Rise FC Lightweight Championship.
Win	12–6	Zach Juusola	Submission (guillotine)	Final Fight Championship 36	May 9, 2019	1	2:46	Las Vegas, Nevada, United States	Catchweight (160 lb) bout.
Win	11–6	Tyrone Henderson	TKO (retirement)	CageSport 54	December 15, 2018	1	5:00	Tacoma, Washington, United States	Defended the CS Lightweight Championship.
Win	10–6	Joey Pierotti	Submission (armbar)	CageSport 50	April 28, 2018	4	1:06	Tacoma, Washington, United States	Won the CS Lightweight Championship.
Loss	9–6	Shane Campbell	Submission (kneebar)	Unified MMA 31	June 9, 2017	3	4:54	Edmonton, Alberta, Canada	Lost the Unified MMA Lightweight Championship.
Win	9–5	Lenny Wheeler	Submission (rear naked choke)	Elite 1 MMA	May 6, 2017	3	3:47	Fredericton, New Brunswick, Canada	
Win	8–5	Garret Nybakken	Submission (rear naked choke)	Unified MMA 30	March 31, 2017	3	2:47	Edmonton, Alberta, Canada	Won the Unified MMA Lightweight Championship.
Win	7–5	Adam Assenza	Submission (rear naked choke)	Fight Night 2	November 28, 2016	2	1:11	Medicine Hat, Alberta, Canada	
Win	6–5	Ash Mashreghi	TKO (punches)	BFL 45 Ascension	September 17, 2016	1	1:24	Coquitlam, British Columbia, Canada	
Loss	5–5	Mario Pereira	Decision (unanimous)	BFL 39: Halloween Hell	October 17, 2015	3	5:00	Coquitlam, British Columbia, Canada	Featherweight bout.
Win	5–4	Shawn Albrecht	TKO (punches)	BFL 37: Gladiator	July 25, 2015	1	4:21	Coquitlam, British Columbia, Canada	Return to Lightweight.
Win	4–4	Jonathan Dubois	Submission (rear naked choke)	AFC 18: Mayhem	May 19, 2013	1	2:48	Victoria, British Columbia, Canada	Middleweight debut.
Loss	3–4	Myles Merola	Decision (unanimous)	AFC 13: Natural Selection	November 3, 2012	3	5:00	Victoria, British Columbia, Canada	
Win	3–3	Corey Houston	Submission (rear naked choke)	AFC 11: Takeover	September 15, 2012	1	4:47	Winnipeg, Manitoba, Canada	Return to Lightweight.
Loss	2–3	Matt Trudeau	TKO (shoulder injury)	Armageddon FC 7	November 19, 2011	1	5:00	Colwood, British Columbia, Canada	Featherweight bout.
Win	2–2	Upneet Rai	Submission (rear naked choke)	Armageddon FC 6	June 18, 2011	1	2:30	Colwood, British Columbia, Canada	Catchweight (150 lb) bout.
Loss	1–2	Dan Ring	Decision (unanimous)	Armageddon FC 4	November 6, 2010	3	5:00	Halifax, Nova Scotia, Canada	Lightweight bout.
Loss	1–1	Takahiro Kajita	Decision (unanimous)	Deep: Cage Impact in Nagoya	July 11, 2010	2	5:00	Nagoya, Japan	
Win	1-0	Jimmy Phan	Submission (rear naked choke)	Armageddon FC	March 6, 2010	1	2:26	Colwood, British Columbia, Canada	

== See also ==
- List of Canadian UFC fighters
