= Jack Shore =

Welsh mixed martial arts fighter

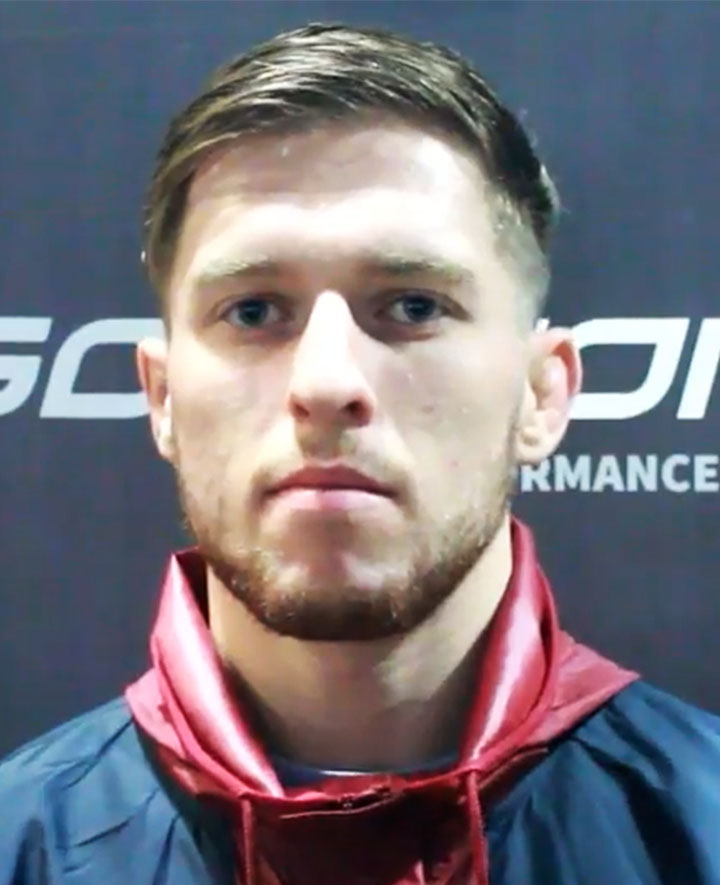
- Jack Shore at Cage Warriors 100
- Born: 6 February 1995 (age 31); Abertillery, Wales
- Other names: Tank
- Height: 5 ft 9 in (1.75 m)
- Weight: 145 lb (65 kg)
- Division: Featherweight (2016–2018, 2023–2024); Bantamweight (2018–2022)
- Reach: 71 in (180 cm)
- Fighting out of: Abertillery, Wales
- Team: Tillery Combat MMA Academy (until 2019); Shore Mixed Martial Arts
- Trainer: Richard Shore
- Rank: Black belt in Brazilian Jiu Jitsu under Richard Shore
- Years active: 2016–2024

Mixed martial arts record
- Total: 20
- Wins: 17
- By knockout: 4
- By submission: 9
- By decision: 4
- Losses: 3
- By knockout: 1
- By submission: 2

Other information
- Mixed martial arts record from Sherdog

Jack Shore (born 6 February 1995) is a Welsh former professional mixed martial artist who previously competed in the Featherweight division of the Ultimate Fighting Championship (UFC). A professional competitor from 2016 to 2024, he is the former Bantamweight champion in the Cage Warriors promotion.

== Background ==
Shore started kickboxing at six years old, at the behest of his father. After doing that for four years, his father opened an MMA gym in 2007 and Shore has been training as a MMA fighter ever since.

== Mixed martial arts career ==
=== Early career ===
Shore had an undefeated amateur tenure (12-0) concluded with a gold medal and four impressive triumphs in the men's lightweight division of the inaugural 2015 IMMAF European Open.

=== Cage Warriors ===
Shore made his debut as a featherweight against Tyler Thomas at Pain Pit Fight Night 15: Renegade on 5 March 2016, and won by a first-round submission. Three months later, he was scheduled to make his Cage Warriors debut against David Tonatiuh Crol at CWFC 76 on 4 June 2016. Shore made use of his superior grappling to take Crol down and submit him with a first-round rear-naked choke. Shore was next scheduled to face Eddie Pobivanez at CWFC 79 on 15 October 2016. Shore won the fight by a second-round technical knockout.

For his third fight with the promotion, Shore moved away from the Cage Warriors flagship events. He was scheduled to fight the undefeated Alexandros Gerolimatos at Cage Warriors FC: Academy Wales on 4 March 2017. Shore needed a little over two minutes to submit Gerolimatos with a rear-naked choke.

Shore made his fourth appearance with Cage Warriors at CWFC 83 on 6 May 2017, against Konmon Deh. Shore won the fight by a first-round armbar submission. Shore then faced Mattia Galbiati at CWFC 87 on 14 October 2017. He won the fight by a third-round knockout. Shore was scheduled to face Ayton De Paepe at CWFC 89 on 25 November 2017. It was Shore's last appearance as a featherweight with Cage Warriors. Shore won the fight by a first-round submission.

Shore moved down in weight to bantamweight for his seventh appearance with Cage Warriors. He was scheduled to fight Vaughan Lee at CWFC 92: Super Saturday on 24 March 2018. Shore won the fight by unanimous decision. Shore extended his winning streak to nine fights with a first-round technical knockout of Weslley Maia at CWFC 97 on 29 September 2018.

==== Cage Warriors Bantamweight champion ====
His nine-fight winning streak earned Shore the chance to challenge the reigning bantamweight champion Mike Ekundayo at CWFC 100 on 8 December 2018. Shore dominated his fellow undefeated prospect through takedowns and ground-and-pound, en route to a third-round technical knockout victory.

Shore was scheduled to make his first title defense against Scott Malone at CWFC 104 on 27 April 2019. Shore won the fight by a third-round rear-naked choke submission.

On 29 May 2019, it was announced that Shore had signed with the UFC.

=== Ultimate Fighting Championship ===
Shore made his promotional debut against Nohelin Hernandez at UFC Fight Night: Hermansson vs. Cannonier on 28 September 2019. He won the fight via third-round submission. The win earned him a Performance of the Night bonus.

He was then expected to make his sophomore appearance in the organization against Geraldo de Freitas at UFC Fight Night: Woodley vs. Edwards on 21 March 2020. However, the whole event was cancelled due to the COVID-19 pandemic.

He was scheduled to face Anderson dos Santos at UFC on ESPN: Kattar vs. Ige on 16 July 2020. However, dos Santos tested positive for COVID-19 before departing Brazil and was replaced by Aaron Phillips. He won the fight in the second round via rear-naked choke.

Next he was scheduled to face Khalid Taha on 7 November 2020 at UFC on ESPN: Santos vs. Teixeira. However, Shore was removed from the bout in late-October due to undisclosed reason and replaced by Raoni Barcelos.

Shore faced Hunter Azure at UFC on ABC: Vettori vs. Holland on 10 April 2021. He won the bout via split decision. 16 out of 16 media members scored the fight for Shore.

Shore was scheduled to face Said Nurmagomedov on 4 September 2021 at UFC Fight Night 191 However, Nurmagomedov was pulled from the event due to visa issues, and he was replaced by Zviad Lazishvili. In turn, Lazishvili pulled out from the bout due to injury and was replaced by Liudvik Sholinian. Shore won the fight via unanimous decision.

Shore was scheduled to face Umar Nurmagomedov on 19 March 2022, at UFC Fight Night 204. However, Nurmagomedov was removed from the bout for unknown reason and he was replaced by Timur Valiev. Shore won the fight via unanimous decision.

Shore faced Ricky Simón on 16 July 2022 at UFC on ABC 3. He lost the bout via arm-triangle choke in the second round.

Shore was scheduled to face Kyler Phillips on 19 November 2022 at UFC Fight Night 215. However, Shore suffered "a serious knee injury" and was not expected to return to competition before the end of 2022.

Shore faced Makwan Amirkhani in his featherweight debut on 18 March 2023 at UFC 286. He won the fight via a rear-naked choke submission in the second round.

Shore faced Joanderson Brito on 3 May 2024, at UFC 301. Shore lost the fight by technical knockout as a result of a doctor stoppage after a kick caused a leg wound.

Shore faced Youssef Zalal on 2 November 2024 at UFC Fight Night 246. He lost the fight via an arm-triangle choke in round two.

=== Retirement ===
On 11 December 2024, Shore announced his retirement from his professional MMA career. Shore was 29 years old at the time of his retirement. In an Instagram post, Shore stated that he had opted not to re-sign with the UFC to protect his well-being after his injuries in the sport over time.

For the entirety of my 20’s fighting and training was my life and sole focus, however the last few weeks/months have showed this is no longer the case. And I always promised myself when I was mentality checked out I would retire from the sport rather than the sport retire me. Injures have caught up with me after a lifetime in the sport. I’m leaving with my mental in check, good health, financially stable and am fully ready to move onto the future.

== Championships and accomplishments ==
=== Mixed martial arts ===
- Ultimate Fighting Championship
  - Performance of the Night (one time) vs. Nohelin Hernandez
- Cage Warriors
  - CWFC Bantamweight Championship (one time; former)
    - One successful title defense
- LowKick MMA
  - 2021 Prospect of the Year

== Mixed martial arts record ==
Professional record breakdown
| 20 matches | 17 wins | 3 losses |
| By knockout | 4 | 1 |
| By submission | 9 | 2 |
| By decision | 4 | 0 |

| Res. | Record | Opponent | Method | Event | Date | Round | Time | Location | Notes |
|---|---|---|---|---|---|---|---|---|---|
| Loss | 17–3 | Youssef Zalal | Submission (arm-triangle choke) | UFC Fight Night: Moreno vs. Albazi | November 2, 2024 | 2 | 0:59 | Edmonton, Alberta, Canada | |
| Loss | 17–2 | Joanderson Brito | TKO (doctor stoppage) | UFC 301 | May 4, 2024 | 2 | 3:35 | Rio de Janeiro, Brazil | |
| Win | 17–1 | Makwan Amirkhani | Submission (rear-naked choke) | UFC 286 | March 18, 2023 | 2 | 4:27 | London, England | Return to Featherweight. |
| Loss | 16–1 | Ricky Simón | Submission (arm-triangle choke) | UFC on ABC: Ortega vs. Rodríguez | July 16, 2022 | 2 | 3:28 | Elmont, New York, United States | |
| Win | 16–0 | Timur Valiev | Decision (unanimous) | UFC Fight Night: Volkov vs. Aspinall | March 19, 2022 | 3 | 5:00 | London, England | |
| Win | 15–0 | Liudvik Sholinian | Decision (unanimous) | UFC Fight Night: Brunson vs. Till | September 4, 2021 | 3 | 5:00 | Las Vegas, Nevada, United States | |
| Win | 14–0 | Hunter Azure | Decision (split) | UFC on ABC: Vettori vs. Holland | April 10, 2021 | 3 | 5:00 | Las Vegas, Nevada, United States | |
| Win | 13–0 | Aaron Phillips | Submission (rear-naked choke) | UFC on ESPN: Kattar vs. Ige | July 16, 2020 | 2 | 2:29 | Abu Dhabi, United Arab Emirates | |
| Win | 12–0 | Nohelin Hernandez | Submission (rear-naked choke) | UFC Fight Night: Hermansson vs. Cannonier | September 28, 2019 | 3 | 2:51 | Copenhagen, Denmark | Performance of the Night. |
| Win | 11–0 | Scott Malone | Submission (rear-naked choke) | Cage Warriors 104 | April 27, 2019 | 3 | 2:28 | Cardiff, Wales | Defended the Cage Warriors Bantamweight Championship. |
| Win | 10–0 | Mike Ekundayo | TKO (punches) | Cage Warriors 100 | December 8, 2018 | 3 | 4:07 | Cardiff, Wales | Won the vacant Cage Warriors Bantamweight Championship. |
| Win | 9–0 | Weslley Maia | TKO (elbows and punches) | Cage Warriors 97 | September 29, 2018 | 1 | 2:51 | Cardiff, Wales | |
| Win | 8–0 | Vaughan Lee | Decision (unanimous) | Cage Warriors 92 | March 24, 2018 | 3 | 5:00 | London, England | Bantamweight debut. |
| Win | 7–0 | Ayton De Paepe | Submission (rear-naked choke) | Cage Warriors 89 | November 25, 2017 | 1 | 3:04 | Antwerp, Belgium | |
| Win | 6–0 | Mattia Galbiati | KO (knee) | Cage Warriors 87 | October 14, 2017 | 3 | 4:14 | Newport, Wales | |
| Win | 5–0 | Konmon Deh | Submission (armbar) | Cage Warriors 83 | May 6, 2017 | 1 | 4:46 | Newport, Wales | |
| Win | 4–0 | Alexandros Gerolimatos | Submission (rear-naked choke) | Cage Warriors: Academy Wales 1 | March 4, 2017 | 1 | 2:03 | Newport, Wales | |
| Win | 3–0 | Eddie Pobivanez | TKO (punches) | Cage Warriors 79 | October 15, 2016 | 2 | 2:11 | Newport, Wales | |
| Win | 2–0 | David Tonatiuh Crol | Submission (rear-naked choke) | Cage Warriors 76 | June 4, 2016 | 1 | 3:36 | Newport, Wales | |
| Win | 1–0 | Tyler Thomas | Submission (rear-naked choke) | Pain Pit Fight Night 15: Renegade | March 5, 2016 | 1 | 1:48 | Ebbw Vale, Wales | Featherweight debut. |

== See also ==
- List of male mixed martial artists
