= Giga Chikadze =

Georgian mixed martial artist (born 1988)

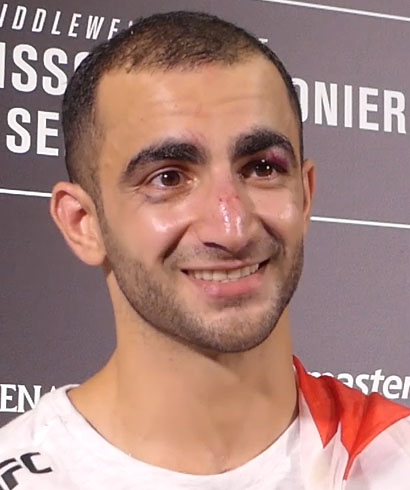
- Chikadze in 2019
- Born: 25 August 1988 (age 38); Tbilisi, Georgian SSR, Soviet Union
- Nickname: Ninja
- Height: 6 ft 0 in (1.83 m)
- Weight: 145 lb (66 kg; 10.4 st)
- Division: Featherweight (kickboxing); Featherweight (MMA)
- Reach: 74 in (188 cm)
- Style: Kickboxing
- Fighting out of: Tbilisi, Georgia
- Team: Kings MMA
- Rank: 3rd dan black belt in Goju-ryu Karate

Kickboxing record
- Total: 50
- Wins: 38
- By knockout: 22
- Losses: 12
- By knockout: 4

Mixed martial arts record
- Total: 22
- Wins: 15
- By knockout: 9
- By submission: 1
- By decision: 5
- Losses: 7
- By knockout: 2
- By submission: 1
- By decision: 4

Other information
- Mixed martial arts record from Sherdog

Giga Chikadze (Georgian: გიგა ჭიკაძე; born 25 August 1988) is a Georgian professional mixed martial artist and former kickboxer. He competed in the Featherweight division of the Ultimate Fighting Championship (UFC) and Glory Kickboxing.

== Background ==
Giga Chikadze was born on 25 August 1988 in Tbilisi. Between ages 4 and 5, he began to train in Gōjū-ryū Karate. As a child, he inspired to join after watching martial arts movies by Jet Li and Bruce Lee. His first introduction to MMA was watching the early UFC events (specifically UFC 1) on VHS tapes, he was very impressed with Royce Gracie with his capabilities of defeating opponents of larger size while wearing a keikogi.

Chikadze started competing in kickboxing, moving to the Netherlands for training and in 2015 he joined GLORY, the world's largest kickboxing organization.

== Mixed martial arts career ==
=== World Series of Fighting ===
Chikadze made his mixed martial arts debut as a lightweight in the WSOF, facing Xtreme Couture fighter Gil Guardado. He lost the fight by unanimous decision.

=== Gladiator Challenge ===
Chikadze would join a promotion known as the Gladiator Challenge, and would enjoy a five-fight win streak in which all fights were ended via first-round knockout.

=== Dana White's Tuesday Night Contender Series ===
In mid-June, Chikadze would join UFC president Dana White's Dana White's Contender Series 10 in Las Vegas, Nevada to face former Ultimate Fighter contestant Austin Springer in a featherweight bout. Chikadze would receive his second professional loss in his MMA career after submitting to a rear-naked choke in the third round.

=== Return to the Gladiator Challenge ===
After losing to Springer, Chikadze would return to the lightweight division of the Gladiator Challenge, earning a quick submission victory and a swift TKO after that.

=== Ultimate Fighting Championship ===
Chikadze would sign a four-fight contract with the UFC and would be scheduled to make his UFC debut against fellow Contender Series fighter Mike Davis at UFC Fight Night 160 in Copenhagen, Denmark. However, Davis would pull out of the fight due to health issues and would be replaced by Brandon Davis in a short-notice bout. After three rounds passed, the fight would be declared a split draw, but due to a scoring error made by one of the judges of the bout, the outcome would be corrected to a split decision victory for Chikadze.

Chikadze would make his next UFC appearance on the preliminary card of UFC 248 against featherweight Jamall Emmers. Chikadze would earn a razor-thin split decision victory over Emmers after the bout had ended.

Chikadze, once again, would be scheduled to face Mike Davis on 16 May 2020 at UFC on ESPN 8. However, Davis would pull out of the bout due to a weight cut-related illness and would be replaced by promotional newcomer Irwin Rivera. Chikadze would win the fight by unanimous decision.

Chikadze was scheduled to face Alex Caceres on 29 August 2020 at UFC Fight Night 175. However, Chikadze withdrew from the bout due to tested positive for COVID-19 and he was replaced by promotional newcomer Kevin Croom.

Chikadze faced Omar Morales on 11 October 2020 at UFC Fight Night 179. He won the fight via unanimous decision despite knocking Morales down in the final round.

Chikadze faced promotional newcomer Jamey Simmons on 7 November 2020 at UFC on ESPN 17. He won the fight via technical knockout in round one. This win earned him the Performance of the Night award.

Chikadze faced Cub Swanson on 1 May 2021 at UFC on ESPN 23. He won the bout in the first round via technical knockout after catching Swanson with a kick to the liver. This win earned him the Performance of the Night bonus award.

Chikadze faced Edson Barboza on 28 August 2021 at UFC on ESPN 30. He won the back-and-forth fight via technical knockout in round three. This win earned him the Performance of the Night award.

Chikadze faced Calvin Kattar in the main event on 15 January 2022 at UFC on ESPN 32. He lost the fight via unanimous decision after being knocked down and almost finished in the final seconds of the fight. This fight earned him the Fight of the Night award.

On 22 May 2022, it was announced that Chikadze would receive the UFC 2022 Recipient of Forrest Griffin Community Award for his exceptional volunteer and charity work for his non-profit "Knockout Cancer Foundation" that assists individuals fighting cancer with financial support for medical bills.

Chikadze was scheduled to face Sodiq Yusuff on 17 September 2022 at UFC Fight Night 210. However, the week before the event, Chikadze withdrew due to injury and the bout was cancelled.

Chikadze faced Alex Caceres on 26 August 2023, at UFC Fight Night 225. He won the bout via unanimous decision.

Chikadze was scheduled to face Josh Emmett on 16 December 2023, at UFC 296. However, Chikadze withdrew due to an undisclosed injury, and was replaced by Bryce Mitchell.

Chikadze faced Arnold Allen on 27 July 2024, at UFC 304. He lost the fight by unanimous decision.

Chikadze was scheduled to face David Onama on 5 April 2025 at UFC on ESPN 65. However, the bout was moved to on 26 April 2025 at UFC on ESPN 66 for unknown reasons. At the weigh-ins, Chikadze weighed in at 147 pounds, one pounds over the featherweight non-title fight limit. The bout proceeded at catchweight and he was fined 20 percent of his purse, which went to his opponent Onama. He lost the fight by unanimous decision.

Chikadze faced Kevin Vallejos on 13 December 2025 at UFC on ESPN 73. He lost the fight via knockout with spinning backfist and elbows in round two.

Chikadze was scheduled to face Vinicius Oliveira on 20 June 2026, at UFC Fight Night 279. However, Chikadze withdrew for undisclosed reasons.

Chikadze faced Joanderson Brito on 19 September 2026 at UFC 331. He lost the fight by knockout via ground and pound in the first round.

On 20 November 2026, it was reported that Chikadze was removed from the UFC roster.

== Personal life ==
Chikadze has stated that he went to college and graduated with a degree in Business Management.

== Championships and accomplishments ==
=== Mixed martial arts ===
- Ultimate Fighting Championship
  - Performance of the Night (Three times) vs. Jamey Simmons, Cub Swanson and Edson Barboza
  - Fight of the Night (One time) vs. Calvin Kattar
  - 2022 Forrest Griffin Community Award
  - UFC.com Awards
    - 2022: Ranked #8 Fight of the Year vs. Calvin Kattar
- MMA Junkie
  - 2020 Under-the-Radar Fighter of the Year
  - 2021 Breakout Fighter of the Year

== Mixed martial arts record ==
Professional record breakdown
22 matches	15 wins	7 losses
By knockout	9	2
By submission	1	1
By decision	5	4

Res.	Record	Opponent	Method	Event	Date	Round	Time	Location	Notes
Loss	15–7	Joanderson Brito	KO (punches)	UFC 331	19 September 2026	1	1:57	Los Angeles, California, United States	
Loss	15–6	Kevin Vallejos	KO (spinning backfist and elbows)	UFC on ESPN: Royval vs. Kape	13 December 2025	2	1:29	Las Vegas, Nevada, United States	
Loss	15–5	David Onama	Decision (unanimous)	UFC on ESPN: Machado Garry vs. Prates	26 April 2025	3	5:00	Kansas City, Missouri, United States	Catchweight (147 lb) bout; Chikadze missed weight.
Loss	15–4	Arnold Allen	Decision (unanimous)	UFC 304	27 July 2024	3	5:00	Manchester, England	
Win	15–3	Alex Caceres	Decision (unanimous)	UFC Fight Night: Holloway vs. The Korean Zombie	26 August 2023	3	5:00	Kallang, Singapore	
Loss	14–3	Calvin Kattar	Decision (unanimous)	UFC on ESPN: Kattar vs. Chikadze	15 January 2022	5	5:00	Las Vegas, Nevada, United States	Fight of the Night.
Win	14–2	Edson Barboza	TKO (punches)	UFC on ESPN: Barboza vs. Chikadze	28 August 2021	3	1:44	Las Vegas, Nevada, United States	Performance of the Night.
Win	13–2	Cub Swanson	TKO (body kick and punches)	UFC on ESPN: Reyes vs. Procházka	1 May 2021	1	1:03	Las Vegas, Nevada, United States	Performance of the Night.
Win	12–2	Jamey Simmons	TKO (head kick and punches)	UFC on ESPN: Santos vs. Teixeira	7 November 2020	1	3:51	Las Vegas, Nevada, United States	Performance of the Night.
Win	11–2	Omar Morales	Decision (unanimous)	UFC Fight Night: Moraes vs. Sandhagen	11 October 2020	3	5:00	Abu Dhabi, United Arab Emirates	
Win	10–2	Irwin Rivera	Decision (unanimous)	UFC on ESPN: Overeem vs. Harris	16 May 2020	3	5:00	Jacksonville, Florida, United States	
Win	9–2	Jamall Emmers	Decision (split)	UFC 248	7 March 2020	3	5:00	Las Vegas, Nevada, United States	
Win	8–2	Brandon Davis	Decision (split)	UFC Fight Night: Hermansson vs. Cannonier	28 September 2019	3	5:00	Copenhagen, Denmark	
Win	7–2	Damien Manzanares	TKO (submission to punches)	Gladiator Challenge: MMA World Championships	23 March 2019	1	0:45	Lincoln, California, United States	
Win	6–2	C.J. Baines	Submission (armbar)	Gladiator Challenge: Summer Showdown	11 August 2018	1	0:12	Rancho Mirage, California, United States	Lightweight bout.
Loss	5–2	Austin Springer	Submission (rear-naked choke)	Dana White's Contender Series 10	19 June 2018	3	4:10	Las Vegas, Nevada, United States	Featherweight debut.
Win	5–1	Kevin Ceron	TKO (punch)	Gladiator Challenge: MMA Fighting Championship	21 April 2018	1	2:37	Rancho Mirage, California, United States	
Win	4–1	Kevin Gratts	KO (punch)	Gladiator Challenge: Season's Beatings	16 December 2017	1	1:17	Rancho Mirage, California, United States	
Win	3–1	Julian Hernandez	TKO (punch)	Gladiator Challenge: Summer Feud	10 June 2017	1	0:49	Rancho Mirage, California, United States	
Win	2–1	Anthony Ross	TKO (punch)	Gladiator Challenge: Absolute Beat Down	25 March 2017	1	0:10	San Jacinto, California, United States	
Win	1–1	Joe Bear	TKO (retirement)	Gladiator Challenge: Season's Beatings	17 December 2016	1	1:50	San Jacinto, California, United States	
Loss	0–1	Gil Guardado	Decision (unanimous)	WSOF 26	18 December 2015	3	5:00	Las Vegas, Nevada, United States	Lightweight debut.

== Kickboxing record (incomplete) ==
Kickboxing record (incomplete)
38 wins, 12 losses, 0 draws
Date	Result	Opponent	Event	Location	Method	Round	Time
2017-12-23	Loss	(France) Dylan Salvador	Glory of Heroes: Jinan – GOH 65 kg Championship Tournament, Semi-Finals	Jinan, China	Ex. R decision (unanimous)	4	3:00
2017-07-14	Loss	(United States) Kevin VanNostrand	Glory 43: New York – Featherweight Contender Tournament, Final	New York City, New York, US	Decision (unanimous)	3	3:00
For The Featherweight Contender Tournament Finale.
2017-07-14	Win	(Russia) Aleksei Ulianov	Glory 43: New York – Featherweight Championship Tournament, Semi-Finals	New York City, New York, US	Decision (split)	3	3:00
2017-01-20	Win	(France) Victor Pinto	Glory 37: Los Angeles	Los Angeles, California, US	KO (liver kick)	1	2:03
2016-09-09	Loss	(Canada) Matthew Embree	Glory 33: New Jersey – Featherweight Contender Tournament, Final	Trenton, New Jersey, US	TKO (punch)	2	1:28
For The Featherweight Contender Tournament Finale.
2016-09-09	Win	(Ukraine) Serhiy Adamchuk	Glory 33: New Jersey – Featherweight Contender Tournament, Semi-Finals	Trenton, New Jersey, US	Decision (split)	3	3:00
2016-07-22	Win	(United States) Chris Mauceri	Glory 32: Virginia	Norfolk, Virginia, US	KO (liver kick)	1	2:20
2016-02-26	Win	(United States) Kevin VanNostrand	Glory 27: Chicago	Hoffman Estates, Illinois, US	Decision (unanimous)	3	3:00
2015-08-07	Loss	(Uzbekistan) Anvar Boynazarov	Glory 23: Las Vegas	Las Vegas, Nevada, US	Decision (split)	3	3:00
2015-05-08	Win	(Canada) Ken Tran	Glory 21: San Diego	San Diego, California, US	KO	3	2:19
2014-10-04	Win	(Russia) Armen Zakyan	Fight Fans		KO (head kick)	2	0:35
2014-02-08	Loss	(Angola) Christian Baya	Fight Fans VIII	Netherlands	Decision	3	3:00
2014-01-12	Loss	(Turkey) Tayfun Özcan	Enfusion Live 12	Alkmaar, Netherlands	Decision (unanimous)	3	3:00
2013-10-12	Loss	(Germany) Ashkan Gohar	Thai Boxing Gala	Emmen, Netherlands	TKO (doctor stoppage)	1	
2013-02-03	Loss	(Spain) Abraham Roqueñi	Street Culture Fight Night 2	Tenerife, Spain	KO (back kick)	1	
2012-12-28	Win	(Republic of Ireland) Anthony Kane	Soema Na Basi	Paramaribo, Suriname	Decision	3	3:00
2012-12-01	Win	(Netherlands) Hicham Boubkari	Zaansation II	Zaandam, Netherlands	Decision	5	3:00
2012-05-27	Win	(Morocco) Otman Allach	Muay Thai event Slamm 7	Almere, Netherlands	Decision	3	3:00
2012-03-06	Loss	(Albania) Shkodran Veseli	WFC Challengers 3	Vienna, Austria	KO (punches)	2	
2011-05-21	Win	(Russia) Evgeniy Kurovskoy	Fightclub presents: It's Showtime 2011	Amsterdam, Netherlands	Decision (unanimous)	3	3:00
2011-04-10	Win	(Netherlands) Nordin Kassrioui			TKO (doctor stoppage)	1	
2010-06-26	Loss	(Switzerland) Didic Selmedin	Best of Leone II, Final	Bern, Switzerland	Decision	3	3:00
2010-06-26	Loss	(Switzerland) Butrint Rama	Best of Leone II, Semifinals	Bern, Switzerland	Decision	3	3:00
Chikadze goes through despite the loss due an injury suffered by Rama.
2009-12-19	Loss	(Albania) Shemsi Beqiri	WFC Fight Night	Zürich, Switzerland	Decision	5	3:00
For the WFC World Middleweight (-72.5 kg/160 lb) Muay Thai Championship.
Legend: Win Loss Draw/no contest Notes

== See also ==
- List of Dana White's Contender Series alumni
- List of male mixed martial artists
