= Calvin Kattar =

American mixed martial artist (born 1988)

- Born: Calvin Kattar; March 26, 1988 (age 38); Methuen, Massachusetts, U.S.
- Other names: The Boston Finisher
- Height: 5 ft 11 in (180 cm)
- Weight: 145 lb (66 kg; 10 st 5 lb)
- Division: Lightweight; Featherweight
- Reach: 72 in (183 cm)
- Style: Wrestling
- Fighting out of: Methuen, Massachusetts, U.S.
- Team: New England Cartel (2015–present); Lauzon MMA; Hard Knocks Boston; 617 Fight Sports; Team Sityodtong
- Rank: Blue belt in Brazilian Jiu-Jitsu
- Years active: 2007–present

Mixed martial arts record
- Total: 33
- Wins: 23
- By knockout: 11
- By submission: 2
- By decision: 10
- Losses: 10
- By knockout: 1
- By submission: 1
- By decision: 8

Other information
- Mixed martial arts record from Sherdog

Calvin Kattar (/ˈkeɪtər/ KAY-tər; born March 26, 1988) is an American professional mixed martial artist and owner of MMA promotion Combat Zone. He currently competes in the Featherweight division of the Ultimate Fighting Championship (UFC). A professional since 2007, Kattar formerly competed for EliteXC.

== Background ==
The son of James and Sandra Kattar, Calvin was born and raised in Methuen, Massachusetts. He has Lebanese ancestry. His family runs a golf course. He has two brothers and a sister. After initiating in the sport in ninth grade, Kattar was a standout wrestler at Methuen High School, being ranked as high as eighth in the state (160 pounds) and placing fifth at the Division I MIAA state championships as a senior in 2006. After graduating, he was unsure whether he should wrestle in college or not, and ended up opting to pursue a career in mixed martial arts. He went on to earn an associate degree at Middlesex Community College. In an interview, Kattar expressed that he got a chance to train with Nick and Nate Diaz when he was 19 years old, and how that influenced his way of training, stating:

“I got like three bloody noses a day. I’m out there dogging it out. I’m by myself. But it was a great opportunity. Long term I was able to see these guys and how they train on the West Coast. Watching the Diaz brothers train at 1 a.m. and realizing you can lie to yourself and say guys aren’t training like that, but somewhere they are. I was exposed to that, which is great."

== Mixed martial arts career ==
Kattar won eight consecutive bouts and was unbeaten in over seven years competing on the regional circuit primarily in his native New England prior to his UFC career.

=== Ultimate Fighting Championship ===
Kattar made his UFC debut replacing Choi Doo-ho against Andre Fili on July 29, 2017 at UFC 214. Kattar won the fight by unanimous decision.

Kattar faced undefeated prospect Shane Burgos on January 20, 2018 at UFC 220. Kattar won the fight via technical knock out in round three. The fight was awarded the Fight of the Night bonus.

Kattar faced Renato Moicano on April 7, 2018 at UFC 223. He lost the fight by unanimous decision.

Kattar faced promotional newcomer Chris Fishgold on October 27, 2018 at UFC Fight Night 138. He won the fight via technical knockout in the first round. By the bout, Kattar fulfilled his first four-fight contract with the UFC.

Kattar faced Ricardo Lamas at UFC 238 on June 8, 2019. He won the fight via knockout in the first round.

Kattar was scheduled to face Zabit Magomedsharipov on October 18, 2019 at UFC on ESPN 6. However, Magomedsharipov was removed from the card due to injury on September 13 and the pairing was rescheduled for the following month at UFC on ESPN+ 21. He lost the fight via unanimous decision. This fight earned him the Fight of the Night award.

Kattar was scheduled to face Jeremy Stephens on April 18, 2020 at UFC 249. However, on April 9, Dana White, the president of UFC announced that this event was postponed and the bout eventually took place on May 9, 2020. At the weigh-ins on May 8, Stephens missed weight, weighing in at 150.5 pounds, 4.5 pounds over the non-title featherweight limit. As a result, the bout proceeded as a catchweight bout and Stephens was fined 20% of his purse which went to Kattar. Kattar won the fight via technical knockout in round two.

The first bout of his new six-fight contract came against Dan Ige on July 16, 2020 at UFC on ESPN: Kattar vs. Ige. Kattar won the fight via unanimous decision.

Next, Kattar faced former UFC Featherweight champion Max Holloway, while headlining UFC on ABC 1 on January 16, 2021. In a one-sided fight where Kattar suffered plenty of physical trauma due to Holloway's strikes, which set multiple UFC records, he was defeated by unanimous decision. Despite being a one-sided fight, both competitors earned the Fight of the Night award as Kattar was able to land powerful strikes of his own, despite all the damage he received.

Kattar faced Giga Chikadze on January 15, 2022 at UFC on ESPN 32. He won the fight via unanimous decision after knocking down and almost finishing Chikadze in the final seconds of the bout. This fight earned him the Fight of the Night award.

Kattar faced Josh Emmett on June 18, 2022 in the main event at UFC on ESPN 37. He lost the close bout via split decision. 14 of 19 MMA media outlets scored the bout in favor of Kattar. This fight earned him his third consecutive Fight of the Night award.

Kattar faced Arnold Allen on October 29, 2022 at UFC Fight Night 213. He lost the fight via technical knockout following a knee injury.

Kattar faced former UFC Bantamweight champion Aljamain Sterling on April 13, 2024 at UFC 300. Kattar lost the fight by unanimous decision.

Kattar was scheduled to face Kyle Nelson on September 7, 2024, at UFC Fight Night 242. However, Kattar withdrew from the bout for unknown reasons and was replaced by Steve Garcia.

Kattar faced Youssef Zalal on February 15, 2025 at UFC Fight Night 251. He lost the fight by unanimous decision.

Kattar faced Steve Garcia on July 12, 2025 at UFC on ESPN 70. He lost the fight by unanimous decision.

== Championships and accomplishments ==
=== Mixed martial arts ===
- Ultimate Fighting Championship
  - Fight of the Night (Five times) vs. Shane Burgos, Zabit Magomedsharipov, Max Holloway, Giga Chikadze and Josh Emmett
  - UFC.com Awards
    - 2018: Ranked #8 Fight of the Year vs. Shane Burgos
    - 2020: Ranked #9 Knockout of the Year vs. Jeremy Stephens
    - 2022: Ranked #8 Fight of the Year vs. Giga Chikadze
- MMA Junkie
  - 2020 May Knockout of the Month vs. Jeremy Stephens
- Slacky Awards
  - 2022 Gameplan of the Year vs. Giga Chikadze at UFC on ESPN: Kattar vs. Chikadze

== Mixed martial arts record ==
Professional record breakdown
33 matches	23 wins	10 losses
By knockout	11	1
By submission	2	1
By decision	10	8

Res.	Record	Opponent	Method	Event	Date	Round	Time	Location	Notes
Loss	23–10	Steve Garcia	Decision (unanimous)	UFC on ESPN: Lewis vs. Teixeira	July 12, 2025	3	5:00	Nashville, Tennessee, United States	
Loss	23–9	Youssef Zalal	Decision (unanimous)	UFC Fight Night: Cannonier vs. Rodrigues	February 15, 2025	3	5:00	Las Vegas, Nevada, United States	
Loss	23–8	Aljamain Sterling	Decision (unanimous)	UFC 300	April 13, 2024	3	5:00	Las Vegas, Nevada, United States	
Loss	23–7	Arnold Allen	TKO (knee injury)	UFC Fight Night: Kattar vs. Allen	October 29, 2022	2	0:08	Las Vegas, Nevada, United States	
Loss	23–6	Josh Emmett	Decision (split)	UFC on ESPN: Kattar vs. Emmett	June 18, 2022	5	5:00	Austin, Texas, United States	Fight of the Night.
Win	23–5	Giga Chikadze	Decision (unanimous)	UFC on ESPN: Kattar vs. Chikadze	January 15, 2022	5	5:00	Las Vegas, Nevada, United States	Fight of the Night.
Loss	22–5	Max Holloway	Decision (unanimous)	UFC on ABC: Holloway vs. Kattar	January 16, 2021	5	5:00	Abu Dhabi, United Arab Emirates	Fight of the Night.
Win	22–4	Dan Ige	Decision (unanimous)	UFC on ESPN: Kattar vs. Ige	July 16, 2020	5	5:00	Abu Dhabi, United Arab Emirates	
Win	21–4	Jeremy Stephens	KO (elbows)	UFC 249	May 9, 2020	2	2:42	Jacksonville, Florida, United States	Catchweight (150.5 lb) bout; Stephens missed weight.
Loss	20–4	Zabit Magomedsharipov	Decision (unanimous)	UFC Fight Night: Magomedsharipov vs. Kattar	November 9, 2019	3	5:00	Moscow, Russia	Fight of the Night.
Win	20–3	Ricardo Lamas	KO (punches)	UFC 238	June 8, 2019	1	4:06	Chicago, Illinois, United States	
Win	19–3	Chris Fishgold	TKO (punches)	UFC Fight Night: Volkan vs. Smith	October 27, 2018	1	4:11	Moncton, New Brunswick, Canada	
Loss	18–3	Renato Moicano	Decision (unanimous)	UFC 223	April 7, 2018	3	5:00	Brooklyn, New York, United States	
Win	18–2	Shane Burgos	TKO (punches)	UFC 220	January 20, 2018	3	0:32	Boston, Massachusetts, United States	Fight of the Night.
Win	17–2	Andre Fili	Decision (unanimous)	UFC 214	July 29, 2017	3	5:00	Anaheim, California, United States	
Win	16–2	Chris Foster	Decision (unanimous)	CES MMA 38	September 23, 2016	3	5:00	Mashantucket, Connecticut, United States	
Win	15–2	Kenny Foster	Decision (split)	CES MMA 34	April 1, 2016	3	5:00	Mashantucket, Connecticut, United States	
Win	14–2	Gabriel Baino	Decision (unanimous)	Combat Zone 44	June 14, 2013	3	5:00	Salem, New Hampshire, United States	
Win	13–2	Saul Almeida	Decision (unanimous)	CES MMA 13	October 6, 2012	3	5:00	Providence, Rhode Island, United States	
Win	12–2	Cody Stevens	Decision (unanimous)	Combat Zone 39	October 21, 2011	3	5:00	Salem, New Hampshire, United States	Featherweight debut.
Win	11–2	Luiz Rodrigues	Decision (unanimous)	Combat Zone 36	January 28, 2011	3	5:00	Salem, New Hampshire, United States	
Win	10–2	Chris Connor	TKO (punches)	Combat Zone 33	June 19, 2010	1	3:40	Gilford, New Hampshire, United States	
Win	9–2	Jeff Anderson	TKO (punches)	Xtreme Championship Fight League 2	March 26, 2010	3	4:05	Lowell, Massachusetts, United States	
Loss	8–2	Don Carlo-Clauss	Decision (split)	Xtreme Championship Fight League 1	February 6, 2010	3	5:00	Marlborough, Massachusetts, United States	
Win	8–1	Andrew Montanez	Decision (unanimous)	American Steel Cagefighting 2	September 11, 2009	5	5:00	Salem, New Hampshire, United States	
Win	7–1	Rodrigo Almeida	Submission (guillotine choke)	World Championship Fighting 7	June 27, 2009	1	2:16	Wilmington, Massachusetts, United States	
Win	6–1	Jonathan Bermudez	TKO (punches)	Combat Zone 27	February 6, 2009	1	0:29	Salem, New Hampshire, United States	
Win	5–1	Bobby Diaz	Submission (triangle choke)	World Championship Fighting 5	November 14, 2008	1	1:21	Wilmington, Massachusetts, United States	
Win	4–1	Kevin Roddy	KO (punches)	Combat Zone 26	September 26, 2008	1	0:47	Salem, New Hampshire, United States	
Loss	3–1	James Jones	Submission (rear-naked choke)	EliteXC: Primetime	May 31, 2008	1	4:49	Newark, New Jersey, United States	
Win	3–0	Bob Pupa	TKO (submission to punches)	Combat Zone 24	October 13, 2007	1	0:51	Revere, Massachusetts, United States	
Win	2–0	Donald Peters	TKO (punches)	Combat Zone 23	August 25, 2007	1	N/A	Revere, Massachusetts, United States	
Win	1–0	Tony Armijo	TKO (punches)	Combat Zone 22	June 23, 2007	1	2:02	Derry, New Hampshire, United States	Lightweight debut.

== See also ==
- List of current UFC fighters
- List of male mixed martial artists
