= Tucumã, Pará =

Tucumã
- Municipality
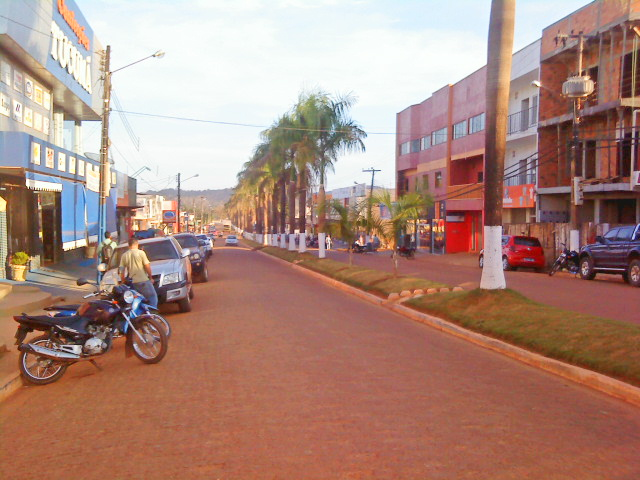

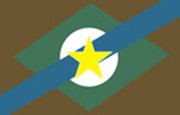
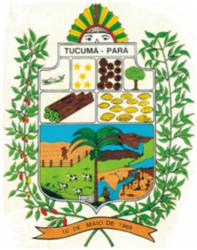
- Flag Coat of arms

- Coordinates: 6°45′07″S 51°09′14″W
- Country: Brazil
- Region: Northern
- State: Pará
- Mesoregion: Sudeste Paraense

Population (2020)
  - Total: 40,136
- Time zone: UTC−3 (BRT)

Tucumã is a municipality in the state of Pará in the Northern region of Brazil. It is located in the southeastern region of the state, approximately 882 km away from the capital. The town experienced significant population growth in the 1980s due to favorable agricultural conditions, timber exploitation, and gold extraction. It has a total area of 2,535.11 km^{2} and is part of the now-extinct Grande Carajás Program. According to the latest data from 2020, Tucumã had a population of 40,136 inhabitants. The municipality has a medium Human Development Index (HDI) of 0.747 and a per capita income of R$ 15,452.90. Tucumã, along with the neighboring city of Ourilândia do Norte, forms the only conurbated area in the southeastern part of Pará.

== See also ==
- List of municipalities in Pará
