= Danny Mitchell (fighter) =

English mixed martial arts fighter

- Born: 8 August 1986 (age 40); Doncaster, England
- Other names: The Cheesecake Assassin
- Nationality: English
- Height: 6 ft 2 in (1.88 m)
- Weight: 185 lb (84 kg; 13 st 3 lb)
- Division: Middleweight; Welterweight
- Reach: 74.5 in (189 cm)
- Fighting out of: Yorkshire, England
- Team: Asylum Vale Tudo
- Years active: 2008 – 2017

Mixed martial arts record
- Total: 30
- Wins: 20
- By knockout: 6
- By submission: 12
- By decision: 2
- Losses: 9
- By knockout: 4
- By submission: 1
- By decision: 4
- Draws: 1

Other information
- Mixed martial arts record from Sherdog

Danny Mitchell (born 8 August 1986) is a retired English mixed martial artist. He is currently the head coach at Asylum Vale Tudo.

== Early career ==
Mitchell became a professional fighter in 2008 and fought the first eight fights of his career in regional promotions mostly throughout his native Northern England, compiling an impressive 8–0 record with 6 stoppages. He then moved onto headlining slots against other European standouts such as fellow future UFC competitors Gunnar Nelson, Nico Musoke and Cathal Pendred.

== Ultimate Fighting Championship ==
With a 14-4-1 record which included wins over former UFC fighters Mitchell was signed by the UFC in December 2013.

Mitchell debuted against Igor Araujo on 8 March 2014 at UFC Fight Night 37 and lost via unanimous decision.

Mitchell was expected to face Li Jingliang at UFC 173. However, Mitchell was forced out of the bout with an injury.

Mitchell next faced Wang Sai on 23 August 2014 at UFC Fight Night 48 in Macau. Mitchell lost the bout via unanimous decision and was subsequently released by the promotion.

== European Circuit, Bellator and Retirement ==
After his release from the UFC he continued to fight in Europe taking fights in the UK and Bulgaria. On July 16, 2016, he fought on Bellator 158 against CJ Meeks, he won the bout by submission using the Twister technique, this was the first Twister submission within the Bellator promotion.

He announced his retirement from MMA in 2017.

== Mixed martial arts record ==
Professional record breakdown
29 matches	20 wins	9 losses
By knockout	6	4
By submission	12	1
By decision	2	4

Res.	Record	Opponent	Method	Event	Date	Round	Time	Location	Notes
Win	20–9–1	Ben Schneider	TKO (strikes)	CSFC 18	15 July 2017	1	1:25	Doncaster, England	
Loss	19–9–1	Andy DeVent	KO (punches)	ACB 54	11 March 2017	1	0:35	Manchester, England	
Win	19–8–1	Dan Sach	Submission (armbar)	Celtic Gladiator 10	5 November 2011	1	0:00	London, England	
Loss	18–8–1	Jake Bostwick	KO (punch)	ACB 47	1 October 2016	1	3:53	Glasgow, Scotland	
Win	18–7–1	CJ Meeks	Submission (twister)	Bellator 158	16 July 2016	1	4:25	London, England	
Win	17–7–1	Shaun Lomas	Submission (heel hook)	ICE FC 9	20 November 2015	1	0:00	Manchester, England	
Win	16–7–1	Brad Carter-Conway	TKO (elbow)	CSFC 12	18 July 2015	1	2:57	Doncaster, England	
Loss	15–7–1	Nikola Dipchikov	Decision (unanimous)	Twins MMA 10	8 May 2015	3	5:00	Sofia, Bulgaria	
Win	15–6–1	Kevin Reed	TKO (elbows)	CSFC 10	6 December 2014	2	2:07	Doncaster, England	
Loss	14–6–1	Wang Sai	Decision (unanimous)	UFC Fight Night: Bisping vs. Le	23 August 2014	3	5:00	Macau, China	
Loss	14–5–1	Igor Araujo	Decision (unanimous)	UFC Fight Night: Gustafsson vs. Manuwa	8 March 2014	3	5:00	London, England	
Win	14–4–1	Besam Yousef	Submission (rear-naked choke)	Superior Challenge 9	23 November 2013	2	2:13	Gothenburg, Sweden	
Win	13–4–1	Victor Peixoto	Submission (twister)	Caged Fighters 6	11 October 2013	1	0:50	Leeds, England	
Loss	12–4–1	Kendall Grove	TKO (punches)	GWC 1: USA vs UK	29 June 2013	1	4:53	Kansas City, Missouri, USA	
Win	12–3–1	Lee Livesly	TKO (punches)	Caged Fury 1	4 August 2012	1	0:12	Barnsley, England	
Win	11–3–1	Malcolm Richardson	KO (elbow)	Cage Confrontation 6	7 July 2012	1	1:11	York, England	
Win	10–3–1	Dean Amasinger	Submission (flying triangle choke)	BAMMA 8	10 December 2011	2	2:28	Nottingham, England	
Draw	9–3–1	Cathal Pendred	Decision (draw)	Cage Warriors Fight Night 2	8 September 2011	3	5:00	Amman, Jordan	
Loss	9–3	Henrique Santana	Decision (unanimous)	WFC 1	7 May 2011	3	5:00	London, England	
Win	9–2	Nico Musoke	Submission (armbar)	Superior Challenge 6	29 October 2010	2	1:56	Stockholm, Sweden	
Loss	8–2	Gunnar Nelson	Submission (rear-naked choke)	Cage Contender 6	28 August 2010	1	2:51	Manchester, England	
Loss	8–1	Eugene Fadiora	TKO (punches)	Bushido Challenge 2	3 April 2010	3	2:19	Nottingham, England	
Win	8–0	Simon Phillips	TKO (punches)	KUMMA 4	20 February 2010	3	0:40	Cheltenham, England	
Win	7–0	Sami Berik	Submission (rear-naked choke)	Bushido Challenge 1	13 December 2009	1	3:09	Norwich, England	
Win	6–0	Jordan James	Submission (guillotine choke)	KUMMA 3	1 November 2009	2	0:00	Newport, Wales	
Win	5–0	Leslee Ojugbana	Submission (rear-naked choke)	Total Combat 31	5 September 2009	3	4:56	Sunderland, England	
Win	4–0	Lee Doski	Submission (heel hook)	Ultimate Force: Olivion	16 May 2009	1	2:01	Doncaster, England	
Win	3–0	Andrew McQueen	Decision (split)	Total Combat 28	21 February 2009	3	5:00	Sunderland, England	
Win	2–0	Runar Gundersen	Decision (split)	Total Combat 28	21 February 2009	3	5:00	Sunderland, England	
Win	1–0	Greg Letch	Submission (achilles lock)	Ultimate Force: Nemesis	1 November 2008	1	1:59	Doncaster, England	

== See also ==
- List of current UFC fighters
- List of male mixed martial artists
