= UFC Fight Night: Saint Preux vs. Okami =

UFC mixed martial arts event in 2017

- The poster for UFC Fight Night: Saint Preux vs. Okami
- Promotion: Ultimate Fighting Championship
- Date: September 23, 2017
- Venue: Saitama Super Arena
- City: Saitama, Japan
- Attendance: 8,571

Event chronology
UFC Fight Night: Rockhold vs. Branch	UFC Fight Night: Saint Preux vs. Okami	UFC 216: Ferguson vs. Lee

UFC Fight Night: Saint Preux vs. Okami (also known as UFC Fight Night 117) was a mixed martial arts event produced by the Ultimate Fighting Championship held on September 23, 2017, at Saitama Super Arena in Saitama, Japan.

== Background ==
The event was the fifth that the organization has hosted in Saitama, and first since UFC Fight Night: Barnett vs. Nelson in September 2015.

A light heavyweight rematch between former UFC Light Heavyweight Champion Maurício Rua and former interim title challenger Ovince Saint Preux was expected to headline this event. The pairing met previously at UFC Fight Night: Shogun vs. Saint Preux in November 2014 where Saint Preux defeated Rua via knockout in the fight's opening minute. On September 16, Rua withdrew from the fight due to a knee injury and was replaced by returning veteran, former UFC Middleweight Championship challenger Yushin Okami.

Naoki Inoue was expected to face Jenel Lausa at the event, but pulled out on September 9 due to a dislocated shoulder. As a result, Lausa was removed from the card and is expected to be rescheduled against a new opponent at a future event.

At the weigh-ins, Mizuto Hirota missed the featherweight limit of 146 pounds, coming in at 150 pounds. As a result, his bout with Charles Rosa was changed to a catchweight and the fight was initially expected to proceed as scheduled. Subsequently, Hirota was fined 30% of his purse. Later that day, Hirota was pulled due to health and safety concerns, as he was deemed unfit to compete by the UFC medical team.

== Results ==
Main Card (FXX)
Weight class				Method	Round	Time	Notes
Light Heavyweight	Ovince Saint Preux	def.	Yushin Okami	Technical Submission (Von Flue choke)	1	1:50
Women's Strawweight	Jéssica Andrade	def.	Cláudia Gadelha	Decision (unanimous) (30–25, 30–26, 30–27)	3	5:00
Lightweight	Dong Hyun Ma	def.	Takanori Gomi	TKO (punches)	1	1:30
Light Heavyweight	Gökhan Saki	def.	Henrique da Silva	KO (punch)	1	4:45
Featherweight	Teruto Ishihara	def.	Rolando Dy	Decision (unanimous) (28–27, 28–27, 29–27)	3	5:00	(Note: Dy was deducted one point in round 3 due to repeated groin strikes.)
Flyweight	Jussier Formiga	def.	Ulka Sasaki	Submission (rear-naked choke)	1	4:30
Preliminary Card (FXX)
Welterweight	Keita Nakamura	def.	Alex Morono	Decision (split) (29–28, 28–29, 29–28)	3	5:00
Women's Strawweight	Syuri Kondo	def.	Chan-Mi Jeon	Decision (split) (28–29, 30–27, 30–27)	3	5:00
Welterweight	Shinsho Anzai	def.	Luke Jumeau	Decision (unanimous) (29–28, 29–28, 30–27)	3	5:00
Welterweight	Daichi Abe	def.	Hyun Gyu Lim	Decision (unanimous) (29–28, 29–28, 29–28)	3	5:00

== Bonus awards ==
The following fighters were awarded $50,000 bonuses:

- Fight of the Night: Jéssica Andrade vs. Cláudia Gadelha
- Performance of the Night: Ovince Saint Preux and Gökhan Saki

== See also ==
- List of UFC events
- 2017 in UFC
