= Road to UFC: Japan =

MMA competition

- Genre: Sports
- Created by: Dana White
- Starring: Dana White
- Country of origin: Singapore

Production
- Running time: 60 minutes

Original release
- Release: August 10 – September 27, 2015

Related
- Road to UFC

Road to UFC: Japan is an American reality television series and Ultimate Fighting Championship (UFC) mixed martial arts (MMA) competition. The series featured eight Japanese featherweight fighters with former champion Josh Barnett and Roy Nelson as coaches. The show started on July 6, 2015 and the finale aired on September 27, 2015 at UFC Fight Night: Barnett vs. Nelson.

== Background ==
Road to UFC: Japan started from July 6, 2015 and ended on September 27, 2015 at UFC Fight Night: Barnett vs. Nelson. The show was slightly different from The Ultimate Fighter in that participants did not share a house but trained in their home towns and in Las Vegas at the UFC Gym under the supervision of coaches of Roy Nelson and Josh Barnett.

== Cast ==
=== Coaches and Trainers ===
Team Nelson's

- Mizuto Hirota
- Akiyo Nishiura
- Tatsunao Nagakura
- Nobumitsu Osawa

Team Barnett's

- Daiki Hata
- Teruto Ishihara
- Tatsuya Ando
- Hiroyuki Oshiro

== Tournament Bracket ==
Quarter-finals
Hiroyuki Oshiro	1
Akiyo Nishiura	TKO
Tatsunao Nagakura	2
Daiki Hata	UD
Nobumitsu Osawa	2
Mizuto Hirota	Majority Decision
Tatsuya Ando	2
Teruto Ishihaba	Majority Decision

Semi-finals
Teruto Ishihaba	UD
Akiyo Nishiura	3
Mizuto Hirota	UD
Daiki Hata	3

Final
Teruto Ishihaba	Draw
Mizuto Hirota	3

  - The final of the bout was between Mizuto Hirota and Teruto Ishihara. The fight ended in split draw and both fighters were awarded the UFC contracts.

== Coaches' Fight ==
UFC Fight Night: Barnett vs. Nelson was held on September 27, 2015, at Saitama Super Arena in Saitama, Japan.

- Heavyweight bout: Josh Barnett vs. Roy Nelson

Barnett defeated Nelson via unanimous decision.

== See also ==
- Ultimate Fighting Championship
- Road to UFC
