= UFC Fight Night: dos Santos vs. Tuivasa =

UFC mixed martial arts event in 2018

- The poster for UFC Fight Night: dos Santos vs. Tuivasa
- Promotion: Ultimate Fighting Championship
- Date: December 2, 2018
- Venue: Adelaide Entertainment Centre
- City: Adelaide, Australia
- Attendance: 8,652
- Total gate: $1,026,937

Event chronology
The Ultimate Fighter: Heavy Hitters Finale	UFC Fight Night: dos Santos vs. Tuivasa	UFC 231: Holloway vs. Ortega

UFC Fight Night: dos Santos vs. Tuivasa (also known as UFC Fight Night 142) was a mixed martial arts event produced by the Ultimate Fighting Championship that was held on December 2, 2018 at Adelaide Entertainment Centre in Adelaide, Australia.

== Background ==
The event was the second that the promotion has contested in Adelaide, following UFC Fight Night: Miocic vs. Hunt in May 2015.

A heavyweight bout between former UFC Heavyweight Champion Junior dos Santos and Tai Tuivasa served as the event headliner.

The Ultimate Fighter: United States vs. United Kingdom lightweight winner Ross Pearson was expected to face Joseph Duffy at the event. However, Pearson announced on 7 November that he was out of the bout due to a broken nose and subsequent surgery to correct the injury. He was replaced by promotional newcomer Damir Ismagulov, but Duffy pulled out of citing a rib injury. Ismagulov then faced fellow newcomer Alex Gorgees.

Ashkan Mokhtarian was scheduled to face promotional newcomer Kai Kara-France at the event. However, on 20 November, Mokhtarian pulled out of the fight citing injury. He was replaced by Elias Garcia.

Luke Jumeau was scheduled to face Geoff Neal at the event. However, it was reported on 9 November 2018 that Jumeau pulled from the card due to injury, resulting cancellation of the bout by the UFC official.

== Results ==
Main card (Fox Sports 1)
Weight class				Method	Round	Time	Notes
Heavyweight	Junior dos Santos	def.	Tai Tuivasa	TKO (punches)	2	2:30
Light Heavyweight	Maurício Rua	def.	Tyson Pedro	TKO (punches)	3	0:43
Heavyweight	Justin Willis	def.	Mark Hunt	Decision (unanimous) (29–28, 29–28, 29–28)	3	5:00
Welterweight	Anthony Rocco Martin	def.	Jake Matthews	Technical Submission (anaconda choke)	3	1:19
Featherweight	Sodiq Yusuff	def.	Suman Mokhtarian	TKO (punches)	1	2:14
Light Heavyweight	Jimmy Crute	def.	Paul Craig	Submission (kimura)	3	4:51
Preliminary card (Fox Sports 1)
Welterweight	Alexey Kunchenko	def.	Yushin Okami	Decision (unanimous) (30–26, 30–26, 30–27)	3	5:00
Flyweight	Wilson Reis	def.	Ben Nguyen	Decision (unanimous) (30–27, 30–27, 30–27)	3	5:00
Welterweight	Keita Nakamura	def.	Salim Touahri	Decision (split) (30–27, 28–29, 29–28)	3	5:00
Flyweight	Kai Kara-France	def.	Elias Garcia	Decision (unanimous) (30–25, 30–25, 30–26)	3	5:00
Early Preliminary card (UFC Fight Pass)
Lightweight	Christos Giagos	def.	Mizuto Hirota	Decision (unanimous) (29–28, 29–27, 30–28)	3	5:00
Lightweight	Damir Ismagulov	def.	Alex Gorgees	Decision (unanimous) (30–25, 30–26, 30–26)	3	5:00

== Bonus awards ==
The following fighters were awarded $50,000 bonuses:

- Fight of the Night: Kai Kara-France vs. Elias Garcia
- Performance of the Night: Maurício Rua and Sodiq Yusuff

== See also ==
- 2018 in UFC
- List of UFC events
- Mixed martial arts in Australia
