= Teruto Ishihara =

Japanese mixed martial arts fighter

- Born: July 23, 1991 (age 35); Ōshima District, Kagoshima, Japan
- Other names: Yashabo ("Rascal")
- Height: 5 ft 7 in (1.70 m)
- Weight: 135.5 lb (61.5 kg; 9.68 st)
- Division: Bantamweight; Featherweight
- Reach: 69 in (180 cm)
- Style: Shootfighting, Kickboxing
- Fighting out of: Sacramento, California, U.S.
- Team: Team Alpha Male (2015–present)
- Years active: 2011–present

Mixed martial arts record
- Total: 31
- Wins: 14
- By knockout: 11
- By submission: 1
- By decision: 2
- Losses: 14
- By knockout: 3
- By submission: 4
- By decision: 7
- Draws: 3

Other information
- Mixed martial arts record from Sherdog

Teruto Ishihara (born July 23, 1991) is a Japanese professional mixed martial artist who previously competed in the Featherweight division of the Ultimate Fighting Championship. A professional competitor since 2011, he has formerly competed for Shooto.

== Mixed martial arts career ==
=== Early career ===
Ishihara began his professional MMA career in 2011, debuting in the Shooto promotion. Over the next four-and-a-half years he amassed a record of 7–2–1.

=== Road to UFC: Japan ===
In June 2015, Ishihara was announced as one of the eight featherweights competing on Road to UFC: Japan, a show in the style of The Ultimate Fighter. Ishihara faced Tatsuya Ando in the quarterfinals and won by majority decision. He then faced Akiyo Nishiura in the semifinals and again won by decision.

Ishihara ultimately faced Mizuto Hirota in the finals at UFC Fight Night 75 on September 27, 2015. The bout was ruled a split draw with no winner decided. The UFC announced post-fight that Hirota and Ishihara would both be awarded contracts.

=== Ultimate Fighting Championship ===
In his second fight for the promotion, Ishihara faced Julian Erosa on March 5, 2016, at UFC 196. Ishihara won the fight via KO early in the second round.

Ishihara next faced Horacio Gutiérrez on August 6, 2016, at UFC Fight Night 92. Ishihara won the fight via first-round KO and subsequently received a Performance of the Night bonus.

Ishihara faced Artem Lobov on November 19, 2016, at UFC Fight Night 99. He lost the fight via unanimous decision.

Ishihara faced Gray Maynard on July 7, 2017, at The Ultimate Fighter 25 Finale. He lost the fight by unanimous decision.

Ishihara faced Rolando Dy on September 23, 2017, at UFC Fight Night: Saint Preux vs. Okami. He knocked down Dy 20 second in round one but Dy managed to survive. Throughout the fight Dy kicked three times to Ishihara's groin area and was deducted a point by the referee. After three rounds fight, the judges awarded the win to Ishihara via unanimous decision (28–27, 28–27, and 29–27) ended Ishihara 2 fight losing streak.

Ishihara faced José Alberto Quiñónez in a bantamweight bout on February 10, 2018, at UFC 221. He lost the fight via unanimous decision.

Ishihara faced promotional newcomer Petr Yan on June 23, 2018, at UFC Fight Night 132. He lost the fight via knockout in the first round.

Ishihara faced Kang Kyung-ho on February 10, 2019, at UFC 234. He lost the fight via a submission in round one and was subsequently released from the promotion.

=== Post-UFC career ===
After the release, Ishihara returned to Shooto and made his comeback against Kazuma Sone at Shooto 0131 on January 31, 2021. He lost the fight via unanimous decision.

Ishihara then faced Levi Mowles at Fury FC 48 on July 25, 2021. He lost the fight via first-round submission.

Ishihara faced Vinicius Zani at Fury FC 52 on October 17, 2021. The bout was declared a draw.

Ishihara faced Jose Hernandez at the inaugural Urijah Faber's A1 Combat event, held on May 1, 2022. He won the fight by a second-round technical knockout.

Ishihara faced Westin Wilson at XMMA 5 on July 23, 2022. He won the fight by a first-round knockout, flooring Wilson with a left straight.

Ishihara faced Francisco Rivera on August 20, 2022, at UNF 2. He lost the bout via unanimous decision.

Ishihara faced Willie Gates on March 18, 2023, at Urijah Faber's A1 Combat 9, submitting Gates in the first round via rear-naked choke.

Ishihara faced Vince Morales on May 3, 2023, at XMMA 6: Bash at the Beach. He lost the fight by a third-round submission.

== Championships and accomplishments ==
=== Mixed martial arts ===
- Ultimate Fighting Championship
  - Road to UFC: Japan Featherweight Tournament Co-Winner (Drew with Mizuto Hirota)
  - Performance of the Night (One time) vs. Horacio Gutiérrez

== Mixed martial arts record ==
Professional record breakdown
32 matches	14 wins	15 losses
By knockout	11	3
By submission	1	4
By decision	2	8
Draws	3	

Res.	Record	Opponent	Method	Event	Date	Round	Time	Location	Notes
Loss	14–15–3	Yuto Iino	TKO (punches)	Lemino Shooto Vol.6	June 1, 2026	2	4:21	Tokyo, Japan	
Loss	14–14–3	Ryuho Miyaguchi	Decision (unanimous)	Shooto 2025 Vol.10	November 22, 2025	3	5:00	Osaka, Japan	Bantamweight bout.
Loss	14–13–3	Taichi Aoi	KO (punches)	Shooto 2025 Vol.4	May 18, 2025	1	2:07	Tokyo, Japan	
Win	14–12–3	Go Todoroki	KO (punch)	Shooto 2024 Final in Osaka	December 28, 2024	1	0:50	Osaka, Japan	Return to Featherweight.
Loss	13–12–3	Bruno Souza	Decision (unanimous)	Urijah Faber's A1 Combat 14	September 2, 2023	3	5:00	Los Angeles, California, United States	
Loss	13–11–3	Vince Morales	Technical Submission (anaconda choke)	XMMA 6	May 3, 2023	3	1:17	Myrtle Beach, South Carolina, United States	Catchweight (140 lb) bout.
Win	13–10–3	Willie Gates	Submission (rear-naked choke)	Urijah Faber's A1 Combat 9	March 18, 2023	1	3:12	Long Beach, California, United States	
Loss	12–10–3	Francisco Rivera	Decision (unanimous)	UNF 2	August 20, 2022	3	5:00	Commerce, California, United States	Catchweight (140 lb) bout.
Win	12–9–3	Westin Wilson	KO (punch)	XMMA 5	July 23, 2022	1	3:25	Columbia, South Carolina, United States	Featherweight bout.
Win	11–9–3	Jose Hernandez	TKO (punches)	Urijah Faber's A1 Combat 1	May 1, 2022	2	2:53	Wheatland, California, United States	
Draw	10–9–3	Vinicius Zani	Draw (majority)	Fury FC 52	October 17, 2021	3	5:00	Houston, Texas, United States	
Loss	10–9–2	Levi Mowles	Submission (rear-naked choke)	Fury FC 48	July 25, 2021	1	2:44	Houston, Texas, United States	
Loss	10–8–2	Kazuma Sone	Decision (unanimous)	Shooto 2021 Vol.1	January 31, 2021	3	5:00	Tokyo, Japan	
Loss	10–7–2	Kang Kyung-ho	Technical Submission (rear-naked choke)	UFC 234	February 10, 2019	1	3:59	Melbourne, Australia	
Loss	10–6–2	Petr Yan	KO (punches)	UFC Fight Night: Cowboy vs. Edwards	June 23, 2018	1	3:28	Kallang, Singapore	
Loss	10–5–2	José Alberto Quiñónez	Decision (unanimous)	UFC 221	February 11, 2018	3	5:00	Perth, Australia	Return to Bantamweight.
Win	10–4–2	Rolando Dy	Decision (unanimous)	UFC Fight Night: Saint Preux vs. Okami	September 23, 2017	3	5:00	Saitama, Japan	Dy was deducted one point in round 3 due to repeated groin strikes.
Loss	9–4–2	Gray Maynard	Decision (unanimous)	The Ultimate Fighter: Redemption Finale	July 7, 2017	3	5:00	Las Vegas, Nevada, United States	
Loss	9–3–2	Artem Lobov	Decision (unanimous)	UFC Fight Night: Mousasi vs. Hall 2	November 19, 2016	3	5:00	Belfast, Northern Ireland	
Win	9–2–2	Horacio Gutiérrez	KO (punches)	UFC Fight Night: Rodríguez vs. Caceres	August 6, 2016	1	2:32	Salt Lake City, Utah, United States	Performance of the Night.
Win	8–2–2	Julian Erosa	KO (punches)	UFC 196	March 5, 2016	2	0:34	Las Vegas, Nevada, United States	
Draw	7–2–2	Mizuto Hirota	Draw (split)	UFC Fight Night: Barnett vs. Nelson	September 27, 2015	3	5:00	Saitama, Japan	Return to Featherweight. Road to UFC: Japan Featherweight Tournament Final.
Win	7–2–1	Jo Jung-hwan	TKO (head kick and punches)	VTJ 5th in Osaka	June 28, 2014	2	3:24	Osaka, Japan	
Loss	6–2–1	Ulka Sasaki	Technical Submission (rear-naked choke)	VTJ 4th	February 23, 2014	2	1:46	Tokyo, Japan	Return to Bantamweight.
Win	6–1–1	Koji Mori	TKO (punch)	VTJ 2nd	June 22, 2013	1	2:12	Tokyo, Japan	Featherweight debut.
Draw	5–1–1	Kazuhiro Ito	Technical Draw (unanimous)	Shooto BORDER: Season 4 The 2nd	September 23, 2012	1	4:48	Osaka, Japan	
Win	5–1	Yasuaki Nagamoto	KO (punches)	Shooto: Gig West 14	July 8, 2012	1	0:19	Osaka, Japan	
Win	4–1	Choi Jong-hoon	KO (punches)	Shooto BORDER: Season 4 First	April 1, 2012	1	1:03	Osaka, Japan	
Loss	3–1	Michinori Tanaka	Decision (unanimous)	Shooto: The Rookie Tournament 2011 Final	December 18, 2011	2	5:00	Tokyo, Japan	
Win	3–0	Kenji Yamamoto	KO (punch)	Shooto BORDER: Season 3 Roaring Thunder	September 4, 2011	1	0:16	Osaka, Japan	
Win	2–0	Naritoshi Kakuta	KO (punch)	Shooto: Gig West 13	June 5, 2011	1	4:56	Osaka, Japan	
Win	1–0	Takuya Kodama	Decision (unanimous)	Shooto: Border: Season 3: Spring Thunder	April 3, 2011	2	5:00	Osaka, Japan	Bantamweight debut.

Professional Kickboxing Record
Date	Result	Opponent	Event	Location	Method	Round	Time
2014-11-30	Loss	(Japan) Kaito	SHOOT BOXING S-cup 65 kg World Tournament 2018	Tokyo, Japan	Decision	4	3:00
Legend: Win Loss Draw/No contest Notes

== See also ==
- List of male mixed martial artists
