= Ben Nguyen =

American mixed martial artist

- Born: Benjamin Nguyễn; August 3, 1988 (age 38); Sioux Falls, South Dakota, U.S.
- Other names: Ben 10
- Height: 5 ft 5 in (1.65 m)
- Weight: 125 lb (57 kg; 8.9 st)
- Division: Flyweight; Bantamweight
- Reach: 65 1/2 in (166 cm)
- Style: Taekwondo, Muay Thai, Judo, Brazilian Jiu-Jitsu
- Fighting out of: Brisbane, Australia
- Rank: 3rd degree black belt in Taekwondo; Black belt in Brazilian Jiu-Jitsu; Green belt in Judo

Kickboxing record
- Total: 5
- Wins: 5
- By knockout: 2
- Losses: 0

Mixed martial arts record
- Total: 27
- Wins: 18
- By knockout: 10
- By submission: 5
- By decision: 3
- Losses: 9
- By knockout: 6
- By submission: 2

Other information
- Notable relatives: Martin Nguyen, brother
- Mixed martial arts record from Sherdog

Benjamin Nguyen (born August 3, 1988), or Nguyễn Ben, is an American mixed martial artist who competed as a flyweight in the Ultimate Fighting Championship (UFC), where he compiled a record of 4–3 with the organization. He is also a former Nitro Bantamweight Champion and K-Oz Bantamweight Champion.

== MMA career ==
=== Early career ===
Nguyen began his professional mixed martial arts career while working during the day as a computer technician. In 2012 he went to Thailand to attend Tiger Muay Thai & MMA Scholar Athlete program. He then moved to Brisbane, Australia fighting from there.

Nguyen made his professional MMA debut in December 2006, losing his first fight. Over the next nearly eight years, he amassed a record of 14 wins against 5 losses and in the process became the Nitro Bantamweight Champion, K-Oz Bantamweight Champion and the number one Bantamweight in Australia in 2015.

Nguyen achieved internet fame when his March 8, 2014 fight versus Julian Wallace surfaced on YouTube. Wallace attempted to intimidate Nguyen at the pre-fight weigh-ins by forcefully putting his fist against Nguyen's chin and trying to put Nguyen off his game. This tactic, however, proved ineffective as Nguyen knocked Wallace out within 25 seconds of the first round. The video of this fight went viral and has amassed over 58 million views on YouTube, and over 100 million views on Facebook and other social network platforms.

=== Ultimate Fighting Championship ===
Nguyen made his promotional debut, facing Alptekin Özkılıç on May 10, 2015, at UFC Fight Night 65. He won the fight via KO in the first round.

Nguyen faced Ryan Benoit on November 15, 2015, at UFC 193. He won the fight via submission in the first round.

Nguyen was expected to face Justin Scoggins on March 20, 2016, at UFC Fight Night 85. However, Scoggins pulled out of the fight in the week leading up to the event citing injury. As a result, Nguyen was pulled from the card entirely.

Nguyen next faced Louis Smolka on July 13, 2016, at UFC Fight Night 91. He lost the fight via TKO in the second round.

Nguyen faced Geane Herrera on November 27, 2016, at UFC Fight Night 101. He won the fight via unanimous decision.

Nguyen was expected to face Joseph Benavidez on June 11, 2017, at UFC Fight Night 110. However, Benavidez pulled out of the fight on May 10 with a knee injury and was replaced by Tim Elliott. He won the fight by submission due to a rear-naked choke in the first round. The win also earned him his first Performance of the Night bonus award.

Nguyen faced Jussier Formiga on February 11, 2018, at UFC 221. He lost the fight via technical submission in the third round due to a rear-naked choke.

Nguyen faced Wilson Reis on December 2, 2018, at UFC Fight Night 142. He lost the fight via unanimous decision and was subsequently released from the promotion.

=== Rizin Fighting Federation ===
On January 31, 2019 Rizin Fighting Federation announced Nguyen had signed for the promotion. He faced Kyoji Horiguchi in a 132-pound catchweight bout on April 21, 2019, at Rizin 15. Nguyen lost the fight via TKO in the first round.

== Personal life ==
Nguyen's hometown is Sioux Falls, South Dakota. Nguyen said that he started Taekwondo when he was twelve years old after he was bullied in school. After high school, he went to college to become an engineer but then he switched paths to follow his dream of becoming an MMA fighter.

Nguyen met his wife, Brisbane kickboxer April Adams, while training in Thailand, eventually following her to make Brisbane his home. They married in late 2015. In a 2015 video, Nguyen said that he owns two cats which were both about a year old. Nguyen said that he likes cars and motorcycles.

== Championships and accomplishments ==
- Ultimate Fighting Championship
  - Performance of the Night (One time) vs. Tim Elliott
  - UFC.com Awards
    - 2015: Ranked #10 Newcomer of the Year
- Nitro MMA
  - Nitro MMA Bantamweight Champion (One Time)
  - One successful title defense

== Mixed martial arts record ==
Professional record breakdown
27 matches	18 wins	9 losses
By knockout	10	6
By submission	5	2
By decision	3	1

Res.	Record	Opponent	Method	Event	Date	Round	Time	Location	Notes
Loss	18–9	Kyoji Horiguchi	KO (punches)	Rizin 15	April 21, 2019	1	2:53	Yokohama, Japan	Catchweight (60 kg) bout.
Loss	18–8	Wilson Reis	Decision (unanimous)	UFC Fight Night: dos Santos vs. Tuivasa	December 2, 2018	3	5:00	Adelaide, Australia	
Loss	18–7	Jussier Formiga	Technical Submission (rear-naked choke)	UFC 221	February 11, 2018	3	1:43	Perth, Australia	
Win	18–6	Tim Elliott	Submission (rear-naked choke)	UFC Fight Night: Lewis vs. Hunt	June 11, 2017	1	0:49	Auckland, New Zealand	Performance of the Night.
Win	17–6	Geane Herrera	Decision (unanimous)	UFC Fight Night: Whittaker vs. Brunson	November 27, 2016	3	5:00	Melbourne, Australia	
Loss	16–6	Louis Smolka	TKO (punches and elbows)	UFC Fight Night: McDonald vs. Lineker	July 13, 2016	2	4:41	Sioux Falls, South Dakota, United States	
Win	16–5	Ryan Benoit	Submission (rear-naked choke)	UFC 193	November 15, 2015	1	2:35	Melbourne, Australia	
Win	15–5	Alp Ozkilic	TKO (punches)	UFC Fight Night: Miocic vs. Hunt	May 10, 2015	1	4:59	Adelaide, Australia	Flyweight debut.
Win	14–5	Reece McLaren	Decision (unanimous)	Nitro MMA 12	October 11, 2014	5	5:00	Logan City, Australia	Defended the Nitro MMA Bantamweight Championship.
Win	13–5	Julian Wallace	KO (punch)	Nitro MMA 11	March 8, 2014	1	0:25	Logan City, Australia	Won the Nitro MMA Bantamweight Championship.
Win	12–5	Shantaram Maharaj	Submission (rear-naked choke)	K-Oz Entertainment – Bragging Rights 6: Night of Titles	July 27, 2013	3	3:58	Madeley, Australia	
Win	11–5	Luke Morris	Decision (unanimous)	K.O. Martial Arts: Adrenalin-Unleashed	June 29, 2013	3	5:00	Eatons Hill, Australia	
Win	10–5	Kian Pham	TKO (punches)	Australia Regional	April 27, 2013	2	2:48	Brisbane, Australia	
Win	9–5	Greg Penaloza	TKO (doctor stoppage)	Roshambo MMA 1: In the Cage	April 6, 2013	2	5:00	Brisbane, Australia	
Win	8–5	Andrew Whitney	Submission (armbar)	The Cage Inc.: Battle at the Border 9	April 23, 2011	1	3:48	Hankinson, North Dakota, United States	
Loss	7–5	Chavalit Sityodtong	TKO (punches)	Martial Combat 7	August 18, 2010	2	N/A	Sentosa, Singapore	
Win	7–4	Laramie Shaffer	TKO (doctor stoppage)	OFC: Battle at Huset's Speedway	July 31, 2010	1	5:00	Brandon, South Dakota, United States	
Loss	6–4	Josh Phillips	TKO (punches)	The Cage Inc.: Battle at the Border 5	May 15, 2010	4	3:51	Hankinson, North Dakota, United States	
Loss	6–3	Eric Perez	TKO (punches)	Canadian Fighting Championship 3	November 13, 2009	2	4:20	Winnipeg, Manitoba, Canada	
Loss	6–2	Alexis Vila	KO (punch)	PFC: Best of Both Worlds	February 6, 2009	2	0:34	Lemoore, California, United States	
Win	6–1	Danny Schroder	TKO (corner stoppage)	TCI: Fight Hunger	October 17, 2008	2	2:07	Sioux Falls, South Dakota, United States	
Win	5–1	Nate Hansen	Submission (triangle choke)	The Cage Inc.: Summer Slam 4	June 14, 2008	1	1:30	Sioux Falls, South Dakota, United States	
Win	4–1	Nick Holbrook	KO (punches)	Fury Fights: Battle in Brookings 3	April 21, 2007	2	2:36	Brookings, South Dakota, United States	
Win	3–1	Mitch Wisner	TKO (punches)	Fury Fights: Temple Fight Night 2	March 10, 2007	1	2:00	Brookings, South Dakota, United States	
Win	2–1	Chuck Page	KO (elbows)	Fury Fights: Temple Fight Night 1	March 1, 2007	1	3:12	Brookings, South Dakota, United States	
Win	1–1	Jess Fuhriman	KO (punches)	Fury Fights: Battle in Brookings 2	February 24, 2007	1	0:34	Brookings, South Dakota, United States	
Loss	0–1	Austin Peterson	Submission (rear-naked choke)	Fury Fights: Battle in Brookings 1	December 2, 2006	2	0:58	Brookings, South Dakota, United States	
