= UFC 221 =

UFC mixed martial arts event in 2018

UFC 221: Romero vs. Rockhold
- The poster for UFC 221: Romero vs. Rockhold
- Promotion: Ultimate Fighting Championship
- Date: 11 February 2018
- Venue: Perth Arena
- City: Perth, Australia
- Attendance: 12,437
- Total gate: $2,810,520
- Buyrate: 130,000

Event chronology
UFC Fight Night: Machida vs. Anders	UFC 221: Romero vs. Rockhold	UFC Fight Night: Cowboy vs. Medeiros

UFC 221: Romero vs. Rockhold was a mixed martial arts event produced by the Ultimate Fighting Championship that was held on 11 February 2018, at Perth Arena in Perth, Australia.

== Background ==
While the UFC has hosted 11 previous events across the country, the event marked the promotion's first visit to Perth, in Western Australia, after the state government overturned its ban on cage fighting.

In order for the event to be broadcast live during prime time hours on the east coast of North America, the main card began at 11:00 a.m. local time in Perth WST, with a full preliminary card beginning at approximately 7:00 a.m. local time.

While not officially announced by the promotion, a UFC Middleweight Championship unification bout between then champion Georges St-Pierre (who is also a former two time UFC Welterweight Champion) and interim champion Robert Whittaker (also The Ultimate Fighter: The Smashes welterweight winner), was initially targeted to serve as the event headliner. However, St-Pierre later indicated that he was currently mulling his future in the division and announced that he expected to be out indefinitely after being diagnosed with ulcerative colitis. Subsequently, St-Pierre vacated the championship on 7 December and Whittaker was promoted to undisputed champion. Whittaker was then expected to defend the championship against former Strikeforce and UFC Middleweight Champion Luke Rockhold in the main event. However, it was announced on 13 January that Whittaker pulled out of the bout and was replaced by former middleweight interim title challenger Yoel Romero, who was scheduled to face former WSOF Middleweight and Light Heavyweight Champion David Branch at UFC on Fox: Emmett vs. Stephens. The bout was also established as an interim title contest.

A lightweight bout between Jeremy Kennedy and Alexander Volkanovski was originally scheduled for UFC Fight Night: Werdum vs. Tybura. However, Kennedy pulled out due to a back injury. The pairing was later rescheduled for this event.

At the weigh-ins, Romero came in at 187.7 lb (after coming in at 188.3 lb in his first attempt), 2.7 pounds over the middleweight limit of 185 lb for a championship fight. As a result, in the event that Romero won the fight with Rockhold, he would be ineligible for the championship, while the latter was still eligible. Romero was fined 30% of his purse, which went to Rockhold and the bout proceeded as scheduled at a catchweight.

== Results ==
Main Card
Weight class				Method	Round	Time	Notes
Catchweight (187.7 lb)	Yoel Romero	def.	Luke Rockhold	KO (punches)	3	1:48	(Note: For the interim UFC Middleweight Championship (only Rockhold was eligible to win the title due to Romero missing weight).)
Heavyweight	Curtis Blaydes	def.	Mark Hunt	Decision (unanimous) (30–26, 30–26, 29–27)	3	5:00
Heavyweight	Tai Tuivasa	def.	Cyril Asker	TKO (punches and elbows)	1	2:18
Welterweight	Jake Matthews	def.	Li Jingliang	Decision (unanimous) (29–28, 30–26, 30–26)	3	5:00
Light Heavyweight	Tyson Pedro	def.	Saparbek Safarov	Submission (kimura)	1	3:54
Preliminary Card (Fox Sports 1)
Lightweight	Dong Hyun Ma	def.	Damien Brown	Decision (split) (29–28, 28–29, 29–28)	3	5:00
Middleweight	Israel Adesanya	def.	Rob Wilkinson	TKO (knees and punches)	2	3:37
Featherweight	Alexander Volkanovski	def.	Jeremy Kennedy	TKO (punches and elbows)	2	4:57
Flyweight	Jussier Formiga	def.	Ben Nguyen	Technical Submission (rear-naked choke)	3	1:43
Preliminary Card (UFC Fight Pass)
Lightweight	Ross Pearson	def.	Mizuto Hirota	Decision (unanimous) (30–27, 30–27, 29–28)	3	5:00
Bantamweight	José Alberto Quiñónez	def.	Teruto Ishihara	Decision (unanimous) (30–27, 29–28, 29–28)	3	5:00
Welterweight	Luke Jumeau	def.	Daichi Abe	Decision (unanimous) (29–28, 29–27, 28–27)	3	5:00

== Bonus awards ==
The following fighters were awarded $50,000 bonuses:

- Fight of the Night: Jake Matthews vs. Li Jingliang
- Performance of the Night: Israel Adesanya and Jussier Formiga

== See also ==
- 2018 in UFC
- List of UFC events
- Mixed martial arts in Australia
