= Keita Nakamura =

Japanese mixed martial arts fighter

Keitaro Nakamura 中村K太郎
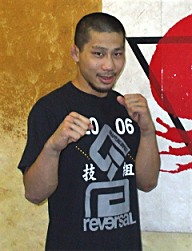
- Born: 22 May 1984 (age 42); Tokyo, Japan
- Other names: K-Taro
- Height: 5 ft 11 in (1.80 m)
- Weight: 169 lb (77 kg; 12.1 st)
- Division: Welterweight; Lightweight
- Stance: Southpaw
- Fighting out of: Tokyo, Japan
- Team: United Gym Tokyo
- Years active: 2003–present

Mixed martial arts record
- Total: 51
- Wins: 36
- By knockout: 9
- By submission: 16
- By decision: 11
- Losses: 12
- By knockout: 2
- By submission: 1
- By decision: 9
- Draws: 2
- No contests: 1

Other information
- Mixed martial arts record from Sherdog

Keitaro Nakamura (Japanese: 中村 K太郎, Nakamura Keitarō; born May 22, 1984) is a Japanese professional mixed martial artist and grappler currently competing in the Welterweight division of RIZIN. A professional competitor since 2003, he has formerly competed for the UFC, World Victory Road, Pancrase, Shooto, DREAM, Vale Tudo Japan, and DEEP. He is the former Sengoku Welterweight Champion, Shooto Pacific Rim Middleweight Champion, and also won the World Victory Road Welterweight Grand Prix Tournament in 2010.

In submission grappling, Nakamura took part in both the 2009 and 2011 ADCC Submission Wrestling World Championship, making it to the second round and winning via points in both.

== Mixed martial arts career ==
=== Early career ===
Nakamura made his professional MMA debut in his native Japan in October 2003. Over nearly three years, he amassed a record of 15-0-2 with wins over Yoshiyuki Yoshida, Ronald Jhun, and Daisuke Nakamura.

=== Ultimate Fighting Championship ===
Nakamura made his UFC debut in December 2006 against Brock Larson at UFC 81. He lost the fight via unanimous decision, ending his undefeated streak.

For his second fight with the promotion, Nakamura faced Drew Fickett at UFC Fight Night: Stevenson vs. Guillard in April 2007. He again lost the fight via unanimous decision.

Nakamura lost by contentious split decision to Rob Emerson at UFC 81 on February 2, 2008 at the Mandalay Bay Events Center in Las Vegas, Nevada. Nakamura dropped Emerson with a big knee at the end of the first round after Emerson had outstruck him for much of the round up until that point. Emerson came back strong in the second round landing crisp combinations that left Nakamura's face a mess at the end of the round. Nakamura scored takedowns in the third round on a visibly tiring Emerson while also landing some strong knees but it was not enough to win the decision as the scores read 30–27, 28-29 and 30–27 in favor of Emerson. Following this loss, Nakamura was released from the UFC.

After the fight, the 24-year-old Nakamura announced his retirement from MMA. Disappointed by his three UFC defeats, "K-Taro" also suffered from vision issues following the Emerson bout, due his opponent's toe impairing his vision after a high kick attempt.

=== Return to Japan ===
Despite his claim that he would become a police officer, Nakamura's retirement lasted a mere few months. He returned in September 2008 as he faced Adriano Martins in for the DREAM promotion. He won the fight via unanimous decision.

Nakamura suffered a devastating loss to heavy underdog Korean fighter, Jang Yong Kim in his second post-retirement comeback fight. Since then, he has seen a resurgence, going 13-2-1 over the next few years, including winning the Sengoku Welterweight Grand Prix with a submission victory over Yasubey Enomoto.

=== UFC return ===
Nakamura returned to the UFC in September 2015. He faced Li Jingliang on September 27, 2015 at UFC Fight Night 75. After being bloodied by his opponent over two rounds, Nakamura rallied back to win the fight via submission in the third round. The win also earned Nakamura his first Performance of the Night bonus award.

Nakamura faced Tom Breese on February 27, 2016 at UFC Fight Night 84. He lost the fight via unanimous decision.

Nakamura faced Kyle Noke on July 13, 2016 at UFC Fight Night 91. He won the fight via submission in final seconds of the second round.

Nakamura next faced Elizeu Zaleski dos Santos on October 1, 2016 at UFC Fight Night 96. He lost the fight via unanimous decision.

Nakamura faced Alex Morono at UFC Fight Night: Saint Preux vs. Okami on September 23, 2017. He won the fight by split decision (29-28, 28–29, 29-28).

Nakamura faced Tony Martin on April 21, 2018 at UFC Fight Night 128. He lost the fight by unanimous decision.

Nakamura faced Salim Touahri on December 2, 2018 at UFC Fight Night 142. He won the fight via split decision.

Nakamura faced Sultan Aliev on April 20, 2019 at UFC Fight Night 149. He lost the fight via unanimous decision.

In September 2019, it was reported that Nakamura was released by UFC.

=== Post-UFC career ===
After the release from the UFC, Nakamura signed with RIZIN. After winning his promotional debut via TKO, he next faced Lorenz Larkin at Bellator & RIZIN: Japan on December 29, 2019. He lost the fight by unanimous decision.

On April 1, 2023 at Rizin 41 – Osaka, Nakamura defeated Kiichi Kunimoto via second round TKO stoppage after dropping Kunimoto and finishing him with a soccer kick.

Nakamura fought Roberto Satoshi de Souza in a non-title bout in the main event of RIZIN Landmark 9 on March 23, 2024. He lost the fight by corner stoppage in the first round after getting dropped by head kick.

== Championships and accomplishments ==
- Shooto
  - Shooto Pacific Rim Middleweight (167 lb) Championship (One time)
- Sengoku Raiden Championship
  - SRC Welterweight Championship (One time)
  - 2010 Sengoku Welterweight Grand Prix Winner
- Deep
  - DEEP Welterweight Championship (One time)
- Ultimate Fighting Championship
  - Performance of the Night (One time) vs. Li Jingliang
  - UFC.com Awards
    - 2015: Ranked #8 Submission of the Year vs. Li Jingliang
    - 2016: Ranked #6 Submission of the Year vs. Kyle Noke

== Mixed martial arts record ==
Professional record breakdown
51 matches	36 wins	12 losses
By knockout	9	2
By submission	16	1
By decision	11	9
Draws	2	
No contests	1	

Res.	Record	Opponent	Method	Event	Date	Round	Time	Location	Notes
Loss	36–12–2 (1)	Roberto de Souza	TKO (corner stoppage)	Rizin Landmark 9	March 23, 2024	1	1:43	Kobe, Japan	Non-Title bout.
Win	36–11–2 (1)	Kiichi Kunimoto	KO (punches and soccer kick)	Rizin 41	April 1, 2023	2	0:49	Osaka, Japan	
Loss	35–11–2 (1)	Lorenz Larkin	Decision (unanimous)	Bellator & Rizin: Japan	December 29, 2019	3	5:00	Saitama, Japan	Catchweight (173.5 lbs) bout; Larkin missed weight.
Win	35–10–2 (1)	Marcos Yoshio de Souza	TKO (punches)	Rizin 19	October 12, 2019	1	1:18	Osaka, Japan	
Loss	34–10–2 (1)	Sultan Aliev	Decision (unanimous)	UFC Fight Night: Overeem vs. Oleinik	April 20, 2019	3	5:00	Saint Petersburg, Russia	
Win	34–9–2 (1)	Salim Touahri	Decision (split)	UFC Fight Night: dos Santos vs. Tuivasa	December 2, 2018	3	5:00	Adelaide, Australia	
Loss	33–9–2 (1)	Anthony Rocco Martin	Decision (unanimous)	UFC Fight Night: Barboza vs. Lee	April 21, 2018	3	5:00	Atlantic City, New Jersey, United States	
Win	33–8–2 (1)	Alex Morono	Decision (split)	UFC Fight Night: Saint Preux vs. Okami	September 23, 2017	3	5:00	Saitama, Japan	
Loss	32–8–2 (1)	Elizeu Zaleski dos Santos	Decision (unanimous)	UFC Fight Night: Lineker vs. Dodson	October 1, 2016	3	5:00	Portland, Oregon, United States	
Win	32–7–2 (1)	Kyle Noke	Submission (rear-naked choke)	UFC Fight Night: McDonald vs. Lineker	July 13, 2016	2	4:59	Sioux Falls, South Dakota, United States	
Loss	31–7–2 (1)	Tom Breese	Decision (unanimous)	UFC Fight Night: Silva vs. Bisping	February 27, 2016	3	5:00	London, England	
Win	31–6–2 (1)	Li Jingliang	Technical Submission (rear-naked choke)	UFC Fight Night: Barnett vs. Nelson	September 27, 2015	3	2:17	Saitama, Japan	Performance of the Night.
Win	30–6–2 (1)	Yuta Watanabe	Submission (rear-naked choke)	DEEP: Cage Impact 2015	July 20, 2015	1	2:00	Tokyo, Japan	Won the DEEP Welterweight Championship.
Win	29–6–2 (1)	Yoshiyuki Katahira	Submission (rear-naked choke)	DEEP: 71 Impact	February 28, 2015	1	3:47	Tokyo, Japan	
Win	28–6–2 (1)	Yuki Okano	TKO (punches)	DEEP: 69 Impact	October 26, 2014	2	0:26	Tokyo, Japan	
Win	27–6–2 (1)	Keiichiro Yamamiya	TKO (punches)	DEEP: 67 Impact	June 22, 2014	1	4:13	Tokyo, Japan	Return to Welterweight.
Loss	26–6–2 (1)	Frank Camacho	Decision (unanimous)	PXC: Pacific Xtreme Combat 42	February 28, 2014	3	5:00	Mangilao, Guam	
NC	26–5–2 (1)	Kwang Hee Lee	NC (Nakamura missed weight)	DEEP: 64th Impact	December 22, 2013	N/A	N/A	Tokyo, Japan	
Win	26–5–2	Kota Shimoishi	Submission (rear-naked choke)	Shooto: 3rd Round	July 27, 2013	2	0:37	Tokyo, Japan	Return to Lightweight.
Win	25–5–2	Nobutatsu Suzuki	Submission (rear-naked choke)	Vale Tudo Japan 2012	December 24, 2012	1	2:09	Tokyo, Japan	Catchweight (80 kg) bout.
Win	24–5–2	Yuki Sasaki	Decision (unanimous)	Shooto: 5th Round	May 18, 2012	3	5:00	Tokyo, Japan	
Win	23–5–2	Hoon Kim	TKO (broken hand)	LFC: Legend Fighting Championship 8	March 30, 2012	1	5:00	Chek Lap Kok, China	
Win	22–5–2	Yoichiro Sato	Decision (majority)	Shooto: Survivor Tournament Final	January 8, 2012	3	5:00	Tokyo, Japan	
Loss	21–5–2	Akihiro Murayama	Submission (rear-naked choke)	Shooto: Shootor's Legacy 4	September 23, 2011	1	2:30	Tokyo, Japan	
Win	21–4–2	Yasubey Enomoto	Submission (rear-naked choke)	World Victory Road Presents: Soul of Fight	December 30, 2010	2	3:48	Tokyo, Japan	SRC Welterweight Grand Prix Final. Won the SRC Welterweight Championship.
Win	20–4–2	Takuya Wada	Submission (punches)	World Victory Road Presents: Sengoku Raiden Championships 15	October 30, 2010	1	3:30	Tokyo, Japan	SRC Welterweight Grand Prix Semifinal.
Win	19–4–2	Omar de la Cruz	TKO (punches)	World Victory Road Presents: Sengoku Raiden Championships 13	June 20, 2010	2	3:53	Tokyo, Japan	SRC Welterweight Grand Prix Quarterfinal.
Win	18–4–2	Tomoyoshi Iwamiya	Decision (majority)	GCM: Cage Force 11	June 27, 2009	3	5:00	Tokyo, Japan	Return to Welterweight.
Loss	17–4–2	Jang Yong Kim	TKO (punches)	GCM: Cage Force EX Eastern Bound	November 8, 2008	1	0:59	Tokyo, Japan	
Win	17–3–2	Adriano Martins	Decision (split)	Dream 6: Middleweight Grand Prix 2008 Final Round	September 23, 2008	2	5:00	Saitama, Japan	
Loss	16–3–2	Rob Emerson	Decision (split)	UFC 81	February 2, 2008	3	5:00	Las Vegas, Nevada, United States	Lightweight debut.
Win	16–2–2	Takefumi Hanai	TKO (knees)	GCM: Cage Force EX Eastern Bound	November 11, 2007	1	1:59	Tokyo, Japan	
Loss	15–2–2	Drew Fickett	Decision (unanimous)	UFC Fight Night: Stevenson vs. Guillard	April 5, 2007	3	5:00	Las Vegas, Nevada, United States	
Loss	15–1–2	Brock Larson	Decision (unanimous)	UFC Fight Night: Sanchez vs. Riggs	December 13, 2006	3	5:00	San Diego, California, United States	
Win	15–0–2	Djalili Salmanov	Submission (rear-naked choke)	GCM: D.O.G. 7	September 9, 2006	1	3:50	Tokyo, Japan	
Win	14–0–2	Ronald Jhun	Technical Submission (rear-naked choke)	PIP: East vs. West	July 21, 2006	1	3:55	Honolulu, Hawaii, United States	Won the Shooto Pacific Rim Middleweight (167 lbs) Championship.
Win	13–0–2	Jun Yong Jae	Submission (rear-naked choke)	MARS World Grand Prix	April 29, 2006	1	1:58	Seoul, South Korea	
Win	12–0–2	Yoshiyuki Yoshida	Technical Decision (majority)	Shooto: 12/17 in Shinjuku Face	December 17, 2005	2	4:06	Tokyo, Japan	
Win	11–0–2	Katsuaki Niioka	Submission (rear-naked choke)	Shooto 2005: 11/6 in Korakuen Hall	November 6, 2005	1	2:10	Tokyo, Japan	
Win	10–0–2	Mohamed Khacha	Submission (rear-naked choke)	GCM: D.O.G. 3	September 17, 2005	1	3:34	Tokyo, Japan	
Win	9–0–2	Taro Minato	Submission (rear-naked choke)	GCM: Demolition 22	August 28, 2005	1	4:03	Tokyo, Japan	
Win	8–0–2	Jun Kitagawa	Decision (unanimous)	Shooto: 6/3 in Kitazawa Town Hall	June 3, 2005	2	5:00	Tokyo, Japan	
Win	7–0–2	Kentaro Maeda	Decision (unanimous)	Shooto: 2/6 in Kitazawa Town Hall	February 6, 2005	2	5:00	Tokyo, Japan	
Win	6–0–2	Atsushi Inoue	Submission (rear-naked choke)	GCM: Demolition 20	November 14, 2004	1	2:11	Tokyo, Japan	
Draw	5–0–2	Kazunori Yokata	Draw	GCM: Demolition 18	September 19, 2004	2	5:00	Tokyo, Japan	
Win	5–0–1	Keisuke Sakai	Submission (rear-naked choke)	Shooto: 7/16 in Korakuen Hall	July 16, 2004	1	2:20	Tokyo, Japan	
Win	4–0–1	Ichiro Kanai	Decision (unanimous)	GCM: Demolition 15	May 21, 2004	2	5:00	Tokyo, Japan	
Win	3–0–1	Daisuke Nakamura	Decision (unanimous)	GCM: Demolition 14	April 8, 2004	2	5:00	Tokyo, Japan	
Draw	2–0–1	Ichiro Kanai	Draw	GCM: Demolition 12	December 27, 2003	2	5:00	Tokyo, Japan	
Win	2–0	Kenta Omori	Submission (triangle choke)	Kingdom Ehrgeiz: Tokyo University Flight	December 13, 2003	1	7:44	Tokyo, Japan	
Win	1–0	Tomohito Tanizaki	TKO (punches)	Kingdom Ehrgeiz: Tomorrow	October 12, 2003	1	0:33	Tokyo, Japan	
