= UFC Fight Night: Lewis vs. Hunt =

UFC mixed martial arts event in 2017

- The poster for UFC Fight Night: Lewis vs. Hunt
- Promotion: Ultimate Fighting Championship
- Date: 11 June 2017
- Venue: Spark Arena
- City: Auckland, New Zealand
- Attendance: 8,649
- Total gate: $1,150,428 NZD

Event chronology
UFC 212: Aldo vs. Holloway	UFC Fight Night: Lewis vs. Hunt	UFC Fight Night: Holm vs. Correia

UFC Fight Night: Lewis vs. Hunt (also known as UFC Fight Night 110) was a mixed martial arts event produced by the Ultimate Fighting Championship held on 11 June 2017 at the Spark Arena in Auckland, New Zealand.

== Background ==
The event was the second that the promotion has hosted in Auckland, following UFC Fight Night: Te Huna vs. Marquardt in June 2014.

A heavyweight bout between Derrick Lewis and the 2001 K-1 World Grand Prix winner and former interim title contender Mark Hunt served as the main event.

Former UFC Flyweight Championship challenger Joseph Benavidez was expected to face Ben Nguyen at the event. However, Benavidez pulled out of the fight citing a knee injury on 10 May. He was replaced by The Ultimate Fighter: Tournament of Champions flyweight winner and fellow former title challenger Tim Elliott.

The Ultimate Fighter: Brazil 3 middleweight winner Warlley Alves was expected to face Kiichi Kunimoto, but pulled out on May 18 due to an undisclosed injury and was replaced by Zak Ottow.

Promotional newcomer Nadia Kassem was scheduled to face JJ Aldrich, but pulled out on May 31 and was replaced by fellow newcomer Chan-Mi Jeon.

At the weigh-ins, Jeon came in at 118 lb, two pounds over the women's strawweight limit of 116 lb. As a result, she was fined 20% of the purse, which went to Aldrich and the bout proceeded as scheduled at a catchweight.

Just hours before the event, Thibault Gouti pulled out of a scheduled lightweight bout against Dong Hyun Ma due to illness, prompting Kim's removal as well.

== Results ==
Main Card (Fox Sports 1)
Weight class				Method	Round	Time	Notes
Heavyweight	Mark Hunt	def.	Derrick Lewis	TKO (punches)	4	3:51
Middleweight	Derek Brunson	def.	Dan Kelly	KO (punches)	1	1:16
Lightweight	Dan Hooker	def.	Ross Pearson	KO (knee)	2	3:02
Light Heavyweight	Ion Cuțelaba	def.	Henrique da Silva	KO (punches)	1	0:22
Flyweight	Ben Nguyen	def.	Tim Elliott	Submission (rear-naked choke)	1	0:49
Featherweight	Alexander Volkanovski	def.	Mizuto Hirota	Decision (unanimous) (30–27, 30–27, 30–27)	3	5:00
Preliminary Card (Fox Sports 1)
Lightweight	Vinc Pichel	def.	Damien Brown	KO (punches)	1	3:37
Welterweight	Luke Jumeau	def.	Dominique Steele	Decision (unanimous) (29–28, 29–28, 29–28)	3	5:00
Flyweight	John Moraga	def.	Ashkan Mokhtarian	Decision (unanimous) (30–25, 30–27, 30–27)	3	5:00
Welterweight	Zak Ottow	def.	Kiichi Kunimoto	Decision (split) (29–28, 28–29, 29–28)	3	5:00
Preliminary Card (UFC Fight Pass)
Catchweight (118 lb)	JJ Aldrich	def.	Chan-Mi Jeon	Decision (unanimous) (30–27, 30–27, 30–27)	3	5:00

== Bonus awards ==
The following fighters were awarded $50,000 bonuses:

- Fight of the Night: Mark Hunt vs. Derrick Lewis
- Performance of the Night: Dan Hooker and Ben Nguyen

== See also ==
- List of UFC events
- 2017 in UFC
