= Luke Jumeau =

New Zealander MMA fighter

- Born: 12 February 1988 (age 38); Hamilton, New Zealand
- Other names: The Jedi; Juggernaut
- Nationality: New Zealander
- Height: 180 cm (5 ft 11 in)
- Weight: 77 kg (170 lb; 12 st 2 lb)
- Division: Lightweight; Welterweight
- Reach: 72.0 in (183 cm)
- Style: Kickboxing, BJJ, Tae Kwon Do
- Fighting out of: Hamilton, New Zealand
- Team: Phuket Top Team; Core MMA, Hamilton; City Kickboxing
- Rank: 1st degree black belt in Taekwondo; Purple belt in Brazilian Jiu-Jitsu
- Years active: 2008–present

Mixed martial arts record
- Total: 18
- Wins: 13
- By knockout: 5
- By submission: 4
- By decision: 4
- Losses: 5
- By submission: 2
- By decision: 3

Other information
- Mixed martial arts record from Sherdog

Luke Jumeau (born 12 February 1988) is a New Zealand mixed martial artist, and he competed in the Welterweight division of the Ultimate Fighting Championship (UFC).

== Background ==
Jumeau was born in Hamilton, New Zealand. Raised by a single mother, his early childhood was a struggle and he got himself into trouble. He changed his life after losing his brother in a tragic accident, channeling his energy in pursuing "a life worthy of both of us" in MMA.

To get into fighting comes easily with Luke as he believes "the warrior spirit lies within all New Zealanders". He works as a panel beater.

Jumeau's fighting style began with boxing, a sport he pursued for several years before switching to mixed martial arts. He put 10 years into achieving his tae kwon do-based black belt.

== Mixed martial arts career ==
=== Early career ===
Jumeau started his MMA career in 2008. He has fought international in New Zealand, Hong Kong, Australia, and Dubai in various promotions. "The Jedi" last fight before made it into UFC was at Legend MMA 1, competing against former UFC fighter, Vic Grujic, winning with TKO. He held a 6 winning streak – all stoppages, prior signed by Ultimate Fighting Championship.

=== Ultimate Fighting Championship ===
Jumeau made his promotion debut on 10 June 2017 at UFC Fight Night: Lewis vs. Hunt against Dominique Steele, in his home country New Zealand.

Steele closely won the first round however, Jumeau was able to come back – nearly knocking out Steele in the second round, and dominating the third. He won the fight with unanimous decision (29–28, 29–28,29–28).

Jumeau faced Shinsho Anzai on 23 September 2017 at UFC Fight Night 117. He lost the fight by unanimous decision with the score board of (29–28, 29–28, 30–27).

Jumeau faced Daichi Abe on his third fight on 11 February 2018 at UFC 221. He won the fight via unanimous decision.

Jumeau was scheduled to face Geoff Neal on 2 December 2018 at UFC Fight Night 142. However, it was reported on early November, 2018 that Jumeau pulled from the card due to injury.

Jumeau faced Dhiego Lima on 6 October 2019 at UFC 243. He lost the fight via split decision.

Jumeau was released by the UFC on February 11, 2020.

== Personal life ==
Luke prefers to use the moniker "Juggernaut" instead of "The Jedi" as he has heavy hands and is naturally strong. "The Jedi" was done by a local New Zealand promoter due to his calm and collective demeanour in the cage where a Star Wars theme video was made for him on the promotion.

== Mixed martial arts record ==
Professional record breakdown
18 matches	13 wins	5 losses
By knockout	5	0
By submission	4	2
By decision	4	3

Res.	Record	Opponent	Method	Event	Date	Round	Time	Location	Notes
Loss	13–5	Dhiego Lima	Decision (split)	UFC 243	6 October 2019	3	5:00	Melbourne, Australia	
Win	13–4	Daichi Abe	Decision (unanimous)	UFC 221	11 February 2018	3	5:00	Perth, Australia	
Loss	12–4	Shinsho Anzai	Decision (unanimous)	UFC Fight Night: Saint Preux vs. Okami	23 September 2017	3	5:00	Saitama, Japan	
Win	12–3	Dominique Steele	Decision (unanimous)	UFC Fight Night: Lewis vs. Hunt	10 June 2017	3	5:00	Auckland, New Zealand	
Win	11–3	Vik Grujic	TKO (punches)	Sledgehammer Promotions: Legend MMA 1	28 January 2017	2	1:32	Gold Coast, Australia	
Win	10–3	Askar Mozharov	Submission (guillotine choke)	Rebel FC 4	25 June 2016	1	1:47	Qingdao, China	
Win	9–3	Damien Fraser	TKO (elbows)	Xtreme Fighting Championship 26	20 February 2016	1	2:40	Brisbane, Australia	
Win	8–3	Yasuaki Miura	TKO (punches)	PRO FC 10	9 May 2015	1	1:36	Taipei, Taiwan	
Win	7–3	Mohammad Mansouri Davar	Submission (rear-naked choke)	Global Fighting Championship 4	16 October 2014	2	2:07	Dubai, United Arab Emirates	
Win	6–3	Hossein Mollamahdi	KO (punch)	Global Fighting Championship 3	29 May 2014	1	N/A	Dubai, United Arab Emirates	
Loss	5–3	Jake Matthews	Submission (rear-naked choke	Australian Fighting Championship 59	10 May 2013	2	1:14	Melbourne, Australia	AFC Welterweight Tournament Quarterfinal.
Loss	5–2	Li Jingliang	Submission (guillotine choke)	Legend Fighting Championship 11	27 August 2013	3	3:38	Kuala Lumpur, Malaysia	For the Legend FC Welterweight Championship.
Win	5–1	Alex Niu	Decision (unanimous)	Legend Fighting Championship 10	24 August 2012	3	5:00	Hong Kong, SAR, China	
Loss	4–1	Jacques Marsters	N/A	Supremacy Fighting Championship 9	4 March 2012	N/A	N/A	Auckland, New Zealand	
Win	4–0	David Johnson	Decision (split)	Fight Night	25 June 2011	3	5:00	Melbourne, Australia	
Win	3–0	Roman Hunt	Submission (triangle choke)	Supremacy Cage Fighting 7	27 November 2010	2	0:00	Auckland, New Zealand	
Win	2–0	Pete Parata	KO (punch)	ICNZ 10	1 May 2010	2	0:57	Auckland, New Zealand	
Win	1–0	Jamie Toon	Submission (guillotine choke)	Fight Night 3	8 October 2008	2	0:37	Hamilton, New Zealand	

== See also ==
- List of current UFC fighters
- List of male mixed martial artists
