= Jake Matthews (fighter) =

Australian mixed martial artist (born 1994)

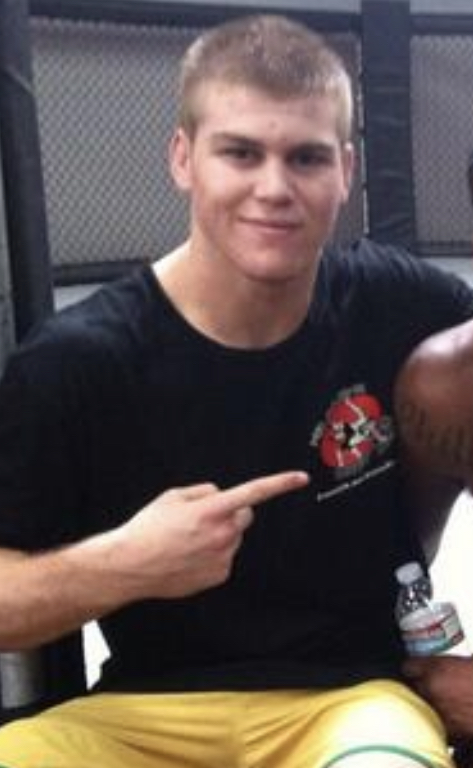
- Matthews in 2017
- Born: 19 August 1994 (age 32); Melbourne, Victoria, Australia
- Other names: The Celtic Kid
- Height: 5 ft 11 in (1.80 m)
- Weight: 170 lb (77 kg; 12 st 2 lb)
- Division: Lightweight (2014–2017); Welterweight (2012–2014, 2017–present)
- Reach: 73 in (185 cm)
- Fighting out of: Epping, Victoria, Australia
- Team: XLR8 Training Centre (2016–present); Resilience Training Centre
- Rank: Black belt in Brazilian Jiu-Jitsu under Carlos "Português" Vieira
- Years active: 2012–present

Mixed martial arts record
- Total: 32
- Wins: 23
- By knockout: 5
- By submission: 9
- By decision: 9
- Losses: 9
- By knockout: 1
- By submission: 4
- By decision: 4

Other information
- Mixed martial arts record from Sherdog

Jake Matthews (born 19 August 1994) is an Australian mixed martial artist currently competing in the Ultimate Fighting Championship's Welterweight division.

== Background ==
Born and raised in Melbourne, Australia, Matthews played Australian football for nine years in his youth, representing the Northern Knights for a season. To keep fit in the offseason, he began training in mixed martial arts out of a shed in the backyard of his parents' house, sparring with his younger brother and being coached by his father.

== Mixed martial arts career ==
=== Early career ===
Matthews made his professional mixed martial arts debut at the age of 18 in September 2012 competing for regional promotions in the Greater Melbourne area where he compiled a record of 7–0 prior to joining the UFC.

=== The Ultimate Fighter: Nations ===
In December 2013, it was announced that Matthews would be a cast member on The Ultimate Fighter Nations: Canada vs. Australia, representing Australia at welterweight. Matthews went on to lose his opening fight in the tournament, dropping a unanimous decision to eventual finalist Olivier Aubin-Mercier and was subsequently eliminated from the show.

=== Ultimate Fighting Championship ===
==== 2014 ====
After winning a fight after his stint on TUF, Matthews made his official UFC debut on 28 June 2014 at UFC Fight Night 43, where he faced promotional newcomer Dashon Johnson in a lightweight bout. Matthews defeated Johnson via submission in the third round.

For his second fight with the promotion, Matthews faced Vagner Rocha on 8 November 2014 at UFC Fight Night 55. Matthews won the fight via second round submission.

==== 2015 ====
Matthews faced James Vick on 10 May 2015 at UFC Fight Night 65. He lost the fight via submission in the first round.

Matthews was expected to face Mickael Lebout on 18 July 2015 at UFC Fight Night 72. However, Matthews pulled out of the fight on 9 July citing injury and was replaced by promotional newcomer Teemu Packalen.

Matthews faced Akbarh Arreola on 15 November 2015 at UFC 193. Matthews won via doctor stoppage between rounds 2 and 3, after scoring a takedown early in the second round and inflicting severe damage to Arreola's right eye with punches and elbows.

==== 2016 ====
Matthews faced Johnny Case on 20 March 2016 at UFC Fight Night 85. He won the bout via submission in the third round. Both participants were awarded Fight of the Night.

Matthews was expected to face Stevie Ray on 8 July 2016 at The Ultimate Fighter 23 Finale. However, Ray pulled out of the fight on 2 June citing alleged visa issues and was replaced by Kevin Lee. Lee won via TKO in the first round.

Matthews next faced Andrew Holbrook on 27 November 2016 at UFC Fight Night 101. He lost the fight via split decision.

==== 2017 ====
Matthews faced Bojan Veličković in a welterweight bout on 19 November 2017 at UFC Fight Night 121. He won the fight via split decision.

==== 2018 ====
Matthews faced Li Jingliang on 11 February 2018 at UFC 221. where he won via unanimous decision. This win earned him the Fight of the Night bonus. Jingliang later faced criticism for eye gouging Matthews whilst trying to escape a submission attempt.

Matthews faced Shinsho Anzai on 23 June 2018 at UFC Fight Night 132. He won the fight via rear-naked choke in the first round.

Matthews faced Anthony Rocco Martin on 2 December 2018 at UFC Fight Night 142. He lost the fight via an anaconda choke in round three.

==== 2019 ====
Matthews faced Rostem Akman on 6 October 2019 at UFC 243. He won the fight via unanimous decision.

==== 2020 ====
Matthews faced Emil Weber Meek on 23 February 2020 at UFC Fight Night 168. He won the fight via unanimous decision.

Matthews faced Diego Sanchez on 27 September 2020 at UFC 253. Matthews won the fight via unanimous decision.

==== 2021 ====
Matthews faced Sean Brady on 6 March 2021 at UFC 259. He lost the fight via an arm triangle choke in round three.

Matthews was scheduled to face Jeremiah Wells on 4 December 2021 at UFC on ESPN 31. However, just hours before the event the bout was cancelled after one of Wells‘s cornermen tested positive for COVID-19.

==== 2022 ====
Matthews faced André Fialho on 11 June 2022, at UFC 275. He won the bout via knockout in the second round. This win earned him the Performance of the Night award.

Matthews faced Matthew Semelsberger on 17 December 2022 at UFC Fight Night 216. He lost the fight via unanimous decision.

==== 2023 ====
Matthews was next expected to face Gabe Green on 13 May 2023 at UFC on ABC 4. However, Matthews withdrew from the bout due to injury and was replaced by Bryan Battle.

Matthews was scheduled to face Miguel Baeza at UFC 291 on 29 July 2023. However on 19 July Baeza pulled out due to an undisclosed reason. He was replaced by promotional newcomer Darrius Flowers. Matthews won the bout via a rear-naked choke submission in the second round.

Matthews faced Michael Morales on 18 November 2023, at UFC Fight Night 232. He lost the fight by unanimous decision.

==== 2024 ====
Matthews faced Philip Rowe on 1 June 2024, at UFC 302. He won the fight by unanimous decision.

==== 2025 ====
Matthews faced Francisco Prado on 9 February 2025, at UFC 312. He won the fight by unanimous decision.

Matthews faced Chidi Njokuani at UFC on ESPN 70 in Nashville, Tennessee on 12 July 2025. He won the fight via a rear-naked choke submission in the first round.

Matthews faced Neil Magny on 28 September 2025 at UFC Fight Night 260. After winning the first two rounds, he lost the fight via a brabo choke in round three.

==== 2026 ====
Matthews was scheduled to face Muslim Salikhov on 30 May 2026 at UFC Fight Night 277. However, Salikhov withdrew for undisclosed reasons and was replaced by Carlston Harris. Matthews won the fight by unanimous decision.

Matthews was initially announced to face promotional newcomer Akbar Abdullaev on 21 November 2026 at UFC Fight Night 294. However, Abdullaev will not compete at the event due to the promotion making a mistake with the matchup. Instead, Matthews faced Tahir Abdullayev instead. At the weigh-ins, Abdullayev weighed in at 172 pounds, one pound over the division's non-title fight limit. The bout proceeded at catchweight and he was fined 20 percent of his purse, which went to Matthews. Matthews lost the fight by unanimous decision.

== Personal life ==
Matthews has a daughter who was born on 5 January 2019. In 2023 it was revealed that Matthews had converted to Islam. He told Code Sports: "I was pretty well aligned with the ethics and morals of Islam for many years, it was a natural progression." "I told my mates this is what I wanted to do, and they didn't realise I was one hundred percent serious, but they didn't know I was on a journey of learning about it for over a year and a half," Matthews added. In the same interview Matthews mentioned he was "in talks with some of Khabib Nurmagomedov's crew about potentially training with him."

== Championships and accomplishments ==
- Ultimate Fighting Championship
  - Fight of the Night (Two times) vs Johnny Case and Li Jingliang
  - Performance of the Night (One time) vs. André Fialho
  - UFC.com Awards
    - 2014: Ranked #2 Newcomer of the Year

== Mixed martial arts record ==
Professional record breakdown
32 matches	23 wins	9 losses
By knockout	5	1
By submission	9	4
By decision	9	4

Res.	Record	Opponent	Method	Event	Date	Round	Time	Location	Notes
Loss	23–9	Tahir Abdullayev	Decision (unanimous)	UFC Fight Night: Procházka vs. Stirling	21 November 2026	3	5:00	Al Rayyan, Qatar	Catchweight (172 lb) bout; Abdullayev missed weight.
Win	23–8	Carlston Harris	Decision (unanimous)	UFC Fight Night: Song vs. Figueiredo	30 May 2026	3	5:00	Macau SAR, China	
Loss	22–8	Neil Magny	Submission (brabo choke)	UFC Fight Night: Ulberg vs. Reyes	28 September 2025	3	3:08	Perth, Australia	
Win	22–7	Chidi Njokuani	Submission (rear-naked choke)	UFC on ESPN: Lewis vs. Teixeira	12 July 2025	1	1:09	Nashville, Tennessee, United States	
Win	21–7	Francisco Prado	Decision (unanimous)	UFC 312	9 February 2025	3	5:00	Sydney, Australia	
Win	20–7	Philip Rowe	Decision (unanimous)	UFC 302	1 June 2024	3	5:00	Newark, New Jersey, United States	
Loss	19–7	Michael Morales	Decision (unanimous)	UFC Fight Night: Allen vs. Craig	18 November 2023	3	5:00	Las Vegas, Nevada, United States	
Win	19–6	Darrius Flowers	Submission (rear-naked choke)	UFC 291	29 July 2023	2	2:37	Salt Lake City, Utah, United States	
Loss	18–6	Matthew Semelsberger	Decision (unanimous)	UFC Fight Night: Cannonier vs. Strickland	17 December 2022	3	5:00	Las Vegas, Nevada, United States	
Win	18–5	André Fialho	KO (punches)	UFC 275	11 June 2022	2	2:24	Kallang, Singapore	Performance of the Night.
Loss	17–5	Sean Brady	Submission (arm-triangle choke)	UFC 259	6 March 2021	3	3:28	Las Vegas, Nevada, United States	
Win	17–4	Diego Sanchez	Decision (unanimous)	UFC 253	27 September 2020	3	5:00	Abu Dhabi, United Arab Emirates	
Win	16–4	Emil Weber Meek	Decision (unanimous)	UFC Fight Night: Felder vs. Hooker	23 February 2020	3	5:00	Auckland, New Zealand	
Win	15–4	Rostem Akman	Decision (unanimous)	UFC 243	6 October 2019	3	5:00	Melbourne, Australia	
Loss	14–4	Anthony Rocco Martin	Technical Submission (anaconda choke)	UFC Fight Night: dos Santos vs. Tuivasa	2 December 2018	3	1:19	Adelaide, Australia	
Win	14–3	Shinsho Anzai	Technical Submission (rear-naked choke)	UFC Fight Night: Cowboy vs. Edwards	23 June 2018	1	3:44	Kallang, Singapore	
Win	13–3	Li Jingliang	Decision (unanimous)	UFC 221	11 February 2018	3	5:00	Perth, Australia	Fight of the Night.
Win	12–3	Bojan Veličković	Decision (split)	UFC Fight Night: Werdum vs. Tybura	19 November 2017	3	5:00	Sydney, Australia	Return to Welterweight.
Loss	11–3	Andrew Holbrook	Decision (split)	UFC Fight Night: Whittaker vs. Brunson	27 November 2016	3	5:00	Melbourne, Australia	
Loss	11–2	Kevin Lee	TKO (punches)	The Ultimate Fighter: Team Joanna vs. Team Cláudia Finale	8 July 2016	1	4:06	Las Vegas, Nevada, United States	
Win	11–1	Johnny Case	Submission (rear-naked choke)	UFC Fight Night: Hunt vs. Mir	20 March 2016	3	4:45	Brisbane, Australia	Fight of the Night.
Win	10–1	Akbarh Arreola	TKO (doctor stoppage)	UFC 193	15 November 2015	2	5:00	Melbourne, Australia	
Loss	9–1	James Vick	Submission (guillotine choke)	UFC Fight Night: Miocic vs. Hunt	10 May 2015	1	4:53	Adelaide, Australia	
Win	9–0	Vagner Rocha	Technical Submission (rear-naked choke)	UFC Fight Night: Rockhold vs. Bisping	8 November 2014	2	1:52	Sydney, Australia	
Win	8–0	Dashon Johnson	Submission (triangle choke)	UFC Fight Night: Te Huna vs. Marquardt	28 June 2014	3	3:16	Auckland, New Zealand	Lightweight debut. Johnson was deducted one point in round 2 due to strikes to the back of the head.
Win	7–0	Stuart Dare	Decision (unanimous)	Shamrock Events: Kings of Combat 12	26 April 2014	3	5:00	Dandenong, Australia	
Win	6–0	Dean Purdon	Submission (rear-naked choke)	Australian FC 6	24 August 2013	2	2:42	Melbourne, Australia	Australian FC Welterweight Tournament Semifinal.
Win	5–0	Tadija Majic	TKO (punches)	Shamrock Events: Night of Mayhem 7	22 June 2013	1	2:25	Dandenong, Australia	
Win	4–0	Luke Jumeau	Submission (rear-naked choke)	Australian FC 5	10 May 2013	2	1:14	Melbourne, Australia	Australian FC Welterweight Tournament Quarterfinal.
Win	3–0	Callan Potter	Submission (triangle choke)	Shamrock Events: Night of Mayhem 6	16 March 2013	1	1:42	Keysborough, Australia	Won the vacant FXP Welterweight Championship.
Win	2–0	Jason Zivkovic	TKO (punches)	Shamrock Events: Kings of Kombat 8	8 December 2012	1	0:23	Melbourne, Australia	
Win	1–0	Sam Fiamatai	TKO (punches)	Shamrock Events: Night of Mayhem 5	15 September 2012	2	1:47	Dandenong, Australia	Welterweight debut.

Exhibition record breakdown		
1 match	0 wins	1 loss
By knockout	0	0
By submission	0	0
By decision	0	1

Res.	Record	Opponent	Method	Event	Date	Round	Time	Location	Notes
Loss	0–1	Olivier Aubin-Mercier	Decision (unanimous)	The Ultimate Fighter Nations: Canada vs. Australia	27 February 2014 (airdate)	2	5:00	Quebec City, Quebec, Canada	Quarter-finals.

== See also ==
- List of current UFC fighters
- List of male mixed martial artists
- List of converts to Islam
