= UFC Fight Night: Cowboy vs. Edwards =

UFC mixed martial arts event in 2018

- The poster for UFC Fight Night: Cowboy vs. Edwards
- Promotion: Ultimate Fighting Championship
- Date: June 23, 2018
- Venue: Singapore Indoor Stadium
- City: Kallang, Singapore
- Attendance: 6,419

Event chronology
UFC 225: Whittaker vs. Romero 2	UFC Fight Night: Cowboy vs. Edwards	The Ultimate Fighter: Undefeated Finale

UFC Fight Night: Cowboy vs. Edwards (also known as UFC Fight Night 132) was a mixed martial arts event produced by the Ultimate Fighting Championship that was held on June 23, 2018, at Singapore Indoor Stadium in Kallang, Singapore.

== Background ==
A welterweight bout between former UFC Lightweight Championship challenger Donald Cerrone and Leon Edwards headlined the event.

Ashkan Mokhtarian was expected to face Jenel Lausa at the event. However, Mokhtarian pulled out of the fight in early May citing injury. He was replaced by Ulka Sasaki.

Nadia Kassem was scheduled to face Yan Xiaonan at the event. However, Kassem pulled out of the fight in mid-May and was replaced by Viviane Pereira.

== Results ==
Main Card (UFC Fight Pass)
Weight class				Method	Round	Time	Notes
Welterweight	Leon Edwards	def.	Donald Cerrone	Decision (unanimous) (48–47, 48–47, 48–47)	5	5:00
Light Heavyweight	Ovince Saint Preux	def.	Tyson Pedro	Submission (straight armbar)	1	2:54
Women's Flyweight	Jessica Eye	def.	Jessica-Rose Clark	Decision (unanimous) (30–27, 29–28, 29–28)	3	5:00
Welterweight	Li Jingliang	def.	Daichi Abe	Decision (unanimous) (30–26, 30–27, 30–27)	3	5:00
Preliminary Card (UFC Fight Pass)
Bantamweight	Petr Yan	def.	Teruto Ishihara	TKO (punches)	1	3:28
Bantamweight	Song Yadong	def.	Felipe Arantes	KO (elbow and punches)	2	4:59
Featherweight	Shane Young	def.	Rolando Dy	TKO (elbow and punches)	2	4:40
Welterweight	Song Kenan	def.	Hector Aldana	TKO (punches)	2	4:45
Welterweight	Jake Matthews	def.	Shinsho Anzai	Technical Submission (rear-naked choke)	1	3:44
Women's Strawweight	Yan Xiaonan	def.	Viviane Pereira	Decision (unanimous) (29–28, 29–28, 30–27)	3	5:00
Flyweight	Matt Schnell	def.	Naoki Inoue	Decision (split) (29–28, 28–29, 29–28)	3	5:00
Flyweight	Ulka Sasaki	def.	Jenel Lausa	Submission (rear-naked choke)	2	4:04
Women's Flyweight	Ji Yeon Kim	def.	Melinda Fábián	Decision (split) (29–28, 28–29, 29–28)	3	5:00

== Bonus awards ==
The following fighters received $50,000 bonuses:

- Fight of the Night: Shane Young vs. Rolando Dy
- Performance of the Night: Ovince Saint Preux and Song Yadong

== See also ==
- List of UFC events
- 2018 in UFC
- List of current UFC fighters
