= UFC Fight Night: Bisping vs. Le =

UFC mixed martial arts event in 2014

- The poster for UFC Fight Night: Bisping vs. Le
- Promotion: Ultimate Fighting Championship
- Date: August 23, 2014
- Venue: CotaiArena
- City: Macau, SAR, China
- Attendance: 7,022

Event chronology
| UFC Fight Night: Bader vs. Saint Preux | UFC Fight Night: Bisping vs. Le | UFC Fight Night: Henderson vs. dos Anjos |

UFC Fight Night: Bisping vs. Le (also known as UFC Fight Night 48) was a mixed martial arts event produced by the Ultimate Fighting Championship held on August 23, 2014, at the CotaiArena in Macau.

== Background ==
The event was headlined by a middleweight bout between Michael Bisping and Cung Le.

It was the third event that the organization had hosted in the CotaiArena following UFC on Fuel TV: Franklin vs. Le in November 2012 and The Ultimate Fighter China Finale: Kim vs. Hathaway in March 2014.

Also featured on the card was the featherweight final from The Ultimate Fighter: China between Ning Guangyou and Jianping Yang, which was originally expected to take place at The Finale for the inaugural season.

Dong Hyun Kim was expected to face Héctor Lombard at the event. However, Lombard pulled out of the bout and was replaced by Tyron Woodley.

Alberto Mina was expected to face Sheldon Westcott at the event. However, in the days leading up to the event, Westcott pulled out of the bout citing an injury and was replaced by Shinsho Anzai.

== Results ==
Main Card (UFC Fight Pass)
| Weight class | | | | Method | Round | Time | Notes |
|---|---|---|---|---|---|---|---|
| Middleweight | Michael Bisping | def. | Cung Le | TKO (knee and punches) | 4 | 0:57 |
| Welterweight | Tyron Woodley | def. | Dong Hyun Kim | TKO (punches) | 1 | 1:01 |
| Lightweight | Zhang Lipeng | def. | Brendan O'Reilly | Decision (unanimous) (29–28, 30–27, 30–27) | 3 | 5:00 |
| Featherweight | Ning Guangyou | def. | Jianping Yang | Decision (unanimous) (29–28, 29–28, 29–28) | 3 | 5:00 | (Note: The Ultimate Fighter: China Featherweight Tournament Final) |
Preliminary card (UFC Fight Pass)
| Welterweight | Wang Sai | def. | Danny Mitchell | Decision (unanimous) (29–28, 29–28, 29–28) | 3 | 5:00 |
| Welterweight | Alberto Mina | def. | Shinsho Anzai | TKO (punches) | 1 | 4:17 |
| Bantamweight | Ulka Sasaki | def. | Roland Delorme | Submission (rear-naked choke) | 1 | 1:06 |
| Welterweight | Colby Covington | def. | Anying Wang | TKO (submission to punches) | 1 | 4:50 |
| Bantamweight | Royston Wee | def. | Yao Zhikui | Decision (split) (29–28, 27–30, 29–28) | 3 | 5:00 |
| Women's Bantamweight | Milana Dudieva | def. | Elizabeth Phillips | Decision (split) (30–27, 28–29, 29–28) | 3 | 5:00 |

== Bonus awards ==
The following fighters received $50,000 bonuses:

- Fight of the Night: None awarded
- Performance of the Night: Michael Bisping, Tyron Woodley, Alberto Mina and Yuta Sasaki

== See also ==
- List of UFC events
- 2014 in UFC
