= Dominique Steele =

American mixed martial arts (MMA) fighter

Dominique Thadeus Steele
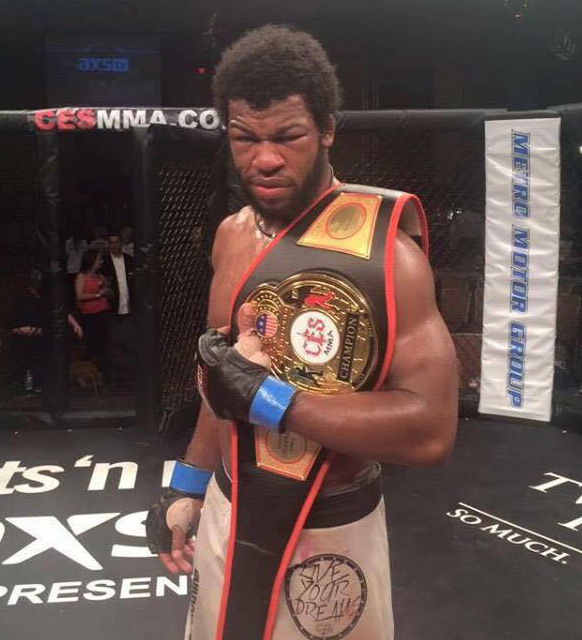
- Born: January 25, 1988 (age 38); Cincinnati, Ohio, U.S.
- Other names: Non-Stop Action-Packed
- Height: 5 ft 10 in (1.78 m)
- Weight: 185 lb (84 kg; 13 st 3 lb)
- Division: Heavyweight; Light Heavyweight; Middleweight; Welterweight
- Reach: 73 in (190 cm)
- Fighting out of: Cincinnati, Ohio, U.S.
- Team: Team Vision
- Years active: 2011–present

Mixed martial arts record
- Total: 32
- Wins: 20
- By knockout: 9
- By decision: 11
- Losses: 12
- By knockout: 7
- By decision: 5

Amateur record
- Total: 10
- Wins: 8
- By knockout: 4
- By submission: 4
- Losses: 1
- No contests: 1

Other information
- Mixed martial arts record from Sherdog

Dominique Steele (born January 25, 1988) is an American professional mixed martial artist currently competing in the Middleweight division. A professional competitor since 2011, he has also competed for the UFC, Strikeforce, Bellator, Fight Nights Global, the Xtreme Fighting Championships, B2 Fighting Series and CES MMA, where he was the Welterweight Champion.

== Background ==
Born in Cincinnati and raised in Norwood, Ohio, Steele attended Norwood High School, graduating in 2006. At Norwood, Steele was a standout in wrestling, and held an impressive overall record of 43–1, winning every tournament the school competed in until injuring his ACL at the district tournament during his senior season (his only loss).

== Mixed martial arts career ==
=== Early career ===
Steele began competing in amateur fights in 2009, compiling a record of 8–1 with one No Contest before turning professional in 2011. He competed in several different regional promotions across the Ohio River Valley, including one fight stints in both Strikeforce and Bellator MMA, compiling a record of 13–5.

After his victory over Chuck O'Neil in June 2015, Steele signed with the Ultimate Fighting Championship.

=== Ultimate Fighting Championship ===
Steele is expected to make his promotional debut as a short notice replacement against Zak Cummings on July 25, 2015, at UFC on Fox 16, filling in for Antônio Braga Neto who pulled out citing injury. He lost the fight via TKO in the first round.

Steele was expected to face Hyun Gyu Lim on November 28, 2015, at UFC Fight Night 79. However, Lim pulled out of the fight in the week leading up to the event and was replaced by promotional newcomer Dong Hyun Ma. Steele won the fight via KO in the third round. The win also earned Steele his first Performance of the Night bonus award.

Steele faced Danny Roberts on April 23, 2016, at UFC 197. He lost the back-and-forth fight via unanimous decision. Both participants were awarded a Fight of the Night bonus.

Steele next faced Court McGee on August 6, 2016, at UFC Fight Night 92. He lost the fight via unanimous decision.

Steele was expected to face Kyle Noke on November 27, 2016, at UFC Fight Night 101. However, Steele pulled out of the fight on October 21 and was replaced by Omari Akhmedov.

Steele faced promotional newcomer Luke Jumeau on June 11, 2017, at UFC Fight Night 110. He lost the fight via unanimous decision.

=== Post-UFC career ===
On February 1, 2018, it was announced that Steele had signed a multi-fight contract with Fight Nights Global.

== Championships and achievements ==
=== Mixed martial arts ===
- Ultimate Fighting Championship
  - Fight of the Night (One time) vs. Danny Roberts
  - Performance of the Night (One time) vs. Dong Hyun Ma

== Mixed martial arts record ==
Professional record breakdown
32 matches	20 wins	12 losses
By knockout	8	7
By submission	1	0
By decision	11	5

Res.	Record	Opponent	Method	Event	Date	Round	Time	Location	Notes
Win	20–12	Peter New	KO (punches)	B2 Fighting Series 168	June 25, 2022	1	2:00	Louisville, Kentucky, United States	Light Heavyweight debut.
Win	19–12	Kelvin Fitial	Decision (unanimous)	B2 Fighting Series 152	March 19, 2022	3	5:00	Summersville, West Virginia, United States	Heavyweight debut.
Loss	18–12	Teddy Ash	TKO (doctor stoppage)	Unified MMA 36	March 1, 2019	4	5:00	Enoch, Alberta, Canada	Lost the Unified MMA Middleweight Championship.
Win	18–11	Teddy Ash	TKO (punches)	Unified MMA 35	December 7, 2018	1	4:51	Enoch, Alberta, Canada	Won the Unified MMA Middleweight Championship.
Loss	17–11	Matt Dwyer	KO (punch)	Xcessive Force FC 18	July 21, 2018	1	4:59	Penticton, British Columbia, Canada	For the vacant XFFC Middleweight Championship.
Win	17–10	Travis Davis	Decision (unanimous)	Iron Tiger Fight Series 82	June 2, 2018	3	5:00	Columbus, Ohio, United States	Return to Middleweight.
Loss	16–10	Nikolay Aleksakhin	TKO (punches)	Fight Nights Global 83	February 22, 2018	1	2:37	Moscow, Russia	
Win	16–9	Karl Amoussou	Decision (unanimous)	Cage Warriors 89	November 25, 2017	3	5:00	Antwerp, Belgium	Catchweight (172.9 lb) bout; Steele missed weight.
Win	15–9	Portland Pringle III	Decision (unanimous)	Colosseum Combat 41	October 7, 2017	3	5:00	Kokomo, Indiana, United States	Middleweight bout.
Loss	14–9	Luke Jumeau	Decision (unanimous)	UFC Fight Night: Lewis vs. Hunt	June 11, 2017	3	5:00	Auckland, New Zealand	
Loss	14–8	Court McGee	Decision (unanimous)	UFC Fight Night: Rodríguez vs. Caceres	August 6, 2016	3	5:00	Salt Lake City, Utah, United States	
Loss	14–7	Danny Roberts	Decision (unanimous)	UFC 197	April 23, 2016	3	5:00	Las Vegas, Nevada, United States	Fight of the Night.
Win	14–6	Ma Dong-hyun	KO (slam)	UFC Fight Night: Henderson vs. Masvidal	November 28, 2015	3	0:27	Seoul, South Korea	Performance of the Night.
Loss	13–6	Zak Cummings	TKO (punches)	UFC on Fox: Dillashaw vs. Barão 2	July 25, 2015	1	0:43	Chicago, Illinois, United States	
Win	13–5	Chuck O'Neil	Decision (unanimous)	CES MMA 29	June 12, 2015	5	5:00	Lincoln, Rhode Island, United States	Won the CES Welterweight Championship.
Win	12–5	Nick Duell	Decision (unanimous)	North American Allied Fight Series: Caged Vengeance 16	March 7, 2015	3	5:00	Canton, Ohio, United States	Catchweight (180 lb) bout.
Loss	11–5	Jose Figueroa	TKO (punches)	Gladiators of the Cage: The Road to Glory 7	July 19, 2014	1	2:56	Cleveland, Ohio, United States	
Win	11–4	Dan Hornbuckle	Decision (unanimous)	North American Allied Fight Series: Driven MMA 1	March 1, 2014	3	5:00	Canton, Ohio, United States	
Win	10–4	Keith Cunagin	TKO (submission to punches)	Turf Wars Extreme Fighting 15	January 18, 2014	2	4:48	Florence, Kentucky, United States	
Win	9–4	Ryan Thomas	Decision (unanimous)	XFC 27	December 13, 2013	3	5:00	Muskegon, Michigan, United States	
Win	8–4	Nate Moore	Decision (unanimous)	MMA Xtreme: Fists Will Fly	August 24, 2013	3	5:00	Evansville, Indiana, United States	
Win	7–4	Joshua Thorpe	TKO (punches)	Absolute Action MMA 33	June 7, 2013	2	3:52	Florence, Kentucky, United States	Welterweight debut.
Loss	6–4	Travis Clark	KO (punches)	North American Allied Fight Series: Caged Vengeance 13	March 30, 2013	1	1:10	Canton, Ohio, United States	Catchweight (188 lb) bout; Steele missed weight.
Loss	6–3	Brian Rogers	Decision (unanimous)	Bellator 78	October 26, 2012	3	5:00	Dayton, Ohio, United States	
Loss	6–2	David Branch	Decision (unanimous)	Pure MMA: The Beginning	January 22, 2012	3	5:00	Plains, Pennsylvania, United States	
Win	6–1	Donald Crawford Jr.	Decision (unanimous)	Valley Fight League 34	January 7, 2012	3	5:00	Williamson, West Virginia, United States	
Win	5–1	Joshua Blanchard	TKO (punches)	Spartan FC 10	November 11, 2011	1	3:27	Ashland, Kentucky, United States	
Win	4–1	Chris Mierzwiak	Decision (unanimous)	Strikeforce: Barnett vs. Kharitonov	September 10, 2011	3	5:00	Cincinnati, Ohio, United States	
Win	3–1	Ricco Ralston	TKO (submission to punches)	Annihilation Productions: Crossroads of Redemption	July 23, 2011	1	3:57	Lawrenceburg, Indiana, United States	
Win	2–1	Keenan Curry	TKO (punches)	International Combat Events 53	June 4, 2011	1	4:30	Cincinnati, Ohio, United States	
Win	1–1	George Oiler	TKO (submission to punches)	Absolute Action MMA 13	May 7, 2011	1	2:07	Florence, Kentucky, United States	
Loss	0–1	Jason Butcher	KO (punch)	Spartan FC 7	February 25, 2011	1	0:45	Lexington, Kentucky, United States	Middleweight debut.

== See also ==
- List of current UFC fighters
- List of male mixed martial artists
