= Legend Fighting Championship =

MMA promoter based in Hong Kong

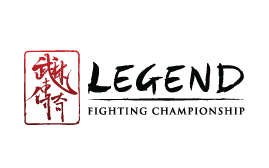
- Type: Private
- Industry: Mixed martial arts promotion
- Founded: 2009
- Headquarters: China
- Parent: Legend Entertainment Limited
- Website: http://www.legendfc.com

Legend Fighting Championship (Legend FC) started as a Hong Kong–based mixed martial arts (MMA) organisation which invited national champion fighters from throughout the Asia-Pacific to compete for regional supremacy. Legend was unique among MMA tournaments in that it focused exclusively on native Asia-Pacific fighters. The company was sold in April 2014 to Kwokman Productions. The promotion re-launched in September 2018 as a China-based organization.

== About Legend ==
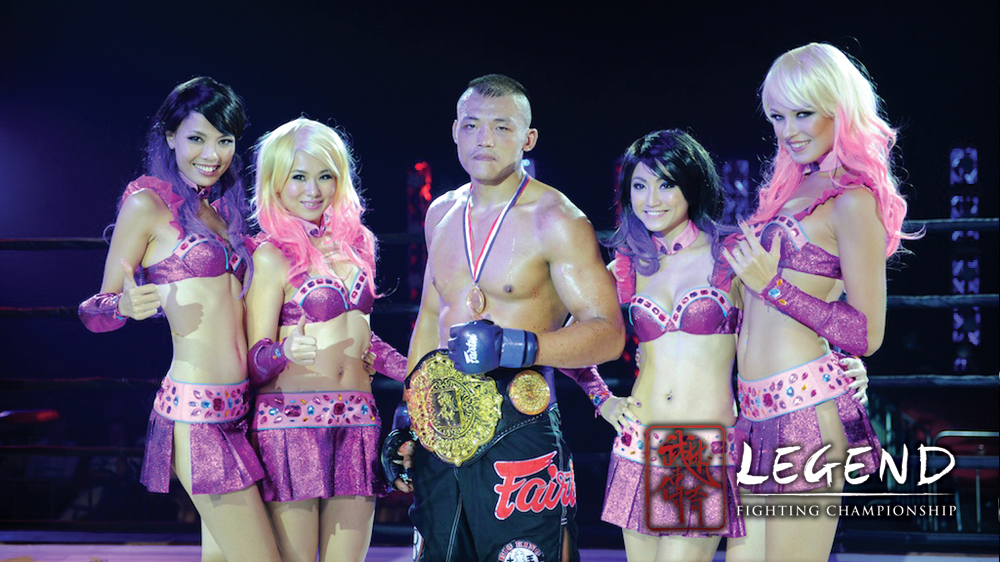
China's Liu Wenbo winning the Legend FC Middleweight Championship at Legend FC 10

Founded in 2009, Legend Fighting Championship (Legend) was the Asia-Pacific championship of Mixed Martial Arts (MMA). Legend invited national champion MMA fighters from throughout the Asia-Pacific region to compete in a freestyle tournament using interdisciplinary martial arts skills in supervised matches under a strict set of rules designed to promote athlete safety and sportsmanship.

The Legend event debuted in January 2010, when Legend hosted a fight in the Star Hall in Hong Kong, attended by more than 1,000 people. The Legend show soon expanded its activities in the Asia-Pacific region, achieving international broadcasting and recruiting regional MMA fighters to the show’s roster.

In spring 2011, Legend signed an agreement with Macau mega-resort and casino City of Dreams to produce an ongoing series of MMA tournaments, under the title “City of Dreams exclusively presents Legend Fighting Championship.” The first event of this partnership took place on July 16, 2011.

In January 2012, Legend Fighting Championship announced the signing of an exclusive distribution and syndication agreement with ESPN International (ESPN). Under the terms of the agreement, ESPN will serve as the sole distribution agent of all Legend broadcast content in Asia, Oceania, the Indian sub-continent, Europe, the Middle East and Africa.

Legend's new partners have refocused the company specifically on Chinese fighters and the Chinese market, in terms of both fight cards and the content they will produce. Legend re-launched with a fight card in the southern Chinese city of Guangzhou in September 2018.

In June 2019, Legend announced its return to Macau, China on September 14, 2019, at the MGM Theater in Cotai.

== TV broadcast ==
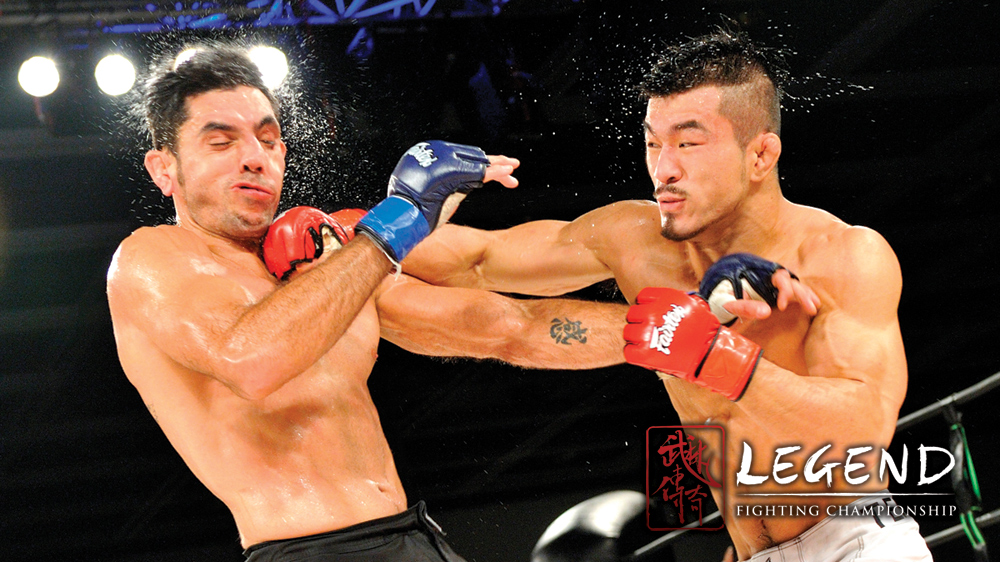
Legend Fighting Championship 3, Hong Kong.

On the heels of their successful first event, Legend signed a broadcast agreement with KIX (an Asian action TV channel and subsidiary of Tiger Gate Entertainment) to broadcast its MMA competitions in Hong Kong, Singapore, Indonesia, and the Philippines. Since then, Legend has signed agreements with broadcasters in China, Australia, New Zealand, the United States, and Canada.

In October 2012, Legend signed an agreement with Sony Pictures Television networks for them to broadcast Legend Fighting Championship on AXN in 21 territories across the region.

In November 2012, Legend Fighting Championship and ESPN International announced a broadcast agreement to bring the Asia-Pacific Championship of Mixed Martial Arts to ESPN television and broadband channels in 109 countries in Australia and New Zealand, the Caribbean, Latin America, the Middle East and North Africa, sub-Saharan Africa and cruise ships in these territories.

In North America Legend is broadcast on Pay-Per-View and Video-On-Demand on all the major Pay-Per-View providers and also holds the distinction of being the first sports organisation from China to be featured on North American Pay-Per-View.

China consists of one of the biggest audiences for Legend. In China alone, Legend is available to more than 600 million viewers nationwide. Legend events are also broadcast in China on major video portals Tencent, Weibo, Youku, Zhibo and others. Additional broadcast partners include Guangdong TV, Shenzhen TV, and various other networks in China.

Worldwide, Legend is broadcast in 279 million homes in 152 countries via 22 broadcast partners including AXN in SE Asia, ESPN International and all major pay-per-view operators in the US and Canada.

== Company background ==
Legend was co-founded by Mike Haskamp and Chris Pollak, former classmates and Rugby teammates at Columbia Business School. Pollak spent eight years at management consultancy McKinsey & Company, primarily in their media group. Haskamp was formerly an investment banker at Lehman Brothers. The partners started running the company out of a shared apartment in Hong Kong in late 2009.

In July 2011, Legend closed a venture capital investment from CA Media and Diamond Ridge Ventures. CA Media is a fund focused on media and entertainment businesses throughout the Asia-Pacific region. It was founded by Peter Chernin (former President and COO of News Corporation) and Paul Aiello (former CEO of STAR TV and head of media investment banking at Morgan Stanley Asia). Diamond Ridge is a sports and media investment fund.

After taking a hiatus and securing new partners, Legend re-emerged with Matthew Kwok as its Chairman. Kwok was the original content and broadcast producer for Legend, and the founder of Kwokman Productions. In early 2019, Legend announced additional partnerships with athlete manager Audie Attar from Paradigm Sports Management, and Berjaya Assets Bhd, one of Malaysia's largest conglomerates. It is now defunct.

== Rules ==
Legend competitions take place in an eight-sided MMA arena called the "Ba Fang".

Legend contest rules are a hybrid of the Unified Rules of Mixed Martial Arts and Pride-style MMA rules. Some of the rules unique to Legend are:

• No elbow drops.

• All contests (including championship fights) are three rounds of five minutes duration.

• There are no draws at Legend. If two fighters are tied on points on a judge's scorecard at the end of three rounds, the judge must make a determination as to which fighter he/she believes won the overall fight.

== Weight divisions ==
▪ Bantamweight: Under 50 kilograms

▪ Featherweight: 50 to 60 kilograms

▪ Lightweight: 60 to 70 kilograms

▪ Welterweight: 70 to 80 kilograms

▪ Middleweight: 80 to 90 kilograms

▪ Cruiserweight: 90 to 100 kilograms

▪ Heavyweight: Over 100 kilograms

== Past Legend champions ==
Division	Weight limit	Champion	Since	Title Defenses
Heavyweight	Unlimited	Vacant		0
Cruiserweight	100 kg (220.5 lb; 15.7 st)	Vacant		0
Middleweight	90 kg (198.4 lb; 14.2 st)	(China) Liu Wenbo	August 24, 2012	0
Welterweight	80 kg (176.4 lb; 12.6 st)	(China) Li Jingliang	April 27, 2013	0
Lightweight	70 kg (154.3 lb; 11.0 st)	(Japan) Koji Ando	April 27, 2013	0
Featherweight	60 kg (132.3 lb; 9.4 st)	(Japan) Yusuke Kawanago	March 30, 2012	0
Bantamweight	50 kg (110.2 lb; 7.9 st)	(China) Ji Xian	April 27, 2013	0

== List of events ==
#	Legend Event	Date	Venue	City
1	Legend Fighting Championship 1	January 11, 2010	Star Hall	Hong Kong
2	Legend Fighting Championship 2	June 24, 2010	Star Hall	Hong Kong
3	Legend Fighting Championship 3	September 24, 2010	Hong Kong Convention and Exhibition Centre	Hong Kong
4	Legend Fighting Championship 4	January 27, 2011	AsiaWorld-Expo	Hong Kong
5	Legend Fighting Championship 5	July 16, 2011	City of Dreams (casino)	Macau
6	Legend Fighting Championship 6	October 30, 2011	City of Dreams (casino)	Macau
7	Legend Fighting Championship 7	February 11, 2012	City of Dreams (casino)	Macau
8	Legend Fighting Championship 8	March 30, 2012	AsiaWorld-Expo	Hong Kong
9	Legend Fighting Championship 9	June 16, 2012	City of Dreams (casino)	Macau
10	Legend Fighting Championship 10	August 24, 2012	AsiaWorld-Expo	Hong Kong
11	Legend Fighting Championship 11	April 27, 2013	Chin Woo Stadium	Kuala Lumpur, Malaysia
12	Legend Fighting Championship 12	September 15, 2018	Tian He Stadium	Guangzhou, China
13	Legend Fighting Championship 13	September 14, 2019	MGM Theater	Macau
