= Shinsho Anzai =

Japanese mixed martial arts (MMA) fighter (born 1985)

- Born: Shinsho Anzai; December 1, 1985 (age 40); Saitama, Japan
- Other names: "Animal"
- Nationality: Japanese
- Height: 5 ft 7 in (1.70 m)
- Weight: 171 lb (78 kg; 12 st 3 lb)
- Division: Light Heavyweight; Middleweight; Welterweight
- Reach: 70 in (178 cm)
- Fighting out of: Toshima, Tokyo, Japan
- Team: Team Climb
- Years active: 2009–present

Mixed martial arts record
- Total: 15
- Wins: 9
- By knockout: 5
- By decision: 4
- Losses: 6
- By knockout: 3
- By submission: 2
- By decision: 1

Other information
- University: Meiji University, Kokugakuin University
- Mixed martial arts record from Sherdog

Shinsho Anzai (Japanese: 安西信昌, Anzai Shinshō; born December 1, 1985) is a Japanese mixed martial artist and wrestler. A professional competitor since 2009, he has fought in the UFC, Bellator, Pancrase and King of the Cage.

== Background ==
Born and raised in Japan, Anzai began wrestling in high school at the age of 15. Anzai later continued wrestling at Meiji University, and also attended Kokugakuin University. In amateur wrestling, Anzai was second place at the 2005 All-Japan Junior Olympic Cup, was first place at the 2008 All-Japan Combat Wrestling Championship (over 80 kg). Anzai also won the ADCC Asia Trials in 2011 at 99 kg and 2013 at 88 kg, respectively.

== Mixed martial arts career ==
=== Early career ===
Anzai made his professional MMA debut in May 2009. He fought exclusively in his native Japan for the Pancrase and King of the Cage (Japan) promotions. During the next six years he amassed a record of 8–1.

=== Ultimate Fighting Championship ===
In his UFC debut, Anzai stepped in to replace Sheldon Westcott against Alberto Mina on August 23, 2014, at UFC Fight Night 48. He lost the fight via TKO in the first round.

In his second fight for the promotion, Anzai faced Roger Zapata on September 26, 2015, at UFC Fight Night: Barnett vs. Nelson. He won the fight via TKO due to a hand injury Zapata sustained in the third round.

After nearly two years away from the promotion, Anzai returned to face Luke Jumeau on September 23, 2017, at UFC Fight Night: Saint Preux vs. Okami. He won the fight by unanimous decision.

Anzai faced Jake Matthews on June 23, 2018, at UFC Fight Night 132. He lost the fight via rear-naked choke in the first round.

Anzai was released from the UFC in July 2019.

=== Post-UFC career ===
After his release from the UFC, Anzai won one fight in his native Deep promotion before signing with the Bellator. He made his promotional debut against Michael Page at Bellator & Rizin: Japan on December 29, 2019. He lost the fight via knockout in the second round.

After an almost 3 year layoff, Anzai returned against Victor Valenzuela on May 13, 2023 at Combate Global: Mexico vs. Japan, losing the bout via ground and pound TKO in the second round.

Anzai fought Igor Tanabe at RIZIN 46 on December 31, 2023. He lost the bout via rear-naked choke in the first round.

== Championships and achievements ==
- Pancrase
  - Middleweight King of Pancrase (One time)

== Mixed martial arts record ==
Professional record breakdown
15 matches	9 wins	6 losses
By knockout	5	3
By submission	0	2
By decision	4	1

Res.	Record	Opponent	Method	Event	Date	Round	Time	Location	Notes
Loss	9–6	Igor Tanabe	Technical Submission (rear-naked choke)	Rizin 45	December 31, 2023	1	1:32	Saitama, Japan	
Loss	9–5	Victor Valenzuela	TKO (elbows and punches)	Combate Global: Mexico vs. Japan	May 13, 2023	2	1:54	Miami, Florida, United States	
Loss	9–4	Michael Page	KO (punch)	Bellator 237	December 29, 2019	2	0:23	Saitama, Japan	Catchweight (173 lb) bout.
Win	9–3	Yoichiro Sato	Technical Decision (majority)	DEEP 91 Impact	September 8, 2019	2	0:39	Tokyo, Japan	
Loss	8–3	Jake Matthews	Technical Submission (rear-naked choke)	UFC Fight Night: Cowboy vs. Edwards	June 23, 2018	1	3:44	Kallang, Singapore	
Win	8–2	Luke Jumeau	Decision (unanimous)	UFC Fight Night: Saint Preux vs. Okami	September 23, 2017	3	5:00	Saitama, Japan	
Win	7–2	Roger Zapata	TKO (hand injury)	UFC Fight Night: Barnett vs. Nelson	September 26, 2015	3	0:47	Saitama, Japan	
Loss	6–2	Alberto Mina	TKO (punches)	UFC Fight Night: Bisping vs. Le	August 23, 2014	1	4:17	Macau SAR, China	Welterweight debut.
Win	6–1	Ryo Kawamura	TKO (punches)	Pancrase 259	June 29, 2014	1	2:52	Tokyo, Japan	Won the Pancrase Middleweight Championship.
Win	5–1	Will Noland	TKO (punches)	Pancrase 252: 20th Anniversary	September 29, 2013	1	2:30	Yokohama, Japan	
Win	4–1	Yuji Hisamatsu	Decision (unanimous)	Pancrase 247	May 19, 2013	2	5:00	Tokyo, Japan	Middleweight debut.
Win	3–1	Lee Hyun-gwan	TKO (soccer kick)	Pancrase: Progress Tour 12	November 12, 2012	1	4:36	Tokyo, Japan	
Win	2–1	Yuji Sakuragi	Decision (unanimous)	Pancrase: Progress Tour 3	May 11, 2012	2	5:00	Tokyo, Japan	
Win	1–1	Akihito Tanaka	TKO (punches)	Pancrase: Impressive Tour 8	August 7, 2011	1	4:16	Tokyo, Japan	
Loss	0–1	Jerry Nelson	Decision (split)	KOTC: Toryumon	January 30, 2010	3	3:00	Ginowan, Japan	Light Heavyweight debut.
