= Daichi Abe =

Japanese mixed martial arts fighter

- Born: 27 November 1991 (age 34); Niigata Prefecture, Japan
- Other names: Daichi Zelos
- Height: 180 cm (5 ft 11 in)
- Weight: 77 kg (170 lb; 12 st 2 lb)
- Division: Middleweight; Welterweight; Lightweight
- Reach: 71 in (180 cm)
- Fighting out of: Tokyo, Japan
- Team: HMC Japan
- Rank: Black belt in Judo
- Years active: 2011–present

Mixed martial arts record
- Total: 26
- Wins: 15
- By knockout: 8
- By submission: 1
- By decision: 6
- Losses: 11
- By knockout: 3
- By submission: 5
- By decision: 3

Other information
- Mixed martial arts record from Sherdog

Daichi Abe (Japanese: 阿部 大治, Abe Daichi; born November 27, 1991) is a Japanese mixed martial artist competing in the Welterweight division. He is the former DEEP Welterweight Champion. A professional mixed martial artist since 2016, he has competed in the Ultimate Fighting Championship and was also the Welterweight King of Pancrase.

== Background ==
Abe was born in Niigata Prefecture, Japan. He embarked on his martial arts journey at eight years old starting with Judo where he was the Junior Judo National Champion. During his teenage years, he trained in both boxing and kickboxing. He won the 2011 Rising Rookies Heavyweight Cup and the 2014 J-Network Light Heavyweight title in kickboxing and amassed a record of 14–10 with seven by knockout. Abe eventually transitioned to mixed martial arts in 2016, joining Pancrase in his professional MMA debut.

== Mixed martial arts career ==
=== Early career ===
Abe made his professional debut on April 24, 2016, against Ryosuke Igarashi at Pancrase 277 and won the fight via technical knockout 24 seconds into the first round. He won three more fights in Pancrase within the span of five months and was booked for a title fight against Hiromitsu Miura to become the Welterweight King of Pancrase. He won the fight via technical knockout in round two. He amassed a record of 5–0 prior to being signed by the UFC, vacating the title after only one month of holding it.

=== Ultimate Fighting Championship ===
Abe made his promotional debut on September 22, 2017, at UFC Fight Night: Saint Preux vs. Okami against Hyun Gyu Lim. He won the fight via unanimous decision.

He next faced Luke Jumeau on February 10, 2018, at UFC 221. He lost the fight via unanimous decision.

His third fight came on June 23, 2018, at UFC Fight Night: Cowboy vs. Edwards against Li Jingliang. He lost the fight via unanimous decision.

In October 2018, it was announced that Abe was released from UFC.

=== ONE Championship ===
Daichi Abe signed with ONE Championship in 2018 and was scheduled to fight former ONE welterweight title challenger Luís Santos at ONE Championship: Pursuit of Greatness on October 26, 2018. He lost the fight via TKO in the first round.

Abe next faced Ev Ting at ONE Championship: Masters of Destiny on July 12, 2019. He lost the fight via rear naked choke submission.

=== Return to regional circuit ===
Abe faced Yoichiro Sato at DEEP 95 on August 23, 2020. He won the fight via split decision.

Abe then headlined DEEP 98 against Yuta Watanabe on November 1, 2020. Abe won the fight via first-round technical knockout.

Daichi then faced Gota Yamashita for the interim DEEP Welterweight Championship at DEEP 100 on February 21, 2021. He won the fight and claimed the interim title via first-round technical knockout due to an injury. He was later promoted to undisputed champion.

Daichi faced Akira Okada at Rizin 31 - Yokohama on October 24, 2021. He lost the bout via north–south choke in the second round.

Abe was booked to face Kiichi Kunimoto at Rizin 34 – Osaka on March 20, 2022. He won the fight by unanimous decision.

Abe next fought Marcos Yoshio de Souza at Rizin 37 on July 31, 2022. He won via knockout in the second round after a strong right hook and a controversial soccer kick.

Abe faced Yukinari Tamura on October 23, 2022, at Rizin 39, and dominated from start to finish in the stands, winning a 3-0 decision.

Abe faced Shingo Suzuki on February 11, 2023, at DEEP 112 for the DEEP Welterweight Championship, losing the bout via guillotine choke in the second round.

Abe faced Igor Tanabe at Super Rizin 2 on July 30, 2023, losing the fight via a heel hook submission in the first round.

Abe faced Kota Ossman at Rizin Landmark 8 on February 24, 2024, knocking out his opponent in the first round.

Abe next faced Ibuki Shimada at DEEP 120 on July 14, 2024. He would lose the fight via first round submission.

== Championships and accomplishments ==
=== Mixed martial arts ===
- Pancrase
  - Welterweight King of Pancrase (one time; former) vs. Hiromitsu Miura
  - 2016 Pancrase Neo Blood Tournament Welterweight Winner
- DEEP
  - DEEP Welterweight Champion (one time; former)

=== Kickboxing ===
- J-NETWORK
  - 2014 J-NETWORK Light Heavyweight Championship (inaugural; former)
- RISE
  - 2011 RISE Rising Rookies Cup Winner

== Mixed martial arts record ==
Professional record breakdown
25 matches	14 wins	11 losses
By knockout	8	3
By submission	1	5
By decision	5	3

Res.	Record	Opponent	Method	Event	Date	Round	Time	Location	Notes
Loss	14–11	Kohei Kadono	Decision (unanimous)	DEEP 131 Impact: 25th Anniversary	May 4, 2026	3	5:00	Yokohama, Japan	
Win	14–10	Yutaka Kobayashi	Submission (inverted triangle choke)	DEEP Tokyo Impact 2025 5th Round	November 23, 2025	1	1:06	Tokyo, Japan	
Loss	13–10	Jang Yun-seong	TKO (punches)	Z-Fight Night: Origin 1	April 5, 2025	3	0:29	Seoul, South Korea	
Loss	13–9	Yoon Tae-young	TKO (doctor stoppage)	Japan Martial Arts Expo Prologue	October 19, 2024	2	4:07	Yokohama, Japan	Catchweight (183 lb) bout.
Loss	13–8	Ibuki Shimada	Submission (rear-naked choke)	DEEP 120 Impact	July 14, 2024	1	3:06	Tokyo, Japan	
Win	13–7	Kota Shirakawa	KO (punch)	Rizin Landmark 8	February 24, 2024	1	1:35	Saga, Japan	
Loss	12–7	Igor Tanabe	Submission (inverted heel hook)	Super Rizin 2	July 30, 2023	1	4:34	Saitama, Japan	Middleweight bout.
Loss	12–6	Shingo Suzuki	Submission (guillotine choke)	DEEP 112 Impact	February 11, 2023	2	2:05	Tokyo, Japan	Lost the DEEP Welterweight Championship.
Win	12–5	Yukinari Tamura	Decision (unanimous)	Rizin 39	October 23, 2022	3	5:00	Fukuoka, Japan	
Win	11–5	Marcos Yoshio de Souza	KO (punch and soccer kick)	Rizin 37	July 31, 2022	2	3:02	Saitama, Japan	Catchweight (176 lb) bout.
Win	10–5	Kiichi Kunimoto	Decision (unanimous)	Rizin 34	March 20, 2022	3	5:00	Osaka, Japan	Return to Welterweight.
Loss	9–5	Akira Okada	Submission (north-south choke)	Rizin 31	24 October 2021	2	4:34	Yokohama, Japan	Lightweight debut.
Win	9–4	Gota Yamashita	TKO (finger injury)	DEEP 100 Impact	February 21, 2021	1	2:34	Tokyo, Japan	Won the interim DEEP Welterweight Championship. Later promoted to undisputed champion.
Win	8–4	Yuta Watanabe	TKO (punches)	DEEP 98 Impact	November 1, 2020	1	4:17	Tokyo, Japan	
Win	7–4	Yoichiro Sato	Decision (split)	DEEP 95 Impact	August 23, 2020	3	5:00	Tokyo, Japan	
Loss	6–4	Ev Ting	Submission (rear-naked choke)	ONE: Masters of Destiny	July 12, 2019	2	4:44	Kuala Lumpur, Malaysia	Return to Welterweight.
Loss	6–3	Luís Santos	KO (body kick)	ONE: Pursuit of Greatness	October 26, 2018	1	0:33	Yangon, Myanmar	Middleweight debut.
Loss	6–2	Li Jingliang	Decision (unanimous)	UFC Fight Night: Cowboy vs. Edwards	June 23, 2018	3	5:00	Kallang, Singapore	
Loss	6–1	Luke Jumeau	Decision (unanimous)	UFC 221	February 10, 2018	3	5:00	Perth, Australia	
Win	6–0	Lim Hyun-gyu	Decision (unanimous)	UFC Fight Night: Saint Preux vs. Okami	September 22, 2017	3	5:00	Saitama, Japan	
Win	5–0	Hiromitsu Miura	TKO (punches)	Pancrase 288	July 2, 2017	2	0:26	Tokyo, Japan	Won the Pancrase Welterweight Championship.
Win	4–0	Bryson Kamaka	KO (punches)	Capone's Productions: Mid-Pac	February 17, 2017	1	0:35	Waipahu, Hawaii, United States	
Win	3–0	Kenta Takagi	Decision (unanimous)	Pancrase 282	November 13, 2016	3	5:00	Tokyo, Japan	
Win	2–0	Yuta Nakamura	KO (punch)	Pancrase 280	September 11, 2016	1	2:08	Tokyo, Japan	
Win	1–0	Ryosuke Igarashi	TKO (punches)	Pancrase 277	April 24, 2016	1	0:24	Tokyo, Japan	Welterweight debut.

== Muay Thai and Kickboxing record ==
Muay Thai and Kickboxing Record
11 Wins (7 (T)KOs), 4 Losses, 0 Draw
Date	Result	Opponent	Event	Location	Method	Round	Time
2024-10-05	Win	(Thailand) Kongtualai JMBoxingGym	RISE Fight Club 2	Tokyo, Japan	Decision (Unanimous)	3	3:00
2014-08-17	Win	(Japan) Tomoya Fuijta	J-KICK 2014 ～The sign of brave heart～ 3rd	Tokyo, Japan	TKO (Referee stoppage)	1	2:31
Wins the inaugural J-NETWORK Light Heavyweight title.
2014-03-29	Win	(Japan) KONZISI BADBOY	J-KICK 2014 ～The sign of brave heart～ 1st	Tokyo, Japan	Decision (Unanimous)	3	3:00
2014-01-26	Win	(Japan) Kenji Usui	J-FIGHT in SHINJUKU ～vol.35～	Tokyo, Japan	KO	1	2:53
2013-09-16	Loss	(Japan) Toshio Matsumoto	SNKA TITANS NEOS XIV	Tokyo, Japan	Decision (Unanimous)	3	3:00
2013-07-21	Win	(Japan) Shiyoh Gen	SNKA MAGNUM 32	Tokyo, Japan	TKO	1	2:37
2013-06-09	Win	(Japan) Dai Yoshizawa	TNK1 feat. REBELS	Tokyo, Japan	TKO	1	2:02
2013-01-14	Loss	(Japan) Hidekazu Kimura	J-KICK 2013 ～Road to the King of J～ 1st	Tokyo, Japan	Ext.R Decision (Unanimous)	4	3:00
2012-10-28	Loss	(Japan) Tiger Nuts	RISE ZERO	Tokyo, Japan	Decision (Unanimous)	3	3:00
2012-07-01	Win	(Japan) Kazuki Ozawa	RISE 89	Tokyo, Japan	Decision (Unanimous)	3	3:00
2012-04-01	Win	(Japan) Taepodong Katsumi	RISE ZERO	Tokyo, Japan	KO	2	2:35
2011-12-18	Loss	(Japan) Hidekazu Kimura	RISE ZERO	Tokyo, Japan	KO	3	2:53
2011-09-23	Win	(Japan) Kazuki Nojiri	RISE 82	Tokyo, Japan	Decision (Split)	3	3:00
Wins the 2011 RISE Heavyweight Rising Rookies Cup.
2011-06-04	Win	(Japan) Fumihito Okano	RISE 78	Tokyo, Japan	KO	1	2:43
2011-04-17	Win	(Japan) Dai	RISE 76	Tokyo, Japan	KO	2	2:53
Legend: Win Loss Draw/No contest Notes

== See also ==
- List of male mixed martial artists
