= Alberto Mina =

Brazilian mixed martial arts fighter

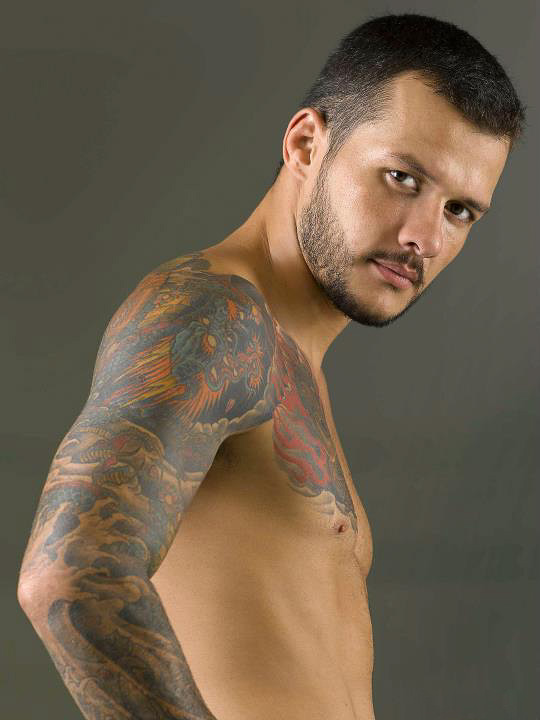
- Born: May 2, 1982 (age 44); Campina Grande, Paraíba, Brazil
- Other names: Soldier of God
- Height: 6 ft 0 in (1.83 m)
- Weight: 170 lb (77 kg; 12 st)
- Division: Welterweight
- Reach: 77 in (196 cm)
- Style: Brazilian Jiu-Jitsu
- Stance: Orthodox
- Fighting out of: Los Angeles, California, United States
- Team: Epic MMA (formerly); Kings MMA (formerly); Hybrid MMA Hong Kong
- Rank: 3rd degree black belt in Brazilian Jiu-Jitsu; 2nd degree black belt in Judo
- Years active: 2005-present

Mixed martial arts record
- Total: 14
- Wins: 13
- By knockout: 6
- By submission: 6
- By decision: 1
- Losses: 1
- By decision: 1

Other information
- Mixed martial arts record from Sherdog

Alberto Mina (born May 2, 1982) is a Brazilian mixed martial artist who competed in the Welterweight division of the Ultimate Fighting Championship (UFC).

== Biography ==
A native of Campina Grande in northeast Brazil, Mina began his career at the age of 5, when his parents decided to make him learn some sport for being very active as a kid. He started training Judo, being taught by an old friend of the family, the master Roberto Fialho. Since a very young age, Alberto started being noticed because of his competitiveness and sense of discipline inside the dojo.

The city and the gym where he was based proved to be a good environment to develop his ability. Campina Grande, has a decorated tradition in martial arts. Mina's sensei, Roberto Fialho, is a direct disciple of the great Ivan Gomes, a man who competed all over the world in the early Vale-Tudo era during the 1950s until the late 1970s with a non-official record of 600 fights with 576 victories and 24 draws, having never lost a fight. Roberto Fialho is a coral belt (red and white belt) in Judo and Black belt in Jiu-Jitsu. He was the coach of a lot of the city's best fighters like the four-time Olympic judoka Edinanci Silva. Fialho himself was a World Black Belt Senior Champion in 2001 and Bronze Medal in 2006.

== Jiu-jitsu and submission career ==
Under the guidance of Fialho, Mina switched to jiu-jitsu in 1997, where he managed to understand the foundations of the sport very well, due to his prior experience in Judo, using his creativity to develop his own style and a fine technique. Mina soon began to be acknowledged in his local scenario, where as a teenager, he was able to compete and win in various Jiu-Jitsu championships.

His competitive soul always led him to learn different features of a lot of different sports to improve his technique in Jiu-Jitsu. As a natural athlete, during his teenager years Mina also practiced and competed in Judo, Swimming, Handball and Volleyball, always looking for ways to improve his athleticism to compete in Jiu-Jitsu. He also made his transition to submission grappling which was one important step for him to begin his career in Mixed Martial Arts.

In 2004, Mina was already an established jiu-jitsu fighter and instructor at Fialho Academy. By that time, he was experiencing submission grappling where he competed and had some of his best performances in fighting. Back then, there was a great rivalry between the fighting gyms in Campina Grande, where Mina's name was acknowledged as one of the best. Mina was then spotted and advised by his friend Jean Silva and finally made his transition to Mixed Martial Arts.

With over 15 years of experience, he is now a 3rd Degree Judo Black Belt and 3rd Degree Jiu-Jitsu Black Belt, representing Draculino Fight Team. Amongst several titles and participations in State, Northeast and North/Northeast Championships, one of his greatest titles was the double gold at the European Urban Gorillaz Submission Championship, where he conquered both welterweight and open class titles in 2006.

He has also won the Asian Open Championship twice, in 2015 and 2016 at Welterweight, and has participated in other events like Abu-Dhabi Pro.

== Mixed martial arts ==
Mina joined the Jean Silva Combat Team in 2005. In MMA where he showcased all his talent by combining resources of the different sports he competed. He made his professional debut in October 2005 in a local event in his hometown called CageFight Nordeste.

He compiled a record of 10–0 interspersed with periods of inactivity, competing for several regional promotions around the world before signing with the UFC in January 2014.

=== Ultimate Fighting Championship ===
Mina was set to make his promotional debut against Zak Cummings on March 1, 2014, at The Ultimate Fighter China Finale. However, at the weigh-ins for the event, Cummings came in eight pounds over the welterweight limit. On the advice of his coaches, Mina would not agree to compete at a catch weight, so the bout was scratched from the event.

Mina was expected to face Sheldon Westcott on August 23, 2014, at UFC Fight Night 48. However, in the days leading up to the event, Westcott pulled out of the bout citing an injury and was replaced by Shinsho Anzai. He won the fight via TKO in the first round and was awarded a Performance of the Night bonus.

Mina returned to face Yoshihiro Akiyama on November 28, 2015, at UFC Fight Night 79. He won the back-and-forth fight via split decision.

Mina next faced Mike Pyle on July 7, 2016, at UFC Fight Night 90. He won via knockout in the second round.

Mina faced Ramazan Emeev on May 12, 2018, at UFC 224. He lost the fight via unanimous decision.

Mina was expected to face Warlley Alves on May 11, 2019, at UFC 237. However just days after the announcement of the pairing leaked, Mina indicated that he had never agreed to the fight and had not signed a bout agreement.

Since his last bout, he was released from the UFC.

== Championships and accomplishments ==
- Ultimate Fighting Championship
  - Performance of the Night (One time) vs. Shinsho Anzai

== Mixed martial arts record ==
Professional record breakdown
14 matches	13 wins	1 loss
By knockout	6	0
By submission	6	0
By decision	1	1

Res.	Record	Opponent	Method	Event	Date	Round	Time	Location	Notes
Loss	13–1	Ramazan Emeev	Decision (unanimous)	UFC 224	May 12, 2018	3	5:00	Rio de Janeiro, Brazil	
Win	13–0	Mike Pyle	KO (flying knee and punches)	UFC Fight Night: dos Anjos vs. Alvarez	July 7, 2016	2	1:17	Las Vegas, Nevada, United States	
Win	12–0	Yoshihiro Akiyama	Decision (split)	UFC Fight Night: Henderson vs. Masvidal	November 28, 2015	3	5:00	Seoul, South Korea	
Win	11–0	Shinsho Anzai	TKO (punches)	UFC Fight Night: Bisping vs. Le	August 23, 2014	1	4:17	Macau, SAR, China	Performance of the Night.
Win	10–0	Glenn Sparv	TKO (knees and punches)	Rebel FC 1	December 21, 2013	1	2:44	Kallang, Singapore	
Win	9–0	Boy Eggels	Submission (armbar)	UFG 1	August 7, 2011	1	3:11	Kallithea, Greece	
Win	8–0	Dean Amasinger	TKO (punches)	UCMMA 10	February 6, 2010	3	2:17	London, England	
Win	7–0	Edgelson Lua	Submission (armbar)	UCMMA 10	October 24, 2009	1	3:26	London, England	
Win	6–0	Steven Elliott	Submission (rear-naked choke)	Cage Rage 28	September 20, 2008	1	2:55	London, England	
Win	5–0	Michel Ribeiro	TKO (retirement)	MCVT	December 28, 2006	3	1:31	João Pessoa, Brazil	
Win	4–0	Jose Enrique Anton	Submission (rear-naked choke)	ZTFN 2	June 25, 2006	1	1:34	London, England	
Win	3–0	Mickael Slomczynski	Submission (kimura)	Intense Fighting 3	April 1, 2006	1	3:55	Peterborough, England	
Win	2–0	Michel Ribeiro	TKO (punches)	Instigação Combat 1	October 5, 2005	1	3:29	Campina Grande, Brazil	
Win	1–0	Jeferson Fibiru	Submission (armbar)	Cage Fight Nordeste	May 31, 2005	1	3:37	Campina Grande, Brazil	

== See also ==
- List of current UFC fighters
- List of male mixed martial artists
