= Li Jingliang =

Chinese mixed martial arts fighter

- Born: Li Jingliang; March 20, 1988 (age 38); Tacheng, Xinjiang, China
- Native name: 李景亮
- Other names: The Leech
- Height: 6 ft 0 in (183 cm)
- Weight: 170 lb (77 kg; 12 st)
- Division: Welterweight
- Reach: 72 in (183 cm)
- Style: Sanda, Shuai Jiao
- Fighting out of: Beijing, China
- Team: China Top Team; Team Alpha Male; Kill Cliff FC (2022-present)
- Trainer: Zhang Tiequan
- Rank: Black belt in Brazilian Jiu-Jitsu
- Years active: 2007–present

Mixed martial arts record
- Total: 28
- Wins: 19
- By knockout: 10
- By submission: 4
- By decision: 5
- Losses: 9
- By knockout: 1
- By submission: 2
- By decision: 6

Other information
- Mixed martial arts record from Sherdog

Li Jingliang (Chinese: 李景亮; pinyin: Lǐ Jǐngliàng; born March 20, 1988) is a Chinese mixed martial artist who competed in the Welterweight division of the Ultimate Fighting Championship.

== Background ==
Originally from a small town near Tacheng in the Xinjiang UAR of Northwest China, Li competed in Chinese wrestling and trained in Sanda before moving to Beijing in 2008 in order to pursue a career in professional mixed martial arts. Li began training under the tutelage of former UFC Lightweight Zhang Tiequan.

== Mixed martial arts career ==
=== Early career ===
Li made his professional debut in 2007, winning via submission due to punches in the second round. He would go on to compile a record of 8–2, capturing the Legend FC Welterweight Championship in the process, before being granted his release and signed by the UFC.

=== Ultimate Fighting Championship ===
Li made his promotional debut on May 24, 2014, at UFC 173 against David Michaud, who had an undefeated record of 7–0. Li defeated Michaud via split decision, giving Michaud the first loss of his career.

Li faced Nordine Taleb on October 4, 2014, at UFC Fight Night 54. Li was able to take Taleb down multiple times throughout the fight and even successfully land significantly more strikes as Taleb was content to counter strike throughout the bout. In a surprising result, Taleb was given the victory by split decision.

Li was expected to face Roger Zapata on May 16, 2015, at UFC Fight Night 66. However, on April 18, it was announced that Zapata was pulled from the fight due to undisclosed reasons and replaced by Brazilian fighter Dhiego Lima. Li won the fight via knockout in the first round.

Li was expected to face Kiichi Kunimoto on September 27, 2015, at UFC Fight Night 75. However, Kunimoto pulled out of the fight in late August citing injury and was replaced by returning Japanese veteran Keita Nakamura. After dominating the first two rounds, Li lost the fight via technical submission in the third round.

Li faced Anton Zafir on July 8, 2016, at The Ultimate Fighter 23 Finale. Li defeated Zafir via knockout in the first round.

Li was expected to face Chad Laprise on December 10, 2016, at UFC 206. However, Laprise pulled out of the fight on November 16 citing an undisclosed injury. As a result, Li was pulled from the card entirely and rescheduled to a future event.

Li was expected to face Yancy Medeiros on January 28, 2017, at UFC on Fox 23. However, in early January, Medeiros pulled out for undisclosed reasons and was replaced by Bobby Nash. Li defeated Nash via knockout in the second round.

Li faced Frank Camacho on June 17, 2017, at UFC Fight Night 111. He won the fight via unanimous decision. This win earned Li his second Fight of the Night bonus award.

Li faced Zak Ottow on November 25, 2017, at UFC Fight Night 122. He won the fight via TKO in the first round. The win also earned Li his first Performance of the Night bonus award.

Li faced Jake Matthews on February 11, 2018, at UFC 221. He lost the fight via unanimous decision and received criticism for his eye gouge of Matthews. This fight earned him the Fight of the Night bonus.

Li faced Daichi Abe on June 23, 2018, at UFC Fight Night 132. He won the fight via unanimous decision.

Li was scheduled to face Elizeu Zaleski dos Santos on November 24, 2018, at UFC Fight Night 141. However, on October 27, 2018, it was reported that Zaleski withdrew from the bout due to a partial ligament tear in his right knee, and he is replaced by David Zawada. He won the fight via technical knockout in round three.

Li was expected to face Alex Oliveira on April 27, 2019, at UFC on ESPN 3. However, on March 24, 2019, it was report Li pulled from the bout, citing injury.

Li was expected to be in a pairing with Elizeu Zaleski dos Santos that was rescheduled and took place on August 31, 2019, at UFC Fight Night 157. Li won the fight via technical knockout in round three. The win earned Li his third Performance of the Night bonus award.

Li faced Neil Magny on March 7, 2020, at UFC 248. He lost the fight by unanimous decision.

Li was scheduled to face Dwight Grant on December 12, 2020, at UFC 256. However, on December 8, 2020, Grant tested positive for COVID-19 during fight week and had to pull out. A replacement opponent for Li wasn't able to be found, and therefore Li was removed from the event.

Li faced Santiago Ponzinibbio, replacing Muslim Salikhov, on January 16, 2021, at UFC on ABC 1. He won the fight via first-round knockout. This win earned him the Performance of the Night award.

Li faced Khamzat Chimaev on October 30, 2021, at UFC 267. He lost the bout after getting choked unconscious via rear-naked choke in the first round.

Li faced Muslim Salikhov on July 16, 2022, at UFC on ABC 3. He won the fight via TKO in the second round. This win earned him Performance of the Night bonus award.

Li was scheduled to face Tony Ferguson on September 10, 2022, at UFC 279. However, due to Khamzat Chimaev missing weight, Li faced Daniel Rodriguez who was originally scheduled to face Kevin Holland in a catchweight bout. He lost the back-and-forth fight via split decision. 21 out of 23 media scores gave it to Li.

Li was scheduled to face Michael Chiesa on April 8, 2023, at UFC 287. However, Li pulled out of the bout due to a spine injury.

Li faced Carlos Prates on August 17, 2024 at UFC 305. He lost the fight by knockout in the second round, which was the first knockout loss in his career.

== Personal life ==
Li and his wife have a daughter (born 2015) and a son (born 2020).

== Championships and accomplishments ==
=== Mixed Martial Arts ===
- Legend Fighting Championship
  - Legend FC Welterweight Championship (One time)
- Ultimate Fighting Championship
  - Fight of the Night (Two times) vs Frank Camacho and Jake Matthews
  - Performance of the Night (Five times) vs. Zak Ottow, David Zawada, Elizeu Zaleski dos Santos, Santiago Ponzinibbio and Muslim Salikhov
  - Tied (Vicente Luque, Thiago Alves & Neil Magny) for second most knockouts in UFC Welterweight division history (8) (behind Matt Brown)
  - Tied (Josh Koscheck) for sixth most finishes in UFC Welterweight division history (8)

=== Brazilian jiu-jitsu ===
- China Open Jiu-jitsu Tournament
  - 2013 1st place – Absolute (Purple Belt)
  - 2013 1st place – 92 kg (Purple Belt)

== Mixed martial arts record ==
Professional record breakdown
28 matches	19 wins	9 losses
By knockout	10	1
By submission	4	2
By decision	5	6

Res.	Record	Opponent	Method	Event	Date	Round	Time	Location	Notes
Loss	19–9	Carlos Prates	KO (punches)	UFC 305	August 18, 2024	2	4:02	Perth, Australia	
Loss	19–8	Daniel Rodriguez	Decision (split)	UFC 279	September 10, 2022	3	5:00	Las Vegas, Nevada, United States	Catchweight (180 lb) bout.
Win	19–7	Muslim Salikhov	TKO (punches and elbows)	UFC on ABC: Ortega vs. Rodríguez	July 16, 2022	2	4:38	Elmont, New York, United States	Performance of the Night.
Loss	18–7	Khamzat Chimaev	Technical Submission (rear-naked choke)	UFC 267	October 30, 2021	1	3:16	Abu Dhabi, United Arab Emirates	
Win	18–6	Santiago Ponzinibbio	KO (punch)	UFC on ABC: Holloway vs. Kattar	January 16, 2021	1	4:25	Abu Dhabi, United Arab Emirates	Performance of the Night.
Loss	17–6	Neil Magny	Decision (unanimous)	UFC 248	March 7, 2020	3	5:00	Las Vegas, Nevada, United States	
Win	17–5	Elizeu Zaleski dos Santos	TKO (punches)	UFC Fight Night: Andrade vs. Zhang	August 31, 2019	3	4:51	Shenzhen, China	Performance of the Night.
Win	16–5	David Zawada	KO (body kick)	UFC Fight Night: Blaydes vs. Ngannou 2	November 24, 2018	3	4:07	Beijing, China	Performance of the Night.
Win	15–5	Daichi Abe	Decision (unanimous)	UFC Fight Night: Cowboy vs. Edwards	June 23, 2018	3	5:00	Kallang, Singapore	
Loss	14–5	Jake Matthews	Decision (unanimous)	UFC 221	February 11, 2018	3	5:00	Perth, Australia	Fight of the Night.
Win	14–4	Zak Ottow	TKO (punches)	UFC Fight Night: Bisping vs. Gastelum	November 25, 2017	1	2:57	Shanghai, China	Performance of the Night.
Win	13–4	Frank Camacho	Decision (unanimous)	UFC Fight Night: Holm vs. Correia	June 17, 2017	3	5:00	Kallang, Singapore	Fight of the Night.
Win	12–4	Bobby Nash	KO (punches)	UFC on Fox: Shevchenko vs. Peña	January 28, 2017	2	4:45	Denver, Colorado, United States	
Win	11–4	Anton Zafir	KO (punches)	The Ultimate Fighter: Team Joanna vs. Team Cláudia Finale	July 8, 2016	1	2:46	Las Vegas, Nevada, United States	
Loss	10–4	Keita Nakamura	Technical Submission (standing rear-naked choke)	UFC Fight Night: Barnett vs. Nelson	September 27, 2015	3	2:17	Saitama, Japan	
Win	10–3	Dhiego Lima	KO (punches)	UFC Fight Night: Edgar vs. Faber	May 16, 2015	1	1:25	Pasay, Philippines	
Loss	9–3	Nordine Taleb	Decision (split)	UFC Fight Night: MacDonald vs. Saffiedine	October 4, 2014	3	5:00	Halifax, Nova Scotia, Canada	
Win	9–2	David Michaud	Decision (split)	UFC 173	May 24, 2014	3	5:00	Las Vegas, Nevada, United States	
Win	8–2	Luke Jumeau	Submission (guillotine choke)	Legend FC 11	April 27, 2013	3	3:38	Kuala Lumpur, Malaysia	Won the Legend FC Welterweight Championship.
Win	7–2	Dan Pauling	Decision (unanimous)	Legend FC 9	June 16, 2012	3	5:00	Macau	
Loss	6–2	Myung Ho Bae	Decision (unanimous)	Legend FC 7	February 11, 2012	3	5:00	Macau	For the Legend FC Welterweight Championship.
Win	6–1	Alex Niu	Decision (unanimous)	Legend FC 5	July 16, 2011	3	5:00	Hong Kong	
Win	5–1	Tony Rossini	Technical Submission (guillotine choke)	Legend FC 4	January 27, 2011	2	1:11	Hong Kong	
Win	4–1	Andrei Liu	TKO (punches)	Legend FC 3	September 24, 2010	1	3:43	Hong Kong	
Loss	3–1	Pat Crawley	Decision (unanimous)	Legend FC 2	June 24, 2010	3	5:00	Hong Kong	
Win	3–0	Yun Tao Gong	Submission (guillotine choke)	AOW 15: Ueyama vs. Aohailin	November 28, 2009	1	5:29	Beijing, China	
Win	2–0	Liu Jin Wen	Submission (guillotine choke)	Ultimate Martial Arts Combat	April 18, 2009	1	3:05	Beijing, China	
Win	1–0	Makhach Gadzhiev	TKO (submission to punches)	AOW 8: Worlds Collide	September 22, 2007	2	1:02	Beijing, China	

== See also ==
- List of male mixed martial artists
