= UFC Fight Night: Barnett vs. Nelson =

UFC mixed martial arts event in 2015

- The poster for UFC Fight Night: Barnett vs. Nelson
- Promotion: Ultimate Fighting Championship
- Date: September 27, 2015
- Venue: Saitama Super Arena
- City: Saitama, Japan
- Attendance: 10,137

Event chronology
UFC 191: Johnson vs. Dodson 2	UFC Fight Night: Barnett vs. Nelson	UFC 192: Cormier vs. Gustafsson

UFC Fight Night: Barnett vs. Nelson (also known as UFC Fight Night 75) was a mixed martial arts event held on September 27, 2015, at Saitama Super Arena in Saitama, Japan.

== Background ==
The event was the fourth that the organization has hosted in Saitama, following UFC 144 in February 2012, UFC on Fuel TV: Silva vs. Stann in March 2013, and UFC Fight Night: Hunt vs. Nelson in September 2014.

The event was headlined by a heavyweight bout between former UFC Heavyweight champion Josh Barnett and The Ultimate Fighter 10 heavyweight winner Roy Nelson. Both men had coached opposite each other on the show Road to UFC: Japan.

The featherweight final of Road to UFC: Japan, a new UFC reality series that was held in conjunction with the event, was featured on the card. The bout ended in a split draw, a first for the reality show series finale fights. During the show, the UFC announced that as a result of the draw both fighters would receive six-figure UFC contracts.

Roan Carneiro was expected to face Gegard Mousasi at this event. However, Carneiro was forced to pull out due to injury and was replaced by Uriah Hall.

Kiichi Kunimoto was expected to face Li Jingliang at this event. However, Kunimoto pulled out of the fight citing injury and was replaced by returning veteran Keita Nakamura.

A bout between Matt Hobar and Norifumi Yamamoto was expected to take place at this event. However, both fighters sustained injuries and were forced to pull out of the fight.

== Results ==
Main Card (Fox Sports 1)
Weight class				Method	Round	Time	Notes
Heavyweight	Josh Barnett	def.	Roy Nelson	Decision (unanimous) (48–47, 48–47, 50–45)	5	5:00
Middleweight	Uriah Hall	def.	Gegard Mousasi	TKO (flying knee and punches)	2	0:25
Flyweight	Kyoji Horiguchi	def.	Chico Camus	Decision (unanimous) (30–27, 30–27, 30–27)	3	5:00
Bantamweight	Takeya Mizugaki	def.	George Roop	Decision (unanimous) (29–28, 29–28, 29–28)	3	5:00
Featherweight	Diego Brandao	def.	Katsunori Kikuno	TKO (punches)	1	0:28
Featherweight	Mizuto Hirota	vs.	Teruto Ishihara	Draw (split) (28–29, 29–28, 29–29)	3	5:00	(Note: Road to UFC: Japan Featherweight Final)
Preliminary Card (Fox Sports 2)
Welterweight	Keita Nakamura	def.	Li Jingliang	Technical Submission (standing rear-naked choke)	3	2:17
Lightweight	Nick Hein	def.	Yusuke Kasuya	Decision (unanimous) (30–27, 29–28, 29–28)	3	5:00
Lightweight	Kajan Johnson	def.	Naoyuki Kotani	Decision (unanimous) (29–28, 29–28, 30–27)	3	5:00
Welterweight	Shinsho Anzai	def.	Roger Zapata	TKO (hand injury)	3	0:47

== Bonus awards ==
The following fighters were awarded $50,000 bonuses:

- Fight of the Night: None awarded
- Performance of the Night: Josh Barnett, Uriah Hall, Diego Brandao and Keita Nakamura

== See also ==
- List of UFC events
- 2015 in UFC
