= Jordan Parsons =

American mixed martial arts (MMA) fighter

- Parsons in October 2015
- Born: August 26, 1990; Fargo, North Dakota, U.S.
- Died: May 4, 2016 (aged 25); Delray Beach, Florida, U.S. Auto accident
- Other names: Pretty Boy
- Height: 5 ft 9 in (1.75 m)
- Weight: 145 lb (66 kg; 10.4 st)
- Division: Featherweight
- Reach: 71.0 in (180 cm)
- Fighting out of: Berrien Springs, Michigan, U.S.
- Team: Minnesota Martial Arts Academy 2010-2013; Alliance MMA; Blackzilians
- Years active: 2010–2016

Mixed martial arts record
- Total: 13
- Wins: 11
- By knockout: 3
- By submission: 3
- By decision: 5
- Losses: 2
- By knockout: 1
- By decision: 1

Other information
- Mixed martial arts record from Sherdog

Jordan Parsons (August 26, 1990 – May 4, 2016) was an American mixed martial artist who formerly competed in Bellator's featherweight division. A professional competitor since 2010, Parsons had also previously competed for the Championship Fighting Alliance.

== Mixed martial arts career ==
=== Early career ===
Parsons turned professional in October 2010 after amassing a 3–0 record as an amateur. He went undefeated in his first four bouts before signing with the Championship Fighting Alliance.

=== Championship Fighting Alliance ===
Parsons made his CFA debut against James Polodna at CFA 3: Howard vs. Olson on October 9, 2011. He won the fight via unanimous decision.

Parsons next faced James Cianci at CFA 4: Izquierdo vs. Cenoble on December 17, 2011, in the semifinal round of the promotions undefeated featherweight tournament. He won the fight via unanimous decision to secure his place in the finals.

Parsons faced off against Danny Chavez in the finals, which took place at CFA 5: Chavez vs. Parsons on February 24, 2012, for the featherweight title. He won the fight via unanimous decision after five rounds to become the new CFA Featherweight Champion.

In his first defense, Parsons faced Lazar Stojadinovic at CFA 7: Never Give Up on June 30, 2012, and lost via knockout in the first round, the first loss of his career.

=== Driller Promotions ===
Following a year layoff, Parsons moved to the lightweight division and defeated Derek Getzel via unanimous decision at Driller Promotions / SEG: Havoc at High Five 2 on June 29, 2013.

Parsons fought and defeated Damien Hill via first-round submission to become the Driller Promotions Lightweight Champion on September 14, 2013, at Driller Promotions / SEG: Caged Chaos at Canterbury Park 4.

=== Bellator MMA ===
Parsons made his Bellator debut against Tim Bazer on April 18, 2014, at Bellator 117. He won the fight via knockout, just four seconds into the second round. During the bout, Parsons tore his meniscus, which sidelined him until 2015.

After signing a six-fight deal with the promotion, Parsons returned to featherweight and faced fellow prospect Julio Cesar, who was undefeated with a record of 30–0, at Bellator 137 on May 15, 2015. Parsons defeated Cesar via submission due to an arm-triangle choke in the third round, handing the Brazilian his first loss.

Parsons then faced Bubba Jenkins at Bellator 146 on November 20, 2015. After surviving a head kick that wobbled and knocked him down, he lost the fight via split decision.

Parsons was scheduled to face Adam Piccolotti at Bellator 154 on May 14, 2016. However, Parsons died as a result of a hit-and-run incident that occurred on May 1.

== Personal life ==
Jordan Parsons was born on August 26, 1990, in Fargo, North Dakota. His family then moved to the poverty-stricken town of Covert, Michigan when he was 8 years old. Living in Covert, Parsons was exposed to violence at a very young age with one of his classmates being a victim of sexual assault. It was then that Parsons realized he needed to learn to defend himself. Parsons was an over-weight child with a father that had a rare skin condition- both elements that made him a target for being bullied on a regular basis.

Jordan's parents separated when Jordan was just 13 years old, and his mother moved him to Berrien Springs, Michigan. It was here that Parsons began to take an interest in working out and wrestling, qualifying for the state tournament twice for Berrien Springs High. At the age of 15, Parsons broke out of his shell when a group of older kids cornered him and a friend at the beach. Parsons was forced to defend himself against the odds and quickly learned that he was able to do so very well, coming out of the altercation unscathed.

Jordan's first fight in a ring was when he was only 17 years old, after training at a local MMA gym for just a month. After winning the fight quickly, he developed a passion for the sport. Parsons had found his calling, resulting in progressively moving up the ranks. It began with traveling across the country to eventually win the belt in the CFA. Later in his career, Parsons trained with some of the best fighters and coaches in the world. This led Jordan to signing with Bellator. He trained at Jaco Hybrid with The Blackzilians, one of the world's most elite group of MMA athletes

== Death ==
Parsons was hit by the driver of a Range Rover in Delray Beach, Florida early in the morning of May 1, 2016, while crossing a street. As a result, he had the bottom half of his right leg amputated. He died on May 4, 2016, as a result of his injuries. On May 7, 28-year-old Dennis Wright of Boca Raton was charged with leaving the scene of a crash causing death, tampering with evidence and driving with a suspended license as a habitual offender, his sixth suspension. Wright tried to take the damaged SUV to a body shop, but the body shop owner refused to repair the SUV. According to the unnamed witnesses cited in the report, the body shop owner knew the SUV had been involved in the crash that killed Jordan Parsons. That led to Wright storing the SUV at Security Storage Facility at 189 W. Linton Blvd, police said.

In October 2016, it was announced that a postmortem analysis of Parsons' brain had revealed the degenerative brain disease Chronic traumatic encephalopathy (CTE). Parsons was the first fighter in the multibillion-dollar MMA industry to be publicly identified as having been diagnosed with CTE, Gary Goodridge still living was diagnosed with a related neurological disorder associated with head trauma. CTE can only be diagnosed after death with a brain autopsy.

== Championships and accomplishments ==
=== Mixed martial arts ===
- Championship Fighting Alliance
  - CFA Featherweight Championship (one time)
  - CFA featherweight tournament winner
- Driller Promotions
  - Driller Promotions Lightweight Championship (one time)

== Mixed martial arts record ==
Professional record breakdown
| 13 matches | 11 wins | 2 losses |
| By knockout | 3 | 1 |
| By submission | 3 | 0 |
| By decision | 5 | 1 |

| Res. | Record | Opponent | Method | Event | Date | Round | Time | Location | Notes |
|---|---|---|---|---|---|---|---|---|---|
| Loss | 11–2 | Bubba Jenkins | Decision (split) | Bellator 146 | November 20, 2015 | 3 | 5:00 | Thackerville, Oklahoma, United States | |
| Win | 11–1 | Julio Cesar | Submission (arm-triangle choke) | Bellator 137 | May 15, 2015 | 3 | 4:09 | Temecula, California, United States | Return to Featherweight. |
| Win | 10–1 | Tim Bazer | KO (punches) | Bellator 117 | April 18, 2014 | 2 | 0:04 | Council Bluffs, Iowa, United States | |
| Win | 9–1 | Damien Hill | Submission (guillotine choke) | Driller Promotions / SEG: Caged Chaos at Canterbury Park 4 | September 14, 2013 | 1 | 1:10 | Shakopee, Minnesota, United States | Won Driller Promotions Lightweight Championship. |
| Win | 8–1 | Derek Getzel | Decision (unanimous) | Driller Promotions / SEG: Havoc at High Five 2 | June 29, 2013 | 3 | 5:00 | Burnsville, Minnesota, United States | Moved to Lightweight. |
| Loss | 7–1 | Lazar Stojadinovic | KO (punch) | CFA 7: Never Give Up | June 30, 2012 | 1 | 1:11 | Coral Gables, Florida, United States | Lost CFA Featherweight Championship. |
| Win | 7–0 | Danny Chavez | Decision (unanimous) | CFA 5: Chavez vs. Parsons | February 24, 2012 | 5 | 5:00 | Coral Gables, Florida, United States | CFA Undefeated Featherweight Tournament Final; Won CFA Featherweight Championship. |
| Win | 6–0 | James Cianci | Decision (unanimous) | CFA 4: Izquierdo vs. Cenoble | December 17, 2011 | 3 | 5:00 | Coral Gables, Florida, United States | CFA Undefeated Featherweight Tournament Semifinal. |
| Win | 5–0 | James Polodna | Decision (unanimous) | CFA 3: Howard vs. Olson | October 9, 2011 | 3 | 5:00 | Miami, Florida, United States | |
| Win | 4–0 | Bobby Ferrier | Submission (guillotine choke) | EB: Beatdown at 4 Bears 9 | July 22, 2011 | 1 | 1:39 | New Town, North Dakota, United States | |
| Win | 3–0 | Robert Couillard | Decision (unanimous) | Combat USA: Country USA 1 | June 25, 2011 | 3 | 5:00 | Oshkosh, Wisconsin, United States | |
| Win | 2–0 | Bruce Reis | TKO (punches) | EB: Beatdown at 4 Bears 7 | November 27, 2010 | 1 | 2:34 | New Town, North Dakota, United States | |
| Win | 1–0 | Derek Abram | TKO (punches) | Impact Fighting Championship: Inception | October 23, 2010 | 1 | 2:59 | Bismarck, North Dakota, United States | |
