= Nate Landwehr =

American mixed martial arts fighter

- Born: Nathan Wade Landwehr; June 7, 1988 (age 38); Clarksville, Tennessee, U.S.
- Other names: The Train
- Height: 5 ft 9 in (1.75 m)
- Weight: 145 lb (66 kg; 10 st 5 lb)
- Division: Featherweight
- Reach: 72 in (183 cm)
- Fighting out of: Clarksville, Tennessee, U.S.
- Team: SSF Submission Academy (2012–present); Wildside Fitness; MMA Masters (2021–present)
- Years active: 2012–present

Mixed martial arts record
- Total: 27
- Wins: 18
- By knockout: 9
- By submission: 2
- By decision: 7
- Losses: 9
- By knockout: 6
- By submission: 1
- By decision: 2

Other information
- Mixed martial arts record from Sherdog

Nathan Wade Landwehr (born June 7, 1988) is an American mixed martial artist who competes in the Featherweight division of the Ultimate Fighting Championship. A professional mixed martial artist since 2012, he is also a former M-1 Global Featherweight Champion.

== Background ==
Landwehr was born and grew up in Tennessee and attended Rossview High School. He played football from the third grade until the end of high school. He also wrestled and ran track throughout high school. After high school, Landwehr attended Highland Community College for two academic years, where he ran track with scholarship.

== Mixed martial arts career ==
=== Early career ===
Landwehr racked up a record of 8–2 on the stateside circuit before signing with M-1 Global.

=== M-1 Global ===
Landwehr made his promotional debut against Mikhail Korobkov at M-1 Challenge 83 - Ragozin vs. Halsey on September 23, 2017. He won the fight via second-round knockout.

He made his sophomore appearance in M-1 against Viktor Kolesnik at M-1 Challenge 85: Ismagulov vs. Matias on November 10, 2017. He won the fight via split decision.

==== M-1 Global Featherweight Championship ====
Landwehr was scheduled to challenge Khamzat Dalgiev for the M-1 Global Featherweight Championship at M-1 Challenge 91 - Swain vs. Nuertiebieke on May 12, 2018. However, the event was cancelled for unknown reason. The bout was later rebooked to take place at M-1 Challenge 95 - Battle in the Mountains 7 on July 21, 2018. Landwehr captured the championship via second-round technical knockout.

In his second title defense, Landwehr faced Andrey Lezhnev on December 15, 2018, at M-1 Challenge 100. He won the spectacular fight by a third round TKO.

In his third defense, Landwehr faced Viktor Kolesnik on June 28, 2019, at M-1 Challenge 102. He won the fight via unanimous decision.

=== Ultimate Fighting Championship ===
Nate made his UFC debut against fellow newcomer Herbert Burns at UFC Fight Night 166 on January 25, 2020. He lost the fight by knockout in the first round via a knee from the clinch.

Landwehr faced Darren Elkins on May 16, 2020, at UFC on ESPN 8. He won the fight via unanimous decision.

Landwehr was scheduled to face Movsar Evloev on December 5, 2020, at UFC on ESPN 19. However, hours before the start, it was cancelled after Movsar tested positive for COVID-19.

Landwehr faced Julian Erosa on February 20, 2021, at UFC Fight Night 185. He lost the fight via technical knockout in round one.

Landwehr was scheduled to face Makwan Amirkhani on June 5, 2021, at UFC Fight Night 185. However, Landwehr was pulled from the event due to injury and was replaced by Kamuela Kirk.

Landwehr faced Ľudovít Klein on October 16, 2021, at UFC Fight Night 195. He won the fight via a submission in round three. This win earned him the Performance of the Night award.

Landwehr was scheduled to face Lerone Murphy on March 26, 2022, at UFC on ESPN 33. However, Murphy withdrew from the bout for undisclosed reasons and he was replaced by David Onama. In turn, Landwehr had to pull out of the bout and the bout was scrapped.

Landwehr was scheduled to face Zubaira Tukhugov on August 6, 2022, at UFC on ESPN 40. However, Tukhugov withdraw due to experiencing difficulties securing a visa issues and was replaced by David Onama at UFC on ESPN 41 just a week after. Landwehr won the fight via majority decision. This fight earned him the Fight of the Night award.

Landwehr was scheduled to face Alex Caceres on March 25, 2023, at UFC on ESPN 43. However, Caceres withdrew due to an undisclosed reason and was replaced by Austin Lingo. Landwehr won the bout via rear-naked choke at the end of the second round. This win earned him the Performance of the Night award.

Landwehr faced Dan Ige on June 10, 2023, at UFC 289. He lost the bout via unanimous decision.

Landwehr was scheduled to face Pat Sabatini on March 30, 2024, at UFC on ESPN 54. However, Sabatini withdrew for unknown reasons and was replaced by Jamall Emmers. Landwehr won the fight via knockout in round one. This win earned him the Performance of the Night bonus.

Landwehr was briefly scheduled to face Austin Hubbard on October 5, 2024 at UFC 307. However, Landwehr withdrew from the bout for unknown reasons.

Landwehr faced Choi Doo-ho on December 7, 2024 at UFC 310. He lost the fight by technical knockout via ground punches and elbows in the third round.

Landwehr faced Morgan Charrière on July 12, 2025 at UFC on ESPN 70. He lost the fight by knockout in the third round. This fight earned him another Fight of the Night award.

Landwehr faced Cub Swanson on April 11, 2026 at UFC 327. He lost the fight by technical knockout in the first round.

In a lightweight bout, Landwehr faced Mandel Nallo on October 17, 2026 at UFC Fight Night 291. He lost the fight by technical knockout via leg kicks and punches in the second round.

== Championships and accomplishments ==
=== Mixed martial arts ===
- Ultimate Fighting Championship
  - Performance of the Night (Three times) vs. Ľudovít Klein, Austin Lingo and Jamall Emmers
  - Fight of the Night (Two times) vs. David Onama and Morgan Charrière
- M-1 Global
  - M-1 Global Featherweight Championship (One time; former)
    - Two successful title defenses
- 3FC
  - 3FC Featherweight Championship (One time; former)

== Mixed martial arts record ==
Professional record breakdown
27 matches	18 wins	9 losses
By knockout	9	6
By submission	2	1
By decision	7	2

Res.	Record	Opponent	Method	Event	Date	Round	Time	Location	Notes
Loss	18–9	Mandel Nallo	TKO (leg kick and punches)	UFC Fight Night: Buckley vs. Malott	October 17, 2026	2	0:47	Edmonton, Alberta, Canada	Lightweight debut.
Loss	18–8	Cub Swanson	TKO (punches)	UFC 327	April 11, 2026	1	4:06	Miami, Florida, United States	
Loss	18–7	Morgan Charrière	KO (punches)	UFC on ESPN: Lewis vs. Teixeira	July 12, 2025	3	0:27	Nashville, Tennessee, United States	Fight of the Night.
Loss	18–6	Choi Doo-ho	TKO (elbows)	UFC 310	December 7, 2024	3	3:21	Las Vegas, Nevada, United States	
Win	18–5	Jamall Emmers	KO (punches)	UFC on ESPN: Blanchfield vs. Fiorot	March 30, 2024	1	4:43	Atlantic City, New Jersey, United States	Performance of the Night.
Loss	17–5	Dan Ige	Decision (unanimous)	UFC 289	June 10, 2023	3	5:00	Vancouver, British Columbia, Canada	
Win	17–4	Austin Lingo	Submission (rear-naked choke)	UFC on ESPN: Vera vs. Sandhagen	March 25, 2023	2	4:11	San Antonio, Texas, United States	Performance of the Night.
Win	16–4	David Onama	Decision (majority)	UFC on ESPN: Vera vs. Cruz	August 13, 2022	3	5:00	San Diego, California, United States	Fight of the Night.
Win	15–4	Ľudovít Klein	Submission (anaconda choke)	UFC Fight Night: Ladd vs. Dumont	October 16, 2021	3	2:22	Las Vegas, Nevada, United States	Performance of the Night.
Loss	14–4	Julian Erosa	TKO (flying knee)	UFC Fight Night: Blaydes vs. Lewis	February 20, 2021	1	0:56	Las Vegas, Nevada, United States	
Win	14–3	Darren Elkins	Decision (unanimous)	UFC on ESPN: Overeem vs. Harris	May 16, 2020	3	5:00	Jacksonville, Florida, United States	
Loss	13–3	Herbert Burns	KO (knee)	UFC Fight Night: Blaydes vs. dos Santos	January 25, 2020	1	2:43	Raleigh, North Carolina, United States	
Win	13–2	Viktor Kolesnik	Decision (unanimous)	M-1 Challenge 102	June 28, 2019	5	5:00	Astana, Kazakhstan	Defended the M-1 Global Featherweight Championship.
Win	12–2	Andrey Lezhnev	TKO (punches)	M-1 Challenge 100	December 15, 2018	3	3:10	Atyrau, Kazakhstan	Defended the M-1 Global Featherweight Championship.
Win	11–2	Khamzat Dalgiev	TKO (punches)	M-1 Challenge 95	July 21, 2018	2	4:35	Nazran, Russia	Won the M-1 Global Featherweight Championship.
Win	10–2	Viktor Kolesnik	Decision (split)	M-1 Challenge 85	November 10, 2017	3	5:00	Moscow, Russia	
Win	9–2	Mikhail Korobkov	KO (punch)	M-1 Challenge 83	September 23, 2017	2	1:31	Kazan, Russia	
Win	8–2	Solon Staley	Decision (unanimous)	A&A Fight Time Promotions: November to Remember	November 5, 2016	3	5:00	Clarksville, Tennessee, United States	
Win	7–2	Diego Saraiva	TKO (punches)	A&A Fight Time Promotions: A Night of Explosions	March 12, 2016	1	4:47	Clarksville, Tennessee, United States	
Loss	6–2	Mark Cherico	Submission (rear-naked choke)	Gladiators of the Cage 19	April 11, 2015	2	1:34	Cheswick, Pennsylvania, United States	For the vacant GOTC Featherweight Championship.
Win	6–1	Anthony Jones	TKO (punches)	State Line Promotions: BMF Invitational 6	February 15, 2015	2	3:03	Clarksville, Tennessee, United States	
Win	5–1	Justin Steave	Decision (unanimous)	Gladiators of the Cage 15	January 24, 2015	3	5:00	Williamsport, Pennsylvania, United States	
Win	4–1	Adam Townsend	Decision (split)	3FC 20	February 1, 2014	5	5:00	Pigeon Forge, Tennessee, United States	Won the vacant 3FC Featherweight Championship.
Win	3–1	Keith Richardson	KO (punch)	XFC 26	October 18, 2013	1	4:43	Nashville, Tennessee, United States	
Loss	2–1	D'Juan Owens	Decision (unanimous)	XFC 22	February 22, 2013	3	5:00	Charlotte, North Carolina, United States	
Win	2–0	Chris Wright	TKO (punches)	XFC 20	September 28, 2012	2	3:56	Knoxville, Tennessee, United States	
Win	1–0	Billy Mullins	KO (punches)	XFC 18	June 22, 2012	2	1:21	Nashville, Tennessee, United States	Featherweight debut.

== See also ==
- List of current UFC fighters
- List of male mixed martial artists
