= Herbert Burns =

Brazilian mixed martial artist

- Born: Herbert Mitchell Pontes Burns; February 2, 1988 (age 38); Niterói, Rio de Janeiro, Brazil
- Other names: The Blaze
- Height: 5 ft 9 in (1.75 m)
- Weight: 145 lb (66 kg; 10 st 5 lb)
- Division: Featherweight
- Reach: 73 1/2 in (187 cm)
- Style: Brazilian Jiu-jitsu; Submission wrestling
- Team: Evolve MMA (2013–2015); Kill Cliff FC (2017–present); The Way Martial Arts (2022–present)
- Trainer: Henri Hooft (striking); Neil Melanson (Catch wrestling)
- Rank: 3rd degree black belt in Brazilian Jiu-Jitsu under Rafael "Fofitio" Barros and Gilbert Burns
- Years active: 2012–present

Mixed martial arts record
- Total: 17
- Wins: 11
- By knockout: 1
- By submission: 8
- By decision: 2
- Losses: 6
- By knockout: 4
- By decision: 2

Other information
- Notable relatives: Gilbert Burns (brother)
- Mixed martial arts record from Sherdog

Herbert Mitchell Pontes Burns (born February 2, 1988) is a Brazilian mixed martial artist who has competed in the featherweight divisions of the Ultimate Fighting Championship and ONE Championship. He is the younger brother of fellow UFC fighter, Gilbert Burns.

== Background ==
Burns was born in Niterói, Brazil, in 1988. He has two older brothers, Gilbert and Frederick, who both are also jiu-jitsu black belts. He played soccer and trained Shotokan karate under his father Herbert Sr. in his early childhood, eventually winning a state championship in the latter sport. As the interest in both sports gradually declined, Herbert started training Brazilian jiu-jitsu at the same time with his brothers when he was ten years old.

== Mixed martial arts career ==
=== Early career ===
Burns made his professional debut in 2012 in the regional circuit, scoring a first-minute submission victory. After the debut, he was rapidly signed to ONE Championship where he amassed a record of 5–2 before transitioning stateside as his contract with the organization expired.

Burns signed a four-fight contract with the Titan FC in November 2018. He ended up fighting two bouts in the organization, winning both via submission.

=== Dana White's Contender Series ===
After the short tenure in Titan, Burns was invited to participate in the Dana White's Contender Series 23 on August 9, 2019. He faced Darrick Minner, winning the bout via first-round submission, earning a UFC contract with the performance.

=== Ultimate Fighting Championship ===
Burns made his UFC debut against fellow newcomer Nate Landwehr at UFC Fight Night: Blaydes vs. dos Santos on January 25, 2020. He won the fight via knockout in round one, for which he also earned the Performance of the Night bonus.

Burns faced Evan Dunham on June 6, 2020, at UFC 250 in a 150 lb catchweight bout. He won the bout via rear-naked choke submission in round one.

Burns faced Daniel Pineda on August 15, 2020, at UFC 252. He lost the fight via technical knockout in round two.

Burns was scheduled to face Billy Quarantillo on July 17, 2021, at UFC on ESPN 26. However, Burns pulled out in early June due to undisclosed reasons and was replaced by Gabriel Benítez.

As the first fight of his new four-fight contract, Burns was scheduled to face Khusein Askhabov on July 16, 2022, at UFC on ABC 3. However, after Askhabov pulled out due to injury, Burns was booked against Bill Algeo. Despite a tight triangle choke attempt in the first round, Burns lost the fight via technical knockout in round two after he was unable to return to his feet.

Burns faced Julio Arce on March 30, 2024, at UFC on ESPN 54. At the weigh ins, Arce weighed in at 147.25 pounds, one and a quarter pounds over the featherweight non-title fight limit. His bout proceeded at catchweight and Arce was fined 20 percent of his purse which went to Burns. Burns lost the fight via technical knockout in round two.

Replacing an injured Gavin Tucker, Burns faced Jack Jenkins on August 17, 2024, at UFC 305. After being knocked down in the third round, Burns lost the fight via technical knockout when he could not return to his feet.

On October 10, 2024, it was reported that Burns was removed from the UFC roster.

== Professional grappling career ==
Burns competed against Pat Sabatini at Fury Pro Grappling 11 on November 2, 2024. He lost the match by golden score in overtime.

== Personal life ==
Burns has a daughter born in 2009.

== Championships and accomplishments ==
=== Mixed martial arts ===
- Ultimate Fighting Championship
  - Performance of the Night (One time) vs. Nate Landwehr
  - 2020 Half-Year Awards: Best Newcomer of the 1HY
  - Only fighter in the UFC history to lose multiple bouts via retirement

== Mixed martial arts record ==
Professional record breakdown
17 matches	11 wins	6 losses
By knockout	1	4
By submission	8	0
By decision	2	2

Res.	Record	Opponent	Method	Event	Date	Round	Time	Location	Notes
Loss	11–6	Jack Jenkins	TKO (retirement)	UFC 305	August 18, 2024	3	0:48	Perth, Australia	
Loss	11–5	Julio Arce	TKO (punches)	UFC on ESPN: Blanchfield vs. Fiorot	March 30, 2024	2	2:00	Atlantic City, New Jersey, United States	Catchweight (147.25 lb) bout; Arce missed weight. Burns was deducted one point in round 1 due to repeated illegal groin strikes.
Loss	11–4	Bill Algeo	TKO (retirement)	UFC on ABC: Ortega vs. Rodríguez	July 16, 2022	2	1:50	Elmont, New York, United States	
Loss	11–3	Daniel Pineda	TKO (elbows)	UFC 252	August 15, 2020	2	4:37	Las Vegas, Nevada, United States	Catchweight (149.5 lb) bout; Burns missed weight.
Win	11–2	Evan Dunham	Submission (rear-naked choke)	UFC 250	June 6, 2020	1	1:20	Las Vegas, Nevada, United States	Catchweight (150 lb) bout.
Win	10–2	Nate Landwehr	KO (knee)	UFC Fight Night: Blaydes vs. dos Santos	January 25, 2020	1	2:43	Raleigh, North Carolina, United States	Performance of the Night.
Win	9–2	Darrick Minner	Submission (triangle armbar)	Dana White's Contender Series 23	August 6, 2019	1	2:29	Las Vegas, Nevada, United States	
Win	8–2	Luis Gomez	Submission (rear-naked choke)	Titan FC 54	April 26, 2019	1	2:24	Fort Lauderdale, Florida, United States	
Win	7–2	Aibek Nurseit	Submission (triangle armbar)	Titan FC 51	December 21, 2018	2	2:35	Almaty, Kazakhstan	
Loss	6–2	Magomed Idrisov	Decision (unanimous)	ONE: Kings & Conquerors	August 5, 2017	3	5:00	Macau, SAR, China	
Loss	6–1	Movlid Khaybulaev	Decision (unanimous)	ONE: Throne of Tigers	February 10, 2017	3	5:00	Kuala Lumpur, Malaysia	
Win	6–0	Timofey Nastyukhin	Submission (rear-naked choke)	ONE: Odyssey of Champions	September 27, 2015	1	3:26	Jakarta, Indonesia	
Win	5–0	Honorio Banario	Submission (rear-naked choke)	ONE FC: Warrior's Way	December 5, 2014	1	3:59	Manila, Philippines	
Win	4–0	Hiroshige Tanaka	Decision (unanimous)	ONE FC: Reign of Champions	August 29, 2014	3	5:00	Dubai, United Arab Emirates	
Win	3–0	Harris Sarmiento	Decision (unanimous)	ONE FC: War of Nations	March 14, 2014	3	5:00	Kuala Lumpur, Malaysia	
Win	2–0	Edward Kelly	Submission (rear-naked choke)	ONE FC: Moment of Truth	December 6, 2013	1	0:44	Pasay, Philippines	
Win	1–0	Saulo Eduardo da Silva	Submission (triangle armbar)	Only FC 1	February 25, 2012	1	0:25	São Gonçalo, Brazil	Featherweight debut.

== See also ==
- List of male mixed martial artists
