= Bill Algeo =

American mixed martial artist

- Born: June 9, 1989 (age 37); Boothwyn, Pennsylvania, United States
- Other names: Señor Perfecto
- Height: 5 ft 11 in (1.80 m)
- Weight: 146 lb (66 kg; 10 st 6 lb)
- Division: Featherweight
- Reach: 73 in (185 cm)
- Fighting out of: King of Prussia, Pennsylvania
- Team: Algeo MMA and Kickboxing; Balance MMA
- Rank: Black belt in Brazilian Jiu-Jitsu under Tim Carpenter
- Years active: 2012–2025

Mixed martial arts record
- Total: 27
- Wins: 18
- By knockout: 4
- By submission: 7
- By decision: 7
- Losses: 9
- By knockout: 2
- By submission: 2
- By decision: 5

Other information
- Mixed martial arts record from Sherdog

Bill Algeo (born June 9, 1989) is an American former mixed martial artist who competed in the Featherweight division of the Ultimate Fighting Championship.

== Background ==
Bill Algeo, a Delaware County native, started his martial arts career at the age of 14 after following his brother's footsteps in wrestling. Going 0–14 to start his wrestling career, four years later he went on to become All-State and captain of the wrestling team.

Starting Brazilian jiu-jitsu at 18, two years later he was running a BJJ program at Penn State University where he was going to school full time for his B.A. in accounting. While at Penn State, he was also a member of the Penn State boxing team, and was partaking in amateur MMA bouts, going undefeated as an amateur, until turning professional in 2011.

== Mixed martial arts career ==
=== Early career ===
Starting his professional mixed martial artist career in June 2012, he submitted David Miller via arm-triangle choke in the first round in his MMA debut. Losing his next bout against Dean Lavin via first round armbar, Algeo would go win his next 5 bouts, tapping out 4 of them and ending the other via TKO. Losing to future UFC fighter Shane Burgos in his next bout at CFFC 42 via unanimous decision, he defeated his next two foes via decision in Anthony Terrell and Jeff Lentz at CFFC 49 and CFFC 57, missing weight in his championship bout against Lentz, meaning he was unable to win the title. In his second try for the CFFC Featherweight title, he lost to Jared Gordon via unanimous decision. Debuting with Ring Of Combat at ROC 61, Algeo defeated Tim Dooling via TKO in the second round, winning the ROC Featherweight title. He would defend his title three times, defeating James Gonzalez via unanimous decision at ROC 63, knocking out Scott Heckman in the second round at ROC 65, and tapping out John de Jesus via rear-naked choke in the second round at ROC 67. After this win, he was invited to Dana White's Contender Series 17, where he lost to Brendan Loughnane via unanimous decision. Algeo would return to CFFC for CFFC 83, where rematched against Tim Dooling, once again winning against him, this time via unanimous decision.

=== Ultimate Fighting Championship ===
Algeo made his UFC debut, as a short notice replacement for Ryan Hall, against Ricardo Lamas on August 29, 2020, at UFC Fight Night: Smith vs. Rakić. He lost the fight via unanimous decision. This fight earned him the Fight of the Night award.

Algeo faced Spike Carlyle at UFC on ESPN: Smith vs. Clark on November 28, 2020. He won the bout via unanimous decision.

Algeo was scheduled to face Ricardo Ramos on April 17, 2021, at UFC on ESPN: Whittaker vs. Gastelum. However, Ramos was pulled from the fight during the week leading up to the event due to COVID-19 protocols. The bout was cancelled, and was rescheduled for UFC Fight Night: Font vs. Garbrandt. Algeo lost a close bout via unanimous decision. Seven MMA media outlets gave it to Ramos and six media outlets gave it to Algeo.

Algeo faced Joanderson Brito on January 15, 2022, at UFC on ESPN 32. He won the fight via unanimous decision.

Algeo was scheduled to face Billy Quarantillo on July 16, 2022, at UFC on ABC 3. However, after Quarantillo pulled out due to injury, Algeo was booked against Herbert Burns. He won the fight via TKO in the second round after Burns was unable to return to his feet. This win earned Algeo his first Performance of the Night bonus award.

Algeo faced Andre Fili on September 17, 2022, at UFC Fight Night 210, after Fili's original opponent, Lando Vannata, pulled out due to injury. He lost the fight via split decision.

Algeo faced T.J. Brown on April 15, 2023, at UFC on ESPN 44. He won the fight via a rear-naked choke submission in the second round. This fight earned him his second Fight of the Night award.

Algeo faced Alexander Hernandez on October 7, 2023, at UFC Fight Night 229. He won the fight via unanimous decision.

Algeo faced Kyle Nelson on March 30, 2024, at UFC on ESPN 54. He lost the fight via technical knockout in round one.

Algeo faced Choi Doo-ho on July 20, 2024, at UFC on ESPN 60. He lost the fight by technical knockout in the second round.

On February 11, 2025, Algeo announced his retirement from competition.

== Professional grappling career ==
Algeo was booked to compete against Andrew Kochel at Fury Pro Grappling 7 on May 27, 2023. He lost the match by submission, a straight ankle-lock.

== Championships and accomplishments ==
- Ultimate Fighting Championship
  - Fight of the Night (Two times) vs. Ricardo Lamas & T.J. Brown
  - Performance of the Night (One time) vs. Herbert Burns
- Ring of Combat
  - ROC Featherweight Champion (One time)
    - 3 successful title defenses

== Mixed martial arts record ==
Professional record breakdown
27 matches	18 wins	9 losses
By knockout	4	2
By submission	7	2
By decision	7	5

Res.	Record	Opponent	Method	Event	Date	Round	Time	Location	Notes
Loss	18–9	Choi Doo-ho	TKO (submission to punch)	UFC on ESPN: Lemos vs. Jandiroba	July 20, 2024	2	3:38	Las Vegas, Nevada, United States	
Loss	18–8	Kyle Nelson	TKO (punches)	UFC on ESPN: Blanchfield vs. Fiorot	March 30, 2024	1	4:00	Atlantic City, New Jersey, United States	
Win	18–7	Alexander Hernandez	Decision (unanimous)	UFC Fight Night: Dawson vs. Green	October 7, 2023	3	5:00	Las Vegas, Nevada, United States	
Win	17–7	T.J. Brown	Submission (rear-naked choke)	UFC on ESPN: Holloway vs. Allen	April 15, 2023	2	1:40	Kansas City, Missouri, United States	Fight of the Night.
Loss	16–7	Andre Fili	Decision (split)	UFC Fight Night: Sandhagen vs. Song	September 17, 2022	3	5:00	Las Vegas, Nevada, United States	
Win	16–6	Herbert Burns	TKO (retirement)	UFC on ABC: Ortega vs. Rodríguez	July 16, 2022	2	1:50	Elmont, New York, United States	Performance of the Night.
Win	15–6	Joanderson Brito	Decision (unanimous)	UFC on ESPN: Kattar vs. Chikadze	January 15, 2022	3	5:00	Las Vegas, Nevada, United States	
Loss	14–6	Ricardo Ramos	Decision (unanimous)	UFC Fight Night: Font vs. Garbrandt	May 22, 2021	3	5:00	Las Vegas, Nevada, United States	
Win	14–5	Spike Carlyle	Decision (unanimous)	UFC on ESPN: Smith vs. Clark	November 28, 2020	3	5:00	Las Vegas, Nevada, United States	
Loss	13–5	Ricardo Lamas	Decision (unanimous)	UFC Fight Night: Smith vs. Rakić	August 29, 2020	3	5:00	Las Vegas, Nevada, United States	Fight of the Night.
Win	13–4	Tim Dooling	Decision (unanimous)	CFFC 83	August 13, 2020	3	5:00	Philadelphia, Pennsylvania, United States	
Loss	12–4	Brendan Loughnane	Decision (unanimous)	Dana White's Contender Series 17	June 18, 2019	3	5:00	Las Vegas, Nevada, United States	
Win	12–3	John De Jesus	Submission (rear-naked choke)	Ring of Combat 67	February 22, 2019	2	3:07	Las Vegas, Nevada, United States	Defended the ROC Featherweight Championship.
Win	11–3	Scott Heckman	KO (flying head kick)	Ring of Combat 65	September 21, 2018	2	3:24	Atlantic City, New Jersey, United States	Defended the ROC Featherweight Championship.
Win	10–3	James Gonzalez	Decision (unanimous)	Ring of Combat 63	June 8, 2018	3	5:00	Atlantic City, New Jersey, United States	Defended the ROC Featherweight Championship.
Win	9–3	Tim Dooling	TKO (punches)	Ring of Combat 61	November 17, 2017	2	3:28	Atlantic City, New Jersey, United States	Won the vacant ROC Featherweight Championship.
Loss	8–3	Jared Gordon	Decision (unanimous)	CFFC 63	February 18, 2017	4	5:00	Atlantic City, New Jersey, United States	For the CFFC Featherweight Championship.
Win	8–2	Jeff Lentz	Decision (unanimous)	CFFC 57	March 19, 2016	5	5:00	Philadelphia, Pennsylvania, United States	For the CFFC Featherweight Championship; Algeo missed weight and was ineligible to win the title.
Win	7–2	Anthony Terrell Smith	Decision (unanimous)	CFFC 49	June 6, 2015	3	5:00	Bethlehem, Pennsylvania, United States	
Loss	6–2	Shane Burgos	Submission (rear-naked choke)	CFFC 42	October 25, 2014	2	2:35	Chester, Pennsylvania, United States	
Win	6–1	Mike Pope	Submission (rear-naked choke)	CFFC 37	June 28, 2014	1	2:51	Philadelphia, Pennsylvania, United States	
Win	5–1	Joel Roberts	TKO (punches)	CFFC 32	February 22, 2014	3	2:08	King of Prussia, Pennsylvania, United States	Catchweight (150 lb) bout.
Win	4–1	Myron Baker	Submission (rear-naked choke)	CFFC 27	September 21, 2013	2	3:26	King of Prussia, Pennsylvania, United States	
Win	3–1	Frank Buenafuente	Submission (rear-naked choke)	WSOF 2	March 23, 2013	2	4:36	Atlantic City, New Jersey, United States	
Win	2–1	Shane Manley	Submission (rear-naked choke)	CFFC 20	February 8, 2013	2	2:28	King of Prussia, Pennsylvania, United States	
Loss	1–1	Dean Lavin	Submission (armbar)	Cage Wars 18	October 13, 2012	1	1:11	Chester, Pennsylvania, United States	
Win	1–0	David Miller	Submission (arm-triangle choke)	Cage Wars 15	June 1, 2012	1	3:40	Chester, Pennsylvania, United States	

== See also ==
- List of Dana White's Contender Series alumni
- List of male mixed martial artists
