= Jared Gordon =

American mixed martial artist (born 1988)

- Born: Jared Gordon; September 6, 1988 (age 38); Queens, New York, U.S.
- Other names: Flash
- Height: 5 ft 9 in (1.75 m)
- Weight: 155 lb (70 kg; 11.1 st)
- Division: Featherweight; Lightweight
- Reach: 68 in (173 cm)
- Fighting out of: Boynton Beach, Florida, U.S.
- Team: Church Street Boxing Gym (formerly); Renzo Gracie Jiu-Jitsu (formerly); Edge Hoboken (formerly); Roufusport (2018–2019); Kill Cliff FC (2019–present)
- Teachers: Michael Jaramillo - BJJ; Jason Strout - Boxing
- Rank: Black belt in Brazilian Jiu-Jitsu under Mike Jaramillo
- Years active: 2007–present

Mixed martial arts record
- Total: 32
- Wins: 21
- By knockout: 8
- By submission: 2
- By decision: 11
- Losses: 10
- By knockout: 5
- By submission: 2
- By decision: 3
- No contests: 1

Other information
- Mixed martial arts record from Sherdog

Jared Gordon (born September 6, 1988) is an American mixed martial artist. He was the lightweight champion of Duelo de Gigantes in Mexico and featherweight champion for Cage Fury Fighting Championships in the United States. He currently competes in the lightweight division of the Ultimate Fighting Championship (UFC).

== Background ==
Gordon was born and raised in Queens, New York. The grandson of late professional boxer Sal Ferello, Gordon started boxing and wrestling at a young age and he was obsessed with MMA when he was in high school. He found an MMA school, Combined MMA, and started training BJJ. Gordon spent most of his adolescence in Westport CT attending Staples High School. In his time in Westport Gordon learned valuable skills from his uncle Oliver Barkley. Four months later, at age of 17, Gordon fought his first amateur MMA fight. He taught boxing and Muay Thai at Church Street Boxing in New York prior to turning professional. During this time, he was trained by his coach Jason Strout.

Gordon is in long-term recovery from heavy drug use. He would like to use the octagon as a platform to voice his support and give hope to those who suffer the same addiction.

== Mixed martial arts career ==
=== Early career ===
Gordon amassed a record of 12–1 prior joining UFC. He was the lightweight champion of Duelo de Giagantes in Mexico and featherweight champion for Cage Fury Fighting Championship in the United States.

=== Ultimate Fighting Championship ===
Gordon was scouted by Dana White on UFC web series show "Dana White: Looking for a fight" second-season episode two at Cage Fury Fighting Championships where Gordon won the Featherweight title that night. White was impressed with his performance and signed him onto UFC.

Gordon was scheduled his promotional debut to face Michel Quiñones at UFC 211. However, Gordon pulled out of the fight on the day before the event due to stomach illness and the bout was rescheduled to June 25, 2017, at UFC Fight Night 112 in Oklahoma City. At the weigh-in, Gordon missed the required featherweight limit for the fight of 146Ibs. As a result, he was fined 20% of his pay, and the bouts proceeded at catchweight. Gordon secured his first UFC win on round two via TKO.

Gordon faced Hacran Dias at the lightweight bout on October 28, 2017, at UFC Fight Night 119. He won the fight via unanimous decision.

Gordon faced Carlos Diego Ferreira on February 18, 2018, at UFC Fight Night 126. He lost the fight via TKO in the first round. After the loss, Gordon decided to move to Milwaukee to train at Roufusport under Duke Roufus.

Gordon faced Joaquim Silva on December 15, 2018, at UFC on Fox 31. He lost the fight via knockout in round three. This fight earned him the Fight of the Night award. Despite losing the two last fights of his rookie contract, he signed a new four-fight contract with the UFC after the Silva fight.

Gordon faced Dan Moret on June 29, 2019, at UFC on ESPN 3. He won the fight via unanimous decision.

Gordon was expected to face Leonardo Santos on November 16, 2019, at UFC Fight Night 164. However, Santos withdrew from the fight and was replaced by Charles Oliveira. He lost the fight via knockout in the first round.

Gordon was scheduled to face Matt Sayles at UFC on ESPN 8 on May 16, 2020. However, on April 9, Dana White, the president of UFC announced that this event was postponed to a future date due to COVID-19 pandemic.

Gordon faced Chris Fishgold in a featherweight bout on July 16, 2020, at UFC on ESPN 13. At the weigh-ins, Fishgold weighed in at 149 pounds, 3 pounds over the featherweight non-title fight limit. He was fined 20% of the purse which went to Gordon and their bout proceeded at catchweight. Gordon won the fight via unanimous decision. With one fight left on his contract, Gordon subsequently signed a new contract with the UFC.

Gordon faced Danny Chavez on February 20, 2021, at UFC Fight Night 185. At the weigh-ins, Gorden weighed in at 150 pounds, four pounds over the featherweight non-title fight limit. He was fined 30% of his purse which went to his opponent Chavez and the bout proceed at catchweight. Gordon won the fight via unanimous decision.

Gordon faced Joe Solecki on October 2, 2021, at UFC Fight Night 193. He won the fight via split decision.

Gordon was scheduled to face Rafael Alves on April 30, 2022, at UFC on ESPN 35. However, Alves withdrew from the event for undisclosed reasons, and he was replaced by Grant Dawson. He lost the bout via rear-naked choke late into the third round.

Gordon faced Leonardo Santos on August 20, 2022, at UFC 278. He won the bout via unanimous decision.

Gordon faced Paddy Pimblett on December 10, 2022, at UFC 282. He lost the bout via unanimous decision. The decision was seen as controversial, as many media outlets, fighters, and fans expressed their belief that Gordon had won the fight. 23 out of 24 media sources scored the fight in his favor.

Gordon faced Bobby Green on April 22, 2023, at UFC Fight Night 222. Late in the first round, Gordon was knocked down via a headbutt that went unnoticed by referee Keith Peterson, with Gordon being finished by knockout moments later. Subsequently, the ringside officials reviewed the finishing sequence, and it was determined that a clash of heads did indeed occur. The headbutt was unintentional by Bobby Green. As a result, the fight was ruled a no contest.

Gordon was scheduled to face Jim Miller, replacing Ľudovít Klein, on June 3, 2023, at UFC on ESPN 46. Simultaneously, Gordon signed a new multi-fight contract with the UFC. However he pulled out because of a concussion sustained in his last fight versus Bobby Green.

Gordon faced Mark Madsen on November 11, 2023, at UFC 295. He won the bout at the end of the first round via TKO stoppage after dropping Madsen with an elbow and finishing him with ground and pound.

Gordon faced Nasrat Haqparast on June 22, 2024, at UFC on ABC 6. He lost the fight by a close split decision.

Gordon was scheduled to face Kauê Fernandes on February 15, 2025, at UFC Fight Night 251. However, Fernandes withdrew from the fight due to visa issues and was replaced by promotional newcomer Mashrabjon Ruziboev. In turn, although Gordon made weight, the bout was cancelled due to Ruziboev's illness.

Gordon faced Thiago Moisés on May 17, 2025, at UFC Fight Night 256. He won the fight by knockout in the first round.

Gordon faced Rafa García on September 13, 2025, at UFC Fight Night 259. He lost the fight by technical knockout via punches and elbows in the third round.

Gordon faced Jim Miller on May 9, 2026 at UFC 328. He lost the fight via a guillotine choke in round one.

Gordon faced Melquizael Costa on November 14, 2026 at UFC 334. He lost the fight by unanimous decision.

== Personal life ==
=== Drug addiction ===
Gordon used prescription pain medication to manage his pain from an injury and led him to drug addiction at the age of 19 and by 21 he was addicted to heroin. At 23, he was homeless and panhandling in the streets to support his drug habit. At some point, Gordon managed to get into a rehab program and became clean. He returned to fighting soon after. His fight against Jeff Lentz ended with Gordon suffering a broken orbital bone in five places. Due to this injury, he was given pain medication to help him deal with his injured eye, and he became addicted, ultimately leading to an overdose incident. Gordon managed to beat his drug addiction and stay sober by checking himself in rehab after the third overdose in 2015 left him legally dead for two minutes. He is now in long-term recovery from problem drug use.

I overdosed three times. I was facing 25 years to life at one point. I’ve been homeless, panhandling, I’ve been to psych wards. I’ve been to rehab 10 times, and I’ve had near-death situations. At this point, I just consider myself grateful and extremely lucky and blessed to be where I am.

== Championships and accomplishments ==
=== Mixed martial arts ===
- Ultimate Fighting Championship
  - Fight of the Night (One time) vs. Joaquim Silva
- Duelo de Gigantes
  - Duelo de Gigantes Lightweight Champion (One time) vs. Alejandro Roman
- Cage Fury Fighting Championships
  - CFFC Featherweight Championship (One time) vs. Bill Algeo

== Mixed martial arts record ==
Professional record breakdown
32 matches	21 wins	10 losses
By knockout	8	5
By submission	2	2
By decision	11	3
No contests	1	

Res.	Record	Opponent	Method	Event	Date	Round	Time	Location	Notes
Loss	21–10 (1)	Melquizael Costa	Decision (unanimous)	UFC 334	November 14, 2026	3	5:00	New York City, New York, United States	
Loss	21–9 (1)	Jim Miller	Submission (guillotine choke)	UFC 328	May 9, 2026	1	3:29	Newark, New Jersey, United States	
Loss	21–8 (1)	Rafa García	TKO (elbows)	UFC Fight Night: Lopes vs. Silva	September 13, 2025	3	2:27	San Antonio, Texas, United States	
Win	21–7 (1)	Thiago Moisés	KO (punches)	UFC Fight Night: Burns vs. Morales	May 17, 2025	1	3:37	Las Vegas, Nevada, United States	
Loss	20–7 (1)	Nasrat Haqparast	Decision (split)	UFC on ABC: Whittaker vs. Aliskerov	June 22, 2024	3	5:00	Riyadh, Saudi Arabia	
Win	20–6 (1)	Mark Madsen	TKO (elbow and punches)	UFC 295	November 11, 2023	1	4:42	New York City, New York, United States	
NC	19–6 (1)	Bobby Green	NC (accidental clash of heads)	UFC Fight Night: Pavlovich vs. Blaydes	April 22, 2023	1	4:35	Las Vegas, Nevada, United States	Accidental clash of heads led to Gordon being knocked unconscious.
Loss	19–6	Paddy Pimblett	Decision (unanimous)	UFC 282	December 10, 2022	3	5:00	Las Vegas, Nevada, United States	
Win	19–5	Leonardo Santos	Decision (unanimous)	UFC 278	August 20, 2022	3	5:00	Salt Lake City, Utah, United States	
Loss	18–5	Grant Dawson	Submission (rear-naked choke)	UFC on ESPN: Font vs. Vera	April 30, 2022	3	4:11	Las Vegas, Nevada, United States	
Win	18–4	Joe Solecki	Decision (split)	UFC Fight Night: Santos vs. Walker	October 2, 2021	3	5:00	Las Vegas, Nevada, United States	Return to Lightweight.
Win	17–4	Danny Chavez	Decision (unanimous)	UFC Fight Night: Blaydes vs. Lewis	February 20, 2021	3	5:00	Las Vegas, Nevada, United States	Catchweight (150 lb) bout; Gordon missed weight.
Win	16–4	Chris Fishgold	Decision (unanimous)	UFC on ESPN: Kattar vs. Ige	July 16, 2020	3	5:00	Abu Dhabi, United Arab Emirates	Return to Featherweight; Fishgold missed weight (149 lb).
Loss	15–4	Charles Oliveira	KO (punches)	UFC Fight Night: Błachowicz vs. Jacaré	November 16, 2019	1	1:26	São Paulo, Brazil	
Win	15–3	Dan Moret	Decision (unanimous)	UFC on ESPN: Ngannou vs. dos Santos	June 29, 2019	3	5:00	Minneapolis, Minnesota, United States	
Loss	14–3	Joaquim Silva	KO (punches)	UFC on Fox: Lee vs. Iaquinta 2	December 15, 2018	3	2:39	Milwaukee, Wisconsin, United States	Fight of the Night.
Loss	14–2	Carlos Diego Ferreira	TKO (punches)	UFC Fight Night: Cowboy vs. Medeiros	February 18, 2018	1	1:58	Austin, Texas, United States	
Win	14–1	Hacran Dias	Decision (unanimous)	UFC Fight Night: Brunson vs. Machida	October 28, 2017	3	5:00	São Paulo, Brazil	Return to Lightweight.
Win	13–1	Michel Quiñones	TKO (punches)	UFC Fight Night: Chiesa vs. Lee	June 25, 2017	2	4:24	Oklahoma City, Oklahoma, United States	Catchweight (149 lb) bout; Gordon missed weight.
Win	12–1	Bill Algeo	Decision (unanimous)	Cage Fury FC 63	February 18, 2017	4	5:00	Atlantic City, New Jersey, United States	Defended the Cage Fury FC Featherweight Championship.
Win	11–1	Dawond Pickney	Submission (rear-naked choke)	Cage Fury FC 60	August 6, 2016	2	3:10	Atlantic City, New Jersey, United States	Lightweight bout.
Win	10–1	Anthony Morrison	KO (head kick)	Cage Fury FC 59	July 9, 2016	1	1:48	Philadelphia, Pennsylvania, United States	Won the vacant Cage Fury FC Featherweight Championship.
Loss	9–1	Jeff Lentz	TKO (doctor stoppage)	Cage Fury FC 48	May 9, 2015	3	5:00	Atlantic City, New Jersey, United States	Featherweight debut. For the vacant Cage Fury FC Featherweight Championship.
Win	9–0	Jay Coleman	TKO (punches)	Cage Fury FC 45	February 7, 2015	1	4:47	Atlantic City, New Jersey, United States	
Win	8–0	Corey Bleaken	Decision (unanimous)	Cage Fury FC 44	December 13, 2014	3	5:00	Bethlehem, Pennsylvania, United States	
Win	7–0	Johnson Jajoute	Decision (unanimous)	Cage Fury FC 28	October 26, 2013	3	5:00	Atlantic City, New Jersey, United States	
Win	6–0	Alejandro Roman	Decision (unanimous)	Duelo de Gigantes: Round 4	June 22, 2013	5	5:00	Zumpango, Mexico	
Win	5–0	Luiz Gustavo Felix dos Santos	Decision (unanimous)	Duelo de Gigantes: Round 3	June 15, 2013	3	5:00	Zumpango, Mexico	
Win	4–0	Oscar De La Parra	TKO (punches)	Duelo de Gigantes: Round 2	June 8, 2013	3	2:14	Zumpango, Mexico	
Win	3–0	Alvaro Enriquez	TKO (punches)	Duelo de Gigantes: Round 1	June 2, 2013	2	4:25	Mexico City, Mexico	
Win	2–0	Robert Fabrizi	TKO (punches)	Cage Fury FC 19	February 2, 2013	2	2:31	Atlantic City, New Jersey, United States	
Win	1–0	Anthony D'Agostino	Submission (rear-naked choke)	Cage Fury FC 6	February 5, 2011	2	1:42	Atlantic City, New Jersey, United States	Lightweight debut.

== See also ==
- List of current UFC fighters
- List of male mixed martial artists
- Cage Fury Fighting Championships
