= UFC 252 =

UFC mixed martial arts event in 2020

UFC 252: Miocic vs. Cormier 3
- The poster for UFC 252: Miocic vs. Cormier 3
- Promotion: Ultimate Fighting Championship
- Date: August 15, 2020
- Venue: UFC Apex
- City: Enterprise, Nevada, United States
- Attendance: None (behind closed doors)
- Buyrate: 500,000

Event chronology
UFC Fight Night: Lewis vs. Oleinik	UFC 252: Miocic vs. Cormier 3	UFC on ESPN: Munhoz vs. Edgar

UFC 252: Miocic vs. Cormier 3 was a mixed martial arts event produced by the Ultimate Fighting Championship that took place on August 15, 2020, at the UFC Apex facility in Enterprise, Nevada, part of the Las Vegas Metropolitan Area, United States.

== Background ==
The promotion was initially targeting another event to take place on this date at 3Arena in Dublin, Ireland. However, the organization confirmed in June that the Dublin card was indefinitely postponed due to the COVID-19 pandemic.

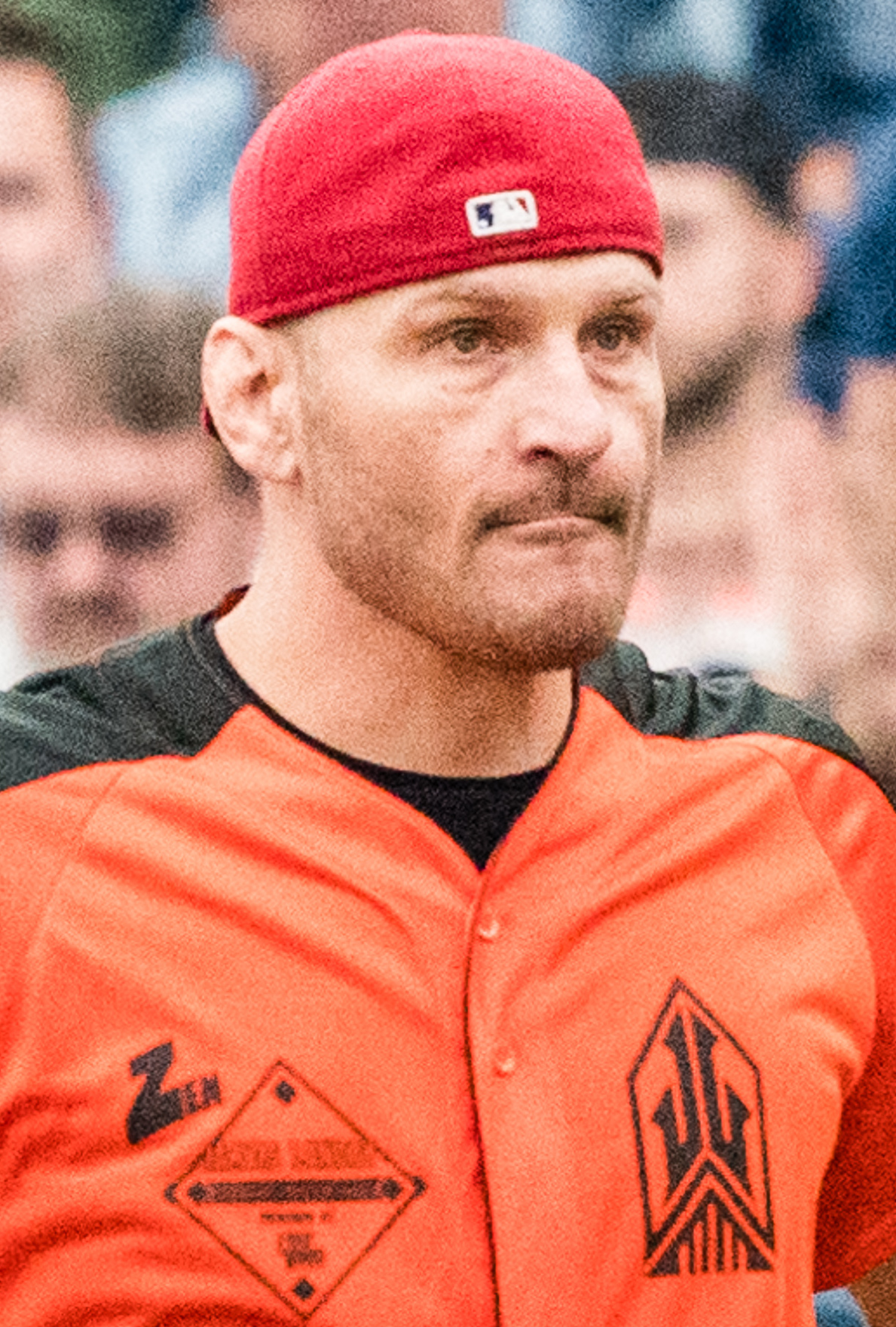
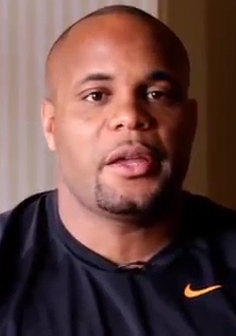
Miocic (left) still holds the UFC heavyweight record of consecutive title defenses (three). Cormier (right) is the only fighter in UFC history to hold both the heavyweight and light heavyweight titles simultaneously.

A UFC Heavyweight Championship trilogy between current two-time champion Stipe Miocic and former champion Daniel Cormier (also former UFC Light Heavyweight Champion) took place as the event headliner. The pairing first met at UFC 226 on July 7, 2018, where Cormier, as the light heavyweight champion, returned to heavyweight and captured the title by knocking Miocic out in the first round. Their second meeting took place at UFC 241 on August 17, 2019, where Miocic regained the belt and got his revenge via fourth-round knockout. Cormier also announced that he planned on retiring after this bout.

A bantamweight bout between Pedro Munhoz and former UFC Lightweight Champion Frankie Edgar was briefly linked to UFC 251, but promotion officials elected to schedule the pairing four days later for UFC on ESPN: Kattar vs. Ige. On July 6, it was announced that the bout between Munhoz and Edgar was scrapped after Munhoz tested positive for COVID-19. They were later rescheduled for this event. However, promotion officials then moved the pairing again to serve as the main event of UFC on ESPN: Munhoz vs. Edgar.

A light heavyweight rematch between Magomed Ankalaev and Ion Cuțelaba was expected to take place at this event. The pairing first met at UFC Fight Night: Benavidez vs. Figueiredo, where Ankalaev won via controversial knockout. The bout was originally expected to take place at UFC 249, on its original April 18 date. However, Ankalaev was forced to pull out of the event due to travel restrictions related to the COVID-19 pandemic. Cuțelaba then pulled out on August 11, as a result of testing positive for COVID-19 and the bout was rescheduled for UFC Fight Night: Smith vs. Rakić.

Rogério Bontorin was expected to face promotional newcomer Manel Kape at the event. However, Bontorin pulled out of the fight on July 22 due to an ankle injury. In turn, Kape announced his debut would be postponed and that he would not appear on the card either, also due to an ankle injury.

A light heavyweight bout between Jorge Gonzalez and Ike Villanueva was expected to take place at the event. However, due to alleged visa issues for Gonzalez, the pairing was pushed back and expected to take place a week later at UFC on ESPN: Munhoz vs. Edgar.

At the weigh-ins, Herbert Burns and T.J. Brown missed weight for their respective featherweight bouts. Burns weighed in at 149.5 pounds, three and a half pounds over the non-title fight limit. Brown weighed in at 146.5 pounds, half a pound over the non-title fight limit. Both of their bouts proceeded at a catchweight and they were each fined 20% of their individual purses, which went to their opponents Daniel Pineda and Danny Chavez.

== Results ==
Main card
Weight class				Method	Round	Time	Notes
Heavyweight	Stipe Miocic (c)	def.	Daniel Cormier	Decision (unanimous) (49–46, 49–46, 48–47)	5	5:00	(Note: For the UFC Heavyweight Championship.)
Bantamweight	Marlon Vera	def.	Sean O'Malley	TKO (elbows and punches)	1	4:40
Heavyweight	Jairzinho Rozenstruik	def.	Junior dos Santos	TKO (punches)	2	3:47
Catchweight (149.5 lb)	Daniel Pineda	def.	Herbert Burns	TKO (elbows)	2	4:37
Bantamweight	Merab Dvalishvili	def.	John Dodson	Decision (unanimous) (30–27, 30–27, 30–27)	3	5:00
Preliminary Card (ESPN / ESPN+)
Lightweight	Vinc Pichel	def.	Jim Miller	Decision (unanimous) (29–28, 29–28, 29–27)	3	5:00
Women's Strawweight	Virna Jandiroba	def.	Felice Herrig	Submission (armbar)	1	1:44
Catchweight (146.5 lb)	Danny Chavez	def.	T.J. Brown	Decision (unanimous) (29–28, 29–28, 29–28)	3	5:00
Women's Strawweight	Lívia Renata Souza	def.	Ashley Yoder	Decision (unanimous) (29–28, 29–28, 30–27)	3	5:00
Early Preliminary Card (ESPN / ESPN+ / UFC Fight Pass)
Heavyweight	Chris Daukaus	def.	Parker Porter	TKO (punches and knee)	1	4:28
Featherweight	Kai Kamaka III	def.	Tony Kelley	Decision (unanimous) (29–28, 29–28, 29–28)	3	5:00

== Bonus awards ==
The following fighters received $50,000 bonuses.

- Fight of the Night: Kai Kamaka III vs. Tony Kelley
- Performance of the Night: Daniel Pineda and Virna Jandiroba

== See also ==
- List of UFC events
- List of current UFC fighters
- 2020 in UFC
