= T.J. Brown =

American mixed martial artist (born 1990)

T. J. Brown
- Born: May 22, 1990 (age 36); Pine Bluff, Arkansas, U.S.
- Nickname: Downtown
- Height: 5 ft 9 in (1.75 m)
- Weight: 145 lb (66 kg; 10 st 5 lb)
- Division: Featherweight
- Reach: 72 in (183 cm)
- Fighting out of: Little Rock, Arkansas
- Team: Westside Fight Team; Glory MMA (2021–present)
- Rank: Black belt in Brazilian jiu-jitsu under Roli Delgado
- Years active: 2013–present

Professional boxing record
- Total: 1
- Wins: 1

Mixed martial arts record
- Total: 33
- Wins: 21
- By knockout: 5
- By submission: 12
- By decision: 4
- Losses: 12
- By knockout: 3
- By submission: 5
- By decision: 4

Other information
- Boxing record from BoxRec
- Mixed martial arts record from Sherdog

T. J. Brown (born May 22, 1990) is an American mixed martial artist who formerly competed in the Featherweight division in the Ultimate Fighting Championship (UFC).

== Mixed martial arts career ==
=== Early career ===
Brown made his MMA debut in 2013 at Cage Combat Championships 5, where he lost the bout after he didn't answer the bell at the start of round 2. Brown then compiled a 13–6 record across various regional MMA promotions, most notably losing to Bobby Moffett via split decision at RFA 44: Moisés vs. Freeman and Cody Carrillo via KO in the first round at C3 Fights: Border Wars.

=== Dana White's Tuesday Night Contender Series ===
After pulling off three straight wins on the regional scene, Brown was invited to Dana White's Contender Series and faced Dylan Lockard at Dana White's Contender Series 26 on August 27, 2019. After getting knocked down in the first and having a point deducted in the second round, Brown won the bout via arm-triangle choke in the third round, winning an UFC contract in the process.

=== Ultimate Fighting Championship ===
Brown made his promotional debut against Jordan Griffin at UFC Fight Night: Benavidez vs. Figueiredo on February 29, 2020. He lost the fight via second-round submission.

Brown faced Danny Chavez at UFC 252 on August 15, 2020. At the weigh-ins, Brown weighed 0.5 pound over the non-title fight featherweight limit and forfeited 20 percent of his purse to Chavez. He lost the bout via unanimous decision.

Brown faced Kai Kamaka III at UFC on ESPN: Reyes vs. Procházka on May 1, 2021. After being knocked down in the second round, he won the bout via a controversial split decision. 15 out of 15 media members scored the bout for Kamaka.

Brown was scheduled to face Gabriel Benitez on January 15, 2022, at UFC on ESPN 32. Three days before the event, Benitez was forced to pull out and Charles Rosa replaced him with the bout now taking place at Lightweight. Brown won the fight via unanimous decision.

As the first fight of his new four-fight contract, Brown faced Shayilan Nuerdanbieke on June 25, 2022, at UFC on ESPN 38. He lost the fight via unanimous decision.

Brown faced Erik Silva on December 10, 2022, at UFC 282. He won the fight via submission in round three. This win earned him the Performance of the Night award.

Brown faced Bill Algeo on April 15, 2023, at UFC on ESPN 44. He lost the fight via a rear-naked choke submission in the second round. This fight earned him his second Fight of the Night award.

Brown faced Darren Elkins on October 14, 2023, at UFC Fight Night 230. He lost the fight via a rear-naked choke submission in the third round.

=== Post-UFC ===
Brown faced Rey Trujillo at RDC 10: X on January 20, 2024 and won by first-round submission.

Brown faced Joshua Weems at Gamebred Bareknuckle MMA 7 on March 2, 2024. Brown won by an arm-triangle submission in the second round.

Brown would next face fellow UFC veteran Sheymon Moraes (after stepping in on short notice to replace Canaan Kawaihae) in the co main event of United Fight League 5 on August 30, 2024. He would lose the fight via unanimous decision.

On October 10, 2024, it was reported that Brown was removed from the UFC roster

== Championships and accomplishments ==
=== Mixed martial arts ===
- Ultimate Fighting Championship
  - Fight of the Night (One time) vs. Bill Algeo
  - Performance of the Night (One time) vs. Erik Silva

== Personal life ==
Brown is a single father to a son.

== Mixed martial arts record ==
Professional record breakdown
33 matches	21 wins	12 losses
By knockout	5	3
By submission	12	5
By decision	4	4

Res.	Record	Opponent	Method	Event	Date	Round	Time	Location	Notes
Win	21–12	Dylan Mantello	KO (punches)	Victory Fighting League: The Road to Redemption	December 12, 2025	1	0:18	New York City, New York, United States	
Win	20–12	Antoine Blassingame	Decision (unanimous)	Real Deal Championships 18	January 18, 2025	3	5:00	Little Rock, Arkansas, United States	Super Lightweight bout.
Loss	19–12	Sheymon Moraes	Decision (unanimous)	United Fight League 5	August 30, 2024	3	5:00	Chandler, Arizona, United States	
Win	19–11	Joshua Weems	Submission (arm-triangle choke)	Gamebred Bareknuckle MMA 7	March 2, 2024	2	0:59	Orlando, Florida, United States	Bare Knuckle MMA.
Win	18–11	Rey Trujillo	Submission (rear-naked choke)	RDC 10	January 20, 2024	1	1:49	Hot Springs, Arkansas, United States	Return to Lightweight.
Loss	17–11	Darren Elkins	Submission (rear-naked choke)	UFC Fight Night: Yusuff vs. Barboza	October 14, 2023	3	2:23	Las Vegas, Nevada, United States	
Loss	17–10	Bill Algeo	Submission (rear-naked choke)	UFC on ESPN: Holloway vs. Allen	April 15, 2023	2	1:40	Kansas City, Missouri, United States	Fight of the Night.
Win	17–9	Erik Silva	Submission (arm-triangle choke)	UFC 282	December 10, 2022	3	3:41	Las Vegas, Nevada, United States	Performance of the Night.
Loss	16–9	Shayilan Nuerdanbieke	Decision (unanimous)	UFC on ESPN: Tsarukyan vs. Gamrot	June 25, 2022	3	5:00	Las Vegas, Nevada, United States	
Win	16–8	Charles Rosa	Decision (unanimous)	UFC on ESPN: Kattar vs. Chikadze	January 15, 2022	3	5:00	Las Vegas, Nevada, United States	Lightweight bout.
Win	15–8	Kai Kamaka III	Decision (split)	UFC on ESPN: Reyes vs. Procházka	May 1, 2021	3	5:00	Las Vegas, Nevada, United States	
Loss	14–8	Danny Chavez	Decision (unanimous)	UFC 252	August 15, 2020	3	5:00	Las Vegas, Nevada, United States	Catchweight (146.5 lb) bout; Brown missed weight.
Loss	14–7	Jordan Griffin	Technical Submission (guillotine choke)	UFC Fight Night: Benavidez vs. Figueiredo	February 29, 2020	2	3:38	Norfolk, Virginia, United States	
Win	14–6	Dylan Lockard	Submission (arm-triangle choke)	Dana White's Contender Series 26	August 27, 2019	3	2:59	Las Vegas, Nevada, United States	Brown was deducted a point in round 2 after landing an illegal knee.
Win	13–6	Ken Beverly	KO (head kick)	LFA 67	May 24, 2019	1	1:45	Branson, Missouri, United States	Catchweight (147 lb) bout.
Win	12–6	CJay Hunter	Submission (arm-triangle choke)	Pyramid Fights 11	April 13, 2019	1	4:50	Little Rock, Arkansas, United States	
Win	11–6	Edwin Williams	KO (head kick)	GCF 8	March 9, 2019	1	0:40	Oklahoma City, Oklahoma, United States	
Loss	10–6	Cody Carrillo	KO	C3 Fights: Border Wars	February 10, 2018	1	2:28	Newkirk, Oklahoma, United States	Lightweight bout.
Win	10–5	Peter Barrett	Submission (arm-triangle choke)	Cage Titans 36	November 4, 2017	3	0:35	Plymouth, Massachusetts, United States	
Loss	9–5	Trey Ogden	Submission (rear-naked choke)	LFA 21	September 1, 2017	1	2:27	Branson, Missouri, United States	Lightweight bout.
Win	9–4	Kevin Henry	KO (punches)	360 Fight Club 2	April 15, 2017	1	0:08	Little Rock, Arkansas, United States	
Win	8–4	Tyler Smith	Submission (rear-naked choke)	360 Fight Club 1	February 18, 2017	1	2:54	Little Rock, Arkansas, United States	Lightweight bout.
Loss	7–4	Bobby Moffett	Decision (split)	RFA 46	December 9, 2016	3	5:00	Branson, Missouri, United States	Catchweight (148.5 lb) bout; Brown missed weight.
Loss	7–3	Joey Miolla	Submission (rear-naked choke)	RFA 44	September 30, 2016	2	4:32	St. Charles, Missouri, United States	Return to Featherweight.
Win	7–2	Rodney Allison	Submission (rear-naked choke)	XFI 17	June 25, 2016	1	4:50	Fort Smith, Arkansas, United States	
Win	6–2	Tyrone Paige	Decision (unanimous)	Off The Chain MMA 11	April 2, 2016	3	5:00	Bryant, Arkansas, United States	
Win	5–2	Francisco Olivera	Submission (arm-triangle choke)	RMMA 35	October 16, 2015	3	3:29	New Orleans, Louisiana, United States	
Win	4–2	Tyrone Paige	Submission (arm-triangle choke)	Off The Chain MMA 9	August 22, 2015	1	2:28	Hot Springs, Arkansas, United States	
Loss	3–2	Bobby Taylor	TKO (punches)	RFA vs. Legacy FC 1	May 8, 2015	1	1:56	Robinsonville, Mississippi, United States	Catchweight (150 lb) bout.
Win	3–1	Deartie Tucker III	TKO	Off The Chain MMA 7	February 6, 2015	1	0:28	Little Rock, Arkansas, United States	Catchweight (150 lb) bout.
Win	2–1	Latral Perdue	Submission (rear-naked choke)	V3 Fights: Johnson vs. Kennedy	January 24, 2015	1	0:33	Memphis, Tennessee, United States	Lightweight debut.
Win	1–1	Adrian Walker	Submission (arm-triangle choke)	Off The Chain MMA 6	October 11, 2014	2	2:29	Little Rock, Arkansas, United States	
Loss	0–1	Shelby Graham	TKO (didn't answer the bell for round 2)	Cage Combat Championships 5	November 9, 2013	1	5:00	Paragould, Arkansas, United States	Featherweight debut.

== Professional boxing record ==
2 fights	2 wins	0 losses
By decision	2	0

No.	Result	Record	Opponent	Type	Round, time	Date	Location	Notes
2	Win	2-0	(United States) Travaslo Talley	UD	4	Jun 28, 2024	(United States) Harley Davidson, Little Rock, Arkansas, US	
1	Win	1–0	(United States) Juan Parra	UD	4	Sep 15, 2018	(United States) Clear Channell Metroplex Event Center, Little Rock, Arkansas, US	
