= Luiz Eduardo Garagorri =

Brazilian mixed martial arts fighter

- Born: May 28, 1989 (age 37); Santana do Livramento, Rio Grande do Sul, Brazil
- Height: 5 ft 9 in (1.75 m)
- Weight: 145.5 lb (66 kg; 10 st 6 lb)
- Division: Featherweight
- Reach: 70.0 in (178 cm)
- Fighting out of: Santana do Livramento, Rio Grande do Sul, Brazil
- Team: Fronteira Fight Team
- Years active: 2015–present

Mixed martial arts record
- Total: 19
- Wins: 15
- By knockout: 6
- By submission: 6
- By decision: 3
- Losses: 4
- By knockout: 2
- By submission: 2

Other information
- Mixed martial arts record from Sherdog

Luiz Eduardo Garagorri (born May 28, 1989) is a Brazilian mixed martial artist who competes in the Featherweight division. He competed for the Ultimate Fighting Championship.

== Background ==
Son of a Brazilian father and an Uruguayan mother, Garagorri spends most of his time in Santana do Livramento, a Brazilian city that’s on the other side of the border from the Uruguayan city of Rivera. Garagorri has been fighting professionally since 2015, when he decided to quit his job as a lawyer at his mother’s law firm to dedicate himself full time to martial arts.

== Mixed martial arts career ==
=== Early career ===
Starting his career in 2015, Garagorri compiled a perfect 12–0 record fighting for a variety of regional Uruguayan and Brazilian promotions, before he was scouted by the UFC for their first event in Uruguay at UFC Fight Night: Shevchenko vs. Carmouche 2.

=== Ultimate Fighting Championship ===
Garagorri made his UFC debut against Humberto Bandenay on August 10, 2019 at UFC on ESPN+ 14. He won the fight via unanimous decision.

Garagorri faced Ricardo Ramos on November 16, 2019 at UFC on ESPN+ 22. He lost the fight via a rear-naked choke in round one. A featherweight bout between Mirsad Bektić and Luiz Eduardo Garagorri was scheduled for UFC Fight Night: Covington vs. Woodley. However, Garagorri was pulled from the fight on September 15 after one of his cornermen tested positive for COVID-19. Bektić faced returning veteran Damon Jackson.

Garagorri faced Darren Elkins on November 7, 2020 at UFC on ESPN: Santos vs. Teixeira. He lost the fight via a submission in round three.

On December 8, 2020, it was announced that the UFC had released him.

=== Post-UFC career ===
Garagorri faced the undefeated William de Tarcio at Brazilian Fighting Series 10 on May 29, 2022. Garagorri won the bout, stopping Tarcio via TKO stoppage in the first round.

== Mixed martial arts record ==
Professional record breakdown
19 matches	15 wins	4 losses
By knockout	6	2
By submission	6	2
By decision	3	0

Res.	Record	Opponent	Method	Event	Date	Round	Time	Location	Notes
Loss	15–4	Bruno Azeredo	TKO (punches)	UAE Warriors 55	October 22, 2024	2	3:32	Abu Dhabi, United Arab Emirates	Lightweight debut.
Win	15–3	Wilian Poles	TKO (punches)	UAE Warriors 48	March 3, 2024	3	1:38	Balneário Camboriú, Brazil	Catchweight (160 lb) bout.
Loss	14–3	Kevin Vallejos	TKO (elbows and punches)	Samurai Fight House 11	May 13, 2023	2	3:15	Lomas de Zamora, Argentina	For the SFH Featherweight Championship.
Win	14–2	William de Tarcio	TKO (punches)	Brazilian Fighting Series 10	May 29, 2022	1	2:41	São Paulo, Brazil	
Loss	13–2	Darren Elkins	Submission (rear-naked choke)	UFC on ESPN: Santos vs. Teixeira	November 7, 2020	3	2:22	Las Vegas, Nevada, United States	
Loss	13–1	Ricardo Ramos	Submission (rear-naked choke)	UFC Fight Night: Błachowicz vs. Jacaré	November 16, 2019	1	3:57	São Paulo, Brazil	
Win	13–0	Humberto Bandenay	Decision (unanimous)	UFC Fight Night: Shevchenko vs. Carmouche 2	August 10, 2019	3	5:00	Montevideo, Uruguay	
Win	12–0	Stevens Diogo	Submission (rear-naked choke)	UDC Internacional: Duelo de Leones 4	May 18, 2019	1	2:37	Rivera, Uruguay	
Win	11–0	Agustin Marquez Tejera	TKO (punches)	Fronteira Fight 5	March 9, 2019	1	1:30	Santana do Livramento, Brazil	
Win	10–0	Pablo Sepulveda	Submission (heel hook)	UDC Internacional: Duelo de Leones International	June 9, 2018	1	N/A	Rivera, Uruguay	
Win	9–0	Jose Trindade	Submission	MMA International 2018: Reyno vs. Kakiuchi	February 13, 2018	1	2:40	Punta del Este, Uruguay	
Win	8–0	Rafael Raul Peluffo Cossio	Submission (rear-naked choke)	Rivera Xtreme Challenge 2	October 22, 2017	1	0:30	Rivera, Uruguay	
Win	7–0	Daniel Ferreira dos Santos	Submission (rear-naked choke)	International Thai Stadium 2	April 22, 2017	1	2:02	Santana do Livramento, Brazil	
Win	6–0	Nilton Gaviao	Decision (unanimous)	X-Fest MMA 9	June 11, 2016	3	5:00	Porto Alegre, Brazil	
Win	5–0	Vinicius Trindade	TKO (punches)	Fronteira Fight 4	April 16, 2016	1	2:50	Santana do Livramento, Brazil	
Win	4–0	Victor Rodriguez	Submission (arm-triangle choke)	Duelo de Leones	January 30, 2016	3	3:30	Rivera, Uruguay	
Win	3–0	Manuel Boris	Decision (unanimous)	Final Conflict Championship 10	November 7, 2015	3	5:00	Cordoba, Argentina	
Win	2–0	Edson da Rosa	TKO (punches)	Fronteira Fight 3	July 25, 2015	1	0:40	Santana do Livramento, Brazil	
Win	1–0	Giuliano Primaz	TKO (kick to the body and punches)	Fronteira Fight 2	May 21, 2015	1	0:25	Santana do Livramento, Brazil	

== See also ==
- List of male mixed martial artists
