= Darren Elkins =

American mixed martial arts fighter

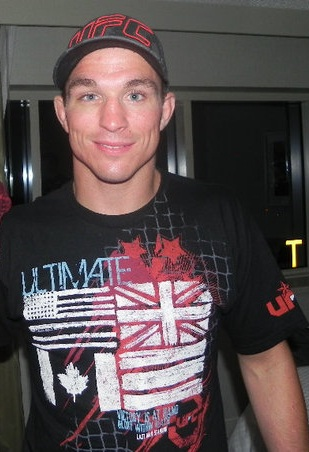
- Born: May 16, 1984 (age 42); Portage, Indiana, U.S.
- Other names: The Damage
- Height: 5 ft 10 in (1.78 m)
- Weight: 145 lb (66 kg; 10.4 st)
- Division: Lightweight (2007–2010); Featherweight (2011–2026)
- Reach: 71 in (180 cm)
- Stance: Orthodox
- Fighting out of: Portage, Indiana, United States
- Team: Duneland Vale Tudo; Team Alpha Male (2015–2026)
- Rank: Black belt in Brazilian Jiu-Jitsu under Chris Holdsworth
- Wrestling: NCAA Division II Wrestling
- Years active: 2007–2026

Mixed martial arts record
- Total: 42
- Wins: 29
- By knockout: 9
- By submission: 6
- By decision: 14
- Losses: 13
- By knockout: 6
- By submission: 1
- By decision: 6

Other information
- Mixed martial arts record from Sherdog

Darren Elkins (born May 16, 1984) is an American former mixed martial artist who competed in the Featherweight division of the Ultimate Fighting Championship (UFC).

== Background ==
Darren Elkins was born and raised in Portage, Indiana. He attended Portage High School and competed in wrestling, placing seventh in the state as a freshman, having qualified for the state competition as a sophomore, placing third as a junior, and became a State Champion as a senior. Elkins also won multiple freestyle wrestling state championships as a youth. Elkins continued wrestling at University of Wisconsin Parkside, but did not finish his education at the university nor earn a degree as he dropped out after two years and decided to pursue a blue collar career when his wife became pregnant with their first child.

== Mixed martial arts career ==
=== Ultimate Fighting Championship ===
Elkins made his UFC debut on the preliminary card of UFC on Versus 1, where he defeated Duane Ludwig via TKO after Ludwig suffered a serious ankle injury after being taken down by Elkins in the first round.

His next bout took place on the preliminary card of UFC on Versus 2 against Charles Oliveira. Elkins took Oliveira down early, but his opponent quickly attempted a triangle choke. Oliveira then transitioned to an armbar, which forced Elkins to submit.

Elkins was expected to face touted prospect Edson Barboza on November 20, 2010, at UFC 123, but Elkins was forced from the card with an injury and replaced by Mike Lullo.

Elkins made his featherweight debut against Michihiro Omigawa on June 11, 2011, at UFC 131. He won the fight via unanimous decision.

Elkins won a unanimous decision over Zhang Tiequan on October 8, 2011, at UFC 136. After several failed guillotine attempts from Zhang, Elkins was able to dominate him from top position including at several points mounting him and pounding away with strikes.

Elkins defeated TUF 14 winner Diego Brandão on May 26, 2012, at UFC 146. Elkins utilized his top game with ground and pound to win the second and third rounds, earning him the unanimous decision victory.

Elkins fought fellow featherweight prospect Steven Siler on November 17, 2012, at UFC 154. After dominating the fight for three rounds, Elkins was awarded the unanimous decision victory, moving him to 4–0 at featherweight and 5–1 overall in the UFC.

Elkins faced Antonio Carvalho on March 16, 2013, at UFC 158. Elkins won via first-round TKO stoppage after landing strikes that rocked Carvalho followed by a knockdown, prompting the referee to intervene.

After taking virtually no damage in the fight against Carvalho, Elkins made a quick return and faced Chad Mendes on April 20, 2013, at UFC on Fox 7, replacing an injured Clay Guida. He lost the fight by 1st-round TKO.

Elkins faced Hatsu Hioki on August 28, 2013, at UFC Fight Night 27. After getting hurt by a body kick late in the first round, Elkins rallied in the last two rounds and won the fight via unanimous decision.

Elkins faced Jeremy Stephens on January 25, 2014, at UFC on Fox 10. He lost the fight via unanimous decision.

Elkins was briefly linked to a matchup with Tatsuya Kawajiri on September 20, 2014, at UFC Fight Night 52, but the bout never materialized as Kawajiri was sidelined indefinitely with a detached retina.

Elkins faced Lucas Martins on October 25, 2014, at UFC 179. He won the fight via split decision.

Elkins faced Hacran Dias on December 20, 2014, at UFC Fight Night 58. Fighting in Brazil for his second straight fight, he lost the fight via unanimous decision, 29-28 across the scorecards.

For a third consecutive fight, Elkins appeared on an international card where he faced Robert Whiteford on October 24, 2015, at UFC Fight Night 76. He won the fight via a dominant unanimous decision.

Elkins next faced Chas Skelly on March 5, 2016, at UFC 196. He won the fight by unanimous decision.

Elkins faced Godofredo Pepey on July 23, 2016, at UFC on Fox 20. He won the fight via unanimous decision.

Elkins faced Mirsad Bektić on March 4, 2017, at UFC 209. After being dominated the first two and a half rounds, Elkins rallied back in the third round and won by knockout due to punches and a head kick. It is widely considered to be one of the greatest comebacks in UFC history. He was awarded a Performance of the Night bonus.

Elkins faced Dennis Bermudez on July 22, 2017, at UFC on Fox 25. He won the back-and-forth fight via split decision.

Elkins faced Michael Johnson on January 14, 2018, at UFC Fight Night 124. He won the fight via rear-naked choke submission in round two. The trademark "Damage" weathered a first round storm to complete the comeback and was awarded a Performance of the Night bonus.

Elkins faced Alexander Volkanovski on July 14, 2018, at UFC Fight Night 133. He lost the fight via unanimous decision.

Elkins faced Ricardo Lamas on November 17, 2018, at UFC Fight Night 140. He lost the fight via TKO in the third round.

Elkins faced Ryan Hall on July 13, 2019, at UFC Fight Night 155. He lost the fight via unanimous decision.

Elkins faced Nate Landwehr on May 16, 2020, at UFC on ESPN 8. He lost the fight via unanimous decision.

Elkins faced Luiz Eduardo Garagorri on November 7, 2020, at UFC on ESPN 17. He won the fight via a submission in round three.

Elkins faced Darrick Minner on July 24, 2021, at UFC on ESPN 27. He won the bout via TKO. This fight earned him the Performance of the Night award.

Elkins faced Cub Swanson on December 18, 2021, at UFC Fight Night 199. He lost the bout via TKO in round one.

Elkins faced Tristan Connelly on April 30, 2022, at UFC on ESPN 35. He won the bout via unanimous decision.

Elkins faced Jonathan Pearce on December 3, 2022, at UFC on ESPN 42. He lost the bout via unanimous decision.

Elkins faced T.J. Brown on October 14, 2023, at UFC Fight Night 230. He won the fight via a rear-naked choke submission in the third round.

Elkins faced Daniel Pineda on October 19, 2024, at UFC Fight Night 245. He won the fight by unanimous decision. This fight earned him his first Fight of the Night award.

Elkins faced Julian Erosa on April 12, 2025, at UFC 314. He lost the fight by technical knockout in the first round.

In his retirement fight, Elkins faced Yadier del Valle on August 8, 2026, at UFC Fight Night 284. He lost the fight by knockout in the first round and retired after the bout.

== Championships and accomplishments ==
- Ultimate Fighting Championship
  - Fight of the Night (One time) vs. Daniel Pineda
  - Performance of the Night (Three times) vs. Mirsad Bektić, Michael Johnson and Darrick Minner
  - Most bouts in UFC Featherweight division history (29)
  - Second most wins in UFC Featherweight division history (18) (behind Max Holloway)
  - Most decision wins in UFC Featherweight division history (12)
    - Most decision bouts in UFC Featherweight division history (18)
  - Most unanimous decision wins in UFC Featherweight division history (10)
    - Tied for sixth most unanimous decision wins in UFC history (10)
  - Most takedowns landed in UFC Featherweight division history (65)
  - Most submission attempts in UFC Featherweight division history (25)
    - Eighth most submission attempts in UFC history (25)
  - Most control time in UFC Featherweight division history (2:08:26)
  - Most top position time in UFC Featherweight division history (1:39:38)
    - Sixth most top position time in UFC history (1:40:05)
  - Second most total fight time in UFC Featherweight division history (5:49:39) (behind Max Holloway)
  - Second most total strikes landed in UFC Featherweight division history (2621) (behind Max Holloway)
    - Fourth most total strikes landed in UFC history (2621) (behind Max Holloway)
  - Fourth most significant strikes landed in UFC Featherweight division history (1190)
  - UFC.com Awards
    - 2017: Ranked #5 Upset of the Year vs. Mirsad Bektić
    - 2018: Ranked #9 Submission of the Year vs. Michael Johnson
- MMA Junkie
  - 2017 #4 Ranked Fight of the Year vs. Mirsad Bektić at UFC 209
  - 2017 Comeback of the Year vs. Mirsad Bektić at UFC 209
- CBS Sports
  - 2017 #2 Ranked UFC Fight of the Year vs. Mirsad Bektić at UFC 209
- Combat Press
  - 2017 Comeback of the Year vs. Mirsad Bektić at UFC 209
- MMA Sucka
  - 2017 Comeback of the Year vs. Mirsad Bektić at UFC 209

== Fighting style ==
Elkins has an extensive wrestling background, which gives him the ability to wear his opponents down as the fight goes on. He is nicknamed “The Damage” due to his ability in taking a lot of punishment early in fights and then rallying to win, which was best showcased during his bout against Mirsad Bektić at UFC 209.

Elkins also claims to abstain from showboating and executing flashy moves during fights, stating "I’m not a great athlete — I’m a good athlete, but I’m not gonna be doing backflips or spinning kicks. But the one thing I do know is the type of fighter I am, and that’s tough, gritty, heart for days, and cardio to where I’m never gonna stop because I don’t have to stop."

== Personal life ==
Elkins and his wife Connie have two children together.

Elkins is known for his blue collar lifestyle, throughout most of his fighting career he has also worked as a pipe fitter. In 2015, Elkins and his family decided to move out west, with Elkins believing he had already completed a decade with Local 597, which would secure retirement and insurance benefits, so they went ahead with the relocation. After spending eight months out West, he discovered that his 2006 apprenticeship year did not count toward the ten years of service. So determined to earn the benefits for his family, Elkins returned home following his win over Godofredo Pepey on July 23, 2015. After a short two-week break, he put in a long stretch of work, logging 92 days on the job out of the next 96 to reach the 900 hours required before year's end.

== Mixed martial arts record ==
Professional record breakdown
42 matches	29 wins	13 losses
By knockout	9	6
By submission	6	1
By decision	14	6

Res.	Record	Opponent	Method	Event	Date	Round	Time	Location	Notes
Loss	29–13	Yadier del Valle	TKO (punch)	UFC Fight Night: Gamrot vs. Salkilld	August 8, 2026	1	0:35	Las Vegas, Nevada, United States	
Loss	29–12	Julian Erosa	TKO (elbow and punches)	UFC 314	April 12, 2025	1	4:15	Miami, Florida, United States	
Win	29–11	Daniel Pineda	Decision (unanimous)	UFC Fight Night: Hernandez vs. Pereira	October 19, 2024	3	5:00	Las Vegas, Nevada, United States	Fight of the Night.
Win	28–11	T.J. Brown	Submission (rear-naked choke)	UFC Fight Night: Yusuff vs. Barboza	October 14, 2023	3	2:23	Las Vegas, Nevada, United States	
Loss	27–11	Jonathan Pearce	Decision (unanimous)	UFC on ESPN: Thompson vs. Holland	December 3, 2022	3	5:00	Orlando, Florida, United States	
Win	27–10	Tristan Connelly	Decision (unanimous)	UFC on ESPN: Font vs. Vera	April 30, 2022	3	5:00	Las Vegas, Nevada, United States	
Loss	26–10	Cub Swanson	TKO (spinning wheel kick and punches)	UFC Fight Night: Lewis vs. Daukaus	December 18, 2021	1	2:12	Las Vegas, Nevada, United States	
Win	26–9	Darrick Minner	TKO (punches)	UFC on ESPN: Sandhagen vs. Dillashaw	July 24, 2021	2	3:48	Las Vegas, Nevada, United States	Performance of the Night.
Win	25–9	Luiz Eduardo Garagorri	Submission (rear-naked choke)	UFC on ESPN: Santos vs. Teixeira	November 7, 2020	3	2:22	Las Vegas, Nevada, United States	
Loss	24–9	Nate Landwehr	Decision (unanimous)	UFC on ESPN: Overeem vs. Harris	May 16, 2020	3	5:00	Jacksonville, Florida, United States	
Loss	24–8	Ryan Hall	Decision (unanimous)	UFC Fight Night: de Randamie vs. Ladd	July 13, 2019	3	5:00	Sacramento, California, United States	
Loss	24–7	Ricardo Lamas	TKO (punches and elbows)	UFC Fight Night: Magny vs. Ponzinibbio	November 17, 2018	3	4:09	Buenos Aires, Argentina	
Loss	24–6	Alexander Volkanovski	Decision (unanimous)	UFC Fight Night: dos Santos vs. Ivanov	July 14, 2018	3	5:00	Boise, Idaho, United States	
Win	24–5	Michael Johnson	Submission (rear-naked choke)	UFC Fight Night: Stephens vs. Choi	January 14, 2018	2	2:22	St. Louis, Missouri, United States	Performance of the Night.
Win	23–5	Dennis Bermudez	Decision (split)	UFC on Fox: Weidman vs. Gastelum	July 22, 2017	3	5:00	Uniondale, New York, United States	
Win	22–5	Mirsad Bektić	KO (punches)	UFC 209	March 4, 2017	3	3:19	Las Vegas, Nevada, United States	Performance of the Night.
Win	21–5	Godofredo Pepey	Decision (unanimous)	UFC on Fox: Holm vs. Shevchenko	July 23, 2016	3	5:00	Chicago, Illinois, United States	Pepey was deducted one point in round 2 due to an illegal knee.
Win	20–5	Chas Skelly	Decision (unanimous)	UFC 196	March 5, 2016	3	5:00	Las Vegas, Nevada, United States	
Win	19–5	Robert Whiteford	Decision (unanimous)	UFC Fight Night: Holohan vs. Smolka	October 24, 2015	3	5:00	Dublin, Ireland	
Loss	18–5	Hacran Dias	Decision (unanimous)	UFC Fight Night: Machida vs. Dollaway	December 20, 2014	3	5:00	Barueri, Brazil	
Win	18–4	Lucas Martins	Decision (split)	UFC 179	October 25, 2014	3	5:00	Rio de Janeiro, Brazil	
Loss	17–4	Jeremy Stephens	Decision (unanimous)	UFC on Fox: Henderson vs. Thomson	January 25, 2014	3	5:00	Chicago, Illinois, United States	
Win	17–3	Hatsu Hioki	Decision (unanimous)	UFC Fight Night: Condit vs. Kampmann 2	August 28, 2013	3	5:00	Indianapolis, Indiana, United States	
Loss	16–3	Chad Mendes	TKO (punches)	UFC on Fox: Henderson vs. Melendez	April 20, 2013	1	1:08	San Jose, California, United States	
Win	16–2	Antonio Carvalho	TKO (punches)	UFC 158	March 16, 2013	1	3:06	Montreal, Quebec, Canada	
Win	15–2	Steven Siler	Decision (unanimous)	UFC 154	November 17, 2012	3	5:00	Montreal, Quebec, Canada	
Win	14–2	Diego Brandão	Decision (unanimous)	UFC 146	May 26, 2012	3	5:00	Las Vegas, Nevada, United States	
Win	13–2	Zhang Tiequan	Decision (unanimous)	UFC 136	October 8, 2011	3	5:00	Houston, Texas, United States	
Win	12–2	Michihiro Omigawa	Decision (unanimous)	UFC 131	June 11, 2011	3	5:00	Vancouver, British Columbia, Canada	Featherweight debut.
Loss	11–2	Charles Oliveira	Submission (armbar)	UFC Live: Jones vs. Matyushenko	August 1, 2010	1	0:41	San Diego, California, United States	
Win	11–1	Duane Ludwig	TKO (ankle injury)	UFC Live: Vera vs. Jones	March 21, 2010	1	0:44	Broomfield, Colorado, United States	
Win	10–1	Gideon Ray	Decision (unanimous)	Hoosier FC 1	November 20, 2009	3	5:00	Valparaiso, Indiana, United States	
Win	9–1	Bryan Neville	TKO (punches)	Total Fight Challenge 17	October 10, 2009	1	1:27	Hammond, Indiana, United States	
Loss	8–1	Ted Worthington	TKO (doctor stoppage)	Duneland Classic 6	September 12, 2009	1	0:13	Crown Point, Indiana, United States	
Win	8–0	Danny Rodriguez	Submission (rear-naked choke)	Total Fight Challenge 15	May 30, 2009	1	1:36	Hammond, Indiana, United States	
Win	7–0	Pat Curran	Decision (unanimous)	Corral's Combat Classic: Domination	November 22, 2008	3	5:00	Hammond, Indiana, United States	Won the C3 Lightweight Championship.
Win	6–0	Kenny Klein	TKO (punches)	Corral's Combat Classic: Summer Fight Fest 3	August 15, 2008	1	1:36	Highland, Indiana, United States	
Win	5–0	Decarlo Johnson	Submission (guillotine choke)	Corral's Combat Classic 2	April 26, 2008	2	0:24	Hammond, Indiana, United States	
Win	4–0	Atsuhiro Tsuboi	Submission (Von Flue choke)	Bodog Fight: Vancouver	August 24, 2007	1	1:55	Vancouver, British Columbia, Canada	
Win	3–0	Daniel Wanderley	TKO (corner stoppage)	International MMA Competition 2	April 21, 2007	1	5:00	Chicago, Illinois, United States	
Win	2–0	Matt Joseph	TKO (punches)	Bourbon Street Brawl 3	April 4, 2007	1	N/A	Chicago, Illinois, United States	
Win	1–0	Jeremy Markam	TKO (submission to punches)	Bourbon Street Brawl 2	January 24, 2007	1	N/A	Chicago, Illinois, United States	Lightweight debut.

== See also ==
- List of male mixed martial artists
