= Daniel Pineda (fighter) =

American mixed martial arts fighter

- Born: August 6, 1985 (age 41); Dallas, Texas, U.S.
- Other names: The Pit
- Height: 5 ft 7 in (1.70 m)
- Weight: 145 lb (66 kg; 10.4 st)
- Division: Welterweight; Lightweight; Featherweight
- Reach: 69 in (175 cm)
- Stance: Orthodox
- Fighting out of: Houston, Texas, United States
- Team: 4oz Fight Club
- Rank: Black belt in Brazilian Jiu-Jitsu
- Years active: 2007–2024

Mixed martial arts record
- Total: 48
- Wins: 28
- By knockout: 9
- By submission: 19
- Losses: 17
- By knockout: 3
- By submission: 6
- By decision: 8
- No contests: 3

Other information
- Mixed martial arts record from Sherdog

Daniel Pineda (born August 6, 1985) is an American former mixed martial artist who competed in the Featherweight division of the Ultimate Fighting Championship. A professional from 2007 to 2024, he also competed for the Professional Fighters League, Bellator, and EliteXC.

== Background ==
Born in Dallas and raised in Waller, Texas, Pineda wrestled in high school for three years before he began training in mixed martial arts at 21.

== Mixed martial arts career ==
=== Legacy Fighting Championship ===
Pineda was the Featherweight Champion of Legacy Fighting Championship. None of his fights with Legacy went to decision with notable wins over fighters such as WEC veteran Frank Gomez. Pineda's fights with Legacy Fighting Championships were always exciting and his last fight with Legacy Fighting Championships before he went to the UFC ended in a TKO by spinning backfist at Legacy Fighting Championships 9.

=== Ultimate Fighting Championship ===
In early January 2012, it was announced that Pineda had been signed to the UFC.

He made his debut on January 20, 2012, at UFC on FX: Guillard vs. Miller against fellow UFC newcomer Pat Schilling. Pineda won the fight via submission in the first round.

Pineda faced Mackens Semerzier on March 3, 2012, at UFC on FX 2, replacing an injured Robbie Peralta. He won the fight via triangle armbar in the first round.

Pineda faced Mike Brown on May 26, 2012, at UFC 146. Pineda lost the bout via unanimous decision.

Pineda faced Antonio Carvalho on July 21, 2012, at UFC 149, replacing an injured George Roop. Pineda lost the fight after he was knocked out for the first time in his professional MMA career.

Pineda returned after a layoff to face Justin Lawrence on April 13, 2013, at The Ultimate Fighter 17 Finale. Pineda won the fight via submission in the first round, earning Submission of the Night honors for his performance.

Pineda faced Diego Brandão on August 17, 2013, at UFC Fight Night 26 He lost the back-and-forth fight via unanimous decision.

Pineda faced Robert Whiteford on March 15, 2014, at UFC 171. He lost the fight via unanimous decision, and was subsequently released from the UFC.

=== Return to Legacy FC ===
Following his UFC release, Pineda re-signed with Legacy Fighting Championships in July 2014.

Pineda faced Leonard Garcia at Legacy FC 37 on November 14, 2014. He won the fight via submission in the first round.

Pineda next faced Thomas Webb at Legacy FC 39 on February 28, 2015. He won the fight via submission early in the first round.

=== Return to Bellator MMA ===
After nearly a six-year absence, Pineda returned to the Bellator MMA promotion in 2016. He faced Emmanuel Sanchez on the main card at Bellator 149 on February 19, 2016. He lost the fight by unanimous decision.

Pineda faced Mark Dickman at Bellator 161 on September 16, 2016. He won the fight via submission in the third round.

Pineda faced Georgi Karakhanyan at Bellator 182 on August 25, 2017. He lost the fight via doctor stoppage in the second round due to a cut.

=== Professional Fighters League ===
Pineda joined Professional Fighters League (PFL) in 2019 and fought Movlid Khaybulaev and Jeremy Kennedy at PFL. He won both of the bouts on the same night; however it was ruled no contest after Pineda failed a drug test and was subsequently suspended and fined $12,500 by NAC.

=== Return to the UFC ===
Pineda re-signed with UFC in June 2020.

Pineda faced Herbert Burns on August 15, 2020, at UFC 252. He won the fight via technical knockout in round two. This win earned him the Performance of the Night award.

Pineda faced Cub Swanson on December 12, 2020, at UFC 256. He lost the fight via knockout in the second round.

Pineda faced Andre Fili on June 26, 2021, at UFC Fight Night 190. Early in round two, Pineda was accidentally poked in the eye and was deemed unable to continue. The fight was declared a no contest.

A urine sample Pineda produced on fight night tested positive for amphetamine, a banned substance under the NAC rules. As a result, Pineda was handed a nine-month suspension in September 2021, retroactive to the positive test. He was also fined a total of $2,554.38, accounting for the violation and subsequent legal fees.

Pineda was scheduled to face Jamall Emmers on May 14, 2022, at UFC on ESPN 36. However, the bout was scrapped in late April for unknown reasons.

Pineda faced Tucker Lutz on March 25, 2023, at UFC on ESPN 43. He won the fight via a guillotine choke submission in the second round. This win earned him the Performance of the Night award.

Pineda faced Alex Caceres on June 3, 2023, at UFC on ESPN 46. He lost the fight via unanimous decision. The win earned Pineda his first Fight of the Night bonus award.

Pineda was scheduled to face Khusein Askhabov on October 7, 2023, at UFC Fight Night 229. However on September 11, Askhabov has been arrested after being connected to the kidnap and torture in Thailand and the bout was cancelled.

Pineda faced Nathaniel Wood on July 27, 2024, at UFC 304. He lost the fight by unanimous decision.

Pineda faced Darren Elkins on October 19, 2024, at UFC Fight Night 245. He lost the fight by unanimous decision and retired from mixed martial arts competition after the bout. This fight earned him another Fight of the Night award.

== Personal life ==
Pineda and his wife have a daughter born in 2020.

== Championships and accomplishments ==
=== Mixed martial arts ===
- Ultimate Fighting Championship
  - Submission of the Night (One time) vs. Justin Lawrence
  - Performance of the Night (Two times) vs. Herbert Burns and Tucker Lutz
  - Fight of the Night (Two times) vs. Alex Caceres & Darren Elkins
  - Tied (Chas Skelly, Makwan Amirkhani, Brian Ortega & Youssef Zalal) for second most submissions in UFC Featherweight division history (4)
  - UFC.com Awards
    - 2020: Ranked #9 Upset of the Year vs. Herbert Burns
- Legacy Fighting Championship
  - Legacy FC Featherweight Championship (One time)
  - Two successful title defenses
- Fury FC
  - Fury FC Interim Featherweight Championship (One time)
  - Fury FC Lightweight Championship (One time)
- Katana Cagefighting
  - KC Featherweight Championship (One time)

== Mixed martial arts record ==
Professional record breakdown
| 48 matches | 28 wins | 17 losses |
| By knockout | 9 | 3 |
| By submission | 19 | 6 |
| By decision | 0 | 8 |
| No contests | 3 | |

| Res. | Record | Opponent | Method | Event | Date | Round | Time | Location | Notes |
|---|---|---|---|---|---|---|---|---|---|
| Loss | 28–17 (3) | Darren Elkins | Decision (unanimous) | UFC Fight Night: Hernandez vs. Pereira | October 19, 2024 | 3 | 5:00 | Las Vegas, Nevada, United States | Fight of the Night. |
| Loss | 28–16 (3) | Nathaniel Wood | Decision (unanimous) | UFC 304 | July 27, 2024 | 3 | 5:00 | Manchester, England | |
| Loss | 28–15 (3) | Alex Caceres | Decision (unanimous) | UFC on ESPN: Kara-France vs. Albazi | June 3, 2023 | 3 | 5:00 | Las Vegas, Nevada, United States | Fight of the Night. |
| Win | 28–14 (3) | Tucker Lutz | Submission (guillotine choke) | UFC on ESPN: Vera vs. Sandhagen | March 25, 2023 | 2 | 2:50 | San Antonio, Texas, United States | Performance of the Night. |
| NC | 27–14 (3) | Andre Fili | NC (accidental eye poke) | UFC Fight Night: Gane vs. Volkov | June 26, 2021 | 2 | 0:46 | Las Vegas, Nevada, United States | Accidental eye poke rendered Pineda unable to continue. |
| Loss | 27–14 (2) | Cub Swanson | KO (punches) | UFC 256 | December 12, 2020 | 2 | 1:52 | Las Vegas, Nevada, United States | |
| Win | 27–13 (2) | Herbert Burns | TKO (elbows) | UFC 252 | August 15, 2020 | 2 | 4:37 | Las Vegas, Nevada, United States | Catchweight (149.5 lb) bout; Burns missed weight. Performance of the Night. |
| NC | 26–13 (2) | Jeremy Kennedy | NC (overturned) | PFL 8 (2019) | October 17, 2019 | 1 | 4:00 | Las Vegas, Nevada, United States | 2019 PFL Featherweight Tournament Semifinal. Originally a submission (guillotine choke) win for Pineda; overturned after he tested positive for a banned substance. |
| NC | 26–13 (1) | Movlid Khaybulaev | NC (overturned) | PFL 8 (2019) | October 17, 2019 | 1 | 0:29 | Las Vegas, Nevada, United States | 2019 PFL Featherweight Tournament Quarterfinal. Originally a TKO (punches) win for Pineda; overturned after he tested positive for a banned substance. |
| Win | 26–13 | Rey Trujillo | TKO (punches) | Fury FC 32 | May 24, 2019 | 1 | 3:32 | Humble, Texas, United States | Return to Featherweight. |
| Win | 25–13 | Elias Rodriguez | Submission (guillotine choke) | Fury FC 28 | December 15, 2018 | 1 | 0:51 | Humble, Texas, United States | Won the Fury FC Lightweight Championship. |
| Win | 24–13 | Dimitre Ivy | Submission (triangle choke) | Fury FC 25 | July 20, 2018 | 1 | 1:10 | Humble, Texas, United States | Won the interim Fury FC Featherweight Championship. |
| Win | 23–13 | Josh Davila | TKO (punches) | LFA 35 | March 9, 2018 | 2 | 0:58 | Houston, Texas, United States | Lightweight bout. |
| Loss | 22–13 | Georgi Karakhanyan | TKO (doctor stoppage) | Bellator 182 | August 25, 2017 | 2 | 4:05 | Verona, New York, United States | |
| Win | 22–12 | Mark Dickman | Submission (rear-naked choke) | Bellator 161 | September 16, 2016 | 3 | 2:07 | Cedar Park, Texas, United States | Return to Featherweight. |
| Loss | 21–12 | Emmanuel Sanchez | Decision (split) | Bellator 149 | February 19, 2016 | 3 | 5:00 | Houston, Texas, United States | Catchweight (150 lb) bout. |
| Win | 21–11 | Jonny Carson | Submission (kimura) | Legacy FC 41 | April 3, 2015 | 3 | 1:45 | Tulsa, Oklahoma, United States | |
| Win | 20–11 | Thomas Webb | Submission (triangle choke) | Legacy FC 39 | February 27, 2015 | 1 | 0:49 | Houston, Texas, United States | Catchweight (150 lb) bout. |
| Win | 19–11 | Leonard Garcia | Submission (kimura) | Legacy FC 37 | November 14, 2014 | 1 | 1:54 | Houston, Texas, United States | Return to Lightweight. |
| Loss | 18–11 | Robert Whiteford | Decision (unanimous) | UFC 171 | March 15, 2014 | 3 | 5:00 | Dallas, Texas, United States | |
| Loss | 18–10 | Diego Brandão | Decision (unanimous) | UFC Fight Night: Shogun vs. Sonnen | August 17, 2013 | 3 | 5:00 | Boston, Massachusetts, United States | |
| Win | 18–9 | Justin Lawrence | Submission (kimura) | The Ultimate Fighter: Team Jones vs. Team Sonnen Finale | April 13, 2013 | 1 | 1:35 | Las Vegas, Nevada, United States | Submission of the Night. |
| Loss | 17–9 | Antonio Carvalho | KO (punches) | UFC 149 | July 21, 2012 | 1 | 1:11 | Calgary, Alberta, Canada | |
| Loss | 17–8 | Mike Brown | Decision (unanimous) | UFC 146 | May 26, 2012 | 3 | 5:00 | Las Vegas, Nevada, United States | |
| Win | 17–7 | Mackens Semerzier | Submission (triangle-armbar) | UFC on FX: Alves vs. Kampmann | March 3, 2012 | 1 | 2:05 | Sydney, Australia | |
| Win | 16–7 | Pat Schilling | Submission (rear-naked choke) | UFC on FX: Guillard vs. Miller | January 20, 2012 | 1 | 1:37 | Nashville, Tennessee, United States | |
| Win | 15–7 | Gilbert Jimenez | TKO (spinning backfist) | Legacy FC 9 | December 16, 2011 | 2 | 1:37 | Houston, Texas, United States | Catchweight (150 lb) bout. |
| Win | 14–7 | Frank Gomez | Submission (rear-naked choke) | Legacy FC 7 | July 22, 2011 | 3 | 2:25 | Houston, Texas, United States | Defended the Legacy FC Featherweight Championship. |
| Win | 13–7 | Ray Blodgett | KO (punch) | Legacy FC 6 | April 9, 2011 | 1 | 0:58 | Houston, Texas, United States | Defended the Legacy FC Featherweight Championship. |
| Win | 12–7 | Levi Forrest | Submission (heel hook) | Legacy FC 5 | January 29, 2011 | 1 | 2:49 | Houston, Texas, United States | Non-title bout. |
| Win | 11–7 | Reynaldo Trujillo | Submission (rear-naked choke) | Legacy Promotions | July 31, 2010 | 1 | 1:58 | Houston, Texas, United States | Won the Legacy FC Featherweight Championship. |
| Loss | 10–7 | Chas Skelly | Submission (kneebar) | Bellator 19 | May 20, 2010 | 2 | 2:16 | Grand Prairie, Texas, United States | |
| Win | 10–6 | James King | TKO (punches) | KOK 8: The Uprising | February 27, 2010 | 1 | 4:30 | Austin, Texas, United States | |
| Win | 9–6 | Douglas Frey | Submission (heel hook) | SWC 9: Redemption | November 28, 2009 | 2 | 1:55 | Frisco, Texas, United States | |
| Loss | 8–6 | Chas Skelly | Submission | SWC 8: Night of Rumble | September 18, 2009 | 1 | 2:12 | Frisco, Texas, United States | |
| Loss | 8–5 | Johnny Bedford | Submission (triangle choke) | SWC 7: Discountenance | June 20, 2009 | 2 | 2:58 | Frisco, Texas, United States | |
| Loss | 8–4 | Kyle Miers | Submission (rear-naked choke) | International Xtreme Fight Association | June 6, 2009 | 1 | 1:24 | Vinton, Louisiana, United States | |
| Loss | 8–3 | Roberto Vargas | Decision (unanimous) | Bellator 6 | May 8, 2009 | 3 | 5:00 | Robstown, Texas, United States | |
| Win | 8–2 | Johnny Bedford | Submission (kneebar) | SWC 3: St. Valentine's Day Massacre | February 21, 2009 | 1 | 2:00 | Frisco, Texas, United States | |
| Win | 7–2 | Ira Evanson | Submission (armbar) | Katana Cagefighting | December 6, 2008 | 2 | 1:22 | Robstown, Texas, United States | Won the Katana Cagefighting Featherweight Championship. |
| Loss | 6–2 | Scott Bear | Submission (choke) | Legacy FC 2 | August 23, 2008 | 2 | N/A | Baton Rouge, Louisiana, United States | |
| Win | 6–1 | Vince Libardi | TKO (punches) | South Coast Promotions | July 18, 2008 | 1 | 1:13 | Houston, Texas, United States | |
| Win | 5–1 | John Alvarez | TKO (punches) | Katana Cagefighting | May 17, 2008 | 2 | 2:04 | Robstown, Texas, United States | |
| Win | 4–1 | Warren Stewart | TKO (punches) | Urban Rumble Championships 1 | April 4, 2008 | 1 | 1:42 | Pasadena, Texas, United States | |
| Loss | 3–1 | Lim Jae-suk | Submission (rear-naked choke) | EliteXC: Renegade | November 10, 2007 | 1 | 2:42 | Corpus Christi, Texas, United States | Welterweight bout. |
| Win | 3–0 | Kierre Gooch | Submission (choke) | Renegades Extreme Fighting | October 20, 2007 | 2 | 0:59 | Houston, Texas, United States | |
| Win | 2–0 | Warren Stewart | Submission (rear-naked choke) | Art of War 2 | May 11, 2007 | 1 | 2:00 | Austin, Texas, United States | |
| Win | 1–0 | Jeremy Mahon | Submission (rear-naked choke) | IFC: Caged Combat | April 13, 2007 | 1 | 1:03 | Corpus Christi, Texas, United States | Lightweight debut. |

== See also ==
- List of male mixed martial artists
