= Ricardo Ramos (fighter) =

Brazilian mixed martial arts fighter

- Born: Ricardo Lucas Ramos; August 1, 1995 (age 31); Campinas, Sao Paulo, Brazil
- Other names: Carcacinha
- Height: 5 ft 9 in (1.75 m)
- Weight: 145 lb (66 kg; 10 st 5 lb)
- Division: Featherweight
- Reach: 72 in (183 cm)
- Fighting out of: Campinas, Sao Paulo, Brazil
- Team: Ramos Team (Brazil); Black Sheep MMA; Team Alpha Male (2017–present)
- Rank: Black belt in Brazilian Jiu-Jitsu
- Years active: 2012–present

Mixed martial arts record
- Total: 25
- Wins: 17
- By knockout: 4
- By submission: 7
- By decision: 6
- Losses: 8
- By knockout: 2
- By submission: 4
- By decision: 2

Other information
- Mixed martial arts record from Sherdog

Ricardo Lucas Ramos (born August 1, 1995) is a Brazilian mixed martial artist who competed in the Featherweight division of the Ultimate Fighting Championship (UFC).

== Background ==
Growing up in Campinas, São Paulo, Brazil, Ramos often got into fights in his teens. His father placed him in Brazilian jiu-jitsu classes, but eventually kicked him out of the home at the age of 14. According to Ramos, he stayed at the mixed martial arts gym from that point to the age of 21.

== Mixed martial arts career ==
=== Early career ===
Ramos made his professional MMA debut in 2012. For the first two years of his career he fought exclusively in his native Brazil and amassed a record of 6 wins and no losses. He made his North American debut in 2015, fighting three times for Legacy FC before it re-branded to Legacy Fighting Alliance. Before joining the UFC, he had a record of 9 wins and 1 loss; all but one of his wins came via stoppage before the final bell.

Ramos was featured on Dana White's Lookin' for a Fight reality show when he submitted Alfred Khashakyan to earn himself a UFC contract.

=== Ultimate Fighting Championship ===
Ramos made his promotional debut at UFC Fight Night 104 against Michinori Tanaka. Ramos won via unanimous decision.

Ramos returned at UFC 217 taking on Aiemann Zahabi. Ramos won via knockout in the third round. He was awarded his first Performance of the Night bonus.

Ramos faced Kang Kyung-ho on August 4, 2018, at UFC 227. He won the fight by split decision.

Ramos was expected to face Ricky Simón on November 10, 2018, at UFC Fight Night 139. However, it was reported on October 16, 2018, that Ramos was pulled from the bout due to hand injury.

Ramos faced Said Nurmagomedov on February 2, 2019, at UFC Fight Night 144. He lost the fight via TKO in the first round.

Ramos was expected to face Sergio Pettis on June 29, 2019, at UFC on ESPN 3. However, on June 15, 2019, it was reported that Pettis pulled out of the bout citing injury, and he was replaced by newcomer Journey Newson. He won the fight via unanimous decision.

Ramos faced Luiz Eduardo Garagorri in a featherweight bout on November 16, 2019, at UFC on ESPN+ 22. He won the fight via a rear-naked choke in round one. This win earned him the Performance of the Night award.

Ramos faced Lerone Murphy on July 16, 2020, at UFC on ESPN: Kattar vs. Ige. He lost the fight via technical knockout in round one.

Ramos was scheduled to face Zubaira Tukhugov on March 13, 2021, at UFC Fight Night 187. A week before the event, Tukhugov pulled out due to undisclosed reasons. Promotion officials elected to remove Ramos from the event.

Ramos was scheduled to face Bill Algeo on April 17, 2021, at UFC on ESPN 22. However, Ramos was pulled from the fight during the week leading up to the event due to COVID-19 protocols. The bout was cancelled, and was rescheduled for UFC Fight Night 188. Ramos won the close bout via unanimous decision. Seven MMA media outlets gave it to Ramos and six media outlets gave it to Algeo.

The bout with Tukhugov was rescheduled and took place on October 30, 2021, at UFC 267. He lost the bout via unanimous decision.

Ramos faced Danny Chavez at UFC on ESPN: Kattar vs. Emmett on June 18, 2022. He won the bout in the first round, knocking out Chavez with a spinning back elbow. This win earned him his third Performance of the Night award.

Ramos was expected to face Danny Henry on September 3, 2022, at UFC Fight Night 209. However, the bout was cancelled after Henry withdrew for unknown reasons.

Ramos was expected to face Austin Lingo in a featherweight bout on March 11, 2023, at UFC Fight Night 221. At the weigh-ins, Ramos came in at 154 pounds, eight pounds over the featherweight non-title fight limit. As a result, his bout with Lingo was cancelled.

Ramos faced Charles Jourdain on September 23, 2023, at UFC Fight Night 228. He lost the fight via guillotine choke in round one.

Ramos faced Julian Erosa on March 23, 2024, at UFC on ESPN 53. The fight resulted in Ramos suffering his second straight loss via a first round guillotine choke.

Ramos faced Joshua Culibao on August 17, 2024, at UFC 305. He won the fight by split decision. 8 out of 12 media outlets scored the bout for Culibao.

Ramos faced Chepe Mariscal on March 1, 2025 at UFC Fight Night 253. He lost the fight by unanimous decision.

Ramos faced Kaan Ofli on October 11, 2025 at UFC Fight Night 261. He lost the fight via a rear-naked choke submission in the first round.

On December 16, 2025, it was reported that Ramos was released by the UFC.

== Championships and achievements ==
=== Mixed martial arts ===
- Elite Fighting Championship
  - EFC Bantamweight Championship (One Time)
- Ultimate Fighting Championship
  - Performance of the Night (Three times) vs. Aiemann Zahabi, Luiz Eduardo Garagorri, and Danny Chavez
  - UFC.com Awards
    - 2017: Ranked #6 Knockout of the Year vs. Aiemann Zahabi

== Mixed martial arts record ==
Professional record breakdown
25 matches	17 wins	8 losses
By knockout	4	2
By submission	7	4
By decision	6	2

Res.	Record	Opponent	Method	Event	Date	Round	Time	Location	Notes
Loss	17–8	Kaan Ofli	Submission (rear-naked choke)	UFC Fight Night: Oliveira vs. Gamrot	October 11, 2025	1	3:02	Rio de Janeiro, Brazil	
Loss	17–7	Chepe Mariscal	Decision (unanimous)	UFC Fight Night: Kape vs. Almabayev	March 1, 2025	3	5:00	Las Vegas, Nevada, United States	
Win	17–6	Joshua Culibao	Decision (split)	UFC 305	August 18, 2024	3	5:00	Perth, Australia	
Loss	16–6	Julian Erosa	Submission (guillotine choke)	UFC on ESPN: Ribas vs. Namajunas	March 23, 2024	1	2:15	Las Vegas, Nevada, United States	
Loss	16–5	Charles Jourdain	Submission (guillotine choke)	UFC Fight Night: Fiziev vs. Gamrot	September 23, 2023	1	3:12	Las Vegas, Nevada, United States	
Win	16–4	Danny Chavez	KO (spinning back elbow)	UFC on ESPN: Kattar vs. Emmett	June 18, 2022	1	1:12	Austin, Texas, United States	Performance of the Night.
Loss	15–4	Zubaira Tukhugov	Decision (unanimous)	UFC 267	October 30, 2021	3	5:00	Abu Dhabi, United Arab Emirates	
Win	15–3	Bill Algeo	Decision (unanimous)	UFC Fight Night: Font vs. Garbrandt	May 22, 2021	3	5:00	Las Vegas, Nevada, United States	
Loss	14–3	Lerone Murphy	TKO (punches)	UFC on ESPN: Kattar vs. Ige	July 16, 2020	1	4:18	Abu Dhabi, United Arab Emirates	
Win	14–2	Luiz Eduardo Garagorri	Submission (rear-naked choke)	UFC Fight Night: Błachowicz vs. Jacaré	November 16, 2019	1	3:57	São Paulo, Brazil	Return to Featherweight. Performance of the Night.
Win	13–2	Journey Newson	Decision (unanimous)	UFC on ESPN: Ngannou vs. dos Santos	June 29, 2019	3	5:00	Minneapolis, Minnesota, United States	
Loss	12–2	Said Nurmagomedov	TKO (spinning back kick and punches)	UFC Fight Night: Assunção vs. Moraes 2	February 2, 2019	1	2:28	Fortaleza, Brazil	
Win	12–1	Kang Kyung-ho	Decision (split)	UFC 227	August 4, 2018	3	5:00	Los Angeles, California, United States	
Win	11–1	Aiemann Zahabi	KO (spinning back elbow)	UFC 217	November 4, 2017	3	1:58	New York City, New York, United States	Performance of the Night.
Win	10–1	Michinori Tanaka	Decision (unanimous)	UFC Fight Night: Bermudez vs. The Korean Zombie	February 4, 2017	3	5:00	Houston, Texas, United States	
Win	9–1	Alfred Khashakyan	Submission (rear-naked choke)	New England Fights: Dana White Lookin' for a Fight	August 5, 2016	2	2:10	Bangor, Maine, United States	
Loss	8–1	Manny Vazquez	Submission (rear-naked choke)	Legacy FC 51	February 5, 2016	1	1:45	Hinckley, Minnesota, United States	For the vacant Legacy FC Bantamweight Championship.
Win	8–0	Cody Walker	Submission (triangle armbar)	Legacy FC 46	October 2, 2015	1	2:39	Allen, Texas, United States	Featherweight bout.
Win	7–0	Justin Rader	TKO (punches)	Legacy FC 41	April 3, 2015	1	0:32	Tulsa, Oklahoma, United States	Return to Bantamweight.
Win	6–0	Fabio Lima	Submission (triangle choke)	MMA Super Heroes 4	May 30, 2014	3	1:49	Valinhos, Brazil	Catchweight (137 lb) bout.
Win	5–0	Rafael Correa	Submission (rear-naked choke)	Circuito Talent de MMA 8	April 12, 2014	1	2:38	São Paulo, Brazil	
Win	4–0	Lucas Mascena	Submission (armbar)	Circuito Talent de MMA 5	November 23, 2013	1	1:59	Campinas, Brazil	Return to Featherweight.
Win	3–0	Allan Nascimento	Decision (unanimous)	Elite FC 5	October 5, 2013	3	5:00	Campinas, Brazil	Bantamweight debut. Won the Elite FC Bantamweight Championship.
Win	2–0	William Oliveira	TKO (knee and punches)	Supreme FC 1	December 1, 2012	1	0:30	Campinas, Brazil	
Win	1–0	Josivaldo Moreno	Submission (triangle choke)	CT Fight 1	May 19, 2012	1	0:58	Indaiatuba, Brazil	Featherweight debut.

== See also ==
- List of male mixed martial artists
