= Danny Chavez =

American mixed martial artist

- Born: March 14, 1987 (age 39); Queens, New York, United States
- Other names: The Colombian Warrior
- Nationality: Colombian-American
- Height: 5 ft 8 in (1.73 m)
- Weight: 145 lb (66 kg; 10.4 st)
- Division: Featherweight
- Reach: 67 in (170 cm)
- Team: MMA Masters
- Rank: Black belt in Brazilian Jiu-Jitsu under Daniel Valverde
- Years active: 2010–present

Mixed martial arts record
- Total: 18
- Wins: 12
- By knockout: 3
- By submission: 1
- By decision: 8
- Losses: 5
- By knockout: 1
- By submission: 1
- By decision: 3
- Draws: 1

Other information
- Mixed martial arts record from Sherdog

Danny Chavez (born March 14, 1987) is an American mixed martial artist who competes in Featherweight division. A professional since 2010, he most notably fought in the Ultimate Fighting Championship (UFC).

== Background ==
Born in Queens, New York, Chavez went to live in Miami when he was five years old. Two years later he went to Bogotá to live with his father. He lived there until he was 14 in the neighbourhood of Kennedy. He picked up mixed martial arts at the age of 19, when his friend Alex Bermudez showed himThe Ultimate Fighter: Season 3. After enjoying the show, he searched through the Yellow Pages for a school and found one that was advertising Muay Thai, Jiu-Jitsu, and wrestling. After two years, a friend told him about a school and that's when he joined MMA Masters.

== Mixed martial arts career ==
=== Early career ===
Starting his career in 2010, Chavez started out his professional career fighting on the regional Florida scene, being selected to compete in the Championship Fighting Alliance Undefeated Featherweight Tournament after three straight wins to start his career, including a unanimous decision win in his CFA debut against Justin Steave at CFA 3: Howard vs. Olson on October 9, 2011.

Chavez next faced Humberto Rodriguez at CFA 4: Izquierdo vs. Cenoble on December 17, 2011, in the semifinal round of the promotions undefeated featherweight tournament. He won the fight via unanimous decision to secure his place in the finals.

Chavez faced off against Jordan Parsons in the finals, which took place at CFA 5: Chavez vs. Parsons on February 24, 2012, for the featherweight title. He lost the fight via unanimous decision after five rounds.

He would continue fighting on the Florida scene, picking up three straight decision wins, before dropping two straight fights in 2016. Chavez did not see any action in 2017 but later returned in 2018 to start his three-fight win streak which were all won by knockout inside the first round, culminating in Chavez fighting under the Global Legion Fighting Championship promotion, in which he knocked out Dylan Cala to become the new GLFC featherweight champion.

=== Ultimate Fighting Championship ===
In his UFC debut, Chavez faced T.J. Brown at UFC 252 on August 15, 2020. He won the bout via unanimous decision.

In his sophomore appearance in the organization, Chavez faced Jared Gordon on February 20, 2021, at UFC Fight Night 185. At the weigh-ins, Gordon weighed in at 150 pounds, four pounds over the featherweight non-title fight limit. Gordon was fined 30% of his purse which went to Chavez and the bout proceeded at catchweight. Chavez lost the fight via unanimous decision.

Chavez was scheduled to face Doo Ho Choi on July 31, 2021, at UFC on ESPN 28. However, Choi had to pull out of the bout due to injury and was replaced by Kai Kamaka III. The fight ended up with the result of majority draw.

Chavez faced Ricardo Ramos at UFC on ESPN: Kattar vs. Emmett on June 18, 2022. He lost the bout in the first round, getting knocked out with a spinning back elbow.

On August 8, 2022, it was announced that Chavez was no longer on the UFC roster.

== Championships and accomplishments ==
- Global Legion FC
  - GLFC Featherweight Championship (One time)

== Mixed martial arts record ==
Professional record breakdown
18 matches	12 wins	5 losses
By knockout	3	1
By submission	1	1
By decision	8	3
Draws	1	

Res.	Record	Opponent	Method	Event	Date	Round	Time	Location	Notes
Win	12–5–1	Bruno Conti	Submission (rear-naked choke)	Empire MMA 15	June 6, 2026	1	2:01	Bogotá, Colombia	
Loss	11–5–1	Ricardo Ramos	KO (spinning back elbow)	UFC on ESPN: Kattar vs. Emmett	June 18, 2022	1	1:12	Austin, Texas, United States	
Draw	11–4–1	Kai Kamaka III	Draw (majority)	UFC on ESPN: Hall vs. Strickland	July 31, 2021	3	5:00	Las Vegas, Nevada, United States	Kamaka was deducted one point in round 2 for an eye poke and a groin strike.
Loss	11–4	Jared Gordon	Decision (unanimous)	UFC Fight Night: Blaydes vs. Lewis	February 20, 2021	3	5:00	Las Vegas, Nevada, United States	Catchweight (150 lb) bout; Gordon missed weight.
Win	11–3	T.J. Brown	Decision (unanimous)	UFC 252	August 15, 2020	3	5:00	Las Vegas, Nevada, United States	Catchweight (146.5 lb) bout; Brown missed weight.
Win	10–3	Dylan Cala	KO	Global Legion FC 14	July 18, 2020	1	2:24	Clearwater, Florida, United States	Won the GLFC Featherweight Championship.
Win	9–3	Felipe Vargas	TKO (head kick)	XFN 22	December 15, 2018	1	2:50	Fort Lauderdale, Florida, United States	
Win	8–3	Leandro Magalhães	KO (punches)	Shogun Fights	March 17, 2018	1	4:08	Hollywood, Florida, United States	
Loss	7–3	Adi Alić	Decision (unanimous)	Fight Time 31	June 24, 2016	3	5:00	Miami, Florida, United States	
Loss	7–2	Jason Soares	Submission (guillotine choke)	Fight Time 29	February 12, 2016	5	2:32	Miami, Florida, United States	For the Fight Time Featherweight Championship.
Win	7–1	John De Jesus	Decision (unanimous)	Fight Time 27	September 18, 2015	3	5:00	Miami, Florida, United States	
Win	6–1	Anderson Hutchinson	Decision (split)	HOF: Nations Collide	March 13, 2015	3	5:00	Coral Gables, Florida, United States	
Win	5–1	Chino Duran	Decision (unanimous)	CFA 8: Araujo vs. Bradley	October 6, 2012	3	5:00	Miami, Florida, United States	
Loss	4–1	Jordan Parsons	Decision (unanimous)	CFA 5: Chavez vs. Parsons	February 24, 2012	5	5:00	Miami, Florida, United States	CFA Undefeated Featherweight Tournament Final; For the CFA Featherweight Championship.
Win	4–0	Humberto Rodriguez	Decision (unanimous)	CFA 4: Izquierdo vs. Cenoble	December 17, 2011	3	5:00	Miami, Florida, United States	CFA Undefeated Featherweight Tournament Semifinal.
Win	3–0	Justin Steave	Decision (unanimous)	CFA 3: Howard vs Olson	October 9, 2011	3	5:00	Miami, Florida, United States	
Win	2–0	Casey Phelps	Decision (unanimous)	Mixed Fighting Alliance 5	May 6, 2011	3	5:00	Miami, Florida, United States	
Win	1–0	Nelson Lopez	Decision (unanimous)	G-Force Fights 3	February 4, 2010	3	5:00	Miami, Florida, United States	

== See also ==
- List of male mixed martial artists
- Cage Fury Fighting Championships
