= UFC Fight Night: Blaydes vs. Lewis =

UFC mixed martial arts event in 2021

- The poster for UFC Fight Night: Blaydes vs. Lewis
- Promotion: Ultimate Fighting Championship
- Date: February 20, 2021
- Venue: UFC Apex
- City: Enterprise, Nevada, United States
- Attendance: None (behind closed doors)

Event chronology
UFC 258: Usman vs. Burns	UFC Fight Night: Blaydes vs. Lewis	UFC Fight Night: Rozenstruik vs. Gane

UFC Fight Night: Blaydes vs. Lewis (also known as UFC Fight Night 185, UFC on ESPN+ 43 and UFC Vegas 19) was a mixed martial arts event produced by the Ultimate Fighting Championship that took place on February 20, 2021 at the UFC Apex facility in Enterprise, Nevada, part of the Las Vegas Metropolitan Area, United States.

== Background ==
A heavyweight bout between Curtis Blaydes and former UFC Heavyweight Championship challenger Derrick Lewis headlined this event. They were initially scheduled to serve as the headliner for UFC on ESPN: Smith vs. Clark in November, but the contest was scrapped due to Blaydes testing positive for COVID-19.

A women's bantamweight bout between Ketlen Vieira and former Invicta FC Bantamweight Champion and UFC Women's Featherweight Championship challenger Yana Kunitskaya took place at this event. They were initially scheduled to meet at UFC Fight Night: Brunson vs. Shahbazyan in August 2020, but then moved to UFC Fight Night: Lewis vs. Oleinik a week later. In turn, Vieira had to pull out due to visa issues.

A heavyweight bout between Serghei Spivac and Jared Vanderaa was initially scheduled to take place at UFC 256, but Vanderaa tested positive for COVID-19 and was forced to withdraw from the event. The pairing was then rescheduled for this event.

A bantamweight bout between Aiemann Zahabi and Drako Rodriguez took place at the event. The pairing was previously scheduled to take place in December of 2020 at UFC Fight Night: Thompson vs. Neal, but it was scrapped in the days leading up to that event after Zahabi tested positive for COVID-19.

A middleweight bout between Phil Hawes and Nassourdine Imavov originally expected to take place at UFC on ABC: Holloway vs. Kattar, but was scrapped due to undisclosed reasons just a few hours before the event. They met at this event.

A featherweight bout between Michael Trizano and Rafael Alves was scheduled for the event. However on February 9, news surfaced that Trizano was forced to withdraw from the bout due to an ankle injury. He was replaced by promotional newcomer Pat Sabatini.

Jai Herbert was expected to face Drakkar Klose in a lightweight bout at this event. However, Hebert pulled out in the weeks leading up to the event and was replaced by Luis Peña. A few hours before the event, the bout was canceled after one of Klose's cornermen tested positive for COVID-19.

At the weigh-ins, Ketlen Vieira, Jared Gordon, Drako Rodriguez and Rafael Alves missed weight for their respective bouts. Vieira weighed in at 138 pounds, two pounds over the women's bantamweight non-title fight limit. Gordon weighed in at 150 pounds, four pounds over the featherweight non-title fight limit. Rodriguez weighed in at 140.5 pounds, four and a half pounds over the bantamweight non-title fight limit. All of their bouts proceeded at catchweight and Vieira was fined 20% of her individual purse, while Gordon and Rodriguez were fined 30% each, which went to their opponents Yana Kunitskaya, Danny Chavez and Aiemann Zahabi respectively. Alves weighed in at 157.5 pounds, eleven and a half pounds over the featherweight non-title limit, marking the heaviest weight-miss in UFC history. His bout against Pat Sabatini was canceled as a result of it.

A featherweight bout between Chas Skelly and Jamall Emmers was expected to place at the event. However, the bout was canceled moments before it was expected to begin as Emmers suffered back spasms backstage rendering him unable to compete.

== Results ==
Main card (ESPN+)
Weight class				Method	Round	Time	Notes
Heavyweight	Derrick Lewis	def.	Curtis Blaydes	KO (punch)	2	1:26
Catchweight (138 lb)	Yana Kunitskaya	def.	Ketlen Vieira	Decision (unanimous) (29–28, 29–28, 29–28)	3	5:00
Featherweight	Darrick Minner	def.	Charles Rosa	Decision (unanimous) (30–26, 30–27, 29–27)	3	5:00
Heavyweight	Chris Daukaus	def.	Aleksei Oleinik	TKO (punches)	1	1:55
Middleweight	Phil Hawes	def.	Nassourdine Imavov	Decision (majority) (28–28, 29–28, 29–28)	3	5:00
Heavyweight	Tom Aspinall	def.	Andrei Arlovski	Submission (rear-naked choke)	2	1:09
Preliminary card (ESPN+)
Catchweight (150 lb)	Jared Gordon	def.	Danny Chavez	Decision (unanimous) (30–27, 30–27, 29–28)	3	5:00
Bantamweight	John Castañeda	def.	Eddie Wineland	TKO (punches)	1	4:44
Featherweight	Julian Erosa	def.	Nate Landwehr	TKO (flying knee)	1	0:56
Women's Flyweight	Casey O'Neill	def.	Shana Dobson	TKO (punches)	2	3:41
Catchweight (140.5 lb)	Aiemann Zahabi	def.	Drako Rodriguez	KO (punch)	1	3:05
Heavyweight	Serghei Spivac	def.	Jared Vanderaa	TKO (punches)	2	4:32

== Bonus awards ==
The following fighters received $50,000 bonuses.

- Fight of the Night: No bonus awarded.
- Performance of the Night: Derrick Lewis, Chris Daukaus, Tom Aspinall and Aiemann Zahabi

== See also ==
- List of UFC events
- List of current UFC fighters
- 2021 in UFC
