= UFC on ESPN: Kattar vs. Chikadze =

UFC mixed martial arts event in 2022

- The poster for UFC on ESPN: Kattar vs. Chikadze
- Promotion: Ultimate Fighting Championship
- Date: January 15, 2022
- Venue: UFC Apex
- City: Enterprise, Nevada, United States
- Attendance: Not announced

Event chronology
UFC Fight Night: Lewis vs. Daukaus	UFC on ESPN: Kattar vs. Chikadze	UFC 270: Ngannou vs. Gane

UFC on ESPN: Kattar vs. Chikadze (also known as UFC on ESPN 32 and UFC Vegas 46) was a mixed martial arts event produced by the Ultimate Fighting Championship that took place on January 15, 2022 at the UFC Apex facility in Enterprise, Nevada, part of the Las Vegas Metropolitan Area, United States.

== Background ==
A featherweight bout between Calvin Kattar and Giga Chikadze headlined the event.

A women's flyweight bout between Kay Hansen and Jasmine Jasudavicius was scheduled for the event. However, the pairing was moved to UFC 270 due to undisclosed reasons.

Ashley Yoder was expected to face Vanessa Demopoulos in a women's strawweight bout at the event. Yoder eventually withdrew due to undisclosed reasons and was replaced by Silvana Gomez Juarez. The bout was pushed back to UFC 270 a few days before the event.

A middleweight bout between Joaquin Buckley and Abdul Razak Alhassan was scheduled for the event. However, the pairing was cancelled after Alhassan withdrew for undisclosed reasons. The duo was rescheduled for UFC Fight Night 201 a month later.

A flyweight between Kleydson Rodrigues and Zarrukh Adashev was scheduled for the event. However, in early January 2022, it was reported that the bout was canceled as Rodrigues has tested positive for influenza (H3N2) and Adashev has suffered an injury.

A welterweight bout between Muslim Salikhov and Michel Pereira was scheduled for the event. However, Salikhov withdrew from the bout for undisclosed reasons and the bout was cancelled. Pereira was rescheduled against André Fialho for UFC 270.

A featherweight bout between T.J. Brown and Gabriel Benitez was scheduled for the event. Three days before the event, Benitez was forced to pull out and Charles Rosa replaced him, therefore changing the contest to the lightweight division.

Saidyokub Kakhramonov was scheduled to meet Brian Kelleher in a bantamweight bout. However, Kakhramonov withdrew from the bout due to undisclosed reasons and was replaced by Kevin Croom, shifting the contest to the featherweight division.

== Results ==
Main card (ESPN / ESPN+)
Weight class				Method	Round	Time	Notes
Featherweight	Calvin Kattar	def.	Giga Chikadze	Decision (unanimous) (50–45, 50–45, 50–44)	5	5:00
Heavyweight	Jake Collier	def.	Chase Sherman	Submission (rear-naked choke)	1	2:26
Flyweight	Brandon Royval	def.	Rogério Bontorin	Decision (split) (29–28, 28–29, 29–28)	3	5:00
Women's Flyweight	Katlyn Chookagian	def.	Jennifer Maia	Decision (unanimous) (30–27, 30–27, 30–27)	3	5:00
Lightweight	Viacheslav Borshchev	def.	Dakota Bush	TKO (punch to the body)	1	3:47
Featherweight	Bill Algeo	def.	Joanderson Brito	Decision (unanimous) (30–27, 29–28, 29–28)	3	5:00
Preliminary card (ESPN+)
Middleweight	Jamie Pickett	def.	Joseph Holmes	Decision (unanimous) (29–28, 29–28, 29–28)	3	5:00
Welterweight	Court McGee	def.	Ramiz Brahimaj	Decision (unanimous) (30–27, 30–27, 30–27)	3	5:00
Featherweight	Brian Kelleher	def.	Kevin Croom	Decision (unanimous) (30–27, 30–27, 29–28)	3	5:00
Lightweight	T.J. Brown	def.	Charles Rosa	Decision (unanimous) (29–28, 29–28, 29–28)	3	5:00

== Bonus awards ==
The following fighters received $50,000 bonuses.

- Fight of the Night: Calvin Kattar vs. Giga Chikadze
- Performance of the Night: Jake Collier and Viacheslav Borshchev

== See also ==
- List of UFC events
- List of current UFC fighters
- 2022 in UFC
