= UFC on ESPN: Blanchfield vs. Fiorot =

2024 mixed martial event in Nevada, US

- The poster for UFC on ESPN: Blanchfield vs. Fiorot
- Promotion: Ultimate Fighting Championship
- Date: March 30, 2024
- Venue: Boardwalk Hall
- City: Atlantic City, New Jersey, United States
- Attendance: 12,198
- Total gate: $2,180,601

Event chronology
UFC on ESPN: Ribas vs. Namajunas	UFC on ESPN: Blanchfield vs. Fiorot	UFC Fight Night: Allen vs. Curtis 2

UFC on ESPN: Blanchfield vs. Fiorot (also known as UFC on ESPN 54) was a mixed martial arts event produced by the Ultimate Fighting Championship that took place on March 30, 2024, at Boardwalk Hall in Atlantic City, New Jersey, United States.

== Background ==
The event marked the promotion's tenth visit to Atlantic City and first since UFC Fight Night: Barboza vs. Lee in April 2018.

A women's flyweight bout between Erin Blanchfield and Manon Fiorot headlined the event. The bout was promoted to main event status when the original announced headliner, a welterweight bout between Sean Brady and Vicente Luque, fell through when Brady indicated he never signed a bout agreement due to dealing with an injury. Luque was instead matched up with Joaquin Buckley in the co-main event.

A light heavyweight bout between former UFC Light Heavyweight Championship challenger Dominick Reyes and Carlos Ulberg was scheduled UFC 297, but it was postponed due to an injury sustained by Ulberg and was rescheduled for this event. However, Reyes pulled out due to deep vein thrombosis and was replaced by Alonzo Menifield. In turn, the promotion opted to move the pairing to UFC on ESPN 56 on May 11 due to undisclosed reasons.

A featherweight bout between Nate Landwehr and Pat Sabatini was expected to take place at the event. However, Sabatini withdrew for unknown reasons and was replaced by Jamall Emmers.

At the weigh ins, Julio Arce weighed in at 147.25 pounds, one and a quarter pounds over the featherweight non-title fight limit. His bout proceeded at catchweight and he was fined 20 percent of his purse which went to his opponent Herbert Burns.

A women's flyweight bout between Viktoriia Dudakova and Melissa Gatto was scheduled for this event. Despite both women weighing in, the bout was cancelled during the broadcast due to a Dudakova illness.

== Results ==
Main card (ESPN / ESPN+)
Weight class				Method	Round	Time	Notes
Women's Flyweight	Manon Fiorot	def.	Erin Blanchfield	Decision (unanimous) (50–45, 50–45, 50–45)	5	5:00
Welterweight	Joaquin Buckley	def.	Vicente Luque	TKO (punches)	2	3:17
Middleweight	Chris Weidman	def.	Bruno Silva	Technical Decision (unanimous) (30–27, 30–27, 30–27)	3	2:18	(Note: Originally ruled a TKO (punches) win for Weidman; changed to a decision by the athletic commission due to Silva suffering an eye poke leading to the stoppage.)
Middleweight	Nursulton Ruziboev	def.	Sedriques Dumas	TKO (punches)	1	3:18
Featherweight	Kyle Nelson	def.	Bill Algeo	TKO (punches)	1	4:00
Welterweight	Chidi Njokuani	def.	Rhys McKee	Decision (split) (28–29, 30–27, 30–27)	3	5:00
Preliminary card (ESPN2 / ESPN+)
Featherweight	Nate Landwehr	def.	Jamall Emmers	KO (punches)	1	4:43
Women's Strawweight	Virna Jandiroba	def.	Loopy Godínez	Decision (unanimous) (29–28, 29–28, 30–27)	3	5:00
Catchweight (147.25 lb)	Julio Arce	def.	Herbert Burns	TKO (punches)	2	2:00	(Note: Burns was deducted 1 point in round 1 due to repeated illegal groin strikes.)
Featherweight	Dennis Buzukja	def.	Connor Matthews	TKO (punches)	3	0:22
Light Heavyweight	Ibo Aslan	def.	Anton Turkalj	TKO (punch)	3	1:32
Middleweight	Jacob Malkoun	def.	Andre Petroski	TKO (soccer kick to the body)	2	0:39
Bantamweight	Caolán Loughran	def.	Angel Pacheco	Decision (unanimous) (30–27, 30–27, 30–26)	3	5:00

== Bonus awards ==
The following fighters received $50,000 bonuses.

- Fight of the Night: Ibo Aslan vs. Anton Turkalj
- Performance of the Night: Nate Landwehr and Dennis Buzukja

== See also ==
- 2024 in UFC
- List of current UFC fighters
- List of UFC events
