= UFC on ABC: Ortega vs. Rodríguez =

Mixed martial arts event in 2022

- The poster for UFC on ABC: Ortega vs. Rodríguez
- Promotion: Ultimate Fighting Championship
- Date: July 16, 2022
- Venue: UBS Arena
- City: Elmont, New York, United States
- Attendance: 16,979
- Total gate: $2,110,000

Event chronology
| UFC on ESPN: dos Anjos vs. Fiziev | UFC on ABC: Ortega vs. Rodríguez | UFC Fight Night: Blaydes vs. Aspinall |

UFC on ABC: Ortega vs. Rodríguez (also known as UFC on ABC 3) was a mixed martial arts event produced by the Ultimate Fighting Championship that took place on July 16, 2022, at UBS Arena in Elmont, New York in the United States.

== Background ==
A featherweight bout between former UFC Featherweight Championship challenger Brian Ortega and The Ultimate Fighter: Latin America featherweight winner Yair Rodríguez headlined the event.

A flyweight bout between former UFC Flyweight Championship challenger Alex Perez and Askar Askarov was expected to take place at the event. The pair was previously scheduled to meet at UFC on ESPN: Hall vs. Strickland in July 2021, but Askarov pulled out citing injury. Askarov pulled out once again in early June due to undisclosed reasons and Perez was rescheduled against Alexandre Pantoja at UFC 277.

A women’s strawweight bout between former UFC Women's Strawweight Championship challenger and inaugural Invicta FC Atomweight Champion Jessica Penne and former Invicta FC Strawweight Champion Brianna Fortino was expected to take place at the event. However, Fortino withdrew in early June for unknown reasons and was replaced by another former Invicta FC Strawweight Champion in Emily Ducote.

A women's flyweight bout between former Strikeforce and UFC Women's Bantamweight Champion Miesha Tate and former Invicta FC Bantamweight Champion (also former UFC Women's Flyweight Championship challenger) Lauren Murphy was originally expected for UFC on ESPN: Błachowicz vs. Rakić but was then shifted to UFC 276 for unknown reasons. In turn, a week before that event, Murphy pulled out after she tested positive for COVID-19. They were then rescheduled for this event.

A couple of featherweight bouts featuring Bill Algeo vs. Billy Quarantillo and Herbert Burns vs. Khusein Askhabov were scheduled for this event. However, after both Quarantillo and Askhabov pulled out due to injury, Burns and Algeo were booked against each other.

Philip Rowe and Abubakar Nurmagomedov were expected to meet in a welterweight contest. However, the pairing was cancelled due to complications on both sides. Rowe has been forced to withdraw due to an injury, while Nurmagomedov pulled out due to alleged visa issues which restricted his travel.

== Results ==
Main card (ABC / ESPN+)
| Weight class | | | | Method | Round | Time | Notes |
|---|---|---|---|---|---|---|---|
| Featherweight | Yair Rodríguez | def. | Brian Ortega | TKO (shoulder injury) | 1 | 4:11 |
| Women's Strawweight | Amanda Lemos | def. | Michelle Waterson | Submission (guillotine choke) | 2 | 1:48 |
| Welterweight | Li Jingliang | def. | Muslim Salikhov | TKO (punches and elbows) | 2 | 4:38 |
| Flyweight | Matt Schnell | def. | Su Mudaerji | Technical Submission (triangle choke) | 2 | 4:24 |
| Featherweight | Shane Burgos | def. | Charles Jourdain | Decision (majority) (29–28, 29–28, 28–28) | 3 | 5:00 |
| Women's Flyweight | Lauren Murphy | def. | Miesha Tate | Decision (unanimous) (30–27, 30–27, 29–28) | 3 | 5:00 |
Preliminary card (ESPN / ESPN+)
| Middleweight | Punahele Soriano | def. | Dalcha Lungiambula | KO (punches) | 2 | 0:28 |
| Bantamweight | Ricky Simón | def. | Jack Shore | Submission (arm-triangle choke) | 2 | 3:28 |
| Featherweight | Bill Algeo | def. | Herbert Burns | TKO (retirement) | 2 | 1:50 |
| Light Heavyweight | Dustin Jacoby | def. | Da Un Jung | KO (punch) | 1 | 3:13 |
| Middleweight | Dustin Stoltzfus | def. | Dwight Grant | Decision (unanimous) (29–28, 29–28, 29–28) | 3 | 5:00 |
| Women's Strawweight | Emily Ducote | def. | Jessica Penne | Decision (unanimous) (29–28, 29–28, 30–27) | 3 | 5:00 |

== Bonus awards ==
The following fighters received $50,000 bonuses.

- Fight of the Night: Matt Schnell vs. Su Mudaerji
- Performance of the Night: Amanda Lemos, Li Jingliang, Punahele Soriano, Ricky Simón, Bill Algeo, and Dustin Jacoby

== See also ==
- List of UFC events
- List of current UFC fighters
- 2022 in UFC
