= Championship Fighting Alliance =

Mixed martial arts promoter based in Florida

- Acronym: CFA
- Founded: 2011
- Style: Mixed martial arts
- Headquarters: Miami Lakes, Florida
- Founder(s): Jorge De La Noval

Championship Fighting Alliance (CFA) is a mixed martial arts (MMA) based promotion company located in Miami Lakes, Florida. It was founded by former MMA fighter and promoter Jorge De La Noval in 2011.

== Events ==
CFA has currently produced 10 live events. Fallon Fox, who currently is signed to fight for CFA, is the first openly transgender MMA fighter in history.

On May 24, 2013, CFA will be hosting CFA 11, their 11th event at the Bankunited Center located on the University of Miami campus. Fighter 411 reported that CFA had held the most events in Florida during the 2012-2013 season.
