= UFC 328 =

Mixed martial arts event in 2026

UFC 328: Chimaev vs. Strickland
- The poster for UFC 328: Chimaev vs. Strickland
- Promotion: Ultimate Fighting Championship
- Date: May 9, 2026
- Venue: Prudential Center
- City: Newark, New Jersey, United States
- Attendance: 17,783
- Total gate: $7,518,918

Event chronology
UFC Fight Night: Della Maddalena vs. Prates	UFC 328: Chimaev vs. Strickland	UFC Fight Night: Allen vs. Costa

UFC 328: Chimaev vs. Strickland was a mixed martial arts event produced by the Ultimate Fighting Championship that took place on May 9, 2026, at the Prudential Center, in Newark, New Jersey, United States.

== Background ==
The event marked the promotion's 12th visit to Newark and first since UFC 316 in June 2025.

A UFC Middleweight Championship bout between current champion Khamzat Chimaev and former champion Sean Strickland headlined the event.

A UFC Flyweight Championship bout between champion Joshua Van and Tatsuro Taira took place at the co-main event. The pairing was originally scheduled for UFC 327 in April, but one week before that event, Van withdrew due to a knee injury and the bout was shifted to this event. The matchup had previously been linked to UFC 302 in June 2024 before being moved to UFC on ESPN: Perez vs. Taira two weeks later, where Taira faced a different opponent and Van's bout was ultimately cancelled.

A middleweight bout between former LFA Middleweight Champion Osman Diaz and Ateba Gautier took place at this event. They were originally scheduled to face each other in October 2025 at UFC 320 but Diaz withdrew due to a medical issue.

A welterweight bout between Sean Brady and Joaquin Buckley was originally slated to headline UFC Fight Night: Sterling vs. Zalal two weeks prior, but it was moved to this card for undisclosed reasons.

A featherweight bout between Daniel Santos and Choi Doo-ho was expected to take place at the event. However, the matchup was moved to UFC Fight Night: Allen vs. Costa, which is scheduled to occur one week later. The pairing had previously been scheduled for UFC Fight Night: Ulberg vs. Reyes in September 2025, but Choi withdrew for unknown reasons and the bout was cancelled.

Jim Miller and Jared Gordon competed in a lightweight bout at this event. They were once expected to meet at UFC on ESPN: Kara-France vs. Albazi in June 2023, but Gordon was pulled from the bout on the week of the event after not being medically cleared.

A light heavyweight rematch between former KSW and UFC Light Heavyweight Champion Jan Błachowicz and Bogdan Guskov was scheduled to take place at the event. However, Błachowicz withdrew due to a torn meniscus and the pairing was scrapped. The pair previously fought at UFC 323 in December 2025, where their bout ended in a majority draw after being moved from UFC Fight Night: Tsarukyan vs. Hooker for undisclosed reasons.

At the weigh-ins, Jeremy Stephens weighed in at 160 pounds, 4 pounds over the lightweight non-title fight limit. His bout proceeded at catchweight and he was fined 30 percent of his purse, which went to his opponent King Green.

During the event's broadcast, former UFC Middleweight Champion Chris Weidman was announced as the next "modern wing" UFC Hall of Fame inductee during International Fight Week festivities in Las Vegas in July. Also announced, longtime UFC writer Thomas Gerbasi will be inducted into the "contributor wing". His entrance comes posthumously after he died on September 16, 2025, at 57. Gerbasi was a longtime combat sports writer who served as the UFC.com editorial director for over 20 years and also worked for The Ring and BoxingScene.

== Results ==
Fight card (Paramount+)
Weight class				Method	Round	Time	Notes
Middleweight	Sean Strickland	def.	Khamzat Chimaev (c)	Decision (split) (47–48, 48–47, 48–47)	5	5:00	(Note: For the UFC Middleweight Championship.)
Flyweight	Joshua Van (c)	def.	Tatsuro Taira	TKO (front kick to the body and punches)	5	1:32	(Note: For the UFC Flyweight Championship.)
Heavyweight	Alexander Volkov	def.	Waldo Cortes-Acosta	Decision (unanimous) (30–27, 29–28, 29–28)	3	5:00
Welterweight	Sean Brady	def.	Joaquin Buckley	Decision (unanimous) (30–25, 30–25, 30–27)	3	5:00
Catchweight (160 lb)	King Green	def.	Jeremy Stephens	Submission (rear-naked choke)	1	4:20
Preliminary card (Paramount+)
Middleweight	Ateba Gautier	def.	Osman Diaz	TKO (punches)	2	1:10
Welterweight	Yaroslav Amosov	def.	Joel Álvarez	Submission (arm-triangle choke)	2	1:13
Lightweight	Grant Dawson	def.	Mateusz Rębecki	Submission (rear-naked choke)	3	4:42
Lightweight	Jim Miller	def.	Jared Gordon	Submission (guillotine choke)	1	3:29
Early preliminary card (Paramount+ / UFC Fight Pass)
Middleweight	Roman Kopylov	def.	Marco Tulio	Decision (unanimous) (29–28, 29–28, 29–28)	3	5:00
Featherweight	Pat Sabatini	def.	William Gomis	Decision (unanimous) (30–27, 30–27, 29–28)	3	5:00
Middleweight	Baisangur Susurkaev	def.	Djorden Santos	Technical Submission (rear-naked choke)	3	4:12
Flyweight	Jose Ochoa	def.	Clayton Carpenter	Decision (unanimous) (30–27, 30–27, 30–27)	3	5:00

== Bonus awards ==
The following fighters received $100,000 bonuses. The other finishes received $25,000 additional bonuses.

- Fight of the Night: Joshua Van vs. Tatsuro Taira
- Performance of the Night: Yaroslav Amosov and Jim Miller

== See also ==
- 2026 in UFC
- List of current UFC fighters
- List of UFC events
