= UFC Fight Night: Dern vs. Yan =

UFC mixed martial arts event in 2022

- The poster for UFC Fight Night: Dern vs. Yan
- Promotion: Ultimate Fighting Championship
- Date: October 1, 2022
- Venue: UFC Apex
- City: Enterprise, Nevada, United States
- Attendance: Not announced

Event chronology
UFC Fight Night: Sandhagen vs. Song	UFC Fight Night: Dern vs. Yan	UFC Fight Night: Grasso vs. Araújo

UFC Fight Night: Dern vs. Yan (also known as UFC Fight Night 211, UFC on ESPN+ 69 and UFC Vegas 61) was a mixed martial arts event produced by the Ultimate Fighting Championship that took place on October 1, 2022, at the UFC Apex facility in Enterprise, Nevada, part of the Las Vegas Metropolitan Area, United States.

== Background ==
Usually the UFC sells a limited number of VIP tickets for events at the UFC Apex, but it was announced at the beginning of fight week that this event would be closed to the public and media. Media Day and the weigh-ins were available for media, but fight night was off-limits. Though no reason for those measures was revealed, it was rumored that co-founder of Facebook and its parent company Meta Platforms (formerly Facebook, Inc.) Mark Zuckerberg booked the arena for a private event, something that UFC president Dana White vehemently denied. Despite the denial, Zuckerberg and his wife were the only fans spotted at the Apex during the broadcast.

The event was headlined by a women's strawweight bout between Mackenzie Dern and Yan Xiaonan.

A bantamweight bout between former UFC Bantamweight Champion Cody Garbrandt and Rani Yahya was expected to take place at this event. The pairing was previously scheduled for UFC on ESPN: dos Anjos vs. Fiziev, but Yahya withdrew due to a neck injury. In turn, Yahya withdrew again in mid-September for unknown reasons. The bout was scrapped entirely when Garbrandt suffered an injury in mid-September.

A lightweight bout between Vinc Pichel and Jesse Ronson was expected to take place at the event. However, Pichel withdraw due to an undisclosed injury and was replaced by Joaquim Silva.

Cheyanne Vlismas and Tabatha Ricci were scheduled to meet in a women's strawweight bout. Vlismas pulled out in late August for personal reasons and was replaced by former UFC Women's Strawweight Championship challenger and inaugural Invicta FC Atomweight Champion Jessica Penne. However, the day before the event, the bout was scrapped as Penne withdrew due to illness.

A heavyweight bout between Ilir Latifi and Aleksei Oleinik was rescheduled for the event. The pairing has been scheduled and cancelled twice before: first for UFC on ESPN: Blaydes vs. Daukaus and later at UFC 273, but Latifi pulled out each time.

Promotional newcomer Chelsea Chandler and Leah Letson were scheduled to meet in a women's bantamweight bout. However, Letson pulled out in late August for personal reasons and was replaced by Julija Stoliarenko, therefore changing the pairing to a catchweight of 140 pounds.

A lightweight bout between Mike Davis and Uroš Medić was scheduled for the event. However, Medić was removed from the bout for undisclosed reasons and replaced by Viacheslav Borshchev.

A heavyweight bout between Jairzinho Rozenstruik and Chris Daukaus was originally scheduled for the event. However, for unknown reasons, the bout was moved to UFC 282 on December 10.

A light heavyweight bout between Maxim Grishin and Philipe Lins was planned for this event. Despite both men weighing in successfully, the bout was cancelled while the event was in progress due to an undisclosed medical issue.

== Results ==
Main card (ESPN+)
Weight class				Method	Round	Time	Notes
Women's Strawweight	Yan Xiaonan	def.	Mackenzie Dern	Decision (majority) (48–47, 48–47, 47–47)	5	5:00
Welterweight	Randy Brown	def.	Francisco Trinaldo	Decision (unanimous) (29–28, 29–28, 29–28)	3	5:00
Bantamweight	Raoni Barcelos	def.	Trevin Jones	Decision (unanimous) (30–25, 30–27, 30–27)	3	5:00
Featherweight	Sodiq Yusuff	def.	Don Shainis	Submission (guillotine choke)	1	0:30
Lightweight	Mike Davis	def.	Viacheslav Borshchev	Decision (unanimous) (29–28, 30–26, 30–26)	3	5:00
Preliminary card (ESPN+)
Catchweight (140 lb)	Daniel Santos	def.	John Castañeda	KO (punches and knee)	2	4:28
Heavyweight	Ilir Latifi	def.	Aleksei Oleinik	Decision (unanimous) (30–27, 30–27, 30–27)	3	5:00
Lightweight	Joaquim Silva	def.	Jesse Ronson	TKO (knee and punches)	2	3:08
Middleweight	Brendan Allen	def.	Krzysztof Jotko	Submission (rear-naked choke)	1	4:17
Catchweight (140 lb)	Chelsea Chandler	def.	Julija Stoliarenko	TKO (punches)	1	4:15
Bantamweight	Guido Cannetti	def.	Randy Costa	Submission (rear-naked choke)	1	1:04

== Bonus awards ==
The following fighters received $50,000 bonuses.

- Fight of the Night: Daniel Santos vs. John Castañeda
- Performance of the Night: Joaquim Silva, Brendan Allen, Chelsea Chandler, and Guido Cannetti

== See also ==
- List of UFC events
- List of current UFC fighters
- 2022 in UFC
