= Choi Doo-ho =

South Korean mixed martial artist (born 1991)

- Born: April 10, 1991 (age 35); Daegu, South Korea
- Native name: 최두호
- Other names: The Korean Superboy
- Height: 5 ft 9 in (1.75 m)
- Weight: 145 lb (66 kg; 10 st 5 lb)
- Division: Featherweight (2010–present); Lightweight (2009–2010)
- Reach: 70 in (178 cm)
- Fighting out of: Daegu, South Korea
- Team: Jayden’s Dojo
- Rank: Black belt in Brazilian Jiu-Jitsu
- Years active: 2009–present

Kickboxing record
- Total: 2
- Wins: 2
- By knockout: 1
- Losses: 0

Mixed martial arts record
- Total: 23
- Wins: 17
- By knockout: 14
- By submission: 1
- By decision: 2
- Losses: 5
- By knockout: 3
- By decision: 2
- Draws: 1

Other information
- University: Gumi University
- Mixed martial arts record from Sherdog

Choi Doo-ho (Korean: 최두호; born April 10, 1991), often anglicized as Doo Ho Choi or Dooho Choi, also known as The Korean Superboy, is a South Korean professional mixed martial artist who currently competes in the Featherweight division of the Ultimate Fighting Championship (UFC).

== Background ==
Choi graduated from Gumi University with a degree in Security.

== Mixed martial arts career ==
=== DEEP ===
Choi started getting noticed in the MMA world after making his DEEP debut in June 2010, when he faced Yusuke Kagiyama. Choi lost his Deep debut via split decision. After a short stint on the independent circuit, Choi returned to DEEP in September 2010, facing Atsuhiro Tsuboi. He won by TKO in the first round. He went undefeated in his next fights in MMA, beating various fighters like Mitsuhiro Ishida, Kosuke Omeda, and Nobuhiro Obiya.

Before being released to fight in the UFC, Choi fought for DEEP one last time, on June 15, 2013, when he faced Japanese prospect Shoji Maruyama. He won via TKO in the second round.

=== Sengoku Raiden Championship ===
While fighting for DEEP, Choi also signed with Sengoku Raiden Championship. He had his first fight at SRC: Sengoku Raiden Championship 13, when he faced Ikuo Usuda. Choi won via split decision. A few months later, Choi was slated to face Masanori Kanehara at SRC: Sengoku Raiden Championship 15. However, three weeks before the event, Choi suffered an injury and the fight was taken off the card.

=== Ultimate Fighting Championship ===
In November 2013, following a nine-fight winning streak, Choi signed a contract to fight with the UFC to compete in their featherweight division.

Choi was scheduled to face Sam Sicilia on May 24, 2014, at UFC 173. However, Choi pulled out of the bout with an injury.

Choi ultimately made his debut when he faced Juan Puig on November 22, 2014, at UFC Fight Night 57. He won the fight via TKO just 18 seconds into the first round.

A rescheduled bout with Sam Sicilia was expected to take place on July 15, 2015, at UFC Fight Night 71. However, Choi pulled out of the fight in late June for undisclosed reasons.

The bout with Sicilia was scheduled a third time and took place on November 28, 2015, at UFC Fight Night 79. Choi won the fight via knockout in the first round. The win also earned him his first Performance of the Night bonus award.

Choi next faced Thiago Tavares on July 8, 2016, at The Ultimate Fighter 23 Finale. He won the fight via knockout in the first round. The win earned him a Performance of the Night bonus award.

Choi faced Cub Swanson on December 10, 2016, at UFC 206. He lost the fight via unanimous decision. The fight was nominated for Fight of the year by the World MMA Awards and ESPN. Both participants were awarded Fight of the Night. During UFC 273 broadcast in April 2022 it was announced that the fight will be inducted to the UFC Hall of Fame Fight Wing class of 2022.

Choi was briefly linked to a bout with Renan Barão which was expected to take place on April 15, 2017, at UFC on Fox 24. However, as the announcement of the pairing began to circulate, Choi declined the bout, and as a result, Barao is expected to be rescheduled against a different opponent, possibly at another event.

Choi was expected to face Andre Fili on July 29, 2017 at UFC 214. However, Choi pulled out of the fight on June 14 citing an injury and was replaced by promotional newcomer Calvin Kattar.

Choi next faced Jeremy Stephens on January 14, 2018 at UFC Fight Night 124. He lost the fight via TKO in the second round. Both participants were awarded Fight of the Night.

Choi faced Charles Jourdain on December 21, 2019 on UFC Fight Night 165. After knocking Jourdain down in the first round, Choi eventually lost the fight via TKO in the second round. Both participants were awarded Fight of the Night awards.

Choi was scheduled to face Danny Chavez on July 31, 2021 at UFC on ESPN 28. However, Choi had to pull out of the bout due to injury.

Returning after a three-year layoff, Choi faced Kyle Nelson on February 4, 2023, at UFC Fight Night 218. After a point deduction in the third round due to a headbutt, the fight ended in a majority draw. 9 out of 11 media outlets scored the fight as a win for Choi.

Choi faced Bill Algeo on July 20, 2024 at UFC on ESPN 60. He won the fight by technical knockout in the second round.

Choi faced Nate Landwehr on December 7, 2024 at UFC 310. He won the fight by technical knockout via ground punches and elbows in the third round.

Choi was scheduled to face Daniel Santos on September 27, 2025 at UFC Fight Night 260. However, Choi withdrew for unknown reasons and was replaced by Yoo Joo-sang.

Choi was scheduled to face Gavin Tucker on April 18, 2026 at UFC Fight Night 273. However, Tucker had not signed a bout agreement and subsequently announced his retirement from mixed martial arts.

Choi's bout with Daniel Santos was re-scheduled to take place on May 9, 2026 at UFC 328. However, it was later moved to UFC Fight Night 276 one week later on May 16, 2026 for unknown reasons. Choi won the fight by technical knockout in the second round. This fight earned him a $100,000 Fight of the Night award.

Choi faced Patrício Pitbull on September 19, 2026 at UFC 331. He lost the fight by knockout in the first round.

== Personal life ==
Choi married his wife in 2017 and divorced in 2021.

== Championships and accomplishments ==
=== Mixed martial arts ===
- Ultimate Fighting Championship
  - UFC Hall of Fame (Fight Wing, Class of 2022) vs. Cub Swanson at UFC 206
  - Fight of the Night (Four times) vs. Cub Swanson, Jeremy Stephens, Charles Jourdain and Daniel Santos
  - Performance of the Night (Two times) vs. Sam Sicilia and Thiago Tavares
  - Tied (Chad Mendes & Conor McGregor) for third most knockouts in UFC Featherweight division history (6)
  - UFC.com Awards
    - 2016: Fight of the Year vs. Cub Swanson
- World MMA Awards
  - 2016 Fight of the Year vs. Cub Swanson at UFC 206
- Forbes
  - 2016 UFC Fight of the Year vs. Cub Swanson at UFC 206
- Bloody Elbow
  - 2016 Fight of the Year vs. Cub Swanson at UFC 206
- Cage Pages
  - 2016 UFC Fight of the Year vs. Cub Swanson at UFC 206
- ESPN
  - 2016 Fight of the Year vs. Cub Swanson at UFC 206
- MMADNA.nl
  - 2016 Fight of the Year vs. Cub Swanson at UFC 206
- CBS Sports
  - 2016 UFC Fight of the Year vs. Cub Swanson at UFC 206
- Combat Press
  - 2016 Fight of the Year vs. Cub Swanson at UFC 206
- MMA Junkie
  - 2016 #2 Ranked Fight of the Year vs. Cub Swanson at UFC 206

== Filmography ==
=== Television shows ===
| Year | Title | Role | Ref. |
|---|---|---|---|
| 2022–2023 | Fighter | Mentor | |

== Mixed martial arts record ==
Professional record breakdown
| 23 matches | 17 wins | 5 losses |
| By knockout | 14 | 3 |
| By submission | 1 | 0 |
| By decision | 2 | 2 |
| Draws | 1 | |

| Res. | Record | Opponent | Method | Event | Date | Round | Time | Location | Notes |
|---|---|---|---|---|---|---|---|---|---|
| Loss | 17–5–1 | Patrício Pitbull | TKO (punches and elbows) | UFC 331 | September 19, 2026 | 1 | 3:28 | Los Angeles, California, United States | |
| Win | 17–4–1 | Daniel Santos | TKO (punches) | UFC Fight Night: Allen vs. Costa | May 16, 2026 | 2 | 4:29 | Las Vegas, Nevada, United States | Fight of the Night. |
| Win | 16–4–1 | Nate Landwehr | TKO (elbows) | UFC 310 | December 7, 2024 | 3 | 3:21 | Las Vegas, Nevada, United States | |
| Win | 15–4–1 | Bill Algeo | TKO (submission to punch) | UFC on ESPN: Lemos vs. Jandiroba | July 20, 2024 | 2 | 3:38 | Las Vegas, Nevada, United States | |
| Draw | 14–4–1 | Kyle Nelson | Draw (majority) | UFC Fight Night: Lewis vs. Spivac | February 4, 2023 | 3 | 5:00 | Las Vegas, Nevada, United States | Choi was deducted one point in round 3 due to a headbutt. |
| Loss | 14–4 | Charles Jourdain | TKO (punches) | UFC Fight Night: Edgar vs. The Korean Zombie | December 21, 2019 | 2 | 4:32 | Busan, South Korea | Fight of the Night. |
| Loss | 14–3 | Jeremy Stephens | TKO (punches and elbows) | UFC Fight Night: Stephens vs. Choi | January 14, 2018 | 2 | 2:36 | St. Louis, Missouri, United States | Fight of the Night. |
| Loss | 14–2 | Cub Swanson | Decision (unanimous) | UFC 206 | December 10, 2016 | 3 | 5:00 | Toronto, Ontario, Canada | Fight of the Night. |
| Win | 14–1 | Thiago Tavares | KO (punches) | The Ultimate Fighter: Team Joanna vs. Team Cláudia Finale | July 8, 2016 | 1 | 2:42 | Las Vegas, Nevada, United States | Performance of the Night. |
| Win | 13–1 | Sam Sicilia | KO (punches) | UFC Fight Night: Henderson vs. Masvidal | November 28, 2015 | 1 | 1:33 | Seoul, South Korea | Performance of the Night. |
| Win | 12–1 | Juan Puig | TKO (punches) | UFC Fight Night: Edgar vs. Swanson | November 22, 2014 | 1 | 0:18 | Austin, Texas, United States | |
| Win | 11–1 | Shoji Maruyama | TKO (punches) | DEEP: Cage Impact 2013 in Korakuen Hall | June 15, 2013 | 2 | 2:33 | Tokyo, Japan | |
| Win | 10–1 | Tatsunao Nagakura | TKO (corner stoppage) | DEEP: 61 Impact | February 16, 2013 | 2 | 4:14 | Tokyo, Japan | |
| Win | 9–1 | Kosuke Umeda | KO (punch) | DEEP: 59 Impact | August 18, 2012 | 1 | 2:49 | Tokyo, Japan | |
| Win | 8–1 | Mitsuhiro Ishida | KO (knee and punches) | DEEP: 56 Impact | December 17, 2011 | 1 | 1:33 | Tokyo, Japan | |
| Win | 7–1 | Nobuhiro Obiya | KO (flying knee) | DEEP: Cage Impact 2011 in Tokyo | October 29, 2011 | 3 | 0:15 | Tokyo, Japan | |
| Win | 6–1 | Hisaki Hiraishi | Decision (unanimous) | Gladiator 23 | September 3, 2011 | 2 | 5:00 | Hiroshima, Japan | |
| Win | 5–1 | Atsuhiro Tsuboi | TKO (punches) | DEEP: clubDEEP Nagoya | September 5, 2010 | 1 | 4:53 | Nagoya, Japan | |
| Win | 4–1 | Yuichiro Ono | TKO (punches) | Gladiator 7 | June 27, 2010 | 1 | 0:26 | Sapporo, Japan | |
| Win | 3–1 | Ikuo Usuda | Decision (split) | World Victory Road Presents: Sengoku 13 | June 20, 2010 | 3 | 5:00 | Tokyo, Japan | |
| Loss | 2–1 | Yusuke Kagiyama | Decision (split) | DEEP: Cage Impact 2010 in Osaka | June 6, 2010 | 2 | 5:00 | Osaka, Japan | Featherweight debut. |
| Win | 2–0 | Lee Jong-wha | TKO (punches) | M-1 Selection 2010: Asia Round 1 | March 5, 2010 | 1 | 3:20 | Seoul, South Korea | |
| Win | 1–0 | Takashi Matsuoka | Submission (armbar) | Grachan 3 | November 29, 2009 | 1 | 1:05 | Tokyo, Japan | Lightweight debut. |

== Submission grappling record ==
| 1 Matches, 1 Wins, 0 Losses, 1 Draw | | | | | | | | |
| Draw | 3–0–1 | (South Korea) Kim Young Wook | Draw | King of Graplling | August 12, 2013 | (South Korea) Seoul, | South Korea | Submission only - No Gi |
| Win | 3–0 | (South Korea) Unknown | Win | Motor One Jiu Jitsu | 2012 | (South Korea) Seoul, | South Korea | Submission win (armbar) - Gi |
| Win | 2–0 | (South Korea) Jepng-Bum Choi | Win | Motor One Jiu Jitsu | 2012 | (South Korea) Seoul, | South Korea | Decision win - No Gi |
| Win | 1–0 | (South Korea) A-Sol Kwon | Win | Unknown | 2009 | (South Korea) Seoul, | South Korea | Decision win - No Gi |

== See also ==
- List of current UFC fighters
- List of male mixed martial artists
