= UFC Fight Night: Allen vs. Costa =

Mixed martial arts event in 2026

- The poster for UFC Fight Night: Allen vs. Costa
- Promotion: Ultimate Fighting Championship
- Date: May 16, 2026
- Venue: Meta Apex
- City: Enterprise, Nevada, United States
- Attendance: Not announced

Event chronology
UFC 328: Chimaev vs. Strickland	UFC Fight Night: Allen vs. Costa	UFC Fight Night: Song vs. Figueiredo

UFC Fight Night: Allen vs. Costa (also known as UFC Fight Night 276 and UFC Vegas 117) was a mixed martial arts event produced by the Ultimate Fighting Championship that took place on May 16, 2026, at the Meta Apex in Enterprise, Nevada, part of the Las Vegas Valley, United States.

== Background ==
A featherweight bout between Arnold Allen and Melquizael Costa served as the event's headliner.

A featherweight bout between Daniel Santos and Choi Doo-ho was originally expected to take place one week earlier at UFC 328. For undisclosed reasons, the matchup was rescheduled for this event. The pairing had previously been booked for UFC Fight Night: Ulberg vs. Reyes in September 2025, but Choi withdrew for unknown reasons and the bout was cancelled.

A featherweight bout between Jordan Leavitt and Joanderson Brito was scheduled for the event. However, for undisclosed reasons, the bout was moved to UFC Fight Night: Muhammad vs. Bonfim, which is scheduled to take place two weeks later.

Nicolas Dalby and Jeremiah Wells were expected to meet in a welterweight bout at the preliminary card. However on May 7, Dalby pulled out due to an undisclosed injury, so the bout was cancelled.

A lightweight bout between Trey Ogden and promotional newcomer Thomas Gantt was originally scheduled for this event. However, Ogden withdrew due to an injury and was replaced by undefeated promotional newcomer Artur Minev.

Former LFA Light Heavyweight Champion Rodolfo Bellato was expected to face Modestas Bukauskas in a light heavyweight bout at the event. However, Bellato pulled out during fight week for undisclosed reasons and was replaced by promotional newcomer Christian Edwards in a catchweight of 215 pounds.

== Results ==
Main card (Paramount+)
Weight class				Method	Round	Time	Notes
Featherweight	Arnold Allen	def.	Melquizael Costa	Decision (unanimous) (50–45, 50–45, 49–46)	5	5:00
Featherweight	Choi Doo-ho	def.	Daniel Santos	TKO (punches)	2	4:29
Bantamweight	Juan Díaz	def.	Malcolm Wellmaker	Submission (rear-naked choke)	2	4:08
Catchweight (215 lb)	Modestas Bukauskas	def.	Christian Edwards	Decision (split) (28–29, 29–28, 29–28)	3	5:00
Bantamweight	Bernardo Sopaj	def.	Timothy Cuamba	Submission (rear-naked choke)	2	2:25
Welterweight	Khaos Williams	def.	Nikolay Veretennikov	TKO (punches)	1	3:31
Preliminary card (Paramount+)
Light Heavyweight	Ivan Erslan	def.	Tuco Tokkos	Decision (unanimous) (29–28, 29–28, 29–28)	3	5:00
Lightweight	Thomas Gantt	def.	Artur Minev	TKO (punches)	2	2:51
Women's Bantamweight	Ketlen Vieira	def.	Jacqueline Cavalcanti	Decision (unanimous) (29–28, 29–28, 29–28)	3	5:00
Middleweight	Cody Brundage	def.	Andre Petroski	TKO (punches)	2	0:44
Women's Strawweight	Alice Ardelean	def.	Polyana Viana	Submission (capsule lock)	2	4:36
Flyweight	Luis Gurule	def.	Daniel Barez	Decision (unanimous) (30–27, 30–27, 30–27)	3	5:00
Women's Strawweight	Nicolle Caliari	def.	Shauna Bannon	Submission (arm-triangle choke)	3	3:08

== Bonus awards ==
The following fighters received $100,000 bonuses. The other finishes received $25,000 additional bonuses.

- Fight of the Night: Choi Doo-ho vs. Daniel Santos
- Performance of the Night: Juan Díaz and Alice Ardelean

== See also ==
- 2026 in UFC
- List of current UFC fighters
- List of UFC events
