= UFC on Fox: Johnson vs. Reis =

UFC mixed martial arts event in 2017

- The poster for UFC on Fox: Johnson vs. Reis
- Promotion: Ultimate Fighting Championship
- Date: April 15, 2017
- Venue: Sprint Center
- City: Kansas City, Missouri
- Attendance: 12,171
- Total gate: $1,081,193

Event chronology
UFC 210: Cormier vs. Johnson 2	UFC on Fox: Johnson vs. Reis	UFC Fight Night: Swanson vs. Lobov

UFC on Fox: Johnson vs. Reis (also known as UFC on Fox 24) was a mixed martial arts event produced by the Ultimate Fighting Championship held on April 15, 2017, at the Sprint Center in Kansas City, Missouri.

== Background ==
The event was the first that the UFC has hosted in the state of Missouri and the Kansas City metropolitan area.

A UFC Flyweight Championship match between current champion Demetrious Johnson and Wilson Reis headlined this event. The pairing was originally booked for UFC 201, but Johnson pulled out due to an undisclosed injury and the bout was scrapped.

UFC officials were initially targeting a featherweight bout between former UFC Bantamweight Champion Renan Barão and Choi Doo-ho to serve as the event headliner. However, as the announcement of the pairing began to circulate, Choi declined the bout, and as a result, Barao was rescheduled against a different opponent at another event.

== Results ==
Main Card (Fox)
Weight class				Method	Round	Time	Notes
Flyweight	Demetrious Johnson (c)	def.	Wilson Reis	Submission (armbar)	3	4:49	(Note: For the UFC Flyweight Championship.)
Women's Strawweight	Rose Namajunas	def.	Michelle Waterson	Submission (rear-naked choke)	2	2:47
Middleweight	Robert Whittaker	def.	Ronaldo Souza	TKO (head kick and punches)	2	3:28
Featherweight	Renato Moicano	def.	Jeremy Stephens	Decision (split) (29–28, 28–29, 29–28)	3	5:00
Preliminary Card (Fox)
Heavyweight	Alexander Volkov	def.	Roy Nelson	Decision (unanimous) (30–27, 30–27, 30–27)	3	5:00
Bantamweight	Tom Duquesnoy	def.	Patrick Williams	TKO (elbow and punch)	2	0:28
Lightweight	Rashid Magomedov	def.	Bobby Green	Decision (split) (29–28, 28–29, 29–28)	3	5:00
Flyweight	Tim Elliott	def.	Louis Smolka	Decision (unanimous) (30–27, 30–27, 30–27)	3	5:00
Preliminary Card (UFC Fight Pass)
Bantamweight	Aljamain Sterling	def.	Augusto Mendes	Decision (unanimous) (29–28, 29–28, 29–28)	3	5:00
Light Heavyweight	Devin Clark	def.	Jake Collier	Decision (unanimous) (30–27, 30–27, 30–26)	3	5:00
Middleweight	Anthony Smith	def.	Andrew Sanchez	KO (head kick and punches)	3	3:52
Welterweight	Zak Cummings	def.	Nathan Coy	Technical Submission (guillotine choke)	1	4:21
Women's Bantamweight	Ketlen Vieira	def.	Ashlee Evans-Smith	Decision (unanimous) (29–28, 29–28, 30–27)	3	5:00

== Bonus awards ==
The following fighters were awarded $50,000 bonuses:

- Fight of the Night: Tim Elliott vs. Louis Smolka
- Performance of the Night: Demetrious Johnson and Robert Whittaker

== Records set ==
With his win, Johnson tied Anderson Silva's record for most consecutive title defenses (10).

== See also ==
- 2017 in UFC
- List of UFC events
