= UFC 327 =

Mixed martial arts event in 2026

UFC 327: Procházka vs. Ulberg
- The poster for UFC 327: Procházka vs. Ulberg
- Promotion: Ultimate Fighting Championship
- Date: April 11, 2026
- Venue: Kaseya Center
- City: Miami, Florida, United States
- Attendance: 17,741
- Total gate: $6,518,684

Event chronology
UFC Fight Night: Moicano vs. Duncan	UFC 327: Procházka vs. Ulberg	UFC Fight Night: Burns vs. Malott

UFC 327: Procházka vs. Ulberg was a mixed martial arts event produced by the Ultimate Fighting Championship that took place on April 11, 2026 at the Kaseya Center in Miami, Florida, United States.

== Background ==
The event marked the promotion's fifth visit to Miami and first since UFC 314 in April 2025.

A UFC Light Heavyweight Championship bout for the vacant title between former champion Jiří Procházka (also the inaugural Rizin Light Heavyweight Champion) and Carlos Ulberg headlined the event, as current two-time champion Alex Pereira (also former UFC Middleweight Champion, former Glory Middleweight and Light Heavyweight Champion) vacated the title in order to challenge for the interim UFC Heavyweight Championship.

A UFC Flyweight Championship bout between current champion Joshua Van and Tatsuro Taira was scheduled to take place at the event. However, one week before the event, Van withdrew due to a knee injury, so the bout was moved to UFC 328, which is scheduled to take place one month later. The pairing was briefly linked to UFC 302 in June 2024 before being shifted to UFC on ESPN: Perez vs. Taira two weeks later, where Taira faced a different opponent and Van's bout was ultimately cancelled.

A flyweight bout between Road to UFC Season 3 flyweight winner Choi Dong-hun and undefeated prospect André Lima was scheduled for this event. However, for undisclosed reasons, the bout was moved to UFC Fight Night: Burns vs. Malott, which is scheduled to take place one week later.

A middleweight bout between Kyle Daukaus and Vicente Luque was scheduled at this event. However, Daukaus withdrew after being re‑scheduled for the UFC Freedom 250 event in June and was replaced by former interim UFC Middleweight Championship challenger (also The Ultimate Fighter: Team Jones vs. Team Sonnen middleweight winner) Kelvin Gastelum.

A lightweight bout between Nazim Sadykhov and MarQuel Mederos was scheduled for the event. The two were originally expected to meet at UFC on ESPN: Namajunas vs. Cortez in July 2024 after Mederos stepped in as a replacement fighter, but he withdrew and the bout was scrapped. In turn, Sadykhov pulled out in late March due to injury and was replaced by Chris Padilla. At the weigh-ins, Padilla weighed in at 158 pounds, two pounds over the lightweight non-title fight limit. The bout proceeded at catchweight and he was fined 20 percent of his purse, which went to Mederos.

Beneil Dariush and Manuel Torres were expected to meet in a lightweight bout. However, Torres pulled out due to injury, leaving Dariush without an opponent. As a result, Dariush was removed from the card and was re‑scheduled to compete at UFC Fight Night: Della Maddalena vs. Prates one month later against Quillan Salkilld.

A welterweight bout between Francisco Prado and promotional newcomer Christopher Alvidrez was originally scheduled for this event. However, Alvidrez withdrew for unknown reasons and was replaced by Charles Radtke.

== Results ==
Fight card (Paramount+ / CBS)
Weight class				Method	Round	Time	Notes
Light Heavyweight	Carlos Ulberg	def.	Jiří Procházka	KO (punches)	1	3:45	(Note: For the vacant UFC Light Heavyweight Championship.)
Light Heavyweight	Paulo Costa	def.	Azamat Murzakanov	TKO (head kick)	3	1:23
Heavyweight	Josh Hokit	def.	Curtis Blaydes	Decision (unanimous) (29–28, 29–28, 29–28)	3	5:00
Light Heavyweight	Dominick Reyes	def.	Johnny Walker	Decision (split) (29–28, 28–29, 29–28)	3	5:00
Featherweight	Cub Swanson	def.	Nate Landwehr	TKO (punches)	1	4:06
Preliminary card (Paramount+ / CBS)
Featherweight	Aaron Pico	def.	Patrício Pitbull	Decision (unanimous) (30–27, 30–27, 29–28)	3	5:00
Welterweight	Kevin Holland	def.	Randy Brown	Decision (unanimous) (30–27, 30–27, 30–27)	3	5:00
Lightweight	Mateusz Gamrot	def.	Esteban Ribovics	Submission (arm-triangle choke)	2	4:19
Women's Strawweight	Tatiana Suarez	def.	Loopy Godínez	Submission (rear-naked choke)	2	2:29
Early preliminary card (Paramount+ / UFC Fight Pass)
Catchweight (158 lb)	Chris Padilla	vs.	MarQuel Mederos	Draw (majority) (28–28, 28–28, 29–27)	3	5:00	(Note: Mederos was deducted one point in round 3 due to repeated eye pokes.)
Middleweight	Vicente Luque	def.	Kelvin Gastelum	Submission (anaconda choke)	1	4:08
Welterweight	Charles Radtke	def.	Francisco Prado	Decision (unanimous) (30–26, 30–26, 30–26)	3	5:00	(Note: Prado was deducted one point in round 3 due to repeated eye pokes.)

== Bonus awards ==
The following fighters received $100,000 bonuses. The other finishes received $25,000 additional bonuses.

- Fight of the Night: Josh Hokit vs. Curtis Blaydes
- Performance of the Night: Carlos Ulberg and Josh Hokit

== See also ==
- 2026 in UFC
- List of current UFC fighters
- List of UFC events
