= Daniel Santos (fighter) =

Brazilian mixed martial artist (born 1995)

- Born: Daniel Gustavo Gonzaga Santos; March 12, 1995 (age 31); Uberlândia, Minas Gerais, Brazil
- Other names: Willycat
- Nationality: Brazilian
- Height: 5 ft 7 in (1.70 m)
- Weight: 145 lb (66 kg)
- Division: Bantamweight; Featherweight
- Reach: 67 in (170 cm)
- Stance: Orthodox
- Fighting out of: São Paulo, Brazil
- Team: Chute Boxe Diego Lima
- Years active: 2013–present

Mixed martial arts record
- Total: 18
- Wins: 15
- By knockout: 7
- By submission: 2
- By decision: 6
- Losses: 3
- By knockout: 1
- By decision: 2

Other information
- Mixed martial arts record from Sherdog

Daniel Gustavo Gonzaga Santos (born March 12, 1995) is a Brazilian professional mixed martial artist currently competing in the Featherweight division of the Ultimate Fighting Championship (UFC).

== Early life and background ==
Santos was born in Uberlândia, Minas Gerais, Brazil. He later relocated to São Paulo, where he trained under the Chute Boxe Diego Lima team. Before turning professional, he lived in rural Brazil and worked in agriculture. He holds a black grade in Muay Thai from Kickboxing Academy and a purple belt in Brazilian jiu‑jitsu, and he competed in ten amateur Muay Thai bouts, winning all of them. Santos has cited Charles Oliveira, Thomas Almeida, and Fedor Emelianenko as key influences on his career.

Santos began training in mixed martial arts in 2011 after being inspired by a televised Anderson Silva fight. Early in his training, he earned the nickname Willycat after performing an unusually high sprawl that made it difficult for partners to take him down; his coach compared the movement to a cat, referencing the ThunderCats character.

== Professional mixed martial arts career ==
=== Early career ===
Santos began his professional career competing in regional Brazilian promotions, where he captured a Fatality Arena title in Rio de Janeiro and built the record that eventually led to his signing with the UFC.

=== Ultimate Fighting Championship ===
Santos made his debut with the UFC on April 9, 2022 against Julio Arce at UFC 273. At the weigh-ins, Arce weighed in at 136.5 pounds, half a pound over the bantamweight non-title fight limit. The bout proceeded at a catchweight and he forfeited 20% of his purse which went to Santos. Santos lost the bout via unanimous decision.

Santos faced John Castañeda on October 1, 2022 at UFC Fight Night 211. He won the fight by knockout in the second round with a knee. This bout earned them a Fight of the Night award.

Santos and Johnny Muñoz Jr. were expected to meet on May 6, 2023 at UFC 288, but the bout was scrapped after Santos withdrew due to an undisclosed injury. They eventually faced each other on June 3, 2023 at UFC on ESPN 46, where Santos won by unanimous decision.

Returning to the featherweight division, Santos faced Lee Jeong-yeong on May 10, 2025 at UFC 315 and won the bout via unanimous decision.

Santos was scheduled to face Choi Doo-ho on September 28, 2025 at UFC Fight Night 260. However, due to injury, Choi was replaced by Yoo Joo-sang. In addition, for unknown reasons, the bout was moved to UFC 320, which took place on October 4, 2025. Their bout was changed to a catchweight bout of 153 pounds due to both fighters weighing in over the featherweight bout limit. Santos won the fight by technical knockout in the second round.

Santos' bout with Choi was re-scheduled to take place on May 9, 2026 at UFC 328. However, it was later moved to UFC Fight Night 276 one week later on May 16, 2026 for unknown reasons. Santos lost the fight by technical knockout in the second round. This fight earned him a $100,000 Fight of the Night award.

Santos faced Bolaji Oki on October 24, 2026 at UFC 333. He won the fight by unanimous decision.

== Championships and accomplishments ==
=== Mixed martial arts ===
- Ultimate Fighting Championship
  - Fight of the Night (Two times) vs. John Castañeda and Choi Doo-ho

== Mixed martial arts record ==
Professional record breakdown
18 matches	15 wins	3 losses
By knockout	7	1
By submission	2	0
By decision	6	2

Res.	Record	Opponent	Method	Event	Date	Round	Time	Location	Notes
Win	15–3	Bolaji Oki	Decision (unanimous)	UFC 333	October 24, 2026	3	5:00	Abu Dhabi, United Arab Emirates	
Loss	14–3	Choi Doo-ho	TKO (punches)	UFC Fight Night: Allen vs. Costa	May 16, 2026	2	4:29	Las Vegas, Nevada, United States	Fight of the Night.
Win	14–2	Yoo Joo-sang	TKO (punches)	UFC 320	October 4, 2025	2	0:21	Las Vegas, Nevada, United States	Catchweight (153 lb) bout.
Win	13–2	Lee Jeong-yeong	Decision (unanimous)	UFC 315	May 10, 2025	3	5:00	Las Vegas, Nevada, United States	Return to Featherweight.
Win	12–2	Johnny Muñoz Jr.	Decision (unanimous)	UFC on ESPN: Kara-France vs. Albazi	June 3, 2023	3	5:00	Las Vegas, Nevada, United States	Santos was deducted one point in round 3 due to a groin strike.
Win	11–2	John Castañeda	KO (punches and knee)	UFC Fight Night: Dern vs. Yan	October 1, 2022	2	4:28	Las Vegas, Nevada, United States	Catchweight (140 lb) bout. Fight of the Night.
Loss	10–2	Julio Arce	Decision (unanimous)	UFC 273	April 9, 2022	3	5:00	Jacksonville, Florida, United States	Catchweight (136.5 lb) bout; Arce missed weight.
Win	10–1	Nizambek Abdrashitov	Submission (armbar)	Brave CF 32	December 14, 2019	1	2:37	Bishkek, Kyrgyzstan	
Win	9–1	Henrique Fantini	TKO (spinning back kick)	Future FC 6	June 28, 2019	1	2:21	São Paulo, Brazil	
Loss	8–1	Murad Kalamov	Decision (unanimous)	ACA 91	January 26, 2019	3	5:00	Grozny, Russia	
Win	8–0	Dukvaha Astamirov	Decision (majority)	ACB 80	February 16, 2018	3	5:00	Krasnodar, Russia	Fight of the Night.
Win	7–0	Cleverson Silva	TKO (spinning back kick to the body)	Fighten Decagon MMA 3	September 11, 2016	1	3:10	Londrina, Brazil	Return to Bantamweight.
Win	6–0	Jose Alexandre	TKO (punches and knees)	Thunder Fight 6	April 2, 2016	3	3:30	São Paulo, Brazil	Flyweight debut.
Win	5–0	Lucas Eurico	TKO (punches)	Copa Euro 1	October 6, 2015	2	0:20	Uberlândia, Brazil	Bantamweight bout.
Win	4–0	Irwing Romero Machado	Decision (unanimous)	Fighten Decagon MMA 2	August 22, 2015	3	5:00	Londrina, Brazil	Featherweight debut.
Win	3–0	Ary dos Santos	Technical Submission (anaconda choke)	Arena Fight Uberlândia 8	March 30, 2015	3	2:42	Uberlândia, Brazil	
Win	2–0	Jose Mauro dos Santos	KO (spinning back elbow)	Fatality Arena 6	March 30, 2014	2	N/A	Niterói, Brazil	
Win	1–0	Caio Forastieri	Decision (unanimous)	Warriors of God 1	August 17, 2013	3	5:00	Uberlândia, Brazil	Bantamweight debut.

== See also ==
- List of current UFC fighters
- List of male mixed martial artists
