= Gumi University =

South Korean university

Coordinates: 36.15063°N 128.28928°E

- Hangul: 구미대학교
- Hanja: 龜尾大學校
- RR: Gumi daehakgyo
- MR: Kumi taehakkyo

Gumi University is a university located in Gumi, North Gyeongsang, South Korea.

== Notable alumni ==
- Choi Doo-ho - professional Mixed Martial Artist
