= John Castañeda =

American mixed martial artist (born 1991)

- Born: John Castañeda; December 18, 1991 (age 34); Dallas, Texas, U.S.
- Other names: Sexi Mexi
- Height: 5 ft 6 in (1.68 m)
- Weight: 135 lb (61 kg; 9 st 9 lb)
- Division: Lightweight; Featherweight; Bantamweight
- Reach: 71 in (180 cm)
- Fighting out of: Minneapolis, Minnesota, U.S.
- Team: Mankato Martial Arts (2010–2014); Minnesota Martial Arts Academy (2015–present); Bangtao Muay Thai & MMA (2023–present)
- Rank: Black belt in Brazilian Jiu-Jitsu under Greg Nelson
- Years active: 2012–present

Mixed martial arts record
- Total: 31
- Wins: 21
- By knockout: 8
- By submission: 6
- By decision: 7
- Losses: 9
- By knockout: 2
- By decision: 7
- Draws: 1

Other information
- University: Minnesota State University, Mankato
- Mixed martial arts record from Sherdog

John Castañeda (born December 18, 1991) is an American mixed martial artist who currently competes in the Bantamweight division of the Ultimate Fighting Championship (UFC). A professional since 2012, he formerly competed for Combate Global.

== Background ==
Castañeda was born in Dallas, Texas. At four, he relocated to Minnesota, where he currently resides. During his freshman year of college, he wrestled for the Minnesota State Mavericks. In 2013, Castañeda graduated from Minnesota State University, Mankato. He double-majored in criminal justice and Spanish with a minor in social work.

== Professional mixed martial arts career ==
=== Early career ===
Castañeda went 15–1 in amateur competition, and racked a professional record of 7–2 in the regional circuit of Minnesota before signing with Combate Americas. In Combate Americas, Castañeda amassed four straight victories which led to a shot at the inaugural Combate Americas Bantamweight Championship. Castañeda faced Gustavo Lopez at Combate Americas - Empire Rising on October 14, 2016, with the bout being originally being for the championship, however Castañeda missed weight, coming in at 137.5 lbs. He won the bout via fourth-round knockout.

Castañeda was cut from Combate Americas after he refused the rematch against Gustavo Lopez, however he later returned to the promotion, defeating Chris Beal via TKO in the second round at Combate Americas 14.

=== Dana White's Contender Series ===
Having racked up a record of 13–2, Castañeda was invited to compete at Dana White's Contender Series 5, facing Cheyden Leialoha. He won the bout via unanimous decision, but was not awarded with a contract to the UFC.

=== Return to Combate ===
On October 26, 2017, it was announced that Castañeda would participate in Combate Americas' Copa Combate 2017 one-night tournament that took place on November 11, 2017. In the quarterfinals Castañeda faced Kevin Moreyra, winning by first-round submission. Advancing to the semifinals, he defeated Marc Gomez by unanimous decision. In the tournament final Castañeda faced Levy Marroquín, losing the bout via unanimous decision.

Castañeda was expected to headline Combate Americas Mexico vs. USA against Erik Pérez on October 13, 2018, but the bout was postponed to a later date because Castañeda caught staph infection.

After the tournament, Castañeda went on to lose one and win one bout in Combate Americas before being signed to the UFC on short notice.

=== Ultimate Fighting Championship ===
Replacing the mourning Umar Nurmagomedov on short notice on July 26, 2020, Castañeda made his UFC debut against Nathaniel Wood at UFC on ESPN 14. He lost the fight via unanimous decision.

Castañeda faced Eddie Wineland on February 20, 2021 at UFC Fight Night 185. He won the fight via first round technical knockout.

Castañeda faced Miles Johns on February 5, 2022 at UFC Fight Night 200. He won the fight via third round technical submission.

As the last bout of his initial UFC contract, Castañeda faced Daniel Santos on October 1, 2022 at UFC Fight Night 211. He lost the bout in the second round, getting knocked out with a knee. This bout earned them a Fight of the Night award.

As the first fight of his new four-fight contract, Castañeda was scheduled to face Mateus Mendonça on June 3, 2023, at UFC on ESPN 46. However, Mendonça withdrew from the bout and was replaced by Muin Gafurov. Castañeda won the fight by unanimous decision.

Castañeda faced Kang Kyung-ho on November 18, 2023 at UFC 295. He won the bout via unanimous decision.

Castañeda faced Daniel Marcos on June 8, 2024, at UFC on ESPN 57. He lost the fight by unanimous decision.

Castañeda was scheduled to face Douglas Silva de Andrade on March 1, 2025 at UFC Fight Night 253. However, despite having the bout changed to a 140 pound catchweight bout, the fight was cancelled as Silva de Andrade did not have medical clearance to compete.

Replacing Jean Matsumoto, who was withdrawn from UFC 313 in order to serve as a replacement fighter two weeks prior, Castañeda was scheduled to face Chris Gutiérrez on March 8, 2025 at UFC 313 in a featherweight bout. However, a few hours before the event took place, Castañeda withdrew due to an undisclosed illness and the bout was scrapped. His bout with Gutiérrez was rescheduled to April 26, 2025 at UFC on ESPN 66. Castañeda lost the fight by split decision.

Castañeda faced promotional newcomer Mark Vologdin on April 18, 2026, at UFC Fight Night 273. Despite being slated as a bantamweight bout, it was changed to a 139-pounds catchweight bout. After Castañeda was deducted one point in the second round due to repeated groin strikes, the fight was deemed a majority draw with the judges' scorecards reading 29–27, 28–28, 28–28. 7 out of 11 media outlets scored the bout for Castañeda while the remaining four outlets scored it as a draw.

Castañeda faced Alateng Heili on September 26, 2026 at UFC Fight Night 289. He lost the fight by split decision.

== Championships and accomplishments ==
=== Mixed martial arts ===
- Ultimate Fighting Championship
  - Fight of the Night (One time) vs. Daniel Santos

== Mixed martial arts record ==
Professional record breakdown
31 matches	21 wins	9 losses
By knockout	8	2
By submission	6	0
By decision	7	7
Draws	1	

Res.	Record	Opponent	Method	Event	Date	Round	Time	Location	Notes
Loss	21–9–1	Alateng Heili	Decision (split)	UFC Fight Night: Rosas Jr. vs. Barcelos	September 26, 2026	3	5:00	Las Vegas, Nevada, United States	
Draw	21–8–1	Mark Vologdin	Draw (majority)	UFC Fight Night: Burns vs. Malott	April 18, 2026	3	5:00	Winnipeg, Manitoba, Canada	Catchweight (139 lb) bout. Castañeda was deducted one point in round 2 due to repeated groin strikes.
Loss	21–8	Chris Gutiérrez	Decision (split)	UFC on ESPN: Machado Garry vs. Prates	April 26, 2025	3	5:00	Kansas City, Missouri, United States	Featherweight bout.
Loss	21–7	Daniel Marcos	Decision (unanimous)	UFC on ESPN: Cannonier vs. Imavov	June 8, 2024	3	5:00	Louisville, Kentucky, United States	
Win	21–6	Kang Kyung-ho	Decision (unanimous)	UFC 295	November 11, 2023	3	5:00	New York City, New York, United States	Catchweight (138 lb) bout.
Win	20–6	Muin Gafurov	Decision (unanimous)	UFC on ESPN: Kara-France vs. Albazi	June 3, 2023	3	5:00	Las Vegas, Nevada, United States	Gafurov was deducted 1 point in round 2 due to repeatedly leading with the head.
Loss	19–6	Daniel Santos	KO (punches and knee)	UFC Fight Night: Dern vs. Yan	October 1, 2022	2	4:28	Las Vegas, Nevada, United States	Catchweight (140 lb) bout. Fight of the Night.
Win	19–5	Miles Johns	Technical Submission (arm-triangle choke)	UFC Fight Night: Hermansson vs. Strickland	February 5, 2022	3	1:38	Las Vegas, Nevada, United States	Johns tested positive for adderall.
Win	18–5	Eddie Wineland	TKO (punches)	UFC Fight Night: Blaydes vs. Lewis	February 20, 2021	1	4:44	Las Vegas, Nevada, United States	
Loss	17–5	Nathaniel Wood	Decision (unanimous)	UFC on ESPN: Whittaker vs. Till	July 26, 2020	3	5:00	Abu Dhabi, United Arab Emirates	
Win	17–4	Marcelo Rojo	Submission (arm-triangle choke)	Combate Americas 35	April 12, 2019	3	2:37	Monterrey, Mexico	Catchweight (138.5 lb) bout; Castañeda missed weight.
Loss	16–4	José Alday	Decision (split)	Combate Americas 20	April 13, 2018	3	5:00	Los Angeles, California, United States	
Loss	16–3	Levy Saúl Marroquín	Decision (unanimous)	Combate Americas 18	November 11, 2017	3	3:00	Cancún, Mexico	Copa Combate Bantamweight Tournament Final.
Win	16–2	Marc Gomez	Decision (unanimous)	Combate Americas 18	November 11, 2017	3	3:00	Cancún, Mexico	Copa Combate Bantamweight Tournament Semifinal.
Win	15–2	Kevin Moreyra	Submission (rear-naked choke)	Combate Americas 18	November 11, 2017	1	4:52	Cancún, Mexico	Copa Combate Bantamweight Tournament Quarterfinal.
Win	14–2	Cheyden Leialoha	Decision (unanimous)	Dana White's Contender Series 4	August 1, 2017	3	5:00	Las Vegas, Nevada, United States	
Win	13–2	Chris Beal	TKO (punches)	Combate Americas 14	May 5, 2017	2	0:42	Ventura, California, United States	
Win	12–2	Gustavo Lopez	TKO (punches)	Combate Americas 9	October 14, 2016	4	2:24	Verona, New York, United States	Return to Bantamweight. For the vacant Combate Bantamweight Championship. Castañeda missed weight (137.5 lb) and was ineligible to win the title.
Win	11–2	Angel Cruz	TKO (punches)	Combate Americas 8	August 11, 2016	2	2:25	Los Angeles, California, United States	
Win	10–2	Gabriel Solorio	Decision (split)	Combate Americas 6	April 25, 2016	3	5:00	Los Angeles, California, United States	Featherweight debut.
Win	9–2	Federico Lopez	Submission (arm-triangle choke)	Combate Americas: Road to the Championship 2	December 16, 2015	3	4:49	Los Angeles, California, United States	Catchweight (140 lb) bout.
Win	8–2	Justin Governale	Decision (unanimous)	Combate Americas: Road to the Championship 1	September 17, 2015	3	5:00	Las Vegas, Nevada, United States	Catchweight (140 lb) bout.
Win	7–2	Joe Pearson	TKO (punches)	KOTC: Power Surge	August 22, 2015	1	2:47	Carlton, Minnesota, United States	
Win	6–2	Pedro Velasco	Submission (rear-naked choke)	KOTC: Total Dominance	May 16, 2015	1	2:42	Carlton, Minnesota, United States	
Loss	5–2	Matt Brown	Decision (split)	RFA 19	October 10, 2014	3	5:00	Prior Lake, Minnesota, United States	
Win	5–1	Ruddy Gray	TKO (punches)	Driller Promotions: Live MMA at 7 Clans Casino	July 26, 2014	2	3:17	River Falls, Minnesota, United States	Catchweight (140 lb) bout.
Loss	4–1	Matt Brown	TKO (punches)	Driller Promotions: Mecca 5	May 31, 2014	1	2:22	Prior Lake, Minnesota, United States	For the Driller Promotions Bantamweight Championship.
Win	4–0	Derrick Mandell	Decision (unanimous)	Driller Promotions: Caged Chaos at Canterbury Park 5	February 22, 2014	3	5:00	Shakopee, Minnesota, United States	Bantamweight debut.
Win	3–0	Adam Schumacher	TKO (submission to punches)	Driller Promotions: Mecca 2	November 2, 2013	1	3:32	Prior Lake, Minnesota, United States	
Win	2–0	Bruce Johnson	Submission (rear-naked choke)	Driller Promotions: Downtown Showdown 12	January 26, 2013	1	2:32	Minneapolis, Minnesota, United States	Catchweight (165 lb) bout.
Win	1–0	Brandon Abrego	KO (punch)	Driller Promotions: Caged Chaos at Canterbury Park 1	September 22, 2012	1	0:36	Shakopee, Minnesota, United States	Lightweight debut.

== See also ==
- List of current UFC fighters
- List of male mixed martial artists
