= Charles Jourdain =

Canadian mixed martial arts fighter

- Born: November 27, 1995 (age 30); Beloeil, Quebec, Canada
- Other names: Air
- Height: 5 ft 9 in (1.75 m)
- Weight: 145 lb (66 kg; 10 st 5 lb)
- Division: Bantamweight (2024–present); Featherweight (2013–2024); Lightweight (2017, 2019)
- Reach: 69 in (175 cm)
- Fighting out of: Beloeil, Quebec, Canada
- Team: Brazilian Top Team Canada
- Rank: Black belt in Brazilian Jiu-Jitsu under Fábio Holanda
- Years active: 2013–present

Mixed martial arts record
- Total: 28
- Wins: 18
- By knockout: 8
- By submission: 7
- By decision: 3
- Losses: 9
- By knockout: 2
- By submission: 1
- By decision: 6
- Draws: 1

Amateur record
- Total: 10
- Wins: 8
- By submission: 5
- Losses: 2
- By submission: 1

Other information
- Mixed martial arts record from Sherdog

Charles Jourdain (born November 27, 1995) is a Canadian mixed martial artist who currently competes in the Bantamweight division of the Ultimate Fighting Championship (UFC). He was previously a TKO Major League MMA Double Champion, winning the Featherweight and Interim Lightweight Championship.

== Mixed martial arts career ==
=== Early career ===
Jourdain began competing in mixed martial arts in 2013. He earned an amateur record of 8–2, fighting 8 times in 2013 winning 7 of those bouts. He also competed in FightQuest Amateur Combat in 2014 where he won the vacant FightQuest Featherweight Championship and earned a "Performance of the Night" bonus. After going professional in 2015 he competed exclusively in Canadian MMA promotions. Jourdain made his MMA debut against Thomas Sumantri on May 21, 2016, at LAMMQ - Quebec Mixed Martial Arts League 5. He won the fight via knockout with a flying knee in the first round, earning a Knockout of the Night bonus. He was the TKO Featherweight and Interim Lightweight champion, and amassed a record 9–1 prior to signing with Ultimate Fighting Championship in 2019.

=== Ultimate Fighting Championship ===
Making his promotional debut on short notice, Jourdain faced Des Green on May 18, 2019, at UFC Fight Night 152. He lost the fight via unanimous decision.

Jourdain would next face Doo Ho Choi at UFC Fight Night 165 on December 21, 2019. Choi would drop Jourdain early with the rest of the round consisting of exchanges that would lead to Choi breaking his left arm on a spinning backfist attempt, Jourdain would later drop Choi with 0:21 seconds left in round 1. Round 2 would see more exchanges between the two fighters With 30 seconds left in the round, Jourdain dropped Choi with a left cross and then a right hook. He won the fight via TKO at 4:32 seconds of round 2. The fight earned him a Fight of the Night bonus.

Returning to action amidst the COVID-19 pandemic, Jourdain faced Andre Fili at UFC on ESPN 10 on June 13, 2020. The first round saw the two exchanging on the feet with Jourdain knocking Fili down with an overhand left. Fili secured a take down near the end of the round two. Jourdain lost the fight via split decision.

Jourdain next faced Joshua Culibao on October 4, 2020 at UFC on ESPN 16. The bout would see both fighters push the pace and employ their game plans. The fight would go the distance ending with a split draw result.

Jourdain was scheduled to face Steve Garcia on March 13, 2021, at UFC Fight Night 187. On February 24, Garcia pulled out of the fight due to injury and was replaced by UFC newcomer Marcelo Rojo. He won the fight by technical knockout in the third round.

Jourdain was scheduled to face Lerone Murphy on September 4, 2021, at UFC Fight Night 191. However, Murphy was pulled from the event due to visa issues, and he was replaced by Julian Erosa. Jourdain lost the fight via a submission in round three.

As the last bout of his prevailing contract, Jourdain faced Andre Ewell on December 18, 2021, at UFC Fight Night 199. He won the bout via unanimous decision.

As the first bout of his new four-fight contract Jourdain was scheduled to face Ilia Topuria, replacing Movsar Evloev, on January 22, 2022, at UFC 270. However, Topuria was pulled from the card due to a medical issue related to cutting weight and the bout was cancelled.

Jourdain faced Lando Vannata on April 23, 2022, at UFC Fight Night 205. He won the fight via a guillotine choke in round one.

Jourdain faced Shane Burgos on July 16, 2022, at UFC on ABC 3. He lost the back-and-forth fight via majority decision.

Jourdain faced Nathaniel Wood on September 3, 2022, at UFC Fight Night 209. He lost the fight via unanimous decision.

Jourdain faced Kron Gracie at UFC 288 on May 6, 2023. He won the fight via unanimous decision after outstriking Gracie through majority of the bout.

Jourdain faced Ricardo Ramos on September 23, 2023 at UFC Fight Night 228. He won the fight via guillotine choke in round one. This win earned him the Performance of the Night award.

Jourdain faced Sean Woodson on January 20, 2024, at UFC 297. He lost the competitive bout by split decision.

Jourdain faced Jean Silva on June 29, 2024 at UFC 303. At the weigh-ins, Silva weighed in at 147.5 pounds, one and a half pounds over the featherweight non-title fight limit. The bout proceeded at catchweight and Silva was fined 20 percent of his purse which went to Jourdain. Jourdain lost the fight by knockout in the second round.

Jourdain faced Victor Henry in a bantamweight bout on November 2, 2024 at UFC Fight Night 246. He won the fight via a guillotine choke submission in the second round, leading to Henry's first career loss by finish. This fight earned him another Performance of the Night award.

Jourdain was scheduled to face Ricky Simón on June 14, 2025, at UFC on ESPN 69. However, Jourdain withdrew one week before the event due to an eye injury.

Jourdain faced Davey Grant on October 18, 2025, at UFC Fight Night 262. He won the fight via a guillotine choke in round one. This fight earned him another Performance of the Night award.

Jourdain faced Kyler Phillips on April 18, 2026 at UFC Fight Night 273. He won the fight by unanimous decision. This fight earned him a $100,000 Fight of the Night award.

Jourdain was scheduled to face Marlon Vera on July 18, 2026 at UFC Fight Night 281. However, for unknown reasons, the bout was moved to UFC 331 on September 19, 2026. Jourdain lost the fight by technical knockout in the third round.

== Championships and accomplishments ==
- Ultimate Fighting Championship
  - Fight of the Night (Two times) vs. Doo Ho Choi and Kyler Phillips
  - Performance of the Night (Three times) vs. Ricardo Ramos, Victor Henry and Davey Grant
- TKO Major League MMA
  - TKO Featherweight Championship (One time)
  - Interim TKO Lightweight Championship (One time)
- Ligue d'Arts Martiaux Mixtes du Québec
  - LAMMQ 5 Knockout of the Night
- FightQuest Amateur Combat
  - FightQuest Featherweight Championship
  - FightQuest Performance of the Night

== Personal life ==
He has two older brothers and a younger brother. Jourdain younger brother, Louis Jourdain, who was awarded a UFC contract on the week 8 episode of the 9th season of Dana White's Contender Series, after securing a third-round submission victory.

== Mixed martial arts record ==
Professional record breakdown
28 matches	18 wins	9 losses
By knockout	8	2
By submission	7	1
By decision	3	6
Draws	1	

Res.	Record	Opponent	Method	Event	Date	Round	Time	Location	Notes
Loss	18–9–1	Marlon Vera	TKO (submission to punch)	UFC 331	September 19, 2026	3	2:02	Los Angeles, California, United States	
Win	18–8–1	Kyler Phillips	Decision (unanimous)	UFC Fight Night: Burns vs. Malott	April 18, 2026	3	5:00	Winnipeg, Manitoba, Canada	Fight of the Night.
Win	17–8–1	Davey Grant	Submission (guillotine choke)	UFC Fight Night: de Ridder vs. Allen	October 18, 2025	1	3:05	Vancouver, British Columbia, Canada	Performance of the Night.
Win	16–8–1	Victor Henry	Submission (guillotine choke)	UFC Fight Night: Moreno vs. Albazi	November 2, 2024	2	3:43	Edmonton, Alberta, Canada	Bantamweight debut. Performance of the Night.
Loss	15–8–1	Jean Silva	KO (punch)	UFC 303	June 29, 2024	2	1:22	Las Vegas, Nevada, United States	Catchweight (147.5 lb) bout; Silva missed weight.
Loss	15–7–1	Sean Woodson	Decision (split)	UFC 297	January 20, 2024	3	5:00	Toronto, Ontario, Canada	
Win	15–6–1	Ricardo Ramos	Submission (guillotine choke)	UFC Fight Night: Fiziev vs. Gamrot	September 23, 2023	1	3:12	Las Vegas, Nevada, United States	Performance of the Night.
Win	14–6–1	Kron Gracie	Decision (unanimous)	UFC 288	May 6, 2023	3	5:00	Newark, New Jersey, United States	
Loss	13–6–1	Nathaniel Wood	Decision (unanimous)	UFC Fight Night: Gane vs. Tuivasa	September 3, 2022	3	5:00	Paris, France	
Loss	13–5–1	Shane Burgos	Decision (majority)	UFC on ABC: Ortega vs. Rodríguez	July 16, 2022	3	5:00	Elmont, New York, United States	
Win	13–4–1	Lando Vannata	Submission (guillotine choke)	UFC Fight Night: Lemos vs. Andrade	April 23, 2022	1	2:32	Las Vegas, Nevada, United States	
Win	12–4–1	Andre Ewell	Decision (unanimous)	UFC Fight Night: Lewis vs. Daukaus	December 18, 2021	3	5:00	Las Vegas, Nevada, United States	
Loss	11–4–1	Julian Erosa	Submission (brabo choke)	UFC Fight Night: Brunson vs. Till	September 4, 2021	3	2:56	Las Vegas, Nevada, United States	Catchweight (150 lb) bout.
Win	11–3–1	Marcelo Rojo	TKO (punches)	UFC Fight Night: Edwards vs. Muhammad	March 13, 2021	3	4:31	Las Vegas, Nevada, United States	
Draw	10–3–1	Joshua Culibao	Draw (split)	UFC on ESPN: Holm vs. Aldana	October 4, 2020	3	5:00	Abu Dhabi, United Arab Emirates	
Loss	10–3	Andre Fili	Decision (split)	UFC on ESPN: Eye vs. Calvillo	June 13, 2020	3	5:00	Las Vegas, Nevada, United States	
Win	10–2	Choi Doo-ho	TKO (punches)	UFC Fight Night: Edgar vs. The Korean Zombie	December 21, 2019	2	4:32	Busan, South Korea	Return to Featherweight. Fight of the Night.
Loss	9–2	Desmond Green	Decision (unanimous)	UFC Fight Night: dos Anjos vs. Lee	May 18, 2019	3	5:00	Rochester, New York, United States	
Win	9–1	Damien Lapilus	TKO (punches)	TKO 47	April 11, 2019	5	2:02	Montreal, Quebec, Canada	Return to Lightweight. Won the interim TKO Lightweight Championship.
Win	8–1	Alex Morgan	Submission (guillotine choke)	TKO 45	December 27, 2018	1	4:38	Montreal, Quebec, Canada	Won the TKO Featherweight Championship.
Win	7–1	Kevin Généreux	Submission (rear naked choke)	TKO Fight Night 1	August 2, 2018	2	4:08	Montreal, Quebec, Canada	Catchweight (150 lb) bout.
Win	6–1	Matar Lo	KO (punches)	TKO 42	March 16, 2018	1	2:19	Laval, Quebec, Canada	
Loss	5–1	T.J. Laramie	Decision (unanimous)	TKO 41	December 8, 2017	5	5:00	Montreal, Quebec, Canada	For the vacant TKO Featherweight Championship.
Win	5–0	William Romero	TKO (punches)	TKO 39	June 16, 2017	3	2:04	Saint-Roch-de-l'Achigan, Quebec, Canada	
Win	4–0	Mathieu Morciano	TKO (punches)	TKO 38	April 7, 2017	2	1:42	Montreal, Quebec, Canada	Return to Featherweight.
Win	3–0	Michael Cyr	Submission (rear naked choke)	TKO 37	January 13, 2017	2	1:29	Montreal, Quebec, Canada	Lightweight debut.
Win	2–0	Marc-Antoine Lidji	TKO (punches)	TKO 36	November 4, 2016	3	4:02	Montreal, Quebec, Canada	Featherweight debut.
Win	1–0	Thomas Sumantri	KO (flying knee)	LAMMQ 5	May 21, 2016	1	4:32	Quebec City, Quebec, Canada	Catchweight (150 lb) bout. Knockout of the Night.

== See also ==
- List of current UFC fighters
- List of Canadian UFC fighters
- List of male mixed martial artists
