= Jeremy Stephens =

American mixed martial arts fighter

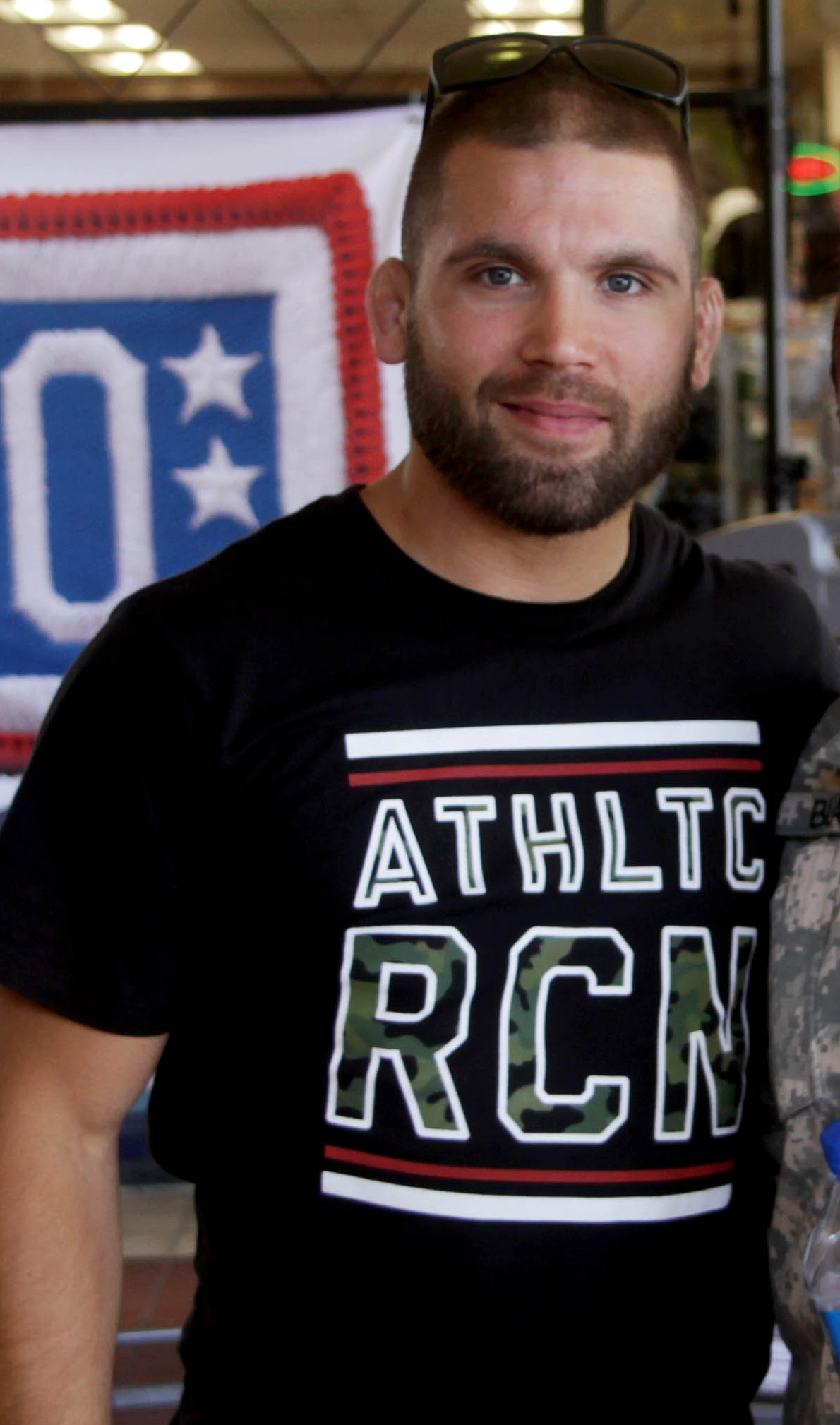
- Stephens in 2017
- Born: Jeremy Dean Stephens; May 26, 1986 (age 40); Des Moines, Iowa, U.S.
- Nickname: Lil Heathen
- Height: 5 ft 9 in (175 cm)
- Weight: 160 lb (73 kg; 11 st 6 lb)
- Division: Welterweight (Boxing); Lightweight / Featherweight (MMA)
- Reach: 71 in (180 cm)
- Fighting out of: San Diego, California, U.S.
- Team: Alliance MMA
- Rank: Purple belt in Brazilian Jiu-Jitsu
- Years active: 2005–present (mma); 2023–present (boxing)

Professional boxing record
- Total: 2
- Losses: 1
- Draws: 1

Mixed martial arts record
- Total: 53
- Wins: 29
- By knockout: 19
- By submission: 2
- By decision: 8
- Losses: 23
- By knockout: 3
- By submission: 6
- By decision: 14
- No contests: 1

Other information
- Website: jeremystephens.com
- Boxing record from BoxRec
- Mixed martial arts record from Sherdog

Jeremy Dean Stephens (born May 26, 1986) is an American professional mixed martial artist, bare-knuckle boxer and professional boxer, who currently competes in the Lightweight division of the Ultimate Fighting Championship (UFC). A professional since 2005, he also spent time in the Professional Fighters League (PFL).

== Background ==
Stephens was born in Des Moines, Iowa, on May 26, 1986, and came from a broken home. When he was eight years old, Stephens parents divorced and he constantly switched between schools while also living in various apartments, shelters, and even in his mother's car before moving to Norwalk, Iowa, with his father, who was granted custody of Stephens when he was in the fifth grade. Growing up, Stephens played baseball, basketball, and also competed in wrestling. Stephens attended Norwalk High School where he was a standout in baseball and wrestling, having returned to wrestling during his senior year. Stephens was introduced to mixed martial arts by his grandfather who had also originally persuaded Stephens to compete in wrestling. While beginning his career in mixed martial arts, Stephens looked up to and later became friends with fellow Des Moines native Josh Neer.

== Mixed martial arts career ==
=== Early career ===
At age 16, Stephens began mixed martial arts as an amateur and began full-time training at the age of 18. Stephens was the UGC and MCC Lightweight Champion.

=== Ultimate Fighting Championship ===
==== 2007 ====
Stephens was defeated via second round armbar submission in his UFC debut against veteran Din Thomas at UFC 71 on May 26, 2007.

His first win in the UFC was against Diego Saraiva at UFC 76 via unanimous decision.

==== 2008 ====
Jeremy then scored his second win inside the Octagon after beating Cole Miller via second-round TKO at UFC Fight Night 12.

At the finale of The Ultimate Fighter 7, Jeremy took on former trainer and friend Spencer Fisher. Stephens lost via unanimous decision.

After the loss he rebounded with an emphatic come from behind knockout victory over BJJ black belt and future UFC Lightweight Champion, Rafael dos Anjos at UFC 91. He was out-grappled the first two rounds but in the third came out swinging and landed a huge uppercut on dos Anjos that knocked him unconscious. This win earned him the $60,000 Knockout of the Night award.

==== 2009 ====
Stephens next stepped in as a late replacement for Hermes Franca against Joe Lauzon on February 7, 2009, at UFC Fight Night 17. Lauzon defeated Stephens with an armbar late in the second round.

Then on April 1, 2009, at UFC Fight Night: Condit vs Kampmann, Stephens was out-wrestled by Gleison Tibau and lost his second straight fight via unanimous decision.

Stephens was expected to return to the octagon on September 16, 2009, at UFC Fight Night: Diaz vs. Guillard against UFC newcomer Ronnys Torres. However, Torres sustained an injury during training and was replaced by Justin Buchholz. Stephens defeated Buchholz after landing several big strikes and opening up a deep gash on Buchholz's forehead, forcing the doctor to stop the fight midway through the first round. This win earned him a $30,000 Knockout of the Night award.

==== 2010 ====
Stephens was expected to face Nik Lentz on January 11, 2010, at UFC Fight Night 20. However, Stephens suffered a cut and was forced to pull out of the fight.

Stephens defeated Sam Stout via split decision on May 8, 2010, at UFC 113. He won the fight via split decision. This win earned him a $65,000 Fight of the Night award.

Stephens lost to Melvin Guillard on September 25, 2010, at UFC 119 via split decision.

==== 2011 ====
Stephens faced Marcus Davis on January 1, 2011, at UFC 125. After likely losing the first two rounds, Stephens then came out more aggressive in the third round and caught Davis with a counter punch resulting in a KO win. This win earned him a $60,000 Knockout of the Night award.

Stephens was expected to face Jonathan Brookins on June 4, 2011, at The Ultimate Fighter 13 Finale. However, Brookins was forced from the bout with an injury and replaced by Danny Downes. Stephens defeated Downes via unanimous decision after dominating all three rounds.

Stephens faced Anthony Pettis on October 8, 2011, at UFC 136. Pettis defeated Stephens via split decision (29-28, 28–29, 29-28).

==== 2012 ====
Stephens replaced an injured Yves Edwards against Donald Cerrone on May 15, 2012, at UFC on Fuel TV: Korean Zombie vs. Poirier He lost the fight via unanimous decision.

Stephens was expected to face Yves Edwards on October 5, 2012, at UFC on FX 5. However, the bout was cancelled due to Stephens being arrested on the day of the event for an assault charge that dates back to 2011. The fight eventually took place on December 8, 2012, at UFC on Fox 5. Edwards won by knockout in the first round, being the first fighter to ever stop Stephens via strikes.

==== 2013 ====
Stephens made his Featherweight debut against promotional newcomer Estevan Payan on May 25, 2013, at UFC 160. He won the bloody fight via unanimous decision.

Stephens was expected to face Rony Jason on October 9, 2013, at UFC Fight Night 29. However, Jason pulled out of the bout citing an injury (lumbar hernia). The bout eventually took place on November 9, 2013, at UFC Fight Night 32. Stephens won via knockout early in the first round.

==== 2014 ====
Stephens faced Darren Elkins on January 25, 2014, at UFC on Fox 10. He won the fight via unanimous decision.

Stephens faced Cub Swanson on June 28, 2014, at UFC Fight Night 44. He lost the fight via unanimous decision. This fight earned him a $50,000 Fight of the Night award.

Stephens next faced Charles Oliveira on December 12, 2014, at The Ultimate Fighter 20 Finale. He lost the fight by unanimous decision.

==== 2015 ====
Stephens faced Dennis Bermudez on July 11, 2015, at UFC 189. He won the fight by TKO due to a flying knee and punches after a close first two rounds.

Stephens faced Max Holloway on December 12, 2015, at UFC 194. He lost the fight via unanimous decision.

==== 2016 ====
Stephens faced former UFC Bantamweight Champion Renan Barão on May 29, 2016, at UFC Fight Night 88. He won the back and forth bout by unanimous decision. Both participants were awarded Fight of the Night honors for their performance.

Stephens faced former UFC Lightweight Champion Frankie Edgar on November 12, 2016, at UFC 205. He lost the fight via unanimous decision.

==== 2017 ====
Stephens faced Renato Moicano on April 15, 2017, at UFC on Fox 24. He lost the fight by split decision.

Stephens faced Gilbert Melendez on September 9, 2017, at UFC 215. He won the fight via unanimous decision. Both participants were awarded Fight of the Night honors for their performance.

==== 2018 ====
Stephens faced Doo Ho Choi on January 14, 2018, at UFC Fight Night: Stephens vs. Choi. He won the fight via TKO in the second round. Both participants were awarded Fight of the Night.

Stephens faced Josh Emmett on February 24, 2018, at UFC on Fox 28. He won the fight via knockout in round two. This win earned him a Performance of the Night bonus.

Stephens next faced former WEC Featherweight Champion and 2-time UFC Featherweight Champion José Aldo, on July 28, 2018, at UFC on Fox: Alvarez vs. Poirier 2. He lost the fight via TKO in the first round.

==== 2019 ====
Stephens faced Zabit Magomedsharipov on March 2, 2019, at UFC 235. He lost the fight via unanimous decision.

Stephens faced Yair Rodríguez on September 21, 2019, in the main event at UFC on ESPN+ 17. The bout ended in a "No Contest" just 15 seconds into the first round after Rodríguez accidentally swatted Stephens in the left eye, rendering Stephens unable to continue.

Stephens faced Yair Rodríguez in a rematch on October 18, 2019, at UFC on ESPN 6. He lost the fight via unanimous decision. This fight earned him the Fight of the Night award.

==== 2020 ====
Stephens was scheduled to Calvin Kattar on April 18, 2020, at UFC 249. However, on April 9, Dana White, the president of UFC announced that this event was postponed and the bout eventually took place on May 9, 2020. At the weigh-ins on May 8, Stephens missed weight, weighing in at 150.5 pounds, 4.5 pounds over the non-title featherweight limit. As a result, the bout proceeded as a catchweight bout and Stephens was fined 20% of his purse. Despite having success and out-striking Kattar in the first round, Stephens lost the fight via technical knockout in round two.

Stephens was scheduled to face Arnold Allen on November 7, 2020, at UFC on ESPN: Santos vs. Teixeira. However, Stephens was forced to withdraw from the event, citing injury.

==== 2021 ====
Stephens was expected to return to the lightweight division for the first one since 2012 to face Drakkar Klose at UFC on ESPN 22. However, day of the event, it was announced that the bout was scrapped due to Klose sustaining a spinal injury as a result of being shoved by Stephens at the weigh-ins.

Stephens faced Mateusz Gamrot on July 17, 2021, at UFC on ESPN: Makhachev vs. Moisés. He lost the fight via submission in round one.

==== 2022 ====
In late-January 2022, it was announced that after a nearly 15 year tenure and 33 fights in the UFC, Stephens contract was not renewed after his most recent fight for the promotion.

=== Professional Fighters League ===
After his contract was not renewed by the UFC, Stephens signed with PFL for the 2022 season to compete in their Lightweight division.

In his promotional debut, Stephens faced Clay Collard on April 23, 2022, at PFL 1. In a back and forth affair, Stephens lost the bout via unanimous decision.

Stephens faced Myles Price on June 17, 2022, at PFL 4. He won the bout via split decision.

Stephens faced Natan Schulte on November 25, 2022, at PFL 10. Stephens lost the bout in the second round, getting submitted by arm-triangle choke.

=== Global Fight League ===
On December 11, 2024, it was announced that Stephens was signed by Global Fight League. However, in April 2025, it was reported that all GFL events were cancelled indefinitely.

=== Return to UFC ===
==== 2025 ====
Stephens made his return to the UFC in a bout against former Cage Warriors Lightweight and Welterweight Champion Mason Jones in his hometown of Des Moines, Iowa on May 3, 2025 at UFC on ESPN 67. He lost the fight by unanimous decision. This 19th UFC loss ties him with Clay Guida for most losses in UFC history.

==== 2026 ====
Stephens faced King Green on May 9, 2026 at UFC 328. At the weigh-ins, Stephens weighed in at 160 pounds, 4 pounds over the lightweight non-title fight limit. His bout proceeded at catchweight and he was fined 30 percent of his purse, which went to Green. He lost the fight by submission via a rear-naked choke in the first round.

== Professional boxing career ==
=== Stephens vs. Aldo ===
On April 1, 2023, Stephens made his professional boxing debut against Brazilian mixed martial artist José Aldo on the undercard of Roy Jones Jr. vs. Anthony Pettis at the Fiserv Forum in Milwaukee, Wisconsin. The bout ended via majority draw.

=== Stephens vs. Avila ===
On June 21, 2023, it was announced that Stephens would face American mixed martial artist Chris Avila on the undercard of Jake Paul vs. Nate Diaz at the American Airlines Center in Dallas, Texas. Avila missed weight (170lbs) and was fined a percentage of his purse. Avila defeated Stephens via unanimous decision.

== Bare-knuckle boxing ==
Stephens faced Jimmie Rivera on December 2, 2023, at BKFC 56 and won by TKO due to doctor stoppage.

Stephens faced Bobby Taylor on September 6, 2024 at BKFC 65. He won the fight by unanimous decision. This fight earned him a Performance of the Night award.

Stephens faced Eddie Alvarez at BKFC Knucklemania 5 at Wells Fargo Center in Philadelphia, PA on January 25, 2025. Stephens scored two knockdowns and won the fight via third-round TKO, as Alvarez was not able to return for the fourth round.

Stephens challenged Mike Perry at BKFC 82 for the King of Violence Championship in Newark, New Jersey, on October 4, 2025. After being knocked down six times, he lost by technical knockout in the fifth round. This fight earned him a Fight of the Night award.

== Personal life ==
Stephens is of Mexican descent maternally. He has two daughters and is a good friend of former UFC Fighter Anton Kuivanen. Stephens has spoken about how self-doubt has affected his life and how his failures have led to suicidal thoughts in the past.

On October 5, 2012, the date Stephens was supposed to fight at UFC on FX: Browne vs. Bigfoot, Stephens was arrested in Minneapolis, Minnesota, after Minneapolis PD served an arrest warrant. Stephens was charged with felony assault and burglary, stemming from an incident that took place in Des Moines, Iowa, in 2011. Stephens was then extradited to the Polk County jail where he was incarcerated for 15 days before being released. Most of the charges, however, were eventually dropped, and Stephens pled guilty to one count of disorderly conduct, a misdemeanor.

== Championships and accomplishments ==
=== Mixed martial arts ===
- Ultimate Fighting Championship
  - Knockout of the Night (Three times) vs. Rafael dos Anjos, Justin Buchholz, and Marcus Davis
  - Fight of the Night (Six times) vs. Renan Barão, Cub Swanson, Sam Stout, Gilbert Melendez, Choi Doo-ho and Yair Rodríguez
  - Performance of the Night (One time) vs. Josh Emmett
  - Tied (Anderson Silva) for second most knockdowns in UFC history (18) (behind Donald Cerrone)
    - Third most knockdowns in UFC Featherweight division history (11)
    - Tied (Mirko Cro Cop) for sixth most knockdowns landed in Zuffa, LLC (UFC, Pride, WEC, Strikeforce) history (18)
  - Eighth most bouts in UFC history (36)
  - Most losses in UFC history (20)
    - Tied (Jim Miller) for most decision losses in UFC history (13)
  - UFC.com Awards
    - 2008: Ranked #10 Knockout of the Year vs. Rafael dos Anjos
    - 2010: Ranked #10 Fight of the Year vs. Sam Stout
    - 2019: Ranked #10 Fight of the Year vs. Yair Rodriguez 2
- MMA Fighting
  - 2008 #4 Ranked UFC Knockout of the Year vs. Rafael dos Anjos at UFC 91
- MMA Junkie
  - 2014 June Fight of the Month vs. Cub Swanson
  - 2019 October Fight of the Month vs. Yair Rodríguez

=== Bare-knuckle boxing ===
- Bare Knuckle Fighting Championship
  - Performance of the Night (One time) vs. Bobby Taylor
  - Fight of the Night (One time) vs. Mike Perry

== Mixed martial arts record ==
Professional record breakdown
53 matches	29 wins	23 losses
By knockout	19	3
By submission	2	6
By decision	8	14
No contests	1	

Res.	Record	Opponent	Method	Event	Date	Round	Time	Location	Notes
Loss	29–23 (1)	King Green	Submission (rear-naked choke)	UFC 328	May 9, 2026	1	4:20	Newark, New Jersey, United States	Catchweight (160 lb) bout; Stephens missed weight.
Loss	29–22 (1)	Mason Jones	Decision (unanimous)	UFC on ESPN: Sandhagen vs. Figueiredo	May 3, 2025	3	5:00	Des Moines, Iowa, United States	
Loss	29–21 (1)	Natan Schulte	Submission (arm-triangle choke)	PFL 10 (2022)	November 25, 2022	2	1:32	New York City, New York, United States	
Win	29–20 (1)	Myles Price	Decision (split)	PFL 4 (2022)	June 17, 2022	3	5:00	Atlanta, Georgia, United States	
Loss	28–20 (1)	Clay Collard	Decision (unanimous)	PFL 1 (2022)	April 20, 2022	3	5:00	Arlington, Texas, United States	
Loss	28–19 (1)	Mateusz Gamrot	Submission (kimura)	UFC on ESPN: Makhachev vs. Moisés	July 17, 2021	1	1:05	Las Vegas, Nevada, United States	Return to Lightweight.
Loss	28–18 (1)	Calvin Kattar	KO (elbows)	UFC 249	May 9, 2020	2	2:42	Jacksonville, Florida, United States	Catchweight (150.5 lb) bout; Stephens missed weight.
Loss	28–17 (1)	Yair Rodríguez	Decision (unanimous)	UFC on ESPN: Reyes vs. Weidman	October 18, 2019	3	5:00	Boston, Massachusetts, United States	Fight of the Night.
NC	28–16 (1)	Yair Rodríguez	NC (accidental eye poke)	UFC Fight Night: Rodríguez vs. Stephens	September 21, 2019	1	0:15	Mexico City, Mexico	Accidental eye poke rendered Stephens unable to continue.
Loss	28–16	Zabit Magomedsharipov	Decision (unanimous)	UFC 235	March 2, 2019	3	5:00	Las Vegas, Nevada, United States	
Loss	28–15	José Aldo	TKO (punches)	UFC on Fox: Alvarez vs. Poirier 2	July 28, 2018	1	4:19	Calgary, Alberta, Canada	
Win	28–14	Josh Emmett	KO (elbows)	UFC on Fox: Emmett vs. Stephens	February 24, 2018	2	1:35	Orlando, Florida, United States	Performance of the Night.
Win	27–14	Choi Doo-ho	TKO (punches and elbows)	UFC Fight Night: Stephens vs. Choi	January 14, 2018	2	2:36	St. Louis, Missouri, United States	Fight of the Night.
Win	26–14	Gilbert Melendez	Decision (unanimous)	UFC 215	September 9, 2017	3	5:00	Edmonton, Alberta, Canada	Fight of the Night.
Loss	25–14	Renato Moicano	Decision (split)	UFC on Fox: Johnson vs. Reis	April 15, 2017	3	5:00	Kansas City, Missouri, United States	
Loss	25–13	Frankie Edgar	Decision (unanimous)	UFC 205	November 12, 2016	3	5:00	New York City, New York, United States	
Win	25–12	Renan Barão	Decision (unanimous)	UFC Fight Night: Almeida vs. Garbrandt	May 29, 2016	3	5:00	Las Vegas, Nevada, United States	Fight of the Night.
Loss	24–12	Max Holloway	Decision (unanimous)	UFC 194	December 12, 2015	3	5:00	Las Vegas, Nevada, United States	
Win	24–11	Dennis Bermudez	TKO (flying knee and punches)	UFC 189	July 11, 2015	3	0:32	Las Vegas, Nevada, United States	Catchweight (149.5 lb) bout; Stephens missed weight.
Loss	23–11	Charles Oliveira	Decision (unanimous)	The Ultimate Fighter: A Champion Will Be Crowned Finale	December 12, 2014	3	5:00	Las Vegas, Nevada, United States	Catchweight (146.5 lb) bout; Oliveira missed weight.
Loss	23–10	Cub Swanson	Decision (unanimous)	UFC Fight Night: Swanson vs. Stephens	June 28, 2014	5	5:00	San Antonio, Texas, United States	Fight of the Night.
Win	23–9	Darren Elkins	Decision (unanimous)	UFC on Fox: Henderson vs. Thomson	January 25, 2014	3	5:00	Chicago, Illinois, United States	
Win	22–9	Rony Jason	KO (head kick)	UFC Fight Night: Belfort vs. Henderson 2	November 9, 2013	1	0:40	Goiânia, Brazil	
Win	21–9	Estevan Payan	Decision (unanimous)	UFC 160	May 25, 2013	3	5:00	Las Vegas, Nevada, United States	Featherweight debut.
Loss	20–9	Yves Edwards	KO (punches and elbows)	UFC on Fox: Henderson vs. Diaz	December 8, 2012	1	1:55	Seattle, Washington, United States	
Loss	20–8	Donald Cerrone	Decision (unanimous)	UFC on Fuel TV: The Korean Zombie vs. Poirier	May 15, 2012	3	5:00	Fairfax, Virginia, United States	
Loss	20–7	Anthony Pettis	Decision (split)	UFC 136	October 8, 2011	3	5:00	Houston, Texas, United States	
Win	20–6	Danny Downes	Decision (unanimous)	The Ultimate Fighter: Team Lesnar vs. Team dos Santos Finale	June 4, 2011	3	5:00	Las Vegas, Nevada, United States	
Win	19–6	Marcus Davis	KO (punch)	UFC 125	January 1, 2011	3	2:33	Las Vegas, Nevada, United States	Knockout of the Night.
Loss	18–6	Melvin Guillard	Decision (split)	UFC 119	September 25, 2010	3	5:00	Indianapolis, Indiana, United States	
Win	18–5	Sam Stout	Decision (split)	UFC 113	May 8, 2010	3	5:00	Montreal, Quebec, Canada	Fight of the Night.
Win	17–5	Justin Buchholz	TKO (doctor stoppage)	UFC Fight Night: Diaz vs. Guillard	September 16, 2009	1	3:32	Oklahoma City, Oklahoma, United States	Knockout of the Night.
Loss	16–5	Gleison Tibau	Decision (unanimous)	UFC Fight Night: Condit vs. Kampmann	April 1, 2009	3	5:00	Nashville, Tennessee, United States	
Loss	16–4	Joe Lauzon	Submission (armbar)	UFC Fight Night: Lauzon vs. Stephens	February 7, 2009	2	4:43	Tampa, Florida, United States	
Win	16–3	Rafael dos Anjos	KO (punches)	UFC 91	November 15, 2008	3	0:39	Las Vegas, Nevada, United States	Knockout of the Night.
Loss	15–3	Spencer Fisher	Decision (unanimous)	The Ultimate Fighter: Team Rampage vs. Team Forrest Finale	June 21, 2008	3	5:00	Las Vegas, Nevada, United States	
Win	15–2	Cole Miller	TKO (punches and elbows)	UFC Fight Night: Swick vs. Burkman	January 23, 2008	2	4:44	Las Vegas, Nevada, United States	
Win	14–2	Diego Saraiva	Decision (unanimous)	UFC 76	September 22, 2007	3	5:00	Anaheim, California, United States	
Win	13–2	Nick Walker	TKO (punches)	Midwest Cage 9	July 27, 2007	1	4:45	Des Moines, Iowa, United States	
Loss	12–2	Din Thomas	Submission (armbar)	UFC 71	May 26, 2007	2	2:44	Las Vegas, Nevada, United States	
Win	12–1	Vern Jefferson	TKO (punches)	Greensparks: Full Contact Fighting 3	March 17, 2007	1	3:58	Des Moines, Iowa, United States	
Win	11–1	Norm Alexander	Submission (triangle choke)	Title FC: Battle at the Barn	February 21, 2007	1	3:26	Des Moines, Iowa, United States	
Win	10–1	Chris Mickle	KO (punch)	Midwest Cage 5	November 22, 2006	4	0:27	Des Moines, Iowa, United States	
Win	9–1	Aaron Williams	TKO (punches)	Universal Gladiator 4	September 22, 2006	1	N/A	Kenner, Louisiana, United States	
Win	8–1	Doug Alcorn	Submission (armbar)	Greensparks: Full Contact Fighting 1	August 19, 2006	1	1:56	Clive, Iowa, United States	
Win	7–1	Chris Mickle	TKO (punches)	Midwest Cage 4	July 15, 2006	2	3:36	Des Moines, Iowa, United States	
Win	6–1	Kendrick Johnson	KO (punch)	Midwest Cage 1	February 11, 2006	1	1:46	Des Moines, Iowa, United States	
Win	5–1	Will Shutt	TKO (punches)	Xtreme Kage Kombat: Trials	August 27, 2005	1	1:19	Des Moines, Iowa, United States	
Win	4–1	Sharome Blanchard	TKO (punches)	Xtreme Kage Kombat: Des Moines	March 19, 2005	1	2:36	Des Moines, Iowa, United States	
Loss	3–1	Chris Mickle	Submission (rear-naked choke)	Downtown Destruction 3	March 2, 2005	2	1:51	Des Moines, Iowa, United States	
Win	3–0	Chris Caleb	KO (punch)	Downtown Destruction 2	February 2, 2005	1	1:44	Owatonna, Minnesota, United States	
Win	2–0	Gary Percival	TKO (submission to punches)	Jungle Madness 2	January 15, 2005	1	N/A	Des Moines, Iowa, United States	
Win	1–0	Ted Worthington	KO (punches)	Downtown Destruction 1	January 12, 2005	1	0:33	Des Moines, Iowa, United States	Lightweight debut.

== Professional boxing record ==
2 fights	0 wins	1 loss
By decision	0	1
Draws	1	

No.	Result	Record	Opponent	Type	Round, time	Date	Location	Notes
2	Loss	0–1–1	Chris Avila	UD	6	Aug 5, 2023	American Airlines Center, Dallas, Texas, U.S.	
1	Draw	0–0–1	José Aldo	MD	6	Apr 1, 2023	Fiserv Forum, Milwaukee, Wisconsin, U.S.	

== Bare-knuckle boxing record ==
Professional record breakdown
4 matches	3 wins	1 loss
By knockout	2	1
By decision	1	0

Res.	Record	Opponent	Method	Event	Date	Round	Time	Location	Notes
Loss	3–1	Mike Perry	TKO (punches)	BKFC 82	October 4, 2025	5	1:35	Newark, New Jersey, United States	For the symbolic King of Violence Championship. Fight of the Night.
Win	3–0	Eddie Alvarez	TKO (corner stoppage)	BKFC Knucklemania V	January 25, 2025	3	2:00	Philadelphia, Pennsylvania, United States	
Win	2–0	Bobby Taylor	Decision (unanimous)	BKFC 65	September 6, 2024	5	2:00	Salt Lake City, Utah, United States	Performance of the Night.
Win	1–0	Jimmie Rivera	TKO (doctor stoppage)	BKFC 56	December 2, 2023	3	2:00	Salt Lake City, Utah, United States	

== See also ==
- List of male boxers
- List of male mixed martial artists
- List of mixed martial artists with professional boxing records
- List of multi-sport athletes
