= David Onama =

Ugandan mixed martial artist

- Born: David Aliga Onama; June 7, 1994 (age 32); Kyangwali, Uganda
- Other names: Silent Assassin
- Height: 5 ft 11 in (180 cm)
- Weight: 145 lb (66 kg; 10 st 5 lb)
- Division: Featherweight (2019–present); Lightweight (2019, 2021, 2024)
- Reach: 72 in (183 cm)
- Fighting out of: Kansas City, Missouri, U.S.
- Years active: 2019–present

Mixed martial arts record
- Total: 17
- Wins: 14
- By knockout: 7
- By submission: 4
- By decision: 3
- Losses: 3
- By knockout: 1
- By decision: 2

Other information
- Mixed martial arts record from Sherdog

David Aliga Onama (born June 7, 1994) is a Ugandan professional mixed martial artist, currently competing in the Featherweight division of the Ultimate Fighting Championship (UFC).

== Early life ==
Onama was born on 7 June 1994 in the Kyangwali Refugee Settlement in Uganda. His family later relocated to the United States, and he now fights out of Kansas City, Missouri, training at FactoryX Muay Thai.

== Mixed martial arts career ==
=== Early career ===
As an amateur, Onama amassed a record of 10–0. Before signing with the UFC, Onama had an undefeated record of 8–0.

=== Ultimate Fighting Championship ===
Onama made his debut against Mason Jones on short notice at UFC Fight Night 196 as a replacement for Alan Patrick after he withdrew. He lost the fight via unanimous decision.

Onama faced Gabriel Benitez on February 19, 2022 at UFC Fight Night 201 on 18 days notice. He won the fight via first round knockout. This win earned him a Performance of the Night award.

Onama was scheduled to face Austin Lingo on July 9, 2022 at UFC on ESPN 39, but Lingo withdrew for undisclosed reasons during fight week and was replaced by Garrett Armfield. He won via arm triangle in the second round.

Onama fought Nate Landwehr on August 13, 2022 at UFC on ESPN 41. He lost the bout by majority decision. This fight earned him a Fight of the Night award.

Onama was scheduled to fight Jarno Errens on January 14, 2023 at UFC Fight Night 217, but the bout was scrapped due to Errens sustaining a shoulder injury.

Onama was scheduled to face Khusein Askhabov on June 3, 2023 at UFC on ESPN 46, but Askhabov withdrew after being arrested in Thailand.

Onama faced Gabriel Santos on June 24, 2023 at UFC on ABC 5. He won the bout via uppercut KO in round 2. This win earned him a Performance of the Night award.

Onama was scheduled to face Lucas Alexander on November 4, 2023 at UFC Fight Night 231, however, he would pull out due to an undisclosed injury.

Onama faced Jonathan Pearce on April 27, 2024 at UFC on ESPN 55. He won the bout via unanimous decision.

Onama faced Roberto Romero on November 16, 2024 at UFC 309. He won the bout via unanimous decision.

Onama faced Giga Chikadze on April 26, 2025 at UFC on ESPN 66. He won the bout via unanimous decision and earned himself a ranking in the top 15 of the featherweight division.

Onama faced Steve Garcia in the main event on November 1, 2025, at UFC Fight Night 263. He suffered his first stoppage loss via technical knockout in the first round.

== Personal life ==
During the octagon interview after his win at UFC 309, Onama gave a shoutout to country singer Zach Bryan. It was revealed later that he did this because Bryan's management team offered Onama and his team free tickets if he received a live shoutout.

== Championships and accomplishments ==
=== Mixed martial arts ===
- Ultimate Fighting Championship
  - Performance of the Night (two times) vs. Gabriel Benitez and Gabriel Santos
  - Fight of the Night vs. Nate Landwehr
- Fighting Alliance Championship
  - FAC Lightweight Championship (One time)

== Mixed martial arts record ==
Professional record breakdown
17 matches	14 wins	3 losses
By knockout	7	1
By submission	4	0
By decision	3	2

Res.	Record	Opponent	Method	Event	Date	Round	Time	Location	Notes
Loss	14–3	Steve Garcia	TKO (punches)	UFC Fight Night: Garcia vs. Onama	November 1, 2025	1	3:34	Las Vegas, Nevada, United States	
Win	14–2	Giga Chikadze	Decision (unanimous)	UFC on ESPN: Machado Garry vs. Prates	April 26, 2025	3	5:00	Kansas City, Missouri, United States	Catchweight (147 lb) bout; Chikadze missed weight.
Win	13–2	Roberto Romero	Decision (unanimous)	UFC 309	November 16, 2024	3	5:00	New York City, New York, United States	Lightweight bout.
Win	12–2	Jonathan Pearce	Decision (unanimous)	UFC on ESPN: Nicolau vs. Perez	April 27, 2024	3	5:00	Las Vegas, Nevada, United States	Catchweight (148.5 lb) bout; Onama missed weight.
Win	11–2	Gabriel Santos	KO (punch)	UFC on ABC: Emmett vs. Topuria	June 24, 2023	2	4:13	Jacksonville, Florida, United States	Performance of the Night.
Loss	10–2	Nate Landwehr	Decision (majority)	UFC on ESPN: Vera vs. Cruz	August 13, 2022	3	5:00	San Diego, California, United States	Fight of the Night.
Win	10–1	Garrett Armfield	Technical Submission (arm-triangle choke)	UFC on ESPN: dos Anjos vs. Fiziev	July 9, 2022	2	3:13	Las Vegas, Nevada, United States	
Win	9–1	Gabriel Benítez	KO (punches)	UFC Fight Night: Walker vs. Hill	February 19, 2022	1	4:24	Las Vegas, Nevada, United States	Return to Featherweight; Benítez missed weight (148 lb). Performance of the Night.
Loss	8–1	Mason Jones	Decision (unanimous)	UFC Fight Night: Costa vs. Vettori	October 23, 2021	3	5:00	Las Vegas, Nevada, United States	
Win	8–0	Brad Robison	KO (punches)	Fighting Alliance Championship 10	October 8, 2021	1	2:12	Independence, Missouri, United States	Won the vacant FAC Lightweight Championship.
Win	7–0	Mike Plazola	TKO (knee injury)	Fighting Alliance Championship 7	March 5, 2021	1	0:44	Kansas City, Missouri, United States	Return to Lightweight.
Win	6–0	Justin Overton	Submission (guillotine choke)	Fighting Alliance Championship 4	October 9, 2020	3	1:42	Independence, Missouri, United States	
Win	5–0	Sam Agushi	TKO (punches)	Fighting Alliance Championship 3	August 20, 2020	1	3:48	Independence, Missouri, United States	
Win	4–0	Antonio Castillo Jr.	TKO (punches)	Fighting Alliance Championship 2	February 22, 2020	1	3:01	Independence, Missouri, United States	
Win	3–0	Sam Hernandez	Submission (rear-naked choke)	Kansas City Fighting Alliance 34	July 27, 2019	2	1:41	Independence, Missouri, United States	Featherweight debut.
Win	2–0	Raymond Bighead	Submission (guillotine choke)	Kansas City Fighting Alliance 33	May 4, 2019	1	0:12	Independence, Missouri, United States	
Win	1–0	Francisco Pintos	TKO (punches)	Kansas City Fighting Alliance 32	February 23, 2019	2	1:30	Independence, Missouri, United States	Lightweight debut.

== See also ==
- List of current UFC fighters
- List of male mixed martial artists
