= UFC Fight Night: Burns vs. Malott =

Mixed martial arts event in 2026

- The poster for UFC Fight Night: Burns vs. Malott
- Promotion: Ultimate Fighting Championship
- Date: April 18, 2026
- Venue: Canada Life Centre
- City: Winnipeg, Manitoba, Canada
- Attendance: 14,051
- Total gate: $1,900,000

Event chronology
UFC 327: Procházka vs. Ulberg	UFC Fight Night: Burns vs. Malott	UFC Fight Night: Sterling vs. Zalal

UFC Fight Night: Burns vs. Malott (also known as UFC Fight Night 273) was a mixed martial arts event produced by the Ultimate Fighting Championship that took place on April 18, 2026, at the Canada Life Centre in Winnipeg, Manitoba, Canada.

== Background ==
The event marked the promotion's third visit to Winnipeg and first since UFC on Fox: Lawler vs. dos Anjos in December 2017. There were initial reports that the event was expected to take place in Ottawa, Ontario, but it was later shifted to Winnipeg for undisclosed reasons.

A welterweight bout between former UFC Welterweight Championship challenger Gilbert Burns and Mike Malott headlined the event.

A flyweight bout between Road to UFC Season 3 flyweight winner Choi Dong-hun and undefeated prospect André Lima was scheduled for this event. The bout was originally scheduled to take place at UFC 327 one week before, but was moved to this event for undisclosed reasons. In turn, Choi withdrew due to an injury, so the bout was scrapped and Lima was booked for a bout at a later date.

A featherweight bout between Choi Doo-ho and Gavin Tucker was briefly linked to this event. However, Tucker had not signed a bout agreement and subsequently announced his retirement from mixed martial arts due to injuries.

Mitch Raposo and Allan Nascimento were scheduled to meet in a flyweight bout at the preliminary card, but Raposo was forced off just two days before the event due to illness. They are expected to meet later in June at UFC Fight Night 279.

At the weigh-ins, a bantamweight bout between John Castañeda and promotional newcomer Mark Vologdin was changed to 139-pound catchweight bout, with Vologdin coming in at 138.5 pounds, while Castañeda weighing in at 139 pounds.

== Results ==
Fight card (Paramount+)
Weight class				Method	Round	Time	Notes
Welterweight	Mike Malott	def.	Gilbert Burns	TKO (punches)	3	2:08
Bantamweight	Charles Jourdain	def.	Kyler Phillips	Decision (unanimous) (29–28, 29–28, 29–28)	3	5:00
Lightweight	Jai Herbert	def.	Mandel Nallo	TKO (punches)	1	2:05
Women's Flyweight	Jasmine Jasudavicius	def.	Karine Silva	Decision (unanimous) (29–28, 29–28, 29–28)	3	5:00
Lightweight	Gauge Young	def.	Thiago Moisés	Decision (split) (29–28, 29–28, 28–29)	3	5:00
Preliminary card (Paramount+)
Featherweight	Márcio Barbosa	def.	Dennis Buzukja	KO (punch)	1	1:20
Middleweight	Robert Valentin	def.	Julien Leblanc	Submission (rear-naked choke)	1	2:22
Heavyweight	Gökhan Sarıçam	def.	Tanner Boser	TKO (punches)	2	4:43
Women's Bantamweight	Melissa Croden	def.	Darya Zheleznyakova	Decision (unanimous) (29–28, 29–28, 29–28)	3	5:00
Women's Flyweight	JJ Aldrich	def.	Jamey-Lyn Horth	Decision (unanimous) (29–28, 29–28, 29–28)	3	5:00
Catchweight (139 lb)	John Castañeda	vs.	Mark Vologdin	Draw (majority) (29–27, 28–28, 28–28)	3	5:00	(Note: Castañeda was deducted one point in round 2 due to repeated groin strikes.)
Bantamweight	John Yannis	def.	Jamie Siraj	TKO (punches and elbows)	1	2:43

== Bonus awards ==
The following fighters received $100,000 bonuses. The other finishes received $25,000 additional bonuses.

- Fight of the Night: Charles Jourdain vs. Kyler Phillips
- Performance of the Night: Mike Malott and Márcio Barbosa

== See also ==
- 2026 in UFC
- List of current UFC fighters
- List of UFC events
