= UFC on ESPN: Machado Garry vs. Prates =

Mixed martial arts event in 2025

- The poster for UFC on ESPN: Machado Garry vs. Prates
- Promotion: Ultimate Fighting Championship
- Date: April 26, 2025
- Venue: T-Mobile Center
- City: Kansas City, Missouri, United States
- Attendance: 15,984
- Total gate: $2,204,307

Event chronology
| UFC 314: Volkanovski vs. Lopes | UFC on ESPN: Machado Garry vs. Prates | UFC on ESPN: Sandhagen vs. Figueiredo |

UFC on ESPN: Machado Garry vs. Prates (also known as UFC on ESPN 66) was a mixed martial arts event produced by the Ultimate Fighting Championship that took on April 26, 2025, at the T-Mobile Center in Kansas City, Missouri, United States.

== Background ==
The event marked the promotion's third visit to Kansas City and first since UFC on ESPN: Holloway vs. Allen in April 2023. The event was held as part of "TKO Takeover", a series of three consecutive events held by TKO Group Holdings' main divisions Professional Bull Riders (PBR), UFC, and WWE, held on April 24, 26, and 28 (the last of which being a WWE Raw taping).

A light heavyweight bout between former UFC Light Heavyweight Champion Jamahal Hill and former title challenger Khalil Rountree Jr. was scheduled to headline the event. The pairing was previously expected to co-headline UFC 303 in last June, but it was scrapped as Rountree withdrew from the event after unintentionally ingesting DHEA in a tainted supplement. On April 1, the pairing was scrapped once again as Hill pulled out due to a lingering leg injury.

A welterweight bout between Ian Machado Garry and Carlos Prates served as the new event headliner.

A featherweight bout between Giga Chikadze and David Onama was scheduled for UFC Fight Night: Emmett vs. Murphy, but it was moved to this event for unknown reasons. At the weigh-ins, Chikadze weighed in at 147 pounds, one pound over the featherweight non-title fight limit. The bout proceeded at catchweight and he was fined 20 percent of his purse, which went to his opponent.

A middleweight bout between Ikram Aliskerov and André Muniz took place at the event. The pair was originally scheduled to compete at UFC on ESPN: Perez vs. Taira in June 2024, but Muniz withdrew from the bout after he suffered a foot fracture. Subsequently, the bout was rescheduled for UFC Fight Night: Adesanya vs. Imavov in February, but it was cancelled once again as Muniz and his team had visa issues.

A lightweight bout between Mitch Ramirez and Ahmad Sohail Hassanzada was scheduled for this event. However, Ramirez withdrew from the fight due to an injury and was replaced by Evan Elder. In turn, Hassanzada was removed from the event after being arrested on charges of alleged sexual assault and was replaced by promotional newcomer Gauge Young.

A featherweight bout between Chris Gutiérrez and John Castañeda took place at this event. They were previously scheduled to compete in a short notice contest at UFC 313 in March, but the bout was scrapped hours before taking place as Castañeda suffered an undisclosed illness.

== Results ==
Main card (ESPN2 / ESPN+)
| Weight class | | | | Method | Round | Time | Notes |
|---|---|---|---|---|---|---|---|
| Welterweight | Ian Machado Garry | def. | Carlos Prates | Decision (unanimous) (48–47, 48–47, 49–46) | 5 | 5:00 |
| Light Heavyweight | Zhang Mingyang | def. | Anthony Smith | TKO (elbows) | 1 | 4:03 |
| Catchweight (147 lb) | David Onama | def. | Giga Chikadze | Decision (unanimous) (29–28, 29–28, 29–28) | 3 | 5:00 |
| Middleweight | Abusupiyan Magomedov | def. | Michel Pereira | Decision (unanimous) (30–27, 30–27, 30–27) | 3 | 5:00 |
| Welterweight | Randy Brown | def. | Nicolas Dalby | KO (punch) | 2 | 1:39 |
| Middleweight | Ikram Aliskerov | def. | André Muniz | TKO (punches) | 1 | 4:54 |
Preliminary card (ESPN+)
| Flyweight | Matt Schnell | def. | Jimmy Flick | Decision (unanimous) (29–28, 29–28, 29–28) | 3 | 5:00 |
| Lightweight | Evan Elder | def. | Gauge Young | Decision (unanimous) (30–27, 30–27, 30–27) | 3 | 5:00 |
| Featherweight | Chris Gutiérrez | def. | John Castañeda | Decision (split) (28–29, 29–28, 29–28) | 3 | 5:00 |
| Bantamweight | Da'Mon Blackshear | def. | Alateng Heili | Decision (unanimous) (30–27, 30–27, 29–28) | 3 | 5:00 |
| Bantamweight | Malcolm Wellmaker | def. | Cameron Saaiman | KO (punch) | 1 | 1:59 |
| Women's Strawweight | Jaqueline Amorim | def. | Polyana Viana | Submission (rear-naked choke) | 2 | 1:49 |
| Featherweight | Timothy Cuamba | def. | Roberto Romero | TKO (flying knee) | 2 | 3:55 |
| Women's Bantamweight | Joselyne Edwards | def. | Chelsea Chandler | TKO (punches) | 1 | 2:31 |

== Bonus awards ==
The following fighters received $50,000 bonuses.

- Fight of the Night: Randy Brown vs. Nicolas Dalby
- Performance of the Night: Zhang Mingyang and Malcolm Wellmaker

== See also ==
- List of UFC events
- List of current UFC fighters
- 2025 in UFC
