= UFC on ESPN: Sandhagen vs. Figueiredo =

Mixed martial arts event in 2025

- The poster for UFC on ESPN: Sandhagen vs. Figueiredo
- Promotion: Ultimate Fighting Championship
- Date: May 3, 2025
- Venue: Wells Fargo Arena
- City: Des Moines, Iowa, United States
- Attendance: 15,627
- Total gate: $2,476,690

Event chronology
| UFC on ESPN: Machado Garry vs. Prates | UFC on ESPN: Sandhagen vs. Figueiredo | UFC 315: Muhammad vs. Della Maddalena |

UFC Fight Night: Sandhagen vs. Figueiredo (also known as UFC on ESPN 67) was a mixed martial arts event produced by the Ultimate Fighting Championship that took place on May 3, 2025 at the Wells Fargo Arena in Des Moines, Iowa, United States.

== Background ==
The event marked the promotion's debut in Des Moines and first visit to the state of Iowa since UFC 26 in June 2000.

A bantamweight bout between former interim UFC Bantamweight Championship challenger Cory Sandhagen and former two-time UFC Flyweight Champion Deiveson Figueiredo headlined the event.

A bantamweight bout between former title challenger Marlon Vera and Mario Bautista was scheduled for this event. However, the bout was moved to UFC 316 for unknown reasons.

A featherweight bout between Trevor Peek and Lee Jeong-yeong was scheduled for this event. However, Peek withdrew from the fight due to a fractured leg and the bout was subsequently cancelled as Lee was rescheduled against a different opponent at UFC 315.

Junior Tafa was expected to face Tuco Tokkos in a light heavyweight bout on the main card. However, Tafa pulled out in late April due to an injury. Subsequently, the promotion announced that Tokkos could not compete at this event due to injury as well. The bout was eventually rescheduled for UFC on ESPN: Lewis vs. Teixeira in July.

== Results ==
Main card (ESPN / ESPN+)
| Weight class | | | | Method | Round | Time | Notes |
|---|---|---|---|---|---|---|---|
| Bantamweight | Cory Sandhagen | def. | Deiveson Figueiredo | TKO (knee injury) | 2 | 4:08 |
| Middleweight | Reinier de Ridder | def. | Bo Nickal | TKO (knee to the body) | 2 | 1:53 |
| Welterweight | Daniel Rodriguez | def. | Santiago Ponzinibbio | TKO (punches) | 3 | 1:12 |
| Bantamweight | Montel Jackson | def. | Daniel Marcos | Decision (unanimous) (30–27, 30–27, 30–27) | 3 | 5:00 |
| Bantamweight | Serhiy Sidey | def. | Cameron Smotherman | Decision (unanimous) (30–27, 29–28, 29–28) | 3 | 5:00 |
| Lightweight | Mason Jones | def. | Jeremy Stephens | Decision (unanimous) (30–27, 30–27, 30–27) | 3 | 5:00 |
Preliminary card (ESPN / ESPN+)
| Women's Bantamweight | Yana Santos | def. | Miesha Tate | Decision (unanimous) (29–28, 29–28, 29–28) | 3 | 5:00 |
| Middleweight | Azamat Bekoev | def. | Ryan Loder | TKO (punches) | 1 | 2:44 |
| Women's Strawweight | Gillian Robertson | def. | Marina Rodriguez | TKO (punches) | 2 | 2:07 |
| Bantamweight | Quang Le | def. | Gastón Bolaños | Technical Submission (rear-naked choke) | 2 | 1:54 |
| Heavyweight | Thomas Petersen | def. | Don'Tale Mayes | Decision (unanimous) (30–25, 30–26, 30–26) | 3 | 5:00 |
| Women's Flyweight | Juliana Miller | def. | Ivana Petrović | Decision (unanimous) (29–28, 29–28, 29–28) | 3 | 5:00 |

== Bonus awards ==
The following fighters received $50,000 bonuses.

- Fight of the Night: No bonus awarded.
- Performance of the Night: Cory Sandhagen, Reinier de Ridder, Azamat Bekoev, and Quang Le

== See also ==
- List of UFC events
- List of current UFC fighters
- 2025 in UFC
