= UFC 315 =

2025 mixed martial event

UFC 315: Muhammad vs. Della Maddalena
- The poster for UFC 315: Muhammad vs. Della Maddalena
- Promotion: Ultimate Fighting Championship
- Date: May 10, 2025
- Venue: Bell Centre
- City: Montreal, Quebec, Canada
- Attendance: 19,786
- Total gate: $6,003,345

Event chronology
UFC on ESPN: Sandhagen vs. Figueiredo	UFC 315: Muhammad vs. Della Maddalena	UFC Fight Night: Burns vs. Morales

UFC 315: Muhammad vs. Della Maddalena was a mixed martial arts event produced by the Ultimate Fighting Championship that took place on May 10, 2025, at the Bell Centre in Montreal, Quebec, Canada.

== Background ==
The event marked the promotion's eighth visit to Montreal and first since UFC 186 in April 2015.

A UFC Welterweight Championship bout between current champion Belal Muhammad and Jack Della Maddalena headlined this event. Ian Machado Garry served as backup and potential replacement for this fight.

A UFC Women's Flyweight Championship bout between current two-time champion Valentina Shevchenko and Manon Fiorot took place in the co-main event.

A welterweight bout between former welterweight title challenger Gilbert Burns and Michael Morales was scheduled for UFC 314. However, the pairing was moved to this event due to undisclosed reasons. In turn, the bout was moved to UFC Fight Night: Burns vs. Morales to serve as the main event.

A women's bantamweight bout between Nora Cornolle and Hailey Cowan was expected to take place at this event. However, the bout was moved to UFC 314 for unknown reasons.

Gavin Tucker was expected to face Lee Jeong-yeong in a featherweight bout at the preliminary card. However, Tucker pulled out in late April due to undisclosed reasons and was replaced by Daniel Santos.

A lightweight bout between Benoît Saint Denis and Joel Álvarez was scheduled for this event. However, Álvarez withdrew from the fight due to a hand injury and was replaced by returning veteran Kyle Prepolec.

Originally scheduled as a bantamweight bout, the fight between former two-time UFC Featherweight Champion and UFC Hall of Famer (also former WEC Featherweight Champion) José Aldo and Aiemann Zahabi was moved to featherweight on the day of the weigh-ins, with Aldo weighing in at 143 pounds and Zahabi at 142 pounds. After the official weigh-ins, Zahabi disclosed that his team was told Aldo's weight cut was going to be a problem and said he was just under 137 pounds at the time. Had he made weight, Aldo's weight discrepancy would have meant an automatic cancellation of the bout. Instead, Zahabi stopped his weight cut and had to rehydrate for a fight at featherweight so he could be close enough to Aldo's missed weight to avoid the fight being scrapped entirely.

In addition, at the weigh-ins, Bruno Silva weighed in at 187 pounds, a pound over the weight non-title fight limit. The bout proceeded at catchweight and Silva was fined 20 percent of his purse which went to his opponent Marc-André Barriault.

During the event's broadcast, former UFC Light Heavyweight Champion and UFC 12 Heavyweight Tournament winner Vitor Belfort was announced as the next "pioneer wing" UFC Hall of Fame inductee during International Fight Week festivities in Las Vegas this June.

== Results ==
Main card
Weight class				Method	Round	Time	Notes
Welterweight	Jack Della Maddalena	def.	Belal Muhammad (c)	Decision (unanimous) (48–47, 48–47, 49–46)	5	5:00	(Note: For the UFC Welterweight Championship.)
Women's Flyweight	Valentina Shevchenko (c)	def.	Manon Fiorot	Decision (unanimous) (48–47, 48–47, 48–47)	5	5:00	(Note: For the UFC Women's Flyweight Championship.)
Featherweight	Aiemann Zahabi	def.	José Aldo	Decision (unanimous) (29–28, 29–28, 29–28)	3	5:00
Women's Flyweight	Natália Silva	def.	Alexa Grasso	Decision (unanimous) (30–27, 30–27, 30–27)	3	5:00
Lightweight	Benoît Saint Denis	def.	Kyle Prepolec	Submission (arm-triangle choke)	2	2:35
Preliminary card (ESPN / ESPN+ / Disney+)
Welterweight	Mike Malott	def.	Charles Radtke	KO (punches)	2	0:26
Women's Flyweight	Jasmine Jasudavicius	def.	Jéssica Andrade	Submission (rear-naked choke)	1	2:40
Light Heavyweight	Modestas Bukauskas	def.	Ion Cuțelaba	Decision (split) (27–30, 30–27, 29–28)	3	5:00
Light Heavyweight	Navajo Stirling	def.	Ivan Erslan	Decision (unanimous) (29–28, 29–28, 29–27)	3	5:00
Early preliminary card (ESPN+ / Disney+ / UFC Fight Pass)
Catchweight (187 lb)	Marc-André Barriault	def.	Bruno Silva	KO (elbows and punches)	1	1:27
Featherweight	Daniel Santos	def.	Lee Jeong-yeong	Decision (unanimous) (30–27, 30–27, 30–27)	3	5:00
Bantamweight	Bekzat Almakhan	def.	Brad Katona	KO (punches)	1	1:04

== Bonus awards ==
The following fighters received $50,000 bonuses.

- Fight of the Night: Jack Della Maddalena vs. Belal Muhammad
- Performance of the Night: Jasmine Jasudavicius and Marc-André Barriault

== See also ==
- 2025 in UFC
- List of current UFC fighters
- List of UFC events
