= Johnny Muñoz Jr. =

American mixed martial arts fighter

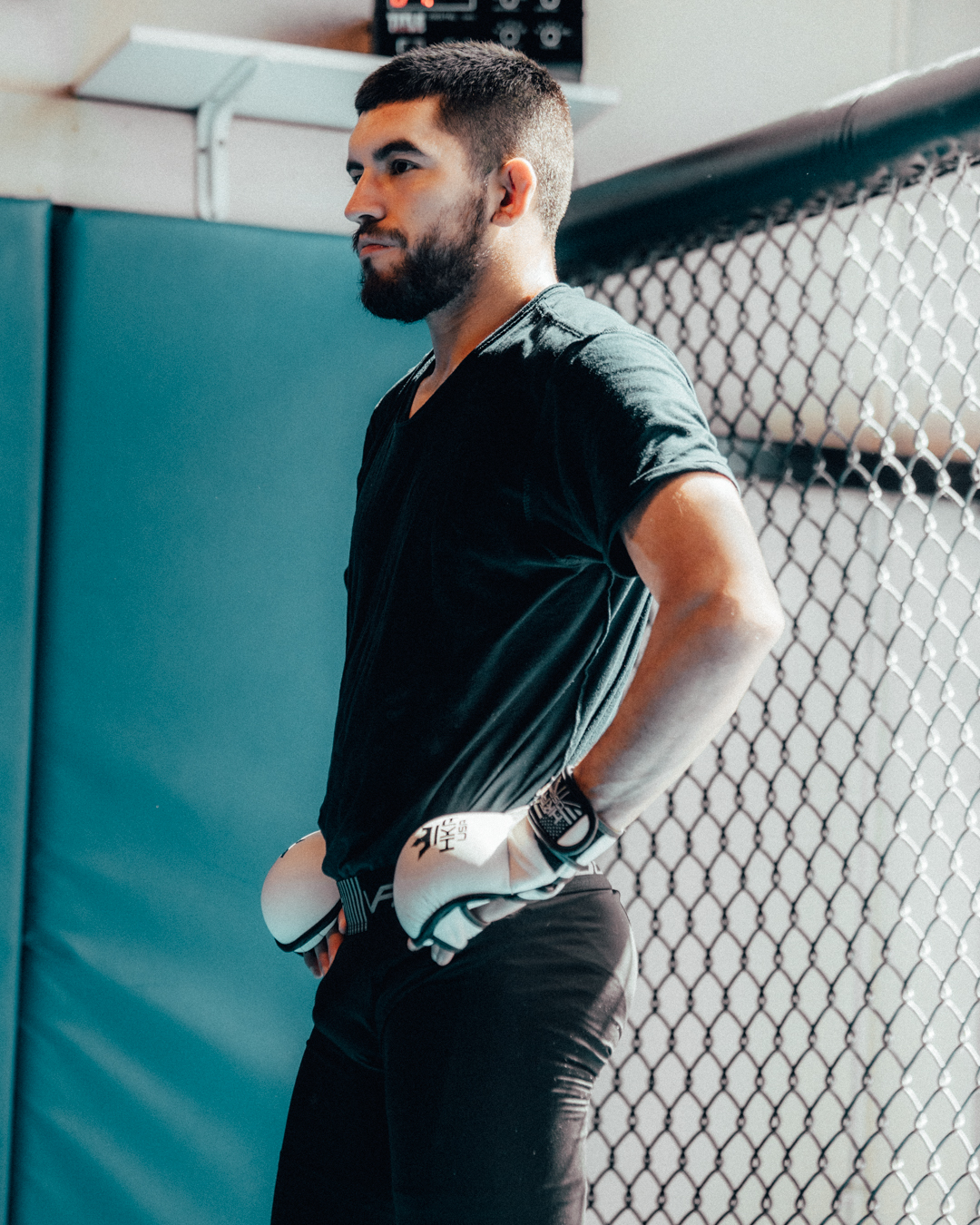
- Johnny Muñoz in 2021
- Born: February 16, 1993 (age 33); Corona, California, U.S.
- Other names: Kid Kvenbo
- Nationality: American / Mexican
- Height: 5 ft 9 in (1.75 m)
- Weight: 135 lb (61 kg; 9 st 9 lb)
- Division: Featherweight; Bantamweight
- Reach: 72.0 in (183 cm)
- Fighting out of: Norco, California, U.S. Tijuana, Baja California, Mexico
- Team: CQuence Jiu-Jitsu & MMA; Entram Gym (2021-2024)
- Rank: 3rd degree black belt in Brazilian Jiu-Jitsu under John Muñoz
- Years active: 2014–present (MMA)

Mixed martial arts record
- Total: 20
- Wins: 15
- By knockout: 2
- By submission: 7
- By decision: 6
- Losses: 4
- By knockout: 1
- By decision: 3
- Draws: 1

Other information
- Mixed martial arts record from Sherdog

Johnny Muñoz Jr (born February 16, 1993) is an American and Mexican mixed martial artist who competes in the Bantamweight division. A professional since 2015, he is most notable for his stint in the Ultimate Fighting Championship.

== Background ==
With his parents founding the BJJ school C-Quence Jiu Jitsu in Norco, California, Muñoz started training at five years old, having to train at least two times a week, eventually earning his black belt in BJJ from his mother and father at the age of 20.

In addition to being a fighter, Muñoz went to college and received his master's degree in 2020.

== Mixed martial arts career ==
=== Early career ===
Muñoz began his amateur MMA career in 2014 after competing across various BJJ organizations, compiling a 3–0 record, finishing all his bouts in the first round. After going pro the next year, Muñoz captured his biggest title in Jiu Jitsu in 2016, winning the SJJIF World Jiu-Jitsu Championship title in his weight class. Muñoz would spend his whole pro career before the UFC with King of the Cage, going 9–0 and winning the KOTC Bantamweight Championship against Rentsen Otgontulga.

=== Ultimate Fighting Championship ===
Muñoz, as a replacement for Ray Borg, faced Nate Maness on August 1, 2020, at UFC Fight Night: Brunson vs. Shahbazyan. He lost the close bout via unanimous decision. 5 out of 15 media scores gave it to Muñoz, 6 out of 10 gave it to Maness, and 4 scored it a draw.

In his sophomore performance, Muñoz bounced back from his lost, defeating Jamey Simmons by the way of unanimous decision on August 7, 2021, at UFC 265.

Muñoz faced Tony Gravely on June 4, 2022, at UFC Fight Night: Volkov vs. Rozenstruik. He lost the bout in the first round after getting knocked down after running into an uppercut on a takedown attempt.

Muñoz faced Liudvik Sholinian on November 5, 2022, at UFC Fight Night 214. He won the bout via unanimous decision.

Muñoz was scheduled to face Daniel Santos on May 6, 2023, at UFC 288. However, the bout was scratched after Santos withdrew due to an undisclosed injury. The pair was rescheduled to meet on June 3, 2023, at UFC on ESPN 46. Muñoz lost the fight via split decision.

Muñoz faced Aori Qileng on October 7, 2023, at UFC Fight Night 229. He lost the fight via unanimous decision.

On December 12, 2023, it was announced that Muñoz was no longer on the UFC roster.

== Championships and accomplishments ==
- King of the Cage
  - KOTC Bantamweight Championship (One time)

== Mixed martial arts record ==
Professional record breakdown
20 matches	15 wins	4 losses
By knockout	2	1
By submission	7	0
By decision	6	3
Draws	1	

Res.	Record	Opponent	Method	Event	Date	Round	Time	Location	Notes
Draw	15–4–1	Yovanis Decroz	Draw (majority)	UWC Mexico 59	August 30, 2026	3	5:00	Tijuana, Mexico	
Win	15–4	Alfredo Larios	Decision (unanimous)	UWC Mexico 57	March 22, 2026	3	5:00	Tijuana, Mexico	
Win	14–4	Luis Duvan Rincón	Decision (unanimous)	UWC Mexico 56	April 6, 2025	3	5:00	Tijuana, Mexico	
Win	13–4	Juan Pablo Mendoza	Decision (unanimous)	UWC Mexico 54	July 28, 2024	3	5:00	Tijuana, Mexico	
Loss	12–4	Aori Qileng	Decision (unanimous)	UFC Fight Night: Dawson vs. Green	October 7, 2023	3	5:00	Las Vegas, Nevada, United States	
Loss	12–3	Daniel Santos	Decision (unanimous)	UFC on ESPN: Kara-France vs. Albazi	June 3, 2023	3	5:00	Las Vegas, Nevada, United States	Santos was deducted one point in round 3 due to a groin strike.
Win	12–2	Liudvik Sholinian	Decision (unanimous)	UFC Fight Night: Rodriguez vs. Lemos	November 5, 2022	3	5:00	Las Vegas, Nevada, United States	
Loss	11–2	Tony Gravely	KO (punches)	UFC Fight Night: Volkov vs. Rozenstruik	June 4, 2022	1	1:08	Las Vegas, Nevada, United States	
Win	11–1	Jamey Simmons	Submission (rear-naked choke)	UFC 265	August 7, 2021	2	2:35	Houston, Texas, United States	Return to Bantamweight.
Loss	10–1	Nate Maness	Decision (unanimous)	UFC Fight Night: Brunson vs. Shahbazyan	August 1, 2020	3	5:00	Las Vegas, Nevada, United States	
Win	10–0	Ian King	Submission (rear-naked choke)	KOTC: Reaction Time	September 7, 2019	2	3:33	Parker, Arizona, United States	Featherweight debut.
Win	9–0	Rentsen Otgontulga	Decision (unanimous)	KOTC: Golden Era	June 22, 2019	5	5:00	Ontario, California, United States	Won the KOTC Bantamweight Championship.
Win	8–0	Uriel Cossio Dominguez	Submission (rear-naked choke)	KOTC: Full Speed	September 28, 2018	2	1:59	Alpine, California, United States	
Win	7–0	Anthony Zender	KO	KOTC: Grand Finale	May 26, 2018	1	0:38	Lincoln City, Oregon, United States	
Win	6–0	Mauricio Diaz	Submission (heel hook)	KOTC: Energetic Pursuit	February 24, 2018	1	2:14	Ontario, California, United States	
Win	5–0	Zane Douglas	Submission (rear-naked choke)	KOTC: Never Quit	September 2, 2017	1	1:37	Ontario, California, United States	
Win	4–0	Musa Toliver	Submission (armbar)	KOTC: Supernova	March 18, 2017	1	3:23	Ontario, California, United States	
Win	3–0	Gor Mnatsakanyan	TKO (punches)	KOTC: Martial Law	September 18, 2016	1	4:39	Ontario, California, United States	
Win	2–0	Carlos Galvan	Decision (unanimous)	KOTC: Sinister Intentions	October 17, 2015	3	5:00	Las Vegas, Nevada, United States	
Win	1–0	Jesus Rivas	Submission (armbar)	KOTC: Bitter Rivals	August 29, 2015	1	1:43	Ontario, California, United States	Bantamweight debut.

== See also ==
- List of male mixed martial artists
