= UFC on ESPN: Kara-France vs. Albazi =

Mixed martial arts event in 2023

- The poster for UFC on ESPN: Kara-France vs. Albazi
- Promotion: Ultimate Fighting Championship
- Date: June 3, 2023
- Venue: UFC Apex
- City: Enterprise, Nevada United States
- Attendance: Not announced

Event chronology
UFC Fight Night: Dern vs. Hill	UFC on ESPN: Kara-France vs. Albazi	UFC 289: Nunes vs. Aldana

UFC on ESPN: Kara-France vs. Albazi (also known as UFC on ESPN 46 or UFC Vegas 74) was a mixed martial arts event produced by the Ultimate Fighting Championship that took place on June 3, 2023, at the UFC Apex facility in Enterprise, Nevada, part of the Las Vegas Metropolitan Area, United States.

== Background ==
A middleweight bout between Jack Hermansson and former LFA Middleweight Champion Brendan Allen was expected to headline the event. However, Hermansson withdrew in late April due to an undisclosed injury and the bout was scratched. Allen was eventually rescheduled against Bruno Silva at UFC on ABC: Emmett vs. Topuria on June 25. As a result, a scheduled flyweight bout between former interim UFC Flyweight Championship challenger Kai Kara-France and Amir Albazi was promoted to main event status.

Former UFC Flyweight Championship challenger (also The Ultimate Fighter: Tournament of Champions flyweight winner) Tim Elliott and Allan Nascimento were expected to meet in a flyweight bout at the event. However on April 28, Nascimento pulled out due to undisclosed reasons and was replaced by former LFA Flyweight Champion Victor Altamirano.

Former Strikeforce and UFC Women's Bantamweight Champion Miesha Tate was expected to face Mayra Bueno Silva in a women's bantamweight contest. However on May 10, it was announced that Tate suffered an undisclosed injury and Bueno Silva was moved to headline UFC Fight Night: Holm vs. Bueno Silva against another former champion in Holly Holm.

A featherweight bout between David Onama and Khusein Askhabov was expected to take place at this event. However, Askhabov withdrew for unknown reasons. Onama was instead rescheduled to face Gabriel Santos at UFC on ABC: Emmett vs. Topuria.

Jim Miller and Ľudovít Klein were expected to meet in a lightweight bout. However, Klein pulled out on May 19 due to illness and was replaced by Jared Gordon. In turn, Gordon was pulled from the bout on the week of the event after not being medically cleared and was replaced by promotional newcomer Jesse Butler.

A lightweight bout between Jamie Mullarkey and Guram Kutateladze was scheduled for this event. However, Kutateladze withdrew from the bout due to visa issues and was replaced by Muhammad Naimov.

A bantamweight bout between John Castañeda and Mateus Mendonça was scheduled to take place at this event. However, Mendonça withdrew from the bout citing an injury and was replaced by Muin Gafurov.

== Results ==
Main Card (ESPN / ESPN+)
Weight class				Method	Round	Time	Notes
Flyweight	Amir Albazi	def.	Kai Kara-France	Decision (split) (47–48, 48–47, 48–47)	5	5:00
Featherweight	Alex Caceres	def.	Daniel Pineda	Decision (unanimous) (29–28, 29–28, 29–28)	3	5:00
Lightweight	Jim Miller	def.	Jesse Butler	KO (punch)	1	0:23
Flyweight	Tim Elliott	def.	Victor Altamirano	Decision (unanimous) (30–27, 30–27, 29–28)	3	5:00
Women's Flyweight	Karine Silva	def.	Ketlen Souza	Submission (kneebar)	1	1:45
Welterweight	Elizeu Zaleski dos Santos	def.	Abubakar Nurmagomedov	Decision (split) (28–29, 29–28, 29–28)	3	5:00
Preliminary card (ESPN / ESPN+)
Bantamweight	Daniel Santos	def.	Johnny Muñoz Jr.	Decision (unanimous) (29–27, 29–27, 29–27)	3	5:00	(Note: Santos was deducted 1 point in round 3 due to a groin strike.)
Heavyweight	Don'Tale Mayes	def.	Andrei Arlovski	TKO (punches)	2	3:17
Bantamweight	John Castañeda	def.	Muin Gafurov	Decision (unanimous) (29–27, 29–27, 29–27)	3	5:00	(Note: Gafurov was deducted 1 point in round 2 due to repeatedly leading with the head.)
Lightweight	Muhammad Naimov	def.	Jamie Mullarkey	TKO (punches)	2	2:59
Women's Strawweight	Elise Reed	def.	Jinh Yu Frey	Decision (unanimous) (29–28, 29–28, 29–28)	3	5:00
Bantamweight	Da'Mon Blackshear	def.	Luan Lacerda	TKO (punches)	2	3:54
Light Heavyweight	Philipe Lins	def.	Maxim Grishin	Decision (unanimous) (29–28, 29–28, 30–27)	3	5:00

== Bonus awards ==
The following fighters received $50,000 bonuses.

- Fight of the Night: Alex Caceres vs. Daniel Pineda
- Performance of the Night: Jim Miller and Muhammad Naimov

== See also ==
- List of UFC events
- List of current UFC fighters
- 2023 in UFC
