= UFC Fight Night: Ulberg vs. Reyes =

Mixed martial arts event in 2025

- The poster for UFC Fight Night: Ulberg vs. Reyes
- Promotion: Ultimate Fighting Championship
- Date: 28 September 2025
- Venue: RAC Arena
- City: Perth, Australia
- Attendance: 12,543
- Total gate: $1,800,000

Event chronology
UFC Fight Night: Lopes vs. Silva	UFC Fight Night: Ulberg vs. Reyes	UFC 320: Ankalaev vs. Pereira 2

UFC Fight Night: Ulberg vs. Reyes (also known as UFC Fight Night 260 and UFC on ESPN+ 118) was a mixed martial arts event produced by the Ultimate Fighting Championship that took place on 28 September 2025, at the RAC Arena in Perth, Australia.

== Background ==
This event marked the promotion's fourth visit to Perth and its first-ever Fight Night, following UFC 305 in August 2024.

A light heavyweight bout between Carlos Ulberg and former UFC Light Heavyweight Championship challenger Dominick Reyes headlined this event. The pairing was initially scheduled for UFC 297 in January 2024, but was cancelled due to an injury sustained by Ulberg. It was later rebooked for UFC on ESPN: Blanchfield vs. Fiorot in March 2024; however, Reyes withdrew from the bout due to deep vein thrombosis.

A featherweight bout between Choi Doo-ho and Daniel Santos was scheduled for this event. However, Choi withdrew from the fight for unknown reasons and was replaced by Yoo Joo-sang. In turn, the pairing was moved to UFC 320 due to undisclosed reasons.

Tom Nolan and Evan Elder were expected to meet in a lightweight bout at the event. However, Elder pulled out and was replaced by Charlie Campbell.

A light heavyweight bout between Junior Tafa and İbo Aslan was scheduled for this event. However, the bout was canceled after Tafa sustained an injury.

Oban Elliott was expected to meet Jonathan Micallef in a welterweight bout on the preliminary card, but the pairing was cancelled less than 48 hours before the event as Elliott pulled out due to illness.

At the weigh-ins, Ramon Taveras weighed in at 147 pounds, one pound over the featherweight non-title fight limit. The bout proceeded at catchweight and he was fined a percentage of his purse, which went to his opponent Jack Jenkins. In addition, the heavyweight fight between Justin Tafa and Louie Sutherland was removed from the event due to Tafa suffering an illness.

== Results ==
Main card (ESPN+)
Weight class				Method	Round	Time	Notes
Light Heavyweight	Carlos Ulberg	def.	Dominick Reyes	KO (punches)	1	4:27
Light Heavyweight	Jimmy Crute	def.	Ivan Erslan	Submission (reverse can opener)	1	3:19
Catchweight (147 lb)	Jack Jenkins	def.	Ramon Taveras	Decision (unanimous) (30–27, 30–27, 29–28)	3	5:00
Welterweight	Neil Magny	def.	Jake Matthews	Submission (brabo choke)	3	3:08
Lightweight	Tom Nolan	def.	Charlie Campbell	Submission (rear-naked choke)	1	4:08
Preliminary card (ESPN+)
Light Heavyweight	Navajo Stirling	def.	Rodolfo Bellato	Decision (unanimous) (30–27, 30–27, 29–28)	3	5:00
Middleweight	Cameron Rowston	def.	Andre Petroski	TKO (punches)	1	2:41
Lightweight	Jamie Mullarkey	def.	Rolando Bedoya	Decision (unanimous) (29–28, 29–28, 29–28)	3	5:00
Bantamweight	Colby Thicknesse	def.	Josias Musasa	Decision (unanimous) (29–28, 29–28, 29–28)	3	5:00
Women's Bantamweight	Michelle Montague	def.	Luana Carolina	Decision (unanimous) (29–26, 30–25, 30–26)	3	5:00	(Note: Carolina was deducted one point in round 2 due to an illegal upkick.)
Heavyweight	Brando Peričić	def.	Elisha Ellison	KO (punches)	1	1:55
Women's Strawweight	Alexia Thainara	def.	Loma Lookboonmee	Decision (unanimous) (30–27, 30–27, 30–27)	3	5:00

== Bonus awards ==
The following fighters received $50,000 bonuses.

- Fight of the Night: No bonus awarded.
- Performance of the Night: Carlos Ulberg, Jimmy Crute, Tom Nolan, and Brando Peričić

== See also ==
- 2025 in UFC
- List of current UFC fighters
- List of UFC events
