= UFC 273 =

Mixed martial arts event in 2022

UFC 273: Volkanovski vs. The Korean Zombie
- The poster for UFC 273: Volkanovski vs. The Korean Zombie
- Promotion: Ultimate Fighting Championship
- Date: April 9, 2022
- Venue: VyStar Veterans Memorial Arena
- City: Jacksonville, Florida, United States
- Attendance: 14,605
- Total gate: $3,550,053.07

Event chronology
UFC on ESPN: Blaydes vs. Daukaus	UFC 273: Volkanovski vs. The Korean Zombie	UFC on ESPN: Luque vs. Muhammad 2

UFC 273: Volkanovski vs. The Korean Zombie was a mixed martial arts event produced by the Ultimate Fighting Championship that took place on April 9, 2022, at VyStar Veterans Memorial Arena in Jacksonville, Florida, United States.

== Background ==
This event was initially linked to the Barclays Center in Brooklyn, New York. However, the promotion opted to move it to VyStar Veterans Memorial Arena in Jacksonville, Florida.

A UFC Featherweight Championship bout between current champion Alexander Volkanovski and former title challenger Chan Sung Jung headlined the event.

A UFC Bantamweight Championship title unification rematch between current champion Aljamain Sterling and former champion/current interim title holder Petr Yan took place at this event. The pairing previously met at UFC 259, with Sterling winning the title by disqualification (intentional illegal knee strike) in the fourth round, becoming the first fighter to win a UFC title by disqualification. The rematch was initially expected to take place at UFC 267, however Sterling withdrew from the contest due to lingering neck issues and an interim title bout between Yan and Cory Sandhagen was set. The bout was then scheduled for UFC 272 before being moved to this event.

A heavyweight bout between Jairzinho Rozenstruik and Marcin Tybura was initially scheduled for UFC Fight Night: Makhachev vs. Green. However, in mid January it was announced the bout was moved to this card. In turn, the bout was pulled from the card after Tybura withdrew due to an undisclosed illness.

2016 Olympic silver medalist in wrestling Mark Madsen and Vinc Pichel were expected to meet in a lightweight bout at UFC 271, but they were pushed back to this event due to undisclosed reasons.

A trio of middleweight bouts featuring former interim UFC Middleweight Championship challenger and The Ultimate Fighter: Team Jones vs. Team Sonnen middleweight winner Kelvin Gastelum vs. Nassourdine Imavov, Dricus du Plessis vs. Chris Curtis, and Anthony Hernandez vs. Albert Duraev were expected to take place at the event. Initially, du Plessis and Hernandez were instead matched up after Curtis and Duraev withdrew due to a wrist and rib injury, respectively. However, the bouts were yet again shuffled after Imavov pulled out of the fight vs. Gastelum due to alleged visa issues which restricted his travel. Gastelum vs. du Plessis and Hernandez vs. Josh Fremd were then set. However, Gastelum withdrew a week before the event due to an undisclosed injury and his bout with du Plessis was cancelled.

A women's bantamweight bout between Aspen Ladd and Irene Aldana was expected to take place at the event. However, Aldana withdrew in late March for undisclosed reasons and was replaced by former UFC Women's Bantamweight Championship challenger Raquel Pennington.

A heavyweight bout between Aleksei Oleinik and Ilir Latifi was expected to take place at the event. They were originally scheduled to meet 2 weeks prior at UFC on ESPN: Blaydes vs. Daukaus but Latifi withdrew the day of the event due to illness. In turn, Latifi withdrew again for undisclosed reasons and was replaced by Jared Vanderaa.

At the weigh-ins, Kay Hansen and Julio Arce missed weight for their bouts. Hansen weighed in at 118.5 pounds, 2.5 pounds over the strawweight non-title fight limit. Arce weighed in at 136.5 pounds, half a pound over the bantamweight non-title fight limit. Both of their bouts proceeded at a catchweight and they forfeited 20% of their individual purses which went to their opponents Piera Rodríguez and Daniel Santos.

== Results ==
Main card
Weight class				Method	Round	Time	Notes
Featherweight	Alexander Volkanovski (c)	def.	Chan Sung Jung	TKO (punches)	4	0:45	(Note: For the UFC Featherweight Championship.)
Bantamweight	Aljamain Sterling (c)	def.	Petr Yan (ic)	Decision (split) (48–47, 47–48, 48–47)	5	5:00	(Note: For the UFC Bantamweight Championship.)
Welterweight	Khamzat Chimaev	def.	Gilbert Burns	Decision (unanimous) (29–28, 29–28, 29–28)	3	5:00
Women's Strawweight	Mackenzie Dern	def.	Tecia Torres	Decision (split) (28–29, 29–28, 29–28)	3	5:00
Lightweight	Mark Madsen	def.	Vinc Pichel	Decision (unanimous) (30–27, 30–27, 29–28)	3	5:00
Preliminary card (ESPN / ESPN+)
Welterweight	Ian Machado Garry	def.	Darian Weeks	Decision (unanimous) (29–28, 30–27, 30–27)	3	5:00
Middleweight	Anthony Hernandez	def.	Josh Fremd	Decision (unanimous) (30–27, 30–27, 29–28)	3	5:00
Women's Bantamweight	Raquel Pennington	def.	Aspen Ladd	Decision (unanimous) (29–28, 29–28, 29–28)	3	5:00
Welterweight	Mike Malott	def.	Mickey Gall	TKO (punches)	1	3:41
Early preliminary card (ESPN+ / UFC Fight Pass)
Heavyweight	Aleksei Oleinik	def.	Jared Vanderaa	Submission (scarf hold)	1	3:39
Catchweight (118.5 lb)	Piera Rodríguez	def.	Kay Hansen	Decision (unanimous) (29–28, 29–28, 29–28)	3	5:00
Catchweight (136.5 lb)	Julio Arce	def.	Daniel Santos	Decision (unanimous) (30–27, 30–27, 29–28)	3	5:00

== Bonus awards ==
The following fighters received $50,000 bonuses.

- Fight of the Night: Khamzat Chimaev vs. Gilbert Burns
- Performance of the Night: Alexander Volkanovski and Alexey Oleynik

While the UFC usually gives out four bonus awards for each event, three "Fan Bonus of the Night" will be awarded by Crypto.com, as part of their UFC sponsorship incentive fight kits deal, for every pay-per-view event starting with UFC 273. Viewers could vote up to three times per pay-per-view on Crypto.com/FanBonus, starting from the opening of the PPV preliminary card and ending an hour after the conclusion of the main card. The bonuses are paid in bitcoin in US dollars ranging from US$30,000 for first place, US$20,000 for second place, and US$10,000 for third place. The winners of the inaugural awards were:

- First Place: Khamzat Chimaev
- Second Place: Alexander Volkanovski
- Third Place: Petr Yan

== See also ==
- List of UFC events
- List of current UFC fighters
- 2022 in UFC
