= Gerald Meerschaert =

American former mixed martial artist (born 1987)

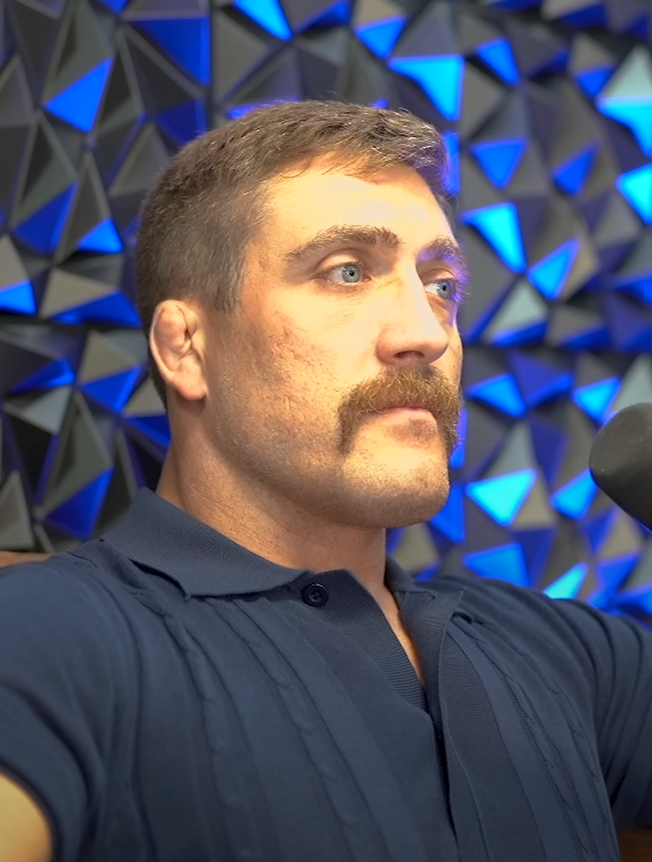
- Meerschaert in 2024
- Born: Gerald Edward Meerschaert III; December 18, 1987 (age 38); Racine, Wisconsin, U.S.
- Other names: GM3; Meerkat
- Height: 6 ft 1 in (1.85 m)
- Weight: 185 lb (84 kg; 13.2 st)
- Division: Light Heavyweight; Middleweight; Welterweight
- Reach: 77 in (196 cm)
- Stance: Southpaw
- Fighting out of: Milwaukee, Wisconsin, U.S.
- Team: Kill Cliff FC; Roufusport; Agallar Combative Systems
- Teacher: Duke Roufus
- Rank: Black belt in Roufusport kickboxing Black belt in Brazilian jiu-jitsu
- Years active: 2007–2026

Mixed martial arts record
- Total: 60
- Wins: 37
- By knockout: 6
- By submission: 29
- By decision: 2
- Losses: 23
- By knockout: 6
- By submission: 10
- By decision: 7

Other information
- Mixed martial arts record from Sherdog

Gerald Edward Meerschaert III (born December 18, 1987), also known by his initials GM3, is an American former professional mixed martial artist who competed in the Middleweight division of the Ultimate Fighting Championship (UFC), where he held the record for most finishes in middleweight history with 12. A professional from 2007 to 2026, he also competed for the Resurrection Fighting Alliance (RFA), Titan FC, and King of the Cage (KOTC).

== Background ==
Meerschaert was born in Racine, Wisconsin, United States. He trained in Taekwondo when he was young. He began playing alto saxophone in the fifth grade and through his years at Walden III Middle and High School. Meerschaert later studied music education in college, hoping to become a music teacher, before deciding to make MMA his career after watching some local MMA and UFC fights on TV. Meerschaert began training in MMA at the age of 19.

== Mixed martial arts career ==
=== Early career ===
After a 1–0 amateur career, Meerschaert fought most of his fights in his native state of Wisconsin, from 2007 to 2011. He started traveling to nearby states to compete after 2012. Prior to joining the UFC, he was an active fighter with a record of 25–8.

Meerschaert began his professional MMA career in March 2007, fighting at Freestyle Combat Challenge 26 on March 10, after just one month of training. He lost his first fight to Jay Ellis via a technical submission. Two months after his first loss, he bounced back to snap a win via kimura. His third MMA fight came one week later on May 19, 2007, against Will Pace. He won the fight via rear-naked choke in round one.

On January 12, 2008, Meerschaert faced Kenneth Allen and won via triangle choke in round one. Five weeks later, Meerschaert stepped in the cage and competed against Caleb Krull. He won the fight via unanimous decision (29–28, 29–28, 29–27). Meerschaert was back to the cage again four weeks later vs. Alex Carter. Meerschaert won the fight via triangle choke in round two. His last fight in Freestyle Combat was on May 3, 2008, vs. Ryan Scheeper. Meerschaert won via armbar in the first round.

Meerschaert fought Mike Vaughn July 25, 2008. Meerschaert won via first round rear-naked choke.

Meerschaert fought Curtis Bailey October 10, 2008. The fight was held in Madison, Wisconsin on Madtown Throwdown 17. The fight was five rounds, and Meerschaert lost the fight via guillotine choke in round two.

After a busy year in 2009, Meerschaert did not set foot on the cage to compete until May 2, 2009. He fought Kenny Robertson on Madtown Throwdown 19 and lost via a kneebar submission on round one.

He started off by fighting on Gladiators Cage Fighting: Fair Warning on August 15, 2009, his opponent was Jacob Kuester and Meerschaert managed to overpower Kuester and submitted him via a neck crank. On the next fight, Meerschaert face-off Morrison Lamb on Racine Fight Night 5 on November 28, 2009, in his hometown, Racine, Wisconsin. It was a short fight where Meerschaert submitted Lamb via a guillotine choke on round one.

Meerschaert faced Eddie Larrea at Extreme Cagefigting Organisation 4 on March 20, 2010. Meerschaert secured the win via an arm-triangle choke. April 17, 2010, Meerschaert fought in Combat USA 19. Meerschaert punched his way through and knocked out Jim Klimczyk and snatched the win.

His last competition in 2010 was on September 11. He took on Sam Alvey, with a record of 11–1–0, ranking number 1 in Wisconsin in the middleweight division. They competed on Combat USA: Championship Tournament Finals for a five-round title middleweight fight. On the early rounds, Meerschaert attempted multiple takedowns but Alvey managed to stop most of them; however, Meerschaert managed to put Alvey on a guillotine choke on round 5 and secured the win to reign Wisconsin State middleweight 2010 champion.

With the record of 14–4–0, Meerschaert started off his 2011 competition on January 6, facing Dallas O'Malley on Combat USA 24. He won the fight via guillotine choke on round two.

The next fight came 3 months later where Meerschaert took on Herbert Goodman, the former Green Bay Packers football player, defending his Wisconsin Middleweight title on Combat USA: Wisconsin State Finals. Meerscheart lost the fight via a rear-naked choke on round one when he was taken down by Goodman after failing to hit Goodman with his left overhand, giving his back to Goodman where Goodman managed to sink a rear-naked choke.

Six months later, Meerschaert went on to join the Rogue Warrior Championship 3 competition on the welterweight fight on September 6, 2011. He faced Eddie Larrea and won the fight via a rear-naked choke on round one.

Meerschaert did not return to the cage after he lost to Goodman until about one the half-year later when he went on to join the Rogue Warrior Championship 3 competition on the welterweight fight on September 6, 2011. He faced Eddie Larrea and won the fight via a rear-naked choke on round one. The second and also the last fight Meerschaert take on for 2012 was on October 19. He was up against Sergej Juskevic at Score Fighting Series. He lost the fight on round two via kneebar submission.

On January 19, 2013, he took on Anthony Lapsley on a catchweight bout (175 Ib) on Rocktagon MMA Elite Series 23. He lost the fight on round one via rear-naked choke. He next faced Jay Ellis on King of the Cage: Certified on April 20, 2013, a catchweight bout (180 Ib). He bounced back from the last two defeat and captured the win with TKO (punches) in round one. Meerschaert went to Duluth, Georgia, to compete on National Fighting Championships 58 on July 19, 2013. The fight was a 180 Ib catchweight bout. The judges awarded him with the win after three battle against George Lockhart. On September 13, 2013, Meerschaert fought with Nathan Gunn in another catchweight fight. He managed to submit Gunn on round two with a guillotine choke on Canadian Fighting Championship 8 event.

Meerschaert moved up to Middleweight (185 Ibs) in 2014 and competed in North American Fighting Championship in two fights. First, he faced Eddie Larrea which he secured a win via arm-triangle choke and moved on to fight Sam Alvey on their second meet up and this time he lost by unanimous decision on judges' scorecards. His last fight in 2014 was in September where he fought in KOTC: Magnum Force against Matt Lagou. He came out with a win via a TKO (doctor stoppage).

Meerschaert aced Keith Smetana at 4BC: Capital City Punishment in June 2015. He won a quick win via TKO in round one. His next and last fight in 2015 came one month later and won via another TKO (doctor stoppage) against Lucas Rota.

Meerschaert started his first fight in 2016 by moving up to Light Heavyweight division (205 Ibs). He fought at Valor Fight 36 and his opponent was Sidney Wheeler. He threatened Wheeler with a kimura and forced him to tap out on round one. His last fight before joining UFC was in October 2016, facing Chase Waldon in Resurrection Fighting Alliance (RFA) in Middleweight bout. He earned the victory via submission (arm-triangle choke) on round one, earning him the RFA middleweight title.

=== Ultimate Fighting Championship ===
==== 2016 ====
Meerschaert made his promotional debut on December 9, 2016, at UFC Fight Night: Lewis vs. Abdurakhimov, replacing injured Oluwale Bamgbose, against Joe Gigliotti. He won the fight via anaconda choke submission in round one. His performance earned him a Performance of the Night bonus award.

==== 2017 ====
Meerschaert faced Ryan Janes on February 19, 2017, at UFC Fight Night: Lewis vs. Browne. He won the fight via submission in the first round.

Meerschaert faced Thiago Santos on July 8, 2017, at UFC 213. He lost the fight via TKO in the second round.

Meerschaert fought Eric Spicely on December 1, 2017, at The Ultimate Fighter 26 Finale. He won the bout via TKO in the second round. This win earned him a Performance of the Night bonus.

==== 2018 ====
Meerschaert faced Oskar Piechota on July 6, 2018, at The Ultimate Fighter 27 Finale. He won the fight via technical submission due to a rear-naked choke in the second round.

Meerschaert faced Jack Hermansson on December 15, 2018, at UFC on Fox 31. He lost the fight via guillotine choke submission in the first round.

==== 2019 ====
Meerschaert faced Kevin Holland on March 30, 2019, at UFC on ESPN 2. He lost the fight via split decision.

Meerschaert faced Trevin Giles on August 3, 2019, at UFC on ESPN 5. He won the fight via technical submission in the third round due to a guillotine choke.

Meerschaert faced Eryk Anders on October 12, 2019, at UFC Fight Night 161. He lost the fight by split decision.

==== 2020 ====
Meerschaert faced Deron Winn on March 7, 2020, at UFC 248. He won the fight via a rear-naked choke submission in the third round.

Meerschaert was scheduled to face Ian Heinisch on June 6, 2020, at UFC 250, however, two days before the fight Heinisch's cornerman tested positive for COVID-19. Heinisch was pulled from the fight and replaced by promotional newcomer Anthony Ivy. Subsequently, the cornerman in question was re-tested and the initial test was proven to be false positive and Heinisch was reinstated to the card. Finally, Meerschaert faced Heinisch as originally scheduled and lost the fight via TKO in the first round.

Meerschaert was expected to face Ed Herman in a light heavyweight bout on August 1, 2020, at UFC Fight Night: Brunson vs. Shahbazyan. On the day of the event, Meerschaert pulled out due to testing positive for COVID-19 and his bout against Herman was cancelled. The bout was rescheduled for September 12, 2020, at UFC Fight Night 177. However, Meerschaert again withdrew from the bout for undisclosed reason and he was replaced by John Allan.

Meerschaert faced Khamzat Chimaev on September 19, 2020, at UFC Fight Night: Covington vs. Woodley. He lost the fight via knockout 17 seconds into round one.

==== 2021 ====
Meerschaert faced Bartosz Fabiński on April 17, 2021, at UFC on ESPN 22. He won the fight via technical submission in round one. This fight earned him the Performance of the Night award.

Meerschaert faced Makhmud Muradov on August 28, 2021, at UFC on ESPN 30. After a back-and-forth fight, he won the fight via rear-naked choke submission in round two. This win earned him the Performance of the Night award.

Meerschaert was scheduled to face Abusupiyan Magomedov on December 18, 2021, at UFC Fight Night 199. However, Magomedov was forced to pull from the event due to visa issue and he was replaced by Dustin Stoltzfus. He won the bout via rear-naked choke in the third round.

==== 2022 ====
Meerschaert faced Krzysztof Jotko on April 30, 2022, at UFC on ESPN 35. He lost the bout via unanimous decision.

Meerschaert faced Bruno Silva on August 13, 2022, at UFC on ESPN 41 He won the fight via a guillotine choke in round three.

==== 2023 ====
Meerschaert was scheduled again to face Abusupiyan Magomedov on February 18, 2023, at UFC Fight Night 219. The fight was cancelled, again due to Magomedov having visa issues.

Meerschaert faced Joe Pyfer on April 8, 2023, at UFC 287. He lost the bout via TKO in the first round.

Meerschaert faced Andre Petroski on August 19, 2023, at UFC 292. He lost the bout via split decision.

==== 2024 ====
Meerschaert faced Bryan Barberena on March 16, 2024, at UFC Fight Night 239. He won the bout by a rear-naked choke submission at the end of the second round.

Meerschaert faced Edmen Shahbazyan on August 24, 2024, at UFC on ESPN 62. Despite being dropped by a body blow and receiving repeated ground strikes, he won the fight via an arm-triangle submission in the second round. With his twelfth UFC finish, Meershaert surpassed Anderson Silva for the most finishes in UFC Middleweight history. This fight earned him another Performance of the Night award.

Meerschaert faced former ONE Light Heavyweight and Middleweight World Champion Reinier de Ridder on November 9, 2024 at UFC Fight Night 247. He lost the fight via an arm-triangle choke submission in the third round.

==== 2025 ====
Meerschaert faced Brad Tavares on April 5, 2025 at UFC on ESPN 65. He lost the fight by unanimous decision.

Meerschaert faced Michał Oleksiejczuk on August 16, 2025, at UFC 319. He lost the fight via technical knockout in round one.

Meerschaert faced Kyle Daukaus on November 15, 2025, at UFC 322. He lost the fight via a brabo choke submission early into round one.

==== 2026 ====
Meerschaert faced Jacob Malkoun on May 2, 2026 at UFC Fight Night 275. At the weigh-ins, Meerschaert weighed in at 190 pounds, 4 pounds over the middleweight non-title fight limit. His bout proceeded at catchweight and he was fined 30 percent of his purse, which went to Malkoun. He lost the fight via unanimous decision.

Moving to Light Heavyweight, Meerschaert faced Julius Walker on October 10, 2026 at UFC Fight Night 290. He lost the fight by technical knockout in the second round and retired from mixed martial arts competition afterward.

== Professional grappling career ==
Meerschaert stepped in on less than a week's notice to compete against Joe Pyfer at Fury Pro Grappling 7 on May 27, 2023. He lost the match by unanimous decision.

Meerschaert competed against Craig Jones in the main event of Polaris 26 on November 4, 2023. He lost the match by submission with a rear-naked choke.

== Personal life ==
Meerschaert earned the moniker "The Machine" after his friends saw him constantly pushing himself in the gym without taking any breaks. In his spare time, he plays the alto saxophone.

== Championships and accomplishments ==
- Ultimate Fighting Championship
  - Performance of the Night (Five times) vs. Eric Spicely, Joe Gigliotti, Bartosz Fabiński, Makhmud Muradov and Edmen Shahbazyan
  - Most submission wins in UFC Middleweight division history (11)
    - Tied (Demian Maia) for third most submissions in UFC history (11)
    - Second highest submission finish rate in UFC history (11 submissions / 12 wins - 91.7%)
    - Second most submission attempts in UFC Middleweight division history (19) (behind Thales Leites)
  - Most finishes in UFC Middleweight division history (12)
    - Highest finish rate in UFC history (12 finishes / 12 wins - 100%) (Minimum 10 UFC wins)
  - Second most bouts in UFC Middleweight division history (26) (behind Brad Tavares)
  - UFC Honors Awards
    - 2024: Fan's Choice Comeback of the Year Nominee vs. Edmen Shahbazyan
  - UFC.com Awards
    - 2021: Ranked #3 Upset of the Year vs. Makhmud Muradov
- Resurrection Fighting Alliance (RFA)
  - RFA Middleweight Championship (One time)
- Combat USA Championship
  - Wisconsin State Middleweight Championship (One time)

== Mixed martial arts record ==
Professional record breakdown
60 matches	37 wins	23 losses
By knockout	6	6
By submission	29	10
By decision	2	7

Res.	Record	Opponent	Method	Event	Date	Round	Time	Location	Notes
Loss	37–23	Julius Walker	TKO (punches)	UFC Fight Night: Allen vs. Duncan	October 10, 2026	2	3:35	Las Vegas, Nevada, United States	Return to Light Heavyweight.
Loss	37–22	Jacob Malkoun	Decision (unanimous)	UFC Fight Night: Della Maddalena vs. Prates	May 2, 2026	3	5:00	Perth, Australia	Catchweight (190 lb) bout; Meerschaert missed weight.
Loss	37–21	Kyle Daukaus	Submission (brabo choke)	UFC 322	November 15, 2025	1	0:50	New York City, New York, United States	
Loss	37–20	Michał Oleksiejczuk	TKO (punches)	UFC 319	August 16, 2025	1	3:03	Chicago, Illinois, United States	
Loss	37–19	Brad Tavares	Decision (unanimous)	UFC on ESPN: Emmett vs. Murphy	April 5, 2025	3	5:00	Las Vegas, Nevada, United States	
Loss	37–18	Reinier de Ridder	Submission (arm-triangle choke)	UFC Fight Night: Magny vs. Prates	November 9, 2024	3	1:44	Las Vegas, Nevada, United States	
Win	37–17	Edmen Shahbazyan	Submission (arm-triangle choke)	UFC on ESPN: Cannonier vs. Borralho	August 24, 2024	2	4:12	Las Vegas, Nevada, United States	Performance of the Night.
Win	36–17	Bryan Barberena	Technical Submission (face crank)	UFC Fight Night: Tuivasa vs. Tybura	March 16, 2024	2	4:23	Las Vegas, Nevada, United States	
Loss	35–17	Andre Petroski	Decision (split)	UFC 292	August 19, 2023	3	5:00	Boston, Massachusetts, United States	
Loss	35–16	Joe Pyfer	TKO (punches)	UFC 287	April 8, 2023	1	3:15	Miami, Florida, United States	
Win	35–15	Bruno Silva	Submission (guillotine choke)	UFC on ESPN: Vera vs. Cruz	August 13, 2022	3	1:39	San Diego, California, United States	
Loss	34–15	Krzysztof Jotko	Decision (unanimous)	UFC on ESPN: Font vs. Vera	April 30, 2022	3	5:00	Las Vegas, Nevada, United States	
Win	34–14	Dustin Stoltzfus	Submission (rear-naked choke)	UFC Fight Night: Lewis vs. Daukaus	December 18, 2021	3	2:59	Las Vegas, Nevada, United States	
Win	33–14	Makhmud Muradov	Submission (rear-naked choke)	UFC on ESPN: Barboza vs. Chikadze	August 28, 2021	2	1:49	Las Vegas, Nevada, United States	Performance of the Night.
Win	32–14	Bartosz Fabiński	Technical Submission (guillotine choke)	UFC on ESPN: Whittaker vs. Gastelum	April 17, 2021	1	2:00	Las Vegas, Nevada, United States	Performance of the Night.
Loss	31–14	Khamzat Chimaev	KO (punch)	UFC Fight Night: Covington vs. Woodley	September 19, 2020	1	0:17	Las Vegas, Nevada, United States	
Loss	31–13	Ian Heinisch	TKO (punches)	UFC 250	June 6, 2020	1	1:14	Las Vegas, Nevada, United States	
Win	31–12	Deron Winn	Submission (rear-naked choke)	UFC 248	March 7, 2020	3	2:14	Las Vegas, Nevada, United States	Winn tested positive for amphetamines.
Loss	30–12	Eryk Anders	Decision (split)	UFC Fight Night: Joanna vs. Waterson	October 12, 2019	3	5:00	Tampa, Florida, United States	
Win	30–11	Trevin Giles	Technical Submission (guillotine choke)	UFC on ESPN: Covington vs. Lawler	August 3, 2019	3	1:49	Newark, New Jersey, United States	
Loss	29–11	Kevin Holland	Decision (split)	UFC on ESPN: Barboza vs. Gaethje	March 30, 2019	3	5:00	Philadelphia, Pennsylvania, United States	
Loss	29–10	Jack Hermansson	Submission (guillotine choke)	UFC on Fox: Lee vs. Iaquinta 2	December 15, 2018	1	4:25	Milwaukee, Wisconsin, United States	
Win	29–9	Oskar Piechota	Technical Submission (rear-naked choke)	The Ultimate Fighter: Undefeated Finale	July 6, 2018	2	4:55	Las Vegas, Nevada, United States	
Win	28–9	Eric Spicely	TKO (body kick)	The Ultimate Fighter: A New World Champion Finale	December 1, 2017	2	2:18	Las Vegas, Nevada, United States	Performance of the Night.
Loss	27–9	Thiago Santos	TKO (punches)	UFC 213	July 8, 2017	2	2:04	Las Vegas, Nevada, United States	
Win	27–8	Ryan Janes	Submission (armbar)	UFC Fight Night: Lewis vs. Browne	February 19, 2017	1	1:34	Halifax, Nova Scotia, Canada	
Win	26–8	Joe Gigliotti	Submission (anaconda choke)	UFC Fight Night: Lewis vs. Abdurakhimov	December 9, 2016	1	4:12	Albany, New York, United States	Performance of the Night.
Win	25–8	Chase Waldon	Submission (arm-triangle choke)	RFA 45	October 26, 2016	1	1:44	Prior Lake, Minnesota, United States	Return to Middleweight. Won the RFA Middleweight Championship.
Win	24–8	Sidney Wheeler	Submission (kimura)	Valor Fights 36	August 13, 2016	1	1:22	Gatlinburg, Tennessee, United States	Light Heavyweight debut.
Win	23–8	Lucas Rota	TKO (doctor stoppage)	Titan FC 34	July 18, 2015	3	0:50	Kansas City, Missouri, United States	
Win	22–8	Keith Smetana	TKO (punches)	Dakota FC: Capital City Punishment	June 27, 2015	1	1:51	Bismarck, North Dakota, United States	
Win	21–8	Matt Lagou	Submission (arm-triangle choke)	KOTC: Magnum Force	September 27, 2014	1	1:26	Carlton, Minnesota, United States	
Loss	20–8	Sam Alvey	Decision (unanimous)	NAFC: Mega Brawl	May 31, 2014	3	5:00	Milwaukee, Wisconsin, United States	
Win	20–7	Eddie Larrea	Submission (arm-triangle choke)	NAFC: Super Brawl 2	January 31, 2014	2	1:05	Milwaukee, Wisconsin, United States	Return to Middleweight.
Win	19–7	Nathan Gunn	Submission (guillotine choke)	Canadian FC 8	September 13, 2013	2	2:00	Winnipeg, Manitoba, Canada	Catchweight (180 lb) bout.
Win	18–7	George Lockhart	Decision (unanimous)	National FC 58	July 19, 2013	3	5:00	Duluth, Georgia, United States	Catchweight (180 lb) bout.
Win	17–7	Jay Ellis	TKO (punches)	KOTC: Certified	April 20, 2013	1	1:03	Keshena, Wisconsin, United States	
Loss	16–7	Anthony Lapsley	Submission (rear-naked choke)	Rocktagon MMA 23	January 19, 2013	1	1:15	Cleveland, Ohio, United States	Catchweight (175 lb) bout.
Loss	16–6	Sergej Juskevic	Submission (kneebar)	Score Fighting Series 6	October 19, 2012	1	4:32	Sarnia, Ontario, Canada	
Win	16–5	Eddie Larrea	Submission (rear-naked choke)	Rogue Warrior Championships 3	September 6, 2012	1	3:35	Green Bay, Wisconsin, United States	
Loss	15–5	Herbert Goodman	Submission (rear-naked choke)	Combat USA - Wisconsin State Finals	April 22, 2011	1	1:28	Green Bay, Wisconsin, United States	
Win	15–4	Dallas O'Malley	Submission (guillotine choke)	Combat USA 24	January 6, 2011	2	0:38	Green Bay, Wisconsin, United States	
Win	14–4	Sam Alvey	Submission (guillotine choke)	Combat USA - Championship Tournament Finals	September 11, 2010	5	4:08	Green Bay, Wisconsin, United States	
Win	13–4	Ron Faircloth	Submission (rear-naked choke)	Madtown Throwdown - Worlds Collide	July 10, 2010	2	3:34	Madison, Wisconsin, United States	
Win	12–4	Jim Klimczyk	TKO (punches)	Combat USA 19	April 17, 2010	1	2:56	Wausau, Wisconsin, United States	
Win	11–4	Eddie Larrea	Submission (arm-triangle choke)	Extreme Cagefighting Organisation 4	March 20, 2010	2	0:52	Wisconsin Dells, Wisconsin, United States	
Win	10–4	Morrison Lamb	Submission (guillotine choke)	Racine Fight Night 5	November 28, 2009	1	1:02	Racine, Wisconsin, United States	
Win	9–4	Jacob Kuester	Submission (neck crank)	Gladiators Cage Fighting: Fair Warning	August 15, 2009	1	1:14	Milwaukee, Wisconsin, United States	
Loss	8–4	Kenny Robertson	Submission (kneebar)	Madtown Throwdown 19	May 2, 2009	1	3:15	Madison, Wisconsin, United States	
Loss	8–3	Curtis Bailey	Submission (guillotine choke)	Madtown Throwdown 17	October 10, 2008	1	1:19	Madison, Wisconsin, United States	
Win	8–2	Mike Vaughn	Submission (rear-naked choke)	Madtown Throwdown 16	July 25, 2008	2	N/A	Madison, Wisconsin, United States	
Win	7–2	Ryan Scheeper	Submission (armbar)	Freestyle Combat Challenge 35	May 3, 2008	1	0:40	Racine, Wisconsin, United States	
Win	6–2	Alex Carter	Submission (triangle choke)	Freestyle Combat Challenge 34	March 29, 2008	2	N/A	Kenosha, Wisconsin, United States	
Win	5–2	Caleb Krull	Decision (unanimous)	Freestyle Combat Challenge 33	February 23, 2008	3	3:00	Kenosha, Wisconsin, United States	
Win	4–2	Kenneth Allen	Submission (triangle choke)	Freestyle Combat Challenge 32	January 12, 2008	1	N/A	Kenosha, Wisconsin, United States	
Loss	3–2	Daisuke Hanazawa	Submission (kimura)	Freestyle Combat Challenge 29	August 11, 2007	1	N/A	Racine, Wisconsin, United States	
Win	3–1	Will Pace	Submission (rear-naked choke)	Freestyle Combat Challenge 28	May 19, 2007	1	N/A	Racine, Wisconsin, United States	
Win	2–1	Shane Kruchten	TKO (punches)	Freestyle Combat Challenge 27	May 12, 2007	2	N/A	Waukegan, Illinois, United States	
Loss	1–1	Jay Ellis	Technical Submission (choke)	Freestyle Combat Challenge 26	March 10, 2007	1	N/A	Kenosha, Wisconsin, United States	
Win	1–0	Fernando Gomez	Submission (rear-naked choke)	Freestyle Combat Challenge 25	January 13, 2007	1	N/A	Kenosha, Wisconsin, United States	

== See also ==
- List of male mixed martial artists
- List of UFC bonus award recipients
