= North American Fighting Championship =

American combat sports promotion

- Industry: Sports promotion
- Founded: 2010; 16 years ago
- Founder: Duke Roufus; Scott Joffe
- Defunct: September 6, 2025
- Headquarters: Milwaukee, Wisconsin

The North American Fighting Championship (NAFC) was an influential boxing and mixed martial arts (MMA) promotion company, established in 2010 by Duke Roufus and his business partner Scott Joffe.

Based in Milwaukee, Wisconsin, and working in conjunction with the Roufusport system, NAFC served as a successful fighter pipeline to major promotions like the UFC, PFL, and Bellator. Notable NAFC competitors include Sergio Pettis, Ricky Glenn, Chico Camus, and Sam Alvey.

Following Roufus' sudden passing in October, 2025, it was announced that NAFC would be ending all operations, its final event taking place a month prior on September 6, 2025.

== List of completed events ==
| No. | Event | Headline | Date | Location | Ref |
|---|---|---|---|---|---|
| 1 | NAFC: Bad Blood | Chico Camus vs. Jameel Massouh | November 24, 2010 | Potawatomi Bingo Casino Expo Center, Milwaukee, WI | |
| 2 | NAFC: Unleashed | Sergio Pettis vs. Tony Zelinski | November 18, 2011 | Potawatomi Bingo Casino Expo Center, Milwaukee, WI | |
| 3 | NAFC: Colosseum | Ricky Glenn vs. Charon Spain | May 4, 2012 | Potawatomi Bingo Casino Expo Center, Milwaukee, WI | |
| 4 | NAFC: Warriors | Elias Garcia vs. Cameron Monyelle | July 28, 2012 | Harley Davidson's Showroom, Milwaukee, Wisconsin | |
| 5 | NAFC: Armageddon | Craig Eckelberg vs. Charles Hansen | November 3, 2012 | WI State Fair-Products Pavilion, West Allis, Wisconsin | |
| 6 | NAFC: Winter War | Craig Eckelberg vs. Jake Klipp | February 9, 2013 | WI State Fair-Products Pavilion, West Allis, Wisconsin | |
| 7 | NAFC: Battleground | Sergio Pettis vs. Josh Robinson | March 29, 2013 | Potawatomi Bingo Casino Expo Center, Milwaukee, WI | |
| 8 | NAFC: Battle in the Ballroom | James Clark vs. Dan Gulotta | September 28, 2013 | Eagles Ballroom, Milwaukee, Wisconsin | |
| 9 | NAFC: Unrivaled | Kevin Vazquez vs. Nathan Couillard | December 7, 2013 | Eagles Ballroom, Milwaukee, Wisconsin | |
| 10 | NAFC: Super Brawl | Raquel Magdaleno vs. Amanda Lovato | January 31, 2014 | Eagles Ballroom, Milwaukee, Wisconsin | |
| 11 | NAFC: "Mega Brawl" MMA | Sam Alvey vs. Gerald Meerschaert | May 31, 2014 | BMO Harris Bradley Center, Milwaukee, Wisconsin | |
| 12 | NAFC: Summer Slam | Emmanuel Sanchez vs. Brady Hovermale | July 26, 2014 | Eagles Ballroom, Milwaukee, Wisconsin | |
| 13 | NAFC: Uprising | Craig Eckelberg vs. Eric Hammerich | September 20, 2014 | Eagles Ballroom, Milwaukee, Wisconsin | |
| 14 | NAFC: Explosion | Mike Rhodes vs. Tom Angeloff | April 11, 2015 | Waukesha County Expo Center, Waukesha, Wisconsin | |
| 15 | NAFC: Battledome | Alex Gilpin vs. Nate Jennerman | September 12, 2015 | Waukesha County Expo Center, Waukesha, Wisconsin | |
| 16 | NAFC: Super Brawl | Nate Jennerman vs. Jeremy Czarnecki | January 30, 2016 | Waukesha County Expo Center, Waukesha, Wisconsin | |
| 17 | NAFC: The Return | Nate Jennerman vs. Mike Plazola | November 6, 2021 | Waukesha County Expo Center, Waukesha, Wisconsin | |
| 18 | NAFC: Super Brawl | Christian Rodriguez vs. Ryan McIntosh | January 15, 2022 | Waukesha County Expo Center, Waukesha, Wisconsin | |
| 19 | NAFC: Colosseum | Josh Rohler vs. Jordan Griffin | April 16, 2022 | Waukesha County Expo Center, Waukesha, Wisconsin | |
| 20 | NAFC: Summer Slam | Jesse Murray vs. Alton Cunningham | June 4, 2022 | Waukesha County Expo Center, Waukesha, Wisconsin | |
| 21 | NAFC: Super Brawl | Chris Beal vs. Jordan Seufzer | March 25, 2023 | Waukesha County Expo Center, Waukesha, Wisconsin | |
| 22 | NAFC: Summer Slam | Connor Beiswenger vs. David Hassi | August 26, 2023 | Waukesha County Expo Center, Waukesha, Wisconsin | |
| 23 | NAFC: Season's Beatings | Deonte Moses Jr. vs. Klint Harvey | December 16, 2023 | Waukesha County Expo Center, Waukesha, Wisconsin | |
| 24 | NAFC: Super Brawl | Isaiah Flores vs. Michael Dombrowski | March 30, 2024 | Waukesha County Expo Center, Waukesha, Wisconsin | |
| 25 | NAFC: Summer Slam | Mitchell Abramczyk vs. Albert Cecchini | September 7, 2024 | Waukesha County Expo Center, Waukesha, Wisconsin | |
| 26 | NAFC: Season's Beatings | Finan Gebrebirhan vs. Trey White | December 14, 2024 | Waukesha County Expo Center, Waukesha, Wisconsin | |
| 27 | NAFC: Super Brawl | Nate Jennerman vs. Gary Konkol | April 19, 2025 | Waukesha County Expo Center, Waukesha, Wisconsin | |
| 28 | NAFC: Summer Slam | Tyler Peterick vs. Gary Konkol | September 6, 2025 | Waukesha County Expo Center, Waukesha, Wisconsin | |
