= Nursulton Ruziboev =

Uzbek mixed martial artist (born 1993)

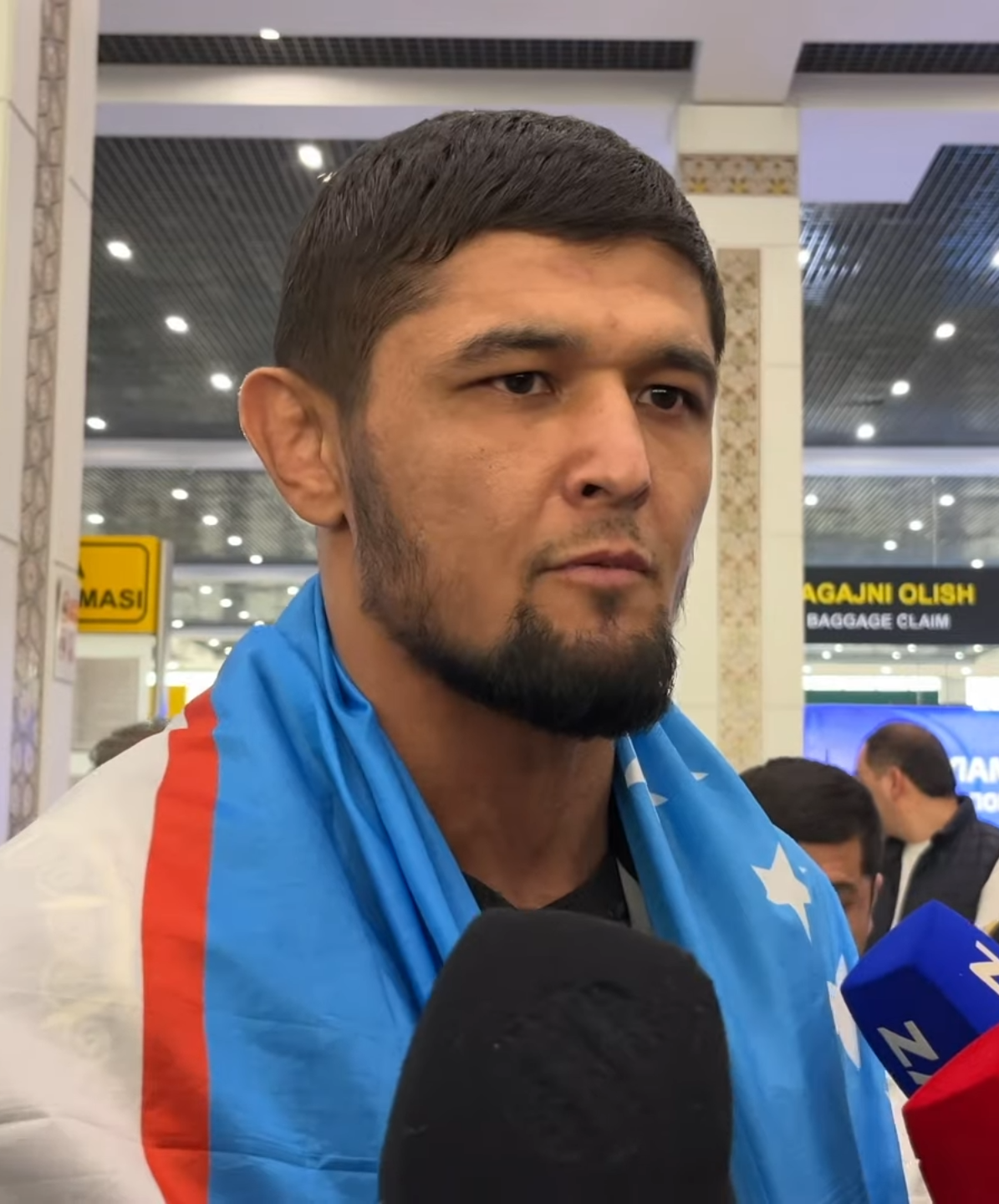
- Roʻziboyev in 2024
- Born: Nursulton Dilshodbek Ugli Ruziboev; November 19, 1993 (age 32); Shahrixon, Andijan Region, Uzbekistan
- Other names: Black
- Height: 6 ft 5 in (1.96 m)
- Weight: 185 lb (84 kg; 13 st 3 lb)
- Division: Lightweight (2014–2015); Welterweight (2014–present); Middleweight (2016–present)
- Reach: 76 in (193 cm)
- Stance: Orthodox
- Fighting out of: Tashkent, Uzbekistan
- Team: UZB Patriot; Renzo Gracie Philly
- Rank: Purple belt in Brazilian Jiu-Jitsu
- Years active: 2014–present

Professional boxing record
- Total: 2
- Wins: 2
- By knockout: 1

Mixed martial arts record
- Total: 51
- Wins: 37
- By knockout: 13
- By submission: 21
- By decision: 3
- Losses: 10
- By knockout: 1
- By submission: 1
- By decision: 8
- Draws: 2
- No contests: 2

Other information
- Boxing record from BoxRec
- Mixed martial arts record from Sherdog

Nursulton Dilshodbek Ugli Ruziboev (born November 19, 1993) is an Uzbek professional mixed martial artist and boxer who currently competes in the Welterweight and Middleweight divisions of the Ultimate Fighting Championship (UFC). As of August 8, 2026, he is #15 in the Meta UFC middleweight rankings.

== Background ==
Ruziboev was born on November 19, 1993, in Shahrixon, in the Andijan Region of Uzbekistan. He has two brothers and one sister. His brother, Mashrabjon Ruziboev, is also a professional mixed martial artist.

Starting at age 7-8, he began training in karate, and during his youth, he also trained combat sambo. Ruziboev began training mixed martial arts at the age of 16. In 2012, he left the country for Russia, where he worked to support his family. In 2013, he returned to Uzbekistan to participate in hand-to-hand combat tournaments. Ruziboev also earned a master's degree from Uzbekistan National University.

== Mixed martial arts career ==
=== Early career ===
In 2014, Ruziboev began his professional career in Kazakhstan's Alash Pride organization. He has fought under prominent organizations such as Brave Combat Federation, Absolute Championship Berkut, and Fight Nights Global. Ruziboev is a former Middlewight Champion of the Open Fighting Championship and WEF Global.

=== Ultimate Fighting Championship ===
In 2023, Ruziboev signed a contract with the UFC and made his debut against Brunno Ferreira on July 1, 2023, at UFC on ESPN 48. He won the bout via KO in the first round. This win earned him the Performance of the Night.

Ruziboev was scheduled to face Caio Borralho on November 4, 2023, at UFC Fight Night 231. However, Ruziboev withdrew for unknown reasons and was replaced by Abusupiyan Magomedov.

Ruziboev faced Sedriques Dumas on March 30, 2024, at UFC on ESPN 54. He won the bout via TKO in the first round.

Ruziboev faced Joaquin Buckley in a welterweight bout on May 11, 2024, at UFC on ESPN 56. He lost the fight by unanimous decision.

Ruziboev was scheduled to face Rinat Fakhretdinov on October 26, 2024, at UFC 308. However, Ruziboev withdrew from the fight due to an injury and was replaced by former LFA Welterweight Champion and promotional newcomer Carlos Leal.

Ruziboev faced promotional newcomer Eric McConico in a middleweight bout on February 22, 2025 at UFC Fight Night 252. He won the fight by technical knockout in the second round.

Ruziboev faced Dustin Stoltzfus on May 17, 2025 at UFC Fight Night 256. He won the fight by unanimous decision.

Ruziboev was scheduled to face The Return of The Ultimate Fighter: Team Volkanovski vs. Team Ortega middleweight tournament winner Bryan Battle on August 16, 2025 in a middleweight bout at UFC 319. At the weigh-ins, Battle weighed in at 190 pounds, four pounds over the middleweight non-title fight limit. The bout was scheduled to proceed at catchweight, however shortly thereafter, it was announced that the bout had been cancelled.

Ruziboev faced Andrey Pulyaev on June 27, 2026 at UFC Fight Night 280. He won the fight via a rear-naked choke submission in the first round.

Ruziboev faced Michael Page on September 5, 2026, at UFC Fight Night 287. He lost the fight by unanimous decision.

== Championships and accomplishments ==
=== Mixed martial arts ===
- Ultimate Fighting Championship
  - Performance of the Night (One time) vs. Brunno Ferreira
- Asian Fighting Championship Akhmat
  - AFCA Middleweight Tournament winner
- World Ertaymash Federation
  - WEF Middleweight Championship (Three times)
- World Fighting Championship Akhmat
  - WFCA Welterweight Championship (One time)
- Open Fighting Championship
  - OFC Middleweight Championship

== Mixed martial arts record ==
Professional record breakdown
51 matches	37 wins	10 losses
By knockout	13	1
By submission	21	1
By decision	3	8
Draws	2	
No contests	2	

Res.	Record	Opponent	Method	Event	Date	Round	Time	Location	Notes
Loss	37–10–2 (2)	Michael Page	Decision (unanimous)	UFC Fight Night: Hooker vs. Parnasse	September 5, 2026	3	5:00	Paris, France	
Win	37–9–2 (2)	Andrey Pulyaev	Technical Submission (neck crank)	UFC Fight Night: Fiziev vs. Torres	June 27, 2026	1	3:58	Baku, Azerbaijan	
Win	36–9–2 (2)	Dustin Stoltzfus	Decision (unanimous)	UFC Fight Night: Burns vs. Morales	May 17, 2025	3	5:00	Las Vegas, Nevada, United States	
Win	35–9–2 (2)	Eric McConico	TKO (punches)	UFC Fight Night: Cejudo vs. Song	February 22, 2025	2	0:32	Seattle, Washington, United States	
Loss	34–9–2 (2)	Joaquin Buckley	Decision (unanimous)	UFC on ESPN: Lewis vs. Nascimento	May 11, 2024	3	5:00	St. Louis, Missouri, United States	Welterweight bout.
Win	34–8–2 (2)	Sedriques Dumas	TKO (punches)	UFC on ESPN: Blanchfield vs. Fiorot	March 30, 2024	1	3:18	Atlantic City, New Jersey, United States	
Win	33–8–2 (2)	Brunno Ferreira	KO (punches)	UFC on ESPN: Strickland vs. Magomedov	July 1, 2023	1	1:17	Las Vegas, Nevada, United States	Performance of the Night.
Win	32–8–2 (2)	Pavel Masalski	Submission (armbar)	WEF Global 17	April 10, 2022	1	2:25	Saint Petersburg, Russia	Defended the WEF Global Middleweight Championship.
Win	31–8–2 (2)	Luciano Contini	Submission (kimura)	Octagon 27	February 19, 2022	1	0:44	Tashkent, Uzbekistan	
Win	30–8–2 (2)	Eduard Arustamyan	TKO (punches)	Open FC 14	December 12, 2021	1	1:51	Almaty, Kazakhstan	Defended the Open FC Middleweight Championship.
Win	29–8–2 (2)	Alexander Dolotenko	Submission (kimura)	Amir Temur FC 3	September 25, 2021	1	N/A	Tashkent, Uzbekistan	
Win	28–8–2 (2)	Alex de Paula	TKO (punches)	Open FC 10	September 12, 2021	1	3:41	Moscow, Russia	Won the vacant Open FC Middleweight Championship.
Win	27–8–2 (2)	Ibrahim Mané	KO (slam)	Brave CF 47	March 11, 2021	1	3:12	Arad, Bahrain	Catchweight (175 lb) bout.
Win	26–8–2 (2)	Bogdan Kotlovyanov	Submission (rear-naked choke)	Open FC 2	February 20, 2021	1	1:03	Samara, Russia	Return to Middleweight.
Win	25–8–2 (2)	Maksym Soroka	Submission (kimura)	WFCA: Andijan Mayor Cup	January 10, 2021	1	0:35	Andijan, Uzbekistan	Won the vacant WFCA Welterweight Championship.
Loss	24–8–2 (2)	Boris Miroshnichenko	Decision (unanimous)	ProFC 66	December 22, 2019	3	5:00	Rostov-on-Don, Russia	Return to Welterweight.
Win	24–7–2 (2)	Artem Shokalo	TKO (corner stoppage)	Gorilla Fighting 20	November 23, 2019	2	2:00	Tashkent, Uzbekistan	
Win	23–7–2 (2)	Leonid Antonov	Submission (armbar)	Professional Combat Turon 4	September 22, 2019	1	2:04	Yunusabad, Uzbekistan	Return to Middleweight.
NC	22–7–2 (2)	Altynbek Arykbaev	NC (overturned by promoter)	WEF ProFight 36	August 17, 2019	1	5:00	Kara-Suu, Kyrgyzstan	
Loss	22–7–2 (1)	Murad Ramazanov	Decision (unanimous)	Gorets FC: For the Prizes of V. Zolotov	July 6, 2019	3	5:00	Kaspiysk, Russia	
Loss	22–6–2 (1)	Oleg Dadonov	Decision (unanimous)	Battle for Tula 3	December 21, 2018	3	5:00	Tula, Russia	Return to Welterweight.
Win	22–5–2 (1)	Marcos Yoshio de Souza	TKO (knee and punches)	WEF Global 14	November 10, 2018	3	0:29	Bishkek, Kyrgyzstan	Defended the WEF Global Middleweight Championship.
Win	21–5–2 (1)	Andrey Seledtsov	Submission (hammerlock)	Battle for Tula 2	September 28, 2018	2	1:14	Tula, Russia	Middleweight bout.
Loss	20–5–2 (1)	Kiamrian Abbasov	Decision (unanimous)	WFCA 50	August 18, 2018	3	5:00	Moscow, Russia	
Win	20–4–2 (1)	Sultan Kiyalov	Submission (rear-naked choke)	Alash Pride FC: Shymkent	April 14, 2018	2	1:58	Şymkent, Kazakhstan	Catchweight (173.3 lb) bout; Ruziboev missed weight.
Win	19–4–2 (1)	Erzhan Kenzhegulov	Submission (armbar)	Legion FC: Universal Battle 1	February 8, 2018	1	3:15	Tashkent, Uzbekistan	
Win	18–4–2 (1)	Igor Bayer	TKO (punches)	WFCA 44	December 17, 2017	1	N/A	Grozny, Russia	Return to Welterweight.
Draw	17–4–2 (1)	Erbolot Omurzakov	Draw (majority)	WEF Global 10	November 22, 2017	5	5:00	Bishkek, Kyrgyzstan	Retained the WEF Global Middleweight Championship.
Win	17–4–1 (1)	Amkhad Dzhanchuraev	KO (punches)	Ambitions FC 21	November 18, 2017	1	1:40	Yekaterinburg, Russia	Welterweight bout.
Win	16–4–1 (1)	Artem Kazbanov	KO (knee)	GIT Crimea 2017	September 23, 2017	1	0:45	Yalta, Ukraine	
Win	15–4–1 (1)	Almanbet Nuraly	Submission (armbar)	WEF Global 9	September 8, 2017	1	1:50	Bishkek, Kyrgyzstan	Return to Middleweight. Won the vacant WEF Global Middleweight Championship.
NC	14–4–1 (1)	Magomed Abdulvagabov	NC (overturned by promoter)	Fight Nights Global 73	September 4, 2017	1	4:12	Kaspiysk, Russia	Originally a submission (armbar) win for Ruziboev; overturned by promoter due to premature stoppage.
Loss	14–4–1	Dzhokhar Duraev	Decision (unanimous)	ACB 68	August 26, 2017	3	5:00	Dushanbe, Tajikistan	Return to Welterweight.
Draw	14–3–1	Eler Narmurzaev	Draw (unanimous)	Legion FC: Unifight 2017	July 30, 2017	3	5:00	Tashkent, Uzbekistan	
Win	14–3	Aylchi Sultanali	Submission (rear-naked choke)	WEF Selection 11	July 2, 2017	1	1:20	Moscow, Russia	Catchweight (176 lb) bout.
Win	13–3	Ramazan Gimbatov	Submission (armbar)	Fight Club 777	May 20, 2017	1	1:21	Almaty, Kazakhstan	Won the AFCA Middleweight Tournament.
Win	12–3	Arman Alimov	Decision (unanimous)	Fight Club 777	May 20, 2017	2	5:00	Almaty, Kazakhstan	AFCA Middleweight Tournament Semifinal.
Win	11–3	Artem Reznikov	TKO (knee and punches)	Fight Club 777	May 20, 2017	1	1:23	Almaty, Kazakhstan	AFCA Middleweight Tournament Quarterfinal.
Win	10–3	Suyarbek Saifov	KO (punches)	Tajikistan FC: Danghara 2016	November 27, 2016	1	3:14	Danghara, Tajikistan	
Loss	9–3	Daniyar Abdibaev	Submission (kimura)	WEF Global 6	October 22, 2016	2	4:41	Bishkek, Kyrgyzstan	
Win	9–2	Vladimir Katykhin	Decision (unanimous)	N-1 Pro: Asian Fighter 2016	October 2, 2016	3	5:00	Karaganda, Kazakhstan	Middleweight debut.
Win	8–2	Orzubek Seytimbetov	Submission (guillotine choke)	Asian FC: Akhmat 2	December 24, 2015	1	2:01	Samarkand, Uzbekistan	
Loss	7–2	Anvar Chergesov	Decision (unanimous)	Seven Fight 2015	June 19, 2015	2	5:00	Ivanovo, Russia	
Win	7–1	Islam Yashaev	Submission (rear-naked choke)	ACB 17	May 2, 2015	2	3:15	Grozny, Russia	
Win	6–1	Rakhmanberdi Tologon	Submission (rear-naked choke)	WEF Global 2	March 15, 2015	1	1:56	Bishkek, Kyrgyzstan	Lightweight bout.
Win	5–1	Elshon Muhtarov	Submission (kimura)	Alash Pride: Royal Plaza 2	January 24, 2015	1	0:31	Almaty, Kazakhstan	
Win	4–1	Shahvalat Yusubov	Submission (rear-naked choke)	R-1: Heavyweight Grand Prix 2015	January 23, 2015	1	3:59	Tashkent, Uzbekistan	
Win	3–1	Aziz Ibragimov	Submission (rear-naked choke)	Alash Pride: Selection 6	December 25, 2014	1	0:38	Kaskelen, Kazakhstan	Lightweight bout.
Loss	2–1	Daniyar Babakulov	TKO (punches)	Alash Pride: Royal Plaza 1	December 13, 2014	2	0:32	Almaty, Kazakhstan	
Win	2–0	Kiamrian Abbasov	Submission (guillotine choke)	Alash Pride: Selection 5	October 26, 2014	2	1:10	Kaskelen, Kazakhstan	Welterweight debut.
Win	1–0	Shamil Rafikov	Submission (rear-naked choke)	Alash Pride: Selection 4	August 16, 2014	2	1:53	Kyzylorda, Kazakhstan	Lightweight debut.

== Professional boxing record ==
2 fights	2 wins	0 losses
By knockout	1	0
By decision	1	0

No.	Result	Record	Opponent	Type	Round, time	Date	Location	Notes
2	Win	2–0	Azamat Ergashev	UD	4	May 5, 2022	Sport Palace Yunusabad, Tashkent, Uzbekistan	
1	Win	1–0	Bakhrom Payazov	KO	2 (6) 0:54	Mar 14, 2022	Sport Palace Yunusabad, Tashkent, Uzbekistan	

== See also ==
- List of current UFC fighters
- List of male mixed martial artists
