= UFC Fight Night: Nelson vs. Ponzinibbio =

UFC mixed martial arts event in 2017

- The poster for UFC Fight Night: Nelson vs. Ponzinibbio
- Promotion: Ultimate Fighting Championship
- Date: July 16, 2017
- Venue: The SSE Hydro
- City: Glasgow, Scotland
- Attendance: 10,589
- Total gate: $1,200,000

Event chronology
UFC 213: Romero vs. Whittaker	UFC Fight Night: Nelson vs. Ponzinibbio	UFC on Fox: Weidman vs. Gastelum

UFC Fight Night: Nelson vs. Ponzinibbio (also known as UFC Fight Night 113) was a mixed martial arts event produced by the Ultimate Fighting Championship held on July 16, 2017, at The SSE Hydro in Glasgow, Scotland.

== Background ==
The event was the second that the promotion has hosted in Glasgow, following UFC Fight Night: Bisping vs. Leites in July 2015.

A welterweight bout between Gunnar Nelson and Santiago Ponzinibbio headlined the event.

Mark Godbeer was expected to face promotional newcomer Justin Willis at the event. However, Godbeer pulled out of the fight on May 21 citing injury and was replaced by fellow newcomer James Mulheron.

Lina Länsberg was expected to face Leslie Smith at the event, but she pulled out on June 21 due to undisclosed reasons and was replaced by promotional newcomer Amanda Lemos.

Mitch Gagnon was expected to face Brett Johns at the event. However, Gagnon was removed from the card on June 27 and replaced by Albert Morales.

At the weigh-ins, Joanne Calderwood came in at 118 lb, two pounds over the strawweight limit of 116 lb. As a result, she was fined 20% of her purse, which went to Cynthia Calvillo and their bout proceeded as scheduled at a catchweight.

== Results ==
Main Card (Fox Sports 1)
Weight class				Method	Round	Time	Notes
Welterweight	Santiago Ponzinibbio	def.	Gunnar Nelson	KO (punches)	1	1:22
Catchweight (118 lb)	Cynthia Calvillo	def.	Joanne Calderwood	Decision (unanimous) (30–27, 30–27, 29–28)	3	5:00
Lightweight	Paul Felder	def.	Stevie Ray	KO (elbows)	1	3:57
Middleweight	Jack Marshman	def.	Ryan Janes	Decision (unanimous) (29–28, 29–28, 29–28)	3	5:00
Light Heavyweight	Khalil Rountree Jr.	def.	Paul Craig	KO (punches)	1	4:56
Heavyweight	Justin Willis	def.	James Mulheron	Decision (unanimous) (30–27, 30–27, 30–27)	3	5:00
Preliminary Card (Fox Sports 1)
Welterweight	Danny Roberts	def.	Bobby Nash	KO (punches)	2	3:59
Flyweight	Alexandre Pantoja	def.	Neil Seery	Submission (rear-naked choke)	3	2:31
Welterweight	Galore Bofando	def.	Charlie Ward	KO (slam and punches)	1	2:10
Lightweight	Danny Henry	def.	Daniel Teymur	Decision (unanimous) (29–28, 29–28, 29–26)	3	5:00
Preliminary Card (UFC Fight Pass)
Bantamweight	Brett Johns	def.	Albert Morales	Decision (unanimous) (30–27, 30–27, 30–25)	3	5:00
Women's Bantamweight	Leslie Smith	def.	Amanda Lemos	TKO (punches and elbows)	2	2:53

== Bonus awards ==
The following fighters were awarded $50,000 bonuses:

- Fight of the Night: Danny Henry vs. Daniel Teymur
- Performance of the Night: Santiago Ponzinibbio and Paul Felder

== See also ==
- List of UFC events
- 2017 in UFC
