= UFC Fight Night: Fiziev vs. Torres =

Mixed martial arts event in 2026

- The poster for UFC Fight Night: Fiziev vs. Torres
- Promotion: Ultimate Fighting Championship
- Date: June 27, 2026
- Venue: National Gymnastics Arena
- City: Baku, Azerbaijan
- Attendance: Not announced

Event chronology
UFC Fight Night: Kape vs. Horiguchi	UFC Fight Night: Fiziev vs. Torres	UFC 329: McGregor vs. Holloway 2

UFC Fight Night: Fiziev vs. Torres (also known as UFC Fight Night 280) was a mixed martial arts event produced by the Ultimate Fighting Championship that took place on June 27, 2026, at the National Gymnastics Arena in Baku, Azerbaijan.

== Background ==
This event marked the promotion's second visit to Baku and first since UFC on ABC: Hill vs. Rountree Jr. in June 2025. It was also the first event after the promotion signed a multi-year cooperation agreement with the Ministry of Youth and Sports and the Baku City Circuit (BCC) Operations Company that will see Fight Night events being held annually in the city until 2028.

A lightweight bout between Rafael Fiziev and Manuel Torres headlined the event. The card was originally rumored to be headlined by a middleweight bout between Michał Oleksiejczuk and Abusupiyan Magomedov, but it was later moved to a different spot on the main card for undisclosed reasons.

Former UFC Middleweight Championship challenger Marvin Vettori was expected to face Ismail Naurdiev in a middleweight bout. However, Vettori pulled out on May 21 due to a broken rib. Therefore, the bout was scrapped.

A welterweight bout between Andreas Gustafsson and Daniil Donchenko was scheduled for the event. However, Gustafsson withdrew after revealing he had been suffering from atrial fibrillation and recurring heart rushes, and was replaced by promotional newcomer Theodor Berggren.

A heavyweight bout between Rizvan Kuniev and Tyrell Fortune was scheduled for the event. However, the bout was moved to UFC Fight Night: Ankalaev vs. Rountree Jr. one month later for undisclosed reasons.

== Results ==
Main card (Paramount+)
Weight class				Method	Round	Time	Notes
Lightweight	Rafael Fiziev	def.	Manuel Torres	KO (spinning wheel kick and punches)	2	0:15
Middleweight	Sharabutdin Magomedov	def.	Michel Pereira	Decision (unanimous) (29–28, 29–28, 29–28)	3	5:00
Lightweight	Matheus Camilo	def.	Nazim Sadykhov	TKO (punches)	1	1:31
Flyweight	Asu Almabayev	def.	Charles Johnson	Submission (Suloev stretch)	3	3:33
Middleweight	Ikram Aliskerov	def.	Brunno Ferreira	Decision (unanimous) (30–27, 30–27, 30–27)	3	5:00
Middleweight	Abusupiyan Magomedov	def.	Michał Oleksiejczuk	Submission (guillotine choke)	1	3:25
Preliminary card (Paramount+)
Welterweight	Farman Hasanov	def.	Eric Nolan	Decision (unanimous) (30–27, 30–27, 30–27)	3	5:00
Light Heavyweight	Abdul-Rakhman Yakhyaev	def.	Julius Walker	KO (punches)	1	0:08
Middleweight	Nursulton Ruziboev	def.	Andrey Pulyaev	Technical Submission (neck crank)	1	3:58
Featherweight	Kaan Ofli	def.	Javier Reyes	Submission (arm-triangle choke)	1	4:16
Welterweight	Daniil Donchenko	def.	Theodor Berggren	TKO (head kick and punches)	2	1:35
Bantamweight	Jean Matsumoto	def.	Bekzat Almakhan	Decision (unanimous) (29–28, 29–28, 29–28)	3	5:00
Welterweight	Tahir Abdullayev	def.	Jefferson Nascimento	TKO (punches)	3	4:28

== Bonus awards ==
The following fighters received $100,000 bonuses. The other finishes received $25,000 additional bonuses.

- Fight of the Night: No bonus awarded.
- Performance of the Night: Rafael Fiziev, Asu Almabayev, Abdul-Rakhman Yakhyaev and Daniil Donchenko

== See also ==
- 2026 in UFC
- List of current UFC fighters
- List of UFC events
