= Brunno Ferreira =

Brazilian mixed martial artist (born 1992)

- Born: Brunno Klynton Angulski Santiago Ferreira; November 4, 1992 (age 34); Curitiba, Paraná, Brazil
- Other names: The Hulk
- Height: 5 ft 10 in (1.78 m)
- Weight: 185 lb (84 kg; 13 st 3 lb)
- Division: Middleweight
- Reach: 72 in (183 cm)
- Fighting out of: Curitiba, Brazil
- Team: Brazilian TKO
- Rank: First dan black belt in Judo; First degree black belt in Brazilian jiu-jitsu
- Years active: 2019–present

Mixed martial arts record
- Total: 20
- Wins: 15
- By knockout: 9
- By submission: 5
- By decision: 1
- Losses: 5
- By knockout: 2
- By submission: 1
- By decision: 2

Other information
- Mixed martial arts record from Sherdog

Brunno Klynton Angulski Santiago Ferreira (born November 4, 1992) is a Brazilian mixed martial artist. He currently competes in the Middleweight division of the Ultimate Fighting Championship (UFC).

== Background ==
Ferreira was born in Curitiba, Paraná, Brazil. He began practicing judo at age of 4, which he was once on the path to Olympics trials, but an injury sustained during training caused. Around at age of 16, he started jiu-jitsu after sustaining an injury. During the COVID-19 pandemic, Ferreira started making deliveries by bicycle and also worked as a security guard.

== Mixed martial arts career ==
=== Early career ===
Ferreira started his professional career in 2019, at the Brazilian regional circuit and amassed an undefeated record at 8–0, with 100% finish rate before he will compete at Dana White's Contender Series in 2022.

=== Dana White's Contender Series ===
Ferreira was invited to participate in the 6th season of Dana White's Contender Series and faced Leon Aliu on September 20, 2022. He won the fight via technical knockout in round one and was awarded a UFC contract.

=== Ultimate Fighting Championship ===
Replacing Brad Tavares, who withdrew due to an injury, Ferreira made his UFC debut against Gregory Rodrigues on January 21, 2023, at UFC 283. He won the fight via knockout in round one.

Ferreira was scheduled to face Abdul Razak Alhassan on May 20, 2023, at UFC Fight Night 223. However, the bout was moved to UFC on ESPN 48 on July 1, 2023, for unknown reasons. In turn, Alhassan pulled out in late June and was replaced by Nursulton Ruziboev. He lost the fight via knockout in round one.

Ferreira faced Phil Hawes on January 13, 2024, at UFC Fight Night 234. He won the fight via knockout in round one. This win earned him the first $50,000 Performance of the Night award.

Ferreira faced Dustin Stoltzfus on June 8, 2024 at UFC on ESPN 57. He won the fight by knockout via a spinning back elbow in round one. This win earned him the $50,000 Performance of the Night award.

Ferreira was scheduled to face Roman Kopylov on August 24, 2024 at UFC on ESPN 62. However, Kopylov withdrew from the bout after having appendicitis surgery, so the bout was cancelled.

Ferreira faced Abusupiyan Magomedov on October 26, 2024, at UFC 308. He lost the fight via arm-triangle choke in round three.

Ferreira faced Armen Petrosyan on March 8, 2025, at UFC 313. After Petrosyan was deducted one point due to repeated groin strikes, he won the fight via a triangle armbar submission in round two.

Ferreira was scheduled to face Ikram Aliskerov on July 19, 2025, at UFC 318. However on June 30, Aliskerov withdrew from the fight due to a broken toe and was replaced by promotional newcomer Jackson McVey. He won the fight via a armbar in round one.

Ferreira faced Marvin Vettori on December 6, 2025, at UFC 323. At the weigh-ins, Ferreira weighed in at 189 pounds, 3 pounds over the middleweight non-title fight limit. His bout proceeded at catchweight and he was fined 20 percent of his purse which went to Vettori. He won the fight via unanimous decision.

Ferreira was scheduled to face Paulo Costa on March 7, 2026, at UFC 326. However, Costa withdrew on December 26 for undisclosed reasons and was replaced by Gregory Rodrigues, setting up a rematch between them. He lost the fight via knockout in round one.

Ferreira faced Ikram Aliskerov on June 27, 2026, at UFC Fight Night 280. He lost the fight via unanimous decision.

Ferreira faced Edmen Shahbazyan on September 19, 2026 at UFC 331. He lost the fight by unanimous decision.

== Championships and accomplishments ==
- Ultimate Fighting Championship
  - Performance of the Night (Two times) vs. Phil Hawes and Dustin Stoltzfus
- Big Shot MMA
  - Big Shot MMA Middleweight Championship (One time)

== Mixed martial arts record ==
Professional record breakdown
20 matches	15 wins	5 losses
By knockout	9	2
By submission	5	1
By decision	1	2

Res.	Record	Opponent	Method	Event	Date	Round	Time	Location	Notes
Loss	15–5	Edmen Shahbazyan	Decision (unanimous)	UFC 331	September 19, 2026	3	5:00	Los Angeles, California, United States	
Loss	15–4	Ikram Aliskerov	Decision (unanimous)	UFC Fight Night: Fiziev vs. Torres	June 27, 2026	3	5:00	Baku, Azerbaijan	
Loss	15–3	Gregory Rodrigues	KO (punch)	UFC 326	March 7, 2026	1	1:47	Las Vegas, Nevada, United States	
Win	15–2	Marvin Vettori	Decision (unanimous)	UFC 323	December 6, 2025	3	5:00	Las Vegas, Nevada, United States	Catchweight (189 lb) bout; Ferreira missed weight.
Win	14–2	Jackson McVey	Submission (armbar)	UFC 318	July 19, 2025	1	3:35	New Orleans, Louisiana, United States	
Win	13–2	Armen Petrosyan	Submission (triangle armbar)	UFC 313	March 8, 2025	2	4:52	Las Vegas, Nevada, United States	Petrosyan was deducted one point in round 1 due to repeated groin strikes.
Loss	12–2	Abusupiyan Magomedov	Submission (arm-triangle choke)	UFC 308	October 26, 2024	3	3:14	Abu Dhabi, United Arab Emirates	
Win	12–1	Dustin Stoltzfus	KO (spinning back elbow)	UFC on ESPN: Cannonier vs. Imavov	June 8, 2024	1	4:51	Louisville, Kentucky, United States	Performance of the Night.
Win	11–1	Phil Hawes	KO (punches)	UFC Fight Night: Ankalaev vs. Walker 2	January 13, 2024	1	4:55	Las Vegas, Nevada, United States	Performance of the Night.
Loss	10–1	Nursulton Ruziboev	KO (punches)	UFC on ESPN: Strickland vs. Magomedov	July 1, 2023	1	1:17	Las Vegas, Nevada, United States	
Win	10–0	Gregory Rodrigues	KO (punch)	UFC 283	January 21, 2023	1	4:13	Rio de Janeiro, Brazil	
Win	9–0	Leon Aliu	TKO (punches)	Dana White's Contender Series 55	September 20, 2022	1	1:35	Las Vegas, Nevada, United States	
Win	8–0	Adercino de Jesus	KO (punch)	Big Shot MMA 3	June 4, 2022	1	1:53	Goiânia, Brazil	Won the vacant Big Shot MMA Middleweight Championship.
Win	7–0	Weldon Silva de Oliveira	TKO (punches)	Brazilian Fighting Series 8	April 16, 2022	1	4:40	Curitiba, Brazil	
Win	6–0	Sebastião Ferreira	TKO (punches)	Big Shot MMA 2	January 23, 2022	2	0:12	Florianópolis, Brazil	
Win	5–0	Ewerton Polaquini	Submission (arm-triangle choke)	Maktub Fight Pro 19	August 21, 2021	1	3:51	Curitiba, Brazil	
Win	4–0	Allan da Silva Peña	Submission (rear-naked choke)	Road to Future 3	August 1, 2021	1	2:12	Goiânia, Brazil	
Win	3–0	Victor Pereira Neves	TKO (punch)	Katana Fight 10	December 7, 2019	2	1:08	Pinhais, Brazil	
Win	2–0	Carlos Barbiere	TKO (punches)	Metanoia Fight Combat 4	October 5, 2019	1	2:45	Curitiba, Brazil	
Win	1–0	Robson Eufrasio Lima	Submission (anaconda choke)	Curitiba Fight Pro 7	April 6, 2019	2	1:23	Curitiba, Brazil	Middleweight debut.

== See also ==
- List of current UFC fighters
- List of male mixed martial artists
