= Dustin Stoltzfus =

American mixed martial artist and kickboxer

- Born: November 15, 1991 (age 34); Lancaster, Pennsylvania, U.S.
- Height: 5 ft 11 in (1.80 m)
- Weight: 185 lb (84 kg; 13 st 3 lb)
- Division: Light Heavyweight; Middleweight
- Reach: 75 in (191 cm)
- Fighting out of: Germersheim, Germany
- Team: Frankers Fight Team (2014–present); Planet Eater
- Rank: Purple belt in Brazilian Jiu-Jitsu; Black belt in Luta Livre under Dominic Englert and Christoph Schadek; Red belt in Tang Soo Do
- Years active: 2014–present

Mixed martial arts record
- Total: 25
- Wins: 17
- By knockout: 3
- By submission: 7
- By decision: 6
- By disqualification: 1
- Losses: 8
- By knockout: 2
- By submission: 2
- By decision: 4

Other information
- University: Middle Tennessee State University; Johannes Gutenberg University Mainz
- Mixed martial arts record from Sherdog

Dustin Stoltzfus (born November 15, 1991) is an American mixed martial artist and former kickboxer. He currently competes in the middleweight division of the Ultimate Fighting Championship.

== Background ==
Stoltzfus grew up in the Pennsylvania Dutch community outside of Ronks, Pennsylvania to former Amish parents. Stoltzfus started Folkstyle Wrestling as a child, moving to Tang Soo Do, Kung Fu and other martial arts growing up. After graduating from Lampeter-Strasburg High School, he attended Middle Tennessee State University, where he also got introduced to Brazilian Jiu-Jitsu. He graduated with Bachelor's in both foreign languages and economics, and subsequently moved to Germany – where he had already studied abroad – in 2014. In Germany he attended Johannes Gutenberg University Mainz where he graduated with Master's in translation.

== Mixed martial arts career ==
=== Early career ===
Stoltzfus fought once as an amateur in 2012, losing via decision. Two years later, he began competing as a professional in the Central-European regional circuit. He compiled a 12–1 record while claiming the FFA Middleweight Championship and defending it twice.

=== Dana White's Contender Series ===
Stoltzfus was then invited to face Joe Pyfer at Dana White's Contender Series 28 on August 11, 2020. He won the fight via technical knockout due to an injury stemming from a slam and was awarded a contract with the UFC.

=== Ultimate Fighting Championship ===
Stoltzfus made his promotional debut against Kyle Daukaus at UFC 255 on November 21, 2020. He lost the fight via unanimous decision.

Stoltzfus faced Rodolfo Vieira at UFC on ESPN 26 on July 17, 2021. He lost the fight via third-round submission.

Stoltzfus was expected to face Anthony Hernandez at UFC Fight Night 199 on December 18, 2021. However, Hernandez withdrew from the event due to undisclosed reasons and was replaced by newcomer Caio Borralho. In turn, Borralho and Gerald Meerschaert's opponent, Abusupiyan Magomedov, were forced to withdraw from the fight due to visa issues, thus the UFC matched Meerschaert and Stoltzfus against each other for the event. He lost the bout via rear-naked choke in the third round.

Stoltzfus faced Dwight Grant on July 16, 2022, at UFC on ABC 3. He won the fight via unanimous decision.

Stoltzfus faced Abusupiyan Magomedov, replacing injured Makhmud Muradov, on September 3, 2022, at UFC Fight Night 209. He lost the fight via knockout in 19 seconds.

Stoltzfus faced Punahele Soriano on December 2, 2023, at UFC on ESPN 52. He won the bout by second round rear-naked choke submission. This fight earned him the Performance of the Night award.

Stoltzfus faced Brunno Ferreira on June 8, 2024 at UFC on ESPN 57. He lost the fight via technical knockout due to a spinning back elbow.

Stoltzfus faced Marc-André Barriault on November 2, 2024 at UFC Fight Night 246. He won the fight via knockout in the first round. This fight earned him another Performance of the Night award.

Stoltzfus faced Nursulton Ruziboev on May 17, 2025 at UFC Fight Night 256. He lost the fight by unanimous decision.

Stoltzfus faced former interim UFC Middleweight Championship challenger Kelvin Gastelum on September 13, 2025 at UFC Fight Night 259. At the weigh-ins, Gastelum weighed in at 191 pounds, five pounds over the middleweight non-title fight limit. The bout proceeded at catchweight and Gastelum was fined 35 percent of his purse which went to Stoltzfus. Stoltzfus lost the fight by unanimous decision.

Stoltzfus faced Mansur Abdul-Malik on August 15, 2026 at UFC 330. He won the fight via a rear-naked choke submission in the second round. This fight earned him a $100,000 Performance of the Night award.

== Professional kickboxing ==
Stoltzfus faced Sebastian Cozmâncă, on February 23, 2018, at Colosseum Tournament 5. He lost the fight via knockout in the first round.

== Championships and accomplishments ==
- Ultimate Fighting Championship
  - Performance of the Night (Three times) vs. Punahele Soriano, Marc-André Barriault and Mansur Abdul-Malik
- We Love MMA
  - WLMMA Middleweight Championship (One time)
    - Two successful title defenses

== Mixed martial arts record ==
Professional record breakdown
25 matches	17 wins	8 losses
By knockout	3	2
By submission	7	2
By decision	6	4
By disqualification	1	0

Res.	Record	Opponent	Method	Event	Date	Round	Time	Location	Notes
Win	17–8	Mansur Abdul-Malik	Submission (rear-naked choke)	UFC 330	August 15, 2026	2	4:25	Philadelphia, Pennsylvania, United States	Performance of the Night.
Loss	16–8	Kelvin Gastelum	Decision (unanimous)	UFC Fight Night: Lopes vs. Silva	September 13, 2025	3	5:00	San Antonio, Texas, United States	Catchweight (191 lb) bout; Gastelum missed weight.
Loss	16–7	Nursulton Ruziboev	Decision (unanimous)	UFC Fight Night: Burns vs. Morales	May 17, 2025	3	5:00	Las Vegas, Nevada, United States	
Win	16–6	Marc-André Barriault	KO (punches)	UFC Fight Night: Moreno vs. Albazi	November 2, 2024	1	4:28	Edmonton, Alberta, Canada	Performance of the Night.
Loss	15–6	Brunno Ferreira	KO (spinning back elbow)	UFC on ESPN: Cannonier vs. Imavov	June 8, 2024	1	4:51	Louisville, Kentucky, United States	
Win	15–5	Punahele Soriano	Submission (rear-naked choke)	UFC on ESPN: Dariush vs. Tsarukyan	December 2, 2023	2	4:10	Austin, Texas, United States	Performance of the Night.
Loss	14–5	Abusupiyan Magomedov	TKO (front kick and punches)	UFC Fight Night: Gane vs. Tuivasa	September 3, 2022	1	0:19	Paris, France	
Win	14–4	Dwight Grant	Decision (unanimous)	UFC on ABC: Ortega vs. Rodríguez	July 16, 2022	3	5:00	Elmont, New York, United States	
Loss	13–4	Gerald Meerschaert	Submission (rear-naked choke)	UFC Fight Night: Lewis vs. Daukaus	December 18, 2021	3	2:59	Las Vegas, Nevada, United States	
Loss	13–3	Rodolfo Vieira	Submission (rear-naked choke)	UFC on ESPN: Makhachev vs. Moisés	July 17, 2021	3	1:54	Las Vegas, Nevada, United States	
Loss	13–2	Kyle Daukaus	Decision (unanimous)	UFC 255	November 21, 2020	3	5:00	Las Vegas, Nevada, United States	
Win	13–1	Joe Pyfer	TKO (elbow injury)	Dana White's Contender Series 28	August 11, 2020	1	4:21	Las Vegas, Nevada, United States	
Win	12–1	Nihad Nasufovic	Submission (twister)	German MMA Championship 23	November 9, 2019	3	3:33	Oberhausen, Germany	
Win	11–1	Jonas Billstein	KO (punches)	German MMA Championship 20	June 29, 2019	2	1:39	Berlin, Germany	
Win	10–1	Filip Zadruzynski	Submission (guillotine choke)	We Love MMA 44	December 8, 2018	1	2:21	Berlin, Germany	Defended the WLMMA Middleweight Championship.
Win	9–1	Roman Kapranov	Submission (rear-naked choke)	We Love MMA 39	April 7, 2018	1	2:37	Ludwigshafen, Germany	Defended the WLMMA Middleweight Championship.
Win	8–1	Selim Agaev	Decision (unanimous)	Fair FC 7	October 7, 2017	3	5:00	Bochum, Germany	
Win	7–1	Mario Wittmann	Submission (rear-naked choke)	We Love MMA 30	April 22, 2017	1	4:36	Ludwigshafen, Germany	Won the WLMMA Middleweight Championship.
Win	6–1	David Moscatelli	Decision (unanimous)	We Love MMA 26	November 26, 2016	3	5:00	Basel, Switzerland	
Win	5–1	Eugen Weber	Submission (kneebar)	We Love MMA 17	November 28, 2015	1	1:45	Stuttgart, Germany	
Win	4–1	Arda Adas	DQ (illegal soccer kicks)	We Love MMA 15	July 4, 2015	2	N/A	Berlin, Germany	
Loss	3–1	Christian Skorzik	Decision (unanimous)	Fair FC 3	March 28, 2015	3	5:00	Herne, Germany	Light Heavyweight bout.
Win	3–0	Abu Dzhamaldaev	Decision (unanimous)	Age of Cage 4	January 30, 2015	3	5:00	Stuttgart, Germany	Middleweight debut.
Win	2–0	Rasul Alautdinov	Decision (unanimous)	We Love MMA 11	December 20, 2014	2	5:00	Berlin, Germany	
Win	1–0	Kiril Kolomeitsev	Decision (split)	We Love MMA 10	November 8, 2014	2	5:00	Stuttgart, Germany	Light Heavyweight debut.

== Kickboxing record (incomplete) ==
Kickboxing record (Incomplete)
13 wins, 3 losses
Date	Result	Opponent	Event	Location	Method	Round	Time
2018-02-23	Loss	(Romania) Sebastian Cozmâncă	Colosseum Tournament 5	Galați, Romania	KO (left hook)	1	1:26
Legend: Win Loss Draw/No contest Notes

== See also ==
- List of current UFC fighters
- List of Dana White's Contender Series alumni
- List of male mixed martial artists
- List of male kickboxers
