= Abusupiyan Magomedov =

Russian-German mixed martial artist (born 1990)

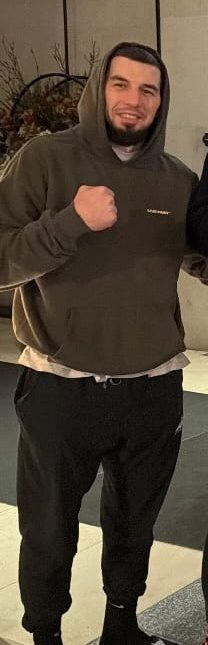
- Magomedov in 2026
- Born: Abusupiyan Magomedov Khydyvov; September 2, 1990 (age 36); Argun, Checheno-Ingush ASSR, Russian SFSR, Soviet Union
- Other names: Abus
- Nationality: German
- Height: 6 ft 2 in (1.88 m)
- Weight: 185 lb (84 kg; 13 st 3 lb)
- Division: Welterweight (2010–2015); Middleweight (2016–present)
- Reach: 78 in (198 cm)
- Fighting out of: Düsseldorf, North Rhine-Westphalia, Germany
- Team: UFD Gym
- Years active: 2010–present

Mixed martial arts record
- Total: 38
- Wins: 30
- By knockout: 14
- By submission: 9
- By decision: 7
- Losses: 7
- By knockout: 2
- By submission: 3
- By decision: 2
- Draws: 1

Other information
- Mixed martial arts record from Sherdog

Abusupiyan Magomedov Khydyvov (born September 2, 1990) is a Russian-born German mixed martial artist. He currently competes in the middleweight division of the Ultimate Fighting Championship. He previously competed in Professional Fighters League, Konfrontacja Sztuk Walki and Final Fight Championship. As of October 24, 2026, he is #9 in the Meta UFC middleweight rankings.

== Background ==
Magomedov was born in Argun, Soviet Union (now Russia) into a Kumyk family. He trained in wrestling from childhood. The martial arts tradition in Dagestan and a personal affinity led him to dedicate himself to the sport. At the age of fifteen, he moved to Germany with his family. It wasn't a preferred move, but a necessary one. His mother suffered from an illness that could not be properly treated in his homeland, after she recovered from her illness, the family decided to stay permanently. In his new home, Magomedov expanded his martial arts skills by training in kickboxing, among other disciplines. At the age of twenty, he made his mixed martial arts (MMA) debut.

== Mixed martial arts career ==
=== Early career ===
During the 2010–2017, Magomedov completing in regional Germany promotion. Magomedov has also fought with potential future UFC fighters Jessin Ayari and Andreas Stahl. He amassed a record of 19–3 record before signed with Professional Fighters League.

=== Professional Fighters League ===
On his way to the tournament playoffs, Magomedov faced Danillo Villefort on July 5, 2018, at PFL 3. He won the fight via technical knockout in round one. The second bout, Magomedov faced Anderson Gonçalves on August 16, 2018, at PFL 6. He won the fight via knockout in round one.

The quarterfinal and semifinal bout took place on October 20, 2018, at PFL 10, Magomedov faced Gasan Umalatov in the quarterfinal and the bout ended via majority draw, but he advanced to the semifinals via first-round tiebreaker. Therefore, Magomedov faced Sadibou Sy in the semifinal and he won the fight via unanimous decision.

In the final, Magomedov faced Louis Taylor on December 31, 2018, at PFL 11. He lost the fight via knockout in round one.

=== Post-PFL and Konfrontacja Sztuk Walki ===
In his first bout since loss, Magomedov faced Slaviša Simeunović at Elite MMA Championship 3 on May 4, 2019, and won the fight via a kimura in round one.

In July 2019, Magomedov signed with Konfrontacja Sztuk Walki.

Due to health issues problems and the COVID-19 pandemic meant that his debut took place only a year later. Magomedov faced undefeated Cezary Kęsik on December 19, 2020, at KSW 57. He won the fight in round two after choking Kęsik unconscious via a guillotine choke.

In July 2021, Magomedov announced via social media that he was no longer on the KSW roster.

=== Ultimate Fighting Championship ===
On August 6, 2021, Magomedov signed with the Ultimate Fighting Championship (UFC).

Magomedov was scheduled to face Gerald Meerschaert on December 18, 2021, at UFC Fight Night 199. However, Magomedov was forced to pull from the event due to visa issue and was replaced by Dustin Stoltzfus.

Magomedov was scheduled to face Joaquin Buckley on June 4, 2022, at UFC Fight Night 207. However, the bout was cancelled for unknown reasons.

Magomedov was scheduled to face Aliaskhab Khizriev on March 26, 2022, at UFC on ESPN 33. However, Magomedov pulled out for unknown reasons and was replaced by Denis Tiuliulin.

In his promotional debut, Magomedov was scheduled to face Makhmud Muradov on September 3, 2022, at UFC Fight Night 209. However, Muradov withdrew due to injury was replaced by Dustin Stoltzfus. He won the fight via technical knockout in a 19 second of round one. This win earned him the Performance of the Night award.

The bout with Gerald Meerschaert was scheduled for February 18, 2023, at UFC Fight Night 219. However, Magomedov once again pulled out due to visa issues and the bout was scrapped.

The bout between Magomedov and Muradov was scheduled on March 11, 2023, at UFC Fight Night 221. However at the end of February, it was announced that Muradov had pulled out of the bout again.

Magomedov faced Sean Strickland in the main event on July 1, 2023, at UFC on ESPN 48. He lost the fight via technical knockout in round two.

Replacing Nursulton Ruziboev, who withdrew for unknown reasons, Magomedov faced Caio Borralho on November 4, 2023, at UFC Fight Night 231. He lost the fight via unanimous decision.

Magomedov faced Warlley Alves on May 18, 2024, at UFC Fight Night 241. He won the fight via unanimous decision.

Magomedov faced Brunno Ferreira on October 26, 2024, at UFC 308. He won the fight via arm-triangle choke in round three.

Magomedov faced Michel Pereira on April 26, 2025, at UFC on ESPN 66. He won the fight via unanimous decision.

Magomedov faced Joe Pyfer on October 4, 2025, at UFC 320. He lost the fight via a face crank submission in the second round.

Magomedov faced Michał Oleksiejczuk on June 28, 2026 at UFC Fight Night 280. The bout was initially reported as the main event, but was changed for undisclosed reasons. Magomedov won the fight via guillotine choke in round one.

Magomedov faced Cameron Rowston on October 24, 2026 at UFC 333. He won the fight via guillotine submission in round one.

== Championships and accomplishments ==
- Ultimate Fighting Championship
  - Performance of the Night (One time) vs. Dustin Stoltzfus
- Superior Fighting Championship
  - Superior FC Welterweight Championship (One time)
  - Superior FC Middleweight Championship (One time)
- German MMA Championship
  - GMC Welterweight Championship (One time)

== Mixed martial arts record ==
Professional record breakdown
| 38 matches | 30 wins | 7 losses |
| By knockout | 14 | 2 |
| By submission | 9 | 3 |
| By decision | 7 | 2 |
| Draws | 1 | |

| Res. | Record | Opponent | Method | Event | Date | Round | Time | Location | Notes |
|---|---|---|---|---|---|---|---|---|---|
| Win | 30–7–1 | Cameron Rowston | Technical Submission (guillotine choke) | UFC 333 | October 24, 2026 | 1 | 1:44 | Abu Dhabi, United Arab Emirates | |
| Win | 29–7–1 | Michał Oleksiejczuk | Submission (guillotine choke) | UFC Fight Night: Fiziev vs. Torres | June 27, 2026 | 1 | 3:25 | Baku, Azerbaijan | |
| Loss | 28–7–1 | Joe Pyfer | Submission (face crank) | UFC 320 | October 4, 2025 | 2 | 1:46 | Las Vegas, Nevada, United States | |
| Win | 28–6–1 | Michel Pereira | Decision (unanimous) | UFC on ESPN: Machado Garry vs. Prates | April 26, 2025 | 3 | 5:00 | Kansas City, Missouri, United States | |
| Win | 27–6–1 | Brunno Ferreira | Submission (arm-triangle choke) | UFC 308 | October 26, 2024 | 3 | 3:14 | Abu Dhabi, United Arab Emirates | |
| Win | 26–6–1 | Warlley Alves | Decision (unanimous) | UFC Fight Night: Barboza vs. Murphy | May 18, 2024 | 3 | 5:00 | Las Vegas, Nevada, United States | |
| Loss | 25–6–1 | Caio Borralho | Decision (unanimous) | UFC Fight Night: Almeida vs. Lewis | November 4, 2023 | 3 | 5:00 | São Paulo, Brazil | |
| Loss | 25–5–1 | Sean Strickland | TKO (punches) | UFC on ESPN: Strickland vs. Magomedov | July 1, 2023 | 2 | 4:20 | Las Vegas, Nevada, United States | |
| Win | 25–4–1 | Dustin Stoltzfus | TKO (front kick and punches) | UFC Fight Night: Gane vs. Tuivasa | September 3, 2022 | 1 | 0:19 | Paris, France | Performance of the Night. |
| Win | 24–4–1 | Cezariusz Kęsik | Technical Submission (guillotine choke) | KSW 57 | December 19, 2020 | 2 | 1:52 | Łódź, Poland | Submission of the Night. |
| Win | 23–4–1 | Slaviša Simeunović | Submission (kimura) | Elite MMA Championship 3 | May 4, 2019 | 1 | 0:47 | Düsseldorf, Germany | |
| Loss | 22–4–1 | Louis Taylor | KO (punch) | PFL 11 (2018) | December 31, 2018 | 1 | 0:33 | New York City, New York, United States | 2018 PFL Middleweight Tournament Final. |
| Win | 22–3–1 | Sadibou Sy | Decision (unanimous) | PFL 10 (2018) | October 20, 2018 | 2 | 5:00 | Washington, D.C., United States | 2018 PFL Middleweight Tournament Semifinal. |
| Draw | 21–3–1 | Gasan Umalatov | Draw (majority) | PFL 10 (2018) | October 20, 2018 | 2 | 5:00 | Washington, D.C., United States | 2018 PFL Middleweight Tournament Quarterfinal. Advances via first round tiebreaker. |
| Win | 21–3 | Anderson Gonçalves | KO (punches) | PFL 6 (2018) | August 16, 2018 | 1 | 1:27 | Atlantic City, New Jersey, United States | |
| Win | 20–3 | Danillo Villefort | TKO (front kick to the body and punches) | PFL 3 (2018) | July 5, 2018 | 1 | 3:37 | Washington, D.C., United States | |
| Win | 19–3 | Dan Hope | TKO (punches) | Superior FC 18 | September 16, 2017 | 1 | 2:15 | Ludwigshafen, Germany | Won the vacant Superior FC Middleweight Championship. |
| Win | 18–3 | Sergio Souza | Submission (guillotine choke) | Final Fight Championship 29 | April 22, 2017 | 1 | 1:20 | Ljubljana, Slovenia | Catchweight (198 lb) bout. |
| Win | 17–3 | Aires Benrois | Submission (guillotine choke) | Superior FC 16 | March 11, 2017 | 2 | 2:51 | Darmstadt, Germany | |
| Win | 16–3 | Mathias Schuck | TKO (punch and elbow) | Superior FC 15 | October 29, 2016 | 1 | 0:53 | Rüsselsheim am Main, Germany | |
| Win | 15–3 | Ivica Trušček | Submission (rear-naked choke) | Final Fight Championship 26 | September 23, 2016 | 2 | 4:50 | Linz, Austria | Catchweight (174 lb) bout. |
| Win | 14–3 | Raymond Jarman | TKO (punches) | Superior FC 14 | May 21, 2016 | 1 | N/A | Düren, Germany | Middleweight debut. |
| Loss | 13–3 | Mikkel Parlo | Decision (unanimous) | German MMA Championship 7 | November 7, 2015 | 3 | 5:00 | Castrop-Rauxel, Germany | Catchweight (181 lb) bout. |
| Win | 13–2 | Manuel Garcia | TKO (punches and knee) | Merseburger Fight Night 8 | October 30, 2015 | 1 | 0:40 | Spergau, Germany | |
| Win | 12–2 | Josip Artuković | TKO (kick to the body and punches) | Mix Fight Gala 18 | June 5, 2015 | 1 | 1:10 | Fulda, Germany | |
| Win | 11–2 | Donovan Panayiotis | TKO (punches) | German MMA Championship 6 | April 18, 2015 | 1 | 0:56 | Castrop-Rauxel, Germany | |
| Win | 10–2 | Rafał Błachuta | Decision (unanimous) | German MMA Championship 5 | September 13, 2014 | 5 | 5:00 | Castrop-Rauxel, Germany | |
| Loss | 9–2 | Rafał Moks | Submission (guillotine choke) | German MMA Championship 4 | July 6, 2013 | 1 | 2:53 | Herne, Germany | Lost the GMC Welterweight Championship. |
| Win | 9–1 | Andreas Birgels | TKO (punches) | Superior FC 13 | June 1, 2013 | 1 | 4:44 | Hamburg, Germany | Won the Superior FC Welterweight Championship. |
| Loss | 8–1 | Andreas Stahl | Submission (rear-naked choke) | Heroes Fighting | March 23, 2013 | 2 | N/A | Halmstad, Sweden | |
| Win | 8–0 | Jessin Ayari | TKO (punches) | German MMA Championship 3 | February 16, 2013 | 1 | 1:49 | Herne, Germany | Won the vacant GMC Welterweight Championship. |
| Win | 7–0 | David Rosmon | Decision (unanimous) | European MMA 1 | September 15, 2012 | 3 | 5:00 | Copenhagen, Denmark | |
| Win | 6–0 | Gocha Smoyan | TKO (doctor stoppage) | Superior FC 7 | November 26, 2011 | 2 | 0:15 | Düren, Germany | |
| Win | 5–0 | Bjorn Corsis | TKO (doctor stoppage) | Superior FC 6 | September 17, 2011 | 2 | 1:28 | Karlsruhe, Germany | |
| Win | 4–0 | Igor Montes | Decision (unanimous) | Mix Fight Gala 11 | November 27, 2010 | 2 | 5:00 | Sindelfingen, Germany | |
| Win | 3–0 | Fahd Jahri | Decision (unanimous) | Kiru: In the Spirit of the Knights | May 29, 2010 | 2 | 5:00 | Bitburg, Germany | |
| Win | 2–0 | Sjobbe Clymans | TKO (punches) | Outsider Cup: Cage Fight Night 7 | April 17, 2010 | 1 | 0:38 | Koblenz, Germany | |
| Win | 1–0 | Nicola di Loreto | Submission (guillotine choke) | Outsider Cup: Cage Fight Night 6 | February 26, 2010 | 1 | 0:30 | Bielefeld, Germany | Welterweight debut. |

== See also ==
- List of current UFC fighters
- List of male mixed martial artists
