= Jack Marshman =

Welsh mixed martial arts fighter

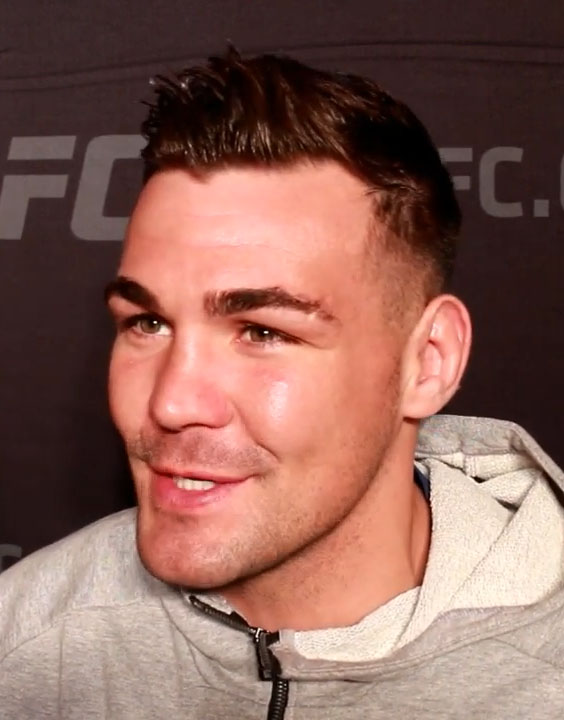
- Jack Marshman at UFC 230
- Born: 19 December 1989 (age 36); Abertillery, Wales
- Other names: Hammer
- Height: 6 ft 0 in (1.83 m)
- Weight: 185 lb (84 kg; 13 st 3 lb)
- Division: Middleweight
- Reach: 73 in (185 cm)
- Fighting out of: Abertillery, Wales
- Team: Tillery Combat MMA Academy
- Rank: Purple belt in Brazilian Jiu-Jitsu
- Years active: 2010–2020

Mixed martial arts record
- Total: 33
- Wins: 23
- By knockout: 13
- By submission: 5
- By decision: 5
- Losses: 10
- By knockout: 4
- By submission: 2
- By decision: 4

Other information
- Occupation: Paratrooper
- Mixed martial arts record from Sherdog

Jack Marshman (born 19 December 1989) is a retired Welsh professional mixed martial artist who competed in the Middleweight division. A professional competitor since 2010, he has competed for Ultimate Fighting Championship (UFC), BAMMA and Cage Warriors. He is the former BAMMA Lonsdale Middleweight Champion and former Cage Warriors Middleweight Champion.

== Background ==
Marshman started training MMA when he was 15 when his dad introduced him to his friend who is a mixed martial arts (MMA) coach, Richard Shore. After the first MMA training session, Marshman was instantly hooked and spent much of his time in the gym there after. He claimed that learning MMA taught him to stay out of troubles in his teenage life.

Marshman joined the army at the age of 17. He served as a Lance Corporal with The 3rd Battalion, The Parachute Regiment, for 10 years, where he was deployed to Afghanistan. He serves as a Paratrooper while fighting MMA professionally. He believed his military service helped him to develop the physical and mental toughness and self-discipline which would help him in his MMA career.

== Mixed martial arts career ==
=== Early career ===
Marshman fought in the European circuit and he was the Middleweight Cage Warriors Fighting Championship (CWFC) Champion He amassed a record of 20-5 prior joining UFC. Marshman was the first Welshman signed by UFC.

=== Ultimate Fighting Championship ===
Marshman made his UFC debut on 19 November 2016 at UFC Fight Night: Mousasi vs. Hall 2. He faced Magnus Cedenblad and won his first UFC win via TKO one round two.

On 19 February 2017 Marshman faced Thiago Santos at UFC Fight Night: Lewis vs. Browne. Marshman came out aggressively on round one but he was dropped to the floor on round two after he was hit by Santos's spinning wheel kick and followed by a series of striking to his face and lost the fight via a TKO.

Marshman faced Ryan Janes at UFC Fight Night: Nelson vs. Ponzinibbio on 16 July 2017. He won the fight via unanimous decision.

Marshman faced Antônio Carlos Júnior on 28 October 2017 at UFC Fight Night 119. He lost the fight via submission.

Marshman was expected to face Elizeu Zaleski dos Santos on 17 March 2018 at UFC Fight Night 127. However, on 19 February 2018 it was announced that Zaleski was pulled from the event, citing knee injury. He was replaced by Brad Scott. Subsequently, Marshman was removed from the card two days before the event for medical issues surrounding his weight cut and his fight with Scott was scrapped.

Marshman faced Karl Roberson on 3 November 2018 at UFC 230. He lost the fight via unanimous decision.

Marshman faced John Phillips on 16 March 2019 at UFC Fight Night 147 At the weigh-ins, Marshman weighed in at 188 lbs, 2 pounds over the middleweight non-title fight limit of 186 lbs. He was fined 20% of his fight purse and the bout proceeded at catchweight. Marshman won the bout via split decision. Marshman received a formal warning from the military due to participating in the fight week against orders.

Marshman faced Edmen Shahbazyan on 6 July 2019 at UFC 239. He lost the fight via a rear-naked choke submission in the first round.

Marshman was scheduled to face Markus Perez on 16 November 2019 at UFC Fight Night 164. However, Marshman was pulled from the event for undisclosed reason and he was replaced by Wellington Turman.

Marshman was expected to face Kevin Holland 21 March 2020 at UFC Fight Night: Woodley vs. Edwards. However, due to COVID-19 pandemic, the event was cancelled.

Mashman faced Sean Strickland, replacing Wellington Turman, on 31 October 2020 at UFC Fight Night 181. At the weight-ins, Marshman weighed in at 187.5 pounds, one and a half pounds over the middleweight non-title fight limit. The bout proceeded at catchweight and Marshman was fined a percentage of his purses, which went to Strickland. Marshman lost the fight via unanimous decision.

Since the loss, Marshman has retired from MMA.

== Championships and accomplishments ==
=== Mixed martial arts ===
- Cage Warrior Fighting Championship (CWFC)
  - Cage Warrior Fighting Championship Middleweight Championship (One time) vs. Christopher Jacquelin
- BAMMA Championship
  - BAMMA Lonsdale Middleweight Championship (One time) vs. Leeroy Barnes
- Made4TheCage Fighting Championships (M4TC)
  - Made4TheCage Middleweight Championship (One time) vs. Kyle Redfearn
- Ultimate Fighting Championship
  - Performance of the Night (One time) vs. Magnus Cedenblad

== Mixed martial arts record ==
Professional record breakdown
| 33 matches | 23 wins | 10 losses |
| By knockout | 13 | 4 |
| By submission | 5 | 2 |
| By decision | 5 | 4 |

| Res. | Record | Opponent | Method | Event | Date | Round | Time | Location | Notes |
|---|---|---|---|---|---|---|---|---|---|
| Loss | 23–10 | Sean Strickland | Decision (unanimous) | UFC Fight Night: Hall vs. Silva | 31 October 2020 | 3 | 5:00 | Las Vegas, Nevada, United States | Catchweight (187.5 lb) bout; Marshman missed weight. |
| Loss | 23–9 | Edmen Shahbazyan | Submission (rear-naked choke) | UFC 239 | 6 July 2019 | 1 | 1:12 | Las Vegas, Nevada, United States | |
| Win | 23–8 | John Phillips | Decision (split) | UFC Fight Night: Till vs. Masvidal | 16 March 2019 | 3 | 5:00 | London, England | Catchweight (188 lb) bout; Marshman missed weight. |
| Loss | 22–8 | Karl Roberson | Decision (unanimous) | UFC 230 | 3 November 2018 | 3 | 5:00 | New York City, New York, United States | |
| Loss | 22–7 | Antônio Carlos Júnior | Submission (rear-naked choke) | UFC Fight Night: Brunson vs. Machida | 28 October 2017 | 1 | 4:30 | São Paulo, Brazil | |
| Win | 22–6 | Ryan Janes | Decision (unanimous) | UFC Fight Night: Nelson vs. Ponzinibbio | 16 July 2017 | 3 | 5:00 | Glasgow, Scotland | |
| Loss | 21–6 | Thiago Santos | TKO (spinning wheel kick and punches) | UFC Fight Night: Lewis vs. Browne | 19 February 2017 | 2 | 2:21 | Halifax, Nova Scotia, Canada | |
| Win | 21–5 | Magnus Cedenblad | TKO (punches) | UFC Fight Night: Mousasi vs. Hall 2 | 19 November 2016 | 2 | 3:32 | Belfast, Northern Ireland | Performance of the Night. |
| Win | 20–5 | Christopher Jacquelin | TKO (punch) | CWFC 77 | 8 July 2016 | 2 | 3:32 | London, England | Won the vacant Cage Warriors Middleweight Championship. |
| Win | 19–5 | Ali Arish | Submission (guillotine choke) | CWFC 76 | 4 June 2016 | 1 | 4:58 | Newport, Wales | |
| Win | 18–5 | Shaun Lomas | Submission (rear-naked choke) | Pain Pit Fight Night 15 | 5 March 2016 | 1 | 3:45 | Ebbw Vale, Wales | |
| Win | 17–5 | Kyle Redfearn | Decision (majority) | M4tC 18 | 28 September 2015 | 2 | 1:50 | Newcastle, England | Won the vacant M4tC Middleweight Championship. |
| Win | 16–5 | Che Mills | TKO (punches) | CWFC 72 | 13 September 2014 | 3 | 5:00 | Newport, Wales | |
| Win | 15–5 | Bola Omoyele | Submission (armbar) | CWFC 69 | 7 June 2014 | 2 | 1:32 | London, England | |
| Loss | 14–5 | Abu Azaitar | TKO (punches) | CWFC: Fight Night 10 | 28 March 2014 | 1 | 4:51 | Amman, Jordan | |
| Win | 14–4 | Alex Minogue | Decision (unanimous) | Extreme Cage Championships: Banned 2 | 14 December 2013 | 3 | 5:00 | Manchester, England | |
| Win | 13–4 | Simas Norkus | TKO (punches) | Pain Pit Fight Night 9 | 2 November 2013 | 2 | 1:19 | Newport, Wales | |
| Loss | 12–4 | Ion Pascu | KO (punches) | BAMMA 13 | 14 September 2013 | 1 | 4:02 | Birmingham, England | |
| Loss | 12–3 | Scott Askham | Decision (unanimous) | Ultimate Cage Fighting Championships 5 | 27 July 2013 | 3 | 5:00 | Doncaster, England | For the UCFC Middleweight Championship. |
| Win | 12–2 | Wayne Cole | TKO (punches) | GWC: The British Invasion: U.S. vs. U.K. | 29 June 2013 | 1 | 1:26 | Kansas City, Missouri, United States | |
| Loss | 11–2 | Xavier Foupa-Pokam | Decision (split) | BAMMA 11 | 1 December 2012 | 3 | 5:00 | Birmingham, England | |
| Win | 11–1 | Andrew Punshon | Submission (triangle choke) | BAMMA 10 | 15 September 2012 | 1 | 2:31 | London, England | For the vacant BAMMA British Middleweight Championship; Marshman missed weight (187.2 lb) and was ineligible to win the title. |
| Loss | 10–1 | Tom Watson | TKO (elbows) | BAMMA 9 | 24 March 2012 | 2 | 4:50 | Birmingham, England | For the BAMMA World Middleweight Championship. Lost the BAMMA British Middleweight Championship. |
| Win | 10–0 | Leeroy Barnes | Decision (unanimous) | BAMMA 8 | 10 December 2011 | 3 | 5:00 | Nottingham, England | Defended the BAMMA British Middleweight Championship. |
| Win | 9–0 | Carl Noon | TKO (punches) | BAMMA 7 | 10 September 2011 | 3 | 2:09 | Birmingham, England | Won the inaugural BAMMA British Middleweight Championship. |
| Win | 8–0 | Mike Ling | Submission (armbar) | Shock n' Awe 8 | 23 July 2011 | 1 | N/A | Portsmouth, England | Won the Shock n' Awe Middleweight Championship. |
| Win | 7–0 | Lee Chadwick | TKO (punhes) | Olympian MMA Championships 10 | 4 June 2011 | 1 | 1:37 | Liverpool, England | |
| Win | 6–0 | Kevin Reed | KO (punch) | Valley of Kings 1 | 7 May 2011 | 1 | 2:59 | Cardiff, Wales | |
| Win | 5–0 | Kevin Reed | TKO (punches) | Ready To Rage 2 | 19 June 2010 | 1 | 0:00 | Newport, Wales | |
| Win | 4–0 | Paul Jenkins | TKO (punches) | Samurai Fight Night 1 | 8 May 2010 | 2 | 0:00 | Abertillery, Wales | |
| Win | 3–0 | Leonardo Queiroz | TKO (punches) | Spartan Fight Challenge 3 | 20 March 2010 | 2 | 0:00 | Newport, Wales | |
| Win | 2–0 | Andrew Cochran | TKO (punches) | KnuckleUp MMA 4 | 20 February 2010 | 1 | 1:51 | Cheltenham, England | |
| Win | 1–0 | Karim Mammar | TKO (injury) | Ready to Rage 1 | 31 January 2010 | 2 | 0:43 | Newport, Wales | |

== See also ==
- List of male mixed martial artists
