= UFC Fight Night: Lewis vs. Browne =

UFC mixed martial arts event in 2017

- The poster for UFC Fight Night: Lewis vs. Browne
- Promotion: Ultimate Fighting Championship
- Date: February 19, 2017
- Venue: Scotiabank Centre
- City: Halifax, Nova Scotia, Canada
- Attendance: 8,123
- Total gate: $575,832

Event chronology
UFC 208: Holm vs. de Randamie	UFC Fight Night: Lewis vs. Browne	UFC 209: Woodley vs. Thompson 2

UFC Fight Night: Lewis vs. Browne (also known as UFC Fight Night 105) was a mixed martial arts event promoted by the Ultimate Fighting Championship held on February 19, 2017, at Scotiabank Centre in Halifax, Nova Scotia, Canada.

== Background ==
The event was the second that the promotion hosted in Nova Scotia, and the first since UFC Fight Night: MacDonald vs. Saffiedine in October 2014.

A heavyweight bout between former UFC Heavyweight Champion Junior dos Santos and longtime divisional contender Stefan Struve was originally expected to headline the event. The pairing met once before in February 2009 at UFC 95, where Dos Santos defeated Struve (who was making his UFC debut) via TKO in the first round. However, on January 12, Struve pulled out due to a shoulder injury. Despite having over six weeks before the event, promotion officials elected to remove Dos Santos.

Nearly two weeks later, it was announced that the new headliner would be a heavyweight matchup between Derrick Lewis and Travis Browne. The bout was scheduled to take place at UFC 208, but was moved a week later to headline this event.

Álvaro Herrera was expected to face Alessandro Ricci at the event. However, Herrera pulled out of the fight in mid-January citing injury and was replaced by Paul Felder.

Former UFC Women's Bantamweight Championship challenger Liz Carmouche was expected to face 2004 Olympic silver medalist in wrestling and fellow title challenger Sara McMann at the event, but pulled out on February 2. She was replaced by promotional newcomer Gina Mazany.

Michel Quiñones was expected to face Alexander Volkanovski at the event, but Volkanovski announced on February 13 that the bout was scrapped due to Quiñones being injured and no replacement being found.

At the weigh-ins, Mazany came in at 139.5 lb, 3.5 lb over the women's bantamweight limit of 136 lb. As a result, she was fined 20% of her purse, which went to McMann and the bout proceeded as scheduled at catchweight.

== Results ==
Main Card (Fox Sports 1)
Weight class				Method	Round	Time	Notes
Heavyweight	Derrick Lewis	def.	Travis Browne	KO (punches)	2	3:12
Middleweight	Johny Hendricks	def.	Héctor Lombard	Decision (unanimous) (30–27, 30–27, 29–28)	3	5:00
Featherweight	Gavin Tucker	def.	Sam Sicilia	Decision (unanimous) (30–27, 30–27, 30–27)	3	5:00
Middleweight	Elias Theodorou	def.	Cezar Ferreira	Decision (unanimous) (30–27, 29–28, 29–28)	3	5:00
Catchweight (139.5 lb)	Sara McMann	def.	Gina Mazany	Submission (arm-triangle choke)	1	1:14
Lightweight	Paul Felder	def.	Alessandro Ricci	TKO (elbow and punches)	1	4:44
Preliminary Card (Fox Sports 1)
Welterweight	Santiago Ponzinibbio	def.	Nordine Taleb	Decision (unanimous) (29–28, 29–28, 29–28)	3	5:00
Women's Strawweight	Randa Markos	def.	Carla Esparza	Decision (split) (28–29, 29–28, 29–28)	3	5:00
Bantamweight	Aiemann Zahabi	def.	Reginaldo Vieira	Decision (unanimous) (30–27, 29–28, 29–28)	3	5:00
Middleweight	Thiago Santos	def.	Jack Marshman	TKO (spinning heel kick and punches)	2	2:21
Preliminary Card (UFC Fight Pass)
Middleweight	Gerald Meerschaert	def.	Ryan Janes	Submission (armbar)	1	1:34

== Bonus awards ==
The following fighters were awarded $50,000 bonuses:

- Fight of the Night: Derrick Lewis vs. Travis Browne
- Performance of the Night: Paul Felder and Thiago Santos

== See also ==
- List of UFC events
- 2017 in UFC
