= Roufusport =

Martial arts gym in Milwaukee, Wisconsin, US

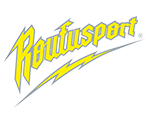
- Est.: 2006; 20 years ago
- Founded by: Duke Roufus
- Primary owners: Duke Roufus; Scott Joffe; Anthony Pettis
- Primary trainers: Duke Roufus; Scott Cushman
- Past titleholders: Belal Muhammad; Anthony Pettis; Tyron Woodley; Jens Pulver; Rose Namajunas; Ben Askren; Sergio Pettis
- Training facilities: Milwaukee, Wisconsin, U.S.
- Website: roufusport.com

Roufusport (also known as Roufusport MMA Academy) is a mixed martial arts gym based in Milwaukee, Wisconsin. Known as one of the top gyms in MMA, it has produced former UFC champions, Belal Muhammad (former UFC Welterweight Champion), Anthony Pettis (former UFC Lightweight Champion) Tyron Woodley (former UFC Welterweight Champion) and Rose Namajunas (former UFC Women's Strawweight Champion).

== Background ==
Duke Roufus is a former professional kickboxer who retired in 2002. In 1993 he founded Roufusport in his dad's Milwaukee based martial arts school's basement.

Roufusport has grown into a leading MMA gym. Four of its fighters have gone on to become UFC champions while training with Roufusport: Rose Namajunas, Belal Muhammad, Anthony Pettis and Tyron Woodley.

On October 17, 2025, Roufus passed away in his sleep at the age of 55.

== Controversy over the death of Dennis Munson Jr. ==
On March 28, 2014, Dennis Munson Jr., an amateur kickboxer from Roufus' gym, Roufusport, died after taking part in a bout promoted by Roufus. The bout took place in Milwaukee, Wisconsin, where the fighters were not required to wear protective headgear. Munson's recorded cause of death by the Milwaukee County medical examiner was head trauma. Dehydration caused by the fighter cutting weight up to and including the day of the fight, was considered a potential contributing factor.

Munson's two cornermen were his coaches from the Roufusport gym, and as the event promoter, Roufus appointed the ringside doctor, referee and other officials. It was Munson's first fight.

Video footage of the bout circulated widely. It was noted despite Munson showing signs of having difficulty returning to his corner, the staff including the doctor did not engage in administrating medical assistance until it was too late when Munson collapsed in the ring. Munson arrived at the hospital where he died a few hours later. After Munson's death, Roufus was publicly criticized by experts in the sport for his promotional practices, and the decisions and actions of the officials and Munson's cornermen at the bout. He was further criticized by several past students and past Roufousport staff for his treatment of students, behavior and management style at Roufusport gym.

In 2017, the family of Dennis Munson Jr filed a lawsuit against Roufusport and several staff that were part of the bout. It alleged those responsible for Munson's safety failed in their duty to protect him during the unregulated bout. The lawsuit was fully settled with all parties in 2020.

== Notable fighters ==
- Anthony Pettis
- Tyron Woodley
- Rose Namajunas
- Jens Pulver
- Ben Askren
- Sergio Pettis
- Pat Barry
- Dustin Ortiz
- Ben Rothwell
- Alan Belcher
- Matt Mitrione
- Pascal Krauss
- Sage Northcutt
- Paul Felder
- Belal Muhammad
- Erik Koch
- CM Punk
- Emmanuel Sanchez
- Gerald Meerschaert
- Mike Rhodes
- Sarah Kaufman
- Ryan Janes
- John Makdessi
- Jared Gordon
- Jordan Griffin
- Maycee Barber
- Brendan Allen

== See also ==
- List of professional MMA training camps
