= UFC on ESPN: Cannonier vs. Imavov =

Mixed martial arts event in 2024

- The poster for UFC on ESPN: Cannonier vs. Imavov
- Promotion: Ultimate Fighting Championship
- Date: June 8, 2024
- Venue: KFC Yum! Center
- City: Louisville, Kentucky, United States
- Attendance: 19,578
- Total gate: $2,500,652

Event chronology
UFC 302: Makhachev vs. Poirier	UFC on ESPN: Cannonier vs. Imavov	UFC on ESPN: Perez vs. Taira

UFC on ESPN: Cannonier vs. Imavov (also known as UFC on ESPN 57) was a mixed martial arts event produced by the Ultimate Fighting Championship that took place on June 8, 2024, at the KFC Yum! Center in Louisville, Kentucky, United States.

== Background ==
The event marked the promotion's second visit to Louisville and first since UFC Live: Sanchez vs. Kampmann in March 2011.

A middleweight bout between former UFC Middleweight Championship challenger Jared Cannonier and Nassourdine Imavov headlined the event.

A bantamweight bout between Raul Rosas Jr. and The Return of The Ultimate Fighter: Team Volkanovski vs. Team Ortega bantamweight winner Ricky Turcios took place at the event. They were originally scheduled to meet at UFC Fight Night: Moreno vs. Royval 2 on February 24, but Rosas Jr. was forced to withdraw just before the bout was expected to begin due to an illness. As a result, the pairing was initially pushed back one week to UFC Fight Night: Rozenstruik vs. Gaziev before it was ultimately cancelled by the promotion.

A middleweight bout between Roman Dolidze and Michel Pereira was briefly announced as part of the event. However, Pereira claimed he never signed any contracts for the fight and the bout fell through.

At the weigh-ins, Eduarda Moura weighed in at 116.5 pounds, half a pound over the women's strawweight non-title fight limit. The bout proceeded at catchweight and Moura was fined 20 percent of her purse which went to her opponent Denise Gomes.

== Results ==
Main card (ESPN / ESPN+)
Weight class				Method	Round	Time	Notes
Middleweight	Nassourdine Imavov	def.	Jared Cannonier	TKO (punches)	4	1:34
Light Heavyweight	Dominick Reyes	def.	Dustin Jacoby	KO (punches)	1	2:00
Bantamweight	Raul Rosas Jr.	def.	Ricky Turcios	Submission (rear-naked choke)	2	2:22
Middleweight	Brunno Ferreira	def.	Dustin Stoltzfus	KO (spinning back elbow)	1	4:51
Middleweight	Zachary Reese	def.	Julian Marquez	TKO (body kick and punches)	1	0:20
Welterweight	Punahele Soriano	def.	Miguel Baeza	Decision (unanimous) (30–25, 30–25, 30–27)	3	5:00
Preliminary card (ESPN+)
Lightweight	Ľudovít Klein	def.	Thiago Moisés	Decision (unanimous) (30–27, 30–27, 30–27)	3	5:00
Welterweight	Carlos Prates	def.	Charles Radtke	KO (knee to the body)	1	4:47
Bantamweight	Brad Katona	def.	Jesse Butler	Decision (unanimous) (30–26, 30–27, 30–27)	3	5:00
Women's Flyweight	Montana De La Rosa	def.	Andrea Lee	Decision (split) (28–29, 29–28, 29–28)	3	5:00
Bantamweight	Daniel Marcos	def.	John Castañeda	Decision (unanimous) (30–27, 30–27, 30–27)	3	5:00
Catchweight (116.5 lb)	Denise Gomes	def.	Eduarda Moura	Decision (split) (28–29, 30–27, 30–27)	3	5:00
Bantamweight	Taylor Lapilus	def.	Cody Stamann	Decision (unanimous) (30–27, 30–27, 30–27)	3	5:00
Women's Strawweight	Puja Tomar	def.	Rayanne dos Santos	Decision (split) (30–27, 27–30, 29–28)	3	5:00

== Bonus awards ==
The following fighters received $50,000 bonuses.

- Fight of the Night: No bonus awarded.
- Performance of the Night: Raul Rosas Jr., Brunno Ferreira, Zachary Reese, and Carlos Prates

== Reported payout ==
The following is the reported payout to the athletes as reported to the Kentucky Boxing and Wrestling Commission (KBWC). It does not include sponsor money or "locker room" bonuses often given by the UFC.

- Nassourdine Imavov: $126,000 (includes $63,000 win bonus) def. Jared Cannonier: $165,000
- Dominick Reyes: $250,000 (includes $125,000 win bonus) def. Dustin Jacoby: $100,000
- Raul Rosas Jr.: $80,000 (includes $40,000 win bonus) def. Ricky Turcios: $28,000
- Brunno Ferreira: $60,000 (includes $30,000 win bonus) def. Dustin Stoltzfus: $28,000
- Zach Reese: $20,000 (includes $10,000 win bonus) def. Julian Marquez: $50,000
- Puna Soriano: $100,000 (includes $50,000 win bonus) def. Miguel Baeza: $32,000
- Ludovit Klein: $86,000 (includes $43,000 win bonus) def. Thiago Moises: $58,000
- Carlos Prates: $24,000 (includes $12,000 win bonus) def. Charles Radtke: $15,000
- Brad Katona: $84,000 (includes $42,000 win bonus) def. Jesse Butler: $12,000
- Montana De La Rosa: $120,000 (includes $60,000 win bonus) def. Andrea Lee: $70,000
- Daniel Marcos: $48,000 (includes $24,000 win bonus) def. John Castaneda: $30,000
- Denise Gomes: $50,000 (includes $25,000 win bonus) def. Eduarda Moura: $12,000
- Taylor Lapilus: $28,000 (includes $14,000 win bonus) def. Cody Stamman: $78,000
- Puja Tomar: $20,000 (includes $10,000 win bonus) def. Rayanne Amanda: $12,000

== See also ==
- 2024 in UFC
- List of current UFC fighters
- List of UFC events
