= Jackson McVey =

American mixed martial artist (born 1999)

- Born: March 25, 1999 (age 27); Saint Paul, Minnesota, U.S.
- Other names: The Moose
- Height: 6 ft 4 in (1.93 m)
- Weight: 185 lb (84 kg; 13 st 3 lb)
- Division: Middleweight
- Reach: 77 in (196 cm)
- Fighting out of: Phoenix, Arizona, U.S.
- Team: The MMA Lab
- Years active: 2023–present

Mixed martial arts record
- Total: 10
- Wins: 8
- By knockout: 4
- By submission: 4
- Losses: 2
- By submission: 2

Other information
- Mixed martial arts record from Sherdog

Jackson McVey (born March 25, 1999) is an American mixed martial artist who competes in the Middleweight division of the Ultimate Fighting Championship.

== Mixed martial arts career ==
=== Early career ===
McVey started his amateur career during 2019–2022, he amassed a 6–1 record in amateur, including losing future UFC fighter Wesley Schultz. He turned pro in 2023, in regional promotion Legacy Fighting Alliance and Shamrock FC, where he acquired a 6–0 record before signed with the Ultimate Fighting Championship.

=== Ultimate Fighting Championship ===
On June 20, 2025, it was reported that McVey signed with the UFC and he was scheduled to face Sedriques Dumas on June 28, 2026, at UFC 317. However, Dumas pulled out for unknown reasons and was replaced by Christopher Ewert. In turn, Ewert then proceeded to miss weight by 10 pounds and was cut the same day, forcing the fight to be cancelled.

Replacing Ikram Aliskerov, who withdrew due to a broken toe. McVey made his UFC debut against Brunno Ferreira on July 19, 2025, at UFC 318. He lost the fight via a armbar in round one.

McVey was scheduled to face Robert Valentin on November 8, 2026, at UFC Fight Night 264. However, Valentin withdrew from the fight due to a back injury. Donte Johnson was initially considered as a replacement, having competed a week earlier at UFC Fight Night 263, in a 190-pound catchweight bout, but the Nevada State Athletic Commission declined the substitution because Johnson was under a two-week medical suspension. As a result, Zachary Reese stepped in against McVey in a 195 pounds catchweight bout. He lost the fight via a rear-naked choke in round two.

McVey faced Sedriques Dumas on April 25, 2026, at UFC Fight Night 274. He won the fight via a brabo choke in round one. This fight earned him a $100,000 Performance of the Night award.

McVey faced Wesley Schultz on August 22, 2026, at UFC Fight Night 285. He won the fight via technical knockout in round one.

== Championships and accomplishments ==
- Ultimate Fighting Championship
  - Performance of the Night (One times) vs. Sedriques Dumas

== Mixed martial arts record ==
Professional record breakdown
10 matches	8 wins	2 losses
By knockout	4	0
By submission	4	2

Res.	Record	Opponent	Method	Event	Date	Round	Time	Location	Notes
Win	8–2	Wesley Schultz	TKO (knee to the body and punches)	UFC Fight Night: Hernandez vs. Rodrigues	August 22, 2026	1	4:13	Sacramento, California, United States	
Win	7–2	Sedriques Dumas	Submission (brabo choke)	UFC Fight Night: Sterling vs. Zalal	April 25, 2026	1	2:14	Las Vegas, Nevada, United States	Performance of the Night.
Loss	6–2	Zachary Reese	Submission (rear-naked choke)	UFC Fight Night: Bonfim vs. Brown	November 8, 2025	2	1:38	Las Vegas, Nevada, United States	Catchweight (195 lb) bout.
Loss	6–1	Brunno Ferreira	Submission (armbar)	UFC 318	July 19, 2025	1	3:35	New Orleans, Louisiana, United States	
Win	6–0	Mataeo Garner	TKO (knee and punches)	LFA 210	June 13, 2025	1	1:28	Louisville, Kentucky, United States	
Win	5–0	Ben Fowler	Submission (brabo choke)	LFA 193	September 20, 2024	1	0:33	Prior Lake, Minnesota, United States	
Win	4–0	Jaquis Williams	Submission (guillotine choke)	Shamrock FC 356	July 13, 2024	1	0:53	St. Charles, Missouri, United States	Catchweight (200 lb) bout.
Win	3–0	James Regina	Submission (guillotine choke)	Shamrock FC 347	July 22, 2023	1	0:50	St. Charles, Missouri, United States	
Win	2–0	Tom Krenzel	TKO (punches)	LFA 157	April 21, 2023	1	3:47	Prior Lake, Minnesota, United States	
Win	1–0	Deven Paulsen	Submission (guillotine choke)	LFA 150	January 13, 2023	1	0:52	Prior Lake, Minnesota, United States	Middleweight debut.

== See also ==
- List of current UFC fighters
- List of male mixed martial artists
