= Ikram Aliskerov =

Russian mixed martial artist (born 1992)

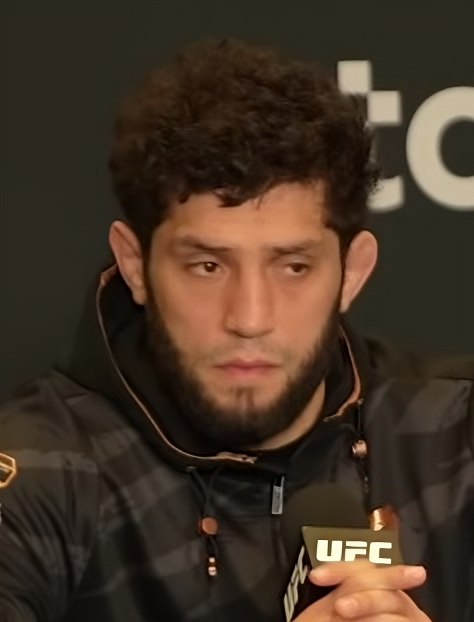
- Aliskerov in 2024
- Born: Ikram Sabirovich Aliskerov; December 7, 1992 (age 33); Kasumkent, Dagestan, Russia
- Native name: Икрам Алискеров
- Height: 6 ft 0 in (183 cm)
- Weight: 185 lb (84 kg; 13 st 3 lb)
- Division: Middleweight (2012–present)
- Reach: 76 in (193 cm)
- Style: Sambo
- Stance: Southpaw
- Fighting out of: Makhachkala, Dagestan, Russia
- Team: KHK MMA
- Rank: International Master of Sport in Combat Sambo
- Years active: 2012–present

Mixed martial arts record
- Total: 21
- Wins: 19
- By knockout: 7
- By submission: 5
- By decision: 7
- Losses: 2
- By knockout: 2

Other information
- Mixed martial arts record from Sherdog

Ikram Sabirovich Aliskerov (Note: Russian: Икрам Сабирович Алискеров) (born December 7, 1992) is a Russian professional mixed martial artist and former combat sambo competitor who currently competes in the middleweight division of the Ultimate Fighting Championship (UFC). As of October 24, 2026, he is #11 in the Meta UFC middleweight rankings.

Aliskerov is a four-time world champion in combat sambo (FIAS & WCSF) and two-time European champion (ESF & ECSF).

== Early life ==
An ethnic Lezgin, Aliskerov was born on December 7, 1992, in the village of Kasumkent in the Suleyman-Stalsky District of Dagestan, Russia. He started playing sports in the 5th grade, where he began attending sambo and judo classes. For years, Aliskerov trained under the guidance of experienced trainers who came from Abdulmanap Nurmagomedov’s gym. At the age of 19, he was invited to join the “Champion” club by coach Esadull Emiragaev, where he also began training in mixed martial arts.

== Combat sambo career ==
During his time as a combat sambo competitor, he became a world champion in 2016 under the FIAS banner, a two-time World Cup champion in 2014 and 2015 again under FIAS, and a European Champion in 2017 under the European Sambo Federation banner.

In September 2012, Aliskerov won gold at the Combat Sambo World Championships in 82 kg under the European Combat Sambo Federation banner. Former Bellator welterweight champion Yaroslav Amosov came out third in the 82 kg category against Aliskerov.

In December 2012, Aliskerov won the World Combat Sambo Championship in 82 kg under the World Combat Sambo Federation banner. It was again in this tournament that Amosov came out third against Aliskerov. Ikram Aliskerov is one of a few combat athletes who have technically beaten Yaroslav Amosov on two occasions in combat sambo tournaments.

During Aliskerov's career as a sambist, his victories included wins over world champions like Yaroslav Amosov, Murad Kerimov, and Raimond Magomedaliev in combat sambo tournaments.

Aliskerov would have competed for a fifth gold medal had he not lost to Alexey Ivanov (three-time sambo world champion) in a closely contested final. As a result of being the runner-up in the said tournament, Aliskerov qualified for and won the 2017 European Championships, held in Minsk, Belarus.

== Mixed martial arts career ==
=== Early career ===
Aliskerov competed three times in MMA between 2012 and 2015, winning all of his matches.

=== Brave Combat Federation ===
Aliskerov then focused entirely on this sport in 2017, when he signed a contract with Brave Combat Federation. He was scheduled to make his promotional debut against Will Fleury on April 29, 2017, at BCF 6. However, Fleury was forced to pull out of the contest and was replaced by Rufat Asadov. He won the bout via submission in the first round.

Aliskerov faced Jeremy Smith on November 17, 2017, at BCF 9. He won the fight via knockout in the first round.

Aliskerov faced Chad Hanekom on March 2, 2018, at BCF 10. He won the bout by split decision.

He was then scheduled to meet Diego Gonzalez on August 18, 2018, at BCF 14. However, Gonzalez pulled out of the bout and was replaced by Joey Michael Berkenbosch. He won the bout via technical knockout in the first round.

Aliskerov faced Geraldo Coelho de Lima Neto on December 28, 2018, at BCF 21. He won the fight via technical knockout in the third round.

Aliskerov faced undefeated prospect Khamzat Chimaev on April 19, 2019, at BCF 23. He lost the fight via knockout in the first round, marking his first defeat.

Aliskerov was slated to came back against Mohammad Fakhreddine on October 4, 2019, at BCF 27. However, the bout was cancelled due to the COVID-19 pandemic. Instead, he faced Diego Gonzalez on December 27, 2019, at BCF 33. He won the bout via technical knockout in round three.

Aliskerov faced Denis Tiuliulin on September 17, 2020, at Brave CF 41. He won the fight via submission in the third round.

Aliskerov faced Miro Jurković on March 25, 2021, at Brave CF 49. He won the bout via second round kimura.

=== Eagle Fighting Championship ===
Aliskerov faced Nah-Shon Burrell at Eagle FC 46 on March 11, 2022. At weigh ins, Ikram Aliskerov missed weight for his bout. Aliskerov weighed in at 186.2 pounds, 0.2 pounds over the middleweight non-title limit. The bout proceeded at catchweight and he was fined a percentage of his purse, which went to Burrell. He won the bout via unanimous decision.

=== Dana White Contender Series ===
Aliskerov faced Mário Sousa on September 13, 2022, at Dana White's Contender Series 54. He won the fight via kimura submission in round one, winning a UFC contract in the process.

=== Ultimate Fighting Championship ===
Aliskerov faced Phil Hawes on May 6, 2023, at UFC 288. He won the fight via knockout in the first round.

Aliskerov was scheduled to face Paulo Costa on July 29, 2023, at UFC 291. However, on July 19 it was announced that the bout was scrapped and Aliskerov would instead face Nassourdine Imavov on October 21, 2023, at UFC 294. In turn, Imavov withdrew due to visa issues and was replaced by Warlley Alves. Aliskerov won the fight by technical knockout in the first round. This fight earned him the Performance of the Night award.

Aliskerov was scheduled to face Anthony Hernandez on February 17, 2024, at UFC 298. However Aliskerov withdrew due to compilations related to illness and was replaced by Roman Kopylov.

Aliskerov was scheduled to face André Muniz on June 15, 2024, at UFC on ESPN 58. However, Muniz withdrew from the bout after he suffered a foot fracture, and was replaced by promotional newcomer Antonio Trócoli. In turn, Aliskerov was pulled from that bout to instead face former UFC Middleweight champion Robert Whittaker on June 22, 2024, in the main event at UFC on ABC 6, as a replacement for an ill Khamzat Chimaev. He lost the fight by knockout in the first round.

Aliskerov was re-booked to face André Muniz on February 1, 2025 at UFC Fight Night 250. However, the bout was cancelled once again due to Muniz's and his team's visa issues and was rescheduled for April 26, 2025 at UFC on ESPN 66. Aliskerov won the fight by technical knockout at the end of the first round.

Aliskerov was scheduled to face Brunno Ferreira on July 19, 2025 at UFC 318. However, Aliskerov had to withdraw from the bout due to a broken toe and was replaced by promotional newcomer Jackson McVey.

Aliskerov faced Jun Yong Park on October 25, 2025 at UFC 321. He won the fight by unanimous decision.

Aliskerov faced Brunno Ferreira on June 27, 2026 at UFC Fight Night 280. He won the fight by unanimous decision.

Aliskerov faced Jared Cannonier on November 21, 2026 at UFC Fight Night 294. He won the fight by unanimous decision.

== Championships and accomplishments ==
=== Combat Sambo ===
- Fédération Internationale de Sambo
  - (gold) World Championship-Sofia, Bulgaria (2016) at 90 kg
  - (gold) World Cup-Moscow, Russia (2014) at 82 kg
  - (gold) World Cup-Moscow, Russia (2015) at 90 kg
- World Combat Sambo Federation
  - (gold) World Championship-Moscow, Russia (2012) at 82 kg
- European Sambo Federation
  - (gold) European Championship-Minsk, Belarus (2017) at 82 kg
- European Combat Sambo Federation
  - (gold) European Championship-Chișinău, Moldova (2012) at 82 kg
- All-Russian Sambo Federation
  - (gold) Cup of Russia in Combat Sambo-Moscow, Russia (2013) at 82 kg
  - (silver) Russian Combat Sambo Championship-Nizhny Novgorod, Russia (2017) at 82 kg

=== Mixed martial arts ===
- Ultimate Fighting Championship
  - Performance of the Night (One time) vs. Warlley Alves
  - UFC Honors Awards
    - 2023: Fan's Choice Debut of the Year Nominee vs. Phil Hawes
  - UFC.com Awards
    - 2023: Ranked #3 Newcomer of the Year

== Mixed martial arts record ==
Professional record breakdown
21 matches	19 wins	2 losses
By knockout	7	2
By submission	5	0
By decision	7	0

Res.	Record	Opponent	Method	Event	Date	Round	Time	Location	Notes
Win	19–2	Jared Cannonier	Decision (unanimous)	UFC Fight Night: Procházka vs. Stirling	November 21, 2026	3	5:00	Al Rayyan, Qatar	
Win	18–2	Brunno Ferreira	Decision (unanimous)	UFC Fight Night: Fiziev vs. Torres	June 27, 2026	3	5:00	Baku, Azerbaijan	
Win	17–2	Park Jun-yong	Decision (unanimous)	UFC 321	October 25, 2025	3	5:00	Abu Dhabi, United Arab Emirates	
Win	16–2	André Muniz	TKO (punches)	UFC on ESPN: Machado Garry vs. Prates	April 26, 2025	1	4:54	Kansas City, Missouri, United States	
Loss	15–2	Robert Whittaker	KO (punches)	UFC on ABC: Whittaker vs. Aliskerov	June 22, 2024	1	1:49	Riyadh, Saudi Arabia	
Win	15–1	Warlley Alves	TKO (flying knee and punches)	UFC 294	October 21, 2023	1	2:07	Abu Dhabi, United Arab Emirates	Performance of the Night.
Win	14–1	Phil Hawes	KO (punches)	UFC 288	May 6, 2023	1	2:10	Newark, New Jersey, United States	
Win	13–1	Mário Sousa	Submission (kimura)	Dana White's Contender Series 54	September 13, 2022	1	2:09	Las Vegas, Nevada, United States	
Win	12–1	Nah-Shon Burrell	Decision (unanimous)	Eagle FC 46	March 11, 2022	3	5:00	Miami, Florida, United States	Catchweight (186.2 lb) bout; Aliskerov missed weight.
Win	11–1	Miro Jurković	Submission (kimura)	Brave CF 49	March 25, 2021	2	1:11	Riffa, Bahrain	
Win	10–1	Denis Tiuliulin	Submission (kimura)	Brave CF 41	September 17, 2020	3	1:48	Riffa, Bahrain	
Win	9–1	Diego Gonzalez	TKO (punches)	Brave CF 33	December 17, 2019	3	2:04	Jeddah, Saudi Arabia	
Loss	8–1	Khamzat Chimaev	KO (punch)	Brave CF 23	April 19, 2019	1	2:26	Amman, Jordan	Catchweight (180 lb) bout.
Win	8–0	Geraldo Coelho de Lima Neto	TKO (punches)	Brave CF 21	December 28, 2018	3	N/A	Jeddah, Saudi Arabia	Catchweight (175 lb) bout.
Win	7–0	Joey Michael Berkenbosch	TKO (punches)	Brave CF 14	August 18, 2018	1	2:15	Tangier, Morocco	Catchweight (189.4 lb) bout; Aliskerov missed weight.
Win	6–0	Chad Hanekom	Decision (split)	Brave CF 10	March 2, 2018	3	5:00	Amman, Jordan	
Win	5–0	Jeremy Smith	KO (punches)	Brave CF 9	November 17, 2017	1	2:01	Isa Town, Bahrain	
Win	4–0	Rufat Asadov	Submission (guillotine choke)	Brave CF 6	April 29, 2017	1	4:00	Almaty, Kazakhstan	
Win	3–0	Dmitry Aryshev	Decision (unanimous)	Fight Nights Global 41	September 25, 2015	2	5:00	Kaspiysk, Russia	
Win	2–0	Vladimir Stukalov	Submission (armbar)	Tech-KREP FC: Prime Selection 4	July 24, 2015	1	3:24	Krasnodar, Russia	
Win	1–0	Alimjon Shadmanov	Decision (unanimous)	Fight Star: European MMA Cup	April 26, 2012	2	5:00	Nizhny Novgorod, Russia	Middleweight debut.

== See also ==
- List of current UFC fighters
- List of Dana White's Contender Series alumni
- List of male mixed martial artists
