= Ryan Janes =

Canadian mixed martial arts fighter

- Born: August 22, 1981 (age 45); Grand Falls-Windsor, Newfoundland, Canada
- Height: 6 ft 3 in (1.91 m)
- Weight: 84 kg (185 lb; 13 st 3 lb)
- Division: Middleweight
- Reach: 76 in (193 cm)
- Fighting out of: Victoria, British Columbia, Canada
- Team: Zugec Ultimate Martial Arts
- Trainer: Adam Zugec
- Rank: Black belt in Brazilian Jiu-Jitsu
- Years active: 2008–2018

Mixed martial arts record
- Total: 13
- Wins: 10
- By knockout: 2
- By submission: 6
- By decision: 2
- Losses: 3
- By submission: 1
- By decision: 2

Other information
- Mixed martial arts record from Sherdog

Ryan Janes (born August 22, 1981) is a retired Canadian mixed martial artist. He most recently competed in the Middleweight division of the Ultimate Fighting Championship. A professional MMA competitor since 2008, he formerly competed for King of the Cage.

== Background ==
Janes was born in Grand Falls-Windsor, Newfoundland, Canada and he earned a diploma in Computer Programming. He works full-time as a web developer for Canada provincial government and he is a professional MMA fighter under UFC promoter.

After Janes moved from Newfoundland to Victoria for a warmer climate to live, he joined a fitness gym and trained regularity to get in shape. However, the routine of weight training was unattractive to him and he signed up to an MMA gym in 2006. He felt in love with MMA soon after. Janes started competing after his coach, Adam Zugec, asked him if he was interested to compete and he jumped at the chance and never looked back since.

== Mixed martial arts career ==
=== Early career ===
Janes fought primarily in British Columbia under the King of the Cage Canada, Armageddon Fighting Championship, WSOF Canada and Battlefield Fight League. He was the Battlefield Fight League middleweight champion and he amassed a record of 8–1 prior signed by Ultimate Fighting Championship.

=== Ultimate Fighting Championship ===
Janes was expected to make his promotional debut against Adam Hunter on August 27, 2016, at UFC on Fox 21. However, the bout was cancelled after Hunter was flagged by USADA for potential drug violation.

Janes debut was rescheduled and was expected to faced Dongi Yang on October 15, 2016, at UFC Fight Night: Lamas vs. Penn. However, the promotion announced on October 6 that they had cancelled the event entirely.

After a long delay, Janes finally made his debut on December 9, 2016, at UFC Fight Night: Lewis vs. Abdurakhimov against Keith Berish. He won the fight by unanimous decision.

On February 19, 2017, Janes face Gerald Meerschaert at UFC Fight Night: Lewis vs. Browne. He lost the fight via submission in the first round.

Janes faced Jack Marshman on July 16, 2017, at UFC Fight Night: Nelson vs. Ponzinibbio. He lost by unanimous decision (29–28, 29–28, 29–28).

Janes faced Andrew Sanchez on December 1, 2017, at The Ultimate Fighter 26 Finale. He won the fight via TKO in the third round.

On October 10, 2018, Janes announced his retirement from professional MMA competition.

== Championships and accomplishments ==
=== Mixed martial arts ===
- Battlefield Fight League
  - Battlefield Fight League Middleweight Champion (One time) vs. Brendan Kornberger

== Personal life ==
Janes described himself as a 'big softy with no roughness to his edges and who loves hugs, comic books and superhero movies". He said most people could not connect him as a professional fighter with his gentle demeanor. Janes is also a cat lover and he has two cats.

== Mixed martial arts record ==
Professional record breakdown
| 13 matches | 10 wins | 3 losses |
| By knockout | 2 | 0 |
| By submission | 6 | 1 |
| By decision | 2 | 2 |

| Res. | Record | Opponent | Method | Event | Date | Round | Time | Location | Notes |
|---|---|---|---|---|---|---|---|---|---|
| Win | 10–3 | Andrew Sanchez | TKO (punches) | The Ultimate Fighter: A New World Champion Finale | December 1, 2017 | 3 | 0:59 | Las Vegas, Nevada, United States | |
| Loss | 9–3 | Jack Marshman | Decision (unanimous) | UFC Fight Night: Nelson vs. Ponzinibbio | July 16, 2017 | 3 | 5:00 | Glasgow, Scotland | |
| Loss | 9–2 | Gerald Meerschaert | Submission (armbar) | UFC Fight Night: Lewis vs. Browne | February 19, 2017 | 1 | 1:34 | Halifax, Nova Scotia, Canada | |
| Win | 9–1 | Keith Berish | Decision (unanimous) | UFC Fight Night: Lewis vs. Abdurakhimov | December 9, 2016 | 3 | 5:00 | Albany, New York, United States | |
| Win | 8–1 | Brendan Kornberger | Submission (rear-naked choke) | Battlefield Fight League 37 | July 25, 2015 | 4 | 0:46 | Coquitlam, British Columbia, Canada | Defended the Battlefield Fight League Middleweight Championship. |
| Win | 7–1 | David Perron | Submission (rear-naked choke) | Battlefield Fight League 35 | March 28, 2015 | 2 | 4:38 | Vancouver, British Columbia, Canada | Won the Battlefield Fight League Middleweight Championship. |
| Win | 6–1 | David Perron | Submission (rear-naked choke) | WSOF Canada 2 | June 7, 2014 | 1 | 4:23 | Edmonton, Alberta, Canada | |
| Win | 5–1 | Keto Allen | Decision (unanimous) | Armageddon Fighting Championship 13 | November 3, 2012 | 3 | 5:00 | Victoria, British Columbia, Canada | |
| Win | 4–1 | Marcus Hicks | Submission (rear-naked choke) | Armageddon Fighting Championship 8 | April 14, 2012 | 2 | 2:04 | Victoria, British Columbia, Canada | |
| Win | 3–1 | Duncan Wilson | Submission (rear-naked choke) | Armageddon Fighting Championship 6 | June 18, 2011 | 1 | 1:17 | Victoria, British Columbia, Canada | |
| Win | 2–1 | Geordie McCredie | TKO (punches) | King of the Cage Canada: Uprising 2 | March 12, 2010 | 1 | 1:33 | Nanaimo, British Columbia, Canada | |
| Loss | 1–1 | Mike Hackert | Decision (unanimous) | King of the Cage Canada: Island Pride | May 8, 2009 | 3 | 5:00 | Nanaimo, British Columbia, Canada | |
| Win | 1–0 | Ryan Ballingall | Submission (rear-naked choke) | King of the Cage Canada: Impact | October 18, 2008 | 1 | 0:55 | Nanaimo, British Columbia, Canada | |

== See also ==
- List of current UFC fighters
- List of male mixed martial artists
- List of Canadian UFC fighters
