= Duke Roufus =

American kickboxer and trainer (1970–2025)

- Born: Jeffrey Ryan Roufus; February 19, 1970; Milwaukee, Wisconsin, U.S.
- Died: October 17, 2025 (aged 55)
- Height: 6 ft 0 in (1.83 m)
- Weight: 235 lb (107 kg; 16.8 st)
- Division: Heavyweight
- Style: Kickboxing, Muay Thai, Taekwondo, Karate, Brazilian Jiu-Jitsu
- Fighting out of: Milwaukee, Wisconsin, U.S.
- Team: Roufusport
- Rank: 4th degree black belt in Roufusport Kickboxing; 3rd degree black belt in Taekwondo; Purple belt in Brazilian jiu-jitsu
- Years active: 1988–2008 (Kickboxing)

Kickboxing record
- Total: 45
- Wins: 36
- By knockout: 26
- Losses: 8
- Draws: 1
- No contests: 0

Other information
- Notable relatives: Rick Roufus (brother)
- Notable students: Alan Belcher, Stephan Bonnar, Matt Mitrione, Anthony Pettis, Sergio Pettis, Emmanuel Sanchez, Paul Felder, Maycee Barber, Jared Gordon, Jens Pulver, Ben Rothwell, Ben Askren, Erik Koch, CM Punk, Tyron Woodley, Christian Rodriguez, Pat Barry, Rose Namajunas

Jeffrey Ryan "Duke" Roufus (February 19, 1970 – October 17, 2025) was an American kickboxer and head coach of Roufusport based in Milwaukee, Wisconsin, United States. He was a well-known striking coach in North America.

== Career ==
Duke Roufus started training in martial arts at an early age. He was the younger brother of kickboxer Rick "The Jet" Roufus.

His professional kickboxing career saw him collect a number of titles. In the 1990s he won the W.K.A. North American Super Heavyweight Championship, W.A.K.O. World Super Heavyweight Championship, W.K.B.A. World Super Heavyweight Championship and the K.I.C.K. World Super Heavyweight Championship and the I.K.F. Pro Muay Thai Rules Super Heavyweight World Title on December 4, 1998 in Milwaukee Wisconsin, over Hiriwa TeRangi of New Zealand by unanimous decision 50-43 on all three judges' cards. On March 19, 1999, in Milwaukee, Wisconsin, in his only defense of his I.K.F. title, Roufus defeated Australia's WKA World Champion Grant Barker. Roufus took 39 seconds to knock out the Australian in the opening round of the scheduled 5 round Muay Thai bout. He opened Milwaukee Kickboxing & Fitness Club in June 1997.

Roufus voluntarily vacated his Super Heavyweight I.K.F. Title to move down to the Heavyweight Muay Thai Division, and soon after retired. At the end of October 2000, Roufus announced he would come out of retirement to fight in the K-1 USA tournament. He lost his second round bout in the May 2001 K-1 USA tournament and his opening round bout in the August, 2001 K-1 USA tournament.

On December 11, 2002, Roufus made his retirement official. His final kickboxing record was 36–8–1 and in pro boxing he was 2–0.

On two further occasions Roufus came out of retirement to fight in the ring to record wins against Sinisa "Thunderman" Andrijasevic on June 3, 2005, and Eduardo Maiorino on May 25, 2007.

Following his retirement, he became a trainer, working with many mixed martial artists including former UFC Lightweight Champion Anthony Pettis, Alan Belcher, Pat Barry, Rose Namajunas, Chico Camus, Erik Koch, Ben Rothwell, Matt Mitrione, former U.S. Olympian and former Bellator World Champion Ben Askren and former UFC Welterweight Champion Tyron Woodley. Other former students include Kill Cliff FC coach Jason Strout, former UFC Lightweight Champion Jens Pulver, The Ultimate Fighter Season One star Stephan Bonnar and CM Punk.

Duke Roufus, business partner Scott Joffe and Anthony Pettis operated Roufusport Martial Arts Academy in Milwaukee, Wisconsin.

Roufus also served as color commentator for K-1 on ESPN2 and has appeared on TSN in Canada, Walker Texas Ranger and Fox's Best Damn Sport's Show Period.

Roufus and Joffe also operated NAFC MMA & Kickboxing, which served as a launching pad for many current and former stars of MMA. Following Roufus's sudden passing, it was announced by Joffe that the promotion would be coming to a close and cancel all upcoming events, making its final one a Summer Slam that occurred on September 6, 2025.

== Personal life and death ==
On October 17, 2025, Roufus's business partner, Scott Joffe, announced via a Facebook post that Roufus had died in his sleep earlier that day. He was 55.

== Honors and titles ==
- 1998 I.K.F. World Super Heavyweight Champion
- 1997 K.I.C.K. World Super Heavyweight Champion
- 1996 W.K.B.A. World Super Heavyweight Champion
- 1995 W.A.K.O. World Super Heavyweight Champion
- 1995 I.S.K.A. World Super Heavyweight champion
- 1995 W.K.A. World Super Heavyweight champion
- 1993 W.K.A. North American Super Heavyweight Champion
- 1991 W.A.K.O. World Championships in London, UK (bronze) +84 kg (Light-Contact)

== Kickboxing record (incomplete) ==
Kickboxing record
36 wins (26 KO's), 8 losses, 1 draw
Date	Result	Opponent	Event	Location	Method	Round	Time	Notes
March 29, 2008	Win	(United States) Lawson Baker	Gladiators Fighting's 50th -"Knockout Kings"	Milwaukee, Wisconsin, United States	Decision (Unanimous)	3		
May 25, 2007	Win	(Brazil) Eduardo Maiorino	Colosseum 5	Winnipeg, Manitoba, Canada	TKO (Leg Kicks)	2	0:56	
June 3, 2005	Win	(Croatia) Sinisa Andrijasevic	Heavyweight Gladiators	Milwaukee, Wisconsin, United States	Decision (Unanimous)	5	3:00	
August 17, 2002	Loss	(United States) Marvin Eastman	K-1 World Grand Prix 2002 in Las Vegas	Las Vegas, Nevada, United States	KO (knees to the body)	3	0:19	
September 29, 2001	Win	(Mexico) Pedro Fernandez	Heavyweight Gladiators	Milwaukee, Wisconsin, United States	TKO (Corner Stoppage)	4		
August 11, 2001	Loss	(Germany) Stefan Leko	K-1 World Grand Prix 2001 in Las Vegas	Las Vegas, Nevada, United States	TKO	2	2:34	
May 5, 2001	Loss	(Canada) Michael McDonald	K-1 World Grand Prix 2001 Preliminary USA	Las Vegas, Nevada, United States	Decision (Unanimous)	3	3:00	
May 5, 2001	Win	(Poland) Tomasz Kucharzewski	K-1 World Grand Prix 2001 Preliminary USA	Las Vegas, Nevada, United States	TKO (2 knockdowns)	1	2:26	
October 23, 1999	Win	(United States) Dewey Cooper		Milwaukee, Wisconsin, United States	Decision (unanimous)	5	3:00	
March 19, 1999	Win	(Australia) Grant Barker		Milwaukee, Wisconsin, United States	KO (High Kick)	1	0:39	Defended IKF Super Heavyweight World title.
December 4, 1998	Win	(New Zealand) Hiriwa TeRangi		Milwaukee, Wisconsin, United States	Decision (Unanimous)			Won IKF Super Heavyweight World title.
June 25, 1997	Win	(United States) Patrick Smith		Ledyard, Connecticut, United States	TKO (Leg Kick)	2		Defended KICK Super Heavyweight World title.
March 10, 1996	Loss	(South Africa) Mike Bernardo	K-1 Grand Prix '96 Opening Battle	Yokohama, Japan	TKO	2	1:37	
March 25, 1995	Win	(Australia) Stan Longinidis	World Cup of Martial Arts	Ledyard, Connecticut, United States	KO (Overhand Right Straight)	1	0:41	Won WKA, ISKA and WAKO World Super Heavyweight titles
October 2, 1994	Loss	(Switzerland) Andy Hug	1994 Seidokaikan Karate World Cup		KO (Kick to the Body)	3	2:17	
September 18, 1994	Win	(Japan) Takeshi Tanaka	K-1 Revenge	Yokohama, Japan	KO (Right Punch)	2	0:05	
June 3, 1993	Win	(United States) Zinnie Reynolds		Milwaukee, Wisconsin, United States				Won WKA North American Championship
Legend: Win Loss Draw/no contest

== See also ==
- List of male kickboxers
- Kickboxing
- Muay Thai
