= UFC Fight Night: Błachowicz vs. Jacaré =

UFC mixed martial arts event in 2019

- The poster for UFC Fight Night: Błachowicz vs. Jacaré
- Promotion: Ultimate Fighting Championship
- Date: November 16, 2019
- Venue: Ginásio do Ibirapuera
- City: São Paulo, Brazil
- Attendance: 10,344

Event chronology
UFC Fight Night: Zabit vs. Kattar	UFC Fight Night: Błachowicz vs. Jacaré	UFC on ESPN: Overeem vs. Rozenstruik

UFC Fight Night: Błachowicz vs. Jacaré (also known as UFC Fight Night 164 and UFC on ESPN+ 22) was a mixed martial arts event produced by the Ultimate Fighting Championship that took place on November 16, 2019 at Ginásio do Ibirapuera in São Paulo, Brazil.

== Background ==
A light heavyweight bout between former KSW Light Heavyweight Champion Jan Błachowicz and former Strikeforce Middleweight Champion Ronaldo Souza served as the event headliner.

A light heavyweight bout between Antônio Rogério Nogueira and Trevor Smith was scheduled for the event. However, Nogueira was forced to pull out of the event due to injury, resulting in the cancellation of the bout. Smith was then expected to face Makhmud Muradov at UFC on ESPN: Overeem vs. Rozenstruik.

Leah Letson was expected to face Duda Santana at the event. However, Letson was removed from the bout in late September for undisclosed reasons. Instead, Santana was expected to face promotional newcomer Tracy Cortez. However, Santana then withdrew from the bout and was replaced by Vanessa Melo.

Kevin Holland was scheduled to face promotional newcomer Antônio Arroyo at the event. However, promotion officials elected to remove Holland from the bout in favor of a matchup a month earlier at UFC on ESPN: Reyes vs. Weidman. In turn, Trevin Giles, then Alessio Di Chirico were briefly linked as replacements to face Arroyo. Instead, Arroyo fought fellow newcomer André Muniz.

A middleweight bout between Markus Perez and Jack Marshman was scheduled for the event. However, Marshman was pulled from the event for an undisclosed reason and replaced by Wellington Turman.

Sam Alvey was scheduled to face former UFC Light Heavyweight Champion Maurício Rua at the event. However, Alvey was removed from the fight on October 25 due to a broken hand. Instead, Rua fought Paul Craig.

A flyweight bout between former KSW Women's Flyweight Champion Ariane Lipski and Priscila Cachoeira was scheduled to take place at the event. However, upon testing positive for a diuretic and being pulled from the event, Cachoeira was replaced by Veronica Macedo. In turn, Macedo was not cleared to fight by CABMMA due to severe headaches one day before the event and she was replaced by newcomer Isabella de Pádua. At the weigh-ins, de Pádua weighed in at 130.5 pounds, 4.5 pounds over the flyweight non-title fight limit of 126 pounds. The bout proceeded at a catchweight. As a result of missing weight, de Pádua was fined 30% of her purse, which went to Lipski.

At the weigh-ins, Tracy Cortez and her opponent Vanessa Melo both missed weight for their fight. Cortez and Melo both weighed in at 136.5 pounds, 0.5 pounds over the bantamweight non-title fight limit of 136 pounds. The bout would initially proceed at a catchweight and no fine was issued due to identical misses. However, later on the same day, CABMMA executive director Cristiano Sampaio announced that due to an error of the scale used at the weigh-ins, which was set was 0.7 pounds above the official scale, Cortez and Melo were officially clear from missing weight and thus the bout proceeded at bantamweight.

== Results ==
Fight Card (ESPN+)
Weight class				Method	Round	Time	Notes
Light Heavyweight	Jan Błachowicz	def.	Ronaldo Souza	Decision (split) (48–47, 47–48, 48–47)	5	5:00
Light Heavyweight	Maurício Rua	vs.	Paul Craig	Draw (split) (29–28, 28–29, 28–28)	3	5:00
Lightweight	Charles Oliveira	def.	Jared Gordon	KO (punches)	1	1:26
Middleweight	André Muniz	def.	Antônio Arroyo	Decision (unanimous) (30–27, 30–27, 30–27)	3	5:00
Middleweight	Wellington Turman	def.	Markus Perez	Decision (unanimous) (30–27, 30–27, 30–27)	3	5:00
Preliminary Card (ESPN+)
Welterweight	James Krause	def.	Sérgio Moraes	KO (punches)	3	4:19
Featherweight	Ricardo Ramos	def.	Luiz Eduardo Garagorri	Submission (rear-naked choke)	1	3:57
Lightweight	Francisco Trinaldo	def.	Bobby Green	Decision (unanimous) (30–27, 29–28, 29–28)	3	5:00
Welterweight	Randy Brown	def.	Warlley Alves	Submission (triangle choke)	2	1:22
Featherweight	Douglas Silva de Andrade	def.	Renan Barão	Decision (unanimous) (30–27, 30–27, 30–26)	3	5:00
Catchweight (130.5 Ibs)	Ariane Lipski	def.	Isabella de Pádua	Decision (unanimous) (30–26, 30–26, 29–27)	3	5:00	(Note: de Pádua was deducted a point in round 2 due to an illegal upkick.)
Women's Bantamweight	Tracy Cortez	def.	Vanessa Melo	Decision (unanimous) (30–27, 30–27, 29–28)	3	5:00

== Bonus awards ==
The following fighters received $50,000 bonuses.

- Fight of the Night: No bonus awarded.
- Performance of the Night: Charles Oliveira, James Krause, Ricardo Ramos, and Randy Brown

== See also ==
- List of UFC events
- 2019 in UFC
- List of current UFC fighters
