= Markus Perez =

Brazilian mixed martial arts fighter

Markus Perez Echeimberg
- Born: June 22, 1990 (age 36); São Paulo, Brazil
- Other names: Maluko
- Height: 6 ft 2 in (1.88 m)
- Weight: 185 lb (84 kg; 13 st 3 lb)
- Division: Light Heavyweight; Middleweight; Welterweight
- Reach: 73 in (185 cm)
- Fighting out of: São Paulo, Brazil
- Team: Viscardi Andrade Team; Veras TK; American Top Team
- Teacher: Viscardi Andradre
- Rank: Brown belt in Brazilian Jiu-Jitsu; Black prajiad in Muay Thai
- Years active: 2013–present

Mixed martial arts record
- Total: 22
- Wins: 15
- By knockout: 3
- By submission: 9
- By decision: 3
- Losses: 7
- By knockout: 1
- By decision: 6

Other information
- Occupation: software developer
- Mixed martial arts record from Sherdog

Markus Perez Echeimberg (born June 22, 1990) is a Brazilian mixed martial artist currently competing in the Middleweight division. A professional since 2013, he has also fought for Ultimate Fighting Championship (UFC), Jungle Fight and the Legacy Fighting Alliance, where he is the former Middleweight Champion.

== Background ==
Echeimberg started training Kung-Fu style Eagle Claw in 2008 to impersonate Bruce Lee and later transitioned to mixed martial arts (MMA) after his brother took him to a jiu-jitsu class. Prior competing full-time in MMA, Markus worked as an information technology engineer at technology school and he was also a freelanced software developer, and he quit his job and college to teach Muay Thai and competed in Brazilian jiu-jitsu to make a living so he could pursue MMA full-time. After made it to the preliminary round of The Ultimate Fighter: Brazil 3, he gained his parents support as they realized his seriousness of his MMA career choice.

== Mixed martial arts career ==
=== Early career ===
Echeimberg fought in the Brazilian-based promotions and amassed of a record of 9–0 prior joining UFC after winning the Legacy Fighting Alliance (LFA) middleweight championship.

=== The Ultimate Fighter: Brazil ===
Echeimberg was chosen to be a fighter on The Ultimate Fighter: Brazil 3. In the opening elimination round, he lost to Guilherme Vasconcelos via submission (rear-naked choke) in the first round.

=== Ultimate Fighting Championship ===
Less than two months after winning the vacant Legacy Fighting Alliance (LFA), Echeimberg was signed by UFC. Perez made his UFC debut on December 9, 2017, against Eryk Anders, replacing John Phillips, at UFC Fight Night 123. He lost the fight via unanimous decision.

His next fight came on May 12, 2018, against James Bochnovic at UFC 224. He won the fight via a submission.

On August 25, 2018, Perez faced Andrew Sanchez, replacing Antonio Braga Neto, at UFC Fight Night 135. He lost the fight via unanimous decision.

Perez faced promotional newcomer Anthony Hernandez on February 2, 2019, at UFC on ESPN+ 2. He won the fight via technical submission in the second round.

Perez was scheduled to face promotional newcomer Deron Winn on June 22, 2019, at UFC on ESPN+ 11 However, it was reported on May 9, 2019, that Perez pulled out of the fight due to injury.

Perez was scheduled to face Jack Marshman on November 16, 2019, at UFC on ESPN+ 22. However, Marshman was pulled from the event for undisclosed reason and he was replaced by Wellington Turman.

Perez faced Wellington Turman on November 16, 2019, at UFC Fight Night: Błachowicz vs. Jacaré. He lost the fight via unanimous decision.

Perez was scheduled to face Alessio Di Chirico, replacing Abu Azaitar, on April 11, 2020, at UFC Fight Night: Overeem vs. Harris. Due to the COVID-19 pandemic, the event was eventually cancelled.

Perez was scheduled to face Eric Spicely on August 1, 2020, at UFC Fight Night: Brunson vs. Shahbazyan. However, Spicely was removed from the fight on the day of the event's weigh-in for health issues related to his weight cut. Perez will now face Charles Ontiveros

Perez was scheduled to face Rodolfo Vieira on October 11, 2020 at UFC Fight Night 179, However, on September 21, Vieira pulled out due to undisclosed reasons, and he was replaced by promotional newcomer Dricus du Plessis. Perez lost the fight via knockout in round one.

Perez faced Dalcha Lungiambula, replacing Isi Fitikefu, on January 20, 2021, at UFC on ESPN 20. He lost the fight via unanimous decision.

On February 4, 2021, it was announced that Perez was released from his UFC contract.

=== Post-UFC career ===
Perez was scheduled to face Shane O'Shea at Titan FC 68 on March 26, 2021. However, the bout was cancelled due to an unknown reason.

Perez was scheduled to face Christiano Frohlich on July 2, 2021, at LFA 110. The bout was scratched days before the event for unknown reasons.

Perez faced Zac Pauga on October 17, 2021, at Cage Warriors 130. He lost the bout via unanimous decision.

Perez faced Filipe Moitinho on December 19, 2021, at Thunder Fight 33. He won the bout via guillotine submission 33 seconds into the bout.

Perez faced Emiliano Sordi at Gamebred FC 4 in a bare-knuckle MMA bout on May 5, 2023, losing the bout via unanimous decision.

==== Global Fight League ====
On December 11, 2024, it was announced that Perez was signed by Global Fight League. However, in April 2025, it was reported that all GFL events were cancelled indefinitely.

== Championships and achievements ==
- Legacy Fighting Alliance
  - Legacy Fighting Alliance Middleweight Champion (One time) vs. Ian Heinisch
- Thunder Fight
  - Thunder Fight Middleweight Champion

== Personal life ==
Echeimberg's moniker "Maluko", an adaptation of the word "maluco" which means "crazy" in Portuguese, was given by his teammates, who thought he was crazy after he asked his coach if he could wear Kung Fu pants and shoes while he was boxing training to impersonate Bruce Lee.

== Mixed martial arts record ==
Professional record breakdown
| 22 matches | 15 wins | 7 losses |
| By knockout | 3 | 1 |
| By submission | 9 | 0 |
| By decision | 3 | 6 |

| Res. | Record | Opponent | Method | Event | Date | Round | Time | Location | Notes |
|---|---|---|---|---|---|---|---|---|---|
| Win | 15–7 | Lajuan Davis | Submission (rear-naked choke) | Peak Fighting 51 | March 21, 2026 | 1 | 4:39 | Wichita Falls, Texas, United States | Won the Peak Fighting Middleweight Championship. |
| Loss | 14–7 | Emiliano Sordi | Decision (unanimous) | Gamebred Barekunckle MMA 4 | May 5, 2023 | 3 | 5:00 | Fort Lauderdale, Florida, United States | Bare Knuckle MMA. |
| Win | 14–6 | Chase Gamble | Submission (rear-naked choke) | Action Fight League: Invincible 2023 | January 20, 2023 | 1 | 2:10 | Hollywood, Florida, United States | |
| Win | 13–6 | Filipe Moitinho | Submission (guillotine choke) | Thunder Fight 33 | December 19, 2021 | 1 | 0:33 | São Bernardo do Campo, Brazil | Return to Middleweight. |
| Loss | 12–6 | Zac Pauga | Decision (unanimous) | Cage Warriors 130 | October 17, 2021 | 3 | 5:00 | San Diego, California, United States | Light Heavyweight debut. |
| Loss | 12–5 | Dalcha Lungiambula | Decision (unanimous) | UFC on ESPN: Magny vs. Chiesa | January 20, 2021 | 3 | 5:00 | Abu Dhabi, United Arab Emirates | |
| Loss | 12–4 | Dricus du Plessis | KO (punches) | UFC Fight Night: Moraes vs. Sandhagen | October 11, 2020 | 1 | 3:22 | Abu Dhabi, United Arab Emirates | |
| Loss | 12–3 | Wellington Turman | Decision (unanimous) | UFC Fight Night: Błachowicz vs. Jacaré | November 16, 2019 | 3 | 5:00 | São Paulo, Brazil | |
| Win | 12–2 | Anthony Hernandez | Technical Submission (anaconda choke) | UFC Fight Night: Assunção vs. Moraes 2 | February 2, 2019 | 2 | 1:07 | Fortaleza, Brazil | |
| Loss | 11–2 | Andrew Sanchez | Decision (unanimous) | UFC Fight Night: Gaethje vs. Vick | August 25, 2018 | 3 | 5:00 | Lincoln, Nebraska, United States | |
| Win | 11–1 | James Bochnovic | Submission (rear-naked choke) | UFC 224 | May 12, 2018 | 1 | 4:28 | Rio de Janeiro, Brazil | |
| Loss | 10–1 | Eryk Anders | Decision (unanimous) | UFC Fight Night: Swanson vs. Ortega | December 9, 2017 | 3 | 5:00 | Fresno, California, United States | |
| Win | 10–0 | Ian Heinisch | Submission (arm-triangle choke) | LFA 22 | September 8, 2017 | 1 | 2:14 | Broomfield, Colorado, United States | Won the vacant LFA Middleweight Championship. |
| Win | 9–0 | Ildemar Alcântara | Decision (unanimous) | Arzalet Fighting Globe 1 | February 10, 2017 | 1 | 2:14 | São Paulo, Brazil | |
| Win | 8–0 | Paulo Thiago | Decision (unanimous) | Thunder Fight 7 | June 25, 2016 | 5 | 5:00 | São Paulo, Brazil | Won the inaugural Thunder Fight Middleweight Championship. |
| Win | 7–0 | Fabricio Almeida Gonçalves | KO (spinning back elbow) | Aspera FC 38 | May 27, 2016 | 3 | 0:34 | São Paulo, Brazil | |
| Win | 6–0 | Anderson Melo | TKO (punches) | Battle of Kings 1 | December 5, 2015 | 1 | 1:27 | Ilhéus, Brazil | Welterweight bout. |
| Win | 5–0 | Rafael Silva | Submission (rear-naked choke) | Thunder Fight 2 | December 19, 2014 | 1 | 2:42 | São Paulo, Brazil | |
| Win | 4–0 | Giovani Colombo | Submission (arm-triangle choke) | Interior Fight: Fight For Your Destiny | October 26, 2013 | 1 | 0:30 | São Paulo, Brazil | Middleweight debut. |
| Win | 3–0 | Bruno da Silva | Submission (kneebar) | Jungle Fight 58 | September 14, 2013 | 1 | 3:17 | São Paulo, Brazil | |
| Win | 2–0 | Marcelo Matias | Decision (unanimous) | Reborn Strike Fight 5 | August 24, 2013 | 3 | 5:00 | São Paulo, Brazil | |
| Win | 1–0 | Rene Pessoa | TKO (punches) | Pegada Magazine: Desafio Revista Pegada | April 18, 2013 | 2 | 3:29 | São Paulo, Brazil | Welterweight debut. |

== Professional boxing record ==
| 2 fights | 2 wins | 0 losses |
|---|---|---|
| By knockout | 2 | 0 |

| Result | Record | Opponent | Type | Round, time | Date | Location | Notes |
|---|---|---|---|---|---|---|---|
| Win | 2–0 | Jay Dabelus | KO | 1 (4), 1:31 | Apr 27, 2024 | Miami, Florida, U.S. | |
| Win | 1–0 | Joe Riggs | TKO (ankle injury) | 3 (6), 1:19 | Apr 1, 2023 | Fiserv Forum, Milwaukee, Wisconsin, U.S. | |

== Karate Combat record ==
Professional record breakdown
| 5 matches | 3 wins | 2 losses |
| By knockout | 1 | 0 |
| By decision | 2 | 2 |

| Res. | Record | Opponent | Method | Event | Date | Round | Time | Location | Notes |
|---|---|---|---|---|---|---|---|---|---|
| Loss | 3–2 | Vitor Costa | Decision (unanimous) | Karate Combat 59 | February 13, 2026 | 3 | 3:00 | Miami, Florida, United States | |
| Win | 3–1 | Wallace Lopes | Decision (unanimous) | Karate Combat 58 | December 5, 2025 | 3 | 3:00 | Doral, Florida, United States | |
| Loss | 2–1 | Uriah Hall | Decision (unanimous) | Karate Combat 57 | October 31, 2025 | 4 | 3:00 | Miami, Florida, United States | |
| Win | 2–0 | Artur Alibulatov | TKO (punches) | Karate Combat 50 | October 11, 2024 | 3 | 1:51 | Salt Lake City, Utah, United States | |
| Win | 1–0 | Bam Morris | Decision (unanimous) | Karate Combat 46 | May 30, 2024 | 3 | 3:00 | Austin, Texas, United States | |

== See also ==
- List of male mixed martial artists
