= UFC Fight Night: Hermansson vs. Cannonier =

UFC mixed martial arts event in 2019

- The poster for UFC Fight Night: Hermansson vs. Cannonier
- Promotion: Ultimate Fighting Championship
- Date: September 28, 2019
- Venue: Royal Arena
- City: Copenhagen, Denmark
- Attendance: 12,767
- Total gate: $1,600,000

Event chronology
UFC Fight Night: Rodríguez vs. Stephens	UFC Fight Night: Hermansson vs. Cannonier	UFC 243: Whittaker vs. Adesanya

UFC Fight Night: Hermansson vs. Cannonier (also known as UFC Fight Night 160 or UFC on ESPN+ 18) was a mixed martial arts event produced by the Ultimate Fighting Championship that took place on September 28, 2019 at Royal Arena in Copenhagen, Denmark.

== Background ==
The event marked the promotion's first visit to Denmark marking the 25th country.

A middleweight bout between Jack Hermansson and Jared Cannonier served as the event headliner.

Danny Henry was briefly linked to a featherweight bout with Mike Davis at the event. However, Henry pulled out of the bout for undisclosed reasons in mid-September. In turn, Davis was pulled from the card and is expected to be rescheduled for a future event.

Former UFC Welterweight Championship challenger Thiago Alves was scheduled to face Gunnar Nelson at the event. However, Alves pulled out of the fight in mid-September due to an undisclosed injury. He was replaced by Gilbert Burns.

A middleweight bout between Alessio Di Chirico and Peter Sobotta was scheduled for the event. However, Sobotta was forced out of the bout and was replaced by promotional newcomer Makhmud Muradov.

== Results ==
Main Card (ESPN+)
Weight class				Method	Round	Time	Notes
Middleweight	Jared Cannonier	def.	Jack Hermansson	TKO (punches)	2	0:27
Lightweight	Mark Madsen	def.	Danilo Belluardo	TKO (punches)	1	1:12
Welterweight	Gilbert Burns	def.	Gunnar Nelson	Decision (unanimous) (29–28, 29–28, 29–28)	3	5:00
Light Heavyweight	Ion Cuțelaba	def.	Khalil Rountree Jr.	TKO (elbows)	1	2:35
Light Heavyweight	Ovince Saint Preux	def.	Michał Oleksiejczuk	Submission (Von Flue choke)	2	2:14
Welterweight	Nicolas Dalby	def.	Alex Oliveira	Decision (unanimous) (29–28, 29–28, 29–28)	3	5:00
Preliminary Card (ESPN+)
Middleweight	John Phillips	def.	Alen Amedovski	KO (punches)	1	0:17
Middleweight	Makhmud Muradov	def.	Alessio Di Chirico	Decision (unanimous) (29–28, 29–28, 29–28)	3	5:00
Welterweight	Ismail Naurdiev	def.	Siyar Bahadurzada	Decision (unanimous) (30–26, 30–25, 30–25)	3	5:00
Featherweight	Giga Chikadze	def.	Brandon Davis	Decision (split) (29–28, 28–29, 29–28)	3	5:00	(Note: Originally announced as a draw, corrected later in the broadcast.)
Women's Bantamweight	Lina Länsberg	def.	Macy Chiasson	Decision (unanimous) (29–27, 29–27, 29–28)	3	5:00
Lightweight	Marc Diakiese	def.	Lando Vannata	Decision (unanimous) (30–27, 30–27, 30–26)	3	5:00
Bantamweight	Jack Shore	def.	Nohelin Hernandez	Submission (rear-naked choke)	3	2:51

== Bonus awards ==
The following fighters received $50,000 bonuses.

- Fight of the Night: No bonus awarded.
- Performance of the Night: Jared Cannonier, Ovince Saint Preux, John Phillips and Jack Shore

== See also ==
- List of UFC events
- 2019 in UFC
- List of current UFC fighters
