= Andrew Sanchez =

American mixed martial arts fighter (born 1988)

- Born: Andrew Sanchez; April 8, 1988 (age 38); Shiloh, Illinois, U.S.
- Other names: El Dirte
- Height: 6 ft 1 in (185 cm)
- Weight: 205 lb (93 kg; 14.6 st)
- Division: Middleweight; Light Heavyweight
- Reach: 73 in (185 cm)
- Stance: Orthodox
- Fighting out of: St. Louis, Missouri, U.S.
- Team: Tristar Gym
- Wrestling: NAIA Wrestling
- Years active: 2012–present

Mixed martial arts record
- Total: 24
- Wins: 14
- By knockout: 6
- By submission: 2
- By decision: 6
- Losses: 10
- By knockout: 8
- By decision: 2

Other information
- University: McKendree University
- Mixed martial arts record from Sherdog

Andrew William Sanchez (born April 8, 1988) is an American professional mixed martial artist who competes in the Light heavyweight division. A professional competitor since 2012, he has formerly competed for the Ultimate Fighting Championship (UFC), Professional Fighters League (PFL), and Resurrection Fighting Alliance.

== Background ==
Sanchez started training in various forms of martial arts as a teenager. He was a two-time NAIA national champion wrestler at McKendree University and was named the 2011 NAIA Wrestler of the Year. He graduated in 2011 with a degree in sociology.

== Mixed martial arts career ==
Sanchez began fighting professionally in 2012 where he compiled a record of 7–2 on the regional circuit.

=== The Ultimate Fighter ===
He was added as one of the 16 Light Heavyweight fighters invited to the cast The Ultimate Fighter 23.

He won his entry fight against Phil Hawes via unanimous decision. Next up, he defeated Myron Dennis via unanimous decision.

In the semifinals, he defeated Eric Spicely by knockout in the first round.

=== Ultimate Fighting Championship ===
Sanchez made his promotional debut on July 8, 2016, at UFC The Ultimate Fighter 23 Finale in the Light Heavyweight finals against Khalil Rountree. He won the one-sided fight via unanimous decision with the score card of (30-25, 30–25, 30–26).

Sanchez next faced Trevor Smith in a middleweight bout on December 9, 2016, at UFC Fight Night 102. He won the fight by unanimous decision.

Sanchez faced Anthony Smith on April 15, 2017, at UFC on Fox 24. He lost the fight via knockout due to a combination of knee and punches in the third round.

Sanchez faced Ryan Janes on December 1, 2017, at The Ultimate Fighter 26 Finale. He lost the fight via TKO in the third round.

Sanchez was expected to face Antonio Braga Neto on August 25, 2018, at UFC Fight Night 135. However, Neto was removed from the bout on August 2 for undisclosed personal issues and replaced by Markus Perez. Sanchez won the fight via unanimous decision.

Sanchez faced promotional newcomer Marc-André Barriault on May 4, 2019, at UFC Fight Night 151. He won the fight via unanimous decision.

Sanchez was scheduled to face David Branch on September 14, 2019, at UFC on ESPN+ 16. However, it was reported that Branch was forced to pull from the event due to injury and he was replaced by Marvin Vettori. However, it was reported that Sanchez was forced to pull from the event due to an eye infection, resulting in the cancellation of the bout. In turn, the pairing was left intact and eventually took place a month later at UFC on ESPN+ 19. Sanchez lost the fight via unanimous decision.

Sanchez was scheduled to face Zak Cummings on April 25, 2020. Due to the COVID-19 pandemic, UFC president Dana White announced on April 9 that the event was indefinitely postponed.

Sanchez faced Wellington Turman on August 8, 2020, at UFC Fight Night 174. He won the fight via knockout in the first round. This win earned him the Performance of the Night award.

Sanchez was scheduled to face André Muniz on January 24, 2021 at UFC 257. In late December, Muniz withdrew due to an injury and he was replaced by Makhmud Muradov. Sanchez lost the fight via technical knockout in round three.

Sanchez faced Bruno Silva on October 16, 2021, at UFC Fight Night 195. Sanchez lost the fight via technical knockout in round three.

On October 28, 2021, it was announced that Sanchez was no longer on the UFC roster.

=== Eagle Fighting Championship ===
Sanchez faced Gabriel Checco on May 20, 2022, at Eagle FC 47. He won the fight via unanimous decision.

=== Professional Fighters League ===
Stepping in for a suspended fighter, Sanchez entered the 2023 season against Taylor Johnson on June 8, 2023 at PFL 4. He won the fight via split decision.

Sanchez was scheduled to face Karl Albrektsson, replacing Ibragim Chuzhigaev on June 21, 2024, at PFL 5. Subsequently, Sanchez stepped in to face 2022 PFL welterweight winner Sadibou Sy after Tom Breese withdrew at the last minute and the bout against Albrektsson was cancelled. He lost the fight via TKO in the third round.

Sanchez faced Impa Kasanganay on August 21, 2025, at PFL 10. He lost the bout via technical knockout in the third round.

== Championships and accomplishments ==
=== Professional titles ===
- Ultimate Fighting Championship
  - The Ultimate Fighter 23 Light Heavyweight Tournament Winner
  - Performance of the Night (One time) vs Wellington Turman
  - UFC.com Awards
    - 2016: Ranked #9 Newcomer of the Year

== Mixed martial arts record ==
Professional record breakdown
24 matches	14 wins	10 losses
By knockout	6	8
By submission	2	0
By decision	6	2

Res.	Record	Opponent	Method	Event	Date	Round	Time	Location	Notes
Loss	14–10	Mikhail Ragozin	KO (punches)	Desert Force: Uncaged	October 30, 2026	1	0:57	Amman, Jordan	
Loss	14–9	Impa Kasanganay	TKO (punches)	PFL 10 (2025)	August 21, 2025	3	4:31	Hollywood, Florida, United States	Return to Middleweight.
Loss	14–8	Sadibou Sy	TKO (punches)	PFL 5 (2024)	June 21, 2024	3	4:02	Salt Lake City, Utah, United States	
Win	14–7	Taylor Johnson	Decision (split)	PFL 4 (2023)	June 8, 2023	3	5:00	Atlanta, Georgia, United States	Johnson was deducted one point in round 1 due to an illegal knee.
Win	13–7	Gabriel Checco	Decision (unanimous)	Eagle FC 47	May 20, 2022	3	5:00	Miami, Florida, United States	Return to Light Heavyweight.
Loss	12–7	Bruno Silva	TKO (punches)	UFC Fight Night: Ladd vs. Dumont	October 16, 2021	3	2:35	Las Vegas, Nevada, United States	
Loss	12–6	Makhmud Muradov	TKO (flying knee and punches)	UFC 257	January 24, 2021	3	2:59	Abu Dhabi, United Arab Emirates	
Win	12–5	Wellington Turman	KO (punch)	UFC Fight Night: Lewis vs. Oleinik	August 8, 2020	1	4:14	Las Vegas, Nevada, United States	Performance of the Night.
Loss	11–5	Marvin Vettori	Decision (unanimous)	UFC Fight Night: Joanna vs. Waterson	October 12, 2019	3	5:00	Tampa, Florida, United States	
Win	11–4	Marc-André Barriault	Decision (unanimous)	UFC Fight Night: Iaquinta vs. Cowboy	May 4, 2019	3	5:00	Ottawa, Ontario, Canada	
Win	10–4	Markus Perez	Decision (unanimous)	UFC Fight Night: Gaethje vs. Vick	August 25, 2018	3	5:00	Lincoln, Nebraska, United States	
Loss	9–4	Ryan Janes	TKO (punches)	The Ultimate Fighter: A New World Champion Finale	December 1, 2017	3	0:59	Las Vegas, Nevada, United States	
Loss	9–3	Anthony Smith	KO (head kick and punches)	UFC on Fox: Johnson vs. Reis	April 9, 2017	3	3:52	Kansas City, Missouri, United States	
Win	9–2	Trevor Smith	Decision (unanimous)	UFC Fight Night: Lewis vs. Abdurakhimov	December 9, 2016	3	5:00	Albany, New York, United States	Return to Middleweight.
Win	8–2	Khalil Rountree Jr.	Decision (unanimous)	The Ultimate Fighter: Team Joanna vs. Team Cláudia Finale	July 8, 2016	3	5:00	Las Vegas, Nevada, United States	Won The Ultimate Fighter 23 Light Heavyweight Tournament.
Win	7–2	John Poppie	TKO (spinning back fist and punches)	RFA 28	August 7, 2015	3	1:53	St. Louis, Missouri, United States	Won the vacant RFA Middleweight Championship.
Win	6–2	Clinton Williams	TKO (punches)	RFA 26	June 5, 2015	2	1:17	Broomfield, Colorado, United States	
Loss	5–2	Kevin Casey	KO (punches)	RFA 15	June 6, 2014	1	2:30	Los Angeles, California, United States	For the vacant RFA Middleweight Championship.
Win	5–1	Miles Marshall	TKO (punches)	RFA 13	March 7, 2014	2	1:25	Lincoln, Nebraska, United States	
Win	4–1	Todd Meredith	TKO (punches)	RFA 11	November 22, 2013	1	1:51	Broomfield, Colorado, United States	
Loss	3–1	Dustin Jacoby	Decision (split)	Capital City Cage Wars: The Uprising	March 2, 2013	3	5:00	Springfield, Illinois, United States	
Win	3–0	Thomas Jones	TKO (punches)	TTP: Tommy Tran Promotions	November 17, 2012	1	2:57	Branson, Missouri, United States	
Win	2–0	Darryl Cobb	Submission (rear-naked choke)	FHMMA: Fight Hard MMA	August 18, 2012	1	4:33	St. Charles, Missouri, United States	
Win	1–0	Edward Smith	Submission (rear-naked choke)	CC 38: Cage Championships 38	June 23, 2012	1	1:42	Sullivan, Missouri, United States	

Exhibition record breakdown		
3 matches	3 wins	0 losses
By knockout	1	0
By decision	2	0

Res.	Record	Opponent	Method	Event	Date	Round	Time	Location	Notes
Win	3–0	Eric Spicely	KO (punches)	The Ultimate Fighter: Team Joanna vs. Team Cláudia	March 1, 2016	1	0:47	Las Vegas, Nevada, United States	The Ultimate Fighter 23 Semifinal round.
Win	2–0	Myron Dennis	Decision (unanimous)	The Ultimate Fighter: Team Joanna vs. Team Cláudia	February 9, 2016	2	5:00	Las Vegas, Nevada, United States	The Ultimate Fighter 23 Quarterfinal round.
Win	1–0	Phil Hawes	Decision (unanimous)	The Ultimate Fighter: Team Joanna vs. Team Cláudia	January 26, 2016	2	5:00	Las Vegas, Nevada, United States	The Ultimate Fighter 23 Elimination round

== See also ==
- List of male mixed martial artists
