= UFC Fight Night: Lewis vs. Abdurakhimov =

UFC mixed martial arts event in 2016

- The poster for UFC Fight Night: Lewis vs. Abdurakhimov
- Promotion: Ultimate Fighting Championship
- Date: December 9, 2016
- Venue: Times Union Center
- City: Albany, New York
- Attendance: 6,216
- Total gate: $411,000

Event chronology
The Ultimate Fighter: Tournament of Champions Finale	UFC Fight Night: Lewis vs. Abdurakhimov	UFC 206: Holloway vs. Pettis

UFC Fight Night: Lewis vs. Abdurakhimov (also known as UFC Fight Night 102) was a mixed martial arts event held by the Ultimate Fighting Championship on December 9, 2016, at Times Union Center in Albany, New York

== Background ==
This event was the first that the organization hosted in Albany.

A heavyweight bout between Derrick Lewis and Shamil Abdurakhimov served as the event headliner.

A middleweight bout between Josh Samman and Oluwale Bamgbose was briefly linked to the event. However the pairing never materialized as Samman died on October 5, 2016. Joe Gigliotti was tabbed as his replacement. In turn, Bamgbose pulled out of the fight in mid-November citing an injury and was replaced by promotional newcomer Gerald Meerschaert.

Promotional newcomer Charlie Ward was expected to face Randy Brown at the event. However, Ward was pulled from the event in early November due to alleged visa issues which restricted his travel and was replaced by fellow newcomer Brian Camozzi.

Zubaira Tukhugov was scheduled to face Tiago Trator at the event. However, on November 14, Tukhugov was pulled from the card after being notified by USADA of a potential anti-doping violation stemming from an out-of-competition sample collected earlier. On November 28, Tukhugov was replaced by promotional newcomer Shane Burgos.

Aljamain Sterling was expected to face Raphael Assunção at the event. However, Sterling pulled out of the fight on November 23 citing injury. Assunção was subsequently removed from the card with the pairing expected to be rescheduled for a future event.

The Ultimate Fighter: Team Joanna vs. Team Cláudia women's strawweight winner Tatiana Suarez was expected to face Juliana Lima at the event. However, Suarez pulled out of the fight on November 23 citing injury. She was replaced on December 2 by promotional newcomer JJ Aldrich.

Patrick Cummins was expected to face Gian Villante at the event. However, Cummins pulled out of the fight on December 2 citing a staph infection. He was replaced by promotional newcomer Saparbek Safarov.

At the weigh-ins, Justine Kish came in at 116.4 lb, 0.4 lb over the women's strawweight limit of 116 lb. As a result, Kish was fined 20% of her purse, which went to her opponent Ashley Yoder and the bout proceeded as scheduled at a catchweight.

== Results ==
Main Card (UFC Fight Pass)
Weight class				Method	Round	Time	Notes
Heavyweight	Derrick Lewis	def.	Shamil Abdurakhimov	TKO (punches)	4	3:42
Heavyweight	Francis Ngannou	def.	Anthony Hamilton	Submission (kimura)	1	1:57
Light Heavyweight	Corey Anderson	def.	Sean O'Connell	TKO (punches)	2	2:36
Light Heavyweight	Gian Villante	def.	Saparbek Safarov	TKO (punches and elbows)	2	2:54
Preliminary Card (UFC Fight Pass)
Catchweight (116.4 lb)	Justine Kish	def.	Ashley Yoder	Decision (unanimous) (29–28, 29–28, 29–28)	3	5:00
Welterweight	Randy Brown	def.	Brian Camozzi	TKO (knee and punches)	2	1:25
Middleweight	Gerald Meerschaert	def.	Joe Gigliotti	Submission (anaconda choke)	1	4:12
Middleweight	Andrew Sanchez	def.	Trevor Smith	Decision (unanimous) (30–27, 30–27, 30–27)	3	5:00
Featherweight	Shane Burgos	def.	Tiago Trator	Decision (unanimous) (30–26, 29–28, 29–27)	3	5:00
Lightweight	Marc Diakiese	def.	Frankie Perez	Decision (unanimous) (29–28, 29–28, 29–28)	3	5:00
Middleweight	Ryan Janes	def.	Keith Berish	Decision (unanimous) (29–28, 29–28, 29–28)	3	5:00
Women's Strawweight	Juliana Lima	def.	JJ Aldrich	Decision (unanimous) (30–27, 30–27, 30–27)	3	5:00

== Bonus awards ==
The following fighters were awarded $50,000 bonuses:

- Fight of the Night: Gian Villante vs. Saparbek Safarov
- Performance of the Night: Francis Ngannou and Gerald Meerschaert

== See also ==
- List of UFC events
- 2016 in UFC
- Mixed martial arts in New York
