= Shamil Abdurakhimov =

Russian mixed martial arts fighter

Shamil Abdurakhimov Шамиль Абдурахимов
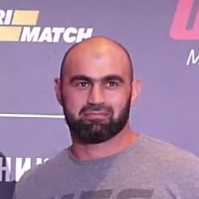
- Born: September 2, 1981 (age 45); Makhachkala, Dagestan ASSR, Russian SFSR, Soviet Union
- Nickname: Abrek
- Nationality: Russian
- Height: 6 ft 3 in (1.91 m)
- Weight: 263 lb (119 kg; 19 st)
- Division: Heavyweight
- Reach: 76 in (193 cm)
- Style: Wushu Sanda, Freestyle Wrestling, Kickboxing
- Fighting out of: Makhachkala, Dagestan, Russia
- Team: Fighting Eagle
- Trainer: Kickboxing: Magomed Magomedov
- Rank: National Master of Sports in Wushu Sanda; International Master of Sports in Kickboxing
- Years active: 2008—2023

Mixed martial arts record
- Total: 28
- Wins: 20
- By knockout: 9
- By submission: 4
- By decision: 7
- Losses: 8
- By knockout: 6
- By submission: 1
- By decision: 1

Other information
- Mixed martial arts record from Sherdog

External image
- Shamil Abdurakhimov

Shamil Gentovich Abdurakhimov (born September 2, 1981) is a Russian former mixed martial artist, who competed in the heavyweight division. He formerly competed for the Ultimate Fighting Championship (UFC).

== Background ==
Abdurakhimov was born on September 2, 1981, in Kuyada village, Gunibsky District, Dagestan in a family of Avar descent. He started training in Sanshou, Boxing and Freestyle wrestling in primary school. After his military service he became a Sanshou national champion in Russia.

== Mixed martial arts career ==
=== Abu Dhabi Fighting Championship ===
On May 14, 2010, at ADFC: Battle of the Champions, he fought Jeff Monson and won via majority decision.

Abdurakhimov fought Sokoudjou on October 22, 2010, at ADFC: Round 2. He won via TKO (punches) in the third round.

In his last fight with the ADFC, Abdurakhimov faced Marcos Oliveira at ADFC: Round 3. He won via TKO (punches) in the first round. The win also earned him the ADFC heavyweight belt and one million dirham ($272,000).

=== Ultimate Fighting Championship ===
On January 15, 2015, he signed a contract with the UFC.

In his debut, Abdurakhimov faced Timothy Johnson on April 4, 2015, at UFC Fight Night 63 He lost the fight via TKO in the first round.

Abdurakhimov faced Anthony Hamilton on February 21, 2016, at UFC Fight Night 83. He won the fight by unanimous decision.

Abdurakhimov next faced Walt Harris on October 1, 2016, at UFC Fight Night 96. He won the fight via split decision.

Abdurakhimov faced Derrick Lewis on December 9, 2016, in the main event at UFC Fight Night 102. After winning the first three rounds, he lost the fight by TKO in the fourth round.

Abdurakhimov faced Chase Sherman on 25 November 2017 at UFC Fight Night 122. He won the fight via knockout in the first round.

Abdurakhimov faced Andrei Arlovski on September 15, 2018, at UFC Fight Night 136. He won the fight by unanimous decision.

Abdurakhimov faced Marcin Tybura on April 20, 2019, at UFC Fight Night 149. He won the fight via TKO in the second round.

Abdurakhimov faced Curtis Blaydes on September 7, 2019, at UFC 242. He lost the fight via TKO in the second round.

Abdurakhimov was scheduled to face Ciryl Gane on April 18, 2020, at UFC 249. However, on March 5, 2020, it was announced that Gane was forced to pull out from the event due to struck by pneumothorax during one of his trainings. The bout was eventually rescheduled for July 11, 2020, at UFC 251. Subsequently, the pairing was cancelled a second time and scrapped from this event in mid-June as Abdurakhimov was removed from the bout for undisclosed reasons. The pair was rescheduled on September 26, 2020, at UFC 253. However, the bout was rescheduled again to UFC Fight Night 180 on October 18, 2020. The bout fell through once again as Abdurakhimov pulled out due to undisclosed reasons on September 28, 2020, and he was replaced by promotional newcomer Ante Delija.

Abdurakhimov was scheduled to face Augusto Sakai on May 1, 2021, at UFC on ESPN 23. However, Abdurakhimov was removed from the bout in mid-April due to alleged visa issues that restricted his travel.

Abdurakhimov was scheduled to face Chris Daukaus at UFC on ESPN: Sandhagen vs. Dillashaw, but the matchup was removed from that card on July 19 due to COVID-19 protocols within Abdurakhimov's camp. The pair remained intact and was scheduled at UFC on ESPN: Hall vs. Strickland on July 31, 2021. However, the bout was postponed for unknown reasons to UFC 266. Abdurakhimov lost the fight via technical knockout in round two.

Abdurakhimov was scheduled to face Tom Aspinall on March 19, 2022, at UFC Fight Night 204. However, Aspinall was pulled from the bout and he was replaced by Sergei Pavlovich. He lost the fight via technical knockout in round one.

Abdurakhimov was scheduled to face Jailton Almeida on September 10, 2022, at UFC 279. However, Abdurakhimov was forced to withdraw due to visa issues. The pair was rescheduled for UFC 280 on October 22, 2022. With that date also falling through, the pair was re-booked for a third time at UFC 283. He lost the fight via technical knockout in the second round.

After the loss, it was announced that Abdurakhimov was no longer on the UFC roster.

== Championships and accomplishments ==
=== Mixed Martial Arts ===
- Abu Dhabi Fighting Championship
  - ADFC World Heavyweight Champion

=== Sanshou ===
- Russian Sanshou Federation
  - Five Time Russian National Champion

== Mixed martial arts record ==
Professional record breakdown
28 matches	20 wins	8 losses
By knockout	9	6
By submission	4	1
By decision	7	1

Res.	Record	Opponent	Method	Event	Date	Round	Time	Location	Notes
Loss	20–8	Jailton Almeida	TKO (punches)	UFC 283	January 21, 2023	2	2:56	Rio de Janeiro, Brazil	
Loss	20–7	Sergei Pavlovich	TKO (punches)	UFC Fight Night: Volkov vs. Aspinall	March 19, 2022	1	4:03	London, England	
Loss	20–6	Chris Daukaus	TKO (punches and elbows)	UFC 266	September 25, 2021	2	1:23	Las Vegas, Nevada, United States	
Loss	20–5	Curtis Blaydes	TKO (elbow and punch)	UFC 242	September 7, 2019	2	2:22	Abu Dhabi, United Arab Emirates	
Win	20–4	Marcin Tybura	TKO (punches)	UFC Fight Night: Overeem vs. Oleinik	April 20, 2019	2	3:15	Saint Petersburg, Russia	
Win	19–4	Andrei Arlovski	Decision (unanimous)	UFC Fight Night: Hunt vs. Oleinik	September 15, 2018	3	5:00	Moscow, Russia	
Win	18–4	Chase Sherman	KO (punches)	UFC Fight Night: Bisping vs. Gastelum	November 25, 2017	1	1:24	Shanghai, China	
Loss	17–4	Derrick Lewis	TKO (punches)	UFC Fight Night: Lewis vs. Abdurakhimov	December 9, 2016	4	3:42	Albany, New York, United States	
Win	17–3	Walt Harris	Decision (split)	UFC Fight Night: Lineker vs. Dodson	October 1, 2016	3	5:00	Portland, Oregon, United States	
Win	16–3	Anthony Hamilton	Decision (unanimous)	UFC Fight Night: Cowboy vs. Cowboy	February 21, 2016	3	5:00	Pittsburgh, Pennsylvania, United States	
Loss	15–3	Timothy Johnson	TKO (punches)	UFC Fight Night: Mendes vs. Lamas	April 4, 2015	1	4:57	Fairfax, Virginia, United States	Abdurakhimov was deducted one point in round 1 due to grabbing the fence.
Win	15–2	Kenny Garner	Decision (unanimous)	M-1 Challenge 49	June 7, 2014	3	5:00	Ingushetia, Russia	
Win	14–2	Neil Grove	Decision (unanimous)	Tech-Krep FC: Southern Front 2	October 4, 2013	3	5:00	Krasnodar, Russia	
Win	13–2	Jerry Otto	Submission (keylock)	ProFC 40	April 1, 2012	1	1:46	Volgograd, Russia	
Loss	12–2	Tony Lopez	Submission (triangle choke)	World Ultimate Full Contact: Call of Champions	December 24, 2011	3	1:54	Makhachkala, Russia	
Win	12–1	Marcos Oliveira	TKO (punches)	Abu Dhabi FC 3	March 11, 2011	3	2:17	Abu Dhabi, United Arab Emirates	Won the ADFC Heavyweight Grand Prix.
Win	11–1	Rameau Thierry Sokoudjou	TKO (punches)	Abu Dhabi FC 2	October 22, 2010	3	2:17	Abu Dhabi, United Arab Emirates	ADFC Heavyweight Grand Prix Semifinal.
Win	10–1	Jeff Monson	Decision (majority)	Abu Dhabi FC 1	May 14, 2010	3	5:00	Abu Dhabi, United Arab Emirates	ADFC Heavyweight Grand Prix Quarterfinal.
Win	9–1	Shamil Abdulmuslimov	TKO (punches)	ProFC 15	April 23, 2010	1	1:41	Moscow, Russia	
Win	8–1	Mikhail Rutskiv	Submission (armbar)	ProFC 14	March 19, 2010	1	1:39	Rostov-on-Don, Russia	
Win	7–1	Baga Agaev	Decision (unanimous)	ProFC 11	December 19, 2009	2	5:00	Rostov-on-Don, Russia	
Loss	6–1	Thiago Santos	Decision (unanimous)	Union of Veterans: Cup of Champions 2009	November 27, 2009	3	5:00	Novosibirsk, Russia	2009 Union of Veterans Heavyweight Tournament Quarterfinal.
Win	6–0	Roman Savochka	TKO (corner stoppage)	ProFC 9	September 25, 2009	2	1:47	Rostov-on-Don, Russia	
Win	5–0	Roman Mirzoyan	Submission (armbar)	ProFC 8	August 21, 2009	1	3:30	Rostov-on-Don, Russia	
Win	4–0	Vitalii Yalovenko	KO (punches)	ProFC 7	July 4, 2009	1	1:39	Rostov-on-Don, Russia	
Win	3–0	Ante Maljkovic	TKO (punches)	ProFC 5	March 29, 2009	1	1:17	Rostov-on-Don, Russia	
Win	2–0	Gabriel Garcia	TKO (punches)	Fight Force 2	February 18, 2009	1	0:57	Saint Petersburg, Russia	
Win	1–0	Vladimir Kuchenko	Submission (kimura)	Fight Force 1	April 19, 2008	1	N/A	Saint Petersburg, Russia	Heavyweight debut.
