= T. J. Cook =

American mixed martial arts fighter

- Born: Thomas Jones Cook; September 8, 1982 (age 44); Ocala, Florida, United States
- Height: 5 ft 11 in (1.80 m)
- Weight: 204 lb (93 kg; 14.6 st)
- Division: Heavyweight; Light Heavyweight; Middleweight
- Reach: 71.5 in (182 cm)
- Fighting out of: Belleview, Florida, United States
- Team: American Top Team
- Years active: 2003-2012; 2017

Professional boxing record
- Total: 2
- Wins: 1
- By knockout: 1
- Losses: 1
- By knockout: 1

Mixed martial arts record
- Total: 18
- Wins: 13
- By knockout: 10
- By submission: 2
- By decision: 1
- Losses: 5
- By knockout: 1
- By submission: 4

Other information
- Boxing record from BoxRec
- Mixed martial arts record from Sherdog

T. J. Cook (born September 8, 1982) is a retired American mixed martial artist and boxer. A professional MMA competitor from 2003 until 2017, he fought in Strikeforce.

== Mixed martial arts career ==
=== Early career ===
Cook started his career in 2003. He fought only for southeastern US promotions. With a MMA record of 11-3, he signed with Strikeforce.

=== Strikeforce ===
Cook made his debut on July 22, 2011, at Strikeforce Challengers: Bowling vs. Voelker replacing an injured Guto Inocente against Lionel Lanham. He won via TKO in the first round.

Cook faced Trevor Smith on November 18, 2011, at Strikeforce Challengers: Britt vs. Sayers. He lost via submission in the first round.

Cook faced Ovince St. Preux on August 18, 2012, at Strikeforce: Rousey vs. Kaufman. He lost via KO in the third round.

== Professional boxing ==
Cook competed twice as a professional Cruiserweight boxer, holding a record of 1-1.

== Mixed martial arts record ==
Professional record breakdown
18 matches	13 wins	5 losses
By knockout	10	1
By submission	2	4
By decision	1	0

Res.	Record	Opponent	Method	Event	Date	Round	Time	Location	Notes
Win	13–5	Ronnie Phillips	TKO (punches)	RFC 40: Fireworks	July 21, 2017	2	2:21	Tampa, Florida, United States	
Loss	12–5	Ovince Saint Preux	KO (punch)	Strikeforce: Rousey vs. Kaufman	August 18, 2012	3	0:20	San Diego, California, United States	
Loss	12–4	Trevor Smith	Submission (guillotine choke)	Strikeforce Challengers: Britt vs. Sayers	November 18, 2011	1	4:28	Las Vegas, Nevada, United States	
Win	12–3	Lionel Lanham	TKO (punches)	Strikeforce Challengers: Voelker vs. Bowling III	July 22, 2011	1	4:59	Las Vegas, Nevada, United States	
Win	11–3	Aaron Johnson	Submission	PCB MMA: Brawl on the Beach	October 2, 2010	1	0:22	Panama City, Florida, United States	
Win	10–3	Ariel Gandulla	KO (punches)	AOF 3: Rumble at Robarts 3	July 13, 2009	3	1:00	Sarasota, Florida, United States	Won the AOF Light Heavyweight Championship.
Win	9–3	Scott Harper	TKO (punches)	XCF: Rumble in Racetown 1	February 14, 2009	1	1:37	Daytona Beach, Florida, United States	
Win	8–3	Chris Baten	Decision (unanimous)	Real Fighting Championships 12: The Comeback	May 23, 2008	3	5:00	Tampa, Florida, United States	
Loss	7–3	George Lockhart	Submission (rear-naked choke)	AFL: Eruption	March 7, 2008	2	3:03	Lexington, Kentucky, United States	
Loss	7–2	Emyr Bussade	Submission (kneebar)	RIC: Cage Fighting Championships	October 6, 2007	2	0:40	Fort Lauderdale, Florida United States	
Win	7–1	Jason Wells	TKO (doctor stoppage)	SR 2: Southern Rage 2	August 18, 2007	1	N/A	Douglas, Georgia, United States	
Loss	6–1	Bill Vucick	Submission (rear-naked choke)	WEF: World Extreme Fighting	March 23, 2007	1	4:48	Florida, United States	
Win	6–0	Jesse Chilton	TKO (knee injury)	CFC 2: Combat Fighting Championship 2	September 23, 2006	1	2:19	Orlando, Florida, United States	Won the vacant CFC Middleweight Championship.
Win	5–0	Tony Vartanian	KO (punches)	CFC 1: Combat Fighting Championship 1	July 15, 2006	1	3:34	Orlando, Florida, United States	
Win	4–0	Richard Dalton	TKO (punches)	FT 3: Full Throttle 3	July 15, 2005	1	3:03	Georgia United States	
Win	3–0	Geno Roderick	Submission (inverted triangle choke)	SI: Superfights International	March 18, 2005	1	2:27	Lakeland, Florida, United States	
Win	2–0	Matt Rogers	KO (strikes)	OC: Obaktagon Challenge 1	April 10, 2004	1	0:08	Jacksonville, Florida, United States	
Win	1–0	Freddy Ferronni	TKO (punches)	WEF: World Extreme Fighting	December 20, 2003	1	2:28	Orlando, Florida, United States	
