= Khalil Rountree Jr. =

American mixed martial artist (born 1990)

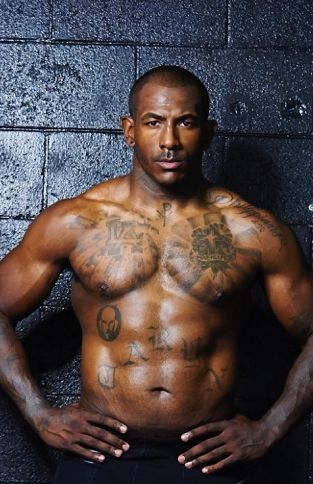
- Rountree in 2016
- Born: Khalil Ibn Rountree Jr. February 6, 1990 (age 36); Los Angeles, California, U.S.
- Other names: The War Horse
- Height: 6 ft 1 in (1.85 m)
- Weight: 205 lb (93 kg; 14 st 9 lb)
- Division: Middleweight (2015); Light Heavyweight (2014, 2016–present)
- Reach: 76 1/2 in (194 cm)
- Stance: Southpaw
- Fighting out of: Las Vegas, Nevada, U.S.
- Team: Syndicate MMA (present); Tiger Muay Thai (2019–present)
- Years active: 2010–present

Mixed martial arts record
- Total: 22
- Wins: 14
- By knockout: 9
- By decision: 5
- Losses: 7
- By knockout: 4
- By submission: 1
- By decision: 2
- No contests: 1

Other information
- Mixed martial arts record from Sherdog

Khalil Ibn Rountree Jr. (born February 6, 1990) is an American professional mixed martial artist who currently competes in the Light Heavyweight division of the Ultimate Fighting Championship (UFC). As of October 24, 2026, he is #6 in the Meta UFC light heavyweight rankings.

== Background ==
Rountree was born in Los Angeles, California. When he was two years old, his father was shot and killed in an attempted robbery while working as the tour manager for Boyz II Men. Before he started training in MMA, Rountree would avidly attend Hardcore music concerts. He stated in an interview "that was a safe space to just let out my rage because it's not okay to do it at home and do it on the streets. There was just no space for me to let out that rage, so hardcore was a safe space for me."

After one year of MMA training, Rountree started his MMA amateur career in 2011. Before his UFC 236 fight against Eryk Anders, Rountree trained in Thailand, focusing on Muay Thai.

== Mixed martial arts career ==
=== Resurrection Fighting Alliance ===
Rountree had a record of 6–1 in his amateur fights, competing as a Middleweight under the Tuff-N-Uff and King of the Cage (KOTC) banners.

Rountree made his professional debut, as a light heavyweight, with Resurrection Fighting Alliance against Livingston Lukow at RFA 15 on June 6, 2014. Rountree won the fight by unanimous decision.

Rountree was scheduled to face Blake Troop in a 190 lbs catchweight bout at RFA 21 on December 5, 2014. Rountree won the fight by a first-round knockout, after just 39 seconds.

Rountree made his middleweight debut against Cameron Olson at RFA 25 on April 10, 2015. Rountree won the fight by a unanimous decision.

Rountree made his final appearance with RFA against Justin Polendey at RFA 33 on December 11, 2015. Rountree won the fight by first-round knockout.

=== The Ultimate Fighter ===
In April 2016, Rountree competed as a fighter on The Ultimate Fighter: Team Joanna vs. Team Cláudia. In the first round, he faced Muhammed DeReese and won via knockout. In the elimination round, he faced Cory Hendricks and lost via submission in the first round.

Later in the show, Hendricks withdrew himself from the competition due to neck injury and Dana White decided to bring back Rountree for the semi-final round. Rountree moved on to faced Josh Stansbury and won via knockout in the first round to advance and face Andrew Sanchez at the finale.

=== Ultimate Fighting Championship ===
Rountree made his promotional debut on July 8, 2016, at UFC The Ultimate Fighter 23 Finale for the TUF 23 Light Heavyweight title against Andrew Sanchez. He lost the fight via unanimous decision.

Rountree next faced Tyson Pedro at UFC Fight Night 101 on November 27, 2016. He was submitted via rear-naked choke in round one.

On his third fight Rountree faced Daniel Jolly at UFC Fight Night 104 on February 4, 2017. He won via knockout in the first round.

Rountree faced Paul Craig on July 16, 2017, at UFC Fight Night 113. He won the fight via knockout in the first round.

Rountree was expected to face Gökhan Saki on December 30, 2017, at UFC 219. However, Saki was forced to pull out, citing knee injury, and was replaced by Michał Oleksiejczuk. Rountree lost the fight by unanimous decision. However, after the fight, it was revealed that Oleksiejczuk had tested positive for clomiphene, an anti-estrogenic substance. As a result, the Nevada Athletic Commission (NAC) officially overturned the result of the fight to a no contest.

The bout between Rountree and Gökhan Saki eventually took place at UFC 226 on July 7, 2018. Rountree won the fight via knockout in round one. This fight earned him the Performance of the Night award.

Rountree faced promotional newcomer Johnny Walker on November 17, 2018, at UFC Fight Night 140. He lost the fight via knockout in the first round.

Rountree faced Eryk Anders on April 13, 2019, at UFC 236. He won the fight via unanimous decision.

Rountree faced Ion Cuțelaba on September 28, 2019, at UFC Fight Night 160. He lost via TKO in the first round.

Rountree was expected to face Sam Alvey on March 28, 2020, at UFC on ESPN: Ngannou vs. Rozenstruik. Due to the COVID-19 pandemic, the event was eventually postponed.

Despite talks of retiring after the scrapped bout with Alvey, Rountree signed a contract extension with the UFC in October 2020.

Rountree faced Marcin Prachnio on January 24, 2021 at UFC 257. He lost the fight via unanimous decision.

Rountree faced Modestas Bukauskas on September 4, 2021, at UFC Fight Night 191. He won the fight via TKO in round two after catching Bukauskas with an oblique kick, marking the first time the technique had been used to finish a fight in the UFC.

Rountree faced Karl Roberson on March 12, 2022, at UFC Fight Night 203. Rountree won the fight via TKO in round two. This win earned him the Performance of the Night award.

Rountree faced Dustin Jacoby on October 29, 2022, at UFC Fight Night 213. He won the fight via split decision which people labeled as controversial. 14 out of 16 media outlets scored the bout for Jacoby.

Rountree was scheduled to face Chris Daukaus on June 10, 2023, at UFC 289. However, on June 2, 2023, it was revealed that Daukaus suffered injury and was pulled from the card. The bout with Daukaus was rescheduled for August 12, 2023 at UFC on ESPN: Luque vs. dos Anjos. Rountree won the fight via technical knockout in round one. This win earned him the Performance of the Night award.

Rountree was scheduled to face Azamat Murzakanov on December 2, 2023, at UFC on ESPN 52. However, Murzakanov suffered from symptoms related to Pneumonia and was removed from the event, and Rountree was instead booked to face Anthony Smith one week later at UFC Fight Night 233. Rountree won the fight via technical knockout in round three. This fight earned him the Performance of the Night award.

Rountree was scheduled to face former UFC Light Heavyweight champion Jamahal Hill at UFC 303 on June 29, 2024. However, Rountree was forced to withdraw from the event due to taking a banned substance, and was replaced by Carlos Ulberg. Rountree was subsequently suspended by the CSAD for 2 months from May 4 to July 4, 2024, from competing after unintentionally ingesting tainted supplements - Exogenous origin of 5a-androstanediol, 5b-androstanediol and androsterone.

Rountree faced Alex Pereira for the UFC Light Heavyweight Championship on October 5, 2024, at UFC 307. He lost the fight by technical knockout in the fourth round. This fight earned him his first Fight of the Night award.

Rountree was scheduled to face former UFC Light Heavyweight Champion Jamahal Hill on April 26, 2025, in the main event at UFC on ESPN 66. However, Hill had to withdraw due to a leg injury, so the bout was scrapped. The bout was rescheduled and headlined UFC on ABC 8 on June 21, 2025. Rountree won the fight by unanimous decision.

Rountree faced former champion Jiří Procházka on October 4, 2025 at UFC 320. He lost the fight by knockout in the third round. This fight earned him another Fight of the Night award.

Rountree was scheduled to face former light heavyweight champion Magomed Ankalaev on July 25, 2026 in the main event at UFC Fight Night 282. However, less than two weeks before the event, Rountree withdrew due to an injury and was replaced by Bogdan Guskov.

== Championships and accomplishments ==
- Ultimate Fighting Championship
  - Performance of the Night (Four times) vs. Gökhan Saki, Karl Roberson, Chris Daukaus, Anthony Smith
  - Fight of the Night (Two times) vs. Alex Pereira and Jiří Procházka
  - Tied (Dustin Jacoby, Magomed Ankalaev & Dominick Reyes) for third most knockouts in UFC Light Heavyweight division history (7)
  - Tied (Chuck Liddell & Maurício Rua) for most knockdowns landed in UFC Light Heavyweight division history (14)
  - Tied (Chuck Liddell, Lyoto Machida, Junior dos Santos, Thiago Santos & Maurício Rua) for sixth most knockdowns landed in UFC history (14)
  - Most knockdowns landed in a UFC Light Heavyweight division bout (4) (vs. Eryk Anders)
  - UFC Honors Awards
    - 2024: President's Choice Fight of the Year Nominee vs. Alex Pereira
    - 2025: President's Choice Fight of the Year Nominee vs. Jiří Procházka
  - UFC.com Awards
    - 2018: Ranked #7 Upset of the Year vs. Gökhan Saki
    - 2024: Ranked #2 Fight of the Year vs. Alex Pereira
    - 2025: Ranked #2 Fight of the Year vs. Jiří Procházka
- MMA Mania
  - 2024 #5 Ranked Fight of the Year vs. Alex Pereira at UFC 307
  - 2025 Fight of the Year vs. Jiří Procházka at UFC 320
- Cageside Press
  - 2025 Fight of the Year vs. Jiri Prochazka, tied with Van vs. Royval
- Combat Press
  - 2025 Fight of the Year vs. Jiří Procházka at UFC 320
- LowKick MMA
  - 2025 Fight of the Year vs. Jiří Procházka at UFC 320
- MMA Fighting
  - 2023 Third Team MMA All-Star
- Slacky Awards
  - 2023 Technical Turn-Around of the Year

== Mixed martial arts record ==
Professional record breakdown
22 matches	14 wins	7 losses
By knockout	9	4
By submission	0	1
By decision	5	2
No contests	1	

Res.	Record	Opponent	Method	Event	Date	Round	Time	Location	Notes
Loss	14–7 (1)	Jiří Procházka	KO (punches)	UFC 320	October 4, 2025	3	3:04	Las Vegas, Nevada, United States	Fight of the Night.
Win	14–6 (1)	Jamahal Hill	Decision (unanimous)	UFC on ABC: Hill vs. Rountree Jr.	June 21, 2025	5	5:00	Baku, Azerbaijan	
Loss	13–6 (1)	Alex Pereira	TKO (punches)	UFC 307	October 5, 2024	4	4:32	Salt Lake City, Utah, United States	For the UFC Light Heavyweight Championship. Fight of the Night.
Win	13–5 (1)	Anthony Smith	TKO (punches)	UFC Fight Night: Song vs. Gutiérrez	December 9, 2023	3	0:56	Las Vegas, Nevada, United States	Performance of the Night.
Win	12–5 (1)	Chris Daukaus	TKO (punches)	UFC on ESPN: Luque vs. dos Anjos	August 12, 2023	1	2:40	Las Vegas, Nevada, United States	Performance of the Night.
Win	11–5 (1)	Dustin Jacoby	Decision (split)	UFC Fight Night: Kattar vs. Allen	October 29, 2022	3	5:00	Las Vegas, Nevada, United States	
Win	10–5 (1)	Karl Roberson	TKO (body kick and punches)	UFC Fight Night: Santos vs. Ankalaev	March 12, 2022	2	0:25	Las Vegas, Nevada, United States	Performance of the Night.
Win	9–5 (1)	Modestas Bukauskas	TKO (leg kick)	UFC Fight Night: Brunson vs. Till	September 4, 2021	2	2:30	Las Vegas, Nevada, United States	
Loss	8–5 (1)	Marcin Prachnio	Decision (unanimous)	UFC 257	January 24, 2021	3	5:00	Abu Dhabi, United Arab Emirates	
Loss	8–4 (1)	Ion Cuțelaba	TKO (elbows)	UFC Fight Night: Hermansson vs. Cannonier	September 28, 2019	1	2:35	Copenhagen, Denmark	
Win	8–3 (1)	Eryk Anders	Decision (unanimous)	UFC 236	April 13, 2019	3	5:00	Atlanta, Georgia, United States	
Loss	7–3 (1)	Johnny Walker	KO (elbow)	UFC Fight Night: Magny vs. Ponzinibbio	November 17, 2018	1	1:57	Buenos Aires, Argentina	
Win	7–2 (1)	Gökhan Saki	TKO (punches)	UFC 226	July 7, 2018	1	1:36	Las Vegas, Nevada, United States	Performance of the Night.
NC	6–2 (1)	Michał Oleksiejczuk	NC (overturned)	UFC 219	December 30, 2017	3	5:00	Las Vegas, Nevada, United States	Originally a unanimous decision win for Oleksiejczuk; overturned after he tested positive for clomiphene.
Win	6–2	Paul Craig	KO (punches)	UFC Fight Night: Nelson vs. Ponzinibbio	July 16, 2017	1	4:56	Glasgow, Scotland	
Win	5–2	Daniel Jolly	KO (knee)	UFC Fight Night: Bermudez vs. The Korean Zombie	February 4, 2017	1	0:52	Houston, Texas, United States	
Loss	4–2	Tyson Pedro	Submission (rear-naked choke)	UFC Fight Night: Whittaker vs. Brunson	November 27, 2016	1	4:07	Melbourne, Australia	
Loss	4–1	Andrew Sanchez	Decision (unanimous)	The Ultimate Fighter: Team Joanna vs. Team Cláudia Finale	July 8, 2016	3	5:00	Las Vegas, Nevada, United States	Return to Light Heavyweight. The Ultimate Fighter 23 Light Heavyweight Tournament Final.
Win	4–0	Justin Polendey	KO (punch)	RFA 33	December 11, 2015	1	1:42	Costa Mesa, California, United States	
Win	3–0	Cameron Olson	Decision (unanimous)	RFA 25	April 10, 2015	3	5:00	Sioux Falls, South Dakota, United States	Middleweight debut.
Win	2–0	Blake Troop	KO (punch)	RFA 21	December 5, 2014	1	0:39	Costa Mesa, California, United States	Catchweight (190 lb) bout.
Win	1–0	Livingston Lukow	Decision (unanimous)	RFA 15	June 6, 2014	3	5:00	Culver City, California, United States	Light Heavyweight debut.

Exhibition record breakdown		
3 matches	2 wins	1 loss
By knockout	2	0
By submission	0	1

Res.	Record	Opponent	Method	Event	Date	Round	Time	Location	Notes
Win	2–1	Josh Stansbury	TKO (punches)	The Ultimate Fighter: Team Joanna vs. Team Cláudia	July 6, 2016 (airdate)	1	4:15	Las Vegas, Nevada, United States	The Ultimate Fighter 23 Semifinal round. Rountree was brought back into competition after an injury to another contestant.
Loss	1–1	Cory Hendricks	Submission (rear-naked choke)	The Ultimate Fighter: Team Joanna vs. Team Cláudia	April 27, 2016 (airdate)	1	2:34	Las Vegas, Nevada, United States	The Ultimate Fighter 23 Quarterfinal round.
Win	1–0	Muhammed Dereese	TKO (punches and soccer kicks to the body)	The Ultimate Fighter: Team Joanna vs. Team Cláudia	April 20, 2016 (airdate)	2	0:38	Las Vegas, Nevada, United States	The Ultimate Fighter 23 Elimination round

Amateur record breakdown		
6 matches	6 wins	0 losses
By knockout	4	0
By submission	1	0
By decision	1	0

Res.	Record	Opponent	Method	Event	Date	Round	Time	Location	Notes
Win	6–0	Dylan Jahrling	KO (punch)	Tuff-N-Uff: Future Stars of MMA 20	July 5, 2013	1	1:47	Las Vegas, Nevada, United States	Won the Tuff-N-Uff Amateur Middleweight Championship.
Win	5–0	Lee Cordova	Submission (guillotine choke)	Tuff-N-Uff: Festibrawl 6	May 26, 2013	1	0:49	Las Vegas, Nevada, United States	
Win	4–0	Prentice Williams	Decision (unanimous)	Tuff-N-Uff: Knock Out Cancer 2	October 11, 2012	3	3:00	Las Vegas, Nevada, United States	
Win	3–0	Giovani Zavala	TKO (knee and punches)	Tuff-N-Uff: Beauties and Beasts	January 27, 2012	1	0:30	Las Vegas, Nevada, United States	
Win	2–0	Niels Berlemann	KO (punch)	KOTC: Future Legends 2	June 4, 2011	1	0:16	Las Vegas, Nevada, United States	
Win	1–0	Travis Jelmyer	TKO (punches)	Tuff-N-Uff: Future Stars of MMA 15	March 12, 2011	1	0:21	Las Vegas, Nevada, United States	

== Pay-per-view bouts ==
No.	Event	Fight	Date	Venue	City	PPV buys
1.	UFC 307	Pereira vs. Rountree Jr.	October 5, 2024	Delta Center	Salt Lake City, Utah, United States	Not Disclosed

== Personal life ==
On January 1, 2024, Mia Kang and Rountree married in an intimate ceremony in Thailand.

== See also ==
- List of current UFC fighters
- List of male mixed martial artists
