= UFC Fight Night: Hall vs. Silva =

UFC mixed martial arts event in 2020

- The poster for UFC Fight Night: Hall vs. Silva
- Promotion: Ultimate Fighting Championship
- Date: October 31, 2020
- Venue: UFC Apex
- City: Enterprise, Nevada, United States
- Attendance: None (behind closed doors)

Event chronology
UFC 254: Khabib vs. Gaethje	UFC Fight Night: Hall vs. Silva	UFC on ESPN: Santos vs. Teixeira

UFC Fight Night: Hall vs. Silva (also known as UFC Fight Night 181, UFC on ESPN+ 39 and UFC Vegas 12) was a mixed martial arts event produced by the Ultimate Fighting Championship that took place on October 31, 2020 at the UFC Apex facility in Enterprise, Nevada, part of the Las Vegas Metropolitan Area, United States.

== Background ==
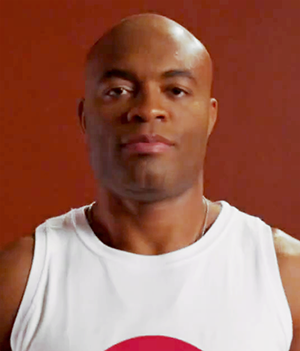
UFC president Dana White announced that this would be Anderson Silva's final fight in the UFC. He is considered one of the greatest of all time and holds the record for 2nd most consecutive wins in the organization (16) and longest title reign in UFC history (2,457 days).

A middleweight bout between former UFC Middleweight Champion Anderson Silva and Uriah Hall served as the headliner. The pairing was initially scheduled to meet at UFC 198 in May 2016. However, Silva pulled out due to acute cholecystitis, which required a cholecystectomy.

Raulian Paiva was expected to face Amir Albazi in a flyweight bout at the event. However, Paiva pulled out of the fight on September 11 citing a knee injury. He was replaced by Zhalgas Zhumagulov and their contest was expected to take place at UFC on ESPN: Smith vs. Clark.

A middleweight bout between Wellington Turman and Sean Strickland was expected to take place at the event. However, Turman pulled out on September 29 due to COVID-19 sequelae that prevented him from training after his two-week quarantine period for the disease ended on September 24. He was replaced by Jack Marshman.

A middleweight bout between Krzysztof Jotko and Makhmud Muradov was briefly scheduled to take place at UFC Fight Night: Ortega vs. The Korean Zombie two weeks earlier, before being moved to this event. However, Jotko pulled out of the bout due to a broken toe and he was replaced by Kevin Holland. In turn, the bout then suffered another setback during fight week as Muradov tested positive for COVID-19 and had to pull out. Holland faced promotional newcomer Charlie Ontiveros.

Aaron Phillips was expected to face Adrian Yañez in a bantamweight bout at the event, but Phillips pulled out on October 20 due to an undisclosed injury. Yañez faced promotional newcomer Victor Rodriguez.

A day before the event, a women's flyweight bout between Priscila Cachoeira and Cortney Casey was scrapped due to Cachoeira having weight cut issues.

At the weigh-ins, Jack Marshman and Cole Williams missed weight for their respective bouts. Marshman weighed in at 187.5 pounds, one and a half pounds over the middleweight non-title fight limit. Williams weighed in at 175.5 pounds, four and a half pounds over the welterweight non-title fight limit. Both of their bouts proceeded at catchweight and they were each fined a percentage of their individual purses, which went to their opponents Sean Strickland and Jason Witt.

== Results ==
Main card (ESPN+)
Weight class				Method	Round	Time	Notes
Middleweight	Uriah Hall	def.	Anderson Silva	TKO (punches)	4	1:24
Featherweight	Bryce Mitchell	def.	Andre Fili	Decision (unanimous) (29–28, 30–27, 30–27)	3	5:00
Heavyweight	Greg Hardy	def.	Maurice Greene	TKO (punches)	2	1:12
Middleweight	Kevin Holland	def.	Charlie Ontiveros	TKO (submission to slam)	1	2:39
Lightweight	Thiago Moisés	def.	Bobby Green	Decision (unanimous) (29–28, 29–28, 29–28)	3	5:00
Preliminary card (ESPN+)
Lightweight	Alexander Hernandez	def.	Chris Gruetzemacher	KO (punches)	1	1:46
Bantamweight	Adrian Yañez	def.	Victor Rodriguez	KO (head kick)	1	2:46
Catchweight (187.5 lb)	Sean Strickland	def.	Jack Marshman	Decision (unanimous) (30–27, 30–27, 30–27)	3	5:00
Catchweight (175.5 lb)	Jason Witt	def.	Cole Williams	Submission (arm-triangle choke)	2	2:09
Light Heavyweight	Dustin Jacoby	def.	Justin Ledet	TKO (leg kicks and punches)	1	2:38
Bantamweight	Miles Johns	def.	Kevin Natividad	KO (punch)	3	2:51

== Bonus awards ==
The following fighters received $50,000 bonuses.

- Fight of the Night: No bonus awarded.
- Performance of the Night: Kevin Holland, Alexander Hernandez, Adrian Yañez, and Miles Johns

== Aftermath ==
On February 9, 2021, it was announced that the Nevada State Athletic Commission (NSAC) issued a six-month suspension and $2,245.36 ($1,800 + $445.36 in legal fees) fine for Charlie Ontiveros due to a failed drug test related to this event. His results showed the presence of DHCMT M3 metabolites.

== See also ==
- List of UFC events
- List of current UFC fighters
- 2020 in UFC
