= Oluwale Bamgbose =

Nigerian mixed martial arts fighter

- Born: August 4, 1987 (age 39); Lagos, Nigeria
- Other names: The Holy War Angel
- Nationality: Nigerian; American
- Height: 5 ft 11 in (1.80 m)
- Weight: 185 lb (84 kg; 13.2 st)
- Division: Middleweight
- Reach: 78 in (200 cm)
- Style: Muay Thai, Kung Fu, Taekwondo, Shotokan Karate, BJJ
- Stance: Southpaw
- Fighting out of: The Bronx, New York, United States
- Team: ClassOneMMA; AzeredoChuteBoxe; Boxers Of Wushu; HolyWarAngelMMA
- Rank: Black prajied in Muay Thai under Luiz Azeredo; Black belt in Taekwondo under Joel Montero; Black sash in Kung Fu; Black belt in Brazilian Jiu-Jitsu under Jose Luis Castro Cademartori; Green belt in Shotokan Karate
- Years active: 2013–present

Mixed martial arts record
- Total: 10
- Wins: 6
- By knockout: 6
- Losses: 4
- By knockout: 3
- By decision: 1

Other information
- University: SUNY Morrisville, SUNY Oneonta, Alfred University
- Children: Olugo Bamgbose (Son)
- Mixed martial arts record from Sherdog

Oluwale Bamgbose (born August 4, 1987) is a Nigerian-American mixed martial artist who most recently competed in the Middleweight division of the Ultimate Fighting Championship. He notably holds black belts in 4 different disciplines.

== Education ==
Oluwale was raised by traditional parents who were very strict. While growing up, Oluwale's parents instilled and encouraged high standards in education and values in Christianity. Oluwale credits God and his parents for his assertive understanding of what it takes to succeed in life. Bamgbose began training in karate at the age of 12 before later transitioning to Taekwondo.

Oluwale currently holds an associate degree in Liberal Arts from SUNY Morrisville, a bachelor's degree in "Child and Family Studies" from SUNY Oneonta and a master's degree in "Public Administration" from Alfred University. It was during his time in college that Bamgbose began training in mixed martial arts.

== Mixed martial arts career ==
After competing as an amateur for one year and compiling a record of 2–1, Bamgbose made his professional debut in June 2013. While competing exclusively for the regional promotion Ring of Combat, he amassed a record of 5–0, finishing all of his opponents in the first round before signing with the Ultimate Fighting Championship in the summer of 2015.

=== Ultimate Fighting Championship ===
Bamgbose made his promotional debut as a short notice replacement against Uriah Hall on August 8, 2015, at UFC Fight Night 73. Bamgbose lost the fight by TKO in the first round.

Bamgbose next faced Daniel Sarafian on February 21, 2016, at UFC Fight Night 83, again as a short notice replacement, filling in for an injured Sam Alvey. Bamgbose won the fight via knockout in the first round.

For a third straight fight, Bamgbose was tabbed as an injury replacement and faced Cezar Ferreira on April 16, 2016, at UFC on Fox 19, filling in for an injured Caio Magalhães. He lost the fight via unanimous decision.

Bamgbose was briefly linked to a bout with Josh Samman on December 9, 2016, at UFC Fight Night 102. However the pairing never materialized as Samman died on October 5, 2016. He was replaced by Joe Gigliotti. In turn, Bamgbose pulled out of the fight in mid-November citing an injury and was replaced by promotional newcomer Gerald Meerschaert.

Bamgbose was expected to face Tom Breese on March 18, 2017, at UFC Fight Night 107. However, the day of the event Breese was deemed unfit to compete and the bout was cancelled.

Bamgbose faced Paulo Costa on June 3, 2017, at UFC 212. He lost the back-and-forth fight via TKO in the second round.

Bamgbose faced Alessio Di Chirico on December 16, 2017, at UFC on Fox 26. He lost the fight via knockout in the second round.

Bamgbose was released from the UFC on December 28, 2017.

== Bare-knuckle boxing ==
Bamgbose made his Bare Knuckle Fighting Championship debut against Karl Roberson on October 4, 2025 at BKFC 82. He won the fight by technical knockout in the second round. This fight earned him a Performance of the Night award.

== Accomplishments ==
=== Mixed martial arts ===
- Ring of Combat
  - Middleweight Champion (One defense)

=== Bare-knuckle boxing ===
- Bare Knuckle Fighting Championship
  - Performance of the Night (One time) vs. Karl Roberson

== Mixed martial arts record ==
Professional record breakdown
10 matches	6 wins	4 losses
By knockout	6	3
By decision	0	1

Res.	Record	Opponent	Method	Event	Date	Round	Time	Location	Notes
Loss	6–4	Alessio Di Chirico	KO (knee)	UFC on Fox: Lawler vs. dos Anjos	December 16, 2017	2	2:14	Winnipeg, Manitoba, Canada	
Loss	6–3	Paulo Costa	TKO (punches)	UFC 212	June 3, 2017	2	1:06	Rio de Janeiro, Brazil	
Loss	6–2	Cezar Ferreira	Decision (unanimous)	UFC on Fox: Teixeira vs. Evans	April 16, 2016	3	5:00	Tampa, Florida, United States	
Win	6–1	Daniel Sarafian	KO (head kick and punches)	UFC Fight Night: Cowboy vs. Cowboy	February 21, 2016	1	1:00	Pittsburgh, Pennsylvania, United States	
Loss	5–1	Uriah Hall	TKO (punches)	UFC Fight Night: Teixeira vs. Saint Preux	August 8, 2015	1	2:32	Nashville, Tennessee, United States	
Win	5–0	Brian Booth	TKO (punches)	Ring of Combat 51	June 5, 2015	1	0:24	Atlantic City, New Jersey, United States	Defended the Ring of Combat Middleweight Championship.
Win	4–0	Devon Morris	TKO (head kick and punches)	Ring of Combat 50	January 23, 2015	1	3:18	Atlantic City, New Jersey, United States	Won the vacant Ring of Combat Middleweight Championship.
Win	3–0	Steve Nichols	TKO (doctor stoppage)	Ring of Combat 49	September 19, 2014	1	1:24	Atlantic City, New Jersey, United States	
Win	2–0	Michael Elshamy	TKO (punches)	Ring of Combat 47	January 24, 2014	1	2:51	Atlantic City, New Jersey, United States	
Win	1–0	Fikret Darzanoff	TKO (punches)	Ring of Combat 45	June 14, 2013	1	2:45	Atlantic City, New Jersey, United States	

== Bare knuckle boxing record ==
Professional record breakdown
1 match	1 win	0 losses
By knockout	1	0

Res.	Record	Opponent	Method	Event	Date	Round	Time	Location	Notes
Win	1–0	Karl Roberson	TKO	BKFC 82	October 4, 2025	2	0:58	Newark, New Jersey, United States	

== See also ==
- List of male mixed martial artists
