= Wellington Turman =

Brazilian mixed martial arts fighter

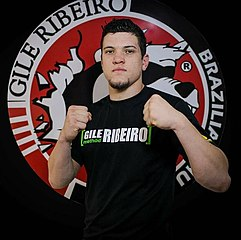
- Wellington Turman in 2020
- Born: July 22, 1996 (age 30); Curitiba, Brazil
- Nickname: The Prodigy
- Height: 6 ft 0 in (183 cm)
- Weight: 170 lb (77 kg; 12 st 2 lb)
- Division: Middleweight (2017–present); Welterweight (2014–2017)
- Reach: 72 in (183 cm)
- Style: Brazilian Jiu-Jitsu
- Fighting out of: Danbury, Connecticut, United States
- Team: Gile Ribeiro Team (until 2021); Teixeira MMA (2021–present)
- Rank: Black belt in Brazilian Jiu-Jitsu
- Years active: 2014–present

Mixed martial arts record
- Total: 27
- Wins: 18
- By knockout: 4
- By submission: 8
- By decision: 6
- Losses: 9
- By knockout: 2
- By submission: 1
- By decision: 6

Other information
- Website: wellingtonturman.com
- Mixed martial arts record from Sherdog

Wellington Turman (born July 22, 1996) is a Brazilian professional mixed martial artist who competed in the middleweight division of the Ultimate Fighting Championship (UFC).

== Background ==
Turman was born and grew up in Curitiba, Brazil. He initially started training Muay Thai to lose weight, but seeing names like Anderson Silva and Jon Jones at UFC that Wellington found, he needed to migrate to MMA.

== Mixed martial arts career ==
=== Early career ===
His premiere in the amateur category took place at 17 years of age. With five wins in five fights on the amateur circuit, Turman turned 18 and decided to start his professional career.

=== Ultimate Fighting Championship ===
Turman made his UFC debut as a late replacement for John Phillips against Karl Roberson on July 13, 2019, at UFC Fight Night 155. Turman lost the fight via a controversial split decision.

Turman faced Markus Perez on November 16, 2019, at UFC Fight Night 164. He won the fight via unanimous decision.

Turman faced Andrew Sanchez on August 8, 2020, at UFC Fight Night 174. He lost the fight via knockout in round one. After the bout, Turman signed a new four-fight contract with the UFC.

Turman was scheduled to face Sean Strickland on October 31, 2020, at UFC Fight Night 181. However, on September 29, Turman pulled out due to COVID-19 sequelae that rendered him unable to train after his two-week quarantine ended on September 24, 2020.

Turman was scheduled to face Aliaskhab Khizriev on February 6, 2021 at UFC Fight Night 184. However, Turman was forced to withdraw from the bout, diagnosing with pneumonia.

Turman faced UFC newcomer Bruno Silva on June 19, 2021 at UFC on ESPN 25. Turman managed to secure multiple takedowns and took Silva's back, but ultimately lost the fight via knockout late in round one.

Turman faced Sam Alvey on August 28, 2021, at UFC on ESPN 30. Turman repeatedly poked Alvey in the eye throughout the fight, being deducted two points, however he won the fight via split decision.

Turman was scheduled to face Rodolfo Vieira on January 22, 2022 at UFC 270. However after Vieira was forced to withdraw for medical reasons, the bout was cancelled.

Replacing Makhmud Muradov, Turman faced Misha Cirkunov on February 26, 2022 at UFC Fight Night 202. He won the bout via armbar in the second round. The win earned Turman his first Performance of the Night bonus award with the company.

Turman was scheduled to face Julian Marquez on June 18, 2022 at UFC Fight Night 208. However, Turman withdrew due to an orbital bone injury and was replaced by Gregory Rodrigues.

Turman faced Andre Petroski on November 12, 2022, at UFC 281. He lost the fight via unanimous decision.

Turman faced Randy Brown on June 24, 2023 at UFC on ABC 5. He lost the bout via unanimous decision.

Turman faced Jared Gooden on December 2, 2023, at UFC on ESPN 52. He lost the fight via rear-naked choke in round two.

After over two years off, Turman was scheduled to face Islam Dulatov on July 25, 2026 at UFC Fight Night 282. However, Dulatov withdrew from the bout just hours before the event due to illness and the matchup was cancelled.

Turman faced Ko Seok-hyeon on November 7, 2026 at UFC Fight Night 293. He lost the fight by unanimous decision.

On November 18, 2026, following his loss to Ko, it was reported that Turman was removed from the UFC roster.

== Championships and accomplishments ==
=== Mixed martial arts ===
- Ultimate Fighting Championship
  - Performance of the Night (One time) vs. Misha Cirkunov

== Mixed martial arts record ==
Professional record breakdown
27 matches	18 wins	9 losses
By knockout	4	2
By submission	8	1
By decision	6	6

Res.	Record	Opponent	Method	Event	Date	Round	Time	Location	Notes
Loss	18–9	Ko Seok-hyeon	Decision (unanimous)	UFC Fight Night: Cortes-Acosta vs. Walker	November 7, 2026	3	5:00	Las Vegas, Nevada, United States	
Loss	18–8	Jared Gooden	Submission (rear-naked choke)	UFC on ESPN: Dariush vs. Tsarukyan	December 2, 2023	2	1:11	Austin, Texas, United States	
Loss	18–7	Randy Brown	Decision (unanimous)	UFC on ABC: Emmett vs. Topuria	June 24, 2023	3	5:00	Jacksonville, Florida, United States	Return to Welterweight.
Loss	18–6	Andre Petroski	Decision (unanimous)	UFC 281	November 12, 2022	3	5:00	New York City, New York, United States	
Win	18–5	Misha Cirkunov	Submission (armbar)	UFC Fight Night: Makhachev vs. Green	February 26, 2022	2	1:29	Las Vegas, Nevada, United States	Performance of the Night
Win	17–5	Sam Alvey	Decision (split)	UFC on ESPN: Barboza vs. Chikadze	August 28, 2021	3	5:00	Las Vegas, Nevada, United States	Turman was twice deducted one point in round 3 due to repeated eye pokes.
Loss	16–5	Bruno Silva	KO (punches)	UFC on ESPN: The Korean Zombie vs. Ige	June 19, 2021	1	4:45	Las Vegas, Nevada, United States	
Loss	16–4	Andrew Sanchez	KO (punch)	UFC Fight Night: Lewis vs. Oleinik	August 8, 2020	1	4:14	Las Vegas, Nevada, United States	
Win	16–3	Markus Perez	Decision (unanimous)	UFC Fight Night: Błachowicz vs. Jacaré	November 16, 2019	3	5:00	São Paulo, Brazil	
Loss	15–3	Karl Roberson	Decision (split)	UFC Fight Night: de Randamie vs. Ladd	July 13, 2019	3	5:00	Sacramento, California, United States	
Win	15–2	Marcio Alexandre Jr.	Submission (rear-naked choke)	Future FC 4	April 19, 2019	1	3:10	São Paulo, Brazil	
Win	14–2	Rafael Atilio	Decision (unanimous)	Imortal FC 10	December 2, 2018	3	5:00	Curitiba, Brazil	
Win	13–2	Rodrigo Jesus	Decision (unanimous)	Imortal FC 7	November 11, 2017	3	5:00	São José dos Pinhais, Brazil	Middleweight debut.
Win	12–2	Sergio de Fatima	Submission (guillotine choke)	Brave CF 8	August 12, 2017	1	1:27	Curitiba, Brazil	
Loss	11–2	Carlston Harris	Decision (unanimous)	Imortal FC 6	December 10, 2016	3	5:00	Curitiba, Brazil	
Win	11–1	Dyego Roberto	Decision (unanimous)	Imortal FC 5	July 23, 2016	3	5:00	São José dos Pinhais, Brazil	
Win	10–1	Caio Rodrigues	Submission (rear-naked choke)	Imortal FC 4	May 21, 2016	1	2:09	São José dos Pinhais, Brazil	
Win	9–1	Cleiton Butiski	TKO (punches)	University of Champions 7	January 30, 2016	1	0:26	Curitiba, Brazil	
Loss	8–1	Gian Siqueira	Decision (unanimous)	XFC International 12	November 28, 2015	3	5:00	São Paulo, Brazil	
Win	8–0	Josimar Lara	Submission (rear-naked choke)	Gladiator Combat Fight 14	July 4, 2015	1	1:37	Curitiba, Brazil	
Win	7–0	Ewerton Ferreira	Decision (unanimous)	Max Fight 14	March 28, 2015	3	5:00	Campinas, Brazil	
Win	6–0	Diego Siqueira	TKO (knee and punches)	Curitiba Fight Pro 3	March 7, 2015	1	1:56	Curitiba, Brazil	
Win	5–0	Leandro Vasconcelos	Submission (guillotine choke)	Power Fight Extreme 12	December 13, 2014	1	4:30	Curitiba, Brazil	
Win	4–0	Edivaldo Siqueira	KO (punches)	Arena Force 4	October 11, 2014	2	3:00	Jaraguá do Sul, Brazil	
Win	3–0	Thiago Nata	TKO (punches)	The Hill Fighters 4	September 28, 2014	2	4:55	São José dos Pinhais, Brazil	
Win	2–0	Wellington Machado	Submission (guillotine choke)	Striker's House Cup 41	September 13, 2014	1	3:05	Curitiba, Brazil	
Win	1–0	Diego Pedroso	Submission (rear-naked choke)	Curitiba Fight Pro 2	August 9, 2014	2	1:15	Curitiba, Brazil	Welterweight debut.

== See also ==
- List of male mixed martial artists
