= Trevor Smith (fighter) =

American mixed martial artist (born 1981)

- Born: January 5, 1981 (age 45); Vancouver, Washington, U.S.
- Other names: Hot Sauce
- Height: 6 ft 3 in (1.91 m)
- Weight: 185 lb (84 kg; 13.2 st)
- Division: Heavyweight; Light Heavyweight; Middleweight
- Reach: 75 in (191 cm)
- Fighting out of: Tukwila, Washington, U.S.
- Team: Ring Demon Jiu-Jitsu; Arizona Combat Sports
- Wrestling: NCAA Division I Wrestling
- Years active: 2009–2019

Mixed martial arts record
- Total: 25
- Wins: 15
- By knockout: 1
- By submission: 9
- By decision: 5
- Losses: 10
- By knockout: 5
- By submission: 1
- By decision: 4

Other information
- University: Iowa State University
- Notable school: Mark Morris High School
- Mixed martial arts record from Sherdog

Trevor Smith (born January 5, 1981) is an American former professional mixed martial artist who competed in the Middleweight division. A professional competitor from 2009 to 2019, Smith formerly competed for Strikeforce and Ultimate Fighting Championship.

== Background ==
Smith was born in Vancouver, Washington and lived there for part of his upbringing. Smith was a state champion in wrestling at Mark Morris High School in Longview, Washington and a NJCAA All-American out of Highline Community College in 2002. He then continued his career at the noted Division I wrestling program at Iowa State University, where he earned a bachelor's degree in marketing.

== Mixed martial arts career ==
=== Early career ===
Smith started his career in 2009. He fought mainly for organizations within his home state. With a MMA record of 7–1, losing only once to Devin Cole, he signed with Strikeforce.

=== Strikeforce ===
Smith made his debut on June 24, 2011, at Strikeforce Challengers: Fodor vs. Terry against Keith Berry. He won via technical submission in the second round.

Smith faced T. J. Cook on November 18, 2011, at Strikeforce Challengers: Britt vs. Sayers. He won via submission in the first round.

Smith faced Gian Villante on January 7, 2012, at Strikeforce: Rockhold vs. Jardine. He lost via TKO in the first round.

Smith was expected to face Tim Kennedy on November 3, 2012, at Strikeforce: Cormier vs. Mir. However, the event was cancelled due to injuries to headliner Frank Mir, as well to co-headliner and middleweight champion Luke Rockhold. This bout eventually took place on January 12, 2013, at Strikeforce: Marquardt vs. Saffiedine. Smith lost via submission in the third round.

=== Ultimate Fighting Championship ===
In his UFC debut, Smith faced Ed Herman on July 27, 2013, at UFC on Fox 8. He lost the fight via split decision. Despite the loss on the scorecards, Smith earned his first Fight of the Night bonus award for his performance.

Smith fought Brian Houston on January 15, 2014, at UFC Fight Night 35. He won the fight by split decision.

Smith faced Thales Leites on April 11, 2014, at UFC Fight Night 39. He lost the fight via TKO in the first round.

Smith faced Tor Troéng on July 16, 2014, at UFC Fight Night 46. He won the fight by unanimous decision.

Smith faced Caio Magalhães on November 8, 2014, at UFC Fight Night 56. Smith lost the fight quickly by knockout in the first round. The stoppage was not without a bit of controversy. Magalhães stunned Smith with a knee and forced a referee stoppage after landing a barrage of follow up punches. It appeared that during the final flurry, several hammerfists landed on the back of Smith's head as he lay unconscious on the canvas. Following the match, Magalhães stated "I didn't notice that," in reference to the strike to the back of Smith's head. "His coach talked to me after the fight, said I punched the back of his head, but I didn't notice it. The referee should have stepped in if he saw something, but he was already out from the punch and knee I landed."

Smith faced Dan Miller on July 12, 2015, at The Ultimate Fighter 21 Finale. He won the fight via lop-sided unanimous decision.

Smith was expected to face promotional newcomer Leonardo Augusto Guimarães on February 21, 2016, at UFC Fight Night 83. However, Smith pulled out of the fight in early February citing a hand injury and was replaced by Anthony Smith.

Smith next faced promotional newcomer Joe Gigilotti on August 6, 2016, at UFC Fight Night 92. He won the one-sided fight via unanimous decision.

Smith faced Andrew Sanchez on December 9, 2016, at UFC Fight Night 102. He lost the fight by unanimous decision.

Smith faced Chris Camozzi on May 28, 2017, at UFC Fight Night 109. He won the fight by unanimous decision.

Smith was scheduled to face promotional newcomer Ramazan Emeev on October 21, 2017, at UFC Fight Night 118. However, Smith pulled out of the fight in early October citing injury and was replaced by Sam Alvey.

Smith faced Elias Theodorou on May 27, 2018, at UFC Fight Night 130. He lost the fight via unanimous decision.

Smith faced Zak Cummings on December 15, 2018, at UFC on Fox 31. He lost the fight by unanimous decision.

Smith was expected to face Antônio Rogério Nogueira in a light heavyweight bout on November 16, 2019, at UFC on ESPN+ 22. However, Nogueira was forced to pull out of the event due to injury, resulting in the cancellation of the bout.

Smith was scheduled to face Alonzo Menifield on December 7, 2019, at UFC on ESPN 7. However, on November 10, 2019, it was reported that Menifield pulled out from the event for undisclosed reason, and he was replaced by Makhmud Muradov. He lost the fight via knock out in round three.

In March 2020, Smith was listed as a former fighter on the UFC website.

== Championships and accomplishments ==
=== Amateur wrestling ===
- National Collegiate Athletic Association
  - Big 12 Conference 197 lb: 4th place out of Iowa State University (2004)
- National Junior College Athletic Association
  - NJCAA All-American out of Highline Community College (2002)
  - NJCAA 197 lb: 3rd place out of Highline Community College (2002)
- Washington Interscholastic Athletics Association
  - 189 lb Washington state champion (out of Mark Morris High School) (2000)

=== Mixed martial arts ===
- Ultimate Fighting Championship
  - Fight of the Night (One time)

== Mixed martial arts record ==
Professional record breakdown
27 matches	17 wins	10 losses
By knockout	3	5
By submission	9	1
By decision	5	4

Res.	Record	Opponent	Method	Event	Date	Round	Time	Location	Notes
Loss	15–10	Makhmud Muradov	KO (punch)	UFC on ESPN: Overeem vs. Rozenstruik	December 7, 2019	3	4:09	Washington, D.C., United States	
Loss	15–9	Zak Cummings	Decision (unanimous)	UFC on Fox: Lee vs. Iaquinta 2	December 15, 2018	3	5:00	Milwaukee, Wisconsin, United States	
Loss	15–8	Elias Theodorou	Decision (unanimous)	UFC Fight Night: Thompson vs. Till	May 27, 2018	3	5:00	Liverpool, England	
Win	15–7	Chris Camozzi	Decision (unanimous)	UFC Fight Night: Gustafsson vs. Teixeira	May 28, 2017	3	5:00	Stockholm, Sweden	
Loss	14–7	Andrew Sanchez	Decision (unanimous)	UFC Fight Night: Lewis vs. Abdurakhimov	December 9, 2016	3	5:00	Albany, New York, United States	
Win	14–6	Joe Gigliotti	Decision (unanimous)	UFC Fight Night: Rodríguez vs. Caceres	August 6, 2016	3	5:00	Salt Lake City, Utah, United States	
Win	13–6	Dan Miller	Decision (unanimous)	The Ultimate Fighter: American Top Team vs. Blackzilians Finale	July 12, 2015	3	5:00	Las Vegas, Nevada, United States	
Loss	12–6	Caio Magalhães	KO (knee and punches)	UFC Fight Night: Shogun vs. Saint Preux	November 8, 2014	1	0:31	Uberlândia, Brazil	
Win	12–5	Tor Troéng	Decision (unanimous)	UFC Fight Night: McGregor vs. Brandao	July 19, 2014	3	5:00	Dublin, Ireland	
Loss	11–5	Thales Leites	TKO (punches)	UFC Fight Night: Nogueira vs. Nelson	April 11, 2014	1	0:45	Abu Dhabi, United Arab Emirates	
Win	11–4	Brian Houston	Decision (split)	UFC Fight Night: Rockhold vs. Philippou	January 15, 2014	3	5:00	Duluth, Georgia, United States	
Loss	10–4	Ed Herman	Decision (split)	UFC on Fox: Johnson vs. Moraga	July 27, 2013	3	5:00	Seattle, Washington, United States	Fight of the Night.
Loss	10–3	Tim Kennedy	Submission (guillotine choke)	Strikeforce: Marquardt vs. Saffiedine	January 12, 2013	3	1:36	Oklahoma City, Oklahoma, United States	
Win	10–2	Alexandre Moreno	Submission (guillotine choke)	BXC: The Rise	June 16, 2012	1	4:21	Springfield, Massachusetts, United States	Middleweight debut.
Loss	9–2	Gian Villante	TKO (punches)	Strikeforce: Rockhold vs. Jardine	January 7, 2012	1	1:05	Las Vegas, Nevada, United States	
Win	9–1	T. J. Cook	Submission (guillotine choke)	Strikeforce Challengers: Britt vs. Sayers	November 18, 2011	1	4:28	Las Vegas, Nevada, United States	
Win	8–1	Keith Berry	Technical Submission (north-south choke)	Strikeforce Challengers: Fodor vs. Terry	June 24, 2011	2	3:02	Kent, Washington, United States	
Win	7–1	Jared Torgeson	Submission (guillotine choke)	CS: CageSport 14	April 23, 2011	1	1:18	Tacoma, Washington, United States	
Win	6–1	Wes Swofford	Submission (keylock)	SF 29: All In	January 28, 2011	1	4:15	Grand Ronde, Oregon, United States	
Win	5–1	Pete Werve	Submission (rear-naked choke)	ROTR 13: Redemption	September 25, 2010	1	3:33	Snoqualmie, Washington, United States	Light Heavyweight debut.
Loss	4–1	Devin Cole	TKO (punches)	ROTR: Rumble on the Ridge 12	August 21, 2010	1	0:31	Snoqualmie, Washington, United States	
Win	4–0	Matt Kovacs	Submission (guillotine choke)	LMMA: Lightning at Legends	July 31, 2010	1	2:22	Toppenish, Washington, United States	
Win	3–0	Jesus Rodriguez	Submission (keylock)	LMMA: Lightning at Legends	June 5, 2010	1	N/A	Toppenish, Washington, United States	
Win	2–0	Tim Perales	Submission (guillotine choke)	Alliance Fights: Counterstrike	August 22, 2009	1	4:03	Kent, Washington, United States	
Win	1–0	Brian Martin	KO (punches)	DC: Battle for the Bobcats	January 10, 2009	1	0:37	Aberdeen, Washington, United States	

== See also ==
- List of current UFC fighters
- List of male mixed martial artists
