= UFC Fight Night: Cowboy vs. Cowboy =

UFC mixed martial arts event in 2016

- The poster for UFC Fight Night: Cowboy vs. Cowboy
- Promotion: Ultimate Fighting Championship
- Date: February 21, 2016
- Venue: Consol Energy Center
- City: Pittsburgh, Pennsylvania
- Attendance: 7,330
- Total gate: $572,547

Event chronology
UFC Fight Night: Hendricks vs. Thompson	UFC Fight Night: Cowboy vs. Cowboy	UFC Fight Night: Silva vs. Bisping

UFC Fight Night: Cowboy vs. Cowboy (also known as UFC Fight Night 83) was a mixed martial arts event held on February 21, 2016, at the Consol Energy Center in Pittsburgh, Pennsylvania.

== Background ==
This was the second event that the UFC hosted in Pittsburgh, and first since UFC Live: Kongo vs. Barry in June 2011. It was originally expected to be headlined by a welterweight bout between former UFC Lightweight Championship challenger Donald Cerrone and Tim Means. On February 3, it was announced that Means was informed of a potential USADA anti-doping policy violation stemming from an out-of-competition sample collection. Because there was insufficient time for a full review and proper promotion before the scheduled bout, Means was pulled from the fight by the UFC. The following day, Alex Oliveira was announced as his replacement.

Sam Alvey was expected to face Daniel Sarafian at the event. However, Alvey pulled out of the bout in late December after sustaining a broken jaw and was replaced by Oluwale Bamgbose.

Bryan Barberena was briefly linked to a bout with Jonavin Webb at the event. However, on January 22, Barberena was pulled from that fight in favor of a matchup with Sage Northcutt on January 30 at UFC on Fox: Johnson vs. Bader, replacing an injured Andrew Holbrook. He was replaced by Nathan Coy.

Sarah Moras was expected to face former Invicta FC Bantamweight Champion Lauren Murphy at the event. However, Moras pulled out of the bout on February 12 citing injury. She was replaced by promotional newcomer Kelly Faszholz.

A welterweight bout between Brandon Thatch and Siyar Bahadurzada, originally slated for this event was rescheduled due to Thatch's inability to gain clearance for needed medication for the event. The bout will take place two weeks later at UFC 196.

John Lineker was expected to face Cody Garbrandt at the event. However, on February 15, Lineker pulled out of the fight due to dengue fever. He was replaced by promotional newcomer Augusto Mendes. Mendes missed weight on his first attempt at the weigh ins, coming in at 142 lb. He was given additional time to make the weight limit for the weight class, but made no attempts to cut further. Instead, he was fined 20 percent of his fight purse, which went to Garbrandt and the commission.

Also on the week leading up to the event, Trevor Smith pulled out of his middleweight bout against Leonardo Augusto Guimaraes due to a hand injury. He was replaced by returning veteran Anthony Smith.

== Results ==
Main Card (Fox Sports 1)
Weight class				Method	Round	Time	Notes
Welterweight	Donald Cerrone	def.	Alex Oliveira	Submission (triangle choke)	1	2:33
Middleweight	Derek Brunson	def.	Roan Carneiro	TKO (punches)	1	2:38
Catchweight (142 lb)	Cody Garbrandt	def.	Augusto Mendes	TKO (punches)	1	4:18
Featherweight	Dennis Bermudez	def.	Tatsuya Kawajiri	Decision (unanimous) (29–28, 29–28, 29–28)	3	5:00
Middleweight	Chris Camozzi	def.	Joe Riggs	TKO (knees)	1	0:26
Lightweight	James Krause	def.	Shane Campbell	Decision (unanimous) (29–28, 29–28, 29–28)	3	5:00
Preliminary Card (Fox Sports 1)
Welterweight	Sean Strickland	def.	Alex Garcia	TKO (punches)	3	4:25
Middleweight	Oluwale Bamgbose	def.	Daniel Sarafian	KO (head kick and punches)	1	1:00
Middleweight	Anthony Smith	def.	Leonardo Augusto Guimarães	Decision (unanimous) (29–28, 29–28, 29–28)	3	5:00
Welterweight	Nathan Coy	def.	Jonavin Webb	Decision (unanimous) (29–28, 29–28, 29–28)	3	5:00
Preliminary Card (UFC Fight Pass)
Women's Bantamweight	Ashlee Evans-Smith	def.	Marion Reneau	Decision (split) (30–27, 28–29, 29–28)	3	5:00
Women's Bantamweight	Lauren Murphy	def.	Kelly Faszholz	TKO (elbows and punches)	3	4:55
Heavyweight	Shamil Abdurakhimov	def.	Anthony Hamilton	Decision (unanimous) (30–27, 29–28, 29–28)	3	5:00

== Bonus awards ==
The following fighters were awarded $50,000 bonuses:

- Fight of the Night: Lauren Murphy vs. Kelly Faszholz
- Performance of the Night: Donald Cerrone and Chris Camozzi

== See also ==
- List of UFC events
- 2016 in UFC
