= Karl Roberson =

American kickboxer and mixed martial arts fighter

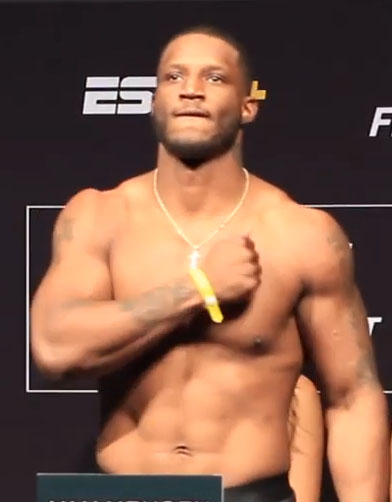
- Roberson in 2019
- Born: October 4, 1990 (age 36); Neptune, New Jersey, U.S.
- Other names: Baby K
- Height: 6 ft 1 in (185 cm)
- Weight: 205 lb (93 kg; 14 st 9 lb)
- Division: Light Heavyweight; Middleweight
- Reach: 74 in (190 cm)
- Fighting out of: Neptune, New Jersey, U.S.
- Team: Killer B Combat Sports Academy (until 2021); Glory MMA & Fitness (2021–present)
- Trainer: Brian Wright
- Years active: 2015–present

Kickboxing record
- Total: 3
- Wins: 0
- Losses: 3
- By knockout: 1

Mixed martial arts record
- Total: 16
- Wins: 9
- By knockout: 2
- By submission: 4
- By decision: 3
- Losses: 7
- By knockout: 2
- By submission: 4
- By decision: 1

Other information
- Mixed martial arts record from Sherdog

Karl Roberson (born October 4, 1990) is an American former kickboxer and mixed martial artist who competed in the Middleweight division of the Ultimate Fighting Championship.

== Early life and education ==
Raised in Neptune Township, New Jersey. Roberson played baseball at Neptune High School.

== Kickboxing career ==
Roberson was called on short notice to fight K-1 legend Jérôme Le Banner at Fight Night Saint-Tropez 4 on August 4 in Saint-Tropez on his retirement fight. Although he was making his professional kickboxing debut, with only three amateur fights, he managed to upset Le Banner and score two knockdowns, first was ruled as a slip and during the second the referee proceeded with a slow count about 30 seconds that allowed him to recover, leading the fight to a controversial decision loss.

== Mixed martial arts career ==
=== Early career ===
After earning three wins in amateur MMA, Roberson made his professional MMA debut May 2015. He fought sporadically over the next two years, obtaining a record of 5–0.

=== Dana White's Tuesday Night Contender Series ===
Roberson appeared in Dana White's Contender Series 3 on July 25, 2017 against Ryan Spann. He won the fight via elbow strikes in round one and he was award the UFC contract.

=== Ultimate Fighting Championship ===
He made his debut on November 11, 2017 against Darren Stewart at UFC Fight Night: Poirier vs. Pettis. He won the fight via rear-naked choke submission in the first round.

Roberson faced Cezar Ferreira on May 12, 2018 at UFC 224. He lost the fight via technical submission in the first round.

Roberson faced Jack Marshman on November 3, 2018 at UFC 230. He won the fight via unanimous decision.

Roberson agreed on a short notice fight against Glover Teixeira in the light heavyweight division at UFC Fight Night: Cejudo vs. Dillashaw on January 19, 2019. Roberson replaced Ion Cutelaba in the fight who had to pull out due to an injury. Despite hurting Teixeira with elbows early in the round, Roberson lost the fight in the first round by submission via arm triangle choke.

Roberson was scheduled to meet John Phillips on July 13, 2019 at UFC Fight Night 155. However, it was reported that Phillips was pulled from the bout due to injury and he was replaced by Wellington Turman. Roberson won the fight via a controversial split decision.

Roberson faced promotional newcomer Roman Kopylov on November 9, 2019 at UFC Fight Night 163. He won the fight via a submission in round three.

Roberson was expected to face Makhmud Muradov on April 18, 2020 at UFC 249. However, Muradov was forced to pull from the event due to COVID-19 pandemic travel restriction, and Roberson was pulled from the event and was scheduled to meet Marvin Vettori on April 25, 2020. However, on April 9, Dana White, the president of UFC announced that this event was postponed to a future date Instead Roberson was scheduled to face Marvin Vettori on May 13, 2020 at UFC on ESPN 9. At the weigh-ins Roberson weighed in at 187.5 pounds, 1.5 pounds over the middleweight non-title weight limit of 186 pounds. He was fined 20% of his purse, which was given to opponent Vettori, and the match was to proceed at a catchweight. However, Roberson was removed from the fight due to rhabdomyolysis. The fight was rescheduled to June 13, 2020 at UFC on ESPN: Eye vs. Calvillo. At the weigh-ins on June 12, Roberson once again missed weight, weighing in at 190.5 pounds, 4.5 pounds over the non-title middleweight limit of 186 pounds. The bout proceed as a catchweight bout and Roberson was fined 30% of his purse. He lost the fight via a submission in round one.

Roberson was scheduled to face Dalcha Lungiambula on December 12, 2020 at UFC 256. However, Karl tested positive for COVID-19 and the fight was moved to the next card on December 19, UFC Fight Night: Thompson vs. Neal.

Roberson faced Brendan Allen on April 24, 2021 at UFC 261. He lost the bout via ankle hook submission at the end of the first round.

Roberson was scheduled to face promotional newcomer Nick Maximov on September 25, 2021 at UFC 266. However, due to medical issues Roberson was forced to withdraw from the event and he was replaced by promotional newcomer Cody Brundage.

Roberson faced Khalil Rountree Jr. on March 12, 2022 at UFC Fight Night 203. Roberson lost the bout via TKO in round two.

Roberson faced Kennedy Nzechukwu on July 9, 2022, at UFC on ESPN 39. He lost the fight via technical knockout in round three.

In July 2022, it was announced that Roberson was no longer on the UFC roster.

=== Post-UFC ===
Roberson was scheduled to face Adriano Capitulino at Gamebred Bareknuckle MMA 7 on March 2, 2024. However, Capitulino was replaced with Handesson Ferreira and Roberson lost the bout by unanimous decision.

== Bare-knuckle boxing ==
Roberson made his Bare Knuckle Fighting Championship debut against Oluwale Bamgbose on October 4, 2025 at BKFC 82. He lost the fight by technical knockout in the second round.

== Legal issues ==
On March 27, 2023, Roberson was arrested in Neptune City, New Jersey on felony charges of burglary, theft, and criminal mischief in connection to a December 2022 residential burglary of a childhood friend's home in Howell Township, where over $200,000 in custom jewelry was stolen. The home's surveillance system showed two masked men, one of whom was determined to be Roberson upon further investigation, on and inside the property. After being placed under arrest and subject to a search of his vehicle following, police located a defaced 9-millimeter handgun in Roberson's vehicle, as well as small packages of crack cocaine and marijuana. He was booked into the Monmouth County correctional institution and was later released after posting bail. If convicted, Roberson faces a maximum of 10 years in prison.

== Mixed martial arts record ==
Professional record breakdown
16 matches	9 wins	7 losses
By knockout	2	2
By submission	4	4
By decision	3	1

Res.	Record	Opponent	Method	Event	Date	Round	Time	Location	Notes
Loss	9–7	Handesson Ferreira	Decision (unanimous)	Gamebred Bareknuckle MMA 7	March 2, 2024	3	5:00	Orlando, Florida, United States	Bare Knuckle MMA.
Loss	9–6	Kennedy Nzechukwu	TKO (elbows)	UFC on ESPN: dos Anjos vs. Fiziev	July 9, 2022	3	2:19	Las Vegas, Nevada, United States	
Loss	9–5	Khalil Rountree Jr.	TKO (body kick and punches)	UFC Fight Night: Santos vs. Ankalaev	March 12, 2022	2	0:25	Las Vegas, Nevada, United States	Return to Light Heavyweight.
Loss	9–4	Brendan Allen	Submission (ankle lock)	UFC 261	April 24, 2021	1	4:55	Jacksonville, Florida, United States	
Loss	9–3	Marvin Vettori	Submission (rear-naked choke)	UFC on ESPN: Eye vs. Calvillo	June 13, 2020	1	4:17	Las Vegas, Nevada, United States	Catchweight (190.5 lb) bout; Roberson missed weight.
Win	9–2	Roman Kopylov	Submission (rear-naked choke)	UFC Fight Night: Magomedsharipov vs. Kattar	November 9, 2019	3	4:01	Moscow, Russia	
Win	8–2	Wellington Turman	Decision (split)	UFC Fight Night: de Randamie vs. Ladd	July 13, 2019	3	5:00	Sacramento, California, United States	
Loss	7–2	Glover Teixeira	Submission (arm-triangle choke)	UFC Fight Night: Cejudo vs. Dillashaw	January 19, 2019	1	3:21	Brooklyn, New York, United States	Light Heavyweight bout.
Win	7–1	Jack Marshman	Decision (unanimous)	UFC 230	November 3, 2018	3	5:00	New York City, New York, United States	
Loss	6–1	Cezar Ferreira	Technical Submission (arm-triangle choke)	UFC 224	May 12, 2018	1	4:45	Rio de Janeiro, Brazil	
Win	6–0	Darren Stewart	Submission (rear-naked choke)	UFC Fight Night: Poirier vs. Pettis	November 11, 2017	1	3:41	Norfolk, Virginia, United States	Return to Middleweight.
Win	5–0	Ryan Spann	KO (elbows)	Dana White's Contender Series 3	July 25, 2017	1	0:15	Las Vegas, Nevada, United States	
Win	4–0	Derrick Brown	Submission (armbar)	CFFC 65: Brady vs. Saraceno	May 20, 2017	1	1:01	Philadelphia, Pennsylvania, United States	Light Heavyweight debut.
Win	3–0	Elijah Gbollie	TKO (punches)	Shogun Fights 16	April 8, 2017	1	1:50	Baltimore, Maryland, United States	
Win	2–0	Michael Wilcox	Submission (armbar)	CFFC 50: Smith vs. Williams	July 18, 2015	1	3:11	Atlantic City, New Jersey, United States	Catchweight (192 lb) bout.
Win	1–0	Chike Obi	Decision (unanimous)	Ring of Combat 51	June 5, 2015	3	5:00	Atlantic City, New Jersey, United States	Middleweight debut.

== Amateur mixed martial arts record ==
Professional record breakdown
3 matches	3 wins	0 losses
By knockout	1	0
By decision	2	0

Res.	Record	Opponent	Method	Event	Date	Round	Time	Location	Notes
Win	3–0	Lex Ludlow	Decision (unanimous)	Xtreme Caged Combat 19: Bloodshed	Nov 15, 2014	3	2:00	Philadelphia, USA	Light Heavyweight bout.
Win	2–0	Lex Ludlow	TKO (retirement)	Xtreme Caged Combat: Vendetta	Jul 26, 2013	1	2:00	Philadelphia, USA	Light Heavyweight bout.
Win	1–0	Adam Timberlake	Decision (unanimous)	GMMMA: Gold Medal MMA	Apr 20, 2013	3	3:00	Metuchen, USA	Heavyweight bout.

== Kickboxing record ==
Professional Kickboxing Record
0 Wins, 3 Losses
Date	Result	Opponent	Event	Location	Method	Round	Time	Record
2016-05-13	Loss	(United States) Mike Lemaire	Glory 30: Los Angeles	Ontario, California, USA	Decision (unanimous)	3	3:00	0–3
2016-02-26	Loss	(United States) Dustin Jacoby	Glory 27: Chicago, Semi Finals	Hoffman Estates, Illinois, USA	TKO	3	2:56	0–2
Drops to middleweight (-85 kg).
2015-08-04	Loss	(France) Jérôme Le Banner	Fight Night Saint-Tropez III	Saint Tropez, France	Decision (unanimous)	5	2:00	0–1
For The W.K.N. World Super Heavyweight (+96.600 kg) Kickboxing OR Championship.

Amateur Kickboxing Record
2 Wins, 1 Losses
Date	Result	Opponent	Event	Location	Method	Round	Time	Record
2014-02-28	Win	(Albania) Simon Camaj	Friday Night Fights	New York City, United States	TKO	4	N/A	2–0
2013-01-30	Win	(United States) Steven Jordan	Friday Night Fights: 2013 Opener	New York City, United States	KO	1	1:39	1–0
Legend: Win Loss Draw/No contest Notes

== Bare knuckle boxing record ==
Professional record breakdown
1 match	0 wins	1 loss
By knockout	0	1

Res.	Record	Opponent	Method	Event	Date	Round	Time	Location	Notes
Loss	0–1	Oluwale Bamgbose	TKO	BKFC 82	October 4, 2025	2	0:58	Newark, New Jersey, United States	
