= Alessio Di Chirico =

Italian mixed martial artist (born 1989)

- Born: December 12, 1989 (age 36); Rome, Italy
- Other names: Manzo
- Height: 6 ft 0 in (1.83 m)
- Weight: 185 lb (84 kg; 13 st 3 lb)
- Division: Light Heavyweight (2011–2014); Middleweight (2015–2022)
- Reach: 74 in (188 cm)
- Stance: Orthodox
- Fighting out of: Rome, Italy
- Team: GLORIA Fight Center (2017–present)
- Trainer: Lorenzo Borgomeo
- Years active: 2011–2022

Mixed martial arts record
- Total: 20
- Wins: 13
- By knockout: 6
- By submission: 4
- By decision: 3
- Losses: 7
- By knockout: 2
- By submission: 1
- By decision: 4

Other information
- University: University of Foro Italico
- Mixed martial arts record from Sherdog

Alessio Di Chirico (born December 12, 1989) is an Italian former mixed martial artist who competed in Middleweight division of the Ultimate Fighting Championship (UFC).

== Background ==
Di Chirico was born in Rome, Italy. He attended University of Foro Italico, majoring in Sport and Science. He started playing American football when he was young and he was the linebacker for Grizzlies Rome from 2008 to 2011. He started MMA training to lose weight and his friend Giovanni Pinelli introduced MMA to him, and decided to transition to MMA from American football after 2011. He joined Roman Gymnasium Hung Mun and started his MMA training there.

== Mixed martial arts career ==
=== International Mixed Martial Arts Federation ===
The International Mixed Martial Arts Federation, partnering with Tuff-N-Uff, organised first-ever Amateur MMA World Championships in Las Vegas in 2014 and Di Chirico won the 2014 International Mixed Martial arts Federation (IMMAF) Light Heavyweight amateur title on July 1. Di Chirico said winning the IMMAF World Championship was the greatest moment of his career saying, "I won the IMMAF world championship in Vegas and raised the flag very high and very proudly for the first time in my life."

=== Early career ===
Di Chirico fought in the European-based promotions and amassed a record of 9–0 prior to joining UFC.

=== Ultimate Fighting Championship ===
Di Chirico made his promotional debut at UFC Fight Night: Rothwell vs. dos Santos on April 10, 2016. He faced Bojan Veličković and he lost the bout by unanimous decision.

On August 27, 2016, Di Chirico faced Garreth McLellan on UFC on Fox: Maia vs. Condit. He won the fight via split decision.

He next faced Eric Spicely on UFC on Fox: Shevchenko vs. Peña on January 28, 2017. He lost the fight via submission (triangle choke) in the first round.

Di Chirico was expected to face Rafael Natal at UFC on Fox: Weidman vs. Gastelum on July 22, 2017. However, Di Chirico pulled out in the weeks leading up to the event due to a neck injury and was replaced by promotional newcomer Eryk Anders.

Di Chirico faced Oluwale Bamgbose on December 16, 2017, at UFC on Fox 26. He won the fight via knockout in the second round. This win earned him the Performance of the Night bonus.

Di Chirico faced Julian Marquez on July 6, 2018, at The Ultimate Fighter 27 Finale. At the weigh-ins, Julian Marquez weighed in at 190 lbs, four pounds over the middleweight limit of 186. He was fined 30% of his fight purse to Di Chirico and the bout proceeded at a catchweight. Di Chirico won the fight via split decision.

Di Chirico was expected to face Jared Cannonier on November 17, 2018, at UFC Fight Night 140. However, it was reported on October 19, 2018, that Cannonier would face David Branch at UFC 230 and Di Chirico was pulled from the card.

Di Chirico was expected to face Tom Breese on March 17, 2019, at UFC Fight Night 147. However Di Chirico pulled out of the fight in early January citing an undisclosed injury and subsequent surgery.

Di Chirico faced Kevin Holland on June 22, 2019, at UFC Fight Night 154. He lost the fight by unanimous decision.

Di Chirico was expected to face Peter Sobotta on September 28, 2019, at UFC Fight Night 160. However, Sobotta was forced out of the bout with an injury and replaced by promotional newcomer Makhmud Muradov. He lost the fight via unanimous decision.

Di Chirico was linked to fight promotional newcomer Antônio Arroyo on November 16, 2019, at UFC Fight Night 164. However, it was announced on October 24, 2019, that Arroyo was scheduled to fight André Muniz instead.

Di Chirico was scheduled to face Abu Azaitar on April 11, 2020, at UFC Fight Night: Overeem vs. Harris. Due to the COVID-19 pandemic, the event was eventually cancelled.

Di Chirico faced Zak Cummings on August 29, 2020, at UFC Fight Night 175. He lost the fight via unanimous decision.

Di Chirico faced Joaquin Buckley on January 16, 2021, at UFC on ABC: Holloway vs. Kattar. He won the fight in the first round via a head kick knockout. This win earned him the Performance of the Night award.

Di Chirico was scheduled to face Roman Dolidze on June 5, 2021, at UFC Fight Night 189. However, Di Chirico pulled out of the contest in mid-May due to an injury. He was replaced by Laureano Staropoli.

Di Chirico was scheduled to face promotional newcomer Aliaskhab Khizriev on August 28, 2021, at UFC on ESPN 30. However, Khizriev was pulled from the event for due to injury and Di Chirico was scheduled to face Abdul Razak Alhassan instead. Di Chirico lost the fight via knockout seventeen seconds into round one.

Di Chirico was scheduled to face Albert Duraev on October 30, 2021, at UFC 267. However, Di Chirico was removed from the pairing on 22 September for undisclosed reasons and replaced by Roman Kopylov.

Di Chirico faced Roman Kopylov on September 3, 2022, at UFC Fight Night 209. He lost the fight via knockout in round three.

After the loss, Di Chirico announced his retirement from MMA.

== Championships and accomplishments ==
- Ultimate Fighting Championship
  - Performance of the Night (Two times) vs. Oluwale Bamgbose and Joaquin Buckley

== Personal life ==
Di Chirico and his wife have two sons.

Di Chirico is founder of his current MMA Team, the GLORIA Fight Center based in Rome.

Di Chirico considers Italian MMA fighters to be knights instead of gladiators for Italians. MMA fighters are gentlemen, committing to fight for a principle and for an idea, according to his philosophy.

Gladiators are slaves. The motto of my team ‘Not Gladiators, we are Knights.’

He also owns a bar in Rome.

In May 2023, news surfaced that Di Chirico was arrested for allegedly striking a taxi driver, resulting in a fractured cheekbone and an injured eye. Afterwards Di Chirico published a statement in which he explained the situation escalated due to a disagreement during the taxi trip, leading to a physical altercation which he also apologized. It is unclear whether formal charges have been filed against Di Chirico.

== Mixed martial arts record ==
Professional record breakdown
20 matches	13 wins	7 losses
By knockout	6	2
By submission	4	1
By decision	3	4

Res.	Record	Opponent	Method	Event	Date	Round	Time	Location	Notes
Loss	13–7	Roman Kopylov	KO (punches)	UFC Fight Night: Gane vs. Tuivasa	September 3, 2022	3	1:09	Paris, France	
Loss	13–6	Abdul Razak Alhassan	KO (head kick)	UFC on ESPN: Barboza vs. Chikadze	August 28, 2021	1	0:17	Las Vegas, Nevada, United States	
Win	13–5	Joaquin Buckley	KO (head kick)	UFC on ABC: Holloway vs. Kattar	January 16, 2021	1	2:12	Abu Dhabi, United Arab Emirates	Performance of the Night.
Loss	12–5	Zak Cummings	Decision (unanimous)	UFC Fight Night: Smith vs. Rakić	August 29, 2020	3	5:00	Las Vegas, Nevada, United States	
Loss	12–4	Makhmud Muradov	Decision (unanimous)	UFC Fight Night: Hermansson vs. Cannonier	September 28, 2019	3	5:00	Copenhagen, Denmark	
Loss	12–3	Kevin Holland	Decision (unanimous)	UFC Fight Night: Moicano vs. The Korean Zombie	June 22, 2019	3	5:00	Greenville, South Carolina, United States	
Win	12–2	Julian Marquez	Decision (split)	The Ultimate Fighter: Undefeated Finale	July 6, 2018	3	5:00	Las Vegas, Nevada, United States	Catchweight (190 lb) bout; Marquez missed weight.
Win	11–2	Oluwale Bamgbose	KO (knee)	UFC on Fox: Lawler vs. dos Anjos	December 16, 2017	2	2:14	Winnipeg, Manitoba, Canada	Performance of the Night.
Loss	10–2	Eric Spicely	Submission (triangle choke)	UFC on Fox: Shevchenko vs. Peña	January 28, 2017	1	2:14	Denver, Colorado, United States	
Win	10–1	Garreth McLellan	Decision (split)	UFC on Fox: Maia vs. Condit	August 27, 2016	3	5:00	Vancouver, British Columbia, Canada	
Loss	9–1	Bojan Veličković	Decision (unanimous)	UFC Fight Night: Rothwell vs. dos Santos	April 10, 2016	3	5:00	Zagreb, Croatia	
Win	9–0	Andrzej Grzebyk	Decision (unanimous)	Fight Exclusive Night 9	November 7, 2015	3	5:00	Wrocław, Poland	
Win	8–0	André Reinders	TKO (punches)	Caveam: Bitva Roku 2015	March 19, 2015	3	5:00	Prague, Czech Republic	
Win	7–0	Adam Kowalski	TKO (punches)	Professional League of MMA 47	January 30, 2015	2	2:40	Warsaw, Poland	Middleweight debut.
Win	6–0	Giovanni Luciani	Submission (rear-naked choke)	Centurion FC	June 21, 2014	2	0:41	Guidonia, Italy	
Win	5–0	Cristian Magro	TKO (punches)	Storm FC 5	October 12, 2013	1	4:15	Rome, Italy	
Win	4–0	Oleg Medvedev	Submission (keylock)	White Rex: Tana Delle Tigri 1	May 31, 2013	1	3:54	Rome, Italy	
Win	3–0	Daniele D'Angelo	TKO (punches)	Storm FC 3	March 23, 2013	1	1:25	Rome, Italy	
Win	2–0	Issa Saidi	Submission (rear-naked choke)	Ronin FC 2	February 24, 2012	1	2:48	Rome, Italy	
Win	1–0	Mohamed Anoir	Submission (rear-naked choke)	Ronin FC 1	December 9, 2011	1	2:55	Rome, Italy	

== See also ==
- List of male mixed martial artists
