= Makhmud Muradov =

Uzbek mixed martial artist (born 1990)

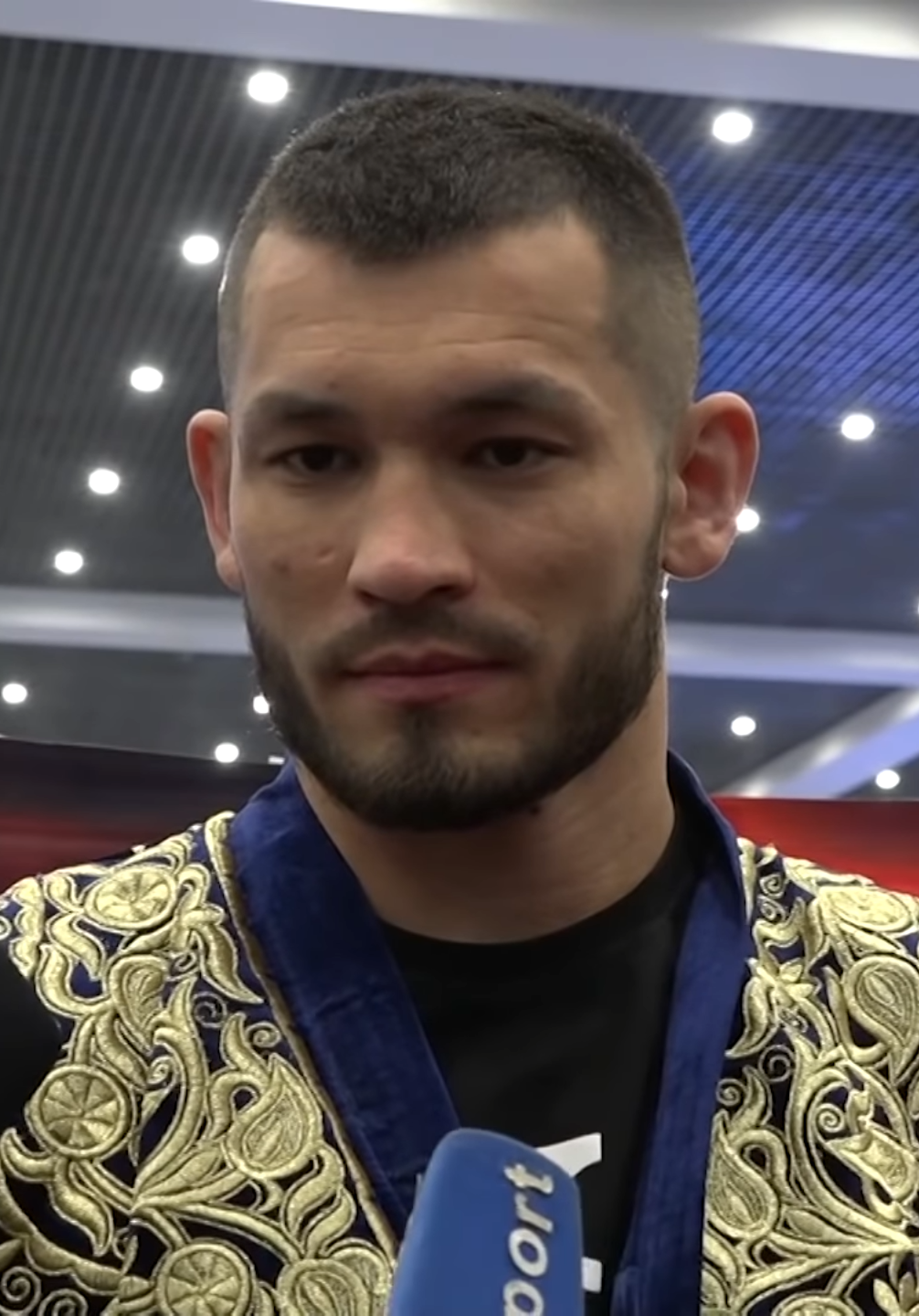
- Muradov in 2021
- Born: February 8, 1990 (age 36); Dushanbe, Tajik SSR, Soviet Union (now Tajikistan)
- Other names: Mach
- Nationality: Uzbek
- Height: 6 ft 2 in (1.88 m)
- Weight: 186 lb (84 kg; 13 st 4 lb)
- Division: Middleweight; Light Heavyweight
- Reach: 75 in (191 cm)
- Fighting out of: Bukhara, Uzbekistan
- Team: The Money Team (Mayweather Boxing Club) (present); Legion Fight Club (Muradov Team) (present); Black Kobra Striking System (present); SK MMA Monster Praha (present); Ankos MMA Poznań (present); London Shootfighters (present); Tiger Muay Thai Phuket (previously)
- Trainer: SK MMA Monster Praha: Petr "Moster" Kníže (co-head coach; MMA coach); Lukáš Bárta (padman; striking coach); Ankos MMA Poznań: Andrzej Kościelski (co-head coach; MMA coach); Marek Drażdżyński (kickboxing coach); Paweł Korowczyk (striking coach); Black Kobra Striking System (The Money Team): Dewey "Black Kobra" Cooper (striking coach); London Shootfighters: Karlos Vemola (sparring partner; submission wrestling coach); Jasur Alijanov (head- and corner coach)
- Years active: 2012–present

Mixed martial arts record
- Total: 39
- Wins: 30
- By knockout: 19
- By submission: 3
- By decision: 8
- Losses: 8
- By knockout: 1
- By submission: 4
- By decision: 3
- No contests: 1

Other information
- Mixed martial arts record from Sherdog

Makhmud Muradov (born February 8, 1990) is an Uzbek professional mixed martial artist. He currently competes in the Light Heavyweight and Middleweight divisions of Oktagon MMA, where he is the current interim Oktagon Middleweight Champion and Oktagon Light Heavyweight Champion. He formerly competed in the Middleweight division of the Ultimate Fighting Championship (UFC).

== Background ==
Makhmud Muradov was born on February 8, 1990, in Soviet Tajikistan, to a father who was a Tajik national and a mother who was from Soviet Uzbekistan. In 1993, he fled as a refugee with his family to his mother's native Uzbekistan due to the ongoing Tajik civil war, and finally, in 2019, he was granted Uzbek citizenship.

He trained boxing in his youth before transitioning to kickboxing and became Junior Uzbek Kickboxing Champion under K-1 rules.

Muradov was forced to drop out of school and start working at the age of 15 to provide for his family after his father got involved in a car accident that left him permanently disabled. At the age of 17, he began his successful combat sambo career, and because of that, he earned a well-paid job as a security guard in Russian Siberia. He was seriously stabbed and shot several times while working there. When his father got released from hospital after four years, his family had to sell their apartment to pay for healthcare bills. Muradov returned to Uzbekistan, and eventually managed to make enough money from competing in combat sambo to be able to buy the apartment back. However, by his account, it was hard to get a good job without contacts, so in 2011, then 21 years old Muradov moved to the Czech Republic in search of a better-paying job. There, he worked various jobs such as construction site worker, cleaner, and waiter. He started training Muay Thai and MMA in Prague under the tutelage of Petr Kníže, who allowed Muradov to train and sleep in his gym for free and also helped him get a more comfortable job as a bouncer. Muradov then started his professional MMA career in 2012.

== Mixed martial arts career ==
=== Early career ===
In September 2015, Muradov fought at WAKO K1 European Cup 2015 tournament and lost in the first match against Polish champion Bartosz Dołbień by unanimous decision.

In February 2018, Muradov became the world's first mixed martial artist signed by Floyd Mayweather Jr.'s The Money Team. They became friends after they met each other at Prague's Lávka Club in March 2017.

Before entering the UFC, Muradov held a 22–6 MMA record and won multiple regional middleweight championships (XFN, WKN, Caveam, WASO).

=== Ultimate Fighting Championship ===
==== 2019 ====
Muradov made his promotional debut against Alessio Di Chirico on September 28, 2019, at UFC Fight Night 160 as a replacement for injured Peter Sobotta. He took the fight on 12 days notice. He won the fight via unanimous decision.

As of September 29, 2019, he was ranked #1 in the Tapology's Eastern European middleweight rankings.

In his second UFC fight, on December 7, 2019, at UFC on ESPN 7, Muradov faced Trevor Smith as a replacement for Alonzo Menifield. He won via KO in the third round and was awarded a Performance of the Night bonus.

In the official UFC 2019 year-end list of the Ten Best Newcomers, Muradov was ranked #7.

==== 2020 ====
Muradov was scheduled to face Antônio Carlos Júnior on March 14, 2020, at UFC Fight Night 170, as a replacement for Brad Tavares who had to pull out due to an anterior cruciate ligament (ACL) injury. In turn, Carlos Júnior suffered from an unspecified injury and the bout was cancelled from the event.

Muradov was expected to face Karl Roberson on April 18, 2020, at UFC 249. However, Muradov was forced to pull from the event due to COVID-19 pandemic travel restriction, and Roberson was pulled from the event and was scheduled to meet Marvin Vettori on April 25, 2020.

On October 18, 2020, at UFC Fight Night 180, Muradov was expected to face Krzysztof Jotko. However, the fight was rescheduled for October 31 at UFC Fight Night 181, but Jotko was pulled from the fight, citing injury, and he was replaced by Kevin Holland. Muradov was then also pulled from the fight after testing positive for COVID-19 and he was replaced by newcomer Charlie Ontiveros.

==== 2021 ====
Muradov faced Andrew Sanchez on January 24, 2021, at UFC 257, as a replacement for André Muniz. He won the fight via technical knockout in round three. This win earned him the Performance of the Night award.

Muradov faced Gerald Meerschaert on August 28, 2021, at UFC on ESPN 30. He lost the fight via rear-naked choke submission in round two.

Muradov was scheduled to face Misha Cirkunov on February 26, 2022, at UFC Fight Night 202. However, Muradov pulled out in late January due to a hand injury and he was replaced by Wellington Turman.

==== 2022 ====
Muradov was scheduled to face Abusupiyan Magomedov on September 3, 2022, at UFC Fight Night 209. However, Muradov withdrew due to injury was replaced by Dustin Stoltzfus.

Muradov faced Caio Borralho on October 22, 2022, at UFC 280. He lost the bout via unanimous decision.

==== 2023 ====
Muradov was expected to face Abusupiyan Magomedov on March 11, 2023, at UFC Fight Night: Yan vs. Dvalishvili. At the end of February, it was announced that Muradov had pulled out of the bout again.

Muradov faced Bryan Barberena on July 22, 2023, at UFC on ESPN+ 82. He won the fight via unanimous decision.

==== 2024 ====
Muradov faced Aliaskhab Khizriev on February 3, 2024, UFC Fight Night 235. After being poked in the eye seconds into round one by Khizriev, the bout was called off and deemed a "no contest" due to an accidental eye poke.

Muradov was scheduled to face Michel Pereira on May 4, 2024, at UFC 301. However, Muradov withdrew due to an infection.

On May 4, 2024, it was announced that Muradov was released from the UFC, despite signing a new deal recently.

=== Return to Oktagon MMA ===
On June 8, 2024, it was announced that Muradov re-signed with Oktagon MMA.

Muradov faced Scott Askham on September 21, 2024, at Oktagon 61. He won the fight via unanimous decision.

Muradov was scheduled to face Joliton Lutterbach on March 8, 2025, at Oktagon 68. However, Lutterbach was forced to withdraw due to injury and was replaced by Yasubey Enomoto. He won the fight via knockout in round two.

Muradov faced Patrik Kincl for the interim Oktagon Middleweight Championship on June 14, 2025, at Oktagon 72. He won the title via unanimous decision.

Replacing Daniel Škvor, who withdrew due to injury, Muradov faced Will Fleury for the Oktagon Light Heavyweight Championship on August 1, 2026, at Oktagon 92. Muradov won the title by TKO in the second round.

== Personal life ==
A professional MMA competitor since 2012, Muradov is both the first Tajik-born and Uzbek UFC fighter, and the world's first mixed martial artist signed by Floyd Mayweather Jr.'s The Money Team.

Besides his native Uzbek, Muradov speaks Czech, Russian and English and is conversational in Polish and Arabic.

Muradov is a non-denominational Muslim and he does not strictly observe the Ramadan fast.

Since 2018, he has been dating Monika Bagárová, a Czech singer. On May 27, 2020, Bagárová gave birth to their first child, a daughter named Rumia. The couple split up in December 2021. However, in February 2022, Bagárová confirmed they had reconciled. They separated again in July 2022. In March 2023 Muradov confirmed relationship with Czech reality TV star Sabina Karásková.

Muradov has stated multiple times that he is very patriotic towards the Czech lands and Prague. He called himself an “Uzbek with a Czech heart” or a “Czech from Uzbekistan”, and also a “Czech representative” and a “proud Praguer”. Because of that, Muradov turned down Floyd Mayweather Jr.'s offer to permanently relocate from Prague to Las Vegas in Nevada, where he is training at both the Dewey "Black Kobra" Cooper's gym and the Mayweather Boxing Club, as well as working for Mayweather Jr. himself.

During his early time in Prague, Muradov appeared in autoerotic porn productions and solo softcore porn photo shoots under the stage name "Akhmed Virt" for William Higgins' gay pornographic production company.

== Championships and accomplishments ==
=== Mixed martial ===
- OKTAGON MMA
  - OKTAGON Light Heavyweight Champion (One time, current)
  - OKTAGON interim Middleweight Champion (One time, current)
- Ultimate Fighting Championship
  - Performance of the Night (Two times) vs. Trevor Smith and Andrew Sanchez
  - UFC.com Awards
    - 2019: Ranked #7 Newcomer of the Year
- X FIGHT NIGHTS
  - XFN Middleweight Championship (One time)
    - One successful title defense
  - Interim XFN Middleweight Championship (One time)
- World Kickboxing Network
  - WKN MMA International Middleweight Championship (One time)
- Caveam
  - Caveam National Middleweight Championship (Champion of Caveam) (One time)
- World Association of Sporting Organizations
  - WASO MMA European Middleweight Championship (One time)

=== Kickboxing ===
- Uzbekistan Kickboxing Federation
  - Junior National K-1 Kickboxing Champion (gold) (One time)
- Fame MMA
  - Winner of the Fame MMA S-Class Tournament

== Mixed martial arts record ==
Professional record breakdown
39 matches	30 wins	8 losses
By knockout	19	1
By submission	3	5
By decision	8	2
No contests	1	

Res.	Record	Opponent	Method	Event	Date	Round	Time	Location	Notes
Win	30–8 (1)	Will Fleury	TKO (punches)	Oktagon 92	August 1, 2026	2	0:19	Prague, Czech Republic	Light Heavyweight debut. Won the Oktagon Light Heavyweight Championship.
Win	29–8 (1)	Patrik Kincl	Decision (unanimous)	Oktagon 72	June 14, 2025	5	5:00	Prague, Czech Republic	Won the interim Oktagon Middleweight Championship.
Win	28–8 (1)	Yasubey Enomoto	KO (knee and punches)	Oktagon 68	March 8, 2025	2	0:40	Stuttgart, Germany	
Win	27–8 (1)	Scott Askham	Decision (unanimous)	Oktagon 61	September 21, 2024	3	5:00	Brno, Czech Republic	
NC	26–8 (1)	Aliaskhab Khizriev	NC (accidental eye poke)	UFC Fight Night: Dolidze vs. Imavov	February 3, 2024	1	0:11	Las Vegas, Nevada, United States	Accidental eye poke rendered Muradov unable to continue.
Win	26–8	Bryan Barberena	Decision (unanimous)	UFC Fight Night: Aspinall vs. Tybura	July 22, 2023	3	5:00	London, England	
Loss	25–8	Caio Borralho	Decision (unanimous)	UFC 280	October 22, 2022	3	5:00	Abu Dhabi, United Arab Emirates	
Loss	25–7	Gerald Meerschaert	Submission (rear-naked choke)	UFC on ESPN: Barboza vs. Chikadze	August 28, 2021	2	1:49	Las Vegas, Nevada, United States	
Win	25–6	Andrew Sanchez	TKO (flying knee and punches)	UFC 257	January 23, 2021	3	2:59	Abu Dhabi, United Arab Emirates	Performance of the Night.
Win	24–6	Trevor Smith	KO (punch)	UFC on ESPN: Overeem vs. Rozenstruik	December 7, 2019	3	4:09	Washington, D.C., United States	Performance of the Night.
Win	23–6	Alessio Di Chirico	Decision (unanimous)	UFC Fight Night: Hermansson vs. Cannonier	September 28, 2019	3	5:00	Copenhagen, Denmark	
Win	22–6	Wendell de Oliveira Marques	KO (punches)	Oktagon 13	July 27, 2019	2	1:56	Prague, Czech Republic	
Win	21–6	Alberto Emiliano Pereira	TKO (punches)	Oktagon 12	June 8, 2019	1	3:34	Bratislava, Slovakia	
Win	20–6	Tato Primera	KO (punch)	Night of Warriors 15	April 6, 2019	2	0:18	Liberec, Czech Republic	Won the NOW Middleweight Championship.
Win	19–6	Diego Gonzalez	Decision (unanimous)	X Fight Nights 17	March 16, 2019	3	5:00	Brno, Czech Republic	
Win	18–6	Grzegorz Siwy	KO (punch)	X Fight Nights 15	December 27, 2018	3	4:50	Prague, Czech Republic	
Win	17–6	Deyan Topalski	TKO (punches)	X Fight Nights 12	October 6, 2018	1	4:27	Prague, Czech Republic	Defended the XFN Middleweight Championship.
Win	16–6	David Ramires	TKO (punches)	X Fight Nights 11	June 28, 2018	2	0:30	Prague, Czech Republic	Won and unified the XFN Middleweight Championship.
Win	15–6	Edvaldo de Oliveira	TKO (elbows)	X Fight Nights 8	March 3, 2018	2	4:42	Pardubice, Czech Republic	
Win	14–6	Tomáš Penz	TKO (punches)	X Fight Nights 6	December 7, 2017	1	4:20	Prague, Czech Republic	Defended the interim XFN Middleweight Championship.
Win	13–6	Zoran Dod	Decision (unanimous)	X Fight Nights 3	June 25, 2017	3	5:00	Prague, Czech Republic	Won the interim XFN Middleweight Championship.
Win	12–6	Shota Gvasalia	TKO (punches)	Simply the Best 14	April 18, 2017	3	2:07	Prague, Czech Republic	
Loss	11–6	David Ramires	TKO (clavicle injury)	X Fight Nights 2	December 18, 2016	2	1:19	Prague, Czech Republic	For the inaugural XFN Middleweight Championship.
Win	11–5	Damian Chandzel	Submission (forearm choke)	Night of Warriors 10	November 5, 2016	1	1:36	Liberec, Czech Republic	
Win	10–5	Rafael Silva	Decision (unanimous)	X Fight Nights 1	June 12, 2016	3	5:00	Prague, Czech Republic	
Win	9–5	Tomáš Kužela	Decision (unanimous)	Night of Warriors 9	March 19, 2016	3	5:00	Prague, Czech Republic	Won the WKN MMA International Middleweight Championship.
Win	8–5	Andreas Birgels	TKO (punches)	Caveam: Bitva Roku 2015	March 19, 2015	3	3:35	Prague, Czech Republic	Won the Caveam National Middleweight Championship.
Loss	7–5	Maciej Różański	Decision (unanimous)	Fighting Zone: Cage Time 1	December 10, 2014	3	5:00	Prague, Czech Republic	
Win	7–4	István Tóth	Submission (rear-naked choke)	Czech Muay Thai Association: Pardál Gladiators Night Cage 3	May 24, 2014	1	2:20	České Budějovice, Czech Republic	
Win	6–4	Krzysztof Klepacz	TKO (punches)	MMAA Aréna 3	March 7, 2014	1	3:48	Hradec Králové, Czech Republic	
Win	5–4	Peter Čapkovič	Submission (guillotine choke)	Fight Explosion: Return of Kings	December 6, 2013	2	2:37	Bratislava, Slovakia	
Loss	4–4	Livio Victoriano	Submission (triangle choke)	MMAA Aréna 2	November 10, 2013	1	3:40	Prague, Czech Republic	
Loss	4–3	Maciej Różański	Submission (guillotine choke)	Arena Berserkerów 3	May 11, 2013	2	0:45	Goleniów, Poland	
Win	4–2	Pavol Langer	TKO (punches)	Czech Muay Thai Association: Trutnovs Night of Gladiators	February 7, 2013	1	3:30	Trutnov, Czech Republic	
Loss	3–2	Marcin Krysztofiak	Decision (split)	Makowski FC 5	December 8, 2012	2	5:00	Nowa Sól, Poland	Catchweight (187 lb) bout.
Win	3–1	Christoph Steinmann	Decision (unanimous)	Cage XFC: International Lake Constance Cup 2	October 20, 2012	1	N/A	Lochau, Austria	
Loss	2–1	Kamil Cibiński	Submission (armbar)	MMAA Aréna 1	September 30, 2012	1	1:57	Prague, Czech Republic	
Win	2–0	Francisco Silva	TKO (punches)	Czech Muay Thai Association: Pardál Gladiators Night Cage 1	May 19, 2012	3	1:05	České Budějovice, Czech Republic	
Win	1–0	Patrik Jevický	TKO (punches)	K1 Empress League: Round 2	April 29, 2012	1	0:26	Košice, Slovakia	Middleweight debut.

== Kickboxing record ==
Professional kickboxing record
4 Wins (0 (T)KOs), 0 Losses, 0 Draw
Date	Result	Opponent	Event	Location	Method	Round	Time
2026-03-21	Win	(Poland) Denis Labryga	Fame 30: Icons	Gliwice, Poland	Decision (unanimous)	3	3:00
Wins the vacant Fame Heavyweight Title.
2026-01-24	Win	(Poland) Izuagbe Ugonoh	Fame 29: S-Class Tournament	Tarnów, Poland	Decision (unanimous)	3	3:00
2026-01-24	Win	(Poland) Tomasz Sarara	Fame 29: S-Class Tournament	Tarnów, Poland	Decision (unanimous)	2	3:00
2026-01-24	Win	(Poland) Marcin Sianos	Fame 29: S-Class Tournament	Tarnów, Poland	Decision (unanimous)	2	3:00
Won Fame MMA S-Class Tournament.

== KMM record ==
Professional record breakdown
2 matches	2 wins	0 losses
By knockout	2	0

Res.	Record	Opponent	Method	Event	Date	Round	Time	Location	Notes
Win	2–0	Nordin Bouhaddaoui	TKO (elbows)	Souboj Titánů 2016	April 15, 2016	3	1:38	Plzeň, Czech Republic	
Win	1–0	Róbert Kertész	TKO (punches)	Souboj Titánů 2015	April 15, 2015	3	N/A	Plzeň, Czech Republic	

1.KMM (Kickboxing–Muaythai–MMA) uses hybrid ruleset: first round is conducted under the WAKO's K-1 Rules, second round under the IFMA's Muaythai Rules and third round under the Unified Rules of MMA.

== See also ==
- List of current Oktagon MMA fighters
- List of male mixed martial artists
