= Ruff =

Ruff may refer to:

== Places ==
- Ruff, Virginia, United States, an unincorporated community
- Ruff, Washington, United States, an unincorporated community

== Fictional characters ==
- Ruff Ruffman, the animated dog host of Fetch! With Ruff Ruffman
- Ruff, a cat on The Ruff & Reddy Show
- Ruff, a dog in Dennis the Menace
- Ruff, a boy in 40 Winks
- Ruff, in the video game Dragon Quest VII
- Ruffs, a playable character in the video game Brawl Stars

== Other uses ==
- Ruff (bird) (Calidris pugnax or Philomachus pugnax), a bird in the wader family
- Ruff (cards), to play a trump card to a trick in cards
- Ruff (clothing), a very wide collar, usually stiff and thick
- Ruff (surname)
- Ranik Ultimate Fighting Federation, a Chinese mixed martial arts organization
- Real Ulster Freedom Fighters, a loyalist paramilitary organisation in Northern Ireland
- Australian herring or ruff, a fish
- USS Ruff, two minesweepers
- Ruff, a percussion rudiment similar to the drag
- Ruff, a 2015 album by Born Ruffians

== See also ==
- Ruff and Honours, a 17th-century card game
- Ruff-Ruff, Tweet and Dave, an American children's CGI animated television series
- Ruffe, fish in the genus Gymnocephalus
- Ruffs (mixtape), by Kenny Mason
