= Rupf =

Rupf is a surname. Notable people with the surname include:

- Daniel Rupf (footballer, born 1967), Swiss footballer
- Daniel Rupf (footballer, born 1986), German footballer
- Eugen Rupf (1914–2000), Swiss footballer
- Konrad Rupf (1929–2013), German bass-baritone and teacher

== See also ==
- Ruff (surname)
