= Zhumabek Tursyn =

Kazakh mixed martial artist

- Born: April 17, 1986 (age 40); Xinjiang, China
- Other names: The Wild Wolf
- Nationality: Chinese (former), Kazakh (current)
- Height: 5 ft 7 in (1.70 m)
- Weight: 135 lb (61 kg; 9.6 st)
- Division: Bantamweight
- Reach: 67 in (170 cm)
- Style: Sanda and Freestyle Wrestling
- Fighting out of: Almaty, Kazakhstan
- Years active: 2009–present

Mixed martial arts record
- Total: 34
- Wins: 23
- By knockout: 8
- By submission: 5
- By decision: 10
- Losses: 10
- By knockout: 2
- By submission: 3
- By decision: 5
- Draws: 1

Other information
- Mixed martial arts record from Sherdog

Zhumabek Tursyn

Chinese name
- Simplified Chinese: 居马别克·吐尔逊
- Traditional Chinese: 居馬別克·吐爾遜
Transcriptions
Standard Mandarin
- Hanyu Pinyin: Jūmǎbiékè Tǔěrxùn

Kazakh name
- Kazakh: جۇمابەك تۇرسىن; Jūmabek Tūrsyn; Жұмабек Тұрсын

Zhumabek Tursyn (Kazakh: Жұмабек Тұрсын) is a Kazakhstani mixed martial arts fighter and trainer. He currently fights as a Bantamweight.

== Early life ==
Zhumabek is an ethnic Kazakh originally from the Chinese autonomous region of Xinjiang.

Zhumabek trains out of China's elite Xian Physical Education University, where he is a pupil of Zhao Xuejun. Zhumabek is a well-rounded fighter who combines pinpoint Sanda striking with freestyle Wrestling. Zhumabek is also associated with Phuket Top Team, Thailand.

== Mixed martial arts career ==
Zhumabek fought on the Chinese regional scene before joining Ranik Ultimate Fighting Federation (RUFF China) in 2011. He had a KO win over Bolin Li at RUFF 1 and a unanimous decision victory over Yanfei Zhao at RUFF 2.

Zhumabek rematched and defeated Honggang Yao via unanimous decision (3 rounds) at Legend Fighting Championship 7 for the bantamweight strap. He then returned to RUFF garnering a shot at the bantamweight strap against Irshaad Sayed, but the fight was cancelled due to UFC interest in Jumabieke.

=== Ultimate Fighting Championship ===
The UFC signing Zhumabek was widely reported in early 2013, however Zhumabek had to wait over a year to debut for the promotion. During the hiatus Jumabieke stated his professional mixed martial arts record was not an accurate, even claiming he fought three times in December 2013.

With an official MMA record of 15–0 Zhumabek was scheduled to fight Mark Eddiva at The Ultimate Fighter: China Finale in a featherweight fight. Eddiva controlled Zhumabek en route to a unanimous decision.

Zhumabek returned to the Octagon at The Ultimate Fighter 19 Finale against Leandro Issa. In a Fight of the Night battle, Issa caught Zhumabek in an armbar in the third round.

Zhumabek was scheduled to meet Patrick Williams but due to injury he instead fought Marcus Brimage on November 8, 2014 at UFC Fight Night: Rockhold vs. Bisping, in Sydney Australia. He was defeated via first-round knockout due to a head kick and follow up punches and was subsequently released from the promotion.

=== Post-UFC career ===
Starting from November 21, 2015, the fighter made a return to the Featherweight division, marking a significant point in his career with a majority draw against Alison Santos Marques at the WBK 8: Return of the King event in Yining, China. After that, he demonstrated impressive form by securing back-to-back unanimous decision victories in the following year, first against Marques in a rematch in March, and later against Giovanni Moljo in June, even clinching the vacant WBK Featherweight Championship.

However, his momentum was broken when he faced a defeat at the hands of Soo Chul Kim in July 2016, losing by TKO in the Road FC 032 event. Despite this setback, he showed resilience by quickly bouncing back with a pair of knockout victories. He first defeated Paata Robakidze with a body kick in December 2016, then Alison Santos Marques, this time with punches, in June 2017.

His journey took another twist when he fell short against Aliyar Sarkerov in July 2017, in a fight for the vacant KLF Featherweight Championship. Undeterred, he came back with a TKO win over Sergey Yakovlev just a month later. However, this victory was short-lived, as he then went through a challenging period, suffering a series of losses against Boris Fedorov, Andre Harrison, Lance Palmer, and Alexandre Almeida from May 2018 to October 2018.

After a year-long hiatus, he returned to the ring only to face a unanimous decision loss to Rasul Tezekbaev in June 2021. Nonetheless, 2022 marked a turning point. The fighter made a successful comeback by making his Lightweight debut, defeating Hasan Mammedov with a rear-naked choke in July. He then capped off the year with a knockout win against Yaser Ashayeri in December

== Mixed martial arts record ==
Professional record breakdown
| 34 matches | 23 wins | 10 losses |
| By knockout | 8 | 2 |
| By submission | 5 | 3 |
| By decision | 10 | 5 |
| Draws | 1 | |

| Res. | Record | Opponent | Method | Event | Date | Round | Time | Location | Notes |
|---|---|---|---|---|---|---|---|---|---|
| Win | 23–10–1 | Kushal Vyas | TKO (punches) | Octagon 45 | May 27, 2023 | 1 | 1:56 | Almaty, Kazakhstan | Return to Featherweight. |
| Win | 22–10–1 | Yaser Ashayeri | KO (punch) | Octagon 38 | December 21, 2022 | 1 | 3:32 | Almaty, Kazakhstan | Catchweight (161 lb) bout. |
| Win | 21–10–1 | Hasan Mammedov | Submission (rear-naked choke) | Octagon 32 | July 1, 2022 | 1 | 1:30 | Almaty, Kazakhstan | Lightweight debut. |
| Loss | 20–10–1 | Rasul Tezekbaev | Decision (unanimous) | Mergen Fighting Championship | June 19, 2021 | 3 | 5:00 | Atyrau, Kazakhstan | |
| Loss | 20–9–1 | Alexandre Almeida | Decision (majority) | PFL 8: 2018 Season PFL Playoffs 1 | October 5, 2018 | 2 | 5:00 | New Orleans, Louisiana, United States | 2018 PFL Featherweight Quarterfinal bout. |
| loss | 20–8–1 | Lance Palmer | Submission (rear-naked choke) | PFL 4: 2018 Regular Season | July 19, 2018 | 3 | 4:34 | Uniondale, New York, United States | |
| Loss | 20–7–1 | Andre Harrison | Decision (unanimous) | PFL 1: 2018 Regular Season | June 7, 2018 | 3 | 5:00 | New York, New York, United States | |
| Loss | 20–6–1 | Boris Fedorov | Decision (unanimous) | Modern Fighting Pankration 220 | May 26, 2018 | 3 | 5:00 | Khabarovsk, Russia | |
| Win | 20–5–1 | Sergey Yakovlev | TKO (punches) | Kunlun Fight MMA 14 | August 28, 2017 | N/A | N/A | Qingdao, Shandong, China | |
| Loss | 19–5–1 | Aliyar Sarkerov | Submission (guillotine choke) | Kunlun Fight MMA 13 | July 6, 2017 | 3 | N/A | Qingdao, China | For the vacant KLF Featherweight Championship. |
| Win | 19–4–1 | Alison Santos Marques | KO (punches) | Kunlun Fight MMA 12 | June 1, 2017 | 1 | N/A | Yantai, China | |
| Win | 18–4–1 | Paata Robakidze | KO (kick to the body) | Kunlun Fight MMA 7 | December 15, 2016 | 2 | 2:19 | Beijing, China | |
| Loss | 17–4–1 | Soo Chul Kim | TKO (punches) | Road FC 032 | July 2, 2016 | 1 | 2:51 | Changsha, China | |
| Win | 17–3–1 | Giovanni Moljo | Decision (unanimous) | WBK 15 – Ningbo | June 9, 2016 | 3 | 5:00 | Ningbo, China | |
| Win | 16–3–1 | Alison Santos Marquez | Decision (unanimous) | WBK 11: Call of Duty | March 5, 2016 | 3 | 5:00 | Ningbo, China | Won the vacant WBK Featherweight Championship. |
| Draw | 15–3–1 | Alison Santos Marques | Draw (majority) | WBK 8: Return of the King | November 21, 2015 | 3 | 5:00 | Yining, China | Return to Featherweight. |
| Loss | 15–3 | Marcus Brimage | KO (head kick) | UFC Fight Night: Rockhold vs. Bisping | November 8, 2014 | 1 | 2:58 | Sydney, Australia | |
| Loss | 15–2 | Leandro Issa | Submission (armbar) | The Ultimate Fighter: Team Edgar vs. Team Penn Finale | July 6, 2014 | 3 | 3:49 | Las Vegas, Nevada, United States | Fight of the Night. Return to Bantamweight. |
| Loss | 15–1 | Mark Eddiva | Decision (unanimous) | The Ultimate Fighter China Finale: Kim vs. Hathaway | March 1, 2014 | 3 | 5:00 | Macau, SAR, China | |
| Win | 15–0 | Yoshiki Nakahara | Decision (unanimous) | Fighting China | November 16, 2013 | 2 | 5:00 | Zhaoqing, China | Featherweight debut. |
| Win | 14–0 | Yongqiang Zhang | Technical Submission (Von Flue choke) | Ranik Ultimate Fighting Federation 6 | November 3, 2012 | 1 | 1:30 | Hohhot, China | |
| Win | 13–0 | Longyun Jiang | KO (punch) | Ranik Ultimate Fighting Federation 5 | September 8, 2012 | 1 | 1:40 | Hohhot, China | |
| Win | 12–0 | Irshaad Sayed | Decision (split) | Ranik Ultimate Fighting Federation 3 | March 24, 2012 | 3 | 5:00 | Hohhot, China | |
| Win | 11–0 | Honggang Yao | Decision (split) | Legend FC 7 | February 11, 2012 | 3 | 5:00 | Macau, SAR, China | Won Legend FC Bantamweight Championship |
| Win | 10–0 | Yanfei Zhao | Decision (unanimous) | Ranik Ultimate Fighting Federation 2 | December 17, 2011 | 3 | 5:00 | Hohhot, China | |
| Win | 9–0 | Rustam Taldiev | Decision (unanimous) | Top of the Forbidden City 7 | October 8, 2011 | 3 | 5:00 | Beijing, China | |
| Win | 8–0 | Michel Boom | Submission (armbar) | Top of the Forbidden City 5 | September 10, 2011 | 2 | 1:10 | Beijing, China | |
| Win | 7–0 | Bolin Li | KO (punch) | Ranik Ultimate Fighting Federation 1 | August 27, 2011 | 1 | 2:40 | Shanghai, China | |
| Win | 6–0 | Robert Lek | Submission (armbar) | Top of the Forbidden City 3 | August 5, 2011 | 1 | 0:56 | Beijing, China | |
| Win | 5–0 | Irshaad Sayed | Decision (unanimous) | Top of the Forbidden City 1 | July 8, 2011 | 3 | 5:00 | Beijing, China | |
| Win | 4–0 | Yu Long Fei | Decision (unanimous) | Wenwu Cup – Combat China | June 26, 2009 | 3 | 5:00 | Beijing, China | |
| Win | 3–0 | Honggang Yao | TKO (doctor stoppage) | Xian Sports University – Ultimate Wrestle | June 15, 2009 | 2 | 5:00 | Beijing, China | |
| Win | 2–0 | Zhen Wang | Submission (guillotine choke) | Ultimate Martial Arts Combat | April 18, 2009 | 2 | 1:13 | Beijing, China | |
| Win | 1–0 | Zhouwen Jiang | Decision (unanimous) | KO – China vs. Thailand | February 8, 2009 | 3 | 5:00 | Beijing, China | Bantamweight debut. |

== See also ==
- List of current UFC fighters
- List of male mixed martial artists
