= Hu Yaozong =

Chinese mixed martial arts fighter

Yaozong Hu
- Born: April 7, 1995 (age 31); Gansu, China
- Other names: Totoro
- Nationality: Chinese
- Height: 6 ft 3 in (1.91 m)
- Weight: 185 lb (84 kg; 13 st 3 lb)
- Division: Middleweight; Light heavyweight Heavyweight
- Reach: 72.0 in (183 cm)
- Stance: Orthodox
- Fighting out of: Beijing, China
- Team: Tiger Muay Thai
- Years active: 2016–present

Mixed martial arts record
- Total: 9
- Wins: 5
- By knockout: 2
- By submission: 3
- Losses: 4
- By knockout: 1
- By submission: 2
- By decision: 1

Other information
- Mixed martial arts record from Sherdog

Hu Yaozong (born April 7, 1995) is a Chinese mixed martial artist who competed in the Middleweight division of the Ultimate Fighting Championship.

== Background ==
Hu wrestled Greco-Roman when he was young, before transitioning to MMA when he was 19. In 2011 and 2012, Hu was the Gansu Provincial Greco-Roman silver medalist.

== Mixed martial arts career ==
=== Early career ===
Hu made his debut in back-to-back fights in October 2016, picking up wins on two consecutive days under the Chinese MMA Super League. All three of his career wins before the UFC came via stoppage.

=== Ultimate Fighting Championship ===
Hu, as a replacement for James Mulheron, faced Cyril Asker on November 25, 2017 at UFC Fight Night: Bisping vs. Gastelum. He lost the fight via submission in the second round.

In his sophomore performance, Hu moved down to Light Heavyweight, and faced Rashad Coulter on November 24, 2018 at UFC Fight Night: Blaydes vs. Ngannou 2. At the weigh-ins, Coulter weighed in at 208 pounds, 2 pounds over the light heavyweight non-title fight limit of 206. He was fined 20 percent of his purse, which went to Hu. Coulter won the fight by unanimous decision.

Hu tested positive for androsta-3,5-diene-7,17-dione (arimistane) and its metabolite 7β-hydroxy-androst-3,5-diene-17-one, as the result of a urine sample provided out-of-competition on March 9, 2019. Due to his cooperation with USADA and providing a dietary supplement that contained these substances, his suspension was lowered from one year to 10 months. His suspension was retroactive to the date of his failed test, and he was eligible to return January 9, 2020.

After serving his suspension and a layoff off almost 2 and a half years, Hu moved down to Middleweight and was scheduled to face Alen Amedovski on July 10, 2021 at UFC 264. However on the day of the event, the bout was pulled from the event due to COVID-19 protocols issues in Amedovski's camp. The bout was rescheduled for October 30, 2021 at UFC 267. However, Amedovski was removed from the event due to undisclosed reasons and replaced by Andre Petroski. He lost the bout at the end of the third round via arm-triangle choke.

On February 10, 2022, it was announced that Hu was released by UFC.

== Mixed martial arts record ==
Professional record breakdown
| 9 matches | 5 wins | 4 losses |
| By knockout | 2 | 1 |
| By submission | 3 | 2 |
| By decision | 0 | 1 |

| Res. | Record | Opponent | Method | Event | Date | Round | Time | Location | Notes |
|---|---|---|---|---|---|---|---|---|---|
| Loss | 5–4 | Mehdi Saremi | TKO (doctor stoppage) | Longsan Fight: Day 1 | December 20, 2025 | 2 | 5:00 | Jinhua, China | |
| Win | 5–3 | Nurkadyr Askaruly | Submission (guillotine choke) | WLF W.A.R.S. 88 | October 24, 2025 | 1 | 2:52 | Zhengzhou, China | Return to Light Heavyweight. |
| Win | 4–3 | Danier Nuerboli | Submission (kimura) | Jue Cheng King: Fight Night 96 | March 22, 2025 | 3 | 2:52 | Lüliang, China | |
| Loss | 3–3 | Andre Petroski | Submission (arm-triangle choke) | UFC 267 | October 30, 2021 | 3 | 4:46 | Abu Dhabi, United Arab Emirates | Middleweight debut. |
| Loss | 3–2 | Rashad Coulter | Decision (unanimous) | UFC Fight Night: Blaydes vs. Ngannou 2 | November 24, 2018 | 3 | 5:00 | Beijing, China | Light Heavyweight debut; Coulter missed weight (208 lb). |
| Loss | 3–1 | Cyril Asker | Submission (rear-naked choke) | UFC Fight Night: Bisping vs. Gastelum | November 25, 2017 | 2 | 2:33 | Shanghai, China | |
| Win | 3–0 | Abror Yakhyaev | TKO | Glory of Heroes: Conquest of Heroes | December 2, 2016 | 2 | N/A | Jiyuan, China | |
| Win | 2–0 | Baoleerdalai Er Da Bao | TKO (punches) | Chinese MMA Super League: Day 2 | October 15, 2016 | 3 | 3:49 | Tianjin, China | |
| Win | 1–0 | Terigenle | Submission (guillotine choke) | Chinese MMA Super League: Day 1 | October 14, 2016 | 1 | 3:03 | Tianjin, China | Heavyweight debut. |

== See also ==
- List of male mixed martial artists
