= Soa Palelei =

Australian mixed martial artist and actor (born 1977)

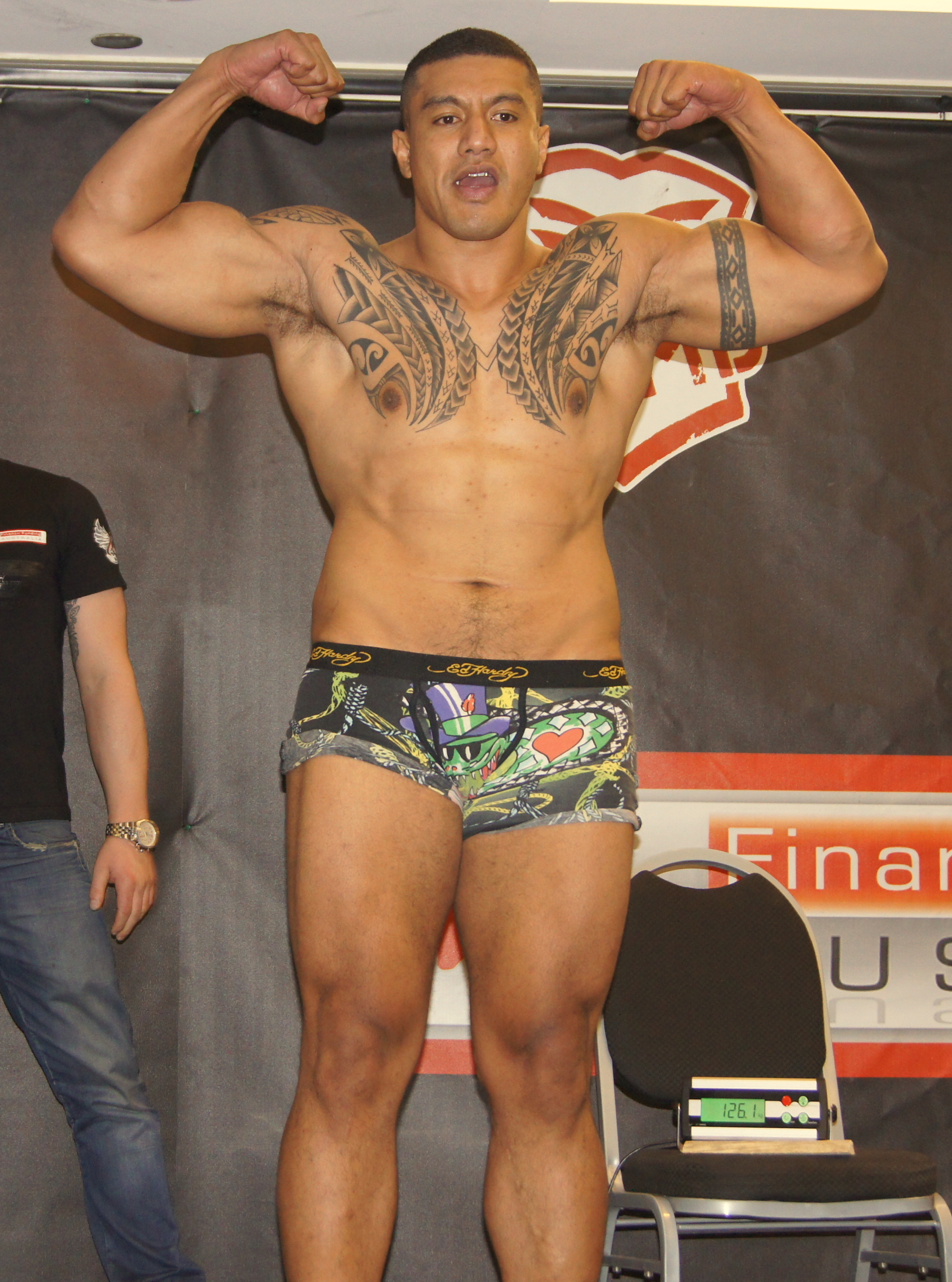
- Born: 12 July 1977 (age 49); Newcastle, New South Wales, Australia
- Other names: The Hulk
- Height: 6 ft 4 in (193 cm)
- Weight: 265 lb (120 kg; 18 st 13 lb)
- Division: Heavyweight; Super Heavyweight
- Reach: 81 in (210 cm)
- Style: Wrestling, BJJ, Kickboxing
- Fighting out of: Perth, Western Australia, Australia
- Team: Team Hulk
- Rank: Black belt in Brazilian Jiu-Jitsu
- Years active: 2002–2015 (MMA)

Mixed martial arts record
- Total: 27
- Wins: 22
- By knockout: 18
- By submission: 4
- Losses: 5
- By knockout: 3
- By submission: 1
- By decision: 1

Other information
- Website: http://www.soathehulk.com/
- Mixed martial arts record from Sherdog

Soa Palelei (born 12 July 1977) is an Australian retired mixed martial artist. A professional from 2002 until 2015, he most notably competed for the Ultimate Fighting Championship and PRIDE Fighting Championships.

== Background ==
Born in 1977, Newcastle, New South Wales, of Tongan descent, Palelei started his fighting career at an early age. Wrestling was his first choice in the earlier years and nearly saw him compete for Australia at the Olympics in Sydney. Palelei's interest quickly grew in the arena of martial arts and from there his love of the mixed martial arts grew.

=== Personal life ===
Palelei has a mentoring program called Hulk Kids MMA, in which he mentors teens on every aspect of life, combined with training and diet tips this program is available for schools and community groups.

Palelei published a memoir, titled Face Your Fears, in June 2016.

== Acting career ==
Palelei made his acting debut in the 2014 Australian film, Son of a Gun, playing the role of a henchmen Tommy alongside Ewan McGregor, Matt Nable and Brenton Thwaites. Since then Palelei has played the lead in Zombie Ninjas Vs Black Ops which is due to be released in 2015, and Football Breakers an Australian Comedy. In 2017 Palelei appeared alongside Matt Nable, Ryan Corr, Abbey Leigh, Eddie Baroo and Simone Kessell in 1%.

== Mixed martial arts career ==
=== Early career ===
Palelei made his professional MMA debut in September 2002. He was undefeated for the first two years of his career, going 7–0 with all wins either by TKO or submission. He suffered his first defeat via submission to Choi Mu-Bae at PRIDE 28 in October 2004.

=== Ultimate Fighting Championship ===
Palelei had a brief stint in the UFC at UFC 79 against Eddie Sanchez, losing by TKO in the third round. He was released from the promotion shortly after.

=== Post-UFC ===
He was at one stage linked a fight at ONE FC – Pride of a Nation against former UFC Heavyweight Champion Andrei Arlovski, however ONE FC officials pulled him from the fight as he refused to sign a five-fight exclusive contract with ONE Fighting Championship. He was replaced by former UFC Heavyweight Champion Tim Sylvia.

After his release from the UFC in 2007, Palelei went 10–1 including wins over UFC veterans Brad Morris and Sean McCorkle. He defeated McCorkle in the main event at Australian Fighting Championship (AFC) 4 via technical knock-out in round one and defended his AFC heavyweight title he won at AFC 3.

=== Return to UFC ===
In March 2013, Palelei signed a multi fight deal with the UFC.

Palelei was expected to face Stipe Miocic on 15 June 2013 at UFC 161 until Miocic was reassigned to fight Roy Nelson as a replacement on the main card and Palelei was pulled from the event.

Palelei faced UFC newcomer Nikita Krylov at UFC 164. He won the fight via third-round TKO in a lackluster fight which saw both fighters exhausted after the first round. It was later revealed that Palelei suffered a fractured rib during the week before the fight.

Palelei next faced Pat Barry at UFC Fight Night 33 on 7 December 2013. He won the fight via knockout in the first round, after achieving full mount position and landing a barrage of punches.

Palelei faced promotional newcomer Ruan Potts on 10 May 2014 at UFC Fight Night 40. He won the fight via knockout, again from a full mount, in the first round.

Palelei faced Jared Rosholt on 28 June 2014 at UFC Fight Night 43. Palelei lost the fight via unanimous decision.

Palelei was expected to face Daniel Omielańczuk on 8 November 2014 at UFC Fight Night 55. However, Omielańczuk was forced to pull out of bout with a broken thumb and was replaced by Walt Harris. He won the fight by TKO in the second round.

Palelei faced Antônio Silva on 1 August 2015 at UFC 190. He lost the fight by TKO in the second round. In turn, Palelei announced his retirement from MMA on 19 October 2015.

== Accomplishments ==
- Australian Fighting Championship (AFC) World Heavy Weight Champion
- K-OZ Entertainment World Super Heavy Weight Champion
- IKBF Super Heavy Weight World Champion
- Australian Heavy Weight Mixed Martial Arts Champion
- Australian Heavy Weight Brazilian Jiu-Jitsu
- W.A Brazilian Jiu-Jitsu Heavy Weight Champion
- W.A Freestyle Wrestling Champion at 120 kg
- W.A MMA Heavy Weight Champion
- Australian Freestyle Wrestling Champion at 120 kg
- ADCC Australian Heavy Weight Submission Champion
- South Pacific MMA Heavy Weight Champion

== Mixed martial arts record ==
Professional record breakdown
27 matches	22 wins	5 losses
By knockout	18	3
By submission	4	1
By decision	0	1

Res.	Record	Opponent	Method	Event	Date	Round	Time	Location	Notes
Loss	22–5	Antônio Silva	TKO (punches)	UFC 190	1 August 2015	2	0:41	Rio de Janeiro, Brazil	
Win	22–4	Walt Harris	TKO (punches)	UFC Fight Night: Rockhold vs. Bisping	8 November 2014	2	4:49	Sydney, Australia	
Loss	21–4	Jared Rosholt	Decision (unanimous)	UFC Fight Night: Te Huna vs. Marquardt	28 June 2014	3	5:00	Auckland, New Zealand	
Win	21–3	Ruan Potts	KO (punch)	UFC Fight Night: Brown vs. Silva	10 May 2014	1	2:20	Cincinnati, Ohio, United States	
Win	20–3	Pat Barry	KO (punches)	UFC Fight Night: Hunt vs. Bigfoot	7 December 2013	1	2:09	Brisbane, Australia	
Win	19–3	Nikita Krylov	TKO (punches)	UFC 164	31 August 2013	3	1:34	Milwaukee, Wisconsin, United States	
Win	18–3	Sean McCorkle	TKO (punches)	Australian Fighting Championship 4	7 December 2012	1	1:45	Melbourne, Australia	Defended the AFC Heavyweight Championship.
Win	17–3	Bob Sapp	TKO (punches)	Cage Fighting Championship 21	18 May 2012	1	0:12	Sydney, Australia	
Win	16–3	Joe Kielur	TKO (punches)	Australian Fighting Championship 3	14 April 2012	1	1:14	Melbourne, Australia	Won the AFC Heavyweight Championship.
Win	15–3	Shunske Inoue	TKO (punches)	Cage Fighting Championship 20	24 February 2012	2	4:08	Gold Coast, Australia	
Win	14–3	Henry Miller	TKO (punches)	K-Oz Entertainment: Bragging Rights	21 January 2012	1	1:26	Perth, Australia	Won the K-Oz Entertainment Super Heavyweight Championship.
Win	13–3	Matt Walker	TKO (punches)	Cage Fighting Championship 19	9 December 2011	1	0:16	Sydney, Australia	
Win	12–3	Son Hai Suk	TKO (punches)	Australian Fighting Championship 2	3 September 2011	1	0:28	Melbourne, Australia	
Win	11–3	Yusuke Kawaguchi	TKO (punches)	Australian Fighting Championship 1	25 June 2011	1	N/A	Melbourne, Australia	
Loss	10–3	Daniel Cormier	TKO (submission to punches)	Xtreme MMA 3	5 November 2010	1	2:23	Sydney, Australia	For the XMMA Heavyweight Championship.
Win	10–2	Brad Morris	Submission (keylock)	Impact FC 2	18 July 2010	1	4:20	Sydney, Australia	
Win	9–2	Leamy Tato	Submission (armbar)	XFC: Return of the Hulk	14 March 2009	1	0:56	Perth, Australia	
Loss	8–2	Eddie Sanchez	TKO (punches)	UFC 79	29 December 2007	3	3:24	Paradise, Nevada, United States	
Win	8–1	Shaun Vanof	KO (punch)	KOTC: Perth	5 October 2007	1	0:05	Perth, Australia	
Loss	7–1	Choi Mu-Bae	Submission (rear-naked choke)	PRIDE 28	31 October 2004	2	4:55	Saitama, Japan	
Win	7–0	Vince Lucero	TKO (punches)	Shooto Australia – NHB	20 May 2004	1	N/A	Melbourne, Australia	
Win	6–0	Lance Cartwright	TKO (injury)	XFC 4 – Australia vs The World	19 March 2004	1	0:38	Queensland, Australia	
Win	5–0	Christian Wellisch	TKO (punches)	Shooto Australia – NHB	12 February 2004	2	4:33	Melbourne, Australia	
Win	4–0	Don Richards	TKO (submission to punches)	Shooto Australia – NHB	13 November 2003	1	N/A	Melbourne, Australia	
Win	3–0	Edwin Montevgini	Submission (armbar)	After Dark Fight Night 3	1 August 2003	2	1:15	Australia	
Win	2–0	Gerald Burton-Batty	TKO (punches)	Thunderdome	21 February 2003	1	0:49	Perth, Australia	
Win	1–0	Brad Morris	TKO (doctor stoppage)	Xtreme Fight Night	27 September 2002	4	3:00	Australia	

== See also ==
- List of male mixed martial artists
