= Cyril Asker =

French mixed martial arts fighter

- Born: December 24, 1985 (age 40); Sorgues, France
- Other names: Silverback
- Nationality: French
- Height: 6 ft 0 in (1.83 m)
- Weight: 244 lb (111 kg; 17 st 6 lb)
- Division: Heavyweight
- Reach: 74 in (188 cm)
- Fighting out of: Nimes, France
- Team: Bushido Academie
- Rank: Brown belt in Brazilian Jiu-Jitsu; Red belt in Taekwondo
- Years active: 2012–present

Mixed martial arts record
- Total: 13
- Wins: 9
- By knockout: 4
- By submission: 3
- By decision: 2
- Losses: 4
- By knockout: 3
- By submission: 1

Other information
- Mixed martial arts record from Sherdog

Cyril Asker (born December 24, 1985) is a French mixed martial artist who competed in the Heavyweight division of the Ultimate Fighting Championship.

== Background ==
Born and raised in Avignon, France, Asker began training in MMA at the age of 18. Before becoming a full-time fighter, he was a police officer.

== Mixed martial arts career ==
=== Ultimate Fighting Championship ===
Asker made his promotional debut against Jared Cannonier at UFC Fight Night: Rothwell vs. dos Santos on April 10, 2016. He was defeated via knockout in the first round.

Asker next fought Dmitry Smolyakov at UFC Fight Night: Rodríguez vs. Penn on January 15, 2017. He won the fight via TKO in the first round.

Asker next faced Walt Harris at UFC Fight Night: Holm vs. Correia on June 17, 2017. He lost the fight in the first round via TKO due to a combination of elbows and punches.

Asker was expected to face James Mulheron on November 25, 2017, at UFC Fight Night 122. However, Mulheron was pulled from the card on November 10 after he failed an out-of-competition drug test. Asker remained on the card and faced promotional newcomer Hu Yaozong. He won the fight via submission in the second round.

Asker faced Tai Tuivasa on February 11, 2018, at UFC 221. He lost the fight via technical knock out in the first round.

On March 19, 2020, it was reported that Asker was no longer part of the UFC roster.

== Championships and accomplishments ==
- Extreme Fighting Championship (EFC)
  - EFC Heavyweight Championship (One time)

== Mixed martial arts record ==
Professional record breakdown
13 matches	9 wins	4 losses
By knockout	4	3
By submission	3	1
By decision	2	0

Res.	Record	Opponent	Method	Event	Date	Round	Time	Location	Notes
Loss	9–4	Tai Tuivasa	TKO (punches and elbows)	UFC 221	February 11, 2018	1	2:18	Perth, Australia	
Win	9–3	Hu Yaozong	Submission (rear-naked choke)	UFC Fight Night: Bisping vs. Gastelum	November 25, 2017	2	2:33	Shanghai, China	
Loss	8–3	Walt Harris	TKO (punches and elbows)	UFC Fight Night: Holm vs. Correia	June 17, 2017	1	1:44	Kallang, Singapore	
Win	8–2	Dmitry Smolyakov	TKO (punches and elbows)	UFC Fight Night: Rodríguez vs. Penn	January 15, 2017	1	2:41	Phoenix, Arizona, United States	
Loss	7–2	Jared Cannonier	KO (punches and elbows)	UFC Fight Night: Rothwell vs. dos Santos	April 10, 2016	1	2:44	Zagreb, Croatia	
Win	7–1	Andrew van Zyl	Submission (guillotine choke)	Extreme Fighting Championship 44	October 3, 2015	1	3:25	Johannesburg, South Africa	Won the EFC Heavyweight Championship.
Win	6–1	Ruan Potts	TKO (retirement)	Extreme Fighting Championship 40	June 6, 2015	1	5:00	Johannesburg, South Africa	
Win	5–1	Ricky Misholas	Decision (unanimous)	Extreme Fighting Championship 37	February 21, 2015	3	5:00	Johannesburg, South Africa	
Win	4–1	Juhaa Saarinen	TKO (punches)	Cage 27	November 8, 2014	2	4:19	Turku, Finland	
Win	3–1	Eugen Buchmueller	Submission (rear-naked choke)	Roundhouse MMA: The Beginning	October 6, 2013	1	0:59	Berlin, Germany	
Loss	2–1	Karl Moore	Submission (rear-naked choke)	CC 17: Rooney vs. Philpott	May 25, 2013	3	N/A	Newry, Northern Ireland	
Win	2–0	Peter Tornow	Decision (unanimous)	MMA Berlin: Tournament 33	March 16, 2013	3	5:00	Berlin, Germany	
Win	1–0	Adam Brearley	TKO (punches)	Cage Warriors Fight Night 4	March 16, 2012	1	4:30	Dubai, United Arab Emirates	
