= Garreth McLellan =

Mixed martial artist

- Born: 9 January 1982 (age 44); Vereeniging, Gauteng, South Africa
- Other names: Soldier Boy
- Height: 6 ft 1 in (1.85 m)
- Weight: 185 lb (84 kg; 13.2 st)
- Division: Middleweight
- Reach: 72 in (183 cm)
- Stance: Orthodox
- Fighting out of: Johannesburg, South Africa
- Team: Ultimate MMA Fitness; FightFitMilitia
- Rank: Black belt in Karate; Black belt in Brazilian Jiu-Jitsu
- Years active: 2009–present

Mixed martial arts record
- Total: 20
- Wins: 13
- By knockout: 3
- By submission: 9
- By decision: 1
- Losses: 7
- By knockout: 4
- By submission: 1
- By decision: 2

Other information
- Mixed martial arts record from Sherdog

Garreth McLellan (born 9 January 1982) is a South African professional mixed martial artist who competed in the Middleweight division of the EFC where he is a former champion. A professional since 2009, he was one of the first South African MMA fighters to compete in the UFC and also holds a win against former UFC Middleweight champion Dricus du Plessis.

== Background ==
Born and raised in South Africa, McLellan began training in karate at the age of nine and also played rugby union. At the age of 19, McLellan was playing flanker for the Crusaders Rugby Club in Durban when he was offered a contract to compete for the Natal Sharks. Working with Jason Vorster, the team's fitness coach and an MMA trainer, McLellan would eventually make the transition to mixed martial arts. In karate, McLellan was a national champion and also won a national title in grappling.

== Mixed martial arts career ==
=== Early career ===
McLellan compiled an amateur record of 10–0 before making his professional debut in 2009, competing exclusively for regional promotions in his native South Africa, and was a two-time EFC AFRICA champion. He compiled a professional record of 12–2, before signing with the UFC in December 2014.

=== Ultimate Fighting Championship ===
McLellan made his promotional debut against Bartosz Fabiński on 11 April 2015 at UFC Fight Night 64. He lost the fight via unanimous decision.

McLellan faced Bubba Bush on 24 October 2015 at UFC Fight Night 76. He won the fight via TKO in the closing seconds of the third round.

McLellan next faced Magnus Cedenblad on 8 May 2016 at UFC Fight Night 87. He lost the fight via TKO in the second round.

McLellan was defeated by Alessio Di Chirico on 27 August 2016 at UFC on Fox 21. He lost the fight via split decision.

McLellan faced promotional newcomer Paulo Costa on 11 March 2017 at UFC Fight Night 106. He lost the fight via TKO in the first round.

== Championships and accomplishments ==
- Extreme Fighting Championship (EFC)
  - EFC Middleweight World Championship (Two times)
    - Two title defences

== Mixed martial arts record ==
Professional record breakdown
20 matches	13 wins	7 losses
By knockout	3	4
By submission	9	1
By decision	1	2

Res.	Record	Opponent	Method	Event	Date	Round	Time	Location	Notes
Loss	13–7	Brendan Lesar	KO (punch)	EFC Africa 80	29 June 2019	1	3:06	Sibaya, South Africa	For the interim EFC Middleweight Championship.
Loss	13–6	Paulo Costa	TKO (punches)	UFC Fight Night: Belfort vs. Gastelum	11 March 2017	1	1:17	Fortaleza, Brazil	
Loss	13–5	Alessio Di Chirico	Decision (split)	UFC on Fox: Maia vs. Condit	27 August 2016	3	5:00	Vancouver, British Columbia, Canada	
Loss	13–4	Magnus Cedenblad	TKO (head kick and punches)	UFC Fight Night: Overeem vs. Arlovski	8 May 2016	2	0:47	Rotterdam, Netherlands	
Win	13–3	Bubba Bush	TKO (punches)	UFC Fight Night: Holohan vs. Smolka	24 October 2015	3	4:58	Dublin, Ireland	
Loss	12–3	Bartosz Fabiński	Decision (unanimous)	UFC Fight Night: Gonzaga vs. Cro Cop 2	11 April 2015	3	5:00	Kraków, Poland	
Win	12–2	Dricus du Plessis	Submission (guillotine choke)	EFC Africa 33	30 August 2014	3	1:44	Durban, South Africa	Defended the EFC Middleweight Championship.
Win	11–2	J.P. Kruger	Submission (rear-naked choke)	EFC Africa 28	27 March 2014	1	3:05	Gauteng, South Africa	Defended the EFC Middleweight Championship.
Win	10–2	Jeremy Smith	Submission (rear-naked choke)	EFC Africa 24	10 October 2013	1	N/A	Gauteng, South Africa	Won the EFC Middleweight Championship.
Win	9–2	Tumelo Muphutha	Decision (split)	EFC Africa 20	27 June 2013	3	5:00	Gauteng, South Africa	
Win	8–2	Armand de Bruyn	Submission (rear-naked choke)	EFC Africa 15	27 July 2012	1	1:22	Gauteng, South Africa	
Win	7–2	Danie van Heerden	Submission (rear-naked choke)	EFC Africa 14	1 June 2012	2	3:08	Gauteng, South Africa	
Loss	6–2	Jeremy Smith	Submission (guillotine choke)	EFC Africa 12	2 March 2012	4	0:56	Gauteng, South Africa	Lost the EFC Middleweight Championship.
Win	6–1	Jacques Joubert	Submission (guillotine choke)	EFC Africa 8	14 April 2011	4	3:14	Gauteng, South Africa	Won the inaugural EFC Middleweight Championship.
Win	5–1	Wade Henderson	Submission (rear-naked choke)	EFC Africa 5	21 October 2010	2	3:38	Gauteng, South Africa	
Win	4–1	Warren Allison	Submission (armbar)	EFC Africa 3	8 May 2010	1	N/A	Gauteng, South Africa	
Win	3–1	Juan Lubbe	KO (punches)	EFC Africa 2	10 March 2010	1	N/A	Gauteng, South Africa	
Win	2–1	Barry Britz	TKO (punches)	EFC Africa 1	12 November 2009	1	N/A	Gauteng, South Africa	
Loss	1–1	Wade Henderson	TKO (punches)	Fight Force 1	26 July 2009	1	N/A	Gauteng, South Africa	
Win	1–0	J.P. Kruger	Submission (armbar)	XFC Africa: Fight Club	30 May 2009	1	1:20	Gauteng, South Africa	

== See also ==
- List of current UFC fighters
- List of male mixed martial artists
