= Themba Gorimbo =

Zimbabwean mixed martial artist (born 1991)

- Born: Themba Takura Lawrence Gorimbo; January 23, 1991 (age 35); Bikita, Masvingo, Zimbabwe
- Other names: The Answer
- Height: 6 ft 1 in (1.85 m)
- Weight: 170 lb (77 kg; 12 st)
- Division: Welterweight (2013–present); Lightweight (2015)
- Reach: 77 in (196 cm)
- Fighting out of: Johannesburg, South Africa
- Team: MMA Masters
- Years active: 2013–2026

Mixed martial arts record
- Total: 21
- Wins: 14
- By knockout: 2
- By submission: 6
- By decision: 6
- Losses: 7
- By knockout: 1
- By submission: 3
- By decision: 3

Other information
- Mixed martial arts record from Sherdog

Themba Takura Lawrence Gorimbo (born January 23, 1991) is a Zimbabwean professional mixed martial artist who competes in the Welterweight division of the Ultimate Fighting Championship (UFC).

== Early life ==
Gorimbo was born in Bikita, Zimbabwe.

He lost his mom at the age of 12 and his dad at 13. He dropped out of school at the age of 16 to become a blood diamond smuggler in order to survive and take care of his younger brother. He was bitten by German Shepherd dogs after he was caught digging for blood diamond illegally at the mines. At age 17, Gorimbo fled to South Africa, where he eventually discovered mixed martial arts. He later bought his own plane ticket to go to the United States to pursue his MMA career.

== Mixed martial arts career ==
=== Ultimate Fighting Championship ===
Gorimbo was scheduled to make his promotional debut against Billy Goff on February 18, 2023 at UFC Fight Night 219. However, Goff withdrew due to undisclosed reason and was replaced by A.J. Fletcher. He lost the fight via a guillotine choke in round two.

Gorimbo faced Takashi Sato on May 20, 2023, at UFC Fight Night 223. He won the fight via unanimous decision.

Gorimbo was scheduled to face Kiefer Crosbie on February 3, 2024 at UFC Fight Night 235. However on January 5, it was announced that Crosbie pulled out due to an injury. He was replaced by Pete Rodriguez. He won the fight via technical knockout in round one.

Gorimbo faced Ramiz Brahimaj on May 18, 2024, at UFC Fight Night 241. He won the bout by unanimous decision.

Gorimbo faced Niko Price on October 12, 2024 at UFC Fight Night 244. He won the fight by unanimous decision.

Replacing Nick Diaz who withdrew for unknown reasons, Gorimbo faced Vicente Luque on December 7, 2024 at UFC 310. Gorimbo lost the fight via an anaconda choke submission 52 seconds into the first round.

Gorimbo faced Jeremiah Wells on November 1, 2025 at UFC Fight Night 263. He lost the fight by unanimous decision.

Gorimbo faced Jonathan Micallef on May 2, 2026 at UFC Fight Night 275. He lost the fight by split decision.

On May 22, 2026, Gorimbo announced his retirement from mixed martial arts.

== Personal life ==
He became the first Zimbabwean to win a fight in the Ultimate Fighting Championship.

== Philanthropy ==
In a post match interview, after his first UFC win, Gorimbo mentioned that he did not have any money, that he had $7 in his account. That caught the attention of former WWE and Hollywood star Dwayne Johnson who surprised Gorimbo at his gym. Touched by Themba's story of having $7 in his account, probably due to the fact that Johnson also had $7 after being dropped by the NFL, Johnson surprised Themba by buying him a house.

Themba started a project of drilling boreholes in Bikita, the village he grew up in, in Zimbabwe. He received assistance from the UAE Warriors (a professional mixed martial arts organisation based in Abu Dhabi) including John Rogoveanu, a philanthropist. He started with two boreholes. Fellow fighter Marlon Vera also donated to Themba's cause to building more boreholes.

He plans to build a solar-powered library in his hometown so that children can study after hours.

== Championships and accomplishments ==
- Extreme Fighting Championship
  - EFC Welterweight Champion (one time; former)
    - One title defense
- World MMA Awards
  - 2023 Fighting Spirit of the Year for charity – building a water pump in Zimbabwe and putting others ahead of himself

== Mixed martial arts record ==
Professional record breakdown
21 matches	14 wins	7 losses
By knockout	2	1
By submission	6	3
By decision	6	3

Res.	Record	Opponent	Method	Event	Date	Round	Time	Location	Notes
Loss	14–7	Jonathan Micallef	Decision (split)	UFC Fight Night: Della Maddalena vs. Prates	May 2, 2026	3	5:00	Perth, Australia	
Loss	14–6	Jeremiah Wells	Decision (unanimous)	UFC Fight Night: Garcia vs. Onama	November 1, 2025	3	5:00	Las Vegas, Nevada, United States	
Loss	14–5	Vicente Luque	Technical Submission (anaconda choke)	UFC 310	December 7, 2024	1	0:52	Las Vegas, Nevada, United States	
Win	14–4	Niko Price	Decision (unanimous)	UFC Fight Night: Royval vs. Taira	October 12, 2024	3	5:00	Las Vegas, Nevada, United States	
Win	13–4	Ramiz Brahimaj	Decision (unanimous)	UFC Fight Night: Barboza vs. Murphy	May 18, 2024	3	5:00	Las Vegas, Nevada, United States	
Win	12–4	Pete Rodriguez	TKO (punches)	UFC Fight Night: Dolidze vs. Imavov	February 3, 2024	1	0:32	Las Vegas, Nevada, United States	
Win	11–4	Takashi Sato	Decision (unanimous)	UFC Fight Night: Dern vs. Hill	May 20, 2023	3	5:00	Las Vegas, Nevada, United States	
Loss	10–4	A.J. Fletcher	Submission (guillotine choke)	UFC Fight Night: Andrade vs. Blanchfield	February 18, 2023	2	1:37	Las Vegas, Nevada, United States	
Win	10–3	Julio Rafael Rodrigues	Decision (unanimous)	Fury FC 65	June 26, 2022	3	5:00	New Orleans, Louisiana, United States	
Loss	9–3	Handesson Ferreira	Decision (unanimous)	UAE Warriors 24	October 29, 2021	3	5:00	Abu Dhabi, United Arab Emirates	
Win	9–2	Lyle Karam	Submission (triangle choke)	EFC 84	March 14, 2020	2	2:06	Pretoria, South Africa	Defended the EFC Welterweight Championship.
Win	8–2	Luke Michael	TKO (punches)	EFC 82	September 28, 2019	1	2:48	Brakpan, South Africa	Won the vacant EFC Welterweight Championship.
Win	7–2	José da Rocha Junior	Decision (unanimous)	EFC 79	May 4, 2019	3	5:00	Johannesburg, South Africa	
Loss	6–2	Dave Mazany	KO (punches)	EFC 63	September 9, 2017	2	0:39	Cape Town, South Africa	
Win	6–1	Joe Cummins	Decision (unanimous)	EFC 49	May 13, 2016	3	5:00	Johannesburg, South Africa	Return to Welterweight.
Loss	5–1	Leon Mynhardt	Submission (guillotine choke)	EFC 44	October 3, 2015	2	1:03	Johannesburg, South Africa	For the EFC Lightweight Championship.
Win	5–0	Alex Cheboub	Submission (guillotine choke)	EFC 37	February 21, 2015	1	1:50	Johannesburg, South Africa	Lightweight debut.
Win	4–0	Chaz Wasserman	Submission (brabo choke)	EFC 27	February 27, 2014	2	4:31	Gauteng, South Africa	
Win	3–0	Chimmy van Winkel	Submission (armbar)	EFC 26	December 12, 2013	1	1:59	Gauteng, South Africa	
Win	2–0	Juan Lubbe	Submission (armbar)	EFC 22	August 15, 2013	1	3:48	Gauteng, South Africa	
Win	1–0	Sydney Mokgolo	Submission (triangle choke)	Imagine FC 3	June 15, 2013	2	1:50	Gqeberha, South Africa	Welterweight debut.
