= UFC Fight Night: Overeem vs. Arlovski =

UFC mixed martial arts event in 2016

- The poster for UFC Fight Night: Overeem vs. Arlovski
- Promotion: Ultimate Fighting Championship
- Date: May 8, 2016
- Venue: Rotterdam Ahoy
- City: Rotterdam, Netherlands
- Attendance: 10,421
- Total gate: $1,523,320

Event chronology
UFC 197: Jones vs. Saint Preux	UFC Fight Night: Overeem vs. Arlovski	UFC 198: Werdum vs. Miocic

UFC Fight Night: Overeem vs. Arlovski (also known as UFC Fight Night 87) was a mixed martial arts event held on May 8, 2016, at the Rotterdam Ahoy in Rotterdam, Netherlands.

== Background ==
The event was the first that the organization hosted in the Netherlands.

The event was headlined by a heavyweight bout between the 2010 K-1 World Grand Prix Champion and former Strikeforce Heavyweight Champion Alistair Overeem and former UFC Heavyweight Champion Andrei Arlovski.

Rashid Magomedov was expected to face Chris Wade at the event. However, Magomedov pulled out of the fight in early March citing injury and was replaced by Rustam Khabilov.

Peter Sobotta was expected to face Dominic Waters at the event. However, Sobotta pulled out of the fight in late March citing injury and was replaced by Leon Edwards.

Paddy Holohan was expected to face Willie Gates at the event. However, on April 25, Holohan abruptly announced his retirement, citing a rare blood disorder. In turn, Gates faced Ulka Sasaki.

Nick Hein was expected to face Jon Tuck on the card, but pulled out just 6 days before the event due to injury. He was replaced two days later by promotional newcomer Josh Emmett.

== Results ==
Main Card (Fox Sports 1)
Weight class				Method	Round	Time	Notes
Heavyweight	Alistair Overeem	def.	Andrei Arlovski	TKO (front kick and punches)	2	1:12
Heavyweight	Stefan Struve	def.	Antônio Silva	TKO (elbows)	1	0:16
Welterweight	Gunnar Nelson	def.	Albert Tumenov	Submission (rear-naked choke)	2	3:15
Women's Bantamweight	Germaine de Randamie	def.	Anna Elmose	TKO (knee to the body and punches)	1	3:46
Light Heavyweight	Nikita Krylov	def.	Francimar Barroso	Submission (rear-naked choke)	2	3:11
Women's Strawweight	Karolina Kowalkiewicz	def.	Heather Jo Clark	Decision (unanimous) (29–28, 29–28, 30–27)	3	5:00
Preliminary Card (Fox Sports 1)
Lightweight	Rustam Khabilov	def.	Chris Wade	Decision (unanimous) (30–27, 29–28, 29–28)	3	5:00
Middleweight	Magnus Cedenblad	def.	Garreth McLellan	TKO (head kick and punches)	2	0:47
Lightweight	Josh Emmett	def.	Jon Tuck	Decision (split) (29–28, 28–29, 29–28)	3	5:00
Lightweight	Reza Madadi	def.	Yan Cabral	TKO (punches)	3	1:56
Preliminary Card (UFC Fight Pass)
Flyweight	Kyoji Horiguchi	def.	Neil Seery	Decision (unanimous) (30–26, 30–27, 30–27)	3	5:00
Welterweight	Leon Edwards	def.	Dominic Waters	Decision (unanimous) (30–27, 30–27, 30–27)	3	5:00
Flyweight	Ulka Sasaki	def.	Willie Gates	Submission (rear-naked choke)	2	3:30

== Bonus awards ==
The following fighters were awarded $50,000 bonuses:

- Fight of the Night: None awarded
- Performance of the Night: Alistair Overeem, Stefan Struve, Gunnar Nelson and Germaine de Randamie

== See also ==
- List of UFC events
- 2016 in UFC
