= Danny Henry =

Scottish mixed martial artist

- Born: 17 July 1988 (age 38); Edinburgh, Scotland
- Other names: The Hatchet
- Height: 5 ft 11 in (1.80 m)
- Weight: 145 lb (66 kg; 10.4 st)
- Division: Featherweight
- Reach: 73 in (190 cm)
- Fighting out of: Edinburgh, Scotland, United Kingdom
- Team: Higher Level Martial Arts
- Years active: 2011–2020

Mixed martial arts record
- Total: 16
- Wins: 12
- By knockout: 5
- By submission: 5
- By decision: 2
- Losses: 4
- By submission: 2
- By decision: 2

Other information
- Mixed martial arts record from Sherdog

Danny Henry (born 17 July 1988) is a Scottish professional mixed martial artist who competed in the Featherweight division of the Ultimate Fighting Championship.

== Mixed martial arts career ==
=== Early career ===
Henry began his MMA career in 2011. Before joining the UFC, Henry amassed a record of 10-2. Henry fought the majority of his fights in South Africa with EFC Worldwide and in his final fight for their promotion beat Igeu Kabesa for their featherweight championship.

=== Ultimate Fighting Championship ===
Henry made his promotional debut on 16 July 2017 at UFC Fight Night 113 against Daniel Teymur. He won the fight by unanimous decision earning Fight of the Night honors.

Henry faced Hakeem Dawodu on 17 March 2018 at UFC Fight Night 127. He won his fight against the sizable favourite Dawodu via guillotine 39 seconds into the first round.

Henry faced Dan Ige at UFC Fight Night 147 on 16 March 2019. He lost the fight via a rear-naked choke submission in the first round.

Henry was briefly linked to a bout with Mike Davis on 26 September 2019 at UFC Fight Night 160. However, Henry pulled out of the bout for undisclosed reasons in mid-September. In turn, Davis was pulled from the card and is expected to be rescheduled for a future event.

Henry was expected to face promotional newcomer Peter Barrett on 25 April 2020. However, on 9 April, Dana White, the president of UFC, announced that this event would be postponed to a future date

Henry faced Makwan Amirkhani on 12 July 2020 at UFC 251. He lost the fight via a submission in round one.

Henry was expected to face Ricardo Ramos on 3 September 2022 at UFC Fight Night 209. However, the bout was cancelled after Henry withdrew for unknown reasons.

On 16 April 2024, it was announced that Henry was no longer on the UFC roster.

== Championships and awards ==
- Ultimate Fighting Championship
  - Fight of the Night vs. Daniel Teymur
- Extreme Fighting Championship (EFC)
  - EFC Featherweight World Championship (Two times)

== Mixed martial arts record ==
Professional record breakdown
16 matches	12 wins	4 losses
By knockout	5	0
By submission	5	2
By decision	2	2

Res.	Record	Opponent	Method	Event	Date	Round	Time	Location	Notes
Loss	12–4	Makwan Amirkhani	Technical Submission (anaconda choke)	UFC 251	12 July 2020	1	3:15	Abu Dhabi, United Arab Emirates	
Loss	12–3	Dan Ige	Submission (rear-naked choke)	UFC Fight Night: Till vs. Masvidal	16 March 2019	1	1:17	London, England	
Win	12–2	Hakeem Dawodu	Technical Submission (guillotine choke)	UFC Fight Night: Werdum vs. Volkov	17 March 2018	1	0:39	London, England	
Win	11–2	Daniel Teymur	Decision (unanimous)	UFC Fight Night: Nelson vs. Ponzinibbio	16 July 2017	3	5:00	Glasgow, Scotland	Lightweight bout. Fight of the Night.
Win	10–2	Igeu Kabesa	Submission (anaconda choke)	Extreme Fighting Championship 57	4 March 2017	1	3:30	Johannesburg, South Africa	Won the EFC Featherweight Championship.
Win	9–2	Wade Groth	TKO (punches)	Extreme Fighting Championship 53	2 September 2016	2	0:39	Johannesburg, South Africa	
Win	8–2	Barend Nienaber	TKO (body kick)	Extreme Fighting Championship 51	15 July 2016	2	1:20	Johannesburg, South Africa	
Loss	7–2	Igeu Kabesa	Decision (unanimous)	Extreme Fighting Championship 47	5 March 2016	5	5:00	Johannesburg, South Africa	Lost the EFC Featherweight Championship.
Win	7–1	Boyd Allen	TKO (punches)	Extreme Fighting Championship 44	3 October 2015	4	2:31	Johannesburg, South Africa	Won the EFC Featherweight Championship.
Win	6–1	Matthew Buirski	Decision (unanimous)	Extreme Fighting Championship 42	8 August 2015	3	5:00	Cape Town, South Africa	
Win	5–1	Hanru Botha	Submission (triangle choke)	Extreme Fighting Championship 40	6 June 2015	1	1:58	Gauteng, South Africa	Featherweight debut.
Win	4–1	David Galbraith	TKO (punches)	Headhunters FC	6 December 2014	2	N/A	Edinburgh, Scotland	Won the vacant Headhunters FC Lightweight Championship.
Loss	3–1	Michael Doyle	Decision (unanimous)	On Top 6	6 October 2012	3	5:00	Glasgow, Scotland	
Win	3–0	Leon Del Gaudio	KO (punch)	On Top 5	2 June 2012	1	0:17	Glasgow, Scotland	
Win	2–0	Kieran Malone	Submission (rear-naked choke)	On Top 4	25 February 2012	1	4:04	Glasgow, Scotland	
Win	1–0	Danny Grayson	Submission (rear-naked choke)	Sportfight Scotland 14	5 November 2011	2	3:32	Lanark, Scotland	Lightweight debut.
