= PFL 8 (2018) =

Professional Fighters League MMA event in 2018

- Promotion: Professional Fighters League
- Date: October 5, 2018
- Venue: Ernest N. Morial Convention Center
- City: New Orleans, Louisiana

Event chronology
PFL 7	PFL 8	PFL 9

The PFL 8 mixed martial arts event for the 2018 season of the Professional Fighters League was held on October 5, 2018, at the Ernest N. Morial Convention Center in New Orleans, Louisiana.

== Background ==
The event was the eighth of the 2018 season and marked the start of the playoffs.

Philipe Lins was expected to face Valdrin Istrefi in a playoff bout at this event, however, Istrefi was removed due to injury and replaced by the highest ranked alternate on the undercard, Caio Alencar. As a result, Alencar's original opponent of Mike Kyle was paired with Mo De'Reese in a bout to determine a new alternate.

Timur Valiev was expected to face Alexandre de Almeida in a playoff bout at this event, however, Valiev was removed due to injury and replaced by the highest ranked alternate on the undercard, Jumabieke Tuerxun. As a result, Tuerxun's original opponent of Marcos Galvão was set to face Jeremy Kennedy in a bout to determine a new alternate. However, on the day of the event Kennedy dropped out due to undisclosed reasons, and so Galvao was automatically pushed forward as the new alternate instead.

== Fight card ==
Main Card (NBCSN)
Weight class				Method	Round	Time	Notes
Heavyweight	Josh Copeland	def.	Alex Nicholson	KO (punch)	1	1:27	(Note: Semi-final round bout of the 2018 PFL Heavyweight playoffs.)
Featherweight	Steven Siler	def.	Alexandre Almeida	DQ (illegal upkick)	2	0:52	(Note: Semi-final round bout of the 2018 PFL Featherweight playoffs.)
Heavyweight	Philipe Lins	def.	Jared Rosholt	TKO (punches)	2	0:45	(Note: Semi-final round bout of the 2018 PFL Heavyweight playoffs.)
Featherweight	Lance Palmer	def.	Andre Harrison	Decision (unanimous) (30-27, 29-28, 29-28)	3	5:00	(Note: Semi-final round bout of the 2018 PFL Featherweight playoffs.)
Heavyweight	Josh Copeland	vs.	Francimar Barroso	Draw (unanimous) (19-19, 19-19, 19-19)	2	5:00	(Note: Quarter-final round bout of the 2018 PFL Heavyweight playoffs.)
Featherweight	Steven Siler	def.	Nazareno Malegarie	Draw (majority) (20-18, 19-19, 19-19)	2	5:00	(Note: Quarter-final round bout of the 2018 PFL Featherweight playoffs.)
Preliminary card (Facebook Watch)
Heavyweight	Alex Nicholson	def.	Jack May	TKO (leg kick and punches)	1	2:03	(Note: Quarter-final round bout of the 2018 PFL Heavyweight playoffs.)
Featherweight	Alexandre Almeida	def.	Zhumabek Tursyn	Decision (majority) (20-18, 20-18, 19-19)	2	5:00	(Note: Quarter-final round bout of the 2018 PFL Featherweight playoffs.)
Heavyweight	Philipe Lins	def.	Caio Alencar	Submission (guillotine choke)	1	0:58	(Note: Quarter-final round bout of the 2018 PFL Heavyweight playoffs.)
Featherweight	Andre Harrison	def.	Alexandre Bezerra	Decision (majority) (20-18, 20-18, 19-19)	2	5:00	(Note: Quarter-final round bout of the 2018 PFL Featherweight playoffs.)
Heavyweight	Jared Rosholt	def.	Kelvin Tiller	Decision (unanimous) (20-18, 20-18, 20-18)	2	5:00	(Note: Quarter-final round bout of the 2018 PFL Heavyweight playoffs.)
Featherweight	Lance Palmer	def.	Max Coga	Decision (unanimous) (20-18, 20-18, 20-18)	2	5:00	(Note: Quarter-final round bout of the 2018 PFL Featherweight playoffs.)
Heavyweight	Mo De'Reese	def.	Mike Kyle	TKO (strikes)	1	2:38	(Note: 2018 PFL Heavyweight playoffs Alternate.)

== 2018 PFL Heavyweight playoffs ==
Quarter-finals
(Brazil) Francimar Barroso (1)	L
(United States) Josh Copeland (8)	Draw 2
(United States) Jack May (4)	L
(United States) Alex Nicholson (5)	TKO 1
(Brazil) Philipe Lins (3)	SUB 1
(Brazil) Caio Alencar* (9)	L
(United States) Kelvin Tiller (2)	L
(United States) Jared Rosholt (7)	UD 2

Semi-finals
(United States) Josh Copeland (8)	KO 1
(United States) Alex Nicholson (5)	L
(Brazil) Philipe Lins (3)	TKO 2
(United States) Jared Rosholt (7)	L

Final
(United States) Josh Copeland (8)	L
(Brazil) Philipe Lins (3)	TKO 4

* Valdrin Istrefi was originally scheduled to face Philipe Lins but was forced to pull out of the bout. He was replaced by Caio Alencar.

Legend
(SD)	(Split Decision)
(UD)	(Unanimous Decision)
(MD)	(Majority Decision)
SUB	Submission
(T)KO	(Technical) Knock Out
L	Loss

== 2018 PFL Featherweight playoffs ==
Quarter-finals
(United States) Steven Siler (1)	Draw 2
(Argentina) Nazareno Malegarie (8)	L
(China) Jumabieke Tuerxun* (11)	L
(Brazil) Alexandre Almeida (5)	MD 2
(United States) Andre Harrison (3)	MD 2
(Brazil) Alexandre Bezerra (6)	L
(United States) Lance Palmer (2)	UD 2
(Germany) Max Coga (7)	L

Semi-finals
(United States) Steven Siler (1)	DQ 2
(Brazil) Alexandre Almeida (5)	L
(United States) Andre Harrison (3)	L
(United States) Lance Palmer (2)	UD 3

Final
(United States) Steven Siler (1)	L
(United States) Lance Palmer (2)	UD 5

* Timur Valiev was originally scheduled to face Alexandre Almeida but was forced to pull out of the bout. He was replaced by Jumabieke Tuerxun.

Legend
(SD)	(Split Decision)
(UD)	(Unanimous Decision)
(MD)	(Majority Decision)
SUB	Submission
(T)KO	(Technical) Knock Out
L	Loss

== See also ==
- List of PFL events
- List of current PFL fighters
