= Extreme Fighting Championship =

South African mixed martial arts promotion company

- Industry: Mixed martial arts promotion
- Founded: September 2009
- Founders: Cairo Howarth; Silas Howarth; Calvin Howarth
- Headquarters: Paulshof, Johannesburg, South Africa
- Key people: Cairo Howarth; Silas Howarth; Calvin Howarth; Graeme Cartmell
- Website: http://www.efcworldwide.com/

Extreme Fighting Championship (EFC) is a South African mixed martial arts promotion company established since 2009. It is the largest MMA promotion company on the continent of Africa and features on its roster professional fighters from across the world including the United States, Europe, South America, the UK, Australia, and Africa. The organization produces 10 live events annually. They currently have over 120 athletes exclusively contracted to the organisation. EFC events are currently broadcast in over 120 countries around the world on numerous television networks in multiple languages. To date, EFC has held 132 events (130 numbered events and 2 fight night events) and presided over approximately 1,000 matches.

== History ==
EFC was founded in 2009 by brothers Cairo Howarth, Silas Howarth, and Calvin Howarth who are the present owners and along with Graeme Cartmell, who is the Vice President of Talent and Matchmaker, are the key people in the company. Prior to 2009, the Howarth brothers were great admirers of the UFC and would regularly watch UFC events through pay per view channels. This inspired them to create an African-based MMA promotion company modelled on the UFC which they named Extreme Fighting Championship (EFC). EFC's inaugural event took place at the Ticketpro Dome (formerly the Coca-Cola Dome) in Johannesburg, South Africa on 10 November 2009. The first 7 events took place at the Ticketpro Dome in Johannesburg. From the 8th event in 2011 onwards, the organization held events in other major cities throughout South Africa which to date includes Cape Town, Durban, Carnival City Casino, Sun City Casino, Pretoria and Johannesburg. When the demand to watch EFC events grew, they signed television broadcasting and streaming deals with a number of media organizations throughout the world. Today EFC has broadcasting deals in place with Multichoice Supersport, SABC Sport, Uganda Broadcasting Corporation, CSI Sports, DAZN, Best4Sport, and IB Sports.

== Rules ==
Extreme Fighting Championship's rules were initially drafted and aligned by Marius Lotter, the then regulator for Amateur and Professional MMA and are based upon the Unified Rules of Mixed Martial Arts. All bouts are contested over three, five-minute rounds, with the exception of five-round championship bouts. There is a one-minute rest period between rounds. As per the Unified Rules of MMA, Extreme Fighting Championship only allows competitors to fight in approved shorts, without shoes or any other sort of foot padding. Fighters must use approved light gloves (4-6 ounces) that allow fingers to grab. The referee has the right to stop the fighters and stand them up if they reach a stalemate on the ground (where neither are in a dominant position nor working toward one) after a verbal warning.

=== Match outcome ===
Matches usually end via:

- Submission: a fighter taps on the mat or his opponent three times (or more) or verbally submits.
- Knockout: a fighter falls from a legal blow and is either unconscious or unable to immediately continue.
- Technical Knockout: stoppage of the fight by the referee if it is determined a fighter cannot "intelligently defend" himself or by ringside doctor due to injury.
- Judges' Decision: Depending on scoring, a match may end as:
  - unanimous decision (all three judges score a win for one fighter),
  - split decision (two judges score a win for one fighter with the third for the other),
  - majority decision (two judges score a win for one fighter with one for a draw),
  - unanimous draw (all three judges score a draw),
  - majority draw (two judges score a draw).
  - split draw (the total points for each fighter is equal)

A fight can also end in a technical decision, technical draw, disqualification, forfeit or no contest.

=== Judging criteria ===
The ten-point must system is used for all EFC bouts; three judges score each round and the winner of each receives ten points, the loser nine points or less. If the round is even, both fighters receive ten points. The decision is announced at the end of the match, but the judge's scorecards are not announced.

=== Fouls ===
The following are considered fouls in EFC bouts:

1. Butting with the head.
2. Eye gouging of any kind.
3. Biting.
4. Hair pulling.
5. Groin attacks of any kind.
6. Fish hooking, gouging as in self-defense and some martial arts.
7. Putting a finger into any orifice or into any cut or laceration on an opponent.
8. Small joint manipulation.
9. Striking to the spine or the back of the head. (see Rabbit punch)
10. Striking downward using the point of the elbow. (see Elbow (strike))
11. Throat strikes of any kind, including, without limitation, grabbing the trachea.
12. Clawing, pinching or twisting the flesh.
13. Grabbing the clavicle.
14. Kicking the head of a grounded opponent.
15. Kneeing the head of a grounded opponent.
16. Stomping a grounded opponent.
17. Kicking to the kidney with the heel.
18. Spiking an opponent to the canvas on his head or neck. (see piledriver (professional wrestling))
19. Throwing an opponent out of the ring or fenced area.
20. Holding the shorts or gloves of an opponent.
21. Spitting at an opponent.
22. Engaging in an unsportsmanlike conduct that causes an injury to an opponent.
23. Holding the ropes or the fence.
24. Using abusive language in the ring or fenced area.
25. Attacking an opponent on or during the break.
26. Attacking an opponent who is under the care of the referee.
27. Attacking an opponent after the bell has sounded the end of the period of unarmed combat.
28. Flagrantly disregarding the instructions of the referee.
29. Timidity, including, without limitation, avoiding contact with an opponent, intentionally or consistently dropping the mouthpiece or faking an injury.
30. Interference by the corner.
31. Throwing in the towel during competition.

When a foul is charged, the referee in their discretion may deduct one or more points as a penalty. If a foul incapacitates a fighter, then the match may end in a disqualification if the foul was intentional, or a no contest if unintentional. If a foul causes a fighter to be unable to continue later in the bout, it ends with a technical decision win to the injured fighter if the injured fighter is ahead on points, otherwise it is a technical draw.

== Current champions ==
Class	Upper weight limit	Champion	Event	Date	Source
Heavyweight	265 lb (120 kg; 18.9 st)	(South Africa) Terrence Born def. Matunga Djikasa	EFC 138; World Sports Betting EFC Arena, Johannesburg, South Africa	1 October 2026	
Light Heavyweight	205 lb (93 kg; 14.6 st)	(South Africa) JC Lamprecht def. Mzwandile Hlongwa	EFC 106; EFC Performance Institute, Johannesburg, South Africa	10 August 2023	
Middleweight	185 lb (84 kg; 13.2 st)	(South Africa) Diego Bandu def. Luke Michael	EFC 131 randWest Grand Arena, Cape Town, South Africa	26 February 2026	
Welterweight	170 lb (77 kg; 12 st)	(South Africa) Zaakir Badat def. Ziko Makengele	EFC 113; EFC Performance Institute, Johannesburg, South Africa	9 May 2024	
Lightweight	155 lb (70 kg; 11.1 st)	(South Africa) Martin Van Staden def. Igeu Kabesa	EFC 120; EFC Performance Institute, Johannesburg, South Africa	12 December 2024	
Lightweight	155 lb (70 kg; 11.1 st)	Interim (South Africa) Adrian Sanchez def. Jeferson Pereira	EFC 131; GrandWest Grand Arena, Cape Town, South Africa	26 February 2026	
Featherweight	145 lb (66 kg; 10.4 st)	(Democratic Republic of the Congo) Igeu Kabesa def. Nerik Simões	EFC 95; EFC Performance Institute, Johannesburg, South Africa	16 July 2022	
Featherweight	145 lb (66 kg; 10.4 st)	Interim (South Africa) Faeez Jacobs def. Shadrack Yemba	EFC 137; World Sports Betting EFC Arena, Johannesburg, South Africa	10 September 2026	
Bantamweight	135 lb (61 kg; 9.6 st)	(South Africa) Faeez Jacobs def. Vince Bembe	EFC 117; FC Performance Institute, Johannesburg, South Africa	12 September 2024	
Flyweight	125 lb (57 kg; 8.9 st)	(South Africa) Tumelo Manyamala def. Ntando Zondi	EFC 131; GrandWest Grand Arena, Cape Town, South Africa	26 February 2026	
Women's Bantamweight	135 lb (61 kg; 9.6 st)	(Nigeria) Juliet Chukwu def. Dayne van Wyk	EFC 119; EFC Performance Institute, Johannesburg, South Africa	11 November 2024	
Women's Flyweight	125 lb (57 kg; 8.9 st)	(South Africa) Amanda Lino def. Mariana Salles	EFC 123; World Sports Betting EFC Arena, Johannesburg, South Africa	8 May 2025	
Women's Strawweight	115 lb (52 kg; 8.2 st)	Vacant			

== Men's championship history ==
=== Heavyweight World Championship ===
206 to 265 lbs (93 to 120 kg)

No.	Name	Event	Date	Defenses
1	(South Africa) Ruan Potts def. Norman Wessels	EFC 9 Johannesburg, South Africa	30 July 2011	1. def. Andrew Van Zyl at EFC 11 on 10 November 2011; 2. def. Bernardo Mikixi at EFC 16 on 19 October 2012
2	(South Africa) Andrew Van Zyl	EFC 18; Johannesburg, South Africa	1 March 2013	1. def. Sors Grobbelaar at EFC 23 on 12 September 2013
3	(South Africa) Ruan Potts (2)	EFC 26; Johannesburg, South Africa	12 December 2013	
Potts vacated the title on 10 May 2014 after signing with the UFC.
4	(South Africa) Brendon Groenewald def. Christophe Walravens	EFC 35; Cape Town, South Africa	6 November 2014	
5	(South Africa) Andrew Van Zyl (2)	EFC 39; Cape Town, South Africa	7 May 2015	
6	(France) Cyril Asker	EFC 44; Johannesburg, South Africa	3 October 2015	
Asker vacated the title on 10 April 2016 after signing with the UFC.
7	(South Africa) Danie van Heerden def. Brendon Groenewald	EFC 48; Cape Town, South Africa	22 April 2016	
van Heerden vacated the title on 15 October 2016 after leaving EFC.
8	(South Africa) Andrew Van Zyl (3) def. Elvis Moyo	EFC 54; Sun City, South Africa	15 October 2016	1. def. Wessel Mostert at EFC 61 on 8 July 2017; 2. def. Jared Vanderaa at EFC 66 on 16 December 2017
9	(Democratic Republic of the Congo) Dalcha Lungiambula	EFC 71; Johannesburg, South Africa	23 June 2018	
-	(United States) Jared Vanderaa def. Ruan Potts for interim title	EFC 76; Pretoria, South Africa	8 December 2018	
Lungiambula vacated the title in December 2018 after signing with the UFC.
10	(United States) Jared Vanderaa promoted to undisputed champion	—	9 February 2019	1. def. Ricky Misholas at EFC 77 on 16 March 2019
Vanderaa vacated the title on 4 November 2020 after signing with the UFC.
11	(South Africa) Thabani Mndebela def. Matunga Djikasa	EFC 88; Johannesburg, South Africa	14 August 2021	
Mndebela vacated the title after signing with the UAE Warriors.
12	(Democratic Republic of the Congo) Matunga Djikasa def. Vandam Mbuyi	EFC 98; Johannesburg, South Africa	6 October 2022	
Djikasa vacated the title after signing with Absolute Championship Akhmat.
13	(Réunion) Anthony Morel def. Vandam Mbuyi	EFC 115; Johannesburg, South Africa	11 July 2024	
14	(Zimbabwe) Elvis Moyo	EFC 122; Johannesburg, South Africa	10 April 2025	
Moyo was stripped of the title on 11 September 2025 after failing to make weight for his title defense against Matunga Djikasa at EFC 127.
15	(Democratic Republic of the Congo) Matunga Djikasa (2) def. Elvis Moyo	EFC 127; Johannesburg, South Africa	11 September 2025	
16	(Senegal) Adama Diop	EFC 132; Johannesburg, South Africa	10 April 2026	
Diop vacated the title on 25 August 2026 to compete on Dana White's Contender Series.
17	(South Africa) Terrence Born def. Matunga Djikasa	EFC 138; Johannesburg, South Africa	1 October 2026	

=== Light Heavyweight World Championship ===
186 to 205 lbs (84 to 93 kg)

No.	Name	Event	Date	Defenses
1	(South Africa) J.P. Joubert def. Norman Wessels	EFC 15; Johannesburg, South Africa	27 July 2012	
Joubert vacated the title after he retired.
2	(South Africa) Gideon Drotschie def. Danie van Heerden	EFC 20; Johannesburg, South Africa	27 June 2013	1. def. Fraser Opie at EFC 25 on 7 November 2013
3	(South Africa) Norman Wessels	EFC 35; Cape Town, South Africa	6 November 2014	1. def. Dalcha Lungiambula at EFC 42 on 8 August 2015
-	(Democratic Republic of the Congo) Dalcha Lungiambula def. Tumelo Maphutha for interim title	EFC 52; Cape Town, South Africa	5 August 2016	
Wessels vacated the title on 4 March 2017 after he retired.
4	(Democratic Republic of the Congo) Dalcha Lungiambula promoted to undisputed champion	EFC 52; Cape Town, South Africa	4 March 2017	1. def. Alan Baudot at EFC 61 on 8 July 2017; 2. def. Stuart Austin at EFC 65 on 4 November 2017
Lungiambula vacated the title on 29 June 2019 after signing with the UFC.
5	(Cameroon) Simon Biyong def. Quinton Roussow	EFC 82; Brakpan, South Africa	28 September 2019	
Biyong vacated the title on 10 October 2020 after signing with Bellator MMA.
6	(South Africa) JC Lamprecht def. Mzwandile Hlongwa	EFC 106; Johannesburg, South Africa	10 August 2023	1. def. Edson Silva at EFC 123 on 8 May 2025

=== Middleweight World Championship ===
171 to 185 lbs (77 to 84 kg)

No.	Name	Event	Date	Defenses
1	(South Africa) Garreth McLellan def. Jacques Joubert	EFC 8 Johannesburg, South Africa	14 April 2011	
2	(South Africa) Jeremy Smith	EFC 12; Johannesburg, South Africa	2 March 2012	1. def. Darren Daniel at EFC 17 on 23 November 2012
3	(South Africa) Garreth McLellan (2)	EFC 24; Johannesburg, South Africa	10 October 2013	1. def. JP Kruger at EFC 28 on 27 March 2014; 2. def. Dricus du Plessis at EFC 33 on 30 August 2014
McLellan vacated the title on 11 April 2015 after signing with the UFC.
4	(South Africa) Liam Cleland def. Michiel Opperman	EFC 41; Johannesburg, South Africa	11 July 2015	
Cleland vacated the title on 13 May 2016 after he retired.
5	(England) Yannick Bahati def. JP Kruger	EFC 49; Johannesburg, South Africa	13 May 2016	1. def. David Buirski at EFC 56 on 9 December 2016
6	(South Africa) Dricus du Plessis	EFC 62; Johannesburg, South Africa	19 August 2017	1. def. interim champion Brendan Lesar at EFC 83 on 14 December 2019
-	(South Africa) Brendan Lesar def. Garreth McLellan for interim title	EFC 80; Sibaya, South Africa	29 June 2019	
du Plessis vacated the title on 10 October 2020 after signing with the UFC.
7	(South Africa) Luke Michael def. Pupanga Tresor	EFC 92; Johannesburg, South Africa	5 March 2022	
-	(South Africa) JP Kruger def. Conrad Seabi for interim title	EFC 103; Johannesburg, South Africa	11 May 2023	
8	(South Africa) JP Kruger	EFC 112; Johannesburg, South Africa	11 April 2024	
Kruger vacated the title on 15 July 2024 after he retired.
9	(South Africa) Luke Michael (2) def. Jaco Du Plessis	EFC 112; Johannesburg, South Africa	8 August 2024	1. def. Siyaku Dumiso at EFC 125 on 3 July 2025
10	(South Africa) Diego Bandu	EFC 131; Cape Town, South Africa	26 February 2026	

=== Welterweight World Championship ===
156 to 170 lbs (70 to 77 kg)

No.	Name	Event	Date	Defenses
1	(South Africa) Dallas Jakobi def. Adam Speechly	EFC 10; Johannesburg, South Africa	1 September 2011	
2	(Brazil) Jadyson Costa	EFC 13; Johannesburg, South Africa	13 April 2012	
3	(South Africa) Michiel Opperman	EFC 16; Johannesburg, South Africa	19 October 2012	
4	(South Africa) Dino Bagattin	EFC 23; Johannesburg, South Africa	12 September 2013	
5	(Nigeria) Henry Fadipe	EFC 29; Johannesburg, South Africa	1 May 2014	
6	(South Africa) Adam Speechly	EFC 32; Johannesburg, South Africa	7 August 2014	
7	(South Africa) David Buirski	EFC 37; Boksburg, South Africa	21 February 2015	1. def. Martin van Staden at EFC 46 on 12 December 2015
Burisku vacated the title on 3 July 2014 when he moved up to Middleweight.
8	(South Africa) Dricus du Plessis def. Martin van Staden	EFC 50; Sun City, South Africa	17 June 2016	1. def. José Maurício da Rocha Jr. at EFC 59 on 13 May 2017
du Plessis vacated on 14 April 2018 after signing with KSW.
9	(Democratic Republic of the Congo) Gunter Kalunda Ngunza def. José Maurício da Rocha Jr.	EFC 73; Sun City, South Africa	7 September 2018	1. def. Martin van Staden at EFC 46 on 12 December 2015
Ngunza vacated on 25 April 2019 after signing with ONE.
10	(Zimbabwe) Themba Gorimbo def. Luke Michael	EFC 82; Brakpan, South Africa	28 September 2019	1. def. Lyle Karam at EFC 84 on 14 March 2020
Gorimbo vacated on 29 October 2021 after signing with the UAE Warriors.
11	(South Africa) Ziko Magengele def. Martin van Staden	EFC 93; Johannesburg, South Africa	9 April 2022	
12	(South Africa) Mark Hulme	EFC 102; Johannesburg, South Africa	13 April 2023	1. def. Peace Nguphane at EFC 110 on 7 December 2023
Hulme vacated the title after leaving EFC.
13	(South Africa) Zaakir Badat def. Jailson Sousa	EFC 113; Johannesburg, South Africa	9 May 2024	1. def. Luke Michael at EFC 120 on 12 December 2024; 2. def. Segun Ogunnoki at EFC 124 on 6 June 2025; 3. def. Ziko Makengele at EFC 133 on 7 May 2026

=== Lightweight World Championship ===
146 to 155 lbs (66 to 70 kg)

No.	Name	Event	Date	Defenses
1	(South Africa) Wentzel Nel def. Leo Gloss	EFC 3 Johannesburg, South Africa	8 May 2010	
2	(South Africa) Costa Ioannou	EFC 8 Johannesburg, South Africa	14 April 2011	1. def. Alex Cheboub at EFC 11 on 10 November 2011; 2. def. Adam Speechly at EFC 14 on 1 June 2012; 3. def. Leon Mynhardt at EFC 17 on 23 November 2012
3	(South Africa) Don Madge	EFC 20; Johannesburg, South Africa	27 June 2013	
3	(South Africa) Leon Mynhardt	EFC 25; Johannesburg, South Africa	7 November 2013	1. def. Frederich Naumann at EFC 27 on 27 February 2014; 2. def. Sibusiso Mdoko at EFC 34 on 2 October 2014; 3. def. Don Madge at EFC 37 on 21 February 2015; 4. def. Themba Gorimbo at EFC 44 on 3 October 2015
4	(United States) Dave Mazany	EFC 51; Johannesburg, South Africa	15 July 2016	1. def. Leon Mynhardt at EFC 55 on 11 November 2016
5	(South Africa) Don Madge (2)	EFC 58; Cape Town, South Africa	8 April 2017	
Madge vacated the title on 27 October 2018 after signing with the UFC.
6	(South Africa) Martin van Staden def. Gavin Hughes	EFC 68; Cape Town, South Africa	31 March 2018	
7	(United States) Dave Mazany (2)	EFC 72; Cape Town, South Africa	11 August 2018	
Mazany vacated the title on 17 October 2018 after he retired.
8	(England) Joe Cummins def. Martin van Staden	EFC 77; Pretoria, South Africa	16 March 2019	
-	(Democratic Republic of the Congo) Alain Ilunga def. Anicet Kanyeba for interim title	EFC 86; Johannesburg, South Africa	12 June 2021	
Ilunga vacated the interim title after signing with Absolute Championship Akhmat.
-	(Democratic Republic of the Congo) Tshilumba Mikixi def. Cole Henning for interim title	EFC 100; Johannesburg, South Africa	1 December 2022	
Cummins vacated the lineal title after leaving EFC, while Mikixi was stripped of the interim title on 7 December 2023 after withdrawing from a scheduled title bout against Kaleka Kabanda at EFC 110.
9	(Democratic Republic of the Congo) Igeu Kabesa def. Kaleka Kabanda	EFC 112; Johannesburg, South Africa	11 April 2024	1. def. Humphrey Mulenga at EFC 115 on 11 July 2024
10	(South Africa) Martin van Staden (2)	EFC 120; Johannesburg, South Africa	12 December 2024	
-	(South Africa) Adrian Sanchez def. Jeferson Pereira for interim title	EFC 131; Cape Town, South Africa	26 February 2026	1. def. Bradley Swanepoel at EFC 136 on 6 August 2026

=== Featherweight World Championship ===
136 to 145 lbs (61 to 66 kg)

No.	Name	Event	Date	Defenses
1	(Angola) Demarte Pena def. Leo Gloss	EFC 10; Johannesburg, South Africa	1 September 2011	1. def. Wesley Hawkey at EFC 14 on 1 June 2012; 2. def. Terrence Griessel at EFC 16 on 19 October 2012; 3. def. Wentzel Nel at EFC 19 on 19 April 2013; 4. def. Abdul Hassan at EFC 21 on 25 July 2013; 5. def. Alain Ilunga at EFC 24 on 10 October 2013
Pena vacated the title on 3 July 2014 when he moved down to Bantamweight.
2	(South Africa) Boyd Allen def. Barend Nienaber	EFC 32; Johannesburg, South Africa	7 August 2014	1. def. Wade Groth at EFC 36 on 11 December 2014; 2. def. Wesley Hawkey at EFC 38 on 4 April 2015
3	(Scotland) Danny Henry	EFC 44; Johannesburg, South Africa	3 October 2015	
4	(Democratic Republic of the Congo) Igeu Kabesa	EFC 47; Johannesburg, South Africa	5 March 2016	1. def. Hanru Botha at EFC 56 on 9 December 2016
5	(Scotland) Danny Henry (2)	EFC 57; Johannesburg, South Africa	4 March 2017	
Henry vacated the title on 16 July 2017 after signing with the UFC.
6	(Democratic Republic of the Congo) Igeu Kabesa (2) def. Pierre Botha	EFC 62; Johannesburg, South Africa	19 August 2017	1. def. Calum Murrie at EFC 74 on 6 October 2018; 2. def. Karlo Caput at EFC 79 on 4 May 2019
7	(Brazil) Reinaldo Ekson	EFC 86; Johannesburg, South Africa	12 June 2021	1. def. August Kayambala at EFC 91 on 4 December 2021
Ekson vacated the title after signing with PFL.
8	(Democratic Republic of the Congo) Igeu Kabesa (3) def. Nerik Simões	EFC 95; Johannesburg, South Africa	16 July 2022	1. def. Bradley Swanepoel at EFC 99 on 11 November 2022; 2. def. Vince Bembe at EFC 104 on 15 June 2023; 3. def. Reinaldo Ekson at EFC 110 on 7 December 2023
-	(South Africa) Roedie Roets def. Ayanda Zwane for interim title	EFC 118; Johannesburg, South Africa	10 October 2024	
-	(Zambia) Ken Sekeletu def. interim champion Roedie Roets	EFC 121; Johannesburg, South Africa	6 March 2025	
Sekeletu was stripped of the interim title on 9 October 2025 after failing to make weight for his title defense against Billy Oosthuizen at EFC 128.
-	(South Africa) Billy Oosthuizen def. Ken Sekeletu for interim title	EFC 128; Johannesburg, South Africa	9 October 2025	
Oosthuizen was stripped of the interim title on 10 September 2026 due to inactivity.
-	(South Africa) Faeez Jacobs def. Shadrack Yemba for interim title	EFC 137; Johannesburg, South Africa	10 September 2026	

=== Bantamweight World Championship ===
126 to 135 lbs (57 to 61 kg)

No.	Name	Event	Date	Defenses
1	(South Africa) Nkazimulo Zulu def. Charlie Weyer	EFC 27; Johannesburg, South Africa	27 February 2014	
2	(Angola) Demarte Pena	EFC 31; Johannesburg, South Africa	3 July 2014	1. def. Francois Groenewald at EFC 34 on 2 October 2014; 2. def. Cedric Doyle at EFC 41 on 11 July 2015; NC. vs. interim champion Irshaad Sayed at EFC 55 on 11 November 2016; NC. vs. interim champion Irshaad Sayed at EFC 66 on 16 December 2017
-	(South Africa) Irshaad Sayed def. Cedric Doyle for interim title	EFC 48; Cape Town, South Africa	22 April 2016	
Pena defended and unified the title at EFC 55, but his win was overturned to a no-contest due to a failed drug test. On 25 May 2017, this violation was ruled as unintentional and Pena was then allowed to remain as lineal champion. Subsequently, Sayed was then retroactively reinstated as interim champion.
Pena defended and unified the title at EFC 66, but was stripped of the title on 17 December 2017, after his win was overturned to a no-contest due to another failed drug test. Sayed was not promoted to undisputed champion, as he opted to vacate the interim title and retire.
3	(South Africa) JP Buys def. Philippe Rouch	EFC 69; Johannesburg, South Africa	28 April 2018	1. def. interim champion Luthando Biko at EFC 78 on 13 April 2019
-	(South Africa) Luthando Biko def. Cal Ellenor for interim title	EFC 75; Cape Town, South Africa	3 November 2018	
-	(South Africa) Faeez Jacobs def. Nkazimulo Zulu for interim title	EFC 81; Johannesburg, South Africa	10 August 2019	
Buys vacated the title on 17 November 2020 after signing with the UFC.
4	(South Africa) Faeez Jacobs promoted to undisputed champion	—	17 November 2020	
5	(Zimbabwe) Sylvester Chipfumbu	EFC 85; Johannesburg, South Africa	8 May 2021	
Chipfumbu vacated the title after signing with the UAE Warriors.
6	(South Africa) Cameron Saaiman def. Sindile Manengela	EFC 94; Johannesburg, South Africa	4 June 2022	
Saaiman vacated the title in March 2022 to compete on Dana White's Contender Series.
7	(Zimbabwe) Nicholas Hwende def. Nkazimulo Zulu	EFC 96; Johannesburg, South Africa	11 August 2022	1. def. Nkazimulo Zulu at EFC 100 on 1 December 2022; 2. def. Roevan de Beer at EFC 101 on 2 March 2023
Hwende vacated the title in June 2023 after signing with Brave CF.
8	(South Africa) Nkazimulo Zulu (2) def. Musa Sethwape	EFC 105; Johannesburg, South Africa	13 July 2023	
-	(South Africa) Terence Balelo def. Musa Sethwape for interim title	EFC 108; Johannesburg, South Africa	12 October 2023	
Zulu vacated the title to focus on defending the Flyweight title.
9	(South Africa) Terence Balelo promoted to undisputed champion	—	7 March 2024	
Balelo vacated the title on 22 May 2024 when he moved down to Flyweight.
10	(South Africa) Faeez Jacobs (2) def. Vince Bembe	EFC 117; Johannesburg, South Africa	12 September 2024	1. def. Sibusiso Sovendle at EFC 122 on 10 April 2025; 2. def. Trent Girdham at EFC 131 on 26 February 2026; 3. def. Gift Walker at EFC 135 on 2 July 2026

=== Flyweight World Championship ===
116 to 125 lbs (53 to 67 kg)

No.	Name	Event	Date	Defenses
1	(South Africa) Nkazimulo Zulu def. Craig Ninow	EFC 43; Durban, South Africa	27 August 2015	1. def. Sylvester Chipfumbu at EFC 62 on 19 August 2017; 2. def. Magno Alves at EFC 71 on 23 June 2018; 3. def. Gary Joshua at EFC 75 on 3 November 2018
Zulu vacated the title to compete in The Ultimate Fighter: Tournament of Champions.
2	(South Africa) JP Buys def. Baldwin Mdlalose	EFC 54; Sun City, South Africa	15 October 2016	
Buys vacated the title when he moved up to Bantamweight.
3	(England) Jake Hadley	EFC 78; Cape Town, South Africa	13 April 2019	
Hadley vacated the title after signing with Bellator MMA.
4	(South Africa) Nkazimulo Zulu (2) def. Luthando Biko	EFC 89; Johannesburg, South Africa	10 September 2021	
5	(South Africa) Luthando Biko	EFC 91; Johannesburg, South Africa	4 December 2021	1. def. Magno Alves at EFC 96 on 11 August 2022
Biko vacated the title after signing with Ares FC.
6	(South Africa) Gift Walker def. Terence Balelo	EFC 107; Johannesburg, South Africa	7 September 2023	
7	(South Africa) Nkazimulo Zulu (3)	EFC 111; Johannesburg, South Africa	7 March 2024	
-	(South Africa) Terence Balelo def. Liridon Ramani for interim title	EFC 114; Johannesburg, South Africa	6 June 2024	
Zulu vacated the title on 24 August 2024 after signing with Rizin.
9	(South Africa) Terence Balelo promoted to undisputed champion	—	24 August 2024	
10	(Mozambique) Edson Machavane	EFC 119; Johannesburg, South Africa	14 November 2024	
Machavane vacated the title after signing with ONE. The title was officially vacated on 3 April 2025.
11	(South Africa) Willie van Rooyen def. Kleberson Sousa	EFC 123; Johannesburg, South Africa	8 May 2025	1. def. Anatolie Gafin at EFC 126 on 7 August 2025
van Rooyen announced on 15 October 2025, that he was signing with ONE. The title was officially vacated on 10 November 2025.
12	(South Africa) Tumelo Manyamala def. Ntando Zondi	EFC 131; Cape Town, South Africa	26 February 2026	

== Women's championship history ==
=== Women's Bantamweight World Championship ===
126 to 135 lbs (57 to 61 kg)

No.	Name	Event	Date	Defenses
1	(Nigeria) Juliet Chukwu def. Dayne Van Wyk	EFC 119; Johannesburg, South Africa	14 November 2024	

=== Women's Flyweight World Championship ===
116 pounds (53 kg) to 125 pounds (57 kg)

No.	Name	Event	Date	Defenses
1	(South Africa) Amanda Lino def. Jaqauline Trosee	EFC 60; Durban, South Africa	10 June 2017	1. def. Rizlen Zouak at EFC 70 on 26 May 2018
2	(France) Manon Fiorot	EFC 83; Pretoria, South Africa	14 December 2019	
Fiorot vacated the title on 20 January 2021 after signing with the UFC.
3	(South Africa) Amanda Lino (2) def. Mariana Salles	EFC 123; Johannesburg, South Africa	8 May 2025	1. def. Juliet Chukwu at EFC 134 on 4 June 2026

=== Women's Strawweight World Championship ===
Under 115 pounds (52 kg)

No.	Name	Event	Date	Defenses
1	(Italy) Chiara Penco def. Danella Eliasov	EFC 67; Johannesburg, South Africa	10 March 2018	
2	(Poland) Karolina Wójcik	EFC 76; Pretoria, South Africa	8 December 2018	
Wójcik vacated the title on 8 June 2019 after signing with Venator FC.
3	(Romania) Alice Ardelean def. Jessica Mouneimne	EFC 101; Johannesburg, South Africa	2 March 2023	
Ardelean vacated the title after signing with the UFC.

== Tournament winners ==
=== EFC Flyweight Grand Prix ===
Four-man flyweight tournament for the vacant EFC Flyweight title.

Weight Division	Champion	Runner-up	Event	Date
Flyweight	(South Africa) Tumelo Manyamala	(South Africa) Ntando Zondi	EFC 131	26 February 2026

== Notable athletes and alumni ==
- Garreth McLellan: Former EFC Middleweight champion who was signed by the UFC in 2015. He competed in 5 UFC bouts from April 2015 until March 2017.
- Ruan Potts: Former 2 times EFC Heavyweight champion who was signed by the UFC in 2014 He competed in 3 UFC bouts from May 2014 until February 2015.
- Cyril Asker: Former EFC Heavyweight champion who was signed by the UFC in 2016. To date he has competed in 5 UFC bouts.
- Danny Henry: Former 2 times EFC Featherweight champion who was signed by the UFC in 2017. In his debut match at UFC Fight Night: Nelson vs. Ponzinibbio he earned a Fight of the night bonus. To date he has competed in 4 UFC bouts.
- Dalcha Lungiambula: Former EFC Heavyweight and Light Heavyweight champion who was invited to compete in the UFC in 2019. To date he has competed in 3 UFC bouts.
- Dricus du Plessis: Former UFC Middleweight champion, du Plessis is the former EFC Middleweight and Welterweight champion. Originally called up to the UFC in September 2020, he made his promotional debut against Markus Perez on 11 October 2020 at UFC Fight Night 179 and won via a TKO in the first round. Du Plessis was scheduled to face Trevin Giles on 20 March 2021 at UFC on ESPN 21, but had to withdraw from the event after being refused entry to the US due to Covid related restrictions placed on South Africans.
- Jared Vanderaa: Former EFC Heavyweight champion who was signed to the UFC in November 2020 after competing in the fourth season of Dana White's Contender Series. He was scheduled to fight Sergey Spivak at UFC 256 on 12 December 2020. However, Vanderaa tested positive to Covid 19 and was therefore removed from the event. The bout was rescheduled for UFC Fight Night: Blaydes vs. Lewis on 20 February 2021. Vanderaa lost via TKO in the 2nd round.
- Manon Fiorot Former EFC Women's Flyweight champion and winner of the EFC's second season of the reality program - The Fighter. She was signed to the UFC in December 2020 and made her debut against Victoria Leonardo at UFC Fight Night: Chiesa vs. Magny on 20 January 2021. Fiorot won via TKO in the second round.
- Themba Gorimbo Former EFC Welterweight champion. He was signed to the UFC and made his debut in February 2023 against A.J Fletcher at UFC Vegas 69 .

== Other EFC athletes signed to the UFC ==
- Don Madge. Former 2 times EFC Lightweight champion who was invited to compete in the UFC in 2018. In his debut match at UFC Fight Night 138 he earned a "Performance of the night" bonus with a knockout via a head kick. To date he has competed in 2 UFC bouts - UFC Fight Night 138 and UFC 242: Khabib vs. Poirier. Madge was scheduled to face Nasrat Haqparast at UFC Fight Night: Edwards vs. Muhammad on 13 March 2021 but had to withdraw from the event after being refused entry to the US due to Covid related restrictions placed on South Africans.
- JP Buys Former EFC Flyweight and Bantamweight champion who was invited to compete in UFC owner Dana White 's Tuesday Night Contender Series in August 2017 and again in the fourth season in November 2020. After beating his opponent in the final fight of the fourth season on 17 November 2020, Buys was signed to the UFC. He made his UFC debut against Bruno Gustavo da Silva at UFC on ESPN: Brunson vs. Holland on 20 March. 2021, losing by TKO. He was 0-4 in the promotion with losses from Montel Jackson, Cody Durden, and Marcus McGhee, before being released from the promotion in October 2023.
- Nkazimulo Zulu. Former two times EFC Flyweight champion and current EFC competitor who was invited in 2016 to compete in The Ultimate Fighter which was produced by the UFC and Fox Sports 1. Zulu competed on The Ultimate Fighter Season 24, Opening Round, Day 2.

== Reality shows ==
=== The Fighter: Season 1 ===
EFC launched a reality TV show on 14 October 2017 called The Fighter. Housed in a villa in Johannesburg, South Africa, 10 male MMA Middleweight prospects from around the world lived and trained together, as well as competed against one another for a multiple fight contract and a guaranteed EFC title fight. They were split into two teams each coached by an experienced EFC athlete. The Fighter was broadcast on global television in 10 one-hour episodes. It was concluded on 16 December 2017 at EFC 66 with The Fighter title bout taking place between the two finalists followed by a bout between the two coaches

Season	Date	Weight class	Winner	Runner-up	Source
The Fighter: Season 1	14 October 2017	Middleweight	Brendan Lesar	Ibrahima Mane	

=== The Fighter: Season 2 ===
Following the success and positive reception to The Fighter: Season 1, EFC launched The Fighter: Season 2 on 26 April 2019. It followed the same format as Season 1 but with 10 female MMA Flyweight athletes from around the world instead. They were housed in Rosebank, South Africa, where they trained together and competed against one another in a quest to win a multiple fight contract and a guaranteed EFC title fight. As with Season 1, the competitors were split into two teams each coached by an experienced EFC athlete. Season 2 was also broadcast on global television in 10 one-hour episodes. It was concluded on 29 June 2019 at EFC 80 with The Fighter Season 2 title bout taking place between the two finalists followed by a bout between the two coaches.

Season	Date	Weight class	Winner	Runner-up	Source
The Fighter: Season 2	26 April 2019	Flyweight	Manon Fiorot	Mellony Geugjes	

== Subsidiary companies ==
EFC owns the following companies:

- EFC Gym
- EFC Performance Institute
