= Ruan Potts =

South African mixed martial artist

- Born: 21 February 1978 (age 48); Cape Town, South Africa
- Other names: Fangzz
- Height: 6 ft 2 in (1.88 m)
- Weight: 251 lb (114 kg; 17 st 13 lb)
- Division: Light Heavyweight; Heavyweight
- Reach: 75 in (190 cm)
- Stance: Orthodox
- Fighting out of: Boksburg, South Africa
- Team: Mark Robinson MMA
- Rank: Black belt in Judo; Brown belt in Brazilian Jiu-Jitsu
- Years active: 2011–2018

Mixed martial arts record
- Total: 18
- Wins: 11
- By knockout: 5
- By submission: 6
- Losses: 7
- By knockout: 5
- By decision: 2

Other information
- Mixed martial arts record from Sherdog

Ruan Potts (born 24 August 1977) is a South African professional mixed martial artist who competed in the Heavyweight division. A professional competitor from 2011 to 2018, Potts formerly competed for the UFC.

== Mixed martial arts career ==
Potts made his professional debut in 2011, competing exclusively for regional promotions in his native South Africa, where he was also the Extreme Fighting Championship (EFC) Heavyweight Champion. He compiled a record of 8 – 1, finishing his opponents in all of his victories before signing with the UFC in February 2014.

=== Ultimate Fighting Championship ===
Potts made his promotional debut against Soa Palelei on 10 May 2014 at UFC Fight Night 40. Palelei won the fight via knockout in the first round.

Potts faced Anthony Hamilton on 30 August 2014 at UFC 177. Hamilton won the bout via TKO in the second round.

Potts faced Derrick Lewis on 28 February 2015 at UFC 184. He lost the fight via TKO in the second round. Potts was subsequently released from the UFC.

=== Return to EFC ===
Potts re-signed with Extreme Fighting Championship (EFC) after his release from the UFC and faced Cyril Asker. He lost via TKO (retirement) after the first round. He has fought a further five times in the EFC since then.

== Championships and accomplishments ==
- Extreme Fighting Championship
  - EFC Heavyweight Championship (Two times)
  - Two successful title defences

== Mixed martial arts record ==
Professional record breakdown
18 matches	11 wins	7 losses
By knockout	5	5
By submission	6	0
By decision	0	2

Res.	Record	Opponent	Method	Event	Date	Round	Time	Location	Notes
Loss	11–7	Jared Vanderaa	TKO (punches)	EFC 76	8 December 2018	3	3:24	Pretoria, South Africa	For the vacant EFC Heavyweight Championship.
Win	11–6	Karl Etherington	TKO (punches)	EFC 58	8 April 2017	1	2:33	Cape Town, South Africa	
Win	10–6	Brendon Groenewald	Submission (rear naked choke)	EFC 55	11 November 2016	2	4:21	Cape Town, South Africa	
Win	9–6	Vandam Mbuyi	Submission (armbar)	EFC 50	17 June 2016	1	4:06	Sun City, South Africa	Return to Heavyweight.
Loss	8–6	Tumelo Maphutha	Decision (unanimous)	EFC 45	7 November 2015	3	5:00	Cape Town, South Africa	Light Heavyweight debut.
Loss	8–5	Cyril Asker	TKO (retirement)	EFC 40	6 June 2015	1	5:00	Johannesburg, South Africa	
Loss	8–4	Derrick Lewis	TKO (punches)	UFC 184	28 February 2015	2	3:18	Los Angeles, California, United States	
Loss	8–3	Anthony Hamilton	TKO (body punches)	UFC 177	30 August 2014	2	4:17	Sacramento, California, United States	
Loss	8–2	Soa Palelei	KO (punches)	UFC Fight Night: Brown vs. Silva	10 May 2014	1	2:20	Cincinnati, Ohio, United States	
Win	8–1	Andrew Van Zyl	Technical Submission (armbar)	EFC Africa 26	12 December 2013	1	0:44	Gauteng, South Africa	Won the EFC Heavyweight Championship.
Win	7–1	Ricky Misholas	Submission (triangle choke)	EFC Africa 24	10 October 2013	1	N/A	Gauteng, South Africa	
Win	6–1	Mahmoud Hassan	Submission (ankle lock)	EFC Africa 21	25 July 2013	1	0:37	Gauteng, South Africa	
Loss	5–1	Andrew Van Zyl	Decision (unanimous)	EFC Africa 18	1 March 2013	5	5:00	Gauteng, South Africa	Lost the EFC Heavyweight Championship.
Win	5–0	Bernardo Mikixi	TKO (punches)	EFC Africa 16	19 October 2012	2	N/A	Gauteng, South Africa	Defended the EFC Heavyweight Championship.
Win	4–0	Andrew Van Zyl	Submission (guillotine choke)	EFC Africa 11	10 November 2011	1	3:50	Gauteng, South Africa	Defended the EFC Heavyweight Championship.
Win	3–0	Norman Wessels	TKO (punches)	EFC Africa 9	30 July 2011	3	4:21	Gauteng, South Africa	Won the inaugural EFC Heavyweight Championship.
Win	2–0	Baygon Obutobe	TKO (punches and elbows)	EFC Africa 8	14 April 2011	4	3:00	Gauteng, South Africa	
Win	1–0	Calven Robinson	TKO (knee and punches)	EFC Africa 7	3 February 2011	1	1:23	Gauteng, South Africa	

== See also ==
- List of current UFC fighters
- List of male mixed martial artists
