= Magnus Cedenblad =

Swedish mixed martial arts fighter

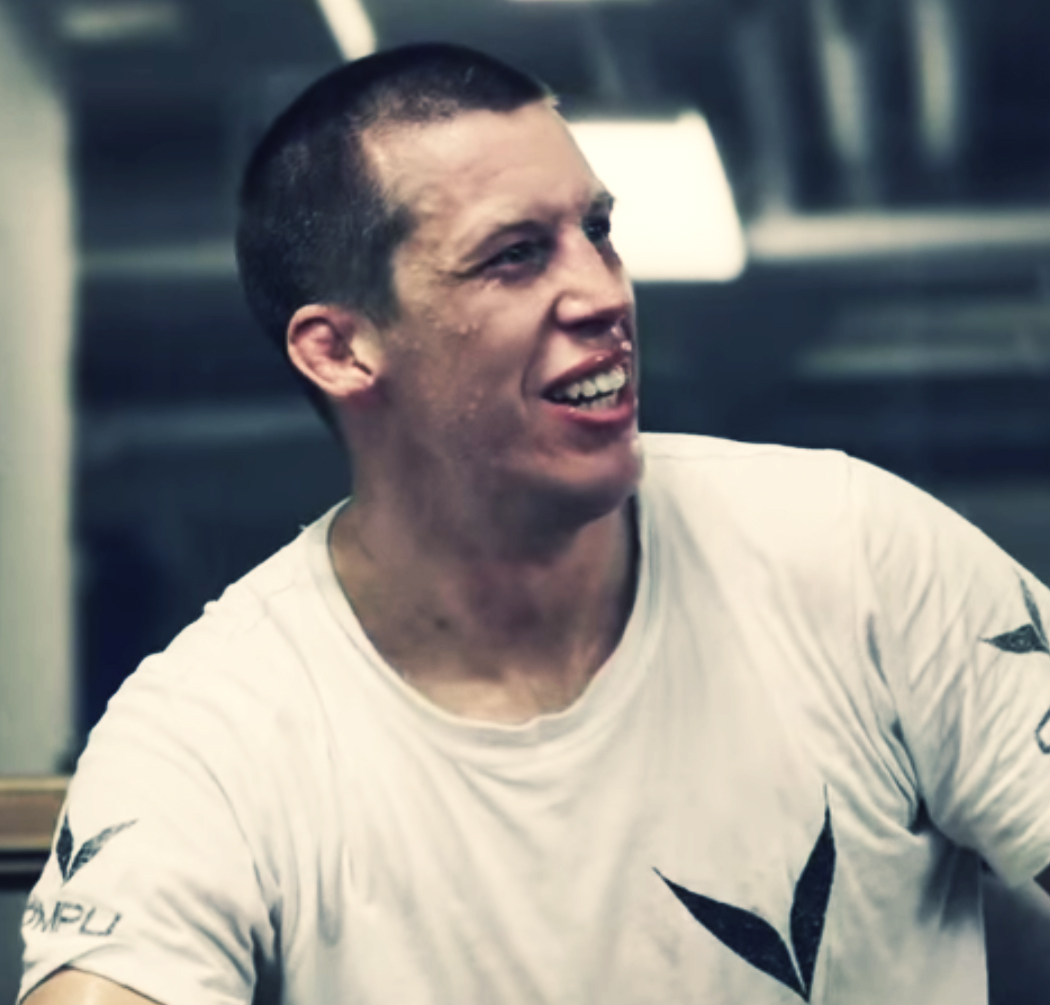
- Born: April 10, 1982 (age 44); Stockholm, Sweden
- Other names: Jycken
- Nationality: Swedish
- Height: 6 ft 3 in (1.91 m)
- Weight: 185 lb (84 kg; 13 st 3 lb)
- Division: Middleweight (2008-2018); Light Heavyweight (2007)
- Reach: 79 in (201 cm)
- Stance: Orthodox
- Fighting out of: Stockholm, Sweden
- Team: Pancrase Gym Sweden; Allstars Training Center; Alliance MMA; American Kickboxing Academy
- Years active: 2007-2018

Mixed martial arts record
- Total: 19
- Wins: 14
- By knockout: 7
- By submission: 5
- By decision: 2
- Losses: 5
- By knockout: 2
- By submission: 3

Amateur record
- Total: 2
- Wins: 2
- By knockout: 1
- By decision: 1

Other information
- Mixed martial arts record from Sherdog

Magnus Cedenblad (born April 10, 1982) is a retired Swedish mixed martial artist who competed in the middleweight division of the Ultimate Fighting Championship, among others.

== Mixed martial arts career ==
=== Early career ===
Cedenblad has said that he took up mixed martial arts because he wanted to learn to kick like Mirko "Cro Cop" Filipović and punch like Javier Garcia Roche.

He is a former European and Scandinavian Amateur champion in Shootfighting.

He started his MMA career on the European circuit in 2007. After losing his first two as a light heavyweight, he dropped down to middleweight and went 10–1 in his next 11 fights, with 6 wins by KO/TKO and 3 by submission, finishing 7 opponents in the first round.

=== Ultimate Fighting Championship ===
On January 5, 2012, it was announced that Cedenblad had signed with the UFC.

Cedenblad made his UFC debut against Francis Carmont on April 14, 2012, at UFC on Fuel TV: Gustafsson vs. Silva. After a good performance in the begin of the fight, winning the first round, he eventually lost via rear naked choke submission in the second round.

Cedenblad was expected to face Rafael Natal at UFC on Fox: Johnson vs. Dodson, but was forced out of the bout with an injury, and was replaced by Sean Spencer.

He was briefly linked to a bout against Robert McDaniel on August 28, 2013, at UFC Fight Night: Condit vs. Kampmann 2, but McDaniel's opponent was later changed to be Brad Tavares.

Instead, Cedenblad faced Jared Hamman on August 31, 2013, at UFC 164. He won the fight by submission due to a guillotine choke 57 seconds into the first round, giving him his first UFC win and serving Hamman the first submission loss of his career.

Cedenbald was expected to face Alessio Sakara on October 26, 2013, at UFC Fight Night 30, replacing an injured Tom Watson. However, Cedenblad himself later had to withdraw from the bout due to an injury, and was replaced by newcomer Nicholas Musoke, one of his main training partners.

Next he faced undefeated Krzysztof Jotko on May 31, 2014, at UFC Fight Night 41. After controlling the first round of action, he won the fight by submission due to a guillotine choke in the very last second of round two, serving Jotko the first loss of his career. He was also awarded his first Performance of the Night bonus for his efforts.

Cedenblad faced touted undefeated promotional newcomer Scott Askham on October 4, 2014, at UFC Fight Night 53. Despite getting caught and dropped by a front kick in round two, Cedenbland controlled the action through the rest of the fight, earning the unanimous decision victory.

Coming back from a one-and-a-half-year layoff due to injuries, Cedenblad faced Garreth McLellan on May 8, 2016, at UFC Fight Night 87. He scored a knockdown from a straight right hand in round 1 and won the fight by TKO early in round 2 after stunning McLellan with a head kick followed by a barrage of uppercuts against the fence.

Cedenblad returned to face Jack Marshman on November 19, 2016, at UFC Fight Night 99. He lost the back and forth fight via TKO in the second round.

Cedenblad was expected to face Chris Camozzi on May 28, 2017, at UFC Fight Night 109. However, Cedenblad was removed from the card on 27 March and replaced by Trevor Smith.

On August 14, 2018, it was announced that Cedenblad announced he retired from the sport due to numerous and continuous injuries.

== Personal life ==
Cedenblad has a degree in Physiotherapy.

== Championships and accomplishments ==
=== Mixed martial arts ===
- Ultimate Fighting Championship
  - Performance of the Night (One time) vs. Krzysztof Jotko
- Nordic MMA Awards - MMAviking.com
  - 2014 Fighter of the Year

=== Shootfighting ===
- European Shootfighting League
  - European Light Heavyweight Shootfighting Champion.
  - Scandinavian Light Heavyweight Shootfighting Champion.

== Mixed martial arts record ==
Professional record breakdown
19 matches	14 wins	5 losses
By knockout	7	2
By submission	5	3
By decision	2	0

Res.	Record	Opponent	Method	Event	Date	Round	Time	Location	Notes
Loss	14–5	Jack Marshman	TKO (punches)	UFC Fight Night: Mousasi vs. Hall 2	November 19, 2016	2	3:32	Belfast, Northern Ireland	
Win	14–4	Garreth McLellan	TKO (head kick and punches)	UFC Fight Night: Overeem vs. Arlovski	May 8, 2016	2	0:47	Rotterdam, Netherlands	
Win	13–4	Scott Askham	Decision (unanimous)	UFC Fight Night: Nelson vs. Story	October 4, 2014	3	5:00	Stockholm, Sweden	
Win	12–4	Krzysztof Jotko	Submission (guillotine choke)	UFC Fight Night: Munoz vs. Mousasi	May 31, 2014	2	4:59	Berlin, Germany	Performance of the Night.
Win	11–4	Jared Hamman	Technical Submission (guillotine choke)	UFC 164	August 31, 2013	1	0:57	Milwaukee, Wisconsin, United States	
Loss	10–4	Francis Carmont	Submission (rear-naked choke)	UFC on Fuel TV: Gustafsson vs. Silva	April 14, 2012	2	1:42	Stockholm, Sweden	
Win	10–3	Dan Edwards	Submission (kimura)	Fight for Chance 1	October 29, 2011	1	1:26	Oskarshamn, Sweden	
Win	9–3	Benas Mikalauskas	Submission (D'Arce choke)	Vision Fighting Championship 2	March 19, 2011	1	1:52	Karlstad, Sweden	
Win	8–3	Allan Love	Decision (unanimous)	Superior Challenge 6	October 29, 2010	3	5:00	Stockholm, Sweden	
Win	7–3	Valdas Pocevicius	TKO (punches)	Vision Fighting Championship 1	August 28, 2010	1	1:00	Karlstad, Sweden	
Win	6–3	Tomas Kuzela	TKO (punches)	Heroes Gate 1	May 29, 2010	2	4:04	Prague, Czech Republic	
Win	5–3	Patrick Kincl	TKO (punches)	Superior Challenge 5	May 1, 2010	2	2:32	Stockholm, Sweden	
Win	4–3	Jonas Hellqvist	TKO (punches)	Superior Challenge 4	October 31, 2009	1	3:37	Stockholm, Sweden	
Loss	3–3	Mats Nilsson	Submission (rear-naked choke)	The Zone FC 4 - Dynamite	April 25, 2009	1	3:49	Gothenburg, Sweden	
Win	3–2	Sergei Nikitin	Submission (rear-naked choke)	ProFC - Russia vs. Europe	March 29, 2009	1	4:15	Rostov-on-Don, Russia	
Win	2–2	Frank Vatan	TKO (knees)	Superior Challenge 2	October 25, 2008	1	0:51	Stockholm, Sweden	
Win	1–2	Danny Doherty	TKO (punches)	Superior Challenge 1	April 5, 2008	1	2:44	Stockholm, Sweden	Middleweight debut.
Loss	0–2	Juha Saarinen	Submission (armbar)	Carelia Fight 3	September 1, 2007	2	2:02	Lappeenranta, Finland	
Loss	0–1	Jevgeni Smirnov	KO (punches)	The Cage Vol. 7 - Reincarnation	April 20, 2007	1	0:33	Helsinki, Finland	

== Amateur mixed martial arts record ==
Professional record breakdown
2 matches	2 wins	0 losses
By knockout	1	0
By submission	0	0
By decision	1	0

Res.	Record	Opponent	Method	Event	Date	Round	Time	Location	Notes
Win	2–0	Hannes Åström	Decision (split)	Swedish Shootfighting League 07: Shoot Challenge 1	February 7, 2007	2	5:00	Stockholm, Sweden	
Win	1–0	Peter Sernling	KO (punches)	Lord of the Ring: Chapter II	November 25, 2006	1	0:34	Gävle, Sweden	

== See also ==
- List of current UFC fighters
- List of male mixed martial artists
