= Dalcha Lungiambula =

Congolese mixed martial arts fighter

- Born: July 31, 1987 (age 39); Kinshasa, Zaire
- Other names: Champion
- Height: 5 ft 8 in (1.73 m)
- Weight: 185 lb (84 kg; 13 st 3 lb)
- Division: Heavyweight; Light Heavyweight; Middleweight
- Reach: 76 in (193 cm)
- Style: Judo
- Fighting out of: Cape Town, South Africa
- Team: Camp Fight
- Years active: 2014–present

Mixed martial arts record
- Total: 17
- Wins: 11
- By knockout: 5
- By submission: 1
- By decision: 5
- Losses: 6
- By knockout: 3
- By submission: 2
- By decision: 1

Other information
- Mixed martial arts record from Sherdog

Dalcha Lungiambula (born July 31, 1987) is a Congolese mixed martial artist and kickboxer who competed in the Middleweight division of the Ultimate Fighting Championship.

== Mixed martial arts career ==
=== Early career ===
Lungiambula was born in Kinshasa, Zaire. When Lungiambula was eight-years-old, his father brought him his first judo uniform. Since that time, Lungiambula had practiced judo, eventually earning a black belt. He represented the Congolese National Judo Team from 2007 to 2009, before switching to MMA in 2010. Following the switch, he moved to Table View where he fought in the Extreme Fighting Championship (EFC). In August 2016, Lungiambula became a winner of the EFC light heavyweight title, and the same year competed at the World Jiu-Jitsu Championship and ADCC Submission Wrestling World Championship. In June 2018, he was a winner of the EFC heavyweight title. He signed a contract with the UFC in December 2018.

=== Ultimate Fighting Championship ===
After regional domination in South Africa, Lungiambula made his UFC debut June 29, 2019, at UFC on ESPN: Ngannou vs. dos Santos against Dequan Townsend. He won the fight via TKO in the 3rd round.

Lungiambula faced Magomed Ankalaev on November 9, 2019, at UFC on ESPN+ 21. He lost the fight via knockout in the third round.

Lungiambula was expected to face Karl Roberson on December 12, 2020, at UFC 256 However, Karl tested positive for COVID-19 and the fight was moved to the next card on December 19, UFC Fight Night: Thompson vs. Neal.

Lungiambula was expected to face UFC newcomer Isi Fitikefu at UFC on ESPN 20 on January 20, 2021 However, Fitikefu was removed due to an elbow injury and replaced by Markus Perez. He won the fight via unanimous decision.

Lungiambula faced Marc-André Barriault on September 4, 2021, at UFC Fight Night 191. He lost the fight via unanimous decision.

Lungiambula faced Cody Brundage on March 12, 2022, at UFC Fight Night 203. He lost the fight via guillotine choke submission in round one.

Lungiambula faced Punahele Soriano on July 16, 2022, at UFC on ABC 3. He lost the fight via knockout in the second round.

Lungiambula faced Edmen Shahbazyan on December 10, 2022, at UFC 282. He lost the fight via technical knockout in round two.

After the loss to Shahbazyan, Lungiambula was released from the UFC.

== Championships and accomplishments ==
=== Mixed martial arts ===
- Extreme Fighting Championship (EFC)
  - EFC Worldwide Light Heavyweight Championship
    - 2 successful title defenses
  - EFC Worldwide Heavyweight Championship (One time)

== Mixed martial arts record ==
Professional record breakdown
17 matches	11 wins	6 losses
By knockout	5	3
By submission	1	2
By decision	5	1

Res.	Record	Opponent	Method	Event	Date	Round	Time	Location	Notes
Loss	11–6	Edmen Shahbazyan	TKO (punches)	UFC 282	December 10, 2022	2	4:41	Las Vegas, Nevada, United States	
Loss	11–5	Punahele Soriano	KO (punches)	UFC on ABC: Ortega vs. Rodríguez	July 16, 2022	2	0:28	Elmont, New York, United States	
Loss	11–4	Cody Brundage	Submission (guillotine choke)	UFC Fight Night: Santos vs. Ankalaev	March 12, 2022	1	3:41	Las Vegas, Nevada, United States	
Loss	11–3	Marc-André Barriault	Decision (unanimous)	UFC Fight Night: Brunson vs. Till	September 4, 2021	3	5:00	Las Vegas, Nevada, United States	
Win	11–2	Markus Perez	Decision (unanimous)	UFC on ESPN: Chiesa vs. Magny	January 20, 2021	3	5:00	Abu Dhabi, United Arab Emirates	Middleweight debut.
Loss	10–2	Magomed Ankalaev	KO (front kick and punch)	UFC Fight Night: Magomedsharipov vs. Kattar	November 9, 2019	3	0:29	Moscow, Russia	
Win	10–1	Dequan Townsend	TKO (punches and elbows)	UFC on ESPN: Ngannou vs. dos Santos	June 29, 2019	3	0:42	Minneapolis, Minnesota, United States	Return to Light Heavyweight.
Win	9–1	Andrew van Zyl	Decision (split)	Extreme Fighting Championship 71	June 23, 2018	5	5:00	Johannesburg, South Africa	Heavyweight debut. Won the EFC Heavyweight Championship.
Win	8–1	Stuart Austin	TKO (punches)	Extreme Fighting Championship 65	November 4, 2017	2	1:48	Johannesburg, South Africa	Defended the EFC Light Heavyweight Championship.
Win	7–1	Alan Baudot	KO (punch)	Extreme Fighting Championship 61	July 8, 2017	1	0:26	North West Province, South Africa	Defended the EFC Light Heavyweight Championship.
Win	6–1	Tumelo Maphutha	Decision (unanimous)	Extreme Fighting Championship 52	August 5, 2016	5	5:00	Cape Town, South Africa	Won the interim EFC Light Heavyweight Championship. Later promoted to undisputed champion.
Win	5–1	Gideon Drotschie	TKO (submission to punches)	Extreme Fighting Championship 45	November 7, 2015	4	1:10	Cape Town, South Africa	
Loss	4–1	Norman Wessels	Submission (rear-naked choke)	Extreme Fighting Championship 42	August 8, 2015	2	1:45	Cape Town, South Africa	For the EFC Light Heavyweight Championship.
Win	4–0	Yannick Bahati	Decision (unanimous)	Extreme Fighting Championship 39	May 7, 2015	3	5:00	Cape Town, South Africa	Catchweight (194 lb) bout.
Win	3–0	Danie van Heerden	Decision (unanimous)	Extreme Fighting Championship 35	November 6, 2014	3	5:00	Cape Town, South Africa	
Win	2–0	Pete Motaung	Submission (armbar)	Extreme Fighting Championship 34	October 2, 2014	1	3:51	Johannesburg, South Africa	
Win	1–0	Roelof Scheepers	TKO (verbal submission)	Extreme Fighting Championship 30	June 5, 2014	1	0:59	Cape Town, South Africa	Light Heavyweight debut.

== See also ==
- List of male mixed martial artists
