= Irshaad Sayed =

South African martial artist (born 1989)

- Born: Irshaad Sayed; 30 March 1989 (age 37); Cape Town
- Other names: The White Tiger
- Nationality: South African
- Height: 1.73 m (5 ft 8 in)
- Weight: 62 kg (137 lb; 9.8 st)
- Division: Bantamweight (135lb)
- Style: Boxing, Kickboxing, Muay Thai

Kickboxing record
- Total: 24
- Wins: 24
- By knockout: 21

Mixed martial arts record
- Total: 16
- Wins: 12
- By knockout: 6
- By submission: 3
- By decision: 3
- Losses: 2
- By decision: 2
- No contests: 2

Other information
- Mixed martial arts record from Sherdog
- Last updated on: 4 April 2016

Irshaad "The White Tiger" Sayed (born 30 March 1989) is a South African national kickboxing champion, two time Muay Thai world champion and mixed martial arts champion who is currently signed with EFC Worldwide: Extreme Fighting Championship and is the Interim EFC Bantamweight Champion. He is a former 135 lbs Chinese National MMA Champion.

== Biography and career ==
Sayed was born in Cape Town and has two sisters and one brother. At school he loved sports participating in soccer, rugby and cricket before taking up kickboxing at the age of 15. He began competing in amateur competitions in South Africa running up a record of 9-0 but at the age of 17 he wanted to compete professionally and decided to move to Thailand to fight.

He won the WPMF Lightweight belt in Thailand in 2007 and returned home to win the South African National Kickboxing Championships the same year. In 2008, at the age of 18, he won the WMC I-1 Asia Championship title in Hong Kong and was invited to move there permanently to work at the Impakt MMA Academy.

In 2010 he won the WMC Lightweight title by defeating Australia's Phillip "Flip" Street at Planet Battle in Hong Kong.

== Mixed Martial Arts ==
Sayed has a professional MMA record of 11–2 with both his losses coming at the hands of top Chinese bantamweight Jumabieke Tuerxun. He made his MMA debut against Ngoo Ditty and stopped him by first-round KO at Fury 1 in Macau.

His second fight was against Jumabieke Tuerxun at Top of The Forbidden City Championship and he lost by unanimous decision. Sayed subsequently signed for Ranik Ultimate Fighting Federation (Ruff) and made his debut at Ruff 2 against Jumayi Ayideng, winning by split decision. he was then called up to replace the injured Ngoo Ditty to fight top Filipino bantamweight Jessie Rafols at ONE Fighting Championship: Battle of Heroes.

Sayed's aggressive approach paid off quickly when he downed Filipino Jessie Rafols with a short left uppercut 1:49 into the first stanza.

His next fight was a rematch with Jumabieke at Ruff 3 and this fight was even closer than the first with Sayed only losing by split decision. He went on to win his next two fights for Ruff submitting Ayideng in the first round of their rematch at Ruff 4 and beating Guobin Xue by TKO in the first round of their fight at Ruff 6.

On 2 February 2013 Sayed will fight Jumabieke Tuerxun for the third time for the opportunity to win the RUFF 135 lbs belt and be crowned the first ever Chinese National Bantamweight Champion. The fight is set for the Inner Mongolia Indoor Stadium.

On 29 January it was revealed that Jumabieke Tuerxun had withdrawn from the fight with several articles suggesting that he had refused to sign a new Ruff contract and was on the verge of signing with the UFC. Another Chinese fighter, Yuan Chun Bo, stepped in to replace him.

Sayed stopped Yuan Chun Bo by TKO (strikes) in the second round to become the first ever Ruff bantamweight champion and the first ever bantamweight champion of China. Sayed is a member of the fight team at Evolve MMA in Singapore.

Sayed is currently signed to EFC Worldwide: Extreme Fighting Championship, based in South Africa (formerly known as EFC Africa). He holds wins over Leo Gloss, Charlie Weyer, Abdul Hassan and Oumpie Sebeko. On 22 April 2016, Sayed fought Cedric Doyle for the interim EFC Bantamweight Championship in Cape Town at EFC 48, which was originally scheduled on 23 April. Sayed won via KO with a knee at the last second in round 3. On 11 November 2016, Irshaad fought Demarte Pena at EFC 55 for the Undisputed EFC Bantamweight Championship in a heated rivalry in Cape Town. He lost via unanimous decision. On 15 February 2017, Demarte Pena failed a doping test from SAIDS (South African Institute For Drug Free Sport). SAIDS overturned the result to a no contest and Sayed was reinstated the Inaugural EFC Bantamweight Champion.

On 20 September 2018, WADA have found Pena to be guilty of doping after EFC 66 and sentenced him to a four-year suspension, minus time already served. The second fight between himself and Sayed has been disqualified, and thus ruled a No Contest.

Sayed coached the first season of EFC's new reality television show, The Fighter, which is EFC's own version of UFC's The Ultimate Fighter and is opposing rival Demarte Pena.

== Titles ==
- Extreme Fighting Championship (EFC)
  - Interim EFC Bantamweight Champion
- Ranik Ultimate Fighting Federation (RUFF)
  - RUFF Bantamweight Champion / Chinese National Bantamweight Champion
- South African Kickboxing Association (SAKA)
  - SAKA South African Champion (Kickboxing)
- World Professional Muaythai Federation (WPMF)
  - WPMF Lightweight Champion (Muay Thai)
- World Muaythai Council (WMC)
  - WMC I-1 Asia Champion (Muay Thai)
  - WMC Lightweight Champion (Muay Thai)

== Mixed martial arts record ==
Professional record breakdown
16 matches	12 wins	2 losses
By knockout	6	0
By submission	3	0
By decision	3	2
No contests	2	

Res.	Record	Opponent	Method	Event	Date	Round	Time	Location	Notes
NC	12–2 (2)	Demarte Pena	NC (overturned)	EFC Worldwide 66	16 December 2017	4	4:23	Pretoria, South Africa	For the EFC Bantamweight Championship. Originally a KO/TKO (punches) loss; overturned to a no contest after Pena failed a drug test. Sayed was not reinstated as champion due to retirement.
Win	12–2 (1)	Tumisang Madiba	TKO (punches)	EFC World Wide 58	8 April 2017	2	1:33	Cape Town, South Africa	
NC	11–2 (1)	Demarte Pena	NC (overturned)	EFC Worldwide 55	11 November 2016	5	5:00	Cape Town, South Africa	For the EFC Bantamweight Championship. Originally a Decision (unanimous) loss; overturned to a no contest after Pena failed a drug test. Sayed was reinstated as the interim champion.
Win	11–2	Cedric Doyle	KO (knee)	EFC Worldwide 48	22 April 2016	3	4:59	Cape Town, South Africa	Won the interim EFC Bantamweight Championship.
Win	10–2	Oumpie Sebeko	Decision (unanimous)	EFC Worldwide 39	7 May 2015	3	5:00	Cape Town, South Africa	
Win	9–2	Abdul Hassan	Decision (unanimous)	EFC Worldwide 35	6 November 2014	3	5:00	Cape Town, South Africa	
Win	8–2	Charlie Weyer	Submission (rear-naked choke)	EFC Worldwide 30	5 June 2014	1	3:45	Cape Town, South Africa	
Win	7–2	Leo Gloss	Submission (rear-naked choke)	EFC Worldwide 28	27 March 2014	1	4:01	Johannesburg, South Africa	
Win	6–2	Chunbo Yuan	TKO (punches)	Ruff 8	2 February 2013	2	4:22	Hohhot, China	
Win	5–2	Guobin Xue	TKO (punches)	Ruff 6	3 November 2012	1	3:24	Hohhot, China	
Win	4–2	Jumayi Ayideng	Submission (rear-naked choke)	Ruff 4	3 December 2011	1	4:40	Hohhot, China	
Loss	3–2	Jumabieke Tuerxun	Decision (split)	Ruff 3	24 March 2012	3	5:00	Chongqing, China	
Win	3–1	Jessie Rafols	KO (punch to the body)	ONE FC: Battle of Heroes	11 February 2012	1	1:49	Jakarta, Indonesia	
Win	2–1	Jumayi Ayideng	Decision (split)	Ruff 2	17 December 2011	3	5:00	Chongqing, China	
Loss	1–1	Jumabieke Tuerxun	Decision (unanimous)	Top of the Forbidden City World Combat Championship	8 July 2011	3	5:00	Beijing, China	
Win	1–0	Ngoo Ditty	TKO	Fury 1: Clash of the Titans	21 May 2010	1	N/A	Cotai, Macau	
