= Jared Vanderaa =

American mixed martial artist

- Born: Jared Vanderaa; May 12, 1992 (age 34); Richland, Washington, U.S.
- Height: 6 ft 4 in (193 cm)
- Weight: 259 lb (117 kg; 18 st 7 lb)
- Division: Heavyweight
- Reach: 80 in (203 cm)
- Fighting out of: Hemet, California
- Team: PrimeTime MMA / Team Quest Hemet (2010–2022); Dan Henderson's Athletic Fitness Center (2015–2022); Kings MMA (2022–present)
- Rank: Black belt in Brazilian jiu-jitsu under Tom Gallicchio and Joe Stevenson
- Years active: 2015–present

Mixed martial arts record
- Total: 31
- Wins: 18
- By knockout: 8
- By submission: 7
- By decision: 3
- Losses: 13
- By knockout: 5
- By submission: 4
- By decision: 4

Other information
- Mixed martial arts record from Sherdog

Jared Vanderaa (born May 12, 1992) is an American mixed martial artist who competed in the Heavyweight division of the Ultimate Fighting Championship.

== Background ==
Vanderaa was born in Washington but moved around a lot with his mother in pursuit of opportunities, eventually settling in California. Vanderaa started training MMA in February 2010, right after wrestling season, and had his amateur first fight in October 2010. He started wrestling at 15, a sophomore in high school and then dislocated his shoulder right at the end of the season. He got it fixed and joined an MMA gym immediately after, beginning his MMA journey. He attended California Baptist University but dropped out after a couple of days.

== Mixed martial arts career ==
=== Early career ===
Vanderaa competed as an amateur from 2012 to 2015, in the heavyweight and light heavyweight divisions. He compiled a record of 5–4. In his professional debut, he submitted John Rizzo via rear-naked choke in the first round. Vanderaa defeated his next four foes all by stoppages. Vanderaa faced Richard Odoms at LFA 15 for the LFA Heavyweight Championship on June 30, 2017. He lost the bout via kimura in the 5th round.

After tapping out Idrees Wasi in first round at Global Knockout 10, he made his Extreme Fighting Championship debut in South Africa at EFC 66, losing the split decision to Andrew van Zyl for the EFC Heavyweight Championship.

After losing a short notice bout via unanimous decision to Vernon Lewis at LFA 35, Vanderaa defeated Elvis Moyo via TKO in the second round at EFC 73. Vanderaa then defeated UFC veteran Ruan Potts via TKO in round two at EFC 76, winning the EFC Heavyweight Championship. At EFC 77, Vanderaa defended the title, defeating Ricky Mischolas via TKO in the second round. At LFA 74, Vanderaa lost to Renan Ferreira via triangle choke submission in the second round. He rebounded, defeating Tony Lopez via unanimous decision at SMASH Global 9, winning the Smash Global Heavyweight Championship.

At Dana White's Contender Series 34, Vanderaa defeated Harry Hunsucker via TKO in the first round, securing him a contract from the UFC.

=== Ultimate Fighting Championship ===
Vanderaa was scheduled to face Serghei Spivac on December 12, 2020, at UFC 256 However, Vanderaa tested positive for COVID-19 during fight week and had to withdraw. The pair eventually met on February 20, 2021, at UFC Fight Night 185. Vanderaa lost the fight via technical knockout in round two.

Vanderaa faced Justin Tafa on May 22, 2021, at UFC Fight Night: Font vs. Garbrandt. He won the fight via unanimous decision. This bout earned him the Fight of the Night award.

Vanderaa faced Alexander Romanov on October 9, 2021, at UFC Fight Night: Dern vs. Rodriguez. He lost the fight via technical knockout in round two.

Vanderaa was scheduled to face Azamat Murzakanov, replacing Philipe Lins on December 4, 2021, at UFC on ESPN 31. However, shortly after the weigh-ins, officials announced that the bout had been canceled due to Vanderaa not being medically cleared.

Vanderaa faced Andrei Arlovski on February 12, 2022, at UFC 271. He lost the back-and-forth fight via split decision.

Vanderaa faced Aleksei Oleinik, replacing Ilir Latifi, on April 9, 2022, at UFC 273. He lost the fight via scarf hold submission in the first round.

Vanderaa faced Chase Sherman on July 9, 2022, at UFC on ESPN: dos Anjos vs. Fiziev. He lost the fight via knockout in round three.

As the last fight of his prevailing contract, Vanderaa faced Waldo Cortes-Acosta on October 29, 2022, at UFC Fight Night 213. He lost the fight via unanimous decision.

After five straight losses, Vanderaa was released by the UFC in December 2022.

=== Post-UFC career ===
As the first bout of his post-UFC tenure Vanderaa faced Nick Costello at Gladiator Challenge – Proving Ground on March 4, 2023. He won the bout via first-minute submission.

He then made his light heavyweight debut against Chuck Campbell at Lights Out Fighting 10 on August 26, 2023, losing via third-round knockout.

Vanderaa next faced the undefeated Kent Mafileo at Fierce FC 30 on February 10, 2024. He would win the bout via second round submission.

Vanderaa would then face Eric Iman at Fierce FC 32 on May 31, 2024. He would win the bout via first round submission.

Vanderaa would next face Alexey Kiser at LXF 17 on June 15, 2024. He would win the fight via first round technical knockout extending his win streak to three.

Vanderaa faced Jake Craig for the vacant Unified MMA Light Heavyweight championship on October 3, 2025 at Unified MMA 64. He lost the bout by TKO in the first round.

== Personal life ==
Vanderaa and his fiancée Lauren have two daughters, born in 2017 and 2021.

Vanderaa and his fiancée own the Team Quest gym in Hemet, which is the successor of PrimeTime MMA where Jared began his career.

== Championships and accomplishments ==
=== Mixed martial arts ===
- Fierce Fighting Championship
  - FFC Heavyweight Championship (One time, current)
- Ultimate Fighting Championship
  - Fight of the Night (One time) vs. Justin Tafa
  - Second longest losing streak in UFC Heavyweight division history (5) (behind Tai Tuivasa)
- SMASH Global
  - SG Heavyweight Championship (One time)
- Extreme Fighting Championship
  - EFC Heavyweight Championship (One time)
    - One successful title defence

== Mixed martial arts record ==
Professional record breakdown
31 matches	18 wins	13 losses
By knockout	8	5
By submission	7	4
By decision	3	4

Res.	Record	Opponent	Method	Event	Date	Round	Time	Location	Notes
Loss	18–13	Alexander Romanov	Submission (rear-naked choke)	Shogun Fights 32	March 28, 2026	1	1:30	Hanover, Maryland, United States	For the vacant Shogun Fights Heavyweight Championship.
Loss	18–12	Jake Craig	TKO (punches)	Unified MMA 64	October 3, 2025	1	4:10	Enoch, Alberta, Canada	For the vacant Unified MMA Light Heavyweight Championship.
Win	18–11	Jordan Currie	Submission (rear-naked choke)	Fierce FC 39	March 29, 2025	3	3:13	Idaho Falls, Idaho, United States	Defended the Fierce FC Heavyweight Championship.
Win	17–11	Demoreo Dennis	Decision (unanimous)	Z Promotions: Fight Night 20	August 23, 2024	3	5:00	Lethbridge, Alberta, Canada	
Win	16–11	Alexey Kiser	TKO (punches)	LXF 17	June 16, 2024	1	2:27	Pauma Valley, California, United States	
Win	15–11	Eric Iman	Submission (rear-naked choke)	Fierce FC 32	May 31, 2024	1	1:39	West Valley City, Utah, United States	Defended the Fierce FC Heavyweight Championship.
Win	14–11	Kent Mafileo	Submission (guillotine choke)	Fierce FC 30	February 10, 2024	2	3:46	West Valley City, Utah, United States	Won the Fierce FC Heavyweight Championship.
Loss	13–11	Chuck Campbell	KO (punch)	LXF 10	August 26, 2023	3	4:34	Pauma Valley, California, United States	Light Heavyweight bout.
Win	13–10	Nick Costello	Submission (rear-naked choke)	Gladiator Challenge: Proving Ground	March 4, 2023	1	0:46	Valley Center, California, United States	
Loss	12–10	Waldo Cortes-Acosta	Decision (unanimous)	UFC Fight Night: Kattar vs. Allen	October 29, 2022	3	5:00	Las Vegas, Nevada, United States	
Loss	12–9	Chase Sherman	TKO (punches)	UFC on ESPN: dos Anjos vs. Fiziev	July 9, 2022	3	3:10	Las Vegas, Nevada, United States	
Loss	12–8	Aleksei Oleinik	Submission (scarf hold)	UFC 273	April 9, 2022	1	3:39	Jacksonville, Florida, United States	
Loss	12–7	Andrei Arlovski	Decision (split)	UFC 271	February 12, 2022	3	5:00	Houston, Texas, United States	
Loss	12–6	Alexander Romanov	TKO (punches)	UFC Fight Night: Dern vs. Rodriguez	October 9, 2021	2	4:43	Las Vegas, Nevada, United States	
Win	12–5	Justin Tafa	Decision (unanimous)	UFC Fight Night: Font vs. Garbrandt	May 22, 2021	3	5:00	Las Vegas, Nevada, United States	Fight of the Night.
Loss	11–5	Serghei Spivac	TKO (punches)	UFC Fight Night: Blaydes vs. Lewis	February 20, 2021	2	4:32	Las Vegas, Nevada, United States	
Win	11–4	Harry Hunsucker	TKO (punches)	Dana White's Contender Series 34	November 4, 2020	1	3:34	Las Vegas, Nevada, United States	
Win	10–4	Tony Lopez	Decision (unanimous)	SMASH Global 9	December 19, 2019	5	5:00	Hollywood, California, United States	Won the SG Heavyweight Championship.
Loss	9–4	Renan Ferreira	Submission (triangle choke)	LFA 74	August 30, 2019	2	2:37	Riverside, California, United States	
Win	9–3	Ricky Misholas	TKO (punches)	EFC 77	March 16, 2019	2	1:49	Pretoria, South Africa	Defended the EFC Heavyweight Championship.
Win	8–3	Ruan Potts	TKO (punches)	EFC 76	December 8, 2018	3	3:24	Pretoria, South Africa	Won the interim EFC Heavyweight Championship. Later promoted to undisputed champion.
Win	7–3	Elvis Moyo	TKO (punches)	EFC 73	September 7, 2018	2	2:00	Sun City, South Africa	
Loss	6–3	Vernon Lewis	Decision (unanimous)	LFA 35	March 9, 2018	3	5:00	Houston, Texas, United States	
Loss	6–2	Andrew van Zyl	Decision (split)	EFC 66	December 16, 2017	5	5:00	Pretoria, South Africa	For the EFC Heavyweight Championship.
Win	6–1	Idrees Wasi	Submission (straight ankle lock)	GKO 10	August 5, 2017	1	1:35	Jackson, California, United States	
Loss	5–1	Richard Odoms	Submission (kimura)	LFA 15	June 30, 2017	5	2:45	Shawnee, Oklahoma, United States	For the inaugural LFA Heavyweight Championship.
Win	5–0	Sean Johnson	Submission (guillotine choke)	SMASH Global 4	September 15, 2016	1	2:28	Los Angeles, California, United States	
Win	4–0	Mychal Clark	TKO (punches)	BAMMA Badbeat 20	June 10, 2016	1	0:20	Commerce, California, United States	
Win	3–0	Joe Hernandez	KO (punch)	SMASH Global 3	March 24, 2016	2	1:13	Los Angeles, California, United States	
Win	2–0	Daylin Murray	TKO (punches)	The Main Event 2	November 13, 2015	1	4:11	San Diego, California, United States	Heavyweight debut.
Win	1–0	John Rizzo	Submission (rear-naked choke)	KOTC: Sanctioned	June 14, 2015	1	0:29	San Jacinto, California, United States	Catchweight (230 lb) bout.

== See also ==
- List of male mixed martial artists
