= Ruff, Virginia =

Community in Mathews County, Virginia, US

Coordinates: 37°24′36″N 76°18′45″W

Ruff is an unincorporated community in Mathews County, in the U. S. state of Virginia.
