= Ruff (surname) =

Ruff is a surname. Notable people with the surname include:

- Alex Ruff (born 1974), Canadian politician
- Bálint Ruff, Hungarian politician
- Charles Ruff (1939–2000), American lawyer
- Guy Ruff (born 1960), American football player
- Howard Ruff, American financial adviser
- Jason Ruff (born 1970), Canadian hockey player
- Leon Ruff (born 1996), American professional wrestler
- Lindy Ruff (born 1960), Canadian hockey coach
- Matt Ruff (born 1965), American author
- Michelle Ruff (born 1967), American voice actress
- Otto Ruff (1871–1939), German chemist
- Thomas Ruff (born 1958), German photographer
- Willie Ruff (1931–2023), American hornist and bassist
