= Ranik Ultimate Fighting Federation =

MMA promoter based in Shanghai, China

- Company type: Private
- Industry: Mixed martial arts promotion
- Founded: 2007
- Headquarters: Shanghai, China
- Key people: Joel Resnick, CEO
- Website: http://www.ruffchina.com/us

Ranik Ultimate Fighting Federation (RUFF) is the first Chinese mixed martial arts (MMA) organization sanctioned by the General Administration of Sport of China. The winners of the title fights will be crowned as the national MMA champions of China in their respective weight classes. RUFF held its first event in August 2011 in Shanghai, before presenting in Chongqing, Hohhot, Nanjing, and Sanya. In February 2013 RUFF awarded Championship belts in five weight classes, at their Superfight event. Together with the Championship belt, each winner was awarded 1,000,000 RMB. RUFF along with Mandt Bros. Productions produced and aired a 10 episode reality series RUFF: Journey leading up to the Superfight. A new episode will air each week and will be nationally televised across China with TV viewership of over 30 million, over 10 episodes.

== Background ==
Founded in 2007 by businessmen Joel Resnick. From the outset, fighter safety was of paramount importance to RUFF. The company brought in well-known and C.O.M.M.A.N.D-certified referee, Jerin Valel to officiate at all events and to train local referees and judges from RUFF 1-8; and has continued its dedication to safety and fairness through training of referees and judges with the world's #1 referee Herb Dean. On December 6, 2010, RUFF announced its partnership with China's Wushu Association of the General Administration of Sport, allowing them to award National Champions. RUFF is the first organization with the ability to award the title of National Champion in MMA. Gaining credibility through their partnership with the government, RUFF was able to sign exclusive contracts with many of China's best fighters.

In August 2011, RUFF Genesis was held in Shanghai. RUFF announced its partnership with the L.A. based Mandt Bros. Productions Company in January, 2012.

== Current Operations ==
On September 8, 2012, RUFF made headlines when RUFF 5 was aired LIVE on Chinese TV. The event also played online on PPTV and QQ/Tencent and garnered an audience of over 1.3 million viewers. It was also the first time a combat event was televised live in China. RUFF 4 was re-broadcast in the days before RUFF 5 and gained a total viewership of 4.25 million. Having recently signed deals with satellite and regional broadcasters, RUFF's #s continue to grow reaching 8 million viewer for RUFF 7 and livestream #s hitting 2 million views; with a total potential audience of well over 1.3 billion.

RUFF has also been featured on the internet programs such as MMA Inside the Cage, MMA H.E.A.T and MMAMADHouse.

== Weight Divisions ==
▪ Flyweight: 55 kg

▪ Bantamweight: 60 kg

▪ Featherweight: 65 kg

▪ Lightweight: 70 kg

▪ Light Heavyweight: 93 kg

== 2013 Champions ==
Division	Weight limit	Champion	Since	Title Defenses
Flyweight	55 kg (121.3 lb; 8.7 st)	(China) Zhang Meixuan	February 2, 2013	0
Bantamweight	60 kg (132.3 lb; 9.4 st)	(South Africa) Irshaad Sayed	February 2, 2013	0
Featherweight	65 kg (143.3 lb; 10.2 st)	(China) Wang Guan	February 2, 2013	0
Lightweight	70 kg (154.3 lb; 11.0 st)	(Brazil) Rodrigo Caporal	February 2, 2013	0
Light Heavyweight	93 kg (205.0 lb; 14.6 st)	(China) Zhao ZiLong	February 2, 2013	0

== List of Events ==
#	RUFF Event	Date	Venue	City
1	RUFF: Genesis	August 27, 2011	Qizhong Forest Sports City Arena	Shanghai, China
2	RUFF 2	December 17, 2011	Jiangnan Sports Center	Chongqing, China
3	RUFF 3	March 24, 2012	Chongqing Indoor Stadium	Chongqing, China
4	RUFF 4	June 30, 2012	Hohhot People's Stadium	Hohhot, China
5	RUFF 5	September 8, 2012	Hohhot People's Stadium	Hohhot, China
6	RUFF 6	November 3, 2012	Hohhot People's Stadium	Hohhot, China
7	RUFF 7	December 22, 2012	Zifeng Tower	Nanjing, China
8	RUFF: Super Fight	February 2, 2013	Hohhot People's Stadium	Hohhot, China
9	RUFF 9	May 18, 2013	MGM Grand Sanya	Sanya, China
10	RUFF 10	August 24, 2013	Hongkou Indoor Stadium	Shanghai, China
11	RUFF 11	November 30, 2013	Hongkou Indoor Stadium	Shanghai, China
12	RUFF 12	March 29, 2014	Hongkou Indoor Stadium	Shanghai, China
13	RUFF Fu	June 7, 2014	Hongkou Indoor Stadium	Shanghai, China
