= Sultan Aliev =

Retired Russian mixed martial arts fighter

Sultan Aliev Султан Алиев
- Born: Sultan Magomedbegovich Aliev; September 17, 1984 (age 42); Kaspiysk, Dagestan ASSR, Russian SFSR, Soviet Union
- Native name: Sultan Gӏaliyev; Султан Гӏалиев
- Nationality: Russian
- Height: 1.80 m (5 ft 11 in)
- Weight: 170 lb (77 kg; 12 st)
- Division: Light Heavyweight; Middleweight; Welterweight
- Style: Combat Sambo
- Fighting out of: Derbent, Dagestan, Russia; Coconut Creek, Florida, United States
- Team: Champion Derbent; American Top Team; Eagles MMA
- Trainer: Greg Jackson (MMA), Abdulmanap Nurmagomedov (Sambo/MMA)
- Rank: International master of sport in Combat Sambo
- Wrestling: Master of sports in Freestyle Wrestling
- Years active: 2011–2019

Mixed martial arts record
- Total: 18
- Wins: 15
- By knockout: 10
- By decision: 5
- Losses: 3
- By knockout: 2
- By decision: 1

Other information
- Mixed martial arts record from Sherdog

Sultan Aliev
Medal record

Representing Russia

Men's Combat Sambo

World Championships
Gold medal – first place	2020 Novi Sad	90 kg
Gold medal – first place	2014 Narita	90 kg

Sultan Magomedbegovich Aliev (born September 17, 1984) is a Russian former professional mixed martial artist and active sambist. A professional from 2011 until 2019, he competed for the UFC and Bellator.

== Background ==
Sultan Aliev was born in Kaspiysk, Dagestan, Soviet Union. He is a Russian of Avar descent and a devout Sunni Muslim. He started in Combat Sambo at 23 years old, in 2009 he won Combat Sambo European Championship in Milan, Italy. In 2010 he received the rank "International Master of Sports in Combat Sambo" After Russian Combat Sambo Nationals 2011 (3rd) and 2012 (2nd), he made his professional MMA debut in ProFC and won his first professional fight against Sergey Guzev.

=== Sambo career ===
On February 5, 2012, Aliev lost to Vyacheslav Vasilevsky in Combat Sambo Russia Championship 2012 Finale (-90 kg) via decision (1–5).

On February 24, 2014, Aliev won against Vasilevsky in Combat Sambo Russia Championship 2014 Finale (-90 kg) via TKO.

On 24 November 2014 Aliev became World Combat Sambo Champion (-90 kg). In the finale match he defeated French Sebastian Libebe via TKO.

In Russian Nationals 2016 he lost to Khadis Ibragimov by knockout in the semifinal.

== Mixed martial arts career ==
=== ProFC ===
Aliev started his MMA career in ProFC in April 2011. He defeated Sergey Guzev on April 9, 2011, at ProFC 14 via unanimous decision.

Aliev defeated Armenian MMA prospect Hracho Darpinyan on July 2, 2011, at ProFC: Union Nation Cup Final via unanimous decision.

Aliev defeated Fuad Gadyrov on September 26, 2011, at ProFC: Grand Prix Global. He won via KO in the second round.

Aliev defeated taekwondo black belt Marcin Elsner on December 10, 2011, at ProFC: Grand Prix Global Finals. He won via TKO in the first round.

=== Bellator MMA ===
In 2013, Aliev was announced as one of the participants of the Bellator Season 8 Middleweight tournament.

Aliev debuted on February 14, 2013, at Bellator 89 where he faced Mikkel Parlo in the quarterfinal round. Aliev won the fight via unanimous decision to advance to the semifinals.

In the semifinals, Aliev faced Doug Marshall on March 7, 2013, at Bellator 92. Despite controlling the fight via his wrestling, Aliev lost via split decision, resulting in his first professional MMA loss.

=== Ultimate Fighting Championship ===
On May 7, 2014, it was announced that Aliev had signed a contract with the UFC.

Aliev made his promotional debut against Kenny Robertson in a welterweight bout on January 24, 2015, at UFC on Fox 14. He lost the fight via knockout in the first round.

Aliev was expected to face Hyun Gyu Lim on August 20, 2016, at UFC 202. However, Aliev pulled out of the fight in early August citing a wrist injury and was replaced by promotional newcomer Mike Perry.

Aliev faced Bojan Veličković on December 17, 2016, at UFC on Fox 22. He won the fight via split decision.

Aliev was expected to face Nordine Taleb on 16 December 2017 at UFC on FOX 26. However, Aliev was removed from the card in early December due to alleged visa issues restricting his ability to travel and was replaced by Danny Roberts.

Aliev faced Warlley Alves on May 12, 2018, at UFC 224. He lost the fight via TKO due to a doctor stoppage at the end of the second round.

Aliev was expected to face Lyman Good on November 3, 2018, at UFC 230. However, it was reported on October 19, 2018, that Aliev pulled out from the event citing injury and he was replaced by Ben Saunders.

Aliev was expected to face Emil Weber Meek on April 20, 2019, at UFC Fight Night 149. However, on March 3, 2019, it was announced that Meek withdrew from the bout due to undisclosed reasons and was replaced by Keita Nakamura. Aliev won the fight via unanimous decision. Following the bout, Aliev announced his retirement from mixed martial arts competition.

== Championships and accomplishments ==
=== Sambo ===
- Federation Internationale de Sambo (FIAS)
  - World Combat Sambo Championships (2014, Chiba)
- World Combat Sambo Federation
  - European Combat Sambo Championships (2012, Moscow)
- All-Russian Sambo Federation
  - Russian Combat Sambo National Championships 3rd (2010, 2011)
  - Russian Combat Sambo National Championships runner-up (2012)
  - Russian Combat Sambo National Champion (2014, World team-trials)
- Fight Matrix
  - 2011 Male Rookie of the Year

== Mixed martial arts record ==
Professional record breakdown
18 matches	15 wins	3 losses
By knockout	10	2
By decision	5	1

Res.	Record	Opponent	Method	Event	Date	Round	Time	Location	Notes
Win	15–3	Keita Nakamura	Decision (unanimous)	UFC Fight Night: Overeem vs. Oleinik	April 20, 2019	3	5:00	Saint Petersburg, Russia	
Loss	14–3	Warlley Alves	TKO (doctor stoppage)	UFC 224	May 12, 2018	2	5:00	Rio de Janeiro, Brazil	
Win	14–2	Bojan Veličković	Decision (split)	UFC on Fox: VanZant vs. Waterson	December 17, 2016	3	5:00	Sacramento, California, United States	
Loss	13–2	Kenny Robertson	KO (punches)	UFC on Fox: Gustafsson vs. Johnson	January 24, 2015	1	2:42	Stockholm, Sweden	Welterweight debut.
Win	13–1	Charles Andrade	TKO (punches)	MMA Star in the Ring: Shamil vs Renat	March 1, 2014	2	1:56	Makhachkala, Russia	
Win	12–1	Ruslan Khaskhanov	TKO (punches)	Fight Nights: Battle on Terek	October 4, 2013	1	2:28	Grozny, Russia	
Win	11–1	Kleber Bagunça	KO (punch)	World Ultimate Full Contact 2013	August 24, 2013	1	0:28	Lamego, Portugal	
Win	10–1	Viktor Kiyko	TKO (punches)	World Ultimate Full Contact 2013	August 24, 2013	1	2:22	Lamego, Portugal	
Loss	9–1	Doug Marshall	Decision (split)	Bellator 92	March 7, 2013	3	5:00	Temecula, California, United States	Bellator Season Eight Middleweight Tournament Semifinal.
Win	9–0	Mikkel Parlo	Decision (unanimous)	Bellator 89	February 14, 2013	3	5:00	Charlotte, North Carolina, United States	Middleweight debut; Bellator Season Eight Middleweight Tournament Quarterfinal.
Win	8–0	Arunas Vilius	TKO (punches)	New FC: Battle of the Stars	December 22, 2012	1	N/A	Makhachkala, Russia	
Win	7–0	Alexei Varagushin	TKO (punches)	WH: Igor Vovchanchyn Cup	November 9, 2012	1	N/A	Kharkiv, Ukraine	
Win	6–0	Vladimir Fedin	TKO (punches)	WH: Igor Vovchanchyn Cup	November 9, 2012	1	N/A	Kharkiv, Ukraine	
Win	5–0	Luis Henrique	TKO (punches)	Revolution FC 1: Beirut	March 9, 2012	2	2:30	Beirut, Lebanon	
Win	4–0	Marcin Elsner	TKO (punches)	ProFC: Grand Prix Global Finals	December 10, 2011	1	1:53	Rostov-on-Don, Russia	Won the ProFC Light Heavyweight Grand Prix.
Win	3–0	Fuad Gadyrov	KO (punch)	ProFC Grand Prix Global: Caucasus	September 26, 2011	2	3:24	Derbent, Russia	
Win	2–0	Hracho Darpinyan	Decision (unanimous)	ProFC: Union Nation Cup Final	July 2, 2011	3	5:00	Rostov-on-Don, Russia	
Win	1–0	Sergey Guzev	Decision (unanimous)	ProFC: Union Nation Cup 14	April 9, 2011	2	5:00	Rostov-on-Don, Russia	

== See also ==
- List of current UFC fighters
- List of male mixed martial artists
