= Joe Pyfer =

American mixed martial artist (born 1996)

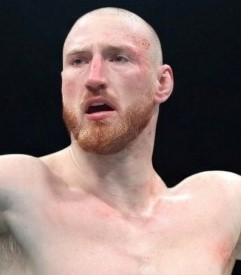
- Born: Joseph Oliver Pyfer; September 17, 1996 (age 30); Vineland, New Jersey, U.S.
- Other names: Bodybagz
- Height: 6 ft 1 in (185 cm)
- Weight: 185 lb (84 kg; 13 st 3 lb)
- Division: Middleweight
- Reach: 75 in (191 cm)
- Fighting out of: Philadelphia, Pennsylvania, U.S.
- Team: Marquez MMA/Webb Fitness & MMA
- Years active: 2018–present

Mixed martial arts record
- Total: 19
- Wins: 16
- By knockout: 10
- By submission: 4
- By decision: 2
- Losses: 3
- By knockout: 1
- By submission: 1
- By decision: 1

Other information
- Mixed martial arts record from Sherdog

Joseph Oliver Pyfer (born September 17, 1996) is an American professional mixed martial artist who competes in the Middleweight division of the Ultimate Fighting Championship (UFC). As of November 14, 2026, he is #6 in the Meta UFC middleweight rankings.

== Background ==
Raised in Pittsgrove Township, New Jersey, Pyfer attended Arthur P. Schalick High School and started competing on the school's wrestling team in tenth grade, where he was able to apply jiu jitsu and judo skills he learned as a child.

== Mixed martial arts career ==
=== Early career ===
Pyfer made his professional MMA debut in his home town of Philadelphia in May 2018. He won his debut and competed seven more times and went 7–1, winning the AOWCF and ROC Middleweight Championship along the way. Eight fights into his MMA career, Pyfer would have his first bout in the Dana White's Contender Series.

=== Dana White's Contender Series ===
Pyfer faced Dustin Stoltzfus at Dana White's Contender Series 28 on August 11, 2020. He lost the fight via technical knockout due to an injury stemming from a slam.

Pyfer faced Ozzy Diaz at Dana White's Contender Series 47 on July 26, 2022. He won the bout via technical knockout and was awarded a contract with the UFC.

=== Ultimate Fighting Championship ===
Making his UFC debut, Pyfer faced Alen Amedovski on September 17, 2022, at UFC Fight Night 210. He won the fight via technical knockout in round one. This fight earned him his first Performance of the Night award.

Pyfer faced Gerald Meerschaert on April 8, 2023, at UFC 287. He won the bout via TKO in the first round.

Pyfer faced Abdul Razak Alhassan on October 7, 2023, at UFC Fight Night 229. He won the fight via technical submission in the second round after rendering Alhassan unconscious with an arm-triangle choke. This fight earned him his second Performance of the Night award.

Pyfer faced Jack Hermansson on February 10, 2024, at UFC Fight Night 236. He lost the fight via unanimous decision.

Pyfer faced Marc-André Barriault on June 29, 2024 at UFC 303. He won the fight by knockout in the first round. This fight earned him another Performance of the Night award.

Pyfer was scheduled to face Kelvin Gastelum on March 29, 2025 at UFC on ESPN 64. However, despite both men weighing in for the bout, the match was cancelled the day of the event due to an illness sustained by Pyfer. The bout was rescheduled and took place on June 7, 2025 at UFC 316. After landing two knockdowns, Pyfer won the fight by unanimous decision.

Pyfer faced Abusupiyan Magomedov on October 4, 2025 at UFC 320. He won the fight via a face crank submission in the second round. This fight earned him another Performance of the Night award.

Pyfer faced former two-time UFC Middleweight Champion Israel Adesanya in the main event on March 28, 2026 at UFC Fight Night 271. He won the fight via technical knockout in the second round. This fight earned him a $100,000 Performance of the Night award.

Pyfer was targeted to face Caio Borralho on August 15, 2026 at UFC 330 but Borralho's rib injury prevented the fight from taking place.

Pyfer was scheduled to face Bo Nickal on December 12, 2026 at UFC 335. However, the bout was rescheduled to headline UFC Fight Night 299 on February 13, 2027 in Cleveland.

== Professional grappling career ==
Pyfer faced Gerald Meerschaert in the main event of Fury Pro Grappling 7 on May 27, 2023. He won the match by unanimous decision.

Pyfer faced Nick Willey at Fury Pro Grappling 12 on December 28, 2024. He won the match by golden score in overtime.

== Freestyle wrestling ==
Pyfer faced former UFC Middleweight Champion Luke Rockhold on September 19, 2026 at RAF 13. He won the bout by technical fall in the second round.

== Championships and accomplishments ==
=== Mixed martial arts ===
- Ultimate Fighting Championship
  - Performance of the Night (Five times) vs. Alen Amedovski, Abdul Razak Alhassan, Marc-André Barriault, Abusupiyan Magomedov and Israel Adesanya
  - UFC Honors Awards
    - 2022: Fan's Choice Debut of the Year Nominee vs. Alen Amedovski
    - 2025: President's Choice Performance of the Year Nominee vs. Abusupiyan Magomedov
- Art of War Cage Fighting
  - AOWCF Middleweight Championship (One time)
- Ring of Combat
  - ROC Middleweight Championship (One time)

== Mixed martial arts record ==
Professional record breakdown
| 19 matches | 16 wins | 3 losses |
| By knockout | 10 | 1 |
| By submission | 4 | 1 |
| By decision | 2 | 1 |

| Res. | Record | Opponent | Method | Event | Date | Round | Time | Location | Notes |
|---|---|---|---|---|---|---|---|---|---|
| Win | 16–3 | Israel Adesanya | TKO (punches) | UFC Fight Night: Adesanya vs. Pyfer | March 28, 2026 | 2 | 4:18 | Seattle, Washington, United States | Performance of the Night. |
| Win | 15–3 | Abusupiyan Magomedov | Submission (face crank) | UFC 320 | October 4, 2025 | 2 | 1:46 | Las Vegas, Nevada, United States | Performance of the Night. |
| Win | 14–3 | Kelvin Gastelum | Decision (unanimous) | UFC 316 | June 7, 2025 | 3 | 5:00 | Newark, New Jersey, United States | |
| Win | 13–3 | Marc-André Barriault | KO (punches) | UFC 303 | June 29, 2024 | 1 | 1:25 | Las Vegas, Nevada, United States | Performance of the Night. |
| Loss | 12–3 | Jack Hermansson | Decision (unanimous) | UFC Fight Night: Hermansson vs. Pyfer | February 10, 2024 | 5 | 5:00 | Las Vegas, Nevada, United States | |
| Win | 12–2 | Abdul Razak Alhassan | Technical Submission (arm-triangle choke) | UFC Fight Night: Dawson vs. Green | October 7, 2023 | 2 | 2:05 | Las Vegas, Nevada, United States | Performance of the Night. |
| Win | 11–2 | Gerald Meerschaert | TKO (punches) | UFC 287 | April 8, 2023 | 1 | 3:15 | Miami, Florida, United States | |
| Win | 10–2 | Alen Amedovski | TKO (punches) | UFC Fight Night: Sandhagen vs. Song | September 17, 2022 | 1 | 3:55 | Las Vegas, Nevada, United States | Performance of the Night. |
| Win | 9–2 | Osman Diaz | TKO (punches) | Dana White's Contender Series 47 | July 26, 2022 | 2 | 1:39 | Las Vegas, Nevada, United States | |
| Win | 8–2 | Austin Trotman | KO (punch) | Cage Fury FC 104 | December 17, 2021 | 2 | 2:55 | Atlantic City, New Jersey, United States | |
| Loss | 7–2 | Dustin Stoltzfus | TKO (elbow injury) | Dana White's Contender Series 28 | August 11, 2020 | 1 | 4:21 | Las Vegas, Nevada, United States | |
| Win | 7–1 | Chase Gamble | TKO (punches) | Ring of Combat 71 | February 21, 2020 | 2 | 1:04 | Atlantic City, New Jersey, United States | |
| Loss | 6–1 | Jhonoven Pati | Submission (guillotine choke) | Ring of Combat 70 | November 23, 2019 | 2 | 1:00 | Atlantic City, New Jersey, United States | Lost the ROC Middleweight Championship. |
| Win | 6–0 | Matt Foster | TKO (punches) | Ring of Combat 69 | September 13, 2019 | 1 | 1:07 | Atlantic City, New Jersey, United States | Won the vacant ROC Middleweight Championship. |
| Win | 5–0 | Elijah Gbollie | KO (elbow and punch) | Ring of Combat 68 | May 31, 2019 | 2 | 1:36 | Atlantic City, New Jersey, United States | |
| Win | 4–0 | Eric Roncoroni | Submission (rear-naked choke) | Art of War Cage Fighting 11 | February 16, 2019 | 1 | 4:53 | Philadelphia, Pennsylvania, United States | Won the vacant AOWCF Middleweight Championship. |
| Win | 3–0 | Lorenzo Hunt | Technical Submission (rear-naked choke) | Art of War Cage Fighting 8 | October 5, 2018 | 1 | 3:47 | Philadelphia, Pennsylvania, United States | |
| Win | 2–0 | Derek Wilson | Decision (unanimous) | CES MMA 52 | August 17, 2018 | 3 | 5:00 | Philadelphia, Pennsylvania, United States | Catchweight (190 lb) bout. |
| Win | 1–0 | Steven Covington | TKO (punches) | Art of War Cage Fighting 7 | May 18, 2018 | 1 | 2:40 | Philadelphia, Pennsylvania, United States | Middleweight debut. |

== See also ==
- List of current UFC fighters
- List of Dana White's Contender Series alumni
- List of male mixed martial artists
