= UFC Fight Night: Holm vs. Vieira =

2022 mixed martial arts event

- The poster for UFC Fight Night: Holm vs. Vieira
- Promotion: Ultimate Fighting Championship
- Date: May 21, 2022
- Venue: UFC Apex
- City: Enterprise, Nevada, United States
- Attendance: Not announced

Event chronology
| UFC on ESPN: Błachowicz vs. Rakić | UFC Fight Night: Holm vs. Vieira | UFC Fight Night: Volkov vs. Rozenstruik |

UFC Fight Night: Holm vs. Vieira (also known as UFC Fight Night 206, UFC on ESPN+ 64 or UFC Vegas 55) was a mixed martial arts event produced by the Ultimate Fighting Championship that took place on May 21, 2022, at the UFC Apex facility in Enterprise, Nevada, part of the Las Vegas Metropolitan Area, United States.

== Background ==
A bantamweight bout between former UFC Women's Bantamweight Champion Holly Holm and Ketlen Vieira headlined the event.

A heavyweight bout between Ben Rothwell and former UFC Light Heavyweight Championship challenger Alexander Gustafsson was expected to take place at this event. However, the fight was canceled after Rothwell was released from the organization in late March. Gustafsson would go on to face Nikita Krylov in a light heavyweight bout at UFC Fight Night: Blaydes vs. Aspinall.

Maxim Grishin was expected to face Jailton Almeida in a light heavyweight bout at the event. However, Grishin pulled out due to undisclosed reasons in late April. Almeida decided to move up to heavyweight and faced Parker Porter instead.

== Results ==
Main card (ESPN+)
| Weight class | | | | Method | Round | Time | Notes |
|---|---|---|---|---|---|---|---|
| Women's Bantamweight | Ketlen Vieira | def. | Holly Holm | Decision (split) (47–48, 48–47, 48–47) | 5 | 5:00 |
| Welterweight | Michel Pereira | def. | Santiago Ponzinibbio | Decision (split) (28–29, 30–27, 29–28) | 3 | 5:00 |
| Middleweight | Chidi Njokuani | def. | Duško Todorović | KO (elbow) | 1 | 4:48 |
| Women's Strawweight | Tabatha Ricci | def. | Polyana Viana | Decision (unanimous) (29–28, 29–28, 29–28) | 3 | 5:00 |
| Middleweight | Jun Yong Park | def. | Eryk Anders | Decision (split) (28–29, 29–28, 29–28) | 3 | 5:00 |
Preliminary card (ESPN+)
| Middleweight | Joseph Holmes | def. | Alen Amedovski | Submission (rear-naked choke) | 1 | 1:04 |
| Heavyweight | Jailton Almeida | def. | Parker Porter | Submission (rear-naked choke) | 1 | 4:35 |
| Lightweight | Uroš Medić | def. | Omar Morales | TKO (punches) | 2 | 3:05 |
| Bantamweight | Jonathan Martinez | def. | Vince Morales | Decision (unanimous) (30–27, 30–27, 30–27) | 3 | 5:00 |
| Featherweight | Chase Hooper | def. | Felipe Colares | TKO (punches) | 3 | 3:00 |
| Women's Strawweight | Sam Hughes | def. | Elise Reed | TKO (elbow and punches) | 3 | 3:52 |

== Bonus awards ==
The following fighters received $50,000 bonuses.

- Fight of the Night: Michel Pereira vs. Santiago Ponzinibbio
- Performance of the Night: Chidi Njokuani and Chase Hooper

== See also ==
- List of UFC events
- List of current UFC fighters
- 2022 in UFC
