= Bruno Silva (fighter) =

Brazilian mixed martial artist (born 1989)

- Born: Bruno Arruda da Silva; July 13, 1989 (age 37); Cajazeiras, Paraíba, Brazil
- Other names: Blindado
- Height: 6 ft 0 in (1.83 m)
- Weight: 186 lb (84 kg; 13 st 4 lb)
- Division: Middleweight
- Reach: 74 in (188 cm)
- Team: Evolução Thai (2014–present)
- Rank: Black belt in Brazilian Jiu-Jitsu
- Years active: 2010–present

Mixed martial arts record
- Total: 36
- Wins: 23
- By knockout: 20
- By decision: 3
- Losses: 13
- By knockout: 1
- By submission: 7
- By decision: 4
- By disqualification: 1

Other information
- Mixed martial arts record from Sherdog

Bruno Arruda da Silva (born July 13, 1989) is a professional mixed martial artist who competed in the Middleweight division of the Ultimate Fighting Championship (UFC) from Paraíba, Brazil. He is a former M-1 Global Middleweight Champion.

== Background ==
Silva started training in 2009 and after three months, he had his first fight. He started out of curiosity, despite interior Paraíba not having much of a fighting culture. After the three months of training, Silva lost his father and began fighting as a form of therapy.

== Mixed martial arts career ==
=== Early career ===
Upon turning pro in 2010 up until 2012, Silva went just 6–5 in 11 contests. Silva racked up a record of 9–5 in Brazilian regional circuit before trying out for The Ultimate Fighter: Brazil 3 in 2013. “Blindado” then rattled off 14 wins in his last 16 outings. Silva lived in the northeast of Brazil, in a very small city that had no MMA structure, having to work in other professions. Silva credited his turn around to dedicating himself to his athletic career after 2012.

=== The Ultimate Fighter: Brazil ===
He passed the tryouts, advancing to the preliminary round where he however was knockout out by Vitor Miranda, and was eliminated from the season.

=== Russian circuit ===
After TUF tryouts Silva amassed seven more wins with one loss, and signed with Russian Cagefighting Championship. He made his promotional debut against Gennadiy Kovalev at RCC 2 on February 24, 2018. He won the fight via first-round knockout.

He then signed with M-1 Global and made his promotional debut against Alexander Shlemenko at M-1 Challenge 93 – Shlemenko vs. Silva on June 1, 2018. He won the fight via first round knockout.

The win lined him up for a fight against Artem Frolov for the M-1 Global Middleweight Championship which took place at M-1 Challenge 98 - Frolov vs. Silva on November 2, 2018. He claimed the championship via fourth-round technical knockout.

=== Ultimate Fighting Championship ===
In May 2019, it was announced that Silva had signed with the UFC. He was scheduled to replace injured Markus Perez against Deron Winn on June 22, 2019 at UFC Fight Night 154. On June 16, it was reported that Silva was forced to pull out of the contest due to a potential anti-doping violation by USADA and was replaced by returning veteran Eric Spicely. In January 2020, news surfaced that Silva was suspended for two years for testing positive for boldenone, but at the time USADA did not confirm the news due to pending hearing. Ultimately in late June 2020, USADA announced the suspension, stating Silva would be eligible to return to competition after June 14, 2021.

Ultimately, Silva made his promotional debut against Wellington Turman at UFC on ESPN 25 on June 19, 2021. Silva won the fight via first-round knockout.

In the sophomore appearance Silva faced Andrew Sanchez at UFC Fight Night 195 on October 16, 2021. He won the fight via technical knockout in round three. This win earned him the Performance of the Night award.

Silva next faced Jordan Wright at UFC 269 on December 11, 2021. He won the fight via TKO in the first round. The win also earned Silva his second consecutive Performance of the Night bonus award.

Silva faced Alex Pereira on March 12, 2022, at UFC Fight Night 203. Silva got outstruck for all three rounds and lost the fight via unanimous decision.

Silva faced Gerald Meerschaert on August 13, 2022, at UFC on ESPN 41 He lost the fight via a guillotine choke in round three.

Silva was scheduled to face Albert Duraev on December 17, 2022, at UFC Fight Night 216. However, he was pulled from the event due to injury and he was replaced by Michał Oleksiejczuk.

Silva faced Brad Tavares on April 22, 2023, at UFC Fight Night 222. He won the fight via technical knockout in the first round. This performance earned Silva his third Performance Of The Night award.

Silva faced Brendan Allen on June 24, 2023, at UFC on ABC 5. He lost the bout in the first round via a rear-naked choke submission.

Silva faced Shara Magomedov on October 21, 2023, at UFC 294. He lost the bout via unanimous decision.

Silva faced former UFC Middleweight Champion Chris Weidman on March 30, 2024, at UFC on ESPN 54. He lost the fight after a third-round TKO stoppage by the referee. The fight was later overruled to a technical unanimous decision win for Weidman, as Silva was poked in both eyes while Weidman was throwing the combination that dropped Silva. Silva claimed that he fell due to the eye pokes. Silva's attempt to appeal the decision loss was unsuccessful.

In August 2024, it was reported that Silva tested positive for an anabolic steroid submitted from a urine sample on April 11, 2024. As a result, he has been suspended for six months dating back to April 11, 2024 and will be able to compete again on October 11, 2024.

Silva faced Ismail Naurdiev on October 26, 2024 at UFC 308. He lost the fight by unanimous decision.

Silva faced Marc-André Barriault on May 10, 2025 at UFC 315. At the weigh-ins, Silva weighed in at 187 pounds, a pound over the weight non-title fight limit. The bout proceeded at catchweight and Silva was fined 20 percent of his purse which went to opponent Barriault. Silva lost the fight by knockout via elbows and punches in the first round.

On May 15, 2025, it was reported that Silva was removed from the UFC roster.

== Personal life ==
Silva and his fiancée have a daughter.

== Championships and accomplishments ==
- M-1 Global
  - M-1 Global Middleweight Championship (One time; former)
- Ultimate Fighting Championship
  - Performance of the Night (Three Times) vs. Andrew Sanchez, Jordan Wright and Brad Tavares
  - UFC.com Awards
    - 2021: Ranked #8 Newcomer of the Year

== Mixed martial arts record ==
Professional record breakdown
36 matches	23 wins	13 losses
By knockout	20	1
By submission	0	7
By decision	3	4
By disqualification	0	1

Res.	Record	Opponent	Method	Event	Date	Round	Time	Location	Notes
Loss	23–13	Marc-André Barriault	KO (elbows and punches)	UFC 315	May 10, 2025	1	1:27	Montreal, Quebec, Canada	Catchweight (187 lb) bout; Silva missed weight.
Loss	23–12	Ismail Naurdiev	Decision (unanimous)	UFC 308	October 26, 2024	3	5:00	Abu Dhabi, United Arab Emirates	
Loss	23–11	Chris Weidman	Technical Decision (unanimous)	UFC on ESPN: Blanchfield vs. Fiorot	March 30, 2024	3	2:18	Atlantic City, New Jersey, United States	Originally ruled a TKO (punches) win for Weidman; changed to a decision by the athletic commission due to Silva suffering an eye poke leading to the stoppage.
Loss	23–10	Sharabutdin Magomedov	Decision (unanimous)	UFC 294	October 21, 2023	3	5:00	Abu Dhabi, United Arab Emirates	
Loss	23–9	Brendan Allen	Submission (rear-naked choke)	UFC on ABC: Emmett vs. Topuria	June 24, 2023	1	4:39	Jacksonville, Florida, United States	
Win	23–8	Brad Tavares	TKO (knee and punch)	UFC Fight Night: Pavlovich vs. Blaydes	April 22, 2023	1	3:35	Las Vegas, Nevada, United States	Performance of the Night.
Loss	22–8	Gerald Meerschaert	Submission (guillotine choke)	UFC on ESPN: Vera vs. Cruz	August 13, 2022	3	1:39	San Diego, California, United States	
Loss	22–7	Alex Pereira	Decision (unanimous)	UFC Fight Night: Santos vs. Ankalaev	March 12, 2022	3	5:00	Las Vegas, Nevada, United States	
Win	22–6	Jordan Wright	TKO (punches)	UFC 269	December 11, 2021	1	1:28	Las Vegas, Nevada, United States	Performance of the Night.
Win	21–6	Andrew Sanchez	TKO (punches)	UFC Fight Night: Ladd vs. Dumont	October 16, 2021	3	2:35	Las Vegas, Nevada, United States	Performance of the Night.
Win	20–6	Wellington Turman	KO (punches)	UFC on ESPN: The Korean Zombie vs. Ige	June 19, 2021	1	4:45	Las Vegas, Nevada, United States	
Win	19–6	Artem Frolov	TKO (punches)	M-1 Challenge 98: Frolov vs. Silva	November 2, 2018	4	3:36	Chelyabinsk, Russia	Won the M-1 Global Middleweight Championship.
Win	18–6	Alexander Shlemenko	KO (punches)	M-1 Challenge 93: Shlemenko vs. Silva	June 1, 2018	1	2:54	Chelyabinsk, Russia	
Win	17–6	Gennadiy Kovalev	KO (knee)	RCC 2	February 24, 2018	1	4:10	Chelyabinsk, Russia	
Win	16–6	Matheus Mussato	TKO (punches)	Katana Fight 4	November 25, 2017	1	1:10	Colombo, Brazil	
Loss	15–6	Moise Rimbon	Submission (kimura)	Phoenix FC 1	December 10, 2016	2	4:12	Zouk Mikael, Lebanon	
Win	15–5	Tiago Varejão	Decision (unanimous)	Imortal FC 4	May 21, 2016	3	5:00	São José dos Pinhais, Brazil	
Win	14–5	Flavio Magon	Decision (unanimous)	Imortal FC 2	December 13, 2015	3	5:00	São José dos Pinhais, Brazil	
Win	13–5	Rodrigo Carlos	KO (punches)	Aspera FC 24	September 12, 2015	1	1:56	São José, Brazil	
Win	12–5	Fabio Aguiar	TKO (punches)	Iron Fight Combat 8	June 6, 2015	2	3:09	Feira de Santana, Brazil	
Win	11–5	Alex Junius	TKO (punches)	Curitiba Fight Pro 3	March 7, 2015	1	4:59	Curitiba, Brazil	
Win	10–5	José de Batista Neto	TKO (punches)	The Hill Fighters 3	September 20, 2014	1	1:29	Bento Gonçalves, Brazil	Catchweight (196 lb) bout.
Win	9–5	Douglas Almeida	KO (punches)	Crajubar Fight 2	July 6, 2013	1	3:16	Juazeiro do Norte, Brazil	
Win	8–5	Cássio de Oliveira	KO (punches)	Crajubar Fight 2	July 6, 2013	1	2:39	Juazeiro do Norte, Brazil	
Win	7–5	Janio da Silva Dantas	TKO (punches)	Crajubar Fight	March 30, 2013	1	2:50	Juazeiro do Norte, Brazil	
Win	6–5	Savio Montenegro	TKO (punches)	Xoperia Fight 2	September 22, 2012	1	3:27	Crato, Brazil	
Loss	5–5	Cássio de Oliveira	Submission (heel hook)	Carpina Fighting Championship 2	June 2, 2012	1	3:52	Carpina, Brazil	
Loss	5–4	Felipe Dantas	Submission (arm-triangle choke)	Paradise Fighting RN	March 10, 2012	1	1:36	Canguaretama, Brazil	
Win	5–3	Thiago Buarque	TKO (punches)	Campina Show Fight 3	October 27, 2011	2	4:12	Campina Grande, Brazil	
Win	4–3	Felipe Kezen	Decision (split)	Camaragibe Fight Championship	August 23, 2011	3	5:00	Camaragibe, Brazil	
Loss	3–3	Savio Montenegro	DQ (illegal upkick)	Ceara Fighters Championship 2	July 8, 2011	3	2:39	Juazeiro do Norte, Brazil	
Win	3–2	Eduardo Mahal	KO (punches)	Campina Show Fight 2	April 1, 2011	2	2:13	Campina Grande, Brazil	
Loss	2–2	Isac Almeida	Submission (arm-triangle choke)	Desafio Fighter 5	February 25, 2011	1	2:51	Cajazeiras, Brazil	
Win	2–1	Alisson Moura	TKO (Punches)	Desafio Fighter 4	December 11, 2010	1	4:02	Ipaumirim, Brazil	
Loss	1–1	Rodrigo Carlos	Submission (rear-naked choke)	Desafio Fighter 3	July 24, 2010	1	2:50	Sousa, Brazil	
Win	1–0	Junior Pitbull	TKO (knee injury)	Champions Night 14	June 5, 2010	2	2:55	Fortaleza, Brazil	Middleweight debut.

== See also ==
- List of male mixed martial artists
