= Marc-André Barriault =

Canadian mixed martial artist (born 1990)

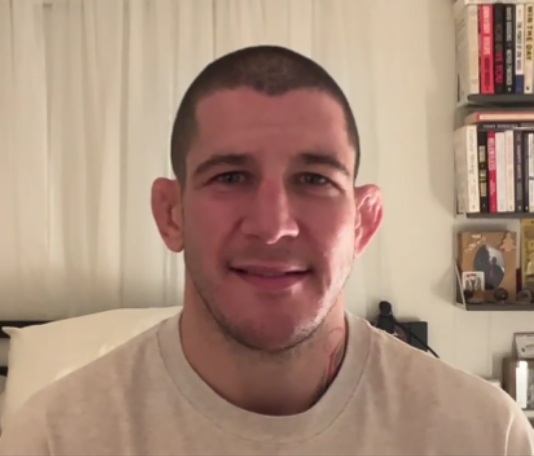
- Barriault in 2024
- Born: Marc-André Barriault; February 18, 1990 (age 36); Gatineau, Quebec, Canada
- Other names: Power Bar
- Height: 6 ft 1 in (1.85 m)
- Weight: 185 lb (84 kg; 13 st 3 lb)
- Division: Middleweight (2012–present); Light Heavyweight (2017–2018)
- Reach: 73 in (185 cm)
- Team: Patenaude Martial Arts - Gatineau; NOVA Gym – Quebec City; Sanford MMA (2021–present)
- Trainer: Sifu Patrick Marcil
- Rank: Blue belt in Brazilian Jiu-Jitsu under Herbert Burns
- Years active: 2012–present

Mixed martial arts record
- Total: 30
- Wins: 18
- By knockout: 12
- By submission: 1
- By decision: 5
- Losses: 11
- By knockout: 3
- By submission: 1
- By decision: 7
- No contests: 1

Other information
- Mixed martial arts record from Sherdog

Marc-André Barriault (born February 18, 1990) is a Canadian mixed martial arts (MMA) fighter who is currently signed to the Ultimate Fighting Championship's (UFC) Middleweight division. He previously competed with TKO Major League MMA where he won the TKO Middleweight Championship and the TKO Light Heavyweight Championship.

== Background ==
Barriault was born and raised in Gatineau, Quebec, Canada. He moved to Quebec City in 2011 to study. During this time he earned a DEC in dietetics and two culinary diplomas. He is of French descent.

== Mixed martial arts career ==
=== Early career ===
Barriault began competing in amateur mixed martial arts in 2012 under the tutelage of Sifu Patrick Marcil and finished with a record of 4–3. He also competed in FightQuest Amateur Combat in 2014 where he twice challenged for the FightQuest Middleweight Championship as well as the Vacant Hybrid Combat Middleweight Championship. After going professional in 2014 he competed in smaller promotions earning himself an impressive record of 11–1, During this time he managed to capture three championships in two different promotions (TKO Major League MMA, Hybrid Combat). Having previously won both the TKO Middleweight and Light Heavyweight Championships when he was invited to sign with the Ultimate Fighting Championship in 2019.

=== Ultimate Fighting Championship ===
Returning to Middleweight, Marc-André Barriault faced Andrew Sanchez in his promotional debut on May 4, 2019, at UFC Fight Night 151. He lost the fight via unanimous decision.

Barriault was next set to faced Krzysztof Jotko on July 7, 2019, at UFC 240. Barriault lost the fight via split-decision.

Barriault next faced Jun Yong Park on December 21, 2019, at UFC Fight Night 165. He lost the fight via unanimous decision.

Returning to action amidst the COVID-19 pandemic, Barriault faced Oskar Piechota on June 20, 2020, at UFC on ESPN 11. For his preparation for this fight, Barriault returned to his hometown of Gatineau and trained with his original training partner Dave Leduc, who had become Lethwei world champion. Barriault won the fight via TKO during the second round, earning him his first victory in the promotion.

On August 5, 2020, it was announced that the NSAC issued a temporary suspension for Barriault, after he tested positive for ostarine in his drug test associated with the Piechota fight. The suspension would hold until a full disciplinary hearing at the next NSAC meeting, expected to take place in September. Four months later, on December 4, 2020, the UFC announced that Barriault had accepted a six-month USADA suspension for testing positive in-competition for ostarine by the Nevada State Athlete Commission (NSAC). Furthermore, Barriault's win was overturned to a no contest. After a thorough investigation into Barriault's positive test, including follow-up testing, an evaluation of the circumstances surrounding his positive tests, and finding no evidence of intentional use, USADA gave him a reduced suspension that it was consistent with low-level ostarine cases with evidence of contamination. He was eligible to fight again on January 21, 2021. He was fined $2,100.

Barriault faced Abu Azaitar on March 27, 2021, at UFC 260. He won the fight via technical knockout in round three.

Barriault faced Dalcha Lungiambula on September 4, 2021, at UFC Fight Night 191. He won the fight via unanimous decision.

Barriault faced Chidi Njokuani on February 5, 2022, at UFC Fight Night 200. He lost the fight via knockout in round one.

Barriault faced Jordan Wright, replacing Roman Kopylov, on April 23, 2022, at UFC Fight Night 205. He won the fight via a guillotine choke in round one.

Barriault faced Anthony Hernandez on September 17, 2022, at UFC Fight Night 210. He lost the fight via a submission in round three.

Barriault faced Julian Marquez on March 4, 2023, at UFC 285. He won the fight via technical knockout in the second round.

Barriault faced Eryk Anders on June 10, 2023, at UFC 289. He won the bout via unanimous decision. The bout won the Fight of the Night bonus award.

Barriault was scheduled to face Michel Pereira on October 14, 2023, at UFC Fight Night 230. A week before the event, he withdrew due to medical issues and was replaced by Andre Petroski.

Barriault faced Chris Curtis on January 20, 2024, at UFC 297. He lost in a competitive bout by split decision.

Barriault faced Joe Pyfer on June 29, 2024, at UFC 303. He lost the fight by knockout in the first round.

Barriault faced Dustin Stoltzfus on November 2, 2024 at UFC Fight Night 246. He lost the fight via knockout in the first round.

Barriault faced Bruno Silva on May 10, 2025 at UFC 315. At the weigh-ins, Silva weighed in at 187 pounds, a pound over the weight non-title fight limit. The bout proceeded at catchweight and Silva was fined 20 percent of his purse which went to opponent Barriault. Barriault won the fight by knockout via elbows and punches in the first round. This fight earned him his first Performance of the Night award.

Barriault faced Sharabutdin Magomedov on July 26, 2025 at UFC on ABC 9. He lost the fight by unanimous decision. This fight earned him another Fight of the Night award.

Barriault faced Michał Oleksiejczuk on February 7, 2026, at UFC Fight Night 266. He lost the fight by unanimous decision. This fight earned him a $100,000 Fight of the Night award.

Barriault was scheduled to face Brad Tavares on July 18, 2026 at UFC Fight Night 281. However, Tavares pulled out due to undisclosed reasons, so the bout was cancelled.

Barriault faced Kyle Daukaus on October 17, 2026, at UFC Fight Night 291. He won the fight by technical knockout via elbows in the first round. This fight earned him a $100,000 Performance of the Night award.

== Personal life ==
Barriault is married to his wife Bianka. He enjoys cooking and worked as a cook in Canada until 2021, when he moved to Florida to pursue his MMA career further.

== Championships and accomplishments ==
- Ultimate Fighting Championship
  - Fight of the Night (Four times) vs. Eryk Anders, Sharabutdin Magomedov, Michał Oleksiejczuk and Kyle Daukaus
  - Performance of the Night (One time) vs. Bruno Silva
- TKO Major League MMA
  - TKO Middleweight Champion (One time; former)
    - One successful title defense
  - TKO Light Heavyweight Champion (One time; former)
- Hybrid Combat Promotions
  - Hybrid Combat Middleweight Champion

== Mixed martial arts record ==
Professional record breakdown
30 matches	18 wins	11 losses
By knockout	12	3
By submission	1	1
By decision	5	7
No contests	1	

Res.	Record	Opponent	Method	Event	Date	Round	Time	Location	Notes
Win	18–11 (1)	Kyle Daukaus	TKO (punches and elbows)	UFC Fight Night: Buckley vs. Malott	October 17, 2026	1	4:28	Edmonton, Alberta, Canada	Performance of the Night.
Loss	17–11 (1)	Michał Oleksiejczuk	Decision (unanimous)	UFC Fight Night: Bautista vs. Oliveira	February 7, 2026	3	5:00	Las Vegas, Nevada, United States	Fight of the Night.
Loss	17–10 (1)	Sharabutdin Magomedov	Decision (unanimous)	UFC on ABC: Whittaker vs. de Ridder	July 26, 2025	3	5:00	Abu Dhabi, United Arab Emirates	Fight of the Night.
Win	17–9 (1)	Bruno Silva	KO (elbows and punches)	UFC 315	May 10, 2025	1	1:27	Montreal, Quebec, Canada	Catchweight (187 lb) bout; Silva missed weight. Performance of the Night.
Loss	16–9 (1)	Dustin Stoltzfus	KO (punches)	UFC Fight Night: Moreno vs. Albazi	November 2, 2024	1	4:28	Edmonton, Alberta, Canada	
Loss	16–8 (1)	Joe Pyfer	KO (punches)	UFC 303	June 29, 2024	1	1:25	Las Vegas, Nevada, United States	
Loss	16–7 (1)	Chris Curtis	Decision (split)	UFC 297	January 20, 2024	3	5:00	Toronto, Ontario, Canada	
Win	16–6 (1)	Eryk Anders	Decision (unanimous)	UFC 289	June 10, 2023	3	5:00	Vancouver, British Columbia, Canada	Fight of the Night.
Win	15–6 (1)	Julian Marquez	TKO (punches)	UFC 285	March 4, 2023	2	4:12	Las Vegas, Nevada, United States	
Loss	14–6 (1)	Anthony Hernandez	Technical submission (arm-triangle choke)	UFC Fight Night: Sandhagen vs. Song	September 17, 2022	3	1:53	Las Vegas, Nevada, United States	
Win	14–5 (1)	Jordan Wright	Submission (guillotine choke)	UFC Fight Night: Lemos vs. Andrade	April 23, 2022	1	2:36	Las Vegas, Nevada, United States	Catchweight (190 lb) bout.
Loss	13–5 (1)	Chidi Njokuani	KO (punches)	UFC Fight Night: Hermansson vs. Strickland	February 5, 2022	1	0:16	Las Vegas, Nevada, United States	
Win	13–4 (1)	Dalcha Lungiambula	Decision (unanimous)	UFC Fight Night: Brunson vs. Till	September 4, 2021	3	5:00	Las Vegas, Nevada, United States	
Win	12–4 (1)	Abu Azaitar	TKO (punches)	UFC 260	March 27, 2021	3	4:56	Las Vegas, Nevada, United States	
NC	11–4 (1)	Oskar Piechota	NC (overturned)	UFC on ESPN: Blaydes vs. Volkov	June 20, 2020	2	4:50	Las Vegas, Nevada, United States	Originally a TKO (punches) win for Barriault; overturned after he tested positive for ostarine.
Loss	11–4	Park Jun-yong	Decision (unanimous)	UFC Fight Night: Edgar vs. The Korean Zombie	December 21, 2019	3	5:00	Busan, South Korea	
Loss	11–3	Krzysztof Jotko	Decision (split)	UFC 240	July 27, 2019	3	5:00	Edmonton, Alberta, Canada	
Loss	11–2	Andrew Sanchez	Decision (unanimous)	UFC Fight Night: Iaquinta vs. Cowboy	May 4, 2019	3	5:00	Ottawa, Ontario, Canada	Return to Middleweight.
Win	11–1	Adam Hunter	KO (punches)	TKO 44	September 21, 2018	1	4:28	Québec City, Québec, Canada	Won the vacant TKO Light Heavyweight Championship.
Win	10–1	Brendan Kornberger	KO (punch)	TKO 43	May 4, 2018	2	4:25	Québec City, Quebec, Canada	Defended the TKO Middleweight Championship.
Win	9–1	Strahinja Gavrilovic	Decision (split)	TKO 41	December 8, 2017	5	5:00	Montreal, Quebec, Canada	Won the vacant TKO Middleweight Championship.
Win	8–1	Todd Stoute	Decision (split)	TKO 40	September 8, 2017	3	5:00	Montreal, Quebec, Canada	Light Heavyweight debut.
Win	7–1	Jo Vallée	TKO (retirement)	TKO 39	June 16, 2017	2	5:00	Quebec City, Quebec, Canada	
Win	6–1	Yacine Bandaoui	KO (punch)	TKO 38	April 7, 2017	1	3:54	Montreal, Quebec, Canada	
Win	5–1	Strahinja Gavrilovic	Decision (split)	Hybrid Pro Series 5	September 15, 2016	3	5:00	Montreal, Quebec, Canada	Won the vacant Hybrid Combat Middleweight Championship.
Win	4–1	Martin Leblanc	TKO (punches)	LAMMQ 5	May 21, 2016	2	3:06	Quebec City, Quebec, Canada	Catchweight (190 lb) bout.
Loss	3–1	Jo Vallée	Decision (split)	Hybrid Pro Series 4	September 17, 2015	3	5:00	Montreal, Quebec, Canada	
Win	3–0	James Kouame	TKO (punches)	LAMMQ 4	June 6, 2015	1	1:19	Quebec City, Quebec, Canada	Catchweight (195 lb) bout.
Win	2–0	James Kouame	KO (punch)	Hybrid Pro Series 2	November 15, 2014	1	3:50	Gatineau, Quebec, Canada	
Win	1–0	Paul Cressaty	KO (punch)	LAMMQ 3	June 21, 2014	1	2:22	Quebec City, Quebec, Canada	Middleweight debut.

== See also ==
- List of Canadian UFC fighters
- List of current UFC fighters
- List of male mixed martial artists
