= Duško Todorović =

Serbian mixed martial arts fighter

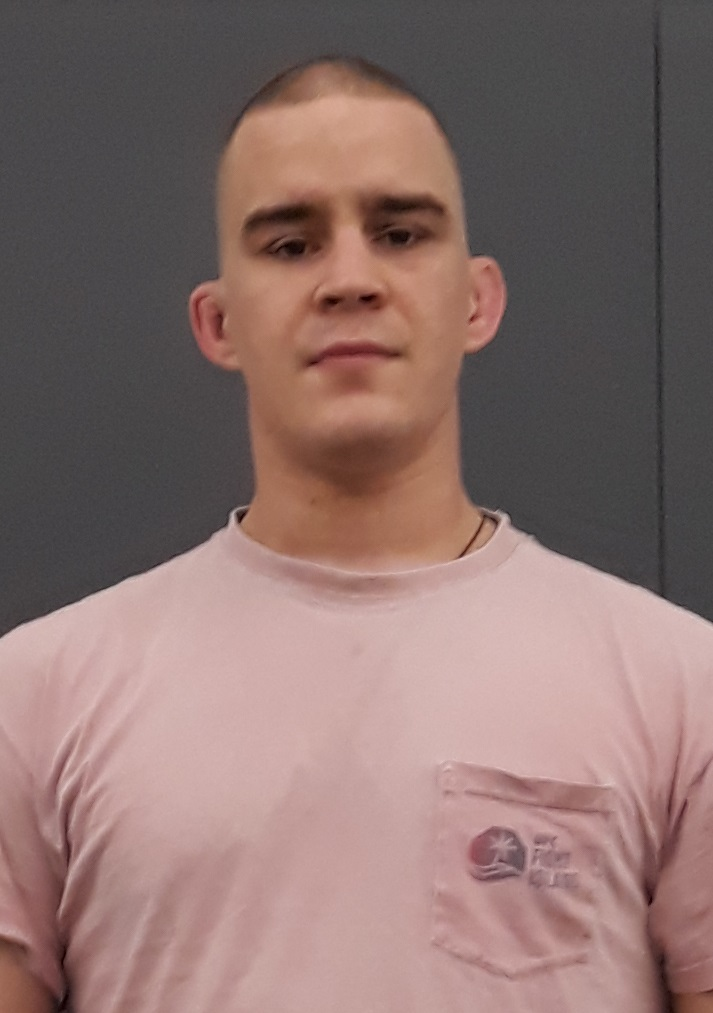
- Born: May 19, 1994 (age 32); Kotor, Montenegro, FR Yugoslavia
- Native name: Душко Тодоровић
- Other names: Kruško
- Nationality: Serbian
- Height: 6 ft 1 in (1.85 m)
- Weight: 185 lb (84 kg; 13 st 3 lb)
- Division: Middleweight
- Reach: 74 in (188 cm)
- Stance: Orthodox
- Fighting out of: Belgrade, Serbia
- Team: Thunder Top Team
- Rank: Black belt in Brazilian Jiu-Jitsu; Black belt in Taekwondo
- Years active: 2015–present

Mixed martial arts record
- Total: 20
- Wins: 13
- By knockout: 8
- By submission: 4
- By decision: 1
- Losses: 7
- By knockout: 4
- By submission: 1
- By decision: 2

Other information
- Mixed martial arts record from Sherdog

Duško Todorović (Serbian Cyrillic: Душко Тодоровић; born May 19, 1994) is a Serbian mixed martial artist who competes in the Middleweight division of the Ultimate Fighting Championship (UFC).

== Background ==
Todorović started training taekwondo around the age of eight, continuing until his late teens. He would also pick up wrestling and grappling along the way and after faring well in all disciplines, Todorović started training mixed martial arts around the age of 16. Todorović attended the Informational Technologies School at the University of Belgrade, where he graduated with a thesis about Organization of Business Systems.

== Mixed martial arts career ==
=== Early career ===
Going 10-0 as an amateur, Todorović made his professional debut in 2015 under the Serbian Battle Championship banner, where he would spend most off his pre-UFC career. During his time there, Todorović took on and defeated the likes off DWCS alumni Alexander Poppeck and future UFC welterweight Michel Pereira, giving Pereira the only KO loss of his career to that point.

=== Dana White's Contender Series ===
Todorović was invited to participate on Dana White's Contender Series 26 on August 27, 2019, against Teddy Ash. Todorović won the bout in convincing fashion via unanimous decision and earned a contract to the UFC.

=== Ultimate Fighting Championship ===
Most of his 2020 was spent trying to arrange a UFC debut against John Phillips but this contest was cancelled three times due to the COVID-19 pandemic. Todorović was scheduled to face Phillips on 21 March 2020 at UFC Fight Night: Woodley vs. Edwards. Due to the COVID-19 pandemic travel bans, the bout was moved to Cage Warriors 113 but was later on removed from the card due to Todorović's travel restrictions. Todorović was expected to face Phillips on 16 July 2020 at UFC Fight Night: Kattar vs. Ige. On 8 July Todorović pulled out due to a potential medical issue.

Todorović finally made his UFC debut against Dequan Townsend on October 4, 2020, at UFC on ESPN: Holm vs. Aldana. He won the fight via technical knockout in round two. This win earned him the Performance of the Night bonus.

Todorović faced fellow DWCS alumni Punahele Soriano on January 16, 2021, at UFC on ABC: Holloway vs. Kattar. He lost for the first time in his career, getting TKO'd by Soriano at the end of the first round.

As the last fight of his contract, Todorović was scheduled to face Maki Pitolo on June 5, 2021, at UFC Fight Night 189. However, two weeks ahead of the bout, Pitolo had to pull out for unknown reasons and was replaced by Gregory Rodrigues. He lost the bout via unanimous decision.

The bout between Pitolo and Todorović was rescheduled on December 4, 2021, at UFC on ESPN 31. He won the fight via technical knockout in round one.

Todorović faced Chidi Njokuani on May 21, 2022, at UFC Fight Night 206. He lost the fight via knockout in round one.

Todorović faced Jordan Wright on October 15, 2022, at UFC Fight Night 212. He won the fight via technical knockout in round two. This fight earned him the Fight of the Night award.

Todorović faced Christian Leroy Duncan on March 18, 2023, at UFC 286. He lost the fight via technical knockout after a knee injury rendered him unable to continue in round one.

Todorović was scheduled to face Edmen Shahbazyan on March 23, 2024, at UFC on ESPN 53. However, Todorović pulled out due to a serious knee injury and was replaced by A.J. Dobson.

Todorović faced promotional newcomer Mansur Abdul-Malik on November 9, 2024 at UFC Fight Night 247. He lost the fight by technical knockout in the first round.

Todorović faced Zachary Reese on May 31, 2025 at UFC on ESPN 68. He lost the fight by unanimous decision.

Todorović faced José Medina on September 13, 2025 at UFC Fight Night 259. He won the fight via a rear-naked choke submission in the first round.

Todorović was scheduled to face Donte Johnson on March 7, 2026, at UFC 326. However, Todorović withdrew for undisclosed reasons and was replaced by Cody Brundage.

Todorović faced Robert Valentin on August 1, 2026 at UFC Fight Night 283. He lost the fight in the first round by a guillotine choke submission.

== Championships and accomplishments ==
=== Mixed martial arts ===
- Ultimate Fighting Championship
  - Performance of the Night (One time) vs. Dequan Townsend
  - Fight of the Night (One time) vs. Jordan Wright
- Serbian Battle Championship
  - SBC Middleweight Championship (One time)

== Mixed martial arts record ==
Professional record breakdown
| 20 matches | 13 wins | 7 losses |
| By knockout | 8 | 4 |
| By submission | 4 | 1 |
| By decision | 1 | 2 |

| Res. | Record | Opponent | Method | Event | Date | Round | Time | Location | Notes |
|---|---|---|---|---|---|---|---|---|---|
| Loss | 13–7 | Robert Valentin | Submission (guillotine choke) | UFC Fight Night: Medić vs. Rodriguez | August 1, 2026 | 1 | 4:14 | Belgrade, Serbia | |
| Win | 13–6 | José Medina | Submission (rear-naked choke) | UFC Fight Night: Lopes vs. Silva | September 13, 2025 | 1 | 4:21 | San Antonio, Texas, United States | |
| Loss | 12–6 | Zachary Reese | Decision (unanimous) | UFC on ESPN: Gamrot vs. Klein | May 31, 2025 | 3 | 5:00 | Las Vegas, Nevada, United States | |
| Loss | 12–5 | Mansur Abdul-Malik | TKO (knee and punches) | UFC Fight Night: Magny vs. Prates | November 9, 2024 | 1 | 2:44 | Las Vegas, Nevada, United States | |
| Loss | 12–4 | Christian Leroy Duncan | TKO (knee injury) | UFC 286 | March 18, 2023 | 1 | 1:52 | London, England | |
| Win | 12–3 | Jordan Wright | TKO (punches and elbows) | UFC Fight Night: Grasso vs. Araújo | October 15, 2022 | 2 | 3:12 | Las Vegas, Nevada, United States | Fight of the Night. |
| Loss | 11–3 | Chidi Njokuani | KO (elbow) | UFC Fight Night: Holm vs. Vieira | May 21, 2022 | 1 | 4:48 | Las Vegas, Nevada, United States | |
| Win | 11–2 | Maki Pitolo | TKO (punches) | UFC on ESPN: Font vs. Aldo | December 4, 2021 | 1 | 4:34 | Las Vegas, Nevada, United States | |
| Loss | 10–2 | Gregory Rodrigues | Decision (unanimous) | UFC Fight Night: Rozenstruik vs. Sakai | June 5, 2021 | 3 | 5:00 | Las Vegas, Nevada, United States | |
| Loss | 10–1 | Punahele Soriano | TKO (punches) | UFC on ABC: Holloway vs. Kattar | January 16, 2021 | 1 | 4:48 | Abu Dhabi, United Arab Emirates | |
| Win | 10–0 | Dequan Townsend | TKO (punches) | UFC on ESPN: Holm vs. Aldana | October 4, 2020 | 2 | 3:15 | Abu Dhabi, United Arab Emirates | Performance of the Night. |
| Win | 9–0 | Teddy Ash | Decision (unanimous) | Dana White's Contender Series 26 | August 27, 2019 | 3 | 5:00 | Las Vegas, Nevada, United States | |
| Win | 8–0 | Michel Pereira | TKO (punches) | Serbian Battle Championship 19 | December 1, 2018 | 1 | 4:32 | Novi Sad, Serbia | Won the vacant SBC Middleweight Championship. |
| Win | 7–0 | Kazuo Takahashi | TKO (punches) | Rings: The Outsider 51 | July 21, 2018 | 1 | 1:41 | Kawasaki, Japan | |
| Win | 6–0 | Shota Gvasalia | TKO (arm injury) | Collision Fighting League 3 | June 3, 2018 | 2 | 2:11 | Belgrade, Serbia | |
| Win | 5–0 | Alexander Poppeck | Submission (rear-naked choke) | Final Fight Championship 30 | October 21, 2017 | 2 | 4:52 | Linz, Austria | Catchweight (190 lb) bout. |
| Win | 4–0 | Albert Micura | TKO (punches) | Serbian Battle Championship 9 | April 16, 2016 | 2 | 1:09 | Odžaci, Serbia | |
| Win | 3–0 | Toni Markulev | TKO (punches) | Naissus FC 2 | December 11, 2015 | 2 | 1:54 | Niš, Serbia | |
| Win | 2–0 | František Boban | Submission (armbar) | Fight of Gladiators: Night of Champions 2 | October 23, 2015 | 1 | 1:37 | Trnava, Slovakia | |
| Win | 1–0 | Srđan Knežević | Submission (guillotine choke) | Serbian Battle Championship 6 | September 19, 2015 | 1 | 0:44 | Kać, Serbia | Middleweight debut. |

== See also ==
- List of current UFC fighters
- List of male mixed martial artists
