= UFC 240 =

UFC mixed martial arts event in 2019

UFC 240: Holloway vs. Edgar
- The poster for UFC 240: Holloway vs. Edgar
- Promotion: Ultimate Fighting Championship
- Date: July 27, 2019
- Venue: Rogers Place
- City: Edmonton, Alberta, Canada
- Attendance: 12,144
- Total gate: $1.4 million

Event chronology
UFC on ESPN: dos Anjos vs. Edwards	UFC 240: Holloway vs. Edgar	UFC on ESPN: Covington vs. Lawler

UFC 240: Holloway vs. Edgar was a mixed martial arts event produced by the Ultimate Fighting Championship that took place on July 27, 2019 at Rogers Place in Edmonton, Alberta, Canada.

== Background ==
A UFC Featherweight Championship bout between current champion Max Holloway and former UFC Lightweight Champion Frankie Edgar headlined the event. The pairing was scheduled twice before, first at UFC 218 and then at UFC 222, but scrapped for Edgar and Holloway injuries, respectively.

A women's flyweight bout between former Invicta FC Bantamweight Champion Lauren Murphy and Mara Romero Borella was initially scheduled for this event. On June 20, matchmakers moved the bout a week ahead to UFC on ESPN: Covington vs. Lawler.

A heavyweight bout between Tanner Boser and Giacomo Lemos was scheduled. On July 25, the bout was scrapped due to Lemos testing positive for an unspecified banned substance.

== Results ==
Main card
Weight class				Method	Round	Time	Notes
Featherweight	Max Holloway (c)	def.	Frankie Edgar	Decision (unanimous) (50–45, 49–46, 48–47)	5	5:00	(Note: For the UFC Featherweight Championship.)
Women's Featherweight	Cris Cyborg	def.	Felicia Spencer	Decision (unanimous) (30–27, 30–27, 30–27)	3	5:00
Welterweight	Geoff Neal	def.	Niko Price	TKO (punches)	2	2:39
Lightweight	Arman Tsarukyan	def.	Olivier Aubin-Mercier	Decision (unanimous) (29–28, 29–28, 29–28)	3	5:00
Middleweight	Krzysztof Jotko	def.	Marc-André Barriault	Decision (split) (29–28, 28–29, 29–28)	3	5:00
Preliminary card (ESPN)
Women's Flyweight	Viviane Araújo	def.	Alexis Davis	Decision (unanimous) (29–28, 29–28, 29–28)	3	5:00
Featherweight	Hakeem Dawodu	def.	Yoshinori Horie	TKO (head kick)	3	4:09
Featherweight	Gavin Tucker	def.	Seung Woo Choi	Submission (rear-naked choke)	3	3:17	(Note: Tucker was deducted a point in Round 2 due to an illegal knee to a downed opponent.)
Flyweight	Deiveson Figueiredo	def.	Alexandre Pantoja	Decision (unanimous) (30–27, 30–27, 30–27)	3	5:00
Early Preliminary card (UFC Fight Pass)
Women's Flyweight	Gillian Robertson	def.	Sarah Frota	TKO (elbows)	2	4:13
Welterweight	Erik Koch	def.	Kyle Stewart	Decision (unanimous) (30–27, 29–28, 29–28)	3	5:00

== Bonus awards ==
The following fighters received $50,000 bonuses.

- Fight of the Night: Deiveson Figueiredo vs. Alexandre Pantoja
- Performance of the Night: Geoff Neal and Hakeem Dawodu

== See also ==
- List of UFC events
- 2019 in UFC
- List of current UFC fighters
