= Chidi Njokuani =

American mixed martial artist

- Born: Chidi Godson Njoku-Ani; December 31, 1988 (age 37); Dallas, Texas, U.S.
- Other names: Chidi Bang Bang
- Height: 6 ft 3 in (1.91 m)
- Weight: 185 lb (84 kg; 13 st 3 lb)
- Division: Light Heavyweight (Kickboxing); Welterweight/Middleweight (MMA)
- Reach: 80 in (203 cm)
- Style: Muay Thai
- Stance: Orthodox
- Fighting out of: Garland, Texas, U.S.
- Team: Janjira Muay Thai; One Kick's Gym; Sergio Penha BJJ
- Trainer: Saeksan Janjira; Nick "One Kick" Blomgren; Sergio Penha
- Rank: Black belt in Brazilian Jiu-Jitsu
- Years active: 2007–present

Kickboxing record
- Total: 14
- Wins: 12
- By knockout: 7
- Losses: 1
- Draws: 1

Mixed martial arts record
- Total: 39
- Wins: 26
- By knockout: 15
- By submission: 1
- By decision: 10
- Losses: 12
- By knockout: 5
- By submission: 4
- By decision: 3
- No contests: 1

Other information
- Notable relatives: Anthony Njokuani (brother)
- Mixed martial arts record from Sherdog

Chidi Godson Njokuani (born December 31, 1988) is an American professional mixed martial artist, former Muay Thai fighter, and kickboxer, who currently competes in the Welterweight division of the Ultimate Fighting Championship (UFC). A professional since 2007, he also formerly competed for Bellator MMA, RFA, Tachi Palace Fights, and Legacy FC.

== Background ==
Chidi Njokuani was born to Nigerian parents in Dallas, Texas on December 31, 1988. His name "Chidi" means "God exists" in Igbo. He was introduced to Muay Thai by his older brother Anthony at the age of 10 and began competing at the age of 11. He was temporarily distracted from Muay Thai with skateboarding during his teenage years but eventually returned to fighting and discovered mixed martial arts at the age of 18.

== Kickboxing & Muay Thai career ==
Turning professional in 2007 after around fifteen amateur Muay Thai fights, Chidi Njokuani came to prominence competing in the -80.7 kg/178 lb division for the Oklahoma Destroyers in the team-based World Combat League kickboxing promotion during the 2007–08 season in which he lost matches to such notables as Raymond Daniels and Lyman Good. He suffered his first professional Muay Thai loss at the hands of Joe Schilling on April 25, 2009 (dropping a unanimous decision at Dominant Knockout 1 in Irving, Texas) but rebounded with back-to-back defeats of Edwin Aguilar (a UD win under Oriental kickboxing rules at Kickboxing Empire I in Las Vegas, Nevada on July 30, 2011) and Ken Tran (a second round knockout at Lion Fight: Battle in the Desert 4 in Las Vegas on November 19, 2011).

Returning to the Muay Thai ring, Njokuani fought to a controversial majority draw with Simon Marcus on the Push Kick Promotions: Muay Thai World Stand Off 5 card in Las Vegas on September 29, 2013. Njokuani started the fight well, using footwork to control the ring, but Marcus soon got inside and began landing knees and elbows from the clinch. In round two, Njokuani was twice given time to recover from illegal strikes, an elbow to the back of the head and a low blow. Each time the fight continued, Marcus would begin to again work in the clinch and Njokuani repeatedly turned his back, so the referee decided to break the fighters continually. Marcus was docked a point by referee Tony Weeks for landing a second low blow in round three and the fight turned into a brawl towards the end. When it went to the judges, the bout was declared a majority draw with two judges scoring the bout a draw and one scoring the bout for Njokuani. Simon Marcus then took to the microphone, calling Chidi Njokuani a "bitch" for his unwillingness to fight in the clinch and questioning the judges knowledge of the Muay Thai scoring system. These post-fight comments led to a heated confrontation between Marcus and Chidi's brother Anthony as they scuffled back stage.

== Mixed martial arts career ==
=== Resurrection Fighting Alliance ===
Having compiled a 7–3 record as a mixed martial artist, Njokuani signed with the Resurrection Fighting Alliance in 2012. He made his RFA debut at RFA 3: Stevenson vs. Cochrane, against Bobby Cooper. He won via the first decision of his career.

Njokuani then was paired up with Phil Dace at RFA 4. He won via TKO.

Njokuani fought Jeremy Kimball at RFA 7 and lost via submission.

=== Bellator MMA ===
In June 2015, it was announced that Njokuani had signed with Bellator MMA. He made his debut against Ricky Rainey at Bellator 146 on November 20, 2015. He won the fight by unanimous decision.

In his second fight for the promotion, Njokuani was scheduled to face Douglas Lima, however Lima pulled out of the bout and was replaced b Thiago Jambo at Bellator 156 on June 17, 2016. He won that fight via knockout due to a combination of body kick and punches.

In his highest profile fight for the promotion, Njokuani faced undefeated prospect André Fialho at Bellator 167 on December 3, 2016. He won the fight via knockout just 21 seconds into the first round.

Making a quick return to the cage, Njokuani faced Melvin Guillard in the main event at Bellator 171 on January 27, 2017. He won the fight by unanimous decision.

Njokuani faced former Bellator welterweight champion Andrey Koreshkov at Bellator 182 on August 25, 2017. He lost the fight in the first round via a combination of punches and elbows.

Njokuani next moved up to Middleweight to face Hisaki Kato at Bellator 189 on December 1, 2017. He won the fight by unanimous decision.

Njokuani was scheduled to face Melvin Manhoef on November 30, 2018 at Bellator 210. However, Manhoef withdrew from the bout due to injury and was replaced by John Salter. Njokuani lost the bout via submission in the first round.

Njokuani faced Rafael Carvalho at Bellator 224 in a 190-pound Catchweight bout on July 12, 2019. He lost the fight by unanimous decision. Njokuani was subsequently released from the promotion.

=== Post-Bellator ===
After being released from Bellator, Njokuani signed a contract with Legacy Fighting Alliance. He made his promotional debut against Cristhian Torres at LFA 91: Njokuani vs. Torres on September 11, 2020, winning by second-round technical knockout.

Njokuani faced Mario Sousa on September 7, 2021 at Dana White's Contender Series 38. He won the bout in the third round via ground and pound elbows. In the process, he also secured a UFC contract.

=== Ultimate Fighting Championship ===
In his UFC debut, Njokuani faced Marc-André Barriault on February 5, 2022 at UFC Fight Night 200. He won the fight via knockout in round one. This fight earned him the Performance of the Night award.

Njokuani next faced Duško Todorović on May 21, 2022 at UFC Fight Night 206. He won the fight via knockout due to an elbow at the end of the first round. This win earned him a second consecutive Performance of the Night award.

Njokuani faced Gregory Rodrigues on September 17, 2022 at UFC Fight Night 210. He lost the fight via technical knockout in round two. This fight earned him the Fight of the Night award.

Njokuani faced Albert Duraev on March 25, 2023 at UFC on ESPN 43. He lost the fight via split decision.

Njokuani faced Michał Oleksiejczuk at UFC Fight Night 225 on August 26, 2023. He lost the bout via first round ground and pound TKO stoppage at the end of the first round.

Njokuani faced Rhys McKee on March 30, 2024, at UFC on ESPN 54. He won the fight via split decision.

Njokuani faced Jared Gooden on October 12, 2024 at UFC Fight Night 244. At the weigh-ins, Gooden weighed in at 172.5 pounds, one and a half pounds over the welterweight non-title fight limit. The bout proceeded at catchweight and Gooden was fined 20 percent of his purse which went to Njokuani. He won the fight by unanimous decision.

Njokuani was reportedly scheduled to compete on February 22, 2025 at UFC Fight Night 252. However, instead, he faced Elizeu Zaleski dos Santos on March 15, 2025, at UFC Fight Night 254. At the weigh-ins, Njokuani weighed in at 172.5 pounds, one and a quarter pounds over the welterweight non-title fight limit. The bout proceeded at catchweight and Njokuani was fined 20 percent of his purse which went to Zaleski dos Santos. Njokuani won the fight by technical knockout via a knee and elbows in the second round.

Njokuani faced Jake Matthews at UFC on ESPN 70 in Nashville, Tennessee on July 12, 2025. He lost the fight via a rear-naked choke submission in the first round.

Njokuani faced Carlos Leal Miranda on February 21, 2026 at UFC Fight Night 267. He lost the fight by unanimous decision.

Njokuani was scheduled to face Geoff Neal on August 15, 2026 at UFC 330. However, Neal had to withdraw for undisclosed reasons and was replaced by Joel Álvarez. Njokuani won the fight by unanimous decision.

Njokuani is scheduled to face Ignacio Bahamondes on January 16, 2027, at UFC Fight Night 296.

== Championships and accomplishments ==
- Ultimate Fighting Championship
  - Performance of the Night (Two times) vs. Marc-André Barriault and Duško Todorović
  - Fight of the Night (One time) vs. Gregory Rodrigues
  - UFC.com Awards
    - 2022: Ranked #6 Newcomer of the Year
- Tachi Palace Fights
  - Tachi PF Welterweight Championship (One time; former)
- MMA Fighting
  - 2022 Third Team MMA All-Star

== Mixed martial arts record ==
Professional record breakdown
39 matches	26 wins	12 losses
By knockout	15	5
By submission	1	4
By decision	10	3
No contests	1	

Res.	Record	Opponent	Method	Event	Date	Round	Time	Location	Notes
Win	26–12 (1)	Joel Álvarez	Decision (unanimous)	UFC 330	August 15, 2026	3	5:00	Philadelphia, Pennsylvania, United States	
Loss	25–12 (1)	Carlos Leal Miranda	Decision (unanimous)	UFC Fight Night: Strickland vs. Hernandez	February 21, 2026	3	5:00	Houston, Texas, United States	
Loss	25–11 (1)	Jake Matthews	Submission (rear-naked choke)	UFC on ESPN: Lewis vs. Teixeira	July 12, 2025	1	1:09	Nashville, Tennessee, United States	
Win	25–10 (1)	Elizeu Zaleski dos Santos	TKO (knee and elbows)	UFC Fight Night: Vettori vs. Dolidze 2	March 15, 2025	2	2:19	Las Vegas, Nevada, United States	Catchweight (172.25 lb) bout; Njokuani missed weight.
Win	24–10 (1)	Jared Gooden	Decision (unanimous)	UFC Fight Night: Royval vs. Taira	October 12, 2024	3	5:00	Las Vegas, Nevada, United States	Catchweight (172.5 lb) bout; Gooden missed weight.
Win	23–10 (1)	Rhys McKee	Decision (split)	UFC on ESPN: Blanchfield vs. Fiorot	March 30, 2024	3	5:00	Atlantic City, New Jersey, United States	Return to Welterweight.
Loss	22–10 (1)	Michał Oleksiejczuk	TKO (punches)	UFC Fight Night: Holloway vs. The Korean Zombie	August 26, 2023	1	4:16	Kallang, Singapore	
Loss	22–9 (1)	Albert Duraev	Decision (split)	UFC on ESPN: Vera vs. Sandhagen	March 25, 2023	3	5:00	San Antonio, Texas, United States	
Loss	22–8 (1)	Gregory Rodrigues	TKO (punches)	UFC Fight Night: Sandhagen vs. Song	September 17, 2022	2	1:27	Las Vegas, Nevada, United States	Fight of the Night.
Win	22–7 (1)	Duško Todorović	KO (elbow)	UFC Fight Night: Holm vs. Vieira	May 21, 2022	1	4:48	Las Vegas, Nevada, United States	Performance of the Night.
Win	21–7 (1)	Marc-André Barriault	KO (punches)	UFC Fight Night: Hermansson vs. Strickland	February 5, 2022	1	0:16	Las Vegas, Nevada, United States	Performance of the Night.
Win	20–7 (1)	Mário Felipe de Sousa	TKO (elbows)	Dana White's Contender Series 38	September 7, 2021	3	1:35	Las Vegas, Nevada, United States	
Win	19–7 (1)	Cristhian Torres	TKO (knee to the body and punches)	LFA 91	September 11, 2020	2	4:10	Sioux Falls, South Dakota, United States	
Loss	18–7 (1)	Rafael Carvalho	Decision (unanimous)	Bellator 224	July 12, 2019	3	5:00	Thackerville, Oklahoma, United States	Catchweight (190 lb) bout.
Loss	18–6 (1)	John Salter	Submission (rear-naked choke)	Bellator 210	November 30, 2018	1	4:32	Thackerville, Oklahoma, United States	
Win	18–5 (1)	Hisaki Kato	Decision (unanimous)	Bellator 189	December 1, 2017	3	5:00	Thackerville, Oklahoma, United States	Return to Middleweight.
Loss	17–5 (1)	Andrey Koreshkov	TKO (punches and elbows)	Bellator 182	August 25, 2017	1	4:08	Verona, New York, United States	Catchweight (175 lb) bout; Njokuani missed weight.
Win	17–4 (1)	Melvin Guillard	Decision (unanimous)	Bellator 171	January 27, 2017	3	5:00	Mulvane, Kansas, United States	Catchweight (180 lb) bout.
Win	16–4 (1)	André Fialho	TKO (punches)	Bellator 167	December 3, 2016	1	0:21	Thackerville, Oklahoma, United States	Catchweight (174.8 lb) bout; Njokuani missed weight.
Win	15–4 (1)	Thiago Gonçalves	KO (body kick and punches)	Bellator 156	June 17, 2016	3	2:39	Fresno, California, United States	
Win	14–4 (1)	Ricky Rainey	Decision (unanimous)	Bellator 146	November 20, 2015	3	5:00	Thackerville, Oklahoma, United States	
Win	13–4 (1)	Max Griffin	Decision (split)	Tachi Palace Fights 23	May 7, 2015	5	5:00	Lemoore, California, United States	Won the TPF Welterweight Championship.
Win	12–4 (1)	Gilbert Smith	Decision (unanimous)	RFA 22	January 9, 2015	5	5:00	Colorado Springs, Colorado, United States	For the vacant RFA Welterweight Championship. Njokuani missed weight (174.6 lb) and was ineligible for the title.
Win	11–4 (1)	Steve Hanna	Decision (unanimous)	RFA 18	September 12, 2014	3	5:00	Albuquerque, New Mexico, United States	Catchweight (173.4 lb) bout; Njokuani missed weight.
NC	10–4 (1)	Chris Heatherly	NC (elbow to spine)	RFA 13	March 7, 2014	1	3:31	Lincoln, Nebraska, United States	Catchweight (172 lb) bout; Njokuani missed weight. Accidental elbow to spine rendered Heatherly unable to continue.
Win	10–4	LeVon Maynard	TKO (punches)	ShinZo Fight Sport 1	August 16, 2013	1	4:40	Guatemala City, Guatemala	
Loss	9–4	Jeremy Kimball	Submission (rear-naked choke)	RFA 7	March 22, 2013	2	1:51	Denver, Colorado, United States	Catchweight (180 lb) bout.
Win	9–3	Phil Dace	TKO (punches)	RFA 4	November 2, 2012	3	0:41	Las Vegas, Nevada, United States	
Win	8–3	Bobby Cooper	Decision (unanimous)	RFA 3	June 30, 2012	3	5:00	Kearney, Nebraska, United States	
Win	7–3	John Reedy	TKO (leg kick)	Tachi Palace Fights 13	May 10, 2012	1	0:55	Lemoore, California, United States	Catchweight (173.6 lb) bout; Njokuani missed weight.
Win	6–3	Jon Harris	TKO (knee and punches)	Legacy FC 10	February 24, 2012	1	1:54	Houston, Texas, United States	
Loss	5–3	Brandon Thatch	TKO (punches)	Ring of Fire 41	August 20, 2011	1	0:53	Broomfield, Colorado, United States	Catchweight (173 lb) bout.
Win	5–2	Alan Jouban	TKO (body kick)	Tachi Palace Fights 9	May 6, 2011	3	1:27	Lemoore, California, United States	Welterweight debut.
Win	4–2	Jack Montgomery	Submission (guillotine choke)	KOTC: Infusion	November 13, 2010	1	1:35	Las Vegas, Nevada, United States	
Win	3–2	Chris Kennedy	KO (punches)	MMA Xplosion: Vianna vs. Lacy	July 31, 2010	1	0:52	Las Vegas, Nevada, United States	
Loss	2–2	Jorge Lopez	TKO (punches)	MMA Xplosion: Next Generation Fighter	May 22, 2010	1	4:15	Las Vegas, Nevada, United States	
Loss	2–1	Warren Thompson	Submission (keylock)	Bangkok Fight Night 3	September 24, 2009	1	1:05	Atlanta, Georgia, United States	
Win	2–0	Andrew Moncriefe	TKO (punches)	Supreme Warrior Championship 1	September 19, 2008	1	0:22	Frisco, Texas, United States	
Win	1–0	Jorge Cortez	TKO (punches)	Fight Time Productions: Global Showdown	November 3, 2007	1	1:30	Thackerville, Oklahoma, United States	Middleweight debut.

== Kickboxing record (incomplete) ==
Professional kickboxing record
0 wins, 2 loss, 1 draw
Date	Result	Opponent	Event	Location	Method	Round	Time	Record
2013-9-28	Draw	(Canada) Simon Marcus	Push Kick Promotions: Muay Thai World Stand Off 5	Las Vegas, Nevada, US	Decision (majority)	3	3:00	0–2–1
2009-4-25	Loss	(United States) Joe Schilling	Dominant Knockout 1	Irving, Texas, US	Decision (unanimous)	5	3:00	0-2
2008-5-3	Loss	(United States) Raymond Daniels	World Combat League	Oklahoma, USA	Decision (18-6)	1	3:00	0-1

== See also ==
- List of current UFC fighters
- List of Dana White's Contender Series alumni
- List of male mixed martial artists
