= UFC Fight Night: Lemos vs. Andrade =

Mixed martial arts event in 2022

- The poster for UFC Fight Night: Lemos vs. Andrade
- Promotion: Ultimate Fighting Championship
- Date: April 23, 2022
- Venue: UFC Apex
- City: Enterprise, Nevada, United States
- Attendance: Not announced

Event chronology
| UFC on ESPN: Luque vs. Muhammad 2 | UFC Fight Night: Lemos vs. Andrade | UFC on ESPN: Font vs. Vera |

UFC Fight Night: Lemos vs. Andrade (also known as UFC Fight Night 205 and UFC on ESPN+ 63 or UFC Vegas 52) was a mixed martial arts event produced by the Ultimate Fighting Championship that took place on April 23, 2022, at the UFC Apex facility in Enterprise, Nevada, part of the Las Vegas Metropolitan Area, United States.

== Background ==
A women's strawweight bout between former UFC Women's Strawweight Champion Jéssica Andrade and Amanda Lemos headlined the event.

A women's flyweight bout between Montana De La Rosa and Maycee Barber was expected to take place at UFC 269, but it was postponed due to De La Rosa getting injured. They met at this event instead.

A heavyweight bout between Tanner Boser and Rodrigo Nascimento was scheduled for the event. However, Nascimento withdrew from the event for unknown reasons and was replaced by Alexander Romanov. In turn, Boser tweeted on April 18 that he was out of the fight due to an injury. He was replaced by Chase Sherman. Subsequently, Sherman was deemed unable to compete due to a minor health issue on the day of the event and the fight was pushed back a week.

A middleweight bout between Jordan Wright and Roman Kopylov was expected for the event. However, Kopylov withdrew for medical reasons and was replaced by Marc-André Barriault in a catchweight of 190 pounds.

Damir Hadžović was expected to meet Steve Garcia in a lightweight bout at the event. However, Hadžović pulled out due to alleged visa issues which restricted his travel.

Louis Cosce and Preston Parsons were expected to meet in a welterweight bout at the event. However, Cosce announced his withdrawal from the event on April 16 after testing positive for COVID-19. He was replaced by Evan Elder.

A flyweight bout between former Rizin Bantamweight Champion Manel Kape and Su Mudaerji was expected to take place at the event. However, just two days before the event, Kape withdrew for personal reasons and the bout was scrapped.

== Results ==
Main card (ESPN+)
| Weight class | | | | Method | Round | Time | Notes |
|---|---|---|---|---|---|---|---|
| Women's Strawweight | Jéssica Andrade | def. | Amanda Lemos | Submission (standing arm-triangle choke) | 1 | 3:13 |
| Lightweight | Claudio Puelles | def. | Clay Guida | Submission (kneebar) | 1 | 3:01 |
| Women's Flyweight | Maycee Barber | def. | Montana De La Rosa | Decision (unanimous) (30–27, 30–27, 30–27) | 3 | 5:00 |
| Featherweight | Charles Jourdain | def. | Lando Vannata | Submission (guillotine choke) | 1 | 2:32 |
| Catchweight (190 lb) | Marc-André Barriault | def. | Jordan Wright | Submission (guillotine choke) | 1 | 2:36 |
Preliminary card (ESPN+)
| Welterweight | Sergey Khandozhko | def. | Dwight Grant | TKO (punches) | 2 | 4:15 |
| Light Heavyweight | Tyson Pedro | def. | Ike Villanueva | KO (leg kick and punches) | 1 | 4:55 |
| Bantamweight | Aori Qileng | def. | Cameron Else | TKO (punches) | 1 | 2:48 |
| Welterweight | Preston Parsons | def. | Evan Elder | Decision (unanimous) (30–26, 30–27, 30–27) | 3 | 5:00 |
| Light Heavyweight | Philipe Lins | def. | Marcin Prachnio | Decision (unanimous) (29–28, 29–28, 29–28) | 3 | 5:00 |
| Welterweight | Mike Jackson | def. | Dean Barry | DQ (eye gouging) | 1 | 3:52 |

== Bonus awards ==
The following fighters received $50,000 bonuses.

- Fight of the Night: Sergey Khandozhko vs. Dwight Grant
- Performance of the Night: Jéssica Andrade and Claudio Puelles

== See also ==
- List of UFC events
- List of current UFC fighters
- 2022 in UFC
