= Anthony Hernandez =

American mixed martial artist (born 1993)

- Born: October 18, 1993 (age 33); Dunnigan, California, U.S.
- Nickname: Fluffy
- Height: 6 ft 0 in (1.83 m)
- Weight: 185 lb (84 kg; 13 st 3 lb)
- Division: Middleweight
- Reach: 75 in (191 cm)
- Stance: Orthodox
- Fighting out of: El Dorado Hills, California, U.S.
- Team: MMA Gold; Marinoble's Martial Arts
- Rank: Brown belt in Brazilian Jiu-Jitsu; Black belt in Marinoble's MMA System
- Years active: 2014–present

Mixed martial arts record
- Total: 20
- Wins: 15
- By knockout: 3
- By submission: 9
- By decision: 3
- Losses: 4
- By knockout: 2
- By submission: 1
- By decision: 1
- No contests: 1

Amateur record
- Total: 10
- Wins: 9
- By knockout: 4
- By submission: 3
- Losses: 1
- By submission: 1

Other information
- Mixed martial arts record from Sherdog

Anthony Hernandez (born October 18, 1993) is an American professional mixed martial artist currently competing in the Middleweight division of the Ultimate Fighting Championship (UFC). A professional since 2014, he has also competed with Global Knockout and Legacy Fighting Alliance. As of September 12, 2026, he is #8 in the Meta UFC middleweight rankings.

== Background ==
Hernandez was born in Dunnigan, California, on October 18, 1993, into a Mexican family. He graduated from Woodland High School in 2011. He wrestled in high school but got kicked off of the team due to grades. He attended college for a short time but dropped out to pursue a career in mixed martial arts.

== Mixed martial arts career ==
=== Amateur career ===
Hernandez made his amateur debut in 2010 during Ring of Fire 1, when he faced Michael Green Jr. He won the fight via unanimous decision. This would be the first win of an eight fight winning streak, which ended in a chance to fight for the King of the Cage Amateur Middleweight title, against Justin Jones. Hernandez lost the fight by submission in the first round.

=== Early career ===
In 2018, during LFA 32, Hernandez fought for the Legacy Fighting Alliance Middleweight title against Brendan Allen. Hernandez won a unanimous decision.

Fighting under the banner of Dana White's Contender Series 10, Hernandez faced Jordan Wright. Despite winning the fight in 40 seconds via knockout, the fight would be declared a no contest, as Hernandez tested positive for marijuana. He was penalized 15% of his purse and suspended for 6 months.

=== Ultimate Fighting Championship ===
Hernandez made his UFC debut on February 2, 2019, at UFC Fight Night 144 when he faced Markus Perez. He lost in the second round, by anaconda choke.

Hernandez faced Jun Yong Park on August 31, 2019, at UFC Fight Night 157. He won this fight by anaconda choke.

Hernandez faced Kevin Holland on May 16, 2020, at UFC on ESPN 8. He lost the fight after just 39 seconds, by TKO.

Hernandez was scheduled to face five-time Jiu-Jitsu World Champion Rodolfo Vieira on January 16, 2021, at UFC on ABC 1. However, Hernandez pulled out due to a positive COVID-19 test and they were rescheduled for UFC 258 on February 13, 2021. Hernandez won the fight via a guillotine choke in round two in a huge upset. This win earned him the Performance of the Night award.

Hernandez was scheduled to face Punahele Soriano on June 26, 2021, at UFC Fight Night 190. However, Hernandez was pulled from the event due to injury and was replaced by Brendan Allen at UFC Fight Night 192.

Hernandez was scheduled to face Dustin Stoltzfus on December 18, 2021, at UFC Fight Night 199. However, Hernandez withdrew from the event due to undisclosed reasons and was replaced by newcomer Caio Borralho.

Hernandez was scheduled to face Albert Duraev on April 9, 2022, at UFC 273. However, due to a rib injury, Duraev was pull from the event and he was replaced by Dricus du Plessis. Du Plessis was eventually moved to another matchup on the card and Hernandez was instead booked against Josh Fremd. He won the fight via unanimous decision.

Hernandez faced Marc-André Barriault on September 17, 2022 at UFC Fight Night 210. He won the fight via a submission in round three.

Hernandez faced Edmen Shahbazyan on May 20, 2023 at UFC Fight Night 223. He won the fight via technical knockout in round three.

Hernandez was scheduled to face Chris Curtis at UFC Fight Night 227 on September 16, 2023. However, Curtis withdrew due to a rib injury and was replaced by Roman Kopylov. In turn, Hernandez pulled out of the bout due to a torn ligament and was replaced by Josh Fremd.

Hernandez was scheduled to face Ikram Aliskerov on February 17, 2024, at UFC 298. However Aliskerov withdrew due to compilations related to illness and was replaced by Roman Kopylov. In a competitive bout, Hernandez won by a rear-naked choke submission in the second round. This fight earned him another Performance of the Night award.

Hernandez was scheduled to face Roman Dolidze on June 1, 2024 at UFC 302. However Hernandez was forced out of the bout due to a torn ligament in his hand.

Hernandez was scheduled to face Michel Pereira on September 14, 2024 at UFC 306. However, the bout was rescheduled to October 19, 2024 to serve as the main event at UFC Fight Night 245. Hernandez won the fight by technical knockout as a result of significant control time and ground strikes in the fifth round. This fight earned him another Performance of the Night award.

Hernandez faced former LFA Middleweight Champion Brendan Allen in a rematch on February 22, 2025 at UFC Fight Night 252. He won the fight by unanimous decision.

Hernandez' bout with Roman Dolidze was rescheduled and took place on August 9, 2025 in the main event at UFC on ESPN 72. He won the fight via a rear-naked choke submission in the fourth round. This fight earned him another Performance of the Night award.

Hernandez was scheduled to face former ONE Middleweight and Light Heavyweight World Champion Reinier de Ridder on October 18, 2025 at UFC Fight Night 262. However, Hernandez was forced to withdraw from the bout due to an injury and was replaced by Brendan Allen.

Hernandez faced former UFC Middleweight Champion Sean Strickland in the main event on February 21, 2026 at UFC Fight Night 267. He lost the fight by technical knockout in the third round, ending his eight‑fight win streak.

Hernandez faced fellow former LFA Middleweight Champion Gregory Rodrigues in the main event on August 22, 2026 at UFC Fight Night 285. He lost the fight via unanimous decision. This fight earned him his first $100,000 Fight of the Night award.

== Personal life ==
Hernandez has four children. Hernandez's father died due to lung disease in March 2018; in a June 2018 interview, he referred to his late father as his best friend.

== Championships and accomplishments ==
- Ultimate Fighting Championship
  - Fight of the Night (One time) vs. Gregory Rodrigues
  - Performance of the Night (Four times) vs. Rodolfo Vieira, Roman Kopylov, Michel Pereira and Roman Dolidze
  - Most takedowns landed in UFC Middleweight division history (57)
  - Third highest significant strike accuracy percentage in UFC Middleweight division history (60.1%)
  - Tied (Robert Whittaker & Yoel Romero) for fifth longest win streak in UFC Middleweight division history (8)
  - Fifth most submission attempts in UFC Middleweight division history (15)
  - Second most control time in UFC Middleweight division history (1:22:25) (behind Chael Sonnen)
  - Sixth most top position time in UFC Middleweight division history (55:33)
  - UFC Records in a Middleweight Bout:
    - Most significant ground strikes landed (97) (vs. Michel Pereira)
    - Most takedowns attempted (29) (vs. Michel Pereira)
    - Largest striking differential (+128) (vs. Michel Pereira)
    - Latest knockout (2:22 in R5) (vs. Michel Pereira)
  - UFC Honors Awards
    - 2021: Fan's Choice Comeback of the Year Nominee vs. Rodolfo Vieira
  - UFC.com Awards
    - 2021: Ranked #2 Submission of the Year, Ranked #2 Upset of the Year, & Half-Year Awards: Biggest Upset of the 1HY vs. Rodolfo Vieira
    - 2024: Ranked #6 Submission of the Year vs. Roman Kopylov
    - 2025: Ranked #4 Submission of the Year vs. Roman Dolidze
- Legacy Fighting Alliance
  - LFA Middleweight Championship
- Sherdog
  - 2024 Beatdown of the Year vs. Michel Pereira at UFC Fight Night 245
  - 2025 Beatdown of the Year vs. Roman Dolidze at UFC on ESPN 72
- MMA Mania
  - 2025 Submission of the Year vs. Roman Dolidze
- Cageside Press
  - 2021 Submission of the Year vs. Rodolfo Vieira
- Jitsmagazine
  - 2021 MMA Submission of the Year vs. Rodolfo Vieira
- Combat Press
  - 2021 MMA Submission of the Year vs. Rodolfo Vieira
- MMA Sucka
  - 2021 Submission of the Year vs. Rodolfo Vieira at UFC 258

== Mixed martial arts record ==
Professional record breakdown
20 matches	15 wins	4 losses
By knockout	3	2
By submission	9	1
By decision	3	1
No contests	1	

Res.	Record	Opponent	Method	Event	Date	Round	Time	Location	Notes
Loss	15–4 (1)	Gregory Rodrigues	Decision (unanimous)	UFC Fight Night: Hernandez vs. Rodrigues	August 22, 2026	5	5:00	Sacramento, California, United States	Fight of the Night.
Loss	15–3 (1)	Sean Strickland	TKO (punches)	UFC Fight Night: Strickland vs. Hernandez	February 21, 2026	3	2:23	Houston, Texas, United States	
Win	15–2 (1)	Roman Dolidze	Submission (rear-naked choke)	UFC on ESPN: Dolidze vs. Hernandez	August 9, 2025	4	2:45	Las Vegas, Nevada, United States	Performance of the Night.
Win	14–2 (1)	Brendan Allen	Decision (unanimous)	UFC Fight Night: Cejudo vs. Song	February 22, 2025	3	5:00	Seattle, Washington, United States	
Win	13–2 (1)	Michel Pereira	TKO (elbows)	UFC Fight Night: Hernandez vs. Pereira	October 19, 2024	5	2:22	Las Vegas, Nevada, United States	Performance of the Night.
Win	12–2 (1)	Roman Kopylov	Submission (rear-naked choke)	UFC 298	February 17, 2024	2	3:23	Anaheim, California, United States	Performance of the Night.
Win	11–2 (1)	Edmen Shahbazyan	TKO (elbows and punches)	UFC Fight Night: Dern vs. Hill	May 20, 2023	3	1:01	Las Vegas, Nevada, United States	
Win	10–2 (1)	Marc-André Barriault	Technical Submission (arm-triangle choke)	UFC Fight Night: Sandhagen vs. Song	September 17, 2022	3	1:53	Las Vegas, Nevada, United States	
Win	9–2 (1)	Josh Fremd	Decision (unanimous)	UFC 273	April 9, 2022	3	5:00	Jacksonville, Florida, United States	
Win	8–2 (1)	Rodolfo Vieira	Submission (guillotine choke)	UFC 258	February 13, 2021	2	1:53	Las Vegas, Nevada, United States	Performance of the Night.
Loss	7–2 (1)	Kevin Holland	TKO (knees and punches)	UFC on ESPN: Overeem vs. Harris	May 16, 2020	1	0:39	Jacksonville, Florida, United States	
Win	7–1 (1)	Park Jun-yong	Submission (anaconda choke)	UFC Fight Night: Andrade vs. Zhang	August 31, 2019	2	4:39	Shenzhen, China	
Loss	6–1 (1)	Markus Perez	Submission (anaconda choke)	UFC Fight Night: Assunção vs. Moraes 2	February 2, 2019	2	1:07	Fortaleza, Brazil	
NC	6–0 (1)	Jordan Wright	NC (overturned)	Dana White's Contender Series 10	June 19, 2018	1	0:40	Las Vegas, Nevada, United States	Originally a KO (punches) win for Hernandez; overturned after he tested positive for marijuana.
Win	6–0	Brendan Allen	Decision (unanimous)	LFA 32	January 26, 2018	5	5:00	Lake Charles, Louisiana, United States	Won the vacant LFA Middleweight Championship.
Win	5–0	Mike Persons	Submission (guillotine choke)	Global Knockout 9	March 18, 2017	1	1:54	Jackson, California, United States	
Win	4–0	Jumoke Hunter	Submission (guillotine choke)	Global Knockout 7	August 27, 2016	1	3:09	Jackson, California, United States	
Win	3–0	Preston Snook	Submission (guillotine choke)	Global Knockout 4	August 29, 2015	1	1:45	Jackson, California, United States	
Win	2–0	Kenny Ento	Submission (guillotine choke)	Global Knockout 3	March 21, 2015	1	3:30	Jackson, California, United States	
Win	1–0	Trey Williams	KO (punch)	West Coast FC 11	September 13, 2014	1	0:51	Sacramento, California, United States	Middleweight debut.

== Amateur mixed martial arts record ==
Amateur record breakdown		
8 matches	7 wins	1 loss
By knockout	3	0
By submission	3	1
By decision	1	0

Res.	Record	Opponent	Method	Event	Date	Round	Time	Location	Notes
Win	7–1	Eric Smith	Submission (armbar)	West Coast FC 5	May 3, 2013	2	0:43	Sacramento, California, United States	
Loss	6–1	Justin Jones	Submission (rear-naked choke)	KOTC: Fighting Legends	April 13, 2013	1	1:42	Sacramento, California, United States	For the KOTC Middleweight title.
Win	6–0	Matt Wilson	TKO (punches)	West Coast FC 4	January 18, 2013	1	N/A	Sacramento, California, United States	
Win	5–0	Blake Smee	TKO (punches)	Ultimate Reno Combat 35	July 20, 2012	3	1:11	Reno, Nevada, United States	
Win	4-0	Randall Wallace	Submission (rear-naked choke)	Ultimate Reno Combat 33	May 18, 2012	2	1:48	Reno, Nevada, United States	
Win	3–0	Albert Townsend	Submission (triangle choke)	Ultimate Reno Combat: Fight Factory at the Knit 1	March 23, 2012	1	1:01	Reno, Nevada, United States	
Win	2–0	Mike Ramos	KO (knee to the body)	Ultimate Reno Combat 28	October 21, 2011	2	1:51	Reno, Nevada, United States	
Win	1–0	Michael Green Jr.	Decision (unanimous)	Ring of Fire 1	June 25, 2010	3	2:00	Arcadia, California, United States	

== See also ==
- List of current UFC fighters
- List of Dana White's Contender Series alumni
- List of male mixed martial artists
