= Jordan Wright =

American mixed martial arts fighter

- Born: October 7, 1991 (age 35); Edmonton, AB, Canada
- Other names: The Beverly Hills Ninja
- Height: 6 ft 1 in (1.85 m)
- Weight: 205 lb (93 kg; 14 st 9 lb)
- Division: Light Heavyweight; Middleweight
- Reach: 77 in (196 cm)
- Stance: Orthodox
- Fighting out of: Los Angeles, California
- Team: Dynamix MMA
- Rank: Brown belt in karate Brown ekot in pencak silat
- Years active: 2014–present

Mixed martial arts record
- Total: 20
- Wins: 14
- By knockout: 8
- By submission: 5
- By decision: 1
- Losses: 5
- By knockout: 3
- By submission: 1
- By decision: 1
- No contests: 1

Other information
- Mixed martial arts record from Sherdog

Jordan Wright (born October 7, 1991) is an American mixed martial artist who competes in the Middleweight division. He formerly fought in the Ultimate Fighting Championship.

== Background ==
Wright started gymnastics at age four, but after watching the anime Dragon Ball Z, he developed an interest in martial arts. Trying karate as his first martial art, he would then try his hand in wushu, Muay Thai and kickboxing. After participating in some Muay Thai smokers at the age of 16, he was instantly hooked. After high school, Wright decided to make fighting a full-time job and moved to New Mexico and tried out for Jackson-Wink MMA. After passing the tryout, Wright would sleep and live at the gym during the summer before his freshman year at the University of New Mexico.

Wright has trained and competed in catch wrestling. He was the runner-up in the -214 lb. division at the ACWA US Open national championships in December 2023.

== Mixed martial arts career ==
=== Early career ===
Soon after graduating from college, Wright made his professional MMA debut at 23 years old under the banner of Xplode Fight Series. He was victorious, submitting John Lee with a rear-naked choke in just 63 seconds. Wright would go on to win his next seven bouts, none lasting longer than 2:48. At LFA 30 on January 12, 2018, Wright submitted Craig Wilkerson in 1 minute and 29 seconds.

Fighting under the banner of Dana White's Contender Series 10, he faced Anthony Hernandez. Despite losing the fight in 40 seconds, the fight would be declared a no contest, as Hernandez tested positive for marijuana.

Wright faced Gabriel Checco at LFA 80 on January 17, 2020. He won the bout via TKO in the second round.

=== Ultimate Fighting Championship ===
Wright made his UFC debut on short notice, as a replacement for Jorge Gonzalez, against Ike Villanueva on August 22, 2020, at UFC on ESPN: Munhoz vs. Edgar. Wright won after cutting Isaac badly with a knee, leading to a doctor's stoppage.

Wright faced Joaquin Buckley at UFC 255 on November 21, 2020. He lost the fight via knockout in round two.

Wright faced Jamie Pickett on May 15, 2021, at UFC 262. He won the bout via TKO in the first round.

Wright was scheduled to face Julian Marquez on October 16, 2021, at UFC Fight Night 195. At the weigh-ins, it was announced that Marquez was pulled from the bout due to non-COVID related health issues and the fight was canceled.

Wright faced Bruno Silva on December 11, 2021, at UFC 269. He lost the fight via TKO in the first round.

Wright was scheduled to face Roman Kopylov on April 23, 2022, at UFC Fight Night 205. However Kopylov withdrew for medical reasons and he was replaced by Marc-André Barriault. Wright lost the fight via a guillotine choke in round one.

Wright faced Duško Todorović on October 15, 2022, at UFC Fight Night 212. He lost the fight via technical knockout in round two. This fight earned him the Fight of the Night award.

Wright faced Zac Pauga on February 18, 2023, at UFC Fight Night 219. He lost the fight via unanimous decision.

After the loss, it was announced that Wright was no longer on the UFC roster.

=== Post-UFC Career ===
In his first fight outside the UFC, Wright faced Dana White's Contender Series veteran Zack Borrego in the main event of Fury FC 88 on March 24, 2024. He won the fight via unanimous decision.

== Championships and accomplishments ==
=== Catch wrestling ===
- American Catch Wrestling Association
  - 2023 US Open - 2nd place, -214 lbs.

=== Mixed martial arts ===
- Ultimate Fighting Championship
  - Fight of the Night (One time) vs. Duško Todorović

== Mixed martial arts record ==
Professional record breakdown
20 matches	14 wins	5 losses
By knockout	8	3
By submission	5	1
By decision	1	1
No contests	1	

Res.	Record	Opponent	Method	Event	Date	Round	Time	Location	Notes
Win	14–5 (1)	Yuta Watanabe	TKO (head kick and punches)	NEXUS Mania 2026: 2nd Round	July 3, 2026	1	2:44	Tokyo, Japan	
Win	13–5 (1)	Zack Borrego	Decision (unanimous)	Fury FC 88	March 24, 2024	5	5:00	San Antonio, Texas, United States	
Loss	12–5 (1)	Zac Pauga	Decision (unanimous)	UFC Fight Night: Andrade vs. Blanchfield	February 18, 2023	3	5:00	Las Vegas, Nevada, United States	Light Heavyweight bout.
Loss	12–4 (1)	Duško Todorović	TKO (punches and elbows)	UFC Fight Night: Grasso vs. Araújo	October 15, 2022	2	3:12	Las Vegas, Nevada, United States	Fight of the Night.
Loss	12–3 (1)	Marc-André Barriault	Submission (guillotine choke)	UFC Fight Night: Lemos vs. Andrade	April 23, 2022	1	2:36	Las Vegas, Nevada, United States	Catchweight (190 lb) bout.
Loss	12–2 (1)	Bruno Silva	TKO (punches)	UFC 269	December 11, 2021	1	1:28	Las Vegas, Nevada, United States	
Win	12–1 (1)	Jamie Pickett	TKO (elbows and punches)	UFC 262	May 15, 2021	1	1:04	Houston, Texas, United States	
Loss	11–1 (1)	Joaquin Buckley	KO (punches)	UFC 255	November 21, 2020	2	0:18	Las Vegas, Nevada, United States	
Win	11–0 (1)	Ike Villanueva	TKO (doctor stoppage)	UFC on ESPN: Munhoz vs. Edgar	August 22, 2020	1	1:31	Las Vegas, Nevada, United States	Light Heavyweight bout.
Win	10–0 (1)	Gabriel Checco	TKO (knee and punches)	LFA 80	January 17, 2020	2	0:48	Albuquerque, New Mexico, United States	
NC	9–0 (1)	Anthony Hernandez	NC (overturned)	Dana White's Contender Series 10	June 19, 2018	1	0:40	Las Vegas, Nevada, United States	Originally a KO (punches) win for Hernandez; overturned after he tested positive for marijuana.
Win	9–0	Craig Wilkerson	Submission (rear-naked choke)	LFA 30	January 12, 2018	1	1:29	Costa Mesa, California, United States	
Win	8–0	John Stern	Submission (rear-naked choke)	Alaska FC 131	April 19, 2017	1	2:03	Anchorage, Alaska, United States	Return to Middleweight.
Win	7–0	John Stern	Submission (arm-triangle choke)	Alaska FC 128	January 18, 2017	1	1:32	Anchorage, Alaska, United States	Light Heavyweight debut.
Win	6–0	Julian Hernandez	TKO (punches)	Gladiator Challenge: Young Gunz	January 30, 2016	1	0:39	San Jacinto, California, United States	
Win	5–0	Edward Darby	TKO (spinning back kick)	Xplode Fight Series: Payback	September 19, 2015	1	0:10	Valley Center, California, United States	
Win	4–0	Andrew Wright	TKO (punches)	Xplode Fight Series: Heat	July 11, 2015	1	1:59	Valley Center, California, United States	
Win	3–0	Toby O'Neil	TKO (leg kicks)	Xplode Fight Series: Taco	March 21, 2015	1	0:52	Valley Center, California, United States	
Win	2–0	Ramon Dawson	Submission (rear-naked choke)	Xplode Fight Series: Hurricane Pro	January 17, 2015	1	2:48	Valley Center, California, United States	
Win	1–0	John Lee	Submission (rear-naked choke)	Xplode Fight Series: Wasteland	November 8, 2014	1	1:03	Valley Center, California, United States	Middleweight debut.

== See also ==
- List of current UFC fighters
- List of male mixed martial artists
