= UFC Fight Night: Sandhagen vs. Song =

Mixed martial arts event in 2022

- The poster for UFC Fight Night: Sandhagen vs. Song
- Promotion: Ultimate Fighting Championship
- Date: September 17, 2022
- Venue: UFC Apex
- City: Enterprise, Nevada, United States
- Attendance: Not announced

Event chronology
UFC 279: Diaz vs. Ferguson	UFC Fight Night: Sandhagen vs. Song	UFC Fight Night: Dern vs. Yan

UFC Fight Night: Sandhagen vs. Song (also known as UFC Fight Night 210, UFC on ESPN+ 68 and UFC Vegas 60) was a mixed martial arts event produced by the Ultimate Fighting Championship that took place on September 17, 2022, at the UFC Apex facility in Enterprise, Nevada, part of the Las Vegas Metropolitan Area, United States.

== Background ==
A bantamweight bout between former interim UFC Bantamweight Championship challenger Cory Sandhagen and Song Yadong headlined the event.

A trio of bouts was originally scheduled for UFC 279, but they were eventually pushed back a week to this event as the promotion adjusted its schedule in June: lightweight bouts featuring Trey Ogden vs. Daniel Zellhuber and Nikolas Motta vs. Cameron VanCamp; as well as a welterweight bout between Louis Cosce and Trevin Giles.

A women's flyweight bout between Sijara Eubanks and Maryna Moroz was scheduled for UFC on ESPN: dos Anjos vs. Fiziev. However, the pair was moved to this event for undisclosed reasons. In early September, the promotion opted to rebooked Moroz against Jennifer Maia at UFC Fight Night 215 after Eubanks pulled out due to undisclosed reasons.

A women's flyweight bout between Gillian Robertson and Melissa Gatto was expected to take place at the event. However, Gatto was removed from the event for undisclosed reasons and replaced by Mariya Agapova.

A women's bantamweight bout featuring Aspen Ladd and 2004 Olympic silver medalist in wrestling and former UFC Women's Bantamweight Championship challenger Sara McMann was expected to take place at the event. They were originally supposed to fight at UFC on ESPN: Poirier vs. Hooker in June 2020 and UFC on ESPN: Vera vs. Cruz in August 2022, but Ladd was forced to withdraw from both occasions after tearing both her anterior cruciate ligament (ACL) and medial collateral ligament (MCL) in training and testing positive for COVID-19 respectively. At the weigh-ins, Ladd weighed in at 138 pounds, two pounds over the bantamweight non-title fight limit, and as a result the bout was scrapped.

Lando Vannata and Andre Fili were scheduled to meet in a featherweight bout at the event. However, Vannata withdrew due to injury. Fili faced Bill Algeo instead.

A women's strawweight bout between Loma Lookboonmee and Diana Belbiţă was expected to take place at the event. However, Belbiţă withdraw due to undisclosed reasons and was replaced by Denise Gomes.

A featherweight bout between Giga Chikadze and Sodiq Yusuff was expected to take place at the event. However, the week before the event, Chikadze withdrew due to injury. The promotion opted to cancel the contest and rebook Yusuff against Don Shainis two weeks later at UFC Fight Night: Dern vs. Yan.

== Results ==
Main card (ESPN+)
Weight class				Method	Round	Time	Notes
Bantamweight	Cory Sandhagen	def.	Song Yadong	TKO (doctor stoppage)	4	5:00
Middleweight	Gregory Rodrigues	def.	Chidi Njokuani	TKO (punches)	2	1:27
Featherweight	Andre Fili	def.	Bill Algeo	Decision (split) (28–29, 29–28, 29–28)	3	5:00
Middleweight	Joe Pyfer	def.	Alen Amedovski	TKO (punches)	1	3:55
Heavyweight	Rodrigo Nascimento	def.	Tanner Boser	Decision (split) (30–27, 28–29, 29–28)	3	5:00
Middleweight	Anthony Hernandez	def.	Marc-André Barriault	Technical Submission (arm-triangle choke)	3	1:53
Preliminary card (ESPN+)
Featherweight	Damon Jackson	def.	Pat Sabatini	TKO (punches)	1	1:09
Welterweight	Trevin Giles	def.	Louis Cosce	Decision (unanimous) (30–27, 29–28, 29–28)	3	5:00
Women's Strawweight	Loma Lookboonmee	def.	Denise Gomes	Decision (unanimous) (30–27, 30–27, 29–28)	3	5:00
Lightweight	Trey Ogden	def.	Daniel Zellhuber	Decision (unanimous) (30–27, 30–27, 29–28)	3	5:00
Women's Flyweight	Gillian Robertson	def.	Mariya Agapova	Technical Submission (rear-naked choke)	2	2:19
Bantamweight	Javid Basharat	def.	Tony Gravely	Decision (unanimous) (29–28, 29–28, 29–28)	3	5:00
Lightweight	Nikolas Motta	def.	Cameron VanCamp	TKO (punches)	1	3:49

== Bonus awards ==
The following fighters received $50,000 bonuses.

- Fight of the Night: Gregory Rodrigues vs. Chidi Njokuani
- Performance of the Night: Joe Pyfer and Damon Jackson

== See also ==
- List of UFC events
- List of current UFC fighters
- 2022 in UFC
