= Krzysztof Jotko =

Polish mixed martial arts fighter

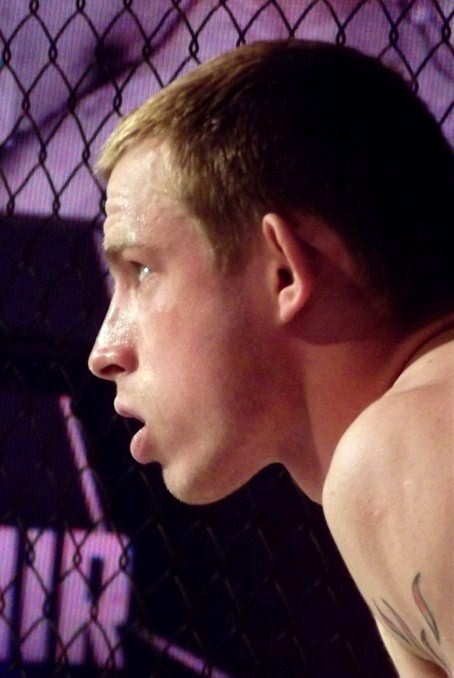
- Born: August 19, 1989 (age 37); Elbląg, Poland
- Height: 6 ft 1 in (1.85 m)
- Weight: 205 lb (93 kg; 14.6 st)
- Division: Middleweight; Welterweight
- Reach: 77 in (196 cm)
- Fighting out of: Orneta, Poland
- Team: Phuket Top Team; American Top Team (2016–present)
- Rank: Brown belt in Brazilian Jiu-Jitsu
- Years active: 2010–present

Mixed martial arts record
- Total: 37
- Wins: 30
- By knockout: 8
- By submission: 2
- By decision: 20
- Losses: 6
- By knockout: 2
- By submission: 2
- By decision: 2
- No contests: 1

Other information
- Mixed martial arts record from Sherdog

Krzysztof Jotko (born August 19, 1989) is a Polish mixed martial artist currently competing in Oktagon MMA where he is the Middleweight champion. He has previously fought in the Ultimate Fighting Championship and Professional Fighters League (PFL).

== Background ==
Born and raised in Orneta, Poland, Jotko was originally a breakdancer. He started training mixed martial arts after seeing one of the Tito Ortiz vs. Ken Shamrock bouts in TV. After finishing school, he moved to Warsaw where he continued training for his amateur career in the sport. He is married and lives in South Florida with his wife Amanda Hernandez, a nurse.

== Mixed martial arts career ==
=== Early career ===
Jotko faced Bojan Veličković at MMA Attack 3 on April 27, 2013. He won the via majority decision, in a fight that earned both fighters "Fight of the Night" honors.

=== Ultimate Fighting Championship ===
Jotko made his promotional debut facing Bruno Santos at UFC Fight Night 33 on December 7, 2013. He won the fight via unanimous decision.

He then faced Magnus Cedenblad at UFC Fight Night 41 on May 31, 2014. Jotko lost the fight via guillotine choke submission, ending his undefeated streak.

Jotko faced Tor Troéng on October 4, 2014, at UFC Fight Night 53. He won the fight by unanimous decision.

Jotko was expected to face Derek Brunson on June 20, 2015, at UFC Fight Night 69. However, Brunson pulled out of the fight on June 9 citing a rib injury and was briefly replaced by Uriah Hall. Three days after the booking, Hall was removed due to an alleged visa issue. In turn, Jotko was removed from the card entirely.

Jotko faced Scott Askham on October 24, 2015, at UFC Fight Night 76. He won the fight by split decision.

Jotko faced Brad Scott on February 27, 2016, at UFC Fight Night 84. He won the fight by unanimous decision.

Jotko next faced Tamdan McCrory on June 18, 2016, at UFC Fight Night 89. He won the fight via knockout in the first round and was awarded a Performance of the Night bonus.

Jotko faced Thales Leites on November 19, 2016, at UFC Fight Night 100. He won the fight via unanimous decision.

Jotko faced David Branch on May 13, 2017, at UFC 211. He lost the fight via split decision.

Jotko faced Uriah Hall on September 16, 2017, at UFC Fight Night 116. He lost the fight via KO in the second round.

Jotko faced Brad Tavares on April 14, 2018, at UFC on Fox 29. He lost the fight via technical knock out on round three.

Jotko was scheduled to face Adam Yandiev in September 2018, at UFC Fight Night 136. However, Jotko pulled out of the fight on August 16 citing injury and was replaced by Jordan Johnson.

Jotko was expected to face newcomer Roman Kopylov on April 20, 2019, at UFC Fight Night 149. However, Kopylov pulled out of the bout on March 22 citing injury and was replaced by Alen Amedovski. Jotko won the fight via unanimous decision.

Jotko faced Marc-André Barriault July 27, 2019, at UFC 240. He won the fight via split decision.

Jotko was expected to face Edmen Shahbazyan on November 2, 2019, at UFC 244. However, Jotko withdrew from the bout and was replaced by Brad Tavares.

Jotko was scheduled to face Eryk Anders on April 11, 2020, at UFC Fight Night: Overeem vs. Harris. Due to the COVID-19 pandemic, the event was eventually postponed to May 16, 2020, at UFC on ESPN: Overeem vs. Harris. He won the fight via unanimous decision.

Jotko was scheduled to face Makhmud Muradov on October 31, 2020, at UFC Fight Night 181. However, Jotko was pulled from the event, citing injury, and he was replaced by Kevin Holland.

Jotko faced Sean Strickland on May 1, 2021, at UFC on ESPN: Reyes vs. Procházka. He lost the bout via unanimous decision.

As the last fight of his prevailing contract, Jotko faced Misha Cirkunov on October 2, 2021, at UFC Fight Night 193. He won the fight via split decision.

Jotko faced Gerald Meerschaert on April 30, 2022, at UFC on ESPN 35. He won the bout via unanimous decision.

Jotko faced Brendan Allen on October 1, 2022, at UFC Fight Night: Dern vs. Yan. He lost the bout at the end of the first round, getting submitted via rear-naked choke.

After his loss, it was announced at the end of October that he was no longer on the UFC roster.

=== Professional Fighters League ===
Jotko started the 2023 season against Will Fleury on April 1, 2023, at PFL 1. He lost the bout via split decision. The result of the bout was later overturned to a no contest after Fluery tested positive for Drostanolone.

Jotko was scheduled to face Ty Flores on June 8, 2023, at PFL 4. On May 9, 2023, it was announced that Jotko had failed a commission drug test and was pulled from the season. At the NAC meeting that month, it was announced that Jotko was suspended 6 months for testing positive for Clomiphene. He was eligible to return on October 1, 2023.

=== Oktagon MMA ===
On December 28, 2024, it was reported that Jotko joined the Tipsport Gamechanger 3 tournament in a middleweight division.

In the opening rounds, Jotko faced Ion Surdu on April 26, 2025, at Oktagon 70. He won the fight via unanimous decision.

== Championships and accomplishments ==
=== Mixed martial arts ===
- MMA Attack
  - Fight of the Night (One time) vs. Bojan Veličković
- Ultimate Fighting Championship
  - Performance of the Night (One time) vs. Tamdan McCrory
  - Tied (Gray Maynard & JJ Aldrich) for third highest decision wins per win percentage in UFC History (10 decision wins / 11 wins: 90.7%)
  - Tied (Brad Tavares & Sean Strickland) for most split decision wins in UFC middleweight history (3)

== Mixed martial arts record ==
Professional record breakdown
37 matches	30 wins	6 losses
By knockout	8	2
By submission	2	2
By decision	20	2
No contests	1	

Res.	Record	Opponent	Method	Event	Date	Round	Time	Location	Notes
Win	30–6 (1)	Kerim Engizek	Decision (unanimous)	Oktagon 91	July 11, 2026	5	5:00	Cologne, Germany	Won the Oktagon Middleweight Championship. Engizek was deducted one point in round 3 due to grabbing the fence.
Win	29–6 (1)	Kerim Engizek	Submission (rear-naked choke)	Oktagon 82	January 17, 2026	1	3:37	Düsseldorf, Germany	Won the Oktagon Middleweight Tournament.
Win	28–6 (1)	Hojat Khajevand	Decision (unanimous)	Oktagon 77	October 4, 2025	3	5:00	Bratislava, Slovakia	Oktagon Middleweight Tournament Semifinal; Jotko missed weight (187 lb).
Win	27–6 (1)	Marek Mazúch	TKO (elbows)	Oktagon 74	August 9, 2025	2	4:36	Prague, Czech Republic	Oktagon Middleweight Tournament Quarterfinal; both fighters missed weight (191 lb).
Win	26–6 (1)	Ion Surdu	Decision (unanimous)	Oktagon 70	April 26, 2025	3	5:00	Karlovy Vary, Czech Republic	Oktagon Middleweight Tournament Round of 16.
Win	25–6 (1)	Andres Ramos	TKO (punches)	FNC 20	November 23, 2024	2	1:39	Zagreb, Croatia	Return to Middleweight.
NC	24–6 (1)	Will Fleury	NC (overturned)	PFL 1 (2023)	April 1, 2023	3	5:00	Las Vegas, Nevada, United States	Light Heavyweight debut. Originally a split decision win for Fleury; overturned after he tested positive for drostanolone.
Loss	24–6	Brendan Allen	Submission (rear-naked choke)	UFC Fight Night: Dern vs. Yan	October 1, 2022	1	4:17	Las Vegas, Nevada, United States	
Win	24–5	Gerald Meerschaert	Decision (unanimous)	UFC on ESPN: Font vs. Vera	April 30, 2022	3	5:00	Las Vegas, Nevada, United States	
Win	23–5	Misha Cirkunov	Decision (split)	UFC Fight Night: Santos vs. Walker	October 2, 2021	3	5:00	Las Vegas, Nevada, United States	
Loss	22–5	Sean Strickland	Decision (unanimous)	UFC on ESPN: Reyes vs. Procházka	May 1, 2021	3	5:00	Las Vegas, Nevada, United States	
Win	22–4	Eryk Anders	Decision (unanimous)	UFC on ESPN: Overeem vs. Harris	May 16, 2020	3	5:00	Jacksonville, Florida, United States	
Win	21–4	Marc-André Barriault	Decision (split)	UFC 240	July 27, 2019	3	5:00	Edmonton, Alberta, Canada	
Win	20–4	Alen Amedovski	Decision (unanimous)	UFC Fight Night: Overeem vs. Oleinik	April 20, 2019	3	5:00	Saint Petersburg, Russia	
Loss	19–4	Brad Tavares	TKO (punches)	UFC on Fox: Poirier vs. Gaethje	April 14, 2018	3	2:16	Glendale, Arizona, United States	
Loss	19–3	Uriah Hall	TKO (punches)	UFC Fight Night: Rockhold vs. Branch	September 16, 2017	2	2:25	Pittsburgh, Pennsylvania, United States	
Loss	19–2	David Branch	Decision (split)	UFC 211	May 13, 2017	3	5:00	Dallas, Texas, United States	
Win	19–1	Thales Leites	Decision (unanimous)	UFC Fight Night: Bader vs. Nogueira 2	November 19, 2016	3	5:00	São Paulo, Brazil	
Win	18–1	Tamdan McCrory	KO (punches)	UFC Fight Night: MacDonald vs. Thompson	June 18, 2016	1	0:59	Ottawa, Ontario, Canada	Performance of the Night.
Win	17–1	Brad Scott	Decision (unanimous)	UFC Fight Night: Silva vs. Bisping	February 27, 2016	3	5:00	London, England	
Win	16–1	Scott Askham	Decision (split)	UFC Fight Night: Holohan vs. Smolka	October 24, 2015	3	5:00	Dublin, Ireland	
Win	15–1	Tor Troéng	Decision (unanimous)	UFC Fight Night: Nelson vs. Story	October 4, 2014	3	5:00	Stockholm, Sweden	
Loss	14–1	Magnus Cedenblad	Submission (guillotine choke)	UFC Fight Night: Munoz vs. Mousasi	May 31, 2014	2	4:59	Berlin, Germany	
Win	14–0	Bruno Santos	Decision (unanimous)	UFC Fight Night: Hunt vs. Bigfoot	December 7, 2013	3	5:00	Brisbane, Australia	
Win	13–0	Bojan Veličković	Decision (majority)	MMA Attack 3	April 27, 2013	3	5:00	Katowice, Poland	Fight of the Night.
Win	12–0	Martin Zawada	Decision (split)	Fight Night Merseburg 5	September 8, 2012	3	5:00	Merseburg, Germany	
Win	11–0	Fabian Loewke	Submission (rear-naked choke)	Fight Night Merseburg 5	September 8, 2012	2	1:12	Merseburg, Germany	Return to Middleweight.
Win	10–0	Damir Hadžović	Decision (unanimous)	MMA Attack 2	April 27, 2012	3	5:00	Poznań, Poland	Welterweight debut.
Win	9–0	Tomasz Kondraciuk	TKO (submission to punches)	X Fight Series: Night of Champions 3	February 4, 2012	2	4:08	Międzychód, Poland	
Win	8–0	Krzysztof Sadecki	Decision (unanimous)	Pro Fight 6	June 4, 2011	3	5:00	Włocławek, Poland	
Win	7–0	Michal Lutka	TKO (punches)	Fight Club Koszalin	May 14, 2011	1	3:09	Koszalin, Poland	
Win	6–0	Oskar Ślepowroński	TKO (doctor stoppage)	Chelm Fight Night	April 9, 2011	1	4:09	Chełm, Poland	
Win	5–0	Shamil Ilyasov	TKO (punches)	ZSSC: Martial Arts Night 4	February 26, 2011	1	N/A	Ząbkowice Śląskie, Poland	
Win	4–0	Przemyslaw Truszewski	TKO (doctor stoppage)	ZSSC: Martial Arts Night 4	February 26, 2011	2	N/A	Ząbkowice Śląskie, Poland	
Win	3–0	Lukasz Nikolajczyk	Decision (unanimous)	ZSSC: Martial Arts Night 4	February 26, 2011	2	5:00	Ząbkowice Śląskie, Poland	
Win	2–0	Maciej Browarski	Decision (unanimous)	Black Dragon: Fight Show	November 20, 2010	2	5:00	Andrychów, Poland	Catchweight (192 lb) bout.
Win	1–0	Robert Balicki	Decision (unanimous)	Pro Fight 5	June 8, 2010	2	5:00	Wrocław, Poland	

== See also ==
- List of male mixed martial artists
