= UFC Fight Night: Overeem vs. Oleinik =

UFC mixed martial arts event in 2019

- The poster for UFC Fight Night: Overeem vs. Oleinik
- Promotion: Ultimate Fighting Championship
- Date: April 20, 2019
- Venue: Yubileyny Sports Palace
- City: Saint Petersburg, Russia
- Attendance: 7,236

Event chronology
UFC 236: Holloway vs. Poirier 2	UFC Fight Night: Overeem vs. Oleinik	UFC Fight Night: Jacaré vs. Hermansson

UFC Fight Night: Overeem vs. Oleinik (also known as UFC Fight Night 149 or UFC on ESPN+ 7) was a mixed martial arts event produced by the Ultimate Fighting Championship held on April 20, 2019, at Yubileyny Sports Palace in Saint Petersburg, Russia.

== Background ==
The event marked the promotion's first visit to Saint Petersburg and the second in Russia, after UFC Fight Night: Hunt vs. Oleinik in September 2018.

A heavyweight bout between former Bellator Heavyweight Champion Alexander Volkov and the 2010 K-1 World Grand Prix Champion and former Strikeforce Heavyweight Champion Alistair Overeem was planned to serve as the event headliner. However, Volkov pulled out of the bout due to health issues and was replaced by Aleksei Oleinik.

Emil Weber Meek was briefly connected to a welterweight bout against Sultan Aliev at the event. However, Meek withdrew from the card for an undisclosed reason and was replaced by Keita Nakamura.

Promotional newcomer Roman Dolidze was briefly linked to a bout with Gadzhimurad Antigulov at the event. However, he was replaced just days later for undisclosed reasons by Michał Oleksiejczuk.

Promotional newcomer Roman Kopylov was scheduled to make his debut against Krzysztof Jotko at the event. However, Kopylov pulled out of the bout on March 22 citing injury and was replaced by promotional newcomer Alen Amedovski.

Muin Gaurov was scheduled to face Movsar Evloev at the event. However, it was reported on March 24 that Gaurov is still contracted with ONE Championship, thus his contract with UFC was annulled. Evloev instead faced promotional newcomer Seung Woo Choi.

Abdul-Kerim Edilov was scheduled to face Devin Clark at the event. However, Edilov was removed from the card for undisclosed reasons on March 25 and was replaced by promotional newcomer Ivan Shtyrkov. In turn, it was reported that the bout was canceled a day before the event after Shtyrkov was hospitalized.

Teemu Packalén was scheduled to face Alexander Yakovlev at the event. However, Packalén was removed from the card in early April for undisclosed reasons and was replaced by promotional newcomer Alex da Silva Coelho.

== Results ==
Main Card (ESPN+)
Weight class				Method	Round	Time	Notes
Heavyweight	Alistair Overeem	def.	Aleksei Oleinik	TKO (knees and punches)	1	4:45
Lightweight	Islam Makhachev	def.	Arman Tsarukyan	Decision (unanimous) (30–27, 30–27, 29–28)	3	5:00
Heavyweight	Sergei Pavlovich	def.	Marcelo Golm	KO (punches)	1	1:06
Women's Flyweight	Roxanne Modafferi	def.	Antonina Shevchenko	Decision (split) (29–28, 28–29, 29–28)	3	5:00
Middleweight	Krzysztof Jotko	def.	Alen Amedovski	Decision (unanimous) (30–25, 30–26, 30–26)	3	5:00
Preliminary Card (ESPN2)
Featherweight	Movsar Evloev	def.	Seung Woo Choi	Decision (unanimous) (29–27, 29–27, 29–26)	3	5:00	(Note: Evloev was deducted one point in round 2 due to an illegal knee.)
Welterweight	Sultan Aliev	def.	Keita Nakamura	Decision (unanimous) (30–27, 30–27, 30–27)	3	5:00
Lightweight	Alexander Yakovlev	def.	Alex da Silva Coelho	Submission (guillotine choke)	2	3:10
Heavyweight	Shamil Abdurakhimov	def.	Marcin Tybura	TKO (punches)	2	3:15
Light Heavyweight	Michał Oleksiejczuk	def.	Gadzhimurad Antigulov	KO (punches)	1	0:44
Lightweight	Magomed Mustafaev	def.	Rafael Fiziev	TKO (spinning back kick and punches)	1	1:26

== Bonus awards ==
The following fighters were awarded $50,000 bonuses:

- Fight of the Night: Islam Makhachev vs. Arman Tsarukyan
- Performance of the Night: Sergei Pavlovich and Magomed Mustafaev

== See also ==
- List of UFC events
- 2019 in UFC
- List of current UFC fighters
