= Alen Amedovski =

Macedonian mixed martial arts fighter

- Born: April 6, 1988 (age 38); Centar Župa, Socialist Federal Republic of Yugoslavia (now North Macedonia)
- Nationality: Macedonian
- Height: 5 ft 10 in (1.78 m)
- Weight: 185 lb (84 kg; 13 st 3 lb)
- Division: Middleweight; Light Heavyweight
- Reach: 74.0 in (188 cm)
- Fighting out of: Rome, Italy
- Team: American Top Team Rome
- Years active: 2012–present

Mixed martial arts record
- Total: 13
- Wins: 8
- By knockout: 8
- Losses: 5
- By knockout: 3
- By submission: 1
- By decision: 1

Other information
- Mixed martial arts record from Sherdog

Alen Amedovski (born April 6, 1988) is a Macedonian mixed martial artist who competes in the Middleweight division. He has formerly fought for the Ultimate Fighting Championship.

== Background ==
Amedovski arrived in Trento when he was 10. He played football, rugby, and then boxing until he was 20. When he discovered MMA, he never went back. On his MMA journey, he slept on mats, ate with 5 euros a day, and spent three and a half years injured after breaking his scaphoid bone. He was a waiter and handyman to make ends meet.

== Mixed martial arts career ==
=== Early career ===
Starting his professional career in 2012 after no amateur experience, Amedovski ended all six bouts on his perfect record before signing with Bellator MMA via knockout. Six of those wins came in the first round, with four of them taking 40 seconds or less.

=== Bellator ===
Racking up a 6–0 record in the European circuit, Amedovski signed with Bellator MMA in 2018. He made his promotional debut against Will Fleury at Bellator 203 on July 14, 2018. He won the fight via first-round knockout.

In his sophomore appearance he faced Ibrahim Mane at Bellator 211 on December 1, 2018. He won the fight via first-minute knockout.

=== Ultimate Fighting Championship ===
In early 2019 Amedovski announced that he had signed with the UFC. Replacing injured Roman Kopylov, Amedovski made his promotional debut against Krzysztof Jotko on April 20, 2019, at UFC Fight Night 149. Jotko won the fight via unanimous decision. In July it was announced that Amedovski had tested positive for carboxy-THC and was suspended initially for six months. However the suspension was then halved, making him eligible to compete on July 20, 2019.

Amedovski made his sophomore appearance in the organization against John Phillips at UFC Fight Night: Hermansson vs. Cannonier on September 28, 2019. He lost the bout via knockout in 17 seconds of the first round.

Amedovski was expected to face Hu Yaozong at UFC 264 on July 10, 2021. However on the day of the event, the bout was pulled from the event due to COVID-19 protocols issues in Amedovski's camp. The bout was rescheduled for October 30, 2021 at UFC 267. However, Amedovski was removed from the event due to undisclosed reasons.

Amedovski faced Joseph Holmes at UFC Fight Night: Holm vs. Vieira on May 21, 2022. He lost the fight via rear-naked choke in round one.

Amedovski faced Joe Pyfer on September 17, 2022, at UFC Fight Night 210. He lost the fight via technical knockout in round one.

After his fourth straight loss, it was announced that Amedovski was no longer on the UFC roster.

== Mixed martial arts record ==
Professional record breakdown
13 matches	8 wins	5 losses
By knockout	8	3
By submission	0	1
By decision	0	1

Res.	Record	Opponent	Method	Event	Date	Round	Time	Location	Notes
Loss	8–5	Tato Primera	TKO (punches)	FNC 34	October 24, 2026	1	4:40	Skopje, North Macedonia	Catchweight (180 lb) bout.
Loss	8–4	Joe Pyfer	TKO (punches)	UFC Fight Night: Sandhagen vs. Song	September 17, 2022	1	3:55	Las Vegas, Nevada, United States	
Loss	8–3	Joseph Holmes	Submission (rear-naked choke)	UFC Fight Night: Holm vs. Vieira	May 21, 2022	1	1:04	Las Vegas, Nevada, United States	
Loss	8–2	John Phillips	KO (punches)	UFC Fight Night: Hermansson vs. Cannonier	September 28, 2019	1	0:17	Copenhagen, Denmark	
Loss	8–1	Krzysztof Jotko	Decision (unanimous)	UFC Fight Night: Overeem vs. Oleinik	April 20, 2019	3	5:00	Saint Petersburg, Russia	
Win	8–0	Ibrahima Mané	KO (punches)	Bellator 211	December 1, 2018	1	0:12	Genoa, Italy	
Win	7–0	Will Fleury	KO (punches)	Bellator 203	July 14, 2018	1	1:39	Rome, Italy	
Win	6–0	Badr Mamdouh	TKO (elbows)	Magnum FC 4	March 3, 2018	2	3:06	Verona, Italy	
Win	5–0	Massimiliano Sammarco	TKO (punches)	Cage Warrior 3	March 14, 2015	2	3:57	Manduria, Italy	
Win	4–0	Ivan Dorozhkin	TKO (injury)	Slam FC 7	January 5, 2015	1	0:11	Florence, Italy	Return to Middleweight.
Win	3–0	Alexander Tcaci	TKO (punches)	Milano in the Cage 4	May 3, 2014	1	3:00	Milan, Italy	
Win	2–0	Roberto Fantasia	TKO (punches)	Milano in the Cage 3	May 4, 2013	1	0:38	Milan, Italy	Light Heavyweight debut.
Win	1–0	Simone Tosatto	TKO (punches)	FIKBMS: Memorial Fabio Arbeia 7	November 25, 2012	1	0:40	Varese, Italy	Middleweight debut.

== See also ==
- List of male mixed martial artists
