= Michał Oleksiejczuk =

Polish mixed martial artist (born 1995)

- Oleksiejczuk in 2019
- Born: February 22, 1995 (age 31); Łęczna, Poland
- Other names: Hussar
- Height: 6 ft 0 in (1.83 m)
- Weight: 185 lb (84 kg; 13.2 st)
- Division: Light Heavyweight (2014–2022); Middleweight (2022–present)
- Reach: 74 in (188 cm)
- Fighting out of: Barki, Poland
- Team: Akademia Sportów Walki Wilanów (until 2022); Ankos MMA Poznań (2022–present); Fighting Nerds
- Trainer: Andrzej Koscielski
- Rank: Brown belt in Brazilian Jiu-Jitsu under Filip Ostrowski
- Years active: 2014–present

Mixed martial arts record
- Total: 33
- Wins: 22
- By knockout: 16
- By submission: 1
- By decision: 5
- Losses: 10
- By knockout: 1
- By submission: 7
- By decision: 2
- No contests: 1

Other information
- Mixed martial arts record from Sherdog

Michał Oleksiejczuk (born February 22, 1995) is a Polish mixed martial artist. A professional since 2014, he was the former Thunderstrike Fight League Light heavyweight champion in Poland. He currently competes in the middleweight division of the Ultimate Fighting Championship (UFC).

== Background ==
Michal played handball before taking up martial arts. Oleksiejczuk has a younger brother named Cezary, who is also a professional mixed martial artist.

== Mixed martial arts career ==
=== Early career ===
Oleksiejczuk started his MMA career in 2014. Fighting primarily in Poland, he amassed a record of 12–2 before being signed by UFC in 2017. During this time Oleksiejczuk won the Wenglorz Fight Cup tournament, as well as the thunderstrike fight league light heavyweight championship.

=== Ultimate Fighting Championship ===
Oleksiejczuk was expected to have made his UFC debut to face Ion Cuțelaba on November 4, 2017, at UFC 217, replacing injured Gadzhimurad Antigulov. In turn after the weigh-ins, Cuțelaba was pulled from the event by USADA due to a potential Anti-Doping Policy violation stemming from its investigation into voluntary disclosures by Cuțelaba during an out-of-competition sample collections on October 18 and October 19. Cuțelaba was provisionally suspended and the bout was scrapped.

Oleksiejczuk's UFC debut was finally set on December 30, 2017, facing Khalil Rountree Jr. and replacing injured Gökhan Saki, at UFC 219. However, after the fight, it was revealed that Oleksiejczuk had tested positive for clomiphene, an anti-estrogenic substance. As a result, the Nevada Athletic Commission (NAC) officially overturned the result of the fight to a no contest and Oleksiejczuk received one year suspension by USADA.

Oleksiejczuk returned to octagon one year later to face Gian Villante on February 23, 2019, at UFC Fight Night: Błachowicz vs. Santos. He won the fight via TKO due to a body punch early in the first round. This win earned him the Performance of the Night award.

Oleksiejczuk faced Gadzhimurad Antigulov on April 20, 2019, replacing Roman Dolidze, at UFC Fight Night: Overeem vs. Oleinik. Oleksiejczuk won the fight via knockout in the first round.

Oleksiejczuk faced Ovince Saint Preux on September 28, 2019, at UFC on ESPN+ 18. He lost the fight via submission due to a Von Flue choke in the second round.

Oleksiejczuk faced Jimmy Crute on February 23, 2020, at UFC Fight Night 168. He lost the fight via a kimura submission in the first round.

Oleksiejczuk faced Modestas Bukauskas on March 27, 2021, at UFC 260. He won a close bout via split decision.

Oleksiejczuk faced Shamil Gamzatov on October 30, 2021, at UFC 267. He won the bout via TKO in the first round.

Oleksiejczuk faced Dustin Jacoby on March 5, 2022, at UFC 272. He lost the fight via unanimous decision.

==== Drop down to middleweight ====
Oleksiejczuk faced Sam Alvey on August 6, 2022, at UFC on ESPN 40. He won the fight via technical knockout in round one.

Oleksiejczuk was scheduled to face Albert Duraev, replacing injured Bruno Silva, on December 17, 2022, at UFC Fight Night 216. In turn, Duraev was forced to withdraw for undisclosed reasons and was replaced by Cody Brundage. Oleksiejczuk won the fight via knockout in round one. This win earned him the Performance of the Night award.

Oleksiejczuk faced Caio Borralho on April 29, 2023, at UFC on ESPN: Song vs. Simón. He lost the fight via rear-naked choke in round two.

Oleksiejczuk faced Chidi Njokuani at UFC Fight Night 225 on August 26, 2023. He won by first-round ground and pound technical knockout, which earned him a Performance of the Night award.

Oleksiejczuk faced Michel Pereira on March 9, 2024, at UFC 299. He lost the bout in the first round by rear-naked choke submission.

Oleksiejczuk faced Kevin Holland on June 1, 2024, at UFC 302. After knocking Holland down, Oleksiejczuk lost by an armbar submission in the first round.

Oleksiejczuk faced Sharabutdin Magomedov on August 3, 2024 at UFC on ABC 7. He lost the fight by unanimous decision. This fight earned him a Fight of the Night award.

Oleksiejczuk faced Sedriques Dumas on April 12, 2025 at UFC 314. He won the fight by technical knockout in the first round.

Oleksiejczuk faced Gerald Meerschaert on August 16, 2025, at UFC 319. He won the fight via technical knockout in round one.

Oleksiejczuk faced Marc-André Barriault on February 7, 2026, at UFC Fight Night 266. He won the fight by unanimous decision. This fight earned him a $100,000 Fight of the Night award.

Oleksiejczuk faced Abusupiyan Magomedov on June 27, 2026 at UFC Fight Night 280. The bout was initially reported as the main event, but was changed for undisclosed reasons. Oleksiejczuk lost the fight via a guillotine choke submission in the first round.

== Personal life ==
Oleksiejczuk is married to his wife Ewelina they have 2 daughters together.

Oleksiejczuk has befriended his former opponent Caio Borralho. In 2025 Borralho invited him to the fighting nerds gym in Brazil to help him train for his fight at UFC 314. Since then Oleksiejczuk has continued to train with the fighting nerds.

== Championships and accomplishments ==
=== Mixed martial arts ===
- Ultimate Fighting Championship
  - Fight of the Night (Two times) vs. Sharabutdin Magomedov and Marc-André Barriault
  - Performance of the Night (Three times) vs. Gian Villante, Cody Brundage and Chidi Njokuani
  - Third most first-round knockouts in UFC history (8)
  - Tied (Terrance McKinney, Francis Ngannou, Joe Lauzon and Donald Cerrone) for sixth most first-round finishes in UFC history (8)
  - Most knockdowns landed in the shortest span in a bout (3 knockdowns in 44 seconds) (vs. Gadzhimurad Antigulov)
  - UFC Honors Awards
    - 2023: Fan's Choice Comeback of the Year Nominee vs. Chidi Njokuani
- Thunderstrike Fight League
  - Thunderstrike Fight League Light heavyweight Champion (One time)
    - Two Successful Title Defenses

== Mixed martial arts record ==
Professional record breakdown
33 matches	22 wins	10 losses
By knockout	16	1
By submission	1	7
By decision	5	2
No contests	1	

Res.	Record	Opponent	Method	Event	Date	Round	Time	Location	Notes
Loss	22–10 (1)	Abusupiyan Magomedov	Submission (guillotine choke)	UFC Fight Night: Fiziev vs. Torres	June 27, 2026	1	3:25	Baku, Azerbaijan	
Win	22–9 (1)	Marc-André Barriault	Decision (unanimous)	UFC Fight Night: Bautista vs. Oliveira	February 7, 2026	3	5:00	Las Vegas, Nevada, United States	Fight of the Night.
Win	21–9 (1)	Gerald Meerschaert	TKO (punches)	UFC 319	August 16, 2025	1	3:03	Chicago, Illinois, United States	
Win	20–9 (1)	Sedriques Dumas	TKO (punches and elbows)	UFC 314	April 12, 2025	1	2:49	Miami, Florida, United States	
Loss	19–9 (1)	Sharabutdin Magomedov	Decision (unanimous)	UFC on ABC: Sandhagen vs. Nurmagomedov	August 3, 2024	3	5:00	Abu Dhabi, United Arab Emirates	Fight of the Night.
Loss	19–8 (1)	Kevin Holland	Technical Submission (armbar)	UFC 302	June 1, 2024	1	1:34	Newark, New Jersey, United States	
Loss	19–7 (1)	Michel Pereira	Technical Submission (rear-naked choke)	UFC 299	March 9, 2024	1	1:01	Miami, Florida, United States	
Win	19–6 (1)	Chidi Njokuani	TKO (punches)	UFC Fight Night: Holloway vs. The Korean Zombie	August 26, 2023	1	4:16	Kallang, Singapore	Performance of the Night.
Loss	18–6 (1)	Caio Borralho	Submission (rear-naked choke)	UFC on ESPN: Song vs. Simón	April 29, 2023	2	2:49	Las Vegas, Nevada, United States	
Win	18–5 (1)	Cody Brundage	KO (punches)	UFC Fight Night: Cannonier vs. Strickland	December 17, 2022	1	3:16	Las Vegas, Nevada, United States	Performance of the Night.
Win	17–5 (1)	Sam Alvey	TKO (punches)	UFC on ESPN: Santos vs. Hill	August 6, 2022	1	1:56	Las Vegas, Nevada, United States	Return to Middleweight.
Loss	16–5 (1)	Dustin Jacoby	Decision (unanimous)	UFC 272	March 5, 2022	3	5:00	Las Vegas, Nevada, United States	
Win	16–4 (1)	Shamil Gamzatov	TKO (punches)	UFC 267	October 30, 2021	1	3:31	Abu Dhabi, United Arab Emirates	
Win	15–4 (1)	Modestas Bukauskas	Decision (split)	UFC 260	March 27, 2021	3	5:00	Las Vegas, Nevada, United States	
Loss	14–4 (1)	Jimmy Crute	Submission (kimura)	UFC Fight Night: Felder vs. Hooker	February 23, 2020	1	3:29	Auckland, New Zealand	
Loss	14–3 (1)	Ovince Saint Preux	Submission (Von Flue choke)	UFC Fight Night: Hermansson vs. Cannonier	September 28, 2019	2	2:14	Copenhagen, Denmark	
Win	14–2 (1)	Gadzhimurad Antigulov	KO (punch)	UFC Fight Night: Overeem vs. Oleinik	April 20, 2019	1	0:44	Saint Petersburg, Russia	
Win	13–2 (1)	Gian Villante	TKO (punches)	UFC Fight Night: Błachowicz vs. Santos	February 23, 2019	1	1:34	Prague, Czech Republic	Performance of the Night.
NC	12–2 (1)	Khalil Rountree Jr.	NC (overturned)	UFC 219	December 30, 2017	3	5:00	Las Vegas, Nevada, United States	Originally a unanimous decision win for Oleksiejczuk; overturned after he tested positive for clomiphene.
Win	12–2	Riccardo Nosiglia	KO (punches)	Fight Exclusive Night 17	May 12, 2017	1	1:40	Gdynia, Poland	Fight of the Night.
Win	11–2	Charles Andrade	KO (punch)	Thunderstrike Fight League 11	April 1, 2017	1	1:58	Kraśnik, Poland	Defended the TFL Light Heavyweight Championship.
Win	10–2	Łukasz Klinger	TKO (punches)	Thunderstrike Fight League 10	November 19, 2016	1	N/A	Lublin, Poland	Defended the TFL Light Heavyweight Championship.
Win	9–2	Wojciech Janusz	Decision (unanimous)	Fight Exclusive Night 12	May 20, 2016	3	5:00	Wrocław, Poland	
Win	8–2	Łukasz Borowski	Submission (rear-naked choke)	Thunderstrike Fight League 8	January 16, 2016	2	3:39	Lublin, Poland	Won the vacant TFL Light Heavyweight Championship.
Win	7–2	Michal Dobiaš	KO (kick to the body)	Wenglorz Fight Cup 6	September 26, 2015	2	N/A	Lidzbark Warmiński, Poland	Catchweight (198 lb) bout. Won the Wenglorz Fight Cup Tournament.
Win	6–2	Andrejs Zozulja	KO (punches)	Wenglorz Fight Cup 6	September 26, 2015	1	N/A	Lidzbark Warmiński, Poland	Catchweight (198 lb) bout.
Win	5–2	Tomasz Janiszewski	TKO (strikes)	Thunderstrike Fight League 7	May 2, 2015	2	4:38	Kraśnik, Poland	
Win	4–2	Seweryn Kirschhiebel	TKO (corner stoppage)	Thunderstrike Fight League 6	January 24, 2015	2	2:25	Lublin, Poland	
Loss	3–2	Marcin Wójcik	TKO (punches)	PLMMA 44	November 21, 2014	1	2:12	Bieżuń, Poland	Light Heavyweight debut.
Win	3–1	Norbert Piskorski	TKO (leg injury)	Thunderstrike Fight League 5	June 20, 2014	1	N/A	Lublin, Poland	Catchweight (212 lb) bout.
Loss	2–1	Jan Kwiatoń	Submission (triangle choke)	Thunderstrike Fight League 4	May 17, 2014	1	1:53	Łęczna, Poland	Catchweight (198 lb) bout.
Win	2–0	Mateusz Gola	Decision (unanimous)	Tymex Fight Night	February 8, 2014	3	5:00	Pionki, Poland	Catchweight (198 lb) bout.
Win	1–0	Rajmund Flejmer	Decision (unanimous)	Vale Tudo Cup 1	January 11, 2014	2	5:00	Puławy, Poland	Middleweight debut; Oleksiejczuk missed weight (191.8 lb).

== See also ==
- List of current UFC fighters
- List of male mixed martial artists
