= Real Xtreme Fighting =

Mixed martial arts promoter based in Romania

- Company type: Private
- Industry: Mixed martial arts promotion
- Founded: 2012; 14 years ago
- Founders: Sebastian Vieru
- Headquarters: Brașov, Romania
- Key people: Sebastian Vieru (President)
- Website: https://rxf.ro

Real Xtreme Fighting (RXF) is a Romanian mixed martial arts (MMA) promotion company based in Brașov, Romania. It is the largest MMA promotion company in Romania. Sebastian Vieru has been RXF president since 2012.

The RXF produces events that showcase nine weight divisions (seven men's divisions and two women's divisions). As of 2020, the RXF has held over 40 events.

It has strategic partnerships with fellow Bahraini Brave CF and Italian Magnum FC MMA promotions. Its live events and competitions are broadcast on Telekom Sport, Fight Network, DAZN and FightBox.

Cătălin Oțelea, Stelian Gheorghe, Sebastian Hălmăgean, Scott Manhardt and Herb Dean are some of the best known referees working for the organization.

== Events ==
#	Event	Date	Venue	Location	Attendance
39	Brave CF 36: Todd vs. Amílcar	July 27, 2020	Berăria H	Bucharest, Romania	0
38	Brave CF 35: Fakhreddine vs. Cortese	July 20, 2020	Berăria H	Bucharest, Romania	0
—	Brave CF 36: Brewin vs. Patterson	April 13, 2020	Berăria H	Bucharest, Romania	Cancelled
37	RXF 37: All Stars	December 16, 2019	Sala Polivalentă	Bucharest, Romania	
36	RXF 36: VIP Edition	November 4, 2019	Berăria H	Bucharest, Romania	
35	RXF 35: Sibiu	September 23, 2019	Las Vegas Casino	Sibiu, Romania	
34	RXF 34: Brașov	May 13, 2019	Dumitru Popescu Arena	Brașov, Romania	
33	RXF 33: All Stars	December 10, 2018	Sala Polivalentă	Bucharest, Romania	
32	RXF 32: Negumereanu vs. Konecke	November 19, 2018	Dumitru Popescu Arena	Brașov, Romania	
31	RXF 31: Cluj-Napoca	October 1, 2018	Horia Demian Arena	Cluj-Napoca, Romania	
30	RXF 30: Bucharest	August 20, 2018	Sala Polivalentă	Bucharest, Romania	
29	RXF 29: All Stars	December 18, 2017	Lux Divina	Brașov, Romania	
28	RXF 28: VIP Special Edition	October 30, 2017	Lux Divina	Brașov, Romania	
27	RXF 27: Next Fighter	July 29, 2017	Sala Polivalentă	Piatra Neamț, Romania	
26	RXF 26: Brașov	April 25, 2017	Dumitru Popescu Arena	Brașov, Romania	
25	RXF 25: All Stars	December 19, 2016	Olimpia Arena	Ploiești, Romania	
24	RXF 24: Brașov	October 10, 2016	Dumitru Popescu Arena	Brașov, Romania	
23	RXF 23: Romania vs. United Kingdom	June 6, 2016	Sala Polivalentă	Bucharest, Romania	
22	RXF 22: Romania vs. Poland	March 21, 2016	Bucharest Metropolitan Circus	Bucharest, Romania	2,500
21	RXF 21: All Stars	December 14, 2015	Sala Polivalentă	Bucharest, Romania	
20	RXF 20: Verhoeven vs. Bogutzki	October 19, 2015	Sala Transilvania	Sibiu, Romania	4,000
19	RXF 19: Galați	August 31, 2015	Dunărea Ice Arena	Galați, Romania	
18	RXF 18: Stanciu vs. Belbiță	June 15, 2015	BTarena	Cluj-Napoca, Romania	6,000
17	RXF 17: Craiova	March 16, 2015	Sala Polivalentă	Craiova, Romania	4,000
16	RXF 16: Brașov	February 16, 2015	Dumitru Popescu Arena	Brașov, Romania	
15	RXF 15: All Stars	December 15, 2014	Sala Polivalentă	Bucharest, Romania	5,000
14	RXF 14: Sibiu	November 3, 2014	Sala Transilvania	Sibiu, Romania	
13	RXF 13: Fight Night Moldavia	October 6, 2014	Elisabeta Lipă Arena	Botoșani, Romania	
12	RXF 12: Mamaia	August 4, 2014	Piațeta Cazino	Mamaia, Constanța, Romania	10,000
11	RXF 11: Mountain Fight	May 31, 2014	Brașov Ice Arena	Brașov, Romania	
10	RXF 10: Pascu vs. Bunea	April 5, 2014	Sala Polivalentă	Drobeta-Turnu Severin, Romania	
9	RXF 9: Romania vs. Hungary	January 31, 2014	Sala Polivalentă	Craiova, Romania	3,000
8	RXF 8: Bucharest	December 7, 2013	Turbohalle	Bucharest, Romania	
7	RXF 7: Pitești	September 27, 2013	Sala Polivalentă	Pitești, Romania	
6	RXF 6: Brașov	July 19, 2013	Dumitru Popescu Arena	Brașov, Romania	
5	RXF 5: Sibiu	March 22, 2013	Sala Transilvania	Sibiu, Romania	
4	RXF 4: Târgoviște	October 18, 2012	Sala Sporturilor	Târgoviște, Romania	
3	RXF 3: Brașov	April 21, 2012	Hacienda	Brașov, Romania	

== Champions ==
=== Current RXF champions ===
Men's division	Upper weight limit	Champion	Since	Title Defenses
Heavyweight	265 lb (120.2 kg)	Vacant	N/A	N/A
Light Heavyweight	205 lb (93.0 kg)	Vacant	N/A	N/A
Middleweight	185 lb (83.9 kg)	Vacant	N/A	N/A
Welterweight	170 lb (77.1 kg)	Vacant	N/A	N/A
Lightweight	154 lb (69.9 kg)	Vacant	N/A	N/A
Featherweight	143 lb (64.9 kg)	Vacant	N/A	N/A
Bantamweight	134 lb (60.8 kg)	Vacant	N/A	N/A

Women’s division	Upper weight limit	Champion	Since	Title Defenses
Bantamweight	132 lb (59.9 kg)	Vacant	N/A	N/A
Flyweight	125 lb (56.7 kg)	Vacant	N/A	N/A

=== Heavyweight Championship ===
Weight limit: 265 lb (120.2 kg)

No.	Name	Event	Date	Defenses
1	(Romania) Cristian Mitrea def. Marian Rusu	Romanian XF 14; Sibiu, Romania	Nov 3, 2014	
Mitrea vacated to compete at light heavyweight.
2	(Romania) Robert Orbocea def. Marian Rusu	RXF 18; Cluj-Napoca, Romania	Jun 15, 2015	
3	(Romania) Anatoli Ciumac	RXF 23; Buchrest, Romania	Jun 6, 2016	1. def Michał Wlazło at RXF 25 on Dec 19, 2016
Ciumac vacated.
4	(Romania) Ion Grigore def. Marian Iovita	RXF 40; Romania	Sep 15, 2021	
Grigore vacated.

=== Light Heavyweight Championship ===
Weight limit: 205 lb (93.0 kg)

No.	Name	Event	Date	Defenses
1	(Romania) Adrian Preda def. Marvin Campbell	RXF 21; Bucharest, Romania	Dec 14, 2015	
2	(Germany) Dan Konecke	RXF 25; Bucharest, Romania	Dec 19, 2016	
3	(Romania) Nicolae Negumereanu	RXF 32; Brasov, Romania	Nov 19, 2018	
Negumereanu vacated to compete for the UFC.

=== Middleweight Championship ===
Weight limit: 185 lb (83.9 kg)

No.	Name	Event	Date	Defenses
1	(Romania) Ciprian Chiru def. Izidor Bunea	Romanian XF 14; Sibiu, Romania	Nov 3, 2014	1. def Sergiu Breb at RXF 18 on Jun 15, 2015
2	(Romania) Sergiu Breb	RXF 20; Sibiu, Romania	Oct 19, 2015	
Breb vacated.

=== Welterweight Championship ===
Weight limit: 170 lb (77.1 kg)

No.	Name	Event	Date	Defenses
1	(United States) Michael Brightmon def. Andrei Vasinca	Romanian XF 14; Sibiu, Romania	Nov 3, 2014	
2	(Romania) Aurel Pîrtea	RXF 22; Bucharest, Romania	Mar 21, 2016	
Pîrtea vacated.
3	(Moldova) Ion Surdu def. Farzad Ghaderi	RXF 37; Bucharest, Romania	Dec 16, 2019	
Surdu vacated.

=== Lightweight Championship ===
Weight limit: 154 lb (69.9 kg)

No.	Name	Event	Date	Defenses
1	(Romania) Catalin Casaru def. Adrian Grec	Romanian XF 15; Bucharest, Romania	Dec 15, 2014	1. def. Adrian Grec at RXF 26 on Apr 25, 2017
Casaru vacated.
2	(Romania) Dinu Bucalet def. Adi Cornel Sturzu	RXF 17; Craiova, Romania	Mar 16, 2015	
Bucalet vacated.
3	(Romania) Adi Cornel Sturzu def. Catalin Miron	RXF 20; Sibiu, Romania	Oct 19, 2015	
Sturzu vacated.
4	(Romania) Corneliu Rotaru Lascar def. Laurentiu Calugaru	RXF 31; Cluj-Napoca, Romania	Oct 1, 2018	
Lascar vacated.

=== Featherweight Championship ===
Weight limit: 143 lb (64.9 kg)

No.	Name	Event	Date	Defenses
1	(Romania) Florin Gârdan def. Bogdan Barbu	Romanian XF 15; Bucharest, Romania	Dec 15, 2014	1. def. Ciprian Maris at RXF 18 on Jun 15, 2015; 2. def. Ioan Vrânceanu at RXF 21 on Dec 14, 2015
Gârdan vacated.

=== Bantamweight Championship ===
Weight limit: 134 lb (60.8 kg)

No.	Name	Event	Date	Defenses
1	(Romania) Bogdan Barbu def. Ciprian Maris	RXF 26; Brasov, Romania	Apr 25, 2017	1. def. Ioan Vrânceanu at RXF 33 on Dec 10, 2018
Barbu vacated.

=== Women’s Bantamweight Championship ===
Weight limit: 132 lb (59.9 kg)

No.	Name	Event	Date	Defenses
1	(Romania) Cristina Stanciu def. Diana Belbita	RXF 18; Cluj-Napoca, Romania	Jun 15, 2015	
Stanciu vacated.

=== Women’s Flyweight Championship ===
Weight limit: 125 lb (56.7 kg)

No.	Name	Event	Date	Defenses
1	(Romania) Alice Ardelean def. Ana Maria Pal	RXF 40; Romania	Sep 15, 2021	
Ardelean vacated.

== Notable fighters ==
=== Male ===
- (Romania) Alexandru Lungu
- (Romania) Florin Lambagiu
- (Romania) Ion Pascu
- (Romania) Nicolae Negumereanu
- (Romania) Aurel Pîrtea
- (Romania) Anatoli Ciumac
- (Brazil) Diego Nunes
- (Canada) Kyle Nelson
- (Canada) Josh Hill
- (England) Luke Barnatt
- (Israel) Levi Matan
- (Israel) Jackie Gosh
- (Netherlands) Rico Verhoeven
- (United States) Carlo Pedersoli Jr.
- (England) Andrew Tate

=== Female ===
- (Romania) Cristina Stanciu
- (Romania) Diana Belbiţă
- (Italy) Micol Di Segni
