= 2018 in RXF =

Mixed martial arts events

- Genre: Sports
- Created by: Sebastian Vieru
- Country of origin: Romania

Original release
- Network: Telekom Sport; Fight Network; FightBox; Sport Extra
- Release: August 20 – December 10, 2018

2018 was the 7th year in the history of RXF, the largest mixed martial arts promotion based in Romania.

== List of events ==
#	Event title	Date	Arena	Location
1	RXF 33: All Stars	December 10, 2018	Sala Polivalentă	Bucharest, Romania
2	RXF 32: Negumereanu vs. Konecke	November 19, 2018	Dumitru Popescu Arena	Brașov, Romania
3	RXF 31: Cluj-Napoca	October 1, 2018	Horia Demian Arena	Cluj-Napoca, Romania
4	RXF 30: Bucharest	August 20, 2018	Sala Polivalentă	Bucharest, Romania

== RXF 30 ==
RXF 30: Bucharest
- Promotion: RXF
- Date: August 20, 2018
- Venue: Sala Polivalentă
- City: Bucharest, Romania

Event chronology
RXF 29: All Stars	RXF 30: Bucharest	RXF 31: Cluj-Napoca

RXF 30: Bucharest was a mixed martial arts event that took place on August 20, 2018 at the Sala Polivalentă in Bucharest, Romania.

=== Results ===
Main card
Weight class				Method	Round	Time	Notes
Women's Flyweight	(Romania) Diana Belbiţă	def.	(Romania) Ana Maria Pal	Submission (armbar)	2	1:35
Light Heavyweight	(Romania) Eugen Preda	def.	(England) Ashley Gibson	Submission (armbar)	1	2:17
Bantamweight	(Romania) Ciprian Mariș	def.	(Romania) Ioan Vrânceanu	Decision (split)	3	5:00
Lightweight	(Romania) Corneliu Lascăr	def.	(Romania) Andrei Vasinca	TKO (punches)	1	3:44
Welterweight	(Romania) Alex Atănăsoaie	def.	(Romania) Radu Dorobanţ	TKO (punches)	1	4:05
Welterweight	(Romania) Ion Surdu	def.	(Iran) Farzad Ghaderi	TKO (punches)	1	3:40
Heavyweight	(Romania) Ion Grigore	def.	(Iran) Milad Sedigh Moridani	TKO (punches)	1	3:54
Featherweight	(Romania) Florin Pîrtea	def.	(Iran) Alireza Akbari	Submission (armbar)	2	1:39
Lightweight	(Romania) Albert Paul	def.	(Romania) Nicolae Călin	TKO (punches)	1	2:24
Featherweight	(Azerbaijan) İska İsmayilov	def.	(Romania) Radu Mihăiță	Submission (guillotine choke)	1	1:44
Featherweight	(Romania) Aurel Rășteanu	def.	(Moldova) Alexandru Petropavlovski	TKO (punches)	1	2:12

== RXF 31 ==
RXF 31: Cluj-Napoca
- Promotion: RXF
- Date: October 1, 2018
- Venue: Horia Demian Arena
- City: Cluj-Napoca, Romania

Event chronology
RXF 30: Bucharest	RXF 31: Cluj-Napoca	RXF 32: Negumereanu vs. Konecke

RXF 31: Cluj-Napoca was a mixed martial arts event that took place on October 1, 2018 at the Horia Demian Arena in Cluj-Napoca, Romania.

=== Results ===
Main card
Weight class				Method	Round	Time	Notes
Super Heavyweight	(Romania) Alexandru Lungu	def.	(Slovakia) Peter Balaž	Submission (smother)	1	3:05
Lightweight	(Romania) Corneliu Lascăr	def.	(Romania) Laurențiu Călugăru	Decision (split)	3	5:00	(Note: For the vacant RXF Lightweight Championship.)
Featherweight	(Romania) Ciprian Mariș	def.	(Serbia) Mirko Jovanović	TKO (punches)	1	1:48
Bantamweight	(Romania) Bogdan Barbu	def.	(Serbia) Mihajlo Pajić	TKO (punches)	1	1:27
Welterweight	(Romania) Ion Surdu	def.	(Serbia) Velimir Nestorović	TKO (punches)	1	1:14
Heavyweight	(Romania) Nicolae Negumereanu	def.	(Hungary) Kálmán Kovács	Submission (rear-naked choke)	1	3:12
Women's Flyweight	(Romania) Ana Maria Pal	def.	(Hungary) Renáta Cseh-Lantos	TKO (punches)	2	4:24
Featherweight	(Romania) Cosmin Dușa	def.	(Romania) Florin Lupu	Decision (unanimous)	3	5:00

== RXF 32 ==
RXF 32: Negumereanu vs. Konecke
- Promotion: RXF
- Date: November 19, 2018
- Venue: Dumitru Popescu Arena
- City: Brașov, Romania

Event chronology
RXF 31: Cluj-Napoca	RXF 32: Negumereanu vs. Konecke	RXF 33: All Stars

RXF 32: Negumereanu vs. Konecke was a mixed martial arts event that took place on November 19, 2018 at the Dumitru Popescu Arena in Brașov, Romania.

=== Results ===
Main card
Weight class				Method	Round	Time	Notes
Light Heavyweight	(Romania) Nicolae Negumereanu	def.	(England) Dan Konecke (c)	Submission (brabo choke)	2	0:30	(Note: For the RXF Light Heavyweight Championship.)
Welterweight	(Romania) Daniel Stinghe	def.	(Romania) Lazăr Edea	Decision (split)	3	5:00
Lightweight	(Canada) Kyle Nelson	def.	(Iran) Morteza Rezaei	TKO (punches)	1	4:57
Bantamweight	(Canada) Gabe Sagman	def.	(Iran) Reza Razavi	Decision (unanimous)	3	5:00
Middleweight	(Romania) Marinică Bejenaru	def.	(Iran) Amin Nik Aein Kopaei	TKO (punches)	2	2:29
Welterweight	(Iran) Farzad Ghader	def.	(Romania) Robert Gontineac	TKO (punches)	1	1:29
Welterweight	(Romania) Laurențiu Călugăru	def.	(Romania) Andrei Vasinca	TKO (punches)	3	1:27
Lightweight	(Romania) Radu Dorobanț	def.	(Moldova) Oleg Crăciun	Decision (unanimous)	3	5:00
Bantamweight	(Romania) Darius Buda	def.	(Romania) Sorinel Grancea	Submission (triangle choke)	1	3:13
Middleweight	(Romania) Flaviu Niţă	def.	(Romania) Gabriel Suller	TKO (punches)	1	4:35
Bantamweight	(Romania) Marius Șalaru	def.	(Romania) Alexandru Mezei	Decision (unanimous)	3	5:00
Lightweight	(Romania) George Marlan	def.	(Romania) Florin Șoimu	TKO (punches)	1	4:17

== RXF 33 ==
RXF 33: All Stars
- Promotion: RXF
- Date: December 10, 2018
- Venue: Sala Polivalentă
- City: Bucharest, Romania

Event chronology
RXF 32: Negumereanu vs. Konecke	RXF 33: All Stars	RXF 34: Brașov

RXF 33: All Stars was a mixed martial arts event that took place on December 10, 2018 at the Sala Polivalentă in Bucharest, Romania.

=== Results ===
Main card
Weight class				Method	Round	Time	Notes
Light Heavyweight	(Romania) Cristian Mitrea	def.	(England) Ashley Gibson	TKO (punches)	1	0:42
Women's Flyweight	(Romania) Diana Belbiţă	def.	(Serbia) Milena Bojić	TKO (punches)	1	0:17
Bantamweight	(Romania) Bogdan Barbu (c)	def.	(Romania) Ioan Vrânceanu	Decision (unanimous)	3	5:00	(Note: For the RXF Bantamweight Championship.)
Lightweight	(Romania) Aurel Pîrtea	def.	(Serbia) Stevan Belakov	Submission (armbar)	1	0:32
Featherweight	(Romania) Ciprian Mariș	def.	(Iran) Omid Kordmanjiri	TKO (punches)	2	4:25
Heavyweight	(Romania) Vlademir Comorovschi	def.	(Romania) Robert Fazekaș	TKO (punches)	1	0:26
Heavyweight	(Romania) Ion Grigore	def.	(Romania) Dumitru Ţîră	TKO (punches)	1	1:15
Light Heavyweight	(Sweden) Anton Turkalj	def.	(Romania) Marius Pîslariu	TKO (punches)	1	0:32

== See also ==
- 2018 in Romanian kickboxing
