= 2019 in RXF =

Mixed martial arts events

- Genre: Sports
- Created by: Sebastian Vieru
- Country of origin: Romania

Original release
- Network: Telekom Sport; Fight Network; FightBox; Sport Extra; AntenaPlay; Music Channel
- Release: May 13 – December 16, 2019

2019 was the 8th year in the history of RXF, the largest mixed martial arts promotion based in Romania.

== List of events ==
#	Event title	Date	Arena	Location
1	RXF 37: All Stars	December 16, 2019	Sala Polivalentă	Bucharest, Romania
2	RXF 36: VIP Edition	November 4, 2019	Berăria H	Bucharest, Romania
3	RXF 35: Sibiu	September 23, 2019	Las Vegas Casino	Sibiu, Romania
4	RXF 34: Brașov	May 13, 2019	Dumitru Popescu Arena	Brașov, Romania

== RXF 34 ==
RXF 34: Brașov
- Promotion: RXF
- Date: May 13, 2019
- Venue: Dumitru Popescu Arena
- City: Brașov, Romania

Event chronology
RXF 33: All Stars	RXF 34: Brașov	RXF 35: Sibiu

RXF 34: Brașov was a mixed martial arts event that took place on May 13, 2019 at the Dumitru Popescu Arena in Brașov, Romania.

=== Results ===
Main card
Weight class				Method	Round	Time	Notes
Lightweight	(Moldova) Vlad Popovskiy	def.	(Iran) Farzad Ghaderi	TKO (punches)	1	3:45	(Note: For the RXF Lightweight Championship.)
Women's Flyweight	(Romania) Diana Belbiţă	def.	(Romania) Ana Maria Pal	Submission (armbar)	2	3:26
Bantamweight	(Iran) Mojtaba Nasiri	def.	(Romania) Ioan Vrânceanu	Submission (armbar)	1	2:49
Lightweight	(Romania) Corneliu Lascăr	def.	(Romania) Robert Gontineac	TKO (punches)	1	3:36
Middleweight	(Romania) Marinică Bejenaru	def.	(Iran) Majid Sedigh Moridani	TKO (punches)	2	4:04
Welterweight	(Romania) Radu Dorobanţ	def.	(Serbia) Slobodan Djordjević	Submission (guillotine choke)	1	3:55
Middleweight	(Romania) Flaviu Niţă	def.	(Iran) Amir Nik Aein	Submission (guillotine choke)	1	2:31
Heavyweight	(Iran) Hosein Helali	def.	(Romania) Alexandru Stoica	Submission (strikes)	1	2:54

== RXF 35 ==
RXF 35: Sibiu
- Promotion: RXF
- Date: September 23, 2019
- Venue: Las Vegas Casino
- City: Sibiu, Romania

Event chronology
RXF 34: Brașov	RXF 35: Sibiu	RXF 36: VIP Edition

RXF 35: Sibiu was a mixed martial arts event that took place on September 23, 2019 at the Las Vegas Casino in Sibiu, Romania.

=== Results ===
Main card
Weight class				Method	Round	Time	Notes
Featherweight	(Romania) Ciprian Mariș	def.	(Ukraine) Anton Lazebnov	TKO (punches)	1	4:58
Lightweight	(Iran) Farzad Ghaderi	def.	(Romania) Alexandru Cireșescu	TKO (punches)	1	4:38
Featherweight	(Romania) Florin Pîrtea	def.	(Serbia) Danijel Aranđelović	Submission (armbar)	1	4:19
Women's Flyweight	(Romania) Ana Maria Pal	def.	(Iran) Samereh Kiani	Submission (armbar)	1	0:20
Welterweight	(Romania) Robert Gontineac	def.	(Romania) Marian Olaru	Submission (armbar)	1	3:26
Welterweight	(Romania) Laurențiu Călugăru	def.	(Romania) Andrei Muntean	TKO (punches)	1	4:42
Middleweight	(Moldova) Vasile Suprovici	def.	(Iran) Majid Sedigh Moridani	TKO (punches)	1	4:38
Bantamweight	(Iran) Mojtaba Nasiri	def.	(Romania) Darius Buda	Submission (armbar)	1	0:24
Lightweight	(Iran) Reza Razavi	def.	(Moldova) Vasile Mîrza	Submission (armbar)	1	4:58
Bantamweight	(Romania) Costin Buhnă	def.	(Serbia) Mihajlo Rajic	Submission (guillotine choke)	1	2:54
Featherweight	(Romania) Mihai Leș	def.	(Romania) Cristian Sora	TKO (punches)	1	3:38

== RXF 36 ==
RXF 36: VIP Edition
- Promotion: RXF; Brave Combat Federation
- Date: November 4, 2019
- Venue: Berăria H
- City: Bucharest, Romania

Event chronology
RXF 35: Sibiu	RXF 36: VIP Edition	RXF 37: All Stars

RXF 36: VIP Edition was a mixed martial arts event that took place on November 4, 2019 at the Berăria H in Bucharest, Romania.

=== Results ===
Main card
Weight class				Method	Round	Time	Notes
Lightweight	(New Zealand) John Brewin	def.	(Poland) Maciej Gierszewski	Submission (armbar)	1	3:58
Catchweight (170 lb)	(France) Benoît Saint-Denis	vs.	(Poland) Paweł Kiełek	No Contest	2	5:00
Featherweight	(Bulgaria) Nikolay Grozdev	def.	(Japan) Issei Moriyama	Submission (guillotine choke)	1	2:08
Flyweight	(South Africa) Dansheel Moodley	def.	(France) Noureddin Hazret	Decision (unanimous)	3	5:00
Welterweight	(Romania) Mirel Drăgan	def.	(Romania) Leonard Bonțoi	TKO (punches)	1	1:12
Lightweight	(Romania) Laurențiu Călugăru	def.	(Moldova) Oleg Crăciun	TKO (punches)	1	1:29
Heavyweight	(Romania) Ion Grigore	def.	(Romania) Constantin Dănilă	TKO (punches)	1	3:36
Welterweight	(Romania) Cristian Iorga	def.	(Romania) Alexandru Nicolae	TKO (punches)	1	0:42
Middleweight	(Moldova) Vasile Suprovici	def.	(Iran) Amin Nik Aein Kopaei	TKO (punches)	2	2:24
Welterweight	(Romania) Marian Olaru	def.	(Romania) Laur Palievici	Submission (strikes)	2	2:21
Welterweight	(Romania) Florin Pîrtea	def.	(Romania) Marcel Caraion	KO	1	0:06
Lightweight	(Bulgaria) Nikola Didov	def.	(Romania) Radu Mihăiță	KO (punches)	3	0:26
Welterweight	(Moldova) Ion Taburceanu	def.	(Romania) Gheorghe Neațu	TKO (punches)	1	2:54

== RXF 37 ==
RXF 37: All Stars
- Promotion: RXF
- Date: December 16, 2019
- Venue: Sala Polivalentă
- City: Bucharest, Romania

Event chronology
RXF 36: VIP Edition	RXF 37: All Stars	Brave CF 36

RXF 37: All Stars was a mixed martial arts event that took place on December 16, 2019 at the Sala Polivalentă in Bucharest, Romania.

=== Results ===
Main card
Weight class				Method	Round	Time	Notes
Welterweight	(Romania) Ion Surdu	def.	(Iran) Farzad Ghaderi	TKO (punches)	2	4:08	(Note: For the RXF Welterweight Championship.)
Lightweight	(Romania) Laurențiu Călugăru	def.	(Ukraine) Ibrahimli Toghrul	Submission (guillotine choke)	3	2:13
Featherweight	(Romania) Dario Drotar	def.	(Romania) Radu Mihăiță	TKO (punches)	1	3:58
Featherweight	(Romania) Ciprian Mariș	def.	(Moldova) Lilian Grosu	Submission (rear-naked choke)	1	1:06
Welterweight	(Romania) Florin Pîrtea	def.	(Iran) Reza Masoum	Submission (triangle choke)	1	4:56
Lightweight	(Romania) Mihai Iorga	def.	(Romania) Răzvan Cercel	Submission (guillotine choke)	1	1:32
Welterweight	(Romania) Viorel Ioniță	def.	(Romania) Marian Olaru	TKO (punches)	1	1:32
Featherweight	(Romania) Bogdan Barbu	def.	(Serbia) Mirko Jovanović	Submission (heel hook)	1	0:43
Heavyweight	(Romania) Eugen Preda	def.	(Serbia) Miralem Ahmeti	Submission (keylock)	1	1:03

== See also ==
- 2019 in Romanian kickboxing
