= 2020 in RXF =

Mixed martial arts events

- Genre: Sports
- Created by: Sebastian Vieru
- Country of origin: Romania

Original release
- Network: Telekom Sport; Fight Network; DAZN; FightBox; Sport Extra
- Release: April 13, 2020 – present

2020 was the 9th year in the history of RXF, the largest mixed martial arts promotion based in Romania. Because of the COVID-19 pandemic in Romania, the promotion went on hiatus. It resumed holding events after the middle of the year.

== List of events ==
#	Event Title	Date	Arena	Location
1	Brave CF 36: Brewin vs. Patterson	April 13, 2020	—N/a	Bucharest, Romania
2	Brave CF 35: Fakhreddine vs. Cortese	July 20, 2020	Berăria H	Bucharest, Romania
3	Brave CF 36: Todd vs. Amílcar	July 27, 2020	Berăria H	Bucharest, Romania

== Brave CF 36 (Cancelled) ==
Brave CF 36: Brewin vs. Patterson
- Promotion: Brave Combat Federation; RXF
- Date: April 13, 2020 (cancelled)
- City: Bucharest, Romania

Event chronology
RXF 37: All Stars	Brave CF 36: Brewin vs. Patterson	Brave CF 35

Brave CF 36: Brewin vs. Patterson was a planned mixed martial arts event originally to take place on April 13, 2020, in Bucharest, Romania. Due to the COVID-19 pandemic, the event was eventually postponed.

=== Fight card ===
Fight card
Weight class				Method	Round	Time	Notes
Lightweight	(New Zealand) John Brewin	vs.	(England) Sam Patterson
Featherweight	(England) Shoaib Yousaf	vs.	(South Korea) Kim Tae-kyun
Featherweight	(South Africa) Steven Gonçalves	vs.	(Republic of Ireland) Nikolay Grozdev
Middleweight	(South Africa) Chad Hanekom	vs.	(Italy) Enrico Cortese

== Brave CF 35 ==
Brave CF 35: Fakhreddine vs. Cortese
- Promotion: Brave Combat Federation; RXF
- Date: July 20, 2020
- Venue: Berăria H
- City: Bucharest, Romania
- Attendance: None (behind closed doors)

Event chronology
Brave CF 36 (Cancelled)	Brave CF 35: Fakhreddine vs. Cortese	Brave CF 36

Brave CF 35: Fakhreddine vs. Cortese was a mixed martial arts event that took place on July 20, 2020, at the Berăria H in Bucharest, Romania.

=== Results ===
Main card
Weight class				Method	Round	Time	Notes
Catchweight (194 lb)	(Italy) Enrico Cortese	def.	(Romania) Claudiu Alexe	Submission (strikes)	1	2:00
Heavyweight	(Romania) Ion Grigore	def.	(France) Mamadou Lamine Sène	TKO (punches)	2	4:30
Women's Flyweight	(Sweden) Malin Hermansson	def.	(Romania) Ana Maria Pal	Submission (rear-naked choke)	2	2:30
Lightweight	(France) Aboubakar Tounkara	def.	(Romania) Marvin Belecciu	TKO (punches and elbows)	2	3:36
Bantamweight	(Romania) Mihai Laurențiu Iorga	def.	(Romania) Ioan Vrânceanu	KO (head kick)	2	3:34
Welterweight	(Romania) Mirel Drăgan	def.	(Romania) Marian Olaru	Submission (guillotine choke)	1	2:39

== Brave CF 36 ==
Brave CF 36: Todd vs. Amílcar
- Promotion: Brave Combat Federation; RXF
- Date: July 27, 2020
- Venue: Berăria H
- City: Bucharest, Romania
- Attendance: None (behind closed doors)

Event chronology
Brave CF 35	Brave CF 36: Todd vs. Amílcar	TBA

Brave CF 35: Todd vs. Amílcar was a mixed martial arts event that took place on July 27, 2020, at the Berăria H in Bucharest, Romania.

=== Results ===
Main card
Weight class				Method	Round	Time	Notes
Catchweight (234 lb)	(Canada) Todd Stoute	def.	(Romania) Cristian Constantinov	Submission (strikes)	1	2:12
Welterweight	(Switzerland) Kevin Ruart	def.	(Romania) Ion Surdu	KO (punches)	1	3:14
Catchweight (159 lb)	(Poland) Maciej Gierszewski	def.	(Romania) Bogdan Suru	TKO (punches)	1	1:08
Featherweight	(Austria) Mochamed Machaev	def.	(Romania) Ciprian Mariș	TKO (doctor stoppage)	2	5:00
Bantamweight	(Latvia) Matiss Zaharovs	def.	(Sweden) Bilal Tipsaev	TKO (punches)	3	2:16

== See also ==
- 2020 in UFC
- 2020 in Bellator MMA
- 2020 in ONE Championship
- 2020 in Absolute Championship Akhmat
- 2020 in Konfrontacja Sztuk Walki
- 2020 in Romanian kickboxing
