= 2015 in RXF =

Mixed martial arts events

- Genre: Sports
- Created by: Sebastian Vieru
- Country of origin: Romania

Original release
- Network: Sport.ro; Fight Network; FightBox
- Release: February 16 – December 14, 2015

2015 was the 4th year in the history of RXF, the largest mixed martial arts promotion based in Romania.

== List of events ==
#	Event title	Date	Arena	Location
1	RXF 21: All Stars	December 14, 2015	Sala Polivalentă	Bucharest, Romania
2	RXF 20: Verhoeven vs. Bogutzki	October 19, 2015	Sala Transilvania	Sibiu, Romania
3	RXF 19: Galați	August 31, 2015	Dunărea Ice Arena	Galați, Romania
4	RXF 18: Stanciu vs. Belbiță	June 15, 2015	BTarena	Cluj-Napoca, Romania
5	RXF 17: Craiova	March 16, 2015	Sala Polivalentă	Craiova, Romania
6	RXF 16: Brașov	February 16, 2015	Dumitru Popescu Arena	Brașov, Romania

== RXF 16 ==
RXF 16: Brașov
- Promotion: RXF
- Date: February 16, 2015
- Venue: Dumitru Popescu Arena
- City: Brașov, Romania

Event chronology
RXF 15: All Stars	RXF 16: Brașov	RXF 17: Craiova

RXF 16: Brașov was a mixed martial arts event that took place on February 16, 2015, at the Dumitru Popescu Arena in Brașov, Romania.

=== Results ===
Main card
Weight class				Method	Round	Time	Notes
Light Heavyweight	(Turkey) Ibrahim Telli	def.	(Romania) Sebastian Ciobanu	Decision (unanimous)	3	5:00
Featherweight	(Romania) Virgil Munteanu	def.	(Romania) Ioan Vrânceanu	Submission (guillotine choke)	1	1:02
Featherweight	(Romania) Ciprian Mariș	def.	(Romania) Bogdan Barbu	Submission (guillotine choke)	1	1:23
Middleweight	(Romania) Izidor Bunea	def.	(Romania) Alexandru Caradima	TKO (punches)	1	2:27
Lightweight	(Romania) Dinu Bucaleț	def.	(Romania) Dumitru Bostan	Submission (guillotine choke)	3	4:32
Featherweight	(Romania) Marius Șalaru	def.	(Romania) Rayko Leviţchi	Decision (unanimous)	3	5:00
Featherweight	(Romania) Bogdan Nuț	def.	(Romania) Florin Stan	Submission (armbar)	1	2:38
Welterweight	(Romania) Daniel Stinghe	def.	(Romania) Andrei Vasinca	Submission (guillotine choke)	2	1:05
Lightweight	(Romania) Adrian Sturzu	def.	(Romania) Alexandru Popescu	Submission (armbar)	1	2:31
Featherweight	(Romania) Alexandru Mezei	def.	(Romania) Răzvan Duță	Decision (unanimous)	3	5:00
Women's Flyweight	(Romania) Delia Georgescu	def.	(Romania) Maia Buzaș	TKO (punches)	1	0:52

== RXF 17 ==
RXF 17: Craiova
- Promotion: RXF
- Date: March 16, 2015
- Venue: Sala Polivalentă
- City: Craiova, Romania
- Attendance: 4,000

Event chronology
RXF 16: Brașov	RXF 17: Craiova	RXF 18: Stanciu vs. Belbiță

RXF 17: Craiova was a mixed martial arts event that took place on March 16, 2015, at the Sala Polivalentă in Craiova, Romania.

=== Results ===
Main card
Weight class				Method	Round	Time	Notes
Featherweight	(Azerbaijan) Samir Aliev	def.	(Romania) Ionuț Atodiresei	Submission (leg lock)	1	4:18
Open Weight	(Romania) Cristian Mitrea	def.	(England) Marvin Campbell	Submission (kimura)	1	4:20
Women's Bantamweight	(Romania) Diana Belbiţă	def.	(Hungary) Renáta Cseh-Lantos	Decision (unanimous)	3	5:00
Women's Bantamweight	(Romania) Cristina Stanciu	def.	(Romania) Alice Ardelean	Decision (split)	3	5:00
Heavyweight	(Romania) Anatoli Ciumac	def.	(Romania) Florin Boboc	Decision (unanimous)	3	5:00
Light Heavyweight	(Romania) Sergiu Breb	def.	(Romania) Andrei Năstac	TKO (Punches)	1	1:13
Lightweight	(Romania) Dinu Bucaleț	def.	(Romania) Adrian Sturzu	Submission (armbar)	1	2:51	(Note: For the vacant RXF Lightweight Championship.)
Welterweight	(Romania) Dorin Stan	def.	(Romania) Marius Tiţă	KO (punch)	2	2:46
Heavyweight	(Romania) Marian Iordan	def.	(Romania) Alexandru Stoica	KO (punch)	1	0:53
Welterweight	(Romania) Aurel Pîrtea	def.	(Romania) Cătălin Miron	TKO (punches)	1	2:10
Welterweight	(Romania) Laurențiu Călugăru	def.	(Romania) Ion Vodă	Submission (guillotine choke)	1	1:28

== RXF 18 ==
RXF 18: Stanciu vs. Belbiță
- Promotion: RXF
- Date: June 15, 2015
- Venue: BTarena
- City: Cluj-Napoca, Romania
- Attendance: 6,000

Event chronology
RXF 17: Craiova	RXF 18: Stanciu vs. Belbiță	RXF 19: Galați

RXF 18: Stanciu vs. Belbiță was a mixed martial arts event that took place on June 15, 2015, at the BTarena in Cluj-Napoca, Romania.

=== Results ===
Main card
Weight class				Method	Round	Time	Notes
Women's Bantamweight	(Romania) Cristina Stanciu	def.	(Romania) Diana Belbiţă	Submission (armbar)	1	2:41	(Note: For the vacant RXF Women's Bantamweight Championship.)
Super Heavyweight	(Romania) Alexandru Lungu	def.	(Poland) Andrzej Kulik	TKO (punches)	1	1:59
Heavyweight	(Romania) Robert Orbocea	def.	(Romania) Marian Rusu	TKO (punches)	1	3:25	(Note: For the vacant RXF Heavyweight Championship.)
Featherweight	(Romania) Florin Gârdan (c)	def.	(Romania) Ciprian Mariș	Decision (unanimous)	3	5:00	(Note: For the RXF Featherweight Championship.)
Middleweight	(Romania) Ciprian Chiru (c)	def.	(Romania) Sergiu Breb	Decision (majority)	3	5:00	(Note: For the RXF Middleweight Championship.)
Light Heavyweight	(Romania) Adrian Preda	def.	(Turkey) Ibrahim Telli	Submission (armbar)	1	4:47
Heavyweight	(Poland) Tomasz Czerwiński	def.	(Romania) Petru Ursachi	Submission (guillotine choke)	1	2:20
Welterweight	(Romania) Dorin Stan	def.	(Romania) Marius Tiţă	TKO (punches)	2	0:42
Welterweight	(Romania) George Peintinger	def.	(Hungary) Kálmán Kovács	TKO (punches)	2	4:10
Middleweight	(Romania) Izidor Bunea	def.	(Romania) Daniel Alexandru	Submission (guillotine choke)	1	4:47
Lightweight	(Hungary) Zoltán Turai	def.	(Romania) Traian Rus	Submission (guillotine choke)	3	2:15
Middleweight	(Israel) Jackie Gosh	def.	(Romania) Ciprian Rață	Submission (guillotine choke)	1	2:54
Featherweight	(Romania) Ioan Vrânceanu	def.	(Romania) Bogdan Nuț	KO (punch)	3	2:36
Welterweight	(Moldova) Sergiu Barbarosa	def.	(Hungary) Róbert Kertész	Submission (guillotine choke)	1	3:56
Heavyweight	(Hungary) Istvan Ruzsinszky	def.	(Romania) Mihai Drăgan	Submission (guillotine choke)	1	2:42

== RXF 19 ==
RXF 19: Galați
- Promotion: RXF
- Date: August 31, 2015
- Venue: Dunărea Ice Arena
- City: Galați, Romania

Event chronology
RXF 18: Stanciu vs. Belbiță	RXF 19: Galați	RXF 20: Verhoeven vs. Bogutzki

RXF 19: Galați was a mixed martial arts event that took place on August 31, 2015, at the Dunărea Ice Arena in Galați, Romania.

=== Results ===
Main card
Weight class				Method	Round	Time	Notes
Super Heavyweight	(Romania) Alexandru Lungu	def.	(Egypt) Mahmoud Hassan	Submission (north-south choke)	1	2:43
Women's Flyweight	(Romania) Cristina Stanciu	def.	(Hungary) Irén Rácz	Submission (triangle choke)	1	2:25
Featherweight	(Canada) Josh Hill	def.	(Romania) Ioan Vrânceanu	Decision (unanimous)	3	5:00
Welterweight	(United States) Michael Brightmon	def.	(Moldova) Andrei Barbarosa	TKO (punches)	1	0:59
Middleweight	(Romania) Sergiu Breb	def.	(Romania) Alexandru Ianțoc	Submission (guillotine choke)	1	3:28
Welterweight	(Romania) Adrian Grec	def.	(Romania) Silviu Cudalbu	Submission (guillotine choke)	1	4:18
Featherweight	(Romania) Rayko Levițchi	def.	(Romania) Alexandru Mezei	KO (punch)	1	2:09
Heavyweight	(Romania) Cătălin Alecsuți	def.	(Hungary) Istvan Ruzsinszky	Decision (majority)	3	5:00
Lightweight	(Romania) Adrian Sturzu	def.	(Romania) Liviu Sugacevschi	Submission (armbar)	1	3:04
Welterweight	(Romania) Aurel Pîrtea	def.	(Canada) Bentaiba Abdelkader	TKO (punches)	1	1:05

== RXF 20 ==
RXF 20: Verhoeven vs. Bogutzki
- Promotion: RXF
- Date: October 19, 2015
- Venue: Sala Transilvania
- City: Sibiu, Romania
- Attendance: 4,000

Event chronology
RXF 19: Galați	RXF 20: Verhoeven vs. Bogutzki	RXF 21: All Stars

RXF 20: Verhoeven vs. Bogutzki (also known as The Champion Is Here) was a mixed martial arts event that took place on October 19, 2015, at the Sala Transilvania in Sibiu, Romania.

The event marked the MMA debut for the No. 1 heavyweight kickboxer in the world Rico Verhoeven.

=== Results ===
Main card
Weight class				Method	Round	Time	Notes
Heavyweight	(Netherlands) Rico Verhoeven	def.	(Russia) Viktor Bogutzki	TKO (punches)	1	2:11
Middleweight	(Romania) Sergiu Breb	def.	(Romania) Ciprian Chiru (c)	TKO (punches and elbows)	2	3:47	(Note: For the RXF Middleweight Championship.)
Featherweight	(Hungary) Zoltán Turai	def.	(Romania) Ionuț Atodiresei	Decision (unanimous)	3	5:00
Heavyweight	(Romania) Anatoli Ciumac	vs.	(Poland) Przemysław Mysiala	Draw	3	5:00
Lightweight	(Romania) Adrian Sturzu	def.	(Romania) Cătălin Miron	Decision (unanimous)	3	5:00	(Note: For the vacant RXF Lightweight Championship.)
Featherweight	(Romania) Ioan Vrânceanu	def.	(Hungary) Zoltán Hegedűs	TKO (punches)	1	1:56
Heavyweight	(Romania) Zsolt Balla	def.	(Poland) Maciej Sosnowski	TKO (punches)	1	4:36
Welterweight	(Moldova) Sergiu Barbarosa	def.	(Hungary) Kálmán Kovács	TKO (punches)	1	1:29
Middleweight	(Israel) Jackie Gosh	def.	(Romania) Alexandru Ianțoc	Submission (guillotine choke)	2	4:25
Preliminary Card
Welterweight	(Romania) Andrei Vasinca	def.	(Romania) Daniel Stinghe	Submission (guillotine choke)	2	2:30
Lightweight	(Romania) Dragan Boț	def.	(Romania) Răzvan Nițu	TKO (corner stoppage)	2	5:00

== RXF 21 ==
RXF 21: All Stars
- Promotion: RXF
- Date: December 14, 2015
- Venue: Sala Polivalentă
- City: Bucharest, Romania

Event chronology
RXF 17: Craiova	RXF 21: All Stars	RXF 22: Romania vs. Poland

RXF 21: All Stars was a mixed martial arts event that took place on December 14, 2015, at the Sala Polivalentă in Bucharest, Romania.

=== Results ===
Main card
Weight class				Method	Round	Time	Notes
Super Heavyweight	(Poland) Michał Wlazło	def.	(Romania) Alexandru Lungu	TKO (punches)	2	3:11
Women's Flyweight	(Romania) Cristina Stanciu	def.	(Hungary) Renáta Cseh-Lantos	Submission (armbar)	1	3:13
Light Heavyweight	(Romania) Adrian Preda (c)	def.	(England) Marvin Campbell	Submission (keylock)	1	2:05	(Note: For the RXF Light Heavyweight Championship.)
Featherweight	(Romania) Florin Gârdan (c)	def.	(Romania) Ioan Vrânceanu	Decision (unanimous)	3	5:00	(Note: For the RXF Featherweight Championship.)
Heavyweight	(Romania) Anatoli Ciumac	def.	(Poland) Łukasz Parobiec	Decision (split)	3	5:00
Featherweight	(Romania) Ionuț Atodiresei	def.	(Hungary) Róbert Micura	Submission (armbar)	1	1:36
Welterweight	(Romania) Aurel Pîrtea	def.	(Romania) Paul Toma	Submission (guillotine choke)	1	0:21
Heavyweight	(Hungary) Istvan Ruzsinszky	def.	(Romania) Marian Iordan	TKO (retirement)	1	5:00
Lightweight	(Romania) Ciprian Cărăușu	def.	(Romania) Alexandru Popescu	Submission (armbar)	1	3:43
Welterweight	(Romania) Andrei Vasinca	def.	(Romania) Laurențiu Călugăru	Decision (unanimous)	3	5:00

== See also ==
- 2015 in UFC
- 2015 in Bellator MMA
- 2015 in ONE Championship
- 2015 in Absolute Championship Berkut
- 2015 in Konfrontacja Sztuk Walki
- 2015 in Romanian kickboxing
