= Nicolae Negumereanu =

Romanian mixed martial arts fighter

- Born: Nicolae Negumereanu; September 4, 1994 (age 32); Brașov, Romania
- Nationality: Romanian
- Height: 6 ft 0 in (1.83 m)
- Weight: 206 lb (93 kg; 14.7 st)
- Division: Heavyweight; Light Heavyweight
- Reach: 74 in (188 cm)
- Style: Wrestling
- Fighting out of: Brașov, Romania
- Team: Corona Brașov
- Trainer: Ninel Ianculescu
- Wrestling: Freestyle Wrestling
- Years active: 2016–2022

Mixed martial arts record
- Total: 15
- Wins: 13
- By knockout: 8
- By submission: 3
- By decision: 2
- Losses: 2
- By knockout: 1
- By decision: 1

Other information
- Spouse: Negumereanu Elena
- Mixed martial arts record from Sherdog

Nicolae Negumereanu (born September 4, 1994), commonly known as Nick Negumereanu, is a Romanian mixed martial artist (MMA) who competed in the Light heavyweight division in the UFC.

A former Real Xtreme Fighting (RXF) Light Heavyweight champion, Negumereanu is known for making his entrance in a traditional Dacian hat called pileus.

== Background ==
Starting wrestling when he was 15 years old, he was able to become a national wrestling champion and a national kempo champion. He changed his mind and shifted his focus to MMA after seeing one of his friends compete at an RXF show.

== Mixed martial arts career ==
=== Early career ===
He made his pro-MMA debut on October 10, 2016, against Alexandru Gavrila. Nicolae was victorious in his first MMA bout via a TKO. He went undefeated fighting mostly in Real Xtreme Fighting, with some of the opponents that he defeated being Marius Pîslaru, Constantin Pădure, Robert Orbocea, Yuri Gorbenko, and Kovács Kálmán. On November 19, 2018, he defeated Dan Konecke via Brabo Choke at RXF 32 to capture his first MMA title, the RXF Light Heavyweight Championship.

=== Ultimate Fighting Championship ===
Negumereanu, as a last-minute replacement for Gökhan Saki, faced Saparbek Safarov on March 16, 2019, at UFC Fight Night: Till vs. Masvidal in London, England. Negumereanu lost the fight by unanimous decision.

Due to two surgeries, one on his back and one on his knee, he would miss the next two years. Negumereanu stated that he accepted the fight with Safarov only three weeks before, and he fought with a cracked hand and a cold. Later he also said that he was coming to the match with Villanueva after a meniscus operation but he did not want to cancel the match, entering unprepared again but this time winning the match.

Negumereanu faced Aleksa Camur at UFC on ESPN: The Korean Zombie vs. Ige on June 19, 2021. He won the bout via split decision. This fight had its fair share of controversy after Negumereanu repeatedly illegally held holding Camur against the fence.

Negumereanu faced Ike Villanueva on October 23, 2021, at UFC Fight Night: Costa vs. Vettori. He won the fight via knockout in round one.

Negumereanu was scheduled to face Ihor Potieria on March 5, 2022, at UFC 272. However, Potieria pulled out of the bout and was replaced by Kennedy Nzechukwu. Negumereanu won the fight via split decision. 8 out of 15 media scores gave it to Nzechukwu, while 6 scored it a draw, with only one giving it to Negumereanu.

Negumereanu was scheduled to face Alonzo Menifield on June 4, 2022, at UFC Fight Night 207. However, Negumereanu was removed from the event for undisclosed reasons and he was replaced by Askar Mozharov.

Negumereanu faced Ihor Potieria on July 30, 2022 at UFC 277. He won the fight via technical knockout in the second round.

Negumereanu faced Carlos Ulberg on November 12, 2022, at UFC 281. He lost the fight via knockout in the first round.

== Personal life ==
He has 3 brothers, their father died when Nicolae was 10 years old. Negumereanu worked from the age of 14-15 to support his family. He declared that if he had had better performances in wrestling than being national champion, he probably would not have started MMA. He was active in wrestling for only 4–5 years and already after 2 years he started defeating opponents with 10 years of experience. Later, Negumereanu also studied BJJ in Brașov, Romania. He also said that MMA is not developed in Romania, unlike the much more popular kickboxing, and that it has only been practiced for 5 years. At one point, Negumereanu trained only on the striking part of kickboxing, and the former coach did not manage to improve his ground part.

He also trained at the UFC Performance Institute.

Nicolae Negumereanu is an Eastern Orthodox Christian. He said his idol is Lucian Bute, and that he was also inspired by Leonard Dorin Doroftei and Alexandru Lungu. He would like to end up like Conor McGregor and have a match with Jon Jones.

Nicolae says that he is passionate about Dacian culture (Dacology) and listens to Subcarpați's music. He worked for many years as a security guard.

== Championships and accomplishments ==
=== Mixed martial arts ===
- Real Xtreme Fighting
  - RXF Light Heavyweight Championship (One Time)

== Mixed martial arts record ==
Professional record breakdown
| 15 matches | 13 wins | 2 losses |
| By knockout | 8 | 1 |
| By submission | 3 | 0 |
| By decision | 2 | 1 |

| Res. | Record | Opponent | Method | Event | Date | Round | Time | Location | Notes |
|---|---|---|---|---|---|---|---|---|---|
| Loss | 13–2 | Carlos Ulberg | KO (punches) | UFC 281 | November 12, 2022 | 1 | 3:44 | New York City, New York, United States | |
| Win | 13–1 | Ihor Potieria | TKO (knees and punches) | UFC 277 | July 30, 2022 | 2 | 3:33 | Dallas, Texas, United States | |
| Win | 12–1 | Kennedy Nzechukwu | Decision (split) | UFC 272 | March 5, 2022 | 3 | 5:00 | Las Vegas, Nevada, United States | Nzechukwu was deducted one point in round 3 due to repeated eye pokes. |
| Win | 11–1 | Ike Villanueva | TKO (punches) | UFC Fight Night: Costa vs. Vettori | October 23, 2021 | 1 | 1:18 | Las Vegas, Nevada, United States | |
| Win | 10–1 | Aleksa Camur | Decision (split) | UFC on ESPN: The Korean Zombie vs. Ige | June 19, 2021 | 3 | 5:00 | Las Vegas, Nevada, United States | |
| Loss | 9–1 | Saparbek Safarov | Decision (unanimous) | UFC Fight Night: Till vs. Masvidal | March 16, 2019 | 3 | 5:00 | London, England | Safarov was deducted one point in round 1 for continuously grabbing the cage. |
| Win | 9–0 | Dan Konecke | Submission (brabo choke) | RXF 32 | November 19, 2018 | 2 | 0:30 | Brașov, Romania | Won the RXF Light Heavyweight Championship. |
| Win | 8–0 | Kálmán Kovács | Submission (rear-naked choke) | RXF 31 | October 1, 2018 | 1 | 3:12 | Cluj-Napoca, Romania | Heavyweight bout. |
| Win | 7–0 | Olutobi Ayodeji Kalejaiye | TKO (punches) | RXF 29 | December 18, 2017 | 2 | 3:04 | Brașov, Romania | Light Heavyweight debut. |
| Win | 6–0 | Yuri Gorbenko | TKO (retirement) | RXF 28 | October 30, 2017 | 2 | 5:00 | Brașov, Romania | |
| Win | 5–0 | Hatef Moeil | TKO (doctor stoppage) | Superior FC 18 | September 16, 2017 | 1 | 2:35 | Ludwigshafen, Germany | |
| Win | 4–0 | Robert Orbocea | TKO (punches) | RXF 27 | July 29, 2017 | 1 | 1:55 | Piatra Neamț, Romania | |
| Win | 3–0 | Constantin Pădure | Submission (armbar) | RXF 26 | April 25, 2017 | 2 | 1:08 | Brașov, Romania | |
| Win | 2–0 | Marius Pîslaru | TKO (punches) | RXF 25 | December 19, 2016 | 1 | 0:57 | Ploiești, Romania | |
| Win | 1–0 | Alex Gavrilă | TKO (punches) | RXF 24 | October 10, 2016 | 1 | 0:10 | Brașov, Romania | Heavyweight debut. |

== See also ==
- List of male mixed martial artists
