= 2014 in RXF =

Mixed martial arts events

- Genre: Sports
- Created by: Sebastian Vieru
- Country of origin: Romania

Original release
- Network: Sport.ro
- Release: January 31 – December 15, 2014

2014 was the 3rd year in the history of RXF, the largest mixed martial arts promotion based in Romania.

== List of events ==
#	Event Title	Date	Arena	Location
1	RXF 15: All Stars	December 15, 2014	Sala Polivalentă	Bucharest, Romania
2	RXF 14: Sibiu	November 3, 2014	Sala Transilvania	Sibiu, Romania
3	RXF 13: Fight Night Moldavia	October 6, 2014	Elisabeta Lipă Arena	Botoșani, Romania
4	RXF 12: Mamaia	August 4, 2014	Piațeta Cazino	Mamaia, Constanța, Romania
5	RXF 11: Mountain Fight	May 31, 2014	Brașov Ice Arena	Brașov, Romania
6	RXF 10: Pascu vs. Bunea	April 5, 2014	Sala Polivalentă	Drobeta-Turnu Severin, Romania
7	RXF 9: Romania vs. Hungary	January 31, 2014	Sala Polivalentă	Craiova, Romania

== RXF 9 ==
RXF 9: Romania vs. Hungary
- Promotion: RXF
- Date: January 31, 2014
- Venue: Sala Polivalentă
- City: Craiova, Romania
- Attendance: 3,000

Event chronology
RXF 8: All Stars	RXF 9: Romania vs. Hungary	RXF 10: Pascu vs. Bunea

RXF 9: Romania vs. Hungary was a mixed martial arts event that took place on January 31, 2014, at the Sala Polivalentă in Craiova, Romania.

=== Results ===
Main card
Weight class				Method	Round	Time	Notes
Heavyweight	(Romania) Zsolt Balla	def.	(Hungary) János Finfera	TKO	1
Super Heavyweight	(Hungary) István Ruzsinszky	def.	(Romania) Alexandru Gabroveanu	TKO	2
Light Heavyweight	(Romania) Sergiu Breb	def.	(Hungary) Viktor Kiss	TKO
Middleweight	(Romania) Alexandru Ianţoc	def.	(Hungary) Ernő Stefkó	TKO	1
Bantamweight	(Romania) Sorin Tănăsie	def.	(Romania) Cristian Nicolae	KO	1
Lightweight	(Romania) Cătălin Miron	def.	(Romania) Albert Paul	KO	1
Featherweight	(Romania) Florin Gârdan	def.	(Romania) Marius Ciocârla	TKO	3
Welterweight	(Romania) Răzvan Tudora	def.	(Romania) Daniel Mocanu	Submission (guillotine choke)	1
Women's Bantamweight	(Romania) Alice Ardelean	def.	(Romania) Roxana Crişan	KO	1
Featherweight	(Romania) Bogdan Barbu	def.	(Romania) Răzvan Duță	Submission (guillotine choke)	2
Welterweight	(Romania) Răzvan Radu	def.	(Romania) Ionuţ Gelep	KO	1

== RXF 10 ==
RXF 10: Pascu vs. Bunea
- Promotion: RXF
- Date: April 5, 2014
- Venue: Sala Polivalentă
- City: Drobeta-Turnu Severin, Romania

Event chronology
RXF 9: Romania vs. Hungary	RXF 10: Pascu vs. Bunea	RXF 11: Mountain Fight

RXF 10: Pascu vs. Bunea was a mixed martial arts event that took place on April 5, 2014, at the Sala Polivalentă in Drobeta-Turnu Severin, Romania.

=== Results ===
Main card
Weight class				Method	Round	Time	Notes
Weltereight	(Romania) Ion Pascu	def.	(Romania) Izidor Bunea	Submission (armbar)	1	2:18
Light Heavyweight	(Romania) Adrian Preda	def.	(Romania) Marius Munteanu	TKO (punches)	1	1:32
Light Heavyweight	(Romania) Sergiu Breb	def.	(Romania) Mihai Simion	TKO (retirement)	1	5:00
Featherweight	(Romania) Florin Gârdan	def.	(Romania) Ioan Vrânceanu	TKO (punches)	2	0:55
Featherweight	(Romania) Bogdan Barbu	def.	(Romania) Rayko Levițchi	TKO (punches)	3	3:15
Lightweight	(Romania) Bogdan Stanciu	def.	(Romania) Răzvan Radu	TKO (punches)	1	2:26
Lightweight	(Romania) Dinu Bucaleț	def.	(Romania) László Forró	Submission (armbar)	1	1:33
Women's Bantamweight	(Romania) Diana Belbiţă	def.	(Romania) Roxana Crișan	TKO (punches)	1	1:22
Featherweight	(Romania) Virgil Munteanu	def.	(Romania) Andrei Beldean	TKO (punches)	1	1:08
Featherweight	(Romania) Teofil Bădeliţa	def.	(Romania) Alexandru Mezei	TKO (punches)	2	0:59

== RXF 11 ==
RXF 11: Mountain Fight
- Promotion: RXF
- Date: May 31, 2014
- Venue: Brașov Ice Arena
- City: Brașov, Romania

Event chronology
RXF 10: Pascu vs. Bunea	RXF 11: Mountain Fight	RXF 12: Mamaia

RXF 11: Mountain Fight was a mixed martial arts event that took place on May 31, 2014, at the Brașov Ice Arena in Brașov, Romania.

=== Results ===
Main card
Weight class				Method	Round	Time	Notes
Lightweight	(United States) Michael Brightmon	def.	(Romania) Flavius Predoi	Submission (keylock)	2	1:51
Women's Bantamweight	(United States) Claire Henry	def.	(Romania) Alice Ardelean	Submission (keylock)	1	3:12
Welterweight	(Romania) Marius Tiţă	def.	(Romania) Bogdan Stanciu	TKO (punches)	1	0:50
Middleweight	(Romania) Ciprian Chiru	def.	(Romania) Daniel Stinghe	TKO (punches)	1	2:27
Middleweight	(Romania) Izidor Bunea	def.	(Romania) Sebastian Ion	TKO (punches)	1	0:15
Heavyweight	(Romania) Cristian Mitrea	def.	(Romania) Marius Panin	Submission (guillotine choke)	1	0:32
Heavyweight	(Romania) Nicolo Bonati	def.	(Romania) Alexandru Gabroveanu	Submission (keylock)	1	1:18
Middleweight	(Romania) Alexandru Gavrilă	def.	(Romania) George Bucur	TKO (punches)	1	0:49
Lightweight	(Romania) Andrei Vasinca	def.	(Romania) Ionuț Gelep	Submission (guillotine choke)	1	2:15
Featherweight	(Romania) Răzvan Duță	def.	(Romania) Lucian Mocănașu	Decision (unanimous)	3	5:00

== RXF 12 ==
RXF 12: Mamaia
- Promotion: RXF
- Date: August 4, 2014
- Venue: Piațeta Cazino
- City: Mamaia, Constanța, Romania
- Attendance: 10,000

Event chronology
RXF 11: Mountain Fight	RXF 12: Mamaia	RXF 13: Fight Night Moldavia

RXF 12: Mamaia was a mixed martial arts event that took place on August 4, 2014, at the Piațeta Cazino in Mamaia, Constanța, Romania.

=== Results ===
Main card
Weight class				Method	Round	Time	Notes
Super Heavyweight	(Poland) Tomasz Czerwiński	def.	(Romania) Alexandru Lungu	TKO (punches)	1	4:25
Featherweight	(Romania) Ioan Vrânceanu	def.	(Romania) Rayko Levițchi	Decision (unanimous)	3	5:00
Welterweight	(United States) Michael Brightmon	def.	(Romania) Cătălin Miron	Decision (split)	3	5:00
Welterweight	(Romania) Andrei Vasinca	def.	(Romania) Liviu Popa	Decision (unanimous)	3	5:00
Lightweight	(Romania) Adrian Grec	def.	(Romania) Dan Mătuşa	Submission (guillotine choke)	1	1:26
Lightweight	(Romania) Cătălin Cășaru	def.	(Romania) Răzvan Radu	TKO (Punches)	1	2:07
Middleweight	(Romania) Alexandru Gavrilă	def.	(Romania) Ionuț Oprea	Submission (guillotine choke)	1	2:36
Preliminary Card
Light Heavyweight	(Romania) Robert Orbocea	def.	(Romania) Marian Constantin	Submission (guillotine choke)	1	0:46
Women's Bantamweight	(Romania) Diana Belbiţă	def.	(Romania) Roxana Dinescu	Submission (armbar)	2	4:12
Featherweight	(Romania) Alexandru Mezei	def.	(Romania) Răzvan Stinghe	Submission (armbar)	3	2:54

== RXF 13 ==
RXF 13: Fight Night Moldavia
- Promotion: RXF
- Date: October 6, 2014
- Venue: Elisabeta Lipă Arena
- City: Botoșani, Romania

Event chronology
RXF 12: Mamaia	RXF 13: Fight Night Moldavia	RXF 14: Sibiu

RXF 13: Fight Night Moldavia was a mixed martial arts event that took place on October 6, 2014, at the Elisabeta Lipă Arena in Botoșani, Romania.

=== Results ===
Main card
Weight class				Method	Round	Time	Notes
Light Heavyweight	(Romania) Adrian Preda	def.	(Romania) Sergiu Breb	Decision (unanimous)	3	5:00
Featherweight	(Hungary) Zsolt Fényes	def.	(Romania) Ionuț Atodiresei	Submission (guillotine choke)	1	3:07
Super Heavyweight	(Romania) Gheorghe Ignat	def.	(Hungary) Istvan Ruzsinszki	TKO (punches)	1	0:27
Featherweight	(Hungary) Áron Szilágyi	vs.	(Romania) Florin Lupu	Submission (guillotine choke)	3	0:27
Featherweight	(Romania) Rayko Leviţchi	def.	(Hungary) Róbert Micura	TKO (punches)	1	4:09
Lightweight	(Romania) Adrian Sturzu	def.	(Hungary) Zoltán Turai	Decision (unanimous)	3	5:00
Women's Bantamweight	(Romania) Cristina Stanciu	def.	(Romania) Gabriela Iacob	TKO (punches)	1	0:33
Middleweight	(Romania) Mircea Cristian	def.	(Romania) Ali Horvat	TKO (punches)	1	1:11
Welterweight	(Romania) Laurențiu Călugăru	def.	(Romania) Daniel Mocanu	TKO (punches)	1	0:50
Lightweight	(Romania) Bogdan Nuț	def.	(Romania) Gabriel Apreutesei	Submission (guillotine choke)	2	4:25

== RXF 14 ==
RXF 14: Sibiu
- Promotion: RXF
- Date: November 3, 2014
- Venue: Sala Transilvania
- City: Sibiu, Romania

Event chronology
RXF 13: Fight Night Moldavia	RXF 14: Sibiu	RXF 15: All Stars

RXF 14: Sibiu was a mixed martial arts event that took place on November 3, 2014, at the Sala Transilvania in Sibiu, Romania.

=== Results ===
Main card
Weight class				Method	Round	Time	Notes
Heavyweight	(Romania) Cristian Mitrea	def.	(Romania) Marian Rusu	TKO (punches)	1	0:41	(Note: For the vacant RXF Heavyweight Championship.)
Middleweight	(Romania) Ion Pascu	def.	(Hungary) Ernő Stefkó	TKO (knees and punches)	1	0:23
Middleweight	(Romania) Ciprian Chiru	def.	(Romania) Izidor Bunea	Submission (keylock)	1	4:35	(Note: For the vacant RXF Middleweight Championship.)
Welterweight	(United States) Michael Brightmon	def.	(Romania) Andrei Vasinca	Submission (guillotine choke)	1	1:44	(Note: For the vacant RXF Welterweight Championship.)
Lightweight	(Romania) Traian Rus	def.	(Hungary) Zoltán Hegedűs	TKO (punches)	1	0:47
Women's Bantamweight	(Romania) Diana Belbiţă	def.	(Romania) Alice Ardelean	Submission (armbar)	2	3:05
Welterweight	(Romania) Cătălin Miron	def.	(Romania) Liviu Popa	Decision (unanimous)	3	5:00
Featherweight	(Romania) Ciprian Mariș	def.	(Romania) Ioan Vrânceanu	Decision (split)	3	5:00
Preliminary Card
Light Heavyweight	(Romania) Raul Sabou	def.	(Romania) Marius Munteanu	Submission (armbar)	1	1:15
Women's Bantamweight	(Romania) Roxana Dinescu	def.	(Romania) Roxana Crișan	Submission (guillotine choke)	1	3:46
Featherweight	(Romania) Alexandru Mezei	def.	(Romania) Marius Ciocârlă	Submission (heel hook)	2	0:55

== RXF 15 ==
RXF 15: All Stars
- Promotion: RXF
- Date: December 15, 2014
- Venue: Sala Polivalentă
- City: Bucharest, Romania
- Attendance: 5,000

Event chronology
RXF 14: Sibiu	RXF 15: All Stars	RXF 16: Brașov

RXF 15: All Stars was a mixed martial arts event that took place on December 15, 2014, at the Sala Polivalentă in Bucharest, Romania.

=== Results ===
Main card
Weight class				Method	Round	Time	Notes
Super Heavyweight	(Romania) Alexandru Lungu	def.	(United States) Mighty Mo	TKO (punches)	1	0:52
Middleweight	(Romania) Ion Pascu	def.	(Spain) Felipe Nsue	Submission (armbar)	1	4:56
Featherweight	(Romania) Ionuț Atodiresei	def.	(Hungary) Omar Hamodi	KO (punch)	1	0:03
Light Heavyweight	(Romania) Adrian Preda	def.	(Hungary) János Finfera	TKO (punches)	1	1:59
Welterweight	(Romania) Marius Tiţă	def.	(Israel) Moishi Rand	Submission (guillotine choke)	3	0:51
Lightweight	(Romania) Cătălin Cășaru	def.	(Romania) Adrian Grec	Decision (unanimous)	3	5:00	(Note: For the RXF Lightweight Championship.)
Featherweight	(Romania) Florin Gârdan	def.	(Romania) Bogdan Barbu	Decision (split)	3	5:00	(Note: For the RXF Featherweight Championship.)
Heavyweight	(Romania) Marian Rusu	def.	(England) Tony Louis	TKO (punches)	2	0:15
Heavyweight	(Romania) Anatoli Ciumac	def.	(Poland) Tomasz Czerwiński	TKO (arm injury)	3	2:21
Heavyweight	(Romania) Mihai Joltea	def.	(Romania) Ovidiu Buzulică	TKO (punches)	1	1:16
Light Heavyweight	(Romania) Sergiu Breb	def.	(Moldova) Victor Bargan	TKO (punches)	1	1:56
Heavyweight	(Romania) Robert Orbocea	def.	(Romania) Raul Sabou	KO (punch)	1	0:06
Lightweight	(Romania) Dan Fâșie	def.	(Romania) Marian Bontoș	Submission (armbar)	1	1:46
Heavyweight	(Hungary) Istvan Ruzsinszky	def.	(Romania) Cristian Anheliuc	TKO (punches)	3	1:38

== See also ==
- 2014 in UFC
- 2014 in Bellator MMA
- 2014 in ONE Championship
- 2014 in Absolute Championship Berkut
- 2014 in Konfrontacja Sztuk Walki
- 2014 in Romanian kickboxing
