= 2016 in RXF =

Mixed martial arts events

- Genre: Sports
- Created by: Sebastian Vieru
- Country of origin: Romania

Original release
- Release: March 21 – December 19, 2016

2016 was the 5th year in the history of RXF, the largest mixed martial arts promotion based in Romania.

== List of events ==
| # | Event title | Date | Arena | Location |
|---|---|---|---|---|
| 1 | RXF 25: All Stars | December 19, 2016 | Olimpia Arena | Ploiești, Romania |
| 2 | RXF 24: Brașov | October 10, 2016 | Dumitru Popescu Arena | Brașov, Romania |
| 3 | RXF 23: Romania vs. United Kingdom | June 6, 2016 | Sala Polivalentă | Bucharest, Romania |
| 4 | RXF 22: Romania vs. Poland | March 21, 2016 | Bucharest Metropolitan Circus | Bucharest, Romania |

== RXF 22 ==
RXF 22: Romania vs. Poland
- Promotion: RXF
- Date: March 21, 2016
- Venue: Bucharest Metropolitan Circus
- City: Bucharest, Romania
- Attendance: 2,500

Event chronology
| RXF 21: All Stars | RXF 22: Romania vs. Poland | RXF 23: Romania vs. United Kingdom |

RXF 22: Romania vs. Poland was a mixed martial arts event that took place on March 21, 2016 at the Bucharest Metropolitan Circus in Bucharest, Romania.

=== Results ===
Main card
| Weight class | | | | Method | Round | Time | Notes |
|---|---|---|---|---|---|---|---|
| Welterweight | (Romania) Aurel Pîrtea | def. | (United States) Michael Brightmon (c) | Submission (guillotine choke) | 1 | 2:39 | (Note: For the RXF Welterweight Championship.) |
| Women's Bantamweight | (Romania) Diana Belbiţă | def. | (Poland) Paulina Borkowska | TKO (head Kick and punches) | 1 | 4:00 |
| Heavyweight | (Romania) Anatoli Ciumac | def. | (Poland) Janusz Dylewski | Submission (keylock) | 1 | 3:34 |
| Featherweight | (Romania) Ionuț Atodiresei | def. | (Poland) Azamat Mustafaev | Submission (armbar) | 3 | 4:59 |
| Featherweight | (Romania) Ioan Vrânceanu | def. | (Poland) Sławomir Szczepański | TKO (punches) | 1 | 0:56 |
| Welterweight | (Poland) Rafał Raczyński | def. | (Romania) Ciprian Rață | Submission (guillotine choke) | 2 | 1:05 |
| Lightweight | (Romania) Cătălin Cășaru | def. | (Poland) Daniel Chrzanowski | TKO (punches) | 1 | 1:58 |
Preliminary Card
| Welterweight | (Romania) Daniel Stinghe | def. | (Romania) George Peintinger | TKO (punches) | 1 | 2:28 |
| Welterweight | (Romania) Adrian Grec | def. | (Romania) Andrei Vasinca | Decision (unanimous) | 3 | 5:00 |

== RXF 23 ==
RXF 23: Romania vs. United Kingdom
- Promotion: RXF
- Date: June 6, 2016
- Venue: Sala Polivalentă
- City: Bucharest, Romania

Event chronology
| RXF 22: Romania vs. Poland | RXF 23: Romania vs. United Kingdom | RXF 24: Brașov |

RXF 23: Romania vs. United Kingdom (also known as Judgment Day) was a mixed martial arts event that took place on June 6, 2016 at the Sala Polivalentă in Bucharest, Romania.

=== Results ===
Main card
| Weight class | | | | Method | Round | Time | Notes |
|---|---|---|---|---|---|---|---|
| Heavyweight | (Romania) Anatoli Ciumac | def. | (Romania) Robert Orbocea (c) | TKO (punches) | 1 | 2:54 | (Note: For the RXF Heavyweight Championship.) |
| Women's Bantamweight | (Romania) Diana Belbiţă | def. | (Hungary) Virág Furó | TKO (elbows) | 1 | 2:08 |
| Light Heavyweight | (Romania) Cristian Mitrea | def. | (Bosnia and Herzegovina) Saša Dajić | TKO (punches) | 1 | 2:15 |
| Light Heavyweight | (Romania) Adrian Preda | def. | (England) Tristan Tate | TKO (punches) | 1 | 1:56 |
| Middleweight | (Romania) Sergiu Breb | def. | (England) Dom Clark | Submission (guillotine choke) | 1 | 2:13 |
| Lightweight | (England) Jordan Miller | def. | (Romania) Adrian Sturzu | Decision (split) | 3 | 5:00 |
| Featherweight | (Serbia) Dragan Pešić | def. | (Romania) Ioan Vrânceanu | DQ (illegal knee) | 1 | 3:13 |
| Featherweight | (Canada) Will Romero | def. | (Hungary) Zsolt Fényes | Decision (unanimous) | 3 | 5:00 |
| Featherweight | (Canada) Kyle Nelson | def. | (Hungary) Zoltán Turi | Submission (rear-naked choke) | 3 | 1:23 |
Preliminary Card
| Welterweight | (Romania) Ionuț Munteanu | def. | (Romania) Adelin Mihăilă | Submission (guillotine choke) | 1 | 1:54 |

== RXF 24 ==
RXF 24: Brașov
- Promotion: RXF
- Date: October 10, 2016
- Venue: Dumitru Popescu Arena
- City: Brașov, Romania

Event chronology
| RXF 23: Romania vs. United Kingdom | RXF 24: Brașov | RXF 25: All Stars |

RXF 24: Brașov was a mixed martial arts event that took place on October 10, 2016 at the Dumitru Popescu Arena in Brașov, Romania.

=== Results ===
Main card
| Weight class | | | | Method | Round | Time | Notes |
|---|---|---|---|---|---|---|---|
| Super Heavyweight | (Romania) Alexandru Lungu | def. | (Switzerland) Papis Konez | TKO (punches) | 1 | 2:05 |
| Heavyweight | (Romania) Anatoli Ciumac | def. | (Ukraine) Yuri Gorbenko | Submission (heel hook) | 1 | 0:49 |
| Light Heavyweight | (Romania) Cristian Mitrea | def. | (Wales) Ben Schneider | TKO (punches) | 1 | 1:26 |
| Welterweight | (Romania) Aurel Pîrtea | def. | (England) Jordan Miller | Submission (guillotine choke) | 2 | 2:59 |
| Welterweight | (Romania) Andrei Vasinca | def. | (Romania) Daniel Stinghe | TKO (punches) | 3 | 2:55 |
| Bantamweight | (Canada) Gabe Sagman | def. | (Romania) Constantin Pîrtea | Submission (guillotine choke) | 1 | 3:31 |
| Featherweight | (Brazil) Ralph Ribeiro | def. | (Romania) Ioan Vrânceanu | TKO (Retirement) | 1 | 5:00 |
Preliminary Card
| Heavyweight | (Romania) Nicolae Negumereanu | def. | (Romania) Alexandru Gavrilă | TKO (punches) | 1 | 0:10 |
| Welterweight | (Romania) Alexandru Atănăsoaie | def. | (Romania) Radu Dorobanț | TKO (retirement) | 2 | 5:00 |
| Featherweight | (Romania) Sorin Pop | def. | (Romania) Răzvan Stinghe | Submission (guillotine choke) | 1 | 4:09 |

== RXF 25 ==
RXF 25: All Stars
- Promotion: RXF
- Date: December 19, 2016
- Venue: Olimpia Arena
- City: Ploiești, Romania

Event chronology
| RXF 24: Brașov | RXF 25: All Stars | RXF 26: Brașov |

RXF 25: All Stars was a mixed martial arts event that took place on December 19, 2016 at the Olimpia Arena in Ploiești, Romania.

=== Results ===
Main card
| Weight class | | | | Method | Round | Time | Notes |
|---|---|---|---|---|---|---|---|
| Heavyweight | (Romania) Anatoli Ciumac (c) | def. | (Poland) Michał Wlazło | Decision (unanimous) | 3 | 5:00 | (Note: For the RXF Heavyweight Championship.) |
| Super Heavyweight | (Romania) Alexandru Lungu | def. | (England) John Painter | TKO (punches) | 1 | 0:26 |
| Light Heavyweight | (Germany) Dan Konecke | def. | (Romania) Adrian Preda (c) | Submission (heel hook) | 1 | 3:08 | (Note: For the RXF Light Heavyweight Championship.) |
| Light Heavyweight | (England) Luke Barnatt | def. | (Romania) Cristian Mitrea | TKO (punches) | 1 | 3:00 |
| Welterweight | (Romania) Aurel Pîrtea | def. | (Hungary) Péter Guzsván | Submission (armbar) | 1 | 3:43 |
| Bantamweight | (Romania) Ciprian Mariș | def. | (Romania) Florin Lupu | Submission (armbar) | 1 | 1:05 |
| Welterweight | (Israel) Levi Matan | def. | (Romania) Andrei Vasinca | TKO (punches) | 3 | 3:07 |
| Lightweight | (Romania) Laurențiu Călugăru | def. | (Romania) Adrian Grec | Decision (unanimous) | 3 | 5:00 |
| Heavyweight | (Romania) Nicolae Negumereanu | def. | (Romania) Marius Pîslariu | TKO (punches) | 1 | 0:57 |

== See also ==
- 2016 in UFC
- 2016 in Bellator MMA
- 2016 in ONE Championship
- 2016 in Absolute Championship Berkut
- 2016 in Konfrontacja Sztuk Walki
- 2016 in Romanian kickboxing
