= 2017 in RXF =

Mixed martial arts events

- Genre: Sports
- Created by: Sebastian Vieru
- Country of origin: Romania

Original release
- Network: Sport.ro; Sport Klub; FITE TV
- Release: April 25 – December 18, 2017

2017 was the 6th year in the history of RXF, the largest mixed martial arts promotion based in Romania.

== List of events ==
#	Event title	Date	Arena	Location
1	RXF 29: All Stars	December 18, 2017	Lux Divina	Brașov, Romania
2	RXF 28: VIP Special Edition	October 30, 2017	Lux Divina	Brașov, Romania
3	RXF 27: Next Fighter	July 29, 2017	Sala Polivalentă	Piatra Neamț, Romania
4	RXF 26: Brașov	April 25, 2017	Dumitru Popescu Arena	Brașov, Romania

== RXF 26 ==
RXF 26: Brașov
- Promotion: RXF
- Date: April 25, 2017
- Venue: Dumitru Popescu Arena
- City: Brașov, Romania

Event chronology
RXF 25: All Stars	RXF 26: Brașov	RXF 27: Next Fighter

RXF 26: Brașov was a mixed martial arts event that took place on April 25, 2017, at the Dumitru Popescu Arena in Brașov, Romania.

=== Results ===
Main card
Weight class				Method	Round	Time	Notes
Heavyweight	(Romania) Anatoli Ciumac	def.	(England) Tony Mustard	Submission (armbar)	1	1:07
Lightweight	(Romania) Cătălin Cășaru	def.	(Romania) Adrian Grec	Decision (unanimous)	3	5:00	(Note: For the RXF Lightweight Championship.)
Bantamweight	(Romania) Bogdan Barbu	def.	(Romania) Ciprian Mariș	TKO (punches)	1	3:42	(Note: For the vacant RXF Bantamweight Championship.)
Middleweight	(Romania) Sergiu Breb	def.	(Hungary) Kálmán Kovács	TKO (punches)	1	3:33
Featherweight	(Romania) Ioan Vrânceanu	def.	(Bulgaria) Simeon Atanasov	TKO (punches)	1	1:08
Heavyweight	(Romania) Cristian Negoiţă	def.	(Wales) Ben Schneider	TKO (punches)	1	0:48
Heavyweight	(Romania) Nicolae Negumereanu	def.	(Moldova) Constantin Pădure	Submission (armbar)	2	1:08
Lightweight	(Canada) Kyle Nelson	def.	(Romania) Gabriel Mănucă	Submission (rear-naked choke)	1	3:50
Bantamweight	(Canada) Gabe Sagman	def.	(Romania) Cosmin Dușa	Submission (arm-triangle choke)	1	2:46
Preliminary Card
Welterweight	(Romania) Daniel Stinghe	def.	(Italy) Simone Verlingieri	TKO (punches)	2	4:26
Middleweight	(Romania) Alexandru Ianțoc	def.	(Romania) Marius Cantoneru	TKO	1	3:23
Lightweight	(Romania) Radu Dorobanț	def.	(Romania) Bogdan Nuț	TKO	2	2:46
Lightweight	(Romania) Alexandru Atănăsoaie	def.	(Romania) Bogdan Ferariu	Submission	1	4:20

== RXF 27 ==
RXF 27: Next Fighter
- Promotion: RXF
- Date: July 29, 2017
- Venue: Sala Polivalentă
- City: Piatra Neamț, Romania

Event chronology
RXF 26: Brașov	RXF 27: Next Fighter	RXF 28: VIP Special Edition

RXF 27: Next Fighter was a mixed martial arts event that took place on July 29, 2017, at the Sala Polivalentă in Piatra Neamț, Romania.

=== Results ===
Main card
Weight class				Method	Round	Time	Notes
Super Heavyweight	(Romania) Alexandru Lungu	def.	(Czech Republic) Martin Chuděj	TKO (punches)	2	1:36
Women's Flyweight	(Romania) Diana Belbiţă	def.	(France) Morgane Manfredi	Decision (majority)	3	5:00
Heavyweight	(Romania) Nicolae Negumereanu	def.	(Romania) Robert Orbocea	TKO (punches)	1	1:55
Featherweight	(Romania) Ioan Vrânceanu	def.	(Romania) Florin Lupu	Decision (unanimous)	3	5:00
Welterweight	(Romania) Florin Lambagiu	def.	(Hungary) Péter Guzsván	Decision (unanimous)	3	5:00
Welterweight	(Hungary) Lászlò Szögyényi	def.	(Romania) Andrei Vasinca	Submission (guillotine choke)	1	1:30

== RXF 28 ==
RXF 28: VIP Special Edition
- Promotion: RXF; SUPERKOMBAT
- Date: October 30, 2017
- Venue: Lux Divina
- City: Brașov, Romania

Event chronology
RXF 27: Next Fighter	RXF 28: VIP Special Edition	RXF 29: All Stars

RXF 28: VIP Special Edition was a mixed martial arts event that took place on October 30, 2017, at the Lux Divina in Brașov, Romania.

=== Results ===
Main card
Weight class				Method	Round	Time	Notes
Heavyweight	(Romania) Nicolae Negumereanu	def.	(Ukraine) Yuri Gorbenko	TKO (retirement)	2	5:00
Featherweight	(Romania) Ciprian Mariș	def.	(Hungary) Róbert Miczura	TKO (punches)	1	0:08
Welterweight	(Romania) Daniel Stinghe	def.	(Hungary) Kálmán Kovács	TKO (punches)	1	N/A
Lightweight	(Romania) Alexandru Atănăsoaie	def.	(Romania) Albert Paul	N/A	N/A	N/A
Welterweight	(Romania) Laurențiu Călugăru	def.	(Romania) Radu Dorobanț	N/A	N/A	N/A
Bantamweight	(Azerbaijan) İska İsmayilov	def.	(Romania) Răzvan Velcheran	N/A	N/A	N/A
Featherweight	(Romania) Alexandru Mezei	def.	(Romania) Sorinel Grancea	N/A	N/A	N/A
Open Weight	(Romania) Ion Grigore	def.	(Hungary) István Ruzsinszky	N/A	N/A	N/A

== RXF 29 ==
RXF 29: All Stars
- Promotion: RXF; Magnum FC
- Date: December 18, 2017
- Venue: Lux Divina
- City: Brașov, Romania

Event chronology
RXF 28: VIP Special Edition	RXF 29: All Stars	RXF 30: Bucharest

RXF 29: All Stars (also known as RXF vs. Magnum FC) was a mixed martial arts event that took place on December 18, 2017, at the Lux Divina in Brașov, Romania.

=== Results ===
Main card
Weight class				Method	Round	Time	Notes
Super Heavyweight	(Romania) Alexandru Lungu	def.	(Serbia) Adnan Alić	TKO (punches)	1	1:12
Light Heavyweight	(Romania) Nicolae Negumereanu	def.	(Netherlands) Olutobi Ayodeji Kalejaiye	TKO (punches)	2	3:04
Lightweight	(Brazil) Diego Nunes	def.	(Romania) Corneliu Lascăr	Submission (guillotine choke)	3	4:46
Women's Flyweight	(Romania) Diana Belbiţă	def.	(Greece) Christina Netza	TKO (punches)	3	0:49
Welterweight	(Brazil) Jean Petrick	def.	(Romania) Florin Lambagiu	Decision (split)	3	5:00
Women's Strawweight	(Italy) Micol Di Segni	def.	(Romania) Alina Drimba	TKO (punches)	1	2:01
Middleweight	(Italy) Michele Verginelli	def.	(Romania) Alexandru Ianţoc	Submission (rear-naked choke)	1	3:45
Welterweight	(United States) Carlo Pedersoli Jr.	def.	(Romania) Mircea Dumitrescu	Submission (arm-triangle choke)	1	2:39
Bantamweight	(Romania) Bogdan Barbu	def.	(Greece) Adrianos Stokas	TKO (punches)	1	1:50
Light Heavyweight	(Italy) Fabio Russo	def.	(Romania) Izidor Bunea	Submission (guillotine choke)	1	2:04
Lightweight	(Russia) Ibragim Kantaev	def.	(Moldova) Valeriu Mircea	Decision (unanimous)	3	5:00
Featherweight	(Romania) Ciprian Mariș	def.	(Canada) Gabe Sagman	Decision (unanimous)	3	5:00
Lightweight	(Romania) Radu Dorobanț	def.	(Romania) Bogdan Ferariu	Submission (rear-naked choke)	3	3:04
Lightweight	(France) Islam Rechidov	def.	(Romania) Andrei Vasinca	Submission (armbar)	1	3:00

== See also ==
- 2017 in Romanian kickboxing
