= Saparbek Safarov =

Russian mixed martial artist (born 1986)

Saparbek Safarov Сапарбек Сафаров
- Born: Saparbek Dibirovich Safarov; October 14, 1986 (age 40); Makhachkala, Dagestan, Russia
- Nationality: Russian
- Height: 6 ft 1 in (185 cm)
- Weight: 205 lb (93 kg; 14 st 9 lb)
- Division: Heavyweight; Light Heavyweight; Middleweight (2020–present)
- Reach: 78 in (198 cm)
- Style: Sambo, Freestyle wrestling
- Fighting out of: Makhachkala, Dagestan, Russia
- Team: Legion Fight Team; K Dojo Warrior Tribe; Eagles MMA Dagestan
- Rank: Master of Sports in Freestyle Wrestling; Master of Sports in Combat Sambo
- Years active: 2010–present

Mixed martial arts record
- Total: 13
- Wins: 10
- By knockout: 7
- By submission: 2
- By decision: 1
- Losses: 3
- By knockout: 1
- By submission: 2

Other information
- Mixed martial arts record from Sherdog

Saparbek Dibirovich Safarov (Russian: Сапарбек Сафаров; born 14 October 1986) is a Russian mixed martial artist, who competes in the light heavyweight division. He competed for the Ultimate Fighting Championship.

== Mixed martial arts career ==
Safarov started his career with 8 straight victories that included 6 knockouts and 2 submissions. He was then called in for a short replacement fight against Gian Villante. Gian's original opponent, Patrick Cummins, pulled out of the fight with a staph infection. Safarov suffered the first loss of his career by knockout in a back and forth fight. Both participants were awarded Fight of the Night for their performance.

Safarov was next expected to fight Marcos Rogério de Lima at UFC Fight Night 115. However, Lima tested positive for banned anabolic steroids and the bout was cancelled.

Safarov faced Tyson Pedro on February 11, 2018 at UFC 221. He lost the fight via kimura submission in the first round.

Safarov was expected to face Alonzo Menifield on November 10, 2018 at UFC Fight Night 139. However, it was reported on October 21, 2018 that Safarov pulled out from the event due to undisclosed reasons and the bout was scrapped.

Safarov was scheduled to face Gökhan Saki on March 16, 2019 at UFC Fight Night 147. However, Saki pulled out of the fight in late February due to an undisclosed injury. Saki was replaced by Nicolae Negumereanu. Safarov won the fight via unanimous decision.

Safarov was expected to face promotional newcomer Da Un Jung on August 31, 2019 at UFC Fight Night 157. However, on August 5, 2019, Safarov was pulled from the bout for undisclosed reasons.

Safarov faced Rodolfo Vieira in a middleweight bout on March 7, 2020 at UFC 248. He lost the fight via an arm-triangle submission in the first round.

Safarov was scheduled to face Julian Marquez on August 29, 2020 at UFC Fight Night 175. However, the bout was moved to UFC Fight Night: Felder vs. dos Anjos on November 14 after Safarov faced travel restrictions related to the COVID-19 pandemic. In turn, Safarov pulled out due to weight cut issues a day before the event and the pairing was canceled once again.

On December 8, 2020, it was announced that the UFC had released him.

== Championships and accomplishments ==
=== Mixed martial arts ===
- Ultimate Fighting Championship
  - Fight of the Night (One time) vs. Gian Villante

== Mixed martial arts record ==
Professional record breakdown
| 13 matches | 10 wins | 3 losses |
| By knockout | 7 | 1 |
| By submission | 2 | 2 |
| By decision | 1 | 0 |

| Res. | Record | Opponent | Method | Event | Date | Round | Time | Location | Notes |
|---|---|---|---|---|---|---|---|---|---|
| Win | 10–3 | Ramdan Mohhamed | TKO (punches) | MFP 240 - Modern Fighting Pankration 240 | May 25, 2023 | 1 | 2:16 | Moscow, Russia | |
| Loss | 9–3 | Rodolfo Vieira | Submission (arm-triangle choke) | UFC 248 | March 7, 2020 | 1 | 2:58 | Las Vegas, Nevada, United States | Middleweight debut. |
| Win | 9–2 | Nicolae Negumereanu | Decision (unanimous) | UFC Fight Night: Till vs. Masvidal | March 16, 2019 | 3 | 5:00 | London, England | Safarov was deducted a point in round 1 for continuously grabbing the cage. |
| Loss | 8–2 | Tyson Pedro | Submission (kimura) | UFC 221 | February 11, 2018 | 1 | 3:54 | Perth, Australia | |
| Loss | 8–1 | Gian Villante | TKO (punches) | UFC Fight Night: Lewis vs. Abdurakhimov | December 9, 2016 | 2 | 2:54 | Albany, New York, United States | Fight of the Night. |
| Win | 8–0 | Rodney Wallace | TKO (corner stoppage) | WFCA 17 | April 9, 2016 | 2 | 5:00 | Grozny, Russia | |
| Win | 7–0 | Giga Kukhalashvili | Submission (triangle choke) | ProFC 54 | September 7, 2014 | 1 | 2:13 | Rostov-on-Don, Russia | |
| Win | 6–0 | Valdas Pocevicius | KO (punches) | Battle of Stars 1 | December 22, 2012 | 1 | 0:00 | Makhachkala, Russia | Light Heavyweight debut. |
| Win | 5–0 | Igor Sliusarchuk | TKO (punches) | World Ultimate Full Contact | December 24, 2011 | 1 | 2:54 | Makhachkala, Russia | |
| Win | 4–0 | Igor Litoshik | TKO (punches) | M-1 Global | June 4, 2011 | 1 | 3:00 | Kyiv, Ukraine | |
| Win | 3–0 | Adrian Mallebranche | TKO (punches) | M-1 Selection 2011 | April 1, 2011 | 1 | 0:04 | Makhachkala, Russia | |
| Win | 2–0 | Vasily Klepikov | Submission (rear-naked choke) | M-1 Selection 2010 | February 12, 2011 | 1 | 1:18 | Kyiv, Ukraine | |
| Win | 1–0 | Visampasha Mirzakhanov | TKO (punches) | Legion Fight 5 | November 20, 2010 | 1 | 0:49 | Krasnodar, Russia | |

== See also ==
- List of male mixed martial artists
