= Kyle Nelson (fighter) =

Canadian mixed martial artist (born 1991)

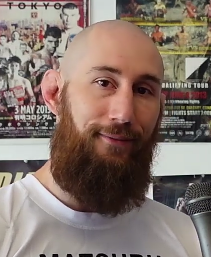
- Nelson in 2023
- Born: April 20, 1991 (age 35); Huntsville, Ontario, Canada
- Other names: The Monster
- Height: 5 ft 11 in (1.80 m)
- Weight: 145 lb (66 kg; 10 st 5 lb)
- Division: Featherweight (2012–present); Lightweight (2011–2012, 2015–2018, 2022, 2025)
- Reach: 71 in (180 cm)
- Fighting out of: Stoney Creek, Ontario, Canada
- Team: House of Champions MMA
- Rank: Black belt in Brazilian Jiu-Jitsu
- Years active: 2012–present

Mixed martial arts record
- Total: 26
- Wins: 17
- By knockout: 6
- By submission: 4
- By decision: 7
- Losses: 8
- By knockout: 5
- By submission: 1
- By decision: 2
- Draws: 1

Amateur record
- Total: 3
- Wins: 2
- By knockout: 1
- By submission: 1
- Losses: 1

Other information
- Mixed martial arts record from Sherdog

Kyle Nelson (born April 20, 1991) is a Canadian mixed martial artist who competes in the UFC Featherweight division. He previously competed for the RXF promotion, as well as Elite 1 MMA. Nelson is a former featherweight champion in Elite 1 MMA.

== Mixed martial arts career ==
=== Early career ===
Born and raised in Huntsville, Ontario, Canada, Nelson began competing in mixed martial arts in 2011. He held a 2–1 amateur record and then competed in local North American professional promotions. During this time he won the Elite 1 MMA Featherweight Championship, and also fought for the Lightweight Championship in TXC MMA. He then signed with the RXF in Romania, Europe, and after with the UFC in 2018.

=== Ultimate Fighting Championship ===
Nelson made his promotional debut on December 8, 2018, on short notice against Carlos Diego Ferreira, replacing Jesse Ronson at UFC 231. He lost the fight via TKO in the second round.

Returning to Featherweight Nelson next faced Matt Sayles on May 4, 2019, at UFC Fight Night 151. He lost the fight via submission via arm-triangle choke 3:16 into round 3.

Nelson fought next at UFC Fight Night 159 on September 21, 2019 against Marco Polo Reyes. He won the fight via TKO at 1:36 of round 1, earning him his first UFC victory.

Nelson was scheduled to face Sean Woodson in a catchweight bout of 150 pounds on June 27, 2020 at UFC on ESPN 12. However, Nelson was pulled form the event due to visa issue and he was replaced by Julian Erosa.

Nelson faced Billy Quarantillo on September 12, 2020 at UFC on ESPN 17. He lost the fight via knockout in the third round.

Nelson faced Jai Herbert on July 23, 2022 at UFC Fight Night 208. He lost the fight by unanimous decision.

Nelson faced Choi Doo-ho on February 4, 2023, at UFC Fight Night 218. The fight ended via majority draw.

Nelson faced Blake Bilder on June 10, 2023, at UFC 289. He won the bout via unanimous decision.

Nelson faced Fernando Padilla on September 16, 2023, at UFC Fight Night 227. He won the fight via unanimous decision.

Nelson faced Bill Algeo on March 30, 2024, at UFC on ESPN 54. He won the fight via technical knockout in round one.

Nelson was scheduled to face Calvin Kattar on September 7, 2024, at UFC Fight Night 242. However, Kattar withdrew from the bout and was replaced by Steve Garcia. At the weigh-ins, Nelson weighed in at 148.5 pounds, two and a half pounds over the featherweight non-title fight limit. The bout proceeded at catchweight and he was fined 20 percent of his purse, which went to Garcia. Nelson lost the fight by technical knockout via elbows and punches in the first round.

Moving up to lightweight, Nelson faced Matt Frevola on October 18, 2025, at UFC Fight Night 262. He won the fight via unanimous decision.

Nelson faced Terrance McKinney on March 28, 2026 at UFC Fight Night 271. He lost the fight via technical knockout 24 seconds into the first round.

Nelson faced promotional newcomer Cristian Pérez on October 17, 2026 at UFC Fight Night 291. He lost the fight by knockout in the first round.

== Championships and accomplishments ==
- Elite1 Mixed Martial Arts
  - Featherweight Championship

== Mixed martial arts record ==
Professional record breakdown
26 matches	17 wins	8 losses
By knockout	6	5
By submission	4	1
By decision	7	2
Draws	1	

Res.	Record	Opponent	Method	Event	Date	Round	Time	Location	Notes
Loss	17–8–1	Cristian Pérez	KO (punches)	UFC Fight Night: Buckley vs. Malott	October 17, 2026	1	0:27	Edmonton, Alberta, Canada	
Loss	17–7–1	Terrance McKinney	TKO (head kick and punches)	UFC Fight Night: Adesanya vs. Pyfer	March 28, 2026	1	0:24	Seattle, Washington, United States	
Win	17–6–1	Matt Frevola	Decision (unanimous)	UFC Fight Night: de Ridder vs. Allen	October 18, 2025	3	5:00	Vancouver, British Columbia, Canada	Return to Lightweight.
Loss	16–6–1	Steve Garcia	TKO (elbows and punches)	UFC Fight Night: Burns vs. Brady	September 7, 2024	1	3:59	Las Vegas, Nevada, United States	Catchweight (148.5 lb) bout; Nelson missed weight.
Win	16–5–1	Bill Algeo	TKO (punches)	UFC on ESPN: Blanchfield vs. Fiorot	March 30, 2024	1	4:00	Atlantic City, New Jersey, United States	
Win	15–5–1	Fernando Padilla	Decision (unanimous)	UFC Fight Night: Grasso vs. Shevchenko 2	September 16, 2023	3	5:00	Las Vegas, Nevada, United States	
Win	14–5–1	Blake Bilder	Decision (unanimous)	UFC 289	June 10, 2023	3	5:00	Vancouver, British Columbia, Canada	
Draw	13–5–1	Choi Doo-ho	Draw (majority)	UFC Fight Night: Lewis vs. Spivac	February 4, 2023	3	5:00	Las Vegas, Nevada, United States	Choi was deducted 1 point in round 3 due to a headbutt.
Loss	13–5	Jai Herbert	Decision (unanimous)	UFC Fight Night: Blaydes vs. Aspinall	July 23, 2022	3	5:00	London, England	Lightweight bout.
Loss	13–4	Billy Quarantillo	KO (punch)	UFC Fight Night: Waterson vs. Hill	September 12, 2020	3	0:07	Las Vegas, Nevada, United States	
Win	13–3	Polo Reyes	TKO (punches)	UFC Fight Night: Rodríguez vs. Stephens	September 21, 2019	1	1:36	Mexico City, Mexico	
Loss	12–3	Matt Sayles	Submission (arm-triangle choke)	UFC Fight Night: Iaquinta vs. Cowboy	May 4, 2019	3	3:16	Ottawa, Ontario, Canada	Return to Featherweight.
Loss	12–2	Carlos Diego Ferreira	TKO (punches)	UFC 231	December 8, 2018	2	1:23	Toronto, Ontario, Canada	
Win	12–1	Morteza Rezaei	TKO (punches)	Real Xtreme Fighting 32	November 19, 2018	1	4:57	Brașov, Romania	Return to Lightweight.
Win	11–1	Khama Worthy	KO (punches)	BTC 1	May 27, 2017	1	1:03	Toronto, Ontario, Canada	
Win	10–1	Gabriel Mănucă	Submission (rear-naked choke)	Real Xtreme Fighting 26	April 25, 2017	1	3:50	Brașov, Romania	Lightweight bout.
Win	9–1	Jonathan Brookins	Decision (split)	Z Promotions: Fight Night 2	October 28, 2016	3	5:00	Medicine Hat, Alberta, Canada	
Win	8–1	Zoltán Turi	Submission (rear-naked choke)	Real Xtreme Fighting 23	June 6, 2016	1	1:23	Bucharest, Romania	
Win	7–1	Justin Bourgeois	TKO (punches)	Elite 1 MMA: Meltdown	April 23, 2016	1	2:01	Moncton, New Brunswick, Canada	Won the vacant Elite1 MMA Featherweight Championship.
Loss	6–1	Adrian Hadribeaj	Decision (unanimous)	Triple X Cagefighting: Legends 6	September 12, 2015	5	5:00	Novi, Michigan, United States	For the TXC Lightweight Championship.
Win	6–0	Ainsley Robinson	Technical Submission (guillotine choke)	Substance Cage Combat 2	May 30, 2014	1	0:42	Toronto, Ontario, Canada	
Win	5–0	Alex Halkias	Decision (unanimous)	Provincial FC 2	March 8, 2014	3	5:00	London, Ontario, Canada	
Win	4–0	Neelan Hordatt	Decision (split)	Substance Cage Combat 1	June 29, 2013	3	5:00	Toronto, Ontario, Canada	
Win	3–0	Maxime Dubois	TKO (punches)	Ultimate Generation Combat 32	May 10, 2013	2	1:36	Montreal, Quebec, Canada	
Win	2–0	Jo Petahtegoose	Submission (armbar)	Score Fighting Series 6	September 19, 2012	1	2:54	Sarnia, Ontario, Canada	Featherweight debut.
Win	1–0	Michael Dufort	Decision (unanimous)	Ringside MMA 13	March 17, 2012	3	5:00	Montreal, Quebec, Canada	Lightweight debut. Fight of the Night.

== See also ==
- List of current UFC fighters
- List of Canadian UFC fighters
- List of male mixed martial artists
