= Diana Belbiță =

Romanian mixed martial arts fighter

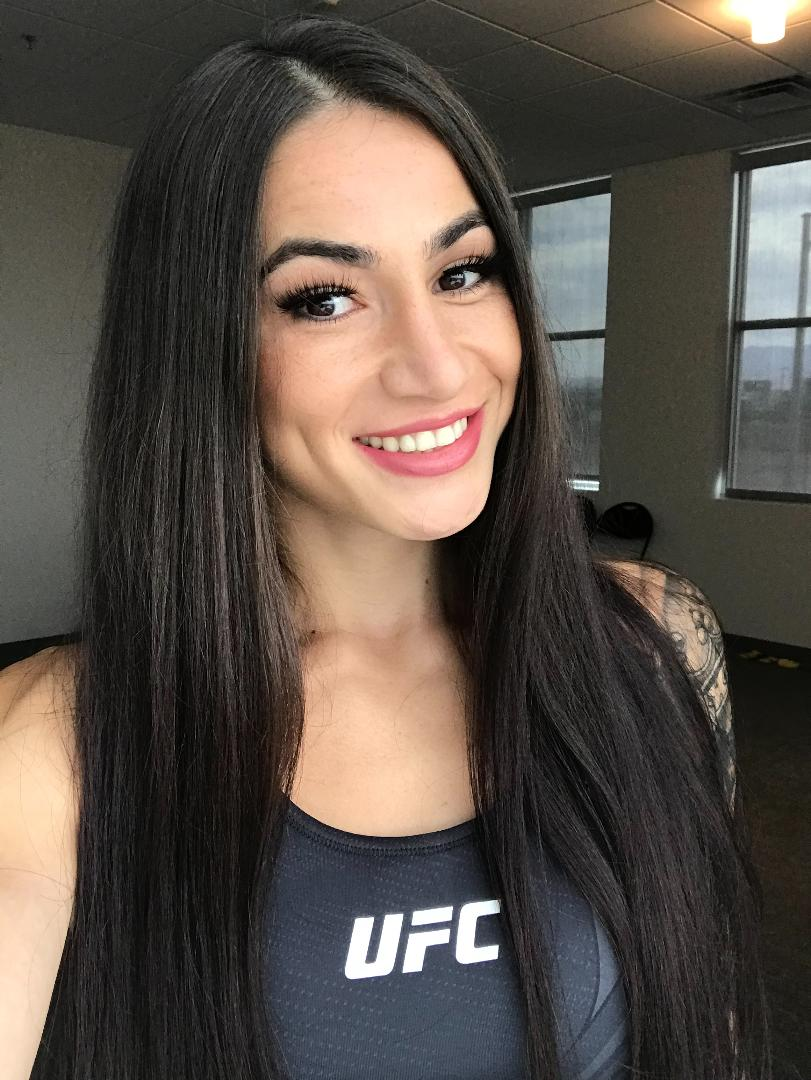
- Born: Diana Irena Belbiță; June 26, 1996 (age 30); Drobeta-Turnu Severin, Romania
- Other names: Warrior Princess
- Height: 5 ft 7 in (1.70 m)
- Weight: 115 lb (52 kg; 8 st 3 lb)
- Division: Strawweight; Flyweight
- Reach: 68 in (173 cm)
- Style: Kickboxing, Kempo
- Fighting out of: Stoney Creek, Ontario, Canada
- Team: House of Champions MMA
- Trainer: Kru Alin Halmagean, Adrian Wooley
- Years active: 2014–2025

Mixed martial arts record
- Total: 25
- Wins: 15
- By knockout: 6
- By submission: 4
- By decision: 5
- Losses: 10
- By submission: 6
- By decision: 4

Other information
- Mixed martial arts record from Sherdog

Diana Irena Belbiță (born June 26, 1996) is a Romanian former mixed martial artist, and kickboxing, judo and kempo practitioner. She competed in the women's Strawweight division of the Ultimate Fighting Championship. Belbiță is a former world and European kempo champion, as well RXF and KSW championships challenger.

== Background ==
Belbiță entered the world of contact sports at the age of 12, when she started judo, and later went to kickboxing and karate. In 2014, she became a professional fighter and eventually managed to win the titles of European and World champion in kempo. She initially struggled with financial difficulties in her career.

In 2019, Belbiță appeared on Ferma, a show based on a group of celebrities living together twenty-four hours a day on a farm, with no privacy for three months and isolated from the outside world, which gave her a boost in popularity.

== Mixed martial arts career ==
=== Early career ===
Diana Belbiță, starting her professional career in 2014, compiled a 13–4 record on the European MMA scene, with three of the losses coming to UFC/Bellator MMA veterans Cristina Stanciu, Ariane Lipski via first round armbar for the inaugural KSW Women's Flyweight Championship at KSW 39: Colosseum, and Iony Razafiarison.

=== Ultimate Fighting Championship ===
Belbiță made her UFC debut against Molly McCann on October 18, 2019 at UFC on ESPN: Reyes vs. Weidman. She lost the fight via unanimous decision.

Belbiță faced Liana Jojua at UFC on ESPN: Kattar vs. Ige on July 16, 2020. She lost the fight via armbar in first round.

Belbiță faced Hannah Goldy at UFC on ESPN: Sandhagen vs. Dillashaw on July 24, 2021. She won the fight via unanimous decision.

Belbiță faced Gloria de Paula on February 19, 2022 at UFC Fight Night: Walker vs. Hill. She lost the fight via unanimous decision.

Belbiță was scheduled to face Loma Lookboonmee on September 17, 2022 at UFC Fight Night 210. However, Belbiță withdrew due to undisclosed reasons and was replaced by Denise Gomes.

Belbiță faced Maria Oliveira on June 10, 2023, at UFC 289. She won the bout via unanimous decision.

Belbiță faced Karolina Kowalkiewicz at UFC Fight Night 229 on October 7, 2023. She lost the fight via unanimous decision.

Belbiță faced Molly McCann in a rematch on February 3, 2024, at UFC Fight Night 235. She lost the fight via an armbar submission in round one.

Belbiță faced Dione Barbosa in a flyweight bout on April 5, 2025 at UFC on ESPN 65. She lost the fight via an arm-triangle submission choke in the first round.

On April 8, 2025, Belbiță announced her retirement from mixed martial arts competition.

== Championships and accomplishments ==
=== Kempo ===
- International Kempo Federation
  - 2018 IKF World Kempo Championship Gold Medalist
  - 2017 IKF Kempo European Championships -60 kg/132 lb Full-Kempo Gold Medalist
- United World Sport Kempo Federation
  - 2017 UWSKF European Open Championship Gold Medalist

=== Kickboxing ===
- World Association of Kickboxing Organizations
  - 2012 WAKO Kickboxing World Cup Gold Medalist

=== Karate ===
- Romanian Federation of Contact Martial Arts
  - 2013 FRAMC Romania Budokai National Championship Sei-Budokai Gold Medalist

== Mixed martial arts record ==
Professional record breakdown
25 matches	15 wins	10 losses
By knockout	6	0
By submission	4	6
By decision	5	4

Res.	Record	Opponent	Method	Event	Date	Round	Time	Location	Notes
Loss	15–10	Dione Barbosa	Submission (arm-triangle choke)	UFC on ESPN: Emmett vs. Murphy	April 5, 2025	1	4:13	Las Vegas, Nevada, United States	Return to Flyweight.
Loss	15–9	Molly McCann	Submission (armbar)	UFC Fight Night: Dolidze vs. Imavov	February 3, 2024	1	4:59	Las Vegas, Nevada, United States	
Loss	15–8	Karolina Kowalkiewicz	Decision (unanimous)	UFC Fight Night: Dawson vs. Green	October 7, 2023	3	5:00	Las Vegas, Nevada, United States	
Win	15–7	Maria Oliveira	Decision (unanimous)	UFC 289	June 10, 2023	3	5:00	Vancouver, British Columbia, Canada	
Loss	14–7	Gloria de Paula	Decision (unanimous)	UFC Fight Night: Walker vs. Hill	February 19, 2022	3	5:00	Las Vegas, Nevada, United States	
Win	14–6	Hannah Goldy	Decision (unanimous)	UFC on ESPN: Sandhagen vs. Dillashaw	July 24, 2021	3	5:00	Las Vegas, Nevada, United States	Strawweight debut.
Loss	13–6	Liana Jojua	Submission (armbar)	UFC on ESPN: Kattar vs. Ige	July 16, 2020	1	2:47	Abu Dhabi, United Arab Emirates	
Loss	13–5	Molly McCann	Decision (unanimous)	UFC on ESPN: Reyes vs. Weidman	October 18, 2019	3	5:00	Boston, Massachusetts, United States	Belbiță was deducted one point in round 2 due to grabbing the cage.
Win	13–4	Ana Maria Pal	Submission (armbar)	Real Xtreme Fighting 34	May 13, 2019	2	3:26	Brașov, Romania	
Win	12–4	Milena Bojiç	TKO (punches)	Real Xtreme Fighting 33	December 10, 2018	1	0:17	Bucharest, Romania	
Win	11–4	Ana Maria Pal	Submission (armbar)	Real Xtreme Fighting 30	August 20, 2018	2	1:35	Bucharest, Romania	
Win	10–4	Cristina Netza	TKO (punches)	Real Xtreme Fighting 29	December 18, 2017	3	0:49	Brașov, Romania	
Loss	9–4	Iony Razafiarison	Submission (guillotine choke)	Superior FC 18	September 16, 2017	2	1:21	Ludwigshafen, Germany	For the Superior FC Flyweight Championship.
Win	9–3	Morgane Manfredi	Decision (majority)	Real Xtreme Fighting 27	July 29, 2017	3	5:00	Piatra Neamț, Romania	
Loss	8–3	Ariane Lipski	Submission (armbar)	KSW 39	May 27, 2017	1	4:52	Warsaw, Poland	For the inaugural KSW Women's Flyweight Championship.
Win	8–2	Katarzyna Lubońska	Decision (unanimous)	KSW 36	October 1, 2016	3	5:00	Zielona Góra, Poland	Return to Flyweight.
Win	7–2	Virág Furó	TKO (elbows)	Real Xtreme Fighting 23	June 6, 2016	1	2:08	Bucharest, Romania	
Win	6–2	Paulina Borkowska	TKO (head kick and punches)	Real Xtreme Fighting 22	March 21, 2016	1	4:00	Bucharest, Romania	
Loss	5–2	Eeva Siiskonen	Decision (split)	Lappeenranta Fight Night 14	November 28, 2015	3	5:00	Lappeenranta, Finland	
Loss	5–1	Cristina Stanciu	Submission (armbar)	Real Xtreme Fighting 18	June 15, 2015	1	2:41	Cluj-Napoca, Romania	For RXF Bantamweight Championship.
Win	5–0	Renáta Cseh-Lantos	Decision (unanimous)	Real Xtreme Fighting 17	March 16, 2015	3	5:00	Craiova, Romania	Return to Bantamweight.
Win	4–0	Roxana Crișan	TKO (punches)	Ultimate Fighting Tournament 3	November 7, 2014	1	N/A	Cluj-Napoca, Romania	Flyweight debut.
Win	3–0	Alice Ardelean	Submission (armbar)	Real Xtreme Fighting 14	November 3, 2014	2	3:05	Sibiu, Romania	
Win	2–0	Roxana Dinescu	Submission (armbar)	Real Xtreme Fighting 12	August 4, 2014	2	4:12	Mamaia, Romania	
Win	1–0	Roxana Crișan	TKO (punches)	Real Xtreme Fighting 10	April 5, 2014	1	1:22	Drobeta-Turnu Severin, Romania	Bantamweight debut.

== See also ==
- List of female mixed martial artists
