= Micol Di Segni =

Italian mixed martial artist

- Born: 29 December 1987 (age 38); Rome, Italy
- Height: 5 ft 3 in (160 cm)
- Weight: 115 lb (52 kg; 8 st 3 lb)
- Division: Strawweight
- Fighting out of: Rome, Italy
- Years active: 2014–present

Mixed martial arts record
- Total: 15
- Wins: 10
- By knockout: 4
- By submission: 2
- By decision: 4
- Losses: 5
- By knockout: 1
- By decision: 4

Other information
- Mixed martial arts record from Sherdog

Micol Di Segni (born 29 December 1987) is an Italian professional mixed martial artist, Power Slap striker and alternative model.

She has been a pin-up model for the punk rock website SuicideGirls since 2007, featured in more than 20 photoshoots, 2 hard cover books ("Hard Girls, Soft Light" and "Geekology"), magazines and DVD ("UK Holiday"). Also known as Eden Von Hell, she has been featured in many Italian TV shows, movies, radio shows (like La Zanzara, the Late Show on Rai Radio 2 and Non è un lavoro per donne on Radio Rock), and on the pages of international magazines like Men's Health, GQ, Inked and Tattoo Life.

== Mixed martial arts career ==
=== Amateur career ===
Micol made her amateur MMA debut in 2014 gaining the flyweight spot in the Italian National Team. She competed at the International Mixed Martial Arts Federation 2014 World Championship in Las Vegas, conquering a bronze medal after three hard fought rounds in the semifinals against the Brazilian Amanda Ribas. The next year she became the Flyweight World Champion defeating the Swedish Anja Saxmark in the finals of the IMMAF 2015 World Championships.

=== Professional career ===
Signed with the South African promotion Extreme Fighting Championship (EFC) to make her professional debut in October 2015, she faced Danella Eliasov to gain a unanimous decision win. After a second EFC bout at flyweight against Shana Power in June 2016, she started to divide her training camps between Rome and Albuquerque. At Jackson Wink she had the chance to confront and master her skills with some of the best fighters in the world. After dropping down to strawweight, she went on a five-fight winning streak, mostly by finishing her opponents before the bell ring, taking her to become the first Italian female to fight in European and international events like Cage Warriors, RXF, Brave Combat Federation and Dana White's Contender Series. At the beginning of 2020 the Spanish promotion AFL announced the first female only MMA event in Europe, with Micol Di Segni as the first contender for the strawweight title.

The event got postponed to October 2020, with the title fight DiSegni vs Kerouche as the main event. Micol Di Segni conquered the inaugural strawweight title defeating her opponent with ground and pound strikes during the third round of the main event of the "AFL Valkyries - DiSegni vs Kerouche" card.

After winning a year later at Venator FC 8 via TKO stoppage in the second round against Adriana Fusini on October 30, 2021, DiSegni appeared at Ares FC 4 on March 10, 2022 against Eizabeth Rodrigues. She lost the bout via split decision.

DiSegni appeared at Cage Warriors 144 on October 7, 2022 against Bryony Tyrell. She won the bout via unanimous decision.

DiSegni faced Amanda Torres on July 29, 2023 at Cage Warriors 158, losing the bout via split decision.

== Power Slap career ==
At the beginning of 2025 Micol signed with Power Slap winning her debut bout against Chelsea Dodson in Las Vegas during PowerSlap 12

== Championships and accomplishments ==
=== IMMAF ===
- Flyweight Bronze Medalist 2014
- Flyweight World Champion 2015

=== AFL ===
- First Strawweight Champion

== Mixed martial arts record ==
Professional record breakdown
15 matches	10 wins	5 losses
By knockout	4	1
By submission	2	0
By decision	4	4

Res.	Record	Opponent	Method	Event	Date	Round	Time	Location	Notes
Loss	10–5	Amanda Torres	Decision (split)	Cage Warriors 158	July 29, 2023	3	5:00	Rome, Italy	
Win	10–4	Bryony Tyrell	Decision (unanimous)	Cage Warriors 144	October 7, 2022	3	5:00	Rome, Italy	
Loss	9–4	Elizabeth Rodrigues	Decision (split)	Ares FC 4	March 10, 2022	3	5:00	Paris, France	
Win	9–3	Adriana Fusini	TKO (punches)	Venator FC 8	October 30, 2021	2	4:07	Montecatini Terme, Italy	
Win	8–3	Audrey Kerouche	TKO (punches)	AFL: Valkyries	October 10, 2020	3	3:22	Barcelona, Spain	Won the AFL Strawweight Championship.
Loss	7–3	Mallory Martin	Decision (unanimous)	Dana White's Contender Series 25	August 20, 2019	3	5:00	Las Vegas, Nevada, United States	
Win	7–2	Nikolina Vokic	Submission (rear naked choke)	Day in the Cage 4	April 13, 2019	1	1:10	Monte Urano, Italy	
Loss	6–2	Maria Ribeiro	TKO (punches)	Brave CF 20	December 22, 2018	1	1:09	Hyderabad, India	
Win	6–1	Cory McKenna	Decision (split)	Cage Warriors 97	September 29, 2018	3	5:00	Cardiff, Wales, United Kingdom	
Win	5–1	Elena Belaya	Submission (armbar)	Fight Club Championship	June 9, 2018	1	1:40	Sassari, Italy	
Win	4–1	Samin Kamal Beik	TKO (punches)	Kombat League: Magnum FC 4	March 3, 2018	2	2:37	Verona, Italy	
Win	3–1	Alina Drimba	TKO (punches)	RXF 29: All Stars	December 18, 2017	1	2:01	Brașov, Romania	
Win	2–1	Anastasia Gornostaeva	Decision (unanimous)	Kombat League: Magnum 2	July 22, 2017	3	5:00	Roma, Italy	Strawweight debut.
Loss	1–1	Shana Power	Decision (unanimous)	EFC Worldwide 50	June 17, 2016	3	5:00	Sun City, South Africa	
Win	1–0	Danella Eliasov	Decision (unanimous)	EFC Worldwide 44	October 3, 2015	3	5:00	Johannesburg, South Africa	Flyweight debut.
