= Berăria H =

Beer hall in Romania

Coordinates: 44.4767°N 26.0760°E

Berăria H is a beer hall in Bucharest, Romania, that functions in the former Pavilionul H building (a communist building that served as Romania's Heavy Industry Pavilion).

== History ==
The building was constructed between 1949 and 1953 according to the project designed by architects Gustav Gusti, Harry Stern, and Ascanio Damian, along with engineer E. Ţiţariu. It served as an exhibition space showcasing the achievements of the Socialist Heavy Industry.

In the 1990s, it was remodeled into a large retail space, being considered the first mall in Bucharest.

In 2014, after a reconstruction that lasted approximately 2 years, the space changed its name to Beraria H and became the largest beer hall in Romania.

== Today ==
Today Berăria H serves multiple functions: restaurant, concert hall, beer garden. With a capacity of over 3000 seats, it hosts more than 300 events annually, including concerts, exhibitions, and festivals
