= Alexandru Lungu (fighter) =

Romanian martial artist

- Born: 3 September 1974 (age 52); Paleu, Bihor County, Romania
- Other names: Sandu Lungu; Muntele Bihorului (The Bihor Mountain)
- Nationality: Romanian
- Height: 6 ft 0 in (182 cm)
- Weight: 352 lb (160 kg; 25 st 2 lb)
- Division: Super Heavyweight (265+ lb)
- Reach: 74 in (188 cm)
- Style: Judo Kickboxing
- Fighting out of: Oradea, Romania; Bucharest, Romania
- Team: Centru de Arte Marțiale Mixte; Golden Glory Romania
- Trainer: Ioan Brânză; Horia Rădulescu
- Rank: 6th Dan Black Belt in Judo
- Years active: 2005-present (MMA)

Kickboxing record
- Total: 18
- Wins: 16
- By knockout: 11
- Losses: 2
- By knockout: 1
- Draws: 0

Mixed martial arts record
- Total: 26
- Wins: 21
- By knockout: 13
- By submission: 8
- Losses: 5
- By knockout: 5
- By submission: 0
- Draws: 0

Other information
- Spouse: Clara Lungu
- Mixed martial arts record from Sherdog
- Judo career
- Weight class: +95 kg, Open

Judo achievements and titles
- Olympic Games: 9th (1996)
- World Champ.: 7th (2001)
- European Champ.: (bronze) (1999)
Medal record
Men's judo
Representing Romania
European Championships
Bronze medal – third place	1999 Bratislava	Open
World Juniors Championships
Gold medal – first place	1994 Cairo	+95 kg
European Junior Championships
Gold medal – first place	1994 Lisbon	+95 kg
Summer Universiade
Gold medal – first place	1999 Palma de Mallorca	Open

Profile at external judo databases
- IJF: 14154
- JudoInside.com: 551
- Updated on 31 October 2024
- Last updated on: 6 December 2022

Alexandru Lungu (born 3 September 1974) is a Romanian professional mixed martial artist, kickboxer and judoka. Lungu has most recently competed in the Super Heavyweight division of MMA. A professional competitor since 2005, Lungu has formerly competed for the PRIDE Fighting Championships, Cage Rage, and K-1, for both MMA and professional kickboxing.

== Judo career ==
A successful judoka, Lungu won several judo tournaments across Europe, including the Romanian Cup in 2004 and the International Tournament Monaco in 2005. Lungu competed in judo from 1991 until 2005.

He competed for Romania at the 1996 Summer Olympics.

== Mixed martial arts career ==
=== PRIDE Fighting Championships ===
Lungu made his professional MMA debut on 23 October 2005 at PRIDE 30 against James Thompson, in a Super Heavyweight bout, Lungu weighed in at 368 lbs. and knocked Thompson down in the early seconds of round one, but seemed to fatigue upon standing up and lost via TKO at 2:13 of the first round.

=== Cage Rage ===
Lungu picked up a win in his next fight a year later on 30 September 2006 at Cage Rage 18 against Mark Buchanan via submission (kimura) in the first round.

=== Independent promotions ===
Lungu returned to Romania to continue competing and has compiled a record of 9-2 since PRIDE and Cage Rage.

Lungu defeated Mighty Mo via knockout in the first round on 15 December 2014 in an Open Weight bout.

Lungu is next scheduled to face Jeff Monson on 15 June 2015 at RXF 18.

=== Kickboxing career ===
Lungu made his professional kickboxing debut for SUPERKOMBAT on 15 October 2011, against Bob Sapp. Lungu won via knockout in the first round and has since compiled a professional kickboxing record of 4-1 for the promotion, most recently picking up a win over Mike Bourke on 21 December 2013 via first round knockout.

== Championships and accomplishments ==
=== Kickboxing ===
- Superkombat Fighting Championship
  - 2011 Special Fight of the Year (vs. Bob Sapp)

== Kickboxing record ==
Kickboxing record
15 wins (11 KOs), 2 losses, 0 draws
Date	Result	Opponent	Event	Location	Method	Round	Time	Record	Notes
14 Dec 2021	Win	(Netherlands) Vincent Liebregts	Colosseum Tournament 29	Arad, Romania	TKO (three knockdowns)	2	2:55	15–2	
20 Sep 2021	Win	(Serbia) Adnan Alić	Colosseum Tournament 27	Oradea, Romania	Decision (unanimous)	3	3:00	14–2	
31 May 2021	Win	(Italy) Franco De Martiis	Colosseum Tournament 25	Cluj-Napoca, Romania	Decision (unanimous)	3	3:00	13–2	
25 Sep 2020	Win	(Hungary) Tamás Hajdu	Colosseum Tournament 19	Debrecen, Hungary	TKO (referee stoppage)	1	1:43	12–2	
22 Sep 2019	Win	(Netherlands) Satisch Jhamai	Colosseum Tournament 15	Oradea, Romania	KO (punches flurry)	2	2:25	11–2	
9 May 2019	Win	(Hungary) Zoltán Enyedi	Colosseum Tournament 12	Arad, Romania	KO (left hook)	2	0:20	10–2	
10 Dec 2018	Win	(Spain) Fredi Gonzales	KO Masters 1	Bucharest, Romania	TKO (referee stoppage)	1	1:30	9–2	
29 Jun 2017	Loss	(Morocco) Yassine Boughanem	Best of Siam 11	Paris, France	KO (strikes)	1		8-2	
21 December 2013	Win	(United States) Mike Bourke	SUPERKOMBAT World Grand Prix 2013 Final	Galați, Romania	KO (strikes)	1	1:25	8-1	
6 April 2013	Loss	(England) Jason Dutton	SUPERKOMBAT World Grand Prix I 2013	Oradea, Romania	DQ (strikes on a downed opponent)	1	3:00	7-1	
20 October 2012	Win	(United States) Deutsch Pu'u	SUPERKOMBAT World Grand Prix IV 2012	Arad, Romania	KO (punch)	2	1:42	7-0	
12 May 2012	Win	(Poland) Wiesław Kwaśniewski	SUPERKOMBAT World Grand Prix II 2012	Cluj Napoca, Romania	Decision (split)	3	3:00	6-0	
17 November 2011	Win	(United States) Neil Cooke	SUPERKOMBAT Fight Club	Oradea, Romania	KO (punches)	1	0:50	5-0	
15 October 2011	Win	(United States) Bob Sapp	SUPERKOMBAT World Grand Prix IV 2011	Piatra Neamț, Romania	KO (left hook)	1	1:11	4-0	
Legend: Win Loss Draw/No contest

== Mixed martial arts record ==
Professional record breakdown
26 matches	21 wins	5 losses
By knockout	13	5
By submission	8	0
By decision	0	0

Res.	Record	Opponent	Method	Event	Date	Round	Time	Location	Notes
Win	21–5	Dejan Bubic	Submission (smother choke)	Heroes Fight League 7	30 June 2023	1	4:58	Râmnicu Vâlcea, Romania	
Win	20–5	Gyula Szuhanyi	Submission (kimura)	Heroes Fight League 6 & ARMMADA 3: Fight In The Balkans	16 December 2022	1	2:16	Bucharest, Romania	
Win	19–5	Fredy Cubano	TKO (punches)	Fight Zone 9	4 December 2022	1	0:34	Deva, Romania	
Win	18–5	Florin Dănilă	TKO (leg injury)	Heroes Fight League 5	16 September 2022	1	1:26	Mioveni, Romania	
Win	17–5	Peter Balaž	Submission (smother)	RXF 31	1 October 2018	1	3:05	Cluj-Napoca, Romania	
Loss	16–5	Chris Barnett	KO (punches)	Road FC 047	12 May 2018	1	2:34	Beijing, China	Road FC 2018 Openweight Grand Prix
Win	16–4	Adnan Alić	TKO (punches)	RXF 29: All Stars	18 December 2017	1	1:12	Brasov, Romania	
Win	15–4	Martin Chuděj	TKO (punches)	RXF 27	29 July 2017	2	1:36	Piatra Neamț, Romania	
Win	14–4	John Painter	TKO (punches)	RXF 25: All Stars	19 December 2016	1	0:26	Ploiești, Romania	
Win	13–4	Papis Konez	TKO (punches)	RXF 24	10 October 2016	1	2:05	Brasov, Romania	
Loss	12–4	Michał Wlazło	TKO (knees and punches)	RXF 21: All Stars	14 December 2015	2	3:11	Bucharest, Romania	
Win	12–3	Mahmoud Hassan	Submission (Von Flue choke)	RXF 19	31 August 2015	1	2:43	Galati, Romania	
Win	11–3	Andrzej Kulik	TKO (punches)	RXF 18: Stanciu vs. Belbiță	15 June 2015	1	1:59	Cluj-Napoca, Romania	
Win	10–3	Mighty Mo	KO (punch)	RXF 15: All Stars	15 December 2014	1	4:05	Bucharest, Romania	
Loss	9–3	Tomasz Czerwinski	TKO (punches)	RXF 12	4 August 2014	1	4:25	Mamaia, Romania	
Win	9-2	Steven Banks	TKO (strikes)	Local Kombat	7 December 2012	1	N/A	Onesti, Romania	
Win	8–2	Chris Mahle	Submission (arm-triangle choke)	Gala MMA: Romania-Germany	29 October 2011	1	1:06	Cluj Napoca, Romania	
Win	7–2	Albert Sarkozi	Submission (punches)	Local Kombat Sibiu	19 November 2010	1	0:25	Sibiu, Romania	
Win	6–2	Jimmy Ambriz	TKO (doctor stoppage)	K-1 World Grand Prix 2010 in Bucharest – Europe GP	21 May 2010	2	N/A	Bucharest, Romania	
Loss	5–2	Rastislav Talarovic	TKO (punches)	K-1 ColliZion 2009 Final	12 December 2009	2	0:46	Prague, Czech Republic	
Win	5–1	Jesse Smith, Jr.	Submission (smother choke)	K-1 ColliZion 2009 Final Elimination	24 October 2009	1	0:51	Arad, Romania	
Win	4–1	Ruben Villareal	Submission (smother choke)	Local Kombat 33	12 April 2009	1	1:45	Oradea, Romania	
Win	3–1	Mark Bentley	KO (punches)	Strike MMA 3	31 October 2008	1	0:06	Cluj-Napoca, Romania	
Win	2–1	Tom Erikson	KO (punches)	Strike MMA 2	1 August 2008	1	1:21	Mamaia, Romania	
Win	1–1	Mark Buchanan	Submission (kimura)	Cage Rage 18	30 September 2006	1	1:55	London, England	
Loss	0–1	James Thompson	TKO (punches)	PRIDE 30	23 October 2005	1	2:13	Saitama, Japan	

== Achievements ==
Year	Tournament	Place	Weight class
2002	European Judo Championships	7th	Open class
2001	World Judo Championships	7th	Open class
1999	European Judo Championships	3rd	Open class
1999	Universiade	1st	Open class
1998	European Judo Championships	7th	Heavyweight (+100 kg)
1994	Youth Judo World Championships	1st	

Lungu was also a multiple judo champion and gold medalist of Romania.

== Personal life ==
In 2015, his second wife gave birth to twins.

== See also ==
- List of judoka
- List of male mixed martial artists
- List of K-1 events
- List of male kickboxers
