= Sala Transilvania =

Indoor arena in Romania

Coordinates: 45°46′58″N 24°08′44″E

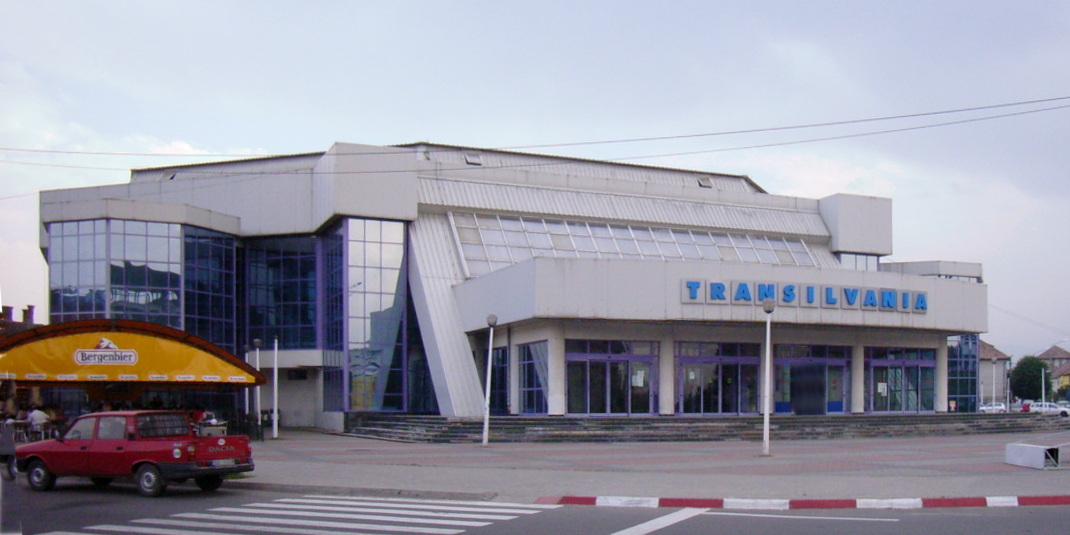
- Interactive map of Sala Transilvania
- Location: Sibiu, Romania
- Owner: Sibiu County Council
- Capacity: 1,850 (seats)

Construction
- Opened: 1998

Tenants
- CSU Sibiu; Volei Alba Blaj; Măgura Cisnădie

Website
- http://www.salatransilvania.ro/

Sala Transilvania is an indoor arena in Sibiu, Romania.
