= Sport Extra =

Romanian sports television channel

- Country: Romania
- Headquarters: Bucharest

Ownership
- Owner: DigitalBroadcast
- Sister channels: Mooz Ro; Mooz Dance; Mooz Hits

History
- Launched: 2 March 2020; 6 years ago

Links
- Website: live.sportextra.ro

Sport Extra is a Romanian sports television, launched on 2 March 2020.

It primarily focuses on combat sports and motorsport, but also broadcasts football, basketball, water polo, cycling, and other sports. The channel's main sports broadcasts include kickboxing competitions such as Colosseum Tournament, Dynamite Fighting Show, GLORY, KO Masters, ONE Championship, WGP, and WLF; mixed martial arts (MMA) promotions including Bellator MMA, Lux Fight League, RXF, UAE Warriors, and UCMMA; as well as professional wrestling through AEW Dynamite. Sport Extra also broadcasts motorsport competitions, including the IndyCar Series, NASCAR, and DTM.

== Sport competitions ==
=== Aquatics ===
- LEN Champions League

=== Basketball ===
- Copa del Rey de Baloncesto
- Liga ACB
- LNB Pro A
- Supercopa de España de Baloncesto

=== Cycling ===
- Giro Donne
- Tour of Romania

=== Darts ===
- Campionatul Național de Darts
- WDF World Cup

=== Football ===
- Eredivisie
- Saudi Professional League
- Saudi Super Cup
- Serie B

=== Ice hockey ===
- National League

=== Martial Arts ===
- One Championship (ONE)
- Professional Fighters League (PFL)
- Boxxer
- Dynamite Fighting Show (DFS)
- KO Masters
- Ultimate Fighting Tournament (UFT)
- Senshi
- Queensberry

=== Motor sport ===
- AMC Racing
- Andros Trophy
- CNSR
- CNVC
- DTM
- Drone Champions League
- European Truck Racing Championship
- Formula Renault Eurocup
- Goodwood Festival of Speed
- GT Intercontinental Challenge
- GT World Challenge America
- GT World Challenge Europe
- GT4 European Series
- GT-R Sprint Series
- IndyCar Series
- Le Mans European Series
- Le Mans Cup
- Motocross World Championship
- NASCAR
- New Zealand Jetsprint Championship
- Romanian Rally Championship
- WeatherTech SportsCar Championship

=== Tennis ===
- United Cup
- World TeamTennis
