= Telekom TV =

- Type: Private
- Industry: Telecommunication
- Founded: 2006
- Headquarters: Bucharest, Romania
- Products: Direct broadcast satellite
- Parent: Telekom Romania
- Website: www.telekom.ro

Telekom TV (previously Dolce) is a satellite television platform of Telekom Romania, a Romanian telephony and Internet provider. It operates on the satellite: 39°E, Hellas Sat 3. As of 2008, Dolce had more than 500.000 customers.

== Own channels ==
Telekom Sport (named Dolce Sport until 12 September 2017) is a sports television that was launched on 28 July 2010, available only in the Telekom and the NextGen networks. It is also broadcast in high definition and has five secondary channels from Telekom Sport 2 to 6.

It has been broadcasting, among other competitions, matches from Liga I, Cupa României, Liga II, UEFA Champions League (continuously from 2010), UEFA Europa League Premier League, La Liga, Bundesliga, DFB-Pokal, Turkish Super Cup (in year 2015), Women's and Men's EHF Champions League, WTA Tour Championships (until 2016), Formula One (since the 2014 season), ATP World Tour Masters 1000, NBA (continuously since 2010) NFL, NHL, Italian Volleyball League

In 2016, Dolce Sport was the official broadcaster in Romania for the European Championship.
