= Sala Sporturilor Dumitru Popescu Colibași =

Indoor arena located in Brașov, Romania

Coordinates: 45°39′36″N 25°37′4″E

Dumitru Popescu Colibași Sports Hall
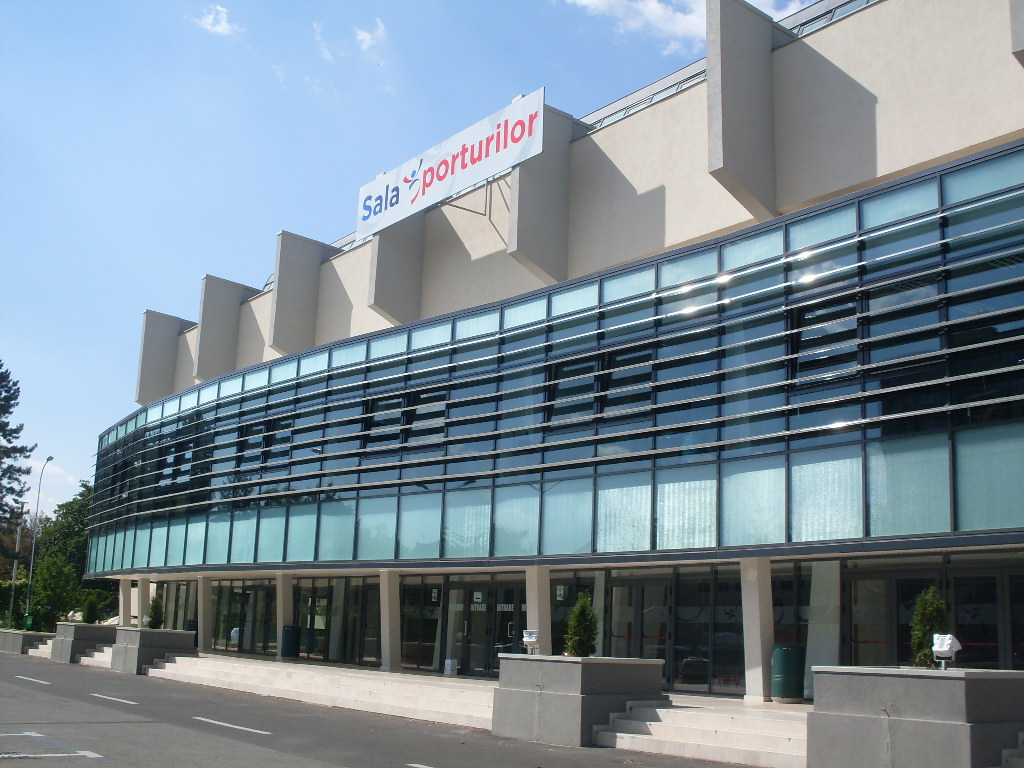
- View of venue (c.2013)
- Interactive map of Dumitru Popescu Colibași Sports Hall
- Address: 21 Gării Boulevard
- Location: Brașov, Romania
- Owner: Brașov Council
- Capacity: 1,700

Construction
- Groundbreaking: 1973
- Opened: 1975
- Renovated: 2007, 2011–2013

Dumitru Popescu Colibași Sports Hall is an indoor arena located in Brașov, Romania, with a total capacity of 1,700 seats. It is primarily used by the women's handball team Corona Brașov. It also hosts cultural events, such as concerts.

== History ==
=== 2011–2013 renovation ===
Sala Sporturilor Dumitru Popescu Colibași's €7 million second renovation took place over two years. It began in 2011, extending the outside parking capacity, as well as giving it a more modern exterior look. The construction was completed for April 2013.

== Events ==
Among the major events it hosted there is the tennis game between Romania and Belarus, in the 2005 Davis Cup World Group.

In women's handball, it hosted several continental competition games played by the local team, such as the Challenge Cup final in the 2005–06 season, the Cup Winners' Cup final in the 2007–08 season, or in the EHF Cup, the semi-finals in the 2008–09 and the 2015–16 seasons.

== Gallery ==
Sala Sporturilor Dumitru Popescu Colibași

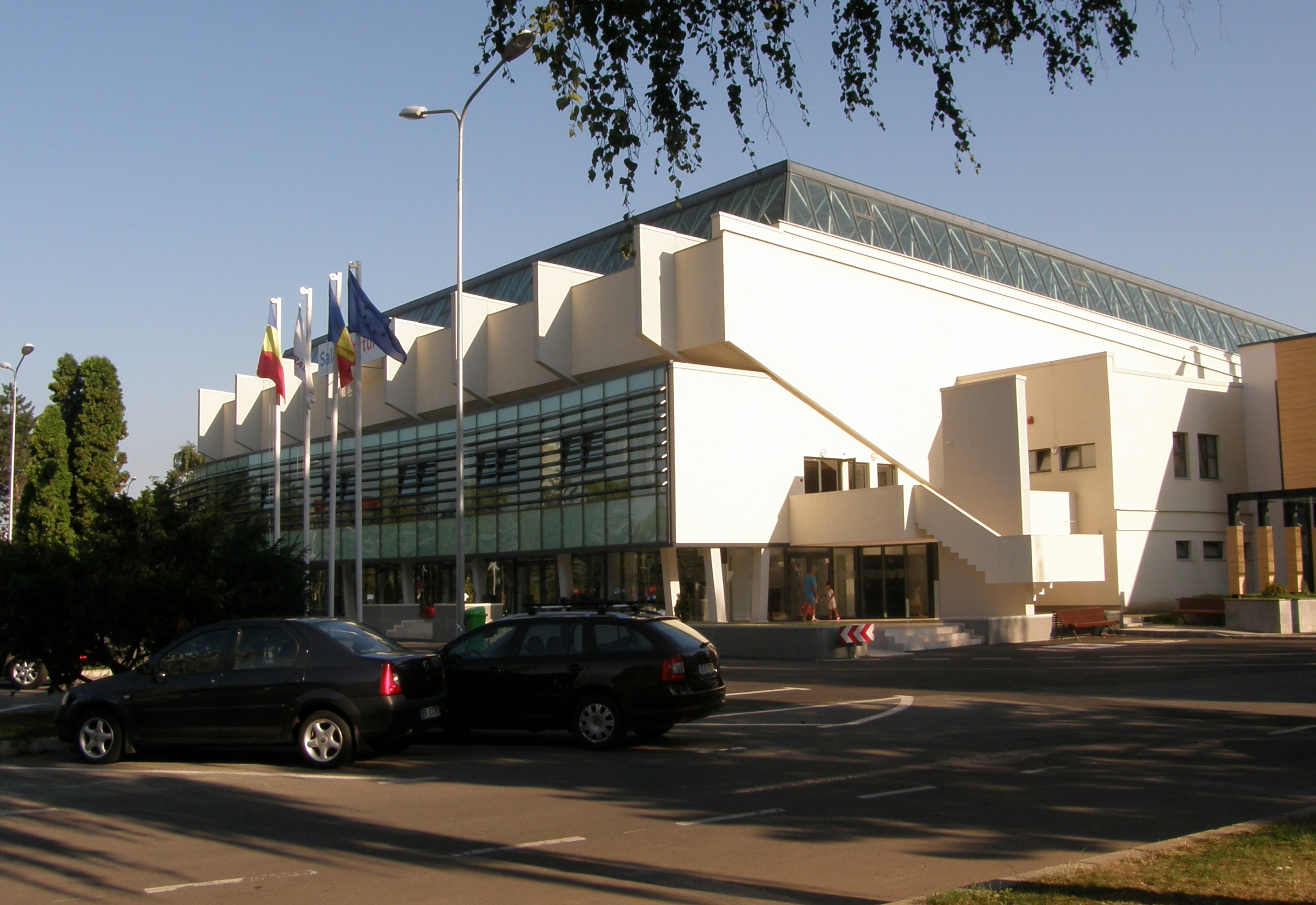

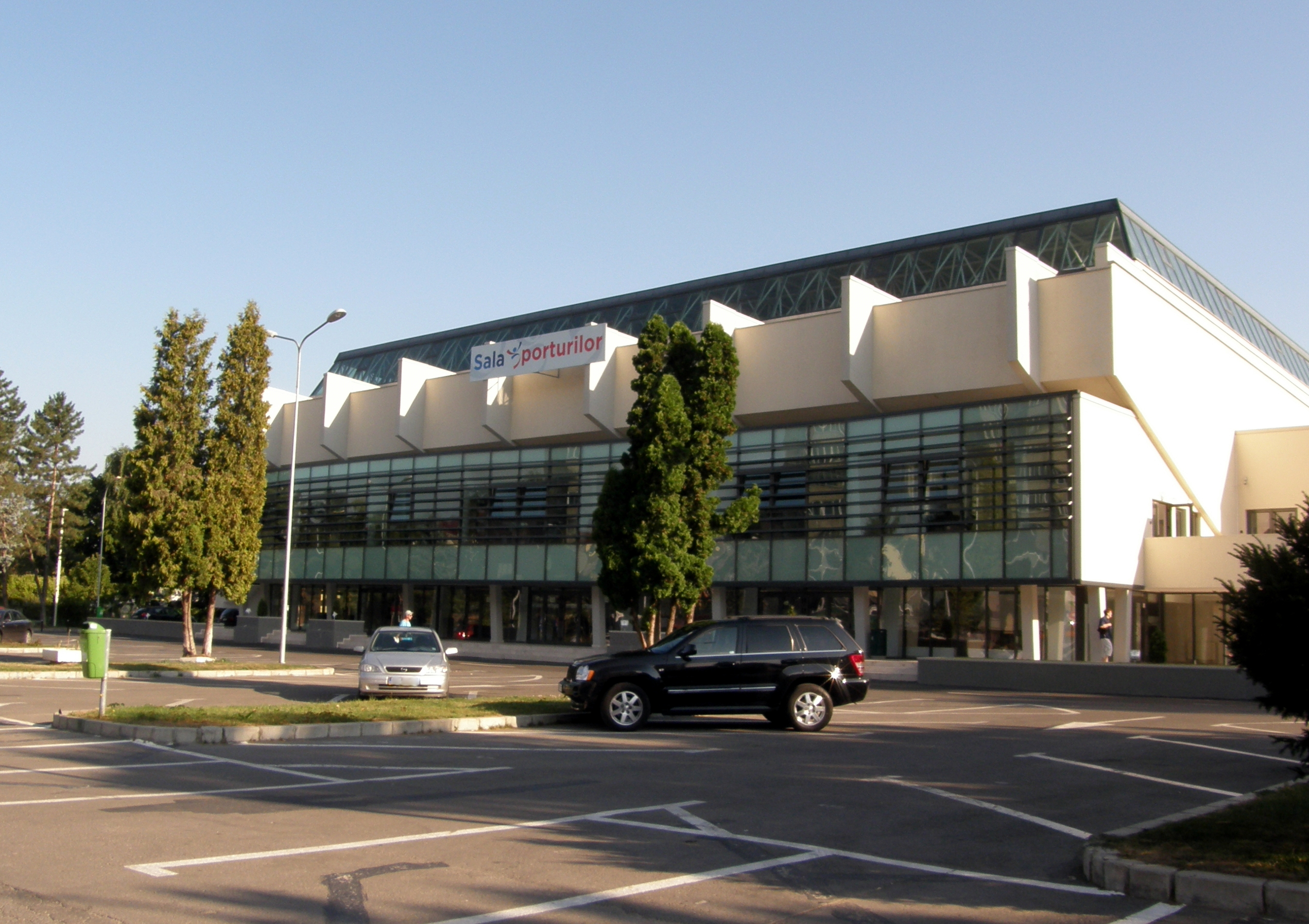

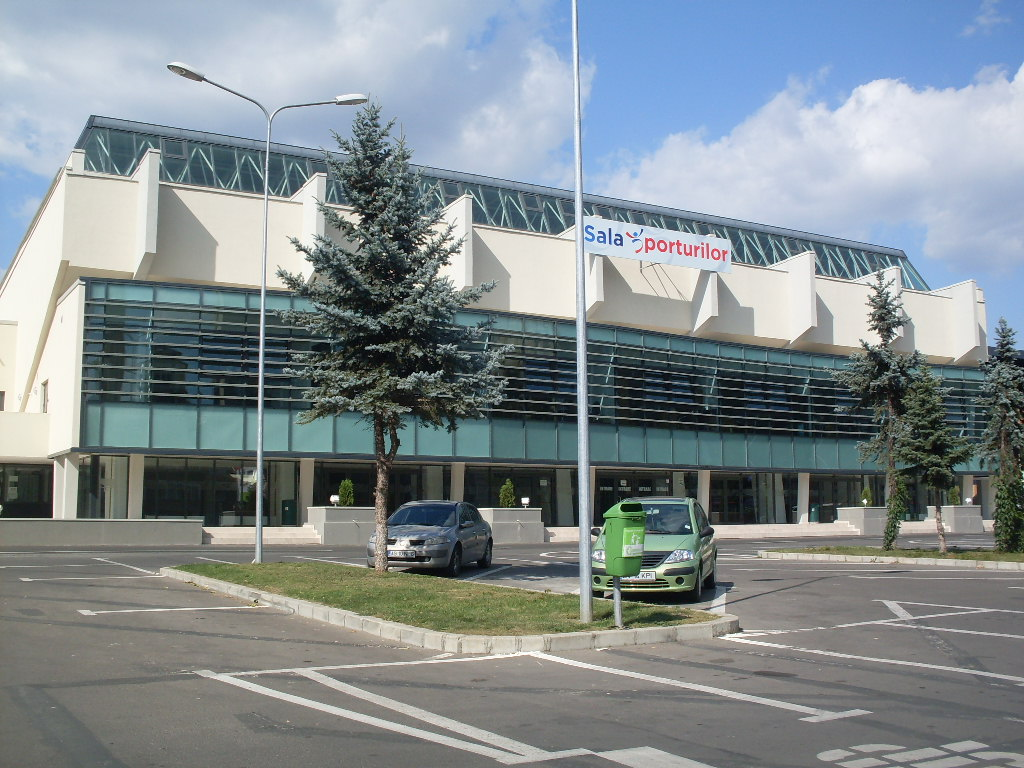
