= 2021 in UFC =

Mixed martial arts events

Information
- First date: January 16, 2021
- Last date: December 18, 2021

Events
- Total events: 43
- UFC: 13
- TUF Finale events: 1

Fights
- Total fights: 509
- Title fights: 19

Chronology
2020 in UFC	2021 in UFC	2022 in UFC

The year 2021 was the 29th year in the history of the Ultimate Fighting Championship (UFC), a mixed martial arts promotion based in the United States.

== 2021 by the numbers ==
The numbers below records the events, fights, techniques, champions and fighters held or performed for the year of 2021 in UFC.

Events
Number of Events	PPV	Continents	Countries	Cities	Fight Night Bonuses
43	11	2	2	6	182; Total $9,300,000
Longest Event	Shortest Event	Highest Income Live Gate	Lowest Income Live Gate	Highest Attendance	Lowest Attendance
UFC 263 3:19:32	UFC 197 1:34:57	UFC 264 $15,759,800	15 cards at the UFC Apex No reported income	UFC 268 20,715	15 cards at the UFC Apex; No crowd
Title Fights
Undisputed Title Fights	Title Changes	Champions Remained in Their Divisions	Number of Champions	Number of Interim Champions	Number of Title Defenses
18	6	6 FW – Alexander Volkanovski; WW – Kamaru Usman; MW – Israel Adesanya; HW – Francis Ngannou; WFYW – Valentina Shevchenko; WFW –Amanda Nunes	13	2	11
Champions
Division	Beginning of The Year	End of The Year	Division	Beginning of The Year	End of The Year
Heavyweight	Stipe Miocic	Francis Ngannou	Bantamweight	Petr Yan	Aljamain Sterling
Light Heavyweight	Jan Błachowicz	Glover Teixeira	Flyweight	Deiveson Figueiredo	Brandon Moreno
Middleweight	Israel Adesanya	Israel Adesanya	Women's Bantamweight	Amanda Nunes	Julianna Peña
Welterweight	Kamaru Usman	Kamaru Usman	Women's Flyweight	Valentina Shevchenko	Valentina Shevchenko
Lightweight	Khabib Nurmagomedov	Charles Oliveira	Women's Strawweight	Zhang Weili	Rose Namajunas
Featherweight	Alexander Volkanovski	Alexander Volkanovski	Women's Featherweight	Amanda Nunes	Amanda Nunes
Fights
Most Knockouts at A Single Event	Most submissions at A Single Event	Most Decisions at A Single Event	Total Number of Fights	Total Number of Cage Time	
UFC Fight Night: Holloway vs. Rodríguez 8	UFC 267; UFC 269 4	UFC 263 11	509	96:01:48	
Fighters
Number of Fighters	UFC Debutants	Releases / Retired	Fighters Suspended	Number of Fighters Missed weight	
(At the end of Dec 31, 2021); 612	88	110	33	46	
Champion feats
Aljamain Sterling became the first fighter to claim a championship via a disqualification when he won the bantamweight championship at UFC 259.; Francis Ngannou became the first Cameroon-born UFC champion.; Rose Namajunas became the first female in UFC history to have two title reigns in the same weight class with her strawweight championship victory at UFC 261.; Charles Oliveira won a UFC championship after 28 bouts, the most in history before claiming a title.; Brandon Moreno became the first Mexican-born champion.; Ciryl Gane became the first French-born champion with his interim heavyweight title win.; Glover Teixeira, at age 42, became the oldest first-time champion with his light heavyweight title win.
Fighter feats
Dustin Poirier set the record for most knockouts in lightweight history with his eighth (which would later be broken by Drew Dober in 2025); Vicente Luque set the record for most D'Arche choke submissions with his fourth.; Abdul Razak Alhassan set the record for the fastest head-kick victory at 17 seconds.; Marvin Vettori's 190 significant strikes set the record for the most in a light heavyweight fight.; Petr Yan and Cory Sandhagen's combined 318 significant strikes set the record for the most in a bantamweight bout.; Chris Barnett became the first heavyweight to win by a spinning wheel kick.; Shane Burgos and Billy Quarantillo's combined 357 significant strikes set the record for the most in a three-round bout.; Max Holloway became the first fighter to land an overall 3,000 significant strikes with his victory at UFC Fight Night 197.; Justin Tafa became the first heavyweight to miss weight after weighing one pound over the weight limit at UFC Fight Night 199.; Derrick Lewis became the leader of the most knockouts in UFC history with his 13th at UFC Fight Night 199.

== 2021 UFC Honors awards ==
Starting in 2019, the UFC created year-end awards with "UFC Honors President's Choice Awards" for categories "Performance of the Year" and "Fight of the Year" being chosen by UFC CEO Dana White. The other "UFC Honors Fan Choice Awards" are for categories "Knockout of the Year", "Submission of the Year", "Event of the Year", "Comeback of the Year" and, from 2020, "Debut of the Year" in which fans are able to vote for the winner on social media.

Winners receive a trophy commemorating their achievement along with a set of tires from sponsor Toyo Tires.

2021 UFC Honors Awards
	Performance of the Year	Fight of the Year	Knockout of the Year	Submission of the Year	Debut of the Year	Event of the Year	Comeback of the Year
Winner	Julianna Peña defeats Amanda Nunes 1 UFC 269	Justin Gaethje defeats Michael Chandler; UFC 268	Kamaru Usman defeats Jorge Masvidal 2 UFC 261	Brandon Moreno defeats Deiveson Figueiredo 2 UFC 263	Michael Chandler defeats Dan Hooker; UFC 257	UFC 268: Usman vs. Covington 2	Charles Oliveira defeats Michael Chandler 1 UFC 262
Nominee	Rose Namajunas defeats Zhang Weili 1 UFC 261	Max Holloway defeats Yair Rodríguez; UFC Fight Night: Holloway vs. Rodríguez	Rose Namajunas defeats Zhang Weili 1 UFC 261	Khamzat Chimaev defeats Li Jingliang; UFC 267	Terrance McKinney defeats Matt Frevola; UFC 263	UFC 267: Błachowicz vs. Teixeira	Anthony Hernandez defeats Rodolfo Vieira; UFC 258
Nominee	Kamaru Usman defeats Jorge Masvidal 2 UFC 261	Alexander Volkanovski defeats Brian Ortega; UFC 266	Ignacio Bahamondes defeats Roosevelt Roberts; UFC on ESPN: Cannonier vs. Gastelum	Vicente Luque defeats Tyron Woodley; UFC 260	Alex Pereira defeats Andreas Michailidis; UFC 268	UFC Fight Night: Holloway vs. Rodríguez	Julian Marquez defeats Maki Pitolo; UFC 258
Nominee	Brandon Moreno defeats Deiveson Figueiredo 2 UFC 263	Jiří Procházka defeats Dominick Reyes; UFC on ESPN: Reyes vs. Procházka	Jiří Procházka defeats Dominick Reyes; UFC on ESPN: Reyes vs. Procházka	Glover Teixeira defeats Jan Błachowicz; UFC 267	Paddy Pimblett defeats Luigi Vendramini; UFC Fight Night: Brunson vs. Till	UFC 261: Usman vs. Masvidal 2	Merab Dvalishvili defeats Marlon Moraes; UFC 266
Nominee	Charles Oliveira defeats Dustin Poirier; UFC 269	Petr Yan defeats Cory Sandhagen; UFC 267	—N/a	—N/a	—N/a	—N/a	—N/a
Ref							

== 2021 UFC.com awards ==
2021 UFC.COM Awards
No	The Fighters	The Upsets	The Submissions	The Newcomers	The Knockouts	The Fights
1	Kamaru Usman	Julianna Peña defeats Amanda Nunes 1 UFC 278	André Muniz defeats Ronaldo Souza; UFC 262	Casey O'Neill	Kamaru Usman defeats Jorge Masvidal 2 UFC 261	Justin Gaethje defeats Michael Chandler; UFC 268
2	Charles Oliveira	Anthony Hernandez defeats Rodolfo Vieira; UFC 258	Anthony Hernandez defeats Rodolfo Vieira; UFC 258	Manon Fiorot	Jiří Procházka defeats Dominick Reyes; UFC on ESPN: Reyes vs. Procházka	Alexander Volkanovski defeats Brian Ortega; UFC 266
3	Ciryl Gane	Gerald Meerschaert defeats Makhmud Muradov; UFC on ESPN: Barboza vs. Chikadze	Vicente Luque defeats Tyron Woodley; UFC 260	Michael Chandler	Cory Sandhagen defeats Frankie Edgar; UFC Fight Night: Overeem vs. Volkov	Max Holloway defeats Yair Rodríguez; UFC Fight Night: Holloway vs. Rodríguez
4	Rose Namajunas	Terrance McKinney defeats Matt Frevola; UFC 263	Brandon Moreno defeats Deiveson Figueiredo 2 UFC 263	Chris Curtis	Rose Namajunas defeats Zhang Weili 1 UFC 261	Petr Yan defeats Cory Sandhagen; UFC 267
5	Islam Makhachev	Jan Błachowicz defeats Israel Adesanya; UFC 259	Amanda Nunes defeats Megan Anderson; UFC 259	Erin Blanchfield	Ignacio Bahamondes defeats Roosevelt Roberts; UFC on ESPN: Cannonier vs. Gastelum	Jiří Procházka defeats Dominick Reyes; UFC on ESPN: Reyes vs. Procházka
6	Max Holloway	Dustin Poirier defeats Conor McGregor 2 UFC 257	Vicente Luque defeats Michael Chiesa; UFC 265	Loopy Godínez	Francis Ngannou defeats Stipe Miocic 2 UFC 260	Edson Barboza defeats Shane Burgos; UFC 262
7	Brandon Moreno	Beneil Dariush defeats Tony Ferguson; UFC 262	Islam Makhachev defeats Drew Dober; UFC 259	Terrance McKinney	Terrance McKinney defeats Matt Frevola; UFC 263	Ricky Turcios defeats Brady Hiestand; UFC on ESPN: Barboza vs. Chikadze
8	Glover Teixeira	Montserrat Ruiz defeats Cheyanne Vlismas; UFC on ESPN: Brunson vs. Holland	Clay Guida defeats Leonardo Santos; UFC on ESPN: Font vs. Aldo	Bruno Silva	Chris Barnett defeats Gian Villante; UFC 268	Santiago Ponzinibbio defeats Miguel Baeza; UFC Fight Night: Rozenstruik vs. Sakai
9	Marina Rodriguez	Kennedy Nzechukwu defeats Carlos Ulberg; UFC 259	Khamzat Chimaev defeats Li Jingliang; UFC 267	Paddy Pimblett	Derrick Lewis defeats Curtis Blaydes; UFC Fight Night: Blaydes vs. Lewis	T.J. Dillashaw defeats Cory Sandhagen; UFC on ESPN: Sandhagen vs. Dillashaw
10	Julianna Peña	Norma Dumont defeats Aspen Ladd; UFC Fight Night: Ladd vs. Dumont	Julian Marquez defeats Maki Pitolo; UFC 258	Pat Sabatini	Dustin Poirier defeats Conor McGregor 2 UFC 257	Charles Oliveira defeats Michael Chandler 1 UFC 262
Ref						

== Releases and retirements ==
These fighters have either been released from their UFC contracts, announced their retirement or joined other promotions:

Month	Day	ISO	Fighter	Division	Reason	Ref
January	7	(United States)	Irwin Rivera	Bantamweight	Released	
January	20	(Republic of Ireland)	Rhys McKee	Welterweight	Released	
January	24	(United States)	Nik Lentz	Featherweight	Retired	
January	29	(United States)	Anthony Rocco Martin	Welterweight	Parted ways	
February	4	(Brazil)	Antônio Carlos Júnior	Middleweight	Released	
February	4	(United States)	Anthony Ivy	Welterweight	Released	
February	4	(United States)	Carlton Minus	Lightweight	Released	
February	4	(United States)	Cole Williams	Welterweight	Released	
February	4	(United States)	Sarah Moras	Women's Bantamweight	Released	
February	8	(Turkey)	Gökhan Saki	Light Heavyweight	Released	
February	15	(Netherlands)	Stefan Struve	Heavyweight	Retired	
February	17	(Russia)	Aleksandra Albu	Women's Strawweight	Released	
February	17	(Australia)	Alex Chambers	Women's Strawweight	Released	
February	17	(Jordan)	Ali Alqaisi	Bantamweight	Released	
February	17	(Serbia)	Bojan Mihajlović	Light Heavyweight	Released	
February	17	(United States)	Chris de la Rocha	Heavyweight	Released	
February	17	(Russia)	Dmitry Sosnovskiy	Heavyweight	Released	
February	17	(United States)	Suman Mokhtarian	Featherweight	Released	
February	17	(Japan)	Syuri Kondo	Women's Strawweight	Released	
February	17	(Brazil)	Vanessa Melo	Women's Bantamweight	Released	
February	18	(Russia)	Alexey Kunchenko	Welterweight	Signed with PFL	
February	25	(United States)	Martin Day	Bantamweight	Released	
February	28	(Brazil)	Vinicius Moreira	Light Heavyweight	Released	
March	2	(Russia)	Adam Yandiev	Middleweight	Released	
March	2	(Mexico)	José Alberto Quiñónez	Bantamweight	Released	
March	3	(Netherlands)	Alistair Overeem	Heavyweight	Released	
March	3	(Brazil)	Junior Dos Santos	Heavyweight	Released	
March	4	(Brazil)	Gabriel Silva	Bantamweight	Released	
March	4	(Brazil)	Geraldo de Freitas	Bantamweight	Released	
March	9	(Australia)	Megan Anderson	Women's Featherweight	Contract ended	
March	11	(United States)	Jordan Espinosa	Flyweight	Released	
March	11	(United States)	Shana Dobson	Women's Flyweight	Released	
March	29	(United States)	Brok Weaver	Lightweight	Released	
March	29	(United States)	Vince Cachero	Bantamweight	Released	
April	11	(United States)	Jimmy Flick	Flyweight	Retired	
April	24	(United States)	Tyron Woodley	Welterweight	Contract ended	
April	30	(United States)	Diego Sanchez	Welterweight	Released	
April	30	(United States)	Ray Rodriguez	Bantamweight	Released	
May	3	(Brazil)	Raphael Pessoa	Heavyweight	Suspended and released	
May	8	(United States)	Aalon Cruz	Lightweight	Released	
May	8	(United States)	Anthony Birchak	Bantamweight	Released	
May	8	(Poland)	Bartosz Fabiński	Middleweight	Released	
May	8	(United States)	Jordan Griffin	Featherweight	Released	
May	8	(Canada)	KB Bhullar	Middleweight	Released	
May	8	(United States)	Luke Sanders	Bantamweight	Released	
May	8	(United States)	Christian Aguilera	Welterweight	Released	
May	11	(United States)	Alan Jouban	Welterweight	Retired	
May	11	(United States)	Maurice Greene	Heavyweight	Released	
May	12	(United States)	Justine Kish	Women's Flyweight	Released	
May	13	(England)	Dan Hardy	Welterweight	Released	
May	20	(Brazil)	Ronaldo Souza	Middleweight	Released	
May	23	(United States)	Paul Felder	Lightweight	Retired	
May	23	(United States)	Yorgan De Castro	Heavyweight	Released	
July	1	(Serbia)	Stefan Sekulić	Welterweight	Released	
July	2	(Russia)	Alexander Yakovlev	Lightweight	Released	
July	2	(Norway)	Emil Weber Meek	Welterweight	Released	
July	2	(United States)	Joe Ellenberger	Lightweight	Released	
July	2	(Brazil)	Lara Procópio	Women's Flyweight	Released	
July	2	(Guam)	Roque Martinez	Heavyweight	Released	
July	13	(Bosnia and Herzegovina)	Mirsad Bektić	Featherweight	Retired	
July	14	(United States)	Marion Reneau	Women's Bantamweight	Retired	
August	4	(United States)	Nicco Montaño	Women's Flyweight	Released	
August	12	(United States)	Justin Jaynes	Featherweight	Released	
August	12	(United States)	Kai Kamaka III	Featherweight	Contract ended	
August	17	(United States)	Yancy Medeiros	Welterweight	Released	
August	21	(United States)	Jerome Rivera	Flyweight	Released	
August	21	(United States)	Ryan Benoit	Flyweight	Released	
August	23	(Brazil)	Demian Maia	Welterweight	End of contract	
August	23	(United States)	Jimmie Rivera	Bantamweight	End of contract	
August	31	(England)	Darren Stewart	Middleweight	Released	
September	2	(Brazil)	Antônio Braga Neto	Middleweight	Released	
September	2	(Uzbekistan)	Liliya Shakirova	Women's Flyweight	Released	
September	3	(United States)	Emily Whitmire	Women's Flyweight	Released	
September	15	(United States)	Joseph Benavidez	Flyweight	Retired	
September	16	(United States)	Carlos Condit	Welterweight	Retired	
September	17	(Brazil)	Anderson dos Santos	Bantamweight	Released	
September	17	(United States)	Drako Rodriguez	Bantamweight	Released	
September	17	(United States)	Jamey Simmons	Bantamweight	Released	
September	17	(United States)	Roosevelt Roberts	Lightweight	Released	
September	21	(South Africa)	Don Madge	Lightweight	Signed with PFL	
October	1	(Brazil)	Antônio Arroyo	Middleweight	Released	
October	1	(United States)	Mike Rodríguez	Light Heavyweight	Released	
October	1	(United States)	Sarah Alpar	Women's Flyweight	Released	
October	1	(Brazil)	Thomas Almeida	Bantamweight	Released	
October	2	(Brazil)	Bethe Correia	Women's Bantamweight	Retired	
October	7	(Brazil)	Johnny Eduardo	Bantamweight	Released	
October	13	(United States)	Luis Peña	Lightweight	Released	
October	20	(Lithuania)	Modestas Bukauskas	Light Heavyweight	Released	
October	26	(United States)	Mike Perry	Welterweight	Signed with BKFC	
October	28	(United States)	Andrew Sanchez	Middleweight	Released	
November	2	(Argentina)	Laureano Staropoli	Middleweight	Released	
November	7	(United States)	Gian Villante	Heavyweight	Retired	
November	10	(Canada)	Randa Markos	Women's Strawweight	Released	
November	11	(Brazil)	Lívia Renata Souza	Women's Strawweight	Released	
November	14	(United States)	Khama Worthy	Lightweight	Released	
November	15	(Finland)	Teemu Packalén	Lightweight	Retired	
November	17	(Georgia (country))	Liana Jojua	Women's Flyweight	Released	
November	19	(United States)	Al Iaquinta	Lightweight	Retired	
November	19	(Brazil)	John Allan	Light Heavyweight	Released	
November	20	(India)	Bharat Khandare	Featherweight	Released	
November	30	(United States)	Kevin Lee	Welterweight	Released	
December	2	(Canada)	Felicia Spencer	Women's Featherweight	Retired	
December	2	(United States)	Impa Kasanganay	Welterweight	Released	
December	14	(Brazil)	Michel Prazeres	Welterweight	Released	
December	17	(Brazil)	Cláudia Gadelha	Women's Strawweight	Retired	

== Debut UFC fighters ==
The following fighters fought their first UFC fight in 2021:

Month	Day	ISO	Fighter	Division	Event
January	16	(Panama)	Joselyne Edwards	Women's Bantamweight	UFC on ABC 1
January	20	(Brazil)	Francisco Figueiredo	Flyweight	UFC on ESPN 20
January	20	(Belgium)	Gaetano Pirrello	Bantamweight	UFC on ESPN 20
January	20	(France)	Manon Fiorot	Women's Flyweight	UFC on ESPN 20
January	20	(Wales)	Mason Jones	Lightweight	UFC on ESPN 20
January	20	(Kazakhstan)	Sergey Morozov	Bantamweight	UFC on ESPN 20
January	20	(Russia)	Umar Nurmagomedov	Bantamweight	UFC on ESPN 20
January	20	(United States)	Victoria Leonardo	Women's Flyweight	UFC on ESPN 20
January	24	(United States)	Michael Chandler	Lightweight	UFC 257
February	13	(United States)	Philip Rowe	Welterweight	UFC 258
February	20	(Scotland)	Casey O'Neill	Women's Flyweight	UFC Fight Night 185
February	20	(United States)	Drako Rodriguez	Bantamweight	UFC Fight Night 185
February	20	(United States)	Jared Vanderaa	Heavyweight	UFC Fight Night 185
February	27	(United States)	Ronnie Lawrence	Bantamweight	UFC Fight Night 186
March	6	(New Zealand)	Carlos Ulberg	Light Heavyweight	UFC 259
March	6	(Serbia)	Uroš Medić	Lightweight	UFC 259
March	13	(Brazil)	Gloria de Paula	Women's Strawweight	UFC Fight Night 187
March	13	(Argentina)	Marcelo Rojo	Bantamweight	UFC Fight Night 187
March	13	(Mexico)	Rafa García	Lightweight	UFC Fight Night 187
March	20	(United States)	Cheyanne Vlismas	Women's Strawweight	UFC on ESPN 21
March	20	(United States)	Harry Hunsucker	Heavyweight	UFC on ESPN 21
March	20	(United States)	Jesse Strader	Bantamweight	UFC on ESPN 21
March	20	(South Africa)	JP Buys	Flyweight	UFC on ESPN 21
March	20	(Mexico)	Montserrat Ruiz	Women's Strawweight	UFC on ESPN 21
March	27	(United States)	Fabio Cherant	Light Heavyweight	UFC 260
April	10	(Chile)	Ignacio Bahamondes	Lightweight	UFC on ABC 2
April	10	(United States)	Luis Saldaña	Featherweight	UFC on ABC 2
April	17	(United States)	Dakota Bush	Lightweight	UFC on ESPN 22
April	17	(Mexico)	Lupita Godinez	Women's Strawweight	UFC on ESPN 22
April	24	(China)	Aori Qileng	Bantamweight	UFC 261
April	24	(United States)	Jeff Molina	Flyweight	UFC 261
April	24	(China)	Na Liang	Women's Strawweight	UFC 261
April	24	(United States)	Pat Sabatini	Featherweight	UFC 261
April	24	(China)	Rong Zhu	Lightweight	UFC 261
May	1	(Brazil)	Luana Pinheiro	Women's Strawweight	UFC on ESPN 23
May	8	(Guyana)	Carlston Harris	Welterweight	UFC on ESPN 24
May	15	(United States)	Tucker Lutz	Featherweight	UFC 262
May	22	(United States)	Chris Barnett	Heavyweight	UFC Fight Night 188
May	22	(Colombia)	Juancamilo Ronderos	Flyweight	UFC Fight Night 188
May	22	(Brazil)	Rafael Alves	Lightweight	UFC Fight Night 188
May	22	(China)	Shayilan Nuerdanbieke	Featherweight	UFC Fight Night 188
June	5	(Brazil)	Gregory Rodrigues	Middleweight	UFC Fight Night 189
June	5	(United States)	Kamuela Kirk	Featherweight	UFC Fight Night 189
June	5	(Brazil)	Tabatha Ricci	Women's Strawweight	UFC Fight Night 189
June	12	(United States)	Terrance McKinney	Lightweight	UFC 263
June	19	(Brazil)	Bruno Silva	Middleweight	UFC on ESPN 25
June	26	(United States)	Jeremiah Wells	Welterweight	UFC Fight Night 190
July	10	(United States)	Kris Moutinho	Bantamweight	UFC 264
July	17	(United States)	Preston Parsons	Welterweight	UFC on ESPN 26
July	24	(United States)	Elise Reed	Women's Strawweight	UFC on ESPN 27
July	31	(United States)	Collin Anglin	Featherweight	UFC on ESPN 28
July	31	(Armenia)	Melsik Baghdasaryan	Featherweight	UFC on ESPN 28
July	31	(United States)	Orion Cosce	Welterweight	UFC on ESPN 28
August	7	(Brazil)	Melissa Gatto	Women's Flyweight	UFC 265
August	21	(Brazil)	Josiane Nunes	Women's Bantamweight	UFC on ESPN 29
August	21	(Uzbekistan)	Saidyokub Kakhramonov	Bantamweight	UFC on ESPN 29
August	28	(United States)	Andre Petroski	Middleweight	UFC on ESPN 30
August	28	(United States)	Brady Hiestand	Bantamweight	UFC on ESPN 30
August	28	(United States)	Bryan Battle	Middleweight	UFC on ESPN 30
August	28	(United States)	Gilbert Urbina	Welterweight	UFC on ESPN 30
August	28	(United States)	Leomana Martinez	Bantamweight	UFC on ESPN 30
August	28	(United States)	Micheal Gillmore	Welterweight	UFC on ESPN 30
September	4	(Georgia (country))	Liudvik Sholinian	Bantamweight	UFC Fight Night 191
September	4	(England)	Paddy Pimblett	Lightweight	UFC Fight Night 191
September	18	(United States)	Brandon Jenkins	Lightweight	UFC Fight Night 192
September	18	(United States)	Erin Blanchfield	Women's Flyweight	UFC Fight Night 192
September	18	(Germany)	Mandy Böhm	Women's Flyweight	UFC Fight Night 192
September	25	(United States)	Cody Brundage	Middleweight	UFC 266
September	25	(United States)	Martin Sano Jr.	Welterweight	UFC 266
September	25	(United States)	Nick Maximov	Middleweight	UFC 266
October	2	(United States)	Mike Breeden	Lightweight	UFC Fight Night 193
October	9	(Argentina)	Silvana Gómez Juárez	Women's Strawweight	UFC Fight Night 194
October	16	(United States)	Erick Gonzalez	Lightweight	UFC Fight Night 195
October	16	(Brazil)	Istela Nunes	Women's Strawweight	UFC Fight Night 195
October	23	(Brazil)	Daniel Lacerda	Flyweight	UFC Fight Night 196
October	23	(Uganda)	David Onama	Featherweight	UFC Fight Night 196
October	23	(Brazil)	Maria de Oliveira Neta	Women's Strawweight	UFC Fight Night 196
October	23	(Georgia (country))	Zviad Lazishvili	Bantamweight	UFC Fight Night 196
November	6	(Brazil)	Alex Pereira	Middleweight	UFC 268
November	6	(Brazil)	Bruno Souza	Featherweight	UFC 268
November	6	(United States)	Chris Curtis	Middleweight	UFC 268
November	6	(United States)	C.J. Vergara	Flyweight	UFC 268
November	6	(Republic of Ireland)	Ian Machado Garry	Welterweight	UFC 268
November	20	(Israel)	Natan Levy	Lightweight	UFC Fight Night 198
December	4	(United States)	Darian Weeks	Welterweight	UFC on ESPN 31

== Suspended fighters ==
The list below is based on fighters suspended either by (1) United States Anti-Doping Agency (USADA) or World Anti-Doping Agency (WADA) for violation of taking prohibited substances or non-analytical incidents, (2) by local commissions on misconduct during the fights or at event venues, or (3) by the UFC for reasons also stated below.

ISO	Name	Nickname	Division	From	Duration	Tested positive for / Info	By	Eligible to fight again	Ref.	Notes
United States	T.J. Dillashaw		Bantamweight	Jan 18, 2019	1 year (NYSAC); 2 years (USADA)	Erythropoietin (EPO).	NYSAC and USADA	Jan 18, 2021		
Brazil	Michel Prazeres		Welterweight	Mar 9, 2019	2 years	Exogenous boldenone and its metabolite 5β-androst-1-en-17β-ol-3-one.	USADA	Mar 9, 2021		
Brazil	Bruno Silva	Blindado	Middleweight	Jun 14, 2019	2 years	Boldenone and its metabolite.	USADA	Jun 14, 2021		
Brazil	Giacomo Lemos		Heavyweight	Jul 9, 2019	2 years	Drostanolone and its metabolite 2α-methyl-5α-androstan-3α-ol-17-one.	USADA	Jul 9, 2021		
Brazil	Istela Nunes		Women's Strawweight	Jul 22, 2019	2 years	Stanozolol metabolites 16β-hydroxystanozolol and 3′-hydroxystanozolol.	USADA	Jul 22, 2021		
Brazil	Raphael Pessoa	Bebezão	Heavyweight	Mar 4, 2020	1 year	hydrochlorothiazide and its metabolites chlorothiazide and 4-amino-6-chloro-1,3-benzenedisulfonamide	USADA	Mar 4, 2021		
United States	Chase Sherman	The Vanilla Gorilla	Heavyweight	May 13, 2020	9 months	Anastrozole	USADA	Feb 13, 2021		
Ukraine	Aleksander Doskalchuk		Flyweight	Jun 6, 2020	14 months	Mesterolone.	USADA	Aug 6, 2021		
Canada	Marc-Andre Barriault	Power Bar	Middleweight	Jul 21, 2020	6 months	Ostarine	USADA	Jan 21, 2021		
Canada	Jesse Ronson	The Body Snatcher	Welterweight	Jul 22, 2020	20 months	Metandienone	USADA	Mar 22, 2022		
Mexico	Jorge Gonzalez	George St.	Light Heavyweight	Aug 5, 2020	2 years	Stanozolol metabolites, drostanolone metabolite and tamoxifen metabolite.	USADA	Aug 5, 2022		
Morocco	Abu Azaitar	Gladiator	Middleweight	Aug 25, 2020	7 months	tamoxifen and/or tamoxifen metabolite 3-hydroxy-4-methoxy-tamoxifen	USADA	Mar 25, 2021		
Mexico	Yair Rodríguez	El Pantera	Featherweight	Sep 8, 2020	6 months	3 Whereabouts Failures in Last Year	USADA	Mar 8, 2021		
United States	Kevin Croom	The Hard Hitting Hillbilly	Lightweight	Sep 19, 2020	4 1/2 months	Marijuana	NSAC	Jan 26, 2021		With addition of $1,800 fine
United States	Niko Price	The Hybrid	Welterweight	Sep 19, 2020	6 months	Marijuana	NSAC	Mar 19, 2021		With addition of $8,500 fine
Poland	Oskar Piechota	Imadło	Middleweight	Sep 25, 2020	22 months	Growth hormone releasing peptide 2 (GHRP-2 or pralmorelin) and GHRP-2 (1-3) free acid, a metabolite of GHRP-2,	USADA	Jul 25, 2022		
United States	Charlie Ontiveros	The American Badboy	Welterweight	Oct 30, 2020	6 months	Chlorodehydromethyltestosterone metabolites	NSAC	Apr 30, 2021		With addition of $2,245.36
United States	Raquel Pennington	Rocky	Women's Bantamweight	Nov 7, 2020	6 months	7-Keto-DHEA and AOD-9064	USADA	May 7, 2021		Self-reporting doping violation when she found out she had ingested banned substances prescribed by her doctor to help treat a medical condition
Uzbekistan	Liliya Shakirova		Women's Flyweight	Dec 5, 2020	2 years	Meldonium	USADA	Dec 5, 2022		
Brazil	Geraldo de Freitas	Spartan	Bantamweight	Jan 11, 2021	2 years	Exogenous administration of testosterone and/or its precursors	USADA	Jan 11, 2023		
Brazil	Raphael Pessoa	Bebezão	Heavyweight	Feb 9, 2021	2 years	7-Keto-DHEA and AOD-9064 Hydrochlorothiazide (HCTZ) and its metabolites Chlorothiazide and 4-amino-6-chloro-1,3-benzenedisulfonamide (ACB)	USADA	Feb 9, 2023		Second USADA violation. Results collected from out-of-competition on February 9, 2021, February 15, 2021, February 16, 2021, and March 4, 2021. Ressoa also evaded sample collection on January 25, 2021, and January 28, 2021.
Brazil	Rogério Bontorin		Bantamweight	May 1, 2021	3 months	Hydrochlorothiazide	USADA	Aug 1, 2021		
Colombia	Juancamilo Ronderos	100	Flyweight	May 22, 2021	1 month	Cocaine and its metabolite benzoylecgonine	USADA	June 22, 2021		
United States	Chris Barnett	Huggy Bear/Beastboy	Heavyweight	May 22, 2021	4 1/2 months	Marijuana	NSAC	Oct 26, 2021		
United States	Daniel Pineda	The Pit	Featherweight	June 26, 2021	9 months	Amphetamine	NSAC	Mar 26, 2022		
Brazil	Rodrigo Nascimento	Yogi Bear	Heavyweight	July 17, 2021	6 months	Ritalinic acid	NSAC	Jan 17, 2022		
United States	Ryan Benoit	Baby Face	Flyweight	July 31, 2021	9 months	Modafinil	NSAC	April 1, 2022		
Brazil	Michel Prazeres	Tractor	Welterweight	Aug 27, 2021	4 years	Clomiphene, Oxandrolone metabolites, and the Exogenous administration of testosterone and/or its precursors	NSAC	Aug 27, 2025		Second USADA violation
United States	Kevin Lee	The Motown Phenom	Welterweight	Aug 28, 2021	6 months	Adderall	NSAC	Feb 28, 2022		$19,526 Fine
United States	Josh Quinlan	The Maverick	Welterweight	Sep 7, 2021	9 months	Drostanolone	NSAC	June 7, 2022		
Poland	Łukasz Brzeski	The Bull	Heavyweight	Sep 14, 2021	9 months	Clomiphene	NSAC	June 14, 2022		$750 Fine
Brazil	Carlos Felipe	Boi	Heavyweight	Oct 16, 2021	18 months	Boldenone and its metabolites	NSAC	Apr 16, 2023		$4,200 fine and $489 in prosecution fees
Georgia	Zviad Lazishvili		Bantamweight	Oct 23, 2021	9 months	Clomiphene	NSAC	July 24, 2022		$1,800 fine and $326 in prosecution fees

== The Ultimate Fighter ==
The following The Ultimate Fighter seasons are scheduled for broadcast in 2021:

Season	Division	Winner	Runner-up	Ref
The Ultimate Fighter 29	Middleweight	Bryan Battle	Gilbert Urbina	
The Ultimate Fighter 29	Bantamweight	Ricky Turcios	Brady Hiestand	

== Title fights ==
Title fights in 2021
Weight class				Method	Round	Time	Event	Notes
Welterweight	Kamaru Usman (c)	def.	Gilbert Burns	TKO (punches)	3	0:34	UFC 258	(Note: For the UFC Welterweight Championship.)
Bantamweight	Aljamain Sterling	def.	Petr Yan (c)	DQ (illegal knee)	4	4:29	UFC 259	(Note: For the UFC Bantamweight Championship.)
Women's Featherweight	Amanda Nunes (c)	def.	Megan Anderson	Submission (triangle armbar)	1	2:03	UFC 259	(Note: For the UFC Women's Featherweight Championship.)
Light Heavyweight	Jan Błachowicz (c)	def.	Israel Adesanya	Decision (unanimous) (49–46, 49–45, 49–45)	5	5:00	UFC 259	(Note: For the UFC Light Heavyweight Championship.)
Heavyweight	Francis Ngannou	def.	Stipe Miocic (c)	KO (punch)	2	0:52	UFC 260	(Note: For the UFC Heavyweight Championship.)
Women's Flyweight	Valentina Shevchenko (c)	def.	Jessica Andrade	TKO (elbows)	2	3:19	UFC 261	(Note: For the UFC Women's Flyweight Championship.)
Women's Strawweight	Rose Namajunas	def.	Zhang Weili (c)	KO (head kick)	1	1:18	UFC 261	(Note: For the UFC Women's Strawweight Championship.)
Welterweight	Kamaru Usman (c)	def.	Jorge Masvidal	KO (punch)	2	1:02	UFC 261	(Note: For the UFC Welterweight Championship.)
Lightweight	Charles Oliveira	def.	Michael Chandler	TKO (punches)	2	0:19	UFC 262	(Note: For the vacant UFC Lightweight Championship.)
Flyweight	Brandon Moreno	def.	Deiveson Figueiredo (c)	Submission (rear-naked choke)	3	2:26	UFC 263	(Note: For the UFC Flyweight Championship.)
Middleweight	Israel Adesanya (c)	def.	Marvin Vettori	Decision (unanimous) (50–45, 50–45, 50–45)	5	5:00	UFC 263	(Note: For the UFC Middleweight Championship.)
Heavyweight	Ciryl Gane	def.	Derrick Lewis	TKO (punches)	3	4:11	UFC 265	(Note: For the interim UFC Heavyweight Championship.)
Women's Flyweight	Valentina Shevchenko (c)	def.	Lauren Murphy	TKO (punches and elbows)	4	4:00	UFC 266	(Note: For the UFC Women's Flyweight Championship.)
Featherweight	Alexander Volkanovski (c)	def.	Brian Ortega	Decision (unanimous)(49–46, 50–45, 50–44)	5	5:00	UFC 266	(Note: For the UFC Featherweight Championship.)
Bantamweight	Petr Yan	def.	Cory Sandhagen	Decision (unanimous) (49–46, 49–46, 49–46)	5	5:00	UFC 267	(Note: For the interim UFC Bantamweight Championship.)
Light Heavyweight	Glover Teixeira	def.	Jan Błachowicz (c)	Submission (rear-naked choke)	2	3:02	UFC 267	(Note: For the UFC Light Heavyweight Championship.)
Women's Strawweight	Rose Namajunas (c)	def.	Zhang Weili	Decision (split) (47–48, 48–47, 49–46)	5	5:00	UFC 268	(Note: For the UFC Women's Strawweight Championship.)
Welterweight	Kamaru Usman (c)	def.	Colby Covington	Decision (unanimous) (48–47, 48–47, 49–46)	5	5:00	UFC 268	(Note: For the UFC Welterweight Championship.)
Women's Bantamweight	Julianna Peña	def.	Amanda Nunes (c)	Submission (rear-naked choke)	2	3:26	UFC 269	(Note: For the UFC Women's Bantamweight Championship.)
Lightweight	Charles Oliveira (c)	def.	Dustin Poirier	Submission (rear-naked choke)	3	1:02	UFC 269	(Note: For the UFC Lightweight Championship.)

== Events list ==
#	Event	Date	Venue	City	Country	Atten.	Ref.	Fight of the Night			Performance of the Night		Bonus	Ref.
589	UFC Fight Night: Lewis vs. Daukaus	Dec 18, 2021	UFC Apex	Las Vegas, Nevada	United States	N/A		Amanda Lemos	vs.	Angela Hill	Cub Swanson	Melissa Gatto	$50,000	
588	UFC 269: Oliveira vs. Poirier	Dec 11, 2021	T-Mobile Arena	Las Vegas, Nevada	United States	18,471		Dominick Cruz	vs.	Pedro Munhoz	Charles Oliveira	Julianna Peña	$50,000	
588	UFC 269: Oliveira vs. Poirier	Dec 11, 2021	T-Mobile Arena	Las Vegas, Nevada	United States	18,471		Dominick Cruz	vs.	Pedro Munhoz	Kai Kara-France	Sean O'Malley	$50,000	
588	UFC 269: Oliveira vs. Poirier	Dec 11, 2021	T-Mobile Arena	Las Vegas, Nevada	United States	18,471		Dominick Cruz	vs.	Pedro Munhoz	Tai Tuivasa	Bruno Silva	$50,000	
587	UFC on ESPN: Font vs. Aldo	Dec 4, 2021	UFC Apex	Las Vegas, Nevada	United States	N/A		Cheyanne Vlismas	vs.	Mallory Martin	Rafael Fiziev	Jamahal Hill	$50,000	
587	UFC on ESPN: Font vs. Aldo	Dec 4, 2021	UFC Apex	Las Vegas, Nevada	United States	N/A		Cheyanne Vlismas	vs.	Mallory Martin	Clay Guida	Chris Curtis	$50,000	
586	UFC Fight Night: Vieira vs. Tate	Nov 20, 2021	UFC Apex	Las Vegas, Nevada	United States	N/A		Adrian Yanez	vs.	Davey Grant	Taila Santos	—N/a	$50,000	
585	UFC Fight Night: Holloway vs. Rodríguez	Nov 13, 2021	UFC Apex	Las Vegas, Nevada	United States	N/A		Max Holloway	vs.	Yair Rodríguez	Khaos Williams	Andrea Lee	$50,000	
584	UFC 268: Usman vs Covington 2	Nov 6, 2021	Madison Square Garden	New York City, New York	United States	20,715		Justin Gaethje	vs.	Michael Chandler	Marlon Vera	Alex Pereira	$50,000	
584	UFC 268: Usman vs Covington 2	Nov 6, 2021	Madison Square Garden	New York City, New York	United States	20,715		Justin Gaethje	vs.	Michael Chandler	Bobby Green	Chris Barnett	$50,000	
583	UFC 267: Błachowicz vs. Teixeira	Oct 30, 2021	Etihad Arena	Abu Dhabi	United Arab Emirates	20,715		Petr Yan	vs.	Cory Sandhagen	Glover Teixeira	Khamzat Chimaev	$50,000	
582	UFC Fight Night: Costa vs. Vettori	Oct 23, 2021	UFC Apex	Las Vegas, Nevada	United States	N/A		Gregory Rodrigues	vs.	Jun Yong Park	Marvin Vettori	Alex Caceres	$50,000	
581	UFC Fight Night: Ladd vs. Dumont	Oct 16, 2021	UFC Apex	Las Vegas, Nevada	United States	N/A		—N/a			Jim Miller	Nate Landwehr	$50,000	
581	UFC Fight Night: Ladd vs. Dumont	Oct 16, 2021	UFC Apex	Las Vegas, Nevada	United States	N/A		—N/a			Bruno Silva	Danaa Batgerel	$50,000	
580	UFC Fight Night: Dern vs. Rodriguez	Oct 9, 2021	UFC Apex	Las Vegas, Nevada	United States	N/A		Marina Rodriguez	vs.	Mackenzie Dern	Mariya Agapova	Lupita Godinez	$50,000	
579	UFC Fight Night: Santos vs. Walker	Oct 2, 2021	UFC Apex	Las Vegas, Nevada	United States	N/A		—N/a			Casey O'Neill	Jamie Mullarkey	$50,000	
579	UFC Fight Night: Santos vs. Walker	Oct 2, 2021	UFC Apex	Las Vegas, Nevada	United States	N/A		—N/a			Douglas Silva de Andrade	Alejandro Pérez	$50,000	
578	UFC 266: Volkanovski vs. Ortega	Sep 25, 2021	T-Mobile Arena	Las Vegas, Nevada	United States	19,029		Alexander Volkanovski	vs.	Brian Ortega	Chris Daukaus	Merab Dvalishvili	$50,000	
577	UFC Fight Night: Smith vs. Spann	Sep 18, 2021	UFC Apex	Las Vegas, Nevada	United States	N/A		—N/a			Anthony Smith	Arman Tsarukyan	$50,000	
577	UFC Fight Night: Smith vs. Spann	Sep 18, 2021	UFC Apex	Las Vegas, Nevada	United States	N/A		—N/a			Nate Maness	Joaquin Buckley	$50,000	
576	UFC Fight Night: Brunson vs. Till	Sep 4, 2021	UFC Apex	Las Vegas, Nevada	United States	N/A		Molly McCann	vs.	Ji Yeon Kim	Paddy Pimblett	Tom Aspinall	$50,000	
575	UFC on ESPN: Barboza vs. Chikadze	Aug 28, 2021	UFC Apex	Las Vegas, Nevada	United States	N/A		—N/a			Giga Chikadze	Gerald Meerschaert	$50,000	
575	UFC on ESPN: Barboza vs. Chikadze	Aug 28, 2021	UFC Apex	Las Vegas, Nevada	United States	N/A		—N/a			Abdul Razak Alhassan	Pat Sabatini	$50,000	
574	UFC on ESPN: Cannonier vs. Gastelum	Aug 21, 2021	UFC Apex	Las Vegas, Nevada	United States	N/A		—N/a			William Knight	Alexandre Pantoja	$50,000	
574	UFC on ESPN: Cannonier vs. Gastelum	Aug 21, 2021	UFC Apex	Las Vegas, Nevada	United States	N/A		—N/a			Ignacio Bahamondes	Josiane Nunes	$50,000	
573	UFC 265: Lewis vs. Gane	Aug 7, 2021	Toyota Center	Houston, Texas	United States	16,604		Rafael Fiziev	vs.	Bobby Green	Ciryl Gane	Vicente Luque	$50,000	
573	UFC 265: Lewis vs. Gane	Aug 7, 2021	Toyota Center	Houston, Texas	United States	16,604		Rafael Fiziev	vs.	Bobby Green	Jessica Penne	Miles Johns	$50,000	
572	UFC on ESPN: Hall vs. Strickland	July 31, 2021	UFC Apex	Las Vegas, Nevada	United States	—N/a		Jason Witt	vs.	Bryan Barberena	Cheyanne Vlismas	Melsik Baghdasaryan	$50,000	
571	UFC on ESPN: Sandhagen vs. Dillashaw	July 24, 2021	UFC Apex	Las Vegas, Nevada	United States	15		Raulian Paiva	vs.	Kyler Phillips	Adrian Yanez	Darren Elkins	$50,000	
570	UFC on ESPN: Makhachev vs. Moisés	July 17, 2021	UFC Apex	Las Vegas, Nevada	United States	0		Billy Quarantillo	vs.	Gabriel Benítez	Rodrigo Nascimento	Rodolfo Vieira	$50,000	
570	UFC on ESPN: Makhachev vs. Moisés	July 17, 2021	UFC Apex	Las Vegas, Nevada	United States	0		Billy Quarantillo	vs.	Gabriel Benítez	Mateusz Gamrot	Miesha Tate	$50,000	
569	UFC 264: Poirier vs. McGregor 3	July 10, 2021	T-Mobile Arena	Las Vegas, Nevada	United States	20,062		Sean O'Malley	vs.	Kris Moutinho	Tai Tuivasa	Dricus du Plessis	$75,000	
568	UFC Fight Night: Gane vs. Volkov	June 26, 2021	UFC Apex	Las Vegas, Nevada	United States	0		Raoni Barcelos	vs.	Timur Valiev	Marcin Prachnio	Kennedy Nzechukwu	$50,000	
567	UFC on ESPN: The Korean Zombie vs. Ige	June 19, 2021	UFC Apex	Las Vegas, Nevada	United States	0		Marlon Vera	vs.	Davey Grant	Matt Brown	Seung Woo Choi	$50,000	
566	UFC 263: Adesanya vs. Vettori 2	June 12, 2021	Gila River Arena	Glendale, Arizona	United States	17,208		Brad Riddell	vs.	Drew Dober	Brandon Moreno	Paul Craig	$50,000	
565	UFC Fight Night: Rozenstruik vs. Sakai	June 5, 2021	UFC Apex	Las Vegas, Nevada	United States	0		Santiago Ponzinibbio	vs.	Miguel Baeza	Jairzinho Rozenstruik	Marcin Tybura	$50,000	
564	UFC Fight Night: Font vs. Garbrandt	May 22, 2021	UFC Apex	Las Vegas, Nevada	United States	0		Justin Tafa	vs.	Jared Vanderaa	Carla Esparza	Bruno Gustavo da Silva	$50,000	
563	UFC 262: Oliveira vs. Chandler	May 15, 2021	Toyota Center	Houston, Texas	United States	16,005		Edson Barboza	vs.	Shane Burgos	Charles Oliveira	Christos Giagos	$75,000	
562	UFC on ESPN: Rodriguez vs. Waterson	May 8, 2021	UFC Apex	Las Vegas, Nevada	United States	0		Gregor Gillespie	vs.	Carlos Diego Ferreira	Alex Morono	Carlston Harris	$50,000 (Ferreira missed weight; thus he was ineligible to receive the $50,000 bonus and his bonus went to Gillespie instead.)	
561	UFC on ESPN: Reyes vs. Procházka	May 1, 2021	UFC Apex	Las Vegas, Nevada	United States	0		Jiří Procházka	vs.	Dominick Reyes	Jiří Procházka	Giga Chikadze	$50,000	
560	UFC 261: Usman vs. Masvidal 2	Apr 24, 2021	VyStar Veterans Memorial Arena	Jacksonville, Florida	United States	15,269		Jeff Molina	vs.	Aori Qileng	Kamaru Usman	Rose Namajunas	$50,000	
559	UFC on ESPN: Whittaker vs. Gastelum	Apr 17, 2021	UFC Apex	Las Vegas, Nevada	United States	0		Robert Whittaker	vs.	Kelvin Gastelum	Gerald Meerschaert	Tony Gravely	$50,000	
558	UFC on ABC: Vettori vs. Holland	Apr 10, 2021	UFC Apex	Las Vegas, Nevada	United States	0		Julian Marquez	vs.	Sam Alvey	Mackenzie Dern	Mateusz Gamrot	$50,000	
557	UFC 260: Miocic vs. Ngannou 2	Mar 27, 2021	UFC Apex	Las Vegas, Nevada	United States	0		Tyron Woodley	vs.	Vicente Luque	Francis Ngannou	Sean O'Malley	$50,000	
556	UFC on ESPN: Brunson vs. Holland	Mar 20, 2021	UFC Apex	Las Vegas, Nevada	United States	0		—N/a			Max Griffin	Grant Dawson	$50,000	
556	UFC on ESPN: Brunson vs. Holland	Mar 20, 2021	UFC Apex	Las Vegas, Nevada	United States	0		—N/a			Bruno Gustavo da Silva	Adrian Yanez	$50,000	
555	UFC Fight Night: Edwards vs. Muhammad	Mar 13, 2021	UFC Apex	Las Vegas, Nevada	United States	0		—N/a			Dan Ige	Ryan Spann	$50,000	
555	UFC Fight Night: Edwards vs. Muhammad	Mar 13, 2021	UFC Apex	Las Vegas, Nevada	United States	0		—N/a			Davey Grant	Matthew Semelsberger	$50,000	
554	UFC 259: Błachowicz vs. Adesanya	Mar 6, 2021	UFC Apex	Las Vegas, Nevada	United States	0		Kennedy Nzechukwu	vs.	Carlos Ulberg	Uroš Medić	Kai Kara-France	$50,000	
553	UFC Fight Night: Rozenstruik vs. Gane	Feb 27, 2021	UFC Apex	Las Vegas, Nevada	United States	0		Pedro Munhoz	vs.	Jimmie Rivera	Ronnie Lawrence	N/A	$50,000	.
552	UFC Fight Night: Blaydes vs. Lewis	Feb 20, 2021	UFC Apex	Las Vegas, Nevada	United States	0		—N/a			Derrick Lewis	Chris Daukaus	$50,000	
552	UFC Fight Night: Blaydes vs. Lewis	Feb 20, 2021	UFC Apex	Las Vegas, Nevada	United States	0		—N/a			Tom Aspinall	Aiemann Zahabi	$50,000	
551	UFC 258: Usman vs. Burns	Feb 13, 2021	UFC Apex	Las Vegas, Nevada	United States	0		—N/a			Kamaru Usman	Julian Marquez	$50,000	
551	UFC 258: Usman vs. Burns	Feb 13, 2021	UFC Apex	Las Vegas, Nevada	United States	0		—N/a			Polyana Viana	Anthony Hernandez	$50,000	
550	UFC Fight Night: Overeem vs. Volkov	Feb 6, 2021	UFC Apex	Las Vegas, Nevada	United States	0		Beneil Dariush	vs.	Carlos Diego Ferreira	Alexander Volkov	Cory Sandhagen	$50,000	
549	UFC 257: Poirier vs. McGregor 2	Jan 24, 2021	Etihad Arena	Abu Dhabi	United Arab Emirates	2,600		—N/a			Dustin Poirier	Michael Chandler	$50,000	
549	UFC 257: Poirier vs. McGregor 2	Jan 24, 2021	Etihad Arena	Abu Dhabi	United Arab Emirates	2,600		—N/a			Makhmud Muradov	Marina Rodriguez	$50,000	
548	UFC on ESPN: Chiesa vs. Magny	Jan 20, 2021	Etihad Arena	Abu Dhabi	United Arab Emirates	2,000		Mike Davis	vs.	Mason Jones	Umar Nurmagomedov	Warlley Alves	$50,000	
547	UFC on ABC: Holloway vs. Kattar	Jan 16, 2021	Etihad Arena	Abu Dhabi	United Arab Emirates	2,000		Max Holloway	vs.	Calvin Kattar	Alessio Di Chirico	Li Jingliang	$50,000	

== See also ==
- List of UFC champions
- List of UFC events
- List of current UFC fighters
