= Rodolfo Filemon =

Brazilian footballer

Personal information
- Full name: Rodolfo Filemon Oliveira da Silva
- Date of birth: 29 August 1994 (age 32)
- Place of birth: São Simão, Brazil
- Height: 1.84 m (6 ft 0 in)
- Position: Centre-back

Team information
- Current team: Noroeste
- Number: 30

Youth career
- São Carlos

Senior career*
Years	Team	Apps	(Gls)
2014–2016	Juventus-SP	22	(0)
2015	→ Grêmio Prudente (loan)	9	(0)
2016	→ Grêmio Prudente (loan)	5	(0)
2017	URT	13	(0)
2017–2018	Santos	0	(0)
2017	→ URT (loan)	15	(0)
2018	Confiança	9	(2)
2019	Paraná	43	(3)
2020	Coritiba	20	(1)
2020–2021	CSA	19	(2)
2021	→ Operário Ferroviário (loan)	16	(0)
2021	Operário Ferroviário	18	(0)
2022	Inter de Limeira	13	(0)
2022	Novorizontino	21	(0)
2023	Santo André	11	(0)
2023	Paysandu	14	(0)
2024	Portuguesa-RJ	7	(0)
2024	FC Cascavel	11	(0)
2025–	Noroeste	10	(0)
- * Club domestic league appearances and goals as of 17:34, 20 February 2025 (UTC)

Rodolfo Filemon de Oliveira da Silva (born 29 August 1994), known as Rodolfo Filemon or simply Rodolfo, is a Brazilian footballer who plays as a centre-back for Noroeste.

== Club career ==
Born in São Simão, São Paulo, Rodolfo joined Juventus from São Carlos in 2014. He made his senior debut on 19 July of that year, starting in a 0–0 Copa Paulista away draw against Santo André.

In December 2016, after two short loan stints at Grêmio Prudente, Rodolfo was presented at URT, making his senior debut the following 29 January by starting in a 1–0 Campeonato Mineiro home win against Caldense. After featuring in all matches of the tournament, he signed for Santos on 25 May, being initially assigned to the B-team.

On 9 January 2018, Rodolfo returned to his former side URT on loan. On 24 May, he joined Confiança on a permanent contract, after his deal with Santos expired.

In January 2019, Rodolfo joined Série B side Paraná. On 7 January of the following year, after being a regular starter for the club, he agreed to a three-year deal with Coritiba, newly-promoted to the Série A.

== Career statistics ==
As of 20 February 2025

Club	Season	League			State League		Cup		Continental		Other		Total	
Club	Season	Division	Apps	Goals	Apps	Goals	Apps	Goals	Apps	Goals	Apps	Goals	Apps	Goals
Juventus-SP	2014	Paulista A3	—		0	0	—		—		13 (Note: Appearance(s) in Copa Paulista)	0	13	0
Juventus-SP	2015	Paulista A3	—		12	0	—		—		—		12	0
Juventus-SP	2016	Paulista A2	—		10	0	—		—		—		10	0
Juventus-SP	Total		—		22	0	—		—		13	0	35	0
Grêmio Prudente (loan)	2015	Paulista 2ª Divisão	—		9	0	—		—		—		9	0
Grêmio Prudente (loan)	2016	Paulista 2ª Divisão	—		5	0	—		—		—		5	0
URT	2017	Série D	0	0	13	0	1	0	—		—		14	0
Santos	2017	Série A	0	0	—		—		—		18	2	18	2
URT (loan)	2018	Série D	5	0	10	0	1	0	—		—		16	0
Confiança	2018	Série C	9	2	—		—		—		—		9	2
Paraná	2019	Série B	34	1	9	2	2	0	—		—		45	3
Coritiba	2020	Série A	14	0	6	1	0	0	—		—		20	1
CSA	2020	Série B	9	1	—		—		—		—		9	1
CSA	2021	Série B	0	0	3	0	1	0	—		6 (Note: Appearance(s) in Copa do Nordeste)	1	10	1
CSA	Total		9	1	3	0	1	0	—		6	1	19	2
Operário Ferroviário	2021	Série B	25	0	9	0	—		—		—		34	0
Inter de Limeira	2022	Série D	0	0	13	0	—		—		—		13	0
Novorizontino	2022	Série B	21	0	—		—		—		—		21	0
Santo André	2023	Série D	0	0	11	0	—		—		—		11	0
Paysandu	2023	Série C	8	0	6	0	2	0	—		—		16	0
Portuguesa-RJ	2024	Série D	0	0	7	0	2	0	—		—		9	0
FC Cascavel	2024	Série D	11	0	—		—		—		—		11	0
Noroeste	2025	Paulista	—		10	0	—		—		—		10	0
Career total			136	4	133	3	9	0	0	0	37	3	314	10
