= Mariana Morais =

Brazilian mixed martial arts fighter

- Born: May 3, 1995 (age 31); São João da Boa Vista, Brazil
- Other names: The Razor
- Height: 5 ft 4 in (1.63 m)
- Weight: 155 lb (70 kg; 11 st 1 lb)
- Division: Lightweight; Featherweight
- Reach: 66.0 in (168 cm)
- Fighting out of: Niterói, Brazil
- Team: Paraná Vale Tudo
- Years active: 2012–present

Mixed martial arts record
- Total: 30
- Wins: 18
- By knockout: 4
- By submission: 9
- By decision: 5
- Losses: 12
- By knockout: 2
- By submission: 4
- By decision: 6

Other information
- Mixed martial arts record from Sherdog

Mariana Morais (born May 3, 1995) is a Brazilian female mixed martial artist who competes in the Bantamweight division. From April 2020 to October 2020, Fight Matrix had Morais ranked within the top 10 of the rankings for Women's Featherweight+, rising to as high as #9.

== Mixed martial arts career ==
=== Early career ===
Starting her career in 2012, Morais compiled a 9–2 record on the regional Brazilian scene before she was signed to Invicta Fighting Championships as a 19 year old.

In her one fight at the time in the promotion, Morais faced Roxanne Modafferi at Invicta FC 14: Evinger vs. Kianzad on September 12, 2015, and lost via TKO stoppage in the third round.

Returning to the regional Brazilian scene, Morais won 3 out the next 4 bouts, losing only to future UFC fighter Karol Rosa via unanimous decision.

Morais faced Ariane Lipski on October 22, 2017, at KSW 40 for the KSW Women's Flyweight Championship. She lost via rear-naked choke less than a minute into the first round.

Morais faced Vanessa Porto on January 13, 2018, at Invicta FC 27: Kaufman vs. Kianzad. She lost the fight via a rear-naked choke on round one.

Morais would then lose the next 4 out of 6 bouts on the regional Brazilian scene, including for the Shooto Brazil Women's Bantamweight Championship at Shooto Brasil 81 against Lara Fritzen via unanimous decision. One of the bouts she did win was for the NCE Flyweight Championship.

Morais competed in the one night Shooto Brasil Women's Lightweight Grand Prix on March 1, 2020, with the winner gaining a contract for the 2021 Professional Fighters League season. Morais started the event by facing Dayana Silva, from Nova União. In a tough fight, she won by split decision. She qualified for the final, where she faced Bianca Daimoni, from Chute Boxe, who had beaten Yana Gadelha in the semifinal. The São Paulo fighter needed less than two minutes to knock out Daimoni, in a straightforward exchange of blows.

=== Professional Fighters League ===
Morais was announced to be participating in the PFL for the 2021 season, and faced Kayla Harrison on May 6, 2021, at PFL 3. She lost the bout via TKO in the first round.

Morais faced Kaitlin Young on June 25, 2021, at PFL 6. She won the close bout via split decision.

Although she was eliminated from championship contention, she was scheduled to face Zamzagul Fayzallanova on August 19, 2021, at PFL 8. However, Zamzagul has to pull out of the bout and she was replaced by Claudia Zamora. After Larissa Pacheco was removed the tournament due to weight cut issues, Morais, who finished fifth in final standings, was reinstated as a replacement to face Taylor Guardado in the Semifinals off the Women's Lightweight tournament on August 19, 2021, at PFL 8. She lost the back-and-forth bout via split decision.

=== Post PFL ===
In her first bout after leaving PFL, Morais faced Abril Anguiano on January 7, 2023, at Peak Fighting 25, winning the bout via rear-naked choke in the first round.

== Championships and accomplishments ==
=== Mixed martial arts ===
- New Corpore Extreme
  - NCE Flyweight Championship

== Mixed martial arts record ==
Professional record breakdown
| 30 matches | 18 wins | 12 losses |
| By knockout | 4 | 2 |
| By submission | 9 | 4 |
| By decision | 5 | 6 |

| Res. | Record | Opponent | Method | Event | Date | Round | Time | Location | Notes |
|---|---|---|---|---|---|---|---|---|---|
| Win | 18–12 | Abril Anguiano | Submission (rear-naked choke) | Peak Fighting 25 | January 7, 2023 | 1 | 3:19 | Hinton, Oklahoma, United States | Return to Bantamweight. |
| Loss | 17–12 | Taylor Guardado | Decision (split) | PFL 8 (2021) | August 19, 2021 | 3 | 5:00 | Hollywood, Florida, United States | 2021 PFL Women's Lightweight Tournament Semifinal. |
| Win | 17–11 | Kaitlin Young | Decision (split) | PFL 6 (2021) | June 25, 2021 | 3 | 5:00 | Atlantic City, New Jersey, United States | |
| Loss | 16–11 | Kayla Harrison | TKO (punches) | PFL 3 (2021) | May 6, 2021 | 1 | 1:23 | Atlantic City, New Jersey, United States | |
| Win | 16–10 | Bianca Daimoni | KO (punches) | Shooto Brasil: Grand Prix | March 1, 2020 | 1 | 1:19 | Rio de Janeiro, Brazil | |
| Win | 15–10 | Dayana Silva | Decision (split) | Shooto Brasil: Grand Prix | March 1, 2020 | 3 | 5:00 | Rio de Janeiro, Brazil | Lightweight debut. |
| Win | 14–10 | Sidy Rocha | Decision (unanimous) | Shooto Brazil 99 | December 20, 2019 | 3 | 5:00 | Rio de Janeiro, Brazil | |
| Loss | 13–10 | Vanessa Melo | Decision (split) | Future FC 5 | May 24, 2019 | 3 | 5:00 | São Paulo, Brazil | |
| Loss | 13–9 | Norma Dumont | Decision (majority) | Shooto Brazil 86 | August 5, 2018 | 3 | 5:00 | Rio de Janeiro, Brazil | Return to Bantamweight. |
| Loss | 13–8 | Daiane Firmino | Submission (arm-triangle choke) | Standout Fighting Tournament 3 | July 21, 2018 | 3 | 1:04 | São Paulo, Brazil | |
| Win | 13–7 | Núbia Nascimento | Decision (unanimous) | New Corpore Extreme 26 | May 5, 2018 | 3 | 5:00 | Rio de Janeiro, Brazil | Won the vacant NCE Flyweight Championship. Return to Flyweight. |
| Loss | 12–7 | Lara Fritzen | Decision (unanimous) | Shooto Brasil 81 | March 17, 2018 | 3 | 5:00 | Rio de Janeiro, Brazil | For the vacant Shooto Brazil Women's Bantamweight Championship. Return to Bantamweight. |
| Loss | 12–6 | Vanessa Porto | Submission (rear-naked choke) | Invicta FC 27: Kaufman vs. Kianzad | January 13, 2018 | 1 | 4:19 | Kansas City, Missouri, United States | |
| Loss | 12–5 | Ariane Lipski | Submission (rear-naked choke) | KSW 40 | October 22, 2017 | 1 | 0:58 | Dublin, Ireland | For the KSW Women's Flyweight Championship. Return to Flyweight. |
| Win | 12–4 | Vitória Ferreira | TKO (punches) | Curitiba Top Fight 11 | July 1, 2017 | 2 | 4:15 | Curitiba, Brazil | |
| Win | 11–4 | Jéssica Suelem | Submission (rear-naked choke) | Curitiba Top Fight 10 | February 24, 2017 | 1 | 1:03 | Curitiba, Brazil | |
| Loss | 10–4 | Karol Rosa | Decision (unanimous) | HCC The Start 4 | December 17, 2016 | 3 | 5:00 | Vila Velha, Brazil | |
| Win | 10–3 | Laisa Coimbra | Submission (arm-triangle choke) | Floripa Fight Girls | October 15, 2016 | 1 | 1:23 | Florianópolis, Brazil | Return to Bantamweight. |
| Loss | 9–3 | Roxanne Modafferi | TKO (punches) | Invicta FC 14: Evinger vs. Kianzad | September 12, 2015 | 3 | 4:40 | Kansas City, Missouri, United States | |
| Win | 9–2 | Marta Souza | Submission (armbar) | MMA Leones: Clevinho vs. Fiel | December 20, 2014 | 2 | 2:04 | Fazenda Rio Grande, Brazil | |
| Win | 8–2 | Cristina Mejia | Decision (unanimous) | Peru FC 19 | December 3, 2014 | 3 | 5:00 | Lima, Peru | |
| Win | 7–2 | Stephanie Bragayrac | Submission (arm-triangle choke) | Explosion MMA 4 | November 15, 2014 | 2 | N/A | Curitiba, Brazil | |
| Win | 6–2 | Geisyele Nascimento | Submission (armbar) | Striker's House Cup 43 | October 25, 2014 | 1 | 2:12 | Curitiba, Brazil | |
| Win | 5–2 | Gisele Cardoso | Submission (rear-naked choke) | Sao Jose Top Fight 1 | September 21, 2014 | 1 | 0:52 | São José dos Pinhais, Brazil | |
| Loss | 4–2 | Luciana Pereira | Decision (unanimous) | Shooto Brasil 49 | August 24, 2014 | 3 | 5:00 | Rio de Janeiro, Brazil | Bantamweight bout. |
| Loss | 4–1 | Jennifer Maia | Submission (rear-naked choke) | Circuito Talent de MMA 9 | May 10, 2014 | 2 | 2:18 | São José dos Pinhais, Brazil | |
| Win | 4–0 | Mariana Leonardo | Submission (straight armbar) | Circuito Talent de MMA 8 | April 12, 2014 | 1 | 0:44 | Valinhos, Brazil | |
| Win | 3–0 | Margarete Soares | Submission (guillotine choke) | Pocos Fight MMA 2 | August 24, 2013 | 1 | 3:54 | Poços de Caldas, Brazil | |
| Win | 2–0 | Bruna Godoy | TKO (punches) | Explosive MMA Fighter 4 | May 18, 2013 | 1 | 0:40 | São Simão, Brazil | |
| Win | 1–0 | Juliana Cristina | TKO (punches) | Explosive MMA Fighter | May 26, 2012 | 1 | 1:40 | São Simão, Brazil | Flyweight debut. |

== See also ==
- List of female mixed martial artists
