= Karol Rosa =

Brazilian mixed martial artist

- Born: Karol Rosa Cavedo; December 30, 1994 (age 31); Vila Velha, Espírito Santo, Brazil
- Height: 5 ft 7 in (170 cm)
- Weight: 145 lb (66 kg; 10 st 5 lb)
- Division: Bantamweight (2012–present); Featherweight (2012, 2017–2018, 2023)
- Reach: 67 in (170 cm)
- Fighting out of: Vila Velha, Brazil
- Team: Vitória Combat Club (until 2017); Paraná Vale Tudo (2017–2024)
- Rank: Black belt in Brazilian Jiu-Jitsu under Gilliard Paraná; Dark blue belt in Muay Thai
- Years active: 2012–present

Mixed martial arts record
- Total: 27
- Wins: 19
- By knockout: 4
- By submission: 2
- By decision: 13
- Losses: 8
- By submission: 2
- By decision: 6

Other information
- Mixed martial arts record from Sherdog

Karol Rosa Cavedo (born December 30, 1994) is a Brazilian mixed martial artist. A professional since 2012, she currently competes in the women's Bantamweight division of the Ultimate Fighting Championship (UFC). As of June 20, 2026, she is #10 in the Meta UFC women's bantamweight rankings.

== Background ==
Rosa started training Brazilian Jiu-Jitsu at the age of 13, winning multiple international competitions in the sport before transitioning to mixed martial arts at the age of 17.

== Mixed martial arts career ==
=== Early career ===
Starting her career in 2012, Rosa compiled a 11–3 record fighting for a wide variety of regional Brazilian promotions, most notably fighting for the Watch Out Combat Show Featherweight Championship against two-time Professional Fighters League champion Larissa Pacheco, which Rosa lost by guillotine choke.

=== Ultimate Fighting Championship ===
Rosa made her UFC debut against Lara Procópio at UFC Fight Night: Andrade vs. Zhang on August 31, 2019. She won a close back and forth fight by split decision.

Rosa was expected to face Julia Avila on October 26, 2019, at UFC Fight Night: Maia vs. Askren. The fight was later cancelled due to a knee injury from Rosa. The match was rescheduled to April 11, 2020, at UFC Fight Night: Overeem vs. Harris. Due to the COVID-19 pandemic, the event was eventually postponed. The pair was rescheduled to meet on May 2, 2020, at UFC Fight Night 174. However, on April 9, Dana White, the president of UFC announced that the event too was postponed to June 13, 2020. Eventually, Rosa withdrew from the bout and was replaced by Gina Mazany.

Rosa faced Vanessa Melo at UFC 251 on July 11, 2020. Melo weighed in at 141 pounds, five pounds over the bantamweight non-title fight limit and was fined 30 percent of her purse which went to Rosa. Rosa won the fight via unanimous decision.

Rosa was expected to replace Macy Chiasson against Sijara Eubanks at UFC Fight Night: Overeem vs. Sakai on September 5, 2020. Rosa pulled out on September 3 due to complications related to her weight cut.

Rosa was scheduled to face Nicco Montaño on February 6, 2021, at UFC Fight Night: Overeem vs. Volkov. However, in the weeks leading up the fight, Montaño was pulled from the event due to undisclosed reasons and replaced by Joselyne Edwards. Rosa won the fight via unanimous decision.

Rosa was scheduled to face Sijara Eubanks on June 12, 2021, at UFC 263. However, Rosa pulled out of the fight in late-May citing an injury. In turn, Eubanks was removed from the card and will face Priscila Cachoeira six weeks later at UFC Fight Night 192 instead.

Rosa faced Bethe Correia on October 2, 2021, at UFC Fight Night 193. At the weigh-ins, Correia weighed in at 138.5 pounds, two and a half pounds over the women's bantamweight non-title fight limit. The bout proceeded at catchweight and Correia was fined 20% which went to Rosa. She won the fight via unanimous decision.

Rosa faced Sara McMann on March 26, 2022, at UFC on ESPN 33. She lost the fight by unanimous decision.

Rosa faced Lina Länsberg at UFC 280 in Abu Dhabi on October 22, 2022. She won the bout via majority decision.

=== Move up to featherweight ===
Rosa faced Norma Dumont on April 22, 2023, at UFC Fight Night 222. She lost the fight via unanimous decision.

Rosa, replacing Macy Chiasson, faced Yana Santos on July 1, 2023, at UFC on ESPN 48. She won the fight via split decision.

=== Return to bantamweight ===
Rosa faced Irene Aldana on December 16, 2023, at UFC 296. She lost the bout via unanimous decision. This fight earned them the Fight of the Night award. The two women set a single-fight women's bantamweight record for 349 significant strikes. Rosa also broke the record for most leg kicks landed in a single UFC bout with 95. The previous record was 76.

Rosa faced Pannie Kianzad on August 10, 2024, at UFC on ESPN 61. She won the fight via unanimous decision.

Rosa faced Ailín Pérez on January 18, 2025, at UFC 311. She lost the fight by unanimous decision.

Rosa faced Nora Cornolle on August 2, 2025 at UFC Fight Night 257. She won the fight by unanimous decision.

Rosa faced Luana Santos on June 20, 2026 at UFC Fight Night 279. She lost the fight by unanimous decision.

== Professional grappling career ==
Rosa faced Raquel Pa'aluhi at UFC Fight Pass Invitational 6 on March 3, 2024. She lost the match by submission.

== Championships and accomplishments ==
=== Mixed martial arts ===
- Ultimate Fighting Championship
  - Fight of the Night (One time) vs. Irene Aldana
  - Most leg kicks landed in a single UFC bout (95) vs. Irene Aldana
  - Tied (Yana Santos) for third most wins in UFC Women's Bantamweight division history (7)
  - Third most significant strikes landed in UFC Women's Bantamweight division history (960)
  - Fourth highest significant strike accuracy in UFC Women's Bantamweight division history (56.7%)
  - Second most significant strikes landed-per-minute in UFC Women's Bantamweight division history (6.4)
  - Third highest striking differential in UFC Women's Bantamweight division history (1.76)
  - Second most total strikes landed in UFC Women's Bantamweight division history (1540)
  - UFC.com Awards
    - 2023: Ranked #3 Fight of the Year vs. Irene Aldana
- Bleacher Report
  - 2023 #5 Ranked UFC Fight of the Year vs. Irene Aldana at UFC 296

== Mixed martial arts record ==
Professional record breakdown
27 matches	19 wins	8 losses
By knockout	4	0
By submission	2	2
By decision	13	6

Res.	Record	Opponent	Method	Event	Date	Round	Time	Location	Notes
Loss	19–8	Luana Santos	Decision (unanimous)	UFC Fight Night: Kape vs. Horiguchi	June 20, 2026	3	5:00	Las Vegas, Nevada, United States	
Win	19–7	Nora Cornolle	Decision (unanimous)	UFC on ESPN: Taira vs. Park	August 2, 2025	3	5:00	Las Vegas, Nevada, United States	
Loss	18–7	Ailín Pérez	Decision (unanimous)	UFC 311	January 18, 2025	3	5:00	Inglewood, California, United States	
Win	18–6	Pannie Kianzad	Decision (unanimous)	UFC on ESPN: Tybura vs. Spivac 2	August 10, 2024	3	5:00	Las Vegas, Nevada, United States	
Loss	17–6	Irene Aldana	Decision (unanimous)	UFC 296	December 16, 2023	3	5:00	Las Vegas, Nevada, United States	Return to Bantamweight. Fight of the Night.
Win	17–5	Yana Santos	Decision (split)	UFC on ESPN: Strickland vs. Magomedov	July 1, 2023	3	5:00	Las Vegas, Nevada, United States	
Loss	16–5	Norma Dumont	Decision (unanimous)	UFC Fight Night: Pavlovich vs. Blaydes	April 22, 2023	3	5:00	Las Vegas, Nevada, United States	Return to Featherweight.
Win	16–4	Lina Länsberg	Decision (majority)	UFC 280	October 22, 2022	3	5:00	Abu Dhabi, United Arab Emirates	Rosa was deducted 1 point in round 2 due to an illegal knee.
Loss	15–4	Sara McMann	Decision (unanimous)	UFC on ESPN: Blaydes vs. Daukaus	March 26, 2022	3	5:00	Columbus, Ohio, United States	
Win	15–3	Bethe Correia	Decision (unanimous)	UFC Fight Night: Santos vs. Walker	October 2, 2021	3	5:00	Las Vegas, Nevada, United States	Catchweight (138.5 lb) bout; Correia missed weight.
Win	14–3	Joselyne Edwards	Decision (unanimous)	UFC Fight Night: Overeem vs. Volkov	February 6, 2021	3	5:00	Las Vegas, Nevada, United States	
Win	13–3	Vanessa Melo	Decision (unanimous)	UFC 251	July 11, 2020	3	5:00	Abu Dhabi, United Arab Emirates	Catchweight (141 lb) bout; Melo missed weight.
Win	12–3	Lara Procópio	Decision (split)	UFC Fight Night: Andrade vs. Zhang	August 31, 2019	3	5:00	Shenzhen, China	
Win	11–3	Gisele Moreira	TKO (punches)	Future FC 4	April 19, 2019	3	4:21	São Paulo, Brazil	
Win	10–3	Tamires Vidal	Submission (arm-triangle choke)	MMA Brutus 1	March 24, 2019	3	1:40	Rio de Janeiro, Brazil	
Loss	9–3	Melissa Gatto	Submission (kimura)	Nação Cyborg 3	September 29, 2018	1	4:19	Curitiba, Brazil	Return to Bantamweight.
Win	9–2	Tamara Leorde	TKO (retirement)	Favela Kombat 29	June 16, 2018	3	2:18	Rio de Janeiro, Brazil	
Loss	8–2	Larissa Pacheco	Submission (guillotine choke)	Watch Out Combat Show 49	March 24, 2018	2	2:59	Rio de Janeiro, Brazil	For the vacant WOCS Featherweight Championship.
Win	8–1	Nayara Rodrigues	TKO (corner stoppage)	Buzios Fight Night	August 26, 2017	2	5:00	Armação dos Búzios, Brazil	Bantamweight bout.
Win	7–1	Diana Morais	Submission (armbar)	New Corpore Extreme 16	July 15, 2017	2	4:30	Rio Bonito, Brazil	Featherweight debut.
Win	6–1	Sidy Rocha	Decision (unanimous)	Curitiba Top Fight 11	July 1, 2017	3	5:00	Curitiba, Brazil	Catchweight (141 lb) bout.
Loss	5–1	Gisele Moreira	Decision (majority)	Aspera FC 50	March 18, 2017	3	5:00	São José do Calçado, Brazil	
Win	5–0	Mariana Morais	Decision (unanimous)	The Start Combat 4	December 17, 2016	3	5:00	Vila Velha, Brazil	
Win	4–0	Jéssica Andrade	Decision (unanimous)	Capixaba Fight	September 13, 2014	3	5:00	Guarapari, Brazil	
Win	3–0	Mylena Duarte	TKO (punches and knees)	Haidar Capixaba Combat 13	September 7, 2013	1	0:39	Vila Velha, Brazil	
Win	2–0	Tatiane Aguiar	Decision (unanimous)	Haidar Capixaba Combat 11	September 15, 2012	3	5:00	Vitória, Brazil	
Win	1–0	Thiara Borgth	Decision (unanimous)	Haidar Capixaba Combat 9	March 16, 2012	3	5:00	Vitória, Brazil	Bantamweight debut.

== See also ==
- List of current UFC fighters
- List of female mixed martial artists
