= UFC on ESPN: The Korean Zombie vs. Ige =

UFC mixed martial arts event in 2021

- The poster for UFC on ESPN: The Korean Zombie vs. Ige
- Promotion: Ultimate Fighting Championship
- Date: June 19, 2021
- Venue: UFC Apex
- City: Enterprise, Nevada, United States
- Attendance: None (behind closed doors)

Event chronology
| UFC 263: Adesanya vs. Vettori 2 | UFC on ESPN: The Korean Zombie vs. Ige | UFC Fight Night: Gane vs. Volkov |

UFC on ESPN: The Korean Zombie vs. Ige (also known as UFC on ESPN 25 and UFC Vegas 29) was a mixed martial arts event produced by the Ultimate Fighting Championship that took place on June 19, 2021 at the UFC Apex facility in Enterprise, Nevada, part of the Las Vegas Metropolitan Area, United States.

== Background ==
A featherweight bout between former UFC Featherweight Championship challenger Chan Sung Jung and Dan Ige served as the event headliner.

A welterweight bout between Tim Means and Danny Roberts was briefly linked to the event. However, Roberts was removed from the pairing by the promotion in the days leading up to the event due to COVID-19 protocols, while Means was rebooked a week later against Nicolas Dalby.

A flyweight bout between Tagir Ulanbekov and Tyson Nam was expected to take place at the event. However, the bout was never officially announced by the promotion and the matchup did not take place on the card due to a recent undisclosed illness for Ulanbekov.

== Results ==
Main card (ESPN2 / ESPN+)
| Weight class | | | | Method | Round | Time | Notes |
|---|---|---|---|---|---|---|---|
| Featherweight | Chan Sung Jung | def. | Dan Ige | Decision (unanimous) (48–47, 49–46, 49–46) | 5 | 5:00 |
| Heavyweight | Serghei Spivac | def. | Aleksei Oleinik | Decision (unanimous) (29–28, 29–28, 29–28) | 3 | 5:00 |
| Bantamweight | Marlon Vera | def. | Davey Grant | Decision (unanimous) (29–27, 29–28, 30–26) | 3 | 5:00 |
| Featherweight | Seung Woo Choi | def. | Julian Erosa | TKO (punches) | 1 | 1:37 |
| Middleweight | Bruno Silva | def. | Wellington Turman | KO (punches) | 1 | 4:45 |
| Welterweight | Matt Brown | def. | Dhiego Lima | KO (punch) | 2 | 3:02 |
Preliminary card
| Light Heavyweight | Nicolae Negumereanu | def. | Aleksa Camur | Decision (split) (29–28, 28–29, 29–28) | 3 | 5:00 |
| Women's Strawweight | Virna Jandiroba | def. | Kanako Murata | TKO (arm injury) | 2 | 5:00 |
| Welterweight | Khaos Williams | def. | Matthew Semelsberger | Decision (unanimous) (30–27, 29–28, 29–28) | 3 | 5:00 |
| Heavyweight | Josh Parisian | def. | Roque Martinez | Decision (split) (28–29, 29–28, 29–28) | 3 | 5:00 |
| Lightweight | Ricky Glenn | def. | Joaquim Silva | KO (punches) | 1 | 0:37 |
| Women's Flyweight | Casey O'Neill | def. | Lara Procópio | Technical Submission (rear-naked choke) | 3 | 2:54 |

== Bonus awards ==
The following fighters received $50,000 bonuses.

- Fight of the Night: Marlon Vera vs. Davey Grant
- Performance of the Night: Seung Woo Choi and Matt Brown

== See also ==
- List of UFC events
- List of current UFC fighters
- 2021 in UFC
