= UFC 251 =

UFC mixed martial arts event in 2020

UFC 251: Usman vs. Masvidal
- The poster for UFC 251: Usman vs. Masvidal
- Promotion: Ultimate Fighting Championship
- Date: July 12, 2020
- Venue: du Forum
- City: Abu Dhabi, United Arab Emirates
- Attendance: None (behind closed doors)
- Buyrate: 1,300,000

Event chronology
UFC on ESPN: Poirier vs. Hooker	UFC 251: Usman vs. Masvidal	UFC on ESPN: Kattar vs. Ige

UFC 251: Usman vs. Masvidal was a mixed martial arts event produced by the Ultimate Fighting Championship that took place on July 12, 2020 at the du Forum on Yas Island, Abu Dhabi, United Arab Emirates. It was originally planned to take place on June 6 at Perth Arena in Perth, Australia. Due to the COVID-19 pandemic, the event was eventually postponed on April 9 (see section below). In early June, it was confirmed that the event would instead take place in Abu Dhabi.

== Background ==
The event would have marked the promotion's second visit to Perth, following UFC 221 in February 2018. However, the promotion later announced on May 5 that it would officially postpone the realization of this event in Perth due to the COVID-19 pandemic.

While not officially announced by the organization, a UFC Featherweight Championship rematch between current champion Alexander Volkanovski and former champion Max Holloway was originally expected to headline the event on June 6. The pairing first met at UFC 245, where Volkanovski defeated Holloway via unanimous decision to capture the title. Volkanovski indicated in late March that due to the COVID-19 pandemic, he would postpone his title defense on the initial June 6 date.

A UFC Women's Flyweight Championship bout between current champion Valentina Shevchenko and Joanne Calderwood was expected to take place on the event's first date. However, Shevchenko was forced to withdraw from the event on March 31 due to a leg injury and the bout was postponed.

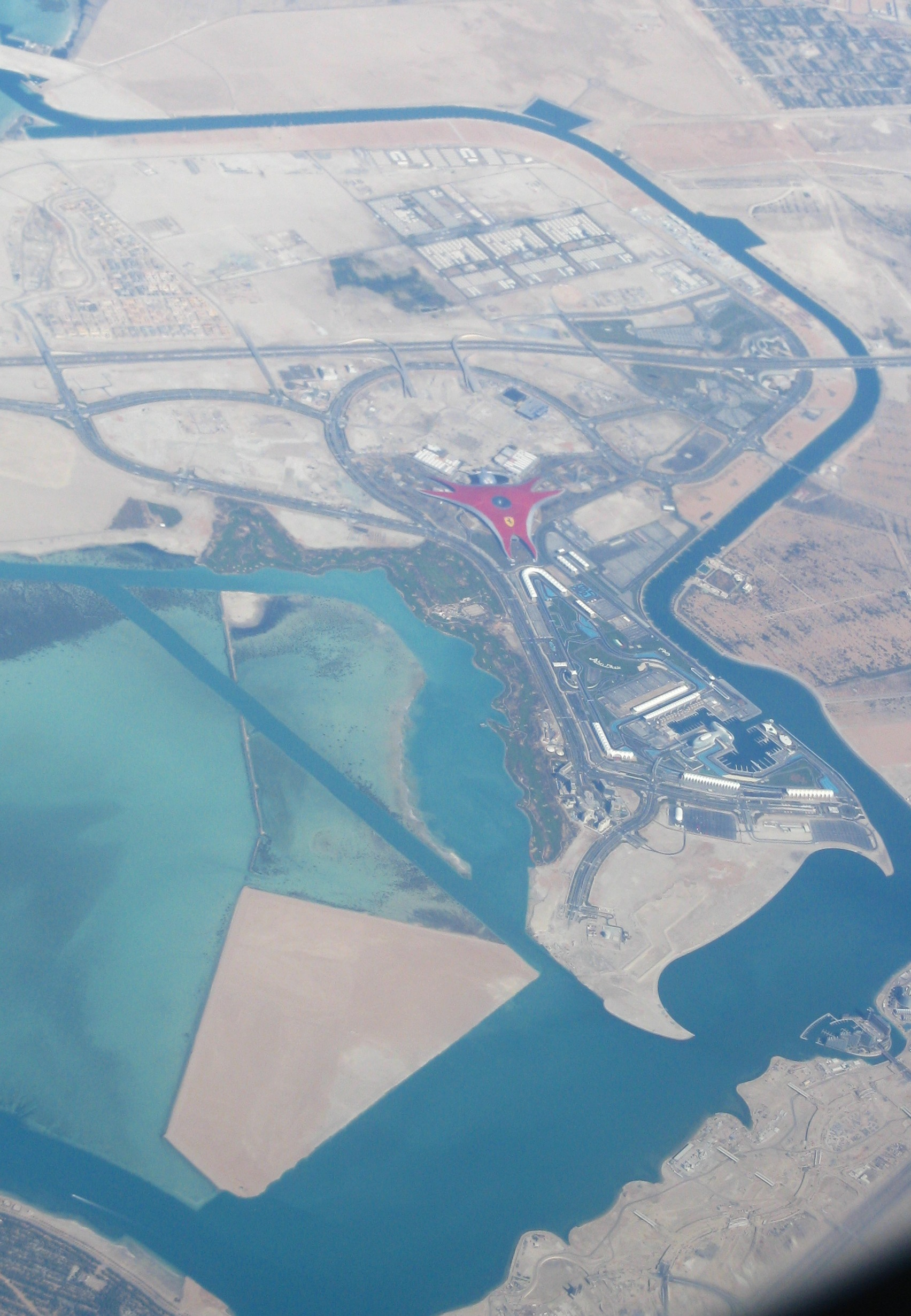
Yas Island was also the site for three previous UFC events in Abu Dhabi. One of them, UFC Fight Night: Nogueira vs. Nelson, was held at du Arena. The other two Yas Island events, UFC 112 and UFC 242, were held at temporary venues.

=== COVID-19 pandemic, relocation to Abu Dhabi ===
UFC president Dana White stated on April 7 that he was pursuing an international venue — described as a "private island" or "Fight Island" — to facilitate the hosting of events involving fighters impacted by U.S. travel restrictions.

On June 9, the UFC revealed that the "Fight Island" site would be Yas Island, Abu Dhabi, United Arab Emirates and that it would also host four events in July. This event was the fourth UFC event held on Yas Island overall, succeeding UFC 242 in September 2019. Additionally, there is a 10 square mile (16 km) "safety zone" on the island restricted to essential personnel. The designated area includes access to amenities such as hotels, restaurants and a training cage on the beach. The fights took place inside the du Forum — an indoor events arena. It does not have communal areas and those entering the site must go through "mist tunnels" to disinfect themselves from surface bacteria.

Without fans in attendance, the promotion did not have to worry about scheduling the event for local primetime hours. The event was instead scheduled for prime time in the U.S. Eastern Time Zone; the full preliminary card began at approximately 2:00 am (July 12) Gulf Standard Time.

A UFC Welterweight Championship bout between current champion Kamaru Usman (also The Ultimate Fighter: American Top Team vs. Blackzilians welterweight winner) and Gilbert Burns was expected to headline the event. However, it was announced on July 3 that Burns was pulled from the contest after he and his coach, Greg Jones, tested positive for COVID-19. Pending pre-fight testing and a 24-hour quarantine, Jorge Masvidal was expected to serve as his replacement. After he passed his initial test, the new main event was confirmed.

The previously mentioned UFC Featherweight Championship rematch between Volkanovski and Holloway co-headlined the event.

A UFC Bantamweight Championship bout for the vacant title between Petr Yan and former WEC and two-time UFC Featherweight Champion José Aldo also took place at the event. Former champion Henry Cejudo announced immediately after his title defense at UFC 249 that he would be relinquishing the title and retiring from the sport.

The following fights were also rescheduled for this event, after being scrapped due to different reasons from their original bookings:

- A women's strawweight rematch between former UFC Women's Strawweight Champions Jéssica Andrade and Rose Namajunas. The pairing previously met at UFC 237 in May 2019, where Andrade won via second-round TKO to capture the title. They were originally expected to co-headline UFC 249. However, Namajunas pulled out for personal reasons, with her manager citing a pair of deaths in the family related to the COVID-19 pandemic as the reason.
- A heavyweight bout between Shamil Abdurakhimov and Ciryl Gane. The pairing was also scheduled for UFC 249, but Gane was forced to pull out of the event after he was struck by a pneumothorax in training. Subsequently, the pairing was cancelled a second time and scrapped from this event in mid-June as Abdurakhimov was removed from the bout for undisclosed reasons. In turn, Gane was rescheduled to fight Sergei Pavlovich at UFC Fight Night: Lewis vs Oleinik.
- A women's strawweight bout between Amanda Ribas and Paige VanZant. They were initially scheduled for UFC Fight Night: Lee vs. Oliveira in March. However, VanZant was forced to pull out of the fight due to an undisclosed injury.

A bantamweight bout between Pedro Munhoz and former UFC Lightweight Champion Frankie Edgar was briefly linked to the event. However, promotion officials elected to schedule the pairing for UFC on ESPN: Kattar vs. Ige four days later.

A heavyweight bout between Marcin Tybura between Alexander Romanov was scheduled for the event. However, Romanov was pulled from the event after testing positive for COVID-19 and replaced by promotional newcomer Maxim Grishin.

At the weigh-ins, Raulian Paiva and Vanessa Melo missed weight for their respective bouts. Paiva weighed in at 129 pounds, three pounds over the flyweight non-title fight limit. Melo weighed in at 141 pounds, five pounds over the bantamweight non-title fight limit. Both of their bouts proceeded at a catchweight and they were each fined 20% and 30% of their individual purses, which went to their opponents Zhalgas Zhumagulov and Karol Rosa.

== Results ==
Main card
Weight class				Method	Round	Time	Notes
Welterweight	Kamaru Usman (c)	def.	Jorge Masvidal	Decision (unanimous) (50–45, 50–45, 49–46)	5	5:00	(Note: For the UFC Welterweight Championship.)
Featherweight	Alexander Volkanovski (c)	def.	Max Holloway	Decision (split) (47–48, 48–47, 48–47)	5	5:00	(Note: For the UFC Featherweight Championship.)
Bantamweight	Petr Yan	def.	José Aldo	TKO (punches)	5	3:24	(Note: For the vacant UFC Bantamweight Championship.)
Women's Strawweight	Rose Namajunas	def.	Jéssica Andrade	Decision (split) (29–28, 28–29, 29–28)	3	5:00
Women's Flyweight	Amanda Ribas	def.	Paige VanZant	Submission (armbar)	1	2:21
Preliminary Card (ESPN / ESPN+)
Light Heavyweight	Jiří Procházka	def.	Volkan Oezdemir	KO (punch)	2	0:49
Welterweight	Muslim Salikhov	def.	Elizeu Zaleski dos Santos	Decision (split) (30–27, 28–29, 29–28)	3	5:00
Featherweight	Makwan Amirkhani	def.	Danny Henry	Technical Submission (anaconda choke)	1	3:15
Lightweight	Leonardo Santos	def.	Roman Bogatov	Decision (unanimous) (29–26, 29–26, 29–26)	3	5:00	(Note: Bogatov was deducted 2 points in round 3 for multiple low blows and an illegal knee.)
Early Preliminary Card (ESPN / ESPN+ / UFC Fight Pass)
Heavyweight	Marcin Tybura	def.	Maxim Grishin	Decision (unanimous) (30–27, 30–27, 30–26)	3	5:00
Catchweight (129 lb)	Raulian Paiva	def.	Zhalgas Zhumagulov	Decision (unanimous) (29–28, 29–28, 29–28)	3	5:00
Catchweight (141 lb)	Karol Rosa	def.	Vanessa Melo	Decision (unanimous) (30–26, 30–26, 30–27)	3	5:00
Bantamweight	Davey Grant	def.	Martin Day	KO (punch)	3	2:38

== Bonus awards ==
The following fighters received $50,000 bonuses.

- Fight of the Night: Rose Namajunas vs. Jéssica Andrade
- Performance of the Night: Jiří Procházka and Davey Grant

== Records set ==
The event had a total fight time of 3 hours, 7 minutes and 27 seconds, surpassing the previous record holder UFC Fight Night: Werdum vs. Tybura. The record was later broken by UFC 263 with 3:19:32.

== See also ==
- List of UFC events
- List of current UFC fighters
- 2020 in UFC
