= UFC Fight Night: Santos vs. Walker =

2021 MMA event

- The poster for UFC Fight Night: Santos vs. Walker
- Promotion: Ultimate Fighting Championship
- Date: October 2, 2021
- Venue: UFC Apex
- City: Enterprise, Nevada, United States
- Attendance: Not announced

Event chronology
UFC 266: Volkanovski vs. Ortega	UFC Fight Night: Santos vs. Walker	UFC Fight Night: Dern vs. Rodriguez

UFC Fight Night: Santos vs. Walker (also known as UFC Fight Night 193, UFC Vegas 38 and UFC on ESPN+ 51) was a mixed martial arts event produced by the Ultimate Fighting Championship that took place on October 2, 2021 at the UFC Apex facility in Enterprise, Nevada, part of the Las Vegas Metropolitan Area, United States.

== Background ==
A light heavyweight bout between former UFC Light Heavyweight Championship title challenger Thiago Santos and Johnny Walker headlined the event.

A women's bantamweight bout between Aspen Ladd and The Ultimate Fighter: Heavy Hitters featherweight winner Macy Chiasson was expected to take place at the event. The pairing was initially scheduled for UFC on ESPN: Sandhagen vs. Dillashaw, but it was removed from that card on July 19 after Chiasson suffered a stress fracture in her foot. At the weigh-ins, Ladd weighed in at 137 pounds, one pound over the bantamweight non-title limit, leading to the fight cancellation.

A light heavyweight bout between Jimmy Crute and Jamahal Hill was initially targeted for the event. However, the bout was rescheduled in early September for UFC Fight Night: Font vs. Aldo two months later.

A lightweight bout between Carlos Diego Ferreira and Grant Dawson was scheduled for the event. However, Ferreira pulled out of the fight in early September citing an injury. Dawson was then rescheduled to face Ricky Glenn at UFC Fight Night: Costa vs. Vettori.

The Ultimate Fighter: Brazil 2 welterweight winner Leonardo Santos and Alexander Hernandez were expected to meet in a lightweight bout at the event. However, Santos pulled out of the event due to undisclosed reasons. He was replaced by Mike Breeden.

At the weigh-ins, two other fighters missed weight for their respective bouts. Mike Breeden weighed in at 158.5 pounds, two and a half pounds over the lightweight non-title fight limit. Former UFC Women's Bantamweight Championship challenger Bethe Correia weighed in at 138.5 pounds, two and a half pounds over the women's bantamweight non-title fight limit. Both bouts proceeded at a catchweight with Breeden and Correia each fined 20% of their purses, which went to their opponents Alexander Hernandez and Karol Rosa respectively.

== Results ==
Main card (ESPN+)
Weight class				Method	Round	Time	Notes
Light Heavyweight	Thiago Santos	def.	Johnny Walker	Decision (unanimous) (48–47, 48–47, 48–47)	5	5:00
Middleweight	Kevin Holland	vs.	Kyle Daukaus	No Contest (accidental clash of heads)	1	3:43	(Note: Accidental clash of heads knocked Holland unconscious.)
Welterweight	Niko Price	def.	Alex Oliveira	Decision (unanimous) (29–28, 29–28, 29–28)	3	5:00
Middleweight	Krzysztof Jotko	def.	Misha Cirkunov	Decision (split) (29–28, 28–29, 29–28)	3	5:00
Catchweight (158.5 lb)	Alexander Hernandez	def.	Mike Breeden	KO (punch)	1	1:20
Preliminary card (ESPN+)
Lightweight	Jared Gordon	def.	Joe Solecki	Decision (split) (28–29, 29–28, 29–28)	3	5:00
Women's Flyweight	Casey O'Neill	def.	Antonina Shevchenko	TKO (punches)	2	4:47
Catchweight (138.5 lb)	Karol Rosa	def.	Bethe Correia	Decision (unanimous) (30–27, 30–27, 30–26)	3	5:00
Lightweight	Jamie Mullarkey	def.	Devonte Smith	TKO (punches)	2	2:51
Bantamweight	Douglas Silva de Andrade	def.	Gaetano Pirrello	KO (punch)	1	2:04
Women's Bantamweight	Stephanie Egger	def.	Shanna Young	TKO (elbow)	2	2:22
Bantamweight	Alejandro Pérez	def.	Johnny Eduardo	Submission (scarf hold armlock)	2	4:13

== Bonus awards ==
The following fighters received $50,000 bonuses.

- Fight of the Night: No bonus awarded.
- Performance of the Night: Casey O'Neill, Jamie Mullarkey, Douglas Silva de Andrade and Alejandro Pérez

== See also ==
- List of UFC events
- List of current UFC fighters
- 2021 in UFC
