= Casey O'Neill =

Scottish-Australian mixed martial artist (born 1997)

- Born: 7 October 1997 (age 29); Irvine, Scotland
- Other names: King
- Nationality: Australian; British
- Height: 5 ft 6 in (1.68 m)
- Weight: 125 lb (57 kg; 8 st 13 lb)
- Division: Strawweight (2019); Flyweight (2020–present)
- Reach: 69 in (175 cm)
- Style: Kickboxing
- Fighting out of: Las Vegas, Nevada, U.S.
- Team: Tiger Muay Thai (2019–2020); Xtreme Couture MMA (2020–2024); Fight Ready (2024–present)
- Rank: Brown belt in Brazilian Jiu-Jitsu under Casey Halstead
- Years active: 2019–present

Mixed martial arts record
- Total: 14
- Wins: 12
- By knockout: 4
- By submission: 3
- By decision: 5
- Losses: 2
- By submission: 1
- By decision: 1

Other information
- Mixed martial arts record from Sherdog

Casey O'Neill (born 7 October 1997) is a Scottish and Australian professional mixed martial artist. She currently competes in the women's Flyweight division of the Ultimate Fighting Championship (UFC). As of September 19, 2026, she is #11 in the Meta UFC women's flyweight rankings.

== Early life ==
O'Neill was born in Irvine, Scotland and spent the early years of her life living in Kilmarnock. Her father, Cam, was a professional kickboxer and she began training in kickboxing at the age of four. At the age of 10 she moved with her family to Australia's Gold Coast where she attended Coombabah State High School. At the age of 13, O'Neill began training in other martial arts such as Brazilian jiu-jitsu.

Her father eventually relented and allowed O'Neill to compete in her first amateur MMA fight at the age of 15 where she was soundly beaten in the first round by an opponent four years her senior. She competed in another amateur fight the following year and was again defeated early in the first round. O'Neill then committed to honing her skills and spent the next two years training before returning to amateur circuit at 19 years of age. She then strung together five consecutive amateur wins before turning professional at 21 years of age. In 2019, O'Neill relocated to Phuket, Thailand to begin training at the renowned Tiger Muay Thai gym.

== Mixed martial arts career ==
=== Early career ===
O'Neill made her professional debut against Amira Hafizović at the Eternal MMA 43 event on 5 April 2019 and was victorious via a unanimous decision. She then secured three more wins domestically against Jada Ketley, Miki Motono, in which she missed weight by 0.2 kg and was forced to vacate her title, and Caitlin McEwen before accepting her first fight overseas with the UAE Warriors promotion. In September 2020 she defeated Christina Stelliou via a second-round knockout at UAE Warriors 13.

=== Ultimate Fighting Championship ===
In her UFC debut, O'Neill won with a second-round knockout victory over Shana Dobson at UFC Fight Night 185 on 20 February 2021.

O'Neill faced Lara Procópio on 19 June 2021 at UFC on ESPN 25. She won the bout after choking Procópio unconscious in the third round via rear-naked choke.

O'Neill faced Antonina Shevchenko on 2 October 2021 at UFC Fight Night 193. She won the fight via technical knockout in round two. This win earned her the Performance of the Night award.

O'Neill faced Roxanne Modafferi on 12 February 2022 at UFC 271. She won the fight via split decision. 19 out of 19 media outlets scored the fight for O'Neill. Judge Robert Alexander, who scored the fight 29-28 for Modafferi, received criticism for his scorecard. Michael Bisping, as part of the live commentary team for the broadcast, said "I don't think [Alexander] should be judging MMA. That judge does not know what he's looking at."

O'Neill was scheduled to face Jessica Eye on 2 July 2022 at UFC 276. However, O'Neill withdrew in late April due to torn ACL and was replaced by Maycee Barber.

O'Neill faced Jennifer Maia on 18 March 2023 at UFC 286. She lost the fight via unanimous decision.

O'Neill was scheduled to face Viviane Araújo on 9 September 2023 at UFC 293. However, O'Neill pulled out in early August due to injury and Araújo was rebooked for a new bout.

O'Neill faced Ariane Lipski on 16 December 2023 at UFC 296. She lost the fight via an armbar submission in the second round.

O'Neill was scheduled to face Tereza Bledá on 17 August 2024, at UFC 305. However, Bledá withdrew for unknown reasons and was replaced by Luana Santos. O'Neill defeated Santos by unanimous decision. Following this bout, O'Neill suffered a knee injury that sidelined her for almost two years.

O'Neill faced Gabriella Fernandes on 28 March 2026 at UFC Fight Night 271. She won the fight by technical knockout in the first round.

O'Neill faced Eduarda Moura on 19 September 2026 at UFC 331. She won the fight via an armbar submission in the first round. This fight earned her a $100,000 Performance of the Night award.

== Championships and accomplishments ==
=== Mixed martial arts ===
- Ultimate Fighting Championship
  - Performance of the Night (Two times) vs. Antonina Shevchenko and Eduarda Moura
  - Tied (Valentina Shevchenko) for second most finishes in UFC Women's Flyweight division history (5) (behind Gillian Robertson)
  - Tied (Manon Fiorot, Carli Judice & Maycee Barber) for second most knockouts in UFC Women's Flyweight division history (3) (behind Valentina Shevchenko)
  - Fourth most significant strikes-per-minute in UFC Women's Flyweight division history (7.60)
  - Fifth highest striking differential in UFC Women's Flyweight division history (2.24)
  - UFC.com Awards
    - 2021 Newcomer of the Year
- Eternal MMA
  - EMMA Strawweight Championship (One time)
    - One successful title defense
- MMA Fighting
  - 2021 Rookie of the Year

== Mixed martial arts record ==
Professional record breakdown
14 matches	12 wins	2 losses
By knockout	4	0
By submission	3	1
By decision	5	1

Res.	Record	Opponent	Method	Event	Date	Round	Time	Location	Notes
Win	12–2	Eduarda Moura	Submission (armbar)	UFC 331	19 September 2026	1	3:22	Los Angeles, California, United States	Performance of the Night.
Win	11–2	Gabriella Fernandes	KO (punches)	UFC Fight Night: Adesanya vs. Pyfer	28 March 2026	1	3:11	Seattle, Washington, United States	
Win	10–2	Luana Santos	Decision (unanimous)	UFC 305	18 August 2024	3	5:00	Perth, Australia	
Loss	9–2	Ariane Lipski	Submission (armbar)	UFC 296	16 December 2023	2	1:18	Las Vegas, Nevada, United States	
Loss	9–1	Jennifer Maia	Decision (unanimous)	UFC 286	18 March 2023	3	5:00	London, England	
Win	9–0	Roxanne Modafferi	Decision (split)	UFC 271	12 February 2022	3	5:00	Houston, Texas, United States	
Win	8–0	Antonina Shevchenko	TKO (punches)	UFC Fight Night: Santos vs. Walker	2 October 2021	2	4:47	Las Vegas, Nevada, United States	Performance of the Night.
Win	7–0	Lara Procópio	Technical Submission (rear-naked choke)	UFC on ESPN: The Korean Zombie vs. Ige	19 June 2021	3	2:54	Las Vegas, Nevada, United States	
Win	6–0	Shana Dobson	TKO (punches)	UFC Fight Night: Blaydes vs. Lewis	20 February 2021	2	3:41	Las Vegas, Nevada, United States	
Win	5–0	Christina Stelliou	KO (punches)	UAE Warriors 13	25 September 2020	2	2:12	Abu Dhabi, United Arab Emirates	
Win	4–0	Caitlin McEwen	Decision (unanimous)	Eternal MMA 51	29 February 2020	3	5:00	Perth, Australia	Flyweight debut.
Win	3–0	Miki Motono	Decision (unanimous)	Eternal MMA 48	4 October 2019	5	5:00	Melbourne, Australia	O'Neill missed weight (115.4 lb) and was stripped of the Eternal MMA Strawweight Championship. Only Motono was eligible to win the title.
Win	2–0	Jada Ketley	Submission (rear-naked choke)	Eternal MMA 46	27 July 2019	1	2:32	Melbourne, Australia	Defended the Eternal MMA Strawweight Championship.
Win	1–0	Amira Hafizović	Decision (unanimous)	Eternal MMA 43	5 April 2019	5	5:00	Adelaide, Australia	Strawweight debut. Won the Eternal MMA Strawweight Championship.

== See also ==
- List of current UFC fighters
- List of female mixed martial artists
