= UFC Fight Night: Overeem vs. Volkov =

2021 mixed martial arts event

- The poster for UFC Fight Night: Overeem vs. Volkov
- Promotion: Ultimate Fighting Championship
- Date: February 6, 2021
- Venue: UFC Apex
- City: Enterprise, Nevada, United States
- Attendance: None (behind closed doors)

Event chronology
| UFC 257: Poirier vs. McGregor 2 | UFC Fight Night: Overeem vs. Volkov | UFC 258: Usman vs. Burns |

UFC Fight Night: Overeem vs. Volkov (also known as UFC Fight Night 184, UFC on ESPN+ 42 and UFC Vegas 18) was a mixed martial arts event produced by the Ultimate Fighting Championship that took place on February 6, 2021 at the UFC Apex facility in Enterprise, Nevada, part of the Las Vegas Metropolitan Area, United States.

== Background ==
A heavyweight bout between the 2010 K-1 World Grand Prix Champion, former Strikeforce Heavyweight Champion and UFC Heavyweight Championship challenger Alistair Overeem and former Bellator Heavyweight World Champion Alexander Volkov served as the event headliner.

A bantamweight bout between Cory Sandhagen and former UFC Lightweight Champion Frankie Edgar took place at the event. Their first meeting was previously scheduled to happen in January 2020 at UFC Fight Night: Blaydes vs. dos Santos, but Edgar was removed from the fight in favour of a bout against former UFC Featherweight Championship challenger Chan Sung Jung a month earlier at UFC Fight Night: Edgar vs. The Korean Zombie.

A flyweight bout between Alexandre Pantoja and former Rizin FF Bantamweight Champion Manel Kape was originally scheduled to take place at UFC Fight Night: Thompson vs. Neal in early December, but Pantoja pulled out of the fight due to COVID-19 symptoms. The pairing was then rescheduled for this event.

A bantamweight bout between Merab Dvalishvili and Cody Stamann was originally scheduled to take place at UFC on ESPN: Hermansson vs. Vettori, but Stamann pulled out due to undisclosed reasons and the bout was scrapped. Instead the pairing took place at this event. In turn, Dvalishvili was forced to pull out from the bout in mid January due to his COVID-19 recovery and he was replaced by Andre Ewell. After a positive test for COVID-19, Ewell was pulled from the event and replaced by promotional newcomer Askar Askar, with the contest expected to take place at featherweight. On the day of the event, Askar was not medically cleared and the bout was cancelled.

Wellington Turman and Aliaskhab Khizriev were scheduled to meet in a middleweight bout at the event. However, the contest was scrapped as Turman withdrew due to pneumonia. Khizriev was then rescheduled to fight Kyle Daukaus at UFC Fight Night 189.

Steven Peterson was expected to face Seung Woo Choi in a featherweight bout. In turn, Peterson pulled out on January 15 due to an injury and was replaced by promotional newcomer Collin Anglin. Anglin was then pulled from the event for undisclosed reasons and replaced by Youssef Zalal.

A women's bantamweight bout between former UFC Women's Flyweight Champion Nicco Montaño and Karol Rosa was scheduled for the event. However, in the weeks leading up to the fight, Montaño was pulled from the event due to undisclosed reasons and replaced by Joselyne Edwards.

A bantamweight bout between Julio Arce and Timur Valiev was scheduled for the event. However, Arce was removed from the event in late January due to undisclosed reasons and replaced by Martin Day The bout took place at featherweight.

Alex da Silva Coelho was expected to face Devonte Smith in a lightweight bout at this event. However, Coelho pulled out due to undisclosed reasons. Smith faced Justin Jaynes instead at a catchweight of 160 pounds.

Ode' Osbourne was expected to face Denys Bondar in a catchweight bout of 130 pounds at this event. However, Bondar withdrew during fight week due to undisclosed reasons and was replaced by Jerome Rivera, with their bout taking place at featherweight. They were previously scheduled to meet at a planned date of January 30 in a flyweight bout, but the event never materialized and the pairing was cancelled.

A women's bantamweight bout between Marion Reneau and The Ultimate Fighter: Heavy Hitters women's featherweight winner Macy Chiasson was scheduled for the event. However, during the week leading up to the fight, Reneau was pulled from the card after testing positive for COVID-19. The bout was expected to remain intact and planned for three weeks later at UFC Fight Night: Rozenstruik vs. Gane. However, yet again the bout was cancelled due to Reneau tested positive for COVID-19 and the bout was moved to UFC on ESPN: Brunson vs. Holland.

== Results ==
Main card (ESPN+)
| Weight class | | | | Method | Round | Time | Notes |
|---|---|---|---|---|---|---|---|
| Heavyweight | Alexander Volkov | def. | Alistair Overeem | TKO (punches) | 2 | 2:06 |
| Bantamweight | Cory Sandhagen | def. | Frankie Edgar | KO (flying knee) | 1 | 0:28 |
| Lightweight | Clay Guida | def. | Michael Johnson | Decision (unanimous) (30–27, 30–27, 30–27) | 3 | 5:00 |
| Flyweight | Alexandre Pantoja | def. | Manel Kape | Decision (unanimous) (29–28, 29–28, 30–27) | 3 | 5:00 |
| Lightweight | Beneil Dariush | def. | Carlos Diego Ferreira | Decision (split) (28–29, 29–28, 29–28) | 3 | 5:00 |
| Light Heavyweight | Danilo Marques | def. | Mike Rodríguez | Technical Submission (rear-naked choke) | 2 | 4:52 |
Preliminary card (ESPN+)
| Catchweight (160 lb) | Devonte Smith | def. | Justin Jaynes | TKO (doctor stoppage) | 2 | 3:38 |
| Women's Bantamweight | Karol Rosa | def. | Joselyne Edwards | Decision (unanimous) (30–27, 30–27, 30–27) | 3 | 5:00 |
| Women's Flyweight | Lara Procópio | def. | Molly McCann | Decision (unanimous) (29–27, 29–28, 30–27) | 3 | 5:00 |
| Featherweight | Seung Woo Choi | def. | Youssef Zalal | Decision (unanimous) (29–28, 29–28, 30–27) | 3 | 5:00 |
| Featherweight | Timur Valiev | def. | Martin Day | Decision (unanimous) (30–25, 30–25, 30–26) | 3 | 5:00 |
| Featherweight | Ode' Osbourne | def. | Jerome Rivera | KO (punches) | 1 | 0:26 |

== Bonus awards ==
The following fighters received $50,000 bonuses.

- Fight of the Night: Beneil Dariush vs. Carlos Diego Ferreira
- Performance of the Night: Alexander Volkov and Cory Sandhagen

== See also ==
- List of UFC events
- List of current UFC fighters
- 2021 in UFC
