= Roque Martinez =

Guamanian mixed martial arts fighter

- Born: March 4, 1986 (age 40); Tamuning, Guam
- Nickname: Champ
- Height: 5 ft 10 in (1.78 m)
- Weight: 254 lb (115 kg; 18 st 2 lb)
- Division: Heavyweight; Light Heavyweight
- Reach: 72 in (183 cm)
- Fighting out of: Tamuning, Guam
- Team: Spike 22
- Years active: 2007–2025

Mixed martial arts record
- Total: 32
- Wins: 19
- By knockout: 8
- By submission: 4
- By decision: 7
- Losses: 11
- By knockout: 2
- By submission: 2
- By decision: 7
- Draws: 2

Other information
- Mixed martial arts record from Sherdog

Roque Martinez (born March 4, 1986) is a retired Chamorro mixed martial artist who competed in the Heavyweight division. He has formerly competed in the Ultimate Fighting Championship and Rizin Fighting Federation.

== Background ==
Born and raised on Guam until 12 years old, Martinez went to high school in Washington state. Along with two close friend, he signed up for fighting classes for fun. With time, the other two fell out of the sport, but Martinez kept fighting, until at the age of 27, he had first professional fight on Guam.

== Mixed martial arts career ==
=== Early career ===
Martinez compiled a 9–3–2 record on the regional Guamanian and Asian scene, with his most notable bout being a victory against Jung Da Un.

=== Rizin Fighting Federation. ===
Martinez won the DEEP Megatonweight Championship against Jaideep Singh at Deep Cage Impact 2017: At Korakuen Hall on July 15, 2017. He won the bout and title via unanimous decision.

The next bout was against Jérôme Le Banner at Rizin World Grand Prix 2017: Opening Round – Part 2 on October 15, 2017. He won the bout via a first round scarf hold.

Martinez faced Kiyoshi Kuwabara at Rizin 12 on August 12, 2018. He won the bout via TKO in the first round.

Martinez faced Mirko Cro Cop at Rizin 13 on September 30, 2018. He lost the bout after Cro Cop opened a cut on Roque's forehead and the ring doctor stopped the bout.

The first title defense of the DEEP Megatonweight Championship came against Ryo Sakai at DEEP 88 Impact on March 9, 2019. He won the bout via TKO at the end of the first round.

Martinez faced Jake Heun at Rizin 16 on June 2, 2019. Despite breaking his hand in the first round, Martinez lost a close bout via split decision.

Martinez defended the DEEP Megatonweight Championship against Seigo Mizuguchi at Deep 93 Impact on December 15, 2019. He won the bout via TKO in the second round.

Martinez faced Hideki Sekine at Rizin 21 on February 22, 2020. He won the bout via TKO after finishing Sekine off with soccer kicks and punches.

=== Ultimate Fighting Championship ===
Martinez made his debut on September 12, 2020, at UFC Fight Night: Waterson vs. Hill, when he lost to Alexander Romanov via arm-triangle choke in the second round.

Martinez faced Don'Tale Mayes on November 14, 2020 UFC Fight Night: Felder vs. dos Anjos. He lost the fight via unanimous decision.

Martinez faced Josh Parisian at UFC on ESPN: The Korean Zombie vs. Ige on June 19, 2021. He lost the bout via controversial split decision. 12 out of 14 media scores gave the victory to Martinez.

On June 29, 2021, after his third straight loss, Martinez was released from the UFC.

=== Post UFC ===
Making his return after almost a year and a half away, Martinez faced Yuichi Yokoyama on November 11, 2022 at Brawl International 2, winning the bout via rear-naked choke in the first round.

Martinez returned to Rizin, facing Tsuyoshi Sudario at Rizin Landmark 5 on April 29, 2023, losing the fight by unanimous decision.

Martinez faced Tserendash Azjargal on November 18, 2023 at Black Combat 9, winning the bout via unanimous decision.

Martinez defended and unified the DEEP Megatonweight Championship against Ryo Sakai on March 9, 2024 at DEEP 118 Impact, winning the bout via unanimous decision.

== Personal life ==
Besides his mixed martial arts career, Martinez works as an insurance adjuster.

== Championships and accomplishments ==
=== Mixed martial arts ===
- Deep
  - DEEP Megatonweight Championship (One Time)
    - Three successful title defenses

== Mixed martial arts record ==
Professional record breakdown
32 matches	19 wins	11 losses
By knockout	8	2
By submission	4	2
By decision	7	7
Draws	2	

Res.	Record	Opponent	Method	Event	Date	Round	Time	Location	Notes
Loss	19–11–2	Eduardo Garvon	Decision (unanimous)	Black Combat 14	May 6, 2025	3	5:00	Incheon, South Korea	Middleweight debut.
Loss	19–10–2	Cha Jung-hwan	Decision (unanimous)	Black Combat 13	December 28, 2024	3	5:00	Seoul, South Korea	Light Heavyweight bout.
Win	19–9–2	Kim Myung-hwan	Decision (unanimous)	Black Combat 11	July 13, 2024	3	5:00	Busan, South Korea	
Win	18–9–2	Ryo Sakai	Decision (unanimous)	DEEP 118 Impact	March 9, 2024	3	5:00	Tokyo, Japan	Defended and unified the DEEP Megatonweight Championship.
Win	17–9–2	Tserendash Azjargal	Decision (unanimous)	Black Combat 9	November 18, 2023	3	5:00	Incheon, South Korea	
Loss	16–9–2	Tsuyoshi Sudario	Decision (unanimous)	Rizin Landmark 5	April 29, 2023	3	5:00	Tokyo, Japan	
Win	16–8–2	Yuichi Yokoyama	Submission (rear-naked choke)	Brawl International 2	November 11, 2022	1	1:55	Tumon Bay, Guam	
Loss	15–8–2	Josh Parisian	Decision (split)	UFC on ESPN: The Korean Zombie vs. Ige	June 19, 2021	3	5:00	Las Vegas, Nevada, United States	
Loss	15–7–2	Don'Tale Mayes	Decision (unanimous)	UFC Fight Night: Felder vs. dos Anjos	November 14, 2020	3	5:00	Las Vegas, Nevada, United States	
Loss	15–6–2	Alexander Romanov	Submission (arm-triangle choke)	UFC Fight Night: Waterson vs. Hill	September 12, 2020	2	4:22	Las Vegas, Nevada, United States	
Win	15–5–2	Hideki Sekine	TKO (soccer kicks and punches)	Rizin 21	February 22, 2020	1	4:04	Hamamatsu, Japan	
Win	14–5–2	Seigo Mizuguchi	TKO (punches)	Deep 93 Impact	December 15, 2019	2	2:09	Tokyo, Japan	Defended the DEEP Megatonweight Championship.
Loss	13–5–2	Jake Heun	Decision (split)	Rizin 16	June 2, 2019	3	5:00	Kobe, Japan	
Win	13–4–2	Ryo Sakai	TKO (punches and elbows)	DEEP 88 Impact	March 9, 2019	1	4:59	Tokyo, Japan	Defended the DEEP Megatonweight Championship.
Loss	12–4–2	Mirko Cro Cop	TKO (doctor stoppage)	Rizin 13	September 30, 2018	1	4:58	Saitama, Japan	
Win	12–3–2	Kiyoshi Kuwabara	TKO (punches)	Rizin 12	August 12, 2018	1	4:33	Nagoya, Japan	
Win	11–3–2	Jérôme Le Banner	Submission (scarf hold)	Rizin World Grand Prix 2017: Opening Round – Part 2	October 15, 2017	1	2:09	Fukuoka, Japan	
Win	10–3–2	Jaideep Singh	Decision (unanimous)	Deep Cage Impact 2017: At Korakuen Hall	July 15, 2017	3	5:00	Tokyo, Japan	Won the DEEP Megatonweight Championship.
Draw	9–3–2	Lee Sang-soo	Draw (majority)	Top FC 12	September 11, 2016	3	5:00	Seoul, South Korea	
Win	9–3–1	Kelvin Fitial	Decision (unanimous)	Pacific Xtreme Combat 54	July 8, 2016	3	5:00	Mangilao, Guam	
Win	8–3–1	Takaaki Oban	TKO (punches)	Pacific Xtreme Combat 52	March 18, 2016	2	N/A	Mangilao, Guam	
Win	7–3–1	Jung Da-un	Submission (kimura)	Top FC 9	October 24, 2015	1	4:30	Incheon, South Korea	Return to Heavyweight.
Win	6–3–1	Kim Doo-hwan	Decision (split)	Top FC 7	May 29, 2015	3	5:00	Changwon, South Korea	Light Heavyweight debut.
Win	5–3–1	Mylo Lassiter	Decision (unanimous)	Pacific Xtreme Combat 36	March 8, 2013	3	5:00	Mangilao, Guam	
Loss	4–3–1	Kelvin Fitial	TKO (punches and elbows)	Pacific Xtreme Combat 24	June 11, 2011	4	4:52	Manila, Philippines	
Draw	4–2–1	Kelvin Fitial	Draw	Pacific Xtreme Combat 22	January 20, 2011	5	5:0	Mangilao, Guam	
Loss	4–2	Kazuhisa Tazawa	Submission (achilles lock)	DEEP 47 Impact	April 17, 2010	2	2:11	Tokyo, Japan	Openweight bout.
Loss	4–1	Yusuke Kawaguchi	Decision (unanimous)	DEEP: Cage Impact 2009	December 19, 2009	3	5:00	Tokyo, Japan	For the DEEP Megatonweight Championship.
Win	4–0	Charleston Aiken	Submission (heel hook)	Pacific Xtreme Combat 15	July 25, 2008	2	0:00	Mangilao, Guam	
Win	3–0	Manny Chong	TKO (punches)	Pacific Xtreme Combat 13	November 17, 2007	1	0:00	Mangilao, Guam	
Win	2–0	Charleston Aiken	TKO	Pacific Xtreme Combat 11	April 13, 2007	2	0:00	Mangilao, Guam	
Win	1–0	Toby Mesa	TKO (elbows)	Pacific Xtreme Combat Live 1	March 24, 2007	1	3:29	Tamuning, Guam	Heavyweight debut.

== See also ==
- Samuel Martínez Roque
- List of male mixed martial artists
