= Vanessa Melo =

Brazilian mixed martial arts fighter

- Born: March 27, 1988 (age 38); Taboão da Serra, São Paulo, Brazil
- Other names: Miss Simpatia
- Height: 5 ft 5 in (1.65 m)
- Weight: 136.5 lb (62 kg; 9 st 11 lb)
- Division: Bantamweight (2017–present); Flyweight (2011–2019); Strawweight (2014)
- Reach: 65 in (165 cm)
- Fighting out of: Sao Paulo, Brazil
- Team: Babuino Gold Team
- Years active: 2011–present

Mixed martial arts record
- Total: 24
- Wins: 11
- By submission: 2
- By decision: 9
- Losses: 13
- By knockout: 1
- By decision: 12

Other information
- Mixed martial arts record from Sherdog

Vanessa De Melo Silva (born March 27, 1988) is a Brazilian mixed martial artist who competes in the Lightweight division. She is most known for her time spent fighting in the Ultimate Fighting Championship (UFC) and Professional Fighters League (PFL).

== Mixed martial arts career ==
=== Early career ===
Melo started her mma career fighting in various promotions in Brazil and amassed a record of 10–5 prior signed by UFC.

=== Ultimate Fighting Championship ===
Melo was welcomed into the UFC as a short-notice replacement by Irene Aldana at UFC on September 21, 2019. At the weigh-ins, Melo weighed in at 140 pounds, 4 pounds over the bantamweight non-title fight limit of 136. She was fined 30% of her purse and her bout with Aldana proceeded at a catchweight. Aldana won the fight by unanimous decision.

Melo's next fight was again a late-replacement fight against Tracy Cortez on November 11, 2019 in Sao Paulo at UFC Fight Night: Błachowicz vs. Jacaré. At the weigh-ins, Cortez and Melo both missed weight for their fight, both weighing in at 136.5 pounds, 0.5 pounds over the bantamweight non-title fight limit of 136. The bout was initially proceeded at a catchweight and no fine was issued due to identical misses. However, later on the same day, Brazil's athletic commission (CABMMA) executive director Cristiano Sampaio announced that due to an error of the scale used at the weight-ins was set was 0.7 pounds above the official scale and thus both fighters were officially clear from missing weight and the bout proceeded at bantamweight. Melo lost the bout by unanimous decision.

Melo faced Karol Rosa at UFC 251 on July 11, 2020. She weighed in at 141 pounds, five pounds over the bantamweight non-title fight limit. She lost the fight via unanimous decision.

Melo was scheduled to face Sarah Moras on November 7, 2020 at UFC Fight Night 182. However, Moras tested positive for COVID-19 and the bout was postponed to take place at UFC on ABC: Holloway vs. Kattar on January 16, 2021. She won the fight via unanimous decision.

On February 4, 2021, it was announced that Melo was released from her UFC contract.

=== Professional Fighters League ===
Melo faced Martina Jindrová on May 6, 2022 at PFL 3. She lost the bout via unanimous decision.

Melo faced Olena Kolesnyk on July 1, 2022 at PFL 6. She lost the bout via unanimous decision.

== Championships and accomplishments ==
- Standout Fighting Tournament
  - SFT Flyweight Championship

== Mixed martial arts record ==
Professional record breakdown
24 matches	11 wins	13 losses
By knockout	0	1
By submission	2	0
By decision	9	12

Res.	Record	Opponent	Method	Event	Date	Round	Time	Location	Notes
Loss	11–13	Alana Cook	Decision (split)	BTC 32	September 13, 2025	3	5:00	Niagara Falls, Ontario, Canada	
Loss	11–12	Fernanda Barbosa	Decision (split)	Standout Fighting Tournament 48	June 8, 2024	3	5:00	São Paulo, Brazil	
Loss	11–11	Sidy Rocha	Decision (unanimous)	Standout Fighting Tournament 44	November 18, 2023	3	5:00	São Paulo, Brazil	Return to Bantamweight.
Loss	11–10	Olena Kolesnyk	Decision (unanimous)	PFL 6 (2022)	July 1, 2022	3	5:00	Atlanta, Georgia, United States	
Loss	11–9	Martina Jindrová	Decision (unanimous)	PFL 3 (2022)	May 6, 2022	3	5:00	Arlington, Texas, United States	Lightweight debut.
Win	11–8	Sarah Moras	Decision (unanimous)	UFC on ABC: Holloway vs. Kattar	January 16, 2021	3	5:00	Abu Dhabi, United Arab Emirates	
Loss	10–8	Karol Rosa	Decision (unanimous)	UFC 251	July 11, 2020	3	5:00	Abu Dhabi, United Arab Emirates	Catchweight (141 lb) bout; Melo missed weight.
Loss	10–7	Tracy Cortez	Decision (unanimous)	UFC Fight Night: Błachowicz vs. Jacaré	November 16, 2019	3	5:00	São Paulo, Brazil	
Loss	10–6	Irene Aldana	Decision (unanimous)	UFC Fight Night: Rodríguez vs. Stephens	September 21, 2019	3	5:00	Mexico City, Mexico	Catchweight (140 lb) bout; Melo missed weight.
Win	10–5	Jan Finney	Decision (unanimous)	Battlefield FC 2	July 27, 2019	3	5:00	Macau, SAR, China	
Win	9–5	Mariana Morais	Decision (split)	Future FC 5	May 24, 2019	3	5:00	São Paulo, Brazil	Return to Bantamweight.
Win	8–5	Nilde Trindade	Decision (unanimous)	Future FC 2	February 22, 2019	3	5:00	São Paulo, Brazil	
Win	7–5	Daiane Firmino	Decision (split)	SFT 6	October 27, 2018	3	5:00	São Paulo, Brazil	Won vacant SFT Flyweight Championship.
Win	6–5	Núbia Santos do Nascimento	Decision (unanimous)	SFT 5	September 29, 2018	3	5:00	São Paulo, Brazil	
Loss	5–5	Suvi Salmimies	Decision (split)	Cage 37	November 26, 2017	3	5:00	Helsinki, Finland	Bantamweight debut.
Win	5–4	Molly McCann	Decision (unanimous)	XFC International 12	November 28, 2015	3	5:00	São Paulo, Brazil	
Win	4–4	Juliana Leite	Submission (rear-naked choke)	Gold Fight 7	September 26, 2015	1	4:01	São Paulo, Brazil	
Loss	3–4	Silvana Gómez Juárez	Decision (unanimous)	XFC International 8	December 13, 2014	3	5:00	Campinas, Brazil	Return to Flyweight.
Loss	3–3	Vanessa Guimarães	Decision (split)	XFC International 6	September 27, 2014	3	5:00	São Paulo, Brazil	For the XFC Strawweight Championship.
Win	3–2	Gloria Bravo	Decision (unanimous)	XFC International 3	March 29, 2014	3	5:00	São Paulo, Brazil	Strawweight debut.
Win	2–2	Suelen Pereira	Submission (rear-naked choke)	Circuito Talent de MMA 5	November 23, 2013	1	3:37	São Paulo, Brazil	Flyweight bout.
Loss	1–2	Juliana Werner	Decision (unanimous)	MMA Super Heroes 1	July 13, 2013	3	5:00	São Paulo, Brazil	Flyweight bout.
Loss	1–1	Camila Lima	TKO (punches)	CT Fight	May 19, 2012	1	3:46	São Paulo, Brazil	
Win	1–0	Natalie Santos	Decision (unanimous)	Fight Stars	September 14, 2011	3	5:00	São Paulo, Brazil	

== See also ==
- List of female mixed martial artists
