= Jerome Rivera =

American mixed martial arts fighter

- Born: April 22, 1995 (age 31); Santa Fe, New Mexico, United States
- Other names: The Renegade
- Height: 5 ft 10 in (1.78 m)
- Weight: 125 lb (57 kg; 8 st 13 lb)
- Division: Flyweight; Bantamweight; Featherweight
- Reach: 72 in (183 cm)
- Style: Kickboxing, Wrestling
- Stance: Southpaw
- Fighting out of: Santa Fe, New Mexico
- Team: Luttrell/Yee MMA & Fitness
- Years active: 2014–present

Mixed martial arts record
- Total: 16
- Wins: 10
- By submission: 7
- By decision: 3
- Losses: 6
- By knockout: 3
- By submission: 2
- By decision: 1

Other information
- Mixed martial arts record from Sherdog

Jerome Rivera (born April 22, 1995) is an American mixed martial artist who competes in the Flyweight division. He most notably competed in the Ultimate Fighting Championship.

== Background ==
Rivera started training in 2011, Rivera held an amateur kickboxing belt for SWKA, which is a promotion in Las Cruces, New Mexico. Since he was a kid, he loved watching UFC and wrestled at school.

== Mixed martial arts career ==
=== Early career ===
Rivera made his MMA debut at Triple-A MMA 5 Redemption at the Rock, where he faced Levi Lucero and submitted him via rear-naked choke in the first round. Rivera would go on to defeat his next three foes, all by the way of submission stoppages. After defeating Jesus Urbina at KOTC Thunder via unanimous decision and Saul Elizondo in the second round via rear-naked choke at Jackson-Wink Fight Night 1, Riveria made his Legacy Fighting Alliance debut at LFA 10, where he faced Zac Riley and went on to defeat him via unanimous decision.

In June 2017, Rivera lost for the first time to Roberto Sanchez via third round armbar at LFA 14. After a 11 months layoff, he suffered a dislocated elbow in a loss by injury to Brandon Royval at LFA 39. Rivera had Tommy John surgery in May 2018 and returned just nine months later for what was then his ninth professional fight. During this time, he would dig wells with one arm a couple weeks after elbow surgery, desperate for any job to make sure he was providing for the arrival of Emilia, who was two years old.

In his first bout after the injury, Rivera faced Gene Perez at Jackson’s MMA Series 27 and won the bout in the first round via armbar. Making his return to Legacy Fighting Alliance, he took on Kendrick Latchman in the co-main event of LFA 80 and submitted him via triangle choke in the second round.

He was given a chance for a UFC contract on Dana White's Contender Series, fighting Ronaldo Rodríguez at Dana White's Contender Series 27 on August 4, 2020. He won the fight via unanimous decision, but was not offered an UFC contract.

=== Ultimate Fighting Championship ===
After his win on DWCS and not being offered a contract, Rivera was offered to make his UFC debut as a replacement for Matt Schnell after he was forced to pull out of the bout against Nam the week before. Rivera made his UFC debut against Tyson Nam on September 19, 2020, at UFC Fight Night: Covington vs. Woodley in a Bantamweight bout. He lost the fight via technical knockout early into the second round.

Moving back down to Flyweight, Rivera faced Francisco Figueiredo at UFC on ESPN: Chiesa vs. Magny on January 20, 2021. He lost the bout via unanimous decision.

Rivera faced Ode' Osbourne on February 6, 2021, at UFC Fight Night: Overeem vs. Volkov in a featherweight bout, as a replacement for Denys Bondar. Rivera lost the fight via knockout out in round one.

Rivera faced Zhalgas Zhumagulov on July 10, 2021, at UFC 264 in a flyweight bout. He lost the fight via a guillotine choke in round one.

On August 21, 2021, it was announced Rivera was released by the UFC.

== Mixed martial arts record ==
Professional record breakdown
16 matches	10 wins	6 losses
By knockout	0	3
By submission	7	2
By decision	3	1

Res.	Record	Opponent	Method	Event	Date	Round	Time	Location	Notes
Loss	10–6	Zhalgas Zhumagulov	Submission (guillotine choke)	UFC 264	July 10, 2021	1	2:02	Las Vegas, Nevada, United States	Return to Flyweight.
Loss	10–5	Ode' Osbourne	KO (punches)	UFC Fight Night: Overeem vs. Volkov	February 6, 2021	1	0:26	Las Vegas, Nevada, United States	Featherweight debut.
Loss	10–4	Francisco Figueiredo	Decision (unanimous)	UFC on ESPN: Chiesa vs. Magny	January 20, 2021	3	5:00	Abu Dhabi, United Arab Emirates	
Loss	10–3	Tyson Nam	TKO (punches)	UFC Fight Night: Covington vs. Woodley	September 19, 2020	2	0:34	Las Vegas, Nevada, United States	Bantamweight bout.
Win	10–2	Ronaldo Rodríguez	Decision (unanimous)	Dana White's Contender Series 27	August 4, 2020	3	5:00	Las Vegas, Nevada, United States	
Win	9–2	Kendrick Latchman	Submission (triangle choke)	LFA 80	January 17, 2020	2	4:12	Albuquerque, New Mexico, United States	
Win	8–2	Gene Perez	Submission (armbar)	Jackson's MMA Series 27	February 23, 2019	1	1:07	Santa Fe, New Mexico, United States	
Loss	7–2	Brandon Royval	TKO (arm injury)	LFA 39	May 4, 2018	1	0:40	Vail, Colorado, United States	
Loss	7–1	Roberto Sanchez	Submission (armbar)	LFA 14	June 23, 2017	3	3:41	Houston, Texas, United States	For the inaugural LFA Flyweight Championship.
Win	7–0	Zac Riley	Decision (unanimous)	LFA 10	April 21, 2017	3	5:00	Pueblo, Colorado, United States	Bantamweight debut.
Win	6–0	Saul Elizondo	Submission (rear-naked choke)	JacksonWink Fight Night 1	February 25, 2017	2	1:13	Albuquerque, New Mexico, United States	
Win	5–0	Jesus Urbina	Decision (unanimous)	KOTC: Thunder	October 31, 2015	3	5:00	Socorro, Texas, United States	
Win	4–0	Alejandro Diaz	Submission (rear-naked choke)	KOTC: Warriors	August 8, 2015	2	1:35	Socorro, Texas, United States	
Win	3–0	Roger Reyes	Submission (triangle choke)	Rocks Xtreme MMA 12	February 28, 2015	1	2:14	Harker Heights, Texas, United States	
Win	2–0	Rudy Kennedy	Submission (punches)	Triple A MMA 11	December 6, 2014	2	2:53	Santa Fe, New Mexico, United States	
Win	1–0	Levi Lucero	Submission (rear-naked choke)	Triple A MMA 5	March 29, 2014	1	1:37	Santa Fe, New Mexico, United States	Flyweight debut.

== See also ==
- List of male mixed martial artists
