= Lara Procópio =

Brazilian mixed martial arts fighter

Lara Fritzen
- Born: Lara Fritzen Procópio de Amorim; November 14, 1995 (age 30); Belo Horizonte, Minas Gerais, Brazil
- Height: 5 ft 4 in (1.63 m)
- Weight: 125 lb (57 kg; 8 st 13 lb)
- Division: Flyweight
- Reach: 67 in (170 cm)
- Team: Nova União
- Rank: Black belt in Brazilian Jiu-Jitsu
- Years active: 2015–present

Mixed martial arts record
- Total: 11
- Wins: 9
- By knockout: 1
- By submission: 3
- By decision: 5
- Losses: 2
- By submission: 1
- By decision: 1

Other information
- Mixed martial arts record from Sherdog

Lara Fritzen Procópio de Amorim (born November 11, 1995) is a Brazilian mixed martial artist who competes in the Flyweight division. She has previously fought in the Ultimate Fighting Championship (UFC).

== Background ==
The daughter of Brazilian jiu-jitsu instructors, Fritzen has been involved in martial arts since her early childhood. She has won multiple Minas Gerais state championships and also Brazilian nationals in lower belt ranks.

== Mixed martial arts career ==
=== Early career ===
After going 3–0 as an amateur, Fritzen turned professional in 2015. After turning pro, she compiled a 6–0 record on the regional Brazilian scene, winning the Shooto Brazil Women's Bantamweight Championship at Shooto Brasil 81 against Mariana Morais via unanimous decision and the Shooto Brazil Women's Flyweight Championship against Sidy Rocha at Shooto Brasil 87 via unanimous decision.

=== Ultimate Fighting Championship ===
Fritzen made her promotional debut against Karol Rosa at UFC Fight Night: Andrade vs. Zhang on August 31, 2019. She lost a close back and forth fight by split decision, in the process suffering her first career loss.

Fritzen was suspended for 6 months by USADA after she tested positive for ostarine as the result of a urine sample collected out-of-competition on February 17, 2020. Lara provided an open container of a dietary supplement that she was using prior to her positive test, and which she declared on her doping control form for analysis at a WADA-accredited laboratory. Although no prohibited substances were listed on the supplement label, the analysis revealed the presence of ostarine in the product. She was eligible to return on August 17, 2020.

Fritzen faced Molly McCann on February 6, 2021, at UFC Fight Night: Overeem vs. Volkov. She won the fight via unanimous decision.

Fritzen faced Casey O'Neill at UFC on ESPN: The Korean Zombie vs. Ige on June 19, 2021. She lost the bout after being choked unconscious by O'Neill in the third round via rear-naked choke.

On July 2, 2021, it was announced that Fritzen was released from the UFC.

=== Post UFC ===
In her first performance after her UFC release, Procópio faced Alana Sousa on August 13, 2022, at Fight Pro Championship 2. She won the bout via armbar in the first round.

Lara faced Aline Sattelmayer on March 19, 2023, at Imortal FC 12, winning the bout via unanimous decision.

== Championships and accomplishments ==
=== Mixed martial arts ===
- Shooto Brazil
  - Shooto Brazil Flyweight Championship (One time)
  - Shooto Brazil Bantamweight Championship (One time)

== Mixed martial arts record ==
Professional record breakdown
| 11 matches | 9 wins | 2 losses |
| By knockout | 1 | 0 |
| By submission | 3 | 1 |
| By decision | 5 | 1 |

| Res. | Record | Opponent | Method | Event | Date | Round | Time | Location | Notes |
|---|---|---|---|---|---|---|---|---|---|
| Win | 9–2 | Aline Sattelmayer | Decision (unanimous) | Imortal FC 12 | March 19, 2023 | 3 | 5:00 | Curitiba, Brazil | |
| Win | 8–2 | Alana Sousa | Submission (armbar) | Fight Pro Championship 2 | August 13, 2022 | 1 | 3:33 | Bragança Paulista, Brazil | Catchweight (132 lb) bout. |
| Loss | 7–2 | Casey O'Neill | Technical Submission (rear-naked choke) | UFC on ESPN: The Korean Zombie vs. Ige | June 19, 2021 | 3 | 2:54 | Las Vegas, Nevada, United States | |
| Win | 7–1 | Molly McCann | Decision (unanimous) | UFC Fight Night: Overeem vs. Volkov | February 6, 2021 | 3 | 5:00 | Las Vegas, Nevada, United States | Return to Flyweight. |
| Loss | 6–1 | Karol Rosa | Decision (split) | UFC Fight Night: Andrade vs. Zhang | August 31, 2019 | 3 | 5:00 | Shenzhen, China | Bantamweight bout. |
| Win | 6–0 | Sidy Rocha | Decision (unanimous) | Shooto Brasil 87 | August 24, 2018 | 3 | 5:00 | Rio de Janeiro, Brazil | Won the vacant Shooto Brazil Women's Flyweight Championship. |
| Win | 5–0 | Mariana Morais | Decision (unanimous) | Shooto Brasil 81 | March 17, 2018 | 3 | 5:00 | Rio de Janeiro, Brazil | Won the vacant Shooto Brazil Women's Bantamweight Championship. |
| Win | 4–0 | Mayra Cantuária | Submission (armbar) | Shooto Brazil 77 | October 27, 2017 | 1 | 3:26 | Guarapari, Brazil | |
| Win | 3–0 | Amanda Caroline | Decision (unanimous) | BH Sparta 10 | November 19, 2016 | 3 | 5:00 | Vila Velha, Brazil | |
| Win | 2–0 | Erica Leidianny Ribeiro | TKO (punches) | BH Sparta 8 | April 15, 2016 | 1 | 2:39 | Vitória, Brazil | |
| Win | 1–0 | Bruna Mara | Submission (armbar) | Upper Fight MMA Championship 6 | March 16, 2015 | 1 | 2:00 | Vitória, Brazil | Bantamweight debut. |

== See also ==
- List of female mixed martial artists
