= São Simão, São Paulo =

São Simão
- Municipality
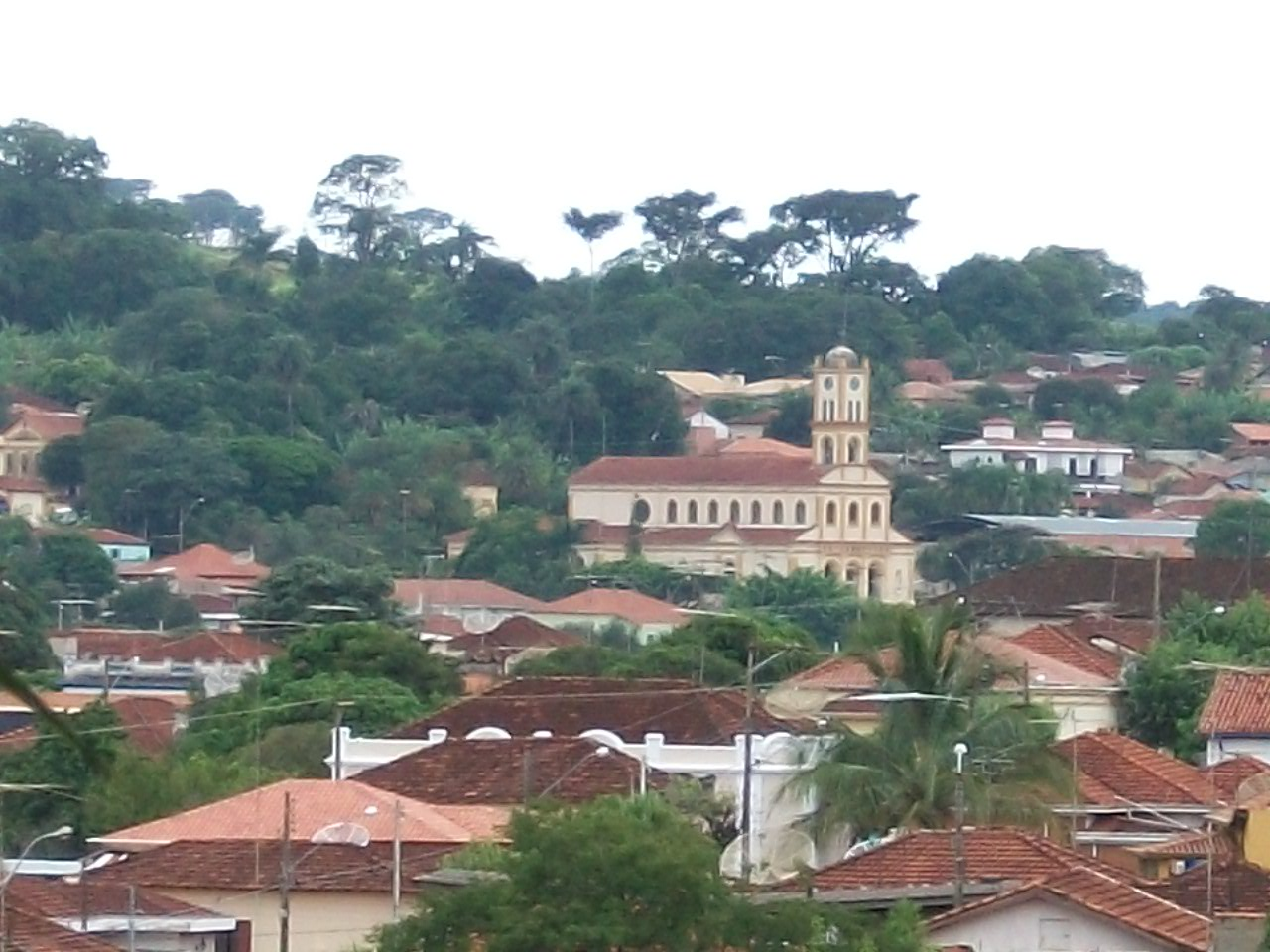
- View of São Simão, São Paulo

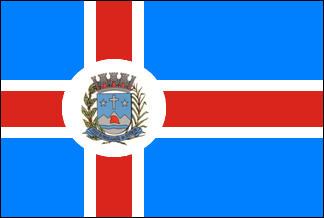
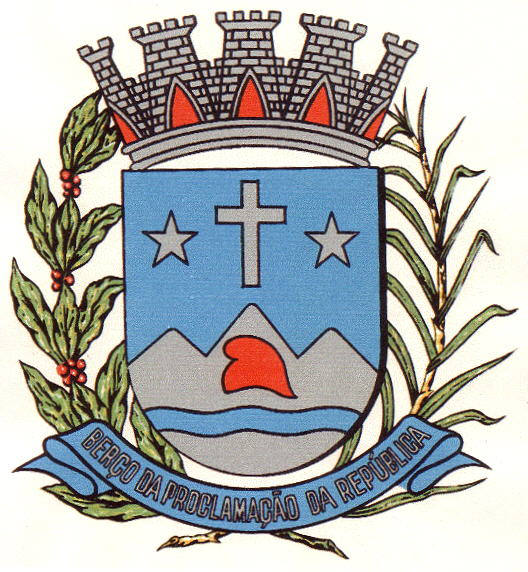
- Flag Coat of arms

- Location in São Paulo state

- Location in Brazil
- Coordinates: 21°28′45″S 47°33′3″W
- Country: Brazil
- Region: Southeast
- State: São Paulo

Area
  - Total: 617 km^{2} (238 sq mi)

Population (2020)
  - Total: 15,385
  - Density: 24.9/km^{2} (64.6/sq mi)
- Time zone: UTC−3 (BRT)

São Simão is a municipality in the state of São Paulo in Brazil. The population is 15,385 (2020 est.) in an area of 617 km^{2} (238 sq mi). The elevation is 665 m.

== Geography ==
=== Climate ===
Climate data for São Simão, São Paulo (1981–2010)
| Month | Jan | Feb | Mar | Apr | May | Jun | Jul | Aug | Sep | Oct | Nov | Dec | Year |
|---|---|---|---|---|---|---|---|---|---|---|---|---|---|
| Mean daily maximum °C (°F) | 30.4 (86.7) | 31.0 (87.8) | 30.7 (87.3) | 29.7 (85.5) | 27.0 (80.6) | 26.6 (79.9) | 27.0 (80.6) | 29.1 (84.4) | 30.0 (86.0) | 30.9 (87.6) | 30.5 (86.9) | 30.2 (86.4) | 29.4 (84.9) |
| Daily mean °C (°F) | 24.3 (75.7) | 24.3 (75.7) | 24.0 (75.2) | 22.5 (72.5) | 19.4 (66.9) | 18.3 (64.9) | 18.5 (65.3) | 20.5 (68.9) | 22.2 (72.0) | 23.6 (74.5) | 23.8 (74.8) | 24.0 (75.2) | 22.1 (71.8) |
| Mean daily minimum °C (°F) | 20.1 (68.2) | 19.9 (67.8) | 19.4 (66.9) | 17.3 (63.1) | 13.9 (57.0) | 12.1 (53.8) | 11.9 (53.4) | 13.4 (56.1) | 16.1 (61.0) | 17.9 (64.2) | 18.7 (65.7) | 19.7 (67.5) | 16.7 (62.1) |
| Average precipitation mm (inches) | 271.6 (10.69) | 204.3 (8.04) | 156.7 (6.17) | 66.3 (2.61) | 63.3 (2.49) | 24.1 (0.95) | 20.0 (0.79) | 25.6 (1.01) | 68.6 (2.70) | 129.1 (5.08) | 165.2 (6.50) | 255.7 (10.07) | 1,450.5 (57.11) |
| Average precipitation days (≥ 1.0 mm) | 16 | 12 | 11 | 6 | 5 | 3 | 2 | 3 | 6 | 9 | 11 | 15 | 99 |
| Average relative humidity (%) | 78.7 | 77.7 | 76.3 | 73.7 | 74.1 | 71.2 | 64.8 | 58.1 | 61.3 | 65.8 | 70.4 | 76.8 | 70.7 |
| Mean monthly sunshine hours | 162.0 | 173.4 | 207.9 | 225.0 | 211.7 | 206.0 | 224.2 | 232.0 | 192.3 | 202.9 | 195.1 | 168.7 | 2,401.2 |
Source: Instituto Nacional de Meteorologia

== Media ==
In telecommunications, the city was served by Companhia Telefônica Brasileira until 1973, when it began to be served by Telecomunicações de São Paulo. In July 1998, this company was acquired by Telefónica, which adopted the Vivo brand in 2012.

The company is currently an operator of cell phones, fixed lines, internet (fiber optics/4G) and television (satellite and cable).

== See also ==
- List of municipalities in São Paulo
- Interior of São Paulo
