= Canceled UFC event on April 25, 2020 =

UFC mixed martial arts event in 2020

UFC Fight Night: Smith vs. Teixeira
- The poster for UFC Fight Night: Smith vs. Teixeira
- Promotion: Ultimate Fighting Championship
- Date: April 25, 2020 (cancelled)
- Venue: Pinnacle Bank Arena
- City: Lincoln, Nebraska, United States

Event chronology
UFC Fight Night: Overeem vs. Harris	UFC Fight Night: Smith vs. Teixeira	UFC Fight Night: Hermansson vs. Weidman

UFC Fight Night: Smith vs. Teixeira was a planned mixed martial arts event produced by the Ultimate Fighting Championship originally planned to take place on April 25, 2020 at Pinnacle Bank Arena in Lincoln, Nebraska, United States. Due to the COVID-19 pandemic, UFC president Dana White announced on April 9 that starting with UFC 249, all future events were indefinitely postponed. The event was officially cancelled on April 20.

== Background ==
A light heavyweight bout between former UFC Light Heavyweight Championship challengers Anthony Smith and Glover Teixeira was expected to serve as the event headliner.

A lightweight bout between Christos Giagos and Alan Patrick was scheduled for the event. However, Giagos pulled out of the fight on March 19 citing injury and was replaced by Frank Camacho.

A light heavyweight bout between former interim title challenger Ovince Saint Preux and Shamil Gamzatov was scheduled for the event. However, Gamzatov was forced to pull out of the event due to travel restrictions related to the COVID-19 pandemic. He was replaced by Ion Cuțelaba.

A heavyweight bout between Rodrigo Nascimento and Don’Tale Mayes was expected to take place at UFC Fight Night: Overeem vs. Harris. However, the event was cancelled due to the COVID-19 pandemic. The pairing was rescheduled for this event.

Also due to travel restrictions, some Brazilian fighters were unable to compete due to visa issues on the original date – Ariane Carnelossi (who was expected to face Mackenzie Dern in a women's strawweight bout) and Raphael Pessoa (who was expected to face Alexander Romanov in a heavyweight bout). Carnelossi was replaced by Hannah Cifers.

== Cancelled fight card ==
Fight card
Weight class				Method	Round	Time	Notes
Light Heavyweight	Anthony Smith	vs.	Glover Teixeira				(Note: Moved to the new UFC Fight Night: Smith vs. Teixeira.)
Featherweight	Billy Quarantillo	vs.	Gavin Tucker				(Note: Quarantillo later booked to face Spike Carlyle at UFC on ESPN: Woodley vs. Burns.)
Women's Flyweight	Cynthia Calvillo	vs.	Antonina Shevchenko				(Note: Shevchenko later booked to face former UFC Women's Flyweight Championship challenger Katlyn Chookagian at UFC on ESPN: Woodley vs. Burns.)
Lightweight	Evan Dunham	vs.	Michael Johnson				(Note: Johnson later booked to face Khama Worthy at UFC 249.)
Lightweight	Roosevelt Roberts	vs.	Matt Frevola				(Note: Roberts later booked to face Brok Weaver at UFC on ESPN: Woodley vs. Burns.)
Middleweight	Andrew Sanchez	vs.	Zak Cummings
Welterweight	Anthony Rocco Martin	vs.	David Zawada
Featherweight	Peter Barrett	vs.	Danny Henry
Lightweight	Alan Patrick	vs.	Frank Camacho
Light Heavyweight	Ovince Saint Preux	vs.	Ion Cuțelaba				(Note: Saint Preux later booked to face Ben Rothwell at the new UFC Fight Night: Smith vs. Teixeira.)
Heavyweight	Rodrigo Nascimento	vs.	Don'Tale Mayes				(Note: Moved to UFC on ESPN: Overeem vs. Harris.)
Middleweight	Karl Roberson	vs.	Marvin Vettori				(Note: Moved to the new UFC Fight Night: Smith vs. Teixeira.)
Women's Strawweight	Mackenzie Dern	vs.	Hannah Cifers				(Note: Moved to UFC on ESPN: Woodley vs. Burns.)

== See also ==
- List of UFC events
- List of current UFC fighters
- 2020 in UFC
