= Michael Johnson (fighter) =

American mixed martial arts fighter (born 1986)

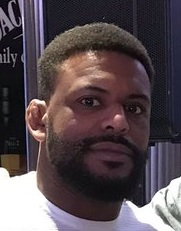
- Johnson in 2018
- Born: Michael Julian Johnson; June 4, 1986 (age 40); St. Louis, Missouri, U.S.
- Nickname: The Menace
- Height: 5 ft 10 in (1.78 m)
- Weight: 155 lb (70 kg; 11.1 st)
- Division: Lightweight (2008–2017, 2019–present); Featherweight (2018–2019)
- Reach: 73 in (185 cm)
- Stance: Southpaw
- Fighting out of: Lantana, Florida, U.S.
- Team: Blackzilians/Kill Cliff FC
- Rank: Purple belt in Brazilian jiu-jitsu under Gilbert Burns
- Wrestling: NJCAA Wrestling
- Years active: 2008–present

Mixed martial arts record
- Total: 44
- Wins: 24
- By knockout: 10
- By submission: 2
- By decision: 12
- Losses: 20
- By knockout: 4
- By submission: 9
- By decision: 7

Other information
- Website: michaeljohnson.com
- Mixed martial arts record from Sherdog

Michael Julian Johnson (born June 4, 1986) is an American professional mixed martial artist. Johnson currently fights in the Lightweight division of the Ultimate Fighting Championship (UFC). A professional since 2008, Johnson mostly competed in his regional circuit, before signing onto the Ultimate Fighting Championship to appear on The Ultimate Fighter: Team GSP vs. Team Koscheck, in which he was the runner-up.

== Background ==
Johnson was born in St. Louis, Missouri, on June 4, 1986. He was raised as the youngest of three siblings. Johnson began fighting at the age of 10, after his father's fatal heart attack. The incident made Johnson want to exert his anger physically. Johnson later said, "I lost something, a huge part of me....Fighting was my way of not dealing with my dad's passing. Now that I think of it, of course, it was the wrong thing to do, especially putting all that burden on my mom having to deal with it." Athletic, Johnson was a three-sport varsity athlete at Marquette High School in Clarkson Valley, Missouri. Johnson later received a full scholarship to play football at Central Methodist University, but transferred after one year to Meramec Community College, where he was one of the top NJCAA wrestlers in the country.

== Mixed martial arts career ==
=== Early career ===
Johnson is a former Midwest Fight League and Xtreme Cage Fighting Champion who won those titles in July 2008 and October 2009, respectively. Johnson trained at Springfield Fight Club, which is an affiliate of Gracie Barra based in Springfield, Missouri. Johnson also worked there as the assistant mixed martial arts coach.

=== The Ultimate Fighter ===
Johnson then signed onto the Ultimate Fighting Championship circuit to appear on The Ultimate Fighter: Team GSP vs. Team Koscheck.

Johnson's entry into the show was, in part, due to his persistence in attending tryouts for the show. After making the final interview round of The Ultimate Fighter: Team Nogueira vs. Team Mir, Johnson was told that he wasn't the right fit for the show. Johnson then tried out for the ninth season of the show, before finally becoming accepted onto the twelfth season after telling the producers, "I've been getting tired of chasing you [expletive] around the country. I'm here; I'm not going to go anywhere. If you guys don't pick me, I'm going to try out again." Finally, Johnson was signed.

Johnson's first fight took place on the debut episode of the season, where he faced unbeaten Pablo Garza. Johnson scored a unanimous decision victory, which moved him into the house.

In the second episode, both St-Pierre and Koscheck had Johnson at the top of their lists when it came time to select fighters. During the team selection process, however, St-Pierre created a fake list that did not have Johnson among his top selections and subtly showed it to Koscheck to fool him into believing it. This seemed to manipulate Koscheck into picking Marc Stevens, as he may have believed he could take Johnson later. This allowed St-Pierre to choose Johnson with the second overall pick.

Johnson competed in his preliminary round matchup against Aaron Wilkinson in the third episode. After some early striking exchanges in the first round, Wilkinson was able to take Johnson down and utilize ground-and-pound punches and elbows. In the second round, Johnson landed an early superman punch, as well as a takedown. After takedowns were achieved by both men, Johnson stuffed a final attempt and took the second round on the judges' scorecards. In the sudden victory round, Johnson attacked quickly, which allowed him to end the fight via a rear-naked choke.

In episode 8, Team GSP had to pick which team members would fight each other (considering they had 5 members in the quarter-finals). St. Pierre asked each member to pick the fighter they wanted to fight. Johnson and Alex Caceres picked each other and a fight was scheduled. Johnson won by unanimous decision after two rounds, earning himself a spot in the semi-finals.

In the final round, Johnson faced the one remaining Team Koscheck member, Nam Phan. In a back-and-forth fight, Johnson scored takedowns. The consensus after the fight was that Johnson won the opening round, and Phan the second. The third was in dispute, however, with each fighter's coach convinced they had won the round. Johnson was declared the winner via split decision.

=== Ultimate Fighting Championship ===
==== 2010 ====
Johnson made his UFC debut in The Ultimate Fighter: Team GSP vs. Team Koscheck Finale against Jonathan Brookins, on December 14, 2010. That fight determined the winner of The Ultimate Fighter 12. After an impressive first round, Johnson lost rounds two and three — and subsequently the fight — via unanimous decision, leaving him the runner-up.

==== 2011 ====
Johnson was looking to take a fight outside of the UFC before returning to the promotion. The fight was to headline the North American Fighting Championship card against Jim Bleau. However, after obtaining a UFC fight, Johnson pulled out of the NAFC bout to focus his training on the UFC bout. Johnson faced Edward Faaloloto on June 26, 2011, at UFC on Versus 4 and won the fight via TKO in the first round.

Johnson faced Paul Sass on October 1, 2011, at UFC on Versus 6. He lost the fight via submission in the first round.

==== 2012 ====
Johnson was expected to face Cody McKenzie on January 28, 2012, at UFC on Fox 2. However, McKenzie was forced out of the bout, with an injury, and he was replaced by Shane Roller. Johnson defeated Roller by unanimous decision, with all three judges scoring the bout 29–28.

Johnson faced Tony Ferguson on May 5, 2012, at UFC on Fox 3, replacing an injured Thiago Tavares. Johnson won the fight via unanimous decision.

Johnson was expected to face Danny Castillo on September 1, 2012, at UFC 151. However, after UFC 151 was cancelled, Johnson/Castillo was rescheduled and took place on October 5, 2012, at UFC on FX 5. After almost being finished in the first round, Johnson survived and came back to win via KO at 1:06 into the second round. Johnson was awarded Knockout of the Night honors for his performance.

Johnson fought Myles Jury on December 29, 2012, at UFC 155. He lost the fight via unanimous decision.

==== 2013 ====
Johnson faced Reza Madadi on April 6, 2013, at UFC on Fuel TV 9. Despite almost finishing Madadi with a head kick in the first round, Johnson eventually succumbed to the wrestling of Madadi and lost the fight via submission in the third round.

Johnson faced Joe Lauzon on August 17, 2013, at UFC Fight Night 26. He won the fight via unanimous decision, after outstriking Lauzon for all three rounds.

Johnson faced Gleison Tibau on December 28, 2013, at UFC 168. He won the fight by knockout in the second round.

==== 2014 ====
Due to an injury to Ross Pearson, Johnson stepped in to face Melvin Guillard at UFC Fight Night 37. Johnson won the fight via unanimous decision.

Johnson was expected to face Josh Thomson on July 26, 2014, at UFC on Fox 12. However, on July 11, the UFC announced, that Johnson had been pulled from the bout. It was later revealed that Johnson had been pulled from the bout and would not compete for the remainder of 2014 following his arrest in Palm Beach County, Florida, in April of that year.

==== 2015 ====
Johnson faced Edson Barboza on February 22, 2015, at UFC Fight Night 61. He won the bout by unanimous decision.

A bout with Benson Henderson was initially linked as the event headliner for The Ultimate Fighter 21 Finale on July 12, 2015. Although never officially announced by the UFC, the bout between Henderson and Johnson will not take place at this event.

Johnson faced Beneil Dariush on August 8, 2015, at UFC Fight Night 73. Johnson lost the fight via controversial split decision. Every mainstream MMA media outlet polled by MMA Decisions scored the fight as decision victory for Johnson.

Johnson faced Nate Diaz on December 19, 2015, at UFC on Fox 17. He lost the fight by unanimous decision. Both participants were awarded Fight of the Night honors.

==== 2016 ====
A rematch with Tony Ferguson was expected to take place on March 5, 2016, at UFC 196. However, on January 27, it was announced, that Johnson withdrew from the bout, due to an injury.

Johnson faced Dustin Poirier on September 17, 2016, at UFC Fight Night 94. Johnson won the fight via knockout early in the first round with a sharp two-punch combination followed by ground and pound. This win earned Johnson his first Performance of the Night bonus award.

Johnson next faced Khabib Nurmagomedov on November 12, 2016, at UFC 205. He lost the fight via submission in the third round.

==== 2017 ====
Johnson faced former World Series of Fighting champion Justin Gaethje on July 7, 2017, in the main event at The Ultimate Fighter 25 Finale. Rocking Gaethje twice with punches, Johnson was not able to capitalize and lost the fight via TKO, with a combination of punches and knees in the second round. The fight earned Johnson his second Fight of the Night bonus award.

==== 2018 ====
Johnson faced Darren Elkins in a featherweight bout on January 14, 2018, at UFC Fight Night 124. He lost the fight via submission in the second round.

Johnson faced Andre Fili on August 25, 2018, at UFC Fight Night 135. He won the fight via split decision.

Johnson faced Artem Lobov on October 27, 2018, at UFC Fight Night 138. At weigh-ins, Johnson weighed in at 147 pounds, one pounds over the featherweight limit of 146 pounds. As a result, the fight proceeded at a catchweight bout and Johnson was to forfeit 20% of his purse to Lobov, however, Lobov refused to take the money. Johnson defeated Lobov by unanimous decision.

==== Consecutive losses ====
Johnson faced Josh Emmett on March 30, 2019, at UFC on ESPN 2. Despite being up on the judges scorecards, Johnson lost the fight via knockout, late in the third round.

Johnson faced Stevie Ray at UFC Fight Night 162 on October 26, 2019. He lost the fight via majority decision.

Johnson was scheduled to face Evan Dunham on April 25, 2020. However, due to the COVID-19 pandemic event, Johnson was rescheduled to face Khama Worthy at UFC 249. In turn, the bout was postponed to a future date. However, the event was cancelled. However, on April 9, Dana White, the president of UFC announced that this event was postponed to a future date. Instead, Johnson faced Thiago Moisés on May 13, 2020, at UFC Fight Night 171. After outstriking Moisés in the first round, Johnson lost the fight via submission, less than thirty seconds into the second round.

Johnson faced Clay Guida on February 6, 2021, at UFC Fight Night 184. He lost the fight via unanimous decision.

==== Return to victory ====
Johnson was scheduled to face Alan Patrick on May 7, 2022, at UFC 274. However, the bout was pushed back, one week to UFC on ESPN 36, for unknown reasons. Johnson won the fight via knockout in the second round, snapping his three year long losing streak and getting his first knockout victory since 2016 in the process.

Johnson faced Jamie Mullarkey on July 9, 2022, at UFC on ESPN 39. He lost the fight via controversial split decision. 15 out of 19 media outlets scored the fight in favor of Johnson. The bout earned Johnson his third Fight of the Night bonus award.

Johnson faced Marc Diakiese on December 3, 2022, at UFC on ESPN 42. He won the bout via unanimous decision.

Johnson faced Carlos Diego Ferreira on May 20, 2023 at UFC Fight Night 223. He lost the fight via knockout in the second round.

Johnson faced Darrius Flowers on February 10, 2024, at UFC Fight Night 236. He dominated most of the bout on the ground and won by unanimous decision.

Johnson faced Ottman Azaitar on December 14, 2024, at UFC on ESPN 63. He won the fight by knockout in the second round. This fight earned Johnson another Performance of the Night award.

Johnson faced Daniel Zellhuber on July 19, 2025 at UFC 318. He won the fight by unanimous decision.

==== 2026 ====
Johnson was scheduled to face Alexander Hernandez on January 24, 2026 at UFC 324. However, the fight was cancelled on the day of the event, with the promotion giving no official reason. The cancellation followed notable betting‑line movement on the matchup, and it was reported that some observers speculated Hernandez may have been dealing with an injury, although this was not confirmed by the UFC. UFC CEO and president Dana White later confirmed that the fight had been pulled from the card due to betting concerns.

Johnson faced Drew Dober on March 7, 2026 at UFC 326. He lost the fight by knockout in the second round.

==== 2027 ====
Johnson is scheduled to face Lance Gibson Jr. on January 30, 2027 at UFC 336.

== Championships and accomplishments ==
=== Mixed martial arts ===
- Ultimate Fighting Championship
  - Fight of the Night (Three times) vs. Nate Diaz, Justin Gaethje and Jamie Mullarkey
  - Knockout of the Night (One time) vs. Danny Castillo
  - Performance of the Night (Two times) vs. Dustin Poirier and Ottman Azaitar
  - Fourth most bouts in UFC Lightweight division history (28)
  - Third most total time in UFC Lightweight division history (5:15:20)
  - Tied (Melvin Guillard) for most knockdowns in UFC Lightweight division history (13)
  - Third most significant strikes landed in UFC Lightweight division history (1308)
  - UFC.com Awards
    - 2013: Ranked #6 Upset of the Year vs. Joe Lauzon
    - 2017: Fight of the Year vs. Justin Gaethje
- Xtreme Cage Fighting
  - XCF Lightweight Championship (One time)
- Midwest Fight League
  - MFL Lightweight Championship (One time)
- Sherdog
  - 2017 Fight of the Year vs. Justin Gaethje
  - 2017 Round of the Year (Round 2) vs. Justin Gaethje
- Sports Illustrated
  - 2017 Fight of the Year vs. Justin Gaethje at The Ultimate Fighter: Redemption Finale
- Bleacher Report
  - 2017 Fight of the Year vs. Justin Gaethje
- Yahoo Sports
  - 2017 Fight of the Year vs. Justin Gaethje at The Ultimate Fighter: Redemption Finale
- CBS Sports
  - 2017 UFC Fight of the Year vs. Justin Gaethje
- MMA Fighting
  - 2017 Fight of the Year vs. Justin Gaethje at The Ultimate Fighter: Redemption Finale
- MMA Junkie
  - 2017 Fight of the Year vs. Justin Gaethje at The Ultimate Fighter: Redemption Finale
  - 2017 Round of the Year (Round 1) vs. Justin Gaethje
- Bloody Elbow
  - 2017 Best Fight of the Year vs. Justin Gaethje
- Cageside Press
  - 2017 Fight of the Year vs. Justin Gaethje
- Combat Press
  - 2017 Fight of the Year vs. Justin Gaethje at The Ultimate Fighter: Redemption Finale
- MMA Weekly
  - 2017 Fight of the Year vs. Justin Gaethje at The Ultimate Fighter: Redemption Finale

== Mixed martial arts record ==
Professional record breakdown
44 matches	24 wins	20 losses
By knockout	10	4
By submission	2	9
By decision	12	7

Res.	Record	Opponent	Method	Event	Date	Round	Time	Location	Notes
Loss	24–20	Drew Dober	KO (punch)	UFC 326	March 7, 2026	2	1:53	Las Vegas, Nevada, United States	
Win	24–19	Daniel Zellhuber	Decision (unanimous)	UFC 318	July 19, 2025	3	5:00	New Orleans, Louisiana, United States	
Win	23–19	Ottman Azaitar	KO (punch)	UFC on ESPN: Covington vs. Buckley	December 14, 2024	2	2:03	Tampa, Florida, United States	Performance of the Night.
Win	22–19	Darrius Flowers	Decision (unanimous)	UFC Fight Night: Hermansson vs. Pyfer	February 10, 2024	3	5:00	Las Vegas, Nevada, United States	
Loss	21–19	Carlos Diego Ferreira	KO (punch)	UFC Fight Night: Dern vs. Hill	May 20, 2023	2	1:50	Las Vegas, Nevada, United States	
Win	21–18	Marc Diakiese	Decision (unanimous)	UFC on ESPN: Thompson vs. Holland	December 3, 2022	3	5:00	Orlando, Florida, United States	
Loss	20–18	Jamie Mullarkey	Decision (split)	UFC on ESPN: dos Anjos vs. Fiziev	July 9, 2022	3	5:00	Las Vegas, Nevada, United States	Fight of the Night.
Win	20–17	Alan Patrick	KO (punches)	UFC on ESPN: Błachowicz vs. Rakić	May 14, 2022	2	3:22	Las Vegas, Nevada, United States	
Loss	19–17	Clay Guida	Decision (unanimous)	UFC Fight Night: Overeem vs. Volkov	February 6, 2021	3	5:00	Las Vegas, Nevada, United States	
Loss	19–16	Thiago Moisés	Submission (achilles lock)	UFC Fight Night: Smith vs. Teixeira	May 13, 2020	2	0:25	Jacksonville, Florida, United States	
Loss	19–15	Stevie Ray	Decision (majority)	UFC Fight Night: Maia vs. Askren	October 26, 2019	3	5:00	Kallang, Singapore	Return to Lightweight.
Loss	19–14	Josh Emmett	KO (punch)	UFC on ESPN: Barboza vs. Gaethje	March 30, 2019	3	4:14	Philadelphia, Pennsylvania, United States	
Win	19–13	Artem Lobov	Decision (unanimous)	UFC Fight Night: Volkan vs. Smith	October 27, 2018	3	5:00	Moncton, New Brunswick, Canada	Catchweight (147 lb) bout; Johnson missed weight.
Win	18–13	Andre Fili	Decision (split)	UFC Fight Night: Gaethje vs. Vick	August 25, 2018	3	5:00	Lincoln, Nebraska, United States	
Loss	17–13	Darren Elkins	Submission (rear-naked choke)	UFC Fight Night: Stephens vs. Choi	January 14, 2018	2	2:22	St. Louis, Missouri, United States	Featherweight debut.
Loss	17–12	Justin Gaethje	TKO (punches and knees)	The Ultimate Fighter: Redemption Finale	July 7, 2017	2	4:48	Las Vegas, Nevada, United States	Fight of the Night. Fight of the Year (2017).
Loss	17–11	Khabib Nurmagomedov	Submission (kimura)	UFC 205	November 12, 2016	3	2:31	New York City, New York, United States	
Win	17–10	Dustin Poirier	KO (punches)	UFC Fight Night: Poirier vs. Johnson	September 17, 2016	1	1:35	Hidalgo, Texas, United States	Performance of the Night.
Loss	16–10	Nate Diaz	Decision (unanimous)	UFC on Fox: dos Anjos vs. Cowboy 2	December 19, 2015	3	5:00	Orlando, Florida, United States	Fight of the Night.
Loss	16–9	Beneil Dariush	Decision (split)	UFC Fight Night: Teixeira vs. Saint Preux	August 8, 2015	3	5:00	Nashville, Tennessee, United States	
Win	16–8	Edson Barboza	Decision (unanimous)	UFC Fight Night: Bigfoot vs. Mir	February 22, 2015	3	5:00	Porto Alegre, Brazil	
Win	15–8	Melvin Guillard	Decision (unanimous)	UFC Fight Night: Gustafsson vs. Manuwa	March 8, 2014	3	5:00	London, England	
Win	14–8	Gleison Tibau	KO (punches)	UFC 168	December 28, 2013	2	1:32	Las Vegas, Nevada, United States	
Win	13–8	Joe Lauzon	Decision (unanimous)	UFC Fight Night: Shogun vs. Sonnen	August 17, 2013	3	5:00	Boston, Massachusetts, United States	
Loss	12–8	Reza Madadi	Submission (brabo choke)	UFC on Fuel TV: Mousasi vs. Latifi	April 6, 2013	3	1:33	Stockholm, Sweden	
Loss	12–7	Myles Jury	Decision (unanimous)	UFC 155	December 29, 2012	3	5:00	Las Vegas, Nevada, United States	
Win	12–6	Danny Castillo	KO (punches)	UFC on FX: Browne vs. Bigfoot	October 5, 2012	2	1:06	Minneapolis, Minnesota, United States	Knockout of the Night.
Win	11–6	Tony Ferguson	Decision (unanimous)	UFC on Fox: Diaz vs. Miller	May 5, 2012	3	5:00	East Rutherford, New Jersey, United States	
Win	10–6	Shane Roller	Decision (unanimous)	UFC on Fox: Evans vs. Davis	January 28, 2012	3	5:00	Chicago, Illinois, United States	
Loss	9–6	Paul Sass	Submission (heel hook)	UFC Live: Cruz vs. Johnson	October 1, 2011	1	3:00	Washington, D.C., United States	
Win	9–5	Edward Faaloloto	TKO (punches)	UFC Live: Kongo vs. Barry	June 26, 2011	1	4:42	Pittsburgh, Pennsylvania, United States	
Loss	8–5	Jonathan Brookins	Decision (unanimous)	The Ultimate Fighter: Team GSP vs. Team Koscheck Finale	December 4, 2010	3	5:00	Las Vegas, Nevada, United States	The Ultimate Fighter 12 Lightweight Tournament Final.
Win	8–4	Chris McDaniel	TKO (punches)	FM Productions 7	January 30, 2010	1	4:34	Springfield, Missouri, United States	
Win	7–4	Ramiro Hernandez	Decision (unanimous)	Titan FC 15	December 18, 2009	3	5:00	Kansas City, Kansas, United States	Catchweight (150 lb) bout.
Win	6–4	Aaron Derrow	TKO (punches)	Xtreme Cage Fighter 10	October 3, 2009	1	0:43	Springfield, Missouri, United States	Won the XCF Lightweight Championship.
Loss	5–4	Eric Marriott	Submission (heel hook)	FM Productions 6	May 9, 2009	2	1:32	Springfield, Missouri, United States	
Win	5–3	Clay French	Submission (kimura)	Fuel Fight Club	April 10, 2009	1	3:16	Lake Ozark, Missouri, United States	
Loss	4–3	Joe Brammer	Submission (guillotine choke)	Midwest Cage Championship 19	March 14, 2009	4	3:45	Des Moines, Iowa, United States	
Loss	4–2	James Krause	Submission (triangle choke)	FM Productions 4	November 22, 2008	1	2:55	Springfield, Missouri, United States	
Win	4–1	Warren Stewart	TKO (punches)	FM Productions 3	September 13, 2008	1	2:37	Springfield, Missouri, United States	
Win	3–1	Lucas Gwaltney	Decision (majority)	Midwest Fight League: Battle at the Blue Note 9	July 25, 2008	3	5:00	Columbia, Missouri, United States	Won the MFL Lightweight Championship
Loss	2–1	Ted Worthington	Submission (triangle choke)	Midwest Cage Championship 13	April 25, 2008	3	1:29	Urbandale, Iowa, United States	
Win	2–0	Steve Schneider	Submission (rear naked-choke)	FM Productions 2	April 18, 2008	1	2:12	Springfield, Missouri, United States	
Win	1–0	Chauncey Prather	TKO (punches)	FM Productions 1	February 1, 2008	1	1:12	Springfield, Missouri, United States	

=== Mixed martial arts exhibition record ===
Exhibition record breakdown		
4 matches	4 wins	0 losses
By submission	1	0
By decision	3	0

Res.	Record	Opponent	Method	Event	Date	Round	Time	Location	Notes
Win	4–0	Nam Phan	Decision (split)	The Ultimate Fighter: Team GSP vs. Team Koscheck	December 1, 2010 (airdate)	3	5:00	Las Vegas, Nevada, United States	The Ultimate Fighter 12 Semi-finals.
Win	3–0	Alex Caceres	Decision (unanimous)	The Ultimate Fighter: Team GSP vs. Team Koscheck	November 17, 2010 (airdate)	2	5:00	Las Vegas, Nevada, United States	The Ultimate Fighter 12 Quarter-finals.
Win	2–0	Aaron Wilkinson	Submission (rear-naked choke)	The Ultimate Fighter: Team GSP vs. Team Koscheck	September 29, 2010 (airdate)	3	0:39	Las Vegas, Nevada, United States	The Ultimate Fighter 12 Preliminary bout.
Win	1–0	Pablo Garza	Decision (unanimous)	The Ultimate Fighter: Team GSP vs. Team Koscheck	September 15, 2010 (airdate)	2	5:00	Las Vegas, Nevada, United States	The Ultimate Fighter 12 TUF house entry bout.

== See also ==
- List of current UFC fighters
- List of male mixed martial artists
