= Kazula Vargas =

Mexican mixed martial artist

Rodrigo Vargas
- Born: Rodrigo Vargas; August 15, 1985 (age 41); Mexico City, Mexico
- Other names: Kazula
- Height: 5 ft 7 in (1.70 m)
- Weight: 155 lb (70 kg; 11 st 1 lb)
- Division: Lightweight; Welterweight
- Reach: 71.5 in (182 cm)
- Fighting out of: Mexico City, Mexico
- Team: Mexican Pride Gym
- Years active: 2011–present

Mixed martial arts record
- Total: 24
- Wins: 16
- By knockout: 7
- By submission: 7
- By decision: 2
- Losses: 8
- By knockout: 1
- By submission: 2
- By decision: 4
- By disqualification: 1

Other information
- Mixed martial arts record from Sherdog

Rodrigo Vargas (born August 15, 1985) is a Mexican professional mixed martial artist who competed in the Ultimate Fighting Championship (UFC). He competes in the lightweight division of LUX Fight League.

== Mixed martial arts career ==
=== Early career ===
Starting his professional MMA career in 2011, Vargas compiled a 11–3 record fighting most for Mexican promotions, among them, Jasaji Fighting League. In his last fight before the UFC, Vargas knocked out former UFC fighter Mike De La Torre in 18 seconds at Combate Americas: Mexico vs. The World on May 18, 2018.

=== Ultimate Fighting Championship ===
Vargas made his UFC debut against Alex da Silva Coelho at UFC Fight Night: Shevchenko vs. Carmouche 2 on August 10, 2019. He got outgrappled by Coelho throughout the fight and lost it via unanimous decision.

Vargas faced Brok Weaver at UFC Fight Night: Anderson vs. Błachowicz 2 on February 15, 2020. He lost the fight via DQ when Vargas kneed Weaver in the head while he was a grounded opponent.

Vargas was scheduled to face Alan Patrick on September 12, 2020, at UFC Fight Night: Waterson vs. Hill, but Vargas was removed from the card in early September for undisclosed reasons and replaced by Bobby Green.

Vargas faced Rong Zhu at UFC 261 on April 24, 2021. He won the fight via unanimous decision.

Vargas faced Paddy Pimblett on March 19, 2022, at UFC Fight Night 204. He lost the fight via rear-naked choke in round one.

In May 2022, it was reported that Vargas was released from the UFC.

=== LUX Fight League ===
Vargas faced Alejandro Cerquera for the vacant LUX Lightweight Championship in the main event of LUX 047. He won the fight by technical knockout in the fourth round and became the new champion.

== Career in professional wrestling ==
Vargas decided to try his hand at professional wrestling for the promotion Pro-Wrestling Resurrection, and was expected to make his debut in November 2025, teaming up with his compatriot Jean Montañez, who also has MMA experience. The team of Vargas and Montañez claimed the victory, with the latter retaining the hair of Hijo del Pirata Morgan.

== Championships and accomplishments ==
- LUX Fight League
  - LUX Lightweight Championship (One time)

== Mixed martial arts record ==
Professional record breakdown
| 24 matches | 16 wins | 8 losses |
| By knockout | 7 | 1 |
| By submission | 7 | 2 |
| By decision | 2 | 4 |
| By disqualification | 0 | 1 |

| Res. | Record | Opponent | Method | Event | Date | Round | Time | Location | Notes |
|---|---|---|---|---|---|---|---|---|---|
| Loss | 16–8 | Kristjan Tõniste | Decision (unanimous) | MMA Raju 20 | October 10, 2026 | 3 | 5:00 | Tallinn, Estonia | Return to Welterweight. |
| Loss | 16–7 | Miguel Villegas | Decision (split) | LUX 060 | April 24, 2026 | 5 | 5:00 | Guadalajara, Mexico | Lost the LUX Lightweight Championship. |
| Win | 16–6 | Alejandro Cerquera | Submission (guillotine choke) | LUX 047 | November 1, 2024 | 2 | 1:40 | Mexico City, Mexico | Won the vacant LUX Lightweight Championship. |
| Win | 15–6 | Román Córdova | Submission (arm-triangle choke) | LUX 044 | August 2, 2024 | 1 | 4:42 | Mexico City, Mexico | Catchweight (160 lb) bout. |
| Win | 14–6 | Román Córdova | Submission (arm-triangle choke) | Lutador MMA Invictus 13 | March 23, 2024 | 2 | 4:10 | Tlalnepantla de Baz, Mexico | |
| Win | 13–6 | Caleb Cervantes | Submission (kimura) | Lutador MMA Invictus 11 | June 10, 2023 | 1 | 2:49 | Tlalnepantla de Baz, Mexico | |
| Loss | 12–6 | Jesse Ronson | TKO (submission to punches) | Samourai MMA 6 | May 26, 2023 | 1 | 1:35 | Gatineau, Quebec, Canada | For the SMMA Super Lightweight Championship. |
| Loss | 12–5 | Paddy Pimblett | Submission (rear-naked choke) | UFC Fight Night: Volkov vs. Aspinall | March 19, 2022 | 1 | 3:49 | London, England | |
| Win | 12–4 | Rong Zhu | Decision (unanimous) | UFC 261 | April 24, 2021 | 3 | 5:00 | Jacksonville, Florida, United States | |
| Loss | 11–4 | Brok Weaver | DQ (illegal knee) | UFC Fight Night: Anderson vs. Błachowicz 2 | February 15, 2020 | 1 | 4:02 | Rio Rancho, New Mexico, United States | |
| Loss | 11–3 | Alex da Silva Coelho | Decision (unanimous) | UFC Fight Night: Shevchenko vs. Carmouche 2 | August 10, 2019 | 3 | 5:00 | Montevideo, Uruguay | |
| Win | 11–2 | Mike de la Torre | KO (head kick) | Combate Americas: Mexico vs. The World | May 18, 2018 | 1 | 0:18 | Tijuana, Mexico | |
| Win | 10–2 | Danny Ramirez | Decision (unanimous) | Combate Americas 15 | June 30, 2017 | 3 | 5:00 | Mexico City, Mexico | |
| Loss | 9–2 | Marco Antonio Elpidio | Decision (split) | Combate Americas 10 | January 19, 2017 | 3 | 5:00 | Mexico City, Mexico | Welterweight bout. |
| Win | 9–1 | Ivan Castillo | Submission (guillotine choke) | The Warriors Cage 25 | October 7, 2016 | 3 | 2:05 | Porterville, California, United States | |
| Win | 8–1 | Leon Lara | TKO (punches) | Coliseo Fight Series 6 | May 8, 2016 | 1 | 3:37 | Mexico | Lightweight debut. |
| Win | 7–1 | Juan Ramon Grano | Submission (guillotine choke) | Beat Down MMA 1 | October 17, 2015 | 2 | 0:31 | Toluca, Mexico | |
| Win | 6–1 | Antonio Arellano Gonzalez | KO (punches) | Jasaji Fighting League 7 | March 28, 2015 | 1 | N/A | Tlalnepantla de Baz, Mexico | For the interim JFL Welterweight Championship. |
| Win | 5–1 | Jordan Williams | TKO (doctor stoppage) | Tachi Palace Fights 19 | June 19, 2014 | 1 | 5:00 | Lemoore, California, United States | |
| Loss | 4–1 | Jose Caceres | Submission (reverse triangle choke) | Combate Americas: Level vs. Arzeno | December 12, 2013 | 1 | 3:08 | Miami, Florida, United States | |
| Win | 4–0 | Francisco Velázquez | TKO (punches) | Coliseo Gladiadores Black Samurai | July 20, 2013 | 1 | 3:37 | León, Mexico | |
| Win | 3–0 | Alfredo Morales | KO (punches) | Xtreme Kombat 11 | April 29, 2012 | 2 | 0:37 | Mexico City, Mexico | |
| Win | 2–0 | Alejandro Saaveda | KO (punch) | Xtreme Kombat 7 | January 29, 2012 | 1 | 0:11 | Mexico City, Mexico | |
| Win | 1–0 | Mario Torres | Submission (armbar) | Xtreme Fighters Latino | July 28, 2011 | 1 | 0:33 | León, Mexico | Welterweight debut. |

== See also ==
- List of male mixed martial artists
- List of Mexican UFC fighters
