= UFC on ESPN: Woodley vs. Burns =

UFC mixed martial arts event in 2020

- The poster for UFC on ESPN: Woodley vs. Burns
- Promotion: Ultimate Fighting Championship
- Date: May 30, 2020
- Venue: UFC Apex
- City: Enterprise, Nevada, United States
- Attendance: None (behind closed doors)

Event chronology
UFC on ESPN: Overeem vs. Harris	UFC on ESPN: Woodley vs. Burns	UFC 250: Nunes vs. Spencer

UFC on ESPN: Woodley vs. Burns (also known as UFC on ESPN 9 and UFC Vegas) was a mixed martial arts event produced by the Ultimate Fighting Championship that took place on May 30, 2020 at the UFC Apex facility in Enterprise, Nevada, part of the Las Vegas Metropolitan Area, United States.

== Background ==
Amid the COVID-19 pandemic, this event was originally expected to be held on May 23, but eventually was pushed back to May 30 at a yet TBD location. UFC president Dana White stated that he intended for the event to take place in Las Vegas. However, if the Nevada state government did not allow the fight to happen due to restrictions put in place in response to the COVID-19 pandemic, he would look to have the event take place in Arizona instead, since professional sports were allowed to return on May 15 without fans in attendance. White confirmed on May 20 that the event would be held at the UFC Apex facility in Las Vegas, despite no official announcement from the Nevada State Athletic Commission (NSAC) regarding permission for combat sports. The NSAC approved the return of mixed martial arts events to the state on May 27.

A welterweight bout between former UFC Welterweight Champion Tyron Woodley and Gilbert Burns was long rumored to serve as the event headliner. On May 22, Dana White confirmed the main event and entire card to be broadcast on ESPN.

Additionally, the event included fighters that were pulled from other events previously cancelled, as well as the following bouts:

- A heavyweight bout between former WSOF Heavyweight Champion Blagoy Ivanov and Augusto Sakai (scheduled for the original May 9 date of UFC 250 that later became UFC 249).
- A women's strawweight bout between Mackenzie Dern and Hannah Cifers (scheduled for UFC Fight Night: Smith vs. Teixeira on April 25).

On May 26, Kevin Holland was forced to withdraw from his scheduled welterweight bout with Daniel Rodriguez due to injury. He was replaced by promotional newcomer Gabriel Green.

At the weigh-ins, Brok Weaver weighed in at 157.5 pounds, one and a half pounds over the lightweight non-title fight limit of 156 pounds. He was fined 20% of his purse, which went to his opponent Roosevelt Roberts and their bout proceeded at a catchweight.

== Results ==
Main Card (ESPN)
Weight class				Method	Round	Time	Notes
Welterweight	Gilbert Burns	def.	Tyron Woodley	Decision (unanimous) (50–45, 50–44, 50–44)	5	5:00
Heavyweight	Augusto Sakai	def.	Blagoy Ivanov	Decision (split) (27–30, 29–28, 29–28)	3	5:00
Catchweight (150 lb)	Billy Quarantillo	def.	Spike Carlyle	Decision (unanimous) (29–28, 29–28, 29–28)	3	5:00
Catchweight (157.5 lb)	Roosevelt Roberts	def.	Brok Weaver	Submission (rear-naked choke)	2	3:26
Women's Strawweight	Mackenzie Dern	def.	Hannah Cifers	Submission (kneebar)	1	2:36
Preliminary Card (ESPN / ESPN+)
Women's Flyweight	Katlyn Chookagian	def.	Antonina Shevchenko	Decision (unanimous) (30–25, 30–25, 30–25)	3	5:00
Welterweight	Daniel Rodriguez	def.	Gabriel Green	Decision (unanimous) (30–27, 30–27, 30–27)	3	5:00
Light Heavyweight	Jamahal Hill	vs.	Klidson Abreu	No Contest (overturned)	1	1:51	(Note: Originally a TKO (knee to the body and punches) win for Hill; overturned after he tested positive for marijuana.)
Flyweight	Brandon Royval	def.	Tim Elliott	Submission (arm-triangle choke)	2	3:18
Bantamweight	Casey Kenney	def.	Louis Smolka	Submission (guillotine choke)	1	3:03
Featherweight	Chris Gutiérrez	def.	Vince Morales	TKO (leg kicks)	2	4:27

== Bonus awards ==
The following fighters received $50,000 bonuses.

- Fight of the Night: Brandon Royval vs. Tim Elliott
- Performance of the Night: Gilbert Burns and Mackenzie Dern

== Reported payout ==
The following is the reported payout to the fighters as reported to the NSAC. It does not include sponsor money and also does not include the UFC's traditional "fight night" bonuses. The total disclosed payout for the event was $1,157,000.

- Gilbert Burns: $164,000 (includes $84,000 win bonus) def. Tyron Woodley: $200,000
- Augusto Sakai: $100,000 (includes $50,000 win bonus) def. Blagoy Ivanov $60,000
- Billy Quarantillo: $24,000 (includes $12,000 win bonus) def. Spike Carlyle: $12,000
- Roosevelt Roberts: $46,400 (includes $22,000 win bonus) def. Brok Weaver: $9,600 ^
- Mackenzie Dern: $66,000 (includes $33,000 win bonus) def. Hannah Cifers: $25,000
- Katlyn Chookagian: $120,000 (includes $60,000 win bonus) def. Antonina Shevchenko: $35,000
- Daniel Rodriguez: $24,000 (includes $12,000 win bonus) def. Gabriel Green: $12,000
- Jamahal Hill: $24,000 (includes $12,000 win bonus) def. Klidson Abreu: $18,000
- Brandon Royval: $24,000 (includes $12,000 win bonus) def. Tim Elliott: $31,000
- Casey Kenney: $54,000 (includes $27,000 win bonus) def. Louis Smolka: $48,000
- Chris Gutiérrez: $40,000 (includes $20,000 win bonus) def. Vince Morales: $20,000

^ Weaver was fined 20% ($2,400) of his purse for missing weight, which went to Roberts.

== Aftermath ==
On August 5, it was announced that the NSAC issued temporary suspensions for Jamahal Hill and Tim Elliott, after they tested positive for marijuana in their respective pre-fight screenings. On September 3, the NSAC announced that Hill's victory was overturned to a no contest due to the violation. He was suspended six months and fined 15% of his fight purse. Meanwhile, Elliott was suspended four and a half months and fined 15% of his fight purse. The reduced suspension was due to his fight being taken on short notice.

== See also ==
- List of UFC events
- List of current UFC fighters
- 2020 in UFC
