= Casey Kenney =

American mixed martial artist

- Born: March 20, 1991 (age 35); Portland, Indiana, U.S.
- Height: 5 ft 7 in (1.70 m)
- Weight: 135 lb (61 kg; 9 st 9 lb)
- Division: Flyweight; Bantamweight
- Reach: 67 in (170 cm)
- Fighting out of: Tucson, Arizona, United States
- Team: Rise Combat Sports; MMA Lab
- Trainer: Chris Cariaso; John Crouch
- Rank: Second dan black belt in Judo
- Years active: 2014–2021

Mixed martial arts record
- Total: 21
- Wins: 16
- By knockout: 2
- By submission: 5
- By decision: 9
- Losses: 4
- By decision: 4
- Draws: 1

Other information
- University: University of Indianapolis
- Mixed martial arts record from Sherdog

Casey Kenney (born March 20, 1991) is an American mixed martial artist who competed in the Bantamweight division in the Ultimate Fighting Championship (UFC) and was the former Tachi Palace Fights Flyweight champion and Legacy Fighting Alliance Flyweight and Bantamweight champion.

== Background ==
Kenney was born in 1991 to Brian Kenney and Roxanne Mosier in Portland. He started training judo at the age of five, eventually becoming nine-time national champion and holds 2nd dan black belt in the sport. Besides judo, Kenney started wrestling around the time he went to school. Like in judo, Kenney excelled in wrestling too, winning multiple state championships in both freestyle and Greco-Roman wrestling.

Kenney attended Jay County High School in Indiana. After high school, he took his first amateur mixed martial arts bout on a whim without prior training. He went to study at University of Indianapolis, only to drop out after sophomore year to pursue his career in mixed martial arts. In an effort to do so, Kenney moved to Tucson to train at the MMA Lab in Glendale, Ariz. and turned professional in late 2014.

== Mixed martial arts career ==
=== Early career ===
Kenney fought most of his early professional fights primarily in the Tachi Palace Fights and Dragon House in California and Arizona. After amassing a record of 6-0 and captured the Tachi Palace Flyweight title against Alvin Cacdac, Kenney made two appearances in Dana White's Contender Series web-series program on July 18, 2017, facing C.J. Hamilton at Dana White's Contender Series 2, where he won the fight via unanimous decision, but lost to Adam Antolin at Dana White's Contender Series 8 on August 29, 2017. Kenney went on to fought under Legacy Fighting Alliance for the next four fights and he became the Flyweight and Bantamweight Legacy Fighting Alliance champion prior signed with UFC.

=== Ultimate Fighting Championship ===
In his UFC debut, Kenney faced Ray Borg, replacing Kyler Phillips in six day notice, on March 30, 2019, at UFC on ESPN 2. At the weigh-ins, Borg weighed in at 137.75 lbs, 1.75 pound over the bantamweight non-title fight limit of 136 lbs. He was fined 20% of his fight purse and his bout against Kenney proceeded at catchweight. Kenney won the fight via unanimous decision.

On December 29, 2018, Kenney faced Manny Bermudez on August 17, 2019, at UFC 241. However, the UFC decided to move the bout to a catchweight bout of 140 lbs. due to the fighters cutting substantial weight the night before weigh-ins. Kenney won the bout via unanimous decision.

Kenney faced Merab Dvalishvili on February 15, 2020, at UFC Fight Night 167. He lost the fight by unanimous decision.

Kenney faced Louis Smolka on May 30, 2020, at UFC on ESPN: Woodley vs. Burns. He won the fight via a submission through a guillotine choke in round one.

Kenney was expected to face Alateng Heili on September 27, 2020 at UFC 253. However, for unknown reasons, it was moved to UFC on ESPN: Holm vs. Aldana on October 4, 2020. He won the fight via unanimous decision.

Kenny faced Nathaniel Wood on October 24, 2020, at UFC 254. He won the back-and-forth fight via unanimous decision. This fight earned him the Fight of the Night award.

Kenney faced former WEC and UFC Bantamweight Champion Dominick Cruz at UFC 259 on March 6, 2021. He lost the fight via split decision.

Kenney faced Song Yadong on August 7, 2021, at UFC 265. He lost the fight via split decision.

After being arrested in August 2024, it was reported that Kenney was no longer on the UFC roster.

== Legal issues ==
In July 2024, Kenney was involved in an alleged domestic violence incident that was investigated by law enforcement. Video footage emerged of the alleged victim's distraught mother confronting Casey about the incident at his home, questioning why the alleged victim had marks and bruises on her body. In August 2024, Kenney was arrested in Maricopa County, Arizona and charged with domestic assault and the kidnapping of his ex-girlfriend. Kenny pleaded not guilty and was released on a $10,000 bond. In November 2025 he pleaded guilty to a lesser charge and was sentenced to 180 days in jail.

== Championships and accomplishments ==
=== Mixed martial arts ===
- Ultimate Fighting Championship
  - Fight of the Night (One time) vs. Nathaniel Wood
  - UFC.com Awards
    - 2019: Ranked #8 Newcomer of the Year
- Tachi Palace Fights
  - Tachi Palace Fights Flyweight Champion (One time)
- Legacy Fighting Alliance
  - Legacy Fighting Alliance interim Flyweight Champion (One time)
  - Legacy Fighting Alliance interim Bantamweight Champion (One time)
- MMAjunkie.com
  - 2020 October Fight of the Month vs. Nathaniel Wood

== Mixed martial arts record ==
Professional record breakdown
21 matches	16 wins	4 losses
By knockout	2	0
By submission	5	0
By decision	9	4
Draws	1	

Res.	Record	Opponent	Method	Event	Date	Round	Time	Location	Notes
Loss	16–4–1	Song Yadong	Decision (split)	UFC 265	August 7, 2021	3	5:00	Houston, Texas, United States	
Loss	16–3–1	Dominick Cruz	Decision (split)	UFC 259	March 6, 2021	3	5:00	Las Vegas, Nevada, United States	
Win	16–2–1	Nathaniel Wood	Decision (unanimous)	UFC 254	October 24, 2020	3	5:00	Abu Dhabi, United Arab Emirates	Catchweight (140 lb) bout. Fight of the Night.
Win	15–2–1	Alateng Heili	Decision (unanimous)	UFC on ESPN: Holm vs. Aldana	October 4, 2020	3	5:00	Abu Dhabi, United Arab Emirates	
Win	14–2–1	Louis Smolka	Submission (guillotine choke)	UFC on ESPN: Woodley vs. Burns	May 30, 2020	1	3:03	Las Vegas, Nevada, United States	
Loss	13–2–1	Merab Dvalishvili	Decision (unanimous)	UFC Fight Night: Anderson vs. Błachowicz 2	February 15, 2020	3	5:00	Rio Rancho, New Mexico, United States	
Win	13–1–1	Manny Bermudez	Decision (unanimous)	UFC 241	August 17, 2019	3	5:00	Anaheim, California, United States	Catchweight (140 lb) bout.
Win	12–1–1	Ray Borg	Decision (unanimous)	UFC on ESPN: Barboza vs. Gaethje	March 30, 2019	3	5:00	Philadelphia, Pennsylvania, United States	Catchweight (137.75 lb) bout; Borg missed weight.
Win	11–1–1	Vince Cachero	KO (knee)	LFA 62	March 22, 2019	1	1:38	Dallas, Texas, United States	Won the interim LFA Bantamweight Championship.
Win	10–1–1	Brandon Royval	Decision (unanimous)	LFA 53	November 9, 2018	5	5:00	Phoenix, Arizona, United States	Won the interim LFA Flyweight Championship.
Win	9–1–1	Roman Salazar	Decision (unanimous)	LFA 44	June 15, 2018	3	5:00	Phoenix, Arizona, United States	Bantamweight debut.
Win	8–1–1	Kendrick Latchman	Decision (unanimous)	LFA 31	January 19, 2018	3	5:00	Phoenix, Arizona, United States	Catchweight (130 lb) bout.
Loss	7–1–1	Adam Antolin	Decision (split)	Dana White's Contender Series 8	August 29, 2017	3	5:00	Las Vegas, Nevada, United States	
Win	7–0–1	C.J. Hamilton	Decision (unanimous)	Dana White's Contender Series 2	July 18, 2017	3	5:00	Las Vegas, Nevada, United States	
Draw	6–0–1	Bruno Gustavo da Silva	Draw (split)	LFA 11	May 5, 2017	3	5:00	Phoenix, Arizona, United States	
Win	6–0	Alvin Cacdac	Submission (rear-naked choke)	TPF 30	February 2, 2017	1	4:09	Lemoore, California, United States	Won the vacant TPF Flyweight Championship.
Win	5–0	Rafael Angel Hernandez	Submission (brabo choke)	TPF 27	May 19, 2016	1	3:44	Lemoore, California, United States	Catchweight (127 lb) bout.
Win	4–0	Anthony Torres	Submission (armbar)	TPF 26	February 18, 2016	1	1:48	Lemoore, California, United States	
Win	3–0	Victor Rosas	TKO (doctor stoppage)	TPF 25	November 19, 2015	3	4:31	Lemoore, California, United States	
Win	2–0	Paul Amaro	Decision (unanimous)	Dragon House 20	June 6, 2015	3	5:00	San Francisco, California, United States	Catchweight (130 lb) bout.
Win	1–0	Elijah Muhammad	Submission (rear-naked choke)	Duel for Domination 10	December 20, 2014	2	2:26	Mesa, Arizona, United States	Flyweight debut.

== See also ==
- List of male mixed martial artists
- List of Dana White's Contender Series alumni
