= Alan Patrick (fighter) =

Brazilian mixed martial arts fighter

- Born: Alan Patrick; July 9, 1983 (age 43); São Paulo, São Paulo, Brazil
- Other names: Nuguette
- Height: 5 ft 11 in (180 cm)
- Weight: 156 lb (71 kg; 11 st 2 lb)
- Division: Lightweight
- Reach: 74 in (188 cm)
- Fighting out of: Orlando, Florida
- Team: X-Gym (2012–2018); Fusion X-Cel Performance (2018–2021); Chute Boxe Diego Lima (2021–present)
- Rank: Black belt in Brazilian Jiu-Jitsu
- Years active: 2008–present

Mixed martial arts record
- Total: 22
- Wins: 15
- By knockout: 4
- By submission: 2
- By decision: 9
- Losses: 5
- By knockout: 4
- By decision: 1
- Draws: 1
- No contests: 1

Other information
- Mixed martial arts record from Sherdog

Alan Patrick (born July 9, 1983), is a Brazilian mixed martial artist who competes in the lightweight division. A professional MMA competitor since 2008, Patrick made a name for himself fighting in his home country of Brazil and the Ultimate Fighting Championship (UFC). He is a former Bitetti Combat Lightweight champion.

== Background ==
Patrick was born in Jacareí, São Paulo, Brazil, but grew up mostly in Brasília. Patrick has five brothers. As a consequence of alcoholic parents and disturbing household, Patrick grew up mostly in the streets.

He was interested in combat sports, but never had the money to afford training until he was introduced to a Capoeira gym that allowed him train for free and even fed him. Being successful in the sport, he gradually picked up Brazilian jiu-jitsu in the academy he also slept. Trying to follow his idol's – Ronaldo Souza's – footsteps, Patrick eventually moved to Rio de Janeiro to train mixed martial arts at the X-Gym.

== Mixed martial arts career ==
=== Early career ===
Patrick began his professional MMA career in his native Brazil in 2008. He fought for a variety of promotions including Jungle Fight and Bitetti Combat, amassing an undefeated record of 10 wins and no losses.

=== Ultimate Fighting Championship ===
After winning Bitetti Combat Lightweight Championship, Patrick made his UFC debut against Garett Whiteley on October 10, 2013, at UFC Fight Night: Maia vs. Shields. He won the fight via TKO due to punches.

He later faced John Makdessi on February 1, 2014, at UFC 169, his first fight outside Brazil. He won the fight via controversial unanimous decision, all major MMA media sites scored the fight either a draw or a win for Makdessi.

Patrick was expected to face Beneil Dariush on October 25, 2014 at UFC 179. However, Patrick pulled out of the bout with after sustaining a jaw injury and was replaced by Carlos Diego Ferreira.

Patrick faced Mairbek Taisumov on June 20, 2015 at UFC Fight Night 69. He lost the fight via TKO in the second round, the first loss of his professional MMA career.

Patrick was expected to face Chad Laprise on March 20, 2016 at UFC Fight Night 85. However, Laprise was pulled from the matchup with Patrick on March 12 in favor of a bout against Ross Pearson at the event after his initial opponent was scratched. In turn, Patrick faced promotional newcomer Damien Brown. Patrick won the fight via unanimous decision.

Patrick next faced Stevie Ray on September 24, 2016 at UFC Fight Night 95. He won the fight via unanimous decision.

Patrick faced Damir Hadžović on February 3, 2018 at UFC Fight Night 125. He won the fight via unanimous decision.

Patrick used to train in Rio de Janeiro up until this point, but after the fight with Hadžović, he moved to Orlando, Florida to train at Fusion X-cell.

Patrick faced Scott Holtzman on October 6, 2018 at UFC 229. He lost the fight via knockout in the third round after being dropped by a punch and eventually being finished with elbows.

Patrick was expected to face Christos Giagos on April 25, 2020. However, Giagos was pulled from the fight, citing injury, and he was replaced by Frank Camacho. However, on April 9, Dana White, the president of UFC announced that this event was postponed to a future date Instead Patrick was scheduled to face Marc Diakiese on July 18, 2020 at UFC Fight Night 173. However, on June 14, Patrick withdrew from the event for unknown reason and he was replaced by Rafael Fiziev.

Patrick was expected to face Rodrigo Vargas on September 12, 2020 at UFC Fight Night 177. However, Vargas was removed from the card in early September for undisclosed reasons and replaced by Bobby Green. Patrick lost the fight via unanimous decision.

Patrick faced Mason Jones on June 5, 2021 at UFC Fight Night: Rozenstruik vs. Sakai. In the second round, after being poked in the eye accidentally by Jones, Patrick was unable to continue and the bout was declared a No Contest.

A rematch with Jones was scheduled to face Mason Jones on October 23, 2021 at UFC Fight Night 196. However, Patrick withdrew from bout and he was replaced by newcomer David Onama.

Patrick was scheduled to face Michael Johnson on May 7, 2022 at UFC 274. However, the bout was pushed back one week to UFC on ESPN: Błachowicz vs. Rakić for unknown reasons. He lost the bout after getting knocked unconscious in the second round.

On August 8, 2022, it was announced that Patrick was no longer on the UFC roster.

== Personal life ==
Patrick and his wife, Luana, have a son. They moved to Orlando, Florida from their native Brazil in the summer of 2018.

== Championships and accomplishments ==
=== Mixed martial arts ===
- Bitetti Combat
  - Bitetti Combat Lightweight Championship (One time)

== Mixed martial arts record ==
Professional record breakdown
22 matches	15 wins	5 losses
By knockout	4	4
By submission	2	0
By decision	9	1
Draws	1	
No contests	1	

Res.	Record	Opponent	Method	Event	Date	Round	Time	Location	Notes
Draw	15–5–1 (1)	Vladimir Tyurin	Draw (majority)	North-West Power Alliance: World Peace 2026	May 6, 2026	2	4:33	Saint Petersburg, Russia	Welterweight debut.
Loss	15–5 (1)	Damir Ismagulov	TKO (punches)	Alash Pride 108	May 27, 2025	2	4:33	Astana, Kazakhstan	
Loss	15–4 (1)	Michael Johnson	KO (punches)	UFC on ESPN: Błachowicz vs. Rakić	May 14, 2022	2	3:22	Las Vegas, Nevada, United States	
NC	15–3 (1)	Mason Jones	NC (accidental eye poke)	UFC Fight Night: Rozenstruik vs. Sakai	June 5, 2021	2	2:14	Las Vegas, Nevada, United States	Accidental eye poke rendered Patrick unable to continue.
Loss	15–3	Bobby Green	Decision (unanimous)	UFC Fight Night: Waterson vs. Hill	September 12, 2020	3	5:00	Las Vegas, Nevada, United States	
Loss	15–2	Scott Holtzman	KO (elbows)	UFC 229	October 6, 2018	3	3:42	Las Vegas, Nevada, United States	
Win	15–1	Damir Hadžović	Decision (unanimous)	UFC Fight Night: Machida vs. Anders	February 3, 2018	3	5:00	Belém, Brazil	
Win	14–1	Stevie Ray	Decision (unanimous)	UFC Fight Night: Cyborg vs. Länsberg	September 24, 2016	3	5:00	Brasília, Brazil	
Win	13–1	Damien Brown	Decision (unanimous)	UFC Fight Night: Hunt vs. Mir	March 20, 2016	3	5:00	Brisbane, Australia	
Loss	12–1	Mairbek Taisumov	TKO (head kick and punches)	UFC Fight Night: Jędrzejczyk vs. Penne	June 20, 2015	2	1:30	Berlin, Germany	
Win	12–0	John Makdessi	Decision (unanimous)	UFC 169	February 1, 2014	3	5:00	Newark, New Jersey, United States	
Win	11–0	Garett Whiteley	TKO (punches)	UFC Fight Night: Maia vs. Shields	October 9, 2013	1	3:54	Barueri, Brazil	
Win	10–0	Claudiere Freitas	Decision (unanimous)	Bitetti Combat 15	May 11, 2013	3	5:00	Rio de Janeiro, Brazil	Won the Bitetti Combat Lightweight Championship.
Win	9–0	Kelles Albuquerque	Decision (unanimous)	Bitetti Combat 14	March 9, 2013	3	5:00	Rio de Janeiro, Brazil	
Win	8–0	Murilo Rosa Filho	TKO (doctor stoppage)	Jungle Fight 49	February 22, 2013	1	5:00	Rio de Janeiro, Brazil	
Win	7–0	Alan Ferreira	KO (head kick)	Mr. Cage 7	October 7, 2012	2	3:23	Manaus, Brazil	
Win	6–0	Michel Silva	Decision (unanimous)	Mr. Cage 4	November 30, 2010	3	5:00	Manaus, Brazil	
Win	5–0	André Batata	Decision (unanimous)	Vision Fight 1	December 20, 2009	3	5:00	Boa Vista, Brazil	Won the Vision Fight Lightweight Tournament.
Win	4–0	Ronald King	Decision (unanimous)	Vision Fight 1	December 20, 2009	3	5:00	Boa Vista, Brazil	Vision Fight Lightweight Tournament Semifinal.
Win	3–0	Augusto Cesar	Submission (rear-naked choke)	Samurai da Selva 1	December 12, 2008	1	N/A	Manaus, Brazil	
Win	2–0	Wagner Henrique	Submission (rear-naked choke)	Hero's the Jungle: Qualifying	September 20, 2008	1	2:47	Manaus, Brazil	
Win	1–0	Bruno Augusto	TKO (punches)	Hero's the Jungle 2	April 7, 2008	1	N/A	Manaus, Brazil	Lightweight debut.

== See also ==
- List of male mixed martial artists
