= Spike Carlyle =

American mixed martial arts fighter

- Born: May 6, 1993 (age 33); San Diego, California, U.S.
- Other names: The Alpha Ginger; The Crucifixion
- Height: 5 ft 8 in (1.73 m)
- Weight: 157 lb (71 kg; 11 st 3 lb)
- Division: Welterweight; Lightweight; Featherweight
- Reach: 71 in (180 cm)
- Fighting out of: San Diego, California
- Team: The Treigning Lab (until 2020); Kings MMA (2020–present)
- Rank: Black belt in Judo; Brown belt in Brazilian jiu-jitsu
- Years active: 2017–present

Mixed martial arts record
- Total: 23
- Wins: 16
- By knockout: 7
- By submission: 8
- By decision: 1
- Losses: 7
- By decision: 7

Other information
- Mixed martial arts record from Sherdog

Spike Carlyle (born May 6, 1993) is an American mixed martial artist who competes in the lightweight division of Rizin Fighting Federation. He previously competed in the Ultimate Fighting Championship (UFC) and Bellator.

== Background ==
Carlyle started doing karate when he was four years old, and later began wrestling when he was 12. He wrestled for about four years and then started jiu-jitsu. When he was 15, he took interest in Pride FC and Japanese MMA, which inspired him to become an MMA fighter.

Carlyle has also trained and competed in catch wrestling. He was the middleweight (82 kg) runner-up at the Snake Pit World Championships 2023.

== Mixed martial arts career ==
=== Early career ===
Carlyle compiled a 9-5 amateur record from 2011 until 2017.

Starting his professional career in 2017, Spike compiled a record of 8–1, fighting for a variety of regional California promotions, most notably for Legacy Fighting Alliance.

=== Ultimate Fighting Championship ===
Carlyle made his UFC debut at UFC Fight Night: Benavidez vs. Figueiredo on February 29, 2020, as a late replacement for Steven Peterson against Aalon Cruz. He won the fight via first-round TKO.

Carlyle next faced Billy Quarantillo at UFC on ESPN: Woodley vs. Burns on May 30, 2020, in a catchweight bout. He lost the bout via a unanimous decision.

Carlyle faced Bill Algeo at UFC on ESPN: Smith vs. Clark on November 28, 2020. He lost the bout via unanimous decision.

On February 4, 2021, it was announced that Carlyle had been released from his UFC contract.

=== Post UFC Career ===
Carlyle faced Batsumberel Dagvadorj on March 26, 2021, at LFA 103. He won the fight via rear-naked choke in the first round.

Carlyle faced Gil Guardado on June 9, 2021, at Ballys Fight Night. He won the bout via armbar at the end of the first round.

Carlyle faced J. J. Ambrose on October 17, 2021, at Cage Warriors 130. He won the bout via knockout in the second round.

=== Bellator MMA ===
Carlyle, as a replacement for Ricardo Seixas, faced Dan Moret on December 3, 2021, at Bellator 272. Despite absorbing heavy punishment throughout the fight and being down on all three judges scorecards, Carlyle rallied in the third round winning the fight via rear-naked choke, choking Moret unconscious.

After the win, Carlyle signed a multi-fight deal with Bellator.

As part of the cross promotion between Rizin and Bellator, Carlyle faced Koji Takeda on April 17, 2022, at Rizin 35. He won the fight by a second-round guillotine choke.

Carlyle faced A. J. McKee on October 1, 2022, at Bellator 286. At weigh ins, Carlyle missed weight, coming .6 pounds over the division non-title fight limit at 156.6 lbs and was fined 20% of his purse and the bouts continued at catchweight. In a wild and bloody bout, Carlyle came out of it with a unanimous decision loss.

=== Rizin Fighting Federation ===
Carlyle faced the Rizin Lightweight champion Roberto de Souza in a non-title bout at Rizin 42 on May 6, 2023. He lost the fight by unanimous decision.

Carlyle faced Yoshinori Horie at Rizin 44 on September 24, 2023, losing the bout via unanimous decision.

Carlyle next faced Kyung Pyo Kim at Rizin 47 on June 9, 2024. He snapped his three fight losing streak by winning via third round submission.

== Mixed martial arts record ==
Professional record breakdown
23 matches	16 wins	7 losses
By knockout	7	0
By submission	8	0
By decision	1	7

Res.	Record	Opponent	Method	Event	Date	Round	Time	Location	Notes
Win	16–7	Akihiro Murayama	TKO (punches)	Pancrase 357	September 23, 2025	1	2:07	Tokyo, Japan	Return to Welterweight.
Loss	15–7	Takeshi Izumi	Decision (unanimous)	Rizin 50	March 29, 2025	3	5:00	Takamatsu, Japan	Catchweight (160.9 lb) bout; Carlyle missed weight.
Win	15–6	Kim Kyung-pyo	Technical Submission (rear-naked choke)	Rizin 47	June 9, 2024	3	1:11	Tokyo, Japan	
Loss	14–6	Yoshinori Horie	Decision (unanimous)	Rizin 44	September 24, 2023	3	5:00	Saitama, Japan	
Loss	14–5	Roberto de Souza	Decision (unanimous)	Rizin 42	May 6, 2023	3	5:00	Tokyo, Japan	
Loss	14–4	A. J. McKee	Decision (unanimous)	Bellator 286	October 1, 2022	3	5:00	Long Beach, California, United States	Catchweight (156.6 lb) bout; Carlyle missed weight.
Win	14–3	Koji Takeda	Technical Submission (guillotine choke)	Rizin 35	April 17, 2022	2	1:35	Chōfu, Japan	Return to Lightweight.
Win	13–3	Dan Moret	Technical Submission (rear-naked choke)	Bellator 272	December 3, 2021	3	2:58	Uncasville, Connecticut, United States	Catchweight (160 lb) bout.
Win	12–3	J.J. Ambrose	KO (punch)	Cage Warriors 130	October 17, 2021	2	1:19	San Diego, California, United States	Catchweight (165 lb) bout.
Win	11–3	Gil Guardado	Submission (armbar)	Golden Boy Promotions: Ballys Fight Night	June 9, 2021	1	4:56	Long Beach, California, United States	Welterweight debut.
Win	10–3	Batsumberel Dagvadorj	Submission (rear-naked choke)	LFA 103	March 26, 2021	1	4:00	Shawnee, Oklahoma, United States	Lightweight bout.
Loss	9–3	Bill Algeo	Decision (unanimous)	UFC on ESPN: Smith vs. Clark	November 28, 2020	3	5:00	Las Vegas, Nevada, United States	
Loss	9–2	Billy Quarantillo	Decision (unanimous)	UFC on ESPN: Woodley vs. Burns	May 30, 2020	3	5:00	Las Vegas, Nevada, United States	Catchweight (150 lb) bout.
Win	9–1	Aalon Cruz	TKO (punches)	UFC Fight Night: Benavidez vs. Figueiredo	February 29, 2020	1	1:25	Norfolk, Virginia, United States	Return to Featherweight.
Win	8–1	Jean-Paul Lebosnoyani	KO (punches)	Lights Out Xtreme Fighting 4	November 15, 2019	1	1:50	Burbank, California, United States	
Win	7–1	Matthew Colquhoun	KO (spinning backfist)	LFA 74	August 30, 2019	1	3:58	Riverside, California, United States	Return to Lightweight.
Win	6–1	Fernando Padilla	Decision (unanimous)	California Xtreme Fighting 17	March 9, 2019	3	5:00	Los Angeles, California, United States	Catchweight (150 lb) bout.
Win	5–1	Brian Del Rosario	Submission (rear-naked choke)	Combate 25	September 28, 2018	2	2:41	Long Beach, California, United States	Catchweight (150 lb) bout.
Loss	4–1	Serob Minasyan	Decision (split)	California Xtreme Fighting 12	April 21, 2018	3	5:00	Burbank, California, United States	
Win	4–0	Joseph Rodriguez	Submission (rear-naked choke)	California Cage Wars 4	March 4, 2018	1	2:02	Valley Center, California, United States	Featherweight debut.
Win	3–0	Rhageem Wells	TKO (punches)	California Cage Wars 2	November 12, 2017	1	0:55	Valley Center, California, United States	
Win	2–0	Raymell Davis	KO (punch)	Gladiator Challenge: Fight Club	October 7, 2017	1	0:05	El Cajon, California, United States	
Win	1–0	Callum Highland	Submission (armbar)	California Cage Wars 1	September 3, 2017	1	1:52	Valley Center, California, United States	Lightweight debut.

== See also ==
- List of current Bellator MMA fighters
- List of male mixed martial artists
