= UFC Fight Night: Anderson vs. Błachowicz 2 =

UFC mixed martial arts event in 2020

- The poster for UFC Fight Night: Anderson vs. Błachowicz 2
- Promotion: Ultimate Fighting Championship
- Date: February 15, 2020
- Venue: Santa Ana Star Center
- City: Rio Rancho, New Mexico, United States
- Attendance: 6,449
- Total gate: $596,820

Event chronology
UFC 247: Jones vs. Reyes	UFC Fight Night: Anderson vs. Błachowicz 2	UFC Fight Night: Felder vs. Hooker

UFC Fight Night: Anderson vs. Błachowicz 2 (also known as UFC Fight Night 167 and UFC on ESPN+ 25) was a mixed martial arts event produced by the Ultimate Fighting Championship that took place on February 15, 2020 at the Santa Ana Star Center in Rio Rancho, New Mexico, United States.

== Background ==
The event was the first that the promotion has hosted in Rio Rancho, after previously contesting UFC Fight Night: Henderson vs. Khabilov in nearby Albuquerque in June 2014. Zuffa previously hosted a World Extreme Cagefighting event, WEC 32, at the venue in 2008.

A light heavyweight rematch between The Ultimate Fighter: Team Edgar vs. Team Penn light heavyweight winner Corey Anderson and former KSW Light Heavyweight Champion Jan Błachowicz served as the event headliner in a possible title eliminator. The pairing previously met in September 2015 at UFC 191, with Anderson winning the encounter via unanimous decision.

Ramazan Emeev was scheduled to face Tim Means at the event. However, Emeev was removed from the bout in late January for undisclosed reasons and replaced by promotional newcomer Daniel Rodriguez.

A light heavyweight bout between Gadzhimurad Antigulov and Devin Clark was scheduled to take place at the event. However, Antigulov was pulled from the fight due to an undisclosed reason and replaced by Dequan Townsend.

A women's bantamweight bout between former UFC Women's Flyweight Champion Nicco Montaño and Macy Chiasson was scheduled to take place at the event. However, Montaño was forced to pull out on fight week due to injury and was replaced by promotional newcomer Shanna Young.

At the weigh-ins, former UFC Flyweight Championship challenger Ray Borg failed to make weight, coming in at 128 pounds, two pounds over the flyweight non-title fight limit of 126 pounds. He was fined 30% of his fight purse, which went to Rogério Bontorin and their bout proceeded at a catchweight.

== Results ==
Main card (ESPN+)
Weight class				Method	Round	Time	Notes
Light Heavyweight	Jan Błachowicz	def.	Corey Anderson	KO (punch)	1	3:08
Welterweight	Diego Sanchez	def.	Michel Pereira	DQ (illegal knee)	3	3:09
Women's Flyweight	Montana De La Rosa	def.	Mara Romero Borella	Decision (unanimous) (30–27, 30–27, 30–27)	3	5:00
Lightweight	Brok Weaver	def.	Kazula Vargas	DQ (illegal knee)	1	4:02
Catchweight (128 lb)	Ray Borg	def.	Rogério Bontorin	Decision (unanimous) (30–27, 30–27, 30–25)	3	5:00
Lightweight	Lando Vannata	def.	Yancy Medeiros	Decision (unanimous) (30–27, 30–27, 30–27)	3	5:00
Preliminary card (ESPN+)
Welterweight	Daniel Rodriguez	def.	Tim Means	Submission (guillotine choke)	2	3:37
Bantamweight	John Dodson	def.	Nathaniel Wood	TKO (punches)	3	0:16
Lightweight	Scott Holtzman	def.	Jim Miller	Decision (unanimous) (30–27, 29–28, 29–28)	3	5:00
Light Heavyweight	Devin Clark	def.	Dequan Townsend	Decision (unanimous) (30–27, 30–26, 30–26)	3	5:00
Bantamweight	Merab Dvalishvili	def.	Casey Kenney	Decision (unanimous) (30–27, 30–25, 29–28)	3	5:00
Women's Bantamweight	Macy Chiasson	def.	Shanna Young	Decision (unanimous) (30–26, 30–26, 30–26)	3	5:00
Flyweight	Raulian Paiva	def.	Mark De La Rosa	KO (punches)	2	4:42

== Bonus awards ==
The following fighters received $50,000 bonuses.

- Fight of the Night: Scott Holtzman vs. Jim Miller
- Performance of the Night: Jan Błachowicz and Daniel Rodriguez

== Records set ==
This marked the first time two disqualifications occurred at a UFC event.

== See also ==
- List of UFC events
- List of current UFC fighters
- 2020 in UFC
