= UFC Fight Night: Waterson vs. Hill =

UFC mixed martial arts event in 2020

- The poster for UFC Fight Night: Waterson vs. Hill
- Promotion: Ultimate Fighting Championship
- Date: September 12, 2020
- Venue: UFC Apex
- City: Enterprise, Nevada, United States
- Attendance: None (behind closed doors)

Event chronology
UFC Fight Night: Overeem vs. Sakai	UFC Fight Night: Waterson vs. Hill	UFC Fight Night: Covington vs. Woodley

UFC Fight Night: Waterson vs. Hill (also known as UFC Fight Night 177, UFC on ESPN+ 35 and UFC Vegas 10) was a mixed martial arts event produced by the Ultimate Fighting Championship that took place on September 12, 2020, at the UFC Apex facility in Enterprise, Nevada, part of the Las Vegas Metropolitan Area, United States.

== Background ==
A light heavyweight bout between former UFC Light Heavyweight Championship challengers Thiago Santos and Glover Teixeira was originally scheduled to serve as the event headliner. However, it was announced on September 3 that Teixeira tested positive for COVID-19 and the bout was rescheduled for October 3 at UFC on ESPN: Holm vs. Aldana.

A women's strawweight bout between former Invicta FC Atomweight Champion Michelle Waterson and former Invicta FC Strawweight Champion Angela Hill was initially scheduled to take place three weeks earlier at UFC on ESPN: Munhoz vs. Edgar. However, due to undisclosed personal reasons for Waterson, the bout was moved to this event. Subsequently, the pairing was announced as the new main event after the postponement of Santos/Teixeira. This was the first time in UFC history that a bout involving an African-American woman served as the event headliner.

A lightweight bout between Roosevelt Roberts and Matt Frevola was previously scheduled to take place at another event earlier in the year. However, that event was cancelled in mid-March due to the COVID-19 pandemic. The pairing was rescheduled for this event. In turn, Frevola pulled out of the fight on September 11 citing an injury and was replaced by Kevin Croom.

A light heavyweight bout between Ed Herman and Gerald Meerschaert was previously scheduled for August 1 at UFC Fight Night: Brunson vs. Shahbazyan. However, on the day of the event it was announced that the bout had been scrapped from the card after Meerschaert tested positive for COVID-19. The pairing was left intact and was rescheduled for this event. In turn, Meerschaert once again pulled out of the bout and was replaced by John Allan. Allan already had a bout booked against Roman Dolidze on November 21 at UFC 255, but was expected to compete in both of them. Herman then suffered another opponent change on September 3, as Allan pulled out due to visa issues and was replaced by Mike Rodríguez.

A lightweight bout between Khama Worthy and Ottman Azaitar was previously scheduled to take place earlier this year at UFC 249. However, the event was cancelled in early April due to the COVID-19 pandemic. The pairing was then rescheduled for UFC Fight Night: Overeem vs. Sakai a week earlier. In turn, they were moved to this event due to undisclosed reasons.

A lightweight bout between Alan Patrick and Rodrigo Vargas was scheduled for this event, but Vargas was removed from the card in early September for undisclosed reasons and replaced by Bobby Green.

A flyweight bout between promotional newcomer Tagir Ulanbekov and Bruno Gustavo da Silva was expected to take place at this event. However, due to travel restrictions related to the COVID-19 pandemic, the pairing was rescheduled and expected to take place four weeks later at UFC Fight Night: Moraes vs. Sandhagen.

Frank Camacho was scheduled to face Brok Weaver in a lightweight bout at this event. However, Camacho was removed from the bout during the week leading up to the fight after testing positive for COVID-19. Weaver instead faced Jalin Turner in a catchweight bout of 165 pounds.

A flyweight bout between Matt Schnell and Tyson Nam was expected to take place at this event. However, Schnell was removed from the fight on the day of the event's weigh-in for health issues related to his weight cut. As a result, the fight was canceled.

== Results ==
Main card (ESPN+)
Weight class				Method	Round	Time	Notes
Women's Strawweight	Michelle Waterson	def.	Angela Hill	Decision (split) (47–48, 49–46, 48–47)	5	5:00
Lightweight	Ottman Azaitar	def.	Khama Worthy	TKO (punches)	1	1:33
Women's Flyweight	Roxanne Modafferi	def.	Andrea Lee	Decision (unanimous) (29–28, 29–28, 29–28)	3	5:00
Light Heavyweight	Ed Herman	def.	Mike Rodríguez	Submission (kimura)	3	4:01
Lightweight	Bobby Green	def.	Alan Patrick	Decision (unanimous) (30–27, 30–27, 30–27)	3	5:00
Featherweight	Billy Quarantillo	def.	Kyle Nelson	KO (punch)	3	0:07
Preliminary card (ESPN+)
Women's Bantamweight	Sijara Eubanks	def.	Julia Avila	Decision (unanimous) (29–27, 29–27, 29–27)	3	5:00
Lightweight	Kevin Croom	vs.	Roosevelt Roberts	No Contest (overturned)	1	0:31	(Note: Originally a submission (guillotine choke) win for Croom; overturned after he tested positive for marijuana.)
Heavyweight	Alexander Romanov	def.	Roque Martinez	Submission (arm-triangle choke)	2	4:22
Catchweight (165 lb)	Jalin Turner	def.	Brok Weaver	Submission (rear-naked choke)	2	4:20
Welterweight	Bryan Barberena	def.	Anthony Ivy	Decision (unanimous) (30–27, 30–27, 29–28)	3	5:00
Women's Flyweight	Sabina Mazo	def.	Justine Kish	Submission (rear-naked choke)	3	3:57

== Bonus awards ==
The following fighters received $50,000 bonuses.

- Fight of the Night: Michelle Waterson vs. Angela Hill
- Performance of the Night: Ottman Azaitar and Kevin Croom

== Aftermath ==
On September 18, it was announced that Mike Rodríguez will appeal his submission loss against Ed Herman citing a referee error. During the second round, Rodríguez landed a knee to Herman's body in a clinch up against the cage. Herman immediately dropped and before Rodríguez was able to deliver more strikes, referee Chris Tognoni stepped in and called a pause to the action due to a possible low blow. Herman was allowed five minutes to recover as a standard procedure and eventually won the fight in the third round. Also of note in the appeal, Rodríguez's team alleged that during the finishing sequence Herman illegally had his toes in the fence to sweep into top position and gain more leverage for the hold. Subsequently, the request for an appeal was denied by the Nevada State Athletic Commission (NSAC).

On November 4, it was announced that the NSAC issued a four and a half month suspension for Kevin Croom, after he tested positive for marijuana in a pre-fight drug test. They also announced that Croom's victory was overturned to a no contest due to the violation. He was fined $1,800 and before he is re-licensed in Las Vegas, Croom will also have to pay a prosecution fee of $145.36.

== See also ==
- List of UFC events
- List of current UFC fighters
- 2020 in UFC
