= Roosevelt Roberts =

American mixed martial arts fighter

- Born: Roosevelt Roberts; February 11, 1994 (age 32); Miami, Florida, United States
- Other names: The Predator
- Height: 6 ft 1 in (185 cm)
- Weight: 158 lb (72 kg; 11 st 4 lb)
- Division: Lightweight
- Reach: 73 in (185 cm)
- Fighting out of: San Bernardino, California, United States
- Team: Adrenaline MMA; Cortez Martial Arts; Carlson Gracie Temecula
- Rank: Brown belt in Brazilian Jiu-Jitsu
- Years active: 2016–present

Mixed martial arts record
- Total: 18
- Wins: 12
- By knockout: 4
- By submission: 5
- By decision: 3
- Losses: 5
- By knockout: 1
- By submission: 2
- By decision: 2
- No contests: 1

Other information
- Mixed martial arts record from Sherdog

Roosevelt Roberts (born February 11, 1994) is an American mixed martial artist (MMA) who competed in the Lightweight division in the Ultimate Fighting Championship (UFC).

== Background ==
Roberts was born in Miami, Florida in 1994. After his mother left the family due to domestic violence, Roberts began living with friends and family members whenever they could take him in. Roberts began selling drugs and stealing to support himself. As a result, he ended up in a youth correctional facility in San Francisco, California for a year. Roberts started to turn his life around at 19 years old when his daughter was born and started training in MMA. He took his first amateur fight in 2014 and turned professional in 2016. Roberts trains at Adrenaline MMA in San Bernardino under head coach Adam Rothwieler and at Carlson Gracie Temecula under Brazilian jiu-jitsu coach Tom Cronin.

== Mixed martial arts career ==
=== Early career and appearance on Dana White's Contender Series ===
After a 6–1 amateur career, Roberts started his professional MMA career in 2016. He amassed a record of 5–0 prior to his appearance on Dana White's Contender Series 15 web-series program on July 21, 2018, where he faced Garrett Gross. He won the fight via a submission in the second round and was signed by UFC.

=== Ultimate Fighting Championship ===
Roberts made his UFC debut on November 20, 2018, against Darrell Horcher at The Ultimate Fighter 28 Finale. He won the fight via a guillotine choke in round one. This win earned the Performance of the Night award.

His next fight came on April 27, 2019, against Thomas Gifford at UFC Fight Night: Jacaré vs. Hermansson. He won the fight via unanimous decision.

Roberts faced Vinc Pichel on June 29, 2019, at UFC on ESPN 3. He lost the fight via unanimous decision.

Roberts faced Alexander Yakovlev on November 9, 2019, at UFC on ESPN+ 21. He won the fight via unanimous decision.

Roberts was scheduled to face Matt Frevola on April 25, 2020. However, on April 9, promotional officials scrapped the pairing due to COVID-19 pandemic.

Roberts faced Brok Weaver on May 30, 2020, at UFC on ESPN: Woodley vs. Burns. At the weigh-ins, Weaver weighed in at 157.5 pounds, 1.5 pounds over the lightweight non-title fight limit of 156 pounds. He was fined 20 percent of his purse and the bout with Roberts proceeded at a catchweight. Roberts won the fight via submission in round two.

Roberts faced Jim Miller on June 20, 2020, at UFC Fight Night: Blaydes vs. Volkov. He lost the fight in the first round after verbally submitting to an armbar.

A bout with Matt Frevola was rescheduled and is expected to take place on September 12, 2020, at UFC Fight Night 177. On September 11, 2020, Frevola pulled out of the bout against Roberts, citing an injury. He was replaced by newcomer Kevin Croom. Roberts lost the fight via a guillotine choke in round one. On November 4, it was announced by the Nevada State Athletic Commission (NSAC) that the fight with Croom would be overturned to a no contest, after Croom tested positive for marijuana.

Roberts faced Ignacio Bahamondes on August 21, 2021, at UFC on ESPN 29. He lost the fight via knock out in round three.

On September 17, 2021, it was announced that Roberts was released by the UFC.

=== Eagle FC ===
After being released from the UFC, Roberts faced Darren Smith Jr. for the vacant LXF Welterweight Championship at Lights Out Xtreme Fighting 7 on December 10, 2021. He claimed the title via first-minute knockout.

Roberts faced Alexandre de Almeida on May 20, 2022, at Eagle FC 47. At weigh ins, Alexandre Almeida missed weight for the bout. Alexandre Almeida weighed in at 158.4 pounds and was fined a percentage of his purse and the bout proceeded at catchweight. He won the fight via unanimous decision.

=== The Ultimate Fighter 31 ===
In mid-March 2023, it was announced that Roberts would be competing in the thirty-first season of The Ultimate Fighter.

Roberts was selected to be a part of Team Chandler, being ranked third overall. In his first fight on the show, Roberts faced #2 ranked Nate Jennerman, and won the fight by knockout eight seconds into the first round.

In the semi-final round, Roberts faced former LFA Lightweight Champion and teammate Austin Hubbard, and lost the fight via split decistion.

==== Return to UFC ====
Roberts faced Mateusz Rębecki on November 11, 2023, at UFC 295. At the weigh-ins, Roberts came in at 158 pounds (two pounds over the lightweight non-title bout limit). His bout with Rebecki proceeded at catchweight with Roberts forfeiting 20% of his purse. He lost the bout in the first round via an armbar submission.

Replacing Nikolas Motta, Roberts faced Ľudovít Klein on September 28, 2024, at UFC Fight Night 243. He lost the fight by unanimous decision.

On February 28, 2025, it was reported that Roberts was once again removed from the UFC roster.

== Personal life ==
Roosevelt has two children.

== Championships and accomplishments ==
- Ultimate Fighting Championship
  - Performance of the Night (One time) vs. Darrell Horcher
- Lights Out Xtreme Fighting
  - LOXF Welterweight Championship (one time)

== Mixed martial arts record ==
Professional record breakdown
18 matches	12 wins	5 losses
By knockout	4	1
By submission	5	2
By decision	3	2
No contests	1	

Res.	Record	Opponent	Method	Event	Date	Round	Time	Location	Notes
Loss	12–5 (1)	Ľudovít Klein	Decision (Unanimous)	UFC Fight Night: Moicano vs. Saint Denis	September 28, 2024	3	5:00	Paris, France	
Loss	12–4 (1)	Mateusz Rębecki	Submission (armbar)	UFC 295	November 11, 2023	1	3:08	New York City, New York, United States	Catchweight (158 lb) bout; Roberts missed weight.
Win	12–3 (1)	Alexandre de Almeida	Decision (unanimous)	Eagle FC 47	May 20, 2022	3	5:00	Miami, Florida, United States	Return to Lightweight; de Almeida missed weight (158.4 lb).
Win	11–3 (1)	Darren Smith Jr.	KO (punch)	LXF 7	December 10, 2021	1	0:32	Commerce, California, United States	Won the vacant LOXF Welterweight Championship.
Loss	10–3 (1)	Ignacio Bahamondes	KO (spinning wheel kick)	UFC on ESPN: Cannonier vs. Gastelum	August 21, 2021	3	4:55	Las Vegas, Nevada, United States	
NC	10–2 (1)	Kevin Croom	NC (overturned)	UFC Fight Night: Waterson vs. Hill	September 12, 2020	1	0:31	Las Vegas, Nevada, United States	Originally a submission (guillotine choke) win for Croom; overturned after he tested positive for marijuana.
Loss	10–2	Jim Miller	Submission (armbar)	UFC on ESPN: Blaydes vs. Volkov	June 20, 2020	1	2:25	Las Vegas, Nevada, United States	Catchweight (160 lb) bout.
Win	10–1	Brok Weaver	Submission (rear-naked choke)	UFC on ESPN: Woodley vs. Burns	May 30, 2020	2	3:26	Las Vegas, Nevada, United States	Catchweight (157.5 lb) bout; Weaver missed weight.
Win	9–1	Alexander Yakovlev	Decision (unanimous)	UFC Fight Night: Magomedsharipov vs. Kattar	November 9, 2019	3	5:00	Moscow, Russia	
Loss	8–1	Vinc Pichel	Decision (unanimous)	UFC on ESPN: Ngannou vs. dos Santos	June 29, 2019	3	5:00	Minneapolis, Minnesota, United States	
Win	8–0	Thomas Gifford	Decision (unanimous)	UFC Fight Night: Jacaré vs. Hermansson	April 27, 2019	3	5:00	Sunrise, Florida, United States	
Win	7–0	Darrell Horcher	Submission (guillotine choke)	The Ultimate Fighter: Heavy Hitters Finale	November 30, 2018	1	4:50	Las Vegas, Nevada, United States	Performance of the Night.
Win	6–0	Garrett Gross	Submission (rear-naked choke)	Dana White's Contender Series 15	July 31, 2018	2	2:13	Las Vegas, Nevada, United States	
Win	5–0	Tommy Aaron	TKO (punches)	Bellator 192	January 20, 2018	1	N/A	Inglewood, California, United States	
Win	4–0	Shohei Yamamoto	TKO (punches)	CXF 9	August 19, 2017	2	1:47	Studio City, California, United States	Won the interim CXF Lightweight Championship.
Win	3–0	Dominic Clark	Submission (guillotine choke)	CXF 8	June 17, 2017	1	1:47	Burbank, California, United States	
Win	2–0	Andrew Kauppila	TKO (punches)	KOTC: Groundbreaking	May 6, 2017	1	0:23	San Jacinto, California, United States	
Win	1–0	Michael Thomas	Submission (guillotine choke)	California Fight League 9	October 22, 2016	1	2:58	Victorville, California, United States	Lightweight debut.

== Mixed martial arts exhibition record ==
Exhibition record breakdown		
2 matches	1 win	1 loss
By knockout	1	0
By decision	0	1

Res.	Record	Opponent	Method	Event	Date	Round	Time	Location	Notes
Loss	1–1	Austin Hubbard	Decision (split)	The Ultimate Fighter: Team McGregor vs. Team Chandler	Jul 25, 2023 (airdate)	3	5:00	Las Vegas, Nevada, United States	The Ultimate Fighter 31 Semi-final round.
Win	1–0	Nate Jennerman	TKO (punches)	The Ultimate Fighter: Team McGregor vs. Team Chandler	May 30, 2023 (airdate)	1	0:09	Las Vegas, Nevada, United States	The Ultimate Fighter 31 Quarterfinal round.

== See also ==
- List of male mixed martial artists
