= Matt Frevola =

American mixed martial arts fighter

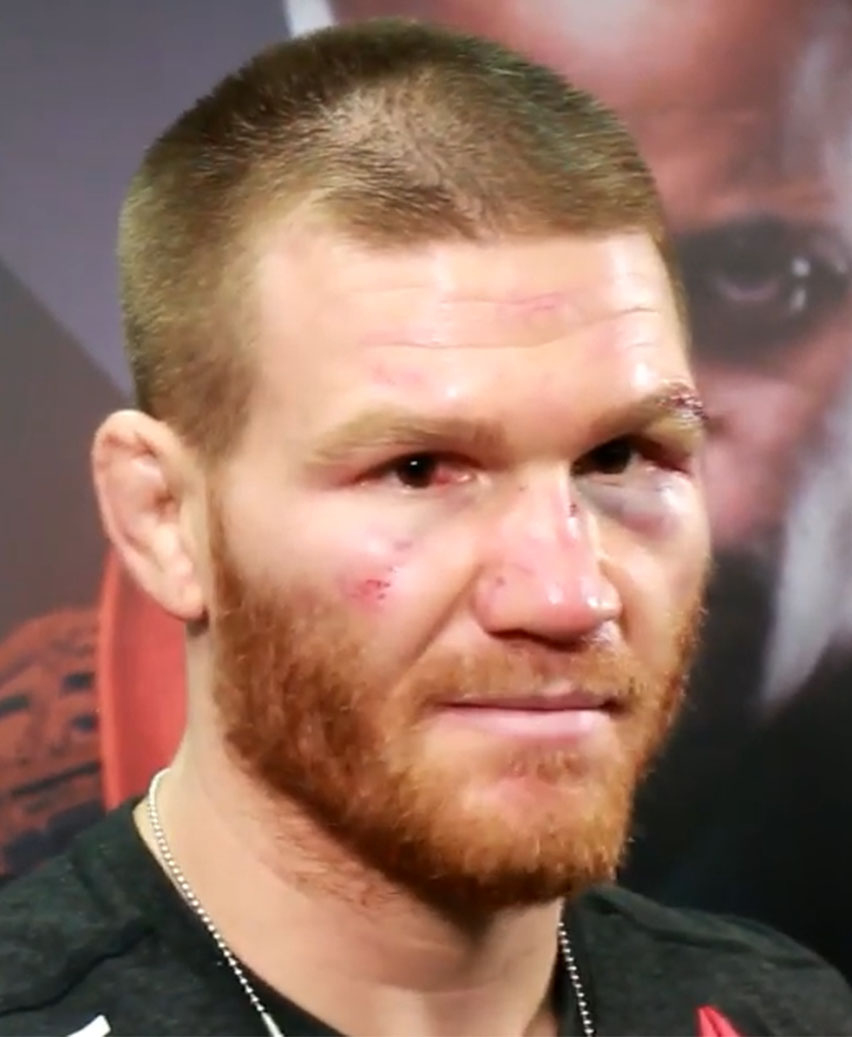
- Matt Frevola - post fight interview at UFC 230
- Born: Matthew Kenneth Frevola; June 11, 1990 (age 36); Huntington, New York, U.S.
- Other names: The Steamrolla
- Height: 5 ft 9 in (1.75 m)
- Weight: 155 lb (70 kg; 11.1 st)
- Division: Lightweight
- Reach: 71 in (180 cm)
- Fighting out of: Huntington, New York, U.S.
- Team: Serra-Longo Fight Team (2017–present); Gracie Tampa South (2010–present)
- Trainer: Matt Serra; Ray Longo
- Rank: Brown belt in Brazilian Jiu-Jitsu under Matt Arroyo
- Years active: 2014–present

Mixed martial arts record
- Total: 18
- Wins: 11
- By knockout: 4
- By submission: 3
- By decision: 4
- Losses: 6
- By knockout: 4
- By decision: 2
- Draws: 1

Other information
- University: University of Tampa
- Mixed martial arts record from Sherdog

Matthew Kenneth Frevola (born June 11, 1990) is an American professional mixed martial artist currently competing in the Lightweight division of the Ultimate Fighting Championship (UFC). A professional since 2014, he has also competed for the World Series of Fighting and Titan FC.

== Background ==
Born and raised on Long Island, New York, Frevola began competing in sports from a young age; he played football, lacrosse, wrestling, and baseball. Frevola attended Harborfields High School, where he started wrestling and also picked up Brazilian jiu-jitsu during high school. Frevola then attended the Reserve Officers' Training Corps program of University of Tampa. Frevola is a lieutenant in the United States Army Reserve.

== Mixed martial arts career ==
=== Early career ===
Frevola compiled an undefeated amateur record of 8–0 from 2011 to 2014, when he made his professional debut. Winning his first five professional bouts, he was selected to compete on Dana White's Contender Series 8 on August 29, 2017. Frevola defeated 7–0 Jose Flores via second-round submission and was awarded a UFC contract.

=== Ultimate Fighting Championship ===
Frevola made his promotional debut against Polo Reyes at UFC Fight Night: Stephens vs. Choi on January 14, 2018. He lost via first-round knockout.

Frevola faced Lando Vannata on November 3, 2018, at UFC 230. The bout ended in a majority draw.

Frevola faced Jalin Turner on April 13, 2019 at UFC 236. He won the fight by unanimous decision.

As the first fight of his four-fight contract, Frevola faced Luis Peña on October 12, 2019, at UFC Fight Night 161. He won the fight via split decision.

Frevola was expected to face Roosevelt Roberts on April 25, 2020. However, on April 9, Dana White, the president of UFC announced that the event would be postponed to a future date. Instead, Frevola was set to face Frank Camacho on June 20, 2020, at UFC Fight Night: Blaydes vs. Volkov, however, on June 18, it was revealed that Frevola was pulled from the bout after one of his cornermen tested positive for COVID-19.

A bout with Roosevelt Roberts was rescheduled for UFC Fight Night 177 on September 12, 2020. However, Frevola pulled out of the bout against Roberts on September 11, 2020, citing an injury. He was replaced by newcomer Kevin Croom.

Frevola was expected to face Ottman Azaitar on January 24, 2021, at UFC 257. However, on the day of the weigh-ins it was announced that Azaitar was pulled from the bout after it was determined that he had violated COVID-19 health and safety protocols. In turn, Azaitar was removed from the UFC's designated safety zone on Yas Island and released from the promotion. As a result, the promotion negotiated a matchup between Frevola and Arman Tsarukyan (whose original opponent had also been removed from the card) to keep both fighters on the card. Subsequently, Tsarukyan forfeited 20% of his purse as a result of missing weight, which went to Frevola. Frevola lost the fight via unanimous decision.

Frevola was again scheduled to face Frank Camacho on June 12, 2021, at UFC 263. However, Camacho pulled out of the fight during the week leading up to the event after he was involved in a traffic accident in Orange County, California that left him with non-life threatening injuries to his back and neck. In turn, Frevola faced promotional newcomer Terrance McKinney instead. Frevola lost the fight via knockout 7 seconds into the first round.

For the last fight of his prevailing contract, Frevola faced Genaro Valdéz on January 22, 2022, at UFC 270. After knocking down Valdéz multiple times, Frevola won the fight via technical knockout in round one.

The bout between Frevola and Ottman Azaitar was rescheduled for November 12, 2022 at UFC 281. He won the fight via knockout in the first round.

Frevola faced Drew Dober on May 6, 2023, at UFC 288. He won the fight by TKO at the end of the first round. This win earned him the Performance of the Night award.

Frevola faced Benoît Saint-Denis on November 11, 2023 at UFC 295. He lost the fight via knockout in the first round.

Frevola faced Farès Ziam on September 28, 2024 at UFC Fight Night 243. He lost the fight by knockout in the third round after taking a knee to the face.

Frevola faced Kyle Nelson on October 18, 2025, at UFC Fight Night 262. He lost the fight via unanimous decision.

== Personal life ==
Frevola graduated from University of Tampa with a bachelor's degree in Criminology. Frevola is a member of the United States Army Reserves as an Engineer Officer.

== Championships and accomplishments ==
- Ultimate Fighting Championship
  - Performance of the Night (One time) vs. Drew Dober

== Mixed martial arts record ==
Professional record breakdown
18 matches	11 wins	6 losses
By knockout	4	4
By submission	3	0
By decision	4	2
Draws	1	

Res.	Record	Opponent	Method	Event	Date	Round	Time	Location	Notes
Loss	11–6–1	Kyle Nelson	Decision (unanimous)	UFC Fight Night: de Ridder vs. Allen	October 18, 2025	3	5:00	Vancouver, British Columbia, Canada	
Loss	11–5–1	Farès Ziam	KO (knee)	UFC Fight Night: Moicano vs. Saint Denis	September 28, 2024	3	2:59	Paris, France	
Loss	11–4–1	Benoît Saint-Denis	KO (head kick)	UFC 295	November 11, 2023	1	1:31	New York City, New York, United States	
Win	11–3–1	Drew Dober	TKO (punches)	UFC 288	May 6, 2023	1	4:08	Newark, New Jersey, United States	Performance of the Night.
Win	10–3–1	Ottman Azaitar	KO (punch)	UFC 281	November 12, 2022	1	2:30	New York City, New York, United States	
Win	9–3–1	Genaro Valdéz	TKO (punches)	UFC 270	January 22, 2022	1	3:15	Anaheim, California, United States	
Loss	8–3–1	Terrance McKinney	KO (punches)	UFC 263	June 12, 2021	1	0:07	Glendale, Arizona, United States	
Loss	8–2–1	Arman Tsarukyan	Decision (unanimous)	UFC 257	January 24, 2021	3	5:00	Abu Dhabi, United Arab Emirates	Catchweight (157 lb) bout; Tsarukyan missed weight.
Win	8–1–1	Luis Peña	Decision (split)	UFC Fight Night: Joanna vs. Waterson	October 12, 2019	3	5:00	Tampa, Florida, United States	
Win	7–1–1	Jalin Turner	Decision (unanimous)	UFC 236	April 13, 2019	3	5:00	Atlanta, Georgia, United States	
Draw	6–1–1	Lando Vannata	Draw (majority)	UFC 230	November 3, 2018	3	5:00	New York City, New York, United States	
Loss	6–1	Polo Reyes	KO (punches)	UFC Fight Night: Stephens vs. Choi	January 14, 2018	1	1:00	St. Louis, Missouri, United States	
Win	6–0	Jose Flores	Submission (arm-triangle choke)	Dana White's Contender Series 8	August 29, 2017	2	3:32	Las Vegas, Nevada, United States	
Win	5–0	Raush Manfio	Decision (unanimous)	Titan FC 43	January 21, 2017	3	5:00	Coral Gables, Florida, United States	
Win	4–0	Trent McDade	Submission (guillotine choke)	Real FC 37	July 22, 2016	1	0:55	Tampa, Florida, United States	
Win	3–0	Emmanuel Ramirez	Decision (unanimous)	Absolute FC 25	April 1, 2016	3	5:00	Coconut Creek, Florida, United States	Catchweight (165 lb) bout.
Win	2–0	Mike D'Angelo	KO (punch)	Real FC 35	November 13, 2015	1	2:46	Tampa, Florida, United States	
Win	1–0	Josh Zuckerman	Submission (triangle armbar)	WSOF 15	November 15, 2014	1	2:50	Tampa, Florida, United States	Lightweight debut.
