= Ottman Azaitar =

German mixed martial artist

- Born: February 20, 1990 (age 36); Cologne, West Germany
- Other names: The Bulldozer
- Height: 5 ft 7 in (170 cm)
- Weight: 156 lb (71 kg; 11 st 2 lb)
- Division: Lightweight
- Reach: 71 in (180 cm)
- Fighting out of: Rabat, Morocco
- Team: Team Morocco
- Years active: 2014–present

Mixed martial arts record
- Total: 16
- Wins: 13
- By knockout: 10
- By submission: 2
- By decision: 1
- Losses: 3
- By knockout: 3

Other information
- Mixed martial arts record from Sherdog

Ottman Azaitar (born February 20, 1990) is a German mixed martial artist who currently competes in the Lightweight division of the Ultimate Fighting Championship. He is the younger brother of UFC fighter Abu Azaitar.

== Background ==
Ottman Azaitar was born to a Moroccan family in Cologne, West Germany. Azaitar grew up in the Dellbrück district of Cologne until he moved with his family to Weiden. He attended the King Fahd Academy in Bonn until the age of 15 where he was raised with traditional Islamic upbringings. The controversial school, which shut down in 2017 of its own accord, was funded by the Saudi government and suspected of “attracting Islamists to Germany.” At the academy, all school subjects were taught exclusively in Arabic. This unusual school career initially had a negative impact on his German language skills, which became noticeable when he moved to the Hildegard of Bingen Gymnasium in Cologne. However, the initial language difficulties were overcome, and he left the high school after graduating in 2012 with a grade point average of 1.9. After graduating from high school, he took up studies in business administration.

He began his sports career as a six-year-old boy. Until the age of ten, he learned the techniques of jiu-jitsu. He then switched to boxing, Muay Thai and kickboxing, in which he also won several important titles until 2012. These include his title as champion in Muay Thai of the state of North Rhine-Westphalia in 2011 and the following year as German champion in Muay Thai. At the same time, Azaitar joined the German national Muay Thai team and participated in the world championship in Saint Petersburg on May 19–28, 2012.

== Controversies ==
=== Criminal proceedings involving family members ===
Ottman Azaitar has faced criticism in connection with criminal proceedings involving his family. German media have associated him with incidents involving his brothers, Abubakr "Abu" Azaitar and Omar Azaitar.

A report by the Kölnische Rundschau described that the three brothers came into conflict with the justice system as juveniles due to dangerous bodily harm and other offenses. On January 24, 2006, Ottman appeared in court as part of a group that had brutally beaten a man; his proceedings for dangerous bodily harm were severed from the main case at that time.

His brother Abubakr Azaitar was convicted of multiple violent offenses. These included a 2003 assault on a businessman, in which the victim was doused with a fire starter, threatened with death, and had his Ferrari stolen (resulting in a sentence of two years and three months imprisonment). He was also convicted of assaulting his then-girlfriend at a Christmas market in Wuppertal, causing injury to her eardrum. Omar Azaitar was also convicted in this context of dangerous bodily harm and attempted coercion, receiving a suspended sentence. Additionally, the brothers were finally convicted in 2005 of aggravated gang theft in 14 cases.

=== UFC dismissal for security protocol violations ===
Azaitar gained international attention in 2021 following his dismissal from the Ultimate Fighting Championship (UFC). The dismissal was due to a serious violation of COVID-19 safety protocols on "Fight Island" in Abu Dhabi. Azaitar and his team removed their identification wristbands and gave them to outsiders, allowing an unauthorized person to enter his hotel room and deliver a bag to him. His scheduled fight was subsequently canceled. His brother, Abu Azaitar, who was also signed to the UFC, received a seven-month suspension for violating anti-doping policies. The United States Anti-Doping Agency (USADA) announced that Azaitar, then 34, tested positive for tamoxifen and/or its metabolite 3-hydroxy-4-methoxy-tamoxifen in urine samples collected on August 25, September 4, September 9, and September 17, 2020. Tamoxifen is classified as a Specified Substance in the class of Hormone and Metabolic Modulators and is prohibited at all times under the UFC Anti-Doping Policy. Although Azaitar provided evidence that the substance was prescribed by a physician, he lacked a valid Therapeutic Use Exemption (TUE), and his application for a retroactive TUE was denied due to insufficient medical justification. The sanction was reduced from the standard one-year ban to seven months based on his cooperation and the specific circumstances of the case.

=== Media criticism and ties to the Moroccan royal house ===
Azaitar, along with his brothers (including MMA fighter Abu Azaitar), has repeatedly faced criticism from Moroccan and international media due to his close connection to King Mohammed VI of Morocco. Media reports, including those from Hespress and The Economist, have accused the brothers of exploiting their proximity to the monarch for business advantages and to display a luxurious lifestyle, while the country struggled with social and economic problems.

Critical articles have partially described the brothers as "notorious crooks" with a "Rasputin-like influence" on the King. Coverage also highlighted Abubakr Azaitar's past convictions for assault and gang theft in Germany, as well as the family's conspicuous lifestyle, which stands in stark contrast to the economic situation of many Moroccans. The royal house has not officially commented on the allegations.

== Mixed martial arts career ==
=== Early career ===
Starting his career in 2014, Ottman fought mainly in regional German promotions and then later joined Brave Combat Federation. While in BRAVE, in his third fight for the organization, at BRAVE CF 9 on November 17, 2017, in Bahrain, he won the BRAVE Combat Federation Lightweight Championship against Alejandro Martinez via 3rd-round TKO. In his next fight, he fought Danijel Kokora in a welterweight non-title bout, picking up a 31-second KO. He was later stripped of the Lightweight Championship after refusing to defend it in a timely manner, with Mohammed Shahid, the President of Brave CF, releasing the following statement:

“Ottman Azaitar has had a great career with Brave Combat Federation, fighting a really good fight in Morocco which was not for the title. If you look at the lightweight division today, we have not had a title defense for nearly a year at this point. Of course, this is very unfair to the division as a whole, and we have to make a decision on that. We are confirming right now; November in Bahrain, we will have a lightweight title fight. And we’ve been working to make that fight happen for a while now. If we don't have that caliber of fighters, the one is willing to fight against the best in the world, that fighter doesn't have a place here at Brave, To make it official; we have stripped Ottman Azaitar of the lightweight title. We will have a match for the vacant title during the Brave International fight Week in November. The most important thing here, the message, is to make sure that we have athletes who actively want to fight the best in the world – especially as champion.”

=== Ultimate Fighting Championship ===
Azaitar signed with the Ultimate Fighting Championship in late 2018, becoming the second Moroccan UFC Fighter after his older brother Abu Azaitar. in On September 7, 2019, Ottman made his UFC debut at UFC 242 against Teemu Packalén. He won the fight via knockout in the first round. This fight earned him his first Performance of the Night award.

A bout between Azaitar and Khama Worthy was previously scheduled to take place at UFC 249. However, the event was cancelled in early April due to the COVID-19 pandemic. The fight was then rescheduled to UFC Fight Night: Overeem vs. Sakai. In turn, the pair was removed from that event due to undisclosed reasons and moved to UFC Fight Night: Waterson vs. Hill Azaitar went on to win the fight via technical knockout in the first round. This fight earned him the Performance of the Night award.

On November 21, 2020, it was announced that Azaitar was scheduled to fight against Matt Frevola on January 24, 2021 at UFC 257. However, on the day of the weigh-ins, it was announced that Azaitar withdrew from the bout. It was later announced that Ottman had broken safety protocols, and Dana White released the following statement on the matter:

“He and his team cut their wristbands off and got them to people on the outside, one guy, This guy got inside the bubble, went in through a room, shimmied down four balconies, went in through (Azaitar's) balcony, and dropped off a bag of we don't know what. Then he changed his clothes and went back outside of the bubble. We got everything on camera, we saw the whole thing, and how it all went down, pulled his fight and cut him.”

As the result of the breach in COVID-19 safety protocols, Azaitar was released from UFC on January 23, 2021. However, one month later, UFC decided to reverse the decision after taking a strong stand of their initial decision, UFC reinstated Azaitar stating to give Azaitar the “second chance”.

After almost two years away from the octagon, the bout between Azaitar and Matt Frevola was rescheduled for November 12, 2022 at UFC 281. He lost the fight via knockout in the first round.

Azaitar faced Francisco Prado on July 15, 2023, at UFC Vegas 77. He lost the fight via TKO in the first round.

Azaitar was scheduled to face Darrius Flowers on November 18, 2023, at UFC Fight Night 232. The bout was cancelled for unknown reasons.

Azaitar faced Michael Johnson on December 14, 2024, at UFC on ESPN 63. He lost the fight by knockout in the second round, leading to his third consecutive loss by knockout.

== Championships and accomplishments ==
- Ultimate Fighting Championship
  - Performance of the Night (Two time) vs. Teemu Packalén and Khama Worthy
- Brave Combat Federation
  - BRAVE Combat Federation Lightweight Championship (One time)

== Mixed martial arts record ==
Professional record breakdown
16 matches	13 wins	3 losses
By knockout	10	3
By submission	2	0
By decision	1	0

Res.	Record	Opponent	Method	Event	Date	Round	Time	Location	Notes
Loss	13–3	Michael Johnson	KO (punch)	UFC on ESPN: Covington vs. Buckley	December 14, 2024	2	2:03	Tampa, Florida, United States	
Loss	13–2	Francisco Prado	TKO (punches)	UFC on ESPN: Holm vs. Bueno Silva	July 15, 2023	1	4:05	Las Vegas, Nevada, United States	
Loss	13–1	Matt Frevola	KO (punch)	UFC 281	November 12, 2022	1	2:30	New York City, New York, United States	
Win	13–0	Khama Worthy	TKO (punches)	UFC Fight Night: Waterson vs. Hill	September 12, 2020	1	1:33	Las Vegas, Nevada, United States	Performance of the Night.
Win	12–0	Teemu Packalén	KO (punch)	UFC 242	September 7, 2019	1	3:35	Abu Dhabi, United Arab Emirates	Performance of the Night.
Win	11–0	Danijel Kokora	KO (punch)	Brave CF 14	August 18, 2018	1	0:32	Tangier, Morocco	Welterweight bout.
Win	10–0	Alejandro Martinez	TKO (punches)	Brave CF 9	November 17, 2017	3	1:16	Isa Town, Bahrain	Won the inaugural Brave CF Lightweight Championship.
Win	9–0	Charlie Leary	TKO (punches)	Brave FC 4	March 31, 2017	1	2:22	Abu Dhabi, United Arab Emirates	Lightweight debut.
Win	8–0	Kevin Koldobsky	Decision (unanimous)	Brave FC 2	December 2, 2016	3	5:00	Isa Town, Bahrain	
Win	7–0	Łukasz Szczerek	TKO (punches)	GMC 8	April 16, 2016	1	0:56	Castrop-Rauxel, Germany	
Win	6–0	Ramūnas Paliunis	TKO (punches)	Fair FC 4	November 28, 2015	1	1:16	Eindhoven, Netherlands	
Win	5–0	Christoph Hector	Submission (guillotine choke)	Mix Fight Gala 18	June 5, 2015	1	2:57	Fulda, Germany	
Win	4–0	Serge Dali	Submission (rear naked choke)	GMC 6	April 18, 2015	1	3:30	Castrop-Rauxel, Germany	
Win	3–0	Ilbey Akdas	KO (punch)	Fair FC 3	March 25, 2015	1	0:14	Rheinberg, Germany	
Win	2–0	Alexander Vogt	TKO (submission to punches)	Fair FC 2	November 1, 2014	2	4:01	Herne, Germany	
Win	1–0	Patrick Talmon	TKO (punches)	Showdown Fight Night 1	June 7, 2014	1	0:19	Mannheim, Germany	Welterweight debut.

== See also ==
- List of current UFC fighters
- List of male mixed martial artists
