= UFC 295 =

Mixed martial arts event in 2023

UFC 295: Procházka vs. Pereira
- The poster for UFC 295: Procházka vs. Pereira
- Promotion: Ultimate Fighting Championship
- Date: November 11, 2023
- Venue: Madison Square Garden
- City: New York City, United States
- Attendance: 19,039
- Total gate: $12,432,563

Event chronology
UFC Fight Night: Almeida vs. Lewis	UFC 295: Procházka vs. Pereira	UFC Fight Night: Allen vs. Craig

UFC 295: Procházka vs. Pereira was a mixed martial arts event produced by the Ultimate Fighting Championship that took place on November 11, 2023, at the Madison Square Garden in New York City.

== Background ==
The event marked the promotion's tenth visit to New York City and first since UFC 281 in November 2022.

A UFC Heavyweight Championship bout between champion at the time (also former two-time UFC Light Heavyweight Champion) Jon Jones and former two-time champion Stipe Miocic was expected to headline the event. However on October 25, it was announced that the bout was scrapped after Jones sustained a pectoral muscle injury that would require surgery. As a result, the promotion opted to book an interim title bout between the originally scheduled backup fighter Sergei Pavlovich and Tom Aspinall in the co-main event.

A UFC Light Heavyweight Championship bout for the vacant title between former champion Jiří Procházka (also the inaugural Rizin Light Heavyweight Champion) and former UFC Middleweight Champion Alex Pereira (also former Glory Middleweight and Light Heavyweight Champion) was originally expected to serve as the co-headliner, but instead served as the main event after the previous one was cancelled. Former champion Jamahal Hill vacated the title after he ruptured his Achilles tendon.

A flyweight bout between Joshua Van and Kevin Borjas took place at the event. The pairing was previously scheduled to meet at Dana White's Contender Series 57, but Van was pulled in order to face Zhalgas Zhumagulov at UFC on ABC: Emmett vs. Topuria.

A middleweight bout between Derek Brunson and Roman Dolidze was set to take place at the event. However, Brunson parted ways with the organization and the bout was scrapped.

A flyweight bout between Matt Schnell and Steve Erceg was expected to take place at the event. However, Schnell withdrew from the bout for unknown reasons and was replaced by Alessandro Costa.

A lightweight bout between Mateusz Rębecki and Nurullo Aliev was scheduled for the event. However, Aliev withdrew from the event in early November due to injury. He was replaced by returning veteran Roosevelt Roberts. At the weigh-ins, Roberts came in at 158 pounds (two pounds over the lightweight non-title bout limit). His bout with Rebecki proceeded at catchweight with Roberts forfeiting 20% of his purse.

At the weigh-ins, Jamall Emmers came in at 147 pounds (one pound over the featherweight non-title bout limit). His bout with Dennis Buzukja proceeded at catchweight with Emmers forfeiting 20% of his purse.

== Results ==
Main card
Weight class				Method	Round	Time	Notes
Light Heavyweight	Alex Pereira	def.	Jiří Procházka	TKO (elbows)	2	4:08	(Note: For the vacant UFC Light Heavyweight Championship.)
Heavyweight	Tom Aspinall	def.	Sergei Pavlovich	KO (punches)	1	1:09	(Note: For the interim UFC Heavyweight Championship.)
Women's Strawweight	Jéssica Andrade	def.	Mackenzie Dern	TKO (punches)	2	3:15
Lightweight	Benoît Saint Denis	def.	Matt Frevola	KO (head kick)	1	1:31
Featherweight	Diego Lopes	def.	Pat Sabatini	KO (punches)	1	1:30
Preliminary card (ESPNews / ESPN+)
Flyweight	Steve Erceg	def.	Alessandro Costa	Decision (unanimous) (29–28, 29–28, 29–28)	3	5:00
Women's Strawweight	Loopy Godínez	def.	Tabatha Ricci	Decision (split) (27–30, 29–28, 29–28)	3	5:00
Catchweight (158 lb)	Mateusz Rębecki	def.	Roosevelt Roberts	Submission (armbar)	1	3:08
Lightweight	Nazim Sadykhov	vs.	Viacheslav Borshchev	Draw (majority) (28–29, 28–28, 28–28)	3	5:00
Early preliminary card (ESPN+ / UFC Fight Pass)
Lightweight	Jared Gordon	def.	Mark Madsen	TKO (elbow and punches)	1	4:42
Catchweight (138 lb)	John Castañeda	def.	Kang Kyung-ho	Decision (unanimous) (30–27, 30–27, 30–27)	3	5:00
Flyweight	Joshua Van	def.	Kevin Borjas	Decision (unanimous) (29–28, 29–28, 29–28)	3	5:00
Catchweight (147 lb)	Jamall Emmers	def.	Dennis Buzukja	TKO (punches)	1	0:49

== Bonus awards ==
The following fighters received $50,000 bonuses.

- Fight of the Night: Viacheslav Borshchev vs. Nazim Sadykhov
- Performance of the Night: Alex Pereira, Tom Aspinall, Jéssica Andrade, Benoît Saint-Denis, and Diego Lopes

== See also ==
- 2023 in UFC
- List of current UFC fighters
- List of UFC events
