= Billy Quarantillo =

American mixed martial arts fighter

- Born: William Daniel Quarantillo; December 8, 1988 (age 37); Ransomville, New York, U.S.
- Height: 5 ft 10 in (1.78 m)
- Weight: 145 lb (66 kg; 10 st 5 lb)
- Division: Featherweight; Lightweight
- Reach: 70 in (178 cm)
- Fighting out of: Tampa, Florida, U.S.
- Team: Gracie Tampa South
- Rank: Black belt in Brazilian Jiu-Jitsu under Matt Arroyo
- Years active: 2013–present

Mixed martial arts record
- Total: 26
- Wins: 18
- By knockout: 8
- By submission: 5
- By decision: 5
- Losses: 8
- By knockout: 3
- By submission: 1
- By decision: 4

Other information
- Boxing record from BoxRec
- Mixed martial arts record from Sherdog

William Daniel “Billy” Quarantillo (born December 8, 1988) is an American mixed martial artist who currently competes in the Lightweight division of the Ultimate Fighting Championship. He was the former King of the Cage Lightweight Champion.

== Mixed martial arts career ==
=== Early career ===
Born in Ransomville, New York, and trained by way of his adopted hometown of Tampa, Quarantillo began his fighting tenure on the amateur circuit in July 2010. After the Gracie Tampa South representative posted an 8–2 mark through ten outings, he turned pro in 2013.

Quarantillo competed for various regional American organizations, in the process amassing a record of 11–2 and winning the King of the Cage Lightweight Championship and Strike Off Fighting Championships Featherweight Championship.

=== The Ultimate Fighter ===
Quarantillo also competed on The Ultimate Fighter: Team McGregor vs. Team Faber in 2015. In the preliminary fights, he defeated Brandon Ricetti via TKO in the second round to become a member of Team Faber. In his second bout, he lost to Saul Rogers via unanimous decision after two rounds.

=== Dana White's Contender Series ===
After earning 5 more wins and 1 loss on the regional circuit, Quarantillo eventually gained a second chance for a UFC contract on Dana White's Contender Series 21 on July 23, 2019. He successfully acquired a contract by defeating Kamuela Kirk via TKO in the third round.

=== Ultimate Fighting Championship ===
Quarantillo made his UFC debut against short notice opponent Jacob Kilburn at UFC on ESPN 7 on December 7, 2019. He won the fight with a second round submission via triangle choke.

Quarantillo next faced Spike Carlyle at UFC on ESPN 9 on May 30, 2020, in a catchweight bout. He won the bout via a unanimous decision.

In his third bout for the promotion, Quarantillo faced Kyle Nelson on September 12, 2020, at UFC Fight Night 177. He won the fight via knockout in round three.

Quarantillo faced Gavin Tucker on December 12, 2020, at UFC 256. He lost the fight via unanimous decision.

Quarantillo was scheduled to face Herbert Burns on July 17, 2021, at UFC on ESPN 26. However, Burns pulled out in early June due to undisclosed reasons and was replaced by Gabriel Benítez. Quarantillo knocked Benítez down early and eventually won the bout via technical knockout in round three. This win earned him the Fight of the Night award.

Quarantillo fought Shane Burgos on November 6, 2021, at UFC 268. He lost the fight by unanimous decision.

Quarantillo was scheduled to face Bill Algeo on July 16, 2022, at UFC on ABC 3. However, he pulled out due to injury.

Quarantillo faced Alexander Hernandez on December 10, 2022, at UFC 282. He won the fight via technical knockout in the second round. This win earned him the Performance of the Night award.

Quarantillo faced Edson Barboza at UFC on ESPN 44. He lost the fight via knockout in the first round.

Quarantillo faced Damon Jackson on August 5, 2023, at UFC Fight Night 226. He won the fight by unanimous decision.

Quarantillo was scheduled to face Gabriel Miranda on March 23, 2024, at UFC on ESPN 53 However, Miranda was replaced by Youssef Zalal for unknown reasons. He lost the fight via rear-naked choke in round two.

Quarantillo faced Cub Swanson on December 14, 2024 at UFC on ESPN 63. He lost the fight via a one-two punch knockout in the third round. This fight earned him another Fight of the Night award.

Quarantillo faced Carlos Diego Ferreira on August 8, 2026 at UFC Fight Night 284. He lost the fight by unanimous decision. This fight earned him a $100,000 Fight of the Night award.

== Personal life ==
Quarantillo's elder brother Austin passed away in July 2025 at the age of 37. On July 26, 2026, Quarantillo and wife Brianna welcomed their third son.

== Championships and accomplishments ==
- Ultimate Fighting Championship
  - Fight of the Night (Three times) Gabriel Benítez, Cub Swanson and Carlos Diego Ferreira
  - Performance of the Night (One time) Alexander Hernandez
- Strike Off Fighting Championships
  - Strike Off Fighting Championships Featherweight Champion (One time)
- King of the Cage
  - King of the Cage Lightweight Champion (One time)

== Mixed martial arts record ==
Professional record breakdown
26 matches	18 wins	8 losses
By knockout	8	3
By submission	5	1
By decision	5	4

Res.	Record	Opponent	Method	Event	Date	Round	Time	Location	Notes
Loss	18–8	Carlos Diego Ferreira	Decision (unanimous)	UFC Fight Night: Gamrot vs. Salkilld	August 8, 2026	3	5:00	Las Vegas, Nevada, United States	Return to Lightweight. Fight of the Night.
Loss	18–7	Cub Swanson	KO (punch)	UFC on ESPN: Covington vs. Buckley	December 14, 2024	3	1:36	Tampa, Florida, United States	Fight of the Night.
Loss	18–6	Youssef Zalal	Submission (rear-naked choke)	UFC on ESPN: Ribas vs. Namajunas	March 23, 2024	2	1:50	Las Vegas, Nevada, United States	
Win	18–5	Damon Jackson	Decision (unanimous)	UFC on ESPN: Sandhagen vs. Font	August 5, 2023	3	5:00	Nashville, Tennessee, United States	
Loss	17–5	Edson Barboza	KO (knee)	UFC on ESPN: Holloway vs. Allen	April 15, 2023	1	2:37	Kansas City, Missouri, United States	
Win	17–4	Alexander Hernandez	TKO (knees and punches)	UFC 282	December 10, 2022	2	4:30	Las Vegas, Nevada, United States	Performance of the Night.
Loss	16–4	Shane Burgos	Decision (unanimous)	UFC 268	November 6, 2021	3	5:00	New York City, New York, United States	
Win	16–3	Gabriel Benítez	TKO (punches)	UFC on ESPN: Makhachev vs. Moisés	July 17, 2021	3	3:40	Las Vegas, Nevada, United States	Fight of the Night.
Loss	15–3	Gavin Tucker	Decision (unanimous)	UFC 256	December 12, 2020	3	5:00	Las Vegas, Nevada, United States	
Win	15–2	Kyle Nelson	KO (punch)	UFC Fight Night: Waterson vs. Hill	September 12, 2020	3	0:07	Las Vegas, Nevada, United States	
Win	14–2	Spike Carlyle	Decision (unanimous)	UFC on ESPN: Woodley vs. Burns	May 30, 2020	3	5:00	Las Vegas, Nevada, United States	Catchweight (150 lb) bout.
Win	13–2	Jacob Kilburn	Submission (triangle choke)	UFC on ESPN: Overeem vs. Rozenstruik	December 7, 2019	2	3:18	Washington, D.C., United States	
Win	12–2	Kamuela Kirk	TKO (punches)	Dana White's Contender Series 21	July 23, 2019	3	0:22	Las Vegas, Nevada, United States	
Win	11–2	Adrian Vilaca	TKO (punches)	KOTC: Combat Zone	February 23, 2019	2	4:32	Niagara Falls, New York, United States	Return to Featherweight.
Win	10–2	Eric Reynolds	TKO (punches)	V3 Fights 61	August 19, 2017	1	1:00	Tampa, Florida, United States	
Win	9–2	Ryan Fillingame	TKO (retirement)	KOTC: Raw Deal	February 25, 2017	2	5:00	Niagara Falls, New York, United States	Won the KOTC Light Welterweight Championship.
Win	8–2	Matthew DiMarcantonio	Decision (unanimous)	KOTC: National Dispute	September 24, 2016	3	5:00	Niagara Falls, New York, United States	
Loss	7–2	Michel Quiñones	TKO (punches)	Absolute FC 25	April 1, 2016	1	2:51	Coconut Creek, Florida, United States	
Win	7–1	Marc Stevens	Decision (unanimous)	Absolute FC 24	January 29, 2016	3	5:00	Coconut Creek, Florida, United States	Lightweight bout.
Win	6–1	Khama Worthy	TKO (punches)	Strike Off 4	February 28, 2015	2	0:10	Annandale, Virginia, United States	Won the vacant SOFC Featherweight Championship.
Win	5–1	Terrell Hobbs	Submission (triangle choke)	Strike Off 2	September 27, 2014	3	2:13	Woodbridge, Virginia, United States	Featherweight debut.
Win	4–1	Isaac Figueroa	Submission (rear-naked choke)	Real FC 31	July 11, 2014	2	3:34	Tampa, Florida, United States	
Win	3–1	Sandro da Silva	Submission (armbar)	Strike Off 1	June 7, 2014	1	0:49	Woodbridge, Virginia, United States	Lightweight debut.
Loss	2–1	J.P. Reese	Decision (unanimous)	Real FC 29	November 8, 2013	3	5:00	Tampa, Florida, United States	Catchweight (160 lb) bout.
Win	2–0	Howard Reece	Submission (armbar)	Real FC 28	July 26, 2013	1	1:45	Tampa, Florida, United States	Catchweight (150 lb) bout.
Win	1–0	John de Jesus	Decision (split)	Fight Time 13: MMA Kings	February 15, 2013	3	5:00	Fort Lauderdale, Florida, United States	Catchweight (150 lb) bout.

Exhibition record breakdown		
2 matches	1 win	1 loss
By knockout	1	0
By decision	0	1

Res.	Record	Opponent	Method	Event	Date	Round	Time	Location	Notes
Loss	1–1	Saul Rogers	Decision (unanimous)	The Ultimate Fighter: Team McGregor vs. Team Faber	October 7, 2015 (air date)	2	5:00	Las Vegas, Nevada, United States	TUF 22 quarter-final round.
Win	1–0	Brandon Ricetti	TKO (punches)	The Ultimate Fighter: Team McGregor vs. Team Faber	September 9, 2015 (air date)	2	2:53	Las Vegas, Nevada, United States	TUF 22 preliminary round.

== Professional boxing record ==
1 fight	1 win	0 losses
By decision	1	0

No.	Result	Record	Opponent	Type	Round, time	Date	Location	Notes
1	Win	1–0	(United States) Curtis Waller	UD	4	5 October 2018	(United States) Bryan Glazer Family JCC Auditorium, Tampa, Florida, US	

== See also ==
- List of current UFC fighters
- List of Dana White's Contender Series alumni
- List of male mixed martial artists
