= Brok Weaver =

American mixed martial arts fighter

- Born: December 5, 1991 (age 34); Jackson, Alabama, U.S.
- Other names: Chata Tuska
- Height: 6 ft 0 in (1.83 m)
- Weight: 170 lb (77 kg; 12 st 2 lb)
- Division: Welterweight; Lightweight
- Reach: 73 in (185 cm)
- Fighting out of: McIntosh, Alabama, U.S.
- Team: Port City Kickboxing Academy
- Years active: 2013–present

Mixed martial arts record
- Total: 23
- Wins: 17
- By knockout: 3
- By submission: 3
- By decision: 9
- By disqualification: 2
- Losses: 6
- By knockout: 1
- By submission: 3
- By decision: 2

Other information
- Mixed martial arts record from Sherdog

Brok Weaver (born December 5, 1991) is an American mixed martial artist who competes in the Lightweight division of PFL. A professional since 2013, he has also competed in the Ultimate Fighting Championship.

== Mixed martial arts career ==
=== Early career ===
Making his debut in 2013, Weaver fought mostly for the Island Fights Promotion, amassing a 13–4 record and winning the Welterweight Championship. He eventually got a chance to compete on Dana White's Contender Series and earned his UFC contract through a second round TKO victory against Devin Smyth.

=== Ultimate Fighting Championship ===
Weaver made his UFC debut against Kazula Vargas at UFC Fight Night: Anderson vs. Błachowicz 2 on February 15, 2020. He won the fight via DQ when Vargas kneed Weaver in the head while he was a grounded opponent.

Weaver faced Roosevelt Roberts on May 30, 2020 at UFC on ESPN: Woodley vs. Burns. At the weigh-ins, Weaver weighed in at 157.5 pounds, 1.5 pounds over the lightweight non-title fight limit of 156 pounds. He was fined 20 percent of his purse and the bout with Roberts proceeded at a catchweight. Weaver lost the fight via submission in round two.

Brok was scheduled to face Frank Camacho during UFC Fight Night: Waterson vs. Hill on September 12, 2020. However, Camacho was removed from the bout during the week leading up to the fight after testing positive for COVID-19. Weaver instead faced Jalin Turner at a catchweight bout of 165 pounds. Weaver lost the fight via submission in the second round.

In March 2021, Brok announced that he was released from the UFC.

=== Post UFC ===
In his first bout after release, Brok faced Alexander Barahona at iKon Fighting Federation 6 on April 2, 2021. He won the bout via unanimous decision.

Weaver competed at the inaugural event of Jorge Masvidal's Gamebred Fighting Championship on June 18, 2021. He faced Cliff Wright, who he defeated via ground and pound in the second round.

=== Professional Fighters League ===
Weaver signed a two-year deal to fight with PFL. He was scheduled to make his PFL debut on August 27, 2021 at PFL 9 against Brandon Jenkins. The fight did not happen and Weaver has been inactive ever since.

== Personal life ==
Weaver is a member of the MOWA Band of Choctaw Indians.

In October 2021 he became a deputy sheriff for Clarke County.

== Mixed martial arts record ==
Professional record breakdown
| 23 matches | 17 wins | 6 losses |
| By knockout | 3 | 1 |
| By submission | 3 | 3 |
| By decision | 9 | 2 |
| By disqualification | 2 | 0 |

| Res. | Record | Opponent | Method | Event | Date | Round | Time | Location | Notes |
|---|---|---|---|---|---|---|---|---|---|
| Win | 17–6 | Cliff Wright | TKO (punches) | Gamebred Fighting Championships 1 | June 19, 2021 | 2 | 2:38 | Biloxi, Mississippi, United States | Bare Knuckle MMA. |
| Win | 16–6 | Alexander Barahona | Decision (unanimous) | iKon Fighting Federation 6 | April 2, 2021 | 3 | 5:00 | Los Mochis, Mexico | |
| Loss | 15–6 | Jalin Turner | Submission (rear-naked choke) | UFC Fight Night: Waterson vs. Hill | September 12, 2020 | 2 | 4:20 | Las Vegas, Nevada, United States | Catchweight (165 lbs) bout. |
| Loss | 15–5 | Roosevelt Roberts | Submission (rear-naked choke) | UFC on ESPN: Woodley vs. Burns | May 30, 2020 | 2 | 3:26 | Las Vegas, Nevada, United States | Catchweight (157.5 lb) bout; Weaver missed weight. |
| Win | 15–4 | Kazula Vargas | DQ (illegal knee) | UFC Fight Night: Anderson vs. Błachowicz 2 | February 15, 2020 | 1 | 4:02 | Rio Rancho, New Mexico, United States | Return to Lightweight. |
| Win | 14–4 | Devin Smyth | Decision (unanimous) | Dana White's Contender Series 24 | August 13, 2019 | 3 | 5:00 | Las Vegas, Nevada, United States | |
| Win | 13–4 | James Freeman | DQ (corner interference) | Island Fights 52 | February 7, 2019 | 1 | 3:27 | Pensacola, Florida, United States | |
| Win | 12–4 | Tyler Hill | Submission (rear-naked choke) | Island Fights 51 | December 21, 2018 | 2 | 2:41 | Pensacola, Florida, United States | Return to Welterweight. |
| Win | 11–4 | Charles Bennett | Decision (split) | Island Fights 46 | February 8, 2018 | 3 | 5:00 | Pensacola, Florida, United States | |
| Win | 10–4 | Wesley Golden | Decision (split) | Island Fights 42 | October 14, 2017 | 3 | 5:00 | Pensacola, Florida, United States | |
| Win | 9–4 | Max Mustaki | Decision (Unanimous) | Island Fights 41 | July 22, 2017 | 3 | 5:00 | Pensacola, Florida, United States | |
| Win | 8–4 | Wanderley Camilo | Decision (Unanimous) | Island Fights 40 | April 14, 2017 | 3 | 5:00 | Pensacola, Florida, United States | |
| Loss | 7–4 | Martin Brown | TKO (punches) | Titan FC 41 | September 9, 2016 | 2 | 0:21 | Coral Gables, Florida, United States | Catchweight (160 lbs) bout. |
| Win | 7–3 | Rance Jones | Decision (Split) | Island Fights 37 | March 11, 2016 | 5 | 5:00 | Pensacola, Florida, United States | Welterweight bout; won the IF Welterweight Championship. |
| Win | 6–3 | Erimus Mills | Submission | Island Fights 34 | August 1, 2015 | 2 | 2:21 | Pensacola, Florida, United States | |
| Loss | 5–3 | Elvin Leon Brito | Decision (Unanimous) | Island Fights 33 | March 28, 2014 | 3 | 5:00 | Pensacola, Florida, United States | |
| Loss | 5–2 | Socrates Pierre | Submission (brabo choke) | Island Fights 31 | December 5, 2014 | 1 | 2:44 | Pensacola, Florida, United States | Return to Lightweight; for the vacant IF Lightweight Championship |
| Win | 5–1 | Raymond Camp | Decision (Unanimous) | Island Fights 30 | September 20, 2014 | 3 | 5:00 | Pensacola, Florida, United States | Welterweight debut. |
| Loss | 4–1 | Demarques Jackson | Decision (Unanimous) | Atlas Fights: Battle on Mobile Bay | April 12, 2014 | 3 | 5:00 | Mobile, Alabama, United States | |
| Win | 4–0 | Socrates Pierre | Submission | Island Fights 27 | February 8, 2014 | 2 | 4:56 | Pensacola, Florida, United States | Catchweight (160 lbs) bout. |
| Win | 3–0 | Daniel Watts | Decision (split) | AFC 1 | October 12, 2013 | 3 | 5:00 | Biloxi, Mississippi, United States | |
| Win | 2–0 | Craig McAlpine | TKO | Island Fights 24 | September 6, 2013 | 3 | 1:22 | Pensacola, Florida, United States | |
| Win | 1–0 | Ben Westmoreland | TKO (punches) | Atlas Fights 17 | August 17, 2013 | 1 | 2:04 | Biloxi, Mississippi, United States | |

== See also ==
- List of male mixed martial artists
