= Khama Worthy =

American mixed martial arts fighter

- Born: October 15, 1986 (age 40); Pittsburgh, Pennsylvania, United States
- Other names: The Deathstar
- Height: 5 ft 11 in (1.80 m)
- Weight: 154.5 lb (70 kg; 11 st 1 lb)
- Division: Lightweight; Featherweight
- Reach: 74 in (188 cm)
- Fighting out of: Pittsburgh, Pennsylvania
- Team: Pittsburgh Academy
- Rank: Purple belt in Brazilian Jiu-Jitsu
- Years active: 2012–2022

Mixed martial arts record
- Total: 32
- Wins: 20
- By knockout: 11
- By submission: 3
- By decision: 6
- Losses: 12
- By knockout: 10
- By submission: 1
- By decision: 1

Other information
- Mixed martial arts record from Sherdog

Khama Worthy (born October 15, 1986) is an American professional mixed martial artist who competes in the Lightweight division. A professional since 2012, he has fought in the Ultimate Fighting Championship (UFC), King of the Cage and CES MMA.

== Background ==
Born and raised in Pittsburgh, Pennsylvania, Worthy began training in MMA at the age of 20.

== Mixed martial arts career ==
=== Early career ===
Worthy competed as an amateur from 2009 until 2011, amassing a record of 8–2. Starting out his professional career in 2012, Worthy fought mostly for various organizations throughout the American Northeast. Amassing a record of 14–6 before entering the UFC, Worthy fought for the SOFC Featherweight championship against fellow UFC fighter, Billy Quarantillo, and won the 247 Fighting Championships Lightweight Title.

=== Ultimate Fighting Championship ===
Worthy made his UFC debut as a late replacement for Clay Collard against Devonte Smith on August 17, 2019, at UFC 241. He won the fight via technical knockout in round one. This win earned him the Performance of the Night award.

Worthy faced Luis Peña on June 27, 2020, at UFC on ESPN: Poirier vs. Hooker. He won the fight via a guillotine choke in round three.

A lightweight bout between Khama Worthy and Ottman Azaitar was previously scheduled to take place at UFC 249. However, the event was cancelled in early April due to the COVID-19 pandemic. The pairing was then rescheduled to UFC Fight Night: Overeem vs. Sakai. In turn, the pair was removed from that event due to undisclosed reasons and moved to UFC Fight Night: Waterson vs. Hill Worthy lost the fight via technical knockout in the first round.

Worthy faced Jamie Mullarkey on March 27, 2021, at UFC 260. He lost the fight via knockout in round one.

Worthy faced Jai Herbert on October 23, 2021, at UFC Fight Night 196. He lost the fight via technical knockout in round one.

On November 14, 2021, it was announced Worthy was released by UFC.

=== Post-UFC career ===
After being released from the UFC, Worthy made his return to 247 Fighting Championship against Jeremiah Scott at 247 FC: Brawl in the Burgh 10 on February 5, 2022. He won the bout via TKO in the first round.

Worthy faced Kaheem Murray on April 16, 2022, at 247 FC: Brawl in the Burgh 11. He won the bout via knockout in the first round.

After losing to Trevor Peek via first round knockout on August 13, 2022, at Aries Fight Series: AMPD, Worthy won a majority decision victory over Josh Rohler on October 22, 2022, at 247 FC: Brawl in the Burgh 14. He retired from MMA right after the bout.

Worthy had a boxing fight on March 7, 2023, against Jonathan Burrs and won via decision.

In early 2024, Worthy announced a return to the cage, again with 247 Fighting Championships. In his return bout on April 20, 2024, Worthy picked up a decision win over Jimmy Sandlin at Brawl in the Burgh 21.

Worthy faced Olivier Murad at 247 FC's Brawl in the Burgh 23 on September 21, 2024 and lost by unanimous decision.

== Personal life ==
Khama and his wife, Nicole, have a daughter, born 2017.

== Championships and accomplishments ==
=== Mixed martial arts ===
- 247 Fighting Championship
  - 247 Lightweight Champion
    - One successful title defense
- Ultimate Fighting Championship
  - Performance of the Night (One time) vs. Devonte Smith
  - UFC.com Awards
    - 2019: Upset of the Year vs. Devonte Smith

== Mixed martial arts record ==
Professional record breakdown
| 32 matches | 20 wins | 12 losses |
| By knockout | 11 | 10 |
| By submission | 3 | 1 |
| By decision | 6 | 1 |

| Res. | Record | Opponent | Method | Event | Date | Round | Time | Location | Notes |
|---|---|---|---|---|---|---|---|---|---|
| Loss | 20–12 | Jeremy Henry | TKO (punches) | 247 FC: Brawl in the Burgh 27 | March 15, 2025 | 1 | 3:04 | Murrysville, Pennsylvania, United States | |
| Loss | 20–11 | Olivier Murad | Decision (unanimous) | 247 FC: Brawl in the Burgh 23 | September 21, 2024 | 3 | 5:00 | Monroeville, Pennsylvania, United States | |
| Win | 20–10 | Jimmy Sandlin | Decision (unanimous) | 247 FC: Brawl in the Burgh 21 | April 20, 2024 | 3 | 5:00 | Washington, Pennsylvania, United States | |
| Win | 19–10 | Josh Rohler | Decision (majority) | 247 FC: Brawl in the Burgh 14 | October 22, 2022 | 3 | 5:00 | Washington, Pennsylvania, United States | |
| Loss | 18–10 | Trevor Peek | KO (punch) | Aries Fight Series: AMPD | August 13, 2022 | 1 | 4:44 | Nashville, Tennessee, United States | |
| Win | 18–9 | Kaheem Murray | KO (punch) | 247 FC: Brawl in the Burgh 11 | April 16, 2022 | 1 | 1:52 | Monroeville, Pennsylvania, United States | |
| Win | 17–9 | Jeremiah Scott | TKO (strikes) | 247 FC: Brawl in the Burgh 10 | February 5, 2022 | 1 | 2:21 | Monroeville, Pennsylvania, United States | |
| Loss | 16–9 | Jai Herbert | TKO (punches) | UFC Fight Night: Costa vs. Vettori | October 23, 2021 | 1 | 2:47 | Las Vegas, Nevada, United States | |
| Loss | 16–8 | Jamie Mullarkey | KO (punches) | UFC 260 | March 27, 2021 | 1 | 0:46 | Las Vegas, Nevada, United States | |
| Loss | 16–7 | Ottman Azaitar | TKO (punches) | UFC Fight Night: Waterson vs. Hill | September 12, 2020 | 1 | 1:33 | Las Vegas, Nevada, United States | |
| Win | 16–6 | Luis Peña | Submission (guillotine choke) | UFC on ESPN: Poirier vs. Hooker | June 27, 2020 | 3 | 2:53 | Las Vegas, Nevada, United States | |
| Win | 15–6 | Devonte Smith | TKO (punches) | UFC 241 | August 17, 2019 | 1 | 4:15 | Anaheim, California, United States | Performance of the Night. |
| Win | 14–6 | Adam Ward | KO (punches) | 247 FC: Brawl In The Burgh | July 27, 2019 | 3 | 0:13 | Canonsburg, Pennsylvania, United States | Won the 247 Lightweight Championship. |
| Win | 13–6 | Joey Munoz | Decision (unanimous) | 247 FC: Steeltown Throwdown | April 6, 2019 | 3 | 5:00 | Canonsburg, Pennsylvania, United States | |
| Win | 12–6 | Tim Cho | Submission (rear-naked choke) | Pinnacle FC 18 | December 22, 2018 | 2 | 0:18 | Pittsburgh, Pennsylvania, United States | |
| Win | 11–6 | Brady Hovermale | TKO (punches) | Made Men Promotions: Rivers Rumble MMA | July 14, 2018 | 3 | 4:34 | Pittsburgh, Pennsylvania, United States | |
| Win | 10–6 | Michael Roberts | Decision (unanimous) | Pinnacle FC 16 | March 24, 2018 | 3 | 5:00 | Canonsburg, Pennsylvania, United States | Return to Lightweight. |
| Loss | 9–6 | Kyle Nelson | KO (punch) | BTC 1 | May 27, 2017 | 1 | 1:03 | Toronto, Ontario, Canada | |
| Loss | 9–5 | Anthony Retic | KO (punches) | KOTC: Destructive Intent | July 23, 2016 | 1 | 1:06 | Washington, Pennsylvania, United States | |
| Win | 9–4 | Adrian Vilaca | Submission (rear-naked choke) | GOTC MMA 21 | June 4, 2016 | 2 | 4:48 | Pittsburgh, Pennsylvania, United States | |
| Win | 8–4 | Antonio Castillo Jr. | TKO (punches) | Pinnacle FC: Pittsburgh Challenge Series 12 | November 25, 2015 | 3 | 0:14 | Cheswick, Pennsylvania, United States | |
| Loss | 7–4 | Matt Bessette | KO (punch) | CES MMA 29 | June 12, 2015 | 2 | 2:42 | Lincoln, Rhode Island, United States | |
| Loss | 7–3 | Billy Quarantillo | TKO | SOFC: Strike Off 4 | February 28, 2015 | 2 | 0:10 | Annandale, Virginia, United States | For the vacant SOFC Featherweight Championship. |
| Win | 7–2 | Matt DiMarcantonio | TKO (punches) | Pinnacle FC: Pittsburgh Challenge Series 9 | November 26, 2014 | 1 | 4:49 | Canonsburg, Pennsylvania, United States | |
| Win | 6–2 | Anthony Morgan | TKO (punches) | Pinnacle FC: Pittsburgh Challenge Series 7 | May 24, 2014 | 2 | 4:52 | Pittsburgh, Pennsylvania, United States | |
| Win | 5–2 | Jacob Butler | KO (punch) | Pinnacle FC: Pittsburgh Challenge Series 6 | March 29, 2014 | 1 | 0:26 | Pittsburgh, Pennsylvania, United States | |
| Win | 4–2 | Reggie Merriweather | Decision (unanimous) | Pinnacle FC: Pittsburgh Challenge Series 5 | November 27, 2013 | 3 | 5:00 | Canonsburg, Pennsylvania, United States | |
| Win | 3–2 | Francis Healy | TKO (punches) | Pinnacle FC: Pittsburgh Challenge Series 3 | June 29, 2013 | 2 | 0:57 | Canonsburg, Pennsylvania, United States | Featherweight debut. |
| Win | 2–2 | Jason Willett | Decision (unanimous) | Pinnacle FC: Pittsburgh Challenge Series 2 | April 20, 2013 | 3 | 5:00 | Canonsburg, Pennsylvania, United States | |
| Loss | 1–2 | Paul Felder | TKO (punches) | Pinnacle FC: Pittsburgh Challenge Series 1 | December 29, 2012 | 1 | 1:10 | Canonsburg, Pennsylvania, United States | |
| Win | 1–1 | Victer Crenshaw | TKO (Doctor Stoppage) | NAAFS: Caged Fury 18 | August 25, 2012 | 3 | 3:46 | Charleston, West Virginia, United States | |
| Loss | 0–1 | George Comer | Submission (rear-naked choke) | NAAFS: Fight Night in the Flats 8 | June 2, 2012 | 2 | 3:58 | Cleveland, Ohio, United States | |

== Karate Combat record ==
Professional record breakdown
| 1 match | 0 wins | 1 loss |
| By decision | 0 | 1 |

| Res. | Record | Opponent | Method | Event | Date | Round | Time | Location | Notes |
|---|---|---|---|---|---|---|---|---|---|
| Loss | 0-1 | Rafael Alves | Decision (Unanimous) | Karate Combat 51 | December 19, 2024 | 3 | 3:00 | Miami, United States | |

== See also ==
- List of male mixed martial artists
