= UFC Fight Night: Volkov vs. Aspinall =

Mixed martial arts event in 2022

- The poster for UFC Fight Night: Volkov vs. Aspinall
- Promotion: Ultimate Fighting Championship
- Date: March 19, 2022
- Venue: The O_{2} Arena
- City: London, England
- Attendance: 17,081
- Total gate: $4,500,000

Event chronology
UFC Fight Night: Santos vs. Ankalaev	UFC Fight Night: Volkov vs. Aspinall	UFC on ESPN: Blaydes vs. Daukaus

UFC Fight Night: Volkov vs. Aspinall (also known as UFC Fight Night 204 and UFC on ESPN+ 62) was a mixed martial arts event produced by the Ultimate Fighting Championship that took place on March 19, 2022, at The O_{2} Arena in London, England.

== Background ==
The event was the first in London since UFC Fight Night: Till vs. Masvidal in March 2019. The UFC was expected to return to the city in March 2020 at UFC Fight Night: Woodley vs. Edwards and in September 2021 at UFC Fight Night: Brunson vs. Till, but the first event was cancelled due to the COVID-19 pandemic, and the latter was relocated to Las Vegas.

A heavyweight bout between former Bellator Heavyweight World Champion Alexander Volkov and Tom Aspinall headlined the event. Aspinall was originally expected to face Shamil Abdurakhimov, but after he was pulled in favor of the main event spot, Abdurakhimov was rescheduled against Sergei Pavlovich instead.

A bantamweight bout between Jack Shore and Umar Nurmagomedov was scheduled for the event. However, Nurmagomedov was removed from the bout due to undisclosed reasons and replaced by Timur Valiev.

A flyweight bout between Jake Hadley and Francisco Figueiredo was scheduled for the event. However, Figueiredo withdrew from the event due to undisclosed reasons and was replaced by Allan Nascimento. Hadley eventually had to pull out due to injury and the bout was scrapped. They were later rescheduled to meet at UFC Fight Night 209.

A lightweight bout between Jai Herbert and Mike Davis was scheduled for the event. However, Davis withdrew from the bout for personal reasons and was replaced by Ilia Topuria.

Cláudio Silva was expected to face Gunnar Nelson in a welterweight bout. However, Silva pulled out in early March due to a knee injury. He was replaced by Takashi Sato.

A bantamweight bout between Liudvik Sholinian and Nathaniel Wood was scheduled for this event. However, due to the Russian invasion of Ukraine, Sholinian was unable to leave Ukraine or train properly, so he was replaced by Vince Morales. In turn, just days before the event, Morales withdrew due to illness. The pairing will be rescheduled for a future event.

== Results ==
Main card (ESPN+)
Weight class				Method	Round	Time	Notes
Heavyweight	Tom Aspinall	def.	Alexander Volkov	Submission (straight armbar)	1	3:45
Featherweight	Arnold Allen	def.	Dan Hooker	TKO (punches and elbows)	1	2:33
Lightweight	Paddy Pimblett	def.	Kazula Vargas	Submission (rear-naked choke)	1	3:50
Welterweight	Gunnar Nelson	def.	Takashi Sato	Decision (unanimous) (30–26, 30–26, 30–26)	3	5:00
Women's Flyweight	Molly McCann	def.	Luana Carolina	KO (spinning back elbow)	3	1:52
Lightweight	Ilia Topuria	def.	Jai Herbert	KO (punches)	2	1:07
Preliminary card (ESPN+)
Featherweight	Makwan Amirkhani	def.	Mike Grundy	Technical Submission (anaconda choke)	1	0:57
Heavyweight	Sergei Pavlovich	def.	Shamil Abdurakhimov	TKO (punches)	1	4:03
Light Heavyweight	Paul Craig	def.	Nikita Krylov	Submission (triangle choke)	1	3:57
Bantamweight	Jack Shore	def.	Timur Valiev	Decision (unanimous) (29–28, 29-28, 29–27)	3	5:00
Women's Strawweight	Elise Reed	def.	Cory McKenna	Decision (split) (27–30, 29–28, 29–28)	3	5:00
Flyweight	Muhammad Mokaev	def.	Cody Durden	Submission (guillotine choke)	1	0:58

== Bonus awards ==
The following fighters received $50,000. While the UFC usually gives out four bonus awards for each event, a record of nine post-fight bonuses were given out to each fighter who secured a finish.

- Fight of the Night: No bonus awarded.
- Performance of the Night: Tom Aspinall, Arnold Allen, Paddy Pimblett, Molly McCann, Ilia Topuria, Makwan Amirkhani, Sergei Pavlovich, Paul Craig, and Muhammad Mokaev

== Aftermath ==
The event was widely regarded by the MMA media as the best event of 2022.

== See also ==
- List of UFC events
- List of current UFC fighters
- 2022 in UFC
