= Ariane Lipski da Silva =

Brazilian mixed martial artist (born 1994)

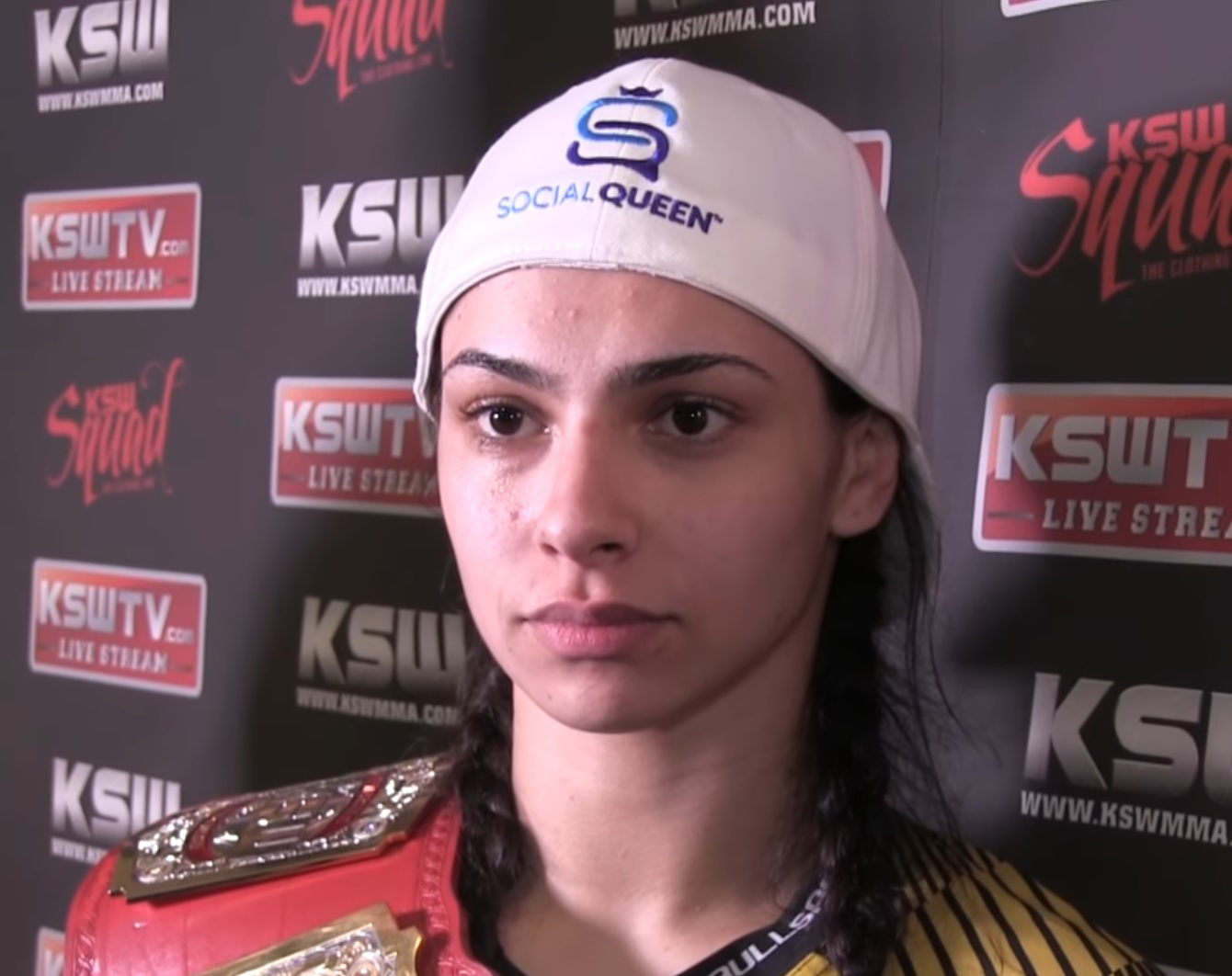
- Born: Ariane Lipski; 26 January 1994 (age 32); Curitiba, Parana, Brazil
- Other names: The Queen of Violence
- Height: 5 ft 6 in (1.68 m)
- Weight: 125 lb (57 kg; 8 st 13 lb)
- Division: Flyweight
- Reach: 67 in (170 cm)
- Style: Muay Thai
- Fighting out of: Coconut Creek, Florida, U.S.
- Team: Rasthai; American Top Team; Lioness Studio
- Teacher: Renato Rasta
- Rank: Black belt in Muay Thai; Purple belt in Brazilian Jiu-Jitsu under Leticia Lalli and Sebastian Lalli
- Years active: 2013–2026

Mixed martial arts record
- Total: 30
- Wins: 18
- By knockout: 6
- By submission: 4
- By decision: 8
- Losses: 12
- By knockout: 4
- By submission: 2
- By decision: 6

Other information
- Mixed martial arts record from Sherdog

Ariane Lipski da Silva (born 26 January 1994) is a Brazilian former mixed martial artist who competed in the women's Flyweight division. She has fought in the Ultimate Fighting Championship (UFC), Professional Fighters League (PFL) and Konfrontacja Sztuk Walki, where she is a former KSW Women's Flyweight Champion.

== Background ==
Lipski da Silva was born in Curitiba, Brazil, with Polish heritage. Her grandfather migrated to Brazil before the Second World War for security reasons. Lipski started training Muay Thai at a young age and became the Brazilian Muay Thai champion prior to her transition to MMA.

== Mixed martial arts career ==
=== Early career ===
Lipski da Silva fought most of her early MMA career primarily in Brazil and Poland, notably under the Konfrontacja Sztuk Walki promotion. After winning her debut in KSW, she faced Sheila Gaff at KSW 36, where she won via knockout in the first round. She then faced Diana Belbiţă for the KSW Women's Flyweight Championship at KSW 39: Colosseum, winning the bout via armbar at the end of the first round. She defended the title against Mariana Morais on 22 October 2017, at KSW 40. She won via rear-naked choke less than a minute into the first round. In her last performance for KSW, Lipski faced Silvana Gómez Juárez on 3 March 2018, at KSW 42. She won the bout and defended the title via unanimous decision.

She was later signed by the UFC.

=== Ultimate Fighting Championship ===
Lipski da Silva was scheduled to make her UFC debut against Maryna Moroz, replacing injured Veronica Macedo, on 17 November 2018, at UFC Fight Night 140. In turn, Moroz pulled out due to injury on 30 October and as a result the bout was cancelled.

Her UFC debut came two months later on 19 January 2019, against Joanne Calderwood at UFC Fight Night: Cejudo vs. Dillashaw. She lost the fight by unanimous decision.

Her second fight came on 22 June 2019 against Molly McCann at UFC Fight Night: Moicano vs. Korean Zombie. She lost the fight via unanimous decision.

On 1 August 2019, it was announced that Lipski da Silva would fight Priscila Cachoeira at UFC on ESPN+ 22. However, due to Cachoeira tested positive for a diuretic she was forced to pull out from the event. Thus her bout with Lipski was cancelled in the event and Lipski was then scheduled to fight at UFC Fight Night: Ortega vs. Korean Zombie against Veronica Macedo on 21 December 2019, but then moved to UFC Fight Night: Błachowicz vs. Jacaré on 16 November 2019. In turn, Macedo was not cleared to fight by CABMMA due to severe headaches one day before the event and she was replaced by newcomer Isabella de Padua. At the weigh-ins, de Padua weighed in at 130.5 pounds, 4.5 pounds over the flyweight non-title fight limit of 126. The bout proceeded at a catchweight. As a result of missing weight, de Padue was fined 30% of her purse, which went to her opponent Lipski. She won the fight via unanimous decision.

As the first of her new, four-fight contract Lipski da Silva was scheduled to face Luana Carolina on 16 May 2020, at UFC Fight Night 175. However, on 9 April, Dana White, the president of the UFC, announced that this event was postponed to 13 June 2020. Instead the pair eventually fought on 19 July 2020, at UFC Fight Night 172. Lipski won the fight by kneebar submission in the first round. This win earned her a Performance of the Night award.

Lipski da Silva faced Antonina Shevchenko on 21 November 2020, at UFC 255. She lost the fight via technical knockout. Lipski confirmed she had suffered a facial fracture in the loss to Shevchenko a day later.

Lipski da Silva faced Montana De La Rosa on 5 June 2021, at UFC Fight Night: Rozenstruik vs. Sakai. She lost via TKO in the second round.

As the first fight of her new contract, Lipski da Silva was scheduled to face Mandy Böhm, replacing Taila Santos, on 4 September 2021, at UFC Fight Night 191. However, the bout was removed from the card during the week leading up to that event as Böhm was sidelined due to illness and the bout was rescheduled to UFC Fight Night 192 on 18 September 2021. Lipski won the fight via unanimous decision after knocking Böhm down twice during the bout.

Lipski da Silva was scheduled to face JJ Aldrich on 12 March 2022, at UFC Fight Night 203. However, Lipski was removed from her match for undisclosed reasons, and she was replaced by Gillian Robertson.

Lipski da Silva was scheduled to face Priscila Cachoeira on 6 August 2022, at UFC on ESPN 40. At the weigh-ins, Lipski weighed in at 128.5 pounds, two and a half pounds over the flyweight non-title fight limit. The bout is expected to proceed at catchweight with Lipski fined 20% of her purse, which will go to Cachoeira, but they were rescheduled to UFC on ESPN 41 in a bantamweight bout after Lipski was not medically cleared. Lipski lost the fight via technical knockout.

Lipski da Silva faced JJ Aldrich on 11 March 2023, at UFC Fight Night 221. She won the fight via unanimous decision.

Lipski da Silva faced Melissa Gatto on 1 July 2023, at UFC on ESPN 48. She won the fight via split decision.

Lipski da Silva faced Casey O'Neill on 16 December 2023, at UFC 296. She won the fight via an armbar submission in the second round. This fight earned her the Performance of the Night award.

Lipski da Silva faced Karine Silva on 27 April 2024 at UFC on ESPN 55. She lost the fight by unanimous decision.

Lipski da Silva faced Jasmine Jasudavicius on 2 November 2024 at UFC Fight Night 246. She lost the fight via a brabo choke submission in the third round.

Lipski da Silva faced Wang Cong on 7 June 2025 at UFC 316. At the weigh-ins, da Silva weighed in at 132 pounds, six pounds over the flyweight non-title fight limit. As a result, the bout proceeded at catchweight and she was fined 25 percent of her purse which went to Wang. da Silva lost the fight by unanimous decision.

On 11 June 2025, it was reported that Lipski da Silva was released by the UFC.

=== Professional Fighters League ===
On September 29, 2025, it was announced that she had signed a contract with the PFL.

In her PFL debut, Lipski da Silva faced Sumiko Inaba on March 28, 2026, at PFL Pittsburgh. She won the fight via unanimous decision.

Lipski da Silva faced Jena Bishop on June 27, 2026, at PFL San Diego. She lost the fight via an armbar in round one.

Following her loss, Lipski da Silva announced her retirement from mixed martial arts.

== Championships and accomplishments ==
=== Mixed martial arts ===
- Ultimate Fighting Championship
  - Performance of the Night (Two times) vs. Luana Carolina and Casey O'Neill
  - Tied (Natália Silva, Ariane da Silva, Alexa Grasso & Carli Judice) for most knockdowns in UFC Women's Flyweight division history (3)
  - Tied (Gillian Robertson) for fifth most bouts in UFC Women's Flyweight division history (13)
  - UFC Honors Awards
    - 2020: Fan's Choice Submission of the Year Nominee vs. Luana Carolina
  - UFC.com Awards
    - 2020: Submission of the Year vs. Luana Carolina
    - 2023: Ranked #7 Upset of the Year & Ranked #5 Submission of the Year vs. Casey O'Neill
- Konfrontacja Sztuk Walki
  - KSW Women's Flyweight Championship (one time; former)
    - Two successful title defenses vs. Mariana Morais and Silvana Gómez Juárez.
- LowKick MMA
  - 2020 Submission of the Year vs. Luana Carolina at UFC Fight Night: Figueiredo vs. Benavidez 2
- MMA Junkie
  - 2020 July Submission of the Month vs. Luana Carolina

== Mixed martial arts record ==
Professional record breakdown
| 30 matches | 18 wins | 12 losses |
| By knockout | 6 | 4 |
| By submission | 4 | 2 |
| By decision | 8 | 6 |

| Res. | Record | Opponent | Method | Event | Date | Round | Time | Location | Notes |
|---|---|---|---|---|---|---|---|---|---|
| Loss | 18–12 | Jena Bishop | Submission (armbar) | PFL San Diego: McKee vs. Isbulaev | 27 June 2026 | 1 | 4:08 | San Diego, California, United States | |
| Win | 18–11 | Sumiko Inaba | Decision (unanimous) | PFL Pittsburgh: Eblen vs. Battle | 28 March 2026 | 3 | 5:00 | Moon Township, Pennsylvania, United States | |
| Loss | 17–11 | Wang Cong | Decision (unanimous) | UFC 316 | 7 June 2025 | 3 | 5:00 | Newark, New Jersey, United States | Catchweight (132 lb) bout; da Silva missed weight. |
| Loss | 17–10 | Jasmine Jasudavicius | Submission (brabo choke) | UFC Fight Night: Moreno vs. Albazi | 2 November 2024 | 3 | 2:28 | Edmonton, Alberta, Canada | |
| Loss | 17–9 | Karine Silva | Decision (unanimous) | UFC on ESPN: Nicolau vs. Perez | 27 April 2024 | 3 | 5:00 | Las Vegas, Nevada, United States | |
| Win | 17–8 | Casey O'Neill | Submission (armbar) | UFC 296 | 16 December 2023 | 2 | 1:18 | Las Vegas, Nevada, United States | Performance of the Night. |
| Win | 16–8 | Melissa Gatto | Decision (split) | UFC on ESPN: Strickland vs. Magomedov | 1 July 2023 | 3 | 5:00 | Las Vegas, Nevada, United States | |
| Win | 15–8 | JJ Aldrich | Decision (unanimous) | UFC Fight Night: Yan vs. Dvalishvili | 11 March 2023 | 3 | 5:00 | Las Vegas, Nevada, United States | Return to Flyweight. |
| Loss | 14–8 | Priscila Cachoeira | TKO (punches) | UFC on ESPN: Vera vs. Cruz | 13 August 2022 | 1 | 1:05 | San Diego, California, United States | Bantamweight debut. |
| Win | 14–7 | Mandy Böhm | Decision (unanimous) | UFC Fight Night: Smith vs. Spann | 18 September 2021 | 3 | 5:00 | Las Vegas, Nevada, United States | |
| Loss | 13–7 | Montana De La Rosa | TKO (punches) | UFC Fight Night: Rozenstruik vs. Sakai | 5 June 2021 | 2 | 4:27 | Las Vegas, Nevada, United States | |
| Loss | 13–6 | Antonina Shevchenko | TKO (punches) | UFC 255 | 21 November 2020 | 2 | 4:33 | Las Vegas, Nevada, United States | |
| Win | 13–5 | Luana Carolina | Submission (kneebar) | UFC Fight Night: Figueiredo vs. Benavidez 2 | 19 July 2020 | 1 | 1:28 | Abu Dhabi, United Arab Emirates | Performance of the Night. Submission of the Year. |
| Win | 12–5 | Isabela de Pádua | Decision (unanimous) | UFC Fight Night: Błachowicz vs. Jacaré | 16 November 2019 | 3 | 5:00 | São Paulo, Brazil | Catchweight (130.5 lb) bout; de Pádua missed weight. de Pádua was deducted one point in round 2 due to an illegal upkick. |
| Loss | 11–5 | Molly McCann | Decision (unanimous) | UFC Fight Night: Moicano vs. The Korean Zombie | 22 June 2019 | 3 | 5:00 | Greenville, South Carolina, United States | |
| Loss | 11–4 | Joanne Calderwood | Decision (unanimous) | UFC Fight Night: Cejudo vs. Dillashaw | 19 January 2019 | 3 | 5:00 | Brooklyn, New York, United States | |
| Win | 11–3 | Silvana Gómez Juárez | Decision (unanimous) | KSW 42 | 3 March 2018 | 5 | 5:00 | Łódź, Poland | Defended the KSW Women's Flyweight Championship. |
| Win | 10–3 | Mariana Morais | Submission (rear-naked choke) | KSW 40 | 22 October 2017 | 1 | 0:58 | Dublin, Ireland | Defended the KSW Women's Flyweight Championship. Submission of the Night. |
| Win | 9–3 | Diana Belbiţă | Submission (armbar) | KSW 39 | 27 May 2017 | 1 | 4:52 | Warsaw, Poland | Won the inaugural KSW Women's Flyweight Championship. |
| Win | 8–3 | Sheila Gaff | KO (punches) | KSW 36 | 1 October 2016 | 1 | 2:09 | Zielona Góra, Poland | Fight of the Night. |
| Win | 7–3 | Juliana Werner | KO (punch) | Imortal FC 4 | 21 May 2016 | 2 | 4:26 | São José da Tapera, Brazil | |
| Win | 6–3 | Katarzyna Lubońska | TKO (punch and body Kick) | KSW 33 | 28 November 2015 | 2 | 3:25 | Kraków, Poland | |
| Win | 5–3 | Paula Vieira da Silva | TKO (punches) | Striker's House Cup 55 | 17 October 2015 | 1 | 1:04 | Curitiba, Brazil | |
| Win | 4–3 | Marta Souza | Decision (unanimous) | Striker's House Cup 52 | 15 August 2015 | 3 | 5:00 | Curitiba, Brazil | |
| Win | 3–3 | Geisyele Nascimento | TKO (punches) | Striker's House Cup 50 | 5 June 2015 | 1 | 0:35 | Curitiba, Brazil | |
| Loss | 2–3 | Isabelly Varela | Decision (split) | Curitiba Top Fight 9 | 3 March 2015 | 3 | 5:00 | Curitiba, Brazil | |
| Loss | 2–2 | Daiane Firmino | TKO (punches) | MMA Super Heroes 7 | 15 November 2014 | 1 | 2:28 | São José da Tapera, Brazil | Return to Flyweight. |
| Win | 2–1 | Jaquelline Santana | TKO (punches) | Gladiator Combat Fight 7 | 6 September 2014 | 1 | 0:20 | Curitiba, Brazil | Strawweight debut. |
| Loss | 1–1 | Gisele Moreira | Decision (unanimous) | Nitrix Champion Fight 21 | 1 June 2014 | 1 | 0:20 | São José da Tapera, Brazil | |
| Win | 1–0 | Daiana Torquato | Decision (unanimous) | Nitrix Champion Fight 17 | 3 March 2013 | 3 | 5:00 | Balneário Camboriú, Brazil | Flyweight debut. |

== See also ==
- List of female mixed martial artists
