= Paddy Pimblett =

English mixed martial artist (born 1995)

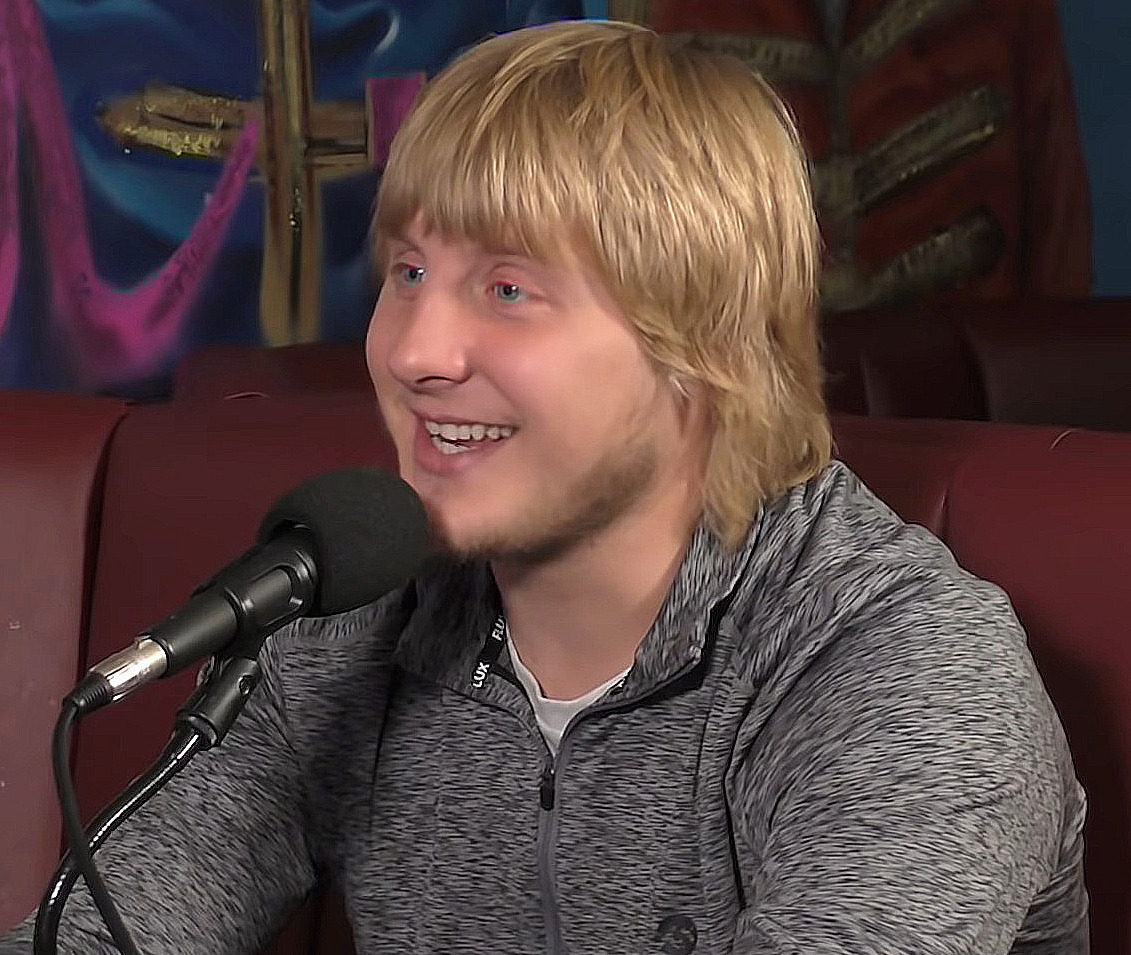
- Pimblett in 2021
- Born: Patrick Mark Pimblett; 3 January 1995 (age 31); Liverpool, Merseyside, England
- Nickname: The Baddy
- Height: 5 ft 10 in (178 cm)
- Weight: 155 lb (70 kg; 11 st 1 lb)
- Division: Bantamweight (2012–2013); Featherweight (2014–2017); Lightweight (2018–present)
- Reach: 73 in (185 cm)
- Fighting out of: Liverpool, England
- Team: Next Generation MMA Liverpool
- Rank: 2nd degree black belt in Brazilian jiu-jitsu under Paul Rimmer
- Years active: 2012–present

Mixed martial arts record
- Total: 28
- Wins: 24
- By knockout: 7
- By submission: 11
- By decision: 6
- Losses: 4
- By submission: 1
- By decision: 3

Other information
- Spouse: Laura Gregory (m. 2023)
- Mixed martial arts record from Sherdog

YouTube information
- Channel: Paddy The Baddy
- Subscribers: 1.31 million
- Views: 199.2 million
- Last updated: 6 June 2026

Patrick Mark Pimblett (born 3 January 1995) is an Engish professional mixed martial artist. A professional since 2012, Pimblett is a former Cage Warriors Featherweight Champion. He currently competes in the Lightweight division of the Ultimate Fighting Championship (UFC). As of 11 July 2026, he is #5 in the Meta UFC lightweight rankings.

== Early life ==
Paddy Pimblett was born on 3 January 1995 and grew up in Huyton, Merseyside. He attended St Margaret Mary's Primary school and Cardinal Heenan Catholic High School. Influenced by the fight between Rich Franklin and Vitor Belfort at UFC 103, he started training in mixed martial arts at the age of 15, joining Next Generation MMA and deciding he would compete in the sport for a living shortly afterwards.

== Mixed martial arts career ==
=== Early career ===
Pimblett made his debut in 2012, aged 17, racking up a 3–0 record before signing with Cage Warriors a year later. In 2016, he claimed the Cage Warriors featherweight championship, beating Johnny Frachey at the Echo Arena in Liverpool, and defended it once against Julian Erosa, winning a highly controversial unanimous decision. In April 2017, Pimblett lost it against Nad Narimani and moved up to lightweight. After a win, he challenged for the Cage Warriors lightweight championship, losing by unanimous decision to Søren Bak. After two more wins in the organisation, Pimblett signed a contract with the Ultimate Fighting Championship. Pimblett had previously declined two UFC deals, getting better financial offers from Cage Warriors.

=== Ultimate Fighting Championship ===
Pimblett made his promotional debut against Luigi Vendramini on 4 September 2021, at UFC Fight Night 191. Pimblett won the bout via knockout in the first round. This fight earned him a Performance of the night bonus. In October 2021, Pimblett signed an endorsement deal with Barstool Sports worth over $1,000,000.

Pimblett faced Rodrigo Vargas on 19 March 2022 at UFC Fight Night 204. He won the fight via submission in round one. With this win, he received his second consecutive Performance of the Night award. Paddy would later reveal he made $12,000 to show and $12,000 to win.

Pimblett next faced Jordan Leavitt on 23 July 2022 at UFC Fight Night 208. He won the fight via rear-naked choke submission in the second round. This win earned him the Performance of the Night award.

Pimblett faced Jared Gordon on 10 December 2022 at UFC 282. He won the bout via unanimous decision. The decision was met with controversy, as many media outlets, fighters, and fans expressed their belief that Gordon had won the fight. 23 out of 24 media sources scored the fight in favour of Gordon.

Pimblett faced Tony Ferguson on 16 December 2023 at UFC 296. He won the fight via unanimous decision.

Pimblett faced King Green on 27 July 2024 at UFC 304. He won the fight by a triangle-choke submission in the first round. This fight earned him a $200,000 Performance of the Night award.

Pimblett faced former three-time Bellator Lightweight World Champion (also former UFC Lightweight Championship challenger) Michael Chandler in the five-round co-main event on 12 April 2025 at UFC 314. He won the fight by technical knockout in the third round. This fight earned him another Performance of the Night award.

Pimblett competed for the Interim UFC Lightweight Championship against former interim champion Justin Gaethje on 24 January 2026 at UFC 324. He lost the fight by unanimous decision. This fight earned him a $100,000 Fight of the Night award.

Pimblett faced Benoît Saint Denis on 11 July 2026, in the co-main event of UFC 329. He won the fight by technical submission via a Peruvian necktie in the first round. This fight earned him a $100,000 Performance of the Night award.

== Personal life ==
Pimblett married his longtime girlfriend Laura Gregory on 28 May 2023 at Peckforton Castle in Cheshire. In November of the same year, the couple announced they were expecting twin daughters.

Pimblett is a close friend of fellow mixed martial artist Molly McCann. Pimblett has a YouTube channel.

Pimblett describes himself as a socialist and an opponent of the Conservative Party. He supports the Liverpool-wide boycott of The Sun newspaper. He criticised Keir Starmer's government, expressing his wish that Jeremy Corbyn was still the leader of Labour.

Pimblett is a supporter of Liverpool Football Club and has expressed a desire to fight at the team's home stadium of Anfield.

Pimblett has said that his trademark floppy hair and lack of tattoos allows children to identify with him in a way that would not be possible for them to do if he was "a big hard fella with lots of tattoos". He later switched to a braided hairstyle before his fight with Tony Ferguson in December 2023, which he has used since. Pimblett made the change because he believed his long hair made it appear as if he was taking damage when he was not, which influenced the perception of the judges.

In October 2021, Pimblett signed a seven-figure sponsorship deal with Barstool Sports. In December 2022, he launched The Baddy Foundation, a charity with the goals of improving men's mental health and helping children who face food insecurity. In that same month, he endorsed the hydration drink "Body Fuel".

== Championships and accomplishments ==
- Ultimate Fighting Championship
  - Fight of the Night (One time) vs. Justin Gaethje
  - Performance of the Night (Six times) vs. Luigi Vendramini, Rodrigo Vargas, Jordan Leavitt, King Green, Michael Chandler and Benoît Saint Denis
  - Second fastest D'Arche choke submission victory in UFC history (0:52) (vs. Benoît Saint Denis)
  - UFC Honors Awards
    - 2021: Fan's Choice Debut of the Year Nominee vs. Luigi Vendramini
    - 2024: Fan's Choice Submission of the Year Nominee vs. King Green
  - UFC.com Awards
    - 2021: Ranked #9 Newcomer of the Year
    - 2024: Ranked #2 Submission of the Year vs. King Green
- Cage Warriors Fighting Championship
  - CWFC Featherweight Championship (One time)
    - One successful title defence
- Full Contact Contender
  - FCC Featherweight Championship (One time)
    - One successful title defence
- World MMA Awards
  - 2022 Breakthrough Fighter of the Year
  - 1 July 2024 – 31 December 2025 International Fighter of the Year
- Combat Press
  - 2022 Breakout Fighter of the Year
- MMA Mania
  - 2024 #3 Ranked Submission of the Year vs. King Green at UFC 304
- Bloody Elbow
  - 2018 Submission of the Year vs. Alexis Savvidis at Cage Warriors 90
- MMA Junkie
  - 2026 January Fight of the Month vs. Justin Gaethje

== Mixed martial arts record ==
Professional record breakdown
28 matches	24 wins	4 losses
By knockout	7	0
By submission	11	1
By decision	6	3

Res.	Record	Opponent	Method	Event	Date	Round	Time	Location	Notes
Win	24–4	Benoît Saint Denis	Technical Submission (Peruvian necktie)	UFC 329	11 July 2026	1	0:52	Las Vegas, Nevada, United States	Performance of the Night.
Loss	23–4	Justin Gaethje	Decision (unanimous)	UFC 324	24 January 2026	5	5:00	Las Vegas, Nevada, United States	For the interim UFC Lightweight Championship. Fight of the Night.
Win	23–3	Michael Chandler	TKO (elbows and punches)	UFC 314	12 April 2025	3	3:07	Miami, Florida, United States	Performance of the Night.
Win	22–3	King Green	Technical Submission (triangle choke)	UFC 304	27 July 2024	1	3:22	Manchester, England	Performance of the Night.
Win	21–3	Tony Ferguson	Decision (unanimous)	UFC 296	16 December 2023	3	5:00	Las Vegas, Nevada, United States	
Win	20–3	Jared Gordon	Decision (unanimous)	UFC 282	10 December 2022	3	5:00	Las Vegas, Nevada, United States	
Win	19–3	Jordan Leavitt	Submission (rear-naked choke)	UFC Fight Night: Blaydes vs. Aspinall	23 July 2022	2	2:46	London, England	Performance of the Night.
Win	18–3	Rodrigo Vargas	Submission (rear-naked choke)	UFC Fight Night: Volkov vs. Aspinall	19 March 2022	1	3:50	London, England	Performance of the Night.
Win	17–3	Luigi Vendramini	KO (punches)	UFC Fight Night: Brunson vs. Till	4 September 2021	1	4:25	Las Vegas, Nevada, United States	Performance of the Night.
Win	16–3	Davide Martinez	Submission (rear-naked choke)	Cage Warriors 122	20 March 2021	1	1:37	London, England	
Win	15–3	Decky Dalton	TKO (punches)	Cage Warriors 113	20 March 2020	1	2:51	Manchester, England	
Loss	14–3	Søren Bak	Decision (unanimous)	Cage Warriors 96	1 September 2018	5	5:00	Liverpool, England	For the vacant Cage Warriors Lightweight Championship.
Win	14–2	Alexis Savvidis	Submission (flying triangle choke)	Cage Warriors 90	24 February 2018	2	0:53	Liverpool, England	Lightweight debut.
Loss	13–2	Nad Narimani	Decision (unanimous)	Cage Warriors 82	1 April 2017	5	5:00	Liverpool, England	Lost the Cage Warriors Featherweight Championship.
Win	13–1	Julian Erosa	Decision (unanimous)	Cage Warriors: Unplugged 1	12 November 2016	5	5:00	London, England	Defended the Cage Warriors Featherweight Championship.
Win	12–1	Johnny Frachey	TKO (punches)	Cage Warriors 78	10 September 2016	1	1:35	Liverpool, England	Won the vacant Cage Warriors Featherweight Championship.
Win	11–1	Teddy Violet	Submission (rear-naked choke)	Cage Warriors 77	8 July 2016	2	2:28	London, England	Catchweight (152 lb) bout.
Win	10–1	Ashleigh Grimshaw	Decision (unanimous)	Cage Warriors 75	15 April 2016	3	5:00	London, England	
Win	9–1	Miguel Haro	Submission (rear-naked choke)	Full Contact Contender 13	20 June 2015	1	4:46	Manchester, England	Defended the FCC Featherweight Championship.
Win	8–1	Kevin Petshi	Submission (rear-naked choke)	Full Contact Contender 12	28 March 2015	2	1:56	Manchester, England	Won the vacant FCC Featherweight Championship.
Win	7–1	Stephen Martin	TKO (doctor stoppage)	Cage Warriors 73	1 November 2014	1	5:00	Newcastle, England	Featherweight debut.
Win	6–1	Conrad Hayes	Submission (triangle armbar)	Cage Warriors 68	3 May 2014	1	3:17	Liverpool, England	Catchweight (141.7 lb) bout; Pimblett missed weight.
Win	5–1	Martin Sheridan	Decision (unanimous)	Cage Warriors 65	1 March 2014	3	5:00	Dublin, Ireland	Catchweight (136.8 lb) bout; Pimblett missed weight.
Loss	4–1	Cameron Else	Technical Submission (anaconda choke)	Cage Warriors 60	5 October 2013	1	0:35	London, England	
Win	4–0	Florian Calin	Decision (unanimous)	Cage Warriors 56	6 July 2013	3	5:00	London, England	
Win	3–0	Jack Drabble	TKO (punches)	OMMAC 17	1 June 2013	1	0:21	London, England	
Win	2–0	Dougie Scott	Submission (flying triangle choke)	Cage Contender: Fight Stars	1 December 2012	1	2:09	Liverpool, England	
Win	1–0	Nathan Thompson	TKO (submission to strikes)	OMMAC 15	16 October 2012	1	1:51	Liverpool, England	Bantamweight debut.

== See also ==
- List of current UFC fighters
- List of male mixed martial artists

Awards and achievements
Vacant Title last held by Alex Enlund	7th Cage Warriors Featherweight Champion; September 10, 2016 – April 1, 2017	Succeeded by Nad Narimani
Awards
Preceded by Brandon Moreno	World MMA Breakthrough Fighter of the Year; 2022	Succeeded by Alex Pereira
Preceded by Dricus du Plessis	World MMA International Fighter of the Year; 1 July 2024 – 31 December 2025	Incumbent
