= Priscila Cachoeira =

Brazilian mixed martial artist

- Born: Priscila Cachoeira Gomes da Silva; August 19, 1988 (age 38); Rio de Janeiro, Brazil
- Other names: Zombie Girl
- Height: 5 ft 7 in (1.70 m)
- Weight: 125 lb (57 kg; 8.9 st)
- Division: Flyweight
- Reach: 65 in (165 cm)
- Fighting out of: Rio de Janeiro, Brazil
- Team: Paranà Vale Tudo (until 2020); Team Figueiredo (2021–present)
- Rank: Purple belt in Brazilian Jiu-Jitsu
- Years active: 2016–present

Mixed martial arts record
- Total: 23
- Wins: 13
- By knockout: 8
- By decision: 5
- Losses: 10
- By knockout: 2
- By submission: 5
- By decision: 3

Other information
- Mixed martial arts record from Sherdog

Priscila Cachoeira Gomes da Silva (born 19 August 1988) is a Brazilian mixed martial artist. She currently competes in the women's Flyweight division in the Ultimate Fighting Championship.

== Personal life ==
Cachoeira had a troubled childhood growing up. She played volleyball for Fluminense, but was removed from the team. In her youth Cachoeira's father refused to admit that she was his daughter, her brother-in-law sexually molested her, and she discovered that her boyfriend was cheating on her. In her twenties Cachoeira became addicted to crack cocaine, and would spend many years of her life as an addict before her mother finally managed to help her leave her addiction and turn to mixed martial arts.

Cachoeira had a son born in 2013. She was in a relationship with another woman until 2018, when they split up because her partner was spending all her money. While recovering from her knee injury, Cachoeira's training was sponsored by Brazilian football club Vasco da Gama.

In July 2021, news surfaced that Cachoeira's former girlfriend was granted a restraining order against Cachoeira after accusing her of three assaults. Cachoeira denied the accusations and pressed charges against her ex-girlfriend for defamation in turn.

== Mixed martial arts career ==
=== Ultimate Fighting Championship ===
Cachoeira made her UFC debut on February 3, 2018 at UFC Fight Night 125 against Valentina Shevchenko. She lost the fight via rear-naked choke in the second round as Shevchenko thoroughly dominated Cachoeira, outstriking her 230-3. Referee Mario Yamasaki was harshly criticized by UFC president Dana White for not stopping the fight sooner.

Cachoeira suffered a knee injury in the fight with Shevchenko which required surgery, and kept her out of the sport for more than a year.

Cachoeira's second UFC fight came on March 15, 2019 against Molly McCann at UFC Fight Night 147. She lost the fight via unanimous decision.

A flyweight bout between Luana Carolina and Yanan Wu was scheduled for UFC 237. However it was reported on April 22, 2019 that Wu had pulled out of the event due to injury and she was replaced by Cachoeira. Carolina went on to defeat Cachoeira by unanimous decision.

Cachoeira was expected to face Ariane Lipski at UFC on ESPN+ 22. However, Cachoeira was removed from the card after testing positive for a banned substance that was collected on October 12, 2019 during an out-of-competition urine sample. In turn, Lipski was rescheduled to fight at UFC Fight Night 180 against Veronica Macedo on December 21, 2019. Cachoeira was suspended by USADA for four months for testing positive for (diuretic), hydrochlorothiazide (HCTZ) and its metabolites chlorothiazide and 4amino-6chloro-1,3-benzenedisulfonamide (ACB). She was eligible to fight again on February 12, 2020.

Cachoeira faced Shana Dobson on February 23, 2020 at UFC Fight Night 168. She won the fight via knockout in the first round. The win also recorded the fastest finish in UFC Women's Flyweight history. This win earned her a Performance of the Night award.

Cachoeira was expected to face Cortney Casey on October 31, 2020 at UFC Fight Night 181. However the bout was called off the day of the weigh-ins as Cachoeira had issues cutting weight.

Cachoeira faced Gina Mazany on May 15, 2021 at UFC 262. She won the bout via TKO at the end of the second round.

Cachoeira faced Gillian Robertson on December 11, 2021 at UFC 269. At the weigh-ins, Cachoeira weighed in at 129 pounds, three pounds over the flyweight non-title fight limit. The bout proceeded at catchweight with Cachoeira fined 30% of her purse, which went to her opponent Robertson. Robertson won the fight via a rear-naked choke submission in the first round. Cachoeira faced much criticism and backlash from fans and media after she gouged Robertson's eyes in an attempt to escape a rear-naked choke.

Cachoeira faced Ji Yeon Kim on February 26, 2022 at UFC Fight Night 202. She won the bout via controversial unanimous decision. 14 out 15 media scored Kim as the winner of the fight. Along with Kim, Cachoeira was awarded the Fight of the Night bonus award.

Cachoeira was scheduled to faced Ariane Lipski on August 6, 2022 at UFC on ESPN 40. At the weigh-ins, Lipski weighed in at 128.5 pounds, two and a half pounds over the flyweight non-title fight limit. The bout is expected to proceed at catchweight with Lipski fined 20% of her purse, which will go to Cachoeira, but they were rescheduled to UFC on ESPN 41 in a bantamweight bout after Lipski was not medically cleared. Cachoeira won the fight via technical knockout.

Cachoeira was scheduled to face Sijara Eubanks on January 14, 2023, at UFC Fight Night 217. However, Eubanks withdrew from the bout on the day of the weigh-ins due to complications related to her weight cut.

Cachoeira was scheduled to face Karine Silva on April 22, 2023 at UFC Fight Night 222. At the weigh-ins, Cachoeira weighed in at 130 pounds, four pounds over the women's flyweight non-title fight limit with the bout in turn being scrapped.

Cachoeira was scheduled to face Joanne Wood at UFC 291 on July 29, 2023. However, Wood pulled out in mid-July due to undisclosed reasons and was replaced by Miranda Maverick. She lost via an armbar submission in the third round.

Cachoeira faced Jasmine Jasudavicius on January 20, 2024, at UFC 297. She lost by submission in the third round.

Cachoeira faced Josiane Nunes on March 15, 2025 at UFC Fight Night 254. She won the fight by knockout via an uppercut in the first round. This fight earned her another Performance of the Night award.

Replacing Mayra Bueno Silva who pulled out due to unknown reasons, Cachoeira faced Joselyne Edwards on August 9, 2025 at UFC on ESPN 72. Cachoeira lost the fight by knockout in the first round.

Cachoeira faced Klaudia Syguła on February 7, 2026, at UFC Fight Night 266. She lost the fight by unanimous decision.

Cachoeira faced Chelsea Chandler on June 6, 2026 at UFC Fight Night 278. She lost the fight via an armbar submission in the first round.

Cachoeira faced Nina Nikolija Milošević on November 7, 2026, at UFC Fight Night 293. She lost the fight by technical knockout in the second round.

== Championships and achievements ==
=== Mixed martial arts ===
- Ultimate Fighting Championship
  - Performance of the Night (Two times) vs. Shana Dobson and Josiane Nunes
  - Fight of the Night (One time) vs. Ji Yeon Kim
  - Fastest knockout in UFC Women's Flyweight division history (0:40) vs. Shana Dobson
  - Fastest finish in UFC Women's Flyweight division history (0:40) vs. Shana Dobson

== Mixed martial arts record ==
Professional record breakdown
23 matches	13 wins	10 losses
By knockout	8	2
By submission	0	5
By decision	5	3

Res.	Record	Opponent	Method	Event	Date	Round	Time	Location	Notes
Loss	13–10	Nina Nikolija Milošević	TKO (elbows and punches)	UFC Fight Night: Cortes-Acosta vs. Walker	November 7, 2026	2	3:40	Las Vegas, Nevada, United States	
Loss	13–9	Chelsea Chandler	Submission (armbar)	UFC Fight Night: Muhammad vs. Bonfim	June 6, 2026	1	3:42	Las Vegas, Nevada, United States	
Loss	13–8	Klaudia Syguła	Decision (unanimous)	UFC Fight Night: Bautista vs. Oliveira	February 7, 2026	3	5:00	Las Vegas, Nevada, United States	
Loss	13–7	Joselyne Edwards	KO (punches)	UFC on ESPN: Dolidze vs. Hernandez	August 9, 2025	1	2:24	Las Vegas, Nevada, United States	
Win	13–6	Josiane Nunes	KO (punch)	UFC Fight Night: Vettori vs. Dolidze 2	March 15, 2025	1	2:46	Las Vegas, Nevada, United States	Performance of the Night.
Loss	12–6	Jasmine Jasudavicius	Submission (anaconda choke)	UFC 297	January 20, 2024	3	4:21	Toronto, Ontario, Canada	Return to Bantamweight.
Loss	12–5	Miranda Maverick	Submission (armbar)	UFC 291	July 29, 2023	3	2:11	Salt Lake City, Utah, United States	
Win	12–4	Ariane Lipski	TKO (punches)	UFC on ESPN: Vera vs. Cruz	August 13, 2022	1	1:05	San Diego, California, United States	Bantamweight bout.
Win	11–4	Kim Ji-yeon	Decision (unanimous)	UFC Fight Night: Makhachev vs. Green	February 26, 2022	3	5:00	Las Vegas, Nevada, United States	Fight of the Night.
Loss	10–4	Gillian Robertson	Submission (rear-naked choke)	UFC 269	December 11, 2021	1	4:59	Las Vegas, Nevada, United States	Catchweight (129 lb) bout; Cachoeira missed weight.
Win	10–3	Gina Mazany	TKO (punches)	UFC 262	May 15, 2021	2	4:51	Houston, Texas, United States	
Win	9–3	Shana Dobson	KO (punch)	UFC Fight Night: Felder vs. Hooker	February 23, 2020	1	0:40	Auckland, New Zealand	Performance of the Night.
Loss	8–3	Luana Carolina	Decision (unanimous)	UFC 237	May 11, 2019	3	5:00	Rio de Janeiro, Brazil	
Loss	8–2	Molly McCann	Decision (unanimous)	UFC Fight Night: Till vs. Masvidal	March 16, 2019	3	5:00	London, England	
Loss	8–1	Valentina Shevchenko	Submission (rear-naked choke)	UFC Fight Night: Machida vs. Anders	February 3, 2018	2	4:25	Belém, Brazil	
Win	8–0	Rosy Duarte	TKO (punches)	Hipnose Fight Night 3	September 7, 2017	2	4:54	Angra dos Reis, Brazil	Bantamweight bout.
Win	7–0	Marta Souza	Decision (majority)	Curitiba Top Fight 11	July 1, 2017	3	5:00	Curitiba, Brazil	Return to Flyweight.
Win	6–0	Karoline Martins Moreira	TKO (punches)	CUFA Fight Festival 5	May 25, 2017	1	0:49	Rio de Janeiro, Brazil	Catchweight (130 lb) bout.
Win	5–0	Laisa Coimbra	KO (punches)	Curitiba Top Fight 10	February 24, 2017	1	1:09	Curitiba, Brazil	
Win	4–0	Alexandra de Cássia	KO (punches)	CUFA Fight Festival 4	December 16, 2016	2	2:50	Rio de Janeiro, Brazil	Bantamweight debut.
Win	3–0	Amanda Torres Sardinha	Decision (unanimous)	X-Force MMA 4	September 17, 2016	3	5:00	Macaé, Brazil	Catchweight (121 lb) bout.
Win	2–0	Paula Baack	Decision (unanimous)	Hipnose Fight Night 2	August 13, 2016	3	5:00	Angra dos Reis, Brazil	Flyweight debut.
Win	1–0	Cleudilene Costa	Decision (unanimous)	Your Chance 1	June 11, 2016	3	5:00	Rio de Janeiro, Brazil	Catchweight (121 lb) bout.

== See also ==
- List of current UFC fighters
- List of female mixed martial artists
