= Tom Aspinall =

English mixed martial artist (born 1993)

- Born: Thomas Paul Aspinall; 11 April 1993 (age 33); Salford, Greater Manchester, England
- Height: 6 ft 5 in (196 cm)
- Weight: 255 lb (116 kg; 18 st 3 lb)
- Division: Heavyweight (2014-2026)
- Reach: 78 in (198 cm)
- Fighting out of: Salford, Lancashire, England
- Team: Team Kaobon; Aspinall BJJ (2005–2026)
- Rank: Black belt in Brazilian Jiu-Jitsu
- Years active: 2014–present

Professional boxing record
- Total: 1
- Wins: 1
- By knockout: 1

Mixed martial arts record
- Total: 19
- Wins: 15
- By knockout: 12
- By submission: 3
- Losses: 3
- By knockout: 1
- By submission: 1
- By disqualification: 1
- No contests: 1

Other information
- Boxing record from BoxRec
- Mixed martial arts record from Sherdog

YouTube information
- Channel: Tom Aspinall Official
- Subscribers: 649 thousand
- Views: 189.84 million
- Last updated: 24 May 2026

Thomas Paul Aspinall (born 11 April 1993) is an English professional mixed martial artist. He competes in the Heavyweight division of the Ultimate Fighting Championship (UFC), where he is the former UFC Heavyweight Champion. As of 19 September 2026, he is #1 in the Meta UFC heavyweight rankings and as of 17 November 2026, he is #9 in the UFC men's pound-for-pound rankings.

== Background ==
Thomas Paul Aspinall was born on 11 April 1993 in Salford, in the Greater Manchester ceremonial county of North West England. He followed his father's footsteps by beginning to train martial arts when he was seven years old at the Leigh Self Defence Studio in Leigh. After being trained in catch wrestling and boxing, Aspinall transitioned to jiu-jitsu. He has won the British Open in Brazilian jiu-jitsu in all belt classes except black belt. After his father became the jiu-jitsu instructor of Team Kaobon, Aspinall grew interested in mixed martial arts and transitioned into the sport. In the year after completing school at age 16, Aspinall grew from 5 feet 8 inches (1.73 m) to 6 feet 5 inches (1.96 m), causing intense growing pains.

== Mixed martial arts career ==
=== Early career ===
At age 18, Aspinall had his first amateur fight. He posted a record of nine wins and no losses as an amateur. All but one of his wins came via knockout or submission. He made his professional debut at MMA Versus UK and later fought at BAMMA, where he amassed a record of 4 wins and 2 losses. He has also fought at Full Contact Contender in between.

Aspinall signed a five-fight contract with Cage Warriors after a 2.5-year hiatus from professional mixed martial arts. Aspinall was offered a contract by the Ultimate Fighting Championship also, but did not feel ready for the organisation and subsequently turned it down. After two fast finishes in Cage Warriors he eventually signed to the UFC.

=== Ultimate Fighting Championship ===
Aspinall was originally scheduled to make his promotional debut against Raphael Pessoa at UFC Fight Night: Woodley vs. Edwards on March 21, 2020. However, Pessoa withdrew from the bout citing an injury and was replaced by Jake Collier, but the event was cancelled due to the COVID-19 pandemic. Subsequently, the pairing was left intact and took place on July 25, 2020, at UFC on ESPN 14. He won the fight via technical knockout in round one. This win earned him the Performance of the Night award.

Aspinall's second UFC appearance was expected to be against Serghei Spivac at UFC Fight Night: Moraes vs. Sandhagen on October 11, 2020. However, Spivak withdrew from the bout for undisclosed reasons and he was replaced by promotional newcomer Alan Baudot. Aspinall won the fight via first-round technical knockout.

Aspinall next faced Andrei Arlovski at UFC Fight Night: Blaydes vs. Lewis on 20 February 2021. He won the fight via a submission in round two. This win earned him the Performance of the Night award.

Aspinall was expected to face Sergei Pavlovich on 4 September 2021, at UFC Fight Night 191. However, Pavlovich was removed from the card in late-August due to alleged visa issues which restricted his ability to travel and was replaced by Serghei Spivac. Aspinall won the fight via technical knockout in round one. The win earned Aspinall his third Performance of the Night bonus award.

Aspinall was scheduled to face Shamil Abdurakhimov on 19 March 2022, at UFC Fight Night 204. However, on 21 January 2022, it was announced that Aspinall would instead face Alexander Volkov. Aspinall won the fight via straight armbar submission in round one. With this win, he received the Performance of the Night award.

Aspinall faced Curtis Blaydes on 23 July 2022, at UFC Fight Night 208. He lost the fight by technical knockout 15 seconds into the first round after being rendered unable to continue due to a knee injury.

After a year off due to his injury, Aspinall returned to face Marcin Tybura on 22 July 2023, at UFC Fight Night 224. He won the fight via TKO just over a minute into the first round. With this win, he received his fifth Performance of the Night bonus award.

==== UFC Heavyweight Champion ====
On two weeks' notice, Aspinall faced Sergei Pavlovich for the Interim UFC Heavyweight Championship on 11 November 2023, at UFC 295 due to Jon Jones becoming injured and his fight against Stipe Miocic being cancelled. He won by first-round knockout in a little over a minute and the victory earned him his sixth Performance of the Night award.

Aspinall defended his interim title against Curtis Blaydes in a rematch on 27 July 2024 at UFC 304. He won the fight by knockout one minute into the first round. This fight earned him a $100,000 Performance of the Night award.

Aspinall served as the backup fighter for the UFC Heavyweight Championship bout between then current champion Jon Jones and Stipe Miocic on 16 November 2024 at UFC 309.

At the post-fight press conference of UFC on ABC: Hill vs. Rountree Jr. on 21 June 2025, UFC CEO Dana White announced that UFC Heavyweight Champion Jon Jones (also former UFC Light Heavyweight Champion) had retired from mixed martial arts competition and that Aspinall was promoted as the new undisputed champion as a result.

Aspinall faced former interim champion Ciryl Gane on 25 October 2025 at UFC 321. During the first round, Gane poked Aspinall in both of his eyes, rendering Aspinall unable to continue. The fight was declared a no contest.

On 29 December, Aspinall announced he was moving forward with multiple eye surgeries, expected to be completed by mid-January, with no return timeline provided.

On September 14, 2026, Aspinall vacated his heavyweight title due to ongoing complications from eye injuries.

== Fighting style ==
Aspinall's fighting style is characterized by aggression, speed, and finishing ability. Aspinall holds the UFC record for shortest average fight time among all fighters, and has the most strikes landed per minute out of any heavyweight fighter. Across his professional career, Aspinall has never been to a decision, and only three of his fights have ever made it to a second round. All but one of Aspinall's professional wins has been by first-round finish. Combat sports analyst Jack Slack described Aspinall's speed as "almost unfathomable in heavyweight MMA." Slack has praised Aspinall's use of false entries to bait an opponent's reaction as well as his effective one-two, but criticized his lack of variety on the feet, reluctance to use his "terrific" body jab, and obvious tendency to hold his chin high.

== Personal life ==
Aspinall was born to parents Tracey and Andy and was raised in Atherton, Greater Manchester. His wife is of Polish descent. He has three sons, two of which are twins. Aspinall speaks minimal Polish and states an affinity to Poland due to his wife and children's Polish background.

Aspinall is a Manchester City supporter due to his son supporting the team. He also has expressed a dream to one day fight at Old Trafford.

In 2025, Aspinall became a brand ambassador, along with Alex Pereira and Johnny Walker, as part of the multi-year branding deal between the UFC and Spribe.

== Championships and accomplishments ==
=== Mixed martial arts ===
- Ultimate Fighting Championship
  - UFC Heavyweight Champion (One time)
  - Interim UFC Heavyweight Champion (One time)
    - One successful title defence
  - Performance of the Night (Seven times) vs. Jake Collier, Andrei Arlovski, Serghei Spivac, Alexander Volkov, Marcin Tybura, Sergei Pavlovich & Curtis Blaydes
    - Tied (Donald Cerrone, Ovince Saint Preux, Conor McGregor, Carlos Prates & Song Yadong) for fourth most Performance of the Night awards in UFC history (7)
    - Tied (Mark Hunt & Travis Browne) for fourth-most post-fight bonuses in UFC Heavyweight division history (7)
  - Second shortest average fight time in UFC history (2:18) (behind Terrance McKinney)
  - Fourth most knockdowns per 15 minutes in UFC history (3.27)
  - Fourth highest number of significant strikes landed per minute in UFC history (7.63)
    - Highest number of significant strikes landed per minute in UFC Heavyweight division history (7.63)
  - Third largest striking differential in UFC history (4.01)
  - Least bottom position time in UFC history (0:01)
  - Lowest bottom position percentage in UFC history (0.07%)
  - UFC.com Awards
    - 2020: Ranked #9 Newcomer of the Year
    - 2022: Ranked #3 Submission of the Year vs. Alexander Volkov
    - 2023: Ranked #6 Fighter of the Year, Ranked #8 Upset of the Year & Ranked #6 Knockout of the Year vs. Sergei Pavlovich
- Sherdog
  - 2023 Breakthrough Fighter of the Year
- Violent Money TV
  - VMTV UK MMA Male Knockout of the Year 2023
  - VMTV UK MMA Fighter of the Year 2024
- World MMA Awards
  - 2024 Breakthrough Fighter of the Year
  - 2024 Comeback of the Year
- MMA Junkie
  - 2023 Comeback Fighter of the Year
- MMA Fighting
  - 2023 First Team MMA All-Star
- MMA Mania
  - 2023 #3 Ranked Fighter of the Year

== Mixed martial arts record ==
Professional record breakdown
19 matches	15 wins	3 losses
By knockout	12	1
By submission	3	1
By disqualification	0	1
No contests	1	

Res.	Record	Opponent	Method	Event	Date	Round	Time	Location	Notes
NC	15–3 (1)	Ciryl Gane	NC (accidental eye poke)	UFC 321	25 October 2025	1	4:35	Abu Dhabi, United Arab Emirates	Retained the UFC Heavyweight Championship. Accidental eye poke rendered Aspinall unable to continue. Later vacated the title on 14 September 2026 due to ongoing complications from eye injuries.
Win	15–3	Curtis Blaydes	KO (punches)	UFC 304	27 July 2024	1	1:00	Manchester, England	Defended the interim UFC Heavyweight Championship. Performance of the Night. Promoted to undisputed champion on 21 June 2025.
Win	14–3	Sergei Pavlovich	KO (punches)	UFC 295	11 November 2023	1	1:09	New York City, New York, United States	Won the interim UFC Heavyweight Championship. Performance of the Night.
Win	13–3	Marcin Tybura	TKO (elbow and punches)	UFC Fight Night: Aspinall vs. Tybura	22 July 2023	1	1:13	London, England	Performance of the Night.
Loss	12–3	Curtis Blaydes	TKO (knee injury)	UFC Fight Night: Blaydes vs. Aspinall	23 July 2022	1	0:15	London, England	
Win	12–2	Alexander Volkov	Submission (straight armbar)	UFC Fight Night: Volkov vs. Aspinall	19 March 2022	1	3:45	London, England	Performance of the Night.
Win	11–2	Serghei Spivac	TKO (elbow and punches)	UFC Fight Night: Brunson vs. Till	4 September 2021	1	2:30	Las Vegas, Nevada, United States	Performance of the Night.
Win	10–2	Andrei Arlovski	Submission (rear-naked choke)	UFC Fight Night: Blaydes vs. Lewis	20 February 2021	2	1:09	Las Vegas, Nevada, United States	Performance of the Night.
Win	9–2	Alan Baudot	TKO (elbows and punches)	UFC Fight Night: Moraes vs. Sandhagen	10 October 2020	1	1:35	Abu Dhabi, United Arab Emirates	
Win	8–2	Jake Collier	TKO (knee and punches)	UFC on ESPN: Whittaker vs. Till	26 July 2020	1	0:45	Abu Dhabi, United Arab Emirates	Performance of the Night.
Win	7–2	Mickael Ben Hamouda	TKO (punches)	Cage Warriors 107	28 September 2019	1	0:56	Liverpool, England	
Win	6–2	Sofiane Boukichou	TKO (leg injury)	Cage Warriors 101	16 February 2019	1	1:21	Liverpool, England	
Win	5–2	Kamil Bazelak	KO (punch)	Full Contact Contender 16	18 June 2016	1	1:16	Bolton, England	
Loss	4–2	Łukasz Parobiec	DQ (illegal downward elbow)	BAMMA 25	14 May 2016	2	3:33	Birmingham, England	
Win	4–1	Adrian Ruskac	TKO (punches)	Full Contact Contender 15	5 March 2016	1	1:05	Bolton, England	
Loss	3–1	Stuart Austin	Submission (heel hook)	BAMMA 21	13 June 2015	2	3:59	Birmingham, England	
Win	3–0	Satisch Jhamai	TKO (punches)	BAMMA 19	28 March 2015	1	0:09	Blackpool, England	
Win	2–0	Ricky King	Submission (heel hook)	BAMMA 18	21 February 2015	1	0:49	Wolverhampton, England	
Win	1–0	Michał Piszczek	TKO (submission to punches)	MMA Versus UK: Empire Rises	13 December 2014	1	0:15	Manchester, England	Heavyweight debut.

=== Amateur mixed martial arts record (incomplete) ===
Amateur record breakdown		
9 matches	9 wins	0 losses
By knockout	5	0
By submission	3	0
By decision	1	0

Res.	Record	Opponent	Method	Event	Date	Round	Time	Location	Notes
Win	9–0	Liam Cawley	Submission (arm-triangle choke)	Shinobi War 2	May 31, 2014	1	0:43	Deeside Leisure Centre, Queensferry, Clwyd, Wales	
Win	5–0	Tom Bankevic	KO (punch)	Full Contact Contender 9	March 22, 2014	1	0:14	Reebok Stadium Premier Suite, Bolton, Greater Manchester, England	
Win	4–0	Ryan Hennessey	KO (punches)	OMMAC 20	March 1, 2014	1	0:06	Liverpool Olympia, Liverpool, Merseyside, England	
Win	3–0	Shawn Kenny	Decision (unanimous)	OMMAC 18	September 8, 2013	3	3:00	Liverpool Olympia, Liverpool, Merseyside, England	
Win	2–0	Kristan Bircher	Submission (arm triangle choke)	OMMAC 16	March 2, 2013	1	0:31	Liverpool Olympia, Liverpool, Merseyside, England	
Win	1–0	Alan Harper	Submission (brabo choke)	Fight-Stars 3	May 23, 2010	1	1:38	Oceana, Wolverhampton, England	

== Professional boxing record ==
1 fight	1 win	0 losses
By knockout	1	0

No.	Result	Record	Opponent	Type	Round, time	Date	Location	Notes
1	Win	1–0	Tamas Bajzath	KO	1 (4), 1:24	24 Jun 2017	Wythenshawe Forum, Manchester, England	

== Pay-per-view bouts ==
No.	Event	Fight	Date	Venue	City	PPV Buys
1.	UFC 321	Aspinall vs. Gane	October 25, 2025	Etihad Arena	Abu Dhabi, United Arab Emirates	Not Disclosed

== See also ==
- List of current UFC fighters
- List of male mixed martial artists

Achievements
Preceded by Ciryl Gane	7th UFC Heavyweight Interim Champion; 11 November 2023 – 21 June 2025	Vacant Title next held by Ciryl Gane
Preceded by Jon Jones; Vacated	24th UFC Heavyweight Champion; 21 June 2025 – 14 September 2026; Promoted then vacated	Succeeded by Ciryl Gane; Promoted
