= Sergei Pavlovich =

Russian mixed martial artist (born 1992)

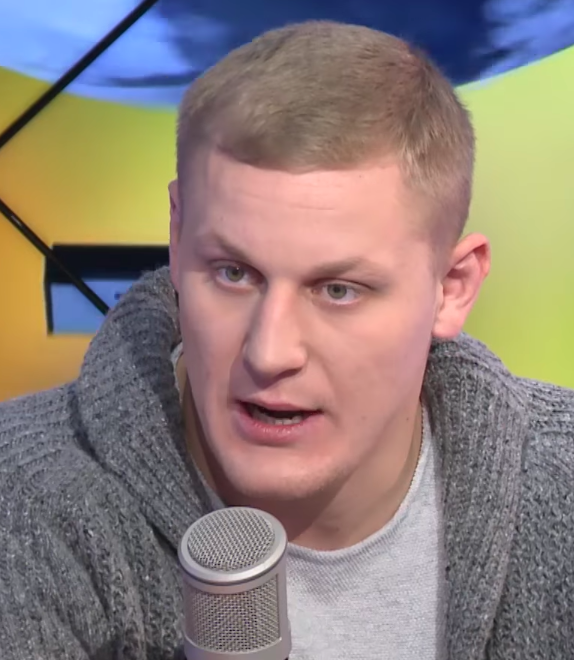
- Pavlovich in 2018
- Born: Sergei Vladimirovich Pavlovich; 13 May 1992 (age 34); Orlovsky, Rostov Oblast, Russia
- Native name: Сергей Владимирович Павлович
- Height: 6 ft 3 in (191 cm)
- Weight: 257 lb (117 kg; 18 st 5 lb)
- Division: Heavyweight
- Reach: 84 in (213 cm)
- Stance: Orthodox
- Fighting out of: Moscow, Russia
- Team: Eagles MMA Moscow
- Years active: 2014–present

Mixed martial arts record
- Total: 24
- Wins: 21
- By knockout: 16
- By decision: 5
- Losses: 3
- By knockout: 2
- By decision: 1

Other information
- Mixed martial arts record from Sherdog

Sergei Vladimirovich Pavlovich (Russian: Сергей Владимирович Павлович; born 13 May 1992) is a Russian professional mixed martial artist. Pavlovich currently competes in the Heavyweight division of the Ultimate Fighting Championship (UFC). A one-time champion of Russia in Combat Kung Fu. He was also the former Fight Nights Global heavyweight champion. As of October 24, 2026, he is #4 in the Meta UFC heavyweight rankings.

== Background ==
Sergei was born in 1992 in the village of Orlovsky, Rostov Oblast. At the age of five Pavlovich began to engage in Greco-Roman wrestling under the guidance of coach Alexander Fedorovich Aloyan. He trained specifically in wrestling until the 12th grade. After serving in the army, he began to train in Combat Sambo where he won most of his competitions.

He was invited to train for the Russian Olympic team but declined because of Sambo tournaments that he had at the time. He is believed to be the active UFC fighter with the largest ape index of 1.115.

== Mixed martial arts career ==
=== Fight Nights Global ===
Pavlovich started his professional MMA career in 2014 under the Fight Nights Global promotion, under which he won 12 fights without suffering a single defeat. On June 2, 2017, in a fight against Mikhail Mokhnatkin, he won the heavyweight title by unanimous decision. On November 19, 2017, he defended his heavyweight title in a fight against Kirill Sidelnikov.

=== Ultimate Fighting Championship ===
Pavlovich made his UFC debut on November 24, 2018 at UFC Fight Night 141 against Alistair Overeem. He lost the fight via TKO in the first round.

Pavlovich faced Marcelo Golm on April 20, 2019, at UFC Fight Night: Overeem vs. Oleinik. He won the fight via knockout. This win earned Performance of the Night award.

Pavlovich faced Maurice Greene on October 26, 2019, at UFC Fight Night 162. He won the fight via knockout in the first round.

Pavlovich was expected to face Ciryl Gane on August 8, 2020, at UFC Fight Night 174. Pavlovich however had to pull out because of an injury.

Pavlovich was expected to face Tom Aspinall on September 4, 2021, at UFC Fight Night 191. However, Pavlovich pulled out a week before the contest due to visa issues and was replaced by Sergey Spivak.

Pavlovich was scheduled to face Tanner Boser on December 4, 2021, at UFC on ESPN 31. However, due to travel issues, the bout was scrapped.

Pavlovich faced Shamil Abdurakhimov on March 19, 2022, at UFC Fight Night 204. He won the fight via technical knockout in round one. With this win, he received the Performance of the Night award.

Pavlovich fought Derrick Lewis on July 30, 2022, at UFC 277. He won the fight via TKO under a minute into the first round, though controversy arose as the stoppage by the referee was considered premature by fighters and fans alike.

Pavlovich faced Tai Tuivasa on December 3, 2022, at UFC on ESPN 42. He won the fight via KO under a minute into the first round. With this win, he received the Performance of the Night award.

Pavlovich faced Curtis Blaydes on April 22, 2023, at UFC Fight Night 222. He won the fight via TKO in the first round. This performance subsequently earned Pavlovich his fourth UFC Performance Of The Night award.

Pavlovich faced Tom Aspinall for the Interim UFC Heavyweight Championship on November 11, 2023, at UFC 295. After some initial exchanges, Pavlovich was caught with a counter right hand and lost the bout via knockout in the first round.

Pavlovich faced Alexander Volkov on June 22, 2024, at UFC on ABC 6. He lost the fight by unanimous decision.

Pavlovich faced Jairzinho Rozenstruik on February 1, 2025 at UFC Fight Night 250. He won the fight by unanimous decision.

Pavlovich faced former LFA Heavyweight Champion Waldo Cortes-Acosta on August 23, 2025 at UFC Fight Night 257. He won the fight by unanimous decision.

Pavlovich faced Tallison Teixeira on May 30, 2026 at UFC Fight Night 277. He won the fight by knockout under a minute into the first round.

Pavlovich is scheduled to face Alex Pereira on December 12, 2026, at UFC 335.

== Championships and accomplishments ==
=== Mixed martial arts ===
- Ultimate Fighting Championship
  - Performance of the Night (Four times) vs. Marcelo Golm, Shamil Abdurakhimov, Tai Tuivasa, and Curtis Blaydes
  - Longest first-round knockout win streak in UFC history (6)
  - Tied (Don Frye) for the second longest knockout win streak in UFC history (6) (behind Chuck Liddell)
- Fight Nights Global
  - Fight Nights Global Heavyweight Champion (One time)
    - One successful title defense
- MMAjunkie.com
  - 2022 December Knockout of the Month vs. Tai Tuivasa
- Fight Matrix
  - 2015 Male Rookie of the Year
  - 2022 Comeback Fighter of the Year
- MMA Fighting
  - 2022 First Team MMA All-Star

=== Wushu Sanda ===
- (gold) Russian Championship (Above 90 kg)

== Mixed martial arts record ==
Professional record breakdown
24 matches	21 wins	3 losses
By knockout	16	2
By decision	5	1

Res.	Record	Opponent	Method	Event	Date	Round	Time	Location	Notes
Win	21–3	Tallison Teixeira	KO (punches)	UFC Fight Night: Song vs. Figueiredo	May 30, 2026	1	0:39	Macau SAR, China	
Win	20–3	Waldo Cortes-Acosta	Decision (unanimous)	UFC Fight Night: Walker vs. Zhang	August 23, 2025	3	5:00	Shanghai, China	
Win	19–3	Jairzinho Rozenstruik	Decision (unanimous)	UFC Fight Night: Adesanya vs. Imavov	February 1, 2025	3	5:00	Riyadh, Saudi Arabia	
Loss	18–3	Alexander Volkov	Decision (unanimous)	UFC on ABC: Whittaker vs. Aliskerov	June 22, 2024	3	5:00	Riyadh, Saudi Arabia	
Loss	18–2	Tom Aspinall	KO (punches)	UFC 295	November 11, 2023	1	1:09	New York City, New York, United States	For the interim UFC Heavyweight Championship.
Win	18–1	Curtis Blaydes	TKO (punches)	UFC Fight Night: Pavlovich vs. Blaydes	April 22, 2023	1	3:08	Las Vegas, Nevada, United States	Performance of the Night.
Win	17–1	Tai Tuivasa	KO (punches)	UFC on ESPN: Thompson vs. Holland	December 3, 2022	1	0:54	Orlando, Florida, United States	Performance of the Night.
Win	16–1	Derrick Lewis	TKO (punches)	UFC 277	July 30, 2022	1	0:55	Dallas, Texas, United States	
Win	15–1	Shamil Abdurakhimov	TKO (punches)	UFC Fight Night: Volkov vs. Aspinall	March 19, 2022	1	4:03	London, England	Performance of the Night.
Win	14–1	Maurice Greene	TKO (punches)	UFC Fight Night: Maia vs. Askren	October 26, 2019	1	2:11	Kallang, Singapore	
Win	13–1	Marcelo Golm	KO (punch)	UFC Fight Night: Overeem vs. Oleinik	April 20, 2019	1	1:06	Saint Petersburg, Russia	Performance of the Night.
Loss	12–1	Alistair Overeem	TKO (punches)	UFC Fight Night: Blaydes vs. Ngannou 2	November 24, 2018	1	4:21	Beijing, China	
Win	12–0	Kirill Sidelnikov	TKO (punches)	Fight Nights Global 79	November 19, 2017	1	2:45	Penza, Russia	Defended the FNG Heavyweight Championship.
Win	11–0	Mikhail Mokhnatkin	Decision (unanimous)	Fight Nights Global 68	June 2, 2017	5	5:00	Saint Petersburg, Russia	Won the FNG Heavyweight Grand Prix and the inaugural FNG Heavyweight Championship.
Win	10–0	Alexei Kudin	Decision (unanimous)	Fight Nights Global 54	November 16, 2016	3	5:00	Saint Petersburg, Russia	FNG Heavyweight Grand Prix Semifinal.
Win	9–0	Akhmedshaikh Gelegaev	TKO (knee and punches)	Fight Nights Global 51	September 25, 2016	1	3:35	Kaspiysk, Russia	
Win	8–0	Chaban Ka	TKO (punches)	Fight Nights Global 50	June 17, 2016	1	1:54	Saint Petersburg, Russia	
Win	7–0	Magomedbag Agaev	Decision (unanimous)	Fight Nights Global 46	April 29, 2016	3	5:00	Moscow, Russia	
Win	6–0	Ruben Wolf	TKO (punches)	Fight Nights Global 43	December 11, 2015	1	2:02	Moscow, Russia	
Win	5–0	Sultan Murtazaliev	TKO (punches)	Fight Nights Global 41	September 25, 2015	1	0:59	Kaspiysk, Russia	
Win	4–0	Vladimir Daineko	KO (punch)	Fight Nights Global 40	July 31, 2015	1	0:24	Sochi, Russia	
Win	3–0	Ilja Škondrič	TKO (punches)	Full Fight 1	May 30, 2015	1	1:15	Banská Bystrica, Slovakia	
Win	2–0	Sergey Buinachev	TKO (punches)	Fight Nights Global 33	March 21, 2015	1	0:20	Moscow, Russia	
Win	1–0	Alexander Derevyanko	TKO (punches)	Fight Nights Global 29	December 20, 2014	1	3:52	Moscow, Russia	Heavyweight debut.

== See also ==
- List of current UFC fighters
- List of male mixed martial artists
