= Molly McCann =

English mixed martial artist and boxer (born 1990)

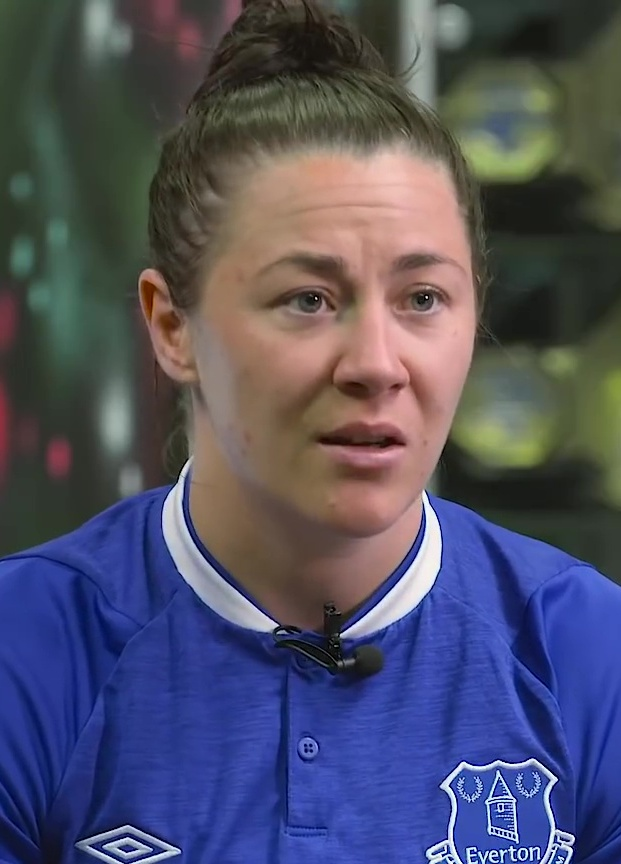
- McCann in 2018
- Born: Molly Maria McCann Pearson; 4 May 1990 (age 36); Liverpool, England
- Other names: Meatball
- Height: 5 ft 4 in (163 cm)
- Weight: 116 lb (53 kg; 8 st 4 lb)
- Division: Strawweight (2024-2025); Flyweight (2015–2023)
- Reach: 62 in (157 cm)
- Fighting out of: Liverpool, England
- Team: Next Generation MMA (2013–present)
- Rank: Brown belt in Brazilian Jiu-Jitsu under Paul Rimmer
- Years active: 2015–present

Mixed martial arts record
- Total: 22
- Wins: 14
- By knockout: 6
- By submission: 1
- By decision: 7
- Losses: 8
- By submission: 4
- By decision: 4

Other information
- University: Liverpool John Moores University
- Boxing record from BoxRec
- Mixed martial arts record from Sherdog

Molly Maria McCann Pearson (born 4 May 1990) is an English boxer and former mixed martial artist. She is a former Cage Warriors Flyweight Champion and formerly competed in the women's Flyweight division of the Ultimate Fighting Championship (UFC).

== Early life ==
McCann was born in Liverpool on 4 May 1990. Her father was absent and she was partially raised by her grandmother. She grew up in Liverpool's Norris Green area with two sisters. She went to secondary school at Avonbourne in Bournemouth. Initially, she trained in karate, kickboxing, and Thai boxing before starting boxing around the age of 12. She then played football for five years before starting MMA training in 2013. Despite a life-long affinity with Everton, McCann played for Liverpool, until an ankle ligament injury brought about her football retirement. Upon signing 16-year-old McCann in 2006, Liverpool manager Keith "Cliffy" Cliffe described her as a promising midfielder who liked to push forward. She graduated from Liverpool John Moores University with a degree in sports development and physical education.

== Mixed martial arts career ==
=== Early career ===
McCann fought most of her early MMA career in Liverpool. In her early years as a fighter, she supported herself by working at Subway, which earned her the nickname "Meatball Molly". She fought for the MMA promotion Shock N' Awe, where she won the vacant Shock N' Awe Flyweight Championship and also defended it once. McCann also won the vacant Cage Warriors Fighting Championship Women's Flyweight Championship in 2018 against Bryony Tyrell. After competing on the regional circuit, she amassed a record of 7–1 before signing with the UFC.

=== Ultimate Fighting Championship ===
McCann made her UFC debut on 27 May 2018, against Gillian Robertson at UFC Fight Night: Thompson vs. Till. At the weigh-ins, she weighed in at 127 pounds, a single pound over the flyweight non-title fight limit of 126. She was fined 20% of her purse, which went to Robertson. She lost the fight via a rear-naked choke in round two.

Her second fight came on 15 March 2019, facing Priscila Cachoeira at UFC Fight Night: Till vs. Masvidal. She won the fight via unanimous decision.

McCann faced Ariane Lipski on 22 June 2019 at UFC Fight Night: Moicano vs. Korean Zombie. She won the fight via unanimous decision. Shortly after the fight, McCann signed a new four-fight contract with the UFC.

McCann faced Diana Belbiţă on 18 October 2019 at UFC on ESPN 6. She won the fight via unanimous decision.

McCann was scheduled to face Ashlee Evans-Smith on 21 March 2020 at UFC Fight Night: Woodley vs. Edwards. Due to the COVID-19 pandemic, the event was eventually postponed. Instead, McCann faced Taila Santos on 16 July 2020 at UFC on ESPN: Kattar vs. Ige. She lost the fight via unanimous decision.

McCann faced Lara Procópio on 6 February 2021 at UFC Fight Night: Overeem vs. Volkov. She lost the fight via unanimous decision.

McCann faced Ji Yeon Kim on 4 September 2021 at UFC Fight Night 191. She won the fight via unanimous decision. The back-and-forth bout won both contestants the Fight of the Night bonus award.

McCann faced Luana Carolina on 19 March 2022 at UFC Fight Night 204. She won the fight via knockout in round three. With this win, she received the Performance of the Night award.

McCann faced Hannah Goldy on 23 July 2022 at UFC Fight Night 208. She won the fight via technical knockout in round one. This win earned her the Performance of the Night award.

As the first bout of her new eight-fight contract, McCann faced Erin Blanchfield on 12 November 2022 at UFC 281. She lost the fight via a kimura submission in round one. During the fight, McCann only landed 7 strikes in contrast to the 93 strikes landed by Blanchfield.

McCann faced Julija Stoliarenko on 22 July 2023 at UFC Fight Night 224. She lost the fight by armbar submission in the first round.

In her first strawweight bout, McCann faced Diana Belbiţă in a rematch on 3 February 2024 at UFC Fight Night 235. She won the fight via an armbar in round one. This fight earned her the Performance of the Night award.

McCann faced Bruna Brasil on 27 July 2024, at UFC 304. She lost the fight by unanimous decision.

McCann was scheduled to face Istela Nunes on 22 March 2025 at UFC Fight Night 255. However, Nunes withdrew from the fight due to visa issues and was replaced by promotional newcomer Alexia Thainara. She lost the fight via a rear-naked choke submission in the first round and announced her retirement from mixed martial arts competition after the bout.

== Professional grappling career ==
McCann made her Polaris debut against Julia Scardone at Polaris 26 on 4 November 2023. She won the match by submission with an armbar.

== Professional boxing career ==
On 3 July 2025, it had announced that McCann is signed with Matchroom Boxing.

She made her professional boxing debut at Windsor Park in Belfast, Northern Ireland, on 13 September 2025 against Kate Radomska. McCann knocked her opponent to the canvas in the fifth round and went on to win by stoppage when Radomska's corner threw in the towel in the sixth and final round.

In her second fight, McCann defeated Ebonie Cotton on points, 58–56, over six rounds at the National Exhibition Centre in Birmingham on 29 November 2025.

In her third fight, McCann defeated Beata Dudek on points, 60–55, over six rounds at the Nottingham Arena in Nottingham on 21 February 2026.

McCann defeated Ashleigh Johnson on points, 78–74, in an eight rounder at Liverpool Arena on 18 April 2026.

She faced Sylwia Doligala at Croke Park in Dublin, Ireland, on 5 September 2026. McCann won the eight-round bout by unanimous decision.

== Personal life ==
McCann struggled with her sexuality in her youth. She came out publicly as lesbian at 25 after stating, "I absolutely ran from it until the wheels fell off, until I couldn't run no more." Having gone public with their relationship in 2024, McCann and girlfriend, Fran Parman, got engaged on 6 September 2026.

McCann is a close friend of fellow Liverpudlian mixed martial artist Paddy Pimblett and a supporter of Everton and Celtic. She describes herself as a socialist and a Labour supporter. She is an opponent of the Conservative Party, due to her opinion that they had a negative effect on Liverpool and the working class in general, and on 23 July 2022, she led the crowd at the O2 Arena in a chant of "fuck the tories".

McCann and Irish former boxer Katie Taylor are cousins. Three of her grandparents are from Ireland.

== Championships and accomplishments ==
=== Mixed martial arts ===
- Ultimate Fighting Championship
  - Fight of the Night (One time) vs. Ji Yeon Kim
  - Performance of the Night (Three times) Luana Carolina, Hannah Goldy, and Diana Belbiţă
    - Tied (Carli Judice) for most Post-Fight bonuses in UFC Women's Flyweight division history (3)
  - UFC Honors Awards
    - 2022: President's Choice Performance of the Year Nominee vs. Luana Carolina & Fan's Choice Knockout of the Year Nominee vs. Luana Carolina
  - UFC.com Awards
    - 2022: Ranked #3 Knockout of the Year vs. Luana Carolina
- Cage Warriors Fighting Championship
  - Cage Warriors Fighting Championship Women's Flyweight Champion (One time)
- MMA Junkie
  - 2022 March Knockout of the Month vs. Luana Carolina
- MMA Fighting
  - 2022 First Team MMA All-Star

== Mixed martial arts record ==
Professional record breakdown
22 matches	14 wins	8 losses
By knockout	6	0
By submission	1	4
By decision	7	4

Res.	Record	Opponent	Method	Event	Date	Round	Time	Location	Notes
Loss	14–8	Alexia Thainara	Submission (rear-naked choke)	UFC Fight Night: Edwards vs. Brady	March 22, 2025	1	4:32	London, England	
Loss	14–7	Bruna Brasil	Decision (unanimous)	UFC 304	July 27, 2024	3	5:00	Manchester, England	
Win	14–6	Diana Belbiţă	Submission (armbar)	UFC Fight Night: Dolidze vs. Imavov	February 3, 2024	1	4:59	Las Vegas, Nevada, United States	Strawweight debut. Performance of the Night.
Loss	13–6	Julija Stoliarenko	Submission (armbar)	UFC Fight Night: Aspinall vs. Tybura	July 22, 2023	1	1:55	London, England	
Loss	13–5	Erin Blanchfield	Submission (kimura)	UFC 281	November 12, 2022	1	3:37	New York City, New York, United States	
Win	13–4	Hannah Goldy	TKO (spinning back elbow and punches)	UFC Fight Night: Blaydes vs. Aspinall	July 23, 2022	1	3:52	London, England	Performance of the Night.
Win	12–4	Luana Carolina	KO (spinning back elbow)	UFC Fight Night: Volkov vs. Aspinall	March 19, 2022	3	1:52	London, England	Performance of the Night.
Win	11–4	Kim Ji-yeon	Decision (unanimous)	UFC Fight Night: Brunson vs. Till	September 4, 2021	3	5:00	Las Vegas, Nevada, United States	Fight of the Night.
Loss	10–4	Lara Procópio	Decision (unanimous)	UFC Fight Night: Overeem vs. Volkov	February 6, 2021	3	5:00	Las Vegas, Nevada, United States	
Loss	10–3	Taila Santos	Decision (unanimous)	UFC on ESPN: Kattar vs. Ige	July 16, 2020	3	5:00	Abu Dhabi, United Arab Emirates	
Win	10–2	Diana Belbiţă	Decision (unanimous)	UFC on ESPN: Reyes vs. Weidman	October 18, 2019	3	5:00	Boston, Massachusetts, United States	Belbiţă was deducted a point in round 2 for grabbing the cage.
Win	9–2	Ariane Lipski	Decision (unanimous)	UFC Fight Night: Moicano vs. The Korean Zombie	June 22, 2019	3	5:00	Greenville, South Carolina, United States	
Win	8–2	Priscila Cachoeira	Decision (unanimous)	UFC Fight Night: Till vs. Masvidal	March 16, 2019	3	5:00	London, England	
Loss	7–2	Gillian Robertson	Technical Submission (rear-naked choke)	UFC Fight Night: Thompson vs. Till	May 27, 2018	2	2:05	Liverpool, England	Catchweight (127 lb) bout; McCann missed weight.
Win	7–1	Bryony Tyrell	TKO (punches)	Cage Warriors 90	February 24, 2018	2	1:32	Liverpool, England	Won the inaugural Cage Warriors Women's Flyweight Championship.
Win	6–1	Priscila de Souza	Decision (unanimous)	Cage Warriors 88	October 28, 2017	3	5:00	Liverpool, England	
Win	5–1	Lacey Schuckman	Decision (unanimous)	Cage Warriors 82	April 1, 2017	3	5:00	Liverpool, England	
Win	4–1	Anjela Pink	TKO (knees to the body and punches)	Shinobi War 9	November 26, 2016	1	0:50	Liverpool, England	
Win	3–1	Macicilia Benkhettache	TKO (punches)	Shock n' Awe 23	October 1, 2016	2	1:15	Portsmouth, England	Defended the SNA Women's Flyweight Championship.
Win	2–1	Valérie Domergue	Decision (split)	Shock n' Awe 22	April 1, 2016	3	5:00	Portsmouth, England	Won the vacant SNA Women's Flyweight Championship.
Loss	1–1	Vanessa Melo	Decision (unanimous)	XFC International 12	November 28, 2015	3	5:00	São Paulo, Brazil	Flyweight debut.
Win	1–0	Katy Horlick	TKO (punches)	Shock n' Awe 20	May 30, 2015	1	3:12	Portsmouth, England	Catchweight (132 lb) bout.

== Professional boxing record ==
5 fights	5 wins	0 losses
By knockout	1	0
By decision	4	0

No.	Result	Record	Opponent	Type	Round, time	Date	Location	Notes
5	Win	5–0	Sylwia Doligala	UD	8	5 Sep 2026	Croke Park, Dublin, Ireland	
4	Win	4–0	Ashleigh Johnson	PTS	8	18 Apr 2026	Liverpool Arena, Liverpool, England	
3	Win	3–0	Beata Dudek	PTS	6	21 Feb 2026	Nottingham Arena, Nottingham, England	
2	Win	2–0	Ebonie Cotton	PTS	6	29 Nov 2025	National Exhibition Centre, Birmingham, England	
1	Win	1–0	Kate Radomska	TKO	6 (6), 1:21	13 Sep 2025	Windsor Park, Belfast, Northern Ireland	

== See also ==
- List of female mixed martial artists

== Books ==
- Molly Meatball McCann - Be True To You: A story about coming out, Self-published (30 June 2021), ISBN 979-8-5009-6141-9
