= UFC Fight Night: Blaydes vs. Aspinall =

Mixed martial arts event in 2022

- The poster for UFC Fight Night: Blaydes vs. Aspinall
- Promotion: Ultimate Fighting Championship
- Date: July 23, 2022
- Venue: The O_{2} Arena
- City: London, England
- Attendance: 17,813
- Total gate: $4,320,679

Event chronology
UFC on ABC: Ortega vs. Rodríguez	UFC Fight Night: Blaydes vs. Aspinall	UFC 277: Peña vs. Nunes 2

UFC Fight Night: Blaydes vs. Aspinall (also known as UFC Fight Night 208 and UFC on ESPN+ 66) was a mixed martial arts event produced by the Ultimate Fighting Championship that took place on July 23, 2022, at The O_{2} Arena in London, England.

== Background ==
A heavyweight bout between Curtis Blaydes and Tom Aspinall headlined the event.

Former UFC Welterweight Championship challenger Darren Till and Jack Hermansson were originally expected to headline UFC on ESPN: Hermansson vs. Vettori in December 2020, but the middleweight bout was scrapped after Till was injured. They were then expected to meet at this event. In turn, Till pulled out once again due to injury on July 6 and was replaced by Chris Curtis.

== Results ==
Main card (ESPN+)
Weight class				Method	Round	Time	Notes
Heavyweight	Curtis Blaydes	def.	Tom Aspinall	TKO (knee injury)	1	0:15
Middleweight	Jack Hermansson	def.	Chris Curtis	Decision (unanimous) (29–28, 29–28, 30–27)	3	5:00
Lightweight	Paddy Pimblett	def.	Jordan Leavitt	Submission (rear-naked choke)	2	2:46
Light Heavyweight	Nikita Krylov	def.	Alexander Gustafsson	KO (punches)	1	1:07
Women's Flyweight	Molly McCann	def.	Hannah Goldy	TKO (spinning back elbow and punches)	1	3:52
Light Heavyweight	Volkan Oezdemir	def.	Paul Craig	Decision (unanimous) (30–27, 30–27, 30–27)	3	5:00
Preliminary card (ESPN+)
Lightweight	Ľudovít Klein	def.	Mason Jones	Decision (unanimous) (30–27, 30–27, 30–27)	3	5:00
Lightweight	Marc Diakiese	def.	Damir Hadžović	Decision (unanimous) (30–26, 30–26, 30–27)	3	5:00
Featherweight	Nathaniel Wood	def.	Charles Rosa	Decision (unanimous) (30–26, 30–26, 30–27)	3	5:00
Featherweight	Jonathan Pearce	def.	Makwan Amirkhani	TKO (punches)	2	4:10
Flyweight	Muhammad Mokaev	def.	Charles Johnson	Decision (unanimous) (30–27, 30–27, 30–27)	3	5:00
Lightweight	Jai Herbert	def.	Kyle Nelson	Decision (unanimous) (29–28, 29–28, 29–28)	3	5:00
Women's Flyweight	Victoria Leonardo	def.	Mandy Böhm	Decision (unanimous) (30–27, 30–27, 30–27)	3	5:00
Welterweight	Nicolas Dalby	def.	Cláudio Silva	Decision (unanimous) (29–28, 29–28, 29–27)	3	5:00

== Bonus awards ==
The following fighters received $50,000 bonuses.

- Fight of the Night: No bonus awarded.
- Performance of the Night: Paddy Pimblett, Nikita Krylov, Molly McCann and Jonathan Pearce

== See also ==
- List of UFC events
- List of current UFC fighters
- 2022 in UFC
