= Joanne Wood =

Scottish mixed martial artist (born 1985)

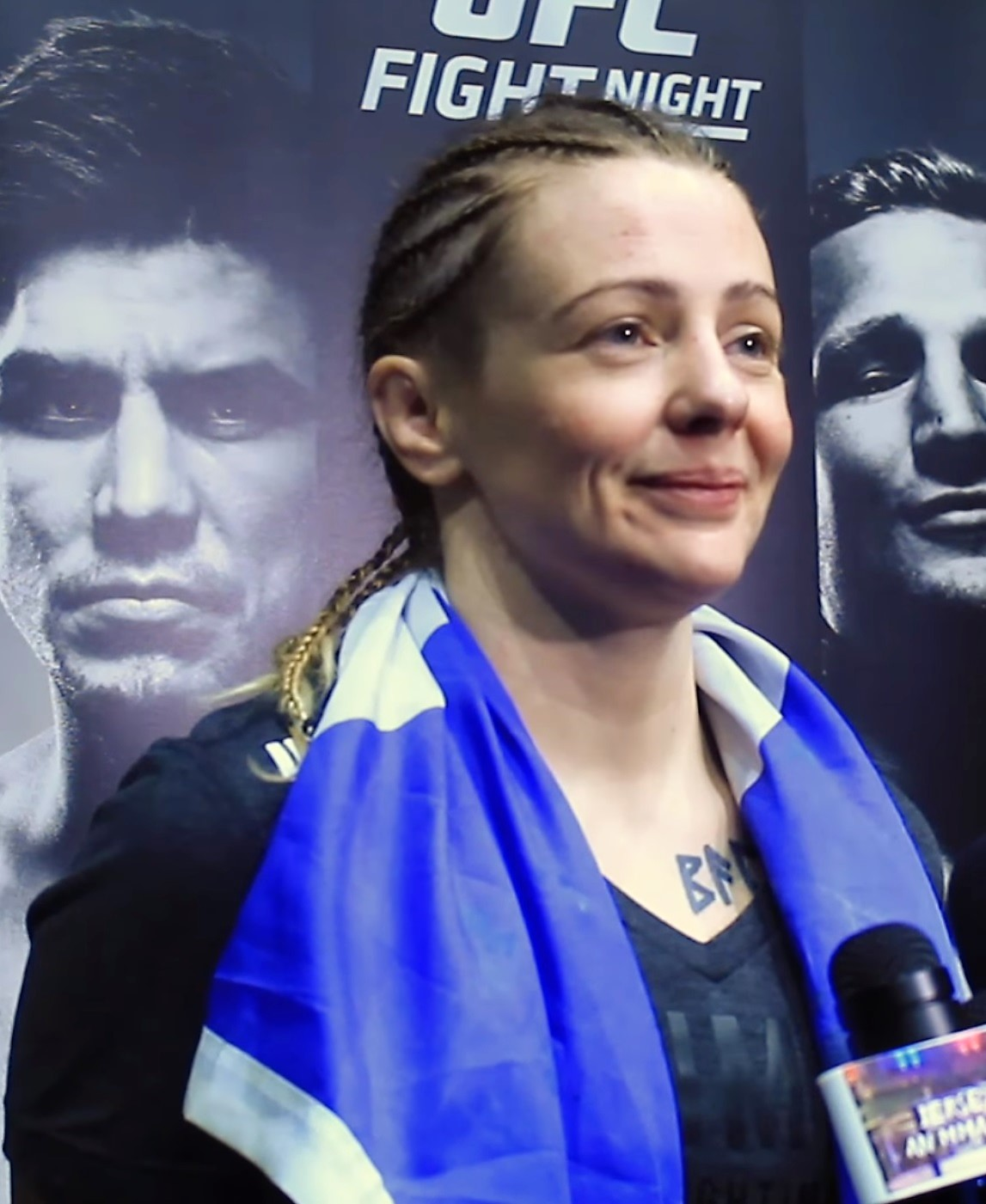
- Wood interviewed at UFC on ESPN+ 1 in 2019
- Born: Joanne Calderwood; 23 December 1985 (age 40); Irvine, Scotland
- Other names: JoJo
- Height: 5 ft 6 in (1.68 m)
- Weight: 125 lb (57 kg; 8 st 13 lb)
- Division: Strawweight (2012–2017); Flyweight (2012, 2016, 2018–2024)
- Reach: 65.5 in (166 cm)
- Style: Kickboxing
- Fighting out of: Glasgow, Scotland
- Team: Dinky Ninjas Fight Team; Tristar Gym (2016–2017); Syndicate MMA (2018–2024)
- Trainer: John Wood, Firas Zahabi, James Doolan and Paul Mcveigh
- Rank: Purple belt in Brazilian Jiu-Jitsu
- Years active: 2012–2024

Kickboxing record
- Total: 21
- Wins: 19
- Losses: 2
- Draws: 0

Mixed martial arts record
- Total: 25
- Wins: 17
- By knockout: 5
- By submission: 1
- By decision: 11
- Losses: 8
- By submission: 5
- By decision: 3

Other information
- Mixed martial arts record from Sherdog

Joanne Wood (née Calderwood; born 23 December 1985) is a Scottish retired professional mixed martial artist and former Muay Thai champion who competed in the Women's Flyweight division of the Ultimate Fighting Championship.

== Biography ==
Wood first started Muay Thai training by accident. When she was 13, her younger brother was meant to go to a class with his friend, who did not turn up. Her mother asked her to go to keep him company. She fell in love with it and begged her mother to allow her to give up competitive swimming to do the two classes each week. This led to doing two sessions a day and spending all of her time training on her own between these sessions.

She worked several jobs growing up, including one after secondary school that involved her helping children and people who were on ventilation machines, monitoring them in the hospital and assisting them when needed. But those were 12-hour shifts, which drained energy and made training difficult. She eventually found another gym, left that job to work at the gym and made a significant commitment to her training. "I had to make a decision if I wanted to keep fighting or stay in my job," she said. "I wanted to keep fighting."

== Kickboxing ==
Wood started in Muay Thai in 2000 and was named STBA Fighter of the year in 2009. She was the current ISKA World Flyweight Champion, IKF European Flyweight Champion, the WKL European Flyweight Champion, and the WBC UK Bantamweight Champion, and was ranked #2 in the world by the World Professional Muaythai Federation. Her final Muay Thai fight was in September 2012 and she had earned a record of 19-2-0.

== Mixed martial arts career ==
Wood is Scotland's first professional female mixed martial artist. She won her debut bout against Noellie Molina via TKO from punches in the first round.

She next fought at India's Super Fight League's third event, SFL 3, against Lena Ovchynnikova. She won the fight via unanimous decision.

Wood then competed at On Top 5, defeating Ainara Mota via TKO from punches.

=== Invicta Fighting Championships and Cage Warriors Fighting Championships ===
She next competed at Invicta Fighting Championships' third event, Invicta FC 3: Penne vs. Sugiyama, against Ashley Cummins on 6 October 2012. Wood won the fight via knockout from a knee to the body in the first round. She was awarded a Knockout of the Night bonus for the victory.

Wood was scheduled to face Bec Hyatt at Invicta FC 4: Esparza vs. Hyatt on 5 January 2013 in Kansas City. However, Hyatt was moved to the main event and Wood was instead matched up against Livia von Plettenberg. Wood won the fight via unanimous decision. This was Wood's debut on the main card of an Invicta FC event.

At Cage Warriors Fighting Championship 53 on 13 April 2013 in Glasgow, Scotland, Wood faced American Sally Krumdiack. She defeated Krumdiack by first-round TKO.

Wood was scheduled to face undefeated BJJ black belt Claudia Gadelha at Invicta FC 6: Coenen vs. Cyborg on 13 July 2013, but Gadelha was moved into a fight against Ayaka Hamasaki after Carla Esparza suffered an injury. Wood was then set to face Sarah Schneider. On 23 June, Schneider also withdrew due to injury and was replaced by Norma Rueda Center. Wood defeated Rueda Center via unanimous decision.

On 7 December 2013, Wood faced Katja Kankaanpää at Invicta FC 7: Honchak vs. Smith. She won the fight via unanimous decision.

=== Ultimate Fighting Championship ===
==== The Ultimate Fighter ====
On 11 December 2013, it was announced that Wood was signed by the UFC along with ten other strawweight fighters to compete on season 20 of The Ultimate Fighter, which would crown the first-ever UFC women's strawweight champion. She defeated Emily Kagan by majority decision after two rounds to advance to the quarterfinals. She was defeated by Rose Namajunas in the quarterfinals via kimura in the second round. Despite her loss in the semifinal round fight, Wood was awarded a $25,000 Fight of the Season bonus for this bout.

==== After TUF ====
Wood's first fight after The Ultimate Fighter was against Seo Hee Ham at The Ultimate Fighter: A Champion Will Be Crowned Finale on 12 December 2014. She won the fight by unanimous decision.

Wood faced promotional newcomer Maryna Moroz on 11 April 2015 at UFC Fight Night 64. She lost the fight as she was quickly submitted via armbar in the first round, making this the first official loss on her professional record.

Wood's next fight was expected to be against Bec Rawlings at UFC Fight Night 72 on 18 July 2015. However, Rawlings pulled out of the bout due to an injury and was replaced by promotional newcomer Cortney Casey. After being rocked by punches and nearly finished in the first round, she rallied back to win the next two rounds to earn a unanimous decision victory.

Wood was expected to face Paige VanZant on 10 December 2015 at UFC Fight Night 80. However, Wood was pulled from the fight on 28 October and replaced by Rose Namajunas.

==== Move up to flyweight division ====
Wood next faced Valérie Létourneau at UFC Fight Night: MacDonald vs. Thompson in the first women's flyweight bout in UFC history. She won the fight via TKO in the third round after striking Létourneau with a kick to the body and finishing her off with punches.

==== Return to strawweight ====
Wood faced Jéssica Andrade in a strawweight bout on 10 September 2016 at UFC 203. She lost the fight via submission in the first round.

Wood faced Cynthia Calvillo in a strawweight bout on 16 July 2017 at UFC Fight Night 113. At the weigh-ins, Wood came in at 118 lbs, two pounds over the strawweight limit of 116 lbs. As a result, she will be fined 20% of her purse, which will go to Calvillo and their bout proceeded as scheduled at a catchweight. Wood lost the fight via unanimous decision.

==== Return to flyweight ====
Wood was, yet again, scheduled to face Bec Rawlings, in a flyweight bout at UFC Fight Night: Werdum vs. Tybura on 19 November 2017. However, on 7 November, it was announced that Wood withdrew from the event due to injury. She was replaced by promotional newcomer Jessica Rose-Clark.

Wood faced Kalindra Faria on 25 August 2018 at UFC Fight Night 135. She went on to win the fight via submission in the first round.

Wood faced promotional newcomer Ariane Lipski on 19 January 2019 at UFC Fight Night 143. She won the fight by unanimous decision.

Wood faced Katlyn Chookagian on 8 June 2019 at UFC 238. She lost the fight by a unanimous decision.

Wood faced Andrea Lee on 9 September 2019 at UFC 242. She won the fight via split decision.

Wood was scheduled to face Valentina Shevchenko on 6 June 2020 for the UFC Women's Flyweight Championship at UFC 251. However, Shevchenko pulled out of the fight on 31 March citing a leg injury and the bout was postponed.

Wood stepped in on short notice for Viviane Araújo to face Jennifer Maia on 1 August 2020 at UFC Fight Night: Brunson vs. Shahbazyan. She lost the fight via armbar submission in round one.

After the fight, Wood passed out backstage when getting checked out in the medical room. She was transported to a local hospital. Her heart rate dropped on the way there, but later stabilized.

Wood faced Jessica Eye on 24 January 2021 at UFC 257. She won the fight via unanimous decision.

Wood faced Lauren Murphy on 12 June 2021 at UFC 263. She lost the fight via split decision.

As the first bout of her new, multi-fight contract, Wood was scheduled to face Alexa Grasso on 20 November 2021 at UFC Fight Night 198. However, Grasso was forced to pull out from the event due to injury and she was replaced by Taila Santos. She lost the bout via rear-naked choke at the end of the first round.

Wood faced Alexa Grasso in a rescheduled bout on 26 March 2022 at UFC on ESPN 33. She lost the fight via a rear-naked choke in the first round.

Wood faced Luana Carolina on 18 March 2023 at UFC 286. She won the bout via split decision.

Wood was scheduled to face Priscila Cachoeira at UFC 291 on 29 July 2023. Wood pulled out of the fight due to undisclosed reasons and was replaced by Miranda Maverick.

Wood faced Maryna Moroz on 9 March 2024, at UFC 299. She won the bout by split decision and announced her retirement during the post-fight interview.

== Personal life ==
Wood was previously engaged to her former coach James Doolan until 2015. She became engaged to Syndicate MMA head coach John Wood in October 2019, and the couple was married in October 2021. She recently gave birth to Fraser Wood.

She took up residence in Las Vegas in March 2018, having previously lived and trained in Montreal.

== Championships and accomplishments ==
=== Kickboxing ===
- International Kickboxing Federation
  - IKF European Flyweight (53.2 kg / 117 lb) Championship
- International Sport Karate Association
  - ISKA World Flyweight (-51.8 kg / 114 lb) Championship
- Scottish Thai Boxing Association
  - 2009 STBA Fighter of the Year
- World Boxing Council Muaythai
  - WBC Muaythai British Flyweight (-50.8 kg / 112 lb) Championship
- World Kickboxing League
  - WKL European Flyweight Championship

=== Mixed martial arts ===
- Ultimate Fighting Championship
  - Fight of the Night (One time) vs. Cortney Casey
  - Most significant strikes landed in UFC Women's Flyweight division history (1043)
  - Tied (Jennifer Maia) for fourth most wins in UFC Women's Flyweight division history (12)
    - Second most total strikes landed in UFC Women's Flyweight division history (1427)
  - Third most significant strikes landed-per-minute in UFC Women's Flyweight division history (7.67)
  - Fourth highest striking differential in UFC Women's Flyweight division history (2.42)
  - Fourth highest takedown accuracy percentage in UFC Women's Flyweight division history (53.9%)
- Women's MMA Press Awards
  - 2014 Fan Favorite Fighter of the Year
  - 2012 Newcomer of the Year
- Fight Matrix
  - 2012 Female Rookie of the Year

== Mixed martial arts record ==
Professional record breakdown
25 matches	17 wins	8 losses
By knockout	5	0
By submission	1	5
By decision	11	3

Res.	Record	Opponent	Method	Event	Date	Round	Time	Location	Notes
Win	17–8	Maryna Moroz	Decision (split)	UFC 299	9 March 2024	3	5:00	Miami, Florida, United States	
Win	16–8	Luana Carolina	Decision (split)	UFC 286	18 March 2023	3	5:00	London, England	
Loss	15–8	Alexa Grasso	Submission (rear-naked choke)	UFC on ESPN: Blaydes vs. Daukaus	26 March 2022	1	3:57	Columbus, Ohio, United States	
Loss	15–7	Taila Santos	Submission (rear-naked choke)	UFC Fight Night: Vieira vs. Tate	20 November 2021	1	4:49	Las Vegas, Nevada, United States	
Loss	15–6	Lauren Murphy	Decision (split)	UFC 263	12 June 2021	3	5:00	Glendale, Arizona, United States	
Win	15–5	Jessica Eye	Decision (unanimous)	UFC 257	24 January 2021	3	5:00	Abu Dhabi, United Arab Emirates	
Loss	14–5	Jennifer Maia	Submission (armbar)	UFC Fight Night: Brunson vs. Shahbazyan	1 August 2020	1	4:29	Las Vegas, Nevada, United States	
Win	14–4	Andrea Lee	Decision (split)	UFC 242	7 September 2019	3	5:00	Abu Dhabi, United Arab Emirates	
Loss	13–4	Katlyn Chookagian	Decision (unanimous)	UFC 238	8 June 2019	3	5:00	Chicago, Illinois, United States	
Win	13–3	Ariane Lipski	Decision (unanimous)	UFC Fight Night: Cejudo vs. Dillashaw	19 January 2019	3	5:00	Brooklyn, New York, United States	
Win	12–3	Kalindra Faria	Submission (triangle armbar)	UFC Fight Night: Gaethje vs. Vick	25 August 2018	1	4:57	Lincoln, Nebraska, United States	Return to Flyweight.
Loss	11–3	Cynthia Calvillo	Decision (unanimous)	UFC Fight Night: Nelson vs. Ponzinibbio	16 July 2017	3	5:00	Glasgow, Scotland	Catchweight (118 lb) bout; Wood missed weight.
Loss	11–2	Jéssica Andrade	Submission (guillotine choke)	UFC 203	10 September 2016	1	4:38	Cleveland, Ohio, United States	
Win	11–1	Valérie Létourneau	TKO (body kick and punches)	UFC Fight Night: MacDonald vs. Thompson	18 June 2016	3	2:51	Ottawa, Ontario, Canada	Flyweight bout.
Win	10–1	Cortney Casey	Decision (unanimous)	UFC Fight Night: Bisping vs. Leites	18 July 2015	3	5:00	Glasgow, Scotland	Fight of the Night.
Loss	9–1	Maryna Moroz	Submission (armbar)	UFC Fight Night: Gonzaga vs. Cro Cop 2	11 April 2015	1	1:30	Kraków, Poland	
Win	9–0	Ham Seo-hee	Decision (unanimous)	The Ultimate Fighter: A Champion Will Be Crowned Finale	12 December 2014	3	5:00	Las Vegas, Nevada, United States	
Win	8–0	Katja Kankaanpää	Decision (unanimous)	Invicta FC 7: Honchak vs. Smith	7 December 2013	3	5:00	Kansas City, Missouri, United States	
Win	7–0	Norma Rueda Center	Decision (unanimous)	Invicta FC 6: Coenen vs. Cyborg	13 July 2013	3	5:00	Kansas City, Missouri, United States	
Win	6–0	Sally Krumdiack	TKO (punches)	Cage Warriors Fighting Championship 53	13 April 2013	1	3:08	Glasgow, Scotland	
Win	5–0	Livia von Plettenberg	Decision (unanimous)	Invicta FC 4: Esparza vs. Hyatt	5 January 2013	3	5:00	Kansas City, Kansas, United States	
Win	4–0	Ashley Cummins	TKO (knee to the body)	Invicta FC 3: Penne vs. Sugiyama	6 October 2012	1	3:13	Kansas City, Kansas, United States	Return to Strawweight. Knockout of the Night.
Win	3–0	Ainara Mota	TKO (punches)	On Top 5	2 June 2012	2	2:46	Glasgow, Scotland	Catchweight (121 lb) bout.
Win	2–0	Lena Ovchynnikova	Decision (unanimous)	SFL 3	6 May 2012	3	5:00	New Delhi, India	Flyweight debut.
Win	1–0	Noellie Molina	TKO (punches)	On Top 4	25 February 2012	1	3:13	Glasgow, Scotland	Strawweight debut.

=== Mixed martial arts exhibition record ===
Exhibition record breakdown		
2 matches	1 win	1 loss
By submission	0	1
By decision	1	0

Res.	Record	Opponent	Method	Event	Date	Round	Time	Location	Notes
Loss	1–1	Rose Namajunas	Submission (kimura)	The Ultimate Fighter: A Champion Will Be Crowned	3 December 2014 (airdate)	2	2:05	Las Vegas, Nevada, United States	TUF 20 Quarterfinal round.
Win	1–0	Emily Kagan	Decision (majority)	The Ultimate Fighter: A Champion Will Be Crowned	17 September 2014 (airdate)	2	5:00	Las Vegas, Nevada, United States	TUF 20 Elimination round.

== Kickboxing record ==
Kickboxing record
19 wins (6+ KOs), 2 losses, 0 draws
Date	Result	Opponent	Event	Location	Method	Round	Time	Record
2012-09-02	Win	(Sweden) Jenny Krigsman	Oran Mor VII	Glasgow, Scotland	TKO (stoppage)	4		19–2
Wins the ISKA World Flyweight (-51.8 kg / 114 lb) Championship.
2011-09-11	Win	(England) Sally McCarthy	Muay Thai Supershow	Poole, England	Decision (unanimous)	5	3:00	18–2
Wins the WBC Muaythai British Flyweight (-50.8 kg / 112 lb) Championship.
2011-06-18	Win	(France) Laetitia Lambert	Hostile Intentions 4	Hamilton, Scotland	TKO	4		17–2
2011-00-00	Loss	(England) Alexis Rufus	Shin Kick Promotions	Woking, England	Decision	5		16–2
For the WKA World Championship.
2010-11-13	Win	(Venezuela) Karla Benitez		Barcelona, Spain	Decision			16–1
Wins the WKL European Flyweight Championship.
2010-08-11	Loss	(England) Melissa Ray	Queen's Birthday Celebrations	Bangkok, Thailand	Decision (split)			
For the WPMF World Featherweight (-57.1 kg / 126 lb) Championship.
2010-05-01	Win	(South Africa) Ferial Ameeroedien	Power of Scotland 8	Glasgow, Scotland				
2009-09-13	Win	(Spain) Maria Curriki	Oran Mor III	Glasgow, Scotland	Decision	5	2:00	
Wins the IKF European Flyweight (53.2 kg / 117 lb) Championship.
2009-05-09	Win	(New Zealand) Michelle Preston	Ladykillers III	Manchester, England	Decision (unanimous)	5	2:00	
2008-09-14	Win	(England) Christi Brereton	Oran Mor	Glasgow, Scotland	Decision	5	2:00	
2008-07-13	Win	(England) Pam McCarthy	Master A's Show	Manchester, England	TKO	3		
2008-05-18	Win	(Czech Republic) Simona Soukupova	Woking Fight Night	Woking, England	Decision			
2007-09-23	Win	(England) Zoe Green	September Showdown	Motherwell, Scotland	Decision	5		
2006-05-28	Win	(Scotland) Kirsty Mack	Chaos in Kirkintilloch	Kirkintilloch, Scotland				
2005-07-16	Win	(Scotland) Trish Carson	STBA	Barrhead, Scotland	Decision			
0000-00-00	Win	(Thailand)	Bang Klang Stadium	Bangkok, Thailand	TKO	4		
0000-00-00	Win	(England) Sophie Bowyer			TKO	1		
0000-00-00	Win	(Scotland) Pat Strachan		Scotland	TKO	3		
Legend: Win Loss Draw/No contest Notes

== See also ==
- List of female mixed martial artists
