= Luana Carolina =

Brazilian mixed martial arts fighter

- Born: Luana Carolina Carvalho de Souza; June 11, 1993 (age 33); São Paulo, Brazil
- Other names: Dread
- Height: 5 ft 6 in (1.68 m)
- Weight: 144 lb (65 kg; 10 st 4 lb)
- Division: Flyweight
- Reach: 69 in (175 cm)
- Fighting out of: São Paulo, Brazil
- Team: Capital da Luta
- Rank: Blue belt in Muay Thai; Blue belt in Brazilian Jiu-Jitsu
- Years active: 2015–present

Mixed martial arts record
- Total: 16
- Wins: 11
- By knockout: 3
- By submission: 1
- By decision: 7
- Losses: 5
- By knockout: 1
- By submission: 1
- By decision: 3

Other information
- Mixed martial arts record from Sherdog

Luana Carolina Carvalho de Souza (born June 11, 1993) is a Brazilian mixed martial artist who competed in the women's Flyweight division of the Ultimate Fighting Championship.

== Mixed martial arts career ==
=== Early career ===
Starting her career in 2015, Carolina went 4–1 on the regional Brazilian scene before she was invited to Dana White's Contender Series Brazil 3 on August 11, 2018. She faced Mabelly Lima and won the bout via unanimous decision, getting an UFC contract in the process.

=== Ultimate Fighting Championship ===
Carolina made her UFC debut, as a short notice replacement for Wu Yanan, on two days notice against Priscila Cachoeira at UFC 237 on May 11, 2019. Carolina went on to defeat Cachoeira by unanimous decision.

Carolina was scheduled to face Ariane Lipski on May 16, 2020, at UFC Fight Night 175 However, on April 9, Dana White, the president of the UFC, announced that this event was postponed to UFC on ESPN 10 on June 13, 2020. Instead the pair eventually fought on July 19, 2020, at UFC Fight Night 172. Carolina lost the fight by submission by kneebar in the first round.

Carolina, as a replacement for Mayra Bueno Silva, faced Poliana Botelho on May 1, 2021, at UFC on ESPN 23. At the weigh-ins, Carolina weighed in 128.5 pounds, 2.5 pounds over the women's flyweight non-title limit. The bout proceeded at catchweight and she will was fined 20% of her purse which will go to Botelho. She won the bout via split decision.

Carolina was scheduled to face Maryna Moroz on October 16, 2021, at UFC Fight Night 195. However, at the end of September, Moroz pulled out of the bout and was replaced by Sijara Eubanks. In turn Eubanks was pulled from the event due to Covid-19 protocol and she was replaced by Lupita Godinez. Carolina won the fight via unanimous decision.

Carolina faced Molly McCann on March 19, 2022, at UFC Fight Night 204. She lost the fight via knockout in round three.

Carolina faced Joanne Wood on March 18, 2023, at UFC 286. She lost the bout via split decision.

Carolina faced Ivana Petrović on July 1, 2023, at UFC on ESPN 48. She won the fight via unanimous decision.

Carolina faced Julija Stoliarenko on February 3, 2024, at UFC Fight Night 235. At the weigh-ins, Carolina weighed in at 128 pounds, two pounds over the women's flyweight non-title fight limit. Her bout proceeded at catchweight with Carolina forfeiting an undisclosed percentage of her purse, which went to Stoliarenko. She won the fight via technical knockout in the third round.

Carolina faced Lucie Pudilová on July 20, 2024, at UFC on ESPN 60. She won the fight by unanimous decision.

Carolina was scheduled to face Montana De La Rosa on March 1, 2025 at UFC Fight Night 253. However, the bout was scrapped as a result of Carolina's botched weight cut.

Moving up to bantamweight, Carolina faced Michelle Montague on September 28, 2025, at UFC Fight Night 260. Despite being deducted one point due to an illegal upkick, Carolina lost the fight via unanimous decision.

Carolina was scheduled to face Melissa Mullins on March 21, 2026 at UFC Fight Night 270. However, Carolina weighed in at 144 pounds, eight pounds over the women's bantamweight non-title fight limit, which led to the cancellation of the bout.

On April 1, 2026, it was reported that Carolina was removed from the UFC roster.

== Mixed martial arts record ==
Professional record breakdown
| 16 matches | 11 wins | 5 losses |
| By knockout | 3 | 1 |
| By submission | 1 | 1 |
| By decision | 7 | 3 |

| Res. | Record | Opponent | Method | Event | Date | Round | Time | Location | Notes |
|---|---|---|---|---|---|---|---|---|---|
| Loss | 11–5 | Michelle Montague | Decision (unanimous) | UFC Fight Night: Ulberg vs. Reyes | September 28, 2025 | 3 | 5:00 | Perth, Australia | Return to Bantamweight. Carolina was deducted one point in round 2 due to an illegal upkick. |
| Win | 11–4 | Lucie Pudilová | Decision (unanimous) | UFC on ESPN: Lemos vs. Jandiroba | July 20, 2024 | 3 | 5:00 | Las Vegas, Nevada, United States | |
| Win | 10–4 | Julija Stoliarenko | TKO (punches) | UFC Fight Night: Dolidze vs. Imavov | February 3, 2024 | 3 | 4:52 | Las Vegas, Nevada, United States | Catchweight (129 lb) bout; Carolina missed weight. |
| Win | 9–4 | Ivana Petrović | Decision (unanimous) | UFC on ESPN: Strickland vs. Magomedov | July 1, 2023 | 3 | 5:00 | Las Vegas, Nevada, United States | |
| Loss | 8–4 | Joanne Wood | Decision (split) | UFC 286 | March 18, 2023 | 3 | 5:00 | London, England | |
| Loss | 8–3 | Molly McCann | KO (spinning back elbow) | UFC Fight Night: Volkov vs. Aspinall | March 19, 2022 | 3 | 1:52 | London, England | |
| Win | 8–2 | Lupita Godinez | Decision (unanimous) | UFC Fight Night: Ladd vs. Dumont | October 16, 2021 | 3 | 5:00 | Las Vegas, Nevada, United States | |
| Win | 7–2 | Poliana Botelho | Decision (split) | UFC on ESPN: Reyes vs. Procházka | May 1, 2021 | 3 | 5:00 | Las Vegas, Nevada, United States | Catchweight (128.5 lb) bout; Carolina missed weight. |
| Loss | 6–2 | Ariane Lipski | Submission (kneebar) | UFC Fight Night: Figueiredo vs. Benavidez 2 | July 19, 2020 | 1 | 1:28 | Abu Dhabi, United Arab Emirates | |
| Win | 6–1 | Priscila Cachoeira | Decision (unanimous) | UFC 237 | May 11, 2019 | 3 | 5:00 | Rio de Janeiro, Brazil | Flyweight debut. |
| Win | 5–1 | Mabelly Lima | Decision (unanimous) | Dana White's Contender Series Brazil 3 | August 11, 2018 | 3 | 5:00 | Las Vegas, Nevada, United States | |
| Win | 4–1 | Mary Ellen Sato | Decision (unanimous) | Thunder Fight 12 | September 29, 2017 | 3 | 5:00 | São Paulo, Brazil | |
| Win | 3–1 | Jessica Negrão | TKO (punches) | Batalha MMA 3 | July 9, 2016 | 1 | 1:02 | São Paulo, Brazil | Bantamweight debut. |
| Win | 2–1 | Ana Merlin | TKO (punches) | Thunder Fight 5 | September 19, 2015 | 1 | 1:10 | São Paulo, Brazil | |
| Win | 1–1 | Isabela de Pádua | Submission (guillotine choke) | Casa Branca Fight 2 | May 30, 2015 | 2 | N/A | Casa Branca, Brazil | |
| :Loss | 0–1 | Daiane Firmino | Decision (split) | Arena Combat: Fight Night | January 24, 2015 | 3 | 5:00 | São Sebastião, Brazil | Strawweight debut. |

== See also ==
- List of female mixed martial artists
