= UFC Fight Night: Brunson vs. Till =

UFC mixed martial arts event in 2021

- The poster for UFC Fight Night: Brunson vs. Till
- Promotion: Ultimate Fighting Championship
- Date: September 4, 2021
- Venue: UFC Apex
- City: Enterprise, Nevada
- Attendance: Not announced

Event chronology
UFC on ESPN: Barboza vs. Chikadze	UFC Fight Night: Brunson vs. Till	UFC Fight Night: Smith vs. Spann

UFC Fight Night: Brunson vs. Till (also known as UFC Fight Night 191 and UFC on ESPN+ 49 and UFC Vegas 36) was a mixed martial arts event produced by the Ultimate Fighting Championship that took place on September 4, 2021, at the UFC Apex facility in Enterprise, Nevada, part of the Las Vegas Metropolitan Area, United States.

== Background ==
While never officially announced by the organization, the promotion initially wanted to contest the event in London. It would have marked the promotion's first event in the United Kingdom since UFC Fight Night: Till vs. Masvidal in March 2019, as well as the first country other than the United Arab Emirates to host an international event after the pandemic effects began on mixed martial arts. However, negotiations with the British officials fizzled amongst COVID-19 protocols and the promotion turned to their home base of Las Vegas.

A middleweight bout between Derek Brunson and former UFC Welterweight Championship challenger Darren Till headlined the event. They were originally expected to serve as the main event for a planned event on August 14, but the date was scrapped.

Several bouts were also booked to take place at the planned August 14 event, before being rescheduled to this date:

- A women's flyweight bout between Taila Santos and Mandy Böhm. In turn, after the change in location, Santos was removed due to alleged visa issues and replaced by former KSW Women's Flyweight Champion Ariane Lipski. Subsequently, the bout was removed from the card during the week leading up to the event as Böhm was sidelined due to illness. The pairing is expected to remain intact and be rescheduled two weeks later at UFC Fight Night: Smith vs. Spann.
- A women's flyweight bout between Molly McCann and Ji Yeon Kim.
- A featherweight bout featuring Charles Jourdain and Lerone Murphy. Murphy was eventually pulled from the event due to visa issues and replaced by Julian Erosa, changing the contest to a catchweight bout of 150 pounds.
- A middleweight bout between Marc-André Barriault and Dalcha Lungiambula.

A flyweight bout between former UFC Flyweight Championship challenger Alex Perez and Matt Schnell had been rescheduled for this event. They were originally expected to meet at UFC 262, before Perez was forced to pull out due to undisclosed reasons. They were then booked again at UFC on ESPN: Barboza vs. Chikadze, before being shifted to this event. However, the bout was yet again postponed for unknown reasons to UFC 269.

Nathaniel Wood was expected to face Jonathan Martinez in a bantamweight bout at the event. However, Wood pulled out of the bout in mid-August citing a broken hand and was replaced by Marcelo Rojo. At the weigh-ins, Martinez weighed in at 138 pounds, two pounds over the bantamweight non-title fight limit. The bout was expected to proceed at a catchweight, but it was eventually scrapped hours later.

A bantamweight bout between Jack Shore and Said Nurmagomedov was scheduled for the event. However, Nurmagomedov was pulled from the event due to visa issues and was replaced by Zviad Lazishvili. Lazishvili later pulled out due to injury and was replaced by Liudvik Sholinian.

A light heavyweight bout between former UFC Light Heavyweight Championship challenger Alexander Gustafsson and Paul Craig was expected to take place at the event. However, a week before the event, Gustafsson withdrew due to injury. In turn, promotion officials removed Craig from the card as well.

A light heavyweight bout between former light heavyweight title challenger Volkan Oezdemir and Magomed Ankalaev was expected to take place at this event. However, the bout was postponed to UFC 267 for unknown reasons.

A welterweight bout between David Zawada and Sergey Khandozhko was expected to take place at the event. However, the week before the event, Khandozhko was pulled from the contest for unknown reasons and replaced by Alex Morono.

A heavyweight bout between Sergei Pavlovich and Tom Aspinall was expected to serve as the co-headliner. However, Pavlovich pulled out a week before the contest due to visa issues and was replaced by Serghei Spivac.

A lightweight bout between Marc Diakiese and Rafael Alves was scheduled for the event. However, Alves pulled out of the fight in mid-August for undisclosed reasons and in turn, Diakiese was removed from the card as well.

== Results ==
Main card (ESPN+)
Weight class				Method	Round	Time	Notes
Middleweight	Derek Brunson	def.	Darren Till	Submission (rear-naked choke)	3	2:13
Heavyweight	Tom Aspinall	def.	Serghei Spivac	TKO (elbow and punches)	1	2:30
Welterweight	Alex Morono	def.	David Zawada	Decision (unanimous) (30–27, 30–27, 30–27)	3	5:00
Light Heavyweight	Khalil Rountree Jr.	def.	Modestas Bukauskas	TKO (leg kick)	2	2:30
Lightweight	Paddy Pimblett	def.	Luigi Vendramini	KO (punches)	1	4:25
Preliminary card (ESPN+)
Women’s Flyweight	Molly McCann	def.	Ji Yeon Kim	Decision (unanimous) (29–28, 29–28, 29–28)	3	5:00
Bantamweight	Jack Shore	def.	Liudvik Sholinian	Decision (unanimous) (30–27, 30–27, 30–27)	3	5:00
Catchweight (150 lb)	Julian Erosa	def.	Charles Jourdain	Submission (D'Arce choke)	3	2:56
Middleweight	Marc-André Barriault	def.	Dalcha Lungiambula	Decision (unanimous) (29–28, 29–28, 30–27)	3	5:00

== Bonus awards ==
The following fighters received $50,000 bonuses.

- Fight of the Night: Molly McCann vs. Ji Yeon Kim
- Performance of the Night: Tom Aspinall and Paddy Pimblett

== See also ==
- List of UFC events
- List of current UFC fighters
- 2021 in UFC
