= São José da Tapera =

Municipality in Alagoas, Brazil

- Municipality of Alagoas, Brazil
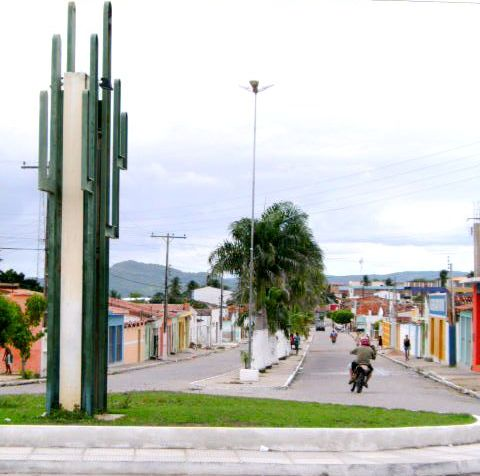
- Intersection of José de Oliveira Fontes and Manoel Maciano roads

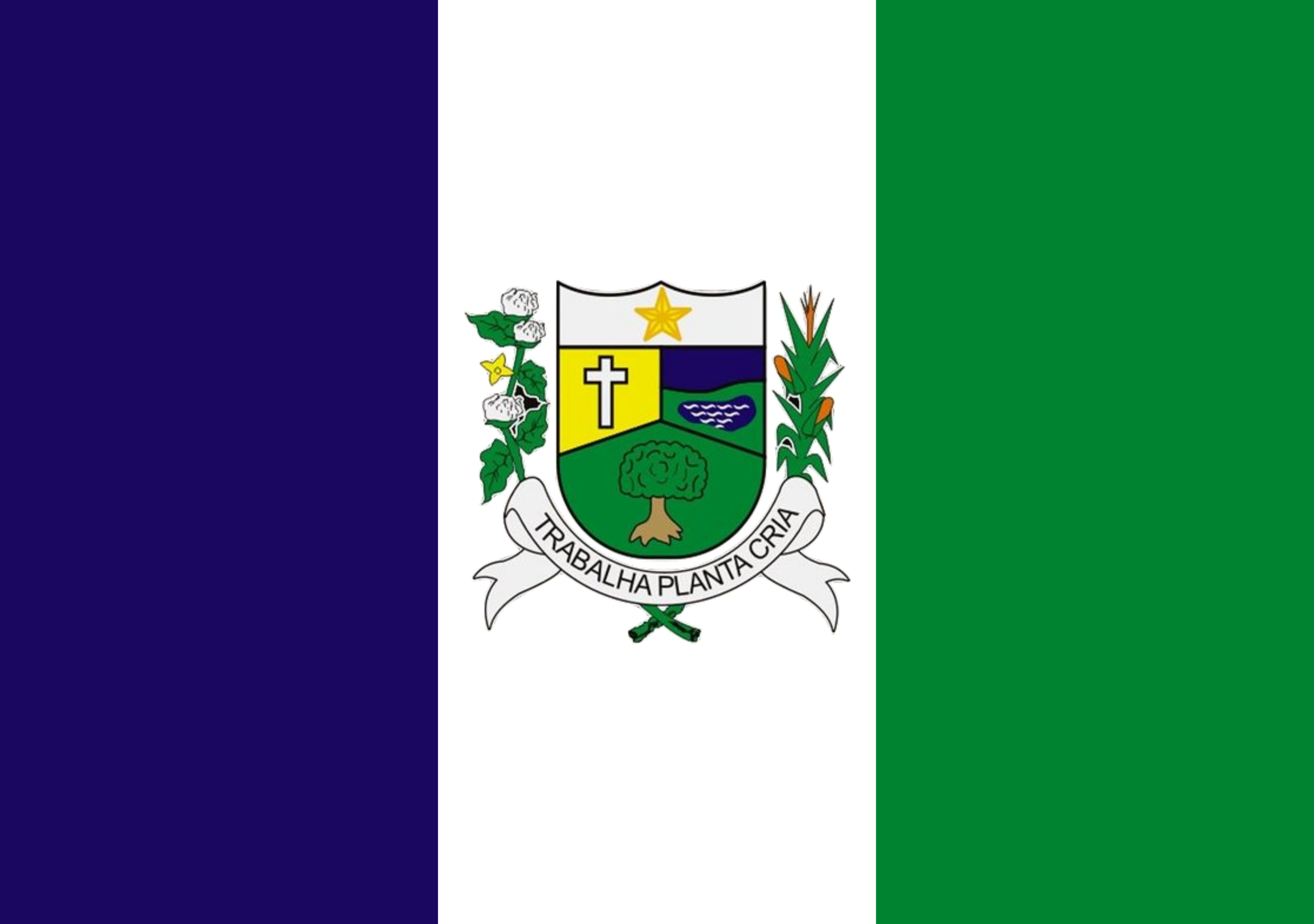
- Flag

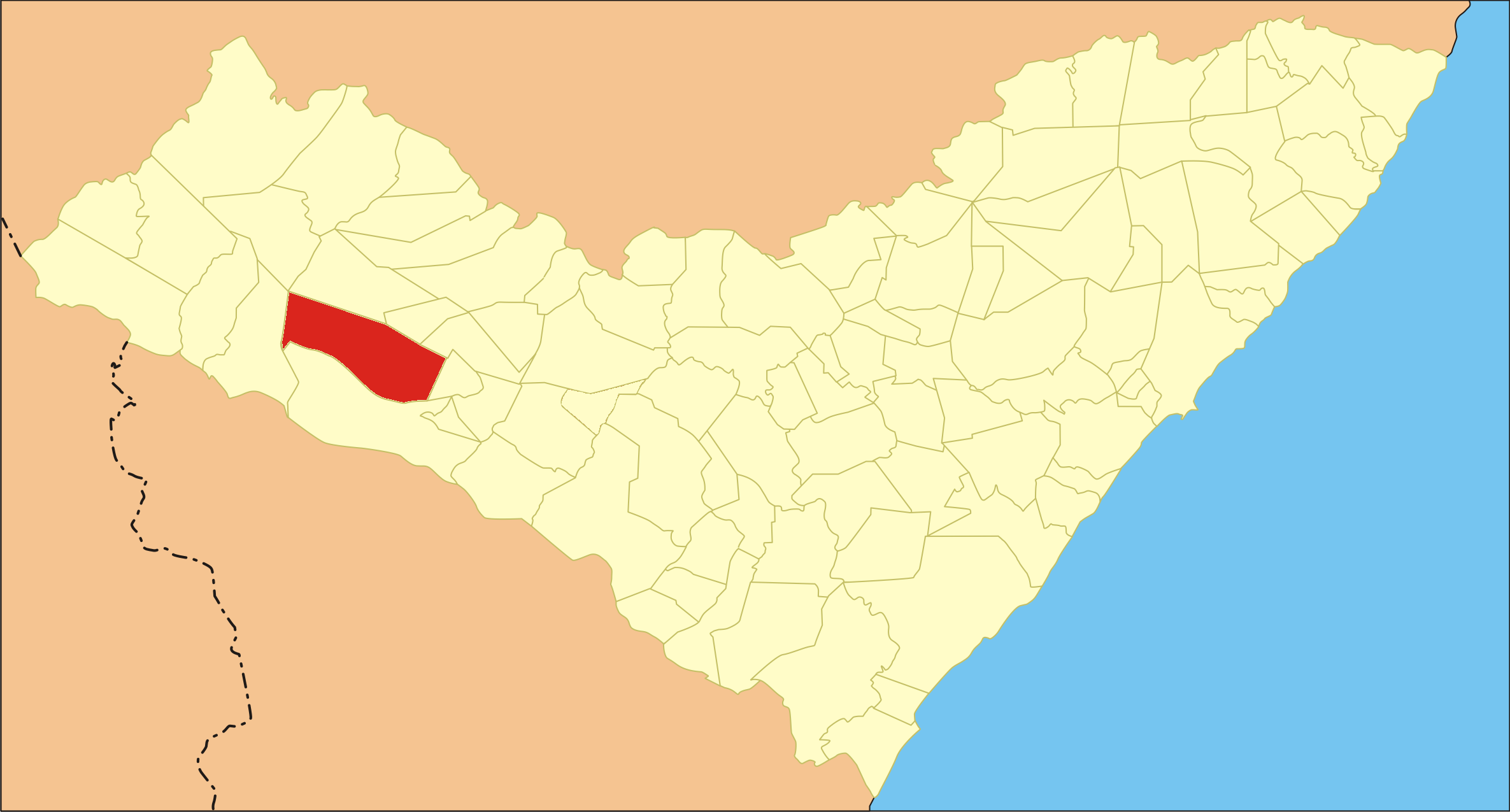
- Location of São José da Tapera in Alagoas

- Location within Brazil Location within South America
- Coordinates: 9°33′28″S 37°22′51″W
- Country: Brazil
- Region: Northeast
- State: Alagoas
- Founded: 24 December 1957

Government
  - Mayor: Jarbas Pereira Ricardo (MDB) (2025-2028)
  - Vice Mayor: Jaria Pereira Ricardo (PP) (2025-2028)

Area
  - Total: 490.880 km^{2} (189.530 sq mi)
- Elevation: 200 m (660 ft)

Population (2022)
  - Total: 30,604
  - Density: 62.35/km^{2} (161.5/sq mi)
- Demonym: Taperense (Brazilian Portuguese)
- Time zone: UTC-03:00 (Brasília Time)
- Postal code: 57445-000
- HDI (2010): 0.527 – low
- Website: saojosedatapera.al.gov.br

São José da Tapera (Central northeastern portuguese pronunciation: [ˈsɐ̃w ʒuˈɐ̃w ˈda taˈpɛɾɐ]) is a municipality located in the western of the Brazilian state of Alagoas. Its population was 32,405 (2020) and its area is 520 km^{2} (200 sq mi).

== See also ==
- List of municipalities in Alagoas
