= Marvin Vettori =

Italian mixed martial artist

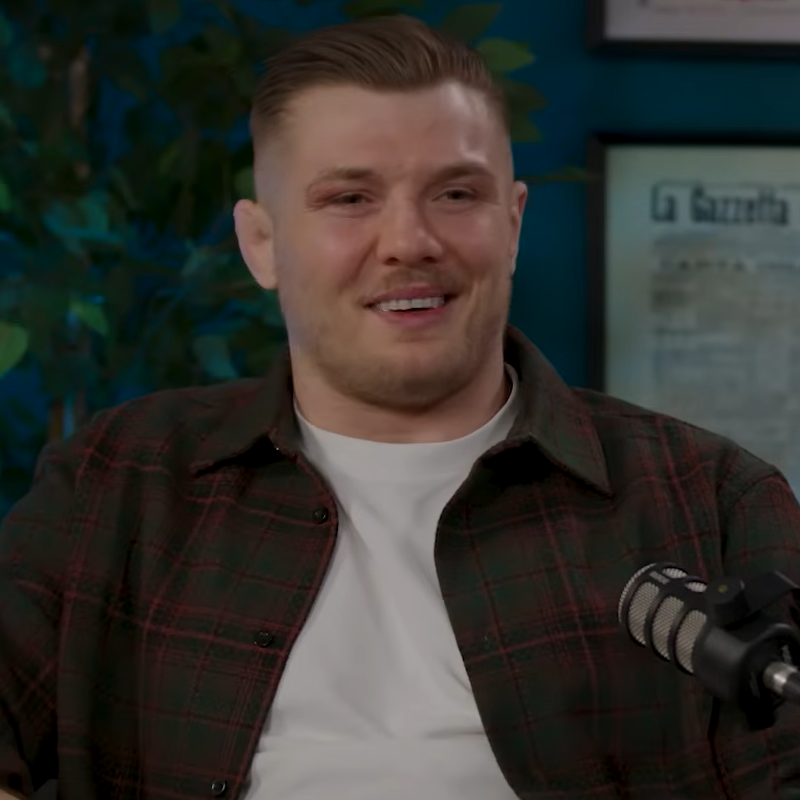
- Born: September 20, 1993 (age 33); Trento, Italy
- Other names: The Italian Dream
- Height: 6 ft 0 in (1.83 m)
- Weight: 185 lb (84 kg; 13 st 3 lb)
- Division: Light heavyweight (2021); Middleweight (2016–present); Welterweight (2012–2015)
- Reach: 74 in (188 cm)
- Fighting out of: Mezzocorona, Trentino, Italy
- Team: London Shootfighters (2012–2014); Stabile Fight Team (2014–present); Kings MMA (2015–2022); Xtreme Couture (2023); American Top Team (2023–present)
- Teachers: Jason Manly (BJJ); Dewey Cooper (Striking); Emanuele Lochner (S&C)
- Rank: Brown belt in Brazilian Jiu-Jitsu under Filippo Stabile
- Years active: 2012–present

Mixed martial arts record
- Total: 31
- Wins: 19
- By knockout: 2
- By submission: 9
- By decision: 8
- Losses: 11
- By decision: 11
- Draws: 1

Other information
- Website: Marvin Vettori Official website
- Mixed martial arts record from Sherdog

Marvin Vettori (Italian pronunciation: [vetˈtoːri]; born September 20, 1993) is an Italian professional mixed martial artist. He currently competes in the Middleweight division of the Ultimate Fighting Championship (UFC) and was a contender for the UFC Middleweight Championship. A professional since 2012, Vettori is a former Venator FC Welterweight Champion.

== Background ==
The eldest of three siblings, Vettori was born in Trento, Italy. He was interested in martial arts at a young age, and started practicing kickboxing as his first real martial art around the age of 13. He was inspired to train mixed martial arts after watching fighters such as Fedor Emelianenko in PRIDE on television when he was sixteen.

When he started out training MMA in Italy, Vettori went to six different gyms to get all the skills and training he needed, as in Italy, at that time, the sport was still growing and a proper MMA gym was hard to find. He moved to London in 2012 for two years to train MMA and later moved to the United States to train at Kings MMA.

Vettori trains six days per week and his typical training day would split into two sessions, one in the morning and one in the evening. He starts out his training at 10 am to train on his striking technique with his coach, Rafael Cordeiro, for an hour, followed by wrestling drills and cage work with the help of Mark Muñoz. The second session would be in the evening to work on either conditioning or BJJ training which usually would end at 10 p.m.

== Mixed martial arts career ==
=== Early career ===
Vettori fought in the European circuit and amassed a record of 10–2 prior joining the UFC.

=== Ultimate Fighting Championship ===
==== 2016 ====
Vettori made his UFC debut on August 20, 2016, at UFC 202 against Alberto Emilliano Pereira. He tapped out Pereira via guillotine choke in round one.

Vettori next faced Antônio Carlos Júnior at UFC 207 on December 30, 2016. Both Vettori and Carlos Júnior committed eyepokes and received a warning each from the referee but no point was deducted. The fight lasted three rounds and Vettori lost via unanimous decision, with 29–28 scores across the board.

==== 2017 ====
Vettori faced Vitor Miranda on June 25, 2017, at UFC Fight Night: Chiesa vs. Lee. He won the fight by unanimous decision.

Vettori faced Omari Akhmedov on December 30 at UFC 219. The back-and-forth fight ended in a majority draw. One of the judges scored it 29–28 for Vettori, and the others viewed it as a 28–28 draw, with Akhmedov winning the first two rounds, but Vettori having a dominant 10–8 round in the third. 10 out of 15 media outlets scored the bout for Akhmedov while 3 of the 15 scored the bout as a draw.

==== 2018 ====
Vettori's next fight was scheduled on April 14, 2018, against future champion Israel Adesanya at UFC on Fox 29. He lost the fight via a split decision, with two judges scoring the fight 29–28 for Adesanya, and the third judging it as 29–28 for Vettori. 15 out of 17 media outlets scored the bout for Adesanya.

==== 2019 ====
On April 23, 2019, it was reported that Vettori was suspended for 6 months as he tested positive for ostarine, a selective androgen receptor modulator, from an out-of-competition test conducted on August 24, 2018. The United States Anti-Doping Agency determined that the positive test was the result of a contaminated dietary supplement, and found no evidence of intentional use of the banned substance. He became eligible to fight again on February 24, 2019.

Vettori faced Cezar Ferreira on July 13, 2019, at UFC Fight Night 155. He won the fight via unanimous decision.

After the fight with Ferreira, Vettori signed a new contract with the UFC and was scheduled to face Andrew Sanchez on September 14, 2019, at UFC Fight Night 158, replacing injured David Branch. However, it was reported that Sanchez was forced to pull from the event due to an eye infection, resulting in the cancellation of the bout. In turn, the pairing was left intact and eventually took place a month later at UFC Fight Night 161. Vettori won the fight via unanimous decision.

==== 2020 ====
Vettori was scheduled to face Darren Stewart on March 21, 2020, at UFC Fight Night: Woodley vs. Edwards. However, due to COVID-19 pandemic, the event was cancelled. Vettori was scheduled to meet Karl Roberson on April 25, 2020. However, on April 9, Dana White announced that this event was postponed. Instead Vettori was scheduled to face Karl Roberson on May 13, 2020, at UFC Fight Night: Smith vs. Teixeira. At the weigh-ins, Roberson weighed in at 187.5 pounds, 1.5 pounds over the middleweight non-title weight limit of 186 pounds. However, Roberson was removed from the fight due to rhabdomyolysis. The pair met on June 13, 2020, at UFC on ESPN: Eye vs. Calvillo. At the weigh-ins on June 12, Roberson once again missed weight, this time coming in at 190.5 pounds, 4.5 pounds over the non-title middleweight limit. The bout proceeded as a catchweight and Roberson was fined 30% of his purse. Vettori won the bout via first round submission. This win earned him the Performance of the Night award.

Vettori was briefly linked to a rematch with Omari Akhmedov for UFC 256 on December 12, 2020, but it was later announced Vettori was expected to face Ronaldo Souza at the event. Vettori instead faced Jack Hermansson on 5 December 2020 at UFC on ESPN 19, after Hermannson's original opponent Kevin Holland tested positive for COVID-19. He won the fight via unanimous decision. This fight earned him the Fight of the Night award.

==== 2021 ====
Vettori was scheduled to face Darren Till on April 10, 2021, at UFC on ABC 2. However, on March 30, Till announced that he was pulling out of the fight due to a broken collarbone. Till was replaced by Kevin Holland. Vettori won the fight against Holland by unanimous decision, after dominating him on the ground for the majority of the fight.

A rematch between Vettori and Israel Adesanya for the UFC Middleweight Championship took place on June 12, 2021, headlining UFC 263. Vettori lost the fight via unanimous decision.

Vettori faced Paulo Costa in a light heavyweight bout, after Costa could not make middleweight the week of the fight, on October 23, 2021, at UFC Fight Night 196. Vettori won the fight via unanimous decision. This win earned him Performance of the Night award.

==== 2022 ====
Vettori was scheduled to face former middleweight champion Robert Whittaker on June 11, 2022, at UFC 275. However, Whittaker withdrew for unknown reasons. The pair was rescheduled to meet at UFC Fight Night 209 on September 3, 2022. Vettori lost the fight via unanimous decision.

==== 2023 ====
Vettori faced Roman Dolidze on March 18, 2023, at UFC 286. He won the fight via unanimous decision. 14 out of 28 media outlets scored the bout for both Dolidze and Vettori.

Vettori faced Jared Cannonier on June 17, 2023, at UFC on ESPN 47. Vettori lost the bout via unanimous decision. The bout won Vettori his second Fight of the Night bonus award.

==== 2024 ====
Vettori was scheduled to face Brendan Allen on April 6, 2024, at UFC Fight Night 240. However, on March 14, it was announced that Vettori had withdrawn due to an injury, and was replaced by Chris Curtis.

==== 2025 ====
Vettori rematched Roman Dolidze in the main event on March 15, 2025 at UFC Fight Night 254. He lost the fight by unanimous decision.

Vettori's bout with Brendan Allen was rescheduled and took place on July 19, 2025, at UFC 318. Vettori lost the fight by unanimous decision. This fight earned him another Fight of the Night award.

Vettori faced Brunno Ferreira on December 6, 2025, at UFC 323. At the weigh-ins, Ferreira weighed in at 189 pounds, 3 pounds over the middleweight non-title fight limit. His bout proceeded at catchweight and he was fined 20 percent of his purse which went to Vettori. Vettori lost the fight by unanimous decision.

==== 2026 ====
Vettori was scheduled to face Ismail Naurdiev on June 27, 2026 at UFC Fight Night 280. However, Vettori withdrew due to a rib injury. The bout was re-scheduled to October 3, 2026 at UFC 332. Vettori lost the fight by unanimous decision.

== Professional grappling career ==
Vettori competed in a no gi grappling match, replacing Belal Muhammad, against Tarek Suleiman in the co-main event of ADXC 1 on October 20, 2023. He won the match by unanimous decision.

== Controversies ==
On March 24, 2023, Vettori took part in a brawl against the Italian rapper Ion at a boxing event in Milan in which he was present as a guest spectator. On social media, particularly Twitter (X), he frequently posts controversial and vindictive messages, particularly on race and religion. In November 2026, after Joaquin Buckley confronted Sean Strickland about his usage of "nigga", Vettori repeated the slur and stated "you can’t tell me black people of today feel anything of what it was for black slaves back then, we read it on history books. [sic] Eventually you gonna have to get over it right?", and "the rage you put out because I use the word nigga is exactly why we should all use it [sic]." He referred to IDF soldiers as "inbred", is a follower of Andrew Tate, and has repeated claims regarding Ashkenazi Jews wanting to take over the world.

== Personal life ==
On April 14, 2025, Vettori announced the death of his younger brother Patrick, who died at the age of 30 in a house fire in Italy.

== Championships and accomplishments ==
=== Mixed martial arts ===
- Ultimate Fighting Championship
  - Fight of the Night (Three times) vs. Jack Hermansson, Jared Cannonier and Brendan Allen
  - Performance of the Night (Two times) vs. Karl Roberson and Paulo Costa
  - Third most total strikes landed in UFC Middleweight division history (1687)
    - Third most significant strikes landed in UFC Middleweight division history (1274)
  - Third longest average fight time in UFC Middleweight division history (16:42)
  - Fourth most total fight time in UFC Middleweight division history (4:43:47)
- Venator Fighting Championship
  - VFC Welterweight Championship (One time)
- MMAjunkie.com
  - 2023 June Fight of the Month vs. Jared Cannonier

== Mixed martial arts record ==
Professional record breakdown
31 matches	19 wins	11 losses
By knockout	2	0
By submission	9	0
By decision	8	11
Draws	1	

Res.	Record	Opponent	Method	Event	Date	Round	Time	Location	Notes
Loss	19–11–1	Ismail Naurdiev	Decision (unanimous)	UFC 332	October 3, 2026	3	5:00	Salt Lake City, Utah, United States	
Loss	19–10–1	Brunno Ferreira	Decision (unanimous)	UFC 323	December 6, 2025	3	5:00	Las Vegas, Nevada, United States	Catchweight (189 lb) bout; Ferreira missed weight.
Loss	19–9–1	Brendan Allen	Decision (unanimous)	UFC 318	July 19, 2025	3	5:00	New Orleans, Louisiana, United States	Fight of the Night.
Loss	19–8–1	Roman Dolidze	Decision (unanimous)	UFC Fight Night: Vettori vs. Dolidze 2	March 15, 2025	5	5:00	Las Vegas, Nevada, United States	
Loss	19–7–1	Jared Cannonier	Decision (unanimous)	UFC on ESPN: Vettori vs. Cannonier	June 17, 2023	5	5:00	Las Vegas, Nevada, United States	Fight of the Night.
Win	19–6–1	Roman Dolidze	Decision (unanimous)	UFC 286	March 18, 2023	3	5:00	London, England	
Loss	18–6–1	Robert Whittaker	Decision (unanimous)	UFC Fight Night: Gane vs. Tuivasa	September 3, 2022	3	5:00	Paris, France	Return to Middleweight.
Win	18–5–1	Paulo Costa	Decision (unanimous)	UFC Fight Night: Costa vs. Vettori	October 23, 2021	5	5:00	Las Vegas, Nevada, United States	Light Heavyweight debut. Costa was deducted one point in round 2 due to an eye poke. Performance of the Night.
Loss	17–5–1	Israel Adesanya	Decision (unanimous)	UFC 263	June 12, 2021	5	5:00	Glendale, Arizona, United States	For the UFC Middleweight Championship.
Win	17–4–1	Kevin Holland	Decision (unanimous)	UFC on ABC: Vettori vs. Holland	April 10, 2021	5	5:00	Las Vegas, Nevada, United States	
Win	16–4–1	Jack Hermansson	Decision (unanimous)	UFC on ESPN: Hermansson vs. Vettori	December 5, 2020	5	5:00	Las Vegas, Nevada, United States	Fight of the Night.
Win	15–4–1	Karl Roberson	Submission (rear-naked choke)	UFC on ESPN: Eye vs. Calvillo	June 13, 2020	1	4:17	Las Vegas, Nevada, United States	Catchweight (190.5 lb) bout; Roberson missed weight. Performance of the Night.
Win	14–4–1	Andrew Sanchez	Decision (unanimous)	UFC Fight Night: Joanna vs. Waterson	October 12, 2019	3	5:00	Tampa, Florida, United States	
Win	13–4–1	Cezar Ferreira	Decision (unanimous)	UFC Fight Night: de Randamie vs. Ladd	July 13, 2019	3	5:00	Sacramento, California, United States	
Loss	12–4–1	Israel Adesanya	Decision (split)	UFC on Fox: Poirier vs. Gaethje	April 14, 2018	3	5:00	Glendale, Arizona, United States	
Draw	12–3–1	Omari Akhmedov	Draw (majority)	UFC 219	December 30, 2017	3	5:00	Las Vegas, Nevada, United States	
Win	12–3	Vitor Miranda	Decision (unanimous)	UFC Fight Night: Chiesa vs. Lee	June 25, 2017	3	5:00	Oklahoma City, Oklahoma, United States	
Loss	11–3	Antônio Carlos Júnior	Decision (unanimous)	UFC 207	December 30, 2016	3	5:00	Las Vegas, Nevada, United States	
Win	11–2	Alberto Uda	Submission (guillotine choke)	UFC 202	August 20, 2016	1	4:30	Las Vegas, Nevada, United States	
Win	10–2	Igor Araújo	Submission (guillotine choke)	Venator FC 3	May 21, 2016	1	4:30	Milan, Italy	Middleweight debut.
Win	9–2	Jack Mason	KO (knee and punches)	Venator FC 2	December 12, 2015	1	1:46	Rimini, Italy	Vettori missed weight (176.1 lb) and was stripped of the Venator FC Welterweight Championship. Only Mason was eligible to win the title.
Win	8–2	Daniele Scatizzi	Decision (unanimous)	Venator FC 1	May 30, 2015	3	5:00	Bologna, Italy	Won the Venator FC Welterweight Championship.
Win	7–2	Giorgio Pietrini	Submission (guillotine choke)	Venator FC: Guerrieri Italiani Semifinals	March 29, 2015	1	2:18	Bologna, Italy	
Win	6–2	Anderson da Silva Santos	TKO (punches and elbows)	Venator FC: Guerrieri Italiani Quarterfinals	January 25, 2015	1	1:07	Bologna, Italy	
Loss	5–2	Bill Beaumont	Decision (unanimous)	Ultimate Challenge MMA 40	September 6, 2014	3	5:00	London, England	For the vacant UCMMA Welterweight Championship.
Win	5–1	Giorgio Pietrini	Submission (toe hold)	Impera FC 3	June 13, 2014	1	3:14	Rome, Italy	
Win	4–1	Radovan Úškrt	Submission (triangle choke)	European MMA League 1	February 8, 2014	1	1:49	Zagreb, Croatia	
Win	3–1	Luca Ronchetti	Submission (rear-naked choke)	Impera FC 2	December 14, 2013	1	4:07	Rome, Italy	
Win	2–1	Matt Robinson	Submission (rear-naked choke)	Ultimate Challenge MMA 37	November 30, 2013	1	3:30	London, England	
Win	1–1	Tom Richards	Submission (rear-naked choke)	Ultimate Challenge MMA 35	August 3, 2013	1	1:31	London, England	
Loss	0–1	Alessandro Grandis	Decision (unanimous)	New Generation Tournament 6	July 21, 2012	2	5:00	Seveso, Italy	Welterweight debut.

== Pay-per-view bouts ==
No.	Event	Fight	Date	Venue	City	PPV Buys
1.	UFC 263	Adesanya vs. Vettori 2	June 12, 2021	Gila River Arena	Glendale, Arizona, United States	600,000

== See also ==
- List of current UFC fighters
- List of male mixed martial artists
