= Kings MMA =

Mixed martial arts training organization in California

- Est.: 2010; 16 years ago
- Founded by: Rafael Cordeiro
- Primary trainers: Rafael Cordeiro
- Past titleholders: Wanderlei Silva Pride Middleweight Champion (2001–2006); Mauricio Rua UFC Light Heavyweight Champion (2010); Lyoto Machida UFC Light Heavyweight Champion (2009); Fabrício Werdum UFC Heavyweight Champion (2015–2016) 236 lb (107 kg; 16.9 st); Rafael dos Anjos UFC Lightweight Champion (2015–2016); Sean Strickland UFC Middleweight Champion (2023)
- Training facilities: Huntington Beach, California, United States
- Website: kingsmma.com

Kings MMA is a mixed martial arts (MMA) gym located in Huntington Beach, California, headed by coach Rafael Cordeiro. A successful mixed martial artist in his native Brazil, Cordeiro moved to the United States in 2008, he was previously affiliated with and was an instructor in the pioneer MMA gym Chute Boxe. In 2010, he founded the Kings MMA gym.

Coach Cordeiro and Kings MMA were nominated for the 2014 World MMA Awards "Best coach of the year" and "Best gym of the year", respectively. Cordeiro won the “Best Coach of the Year” awards in 2012 and 2016. Kings MMA is one of the top professional MMA training camps.

== Notable fighters ==
=== Mixed martial arts ===
- Sean Strickland - Current UFC Middleweight Champion
- Yair Rodríguez - Former Interim UFC Featherweight Champion
- Maurício Rua - Former UFC Light Heavyweight Champion and 2005 PRIDE Middleweight Grand Prix Champion
- Wanderlei Silva - Former PRIDE Middleweight Champion and the 2003 PRIDE Middleweight Grand Prix Tournament Champion
- Fabrício Werdum - Former UFC Heavyweight Champion
- Rafael dos Anjos - Former UFC Lightweight Champion
- Cris Cyborg - Former UFC Women's Featherweight Champion
- Lyoto Machida - Former UFC Light Heavyweight Champion
- Beneil Dariush
- Marvin Vettori
- Kelvin Gastelum
- Bubba Jenkins
- Giga Chikadze
- Jon Tuck

== Awards ==
- Combat Press
  - 2015 Coach of the Year - Rafael Cordeiro
  - 2015 Gym of the Year

== See also ==
- List of professional MMA training camps
