= Jun Yong Park =

South Korean mixed martial arts fighter (born 1991)

Park Jun-yong
- Born: 27 February 1991 (age 35); Seoul, South Korea
- Other names: The Iron Turtle
- Height: 6 ft 0 in (1.83 m)
- Weight: 185 lb (84 kg; 13 st 3 lb)
- Division: Middleweight; Welterweight
- Reach: 73 in (185 cm)
- Fighting out of: Seoul, South Korea
- Team: Korean Top Team
- Years active: 2013–present

Mixed martial arts record
- Total: 26
- Wins: 19
- By knockout: 5
- By submission: 6
- By decision: 8
- Losses: 7
- By knockout: 1
- By submission: 2
- By decision: 4

Other information
- Mixed martial arts record from Sherdog

Park Jun-yong (born 27 February 1991), anglicized as Jun Yong Park, is a South Korean mixed martial artist who competes in the Middleweight division of the Ultimate Fighting Championship.

== Mixed martial arts career ==
=== Early career ===
Starting his career in 2013, Park compiled a 10–3 record, fighting mainly for a various regional Asian promotions, with his most memorable win being against future Professional Fighters League Welterweight champ, Ray Cooper III.

=== Ultimate Fighting Championship ===
Park made his UFC debut during UFC Fight Night 157, against Anthony Hernandez. He lost this fight by anaconda choke.

Park next faced Marc-André Barriault on December 21, 2019 at UFC Fight Night 165. He won the fight via unanimous decision.

Park was expected to face Trevin Giles on August 1, 2020 at UFC Fight Night 173. However, Park was removed from the bout on July 23 due to alleged travel restrictions related to the COVID-19 pandemic.

Park faced John Phillips on October 17, 2020 at UFC Fight Night 180. He won the fight via unanimous decision. Park landed 258 ground strikes during the fight, breaking the previous record of 251 ground strikes landed in a three-round fight set by Matt Riddle 11 years prior.

Park faced Tafon Nchukwi on May 8, 2021 at UFC on ESPN 24. He won the fight via majority decision.

Park faced Gregory Rodrigues on October 23, 2021 at UFC Fight Night 196. He lost the fight via knockout in round two. This fight earned him Fight of the Night award.

Park faced Eryk Anders on May 21, 2022 at UFC Fight Night 206. He won the bout via split decision. 9 out of 11 media outlets scored the bout for Anders.

Park faced Joseph Holmes on October 29, 2022 at UFC Fight Night 213. He won the fight via rear-naked choke in round two.

Park faced Denis Tiuliulin on February 4, 2023 at UFC Fight Night 218. He won the fight via rear-naked choke in round one.

Park next faced Albert Duraev at UFC on ESPN 49 on July 15, 2023, winning the fight via a rear-naked choke submission in the second round.

Park faced André Muniz on December 9, 2023, at UFC Fight Night 233. He lost the fight via split decision. 10 out of 14 media outlets scored the bout for Park.

Park was scheduled to face Brad Tavares on July 20, 2024, at UFC on ESPN 60. However, the bout was scrapped after the weigh-ins when Park was not medically cleared to compete. The bout was rescheduled to take place on October 12, 2024 at UFC Fight Night 244. Park won the fight via split decision.

Park was scheduled to face Ismail Naurdiev on May 17, 2025 at UFC Fight Night 256. However, for unknown reasons, the bout was rescheduled to UFC on ABC 8 and was held on June 21. After Naurdiev was deduced two points due to an illegal knee, Park won the fight by unanimous decision.

Park faced Ikram Aliskerov on October 25, 2025 at UFC 321. He lost the fight by unanimous decision.

Park was scheduled to face Edmen Shahbazyan on April 4, 2026 at UFC Fight Night 272. However, Park had to withdraw due to an injury.

Park is scheduled to face Marco Tulio on December 5, 2026, at UFC Fight Night 295.

== Championships and accomplishments ==
- Ultimate Fighting Championship
  - Fight of the Night (One time) vs. Gregory Rodrigues
  - Most total head strikes landed in a fight in UFC Middleweight division history (254) (vs. John Phillips)
- Yawara FC
  - Yawara FC Middleweight Championship (One time)

== Mixed martial arts record ==
Professional record breakdown
| 26 matches | 19 wins | 7 losses |
| By knockout | 5 | 1 |
| By submission | 6 | 2 |
| By decision | 8 | 4 |

| Res. | Record | Opponent | Method | Event | Date | Round | Time | Location | Notes |
|---|---|---|---|---|---|---|---|---|---|
| Loss | 19–7 | Ikram Aliskerov | Decision (unanimous) | UFC 321 | October 25, 2025 | 3 | 5:00 | Abu Dhabi, United Arab Emirates | |
| Win | 19–6 | Ismail Naurdiev | Decision (unanimous) | UFC on ABC: Hill vs. Rountree Jr. | June 21, 2025 | 3 | 5:00 | Baku, Azerbaijan | Naurdiev was deducted two points in round 2 due to an illegal knee. |
| Win | 18–6 | Brad Tavares | Decision (split) | UFC Fight Night: Royval vs. Taira | October 12, 2024 | 3 | 5:00 | Las Vegas, Nevada, United States | |
| Loss | 17–6 | André Muniz | Decision (split) | UFC Fight Night: Song vs. Gutiérrez | December 9, 2023 | 3 | 5:00 | Las Vegas, Nevada, United States | |
| Win | 17–5 | Albert Duraev | Submission (rear-naked choke) | UFC on ESPN: Holm vs. Bueno Silva | July 15, 2023 | 2 | 4:45 | Las Vegas, Nevada, United States | |
| Win | 16–5 | Denis Tiuliulin | Technical Submission (rear-naked choke) | UFC Fight Night: Lewis vs. Spivac | February 4, 2023 | 1 | 4:05 | Las Vegas, Nevada, United States | |
| Win | 15–5 | Joseph Holmes | Submission (rear-naked choke) | UFC Fight Night: Kattar vs. Allen | October 29, 2022 | 2 | 3:04 | Las Vegas, Nevada, United States | |
| Win | 14–5 | Eryk Anders | Decision (split) | UFC Fight Night: Holm vs. Vieira | May 21, 2022 | 3 | 5:00 | Las Vegas, Nevada, United States | |
| Loss | 13–5 | Gregory Rodrigues | KO (punches) | UFC Fight Night: Costa vs. Vettori | October 23, 2021 | 2 | 3:13 | Las Vegas, Nevada, United States | Fight of the Night. |
| Win | 13–4 | Tafon Nchukwi | Decision (majority) | UFC on ESPN: Rodriguez vs. Waterson | May 8, 2021 | 3 | 5:00 | Las Vegas, Nevada, United States | Nchukwi was deducted one point in round 2 due to repeated groin strikes. |
| Win | 12–4 | John Phillips | Decision (unanimous) | UFC Fight Night: Ortega vs. The Korean Zombie | October 17, 2020 | 3 | 5:00 | Abu Dhabi, United Arab Emirates | |
| Win | 11–4 | Marc-André Barriault | Decision (unanimous) | UFC Fight Night: Edgar vs. The Korean Zombie | December 21, 2019 | 3 | 5:00 | Busan, South Korea | |
| Loss | 10–4 | Anthony Hernandez | Submission (anaconda choke) | UFC Fight Night: Andrade vs. Zhang | 31 August 2019 | 2 | 4:39 | Shenzhen, China | |
| Win | 10–3 | Matvey Ivanenko | TKO (punches) | Real Fight: Double Impact | December 8, 2018 | 3 | 0:58 | Khabarovsk, Russia | Won the Yawara FC Middleweight Championship. |
| Win | 9–3 | Glenn Sparv | Decision (unanimous) | RFC Way of the Dragon 2 | July 7, 2018 | 3 | 5:00 | Taipei City, Taiwan | Return to Middleweight. |
| Win | 8–3 | John Vake | TKO (punches) | Hex Fight Series 13 | March 23, 2018 | 2 | 1:33 | Melbourne, Australia | |
| Win | 7–3 | Koji Shikuwa | TKO (punches) | HEAT 41 | December 23, 2017 | 3 | 1:57 | Nagoya, Japan | Middleweight bout. |
| Win | 6–3 | Jung Se-yoon | Submission (rear-naked choke) | Top FC 15 | July 22, 2017 | 1 | 2:25 | Seoul, South Korea | |
| Win | 5–3 | Ray Cooper III | Submission (anaconda choke) | Pacific Xtreme Combat 56 | March 25, 2017 | 1 | N/A | Hagåtña, Guam | |
| Win | 4–3 | Grigoriy Sirenko | Submission (rear-naked choke) | Modern Fighting Pankration 204 | November 5, 2016 | 1 | 2:23 | Vladivostok, Russia | Catchweight (176 lb) bout. |
| Loss | 3–3 | Shavkat Rakhmonov | Submission (rear-naked choke) | Kazakhstan MMA Federation: Battle of Nomads 9 | August 7, 2016 | 2 | 1:51 | Hwasun, South Korea | Catchweight (176 lb) bout. |
| Win | 3–2 | Oleg Olenichev | TKO (retirement) | Art of War 16 | January 16, 2016 | 1 | 10:00 | Beijing, China | |
| Loss | 2–2 | Son Sung-won | Decision (split) | Top FC 9 | October 24, 2015 | 3 | 5:00 | Incheon, South Korea | |
| Win | 2–1 | Kim Jae-woong | KO (knee) | Top FC 6 | April 5, 2015 | 2 | N/A | Seoul, South Korea | Middleweight bout. |
| Win | 1–1 | Kim Yul | Decision (unanimous) | Top FC 5 | February 7, 2015 | 3 | 5:00 | Busan, South Korea | Welterweight debut. |
| Loss | 0–1 | Kim Jae-young | Decision (unanimous) | Top FC: National League 1 | December 8, 2013 | 2 | 5:00 | Seoul, South Korea | Middleweight debut. |

== See also ==
- List of current UFC fighters
- List of male mixed martial artists
