= Jared Cannonier =

American mixed martial artist (born 1984)

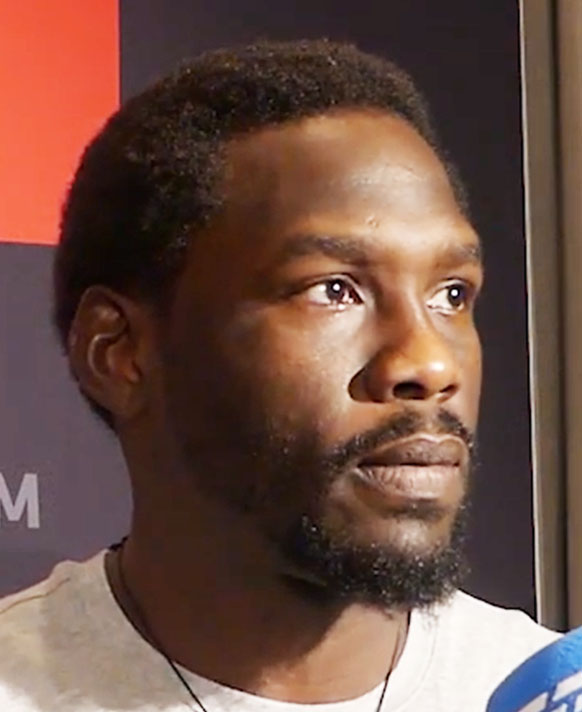
- Cannonier at UFC Fight Night 160 in 2019
- Born: Jared Christopher Cannonier; March 16, 1984 (age 42); Dallas, Texas, U.S.
- Other names: Tha Killa Gorilla
- Height: 6 ft 0 in (183 cm)
- Weight: 185 lb (84 kg; 13 st 3 lb)
- Division: Middleweight (2018–present); Light Heavyweight (2016–2018); Heavyweight (2011–2016)
- Reach: 77 1/2 in (197 cm)
- Stance: Orthodox
- Fighting out of: Phoenix, Arizona, U.S.
- Team: Legacy Jiu Jitsu Alaska; MMA Lab (2017–present)
- Rank: Brown belt in Brazilian Jiu-Jitsu
- Years active: 2011–present

Mixed martial arts record
- Total: 29
- Wins: 18
- By knockout: 11
- By submission: 2
- By decision: 5
- Losses: 11
- By knockout: 3
- By decision: 8

Other information
- Mixed martial arts record from Sherdog

Jared Christopher Cannonier (born March 16, 1984) is an American professional mixed martial artist. He currently competes in the Middleweight division of the Ultimate Fighting Championship (UFC).

== Mixed martial arts career ==
=== Early career ===
Cannonier began his amateur mixed martial arts career in early 2011, winning his first two fights by knockout. In June 2011, he made his professional MMA debut in Alaska. He fought sporadically over the next five years, amassing a record of 7–0.

=== Ultimate Fighting Championship ===
==== 2015 ====
In October 2014, it was announced that Cannonier had signed with the UFC. In his debut he faced Shawn Jordan in a Heavyweight bout at UFC 182 on January 3, 2015. He lost the fight via knockout in the first round.

Replacing injured Matt Van Buren, Cannonier was scheduled to face Jonathan Wilson at UFC Fight Night 73 on August 8, 2015. In turn, Cannonier was forced to pull out due to an injury and was replaced by Chris Dempsey.

==== 2016 ====
After an 18-month long layoff, Cannonier returned to face Cyril Asker on April 10, 2016, at UFC Fight Night: Rothwell vs. dos Santos. He defeated Asker by knockout due to a combination of elbows and punches. The win also earned Cannonier his first Performance of the Night bonus award.

In his third fight for the promotion, Cannonier moved down to the light heavyweight division. He faced Ion Cuțelaba on December 3, 2016, at The Ultimate Fighter 24 Finale. Cannonier won the fight by unanimous decision. The bout also won Cannonier his second consecutive bonus award as he and Cuțelaba won Fight of the Night.

==== 2017 ====
As the first fight of his new six-fight contract, Cannonier faced Glover Teixeira on February 11, 2017, at UFC 208. He lost the fight by unanimous decision.

Cannonier was expected to face Steve Bossé on July 7, 2017, at The Ultimate Fighter 25 Finale. However, Bossé was removed from the fight just days before the event and was replaced by promotional newcomer Nick Roehrick. Cannonier won the fight via TKO in the third round.

Cannonier was expected to face Antônio Rogério Nogueira on December 16, 2017, at UFC on Fox 26. However, on October 19, it was announced that Nogueira was pulled from the card after being notified by USADA of a potential doping violation. Cannonier would face Jan Błachowicz instead. He lost the fight via unanimous decision.

==== 2018 ====
Cannonier faced Dominick Reyes on May 19, 2018, at UFC Fight Night 129. He lost the fight via TKO in the first round.

Cannonier was expected to face Alessio Di Chirico in a middleweight bout on November 17, 2018, at UFC Fight Night 140. However, it was reported on October 19, 2018, that Cannonier would face David Branch at UFC 230 instead. He won the fight via technical knockout in round two. This win earned him the Performance of the Night award.

==== 2019 ====
Cannonier faced former UFC Middleweight champion Anderson Silva on May 11, 2019, at UFC 237. He won the fight via TKO in the first round after a kick to Silva's right leg rendered him unable to continue.

Cannonier faced Jack Hermansson on September 28, 2019, in the main event of UFC on ESPN+ 18. He was victorious via second-round TKO. The win also earned Cannonier his third Performance of the Night bonus award.

==== 2020 ====
Cannonier was scheduled to face former UFC Middleweight Champion Robert Whittaker on March 7, 2020, at UFC 248. However, on January 15, 2020, it was announced Whittaker pulled out of the bout for undisclosed reasons.

Cannonier was slated to serve as a backup fighter for the UFC Middleweight Championship fight between Israel Adesanya and Yoel Romero at UFC 248 on March 7, 2020, however, on February 14, 2020, Cannonier announced he had suffered a torn pectoral muscle and expects to be out of action for six months.

Cannonier faced Robert Whittaker on October 24, 2020 at UFC 254. Cannonier lost the fight via unanimous decision. After the fight, Cannonier revealed in an Instagram post that he suffered a broken arm from a kick that Whittaker landed in the first round.

==== 2021 ====
Cannonier was scheduled to face Paulo Costa on August 21, 2021, at UFC on ESPN 29. However, on June 4, Costa withdrew from the bout, claiming he never signed the bout agreement and had issues with his payment, while not confirming them as the reason for his withdrawal. It was later confirmed that Kelvin Gastelum replaced Costa. Cannonier won the fight via unanimous decision.

==== 2022 ====
As the first bout of his new six-fight contract, Cannonier was scheduled to face Derek Brunson on January 22, 2022, at UFC 270. However, for undisclosed reasons the bout was moved to UFC 271 on February 12, 2022. He won the fight via knockout in round two. The win earned him a Performance of the Night bonus award.

Cannonier faced Israel Adesanya for the UFC Middleweight Championship on July 2, 2022, at UFC 276. He lost the bout via unanimous decision.

Cannonier was scheduled to face Sean Strickland on October 15, 2022 at UFC Fight Night 212. However, the bout was scrapped after Strickland withdrew due to a finger infection. The pair was rebooked for UFC Fight Night 216 on December 17, 2022. Cannonier won the fight via split decision.

==== 2023 ====
Cannonier faced Marvin Vettori on June 17, 2023 at UFC on ESPN 47. Cannonier won the bout via unanimous decision, in the process setting the record for most significant strikes landed in a bout in UFC middleweight history with 241 significant strikes. The win also earned Cannonier his second Fight of the Night bonus award.

Cannonier was scheduled to face Roman Dolidze on December 2, 2023, at UFC on ESPN 52. However, he suffered an MCL tear in October during training and was pulled from the bout.

==== 2024 ====
Cannonier faced Nassourdine Imavov at UFC on ESPN 57 on June 8, 2024. He lost the bout via technical knockout in the fourth round. The stoppage was considered controversial, with some deeming it premature.

Cannonier faced Caio Borralho in the main event on August 24, 2024 at UFC on ESPN 62. He lost the fight by unanimous decision. This fight earned him another Fight of the Night award.

==== 2025 ====
Cannonier faced former LFA Middleweight Champion Gregory Rodrigues in the main event on February 15, 2025 at UFC Fight Night 251. He won the fight by technical knockout in the fourth round. This fight earned him another Fight of the Night award.

Cannonier faced Michael Page on August 16, 2025 at UFC 319. He lost the fight via unanimous decision.

==== 2026 ====
Cannonier faced Christian Leroy Duncan on July 18, 2026 at UFC Fight Night 281. He lost the fight by unanimous decision.

Cannonier faced Ikram Aliskerov on November 21, 2026 at UFC Fight Night 294. He lost the fight by unanimous decision.

== Personal life ==
Prior to embarking on a mixed martial arts career, Cannonier served in the United States Army. After three years of service, he was discharged from the army due to testing positive for marijuana, and worked in Alaska until being signed to the UFC.

== Championships and accomplishments ==
=== Mixed martial arts ===
- Ultimate Fighting Championship
  - Fight of the Night (Four times) vs. Ion Cuțelaba, Marvin Vettori, Caio Borralho and Gregory Rodrigues
  - Performance of the Night (Four times) vs. Cyril Asker, David Branch, Jack Hermansson, and Derek Brunson
  - Most significant strikes landed in a UFC Middleweight bout (+241 vs. Marvin Vettori)
  - Fourth most significant strikes landed in a fight in UFC history (+241 vs. Marvin Vettori)
  - One of five fighters (Conor McGregor, Vitor Belfort, Robert Whittaker & Max Holloway) to have knockout victories in three different weight classes
  - UFC.com Awards
    - 2018: Ranked #3 Upset of the Year vs. David Branch
- Alaska Fighting Championship
  - AFC Heavyweight Championship (One time)
- World MMA Awards
  - July 1, 2024 – December 31, 2025 Comeback of the Year vs. Gregory Rodrigues at UFC Fight Night: Cannonier vs. Rodrigues
- MMA Junkie
  - 2023 June Fight of the Month vs. Marvin Vettori

== Mixed martial arts record ==
Professional record breakdown
29 matches	18 wins	11 losses
By knockout	11	3
By submission	2	0
By decision	5	8

Res.	Record	Opponent	Method	Event	Date	Round	Time	Location	Notes
Loss	18–11	Ikram Aliskerov	Decision (unanimous)	UFC Fight Night: Procházka vs. Stirling	November 21, 2026	3	5:00	Al Rayyan, Qatar	
Loss	18–10	Christian Leroy Duncan	Decision (unanimous)	UFC Fight Night: du Plessis vs. Usman	July 18, 2026	3	5:00	Oklahoma City, Oklahoma, United States	
Loss	18–9	Michael Page	Decision (unanimous)	UFC 319	August 16, 2025	3	5:00	Chicago, Illinois, United States	
Win	18–8	Gregory Rodrigues	TKO (punches)	UFC Fight Night: Cannonier vs. Rodrigues	February 15, 2025	4	0:21	Las Vegas, Nevada, United States	Fight of the Night.
Loss	17–8	Caio Borralho	Decision (unanimous)	UFC on ESPN: Cannonier vs. Borralho	August 24, 2024	5	5:00	Las Vegas, Nevada, United States	Fight of the Night.
Loss	17–7	Nassourdine Imavov	TKO (punches)	UFC on ESPN: Cannonier vs. Imavov	June 8, 2024	4	1:34	Louisville, Kentucky, United States	
Win	17–6	Marvin Vettori	Decision (unanimous)	UFC on ESPN: Vettori vs. Cannonier	June 17, 2023	5	5:00	Las Vegas, Nevada, United States	Fight of the Night.
Win	16–6	Sean Strickland	Decision (split)	UFC Fight Night: Cannonier vs. Strickland	December 17, 2022	5	5:00	Las Vegas, Nevada, United States	
Loss	15–6	Israel Adesanya	Decision (unanimous)	UFC 276	July 2, 2022	5	5:00	Las Vegas, Nevada, United States	For the UFC Middleweight Championship.
Win	15–5	Derek Brunson	KO (elbows)	UFC 271	February 12, 2022	2	4:29	Houston, Texas, United States	UFC Middleweight title eliminator. Performance of the Night.
Win	14–5	Kelvin Gastelum	Decision (unanimous)	UFC on ESPN: Cannonier vs. Gastelum	August 21, 2021	5	5:00	Las Vegas, Nevada, United States	
Loss	13–5	Robert Whittaker	Decision (unanimous)	UFC 254	October 24, 2020	3	5:00	Abu Dhabi, United Arab Emirates	
Win	13–4	Jack Hermansson	TKO (punches)	UFC Fight Night: Hermansson vs. Cannonier	September 28, 2019	2	0:27	Copenhagen, Denmark	Performance of the Night.
Win	12–4	Anderson Silva	TKO (leg kicks)	UFC 237	May 11, 2019	1	4:47	Rio de Janeiro, Brazil	
Win	11–4	David Branch	TKO (punches)	UFC 230	November 3, 2018	2	0:39	New York City, New York, United States	Middleweight debut. Performance of the Night.
Loss	10–4	Dominick Reyes	TKO (punches)	UFC Fight Night: Maia vs. Usman	May 19, 2018	1	2:55	Santiago, Chile	
Loss	10–3	Jan Błachowicz	Decision (unanimous)	UFC on Fox: Lawler vs. dos Anjos	December 16, 2017	3	5:00	Winnipeg, Manitoba, Canada	
Win	10–2	Nick Roehrick	TKO (elbows)	The Ultimate Fighter: Redemption Finale	July 7, 2017	3	2:08	Las Vegas, Nevada, United States	
Loss	9–2	Glover Teixeira	Decision (unanimous)	UFC 208	February 11, 2017	3	5:00	Brooklyn, New York, United States	
Win	9–1	Ion Cuțelaba	Decision (unanimous)	The Ultimate Fighter: Tournament of Champions Finale	December 3, 2016	3	5:00	Las Vegas, Nevada, United States	Light Heavyweight debut. Fight of the Night.
Win	8–1	Cyril Asker	KO (punches and elbows)	UFC Fight Night: Rothwell vs. dos Santos	April 10, 2016	1	2:44	Zagreb, Croatia	Performance of the Night.
Loss	7–1	Shawn Jordan	KO (punches)	UFC 182	January 3, 2015	1	2:57	Las Vegas, Nevada, United States	
Win	7–0	Tony Lopez	Decision (split)	Alaska FC 104	January 22, 2014	5	5:00	Anchorage, Alaska, United States	Won the vacant Alaska FC Heavyweight Championship.
Win	6–0	Jermaine Haughton	TKO (punches)	Alaska FC 102	October 16, 2013	1	1:50	Anchorage, Alaska, United States	
Win	5–0	Stephen Waalkes	Submission (rear-naked choke)	AK Entertainment: Tuesday Night Fights	April 30, 2013	2	2:02	Wasilla, Alaska, United States	
Win	4–0	Joshua Ofiu	TKO (punches)	Alaska FC 97	February 13, 2013	1	2:56	Anchorage, Alaska, United States	
Win	3–0	Matt Herringshaw	TKO (submission to punches)	Alaska Cage Fighting: Tribute to Veterans	October 28, 2011	1	0:29	Fairbanks, Alaska, United States	
Win	2–0	Jason Coomes	Submission (armbar)	Alaska FC 85	October 12, 2011	1	0:46	Anchorage, Alaska, United States	
Win	1–0	Alton Prince	TKO (punches)	Midnight Sun Mayhem 1	June 19, 2011	1	N/A	Fairbanks, Alaska, United States	Heavyweight debut.

Amateur record breakdown		
2 matches	2 wins	0 losses
By knockout	2	0

Res.	Record	Opponent	Method	Event	Date	Round	Time	Location	Notes
Win	2-0	Josh Aynes	TKO (punches)	Alaska FC 83	June 4, 2011	1	N/A	Anchorage, Alaska, United States	
Win	1-0	Isaac Taylor	TKO (punches)	Alaska FC 81	March 12, 2011	2	1:21	Anchorage, Alaska, United States	

== Pay-per-view bouts ==
No.	Event	Fight	Date	Venue	City	PPV Buys
1.	UFC 276	Adesanya vs. Cannonier	July 2, 2022	T-Mobile Arena	Paradise, Nevada, United States	Not Disclosed

== See also ==
- List of current UFC fighters
- List of male mixed martial artists

Awards
Preceded by Tom Aspinall	World MMA Comeback of the Year; July 1, 2024 – December 31, 2025 vs. Gregory Rodrigues at UFC Fight Night: Cannonier vs. Rodrigues	Incumbent
