= Jack Hermansson =

Swedish-Norwegian mixed martial artist (born 1988)

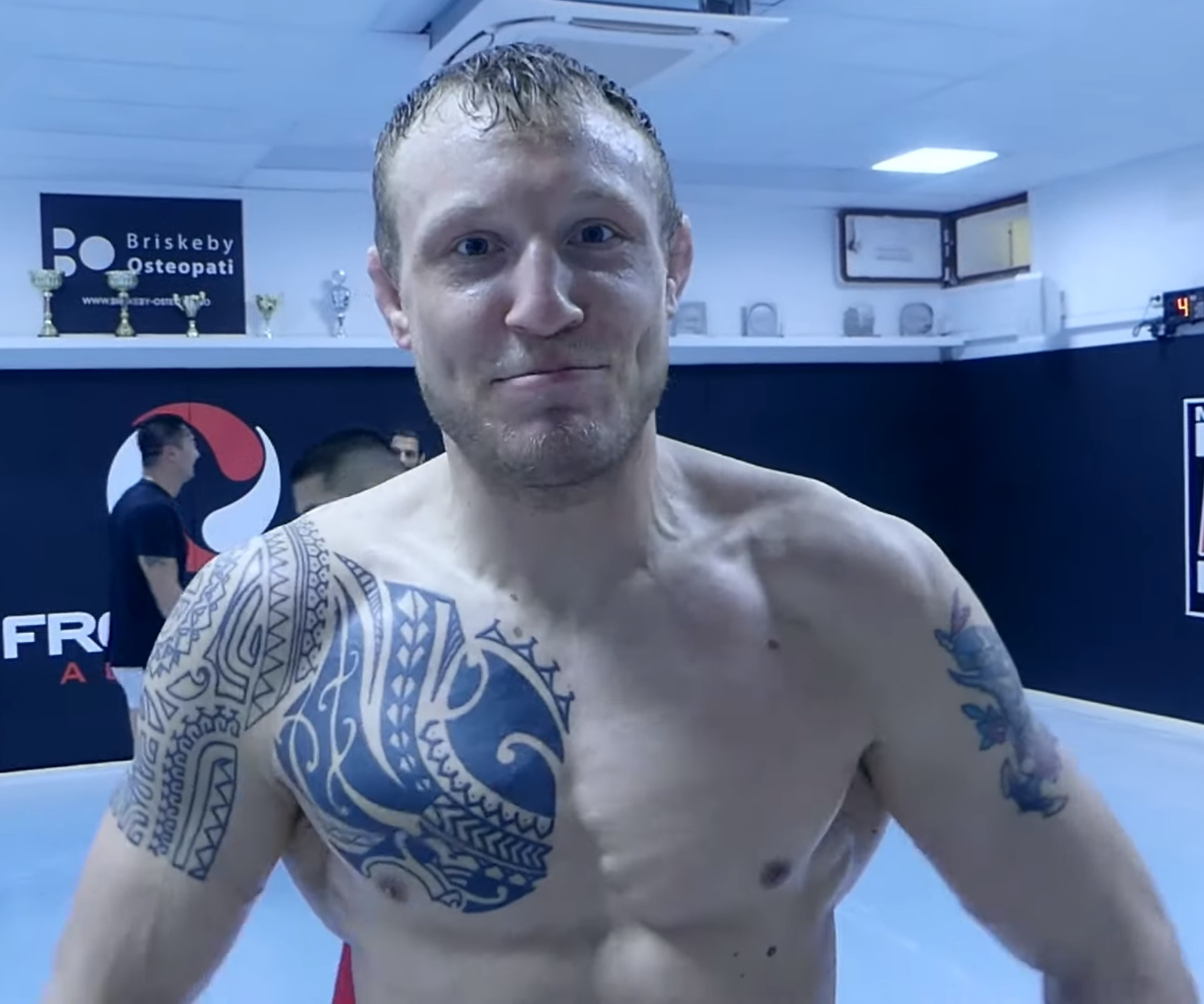
- Hermansson in 2019
- Born: Jack Berndhard Hermansson; 10 June 1988 (age 38); Uddevalla, Sweden
- Nickname: The Joker
- Nationality: Norwegian; Swedish
- Height: 6 ft 1 in (1.85 m)
- Weight: 185 lb (84 kg; 13.2 st)
- Division: Middleweight (2010–2025); Welterweight (2025–present)
- Reach: 77 in (196 cm)
- Stance: Orthodox
- Fighting out of: Oslo, Norway
- Team: Team Hellboy (formerly); Frontline Academy
- Trainer: Eduardo "Teta" Rios (Jiu Jitsu) Mohsen Bahari (Striking)
- Rank: Black belt in Brazilian jiu-jitsu
- Years active: 2010–present (MMA)

Mixed martial arts record
- Total: 33
- Wins: 24
- By knockout: 11
- By submission: 6
- By decision: 7
- Losses: 9
- By knockout: 4
- By submission: 2
- By decision: 3

Amateur record
- Total: 2
- Wins: 2
- By knockout: 2

Other information
- Website: jackhermansson.com
- Mixed martial arts record from Sherdog

Jack Berndhard Hermansson (born 10 June 1988) is a Swedish and Norwegian professional mixed martial artist. He currently competes in the middleweight division of the Ultimate Fighting Championship (UFC). Hermansson was ranked the number 3 middleweight in the world in October 2020. He is the former middleweight champion in Cage Warriors and Warrior Fight Series.

== Background ==
Hermansson was born and raised in Uddevalla, Sweden, on 10 June 1988, with six siblings. He started his martial arts career as a Greco-Roman wrestler in 1997, aged nine. Later after training some Muay Thai and other disciplines, he transitioned to mixed martial arts in 2008.

== Mixed martial arts career ==
=== Early career ===
Hermansson turned professional in 2010 and racked up a 5–0 record, all stoppages (4 KO's, 1 submission), in a little over a year. In his first fight, he won the title in the East Coast Fight Factory organization by a one-punch knockout in the third round. Two of the other victories, both by knockout, came in British top promotion Cage Warriors.

=== Bellator MMA ===
After his early career success, Hermansson was signed by Bellator MMA in 2012.

Hermansson made his promotional debut against Daniel Vizcaya on 14 December 2012, at Bellator 84. He lost the back-and-forth fight by split decision.

Hermansson next fought Jason Butcher on 21 March 2013, at Bellator 93. He lost the fight by submission due to a triangle choke.

=== Independent promotions ===
After two fights overseas, Hermansson returned to Europe and Cage Warriors.

Hermansson's first outing came against Enoc Solves Torres on 22 March 2014, at Cage Warriors 66. He won the fight by TKO in the third round.

Less than a month later Hermansson took on Ion Pascu on 18 April 2014, at Cage Warriors: Fight Night 11. He won by unanimous decision, the first decision victory of his career.

Hermansson challenged for the promotional title against veteran and fellow former Bellator fighter Norman Paraisy on 7 June 2014, at Cage Warriors 69. He became the champion after he defeated Paraisy by submission due to a rear-naked choke at the end of round 4.

Hermansson defended his title against Deyan Topalski on 22 August 2014, at Cage Warriors 71. He won the fight by TKO in the first round.

In February 2015, the Cage Warriors promotion would become inactive after changing the leading staff. When and if the organization would return to make new events were unclear. Hermansson himself would be out of action due to injuries for almost a year.

Hermansson returned in a title fight in British promotion Warrior Fight Series against UFC veteran Karlos Vemola on 1 August 2015, at Warrior Fight Series 4. He won the fight by submission due to an armbar in the first round to become the WFS champion.

Hermansson was scheduled to face Kévin Del on 29 November 2015, at Lion FC 6 for the promotional championship. However, Del would later withdraw from the contest citing an injury, and the bout was scrapped altogether.

Next Hermansson instead fought undefeated polish fighter Maciej Rozanski on 12 December 2015, at Venator FC 2. Hermansson won the fight by unanimous decision.

Hermansson was supposed to defend his WFS title on 13 February 2016, at Warrior Fight Series 5. No opponent was set, and later it was announced by the promotion that the title defense would not materialize at that event.

On 11 February 2016, after almost one and a half year of inactivity, Cage Warriors announced their return. Hermansson defended his CWFC title against Alan Carlos on the first event after the promotion's return on 15 April 2016, at Cage Warriors 75. He won the fight by knockout in the ending sequences of round three.

Hermansson faced Ireneusz Cholewa on 21 May 2016, at Venator FC 3. Hermansson won the fight via TKO in round 3.

=== Ultimate Fighting Championship ===
==== 2016 ====
On 31 May 2016, it was announced that Hermansson had signed with the UFC. He made his promotional debut against Scott Askham on 3 September 2016, at UFC Fight Night 93. He won the fight by unanimous decision.

Hermansson next faced Cezar Ferreira on 19 November 2016, at UFC Fight Night 100. He lost the fight via submission in the second round.

==== 2017 ====
Next Hermansson faced Alex Nicholson on 28 May 2017, at UFC Fight Night 109. This was the first time in his professional career that Hermansson fought in his native Sweden. He won the fight by TKO in the first round.

Hermansson next fought Brad Scott on 5 August 2017, at UFC Fight Night 114. He won the fight by TKO in the first round.

Hermansson faced Thiago Santos on 28 October 2017, at UFC Fight Night 119. He lost the fight via TKO in the first round.

==== 2018 ====
Hermansson faced Thales Leites on 12 May 2018, at UFC 224. Hermansson suffered a serious rib injury (costochondral separation) after being taken down in the first round. However, despite being in severe pain, he survived several submission attempts in the first and second round, and was able to rally back and win the fight via TKO in the third round.

Hermansson faced Gerald Meerschaert on 15 December 2018, at UFC on Fox 31. He won the fight by a guillotine choke submission in the first round.

==== 2019 ====
Hermansson next faced David Branch on 30 March 2019, at UFC on ESPN 2. He won the fight via submission due to a guillotine choke, 49 seconds into the first round. This win earned him the Performance of the Night award.

Hermansson had a quick turnaround as he replaced an injured Yoel Romero to face former Strikeforce middleweight champion Ronaldo Souza on 27 April 2019, in the main event at UFC Fight Night 150. He won the fight by unanimous decision.

On 17 July, it was reported that Hermansson signed a 6-fight deal with UFC.

Hermansson faced Jared Cannonier on 28 September 2019, in the main event of UFC Fight Night 160. He lost the fight via TKO in the second round.

==== 2020 ====
Hermansson was expected to face Chris Weidman on 2 May 2020, at UFC Fight Night: Hermansson vs. Weidman. However, on 9 April, Dana White, the president of UFC announced that the event was cancelled due to the COVID-19 pandemic.

Instead he faced Kelvin Gastelum on 19 July 2020, at UFC Fight Night 172. Hermansson won the fight by submission due to a heel hook in the first round.

Hermansson was scheduled to face Darren Till on 5 December 2020, at UFC on ESPN 19. However, Till was forced out of the bout on 6 November due to injury. Hermansson was then scheduled to face Kevin Holland at the event instead. The fight with Holland fell through on 28 November when it was revealed that Holland tested positive for COVID-19. Hermansson faced Marvin Vettori at the event instead. He lost the fight via unanimous decision. This fight earned him the Fight of the Night award.

==== 2021 ====
Hermansson was scheduled to face Edmen Shahbazyan on 15 May 2021, at UFC 262. However, due to Hermansson contracting COVID-19 the bout was postponed and took place at UFC Fight Night: Font vs. Garbrandt on 22 May 2021. He won the fight via unanimous decision after taking over with his grappling in rounds two and three.

==== 2022 ====
Hermansson faced Sean Strickland on 5 February 2022, at UFC Fight Night 200. He lost the fight via split decision.

Hermansson was scheduled to face Darren Till on 23 July 2022, at UFC Fight Night 208. Till was forced to pull out from the match due to an undisclosed injury and Hermansson instead faced Chris Curtis. He won the fight via unanimous decision.

Hermansson was scheduled to face Derek Brunson on 3 December 2022, at UFC on ESPN 42. However, Brunson withdrew due to an undisclosed injury and was replaced by Roman Dolidze. Hermansson lost the bout via ground and pound TKO in the second round.

==== 2023 ====
Hermansson was scheduled to face Brendan Allen on 3 June 2023, at UFC on ESPN 46. However, Hermansson withdrew in late April due to an undisclosed injury.

==== 2024 ====
Hermansson faced Joe Pyfer on 10 February 2024, at UFC Fight Night 236. After being outstruck in the first two rounds, Hermansson came back in the final three rounds and ended up winning the bout by unanimous decision.

==== 2025 ====
After a 16-month layoff, Hermansson faced Gregory Rodrigues on 28 June 2025, at UFC 317. He lost the fight by knockout at the end of the first round.

Moving down to welterweight, Hermansson faced Myktybek Orolbai on 22 November 2025, at UFC Fight Night 265. He lost the fight by knockout in the first round.

== Grappling career ==
On 5 March 2016, Hermansson competed in a superfight at Oslo Submission Series 2 against Norwegian black belt Christopher Hermanstad. He won via armbar in overtime under EBI rules.

Hermansson competed against fellow UFC contender Khamzat Chimaev in a freestyle wrestling match on 19 November 2021, at Sweden-based Bulldog Fight Night 9, losing 8–0 on points.

== Personal life ==
Hermansson was raised in Uddevalla, Sweden with his six siblings before moving to Norway when he was 19 years old to find work. He settled in Oslo, where he also started training in MMA. He has said that he identifies as both Swedish and Norwegian, and when he fights, he represents both Sweden and Norway. Before focusing full-time on his fighting career he had various jobs, including working in a pet store, being a bartender and as a substitute teacher.

He and his girlfriend, Nora, have been in a relationship since 2012.

== Championships and accomplishments ==
=== Mixed martial arts ===
- Ultimate Fighting Championship
  - Fight of the Night (One time) vs. Marvin Vettori
  - Performance of the Night (One time) vs. David Branch
  - Most significant body strikes landed in a UFC middleweight bout (64) vs. Sean Strickland
  - Most total strikes attempted in a UFC middleweight bout (496) vs. Ronaldo Souza
  - Fifth most significant strikes landed in UFC Middleweight division history (999)
    - Fourth most total strikes landed in UFC Middleweight division history (1366)
  - UFC.com Awards
    - 2020: Ranked #7 Submission of the Year vs. Kelvin Gastelum
- Cage Warriors Fighting Championship
  - CWFC Middleweight Championship (One time)
  - Two successful title defenses
  - Undefeated in the CWFC (7–0)
- Warrior Fight Series
  - WFS Middleweight Championship (One time)
- East Coast Fight Factory
  - ECFF Middleweight Championship (One time)
- Nordic MMA Awards – MMAViking.com
  - 2014 Breakthrough Fighter of the Year
  - 2018 Nordic Fighter of the Year
  - 2018 Comeback of the Year vs. Thales Leites
  - 2019 Submission of the Year vs. David Branch
  - 2019 Fighter of the Year
  - 2020 Submission of the Year vs. Kelvin Gastelum
- CombatPress.com
  - 2019 Upset of the Year vs. Ronaldo Souza

=== Submission wrestling ===
- Oslo Submission Series
  - OSS 2 (2016) Super Fight Winner

== Mixed martial arts record ==
Professional record breakdown
34 matches	24 wins	10 losses
By knockout	11	5
By submission	6	2
By decision	7	3

Res.	Record	Opponent	Method	Event	Date	Round	Time	Location	Notes
Loss	24–10	Myktybek Orolbai	KO (punch)	UFC Fight Night: Tsarukyan vs. Hooker	22 November 2025	1	2:46	Al Rayyan, Qatar	Welterweight debut.
Loss	24–9	Gregory Rodrigues	KO (punch)	UFC 317	28 June 2025	1	4:21	Las Vegas, Nevada, United States	
Win	24–8	Joe Pyfer	Decision (unanimous)	UFC Fight Night: Hermansson vs. Pyfer	10 February 2024	5	5:00	Las Vegas, Nevada, United States	
Loss	23–8	Roman Dolidze	TKO (punches)	UFC on ESPN: Thompson vs. Holland	3 December 2022	2	4:06	Orlando, Florida, United States	
Win	23–7	Chris Curtis	Decision (unanimous)	UFC Fight Night: Blaydes vs. Aspinall	23 July 2022	3	5:00	London, England	
Loss	22–7	Sean Strickland	Decision (split)	UFC Fight Night: Hermansson vs. Strickland	5 February 2022	5	5:00	Las Vegas, Nevada, United States	
Win	22–6	Edmen Shahbazyan	Decision (unanimous)	UFC Fight Night: Font vs. Garbrandt	22 May 2021	3	5:00	Las Vegas, Nevada, United States	
Loss	21–6	Marvin Vettori	Decision (unanimous)	UFC on ESPN: Hermansson vs. Vettori	5 December 2020	5	5:00	Las Vegas, Nevada, United States	Fight of the Night.
Win	21–5	Kelvin Gastelum	Submission (heel hook)	UFC Fight Night: Figueiredo vs. Benavidez 2	19 July 2020	1	1:18	Abu Dhabi, United Arab Emirates	
Loss	20–5	Jared Cannonier	TKO (punches)	UFC Fight Night: Hermansson vs. Cannonier	28 September 2019	2	0:27	Copenhagen, Denmark	
Win	20–4	Ronaldo Souza	Decision (unanimous)	UFC Fight Night: Jacaré vs. Hermansson	27 April 2019	5	5:00	Sunrise, Florida, United States	
Win	19–4	David Branch	Submission (guillotine choke)	UFC on ESPN: Barboza vs. Gaethje	30 March 2019	1	0:49	Philadelphia, Pennsylvania, United States	Performance of the Night.
Win	18–4	Gerald Meerschaert	Submission (guillotine choke)	UFC on Fox: Lee vs. Iaquinta 2	15 December 2018	1	4:25	Milwaukee, Wisconsin, United States	
Win	17–4	Thales Leites	TKO (punches)	UFC 224	12 May 2018	3	2:10	Rio de Janeiro, Brazil	
Loss	16–4	Thiago Santos	TKO (punches)	UFC Fight Night: Brunson vs. Machida	28 October 2017	1	4:59	São Paulo, Brazil	
Win	16–3	Brad Scott	TKO (punches)	UFC Fight Night: Pettis vs. Moreno	5 August 2017	1	3:50	Mexico City, Mexico	
Win	15–3	Alex Nicholson	TKO (punches)	UFC Fight Night: Gustafsson vs. Teixeira	28 May 2017	1	2:00	Stockholm, Sweden	
Loss	14–3	Cezar Ferreira	Submission (arm-triangle choke)	UFC Fight Night: Bader vs. Nogueira 2	19 November 2016	2	2:11	São Paulo, Brazil	
Win	14–2	Scott Askham	Decision (unanimous)	UFC Fight Night: Arlovski vs. Barnett	3 September 2016	3	5:00	Hamburg, Germany	
Win	13–2	Ireneusz Cholewa	TKO (punches)	Venator FC 3	23 May 2016	3	1:05	Milan, Italy	
Win	12–2	Alan Carlos	TKO (punches)	Cage Warriors 75	15 April 2016	3	4:45	London, England	Defended the Cage Warriors Middleweight Championship.
Win	11–2	Maciej Różański	Decision (unanimous)	Venator FC 2	12 December 2015	3	5:00	Rimini, Italy	
Win	10–2	Karlos Vémola	Submission (armbar)	Warrior Fight Series 4	1 August 2015	1	2:08	London, England	Won the vacant WFS Middleweight Championship.
Win	9–2	Deyan Topalski	TKO (punches)	Cage Warriors 71	22 August 2014	1	4:09	Amman, Jordan	Defended the Cage Warriors Middleweight Championship.
Win	8–2	Norman Paraisy	Submission (rear-naked choke)	Cage Warriors 69	7 June 2014	4	4:49	London, England	Won the vacant Cage Warriors Middleweight Championship.
Win	7–2	Ion Pascu	Decision (unanimous)	Cage Warriors: Fight Night 11	18 April 2014	3	5:00	Amman, Jordan	
Win	6–2	Enoc Solves Torres	TKO (submission to punches)	Cage Warriors 66	22 March 2014	3	4:36	Ballerup, Denmark	
Loss	5–2	Jason Butcher	Submission (triangle choke)	Bellator 93	21 March 2013	1	2:24	Lewiston, Maine, United States	
Loss	5–1	Daniel Vizcaya	Decision (split)	Bellator 84	14 December 2012	3	5:00	Hammond, Indiana, United States	
Win	5–0	Mike Ling	KO (punches)	Cage Warriors: Fight Night 2	8 September 2011	1	3:30	Amman, Jordan	
Win	4–0	Andor Filo	KO (punch)	World FC 2	9 July 2011	1	0:28	London, England	
Win	3–0	Ali Arish	KO (punch and head kick)	Cage Warriors 41	24 April 2011	2	1:39	London, England	
Win	2–0	Ian Farquharson	Submission (rear-naked choke)	Into the Cage 1	20 November 2010	1	0:43	Andover, England	
Win	1–0	Chris Greig	KO (punch)	East Coast Fight Factory: Impact	1 July 2010	3	0:46	Norwich, England	Middleweight debut. Won the ECFF Middleweight Championship.

== Amateur mixed martial arts record ==
Professional record breakdown
2 matches	2 wins	0 losses
By knockout	2	0

Res.	Record	Opponent	Method	Event	Date	Round	Time	Location	Notes
Win	2–0	Martin Johansson	TKO (knees)	Adrenaline 4: The New Generation	13 February 2010	2	N/A	Copenhagen, Denmark	
Win	1–0	Martin Lavin	TKO (punches)	Swedish Shootfighting League 09: Shoot Challenge 5	23 May 2009	2	1:02	Stockholm, Sweden	
