= Gregory Rodrigues =

Brazilian mixed martial artist (born 1992)

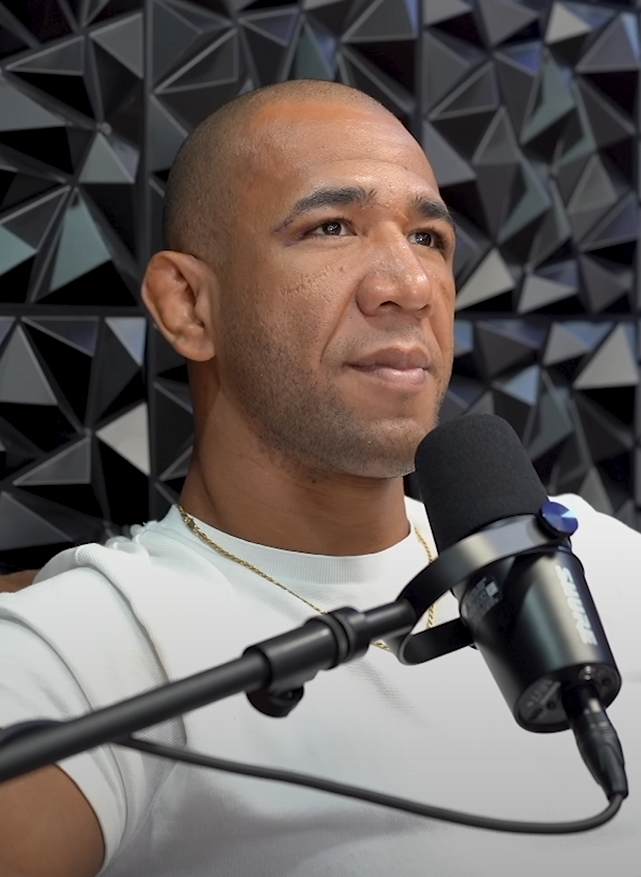
- Rodrigues in 2024
- Born: Gregory Felipe Santos Rodrigues; February 17, 1992 (age 34); Porto Velho, Rondônia, Brazil
- Nickname: Robocop
- Height: 6 ft 3 in (1.91 m)
- Weight: 185 lb (84 kg; 13 st 3 lb)
- Division: Middleweight
- Reach: 75 in (191 cm)
- Fighting out of: Deerfield Beach, Florida, U.S.
- Team: X-Gym (formerly); Usina de Campeões (formerly); Black House (2018–2020); Kings MMA (2020–2021); Kill Cliff FC (2021–present)
- Rank: Black belt in Brazilian Jiu-Jitsu under Henrique Machado
- Years active: 2014–present

Mixed martial arts record
- Total: 26
- Wins: 20
- By knockout: 12
- By submission: 3
- By decision: 5
- Losses: 6
- By knockout: 4
- By decision: 2

Other information
- Mixed martial arts record from Sherdog

Gregory Felipe Santos Rodrigues (born February 17, 1992) is a Brazilian professional mixed martial artist who currently competes in the Middleweight division of the Ultimate Fighting Championship (UFC). He is an eight-time National BJJ Champion. He was the Smash Global MMA Middleweight Champion and former Legacy Fighting Alliance (LFA) Middleweight Champion. As of August 22, 2026, he is #7 in the Meta UFC middleweight rankings.

== Background ==
Born in Porto Velho, Gregory came to Manaus when he was still four months old. He was introduced to martial arts since he was five years old, starting out with capoeira, before migrating to jiu-jitsu at 8 years old and eventually becoming a black belt under Senseí Henrique Machado, who was also Ronaldo “Jacare” Souza’s jiu-jitsu coach. He became an eight-time national jiu-jitsu champion, jiu-jitsu world champion, and professional world champion in Abu Dhabi. He also trained in Olympic wrestling with professor Waldeci, joining the Brazilian wrestling cadet team and becoming the runner-up at Pan American wrestling championships in Nicaragua. In 2014, he moved to Rio de Janeiro to start his professional MMA career.

== Mixed martial arts career ==
=== Early career ===
Starting his professional career in 2014, Rodrigues went 7–2 fighting mostly on the Brazilian regional scene, picking up wins in promotions such as ACB, where he picked up a first-round TKO victory at ACB 73 and winning the Smash Global Middleweight title also picking up a unanimous decision win at LFA 71.

He was invited to compete against Jordan Williams at Dana White's Contender Series 33 on September 15, 2020. He lost the fight via first-round knockout.

He would make his return to LFA, entering the four-man tournament for the LFA Middleweight Championship. In the first round, Rodrigues faced Al Matavao at LFA 102, where he knocked Matavao out in the second round. In the finals at LFA 108, Rodrigues stopped Josh Fremd within a round to claim the vacant LFA Middleweight Championship. Within days off the victory, Rodrigues was asked to compete in the UFC on short notice.

=== Ultimate Fighting Championship ===
Rodrigues, as a replacement for Maki Pitolo, faced Duško Todorović on June 5, 2021, at UFC Fight Night 189. He won the bout via unanimous decision.

Rodrigues faced Jun Yong Park on October 23, 2021, at UFC Fight Night 196. He won the fight via knockout in round two. This fight earned him Fight of the Night award.

Rodrigues faced Armen Petrosyan on February 26, 2022, at UFC Fight Night 202. He lost the fight via controversial split decision. 10 out of 14 media outlets scored the fight for Rodrigues.

Rodrigues faced Julian Marquez, replacing Wellington Turman, on June 18, 2022, at UFC on ESPN 37. He won the bout in the first round via knockout. This win earned him his first Performance of the Night award.

Rodrigues faced Chidi Njokuani on September 17, 2022, at UFC Fight Night 210. He won the fight via technical knockout in round two. This fight earned him the Fight of the Night award.

Rodrigues was scheduled to face Brad Tavares on January 21, 2023, at UFC 283. However, Tavares withdrawn from the bout due to an injury, and he was replaced by promotional newcomer Brunno Ferreira. He lost the fight via knockout in the first round.

Rodrigues faced Denis Tiuliulin on August 19, 2023, at UFC 292. The bout was originally set for June 24, 2023, at UFC on ABC 5, but was postponed after Tiuliulin withdrew due to undisclosed reasons. He won the bout via knockout in round one.

Rodrigues faced Brad Tavares on February 10, 2024, at UFC Fight Night 236. He won the bout by technical knockout in the third round.

As a replacement for Robert Bryczek who withdrew for unknown reasons, Rodrigues faced Christian Leroy Duncan on July 27, 2024 at UFC 304. He won the fight by unanimous decision.

Rodrigues faced former UFC Middleweight Championship challenger Jared Cannonier in the main event on February 15, 2025, at UFC Fight Night 251. He lost the fight by technical knockout in the fourth round. This fight earned him another Fight of the Night award.

Rodrigues faced Jack Hermansson on June 28, 2025, at UFC 317. He won the fight by knockout at the end of the first round. This fight earned him another Performance of the Night award.

Rodrigues faced Roman Kopylov on November 15, 2025, at UFC 322. He won the fight by unanimous decision.

Rodrigues faced Brunno Ferreira in a rematch on March 7, 2026, at UFC 326, replacing Paulo Costa, who withdrew for undisclosed reasons. He won the fight by knockout in the first round. This fight earned him a $100,000 Performance of the Night award.

Rodrigues faced fellow former LFA Middleweight Champion Anthony Hernandez in the main event on August 22, 2026 at UFC Fight Night 285. He won the fight via unanimous decision. This fight earned him another Fight of the Night award.

== Championships and accomplishments ==
- Ultimate Fighting Championship
  - Fight of the Night (Four times) vs. Jun Yong Park, Chidi Njokuani, Jared Cannonier and Anthony Hernandez
  - Performance of the Night (Three times) vs. Julian Marquez, Jack Hermansson and Brunno Ferreira 2
  - Tied (Michael Bisping, Yoel Romero, Derek Brunson & Chris Leben) for fourth most knockouts in UFC Middleweight division history (7)
  - UFC Honors Awards
    - 2022: Fan's Choice Comeback of the Year Nominee vs. Chidi Njokuani
- Legacy Fighting Alliance
  - LFA Middleweight Champion (One time)
  - LFA Middleweight Tournament
- SMASH Global
  - SMASH Global Middleweight Championship (One time)

== Mixed martial arts record ==
Professional record breakdown
26 matches	20 wins	6 losses
By knockout	12	4
By submission	3	0
By decision	5	2

Res.	Record	Opponent	Method	Event	Date	Round	Time	Location	Notes
Win	20–6	Anthony Hernandez	Decision (unanimous)	UFC Fight Night: Hernandez vs. Rodrigues	August 22, 2026	5	5:00	Sacramento, California, United States	Fight of the Night.
Win	19–6	Brunno Ferreira	KO (punch)	UFC 326	March 7, 2026	1	1:47	Las Vegas, Nevada, United States	Performance of the Night.
Win	18–6	Roman Kopylov	Decision (unanimous)	UFC 322	November 15, 2025	3	5:00	New York City, New York, United States	
Win	17–6	Jack Hermansson	KO (punch)	UFC 317	June 28, 2025	1	4:21	Las Vegas, Nevada, United States	Performance of the Night.
Loss	16–6	Jared Cannonier	TKO (punches)	UFC Fight Night: Cannonier vs. Rodrigues	February 15, 2025	4	0:21	Las Vegas, Nevada, United States	Fight of the Night.
Win	16–5	Christian Leroy Duncan	Decision (unanimous)	UFC 304	July 27, 2024	3	5:00	Manchester, England	
Win	15–5	Brad Tavares	TKO (punches)	UFC Fight Night: Hermansson vs. Pyfer	February 10, 2024	3	0:55	Las Vegas, Nevada, United States	
Win	14–5	Denis Tiuliulin	KO (elbows)	UFC 292	August 19, 2023	1	1:43	Boston, Massachusetts, United States	
Loss	13–5	Brunno Ferreira	KO (punch)	UFC 283	January 21, 2023	1	4:13	Rio de Janeiro, Brazil	
Win	13–4	Chidi Njokuani	TKO (punches)	UFC Fight Night: Sandhagen vs. Song	September 17, 2022	2	1:27	Las Vegas, Nevada, United States	Fight of the Night.
Win	12–4	Julian Marquez	KO (punches)	UFC on ESPN: Kattar vs. Emmett	June 18, 2022	1	3:18	Austin, Texas, United States	Performance of the Night.
Loss	11–4	Armen Petrosyan	Decision (split)	UFC Fight Night: Makhachev vs. Green	February 26, 2022	3	5:00	Las Vegas, Nevada, United States	
Win	11–3	Park Jun-yong	KO (punches)	UFC Fight Night: Costa vs. Vettori	October 23, 2021	2	3:13	Las Vegas, Nevada, United States	Fight of the Night.
Win	10–3	Duško Todorović	Decision (unanimous)	UFC Fight Night: Rozenstruik vs. Sakai	June 5, 2021	3	5:00	Las Vegas, Nevada, United States	
Win	9–3	Josh Fremd	KO (punches)	LFA 108	May 21, 2021	1	2:20	Sioux Falls, South Dakota, United States	Won the vacant LFA Middleweight Championship and the LFA Middleweight Tournament.
Win	8–3	Al Matavao	KO (punch)	LFA 102	March 19, 2021	2	1:02	Shawnee, Oklahoma, United States	LFA Middleweight Tournament Semifinal; Rodrigues missed weight (187.4 lb).
Loss	7–3	Jordan Williams	KO (punches)	Dana White's Contender Series 33	September 15, 2020	1	2:19	Las Vegas, Nevada, United States	
Win	7–2	Brandon Hester	KO (body kick)	SMASH Global 9	December 19, 2019	1	3:03	Hollywood, California, United States	Won the SMASH Global Middleweight Championship.
Win	6–2	Tanner Saraceno	Decision (unanimous)	LFA 71	July 12, 2019	3	5:00	Atlanta, Georgia, United States	
Win	5–2	Edilberto de Oliveira	Submission (armbar)	Jaguar Combat 1	March 16, 2018	1	4:59	Manaus, Brazil	
Win	4–2	Umar Gaisumov	TKO (punches)	ACB 73	October 21, 2017	1	2:43	Rio de Janeiro, Brazil	
Win	3–2	Robert Reed	TKO (submission to punches)	Island Fights 39	November 18, 2016	2	1:12	Pensacola, Florida, United States	
Win	2–2	Marco Aurélio	Submission (heel hook)	Face to Face 13	March 12, 2016	2	0:54	São Gonçalo, Brazil	
Loss	1–2	Renato Rangel	Decision (split)	Face to Face 11	April 24, 2015	3	5:00	Rio de Janeiro, Brazil	
Win	1–1	Douglas Carvalho	Submission (armbar)	Face to Face 9	December 19, 2014	1	2:09	Rio de Janeiro, Brazil	
Loss	0–1	Bruno Lopes	TKO (punches)	Jungle Fight 73	September 6, 2014	1	1:05	São Paulo, Brazil	

== See also ==
- List of current UFC fighters
- List of Dana White's Contender Series alumni
- List of male mixed martial artists
