= André Muniz =

Brazilian mixed martial artist (born 1990)

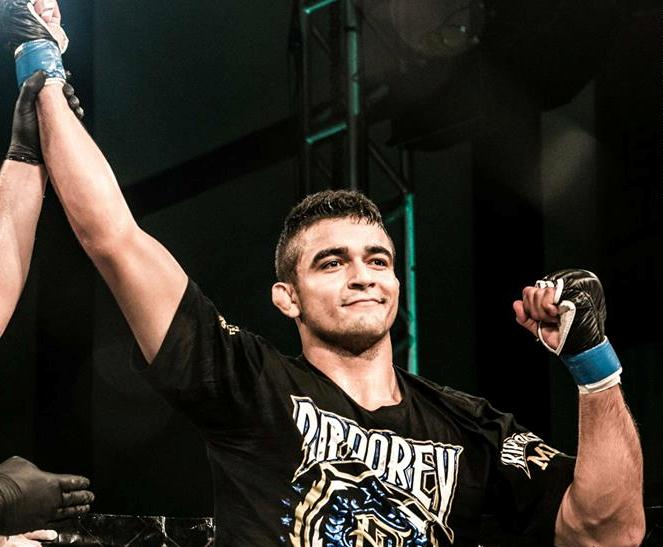
- Born: André Muniz de Aguiar; February 17, 1990 (age 36); Montes Claros, Minas Gerais, Brazil
- Other names: Sergipano
- Height: 6 ft 1 in (1.85 m)
- Weight: 185 lb (84 kg; 13 st 3 lb)
- Division: Light Heavyweight; Middleweight
- Reach: 78.0 in (198 cm)
- Stance: Southpaw
- Fighting out of: Montes Claros, Minas Gerais, Brazil
- Team: Tata Fight Team Montes Claros
- Rank: 3rd degree black belt in Brazilian Jiu-Jitsu under Otávio Duarte; Dark blue prajied in Muay Thai
- Years active: 2009–present

Mixed martial arts record
- Total: 32
- Wins: 24
- By knockout: 4
- By submission: 15
- By decision: 5
- Losses: 8
- By knockout: 7
- By submission: 1

Other information
- Mixed martial arts record from Sherdog

André Muniz de Aguiar (born February 17, 1990) is a Brazilian professional mixed martial artist who last competed in the Middleweight division of the Ultimate Fighting Championship.

== Background ==
Born in Montes Claros, Minas Gerais, Muniz was a very active teenager, which made his mother sign him up for Jiu-Jitsu classes to see if he could get calmer and more disciplined. It worked, Muniz fell in love with martial arts, and started practicing Muay Thai too. His first competition happened when he was 15 years old, a white belt championship in Montes Claros. He began practicing MMA at the age of 19, when he asked his teacher at the time to schedule a fight for him.

Muniz attended Faculdades Unidas do Norte de Minas, from where he graduated with bachelor's degree in physical education with honors.

== Mixed martial arts career ==
=== Early career ===
Muniz started his career travelling back and forth between his hometown and Rio de Janeiro, training with the likes of Thiago Santos and Luis Henrique at Tata Fight Team, and earning extra money on the side as a personal trainer to make ends meet in between fights. Starting off with a decision win over former PRIDE star and WEC middleweight champion Paulo Filho at the Bitetti Combat 19 event on February 6, 2014, Muniz would go on to win 10 out of the next 11 bouts between 2014 and 2018, culminating in being offered a chance on Dana White's Contender Series.

=== Dana White's Contender Series ===
Muniz was invited onto the Brazilian version of DWCS at Dana White's Contender Series Brazil 2 on August 11, 2018. He won a unanimous decision against Bruno Assis, but the win did not win him a UFC contract.

Almost a year later, Muniz returned to DWCS to face undefeated Taylor Johnson at Dana White's Contender Series 23 on August 6, 2019. He finished Johnson via rear-naked choke in the first round, finally winning a UFC contract.

=== Ultimate Fighting Championship ===
After two wins in Dana White's Contender Series, Muniz signed with the UFC and made his promotional debut against Antônio Arroyo at UFC Fight Night: Błachowicz vs. Jacaré on November 16, 2019. He won the fight via unanimous decision.

Muniz made his sophomore appearance against Bartosz Fabiński at UFC Fight Night: Overeem vs. Sakai on September 5, 2020. He won the fight via first-round armbar.

Muniz was scheduled to face Andrew Sanchez at UFC 257 on January 23, 2021. However, Muniz withdrew from the bout and was replaced by Makhmud Muradov.

Muniz faced multiple-time Jiu-Jitsu World Champion Ronaldo Souza at UFC 262 on May 15, 2021. He won the fight via technical submission in the first round after breaking Souza's arm in an armbar, becoming the first person to submit Souza in the process. The feat was widely recognized and named as the Submission of the Year by the mixed martial arts media and also the UFC itself.

Muniz was scheduled to face Dricus Du Plessis on December 11, 2021, at UFC 269. However, Du Plessis was removed from the event due to injury and he was replaced by Eryk Anders. He won the fight via an armbar submission in the first round.

Muniz was scheduled to face Uriah Hall on April 16, 2022, at UFC Fight Night 206 However, Hall withdrew due to undisclosed reasons, and the bout was cancelled. The bout with Hall was rescheduled for UFC 276 on July 2. He won the bout via unanimous decision.

Muniz faced Brendan Allen on February 25, 2023, at UFC Fight Night 220. He lost the fight via a rear-naked choke submission in round three.

Muniz faced Paul Craig on July 22, 2023, at UFC Fight Night 224. He lost the fight via ground and pound TKO in the second round.

Muniz faced Park Jun-yong on December 9, 2023, at UFC Fight Night 233. He won the fight via split decision. 10 out of 14 media outlets scored the contest for Park.

Muniz was scheduled to face Ikram Aliskerov on June 15, 2024, at UFC Fight Night 242. However, the bout was cancelled because Muniz suffered a foot fracture which caused him to withdraw from the event.

Muniz was re-booked to face Ikram Aliskerov on February 1, 2025 at UFC Fight Night 250. However, the bout was cancelled once again due to Muniz's and his team's visa issues and was rescheduled for April 26, 2025 at UFC on ESPN 66. Muniz lost the fight by technical knockout at the end of the first round.

Muniz faced Edmen Shahbazyan on October 4, 2025 at UFC 320. He lost the fight via knockout in round one. Following this defeat it was announced that Muniz was no longer on the UFC roster.

== Personal life ==
Muniz is the father of two daughters. In a December 2021 interview with Sherdog, Muniz said that he used the bonus money that he won for his performance against Bartosz Fabinski at UFC Fight Night: Overeem vs. Sakai to purchase a plot of land where he plans to build a home for his family.

== Championships and accomplishments ==
- Ultimate Fighting Championship
  - Performance of the Night (one time) vs. Bartosz Fabinski
  - UFC.com Awards
    - 2021: Submission of the Year vs. Ronaldo Souza
- Bitetti Combat
  - Bitetti Combat Middleweight Championship (one time)
    - One successful title defense
- MMA Junkie
  - 2021 May Submission of the Month vs. Ronaldo Souza
  - 2021 Submission of the Year vs. Ronaldo Souza
  - 2021 Under-the-Radar Fighter of the Year
- MMA Fighting
  - 2021 Submission of the Year vs. Ronaldo Souza
- Sherdog
  - 2021 Submission of the Year vs. Ronaldo Souza
- LowKickMMA
  - 2021 Submission of the Year (tied with Brandon Moreno), vs. Ronaldo Souza

== Mixed martial arts record ==
Professional record breakdown
32 matches	24 wins	8 losses
By knockout	4	7
By submission	15	1
By decision	5	0

Res.	Record	Opponent	Method	Event	Date	Round	Time	Location	Notes
Loss	24–8	Edmen Shahbazyan	KO (punches and elbows)	UFC 320	October 4, 2025	1	4:58	Las Vegas, Nevada, United States	
Loss	24–7	Ikram Aliskerov	TKO (punches)	UFC on ESPN: Machado Garry vs. Prates	April 26, 2025	1	4:54	Kansas City, Missouri, United States	
Win	24–6	Park Jun-yong	Decision (split)	UFC Fight Night: Song vs. Gutiérrez	December 9, 2023	3	5:00	Las Vegas, Nevada, United States	
Loss	23–6	Paul Craig	TKO (elbows)	UFC Fight Night: Aspinall vs. Tybura	July 22, 2023	2	4:40	London, England	
Loss	23–5	Brendan Allen	Submission (rear-naked choke)	UFC Fight Night: Muniz vs. Allen	February 25, 2023	3	4:25	Las Vegas, Nevada, United States	
Win	23–4	Uriah Hall	Decision (unanimous)	UFC 276	July 2, 2022	3	5:00	Las Vegas, Nevada, United States	
Win	22–4	Eryk Anders	Submission (armbar)	UFC 269	December 11, 2021	1	3:13	Las Vegas, Nevada, United States	
Win	21–4	Ronaldo Souza	Technical Submission (armbar)	UFC 262	May 15, 2021	1	3:59	Houston, Texas, United States	
Win	20–4	Bartosz Fabiński	Submission (armbar)	UFC Fight Night: Overeem vs. Sakai	September 5, 2020	1	2:42	Las Vegas, Nevada, United States	Performance of the Night.
Win	19–4	Antônio Arroyo	Decision (unanimous)	UFC Fight Night: Błachowicz vs. Jacaré	November 16, 2019	3	5:00	São Paulo, Brazil	
Win	18–4	Taylor Johnson	Submission (rear-naked choke)	Dana White's Contender Series 23	August 6, 2019	1	1:46	Las Vegas, Nevada, United States	
Win	17–4	Bruno Assis	Decision (unanimous)	Dana White's Contender Series Brazil 2	August 11, 2018	3	5:00	Las Vegas, Nevada, United States	Return to Middleweight.
Win	16–4	Willyanedson Paiva	Submission (armbar)	Watch Out Combat Show 49	March 24, 2018	1	0:38	Rio de Janeiro, Brazil	Catchweight (194 lb) bout.
Win	15–4	João Paulo dos Santos	TKO (punches)	Watch Out Combat Show 48	December 15, 2017	1	1:18	Rio de Janeiro, Brazil	
Loss	14–4	Azamat Murzakanov	KO (punch)	United Caucasian FC 1	October 2, 2016	1	0:50	Nalchik, Russia	
Win	14–3	Welington Lima Rafael	Submission (rear-naked choke)	War of Champions 6	April 29, 2016	1	1:30	Montes Claros, Brazil	
Win	13–3	Carlos Eduardo Tavares Silva	Submission (guillotine choke)	X-Fight MMA 12	November 14, 2015	1	0:45	Gavião Peixoto, Brazil	
Win	12–3	Flávio Rodrigo Magon	Submission (triangle choke)	X-Fight MMA 11	August 21, 2015	1	2:15	Araraquara, Brazil	Light Heavyweight debut.
Win	11–3	José Aparecido Santos Gomes	Submission (arm-triangle choke)	Coliseu Extreme Fight 12	May 9, 2015	2	4:36	Arapiraca, Brazil	
Win	10–3	Rafael Correia	Submission (brabo choke)	Face to Face 10	February 21, 2015	1	N/A	Itaboraí, Brazil	
Win	9–3	João Paulo dos Santos	Submission (arm-triangle choke)	Watch Out Combat Show 40	December 13, 2014	1	2:40	Rio de Janeiro, Brazil	
Win	8–3	Marcelo Barbosa Ramos	Submission (guillotine choke)	Watch Out Combat Show 34	May 24, 2014	1	N/A	Montes Claros, Brazil	
Win	7–3	Paulo Filho	Decision (unanimous)	Bitetti Combat 19	February 6, 2014	3	5:00	Manaus, Brazil	Defended the interim Bitetti Combat Middleweight Championship.
Loss	6–3	Júlio César dos Santos	TKO (punches)	Watch Out Combat Show 30	October 18, 2013	2	1:05	Montes Claros, Brazil	For the WOCS Middleweight Championship.
Win	6–2	Tiago Mônaco	Submission (brabo choke)	Bitetti Combat 16	July 19, 2013	1	2:48	Rio de Janeiro, Brazil	Won the interim Bitetti Combat Middleweight Championship.
Win	5–2	Daniel Oliveira	KO (punch)	Watch Out Combat Show 24	March 23, 2013	1	2:55	Montes Claros, Brazil	
Win	4–2	Rodrigo Carlos	Submission (triangle choke)	Watch Out Combat Show 22	November 9, 2012	2	0:00	Rio de Janeiro, Brazil	
Loss	3–2	Douglas Moura	TKO (punches)	Jungle Fight 39	May 12, 2012	1	2:51	Rio de Janeiro, Brazil	
Win	3–1	Wagner Silva Gomes	TKO (punches)	Fight Brazil Combat 13	October 1, 2011	2	1:15	Montes Claros, Brazil	
Loss	2–1	Júlio César dos Santos	TKO (doctor stoppage)	Bitetti Combat 9	June 18, 2011	1	5:00	Rio de Janeiro, Brazil	
Win	2–0	Paulo Victor Franco	TKO (punches)	Fight Brazil Combat 12	November 15, 2009	3	0:00	Montes Claros, Brazil	
Win	1–0	Ary Santos	Submission (triangle choke)	Fight Brazil Combat 11	April 3, 2009	1	0:00	Montes Claros, Brazil	

== See also ==
- List of Dana White's Contender Series alumni
- List of male mixed martial artists
