= UFC 276 =

2022 mixed martial arts event

UFC 276: Adesanya vs. Cannonier
- The poster for UFC 276: Adesanya vs. Cannonier
- Promotion: Ultimate Fighting Championship
- Date: July 2, 2022
- Venue: T-Mobile Arena
- City: Paradise, Nevada, United States
- Attendance: 19,649
- Total gate: $10,409,553.70

Event chronology
UFC on ESPN: Tsarukyan vs. Gamrot	UFC 276: Adesanya vs. Cannonier	UFC on ESPN: dos Anjos vs. Fiziev

UFC 276: Adesanya vs. Cannonier was a mixed martial arts event produced by the Ultimate Fighting Championship that took place on July 2, 2022, at the T-Mobile Arena in Paradise, Nevada, part of the Las Vegas Metropolitan Area, United States.

== Background ==
The event was held during the UFC's 10th annual International Fight Week. The 2022 UFC Hall of Fame induction ceremony also took place during the week.

A UFC Middleweight Championship bout between current champion Israel Adesanya and Jared Cannonier headlined the event.

A UFC Featherweight Championship trilogy bout between current champion Alexander Volkanovski and former champion Max Holloway took place at this event. The pairing first met at UFC 245, where Volkanovski defeated Holloway via unanimous decision to capture the title. Their second meeting took place at UFC 251, with Volkanovski successfully defending the title via split decision. They were originally expected to meet for the third time at UFC 272, but Holloway withdrew due to an aggravated previous injury.

A women's flyweight bout between former Strikeforce and UFC Women's Bantamweight Champion Miesha Tate and former Invicta FC Bantamweight Champion (also former UFC Women's Flyweight Championship challenger) Lauren Murphy was expected to take place at UFC on ESPN 36. However, the bout was moved to this event for unknown reasons. In turn, a week before the event, Murphy pulled out after she tested positive for COVID-19. The bout was then rescheduled to UFC on ABC: Ortega vs. Rodríguez.

A middleweight bout between Uriah Hall and André Muniz took place at the event. The pairing was originally scheduled to meet as UFC on ESPN: Luque vs. Muhammad 2 but Hall withdrew for unknown reasons.

A women's flyweight bout between former UFC Women's Flyweight Championship challenger Jessica Eye and Casey O'Neill was expected to take place at the event. However, O'Neill withdrew in late April due to a torn ACL and was replaced by Maycee Barber.

Sean Strickland was expected to face former Glory Middleweight and Light Heavyweight Champion Alex Pereira in a middleweight bout at UFC 277. However, the promotion decided to move the pairing to this event.

A lightweight bout between Bobby Green and Jim Miller was previously booked twice, but was canceled on both occasions: first at UFC 172 in April 2014, when Green pulled out due to an elbow injury. Green also pulled out of the second booking at UFC 258 in February 2021, when he collapsed after the weigh-ins and was deemed unfit to compete. They were then expected to meet at this event. In turn, Green withdrew again for unknown reasons and was replaced by former UFC Lightweight Championship challenger Donald Cerrone in a welterweight bout. Miller and Cerrone previously met 8 years prior at UFC Fight Night: Cowboy vs. Miller which Cerrone won by second-round knockout.

== Results ==
Main card
Weight class				Method	Round	Time	Notes
Middleweight	Israel Adesanya (c)	def.	Jared Cannonier	Decision (unanimous) (49–46, 49–46, 50–45)	5	5:00	(Note: For the UFC Middleweight Championship.)
Featherweight	Alexander Volkanovski (c)	def.	Max Holloway	Decision (unanimous) (50–45, 50–45, 50–45)	5	5:00	(Note: For the UFC Featherweight Championship.)
Middleweight	Alex Pereira	def.	Sean Strickland	KO (punches)	1	2:36
Welterweight	Bryan Barberena	def.	Robbie Lawler	TKO (punches)	2	4:47
Bantamweight	Pedro Munhoz	vs.	Sean O'Malley	No Contest (accidental eye poke)	2	3:09	(Note: Accidental eye poke rendered Munhoz unable to continue.)
Preliminary card (ESPN / ABC / ESPN+)
Lightweight	Jalin Turner	def.	Brad Riddell	Submission (guillotine choke)	1	0:45
Welterweight	Jim Miller	def.	Donald Cerrone	Submission (guillotine choke)	2	1:32
Welterweight	Ian Machado Garry	def.	Gabriel Green	Decision (unanimous) (30–27, 30–27, 30–27)	3	5:00
Middleweight	Dricus du Plessis	def.	Brad Tavares	Decision (unanimous) (29–28, 29–28, 29–28)	3	5:00
Early preliminary card (ESPN / ESPN+ / UFC Fight Pass)
Middleweight	André Muniz	def.	Uriah Hall	Decision (unanimous) (30–27, 30–27, 30–27)	3	5:00
Women's Flyweight	Maycee Barber	def.	Jessica Eye	Decision (unanimous) (29–28, 29–28, 30–27)	3	5:00
Women's Bantamweight	Julija Stoliarenko	def.	Jessica-Rose Clark	Submission (armbar)	1	0:42

== Bonus awards ==
The following fighters received $50,000 bonuses.

- Fight of the Night: Bryan Barberena vs. Robbie Lawler
- Performance of the Night: Alex Pereira, Jalin Turner, and Julija Stoliarenko

The following fighters received Crypto.com "Fan Bonus of the Night" awards paid in bitcoin of US$30,000 for first place, US$20,000 for second place, and US$10,000 for third place.

- First Place: Israel Adesanya
- Second Place: Alexander Volkanovski
- Third Place: Alex Pereira

== See also ==
- List of UFC events
- List of current UFC fighters
- 2022 in UFC
