= UFC Fight Night: Costa vs. Vettori =

2021 MMA event

- The poster for UFC Fight Night: Costa vs. Vettori
- Promotion: Ultimate Fighting Championship
- Date: October 23, 2021
- Venue: UFC Apex
- City: Enterprise, Nevada, United States
- Attendance: Not announced

Event chronology
UFC Fight Night: Ladd vs. Dumont	UFC Fight Night: Costa vs. Vettori	UFC 267: Błachowicz vs. Teixeira

UFC Fight Night: Costa vs. Vettori (also known as UFC Fight Night 196, UFC Vegas 41 and UFC on ESPN+ 54) was a mixed martial arts event produced by the Ultimate Fighting Championship that took place on October 23, 2021 at the UFC Apex facility in Enterprise, Nevada, part of the Las Vegas Metropolitan Area, United States.

== Background ==
A middleweight bout between former UFC Middleweight Championship title challengers Paulo Costa and Marvin Vettori headlined the event. In the days leading up to the event, the bout was shifted to a catchweight of 195 lbs and then ultimately to light heavyweight due to weight cut issues with Costa. As a result, he forfeited 20% of his fight purse to Vettori.

Aaron Phillips and Kris Moutinho was scheduled for the bantamweight bout at the event. However in mid-September, Moutinho was removed from the bout for undisclosed reasons and was replaced by Jonathan Martinez. In turn, Philips withdrew from the bout due to illness. On three days notice, promotional newcomer Zviad Lazishvili stepped in as a replacement.

A welterweight bout between Dwight Grant and Gabriel Green was briefly linked to the event. However, Green was removed from the contest in late September due to undisclosed reasons and replaced by Francisco Trinaldo.

A middleweight bout between Jamie Pickett and Laureano Staropoli was originally expected to take place at UFC Fight Night: Dern vs. Rodriguez, but it was moved to this event after one of Pickett's coaches tested positive for COVID-19.

A lightweight rematch between Alan Patrick and Mason Jones was expected to take place at the event. The pairing previously met at UFC Fight Night: Rozenstruik vs. Sakai, which ended in a no contest when an accidental eye poke rendered Patrick unable to continue. However in late October, Patrick withdrew from bout and he was replaced by newcomer David Onama.

== Results ==
Main card (ESPN+)
Weight class				Method	Round	Time	Notes
Light Heavyweight	Marvin Vettori	def.	Paulo Costa	Decision (unanimous) (48–46, 48–46, 48–46)	5	5:00	(Note: Costa was deducted 1 point in Round 2 due to an eye poke.)
Lightweight	Grant Dawson	vs.	Ricky Glenn	Draw (majority) (29–28, 28–28, 28–28)	3	5:00
Women's Bantamweight	Jessica-Rose Clark	def.	Joselyne Edwards	Decision (unanimous) (30–27, 30–27, 29–28)	3	5:00
Featherweight	Alex Caceres	def.	Seung Woo Choi	Submission (rear-naked choke)	2	3:31	(Note: Choi was deducted 1 point in Round 1 for an illegal knee.)
Welterweight	Francisco Trinaldo	def.	Dwight Grant	Decision (split) (29–27, 27–29, 29–27)	3	5:00	(Note: Trinaldo was deducted 1 point in Round 3 for an eye poke.)
Light Heavyweight	Nicolae Negumereanu	def.	Ike Villanueva	TKO (punches)	1	1:18
Preliminary card (ESPN+)
Middleweight	Gregory Rodrigues	def.	Jun Yong Park	KO (punches)	2	3:13
Lightweight	Mason Jones	def.	David Onama	Decision (unanimous) (29–28, 29–28, 29–28)	3	5:00
Women's Strawweight	Tabatha Ricci	def.	Maria de Oliveira Neta	Decision (unanimous) (30–27, 30–27, 30–27)	3	5:00
Middleweight	Jamie Pickett	def.	Laureano Staropoli	Decision (unanimous) (30–27, 30–27, 29–28)	3	5:00
Lightweight	Jai Herbert	def.	Khama Worthy	TKO (punches)	1	2:47
Flyweight	Jeff Molina	def.	Daniel Lacerda	TKO (elbows and punches)	2	0:46
Women's Strawweight	Randa Markos	def.	Lívia Renata Souza	Decision (unanimous) (30–27, 30–27, 29–28)	3	5:00
Bantamweight	Jonathan Martinez	def.	Zviad Lazishvili	Decision (unanimous) (30–27, 29–28, 29–28)	3	5:00

== Bonus awards ==
The following fighters received $50,000 bonuses.

- Fight of the Night: Gregory Rodrigues vs. Jun Yong Park
- Performance of the Night: Marvin Vettori and Alex Caceres

== See also ==
- List of UFC events
- List of current UFC fighters
- 2021 in UFC
