= UFC Fight Night: Cannonier vs. Rodrigues =

Mixed martial arts event in 2025

- The poster for UFC Fight Night: Cannonier vs. Rodrigues
- Promotion: Ultimate Fighting Championship
- Date: February 15, 2025
- Venue: UFC Apex
- City: Enterprise, Nevada, United States
- Attendance: Not announced

Event chronology
UFC 312: du Plessis vs Strickland 2	UFC Fight Night: Cannonier vs. Rodrigues	UFC Fight Night: Cejudo vs. Song

UFC Fight Night: Cannonier vs. Rodrigues (also known as UFC Fight Night 251 and UFC Vegas 102 and UFC on ESPN+ 109) was a mixed martial arts event produced by the Ultimate Fighting Championship that took place on February 15, 2025, at the UFC Apex in Enterprise, Nevada, part of the Las Vegas Valley, United States.

== Background ==
A middleweight bout between former UFC Middleweight Championship challenger Jared Cannonier and former LFA Middleweight Champion Gregory Rodrigues headlined the event.

A women's flyweight bout between The Ultimate Fighter: Team Peña vs. Team Nunes flyweight winner Juliana Miller and Carli Judice was scheduled for this event. However, Miller withdrew from the fight due to an injury, so the bout was scrapped and Judice was booked for another event.

A middleweight bout between Jacob Malkoun and Rodolfo Vieira was scheduled for this event. However, Malkoun withdrew from the fight due to an undisclosed injury. He was replaced by Andre Petroski.

A welterweight bout between Rinat Fakhretdinov and former LFA Welterweight Champion Gabriel Bonfim was scheduled for this event. However, Fakhretdinov withdrew from the fight due to an undisclosed injury and was replaced by Khaos Williams.

A welterweight bout between Billy Goff and Nikolay Veretennikov was scheduled for this event. However, Veretennikov withdrew from the fight for undisclosed reasons and Goff was moved to UFC Fight Night: Cejudo vs. Song one week later to face Adam Fugitt as a replacement.

A lightweight bout between Jared Gordon and Kauê Fernandes was scheduled for this event. However, Fernandes withdrew from the fight due to visa issues and was replaced by promotional newcomer Mashrabjon Ruziboev. In turn, although Gordon made weight, the bout was cancelled due to Ruziboev's illness.

== Results ==
Main card (ESPN+)
Weight class				Method	Round	Time	Notes
Middleweight	Jared Cannonier	def.	Gregory Rodrigues	TKO (punches)	4	0:21
Featherweight	Youssef Zalal	def.	Calvin Kattar	Decision (unanimous) (29–28, 29–28, 29–28)	3	5:00
Middleweight	Edmen Shahbazyan	def.	Dylan Budka	TKO (punches)	1	1:35
Lightweight	Nazim Sadykhov	def.	Ismael Bonfim	TKO (doctor stoppage)	1	5:00
Middleweight	Andre Petroski	def.	Rodolfo Vieira	Decision (unanimous) (29–28, 29–28, 29–28)	3	5:00
Preliminary card (ESPN+)
Featherweight	José Miguel Delgado	def.	Connor Matthews	KO (punches)	1	2:58
Women's Strawweight	Angela Hill	def.	Ketlen Souza	Decision (split) (29–28, 28–29, 29–28)	3	5:00
Flyweight	Rafael Estevam	def.	Jesús Santos Aguilar	Decision (unanimous) (29–28, 29–28, 29–28)	3	5:00
Welterweight	Gabriel Bonfim	def.	Khaos Williams	Technical Submission (brabo choke)	2	4:58
Bantamweight	Elijah Smith	def.	Vince Morales	Decision (unanimous) (29–28, 29–28, 29–28)	3	5:00
Heavyweight	Valter Walker	def.	Don'Tale Mayes	Submission (heel hook)	1	1:17
Women's Bantamweight	Jacqueline Cavalcanti	def.	Julia Avila	Decision (unanimous) (30–27, 30–27, 30–27)	3	5:00

== Bonus awards ==
The following fighters received $50,000 bonuses.

- Fight of the Night: Jared Cannonier vs. Gregory Rodrigues
- Performance of the Night: Edmen Shahbazyan and Gabriel Bonfim

== See also ==
- 2025 in UFC
- List of current UFC fighters
- List of UFC events
