= Edmen Shahbazyan =

American mixed martial artist

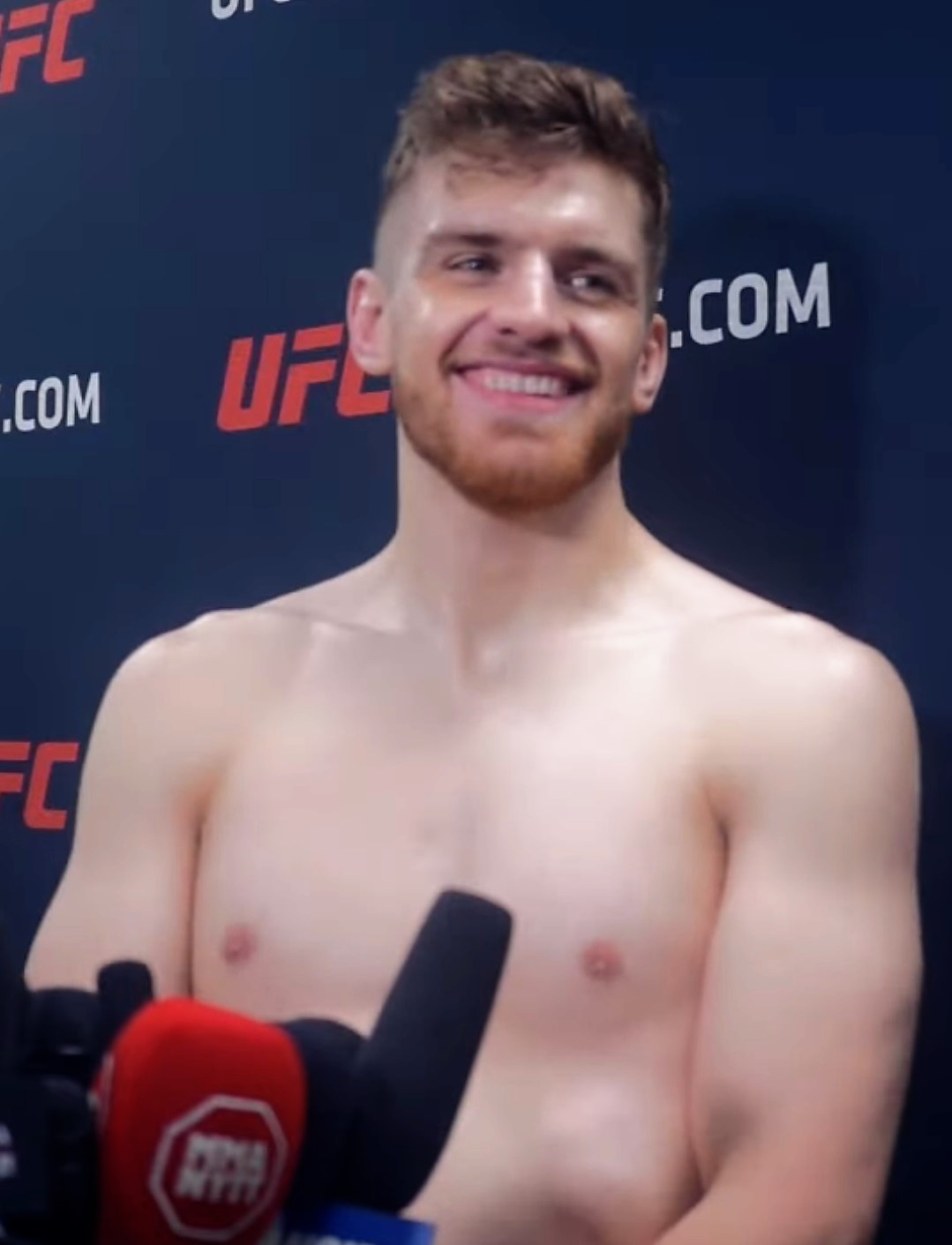
- Shahbazyan interviewed at UFC 244 in 2019
- Born: November 20, 1997 (age 28); Glendale, California, U.S.
- Other names: The Golden Boy
- Height: 6 ft 2 in (1.88 m)
- Weight: 185 lb (84 kg; 13.2 st)
- Division: Middleweight
- Reach: 74 in (188 cm)
- Fighting out of: Las Vegas, Nevada, U.S.
- Team: Glendale Fighting Club (until 2022); Xtreme Couture (2022–present); Black Kobra Striking Systems (2022–present)
- Trainer: Edmond Tarverdyan (until 2022)
- Rank: Black belt in Shotokan Karate
- Years active: 2017–present

Mixed martial arts record
- Total: 23
- Wins: 17
- By knockout: 13
- By submission: 1
- By decision: 3
- Losses: 6
- By knockout: 3
- By submission: 1
- By decision: 2

Other information
- Mixed martial arts record from Sherdog

Edmen Shahbazyan (born November 20, 1997) is an American mixed martial artist competing in the middleweight division of the Ultimate Fighting Championship (UFC). As of October 3, 2026, he is #15 in the Meta UFC middleweight rankings.

== Background ==
Edmen Shahbazyan fights out of Glendale, California. His older brother, Leon, is also a professional fighter. Edmen started training in martial arts at the age of 9 and trained at his former gym Glendale Fighting Club since the age of 12. As a teenager, he served as a training partner for Ronda Rousey. Shahbazyan initially attended Glendale High School, but transferred to Herbert Hoover High School from where he graduated. During his time in Hoover High, he wrestled and reached the CIF State Wrestling Championship tournament. Shahbazyan is of Armenian descent and has prominently displayed his heritage and support for Armenia.

== Mixed martial arts career ==
=== Early career ===
Shahbazyan made his professional debut in mixed martial arts on February 25, 2017, at CXF 6. He faced Selah Williams and won by technical knockout in the first round. Edmen continued fighting for mixed martial arts promotions in California and compiled a 6–0 record, winning all fights by first-round knockout.

Shahbazyan was invited to participate on Dana White's Contender Series 13 of Dana White's Contender Series. Edmen faced Antonio Jones, winning by technical knockout only 40 seconds into the first round. His performance led to White offering him a contract to fight in the UFC.

Edmen was formerly managed by Ronda Rousey's One Fight Management.

=== Ultimate Fighting Championship ===
Shahbazyan debuted in the UFC on November 30, 2018, at The Ultimate Fighter 28 Finale against Darren Stewart. He won the fight via split decision.

Shahbazyan's next fight was against Charles Byrd at UFC 235. He won the fight by first-round knockout.

Shahbazyan faced Jack Marshman on July 6, 2019, at UFC 239. He won the fight via a rear-naked choke submission in the first round.

Shahbazyan was expected to face Krzysztof Jotko on November 2, 2019, at UFC 244. However, Jotko withdrew from the bout and was replaced by Brad Tavares. After initially knocking Tavares down via a punch, Shahbazyan won the fight via a head kick KO in the first round.

Shahbazyan was expected to face Derek Brunson on March 7, 2020, at UFC 248. However it was announced on February 20 that the bout had been rescheduled and would take place on April 11, 2020, at UFC Fight Night: Overeem vs. Harris. Due to the COVID-19 pandemic, the event was postponed and eventually scheduled for August 1, 2020, at UFC Fight Night 173. Shahbazyan lost the fight via technical knockout in round three.

During the walkout Shahbazyan carried a flag of Nagorno-Karabakh. This was done in support after warfare and subsequent ethnic cleansing took place in the area during that time. After the bout, the Consul General of Azerbaijan in Los Angeles Nasimi Aghayev sent a protest regarding the incident to the UFC. As an outcome Shahbazyan apologized to the UFC for breaking the rules and causing controversy, and also lost his Reebok sponsor money.

Shahbazyan was scheduled to face Jack Hermansson on May 15, 2021, at UFC 262. However, for unknown reasons the bout was postponed and took place at UFC Fight Night 188 on May 22, 2021. He lost the bout via unanimous decision after being dominated by Hermansson's grappling in rounds 2 and 3.

Shahbazyan faced Nassourdine Imavov on November 6, 2021, at UFC 268. He lost the fight via TKO due to elbows from crucifix position in round two.

Shahbazyan faced Dalcha Lungiambula on December 10, 2022, at UFC 282. He won the fight via technical knockout in round two. This win earned him the Performance of the Night award.

Shahbazyan faced Anthony Hernandez on May 20, 2023, at UFC Fight Night 223. He lost the fight via technical knockout in round three.

Shahbazyan was scheduled to face Duško Todorović on March 23, 2024, at UFC on ESPN 53. However, Todorović pulled out due to a serious knee injury and was replaced by A.J. Dobson. Shahbazyan won the fight by knockout at the end of the first round.

Shahbazyan faced Gerald Meerschaert on August 24, 2024 at UFC on ESPN 62. After landing a body blow and repeated ground strikes, he lost the fight via an arm-triangle submission in the second round.

Shahbazyan faced Dylan Budka on February 15, 2025 at UFC Fight Night 251. He won the fight by technical knockout in the first round. This fight earned him another Performance of the Night award.

Shahbazyan faced Andre Petroski on June 14, 2025 at UFC on ESPN 69. He won the fight by unanimous decision.

Shahbazyan faced André Muniz on October 4, 2025 at UFC 320. He won the fight via knockout in round one.

Shahbazyan was scheduled to face Jun Yong Park on April 4, 2026 at UFC Fight Night 272. However, Park had to withdraw due to an injury, so the bout was scrapped.

Shahbazyan faced Brendan Allen on June 6, 2026, at UFC Fight Night 278. He lost the fight by unanimous decision. This fight earned him his first $100,000 Fight of the Night award.

Shahbazyan faced Brunno Ferreira on September 19, 2026 at UFC 331. He won the fight by unanimous decision.

== Championships and accomplishments ==
=== Mixed martial arts ===
- Ultimate Fighting Championship
  - Fight of the Night (One time) vs. Brendan Allen
  - Performance of the Night (Two times) vs. Dalcha Lungiambula and Dylan Budka

== Mixed martial arts record ==
Professional record breakdown
23 matches	17 wins	6 losses
By knockout	13	3
By submission	1	1
By decision	3	2

Res.	Record	Opponent	Method	Event	Date	Round	Time	Location	Notes
Win	17–6	Brunno Ferreira	Decision (unanimous)	UFC 331	September 19, 2026	3	5:00	Los Angeles, California, United States	
Loss	16–6	Brendan Allen	Decision (unanimous)	UFC Fight Night: Muhammad vs. Bonfim	June 6, 2026	3	5:00	Las Vegas, Nevada, United States	Fight of the Night.
Win	16–5	André Muniz	KO (punches and elbows)	UFC 320	October 4, 2025	1	4:58	Las Vegas, Nevada, United States	
Win	15–5	Andre Petroski	Decision (unanimous)	UFC on ESPN: Usman vs. Buckley	June 14, 2025	3	5:00	Atlanta, Georgia, United States	
Win	14–5	Dylan Budka	TKO (punches)	UFC Fight Night: Cannonier vs. Rodrigues	February 15, 2025	1	1:35	Las Vegas, Nevada, United States	Performance of the Night.
Loss	13–5	Gerald Meerschaert	Submission (arm-triangle choke)	UFC on ESPN: Cannonier vs. Borralho	August 24, 2024	2	4:12	Las Vegas, Nevada, United States	
Win	13–4	A.J. Dobson	KO (elbows and punches)	UFC on ESPN: Ribas vs. Namajunas	March 23, 2024	1	4:33	Las Vegas, Nevada, United States	
Loss	12–4	Anthony Hernandez	TKO (elbows and punches)	UFC Fight Night: Dern vs. Hill	May 20, 2023	3	1:01	Las Vegas, Nevada, United States	
Win	12–3	Dalcha Lungiambula	TKO (punches)	UFC 282	December 10, 2022	2	4:41	Las Vegas, Nevada, United States	Performance of the Night.
Loss	11–3	Nassourdine Imavov	TKO (elbows)	UFC 268	November 6, 2021	2	4:42	New York City, New York, United States	
Loss	11–2	Jack Hermansson	Decision (unanimous)	UFC Fight Night: Font vs. Garbrandt	May 22, 2021	3	5:00	Las Vegas, Nevada, United States	
Loss	11–1	Derek Brunson	TKO (punches)	UFC Fight Night: Brunson vs. Shahbazyan	August 1, 2020	3	0:26	Las Vegas, Nevada, United States	
Win	11–0	Brad Tavares	KO (head kick)	UFC 244	November 2, 2019	1	2:27	New York City, New York, United States	
Win	10–0	Jack Marshman	Submission (rear-naked choke)	UFC 239	July 6, 2019	1	1:12	Las Vegas, Nevada, United States	
Win	9–0	Charles Byrd	TKO (elbows and punches)	UFC 235	March 2, 2019	1	0:38	Las Vegas, Nevada, United States	
Win	8–0	Darren Stewart	Decision (split)	The Ultimate Fighter: Heavy Hitters Finale	November 30, 2018	3	5:00	Las Vegas, Nevada, United States	
Win	7–0	Antonio Jones	TKO (punches)	Dana White's Contender Series 13	July 17, 2018	1	0:40	Las Vegas, Nevada, United States	
Win	6–0	Daniel McWilliams	TKO (punches)	California Xtreme Fighting 12	April 21, 2018	1	0:30	Burbank, California, United States	
Win	5–0	Aaron Hamilton	TKO (punches)	California Xtreme Fighting 11	February 17, 2018	1	1:08	Los Angeles, California, United States	
Win	4–0	Anthony Thomas	TKO (punches)	Gladiator Challenge: Fight Club	October 7, 2017	1	0:14	El Cajon, California, United States	
Win	3–0	Dejon Daniels	TKO (punches)	California Xtreme Fighting 8	June 17, 2017	1	2:58	Burbank, California, United States	
Win	2–0	Dearmie Street	TKO (punches)	California Xtreme Fighting 7	April 29, 2017	1	3:16	Los Angeles, California, United States	
Win	1–0	Selah Williams	TKO (head kick and punches)	California Xtreme Fighting 6	February 25, 2017	1	0:43	Los Angeles, California, United States	Middleweight debut.

== See also ==
- List of current UFC fighters
- List of Dana White's Contender Series alumni
- List of male mixed martial artists
