= Sean Strickland =

American mixed martial artist (born 1991)

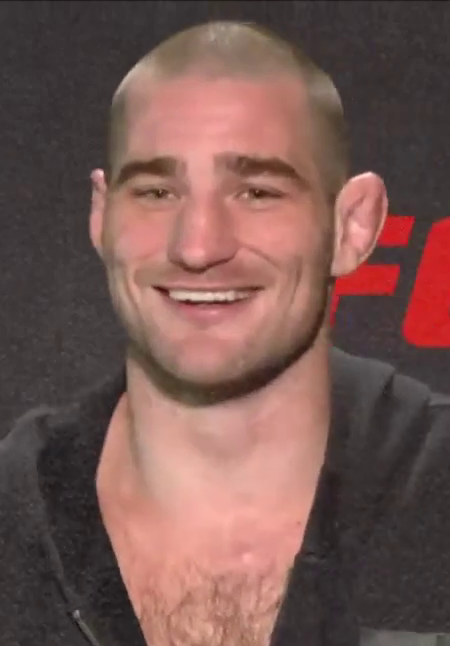
- Strickland at UFC Fight Night 200
- Born: Sean Thomas Strickland; February 27, 1991 (age 35); Anaheim, California, U.S.
- Height: 6 ft 1 in (1.85 m)
- Weight: 185 lb (84 kg; 13.2 st)
- Division: Welterweight (2008, 2015–2018); Middleweight (2009–2015, 2020–present); Light Heavyweight (2009–2010, 2023)
- Reach: 76 in (193 cm)
- Stance: Orthodox
- Fighting out of: Corona, California, U.S.
- Team: Millennia MMA Gym (2014–present); RVCA Training Center; Syndicate MMA; Xtreme Couture (2014–present)
- Trainer: Eric Nicksick
- Rank: Black belt in Brazilian jiu-jitsu
- Years active: 2008–present

Mixed martial arts record
- Total: 38
- Wins: 31
- By knockout: 12
- By submission: 4
- By decision: 15
- Losses: 7
- By knockout: 2
- By decision: 5

Other information
- Mixed martial arts record from Sherdog

Sean Thomas Strickland (born February 27, 1991) is an American professional mixed martial artist. He currently competes in the Middleweight division of the Ultimate Fighting Championship (UFC), where he is the current and two-time UFC Middleweight Champion. A professional since 2008, he is a former Middleweight Champion of the King of the Cage. As of June 16, 2026, he is #7 in the UFC men's pound-for-pound rankings.

== Early life ==
Sean Strickland grew up in Corona, California, in a household with a physically and mentally abusive father. He has one brother. During Strickland’s early childhood, he attacked his father with a guitar in an attempt to defend his mother out of fear he might kill her. Strickland fled from his house and contacted his local law enforcement leading to his father being briefly arrested. However, the next day his father was released from jail as his mother paid for his bail.

In Strickland’s adolescence, he developed a close relationship with his grandfather, who exposed him to neo-Nazi ideology. In ninth grade Strickland was expelled from school for perpetrating a hate crime; afterwards, his mother brought him to an MMA gym to help him cope with his problems. Strickland stated, "Then I started training and the moment I started training I was like...I don't hate anybody. Everyone's cool. Then a lot of people who helped me out in my life, they weren't white."

At the age of 18, Strickland had another violent altercation with his father again resulting in police involvement. However, no charges were pressed. Following this, Strickland and his mother moved out of his father’s house. During a 2024 episode on the This Past Weekend podcast, he revealed that his father had died of cancer following a long-term drug addiction.

== Mixed martial arts career ==
=== Early career ===
Strickland made his professional debut in 2008 for the King of the Cage promotion and compiled an undefeated record of 9–0 before facing Josh Bryant in a fight for the King of the Cage Middleweight Championship at KOTC: Unification on December 9, 2012. Strickland won via split decision, and then successfully defended his title three times before being signed by the UFC.

=== Ultimate Fighting Championship ===
==== 2014 ====
Strickland made his UFC debut at UFC 171 on March 15, 2014, facing Bubba McDaniel. Strickland won via rear-naked choke submission in the first round.

Strickland made his next appearance at UFC Fight Night 41 against Luke Barnatt on May 31, 2014. Strickland won via split decision. 11 out of 11 media outlets scored the bout for Barnatt.

==== 2015 ====
Strickland faced Santiago Ponzinibbio in a welterweight bout on February 22, 2015, at UFC Fight Night 61. Strickland lost the back and forth fight via unanimous decision.

As a part of his training for his fight with Ponzinibbio, Strickland took part in Josh Koscheck's fight camp in Fresno, California, for Koscheck's fight with Jake Ellenberger at UFC 184.

Strickland faced Igor Araújo on July 15, 2015, at UFC Fight Night 71. He won the fight by unanimous decision.

==== 2016 ====
Strickland faced Alex Garcia on February 21, 2016, at UFC Fight Night 83. After a back-and-forth first two rounds, Strickland won the fight via TKO in the third round.

Strickland next faced Tom Breese on June 4, 2016, at UFC 199. He won the fight via split decision.

Strickland was expected to face Tim Means on August 20, 2016, at UFC 202. However Strickland pulled out of the fight in early August citing a knee injury. He was replaced by promotional newcomer Sabah Homasi.

==== 2017 ====
Strickland faced Kamaru Usman on April 8, 2017, at UFC 210. He lost the fight via unanimous decision.

Strickland faced Court McGee on November 11, 2017, at UFC Fight Night 120. This fight was back and forth for all three rounds and was initially announced a majority draw with scores of 30-27, 29-29, and 29-29. After the fight it was revealed there was an error in calculating the judges' scorecards and Strickland was declared the winner by unanimous decision.

==== 2018 ====
Strickland faced Elizeu Zaleski dos Santos on May 12, 2018, at UFC 224. He lost the fight via knockout in the first round.

Strickland faced Nordine Taleb on October 27, 2018, at UFC Fight Night 138. He won the fight via technical knockout in the second round. Strickland became a free agent after the fight by fighting out his contract.

==== 2020 ====
Returning from a two-year hiatus after a motorcycle accident, Strickland was scheduled to face Wellington Turman on October 31, 2020, at UFC Fight Night 181. However on September 29, Turman pulled out due to COVID-19 sequelae that rendered him unable to train after his two-week quarantine ended on September 2, and he was replaced by Jack Marshman. At the weight-ins, Marshman weighed in at 187.5 pounds, one and a half pounds over the middleweight non-title fight limit. The bout proceeded at catchweight and Marshman was fined 20% of his purse, which went to Strickland. Strickland won the fight via unanimous decision.

As a result of Ian Heinisch contracting COVID-19, Strickland replaced Heinisch on short notice and faced Brendan Allen on November 14, 2020 in a 195 lb catchweight bout, at UFC Fight Night: Felder vs. dos Anjos. He won the fight via technical knockout. This win earned him the Performance of the Night award.

==== 2021 ====
Strickland faced Krzysztof Jotko on May 1, 2021, at UFC on ESPN: Reyes vs. Procházka. He won the bout via unanimous decision.

Strickland was expected to face Uriah Hall on August 7, 2021, at UFC 265. However on June 4, 2021, the bout with Hall was moved to headline UFC on ESPN 28 on July 31, 2021. During his training camp in the build up to this fight, he got into a physical altercation with sparring partner Orlando Sanchez, who he accused of trying to injure him. Strickland defeated Hall via unanimous decision.

Strickland was scheduled to face former UFC Middleweight Champion Luke Rockhold on November 6, 2021, at UFC 268. However, on October 11, Rockhold withdrew due to a herniated disc.

==== 2022 ====
Strickland faced Jack Hermansson on February 5, 2022, at UFC Fight Night 200. He won the fight via split decision. 21 out of 21 media outlets scored the fight for Strickland. Judge Sal D'Amato, who scored the fight 48-47 for Hermansson, received widespread criticism for his scorecard.

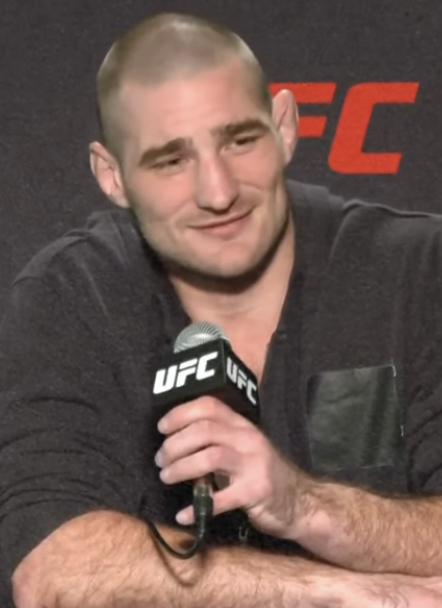
Strickland at a 2022 press conference

Strickland was scheduled to face Alex Pereira on July 30, 2022, at UFC 277. However, the promotion moved the pairing to UFC 276 on July 2, 2022. Strickland lost the fight via knockout in the first round.

Strickland was scheduled to face Jared Cannonier on October 15, 2022, at UFC Fight Night 212. However, the bout was scrapped after Strickland withdrew due to a finger infection. The pair was re-booked for UFC Fight Night 216 on December 17, 2022. Strickland lost the fight via split decision.

==== 2023 ====
In a quick turnaround, Strickland faced Nassourdine Imavov, replacing Kelvin Gastelum in a light heavyweight bout on January 14, 2023, at UFC Fight Night: Strickland vs. Imavov. He won the fight via unanimous decision.

Strickland faced Abusupiyan Magomedov on July 1, 2023 at UFC on ESPN 48. Strickland won the fight via TKO in the second round. This win earned him the Performance of the Night award.

=== UFC Middleweight Championship ===
Strickland faced Israel Adesanya for the UFC Middleweight Championship on September 10, 2023, at UFC 293. He won the fight via unanimous decision in what was considered a major upset, as Adesanya was a 7/1 betting favorite. The win also earned Strickland his third Performance of the Night bonus award.

==== 2024 ====
Strickland had his first title defense against Dricus du Plessis on January 20, 2024 at UFC 297. The pair were in attendance at UFC 296 on December 16, 2023, seated within two rows of each-other by Dana White's arrangement. While exchanging words, Strickland gestured for audience members to move and attacked du Plessis. The brawl was quickly broken up and Strickland was escorted out of the event. Strickland lost the fight via split decision. 13 out of 24 media outlets scored the bout for du Plessis. This fight earned him the Fight of the Night award.

=== Post championship ===
Strickland faced Paulo Costa on June 1, 2024, at UFC 302. He won the fight by split decision. Twenty-four media outlets unanimously scored the fight in favor of Strickland.

==== 2025 ====
Strickland competed for the UFC Middleweight Championship in a rematch against the champion Dricus du Plessis on February 9, 2025, at UFC 312. He lost the fight by unanimous decision.

==== 2026 ====
Strickland faced former LFA Middleweight Champion Anthony Hernandez in the main event on February 21, 2026, at UFC Fight Night 267. He won the fight by technical knockout in the third round, ending Hernandez's eight‑fight win streak. This fight earned him a $100,000 Performance of the Night award.

=== Second title reign ===
Strickland faced UFC Middleweight Champion Khamzat Chimaev at UFC 328 on May 9, 2026. He won the title via split decision, handing Chimaev his first loss in mixed martial arts. 11 out of 24 media outlets scored the bout for Strickland.

Strickland was scheduled to defend his title in a rematch against Nassourdine Imavov on December 12, 2026 at UFC 335. However, the bout did not come to fruition due to a reported pay dispute between Strickland and the UFC.

== Fighting style ==
Fighting in a notably upright, orthodox stance, Strickland is distinguished for his defensive striking. In the UFC’s official Significant Strike Defense statistic, he has a 60.9% defense rate—the highest among active fighters in the middleweight division.

UFC commentator Joe Rogan stated regarding Strickland’s defense, “He spars more than anybody in the UFC and they put a mouthpiece that measures how many times you get hit. He gets hit less than anyone [and] he’s got phenomenal defense.”

Central to Strickland’s defensive approach is his incorporation of the Philly Shell guard, referring to the positioning of the lead hand on the lower torso and the back hand closer to the side of the face. This allows Strickland to fight defensively by using the shoulder roll as well as parrying strikes and actively checking kicks.

Offensively, Strickland prefers to utilize his boxing within his fights. Strickland applies pressure by constantly walking forwards and forcing his opponents into boxing range, in which he then applies jabs often in volume and followed by a right cross.

Strickland generally applies his wrestling defensively to great effect, with a high takedown defense statistic of 68%. Strickland may pursue top position to engage in powerful ground and pound.

== Personal life ==
Growing up, Strickland was exposed to neo-Nazi and white supremacist views by his grandfather; he later said that finding MMA helped him cope with these issues. In his adulthood, Strickland has been criticized for frequently employing slurs in his language.

Strickland is agnostic. According to SPORTbible, "[h]e has consistently sparked debates with remarks related to religion, race, gender, and sexual orientation, and is regarded as one of the most problematic figures in UFC history."

In December 2018, Strickland was hit by a car while he was riding a motorcycle in Los Angeles, rendering him unconscious. He suffered numerous injuries and needed a knee operation after the accident.

In October 2025, Strickland got married.

Strickland was previously an avid supporter of Donald Trump; however, in February 2025, Strickland questioned some of Trump's pro-Israel views and began wondering if it was a "mistake" re-electing him. On June 19, 2025, Strickland made a statement on Twitter, claiming that the alleged reason "Iran says death to [the United States]" is because of "how many countries we have bombed and invaded in the last 50 years?!" including past operations in Vietnam, Iraq, Afghanistan, and Syria.

=== Controversial comments ===
At the UFC 293 press conference in September 2023, Strickland "racially taunt[ed]" his opponent Israel Adesanya, who responded by calling him a "neo-Nazi". In November 2024, Strickland said that Chinese people were "animals" who were "loud and dirty like savages".

Ahead of UFC 312 in February 2025, Strickland went on an extensive racist tirade, including a reference to "dirty Palestinians" who should "bend the fucking knee" before the country is "turned into rubble" in the context of the Gaza genocide. Palestinian-American fighter Belal Muhammad, then-UFC Welterweight Champion, called him a "racist little clown".

In October 2025, Strickland used a racial slur while on a live stream with content creator Nina Drama. In February 2026, ahead of his bout with Anthony Hernandez at UFC Fight Night 267, Strickland posted an AI-generated image depicting himself in a U.S. Immigration and Customs Enforcement (ICE) uniform and Hernandez in a sombrero and poncho.

In January 2026, Strickland said he loves Australia because "everyone's all happy and white". He explained his belief in racial hierarchies, classifying Filipino and Thai people as "jungle tier" Asians and referring to Australians as the "white trash of the white folks", while berating Robert Whittaker for "getting beat by the fucking jungle people".

In April 2026, ahead of his bout with Khamzat Chimaev at UFC 328, Strickland called his opponent a "terrorist". He added: "If you come up to me with three fucking goat fucker Chechnyans that don't speak English, I'm going to pull my gun and I'm going to shoot each and every one of you."

In May 2026, Strickland repeatedly used a racial slur while providing commentary at Brand Risk 14, an amateur MMA event organized by Adin Ross, before calling out "a real sensitive black man" who took issue with it. He subsequently commented on Jewish people while alluding to Adolf Hitler.

In early June 2026, Strickland posted an apology video to social media, claiming he had been banned from participating in UFC Freedom 250. This claim and subsequent apology came shortly after Strickland made multiple social media posts relating to Israeli geopolitics. Despite the video's framing, Strickland further criticized US military spending and Donald Trump's polling numbers. He concluded the video by stating he might still attend the event to publicly express his views regarding Trump and Israel.

=== Comments on LGBT issues and women's rights ===
In January 2022, Strickland responded to a question on Twitter, writing: "If I had a gay son I would think I failed as a man." During the press conference for UFC 297, Strickland responded to a reporter asking about his previous comments, as well as criticizing Canadian prime minister Justin Trudeau's handling of the Canada convoy protest and Bud Light's advertising campaign featuring transgender influencer Dylan Mulvaney.

On January 18, 2024 at UFC 297 media day, when a reporter mentioned Strickland's controversial tweet, Strickland responded:

You're part of the big problem, a spineless creature who asks me stupid questions. Just ten years ago, being trans meant you were mentally ill, but people like you suddenly decided to change everything. You are an infection, you are the definition of weakness—everything wrong that happens to this world is because of you. The good thing is that the world didn't buy into this—it didn't buy into this nonsense and the agenda that you are pushing. There are two genders, and I don't want my children to be taught in school what their preferences should be. This guy is the fucking enemy! Look at the enemy of our world—here he is, sitting right here and asking his stupid questions.

Strickland has made a number of controversial comments about women and women's rights, one of which was calling the decision to grant women the right to vote an error. He has also commented negatively about women's MMA. In an interview, he said "Sure, have women's MMA, have it be a thing. I don't like to watch it. I don't think most people like to watch it. If the female MMA was to separate from the male MMA no-one's going to watch that shit".

Strickland reiterated these views in February 2026, stating that "no one gives a fuck about women's sports", before adding: "There's nothing wrong with women. They do great things. They cook, they clean." He asserted that "too much" empowerment of women has "ruined society".

Strickland was a harsh critic of the 2026 Super Bowl halftime show, calling its headliner, Puerto Rican rapper Bad Bunny, a "fucking faggot" and "a gay foreigner who doesn't speak fucking English".

=== Suspension at Tuff-N-Uff event ===
Sean Strickland was indefinitely suspended by the Nevada State Athletic Commission (NSAC) on July 3, 2025. This decision extends a temporary suspension he received after a melee at a Tuff-N-Uff event on June 29, 2025. The altercation occurred immediately after a bout where Luis Hernandez defeated Miles Hunsinger by guillotine choke. Following his win, Hernandez reportedly taunted Hunsinger's coaches, including Strickland, with a "crotch chop", leading to Strickland's involvement in the physical altercation with Hernandez. On August 21, Strickland received a six-month suspension from the NSAC and was fined $5,000. The suspension was retroactive from the time of the incident and expired on December 29, 2025.

== Championships and accomplishments ==
- Ultimate Fighting Championship
  - UFC Middleweight Championship (Two times, current)
    - The second two-time UFC Middleweight Champion (after Israel Adesanya)
  - Fight of the Night (One time) vs. Dricus du Plessis 1
  - Performance of the Night (Four times) vs. Brendan Allen, Abusupiyan Magomedov, Israel Adesanya and Anthony Hernandez
  - Most significant strikes landed in UFC Middleweight division history (1698)
    - Second most significant strikes landed in UFC history (2430)
    - Most total strikes landed in UFC Middleweight division history (1799)
    - Fourth most total strikes landed in UFC history (2627)
  - Fourth most strikes landed-per-minute in UFC Middleweight division history (6.2)
  - Longest average fight time in UFC Middleweight division history (18:15)
  - Fifth most total fight time in UFC Middleweight division history (4:33:52)
  - Tied (Gleison Tibau & Andre Fili) for most split decision wins in UFC history (5)
    - Tied (Gleison Tibau) for second most split decision bouts in UFC history (7) (behind Clay Guida)
    - Tied (Krzysztof Jotko & Brad Tavares) for most split decision wins in UFC Middleweight division history (3)
  - Tied (Chris Leben & Jean Silva) for third fastest turnaround to win two fights (14 days in 2020)
  - UFC Bout Records
    - Middleweight
      - Most significant strikes attempted (428) (vs. Uriah Hall)
      - Third most significant strikes attempted (400) (vs. Jared Cannonier)
      - Most significant strikes landed in a UFC Middleweight title bout (173) (vs. Dricus du Plessis 1)
      - Most significant head strikes landed (173) (vs. Uriah Hall)
    - Light Heavyweight
      - Most significant strikes attempted (405) (vs. Nassourdine Imavov)
      - Most total strikes attempted (420) (vs. Nassourdine Imavov)
  - UFC Honors Awards
    - 2023: President's Choice Performance of the Year Nominee vs. Israel Adesanya
  - UFC.com Awards
    - 2023: Ranked No. 4 Fighter of the Year & Ranked No. 2 Upset of the Year vs. Israel Adesanya
- King of the Cage
  - KOTC Middleweight Championship (One time)
    - Five successful title defenses
- The Sporting News
  - 2023 Men's Fighter of the Year
  - 2023 Upset of the Year vs. Israel Adesanya at UFC 293
- New York Post
  - 2023 Upset of the Year vs. Israel Adesanya at UFC 293
- MMA Junkie
  - 2020 Comeback Fighter of the Year
  - 2023 Male Fighter of the Year
- Sherdog
  - 2020 Comeback Fighter of the Year
- World MMA Awards
  - 2024 Upset of the Year vs. Israel Adesanya at UFC 293
- MMA Fighting
  - 2023 First Team MMA All-Star
- ESPN
  - 2023 Most Improved Fighter
- Fight Matrix
  - 2023 Most Improved Fighter of the Year
  - 2023 Most Lopsided Upset of the Year vs. Israel Adesanya at UFC 293
- LowKick MMA
  - 2023 Fighter of the Year
  - 2023 Upset of the Year vs. Israel Adesanya at UFC 293
- MMA Mania
  - 2023 No. 4 Ranked Fighter of the Year
- Combat Press
  - 2023 Male Fighter of the Year
- Cageside Press
  - 2023 Male Fighter of the Year
  - 2023 Upset of the Year vs. Israel Adesanya at UFC 293

== Mixed martial arts record ==
Professional record breakdown
38 matches	31 wins	7 losses
By knockout	12	2
By submission	4	0
By decision	15	5

Res.	Record	Opponent	Method	Event	Date	Round	Time	Location	Notes
Win	31–7	Khamzat Chimaev	Decision (split)	UFC 328	May 9, 2026	5	5:00	Newark, New Jersey, United States	Won the UFC Middleweight Championship.
Win	30–7	Anthony Hernandez	TKO (punches)	UFC Fight Night: Strickland vs. Hernandez	February 21, 2026	3	2:23	Houston, Texas, United States	Performance of the Night.
Loss	29–7	Dricus du Plessis	Decision (unanimous)	UFC 312	February 9, 2025	5	5:00	Sydney, Australia	For the UFC Middleweight Championship.
Win	29–6	Paulo Costa	Decision (split)	UFC 302	June 1, 2024	5	5:00	Newark, New Jersey, United States	
Loss	28–6	Dricus du Plessis	Decision (split)	UFC 297	January 20, 2024	5	5:00	Toronto, Ontario, Canada	Lost the UFC Middleweight Championship. Fight of the Night.
Win	28–5	Israel Adesanya	Decision (unanimous)	UFC 293	September 10, 2023	5	5:00	Sydney, Australia	Won the UFC Middleweight Championship. Performance of the Night.
Win	27–5	Abusupiyan Magomedov	TKO (punches)	UFC on ESPN: Strickland vs. Magomedov	July 1, 2023	2	4:20	Las Vegas, Nevada, United States	Performance of the Night.
Win	26–5	Nassourdine Imavov	Decision (unanimous)	UFC Fight Night: Strickland vs. Imavov	January 14, 2023	5	5:00	Las Vegas, Nevada, United States	Light Heavyweight bout.
Loss	25–5	Jared Cannonier	Decision (split)	UFC Fight Night: Cannonier vs. Strickland	December 17, 2022	5	5:00	Las Vegas, Nevada, United States	
Loss	25–4	Alex Pereira	KO (punches)	UFC 276	July 2, 2022	1	2:36	Las Vegas, Nevada, United States	
Win	25–3	Jack Hermansson	Decision (split)	UFC Fight Night: Hermansson vs. Strickland	February 5, 2022	5	5:00	Las Vegas, Nevada, United States	
Win	24–3	Uriah Hall	Decision (unanimous)	UFC on ESPN: Hall vs. Strickland	July 31, 2021	5	5:00	Las Vegas, Nevada, United States	
Win	23–3	Krzysztof Jotko	Decision (unanimous)	UFC on ESPN: Reyes vs. Procházka	May 1, 2021	3	5:00	Las Vegas, Nevada, United States	
Win	22–3	Brendan Allen	TKO (punches)	UFC Fight Night: Felder vs. dos Anjos	November 14, 2020	2	1:32	Las Vegas, Nevada, United States	Catchweight (195 lb) bout. Performance of the Night.
Win	21–3	Jack Marshman	Decision (unanimous)	UFC Fight Night: Hall vs. Silva	October 31, 2020	3	5:00	Las Vegas, Nevada, United States	Return to Middleweight; Marshman missed weight (187.5 lb).
Win	20–3	Nordine Taleb	TKO (punches)	UFC Fight Night: Volkan vs. Smith	October 27, 2018	2	3:10	Moncton, New Brunswick, Canada	
Loss	19–3	Elizeu Zaleski dos Santos	KO (spinning wheel kick and punches)	UFC 224	May 12, 2018	1	3:40	Rio de Janeiro, Brazil	
Win	19–2	Court McGee	Decision (unanimous)	UFC Fight Night: Poirier vs. Pettis	November 11, 2017	3	5:00	Norfolk, Virginia, United States	Originally announced as a majority draw; overturned due to a miscalculation in scores.
Loss	18–2	Kamaru Usman	Decision (unanimous)	UFC 210	April 8, 2017	3	5:00	Buffalo, New York, United States	
Win	18–1	Tom Breese	Decision (split)	UFC 199	June 4, 2016	3	5:00	Inglewood, California, United States	
Win	17–1	Alex Garcia	KO (punches)	UFC Fight Night: Cowboy vs. Cowboy	February 21, 2016	3	4:25	Pittsburgh, Pennsylvania, United States	
Win	16–1	Igor Araújo	Decision (unanimous)	UFC Fight Night: Mir vs. Duffee	July 15, 2015	3	5:00	San Diego, California, United States	
Loss	15–1	Santiago Ponzinibbio	Decision (unanimous)	UFC Fight Night: Bigfoot vs. Mir	February 22, 2015	3	5:00	Porto Alegre, Brazil	Return to Welterweight.
Win	15–0	Luke Barnatt	Decision (split)	UFC Fight Night: Muñoz vs. Mousasi	May 31, 2014	3	5:00	Berlin, Germany	
Win	14–0	Bubba McDaniel	Submission (rear-naked choke)	UFC 171	March 15, 2014	1	4:33	Dallas, Texas, United States	
Win	13–0	Matt Lagler	TKO (punches)	KOTC: Split Decision	August 29, 2013	1	4:59	Highland, California, United States	Defended the KOTC Middleweight Championship.
Win	12–0	Yusuke Sakashita	Decision (unanimous)	KOTC: Worldwide	July 5, 2013	5	5:00	Manila, Philippines	Defended the KOTC Middleweight Championship.
Win	11–0	Bill Albrecht	KO (punch)	KOTC: Restitution	February 7, 2013	1	2:41	Los Angeles, California, United States	Defended the KOTC Middleweight Championship.
Win	10–0	Josh Bryant	Decision (split)	KOTC: Unification	December 8, 2012	3	5:00	Highland, California, United States	Defended and unified the KOTC Middleweight Championship.
Win	9–0	Brandon Hunt	TKO (punches)	KOTC: Hardcore	April 26, 2012	1	3:24	Highland, California, United States	Won the KOTC Middleweight Championship.
Win	8–0	Brandon Hunt	TKO (punches)	KOTC: Steel Curtain	December 17, 2011	1	3:48	Norman, Oklahoma, United States	
Win	7–0	Brett Sbardella	KO (punches)	KOTC: Demolition	August 6, 2011	1	1:03	Walker, Minnesota, United States	
Win	6–0	Donavin Hawkey	Submission (rear-naked choke)	KOTC: Platinum	November 25, 2010	1	1:21	Durban, South Africa	Return to Middleweight.
Win	5–0	Adriel Montes	TKO (punches)	KOTC: Underground 63	October 2, 2010	2	1:05	Laughlin, Nevada, United States	
Win	4–0	George Interiano	Decision (unanimous)	Long Beach Fight Night 7	January 3, 2010	3	5:00	Long Beach, California, United States	
Win	3–0	William Wheeler	Submission (rear-naked choke)	KOTC: Jolted	October 3, 2009	1	1:55	Laughlin, Nevada, United States	Light Heavyweight debut.
Win	2–0	Brandon Ellsworth	TKO (punches)	KOTC: Last Resort	March 14, 2009	1	1:28	Laughlin, Nevada, United States	Middleweight debut.
Win	1–0	Tyler Pottett	Submission (rear-naked choke)	KOTC: Protege	March 22, 2008	2	1:53	Laughlin, Nevada, United States	Welterweight debut.

== Pay-per-view bouts ==
No.	Event	Fight	Date	Venue	City	PPV buys
1.	UFC 293	Adesanya vs. Strickland	September 10, 2023	Qudos Bank Arena	Sydney, Australia	Not Disclosed
2.	UFC 297	Strickland vs. du Plessis	January 20, 2024	Scotiabank Arena	Toronto, Ontario, Canada	Not Disclosed
3.	UFC 312	du Plessis vs. Strickland 2	February 9, 2025	Qudos Bank Arena	Sydney, Australia	Not Disclosed

== See also ==
- List of current UFC fighters
- List of male mixed martial artists

Awards and achievements
Preceded by Israel Adesanya	14th UFC Middleweight Champion; September 10, 2023 – January 20, 2024	Succeeded by Dricus du Plessis
Preceded by Khamzat Chimaev	17th UFC Middleweight Champion; May 9, 2026 – present	Incumbent
