= Eryk Anders =

American mixed martial artist (born 1987)

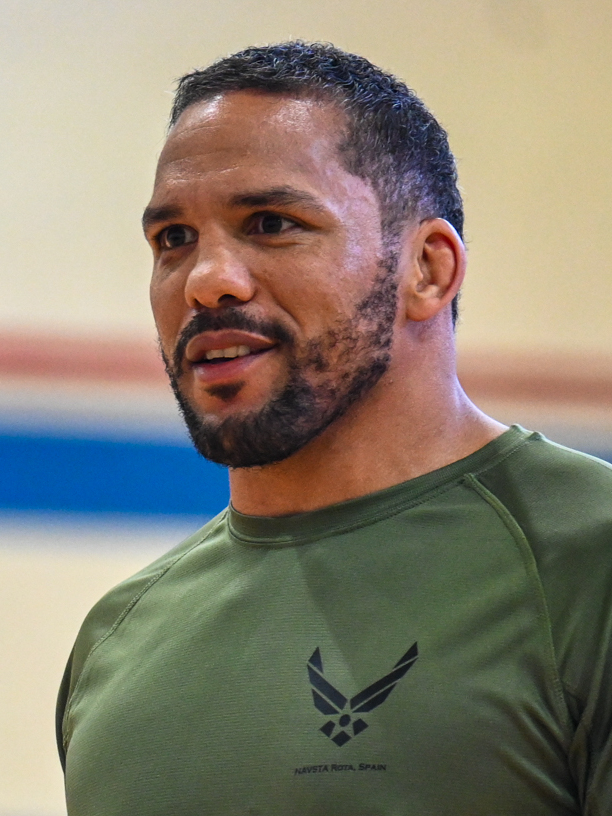
- Anders in 2024
- Born: April 21, 1987 (age 39); Clark Air Base, Pampanga, Luzon Islands, Philippines
- Other names: Ya Boi
- Nationality: American
- Height: 6 ft 1 in (185 cm)
- Weight: 193 lb (88 kg; 13 st 11 lb)
- Division: Middleweight (2015–2018, 2019–2026); Light Heavyweight (2018–2019)
- Reach: 75 in (191 cm)
- Style: Kickboxing, Brazilian Jiu-Jitsu
- Fighting out of: Birmingham, Alabama, U.S.
- Team: Spartan Fitness (formerly); Fight Ready MMA (2020–present)
- Rank: Black belt in Brazilian Jiu-Jitsu
- Years active: 2015–2026

Mixed martial arts record
- Total: 28
- Wins: 18
- By knockout: 10
- By submission: 1
- By decision: 7
- Losses: 9
- By knockout: 2
- By submission: 1
- By decision: 6
- No contests: 1

Other information
- University: University of Alabama
- Mixed martial arts record from Sherdog

Eryk Anders (born April 21, 1987) is an American former professional mixed martial artist and American football linebacker. He competed in the Middleweight division of the UFC. He played college football at the University of Alabama.

== Early life ==
Eryk Anders was born on a U.S. Air Force base in the Philippines, where his mother was stationed at the time. When Anders was a sophomore in high school he moved to San Antonio, Texas, where he played football for Smithson Valley High School.

== Football career ==
Eryk Anders
No. 94
- Position: Linebacker

Personal information
- Born: April 21, 1987 (age 39); Clark Air Base, Pampanga, Luzon Islands, Philippines
- Listed height: 6 ft 2 in (1.88 m)
- Listed weight: 235 lb (107 kg)

Career information
- High school: Smithson Valley High School (San Antonio, Texas)
- College: Alabama
- NFL draft: 2010: undrafted

Career history
- Cleveland Browns (2010)*; Calgary Stampeders (2010)*
- * Offseason or practice squad member only

Awards and highlights
- BCS National Championship (2010)

After graduating from Smithson Valley High School, Anders started at the University of Alabama in 2006. From 2006 to 2009, Anders played for the Crimson Tide as a linebacker, starting 14 games in his senior season. His career at Alabama culminated with a victory in the 2009 BCS National Championship against the Texas Longhorns, a game in which he led the Crimson Tide with seven tackles and a forced fumble.

After college he signed a contract with the Cleveland Browns of the NFL. He also had stints in the Canadian Football League and the Arena Football League before beginning a career in mixed martial arts.

During his MMA career, Anders kept in touch with football coach Nick Saban. Eryk valued having the coach as a life-coach, helping guide Anders through life's challenges, as well as being financially responsible.

== Mixed martial arts career ==
=== Early career ===
Anders began his mixed martial arts career in 2012 as an amateur, participating in 22 amateur bouts, although his official record is listed as 13-3-1 before his professional debut against Josh Rasberry on August 22, 2015, for Strike Hard Productions. He defeated Rasberry in just 40 seconds via TKO.

In his second professional fight, Anders defeated Demarcus Sharpe by unanimous decision.

Anders defeated Garrick James by TKO.

Anders next defeated Dekaire Sanders by submission via rear naked choke.

For his fifth professional fight he defeated Jesse Grun via TKO due to punches.

=== Bellator MMA ===
Anders made his Bellator debut on October 21, 2016, defeating Brian White by TKO in 23 seconds.

=== Legacy Fighting Alliance ===
Anders next joined Legacy Fighting Alliance. He defeated Jon Kirk by TKO at LFA 6 on March 10, 2017.

On June 23, 2017, Anders fought for the Legacy Fighting Alliance middleweight championship at LFA 14. He defeated Brendan Allen via unanimous decision to win the title.

=== Ultimate Fighting Championship ===
Anders made his UFC debut against Rafael Natal at UFC on Fox: Weidman vs. Gastelum, as a late replacement for Alessio Di Chirico who was forced to withdraw due to a neck injury. He won the fight via knockout in the first round.

Anders was expected to face John Phillips on December 9, 2017, at UFC Fight Night 123. However, Phillips was removed from the card and was replaced by promotional newcomer Markus Perez on December 9, 2017, at UFC Fight Night 123. Anders won the fight by unanimous decision.

Anders faced Lyoto Machida on February 3, 2018, at UFC Fight Night 125. He lost the fight via controversial split decision. 16 of 23 media outlets scored the fight for Anders.

Anders faced Tim Williams on August 25, 2018, at UFC Fight Night 135. He won the fight via knockout due to a head kick in the third round. This fight earned him the Performance of Night award.

Anders was tabbed as a short notice replacement for Jimi Manuwa, and faced Thiago Santos in a light heavyweight bout at UFC Fight Night 137. Anders lost via referee stoppage TKO when he collapsed and failed to make it to his corner at the conclusion of round three. This fight earned him the Fight of the Night award.

Making a quick turnaround to the Octagon, Anders returned to middleweight to replace Antônio Carlos Júnior in a bout against Elias Theodorou at UFC 231 on December 8, 2018. He lost the fight via split decision.

Anders faced Khalil Rountree Jr. on April 13, 2019, at UFC 236. He lost the fight via unanimous decision.

Anders faced Vinicius Moreira, replacing Roman Dolidze, on June 29, 2019, at UFC on ESPN 3. He won the fight via knockout in the first round. This fight earned him the Performance of the Night award.

Anders faced Gerald Meerschaert in a middleweight bout on October 12, 2019, at UFC Fight Night 161. He won the fight via split decision.

Anders was scheduled to face Krzysztof Jotko on April 11, 2020, at UFC Fight Night: Overeem vs. Harris. Due to the COVID-19 pandemic, the event was eventually postponed to May 16, 2020, at UFC on ESPN: Overeem vs. Harris. He lost the fight via unanimous decision.

Anders was scheduled to face Antônio Arroyo, replacing Andreas Michailidis, on November 14, 2020, at UFC Fight Night 183. Anders was cornering his teammate, Walt Harris on Fight Island in UFC 254 when he got the call to step in for Michailidis. At the weigh-ins, Anders weighed in at 187.5 pounds, one and a half pounds over the middleweight non-title fight limit. Anders eventually pulled out of the fight the next day as consequence of the weigh-cut and his bout was canceled.

Anders faced Darren Stewart on March 13, 2021, at UFC Fight Night 187. Due to an illegal knee thrown by Anders in round one, the fight was declared a no contest.

Anders faced Darren Stewart at light heavyweight in a rematch on June 12, 2021, at UFC 263. He won the fight via unanimous decision.

Anders was scheduled to face Roman Dolidze on November 13, 2021, at UFC Fight Night 197. However, Anders was pulled the event for undisclosed reasons, and he was replaced by Kyle Daukaus.

Anders faced André Muniz, replacing injured Dricus Du Plessis, on December 11, 2021, at UFC 269. He lost the fight via an armbar submission in the first round.

Anders faced Jun Yong Park on May 21, 2022, at UFC Fight Night 206. He lost the bout via split decision.

Anders faced Kyle Daukaus on December 3, 2022 at UFC on ESPN 42. He won the bout via TKO stoppage in the second round.

Anders faced Marc-André Barriault on June 10, 2023, at UFC 289. He lost the bout via unanimous decision. The bout won the Fight of the Night bonus award.

Anders faced Jamie Pickett on March 2, 2024, at UFC Fight Night 238. He won the fight by unanimous decision.

Anders was scheduled to face former UFC Middleweight Champion Chris Weidman on November 9, 2024 at UFC 309. However, Anders withdrew on the day of the event because of food poisoning the night before and the bout was scrapped. The bout was rescheduled for UFC 310 on December 7, 2024 in a 195 lb catchweight bout. He won the fight by technical knockout via ground punches at the end of the second round.

Anders faced Christian Leroy Duncan on August 9, 2025 at UFC on ESPN 72. He lost the fight via a technical knockout via spinning back elbow and ground and pound near the end of the first round.

Anders faced Brad Tavares on March 14, 2026, at UFC Fight Night 269. He won the fight by unanimous decision and subsequently retired from mixed martial arts competition.

== Professional grappling career ==
Anders competed against Kyle Daukaus at Fury Pro Grappling 8 on December 30, 2023. He won the match by decision.

Anders competed against Charles Radtke at Fury Pro Grappling 9 on April 4, 2024. Anders won the match by golden score in overtime.

Anders competed against Luke Fernandez at Fury Pro Grappling 10 on May 24, 2024. He lost the match by golden score in overtime.

== Personal life ==
Anders is married with two sons.

== Entertainment career ==
In 2022, Anders made his acting debut as the MMA fighter Vicente "The Wolf" Gonzales in the second episode of season 5 of the Netflix series Cobra Kai.

== Championships and accomplishments ==
=== Mixed martial arts ===
- Ultimate Fighting Championship
  - Performance of the Night (Two times) vs. Tim Williams and Vinicius Moreira
  - Fight of the Night (Two times) vs. Thiago Santos and Marc-André Barriault
  - UFC.com Awards
    - 2017: Ranked #8 Newcomer of the Year & Ranked #4 Upset of the Year vs. Rafael Natal
- MMAjunkie.com
  - 2017 Under-the-Radar Fighter of the Year
- Legacy Fighting Alliance
  - LFA Middleweight Championship (One time)

=== Football ===
- National Collegiate Athletic Association
  - BCS National Championship (2009)

== Mixed martial arts record ==
Professional record breakdown
28 matches	18 wins	9 losses
By knockout	10	2
By submission	1	1
By decision	7	6
No contests	1	

Res.	Record	Opponent	Method	Event	Date	Round	Time	Location	Notes
Win	18–9 (1)	Brad Tavares	Decision (unanimous)	UFC Fight Night: Emmett vs. Vallejos	March 14, 2026	3	5:00	Las Vegas, Nevada, United States	
Loss	17–9 (1)	Christian Leroy Duncan	KO (spinning back elbow and punches)	UFC on ESPN: Dolidze vs. Hernandez	August 9, 2025	1	3:53	Las Vegas, Nevada, United States	
Win	17–8 (1)	Chris Weidman	TKO (punches)	UFC 310	December 7, 2024	2	4:50	Las Vegas, Nevada, United States	Catchweight (195 lb) bout.
Win	16–8 (1)	Jamie Pickett	Decision (unanimous)	UFC Fight Night: Rozenstruik vs. Gaziev	March 2, 2024	3	5:00	Las Vegas, Nevada, United States	
Loss	15–8 (1)	Marc-André Barriault	Decision (unanimous)	UFC 289	June 10, 2023	3	5:00	Vancouver, British Columbia, Canada	Fight of the Night.
Win	15–7 (1)	Kyle Daukaus	TKO (punches)	UFC on ESPN: Thompson vs. Holland	December 3, 2022	2	2:45	Orlando, Florida, United States	
Loss	14–7 (1)	Park Jun-yong	Decision (split)	UFC Fight Night: Holm vs. Vieira	May 21, 2022	3	5:00	Las Vegas, Nevada, United States	
Loss	14–6 (1)	André Muniz	Submission (armbar)	UFC 269	December 11, 2021	1	3:13	Las Vegas, Nevada, United States	
Win	14–5 (1)	Darren Stewart	Decision (unanimous)	UFC 263	June 12, 2021	3	5:00	Glendale, Arizona, United States	Light Heavyweight bout.
NC	13–5 (1)	Darren Stewart	NC (illegal knee)	UFC Fight Night: Edwards vs. Muhammad	March 13, 2021	1	4:37	Las Vegas, Nevada, United States	Anders landed an illegal knee to Stewart's head, who was a downed opponent.
Loss	13–5	Krzysztof Jotko	Decision (unanimous)	UFC on ESPN: Overeem vs. Harris	May 16, 2020	3	5:00	Jacksonville, Florida, United States	
Win	13–4	Gerald Meerschaert	Decision (split)	UFC Fight Night: Joanna vs. Waterson	October 12, 2019	3	5:00	Tampa, Florida, United States	Return to Middleweight.
Win	12–4	Vinicius Moreira	KO (punches)	UFC on ESPN: Ngannou vs. dos Santos	June 29, 2019	1	1:18	Minneapolis, Minnesota, United States	Performance of the Night.
Loss	11–4	Khalil Rountree Jr.	Decision (unanimous)	UFC 236	April 13, 2019	3	5:00	Atlanta, Georgia, United States	
Loss	11–3	Elias Theodorou	Decision (split)	UFC 231	December 8, 2018	3	5:00	Toronto, Ontario, Canada	Middleweight bout.
Loss	11–2	Thiago Santos	TKO (elbows)	UFC Fight Night: Santos vs. Anders	September 22, 2018	3	5:00	São Paulo, Brazil	Light Heavyweight debut. Fight of the Night.
Win	11–1	Tim Williams	KO (soccer kick)	UFC Fight Night: Gaethje vs. Vick	August 25, 2018	3	4:42	Lincoln, Nebraska, United States	Performance of the Night.
Loss	10–1	Lyoto Machida	Decision (split)	UFC Fight Night: Machida vs. Anders	February 3, 2018	5	5:00	Belém, Brazil	
Win	10–0	Markus Perez	Decision (unanimous)	UFC Fight Night: Swanson vs. Ortega	December 9, 2017	3	5:00	Fresno, California, United States	
Win	9–0	Rafael Natal	KO (punches)	UFC on Fox: Weidman vs. Gastelum	July 22, 2017	1	2:54	Uniondale, New York, United States	
Win	8–0	Brendan Allen	Decision (unanimous)	LFA 14	June 23, 2017	5	5:00	Houston, Texas, United States	Won the inaugural LFA Middleweight Championship.
Win	7–0	Jon Kirk	TKO (punches)	LFA 6	March 10, 2017	1	1:35	San Antonio, Texas, United States	Catchweight (190 lb) bout.
Win	6–0	Brian White	TKO (punches)	Bellator 162	October 21, 2016	1	0:23	Memphis, Tennessee, United States	
Win	5–0	Jesse Grun	TKO (punches)	Valor Fights 37	August 27, 2016	1	3:18	Cleveland, Tennessee, United States	
Win	4–0	Dekaire Sanders	Submission (rear-naked choke)	V3 Fights: Sanders vs. Anders	June 18, 2016	1	0:33	Memphis, Tennessee, United States	
Win	3–0	Garrick James	TKO (punches)	Strike Hard Productions 42	May 14, 2016	3	4:07	Tuscaloosa, Alabama, United States	
Win	2–0	Demarcus Sharpe	Decision (unanimous)	SFC: Southern Explosion	October 20, 2015	3	5:00	Montgomery, Alabama, United States	
Win	1–0	Josh Rasberry	TKO (punches)	Strike Hard Productions 40	August 22, 2015	1	0:40	Tuscaloosa, Alabama, United States	Middleweight debut.
