= UFC 279 =

Mixed martial arts event in 2022

UFC 279: Diaz vs. Ferguson
- The poster for UFC 279: Diaz vs. Ferguson
- Promotion: Ultimate Fighting Championship
- Date: September 10, 2022
- Venue: T-Mobile Arena
- City: Paradise, Nevada, United States
- Attendance: 19,125
- Total gate: $5,670,271.86

Event chronology
UFC Fight Night: Gane vs. Tuivasa	UFC 279: Diaz vs. Ferguson	UFC Fight Night: Sandhagen vs. Song

UFC 279: Diaz vs. Ferguson was a mixed martial arts event produced by the Ultimate Fighting Championship that took place on September 10, 2022, at the T-Mobile Arena in Paradise, Nevada, part of the Las Vegas Metropolitan Area, United States.

== Background ==
The promotion originally targeted a UFC Bantamweight Championship bout between former champion Aljamain Sterling and former two-time champion T.J. Dillashaw as the main event, but opted to change plans and move it to UFC 280.

Originally, a welterweight bout headlining Khamzat Chimaev against Nate Diaz, former lightweight title challenger and winner of The Ultimate Fighter 5, was set for the event. However, Chimaev weighed in at 178.5 pounds, exceeding the non-title welterweight limit by 7.5 pounds, leading to the bout's cancellation.

In response to this, the UFC made several changes:

1. Nate Diaz was matched with Tony Ferguson, the former interim UFC Lightweight Champion and winner of The Ultimate Fighter: Team Lesnar vs. Team dos Santos. Ferguson had been set to face Li Jingliang in a welterweight bout.
2. Chimaev was paired with Kevin Holland, who was initially scheduled to fight Daniel Rodriguez at a catchweight of 180 pounds. Their new bout would extend to five rounds, and Chimaev wasn't fined due to this new arrangement.
3. As a result of the shuffle, Rodriguez and Jingliang were set to compete at a catchweight of 180 pounds.

A trio of bouts was originally scheduled for this date, but they were eventually pushed back a week to UFC Fight Night: Sandhagen vs. Song as the promotion adjusted its schedule in June: lightweight bouts featuring Trey Ogden vs. Daniel Zellhuber and Nikolas Motta vs. Cameron VanCamp; as well as a welterweight bout between Louis Cosce and Trevin Giles.

A women's strawweight bout between Hannah Cifers and Melissa Martinez was expected to take place at the event. However, Cifers pulled out due to undisclosed reasons and was replaced by Elise Reed.

A middleweight bout between Jamie Pickett and Denis Tiuliulin was expected to take place at UFC on ESPN: dos Anjos vs. Fiziev, but it was moved to this card due to Tiuliulin suffering an injury during the week of the fight.

A heavyweight bout between Shamil Abdurakhimov and Jailton Almeida was expected to take place at the event. However, Abdurakhimov was forced to withdraw due to visa issues and was replaced by Anton Turkalj at a catchweight of 220 pounds.

While the organization typically conducts a pre-fight press conference two days ahead of numbered events, this session was interrupted and cut short. Fighters from the final three bouts were scheduled to attend, but after an extended wait, UFC President Dana White showed up only with Holland and Rodriguez. He announced that fighters would be brought in pairs, but cancelled the press-conference after their participation instead for "everybody's safety". He later revealed that an altercation involving four fighters and their teams took place backstage. It initiated with Chimaev and Holland, with Diaz eventually getting involved. The Nevada Athletic Commission (NAC) is expected to investigate the incident and potentially discipline all licensees.

In addition to Chimaev missing weight, featherweight Hakeem Dawodu and heavyweight Chris Barnett both missed weight as well. Dawodu weighed at 149.5 pounds, 3.5 pounds over the non-title featherweight limit, while Barnett weighed in at 267.5 pounds, 1.5 pounds over the non-title heavyweight limit. Both bouts proceeded at catchweight with Dawodu and Barnett each fined 30% and 20% of their purses, which went to their opponents Julian Erosa and Jake Collier respectively. A women's bantamweight bout between Irene Aldana and The Ultimate Fighter: Heavy Hitters women's featherweight winner Macy Chiasson was also changed to a 140-pound catchweight bout, but it was not due to a weight miss.

== Results ==
Main card
Weight class				Method	Round	Time	Notes
Welterweight	Nate Diaz	def.	Tony Ferguson	Submission (guillotine choke)	4	2:52
Catchweight (180 lb)	Khamzat Chimaev	def.	Kevin Holland	Submission (brabo choke)	1	2:13
Catchweight (180 lb)	Daniel Rodriguez	def.	Li Jingliang	Decision (split) (29–28, 28–29, 29–28)	3	5:00
Catchweight (140 lb)	Irene Aldana	def.	Macy Chiasson	KO (upkick to the body)	3	2:21
Light Heavyweight	Johnny Walker	def.	Ion Cuțelaba	Submission (rear-naked choke)	1	4:37
Preliminary card (ESPN / ESPN+)
Catchweight (149.5 lb)	Julian Erosa	def.	Hakeem Dawodu	Decision (unanimous) (30–27, 30–27, 30–27)	3	5:00
Catchweight (220 lb)	Jailton Almeida	def.	Anton Turkalj	Submission (rear-naked choke)	1	4:27
Middleweight	Denis Tiuliulin	def.	Jamie Pickett	TKO (knee and punches)	2	4:52	(Note: Tiuliulin was deducted 1 point in round 2 due to a groin strike.)
Catchweight (267.5 lb)	Chris Barnett	def.	Jake Collier	TKO (punches)	2	2:24
Early preliminary card (ESPN / ESPN+ / UFC Fight Pass)
Women's Featherweight	Norma Dumont	def.	Danyelle Wolf	Decision (unanimous) (30–27, 30–27, 30–26)	3	5:00
Bantamweight	Alateng Heili	def.	Chad Anheliger	Decision (unanimous) (30–27, 30–27, 30–27)	3	5:00
Women's Strawweight	Elise Reed	def.	Melissa Martinez	Decision (unanimous) (29–28, 29–28, 29–28)	3	5:00
Welterweight	Yohan Lainesse	def.	Darian Weeks	Decision (split) (29–28, 28–29, 29–28)	3	5:00

== Bonus awards ==
The following fighters received $50,000 bonuses.

- Fight of the Night: No bonus awarded.
- Performance of the Night: Nate Diaz, Irene Aldana, Johnny Walker, and Jailton Almeida

== See also ==
- List of UFC events
- List of current UFC fighters
- 2022 in UFC
