= Jamie Pickett =

American mixed martial arts fighter

- Born: August 29, 1988 (age 38); Jacksonville, North Carolina, U.S.
- Other names: The Nightwolf
- Height: 6 ft 1 in (185 cm)
- Weight: 185 lb (84 kg; 13 st 3 lb)
- Division: Light Heavyweight; Middleweight
- Reach: 80 in (203 cm)
- Fighting out of: Wilmington, North Carolina, U.S.
- Team: The Hit Pit MMA; Port City Sports Performance
- Rank: Brown belt in Brazilian Jiu-Jitsu under John Salter
- Years active: 2011–2024

Mixed martial arts record
- Total: 24
- Wins: 13
- By knockout: 9
- By decision: 4
- Losses: 11
- By knockout: 2
- By submission: 4
- By decision: 5

Other information
- Mixed martial arts record from Sherdog

Jamie Pickett (born August 29, 1988) is an American retired mixed martial artist who competed in the Middleweight division of the Ultimate Fighting Championship.

== Background ==
Pickett lived with his grandparents growing up in Chinquapin, North Carolina, due to his father being in prison and his mom, a drug user, leaving the family when he was young. His mother returned for Pickett and his two half brothers when he was eight, however she was still using drugs.

The government eventually got involved, and after a battle in court, Pickett ended up living with his father's parents, while his two half-brothers lived with his mom's parents, beginning at the age of nine or ten.

He ended up dropping out of high school at East Duplin High School in Beulaville, North Carolina. Pickett initially started training Brazilian jiu-jitsu at the age of 19 and dabbled into mixed martial arts in 2009.

== Mixed martial arts career ==
=== Early career ===
Pickett competed as an amateur from 2008 until 2011, compiling a record of 7-3. Making his professional debut at Conflick Cage Fighting against Tyler Minton, Pickett lost the bout via unanimous decision. Pickett then defeated Brian McGinnis via TKO in the first round at Charity Fight Round 1, followed by a loss to Joshua Williams via second-round rear-naked choke at Warfare 9: Apocalypse. Pickett defeated his next six opponents, with the first five coming by stoppages, culminating in Pickett defeating Rashawn Spencer via unanimous decision at Conflict MMA 42 Charlotte.

Pickett appeared in Dana White's Tuesday Night Contender Series Dana White's Contender Series 1 web-series program on July 11, 2017, facing Charles Byrd. He lost the fight via a technical submission in round one.

At the 864 Fighting Championship, Pickett defeated Crishian Torres via TKO in the first round. He defeated Elijah Gobille via TKO in round one at Next Level Fight Club 10.

Pickett was invited onto Dana White's Contender Series 17 on June 18, 2019, where he faced Punahele Soriano. He lost the bout via unanimous decision.

At NLFC 11 Pickett defeated Jacquis Williams via unanimous decision.

Headlining Dana White's Contender Series 30, he defeated Jhonven Pati via TKO in the second round, earning a UFC contract.

=== Ultimate Fighting Championship ===
In his promotional debut, Pickett faced Tafon Nchukwi at UFC Fight Night: Thompson vs. Neal on December 19, 2020. He lost the bout via unanimous decision.

Pickett faced Jordan Wright on May 15, 2021, at UFC 262. He lost the bout via TKO in the first round.

Pickett was scheduled to face Laureano Staropoli on October 9, 2021, at UFC Fight Night: Dern vs. Rodriguez. However, after one of his coaches tested positive for COVID-19, the bout was moved to October 23 at UFC Fight Night: Costa vs. Vettori. Pickett won the fight via unanimous decision.

Pickett was scheduled to face Caio Borralho on January 15, 2022, at UFC on ESPN 32. Borralho pulled out of the bout for unknown reasons and was replaced by promotional newcomer Joseph Holmes. Pickett won the fight via unanimous decision.

In a quick turn around, Pickett faced Kyle Daukaus, replacing Julian Marquez, on February 19, 2022, at UFC Fight Night 201. He lost the bout via D'Arce choke submission in the first round.

Pickett was scheduled to face Abdul Razak Alhassan on July 9, 2022, at UFC on ESPN 39. However, Alhassan pulled out of the bout and was replaced by Denis Tiuliulin. The bout was removed from the card for undisclosed reasons and moved to UFC 279. Pickett lost the fight via TKO in the second round.

Pickett was scheduled to face Bo Nickal on December 10, 2022, at UFC 282. However, it was announced in late October that Nickal withdrew due to injury and the bout was scrapped. The pair was rescheduled to meet on March 4, 2023, at UFC 285. He lost the fight via an arm-triangle choke submission in the first round. Following the fight, Pickett's manager announced plans to appeal the loss to NSAC due to Pickett suffering an alleged uncalled groin strike.

Pickett faced Josh Fremd on August 12, 2023, at UFC on ESPN: Luque vs. dos Anjos. At the weigh-ins, Fremd missed weight. Fremd weighed in at 189 pounds, four pounds over the middleweight non-title fight limit respectively. The bout proceeded at catchweight and Fremd was fined an undisclosed percentage of his purse, which went Pickett. Pickett lost the fight via unanimous decision.

Pickett faced Eryk Anders on March 2, 2024, at UFC Fight Night 238. It was stated by announcer Charly Arnolt prior to the fight that this was Pickett's final mixed martial artist bout and that he would retire afterwards. He lost the bout by unanimous decision leading to his fifth consecutive loss and announced his retirement.

== Championships and accomplishments ==
=== Mixed martial arts ===
- Next Level Fight Club
  - NLFC Middleweight Championship (One Time)
    - Two successful title defenses

== Mixed martial arts record ==
Professional record breakdown
24 matches	13 wins	11 losses
By knockout	9	2
By submission	0	4
By decision	4	5

Res.	Record	Opponent	Method	Event	Date	Round	Time	Location	Notes
Loss	13–11	Eryk Anders	Decision (unanimous)	UFC Fight Night: Rozenstruik vs. Gaziev	March 2, 2024	3	5:00	Las Vegas, Nevada, United States	
Loss	13–10	Josh Fremd	Decision (unanimous)	UFC on ESPN: Luque vs. dos Anjos	August 12, 2023	3	5:00	Las Vegas, Nevada, United States	Catchweight (189 lb) bout; Fremd missed weight.
Loss	13–9	Bo Nickal	Submission (arm-triangle choke)	UFC 285	March 4, 2023	1	2:54	Las Vegas, Nevada, United States	
Loss	13–8	Denis Tiuliulin	TKO (knees and punches)	UFC 279	September 10, 2022	2	4:52	Las Vegas, Nevada, United States	Tiuliulin was deducted one point in round 2 due to a groin strike.
Loss	13–7	Kyle Daukaus	Submission (brabo choke)	UFC Fight Night: Walker vs. Hill	February 19, 2022	1	4:59	Las Vegas, Nevada, United States	Catchweight (195 lb) bout.
Win	13–6	Joseph Holmes	Decision (unanimous)	UFC on ESPN: Kattar vs. Chikadze	January 15, 2022	3	5:00	Las Vegas, Nevada, United States	
Win	12–6	Laureano Staropoli	Decision (unanimous)	UFC Fight Night: Costa vs. Vettori	October 23, 2021	3	5:00	Las Vegas, Nevada, United States	
Loss	11–6	Jordan Wright	TKO (elbows and punches)	UFC 262	May 15, 2021	1	1:04	Houston, Texas, United States	
Loss	11–5	Tafon Nchukwi	Decision (unanimous)	UFC Fight Night: Thompson vs. Neal	December 19, 2020	3	5:00	Las Vegas, Nevada, United States	
Win	11–4	Jhonoven Pati	TKO (punches)	Dana White's Contender Series 30	August 25, 2020	2	0:33	Las Vegas, Nevada, United States	
Win	10–4	Jaquis Williams	Decision (unanimous)	Next Level Fight Club 11	September 28, 2019	3	5:00	Greenville, North Carolina, United States	Catchweight (211 lb) bout.
Loss	9–4	Punahele Soriano	Decision (unanimous)	Dana White's Contender Series 17	June 18, 2019	3	5:00	Las Vegas, Nevada, United States	
Win	9–3	Elijah Gbollie Jr.	TKO (punches)	Next Level Fight Club 10	February 2, 2019	1	4:32	Greenville, North Carolina, United States	Return to Middleweight.
Win	8–3	Cristhian Torres	TKO (doctor stoppage)	864 FC: Fight 4	May 26, 2018	1	3:03	Greenville, North Carolina, United States	Light Heavyweight debut.
Loss	7–3	Charles Byrd	Technical Submission (arm-triangle choke)	Dana White's Contender Series 1	July 11, 2017	1	4:55	Las Vegas, Nevada, United States	
Win	7–2	Rashaun Spencer	Decision (unanimous)	Conflict MMA 42	November 12, 2016	3	5:00	Indian Trail, North Carolina, United States	
Win	6–2	Doug Usher	KO (punch)	Legacy FC 47	October 16, 2015	2	2:32	Atlanta, Georgia, United States	
Win	5–2	Marcus Finch	TKO (punches)	Next Level Fight Club 3	September 19, 2015	3	4:41	Greenville, North Carolina, United States	Defended the NLFC Middleweight Championship.
Win	4–2	Savalas Williams	TKO (punches)	Next Level Fight Club 2	June 20, 2015	1	2:42	Greenville, North Carolina, United States	Defended the NLFC Middleweight Championship.
Win	3–2	Nick Poythress	TKO	Next Level Fight Club 1	February 28, 2015	2	1:16	Greenville, North Carolina, United States	Won the inaugural NLFC Middleweight Championship.
Win	2–2	Jason Fann	TKO (submission to punches)	Zed Mitchell MMA: The Truth Event	August 23, 2014	1	2:00	Greenville, North Carolina, United States	
Loss	1–2	Joshua Williams	Submission (rear-naked choke)	Warfare 9	June 21, 2013	2	1:59	North Myrtle Beach, South Carolina, United States	
Win	1–1	Brian McGinnis	TKO (doctor stoppage)	Charity Fight: Round 1	August 25, 2012	1	3:50	Kenansville, North Carolina, United States	
Loss	0–1	Tyler Minton	Decision (unanimous)	Triangle Promotions: Conflick Cage Fighting	September 24, 2011	3	5:00	Raleigh, North Carolina, United States	Middleweight debut.

== See also ==
- List of male mixed martial artists
