= Christian Leroy Duncan =

English mixed martial artist (born 1995)

- Born: July 24, 1995 (age 31); Gloucester, England
- Other names: CLD
- Height: 6 ft 2 in (1.88 m)
- Weight: 185 lb (84 kg; 13 st 3 lb)
- Division: Middleweight
- Reach: 79 in (201 cm)
- Fighting out of: Gloucester, England
- Team: Range Martial Arts Academy
- Years active: 2020–present

Mixed martial arts record
- Total: 18
- Wins: 15
- By knockout: 10
- By submission: 1
- By decision: 4
- Losses: 3
- By submission: 1
- By decision: 2

Other information
- Mixed martial arts record from Sherdog

Christian Leroy Duncan (born July 24, 1995) is an English mixed martial artist. He currently competes in the Middleweight division of the Ultimate Fighting Championship. He previously competed in Cage Warriors, where he is a former Cage Warriors Middleweight Champion. As of October 24, 2026, he is #12 in the Meta UFC middleweight rankings.

== Background ==
Duncan was born in Gloucester, Gloucestershire, England and has Afro-English heritage. Before found to MMA, Duncan was training hard in Basketball and had dreams of someday making it to the NBA. After finishing high school, Duncan dove into his MMA career, driven by a lifelong passion for the sport.

== Mixed martial arts career ==
=== Cage Warriors ===
In his MMA debut, Duncan faced Kyle McClurkin on September 26, 2020, at Cage Warriors 116. He won the fight via technical knockout in round two.

Duncan faced Lukasz Marcinkowski on December 12, 2020, at Cage Warriors 119. He won the fight via technical knockout in round one.

Duncan faced Will Currie on March 18, 2021, at Cage Warriors 120. He won the fight via technical knockout in round two.

The rematched with Currie took place on June 24, 2021, at Cage Warriors 123. He won the fight via unanimous decision.

Duncan was scheduled to face John-Martin Fraser on September 30, 2021, at Cage Warriors 127. However, the bout was moved to Cage Warriors 131 on December 10, 2021, for unknown reasons. In turn, Fraser pulled out and was replaced by Justin Moore. He won the fight via a rear-naked choke in round one.

==== Cage Warriors Middleweight Champion ====
Duncan faced Djati Mélan for the Cage Warriors Middleweight Championship on April 2, 2022, at Cage Warriors 136. He won the title via technical knockout in round three.

In his first title defense, Duncan faced Marian Dimitrov on November 12, 2022, at Cage Warriors 146. He defended his title via technical knockout in round one.

Duncan was scheduled to face UFC veteran Jesse Taylor on December 31, 2022, at Cage Warriors 148. However, the day before the event, Taylor was removed from the event after he was involved in a hit-and-run incident.

=== Ultimate Fighting Championship ===
After the bout with Taylor was cancelled, as the main card broadcast of Cage Warriors 148 got underway, Duncan revealed that he had been signed by the Ultimate Fighting Championship and prepare for his debut at UFC 286 in London.

In his promotional debut, Duncan faced Duško Todorović on March 18, 2023, at UFC 286. He won the fight via technical knockout after a knee injury rendered Todorović unable to continue in round one.

Duncan faced Armen Petrosyan on June 17, 2023, at UFC on ESPN 47. He lost the fight via unanimous decision.

Duncan was scheduled to face César Almeida on November 18, 2023, at UFC Fight Night 232. However, Almeida was pulled out from the event for medical reasons and was replaced by Denis Tiuliulin. He won the fight via technical knockout in round two.

Duncan faced Cláudio Ribeiro on March 2, 2024, at UFC Fight Night 238. He won the fight via technical knockout in round one.

Duncan was scheduled to face Robert Bryczek on July 27, 2024, at UFC 304. However, Bryczek withdrew from the fight for unknown reasons and was replaced by Gregory Rodrigues. He lost the fight via unanimous decision.

Duncan faced Andrey Pulyaev on March 22, 2025, at UFC Fight Night 255. He won the fight via unanimous decision.

Duncan faced Eryk Anders on August 9, 2025, at UFC on ESPN 72. He won the fight by knockout via spinning back elbow and ground and pound near the end of the first round. This fight earned him his first Performance of the Night award.

Duncan faced Marco Tulio on November 8, 2025, at UFC Fight Night 264. He won the fight via knockout in round two. This fight earned him another Performance of the Night award.

Duncan faced Roman Dolidze on March 21, 2026, at UFC Fight Night 270. He won the fight by unanimous decision.

Duncan faced Jared Cannonier on July 18, 2026 at UFC Fight Night 281. He won the fight by unanimous decision.

Duncan faced Brendan Allen in the main event on October 10, 2026, at UFC Fight Night 290. After having a point deducted for an eye poke, Duncan lost via rear-naked choke submission in the fifth round.

== Championships and accomplishments ==
- Ultimate Fighting Championship
  - Performance of the Night (Two times) vs. Eryk Anders and Marco Tulio
- Cage Warriors
  - Cage Warriors Middleweight Championship (One time)
    - One successful title defense
- Cageside Press
  - 2022 Middleweight Prospect of the Year
- MMA Fighting
  - 2025 Third Team MMA All-Star

== Mixed martial arts record ==
Professional record breakdown
18 matches	15 wins	3 losses
By knockout	10	0
By submission	1	1
By decision	4	2

Res.	Record	Opponent	Method	Event	Date	Round	Time	Location	Notes
Loss	15–3	Brendan Allen	Submission (rear-naked choke)	UFC Fight Night: Allen vs. Duncan	October 10, 2026	5	2:46	Las Vegas, Nevada, United States	Duncan was deducted one point in round 2 due to an eye poke.
Win	15–2	Jared Cannonier	Decision (unanimous)	UFC Fight Night: du Plessis vs. Usman	July 18, 2026	3	5:00	Oklahoma City, Oklahoma, United States	
Win	14–2	Roman Dolidze	Decision (unanimous)	UFC Fight Night: Evloev vs. Murphy	March 21, 2026	3	5:00	London, England	
Win	13–2	Marco Tulio	KO (spinning backfist and punches)	UFC Fight Night: Bonfim vs. Brown	November 8, 2025	2	3:28	Las Vegas, Nevada, United States	Performance of the Night.
Win	12–2	Eryk Anders	KO (spinning back elbow and punches)	UFC on ESPN: Dolidze vs. Hernandez	August 9, 2025	1	3:53	Las Vegas, Nevada, United States	Performance of the Night.
Win	11–2	Andrey Pulyaev	Decision (unanimous)	UFC Fight Night: Edwards vs. Brady	March 22, 2025	3	5:00	London, England	
Loss	10–2	Gregory Rodrigues	Decision (unanimous)	UFC 304	July 27, 2024	3	5:00	Manchester, England	
Win	10–1	Cláudio Ribeiro	TKO (elbows and punches)	UFC Fight Night: Rozenstruik vs. Gaziev	March 2, 2024	2	1:57	Las Vegas, Nevada, United States	
Win	9–1	Denis Tiuliulin	TKO (elbows and punches)	UFC Fight Night: Allen vs. Craig	November 18, 2023	2	4:24	Las Vegas, Nevada, United States	
Loss	8–1	Armen Petrosyan	Decision (unanimous)	UFC on ESPN: Vettori vs. Cannonier	June 17, 2023	3	5:00	Las Vegas, Nevada, United States	
Win	8–0	Duško Todorović	TKO (knee injury)	UFC 286	March 18, 2023	1	1:52	London, England	
Win	7–0	Marian Dimitrov	TKO (spinning back elbow and punches)	Cage Warriors 146	November 12, 2022	1	4:56	Manchester, England	Defended the Cage Warriors Middleweight Championship.
Win	6–0	Djati Mélan	TKO (flying knee and punches)	Cage Warriors 136	April 2, 2022	3	0:48	Manchester, England	Won the Cage Warriors Middleweight Championship.
Win	5–0	Justin Moore	Submission (rear-naked choke)	Cage Warriors 131	December 10, 2021	1	2:24	London, England	Catchweight (190 lb) bout.
Win	4–0	Will Currie	Decision (unanimous)	Cage Warriors 123	June 24, 2021	3	5:00	London, England	
Win	3–0	Will Currie	TKO (punches)	Cage Warriors 120	March 18, 2021	1	0:18	London, England	
Win	2–0	Łukasz Marcinkowski	TKO (spinning heel kick and punches)	Cage Warriors 119	December 12, 2020	1	1:00	London, England	
Win	1–0	Kyle McClurkin	TKO (punches)	Cage Warriors 116	September 6, 2020	2	0:12	Manchester, England	Middleweight debut.

== See also ==
- List of current UFC fighters
- List of male mixed martial artists

Awards and achievements
Preceded by Djati Mélan	12th Cage Warriors Middleweight Champion; Dec 10, 2021 – Dec 31, 2022; Vacated	Vacant Title next held by Mick Stanton
