= UFC on ESPN: Thompson vs. Holland =

Mixed martial arts event in 2022

- The poster for UFC on ESPN: Thompson vs. Holland
- Promotion: Ultimate Fighting Championship
- Date: December 3, 2022
- Venue: Amway Center
- City: Orlando, Florida, United States
- Attendance: 17,065

Event chronology
UFC Fight Night: Nzechukwu vs. Cuțelaba	UFC on ESPN: Thompson vs. Holland	UFC 282: Błachowicz vs. Ankalaev

UFC on ESPN: Thompson vs. Holland (also known as UFC on ESPN 42) was a mixed martial arts event produced by the Ultimate Fighting Championship that took place on December 3, 2022, at the Amway Center in Orlando, Florida, United States.

== Background ==
The promotion has previously contested three events at Kia Center in Orlando, most recently in February 2018 for UFC on Fox: Emmett vs. Stephens.

A welterweight bout between former UFC Welterweight Championship challenger Stephen Thompson and Kevin Holland headlined the event.

Yazmin Jauregui and Istela Nunes met in a women's strawweight bout. They were originally booked to fight at UFC on ESPN: Vera vs. Cruz four months earlier, but Nunes withdrew due to injury.

A middleweight bout between Jack Hermansson and Derek Brunson was expected to take place at the event. However, Brunson withdrew due to an undisclosed injury and was replaced by Roman Dolidze.

A women's flyweight bout between Tracy Cortez and Amanda Ribas was expected to take place at the event. However, shortly after the official weigh-ins, the promotion announced Cortez was pulled from the bout due to an unspecified medical issue and the bout was cancelled.

At the weigh-ins, Philip Rowe weighed in at 173.5 pounds, two and a half pounds over the welterweight non-title fight limit. His bout proceeded at catchweight and he was fined 30% of his purse, which went to his opponent Niko Price.

== Results ==
Main card (ESPN / ESPN+)
Weight class				Method	Round	Time	Notes
Welterweight	Stephen Thompson	def.	Kevin Holland	TKO (corner stoppage)	4	5:00
Welterweight	Rafael dos Anjos	def.	Bryan Barberena	Submission (neck crank)	2	3:20
Flyweight	Matheus Nicolau	def.	Matt Schnell	KO (punches)	2	1:44
Heavyweight	Sergei Pavlovich	def.	Tai Tuivasa	KO (punches)	1	0:54
Middleweight	Roman Dolidze	def.	Jack Hermansson	TKO (punches)	2	4:06
Middleweight	Eryk Anders	def.	Kyle Daukaus	TKO (punches)	2	2:45
Catchweight (173.5 lb)	Philip Rowe	def.	Niko Price	TKO (punches)	3	3:26
Preliminary card (ESPN / ESPN+)
Women's Strawweight	Angela Hill	def.	Emily Ducote	Decision (unanimous) (30–27, 30–27, 30–27)	3	5:00
Lightweight	Clay Guida	def.	Scott Holtzman	Decision (split) (28–29, 29–28, 29–28)	3	5:00
Lightweight	Michael Johnson	def.	Marc Diakiese	Decision (unanimous) (29–28, 29–28, 30–27)	3	5:00
Featherweight	Jonathan Pearce	def.	Darren Elkins	Decision (unanimous) (30–27, 30–27, 30–26)	3	5:00
Lightweight	Natan Levy	def.	Genaro Valdèz	Decision (unanimous) (29–28, 29–28, 30–27)	3	5:00
Featherweight	Francis Marshall	def.	Marcelo Rojo	KO (punches)	2	1:14
Women's Strawweight	Yazmin Jauregui	def.	Istela Nunes	TKO (punches)	2	4:06

== Bonus awards ==
The following fighters received $50,000 bonuses.

- Fight of the Night: Stephen Thompson vs. Kevin Holland
- Performance of the Night: Sergei Pavlovich and Roman Dolidze

== Aftermath ==
The event featured eight knockouts, equaling the UFC record for the most knockouts in a single event, a mark previously shared by seven other events. This record was surpassed on September 6, 2025, when UFC Fight Night: Imavov vs. Borralho recorded nine knockouts.

Also, former UFC Lightweight Champion Rafael dos Anjos became the first fighter in UFC history to cross eight hours of octagon time.

== See also ==
- List of UFC events
- List of current UFC fighters
- 2022 in UFC
