= Kevin Holland =

American mixed martial artist (born 1992)

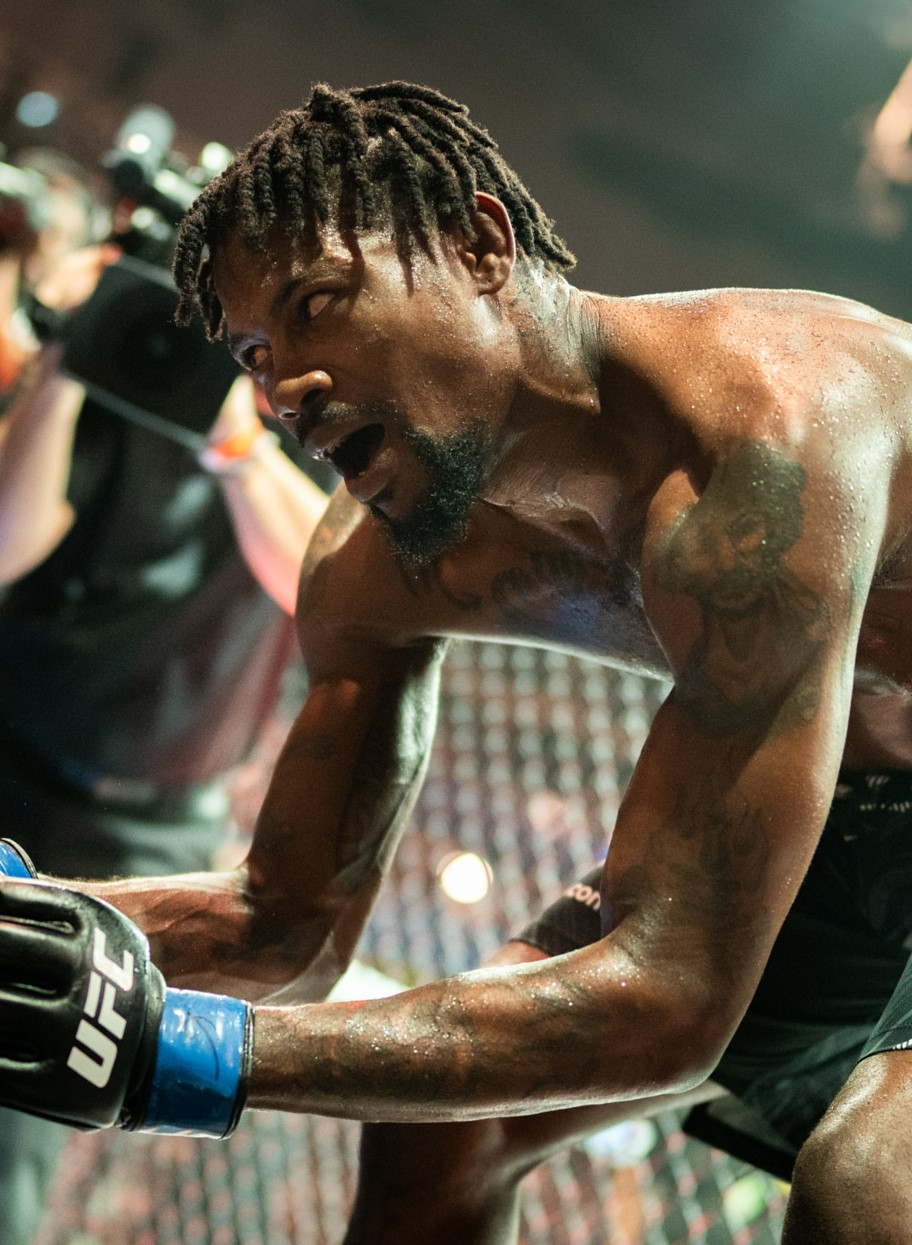
- Holland in 2025
- Born: Kevin Alan Holland; November 5, 1992 (age 34); Riverside, California, U.S.
- Nickname: Trailblazer
- Height: 6 ft 3 in (191 cm)
- Weight: 170 lb (77 kg; 12 st 2 lb)
- Division: Welterweight (2015–2016, 2022–present); Middleweight (2016–2021, 2024-present)
- Reach: 81 in (206 cm)
- Stance: Orthodox
- Fighting out of: Fort Worth, Texas, U.S.
- Team: Phalanx MMA Academy; Travis Lutter BJJ (2010–present)
- Rank: 2nd degree black belt in Kung Fu; Black belt in Brazilian Jiu-Jitsu under Travis Lutter
- Years active: 2015–present

Kickboxing record
- Total: 3
- Wins: 2
- By knockout: 2
- Losses: 1

Mixed martial arts record
- Total: 46
- Wins: 29
- By knockout: 14
- By submission: 9
- By decision: 6
- Losses: 15
- By knockout: 2
- By submission: 4
- By decision: 9
- Draws: 1
- No contests: 1

Amateur record
- Total: 5
- Wins: 5
- By knockout: 3
- By decision: 2

Other information
- Mixed martial arts record from Sherdog

Kevin Alan Holland (born November 5, 1992) is an American professional mixed martial artist and former kickboxer. He currently competes in the Welterweight and Middleweight divisions of the Ultimate Fighting Championship (UFC). A professional since 2015, Holland has also competed for Bellator MMA, King of the Cage and Legacy Fighting Alliance. As of November 14, 2026, he is #9 in the Meta UFC welterweight rankings.

== Background ==
Holland was born in Riverside, California, and raised mostly by his grandparents in Rancho Cucamonga and Ontario. His mother has been in and out of jail, meanwhile his father has been incarcerated throughout Holland's life. Holland attended Los Osos High School and Chaffey College. Holland started martial arts training when he was 16 years old and was a fan of Georges St-Pierre. He fell in love with the UFC after watching UFC 100, the first time he had watched the UFC, while visiting his father in Philadelphia.

== Mixed martial arts career ==
=== Early career ===
After compiling an amateur record of 5–0, Holland started his professional MMA career in 2015. He fought under various promotions such as Xtreme Knockout, Legacy Fighting Championship, King of the Cage, Bellator MMA, Legacy Fighting Alliance and amassed a record of 12–3 prior to his signing by the UFC.

=== Dana White's Contender Series ===
Holland appeared on Dana White's Contender Series season 2. He faced Will Santiago and won the fight via unanimous decision on June 12, 2018. Even with the win, Holland was not offered a contract on the show but he was brought in to face Thiago Santos at UFC 227.

=== Ultimate Fighting Championship ===
==== 2018 ====
Holland made his UFC debut on August 4, 2018, against Thiago Santos at UFC 227. He lost the fight via unanimous decision.

Holland's next fight came on November 24, 2018, at UFC Fight Night: Blaydes vs. Ngannou 2 against John Phillips. He won the fight via a submission due to a rear-naked choke in round three.

==== 2019 ====
Holland faced Gerald Meerschaert on March 30, 2019, at UFC on ESPN 2. He won the fight via split decision.

Holland faced Alessio Di Chirico on June 22, 2019, at UFC Fight Night 154. He won the fight via unanimous decision.

Holland was expected to face promotional newcomer Antônio Arroyo on November 16, 2019, at UFC Fight Night: Błachowicz vs. Jacaré. However, in late September, promotion officials elected to remove Holland from the bout in favor of a matchup against Brendan Allen on October 18, 2019, at UFC on ESPN 6. He lost the fight via submission in round two.

==== 2020 ====
Holland was expected to face Jack Marshman on March 21, 2020, at UFC Fight Night: Woodley vs. Edwards. However, on April 9, Dana White, the president of UFC announced that this event was postponed. Instead, Holland faced Anthony Hernandez on May 16, 2020, at UFC on ESPN: Overeem vs. Harris. He won the bout via a first round technical knockout.

Holland was scheduled to face Daniel Rodriguez on May 30, 2020, at UFC Fight Night: Woodley vs. Burns. However, On May 26, Holland was forced to withdraw from his scheduled bout with Rodriguez due to an injury and was replaced by promotional newcomer Gabriel Green.

Holland was expected to face Trevin Giles on August 1, 2020, at UFC Fight Night: Brunson vs. Shahbazyan. However, Giles fainted just prior to his walkout and the fight was canceled.

Holland faced promotional newcomer Joaquin Buckley on August 8, 2020, at UFC Fight Night 174. He won the fight via technical knockout in round three. This win earned him the Performance of the Night award.

Holland faced Darren Stewart on September 19, 2020, at UFC Fight Night 178. He won the fight via split decision.

Holland was scheduled to face Makhmud Muradov, replacing injured Krzysztof Jotko, on October 31, 2020, at UFC Fight Night 181. In turn, Muradov was removed from the fight due to testing positive for COVID-19 and was replaced by promotional newcomer Charlie Ontiveros. Holland won the fight in the first round when Ontiveros verbally submitted after suffering a neck injury due to a slam. This win earned him Performance Fight of the Night award.

Holland was scheduled to face Jack Hermansson at UFC on ESPN 19 on December 5, replacing an injured Darren Till. However, on November 28, it was announced that Holland was pulled from the bout due to testing positive for COVID-19.

Holland faced Ronaldo Souza on December 12, 2020, at UFC 256. He won the fight via knockout in the first round. This fight tied the record for the most UFC wins in a calendar year (5). This fight earned him the Performance of the Night award.

==== 2021 ====
Holland faced Derek Brunson on March 20, 2021, at UFC on ESPN 21. He lost the fight via unanimous decision.

Holland faced Marvin Vettori, replacing an injured Darren Till, on April 10, 2021, at UFC on ABC 2. With his second main event in three weeks, Holland tied the record for shortest turnaround between two main events. Though he managed to hurt Vettori with punches a few times, Holland was dominated on the ground for the majority of the fight and lost by unanimous decision. Subsequently – with one fight left on his prevailing contract – Holland signed a new, multi-fight deal with the UFC.

Holland faced Kyle Daukaus on October 2, 2021, at UFC Fight Night 193. Early in the bout a clash of heads occurred, resulting in Holland briefly being knocked unconscious. Though he continued to fight, Holland would be submitted via rear-naked choke moments later. Referee Dan Miragliotta reviewed the footage via replay and it was deemed the head clash led to the sequence of events resulting in Daukaus' win. Therefore, the fight was declared a no contest after the accidental head clash.

A rematch with Daukaus was scheduled on November 13, 2021, at UFC Fight Night 197. However, Holland withdrew from the bout due to injury.

==== 2022 ====
Holland returned to the Welterweight division for the first time since October 2017 to face Alex Oliveira on March 5, 2022, at UFC 272. He won the fight via technical knockout in round two. This win earned him the Performance of the Night award.

Holland faced Tim Means on June 18, 2022, at UFC on ESPN 37. He won the fight via D'Arce choke submission in round two. This win earned him his fifth Performance of the Night award.

Holland was scheduled to face Daniel Rodriguez in a 180-pound catchweight bout on September 10, 2022, at UFC 279. However, due to Khamzat Chimaev missing weight for his scheduled welterweight main event bout against Nate Diaz by nearly 10 pounds, the UFC was forced to remove Chimaev from the main event and change the card around. Holland was then scheduled to face Khamzat Chimaev at a 180-pound catchweight bout in the co-headliner instead, and the bout was scheduled for five rounds. Holland lost the fight via D’Arce choke submission in the first round.

Holland fought Stephen Thompson on December 3, 2022, at UFC on ESPN 42. He lost the fight by technical knockout after his corner stopped the fight after the fourth round. This fight earned him the Fight of the Night award. Holland suffered three broken metacarpals in his right hand during the fight which required surgery afterwards.

==== 2023 ====
Holland faced Santiago Ponzinibbio on April 8, 2023, at UFC 287. He won the bout via knockout in the third round.

Holland faced Michael Chiesa on July 29, 2023 at UFC 291. He won the fight via a D'arce choke submission in round one. The win earned Holland his sixth Performance of the Night bonus award.

Holland faced Jack Della Maddalena on September 16, 2023, at UFC Fight Night 227. He lost the fight via split decision. 16 out of 16 media outlets scored the bout for Maddalena.

==== 2024 ====
Holland faced promotional newcomer Michael Page on March 9, 2024, at UFC 299. He lost the bout by unanimous decision.

Holland faced Michał Oleksiejczuk in a middleweight bout on June 1, 2024, at UFC 302. After being knocked down, Holland was able to secure a victory by an armbar submission in the first round. This fight earned him another Performance of the Night award.

Holland was scheduled to face Chris Curtis on October 5, 2024 at UFC 307. However, Curtis withdrew from the fight due to a foot fracture and was replaced by Roman Dolidze. Holland lost the fight by technical knockout due to a corner stoppage as a result of a rib injury at the end of the first round.

==== 2025 ====
Holland faced former ONE Middleweight and Light Heavyweight Champion Reinier de Ridder on January 18, 2025, at UFC 311. He lost the fight via a rear-naked choke submission in the first round.

Holland faced Gunnar Nelson on March 22, 2025 at UFC Fight Night 255. He won the fight by 29-28 unanimous decision. This fight earned him another Performance of the Night award.

Holland faced Vicente Luque on June 7, 2025 at UFC 316. He won the fight by a D'Arce choke submission in the second round. This fight earned him another Performance of the Night award.

Holland faced Daniel Rodriguez on July 19, 2025 at UFC 318. He lost the fight by unanimous decision.

Holland faced Mike Malott on October 18, 2025 at UFC Fight Night 262. Despite taking a full five-minute timeout in the first round due to an inadvertent groin strike, Holland went on to lose the bout via unanimous decision.

==== 2026 ====
Holland was scheduled to face Geoff Neal in a rematch on February 21, 2026 at UFC Fight Night 267, following their first meeting in January 2017. However, for undisclosed reasons, Holland was removed from the card and replaced by Uroš Medić.

Holland faced Randy Brown on April 11, 2026 at UFC 327. He won the fight by unanimous decision.

Holland was scheduled to face Jacobe Smith on July 18, 2026, at UFC Fight Night 281. However, Holland had to withdraw due to an undisclosed injury.

Holland faced Uroš Medić on November 14, 2026 at UFC 334. After Medić was deducted a point for repeated groin strikes, the bout ended in a majority draw. 12 out of 12 media outlets scored the bout for Holland.

== Personal life ==
In October 2021, Holland stopped an alleged carjacker in his neighborhood. Per reports, Holland chased the man down, and subdued him until police arrived.

In March 2022, Holland said he and his training partner stopped a shooting at a Houston, Texas restaurant. The men heard a shot while at a restaurant and saw a man with a weapon who was being wrestled by a member of the public; after removing the gun from the shooter's hand, Holland said he subdued the man by placing him in a rear naked choke.

In May 2022, Holland revealed that he had rescued a driver from an overturned tractor-trailer. Holland had watched the driver speed up and lose control while joining the freeway, sliding off the embankment and flipping over. Holland got out of his car and got the man out from the truck, which was leaking fluid that Holland feared was going to cause an explosion.

== Championships and accomplishments ==
=== Mixed martial arts ===
- Ultimate Fighting Championship
  - Fight of the Night (One time) vs. Stephen Thompson
  - Performance of the Night (Nine times) vs Joaquin Buckley, Charlie Ontiveros, Ronaldo Souza, Alex Oliveira, Tim Means, Michael Chiesa, Michał Oleksiejczuk, Gunnar Nelson and Vicente Luque
    - Second most Performance of the Night bonuses in UFC history (9) (behind Charles Oliveira)
  - Tied (Roger Huerta & Neil Magny) for most wins in a calendar year in UFC history (5)
    - Fastest to win five UFC fights in a calendar year (210 days in 2020)
    - Tied (Neil Magny) for the only fighters in UFC history to have 5 bouts-per-calendar year twice (2020 & 2025)
  - Most wins in a calendar year in UFC Middleweight division history (5)
  - Most bouts in a 12-month period in UFC history (7) from May 2020 to April 2021
  - Tied (Brendan Allen) for most UFC wins among DWCS alumni (16)
  - UFC Honors Awards
    - 2020: President's Choice Performance of the Year Nominee vs. Ronaldo Souza & Fan's Choice Knockout of the Year Nominee vs. Ronaldo Souza
  - UFC.com Awards
    - 2020: Ranked #3 Fighter of the Year & Ranked #4 Knockout of the Year vs. Ronaldo Souza
    - 2022: Ranked #4 Fight of the Year vs. Stephen Thompson
- Xtreme Knockout
  - XKO Welterweight Championship
  - XKO Middleweight Championship
    - One successful title defense
- BT Sport
  - 2020 Male fighter of the year.
- Cageside Press
  - 2020 Male Fighter of the Year
- MMA Sucka
  - 2020 UFC Breakout Star of the Year
- MMA Junkie
  - 2020 December Knockout of the Month vs. Ronaldo Souza
  - 2020 Breakout Fighter of the Year
  - 2020 Male Fighter of the Year
  - 2022 December Fight of the Month vs. Stephen Thompson
- ESPN
  - 2020 Most Improved Fighter of the Year
- MMA Weekly
  - 2020 Breakout Fighter of the Year
- The Athletic
  - 2020 Breakthrough Fighter of the Year
- Sherdog
  - 2020 Breakthrough Fighter of the Year
- World MMA Awards
  - 2022 Fighting Spirit of the Year for bravery - in and out of the cage, helping his community in the face of danger on several occasions
- MMA Fighting
  - 2022 Second Team MMA All-Star
- CBS Sports
  - 2020 #3 Ranked UFC Knockout of the Year vs. Ronaldo Souza

=== Amateur titles ===
- Premiere Combat Group
  - PCG Welterweight Championship
- Belts of Honorious
  - BOH Welterweight Championship

== Mixed martial arts record ==
Professional record breakdown
46 matches	29 wins	15 losses
By knockout	14	2
By submission	9	4
By decision	6	9
Draws	1	
No contests	1	

Res.	Record	Opponent	Method	Event	Date	Round	Time	Location	Notes
Draw	29–15–1 (1)	Uroš Medić	Draw (majority)	UFC 334	November 14, 2026	3	5:00	New York City, New York, United States	Medić was deducted one point in round 2 due to repeated groin strikes.
Win	29–15 (1)	Randy Brown	Decision (unanimous)	UFC 327	April 11, 2026	3	5:00	Miami, Florida, United States	
Loss	28–15 (1)	Mike Malott	Decision (unanimous)	UFC Fight Night: de Ridder vs. Allen	October 18, 2025	3	5:00	Vancouver, British Columbia, Canada	
Loss	28–14 (1)	Daniel Rodriguez	Decision (unanimous)	UFC 318	July 19, 2025	3	5:00	New Orleans, Louisiana, United States	
Win	28–13 (1)	Vicente Luque	Submission (anaconda choke)	UFC 316	June 7, 2025	2	1:03	Newark, New Jersey, United States	Performance of the Night.
Win	27–13 (1)	Gunnar Nelson	Decision (unanimous)	UFC Fight Night: Edwards vs. Brady	March 22, 2025	3	5:00	London, England	Return to Welterweight. Performance of the Night.
Loss	26–13 (1)	Reinier de Ridder	Submission (rear-naked choke)	UFC 311	January 18, 2025	1	3:31	Inglewood, California, United States	
Loss	26–12 (1)	Roman Dolidze	TKO (corner stoppage)	UFC 307	October 5, 2024	1	5:00	Salt Lake City, Utah, United States	
Win	26–11 (1)	Michał Oleksiejczuk	Technical Submission (armbar)	UFC 302	June 1, 2024	1	1:34	Newark, New Jersey, United States	Return to Middleweight. Performance of the Night.
Loss	25–11 (1)	Michael Page	Decision (unanimous)	UFC 299	March 9, 2024	3	5:00	Miami, Florida, United States	
Loss	25–10 (1)	Jack Della Maddalena	Decision (split)	UFC Fight Night: Grasso vs. Shevchenko 2	September 16, 2023	3	5:00	Las Vegas, Nevada, United States	
Win	25–9 (1)	Michael Chiesa	Submission (brabo choke)	UFC 291	July 29, 2023	1	2:39	Salt Lake City, Utah, United States	Performance of the Night.
Win	24–9 (1)	Santiago Ponzinibbio	KO (punch)	UFC 287	April 8, 2023	3	3:16	Miami, Florida, United States	
Loss	23–9 (1)	Stephen Thompson	TKO (corner stoppage)	UFC on ESPN: Thompson vs. Holland	December 3, 2022	4	5:00	Orlando, Florida, United States	Fight of the Night.
Loss	23–8 (1)	Khamzat Chimaev	Submission (brabo choke)	UFC 279	September 10, 2022	1	2:13	Las Vegas, Nevada, United States	Catchweight (180 lb) bout.
Win	23–7 (1)	Tim Means	Submission (brabo choke)	UFC on ESPN: Kattar vs. Emmett	June 18, 2022	2	1:28	Austin, Texas, United States	Performance of the Night.
Win	22–7 (1)	Alex Oliveira	TKO (elbows)	UFC 272	March 5, 2022	2	0:38	Las Vegas, Nevada, United States	Return to Welterweight. Performance of the Night.
NC	21–7 (1)	Kyle Daukaus	NC (accidental clash of heads)	UFC Fight Night: Santos vs. Walker	October 2, 2021	1	3:43	Las Vegas, Nevada, United States	Accidental clash of heads knocked Holland unconscious.
Loss	21–7	Marvin Vettori	Decision (unanimous)	UFC on ABC: Vettori vs. Holland	April 10, 2021	5	5:00	Las Vegas, Nevada, United States	
Loss	21–6	Derek Brunson	Decision (unanimous)	UFC on ESPN: Brunson vs. Holland	March 20, 2021	5	5:00	Las Vegas, Nevada, United States	
Win	21–5	Ronaldo Souza	KO (punches)	UFC 256	December 12, 2020	1	1:45	Las Vegas, Nevada, United States	Tied UFC record for most wins in a calendar year (5). Performance of the Night.
Win	20–5	Charlie Ontiveros	TKO (submission to slam)	UFC Fight Night: Hall vs. Silva	October 31, 2020	1	2:39	Las Vegas, Nevada, United States	Performance of the Night.
Win	19–5	Darren Stewart	Decision (split)	UFC Fight Night: Covington vs. Woodley	September 19, 2020	3	5:00	Las Vegas, Nevada, United States	
Win	18–5	Joaquin Buckley	TKO (punch)	UFC Fight Night: Lewis vs. Oleinik	August 8, 2020	3	0:32	Las Vegas, Nevada, United States	Performance of the Night.
Win	17–5	Anthony Hernandez	TKO (knees and punches)	UFC on ESPN: Overeem vs. Harris	May 16, 2020	1	0:39	Jacksonville, Florida, United States	
Loss	16–5	Brendan Allen	Submission (rear-naked choke)	UFC on ESPN: Reyes vs. Weidman	October 18, 2019	2	3:38	Boston, Massachusetts, United States	
Win	16–4	Alessio Di Chirico	Decision (unanimous)	UFC Fight Night: Moicano vs. The Korean Zombie	June 22, 2019	3	5:00	Greenville, South Carolina, United States	
Win	15–4	Gerald Meerschaert	Decision (split)	UFC on ESPN: Barboza vs. Gaethje	March 30, 2019	3	5:00	Philadelphia, Pennsylvania, United States	
Win	14–4	John Phillips	Submission (rear-naked choke)	UFC Fight Night: Blaydes vs. Ngannou 2	November 24, 2018	3	4:05	Beijing, China	
Loss	13–4	Thiago Santos	Decision (unanimous)	UFC 227	August 4, 2018	3	5:00	Los Angeles, California, United States	
Win	13–3	Will Santiago Jr.	Decision (unanimous)	Dana White's Contender Series 9	June 12, 2018	3	5:00	Las Vegas, Nevada, United States	
Win	12–3	Teagan Dooley	Submission (triangle choke)	Bellator 195	March 2, 2018	1	2:59	Thackerville, Oklahoma, United States	
Win	11–3	Hayward Charles	TKO (punches)	Xtreme Knockout 39	January 6, 2018	3	3:34	Dallas, Texas, United States	Defended the XKO Middleweight Championship.
Win	10–3	Grady Hurley	TKO (knee and punches)	LFA 21	September 1, 2017	1	1:24	Branson, Missouri, United States	
Loss	9–3	Curtis Millender	Decision (unanimous)	LFA 13	June 2, 2017	3	5:00	Burbank, California, United States	Welterweight bout.
Win	9–2	David Gomez	TKO (punches)	KOTC: Supernova	March 18, 2017	1	3:34	Ontario, California, United States	
Win	8–2	Geoff Neal	TKO (punches)	Xtreme Knockout 34	January 28, 2017	3	3:50	Dallas, Texas, United States	Defended the XKO Middleweight Championship.
Win	7–2	Jose Alfredo Leija	TKO (submission to punches)	Xtreme Knockout 33	November 5, 2016	1	4:03	Dallas, Texas, United States	Return to Middleweight. Won the XKO Middleweight Championship.
Win	6–2	Sam Liera	Submission (guillotine choke)	KOTC: Martial Law	September 18, 2016	2	4:23	Ontario, California, United States	
Win	5–2	Sam Liera	TKO (punches)	KOTC: Night of Champions	March 5, 2016	2	2:56	Ontario, California, United States	Return to Welterweight.
Loss	4–2	Rafael Lovato Jr.	Submission (rear-naked choke)	Legacy FC 46	October 2, 2015	1	1:24	Allen, Texas, United States	Middleweight debut.
Loss	4–1	Ramil Mustapaev	Decision (unanimous)	Genesis Combat Sports 4	August 15, 2015	3	5:00	Abilene, Texas, United States	Catchweight (175 lb) bout.
Win	4–0	Victor Reyna	Submission (guillotine choke)	Xtreme Knockout 26	June 27, 2015	1	3:44	Dallas, Texas, United States	
Win	3–0	Aaron Reves	Submission (verbal)	Kickass Productions: Border Wars 1	May 29, 2015	1	0:22	Laredo, Texas, United States	Catchweight (174 lb) bout; Holland missed weight.
Win	2–0	Jason Perrotta	TKO (punches)	Genesis Combat Sports 3	April 25, 2015	1	1:36	Lubbock, Texas, United States	Catchweight (195 lb) bout.
Win	1–0	Marcos Ayub	TKO (punches)	Xtreme Knockout 25	March 28, 2015	1	1:54	Arlington, Texas, United States	Welterweight debut.

== Kickboxing record ==
Kickboxing record
2 wins (2 KOs), 1 loss, 0 draws
Date	Result	Opponent	Event	Location	Method	Round	Time	Record
2017-10-21	Win	(United States) Bubba McDaniel	XKO 38	Dallas, United States	KO (Spinning Back Elbow)	1	1:29	2–1
2017-8-12	Win	(United States) Matt Foster	XKO 37	Dallas, United States	KO (Punches)	1	3:00	1–1
2016-4-30	Loss	(United States) William Florentino	XKO 30	Dallas, United States	Decision (Split)	1	3:00	0–1
Legend: Win Loss Draw/No contest Notes

== Amateur mixed martial arts record ==
Amateur record breakdown		
5 matches	5 wins	0 losses
By knockout	3	0
By decision	2	0

Res.	Record	Opponent	Method	Event	Date	Round	Time	Location	Notes
Win	5–0	William Clark	TKO (punches)	Cowboys Extreme Cagefighting	March 29, 2014	2	1:14	San Antonio, Texas, United States	Won the vacant PCG Welterweight Championship.
Win	4–0	Terrence Moore	TKO (punches)	Belts of Honorious: Austin Championships	September 7, 2013	2	0:06	Austin, Texas, United States	Won the vacant BOH Welterweight Championship.
Win	3–0	Natanael Chavez	TKO (punches)	Cowboys Extreme Cagefighting	June 8, 2013	2	2:08	San Antonio, Texas, United States	
Win	2–0	Zack Reese	Decision (unanimous)	Cowboys Extreme Cagefighting	October 6, 2012	3	3:00	San Antonio, Texas, United States	
Win	1–0	Richard Bailey	Decision (unanimous)	Premiere Combat Group	August 4, 2012	3	3:00	San Antonio, Texas, United States	

== See also ==
- List of current UFC fighters
- List of Dana White's Contender Series alumni
- List of male mixed martial artists
