= Kyle Daukaus =

American mixed martial artist (b. 1993)

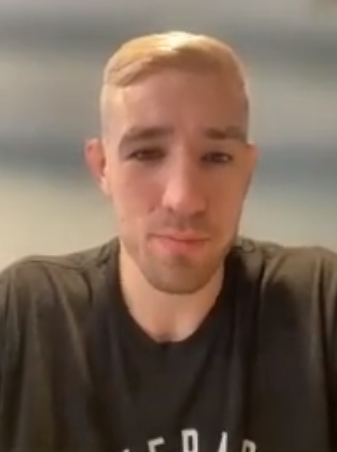
- Daukaus in 2025
- Born: February 27, 1993 (age 33); Philadelphia, Pennsylvania, U.S.
- Other names: The D'Arce Knight
- Height: 6 ft 3 in (1.91 m)
- Weight: 185 lb (84 kg; 13 st 3 lb)
- Division: Middleweight
- Reach: 76 in (193 cm)
- Fighting out of: Philadelphia, Pennsylvania, U.S.
- Team: The Forge MMA
- Rank: Black belt in Brazilian Jiu-Jitsu; Purple belt in Muay Thai under Duane Ludwig
- Years active: 2017–present

Mixed martial arts record
- Total: 24
- Wins: 17
- By knockout: 2
- By submission: 12
- By decision: 3
- Losses: 6
- By knockout: 4
- By decision: 2
- No contests: 1

Other information
- Mixed martial arts record from Sherdog

Kyle Daukaus (/ˈdɔːkəs/ DAW-kəs; born February 27, 1993) is an American mixed martial artist who currently competes in the Middleweight division of the Ultimate Fighting Championship (UFC). He formerly competed in Cage Fury Fighting Championships (CFFC), where he is the former two-time Middleweight Champion. He is also the younger brother of former UFC fighter Chris Daukaus.

== Background ==
Daukaus was raised in Northeast Philadelphia in the Tacony neighborhood, where he still lives and trains. He attended Father Judge High School. When he was younger, Daukaus and his older brother Chris Daukaus would watch UFC fights together and then grapple with each other in their basement. Eventually, the brothers entered a grappling tournament, where both would finish second, despite having minimal formal training. The Daukaus brothers decided to take up MMA soon after, and both are now fighters in the UFC. After high school, Kyle weighed approximately 260 pounds, and his MMA coach suggested that he needed to take heavyweight bouts. Kyle would have a back-and-forth amateur fighting career, going 5–5 in his bouts. He would eventually drop down from 205 pounds to fight at 185 pounds, where he currently competes in the middleweight division.

== Mixed martial arts career ==
=== Early career ===
Making his MMA debut at AFL 53, he faced Dino Juklo, submitting him via rear-naked choke in the first round. Daukaus would also to submit his next five opponents in Tyler Bayer, Kyle Walker, Elijah Gboille, Dustin Long, culminating in submitting Jonavin Webb via brabo choke at CFFC 72. At Dana White's Contender Series 18 he took on Michael Lombardo and defeated him via unanimous decision to pick up his first and only decision win at that point as a professional.

In the co-main event of CFFC 78, Daukaus submitted Stephen Regman in the second round via brabo choke. At CFFC 81 he tapped out Nolan Norwood via brabo choke in round two.

=== Ultimate Fighting Championship ===
Daukaus made his UFC debut as a short notice injury replacement for Ian Heinisch against Brendan Allen on June 27, 2020, at UFC on ESPN: Poirier vs. Hooker. He lost the fight via unanimous decision.

Daukaus faced Dustin Stoltzfus on November 21, 2020, at UFC 255. After dominating the bout, he won it via unanimous decision.

Daukaus was scheduled to face Aliskhab Khizriev on April 10, 2021, at UFC on ABC: Vettori vs. Holland. However, the bout was pulled from the card on April 7 due to COVID-19 protocols.

Daukaus faced Phil Hawes on May 8, 2021, at UFC on ESPN: Rodriguez vs. Waterson. He lost the fight via unanimous decision.

As the first bout of his new four-fight contract, Daukaus faced Kevin Holland on October 2, 2021, at UFC Fight Night 193. A clash of heads early into the fight knocked Holland unconscious briefly, but he continued to fight and was eventually submitted by Daukaus via a standing rear-naked choke. However, referee Dan Miragliotta reviewed the footage via replay and it was deemed the head clash led to the sequence of events resulting in Daukaus' win. Therefore, the fight was declared a no contest after the accidental headbutt. The rematch of the pair was scheduled on November 13, 2021, at UFC Fight Night 197. However, Holland withdrew from the bout due to injury and was replaced by Roman Dolidze. In turn, the bout was scrapped due to COVID-19 protocols related to Dolidze’s camp.

Daukaus was scheduled to face Julian Marquez on February 19, 2022, at UFC Fight Night 201. However, Marquez was pulled from the event for undisclosed reasons, and he was replaced by Jamie Pickett. He won the fight via D'Arce choke submission in the first round. The win earned Daukaus his first Performance of the Night bonus award.

Daukaus was rescheduled to face Roman Dolidze on June 18, 2022, at UFC on ESPN 37. He lost the fight via knockout in round one.

Daukaus faced Eryk Anders on December 3, 2022, at UFC on ESPN 42. He lost the bout via TKO stoppage in the second round.

It was announced in late January 2023 that Daukaus had fought out his contract, and was not re-signed by the UFC.

=== Post UFC ===
In his first bout after leaving the UFC, Daukaus faced Robert Gidron on June 16, 2023, at CFFC 120, defeating him via rear-naked choke at the end of the first round.

On September 2, 2023, Daukaus won the CFFC Middleweight championship for the second time after defeating Gregg Ellis by unanimous decision.

Daukaus defended his title against Sean Connor Fallon on February 9, 2024 at CFFC 129. He would win the fight via third round submission.

Daukaus defended his title against Keanan Patershuk on June 14, 2024 at CFFC 132 by knockout in the first round.

On December 11, 2024, it was announced that Daukaus was eligible to be drafted in the Global Fight League. However, he was not drafted for the 2025 season. In turn, in April 2025, it was reported that all GFL events were cancelled indefinitely.

=== Return to the UFC ===
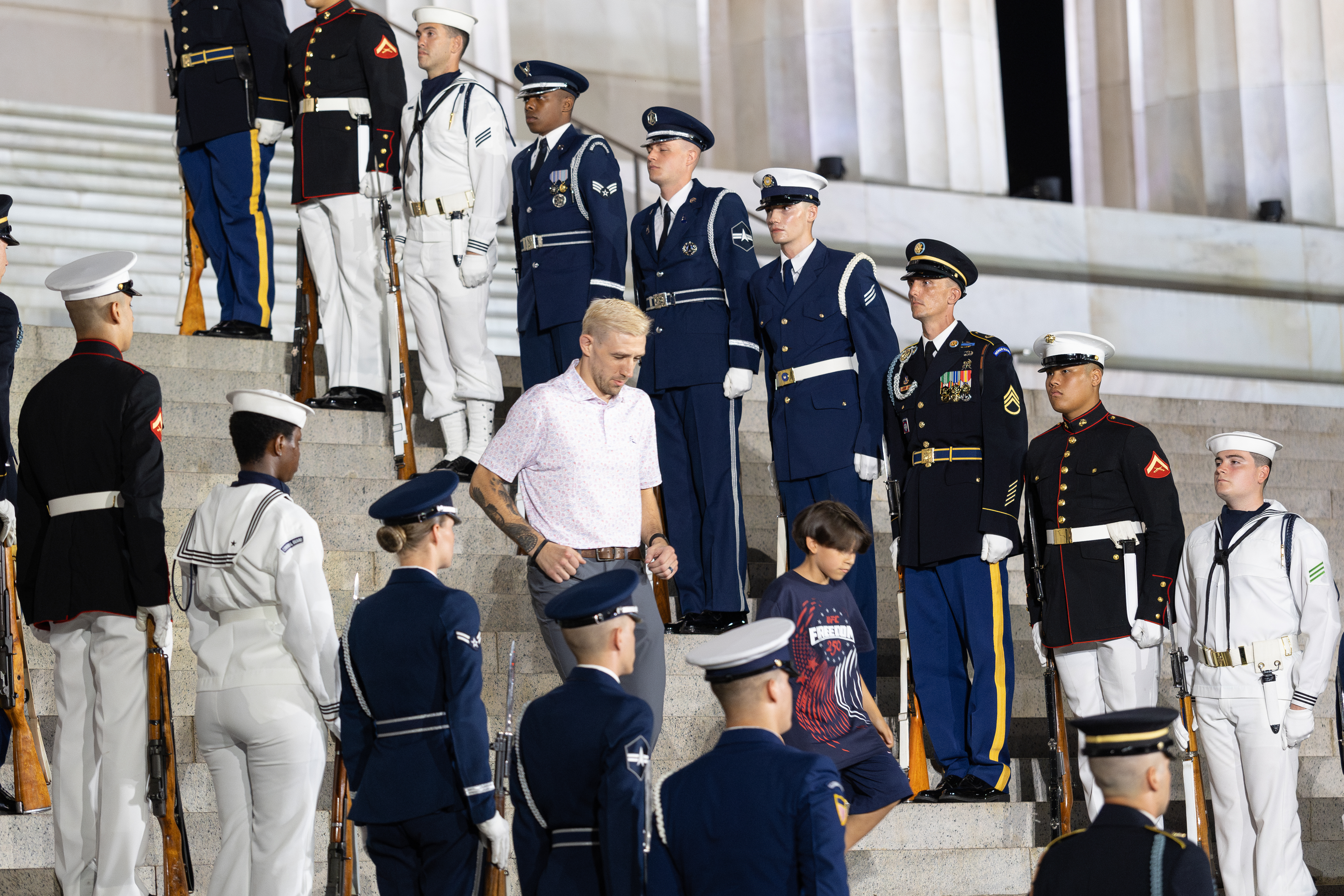
Daukaus walking down the steps of the Lincoln Memorial for the UFC Freedom 250 press conference.

Replacing Marco Tulio, who withdrew due to unknown reasons, Daukaus made his return to the UFC against Michel Pereira on August 23, 2025 at UFC Fight Night 257. He won the fight via knockout in round one. This fight earned him another Performance of the Night award.

Daukaus faced Gerald Meerschaert on November 15, 2025, at UFC 322. He won the fight via a brabo choke submission in the first round.

Daukaus was scheduled to face Vicente Luque on April 11, 2026 at UFC 327. However, he withdrew after being re‑scheduled for the UFC Freedom 250 card and was replaced by Kelvin Gastelum.

He ended up facing Bo Nickal on June 14, 2026 at UFC Freedom 250. He lost the fight by technical knockout in the first round.

Daukaus faced Marc-André Barriault on October 17, 2026, at UFC Fight Night 291. He lost the fight by technical knockout via elbows in the first round.

== Professional grappling career ==
Daukaus competed against Eryk Anders at Fury Pro Grappling 8 on December 30, 2023. He lost the match by decision.

== Personal life ==
As of November 2025, Daukaus has a two-year-old son named Kai Alexander and is expecting a second son, Kal Atlas, whose birth is anticipated between Thanksgiving and Christmas. The names were chosen to reflect the initials KAD, which correspond to both parents, Kyle A. Daukaus and his wife Katharine Alaina, and include the children's middle names.

== Championships and accomplishments ==
- Ultimate Fighting Championship
  - Performance of the Night (Two times) vs. Jamie Pickett and Michel Pereira
  - Fastest D'Arche choke submission victory in UFC history (0:50) (vs. Gerald Meerschaert)
- Cage Fury Fighting Championships
  - Cage Fury Middleweight Championship (Two times; former)
    - Two successful title defenses (first reign)
    - Two successful title defenses (second reign)
    - Most Cage Fury Middleweight title fight wins (6)

== Mixed martial arts record ==
Professional record breakdown
24 matches	17 wins	6 losses
By knockout	2	4
By submission	12	0
By decision	3	2
No contests	1	

Res.	Record	Opponent	Method	Event	Date	Round	Time	Location	Notes
Loss	17–6 (1)	Marc-André Barriault	TKO (punches and elbows)	UFC Fight Night: Buckley vs. Malott	October 17, 2026	1	4:28	Edmonton, Alberta, Canada	
Loss	17–5 (1)	Bo Nickal	TKO (punches and elbows)	UFC Freedom 250	June 14, 2026	1	4:34	Washington, D.C., United States	
Win	17–4 (1)	Gerald Meerschaert	Submission (brabo choke)	UFC 322	November 15, 2025	1	0:50	New York City, New York, United States	
Win	16–4 (1)	Michel Pereira	KO (punches and elbows)	UFC Fight Night: Walker vs. Zhang	August 23, 2025	1	0:43	Shanghai, China	Performance of the Night.
Win	15–4 (1)	Keanan Patershuk	KO (punches)	Cage Fury FC 132	June 14, 2024	1	1:24	Philadelphia, Pennsylvania, United States	Defended the Cage Fury FC Middleweight Championship.
Win	14–4 (1)	Sean Connor Fallon	Submission (brabo choke)	Cage Fury FC 129	February 9, 2024	3	3:45	Philadelphia, Pennsylvania, United States	Defended the Cage Fury FC Middleweight Championship.
Win	13–4 (1)	Gregg Ellis	Decision (unanimous)	Cage Fury FC 124	September 2, 2023	4	5:00	Bensalem, Pennsylvania, United States	Won the Cage Fury FC Middleweight Championship.
Win	12–4 (1)	Robert Gidron	Submission (rear-naked choke)	Cage Fury FC 120	June 16, 2023	1	4:59	Atlantic City, New Jersey, United States	
Loss	11–4 (1)	Eryk Anders	TKO (punches)	UFC on ESPN: Thompson vs. Holland	December 3, 2022	2	2:45	Orlando, Florida, United States	
Loss	11–3 (1)	Roman Dolidze	KO (knee and punches)	UFC on ESPN: Kattar vs. Emmett	June 18, 2022	1	1:13	Austin, Texas, United States	
Win	11–2 (1)	Jamie Pickett	Submission (brabo choke)	UFC Fight Night: Walker vs. Hill	February 19, 2022	1	4:59	Las Vegas, Nevada, United States	Catchweight (195 lb) bout. Performance of the Night.
NC	10–2 (1)	Kevin Holland	NC (accidental clash of heads)	UFC Fight Night: Santos vs. Walker	October 2, 2021	1	3:43	Las Vegas, Nevada, United States	Accidental clash of heads knocked Holland unconscious.
Loss	10–2	Phil Hawes	Decision (unanimous)	UFC on ESPN: Rodriguez vs. Waterson	May 8, 2021	3	5:00	Las Vegas, Nevada, United States	
Win	10–1	Dustin Stoltzfus	Decision (unanimous)	UFC 255	November 21, 2020	3	5:00	Las Vegas, Nevada, United States	
Loss	9–1	Brendan Allen	Decision (unanimous)	UFC on ESPN: Poirier vs. Hooker	June 27, 2020	3	5:00	Las Vegas, Nevada, United States	
Win	9–0	Nolan Norwood	Submission (brabo choke)	Cage Fury FC 81	February 1, 2020	2	4:36	Bensalem, Pennsylvania, United States	Defended the Cage Fury FC Middleweight Championship.
Win	8–0	Stephen Regman	Submission (brabo choke)	Cage Fury FC 78	September 21, 2019	2	0:52	Philadelphia, Pennsylvania, United States	Defended the Cage Fury FC Middleweight Championship.
Win	7–0	Michael Lombardo	Decision (unanimous)	Dana White's Contender Series 18	June 25, 2019	3	5:00	Las Vegas, Nevada, United States	
Win	6–0	Jonavin Webb	Technical Submission (brabo choke)	Cage Fury FC 72	February 16, 2019	3	5:00	Atlantic City, New Jersey, United States	Won the vacant Cage Fury FC Middleweight Championship.
Win	5–0	Dustin Long	Submission (rear-naked choke)	Ring of Combat 66	November 16, 2018	1	2:51	Atlantic City, New Jersey, United States	
Win	4–0	Elijah Gbollie	Submission (rear-naked choke)	Art of War Cage Fighting 5	February 16, 2018	2	4:30	Philadelphia, Pennsylvania, United States	
Win	3–0	Tyler Bayer	Submission (brabo choke)	Cage Fury FC 69	December 16, 2017	2	2:32	Atlantic City, New Jersey, United States	
Win	2–0	Kyle Walker	Submission (brabo choke)	KOTC: Regulator	July 1, 2017	1	1:41	Stroudsburg, Pennsylvania, United States	
Win	1–0	Dino Juklo	Submission (rear-naked choke)	Asylum Fight League 53	February 18, 2017	1	2:35	Philadelphia, Pennsylvania, United States	Middleweight debut.

== See also ==
- List of current UFC fighters
- List of Dana White's Contender Series alumni
- List of male mixed martial artists
