= Roman Dolidze =

Georgian mixed martial artist (born 1988)

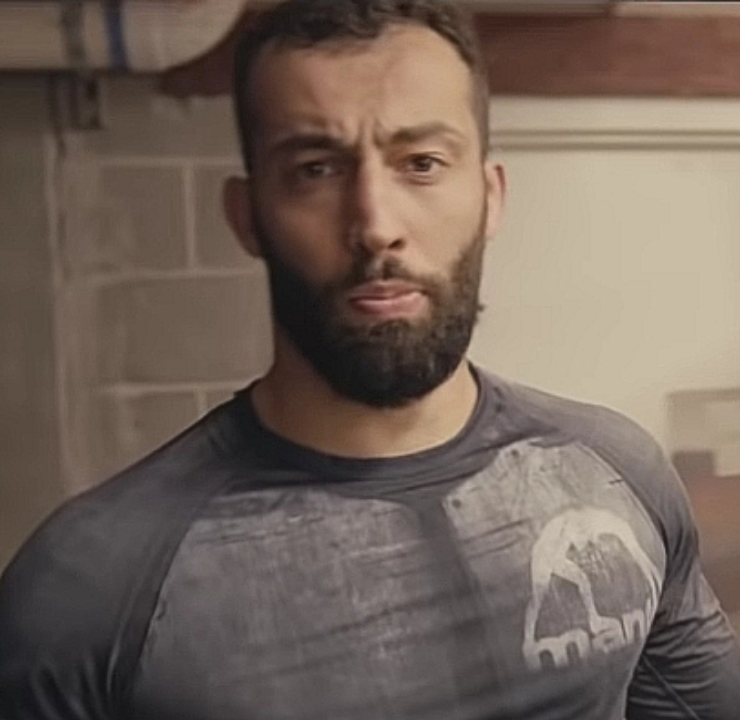
- Dolidze in 2019
- Born: 15 July 1988 (age 38); Batumi, Adjara, Georgian SSR, Soviet Union
- Nickname: The Caucasian
- Nationality: Georgian
- Height: 6 ft 3 in (1.91 m)
- Weight: 185 lb (84 kg; 13 st 3 lb)
- Division: Heavyweight (2016); Light Heavyweight (2017–2020, 2024, 2026-present); Middleweight (2021–2026)
- Reach: 76 in (193 cm)
- Stance: Orthodox
- Fighting out of: Batumi, Georgia
- Team: American Kickboxing Academy; Xtreme Couture MMA
- Years active: 2016–present

Mixed martial arts record
- Total: 21
- Wins: 15
- By knockout: 8
- By submission: 3
- By decision: 4
- Losses: 6
- By knockout: 1
- By submission: 1
- By decision: 4

Other information
- Mixed martial arts record from Sherdog

Roman Dolidze (born 15 July 1988) is a Georgian professional mixed martial artist. He currently competes in the Light Heavyweight division of the Ultimate Fighting Championship (UFC). A professional since 2016, Dolidze was the former World Warriors Fight Championship (WWFC) light heavyweight champion, ADCC Asia & Oceania champion, and Grappling FILA world champion.

== Background ==
Dolidze was born on 15 July 1988, in Batumi, Georgian SSR, Soviet Union (now Georgia). Dolidze played soccer for eight years, the last three years of which spent as a professional goalkeeper in Turkey. At the age of 20, he moved to Ukraine to study shipbuilding engineering at Odesa Maritime Academy, and started training in Sambo, Brazilian Jiu-Jitsu and eventually Wrestling. He then also earned a degree in business administration. He went on to become the World Grappling Champion and the European Grappling Champion under United World Wrestling rules, as well as becoming the ADCC Asia & Oceania Champion at 99 kg (218 pounds) in 2016. This earned him a spot in the prestigious ADCC Worlds Tournament in 2017, however he was defeated in the first round. Aged 28, he started to train in MMA.

== Mixed martial arts career ==
=== Early career ===
Dolidze made his MMA debut in 2016, where he was fighting out of Odesa, Ukraine. After winning his debut fight against Alexander Kovbel, Dolidze would go on to amass a 4–0 record in the Ukrainian circuit, before being given the chance to fight Eder de Souza for the vacant WWFC Light Heavyweight title. He beat de Souza by a second-round knockout. He was scheduled to defend his title against Michał Pasternak at WWFC 13. Dolidze beat Pasternak by a third-round knockout.

=== Ultimate Fighting Championship ===
Dolidze got signed to the UFC but before he made his debut, he tested positive for clomiphene and its metabolites M1 and M2, as well as a long-term metabolite of dehydrochlormethyltestosterone (DHCMT), 4-chloro-18-nor-17β-hydroxymethyl,17α-methyl-5α-androst-13-en-3α-ol (M3), as the result of an out-of-competition urine sample collected on 12 March 2019. He was suspended for one year due to this violation and he was eligible to fight on 12 March 2020.

On 3 September 2020, Dolidze along with Ryan Benoit, were granted temporary licenses following special hearings by the Nevada State Athletic Commission after they had recurring issues with the long-term metabolite of Turinabol pulsing in their system in trace amounts, long after ingestion. Both Benoit and Dolidze have already been suspended by United States Anti-Doping Agency (USADA), the UFC's anti-doping partner. Neither were facing a violation in Nevada, but the UFC wanted to get ahead of a potential issue. This was after USADA added a threshold for the presence of the M3 metabolite of DHCMT. If a test result is below 100 picograms per milliliter of the substance, it is no longer considered a violation, but an atypical finding, providing there is no evidence of new ingestion or performance-enhancing effects. Benoit and Dolidze were granted temporary licenses to compete beginning 1 December following a six-month period of bimonthly testing by USADA.

A bout between Khadis Ibragimov and Roman Dolidze was initially scheduled for the promotion's inaugural event in Kazakhstan planned a month prior. However, the fight was postponed after the card was moved to Las Vegas due to travel restrictions for both participants related to the COVID-19 pandemic. The pairing was left intact and eventually took place on 19 July 2020, at UFC Fight Night 172. Dolidze won the fight via technical knockout in round one after in process of high kick, Ibragimov tried to go for a takedown, during which Dolidze hit him with a knee, knocking Ibragimov out.

Dolidze faced John Allan at UFC on ESPN 19 on 5 December 2020. He won the bout via split decision; however 19 out of 19 media members scored it a 30–27 for Dolidze.

Dolidze, as a replacement for Dricus du Plessis, faced Trevin Giles in his middleweight debut on 20 March 2021, at UFC on ESPN 21 He lost the close bout via unanimous decision.

Dolidze was scheduled to face Alessio Di Chirico on 5 June 2021, at UFC Fight Night 189. However, Di Chirico pulled out of the contest in mid-May due to an injury. Di Chirico was replaced by Laureano Staropoli. In a lackluster fight where Dolidze mostly held Staropoli in the clinch, he won the fight via unanimous decision.

Dolidze was scheduled to face Eryk Anders on 13 November 2021, at UFC Fight Night 197. However, Anders was pulled the event for undisclosed reasons, and he was replaced by Kyle Daukaus. In turn, the bout was scrapped due to COVID-19 protocols related to Dolidze’s camp.

Dolidze was scheduled to face Brendan Allen, replacing Brad Tavares on 4 December 2021, at UFC on ESPN 31. However, Dolidze was forced to pull from the bout due to complications in his recovery from COVID-19 and he was replaced by Chris Curtis.

Dolidze was rescheduled to face Kyle Daukaus on 18 June 2022, at UFC on ESPN 37. He won the bout via knockout in round one. This win earned him the Performance of the Night award.

Dolidze faced Phil Hawes on 29 October 2022, at UFC Fight Night 213. He won the fight via knockout in round one. This fight earned him another Performance of the Night award.

Dolidze, replacing Derek Brunson who withdrew due to an undisclosed injury, faced Jack Hermansson on 3 December 2022, at UFC on ESPN 42. He won the bout via ground and pound TKO in the second round. This fight earned him another Performance of the Night award.

Dolidze faced Marvin Vettori on 18 March 2023, at UFC 286. He lost the fight via unanimous decision. 14 out of 28 media outlets scored the bout for both Dolidze and Vettori.

Dolidze was scheduled to face Derek Brunson at UFC 295 on 11 November 2023. However, Brunson announced on 14 September that he was parting ways with the organization, and the bout was scrapped.

Dolidze was scheduled to face Jared Cannonier on 2 December 2023, at UFC on ESPN 52. However, Cannonier suffered an MCL tear in October during training and the bout was scrapped.

Dolidze faced Nassourdine Imavov on 3 February 2024, at UFC Fight Night 235 in his first UFC main event. He lost the bout by majority decision.

Dolidze was scheduled to face Anthony Hernandez on 1 June 2024 at UFC 302. However Hernandez was forced out of the bout due to a torn ligament in his hand and the bout was cancelled.

It was briefly announced that Dolidze would face Michel Pereira on 8 June 2024, at UFC on ESPN 57. However, Pereira claimed he never signed any contracts for the fight and the bout fell through.

Dolidze, on short notice and as a replacement for Carlos Ulberg, faced Anthony Smith in a Light Heavyweight bout on 29 June 2024 at UFC 303. He won the fight by unanimous decision.

Replacing an injured Chris Curtis, Dolidze faced Kevin Holland on 5 October 2024 at UFC 307. Dolidze won the fight by technical knockout due to a corner stoppage as a result of a rib injury at the end of the first round.

Dolidze rematched former UFC Middleweight title challenger Marvin Vettori in the main event on 15 March 2025 at UFC Fight Night 254. He won the fight by unanimous decision.

Dolidze's bout with former LFA Middleweight Champion Anthony Hernandez was rescheduled and took place on 9 August 2025 in the main event at UFC on ESPN 72. Dolidze lost the fight via a rear-naked choke submission in the fourth round.

Dolidze faced Christian Leroy Duncan on 21 March 2026, at UFC Fight Night 270. He lost the fight by unanimous decision.

Returning to light heavyweight, Dolidze faced Reinier de Ridder on 22 August 2026 at UFC Fight Night 285. He lost the fight via technical knockout in round one.

== Personal life ==
Dolidze is a father of three sons.

== Championships and accomplishments ==
=== Mixed martial arts ===
- Ultimate Fighting Championship
  - Performance of the Night (Three times) vs. Kyle Daukaus, Phil Hawes and Jack Hermansson
  - UFC.com Awards
    - 2022: Ranked #10 Fighter of the Year & Ranked #9 Upset of the Year vs. Jack Hermansson
- World Warriors Fight Championship
  - WWFC Light Heavyweight Championship
    - One successful title defense
- MMA Fighting
  - 2022 Second Team MMA All-Star

=== Grappling ===
- ADCC Asia & Oceania Champion
  - 2016 ADCC Asia trials (gold) (99 kg)
- Grappling World Champion FILA

== Mixed martial arts record ==
Professional record breakdown
21 matches	15 wins	6 losses
By knockout	8	1
By submission	3	1
By decision	4	4

Res.	Record	Opponent	Method	Event	Date	Round	Time	Location	Notes
Loss	15–6	Reinier de Ridder	TKO (punches)	UFC Fight Night: Hernandez vs. Rodrigues	August 22, 2026	1	4:01	Sacramento, California, United States	Return to Light Heavyweight.
Loss	15–5	Christian Leroy Duncan	Decision (unanimous)	UFC Fight Night: Evloev vs. Murphy	21 March 2026	3	5:00	London, England	
Loss	15–4	Anthony Hernandez	Submission (rear-naked choke)	UFC on ESPN: Dolidze vs. Hernandez	9 August 2025	4	2:45	Las Vegas, Nevada, United States	
Win	15–3	Marvin Vettori	Decision (unanimous)	UFC Fight Night: Vettori vs. Dolidze 2	15 March 2025	5	5:00	Las Vegas, Nevada, United States	
Win	14–3	Kevin Holland	TKO (corner stoppage)	UFC 307	5 October 2024	1	5:00	Salt Lake City, Utah, United States	
Win	13–3	Anthony Smith	Decision (unanimous)	UFC 303	29 June 2024	3	5:00	Las Vegas, Nevada, United States	Light Heavyweight bout.
Loss	12–3	Nassourdine Imavov	Decision (majority)	UFC Fight Night: Dolidze vs. Imavov	3 February 2024	5	5:00	Las Vegas, Nevada, United States	Imavov was deducted one point in round 4 due to an illegal soccer kick.
Loss	12–2	Marvin Vettori	Decision (unanimous)	UFC 286	18 March 2023	3	5:00	London, England	
Win	12–1	Jack Hermansson	TKO (punches)	UFC on ESPN: Thompson vs. Holland	3 December 2022	2	4:06	Orlando, Florida, United States	Performance of the Night.
Win	11–1	Phil Hawes	KO (punches)	UFC Fight Night: Kattar vs. Allen	29 October 2022	1	4:09	Las Vegas, Nevada, United States	Performance of the Night.
Win	10–1	Kyle Daukaus	KO (knee and punches)	UFC on ESPN: Kattar vs. Emmett	18 June 2022	1	1:13	Austin, Texas, United States	Performance of the Night.
Win	9–1	Laureano Staropoli	Decision (unanimous)	UFC Fight Night: Rozenstruik vs. Sakai	5 June 2021	3	5:00	Las Vegas, Nevada, United States	
Loss	8–1	Trevin Giles	Decision (unanimous)	UFC on ESPN: Brunson vs. Holland	20 March 2021	3	5:00	Las Vegas, Nevada, United States	Middleweight debut.
Win	8–0	John Allan	Decision (split)	UFC on ESPN: Hermansson vs. Vettori	5 December 2020	3	5:00	Las Vegas, Nevada, United States	
Win	7–0	Khadis Ibragimov	TKO (knee and punches)	UFC Fight Night: Figueiredo vs. Benavidez 2	19 July 2020	1	4:15	Abu Dhabi, United Arab Emirates	
Win	6–0	Michał Pasternak	KO (punch)	World Warriors FC 13	18 December 2018	3	3:00	Kyiv, Ukraine	Defended the WWFC Light Heavyweight Championship.
Win	5–0	Eder de Souza	KO (punch)	World Warriors FC 11	16 June 2018	2	3:36	Kyiv, Ukraine	Won the vacant WWFC Light Heavyweight Championship.
Win	4–0	Amirali Zhoroev	TKO (punches)	World Warriors FC 9	14 December 2017	1	3:34	Kyiv, Ukraine	
Win	3–0	Jumabek Ayjigit Uulu	Submission (rear-naked choke)	World Warriors FC 7	14 June 2017	1	1:21	Kyiv, Ukraine	
Win	2–0	Rémi Delcampe	Submission (heel hook)	World Warriors FC 6	29 March 2017	1	0:56	Kyiv, Ukraine	Light Heavyweight debut.
Win	1–0	Alexander Kovbel	Submission (heel hook)	Real Fight Promotion 53	9 December 2016	1	0:42	Odesa, Ukraine	Heavyweight debut.

== See also ==
- List of current UFC fighters
- List of male mixed martial artists
