= Brendan Allen =

American mixed martial artist (born 1995)

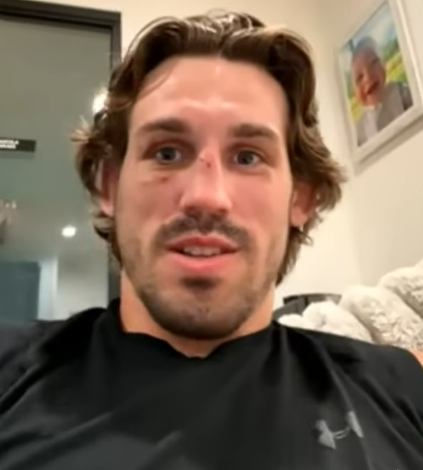
- Allen in 2022
- Born: Brendan Cody Allen; December 28, 1995 (age 30); Beaufort, South Carolina, U.S.
- Other names: All In
- Height: 6 ft 2 in (1.88 m)
- Weight: 185 lb (84 kg; 13 st 3 lb)
- Division: Welterweight (2015); Middleweight (2016–present); Light Heavyweight (2022)
- Reach: 75 in (191 cm)
- Fighting out of: Delray Beach, Florida, U.S.
- Team: Clementi's Gladiator Academy (until 2017); Roufusport (2017–2020); Kill Cliff FC (2020–2025) VFS Academy (2025-present)
- Rank: Black belt in Brazilian Jiu-Jitsu under Daniel Wanderley
- Years active: 2015–present

Mixed martial arts record
- Total: 35
- Wins: 28
- By knockout: 6
- By submission: 15
- By decision: 7
- Losses: 7
- By knockout: 2
- By submission: 1
- By decision: 4

Other information
- University: Southeastern Louisiana University, majoring in criminal justice.
- Mixed martial arts record from Sherdog

Brendan Cody Allen (born December 28, 1995) is an American professional mixed martial artist. He currently competes in the Middleweight division of the Ultimate Fighting Championship (UFC). A professional since 2015, he has also competed for the Legacy Fighting Alliance, where he is a former Middleweight Champion. As of October 10, 2026, he is #4 in the Meta UFC middleweight rankings.

== Background ==
Allen was born to Michelle and James Allen of Louisiana. Allen's maternal grandparents are from Edmonton, Alberta, Canada. Allen has an older brother.

Brendan started training in Brazilian jiu-jitsu when he was 13 after watching a jiu-jitsu class with his brother. In high school, Allen started competing in Mississippi after he had some training in both wrestling and boxing.

He attended Southeastern Louisiana University, majoring in criminal justice. Allen later joined Clementi's Gladiator Academy to train in mixed martial arts. After winning the IMMAF 2015 Amateur Middleweight Championship, Allen turned to compete in professional MMA.

== Mixed martial arts career ==
=== Early career ===
Allen started his professional MMA career in 2015 and fought under various promotions in the South. He was the Legacy Fighting Alliance middleweight champion twice, defeating Tim Hiley and Moses Murrietta at LFA 50 and LFA 61, respectively.

=== Dana White's Contender Series ===
Allen appeared in Dana White's Contender Series 20 on July 16, 2019, facing Aaron Jeffery. He won the fight via a submission in the first round. With this win, he was awarded a UFC contract.

=== Ultimate Fighting Championship ===
In his UFC debut, Allen was scheduled to face Eric Spicely on October 18, 2019, at UFC on ESPN 6. However, Spicely was forced to withdraw from the event due to an undisclosed reason. Allen instead faced Kevin Holland. He won the fight via a submission in round two.

Allen's next fight came on February 29, 2020, facing Tom Breese at UFC Fight Night 169. He won the fight by TKO in the first round.

Allan was scheduled to face Ian Heinisch on June 27, 2020, at UFC on ESPN 12. However, Heinisch pulled out of the match up in mid-June citing an injury and was replaced by promotional newcomer Kyle Daukaus. He won the fight via unanimous decision.

The bout between Heinisch and Allen was rescheduled to November 7, 2020, at UFC on ESPN 17. On the day of the event, the UFC announced the bout was once again canceled due to Heinisch testing positive for COVID-19.

Replacing Heinisch and having fought two weeks prior, Sean Strickland took on Allen on November 14, 2020, in a Catchweight (195 lb) bout, at UFC Fight Night 182. Allen lost the fight via technical knockout in round two.

Allen faced Karl Roberson on April 24, 2021, at UFC 261. He won the bout via ankle hook submission at the end of the first round.

Replacing injured Anthony Hernandez, Allen faced Punahele Soriano on July 24, 2021, at UFC on ESPN 27. Allen won the fight via unanimous decision.

Allen was scheduled to face Brad Tavares on December 4, 2021, at UFC on ESPN 31. Tavares pulled out in mid November and was replaced by Roman Dolidze. In turn Dolidze was forced to pull from the bout due to complications in his recovery from COVID-19 and he was replaced by Chris Curtis. Allen lost the fight via technical knockout in round two.

Allen faced Sam Alvey, replacing Phil Hawes, in a Light Heavyweight bout, on February 5, 2022, at UFC Fight Night 200. He won the fight via rear-naked choke submission in the second round.

Allen faced Jacob Malkoun on June 11, 2022, at UFC 275. He won the bout via unanimous decision.

Allen faced Krzysztof Jotko on October 1, 2022, at UFC Fight Night 211. He won the bout at the end of the first round, submitting Jotko via rear-naked choke. This win earned him the Performance of the Night award.

Allen faced André Muniz on February 25, 2023, at UFC Fight Night 220. He won the fight via a rear-naked choke submission in round three. This win earned him the Performance of the Night bonus.

Allen was scheduled to face Jack Hermansson on June 3, 2023, at UFC on ESPN 46. However, Hermansson withdrew in late April due to an undisclosed injury and the bout was cancelled.

Allen faced Bruno Silva on June 24, 2023 at UFC on ABC 5. He won the bout in the first round via a rear-naked choke submission.

Allen faced Paul Craig on November 18, 2023, at UFC Fight Night 232. He won the fight via a rear-naked choke submission in the third round. With this win, he earned a Performance of the Night award.

Allen was scheduled to face Marvin Vettori on April 6, 2024, at UFC Fight Night 240. However on March 14, it was announced that Vettori had withdrawn due to an injury, and was replaced by Chris Curtis in a rematch and again on short notice. Allen won the fight by split decision.

Allen faced Nassourdine Imavov on September 28, 2024 at UFC Fight Night 243. He lost the fight by unanimous decision.

Allen faced former LFA Middleweight Champion Anthony Hernandez in a rematch on February 22, 2025 at UFC Fight Night 252. He lost the fight by unanimous decision.

Allen's bout with Marvin Vettori was re-scheduled and took place on July 19, 2025, at UFC 318. Allen won the fight by unanimous decision. This fight earned him a Fight of the Night award.

Replacing Anthony Hernandez who had to withdraw due to an injury, Allen faced Reinier de Ridder in the main event on October 18, 2025, at UFC Fight Night 262. Allen won the bout via technical knockout at the end of the fourth round, after de Ridder was unable to continue.

Allen faced Edmen Shahbazyan on June 6, 2026, at UFC Fight Night 278. He won the fight by unanimous decision. This fight earned him a $100,000 Fight of the Night award.

Allen faced Christian Leroy Duncan in the main event on October 10, 2026, at UFC Fight Night 290. After Duncan had a point deducted for an eye poke, Allen won the bout via rear-naked choke submission in the fifth round. This fight earned him a $100,000 Performance of the Night award.

== Grappling career ==
Allen faced Caio Borralho on February 28, 2025 in a submission match at Karate Combat 53. He lost the fight by unanimous decision.

== Freestyle wrestling ==
Replacing Michael Page, Allen is scheduled to face Alexander Shlemenko on October 23, 2026 at RAF 14.

== Personal life ==
Allen and his former wife Marcela had two daughters, born in November 2019 and November 2021. He later welcomed a son with his current wife in December 2024. In January 2026, Allen and his current wife welcomed a newborn daughter. As of January 2026, his wife also has a 14‑year‑old son from a previous relationship.

His grandparents are from Edmonton, Alberta, Canada, leading him to fight under the Canadian flag at UFC Vancouver in October 2025.

== Championships and accomplishments ==
- Ultimate Fighting Championship
  - Fight of the Night (Two times) vs. Marvin Vettori and Edmen Shahbazyan
  - Performance of the Night (Four times) vs. Krzysztof Jotko, André Muniz, Paul Craig and Christian Leroy Duncan
  - Second most submissions in UFC Middleweight division history (7) (behind Gerald Meerschaert)
    - Tied (Renato Moicano & Kenny Florian) for third most rear-naked choke submissions in UFC history (7)
    - Fourth most submission attempts in UFC Middleweight division history (16)
    - Tied (Charles Oliveira & Beatriz Mesquita) for the fourth longest submission streak in UFC history (4)
  - Tied (Kevin Holland) for most UFC wins among DWCS alumni (16)
  - Third most wins in UFC Middleweight division history (15) (behind Michael Bisping & Brad Tavares)
  - Second most top position time in UFC Middleweight division history (1:03:55) (behind Chael Sonnen)
  - Tied (Derek Brunson, Nate Marquardt & Chris Leben) for third most finishes in UFC Middleweight division history (9)
  - Fifth most control time in UFC Middleweight division history (1:14:07)
- Legacy Fighting Alliance
  - LFA Middleweight Championship (One time) vs. Tim Hiley and Moses Murrietta.
    - One successful defense
- International Mixed Martial Arts Federation
  - IMMAF 2015 Amateur Middleweight Championship
- Valor Fights
  - Valor Fights Middleweight Championship
- MMA Fighting
  - 2023 Third Team MMA All-Star

== Mixed martial arts record ==
Professional record breakdown
35 matches	28 wins	7 losses
By knockout	6	2
By submission	15	1
By decision	7	4

Res.	Record	Opponent	Method	Event	Date	Round	Time	Location	Notes
Win	28–7	Christian Leroy Duncan	Submission (rear-naked choke)	UFC Fight Night: Allen vs. Duncan	October 10, 2026	5	2:46	Las Vegas, Nevada, United States	Duncan was deducted one point in round 2 due to an eye poke. Performance of the Night.
Win	27–7	Edmen Shahbazyan	Decision (unanimous)	UFC Fight Night: Muhammad vs. Bonfim	June 6, 2026	3	5:00	Las Vegas, Nevada, United States	Fight of the Night.
Win	26–7	Reinier de Ridder	TKO (corner stoppage)	UFC Fight Night: de Ridder vs. Allen	October 18, 2025	4	5:00	Vancouver, British Columbia, Canada	
Win	25–7	Marvin Vettori	Decision (unanimous)	UFC 318	July 19, 2025	3	5:00	New Orleans, Louisiana, United States	Fight of the Night.
Loss	24–7	Anthony Hernandez	Decision (unanimous)	UFC Fight Night: Cejudo vs. Song	February 22, 2025	3	5:00	Seattle, Washington, United States	
Loss	24–6	Nassourdine Imavov	Decision (unanimous)	UFC Fight Night: Moicano vs. Saint Denis	September 28, 2024	3	5:00	Paris, France	
Win	24–5	Chris Curtis	Decision (split)	UFC Fight Night: Allen vs. Curtis 2	April 6, 2024	5	5:00	Las Vegas, Nevada, United States	
Win	23–5	Paul Craig	Submission (rear-naked choke)	UFC Fight Night: Allen vs. Craig	November 18, 2023	3	0:38	Las Vegas, Nevada, United States	Performance of the Night.
Win	22–5	Bruno Silva	Submission (rear-naked choke)	UFC on ABC: Emmett vs. Topuria	June 24, 2023	1	4:39	Jacksonville, Florida, United States	
Win	21–5	André Muniz	Submission (rear-naked choke)	UFC Fight Night: Muniz vs. Allen	February 25, 2023	3	4:25	Las Vegas, Nevada, United States	Performance of the Night.
Win	20–5	Krzysztof Jotko	Submission (rear-naked choke)	UFC Fight Night: Dern vs. Yan	October 1, 2022	1	4:17	Las Vegas, Nevada, United States	Performance of the Night.
Win	19–5	Jacob Malkoun	Decision (unanimous)	UFC 275	June 11, 2022	3	5:00	Kallang, Singapore	Return to Middleweight.
Win	18–5	Sam Alvey	Submission (rear-naked choke)	UFC Fight Night: Hermansson vs. Strickland	February 5, 2022	2	2:10	Las Vegas, Nevada, United States	Light Heavyweight debut.
Loss	17–5	Chris Curtis	TKO (punches and knees)	UFC on ESPN: Font vs. Aldo	December 4, 2021	2	1:58	Las Vegas, Nevada, United States	
Win	17–4	Punahele Soriano	Decision (unanimous)	UFC on ESPN: Sandhagen vs. Dillashaw	July 24, 2021	3	5:00	Las Vegas, Nevada, United States	
Win	16–4	Karl Roberson	Submission (ankle lock)	UFC 261	April 24, 2021	1	4:55	Jacksonville, Florida, United States	
Loss	15–4	Sean Strickland	TKO (punches)	UFC Fight Night: Felder vs. dos Anjos	November 14, 2020	2	1:32	Las Vegas, Nevada, United States	Catchweight (195 lb) bout.
Win	15–3	Kyle Daukaus	Decision (unanimous)	UFC on ESPN: Poirier vs. Hooker	June 27, 2020	3	5:00	Las Vegas, Nevada, United States	
Win	14–3	Tom Breese	TKO (elbows and punches)	UFC Fight Night: Benavidez vs. Figueiredo	February 29, 2020	1	4:47	Norfolk, Virginia, United States	
Win	13–3	Kevin Holland	Submission (rear-naked choke)	UFC on ESPN: Reyes vs. Weidman	October 18, 2019	2	3:38	Boston, Massachusetts, United States	
Win	12–3	Aaron Jeffery	Submission (rear-naked choke)	Dana White's Contender Series 20	July 16, 2019	1	3:23	Las Vegas, Nevada, United States	
Win	11–3	Moses Murrietta	Decision (unanimous)	LFA 61	February 22, 2019	5	5:00	Prior Lake, Minnesota, United States	Defended the LFA Middleweight Championship.
Win	10–3	Tim Hiley	Submission (rear-naked choke)	LFA 50	September 21, 2018	3	3:16	Prior Lake, Minnesota, United States	Won the vacant LFA Middleweight Championship.
Win	9–3	Larry Crowe	TKO (punches)	LFA 43	June 22, 2018	1	2:06	Beaumont, Texas, United States	
Loss	8–3	Anthony Hernandez	Decision (unanimous)	LFA 32	January 26, 2018	5	5:00	Lake Charles, Louisiana, United States	For the vacant LFA Middleweight Championship.
Win	8–2	Chris Harris	Submission (triangle choke)	LFA 18	August 4, 2017	2	1:22	Shawnee, Oklahoma, United States	
Loss	7–2	Eryk Anders	Decision (unanimous)	LFA 14	June 23, 2017	5	5:00	Houston, Texas, United States	For the inaugural LFA Middleweight Championship.
Win	7–1	Jon Kirk	TKO (punches)	LFA 3	February 10, 2017	1	2:46	Lake Charles, Louisiana, United States	
Win	6–1	Sidney Wheeler	Submission (keylock)	Valor Fights 3	December 2, 2016	2	0:29	Knoxville, Tennessee, United States	Won the Valor Fights Middleweight Championship.
Win	5–1	Matt Jones	Submission (rear-naked choke)	Mid City Fight Productions 2	September 23, 2016	1	3:34	Avondale, Louisiana, United States	
Win	4–1	Clovis Hancock	Submission (rear-naked choke)	Legacy FC 58	July 22, 2016	2	1:54	Lake Charles, Louisiana, United States	
Win	3–1	Charlie Rader	Submission (rear-naked choke)	World FC 52	May 14, 2016	1	3:26	Baton Rouge, Louisiana, United States	
Loss	2–1	Trevin Giles	Submission (rear-naked choke)	Legacy FC 52	March 25, 2016	2	1:47	Lake Charles, Louisiana, United States	
Win	2–0	Kory Moegenburg	TKO (punches)	World FC 46	January 9, 2016	1	4:03	Baton Rouge, Louisiana, United States	Middleweight debut.
Win	1–0	Zebulon Stroud	TKO (punches)	World FC 42	August 22, 2015	1	4:40	Baton Rouge, Louisiana, United States	Welterweight debut.

== See also ==
- List of current UFC fighters
- List of Dana White's Contender Series alumni
- List of male mixed martial artists
