= Dana White's Contender Series season 1 =

UFC mixed martial arts event in 2017

Dana White's Contender Series
- Season 1

Release
- Original network: UFC Fight Pass
- Original release: July 11 – August 29, 2017

Season chronology
- Next → Season 2

The inaugural 2017 season of Dana White's Contender Series included a total of 8 weekly shows. Viewers had a choice of a traditional commentary team, or alternate commentary provided by rapper Snoop Dogg and UFC Hall of Famer Urijah Faber. Commentators included active fighter Paul Felder who would go on to commentate on UFC events.

== Week 1 - July 11 ==
Dana White's Tuesday Night Contender Series 1
- Promotion: DWCS
- Date: July 11, 2017
- Venue: UFC Training Centre
- City: Las Vegas, Nevada, United States

Main Card
Weight class				Method	Round	Time	Notes
Featherweight	Kurt Holobaugh	vs.	Matt Bessette	NC (overturned by NSAC)	1	2:59	(Note: Originally a KO (punch) win for Holobaugh, overturned after Holobaugh's unlawful use of an IV before fight.)
Heavyweight	Zu Anyanwu	def.	Greg Rebello	KO (punch)	2	3:04
Bantamweight	Boston Salmon	def.	Ricky Turcios	Decision (unanimous) (30–27, 30–27, 29–28)	3	5:00
Middleweight	Charles Byrd	def.	Jamie Pickett	Technical Submission (arm-triangle choke)	1	4:55
Flyweight	Joby Sanchez	def.	Manny Vazquez	Decision (unanimous) (29–27, 29–27, 29–27)	3	5:00

=== Contract awards ===
The following fighters were awarded contracts with the UFC:

- Kurt Holobaugh and Boston Salmon
- Zu Anyanwu while not being offered a contract on the show was brought in as a short-notice replacement for Justin Ledet at UFC Fight Night 116.

== Week 2 - July 18 ==
Dana White's Tuesday Night Contender Series 2
- Promotion: DWCS
- Date: July 18, 2017
- Venue: UFC Training Centre
- City: Las Vegas, Nevada, United States

Main Card
Weight class				Method	Round	Time	Notes
Light Heavyweight	Daniel Spohn	def.	Angel DeAnda	Submission (arm-triangle choke)	1	3:10	(Note: DeAnda was deducted one point in round 1 due to strikes to the back of the head.)
Bantamweight	Sean O'Malley	def.	Alfred Khashakyan	KO (punch)	1	4:14
Featherweight	Thanh Le	def.	Lazar Stojadinovic	KO (head kick and punches)	2	1:35
Welterweight	Sidney Outlaw	def.	Michael Cora	Decision (unanimous) (29–27, 29–27, 29–28)	3	5:00
Flyweight	Casey Kenney	def.	C.J. Hamilton	Decision (unanimous) (30–27, 30–27, 30–27)	3	5:00

=== Contract awards ===
The following fighters were awarded contracts with the UFC:

- Sean O'Malley

== Week 3 - July 25 ==
Dana White's Tuesday Night Contender Series 3
- Promotion: DWCS
- Date: July 25, 2017
- Venue: UFC Training Centre
- City: Las Vegas, Nevada, United States

Main Card
Weight class				Method	Round	Time	Notes
Light Heavyweight	Karl Roberson	def.	Ryan Spann	KO (elbows)	1	0:15
Welterweight	Kyle Stewart	def.	Jason Jackson	TKO (ankle injury)	2	0:21
Middleweight	Geoff Neal	def.	Chase Waldon	TKO (punches)	1	1:56
Light Heavyweight	Alonzo Menifield	def.	Daniel Jolly	TKO (eye injury)	1	5:00
Featherweight	Dan Ige	def.	Luis Gomez	Submission (rear-naked choke)	3	3:23

=== Contract awards ===
The following fighters were awarded contracts with the UFC:

- Karl Roberson and Geoff Neal
- Dan Ige while not being offered a contract on the show was brought in to face Charles Rosa, who was later replaced by Julio Arce at UFC 220.

== Week 4 - August 1 ==
Dana White's Tuesday Night Contender Series 4
- Promotion: DWCS
- Date: August 1, 2017
- Venue: UFC Training Centre
- City: Las Vegas, Nevada, United States

Main Card
Weight class				Method	Round	Time	Notes
Middleweight	Julian Marquez	def.	Phil Hawes	KO (head kick)	2	2:20
Bantamweight	Kyler Phillips	def.	James Gray	TKO (elbows and punches)	1	0:46
Flyweight	Carlos Candelario	def.	Ronaldo Candido	Decision (unanimous) (29–28, 29–28, 29–28)	3	5:00
Featherweight	Brandon Davis	def.	Austin Arnett	Decision (unanimous) (29–28, 30–27, 30–26)	3	5:00
Bantamweight	John Castañeda	def.	Cheyden Leialoha	Decision (unanimous) (29–28, 29–28, 29–28)	3	5:00

=== Contract awards ===
The following fighters were awarded contracts with the UFC:

- Julian Marquez and Brandon Davis
- Kyler Phillips while not being offered a contract on the show was brought in to compete on The Ultimate Fighter: Undefeated.

== Week 5 - August 8 ==
Dana White's Tuesday Night Contender Series 5
- Promotion: DWCS
- Date: August 8, 2017
- Venue: UFC Training Centre
- City: Las Vegas, Nevada, United States

Main Card
Weight class				Method	Round	Time	Notes
Light Heavyweight	Mike Rodríguez	def.	Jamelle Jones	KO (flying knee)	1	2:15
Featherweight	Julio Arce	def.	Peter Petties	TKO (punches)	2	2:39
Flyweight	Alex Perez	def.	Kevin Gray	Technical Submission (anaconda choke)	1	2:54
Bantamweight	Ricky Simón	def.	Donavon Frelow	Decision (split) (29–28, 28–29, 29–28)	3	5:00
Heavyweight	Shelton Graves	def.	Everett Sims	TKO (knees to the body)	3	2:20

=== Contract awards ===
The following fighters were awarded contracts with the UFC:

- Mike Rodríguez and Alex Perez
- Julio Arce while not being offered a contract on the show was brought in as a short-notice replacement for Dan Ige at UFC 220.

== Week 6 - August 15 ==
Dana White's Tuesday Night Contender Series 6
- Promotion: DWCS
- Date: August 15, 2017
- Venue: UFC Training Centre
- City: Las Vegas, Nevada, United States

Main Card
Weight class				Method	Round	Time	Notes
Middleweight	Charles Byrd	def.	Buddy Wallace	Submission (rear-naked choke)	2	2:03
Featherweight	Grant Dawson	def.	Adrian Diaz	Submission (rear-naked choke)	2	1:15
Light Heavyweight	Cameron Olson	def.	Karl Reed	Decision (unanimous) (29–28, 29–28, 29–28)	3	5:00
Flyweight	Jaime Alvarez	def.	Martin Day	Decision (unanimous) (28–27, 29–28, 29–27)	3	5:00
Women's Strawweight	Jamie Colleen	def.	Tiffany Masters	Submission (armbar)	3	4:43

=== Contract awards ===
The following fighters were awarded contracts with the UFC:

- Charles Byrd and Grant Dawson

== Week 7 - August 22 ==
Dana White's Tuesday Night Contender Series 7
- Promotion: DWCS
- Date: August 22, 2017
- Venue: UFC Training Centre
- City: Las Vegas, Nevada, United States

Main Card
Weight class				Method	Round	Time	Notes
Light Heavyweight	Kennedy Nzechukwu	def.	Anton Berzin	Decision (split) (29–27, 28–29, 29–27)	3	5:00
Bantamweight	Benito Lopez	def.	Steven Peterson	Decision (split) (29–28, 28–29, 29–28)	3	5:00
Flyweight	Joby Sanchez	def.	JP Buys	TKO (punches)	2	2:28
Lightweight	Mike Santiago	def.	Mark Cherico	KO (punches)	1	2:59
Flyweight	Jordan Espinosa	def.	Nick Urso	Technical Submission (anaconda choke)	1	1:23

=== Contract awards ===
The following fighters were awarded contracts with the UFC:

- Benito Lopez and Joby Sanchez
- Mike Santiago was not awarded a contract on the show but one week later was signed to the UFC as a short notice replacement for Nick Hein at UFC Fight Night 115

== Week 8 - August 29 ==
Dana White's Tuesday Night Contender Series 8
- Promotion: DWCS
- Date: August 29, 2017
- Venue: UFC Training Centre
- City: Las Vegas, Nevada, United States

Main Card
Weight class				Method	Round	Time	Notes
Lightweight	Matt Frevola	def.	Jose Flores	Submission (arm-triangle choke)	2	3:32
Middleweight	Bevon Lewis	def.	Elias Urbina	TKO (punches)	2	2:47
Flyweight	Adam Antolin	def.	Casey Kenney	Decision (split) (29–28, 28–29, 29–28)	3	5:00
Women's Bantamweight	Lauren Mueller	def.	Kelly McGill	Decision (unanimous) (30–27, 30–27, 30–26)	3	5:00
Heavyweight	Allen Crowder	def.	Don'Tale Mayes	TKO (punches and elbows)	3	4:12

=== Contract awards ===
The following fighters were awarded contracts with the UFC:

- Matt Frevola, Lauren Mueller, and Allen Crowder
- Bevon Lewis was signed to a development league contract
