= Charles Byrd (fighter) =

American mixed martial arts fighter

- Born: Charles Dewayne Byrd Jr. October 11, 1983 (age 43); Pine Bluff, Arkansas, United States
- Other names: Kid Dynamite
- Height: 5 ft 10 in (1.78 m)
- Weight: 185 lb (84 kg; 13 st 3 lb)
- Division: Middleweight; Welterweight
- Reach: 73 in (185 cm)
- Fighting out of: Plano, Texas, United States
- Team: Fortis MMA
- Years active: 2009–2020

Mixed martial arts record
- Total: 17
- Wins: 10
- By knockout: 3
- By submission: 5
- By decision: 2
- Losses: 7
- By knockout: 3
- By submission: 2
- By decision: 1
- Unknown: 1

Other information
- Mixed martial arts record from Sherdog

Charles Dewayne Byrd Jr. (born October 11, 1983) is an American retired mixed martial artist. A professional from 2009 until 2020, Byrd competed in the Ultimate Fighting Championship and Legacy FC.

== Background ==
Byrd was born in Pine Bluff, Arkansas, and grew up in Texas. He attended Arlington High School and competed in wrestling and played football during his high school years.

== Mixed martial arts career ==
=== Early career ===
After a 2–0 amateur career, Byrd began his professional career in 2009 and fought under various promotions, notably Legacy Fighting Championship. He amassed a record of 7–4 before joined Dana White's Contender Series.

=== Dana White's Contender Series ===
Byrd appeared in Dana White's Tuesday Night Contender Series Dana White's Contender Series 1 web-series program on July 11, 2017, facing Jamie Pickett. He won the fight via a technical submission in round one but failed to secure a contract with UFC.

Byrd had his second chance at Dana White's Contender Series 6 on August 15, 2017 against Randall Wallace. He won via a submission in round two and with the win, he was signed by UFC.

=== Ultimate Fighting Championship ===
Byrd made his UFC debut on March 17, 2018 against John Phillips at UFC Fight Night: Werdum vs. Volkov. He won the fight via submission with a rear-naked choke in round one.

His next fight came on September 8, 2018 against Darren Stewart at UFC 228. He lost the fight via technical knockout in round two.

Byrd faced Edmen Shahbazyan on March 2, 2019 at UFC 235. He lost the fight via technical knockout in round one.

After a 15-month layoff, Byrd returned to face Maki Pitolo at UFC 250 on June 6, 2020. He lost the bout via second round technical knockout, announcing his retirement after the event.

== Mixed martial arts record ==
Professional record breakdown
17 matches	10 wins	7 losses
By knockout	3	3
By submission	5	2
By decision	2	1
By disqualification	0	1

Res.	Record	Opponent	Method	Event	Date	Round	Time	Location	Notes
Loss	10–7	Maki Pitolo	TKO (punches)	UFC 250	June 6, 2020	2	1:10	Las Vegas, Nevada, United States	
Loss	10–6	Edmen Shahbazyan	TKO (elbows and punches)	UFC 235	March 2, 2019	1	0:38	Las Vegas, Nevada, United States	
Loss	10–5	Darren Stewart	TKO (punches and elbows)	UFC 228	September 8, 2018	2	2:17	Dallas, Texas, United States	
Win	10–4	John Phillips	Submission (rear-naked choke)	UFC Fight Night: Werdum vs. Volkov	March 17, 2018	1	3:58	London, England	
Win	9–4	Randall Wallace	Submission (rear-naked choke)	Dana White's Contender Series 6	August 15, 2017	2	2:03	Las Vegas, Nevada, United States	
Win	8–4	Jamie Pickett	Technical Submission (arm-triangle choke)	Dana White's Contender Series 1	July 11, 2017	1	4:55	Las Vegas, Nevada, United States	
Win	7–4	Quentin Henry	TKO (punches)	Legacy FC 57	July 1, 2016	1	2:50	Bossier City, Louisiana, United States	Return to Middleweight.
Loss	6–4	Bojan Veličković	Decision (unanimous)	AXS TV Fights: RFA vs. Legacy Superfight	February 13, 2015	3	5:00	Robinsonville, Mississippi, United States	
Win	6–3	Evan Thompson	TKO (punches)	Legacy FC 38	February 13, 2015	1	4:51	Allen, Texas, United States	Middleweight bout.
Win	5–3	Mike Jasper	Decision (split)	Legacy FC 24	October 11, 2013	3	5:00	Dallas, Texas, United States	Welterweight debut.
Loss	4–3	Derrick Krantz	Submission (rear-naked choke)	Legacy FC 16	December 14, 2012	1	3:02	Dallas, Texas, United States	Catchweight (172.5 lbs) bout; Byrd missed weight.
Win	4–2	Ira Boyd	Submission (arm-triangle choke)	Dominion Warrior Tri Combat	April 28, 2012	1	2:11	Plano, Texas, United States	
Win	3–2	Robert Agee	Decision (unanimous)	Fight Game: Premier Event	December 2, 2011	3	3:00	Frisco, Texas, United States	
Win	2–2	Gabriel Vasquez	Submission (neck crank)	24/7 Entertainment 2	June 10, 2011	1	2:15	Amarillo, Texas, United States	
Loss	1–2	Marcelo Azevedo	Submission (rear-naked choke)	Legacy Promotions	March 20, 2010	1	2:04	Houston, Texas, United States	
Win	1–1	Chris Trammel	TKO (punches)	KOK 7	August 29, 2009	1	1:27	Austin, Texas, United States	
Loss	0–1	Donyiell Winrow	DQ (knee to downed opponent)	Dominant Knockout 1	April 25, 2009	1	2:48	Irving, Texas, United States	

== See also ==
- List of male mixed martial artists
