= UFC on ESPN: dos Anjos vs. Fiziev =

Mixed martial arts event in 2022

- The poster for UFC on ESPN: dos Anjos vs. Fiziev
- Promotion: Ultimate Fighting Championship
- Date: July 9, 2022
- Venue: UFC Apex
- City: Enterprise, Nevada, United States
- Attendance: Not announced

Event chronology
UFC 276: Adesanya vs. Cannonier	UFC on ESPN: dos Anjos vs. Fiziev	UFC on ABC: Ortega vs. Rodríguez

UFC on ESPN: dos Anjos vs. Fiziev (also known as UFC on ESPN 39 and UFC Vegas 58) was a mixed martial arts event produced by the Ultimate Fighting Championship that took place on July 9, 2022, at the UFC Apex facility in Enterprise, Nevada, part of the Las Vegas Metropolitan Area, United States.

== Background ==
A lightweight bout between former UFC Lightweight Champion Rafael dos Anjos and Rafael Fiziev headlined the event. They were previously scheduled to headline UFC Fight Night: Walker vs. Hill, but the bout was postponed to UFC 272 due to visa issues with Fiziev. Fiziev was once again forced to withdraw as he tested positive for COVID-19 a week before that event.

A women's flyweight bout between Antonina Shevchenko and Cortney Casey took place at this event. The pairing was previously scheduled to meet at UFC on ESPN: Font vs. Vera, but the bout was postponed to this event due to Shevchenko injuring her knee in training.

A middleweight bout between Josh Fremd and Tresean Gore was scheduled for the event. However, Fremd was pulled from the fight due to injury and replaced by Cody Brundage.

Former UFC Bantamweight Champion Cody Garbrandt and Rani Yahya were expected to meet in a bantamweight bout. However, Yahya withdrew in mid June due to a neck injury and the bout was scrapped.

A middleweight bout between Jamie Pickett and Abdul Razak Alhassan was scheduled for this event. However, Alhassan pulled out of the bout and was replaced by Denis Tiuliulin. The bout was removed from the card for undisclosed reasons and moved to UFC 279.

Sijara Eubanks was scheduled to face Maryna Moroz in a women's flyweight bout at this event. However, the pair was moved to UFC Fight Night 210 due to undisclosed reasons.

A featherweight bout between Austin Lingo and David Onama was scheduled for the event. Lingo pulled out during fight week and was replaced by promotional newcomer Garrett Armfield.

A women's flyweight bout between Cynthia Calvillo and Nina Nunes was expected to take place at the event. However, the day of the event, Nunes withdrew due to illness and the bout was canceled.

Charly Arnolt debuted as an interviewer at the event.

== Results ==
Main card (ESPN / ESPN+)
Weight class				Method	Round	Time	Notes
Lightweight	Rafael Fiziev	def.	Rafael dos Anjos	KO (punches)	5	0:18
Middleweight	Caio Borralho	def.	Armen Petrosyan	Decision (unanimous) (30–27, 30–27, 29–28)	3	5:00
Bantamweight	Said Nurmagomedov	def.	Douglas Silva de Andrade	Decision (unanimous) (30–27, 29–28, 29–28)	3	5:00
Heavyweight	Chase Sherman	def.	Jared Vanderaa	TKO (punches)	3	3:10
Bantamweight	Aiemann Zahabi	def.	Ricky Turcios	Decision (unanimous) (29–28, 29–28, 29–28)	3	5:00
Lightweight	Jamie Mullarkey	def.	Michael Johnson	Decision (split) (28–29, 29–28, 29–28)	3	5:00
Preliminary card (ESPN / ESPN+)
Middleweight	Cody Brundage	def.	Tresean Gore	KO (punches)	1	3:50
Women's Flyweight	Antonina Shevchenko	def.	Cortney Casey	Decision (split) (29–28, 28–29, 29–28)	3	5:00
Featherweight	David Onama	def.	Garrett Armfield	Technical Submission (arm-triangle choke)	2	3:13
Light Heavyweight	Kennedy Nzechukwu	def.	Karl Roberson	TKO (elbows)	3	2:19
Bantamweight	Saidyokub Kakhramonov	def.	Ronnie Lawrence	Decision (unanimous) (30–26, 30–27, 30–27)	3	5:00

== Bonus awards ==
The following fighters received $50,000 bonuses.

- Fight of the Night: Jamie Mullarkey vs. Michael Johnson
- Performance of the Night: Rafael Fiziev and Chase Sherman

== See also ==
- List of UFC events
- List of current UFC fighters
- 2022 in UFC
