= John Phillips (fighter) =

Welsh mixed martial arts fighter

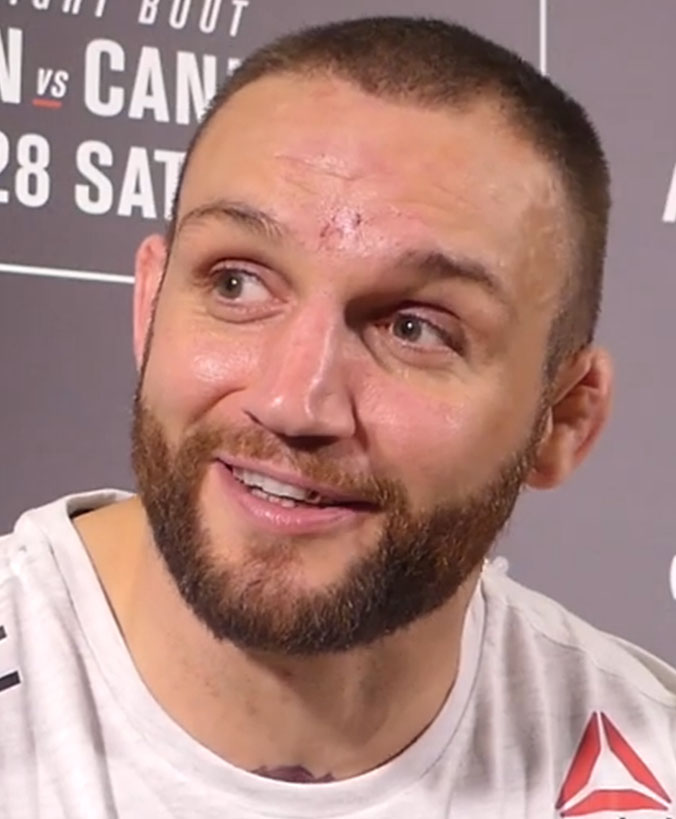
- John Phillips at UFC Fight Night 160 in Copenhagen
- Born: 9 June 1985 (age 41); Swansea, Wales, UK
- Other names: The Welsh Wrecking Machine
- Height: 5 ft 11 in (1.80 m)
- Weight: 185 lb (84 kg; 13 st 3 lb)
- Division: Middleweight
- Reach: 75 in (191 cm)
- Stance: Southpaw
- Fighting out of: Swansea, Wales, UK
- Team: Straight Blast Gym - Ireland
- Years active: 2005–present

Mixed martial arts record
- Total: 34
- Wins: 22
- By knockout: 20
- By submission: 2
- Losses: 11
- By knockout: 2
- By submission: 6
- By decision: 3
- No contests: 1

Other information
- University
- Mixed martial arts record from Sherdog

John Phillips (born 9 June 1985) is a Welsh Middleweight bare-knuckle boxer. He is also a former mixed martial artist. A professional since 2005, he has also competed for BAMMA, Cage Rage, Ultimate Fighting Championship, and Cage Warriors. He is the former BAMMA Middleweight Champion.

== Career ==
Phillips faced Jesse Taylor for the latter's first defense of the Cage Warriors Middleweight on 4 May 2013 on the Cage Warriors 54 card. Phillips lost to Taylor via submission early in the first round.

His next fight came on 17 March 2018 at UFC Fight Night: Werdum vs. Volkov against Charles Byrd, where both fighters made their UFC debut. He lost the fight via a submission due to a rear-naked choke in round three.

Phillips faced Kevin Holland on 1 June 2018 at UFC Fight Night: Blaydes vs. Ngannou 2. Phillips lost the fight via submission late in round three.

Phillips faced fellow Welshman Jack Marshman on 16 March 2019 at UFC on ESPN+ 5 At the weigh-ins, Marshman weighed in at 188 lbs, 2 pounds over the middleweight non-title fight limit of 186 lbs. He was fined 20% of his fight purse and the bout proceeded at catchweight. Phillips lost the bout via split decision.

In his next fight Phillips faced Alen Amedovski at UFC Fight Night: Hermansson vs. Cannonier on 28 September 2019. He won via knockout in 17 seconds of the first round. This was his first win in the UFC and earned him the $50,000 performance of the night bonus.

Phillips was scheduled to face Duško Todorović on 21 March 2020 at UFC Fight Night: Woodley vs. Edwards. Due to the COVID-19 pandemic travel bans, the bout was moved to Cage Warriors 113 but was later on removed from the card due to Todorović's travel restrictions.

Phillips was expected to face Duško Todorović on 16 July 2020 at UFC Fight Night: Kattar vs. Ige. On 8 July Todorović pulled out due to a potential medical issue. He was replaced by promotional newcomer Khamzat Chimaev. Phillips lost the fight via submission in round two.

Phillips faced Jun Yong Park on 18 October 2020 at UFC Fight Night 180. He lost the fight via unanimous decision.

On 13 November 2020 it was announced that Phillips had been released from the UFC.

== Bare-knuckle boxing ==
Phillips made his Bare Knuckle Fighting Championship debut against Fábio Maldonado on 5 April 2025 at BKFC 72 Dubai: Day 2. After landing a second knockdown, he won the fight by knockout in the second round.

Phillips faced Ryan Barrett on 30 May 2026 at BKFC 90. He won the fight by knockout in the first round.

== Championships and accomplishments ==
=== Mixed martial arts ===
- Ultimate Fighting Championship
  - Performance of the Night (One time) vs. Alen Amedovski
- BAMMA
  - BAMMA Middleweight Champion (One time)
- Rage in the Cage
  - Rage in the Cage Middleweight Tournament Winner (One time)

== Mixed martial arts record ==
Professional record breakdown
34 matches	22 wins	11 losses
By knockout	20	2
By submission	2	6
By decision	0	3
No contests	1	

Res.	Record	Opponent	Method	Event	Date	Round	Time	Location	Notes
Loss	22–11 (1)	Jun Yong Park	Decision (unanimous)	UFC Fight Night: Ortega vs. The Korean Zombie	17 October 2020	3	5:00	Abu Dhabi, United Arab Emirates	
Loss	22–10 (1)	Khamzat Chimaev	Submission (D'Arce choke)	UFC on ESPN: Kattar vs. Ige	16 July 2020	2	1:12	Abu Dhabi, United Arab Emirates	
Win	22–9 (1)	Alen Amedovski	KO (punches)	UFC Fight Night: Hermansson vs. Cannonier	28 September 2019	1	0:17	Copenhagen, Denmark	Performance of the Night.
Loss	21–9 (1)	Jack Marshman	Decision (split)	UFC Fight Night: Till vs. Masvidal	16 March 2019	3	5:00	London, England	Catchweight (188 lb) bout; Marshman missed weight.
Loss	21–8 (1)	Kevin Holland	Submission (rear-naked choke)	UFC Fight Night: Blaydes vs. Ngannou 2	28 September 2018	3	4:05	Beijing, China	
Loss	21–7 (1)	Charles Byrd	Submission (rear-naked choke)	UFC Fight Night: Werdum vs. Volkov	17 March 2018	1	3:58	London, England	
Win	21–6 (1)	Jose Otavio dos Santos Lacerda	KO (punch)	Budo FC 16	24 September 2016	1	4:44	Swansea, Wales	Catchweight (198 lb) bout.
Win	20–6 (1)	Cheick Kone	TKO (punch)	BAMMA 24	27 February 2016	1	1:05	Dublin, Ireland	Won the BAMMA World Middleweight Championship.
Win	19–6 (1)	Markus Di Gallo	KO (punch)	Fightstar Promotions: Rage in the Cage 3	21 March 2015	1	N/A	Paisley, Scotland	Won the RITC Middleweight Tournament.
Win	18–6 (1)	Charlie Ward	KO (punch)	Fightstar Promotions: Rage in the Cage 3	21 March 2015	2	N/A	Paisley, Scotland	RITC Middleweight Tournament Quarterfinal.
Loss	17–6 (1)	Jesse Taylor	Submission (guillotine choke)	Cage Warriors 54	4 May 2013	1	1:23	Cardiff, Wales	For the Cage Warriors Middleweight Championship.
Win	17–5 (1)	Chris Fields	Submission (guillotine choke)	Cage Warriors 48	21 July 2012	2	2:04	London, England	Catchweight (192 lb) bout.
Win	16–5 (1)	Tomas Penz	Submission (triangle choke)	Cage Warriors: Fight Night 6	24 May 2012	2	3:21	Isa Town, Bahrain	
Loss	15–5 (1)	Pavel Kusch	Submission (heel hook)	Cage Warriors: Fight Night 5	12 April 2012	1	0:25	Amman, Jordan	
Win	15–4 (1)	Matt Ewin	TKO (injury)	KnuckleUp MMA 8	29 October 2011	1	0:56	Kingston upon Hull, England	
Loss	14–4 (1)	Frank Trigg	TKO (doctor stoppage)	BAMMA 6	21 May 2011	1	2:41	London, England	
Win	14–3 (1)	James Zikic	TKO (punches)	BAMMA 4	25 September 2010	1	1:34	Birmingham, England	
Win	13–3 (1)	Johnny Gillan	TKO (punches)	Fight UK 1	2 May 2010	1	1:37	Leicester, England	
Win	12–3 (1)	Marius Liaukevicius	TKO (punches)	Celtic Fight Night 3	6 March 2010	1	0:15	Brecon, Wales	
Win	11–3 (1)	Danny Welsh	TKO (punches to the body)	Trojan MMA: Trojan Warfare	27 February 2010	1	0:36	Exeter, Wales	
Win	10–3 (1)	Matt Thorpe	TKO (punches)	KnuckleUp MMA 4	20 February 2010	1	0:50	Cheltenham, Wales	
Loss	9–3 (1)	Denniston Sutherland	TKO (submission to punches)	BAMMA 1	27 June 2009	1	3:32	London, England	
Win	9–2 (1)	Bohumil Lungrik	TKO (punches)	World Freefight Challenge 8	18 April 2009	1	3:15	Ljubljana, Slovenia	
Win	8–2 (1)	Tommy Gunn	TKO (punches)	Predator Fight Night 1	9 November 2008	1	0:44	Swansea, Wales	
Win	7–2 (1)	Jake Bostwick	TKO (submission to punches)	Cage Rage 28	9 November 2008	2	2:47	London, England	
Loss	6–2 (1)	Tom Watson	Decision (unanimous)	Cage Rage 27	12 July 2008	3	5:00	London, England	
NC	6–1 (1)	Jake Bostwick	No Contest	Cage Rage 25	8 March 2008	1	4:10	London, England	
Win	6–1	Christos Petroutsos	TKO (punches)	Cage Rage Contenders: Wales	18 November 2007	1	N/A	Swansea, Wales	
Win	5–1	Mihaly Dobrai	KO	MedVid: Anno Domini 1	9 June 2007	N/A	N/A	Pula, Croatia	
Win	4–1	Mario Valentic	TKO (punches)	MedVid: Anno Domini 2	27 January 2007	N/A	N/A	Pula, Croatia	
Win	3–1	Edgaras Pilvinis	TKO (referee stoppage)	Cage Gladiators 3	3 December 2006	1	0:34	Liverpool, England	
Win	2–1	Gary Savage	TKO (punches)	House of Pain 7	26 November 2006	1	1:23	Swansea, Wales	
Loss	1–1	Jim Wallhead	TKO (elbows)	House of Pain: Fight Night 5	9 April 2006	1	1:41	Swansea, Wales	
Win	1–0	Nigel Whitear	KO	House of Pain 3	24 July 2005	1	0:57	Swansea, Wales	Middleweight debut.

== Bare knuckle boxing record ==
Professional record breakdown
2 matches	2 wins	0 losses
By knockout	2	0

Res.	Record	Opponent	Method	Event	Date	Round	Time	Location	Notes
Win	2–0	Ryan Barrett	KO (punch)	BKFC 90	30 May 2026	1	1:03	Birmingham, England	
Win	1–0	Fábio Maldonado	KO (punch)	BKFC 72 Dubai: Day 2	5 April 2025	2	0:29	Dubai, United Arab Emirates	

== See also ==
- List of male mixed martial artists
