= Serdar Yiğit Eroğlu =

Turkish kickboxer (born 1995)

- Born: 1995 (age 30–31); Gaziantep, Turkey
- Other names: The Killer
- Height: 186 cm (6 ft 1 in)
- Weight: 100 kg (220 lb; 16 st)
- Style: Kickboxing, Muay Thai
- Fighting out of: Istanbul, Turkey
- Team: FFC
- Trainer: Cevat Alibeyoğulları

Kickboxing record
- Total: 31
- Wins: 27
- By knockout: 10
- Losses: 4
- By knockout: 0
- Last updated on: October 28, 2026

Serdar Yiğit Eroğlu (born 1995) is a Turkish kickboxer.

As of January 2022, he was the No. 10 ranked middleweight kickboxer in the world by Beyond Kick.

== Career ==
Eroğlu was scheduled to face Santino Verbeek on September 29, 2018. He won the fight by decision.

On November 3, 2018, Eroğlu faced Ehsan Vafae. He defeated him by technical knockout in the second round.

Eroglu faced Sergey Ponomarev at Ural FC 1 on July 1, 2022. He lost the fight by unanimous decision.

On October 8, 2022, Eroğlu faced Ruben Lee at the BKK World Kickboxing Championships in Dubai for the inaugural 90 kg title. He won the fight by unanimous decision.

On February 11, 2026, Eroğlu stepped in as last minute replacement against Vasile Amaritei at Glory 105 in the reserve bout for the Last Heavyweight Standing 8-man tournament. He won the bout by unanimous decision. Eroğlu was offered to fight in the final against Mory Kromah after his opponent Miloš Cvjetićanin was deemed unable to continue by the medical team. Eroğlu refused to get back into the ring, evoking the fury of Glory CEO Marshall Zelaznik: "It is very disappointing that reserves are not doing what we pay them to do. We will never see those reserves here again."

== Titles and accomplishments ==
=== Professional ===
- Bare Knuckle Kombat Kickboxing Championship
  - 2022 BKK World Kickboxing −90 kg Champion

Awards

- 2022 Glove Awards Turkish Male Athlete of the Year

=== Amateur ===
- World Association of Kickboxing Organizations
  - 2013 WAKO European Championship Junior Full Contact −86 kg (bronze)
  - 2014 WAKO European Championship Full Contact −86 kg (gold)
  - 2016 WAKO European Championship Full Contact −86 kg (bronze)
  - 2017 WAKO World Championship Full Contact −91 kg (bronze)
- International Federation of Muaythai Associations
  - 2017 IFMA World Championships −91 kg (gold)
  - 2017 IFMA European Championships −91 kg (silver)
  - 2018 IFMA World Championships −86 kg (bronze)
  - 2018 IFMA-FISU World Championships −91 kg (silver)
  - 2022 IFMA World Championships −86 kg (bronze)

== Fight record ==
Professional kickboxing record
27 wins (10 (T)KOs), 4 losses
Date	Result	Opponent	Event	Location	Method	Round	Time
2026-10-28	Loss	(Romania) Cristian Ristea	Colosseum Tournament 51	Bucharest, Romania	Decision	3	3:00
Colosseum Tournament World Heavyweight Title Eliminator.
2026-08-14	Win	(Netherlands) Maikel Frank	Akpolat Fight Night 4	Istanbul, Turkey	Decision (unanimous)	3	3:00
2026-02-07	Win	(Romania) Vasile Amariței	Glory 105 - Last Heavyweight Standing Finals Tournament, reserve	Arnhem, Netherlands	Decision (unanimous)	3	3:00
2025-12-06	Win	(Romania) Vasile Amariței	International Fight Show	Loano, Italy	Decision (unanimous)	3	3:00
2024-08-10	Win	(Iran) Reza Hazi	Alkayis Fighting Championship 11	Mersin, Turkey	KO (low kicks)	2	
2024-05-31	Win	(France) Aristote Quitusisa	Alkayis Fighting Championship 10	Istanbul, Turkey	Ext.R decision (unanimous)	4	3:00
2023-03-30	Loss	(Moldova) Maxim Zaplitnî	FEA Legacy, Final	Ciorescu, Moldova	Decision (unanimous)	3	3:00
2023-03-30	Win	(Romania) Vasile Amariței	FEA Legacy, Semifinals	Ciorescu, Moldova	Decision (split)	3	3:00
2022-12-23	Win	(Russia) Gadzhimurad Amirzhanov	FKR PRO 2	Moscow, Russia	Ext.R decision	4	3:00
2022-10-08	Win	(Spain) Ruben Lee	BKK World Kickboxing Championship	Dubai, United Arab Emirates	Decision (unanimous)	3	3:00
Wins the inaugural BKK World Kickboxing −90kg title.
2022-07-01	Loss	(Russia) Sergey Ponomarev	Ural FC 1	Perm, Russia	Decision (unanimous)	3	3:00
2022-05-22	Win	(Moldova) Denis Cvasnitchi	FFC 6	Alanya, Turkey	Decision (unanimous)	3	3:00
2022-03-05	Win	(Switzerland) Yanis Rauch	FFC Superfights 2	İzmir, Turkey	TKO (referee stoppage)	1	2:41
2021-12-19	Win	(Russia) Alexandr Golovachev	FFC	Alanya, Turkey	KO (knee to the head)	1	2:40
2021-10-08	Win	(Netherlands) Leandro Dikmoet	FFC	Alanya, Turkey	TKO (punches)	3	
2021-06-30	Win	(Turkey) Cengaver Taylan Kemik	Star Fight Arena	Adana, Turkey	Decision (unanimous)	3	3:00
2019-11-16	Win	(Iran) Ali Takloo	ÖNCÜ FIGHT CLUB	Istanbul, Turkey	Decision	3	3:00
2019-09-01	Win	(Iran) Omid Nosrati	YOKUŞ FIGHT ARENA	Çorlu, Turkey	Decision (unanimous)	3	3:00
2019-04-27	Win	(Netherlands) Andelko Zlatic	ÖNCÜ FIGHT CLUB	Malatya, Turkey	Decision (unanimous)	3	3:00
2019-02-16	Win	(Iran) Arman Bazyari	Akin Dovus Arenasi	Turkey	Decision (unanimous)	3	3:00
2019-02-08	Win	(Germany) Florian Kroger	Star Fight Arena	Adana, Turkey	Decision (unanimous)	3	3:00
2018-11-03	Win	(Afghanistan) Ehsan Vafae	Star Fight Arena	Adana, Turkey	TKO (leg injury)	2	1:31
2018-09-29	Win	(Netherlands) Santino Verbeek	ÖNCÜ FIGHT CLUB	Malatya, Turkey	Decision	3	3:00
2017-11-24	Win	(Bosnia and Herzegovina) Muhamad Mahmić	ÖNCÜ FIGHT CLUB	Turkey	KO (low kick)	1	
2016-04-30	Loss	(Netherlands) Thomas Bridgewater	ÖNCÜ FIGHT CLUB	Istanbul, Turkey	Decision	3	3:00
2016-02-27	Win	(Turkey)		Istanbul, Turkey	Decision	3	3:00
Legend: Win Loss Draw/no contest Notes

Amateur Muay Thai & kickboxing record
Date	Result	Opponent	Event	Location	Method	Round	Time
2023-03-17	Loss	(Turkey) Muammer Can Şahin	2023 Turkish Muay Thai Championships, Quarter-finals	Ankara, Turkey	Decision (30:27)	3	3:00
2022-06-02	Loss	(United States) Aaron Ortiz	2022 IFMA World Championships, Semi-finals	Abu Dhabi, United Arab Emirates	Decision (29:28)	3	3:00
Wins 2022 IFMA World Championships −86kg Bronze Medal.
2022-05-31	Win	(Greece) Kyriakos Bakirtzis	2022 IFMA World Championships, Quarter Finals	Abu Dhabi, United Arab Emirates	Decision (30:27)	3	3:00
2022-05-28	Win	(France) Reda Oudgou	2022 IFMA World Championships, First Round	Abu Dhabi, United Arab Emirates	Decision (30:27)	3	3:00
2022-03-31	Win	(Turkey) Hasan Mert Müjdeci	2022 Turkish Muay Thai Championships, Final	Kemer, Turkey	Decision	3	3:00
Wins 2022 Turkish Muay Thai Championships −86kg Gold Medal.
2022-03-30	Win	(Turkey) Ömer Faruk Kaya	2022 Turkish Muay Thai Championships, Semi-final	Kemer, Turkey	Decision	3	3:00
2022-03-29	Win	(Turkey) Hüseyin Keloğlu	2022 Turkish Muay Thai Championships, Quarter Final	Kemer, Turkey	Decision	3	3:00
2021-12-08	Loss	(Ukraine) Anatolii Sukhanov	2021 IFMA World Championships, First Round	Bangkok, Thailand	Decision (30:27)	3	3:00
2021-10-	Loss	(Russia) Sergey Ponomarev	2021 WAKO World Championship, Quarter Final	Jesolo, Italy	Decision (unanimous)	3	3:00
2021-10-	Win	(Kazakhstan) Akhmet Alimbekov	2021 WAKO World Championship, 1/8 Final	Jesolo, Italy	Decision (unanimous)	3	3:00
2020-02-08	Win	(Turkey) Gazi Akman	2020 Turkish U-23 Muay Thai Championships, Final	Kozaklı, Turkey	Decision	3	3:00
Wins 2020 Turkish U-23 Muay Thai Championships −86kg Gold Medal.
2020-02-07	Win	(Turkey) Gokhan Cam	2020 Turkish U-23 Championships, Semi-final	Kozaklı, Turkey	Decision	3	3:00
2019-10-24	Loss	(Bosnia and Herzegovina) Igor Emkic	2019 WAKO World Championships, Quarter Finals	Sarajevo, Bosnia and Herzegovina	Decision (split)	3	2:00
2019-10-23	Win	(Germany) Alexander Grunwald	2019 WAKO World Championships, First Round	Sarajevo, Bosnia and Herzegovina	Decision (split)	3	2:00
2019-04-07	Win	(Uzbekistan) Akhmet Alimbekov	WAKO International Turkish Open, Final	Antalya, Turkey	Decision (30:27)	3	2:00
2019-04-06	Win	(Turkey) İbrahi̇m Haci Özkul	WAKO International Turkish Open, Semi-final	Antalya, Turkey	Decision (30:27)	3	2:00
2019-04-05	Win	(Jordan) Yahia Al-Sharaia	WAKO International Turkish Open, Quarter Final	Antalya, Turkey	Decision (30:27)	3	2:00
2018-07-28	Loss	(Czech Republic) Matej Penaz	2018 FISU Muaythai World University Championships, Final	Pattaya, Thailand	Decision (29:28)	3	3:00
Wins 2018 FISU World Championship −91kg Silver Medal.
2018-07-26	Win	(Russia) Akhmed	2018 FISU Muaythai World University Championships, Quarter Finals	Pattaya, Thailand	TKO	2	
2018-05-16	Loss	(Poland) Lukasz Radosz	2018 IFMA World Championship, Semi-finals	Cancún, Mexico	Decision (30:27)	3	3:00
Won 2018 IFMA World Championship −86kg Bronze Medal.
2018-05-14	Win	(Peru) Matteo Celli	2018 IFMA World Championship, Quarter Finals	Cancún, Mexico	Decision (30:27)	3	3:00
2017-11-	Loss	(Russia) Ian Petrovich	2017 WAKO World Championships, Semi-finals	Budapest, Hungary	Decision (unanimous)	3	2:00
Won 2017 WAKO World Championship Full Contact −91kg Bronze Medal.
2017-11-	Win	(Brazil) Adilson Facchin	2017 WAKO World Championships, Quarter Finals	Budapest, Hungary	Decision (unanimous)	3	2:00
2017-10-21	Loss	(Czech Republic) Jakub Klauda	2017 IFMA European Championships, Final	Paris, France	Decision (29:27)	3	3:00
Won 2017 IFMA European Championship −91kg Silver Medal.
2017-10-18	Win	(Sweden) Wassim Elkassem	2017 IFMA European Championships, Semi-finals	Paris, France	Decision (29:28)	3	3:00
2017-07-28	Loss	(Czech Republic) Jakub Klauda	2017 World Games, Quarter Finals	Wrocław, Poland	Decision (30:27)	3	3:00
2017-05-11	Win	(Sweden) Wassim Elkassem	2017 IFMA World Championship, Final	Minsk, Belarus	Decision (30:27)	3	3:00
Won 2017 IFMA World Championship −91kg Gold Medal.
2017-05-10	Win	(Australia) Luke Thompson	2017 IFMA World Championship, Semi-finals	Minsk, Belarus	Decision (30:27)	3	3:00
2017-05-08	Win	(Latvia) Kristap Zile	2017 IFMA World Championship, Quarter Finals	Minsk, Belarus	Walk over		
2017-05-07	Win	(Belarus) Ivan Danilau	2017 IFMA World Championship, First Round	Minsk, Belarus	Decision (30:26)	3	3:00
2016-11-	Loss	(Poland) Mateusz Kubiszyn	2016 WAKO European Championships, Semi-finals	Loutraki, Greece	Decision (unanimous)	3	2:00
Won 2016 WAKO European Championship Full Contact −86kg Bronze Medal.
2015-08-	Loss	(Turkmenistan) Tejenov Yallakapberdi	2015 IFMA World Championship, First Round	Bangkok, Thailand	TKO	1	
2014-10-25	Win	(France) Nicolas Chiummiento	2014 WAKO European Championships, Final	Bilbao, Spain	KO		
Won 2014 WAKO European Championship Full Contact −86kg Gold Medal.
2014-10-24	Win	(Germany) Konstantin Filatov	2014 WAKO European Championships, Semi-finals	Bilbao, Spain	Decision (split)	3	2:00
2014-10-22	Win	(Austria) Christoph Mallitis	2014 WAKO European Championships, Quarter Finals	Bilbao, Spain	Decision (unanimous)	3	2:00
2013-09-	Loss	(Russia) Marat Paratsev	2013 WAKO European Junior Championships, Final	Krynica-Zdrój, Poland			
Won 2013 WAKO European Championship Junior Full Contact −86kg Bronze Medal.
2013-09-	Win	(Croatia) Marko Milun	2013 WAKO European Junior Championships, Semi-finals	Krynica-Zdrój, Poland			
Legend: Win Loss Draw/no contest Notes
