= Antônio Arroyo =

Brazilian mixed martial arts fighter

- Born: 1 July 1989 (age 37); Brazil
- Height: 6 ft 0 in (1.83 m)
- Weight: 205 lb (93 kg; 14 st 9 lb)
- Division: Light heavyweight Middleweight
- Reach: 73 in (185 cm)
- Stance: Orthodox
- Fighting out of: Soure, Para, Brazil
- Team: Marajó Brothers Team; Jackson Wink MMA Academy (2018–present)
- Rank: Dark blue belt in Muay Thai
- Years active: 2014–present

Mixed martial arts record
- Total: 18
- Wins: 12
- By knockout: 6
- By submission: 5
- By decision: 1
- Losses: 6
- By knockout: 1
- By submission: 2
- By decision: 3

Other information
- Mixed martial arts record from Sherdog

João Antônio Barbosa Arroyo (born 1 July 1989) is a Brazilian mixed martial artist who competes in the middleweight division. He has formerly competed for the Ultimate Fighting Championship.

== Background ==
After graduating with a business degree and working for a year as a marketing assistant, Arroyo decided to pursue MMA professionally, after practicing martial arts through most of his youth.

== Mixed martial arts career ==
=== Early career ===
Starting his career in 2014, Arroyo compiled a 7–2 record on the regional Brazilian scene, capturing the Salvaterra Marajó Fight Middleweight Championship in the process. After this, he was invited onto Dana White's Contender Series Brazil 1, where he won a unanimous decision against Diego Henrique da Silva. This win did not however earn him a UFC contract. Arroyo was invited back the next year to Dana White's Contender Series 20, where he faced Stephen Regman and winning the bout via arm-triangle choke in the second round. This time, Arroyo earned a UFC contract for his performance.

=== Ultimate Fighting Championship ===
Arroyo was expected to make his promotional debut against Kevin Holland on 16 November 2019 at UFC Fight Night: Błachowicz vs. Jacaré. However, in late September, promotion officials elected to remove Holland from the bout in favor of a matchup against Brendan Allen on 18 October 2019 at UFC on ESPN 6. Alessio Di Chirico was then expected to face Arroyo, however, it was announced on 24 October 2019 that Arroyo was scheduled to fight André Muniz instead. Arroyo lost the fight via unanimous decision.

Arroyo was scheduled to face Trevin Giles on 8 February 2020 at UFC 247. However Arroyo pulled out a day before the event due to medical issues and was replaced by James Krause.

Arroyo was expected to face Andreas Michailidis at UFC Fight Night: Felder vs. dos Anjos on 14 November 2020. However, Michailidis withdrew on 23 October due to undisclosed reasons and was replaced Eryk Anders. At the weigh-ins, Anders weighed in at 187.5 pounds, one and a half pounds over the middleweight non-title fight limit. The bout was to proceed at catchweight, and Anders fined 20% of his purse, which would go to Arroyo. Anders eventually pulled out of the fight the next day as a consequence of the weigh-cut and the bout was canceled.

Arroyo, as a replacement for Antônio Braga Neto, faced Deron Winn on 19 December 2020 at UFC Fight Night: Thompson vs. Neal at a catchweight of 196 lbs. Arroyo lost the fight via unanimous decision.

Arroyo was scheduled to face Tom Breese on 5 June 2021 at UFC Fight Night: Rozenstruik vs. Sakai. However the fight would be cancelled a few hours before it was to take place due to medical issues suffered by Breese.

Arroyo faced Joaquin Buckley on 18 September 2021 at UFC Fight Night: Smith vs. Spann. He lost the fight via knockout in round three.

After the loss, Arroyo was announced to no longer be a part of the UFC roster.

=== Post UFC ===
After winning via triangle choke on the Brazilian regional scene, Arroyo faced Evgeniy Ignatiev on August 26, 2022 at RCC 12. He lost the bout via unanimous decision.

== Karate Combat ==
After debuting with Karate Combat and winning his first two bouts by technical knockout, Arroyo faced Sam Alvey on March 23, 2024 at Karate Combat Kickback 2 and the bout ended in a no contest as a result of an accidental headbutt which rendered Alvey unable to continue.

Arroyo faced Sam Alvey in a rematch for the Karate Combat Heavyweight Championship on July 25, 2024 at Karate Combat 48. He lost the bout by technical knockout in the fourth round.

== Championships and accomplishments ==
=== Mixed martial arts ===
- Salvaterra Marajó Fight
  - SMF Middleweight Championship (One time)

== Mixed martial arts record ==
Professional record breakdown
| 18 matches | 12 wins | 6 losses |
| By knockout | 6 | 1 |
| By submission | 5 | 2 |
| By decision | 1 | 3 |

| Res. | Record | Opponent | Method | Event | Date | Round | Time | Location | Notes |
|---|---|---|---|---|---|---|---|---|---|
| Win | 12–6 | Silmar Nunes | TKO (punches) | The King Fight Combat 1 | 22 June 2025 | 1 | 4:40 | Belém, Brazil | |
| Win | 11–6 | Amadeu Aguiar de Oliveira | KO (head kick) | Brutal Fight Combat 4 | 26 April 2025 | 1 | 1:10 | Porto Velho, Brazil | Won the inaugural BRTL Light Heavyweight Championship. |
| Loss | 10–6 | Mikhail Ragozin | Decision (unanimous) | RCC 12 | 26 August 2022 | 3 | 5:00 | Yekaterinburg, Russia | Middleweight bout. |
| Win | 10–5 | Johnson Bacelar | Technical Submission (triangle choke) | Dispute Fight Series 1 | 6 August 2022 | 1 | 2:20 | Santarém, Brazil | Return to Light Heavyweight. Won the inaugural DFS Light Heavyweight Championship. |
| Loss | 9–5 | Joaquin Buckley | KO (punches) | UFC Fight Night: Smith vs. Spann | 18 September 2021 | 3 | 2:26 | Las Vegas, Nevada, United States | |
| Loss | 9–4 | Deron Winn | Decision (unanimous) | UFC Fight Night: Thompson vs. Neal | 19 December 2020 | 3 | 5:00 | Las Vegas, Nevada, United States | Catchweight (195 lb) bout. |
| Loss | 9–3 | André Muniz | Decision (unanimous) | UFC Fight Night: Błachowicz vs. Jacaré | 16 November 2019 | 3 | 5:00 | São Paulo, Brazil | |
| Win | 9–2 | Stephen Regman | Submission (arm-triangle choke) | Dana White's Contender Series 20 | 16 July 2019 | 2 | 3:31 | Las Vegas, Nevada, United States | |
| Win | 8–2 | Diego Henrique | Decision (unanimous) | Dana White's Contender Series Brazil 1 | August 10, 2018 | 3 | 5:00 | Las Vegas, Nevada, United States | |
| Win | 7–2 | Adriano Miranda | Submission (rear-naked choke) | Salvaterra Marajó Fight 8 | July 12, 2018 | 1 | 3:03 | Salvaterra, Brazil | Won vacant SMF Middleweight Championship. |
| Win | 6–2 | Antônio Soares | KO (kick to the body) | Pará Fight 1 | March 10, 2018 | 1 | 1:54 | Belém, Brazil | |
| Win | 5–2 | Trevor Carlson | KO (knee) | Fierce FC 6 | September 30, 2017 | 1 | 0:19 | Tooele, Utah, United States | Return to Middleweight. |
| Loss | 4–2 | Herdem Alacabek | Submission (rear-naked choke) | LFA 13 | 2 June 2017 | 1 | 3:51 | Burbank, California, United States | Light Heavyweight debut. |
| Win | 4–1 | Felipe Oliveira | Submission (arm-triangle choke) | Marajo Open Fight 2 | November 10, 2016 | 1 | 2:07 | Soure, Brazil | |
| Loss | 3–1 | Brendson Ribeiro | Submission (guillotine choke) | Revelation FC 2 | November 13, 2015 | 1 | 3:59 | Belém, Brazil | |
| Win | 3–0 | Ailton da Silva | KO (head kick) | Fusao de Artes Marciais 5 | September 26, 2015 | 1 | 2:37 | Soure, Brazil | |
| Win | 2–0 | Pedro Henrique | Submission (arm-triangle choke) | Jurunense Open Fight MMA 8 | September 25, 2014 | 1 | 3:34 | Belém, Brazil | |
| Win | 1–0 | Gabriel Batalha | TKO (punches) | Fusao de Artes Marciais 3 | July 17, 2014 | 1 | 0:58 | Soure, Brazil | Middleweight debut. |

== Karate Combat record ==
Professional record breakdown
| 4 matches | 2 wins | 1 loss |
| By knockout | 2 | 1 |
| By decision | 0 | 0 |
| No contests | 1 | |

| Res. | Record | Opponent | Method | Event | Date | Round | Time | Location | Notes |
|---|---|---|---|---|---|---|---|---|---|
| Loss | 2–1 (1) | Sam Alvey | TKO (punches) | Karate Combat 48 | March 23, 2024 | 4 | 2:33 | Nashville, Tennessee, United States | For the Karate Combat Heavyweight Championship. |
| NC | 2–0 (1) | Sam Alvey | NC (accidental headbutt) | Karate Combat Kickback 2 | March 23, 2024 | 2 | 1:34 | Cancun, Quintana Roo, Mexico | For the Karate Combat Heavyweight Championship. Accidental headbutt rendered Alvey unable to continue. |
| Win | 2–0 | Reynaldo Acevedo | KO (knee to the head) | Karate Combat 41 | September 16, 2023 | 2 | 2:45 | La Romana, Dominican Republic | |
| Win | 1–0 | Cody Jerabek | TKO (leg injury) | Karate Combat 39 | May 20, 2023 | 1 | 1:43 | Miami, Florida, United States | |

== See also ==
- List of male mixed martial artists
