= Gerce, Kozaklı =

Gerce
- Village
- Location within Turkey Location within Turkey Central Anatolia
- Coordinates: 39°07′51″N 34°47′33″E
- Country: Turkey
- Province: Nevşehir
- District: Kozaklı
- Population (2022): 100
- Time zone: UTC+3 (TRT)

Gerce is a village in Kozaklı District, Nevşehir Province, Turkey. Its population is 100 (2022).
