= Karate Combat =

Full-contact karate league

- Current season, competition or edition: 2025 in Karate Combat
- Sport: Karate; Submission grappling
- Founder: Robert Bryan
- Owner: Sensei Foundation
- President: Asim Zaidi
- Headquarters: Dubai
- Broadcaster: beIN SPORTS
- Website: www.karate.com

Karate Combat (KC) is a brand which promotes the first professional full-contact karate league, hosting worldwide events since April 2018. The private company is headquartered in Dubai and was founded by Robert Bryan. Karate Combat is owned by the Sensei Foundation, a Cayman Islands Foundation Company and its affiliates. The brand also encompasses sports equipment, a worldwide Dojo network and mobile apps for viewers. Karate Combat was founded in order to promote karate as a sport and martial art to the new generation of sports fans.

Contestants compete in a seasonal championship in which the winner is awarded a golden belt. They consist of karateka from various styles of karate like Kyokushinkai, Shotokan, Shitō-ryū, and Wadō-ryū. Contestants from other martial arts disciplines like Kenpō, Taekwondo, and Tang Soo Do have also participated. The contestants are expected to abide by karate-do etiquette and specific tournament rules.

The organization puts emphasis on innovation and technology with the use of video game-style analytics of fighter's biometrics, nutrition and DNA-based data in real-time. Fights regularly feature CGI environments created with the Unreal Engine as reported by NBC Sports. Marketing and promotion include appearances of Bas Rutten, Georges St-Pierre, Lyoto Machida and Stephen Thompson, who have all served as league ambassadors, as well as Danny Trejo and Hafþór Júlíus Björnsson.

In 2020, rights to Karate Combat have been acquired by beIN SPORTS. The media group broadcasts the Karate Combat seasons in 37 countries.

== Rules ==
Fighting takes place in a 6,5m x 6,5m (21'4" x 21'4") square combat pit surrounded by 45° angled walls. A match consists of 3 rounds each lasting 3 minutes with the possibility of 2 additional rounds for championship fights.

Scoring uses a 10-point must system and is based on aggression and effectiveness of attacks. Three judges evaluate each fight from a position around the combat pit. Scoring cards are omitted in case of a knock-out.

Equipment consists of 4oz gloves, mouthpieces, groin protectors for male contestants, karate belts and officially designed long karate trousers with national emblems or flags.

Wrestling, submissions, elbows are not permitted. A grounded opponent may use upkicks while the standing opponent may use ground punches. After 5 seconds any grounded opponent will be brought back to a standing position by the referee.

=== Weight divisions and classifications ===
Division	Upper weight limit	Gender
Heavyweight	No limit	Men
Light Heavyweight	205 lb (93 kg)	Men
Middleweight	185 lb (84 kg)	Men
Welterweight	170 lb (77 kg)	Men
Lightweight	155 lb (70 kg)	Men
Featherweight	145 lb (66 kg)	Women
Bantamweight	135 lb (61 kg)	Women / Men
Flyweight	125 lb (57 kg)	Women
Strawweight	115 lb (52 kg)	Women

== Pit Submission Series ==
In January 2024, Karate Combat announced that they would begin staging professional grappling matches in the pit prior to their karate fights, under the name of "Pit Submission Series." The first fight under the Pit Submission Series took place on January 26, 2024.

== Current championships ==
Championship	Current Champion(s)	Date won	Previous Champion(s)	Defenses
Karate Combat Heavyweight Championship	(Cuba) Robelis Despaigne	December 5, 2025	(United States) Sam Alvey	0
Karate Combat Light Heavyweight Championship	(United States) Sam Alvey	July 24, 2026	Inaugural	0
Karate Combat Middleweight Championship	(Russia) Ilyas Khamzin	October 30, 2025	(United States) Ross Levine	2
Karate Combat Welterweight Championship	(Morocco) Oussama Assli	December 5, 2025	(Azerbaijan) Rafael Aghayev	1
Karate Combat Lightweight Championship	Vacant	March 2, 2026	(Pakistan) Shahzaib Rindh	0
Karate Combat Featherweight Championship	(United States) Andre Ewell	October 17, 2026	(Brazil) Luiz Victor Rocha	0
Karate Combat Bantamweight Championship	(Chile) Arturo Vergara	December 19, 2024	(Russia) Myrza-Bek Tebuev	0
Karate Combat Women's Bantamweight Championship	(Hungary) Melinda Fabian	December 15, 2023	Inaugural	0
Karate Combat Women's Flyweight Championship	(Brazil) Aline Pereira	July 19, 2025	Inaugural	0
Karate Combat Women's Straweight Championship	(Brazil) Sthefanie Oliveira (Brazil) Lili Ferreira (interim)	November 3, 2023 February 13, 2026	Inaugural	0

== Championship history ==
=== Heavyweight Championship ===
Weight limit: None

No.	Name	Event	Date	Reign	Defenses
1	(United States) Sam Alvey def. Ross Levine	Karate Combat 43; Las Vegas, Nevada	December 15, 2023	721 days	NC. Antônio Arroyo at Karate Combat: Kickback 2 on March 23, 2024: 1. Antônio Arroyo at Karate Combat 48 on July 25, 2024; 2. Tyrone Spong at Karate Combat 54 on May 2, 2025
2	(Cuba) Robelis Despaigne def. Sam Alvey	Karate Combat 58; Doral, Florida	December 5, 2025	336 days (incumbent)	

=== Light Heavyweight Championship ===
Weight limit: 205lb

No.	Name	Event	Date	Reign	Defenses
1	(United States) Sam Alvey def. Uriah Hall	Karate Combat 62; Miami, Florida	July 24, 2026	105 days (incumbent)	

=== Middleweight Championship ===
Weight limit: 185lb

No.	Name	Event	Date	Reign	Defenses
1	(Azerbaijan) Shahin Atamov def. Franklin Mina	Karate Combat The Future Episode 10; Orlando, Florida	September 2, 2021	296 days	
2	(United States) Ross Levine def. Shahin Atamov	Karate Combat Season 4 Event 2 Orlando, Florida	June 25, 2022	705 days	1. def. Igor De Castañeda at Karate Combat 38 on December 1, 2022; 2. def. Adrian Hadribeaj at Karate Combat 46 on May 30, 2024
Levine retired from combat sports.
3	(Russia) Ilyas Khamzin def. Adrian Weathersby	Karate Combat 57; Miami, Florida	October 31, 2025	371 days (incumbent)	1. def. Alex Lohoré at Karate Combat 60 on March 27, 2026; 2. def. Cosmo Alexandre at RCC & Karate Combat 63 on October 17, 2026

=== Welterweight Championship ===
Weight limit: 170lb

No.	Name	Event	Date	Reign	Defenses
1	(United States) Josh Quayhagen def. Jerome Brown	Karate Combat Neo Tokyo Episode 7 Orlando, Florida	October 25, 2020	1001 days	1. def. Dionicio Gustavo at Karate Combat Okinawa 2 on July 11, 2021
—	(Azerbaijan) Rafael Aghayev def. Raymond Daniels for interim title	Karate Combat 37; Salamanca, New York	December 17, 2022	–	
2	(Azerbaijan) Rafael Aghayev def. Josh Quayhagen	Karate Combat 40; Orlando, Florida	June 24, 2023	616 days	
Aghayev retired from combat sports in March 2025.
3	(Morocco) Oussama Assli def. James Honey	Karate Combat 58; Doral, Florida	December 5, 2025	336 days (incumbent)	1. def. Lucas Martins at Karate Combat 62 on July 24, 2026

=== Lightweight Championship ===
Weight limit: 155lb

No.	Name	Event	Date	Reign	Defenses
1	(Latvia) Edgars Skrīvers def. Luiz Victor Rocha	Karate Combat Evolution; Orlando, Florida	September, 2019	980 days	1. def. Myrza-bek Tebuev at Karate Combat Neo Tokyo episode 7 on November 8th, 2021; 2. def. Bruno Assis at Hollywood Hills Event 7 in August 12th, 2021
2	(Brazil) Luiz Victor Rocha def. Edgars Skrivers	Karate Combat Season 4 Event 2 Orlando, Florida	May 28, 2022	1148 days	1. def. Bruno Souza at KC 39 on May 20th, 2023; 2. def. Edgars Skrīvers at KC43 in November 3rd, 2023
—	(Pakistan) Shahzaib Rind def. Bruno Assis for interim title	Karate Combat 47; Singapore	September 18, 2024	–	1. def. Edgars Skrīvers at KC52 on January 24th, 2025
3	(Pakistan) Shahzaib Rind def. Luis Victor Rocha	Karate Combat 56; Miami, Florida	July 19, 2025	226 days	
The title was vacated on March 2, 2026 after the weight class changed from 150 lbs. to 155 lbs.

=== Featherweight Championship ===
Weight limit: 145lb

No.	Name	Event	Date	Reign	Defenses
1	(Brazil) Luiz Victor Rocha def. Adam Noi	Karate Combat 60; Yekaterinburg, Russia	March 27, 2026	204 days	
2	(United States) Andre Ewell def. Luiz Victor Rocha	RCC & Karate Combat 63; Yekaterinburg, Russia	October 17, 2026	20 days (incumbent)	

=== Bantamweight Championship ===
Weight limit: 135lb

No.	Name	Event	Date	Reign	Defenses
1	(Republic of Ireland) Eoghan Chelmiah def. Illies Mardhi	Karate Combat Season 3 Episode 12 on September 16, 2021; Orlando, Florida	October 25, 2020	1086 days	1. def. Illies Mardhi at Karate Combat Season 4 Episode 4 on June 25th, 2022; 2. def. Jesus Paurcarcaja Lopez at Hollywood Hills Event 7 in December 2022
2	(Russia) Myrza-Bek Tebuev def. Eoghan Chelmiah	Karate Combat 41; Dominican Republic	September 16, 2023	460 days	1. def. Luiz Victor Rocha at Karate Combat 45 on April 20th, 2024
Myrza-Bek Tebuev vacated the belt for unknown reasons.
3	(Chile) Arturo Vergara def. Eoghan Chelmiah	Karate Combat 51 Orlando, Florida	December 19, 2024	687 days (incumbent)	

=== Women's Bantamweight Championship ===
Weight limit: 135lb

No.	Name	Event	Date	Reign	Defenses
1	(Hungary) Melinda Fabian def. Omaira Molina	Karate Combat 43; Las Vegas, Nevada	December 15, 2023	1057 days (incumbent)	

=== Women's Flyweight Championship ===
Weight limit: 125lb

No.	Name	Event	Date	Reign	Defenses
1	(Brazil) Aline Pereira def. Fani Peloumpi	Karate Combat 56; Miami, Florida	July 19, 2025	475 days (incumbent)	

=== Women's Strawweight Championship ===
Weight limit: 115lb

No.	Name	Event	Date	Reign	Defenses
1	(Brazil) Sthefanie Oliveira def. Christina Kavakopoulou	Karate Combat 42; Orlando, Florida	November 3, 2023	1099 days (incumbent)	
—	(Brazil) Lili Ferreira def. Monika Chochlíková for interim title	Karate Combat 59; Miami, Florida	February 13, 2026	–	

== Karate Combat records ==
Longest championship reign	(Brazil) Luiz Victor Rocha	1148 days
Most wins	(Pakistan) Shahzaib Rind	9
Oldest champion	(United States) Sam Alvey	40 years, 1 months
Youngest champion	(Republic of Ireland) Eoghan Chelmiah	24 years, 1 months
Most title fight wins	(Brazil) Luiz Victor Rocha (United States) Sam Alvey	4
Most consecutive title defenses	(Latvia) Edgars Skrivers (Republic of Ireland) Eoghan Chelmiah (Brazil) Luiz Victor Rocha (United States) Ross Levine (United States) Sam Alvey (Russia) Ilyas Khamzin	2

== Events ==
=== Overview ===
Karate Combat events feature male and female karateka from a roster of over 100 professional fighters. The first five events were held in front of an invite-only audience. Later events incorporate CGI effects and original music in order to achieve a modern appearance and appeal to a younger demographic. Event locations favor optimal camera angles and cinematic scenery over a big live-audience. Thus locations like the 102nd floor of the One World Trade Center were chosen hosting a selected audience with black-tie dress code. The events attracted the notice of American television and newspaper. Recordings of all events can be accessed for free via the official website. Past events have also been streamed via UFC Fight Pass.

=== Seasons ===
Season	Episodes	Originally released
1	6	2019
2	12	2020
3	12	2021
4	4	2022
KC35	1	2022
KC36	1	2022
KC37	1	2022
KC38	1	2023
KC39	1	2023
KC40	1	2023
KC41	1	2023
KC42	1	2023

==== Season 1 ====
#	Event	Date	Venue	Location	Fight Card	VOD
0	Karate Combat: Genesis	February 3, 2018	Secret Warehouse	Budapest, Hungary	Rafael Aghayev - Dionicio Gustavo; Achraf Ouchen - Elhadji G Ndour; Luiz Victor Rocha - Reda Messaoudi; Lahad Cisse - Aykit Usda; Muslum Basturk - Joshua Quayhagen; Deivis Ferreras - Saeid Ahmadikaryani; Randy Cura - Alexandre Bouderbane	Watch
1	Karate Combat: Inception	April 26, 2018	Miami Beach	Miami, U.S.	Elhadji Ndour - Andras Virag; Alexandre Bouderbane - Dionicio Gustavo; Abdalla Ibrahim - Joshua Quayhagen; Spyros Margaritopoulos - Mohamed Salem Mohamed; Lahad Cisse - Adham Sabry; Pedro Roman Roig - Jerome Brown	Watch
2	Karate Combat: Olympus	July 28, 2018	Zappeion Courtyard	Athens, Greece	Jerome Brown - Davy Dona; Deivis Ferreras - Myrza-bek Tebuev; Achraf Ouchen - Franklin Mina; Fabiola Esquivel González - Sarah Ait Ibrahim; Fioravante Valentino - Igor De Castañeda; Wellington Barbosa - Yaser Sahintekin; Reda Messaoudi - Nikos Kosmas	Watch
3	Karate Combat: One World	September 27, 2018	One World Trade Center	New York City, U.S.	Abdalla Ibrahim - Dionicio Gustavo; Dimitrios Triantafyllis - Luiz Victor Rocha; Elhadji G Ndour - Adilet Shadykanov; Spyros Margaritopoulos - Jorge Perez; Joshua Quayhagen - Vitalie Certan; Adham Sabry - András Virág; Pedro Roman Roig - Jesus Paucarcaja Lopez; Gabriele Cera - Fernando Moreno Paz; Teeik Silva - Edgars Skrivers	Watch
4	Karate Combat: Hollywood	January 24, 2019	Avalon	Los Angeles, U.S.	Luiz Victor Rocha - Myrza-bek Tebuev; Elhadji G Ndour - Calum Robb; Igor De Castañeda - Milos Vukovic; Abdalla Ibrahim - Kevin Walker; Daniel Viveros - Ilies Mardhi; Alexandre Bouderbane - Willians Quirino; Nadege Ait Ibrahim - Ana Luiza Ferreira Da Silva; Teeik Silva - Kevin Kowalczik; Luis Diogo - Jonas Correia	Watch
5	Karate Combat: Evolution	September 21, 2019	KC-1	Orlando, U.S.	Luiz Victor Rocha - Edgars Skrivers; Dionicio Gustavo - Joshua Quayhagen; Abdalla Ibrahim - Davy Dona; Jorge Perez - Shahin Atamov; Igor De Castañeda - Zsolt Habda	Watch

==== Season 2 ====
#	Event	Date	Venue	Location	Fight Card	VOD
1	Karate Combat: Anger Wat I	2020	Mixed Reality	Unknown	Abdalla Ibrahim - Jerome Brown; Maximilian Mathes - Stefanos Roupakas; Deivis Ferreras - Jesús López	Watch
2	Karate Combat: Anger Wat II	2020	Mixed Reality	Unknown	Ilies Mardhi - Pedro Roig Roman; Reda Messaoudi - Joshua Quayhagen; Craig Ryan - Rida Boutadout	Watch
3	Karate Combat: Anger Wat III	2020	Mixed Reality	Unknown	Myrza-Bek Tebuev - Daniel Viveros; Calum Robb - Franklin Mina; Vitalie Certan - Gabriele Cera	Watch
4	Karate Combat: Scrap Punk I	2020	Mixed Reality	Unknown	Luiz Victor Rocha - Ilies Mardhi; Stefanos Roupakas - Daniel Viveros; Bruno Assis - Gergő Horváth	Watch
5	Karate Combat: Scrap Punk II	2020	Mixed Reality	Unknown	Jerome Brown - Joshua Quayhagen; Bryan van Waesberghe - Lahad Cisse	Watch
6	Karate Combat: Scrap Punk III	2020	Mixed Reality	Unknown	Shahin Atamov - Franklin Mina; Dionicio Gustavo - Reda Messaoudi; Gilmarcos de Bastos Jr. - András Virág	Watch
7	Karate Combat: Neo Tokyo I	2020	Mixed Reality	Unknown	Edgars Skrivers - Myrza-bek Tebuev; Willians Quirino - Nikos Gikados	Watch
8	Karate Combat: Neo Tokyo II	2020	Mixed Reality	Unknown	Christina Kavakopoulou - Fabiola Esquivel; Andrei Grinevich - Achraf Ouchen	Watch
9	Karate Combat: Neo Tokyo III	2020	Mixed Reality	Unknown	Bruno Assis - Teeik Silva; Melinda Fabian - Ana Luiza Ferreira Da Silva	Watch
10	Karate Combat: Valhalla I	2020	Mixed Reality	Unknown	Davy Dona - Nikos Gidakos; Igor de Castañeda - Shahin Atamov; Franklin Mina - Bryan Van Waesberghe	Watch
11	Karate Combat: Valhalla II	2020	Mixed Reality	Unknown	Vitalie Certan - Nikita Yanchuk; Anna Laura Prezzoti - Omaira Molina	Watch
12	Karate Combat: Valhalla III	2020	Mixed Reality	Unknown	Bruno Assis - Jesus Lopez; Teeik Silva - Pedro Roman Roig; Willians Quirino - Vasilii Antokhii	Watch

==== Season 3 ====
#	Event	Date	Fight Card	VOD
1	Karate Combat: Okinawa Event 01	JULY 4, 2021	Azouz vs Chelmiah; Lukacs vs Ameknassi; Tebuev vs Silva	Watch
2	Karate Combat: Okinawa Event 02	JULY 11, 2021	Hasanov vs Mardhi; Gustavo vs Quayhagen	Watch
3	Karate Combat: Okinawa Event 03	JULY 18, 2021	Anthokhii vs Dona; Kavakopoulou vs Linhares; Habda vs Gera	Watch
4	Karate Combat: Okinawa Event 04	JULY 25, 2021	Azouz vs Brito; Ferreras vs Mathes	Watch
5	Karate Combat: Hollywood Hills Event 05	JULY 29, 2021	Gidakos vs Bastos; Perez vs Jeknic; Ericsson vs Ramirez	Watch
6	Karate Combat: Hollywood Hills Event 06	AUGUST 5, 2021	Oudoud vs Chelmiah; Antokhii vs Messaoudi; Atamov vs Van Waesberghe	Watch
7	Karate Combat: Hollywood Hills Event 07	AUGUST 12, 2021	Molina vs Santos; Certan vs Viveros; Assis vs Skrivers	Watch
8	Karate Combat: Hollywood Hills Event 08	AUGUST 19, 2021	Kukulicic vs Ha; Esquivel vs Villanueva; Hasanov vs Lopez; Yanchuk vs Rocha	Watch
9	Karate Combat: Future Event 09	AUGUST 26, 2021	Novikov vs Lukacs; Castaneda vs Perez; Grinevich vs Levine	Watch
10	Karate Combat: Future Event 10	SEPTEMBER 2, 2021	Cera vs Bouderbane; Mina vs Atamov	Watch
11	Karate Combat: Future Event 11	SEPTEMBER 9, 2021	Zsiga vs Thorpe; Uzakov vs Ramirez; Antokhii vs Paz	Watch
12	Karate Combat: Future Event 12	SEPTEMBER 16, 2021	Ferreras vs Certan; Chelmiah vs Mardhi	Watch

==== Season 4 ====
#	Event	Date	Fight Card	VOD
1	Karate Combat: Event 1	MAY 14, 2022	Tommy Azouz vs Artur Gasanov; Sthefanie Oliveira vs Fabiola Esquivel; Mitchell Thorpe vs Lazar Kukulicic; Ross Levine vs Igor De Castaneda	Watch
2	Karate Combat: Event 2	MAY 28, 2022	Dastonbek Otabolaev vs Andres Madera; Dionicio Gustavo vs Nikita Yanchuk; Edgars Skrivers vs Luiz Rocha	Watch
3	Karate Combat: Event 3	JUNE 11, 2022	Damian Villa vs Gabriel Stankunas; Jesus Lopez vs Myrza-bek Tebuev; Vitalie Certan vs Bruno Assis; Rafael Aghayev vs Zsolt Habda	Watch
4	Karate Combat: Event 4	JUNE 25, 2022	Robbie Lavoie vs Moulay Odoud; Adrian Galvan vs Rob Buxton; Omaira Molina vs Ana Ferreira; Alberto Ramierz vs Matthew Stevens; Gabriel Varga vs Bruno Assis; Rafael Aghayev vs Davy Dona; Eoghan Chemliah vs Ilies Mardhi; Ross Levine v Shahin Atamov	Watch

==== KC35 ====
Event	Date	Fight Card	VOD
KC35	AUGUST 27, 2022	Deivis Ferreras vs Kevin Kowalczik; Gabriele Cera vs Jonnie Broad; Teeik Silva vs Maximo Nunez; Gabriel Stankunas vs Jesus Lopez; Bruno Souza vs Maciej Tercjak; Achraf Ouchen vs Elhadji G Ndour; Raymond Daniels vs Franklin Mina; Luiz Rocha vs Joshua Quayhagen	Watch

==== KC36 ====
Event	Date	Fight Card	VOD
KC36	OCTOBER 29, 2022	Maximiliano Larrosa vs Damian Villa; Abdessalam Ameknassi vs Kalvis Kalnins; Nikos Gidakos vs Kenji Grillon; Elvin Aghayev vs Chayil Calaway; Tommy Azouz vs Mitchell Thope; Fernando Paz vs Diego Avendano; James Vick vs Jorge Perez	Watch

==== KC37 ====
Event	Date	Fight Card	VOD
KC37	DECEMBER 17, 2022	Rafael Aghayev vs Raymond Daniels; Eoghan Chelmiah vs Jesus Lopez; Gabriel Varga vs Tommy Azouz; Samuel Ericsson vs Tarek Khelifi; Rob Buxton vs Sasha Palatnikov; Andres Madera vs Maciej Tercjak; Maximo Nunez vs Gabriel Stankunas; Gabo Diaz vs Samy Ennkhaili	Watch

==== KC38 ====
Event	Date	Fight Card	VOD
KC38	APRIL 2, 2023	Ross Levine vs Igor de Castaneda; Eoghan Chelmiah vs Jesus Lopez; Bruno Souza vs Bruno Assis; Sasha Palatnikov vs Adrian Hadribeaj; James Vick vs Gabriele Cera; Erica Santos vs Melinda Fabian; Shahzaib Rind vs Gabo Diaz; Kenji Grillon vs Jorge Perez; Robbie LaVoie vs Damian Villa; Davy Dona vs Dionicio Gustavo	Watch

==== KC39 ====
Event	Date	Fight Card	VOD
KC39	MAY 20, 2023	Luiz Rocha vs Bruno Souza; Raymond Daniels vs Sasha Palatnikov; Shahzaib Rind vs Tommy Azouz; Cody Jerabek vs Antônio Arroyo; Alberto Ramirez vs Maciej Tercjak; Elijah Everill vs Rahul Bhowmick; Ana Luiza da Silva vs Nathalia Dinis; Adam Rosa Ramos vs Zakaria BenBouchta; Gabriel Stankunas vs Ignacio Capllonch; Jonathan Broad vs Will Esparza	Watch

==== KC40 ====
Event	Date	Fight Card	VOD
KC40	JUNE 25, 2023	Josh Quayhagen vs Rafael Aghayev; Edgars Skrivers vs Gabriel Varga; Samuel Ericsson vs Alexandre Bouderbane; Kenji Grillon vs Shahin Atamov; Jesus Lopez vs Ilies Mardhi; Marcel Ritter vs Kai Calaway; Fernando Paz vs Jeremy Payet; Deivis Ferreras vs Mitchell Thorpe; Jo Miyahara vs Leo Valdivia; Maximo Nunez vs Damian Villa	Watch

==== KC41 ====
Event	Date	Fight Card	VOD
KC41	SEPTEMBER 16, 2023	Eoghan Chelmiah vs Myrza-Bek Tebuev; Tim Ha vs Deivis Ferreras; Antônio Arroyo vs Reynaldo Acevedo; Jorge Perez vs Gabriele Cera; Sam Alvey vs Adam Rosa; Maximo Nunez vs Moulay Oudoud; Ana Villanueva vs Rafaela Bernardo; Erica Santos vs Sarah Ait Ibrahim; Vinicius Bareta vs Antonio Molloy	Watch

==== KC42 ====
Event	Date	Fight Card	VOD
KC42	NOVEMBER 3, 2023	Luiz Rocha vs Edgars Skrivers; Sthefanie Oliveira vs Christina Kavakopoulou; Jorge Perez vs Jo Miyahara; Bruno Assis vs Tim Ha; Elias Santos vs Mitchell Thorpe; Kenji Grillon vs Vasilii Antokhii; Oscar Sosa vs Elvin Aghayev; Jeremy Payet vs Zhang Kui; Lazar Kukulicic vs Artur Gasanov; Alejandro Brugal vs Diego Avendano; Ariano Gavino Diaz vs Li Lishan	Watch

==== KC43 ====
Event	Date	Fight Card	VOD
KC43	DECEMBER 15, 2023	Anthony Pettis vs Benson Henderson; Ross Levine vs Sam Alvey; Omaira Molina vs Melinda Fabian; Raymond Daniels vs Bruno Souza; Gorjan Slaveski vs Brandon Jenkins; Freddy Masabo vs Danaa Batgerel; Omar Morales vs. Armus Guyton; Shahzaib Rind vs. Federico Avella; Shannon Hudson vs Chinzo Machida; Saidyokub Kakhramonov vs. Gabriel Stankunas; Elijah Everill vs Javier Arteaga; Loxbey Montalvan vs Gabriel Diaz; Jordan Lee Barker vs Damian Villa	Watch

==== KC Kickback 1 ====
Event	Date	Fight Card	VOD
Kickback 1	JANUARY 27, 2024	Luis Melendez vs Jose Ferreri; Arturo Vergara vs Nathan Fought; Roland Dunlap vs Michael Cora; Gustavo Oliveira vs Safarmamad Akhmadov; Joshua Alvarez vs Kobe Bowen; Reggie Northrupp vs Mike Lee; Saidyokub Kakhromonov vs Peter Caballero; Joilton Lutterbach vs Darren Smith	Watch

==== KC44 ====
Event	Date	Fight Card	VOD
KC44	FEBRUARY 24, 2024	Maciej Tercjak vs Shannon Hudson; Rodrigo Reyes vs Marco Sanchez; Fabrizio Escarrega vs Nikita Yanchuk; Levy Marroquin vs Andre Ewell; Efraín Escudero vs Rafael Alves; Shahzaib Rind vs Marco Cubas; Alejandro Flores vs Bruno De Assis; Erik Pérez vs Eoghan Chelmiah	Watch

==== KC Kickback 2 ====
Event	Date	Fight Card	VOD
Kickback 2	MARCH 23, 2024	Sam Alvey vs Antônio Arroyo; Gillian Robertson vs Montana De La Rosa; Gregor Gracie vs Gesias Cavalcante; Ethan Crelinstein vs Troy Worthen; Jesús Paucarcaja Lopez vs José Quiñónez; Joilton Lutterbach vs Jorge Morales; Weber Almeida vs Andre Rodriguez; Omar Morales vs Antonio Molloy; Saba Nabavinejad vs Fabiola Esquivel; Niko Korventaus vs Jhonasky Sojo; Lorenzo Trevino vs Brandon Alcaráz; Gustavo Viquez vs Joaquín Morales	Watch

==== KC45 ====
Event	Date	Fight Card	VOD
KC45	APRIL 20, 2024	Luke Rockhold vs Joe Schilling; Myrza-Bek Tebuev vs Luiz Rocha; Eddie Farrell vs Raymond Daniels; Bruno Souza vs Vitaliy Dubina; Saidyokub Kakhramonov vs Tananut Johphromma; Shahzaib Rind vs Rana Singh; Himanshu Kaushik vs Faizan Khan; Rizwan Ali vs Pawan Gupta; Adam Noi vs Ali Motamed; Ali Zarinfar vs Shuailu Huang; Craig Jones vs Rinat Fakhretdinov; Pouya Rahmani vs Kaynan Duarte; Zayed Alkatheeri vs Osamah Almarwai; Furkatbek Yokubov vs Júlio Carreiro; Mirafzal Akhtamov vs Sulaiman Ghafoori	Watch

==== KC46 ====
Event	Date	Fight Card	VOD
KC46	MAY 30, 2024	Ross Levine vs Adrian Hadribeaj; Andres Madera vs Gabriel Varga; Brandon Jenkins vs Charlie Ontiveros; Markus Perez vs Bam Morris; Eoghan Chelmiah vs Maximo Nunez; Arturo Vergara vs Jesse Bazzi; Ethan Crelinstein vs Jordan Leavitt; Lucas Barbosa vs AJ Agazarm; Helena Crevar vs Mariya Agapova	Watch

==== KC47 ====
Event	Date	Fight Card	VOD
KC47	JUNE 28, 2024	Rafael Alves vs James Vick; Arturo Vergara vs Joe Penafiel; Alejandro Brugal vs Armus Guyton; Luis Melendez vs Jose Esparza; Lorenzo Trevino vs Jonathan Ortiz; Philip Rowe vs Lucas LaRue; Loxbey Montalvan vs Jonathan Rodriguez; Gustavo Genao vs Gabriel Stankunas; Kat Nelson vs Brittney Cloudy; Javier Arteaga vs Justin McCollum; Pedro Rocha vs Isaque Bahiense	Watch

==== KC48 ====
Event	Date	Fight Card	VOD
KC48	JULY 25, 2024	KC Heavyweight Championship: Sam Alvey vs Antônio Arroyo Co-Main Event: Cristian Pérez vs John Marquez; Pit Submission Series Main Event: Aljamain Sterling vs Jay-Jay Wilson; Efraín Escudero vs Brandon Jenkins; Peter Caballero vs Weber Almedia; Jordan Winski vs Eoghan Chelmiah Nic Carter vs Coty Kuhn; Erik Velie vs Harley Hermanson; Phil Russel vs Dwight Aubrey Speight; Lauren Sweeney vs Lisa Bechina; Sean Suvie vs Jordan ONeil; Safarmamad Akhmadov vs Gustavo Oliveira; Elijah Everill vs Briven Sullivan; Alexandr Romanov vs Roosevelt De Sousa; Patrick Gaudio vs Diego Ramalho Dylan O'Sullivan vs Robert Conor Bracken; Adrian Weathersby vs Irvin Jones	Watch

==== KC49 ====
Event	Date	Fight Card	VOD
KC49	SEPTEMBER 2024	KC Interim Lightweight Championship: Shahzaib Rind vs Bruno Assis Award Kazimba vs Dzhabar Askerov; Adam Noi vs Erik Pérez; Christopher Alvidrez vs Levy Saúl Marroquín; Gustavo Sousa vs Sasha Palatnikov; Gorjan Slaveski vs Muhammed Kir Ahmet; Jeremy Payet vs Alejandro Oteo; Mohaddeseh Moradi vs Lishan Li; Artur Gasanov vs Vinicius Bereta; Lorenzo Trevino vs Murugan Silvarajoo	Watch

==== KC50 ====
Event	Date	Fight Card	VOD
KC50	OCTOBER 2024	Grappling Vagner Rocha vs Calon Sabino; AJ Agazarm vs Piter Frank; Paulo Miyao vs Pablo Mantovani; Daniel Sathler vs Matheus Costa; Omar Morales vs Alejandro Brugal Karate; Arturo Vergara vs Safar Akhmadov; Markus Perez vs Artur Alibulatov; Joe Giannetti vs Brandon Jenkins; Aline Pereira vs Dee Begley; Luan Santiago vs Korey Kuppe; Oussama Assli vs Peter Stanonik; Adrian Weathersby vs Bam Morris; Loxbey Montalvan vs Orlando Ortega; Jade Jorand vs Stephanie Skinner; Luis Melendez vs Armus Guyton; Harley Hermanson vs Tokibusa	Watch

==== KC51 ====
Event	Date	Fight Card	VOD
KC51	DECEMBER 2024	Grappling Alexandre de Jesus vs Michael Sainz; Roosevelt Sousa vs Daishi Goto Karate; KC Interim Bantamweight Championship: Arturo Vergara vs Eoghan Chelmiah; Cosmo Alexandre vs Igor de Castañeda; Rafael Alves vs Khama Worthy; Robelis Despaigne vs Dominik Jędrzejczyk; Gabriel Varga vs Andres Madera; Jayden Eynaud vs Adam Rosa; Loxbey Montalvan vs Israel Gonzalez; Jade Jorand vs Saba Nabavinejad; Gorjan Slaveski vs Noah Cutter; Oussama Assli vs Michel M	Watch

==== KC52 ====
Event	Date	Fight Card	VOD
KC52	JANUARY 2025	Karate KC Lightweight Championship: Shahzaib Rind vs Edgars Skrīvers; Aline Pereira vs Amanda Torres; Robelis Despaigne vs Marcos Brigagão; Lucas Martins vs Ilyas Khamzin; Tyson Nam vs Loxbey Montalvan; Brandon Jenkins vs Elad Suman; Luan Santiago vs Efraín Escudero; Anvar Boynazarov vs Ignacio Capllonch; Luis Melendez vs Donevin Manuel; Alexander Krutskykh vs Tim Ha; Harry Gomez vs Jakub Wayman; Enrique Valdez vs Yarobis Castaneda Grappling; Richie Lewis vs Lance Palmer; Samuel Nagai vs Fabricio Andrey; Daniel Sathler vs Ansar Khamzaev	Watch

==== KC53 ====
Event	Date	Fight Card	VOD
KC53	FEBRUARY 2025	Karate Arturo Vergara vs Zac Riley; Robelis Despaigne vs Roggers Souza; Luis Guerrero vs Anvar Boynazarov; Weber Almeida vs Jeremy Payet; Oussama Assli vs Omar Ezekiel Moreno; Jayden Eynaud vs Julius Anglickas; Ilyas Khamzin vs Dwight Grant; Adrian Weathersby vs Conor Bracken; Jordan Lee Barker vs Safar Akhmadov; Shokrukh Kholmuradov vs Brynnen Grappling; Caio Borralho vs Brendan Allen	Watch

==== KC54 ====
Event	Date	Fight Card	VOD
KC54	MAY 2025	Karate KC Heavyweight Championship: Sam Alvey vs Tyrone Spong; Muhammad Mokaev vs Bolat Zamanbekov; Kiamrian Abbasov vs Jayden Eynaud; Adam Noi vs Ali Zarinfar; Oussama Assli vs Naiimov Firdavszhon; Ali Aliev vs Mohamad Osseili; Saufullakh Khambakhadov vs Hossein Mollamahdi; Sajad Sattari vs Mo Abdurahman; Bruno Chaves vs Sergey Veselkin; Abdullah Chandio vs Ali AlQaisi; Asha Roka vs Lishan Li; Roslan Bendania vs Amro Abdeen; Dawood Tirmiizi vs Brandon Jensen Grappling; Arman Tsarukyan vs Makkasharip Zaynukov; Pouya Rahmani vs Slim Trabelsi; Saygid Izagakhmaev vs Khotam Boynazarov	Watch

==== KC55 ====
Event	Date	Fight Card	VOD
KC55	JULY 2025	Robelis Despaigne vs Zac Pauga Arturo Vergara vs Frank Yannick Mbassi; Zac Pauga vs Daniel James; Robelis Despaigne vs Tim Johnson; Daniel James vs Braxton Smith; Zac Pauga vs Alan Belcher; Timothy Johnson vs Chase Sherman; Robelis Despaigne vs Saulo Cav	Watch

==== KC56 ====
Event	Date	Fight Card	VOD
KC56	JULY 2025	KC Lightweight Championship: Shahzaib Rind vs Luiz Rocha KC Vacant Women's Flyweight Championship: Aline Pereira vs Fani Peloumpi; Lorenz Larkin vs Buddy Wallace; Luan Santiago vs Zach Juusola; Ilyas Khamzin vs Alex Oliveira; Daniel Lacerda vs Anvar Boynazarov; Ryan Kuse vs Jarod Grant; Alexander Krutskykh vs Shokrukh Kholmuradov; Loxbey Montalvan vs Gustavo Viquez	Watch

==== KC57 ====
Event	Date	Fight Card	VOD
KC57	OCTOBER 2025	KC Middleweight Championship: Ilyas Khamzin vs Adrian Weathersby Uriah Hall vs Markus Perez; Luis Peña vs Rafael Alves; Andre Ewell vs Weber Almeida; Luiz Rocha vs Shokrukh Kholmuradov; Elisandra Ferreira vs Jade Jorand; Emiliano Sordi vs Zac Pauga; Eoghan Chelmiah vs Cameron Page; Damir Ismagulov vs Tyler Hill; Monika Chochlíková vs Janaína Silva; Apollo Gomes vs Hector Santiago	Watch

==== KC58 ====
Event	Date	Fight Card	VOD
KC58	DECEMBER 2025	KC Heavyweight Championship: Sam Alvey (c) vs Robelis Despaigne KC Vacant Welterweight Championship: Oussama Assli vs James Honey; Vanilto Antunes vs Lorenz Larkin; Chris Barnett vs Johnathan Miller; Namo Fazil vs Guilherme Bastos; Oscar Remihana vs Brandon Jenkins; Claudio Ribeiro vs Jayden Eynaud; Markus Perez vs Wallace Lopes; Montè Deon Ogbonna-Morrison vs Erko Jun; Érica Santos vs Débora Évora; Sergey Ponomarev vs Glaico França	Watch

==== KC59 ====
Event	Date	Fight Card	VOD
KC59	FEBRUARY 2026	Grappling; Valter Walker vs Zion Clark Karate; KC Vacant Women's Strawweight Championship: Elisandra Ferreira vs Monika Chochlíková; Uriah Hall vs Jayden Eynaud; Vitor Costa vs Markus Perez; Glaico França vs Oscar Remihana; Roybert Echeverria vs Elias Garcia; Malcolm Schuyler vs Jadon Lee; Claudio Ribeiro vs Michel Borges; Jeremy Henry vs Sitik Muduev; William Findley vs Elijah Barnes	Watch

==== KC60 ====
Event	Date	Fight Card	VOD
KC60	MARCH 2026	KC Middleweight Championship: Ilyas Khamzin vs Alex Lohoré KC Featherweight Championship: Luiz Rocha vs Adam Noi; Guram Kutateladze vs Kadir Dalkiran; Dmitriy Kireev vs T.J. Brown; Ali Aliev vs Valeriy Bizyaev; Sergey Veselkin vs Ivan Grachev; Sajad Sattari vs Alisher Karmenov; Saufullakh Khambakhadov vs Morteza Seififard; Kyara van der Klooster vs Funda Alkayış; Sergey Ponomarev vs Vanilto Antunes; Igor Zagaynov vs Shamsutdin Makhmudov; Diana Pogosyan vs Liana Jojua; Award Kazimba vs Dmitriy Dmitriev; Igor Glazkov vs Luis Henrique Barbosa	Watch

==== KC61 ====
Event	Date	Fight Card	VOD
KC61	MAY 2026	Shahzaib Rind vs Andre Ewell Guram Kutateladze vs Lucas Almeida; Claudio Ribeiro vs Curtis Millender; Larissa Pacheco vs Julia Stasiuk; Tommy Aaron vs Armus Guyton; Vanilto Antunes vs Reggie Northrup; Adrian Weathersby vs Josenaldo Silva; Janaína Silva vs Jady Menezes; Sitik Muduev vs Devin Lee	Watch

==== KC62 ====
Event	Date	Fight Card	VOD
KC62	JULY 2026	Karate; KC Inaugural Light Heavyweight Championship: Sam Alvey vs Uriah Hall KC Welterweight Championship: Oussama Assli vs Lucas Martins; Joilton Lutterbach vs Charlie Decca; Andre Ewell vs Daniel Lacerda; William Findley vs Conor Bracken; Vanilto Antunes vs Bailey King; Débora Évora vs Julia Stasiuk; Ryan Kuse vs Shad Walters; Yusuf Esembaev vs Paulo Machado; Grappling; Jacob Rodriguez vs Vagner Rocha; Ethan Crelinstein vs Christos Giagos	Watch

== Controversy ==
In late 2025, Karate Combat faced multiple allegations related to financial instability, including claims of unpaid fighters, staff, and vendors. Reports indicated that several athletes publicly stated they had not received contracted purses for months, with some alleging they were only paid after raising concerns publicly.

Production crews, employees, and affiliated gyms also reported delayed or missing payments, with some workers claiming they had gone unpaid for extended periods.

The organization was additionally subject to legal action from vendors. Multiple lawsuits were filed against ITP Productions LLC, the entity operating Karate Combat, seeking payment for unpaid invoices totaling hundreds of thousands of U.S. dollars related to event production services.

Operational issues were also reported during events, including delays attributed to staff refusing to work due to outstanding payments.

Concerns regarding the promotion’s cryptocurrency operations further contributed to the controversy. Allegations emerged that large quantities of the organization’s proprietary $KARATE tokens had been sold by leadership during a period of financial strain, which coincided with a decline in the token’s value and criticism from community members.

The situation led to broader questions about the organization’s financial viability, with some reports suggesting the possibility of regulatory consequences, including potential license suspension following event-related issues.

== See also ==
- Karate at the Summer Olympics
- Karate World Championships
