= UFC Fight Night: Covington vs. Woodley =

UFC mixed martial arts event in 2020

- The poster for UFC Fight Night: Covington vs. Woodley
- Promotion: Ultimate Fighting Championship
- Date: September 19, 2020
- Venue: UFC Apex
- City: Enterprise, Nevada, United States
- Attendance: None (behind closed doors)

Event chronology
UFC Fight Night: Waterson vs. Hill	UFC Fight Night: Covington vs. Woodley	UFC 253: Adesanya vs. Costa

UFC Fight Night: Covington vs. Woodley (also known as UFC Fight Night 178, UFC on ESPN+ 36 and UFC Vegas 11) was a mixed martial arts event produced by the Ultimate Fighting Championship that took place on September 19, 2020, at the UFC Apex facility in Enterprise, Nevada, part of the Las Vegas Metropolitan Area, United States.

== Background ==
The event was originally expected to take place on September 26, but it was moved up a week. UFC 253 took place on the former date.

UFC officials had initially targeted a welterweight bout between former UFC Welterweight Champion Tyron Woodley and former interim champion Colby Covington to serve as the event headliner for UFC on ESPN: Munhoz vs. Edgar, but Woodley announced that the date did not provide him with time suitable enough to prepare because of injuries incurred during his most recent fight. The pairing headlined this event.

A heavyweight bout between Ciryl Gane and Shamil Abdurakhimov was expected to take place at this event. The pairing was originally scheduled for UFC 249, but Gane was forced to pull out of the event after he was struck by a pneumothorax in training. Subsequently, the pairing was rescheduled for UFC 251 and cancelled a second time as Abdurakhimov was removed from the bout for undisclosed reasons. They were later rebooked for UFC 253, before eventually having the bout shifted to this event. In turn, the bout then shifted again for undisclosed reasons and was expected to take place four weeks later at UFC Fight Night: Ortega vs. The Korean Zombie.

A flyweight bout between Jordan Espinosa and David Dvořák was expected to take place at UFC 253, but was later rebooked for this event due to undisclosed reasons.

A welterweight bout between Mickey Gall and Miguel Baeza was scheduled for the event. However, Gall pulled out on September 11 due to an injury. He was replaced by Jeremiah Wells. On September 17, it was announced that the bout was cancelled due to undisclosed reasons.

A featherweight bout between Mirsad Bektić and Luiz Eduardo Garagorri was scheduled for the event. However, Garagorri was pulled from the fight on September 15 after a cornerman of his tested positive for COVID-19. Bektić faced returning veteran Damon Jackson.

== Results ==
Main card (ESPN+)
Weight class				Method	Round	Time	Notes
Welterweight	Colby Covington	def.	Tyron Woodley	TKO (rib injury)	5	1:19
Welterweight	Donald Cerrone	vs.	Niko Price	No Contest (overturned)	3	5:00	(Note: Price was deducted one point in round 1 due to repeated eye pokes. Originally a majority draw (29–27, 28–28, 28–28); overturned after Price tested positive for carboxy THC.)
Middleweight	Khamzat Chimaev	def.	Gerald Meerschaert	KO (punch)	1	0:17
Light Heavyweight	Johnny Walker	def.	Ryan Spann	KO (elbows and punches)	1	2:43
Women's Strawweight	Mackenzie Dern	def.	Randa Markos	Submission (armbar)	1	3:44
Middleweight	Kevin Holland	def.	Darren Stewart	Decision (split) (28–29, 29–28, 29–28)	3	5:00
Preliminary card (ESPN+)
Flyweight	David Dvořák	def.	Jordan Espinosa	Decision (unanimous) (30–27, 30–27, 30–27)	3	5:00
Featherweight	Damon Jackson	def.	Mirsad Bektić	Submission (guillotine choke)	3	1:21
Women’s Flyweight	Mayra Bueno Silva	def.	Mara Romero Borella	Submission (armbar)	1	2:29
Women’s Bantamweight	Jessica-Rose Clark	def.	Sarah Alpar	TKO (punch and knee)	3	4:21
Featherweight	Darrick Minner	def.	T.J. Laramie	Submission (guillotine choke)	1	0:52
Bantamweight	Randy Costa	def.	Journey Newson	KO (head kick)	1	0:41
Bantamweight	Andre Ewell	def.	Irwin Rivera	Decision (split) (29–28, 28–29, 29–28)	3	5:00
Bantamweight	Tyson Nam	def.	Jerome Rivera	TKO (punches)	2	0:34

== Bonus awards ==
The following fighters received $50,000 bonuses.

- Fight of the Night: No bonus awarded.
- Performance of the Night: Khamzat Chimaev, Mackenzie Dern, Damon Jackson and Randy Costa

== Aftermath ==
On November 4, it was announced that the Nevada State Athletic Commission (NSAC) issued a temporary suspension for Niko Price, after he tested positive for carboxy THC in a drug test related to his fight. A month later, On November 4, Price was officially suspended for six months retroactive to the date of the fight, with the result of the bout being overturned to a no contest due to the violation. He was fined $8,500 and before he is re-licensed in Las Vegas, Price will also have to pay a prosecution fee of $145.36.

== See also ==
- List of UFC events
- List of current UFC fighters
- 2020 in UFC
