= Sergey Ponomarev (kickboxer) =

Japanese kickboxer

- Born: Сергей Пономарев; July 27, 1994 (age 32); Solikamsk, Russia
- Nickname: The Wolverine
- Height: 186 cm (6 ft 1 in)
- Weight: 84 kg (185 lb; 13.2 st)
- Fighting out of: Solikamsk, Russia
- Team: Ural Kali Fighter
- Trainer: Sergey Matveev
- Years active: 2019 - present

Kickboxing record
- Total: 14
- Wins: 11
- By knockout: 5
- Losses: 2
- By knockout: 1
- No contests: 1

Sergey Ponomarev (born July 27, 1995) is a Russian kickboxer. He is ranked as the second best middleweight in the world by Combat Press as of September 2022, and fifth best by Beyond Kick as of October 2022.

== Professional career ==
Ponomarev faced Robert Oganesyan at the February 22, 2019, Tatneft Cup event. He won the fight by decision. Ponomarev next faced Dmitry Baranov at the July 18, 2019, Tatneft Cup event. He lost the fight by a first-round knockout, as he was stopped with a flurry of punches near the end of the opening round. It was both his first professional loss and the first stoppage loss of his career.

Ponomarev faced Konstantin Males at Fair Fight 11 on March 20, 2020. He won the fight by unanimous decision. Ponomarev was next booked to face Mikhail Sartakov at the November 28, 2020 event. He won the fight by unanimous decision. Ponomarev next faced Aliev Ali at the March 8, 2021, Fair Fight event, in a middleweight title eliminator. He won the fight by unanimous decision.

Ponomarev faced Sekou Banguru at Fair Fight XV on November 28, 2021. He won the fight by a first-round knockout, flooring Banguru with a right straight at the 1:05 minute mark of the second round.

Ponomarev was booked to face Sher Mamazulunov for the Fair Fight middleweight championship at Fair Fight XVI on February 12, 2022. He won the fight by split decision.

Ponomarev faced Serdar Yiğit Eroğlu at Ural FC 1 on July 1, 2022. He won the fight by unanimous decision.

Ponomarev faced Gadzhimurad Amirzhanov for the Russian National -86 kg title at Cup of Lotus on September 16, 2022. She won the fight by a fourth-round technical knockout, as Amirzhanov retired from the bout before the start of the fifth round.

Ponomaraev made his first Russian National title defense against Islam Murtazaev at REN TV Fight Club on February 17, 2023. He lost the fight by unanimous decision.

Ponomaraev faced Khasan Acinik at Naiza FC 52 & Ural FC 3 on June 23, 2023. He won the fight by a first-round knockout.

Ponomarev was expected to face Ulric Bokeme at Ural FC 4 on October 20, 2023. Bokeme later withdrew for undisclosed reasons and was replaced by Juri De Sousa. Ponomaraev won the fight by a first-round technical knockout.

Ponomaraev faced Jayden Eynaud for the vacant Ural FC K-1 -85 kg title at Ural FC 8 on October 16, 2024. He won the fight by split decision.

== Karate Combat ==
Ponomarev signed with Karate Combat on January 29, 2025, and made his promotional debut on December 5, 2025. Ponomarev was originally scheduled to face Claudio Ribeiro; however, the bout was scrapped, and both fighters were reassigned new opponents. Ponomarev ultimately made his Karate Combat debut at Karate Combat 58 against Glaico França, winning the fight by unanimous decision.

== Titles and accomplishments ==
=== Professional ===
- Fair Fight
  - 2022 Fair Fight Middleweight (-85 kg) Championship (revoked)
- Russian Kickboxing Federation
  - 2022 Russian K-1 -86 kg Championship
- Ural Fighting Championship
  - 2024 Ural FC K-1 -85 kg Champion

Awards

- 2022 Russian Kickboxing Federation Fighter of the Year

=== Amateur ===
- World Association of Kickboxing Organizations
  - 2014 WAKO European Championship Light Contact (-94 kg) (silver)
  - 2015 WAKO World Championship Light Contact (-94 kg) (gold)
  - 2016 WAKO European Championship Light Contact (-94 kg) (gold)
  - 2017 WAKO Bestfighter World Cup (-94 kg) (bronze)
  - 2017 WAKO World Championship Light Contact (-94 kg) (gold)
  - 2018 WAKO Bestfighter World Cup (-94 kg) (gold)
  - 2018 WAKO European Championship Light Contact (-94 kg) (gold)
  - 2019 WAKO K-1 World Grand Prix -86 kg (silver)
  - 2021 WAKO World Championship K-1 (-86 kg) (silver)

== Karate Combat record ==
Professional record breakdown
3 matches	2 wins	1 loss
By knockout	1	0
By decision	1	1

Res.	Record	Opponent	Method	Event	Date	Round	Time	Location	Notes
Loss	2–1	Gadzhimurad Amirzhanov	Decision (unanimous)	RCC x Karate Combat Fight Night	October 17, 2026	3	3:00	Yekaterinburg, Russia	
Win	2–0	Vanilto Antunes	TKO (punches)	Karate Combat 60	May 27, 2026	3	2:12	Yekaterinburg, Russia	Catchweight 190 lbs
Win	1–0	Glaico França	Decision (unanimous)	Karate Combat 58	5 December 2025	3	5:00	Doral, Florida, United States	

== Kickboxing record ==
Professional Kickboxing Record
11 Wins (5 (T)KO's), 2 Losses, 0 Draw, 1 No Contests
Date	Result	Opponent	Event	Location	Method	Round	Time
2024-10-16	Win	(Australia) Jayden Eynaud	Ural FC 8	Perm, Russia	Decision (Split)	5	3:00
Wins the vacant Ural FC K-1 -85 kg title.
2024-04-28	Win	(Kazakhstan) Kairatbek Zharekeev	FKR PRO 9	Ulyanovsk, Russia	DQ (Illegal elbow)	2	
2023-10-19	Win	(Portugal) Juri De Sousa	Ural FC 4	Perm, Russia	TKO (Punches)	1	1:06
2023-06-23	Win	(Turkey) Khasan Acinik	Naiza FC 52 & Ural FC 3	Almaty, Kazakhstan	TKO (Punches)	1	0:47
2023-02-17	Loss	(Russia) Islam Murtazaev	REN TV Fight Club	Minsk, Belarus	Decision (Unanimous)	5	3:00
Lost the Russian Kickboxing Federation K-1 -86 kg title.
2022-09-19	Win	(Russia) Gadzhimurad Amirzhanov	Cup of Lotus	Elista, Russia	TKO (Retirement)	4	3:00
Won the Russian Kickboxing Federation K-1 -86 kg title.
2022-07-01	Win	(Turkey) Serdar Yiğit Eroğlu	Ural FC 1	Perm, Russia	Decision (Unanimous)	3	3:00
2022-02-12	NC	(Uzbekistan) Sher Mamazulunov	Fair Fight XVI	Yekaterinburg, Russia	Decision (Split)	5	3:00
For the Fair Fight -85kg title. Originally a decision win for Ponomarev overturned after reclamation.
2021-08-28	Win	(Belarus) Sekou Banguru	Fair Fight XV	Yekaterinburg, Russia	KO (Right straight)	2	1:05
2021-03-08	Win	(Russia) Ali Aliyev	Fair Fight XIV	Yekaterinburg, Russia	Decision (Unanimous)	3	3:00
2020-11-28	Win	(Russia) Mikhail Sartakov	Fair Fight XIII	Yekaterinburg, Russia	Decision (Unanimous)	3	3:00
2020-03-20	Win	(Russia) Konstantin Males	Fair Fight XI	Yekaterinburg, Russia	Decision (Unanimous)	3	3:00
2019-07-18	Loss	(Belarus) Dmitry Baranov	2019 Tatneft Cup, -80 kg Semi Finals	Kazan, Russia	TKO (Punches)	1	2:48
2019-02-22	Win	(Greece) Robert Oganesyan	2019 Tatneft Cup, -80 kg Quarter Finals	Russia	Ext.R Decision	4	3:00
Legend: Win Loss Draw/No contest Notes

Amateur Kickboxing Record
Date	Result	Opponent	Event	Location	Method	Round	Time
2021-11-	Loss	(Serbia) Aleksandar Menkovic	2021 WAKO World Championship, Final	Jesolo, Italy	Decision (3-0)	3	2:00
Won 2021 WAKO World Championship K-1 -86kg Silver Medal.
2021-10-	Win	(France) Hassan Hamilcaro	2021 WAKO World Championship, Semi Final	Jesolo, Italy	Decision (3-0)	3	2:00
2021-10-	Win	(Turkey) Serdar Yiğit Eroğlu	2021 WAKO World Championship, Quarter Final	Jesolo, Italy	Decision (3-0)	3	2:00
2021-10-	Win	(Bosnia and Herzegovina) Igor Emkic	2021 WAKO World Championship, 1/8 Final	Jesolo, Italy	Decision (3-0)	3	2:00
2021-10-	Win	(Austria) Karim Mabrouk	2021 WAKO World Championship, First Round	Jesolo, Italy	Decision (3-0)	3	2:00
2019-09-28	Loss	(Belarus) Mikita Shostak	WAKO K-1 World Grand Prix 2019, Final	Prague, Czech Republic	Decision (2-1)	3	2:00
Won WAKO World Grand Prix 2019 K-1 -86kg Silver Medal.
2019-09-27	Win	(Czech Republic) Jakub Bakes	WAKO K-1 World Grand Prix 2019, Semi Final	Prague, Czech Republic	Decision (3-0)	3	2:00
2019-09-26	Win	(Poland) Adam Kosut	WAKO K-1 World Grand Prix 2019, Quarter Final	Prague, Czech Republic	Decision (3-0)	3	2:00
2019-05-17	Loss	(Serbia) Miloš Cvjetićanin	WAKO 25th Hungarian Kickboxing World Cup 2019, Quarterfinal	Budapest, Hungary	Decision (3:0)	3	2:00
2018-11-	Win	(Germany) Mike Hofer	2018 WAKO European Championship, Final	Maribor, Slovenia	Decision (3-0)	3	2:00
Won 2018 WAKO European Championship Light Contact -94kg Gold Medal.
2018-10-	Win	(Croatia) Jure Drlje	2018 WAKO European Championship, Semi Final	Maribor, Slovenia	Decision (3-0)	3	2:00
2018-10-	Win	(Ukraine) Roman Scherbatiuk	2018 WAKO European Championship, Quarter Final	Maribor, Slovenia	Decision (3-0)	3	2:00
2018-06-17	Win	(Russia) Ivan Maskaev	2018 WAKO Bestfighter World Cup, Final	Rimini, Italy	Decision	3	2:00
Won 2018 WAKO Bestfighter World Cup Light Contact -94kg Gold Medal.
2018-06-16	Win	(Austria) Nico Maier	2018 WAKO Bestfighter World Cup, Semi Final	Rimini, Italy	Decision (2-0)	3	2:00
2018-06-15	Win	(Norway) Vegard Egeberg	2018 WAKO Bestfighter World Cup, Quarter Final	Rimini, Italy	Decision (3-0)	3	2:00
2017-11-	Win	(Germany) Mike Hofer	2017 WAKO World Championship, Final	Budapest, Hungary	Decision	3	2:00
Won 2017 WAKO World Championship Light Contact -94kg Gold Medal.
2017-11-	Win	(Turkey) Hasan Mert Kizil	2017 WAKO World Championship, Semi Final	Budapest, Hungary	Decision (3-0)	3	2:00
2017-11-	Win	(Ukraine) Oleksandr Zhelepa	2017 WAKO World Championship, Quarter Final	Budapest, Hungary	Decision (2-1)	3	2:00
2017-06-16	Loss	(Ukraine) Ivan Hryschuk	2017 WAKO Bestfighter World Cup, Semi Final	Rimini, Italy	Decision (3-0)	3	2:00
Won 2017 WAKO Bestfighter World Cup Light Contact -94kg Bronze Medal.
2017-06-15	Win	(Italy) Riccardo Bilato	2017 WAKO Bestfighter World Cup, Quarter Final	Rimini, Italy	Decision (3-0)	3	2:00
2016-10-	Win	(Croatia) Boris Miskovic	2016 WAKO European Championship, Final	Maribor, Slovenia	Decision	3	2:00
Won 2016 WAKO European Championship Light Contact -94kg Gold Medal.
2016-10-	Win	(Turkey) Ibrahim Yalcinkaya	2016 WAKO European Championship, Semi Final	Maribor, Slovenia	Decision (3-0)	3	2:00
2016-10-	Win	(Austria) Marko Lovric	2016 WAKO European Championship, Quarter Final	Maribor, Slovenia	Decision (3-0)	3	2:00
2015-11-	Win	(Slovenia) Admir Sinanbegovic	2015 WAKO World Championship, Final	Dublin, Ireland	Decision (3-0)	3	2:00
Won 2015 WAKO World Championship Light Contact -94kg Gold Medal.
2015-11-	Win	(Germany) Mike Hofer	2015 WAKO World Championship, Semi Final	Dublin, Ireland	Decision (3-0)	3	2:00
2015-11-	Win	(Italy) Matia Bezzon	2015 WAKO World Championship, Quarter Final	Dublin, Ireland	Decision (2-1)	3	2:00
2014-11-	Loss	(Ukraine) Oleksandr Zhelepa	2014 WAKO European Championship, Final	Maribor, Slovenia	Decision (2-1)	3	2:00
Won 2014 WAKO European Championship Light Contact -94kg Silver Medal.
2014-11-	Win	(Croatia) Boris Miskovic	2014 WAKO European Championship, Semi Final	Maribor, Slovenia	Decision (3-0)	3	2:00
2014-11-	Win	(Italy) Fabio Panizzolo	2014 WAKO European Championship, Quarter Final	Maribor, Slovenia	Decision (3-0)	3	2:00
Legend: Win Loss Draw/No contest Notes

== See also ==
- List of male kickboxers
