= Kozaklı District =

District of Nevşehir Province, Turkey

- District
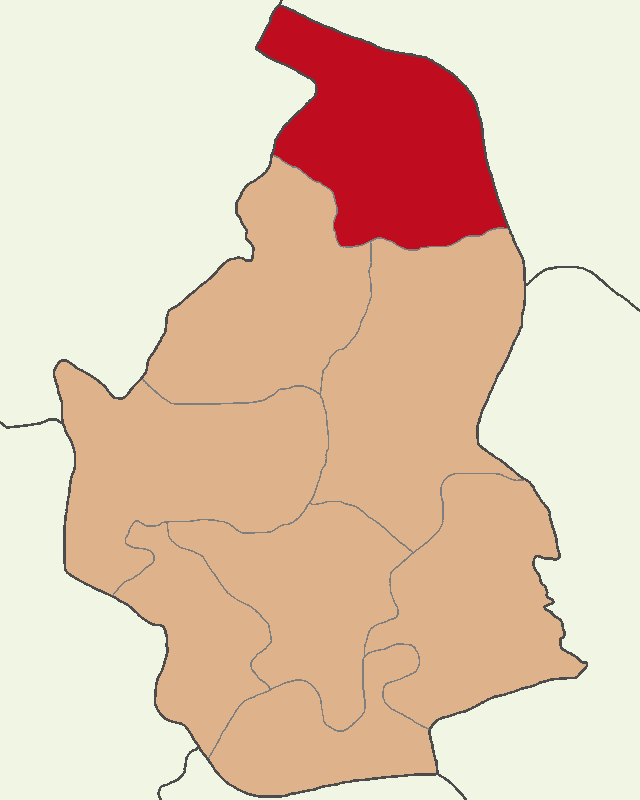
- Map showing Kozaklı District in Nevşehir Province

- Location in Turkey Kozaklı District (Turkey Central Anatolia)
- Coordinates: 39°13′N 34°51′E
- Country: Turkey
- Province: Nevşehir
- Seat: Kozaklı

Government
  - Kaymakam: Erkan Adıbelli
- Area: 772 km^{2} (298 sq mi)
- Population (2022): 12,910
  - Density: 17/km^{2} (43/sq mi)
- Time zone: UTC+3 (TRT)
- Website: www.kozakli.gov.tr

Kozaklı District is a district of the Nevşehir Province of Turkey. Its seat is the town of Kozaklı. Its area is 772 km^{2}, and its population is 12,910 (2022).

== Composition ==
There is one municipality in Kozaklı District:

- Kozaklı

There are 27 villages in Kozaklı District:

- Abdi
- Akpınar
- Aylı
- Belekli
- Boğaziçi
- Büyükyağlı
- Çağşak
- Çayiçi
- Dörtyol
- Doyduk
- Gerce
- Hacıfakılı
- Hızıruşağı
- İmran
- Kalecik
- Kanlıca
- Kapaklı
- Karahasanlı
- Karasenir
- Kaşkışla
- Küçükyağlı
- Küllüce
- Kuruağıl
- Merdanali
- Özce
- Taşlıhüyük
- Yassıca
