= Maciej Tercjak =

Polish kickboxer

- Born: 1 July 1994 (age 32); Łomża, Poland
- Nationality: Polish
- Height: 1.73 m (5 ft 8 in)
- Weight: 68.1 kg (150 lb; 10 st 10 lb)
- Style: Muay Thai and Kyokushin
- Stance: Southpaw
- Fighting out of: Łomża, Poland
- Team: Hunter Kickboxing; Uniq Fight Club (2023–2025)
- Rank: Black Belt in Kyokushin
- Years active: 2022 - present

Kickboxing record
- Total: 4
- Wins: 3
- By knockout: 2
- Losses: 1
- By knockout: 1
- Draws: 0

Other information
- Boxing record from BoxRec

Maciej Tercjak (born 1 July 1994) is a Polish kickboxer and karateka.

== Kickboxing career ==
Tercjak made his professional debut on May 7, 2022 where he faced Alexey Zienkiewicz. Tercjak won the fight by KO in the first minute of the first round.

After a two year hiatus, Tercjak made his return on August 3, 2024 where he took on Jakub Galiszewski. Tercjak won the fight by TKO after a kick to the liver.

Less than a month later, it was announced that Tercjak would fight debutant Marcin Kasprzak on October 5, 2024 under K-1 rules on the promotion Fight Exclusive Night. Here, he suffered his first defeat after taking a knee to the body in the second round.

== Karate Combat career ==
On July 27, 2022, it was announced that Tercjak signed with Karate promotion, Karate Combat. Tercjak made his debut with the promotion at Karate Combat 35 on August 27 of the same year against Bruno Souza. Tercjak lost that fight via unanimous decision. He had a four fight losing streak before being released after his loss to Shannon Hudson on February 24, 2024.

== Kickboxing and K-1 record ==
Professional kickboxing record
3 Wins (2 (T)KOs), 1 Loss, 0 Draw
Date	Result	Opponent	Event	Location	Method	Round	Time
2024-10-05	Loss	(Poland) Marcin Kasprzak	FEN 56: Wrocław Fight Night	Wrocław, Poland	TKO (Knee to body)	2	1:57
2024-08-03	Win	(Poland) Jakub Galiszewski	Steadfast 3	Warsaw, Poland	KO (Liver Kick)	2	0:49
2022-05-07	Win	(Poland) Alexey Zienkiewicz	HFO 12: Ostrołęka	Ostrołęka, Poland	KO (Head Kick)	1	0:44

== Karate Combat record ==
Professional record breakdown
4 matches	0 wins	4 losses
By knockout	0	2
By submission	0	0
By decision	0	2

Res.	Record	Opponent	Method	Event	Date	Round	Time	Location	Notes
Loss	0–4	Shannon Hudson	TKO (punches)	Karate Combat 44	February 23, 2024	2	2:40	Mexico City, Mexico	
Loss	0–3	Alberto Ramirez	Decision (unanimous)	Karate Combat 39	May 20, 2023	3	3:00	Miami, Florida, United States	
Loss	0–2	Andres Madera	TKO (punches)	Karate Combat 37	December 17, 2022	3	1:30	Orlando, Florida, United States	
Loss	0–1	Bruno Souza	Decision (unanimous)	Karate Combat 35	August 27, 2022	3	3:00	Orlando, Florida, United States	
