= Irwin Rivera =

Mexican mixed martial arts fighter

- Born: February 14, 1989 (age 37); Ciudad Nezahualcóyotl, Mexico
- Other names: The Beast
- Height: 5 ft 6 in (1.68 m)
- Weight: 135 lb (61 kg; 9 st 9 lb)
- Division: Bantamweight; Featherweight
- Reach: 67 in (170 cm)
- Team: Blackzilians (2013–2017); Sanford MMA (2017–present)
- Rank: Purple belt in Brazilian jiu-jitsu under Gilbert Burns and Herbert Burns
- Years active: 2014–present

Mixed martial arts record
- Total: 19
- Wins: 12
- By knockout: 6
- By submission: 1
- By decision: 5
- Losses: 7
- By knockout: 2
- By decision: 5

Other information
- Mixed martial arts record from Sherdog

Irwin Rivera (born February 14, 1989) is a Mexican mixed martial artist who competes in the Bantamweight division. A professional mixed martial artist since 2014, Rivera has competed for Combate Americas, Ultimate Fighting Championship, the Eagle Fighting Championship and Titan FC where he was the Bantamweight Champion.

== Background ==
Rivera was born in Ciudad Nezahualcóyotl, Mexico, but immigrated with his parents to New Windsor, New York where he grew up. He has a younger sister Kelly, older sister Lezlye and a brother. Rivera initially trained for boxing, but dabbled into mixed martial arts after his boxing gym closed its doors.

== Mixed martial arts career ==
=== Titan FC ===
After getting cut from Combate Americas, Rivera made his Titan Fighting Championship debut against Edir Terry at Titan FC 48 on February 16, 2018. He lost the fight due to technical knockout stemming from a leg injury.

Rivera made his sophomore appearance in Titan FC against Lazar Stojadinovic at Titan FC 53 on March 15, 2019. He won the fight via first-round knockout.

Rivera then faced Matt Wagy for the interim Titan FC Bantamweight Championship at Titan FC 55 on June 28, 2019. Rivera claimed the interim championship via fourth-round technical knockout stemming from a body punch. On November 11, 2019, Rivera was elevated to undisputed Bantamweight Champion after the reigning champion Rudson Caliocane vacated the title.

For his first title defense, Rivera faced Danny Sabatello at Titan FC 58 on December 20, 2019. Rivera retained his title via fourth-round technical knockout. In May 2020, Rivera vacated his title in order to sign with the Ultimate Fighting Championship.

=== Ultimate Fighting Championship ===
Replacing Mike Davis on two days' notice, Rivera signed with the UFC and faced Giga Chikadze in a featherweight bout at UFC Fight Night 172 on May 16, 2020. He lost the fight via unanimous decision.

Rivera made his second appearance in the organization at UFC Fight Night: Lewis vs. Oleinik on August 8, 2020, against Ali AlQaisi. He won the fight via split decision.

Rivera faced Andre Ewell on September 19, 2020, at UFC Fight Night 178. He lost the fight via split decision.

Rivera was scheduled to face Ray Rodriguez on March 13, 2021, at UFC Fight Night 187. Due to the two counts arrest of attempted murder of his two sisters, UFC rescinded their bout negotiation.

=== Post career ===
Rivera faced Firdavs Khasanov at Eagle FC 46 on March 11, 2022, his first bout since the domestic incident for which he was arrested. He won the bout in the second round after dropping Khasanov with a body kick and then finishing him with ground and pound.

Rivera faced Joseph Penafiel at Gamebred FC 4 in a bare-knuckle MMA bout on May 5, 2023, winning the bout via unanimous decision.

Rivera faced Joshua Weems on September 8, 2023, at Gamebred Fighting Championship 5, losing via unanimous decision.

== Legal troubles ==
In January 2021, Rivera was arrested on two counts of attempted murder in Palm Beach County, Florida after he allegedly stabbed his two sisters. He was booked into the Palm Beach County jail and held without bail. On January 8, it was revealed that Rivera was being kept in a mental health facility rather than in jail. His sisters also broke their silence, stating that they love Irwin and that all that they wish for their brother is for him to get the help that he needs for his mental state. Irwin was granted a conditional release from custody on October 19, 2021, after the judge in the case approved Rivera's plea of not guilty by reason of insanity. He was diagnosed with Bipolar I disorder and it was determined that he was having a psychotic episode at the time of the stabbings.

== Personal life ==
Rivera has a daughter (born 2016) from his previous relationship.

== Championships and accomplishments ==
- Titan FC
  - Titan FC Bantamweight Champion (one time)
    - One successful title defense vs. Danny Sabatello

== Mixed martial arts record ==
Professional record breakdown
19 matches	12 wins	7 losses
By knockout	5	2
By submission	1	0
By decision	6	5

Res.	Record	Opponent	Method	Event	Date	Round	Time	Location	Notes
Loss	12–7	Joshua Weems	Decision (unanimous)	Gamebred Fighting Championship 5	September 8, 2023	3	5:00	Jacksonville, Florida, United States	Bare Knuckle MMA.
Win	12–6	Joseph Penafiel	Decision (unanimous)	Gamebred Fighting Championship 4	May 5, 2023	3	5:00	Fort Lauderdale, Florida, United States	Bare Knuckle MMA. Catchweight (140 lb) bout.
Win	11–6	Firdavs Khasanov	TKO (body kick and punches)	Eagle FC 46	March 11, 2022	2	4:48	Miami, Florida, United States	
Loss	10–6	Andre Ewell	Decision (split)	UFC Fight Night: Covington vs. Woodley	September 19, 2020	3	5:00	Las Vegas, Nevada, United States	
Win	10–5	Ali AlQaisi	Decision (split)	UFC Fight Night: Lewis vs. Oleinik	August 8, 2020	3	5:00	Las Vegas, Nevada, United States	
Loss	9–5	Giga Chikadze	Decision (unanimous)	UFC on ESPN: Overeem vs. Harris	May 16, 2020	3	5:00	Jacksonville, Florida, United States	Featherweight bout.
Win	9–4	Danny Sabatello	TKO (punch to the body)	Titan FC 58	December 20, 2019	4	4:26	Fort Lauderdale, Florida, United States	Defended the Titan FC Bantamweight Championship.
Win	8–4	Matt Wagy	TKO (punch to the body)	Titan FC 55	June 28, 2019	4	4:18	Fort Lauderdale, Florida, United States	Won the interim Titan FC Bantamweight Championship. Later promoted to undisputed champion.
Win	7–4	Lazar Stojadinovic	TKO (punches and head kick)	Titan FC 53	March 15, 2019	1	1:40	Fort Lauderdale, Florida, United States	Featherweight bout.
Loss	6–4	Edir Terry	TKO (leg injury)	Titan FC 48	February 16, 2018	1	1:05	Coral Gables, Florida, United States	
Win	6–3	Chino Duran	Decision (unanimous)	Combate Americas: Combate Clasico	July 27, 2017	3	5:00	Miami, Florida, United States	
Loss	5–3	Kevin Natividad	Decision (majority)	Combate Americas: Combate 13	April 20, 2017	3	5:00	Tucson, Arizona, United States	
Loss	5–2	Jose Ceja	KO (punches)	Combate Americas: Empire Rising	October 14, 2016	1	4:22	Verona, New York, United States	
Win	5–1	Jose Ceja	Submission (rear-naked choke)	Legacy FC 52	March 25, 2016	3	4:45	Lake Charles, Louisiana, United States	
Loss	4–1	Steven Peterson	Decision (unanimous)	Legacy FC 46	October 2, 2015	3	5:00	Allen, Texas, United States	Return to Bantamweight.
Win	4–0	Adi Alić	Decision (unanimous)	Fight Time 25: It's Fight Time in the Magic City	May 29, 2015	3	5:00	Miami, Florida, United States	Featherweight debut.
Win	3–0	Chris Navarro	KO (punches)	Fight Time 23: Mayhem in Miami	February 6, 2015	1	4:58	Miami, Florida, United States	
Win	2–0	John Rivera	TKO (punches)	Fight Time 22: Autism Speaks!	December 5, 2014	1	0:34	Sunny Isles Beach, Florida, United States	
Win	1–0	Andre Cuff	Decision (split)	Fight Time 21: Soares vs. Barroso	November 7, 2014	3	5:00	Fort Lauderdale, Florida, United States	Bantamweight debut.

== See also ==
- List of male mixed martial artists
- List of Mexican UFC fighters
