= Andre Ewell =

American mixed martial artist

- Born: Andre Eugene Ewell; January 21, 1988 (age 38); Anaheim, California, United States
- Other names: Mr. Highlight
- Height: 5 ft 11 in (1.80 m)
- Weight: 145 lb (66 kg; 10 st 5 lb)
- Division: Featherweight; Bantamweight; Flyweight
- Reach: 76 in (193 cm)
- Fighting out of: Riverside, California, United States
- Team: Apex MMA; Carlson Gracie Riverside
- Years active: 2015–present

Professional boxing record
- Total: 4
- Losses: 4
- By knockout: 1

Mixed martial arts record
- Total: 28
- Wins: 18
- By knockout: 8
- By submission: 4
- By decision: 6
- Losses: 10
- By knockout: 2
- By submission: 3
- By decision: 5

Other information
- Boxing record from BoxRec
- Mixed martial arts record from Sherdog

Andre Eugene Ewell (born January 21, 1988) is an American mixed martial artist. He competed in the Featherweight division of the Ultimate Fighting Championship (UFC). He signed to Karate Combat, where he is the current Karate Combat Featherweight Champion. He also competed for Classic Entertainment and Sports (CES MMA) and is a former CES MMA Bantamweight Champion.

== Background ==
Ewell, who is a Riverside, California native, excelled in football and track and field at Arlington High School. He was offered a full scholarship to go to University of California, Los Angeles (UCLA) after his graduated from high school. However, due to his poor grades, he went to a community college instead. During his college year, inspired by Roy Jones Jr., he picked up boxing and wanted to pursue it as a career but his first few boxing matches results were disappointing. During this time, his son, Eli, was born, and due to the falling out with his child's mother and was denied for custody of his son. Ewell transitioned to mixed martial arts, hoping he could find success in the sport and could prove to the court he has value and he could be the financial provider for his son.

It's my son. Anyone who knows anything about me knows that I'm doing this for my son. I literally went bankrupt just trying to fight to be in my son's life. I had a hard year of not being in the fight and working to be in his life. Everything I had and was making was going straight to my son, but it's my son. It got to that moment that I had to do something that I honestly love, and my son's going to grow up watching that and seeing that not only am I great at it, but it's all for him.

== Mixed martial arts career ==
=== Early career ===
Without any amateur mixed martial arts fights, Ewell fought most of his early professional fights primarily in the Inland Empire area of Southern California. He competed for regional promotions Gladiator Challenge, King of the Cage (KOTC), Legacy Fighting Alliance and Classic Entertainment and Sports (CES MMA) promotions where he was the former CES MMA bantamweight champion. Ewell amassed a record of 13–4 prior signed by UFC.

=== Ultimate Fighting Championship ===
In his promotional debut, Ewell faced Renan Barão on September 22, 2018 at UFC Fight Night 137. At weigh-ins, Barão weighted five pounds over bantamweight non-title fight limit of 136 and he was fined 30 percent of his purse to Ewell. Ewell won the fight via split decision.

On December 29, 2018, Ewell faced Nathaniel Wood on December 29, 2018 at UFC 232. He lost the bout via submission in the third round.

Ewell faced Anderson dos Santos on June 22, 2019 at UFC Fight Night: Moicano vs. The Korean Zombie. He won the fight via unanimous decision.

Ewell faced Marlon Vera on October 12, 2019 at UFC Fight Night 161. He lost the fight via technical knockout.

Ewell faced Jonathan Martinez on February 8, 2020 at UFC 247. He won the fight via split decision.

Ewell faced Irwin Rivera on September 19, 2020 at UFC Fight Night 178. He won the fight via split decision.

Ewell was scheduled to face Cody Stamann, replacing Merab Dvalishvili, on February 6, 2021 at UFC Fight Night 184. During fight week, Ewell tested positive for COVID and pulled from the bout.

Ewell was quickly rescheduled and faced Chris Gutiérrez on February 13, 2021 at UFC 258. He lost the fight via unanimous decision.

Ewell faced Julio Arce on July 24, 2021 at UFC on ESPN: Sandhagen vs. Dillashaw. He lost in the second round via technical knockout.

Ewell faced Charles Jourdain on December 18, 2021 at UFC Fight Night: Lewis vs. Daukaus. He lost the bout via unanimous decision.

On February 10, 2022, it was announced that Ewell was released by UFC.

=== Post UFC ===
In his first bout after leaving the UFC, Ewell faced Drew Brokenshire on July 15, 2022 at Freedom Fight Night 2. He lost the bout via unanimous decision.

Ewell faced Brady Huang on August 20, 2022 at UNF 2. He won the bout via TKO stoppage in the first round.

== Championships and accomplishments ==
=== Mixed martial arts ===
- Classic Entertainment and Sports (CES MMA)
  - CES MMA Bantamweight Champion (One time) vs. Dinis Paiva

== Personal life ==
Ewell has a son named Eli Edward Ewell.

== Mixed martial arts record ==
Professional record breakdown
28 matches	18 wins	10 losses
By knockout	8	2
By submission	4	3
By decision	6	5

Res.	Record	Opponent	Method	Event	Date	Round	Time	Location	Notes
Win	18–10	Brady Huang	TKO (punches)	Up Next Fighting 2	August 20, 2022	1	1:52	Commerce, California, United States	
Loss	17–10	Drew Brokenshire	Decision (unanimous)	Freedom Fight Night 2	July 15, 2022	3	5:00	Mesa, Arizona, United States	
Loss	17–9	Charles Jourdain	Decision (unanimous)	UFC Fight Night: Lewis vs. Daukaus	December 18, 2021	3	5:00	Las Vegas, Nevada, United States	Return to Featherweight.
Loss	17–8	Julio Arce	TKO (punches)	UFC on ESPN: Sandhagen vs. Dillashaw	July 24, 2021	2	3:45	Las Vegas, Nevada, United States	
Loss	17–7	Chris Gutiérrez	Decision (unanimous)	UFC 258	February 13, 2021	3	5:00	Las Vegas, Nevada, United States	Catchweight (140 lb) bout.
Win	17–6	Irwin Rivera	Decision (split)	UFC Fight Night: Covington vs. Woodley	September 19, 2020	3	5:00	Las Vegas, Nevada, United States	
Win	16–6	Jonathan Martinez	Decision (split)	UFC 247	February 8, 2020	3	5:00	Houston, Texas, United States	
Loss	15–6	Marlon Vera	TKO (elbows and punches)	UFC Fight Night: Joanna vs. Waterson	October 12, 2019	3	3:17	Tampa, Florida, United States	
Win	15–5	Anderson dos Santos	Decision (unanimous)	UFC Fight Night: Moicano vs. The Korean Zombie	June 22, 2019	3	5:00	Greenville, South Carolina, United States	
Loss	14–5	Nathaniel Wood	Submission (rear-naked choke)	UFC 232	December 29, 2018	3	4:12	Inglewood, California, United States	
Win	14–4	Renan Barão	Decision (split)	UFC Fight Night: Santos vs. Anders	September 22, 2018	3	5:00	São Paulo, Brazil	Catchweight (141.8 lb) bout; Barão missed weight.
Win	13–4	Dinis Paiva	Submission (brabo choke)	CES MMA 50	June 15, 2018	3	0:36	Lincoln, Rhode Island, United States	Won the vacant CES MMA Bantamweight Championship.
Win	12–4	Trent Meaux	KO (punch)	LFA 36	March 23, 2018	1	1:41	Cabazon, California, United States	
Win	11–4	Gustavo Lopez	KO (punch)	KOTC: Energetic Pursuit	February 24, 2018	1	4:44	Ontario, California, United States	
Win	10–4	Hugo Flores	Submission (guillotine choke)	Gladiator Challenge: Season's Beatings	December 16, 2017	1	0:29	Rancho Mirage, California, United States	
Loss	9–4	Patchy Mix	Submission (rear-naked choke)	KOTC: Ultimate Mix	November 18, 2017	1	2:28	Las Vegas, Nevada, United States	Return to Bantamweight. For the vacant KOTC Flyweight Championship.
Win	9–3	Willie Gates	Submission (rear-naked choke)	KOTC: Never Quit	September 2, 2017	3	2:47	Ontario, California, United States	Flyweight debut.
Win	8–3	Chris Chavez	Submission (choke)	Gladiator Challenge: Summer Feud	June 10, 2017	1	0:27	San Jacinto, California, United States	
Win	7–3	Rick James	Decision (unanimous)	KOTC: Groundbreaking	May 6, 2017	3	5:00	San Jacinto, California, United States	Return to Bantamweight.
Win	6–3	Dominic Nichols	TKO (punches)	Gladiator Challenge: Absolute Beatdown	March 25, 2017	1	0:20	San Jacinto, California, United States	
Loss	5–3	Ryan Lilley	Decision (split)	Gladiator Challenge: Battle Cage	February 18, 2017	3	3:00	Rancho Mirage, California, United States	For the GC Bantamweight Championship.
Win	5–2	Jimmy Marquez	TKO (punches)	Gladiator Challenge: Season's Beatings	December 17, 2016	1	1:23	San Jacinto, California, United States	
Loss	4–2	Juan Beltran	Submission (choke)	Gladiator Challenge: Rampage	October 22, 2016	3	4:10	Rancho Mirage, California, United States	For the vacant GC Featherweight Championship.
Win	4–1	Mario Casares	TKO (punches)	ladiator Challenge: Wrecking Crew	April 16, 2016	1	0:42	San Jacinto, California, United States	
Loss	3–1	Jordan Winski	Decision (unanimous)	Gladiator Challenge: Young Gunz	January 30, 2016	3	3:00	San Jacinto, California, United States	Return to Featherweight.
Win	3–0	Alfredo Perez	TKO (punches)	Gladiator Challenge: California State Championship Series	October 17, 2015	2	1:30	San Jacinto, California, United States	Bantamweight debut.
Win	2–0	James Villas	Decision (unanimous)	Xplode Fight Series: Payback	September 19, 2015	3	5:00	Valley Center, California, United States	
Win	1–0	Miguelito Marti	TKO (punches)	Gladiator Challenge: Showdown	August 15, 2015	1	0:54	Rancho Mirage, California, United States	Featherweight debut.

== Bare-knuckle boxing record ==
Professional record breakdown
2 matches	1 win	1 loss
By knockout	1	1

Res.	Record	Opponent	Method	Event	Date	Round	Time	Location	Notes
Loss	1–1	Carlos Alexandre	TKO	BYB 19: Brawl in the Pines	August 10, 2023	5	2:09	Pembroke Pines, Florida, United States	For the BYB Welterweight Championship.
Win	0–1	Nicholas Villar	KO	BYB 14: Carolina Brawl	December 9, 2022	1	0:17	Rock Hill, South Carolina, United States	

== Karate Combat record ==
Professional record breakdown
5 matches	3 wins	2 losses
By knockout	2	2
By decision	1	0

Res.	Record	Opponent	Method	Event	Date	Round	Time	Location	Notes
Win	3–2	Luiz Victor Rocha	Decision (unanimous)	RCC & Karate Combat 63	October 17, 2026	5	3:00	Yekaterinburg, Russia	Won the Karate Combat Featherweight Championship.
Win	2–2	Daniel Lacerda	TKO (punches)	Karate Combat 62	July 24, 2026	1	0:18	Miami, Florida, United States	Featherweight debut.
Loss	1–2	Shahzaib Rind	KO (head kick)	Karate Combat 61	May 2, 2026	2	1:46	Miami, Florida, United States	
Win	1–1	Weber Almeida	KO (punch)	Karate Combat 57	October 31, 2025	3	2:59	Miami, Florida, United States	
Loss	0–1	Levy Saúl Marroquín	TKO (punches)	Karate Combat 44	February 23, 2024	3	2:50	Mexico City, Mexico	Lightweight debut.

== Professional boxing record ==
4 fights	0 wins	4 losses
By knockout	0	1
By decision	0	3

No.	Result	Record	Opponent	Type	Round, time	Date	Location	Notes
4	Loss	0–4	(United States) James Taylor	MD	4	24 May 2013	(United States) Bing Crosby Hall, San Diego, California, US	
3	Loss	0–3	(United States) Neil Arellano	UD	4	20 September 2012	(United States) Florentine Gardens, Hollywood, California, US	
2	Loss	0–2	(United States) Roberto Crespo	MD	4	7 June 2012	(United States) OC Fair & Event Center, Costa Mesa, California, US	
1	Loss	0–1	(United States) Terrel Williams	TKO	3 (4)	29 September 2011	(United States) Hollywood Park Casino, Inglewood, California, US	

== See also ==
- List of male mixed martial artists
