= Sam Alvey =

American mixed martial artist

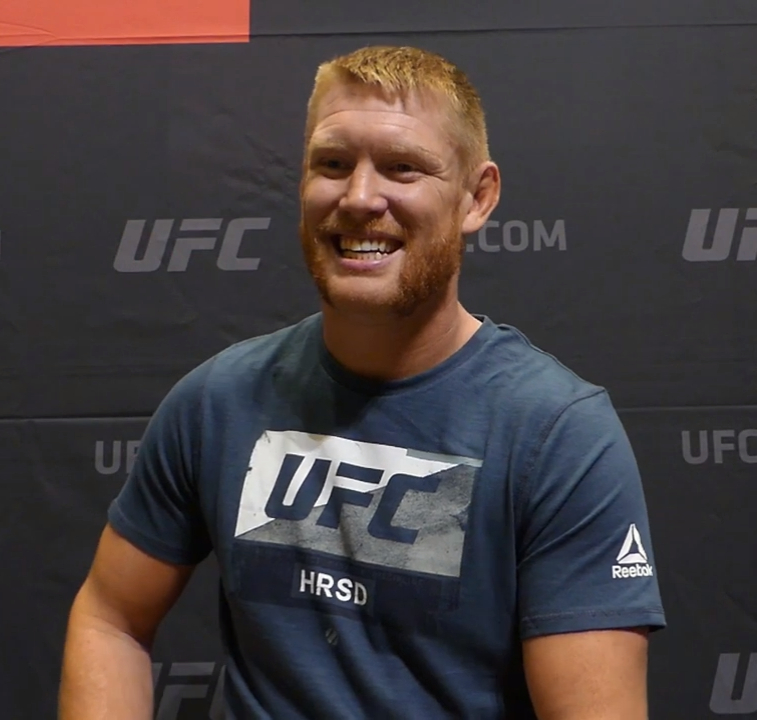
- Alvey at UFC 234 in Melbourne, Australia in February 2019
- Born: May 6, 1986 (age 40); Waterford, Wisconsin, U.S.
- Nickname: Smile'n
- Height: 6 ft 2 in (188 cm)
- Weight: 205 lb (93 kg; 14 st 9 lb)
- Division: Heavyweight (2009, 2023–present); Light Heavyweight (2018–2020); Middleweight (2008–2017, 2021–2022); Welterweight (2012)
- Reach: 75.5 in (192 cm)
- Stance: Southpaw
- Fighting out of: Murrieta, California, U.S.
- Team: Team Quest; Dan Henderson Fitness Center
- Rank: Black belt in Brazilian Jiu-Jitsu
- Years active: 2007–present (MMA)

Mixed martial arts record
- Total: 54
- Wins: 34
- By knockout: 20
- By submission: 3
- By decision: 11
- Losses: 18
- By knockout: 4
- By submission: 3
- By decision: 11
- Draws: 1
- No contests: 1

Other information
- University: Lakeland University
- Spouse: McKey Sullivan (m. 2013)
- Children: 5
- Website: samalvey.com
- Mixed martial arts record from Sherdog

Sam Alvey (born May 6, 1986) is an American professional mixed martial artist, who competed in the Middleweight division of the Ultimate Fighting Championship (UFC). He signed to Karate Combat, where he is the former Karate Combat Heavyweight Champion and the current Karate Combat Light Heavyweight Champion. A professional MMA competitor since 2008, Alvey has also formerly competed for Bellator, King of the Cage, the MFC, and was a contestant on The Ultimate Fighter 16: Team Carwin vs. Team Nelson.

== Background ==
Originally from Waterford, Wisconsin, Alvey competed in football and wrestling at Waterford Union High School and was also a talented musician. Alvey played trumpet in the school's marching band and went on to Lakeland College to play the trumpet semi-professionally. In college, Alvey began competing in pankration before eventually transitioning into a career in mixed martial arts.

== Martial arts career ==
=== Early career ===
Alvey began his amateur career in 2007, and was defeated via TKO in the second round of his first amateur bout. He rebounded to win his next two, before turning professional in July 2008. Alvey's early career took place entirely in the state of Wisconsin, where he posted an early 11–1 record, which included multiple wins in the King of the Cage promotion.

=== Bellator ===
Following a win at Light Heavyweight against Bellator MMA fighter and veteran Jason Guida, Alvey was on a three-fight winning streak and was signed by Bellator. His debut match was at Middleweight against future Bellator Welterweight Tournament Champion Karl Amoussou at Bellator 45. Early on, Amoussou bloodied Alvey with varied strikes and worked towards an armbar, though as the fight progressed, Amoussou started to tire and Alvey soon gained control of the fight in the second round and managed to secure a takedown late in the third round. After three rounds, Alvey was victorious via split decision.

Following his win over Amoussou, Alvey was named as a participant in Bellator Season Five Middleweight Tournament, where he faced Vitor Vianna. The fight saw Alvey utilize his reach advantage early in the fight, but by round two, Vianna started to control the bout, having taken Alvey down to the ground. At the end of the second round, Vianna had locked in a rear-naked choke, but time expired, allowing Alvey to make it into the third round. The third round was regarded as much closer and the fight went a decision. Alvey lost via split decision and was eliminated from the tournament.

=== The Ultimate Fighter ===
Alvey was then selected to be a part of The Ultimate Fighter: Team Carwin vs. Team Nelson, where he dropped down to welterweight for the first time. In the opening episode, he fought Leo Kuntz to get into the house. Alvey won via quick first-round knockout after a single, clean right hook. During the fighter picks, Shane Carwin selected Alvey first overall. In the third episode, Alvey was selected by Carwin to fight Joey Rivera of Team Nelson. Rivera started the fight by landing two quick head kicks and then landed a takedown. Alvey then had to defend against a guillotine choke and a triangle choke in the first round. In the second round, Alvey started to land more strikes, but was rocked by another head kick from Rivera. Though Alvey survived to go to a decision, Rivera was victorious via majority decision (19–19, 20–18, 20–18).

=== Maximum Fighting Championship ===
Alvey's MFC debut was against Elvis Mutapčić for the MFC Middleweight Championship at MFC 36. He lost via unanimous decision. Alvey defeated UFC & Bellator veteran Jay Silva at MFC 37 via TKO in round three. He then won the MFC Middleweight Championship by defeating Jason South and successfully defended it once against Wes Swofford before moving to the UFC.

=== Ultimate Fighting Championship ===
In June 2014, it was announced that Alvey had signed with the UFC. He made his debut on August 16, 2014, against Tom Watson at UFC Fight Night 47. He lost the back-and-forth fight via unanimous decision.

For his second fight with the promotion, Alvey faced Dylan Andrews on November 8, 2014, at UFC Fight Night 55. He won the fight via knockout due to punches in the first round.

Alvey faced Cezar Ferreira on February 22, 2015, at UFC Fight Night 61. Alvey won the fight via knockout in the first round. Subsequently, Alvey won a Performance of the Night bonus.

Alvey faced Dan Kelly on May 10, 2015, at UFC Fight Night 65. Alvey won the fight via TKO in the first round.

Alvey faced Derek Brunson on August 8, 2015, at UFC Fight Night 73. He lost the fight by TKO in the first round.

Alvey was expected to face Daniel Sarafian on February 21, 2016, at UFC Fight Night 83. However, Alvey pulled out of the bout in late December after sustaining a broken jaw and was replaced by Oluwale Bamgbose.

Alvey next faced Elias Theodorou on June 18, 2016, at UFC Fight Night 89. The bout remained on the feet for nearly all of its duration in a largely uneventful fight where neither fighter was able to deliver any significant offense. He lost the fight via unanimous decision.

After sustaining virtually no damage during his previous fight, Alvey was quickly rescheduled and faced promotional newcomer Eric Spicely on July 13, 2016, at UFC Fight Night 91. He won the fight via submission in first round.

Alvey competed in his third bout in three months as he faced Kevin Casey on August 27, 2016, at UFC on Fox 21. He won the fight via TKO in the second round.

Alvey again made a quick return to the cage and faced Alex Nicholson on November 5, 2016, at The Ultimate Fighter Latin America 3 Finale. He won the fight by unanimous decision.

Alvey faced Nate Marquardt on January 28, 2017, at UFC on Fox 23. He won the fight via unanimous decision.

Alvey faced Thales Leites on April 22, 2017, at UFC Fight Night 108. He lost the fight via unanimous decision.

Alvey faced Rashad Evans on August 5, 2017, at UFC Fight Night 114. He won the fight by split decision.

Alvey was tabbed as a short notice replacement for Trevor Smith and faced Ramazan Emeev on 21 October 2017 at UFC Fight Night: Cowboy vs. Till. At the weigh ins, Alvey missed the middleweight limit of 185 pounds, coming in at 189 pounds. As a result, his bout with Emeev was changed to a catchweight and Alvey was fined 20% of his purse. He lost the fight via unanimous decision.

==== Move up to Light Heavyweight and losing streak ====
Alvey faced promotional newcomer Marcin Prachnio in a light heavyweight bout on February 24, 2018, at UFC on Fox 28. He won the fight via knockout in the first round.

Alvey faced Gian Villante on June 1, 2018, at UFC Fight Night 131. He won the fight by split decision.

Alvey faced Antônio Rogério Nogueira on September 22, 2018, at UFC Fight Night 137. He lost the fight via knockout in the second round.

Alvey faced Jimmy Crute on February 10, 2019, at UFC 234. He lost the fight via technical knockout in round one.

Alvey faced Klidson Abreu on July 20, 2019, at UFC on ESPN 4. He lost the fight via unanimous decision.

Alvey was expected to face Maurício Rua on November 16, 2019, at UFC Fight Night 164. However, Alvey was removed from the fight on October 25 due to a broken hand and was replaced by Paul Craig.

Alvey was expected to return to action against Khalil Rountree Jr. on March 28, 2020, at UFC on ESPN: Ngannou vs. Rozenstruik. Due to the COVID-19 pandemic, the event was postponed.

Alvey faced Ryan Spann May 9, 2020, at UFC 249. He lost the fight via split decision.

Alvey faced Jung Da Un on October 24, 2020 at UFC 254. After a back and forth battle, the fight was declared a split draw. 17 out of 21 media outlets scored the bout for Alvey.

==== Return to Middleweight and departure ====
Alvey was expected to move down to middleweight division to face Zak Cummings on April 10, 2021, at UFC on ABC 2. However, Cummings pulled out of the bout in mid-March and was replaced by Julian Marquez. After getting knocked down, he lost the bout via second round rear-naked choke. This bout earned him a Fight of the Night award.

Alvey was scheduled to face Roman Kopylov on July 31, 2021, at UFC on ESPN 28. However, Kopylov wasn't able to obtain his US visa in time and the bout was scrapped.

Alvey faced Wellington Turman on August 28, 2021, at UFC on ESPN 30. Alvey was poked in the eye multiple times throughout the fight, with Turman being deducted two points, however Alvey lost the fight via split decision.

Alvey was scheduled to face Ian Heinisch on February 5, 2022, at UFC Fight Night 200. Heinisch pulled out due to undisclosed reasons in late December and was replaced by Phil Hawes. In turn Hawes withdrew from the bout due to an undisclosed injury and he was replaced by Brendan Allen, with the fight taking place at light heavyweight. Alvey lost the fight via rear-naked choke submission in round two.

Alvey faced Michał Oleksiejczuk on August 6, 2022, at UFC on ESPN 40. He lost the fight via technical knockout in round one. With this loss, Alvey extended his winless streak to nine fights in a row, breaking the previous record set by B.J. Penn.

On August 10, 2022, it was announced that Alvey had fought out his contract, and the promotion opted not to renew it.

=== Post UFC ===
Alvey faced Cameron Graham on May 27, 2023, at B2 Fighting Series 183 in his heavyweight debut and won by TKO marking his first win in nearly five years in mixed martial arts.

=== Karate Combat ===
Alvey faced Adam Rosa on September 16, 2023 at Karate Combat 41 and won by knockout.

Alvey faced Ross Levine on December 16, 2023, at Karate Combat 43 in a 6-round heavyweight bout that resulted in Sam Alvey becoming the inaugural Heavyweight Champion of the organisation after a decision win via sudden death 6th round.

Alvey faced on Antônio Arroyo on March 23, 2024 at Karate Combat Kickback 2 and the bout ended in a no contest as a result of an accidental headbutt which rendered Alvey unable to continue.

Alvey defended his title against Antônio Arroyo in a rematch on July 25, 2024 at Karate Combat 48. He won by technical knockout in the fourth round.

During the broadcast of Karate Combat 53, it was announced that Alvey would defend his title against former WFCA cruiserweight champion, Glory 95kg Slam Champion and It's Showtime 95MAX World champion Tyrone Spong at Karate Combat 54 in Dubai on May 2, 2025. He won the fight by knockout in the second round.

Alvey faced Robelis Despaigne at Karate Combat 58 on December 5, 2025 and lost the championship by knockout in the second round.

Moving down to Light Heavyweight, Alvey faced Uriah Hall on July 24, 2026, at Karate Combat 62 in a 5-round championship bout for the inaugural Karate Combat Light Heavyweight Championship. He won the fight and the title via unanimous decision.

== Personal life ==
Alvey has four biological children with his wife McKey Sullivan, winner of the eleventh cycle of America's Next Top Model. In early 2021, they also legally adopted their foster daughter.

== Championships and accomplishments ==
=== Full contact karate ===
- Karate Combat
  - Karate Combat Heavyweight Champion (One time; Inaugural; former)
    - Two successful title defenses
  - Karate Combat Light Heavyweight Champion (One time; inaugural; current)
  - Tied (Edgars Skrivers, Eoghan Chelmiah, Luiz Victor Rocha and Ross Levine) for most title defenses (2)
  - Tied (Luiz Victor Rocha) for most title wins (4)

=== Mixed martial arts ===
- Maximum Fighting Championship
  - MFC Middleweight Champion (One time)
- Ultimate Fighting Championship
  - Performance of the Night (One time) vs. Cezar Ferreira
  - Fight of the Night (One time) vs. Julian Marquez
  - Tied (Donald Cerrone & Waldo Cortes-Acosta) for second most fights in a period of 12 months (6)
  - Longest winless streak in UFC history (9)

== Mixed martial arts record ==
Professional record breakdown
54 matches	34 wins	18 losses
By knockout	20	4
By submission	3	3
By decision	11	11
Draws	1	
No contests	1	

Res.	Record	Opponent	Method	Event	Date	Round	Time	Location	Notes
Win	34–18–1 (1)	Cameron Graham	TKO (punches)	B2 Fighting Series 183	May 27, 2023	3	4:24	Columbus, Georgia, United States	Heavyweight debut.
Loss	33–18–1 (1)	Michał Oleksiejczuk	TKO (punches)	UFC on ESPN: Santos vs. Hill	August 6, 2022	1	1:56	Las Vegas, Nevada, United States	
Loss	33–17–1 (1)	Brendan Allen	Submission (rear-naked choke)	UFC Fight Night: Hermansson vs. Strickland	February 5, 2022	2	2:10	Las Vegas, Nevada, United States	Light Heavyweight bout.
Loss	33–16–1 (1)	Wellington Turman	Decision (split)	UFC on ESPN: Barboza vs. Chikadze	August 28, 2021	3	5:00	Las Vegas, Nevada, United States	Turman was twice deducted one point in round 3 due to repeated eye pokes.
Loss	33–15–1 (1)	Julian Marquez	Technical Submission (rear-naked choke)	UFC on ABC: Vettori vs. Holland	April 10, 2021	2	2:07	Las Vegas, Nevada, United States	Return to Middleweight. Fight of the Night.
Draw	33–14–1 (1)	Da Un Jung	Draw (split)	UFC 254	October 24, 2020	3	5:00	Abu Dhabi, United Arab Emirates	
Loss	33–14 (1)	Ryan Spann	Decision (split)	UFC 249	May 9, 2020	3	5:00	Jacksonville, Florida, United States	
Loss	33–13 (1)	Klidson Abreu	Decision (unanimous)	UFC on ESPN: dos Anjos vs. Edwards	July 20, 2019	3	5:00	San Antonio, Texas, United States	
Loss	33–12 (1)	Jimmy Crute	TKO (punches)	UFC 234	February 10, 2019	1	2:49	Melbourne, Australia	
Loss	33–11 (1)	Antônio Rogério Nogueira	TKO (punches)	UFC Fight Night: Santos vs. Anders	September 22, 2018	2	1:00	São Paulo, Brazil	
Win	33–10 (1)	Gian Villante	Decision (split)	UFC Fight Night: Rivera vs. Moraes	June 1, 2018	3	5:00	Utica, New York, United States	
Win	32–10 (1)	Marcin Prachnio	KO (punch)	UFC on Fox: Emmett vs. Stephens	February 24, 2018	1	4:23	Orlando, Florida, United States	Light Heavyweight debut.
Loss	31–10 (1)	Ramazan Emeev	Decision (unanimous)	UFC Fight Night: Cowboy vs. Till	October 21, 2017	3	5:00	Gdańsk, Poland	Catchweight (189 lb) bout; Alvey missed weight.
Win	31–9 (1)	Rashad Evans	Decision (split)	UFC Fight Night: Pettis vs. Moreno	August 5, 2017	3	5:00	Mexico City, Mexico	
Loss	30–9 (1)	Thales Leites	Decision (unanimous)	UFC Fight Night: Swanson vs. Lobov	April 22, 2017	3	5:00	Nashville, Tennessee, United States	
Win	30–8 (1)	Nate Marquardt	Decision (unanimous)	UFC on Fox: Shevchenko vs. Peña	January 28, 2017	3	5:00	Denver, Colorado, United States	
Win	29–8 (1)	Alex Nicholson	Decision (unanimous)	The Ultimate Fighter Latin America 3 Finale	November 5, 2016	3	5:00	Mexico City, Mexico	
Win	28–8 (1)	Kevin Casey	TKO (punches)	UFC on Fox: Maia vs. Condit	August 27, 2016	2	4:56	Vancouver, British Columbia, Canada	
Win	27–8 (1)	Eric Spicely	Submission (guillotine choke)	UFC Fight Night: McDonald vs. Lineker	July 13, 2016	1	2:43	Sioux Falls, South Dakota, United States	
Loss	26–8 (1)	Elias Theodorou	Decision (unanimous)	UFC Fight Night: MacDonald vs. Thompson	June 18, 2016	3	5:00	Ottawa, Ontario, Canada	
Loss	26–7 (1)	Derek Brunson	TKO (punches)	UFC Fight Night: Teixeira vs. Saint Preux	August 8, 2015	1	2:19	Nashville, Tennessee, United States	
Win	26–6 (1)	Dan Kelly	TKO (punches)	UFC Fight Night: Miocic vs. Hunt	May 10, 2015	1	0:49	Adelaide, Australia	
Win	25–6 (1)	Cezar Ferreira	KO (punches)	UFC Fight Night: Bigfoot vs. Mir	February 22, 2015	1	3:34	Porto Alegre, Brazil	Performance of the Night.
Win	24–6 (1)	Dylan Andrews	KO (punches)	UFC Fight Night: Rockhold vs. Bisping	November 8, 2014	1	2:16	Sydney, Australia	
Loss	23–6 (1)	Tom Watson	Decision (unanimous)	UFC Fight Night: Bader vs. St. Preux	August 16, 2014	3	5:00	Bangor, Maine, United States	
Win	23–5 (1)	Gerald Meerschaert	Decision (unanimous)	NAFC: Mega Brawl	May 31, 2014	3	5:00	Milwaukee, Wisconsin, United States	
Win	22–5 (1)	Wes Swofford	KO (punch)	MFC 40	May 9, 2014	4	1:02	Edmonton, Alberta, Canada	Defended the MFC Middleweight Championship.
Win	21–5 (1)	Jason South	TKO (punches)	MFC 38	October 4, 2013	5	4:56	Edmonton, Alberta, Canada	Won the vacant MFC Middleweight Championship.
Win	20–5 (1)	Jay Silva	TKO (punches)	MFC 37	May 10, 2013	3	1:05	Edmonton, Alberta, Canada	Catchweight (186.6 lb) bout; Silva missed weight.
Loss	19–5 (1)	Elvis Mutapčić	Decision (unanimous)	MFC 36	February 15, 2013	5	5:00	Edmonton, Alberta, Canada	For the MFC Middleweight Championship.
Win	19–4 (1)	Lucas Lopes	TKO (punches)	ShoFight 20	June 16, 2012	1	1:39	Springfield, Missouri, United States	
Win	18–4 (1)	Daniel Almeida	TKO (knee injury)	Wreck MMA: Road to Glory	April 20, 2012	1	1:41	Gatineau, Quebec, Canada	Catchweight (190 lb) bout.
Loss	17–4 (1)	Brandon Ropati	Decision (majority)	ICNZ 16	March 3, 2012	3	5:00	Auckland, New Zealand	
Win	17–3 (1)	Eddie Larrea	TKO (punches)	Madtown Throwdown 26	January 7, 2012	1	4:39	Madison, Wisconsin, United States	
Win	16–3 (1)	Augusto Montaño	Decision (unanimous)	Chihuahua Extremo	November 5, 2011	3	5:00	Chihuahua, Mexico	
Loss	15–3 (1)	Vitor Vianna	Decision (split)	Bellator 50	September 17, 2011	3	5:00	Hollywood, Florida, United States	Bellator Season 5 Middleweight Tournament Quarterfinal.
Win	15–2 (1)	Karl Amoussou	Decision (split)	Bellator 45	May 21, 2011	3	5:00	Lake Charles, Louisiana, United States	
Win	14–2 (1)	Jason Guida	Decision (split)	NAFC: Bad Blood	November 24, 2010	3	5:00	Milwaukee, Wisconsin, United States	
Win	13–2 (1)	Luke Taylor	Decision (unanimous)	Caribbean Ultimate Fist Fighting 1	October 23, 2010	3	5:00	Port of Spain, Trinidad and Tobago	
Win	12–2 (1)	William Hill	KO (punch)	KOTC: High Profile	October 9, 2010	2	2:22	Lac Du Flambeau, Wisconsin, United States	
Loss	11–2 (1)	Gerald Meerschaert	Submission (guillotine choke)	Combat USA: Championship Tournament Finals	September 11, 2010	5	4:08	Green Bay, Wisconsin, United States	
NC	11–1 (1)	Paul Bradley	No Contest	KOTC: Chain Reaction	July 17, 2010	0	0:00	Lac Du Flambeau, Wisconsin, United States	Fight stopped due to rainfall.
Win	11–1	Pat O'Malley	KO (punches)	Combat USA 21	February 22, 2010	1	2:49	Green Bay, Wisconsin, United States	
Win	10–1	Brad Resop	Submission (rear-naked choke)	Combat USA 17	February 22, 2010	1	3:40	Green Bay, Wisconsin, United States	
Win	9–1	Eric Hammerich	TKO (punches)	Madtown Throwdown 22	January 9, 2010	1	4:05	Madison, Wisconsin, United States	
Win	8–1	Demian Decorah	Decision (unanimous)	Racine Fight Night 5	November 28, 2009	5	5:00	Racine, Wisconsin, United States	
Win	7–1	Mark Honneger	TKO (doctor stoppage)	Madtown Throwdown 20	August 1, 2009	4	5:00	Madison, Wisconsin, United States	
Win	6–1	Ron Carter	Decision (unanimous)	KOTC: Connection	July 18, 2009	3	3:00	Lac Du Flambeau, Wisconsin, United States	
Win	5–1	Tre Mittnecht	TKO (punches)	Wisconsin Cage Fighting 1: Battle at the Bleachers	June 20, 2009	1	4:41	Wind Lake, Wisconsin, United States	
Loss	4–1	Caleb Nelson	Decision (unanimous)	First Strike	May 2, 2009	3	3:00	Manitowoc, Wisconsin United States	
Win	4–0	Jason Sink	TKO (punches)	KOTC: Insanity	April 4, 2009	1	1:10	Lac Du Flambeau, Wisconsin, United States	
Win	3–0	Justin Lemke	TKO (punches)	Racine Fight Night 2	February 28, 2009	2	2:31	Racine, Wisconsin, United States	
Win	2–0	Lukas Bowar	TKO (punches)	Racine Fight Night 1	November 29, 2008	1	N/A	Racine, Wisconsin, United States	
Win	1–0	Shane Malchiodi	Submission (kimura)	KOTC: Rock Solid	July 19, 2008	2	1:19	Lac Du Flambeau, Wisconsin, United States	

=== Mixed martial arts exhibition record ===
Exhibition record breakdown		
2 matches	1 win	1 loss
By knockout	1	0
By decision	0	1

Res.	Record	Opponent	Method	Event	Date	Round	Time	Location	Notes
Loss	1–1	Joey Rivera	Decision (majority)	The Ultimate Fighter: Team Carwin vs. Team Nelson	September 28, 2012 (airdate)	2	5:00	Las Vegas, Nevada, United States	The Ultimate Fighter 16 Preliminary round.
Win	1–0	Leo Kuntz	KO (punch)	The Ultimate Fighter: Team Carwin vs. Team Nelson	September 14, 2012 (airdate)	1	0:47	Las Vegas, Nevada, United States	The Ultimate Fighter 16 TUF House entry bout.

== Karate Combat record ==
Professional record breakdown
7 matches	5 wins	1 loss
By knockout	3	1
By decision	2	0
No contests	1	

Res.	Record	Opponent	Method	Event	Date	Round	Time	Location	Notes
Win	5–1 (1)	Uriah Hall	Decision (unanimous)	Karate Combat 62	July 24, 2026	5	3:00	Miami, Florida	Light Heavyweight debut. Won the inaugural Karate Combat Light Heavyweight Championship.
Loss	4–1 (1)	Robelis Despaigne	KO (head kick)	Karate Combat 58	December 5, 2025	2	2:07	Doral, Florida, United States	Lost the Karate Combat Heavyweight Championship.
Win	4–0 (1)	Tyrone Spong	KO (punches)	Karate Combat 54	May 2, 2025	2	1:43	Dubai, United Arab Emirates	Defended the Karate Combat Heavyweight Championship.
Win	3–0 (1)	Antônio Arroyo	TKO (punches)	Karate Combat 48	July 25, 2024	4	2:33	Nashville, Tennessee, United States	Defended the Karate Combat Heavyweight Championship.
NC	2–0 (1)	Antônio Arroyo	NC (accidental headbutt)	Karate Combat Kickback 2	March 23, 2024	2	1:34	Cancun, Quintana Roo, Mexico	Retained the Karate Combat Heavyweight Championship. Accidental headbutt rendered Alvey unable to continue.
Win	2–0	Ross Levine	Decision (unanimous)	Karate Combat 43	December 15, 2023	6	3:00	Las Vegas, Nevada, United States	Won the inaugural Karate Combat Heavyweight Championship.
Win	1–0	Adam Ramos	TKO (punches)	Karate Combat 41	September 16, 2023	1	1:43	La Romana, Dominican Republic	

== See also ==
- List of male mixed martial artists
