= Kozaklı =

- Municipality
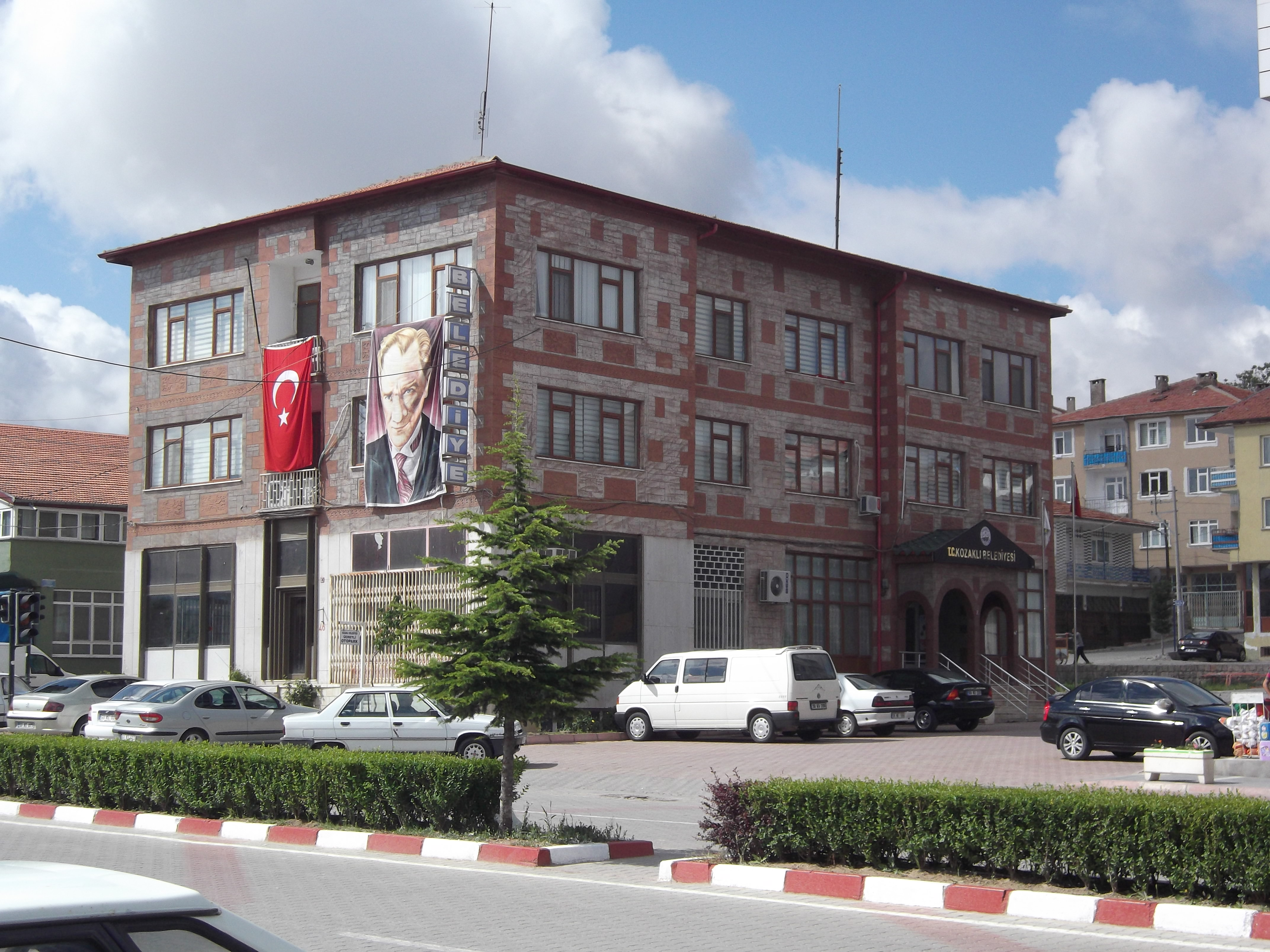
- Town hall

- Location within Turkey Location within Turkey Central Anatolia
- Coordinates: 39°13′N 34°51′E
- Country: Turkey
- Province: Nevşehir
- District: Kozaklı

Government
  - Mayor: Sefer Neslihanoğlu (CHP)
- Elevation: 1,041 m (3,415 ft)
- Population (2022): 7,589
- Time zone: UTC+3 (TRT)
- Postal code: 50600
- Area code: 0384
- Climate: Csb
- Website: www.kozakli.bel.tr

Kozaklı, formerly Hamamorta and Kisla, is a town in Nevşehir Province in the Central Anatolia region of Turkey. It is the seat of Kozaklı District. Its population is 7,589 (2022). Located in Cappadocia, its average elevation is 1,041 m (3,415 ft). Due to its central situation to the nearest larger cities like Nevşehir, Kayseri, Yozgat, Niğde and Kırşehir (within 100 km (62 mi) distance), and particularly due to its natural spas, hamams and hotel facilities, Kozaklı has been a popular resort in Central Anatolia.

== Neighbourhoods ==
The town of Kozaklı consists of the following neighbourhoods: Altınsu, Bahçelievler, Emek, Yeni, Hamamorta, Buruncuk, Bağlıca, Kızılkoyunlu, Hoca Ahmet Yesevi and Yabanlı.
