= UFC on ESPN: Sandhagen vs. Dillashaw =

Mixed martial arts event in 2021

- The poster for UFC on ESPN: Sandhagen vs. Dillashaw
- Promotion: Ultimate Fighting Championship
- Date: July 24, 2021
- Venue: UFC Apex
- City: Enterprise, Nevada
- Attendance: 51

Event chronology
UFC on ESPN: Makhachev vs. Moisés	UFC on ESPN: Sandhagen vs. Dillashaw	UFC on ESPN: Hall vs. Strickland

UFC on ESPN: Sandhagen vs. Dillashaw (also known as UFC on ESPN 27 and UFC Vegas 32) was a mixed martial arts event produced by the Ultimate Fighting Championship that took place on July 24, 2021, at the UFC Apex facility in Enterprise, Nevada, part of the Las Vegas Metropolitan Area, United States.

== Background ==
51 VIP premium packages were sold at $2000 each to a selected number of people who could attend the event. This was the first time fans were allowed to attend UFC events at the UFC Apex. These VIP packages were sold for subsequent events at the venue as well.

A bantamweight bout between former two-time UFC Bantamweight Champion T.J. Dillashaw and Cory Sandhagen served as the event headliner. It was Dillashaw's first fight since his two-year suspension due to testing positive for recombinant human erythropoietin (EPO), which resulted in his title vacancy. They were expected to serve as the headliner of UFC on ESPN: Rodriguez vs. Waterson, but the bout was postponed after Dillashaw got injured due to a cut sustained from a headbutt.

Raphael Assunção and Kyler Phillips were scheduled to meet in a bantamweight bout. However, Assunção suffered a biceps injury in late June and was replaced by Raulian Paiva.

Priscila Cachoeira was linked to a bout with Sijara Eubanks at the event. However, the pairing was never officially announced by the promotion and Eubanks faced promotional newcomer Elise Reed instead.

Bantamweight pairings of Trevin Jones vs. Tony Kelley and Aaron Phillips vs. Cameron Else were scheduled for the event. However, on July 4, Kelly withdrew from the bout for unknown reasons and subsequently, Else was removed for undisclosed reasons in mid-July. As a result, Phillips was expected to face Jones on the card. However, on July 18, Phillips had to withdraw from the bout and Jones was moved to UFC on ESPN: Hall vs. Strickland against Ronnie Lawrence.

A heavyweight bout between Shamil Abdurakhimov and Chris Daukaus was initially scheduled for this event. However, the matchup was removed from the card on July 19 due to COVID-19 protocols within Abdurakhimov's camp. The pairing was expected to be left intact and take place one week later at UFC on ESPN: Hall vs. Strickland, but it was postponed again and took place at UFC 266.

A women's bantamweight bout between Aspen Ladd and The Ultimate Fighter: Heavy Hitters featherweight winner Macy Chiasson was expected to take place at the event. However, the bout was scrapped during fight week due to Chiasson suffering a stress fracture on her foot.

== Results ==
Main card (ESPN / ESPN+)
Weight class				Method	Round	Time	Notes
Bantamweight	T.J. Dillashaw	def.	Cory Sandhagen	Decision (split) (47–48, 48–47, 48–47)	5	5:00
Bantamweight	Raulian Paiva	def.	Kyler Phillips	Decision (majority) (29–28, 29–28, 28–28)	3	5:00
Featherweight	Darren Elkins	def.	Darrick Minner	TKO (punches)	2	3:48
Women’s Flyweight	Maycee Barber	def.	Miranda Maverick	Decision (split) (28–29, 29–28, 29–28)	3	5:00
Bantamweight	Adrian Yañez	def.	Randy Costa	TKO (punches)	2	2:11
Preliminary card (ESPN / ESPN+)
Middleweight	Brendan Allen	def.	Punahele Soriano	Decision (unanimous) (30–27, 30–27, 29–28)	3	5:00
Middleweight	Nassourdine Imavov	def.	Ian Heinisch	TKO (punches)	2	3:09
Welterweight	Mickey Gall	def.	Jordan Williams	Submission (rear-naked choke)	1	2:57
Bantamweight	Julio Arce	def.	Andre Ewell	TKO (punches)	2	3:45
Women’s Flyweight	Sijara Eubanks	def.	Elise Reed	TKO (punches)	1	3:49
Women’s Strawweight	Diana Belbiţă	def.	Hannah Goldy	Decision (unanimous) (30–27, 30–27, 30–27)	3	5:00

== Bonus awards ==
The following fighters received $50,000 bonuses.

- Fight of the Night: Raulian Paiva vs. Kyler Phillips
- Performance of the Night: Darren Elkins and Adrian Yañez

== See also ==
- List of UFC events
- List of current UFC fighters
- 2021 in UFC
