= Deron Winn =

American mixed martial arts fighter and freestyle wrestler

- Born: June 13, 1989 (age 37); Liberty, Missouri, U.S.
- Height: 5 ft 6 in (1.68 m)
- Weight: 186 lb (84 kg; 13.3 st)
- Division: Middleweight (2019–present); Light heavyweight (2017–2018)
- Reach: 70 in (178 cm)
- Style: Wrestling
- Fighting out of: Gilroy, California, U.S.
- Team: American Kickboxing Academy (2015–present)
- Wrestling: Freestyle wrestling NAIA Wrestling
- Years active: 2017–present

Mixed martial arts record
- Total: 10
- Wins: 7
- By knockout: 4
- By decision: 3
- Losses: 3
- By knockout: 1
- By submission: 1
- By decision: 1

Other information
- University: Lindenwood University
- Notable schools: St. Louis Community College; Liberty High School
- Mixed martial arts record from Sherdog
Medal record
Men's freestyle wrestling
Representing United States
Pan American Championships
Bronze medal – third place	2014 Mexico City	97 kg
Men's collegiate wrestling
Representing the Lindenwood Lions
NAIA Championships
Bronze medal – third place	2011 Cedar Rapids	197 lb
Representing the Meramec Archers
NJCAA Championships
Gold medal – first place	2008 Rochester	184 lb
Gold medal – first place	2010 Des Moines	184 lb

Deron Winn (born June 13, 1989) is an American mixed martial artist, freestyle wrestler and bare-kncukle boxer. A professional mixed martial artist since 2017, he formerly competed with the Ultimate Fighting Championship (UFC) and Bellator MMA, fighting in their middleweight divisions.

== Background and wrestling career ==
Winn was born and raised in Liberty, Missouri. He began wrestling for Liberty High School, where he became a three-time MSHSAA state champion and compiled a record of 163–6.

After high school, Winn attended St. Louis Community College–Meramec where he won the NJCAA national junior college championship and earned the NJCAA Outstanding Wrestler award as a true freshman. In his sophomore year he was awarded All-American status.

Following his career at St. Louis Community College, in his senior year he transferred to the wrestling program of Lindenwood University where he earned NAIA All-American honors by advancing to the NAIA Wrestling Championships, where he placed third at nationals.

After his successful collegiate wrestling career, he focused in freestyle wrestling, where he competed nationally and internationally, compiled wins over notable wrestlers such as J'den Cox and Pat Downey and also placed at competitions such as the US Open, the Pan American Championships and the US World Team Trials. After more than two years since his last wrestling showdown, Winn wrestled the heavily accomplished in collegiate wrestling Kollin Moore on August 30, 2020, at Chael Sonnen's Wrestling Underground I. He lost the match by decision.

== Mixed martial arts career ==
=== Early career ===
After failing to make it to the 2016 Summer Olympics wrestling team, Winn relocated to California in 2016 to continue training mixed martial arts. He began his professional career in 2017 and fought under various promotions, most notably Bellator MMA. He amassed an undefeated record of 5–0 with all but one of his wins ending by knockout in the first round. On December 20, 2018, it was announced that Winn had signed with the UFC.

=== Ultimate Fighting Championship ===
Winn was scheduled to make his promotional debut against Markus Perez on June 22, 2019, at UFC Fight Night 154. However, on May 9 it was reported that Perez had pulled out of the fight citing injury and was replaced by Bruno Silva. On June 16, it was reported that Silva was forced to pull out of the contest due to a potential anti-doping violation by USADA and was replaced by returning veteran Eric Spicely. He won the fight by unanimous decision. This win earned both competitors the Fight of the Night award.

Winn faced Darren Stewart on October 18, 2019, at UFC on ESPN 6. At the weigh-in, Winn weighed in at 188.5 pounds, 2.5 pounds over the middleweight non-title fight limit of 186. The bout was held at catchweight and he was fined 20% of his purse which went to his opponent. He lost the fight by split decision.

Winn faced Gerald Meerschaert on March 7, 2020, at UFC 248. He lost the fight via submission in the third round. Winn was suspended for nine months and fined $1,800 of his purse by the Nevada State Athletic Commission on September 3, 2020, after testing positive for amphetamines. The suspension was retroactive to March 7, 2020, and he became eligible to compete again on December 7, 2020.

Winn was scheduled to face Antônio Braga Neto on December 19, 2020, at UFC Fight Night: Thompson vs. Neal. However, Braga Neto was removed from the contest due to undisclosed reasons and replaced by Antônio Arroyo. Winn won the fight via unanimous decision.

Winn was scheduled to face Phil Hawes at UFC on ESPN 26 on July 17, 2021. However, Winn was forced to pull out from the event, citing separated rib and torn cartilage, and the bout was rescheduled at UFC Fight Night 194 on October 9, 2021. In turn, Winn withdrew the day before the event due to health issues. He was briefly expected to be replaced by Chris Curtis, however Hawes declined the bout and it was ultimately scrapped.

Winn faced Phil Hawes on June 18, 2022, at UFC on ESPN 37. He lost the bout in the second round via standing TKO stoppage.

Winn was scheduled to face Julian Marquez on December 17, 2022, at UFC Fight Night 216. However, just two days before the event, Winn was forced to withdraw after fainting and falling down a set of stairs, at the UFC Performance Institute, sustaining a minor concussion. Approximately one week later, Winn was released from his UFC contract.

== Submission grappling career ==
Winn was scheduled to face Pat Downey in a no gi submission grappling superfight at Spokane Submission Series 4 on March 1, 2025. Both Winn and Downey withdrew from the match for undisclosed reasons.

== Bare-knuckle boxing ==
Winn is scheduled to make his debut with Bare Knuckle Fighting Championship against Erick Lozano on April 17, 2026 at BKFC 88.

== Personal life ==
Winn is in a relationship with fellow mixed martial artist Mallory Martin.

He has openly talked about his late father's homelessness and alcoholism, and his older brother's drug addiction.

== Championships and accomplishments ==
=== Mixed martial arts ===
- Ultimate Fighting Championship
  - Fight of the Night (One time) vs. Eric Spicely

=== Freestyle wrestling ===
Sources:

- United World Wrestling
  - 2018 Bill Ferrell International Senior Freestyle Silver Medalist
  - 2016 Dave Schultz Memorial International Open Senior Freestyle Silver Medalist
  - 2016 Outstanding Ukrainian Memorial Open Senior Freestyle Bronze Medalist
  - 2014 Pan American Championships Senior Freestyle Bronze Medalist
  - 2014 Dave Schultz Memorial International Open Senior Freestyle Silver Medalist
  - 2014 Bill Farrell International Open Senior Freestyle Silver Medalist
  - 2013 Cerro Pelado International Senior Freestyle Bronze Medalist
- USA Wrestling
  - 2018 World Team Trials Challenge Tournament Senior Freestyle Silver Medalist
  - 2018 U.S. Open Senior Freestyle 4th Place
  - 2015 U.S. Open Senior Freestyle 4th Place
  - 2014 U.S. Open Senior Freestyle 4th Place
  - 2014 U.S. World Team Trials Open Senior Freestyle 4th Place

=== Folkstyle Wrestling ===
- National Association of Intercollegiate Athletics
  - NAIA 197 lb 3rd place out of Lindenwood University (2011)
  - NAIA All-American out of Lindenwood University (2011)
- National Junior College Athletic Association
  - NJCAA 184 lb National Championship out of St. Louis Community College (2008, 2010)
  - NJCAA All-American out of St. Louis Community College (2008, 2010)
  - NJCAA Most Outstanding Wrestler out of St. Louis Community College (2008)
- Missouri State High School Activities Association
  - MSHSAA State Championship out of Liberty High School (2005, 2006, 2007)
  - MSHSAA All-State out of Liberty High School (2004, 2005, 2006, 2007)

== Mixed martial arts record ==
Professional record breakdown
10 matches	7 wins	3 losses
By knockout	4	1
By submission	0	1
By decision	3	1

Res.	Record	Opponent	Method	Event	Date	Round	Time	Location	Notes
Loss	7–3	Phil Hawes	TKO (elbows)	UFC on ESPN: Kattar vs. Emmett	June 18, 2022	2	4:25	Austin, Texas, United States	
Win	7–2	Antônio Arroyo	Decision (unanimous)	UFC Fight Night: Thompson vs. Neal	December 19, 2020	3	5:00	Las Vegas, Nevada, United States	Catchweight (195 lb) bout.
Loss	6–2	Gerald Meerschaert	Submission (rear-naked choke)	UFC 248	March 7, 2020	3	2:13	Las Vegas, Nevada, United States	Winn tested positive for amphetamines.
Loss	6–1	Darren Stewart	Decision (split)	UFC on ESPN: Reyes vs. Weidman	October 18, 2019	3	5:00	Boston, Massachusetts, United States	Catchweight (188.5 lb) bout; Winn missed weight.
Win	6–0	Eric Spicely	Decision (unanimous)	UFC Fight Night: Moicano vs. The Korean Zombie	June 22, 2019	3	5:00	Greenville, South Carolina, United States	Middleweight debut. Fight of the Night.
Win	5–0	Tom Lawlor	Decision (unanimous)	Golden Boy Promotions: Liddell vs. Ortiz 3	November 24, 2018	3	5:00	Inglewood, California, United States	
Win	4–0	Ahmed White	TKO (punches)	Bellator 199	May 12, 2018	1	2:32	San Jose, California, United States	
Win	3–0	Cody Sons	TKO (punches)	URCC 32 Fury: Battle of the Islands	September 30, 2017	1	1:57	San Mateo, California, United States	
Win	2–0	Deven Fisher	TKO (punches)	LFA Fight Night 1	May 5, 2017	1	1:40	Sioux Falls, South Dakota, United States	Catchweight (190 lb) bout.
Win	1–0	Mike Morales	TKO (punches)	Conquer Fighting Championship 3	March 18, 2017	1	0:28	Richmond, California, United States	Light Heavyweight debut.

== Freestyle record ==
Freestyle matches
Res.	Record	Opponent	Score	Date	Event	Location
Loss	64-36	(United States) Kollin Moore	0-7	August 30, 2020	Chael Sonnen's Wrestling Underground I	United States
2018 US World Team Trials Qualifier (silver) at 92kg
Loss	64-35	(United States) Hayden Zillmer	7-9	May 29, 2018	2018 US WTT Qualifiers	(United States) Rochester, Minnesota
Loss	64-34	(United States) Hayden Zillmer	2-8	May 29, 2018	2018 US WTT Qualifiers	(United States) Rochester, Minnesota
Win	64-33	(United States) Timmy McCall	4-2	May 29, 2018	2018 US WTT Qualifiers	(United States) Rochester, Minnesota
2018 US Open 4th at 92kg
Loss	63-33	(United States) Enock Francois	Fall	April 28, 2018	2018 US Open Wrestling Championships	(United States) Las Vegas, Nevada
Win	63-32	(United States) Nikko Reyes	Forfeit	April 28, 2018	2018 US Open Wrestling Championships	(United States) Las Vegas, Nevada
Loss	62-32	(United States) J'den Cox	0-3	April 28, 2018	2018 US Open Wrestling Championships	(United States) Las Vegas, Nevada
Win	62-31	(United States) Matt Williams	TF 11-0	April 28, 2018	2018 US Open Wrestling Championships	(United States) Las Vegas, Nevada
Win	61-31	(United States) Leonel Perez	TF 10-0	April 28, 2018	2018 US Open Wrestling Championships	(United States) Las Vegas, Nevada
Win	60-31	(United States) Cody Walters	3-1	April 28, 2018	2018 US Open Wrestling Championships	(United States) Las Vegas, Nevada
2018 Bill Farrell Memorial (silver) at 97kg
Loss	59-31	(United States) Ty Walz	2-4	March 20, 2018	2018 Bill Farrell Memorial International	(United States) New York City, New York
Win	59-30	(Ukraine) Serhii Mokhort	Fall	March 20, 2018	2018 Bill Farrell Memorial International	(United States) New York City, New York
Win	58-30	(United States) Blaize Cabell	2-1	March 20, 2018	2018 Bill Farrell Memorial International	(United States) New York City, New York
2016 Bill Farrell Memorial 4th at 86kg
Loss	57-30	(United States) Richard Perry	2-5	November 12, 2016	2016 Bill Farrell Memorial International	(United States) New York City, New York
Win	57-29	(United States) Joshua Asper	7-5	November 12, 2016	2016 Bill Farrell Memorial International	(United States) New York City, New York
Loss	56-29	(United States) Austin Trotman	TF 0-10	November 12, 2016	2016 Bill Farrell Memorial International	(United States) New York City, New York
Win	56-28	(United States) Peter Renda	11-5	November 12, 2016	2016 Bill Farrell Memorial International	(United States) New York City, New York
Win	55-28	(Tajikistan) Kodirov Bakhodur	Fall	November 12, 2016	2016 Bill Farrell Memorial International	(United States) New York City, New York
2016 US Olympic Team Trials at 86kg
Loss	54-28	(United States) Richard Perry	4-8	January 30, 2015	2016 US Olympic Team Trials	(United States) Iowa City, Iowa
Win	54-27	(United States) Austin Trotman	12-6	January 30, 2015	2016 US Olympic Team Trials	(United States) Iowa City, Iowa
Loss	53-27	(United States) Ed Ruth	TF 0-10	January 30, 2015	2016 US Olympic Team Trials	(United States) Iowa City, Iowa
2016 US Olympic Team Trials Challenge: Last Chance (gold) at 86kg
Win	53-26	(United States) Timmy McCall	10-6	April 3, 2016	2016 US Senior Last Chance OTT Qualif	(United States) Cedar Falls, Iowa
Win	52-26	(United States) Robert Hamlin	5-1	April 3, 2016	2016 US Senior Last Chance OTT Qualif	(United States) Cedar Falls, Iowa
Win	51-26	(United States) Josh Asper	7-3	April 3, 2016	2016 US Senior Last Chance OTT Qualif	(United States) Cedar Falls, Iowa
Win	50-26	(United States) Frank Richmond	TF 10-0	April 3, 2016	2016 US Senior Last Chance OTT Qualif	(United States) Cedar Falls, Iowa
Win	49-26	(United States) Nick Heflin	4-2	April 3, 2016	2016 US Senior Last Chance OTT Qualif	(United States) Cedar Falls, Iowa
2016 International Ukrainian Tournament (bronze) at 86kg
Win	48-26	(Ukraine) Dmytro Rochniak	10-4	February 11, 2016	2016 XXth Outstanding Ukrainian Wrestlers and Coaches Memorial	Kyiv, Ukraine
Win	47-26	(Hungary) Bendegúz Tóth	8-5	February 11, 2016	2016 XXth Outstanding Ukrainian Wrestlers and Coaches Memorial	Kyiv, Ukraine
Loss	46-26	(Ukraine) Ibragim Aldatov	3-9	February 11, 2016	2016 XXth Outstanding Ukrainian Wrestlers and Coaches Memorial	Kyiv, Ukraine
Win	46-25	(Armenia) Vahe Tamrazyan	8-3	February 11, 2016	2016 XXth Outstanding Ukrainian Wrestlers and Coaches Memorial	Kyiv, Ukraine
2016 Grand Prix Yaşar Doğu at 86kg
Loss	45-25	(Monaco) Luvsandors Turtogh	3-3	February 6, 2016	2016 Grand Prix Yaşar Doğu	Istanbul, Turkey
Win	45-24	(Turkey) Caner Demirtas	4-2	February 6, 2016	2016 Grand Prix Yaşar Doğu	Istanbul, Turkey
2016 Dave Schultz Memorial International (silver) at 86kg
Loss	44-24	(United States) Austin Trotman	8-9	January 30, 2015	2016 Dave Schultz Memorial International	(United States) Colorado Springs, Colorado
Win	44-23	(United States) Robert Hamlin	7-1	January 30, 2015	2016 Dave Schultz Memorial International	(United States) Colorado Springs, Colorado
Win	43-23	(United States) Zahid Valencia	TF 10-0	January 30, 2015	2016 Dave Schultz Memorial International	(United States) Colorado Springs, Colorado
2015 US Nationals at 97kg
Loss	42-23	(United States) Jeffery Felix	3-11	December 18, 2015	2015 US Senior Nationals	(United States) Las Vegas, Nevada
Win	42-22	(United States) Kallen Kleinschmidt	6-0	December 18, 2015	2015 US Senior Nationals	(United States) Las Vegas, Nevada
Loss	41-22	(United States) Micah Burak	2-5	December 18, 2015	2015 US Senior Nationals	(United States) Las Vegas, Nevada
2015 US World Team Trials Challenge at 86kg
Loss	41-21	(United States) Chris Perry	3-12	June 14, 2015	2015 US World Team Trials Challenge Tournament	(United States) Madison, Wisconsin
Win	41-20	(United States) Phil Keddy	Fall	June 14, 2015	2015 US World Team Trials Challenge Tournament	(United States) Madison, Wisconsin
Loss	40-20	(United States) Jon Reader	3-7	June 14, 2015	2015 US World Team Trials Challenge Tournament	(United States) Madison, Wisconsin
2015 US ASICS Nationals 4th at 86kg
Loss	40-19	(United States) Ed Ruth	TF 2-12	May 9, 2015	2015 Las Vegas/ASICS US Senior Nationals	(United States) Las Vegas, Nevada
Win	40-18	(United States) Ryan Loder	TF 10-0	May 9, 2015	2015 Las Vegas/ASICS US Senior Nationals	(United States) Las Vegas, Nevada
Loss	39-18	(United States) Keith Gavin	4-8	May 9, 2015	2015 Las Vegas/ASICS US Senior Nationals	(United States) Las Vegas, Nevada
Win	39-17	(United States) Chris Perry	7-3	May 9, 2015	2015 Las Vegas/ASICS US Senior Nationals	(United States) Las Vegas, Nevada
Win	38-17	(United States) Pat Downey	7-1	May 9, 2015	2015 Las Vegas/ASICS US Senior Nationals	(United States) Las Vegas, Nevada
Win	37-17	(United States) Zac Slotten	TF 10-0	May 9, 2015	2015 Las Vegas/ASICS US Senior Nationals	(United States) Las Vegas, Nevada
2015 Alexander Medved Prizes 15th at 86kg
Loss	36-17	(United States) Richard Perry	3-11	March 5, 2015	2015 Alexander Medved Prizes	Minsk, Belarus
Win	36-16	(Turkmenistan) Yusup Melejayev	1-1	March 5, 2015	2015 Alexander Medved Prizes	Minsk, Belarus
2014 Bill Farrell Memorial (silver) at 86kg
Loss	35-16	(United States) Richard Perry	4-5	November 7, 2014	2014 Bill Farrell Memorial International	(United States) New York City, New York
Win	35-15	(United States) Jon Reader	8-4	November 7, 2014	2014 Bill Farrell Memorial International	(United States) New York City, New York
Win	34-15	(United States) Benjamin Bennett	6-0	November 7, 2014	2014 Bill Farrell Memorial International	(United States) New York City, New York
Win	33-15	(United States) Nathanael Rose	TF 12-0	November 7, 2014	2014 Bill Farrell Memorial International	(United States) New York City, New York
Win	32-15	(Canada) Alex Brown-Theriault	9-0	November 7, 2014	2014 Bill Farrell Memorial International	(United States) New York City, New York
2014 Pan American Championship (bronze) at 97kg
Win	31-15	(Canada) Ali Al-Rekabi	8-5	July 16, 2014	2014 Pan American Wrestling Championships	Mexico City, México
Loss	30-15	(Cuba) Javier Cortina	TF 0-11	July 16, 2014	2014 Pan American Wrestling Championships	Mexico City, México
2014 US World Team Trials Challenge (silver) at 97kg
Loss	30-14	(United States) Dustin Kilgore	1-5	June 1, 2014	2014 US World Team Trials Challenge Tournament	(United States) Madison, Wisconsin
Win	30-13	(United States) J'den Cox	10-2	June 1, 2014	2014 US World Team Trials Challenge Tournament	(United States) Madison, Wisconsin
Win	29-13	(United States) Micah Burak	6-0	June 1, 2014	2014 US World Team Trials Challenge Tournament	(United States) Madison, Wisconsin
2014 US Open 4th at 97kg
Loss	28-13	(United States) J. D. Bergman	TF 0-10	April 19, 2014	2014 US Open Wrestling Championships	(United States) Las Vegas, Nevada
Win	28-12	(United States) David Zabriskie	4-1	April 19, 2014	2014 US Open Wrestling Championships	(United States) Las Vegas, Nevada
Loss	27-12	(United States) Jacob Varner	TF 0-11	April 19, 2014	2014 US Open Wrestling Championships	(United States) Las Vegas, Nevada
Win	27-11	(United States) Chris Pendleton	9-5	April 19, 2014	2014 US Open Wrestling Championships	(United States) Las Vegas, Nevada
Win	26-11	(United States) Cayle Byers	Fall	April 19, 2014	2014 US Open Wrestling Championships	(United States) Las Vegas, Nevada
Win	25-11	(United States) Brad Rabenstein	TF 10-0	April 19, 2014	2014 US Open Wrestling Championships	(United States) Las Vegas, Nevada
2014 Alexander Medved Prizes 8th at 97kg
Loss	24-11	(Ukraine) Valeriy Andriytsev	3-8	March 1, 2014	2014 Alexander Medved Prizes	Minsk, Belarus
Win	24-10	(Kazakhstan) Beglan Kanatkhanov	2-1	March 1, 2014	2014 Alexander Medved Prizes	Minsk, Belarus
2014 Dave Schultz Memorial (bronze) at 97kg
Win	23-10	(United States) Micah Burak	3-2	February 2, 2014	2014 Dave Schultz Memorial International	(United States) Colorado Springs, Colorado
Win	22-10	(United States) Cameron Simaz	TF 10-0	February 2, 2014	2014 Dave Schultz Memorial International	(United States) Colorado Springs, Colorado
Loss	21-10	(United States) Dustin Kilgore	TF 1-12	February 2, 2014	2014 Dave Schultz Memorial International	(United States) Colorado Springs, Colorado
Win	21-9	(Kyrgyzstan) Aibek Usupov	TF 10-0	February 2, 2014	2014 Dave Schultz Memorial International	(United States) Colorado Springs, Colorado
2013 Minnesota Storm Holiday Cup (gold) at 96kg
Win	20-9	(United States) John Wechter	TF 10-0	December 21, 2013	2013 Minnesota Storm Holiday Cup	(United States) Rochester, Minnesota
Win	19-9	(United States) Evan Brown	11-4	December 21, 2013	2013 Minnesota Storm Holiday Cup	(United States) Rochester, Minnesota
Win	18-9	(United States) Ryan Flores	8-2	December 21, 2013	2013 Minnesota Storm Holiday Cup	(United States) Rochester, Minnesota
2013 NYAC Holiday International (silver) at 96kg
Loss	17-9	(United States) Wynn Michalak	6-9	November 9, 2013	2013 NYAC Holiday International	(United States) New York City, New York
Win	17-8	(United States) Jack Jensen	6-2	November 9, 2013	2013 NYAC Holiday International	(United States) New York City, New York
Win	16-8	(United States) Micah Burak	7-0	November 9, 2013	2013 NYAC Holiday International	(United States) New York City, New York
Win	15-8	(United States) Cayle Byers	4-0	November 9, 2013	2013 NYAC Holiday International	(United States) New York City, New York
2013 Northern Plains Regional at 96kg
Loss	14-8	(United States) Jack Jensen	Forfeit	May 10, 2013	2013 Northern Plains Freestyle Senior Regional Championships	(United States) Waterloo, Iowa
Loss	14-7	(United States) Scott Schiller	4-1, 1–6, 3-9	May 10, 2013	2013 Northern Plains Freestyle Senior Regional Championships	(United States) Waterloo, Iowa
Win	14-6	(United States) Donnie Horner	1-1, 6-0	May 10, 2013	2013 Northern Plains Freestyle Senior Regional Championships	(United States) Waterloo, Iowa
Win	13-6	(United States) Josh Eckmann	TF 0-0, 7–0, 7-0	May 10, 2013	2013 Northern Plains Freestyle Senior Regional Championships	(United States) Waterloo, Iowa
2013 US Open at 96kg
Loss	12-6	(United States) Cayle Byers	7-0, 0–2, 0-2	April 18, 2013	2013 US Open Wrestling Championships	(United States) Las Vegas, Nevada
Loss	12-5	(United States) Les Sigman	3-3, 0-7	April 18, 2013	2013 US Open Wrestling Championships	(United States) Las Vegas, Nevada
2013 Cerro Pelado (bronze) at 96kg
Win	12-4	(Canada) Jeremy LaTour	TF 5–0, 10-1	February 10, 2013	2013 Cerro Pelado International	Habana, Cuba
Loss	11-4	(Cuba) Abraham Conyedo	1–3, 2-3	February 10, 2013	2013 Cerro Pelado International	Habana, Cuba
Win	11-3	(Cuba) Raisel Almora	TF 5–0, 5-0	February 10, 2013	2013 Cerro Pelado International	Habana, Cuba
2012 NYAC Holiday International 4th at 96kg
Loss	10-3	(United States) Jack Jensen	2-0, 0–3, 0-3	November 10, 2012	2012 NYAC Holiday International	(United States) New York City, New York
Win	10-2	(Canada) Jeremy LaTour	TF 6–0, 8-0	November 10, 2012	2012 NYAC Holiday International	(United States) New York City, New York
Win	9-2	(United States) Evan Brown	4-0, 4-0	November 10, 2012	2012 NYAC Holiday International	(United States) New York City, New York
Win	8-2	(United States) Tanner Hall	1-0, 1-0	November 10, 2012	2012 NYAC Holiday International	(United States) New York City, New York
Loss	7-2	(United States) Cayle Byers	0-1, 1-3	November 10, 2012	2012 NYAC Holiday International	(United States) New York City, New York
Win	7-1	(Kyrgyzstan) Aibek Usupov	2-0, 4-0	November 10, 2012	2012 NYAC Holiday International	(United States) New York City, New York
2012 US University Nationals (bronze) at 96kg
Win	6-1	(United States) Scott Schiller	7-5, 2-2	July 3, 2012	2012 ASICS University Freestyle National Championships	(United States) Akron, Ohio
Win	5-1	(United States) Micah Burak	1-0, 0–1, 1-0	July 3, 2012	2012 ASICS University Freestyle National Championships	(United States) Akron, Ohio
Loss	4-1	(United States) Matt Wilps	3-0, 0–1, 0-3	July 3, 2012	2012 ASICS University Freestyle National Championships	(United States) Akron, Ohio
Win	4-0	(United States) Max Huntley	1-0, 1-0	July 3, 2012	2012 ASICS University Freestyle National Championships	(United States) Akron, Ohio
Win	3-0	(United States) Nikolas Brown	Fall	July 3, 2012	2012 ASICS University Freestyle National Championships	(United States) Akron, Ohio
Win	2-0	(United States) Paul Rands	7-0, 6-3	July 3, 2012	2012 ASICS University Freestyle National Championships	(United States) Akron, Ohio
Win	1–0	(United States) Phil Wellington	4-0, 7-0	July 3, 2012	2012 ASICS University Freestyle National Championships	(United States) Akron, Ohio

== See also ==
- List of male mixed martial artists
