= Eric Spicely =

American professional wrestler and mixed martial arts fighter

- Born: Eric Benjamin Spicely; September 29, 1986 (age 40); Stoughton, Massachusetts, United States
- Other names: Zebrinha
- Height: 6 ft 1 in (1.85 m)
- Weight: 185 lb (84 kg; 13.2 st)
- Division: Middleweight; Light Heavyweight; Welterweight
- Reach: 73 in (185 cm)
- Fighting out of: Olneyville, Rhode Island, United States
- Team: Tristar Gym (2017–present)
- Rank: Black belt in Brazilian Jiu-Jitsu under Tim Burrill
- Years active: 2012–present

Mixed martial arts record
- Total: 22
- Wins: 13
- By knockout: 4
- By submission: 7
- By decision: 2
- Losses: 9
- By knockout: 5
- By submission: 3
- By decision: 1

Other information
- Mixed martial arts record from Sherdog

Eric Benjamin Spicely (born September 29, 1986) is an American mixed martial artist and professional wrestler competing in the middleweight division. A professional competitor since 2012, he formerly competed for the Ultimate Fighting Championship, RFA, CES MMA and was a Light Heavyweight contestant on The Ultimate Fighter: Team Joanna vs. Team Cláudia.

== Background ==
Spicely was raised primarily by his grandmother in New York state. Prior to his career in MMA, Spicely was a professional wrestler, and was also a talented skateboarder. Trained as a professional wrestler by Biff Busick, he competed for Beyond Wrestling often teaming with Chuck O'Neil and Matt Riddle.

== Mixed martial arts career ==
=== Early career ===
Spicely compiled an amateur record of 2–1 before turning professional in 2013, competing exclusively for CES MMA in his native Rhode Island.

He compiled an undefeated record of 8–0 before being added as one of the 16 Light Heavyweight fighters invited to the cast The Ultimate Fighter 23.

He won his entry fight against Kenneth Bergh via first round submission. Next up, he defeated Elias Urbina via unanimous decision. In the semifinals, he was eliminated from the competition by eventual season winner Andrew Sanchez by knockout in the first round.

=== Ultimate Fighting Championship ===
Spicely made his promotional debut against Sam Alvey on July 13, 2016, at UFC Fight Night 91. He lost the fight via submission in first round.

Spicely next faced Thiago Santos on September 24, 2016, at UFC Fight Night 95. In a large upset, he won the fight by submission in the first round. This fight earned him the Performance of the Night award.

Spicely faced Alessio Di Chirico on January 28, 2017, at UFC on Fox 23. He won the fight via submission in the first round.

Spicely faced Antônio Carlos Júnior on June 3, 2017, at UFC 212. He lost the fight by submission due to a rear-naked choke in the second round.

Spicely fought Gerald Meerschaert on December 1, 2017, at The Ultimate Fighter 26 Finale. He lost the bout via TKO in the second round.

Spicely faced Darren Stewart on May 27, 2018, at UFC Fight Night 130. He lost the fight via technical knock out in the second round.

On August 14, 2018, it was announced that Spicely was released from UFC.

=== Post-UFC career ===
Spicely was expected to face Stephen Regman at CES 54 on January 19, 2019. Regman withdrew from the bout and was replaced by Leo Pla. Spicely won the bout via TKO in the first round.

=== Return to UFC ===
On the heels of two first round finishes on the regional circuit, Spicely was re-signed by the promotion for four fights and tabbed as a short notice replacement against promotional newcomer Deron Winn on June 22, 2019, at UFC Fight Night 154. He lost the fight by unanimous decision. This fight earned him the Fight of the Night award.

Spicely was scheduled to face Brendan Allen on October 18, 2019, at UFC on ESPN 6. However, Spicely was forced to withdraw from the event for undisclosed reason.

Spicely was scheduled to face Punahele Soriano on March 28, 2020, at UFC on ESPN: Ngannou vs. Rozenstruik. However, Soriano was removed from the card for undisclosed reasons and replaced by Roman Kopylov. Due to the COVID-19 pandemic, the event was eventually postponed .

Spicely was scheduled to face Markus Perez on August 1, 2020, at UFC Fight Night: Brunson vs. Shahbazyan. However, Spicely was removed from the fight (and subsequently released from the promotion) on the day of the event's weigh-in for health issues related to his weight cut.

==== Taura MMA ====
In late August 2020, Spicely signed with Taura MMA and scheduled to make his debut on November 22, 2020. However, due to hardships with COVID-19 restrictions the event was postponed.

==== Other regional circuit ====
Spicely next faced Rinat Fakhretdinov at UAE Warriors 15 on January 15, 2021. He lost the fight via first-minute knockout.

Spicely faced Marcin Naruszczka at OKTAGON 24 on May 29, 2021. He lost the fight via technical knockout in the second round.

Spicely faced Zdenek Polivka at OKTAGON 28 on September 25, 2021. He lost the fight via technical knockout in the first round.

== Awards and recognition ==
=== Mixed martial arts ===
- Ultimate Fighting Championship
  - Fight of the Night (One time) vs. Deron Winn
  - Performance of the Night (One time) vs Thiago Santos
  - UFC.com Awards
    - 2016: Ranked #9 Submission of the Year & Ranked #2 Upset of the Year vs. Thiago Santos

== Mixed martial arts record ==
Professional record breakdown
| 22 matches | 13 wins | 9 losses |
| By knockout | 4 | 5 |
| By submission | 7 | 3 |
| By decision | 2 | 1 |

| Res. | Record | Opponent | Method | Event | Date | Round | Time | Location | Notes |
|---|---|---|---|---|---|---|---|---|---|
| Loss | 13–9 | Justin Sumter | Submission (neck crank) | CES 75 | October 20, 2023 | 1 | 2:32 | Ledyard, Connecticut, United States | Return to Light Heavyweight. Spicely missed weight (207 lbs). |
| Win | 13–8 | Nikola Zlatev | Submission (twister) | FABRIQ MMA 2 | February 25, 2023 | 1 | 0:54 | Nitra, Slovakia | |
| Loss | 12–8 | Zdenek Polivka | TKO (punches) | OKTAGON 28 | September 25, 2021 | 1 | 1:22 | Prague, Czech Republic | |
| Loss | 12–7 | Marcin Naruszczka | TKO (punches) | OKTAGON 24 | May 29, 2021 | 2 | 2:25 | Brno, Czech Republic | Catchweight (194 lb) bout. |
| Loss | 12–6 | Rinat Fakhretdinov | KO (punch) | UAE Warriors 15 & EFC 32 | January 15, 2021 | 1 | 0:55 | Abu Dhabi, United Arab Emirates | |
| Loss | 12–5 | Deron Winn | Decision (unanimous) | UFC Fight Night: Moicano vs. Korean Zombie | June 22, 2019 | 3 | 5:00 | Greenville, South Carolina, United States | Fight of the Night. |
| Win | 12–4 | Caio Magalhães | TKO (punches) | CES 55 | March 29, 2019 | 1 | 4:00 | Hartford, Connecticut, United States | |
| Win | 11–4 | Leo Pla | TKO (punches) | CES 54 | January 19, 2019 | 1 | 3:53 | Lincoln, Rhode Island, United States | |
| Loss | 10–4 | Darren Stewart | TKO (punches) | UFC Fight Night: Thompson vs. Till | May 27, 2018 | 2 | 1:47 | Liverpool, England | |
| Loss | 10–3 | Gerald Meerschaert | TKO (body kick) | The Ultimate Fighter: A New World Champion Finale | December 1, 2017 | 2 | 2:18 | Las Vegas, Nevada, United States | |
| Loss | 10–2 | Antônio Carlos Júnior | Submission (rear-naked choke) | UFC 212 | June 3, 2017 | 2 | 3:49 | Rio de Janeiro, Brazil | |
| Win | 10–1 | Alessio Di Chirico | Submission (triangle choke) | UFC on Fox: Shevchenko vs. Peña | January 28, 2017 | 1 | 2:14 | Denver, Colorado, United States | |
| Win | 9–1 | Thiago Santos | Submission (rear-naked choke) | UFC Fight Night: Cyborg vs. Lansberg | September 24, 2016 | 1 | 2:58 | Brasília, Brazil | Performance of the Night. |
| Loss | 8–1 | Sam Alvey | Submission (guillotine choke) | UFC Fight Night: McDonald vs. Lineker | July 13, 2016 | 1 | 2:43 | Sioux Falls, South Dakota, United States | |
| Win | 8–0 | Aaron Johnson | Decision (unanimous) | CES MMA 31 | October 30, 2015 | 3 | 5:00 | Lincoln, Rhode Island, United States | |
| Win | 7–0 | Harley Beekman | Submission (armbar) | CES MMA 29 | June 12, 2015 | 1 | 4;40 | Lincoln, Rhode Island, United States | Return to Middleweight. |
| Win | 6–0 | Kevin Haley | Submission (heel hook) | CES MMA 27 | January 30, 2015 | 1 | 2:26 | Lincoln, Rhode Island, United States | Light Heavyweight debut. |
| Win | 5–0 | Nuri Shakur | TKO (punches and elbows) | CES MMA 25 | August 8, 2014 | 1 | 1:34 | Lincoln, Rhode Island, United States | Middleweight debut. |
| Win | 4–0 | David Jordan | Submission (guillotine choke) | CES MMA 23 | April 25, 2014 | 1 | 2:38 | Lincoln, Rhode Island, United States | Catchweight (180 lb) bout. |
| Win | 3–0 | Tyler Rose | TKO (injury) | CES MMA 20 | December 6, 2013 | 1 | 5;00 | Lincoln, Rhode Island, United States | |
| Win | 2–0 | Tunde Odumuso | Submission (rear-naked choke) | CES MMA New Blood | June 7, 2013 | 1 | 1:41 | Lincoln, Rhode Island, United States | Catchweight (175 lb) bout. |
| Win | 1–0 | Kemran Lachinov | Decision (unanimous) | CES MMA Undisputed | February 1, 2013 | 3 | 5;00 | Lincoln, Rhode Island, United States | |

=== Mixed martial arts exhibition record ===
| Exhibition record breakdown | | |
| 3 matches | 2 wins | 1 loss |
| By knockout | 0 | 1 |
| By submission | 1 | 0 |
| By decision | 1 | 0 |

| Res. | Record | Opponent | Method | Event | Date | Round | Time | Location | Notes |
|---|---|---|---|---|---|---|---|---|---|
| Loss | 2–1 | Andrew Sanchez | KO (punches) | The Ultimate Fighter: Team Joanna vs. Team Cláudia | March 1, 2016 | 1 | 0:47 | Las Vegas, Nevada, United States | TUF 23 Semifinal round. |
| Win | 2–0 | Elias Urbina | Decision (unanimous) | The Ultimate Fighter: Team Joanna vs. Team Cláudia | February 16, 2016 | 2 | 5:00 | Las Vegas, Nevada, United States | TUF 23 Quarterfinal round. |
| Win | 1–0 | Kenneth Bergh | Submission (rear-naked choke) | The Ultimate Fighter: Team Joanna vs. Team Cláudia | January 26, 2016 | 1 | 2:10 | Las Vegas, Nevada, United States | TUF 23 Elimination round. |
