= UFC on Fox: Lawler vs. dos Anjos =

UFC mixed martial arts event in 2017

- The poster for UFC on Fox: Lawler vs. dos Anjos
- Promotion: Ultimate Fighting Championship
- Date: December 16, 2017
- Venue: Bell MTS Place
- City: Winnipeg, Manitoba, Canada
- Attendance: 8,862
- Total gate: $781,359

Event chronology
UFC Fight Night: Swanson vs. Ortega	UFC on Fox: Lawler vs. dos Anjos	UFC 219: Cyborg vs. Holm

UFC on Fox: Lawler vs. dos Anjos (also known as UFC on Fox 26) was a mixed martial arts event produced by the Ultimate Fighting Championship held on December 16, 2017, at the Bell MTS Place in Winnipeg, Manitoba, Canada.

== Background ==
The event was the second that the promotion has hosted in Winnipeg, following UFC 161 in June 2013.

The event was headlined by a welterweight bout between former UFC Welterweight Champion Robbie Lawler and former UFC Lightweight Champion Rafael dos Anjos. On October 13, UFC President Dana White announced that the winner of the main event would receive a title shot against current champion Tyron Woodley, who won the belt by defeating Lawler by first-round knockout at UFC 201.

A light heavyweight bout between Antônio Rogério Nogueira and Jared Cannonier, briefly linked to UFC Fight Night: Poirier vs. Pettis, was instead scheduled for this event. However, on October 19, it was announced that Nogueira was pulled from the card after being notified by USADA of a potential doping violation, which resulted from an out-of-competition sample collected on September 27. The violation was due to a positive test for hydrochlorothiazide. He was replaced by Jan Błachowicz.

A light heavyweight bout between former UFC Light Heavyweight Championship challenger Glover Teixeira and Misha Cirkunov was expected to take place at UFC Fight Night: Brunson vs. Machida, but was moved to this event after a recent hand injury for Teixeira was slow to heal and required surgery.

Former WEC Featherweight Champion and two-time UFC Featherweight Champion José Aldo was scheduled to face former title challenger Ricardo Lamas in a rematch in the co-headliner. The pairing met previously at UFC 169 in February 2014, with Aldo defending his title via unanimous decision. However, Aldo was removed from the bout on November 10 in favor of a rematch against the current champion Max Holloway two weeks earlier at UFC 218 after Holloway's scheduled opponent, former UFC Lightweight Champion Frankie Edgar pulled out of that fight. He was replaced by Josh Emmett.

A middleweight bout between Vitor Miranda and promotional newcomer Julian Marquez was expected to take place at this event. However, on December 4, it was announced that Miranda was pulled from the fight, citing injury and was replaced by Darren Stewart.

Sultan Aliev and Sheldon Westcott were removed out of their respective fights against Nordine Taleb and Danny Roberts for undisclosed reasons. Taleb and Roberts were then scheduled to face each other.

A flyweight bout between former title challenger and The Ultimate Fighter: Tournament of Champions flyweight winner Tim Elliott and Justin Scoggins was expected to take place at this event. However, on December 3, it was announced that Scoggins was pulled from the fight due to a spinal fracture injury and was replaced by promotional newcomer Pietro Menga. In turn, Menga also withdrew from the bout during fight week following weight-cutting complications and the bout was scrapped entirely.

At the weigh ins, Emmett weighed in at 148.5 pounds, 2.5 pounds over the featherweight non-title fight upper limit of 146 pounds. As such, the bout proceeded at a catchweight and Emmett is expected to forfeit part of his purse to his opponent Lamas. Meanwhile, Menga did not weigh in and his fight against Elliott was canceled.

== Results ==
Main Card (Fox)
Weight class				Method	Round	Time	Notes
Welterweight	Rafael dos Anjos	def.	Robbie Lawler	Decision (unanimous) (50–45, 50–45, 50–45)	5	5:00	(Note: UFC Welterweight title eliminator.)
Catchweight (148.5 lb)	Josh Emmett	def.	Ricardo Lamas	KO (punch)	1	4:33
Welterweight	Santiago Ponzinibbio	def.	Mike Perry	Decision (unanimous) (29–28, 29–28, 29–28)	3	5:00
Light Heavyweight	Glover Teixeira	def.	Misha Cirkunov	TKO (punches)	1	2:45
Preliminary Card (Fox Sports 1)
Light Heavyweight	Jan Błachowicz	def.	Jared Cannonier	Decision (unanimous) (29–28, 29–28, 29–28)	3	5:00
Middleweight	Julian Marquez	def.	Darren Stewart	Submission (guillotine choke)	2	2:42
Welterweight	Chad Laprise	def.	Galore Bofando	TKO (punches)	1	4:10
Welterweight	Nordine Taleb	def.	Danny Roberts	KO (head kick, elbow and punch)	1	0:59
Lightweight	John Makdessi	def.	Abel Trujillo	Decision (unanimous) (30–27, 30–27, 30–27)	3	5:00
Middleweight	Alessio Di Chirico	def.	Oluwale Bamgbose	KO (knee)	2	2:14
Preliminary Card (UFC Fight Pass)
Welterweight	Jordan Mein	def.	Erick Silva	Decision (unanimous) (30–26, 30–27, 30–27)	3	5:00

== Bonus awards ==
The following fighters were awarded $50,000 bonuses:

- Fight of the Night: Julian Marquez vs. Darren Stewart
- Performance of the Night: Nordine Taleb and Alessio Di Chirico

== See also ==
- List of UFC events
- 2017 in UFC
