= Tony Kelley =

American mixed martial arts fighter

- Born: January 21, 1987 (age 39); Shreveport, Louisiana, United States
- Height: 5 ft 9 in (1.75 m)
- Weight: 135 lb (61 kg; 9 st 9 lb)
- Division: Bantamweight
- Reach: 70 in (178 cm)
- Fighting out of: Shreveport, Louisiana
- Team: Team Alpha Male
- Years active: 2012–present

Mixed martial arts record
- Total: 11
- Wins: 8
- By knockout: 3
- By submission: 3
- By decision: 2
- Losses: 3
- By knockout: 1
- By decision: 2

Other information
- Mixed martial arts record from Sherdog

Tony Kelley (born January 21, 1987) is an American mixed martial artist who competes in the Bantamweight division. A professional since 2012, he most notably competed in the Ultimate Fighting Championship.

== Background ==
As he entered his teen years, Kelley described his life as diverging into questionable decisions made to impress others while trying to be like others. After a while, friends and family members became concerned, and a friend encouraged the then-19-year-old Kelley to get involved in a local jiu-jitsu class to provide some structure.

== Mixed martial arts career ==
=== Early career ===
In 2012, Kelley was one of the young MMA fighters featured in Caged - an MTV reality television series. The show focused on four prospective MMA fighters in small-town Louisiana. Kelley was one of the two fighters on the show, alongside Matt Schnell, to later fight professionally.

After going professional in September 2012, Kelley would go on to have a 6–1 record on the regional scene, losing his only bout in a close split decision to fellow future UFC fighter Kevin Aguilar.

=== Ultimate Fighting Championship ===
Kelley made his UFC debut against Kai Kamaka III at UFC 252 on August 15, 2020. He lost the bout via unanimous decision. This bout earned him a Fight of the Night bonus award

Kelley faced Ali AlQaisi on October 11, 2020, at UFC Fight Night: Moraes vs. Sandhagen. He won the bout via unanimous decision.

Kelley was scheduled to face Trevin Jones on July 24, 2021, at UFC on ESPN: Sandhagen vs. Dillashaw. However, on July 4, Kelly withdrew from the bout for unknown reasons.

Kelley faced Randy Costa on December 11, 2021, at UFC 269. He won the fight via TKO in the second round.

Kelley faced Adrian Yañez on June 18, 2022 at UFC on ESPN 37. At the weigh-ins on June 17, Kelley weighed in at 137.5 pounds, one-and-a-half pounds over the non-title bantamweight limit. As a result, the bout proceeded as a catchweight and Kelley forfeited 20% of his purse to Yañez. He lost the bout in the first round via TKO stoppage.

On July 7, 2022, it was announced that Kelley was no longer on the roster.

== Championships and accomplishments ==
- Ultimate Fighting Championship
  - Fight of the Night (One time) vs. Kai Kamaka III

== Legal troubles ==
In March 2012, Kelley was charged with simple battery due to a nightclub scuffle in which he allegedly choked a woman for not wanting to dance with him. He was eventually found not guilty.

== Controversies ==
Kelley caused controversy at UFC on ESPN: Błachowicz vs. Rakić on May 14, 2022 while cornering Andrea Lee in her fight against Brazilian opponent Viviane Araújo. Referring to an alleged eye poke by Araújo, Kelley said: "That’s what they’re going to do, they’re dirty fucking Brazilians, they’re going to fucking cheat like that." In response to criticism of the comment, Kelley released a statement on Twitter denying any "racist connotations" and claiming to be a victim of "cancel culture".

== Mixed martial arts record ==
Professional record breakdown
11 matches	8 wins	3 losses
By knockout	3	1
By submission	3	0
By decision	2	2

Res.	Record	Opponent	Method	Event	Date	Round	Time	Location	Notes
Loss	8–3	Adrian Yañez	TKO (punches)	UFC on ESPN: Kattar vs. Emmett	June 18, 2022	1	3:49	Austin, Texas, United States	Catchweight (137.5 lb) bout; Kelley missed weight.
Win	8–2	Randy Costa	TKO (elbows)	UFC 269	December 11, 2021	2	4:15	Las Vegas, Nevada, United States	
Win	7–2	Ali AlQaisi	Decision (unanimous)	UFC Fight Night: Moraes vs. Sandhagen	October 11, 2020	3	5:00	Abu Dhabi, United Arab Emirates	Bantamweight debut.
Loss	6–2	Kai Kamaka III	Decision (unanimous)	UFC 252	August 15, 2020	3	5:00	Las Vegas, Nevada, United States	Fight of the Night.
Win	6–1	Andy Brossett	Submission (guillotine choke)	Rite of Passage 7	May 17, 2019	1	2:33	Bossier City, Louisiana, United States	
Loss	5–1	Kevin Aguilar	Decision (split)	Legacy FC 57	July 1, 2016	5	5:00	Bossier City, Louisiana, United States	For the vacant Legacy FC Featherweight Championship.
Win	5–0	Levi Mowles	Decision (split)	Legacy Kickboxing 2	May 29, 2015	3	5:00	Shreveport, Louisiana, United States	
Win	4–0	Jordan Winski	Submission (rear-naked choke)	World Fighting Federation 19	February 21, 2015	3	4:08	Tucson, Arizona, United States	
Win	3–0	Chris Pham	Technical Submission (shoulder choke)	Legacy FC 32	June 20, 2014	2	4:58	Shreveport, Louisiana, United States	
Win	2–0	Kody Thrasher	TKO (punches)	Hilia Fights 1	April 26, 2013	1	3:37	Kenner, Louisiana, United States	
Win	1–0	Sean Marsicane	TKO (punches)	Coalition of Combat	September 15, 2012	1	2:30	Phoenix, Arizona, United States	Featherweight debut.

== See also ==
- List of male mixed martial artists
