= UFC on ESPN: Kattar vs. Emmett =

Mixed martial arts event in 2022

- The poster for UFC on ESPN: Kattar vs. Emmett
- Promotion: Ultimate Fighting Championship
- Date: June 18, 2022
- Venue: Moody Center
- City: Austin, Texas, United States
- Attendance: 13,689
- Total gate: $1,930,000

Event chronology
UFC 275: Teixeira vs. Procházka	UFC on ESPN: Kattar vs. Emmett	UFC on ESPN: Tsarukyan vs. Gamrot

UFC on ESPN: Kattar vs. Emmett (also known as UFC on ESPN 37 and UFC Austin) was a mixed martial arts event produced by the Ultimate Fighting Championship that took place on June 18, 2022 at the Moody Center in Austin, Texas, United States.

== Background ==
After Frank Erwin Center hosted all previous UFC visits to the city, the newly built Moody Center was the venue for this event.

A featherweight bout between Calvin Kattar and Josh Emmett headlined the event.

A middleweight bout between Phil Hawes and Deron Winn took place at the event. They were previously scheduled to meet at UFC on ESPN: Makhachev vs. Moisés and UFC Fight Night: Dern vs. Rodriguez, but Winn pulled out both times due to injuries.

Roman Dolidze and Kyle Daukaus were expected to meet in a middleweight bout at UFC Fight Night: Holloway vs. Rodríguez, but it was cancelled due to COVID-19 protocols related to Dolidze’s camp. They were rebooked for this event.

A middleweight bout between Julian Marquez and Wellington Turman was expected to take place at the event. However, Turman withdrew due to an orbital bone injury and was replaced by Gregory Rodrigues.

A lightweight bout between Joe Lauzon and former UFC Lightweight Championship challenger Donald Cerrone was rescheduled to this event. They were originally scheduled for UFC on ESPN: Font vs. Vera, but were moved to UFC 274 for unknown reasons. In turn, the bout was scrapped on the day of that event when Cerrone suffered from food poisoning. The bout was yet again scrapped the day of this event due to Lauzon suffering from leg cramping.

At the weigh-ins, Tony Kelley weighed in at 137.5 pounds, one and a half pounds over the bantamweight non-title fight limit. His bout proceeded at a catchweight and he was fined 20% of his individual purse, which went to his opponent Adrian Yañez.

== Results ==
Main card (ESPN / ESPN+)
Weight class				Method	Round	Time	Notes
Featherweight	Josh Emmett	def.	Calvin Kattar	Decision (split) (47–48, 48–47, 48–47)	5	5:00
Welterweight	Kevin Holland	def.	Tim Means	Submission (D'Arce choke)	2	1:28
Middleweight	Joaquin Buckley	def.	Albert Duraev	TKO (doctor stoppage)	2	5:00	(Note: Originally announced as ending at 0:10 of Round 3.)
Lightweight	Damir Ismagulov	def.	Guram Kutateladze	Decision (split) (28–29, 29–28, 30–27)	3	5:00	(Note: Originally announced as a majority decision (28–28, 29–28, 30–27) due to a miscalculation in scores.)
Middleweight	Gregory Rodrigues	def.	Julian Marquez	KO (punches)	1	3:18
Catchweight (137.5 lb)	Adrian Yañez	def.	Tony Kelley	TKO (punches)	1	3:49
Preliminary card (ESPN2 / ESPN+)
Women's Flyweight	Natália Silva	def.	Jasmine Jasudavicius	Decision (unanimous) (30–26, 30–26, 30–27)	3	5:00
Welterweight	Jeremiah Wells	def.	Court McGee	KO (punch)	1	1:34
Featherweight	Ricardo Ramos	def.	Danny Chavez	KO (spinning back elbow)	1	1:12
Women's Strawweight	Maria Oliveira	def.	Gloria de Paula	Decision (split) (29–28, 28–29, 29–28)	3	5:00
Bantamweight	Cody Stamann	def.	Eddie Wineland	TKO (punches)	1	0:59
Middleweight	Phil Hawes	def.	Deron Winn	TKO (elbows)	2	4:25
Middleweight	Roman Dolidze	def.	Kyle Daukaus	KO (knee and punches)	1	1:13

== Bonus awards ==
The following fighters received $50,000 bonuses.

- Fight of the Night: Josh Emmett vs. Calvin Kattar
- Performance of the Night: Kevin Holland, Joaquin Buckley, Gregory Rodrigues, Adrian Yañez, Jeremiah Wells, Ricardo Ramos, Cody Stamann, Phil Hawes, and Roman Dolidze

== See also ==
- List of UFC events
- List of current UFC fighters
- 2022 in UFC
