= Phil Hawes =

American mixed martial arts fighter

- Born: Philip Nicholas Fitzgerald Hawes; January 8, 1989 (age 37); Hackensack, New Jersey, U.S.
- Other names: No Hype
- Height: 5 ft 11 in (1.80 m)
- Weight: 185 lb (84 kg; 13 st 3 lb)
- Division: Middleweight
- Reach: 77 in (196 cm)
- Style: Wrestling
- Fighting out of: Little Ferry, New Jersey U.S.
- Team: Jackson-Wink MMA (2014–2017); BlackZilians (2015); Tiger Schulmann (2019–2020); Sanford MMA
- Rank: Brown belt in Brazilian jiu-jitsu
- Wrestling: NJCAA National Champion, Division I
- Years active: 2014–present

Kickboxing record
- Total: 1
- Wins: 1
- Losses: 0
- Draws: 0

Mixed martial arts record
- Total: 18
- Wins: 12
- By knockout: 8
- By submission: 2
- By decision: 2
- Losses: 6
- By knockout: 5
- By submission: 1

Other information
- Mixed martial arts record from Sherdog

Philip Nicholas Fitzgerald Hawes (born January 8, 1989) is an American mixed martial artist who last competed in the Middleweight division of the Ultimate Fighting Championship.

== Background ==
Hawes started out as a standout wrestler, winning a national 197 lb junior-college wrestling title at Iowa Central Community College, then moving onto Division I Iowa State, where he graduated with a degree in sociology.

== Mixed martial arts career ==
=== Early career ===
After compiling a 4-0 amateur record, Hawes made his professional debut in 2014.

=== The Ultimate Fighter ===
After going 3–0 on the regional scene, Hawes was invited as one of the 16 Light Heavyweight fighters invited to the cast The Ultimate Fighter 23.

He lost his entry fight against Andrew Sanchez via unanimous decision.

=== World Series of Fighting/Contender Series ===
Hawes signed with World Series of Fighting, debuting at WSOF 31 against Joshua Kay. He won the bout via TKO in the first round.

Hawes would then face future PFL champion Louis Taylor, on short notice as a replacement for Shamil Gamzatov, at WSOF 32. He lost the bout via guillotine submission in round 2.

Hawes participated in Dana White's Contender Series 4 on August 1, 2017 against Julian Marquez. He lost the fight by knockout after getting hit with a head kick in the second round.

=== Bellator MMA ===
After his loss to Marquez, Hawes took two years off and moved to Thailand to train Muay Thai and competed in competitions there. On April 22, 2018, in the MAX Muay Thai Stadium, he won by unanimous decision against Reza Goodary, an Iranian fighter.

Hawes faced Michael Wilcox on June 14, 2019 at Bellator 222. He won the bout via doctor stoppage after the first round when Wilcox was ruled unable to continue.

=== Brave Combat Federation ===
Signing with Brave Combat Federation, scoring a first-round submission over Dominik Schober at Brave CF 30, in India, and a TKO victory over Yuri Fraga less than two months later, at Brave CF 34, in Slovenia.

=== Ultimate Fighting Championship ===
After picking up three straight wins in Bellator and Brave, Hawes was invited once more to earn a UFC contract on Dana White's Contender Series 32 on September 8, 2020, against Khadzhimurat Bestaev. He won the bout and the contract via TKO in the first round.

Hawes made his UFC debut at UFC 254 on October 24, 2020, against Jacob Malkoun. He finished the fight in the first exchange, knocking Malkoun unconscious in 18 seconds.

Hawes faced Nassourdine Imavov at UFC Fight Night: Blaydes vs. Lewis on February 20, 2021. Hawes survived a late storm by Imavov to win the bout via majority decision.

Hawes faced Kyle Daukaus on May 8, 2021, at UFC on ESPN: Rodriguez vs. Waterson. He won the fight via unanimous decision.

Hawes was scheduled to face Deron Winn at UFC on ESPN 26 on July 17, 2021. However, Winn was forced to pull out from the event, citing separated rib and torn cartilage, and the bout was rescheduled at UFC Fight Night 194 on October 9, 2021. In turn, Winn withdrew the day before the event due to health issues. He was briefly expected to be replaced by Chris Curtis, however Hawes declined the bout and it was ultimately scrapped.

Hawes faced Chris Curtis on November 6, 2021, at UFC 268. He lost the fight by KO in the first round.

Hawes was scheduled to face Sam Alvey, replacing Ian Heinisch, on February 5, 2022, at UFC Fight Night 200. However, Hawes withdrew from the bout due to an undisclosed injury and he was replaced by Brendan Allen.

Hawes faced Deron Winn on June 18, 2022, at UFC on ESPN 37. After dominating the first round with his striking, Hawes won the fight via technical knockout in round two. This win earned him the Performance of the Night award.

Hawes faced Roman Dolidze on October 29, 2022, at UFC Fight Night 213. He lost the fight via knockout in round one.

Hawes faced promotional newcomer Ikram Aliskerov on May 6, 2023, at UFC 288. He lost the fight via knockout in the first round.

Hawes faced Brunno Ferreira on January 13, 2024, at UFC Fight Night 234. He lost for the third time in a row via knockout in the first round.

On February 6, 2024, it was reported that Hawes was no longer on the UFC roster.

=== Global Fight League ===
On December 11, 2024, it was announced that Hawes was signed by Global Fight League.

Hawes was scheduled to face Grant Neal on May 25, 2025 at GFL 2. However, all GFL events were cancelled indefinitely.

== Dirty Boxing Career ==
Hawes made his debut with Mike Perry's "Dirty Boxing Championships" at Dirty Boxing Championship 2 on June 14, 2025. He faced Sasha Palatnikov, losing via disqualification in the first round, due to repeated eye pokes.

Hawes faced Sergei Martynov at Dirty Boxing Championship 3 on August 29, 2025. He lost via unanimous decision.

== Submission grappling career ==
Hawes faced Luke Fernandez for the cruiserweight title at Cage Fury BJJ 14 on July 25, 2025. He lost the match by submission.

== Championships and accomplishments ==
- Ultimate Fighting Championship
  - Performance of the Night (One time) vs. Deron Winn

== Mixed martial arts record ==
Professional record breakdown
18 matches	12 wins	6 losses
By knockout	8	5
By submission	2	1
By decision	2	0

Res.	Record	Opponent	Method	Event	Date	Round	Time	Location	Notes
Loss	12–6	Brunno Ferreira	KO (punches)	UFC Fight Night: Ankalaev vs. Walker 2	January 13, 2024	1	4:55	Las Vegas, Nevada, United States	
Loss	12–5	Ikram Aliskerov	KO (punches)	UFC 288	May 6, 2023	1	2:10	Newark, New Jersey, United States	
Loss	12–4	Roman Dolidze	KO (punches)	UFC Fight Night: Kattar vs. Allen	October 29, 2022	1	4:09	Las Vegas, Nevada, United States	
Win	12–3	Deron Winn	TKO (elbows)	UFC on ESPN: Kattar vs. Emmett	June 18, 2022	2	4:25	Austin, Texas, United States	Performance of the Night.
Loss	11–3	Chris Curtis	KO (punches)	UFC 268	November 6, 2021	1	4:27	New York City, New York, United States	
Win	11–2	Kyle Daukaus	Decision (unanimous)	UFC on ESPN: Rodriguez vs. Waterson	May 8, 2021	3	5:00	Las Vegas, Nevada, United States	
Win	10–2	Nassourdine Imavov	Decision (majority)	UFC Fight Night: Blaydes vs. Lewis	February 20, 2021	3	5:00	Las Vegas, Nevada, United States	
Win	9–2	Jacob Malkoun	KO (punches)	UFC 254	October 24, 2020	1	0:18	Abu Dhabi, United Arab Emirates	
Win	8–2	Khadzhimurat Bestaev	TKO (punches)	Dana White's Contender Series 32	September 8, 2020	1	1:18	Las Vegas, Nevada, United States	
Win	7–2	Yuri Fraga	TKO (punches)	Brave CF 34	January 19, 2020	1	4:42	Ljubljana, Slovenia	
Win	6–2	Dominic Schober	Submission (rear-naked choke)	Brave CF 30	November 23, 2019	1	3:45	Hyderabad, India	
Win	5–2	Michael Wilcox	TKO (doctor stoppage)	Bellator 222	June 14, 2019	1	5:00	New York City, New York, United States	
Loss	4–2	Julian Marquez	KO (head kick)	Dana White's Contender Series 4	August 1, 2017	2	2:20	Las Vegas, Nevada, United States	
Loss	4–1	Louis Taylor	Submission (guillotine choke)	WSOF 32	July 30, 2016	2	2:15	Everett, Washington, United States	
Win	4–0	Joshua Key	TKO (elbows)	WSOF 31	June 17, 2016	1	2:52	Mashantucket, Connecticut, United States	
Win	3–0	Brandon Collins	Submission (armbar)	Global Knockout 2	October 18, 2014	1	3:06	Jackson, California, United States	
Win	2–0	Anthony Pinckard	TKO (punches)	Global Knockout: The Return	June 14, 2014	2	0:25	Jackson, California, United States	
Win	1–0	Brian Cheatham	TKO (punches)	Legacy FC 28	February 21, 2014	2	0:55	San Antonio, Texas, United States	Middleweight debut.

Exhibition record breakdown		
1 match	0 wins	1 loss
By decision	0	1

Res.	Record	Opponent	Method	Event	Date	Round	Time	Location	Notes
Loss	0–1	Andrew Sanchez	Decision (unanimous)	The Ultimate Fighter: Team Joanna vs. Team Cláudia	January 26, 2016	2	5:00	Las Vegas, Nevada, United States	The Ultimate Fighter 23 Elimination round

== Muay Thai record ==
Muay Thai record
1 Wins (0 (T)KO's, 1 Decisions), 0 Losses (0 (T)KO's, 0 Decision), 0 Draws
Date	Result	Opponent	Event	Location	Method	Round	Time
2018-04-22	Win	(Iran) Reza Goodary	MAX Muay Thai - Ultimate Fight	Pattaya, Thailand	Decision (Unanimous)	3	3:00
Legend: Win Loss Draw/No contest Notes

== Dirty Boxing Record ==
Professional record breakdown
2 matches	0 wins	2 losses
By decision	0	1
By disqualification	0	1

Res	Record	Opponent	Method	Event	Date	Round	Time	Location	Notes
Loss	0-2	Sergei Martynov	Decision (Unanimous)	Dirty Boxing Championship 3	August 29, 2025	3	3:00	The Hangar at Regatta Harbour, Miami, Florida, USA	
Loss	0-1	Sasha Palatnikov	Disqualification (Eye Pokes)	Dirty Boxing Championship 2	June 14, 2025	1	3:00	The Hangar at Regatta Harbour, Miami, Florida, USA	Dirty Boxing Debut

== See also ==
- List of male mixed martial artists
