= Adrian Yañez =

American mixed martial arts fighter (born 1993)

- Born: November 29, 1993 (age 32); Houston, Texas, U.S.
- Height: 5 ft 7 in (1.70 m)
- Weight: 135 lb (61 kg; 9 st 9 lb)
- Division: Bantamweight
- Reach: 70 in (178 cm)
- Stance: Orthodox
- Fighting out of: Houston, Texas, U.S.
- Team: Elite MMA (formerly); Metro Fight Club (2012–present)
- Rank: Black belt in Brazilian jiu-jitsu under Saul Soliz
- Years active: 2014–present

Mixed martial arts record
- Total: 25
- Wins: 18
- By knockout: 12
- By submission: 2
- By decision: 4
- Losses: 6
- By knockout: 2
- By decision: 4
- Draws: 1

Other information
- Mixed martial arts record from Sherdog

Adrian Yañez (born November 29, 1993) is an American professional mixed martial artist who currently competes in the Bantamweight division of the Ultimate Fighting Championship (UFC).

== Background ==
Adrian Yañez was born in Houston and grew up in La Porte, Texas. His father being a Golden Gloves winner, Yañez went into boxing from a young age, but later on took up BJJ. He started training MMA at the age of 15, having his first fight at the age of 17. Before the UFC, Yañez worked for the City of Deer Park as a Meter Reader. For most of his mixed martial arts career Yañez trained under late Saul Soliz in Houston, TX.

== Mixed martial arts career ==
=== Early career ===
After finishing a successful 6-0 amateur career with four consecutive TKO’s, Yañez made his professional debut at just 20 years old, and ended with Yañez victorious by TKO in the third round. Suffering his first defeat against Levi Mowles in his very next bout, having no answer for the wrestling and ground and pound, he lost via unanimous decision. The Texan recovered with two victories in Fury FC, and then won his Bellator debut at Bellator 149 against Ryan Hollis via unanimous decision. Yañez then dropped a razor thin split decision to future UFC bantamweight Domingo Pilarte at LFA 7. Winning his next two bouts in the promotion, Yañez faced another current UFC fighter Miles Johns for the vacant LFA Bantamweight Champion at LFA 55. With history repeating itself, Yañez was on the wrong end of a close split decision loss. With two stoppage wins over Warren Stewart and Michael Rodriguez and then winning a split decision against Kyle Estrada at LFA 78, Yañez was invited to Dana White's Contender Series 28, where he defeated Brady Huang in 39 seconds, earning a UFC contract in the process.

=== Ultimate Fighting Championship ===
Yañez was scheduled to make his UFC debut against Aaron Phillips on October 31, 2020, at UFC Fight Night 181. However on October 20, Phillips pulled out due to an undisclosed injury. Instead, Yañez faced promotional newcomer Victor Rodriguez. Yañez won the bout via head kick knockout in the first round. This win earned him Performance Fight of the Night award.

Yañez faced Gustavo Lopez on March 20, 2021, at UFC on ESPN 21. He won the fight via walkoff knockout in round three. This win earned him the Performance of the Night award.

Yañez faced Randy Costa at UFC on ESPN 27 on July 24, 2021. After getting dominated in the first round, Yañez rallied back in the second round winning by technical knockout. This fight earned him the Performance of the Night award.

As the first bout of his new four-fight contract, Yañez faced Davey Grant on November 20, 2021, at UFC Fight Night 198. He won the bout via split decision, although 12 of 12 media scores gave it to Yañez. The bout earned both fighters the Fight of the Night award.

Yañez faced Tony Kelley on June 18, 2022, at UFC on ESPN 37. At the weigh-ins on June 17, Kelley weighed in at 137.5 pounds, 1.5 pounds over the non-title bantamweight limit. As a result, the bout proceeded as a catchweight and Kelley forfeited 20% of his purse to Yañez. He won the bout in the first round via TKO stoppage. This win earned him his fourth Performance of the Night award.

Yañez faced Rob Font on April 8, 2023, at UFC 287 He lost the bout via TKO in the first round.

Yañez faced Jonathan Martinez on October 14, 2023, at UFC Fight Night 230. After being dropped twice with leg kicks, Yañez lost the fight via TKO in round two.

Yañez faced Vinicius Salvador on May 18, 2024, at UFC Fight Night 241. He won the bout by technical knockout from punches in the first round.

Replacing Said Nurmagomedov who withdrew for unknown reasons, Yañez faced Daniel Marcos on December 14, 2024 at UFC on ESPN 63. Yanez lost the fight by split decision.

Yañez was scheduled to face Cristian Quiñónez on November 8, 2025 at UFC on ESPN 73. However during fight week, Quiñónez withdrew from the bout for unknown reasons and the bout was subsequently cancelled.

Yañez faced Ricky Simón on March 28, 2026 at UFC Fight Night 271. The bout was declared a majority draw. 14 out of 15 media outlets scored the bout for Yanez.

Yañez faced Cody Garbrandt on July 11, 2026, at UFC 329. He won the fight by technical knockout in the first round.

Yañez was scheduled to face Juan Díaz on November 14, 2026, at UFC 334. However, Yañez had to withdraw in mid October due to injury.

== Personal life ==
Yañez has a son (born 2021).

== Championships and achievements ==
- Ultimate Fighting Championship
  - Performance of the Night (Four times) vs. Victor Rodriguez, Gustavo Lopez, Randy Costa, and Tony Kelley
  - Fight of the Night (One Time) vs. Davey Grant
  - Tied (Rob Font, Marlon Vera & Song Yadong) for third most knockouts in UFC Bantamweight division history (6)
  - UFC.com Awards
    - 2022: Ranked #9 Knockout of the Year vs. Tony Kelley

== Mixed martial arts record ==
Professional record breakdown
| 25 matches | 18 wins | 6 losses |
| By knockout | 12 | 2 |
| By submission | 2 | 0 |
| By decision | 4 | 4 |
| Draws | 1 | |

| Res. | Record | Opponent | Method | Event | Date | Round | Time | Location | Notes |
|---|---|---|---|---|---|---|---|---|---|
| Win | 18–6–1 | Cody Garbrandt | TKO (punches) | UFC 329 | July 11, 2026 | 1 | 2:47 | Las Vegas, Nevada, United States | |
| Draw | 17–6–1 | Ricky Simón | Draw (majority) | UFC Fight Night: Adesanya vs. Pyfer | March 28, 2026 | 3 | 5:00 | Seattle, Washington, United States | |
| Loss | 17–6 | Daniel Marcos | Decision (split) | UFC on ESPN: Covington vs. Buckley | December 14, 2024 | 3 | 5:00 | Tampa, Florida, United States | |
| Win | 17–5 | Vinicius Salvador | TKO (punches) | UFC Fight Night: Barboza vs. Murphy | May 18, 2024 | 1 | 2:47 | Las Vegas, Nevada, United States | |
| Loss | 16–5 | Jonathan Martinez | TKO (leg kick) | UFC Fight Night: Yusuff vs. Barboza | October 14, 2023 | 2 | 2:26 | Las Vegas, Nevada, United States | |
| Loss | 16–4 | Rob Font | TKO (punches) | UFC 287 | April 8, 2023 | 1 | 2:57 | Miami, Florida, United States | |
| Win | 16–3 | Tony Kelley | TKO (punches) | UFC on ESPN: Kattar vs. Emmett | June 18, 2022 | 1 | 3:49 | Austin, Texas, United States | Catchweight (137.5 lb) bout; Kelley missed weight. Performance of the Night. |
| Win | 15–3 | Davey Grant | Decision (split) | UFC Fight Night: Vieira vs. Tate | November 20, 2021 | 3 | 5:00 | Las Vegas, Nevada, United States | Fight of the Night. |
| Win | 14–3 | Randy Costa | TKO (punches) | UFC on ESPN: Sandhagen vs. Dillashaw | July 24, 2021 | 2 | 2:11 | Las Vegas, Nevada, United States | Performance of the Night. |
| Win | 13–3 | Gustavo Lopez | KO (punch) | UFC on ESPN: Brunson vs. Holland | March 20, 2021 | 3 | 0:27 | Las Vegas, Nevada, United States | Performance of the Night. |
| Win | 12–3 | Victor Rodriguez | KO (head kick) | UFC Fight Night: Hall vs. Silva | October 31, 2020 | 1 | 2:46 | Las Vegas, Nevada, United States | Performance of the Night. |
| Win | 11–3 | Brady Huang | TKO (punches) | Dana White's Contender Series 28 | August 11, 2020 | 1 | 0:39 | Las Vegas, Nevada, United States | |
| Win | 10–3 | Kyle Estrada | Decision (split) | LFA 78 | November 15, 2019 | 3 | 5:00 | Belton, Texas, United States | |
| Win | 9–3 | Michael Rodriguez | TKO (punches) | Fury FC 33 | June 29, 2019 | 1 | 3:14 | Houston, Texas, United States | |
| Win | 8–3 | Warren Stewart | TKO (punches) | Fury FC 29 | January 25, 2019 | 2 | 1:46 | Humble, Texas, United States | |
| Loss | 7–3 | Miles Johns | Decision (split) | LFA 55 | November 30, 2018 | 5 | 5:00 | Dallas, Texas, United States | For the vacant LFA Bantamweight Championship. |
| Win | 7–2 | Nathan Trepagnier | KO (punch) | LFA 35 | March 9, 2018 | 1 | 4:56 | Houston, Texas, United States | Catchweight (140 lb) bout; Trepagnier missed weight. |
| Win | 6–2 | Trent Meaux | Decision (unanimous) | LFA 26 | November 3, 2017 | 3 | 5:00 | Houston, Texas, United States | |
| Loss | 5–2 | Domingo Pilarte | Decision (split) | LFA 7 | March 24, 2017 | 3 | 5:00 | Houston, Texas, United States | |
| Win | 5–1 | Colin Wright | Submission (armbar) | Legacy FC 59 | September 16, 2016 | 3 | 2:44 | Houston, Texas, United States | |
| Win | 4–1 | Ryan Hollis | Decision (unanimous) | Bellator 149 | February 19, 2016 | 3 | 5:00 | Houston, Texas, United States | Return to Bantamweight. |
| Win | 3–1 | D'Nearon Seymore | Submission (triangle choke) | Fury FC 7 | July 11, 2015 | 1 | 1:31 | Humble, Texas, United States | Featherweight debut. |
| Win | 2–1 | Jake Snyder | TKO (punches) | Fury FC 6 | May 22, 2015 | 2 | 0:10 | Humble, Texas, United States | |
| Loss | 1–1 | Levi Mowles | Decision (unanimous) | Legacy FC 37 | November 14, 2014 | 3 | 5:00 | Houston, Texas, United States | |
| Win | 1–0 | Richard Delfin | TKO (punches) | Texas City Throwdown 1 | March 14, 2014 | 3 | 0:28 | Texas City, Texas, United States | Bantamweight debut. |

== See also ==
- List of current UFC fighters
- List of Dana White's Contender Series alumni
- List of male mixed martial artists
