= Maki Pitolo =

American mixed martial arts fighter

- Born: Maki Ikaika Maleko Pitolo; November 24, 1990 (age 35); Honolulu, Hawaii, United States
- Other names: Coconut Bombz
- Height: 5 ft 9 in (1.75 m)
- Weight: 185 lb (84 kg; 13 st 3 lb)
- Division: Middleweight (2019–present); Welterweight (2013–2018, 2019)
- Reach: 73.5 in (187 cm)
- Stance: Orthodox
- Fighting out of: Nanakuli, Hawaii
- Team: West Oahu MMA; Gracie Technics
- Years active: 2013–present

Mixed martial arts record
- Total: 28
- Wins: 16
- By knockout: 8
- By submission: 4
- By decision: 4
- Losses: 12
- By knockout: 5
- By submission: 5
- By decision: 2

Other information
- Mixed martial arts record from Sherdog

Maki Ikaika Maleko Pitolo (born November 24, 1990) is an American mixed martial artist who competes in the Middleweight division. A professional mixed martial artist since 2013, Pitolo has also competed for the Ultimate Fighting Championship and Bellator MMA.

== Background ==
Pitolo played football in high school, and started training mixed martial arts to stay in shape during the offseason. Eventually after seeing Forrest Griffin vs. Stephan Bonnar, he decided to pursue a career in the sport. He has a little brother Alphonso, who is also a mixed martial artist.

== Mixed martial arts career ==
=== Early career ===
At the beginning of his mixed martial arts career, Pitolo fought primarily in Hawaii regional scene. After racking up a record of 6–2, he fought five times for the Victory Fighting Championship where he amassed three straight wins before getting stopped in two consecutive fights. After the tenure in VFC, Pitolo faced Thiago Rela at CFFC 68 on October 21, 2017, winning the fight via first-minute knockout. He was expected to face Stephen Regman at CFFC 70 on March 24, 2018, but the bout was cancelled.

Pitolo was scheduled to face Chibwikem Onyenegecha at Dana White's Contender Series 13 on July 17, 2018, but a shoulder injury forced him to withdraw from the bout and he was replaced by Anthony Adams.

=== Bellator ===
After the one-off bout in Cage Fury FC, Pitolo faced Chris Cisneros in a rematch at Bellator 213 on December 15, 2018. He won the fight via third-round submission.

=== DWCS and Ultimate Fighting Championship ===
After the lone bout in Bellator, Pitolo was once again invited to Dana White's Contender Series. Pitolo faced Justin Sumter at Dana White's Contender Series 19 on July 9, 2019. He won the fight via first round technical knockout and was awarded a UFC contract.

As per Dana White's wish after the bout, Maki made his return to welterweight in his UFC debut and faced Callan Potter on 5 October 2019 at UFC 243. He lost the fight via unanimous decision.

Pitolo was scheduled to face Takashi Sato at UFC Fight Night 168 on February 23, 2020. However, Pitolo was unable to make weight and the bout was scrapped from the card.

Due to the botched weight cut preceding the previous fight, Pitolo returned to the Middleweight division for his next fight against Charles Byrd at UFC 250 on June 6, 2020. He won the bout via second round technical knockout,

Pitolo faced Darren Stewart on 8 August 2020 at UFC Fight Night 174. He lost in the first round via guillotine choke.

Pitolo was tabbed for a quick turnaround and faced promotional newcomer Impa Kasanganay on August 29, 2020, at UFC Fight Night: Smith vs. Rakić. He lost the fight via unanimous decision.

Pitolo faced Julian Marquez on February 13, 2021, at UFC 258. He lost the bout via an anaconda choke in the third round.

Pitolo was scheduled to face Duško Todorović on June 5, 2021, at UFC Fight Night: Rozenstruik vs. Sakai. However, two weeks ahead of the bout, Pitolo had to pull out for unknown reasons and was replaced by Gregory Rodrigues.

The bout between Pitolo and Todorović was rescheduled for December 4, 2021, at UFC on ESPN 31. He lost the fight via technical knockout in round one.

On January 12, 2022, it was announced that Pitolo was no longer on the UFC roster.

=== Post-UFC ===
Pitolo made his first appearance outside of the UFC at Tuff-N-Uff 127 on March 4, 2022, facing Fernando Gonzalez. He won the bout via unanimous decision.

Pitolo made his debut with Eagle FC against Doug Usher on May 20, 2022, at Eagle FC 47. At weigh ins, Maki Pitolo and Doug Usher missed weight and the bout changed from Middleweight to Light Heavyweight. Pitolo weighed in at 187.4 pounds while Usher weighed in at 189 pounds. Pitolo won by knockout in the opening minute of the fight.

Pitolo faced Daniel Compton on November 20, 2022, at Tuff-N-Uff 130 for the TUFF Middleweight Championship. He was submitted in the third round by the way of a kimura, after which Compton went into the crowd to confront Pitolo's fans.

Pitolo faced Joel Bauman on September 8, 2023, at Gamebred Fighting Championship 5, losing the bout via second round head kick TKO.

=== Bare Knuckle Fighting Championship ===
Pitolo made his Bare Knuckle Fighting Championship debut against Doug Coltrane at BKFC Fight Night 36 in Honolulu, Hawaii, on April 11, 2026. He lost the fight by knockout at the end of the first round.

== Personal life ==
Maki and his wife Chasity have two children, Miya and Madyx.

== Mixed martial arts record ==
Professional record breakdown
28 matches	16 wins	12 losses
By knockout	8	5
By submission	4	5
By decision	4	2

Res.	Record	Opponent	Method	Event	Date	Round	Time	Location	Notes
Win	16–12	Armus Guyton	Submission (rear-naked choke)	Tuff-N-Uff 149	October 25, 2025	2	2:10	Las Vegas, Nevada, United States	Catchweight (180 lb) bout.
Loss	15–12	Eric McConico	TKO (head kick and punches)	Tuff-N-Uff 134	November 12, 2023	3	2:35	Las Vegas, Nevada, United States	Catchweight (195 lb) bout.
Loss	15–11	Joel Bauman	TKO (head kicks and punches)	Gamebred Bareknuckle MMA 5	September 8, 2023	2	2:36	Jacksonville, Florida, United States	Bare Knuckle MMA.
Loss	15–10	Daniel Compton	Submission (kimura)	Tuff-N-Uff 130	November 20, 2022	3	1:39	Las Vegas, Nevada, United States	For the TUFF Middleweight Championship.
Win	15–9	Doug Usher	KO (punches)	Eagle FC 47	May 20, 2022	1	0:30	Miami, Florida, United States	Catchweight (189 lb) bout; Pitolo and Usher both missed weight.
Win	14–9	Fernando Gonzalez	Decision (unanimous)	Tuff-N-Uff 127	March 4, 2022	3	5:00	Las Vegas, Nevada, United States	
Loss	13–9	Duško Todorović	TKO (punches)	UFC on ESPN: Font vs. Aldo	December 4, 2021	1	4:34	Las Vegas, Nevada, United States	
Loss	13–8	Julian Marquez	Submission (anaconda choke)	UFC 258	February 13, 2021	3	4:17	Las Vegas, Nevada, United States	
Loss	13–7	Impa Kasanganay	Decision (unanimous)	UFC Fight Night: Smith vs. Rakić	August 29, 2020	3	5:00	Las Vegas, Nevada, United States	
Loss	13–6	Darren Stewart	Submission (guillotine choke)	UFC Fight Night: Lewis vs. Oleinik	August 8, 2020	1	3:41	Las Vegas, Nevada, United States	
Win	13–5	Charles Byrd	TKO (punches)	UFC 250	June 6, 2020	2	1:10	Las Vegas, Nevada, United States	
Loss	12–5	Callan Potter	Decision (unanimous)	UFC 243	October 5, 2019	3	5:00	Melbourne, Australia	Welterweight bout.
Win	12–4	Justin Michael Sumter	TKO (punches)	Dana White's Contender Series 19	July 9, 2019	1	1:37	Las Vegas, Nevada, United States	Middleweight debut.
Win	11–4	Chris Cisneros	Submission (rear-naked choke)	Bellator 213	December 15, 2018	3	2:40	Honolulu, Hawaii, United States	Catchweight (180 lb) bout.
Win	10–4	Thiago Rela	KO (punch)	Cage Fury FC 68	October 21, 2017	1	0:59	Atlantic City, New Jersey, United States	Catchweight (173.2 lb) bout; Pitolo missed weight.
Loss	9–4	Dakota Cochrane	Submission (guillotine choke)	Victory FC 58	July 22, 2017	2	4:58	Omaha, Nebraska, United States	
Loss	9–3	Kassius Kayne	KO (punch)	Victory FC 54	December 9, 2016	2	0:05	Omaha, Nebraska, United States	Lost the VFC Welterweight Championship.
Win	9–2	Kassius Kayne	Decision (unanimous)	Victory FC 52	July 16, 2016	5	5:00	Omaha, Nebraska, United States	Won the VFC Welterweight Championship.
Win	8–2	Justin Guthrie	TKO (punches)	Victory FC 50	May 21, 2016	1	0:48	Topeka, Kansas, United States	
Win	7–2	Andrews Nakahara	TKO (punches)	Victory FC 49	April 1, 2016	2	2:21	Omaha, Nebraska, United States	
Win	6–2	Adam Smith	Submission (guillotine choke)	Destiny MMA: Na Koa 9	April 11, 2015	1	3:23	Honolulu, Hawaii, United States	
Win	5–2	Pono Pananganan	TKO (punches)	Ainofea Cage Fights	February 15, 2015	1	2:44	Lihue, Hawaii, United States	
Win	4–2	Paul Norman	TKO (punches)	RWE: Just Scrap	14 November 2014	1	4:31	Hilo, Hawaii, United States	Catchweight (180 lb) bout.
Win	3–2	Taki Uluilakepa	Submission (rear-naked choke)	Destiny MMA: Na Koa 7	November 2, 2014	2	N/A	Honolulu, Hawaii, United States	
Win	2–2	Coates Cobb-Adams	Decision (unanimous)	X–1: Jara vs. Vitale	September 26, 2014	3	5:00	Honolulu, Hawaii, United States	
Loss	1–2	C.J. Marsh	TKO (punches)	Destiny MMA: Na Koa 5	May 3, 2014	1	N/A	Honolulu, Hawaii, United States	
Loss	1–1	Chris Cisneros	Submission (armbar)	Destiny MMA: Proving Grounds 2	August 24, 2013	1	N/A	Honolulu, Hawaii, United States	
Win	1–0	Jason Camarillo	Decision (unanimous)	X–1: Mayhem at the Mansion 4	February 16, 2013	3	5:00	Puhi, Hawaii, United States	Welterweight debut.

== Bare knuckle record ==
Professional record breakdown
1 match	0 wins	1 loss
By knockout	0	1

Res.	Record	Opponent	Method	Event	Date	Round	Time	Location	Notes
Loss	1–0	Doug Coltrane	KO	BKFC Fight Night Honolulu: Pitolo vs. Coltrane	April 11, 2026	1	1:59	Honolulu, Hawaii, United States	

== See also ==
- List of male mixed martial artists
