= Saul Soliz =

American mixed martial arts trainer (died 2021)

- Soliz in an undated photo
- Born: 1965 or 1966
- Died: August 17, 2021 (aged 55); Houston, Texas, U.S.
- Years active: c. 1993–2021

Other information
- Occupation: Mixed martial arts trainer
- Spouse: Toi
- Children: Sapphira Cristál
Notable students
Notable students	Tito Ortiz; Ricco Rodriguez; Cris Cyborg; Quinton Jackson; Mark Coleman; Michael Bisping; Mark Kerr; Kevin Randleman; Mike Bronzoulis; Matt Hamill; Wes Sims; Pete Spratt; Melvin Guillard; Carlo Prater; Jonathan Brookins; Aaron Rosa; Tim Credeur; Yves Edwards; Adrian Yanez

Saul Soliz (1965/1966 – August 17, 2021) was an American mixed martial arts trainer known as "the godfather of Texas MMA". Beginning in the 1990s, he helped establish the sport in Texas. After organizing informal cage matches for some time, Soliz helped the Texas Department of Licensing and Regulation develop the state's MMA rules. He founded the Renegades Extreme Fighting promotion in 2000. An instructor of Muay Thai and Brazilian jiu-jitsu, Soliz owned a gym in Houston and trained UFC and Pride FC champions including Tito Ortiz, Ricco Rodriguez and Cris Cyborg. He coached alongside Ortiz on two seasons of The Ultimate Fighter. Following his death from COVID-19 in August 2021, Soliz was widely memorialized in the MMA community.

== Career ==
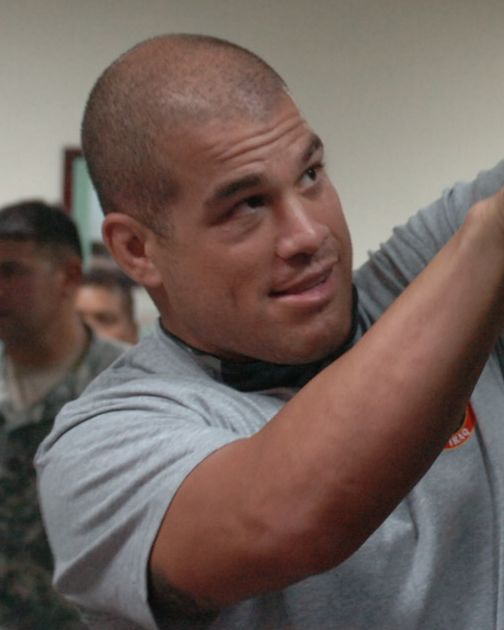
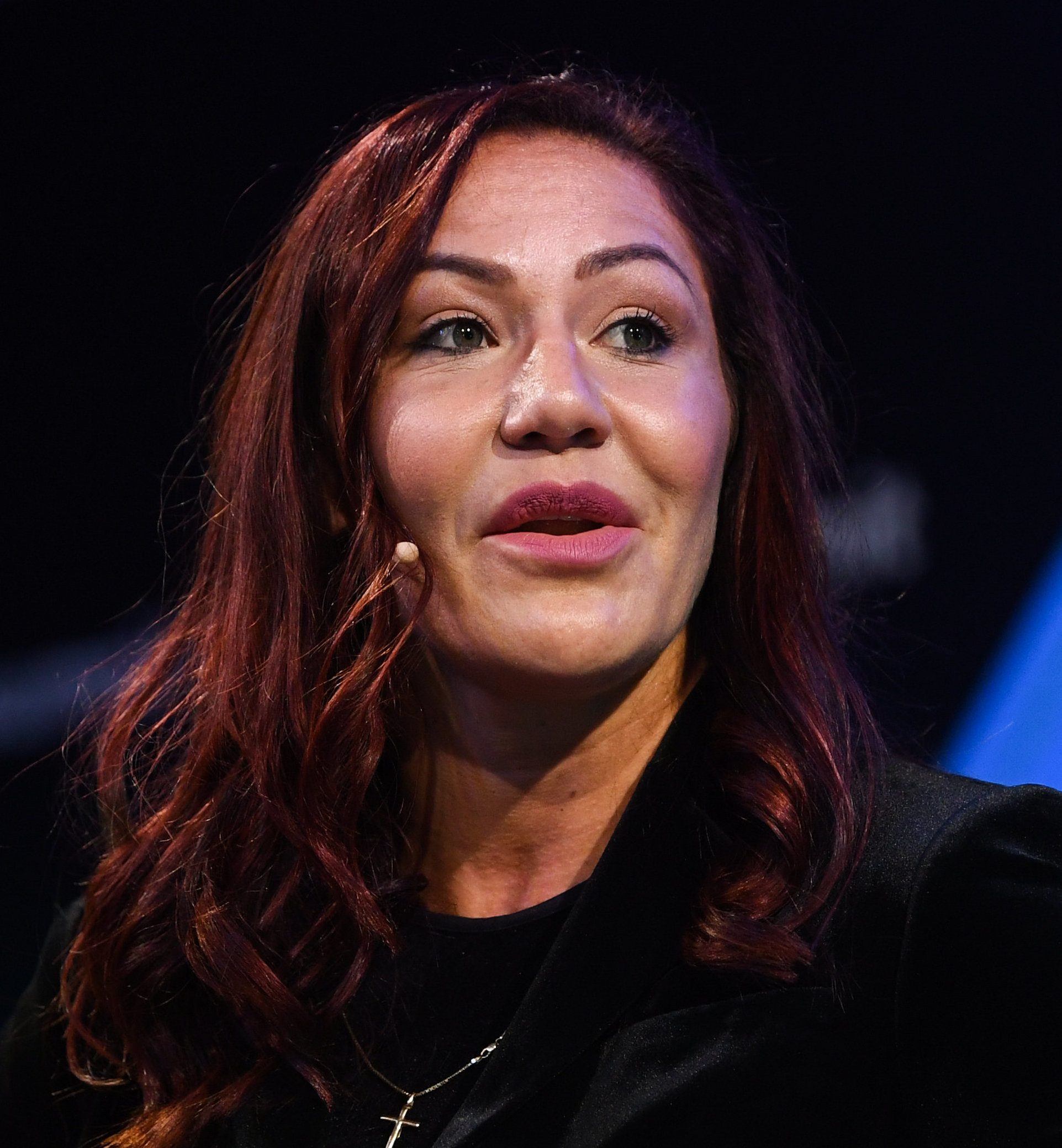
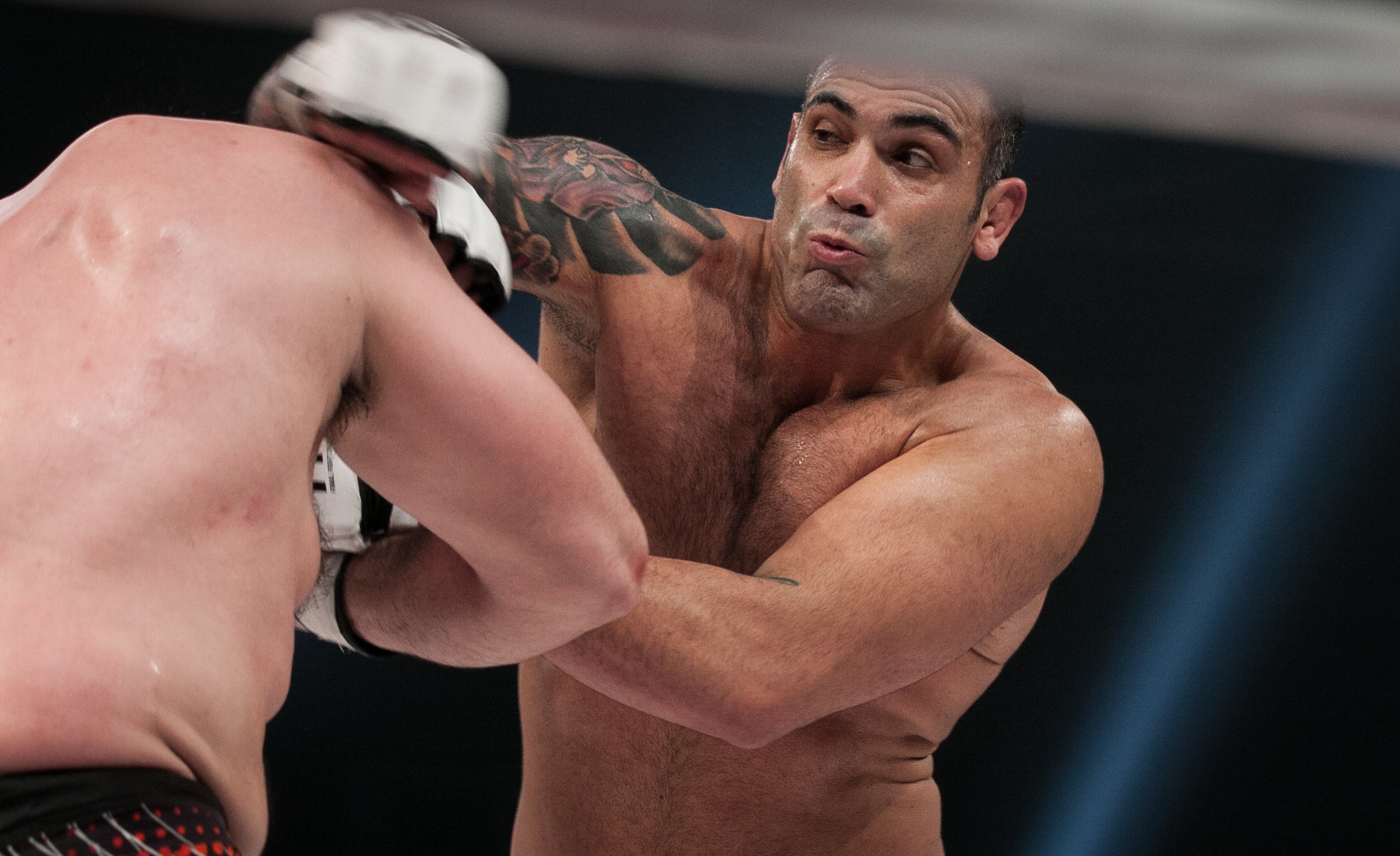
Soliz's students include, clockwise from top left: Tito Ortiz, Cris Cyborg and Ricco Rodriguez.

Nickamed "the godfather of Texas MMA", Soliz began running mixed martial arts cage matches at bars in Texas in the mid-1990s, before the sport had mainstream recognition. According to the Houston Chronicle, he was "the first person in [Houston] to apply for a license to promote MMA and to put on live shows". Soliz worked with the Texas Department of Licensing and Regulation to develop the state's MMA rules. In 2000, he established a promotion called Renegades Extreme Fighting, which operated in Houston and Dallas. MMA fighters such as Todd Moore began their professional careers in Renegades.

Sources conflict on the year Soliz's martial arts training career began. At the time of his death in 2021, KTRK-TV reported that he had trained fighters for 26 years. His Yahoo Sports obituary stated: "Soliz was an MMA trainer and competitor for 14 years, according to [his] gym's website, though his Muay Thai experience stretched 26 years." His profile on that website lists "26 years of experience in Muay Thai, 19 years as instructor". In an undated video interview, Soliz said: "I started after I saw the UFC in '93. I was already doing Thai boxing, and I wanted to learn jiu-jitsu, so I found some guys who taught jiu-jitsu, incorporated it into my training program, and started doing MMA." He held a black belt in Brazilian jiu-jitsu for at least the last 14 years of his life.

Soliz trained MMA fighters both in Texas and internationally. A number of his pupils went on to become UFC and Pride FC champions, including Tito Ortiz, Ricco Rodriguez, Cris Cyborg, Quinton Jackson, Mark Coleman, Michael Bisping and Mark Kerr. Soliz also taught Kevin Randleman, Mike Bronzoulis, Matt Hamill, Wes Sims, Pete Spratt, Melvin Guillard, Carlo Prater, Jonathan Brookins, Aaron Rosa, Tim Credeur and Yves Edwards. In 2013, he "was enlisted to give former boxing heavyweight contender Lou Savarese a crash course in MMA when Savarese decided to cross over from one sport to another".

Together with Ortiz, Soliz appeared as a coach on the third and eleventh seasons of The Ultimate Fighter. From at least 2006 until his death, he was the head coach and owner of the Houston Metro Fight Club, where he devoted much of his time to training young talents, including Adrian Yanez and Mana Martinez.

== Personal life and death ==
Soliz and his wife, Toi, had a son, O’Neill, who performs in drag as Sapphira Cristál.

On November 18, 1998, Soliz was attacked by a mailman in an apparent case of road rage. Describing the incident, Soliz stated that the mail truck driver first tailgated and verbally assailed him, which prompted him to pull over to allow the truck to overtake him. The driver "stopped the postal truck in the middle of street and ran toward him with Mace in his hands and screaming", then "sprayed him with Mace for five to 10 seconds". Soliz attempted to sue the United States Postal Service for compensation, but his case was dismissed in May 2001, when a federal judge ruled that "the government cannot be held liable for an assault committed by a government employee".

In August 2021, Soliz fell ill with COVID-19 and was hospitalized for several weeks. He died on August 17, aged 55. His funeral was held in the Garden Oaks neighborhood of Houston.

== Legacy ==
No one [in Texas MMA] can say they weren't influenced directly or indirectly by Saul, including commission, promoters, fighters and coaches.

–UFC matchmaker Mick Maynard

In the days following Soliz's death, members of the global MMA community published tributes to him in the news and on social media. These included Cyborg, Bisping and many of his other fighters. The UFC Vegas 34 event on August 21 opened with a tribute to Soliz, and Martinez dedicated his debut UFC match on August 28 to his coach.

Speaking of his last phone call with Soliz, Yanez said: "I was just super happy to be able to tell him if it wasn't for him, I wouldn't be where I'm at. I've always tried to express that to him at every turn, every corner." Bronzoulis wrote: "My whole life flashed before my eyes. He was one of the biggest parts, if not the biggest part of my life.... I was a troubled kid and he set me down. He helped manifest this kid's broken dreams into reality. I got multiple world titles and he was there every step of the way."

== Filmography ==
=== Television ===
Year	Title	Role	Notes	Ref(s)
2006	The Ultimate Fighter 3	Himself	Team Ortiz	
2010	The Ultimate Fighter: Team Liddell vs. Team Ortiz	Himself	Team Ortiz	
