= Darren Stewart =

English mixed martial arts fighter

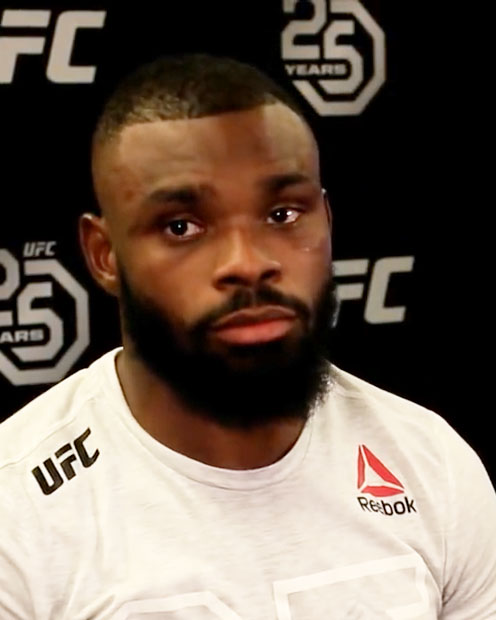
- Darren Stewart at UFC 228
- Born: Darren Erdley Springer-Stewart; 30 December 1990 (age 35); Poplar, London, England
- Other names: The Dentist
- Nationality: British
- Height: 5 ft 11 in (1.80 m)
- Weight: 195 lb (88 kg; 13 st 13 lb)
- Division: Middleweight; Light Heavyweight
- Reach: 74 in (188 cm)
- Team: The MMA Clinic
- Rank: Black belt in Taekwondo; Purple belt in Brazilian Jiu-Jitsu under Michael Russell
- Years active: 2013–2024

Mixed martial arts record
- Total: 28
- Wins: 16
- By knockout: 9
- By submission: 1
- By decision: 6
- Losses: 10
- By knockout: 2
- By submission: 2
- By decision: 6
- No contests: 2

Other information
- Mixed martial arts record from Sherdog

Darren Erdley Stewart (born 30 December 1990) is a retired English mixed martial artist. A professional competitor since 2013, he competed in the Middleweight division of the Ultimate Fighting Championship and Cage Warriors.

== Background ==
Stewart was born in Poplar, East London, England. His father was from Jamaica and his mother was from St Vincent. Encouraged by his mum, Stewart started MMA training at 13 for self-defence due to the crime rate was high in London with the youth during that time. His friend Regan Lawrence was at The MMA Clinic at that time and invited him to try on MMA, even though his initial thought was "I’m not doing that crap, cage fighting. I’ve seen the blood on TV. No way", but he eventually found MMA full contact striking exciting, and thrived where he competed in the UK and abroad.

Stewart worked as a full-time prison officer for the Crown Court in London Bridge.

== Mixed martial arts career ==
=== Early career ===
Stewart fought most of the fights in England and picked up seven consecutive wins with five by knockout before signed by UFC. He was the former Killacam light heavy weight champion in England.

=== Ultimate Fighting Championship ===
==== Light heavyweight ====
Stewart made his promotional debut on 17 September 2016, at UFC Fight Night: Bader vs. Nogueira 2 against Francimar Barroso at São Paulo, Brazil. Stewart was initially declared the winner of the fight via TKO, but the decision was overturned by Comissao Atletica Brasileira de MMA (CABMMA), after an appeal from Borroso, as a result from an accidental head butt prior Stewart rained down a series of heavy punches. The bout was finally declared as no contest. Calling for a rematch when UFC would return to London, Stewart was displeased with the CABMMA decision and commented "The entire situation stinks. I put a lot of time and money into this fight, won the fight, and his mates at the Brazilian MMA Commission overturned the decision. Fighting a Brazilian in Brazil is something that every fighter should think very strongly about. Had I lost and made an appeal to the Brazil commission, I doubt it would be overturned because I’m not from Brazil".

The match with Francimar Barroso was rescheduled on 18 March 2017, at UFC Fight Night: Manuwa vs. Anderson. He lost the fight via unanimous decision.

==== Middleweight ====
After losing to Barroso in March 2017, Stewart announced he would compete in the middleweight division.

Stewart faced Karl Roberson on 11 November 2017 at UFC Fight Night: Poirier vs. Pettis. He lost the fight via submission in the first round.

Stewart faced promotional newcomer Julian Marquez on 16 December 2017 at UFC on Fox 26. He lost the back-and-forth bout via submission in the second round. Even though he lost the fight, he was awarded a Fight of the Night bonus award.

Stewart faced Eric Spicely on 27 May 2018 at UFC Fight Night 130. He won the fight via technical knock out in the second round. The win earned him his first Performance of the Night award.

Stewart faced Charles Byrd on 8 September 2018 at UFC 228. He won the fight via technical knockout.

Stewart faced promotional newcomer Edmen Shahbazyan on 30 November 2018 at The Ultimate Fighter 28 Finale. He lost the fight via split decision.

Stewart faced Bevon Lewis on 8 June 2019 at UFC 238. He won the fight by unanimous decision.

Stewart faced Deron Winn on 18 October 2019 at UFC on ESPN 6. At the weigh-in, Winn weighed in at 188.5 pounds, 2.5 pounds over the middleweight non-title fight limit of 186. The bout was held at catchweight and winn was fined 20% of his purse which went to their opponents Stewart. He won the fight via split decision.

Stewart was scheduled to face Marvin Vettori on 21 March 2020 at UFC Fight Night: Woodley vs. Edwards. Due to the COVID-19 pandemic, the UFC bout was moved to Cage Warriors 113 main event in which he faced Bartosz Fabiński instead. Stewart lost the fight via unanimous decision.

Stewart faced Maki Pitolo on 8 August 2020 at UFC Fight Night 174. He won the fight via a guillotine choke in round one. This win earned him the Performance of the Night award.

Stewart faced Kevin Holland on 19 September 2020 at UFC Fight Night 178. He lost the fight via split decision.

Stewart faced Eryk Anders on 13 March 2021 at UFC Fight Night 187. Due to an illegal knee thrown by Anders in round one, the fight was declared a no contest.

Stewart rematched Eryk Anders on 12 June 2021 at UFC 263. He lost the fight via unanimous decision.

Stewart faced Dustin Jacoby on 28 August 2021 at UFC on ESPN 30. He lost the fight via TKO in round one.

On 31 August 2021, it was announced that Stewart was released by UFC.

=== Return to Cage Warriors ===
Stewart faced Mick Stanton at Cage Warriors 141 on 22 July 2022. He lost the bout via unanimous decision.

Stewart faced Guilherme Cadena on 31 December 2022 at Cage Warriors 148, winning the bout via TKO stoppage in the first round due to elbows and punches on the ground.

Stewart returned to Cage Warriors on 6 May 2023 at Cage Warriors 154, taking on Leon Aliu and winning the bout via unanimous decision.

Stewart faced Matthew Bonner on 1 July 2023 at Cage Warriors 156, winning the bout via unanimous decision.

Stewart faced Antonio Zovak on 25 November 2023 at Cage Warriors 164, winning the bout via first-round TKO stoppage.

On 30 March 2024, Stewart faced Carlos Pereira in a 195 lb bout at Cage Warriors 169, losing the bout via TKO stoppage in the second round.

On 27 August 2024, Stewart announced his retirement from MMA citing financial difficulties as the primary reason.

== Boxing career ==
On 15 February 2025, Stewart was announced to make his professional boxing debut against Darren Till on the undercard of Misfits 21 – Unfinished Business on 29 March at the Manchester Arena in Manchester, England. However, on 21 March the event was postponed due to the headline fighter KSI falling ill. On 17 April, the bout was rescheduled for 16 May at the Vaillant Live in Derby, becoming the new headliner for Misfits 21 – Blinders & Brawls. Stewart lost to Till via unanimous decision.

== Personal life ==
Stewart's moniker "The Dentist" refers to his opponents, whereby "He (his opponent) is just another patient who's gonna get drilled".

Stewart is an avid dancer and was a student of contemporary dance, ballet and street dance for GCSE. He was also a salsa dancing champion.

Stewart lives in Barking, London with his fiancée Katherine, an Ecuadorian, and his sons Marlon and Tyler.

== Championships and accomplishments ==
=== Mixed martial arts ===
- Ultimate Fighting Championship
  - Fight of the Night (One time) vs. Julian Marquez
  - Performance of the Night (Two times) vs. Eric Spicely and Maki Pitolo
  - UFC.com Awards
    - 2017: Ranked #10 Fight of the Year vs. Julian Marquez
- Killacam Promotions
  - Killacam Promotions Light Heavyweight Champion (One time)
    - One successful title defence

== Mixed martial arts record ==
Professional record breakdown
28 matches	16 wins	10 losses
By knockout	9	2
By submission	1	2
By decision	6	6
No contests	2	

Res.	Record	Opponent	Method	Event	Date	Round	Time	Location	Notes
Loss	16–10 (2)	Carlos Pereira	TKO (punches)	Cage Warriors 169	30 March 2024	2	0:28	London, England	Catchweight (195 lb) bout.
Win	16–9 (2)	Antonio Zovak	TKO (punches)	Cage Warriors 164	25 November 2023	1	1:43	Newcastle, England	Return to Light Heavyweight.
Win	15–9 (2)	Matthew Bonner	Decision (unanimous)	Cage Warriors 156	1 July 2023	3	5:00	Cardiff, Wales	
Win	14–9 (2)	Leon Aliu	Decision (unanimous)	Cage Warriors 154	6 May 2023	3	5:00	Rome, Italy	
Win	13–9 (2)	Guilherme Cadena	TKO (elbow and punches)	Cage Warriors 148	31 December 2022	1	2:07	London, England	Catchweight (195 lb) bout.
Loss	12–9 (2)	Mick Stanton	Decision (unanimous)	Cage Warriors 141	22 July 2022	3	5:00	London, England	Return to Middleweight.
Loss	12–8 (2)	Dustin Jacoby	TKO (punches)	UFC on ESPN: Barboza vs. Chikadze	28 August 2021	1	3:04	Las Vegas, Nevada, United States	
Loss	12–7 (2)	Eryk Anders	Decision (unanimous)	UFC 263	12 June 2021	3	5:00	Glendale, Arizona, United States	Return to Light Heavyweight.
NC	12–6 (2)	Eryk Anders	NC (illegal knee)	UFC Fight Night: Edwards vs. Muhammad	13 March 2021	1	4:37	Las Vegas, Nevada, United States	Anders landed an illegal knee to Stewart's head, who was a downed opponent.
Loss	12–6 (1)	Kevin Holland	Decision (split)	UFC Fight Night: Covington vs. Woodley	19 September 2020	3	5:00	Las Vegas, Nevada, United States	
Win	12–5 (1)	Maki Pitolo	Submission (guillotine choke)	UFC Fight Night: Lewis vs. Oleinik	8 August 2020	1	3:41	Las Vegas, Nevada, United States	Performance of the Night.
Loss	11–5 (1)	Bartosz Fabiński	Decision (unanimous)	Cage Warriors 113	20 March 2020	3	5:00	Manchester, England	
Win	11–4 (1)	Deron Winn	Decision (split)	UFC on ESPN: Reyes vs. Weidman	18 October 2019	3	5:00	Boston, Massachusetts, United States	Catchweight (188.5 lb) bout; Winn missed weight.
Win	10–4 (1)	Bevon Lewis	Decision (unanimous)	UFC 238	8 June 2019	3	5:00	Chicago, Illinois, United States	
Loss	9–4 (1)	Edmen Shahbazyan	Decision (split)	The Ultimate Fighter: Heavy Hitters Finale	30 November 2018	3	5:00	Las Vegas, Nevada, United States	
Win	9–3 (1)	Charles Byrd	TKO (punches and elbows)	UFC 228	8 September 2018	2	2:17	Dallas, Texas, United States	
Win	8–3 (1)	Eric Spicely	TKO (punches)	UFC Fight Night: Thompson vs. Till	27 May 2018	2	1:47	Liverpool, England	Performance of the Night.
Loss	7–3 (1)	Julian Marquez	Submission (guillotine choke)	UFC on Fox: Lawler vs. dos Anjos	16 December 2017	2	2:42	Winnipeg, Manitoba, Canada	Fight of the Night.
Loss	7–2 (1)	Karl Roberson	Submission (rear-naked choke)	UFC Fight Night: Poirier vs. Pettis	11 November 2017	1	3:41	Norfolk, Virginia, United States	Middleweight debut.
Loss	7–1 (1)	Francimar Barroso	Decision (unanimous)	UFC Fight Night: Manuwa vs. Anderson	18 March 2017	3	5:00	London, England	
NC	7–0 (1)	Francimar Barroso	NC (overturned)	UFC Fight Night: Bader vs. Nogueira 2	19 November 2016	1	1:34	São Paulo, Brazil	Originally a TKO (punches) win for Stewart; overturned by CABMMA due to an inadvertent headbutt.
Win	7–0	Boubacar Balde	TKO (punches)	Cage Warriors 77	8 July 2016	3	1:28	London, England	
Win	6–0	James Hurrell	TKO (punches)	Cage Warriors 75	15 April 2016	1	0:37	London, England	
Win	5–0	Grégory Pierre	Decision (unanimous)	Killacam Fight Night 9	12 December 2015	3	5:00	Kent, England	Defended the Killacam Light Heavyweight Championship.
Win	4–0	Carl Kinslow	KO (knee)	Killacam Fight Night 8	4 July 2015	1	4:56	Kent, England	Won the Killacam Light Heavyweight Championship.
Win	3–0	Lloyd Clarkson	Decision (unanimous)	Warrior Fight Series 3	23 May 2015	3	5:00	London, England	
Win	2–0	Pelu Adetola	TKO (knees)	Cage Warriors 74	15 November 2014	1	2:24	London, England	
Win	1–0	Michael Revenscroft	TKO (elbows)	Cage Warriors 69	7 June 2014	1	1:23	London, England	

== MF–Professional boxing record ==
1 fight	0 wins	1 loss
By decision	0	1

No.	Result	Record	Opponent	Type	Round, time	Date	Location	Notes
1	Loss	0–1	Darren Till	UD	8	16 May 2025	Vaillant Live, Derby, England	

== See also ==
- List of male mixed martial artists
- List of mixed martial artists with professional boxing records
