= UFC 258 =

UFC mixed martial arts event in 2021

UFC 258: Usman vs. Burns
- The poster for UFC 258: Usman vs. Burns
- Promotion: Ultimate Fighting Championship
- Date: February 13, 2021
- Venue: UFC Apex
- City: Enterprise, Nevada, United States
- Attendance: None (behind closed doors)

Event chronology
UFC Fight Night: Overeem vs. Volkov	UFC 258: Usman vs. Burns	UFC Fight Night: Blaydes vs. Lewis

UFC 258: Usman vs. Burns was a mixed martial arts event produced by the Ultimate Fighting Championship that took place on February 13, 2021, at the UFC Apex facility in Enterprise, Nevada, part of the Las Vegas Metropolitan Area, United States.

== Background ==
A UFC Welterweight Championship bout between the current champion Kamaru Usman (also The Ultimate Fighter: American Top Team vs. Blackzilians welterweight winner) and Gilbert Burns served as the event headliner. The duo was previously scheduled to meet in July 2020 at UFC 251. However, it was announced on July 3 that Burns was pulled from the contest after he and his coach, Greg Jones, tested positive for COVID-19. They were also briefly targeted to headline UFC 256, but Usman pulled out citing more time needed to recover from undisclosed injuries.

A middleweight bout between former interim UFC Middleweight Championship challenger Kelvin Gastelum (also The Ultimate Fighter: Team Jones vs. Team Sonnen middleweight winner) and Ian Heinisch was originally expected to take place at a planned event on January 30. However, the UFC opted against holding a Fight Night on that date and rescheduled the contest to this card.

A middleweight bout between five-time Brazilian jiu-jitsu World Champion Rodolfo Vieira and Anthony Hernandez was expected to take place at UFC Fight Night: Holloway vs. Kattar. However, Hernandez pulled out due to a positive COVID-19 test and they were rescheduled for this event.

A bantamweight rematch featuring Pedro Munhoz and Jimmie Rivera was also expected to take place at the planned January 30 date. They previously met at UFC Fight Night: Belfort vs. Henderson 3 in November 2015, when Rivera won via split decision. The pairing was then rescheduled for UFC on ESPN: Chiesa vs. Magny, before being moved once again, as they were booked to this event due to undisclosed reasons. During the week leading up to the event, the bout was delayed again due to a positive COVID-19 test for someone within the two camps. The pairing remained intact and was rescheduled for two weeks later at UFC Fight Night: Rozenstruik vs. Gane.

A welterweight bout between Dhiego Lima and Belal Muhammad was originally expected to take place in December 2020 at UFC Fight Night: Thompson vs. Neal. However, Muhammad was diagnosed with COVID-19 during the week leading up to the event and the bout was scrapped. The pairing was left intact and took place at this event.

A featherweight bout between Brian Kelleher and Ricky Simón took place at the event. The pairing has been scheduled and cancelled twice before. First, in September 2020 at UFC Fight Night: Overeem vs. Sakai, but Simón's cornerman tested positive for COVID-19 and he was forced to withdraw from the event. The pairing was then rescheduled for UFC on ABC: Holloway vs. Kattar, but this time Kelleher tested positive and was pulled from the bout.

A middleweight rematch between former UFC Middleweight Champion Chris Weidman and Uriah Hall was scheduled to take place at this event. They met previously in September 2010 at a Ring of Combat event for the organization's middleweight title, with Weidman winning via TKO. However, Weidman was pulled from the event in late-January due to a positive COVID-19 test. The pairing remained intact and was rescheduled for UFC 261.

A lightweight bout between Bobby Green and Jim Miller was scheduled for this event. The pairing was previously arranged for UFC 172 in April 2014, but Green pulled out of that bout citing an elbow injury. They were once again cancelled as Green collapsed after the weigh-ins and was deemed unfit to compete.

A women's flyweight bout between Gillian Robertson and Miranda Maverick was scheduled for this event, but it was cancelled on the day of the event after Robertson had a non-COVID related illness.

== Results ==
Main Card
Weight class				Method	Round	Time	Notes
Welterweight	Kamaru Usman (c)	def.	Gilbert Burns	TKO (punches)	3	0:34	(Note: For the UFC Welterweight Championship.)
Women's Flyweight	Alexa Grasso	def.	Maycee Barber	Decision (unanimous) (29–28, 29–28, 29–28)	3	5:00
Middleweight	Kelvin Gastelum	def.	Ian Heinisch	Decision (unanimous) (30–27, 29–28, 29–28)	3	5:00
Featherweight	Ricky Simón	def.	Brian Kelleher	Decision (unanimous) (30–27, 30–27, 30–27)	3	5:00
Middleweight	Julian Marquez	def.	Maki Pitolo	Submission (anaconda choke)	3	4:17
Preliminary card (ESPN / ESPN+)
Middleweight	Anthony Hernandez	def.	Rodolfo Vieira	Submission (guillotine choke)	2	1:53
Welterweight	Belal Muhammad	def.	Dhiego Lima	Decision (unanimous) (30–27, 30–27, 30–27)	3	5:00
Women's Strawweight	Polyana Viana	def.	Mallory Martin	Submission (armbar)	1	3:18
Catchweight (140 lb)	Chris Gutiérrez	def.	Andre Ewell	Decision (unanimous) (30–26, 29–28, 29–27)	3	5:00
Early preliminary card (ESPN+ / UFC Fight Pass)
Welterweight	Gabriel Green	def.	Philip Rowe	Decision (unanimous) (30–27, 29–28, 29–28)	3	5:00

== Bonus awards ==
The following fighters received $50,000 bonuses.

- Fight of the Night: No bonus awarded.
- Performance of the Night: Kamaru Usman, Julian Marquez, Anthony Hernandez and Polyana Viana

== See also ==
- List of UFC events
- List of current UFC fighters
- 2021 in UFC
