= Randy Costa =

American mixed martial arts fighter

- Born: Randy Costa; July 6, 1994 (age 32); Taunton, Massachusetts, U.S.
- Other names: The Zohan
- Height: 5 ft 9 in (1.75 m)
- Weight: 135 lb (61 kg; 9 st 9 lb)
- Division: Bantamweight
- Reach: 73.0 in (185 cm)
- Fighting out of: Taunton, Massachusetts
- Team: Lauzon Mixed Martial Arts; American Top Team (2020–present); Sanford MMA (2020–present)
- Years active: 2018–present

Mixed martial arts record
- Total: 13
- Wins: 8
- By knockout: 8
- Losses: 4
- By knockout: 2
- By submission: 2
- No contests: 1

Other information
- Mixed martial arts record from Sherdog

Randy Costa (born July 6, 1994) is an American professional mixed martial artist who formerly competed in the Bantamweight division. A professional since 2018, he most notably fought in the Ultimate Fighting Championship.

== Background ==
Costa began to box in the sixth grade and then got into kickboxing in the eighth grade. He later wrestled for Taunton High School as a junior in the 160-pound weight class. Adding the element of jiu-jitsu, Costa began training for an MMA career during the summer between his junior and senior years at Taunton High. Costa was a student-athlete at Taunton High. He played football as a freshman, sophomore, and junior. Costa was selected as the Defensive Player of the Game following the Tigers' 35–7 Thanksgiving Day win over Coyle-Cassidy in 2010 at Aleixo Stadium.

== Mixed martial arts career ==
=== Early career ===
Starting his professional career in 2018, Costa fought only for the Cage Titans organization, compiling a perfect 4–0 record with all the wins coming via stoppage in the first round.

=== Ultimate Fighting Championship ===
Costa made his UFC debut against Brandon Davis on April 13, 2019, at UFC 236. He lost the fight via a rear-naked choke submission in the second round.

Costa faced Boston Salmon on October 18, 2019 at UFC on ESPN: Reyes vs. Weidman. He won the fight via TKO in the first round.

Costa faced Journey Newson on September 19, 2020 at UFC Fight Night: Covington vs. Woodley He won the fight via knockout in round one. This win earned him his first Performance of the Night award.

As the first bout of his new four-fight contract, Costa was expected to face Trevin Jones on March 6, 2021 at UFC 259. However, Costa withdrew from the bout in mid-February citing injury and was replaced by Mario Bautista.

Costa faced Adrian Yañez at UFC on ESPN: Sandhagen vs. Dillashaw on July 24, 2021. Despite a strong first round for Costa, he lost the fight by technical knockout in round two.

Costa faced Tony Kelley on December 11, 2021 at UFC 269. He lost the fight via TKO in the second round.

Costa faced Guido Cannetti on October 1, 2022 at UFC Fight Night 211. He was submitted by Cannetti via rear-naked choke in the first round.

On October 20, 2022, it was announced that Costa was no longer on the UFC roster.

=== Gamebred Fighting Championship ===
In his first fight since his release, Costa returned to the featherweight division to face Carlos Espinosa on June 16, 2023, at Combat FC 4. Costa won the bout via first minute TKO.

Costa faced Jason Knight in a bare-knuckle bout on November 10, 2023, at Gamebred FC 6. He won the fight via knockout in the first round.

== Bare-knuckle boxing ==
Costa made his Bare Knuckle Fighting Championship debut against Nick Burgos on June 14, 2025 at BKFC Fight Night 26. He won the fight by knockout at the end of the first round.

== Personal life ==
Costa graduated from Taunton High in the spring of 2012 and then headed to Massasoit Community College in Brockton. He transferred to Bridgewater State University where he majored in political science.

Costa's longtime friend and former training partner, Devin Carrier, died in a car crash in 2016 when Carrier was 21 years old. Costa brings a picture of his friend to weigh-ins.

== Championships and accomplishments ==
=== Mixed martial arts ===
- Ultimate Fighting Championship
  - Performance of the Night (One time) vs. Journey Newson

== Mixed martial arts record ==
Professional record breakdown
13 matches	8 wins	4 losses
By knockout	8	2
By submission	0	2
No contests	1	

Res.	Record	Opponent	Method	Event	Date	Round	Time	Location	Notes
NC	8–4 (1)	Brandon Davis	NC (illegal knee)	Gamebred Bareknuckle MMA 8	November 15, 2024	1	2:47	Biloxi, Mississippi, United States	Bare knuckle MMA. For the inaugural Gamebred FC Bantamweight Championship. Accidental illegal knee rendered Costa unable to continue.
Win	8–4	Jason Knight	TKO (punches)	Gamebred Bareknuckle MMA 6	November 10, 2023	1	1:41	Biloxi, Mississippi, United States	Bare knuckle MMA.
Win	7–4	Carlos Espinosa	TKO (body punches)	Combat FC 4	June 16, 2023	1	0:58	Wilmington, Massachusetts, United States	Return to Featherweight.
Loss	6–4	Guido Cannetti	Submission (rear-naked choke)	UFC Fight Night: Dern vs. Yan	October 1, 2022	1	1:04	Las Vegas, Nevada, United States	
Loss	6–3	Tony Kelley	TKO (elbows)	UFC 269	December 11, 2021	2	4:15	Las Vegas, Nevada, United States	
Loss	6–2	Adrian Yañez	TKO (punches)	UFC on ESPN: Sandhagen vs. Dillashaw	July 24, 2021	2	2:11	Las Vegas, Nevada, United States	
Win	6–1	Journey Newson	KO (head kick)	UFC Fight Night: Covington vs. Woodley	September 19, 2020	1	0:41	Las Vegas, Nevada, United States	Performance of the Night.
Win	5–1	Boston Salmon	TKO (punches)	UFC on ESPN: Reyes vs. Weidman	October 18, 2019	1	2:15	Boston, Massachusetts, United States	
Loss	4–1	Brandon Davis	Submission (rear-naked choke)	UFC 236	April 13, 2019	2	1:12	Atlanta, Georgia, United States	
Win	4–0	Rob Fuller	TKO (punches)	Cage Titans 42	January 26, 2019	1	0:42	Plymouth, Massachusetts, United States	Featherweight bout.
Win	3–0	Chris Thorne	KO (punches to the body)	Cage Titans 41	November 3, 2018	1	1:11	Plymouth, Massachusetts, United States	
Win	2–0	Kenny Lewis	KO (head kick)	Cage Titans 40	August 18, 2018	1	0:11	Plymouth, Massachusetts, United States	Bantamweight debut.
Win	1–0	Stacey Anderson	TKO	Cage Titans 39	June 30, 2018	1	0:46	Kingston, Massachusetts, United States	Featherweight debut.

== Bare-knuckle boxing record ==
Professional record breakdown
1 match	1 win	0 losses
By knockout	1	0
By decision	0	0

Res.	Record	Opponent	Method	Event	Date	Round	Time	Location	Notes
Win	1–0	Nick Burgos	KO	BKFC Fight Night Mohegan Sun: Porter vs. Cleckler	June 14, 2025	1	1:59	Uncasville, Connecticut, United States	
