= Julian Marquez =

American mixed martial artist (born 1990)

- Born: Julian Marquez; May 8, 1990 (age 36); Kansas City, Missouri, U.S.
- Other names: The Cuban Missile Crisis
- Height: 6 ft 2 in (1.88 m)
- Weight: 185 lb (84 kg; 13 st 3 lb)
- Division: Middleweight (2014–present); Light Heavyweight (2016)
- Reach: 72 in (183 cm)
- Stance: Orthodox
- Fighting out of: Kansas City, Missouri
- Team: Glory MMA & Fitness (until 2014, 2020–2022); Syndicate MMA (2014–2020); Factory X (2022–present)
- Rank: Purple belt in Brazilian Jiu-Jitsu under James Krause
- Years active: 2014–present

Mixed martial arts record
- Total: 15
- Wins: 9
- By knockout: 6
- By submission: 3
- Losses: 6
- By knockout: 4
- By decision: 2

Amateur record
- Total: 3
- Wins: 3

Other information
- Mixed martial arts record from Sherdog

Julian Marquez (born May 8, 1990) is an American professional mixed martial artist who competed in the Middleweight division of the Ultimate Fighting Championship.

== Background ==
Marquez was born and raised in Kansas City, Missouri, and has a brother, Antonio. He played violin and sang in a choir prior to moving to Kearney, Missouri with his mother. It was in the middle school in Kearney, where the troubled Marquez was put in wrestling at his father's behest to learn discipline. Marquez continued wrestling during his attendance in Missouri Valley College before starting mixed martial arts training at the age of 20.

== Mixed martial arts career ==
=== Early career ===
Julian Marquez began his professional mixed martial arts career in may of 2014, defeating his opponent Charles Rooks by TKO in just 53 seconds. More than one year later he compiled his second career win. On the 26th February 2016 Marquez suffered his first loss at Bellator 150. After three rounds his opponent Chris Harris was given the unanimous decision win. Julian Marquez went on to win his next three fights in a row including a win over UFC veteran Matt Hamill before debuting in the UFC.

=== Ultimate Fighting Championship ===
Julian Marquez participated in Dana White's Contender Series 4 on the August 1, 2017 against Phil Hawes. He won the fight by Knockout after landing a head kick in the second round.

A middleweight bout against Vitor Miranda was expected to take place on December 16, 2017, at UFC on Fox: Lawler vs. dos Anjos However, on December 4, it was announced that Miranda was pulled from the fight, citing injury and was replaced by Darren Stewart. He won the Fight by Submission via guillotine choke in the second round. He was awarded a Fight of the Night bonus award.

Julian Marquez faced Alessio Di Chirico on July 6, 2018, at The Ultimate Fighter 27 Finale. At the weigh-ins, Julian Marquez weighed in at 190 lbs, four pounds over the middleweight limit of 186. He was fined 30% of his fight purse to Di Chirico and the bout proceeded at a catchweight. He lost the fight via split decision. 14 of 17 media members scored the fight for Marquez.

During his bout with Alessio, Julian suffered a fully torn latissimus dorsi, a rare injury, especially to the extent Julian had sustained. This injury led to Julian having to get two separate surgeries and leading him to miss almost two full years.

Marquez was scheduled to face Saparbek Safarov on August 29, 2020, at UFC Fight Night 175. However, the bout was moved to UFC Fight Night 183 in November after Safarov faced travel restrictions related to the COVID-19 pandemic. In turn, Safarov pulled out due to weight cut issues a day before the event and the pairing was canceled once again.

Marquez faced Maki Pitolo on February 13, 2021, at UFC 258. He secured a comeback win via third round anaconda choke. This win earned him a Performance of the Night award. On that same event, he asked popstar Miley Cyrus to be his valentine to which she agreed if he shaved "MC" (Miley's initials) on his chest.

Marquez faced Sam Alvey on April 10, 2021, at UFC on ABC 2. He won the bout via second round rear-naked choke. This win earned him a Fight of the Night award.

Marquez was scheduled to face Jordan Wright on October 16, 2021, at UFC Fight Night 195. At the weigh-ins, Marquez was pulled from his middleweight bout against Wright due to "non-COVID health issues." He never made it to the scale, even though his opponent weighed in within the middleweight non-title fight limit. As a result, the bout was cancelled.

Marquez was scheduled to face Kyle Daukaus on February 19, 2022, at UFC Fight Night 201. However, Marquez was pulled from the event for undisclosed reasons, and he was replaced by Jamie Pickett.

Marquez was scheduled to face Wellington Turman on June 18, 2022, at UFC on ESPN 37, However, Turman withdrew due to an orbital bone injury and was replaced by Gregory Rodrigues. He lost the bout in the first round after getting knocked out.

As the first bout of his new four-fight contract, Marquez was scheduled to face Deron Winn on December 17, 2022, at UFC Fight Night 216. However, just two days before the event, Winn was forced to withdraw after fainting and falling down a set of stairs, sustaining a minor concussion and the bout was scrapped.

Marquez faced Marc-André Barriault March 4, 2023, at UFC 285. He lost the fight via technical knockout in the second round.

Marquez faced face Zachary Reese on June 8, 2024, at UFC on ESPN 57. He lost the fight by knockout twenty seconds into the first round.

Replacing Ryan Loder, who withdrew for unknown reasons, Marquez faced Cody Brundage on March 1, 2025 at UFC Fight Night 253. He lost the bout by technical knockout at the end of the first round.

On March 5, 2025 after his fourth consecutive UFC knockout loss, it was reported that Marquez was released by the UFC.

== Personal life ==
Marquez is of Cuban descent through his father, who inspired his nickname. He has a podcast, “Beauty and the Beast”, with pornographic actress Kendra Lust.

== Championships and accomplishments ==
=== Mixed martial arts ===
- Ultimate Fighting Championship
  - Fight of the Night (Two times) vs. Darren Stewart and Sam Alvey
  - Performance of the Night (One time) vs. Maki Pitolo
  - UFC Honors Awards
    - 2021: Fan's Choice Comeback of the Year Nominee vs. Maki Pitolo
  - UFC.com Awards
    - 2017: Ranked #10 Fight of the Year vs. Darren Stewart
    - 2021: Ranked #10 Submission of the Year vs. Maki Pitolo

== Mixed martial arts record ==
Professional record breakdown
15 matches	9 wins	6 losses
By knockout	6	4
By submission	3	0
By decision	0	2

Res.	Record	Opponent	Method	Event	Date	Round	Time	Location	Notes
Loss	9–6	Cody Brundage	TKO (punches)	UFC Fight Night: Kape vs. Almabayev	March 1, 2025	1	4:45	Las Vegas, Nevada, United States	
Loss	9–5	Zachary Reese	TKO (body kick and punches)	UFC on ESPN: Cannonier vs. Imavov	June 8, 2024	1	0:20	Louisville, Kentucky, United States	
Loss	9–4	Marc-André Barriault	TKO (punches)	UFC 285	March 4, 2023	2	4:12	Las Vegas, Nevada, United States	
Loss	9–3	Gregory Rodrigues	KO (punches)	UFC on ESPN: Kattar vs. Emmett	June 18, 2022	1	3:18	Austin, Texas, United States	
Win	9–2	Sam Alvey	Technical Submission (rear-naked choke)	UFC on ABC: Vettori vs. Holland	April 10, 2021	2	2:07	Las Vegas, Nevada, United States	Fight of the Night.
Win	8–2	Maki Pitolo	Submission (anaconda choke)	UFC 258	February 13, 2021	3	4:17	Las Vegas, Nevada, United States	Performance of the Night.
Loss	7–2	Alessio Di Chirico	Decision (split)	The Ultimate Fighter: Undefeated Finale	July 6, 2018	3	5:00	Las Vegas, Nevada, United States	Catchweight (190 lb) bout; Marquez missed weight.
Win	7–1	Darren Stewart	Submission (guillotine choke)	UFC on Fox: Lawler vs. dos Anjos	December 16, 2017	2	2:42	Winnipeg, Manitoba, Canada	Fight of the Night.
Win	6–1	Phil Hawes	KO (head kick)	Dana White's Contender Series 4	August 1, 2017	2	2:20	Las Vegas, Nevada, United States	Return to Middleweight.
Win	5–1	Cameron Olson	KO (punch)	LFA 12	May 19, 2017	1	1:06	Prior Lake, Minnesota, United States	
Win	4–1	Matt Hamill	TKO (punches)	Combate Americas: Empire Rising	October 14, 2016	1	1:22	Verona, New York, United States	Light Heavyweight debut.
Win	3–1	Idrees Wasi	TKO (punches)	Combate Americas: Road to the Championship 5	May 9, 2016	2	2:05	Los Angeles, California, United States	
Loss	2–1	Chris Harris	Decision (unanimous)	Bellator 150	February 26, 2016	3	5:00	Mulvane, Kansas, United States	
Win	2–0	Jesse Jones	TKO (punches)	Kansas City Fighting Alliance 14	April 25, 2015	1	2:29	Independence, Missouri, United States	
Win	1–0	Charles Rooks	TKO (punches)	Blackout FC 22	May 24, 2014	1	0:53	Kansas City, Missouri, United States	Middleweight debut.

== See also ==
- List of Dana White's Contender Series alumni
- List of male mixed martial artists
