= List of Invicta FC events =

List of Invicta Fighting Championship events

This is a list of events that Invicta Fighting Championships have held since their inaugural event, Invicta FC 1: Coenen vs. Ruyssen. The promotion has held 66 events as of April 2025.

== Invicta FC 62: Lehner vs. Rubin ==
Invicta FC 62: Lehner vs. Rubin
- Date: May 16, 2025
- Venue: The LEX at Municipal Auditorium
- City: Kansas City, Missouri

Event chronology
Invicta FC 61: Ferreira vs. Palacios	Invicta FC 62: Lehner vs. Rubin

Invicta FC 62: Lehner vs. Rubin was a mixed martial arts event headlined by Olga Rubin vs. Katharina Lehner. A fight between Ashley Yoder and Abril Anguiano was scheduled, but Anguiano pulled out on the week of the event and the fight was cancelled.

=== Results ===
Main Card (CBS Sports Network)
Weight class				Method	Round	Time	Notes
Bantamweight	Olga Rubin	def.	Katharina Lehner	Submission (rear-naked choke)	2	1:14	(Note: Lehner missed weight (137 lb))
Flyweight	Rayla Nascimento	def.	DeAnna Bennett	Decision (unanimous) (30–27, 30–27, 30–27)	3	5:00	(Note: Bennett missed weight (126.8 lb).)
Flyweight	Milana Dudieva	def.	Amanda Torres	Decision (unanimous) (30–27, 30–27, 29–28)	3	5:00
Flyweight	Ashley Barret	def.	Quinn Williams	TKO (elbows and punches)	3	1:40
Preliminary Card (YouTube)
Flyweight	Charlsey Maner	def.	Alex Lawal	Decision (unanimous) (29-28, 29-28, 29-28)	3	5:00

== Invicta FC 61: Ferreira vs. Palacios ==
Invicta FC 61: Ferreira vs. Palacios
- Date: April 4, 2025
- Venue: Grand Casino Hotel & Resort
- City: Shawnee, Oklahoma

Event chronology
Invicta FC 60: Rubin vs. Cantuária	Invicta FC 61: Ferreira vs. Palacios	Invicta FC 62: Rubin vs. Lehner

Invicta FC 61: Ferreira vs. Palacios was a mixed martial arts event headlined by Elisandra Ferreira defending her atomweight championship against Ana Palacios. Emily Ducote was scheduled to fight Sofia Bagishvili, but Sofia pulled out and was replaced by Thaiane Souza on nine days notice.

=== Results ===
Main Card (CBS Sports Network)
Weight class				Method	Round	Time	Notes
Atomweight	Elisandra Ferreira (c)	def.	Ana Palacios	Decision (unanimous) (49–46, 49–46, 50–45)	5	5:00	(Note: For the Invicta FC Atomweight Championship.)
Featherweight	Jamie Edenden	def.	Jackie Cataline	KO (punch)	2	1:53
Catchweight (120 lb)	Emily Ducote	def.	Thaiane Souza	KO (punch)	1	2:29	(Note: Souza missed weight (124.3 lb).)
Featherweight	Jaeleen Robledo	def.	Riley Martinez	TKO (elbows and punches)	2	2:17
Preliminary Card (YouTube)
Atomweight	Taynara Silva	def.	Claire Lopez	Submission (brabo choke)	1	3:17
Featherweight	Joy Pendell	def.	Marilia Morais	Submission (arm-triangle choke)	1	2:28
Flyweight	Zoe Nowicki	def.	Kellie Marin	Submission (keylock)	1	1:42

== Invicta FC 60: Rubin vs. Cantuária ==
Invicta FC 60: Rubin vs. Cantuária
- Date: February 7, 2025
- Venue: Center Stage
- City: Atlanta, Georgia

Event chronology
Invicta FC 59: Bernardo vs. Maia	Invicta FC 60: Rubin vs. Cantuária	Invicta FC 61: Ferreira vs. Palacios

Invicta FC 60: Rubin vs. Cantuária was a mixed martial arts event headlined by a fight between former title challengers Olga Rubin and Mayra Cantuária. Joy Pendell was scheduled to fight Krissa Timbs, but Timbs pulled out a week before the event and was replaced by Julia Dorny, who took the fight on 8 days notice. A fight between Jackie Cataline and Jamie Edenden was the planned co-main event, however Cataline was medically suspended after competing in Power Slap, causing the fight to be postponed.

=== Results ===
Main Card (CBS Sports Network)
Weight class				Method	Round	Time	Notes
Bantamweight	Mayra Cantuária	def.	Olga Rubin	Decision (unanimous) (30-27, 29-28, 29-28)	3	5:00
Bantamweight	Katharina Lehner	def.	Shanna Young	Decision (split) (30-27, 28-29, 29-28)	3	5:00
Flyweight	Rayla Nascimento	def.	Victoria Leonardo	Decision (unanimous) (30-27, 30-27, 30-27)	3	5:00
Strawweight	Liana Ferreira Pirosin	def.	Shino VanHoose	Decision (unanimous) (30-27, 30-27, 29-28)	3	5:00
Preliminary card (YouTube)
Atomweight	Giulliany Perêa Vieira	def.	Hope Holmes	Decision (unanimous) (30-27, 30-27, 30-27)	3	5:00
Featherweight	Joy Pendell	def.	Julia Dorny	Submission (rear-naked choke)	2	4:46
Strawweight	Amber Medina	def.	Anna Somers	TKO (punches)	2	4:00

== Invicta FC 59: Bernardo vs. Maia ==
Invicta FC 59: Bernardo vs. Maia
- Date: December 13, 2024
- Venue: The Eastern
- City: Atlanta, Georgia

Event chronology
Invicta FC 58: Ducote vs. Ostroverkhova	Invicta FC 59: Bernardo vs. Maia	Invicta FC 60: Rubin vs. Cantuária

Invicta FC 59: Bernardo vs. Maia was a mixed martial event headlined by Talita Bernardo defending her bantamweight championship against former champion Jennifer Maia. A fight between Giulliany Perêa and Natalie Salcedo was cancelled the week of the event after Salcedo was not medically cleared to compete. During the event, the planned featherweight co-main event of Riley Martinez vs. Jackie Cataline was cancelled.

=== Results ===
Main Card (CBS Sports Network)
Weight class				Method	Round	Time	Notes
Bantamweight	Jennifer Maia	def.	Talita Bernardo (c)	Decision (unanimous) (49-46, 49-46, 49-46)	5	5:00	(Note: For the Invicta FC Bantamweight Championship.)
Catchweight (132.2 lbs)	Paula Cristina	def.	Alejandra Lara	Decision (split) (29-28, 28-29, 29-28)	3	5:00
Strawweight	Valesca Machado	def.	Yasmin Castanho	Decision (unanimous) (30-27, 30-27, 30-27)	3	5:00
Atomweight	Ana Palacios	def.	Monique Adriane	Decision (unanimous) (29-28, 29-28, 29-28)	3	5:00
Preliminary card (YouTube)
Strawweight	Fernanda Orellana	def.	Ashley Barrett	Submission (rear-naked choke)	3	4:24

== Invicta FC 58: Ducote vs. Ostroverkhova ==
Invicta FC 58: Ducote vs. Ostroverkhova
- Date: November 6, 2024
- Venue: Memorial Hall
- City: Kansas City, Kansas

Event chronology
Invicta FC 57: Ferreira vs. Romero	Invicta FC 58: Ducote vs. Ostroverkhova	Invicta FC 59: Bernardo vs. Maia

Invicta FC 58: Ducote vs. Ostroverkhova was a mixed martial arts event headlined by former Invicta Strawweight Champion Emily Ducote vs. Yulia Ostroverkhova. The event was originally scheduled to be headlined by Alejandra Lara vs. Viviane "Sucuri" Pereira but that fight was cancelled due to illness. DeAnna Bennett was scheduled to fight Kate Bacik in the co-main event, but Bacik was replaced by Thaiane Souza a week before the event, in turn the bout was cancelled when Souza weighed in at 132 pounds. Shanna Young vs. Amanda Torres was originally on the card but Torres was moved to fight the returning Victoria Leonardo, while Young was instead matched up with Pámela Bóveda. A fight between Saori Oshima and Ana Palacios was cancelled due to injury.

=== Results ===
Main Card (CBS Sports Network)
Weight class				Method	Round	Time	Notes
Strawweight	Emily Ducote	def.	Yulia Ostroverkhova	Submission (armbar)	2	3:53
Flyweight	Victoria Leonardo	def.	Amanda Torres	Submission (armbar)	3	1:36
Bantamweight	Shanna Young	def.	Pámela Bóveda Aguirre	TKO (knees to the body and punches)	1	0:23
Featherweight	Zurina Turrey	def.	Joy Pendell	Decision (unanimous) (30–27, 30–27, 29–28)	3	5:00
Strawweight	Sayury Canon	def.	Abril Anguiano	Decision (split) (30–27, 28–29, 29–28)	3	5:00	(Note: Anguiano missed weight (117.8 lb).)
Preliminary Card (YouTube)
Flyweight	Zoe Nowicki	def.	Barbara Grabowska	Decision (unanimous) (29–28, 29–28, 30–27)	3	5:00
Atomweight	Magdalena Czaban	def.	Hope Holmes	Submission (guillotine choke)	2	2:42

== Invicta FC 57: Ferreira vs. Romero ==
Invicta FC 57: Ferreira vs. Romero
- Date: September 20, 2024
- Venue: Memorial Hall
- City: Kansas City, Kansas

Event chronology
Invicta FC 56: Maia vs. Cantuária	Invicta FC 57: Ferreira vs. Romero	Invicta FC 58: Ducote vs. Ostroverkhova

Invicta FC 57: Ferreira vs. Romero was a mixed martial event headlined by Elisandra Ferreira vs. Andressa Romero for the vacant Invicta FC Atomweight Championship. A bout between Violeta Mendoza and Meghan Penning was announced, but Mendoza was replaced by Fernanda Orellana. DeAnna Bennett vs. Liz Tracy was featured on the event as the 500th bout in Invicta's history.

=== Results ===
Main Card (CBS Sports Network)
Weight class				Method	Round	Time	Notes
Atomweight	Elisandra Ferreira	def.	Andressa Romero	Decision (unanimous) (48-47, 48-47, 49-46)	5	5:00	(Note: For the vacant Invicta FC Atomweight Championship.)
Flyweight	Kristina Williams	def.	Nayara Maia	TKO (knee injury)	1	0:31
Flyweight	DeAnna Bennett	def.	Liz Tracy	Decision (unanimous) (30-27, 30-27, 29-28)	3	5:00
Flyweight	Milana Dudieva	def.	Sandra Lavado	Decision (unanimous) (29-28, 29-28, 29-28)	3	5:00
Preliminary card (YouTube)
Featherweight	Jamie Edenden	def.	Abigail Montes	Decision (unanimous) (29-28, 29-28, 30-27)	3	5:00
Bantamweight	Maria Djukic	def.	Maria Favela	TKO (punch)	1	0:57
Strawweight	Fernanda Orellana	def.	Meaghan Penning	Decision (unanimous) (30-27, 30-27, 30-27)	3	5:00
Strawweight	Quinn Williams	def.	Ana Vitoria	Decision (unanimous) (30-27, 30-27, 30-27)	3	5:00

== Invicta FC 56: Maia vs. Cantuária ==
Invicta FC 56: Maia vs. Cantuária
- Date: August 9, 2024
- Venue: Stockyards Event Center
- City: Denver, Colorado

Event chronology
Invicta FC 55: Bernardo vs. Rubin	Invicta FC 56: Maia vs. Cantuária	Invicta FC 57: Ferreira vs. Romero

Invicta FC 56: Maia vs. Cantuária was a mixed martial events headlined by Jennifer Maia returning to Invicta to face Mayra Cantuária. Kelly Ottoni was scheduled to fight Riley Martinez but Martinez was replaced by Jackie Cataline. Ashley Barrett was scheduled to fight Amber Medina, but Medina was replaced by Tatiana Salazar on the weekend before the event.

=== Results ===
Main Card (CBS Sports Network)
Weight class				Method	Round	Time	Notes
Bantamweight	Jennifer Maia	def.	Mayra Cantuária	Decision (unanimous) (29-28, 29-28, 29-28)	3	5:00
Strawweight	Valesca Machado	def.	Yulia Ostroverkhova	Decision (unanimous) (30-27, 30-27, 30-27)	3	5:00
Featherweight	Jackie Cataline	def.	Kelly Ottoni	TKO (punches)	3	3:15
Bantamweight	Kate Bacik	def.	Paula Bittencourt	Decision (split) (29-28, 28-29, 29-28)	3	5:00
Atomweight	Ana Palacios	def.	Flor Hernandez	Decision (unanimous) (30-27, 30-27, 30-27)	3	5:00
Preliminary card (YouTube)
Atomweight	Giulliany Perêa	def.	Ailed Zubieta	Decision (unanimous) (30-27, 30-27, 30-27)	3	5:00
Featherweight	Ali Pellegrini	def.	Marissa Ellis	Submission (rear-naked choke)	3	1:14
Flyweight	Ashley Barrett	def.	Tatiana Salazar	TKO (punches)	1	1:34

== Invicta FC 55: Bernardo vs. Rubin ==
Invicta FC 55: Bernardo vs. Rubin
- Date: June 28, 2024
- Venue: Memorial Hall
- City: Kansas City, Kansas

Event chronology
Invicta FC 54: McCormack vs. Wójcik	Invicta FC 55: Bernardo vs. Rubin	Invicta FC 56: Maia vs. Cantuária

Invicta FC 55: Bernardo vs. Rubin was a mixed martial arts event headlined by Talita Bernardo defending her bantamweight championship against Olga Rubin. This was the first Invicta FC event to air on CBS Sports Network.

=== Results ===
Main Card (CBS Sports Network)
Weight class				Method	Round	Time	Notes
Bantamweight	Talita Bernardo (c)	def.	Olga Rubin	Submission (rear-naked choke)	2	2:53	(Note: For the Invicta FC Bantamweight Championship.)
Strawweight	Kay Hansen	def.	Sayury Cañon	Decision (split) (28-29, 29-28, 29-28)	3	5:00
Atomweight	Andressa Romero	def.	Saori Oshima	Decision (unanimous) (30-27, 29-28, 29-28)	3	5:00
Catchweight (137.4 lbs)	Taylor Guardado	def.	Yoko Higashi	Submission (rear-naked choke)	1	1:23
Preliminary card (YouTube)
Atomweight	Elisandra Ferreira	def.	Katie Saull	Decision (unanimous) (30-27, 29-28, 29-28)	3	5:00
Flyweight	Zoe Nowicki	def.	Josiane Oliveira	Decision (unanimous) (30-27, 30-27, 29-28)	3	5:00
Flyweight	Violeta Mendoza	def.	Fallon Johnson	TKO (punches)	1	4:16

== Invicta FC 54: McCormack vs. Wójcik ==
Invicta FC 54: McCormack vs. Wójcik
- Date: October 27, 2023
- Venue: House of Blues
- City: Boston, Massachusetts

Event chronology
Invicta FC 53: DeCoursey vs. Dos Santos	Invicta FC 54: McCormack vs. Wójcik	Invicta FC 55: Bernardo vs. Rubin

Invicta FC 54: McCormack vs. Wójcik was a mixed martial arts event headlined by Danni McCormack defending her strawweight championship against Karolina Wójcik. Valesca Machado was scheduled to fight Isis Verbeek, but Verbeek was replaced 2 weeks before the event by Kalindra Faria. On the night of the event, the fight between Machado and Faria was cancelled.

=== Results ===
Main Card
Weight class				Method	Round	Time	Notes
Strawweight	Danni McCormack (c)	def.	Karolina Wójcik	Technical Submission (rear-naked choke)	4	1:22	(Note: For the Invicta FC Strawweight Championship.)
Flyweight	Kristina Williams	def.	Dee Begley	Decision (split) (28-29, 29-28, 29-28)	3	5:00
Strawweight	Andrea Amara	def.	Hilarie Rose	Submission (rear-naked choke)	1	4:19
Featherweight	Riley Martinez	def.	Julia Dorny	Submission (rear-naked choke)	1	1:48
Bantamweight	Maria Djukic	def.	Fernanda Araujo	Decision (unanimous) (30-27, 29-28, 29-28)	3	5:00

== Invicta FC 53: DeCoursey vs. Dos Santos ==
Invicta FC 53: DeCoursey vs. Dos Santos
- Date: May 3, 2023
- Venue: Reelworks Denver
- City: Denver, Colorado

Event chronology
Invicta FC 52: Machado vs. McCormack	Invicta FC 53: DeCoursey vs. Dos Santos	Invicta FC 54: McCormack vs. Wojcik

Invicta FC 53: DeCoursey vs. Dos Santos was a mixed martial arts event headlined by Jillian DeCoursey defending her atomweight championship against Rayanne dos Santos. A fight between Natalie Salcedo and Dayane Cristine was announced but removed before the event.

=== Results ===
Main Card
Weight class				Method	Round	Time	Notes
Atomweight	Rayanne dos Santos	def.	Jillian DeCoursey (c)	Decision (unanimous) (50-45, 50-45, 48-47)	5	5:00	(Note: For the Invicta FC Atomweight Championship.)
Bantamweight	Olga Rubin	def.	Claire Guthrie	Submission (buggy choke)	2	4:23
Strawweight	Jéssica Delboni	def.	Danielle Taylor	Decision (unanimous) (30-27, 30-27, 29-28)	3	5:00
Atomweight	Monique Adriane	def.	Nicole Gerardo	Decision (unanimous) (30-27, 30-27, 30-27)	3	5:00
Flyweight	Elise Pone	def.	Liana Pirosin	Decision (unanimous) (30-27, 29-28, 29-28)	3	5:00
Atomweight	Elisandra Ferreira	def.	Flor Hernandez	Decision (unanimous) (30-27, 30-27, 30-27)	3	5:00
Flyweight	Ky Bennett	def.	Kendal Holowell	TKO (punches)	2	4:04

== Invicta FC 52: Machado vs. McCormack ==
Invicta FC 52: Machado vs. McCormack
- Date: March 15, 2023
- Venue: Reelworks Denver
- City: Denver, Colorado

Event chronology
Invicta FC 51: Tennant vs. Bernardo	Invicta FC 52: Machado vs. McCormack	Invicta FC 53: DeCoursey vs. Dos Santos

Invicta FC 52: Machado vs. McCormack was a mixed martial arts event headlined by Valesca Machado defending her strawweight championship against Danni McCormack. Montserrat Rendon was scheduled to fight Alexa Conners, but Conners was forced to withdraw and was replaced by Maria Favela. Favela later withdrew from the fight and the bout was removed from the card. Ramona Pascual was scheduled to fight Amber Leibrock but Leibrock withdrew after signing with PFL and was replaced by Kaylee Vos. However, Pascual was then unable to compete and the bout was removed from the card.

=== Results ===
Main Card
Weight class				Method	Round	Time	Notes
Strawweight	Danni McCormack	def.	Valesca Machado (c)	Decision (unanimous) (49-46, 49-46, 48-47)	5	5:00	(Note: For the Invicta FC Strawweight Championship.)
Strawweight	Karolina Wójcik	def.	Ediana Silva	Decision (split) (28-29, 29-28, 29-28)	3	5:00
Strawweight	Shauna Bannon	def.	Minna Grusander	Decision (unanimous) (30-27, 30-27, 30-27)	3	5:00
Bantamweight	Mayra Cantuária	def.	Calie Cutler	Submission (rear-naked choke)	2	2:16
Strawweight	Fatima Kline	def.	Natalia Kuziutina	Decision (unanimous) (30-27, 30-27, 29-28)	3	5:00
Strawweight	Sayury Cañon	def.	Amanda Macioce	Decision (unanimous) (29-28, 29-28, 29-28)	3	5:00
Catchweight (120 lbs)	Kendra McIntyre	def.	Diana Sanchez	Decision (unanimous) (30-27, 30-27, 30-27)	3	5:00

== Invicta FC 51: Tennant vs. Bernardo ==
Invicta FC 51: Tennant vs. Bernardo
- Date: January 18, 2023
- Venue: Reelworks Denver
- City: Denver, Colorado

Event chronology
Invicta FC 50	Invicta FC 51: Tennant vs. Bernardo	Invicta FC 52: Machado vs. McCormack

Invicta FC 51: Tennant vs. Bernardo was a mixed martial arts event headlined by Taneisha Tennant defending her bantamweight championship against Talita Bernardo. The co-main event will see Kristina Williams and Ketlen Souza face off for the vacant flyweight championship. The night before the event, the fight between Tanya Nijjar and Sayury Canon was removed from the card after Nijar missed weight. Serena DeJesus came in at 137.3 pounds, 1.3 pounds over the limit and was fined 25% of her purse which went to Rubin.

=== Results ===
Main Card
Weight class				Method	Round	Time	Notes
Bantamweight	Talita Bernardo	def.	Taneisha Tennant (c)	Decision (unanimous) (48-46, 48-46, 48-46)	5	5:00	(Note: For the Invicta FC Bantamweight Championship.)
Flyweight	Ketlen Souza	def.	Kristina Williams	Decision (unanimous) (50-45, 49-46, 48-47)	5	5:00	(Note: For the vacant Invicta FC Flyweight Championship.)
Catchweight (137.3 lbs)	Olga Rubin	def.	Serena DeJesus	Decision (unanimous) (30-27, 30-27, 30-27)	3	5:00	(Note: DeJesus missed weight (137.3 lbs))
Bantamweight	Claire Guthrie	def.	Auttumn Norton	Decision (unanimous) (30-27, 30-27, 30-27)	3	5:00
Atomweight	Elisandra Ferreira	def.	Marisa Messer-Belenchia	Decision (split) (29-28, 28-29, 29-28)	3	5:00
Atomweight	Rayanne Amanda	def.	Katie Saull	Decision (unanimous) (30-27, 30-27, 29-28)	3	5:00
Strawweight	Fatima Kline	def.	Laura Gallardo	Decision (unanimous) (30-27, 30-27, 30-27)	3	5:00

== Invicta FC 50 ==
Invicta FC 50
- Date: November 16, 2022
- Venue: Reelworks Denver
- City: Denver, Colorado

Event chronology
Invicta FC 49: Delboni vs. DeCoursey	Invicta FC 50	Invicta FC 51: Tennant vs. Bernardo

Invicta FC 50 was a mixed martial arts event that featured a one night tournament to crown the new Invicta FC Strawweight Champion. The tournament included Gloria de Paula, Ediana Silva, Karolina Wójcik, and Valesca Machado. The co-main event featured Talita Bernardo vs. Katharina Lehner in a bout originally scheduled for Invicta FC 48. Danni McCormack was scheduled to fight Fatima Kline but Kline was replaced by Maira Mazar. Claire Guthrie was scheduled to fight Marilla Morais, but Morais was replaced by Brigid Chase. Melissa Oddessa was scheduled to fight Sharon Jacobson, however four days before the event Jacobson was replaced by Elise Pone.

=== Results ===
Main Card
Weight class				Method	Round	Time	Notes
Strawweight	Valesca Machado	def.	Karolina Wójcik	Decision (unanimous) (30-27, 29-28, 29-28)	3	5:00	(Note: Strawweight tournament final bout for the vacant Invicta FC Strawweight Championship.)
Bantamweight	Talita Bernardo	def.	Katharina Lehner	Submission (kimura)	2	4:26
Bantamweight	Claire Guthrie	def.	Brigid Chase	Decision (unanimous) (30-27, 29-28, 29-28)	3	5:00
Strawweight	Danni McCormack	def.	Maíra Mazar	Decision (unanimous) (29-28, 29-28, 29-28)	3	5:00	(Note: Strawweight tournament reserve bout)
Strawweight	Valesca Machado	def.	Ediana Silva	Decision (split) (30-27, 28-29, 29-28)	3	5:00	(Note: Strawweight tournament semifinal bout)
Strawweight	Karolina Wójcik	def.	Gloria de Paula	Decision (unanimous) (29-28, 29-28, 29-28)	3	5:00	(Note: Strawweight tournament semifinal bout)
Strawweight	Elise Pone	def.	Melissa Oddessa	Decision (unanimous) (30-27, 30-27, 30-27)	3	5:00	(Note: Strawweight tournament reserve bout)

== Invicta FC 49: Delboni vs. DeCoursey ==
Invicta FC 49: Delboni vs. DeCoursey
- Date: September 28, 2022
- Venue: Sugar Creek Casino
- City: Hinton, Oklahoma

Event chronology
Invicta FC 48: Tennant vs. Rubin	Invicta FC 49: Delboni vs. DeCoursey	Invicta FC 50

Invicta FC 49: Delboni vs. DeCoursey was a mixed martial arts event headlined by Jéssica Delboni defending her atomweight championship against Jillian DeCoursey. The co-main event was set to feature Kristina Williams vs. Ketlen Souza but Williams was replaced by Maiju Suotama.

=== Results ===
Main Card
Weight class				Method	Round	Time	Notes
Atomweight	Jillian DeCoursey	def.	Jéssica Delboni (c)	Submission (rear-naked choke)	1	4:49	(Note: For the Invicta FC Atomweight Championship.)
Flyweight	Ketlen Souza	def.	Maiju Suotama	Decision (unanimous) (30-27, 30-27, 30-27)	3	5:00
Strawweight	Valesca Machado	def.	Liz Tracy	Decision (unanimous) (30-27, 30-27, 30-27)	3	5:00
Flyweight	Kaytlin Neil	def.	Hannah Guy	Decision (unanimous) (30-25, 30-27, 30-27)	3	5:00
Flyweight	Poliana Botelho	def.	Helen Peralta	Decision (unanimous) (30-27, 30-27, 29-28)	3	5:00
Bantamweight	Montserrat Rendon	def.	Brittney Cloudy	Decision (split) (28-29, 29-28, 29-28)	3	5:00
Strawweight	Shauna Bannon	def.	Nadia Vera	Decision (unanimous) (30-27, 30-27, 29-28)	3	5:00

== Invicta FC 48: Tennant vs. Rubin ==
Invicta FC 48: Tennant vs. Rubin
- Date: July 20, 2022
- Venue: Reelworks Denver
- City: Denver, Colorado

Event chronology
Invicta FC 47: Ducote vs. Zappitella	Invicta FC 48: Tennant vs. Rubin	Invicta FC 49: Delboni vs. DeCoursey

Invicta FC 48: Tennant vs. Rubin was a mixed martial arts event headlined by Taneisha Tennant defending her bantamweight championship against Olga Rubin. The co-main event was set to feature Katharina Lehner fighting Talita Bernardo, but Lehner withdrew from the bout and was replaced by Yana Gadelha. Mallory Martin pulled out of her fight against Kyra Batara and was replaced by Valesca Machado.

=== Results ===
Main Card
Weight class				Method	Round	Time	Notes
Bantamweight	Taneisha Tennant (c)	def.	Olga Rubin	Decision (split) (47-48, 48-47, 50-45)	5	5:00	(Note: For the Invicta FC Bantamweight Championship.)
Bantamweight	Talita Bernardo	def.	Yana Gadelha	Submission (rear-naked choke)	2	1:39
Flyweight	Kristina Williams	def.	Liana Pirosin	Submission (rear-naked choke)	1	3:16
Strawweight	Isis Verbeek	def.	Melissa Oddessa	Decision (unanimous) (29-28, 29-28, 29-28)	3	5:00
Featherweight	Amber Leibrock	def.	Morgan Frier	Submission (rear-naked choke)	1	3:09
Bantamweight	Auttumn Norton	def.	Maria Djukic	TKO (punches)	2	1:02

== Invicta FC 47: Ducote vs. Zappitella ==
Invicta FC 47: Ducote vs. Zappitella
- Date: May 11, 2022
- Venue: Memorial Hall
- City: Kansas City, Kansas

Event chronology
Invicta FC 46: Rodríguez vs. Torquato II	Invicta FC 47: Ducote vs. Zappitella	Invicta FC 48: Tennant vs. Rubin

Invicta FC 47: Ducote vs. Zappitella was a mixed martial arts event headlined by Emily Ducote defending her strawweight championship against former atomweight champion Alesha Zappitella. Serena DeJesus was scheduled to fight Lisa Verzosa, but Verzosa pulled out and was replaced by Brittney Cloudy.

=== Results ===
Main Card
Weight class				Method	Round	Time	Notes
Strawweight	Emily Ducote (c)	def.	Alesha Zappitella	TKO (doctor stoppage)	2	5:00	(Note: For the Invicta FC Strawweight Championship.)
Featherweight	Chelsea Chandler	def.	Courtney King	Decision (unanimous) (29-28, 29-28, 29-28)	3	5:00
Atomweight	Jillian DeCoursey	def.	Lindsey VanZandt	KO (punch)	1	1:01
Flyweight	Liana Pirosin	def.	Janaisa Morandin	Decision (split) (28-29, 29-28, 29-28)	3	5:00
Bantamweight	Serena DeJesus	def.	Brittney Cloudy	Decision (unanimous) (30-27, 29-28, 29-28)	3	5:00
Strawweight	Fatima Kline	def.	Sidney Trillo	TKO (punches)	3	4:45
Strawweight	Alyssa Linduska	def.	Jennifer Chieng	Decision (unanimous) (29-28, 29-28, 29-28)	3	5:00

== Invicta FC 46: Rodríguez vs. Torquato II ==
Invicta FC 46: Rodríguez vs. Torquato II
- Date: March 9, 2022
- Venue: Memorial Hall
- City: Kansas City, Kansas

Event chronology
Invicta FC 45: Zappitella vs. Delboni II	Invicta FC 46: Rodríguez vs. Torquato II	Invicta FC 47: Ducote vs. Zappitella

Invicta FC 46: Rodríguez vs. Torquato II was a mixed martial arts event headlined by Karina Rodríguez defending her flyweight championship against Daiana Torquato in a rematch from the main event of Invicta FC on AXS TV. Karina was originally scheduled to defend against Ketlen Souza, but Souza withdrew from the bout four days before the event and was replaced by Torquato. Torquato was originally set to fight Milana Dudieva in the night's co-main event. Dudieva was then matched up instead with newcomer Denise Gomes.

At the weigh-ins, Liz Tracy missed weight for her bout, weighing in at 117.8 pounds, 1.8 pounds over the strawweight non-title fight limit. The bout proceeded at catchweight and Tracy was fined 25 percent of her purse, which went to her opponent. A planned fight between Fatima Kline and Nadia Vera was removed from the card.

=== Results ===
Main Card
Weight class				Method	Round	Time	Notes
Flyweight	Karina Rodríguez (c)	def.	Daiana Torquato	Decision (split) (47-48, 48-47, 49-46)	5	5:00	(Note: For the Invicta FC Flyweight Championship.)
Flyweight	Denise Gomes	def.	Milana Dudieva	TKO (knees and punches)	3	1:56
Catchweight (117.8 lbs)	Liz Tracy	def.	Danielle Taylor	Decision (unanimous) (30-26, 30-27, 30-27)	3	5:00
Flyweight	Kristina Williams	def.	Flore Hani	Decision (split) (29-28, 28-29, 29-28)	3	5:00
Atomweight	Monique Adriane	def.	Paulina Granados	Decision (unanimous) (30-26, 30-26, 30-27)	3	5:00

== Invicta FC 45: Zappitella vs. Delboni II ==
Invicta FC 45: Zappitella vs. Delboni II
- Date: January 12, 2022
- Venue: Memorial Hall
- City: Kansas City, Kansas

Event chronology
Invicta FC 44: A New Era	Invicta FC 45: Zappitella vs. Delboni II	Invicta FC 46: Rodriguez vs. Torquato II

Invicta FC 45: Zappitella vs. Delboni II was a mixed martial arts event headlined by Alesha Zappitella defending her atomweight championship against Jéssica Delboni in a rematch from Invicta FC 44. A bout between Emily Whitmire and Hilarie Rose was scheduled but has since been postponed. The originally planned co-main event between Claire Guthrie and Lauren Mueller was removed from the card on December 31. Katie Saull was scheduled to fight Tabatha Watkins, however Watkins was replaced by Tamika Jones on the week of the event. Additionally, Shamir Peshewa replaced Courtney King in the night's co-main event.

At the weigh-ins, Shamir Peshewa and Maria Favela missed weight for their bouts. Peshewa weighed in at 153.4 pounds and Pavela weighed in at 138.4 pounds, 2.4 pounds over the bantamweight non-title fight limit. The bouts proceeded at catchweight and they were fined 25 percent of their purses, which went to their opponents.

=== Results ===
Main Card
Weight class				Method	Round	Time	Notes
Atomweight	Jéssica Delboni	def.	Alesha Zappitella (c)	Decision (unanimous) (50-45, 50-45, 49-46)	5	5:00	(Note: For the Invicta FC Atomweight Championship.)
Catchweight (153.4 lbs)	Ramona Pascual	def.	Shamir Peshewa	TKO (knees to the body and punches)	1	1:00
Bantamweight	Hailey Cowan	def.	Monica Franco	Submission (rear-naked choke)	2	3:17
Flyweight	Helen Peralta	def.	Elise Pone	Decision (unanimous) (30-25, 30-25, 30-26)	3	5:00
Atomweight	Katie Saull	def.	Tamika Jones	Submission (armbar)	1	4:30
Catchweight (138.4 lbs)	Sarah Kleczka	def.	Maria Favela	Decision (split) (28-29, 29-28, 29-28)	3	5:00

== Invicta FC 44: A New Era ==
Invicta FC 44: A New Era
- Date: August 27, 2021
- Venue: Memorial Hall
- City: Kansas City, Kansas

Event chronology
Phoenix Tournament: Atomweight	Invicta FC 44: A New Era	Invicta FC 45: Zappitella vs. Delboni II

Invicta FC 44: A New Era was a mixed martial arts event headlined by a strawweight title bout between Emily Ducote and Danielle Taylor. Lisa Verzosa and Taneisha Tennant fought for the vacant Invicta FC Bantamweight Championship in the co-main event. The main card will air on pay per view with prelims taking place on AXS TV. Lauren Mueller was scheduled to fight Monica Franco but Franco pulled out due to COVID 19 and was replaced by Serena DeJesus. A week before the event, Kelly D'Angelo pulled out of her fight with Jodie Esquibel and was replaced by Liz Tracy. On August 23, the week of the event, Mara Romero Borella and Monique Adriane pulled out of their fights against Brogan Sanchez and Katie Saull respectively. Borella was replaced by Emilee King, while Adriane was replaced by Marisa Messer-Belenchia.

=== Results ===
Main Card (Pay Per View)
Weight class				Method	Round	Time	Notes
Strawweight	Emily Ducote	def.	Danielle Taylor	KO (punch & head kick)	1	2:51	(Note: For the vacant Invicta FC Strawweight Championship.)
Bantamweight	Taneisha Tennant	def.	Lisa Verzosa	Decision (unanimous) (50-45, 50-45, 49-46)	5	5:00	(Note: For the vacant Invicta FC Bantamweight Championship.)
Flyweight	Brogan Walker-Sanchez	def.	Emilee King	Submission (rear-naked choke)	1	4:28	(Note: Sanchez was deducted a point for an illegal knee.)
Catchweight (117.2 lbs)	Liz Tracy	def.	Jodie Esquibel	Decision (split) (28-29, 29-28, 29-28)	3	5:00
Bantamweight	Serena DeJesus	def.	Lauren Mueller	Decision (split) (28-29, 29-28, 29-28)	3	5:00
Preliminary Card (AXS TV)
Flyweight	Helen Peralta	def.	Caitlin Sammons	Decision (unanimous) (30-27, 30-27, 30-27)	3	5:00
Atomweight	Marisa Messer-Belenchia	def.	Katie Saull	Decision (split) (27-30, 29-28, 29-28)	3	5:00
Atomweight	Natalie Salcedo	def.	Katie Perez	Decision (unanimous) (30-26, 30-26, 30-27)	3	5:00
Featherweight	Kayla Yontef	def.	Carlene Chandler	TKO (punches)	2	3:13

=== Bonus awards ===
The following fighters were awarded monetary bonuses:

- Fight of the Night:
- Performance of the Night: Emily Ducote, Brogan Walker-Sanchez, and Kayla Yontef

== Phoenix Tournament: Atomweight ==
Phoenix Tournament: Atomweight
- Date: June 11, 2021
- Venue: Memorial Hall
- City: Kansas City, Kansas

Event chronology
Invicta FC on AXS TV: Rodriguez vs. Torquato	Phoenix Tournament: Atomweight	Invicta FC 44: A New Era

Phoenix Tournament: Atomweight was a mixed martial arts event that featured an atomweight tournament including 8 fighters vying for a shot at the atomweight championship. The tournament participants were announced to include recent title challenger Jéssica Delboni, Lindsey VanZandt, Jillian DeCoursey, Linda Mihalec, Katie Saull, Paulina Granados, Tabatha Watkins, and Katie Perez. Four days before the event, Katie Saull was forced out of the tournament due to travel restrictions and was replaced by Marisa Messer-Belenchia. Like previous Phoenix Tournament events, the first two rounds will be one-round exhibitions, while only the final will be a full three round fight that counts towards the fighter's record.

An online voting system was introduced to determine first round matchups for the Phoenix Tournament.

=== Results ===
Main Card (AXS TV)
Weight class				Method	Round	Time	Notes
Atomweight	Jéssica Delboni	def.	Lindsey VanZandt	Decision (unanimous) (30-27, 29-28, 29-28)	3	5:00	(Note: Atomweight tournament final bout.)
Atomweight	Jéssica Delboni	def.	Marisa Messer-Belenchia	Decision (unanimous) (10-9, 10-9, 10-9)	1	5:00	(Note: Atomweight tournament semifinal bout.)
Atomweight	Lindsey VanZandt	def.	Linda Mihalec	Decision (unanimous) (10-9, 10-9, 10-9)	1	5:00	(Note: Atomweight tournament semifinal bout.)
Atomweight	Samantha Seff	def.	Kara Vislosky	Decision (split)	1	5:00	(Note: Atomweight tournament reserve bout.)
Atomweight	Marisa Messer-Belenchia	def.	Paulina Granados	Decision (split)	1	5:00	(Note: Atomweight tournament quarterfinal bout.)
Atomweight	Linda Mihalec	def.	Jillian DeCoursey	Decision (split)	1	5:00	(Note: Atomweight tournament quarterfinal bout.)
Atomweight	Lindsey VanZandt	def.	Katie Perez	Submission (armbar)	1	3:10	(Note: Atomweight tournament quarterfinal bout.)
Atomweight	Jéssica Delboni	def.	Tabatha Watkins	Decision (unanimous) (10-9, 10-9, 10-9)	1	5:00	(Note: Atomweight tournament quarterfinal bout.)

== Invicta FC on AXS TV: Rodríguez vs. Torquato ==
Invicta FC on AXS TV: Rodríguez vs. Torquato
- Date: May 21, 2021
- Venue: Police Athletic League
- City: Kansas City, Kansas

Event chronology
Invicta FC 43: King vs. Harrison	Invicta FC on AXS TV: Rodríguez vs. Torquato	Phoenix Tournament: Atomweight

Invicta FC: Rodríguez vs. Torquato (also known as Invicta on AXS TV: Rodríguez vs. Torquato) was a mixed martial arts event headlined by Karina Rodríguez against Daiana Torquato for the vacant Invicta flyweight championship. The co-main event will feature Alesha Zappitella defending her atomweight championship against Jéssica Delboni. This event will be the first under the new ownership of Anthem Sports & Entertainment. The entire card will stream worldwide on Invicta's YouTube and Facebook pages, while AXS TV in the US and The Fight Network is Canada will also carry the main card.

Scheduled fights between Emily Ducote and Liz Tracy as well as Taneisha Tennant against Hope Chase were both removed from the card the week before the event.

At the weigh-ins, Josee Storts missed weight for her bout. Storts weighed in at 128.7 pounds, 2.7 pounds over the flyweight non-title fight limit. The bout proceeded at catchweight and she was fined 25 percent of her purse, which went to her opponent Maria Favela.

=== Results ===
Main Card (AXS TV)
Weight class				Method	Round	Time	Notes
Flyweight	Karina Rodríguez	def.	Daiana Torquato	Decision (unanimous) (50-45, 49-46, 48-47)	5	5:00	(Note: For the vacant Invicta FC Flyweight Championship.)
Atomweight	Alesha Zappitella (c)	def.	Jéssica Delboni	Decision (split) (48-47, 47-48, 48-47)	5	5:00	(Note: For the Invicta FC Atomweight Championship.)
Flyweight	Claire Guthrie	def.	Juliana Miller	Decision (unanimous) (30-27, 30-27, 29-28)	3	5:00
Catchweight (128.7 lbs)	Josee Storts	def.	Maria Favela	Decision (unanimous) (29-28, 29-28, 29-28)	3	5:00
Preliminary Card (Facebook/Youtube)
Strawweight	Fatima Kline	def.	Ariana Melendez	Submission (rear-naked choke)	1	3:00
Flyweight	Elise Pone	def.	Chrissy Yandolli	TKO (punches)	2	2:07

=== Bonus awards ===
- Fight of the Night: Karina Rodríguez vs. Daiana Torquato

== Invicta FC 43: King vs. Harrison ==
Invicta FC 43: King vs. Harrison
- Date: November 20, 2020
- Venue: Police Athletic League
- City: Kansas City, Kansas

Event chronology
Invicta FC 42: Cummins vs. Zappitella	Invicta FC 43: King vs. Harrison	Invicta on AXS TV: Rodríguez vs. Torquato

Invicta FC 43: King vs. Harrison was a mixed martial arts event. It was originally scheduled to be headlined by Pearl Gonzalez and Erin Blanchfield fighting for the vacant flyweight title. Due to COVID-19, the planned title fight was forced to be postponed. The previous co-main event of Emily Ducote and Montserrat Ruiz fighting for the vacant strawweight title was then moved up to become the main event. Stephanie Geltmacher was scheduled to fight Trisha Cicero, but Cicero withdrew the week before the event and was replaced by Caitlin Sammons. The event will also feature the promotional debut of undefeated Olympic judo gold medalist, Kayla Harrison.

The day before the event, the planned main event of Ducote vs. Ruiz was called off and postponed due to COVID 19. As a result, Kayla Harrison's debut against Courtney King was moved up to become the new main event.

=== Results ===
Main Card (UFC Fight Pass)
Weight class				Method	Round	Time	Notes
Featherweight	Kayla Harrison	def.	Courtney King	TKO (punches)	2	4:48
Flyweight	Stephanie Geltmacher	def.	Caitlin Sammons	KO (punches)	1	4:28
Catchweight (137.3 lbs)	Hope Chase	def.	Brittney Cloudy	Submission (rear-naked choke)	2	4:37
Strawweight	Meaghan Penning	def.	Alexa Culp	Decision (unanimous) (29-28, 29-28, 29-28)	3	5:00
Strawweight	Juliana Miller	def.	Kendal Holowell	Submission (armbar)	1	2:49

=== Bonus awards ===
The following fighters were awarded monetary bonuses:

- Performance of the Night: Stephanie Geltmacher and Kayla Harrison

== Invicta FC 42: Cummins vs. Zappitella ==
Invicta FC 42: Cummins vs. Zappitella
- Date: September 17, 2020
- Venue: Police Athletic League
- City: Kansas City, Kansas

Event chronology
Invicta FC 41: Morandin vs. Ruiz	Invicta FC 42: Cummins vs. Zappitella	Invicta FC 43: King vs. Harrison

Invicta FC 42: Cummins vs. Zappitella was a mixed martial arts event headlined by Ashley Cummins and Alesha Zappitella for the vacant Invicta Atomweight Championship. A bout between Auttumn Norton and Brittney Cloudy was cancelled the night before the event due to COVID-19. Jennifer Chieng was scheduled to fight Flore Hani but Hani tested positive for COVID-19 as well and was replaced by Helen Peralta.

=== Results ===
Main Card (UFC Fight Pass)
Weight class				Method	Round	Time	Notes
Atomweight	Alesha Zappitella	def.	Ashley Cummins	Submission (Von Flue choke)	4	1:20	(Note: For the vacant Invicta FC Atomweight Championship.)
Bantamweight	Lisa Verzosa	def.	Raquel Canuto	Decision (split) (28-29, 29-28, 29-28)	3	5:00
Strawweight	Jéssica Delboni	def.	Herica Tiburcio	Decision (unanimous) (30-27, 30-27, 29-28)	3	5:00
Flyweight	Victoria Leonardo	def.	Liz Tracy	Decision (unanimous) (29-28, 29-28, 29-28)	3	5:00
Catchweight (120 lbs)	Helen Peralta	def.	Jennifer Chieng	Decision (unanimous) (30-26, 30-27, 30-27)	3	5:00

=== Bonus awards ===
The following fighters were awarded monetary bonuses:

- Fight of the Night: Victoria Leonardo vs. Liz Tracy
- Performance of the Night: Alesha Zappitella

== Invicta FC 41: Morandin vs. Ruiz ==
Invicta FC 41: Morandin vs. Ruiz
- Date: July 30, 2020
- Venue: Police Athletic League
- City: Kansas City, Kansas

Event chronology
Invicta FC 40: Ducote vs. Lima	Invicta FC 41: Morandin vs. Ruiz	Invicta FC 42: Cummins vs. Zappitella

Invicta FC 41: Morandin vs. Ruiz was a mixed martial arts event headlined by Janaisa Morandin and Montserrat Ruiz. The co-main event was set to feature Erin Blanchfield against Stephanie Geltmacher, however Geltmatcher was forced to withdraw and was replaced by Brogan Walker-Sanchez. On July 19, Cynthia Arceo was forced to withdraw from her bout against Itzel Esquivel and was replaced by Kelly D'Angelo. The night of the event, the bout between Esquivel and D'Angelo was removed from the card due to testing for COVID-19.

=== Results ===
Main Card (UFC Fight Pass)
Weight class				Method	Round	Time	Notes
Strawweight	Montserrat Ruiz	def.	Janaisa Morandin	Submission (scarf hold keylock)	1	3:28
Flyweight	Erin Blanchfield	def.	Brogan Walker-Sanchez	Decision (unanimous) (30-26, 30-26, 30-26)	3	5:00
Featherweight	Kaitlin Young	def.	Latoya Walker	Decision (unanimous) (30-26, 30-26, 30-27)	3	5:00
Flyweight	Caitlin Sammons	def.	Claire Guthrie	Decision (split) (28-29, 29-28, 30-27)	3	5:00
Flyweight	Alexa Culp	def.	Natalya Speece	Submission (rear-naked choke)	2	3:59

=== Bonus awards ===
The following fighters were awarded monetary bonuses:

- Fight of the Night: None
- Performance of the Night: Montserrat Ruiz, Erin Blanchfield and Alexa Culp

== Invicta FC 40: Ducote vs. Lima ==
Invicta FC 40: Ducote vs. Lima
- Date: July 2, 2020
- Venue: Police Athletic League
- City: Kansas City, Kansas

Event chronology
Phoenix Series 3	Invicta FC 40: Ducote vs. Lima	Invicta FC 41: Morandin vs. Ruiz

Invicta FC 40: Ducote vs. Lima was a mixed martial arts event headlined by Emily Ducote and Juliana Lima. Laura Gallardo was scheduled to fight Claire Guthrie, but Guthrie withdrew and was replaced by Trisha Cicero. A bout between DeAnna Bennett and Victoria Leonardo was removed the day before the event after Bennett had a medical issue during her weight cut and could not weigh in.

=== Results ===
Main Card (UFC Fight Pass)
Weight class				Method	Round	Time	Notes
Strawweight	Emily Ducote	def.	Juliana Lima	Decision (unanimous) (29-28, 29-28, 29-28)	3	5:00
Atomweight	Alesha Zappitella	def.	Lindsey VanZandt	Decision (split) (28-29, 29-27, 30-27)	3	5:00
Featherweight	Chelsea Chandler	def.	Olivia Parker	Submission (rear-naked choke)	1	1:05
Flyweight	Trisha Cicero	def.	Laura Gallardo	Decision (split) (29-28, 28-29, 29-28)	3	5:00
Strawweight	Genia Goodin	def.	Shelby Koren	Decision (unanimous) (30-27, 29-28, 29-28)	3	5:00

=== Bonus awards ===
The following fighters were awarded monetary bonuses:

- Fight of the Night: none awarded
- Performance of the Night: Emily Ducote and Chelsea Chandler

== Phoenix Series 3 ==
Phoenix Series 3
- Date: March 6, 2020
- Venue: Memorial Hall
- City: Kansas City, Kansas

Event chronology
Invicta FC 39: Frey vs. Cummins II	Phoenix Series 3	Invicta FC 40: Ducote vs. Lima

Phoenix Series 3 was a mixed martial arts event headlined by Lisa Verzosa against Julija Stoliarenko for the vacant Invicta Bantamweight Championship and featured a one night bantamweight tournament as the third installment of The Phoenix Tournament (then known as the Phoenix Series). The participants in the tournament announced on February 5 were Kerri Kenneson, Brittney Victoria, Erin Harpe, Taneisha Tennant, Claire Guthrie, Hope Chase, Auttumn Norton, and Taylor Guardado. This event will feature open scoring between rounds after the Kansas Athletic Commission gave promoters this option following several controversial scorecards at UFC 247. On February 18, it was announced that Erin Harpe and Auttumn Norton had both pulled out of the tournament. As a result, Julia Ottolino, who was to compete in a tournament reserve bout, and Gillian Noll were added as replacements. Ottolino's original opponent, Serena DeJesus received a new opponent in Florina Moeller. On February 28, the scheduled fight between Amber Brown and Sharon Jacobson was cancelled after an injury to Brown. On March 2, four days before the event, Gillian Noll withdrew from the tournament and was replaced by Serena DeJesus, who had been scheduled to be in a tournament reserve bout. As a result, DeJesus was replaced by Kelly Clayton in the reserve bout against Florina Moeller.

=== Results ===
Main Card (UFC Fight Pass)
Weight class				Method	Round	Time	Notes
Bantamweight	Julija Stoliarenko	def.	Lisa Verzosa	Decision (split) (46-49, 48-46, 49-46)	5	5:00	(Note: For the vacant Invicta FC Bantamweight Championship.)
Bantamweight	Taneisha Tennant	def.	Taylor Guardado	Decision (unanimous) (30-27, 30-27, 30-27)	3	5:00	(Note: Bantamweight tournament final bout.)
Strawweight	Kay Hansen	def.	Liana Pirosin	Decision (unanimous) (30-27, 30-27, 30-26)	3	5:00
Bantamweight	Taneisha Tennant	def.	Hope Chase	Decision (unanimous) (10-9, 10-9, 10-9)	1	5:00	(Note: Bantamweight tournament semifinal bout.)
Bantamweight	Taylor Guardado	def.	Serena DeJesus	Decision (split) (10-9, 9-10, 10-9)	1	5:00	(Note: Bantamweight tournament semifinal bout.)
Bantamweight	Mitzi Merry	def.	Morgan Hickam	Decision (unanimous) (10-9, 10-9, 10-9)	1	5:00	(Note: Bantamweight tournament reserve bout.)
Bantamweight	Kelly Clayton	def.	Florina Moeller	Submission (rear-naked choke)	1	4:51	(Note: Bantamweight tournament reserve bout.)
Bantamweight	Taneisha Tennant	def.	Brittney Victoria	Decision (unanimous) (10-9, 10-9, 10-9)	1	5:00	(Note: Bantamweight tournament quarterfinal bout.)
Bantamweight	Hope Chase	def.	Julia Ottolino	Decision (unanimous) (10-9, 10-9, 10-9)	1	5:00	(Note: Bantamweight tournament quarterfinal bout.)
Bantamweight	Taylor Guardado	def.	Claire Guthrie	Decision (unanimous) (10-9, 10-9, 10-9)	1	5:00	(Note: Bantamweight tournament quarterfinal bout.)
Bantamweight	Serena DeJesus	def.	Kerri Kenneson	Decision (unanimous) (10-9, 10-9, 10-9)	1	5:00	(Note: Bantamweight tournament quarterfinal bout.)

== Invicta FC 39: Frey vs. Cummins II ==
Invicta FC 39: Frey vs. Cummins II
- Date: February 7, 2020
- Venue: Memorial Hall
- City: Kansas City, Kansas

Event chronology
Invicta FC 38: Murata vs. Ducote	Invicta FC 39: Frey vs. Cummins II	Phoenix Series 3

Invicta FC 39: Frey vs. Cummins II was a mixed martial arts event that is scheduled to be headlined by Jinh Yu Frey defending her Atomweight Championship against Ashley Cummins. The fight was originally set to headline Invicta FC 37 in October 2019 but Frey pulled out due to injury. Daiana Torquato was scheduled to fight Mariya Agapova, but Agapova was forced to pull out due to injury on January 25 and was replaced by Shanna Young. However Young ended up being deemed medically unfit to compete and the fight was canceled. At the weigh-ins for the event, Jinh Yu Frey missed weight and as a result, was stripped of her atomweight championship. The fight would go on with only Cummins fighting for the title, and if Frey won then she would receive the next title shot.

=== Results ===
Main Card (UFC Fight Pass)
Weight class				Method	Round	Time	Notes
Atomweight	Jinh Yu Frey	def.	Ashley Cummins	Decision (unanimous) (48-47, 48-47, 48-47)	5	5:00	(Note: For the Invicta FC Atomweight Championship for Cummins only.)
Flyweight	Miranda Maverick	def.	Pearl Gonzalez	Decision (unanimous) (30-27, 30-27, 30-26)	3	5:00
Atomweight	Alesha Zappitella	def.	Kelly D'Angelo	Decision (unanimous) (30-27, 30-27, 29-28)	3	5:00
Flyweight	Erin Blanchfield	def.	Victoria Leonardo	KO (head kick & punches)	2	2:06
Atomweight	Jillian DeCoursey	def.	Linda Mihalec	Decision (unanimous) (30-27, 29-28, 29-28)	3	5:00
Bantamweight	Monica Franco	def.	Tina Pettigrew	Decision (unanimous) (30-27, 30-27, 30-26)	3	5:00

=== Bonus awards ===
The following fighters were awarded monetary bonuses:

- Fight of the Night: None
- Performance of the Night: Miranda Maverick and Erin Blanchfield

== Invicta FC 38: Murata vs. Ducote ==
Invicta FC 38: Murata vs. Ducote
- Date: November 1, 2019
- Venue: Memorial Hall
- City: Kansas City, Kansas

Event chronology
Invicta FC 37: Gonzalez vs. Sanchez	Invicta FC 38: Murata vs. Ducote	Invicta FC 39: Frey vs. Cummins II

Invicta FC 38: Murata vs. Ducote was a mixed martial arts event that was headlined by Kanako Murata vs. Emily Ducote for the vacant strawweight championship. The original main event was Vanessa Porto defending her flyweight championship against top contender Karina Rodríguez, who earned her shot by winning the flyweight tournament at Invicta FC 35, however Rodríguez failed to make weight thus was no longer able to contend for the championship and the bout was changed to a non-title fight as the co-main event.

=== Results ===
Main Card (UFC Fight Pass)
Weight class				Method	Round	Time	Notes
Strawweight	Kanako Murata	def.	Emily Ducote	Decision (split) (48-47, 47-48, 49-46)	5	5:00	(Note: For the vacant Invicta FC Strawweight Championship)
Catchweight (126 lbs)	Vanessa Porto	def.	Karina Rodríguez	Decision (unanimous) (29-28, 29-28, 29-28)	3	5:00
Strawweight	Mallory Martin	def.	Cynthia Arceo	Decision (unanimous) (30-26, 30-26, 30-27)	3	5:00
Flyweight	Shanna Young	def.	Maiju Suotama	Decision (unanimous) (29-27, 28-27, 28-26)	3	5:00
Bantamweight	Lisa Verzosa	def.	Kerri Kenneson	Decision (unanimous) (29-28, 29-28, 29-28)	3	5:00
Featherweight	Auttumn Norton	def.	Shaianna Rincon	Decision (unanimous) (30-26, 30-26, 30-26)	3	5:00
Bantamweight	Taneisha Tennant	def.	Serena de Jesus	Decision (unanimous) (29-28, 29-28, 29-28)	3	5:00

=== Bonus awards ===
The following fighters were awarded monetary bonuses:

- Fight of the Night: Vanessa Porto vs. Karina Rodríguez (Rodríguez forfeits bonus due to weight miss) and Lisa Verzosa vs. Kerri Kenneson
- Performance of the Night: None

== Invicta FC 37: Gonzalez vs. Sanchez ==
Invicta FC 37: Gonzalez vs. Sanchez
- Date: October 4, 2019
- Venue: Memorial Hall
- City: Kansas City, Kansas

Event chronology
Phoenix Series 2	Invicta FC 37: Gonzalez vs. Sanchez	Invicta FC 38: Murata vs. Ducote

Invicta FC 37: Gonzalez vs. Sanchez was a mixed martial arts event that will be headlined by Pearl Gonzalez against undefeated Brogan Sanchez. The event was originally scheduled to feature Jinh Yu Frey defending her atomweight championship against Ashley Cummins in the main event, however on September 23, Frey was forced to withdraw due to injury causing the bout to be rescheduled. As a result, the previous co-main event of Gonzalez vs. Sanchez was moved up to become the main event.

=== Results ===
Main Card (UFC Fight Pass)
Weight class				Method	Round	Time	Notes
Flyweight	Pearl Gonzalez	def.	Brogan Walker-Sanchez	Decision (unanimous) (30-27, 30-27, 30-27)	3	5:00
Flyweight	Mariya Agapova	def.	Marilla Santos	TKO (elbows)	1	4:55
Catchweight (116.2 lbs)	Kay Hansen	def.	Nicolle Caliari	Submission (guillotine choke)	3	1:14
Atomweight	Lindsey VanZandt	def.	Shino VanHoose	TKO (injury)	1	0:39
Atomweight	Linda Mihalec	def.	Marisa Messer-Belenchia	Decision (unanimous) (30-27, 30-27, 29-28)	3	5:00
Bantamweight	Hope Chase	def.	Megan Cawley	Submission (rear-naked choke)	1	3:28
Flyweight	Claire Johnson	def.	Jordan Kaaze	Submission (armbar)	3	2:20

=== Bonus awards ===
The following fighters were awarded monetary bonuses:

- Fight of the Night: Kay Hansen vs. Nicolle Caliari
- Performance of the Night: Mariya Agapova and Hope Chase

== Phoenix Series 2 ==
Phoenix Series 2
- Date: September 6, 2019
- Venue: Memorial Hall
- City: Kansas City, Kansas

Event chronology
Invicta FC 36: Sorenson vs. Young	Phoenix Series 2	Invicta FC 37: Gonzalez vs. Sanchez

Phoenix Series 2 was a mixed martial arts event that featured a one-night flyweight tournament as the second installment in The Phoenix Tournament (then known as the Phoenix Series). The participants of the tournament were announced on August 12 to be DeAnna Bennett, Milana Dudieva, Miranda Maverick, Cheri Muraski, Liz Tracy, Daiana Torquato, Marila Santos, and Maiju Suotama. On August 22, Shanna Young replaced Cheri Muraski while on August 27, Victoria Leonardo replaced Marila Santos. The tournament followed standard format for The Phoenix Tournament, including match-ups determined by a random draw. Two non-tournament bouts have been scheduled for the event: a flyweight match between Alexa Conners and Mariya Agapova as the co-main event, and a flyweight match between Josee Storts and Helen Lucero. The card will also feature two tournament reserve bouts. Chantel Coates missed weight for her reserve bout thus she was fined 25% of her fight purse and would no longer be eligible to enter the tournament as a reserve in case of injury.

=== Results ===
Main Card (UFC Fight Pass)
Weight class				Method	Round	Time	Notes
Flyweight	Miranda Maverick	def.	DeAnna Bennett	Submission (rear-naked choke)	3	3:38	(Note: Flyweight tournament final bout.)
Flyweight	Mariya Agapova	def.	Alexa Conners	Submission (rear-naked choke)	1	3:03
Flyweight	Josee Storts	def.	Helen Lucero	Submission (triangle choke)	1	4:21
Flyweight	DeAnna Bennett	def.	Daiana Torquato	Submission (rear-naked choke)	1	3:34	(Note: Flyweight tournament semifinal bout.)
Flyweight	Miranda Maverick	def.	Shanna Young	Submission (rear-naked choke)	1	2:35	(Note: Flyweight tournament semifinal bout.)
Flyweight	Kay Hansen	def.	Carolina Jimenez	Decision (unanimous) (10-9, 10-9, 10-9)	1	5:00	(Note: Flyweight tournament reserve bout.)
Catchweight (129 lbs)	Chantel Coates	def.	Flore Hani	Decision (split) (10-9, 9-10, 10-9)	1	5:00	(Note: Flyweight tournament reserve bout.)
Flyweight	Shanna Young	def.	Maiju Suotama	Decision (unanimous) (10-9, 10-9, 10-9)	1	5:00	(Note: Flyweight tournament quarterfinal bout.)
Flyweight	Miranda Maverick	def.	Victoria Leonardo	Decision (unanimous) (10-9, 10-9, 10-9)	1	5:00	(Note: Flyweight tournament quarterfinal bout.)
Flyweight	DeAnna Bennett	def.	Liz Tracy	Decision (unanimous) (10-9, 10-9, 10-9)	1	5:00	(Note: Flyweight tournament quarterfinal bout.)
Flyweight	Daiana Torquato	def.	Milana Dudieva	Decision (split) (10-9, 9-10, 10-9)	1	5:00	(Note: Flyweight tournament quarterfinal bout.)

== Invicta FC 36: Sorenson vs. Young ==
Invicta FC 36: Sorenson vs. Young
- Date: August 9, 2019
- Venue: Memorial Hall
- City: Kansas City, Kansas

Event chronology
Invicta FC 35: Bennett vs. Rodriguez II	Invicta FC 36: Sorenson vs. Young	Phoenix Series 2

Invicta FC 36: Sorenson vs. Young was a mixed martial arts event headlined by Pam Sorenson vs. Kaitlin Young for the vacated featherweight championship after former champion Felicia Spencer signed with the UFC. Alyse Anderson was scheduled to fight Anastasia Nikolakakos, however Anastasia withdrew a week before the event and was replaced by Katie Saull. At the weigh-ins, Janaisa Morandin missed weight by three pounds over the limit and was fined 25% of her purse. Chantel Coates also missed weight by half a pound over the limit.

=== Results ===
Main Card (UFC Fight Pass)
Weight class				Method	Round	Time	Notes
Featherweight	Pam Sorenson	def.	Kaitlin Young	Decision (unanimous) (50-44, 49-45, 48-45)	5	5:00	(Note: For the vacant Invicta FC Featherweight Championship. Young was deducted a point for an illegal knee.)
Catchweight (119.6 lbs)	Emily Ducote	def.	Janaisa Morandin	KO (punches)	1	4:03
Atomweight	Jéssica Delboni	def.	Lindsey VanZandt	Decision (split) (29-28, 28-29, 29-28)	3	5:00
Flyweight	Victoria Leonardo	def.	Stephanie Geltmacher	Decision (unanimous) (29-28, 29-28, 29-28)	3	5:00	(Note: Originally announced as a split decision victory for Geltmacher due to a score card error.)
Atomweight	Alyse Anderson	def.	Katie Saull	Decision (split) (30-27, 28-29, 29-28)	3	5:00
Catchweight (126.5 lbs)	Caitlin Sammons	def.	Chantel Coates	Submission (rear-naked choke)	2	4:10
Bantamweight	Erin Harpe	def.	Auttumn Norton	Decision (split) (29-28, 28-29, 29-27)	3	5:00
Bantamweight	Julia Ottolino	def.	Megan Cawley	Decision (unanimous) (30-27, 30-27, 30-27)	3	5:00

=== Bonus awards ===
The following fighters were awarded monetary bonuses:

- Fight of the Night: Victoria Leonardo vs. Stephanie Geltmacher
- Performance of the Night: Caitlin Sammons and Emily Ducote

== Invicta FC 35: Bennett vs. Rodriguez II ==
Invicta FC 35: Bennett vs. Rodriguez II
- Date: June 7, 2019
- Venue: Memorial Hall
- City: Kansas City, Kansas

Event chronology
Phoenix Series 1	Invicta FC 35: Bennett vs. Rodriguez II	Invicta FC 36: Sorenson vs. Young

Invicta FC 35: Bennett vs. Rodriguez II was a mixed martial arts event headlined by a rematch between DeAnna Bennett and Karina Rodriguez in the finals of the Invicta FC Flyweight Tournament. The two previously met at Invicta FC 28 in March 2018.

=== Results ===
Main Card (UFC Fight Pass)
Weight class				Method	Round	Time	Notes
Flyweight	Karina Rodríguez	def.	DeAnna Bennett	Decision (unanimous) (29-28, 29-28, 29-28)	3	5:00	(Note: Flyweight tournament final bout.)
Catchweight (106.7 lbs)	Viviane Pereira	def.	Alesha Zappitella	Decision (unanimous) (30-27, 30-27, 30-26)	3	5:00
Strawweight	Kanako Murata	def.	Liana Pirosin	Submission (rear-naked choke)	1	2:10
Bantamweight	Lisa Spangler	def.	Katharina Lehner	Decision (unanimous) (30-27, 30-27, 29-28)	3	5:00
Catchweight (146.4 lbs)	Kaitlin Young	def.	Faith McMah	TKO (punches)	3	3:52
Bantamweight	Chelsea Chandler	def.	Brittney Victoria	TKO (punches)	2	3:58
Catchweight (108.8 lbs)	Kelly D'Angelo	def.	Jillian DeCoursey	Decision (unanimous) (30-27, 30-27, 29-28)	3	5:00
Atomweight	Loma Lookboonmee	def.	Monique Adriane	Decision (unanimous) (30-27, 30-27, 30-27)	3	5:00
Strawweight	Genia Goodin	def.	Valerie Wong	Decision (split) (29-28, 28-29, 29-28)	3	5:00

==== Invicta FC Flyweight Tournament Bracket ====
Semi-finals
(United States) DeAnna Bennett	UD
(United States) Miranda Maverick	3
(Mexico) Karina Rodríguez	SD
(Russia) Milana Dudieva	3

Final
(United States) DeAnna Bennett	3
(Mexico) Karina Rodríguez	UD

Legend
SD	Split Decision
UD	Unanimous Decision
MD	Majority Decision
SUB	Submission
(T)KO	(Technical) Knock Out
L	Loss
#	Round

=== Bonus awards ===
The following fighters were awarded monetary bonuses:

- Fight of the Night: Loma Lookboonmee vs. Monique Adriane
- Performance of the Night: Chelsea Chandler and Kanako Murata

== Phoenix Series 1 ==
Phoenix Series 1
- Date: May 3, 2019
- Venue: Memorial Hall
- City: Kansas City, Kansas

Event chronology
Invicta FC 34: Porto vs. Gonzalez	Phoenix Series 1	Invicta FC 35: Bennett vs. Rodriguez II

Phoenix Series 1 (retroactive nomenclature; originally known as Phoenix Rising 1 or Phoenix Rising Series 1) was a mixed-martial arts event featuring the first in a new series of tournaments produced by Invicta FC for each weight division. The Phoenix Tournament (then known as the Phoenix Rising Series) features a one-night tournament format in which the quarter-final and semi-final bouts are one-round contests, and the tournament final is a three-round bout. Tournament participants are matched up by random draw. Reserve bouts for the tournament are one-round contests, and are classified as exhibitions. Bonuses are awarded for each finish, and the fighter with the fastest finish in the quarterfinals may choose their opponent for the next round from among the other semi-finalists. On March 2, the announced participants in the tournament were Mizuki Inoue, Danielle Taylor, Janaisa Morandin, Juliana Lima, Kailin Curran, Brianna van Buren, Sharon Jacobson, and Sunna Davíðsdóttir.

On April 16, Invicta FC announced the quarter-final matchups for the tournament, as determined by random draw. In addition, the winner of the tournament would become the new Invicta FC Strawweight Champion, earning the title vacated by Virna Jandiroba upon signing with the UFC.

The night before the event, Janaisa Morandin missed weight and was pulled from the tournament while Mizuki was forced to withdraw due to complications with her weight cut. Morandin and Mizuki were replaced in their matchups by Manjit Kolekar and Amber Brown, respectively. Kolekar and Brown were originally matched up against each other in a reserve bout.

=== Results ===
Main Card (UFC Fight Pass)
Weight class				Method	Round	Time	Notes
Strawweight	Brianna Van Buren	def.	Kailin Curran	Submission (rear naked choke)	2	3:49	(Note: Strawweight tournament final bout. For the vacant Invicta FC Strawweight Championship.)
Strawweight	Magdaléna Šormová	def.	Kay Hansen	Decision (split) (28-29, 29-28, 29-28)	3	5:00
Strawweight	Kailin Curran	def.	Sharon Jacobson	Decision (unanimous) (10-9, 10-9, 10-9)	1	5:00	(Note: Strawweight tournament semi-final bout.)
Strawweight	Brianna Van Buren	def.	Juliana Lima	Decision (unanimous) (10-9, 10-9, 10-9)	1	5:00	(Note: Strawweight tournament semi-final bout.)
Strawweight	Alyssa Krahn	def.	Itzel Esquivel	Decision (split) (9-10, 10-9, 10-9)	1	5:00	(Note: Strawweight tournament reserve bout. Exhibition.)
Strawweight	Sharon Jacobson	def.	Amber Brown	Decision (unanimous) (10-9, 10-9, 10-9)	1	5:00	(Note: Strawweight tournament quarter-final bout.)
Strawweight	Brianna Van Buren	def.	Manjit Kolekar	Submission (armbar)	1	3:20	(Note: Strawweight tournament quarter-final bout.)
Strawweight	Juliana Lima	def.	Danielle Taylor	Decision (split) (9-10, 10-9, 10-9)	1	5:00	(Note: Strawweight tournament quarter-final bout.)
Strawweight	Kailin Curran	def.	Sunna Davíðsdóttir	Decision (split) (10-9, 9-10, 10-9)	1	5:00	(Note: Strawweight tournament quarter-final bout.)

==== Invicta FC Strawweight Tournament Bracket ====
Quarter-finals
(India) Manjit Kolekar	1
(United States) Brianna Van Buren	SUB
(United States) Danielle Taylor	1
(Brazil) Juliana Lima	SD
(United States) Kailin Curran	SD
(Iceland) Sunna Davíðsdóttir	1
(United States) Amber Brown	1
(United States) Sharon Jacobson	UD

Semi-finals
(United States) Brianna Van Buren	UD
(Brazil) Juliana Lima	1
(United States) Kailin Curran	UD
(United States) Sharon Jacobson	1

Final
(United States) Brianna Van Buren	SUB
(United States) Kailin Curran	2

Legend
SD	Split Decision
UD	Unanimous Decision
MD	Majority Decision
SUB	Submission
(T)KO	(Technical) Knock Out
L	Loss
#	Round

== Invicta FC 34: Porto vs. Gonzalez ==
Invicta FC 34: Porto vs. Gonzalez
- Date: February 15, 2019
- Venue: Memorial Hall
- City: Kansas City, Kansas

Event chronology
Invicta FC 33: Frey vs. Grusander II	Invicta FC 34: Porto vs. Gonzalez	Phoenix Series 1

Invicta FC 34: Porto vs. Gonzalez was a mixed martial arts event to be headlined by a fight between Vanessa Porto and Pearl Gonzalez for the vacant Invicta FC Flyweight Championship. The event will also feature the beginning of a flyweight tournament to determine the next number one contender. The tournament originally was to feature undefeated Brogan Walker-Sanchez against Milana Dudieva in addition to Tracy Cortez vs. Karina Rodriguez being the reserve bout for the tournament but Walker-Sanchez pulled out so Rodriguez was moved up from the reserve bout into the tournament spot against Dudieva. Rodriguez was replaced in her original bout by Erin Blanchfield. Helena Kolesnyk vs. Faith McMah was removed from the card after Kolesnyk failed to make weight at 11 pounds over the featherweight limit. Holli Logan also missed weight and was fined 25% of her purse.

=== Results ===
Main Card (UFC Fight Pass)
Weight class				Method	Round	Time	Notes
Flyweight	Vanessa Porto	def.	Pearl Gonzalez	Technical Decision (unanimous) (40-36, 39-37, 39-37)	4	2:34	(Note: For the vacant Invicta FC Flyweight Championship. Bout was stopped at 2:34 of round 4 as Gonzalez inadvertently poked Porto in the eye, rendering her unable to continue.)
Flyweight	Karina Rodríguez	def.	Milana Dudieva	Decision (split) (29-28, 29-28, 29-28)	3	5:00	(Note: Invicta FC Flyweight Tournament Semi-Final)
Flyweight	DeAnna Bennett	def.	Miranda Maverick	Decision (unanimous) (29-28, 29-28, 29-28)	3	5:00	(Note: Invicta FC Flyweight Tournament Semi-Final)
Flyweight	Tracy Cortez	def.	Erin Blanchfield	Decision (split) (29-28, 29-28, 28-29)	3	5:00
Flyweight	Victoria Leonardo	def.	Jamie Milanowski	Submission (rear naked choke)	1	2:45
Catchweight (149.9 lbs)	Courtney King	def.	Holli Logan	Submission (rear naked choke)	2	4:46
Flyweight	Caitlin Sammons	def.	Christina Ricker	TKO (leg kick and punches)	2	3:02

==== Invicta FC Flyweight Tournament Bracket ====
Semi-finals
(United States) DeAnna Bennett	UD
(United States) Miranda Maverick	3
(Mexico) Karina Rodríguez	SD
(Russia) Milana Dudieva	3

Final
(United States) DeAnna Bennett
(Mexico) Karina Rodríguez

Legend
SD	Split Decision
UD	Unanimous Decision
MD	Majority Decision
SUB	Submission
(T)KO	(Technical) Knock Out
L	Loss
#	Round

=== Bonus awards ===
The following fighters were awarded monetary bonuses:

- Fight of the Night: Karina Rodríguez vs. Milana Dudieva
- Performance of the Night: Victoria Leonardo and Caitlin Sammons

== Invicta FC 33: Frey vs. Grusander II ==
Invicta FC 33: Frey vs. Grusander II
- Date: December 15, 2018
- Venue: Scottish Rite Temple
- City: Kansas City, Missouri

Event chronology
Invicta FC 32: Spencer vs. Sorenson	Invicta FC 33: Frey vs. Grusander II	Invicta FC 34: Porto vs. Gonzalez

Invicta FC 33: Frey vs Grusander II was a mixed martial arts event headlined by a rematch between Jinh Yu Frey and Minna Grusander for the Invicta FC Atomweight Championship. The two previously headlined Invicta 30 in July where Frey won the championship in a closely contested decision victory. Chantel Coates will meet Ashlynn Kleinbeck in a bout originally scheduled for Invicta FC 31 and that fight will again be planned to air on both Facebook and UFC Fight Pass. Sharon Jacobson was scheduled to fight Kanako Murata but Murata pulled out the week before the event and was replaced by Kay Hansen. At the weigh-ins, Jamie Moyle weighed in at 9 pounds over the strawweight limit and was fined 25% of her purse.

=== Results ===
Main Card (UFC Fight Pass)
Weight class				Method	Round	Time	Notes
Atomweight	Jinh Yu Frey (c)	def.	Minna Grusander	Decision (split) (48-47, 47-48, 48-47)	5	5:00	(Note: For the Invicta FC Atomweight Championship)
Strawweight	Danielle Taylor	def.	Montserrat Ruiz	Decision (unanimous) (30-27, 30-27, 29-28)	3	5:00
Strawweight	Kay Hansen	def.	Sharon Jacobson	Submission (armbar)	3	4:43
Atomweight	Alesha Zappitella	def.	Amber Brown	Decision (unanimous) (29-28, 29-28, 29-28)	3	5:00
Catchweight (125.1 lbs)	Brianna Van Buren	def.	Jamie Moyle	Decision (unanimous) (30-27, 30-27, 30-26)	3	5:00
Bantamweight	Brittney Victoria	def.	Sarah Kleczka	Decision (unanimous) (29-28, 29-28, 29-28)	3	5:00
Atomweight	Anastasia Nikolakakos	def.	Ashley Medina	TKO (punches)	2	3:26
Flyweight	Chantel Coates	def.	Ashlynn Kleinbeck	KO (punch)	1	0:28

=== Bonus awards ===
The following fighters were awarded monetary bonuses:

- Fight of the Night: None
- Performance of the Night: Kay Hansen, Alesha Zappitella, Anastasia Nikolakakos, and Chantel Coates

== Invicta FC 32: Spencer vs. Sorenson ==
Invicta FC 32: Spencer vs. Sorenson
- Date: November 16, 2018
- Venue: Firelake Arena
- City: Shawnee, Oklahoma

Event chronology
Invicta FC 31: Jandiroba vs. Morandin	Invicta FC 32: Spencer vs. Sorenson	Invicta FC 33: Frey vs. Grusander II

Invicta FC 32: Spencer vs. Sorenson was a mixed martial arts event headlined by Felicia Spencer vs. Pam Sorenson for the vacant Invicta FC Featherweight Championship. The event will also feature the Invicta return of Kaitlin Young, who had been working as a matchmaker for the company.

Erin Blanchfield was originally scheduled to fight Luanna Alzuguir but Alzuguir's MMA debut was delayed so she was replaced by Kay Hansen, who called out Blanchfield after her victory at Invicta FC 31. Mizuki was originally scheduled to fight Heather Jo Clark in the semi main event but Clark was forced out due to injury on October 4 and replaced by former UFC fighter Viviane Pereira who would make her Invicta debut. Kaitlin Young was set to fight Zarah Fairn Dos Santos, however due to visa issues Dos Santos was replaced by Sarah Patterson on the week of the event and the fight proceeded at 150-pound catchweight affair to accommodate Patterson.

At the weigh-ins, Mizuki Inoue, Sarah Patterson and Chelsea Chandler missed the required weight for their respective fights. Inoue weighed in at 116.4 pounds, 0.4 pound over the strawweight non-title fight limit of 126. Patterson weighed in at 154.5 pounds, 3.5 pound over the catchweight fight limit of 150. Meanwhile, Chandler weighed in at 136.6 pounds, 0.6 pound over the bantamweight non-title fight limit of 136. All of them were fined 25 percent of their purse, which went to their opponents Viviane Pereira, Kaitlin Young and Mitzi Merry.

=== Results ===
Main Card (UFC Fight Pass)
Weight class				Method	Round	Time	Notes
Featherweight	Felicia Spencer	def.	Pam Sorenson	Submission (rear-naked choke)	4	4:23	(Note: For the vacant Invicta FC Featherweight Championship)
Catchweight (116.4 lbs)	Mizuki Inoue	def.	Viviane Pereira	Decision (unanimous) (30-27, 30-27, 30-27)	3	5:00
Atomweight	Ashley Cummins	def.	Jéssica Delboni	Decision (unanimous) (29-28, 29-28, 29-28)	3	5:00
Catchweight (154.5 lbs)	Kaitlin Young	def.	Sarah Patterson	TKO (leg kick and punches)	1	1:25
Bantamweight	Julia Avila	def.	Alexa Conners	TKO (front kick and punches)	2	4:43
Flyweight	Erin Blanchfield	def.	Kay Hansen	Decision (majority) (28-28, 29-28, 29-28)	3	5:00
Flyweight	Stephanie Geltmacher	def.	Liz Tracy	Decision (unanimous) (30-27, 30-27, 29-28)	3	5:00
Strawweight	Kathryn Paprocki	def.	Isis Verbeek	Decision (unanimous) (28-27, 28-27, 28-27)	3	5:00	(Note: Paprocki was deducted a point for a headbutt)
Catchweight (136.6 lbs)	Chelsea Chandler	def.	Mitzi Merry	Decision (unanimous) (30-27, 30-27, 30-26)	3	5:00

=== Bonus awards ===
The following fighters were awarded monetary bonuses:

- Fight of the Night: Stephanie Geltmacher vs. Liz Tracy
- Performance of the Night: Julia Avila

== Invicta FC 31: Jandiroba vs. Morandin ==
Invicta FC 31: Jandiroba vs. Morandin
- Date: September 1, 2018
- Venue: Scottish Rite Temple
- City: Kansas City, Missouri

Event chronology
Invicta FC 30: Frey vs. Grusander	Invicta FC 31: Jandiroba vs. Morandin	Invicta FC 32: Spencer vs. Sorenson

Invicta FC 31: Jandiroba vs. Morandin was a mixed martial arts event to be headlined by Virna Jandiroba defending her strawweight championship against Janaisa Morandin. The bout was originally scheduled to headline Invicta 28 before Morandin pulled out due to injury. Shanna Young was scheduled to fight Raquel Pa'aluhi, but Pa'aluhi pulled out and was replaced by Lisa Spangler.

An additional fight between debuting fighters Chantel Coates and Ashlynn Kleinbeck was scheduled as a bonus fight to air on Facebook Live but was cancelled after Kleinbeck had to have her appendix removed. As a result, the first fight of the night aired on both UFC Fight Pass and Facebook Live.

At the weigh-ins, Mallory Martin weighed in at 117 pounds, 1 pounds over the strawweight non-title fight limit of 116 pounds. Her bout against Ashley Nichols was contested at catchweight and she forfeited 25 percent of her purse.

=== Results ===
Main Card (UFC Fight Pass)
Weight class				Method	Round	Time	Notes
Strawweight	Virna Jandiroba (c)	def.	Janaisa Morandin	Submission (arm-triangle choke)	2	2:23	(Note: For the Invicta FC Strawweight Championship)
Flyweight	Pearl Gonzalez	def.	Daiane Firmino	Decision (unanimous) (30-27, 29-28, 29-27)	3	5:00
Bantamweight	Lisa Spangler	def.	Shanna Young	Decision (split) (28-29, 30-27, 29-28)	3	5:00
Catchweight (117 lbs)	Mallory Martin	def.	Ashley Nichols	TKO (elbows)	3	1:05
Flyweight	Miranda Maverick	def.	Victoria Leonardo	Submission (armbar)	1	3:26
Atomweight	Kelly D'Angelo	def.	Lindsey VanZandt	Decision (unanimous) (30-27, 30-27, 29-28)	3	5:00
Strawweight	Kay Hansen	def.	Helen Peralta	TKO (elbows)	3	4:16
Featherweight	Holli Salazar	vs.	Audrey Drew	Draw (unanimous) (28-28, 28-28, 28-28)	3	5:00	(Note: Drew was deducted a point due to a headbutt.)

=== Bonus awards ===
The following fighters were awarded monetary bonuses:

- Fight of the Night: Lisa Spangler vs. Shanna Young
- Performance of the Night: Virna Jandiroba and Miranda Maverick

== Invicta FC 30: Frey vs. Grusander ==
Invicta FC 30: Frey vs. Grusander
- Date: July 21, 2018
- Venue: Scottish Rite Temple
- City: Kansas City, Missouri

Event chronology
Invicta FC 29: Kaufman vs. Lehner	Invicta FC 30: Frey vs. Grusander	Invicta FC 31: Jandiroba vs. Morandin

Invicta FC 30: Frey vs. Grusander was a mixed martial arts event to be headlined by Jinh Yu Frey vs. Minna Grusander fighting for the vacant atomweight championship. Alesha Zappitella was scheduled to fight Shino VanHoose but VanHoose pulled out due to injury and was replaced by Jillian DeCoursey. Kerri Kenneson was set to fight Alexa Conners but Conners pulled out due to injury. Stephanie Geltmacher, who had her Bellator fight cancelled on July 12, stepped in to replace Conners.

=== Results ===
Main Card (UFC Fight Pass)
Weight class				Method	Round	Time	Notes
Atomweight	Jinh Yu Frey	def.	Minna Grusander	Decision (unanimous) (49-46, 48-47, 48-47)	5	5:00	(Note: For the vacant Invicta FC Atomweight Championship)
Featherweight	Felicia Spencer	def.	Helena Kolesnyk	Submission (rear-naked choke)	2	1:47
Strawweight	Heather Jo Clark	def.	Kinberly Novaes	Decision (unanimous) (30-27, 29-28, 29-28)	3	5:00
Flyweight	Brogan Walker-Sanchez	def.	Miranda Maverick	Decision (unanimous) (30-27, 30-27, 29-28)	3	5:00
Bantamweight	Stephanie Geltmacher	def.	Kerri Kenneson	TKO (elbows)	1	3:32
Atomweight	Alesha Zappitella	def.	Jillian DeCoursey	Decision (unanimous) (30-27, 30-27, 30-27)	3	5:00
Atomweight	Alyse Anderson	def.	Stephanie Alba	Technical Submission (triangle choke)	2	3:12
Flyweight	Erin Blanchfield	def.	Brittney Cloudy	Decision (split) (29-28, 28-29, 29-28)	3	5:00

=== Bonus awards ===
The following fighters were awarded monetary bonuses:

- Fight of the Night: None awarded
- Performance of the Night: Felicia Spencer, Stephanie Geltmacher, Alesha Zappitella and Alyse Anderson

== Invicta FC 29: Kaufman vs. Lehner ==
Invicta FC 29: Kaufman vs. Lehner
- Date: May 4, 2018
- Venue: Scottish Rite Temple
- City: Kansas City, Missouri

Event chronology
Invicta FC 28: Mizuki vs. Jandiroba	Invicta FC 29: Kaufman vs. Lehner	Invicta FC 30: Frey vs. Grusander

Invicta FC 29: Kaufman vs. Lehner was a mixed martial arts event headlined by Sarah Kaufman vs. Katharina Lehner fighting for the vacant bantamweight championship. Lisa Spangler was set to fight Yaya Rincon but the week of the event, Rincon pulled out of the bout and was replaced by Sarah Kleczka. 19 year old Croatian prospect Adriana Vukovic was scheduled to make her debut at this event but an opponent was not found for her, pushing her debut back to a future event.

=== Results ===
Main Card (UFC Fight Pass)
Weight class				Method	Round	Time	Notes
Bantamweight	Sarah Kaufman	def.	Katharina Lehner	Submission (rear-naked choke)	3	4:30	(Note: For the vacant Invicta FC Bantamweight Championship)
Catchweight (139.6 lbs)	Pannie Kianzad	def.	Bianca Daimoni	Decision (unanimous) (30-27, 30-27, 30-27)	3	5:00
Catchweight (126.3 lbs)	Pearl Gonzalez	def.	Barbara Acioly	Submission (armbar)	1	1:30
Bantamweight	Marciea Allen	def.	Julia Avila	TKO (injury)	1	0:49
Flyweight	Liz Tracy	def.	Cheri Muraski	Decision (unanimous) (29-28, 30-27, 30-27)	3	5:00
Bantamweight	Lisa Spangler	def.	Sarah Kleczka	Decision (unanimous) (29-28, 29-28, 29-28)	3	5:00
Featherweight	Macy Chiasson	def.	Allison Schmidt	Decision (unanimous) (30-27, 30-27, 30-27)	3	5:00
Strawweight	Helen Peralta	def.	Cheyanne Vlismas	Decision (unanimous) (30-27, 29-28, 29-28)	3	5:00

=== Bonus awards ===
The following fighters were awarded monetary bonuses:

- Fight of the Night: Sarah Kaufman vs. Katharina Lehner
- Performance of the Night: Pearl Gonzalez and Pannie Kianzad

== Invicta FC 28: Mizuki vs. Jandiroba ==
Invicta FC 28: Mizuki vs. Jandiroba
- Date: March 24, 2018
- Venue: Union Event Center
- City: Salt Lake City, Utah

Event chronology
Invicta FC 27: Kaufman vs. Kianzad	Invicta FC 28: Mizuki vs. Jandiroba	Invicta FC 29: Kaufman vs. Lehner

Invicta FC 28: Mizuki vs. Jandiroba was a mixed martial arts event headlined by Mizuki Inoue vs. Virna Jandiroba fighting for the vacant strawweight championship. The event was originally scheduled to feature Virna Jandiroba vs. Janaisa Morandin for the title but Morandin pulled out of the fight on March 2. Mizuki was initially set to face Milana Dudieva before stepping in to replace Morandin in the main event. As a result, Dudieva was matched against Christina Marks.

=== Results ===
Main Card (UFC Fight Pass)
Weight class				Method	Round	Time	Notes
Strawweight	Virna Jandiroba	def.	Mizuki Inoue	Decision (split) (49-46, 46-49, 49-46)	5	5:00	(Note: For the vacant Invicta FC Strawweight Championship)
Catchweight (127.9 lbs)	DeAnna Bennett	def.	Karina Rodríguez	Decision (split) (30-27, 27-30, 30-27)	3	5:00
Flyweight	Milana Dudieva	def.	Christina Marks	TKO (punches)	2	3:57
Strawweight	Pearl Gonzalez	def.	Kali Robbins	Decision (unanimous) (30-27, 30-26, 30-27)	3	5:00
Atomweight	Minna Grusander	def.	Fernanda Barros	TKO (punches)	2	4:26
Strawweight	Kalyn Schwartz	def.	Kay Hansen	TKO (punches)	2	4:27
Bantamweight	Kerri Kenneson	def.	Chelsea Chandler	Decision (unanimous) (30-27, 30-27, 30-27)	3	5:00
Atomweight	Jillian DeCoursey	def.	Rebekah Levine	Decision (unanimous) (30-27, 30-27, 30-27)	3	5:00
Flyweight	Tracy Cortez	def.	Kaytlin Neil	Decision (unanimous) (30-27, 30-27, 30-27)	3	5:00

=== Bonus awards ===
The following fighters were awarded monetary bonuses:

- Fight of the Night: Pearl Gonzalez vs. Kali Robbins
- Performance of the Night: Kalyn Schwartz and Minna Grusander

== Invicta FC 27: Kaufman vs. Kianzad ==
Invicta FC 27: Kaufman vs. Kianzad
- Date: January 13, 2018
- Venue: Scottish Rite Temple
- City: Kansas City, Missouri

Event chronology
Invicta FC 26: Maia vs. Niedźwiedź	Invicta FC 27: Kaufman vs. Kianzad	Invicta FC 28: Mizuki vs. Jandiroba

Invicta FC 27: Kaufman vs. Kianzad was a mixed martial arts event headlined by veteran Sarah Kaufman returning to Invicta against Pannie Kianzad. On December 6, Invicta announced Kaufman had been signed to return for a headline bout. A strawweight bout between Mallory Martin and Tiffany Masters was made after being originally scheduled for Invicta FC 24.

=== Results ===
Main Card (UFC Fight Pass)
Weight class				Method	Round	Time	Notes
Catchweight (136.7 lbs)	Sarah Kaufman	def.	Pannie Kianzad	Decision (unanimous) (30-27, 30-27, 30-27)	3	5:00
Flyweight	Vanessa Porto	def.	Mariana Morais	Submission (rear-naked choke)	1	4:19
Strawweight	Sharon Jacobson	def.	Ashley Nichols	Decision (unanimous) (30-27, 29-28, 29-28)	3	5:00
Atomweight	Ashley Cummins	def.	Stephanie Alba	Decision (unanimous) (30-27, 30-27, 30-27)	3	5:00
Flyweight	Brogan Walker-Sanchez	def.	Cheri Muraski	Decision (split) (29-28, 28-29, 29-28)	3	5:00
Featherweight	Felicia Spencer	def.	Akeela Al-Hameed	Decision (unanimous) (30-27, 30-27, 30-27)	3	5:00
Catchweight (117.4 lbs)	Mallory Martin	def.	Tiffany Masters	TKO (punches)	2	3:36
Atomweight	Loma Lookboonmee	def.	Melissa Wang	Decision (unanimous) (29-27, 29-26, 29-26)	3	5:00	(Note: Lookboonmee was deducted a point for illegal knees.)
Strawweight	Helen Peralta	def.	Jade Ripley	TKO (punches)	1	2:22

=== Bonus awards ===
The following fighters were awarded monetary bonuses:

- Fight of the Night: Sharon Jacobson vs. Ashley Nichols and Felicia Spencer vs. Akeela Al-Hameed
- Performance of the Night: None awarded

== Invicta FC 26: Maia vs. Niedźwiedź ==
Invicta FC 26: Maia vs. Niedźwiedź
- Date: December 8, 2017
- Venue: Scottish Rite Temple
- City: Kansas City, Missouri

Event chronology
Invicta FC 25: Kunitskaya vs. Pa'aluhi	Invicta FC 26: Maia vs. Niedźwiedź	Invicta FC 27: Kaufman vs. Kianzad

Invicta FC 26: Maia vs. Niedźwiedź was a mixed martial arts event headlined by Jennifer Maia defending her flyweight championship against top contender Agnieszka Niedzwiedz. Vanessa Porto was scheduled to fight Jessica-Rose Clark, but Clark accepted a fight with the UFC and was replaced by Milana Dudieva. On November 13, Invicta announced the signing of the undefeated Mackenzie Dern to debut against Kaline Medeiros. Janaisa Morandin was scheduled to fight Mizuki Inoue, but Mizuki pulled out of the fight on November 27 and was replaced by Kinberly Novaes

=== Results ===
Main Card (UFC Fight Pass)
Weight class				Method	Round	Time	Notes
Flyweight	Jennifer Maia (c)	def.	Agnieszka Niedźwiedź	Decision (unanimous) (49-46, 49-46, 49-46)	5	5:00	(Note: For the Invicta FC Flyweight Championship)
Strawweight	Mackenzie Dern	def.	Kaline Medeiros	Submission (armbar)	3	4:45
Catchweight (121.6 lbs)	Janaisa Morandin	def.	Kinberly Novaes	Decision (unanimous) (30-27, 30-27, 30-27)	3	5:00
Catchweight (127.6 lbs)	Vanessa Porto	def.	Milana Dudieva	TKO (punch to the body)	3	3:02
Catchweight (117.6 lbs)	Virna Jandiroba	def.	Amy Montenegro	Submission (armbar)	1	2:50
Catchweight (106.3 lbs)	Amber Brown	def.	Tessa Simpson	Submission (armbar)	1	0:50
Flyweight	Karina Rodríguez	def.	Christine Ferea	Decision (unanimous) (30-27, 29-28, 29-28)	3	5:00
Strawweight	Kay Hansen	def.	Emilee Prince	Submission (armbar)	1	1:23

=== Bonus awards ===
The following fighters were awarded monetary bonuses:

- Fight of the Night: Not awarded
- Performance of the Night: Jennifer Maia, Mackenzie Dern, Janaisa Morandin, and Virna Jandiroba

== Invicta FC 25: Kunitskaya vs. Paʻaluhi ==
Invicta FC 25: Kunitskaya vs. Paʻaluhi
- Date: August 31, 2017
- Venue: Tachi Palace
- City: Lemoore, California

Event chronology
Invicta FC 24: Dudieva vs. Borella	Invicta FC 25: Kunitskaya vs. Paʻaluhi	Invicta FC 26: Maia vs. Niedźwiedź

Invicta FC 25: Kunitskaya vs. Paʻaluhi was a mixed martial arts event headlined by a fight between Yana Kunitskaya and Raquel Paʻaluhi for the vacated bantamweight championship. The co-main event was originally scheduled to be Lívia Renata Souza facing Jodie Esquibel for the vacated strawweight championship but Esquibel pulled out due to injury. Esquibel was replaced by Janaisa Morandin and the fight was then changed to a non-title bout. Amberlynn Orr was set to face Kelly McGill-Velasco but Kelly accepted a fight with the UFC and was replaced by newcomer Sarah Kleczka. Yaya Rincón was set to face Stephanie Egger but Egger withdrew and was replaced by Courtney King.

=== Results ===
Main Card (UFC Fight Pass)
Weight class				Method	Round	Time	Notes
Bantamweight	Yana Kunitskaya	def.	Raquel Paʻaluhi	Decision (unanimous) (50-45, 50-45, 50-45)	5	5:00	(Note: For the vacant Invicta FC Bantamweight Championship)
Strawweight	Lívia Renata Souza	def.	Janaisa Morandin	Decision (unanimous) (30-27, 29-28, 29-28)	3	5:00
Catchweight (140.5 lbs)	Katharina Lehner	def.	Alexa Conners	TKO (punches)	1	4:21
Catchweight (117.4 lbs)	Kali Robbins	def.	Sharon Jacobson	Submission (armbar)	1	0:42
Atomweight	Shino VanHoose	def.	Alyse Anderson	Decision (split) (28-29, 30-27, 29-28)	3	5:00
Bantamweight	Sarah Kleczka	def.	Amberlynn Orr	Decision (split) (28-29, 29-28, 29-28)	3	5:00
Featherweight	Yaya Rincón	def.	Courtney King	TKO (punches)	2	3:41
Flyweight	Cheri Muraski	def.	Tracy Cortez	Submission (guillotine choke)	2	2:42
Atomweight	Jillian DeCoursey	def.	Ashley Medina	Decision (split) (28-29, 29-28, 29-28)	3	5:00

=== Bonus awards ===
The following fighters were awarded monetary bonuses:

- Fight of the Night: Lívia Renata Souza vs. Janaisa Morandin
- Performance of the Night: Yana Kunitskaya and Yaya Rincón

== Invicta FC 24: Dudieva vs. Borella ==
Invicta FC 24: Dudieva vs. Borella
- Date: July 15, 2017
- Venue: Scottish Rite Temple
- City: Kansas City, Missouri

Event chronology
Invicta FC 23: Porto vs. Niedźwiedź	Invicta FC 24: Dudieva vs. Borella	Invicta FC 25: Kunitskaya vs. Pa'aluhi

Invicta FC 24: Dudieva vs. Borella was a mixed martial arts event originally scheduled to be headlined by Megan Anderson; defending her featherweight championship against Helena Kolesnyk. However, Megan was signed by the UFC. As a result, Invicta bantamweight champion Tonya Evinger would move up to featherweight to replace Anderson in the fight against Kolesnyk. However, Anderson would end up pulling out of her UFC fight which then led to Evinger stepping in for that fight, removing her from this event. Due to the change, Helena Kolesnyk received a new opponent in Pam Sorenson while the previous co-main event of Milana Dudieva vs. Mara Romero Borella was moved up to become the new main event. A bout between Yana Kunitskaya and Raquel Pa'aluhi was removed with plans to reschedule due to Kunitskaya suffering an injury. The fight between Mallory Martin and Tiffany Masters was cancelled the day before the event due to medical issues.

=== Results ===
Main Card (UFC Fight Pass)
Weight class				Method	Round	Time	Notes
Flyweight	Mara Romero Borella	def.	Milana Dudieva	Decision (split) (30-27, 28-29, 29-28)	3	5:00
Atomweight	Jinh Yu Frey	def.	Ashley Cummins	Decision (unanimous) (30-27, 30-27, 29-28)	3	5:00
Catchweight (149.6 lbs)	Pam Sorenson	def.	Helena Kolesnyk	Submission (armbar)	1	3:12
Flyweight	Karina Rodríguez	def.	Barbara Acioly	TKO (punches)	1	2:14
Strawweight	Miranda Maverick	def.	Gabby Romero	Decision (unanimous) (30-26, 29-28, 30-27)	3	5:00
Strawweight	Sunna Davíðsdóttir	def.	Kelly D'Angelo	Decision (unanimous) (30-26, 30-27, 30-27)	3	5:00
Catchweight (149.5 lbs)	Felicia Spencer	def.	Amy Coleman	Submission (rear-naked choke)	1	3:17

=== Bonus awards ===
The following fighters were awarded monetary bonuses:

- Fight of the Night: Sunna Davíðsdóttir vs. Kelly D'Angelo
- Performance of the Night: Felicia Spencer and Karina Rodríguez

== Invicta FC 23: Porto vs. Niedźwiedź ==
Invicta FC 23: Porto vs. Niedźwiedź
- Date: May 20, 2017
- Venue: Scottish Rite Temple
- City: Kansas City, Missouri

Event chronology
Invicta FC 22: Evinger vs. Kunitskaya II	Invicta FC 23: Porto vs. Niedźwiedź	Invicta FC 24: Dudieva vs. Borella

Invicta FC 23: Porto vs. Niedźwiedź was the third women's mixed martial event held by Invicta FC in 2017 and is scheduled to be headlined by a flyweight bout between Vanessa Porto and Agnieszka Niedźwiedź.

=== Results ===
Main Card (UFC Fight Pass)
Weight class				Method	Round	Time	Notes
Flyweight	Agnieszka Niedźwiedź	def.	Vanessa Porto	Decision (unanimous) (29-28, 29-28, 29-28)	3	5:00
Flyweight	Roxanne Modafferi	def.	Sarah D'Alelio	TKO (elbows)	3	1:37
Atomweight	Hérica Tibúrcio	def.	Tessa Simpson	Decision (split) (29-28, 28-29, 29-28)	3	5:00
Catchweight (140 lbs)	Kelly Faszholz	def.	Elizabeth Phillips	Decision (unanimous) (30-27, 30-27, 30-27)	3	5:00
Flyweight	Andrea Lee	def.	Liz Tracy	Decision (split) (30-27, 28-29, 29-28)	3	5:00
Featherweight	Ediane Gomes	def.	Pam Sorenson	Decision (split) (28-29, 29-28, 29-28)	3	5:00
Strawweight	Tiffany van Soest	def.	Christine Ferea	Decision (unanimous) (29-28, 29-28, 29-28)	3	5:00
Bantamweight	Shaianna Rincon	def.	Brooksie Bayard	Decision (unanimous) (30-27, 29-28, 29-28)	3	5:00

=== Bonus awards ===
The following fighters were awarded monetary bonuses:

- Fight of the Night: Roxanne Modafferi vs. Sarah D'Alelio and Hérica Tibúrcio vs. Tessa Simpson
- Performance of the Night: none awarded

== Invicta FC 22: Evinger vs. Kunitskaya II ==
Invicta FC 22: Evinger vs. Kunitskaya II
- Date: March 25, 2017
- Venue: Scottish Rite Temple
- City: Kansas City, Missouri

Event chronology
Invicta FC 21: Anderson vs. Tweet	Invicta FC 22: Evinger vs. Kunitskaya II	Invicta FC 23: Porto vs. Niedźwiedź

Invicta FC 22: Evinger vs. Kunitskaya II was a mixed martial arts event headlined by Tonya Evinger defending her bantamweight championship in a rematch against Yana Kunitskaya. The rematch comes after a controversial finish to their first fight, which headlined Invicta FC 20 and was overturned to a no contest. In the co-main event, Invicta atomweight champion Ayaka Hamasaki will move up to strawweight for a fight against former strawweight champion Lívia Renata Souza. A fight between Jinh Yu Frey and Janaisa Morandin was scheduled but canceled two days before the event when Morandin failed to make weight.

=== Results ===
Main Card (UFC Fight Pass)
Weight class				Method	Round	Time	Notes
Bantamweight	Tonya Evinger (c)	def.	Yana Kunitskaya	Submission (rear-naked choke)	2	4:32	(Note: For the Invicta FC Bantamweight Championship)
Strawweight	Lívia Renata Souza	def.	Ayaka Hamasaki	TKO (punches)	1	1:41
Catchweight (117.6 lbs)	Jodie Esquibel	def.	DeAnna Bennett	Decision (split) (28-29, 29-28, 29-28)	3	5:00
Atomweight	Ashley Cummins	def.	Amber Brown	Decision (unanimous) (30-27, 29-28, 29-28)	3	5:00
Strawweight	Sunna Davíðsdóttir	def.	Mallory Martin	Decision (unanimous) (30-27, 29-28, 29-28)	3	5:00
Catchweight (120.5 lbs)	Miranda Maverick	def.	Kal Holliday	Submission (armbar)	1	3:01
Featherweight	Felicia Spencer	def.	Madison McElhaney	Decision (unanimous) (30-27, 30-27, 29-28)	3	5:00

=== Bonus awards ===
The following fighters were awarded monetary bonuses:

- Fight of the Night: Sunna Davíðsdóttir vs. Mallory Martin
- Performance of the Night: Lívia Renata Souza and Ashley Cummins

== Invicta FC 21: Anderson vs. Tweet ==
Invicta FC 21: Anderson vs. Tweet
- Date: January 14, 2017
- Venue: Scottish Rite Temple
- City: Kansas City, Missouri

Event chronology
Invicta FC 20: Evinger vs. Kunitskaya	Invicta FC 21: Anderson vs. Tweet	Invicta FC 22: Evinger vs. Kunitskaya II

Invicta FC 21: Anderson vs. Tweet was a mixed martial arts event that will be headlined by a bout between top featherweight contenders Megan Anderson and Charmaine Tweet competing for the interim featherweight championship. The event was scheduled to feature the MMA debut of undefeated professional boxer Heather Hardy against Brieta Carpenter, however Carpenter pulled out due to injury and the fight was removed from the card. A fight between Leah Letson and former UFC fighter Elizabeth Phillips was added instead. DeAnna Bennett was scheduled to fight Jodie Esquibel but pulled out of the fight and was replaced by Kali Robbins. Esquibel was then set to fight Robbins at a catchweight of 120 lbs but Robbins missed weight and the fight was canceled.

=== Results ===
Main Card (UFC Fight Pass)
Weight class				Method	Round	Time	Notes
Featherweight	Megan Anderson	def.	Charmaine Tweet	TKO (punches and head kick)	2	2:05	(Note: For the interim Invicta FC Featherweight Championship)
Bantamweight	Raquel Pa'aluhi	def.	Pannie Kianzad	Submission (rear-naked choke)	1	3:40
Featherweight	Leah Letson	def.	Elizabeth Phillips	KO (head kick and punches)	1	1:18
Bantamweight	Aspen Ladd	def.	Sijara Eubanks	Decision (unanimous) (30-27, 30-27, 29-28)	3	5:00
Flyweight	Andrea Lee	def.	Jenny Liou	KO (punches)	1	1:14
Strawweight	Amy Montenegro	def.	Celine Haga	Decision (unanimous) (29-28, 29-28, 29-28)	3	5:00
Flyweight	Christine Ferea	def.	Rachael Ostovich	TKO (punches)	3	1:29

=== Bonus awards ===
The following fighters were awarded monetary bonuses:

- Fight of the Night: Amy Montenegro vs. Celine Haga ($1,500 each)
- Performance of the Night: Megan Anderson and Leah Letson ($1,000 each)

== Invicta FC 20: Evinger vs. Kunitskaya ==
Invicta FC 20: Evinger vs. Kunitskaya
- Date: November 18, 2016
- Venue: Scottish Rite Temple
- City: Kansas City, Missouri

Event chronology
Invicta FC 19: Maia vs. Modafferi	Invicta FC 20: Evinger vs. Kunitskaya	Invicta FC 21: Anderson vs. Tweet

Invicta FC 20: Evinger vs. Kunitskaya was a mixed martial arts event that was headlined by Invicta FC bantamweight champion Tonya Evinger defending her title against Russian newcomer Yana Kunitskaya. In the co-main event, strawweight champion Angela Hill will defend against Kaline Medeiros. In the controversial main event, Kunitskaya made Evinger submit to an armbar in the first round after the referee forced Evinger to move from a legal position leading to the submission. Evinger appealed the loss two weeks later and the Missouri athletic commission overturned the decision to a no contest.

=== Results ===
Main Card (UFC Fight Pass)
Weight class				Method	Round	Time	Notes
Bantamweight	Yana Kunitskaya	vs.	Tonya Evinger (c)	No Contest (overturned)	1	1:59	(Note: For the Invicta FC Bantamweight Championship)
Strawweight	Angela Hill (c)	def.	Kaline Medeiros	Decision (unanimous) (50-45, 49-46, 48-47)	5	5:00	(Note: For the Invicta FC Strawweight Championship)
Atomweight	Hérica Tibúrcio	def.	Simona Soukupova	Decision (unanimous) (29-28, 29-28, 29-28)	3	5:00
Catchweight (117 lbs)	Ashley Yoder	def.	Amber Brown	Submission (armbar)	2	2:31
Catchweight (140.6 lbs)	Pam Sorenson	def.	Jessica-Rose Clark	Decision (split) (30-27, 28-29, 30-27)	3	5:00
Strawweight	JJ Aldrich	def.	Lynn Alvarez	Decision (unanimous) (30-27, 30-27, 30-27)	3	5:00
Bantamweight	Alexa Conners	def.	Stephanie Egger	Decision (split) (29-28, 28-29, 29-28)	3	5:00
Catchweight (118.4 lbs)	Miranda Maverick	def.	Samantha Diaz	Submission (rear-naked choke)	1	4:26

=== Bonus awards ===
The following fighters were awarded monetary bonuses:

- Fight of the Night: Not awarded
- Performance of the Night: Yana Kunitskaya, Hérica Tibúrcio, JJ Aldrich, and Alexa Conners

== Invicta FC 19: Maia vs. Modafferi ==
Invicta FC 19: Maia vs. Modafferi
- Date: September 23, 2016
- Venue: Scottish Rite Temple
- City: Kansas City, Missouri

Event chronology
Invicta FC 18: Grasso vs. Esquibel	Invicta FC 19: Maia vs. Modafferi	Invicta FC 20: Evinger vs. Kunitskaya

Invicta FC 19: Maia vs. Modafferi was a mixed martial arts event that was headlined by Jennifer Maia defending her flyweight championship against Roxanne Modafferi. The event's co-main event featured atomweight champion Ayaka Hamasaki defending her title against top contender Jinh Yu Frey.

=== Results ===
Main Card (UFC Fight Pass)
Weight class				Method	Round	Time	Notes
Flyweight	Jennifer Maia (c)	def.	Roxanne Modafferi	Decision (split) (47-48, 48-47, 49-46)	5	5:00	(Note: For the Invicta FC Flyweight Championship)
Atomweight	Ayaka Hamasaki (c)	def.	Jinh Yu Frey	TKO (doctor stoppage)	2	4:38	(Note: For the Invicta FC Atomweight Championship)
Catchweight (138.5 lbs)	Irene Aldana	def.	Faith Van Duin	TKO (punches)	1	4:57
Strawweight	Kaline Medeiros	def.	Manjit Kolekar	Decision (unanimous) (30-27, 30-27, 29-28)	3	5:00
Strawweight	Kal Holliday	def.	Tiffany van Soest	Submission (rear-naked choke)	2	2:08
Atomweight	Julia Jones	def.	Stephanie Skinner	Submission (rear-naked choke)	1	2:38
Featherweight	Amber Leibrock	def.	Amy Coleman	TKO (knees and punches)	1	3:15
Strawweight	Sunna Davíðsdóttir	def.	Ashley Greenway	Decision (unanimous) (30-27, 30-27, 30-27)	3	5:00

=== Bonus awards ===
The following fighters were awarded monetary bonuses:

- Fight of the Night: Jennifer Maia vs. Roxanne Modafferi ($1,500 each)
- Performance of the Night: Irene Aldana and Julia Jones ($1,000 each)

== Invicta FC 18: Grasso vs. Esquibel ==
Invicta FC 18: Grasso vs. Esquibel
- Date: July 29, 2016
- Venue: Scottish Rite Temple
- City: Kansas City, Missouri

Event chronology
Invicta FC 17: Evinger vs. Schneider	Invicta FC 18: Grasso vs. Esquibel	Invicta FC 19: Maia vs. Modafferi

Invicta FC 18: Grasso vs. Esquibel was a mixed martial arts event headlined by a strawweight fight between undefeated Alexa Grasso and Jodie Esquibel. The winner of the main event is expected to receive the next strawweight title shot against champion Angela Hill. The original co-main event was to be Irene Aldana facing undefeated Brazilian fighter Taila Santos to determine who challenges Tonya Evinger next for the bantamweight championship, however VISA issues forced Santos off the card and the fight was removed. Lynn Alvarez was scheduled to fight undefeated Indian fighter Manjit Kolekar but VISA issues forced Kolekar off the card and she was replaced by Mizuki Inoue. Agnieszka Niedzwiedz was scheduled to fight Claudia Rey but Rey was also unable to make the event due to VISA issues and was replaced by Christine Stanley. Aldana, Rey, and Santos are now being scheduled for the next event.

=== Results ===
Main Card (UFC Fight Pass)
Weight class				Method	Round	Time	Notes
Strawweight	Alexa Grasso	def.	Jodie Esquibel	Decision (unanimous) (30-27, 30-27, 30-26)	3	5:00	(Note: Invicta FC Strawweight Championship Title Eliminator)
Catchweight (128.6 lbs)	Agnieszka Niedźwiedź	def.	Christine Stanley	Decision (unanimous) (30-27, 30-27, 30-27)	3	5:00
Strawweight	Mizuki Inoue	def.	Lynn Alvarez	Submission (armbar)	2	3:00
Bantamweight	Cindy Dandois	def.	Jessamyn Duke	Submission (armbar)	1	1:33
Featherweight	Megan Anderson	def.	Peggy Morgan	TKO (punches)	1	4:09
Atomweight	Tessa Simpson	def.	Simona Soukupova	Decision (unanimous) (29-28, 29-28, 29-27)	3	5:00
Catchweight (138.1 lbs)	Aspen Ladd	def.	Jessica Hoy	TKO (punches)	2	3:14
Bantamweight	Sijara Eubanks	def.	Amberlynn Orr	TKO (punches)	1	4:41

=== Bonus awards ===
The following fighters were awarded monetary bonuses:

- Fight of the Night: Tessa Simpson vs. Simona Soukupova ($1,500 each)
- Performance of the Night: Alexa Grasso and Megan Anderson ($1,000 each)

== Invicta FC 17: Evinger vs. Schneider ==
Invicta FC 17: Evinger vs. Schneider
- Date: May 7, 2016
- Venue: OC Fair & Event Center
- City: Costa Mesa, California

Event chronology
Invicta FC 16: Hamasaki vs. Brown	Invicta FC 17: Evinger vs. Schneider	Invicta FC 18: Grasso vs. Esquibel

Invicta FC 17: Evinger vs. Schneider was a mixed martial arts event that was headlined by an Invicta FC Bantamweight Championship bout as champion Tonya Evinger defends against Colleen Schneider. The co-main event will feature Lívia Renata Souza defending her Invicta FC Strawweight Championship against Angela Hill. Aline Serrio was scheduled to fight Mizuki Inoue but Mizuki was replaced by Kaline Medeiros due to an injury in training. An atomweight bout between newcomers Tessa Simpson and Julia Jones was scheduled but removed from the card on the week of the event.

=== Results ===
Main Card (UFC Fight Pass)
Weight class				Method	Round	Time	Notes
Bantamweight	Tonya Evinger (c)	def.	Colleen Schneider	Decision (unanimous) (49-45, 50-44, 50-44)	5	5:00	(Note: For the Invicta FC Bantamweight Championship)
Strawweight	Angela Hill	def.	Lívia Renata Souza (c)	Decision (split) (48-47, 47-48, 48-47)	5	5:00	(Note: For the Invicta FC Strawweight Championship)
Featherweight	Charmaine Tweet	def.	Latoya Walker	KO (spinning back fist and punches)	1	3:41
Strawweight	Kaline Medeiros	def.	Aline Serio	TKO (punches)	2	4:04
Featherweight	Megan Anderson	def.	Amanda Bell	TKO (head kick and punches)	1	5:00
Flyweight	Christine Stanley	def.	Shannon Sinn	Decision (unanimous) (30-27, 30-27, 29-28)	3	5:00
Flyweight	Rachael Ostovich	def.	Ariel Beck	Decision (split) (29-28, 28-29, 29-28)	3	5:00
Bantamweight	Laura Howarth	def.	Alexa Conners	Decision (split) (29-28, 28-29, 29-28)	3	5:00

=== Bonus awards ===
The following fighters were awarded monetary bonuses:

- Fight of the Night: Rachael Ostovich vs. Ariel Beck ($1,500 each)
- Performance of the Night: Angela Hill and Megan Anderson ($1,000 each)

== Invicta FC 16: Hamasaki vs. Brown ==
Invicta FC 16: Hamasaki vs. Brown
- Date: March 11, 2016
- Venue: Trinidad Pavilion
- City: Las Vegas, Nevada

Event chronology
Invicta FC 15: Cyborg vs. Ibragimova	Invicta FC 16: Hamasaki vs. Brown	Invicta FC 17: Evinger vs. Schneider

Invicta FC 16: Hamasaki vs. Brown was a mixed martial arts event that was headlined by an Invicta FC Atomweight Championship bout as champion Ayaka Hamasaki defended against Amber Brown. The co-main event will crown an interim flyweight champion in a fight between Vanessa Porto and Jennifer Maia while reigning champion Barb Honchak takes time off. The event was scheduled to feature the return of Alexa Grasso against Stephanie Eggink, however Grasso broke her hand a week before the event and was replaced by Angela Hill. Amberlynn Orr was set to debut against Kelly McGill but Orr was forced to pull out as well due to an injury and was replaced by Aspen Ladd.

=== Results ===
Main Card (UFC Fight Pass)
Weight class				Method	Round	Time	Notes
Atomweight	Ayaka Hamasaki (c)	def.	Amber Brown	Submission (armbar)	3	2:52	(Note: For the Invicta FC Atomweight Championship)
Flyweight	Jennifer Maia	def.	Vanessa Porto	Decision (unanimous) (49-46, 48-47, 48-47)	5	5:00	(Note: For the interim Invicta FC Flyweight Championship)
Strawweight	Angela Hill	def.	Stephanie Eggink	TKO (punches)	2	2:36
Catchweight (136.6 lbs)	Irene Aldana	def.	Jessamyn Duke	TKO (punches)	1	3:08
Flyweight	Roxanne Modafferi	def.	DeAnna Bennett	Decision (split) (29-28, 28-29, 29-28)	3	5:00
Catchweight (106.9 lbs)	Jinh Yu Frey	def.	Herica Tiburcio	Decision (unanimous) (30-27, 30-27, 29-28)	3	5:00
Flyweight	Sarah D'Alelio	def.	Andrea Lee	Submission (rear-naked choke)	3	4:21
Bantamweight	Aspen Ladd	def.	Kelly McGill	TKO (strikes)	3	1:47
Strawweight	Ashley Greenway	def.	Sarah Click	Decision (unanimous) (30-26, 29-28, 29-28)	3	5:00

=== Bonus awards ===
The following fighters were awarded monetary bonuses:

- Fight of the Night: Jennifer Maia vs. Vanessa Porto ($1,500 each) and Sarah D’Alelio vs. Andrea Lee ($1,500 each)
- Performance of the Night: Angela Hill ($1,000 each)

== Invicta FC 15: Cyborg vs. Ibragimova ==
Invicta FC 15: Cyborg vs. Ibragimova
- Date: January 16, 2016
- Venue: OC Fair & Event Center
- City: Costa Mesa, California

Event chronology
Invicta FC 14: Evinger vs. Kianzad	Invicta FC 15: Cyborg vs. Ibragimova	Invicta FC 16: Hamasaki vs. Brown

Invicta FC 15: Cyborg vs. Ibragimova was a mixed martial arts event that was headlined by an Invicta FC Featherweight Championship bout with champion Cris Cyborg defending against Russian newcomer Daria Ibragimova. The event was originally scheduled to feature Cyborg dropping down in weight but it was later decided that she would remain at 145 and defend her championship. The co-main event will feature an Invicta FC Strawweight Championship bout with champion Lívia Renata Souza defending her title against undefeated challenger DeAnna Bennett. Souza was originally scheduled again to fight Alexa Grasso but it was announced on November 3 that Grasso had suffered an injury. Raquel Pa'aluhi was scheduled to fight Irene Aldana but Aldana was replaced by Colleen Schneider. Angela Hill was scheduled to fight Jodie Esquibel, but Esquibel was replaced by Alida Gray. Amber Brown was scheduled to fight Lisa Ellis, while Christine Stanley was scheduled to fight Shannon Sinn but on the week of the event, Ellis and Sinn pulled out and were replaced by Katy Collins and Shino VanHoose. Two days later, Collins also pulled out due to an injury in training leading to her fight with Christine Stanley being scrapped from the event. A fight between Ediane Gomes and Amanda Bell was scheduled but scrapped the day before the event after Gomes suffered complications with her weight cut. This event was first planned for November and then December before being set for January.

=== Results ===
Main Card (UFC Fight Pass)
Weight class				Method	Round	Time	Notes
Featherweight	Cris Cyborg (c)	def.	Daria Ibragimova	KO (punches)	1	4:58	(Note: For the Invicta FC Featherweight Championship)
Strawweight	Lívia Renata Souza (c)	def.	DeAnna Bennett	TKO (body kick and punches)	1	1:30	(Note: For the Invicta FC Strawweight Championship)
Catchweight (136.2 lbs)	Colleen Schneider	def.	Raquel Pa'aluhi	Decision (split) (29-28, 28-29, 29-28)	3	5:00
Atomweight	Amber Brown	def.	Shino VanHoose	Submission (guillotine choke)	1	2:36
Strawweight	Mizuki Inoue	def.	Lacey Schuckman	Submission (armbar)	3	3:41
Strawweight	Angela Hill	def.	Alida Gray	TKO (knee to the body)	1	1:39
Featherweight	Megan Anderson	def.	Amber Leibrock	TKO (knees and punches)	3	2:33

=== Bonus awards ===
The following fighters were awarded monetary bonuses:

- Fight of the Night: Megan Anderson vs. Amber Leibrock ($1,500 each)
- Performance of the Night: Lívia Renata Souza, Mizuki Inoue and Angela Hill ($1,000 each)

== Invicta FC 14: Evinger vs. Kianzad ==
Invicta FC 14: Evinger vs. Kianzad
- Date: September 12, 2015
- Venue: Municipal Auditorium
- City: Kansas City, Missouri

Event chronology
Invicta FC 13: Cyborg vs. Van Duin	Invicta FC 14: Evinger vs. Kianzad	Invicta FC 15: Cyborg vs. Ibragimova

Invicta FC 14: Evinger vs. Kianzad was a mixed martial arts event that took place on September 12, 2015. It was originally expected to be headlined by an Invicta FC Strawweight Championship bout between current champion Lívia Renata Souza and undefeated top contender Alexa Grasso, however Grasso was forced to withdraw due to injury. Invicta FC Bantamweight Champion Tonya Evinger was to defend her bantamweight title when she takes on Swedish fighter Pannie Kianzad in a contest originally scheduled as the co-main event. The day before the event, both fighters weighed in over the weight limit so the fight was changed to a non-title bout. JJ Aldrich was scheduled to fight Daniela Kortmann but Kortmann pulled out due to visa issues and was replaced by Rosa Acevedo.

=== Results ===
Main Card (UFC Fight Pass)
Weight class				Method	Round	Time	Notes
Catchweight (136.7 lbs)	Tonya Evinger	def.	Pannie Kianzad	TKO (punches)	2	3:34
Catchweight (117.4 lbs)	DeAnna Bennett	def.	Katja Kankaanpää	Decision (unanimous) (29-28, 29-28, 29-28)	3	5:00
Flyweight	Roxanne Modafferi	def.	Mariana Morais	TKO (punches)	3	4:40
Flyweight	Andrea Lee	def.	Rachael Ostovich	Verbal Submission (armbar)	3	4:58
Featherweight	Cindy Dandois	def.	Megan Anderson	Submission (triangle choke)	2	2:41
Preliminary Card (UFC Fight Pass)
Strawweight	Sharon Jacobson	def.	Jamie Moyle	Decision (unanimous) (30-27, 30-27, 29-28)	3	5:00
Atomweight	Jinh Yu Frey	def.	Liz McCarthy	Decision (unanimous) (30-27, 29-28, 29-28)	3	5:00
Catchweight (118.2 lbs)	JJ Aldrich	def.	Rosa Acevedo	KO (knee and punches)	1	2:24
Flyweight	Aspen Ladd	def.	Amanda Bobby Cooper	Submission (armbar)	2	4:42
Lightweight	Felicia Spencer	def.	Rachel Wiley	TKO (strikes)	1	3:32

=== Bonus awards ===
The following fighters were awarded monetary bonuses:

- Fight of the Night: Sharon Jacobson vs. Jamie Moyle
- Performance of the Night: Tonya Evinger, Andrea Lee, and JJ Aldrich

== Invicta FC 13: Cyborg vs. Van Duin ==
Invicta FC 13: Cyborg vs. Van Duin
- Date: July 9, 2015
- Venue: Cosmopolitan of Las Vegas
- City: Las Vegas, Nevada

Event chronology
Invicta FC 12: Kankaanpää vs. Souza	Invicta FC 13: Cyborg vs. Van Duin	Invicta FC 14: Evinger vs. Kianzad

Invicta FC 13: Cyborg vs. Van Duin was a mixed martial arts event headlined by an Invicta FC Featherweight Championship bout between current champion Cris Cyborg and top contender Faith Van Duin.

The co-main event featured a bout for the vacant Invicta FC Bantamweight Championship between top contenders Tonya Evinger and Irene Aldana.

The event featured an Invicta FC Atomweight Championship bout between current champion Hérica Tibúrcio and top contender Ayaka Hamasaki.

=== Results ===
Main Card (UFC Fight Pass)
Weight class				Method	Round	Time	Notes
Featherweight	Cris Cyborg (c)	def.	Faith Van Duin	TKO (knee to the body and punches)	1	0:45	(Note: For the Invicta FC Featherweight Championship.)
Bantamweight	Tonya Evinger	def.	Irene Aldana	TKO (punches)	4	4:38	(Note: For the vacant Invicta FC Bantamweight Championship.)
Atomweight	Ayaka Hamasaki	def.	Hérica Tibúrcio (c)	Decision (split) (47-48, 48-47, 49-46)	5	5:00	(Note: For the Invicta FC Atomweight Championship.)
Bantamweight	Pannie Kianzad	def.	Jessica-Rose Clark	Decision (unanimous) (30-27, 30-27, 30-27)	3	5:00
Atomweight	Amber Brown	def.	Catherine Costigan	Submission (rear-naked choke)	1	3:34
Strawweight	Jamie Moyle	def.	Amy Montenegro	Decision (split) (29-28, 28-29, 29-28)	3	5:00
Featherweight	Amber Leibrock	def.	Marina Shafir	KO (punches)	1	0:37

=== Bonus awards ===
The following fighters were awarded monetary bonuses:

- Fight of the Night: Jamie Moyle vs. Amy Montenegro
- Performance of the Night: Cris Cyborg and Amber Leibrock

== Invicta FC 12: Kankaanpää vs. Souza ==
Invicta FC 12: Kankaanpää vs. Souza
- Date: April 24, 2015
- Venue: Municipal Auditorium
- City: Kansas City, Missouri

Event chronology
Invicta FC 11: Cyborg vs. Tweet	Invicta FC 12: Kankaanpää vs. Souza	Invicta FC 13: Cyborg vs. Van Duin

Invicta FC 12: Kankaanpää vs. Souza was a mixed martial-arts event held April 24, 2015, headlined by Katja Kankaanpää defending her strawweight championship against Lívia Renata Souza.

Sijara Eubanks was scheduled to fight Roma Pawelek but Pawlek pulled out due to injury the week of the event and was replaced by Gina Begley.

A fight between Cassie Rodish and Stephanie Skinner was originally scheduled but Skinner suffered an injury on the week of the show and the fight was pulled from the event.

=== Results ===
Main Card (UFC Fight Pass)
Weight class				Method	Round	Time	Notes
Strawweight	Lívia Renata Souza	def.	Katja Kankaanpää (c)	Submission (triangle choke)	4	3:58	(Note: For the Invicta FC Strawweight Championship)
Flyweight	Vanessa Porto	def.	Roxanne Modafferi	Decision (unanimous) (30-27, 30-27, 30-27)	3	5:00
Featherweight	Faith Van Duin	def.	Amanda Bell	Submission (rear-naked choke)	2	0:38	(Note: Invicta FC Featherweight title eliminator)
Bantamweight	Raquel Pa'aluhi	def.	Ediane Gomes	Decision (unanimous) (29-28, 29-28, 29-28)	3	5:00
Preliminary Card
Featherweight	Latoya Walker	def.	Peggy Morgan	Decision (unanimous) (30-27, 30-27, 30-27)	3	5:00
Strawweight	Lacey Schuckman	def.	Jenny Liou	TKO (punches)	1	1:53
Strawweight	Sharon Jacobson	def.	Delaney Owen	Decision (unanimous) (30-27, 30-27, 30-27)	3	5:00
Flyweight	Shannon Sinn	def.	Maureen Riordon	Decision (unanimous) (30-27, 29-28, 29-28)	3	5:00
Bantamweight	Sijara Eubanks	def.	Gina Begley	TKO (punches)	1	4:59

=== Bonus awards ===
The following fighters were awarded monetary bonuses:

- Fight of the Night: Raquel Pa'aluhi vs. Ediane Gomes ($1,500 each) and Sharon Jacobson vs. Delaney Owen ($1,500 each)
- Performance of the Night: Lívia Renata Souza and Faith Van Duin ($1,000 each)

== Invicta FC 11: Cyborg vs. Tweet ==
Invicta FC 11: Cyborg vs. Tweet
- Date: February 27, 2015
- Venue: Shrine Expo Hall
- City: Los Angeles, California

Event chronology
Invicta FC 10: Waterson vs. Tiburcio	Invicta FC 11: Cyborg vs. Tweet	Invicta FC 12: Kankaanpää vs. Souza

Invicta FC 11: Cyborg vs. Tweet is a mixed-martial events that took place on February 27, 2015. The event was headlined by Cris Cyborg defending her featherweight championship against Charmaine Tweet. Christine Stanley was scheduled to face Emily Corso but Corso withdrew due to injury on January 30 and was replaced by Rachael Cummins. Two days before the event, Cummins withdrew due to suffering an injury in training and was replaced at the last minute by Laura Salazar. DeAnna Bennett was scheduled to face Lynn Alvarez but Alvarez withdrew due to injury on February 11 and was replaced by Norma Rueda Center. Irene Aldana was to face Melanie LaCroix but Melanie withdrew due to injury as well and was replaced by Colleen Schneider

=== Results ===
Main Card (UFC Fight Pass)
Weight class				Method	Round	Time	Notes
Featherweight	Cris Cyborg (c)	def.	Charmaine Tweet	TKO (punches)	1	0:46	(Note: For the Invicta FC Featherweight Championship)
Strawweight	Alexa Grasso	def.	Mizuki Inoue	Decision (unanimous) (30-26, 29-28, 29-28)	3	5:00
Catchweight (116.8 lbs)	DeAnna Bennett	def.	Norma Rueda Center	Decision (unanimous) (30-27, 29-28, 29-28)	3	5:00
Bantamweight	Irene Aldana	def.	Colleen Schneider	Submission (rear-naked choke)	1	1:05
Preliminary Card
Strawweight	Jamie Moyle	def.	J.J. Aldrich	Technical Submission (rear-naked choke)	1	2:20
Strawweight	Amy Montenegro	def.	Brianna Van Buren	Decision (unanimous) (30-27, 29-28, 29-28)	3	5:00
Catchweight (128.9 lbs)	Christine Stanley	def.	Laura Salazar	TKO (punches)	1	2:59
Flyweight	Aspen Ladd	def.	Ana Carolina Vidal	TKO (punches and elbows)	1	4:21

=== Bonus awards ===
The following fighters were awarded monetary bonuses:

- Fight of the Night: Alexa Grasso vs. Mizuki Inoue
- Performance of the Night: Cris Cyborg and Irene Aldana

== Invicta FC 10: Waterson vs. Tiburcio ==
Invicta FC 10: Waterson vs. Tiburcio
- Date: December 5, 2014
- Venue: Arena Theater
- City: Houston, Texas

Event chronology
Invicta FC 9: Honchak vs. Hashi	Invicta FC 10: Waterson vs. Tiburcio	Invicta FC 11: Cyborg vs. Tweet

Invicta FC 10: Waterson vs. Tiburcio is a mixed martial arts event that took place on December 5, 2014. It was announced that Cris Cyborg would return and drop down in weight to bantamweight. However at Invicta FC 9, it was announced that Justino suffered an injury that forced her off the card. As a result, the new main event was announced to be atomweight champion Michelle Waterson defending her championship against Hérica Tibúrcio. The fight between Roxanne Modafferi and Vanessa Porto was expected to determine who gets the next title shot against Barb Honchak. On November 20, Porto was removed from the card due to visa issues and was replaced by Andrea Lee. A bantamweight bout between Irene Aldana and Marion Reneau was scheduled to take place but four days before the event, Aldana was hospitalized with bronchitis and it was announced that the fight would be postponed. On December 3, the fight between Charmaine Tweet and Faith Van Duin was pulled from the event due to medical concerns.

=== Results ===
Main Card
Weight class				Method	Round	Time	Notes
Atomweight	Hérica Tibúrcio	def.	Michelle Waterson (c)	Submission (guillotine choke)	3	1:04	(Note: For the Invicta FC Atomweight Championship)
Bantamweight	Tonya Evinger	def.	Cindy Dandois	Submission (armbar)	2	1:23
Flyweight	Roxanne Modafferi	def.	Andrea Lee	Decision (split) (29-28, 28-29, 30-27)	3	5:00
Flyweight	DeAnna Bennett	def.	Jennifer Maia	Decision (unanimous) (30-27, 29-28, 29-28)	3	5:00
Preliminary Card
Featherweight	Peggy Morgan	def.	Andria Wawro	Decision (unanimous) (30-27, 30-27, 29-28)	3	5:00
Strawweight	Alexa Grasso	def.	Alida Gray	TKO (punches)	1	1:47
Atomweight	Jinh Yu Frey	def.	Cassie Robb	Submission (rear-naked choke)	1	2:36
Flyweight	Rachael Ostovich	def.	Evva Johnson	Decision (split) (28-29, 29-28, 29-28)	3	5:00

=== Bonus awards ===
The following fighters were awarded monetary bonuses:

- Fight of the Night: Hérica Tibúrcio vs. Michelle Waterson ($1,500 each)
- Performance of the Night: Hérica Tibúrcio and Alexa Grasso ($1,000 each)

== Invicta FC 9: Honchak vs. Hashi ==
Invicta FC 9: Honchak vs. Hashi
- Date: November 1, 2014
- Venue: RiverCenter
- City: Davenport, Iowa

Event chronology
Invicta FC 8: Waterson vs. Tamada	Invicta FC 9: Honchak vs. Hashi	Invicta FC 10: Waterson vs. Tiburcio

Invicta FC 9: Honchak vs. Hashi was a mixed martial-arts event that took place on November 1, 2014

Background

Invicta FC 9 was headlined by Barb Honchak defending her flyweight championship against Takayo Hashi. The co-main event was Mizuki Inoue against Karolina Kowalkiewicz.

Kaitlin Young was originally scheduled to fight Cindy Dandois but Dandois was forced to withdraw due to visa issues and was replaced by Raquel Pa'aluhi.

Herica Tiburcio vs. Ayaka Hamasaki has been scratched from this Invicta FC 9 event, as visa issues for Tiburcio have forced the 22-year-old Brazilian off the card at the last minute.

=== Results ===
Main Card (UFC Fight Pass)
Weight class				Method	Round	Time	Notes
Flyweight	Barb Honchak (c)	def.	Takayo Hashi	Decision (unanimous) (49-46, 50-45, 50-45)	5	5:00	(Note: For the Invicta FC Flyweight Championship)
Strawweight	Karolina Kowalkiewicz	def.	Mizuki Inoue	Decision (split) (28-29, 29-28, 29-28)	3	5:00
Featherweight	Raquel Pa'aluhi	def.	Kaitlin Young	Decision (unanimous) (29-28, 29-28, 29-28)	3	5:00
Atomweight	Jodie Esquibel	def.	Nicdali Rivera-Calanoc	Decision (unanimous) (30-27, 30-27, 30-27)	3	5:00
Atomweight	Amber Brown	def.	Liz McCarthy	Decision (split) (29-28, 28-29, 30-27)	3	5:00
Preliminary Card
Lightweight	Amanda Bell	def.	Maria Hougaard Djursaa	TKO (punches)	1	4:56
Flyweight	Andrea Lee	def.	Shannon Sinn	Decision (unanimous) (30-27, 30-27, 30-27)	3	5:00
Strawweight	Jamie Moyle	def.	Jenny Liou Shriver	Decision (unanimous) (30-27, 30-27, 30-27)	3	5:00
Featherweight	Kelly McGill	def.	Maegan Goodwin	Decision (unanimous) (30-27, 29-28, 29-28)	3	5:00

=== Bonus awards ===
The following fighters were awarded monetary bonuses:

- Fight of the Night: Karolina Kowalkiewicz vs. Mizuki Inoue
- Performance of the Night: Raquel Pa'aluhi and Jamie Moyle

== Invicta FC 8: Waterson vs. Tamada ==
Invicta FC 8: Waterson vs. Tamada
- Date: September 6, 2014
- Venue: Municipal Auditorium
- City: Kansas City, Missouri, United States

Event chronology
Invicta FC 7: Honchak vs. Smith	Invicta FC 8: Waterson vs. Tamada	Invicta FC 9: Honchak vs. Hashi

Invicta FC 8: Waterson vs. Tamada was a mixed martial-arts event that took place on September 6, 2014.

Background

Invicta FC 8 was the first Invicta event to be broadcast on UFC's Fight Pass as part of the new deal between Invicta and UFC.

Invicta FC 8 was headlined by Michelle Waterson defending her atomweight championship against Yasuko Tamada along with a co-main event of Stephanie Eggink vs. Katja Kankaanpää for the vacant strawweight championship. The event also featured the third fight between Roxanne Modafferi and Tara LaRosa. After the event, the co-main event of Katja Kankaanpää vs. Stephanie Eggink was awarded Fight of the Night.

=== Results ===
Main Card (UFC Fight Pass)
Weight class				Method	Round	Time	Notes
Atomweight	Michelle Waterson (c)	def.	Yasuko Tamada	TKO (knee & punches)	3	4:58	(Note: For the Invicta FC Atomweight Championship)
Strawweight	Katja Kankaanpää	def.	Stephanie Eggink	Submission (D'Arce choke)	5	2:03	(Note: For the vacant Invicta FC Strawweight Championship)
Bantamweight	Tonya Evinger	def.	Ediane Gomes	Submission (armbar)	1	3:31
Flyweight	Roxanne Modafferi	def.	Tara LaRosa	Decision (unanimous) (30-27, 30-27, 29-28)	3	5:00
Flyweight	DeAnna Bennett	def.	Michelle Ould	TKO (liver kick)	2	1:34
Lightweight	Charmaine Tweet	def.	Veronica Rothenhausler	TKO (punches)	1	4:05
Preliminary Card
Bantamweight	Irene Aldana	def.	Peggy Morgan	Submission (rear-naked choke)	1	2:50
Strawweight	Alexa Grasso	def.	Ashley Cummins	Decision (unanimous) (30-27, 29-28, 29-28)	3	5:00
Atomweight	Jodie Esquibel	def.	Jinh Yu Frey	Decision (split) (28-29, 29-28, 29-27)	3	5:00
Strawweight	JJ Aldrich	def.	Delaney Owen	Decision (unanimous) (30-27, 30-27, 30-26)	3	5:00

=== Bonus awards ===
The following fighters were awarded monetary bonuses:

- Fight of the Night: Katja Kankaanpää vs. Stephanie Eggink
- Performance of the Night: Irene Aldana and Tonya Evinger

== Invicta FC 7: Honchak vs. Smith ==
Invicta FC 7: Honchak vs. Smith
- Date: December 7, 2013
- Venue: Ameristar Casino Kansas City
- City: Kansas City, Missouri, United States

Event chronology
Invicta FC 6: Coenen vs. Cyborg	Invicta FC 7: Honchak vs. Smith	Invicta FC 8: Waterson vs. Tamada

Invicta FC 7: Honchak vs. Smith was a mixed martial-arts event that took place on December 7, 2013.

Background

The first announced fight saw Carla Esparza defend her strawweight championship against undefeated Cláudia Gadelha. The main event was announced to be Barb Honchak defending her flyweight championship against Leslie Smith. A third title fight took place as Lauren Murphy faced Miriam Nakamoto to crown the first Invicta FC Bantamweight Champion. The event also featured debuts of several fighters including Felice Herrig and Tonya Evinger.

Kelly Kobold was also scheduled to make her debut against Tonya Evinger, but Kobold pulled out of the fight on November 22 due to injury and was replaced by Sarah D'Alelio.

Carla Esparza was due to defend her strawweight title against Cláudia Gadelha, but Gadelha was taken to hospital with a bacterial infection and the bout was cancelled.

Like IFC 6, IFC 7 was available as a regular Pay-Per-View and also as an Internet Pay-Per-View. The event was also available in High Definition PPV for a higher price, typically $10 more.), but the Internet Pay-Per-View hosting moved from Ustream to DaCast.

After the event, the main event of Barb Honchak vs. Leslie Smith was awarded Fight of the Night while Nina Ansaroff earned Knockout of the Night.

=== Results ===
Main Card
Weight class				Method	Round	Time	Notes
Flyweight	Barb Honchak (c)	def.	Leslie Smith	Decision (unanimous) (49-46, 49-46, 49-46)	5	5:00	(Note: For the Invicta FC Flyweight Championship)
Bantamweight	Lauren Murphy	def.	Miriam Nakamoto	TKO (injury)	4	0:23	(Note: For the inaugural Invicta FC Bantamweight Championship)
Strawweight	Tecia Torres	def.	Felice Herrig	Decision (unanimous) (30-27, 30-27, 30-27)	3	5:00
Strawweight	Joanne Calderwood	def.	Katja Kankaanpää	Decision (unanimous) (29-28, 29-28, 29-28)	3	5:00
Featherweight	Julia Budd	def.	Charmaine Tweet	Decision (unanimous) (30-27, 30-27, 30-27)	3	5:00
Flyweight	Vanessa Porto	def.	Zoila Frausto Gurgel	Decision (unanimous) (30-27, 29-28, 29-28)	3	5:00
Preliminary Card
Bantamweight	Tonya Evinger	def.	Sarah D'Alelio	Decision (unanimous) (29-28, 29-28, 29-28)	3	5:00
Catchweight (127 lbs.)	Nina Ansaroff	def.	Munah Holland	TKO (punches)	2	3:54

=== Bonus awards ===
The following fighters were awarded monetary bonuses:

- Fight of the Night: Barb Honchak vs. Leslie Smith ($1,500 each)
- Knockout of the Night: Nina Ansaroff ($1,000)

== Invicta FC 6: Coenen vs. Cyborg ==
Invicta FC 6: Coenen vs. Cyborg
- Date: July 13, 2013
- Venue: Ameristar Casino Kansas City
- City: Kansas City, Missouri, United States

Event chronology
Invicta FC 5: Penne vs. Waterson	Invicta FC 6: Coenen vs. Cyborg	Invicta FC 7: Honchak vs. Smith

Invicta FC 6: Coenen vs. Cyborg was a mixed martial arts event held on 13 July 2013. The event was headlined by Marloes Coenen vs Cris Cyborg to crown the first Invicta FC Featherweight Champion. It has been stated that the winner between Leslie Smith and Jennifer Maia will get a title shot against Flyweight Champion Barb Honchak. The fight between Charmaine Tweet and Ediane Gomes will determine who will be the first to get a title shot against the winner of the Featherweight Championship Main Event.

The event aired on cable and satellite pay-per-view in the United States and Canada in addition to their online PPV stream, as the promotion has come to a deal with Integrated Sports Media for live viewing at 9:00 p.m. ET – 6:00 p.m. PT on both cable and satellite pay-per-view via iN Demand, DISH, Avail-TVN in the United States and Bell TV in Canada, for a suggested retail price of $14.95. The event was also available as an Internet Pay-per-View for $14.95 from Ustream.

Livia von Plettenberg was scheduled to fight Laura Sanko but Sanko withdrew from the fight on April 26 due to pregnancy. She was replaced by Cassie Robb. On June 4, Carla Esparza withdrew from her Strawweight title defense due to a knee injury and was replaced by Cláudia Gadelha, who was originally scheduled to fight Joanne Calderwood. Calderwood was then matched up against Sarah Schneider. On June 23, Schneider also withdrew due to injury and was replaced by Norma Rueda Center. On June 26, Julia Budd withdrew from her fight against Ediane Gomes due to injury and was replaced by Charmaine Tweet. However, on July 10, Tweet announced that she was unable to make the fight due to visa issues and she was replaced by Tamikka Brents just three days before the event in what was to be a catchweight fight at 150 lbs. Brents weighed in 5 pounds over so the fight was made a lightweight fight. On July 12, the day before the event at the weigh-ins, it was announced that Veronica Rothenhausler was deemed medically unable to compete after passing out due to her weight cut thus canceling her planned fight with Mollie Estes although Estes did still receive her fight purse. The planned fight between Cassie Robb and Livia von Plettenberg was also canceled due to von Plettenberg failing to make the weight limit. Due to this, a new fight was made between Livia von Plettenberg and Kathina Catron. During the event, it was announced that Tamikka Brents suffered an injury, canceling her fight with Ediane Gomes.

After the event, fight of the night was awarded to Leslie Smith & Jennifer Maia. Jessica Penne received the submission of the night bonus while knockout of the night went to Miriam Nakamoto.

=== Results ===
Main Card
Weight class				Method	Round	Time	Notes
Featherweight	Cris Cyborg	def.	Marloes Coenen	TKO (punches)	4	4:02	(Note: For the inaugural Invicta FC Featherweight Championship)
Strawweight	Cláudia Gadelha	def.	Ayaka Hamasaki	TKO (punches)	3	3:58	(Note: Invicta FC Strawweight title eliminator. Gadelha was docked a point for an illegal knee.)
Bantamweight	Lauren Taylor	def.	Sarah D'Alelio	Decision (unanimous) (30-27, 29-28, 29-28)	3	5:00
Flyweight	Leslie Smith	def.	Jennifer Maia	Decision (unanimous) (30-27, 30-27, 29-28)	3	5:00	(Note: Invicta FC Flyweight title eliminator)
Atomweight	Jessica Penne	def.	Nicdali Rivera-Calanoc	Submission (rear naked choke)	1	4:57
Strawweight	Joanne Calderwood	def.	Norma Rueda Center	Decision (unanimous) (30-27, 29-28, 29-28)	3	5:00
Strawweight	Mizuki Inoue	def.	Bec Hyatt	Decision (unanimous) (29-28, 29-28, 29-28)	3	5:00
Bantamweight	Miriam Nakamoto	def.	Duda Yankovich	TKO (knee and punches)	1	2:08
Strawweight	Tecia Torres	def.	Rose Namajunas	Decision (unanimous) (30-27, 29-28, 29-28)	3	5:00
Preliminary Card
Strawweight	Emily Kagan	def.	Ashley Cummins	Decision (split) (30-27, 28-29, 30-27)	3	5:00
Flyweight	Livia von Plettenberg	def.	Kathina Catron	Decision (unanimous) (30-27, 29-28, 29-28)	3	5:00

=== Bonus awards ===
The following fighters were awarded monetary bonuses:

- Fight of the Night: Leslie Smith vs. Jennifer Maia
- Knockout of the Night: Miriam Nakamoto
- Submission of the Night: Jessica Penne

== Invicta FC 5: Penne vs. Waterson ==
Invicta FC 5: Penne vs. Waterson
- Date: April 5, 2013
- Venue: Ameristar Casino Kansas City
- City: Kansas City, Missouri, United States

Event chronology
Invicta FC 4: Esparza vs. Hyatt	Invicta FC 5: Penne vs. Waterson	Invicta FC 6: Cyborg vs. Coenen

Invicta FC 5: Penne vs. Waterson was a mixed martial arts event held on April 5, 2013. Shannon Knapp announced during Invicta FC 4 that the event would be headlined by a co-main event of Jessica Penne defending her Invicta FC Atomweight Championship against Michelle Waterson along with a flyweight championship bout between Vanessa Porto and Barb Honchak and that Sarah Kaufman would make her Invicta debut on the show. The show was originally targeted for April 13, however Knapp announced they would change it to April 5 after the UFC announced a show on that date.

On February 5, 2013 it was announced that Invicta FC had signed Zoila Frausto Gurgel and she would make her debut at Invicta FC against Jennifer Maia.

On February 15, 2013, Shannon Knapp announced that Invicta FC had signed Cris Cyborg to debut at Invicta 5 against Ediane Gomes. The signing was notable because it was the first professional bout for Santos since her suspension in December 2011 while competing in the now-defunct Strikeforce organization. The winner of the fight will face Marloes Coenen at Invicta FC 6 to crown the first Invicta FC Featherweight Champion. Gomes was originally scheduled to fight Julia Budd but was moved when Santos was signed. Budd was instead booked to face Fiona Muxlow. On March 19, 2013, Ediane Gomes suffered an injury and was forced to withdraw from the fight with Santos. As a result, Fiona Muxlow was moved to fight Santos and Budd was matched against another new opponent in Mollie Estes. Mollie's original opponent was Veronica Rothenhausler, but Veronica suffered an injury and was dropped from the card allowing Estes to be moved into the fight with Budd.

A fight between River Jones and Lauren Barefoot was originally scheduled to take place on the preliminary card but was canceled when Jones suffered an injury. Cassie Rodish was originally scheduled to fight Nicdali Rivera-Calanoc but Nicdali was forced to withdraw due to injury on March 11 and she was replaced by Simona Soukupova. Kaitlin Young was set to fight Amanda Nunes, but Nunes suffered an arm injury in training and was replaced by Lauren Taylor.

After the event, fight of the night went to Sarah Kaufman and Leslie Smith. Submission of the night went to Rose Namajunas and knockout of the night went to Miriam Nakamoto. Additionally, Bec Hyatt and Jessica Penne both received social media bonuses for promoting the event.

The event was the first successful Internet Pay-Per-View for Invicta, broadcast for $9.95 by Ustream.

=== Results ===
Main Card
Weight class				Method	Round	Time	Notes
Atomweight	Michelle Waterson	def.	Jessica Penne (c)	Submission (armbar)	4	2:31	(Note: For the Invicta FC Atomweight Championship)
Flyweight	Barb Honchak	def.	Vanessa Porto	Decision (unanimous) (50–45, 49–47, 48–46)	5	5:00	(Note: For the inaugural Invicta FC Flyweight Championship)
Featherweight	Cris Cyborg	def.	Fiona Muxlow	TKO (strikes)	1	3:46
Bantamweight	Sarah Kaufman	def.	Leslie Smith	Decision (split) (29–28, 28–29, 29–28)	3	5:00
Flyweight	Jennifer Maia	def.	Zoila Frausto Gurgel	Decision (unanimous) (30–27, 29–28, 29–28)	3	5:00
Bantamweight	Lauren Taylor	def.	Kaitlin Young	Decision (unanimous) (29–28, 29–28, 29–28)	3	5:00
Featherweight	Julia Budd	def.	Mollie Estes	Submission (rear-naked choke)	3	1:04
Strawweight	Bec Hyatt	def.	Jasminka Cive	Submission (armbar)	1	3:30
Preliminary Card
Atomweight	Simona Soukupova	def.	Cassie Rodish	Submission (standing guillotine choke)	2	3:20
Bantamweight	Miriam Nakamoto	vs.	Jessamyn Duke	No contest (illegal knee)	1	2:20	(Note: Originally a knockout victory for Nakamoto, but was later overturned by the Missouri Office of Athletics due to an illegal knee.)
Strawweight	Katja Kankaanpää	def.	Juliana Carneiro Lima	Decision (unanimous) (30–27, 30–27, 29–28)	3	5:00
Strawweight	Rose Namajunas	def.	Kathina Catron	Submission (flying armbar)	1	0:12
Atomweight	Alex Chambers	def.	Jodie Esquibel	Submission (rear-naked choke)	1	1:35

=== Bonus awards ===
The following fighters were awarded monetary bonuses:

- Fight of the Night: Sarah Kaufman vs. Leslie Smith ($1,500 each)
- Submission of the Night: Rose Namajunas
- Knockout of the Night: Miriam Nakamoto (revoked after the Missouri Office of Athletics ruled Nakamoto had won due to an illegal knee)

== Invicta FC 4: Esparza vs. Hyatt ==
Invicta FC 4: Esparza vs. Hyatt
- Date: January 5, 2013
- Venue: Memorial Hall
- City: Kansas City, Kansas, United States

Event chronology
Invicta FC 3: Penne vs. Sugiyama	Invicta FC 4: Esparza vs. Hyatt	Invicta FC 5: Penne vs. Waterson

Invicta FC 4: Esparza vs. Hyatt was a mixed martial arts event held on January 5, 2013 at the Memorial Hall in Kansas City, Kansas. The event was headlined by a strawweight championship bout between Carla Esparza and Bec Hyatt. Esparza was originally scheduled to fight Ayaka Hamasaki for the title but Hamasaki pulled out of the fight due to commitments to defending her JEWELS lightweight title in December and was replaced by undefeated Brazilian fighter Cláudia Gadelha. On December 28, Gadelha was forced to withdraw from the main event title fight after suffering a broken nose in training. Gadelha was replaced by Bec Hyatt, who was originally set to face Joanne Calderwood. As a result, Calderwood's opponent was changed to Livia von Plettenberg. On December 19, Shannon Knapp announced Invicta FC 4 would air as an online pay-per-view however due to purchasing issues on the night of the event, the idea was thrown out and it was announced that all buyers would be refunded. The price for the Ustream run iPPV for IFC4 was $7.95.

After the event, fight of the night (US$1,500 bonus to each fighter) went to Alexis Davis and Shayna Baszler. The submission of the night bonus (US$1,000 bonus) went to Rose Namajunas while knockout of the night (US$1,000 bonus) went to Veronica Rothenhausler. Additionally, Bec Hyatt and Jodie Esquibel both received a social media bonus.

=== Results ===
Main Card (UFC Fight Pass)
Weight class				Method	Round	Time	Notes
Strawweight	Carla Esparza	def.	Bec Hyatt	Decision (unanimous) (50–45, 50–45, 50–45).	5	5:00	(Note: For the inaugural Invicta FC Strawweight Championship)
Bantamweight	Alexis Davis	def.	Shayna Baszler	Technical submission (rear-naked choke)	3	2:58
Bantamweight	Leslie Smith	def.	Raquel Pennington	Decision (unanimous) (29–28, 29–28, 29–28)	3	5:00
Bantamweight	Sarah D'Alelio	def.	Amanda Nunes	Decision (unanimous) (30–26, 30–26, 30–26)	3	5:00	(Note: Nunes was docked a point for an illegal upkick.)
Featherweight	Ediane Gomes	def.	Hiroko Yamanaka	Decision (unanimous) (29–28, 29–28, 30–27)	3	5:00
Strawweight	Joanne Calderwood	def.	Livia von Plettenberg	Decision (unanimous) (30–27, 30–27, 30–26)	3	5:00
Preliminary Card
Atomweight	Cassie Rodish	def.	Stephanie Frausto	TKO (strikes)	3	1:04
Featherweight	Tamikka Brents	def.	Amanda Bell	Decision (unanimous) (29–28, 29–28, 29–28)	3	5:00
Atomweight	Jodie Esquibel	def.	Liz McCarthy	Decision (split) (29–28, 28–29, 30–27)	3	5:00
Strawweight	Rose Namajunas	def.	Emily Kagan	Submission (rear-naked choke)	3	3:44
Strawweight	Tecia Torres	def.	Paige VanZant	Decision (unanimous) (30–27, 30–27, 30–27)	3	5:00
Featherweight	Veronica Rothenhausler	def.	Katalina Malungahu	KO (punch)	1	1:12
Atomweight	Laura Marcusse-Sanko	def.	Cassie Robb	Submission (rear-naked choke)	2	1:07

=== Bonus awards ===
The following fighters were awarded monetary bonuses:

- Fight of the Night: Alexis Davis vs. Shayna Baszler ($1,500 each)
- Knockout of the Night: Veronica Rothenhausler ($1,000)
- Submission of the Night: Rose Namajunas ($1,000)

== Invicta FC 3: Penne vs. Sugiyama ==
Invicta FC 3: Penne vs. Sugiyama
- Date: October 6, 2012
- Venue: Memorial Hall
- City: Kansas City, Kansas, United States

Event chronology
Invicta FC 2: Baszler vs. McMann	Invicta FC 3: Penne vs. Sugiyama	Invicta FC 4: Esparza vs. Hyatt

Invicta FC 3: Penne vs Sugiyama was a mixed martial arts event to be held on October 6, 2012 at the Memorial Hall in Kansas City, Kansas. Invicta President Shannon Knapp has announced that the event will feature the first championship bout for Invicta Fighting Championships. Invicta will continue their partnership with JEWELS as Jessica Penne will face unbeaten JEWELS Featherweight Queen (105 lb.) Naho Sugiyama for the Invicta FC Atomweight Championship. Sara McMann was originally scheduled to fight for Invicta FC Bantamweight Championship but will be recovering from injury. Knapp has since announced that a fight will be held to determine who eventually faces McMann for the championship. On August 27, Invicta added former Strikeforce women's champion Sarah Kaufman to the card in a fight against Kaitlin Young. However, on September 17, Kaufman was forced to withdraw due to injury.

Leslie Smith was originally scheduled to fight Cat Zingano, but the promotion allowed Zingano to withdraw from the fight so that she could accept a fight for Strikeforce. Zingano was replaced by pro boxer and undefeated MMA fighter, Kim Connor-Hamby. Katalina Malungahu was scheduled to fight Taylor Stratford, however Stratford was forced to withdraw due to a knee injury. Stratford was replaced by Ediane Gomes. Sarah Kaufman was set to fight Kaitlin Young, however an injury forced Kaufman to withdraw from the fight on September 17. As a result, Leslie Smith was moved from her fight with Connor-Hamby to fight Young in what was to be a rematch from Invicta FC 1 where they fought to a draw. Raquel Pennington was added as the new opponent for Kim Connor-Hamby. On September 26, Connor-Hamby withdrew from the fight due to injury. After Strikeforce canceled their previously scheduled event, Cat Zingano was added back to the Invicta 3 card as the replacement opponent against Pennington. Julia Budd was set to fight Elaina Maxwell but Maxwell withdrew after suffering a concussion in training and was replaced by Danielle West.

Tara LaRosa (127.6 lbs) and Lacey Schuckman (106.2 lbs) failed to make weight at the weigh in. Schuckman was able to get within 1 pound of her 105 weight class limit within the next two hours and was fined 10% of her purse. LaRosa was not able to get within one pound of 125 pounds within two hours and was fined 25% of her purse. After the event, fight of the night (US$1,500 bonus to each fighter) went to Michelle Waterson and Lacey Schuckman. The submission of the night bonus (US$1,000 bonus) was split between Jessamyn Duke and Stephanie Frausto while knockout of the night (US$1,000 bonus) went to Joanne Calderwood.

=== Results ===
Main Card (UFC Fight Pass)
Weight class				Method	Round	Time	Notes
Atomweight	Jessica Penne	def.	Naho Sugiyama	Submission (triangle choke)	2	2:20	(Note: For the inaugural Invicta FC Atomweight Championship)
Bantamweight	Shayna Baszler	def.	Sarah D'Alelio	Submission (rear-naked choke)	2	0:37
Bantamweight	Leslie Smith	def.	Kaitlin Young	TKO (strikes)	2	2:19
Flyweight	Barb Honchak	def.	Aisling Daly	Decision (unanimous) (30–27, 30–27, 30–27)	3	5:00
Catchweight (128 lbs.)	Vanessa Porto	def.	Tara LaRosa	Decision (unanimous) (30–27, 30–27, 30–27)	3	5:00
Bantamweight	Cat Zingano	def.	Raquel Pennington	Submission (rear-naked choke)	2	3:32
Atomweight	Michelle Waterson	def.	Lacey Schuckman	Decision (split) (29–28, 28–29, 29–28)	3	5:00
Featherweight	Julia Budd	def.	Danielle West	TKO (strikes)	1	2:32
Preliminary Card
Strawweight	Carla Esparza	def.	Lynn Alvarez	TKO (strikes)	1	2:53
Strawweight	Joanne Calderwood	def.	Ashley Cummins	KO (knee)	1	3:13
Atomweight	Stephanie Frausto	def.	Amy Davis	Submission (guillotine choke)	1	0:48
Bantamweight	Jessamyn Duke	def.	Marciea Allen	Submission (armbar)	1	4:42
Strawweight	Tecia Torres	def.	Kaiyana Rain	Decision (unanimous) (30–27, 30–27, 30–27)	3	5:00
Featherweight	Ediane Gomes	def.	Katalina Malungahu	Submission (rear-naked choke)	1	4:19

=== Bonus awards ===
The following fighters were awarded monetary bonuses:

- Fight of the Night: Michelle Waterson vs. Lacey Schuckman ($1,500 each)
- Knockout of the Night: Joanne Calderwood ($1,000)
- Submission of the Night: Stephanie Frausto and Jessamyn Duke ($500 each)

== Invicta FC 2: Baszler vs. McMann ==
Invicta FC 2: Baszler vs. McMann
- Date: July 28, 2012
- Venue: Memorial Hall
- City: Kansas City, Kansas, United States

Event chronology
Invicta FC 1: Coenen vs. Ruyssen	Invicta FC 2: Baszler vs. McMann	Invicta FC 3: Penne vs. Sugiyama

Invicta FC 2: Baszler vs. McMann was a mixed martial arts event held on July 28, 2012 at the Memorial Hall in Kansas City, Kansas. Like the first event, it was made available as a free stream on the promotion's official website. The event was headlined by 2004 Summer Olympics women's freestyle wrestling silver medalist Sara McMann and Shayna Baszler. It will be the second event of the promotion.

As part of the alliance with Japanese promotion JEWELS, JEWELS Lightweight Queen (115 lbs.) Ayaka Hamasaki was set to face undefeated Austrian fighter Jasminka Cive as part of the main event but Cive was unable to secure her visa in time and has been replaced by Lacey Shuckman. Angelica Chaves was scheduled to fight Kikuyo Ishikawa on the card, but Ishikawa withdrew from the fight on June 7. Ishikawa was replaced by Nicdali Rivera-Calanoc.

Vanessa Porto was scheduled to fight Kelly Kobold but on June 25, Kobold withdrew from the fight due to a shoulder injury suffered while training. Kobold was replaced by Sarah D'Alelio.

Amanda Nunes was scheduled to fight Milana Dudieva but Dudieva withdrew from the fight on July 9 due to a medical illness and was replaced by Leslie Smith. However, on July 20, Smith suffered a hand injury that forced her to also withdraw from the fight and she was then replaced by Raquel Pa'aluhi in the fight with Nunes.

Jessica Phillipus missed weight for her bout and forfeited 25% of her fight purse.

=== Results ===
Main Card
Weight class				Method	Round	Time	Notes
Bantamweight	Sara McMann	def.	Shayna Baszler	Decision (unanimous) (29–28, 30–27, 29–28)	3	5:00
Bantamweight	Alexis Davis	def.	Hitomi Akano	Submission (rear-naked choke)	2	3:41
Bantamweight	Liz Carmouche	def.	Kaitlin Young	Submission (rear-naked choke)	2	3:34
Strawweight	Ayaka Hamasaki	def.	Lacey Schuckman	Submission (armbar)	3	4:45
Bantamweight	Amanda Nunes	def.	Raquel Pa'aluhi	Technical Submission (rear-naked choke)	1	2:24
Bantamweight	Sarah D'Alelio	def.	Vanessa Porto	Submission (armbar)	1	3:16
Flyweight	Barb Honchak	def.	Bethany Marshall	TKO (strikes)	2	1:22
Featherweight	Julia Budd	def.	Elina Nilsson	TKO (strikes)	1	3:49
Strawweight	Carla Esparza	def.	Sarah Schneider	TKO (strikes)	2	4:28
Preliminary Card
Atomweight	Nicdali Rivera-Calanoc	def.	Angelica Chavez	Decision (unanimous) (30–27, 29–28, 29–28)	3	5:00
Bantamweight	Raquel Pennington	def.	Sarah Moras	Decision (unanimous) (30–27, 29–28, 29–28)	3	5:00
Bantamweight	Jessamyn Duke	def.	Suzie Montero	TKO (strikes)	3	2:32
Flyweight	Jocelyn Jones-Lybarger	def.	Cheryl Chan	Decision (unanimous) (29–28, 29–28, 29–28)	3	5:00
Catchweight (107 lbs.)	Liz McCarthy	def.	Jessica Philippus	TKO (doctor stoppage)	1	5:00	(Note: Phillipus was docked a point for illegal knees.)

=== Bonus awards ===
The following fighters were awarded monetary bonuses:

- Fight of the Night: Sara McMann vs. Shayna Baszler ($1,500 each)
- Submission of the Night: Sarah D'Alelio and Alexis Davis ($1,000 each)
- Knockout of the Night: none awarded

== Invicta FC 1: Coenen vs. Ruyssen ==
Invicta FC 1: Coenen vs. Ruyssen
- Date: April 28, 2012
- Venue: Memorial Hall
- City: Kansas City, Kansas, United States

Event chronology
Invicta FC 1: Coenen vs. Ruyssen	Invicta FC 2: Baszler vs. McMann

Invicta FC 1: Coenen vs. Ruyssen was the inaugural event of the promotion held on April 28, 2012 at the Memorial Hall in Kansas City, Kansas, United States. It was headlined by former Strikeforce women's bantamweight champion Marloes Coenen and French fighter Romy Ruyssen, who had lost to Coenen by 2nd round submission in her second professional fight in 2008. The event also marked the MMA debut of 2008 Summer Olympics women's freestyle wrestling medalist Randi Miller.

The event was not televised, but was available as a free video stream at the Invicta Fighting Championships webpage. Fighters Sofia Bagherdai, Randi Miller, Ashleigh Curry, and Romy Ruyssen missed weight for their bouts. Bagherdai and Curry forfeited 10% of their purse to their opponent, while Miller and Ruyssen forfeited 25% of their purse to their opponent.

=== Results ===
Main Card
Weight class				Method	Round	Time	Notes
Catchweight (149 lbs)	Marloes Coenen	def.	Romy Ruyssen	Decision (unanimous) (30–26, 30–26, 30–26)	3	5:00	(Note: Ruyssen was docked a point for grabbing the fence.)
Atomweight	Jessica Penne	def.	Lisa Ellis	TKO (strikes)	3	2:48
Bantamweight	Liz Carmouche	def.	Ashleigh Curry	TKO (strikes)	1	1:58
Bantamweight	Leslie Smith	draws	Kaitlin Young	Draw (split) (29–28, 28–29, 29–29)	3	5:00
Bantamweight	Sarah D'Alelio	def.	Vanessa Mariscal	Submission (strikes)	2	3:20
Strawweight	Sarah Schneider	def.	Sally Krumdiack	Submission (armbar)	1	3:01
Preliminary Card
Atomweight	Amy Davis	def.	Nicdali Rivera-Calanoc	Submission (kimura)	2	3:47
Flyweight	Sarah Maloy	def.	Michele Gutierrez	Decision (unanimous) (30–27, 29–28, 29–28)	3	5:00
Catchweight (149 lbs)	Randi Miller	def.	Mollie Estes	TKO (strikes)	3	3:27
Catchweight (120 lbs)	Ashley Cummins	def.	Sofia Bagherdai	Decision (unanimous) (30–27, 30–27, 29–28)	3	5:00
Atomweight	Cassie Rodish	def.	Meghan Wright	Submission (guillotine choke)	1	0:36

=== Bonus awards ===
The following fighters were awarded monetary bonuses:

- Fight of the Night: Kaitlin Young vs. Leslie Smith ($1,500 each)
- Submission of the Night: Sarah Schneider ($1,000)
- Knockout of the Night: none awarded
- Social Media bonuses: Liz Carmouche and Jessica Penne ($1,000 each)
  Source(s)

== See also ==
- List of current Invicta FC fighters
