= Karina Rodríguez =

Karina Rodríguez may refer to:

- Karina Rodríguez (footballer) (born 1999), American-born Mexican footballer
- Karina Rodríguez (fighter) (born 1985), Mexican mixed martial artist
- Karina Rodríguez (sport shooter) (born 1979), Peruvian sport shooter
