= Dudiyev =

Dudiyev (masculine, Russian: Дудиев) or Dudiyeva (feminine, Russian: Дудиева) is a Russian surname. Notable people with the surname include:

- Aslan Dudiyev (born 1990), Russian football player
- Milana Dudieva (born 1989), Russian mixed martial artist
