= Jason Saggo =

Canadian mixed martial arts fighter

- Born: November 23, 1985 (age 40); Toronto, Ontario, Canada
- Height: 5 ft 11 in (1.80 m)
- Weight: 155 lb (70 kg; 11.1 st)
- Division: Lightweight
- Reach: 70 in (180 cm)
- Style: Submission grappling
- Fighting out of: Charlottetown, Prince Edward Island, Canada
- Team: Wulfrun MMA, PEI Mixed Martial Arts
- Rank: Black belt in Brazilian Jiu-Jitsu under Royler Gracie
- Years active: 2009–present

Mixed martial arts record
- Total: 17
- Wins: 13
- By knockout: 3
- By submission: 9
- By decision: 1
- Losses: 4
- By knockout: 1
- By decision: 3

Other information
- Mixed martial arts record from Sherdog

Jason Saggo (born November 23, 1985) is a Canadian mixed martial artist who previously fought in the lightweight division of the Ultimate Fighting Championship (UFC).

== Background ==
Saggo graduated from University of Guelph.

He currently resides in Prince Edward Island, where he owns and operates the P.E.I. Martial Arts Academy gym; which has locations in Summerside, Stratford, and O'Leary.

== Mixed martial arts career ==
Saggo made his professional debut in August 2009, winning a fight in Northern Ireland. He amassed a record of 9–1, competing primarily for various regional promotions in Canada before signing with the Ultimate Fighting Championship in the spring of 2014.

=== Ultimate Fighting Championship ===
Saggo made his promotional debut against Josh Shockley on June 14, 2014, at UFC 174. Saggo defeated Shockley via first round TKO.

Saggo faced promotional newcomer Paul Felder on October 4, 2014, at UFC Fight Night 54. Saggo lost the fight by split decision.

Saggo was expected to face Marcin Bandel on April 11, 2015, at UFC Fight Night 64. However, Saggo pulled out of the bout due to an injury to his achilles tendon and was replaced by promotional newcomer Stevie Ray.

Saggo faced Justin Salas on March 5, 2016, at UFC 196. He won the fight via TKO in the first round.

Saggo next faced Leandro Silva on June 18, 2016, at UFC Fight Night 89. He won the fight via split decision.

Saggo faced Rustam Khabilov on December 10, 2016, at UFC 206. He lost the one-sided fight via unanimous decision.

Saggo faced Gilbert Burns on September 16, 2017, at UFC Fight Night 116. He lost the fight via knockout in the second round. He was subsequently released from the UFC.

=== BTC Fight Promotions ===
Following his release from the UFC, Saggo signed a multi-fight deal with BTC Fight Promotions out of Burlington, Ontario. He had his first fight on November 24, 2018, against Adam Assenza at BTC 4 for the BTC Lightweight Championship and won via first round rear-naked choke.

On May 9, Saggo vacated the lightweight title in preparation for a catchweight bout against Deivison Ribeiro on June 1, 2019, at BTC 6.

== Mixed martial arts record ==
Professional record breakdown
17 matches	13 wins	4 losses
By knockout	3	1
By submission	9	0
By decision	1	3

Res.	Record	Opponent	Method	Event	Date	Round	Time	Location	Notes
Win	13–4	Adam Assenza	Submission (rear-naked choke)	BTC 4: Vendetta	November 24, 2018	1	4:53	Peterborough, Ontario, Canada	For the BTC Lightweight Championship.
Loss	12–4	Gilbert Burns	KO (punch)	UFC Fight Night: Rockhold vs. Branch	September 16, 2017	2	4:55	Pittsburgh, Pennsylvania, United States	
Loss	12–3	Rustam Khabilov	Decision (unanimous)	UFC 206	December 10, 2016	3	5:00	Toronto, Ontario, Canada	Catchweight (158 lbs) bout; Khabilov missed weight.
Win	12–2	Leandro Silva	Decision (split)	UFC Fight Night: MacDonald vs. Thompson	June 18, 2016	3	5:00	Ottawa, Ontario, Canada	
Win	11–2	Justin Salas	TKO (punches)	UFC 196	March 5, 2016	1	4:31	Las Vegas, Nevada, United States	
Loss	10–2	Paul Felder	Decision (split)	UFC Fight Night: MacDonald vs. Saffiedine	October 4, 2014	3	5:00	Halifax, Nova Scotia, Canada	
Win	10–1	Josh Shockley	TKO (punches)	UFC 174	June 14, 2014	1	4:57	Vancouver, British Columbia, Canada	
Win	9–1	Stephen Beaumont	Submission (rear-naked choke)	AFC 19	July 5, 2013	1	3:46	Edmonton, Alberta, Canada	
Win	8–1	Iraj Hadin	Submission (rear-naked choke)	SFS 7	November 23, 2012	2	3:41	Hamilton, Ontario, Canada	
Win	7–1	Eric Attard	Submission (rear-naked choke)	SFS 5	August 25, 2012	1	3:24	Hamilton, Ontario, Canada	
Win	6–1	Keven Morin	TKO (punches)	Ringside MMA 12	October 21, 2011	3	3:49	Montreal, Quebec, Canada	
Loss	5–1	Jesse Ronson	Decision (split)	Global Warriors FC 1	August 13, 2011	3	5:00	Hamilton, Ontario, Canada	
Win	5–0	Derek Boyle	Submission (rear-naked choke)	JEG - MMA Live 1	May 19, 2011	3	2:18	London, Ontario, Canada	
Win	4–0	Taylor Soloman	Submission (armbar)	Knockout Entertainment MMA: The Reckoning	April 2, 2011	2	3:25	Orillia, Ontario, Canada	
Win	3–0	Kyle Vivian	Submission (triangle choke)	Ringside MMA 9	November 13, 2010	1	2:03	Montreal, Quebec, Canada	
Win	2–0	David Lafond	Submission (triangle choke)	Ringside MMA 8	August 7, 2010	2	2:38	Beauport, Quebec, Canada	
Win	1–0	Dominic McConnell	Submission (rear-naked choke)	UC 4	August 28, 2009	1	0:00	Newry, Northern Ireland	
