= Elizabeth Phillips (martial artist) =

American mixed martial arts fighter

- Born: 20 August 1986 (age 40); Spokane, Washington, U.S.
- Height: 5 ft 6 in (1.68 m)
- Weight: 135 lb (61 kg; 9.6 st)
- Division: Bantamweight; Featherweight
- Reach: 65 in (165 cm)

Mixed martial arts record
- Total: 17
- Wins: 7
- By knockout: 2
- By submission: 1
- By decision: 4
- Losses: 10
- By knockout: 2
- By decision: 8

Amateur record
- Total: 5
- Wins: 3
- Losses: 1
- By submission: 1
- Draws: 1

Other information
- Mixed martial arts record from Sherdog

Elizabeth Phillips is an American mixed martial artist who competes in the Bantamweight division. She was previously signed with the Ultimate Fighting Championship.

== Mixed martial arts career ==
=== Early career ===
Phillips made her amateur MMA debut in June 2011. She amassed a record of 3–1–1 over the next year.

Phillips made her professional MMA debut in September 2012. Before signing with the UFC she built a record of 4–1.

=== Ultimate Fighting Championship ===
Phillips made her UFC debut against Valérie Létourneau at UFC 174 on June 14, 2014. She lost the fight via split decision.

Phillips next faced Milana Dudieva at UFC Fight Night: Bisping vs. Le on August 23, 2014. She lost the fight via controversial split decision.

In her third fight with the promotion, Phillips faced Jessamyn Duke at UFC on Fox: Dillashaw vs. Barão 2 on July 25, 2015. She won the bout by unanimous decision.

During her fight with Duke, Phillips suffered two wardrobe malfunctions. Her left nipple was accidentally exposed in the first round, and her right nipple in the third round. Both incidents occurred while she was on her back. The footage of her bare nipples was later edited from the recordings, but many screenshots and videos were recorded by fans.

Phillips faced Raquel Pennington at UFC 202 on August 20, 2016. She lost the fight by unanimous decision and was subsequently released from the promotion.

=== Post UFC ===
In her first appearance after her UFC release, Philips faced Leah Letson on January 14, 2017, at Invicta FC 21, losing the bout after getting knocked out with a head kick in the first round.

After picking up a unanimous decision victory on the regional scene, Philips fought fellow UFC vet Kelly Faszholz at Invicta FC 23: Porto vs. Niedźwiedź on May 20, 2017. Phillips missed weight by 5 pounds and the fight was held at 140 lbs, with 20% of Phillips' purse going to Kelly. She won the fight via unanimous decision.

Philips faced Jessy Miele at CES 56 on May 31, 2019. She lost the bout via split decision.

Philips returned two years later on June 12, 2021, losing to Serena DeJesus via unanimous decision at Fusion Fight League.

The next year, Philips lost via unanimous decision to Claudia Zamora on September 16, 2022, at Combate Global: Gonzalez vs. Terry.

== Mixed martial arts record ==
Professional record breakdown
| 17 matches | 7 wins | 10 losses |
| By knockout | 2 | 2 |
| By submission | 1 | 0 |
| By decision | 4 | 8 |

| Res. | Record | Opponent | Method | Event | Date | Round | Time | Location | Notes |
|---|---|---|---|---|---|---|---|---|---|
| Loss | 7–10 | Alexa Conners | Decision (split) | Conflict MMA 57 | May 27, 2023 | 3 | 5:00 | Columbia, South Carolina, United States | Catchweight (140 lb) bout. |
| Loss | 7–9 | Claudia Zamora | Decision (unanimous) | Combate Global: Gonzalez vs. Terry | September 16, 2022 | 3 | 5:00 | Miami, Florida, United States | |
| Loss | 7–8 | Serena DeJesus | Decision (unanimous) | Fusion Fight League: De Jesus vs. Phillips | June 12, 2021 | 3 | 5:00 | Helena, Montana, United States | |
| Loss | 7–7 | Jessy Miele | Decision (split) | CES 56 | May 31, 2019 | 3 | 5:00 | Hartford, Connecticut, United States | Featherweight bout. |
| Win | 7–6 | Nikohl Johnson | Decision (unanimous) | KOTC - New Beginning | November 16, 2017 | 3 | 5:00 | Worley, Idaho, United States | |
| Loss | 6–6 | Kelly Faszholz | Decision (unanimous) | Invicta FC 23: Porto vs. Niedźwiedź | May 20, 2017 | 3 | 5:00 | Kansas City, Missouri, United States | Catchweight (140 lb) bout; Phillips missed weight. |
| Win | 6–5 | Sarah Howell | Decision (unanimous) | ExciteFight - Conquest of the Cage | February 3, 2017 | 3 | 5:00 | Airway Heights, Washington, United States | |
| Loss | 5–5 | Leah Letson | KO (head kick and punches) | Invicta FC 21: Anderson vs. Tweet | January 14, 2017 | 1 | 1:18 | Kansas City, Missouri, United States | Featherweight bout. |
| Loss | 5–4 | Raquel Pennington | Decision (unanimous) | UFC 202 | August 20, 2016 | 3 | 5:00 | Las Vegas, Nevada, United States | |
| Win | 5–3 | Jessamyn Duke | Decision (unanimous) | UFC on Fox: Dillashaw vs. Barão 2 | July 25, 2015 | 3 | 5:00 | Chicago, Illinois, United States | |
| Loss | 4–3 | Milana Dudieva | Decision (split) | UFC Fight Night: Bisping vs. Le | August 23, 2014 | 3 | 5:00 | Macau, SAR, China | |
| Loss | 4–2 | Valérie Létourneau | Decision (split) | UFC 174 | June 14, 2014 | 3 | 5:00 | Vancouver, British Columbia, Canada | |
| Win | 4–1 | Katie Howard | Decision (unanimous) | Conquest of the Cage 16 | May 30, 2014 | 3 | 5:00 | Airway Heights, Washington, United States | |
| Win | 3–1 | Rachael Swatez | TKO (punches) | Conquest of the Cage 15 | February 28, 2014 | 3 | 1:19 | Airway Heights, Washington, United States | |
| Win | 2–1 | Kristen Stenzel | Submission (rear-naked choke) | Conquest of the Cage 14 | November 20, 2013 | 1 | 0:49 | Airway Heights, Washington, United States | |
| Win | 1–1 | Stevie VanAssche | TKO (punches) | Conquest of the Cage 13 | July 20, 2013 | 3 | N/A | Airway Heights, Washington, United States | |
| Loss | 0–1 | Miriam Nakamoto | TKO (knees) | Red Canvas - Art of Submission 2 | September 15, 2012 | 2 | 3:39 | San Jose, California, United States | Bantamweight debut. |

=== Amateur mixed martial arts record ===
Professional record breakdown
| 5 matches | 3 wins | 1 loss |
| By submission | 0 | 1 |
| By decision | 3 | 0 |
| Draws | 1 | |

| Res. | Record | Opponent | Method | Event | Date | Round | Time | Location | Notes |
|---|---|---|---|---|---|---|---|---|---|
| Win | 3–1–1 | Priscilla White | Decision (split) | NOC - Night of Champions 7 | June 16, 2012 | 3 | 3:00 | Pasco, Washington, United States | |
| Loss | 2–1–1 | Jessamyn Duke | Submission (guillotine Choke) | RFA 2 - Yvel vs. Alexander | March 30, 2012 | 2 | 0:58 | Kearney, Nebraska, United States | |
| Win | 2–0–1 | Melissa Deer | Decision (unanimous) | ROTR - Rumble on the Ridge 22 | February 18, 2012 | 3 | 3:00 | Snoqualmie, Washington, United States | |
| Win | 1–0–1 | Taylor Hughes | Decision (unanimous) | LOTC - Battle at the Bay | July 16, 2011 | 3 | 3:00 | Manson, Washington, United States | |
| Draw | 0–0–1 | Priscilla White | Draw | LOTC - Lords of the Cage | June 10, 2011 | 3 | 3:00 | Yakima, Washington, United States | |

== See also ==
- List of current UFC fighters
- List of female mixed martial artists
