= Valérie Létourneau =

Canadian mixed martial arts (MMA) fighter (born 1983)

- Born: April 29, 1983 (age 43); Montreal, Quebec, Canada
- Other names: Trouble
- Height: 5 ft 7 in (1.70 m)
- Weight: 125.5 lb (57 kg; 9 st 0 lb)
- Division: Strawweight; Flyweight; Bantamweight
- Reach: 68 1/2 in (174 cm)
- Style: Boxing, Kickboxing
- Stance: Orthodox
- Fighting out of: Coconut Creek, Florida, United States
- Team: American Top Team
- Rank: Purple belt in Brazilian Jiu-Jitsu under Bruno Fernandes
- Years active: 2007–2019

Mixed martial arts record
- Total: 17
- Wins: 10
- By knockout: 4
- By submission: 1
- By decision: 5
- Losses: 7
- By knockout: 2
- By submission: 1
- By decision: 4

Other information
- Mixed martial arts record from Sherdog

Valérie Létourneau (born April 29, 1983) is a retired Canadian mixed martial artist who competed in the Women's Flyweight and Strawweight divisions for Bellator MMA and Ultimate Fighting Championship (UFC) .

== Mixed martial arts career ==
Létourneau made her MMA debut March 31, 2007 with TKO win over Tannaya Hantelman. Létourneau then lost her next two fights to future UFC Women's Bantamweights Sarah Kaufman & Alexis Davis. Létourneau broke her hand in the first round of her fight with Davis. After Létourneau rebounded by winning her next three fights she then set to face future UFC Women's Strawweight Cláudia Gadelha at Wreck MMA: Road to Glory. She lost via split decision.

Létourneau returned at AFC 21 finishing off Jordan Moore in 34 seconds via TKO.

=== The Ultimate Fighter ===
Létourneau was one of the female contestants competing to get into the TUF house for the TUF 18 season. She lost via rear-naked choke to Roxanne Modafferi.

=== Ultimate Fighting Championship ===
Létourneau made her UFC debut at UFC 174 taking on Elizabeth Phillips, who was filling in for the injured Milana Dudieva. Létourneau won the fight via split decision.

Létourneau returned to the octagon to face fellow Canadian Jessica Rakoczy at UFC 186. Létourneau won the bout via unanimous decision.

Létourneau next faced undefeated Maryna Moroz at UFC Fight Night 74. She won via unanimous decision.

Létourneau faced Strawweight champion Joanna Jędrzejczyk on November 15, 2015 in the co-main event at UFC 193. She lost the fight by unanimous decision (49-46, 49-46, 50-45).

Létourneau faced Joanne Calderwood at UFC Fight Night: MacDonald vs. Thompson in the first ever women's flyweight bout in UFC history. She lost the fight via TKO in the third round.

Létourneau faced Viviane Pereira at UFC 206. She lost the fight by a very controversial split decision and was subsequently released from the promotion.

=== Bellator MMA ===
On April 24, 2017, Létourneau signed a new contract with Bellator MMA. The deal enabled her to fight at a weight of 125 pounds, an easier weight cut than the 115 pound weight limit required for the UFC's strawweight division.

Létourneau was expected to debut against Emily Ducote at Bellator 181 on July 14, 2017. However, on July 10, she pulled out of the bout due to injury.

Létourneau eventually made her debut against Kate Jackson at Bellator 191 on December 15, 2017. She won the fight by unanimous decision.

Letourneau then faced Kristina Williams at Bellator 201, earning the a unanimous decision victory.

Letourneau faced Ilima-Lei Macfarlane at Bellator 213 for the Bellator Women's Flyweight World Championship. She was defeated by third round submission.

== Mixed martial arts record ==
Professional record breakdown
17 matches	10 wins	7 losses
By knockout	4	2
By submission	1	1
By decision	5	4

Res.	Record	Opponent	Method	Event	Date	Round	Time	Location	Notes
Loss	10–7	Ilima-Lei Macfarlane	Submission (triangle choke)	Bellator 213	December 15, 2018	3	3:19	Honolulu, Hawaii, United States	For the Bellator Women's Flyweight World Championship.
Win	10–6	Kristina Williams	Decision (unanimous)	Bellator 201	June 29, 2018	3	5:00	Temecula, California, United States	
Win	9–6	Kate Jackson	Decision (unanimous)	Bellator 191	December 15, 2017	3	5:00	Newcastle, England	
Loss	8–6	Viviane Pereira	Decision (split)	UFC 206	December 10, 2016	3	5:00	Toronto, Ontario, Canada	Strawweight bout; Létourneau missed weight (117.5 lb).
Loss	8–5	Joanne Calderwood	TKO (body kick and punches)	UFC Fight Night: MacDonald vs. Thompson	June 18, 2016	3	2:51	Ottawa, Ontario, Canada	Return to Flyweight.
Loss	8–4	Joanna Jędrzejczyk	Decision (unanimous)	UFC 193	November 15, 2015	5	5:00	Melbourne, Australia	For the UFC Women's Strawweight Championship.
Win	8–3	Maryna Moroz	Decision (unanimous)	UFC Fight Night: Holloway vs. Oliveira	August 23, 2015	3	5:00	Saskatoon, Saskatchewan, Canada	
Win	7–3	Jessica Rakoczy	Decision (unanimous)	UFC 186	April 25, 2015	3	5:00	Montreal, Quebec, Canada	Strawweight debut.
Win	6–3	Elizabeth Phillips	Decision (split)	UFC 174	June 14, 2014	3	5:00	Vancouver, British Columbia, Canada	Bantamweight bout.
Win	5–3	Jordan Moore	TKO (punches)	Absolute FC 21	May 16, 2014	1	0:34	Hollywood, Florida, United States	Flyweight debut.
Loss	4–3	Cláudia Gadelha	Decision (split)	Wreck MMA: Road to Glory	April 20, 2012	3	5:00	Gatineau, Quebec, Canada	Catchweight (130 lb) bout.
Win	4–2	Tannaya Hantelman	TKO (punches)	Freedom Fight: For Honor and Pride	September 10, 2011	1	2:07	Sudbury, Ontario, Canada	
Win	3–2	Julie Malenfant	TKO (body kick and punches)	Ringside MMA 10	April 9, 2011	2	2:15	Montreal, Quebec, Canada	
Win	2–2	Kate Roy	Submission (armbar)	Xtreme MMA 7	February 27, 2009	1	3:23	Montreal, Quebec, Canada	
Loss	1–2	Alexis Davis	Decision (split)	TKO 31	December 14, 2007	3	5:00	Montreal, Quebec, Canada	
Loss	1–1	Sarah Kaufman	TKO (punches)	TKO 29	June 1, 2007	2	1:36	Montreal, Quebec, Canada	
Win	1–0	Tannaya Hantelman	TKO (punches)	Extreme Cage Combat 5	March 31, 2007	2	4:02	Halifax, Nova Scotia, Canada	Bantamweight debut.

Exhibition record breakdown		
1 match	0 wins	1 loss
By submission	0	1

Res.	Record	Opponent	Method	Event	Date	Round	Time	Location	Notes
Loss	0–1	Roxanne Modafferi	Submission (rear-naked choke)	The Ultimate Fighter: Team Rousey vs. Team Tate	September 4, 2013 (air date)	1	3:36	Las Vegas, Nevada, United States	TUF 18 elimination round

== See also ==
- List of female mixed martial artists
- List of Canadian UFC fighters
