= Julia Budd =

Canadian kickboxer and mixed martial artist (born 1983)

- Born: July 4, 1983 (age 43); Roberts Creek, British Columbia, Canada
- Other names: The Jewel
- Height: 5 ft 8 in (1.73 m)
- Weight: 145 lb (66 kg)
- Division: Lightweight; Featherweight
- Reach: 70 in (178 cm)
- Fighting out of: Port Moody, British Columbia, Canada
- Team: Gibson Kickboxing & Pankration
- Trainer: Lance Gibson
- Years active: 2010–present (MMA)

Kickboxing record
- Total: 12
- Wins: 10
- By knockout: 4
- Losses: 2

Mixed martial arts record
- Total: 23
- Wins: 17
- By knockout: 6
- By submission: 1
- By decision: 10
- Losses: 6
- By knockout: 2
- By submission: 1
- By decision: 3

Other information
- Mixed martial arts record from Sherdog
- Last updated on: January 1, 2014

Julia Budd (born July 4, 1983) is a Canadian mixed martial artist and kickboxer competing in the featherweight division. She was the first Bellator Women's Featherweight World Champion and has also fought in Strikeforce, Invicta Fighting Championships, and Professional Fighters League (PFL).

== Martial arts training ==
Budd practiced Muay Thai for many years and later became the only woman to defeat American Gina Carano in Muay Thai competition. Her second and final loss in the ring came by Germaine de Randamie, after which Budd made the move to MMA. Her Muay Thai record is 10–2. She began training in MMA at the end of 2008 and avenged her loss to de Randamie when she defeated her via unanimous decision in a 2011 MMA bout. Budd trains at the Gibson Kickboxing & Pankration Academy.

== Mixed martial arts career ==
Budd made her MMA debut on October 22, 2010 at Strikeforce Challengers 11, defeating Shana Nelson via TKO in the second round.

In her second fight for the promotion, Budd was knocked out in 14 seconds by Amanda Nunes at Strikeforce Challengers 13 on January 7, 2011.

On June 24, 2011, Budd faced Germaine de Randamie in a rematch under MMA rules at Strikeforce Challengers 16. She defeated de Randamie via unanimous decision.

Budd's final fight for Strikeforce came on November 18, 2011 when she was submitted by Ronda Rousey at Strikeforce Challengers 20.

=== Invicta Fighting Championships ===
In 2012, Budd signed with Invicta Fighting Championships and faced Swedish fighter Elina Nilsson at Invicta FC 2: Baszler vs. McMann on July 28, 2012. She defeated Nilsson via TKO in the first round.

Budd returned to Invicta FC on October 6, 2012 at Invicta FC 3: Penne vs. Sugiyama. She was originally scheduled to face Elaina Maxwell, but Maxwell sustained a concussion in training and Budd instead faced Danielle West. She defeated West via TKO in the first round.

Budd was scheduled to face Ediane Gomes at Invicta FC 5: Penne vs. Waterson on April 5, 2013. However, on February 15, 2013, it was announced that Invicta FC had signed Cristiane Santos to face Gomes on the card and Budd was to face Australian Fiona Muxlow. On March 19, 2013, Invicta FC announced that Gomes was injured and that Muxlow would now face Santos. Budd remained on the card and instead faced Mollie Estes. She won the fight via submission in the third round.

Budd was again scheduled to face Ediane Gomes at Invicta FC 6: Coenen vs. Cyborg on July 13, 2013. However, she suffered a neck injury and withdrew from the fight on June 26, 2013.

On December 7, 2013, Budd faced Charmaine Tweet at Invicta FC 7. She won the fight via unanimous decision.

=== Bellator MMA ===
In August 2014, Budd signed with Bellator.

Budd was expected to make her promotional debut at Bellator 133 on February 13, 2015, versus Talita Nogueira. However, Nogueira pulled out of the fight due to a knee injury, so Budd instead faced Gabrielle Holloway. She won the fight via unanimous decision.

Budd was set to face former Strikeforce Women's Bantamweight Champion Marloes Coenen for the inaugural Bellator Woman's Featherweight Championship at Bellator 155, however Budd got injured and was replaced by Alexis Dufresne in a non-title fight bout.

Budd faced Arlene Blencowe at Bellator 162 on October 21, 2016. She won the fight by majority decision.

Budd faced Marloes Coenen for Bellator Inaugural Women's Featherweight World Championship at Bellator 174 on March 3, 2017. She stopped the veteran Coenen in the fourth round via strikes after securing the full mount position.

In her first title defense, Budd faced Arlene Blencowe in a rematch on December 1, 2017, at Bellator 189. She won the fight by split decision.

In her second title defense, Budd faced Talita Nogueira on July 13, 2018, at Bellator 202. She won the fight and successfully defended her title via TKO in the third round.

In April 2019, news surfaced that Budd had signed a new, four-fight contract with Bellator.

On the first bout of the new deal, Budd faced Olga Rubin on July 12, 2019, at Bellator 224. She won the bout in the first round, dropping Rubin with a body kick and then ground and pounding her to a TKO victory.

In her fourth title defense, Budd faced Cris Cyborg on January 25, 2020, at Bellator 238 in Inglewood, California. She lost the fight via technical knockout in round four.

Budd faced Jessy Miele on August 21, 2020, at Bellator 234. She won the bout via unanimous decision.

Budd was initially expected to face Shooto Brazil champion Dayana Silva at Bellator 256 on April 9, 2021. However, the fight was rescheduled and eventually took place on April 16, 2021, at Bellator 257. Budd won the bout via split decision and became a free agent after fighting out her contract.

=== Professional Fighters League ===
On September 29, 2021, news surfaced that Budd had signed with Professional Fighters League and made her debut against Kaitlin Young on October 27, 2021, at PFL 10. She won the bout in decisive fashion via unanimous decision.

==== 2022 season ====
Budd faced Genah Fabian on May 6, 2022, at PFL 3. At weigh-ins, Fabian missed weight for her bout, weighing in at 160.8 pounds, 4.8 pounds over the lightweight non-title fight limit. She was fined 20 percent of her purse, ineligible to win playoff points, given a walkover loss, and was penalized one point in the standings. Budd received a walkover win regardless of bout outcome but was eligible to gain stoppage points. She lost the bout via unanimous decision.

Budd was scheduled to face Kayla Harrison on July 1, 2022, at PFL 6. However, a week before the event, Budd pulled out due to injury.

Budd faced Aspen Ladd on November 25, 2022, at PFL 10. She lost the bout via split decision.

==== 2023 season ====
Budd started the 2023 season against Larissa Pacheco on April 7, 2023, at PFL 2. She lost the fight by unanimous decision.

Budd faced Martina Jindrová on June 16, 2023, at PFL 5. She won the fight via unanimous decision.

Budd was scheduled to face Kayla Harrison at PFL 10 on November 24, 2023. However, Budd was removed from the fight that she "refused to fulfill her contractual obligation" and was replaced by Aspen Ladd at a catchweight of 150 pounds. She was subsequently released from the promotion.

=== Global Fight League ===
Budd was scheduled to face former UFC Women's Bantamweight Champion Holly Holm in the inaugural Global Fight League event on May 24, 2025 at GFL 1. However, the first two GFL events were postponed indefinitely.

== Personal life ==
Budd is married to former MMA fighter Lance Gibson and step-mother of current UFC lightweight fighter Lance Gibson Jr.

== Championships and accomplishments ==
- Bellator MMA
  - Bellator Women's Featherweight World Championship (one time; first; former)
    - Three successful title defenses
  - Most victories in Bellator Women's Featherweight division history (9)

== Mixed martial arts record ==
Professional record breakdown
23 matches	17 wins	6 losses
By knockout	6	2
By submission	1	1
By decision	10	3

Res.	Record	Opponent	Method	Event	Date	Round	Time	Location	Notes
Win	17–6	Martina Jindrová	Decision (unanimous)	PFL 5 (2023)	June 16, 2023	3	5:00	Atlanta, Georgia, United States	
Loss	16–6	Larissa Pacheco	Decision (unanimous)	PFL 2 (2023)	April 7, 2023	3	5:00	Las Vegas, Nevada, United States	
Loss	16–5	Aspen Ladd	Decision (split)	PFL 10 (2022)	November 25, 2022	3	5:00	New York City, New York, United States	Return to Featherweight.
Loss	16–4	Genah Fabian	Decision (unanimous)	PFL 3 (2022)	May 6, 2022	3	5:00	Arlington, Texas, United States	Catchweight (160.8 lb) bout; Fabian missed weight.
Win	16–3	Kaitlin Young	Decision (unanimous)	PFL 10 (2021)	October 27, 2021	3	5:00	Hollywood, Florida, United States	Lightweight debut.
Win	15–3	Dayana Silva	Decision (split)	Bellator 257	April 16, 2021	3	5:00	Uncasville, Connecticut, United States	
Win	14–3	Jessy Miele	Decision (unanimous)	Bellator 244	August 21, 2020	3	5:00	Uncasville, Connecticut, United States	Catchweight (147 lbs) bout; Miele missed weight.
Loss	13–3	Cris Cyborg	TKO (punches)	Bellator 238	January 25, 2020	4	1:14	Inglewood, California, United States	Lost the Bellator Women's Featherweight World Championship.
Win	13–2	Olga Rubin	TKO (body kick and punches)	Bellator 224	July 12, 2019	1	2:14	Thackerville, Oklahoma, United States	Defended the Bellator Women's Featherweight World Championship.
Win	12–2	Talita Nogueira	TKO (punches)	Bellator 202	July 13, 2018	3	4:07	Thackerville, Oklahoma, United States	Defended the Bellator Women's Featherweight World Championship.
Win	11–2	Arlene Blencowe	Decision (split)	Bellator 189	December 1, 2017	5	5:00	Thackerville, Oklahoma, United States	Defended the Bellator Women's Featherweight World Championship.
Win	10–2	Marloes Coenen	TKO (punches)	Bellator 174	March 3, 2017	4	2:42	Thackerville, Oklahoma, United States	Won the inaugural Bellator Women's Featherweight World Championship.
Win	9–2	Arlene Blencowe	Decision (majority)	Bellator 162	October 21, 2016	3	5:00	Memphis, Tennessee, United States	
Win	8–2	Roberta Rovel	Decision (unanimous)	Bellator 146	November 20, 2015	3	5:00	Thackerville, Oklahoma, United States	
Win	7–2	Gabrielle Holloway	Decision (unanimous)	Bellator 133	February 13, 2015	3	5:00	Fresno, California, United States	
Win	6–2	Charmaine Tweet	Decision (unanimous)	Invicta FC: Honchak vs. Smith	December 7, 2013	3	5:00	Kansas City, Missouri, United States	
Win	5–2	Mollie Estes	Submission (rear-naked choke)	Invicta FC: Penne vs. Waterson	April 5, 2013	3	1:04	Kansas City, Missouri, United States	
Win	4–2	Danielle West	TKO (elbows and punches)	Invicta FC: Penne vs. Sugiyama	October 6, 2012	1	2:32	Kansas City, Kansas, United States	
Win	3–2	Elina Nilsson	TKO (punches and elbows)	Invicta FC: Baszler vs. McMann	July 28, 2012	1	3:49	Kansas City, Kansas, United States	
Loss	2–2	Ronda Rousey	Submission (armbar)	Strikeforce Challengers: Britt vs. Sayers	November 18, 2011	1	0:39	Las Vegas, Nevada, United States	
Win	2–1	Germaine de Randamie	Decision (unanimous)	Strikeforce Challengers: Fodor vs. Terry	June 24, 2011	3	5:00	Kent, Washington, United States	
Loss	1–1	Amanda Nunes	KO (punches)	Strikeforce Challengers: Woodley vs. Saffiedine	January 7, 2011	1	0:14	Nashville, Tennessee, United States	
Win	1–0	Shana Nelson	TKO (punches)	Strikeforce Challengers: Bowling vs. Voelker	October 22, 2010	2	2:51	Fresno, California, United States	

== Kickboxing record ==
Kickboxing record
10 wins (4 KOs), 2 losses, 0 draws
Date	Result	Opponent	Event	Location	Method	Round	Time	Record
2008-05-03	Loss	(Netherlands) Germaine de Randamie	Next Generation Warriors	Utrecht, Netherlands	TKO (punches)	1	1:57	10–2
2007-00-00	Win	(Thailand) Nop	Bangla Boxing Stadium	Phuket, Thailand	KO (knee)	1		10–1
2007-05-12	Win	(United States) Natalie Fuz	Shindo Kumate 12	Tampa, Florida, US	Decision (unanimous)	3	3:00	9–1
2006-12-08	Win	(United States) Chrisanne Roseliep	Shindo Kumate	Tampa, Florida, US	Decision (split)	3	3:00	8–1
0000-00-00	Win	(Canada) Kayla Drane			TKO	4		7–1
2006-04-00	Win	(Canada) Lindsay Ball		Vancouver, British Columbia, Canada	Decision (split)			6–1
2005-06-04	Win	(Canada) Keri Scarr	King of Gladiators	Calgary, Alberta, Canada	Decision			5–1
2005-03-00	Win	(United States) Gina Carano			Decision			4–1
0000-00-00	Win	(Canada) Jodi Hensel			Decision			3–1
0000-00-00	Win	(Canada) Vanessa Parente			TKO	4		2–1
0000-00-00	Win	(Canada) Brenna Shaw			KO	2		1–1
0000-00-00	Loss	(Canada) Danielle Quee						0–1
Legend: Win Loss Draw/No contest Notes

== See also ==
- List of female kickboxers
- List of female mixed martial artists
