= Josh Shockley =

American mixed martial arts fighter

- Born: November 15, 1989 (age 36); Valparaiso, Indiana
- Nationality: American
- Height: 6 ft 1 in (1.85 m)
- Weight: 155 lb (70 kg; 11.1 st)
- Division: Lightweight
- Reach: 74.5 in (189 cm)
- Fighting out of: Hobart, Indiana, United States
- Team: Duneland Vale Tudo
- Years active: 2007–present

Mixed martial arts record
- Total: 15
- Wins: 11
- By knockout: 3
- By submission: 5
- By decision: 3
- Losses: 4
- By knockout: 1
- By submission: 2
- By decision: 1

Other information
- Mixed martial arts record from Sherdog

Josh Shockley (born November 15, 1989) is an American mixed martial artist currently competing in the lightweight division. A professional competitor since 2007, Shockley has also previously competed for the UFC and Bellator.

== Mixed martial arts career ==
=== Early career ===
Shockley had first amateur mixed martial arts fight at the age of 16, having falsely told the promotion that he was 18. Shockley won his first six professional bouts and ended the majority of them via stoppage in the first round.

=== Bellator ===
Shockley was originally set to make his Bellator debut on March 12, 2011, against Kalvin Hackney at Bellator 36. However, when Toby Imada's opponent refused to weigh in, Shockley was moved up to the main card to face Imada in the quarterfinals of Bellator's season four lightweight tournament. He lost via first-round armbar submission.

Shockley then faced Eric Moon at Bellator 57 on November 12, 2011. Shockley won the bout via guillotine choke submission in the first round.

Shockley fought and defeated UFC veteran Shamar Bailey via unanimous decision at Bellator 60 on March 9, 2012.

In what would be his last fight for the promotion, Shockley fought Keith Schneider at Bellator 70 on May 25, 2012. Shockley lost the fight via armbar submission in the opening minute of round one.

=== Post-Bellator ===
Shockley faced Mike Cannon on November 10, 2012, at Hoosier Fight Club 13. Shockley easily defeated Cannon via submission in the first round, resulting in the crowd erupting with laughter as Cannon tapped for what appeared to be his life. Afterwards, Cannon began teaching women's cardio kickboxing in order to improve his performance in the cage, as a way to come back from his embarrassing 1st round loss.

Shockley was expected to face Micah Miller at HFC 15 on April 6, 2013. The bout, however, was cancelled for unknown reasons.

The bout with Micah Miller ended up taking place at Hoosier Fight Club 16 on June 1, 2013. He won the fight via unanimous decision.

=== Ultimate Fighting Championship ===
Shockley signed with the UFC in May 2014.

In his UFC debut, Shockley faced Jason Saggo at UFC 174 on June 14, 2014. Shockley lost the fight via TKO in round one.

Shockley was expected to face Fabrício Camões at UFC 179 on October 25, 2014. However, Shockley pulled out of the bout citing injury and was replaced by Tony Martin.

Shockley faced Ivan Jorge on February 22, 2015, at UFC Fight Night 61. He lost the fight via unanimous decision and was subsequently released from the promotion.

== Mixed martial arts record ==
Professional record breakdown
15 matches	11 wins	4 losses
By knockout	3	1
By submission	5	2
By decision	3	1

Res.	Record	Opponent	Method	Event	Date	Round	Time	Location	Notes
Loss	11–4	Ivan Jorge	Decision (unanimous)	UFC Fight Night: Bigfoot vs. Mir	February 22, 2015	3	5:00	Porto Alegre, Brazil	
Loss	11–3	Jason Saggo	TKO (punches)	UFC 174	June 14, 2014	1	4:57	Vancouver, British Columbia, Canada	
Win	11–2	Micah Miller	Decision (unanimous)	Hoosier Fight Club 16	June 1, 2013	3	5:00	Valparaiso, Indiana, United States	
Win	10–2	Mike Cannon	Submission (rear-naked choke)	Hoosier Fight Club 13	November 10, 2012	1	3:23	Valparaiso, Indiana, United States	
Loss	9–2	Keith Schneider	Submission (armbar)	Bellator 70	May 25, 2012	1	0:59	New Orleans, Louisiana, United States	Catchweight (173 lbs) bout.
Win	9–1	Shamar Bailey	Decision (unanimous)	Bellator 60	March 9, 2012	3	5:00	Hammond, Indiana, United States	Catchweight (165 lbs) bout.
Win	8–1	Eric Moon	Submission (guillotine choke)	Bellator 57	November 12, 2011	1	0:35	Rama, Ontario, Canada	
Win	7–1	Mike Santiago	Submission (rear-naked choke)	Chicago Cagefighting Championship 4	October 15, 2011	1	2:18	Villa Park, Illinois, United States	Catchweight (160 lbs) bout.
Loss	6–1	Toby Imada	Submission (armbar)	Bellator 36	March 12, 2011	1	1:19	Shreveport, Louisiana, United States	Bellator season four lightweight tournament quarterfinal.
Win	6–0	Jeff Green	Decision (unanimous)	Duneland Classic 6	September 12, 2009	3	5:00	Crown Point, Indiana, United States	
Win	5–0	Vener Galiev	Submission (armbar)	fightFORCE: Day of Anger	February 28, 2009	1	1:15	St. Petersburg, Russia	
Win	4–0	Zachariah Konkle	TKO (slam)	C3: Domination	November 22, 2008	1	0:15	Hammond, Indiana, United States	
Win	3–0	Adam Langwinski	Submission	Duneland Classic 5	May 31, 2008	1	N/A	Valparaiso, Indiana, United States	
Win	2–0	Dylan Sprawl	TKO (punches)	Total Fight Challenge 8	April 28, 2007	1	0:41	Hammond, Indiana, United States	
Win	1–0	Morgan Rapp	KO (punch)	Cage Rage: Boot Scootin' Brawl	January 27, 2007	1	1:28	Lafayette, Indiana, United States	

== See also ==
- List of current UFC fighters
- List of male mixed martial artists
