= Jessy Miele =

American female mixed martial arts fighter

Jessica Miele
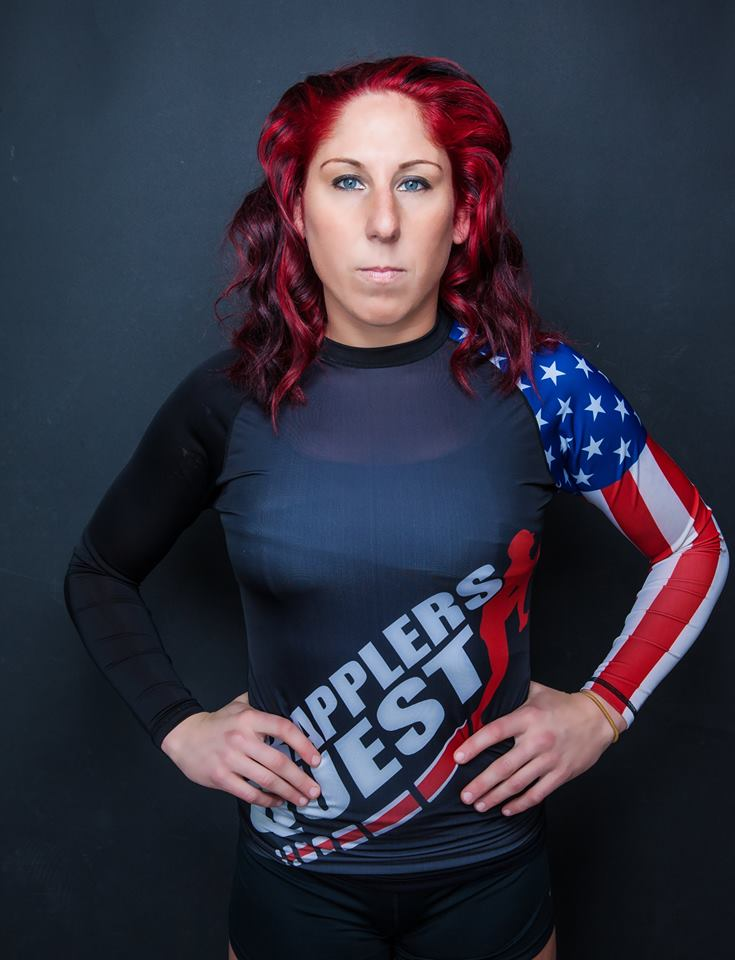
- Born: March 28, 1985 (age 41); Waterbury, Connecticut, United States
- Other names: The Widowmaker
- Height: 5 ft 6 in (1.68 m)
- Weight: 145 lb (66 kg; 10 st 5 lb)
- Division: Featherweight
- Reach: 69.0 in (175 cm)
- Fighting out of: Waterbury, Connecticut
- Team: IMB Academy of CT; Triton Athletics
- Years active: 2014–present

Mixed martial arts record
- Total: 15
- Wins: 9
- By knockout: 2
- By submission: 4
- By decision: 3
- Losses: 6
- By knockout: 1
- By submission: 1
- By decision: 4

Other information
- Mixed martial arts record from Sherdog

Jessica Miele is an American female mixed martial artist who competes in the Featherweight. She has formerly competed for Bellator MMA. Fight Matrix within the top #10 Women's Featherweight from January 2015 till October 2015. Sherdog had her ranked within the top 10 Female Featherweight's since January 2020, rising as high as #7.

== Background ==
Born in Waterbury, CT she is the oldest of 3 children. Growing up Jessy played several sports such as soccer, softball and basketball. While she attended University of Massachusetts, she participated in rugby and break dancing. After college she started to look for something to keep her active and found her way to Brazilian jiu-jitsu and eventually to Mixed Martial Arts.

Outside of fighting, she is the multimedia director for Post University.

== Mixed martial arts career ==
=== Early career ===
With a record of 8–3 on the regional scene, Miele most notably fought the likes fought Ultimate Fighter Season 18 contestant Peggy Morgan, Invicta FC title contender Charmaine Tweet, and defeated former UFC fighter Elizabeth Phillips. She also won the GC Featherweight Championship, defending the title once, and the RF Bantamweight Championship. In her two wins before the Bellator contract, she defeated touted prospect Kylie O’Hearn at CES 54 via TKO and split decision against Elizabeth Phillips at CES 56.

=== Bellator MMA ===
Miele made her Bellator debut against Talita Nogueira at Bellator 231 on October 25, 2019. She won a close bout via split decision.

Miele was expected to face Leslie Smith at Bellator 241 on March 13, 2020. However, the whole event was eventually cancelled due to the prevailing COVID-19 pandemic.

Miele faced Julia Budd on August 21, 2020, at Bellator 234. She lost the bout via unanimous decision.

Miele faced Janay Harding at Bellator 251 on November 5, 2020. She lost the bout via unanimous decision.

=== BTC Fight Promotions ===
Miele faced Sarah Kaufman on November 20, 2021, at BTC 13: Power. She lost the bout via TKO due to ground and pound in the first round.

== Championships and accomplishments ==
=== Mixed Martial Arts ===
- Gladiator Challenge
  - GC Featherweight Championship
    - One successful title defence
- Reality Fighting
  - RF Bantamweight Championship
- Fight Matrix
  - 2014 Female Rookie of the Year

== Mixed martial arts record ==
Professional record breakdown
15 matches	9 wins	6 losses
By knockout	2	1
By submission	4	1
By decision	3	4

Res.	Record	Opponent	Method	Event	Date	Round	Time	Location	Notes
Loss	9–6	Sarah Kaufman	TKO (punches)	BTC 13: Power	November 20, 2021	1	3:56	St Catharines, Canada	
Loss	9–5	Janay Harding	Decision (unanimous)	Bellator 251	November 5, 2020	3	5:00	Uncasville, Connecticut, United States	
Loss	9–4	Julia Budd	Decision (unanimous)	Bellator 244	August 21, 2020	3	5:00	Uncasville, Connecticut, United States	Catchweight (147 lbs) bout; Miele missed weight.
Win	9–3	Talita Nogueira	Decision (split)	Bellator 231	October 25, 2019	3	5:00	Uncasville, Connecticut, United States	
Win	8–3	Elizabeth Phillips	Decision (split)	CES 56	May 31, 2019	3	5:00	Hartford, Connecticut, United States	
Win	7–3	Kylie O'Hearn	TKO (punches)	CES 54	January 19, 2019	3	4:27	Lincoln, Rhode Island, United States	
Win	6–3	Calie Cutler	Submission (rear-naked choke)	Reality Fighting: Mohegan Fight Night 13	January 7, 2017	2	4:38	Uncasville, Connecticut, United States	Won the vacant RF Bantamweight Championship. Bantamweight bout.
Loss	5–3	Charmaine Tweet	Decision (unanimous)	Prestige FC 2	March 12, 2016	5	5:00	Regina, Canada	For the vacant Prestige Fight Club Featherweight Championship.
Win	5–2	Jamie Driver	Submission (rear-naked choke)	Reality Fighting: New Year's Bash 4	January 2, 2016	2	2:01	Uncasville, Connecticut, United States	
Loss	4–2	Peggy Morgan	Decision (unanimous)	CES 30	August 14, 2015	3	5:00	Lincoln, Rhode Island, United States	
Win	4–1	Janice Meyer	TKO (punches)	Reality Fighting: Mohegan Fight Night 11	June 19, 2015	1	1:51	Uncasville, Connecticut, United States	Catchweight (140 lb) bout.
Win	3–1	Lissette Neri	Decision (split)	Gladiator Challenge: Holiday Beatings	December 20, 2014	3	5:00	El Cajon, California, United States	Defended the GC Featherweight Championship.
Win	2–1	Lissette Neri	Submission (rear-naked choke)	Gladiator Challenge: Aftershock	October 25, 2014	1	3:25	San Diego, California, United States	Won the GC Featherweight Championship.
Win	1–1	Cassie Crisano	Submission (armbar)	Premier FC 17	September 20, 2014	2	4:59	Worcester, Massachusetts, United States	Catchweight (140 lb) bout.
Loss	0–1	Andria Wawro	Submission (rear-naked choke)	Reality Fighting: Mohegan Fight Night 10	June 6, 2014	1	0:19	Uncasville, Connecticut, United States	Featherweight debut.

== See also ==
- List of female mixed martial artists
