= Kelly Faszholz =

American mixed martial arts fighter

- Born: April 9, 1984 (age 42); Dallas, United States
- Height: 5 ft 8 in (1.73 m)
- Weight: 135 lb (61 kg; 9 st 9 lb)
- Division: Bantamweight
- Reach: 67.0 in (170 cm)
- Style: Brazilian jiu-jitsu
- Fighting out of: Santa Rosa, California
- Team: Nor-Cal Fighting Alliance
- Years active: 2013–present

Mixed martial arts record
- Total: 6
- Wins: 4
- By submission: 3
- By decision: 1
- Losses: 2
- By knockout: 1
- By decision: 1

Other information
- Mixed martial arts record from Sherdog

Kelly Faszholz (born April 9, 1984) is an American female mixed martial artist who most notably competed in the Bantamweight division of the Ultimate Fighting Championship.

== Mixed martial arts career ==
=== Early career ===
Kelly is a BJJ purple belt from Dallas, Texas, now training out of the Nor-Cal Fighting Alliance, former home of UFC vet David Mitchell and home to UFC vets Nate Loughran and Collin Hart and Strikeforce vet Alvin Cacdac under former UFC middleweight title contender David Terrell. She came to the UFC with a 3–0 record as a pro and at least two amateur fights. All her wins were via submission. Outside of MMA, she has a long history of competition as a grappler, both gi and no-gi.

=== Ultimate Fighting Championship ===
Faszholz made her UFC debut against Lauren Murphy on February 21, 2016, at UFC Fight Night: Cowboy vs. Cowboy. She lost the fight via TKO due to punches and elbows in the final seconds of the third round. The fight earned Kelly a Fight of the Night bonus award.

Kelly faced UFC newcomer Ketlen Vieira on October 1, 2016, at UFC Fight Night: Lineker vs. Dodson in Portland, Oregon, United States. She lost a close fight by split decision.

=== Invicta FC ===
After her last fight, she was released from the UFC and was signed to Invicta FC.

Kelly fought fellow UFC vet Elizabeth Phillips at Invicta FC 23: Porto vs. Niedźwiedź on May 20, 2017. Phillips missed weight by 5 pounds and the fight was held at 140 lbs, with 20% of Phillip's purse going to Kelly. She won the fight via unanimous decision.

== Personal life ==
Kelly earned a BA Degree in Kinesiology after attending Texas Woman's University and University of North Texas.

== Championships and accomplishments ==
=== Mixed martial arts ===
- Ultimate Fighting Championship
  - Fight of the Night (One time) vs. Lauren Murphy
- Prize FC
  - Prize FC Featherweight Championship (One time)
- Sparta Combat League
  - SCL Bantamweight Championship (One time)

== Mixed martial arts record ==
Professional record breakdown
6 matches	4 wins	2 losses
By knockout	0	1
By submission	3	0
By decision	1	1

Res.	Record	Opponent	Method	Event	Date	Round	Time	Location	Notes
Win	4–2	Elizabeth Phillips	Decision (unanimous)	Invicta FC 23: Porto vs. Niedźwiedź	May 20, 2017	3	5:00	Kansas City, Missouri, United States	Catchweight (140 lb) bout; Phillips missed weight.
Loss	3–2	Ketlen Vieira	Decision (split)	UFC Fight Night: Lineker vs. Dodson	October 1, 2016	3	5:00	Portland, Oregon, United States	
Loss	3–1	Lauren Murphy	TKO (elbows and punches)	UFC Fight Night: Cowboy vs. Cowboy	February 21, 2016	3	4:55	Pittsburgh, Pennsylvania, United States	Fight of the Night.
Win	3–0	Brittney Elkin	Submission (rear-naked choke)	Prize Fighting Championship 12	November 6, 2015	2	3:48	Denver, Colorado, United States	Won vacant Prize FC Featherweight Championship.
Win	2–0	Summer Bradshaw	Submission (guillotine choke)	SCL 42	July 18, 2015	3	1:55	Castle Rock, Colorado, United States	Won SCL Bantamweight Championship.
Win	1–0	Kristen Gatz	Submission (rear-naked choke)	Nor-Cal Conflict	June 22, 2013	1	2:11	Santa Rosa, California, United States	

== See also ==
- List of current UFC fighters
- List of female mixed martial artists
