= Charmaine Tweet =

Canadian mixed martial arts fighter

- Born: April 30, 1977 (age 49); Regina, Saskatchewan, Canada
- Other names: Not So Sweet
- Height: 6 ft 0 in (1.83 m)
- Weight: 145 lb (66 kg; 10.4 st)
- Division: Featherweight
- Style: Muay Thai

Kickboxing record
- Total: 12
- Wins: 10
- Losses: 1
- Draws: 1

Mixed martial arts record
- Total: 15
- Wins: 9
- By knockout: 3
- By submission: 5
- By decision: 1
- Losses: 6
- By knockout: 3
- By submission: 1
- By decision: 2

Other information
- Mixed martial arts record from Sherdog

Charmaine Tweet is a Canadian mixed martial artist who competes in the Featherweight division. She is currently signed with Invicta FC.

== Kickboxing career ==
Tweet began training with kickboxer Duke Roufus in 2001 and stayed with his team until 2005. Her current kickboxing record is 10 wins, 1 loss and 1 draw.

== Mixed martial arts career ==
=== Early career ===
In June 2011, Tweet made her professional MMA debut, losing to future UFC Women's Bantamweight champion Ronda Rousey. Over the next two years, Tweet would build her record to 4 wins and 3 losses before signing to Invicta FC.

After the loss to Cyborg Tweet returned to Canada to fight with Prestige FC. She had rematch with Anna Barone at Prestige FC 1, finishing her in the first round.

She was then set to fight Jessy Miele for the vacant Prestige FC Featherweight Championship. She won via unanimous decision.

=== Invicta FC ===
In her promotional debut in December 2013, Tweet faced Julia Budd at Invicta FC 7. She lost the fight by unanimous decision.

Tweet returned to the promotion on September 6, 2014 to face Veronica Rothenhausler at Invicta FC 8. She won the fight via TKO in the first round.

Tweet next faced Cris Cyborg on February 27, 2015 for the Featherweight title at Invicta FC 11. She lost the fight via TKO in the first round.

Tweet returned at Invicta FC 17 to take on the undefeated Latoya Walker. She won via TKO in the first round.

== Championships and accomplishments ==
=== Kickboxing ===
- 2009 – IFMA World Championships, Light Middleweight
- 2010 IKF World Classic – IKF World Championships, Welterweight

=== Mixed martial arts ===
- Prestige FC
  - Prestige FC Women's Featherweight Championship

== Mixed martial arts record ==
Professional record breakdown
15 matches	9 wins	6 losses
By knockout	3	3
By submission	5	1
By decision	1	2

Res.	Record	Opponent	Method	Event	Date	Round	Time	Location	Notes
Loss	9–6	Megan Anderson	TKO (punches and head kick)	Invicta FC 21: Anderson vs. Tweet	14 January 2017	2	2:05	Kansas City, Missouri, United States	For the interim Invicta FC Featherweight Championship.
Win	9–5	Latoya Walker	TKO (spinning back fist)	Invicta FC 17: Evinger vs. Schneider	7 May 2016	1	3:41	Costa Mesa, California, United States	
Win	8–5	Jessy Miele	Decision (unanimous)	Prestige FC 2: Queen City Coronation	12 March 2016	5	5:00	Regina, Saskatchewan, Canada	Won the Prestige FC Featherweight Championship.
Win	7–5	Anna Barone	TKO (retirement)	Prestige FC 1: Atonement	24 October 2015	1	3:41	Weyburn, Saskatchewan, Canada	
Loss	6–5	Cris Cyborg	TKO (punches)	Invicta FC 11: Cyborg vs. Tweet	27 February 2015	1	0:46	Los Angeles, California, United States	For the Invicta FC Featherweight Championship.
Win	6–4	Veronica Rothenhausler	TKO (punches)	Invicta FC 8: Waterson vs. Tamada	6 September 2014	1	4:05	Kansas City, Missouri, United States	
Win	5–4	Anna Barone	Submission (rear-naked choke)	MMA Fight Night 2	21 May 2014	1	3:15	Montreal, Quebec, Canada	
Loss	4–4	Julia Budd	Decision (unanimous)	Invicta FC 7: Honchak vs. Smith	7 December 2013	3	5:00	Kansas City, Missouri, United States	
Win	4–3	Amanda Bell	Submission (rear-naked choke)	BFTB 2 - Redemption	1 June 2013	1	4:18	Cranbrook, British Columbia, Canada	
Win	3–3	Sy Jewett	Submission (rear-naked choke)	AFC 15 - The Ides	15 March 2013	1	2:25	Calgary, Alberta, Canada	
Win	2–3	Puja Kadian	Submission (guillotine choke)	SFL 10	23 November 2012	1	0:45	Mumbai, India	
Loss	1–3	Adrienne Seiber	Decision (split)	HKFC - School of Hard Knocks 25	15 June 2012	3	5:00	Medicine Hat, Alberta, Canada	
Win	1–2	Marshelle Weinberger	Submission (guillotine choke)	HKFC - School of Hard Knocks 20	24 February 2012	1	1:19	Calgary, Alberta, Canada	
Loss	0–2	Anna Barone	KO (punches)	BEP 5 - Breast Cancer Beatdown	1 October 2011	1	0:18	Fletcher, North Carolina, United States	
Loss	0–1	Ronda Rousey	Submission (armbar)	HKFC - School of Hard Knocks 12	17 June 2011	1	0:49	Calgary, Alberta, Canada	Catchweight (150 lbs) bout.

== Kickboxing record ==
Kickboxing record
13 wins (9 KOs), 2 losses, 0 draws
Date	Result	Opponent	Event	Location	Method	Round	Time	Record
2018-02-27	Loss	(New Zealand) Genah Fabian		Pleasanton, CA, United States	KO	2		
Fought for the WMC World Middleweightweight (−66.0 kg/145 lb) Full Contact Championship.
Legend: Win Loss Draw/No contest Notes
