= UFC 174 =

UFC mixed martial arts event in 2014

UFC 174: Johnson vs. Bagautinov
- The poster for UFC 174: Johnson vs. Bagautinov
- Promotion: Ultimate Fighting Championship
- Date: June 14, 2014
- Venue: Rogers Arena
- City: Vancouver, British Columbia, Canada
- Attendance: 13,506
- Total gate: $1.14 million
- Buyrate: 115,000

Event chronology
UFC Fight Night: Henderson vs. Khabilov	UFC 174: Johnson vs. Bagautinov	UFC Fight Night: Te Huna vs. Marquardt

UFC 174: Johnson vs. Bagautinov was a mixed martial arts event that took place on June 14, 2014, at Rogers Arena in Vancouver, British Columbia, Canada.

== Background ==
The event was headlined by a UFC Flyweight Championship bout between the current champion Demetrious Johnson and challenger Ali Bagautinov. Subsequent to this event, on July 10, the British Columbia Athletic Commission (BCAC) announced that Bagautinov tested positive for erythropoietin (EPO) prior to the title fight. In response, the BCAC has suspended him for mixed martial arts competition for one year.

This was the third UFC event held at the Rogers Arena, with the first being UFC 115 on June 12, 2010 (with the venue still being called General Motors Place at the time) and the second UFC 131 on June 11, 2011.

Germaine de Randamie was scheduled to face Milana Dudieva at the event. However, de Randamie was removed from the card due to an alleged visa issue restricting her travel to Canada. Promotional newcomer Valérie Létourneau was then scheduled to face Dudieva. In turn, Dudieva pulled out of the bout as well and was replaced by Elizabeth Phillips.

Unlike other recent events the preliminary card was shown on FX instead of Fox Sports 1.

== Results ==
Main card
Weight class				Method	Round	Time	Notes
Flyweight	Demetrious Johnson (c)	def.	Ali Bagautinov	Decision (unanimous) (50–45, 50–45, 50–45)	5	5:00	(Note: For the UFC Flyweight Championship. Ali Bagautinov tested positive for erythropoietin.)
Welterweight	Rory MacDonald	def.	Tyron Woodley	Decision (unanimous) (30–27, 30–27, 30–27)	3	5:00
Light Heavyweight	Ryan Bader	def.	Rafael Cavalcante	Decision (unanimous) (30–27, 30–27, 30–27)	3	5:00
Heavyweight	Andrei Arlovski	def.	Brendan Schaub	Decision (split) (28–29, 29–28, 29–28)	3	5:00
Light Heavyweight	Ovince Saint Preux	def.	Ryan Jimmo	Submission (kimura)	2	2:10
Preliminary card (FX)
Welterweight	Kiichi Kunimoto	def.	Daniel Sarafian	Submission (rear-naked choke)	1	2:52
Women's Bantamweight	Valérie Létourneau	def.	Elizabeth Phillips	Decision (split) (28–29, 29–28, 29–28)	3	5:00
Bantamweight	Yves Jabouin	def.	Mike Easton	Decision (unanimous) (29–28, 29–28, 29–28)	3	5:00
Lightweight	Tae Hyun Bang	def.	Kajan Johnson	KO (punch)	3	2:01
Preliminary card (UFC Fight Pass)
Bantamweight	Michinori Tanaka	def.	Roland Delorme	Decision (unanimous) (30–27, 30–27, 30–27)	3	5:00
Lightweight	Jason Saggo	def.	Josh Shockley	TKO (punches)	1	4:57

== Bonus awards ==
The following fighters received $50,000 bonuses:

- Fight of the Night: Tae Hyun Bang vs. Kajan Johnson
- Performance of the Night: Tae Hyun Bang and Kiichi Kunimoto

== See also ==
- List of UFC events
- 2014 in UFC
