= 2017 in Bellator MMA =

Mixed martial arts events

Information
- Promotion: Bellator MMA
- First date aired: January 21, 2017
- Last date aired: December 15, 2017

2017 in Bellator MMA was the tenth year in the history of Bellator MMA, a mixed martial arts promotion based in the United States. Bellator held 26 events in 2017.

== Background ==
This year, Bellator announced their first MMA event to be held in New York: Bellator NYC. The event would also mark the Bellator debuts of former UFC commentator Mike Goldberg, calling his first card on Spike TV since 2011 (which was the televised portion of Bellator NYC, referred to as Bellator 180), and former Strikeforce commentator Mauro Ranallo.

== Bellator 170 ==
Bellator 170: Ortiz vs. Sonnen
- Date: January 21, 2017
- Venue: The Forum
- City: Inglewood, California
- Attendance: 11,972
- Total gate: $1,134,963

Bellator 170: Ortiz vs. Sonnen took place on January 21, 2017, at The Forum in Inglewood, California. The event aired live in prime time on Spike TV, drawing 1.4 million viewers.

Background

On October 18, 2016, it was announced that former UFC Light Heavyweight Champion Tito Ortiz and UFC veteran Chael Sonnen would headline this event. Sonnen owns career wins over the likes of Yushin Okami, Nate Marquardt, Brian Stann, former UFC Light Heavyweight Champion Maurício Rua and former UFC Middleweight Champion Michael Bisping. Ortiz is a UFC Hall of Famer and one of the most decorated champions in UFC history. "The Huntington Beach Bad Boy" signed with Bellator in 2013 and has gone 2–1 with the promotion. He has wins over the likes of Alexander Shlemenko, Stephan Bonnar, Wanderlei Silva, Ken Shamrock and Forrest Griffin.

A women's bout between Rebecca Ruth and Colleen Schneider was initially announced for this card. However, the bout never came to fruition for undisclosed reasons and Ruth was replaced by Chrissie Daniels

Results

Fight card
Weight class				Method	Round	Time	Notes
Light Heavyweight	Tito Ortiz	def.	Chael Sonnen	Submission (rear-naked choke)	1	2:03
Welterweight	Paul Daley	def.	Brennan Ward	KO (flying knee)	1	2:27
Middleweight	Hisaki Kato	def.	Ralek Gracie	Decision (unanimous) (29–28, 29–28, 30–27)	3	5:00
Featherweight	Emmanuel Sanchez	def.	Georgi Karakhanyan	Decision (majority) (28–28, 28–27, 28–27)	3	5:00	(Note: Sanchez was deducted a point for a knee to a grounded opponent)
Catchweight (161 lb)	Derek Campos	def.	Derek Anderson	Decision (unanimous) (29–28, 29–28, 29–28)	3	5:00
Preliminary card (Spike.com)
Welterweight	Guilherme Vasconcelos	def.	John Mercurio	KO (punches)	2	0:41
Middleweight	Kevin Casey	vs.	Keith Berry	Draw (majority) (29–27, 28–28, 28–28)	3	5:00
Featherweight	Alex Soto	def.	DeMarcus Brown	Decision (unanimous) (29–28, 29–28, 29–28)	3	5:00
Featherweight	Chinzo Machida	def.	Jamar Ocampo	TKO (punch)	3	3:48
Lightweight	Jalin Turner	def.	Gabriel Green	KO (punches)	1	0:36
Heavyweight	Jack May	def.	Dave Cryer	TKO (punches)	1	0:41
Catchweight (182 lb)	Daniel Rodriguez	def.	Christian Gonzalez	TKO (punches)	2	3:55
Postliminary card (Dark Bouts)
Catchweight (158 lb)	Jacob Rosales	def.	Ian Butler	TKO (punches)	2	2:45
Lightweight	Mike Segura	def.	Tommy Aaron	TKO (punches)	1	1:02
Bantamweight	James Barnes	def.	Rob Gooch	Submission (inverted triangle choke)	1	4:36
Welterweight	Curtis Millender	def.	Johnny Cisneros	TKO (strikes)	2	3:48
Women's Catchweight (129 lb)	Colleen Schneider	def.	Chrissie Daniels	Submission (anaconda choke)	1	1:30
Featherweight	Henry Corrales	def.	Cody Bollinger	KO (punch to the body)	3	4:28

== Bellator 171 ==
Bellator 171 Guillard vs. Njokuani
- Date: January 27, 2017
- Venue: Kansas Star Casino
- City: Mulvane, Kansas, USA
- Attendance: 3,206
- Total gate: $211,082

Bellator 171: Guillard vs. Njokuani was held on January 27, 2017, at the Kansas Star Casino in Mulvane, Kansas. The event aired live in prime time on Spike TV.

Background

The event was headlined by catchweight at 179 pounds bout between UFC veteran Melvin Guillard and Chidi Njokuani.

The co-main event featured a lightweight bout between local favorite David Rickels and Aaron Derrow.

Additionally, prospects and former collegiate heavyweight wrestling stars Jarod Trice and Tyrell Fortune were featured on the undercard. Trice, a three-time All-American wrestler at Central Michigan University, faced Kevin Woltkamp. Fortune, a former NCAA Division 2 champion, faced Will Johnson.

Results

Fight card
Weight class				Method	Round	Time	Notes
Catchweight (179 lb)	Chidi Njokuani	def.	Melvin Guillard	Decision (unanimous) (30–25, 30–24, 30–26)	3	5:00
Welterweight	David Rickels	def.	Aaron Derrow	TKO (punches)	3	0:44
Women's Flyweight	Jessica Middleton	def.	Alice Yauger	Decision (unanimous) (29–28, 30–26, 30–26)	3	5:00
Featherweight	A.J. McKee	def.	Brandon Phillips	Decision (unanimous) (29–28, 29–28, 30–27)	3	5:00
Preliminary card (Spike.com)
Featherweight	Justin Overton	def.	Gaston Reyno	Submission (rear-naked choke)	2	0:34
Catchweight (187 lb)	Jordan Young	def.	Chris Harris	Decision (unanimous) (30–26, 30–27, 30–27)	3	5:00
Heavyweight	Tyrell Fortune	def.	Will Johnson	TKO (punches)	2	4:27
Heavyweight	Jarod Trice	def.	Kevin Woltkamp	KO (punches)	2	3:17
Women's Flyweight	Bruna Ellen	def.	Carmella James	Decision (unanimous) (29–28, 30–27, 30–27)	3	5:00
Postliminary card (Dark Bouts)
Welterweight	Dominic Garcia	def.	Will Lavine	Submission (triangle choke)	2	2:08
Welterweight	Chance Rencountre	def.	Jake Lindsey	Decision (split)	3	5:00
Bantamweight	Johnny Marigo	def.	Joe Fulk	TKO (punches)	1	1:23
Welterweight	Manny Meraz	def.	Scott Heston	Decision (unanimous)	3	5:00
Lightweight	Mike Breeden	def.	Craig Fairley	TKO (knee injury)	1	4:38

== Bellator 172 ==
Bellator 172: Thomson vs. Pitbull
- Date: February 18, 2017
- Venue: SAP Center
- City: San Jose, California
- Attendance: 7,273
- Total gate: $818,213

Bellator 172: Thomson vs. Pitbull aired on Saturday, February 18, 2017, at the SAP Center in San Jose, California. The event aired live in prime time on Spike TV.

Background

The event was scheduled to be headlined by heavyweight legend Fedor Emelianenko against former UFC veteran Matt Mitrione. Emelianenko retired in 2012, but ultimately returned to the sport in 2015. This was to be Emelianenko's first fight in the U.S. since 2011. Mitrione, a 38-year-old former NFL player has scored back-to-back knockout victories since joining Bellator over Carl Seumanutafa and Oli Thompson. Hours before the event, the fight was cancelled due to Mitrione becoming ill. As a result, Josh Thomson vs. Patricky Pitbull was moved up to the main event.

Results

Fight card
Weight class				Method	Round	Time	Notes
Lightweight	Patricky Pitbull	def.	Josh Thomson	KO (punch)	2	0:40
Heavyweight	Cheick Kongo	def.	Oli Thompson	Decision (unanimous) (30–26, 30–25, 30–25)	3	5:00
Catchweight (187 lb)	Anatoly Tokov	def.	Francisco France	TKO (punches)	2	2:24
Women's Flyweight	Veta Arteaga	def.	Brooke Mayo	TKO (doctor stoppage)	3	4:04
Welterweight	Mauricio Alonso	def.	Josh Koscheck	TKO (punches)	1	4:42
Preliminary card (Spike.com)
Lightweight	Nikko Jackson	def.	Cesar Gonzalez	Decision (unanimous) (29–28, 30–27, 30–27)	3	5:00
Catchweight (166 lb)	J.J. Okanovich	def.	Zach Andrews	Submission (rear-naked choke)	2	2:26
Bantamweight	Justin Tenedora	def.	Roque Reyes	Submission (face crank)	2	4:59
Welterweight	James Terry	def.	JC Llamas	Decision (technical) (30–27, 30–27, 30–27)	3	0:37
Featherweight	Gaston Bolanos	def.	Abner Perez	TKO (punches)	1	4:53
Heavyweight	Giant Gonzalez	vs.	Diego Herzog	Draw (majority) (27–28, 28–28, 28–28)	3	5:00
Postliminary card (Dark Bouts)
Featherweight	Juan Cardenas	def.	Luis Vargas	Submission (rear-naked choke)	1	4:12
Flyweight	Bobby Escalante	def.	Anthony Do	Submission (choke)	1	1:40
Catchweight (131 lb)	Jeremy Murphy	def.	Matt Ramirez	TKO (punches)	3	1:41
Welterweight	Abraham Vaesau	def.	Dominic Sumner	KO (punch)	1	4:15

== Bellator 173 ==
Bellator 173 McGeary vs. McDermott
- Date: February 24, 2017
- Venue: SSE Arena
- City: Belfast, Northern Ireland
- Attendance: 10,461
- Total gate: 728,042€ (IEP) $980,719 (USD)

Bellator 173: McGeary vs. McDermott was held on February 24, 2017, at the SSE Arena in Belfast, Northern Ireland. The event aired live in prime time on Spike TV.

Background

The event was originally scheduled to be headlined by a bout between Liam McGeary and Chris Fields. However, on February 20, it was announced that Fields had to withdraw from the match due to injury. The initial replacement for Fields was announced as Bellator newcomer Vladimir Filipovic. However, Filipovic also was pulled from the bout due to visa issues. McGeary eventually faced Bellator newcomer Brett McDermott.

The event was a dual promotion event as Bellator's card was co-promoted with BAMMA 28.

Results

Fight card
Weight class				Method	Round	Time	Notes
Catchweight (217 lb)	Liam McGeary	def.	Brett McDermott	TKO (doctor stoppage)	2	1:06
Featherweight	James Gallagher	def.	Kirill Medvedovsky	Submission (rear-naked choke)	1	2:53
Women's Catchweight (140 lb)	Iony Razafiarison	def.	Sinead Kavanagh	Decision (unanimous) (30–27, 30–26, 30–25)	3	5:00
Welterweight	Alex Lohore	def.	Colin Fletcher	Submission (rear-naked choke)	2	2:42
Featherweight	Shay Walsh	def.	James McErlean	Decision (unanimous) (29–28, 29–28, 29–28)	3	5:00

== Bellator 174 ==
Bellator 174 Coenen vs. Budd
- Date: March 3, 2017
- Venue: WinStar World Casino
- City: Thackerville, Oklahoma
- Attendance: 1,211
- Total gate: $104,342

Bellator 174: Coenen vs. Budd was held on March 3, 2017, at the WinStar World Casino in Thackerville, Oklahoma. The event aired live in prime time on Spike TV.

Background

The main event featured Marloes Coenen versus Julia Budd for the inaugural Bellator women's featherweight title. This was the first time a woman's bout has headlined a Bellator card.

Kendall Grove was originally scheduled to face Chris Honeycutt at this event. However, Honeycutt was removed from the bout on February 28 and replaced by three-time UFC veteran and Bellator newcomer Mike Rhodes. Rhodes then failed to make weight and the fight was cancelled.

Joe Taimanglo was scheduled to face Steve Garcia on this card. However, the fight was removed from the card after Taimanglo missed weight.

Results

Fight card
Weight class				Method	Round	Time	Notes
Women's Featherweight	Julia Budd	def.	Marloes Coenen	TKO (punches)	4	2:42	(Note: For the inaugural Bellator Women's Featherweight Championship.)
Catchweight (174 lb)	Fernando Gonzalez	def.	Brandon Girtz	Decision (unanimous) (29–28, 29–27, 30–26)	3	5:00
Heavyweight	Justin Wren	def.	Roman Pizzolato	Submission (arm-triangle choke)	1	2:35
Catchweight (194 lb)	Rafael Lovato Jr.	def.	Charles Hackmann	TKO (knees and punches)	1	0:13
Preliminary card (Spike.com)
Catchweight (150 lb)	Emmanuel Rivera	def.	Treston Thomison	Decision (unanimous) (30–26, 30–27, 30–27)	3	5:00
Lightweight	Cody Pfister	def.	Jonathan Gary	Submission (rear-naked choke)	1	4:04
Women's Flyweight	Emily Ducote	def.	Katy Collins	Submission (rear-naked choke)	1	4:53
Women's Featherweight	Gabrielle Holloway	def.	Alexis Dufresne	TKO (punches)	2	2:53
Catchweight (174 lb)	Justin Patterson	def.	Jason Witt	TKO (punches)	3	0:13

== Bellator 175 ==
Bellator 175 Rampage vs. King Mo 2
- Date: March 31, 2017
- Venue: Allstate Arena
- City: Rosemont, Illinois
- Attendance: 11,807
- Total gate: $1,033,113

Bellator 175: Rampage vs. King Mo 2 was held on March 31, 2017, at the Allstate Arena in Rosemont, Illinois. The event aired live in prime time on Spike TV.

Background

The event was headlined by Heavyweight bout between former UFC Light Heavyweight Champion Quinton Jackson against former Strikeforce Light Heavyweight Champion Muhammed Lawal.

At the weigh ins, Emmanuel Sanchez missed the 146-pound featherweight limit, coming in at 149.5 pounds. The fight was changed to a catchweight.

Results

Fight card
Weight class				Method	Round	Time	Notes
Heavyweight	Muhammed Lawal	def.	Quinton Jackson	Decision (unanimous) (29–28, 29–28, 29–28)	3	5:00
Catchweight (149 lb)	Emmanuel Sanchez	def.	Marcos Galvao	Decision (unanimous) (30–27, 30–27, 30–27)	3	5:00
Heavyweight	Sergei Kharitonov	def.	Chase Gormley	KO (punch)	1	3:55
Catchweight (148 lb)	Noad Lahat	def.	Lloyd Carter	Submission (rear-naked choke)	2	3:50
Lightweight	Steve Kozola	def.	Jake Roberts	TKO (punches)	1	0:28
Preliminary card (Spike.com)
Welterweight	Joaquin Buckley	def.	Justin Patterson	Decision (unanimous) (30–27, 29–28, 29–28)	3	5:00
Catchweight (150 lb)	Tim Cho	def.	Joshua Hardwick	TKO (punches)	3	2:43
Bantamweight	Manny Vazquez	def.	Nate Williams	Decision (unanimous) (30–27, 29–27, 29–28)	3	5:00
Catchweight (208 lb)	James Bochnovic	def.	Matt Paul	Submission (rear-naked choke)	1	4:30
Lightweight	Damian Norris	def.	Tom Shoaff	Decision (unanimous) (30–27, 30–27, 30–27)	3	5:00
Lightweight	Mike DeLaVega	def.	Brian Akins	Decision (split) (29–28, 28–29, 29–28)	3	5:00
Postliminary card (Dark Bouts)
Welterweight	Josh Streacker	def.	Tom Holder	Decision (split)	3	5:00
Catchweight (137 lb)	Cory Galloway	def.	David Garcia	Submission (guillotine choke)	1	1:04
Catchweight (157 lb)	Asef Askar	def.	James Esposito	Submission (rear-naked choke)	1	3:06
Catchweight (138 lb)	Brandon Shelhart	def.	Max Fuentes	Submission (rear-naked choke)	2	2:21

== Bellator 176 ==
Bellator 176: Carvalho vs. Manhoef 2
- Date: April 8, 2017
- Venue: Pala Alpitour
- City: Torino, Italy
- Attendance: 9,216
- Total gate: 685,440€ (ITL) $806,400 (USD)

Bellator 176: Carvalho vs. Manhoef 2 took place on April 8, 2017, at the Pala Alpitour in Torino, Italy. The event aired on Spike TV.

Background

A Middleweight world title fight rematch pitting Rafael Carvalho against Melvin Manhoef served as the main event of Bellator 176.

The event was announced by the company in February 2017. It was the second time Bellator MMA held an event at the Pala Alpitour in Torino, Italy. Like the previous card, this event featured both MMA and kickboxing bouts.

Results

Fight card
Weight class				Method	Round	Time	Notes
Middleweight	Rafael Carvalho (c)	def.	Melvin Manhoef	KO (head kick)	4	3:15	(Note: For the Bellator Middleweight Championship.)
Women's Catchweight (132 lb)	Anastasia Yankova	def.	Elina Kallionidou	Decision (unanimous) (29–28, 30–27, 30–27)	3	5:00
Lightweight	Valeriu Mircea	def.	Djamil Chan	Decision (majority) (28–28, 29–28, 29–28)	3	5:00
Lightweight	Mihail Nica	def.	Samba Coulibaly	Submission (anaconda choke)	1	0:36
Bellator Kickboxing 5 fight card
Lightweight (Kickboxing)	Giorgio Petrosyan	def.	Amansio Paraschiv	Decision (unanimous) (29–27, 30–26, 30–26)	3	3:00
Women's Flyweight (Kickboxing)	Denise Kielholtz (c)	def.	Martine Michieletto	Decision (unanimous) (50–45, 49–46, 49–46)	5	3:00	(Note: For the Bellator Kickboxing Women's Flyweight Championship.)
Middleweight (Kickboxing)	John Wayne Parr	def.	Nando Calzetta	KO (head kick)	2	2:59
Lightweight (Kickboxing)	Mustapha Haida	def.	Enriko Kehl	Decision (split) (30–27, 28–29, 29–28)	3	3:00
Featherweight (Kickboxing)	Gaston Bolanos	def.	Luca D'Isanto	Decision (unanimous) (30–27, 30–27, 30–27)	3	3:00

== Bellator 177 ==
Bellator 177: Dantas vs. Higo
- Date: April 14, 2017
- Venue: Budapest Sports Arena
- City: Budapest, Hungary
- Attendance: 11,439
- Total gate: $986,614

Bellator 177: Dantas vs. Higo took place on April 14, 2017, at Budapest Sports Arena in Budapest, Hungary . The event aired on Spike TV.

Background

This event marked Bellator's second event in Hungary. The event featured both MMA and kickboxing bouts.

The main event was originally scheduled to feature Eduardo Dantas against Darrion Caldwell, but Caldwell withdrew due to injury. Leandro Higo stepped in as a replacement. Due to the short notice, the fight was changed from a Bantamweight title bout to a non-title contest at a catchweight of 139 pounds.

Bellator Kickboxing 6 was headlined by a Welterweight world title rematch featuring Zoltán Laszák against Karim Ghajji. Additionally, two-time Glory Featherweight Champion Gabriel Varga made his Bellator Kickboxing debut.

Results

Fight card
Weight class				Method	Round	Time	Notes
Catchweight (139 lb)	Eduardo Dantas	def.	Leandro Higo	Decision (split) (30–27, 28–29, 30–27)	3	5:00
Featherweight	Daniel Weichel	def.	John Teixeira	Decision (split) (29–28, 28–29, 29–28)	3	5:00
Women's Flyweight	Lena Ovchynnikova	def.	Helen Harper	TKO (referee stoppage)	2	5:00
Catchweight (147 lb)	Ádám Borics	def.	Anthony Taylor	Submission (rear-naked choke)	1	4:12
Preliminary card (Spike.com)
Featherweight	Brian Moore	def.	Michal Horejsi	TKO (strikes)	2	3:57
Lightweight	Mate Kertesz	def.	Patrik Szombat	TKO (punches)	2	4:37
Bellator Kickboxing 6 fight card
Welterweight (Kickboxing)	Karim Ghajji	def.	Zoltán Laszák (c)	Decision (split) (46–49, 50–45, 48–47)	5	3:00	(Note: For the Bellator Kickboxing Welterweight Championship.)
Middleweight (Kickboxing)	Joe Schilling	def.	Alexandru Negrea	Decision (unanimous) (29–28, 29–28, 29–28)	3	3:00
Welterweight (Kickboxing)	Raymond Daniels	def.	Győrfi Csaba	KO (spinning back kick)	3	0:37
Featherweight (Kickboxing)	Jorina Baars	def.	Irene Martins	Decision (unanimous) (30–25, 30–25, 30–25)	3	3:00
Featherweight (Kickboxing)	Gábor Görbics	def.	Gabriel Varga	Decision (split) (29–28, 28–30, 29–28)	3	3:00

== Bellator 178 ==
Bellator 178: Straus vs. Pitbull 4
- Date: April 21, 2017
- Venue: Mohegan Sun Arena
- City: Uncasville, Connecticut
- Attendance: 9,010
- Total gate: $721,633

Bellator 178: Straus vs. Pitbull 4 took place on April 21, 2017, at Mohegan Sun Arena in Uncasville, Connecticut . The event aired live on Spike TV.

Background

A Bellator Featherweight Championship tetralogy bout between current champion Daniel Straus and former champion Patrício Pitbull took place at the event. The pairing first met in a non-title bout at Bellator 45 on May 11, 2011, where Pitbull won by unanimous decision. Their second meeting took place at Bellator 132 on January 16, 2015, where Pitbull defended the title by submission in the fourth round. Their third meeting took place at Bellator 145 on November 6, 2015, where Straus captured the title by unanimous decision.

A middleweight bout between Ed Ruth and Aaron Goodwine was originally scheduled for this card, but failed to materialize. Ruth instead faced David Mundell.

Results

Fight card
Weight class				Method	Round	Time	Notes
Featherweight	Patrício Pitbull	def.	Daniel Straus (c)	Submission (guillotine choke)	2	0:37	(Note: For the Bellator Featherweight Championship.)
Women's Flyweight	Ilima-Lei Macfarlane	def.	Jessica Middleton	Submission (armbar)	1	2:15
Catchweight (165 lb)	Saad Awad	def.	Ryan Quinn	Decision (unanimous) (30–27, 30–27, 30–27)	3	5:00
Featherweight	A.J. McKee	def.	Dominic Mazzotta	KO (head kick)	1	1:15
Preliminary card (Spike.com)
Flyweight	Remo Cardarelli	def.	John Lopez	Decision (unanimous) (30–27, 29–28, 29–28)	3	5:00
Catchweight (165 lb)	Kastriot Xhema	def.	Nick Alley	KO (punches)	1	3:19
Featherweight	Blair Tugman	def.	Tom English	Submission (rear-naked choke)	3	4:54
Catchweight (195 lb)	Jordan Young	def.	Tim Caron	Submission (D'Arce choke)	1	3:55
Middleweight	Ed Ruth	def.	David Mundell	TKO (knee to the body)	2	3:13
Heavyweight	Tyrell Fortune	def.	Branko Busick	Decision (unanimous) (29–27, 29–27, 29–27)	3	5:00	(Note: Fortune was deducted a point for groin strikes.)
Featherweight	Chris Foster	def.	Shane Manley	Decision (split) (29–28, 29–28, 28–29)	3	5:00
Postliminary card (Dark Bouts)
Catchweight (150 lb)	Don Shainis	def.	Mak Kelleher	Decision (unanimous)	3	5:00
Catchweight (140 lb)	Regivaldo Carvalho	def.	Jay Perrin	Submission (guillotine choke)	3	2:04
Catchweight (165 lb)	Kemran Lachinov	def.	Sam Watford	Decision (split)	3	5:00

== Bellator 179 ==
Bellator 179: MacDonald vs. Daley
- Date: May 19, 2017
- Venue: SSE Arena
- City: London, England
- Attendance: 11,872
- Total gate: 833,999£ (GBP) $1,087,200 (USD)

Bellator 179: MacDonald vs. Daley took place on May 19, 2017, at the SSE Arena in London, England. The event aired on Spike TV.

Background

Bellator returned to London with a welterweight fight pitting Paul Daley against Rory MacDonald serving as the main event of Bellator 179.

Stav Economou was originally scheduled to face Karl Etherington in heavyweight bout. However, the bout was cancelled and Economous faced Dan Konecke.

Neil Grove and Łukasz Parobiec were expected to fight in a Heavyweight bout. However, the fight was cancelled for undisclosed reasons.

Michael Page was scheduled to face Derek Anderson as the co-main event. However, the fight was removed from the card after Page suffered a knee injury and neck injury.

Results

Fight card
Weight class				Method	Round	Time	Notes
Welterweight	Rory MacDonald	def.	Paul Daley	Submission (rear-naked choke)	2	1:45
Light Heavyweight	Linton Vassell	def.	Liam McGeary	Submission (arm-triangle choke)	3	2:28
Heavyweight	Cheick Kongo	def.	Augusto Sakai	Decision (split) (28–29, 29–28, 29–28)	3	5:00
Welterweight	Alex Lohore	def.	Dan Edwards	TKO (punches)	2	0:56
Catchweight (165 lb)	Kevin Ferguson Jr.	def.	DJ Griffin	TKO (punches)	1	3:40
Preliminary card (Spike.com)
Heavyweight	Stav Economou	def.	Dan Konecke	Submission (guillotine choke)	1	1:05
Flyweight	Amir Albazi	def.	Jamie Powell	Decision (unanimous) (30–25, 30–26, 30–26)	3	5:00
Welterweight	Nathan Jones	def.	Umer Kayani	Submission (rear-naked choke)	1	4:35
Middleweight	Fabian Edwards	def.	Rafał Cejrowski	KO (flying knee)	1	3:44
Catchweight (150 lb)	Jeremy Petley	def.	Chase Morton	Decision (unanimous) (29–28, 30–27, 30–26)	3	5:00
Middleweight	Mike Shipman	def.	Marcin Prostko	TKO (knees)	1	2:39
Bantamweight	Salih Kulucan	def.	Diego Barbosa	Submission (heel hook)	1	2:18
Postliminary card (Dark Bouts)
Lightweight	Alfie Davis	def.	Jay Dods	KO (spinning side kick)	1	2:34

== Bellator Monster Energy Fight Series: Charlotte ==
Bellator Monster Energy Fight Series: Charlotte
- Date: May 20, 2017
- Venue: Charlotte Motor Speedway
- City: Charlotte, North Carolina

Bellator Monster Energy Fight Series: Charlotte took place on May 20, 2017, at the Charlotte Motor Speedway in Concord, North Carolina

Background

On May 1, 2017, Bellator announced a special four-fight card that took place at the Monster Energy NASCAR All-Star Race XXXIII. The goal of the event was to scout new talent for a prospective contract. Unlike all previous Bellator events, this event was not televised, as this event took place at a NASCAR race, where Fox Sports, which holds rights to a rival MMA promotion, holds video rights for events at the Charlotte Motor Speedway during the event.

Results

Fight card
Weight class				Method	Round	Time	Notes
Heavyweight	Allen Crowder	def.	Robert Neal	TKO (punches)	1	2:24
Welterweight	Jacob McClintock	def.	Jeremie Holloway	Submission (guillotine choke)	1	1:39
Lightweight	Lashawn Alcocks	def.	Mike Stevens	TKO (punches)	1	2:20
Light Heavyweight	Allen Bose	def.	Chris Crawford	Decision (unanimous) (29–28, 29–28, 29–28)	3	3:00

== Bellator NYC/Bellator 180 ==
Bellator NYC: Sonnen vs. Silva / Bellator 180
- Date: June 24, 2017
- Venue: Madison Square Garden
- City: New York City
- Attendance: 12,133
- Total gate: $1,630,314
- Buyrate: 130,000

Bellator NYC: Sonnen vs. Silva and Bellator 180 took place on June 24, 2017, at Madison Square Garden in New York City. The event aired both Spike TV and on PPV.

Background

A grudge match between rivals Chael Sonnen and Wanderlei Silva served as the main event.

The co-main event was a heavyweight bout between Fedor Emelianenko vs. Matt Mitrione. The pairing were supposed to meet at Bellator 172 but Mitrione had to be hospitalized due to kidney stones.

Debuting former UFC fighter Ryan Bader was initially scheduled to face Muhammed Lawal on this card. However, Lawal pulled out of the fight due to an injury and Bader instead faced Light Heavyweight champion Phil Davis in a rematch. Bader and Davis first met at UFC on Fox: Gustafsson vs. Johnson on January 24, 2015, with Bader winning by split decision.

A fight between Keri Anne Melendez and Sadee Monseratte Williams was scheduled but cancelled after Melendez pulled out due to injury.

The PPV portion of the MSG card was referred to as Bellator NYC. The undercard, airing on Spike, was Bellator 180.

Results

Bellator NYC card (PPV)
Weight class				Method	Round	Time	Notes
Light Heavyweight	Chael Sonnen	def.	Wanderlei Silva	Decision (unanimous) (30–26, 30–27, 30–27)	3	5:00
Welterweight	Neiman Gracie	def.	Dave Marfone	Submission (rear-naked choke)	2	2:27	(Note: Added to the main card during the live broadcast. Originally supposed to take place after the main event due to time constraints.)
Heavyweight	Matt Mitrione	def.	Fedor Emelianenko	TKO (punches)	1	1:14
Lightweight	Brent Primus	def.	Michael Chandler (c)	TKO (doctor stoppage)	1	2:22	(Note: For the Bellator Lightweight Championship.)
Lightweight	Zach Freeman	def.	Aaron Pico	Submission (guillotine choke)	1	0:24
Welterweight	Douglas Lima (c)	def.	Lorenz Larkin	Decision (unanimous) (50–45, 48–47, 48–47)	5	5:00	(Note: For the Bellator Welterweight Championship.)
Bellator 180 card (Spike TV)
Light Heavyweight	Ryan Bader	def.	Phil Davis (c)	Decision (split) (49–46, 47–48, 49–46)	5	5:00	(Note: For the Bellator Light Heavyweight Championship.)
Featherweight	James Gallagher	def.	Chinzo Machida	Submission (rear-naked choke)	1	2:22
Women's Flyweight	Heather Hardy	def.	Alice Yauger	TKO (punches)	3	4:47
Bellator 180 Preliminary Card (Bellator.com)
Welterweight	Ryan Couture	def.	Haim Gozali	Decision (unanimous) (30–26, 30–27, 30–27)	3	5:00
Lightweight	Bradley Desir	def.	Nate Grebb	KO (punches)	1	2:54
Lightweight	Anthony Giacchina	def.	Jerome Mickle	Submission (rear-naked choke)	3	3:40
Catchweight (130 lb)	Matt Rizzo	def.	Sergio da Silva	Submission (arm-triangle choke)	3	3:48
Catchweight (168 lb)	Hugh McKenna	def.	John Salgado	Submission (kimura)	1	4:06

== Bellator 181 ==
Bellator 181: Girtz vs. Campos 3
- Date: July 14, 2017
- Venue: WinStar World Casino
- City: Thackerville, Oklahoma
- Attendance: 1,247
- Total gate: $108,594

Bellator 181: Girtz vs. Campos 3 took place on July 14, 2017, at the WinStar World Casino in Thackerville, Oklahoma. The event aired live in prime time on Spike TV.

Background

The main event featured Brandon Girtz against Derek Campos in a rubber match. Campos won the pair's initial meeting in June 2013 at Bellator 96 by unanimous decision. Girtz avenged the loss in November 2015 at Bellator 146, where he won by knockout in the first round.

Former UFC fighter Valérie Létourneau was expected to make her Bellator debut on this card against Emily Ducote. However, on July 10, Létourneau withdrew from the bout due to injury and was replaced by Jessica Middleton.

Results

Fight card
Weight class				Method	Round	Time	Notes
Catchweight (158 lb)	Derek Campos	def.	Brandon Girtz	TKO (doctor stoppage)	2	5:00
Middleweight	John Salter	def.	Kendall Grove	Submission (rear-naked choke)	1	4:37
Women's Flyweight	Emily Ducote	def.	Jessica Middleton	Decision (unanimous) (29–27, 29–28, 29–28)	3	5:00
Bantamweight	Joe Warren	def.	Steve Garcia	Decision (unanimous) (30–27, 30–27, 30–27)	3	5:00
Preliminary card (Spike.com)
Welterweight	E. J. Brooks	def.	Guilherme Bomba	Decision (unanimous) (29–28, 29–28, 30–27)	3	5:00
Middleweight	Rafael Lovato Jr.	def.	Mike Rhodes	Submission (rear-naked choke)	1	1:59
Heavyweight	Valentin Moldavsky	def.	Carl Seumanutafa	Decision (unanimous) (30–26, 30–26, 30–27)	3	5:00
Welterweight	André Fialho	def.	A.J. Matthews	Decision (split) (28–29, 29–28, 29–28)	3	5:00
Welterweight	Logan Storley	def.	Kemmyelle Haley	TKO (elbows)	1	1:44
Middleweight	Romero Cotton	def.	Aaron Rodriguez	Decision (split) (30–27, 27–30, 29–28)	3	5:00
Women's Flyweight	Katy Collins	def.	Bruna Vargas	Decision (unanimous) (30–27, 30–27, 30–27)	3	5:00
Postliminary card (Dark Bouts)
Welterweight	Jonathan Gary	def.	William Florentino	Decision (unanimous)	3	5:00
Women's Featherweight	Amanda Bell	def.	Brittney Elkin	TKO (punches)	2	4:56
Bantamweight	Jordan Howard	def.	Johnny Marigo	KO (punch)	1	1:26
Featherweight	Justin Lawrence	def.	Treston Thomison	TKO (doctor stoppage)	1	3:34

== Bellator Monster Energy Fight Series: Bristol ==
Bellator: Monster Energy Fight Series: Bristol
- Date: August 19, 2017
- Venue: Bristol Motor Speedway
- City: Bristol, Tennessee

Bellator Monster Energy Fight Series: Bristol was the second installment of the series and took place on August 19, 2017, at the Bristol Motor Speedway, in Bristol, Tennessee. Again, the fights were not televised because of television conflicts with NASCAR's rights holder (NBC, which airs the Professional Fighters League, aired a PFL contest June 30).

Results

Fight card
Weight class				Method	Round	Time	Notes
Welterweight	Brandon Bell	def.	Ben Sergent	Decision (unanimous)	3	5:00
Lightweight	Nick Gehrts	def.	Ken Beverly	Submission (D'Arce choke)	3	2:01
Lightweight	Jonathan Pearce	def.	Damir Ferhatbegovic	Submission (rear-naked choke)	3	0:43
Featherweight	Preston Schick	def.	Ahva Mayi	TKO (punches)	2	0:37	(Note: Amateur bout)

== Bellator 182 ==
Bellator 182: Koreshkov vs. Njokuani
- Date: August 25, 2017
- Venue: Turning Stone Resort & Casino
- City: Verona, New York
- Attendance: 4,390
- Total gate: $521,313

Bellator 182: Koreshkov vs. Njokuani took place on August 25, 2017, at the Turning Stone Resort & Casino in Verona, New York. The event aired live in prime time on Spike TV.

Background

The main event featured former Bellator Welterweight Champion Andrey Koreshkov versus Chidi Njokuani. It was originally scheduled as a welterweight bout, but Njokuani missed weight so the bout was contested at a catchweight of 175 pounds.

The co-main event of Brennan Ward against Fernando Gonzalez was set to be a catchweight bout of 178 pounds. However, Gonzalez weighed in at 180 pounds.

Gabby Holloway was originally scheduled to face Talita Nogueira on this card. However, on August 1, Holloway withdrew from the bout and was replaced by Amanda Bell.

Results

Fight card
Weight class				Method	Round	Time	Notes
Catchweight (175 lb)	Andrey Koreshkov	def.	Chidi Njokuani	TKO (punches and elbows)	1	4:08
Catchweight (180 lb)	Fernando Gonzalez	def.	Brennan Ward	Submission (guillotine choke)	3	1:02
Women's Flyweight	Bruna Ellen	def.	Veta Arteaga	Decision (split) (29–28, 28–29, 29–28)	3	5:00
Featherweight	A.J. McKee	def.	Blair Tugman	Decision (unanimous) (30–27, 30–26, 30–26)	3	5:00
Preliminary card (Spike.com)
Welterweight	Ricky Rainey	def.	Marc Stevens	Decision (unanimous) (29–27, 29–27, 29–27)	3	5:00
Women's Featherweight	Talita Nogueira	def.	Amanda Bell	Submission (rear-naked choke)	1	3:44
Light Heavyweight	Vadim Nemkov	def.	Philipe Lins	KO (punches)	1	3.03
Featherweight	Henry Corrales	def.	Noad Lahat	Decision (unanimous) (30–27, 29–28, 29–28)	3	5:00
Featherweight	Georgi Karakhanyan	def.	Daniel Pineda	TKO (doctor stoppage)	2	4:05
Women's Flyweight	Kate Jackson	def.	Colleen Schneider	TKO (injury)	1	5:00
Middleweight	Chris Honeycutt	def.	Kevin Casey	TKO (punches)	2	2:06
Women's Featherweight	Arlene Blencowe	def.	Sinead Kavanagh	Decision (split) (28–29, 30–27, 29–28)	3	5:00
Catchweight (175 lb)	Joey Davis	def.	Justin Roswell	TKO (punches)	1	1:35
Postliminary card (Dark Bouts)
Catchweight (130 lb)	Josh Ricci	def.	Brandon Warne	Decision (unanimous) (29–27, 29–28, 29–28)	3	5:00
Catchweight (138 lb)	Alex Potts	def.	Brandon Polcare	Submission (kimura)	1	3:10
Welterweight	Tom Regal	def.	Kastriot Xhema	KO (punches)	1	3:21
Catchweight (176.5 lb)	Matt Secor	def.	T.J. Sumler	Submission (keylock)	1	4:00
Women's Flyweight	Kristi Lopez	vs.	Jessica Sotack	Draw (split) (29–28, 28–29, 28–28)	3	5:00

== Bellator 183 ==
Bellator 183: Henderson vs. Pitbull
- Date: September 23, 2017
- Venue: SAP Center
- City: San Jose, California
- Attendance: 5,897
- Total gate: $452,920

Bellator 183: Henderson vs. Pitbull took place on September 23, 2017, at the SAP Center in San Jose, California. The event aired live in prime time on Spike TV.

Background

The main event featured a Lightweight bout between Benson Henderson and Patricky Freire.

Also occurring on the show was Bellator Kickboxing 7 headlined by featherweight title bout between Kevin Ross and Domenico Lomurno.

Results

Fight card
Weight class				Method	Round	Time	Notes
Lightweight	Patricky Freire	def.	Benson Henderson	Decision (split) (28–29, 29–28, 29–28)	3	5:00
Welterweight	Paul Daley	def.	Lorenz Larkin	KO (punches)	2	2:40
Heavyweight	Roy Nelson	def.	Javy Ayala	Decision (unanimous) (30–26, 29–28, 29–28)	3	5:00
Featherweight	Aaron Pico	def.	Justin Linn	KO (punch)	1	3:45
Lightweight	Goiti Yamauchi	def.	Adam Piccolotti	Submission (rear-naked choke)	1	3:19
Preliminary card (Spike.com)
Light Heavyweight	Tony Johnson	def.	Mike Ortega	KO (punch)	2	1:49
Women's Flyweight	Kaytlin Neil	def.	Brooke Mayo	Decision (unanimous) (29–28, 29–28, 29–28)	3	5:00
Featherweight	Brandon Laroco	def.	Gaston Bolanos	Technical Submission (triangle choke)	2	2:16
Women's Flyweight	Jaymee Nievara	def.	Corina Herrera	Decision (unanimous) (30–26, 29–28, 29–27)	3	5:00
Welterweight	Fernando Gonzalez Trevino	def.	Alex Lopez	Decision (split) (29–28, 28–29, 29–28)	3	5:00
Bantamweight	Ricardo Vasquez	def.	Justin Tenedora	Submission (guillotine choke)	1	2:39
Lightweight	J.J. Okanovich	def.	Luis Jauregui	Submission (armbar)	1	0:42
Flyweight	Daniel Gonzalez	def.	Anthony Castrejon	KO (punches)	1	4:03
Bellator Kickboxing 7 fight card
Featherweight (Kickboxing)	Kevin Ross	def.	Domenico Lomurno	Decision (split) (48–47, 47–48, 49–46)	5	3:00	(Note: For the Inaugural Bellator Kickboxing Featherweight Championship.)
Welterweight (Kickboxing)	Raymond Daniels	def.	Karim Ghajji (c)	TKO (doctor stoppage)	1	3:00	(Note: For the Bellator Kickboxing Welterweight Championship.)
Middleweight (Kickboxing)	Joe Schilling	def.	Najib Idali	TKO (doctor stoppage)	2	3:00
Featherweight (Kickboxing)	Jorina Baars	def.	Anke Van Gestel	Decision (unanimous) (29–28, 30–27, 30–27)	3	3:00
Welterweight (Kickboxing)	Malaipet	def.	Jose Palacios	Decision (unanimous) (30–27, 30–27, 30–27)	3	3:00

== Bellator 184 ==
Bellator 184: Dantas vs. Caldwell
- Date: October 6, 2017
- Venue: WinStar World Casino
- City: Thackerville, Oklahoma
- Attendance: 1,247
- Total gate: $108,459

Bellator 184: Dantas vs. Caldwell took place on October 6, 2017, at the WinStar World Casino in Thackerville, Oklahoma. The event aired live in prime time on Spike TV.

Results

Fight card
Weight class				Method	Round	Time	Notes
Bantamweight	Darrion Caldwell	def.	Eduardo Dantas (c)	Decision (unanimous) (48–47, 48–47, 50–45)	5	5:00	(Note: For the Bellator Bantamweight Championship.)
Featherweight	Emmanuel Sanchez	def.	Daniel Straus	Submission (triangle choke)	3	1:56
Featherweight	Pat Curran	def.	John Teixeira	Decision (unanimous) (29–28, 30–27, 30–26)	3	5:00
Bantamweight	Leandro Higo	def.	Joe Taimanglo	Decision (unanimous) (29–28, 30–27, 30–27)	3	5:00
Preliminary card (Spike.com)
Lightweight	Manny Muro	def.	Emmanuel Rivera	Decision (unanimous) (30–27, 30–27, 30–27)	3	5:00
Catchweight (160 lb)	Sean Holden	def.	Shakir McKillip	TKO (punches)	2	4:39
Lightweight	Carrington Banks	def.	Steve Kozola	Decision (unanimous) (30–27, 30–25, 30–25)	3	5:00
Welterweight	Chance Rencountre	def.	Justin Patterson	Submission (D'Arce choke)	1	2:58
Light Heavyweight	Teagan Dooley	def.	DeMarcus Simmons	Submission (americana)	2	2:12
Featherweight	Westin Wilson	def.	L.J. Hermeck	Submission (rear-naked choke)	2	0:55
Catchweight (150 lb)	Kendall Carnahan	def.	Daniel Carey	Decision (unanimous) (29–28, 30–27, 30–27)	3	5:00
Postliminary card (Dark Bouts)
Heavyweight	Ernest James	def.	Ray Jones	TKO (punches)	1	2:53

== Bellator Monster Energy Fight Series: Talladega ==
Bellator: Monster Energy Fight Series: Talladega
- Date: October 13, 2017
- Venue: Talladega Superspeedway
- City: Lincoln, Alabama

Bellator Monster Energy Fight Series: Talladega was the third installment of the series held on October 13, 2017, at the Talladega Superspeedway, in Lincoln, Alabama. Again, the fights were not televised because of television conflicts with NASCAR's rights holder (NBC, which airs the Professional Fighters League, aired a PFL contest June 30 during the Coca-Cola Firecracker 250 at Daytona).

Results

Fight card
Weight class				Method	Round	Time	Notes
Lightweight	Jonathan Pearce	def.	Omar Johnson	TKO (punches)	2	3:57
Heavyweight	Frank Tate	def.	Nkemdirim Oti	Decision (unanimous)	3	5:00
Middleweight	Marcel Stamps	def.	Derek Wilson	TKO (punches)	3	2:50
Heavyweight	Billy Swanson	def.	Christian Echols	Submission (keylock)	2	1:53	(Note: Amateur bout)

== Bellator 185 ==
Bellator 185: Mousasi vs. Shlemenko
- Date: October 20, 2017
- Venue: Mohegan Sun Arena
- City: Uncasville, Connecticut
- Attendance: 8,346
- Total gate: $863,811

Bellator 185: Mousasi vs. Shlemenko took place on October 20, 2017, at Mohegan Sun Arena in Uncasville, Connecticut. The event aired live on Spike TV.

Background

Bellator 185 marked the debut of heralded middleweight fighter Gegard Mousasi. Having competed for the UFC for the last four years, Mousasi opted to sign with Bellator MMA when his contract came up.

Muhammed Lawal was scheduled to face Liam McGeary in a Light Heavyweight bout in the co-main event. However, on October 2, he pulled out of the fight due to an undisclosed injury. He was replaced by Bubba McDaniel. The following week, McGeary pulled out of the fight due to a thumb injury.

Brennan Ward was scheduled to face David Rickels in a welterweight bout on the main card. However, on October 16, Ward was removed from the card due to injury and Rickels was pulled from the card as a result.

Javier Torres was scheduled to face Neiman Gracie on this card, but pulled out due to injury. He was replaced with welterweight Zak Bucia.

Results

Fight card
Weight class				Method	Round	Time	Notes
Middleweight	Gegard Mousasi	def.	Alexander Shlemenko	Decision (unanimous) (29–28, 29–28, 29–28)	3	5:00
Welterweight	Neiman Gracie	def.	Zak Bucia	Submission (neck crank)	2	2:27
Women's Flyweight	Kristina Williams	def.	Heather Hardy	TKO (doctor stoppage)	2	2:00
Lightweight	Ryan Quinn	def.	Marcus Surin	Decision (unanimous) (29–28, 29–28, 29–28)	3	5:00
Women's Flyweight	Lisa Blaine	def.	Ana Julaton	Decision (split) (29–28, 28–29, 29–28)	3	5:00
Preliminary card (Spike.com)
Flyweight	John Lopez	def.	Billy Giovanella	Decision (unanimous) (29–28, 30–27, 30–26)	3	5:00
Lightweight	Kevin Carrier	def.	Jose Antonio Perez	Decision (unanimous) (30–27, 30–27, 30–27)	3	5:00
Catchweight (150 lb)	Vovka Clay	def.	Frank Sforza	Submission (guillotine choke)	2	1:17
Catchweight (150 lb)	Don Shainis	def.	Matthew Denning	TKO (punches)	1	4:50
Catchweight (195 lb)	Jordan Young	def.	Alec Hooben	Submission (triangle choke)	1	2:44
Middleweight	Costello van Steenis	def.	Steve Skrzat	Submission (strikes)	1	2:52
Welterweight	Joaquin Buckley	def.	Vinicius De Jesus	Decision (split) (29–28, 28–29, 29–28)	3	5:00
Featherweight	Pete Rogers Jr.	def.	Timothy Wheeler	Submission (guillotine choke)	1	0:37
Lightweight	Dean Hancock	def.	John Beneduce	TKO (strikes)	1	3:38

== Bellator 186 ==
Bellator 186: Bader vs. Vassell
- Date: November 3, 2017
- Venue: Bryce Jordan Center
- City: University Park, Pennsylvania
- Attendance: 11,677
- Total gate: $1,091,800

Bellator 186: Bader vs. Vassell took place on November 3, 2017, at the Bryce Jordan Center in University Park, Pennsylvania. The event aired live in prime time on Spike TV.

Background

In the Bellator 186 main event Ryan Bader made the first defense of his Light Heavyweight title against Linton Vassell .

The co-main event featured Ilima-Lei Macfarlane against Emily Ducote for the inaugural Bellator Women's Flyweight title.

Results

Fight card
Weight class				Method	Round	Time	Notes
Light Heavyweight	Ryan Bader (c)	def.	Linton Vassell	TKO (punches)	2	3:58	(Note: For the Bellator Light Heavyweight Championship.)
Women's Flyweight	Ilima-Lei Macfarlane	def.	Emily Ducote	Submission (triangle armbar)	5	3:42	(Note: For the inaugural Bellator Women's Flyweight Championship.)
Light Heavyweight	Phil Davis	def.	Leonardo Leite	Decision (unanimous) (30–27, 30–27, 30–27)	3	5:00
Middleweight	Ed Ruth	def.	Chris Dempsey	KO (punch)	2	0:27
Lightweight	Saad Awad	def.	Zach Freeman	TKO (punch)	1	1:07
Preliminary card (Spike.com)
Catchweight (165 lb)	Mike Wilkins	def.	Brett Martinez	Submission (rear-naked choke)	2	1:09
Featherweight	Michael Trizano	def.	Mike Otwell	Submission (Brabo choke)	2	2:07
Bantamweight	Dominick Mazzotta	def.	Matt Lozano	TKO (doctor stoppage)	1	2:37
Welterweight	Logan Storley	def.	Matt Secor	Decision (unanimous) (30–26, 30–27, 30–27)	3	5:00
Featherweight	Tywan Claxton	def.	Jonathan Bowman	KO (flying knee)	1	1:29
Featherweight	Frank Buenafuente	def.	Francis Healy	Decision (unanimous) (30–27, 29–28, 29–28)	3	5:00
Postliminary card (Dark Bouts)
Catchweight (150 lb)	Scott Clymer	def.	Mike Putnam	TKO (punches)	1	3:07
Featherweight	Andrew Salas	def.	Ethan Goss	Decision (split)	3	5:00
Middleweight	Josh Fremd	def.	Ryan Parker	Submission (rear-naked choke)	2	1:25

== Bellator 187 ==
Bellator 187 McKee vs. Moore
- Date: November 10, 2017
- Venue: 3Arena
- City: Dublin, Ireland
- Attendance: 12,667
- Total gate: 789,655€ (IEP) $1,130,530 (USD)

Bellator 187: McKee vs. Moore took place on November 10, 2017, at the 3Arena in Dublin, Ireland. The event aired live in prime time on Spike TV.

Background

James Gallagher was expected to main event Bellator 187 against Jeremiah Labiano; however, on October 11, Gallagher withdrew from the bout due to injury. Labiano was moved to face Noad Lahat at Bellator 188 on November 16.

A featherweight match-up between A.J. McKee and Brian Moore served as the new main event.

The event was a co-promotion between Bellator MMA and BAMMA with BAMMA 32 taking place the same night.

Results

Fight card
Weight class				Method	Round	Time	Notes
Featherweight	A.J. McKee	def.	Brian Moore	Submission (rear-naked choke)	3	0:42
Women's Catchweight (143.8)	Sinead Kavanagh	def.	Maria Casanova	TKO (strikes)	1	0:34
Catchweight (161 lb)	Paul Redmond	def.	Sergio de Jesus Santos	Decision (unanimous) (29–27, 29–27, 29–27)	3	5:00
Catchweight (165 lb)	Kevin Ferguson Jr.	def.	Fred Freeman	Submission (rear-naked choke)	1	1:57
Middleweight	Charlie Ward	def.	John Redmond	KO (punch)	1	4:59

== Bellator 188 ==
Bellator 188: Lahat vs. Labiano
- Date: November 16, 2017
- Venue: Menora Mivtachim Arena
- City: Tel Aviv, Israel
- Attendance: 10,741
- Total gate: ₪3,700,558 (ILS) $1,015,026 (USD)

Bellator 188: Lahat vs. Labiano took place on November 16, 2017, at the Menora Mivtachim Arena in Tel Aviv, Israel. The event aired on Spike TV.

Background

The card was originally headlined by a rematch between champion Patrício Freire and Daniel Weichel for the Bellator Featherweight Championship. The pair previously met in June 2015 at Bellator 138 with Freire winning by knockout. On November 12, it was announced Freire had to withdraw due to a knee injury.

The main event instead featured a match between Noad Lahat and Jeremiah Labiano.

The card also featured Dutch kickboxing standout Denise Kielholtz's second MMA fight.

Results

Fight card
Weight class				Method	Round	Time	Notes
Featherweight	Noad Lahat	def.	Jeremiah Labiano	Decision (unanimous) (29–27, 29–27, 29–27)	3	5:00
Welterweight	Haim Gozali	def.	Arsen Faitovich	Submission (triangle choke)	1	0:43
Middleweight	John Salter	def.	Jason Radcliffe	Submission (rear-naked choke)	1	1:55
Women's Flyweight	Denise Kielholtz	def.	Jessica Middleton	Submission (scarfhold armbar)	1	1:16
Preliminary card (Spike.com)
Bantamweight	Luiz Rocha	def.	Almog Shay	Decision (unanimous) (30–27, 30–27, 29–28)	3	5:00
Welterweight	Shimon Gosh	def.	Francisco Silva	Decision (unanimous) (30–27, 30–27, 29–28)	3	5:00
Women's Featherweight	Olga Rubin	def.	Joana Filipa	TKO (punches)	2	3:46
Lightweight	Oron Kahlon	def.	Julian Maloku	Submission (flying triangle choke)	1	2:08
Middleweight	Alexander Nikulin	def.	Rami Abuhave	KO (punch)	1	1:57
Catchweight (167 lb)	David Abisror	vs.	Alexey Trofimov	No Contest (accidental groin kick)	1	1:20
Featherweight	Natanel Parisi	def.	Or Eliov	Submission (guillotine choke)	1	4:09
Heavyweight	Adam Keresh	def.	Roma Kushnir	TKO (punches)	2	3:06
Lightweight	Moshiko Ben Shimol	def.	Ivan Solomatov	Submission (armbar)	1	4:09
Flyweight	Raz Bring	def.	Nadeem Kablan	Decision (unanimous) (30–27, 30–27, 30–27)	3	5:00
Welterweight	Matan Levi	def.	Erik Sianov	Decision (majority) (28–28, 29–27, 29–27)	3	5:00
Lightweight	Assaf Batan	def.	Mor Attias	Submission (rear-naked choke)	3	4:08

== Bellator: Monster Energy Fight Series: Homestead ==
Bellator: Monster Energy Fight Series: Homestead
- Date: November 19, 2017
- Venue: Homestead-Miami Speedway
- City: Homestead, Florida

Bellator: Monster Energy Fight Series: Homestead was the fourth installment of the series held on November 19, 2017, at the Homestead-Miami Speedway, in Homestead, Florida. Again, the fights were not televised because of television conflicts with NASCAR's rights holder (NBC, which airs the Professional Fighters League, aired a PFL contest June 30 during the Coca-Cola Firecracker 250 at Daytona).

Results

Fight card
Weight class				Method	Round	Time	Notes
Featherweight	Kester Mark	def.	Matt Wagy	Decision (unanimous)	3	5:00
Middleweight	Michael Lombardo	def.	Emmanuel Verdier	Decision (unanimous)	3	5:00
Flyweight	Christian Ynstrala	def.	Christopher Daniel	Submission (armbar)	1	1:17
Featherweight	Landon Quinones	vs.	Rudisel Mora	Draw (unanimous)	3	5:00

== Bellator 189 ==
Bellator 189: Budd vs. Blencowe 2
- Date: December 1, 2017
- Venue: WinStar World Casino
- City: Thackerville, Oklahoma
- Attendance: 1,132
- Total gate: $103,806

Bellator 189: Budd vs. Blencowe 2 took place December 1, 2017 at the WinStar World Casino in Thackerville, Oklahoma. The event aired live in prime time on Spike TV.

Background

In the Bellator 189 main event, women's featherweight champion Julia Budd faced Arlene Blencowe in a rematch. The pair originally fought at Bellator 162 with Budd winning via majority decision.

The co-main event was a middleweight bout between Rafael Lovato Jr. and Chris Honeycutt.

Results

Fight card
Weight class				Method	Round	Time	Notes
Women's Featherweight	Julia Budd (c)	def.	Arlene Blencowe	Decision (split) (49–46, 47–48, 49–46)	5	5:00	(Note: For the Bellator Women's Featherweight Championship.)
Middleweight	Rafael Lovato Jr.	def.	Chris Honeycutt	Decision (unanimous) (29–28, 30–27, 30–27)	3	5:00
Middleweight	Chidi Njokuani	def.	Hisaki Kato	Decision (unanimous) (30–27, 30–27, 30–27)	3	5:00
Catchweight (160 lb)	David Rickels	def.	Adam Piccolotti	Decision (unanimous) (30–27, 30–27, 30–27)	3	5:00
Preliminary card (Spike.com)
Featherweight	Cris Williams	def.	Thomas Lopez	Submission (triangle choke)	1	1:39
Featherweight	Sam Sicilia	def.	Marcos Galvão	Decision (unanimous) (29–28, 29–28, 29–28)	3	5:00
Women's Flyweight	Juliana Velasquez	def.	Na Liang	Submission (armbar)	2	0:32
Bantamweight	Brandon Phillips	def.	Jordan Howard	Decision (unanimous) (30–26, 30–27, 30–27)	3	5:00
Lightweight	Mandel Nallo	def.	Alec Williams	TKO (head kick)	1	0:18
Catchweight (150 lb)	Gaston Bolanos	def.	Rick Gutierrez	KO (spinning elbow)	1	1:13
Postliminary card (Dark Bouts)
Middleweight	Andrew Parker	def.	Frank Patterson	Submission (triangle choke)	1	3:03
Welterweight	Brian Grinnell	def.	Kemmyelle Haley	Submission (triangle choke)	1	0:39
Women's Catchweight (130 lb)	Stephanie Geltmacher	def.	Ky Bennett	Decision (unanimous)	3	5:00

== Bellator 190 ==
Bellator 190: Carvalho vs. Sakara
- Date: December 9, 2017
- Venue: Nelson Mandela Forum
- City: Florence, Italy
- Attendance: 7,310
- Total gate: 582,399€ (ITL) $840,650 (USD)

Bellator 190: Carvalho vs. Sakara took place on December 9, 2017, at the Nelson Mandela Forum in Florence, Italy. The event aired on Spike TV.

Background

A Middleweight world title fight match pitting Rafael Carvalho against Alessio Sakara served as the main event of Bellator 190.

Occurring also on this card is Bellator Kickboxing 8 headlined by Lightweight title bout pitting Giorgio Petrosyan against Youdwicha.

Results

Fight card
Weight class				Method	Round	Time	Notes
Middleweight	Rafael Carvalho (c)	def.	Alessio Sakara	KO (elbow and punches)	1	0:44	(Note: For the Bellator Middleweight Championship.)
Lightweight	Brandon Girtz	def.	Luka Jelcic	KO (punches)	1	1:57
Women's Flyweight	Alejandra Lara	def.	Lena Ovchynnikova	Submission (rear-naked choke)	3	4:09
Lightweight	Carlos Miranda	def.	Mihail Nica	Decision (unanimous) (30–26, 30–27, 30–27)	3	5:00
Preliminary card (Spike.com)
Middleweight	Gregory Babene	def.	Tony Zanko	Submission (armbar)	1	2:04
Bellator Kickboxing 8 fight card
Welterweight (Kickboxing)	Raymond Daniels	def.	Giannis Boukis	Decision (unanimous) (29–28, 30–27, 30–27)	3	3:00
Middleweight (Kickboxing)	Joe Schilling	def.	Filip Verlinden	Decision (unanimous) (30–27, 29–28, 29–28)	3	3:00
Middleweight (Kickboxing)	John Wayne Parr	def.	Piergiulio Paolucci	TKO (referee stoppage)	3	2:32
Featherweight (Kickboxing)	Hamza Imane	def.	Kevin Ross	Decision (split) (28–29, 29–28, 29–28)	3	3:00
Featherweight (Kickboxing)	Gabriel Varga	def.	Roberto Gheorghiță	TKO (referee stoppage)	2	2:49

== Bellator 191 ==
Bellator 191 McDonald vs. Ligier
- Date: December 15, 2017
- Venue: Metro Radio Arena
- City: Newcastle, England
- Attendance: 10,722
- Total gate: 825,411£ (GBP) $1,06,1478 (USD)

Bellator 191: McDonald vs. Ligier took place on December 15, 2017, at the Metro Radio Arena in Newcastle, England. The event aired on tape delay in prime time on Spike TV.

Background

The main event featured the Bellator debut of former World Extreme Cagefighting and Ultimate Fighting Championship bantamweight contender Michael McDonald.

The event was a co-promotion between Bellator MMA and BAMMA 33.

Results

Fight card
Weight class				Method	Round	Time	Notes
Catchweight (138)	Michael McDonald	def.	Peter Ligier	Decision (unanimous) (30–27, 30–27, 30–27)	3	5:00
Women's Flyweight	Valerie Letourneau	def.	Kate Jackson	Decision (unanimous) (30–27, 30–27, 30–27)	3	5:00
Heavyweight	Phil De Fries	def.	James Thompson	Submission (guillotine choke)	1	1:33
Catchweight (146.4)	Jeremy Petley	def.	Lewis Monarch	Decision (split) (27–30, 29–28, 29–28)	3	5:00
Preliminary card (Spike.com)
Welterweight	Mohammad Yahya	def.	Ash Griffiths	TKO (strikes)	1	3:26
