= Talita Nogueira =

Brazilian mixed martial arts (MMA) fighter

- Born: October 13, 1985 (age 41); São Caetano do Sul, Brazil
- Other names: Treta
- Height: 5 ft 10 in (1.78 m)
- Weight: 145 lb (66 kg; 10.4 st)
- Division: Featherweight
- Reach: 70 in (178 cm)
- Fighting out of: São Paulo, Brazil
- Team: Gracie Fusion

Mixed martial arts record
- Total: 10
- Wins: 8
- By knockout: 2
- By submission: 5
- By decision: 1
- Losses: 2
- By knockout: 1
- By decision: 1

Other information
- Mixed martial arts record from Sherdog

Talita Nogueira (born October 13, 1985) is a female Brazilian practitioner and mixed martial artist competing in the Featherweight division. Talita Nogueira is most notable for being the 2011 World Jiu-Jitsu Championship winner and competing in Bellator.

== Mixed martial arts career ==
=== Early career ===
Prior to signing with Bellator, Nogueira fought exclusively in her native Brazil. Until June 2018 she has 7–1 record.

=== Bellator MMA ===
Nogueira signed with Bellator in August 2014.

Nogueira was expected to make her promotional debut at Bellator 133 against Julia Budd on February 13, 2015. However, Nogueira pulled out of the fight due to a knee injury and was replaced by Gabrielle Holloway.

Nogueira was scheduled to face Marloes Coenen at Bellator 163 but the bout was cancelled the day before the event when Talita failed to make weight.

Nogueira faced Amanda Bell at Bellator 182 on August 25, 2017. She won the fight via a rear-naked choke submission in the first round.

In her first title shot, Nogueira faced Julia Budd on July 13, 2018 at Bellator 202. She lost the title fight via TKO in the third round.

Nogueira faced Jessy Miele at Bellator 231 on October 25, 2019. She lost a close bout via split decision.

Talita faced Jessica Borga on April 9, 2021 at Bellator 256. She won via a unanimous decision, even with a point deduction in the second round due to an illegal blow to the back of Borga's head.

== Mixed martial arts record ==
Professional record breakdown
10 matches	8 wins	2 losses
By knockout	2	1
By submission	5	0
By decision	1	1

Res.	Record	Opponent	Method	Event	Date	Round	Time	Location	Notes
Win	8–2	Jessica Borga	Decision (unanimous)	Bellator 256	April 9, 2021	3	5:00	Uncasville, Connecticut, United States	Nogueira was deducted one point in round 2 due to repeated blows to the back of the head.
Loss	7–2	Jessy Miele	Decision (split)	Bellator 231	October 25, 2019	3	5:00	Uncasville, Connecticut, United States	
Loss	7–1	Julia Budd	TKO (punches)	Bellator 202	July 13, 2018	3	4:07	Thackerville, Oklahoma, United States	For the Bellator Women's Featherweight World Championship.
Win	7–0	Amanda Bell	Submission (rear-naked choke)	Bellator 182	August 25, 2017	1	3:44	Verona, New York, United States	
Win	6–0	Michelle Oliveira	Submission (arm-triangle choke)	Taboao Fight Championship	December 7, 2013	1	3:56	São Paulo, Brazil	
Win	5–0	Rosemary Amorim	Submission (armbar)	Talent MMA Circuit 3: Guarulhos 2013	September 28, 2013	2	3:34	São Paulo, Brazil	
Win	4–0	Mahalia Rocha de Morais	Submission (armbar)	Green Fighters Combat	November 20, 2010	2	2:24	São Paulo, Brazil	
Win	3–0	Gringa Gringa	TKO (punches)	Expo Fighting Championship	August 21, 2010	1	3:45	São Paulo, Brazil	
Win	2–0	Gringa Gringa	Submission (armbar)	Reborn Fight 2	July 23, 2010	2	N/A	São Paulo, Brazil	
Win	1–0	Alessandra Thiola	TKO (punches)	Force Fighting Championship 3	November 3, 2009	2	2:50	São Paulo, Brazil	
