= Vanessa Porto =

Brazilian boxer and mixed martial arts (MMA) fighter

- Born: Vanessa Alessandra Teixeira Porto; March 16, 1984 (age 42); Americana, São Paulo, Brazil
- Nationality: Brazilian
- Height: 5 ft 5 in (1.65 m)
- Weight: 125 lb (57 kg; 8.9 st)
- Division: Flyweight (125 lb); Bantamweight (135 lb)
- Style: Boxing, Brazilian jiu-jitsu
- Fighting out of: São Paulo, Brazil
- Team: The MMA University; Drenix Iglesia Team
- Years active: 2005–present

Mixed martial arts record
- Total: 33
- Wins: 23
- By knockout: 4
- By submission: 11
- By decision: 8
- Losses: 10
- By knockout: 2
- By submission: 2
- By decision: 6

Other information
- Mixed martial arts record from Sherdog

Vanessa Alessandra Teixeira Porto (born March 16, 1984) is a retired Brazilian mixed martial artist and amateur boxer who competes in the flyweight division.

== Background ==
Porto grew up in Jaú, São Paulo in a family of soccer players. She had an appreciation for martial arts from a young age and started to practice Brazilian jiu-jitsu in 2004. She is currently married to her trainer Pedro Iglesias.

== Mixed martial arts career ==
=== Early career ===
Porto began her professional MMA career in 2005. She initially fought only for Brazilian promotions such as Storm Samurai and Champions Night and faced opponents including Carina Damm, Cris Cyborg and Brazilian kickboxing champion Juliana Werner Aguiar. She defeated Aguiar on three occasions.

With a record of five wins and two losses, Porto signed with the U.S.-based Fatal Femmes Fighting promotion.

=== Fatal Femmes Fighting and Revolution Fight Club ===
Porto made her FFF debut against Tonya Evinger on July 14, 2007, at Fatal Femmes Fighting 2. She defeated Evinger via submission due to an armbar in the first round.

Porto was expected to face FFF bantamweight champion Roxanne Modafferi on November 3, 2007, at Fatal Femmes Fighting 3. However, Modafferi was removed from the event due to a shoulder injury and was replaced by Hitomi Akano. Porto defeated Akano via split decision after five rounds. Her match for the FFF bantamweight title against Modafferi happened on April 3, 2008, at Fatal Femmes Fighting 4. Porto lost via TKO for the first time in her MMA career.

Porto faced Germaine de Randamie on December 19, 2008, at Revolution Fight Club 2. She won via submission due to an armbar in the first round.

=== Return to Brazilian promotions ===
Between December 2008 and March 2011, Porto amassed five victories and suffered a single loss against Amanda Nunes. On October 28, 2011, Porto defeated Jennifer Maia via technical submission due to an armbar at Kumite MMA Combate.

Porto became the first Pink Fight champion at 132 pounds on March 10, 2012, when she knocked out Luana Teixeira at Pink Fight 2.

In mid-2012, after a long time away from American promotions, Porto signed with Invicta Fighting Championships.

=== Invicta Fighting Championships ===
Porto was expected to make her Invicta FC debut against Kelly Kobold on July 28, 2012, at Invicta FC 2: Baszler vs. McMann. However, Kobold suffered a shoulder injury and Porto instead faced Sarah D'Alelio. Porto lost the fight via submission due to a reverse triangle armbar in the first round.

Porto dropped down to 125 pounds and faced Tara LaRosa on October 6, 2012, at Invicta FC 3: Penne vs. Sugiyama. She won the fight via unanimous decision.

Porto then fought against Barb Honchak on April 5, 2013, at Invicta FC 5: Penne vs. Waterson in a five-round match to determine the first-ever Invicta FC flyweight champion. She lost the fight via unanimous decision.

Porto faced Zoila Frausto Gurgel on December 7, 2013, at Invicta FC 7. She won the fight via unanimous decision.

Porto was expected to face Roxanne Modafferi at Invicta FC 10: Waterson vs. Tiburcio on December 5, 2014. However she was replaced by Andrea Lee due to visa issue.

Porto the fought Roxanne Modafferi at Invicta FC 12: Kankaanpää vs. Souza on Friday, April 24, 2015. She won the fight via unanimous decision.

On March 11, 2016, Porto face Jennifer Maia second time at Invicta FC 16: Hamasaki vs. Brown. She lost the fight via unanimous decision.

At her next fight, she faced Agnieszka Niedźwiedź at Invicta FC 23: Porto vs. Niedźwiedź. She lost the fight after three round with the judges handed down a win to Niedzwiedz via a unanimous decision.

Porta was expected to face Jessica-Rose Clark on December 8, 2018, at Invicta FC 26: Maia vs. Niedwiedz; however, Clark was replaced byd Milana Dudieva.

At the weight-ins, Porta weight 127.6 Ibs, misse weight by 2.6 Ibs of the upper flyweight limit of 125 Ibs, and was fined twenty five percent of her purse. The bout proceeded at catchweight. Porta won the fight via technical knocked out on round three.

One month later, she fought against Mariana Morais on January 13, 2018, at Invicta FC 27: Kaufman vs. Kianzad. She won the fight via a rear-naked choke on round one.

Porto faced Pearl Gonzalez for the vacant Invicta FC Flyweight World Championship at Invicta FC 34 on February 15, 2019. She won the fight via technical decision after an eye poke rendered Porto unable to continue.

Porto was supposed to make her first title defense against Karina Rodríguez at Invicta FC 38: Murato vs. Ducote on November 1, 2019. However, Rodríguez missed weight by a pound and she was unable to compete for the title. She won the bout via unanimous decision.

=== Bellator MMA ===
On September 2, 2020, it was announced that Vanessa was vacating her Invicta title and signing with Bellator MMA.

As the first bout of her four-fight contract, Porto made her promotional debut against Liz Carmouche on April 9, 2021, at Bellator 256. She lost the bout via unanimous decision.

Porto was scheduled to face Ilara Joanne on June 11, 2021, at Bellator 260. However, after weigh-ins, she was deemed unfit to compete by the commission and the bout was scrapped. The bout was rescheduled for July 31, 2021, at Bellator 263. Porto won the close bout via split decision.

Porto faced Veta Arteaga on July 22, 2022, at Bellator 283. She lost the bout via guillotine choke in the second round.

== Championships and accomplishments ==
=== Mixed martial arts ===
- Invicta Fighting Championships
  - Invicta FC Flyweight World Championship (one time)
  - Fight of the Night (One time) vs. Jennifer Maia
- Pink Fight
  - Pink Fight 132-pound champion (one time; only)

=== Amateur boxing ===
- Federação Paulista de Boxe
  - São Paulo State Champion
- Jogos Abertos do Interior
  - 2nd Women's Division: Silver Medal (2011, 64 kg)

== Mixed martial arts record ==
Professional record breakdown
33 matches	23 wins	10 losses
By knockout	4	2
By submission	11	2
By decision	8	6

Res.	Record	Opponent	Method	Event	Date	Round	Time	Location	Notes
Loss	23–10	Veta Arteaga	Submission (guillotine choke)	Bellator 283	July 22, 2022	2	3:47	Tacoma, Washington, United States	
Win	23–9	Ilara Joanne	Decision (split)	Bellator 263	July 31, 2021	3	5:00	Los Angeles, California, United States	
Loss	22–9	Liz Carmouche	Decision (unanimous)	Bellator 256	April 9, 2021	3	5:00	Uncasville, Connecticut, United States	
Win	22–8	Karina Rodríguez	Decision (unanimous)	Invicta FC 38: Murato vs. Ducote	November 1, 2019	3	5:00	Kansas City, Kansas, United States	Catchweight (126 lb) bout; Rodríguez missed weight.
Win	21–8	Pearl Gonzalez	Technical Decision (unanimous)	Invicta FC 34: Porto vs. Gonzalez	February 15, 2019	4	2:34	Kansas City, Missouri, United States	Won the vacant Invicta FC Flyweight Championship. Bout was stopped as Gonzalez inadvertently poked Porto in the eye, rendering her unable to continue.
Win	20–8	Mariana Morais	Submission (rear-naked choke)	Invicta FC 27: Kaufman vs. Kianzad	January 13, 2018	1	4:19	Kansas City, Missouri, United States	
Win	19–8	Milana Dudieva	TKO (punch to the body)	Invicta FC 26: Maia vs. Niedźwiedź	December 8, 2017	3	3:02	Kansas City, Missouri, United States	
Loss	18–8	Agnieszka Niedźwiedź	Decision (unanimous)	Invicta FC 23: Porto vs. Niedźwiedź	May 20, 2017	3	5:00	Kansas City, Missouri, United States	
Loss	18–7	Jennifer Maia	Decision (unanimous)	Invicta FC 16: Hamasaki vs. Brown	March 11, 2016	5	5:00	Las Vegas, Nevada, United States	For the interim Invicta FC Flyweight Championship. Fight Of The Night.
Win	18–6	Roxanne Modafferi	Decision (unanimous)	Invicta FC 12: Kankaanpää vs. Souza	April 24, 2015	3	5:00	Kansas City, Missouri, United States	
Win	17–6	Ana Maria	Decision (unanimous)	Fatality Arena 6	March 30, 2014	3	5:00	Rio de Janeiro, Brazil	
Win	16–6	Zoila Frausto	Decision (unanimous)	Invicta FC 7: Honchak vs. Smith	December 7, 2013	3	5:00	Kansas City, Missouri, United States	
Loss	15–6	Barb Honchak	Decision (unanimous)	Invicta FC 5: Penne vs. Waterson	April 5, 2013	5	5:00	Kansas City, Missouri, United States	For the inaugural Invicta FC Flyweight Championship.
Win	15–5	Tara LaRosa	Decision (unanimous)	Invicta FC 3: Penne vs. Sugiyama	October 6, 2012	3	5:00	Kansas City, Kansas, United States	127 lbs catchweight bout; LaRosa missed weight.
Loss	14–5	Sarah D'Alelio	Submission (reverse triangle armbar)	Invicta FC 2: Baszler vs. McMann	July 28, 2012	1	3:16	Kansas City, Kansas, United States	
Win	14–4	Luana Teixeira	KO (punch)	Pink Fight 2	March 10, 2012	1	0:41	Campos dos Goytacazes, Rio de Janeiro, Brazil	Won inaugural Pink Fight 132 lbs title.
Win	13–4	Jennifer Maia	Technical submission (armbar)	Kumite MMA Combate	October 28, 2011	2	3:55	Porto Alegre, Rio Grande do Sul, Brazil	
Win	12–4	Kalindra Faria	Submission (armbar)	Recife Fighting Championship 4	March 31, 2011	1	3:37	Recife, Pernambuco, Brazil	
Win	11–4	Valdinéia Santos	TKO (punches)	Predador FC 17	December 11, 2010	1	N/A	Jaú, São Paulo, Brazil	
Loss	10–4	Amanda Nunes	TKO (corner stoppage)	Samurai FC 2: Warrior's Return	December 12, 2009	2	5:00	Curitiba, Paraná, Brazil	
Win	10–3	Roberta Torno	Submission (armbar)	Jungle Fight 16	October 17, 2009	1	1:47	Rio de Janeiro, Brazil	
Win	9–3	Mahalia Rocha de Morais	Submission (armbar)	Jungle Fight 15	September 19, 2009	1	4:28	São Paulo, Brazil	
Win	8–3	Germaine de Randamie	Submission (armbar)	Revolution Fight Club 2	December 19, 2008	1	3:36	Miami, Florida, United States	
Loss	7–3	Roxanne Modafferi	TKO (knees)	Fatal Femmes Fighting 4: Call of the Wild	April 3, 2008	3	0:53	Los Angeles, California, United States	For FFF bantamweight title.
Win	7–2	Hitomi Akano	Decision (split)	Fatal Femmes Fighting 3: War of the Roses	November 3, 2007	5	3:00	Ontario, California, United States	
Win	6–2	Tonya Evinger	Submission (armbar)	Fatal Femmes Fighting 2: Girls Night Out	July 14, 2007	1	2:14	Compton, California, United States	
Win	5–2	Juliana Werner Aguiar	Submission (arm-triangle choke)	Super Challenge 1	October 7, 2006	1	1:20	Barueri, São Paulo, Brazil	
Win	4–2	Ana Maria Índia	Submission (rear-naked choke)	Gold Fighters Championship 1	May 20, 2006	2	4:45	Rio de Janeiro, Brazil	
Loss	3–2	Cris Cyborg	Decision (unanimous)	Storm Samurai 9	November 20, 2005	3	5:00	Curitiba, Paraná, Brazil	
Win	3–1	Juliana Werner Aguiar	Technical submission (arm-triangle choke)	Storm Samurai 8	July 2, 2005	1	0:33	Brasília, Brazil	
Win	2–1	Juliana Werner Aguiar	TKO (punches)	Champions Night 12	May 6, 2005	1	4:08	Marília, São Paulo, Brazil	
Win	1–1	Elaine de Lima	Submission (armbar)	Body Fight 2	April 2, 2005	1	1:01	Maringá, Paraná, Brazil	
Loss	0–1	Carina Damm	Decision (unanimous)	Barra Submission Wrestling	February 19, 2005	2	5:00	São João da Barra, Rio de Janeiro, Brazil	

== See also ==
- List of female mixed martial artists

Awards and achievements
Preceded by Jennifer Maia	3rd Invicta FC Flyweight Champion; February 15, 2019 – September 2, 2020	Succeeded by Karina Rodríguez
