= Milana Dudieva =

Russian mixed martial artist

- Born: August 4, 1989 (age 37); Vladikavkaz, North Ossetia, Russia
- Nationality: Russian
- Height: 5 ft 5 in (1.65 m)
- Weight: 135 lb (61 kg; 9 st 9 lb)
- Division: Bantamweight
- Reach: 63.5 in (161 cm)
- Style: Judo
- Fighting out of: Vladikavkaz, North Ossetia-Alania, Russia
- Team: Peresvet FT
- Years active: 2009–present

Mixed martial arts record
- Total: 23
- Wins: 14
- By knockout: 4
- By submission: 6
- By decision: 4
- Losses: 9
- By knockout: 4
- By submission: 2
- By decision: 3

Other information
- Mixed martial arts record from Sherdog

Milana Dudieva (Russian: Милана Дудиева; born August 4, 1989) is a Russian mixed martial artist who formerly competed in the Bantamweight division of the Ultimate Fighting Championship (UFC).

== Mixed martial arts career ==
Dudieva made her debut in 2009 against Julia Berezikova, losing by submission to strikes in the first round. Dudieva won her next eight fights including a win over future UFC Women's Bantamweight Sheila Gaff.

Dudieva would drop next two fights to Jéssica Andrade and Pannie Kianzad.

=== Ultimate Fighting Championship ===
After winning her next two fights Dudieva signed a contract with UFC and was expected to make her debut at UFC 174 against Germaine de Randamie. De Randamie pulled out of the fight due to injury and would be replaced by Valerie Letourneau. Dudieva would also get forced off the card due to injury and was replaced by Elizabeth Phillips.

Dudieva would finally make her debut at UFC Fight Night 48, taking on the girl who replaced her in her last fight, Elizabeth Phillips. She won via split decision.

Dudieva's next fight was against the first woman to win The Ultimate Fighter, Julianna Peña. She lost via TKO in round one.

Upon her Twitter page Dudieva announced that she would take some time off due to her becoming pregnant. Dudieva returned after a year away and lost to Marion Reneau after which she was let go from the UFC.

=== Invicta Fighting Championship ===
In 2017, Dudieva signed with Invicta FC and made her debut in a headline bout against Mara Romero Borella on July 15, 2017, at Invicta FC 24: Dudieva vs. Borella. She lost the fight via split decision.

Dudieva faced Vanessa Porto at Invicta FC 26: Maia vs. Niedwiedz She lost the fight via technical knock out on round three.

Dudieva faced Christina Marks on March 24, 2018, at Invicta FC 28: Morandin vs. Jandiroba. Dudieva won the fight via second-round TKO. In 2019, Dudieva lost a split decision to Karina Rodriguez and then entered the second Phoenix Rising tournament where she lost a decision to Daiana Torquato.

Dudieva was scheduled to face Daiana Torquato at Invicta FC 46 on March 9, 2022. However, after the main event fighter withdrew from the bout four days before the event, Torquato was promoted to the main event title bout. Dudieva was instead scheduled against Denise Gomes. She lost the bout in the third round due to technical knockout by knees and punches.

Dudieva would next face former LFA title challenger Sandra Lavado at Invicta FC 57 on September 20, 2024. She would win the fight via unanimous decision.

== Mixed martial arts record ==
Professional record breakdown
23 matches	14 wins	9 losses
By knockout	4	4
By submission	6	2
By decision	4	3

Res.	Record	Opponent	Method	Event	Date	Round	Time	Location	Notes
Win	14–9	Amanda Torres	Decision (unanimous)	Invicta FC 62	May 16, 2025	3	5:00	Kansas City, Missouri, United States	
Win	13–9	Sandra Lavado	Decision (unanimous)	Invicta FC 57	September 20, 2024	3	5:00	Kansas City, Kansas, United States	
Loss	12–9	Denise Gomes	TKO (knees and punches)	Invicta FC 46	March 9, 2022	3	1:56	Kansas City, Kansas, United States	
Loss	12–8	Karina Rodríguez	Decision (split)	Invicta FC 34	February 15, 2019	3	5:00	Kansas City, Missouri, United States	Fight of the Night.
Win	12–7	Christina Marks	TKO (punches)	Invicta FC 28	March 24, 2018	2	3:57	Salt Lake City, Utah, United States	
Loss	11–7	Vanessa Porto	TKO (punch to the body)	Invicta FC 26	December 8, 2017	3	3:02	Kansas City, Missouri, United States	
Loss	11–6	Mara Romero Borella	Decision (split)	Invicta FC 24	July 15, 2017	3	5:00	Kansas City, Missouri, United States	Return to Flyweight.
Loss	11–5	Marion Reneau	TKO (punches and elbows)	UFC Fight Night: Mousasi vs. Hall 2	November 19, 2016	3	3:03	Belfast, Northern Ireland	
Loss	11–4	Julianna Peña	TKO (punches and elbows)	UFC Fight Night: Mendes vs. Lamas	April 4, 2015	1	3:59	Fairfax, Virginia, United States	
Win	11–3	Elizabeth Phillips	Decision (split)	UFC Fight Night: Bisping vs. Le	August 23, 2014	3	5:00	Macau SAR, China	
Win	10–3	Daria Chibisova	Submission (heel hook)	ProFC 53	April 6, 2014	1	3:34	Rostov-on-Don, Russia	Catchweight (137 lb) bout.
Win	9–3	Anastasia Plisenkova	Submission (armbar)	Oplot Challenge 100	February 15, 2014	1	0:32	Kharkiv, Ukraine	
Loss	8–3	Pannie Kianzad	Decision (unanimous)	ProFC 50	October 16, 2013	3	5:00	Rostov-on-Don, Russia	Catchweight (140 lb) bout.
Loss	8–2	Jéssica Andrade	Submission (guillotine choke)	ProFC 47	April 14, 2013	2	4:34	Rostov-on-Don, Russia	Catchweight (137 lb) bout.
Win	8–1	Danielle West	TKO (punches)	ProFC 40	April 1, 2012	1	0:24	Volgograd, Russia	
Win	7–1	Risalat Mingbatyrova	Submission (armbar)	ProFC 30	August 5, 2011	1	0:41	Rostov-on-Don, Russia	
Win	6–1	Sheila Gaff	Decision (unanimous)	ProFC 22	December 17, 2010	3	5:00	Rostov-on-Don, Russia	
Win	5–1	Ludmila Delicheban	TKO (punches)	ProFC 15: Union Nation Cup 6	April 23, 2010	1	1:16	Moscow, Russia	
Win	4–1	Victoria Syniavina	TKO (doctor stoppage)	ProFC 11: Union Nation Cup 4	December 19, 2009	1	0:27	Rostov-on-Don, Russia	Return to Bantamweight.
Win	3–1	Ekaterina Tarnavskaja	Submission (straight armbar)	ProFC 8: Union Nation Cup 1	August 21, 2009	1	2:23	Rostov-on-Don, Russia	
Win	2–1	Zeinab Gaurgashvily	Submission (bulldog choke)	ProFC 7	July 4, 2009	1	1:45	Rostov-on-Don, Russia	Return to Flyweight.
Win	1–1	Anna Smirnova	Submission (straight armbar)	ProFC 6	May 30, 2009	1	2:49	Rostov-on-Don, Russia	Bantamweight debut.
Loss	0–1	Julia Berezikova	TKO (submission to punches)	FightForce: Day of Anger	February 28, 2009	1	4:40	Saint Petersburg, Russia	Flyweight debut.

== Mixed martial arts exhibition record ==
Res.	Record	Opponent	Method	Event	Date	Round	Time	Location	Notes
Loss	12–8	Daiana Torquato	Decision (split)	Invicta FC Phoenix Series 2	September 6, 2019	1	5:00	Kansas City, Kansas, United States	Strawweight tournament quarter-final bout.

== See also ==
- List of female mixed martial artists
