= Karina Rodríguez (fighter) =

Mexican mixed martial arts (MMA) fighter

Karina Rodrigez
- Born: August 28, 1985 (age 41); Puebla, Mexico
- Nationality: Mexican
- Height: 5 ft 7 in (1.70 m)
- Division: Flyweight (115—125 Ib)
- Fighting out of: Guadalajara, Jalisco, Mexico
- Team: Lobo Gym; Entram Gym
- Years active: 2012 - present

Mixed martial arts record
- Total: 14
- Wins: 10
- By knockout: 3
- By submission: 1
- By decision: 6
- Losses: 4
- By knockout: 1
- By decision: 3

Other information
- Mixed martial arts record from Sherdog

Karina Rodriguez (born August 28, 1985) is a Mexican mixed martial artist currently competing in the flyweight division. She is also the former Invicta FC Flyweight Champion.

== Background ==
Rodriguez, born in Puebla, Mexico, had an active childhood and engaged in various sports such as swimming, basketball, and volleyball. Prior to her transition to mixed martial arts in 2012, she began her training in jiu-jitsu and boxing.

== Mixed martial arts career ==
=== Early career ===
Rodriguez fought under Xtreme Kombat, XFC International and Xtreme Fighters Latino in Mexico and amassed a record of 4-2 prior signed by Invicta Fighting Championships.

=== Invicta Fighting Championships ===
Rodriguez made her Invicta debut on March 28, 2018, against Barbara Acioly on July 15, 2017, at Invicta FC 24: Dudieva vs. Borella. She won the fight via technical knock-out in round one.

Her next fight came on December 8, 2017, facing Christine Ferea at Invicta FC 26: Maia vs. Niedzwiedz. She won the fight via unanimous decision.

On March 28, 2018, Rodriguez faced DeAnna Bennett at Mizuki vs. Jandiroba. At weight-in Bennett weighted 1.9 Ibs over the flyweight limit of 126 Ibs and was fined 25% of her fight purse to Rodriguez. She lost the fight split decision.

Rodríguez faced DeAnna Bennett on March 24, 2018, at Invicta FC 28: Morandin vs. Jandiroba. She lost the fight by split decision.

Rodríguez faced Milana Dudieva on February 15, 2019, at Invicta FC 34: Porto vs. Gonzalez. She won the bout via split decision.

Rodríguez was supposed to face Vanessa Porto at Invicta FC 38: Murato vs. Ducote on November 1, 2019, for the Invicta FC Flyweight World Championship. However, Rodríguez missed weight by a pound and she was unable to compete for the title and was fined 20% of her purse which went to Porto. She lost the bout via unanimous decision.

==== Invicta FC flyweight champion ====
Rodríguez fought for the Invicta FC Flyweight Championship against Daiana Torquato at Invicta 44: Rodríguez vs. Torquato on May 21, 2021. Rodriguez won a unanimous decision to become the organization's first Mexican champion.

Rodríguez was scheduled to make her first title defense against the promotional newcomer Ketlen Souza at Invicta FC 46: Rodríguez vs. Torquato II on March 9, 2022. However, Souza withdrew from the bout four days before the event and was replaced by Daiana Torquato. She won the close bout via split decision.

=== Bellator MMA ===
On July 17, 2022, it was announced that Rodríguez had signed with Bellator.

Due to injuries and surgeries in both knee and wrist and then several setbacks, she never debuted in the promotion and on January 23, 2024, it was announced that she was released from the promotion.

== Championships and accomplishments ==
=== Mixed Martial Arts ===
- Invicta Fighting Championships
  - Invicta FC Flyweight Championship (One time, former)
    - One successful title defence
  - Fight of the Night (One time) vs. Daiana Torquato

== Mixed martial arts record ==
Professional record breakdown
14 matches	10 wins	4 losses
By knockout	3	1
By submission	1	0
By decision	6	3

Res.	Record	Opponent	Method	Event	Date	Round	Time	Location	Notes
Win	10–4	Daiana Torquato	Decision (split)	Invicta FC 46: Rodríguez vs. Torquato II	March 9, 2022	5	5:00	Kansas City, Kansas, United States	Defended the Invicta FC Flyweight Championship.
Win	9–4	Daiana Torquato	Decision (unanimous)	Invicta FC on AXS TV: Rodríguez vs. Torquato	May 21, 2021	5	5:00	Kansas City, Kansas, United States	Won the vacant Invicta FC Flyweight Championship. Fight of the Night.
Loss	8–4	Vanessa Porto	Decision (unanimous)	Invicta FC 38: Murato vs. Ducote	November 1, 2019	3	5:00	Kansas City, Kansas, United States	Catchweight (126 lb) bout; Rodríguez missed weight.
Win	8–3	DeAnna Bennett	Decision (unanimous)	Invicta FC 35: Bennett vs. Rodriguez II	June 7, 2019	3	5:00	Kansas City, Kansas, United States	Invicta FC Flyweight Tournament Final
Win	7–3	Milana Dudieva	Decision (split)	Invicta FC 34: Porto vs. Gonzalez	February 15, 2019	3	5:00	Kansas City, Missouri, United States	Fight of the Night.
Loss	6–3	DeAnna Bennett	Decision (split)	Invicta FC 28: Mizuki vs. Jandiroba	March 24, 2018	3	5:00	Salt Lake City, Utah, United States	
Win	6–2	Christine Ferea	Decision (unanimous)	Invicta FC 26: Maia vs. Niedzwiedz	December 8, 2017	3	5:00	Kansas City, Missouri, United States	
Win	5–2	Barbara Acioly	TKO (head kick and punches)	Invicta FC 24: Dudieva vs. Borella	July 15, 2017	1	2:14	Kansas City, Missouri, United States	
Win	4–2	Jaclyn Sanchez	Submission (punches)	Xtreme Fighters Latino	June 17, 2017	2	4:46	Mexico City, Mexico	
Loss	3–2	Poliana Botelho	KO (spinning back kick to the body)	XFC International 6	September 27, 2014	3	2:15	São Paulo, Brazil	
Win	3–1	Vydalia Ramos	TKO (punches)	Xtreme Kombat 23	August 31, 2014	1	1:17	Naucalpan, Mexico	
Loss	2–1	Alexa Grasso	Decision (unanimous)	Xtreme Kombat 20	August 31, 2013	3	3:00	Cuautitlán Izcalli, Mexico	
Win	2–0	Annely Jimenez Garcia	Decision (unanimous)	Xtreme Kombat 20	August 31, 2013	3	3:00	Cuautitlán Izcalli, Mexico	
Win	1–0	Gabriela Garcia	TKO (punches)	Xtreme Kombat 14	June 23, 2012	1	1:58	Mexico City, Mexico	

== See also ==
- List of current Bellator MMA fighters

Awards and achievements
Preceded by Vanessa Porto	4th Invicta FC Flyweight Champion; May 21, 2021 – present	Succeeded by Incumbent
