= UFC 233 =

UFC mixed martial arts event in 2019

- The poster for UFC 233
- Promotion: Ultimate Fighting Championship
- Date: January 26, 2019 (cancelled)
- Venue: Honda Center
- City: Anaheim, California

Event chronology
UFC Fight Night: Cejudo vs. Dillashaw	UFC 233	UFC Fight Night: Assunção vs. Moraes 2

UFC 233 was a planned mixed martial arts event that was rescheduled to be held by the Ultimate Fighting Championship on January 26, 2019, at the Honda Center in Anaheim, California. The promotion initially announced on December 12, 2018 that the event had been "postponed" and would be rescheduled for a later date. However, the event was ultimately cancelled.

== Background ==
Initially, the promotion was planning a UFC Flyweight Championship bout between 2008 Olympic gold medalist in freestyle wrestling Henry Cejudo and two-time UFC Bantamweight Champion T.J. Dillashaw to headline this event. If successful, Dillashaw would have become the fourth fighter to be champion in two divisions simultaneously (after Conor McGregor at UFC 205, Daniel Cormier at UFC 226 and Amanda Nunes at UFC 232). According to sources, the promotion was expected to dissolve the flyweight division at some point within 2019. However, on December 5, the pairing was moved and took place a week earlier at UFC Fight Night 143, headlining the promotion's inaugural event on ESPN+. In turn, promotion officials tried to arrange a new pairing to anchor the event.

However, the promotion announced plans in mid-December to postpone the event after they determined that they could not arrange a suitable headlining bout. All previously scheduled fights for this event are expected to remain intact and be rescheduled for other events, with the numbered events still maintaining their original titles. This was the fourth time, following UFC 151 in August 2012, UFC 176 in August 2014 and UFC Fight Night: Lamas vs. Penn in October 2016, that the promotion was forced to cancel an event because of a lack of a high profile fight to fill a main event spot.

A lightweight bout between James Vick and Paul Felder was initially scheduled to take place in July 2018 at UFC Fight Night: dos Santos vs. Ivanov. However, Vick was pulled from that bout in late June to act as a replacement against former WSOF Lightweight Champion Justin Gaethje at UFC Fight Night: Gaethje vs. Vick and the bout was scrapped. The pairing was rescheduled for this event.

Islam Makhachev was expected to face Francisco Trinaldo at the event. However, on November 11, 2018 it was reported that Makhachev pulled out from the fight for an undisclosed reason and he was replaced by Alexander Hernandez. In turn, Hernandez was pulled from that fight in favor of a bout with UFC Lightweight Championship challenger Donald Cerrone a week earlier at UFC Fight Night: Cejudo vs. Dillashaw.

A women's flyweight bout between KSW Women's Flyweight Champion and promotional newcomer Ariane Lipski and Joanne Calderwood was initially scheduled for the event. However, it was reported on December 2 that the bout had been rescheduled for the first event on ESPN+ instead.

A bantamweight bout between former WEC and two-time UFC Bantamweight Champion Dominick Cruz and John Lineker was scheduled for the event. However, on December 11, it was announced that Cruz suffered from a shoulder injury and pulled from the event. As a result of the cancellation of UFC 233, Lineker was scheduled to face Cory Sandhagen at UFC Fight Night: Cejudo vs. Dillashaw.

== Cancelled fight card ==
Main Card
Weight class				Method	Round	Time	Notes
Welterweight	Robbie Lawler	vs.	Ben Askren				(Note: Moved to UFC 235.)
Flyweight	Joseph Benavidez	vs.	Deiveson Figueiredo				(Note: Matchup scrapped.)
Women's Strawweight	Cortney Casey	vs.	Cynthia Calvillo				(Note: Moved to UFC on ESPN: Ngannou vs. Velasquez.)
Lightweight	James Vick	vs.	Paul Felder				(Note: Moved to UFC on ESPN: Ngannou vs. Velasquez.)
Women's Strawweight	Aleksandra Albu	vs.	Emily Whitmire				(Note: Moved to UFC on ESPN: Ngannou vs. Velasquez.)
Middleweight	Markus Perez	vs.	Anthony Hernandez				(Note: Moved to UFC Fight Night: Assunção vs. Moraes 2.)
Women's Bantamweight	Marion Reneau	vs.	Yana Kunitskaya				(Note: Moved to UFC Fight Night: Lewis vs. dos Santos.)
Featherweight	Kron Gracie	vs.	Alex Caceres				(Note: Moved to UFC on ESPN: Ngannou vs. Velasquez.)
Bantamweight	Manny Bermudez	vs.	Benito Lopez				(Note: Moved to UFC on ESPN: Ngannou vs. Velasquez.)

== See also ==
- List of UFC events
- 2019 in UFC
- List of current UFC fighters
