= Elizabeth McCarthy =

Elizabeth McCarthy may refer to:

- Liz McCarthy (fighter) (born 1986), American mixed martial artist
- Elizabeth McCarthy, see 1991 New Year Honours
- Betty McCarthy, a character in the film To Find a Man

== See also ==
- Beth McCarthy (disambiguation)
