= Amy Montenegro =

American mixed martial arts fighter

- Born: Amy Cadwell Montenegro; November 1, 1983 (age 42); Issaquah, Washington, United States
- Other names: The Resurrection
- Height: 5 ft 4 in (1.63 m)
- Weight: 115 lb (52 kg; 8.2 st)
- Division: Strawweight
- Team: Gracie Barra NW
- Years active: 2011 - Present

Mixed martial arts record
- Total: 12
- Wins: 8
- By knockout: 1
- By submission: 3
- By decision: 4
- Losses: 4
- By submission: 2
- By decision: 2

Other information
- Mixed martial arts record from Sherdog

Amy Montenegro (born November 1, 1983) is an American mixed martial artist. She competes in the strawweight division for Invicta FC.

== Mixed Martial Arts ==
=== The Ultimate Fighter ===
In April 2016, it was announced that Montenegro would be a contestant on The Ultimate Fighter: Team Joanna vs. Team Cláudia. She was defeated by Helen Harper in the opening qualifying round.

== Mixed martial arts record ==
Professional record breakdown
12 matches	8 wins	4 losses
By knockout	1	0
By submission	3	2
By decision	4	2
No contests	0	

Res.	Record	Opponent	Method	Event	Date	Round	Time	Location	Notes
Loss	8–4	Miranda Granger	Submission (guillotine choke)	Dominate FC 2	September 15, 2018	1	2:45	Tacoma, Washington	For the Dominate FC Strawweight Championship.
Loss	8–3	Virna Jandiroba	Submission (armbar)	Invicta FC 26: Maia vs. Niedzwiedz	December 8, 2017	1	2:50	Kansas City, Missouri	
Win	8–2	Celine Haga	Decision (unanimous)	Invicta FC 21: Anderson vs. Tweet	January 14, 2017	3	5:00	Kansas City, Missouri	
Win	7–2	Glena Avila	Decision (unanimous)	Super Fight League 45	December 12, 2015	5	5:00	Tacoma, Washington	Won the SFL Strawweight Championship
Loss	6–2	Jamie Moyle	Decision (split)	Invicta FC 13: Cyborg vs. Van Duin	July 9, 2015	3	5:00	Las Vegas, Nevada	
Win	6–1	Brianna van Buren	Decision (unanimous)	Invicta FC 11: Cyborg vs. Tweet	February 27, 2015	3	5:00	Los Angeles, California	
Win	5–1	Diana Rael	TKO (punches)	KOTC: Tactical Strike	November 13, 2014	2	2:54	Worley, Idaho	
Win	4–1	Kathina Catron	Submission (rear-naked choke)	Xtreme Fighting Inc. 12	September 6, 2014	3	2:22	Fort Smith, Arkansas	
Loss	3–1	Katie Howard	Decision (split)	CageSport 31	July 19, 2014	3	5:00	Tacoma, Washington	
Win	3–0	Jessica Doerner	Submission (rear-naked choke)	CageSport 28	December 7, 2013	1	4:51	Tacoma, Washington	
Win	2–0	Hadley Griffith	Submission (rear-naked choke)	CageSport 27	October 5, 2013	3	3:21	Tacoma, Washington	
Win	1–0	Cheryl Chan	Decision (split)	Cage Warrior Combat 4	May 11, 2013	3	5:00	Kingston, Washington	
