= Sharon Jacobson =

American MMA fighter (born 1983)

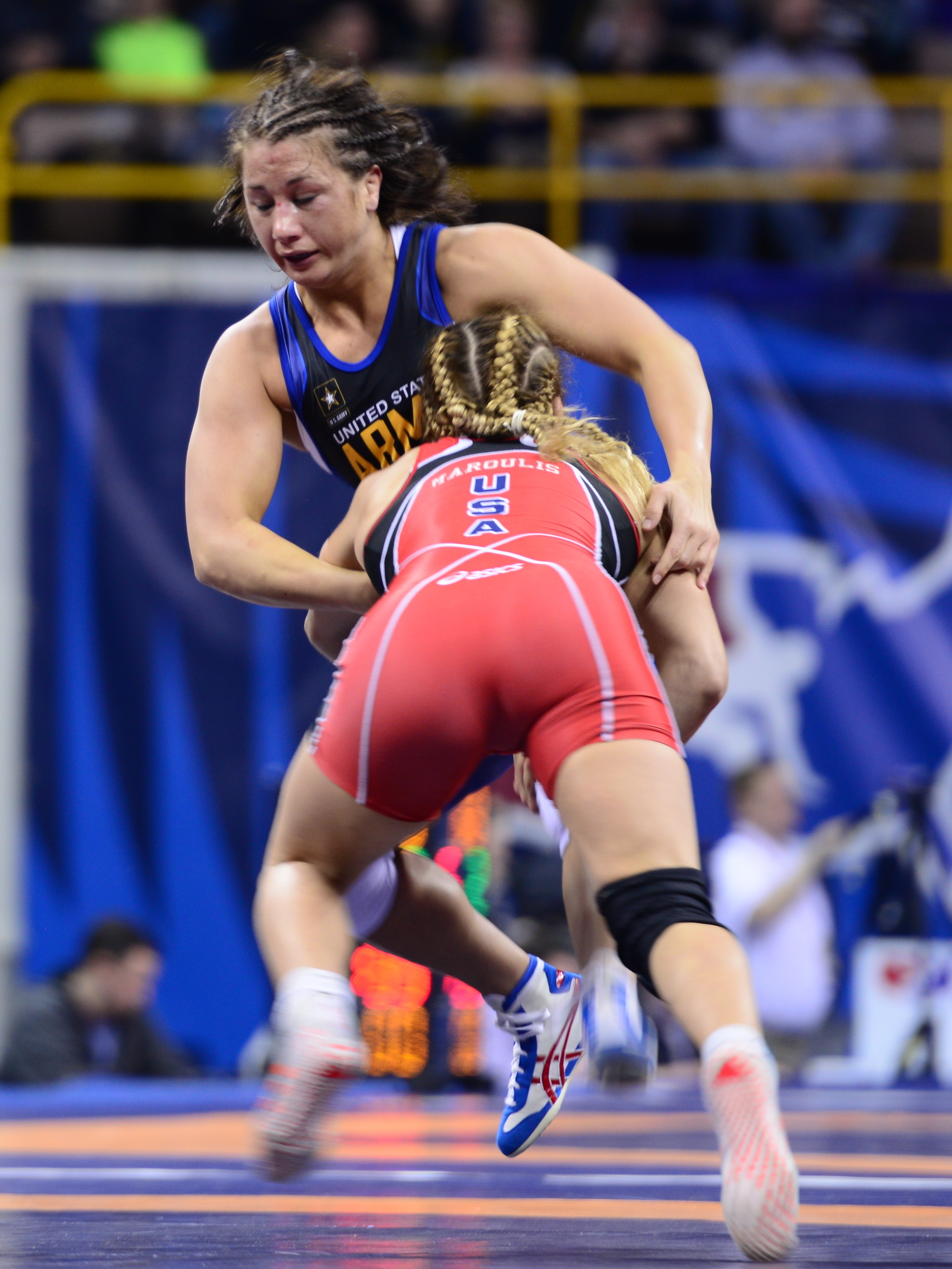
- Jacobson (top) during the 2016 United States Olympic wrestling trials
- Born: August 30, 1983 (age 43); El Cajon, California, United States
- Other names: The Dream Catcher
- Nationality: American
- Height: 5 ft 1 in (1.55 m)
- Weight: 52 kg (115 lb; 8 st 3 lb)
- Division: Strawweight (115 lb)
- Style: Wrestling, BJJ, Boxing
- Fighting out of: Colorado Springs, Colorado
- Team: World Class Athlete Program
- Years active: 2014–present

Mixed martial arts record
- Total: 11
- Wins: 6
- By knockout: 2
- By decision: 4
- Losses: 5
- By submission: 3
- By decision: 2

Other information
- Occupation: U.S. Army sergeant as a Horizontal Construction Engineer
- University: Northern Michigan University, University of Minnesota
- Mixed martial arts record from Sherdog

Sharon Jacobson (born August 3, 1983) is an American mixed martial artist. She competed in strawweight division of the Invicta Fighting Championships (Invicta).

== Background ==
Jacobson started wrestling at the age of sixteen and won two national championships. After graduating from the university, Jacobson joined the United States Army through World Class Athlete Program. She transitioned to mixed martial arts in 2012.

== Mixed martial arts career ==
=== Early career ===
Jacobson amassed a record of 2-1 under Showdown Fights, Xplode Fight Series and No Mercy Extreme Fighting prior signed by Invicta.

=== Invicta Fighting Championships ===
Jacobson made her debut at Invicta on April 24, 2015, at Invicta FC: Kankaanpää vs. Souza against Delaney Owen. She won the fight via unanimous decision.

On her second fight in Invicta, she faced Jamie Moyle on September 12, 2015, at Invicta FC: Evinger vs. Kianzad. She won the fight via unanimous decision.

On August 31, 2017, Jacobson faced Kali Robbins at Invicta FC: Kunitskaya vs. Pa'aluhi. She lost the fight in round one via an armbar.

Jacobson defeated Ashley Nichols on January 13, 2018, at Invicta FC: Kaufman vs. Kianzad.

== Championships and accomplishments ==
=== Wrestling ===
- National women's freestyle champion at 121 pounds in 2008

== Personal life ==
Jacobson serves as a Sergeant in the United States army as a Horizontal Construction Engineer.

== Mixed martial arts record ==
Professional record breakdown
11 matches	6 wins	5 losses
By knockout	2	0
By submission	0	3
By decision	4	2

Res.	Record	Opponent	Method	Event	Date	Round	Time	Location	Notes
Loss	6–5	Kailin Curran	Decision (unanimous)	Invicta Phoenix Series 1	May 3, 2019	1	5:00	Kansas City, Kansas, United States	Invicta FC Strawweight Tournament Semifinal.
Win	6–4	Amber Brown	Decision (unanimous)	Invicta Phoenix Series 1	May 3, 2019	1	5:00	Kansas City, Kansas, United States	Invicta FC Strawweight Tournament Quarterfinal.
Loss	5–4	Kay Hansen	Submission (armbar)	Invicta FC 33: Frey vs. Grusander II	December 15, 2018	3	4:43	Kansas City, Missouri, United States	
Loss	5–3	Emi Fujino	Decision (unanimous)	Pancrase 296	May 20, 2018	3	5:00	Tokyo, Japan	
Win	5–2	Ashley Nichols	Decision (unanimous)	Invicta FC 27: Kaufman vs. Kianzad	January 13, 2018	3	5:00	Kansas City, Missouri, United States	
Loss	4–2	Kali Robbins	Submission (armbar)	Invicta FC 25: Kunitskaya vs. Pa'aluhi	August 31, 2017	1	0:42	Lemoore, California, United States	
Win	4–1	Jamie Moyle	Decision (unanimous)	Invicta FC 14: Evinger vs. Kianzad	September 12, 2015	3	5:00	Kansas City, Missouri, United States	
Win	3–1	Delaney Owen	Decision (unanimous)	Invicta FC 12: Kankaanpää vs. Souza	April 24, 2015	3	5:00	Kansas City, Missouri, United States	
Win	2–1	Ashley Deen	KO (punches)	No Mercy Extreme Fighting: Annihilation 53	January 17, 2015	1	2:25	Colorado Springs, Colorado, United States	
Win	1–1	Katie Anita Runyan	TKO (slam and punches)	Xplode Fight Series: Cerebral	July 19, 2014	1	0:44	Valley Center, California, United States	
Loss	0–1	DeAnna Bennett	Submission (rear-naked choke)	Showdown Fights: Lopez vs. Castillo	January 24, 2014	1	2:12	Orem, Utah, United States	
