= UFC Fight Night: Miocic vs. Hunt =

UFC mixed martial arts event in 2015

- The poster for UFC Fight Night: Miocic vs. Hunt
- Promotion: Ultimate Fighting Championship
- Date: May 10, 2015
- Venue: Adelaide Entertainment Centre
- City: Adelaide, Australia
- Attendance: 7,984
- Total gate: $833,810

Event chronology
UFC 186: Johnson vs. Horiguchi	UFC Fight Night: Miocic vs. Hunt	UFC Fight Night: Edgar vs. Faber

UFC Fight Night: Miocic vs. Hunt (also known as UFC Fight Night 65) was a mixed martial arts event held on May 10, 2015 at the Adelaide Entertainment Centre in Adelaide, Australia.

== Background ==
The event was the first that the promotion has held in South Australia.

The event was headlined by a heavyweight bout between top contenders Stipe Miocic and Mark Hunt. The fight saw Miocic set the record for the number of total strikes landed in a UFC bout, with Miocic landing 361 strikes. Miocic also outlanded Hunt 361–46 in total strikes with the 315 strike differential being the largest margin in UFC history.

Andreas Ståhl was expected to face Kyle Noke at the event. However, on 2 April, it was announced that Ståhl pulled out of the fight due to undisclosed reasons and was replaced by promotional newcomer Jonavin Webb.

Seo Hee Ham was expected to face Bec Rawlings at the event. However, on 10 April, Ham pulled out of the bout due to an undisclosed injury and was replaced by Lisa Ellis.

== Results ==
Main Card (UFC Fight Pass)
Weight class				Method	Round	Time	Notes
Heavyweight	Stipe Miocic	def.	Mark Hunt	TKO (punches)	5	2:47
Middleweight	Robert Whittaker	def.	Brad Tavares	KO (punches)	1	0:44
Light Heavyweight	Sean O'Connell	def.	Anthony Perosh	TKO (punches)	1	0:56
Lightweight	James Vick	def.	Jake Matthews	Submission (guillotine choke)	1	4:53
Preliminary Card (UFC Fight Pass)
Featherweight	Dan Hooker	def.	Hatsu Hioki	KO (head kick and punches)	2	4:13
Welterweight	Kyle Noke	def.	Jonavin Webb	Decision (split) (27–30, 29–28, 29–28)	3	5:00
Middleweight	Sam Alvey	def.	Dan Kelly	TKO (punches)	1	0:49
Women's Strawweight	Bec Rawlings	def.	Lisa Ellis	Submission (rear-naked choke)	1	4:09
Middleweight	Brad Scott	def.	Dylan Andrews	Submission (guillotine choke)	2	4:54
Women's Strawweight	Alex Chambers	def.	Kailin Curran	Submission (armbar)	3	3:15
Welterweight	Brendan O'Reilly	def.	Vik Grujic	Decision (unanimous) (29–28, 29–28, 29–28)	3	5:00
Flyweight	Ben Nguyen	def.	Alptekin Özkılıç	TKO (punches)	1	4:59

== Bonus awards ==
The following fighters were awarded $50,000 bonuses:

- Fight of the Night: None awarded
- Performance of the Night: Robert Whittaker, James Vick, Dan Hooker, and Alex Chambers

== See also ==
- 2015 in UFC
- List of UFC events
- Mixed martial arts in Australia
