= Jinh Yu Frey =

American mixed martial arts (MMA) fighter

- Born: Jinh Hui Yu; May 20, 1985 (age 41); Crossett, Arkansas, U.S.
- Height: 5 ft 2 in (1.57 m)
- Weight: 105 lb (48 kg; 7.5 st)
- Division: Atomweight; Strawweight
- Reach: 65 in (165 cm)
- Fighting out of: Arlington, Texas, U.S.
- Team: Mohler MMA (until 2021); Fortis MMA (2021–present)
- Rank: Brown belt in Brazilian Jiu-Jitsu under Douglas Frey
- Years active: 2013–present

Mixed martial arts record
- Total: 21
- Wins: 11
- By knockout: 1
- By submission: 2
- By decision: 8
- Losses: 10
- By knockout: 3
- By submission: 1
- By decision: 6

Amateur record
- Total: 5
- Wins: 3
- By knockout: 2
- Losses: 2
- By submission: 1

Other information
- University: Amarillo College; Midwestern State University; University of Texas at Arlington
- Mixed martial arts record from Sherdog

Korean name
- Hangul: 유진희
- Hanja: 兪鎭熙
- Revised Romanization: Yu Jinhui
- McCune–Reischauer: Yu Chinhŭi

Jinh Yu Frey (born May 20, 1985) is an American mixed martial artist currently competing in the strawweight division. She is the former Invicta FC Atomweight Champion and has competed in the Ultimate Fighting Championship (UFC).

== Background ==
Frey was born in Arkansas and grew up in Texas. She graduated from Palo Duro High School in three years with a distinguished achievement diploma in the top 2% of her class. She earned an associate degree in nuclear medicine from Amarillo College, followed by a Bachelor of Science in radiologic science from Midwestern State University. She obtained her Master's degree from the University of Texas at Arlington in August 2015.

Her father, who was South Korean, died when she was young. She has one older brother, two younger half-brothers and one younger half-sister. She is married to Douglas Frey.

== Mixed martial arts career ==
Jinh Yu Frey first gained notoriety when she defeated Darla Harris in an MMA fight that went viral online.

=== Invicta FC ===
Frey's early victories in the regional MMA circuit drew the attention of Invicta FC. Jinh Yu Frey's first fight was against Jodie Esquibel, which she lost by decision. In her second fight with the organisation, she defeated fellow atomweight Cassie Robb.

Frey went on to defeat Liz McCarthy and Hérica Tibúrcio via unanimous decisions, earning a shot for the Invicta FC Atomweight Championship. Frey challenged Ayaka Hamasaki for the Atomweight Championship at Invicta FC 19: Maia vs. Modafferi on September 23, 2016. She lost the fight due to a doctor stoppage in the second round.

After the failed title shot, Frey faced Ashley Cummins at Invicta FC 24: Dudieva vs. Borella on July 15, 2017. She won the fight by unanimous decision.

Back in the win column, Frey challenged Seo Hee Ham for the Road FC Women's Atomweight Championship at Road FC 045 XX on December 23, 2017, but lost by knockout in the first round.

==== Second Invicta FC title shot ====
After her former foe Ayaka Hamasaki vacated her title, Frey faced Minna Grusander for the vacant Invicta FC Atomweight Championship at Invicta FC 30: Frey vs. Grusander on July 21, 2018. After being mostly outwrestled, Frey won the title by a unanimous decision, a result that was widely regarded as controversial.

Due to the controversial decision, a rematch was scheduled at Invicta FC 33: Frey vs. Grusander II on December 15, 2018. Frey successfully defended her title with a split decision victory.

After the rematch with Grusander, Frey went on to challenge Ayaka Hamasaki for the Rizin Super Atomweight Championship at Rizin 16: Kobe on June 2, 2019, but lost the fight by unanimous decision.

Frey was expected to defend her title as a headliner of Invicta FC 37 in a rematch against Ashley Cummins, but was forced to withdraw from the bout due to an injury. The bout was rescheduled to Invicta FC 39: Frey vs. Cummins II on February 7, 2020. However, Frey missed the championship weight and vacated her title. The pair fought nevertheless, with Frey winning the bout via unanimous decision.

=== Ultimate Fighting Championship ===
Frey made her UFC debut on June 27, 2020, against Kay Hansen at UFC on ESPN: Poirier vs. Hooker, losing by a submission in round three.

Frey faced Loma Lookboonmee on October 4, 2020 at UFC on ESPN: Holm vs. Aldana but lost by unanimous decision.

Frey faced Gloria de Paula on March 13, 2021, at UFC Fight Night 187, winning by unanimous decision.

Frey was scheduled to face Istela Nunes on July 31, 2021, at UFC on ESPN 28. However, Nunes was forced to withdraw from the bout due to visa issues and was replaced by Ashley Yoder, winning by unanimous decision.

Frey was scheduled to face Hannah Goldy on February 26, 2022, at UFC Fight Night 202. On February 23, Goldy withdrew from the bout due to illness and the bout was cancelled.

Frey faced Vanessa Demopoulos on June 25, 2022, at UFC on ESPN 38, losing by split decision, with 11 of 12 media outlets scoring the fight in favor of Frey.

Frey faced Polyana Viana on November 5, 2022, at UFC Fight Night 214, losing by knockout in the first round.

Frey faced Elise Reed on June 3, 2023, at UFC on ESPN 46, losing the bout by unanimous decision.

Frey faced Victoria Dudakova on October 21, 2023, at UFC 294. Victoria Dudakova At the weigh-ins, Victoria Dudakova weighed in at 116.6 pounds, 0.6 pounds over the strawweight non-title fight limit. Dudakova was fined 20% of her purse, which went to Frey. Frey lost the fight via unanimous decision.

After the loss, it was announced that Frey was no longer on the UFC roster.

== Championships and accomplishments ==
=== Mixed martial arts ===
- Invicta Fighting Championships
  - Invicta FC Atomweight Champion (One time)
    - One successful title defense
- SCS Atomweight Championship
  - SCS Atomweight Champion (One time)
    - One successful title defense

== Mixed martial arts record ==
Professional record breakdown
21 matches	11 wins	10 losses
By knockout	1	3
By submission	2	1
By decision	8	6

Res.	Record	Opponent	Method	Event	Date	Round	Time	Location	Notes
Loss	11–10	Victoria Dudakova	Decision (unanimous)	UFC 294	October 21, 2023	3	5:00	Abu Dhabi, United Arab Emirates	Catchweight (116.6 lb) bout; Dudakova missed weight.
Loss	11–9	Elise Reed	Decision (unanimous)	UFC on ESPN: Kara-France vs. Albazi	June 3, 2023	3	5:00	Las Vegas, Nevada, United States	
Loss	11–8	Polyana Viana	KO (punches)	UFC Fight Night: Rodriguez vs. Lemos	November 5, 2022	1	0:47	Las Vegas, Nevada, United States	
Loss	11–7	Vanessa Demopoulos	Decision (split)	UFC on ESPN: Tsarukyan vs. Gamrot	June 25, 2022	3	5:00	Las Vegas, Nevada, United States	
Win	11–6	Ashley Yoder	Decision (unanimous)	UFC on ESPN: Hall vs. Strickland	July 31, 2021	3	5:00	Las Vegas, Nevada, United States	
Win	10–6	Gloria de Paula	Decision (unanimous)	UFC Fight Night: Edwards vs. Muhammad	March 13, 2021	3	5:00	Las Vegas, Nevada, United States	
Loss	9–6	Loma Lookboonmee	Decision (unanimous)	UFC on ESPN: Holm vs. Aldana	October 4, 2020	3	5:00	Abu Dhabi, United Arab Emirates	
Loss	9–5	Kay Hansen	Submission (armbar)	UFC on ESPN: Poirier vs. Hooker	June 27, 2020	3	2:26	Las Vegas, Nevada, United States	Strawweight debut.
Win	9–4	Ashley Cummins	Decision (unanimous)	Invicta FC 39: Frey vs. Cummins II	February 7, 2020	5	5:00	Kansas City, Kansas, United States	Frey missed weight (105.8 lb) and was stripped of the Invicta FC Atomweight Championship. Only Cummins was eligible to win the title.
Loss	8–4	Ayaka Hamasaki	Decision (unanimous)	Rizin 16	June 2, 2019	3	5:00	Kobe, Japan	For the Rizin Super Atomweight Championship.
Win	8–3	Minna Grusander	Decision (split)	Invicta FC 33: Frey vs. Grusander II	December 15, 2018	5	5:00	Kansas City, Missouri, United States	Defended the Invicta FC Atomweight Championship.
Win	7–3	Minna Grusander	Decision (unanimous)	Invicta FC 30: Frey vs. Grusander	July 21, 2018	5	5:00	Kansas City, Missouri, United States	Won the vacant Invicta FC Atomweight Championship.
Loss	6–3	Seo Hee Ham	TKO (punches)	Road FC 045	December 23, 2017	1	4:40	Seoul, South Korea	For the Road FC Atomweight Championship.
Win	6–2	Ashley Cummins	Decision (unanimous)	Invicta FC 24: Dudieva vs. Borella	July 15, 2017	3	5:00	Kansas City, Missouri, United States	
Loss	5–2	Ayaka Hamasaki	TKO (doctor stoppage)	Invicta FC 19: Maia vs. Modafferi	September 23, 2016	2	4:38	Kansas City, Missouri, United States	For the Invicta FC Atomweight Championship.
Win	5–1	Hérica Tibúrcio	Decision (unanimous)	Invicta FC 16: Hamasaki vs. Brown	March 11, 2016	3	5:00	Las Vegas, Nevada, United States	
Win	4–1	Liz McCarthy	Decision (unanimous)	Invicta FC 14: Evinger vs. Kianzad	September 12, 2015	3	5:00	Kansas City, Missouri, United States	
Win	3–1	Cassie Robb	Submission (rear-naked choke)	Invicta FC 10: Waterson vs. Tiburcio	December 5, 2014	1	2:36	Davenport, Iowa, United States	Catchweight (106.25 lb) bout; Yu Frey missed weight.
Loss	2–1	Jodie Esquibel	Decision (split)	Invicta FC 8: Waterson vs. Tamada	September 6, 2014	3	5:00	Kansas City, Missouri, United States	
Win	2–0	Darla Harris	KO (head kick and punch)	SCS 18: Declaration of Pain	July 27, 2013	1	3:13	Hinton, Oklahoma, United States	Defended the SCS Atomweight Championship.
Win	1–0	Meghan Wright	Submission (rear-naked choke)	SCS 16: Resolution	April 6, 2013	1	2:04	Hinton, Oklahoma, United States	Atomweight debut. Won the SCS Atomweight Championship.

== See also ==
- List of female mixed martial artists

Awards and achievements
Preceded by Ayaka Hamasaki	5th Invicta FC Atomweight Champion; July 21, 2018 – February 6, 2020	Succeeded by Alesha Zappitella
