= Brianna Fortino =

Former American mixed martial artist

- Born: Anicia Brianna Van Buren; August 4, 1993 (age 33); Gilroy, California, United States
- Other names: Tha Bull
- Height: 4 ft 11 in (1.50 m)
- Weight: 140 lb (64 kg; 10 st 0 lb)
- Division: Strawweight
- Reach: 62 in (157 cm)
- Style: Wrestling, BJJ
- Team: unknown (2009–2020); American Kickboxing Academy
- Rank: Brown belt in Brazilian jiu-jitsu
- Years active: 2012–2020

Mixed martial arts record
- Total: 10
- Wins: 7
- By knockout: 2
- By submission: 2
- By decision: 3
- Losses: 3
- By decision: 3

Amateur record
- Total: 5
- Wins: 4
- Losses: 1

Other information
- Mixed martial arts record from Sherdog

Anicia Brianna Fortino (née Van Buren; born August 4, 1993) is a former mixed martial artist (MMA) fighter from the United States, who competed twice in the strawweight division for UFC.

== Background ==
Fortino grew up in Gilroy, California, with her mother. Due to the domestic sexual molestation that she was a victim of in her teens, she moved out of home at the age of 13. She ended up moving in with her uncle – Strikeforce veteran Anthony Figueroa – at whose gym she started training kickboxing, later picking up other disciplines. She attended and graduated from Gilroy High School where she played soccer and wrestled her sophomore year.

== Mixed martial arts career ==
=== Early career ===
Fortino started her professional MMA career in 2012 and fought primarily in California. She amassed a record of 3–1 prior to being signed by Invicta FC.

=== Invicta Fighting Championships ===
Fortino made her Invicta FC debut on February 27, 2015, at Invicta FC 11: Cyborg vs. Tweet against Amy Montenegro. She lost the fight via unanimous decision.

Fortino next faced Jamie Moyle on December 15, 2018, at Invicta FC 33: Frey vs. Grusander II. Moyle missed weight by nine pounds, weighing in at 125.1 lbs and forfeiting 25% of her purse to Van Buren. She won the fight by unanimous decision.

On May 3, 2019, Fortino competed in the first Phoenix Series tournament. A new one-night tournament to determine a new strawweight champion. In the opening round, she faced Manjit Kolekar and won the fight via submission by way of armbar in the first round. She moved on to face Juliana Lima in the semi-finals, winning the fight via unanimous decision. In the finals, Van Buren faced Kailin Curran. She submitted Curran in the second round with a rear naked choke to become the new Invicta FC Strawweight Champion. She would later vacate her title in order to sign with the UFC.

=== Ultimate Fighting Championship ===
On her UFC debut, she faced Lívia Renata Souza, replacing injured Cynthia Calvillo, on July 13, 2019, at UFC Fight Night: de Randamie vs. Ladd. She won by unanimous decision.

Fortino faced Tecia Torres on June 20, 2020, at UFC Fight Night: Blaydes vs. Volkov. She lost the fight via unanimous decision.

Fortino was scheduled to face Jessica Penne on July 16, 2022, at UFC on ABC 3. However, Fortino withdrew in early June due to her pregnancy and was replaced by Emily Ducote.

On October 8, 2024, it was reported that Fortino was removed from the UFC roster.

== Personal life ==
Fortino's moniker "Tha Bull" or "The Bull" was coined by her grandfather when she was young as she used to running around with such attitude that her grandfather called her "El Torito", "The baby bull" in Spanish.

Brianna and her husband Lukas Fortino got married in October 2020, and she officially began using Fortino as her last name also in the UFC. The pair welcomed their first son Jackson in 2021.

== Championships and accomplishments ==
=== Mixed martial arts ===
- Invicta Fighting Championships
  - Invicta FC Strawweight Champion (one time)

== Mixed martial arts record ==
Professional record breakdown
12 matches	9 wins	3 losses
By knockout	2	0
By submission	3	0
By decision	4	3

Res.	Record	Opponent	Method	Event	Date	Round	Time	Location	Notes
Loss	9–3	Tecia Torres	Decision (unanimous)	UFC on ESPN: Blaydes vs. Volkov	June 20, 2020	3	5:00	Las Vegas, Nevada, United States	
Win	9–2	Lívia Renata Souza	Decision (unanimous)	UFC Fight Night: de Randamie vs. Ladd	July 13, 2019	3	5:00	Sacramento, California, United States	
Win	8–2	Kailin Curran	Submission (rear-naked choke)	Invicta Phoenix Series 1	May 3, 2019	2	3:49	Kansas City, Kansas, United States	Invicta FC Strawweight Tournament Final. Won the vacant Invicta FC Strawweight Championship.
Win	7–2	Juliana Lima	Decision (unanimous)	Invicta Phoenix Series 1	May 3, 2019	1	5:00	Kansas City, Kansas, United States	Invicta FC Strawweight Tournament Semifinal.
Win	6–2	Manjit Kolekar	Submission (armbar)	Invicta Phoenix Series 1	May 3, 2019	1	3:20	Kansas City, Kansas, United States	Invicta FC Strawweight Tournament Quarterfinal.
Win	5–2	Jamie Moyle	Decision (unanimous)	Invicta FC 33: Frey vs. Grusander II	December 15, 2018	3	5:00	Kansas City, Missouri, United States	Moyle missed weight (125.1 lb).
Win	4–2	Angela Samaro	Submission (rear-naked choke)	URCC 34	June 15, 2018	1	2:37	Richmond, California, United States	
Loss	3–2	Amy Montenegro	Decision (unanimous)	Invicta FC 11: Cyborg vs. Tweet	February 27, 2015	3	5:00	Los Angeles, California, United States	
Win	3–1	Katie Klimansky-Casimir	TKO (retirement)	Rogue Fights 26	April 12, 2014	1	5:00	Redding, California, United States	
Win	2–1	Patricia Vidonic	Decision (unanimous)	Rogue Fights 25	January 18, 2014	3	5:00	Redding, California, United States	
Loss	1–1	Stephanie Eggink	Decision (unanimous)	XFC 23	April 19, 2013	3	5:00	Louisville, Kentucky, United States	
Win	1–0	Charlene Gellner	KO (punch)	Rogue Fights 20	October 20, 2012	1	2:37	Redding, California, United States	

== See also ==
- List of current Invicta FC fighters
- List of female mixed martial artists

Awards and achievements
Preceded by Virna Jandiroba	6th Invicta FC Strawweight Champion; May 3, 2019 – June 11, 2019	Succeeded by Kanako Murata
