= UFC on ESPN: Ngannou vs. Velasquez =

UFC mixed martial arts event in 2019

- The poster for UFC on ESPN: Ngannou vs. Velasquez
- Promotion: Ultimate Fighting Championship
- Date: February 17, 2019
- Venue: Talking Stick Resort Arena
- City: Phoenix, Arizona
- Attendance: 14,269
- Total gate: $1,400,000

Event chronology
UFC 234: Adesanya vs. Silva	UFC on ESPN: Ngannou vs. Velasquez	UFC Fight Night: Błachowicz vs. Santos

UFC on ESPN: Ngannou vs. Velasquez (also known as UFC on ESPN 1) was a mixed martial arts event produced by the Ultimate Fighting Championship that was held on February 17, 2019 at Talking Stick Resort Arena, now known as Footprint Center in Phoenix, Arizona, United States.

== Background ==
A heavyweight bout between former two-time UFC Heavyweight Champion Cain Velasquez and former title challenger Francis Ngannou served as the event headliner. This is Cain Velasquez's final match before moving to the WWE.

As a result of the cancellation of UFC 233, fights between Cortney Casey and Cynthia Calvillo, James Vick and Paul Felder, Benito Lopez and Manny Bermudez and Aleksandra Albu and Emily Whitmire respectively, were rescheduled for this event.

A women's flyweight bout between former Invicta FC Bantamweight Champion Lauren Murphy and Ashlee Evans-Smith was expected to take place at the event. However, on December 19, Murphy announced she will need more time off to recover from surgery and won't make it to this event. On December 20, it was reported that Andrea Lee would replace Murphy against Evans-Smith.

At the weigh-ins, former UFC Bantamweight Champion Renan Barão, Manny Bermudez and former Invicta FC Atomweight Champion Jessica Penne missed the required weight for their respective fights. Barão weighed at 138 pounds and Bermudez weighed at 140 pounds, 2 pounds and 4 pounds over the bantamweight non-title fight limit of 136 respectively. Meanwhile, Penne weighed in at 118 pounds, 2 pounds over the strawweight non-title fight limit of 116. All three bouts were set to continue at catchweight. Barão and Penne were fined 20% of their purse and Bermudez was fined 30% of his purse which went to their opponents.

In turn, Penne pulled out of her bout against Jodie Esquibel, as she severely sprained her ankle while warming up the morning of the event. The bout was subsequently scrapped.

== Results ==
Main Card (ESPN)
Weight class				Method	Round	Time	Notes
Heavyweight	Francis Ngannou	def.	Cain Velasquez	KO (punches)	1	0:26
Lightweight	Paul Felder	def.	James Vick	Decision (unanimous) (29–28, 30–27, 30–27)	3	5:00
Women's Strawweight	Cynthia Calvillo	def.	Cortney Casey	Decision (unanimous) (29–28, 29–28, 30–27)	3	5:00
Featherweight	Kron Gracie	def.	Alex Caceres	Submission (rear-naked choke)	1	2:06
Welterweight	Vicente Luque	def.	Bryan Barberena	TKO (knees and punches)	3	4:54
Featherweight	Andre Fili	def.	Myles Jury	Decision (unanimous) (29–28, 29–28, 29–28)	3	5:00
Preliminary Card (ESPN)
Bantamweight	Aljamain Sterling	def.	Jimmie Rivera	Decision (unanimous) (30–27, 30–27, 30–27)	3	5:00
Catchweight (140 lb)	Manny Bermudez	def.	Benito Lopez	Submission (guillotine choke)	1	3:09
Women's Flyweight	Andrea Lee	def.	Ashlee Evans-Smith	Decision (unanimous) (30–27, 30–27, 30–27)	3	5:00
Lightweight	Nik Lentz	def.	Scott Holtzman	Decision (unanimous) (29–28, 29–28, 29–28)	3	5:00
Early Preliminary Card (ESPN+)
Catchweight (138 lb)	Luke Sanders	def.	Renan Barão	KO (punches)	2	1:01
Women's Strawweight	Emily Whitmire	def.	Aleksandra Albu	Submission (rear-naked choke)	1	1:01

== Bonus awards ==
The following fighters were awarded $50,000 bonuses:

- Fight of the Night: Vicente Luque vs. Bryan Barberena
- Performance of the Night: Kron Gracie and Luke Sanders

== Reported payout ==
The following is the reported payout to the fighters as reported by the Arizona Department of Gaming. It does not include sponsor money and also does not include the UFC's traditional "fight night" bonuses. The total disclosed payout for the event was $1,871,000.

- Francis Ngannou: $220,000 (includes $110,000 win bonus) def. Cain Velasquez: $450,000
- Paul Felder: $92,000 (includes $46,000 win bonus) def. James Vick: $65,000
- Cynthia Calvillo: $88,000 (includes $44,000 win bonus) def. Cortney Casey: $50,000
- Kron Gracie: $52,000 (includes $27,000 win bonus) def. Alex Caceres: $55,000
- Vicente Luque: $82,000 (includes $41,000 win bonus) def. Bryan Barberena: $35,000
- Andre Fili: $74,000 (includes $37,000 win bonus) def. Myles Jury: $36,000
- Aljamain Sterling: $140,000 (includes $70,000 win bonus) def. Jimmie Rivera: $68,000
- Manny Bermudez: $28,000 (includes $14,000 win bonus) def. Benito Lopez: $12,000
- Andrea Lee: $28,000 (includes $14,000 win bonus) def. Ashlee Evans-Smith: $30,000
- Nik Lentz: $106,000 (includes $53,000 win bonus) def. Scott Holtzman: $33,000
- Luke Sanders: $38,000 (includes $19,000 win bonus) def. Renan Barão: $53,000
- Emily Whitmire: $24,000 (includes $12,000 win bonus) def. Aleksandra Albu: $12,000

== See also ==
- List of UFC events
- 2019 in UFC
- List of current UFC fighters
