= Alex Chambers =

Australian mixed martial artist (born 1978)

- Born: Alexandra Chambers; 28 October 1978 (age 48); New South Wales, Australia
- Other names: Astro Girl
- Nationality: Australian
- Height: 5 ft 3 in (1.60 m)
- Weight: 115 lb (52 kg; 8.2 st)
- Division: Strawweight; Atomweight
- Reach: 63 in (160 cm)
- Style: Karate, BJJ
- Fighting out of: Sydney, Australia
- Team: VT1 Mixed Martial Arts Academy & Gracie Academy Chatswood
- Rank: 3rd dan black belt in Karate; Purple belt in Brazilian Jiu-Jitsu
- Years active: 2010–

Mixed martial arts record
- Total: 10
- Wins: 5
- By knockout: 2
- By submission: 2
- By decision: 1
- Losses: 5
- By submission: 4
- By decision: 1

Other information
- University: University of Sydney
- Mixed martial arts record from Sherdog

Alex Chambers (born 28 October 1978) is an Australian mixed martial artist who competes in the Strawweight division. A professional mixed martial artist since 2010, she has also fought in the Ultimate Fighting Championship and Invicta FC. She was also a contestant on The Ultimate Fighter: A Champion Will Be Crowned.

== Mixed martial arts career ==
=== Early career ===
Chambers started learning karate when she was a child. By the time she was in university, she held a 3rd dan in karate and was competing on an international stage.

Chambers discovered her first (and current) MMA gym through the MMA Underground Forums. Under her gym's tutelage, she was able to become a BJJ national champion before she made her professional MMA debut in May 2010 for the Rize promotion in Australia. It was the first female MMA bout to ever take place in New South Wales state history. She won her debut as well as a subsequent bout which happened around two months later.

After a period of dormancy in 2011, Chambers returned in March 2012 to fight for the Jewels promotion in Japan. She faced Mizuki Inoue and lost the fight via submission. Chambers then returned to Australia to fight in the Brace For War promotion where she was featured as main event on Brace's first ever all female card. She defeated Mika Nagano by TKO on the card.

=== Invicta Fighting championships ===
In 2013, Chambers signed with the Invicta FC promotion. She made her US debut on 5 April 2013 at Invicta FC 5 in an atomweight bout. She defeated Jodie Esquibel by submission early in the first round.

=== Ultimate Fighting Championship ===
==== The Ultimate Fighter ====
On 11 December 2013, it was announced that Chambers was signed by the UFC along with ten other strawweight fighters to compete on The Ultimate Fighter: A Champion Will Be Crowned, which will crown the first ever UFC strawweight champion.

In the first episode, it was revealed that the UFC had seeded the fighters. Chambers was seeded 10th of 16 fighters and was paired with the no. 7 seed, Rose Namajunas. Namajunas was picked fourth by Team Melendez, thereby sending Chambers to Team Pettis. In their fight, she lost the bout via submission in the first round.

==== After TUF ====
In her first fight after The Ultimate Fighter, Chambers faced Aisling Daly at The Ultimate Fighter: A Champion Will Be Crowned Finale on 12 December 2014. She lost the fight via submission in the first round.

Chambers faced Kailin Curran on 10 May 2015 at UFC Fight Night 65. After losing the first two rounds, Chambers came back in the third round to win via submission. The win also earned Chambers her first Performance of the Night bonus award.

Chambers faced Paige VanZant on 5 September 2015 at UFC 191. She lost the fight via submission in the third round.

Chambers faced Nadia Kassem at UFC Fight Night: Werdum vs. Tybura on 19 November 2017 in Sydney, Australia. At the weight-ins, Kassem weighed in at 120 pounds, 4 pounds over the strawweight upper limit of 116 pounds. The bout proceeded at a catchweight and Kassem forfeited 30% of her purse to Chambers. Chambers lost the fight by unanimous decision.

Chambers faced Lívia Renata Souza on 22 September 2018 at UFC Fight Night 137. She lost the fight via a guillotine choke in round one.

In February 2021, it was reported that Chambers and UFC had parted ways.

== Personal life ==
Before becoming a professional MMA fighter, Chambers attended the University of Sydney where she did a double degree in science and mechatronics engineering. Chambers aspired to become an astrophysicist or a robotics engineer before discovering her love for MMA.

Chambers trained at the same gym as fellow UFC fighter and TUF alumni Richard Walsh for seven years.

== Championships and accomplishments ==
- Ultimate Fighting Championship
  - Performance of the Night (One time) vs. Kailin Curran
  - UFC.com Awards
    - 2015: Ranked #6 Submission of the Year vs. Kailin Curran

== Mixed martial arts record ==
Professional record breakdown
10 matches	5 wins	5 losses
By knockout	2	0
By submission	2	4
By decision	1	1

Res.	Record	Opponent	Method	Event	Date	Round	Time	Location	Notes
Loss	5–5	Lívia Renata Souza	Submission (guillotine choke)	UFC Fight Night: Santos vs. Anders	22 September 2018	1	1:21	São Paulo, Brazil	
Loss	5–4	Nadia Kassem	Decision (unanimous)	UFC Fight Night: Werdum vs. Tybura	19 November 2017	3	5:00	Sydney, Australia	Catchweight (120 lbs) bout; Kassem missed weight.
Loss	5–3	Paige VanZant	Submission (armbar)	UFC 191	5 September 2015	3	1:01	Las Vegas, Nevada, United States	
Win	5–2	Kailin Curran	Submission (armbar)	UFC Fight Night: Miocic vs. Hunt	10 May 2015	3	3:15	Adelaide, Australia	Performance of the Night.
Loss	4–2	Aisling Daly	Submission (armbar)	The Ultimate Fighter: A Champion Will Be Crowned Finale	12 December 2014	1	4:53	Las Vegas, Nevada, United States	Return to Strawweight; Daly missed weight (118 lbs).
Win	4–1	Jodie Esquibel	Submission (rear-naked choke)	Invicta FC 5: Penne vs. Waterson	5 April 2013	1	1:35	Kansas City, Missouri, United States	Atomweight debut.
Win	3–1	Mika Nagano	TKO (knee and punches)	BFW 17: Brace Girls	27 October 2012	1	0:42	Southport, Australia	
Loss	2–1	Mizuki Inoue	Submission (armbar)	Jewels 18th Ring	3 March 2012	1	4:32	Tokyo, Japan	
Win	2–0	Claire Fryer	TKO (punches)	Rize 6: Defiance	31 July 2010	1	2:57	Chandler, Australia	
Win	1–0	Jessica Tolhurst	Decision (unanimous)	Rize 5: Revolution	29 May 2010	3	3:00	Chandler, Australia	

=== Mixed martial arts exhibition record ===
Exhibition record breakdown		
1 match	0 wins	1 loss
By submission	0	1

Res.	Record	Opponent	Method	Event	Date	Round	Time	Location	Notes
Loss	0–1	Rose Namajunas	Submission (rear-naked choke)	The Ultimate Fighter: A Champion Will Be Crowned	5 November 2014 (airdate)	1	4:38	Las Vegas, Nevada, United States	TUF 20 Elimination round

== See also ==
- List of female mixed martial artists
