= Sunna Davíðsdóttir =

Icelandic mixed martial artis

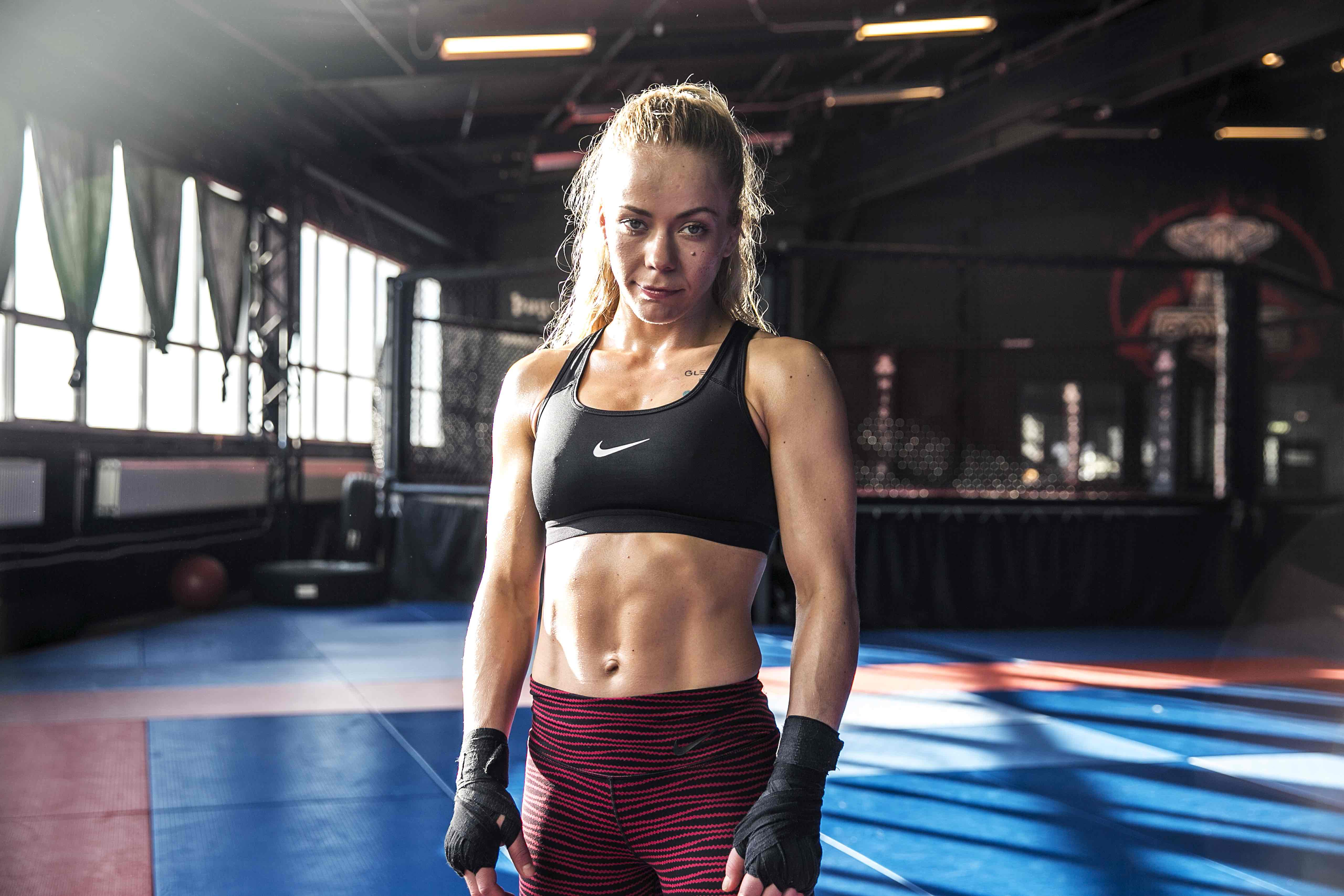
- Born: Sunna Rannveig Davidsdottir; 21 June 1985 (age 41); Reykjavík, Iceland
- Other names: Tsunami
- Height: 5 ft 2 in (1.57 m)
- Weight: 115 lb (52 kg; 8.2 st)
- Division: Strawweight
- Reach: 67 in (170 cm)
- Style: Muay Thai, Kickboxing, BJJ
- Team: Mjölnir MMA

Kickboxing record
- Total: 4
- Wins: 4

Mixed martial arts record
- Total: 4
- Wins: 3
- By decision: 3
- Losses: 1
- By decision: 1

Amateur record
- Total: 5
- Wins: 4
- By knockout: 3
- By decision: 1
- Losses: 1
- By decision: 1

Other information
- Mixed martial arts record from Sherdog

Sunna Rannveig Davíðsdóttir (born 21 June 1985) is an Icelandic mixed martial artist who was signed with the Invicta, where she competes in the strawweight division.

== Mixed martial arts career ==
=== Invicta FC ===
Prior to her professional debut, Davíðsdóttir participated in the 2015 IMMAF European Championships, competing at flyweight. She won the gold medal, winning a split decision against Ilaria Norcia in the quarterfinal and achieving TKO victories over Michaela Dostalova and Anja Saxmark in the semifinals and finals respectively.

Davíðsdóttir was scheduled to make her professional debut on 23 September 2016 against Ashley Greenway at Invicta FC 19: Maia vs. Modafferi. Davíðsdóttir won the fight by unanimous decision.

Davíðsdóttir was scheduled to make her second appearance with Invicta against Mallory Martin at Invicta FC 22: Evinger vs. Kunitskaya II. Davíðsdóttir won the fight by unanimous decision. The fight was later awarded "Fight of the Night" honors.

Davíðsdóttir was scheduled to fight Kelly D'Angelo at Invicta FC 24: Dudieva vs. Borella, in the latter's Invicta debut. Davíðsdóttir won the fight by unanimous decision. The fight once again earned "Fight of the Night" honors.

Davíðsdóttir returned after a two-year layoff to take part in the Invicta FC Phoenix Series 1 tournament. She was scheduled to face Kailin Curran in the tournament semifinals. Davíðsdóttir lost the fight by split decision.

She announced her retirement on 24 February 2024, saying "It has been a wonderful journey, one that has given me a family and life long friends."

== Championships and accomplishments ==
=== Mixed martial arts ===
- IMMAF
  - (gold) 2015 IMMAF European Open Championships (52 kg, Flyweight)
- Invicta Fighting Championships
  - Fight of the Night (Two times) vs. Mallory Martin and Kelly D'Angelo

=== Awards ===
- MMAViking
  - 2016 Female Fighter of the Year
  - 2017 Breakthrough Fighter of the Year

== Mixed martial arts record ==
Professional record breakdown
4 matches	3 wins	1 loss
By decision	3	1

Res.	Record	Opponent	Method	Event	Date	Round	Time	Location	Notes
Loss	3–1	Kailin Curran	Decision (unanimous)	Invicta FC Phoenix Series 1	3 May 2019	1	5:00	Kansas City, Missouri, United States	
Win	3–0	Kelly D'Angelo	Decision (unanimous)	Invicta FC 24: Dudieva vs. Borella	15 July 2017	3	5:00	Kansas City, Missouri, United States	Fight of the Night.
Win	2–0	Mallory Martin	Decision (unanimous)	Invicta FC 22: Evinger vs. Kunitskaya II	25 March 2017	3	5:00	Kansas City, Missouri, United States	Fight of the Night.
Win	1–0	Ashley Greenway	Decision (unanimous)	Invicta FC 19: Maia vs. Modafferi	23 September 2016	3	5:00	Kansas City, Missouri, United States	

=== Amateur mixed martial arts record ===
Amateur record breakdown		
5 matches	4 wins	1 loss
By knockout	3	0
By decision	1	1

Res.	Record	Opponent	Method	Event	Date	Round	Time	Location	Notes
Win	4–1	Anja Saxmark	TKO (punches)	2015 IMMAF European Open Championships	22 November 2015	2	2:32	Wolverhampton, England	Wins the IMMAF European Flyweight Championship
Win	3–1	Michaela Dostalova	TKO (punches)	2015 IMMAF European Open Championships	21 November 2015	1	2:48	Wolverhampton, England	IMMAF European Flyweight Championship Semifinal
Win	2–1	Ilaria Norcia	Decision (split)	2015 IMMAF European Open Championships	20 November 2015	3	3:00	Wolverhampton, England	IMMAF European Flyweight Championship Quarterfinal
Win	1–1	Helen Copua	TKO (knee injury)	Headhunters Fighting Championship	2 May 2015	3	N/A	Larbert, Scotland	
Loss	0–1	Amanda English	Decision (unanimous)	Euro Fight Night	14 September 2013	3	3:00	Dublin, Ireland	

== See also ==
- List of female mixed martial artists
- List of current Invicta FC fighters
