= UFC Fight Night: Cejudo vs. Dillashaw =

UFC mixed martial arts event in 2019

- The poster for UFC Fight Night: Cejudo vs. Dillashaw
- Promotion: Ultimate Fighting Championship
- Date: January 19, 2019
- Venue: Barclays Center
- City: Brooklyn, New York
- Attendance: 12,152
- Total gate: $1,230,000

Event chronology
UFC 232: Jones vs. Gustafsson 2	UFC Fight Night: Cejudo vs. Dillashaw	UFC 233 (cancelled)

UFC Fight Night: Cejudo vs. Dillashaw (also known as UFC Fight Night 143 or UFC on ESPN+ 1) was a mixed martial arts event produced by the Ultimate Fighting Championship that was held on January 19, 2019, at the Barclays Center in Brooklyn, New York.

== Background ==
The event was the first in the promotion's five-year contract with ESPN and the first to be broadcast on the network's fledgling streaming service ESPN+, which was launched less than a month after the initial announcement in April 2018. It generated 525,000 new subscribers to the service on the day of the event alone. It was also the first UFC event to showcase the new UFC legacy belt, which was given out to the winner of Cejudo vs. Dillashaw.

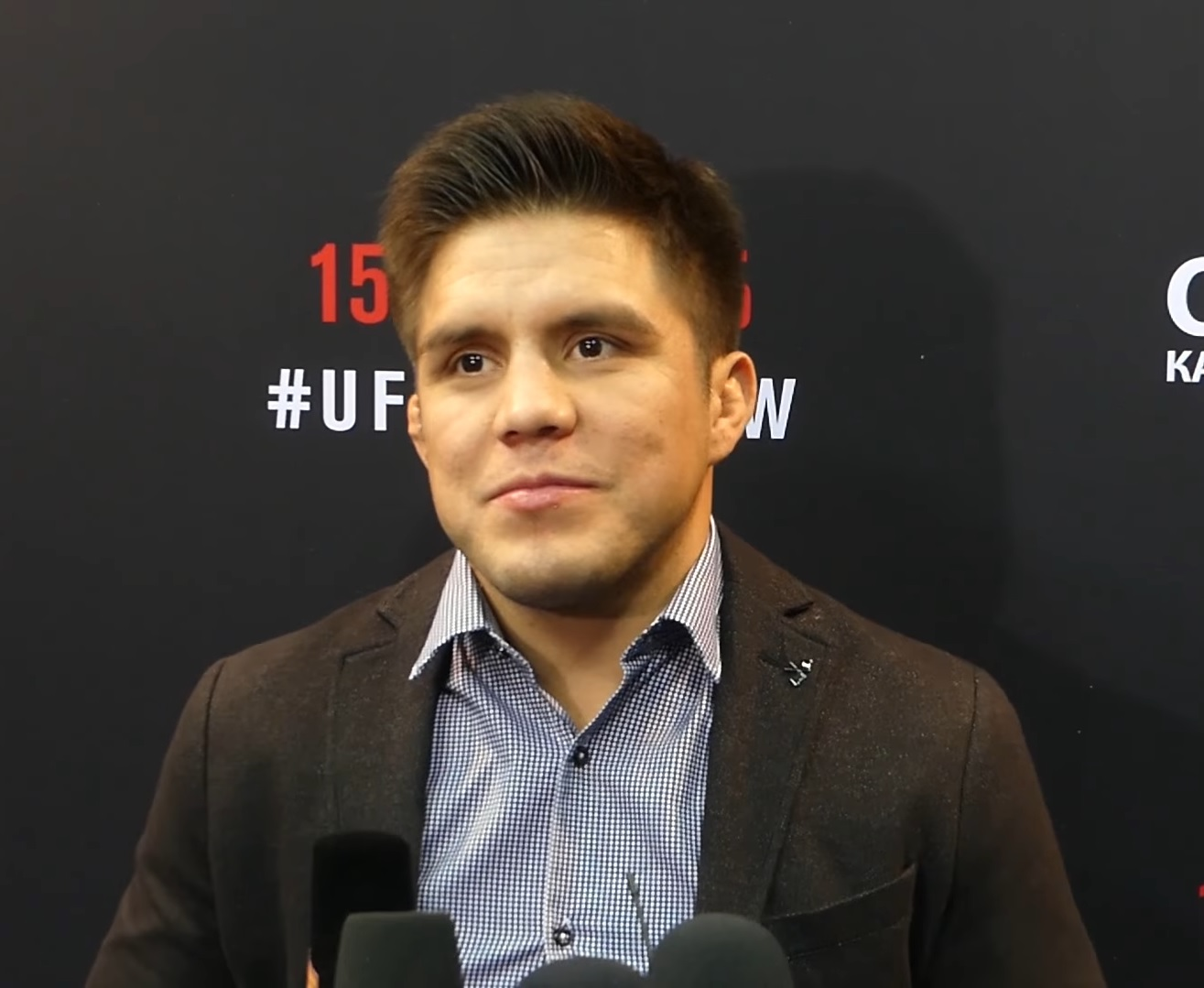
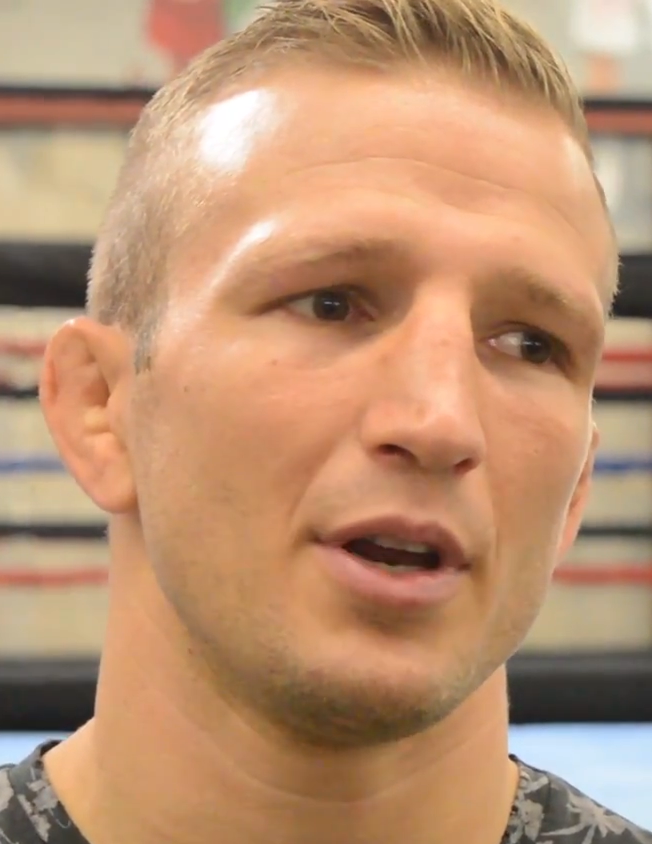
Cejudo (left) is the first Olympic champion to become a UFC champion. Meanwhile, Dillashaw (right) the first challenger in a champion vs. champion bout to drop a division.

A UFC Flyweight Championship bout between 2008 Olympic gold medalist in freestyle wrestling and current champion Henry Cejudo and current two-time UFC Bantamweight Champion T.J. Dillashaw headlined this event. If successful, Dillashaw would become the third man to be champion in two divisions simultaneously and fourth fighter overall (after Conor McGregor at UFC 205, Daniel Cormier at UFC 226 and Amanda Nunes at UFC 232), as well as the seventh person overall to win a title in different divisions. This was the fifth time in UFC history that champions in different divisions fought for the same title, following UFC 94, UFC 205, UFC 226 and UFC 232. The pairing was initially expected to take place at UFC 233 a week later, but was moved on December 5.

A women's flyweight bout between Rachael Ostovich and Paige VanZant was originally canceled on November 20 due to Ostovich being assaulted by her husband, resulting in a broken orbital bone. However, after getting a second opinion from a doctor, though, Ostovich got the green light to stay in the bout. After announcing that former NFL player Greg Hardy would make his UFC debut at this event, the decision to put him on the same card as Ostovich was met with backlash by many people as Hardy was found guilty of assaulting an ex-girlfriend, and sentenced to 18 months probation as well as being suspended for 10 games by the NFL. The charges and suspension were later dropped after the victim failed to appear in court to testify, but Hardy's arrest and trial were the focus of considerable controversy. UFC president Dana White later claimed that Ostovich was "totally cool" with Hardy on the same card as her.

A women's flyweight bout between KSW Women's Flyweight Champion and promotional newcomer Ariane Lipski and Joanne Calderwood was initially scheduled for UFC 233. However, it was reported on December 2 that the bout had been rescheduled for this event instead.

As a result of the cancellation of UFC 233, a flyweight bout between former UFC Flyweight Championship challenger Joseph Benavidez and Deiveson Figueiredo was briefly linked to this event. However the following day, the promotion clarified plans indicating that the pairing was off and that Benavidez would be an alternate for the headliner bout in the event that either Cejudo or Dillashaw would be forced from the main event. Later it was announced that despite still being an alternate, Benavidez would face Dustin Ortiz in a rematch of his unanimous decision win at UFC Fight Night: Edgar vs. Swanson in November 2014.

A bantamweight bout between Thomas Almeida and Cory Sandhagen was briefly linked to the event. However, on December 22, it was announced that Sandhagen would face John Lineker in the event instead. On January 10, Lineker was forced to withdraw from the bout due to a rib injury. He was replaced by promotional newcomer Mario Bautista.

Ion Cuțelaba was expected to face former UFC Light Heavyweight Championship challenger Glover Teixeira at this event. However, on January 10, it was reported that Cuțelaba was forced out of the bout due to injury. He was replaced by Karl Roberson.

Randy Brown was expected to face Chance Rencountre, but pulled out in the week leading up to the event. Dwight Grant was soon announced as his replacement, but it was later reported that he was unable to be cleared to fight due to an "eye issue". Promotional newcomer Kyle Stewart was then announced as Rencountre's new opponent.

== Results ==
Main Card (ESPN+)
Weight class				Method	Round	Time	Notes
Flyweight	Henry Cejudo (c)	def.	T.J. Dillashaw	TKO (punches)	1	0:32	(Note: For the UFC Flyweight Championship. Dillashaw tested positive for erythropoietin (EPO).)
Heavyweight	Allen Crowder	def.	Greg Hardy	DQ (illegal knee)	2	2:28
Lightweight	Gregor Gillespie	def.	Yancy Medeiros	TKO (punches)	2	4:59
Flyweight	Joseph Benavidez	def.	Dustin Ortiz	Decision (unanimous) (29–28, 29–28, 29–28)	3	5:00
Women's Flyweight	Paige VanZant	def.	Rachael Ostovich	Submission (armbar)	2	1:50
Light Heavyweight	Glover Teixeira	def.	Karl Roberson	Submission (arm-triangle choke)	1	3:21
Preliminary Card (ESPN)
Lightweight	Donald Cerrone	def.	Alexander Hernandez	TKO (head kick and punches)	2	3:43
Women's Flyweight	Joanne Calderwood	def.	Ariane Lipski	Decision (unanimous) (30–26, 30–26, 30–27)	3	5:00
Light Heavyweight	Alonzo Menifield	def.	Vinicius Moreira	TKO (punches)	1	3:56
Bantamweight	Cory Sandhagen	def.	Mario Bautista	Submission (armbar)	1	3:31
Early Preliminary Card (ESPN+)
Lightweight	Dennis Bermudez	def.	Te Edwards	Decision (unanimous) (30–26, 30–26, 30–26)	3	5:00
Welterweight	Geoff Neal	def.	Belal Muhammad	Decision (unanimous) (29–28, 30–27, 30–27)	3	5:00
Welterweight	Chance Rencountre	def.	Kyle Stewart	Submission (rear-naked choke)	1	2:25

== Bonus awards ==
The following fighters were awarded $50,000 bonuses:

- Fight of the Night: Donald Cerrone vs. Alexander Hernandez
- Performance of the Night: Henry Cejudo and Donald Cerrone

== Suspension ==
On March 20, it was announced that Dillashaw was suspended one-year due to a failed drug test in relation to this event and therefore he decided to vacate his title. He initially received a one-year suspension by the New York State Athletic Commission (NYSAC) retroactive to the event's date. On April 9, Dillashaw accepted a two-year suspension by USADA, retroactive to January 19, as it was revealed he tested positive to erythropoietin in a fight night test.

== See also ==
- List of UFC events
- 2019 in UFC
- List of current UFC fighters
- List of UFC records
- Mixed martial arts in New York
