= Jenny Liou =

American mixed martial arts fighter

- Born: Jenny Liou; June 7, 1983 (age 43); Moscow, Idaho, United States
- Height: 5 ft 6 in (1.68 m)
- Weight: 125 lb (57 kg; 8.9 st)
- Division: Strawweight
- Reach: 67.0 in (170 cm)

Mixed martial arts record
- Total: 11
- Wins: 6
- By knockout: 1
- By submission: 3
- By decision: 2
- Losses: 5
- By knockout: 3
- By decision: 2

Other information
- Mixed martial arts record from Sherdog

Jenny Liou (born June 7, 1985) is an American retired mixed martial arts cage fighter, poet, and essayist. She previously competed in the Invicta Fighting Championships in the strawweight division.

In 2022 Liou published Muscle Memory, a collection of poems that "grapple with violence and identity" with Kaya Press. Liou has published essays in Literary Hub, High Country News, and the Los Angeles Review of Books.

== Mixed martial arts record ==
Professional record breakdown
11 matches	6 wins	5 losses
By knockout	1	3
By submission	3	0
By decision	2	2

Res.	Record	Opponent	Method	Event	Date	Round	Time	Location	Notes
Loss	6–5	Andrea Lee	KO (punches)	Invicta FC 21: Anderson vs. Tweet	January 14, 2017	1	1:14	Kansas City, Missouri	
Loss	6–4	Sarah D'Alelio	Decision (unanimous)	Super Fight League 50: Seattle vs. Los Angeles	July 23, 2016	3	5:00	Tacoma, Washington	
Win	6–3	Shannon Sinn	Submission (armbar)	SCL 49: Revenge	June 25, 2016	3	2:53	Denver, Colorado	
Win	5–3	Jaymee Jones	Submission (armbar)	Xtreme Fighting League 28	April 8, 2016	1	0:59	Tulsa, Oklahoma	
Win	4–3	Heather Denny	Submission (armbar)	Super Fight League America 6	September 26, 2015	1	4:01	Tacoma, Washington	
Loss	3–3	Susy Watson	TKO (punches)	KOTC Awakening	June 4, 2015	3	1:17	Worley, Idaho	
Loss	3–2	Lacey Schuckman	TKO (punches)	Invicta FC 12: Kankaanpää vs. Souza	April 24, 2015	1	1:53	Kansas City, Missouri	
Win	3–1	Susy Watson	Decision (unanimous)	Super Fight League America 2	December 13, 2014	3	5:00	Tacoma, Washington	
Loss	2–1	Jamie Moyle	Decision (unanimous)	Invicta FC 9: Honchak vs. Hashi	November 1, 2014	3	5:00	Davenport, Iowa	
Win	2–0	Jillian Lybarger	Decision (unanimous)	KOTC Radar Lock	February 22, 2014	3	5:00	Scottsdale, Arizona	
Win	1–0	Rachael Ostovich	TKO (knee to the body and punches)	Destiny MMA	January 25, 2014	2	N/A	Honolulu, Hawaii	
