= Jamie Moyle =

American mixed martial arts fighter

- Born: Jamie Aliss Moyle; March 17, 1989 (age 37); Riverside, California, United States
- Other names: Loveboat
- Height: 5 ft 1 in (1.55 m)
- Weight: 115 lb (52 kg; 8.2 st)
- Division: Strawweight
- Fighting out of: Las Vegas, Nevada, United States
- Team: Xtreme Couture (2008–2011); Jungle MMA (2011–2012); Syndicate MMA (2012–2017); Team Alpha Male (2017–present)
- Rank: Purple belt in Brazilian Jiu-Jitsu
- Years active: 2011–resent

Mixed martial arts record
- Total: 8
- Wins: 4
- By submission: 1
- By decision: 3
- Losses: 4
- By decision: 4

Other information
- Mixed martial arts record from Sherdog

Jamie Aliss Moyle (born March 17, 1989) is an American mixed martial artist. She competes in the strawweight division.

== Background ==
Moyle started cardio kickboxing in 2008, eventually falling in love with the sport and progressing towards mixed martial arts. She also studied nursing at University of Nevada.

== Mixed martial arts career ==
=== Early career ===
Moyle made her amateur MMA debut in July 2011. Over the next three years she amassed an amateur record of 5 wins against 2 losses. She won a Tuff-n-Uff amateur tournament and was awarded a four-fight contract with Invicta Fighting Championships.

=== Invicta FC ===
She made her professional debut against Jenny Liou Shriver at Invicta FC 9: Honchak vs. Hashi on November 1, 2014. She won the fight by unanimous decision. She was awarded a Performance of the Night bonus award.

In her second fight for the promotion, Moyle faced JJ Aldrich at Invicta FC 11: Cyborg vs. Tweet on February 27, 2015. She won the fight via technical submission due to a rear-naked choke in the first round.

In her third fight for the promotion, Moyle faced Amy Montenegro at Invicta FC 13: Cyborg vs. Van Duin on July 9, 2015. She won the fight by split decision. She was awarded a Fight of the Night bonus award.

In her fourth fight for the promotion, Moyle faced Sharon Jacobson at Invicta FC 14: Evinger vs. Kianzad on September 12, 2015. She lost the fight via unanimous decision, the first loss of her professional MMA career. She was awarded a Fight of the Night bonus award.

=== The Ultimate Fighter ===
In the elimination bout Moyle defeated Alyssa Krahn via first-round submission and was the second pick of Team Joanna. As the quarter-final bout, Moyle faced Amanda Bobby Cooper. She lost the bout via majority decision and was eliminated from the season.

=== Ultimate Fighting Championship ===
In September 2016, it was announced that Moyle had signed with the Ultimate Fighting Championship. In her debut, she faced Kailin Curran at The Ultimate Fighter: Tournament of Champions Finale on December 3, 2016. She won the fight via unanimous decision.

In her second fight for the UFC, Moyle faced Viviane Pereira at UFC 212 on June 3, 2017. She lost the fight by unanimous decision.

Moyle was scheduled to face Maryna Moroz on January 30, 2018 at UFC 220. However, Moyle pulled out of the fight during the week leading up to the event citing an undisclosed injury, and the bout was cancelled.

Moyle faced Emily Whitmire on July 7, 2018 at UFC 226. She lost the fight via unanimous decision.

On August 30, Moyle was released from UFC.

=== Return to Invicta ===
Moyle faced Brianna van Buren on December 15, 2018 at Invicta FC 33: Frey vs. Grusander II. Moyle missed weight by nine pounds, weighing in at 125.1 lbs and forfeiting 25% of her purse to Van Buren. She lost the fight by unanimous decision.

== Championships and accomplishments ==
- Invicta Fighting Championships
  - Fight of the Night (Two times) vs. Amy Montenegro and Sharon Jacobson
  - Performance of the Night (One time) vs. Jenny Liou Shriver

== Mixed martial arts record ==
Professional record breakdown
8 matches	4 wins	4 losses
By submission	1	0
By decision	3	4

Res.	Record	Opponent	Method	Event	Date	Round	Time	Location	Notes
Loss	4–4	Brianna van Buren	Decision (unanimous)	Invicta FC 33: Frey vs. Grusander II	December 15, 2018	3	5:00	Kansas City, Missouri, United States	Moyle missed weight (125.1 lb).
Loss	4–3	Emily Whitmire	Decision (unanimous)	UFC 226	July 7, 2018	3	5:00	Las Vegas, Nevada, United States	
Loss	4–2	Viviane Pereira	Decision (unanimous)	UFC 212	June 3, 2017	3	5:00	Rio de Janeiro, Brazil	
Win	4–1	Kailin Curran	Decision (unanimous)	The Ultimate Fighter: Tournament of Champions Finale	December 3, 2016	3	5:00	Las Vegas, Nevada, United States	
Loss	3–1	Sharon Jacobson	Decision (unanimous)	Invicta FC 14: Evinger vs. Kianzad	September 12, 2015	3	5:00	Kansas City, Missouri, United States	Fight of the Night.
Win	3–0	Amy Montenegro	Decision (split)	Invicta FC 13: Cyborg vs. Van Duin	July 9, 2015	3	5:00	Las Vegas, Nevada, United States	Fight of the Night.
Win	2–0	JJ Aldrich	Technical Submission (rear-naked choke)	Invicta FC 11: Cyborg vs. Tweet	February 27, 2015	1	2:20	Los Angeles, California, United States	
Win	1–0	Jenny Liou Shriver	Decision (unanimous)	Invicta FC 9: Honchak vs. Hashi	November 1, 2014	3	5:00	Davenport, Iowa, United States	Strawweight debut. Performance of the Night.

=== Mixed martial arts amateur record ===
Amateur record breakdown		
9 matches	7 wins	2 losses
By knockout	2	0
By submission	1	0
By decision	4	2

Res.	Record	Opponent	Method	Event	Date	Round	Time	Location	Notes
Win	5–2	Molly Wren-Holmes	Decision (unanimous)	Tuff-N-Uff: 20th Anniversary	June 7, 2014	3	3:00	Las Vegas, Nevada, United States	Won the vacant Tuff-N-Uff Strawweight Championship
Win	4–2	Jianna Denizard	TKO (punches)	Tuff-N-Uff: Future Stars of MMA	April 11, 2014	2	2:31	Las Vegas, Nevada, United States	
Win	3–2	Stephanie Alba	Decision (unanimous)	Tuff-N-Uff: Future Stars of MMA	January 24, 2014	3	2:00	Las Vegas, Nevada, United States	
Loss	2–2	Delaney Owen	Decision (unanimous)	Fighters Source: USA Final Prelims	July 22, 2012	3	3:00	Miami, Florida, United States	
Loss	2–1	Tecia Torres	Decision (unanimous)	MMASG: Bone Island Fights	May 17, 2012	3	3:00	Key West, Florida, United States	
Win	2–0	Daynesha Bumangla	Decision (unanimous)	Atlas Fights: Cage Rage 9	October 1, 2011	3	3:00	Biloxi, Mississippi, United States	
Win	1–0	Sarah Cook	Decision (unanimous)	Breakthrough MMA: Proving Ground 1	July 1, 2011	3	3:00	Daytona Beach, Florida, United States	

== See also ==
- List of female mixed martial artists
