= Beth McCarthy =

Beth McCarthy may refer to:

- Beth McCarthy-Miller, American TV director
- Beth McCarthy, singer on The Voice UK (series 3)

== See also ==
- Elizabeth McCarthy (disambiguation)
