= Emily Kagan =

American mixed martial artist (born 1981)

- Born: Emily Peters Kagan; July 14, 1981 (age 45); Bangor, Maine, U.S.
- Height: 5 ft 3 in (1.60 m)
- Weight: 115 lb (52 kg; 8.2 st)
- Division: Strawweight
- Reach: 66.0 in (168 cm)
- Style: Jujutsu
- Team: Jackson MMA
- Rank: Black belt in Japanese Ju-Jitsu

Mixed martial arts record
- Total: 6
- Wins: 3
- By decision: 3
- Losses: 3
- By submission: 2
- By decision: 1

Other information
- University: Goucher College (B.A.)
- Mixed martial arts record from Sherdog

Emily Peters Kagan (born July 14, 1981) is an American mixed martial artist who last fought in the Strawweight division for the Ultimate Fighting Championship. She has also fought for Invicta FC.

== Mixed martial arts career ==
=== Early life and career ===
Kagan graduated from Goucher College with a degree in business management and began her amateur MMA career in March 2010, recording five wins and two losses. Kagan made her professional MMA debut in September 2012. She competed twice that year, winning both fights by decision.

=== Invicta Fighting Championships ===
In 2013, Kagan signed with the Invicta FC promotion. She made her debut on January 5, 2013 at Invicta FC 4. She lost to Rose Namajunas by submission in the third round. Kagan rebounded in her second fight for the promotion at Invicta FC 6 on July 13, 2013. She defeated Ashley Cummins by split decision.

=== Ultimate Fighting Championship ===
==== The Ultimate Fighter ====
On December 11, 2013, it was announced that Kagan was signed by the UFC along with ten other strawweight fighters to compete on The Ultimate Fighter: A Champion Will Be Crowned, which will crown the first ever UFC strawweight champion.

In the first episode, it was revealed that the UFC had seeded the fighters. Kagan was seeded 15th of 16 fighters and was paired with the no. 2 seed, Joanne Calderwood. Calderwood was picked third by Team Pettis, thereby sending Kagan to Team Melendez. In their fight, she lost the bout via majority decision.

==== After TUF ====
Kagan's first fight after The Ultimate Fighter was against Angela Hill at The Ultimate Fighter: A Champion Will Be Crowned Finale on December 12, 2014. She lost the fight by unanimous decision. Kagan last fought Kailin Curran at UFC Fight Night: Namajunas vs. VanZant in Las Vegas losing by submission. In April 2016 Kagan was officially dropped from the UFC roster.

== Mixed martial arts record ==
Professional record breakdown
| 6 matches | 3 wins | 3 losses |
| By knockout | 0 | 0 |
| By submission | 0 | 2 |
| By decision | 3 | 1 |

| Res. | Record | Opponent | Method | Event | Date | Round | Time | Location | Notes |
|---|---|---|---|---|---|---|---|---|---|
| Loss | 3–3 | Kailin Curran | Submission (rear-naked choke) | UFC Fight Night: Namajunas vs. VanZant | December 10, 2015 | 2 | 4:13 | Las Vegas, Nevada, United States | |
| Loss | 3–2 | Angela Hill | Decision (unanimous) | The Ultimate Fighter: A Champion Will Be Crowned Finale | December 12, 2014 | 3 | 5:00 | Las Vegas, Nevada, United States | |
| Win | 3–1 | Ashley Cummins | Decision (split) | Invicta FC 6: Coenen vs. Cyborg | July 13, 2013 | 3 | 5:00 | Kansas City, Missouri, United States | |
| Loss | 2–1 | Rose Namajunas | Submission (rear-naked choke) | Invicta FC 4: Esparza vs. Hyatt | January 5, 2013 | 3 | 3:44 | Kansas City, Kansas, United States | |
| Win | 2–0 | Glena Avila | Decision (split) | Dakota FC 13: Coming Home | October 13, 2012 | 3 | 5:00 | Grand Forks, North Dakota, United States | |
| Win | 1–0 | Lynae Lovato | Decision (unanimous) | Jackson's MMA Series 9 | September 8, 2012 | 3 | 5:00 | Albuquerque, New Mexico, United States | |

== See also ==
- List of select Jewish mixed martial artists
