= Jodie Esquibel =

American mixed martial arts fighter (born 1986)

- Born: May 7, 1986 (age 40); Albuquerque, New Mexico, U.S.
- Height: 5 ft 1 in (1.55 m)
- Weight: 105 lb (48 kg; 7.5 st)
- Division: Atomweight; Strawweight
- Fighting out of: Albuquerque, New Mexico, U.S.
- Team: Jackson Wink MMA
- Years active: 2011–present

Professional boxing record
- Total: 15
- Wins: 7
- By knockout: 2
- Losses: 7
- By knockout: 1
- Draws: 1

Mixed martial arts record
- Total: 13
- Wins: 6
- By knockout: 1
- By decision: 5
- Losses: 7
- By submission: 1
- By decision: 6

Other information
- Boxing record from BoxRec
- Mixed martial arts record from Sherdog

Jodie Esquibel (born May 7, 1986) is an American mixed martial artist who most recently competed in the Ultimate Fighting Championship. She has also fought for Invicta FC.

== Mixed martial arts career ==
=== Early career ===
Esquibel made her professional MMA debut in April 2011 as part of the Jackson's MMA Series. She won her first two bouts before signing with Invicta Fighting Championships.

=== Invicta FC ===
Esquibel made her Invicta FC debut against Liz McCarthy at Invicta FC 4: Esparza vs. Hyatt on January 5, 2013. She won the fight by split decision.

Esquibel next faced Alex Chambers at Invicta FC 5: Penne vs. Waterson on April 5, 2013. She lost the fight via submission in the first round, the first loss of her professional MMA career.

=== The Ultimate Fighter ===
In April 2016, it was announced that Esquibel would be a contestant on The Ultimate Fighter: Team Joanna vs. Team Cláudia. She was defeated by Ashley Yoder via split decision in the opening qualifying round.

=== Ultimate Fighting Championship ===
Esquibel made her UFC debut against Karolina Kowalkiewicz on October 21, 2017 at UFC Fight Night: Cowboy vs. Till. She lost the fight by unanimous decision.

Esquibel was scheduled to face Jessica Aguilar on June 1, 2018 at UFC Fight Night 131. Aguilar successfully weighed in, but the bout was removed from the card the day of the event by the NYSAC due to a concern over a medical issue with Aguilar. The pair eventually faced each other at UFC Fight Night 133 on July 14, 2018. Esquibel lost the bout via unanimous decision.

Esquibel was scheduled to face Jessica Penne on February 17, 2019 at UFC on ESPN 1. At the weigh-ins, Penne weighed in at 118 pounds, 2 pounds over the strawweight non-title fight upper limit of 116 pounds. As a result, the bout proceeded at catchweight and Penne was fined 20% of her purse which went to Esquibel. However Penne then injured herself on the morning of the fight and the bout was cancelled. The pairs was rescheduled to meet on April 27, 2019 at UFC Fight Night: Jacaré vs. Hermansson. However, it was reported on April 18 that Penne pulled out of the bout due to injury and she was replaced by Angela Hill Esquibel lost the bout via unanimous decision.

Esquibel faced Hannah Cifers on August 17, 2019 at UFC 241. She lost the fight by unanimous decision.

On March 19, 2020, it was reported that Esquibel was no longer part of the UFC's roster.

=== Return to Invicta Fighting Championships ===
Esquibel faced Liz Tracy at Invicta FC 44: A New Era on August 27, 2021. Esquibel lost via split decision.

== Mixed martial arts record ==
Professional record breakdown
| 13 matches | 6 wins | 7 losses |
| By knockout | 1 | 0 |
| By submission | 0 | 1 |
| By decision | 5 | 6 |

| Res. | Record | Opponent | Method | Event | Date | Round | Time | Location | Notes |
|---|---|---|---|---|---|---|---|---|---|
| Loss | 6–7 | Liz Tracy | Decision (split) | Invicta FC 44: A New Era | August 27, 2021 | 3 | 5:00 | Kansas City, Kansas, United States | Catchweight (117.2 lbs) bout |
| Loss | 6–6 | Hannah Cifers | Decision (unanimous) | UFC 241 | August 17, 2019 | 3 | 5:00 | Anaheim, California, United States | |
| Loss | 6–5 | Angela Hill | Decision (unanimous) | UFC Fight Night: Jacaré vs. Hermansson | April 27, 2019 | 3 | 5:00 | Sunrise, Florida, United States | |
| Loss | 6–4 | Jessica Aguilar | Decision (unanimous) | UFC Fight Night: dos Santos vs. Ivanov | July 14, 2018 | 3 | 5:00 | Boise, Idaho, United States | |
| Loss | 6–3 | Karolina Kowalkiewicz | Decision (unanimous) | UFC Fight Night: Cowboy vs. Till | October 21, 2017 | 3 | 5:00 | Gdańsk, Poland | |
| Win | 6–2 | DeAnna Bennett | Decision (split) | Invicta FC 22: Evinger vs. Kunitskaya II | March 25, 2017 | 3 | 5:00 | Kansas City, Missouri, United States | |
| Loss | 5–2 | Alexa Grasso | Decision (unanimous) | Invicta FC 18: Grasso vs. Esquibel | July 29, 2016 | 3 | 5:00 | Kansas City, Missouri, United States | Strawweight debut. |
| Win | 5–1 | Nicdali Rivera-Calanoc | Decision (unanimous) | Invicta FC 9: Honchak vs. Hashi | November 1, 2014 | 3 | 5:00 | Davenport, Iowa, United States | |
| Win | 4–1 | Jinh Yu Frey | Decision (split) | Invicta FC 8: Waterson vs. Tamada | September 6, 2014 | 3 | 5:00 | Kansas City, Missouri, United States | |
| Loss | 3–1 | Alex Chambers | Submission (rear-naked choke) | Invicta FC 5: Penne vs. Waterson | April 5, 2013 | 1 | 1:35 | Kansas City, Missouri, United States | |
| Win | 3–0 | Liz McCarthy | Decision (split) | Invicta FC 4: Esparza vs. Hyatt | January 5, 2013 | 3 | 5:00 | Kansas City, Kansas, United States | Atomweight debut. |
| Win | 2–0 | Amy Riehle | Decision (unanimous) | Jackson's MMA Series 7 | January 21, 2012 | 3 | 5:00 | Albuquerque, New Mexico, United States | Catchweight (109 lbs) bout. |
| Win | 1–0 | Brittany Horton | TKO (head kick and punches) | Jackson's MMA Series 4 | April 9, 2011 | 1 | 3:59 | Albuquerque, New Mexico, United States | |

== Professional boxing record ==
| 15 fights | 7 wins | 7 losses |
|---|---|---|
| By knockout | 2 | 1 |
| By decision | 5 | 6 |
| Draws | 1 | |

| 15 | Win | 7–7–1 | (Mexico) Mayela Perez | SD | 8, 3:00 | May 9, 2015 | (United States) Buffalo Thunder Casino, Pojoaque, New Mexico, USA | NABF female minimumweight title |
| 14 | Loss | 6–7–1 | (United States) Eileen Olszewski | UD | 6, 2:00 | Jan 18, 2014 | (United States) Five Star Banquet, Long Island City, Queens, New York, USA | vacant Universal Boxing Federation (UBF) International female flyweight title |
| 13 | Loss | 6–6–1 | (South Korea) Ji Hyun Park | SD | 10, 2:00 | Dec 11, 2011 | City Gymnasium, Geoje, South Korea | International Female Boxers Association World minimumweight title |
| 12 | Win | 6–5–1 | (United States) Savanna Hill | UD | 6, 2:00 | Dec 3, 2010 | (United States) Route 66 Casino, Albuquerque, New Mexico, USA | |
| 11 | Loss | 5–5–1 | (United States) Suzannah Warner | SD | 8, 2:00 | Dec 4, 2009 | (United States) Isleta Casino & Resort, Albuquerque, New Mexico, USA | vacant NABF female minimumweight title |
| 10 | Loss | 5–4–1 | (South Korea) Ji Hyun Park | UD | 10, 2:00 | Jul 25, 2009 | City Gymnasium, Bucheon, South Korea | International Female Boxers Association World minimumweight title |
| 9 | Loss | 5–3–1 | (United States) Carina Moreno | TKO | 9, 1:36 | Oct 23, 2008 | (United States) Tachi Palace Hotel & Casino, Lemoore, California, USA | WBC World female minimumweight title Women's International Boxing Association World minimumweight title |
| 8 | Draw | 5–2–1 | (United States) Ava Knight | MD | 4, 2:00 | Jan 11, 2008 | (United States) Isleta Casino & Resort, Albuquerque, New Mexico, USA | |
| 7 | Win | 5–2 | (United States) Melissa Shaffer | SD | 5, 2:00 | Aug 18, 2007 | (United States) Sky Ute Casino, Ignacio, Colorado, USA | |
| 6 | Loss | 4–2 | (United States) Chantel Cordova | UD | 4, 2:00 | Jan 4, 2007 | (United States) Harrah's Casino & Resort, Mayetta, Kansas, USA | |
| 5 | Win | 4–1 | (United States) Holly Kunisch | TKO | 1, 1:10 | Dec 1, 2006 | (United States) Isleta Casino & Resort, Albuquerque, New Mexico, USA | |
| 4 | Loss | 3–1 | (United States) Melissa Shaffer | UD | 4, 2:00 | Sep 9, 2006 | (United States) Emerald Queen Casino, Tacoma, Washington, USA | |
| 3 | Win | 3–0 | (United States) Melissa Shaffer | UD | 4, 2:00 | May 13, 2006 | (United States) Ford Pavilion Expo NM, Albuquerque, New Mexico, USA | |
| 2 | Win | 2–0 | (United States) Suzannah Warner | UD | 4, 2:00 | Oct 28, 2005 | (United States) Michael Marr Gymnasium, Las Vegas, New Mexico, USA | |
| 1 | Win | 1–0 | (United States) Doreen Hilton | TKO | 2, 1:39 | Jun 24, 2005 | (United States) sleta Casino & Resort, Albuquerque, New Mexico, USA | |
