= Kailin Curran =

American mixed martial arts (MMA) fighter

- Born: Jaydene Kailin Asoa Curran; April 11, 1991 (age 35); Ewa Beach, Hawaii, U.S.
- Height: 5 ft 3 in (1.60 m)
- Weight: 115 lb (52 kg; 8.2 st)
- Division: Strawweight
- Reach: 64.0 in (163 cm)
- Style: Wrestling
- Team: Gracie Technics (until 2013); Reign MMA academy (2013–2015); RVCA (2015–present)
- Years active: 2013–present

Mixed martial arts record
- Total: 13
- Wins: 6
- By submission: 1
- By decision: 5
- Losses: 7
- By knockout: 1
- By submission: 3
- By decision: 3

Other information
- Notable school: James Campbell High School
- Mixed martial arts record from Sherdog

Jaydene Kailin Asoa Curran (born April 11, 1991) is an American mixed martial artist who competes in the strawweight division. She previously fought for the Ultimate Fighting Championship.

== Early life ==
Curran was born and raised in Ewa Beach, Hawaii. She attended James Campbell High School where she was a member of the wrestling team. Curran is of Samoan, Hawaiian, Irish and German descent.

== Mixed martial arts career ==
=== Early career ===
Curran began her amateur MMA career in 2010, amassing a record of 4 wins, 1 loss and 1 No Contest over the next two years.

Curran made her professional debut in March 2013 for the Pacific Xtreme Combat promotion in her native Hawaii. She was undefeated in her run with the company, winning all fights by unanimous decision.

=== Ultimate Fighting Championship ===
In November 2014, Curran made her Ultimate Fighting Championship (UFC) debut against Paige VanZant. She lost the fight via TKO in the third round. Despite the loss, she was awarded Fight of the Night honors.

In her second fight for the promotion, Curran faced Alex Chambers at UFC Fight Night: Miocic vs. Hunt. Despite controlling the majority of the bout, Curran lost via submission in the third round.

Curran then faced Emily Kagan at UFC Fight Night: Namajunas vs. VanZant. She won the bout via submission in the second round.

Curran faced Felice Herrig at UFC on Fox: Holm vs. Shevchenko. She lost the fight via submission in the first round.

Curran then faced Jamie Moyle at The Ultimate Fighter: Tournament of Champions Finale. She lost the fight via unanimous decision.

Curran next faced Aleksandra Albu on July 29, 2017 at UFC 214. She lost the fight via unanimous decision.

Curran faced Yan Xiaonan on 25 November 2017 at UFC Fight Night: Silva vs. Gastelum. She lost the fight by unanimous decision. After her 4th straight loss she was released from the roster in March 2018. Her record in the promotion was 1-6.

== Personal life ==
Curran married surfer Keanu Asing on August 13, 2017 in San Clemente, California.

== Championships and accomplishments ==
=== Mixed martial arts ===
- Ultimate Fighting Championship
  - Fight of the Night (One time) vs. Paige VanZant

== Mixed martial arts record ==
Professional record breakdown
13 matches	6 wins	7 losses
By knockout	0	1
By submission	1	3
By decision	5	3

Res.	Record	Opponent	Method	Event	Date	Round	Time	Location	Notes
Loss	6–7	Brianna Van Buren	Submission (rear-naked choke)	Invicta Phoenix Series 1	May 3, 2019	2	3:49	Kansas City, Kansas, United States	Invicta FC Strawweight Tournament Final. For the vacant Invicta FC Strawweight Championship.
Win	6–6	Sharon Jacobson	Decision (unanimous)	Invicta Phoenix Series 1	May 3, 2019	1	5:00	Kansas City, Kansas, United States	Invicta FC Strawweight Tournament Semifinal.
Win	5–6	Sunna Davíðsdóttir	Decision (split)	Invicta Phoenix Series 1	May 3, 2019	1	5:00	Kansas City, Kansas, United States	Invicta FC Strawweight Tournament Quarterfinal.
Loss	4–6	Yan Xiaonan	Decision (unanimous)	UFC Fight Night: Bisping vs. Gastelum	November 25, 2017	3	5:00	Shanghai, China	
Loss	4–5	Aleksandra Albu	Decision (unanimous)	UFC 214	July 29, 2017	3	5:00	Anaheim, California, United States	
Loss	4–4	Jamie Moyle	Decision (unanimous)	The Ultimate Fighter: Tournament of Champions Finale	December 3, 2016	3	5:00	Las Vegas, Nevada, United States	
Loss	4–3	Felice Herrig	Submission (rear-naked choke)	UFC on Fox: Holm vs. Shevchenko	July 23, 2016	1	1:59	Chicago, Illinois, United States	
Win	4–2	Emily Kagan	Submission (rear-naked choke)	UFC Fight Night: Namajunas vs. VanZant	December 10, 2015	2	4:13	Las Vegas, Nevada, United States	
Loss	3–2	Alex Chambers	Submission (armbar)	UFC Fight Night: Miocic vs. Hunt	May 10, 2015	3	3:15	Adelaide, Australia	
Loss	3–1	Paige VanZant	TKO (punches)	UFC Fight Night: Edgar vs. Swanson	November 22, 2014	3	2:54	Austin, Texas, United States	Fight of the Night.
Win	3–0	Yoo Jin Jung	Decision (unanimous)	Pacific Xtreme Combat 42	February 28, 2014	3	5:00	Mangilao, Guam	
Win	2–0	Emi Tomimatsu	Decision (unanimous)	Pacific Xtreme Combat 38	August 9, 2013	3	5:00	Mangilao, Guam	
Win	1–0	Kaiyana Rain	Decision (unanimous)	Pacific Xtreme Combat 36	March 8, 2013	3	5:00	Mangilao, Guam	Strawweight debut.
