= Ashley Cummins =

American mixed martial arts (MMA) fighter

- Born: August 2, 1987 (age 39); St. Louis County, Missouri, United States
- Other names: Smashley
- Height: 5 ft 3 in (160 cm)
- Weight: 105 lb (48 kg; 7 st 7 lb)
- Division: Strawweight (2011-2016); Atomweight (2017-present)
- Reach: 61 in (155 cm)
- Style: Boxing, Muay Thai, Brazilian jiu-jitsu
- Stance: Orthodox
- Fighting out of: San Diego, United States
- Team: Wolves Den MMA (2011-2018); San Diego Combat Academy (2018–present)
- Years active: 2011 - present

Mixed martial arts record
- Total: 14
- Wins: 7
- By submission: 2
- By decision: 5
- Losses: 7
- By knockout: 1
- By submission: 1
- By decision: 5

Amateur record
- Total: 8
- Wins: 8
- By submission: 4
- Losses: 0

Other information
- Mixed martial arts record from Sherdog

Ashley Cummins (born August 2, 1987) is an American mixed martial artist who competes in the Atomweight division. She has previously fought in Invicta FC.

== Personal life ==
Cummins started martial arts as a child with karate. She continued as a practitioner until she reached 18 years old. It was later that she started Brazilian Jiu-Jitsu, muay thai and boxing.

She currently works as a police officer and animal rescuer for the St. Louis Metropolitan Police Department.

== Mixed martial arts career ==
=== Early career ===
Cummins was scheduled to make her professional debut against Chelsea Colarelli at XFN 5, for Colarelli's XFL Strawweight title. Her debut came after a successful amateur career, during which she went on a perfect 8–0 run. Cummins won the fight by a fifth-round rear-naked choke, following a back-and-forth fight.

Cummins was scheduled to fight Stephanie Frausto at NAAFS: Caged Fury 16. She won the fight by a unanimous decision.

=== Invicta FC ===
==== Invicta FC Strawweight career ====
Cummins was scheduled to make her debut with Invicta FC at their very first event, against Sofia Bagherdai. She won the fight by unanimous decision.

In her second fight with the organization, Cummins was scheduled to fight Joanne Calderwood at Invicta FC 3: Penne vs. Sugiyama. Cummins lost the fight by a first-round knockout. Cummins lost vision in one of her eyes during the bout, as a results of a punch, which didn't return following the end of the fight. The injury required surgery, with her vision returning two months later.

Following her eye surgery, Cummins returned to fight Emily Kagan at Invicta FC 6: Cyborg vs. Coenen 2. Cummins lost the fight by split decision, although the majority of media members awarded her the victory.

Cummins was scheduled to fight Alexa Grasso at Invicta FC 8: Waterson vs. Tamada. Grasso won by unanimous decision, extending Cummins' losing streak to three fights.

She briefly left Invicta to fight Nicole Smith at Bellator 157: Dynamite 2. Cummins won the fight by submission.

==== Invicta FC Atomweight career ====
In her next fight, Cummins moved down to atomweight to fight Amber Brown at Invicta FC 22: Evinger vs. Kunitskaya II. Brown was likewise moving down to atomweight from strawweight. Cummins won the fight by unanimous decision. This victory earned Cummins a "Performance of the Night" award.

After her successful atomweight debut, Cummins was scheduled to fight the one-time Invicta Atomweight title challenger Jinh Yu Frey at Invicta FC 24: Dudieva vs. Borella. Frey won the fight by unanimous decision, winning all three rounds of a bout that consisted mostly of grappling exchanges.

Cummins was scheduled to fight Stephanie Alba at Invicta FC 27: Kaufman vs. Kianzad. She won the fight by unanimous decision.

Cummins fought Jéssica Delboni at Invicta FC 32: Spencer vs. Sorenson in a potential number-one challenger bout. She won the fight by unanimous decision.

Her last two victories earned Cummins the chance to fight a rematch with the reigning Invicta Atomweight champion Jinh Yu Frey at Invicta FC 39: Frey vs. Cummins II. Frey came into the bout 0.8 lbs over the title limit of 105 lbs, which resulted in her being stripped of the championship belt and only Cummins being eligible to win the title. Frey won the fight by unanimous decision.

Due to Frey missing weight, the Invicta FC Atomweight title was left vacant. A rematch was impossible, as Frey signed with the UFC in the meantime. As a results of all this, Cummins was scheduled to fight Alesha Zappitella for the vacant title at Invicta FC 42: Cummins vs. Zappitella. Cummins was the more dominant party throughout the first two rounds, winning the majority of striking exchanges and stopping Zappitella's takedowns. In the first minute of the third round, Zappitella managed to land an early takedown and countered Cummins' guillotine choke attempt with a Von Flue choke. It was the first Von Flue choke finish in Invicta FC history.

=== Bellator MMA ===
Cummins faced Randi Field on March 31, 2023 at Bellator 293. She lost the fight by unanimous decision.

== Championships and accomplishments ==
- Xtreme Fighting League
  - XFL Strawweight Championship
- Invicta Fighting Championships
  - Performance of the Night (One Time) vs. Amber Brown

== Mixed martial arts record ==
Professional record breakdown
14 matches	7 wins	7 losses
By knockout	0	1
By submission	2	1
By decision	5	5

Res.	Record	Opponent	Method	Event	Date	Round	Time	Location	Notes
Loss	7–7	Randi Field	Decision (unanimous)	Bellator 293	March 31, 2023	3	5:00	Temecula, California, United States	Catchweight (120 lb) bout.
Loss	7–6	Alesha Zappitella	Submission (shoulder choke)	Invicta FC 42: Cummins vs. Zappitella	September 17, 2020	4	1:20	Kansas City, Kansas, United States	For the vacant Invicta FC Atomweight Championship.
Loss	7–5	Jinh Yu Frey	Decision (unanimous)	Invicta FC 39: Frey vs. Cummins II	February 7, 2020	5	5:00	Kansas City, Kansas, United States	For the vacant Invicta FC Atomweight Championship. Frey missed weight (105.8 lb) and was stripped of the title. Only Cummins was eligible to win the title.
Win	7–4	Jéssica Delboni	Decision (unanimous)	Invicta FC 32: Spencer vs. Sorenson	November 16, 2018	3	5:00	Shawnee, Oklahoma, United States	
Win	6–4	Stephanie Alba	Decision (unanimous)	Invicta FC 27: Kaufman vs. Kianzad	January 13, 2018	3	5:00	Kansas City, Missouri, United States	
Loss	5–4	Jinh Yu Frey	Decision (unanimous)	Invicta FC 24: Dudieva vs. Borella	July 15, 2017	3	5:00	Kansas City, Missouri, United States	
Win	5–3	Amber Brown	Decision (unanimous)	Invicta FC 22: Evinger vs. Kunitskaya II	March 25, 2017	3	5:00	Kansas City, Missouri, United States	Atomweight debut. Performance of the Night.
Win	4–3	Nicole Smith	Technical Submission (knee on neck choke)	Bellator 157: Dynamite 2	June 24, 2016	2	1:33	St. Louis, Missouri, United States	
Loss	3–3	Alexa Grasso	Decision (unanimous)	Invicta FC 8: Waterson vs. Tamada	September 6, 2014	3	5:00	Kansas City, Missouri, United States	
Loss	3–2	Emily Kagan	Decision (split)	Invicta FC 6: Cyborg vs. Coenen 2	July 13, 2013	3	5:00	Kansas City, Missouri, United States	
Loss	3–1	Joanne Calderwood	KO (knee to the body)	Invicta FC 3: Penne vs. Sugiyama	October 6, 2012	1	3:13	Kansas City, Kansas, United States	
Win	3–0	Sofia Bagherdai	Decision (unanimous)	Invicta FC 1: Coenen vs. Ruyssen	April 28, 2012	3	5:00	Kansas City, Kansas, United States	Catchweight (120 lb) bout.
Win	2–0	Stephanie Frausto	Decision (unanimous)	NAAFS: Caged Fury 16	January 28, 2012	3	3:00	Morgantown, West Virginia, United States	
Win	1–0	Chelsea Colarelli	Submission (rear-naked choke)	Xtreme Fight Night 5	November 18, 2011	5	1:41	Tulsa, Oklahoma	Strawweight debut.

== See also ==
- List of female mixed martial artists
