= Paige VanZant =

American professional wrestler (born 1994)

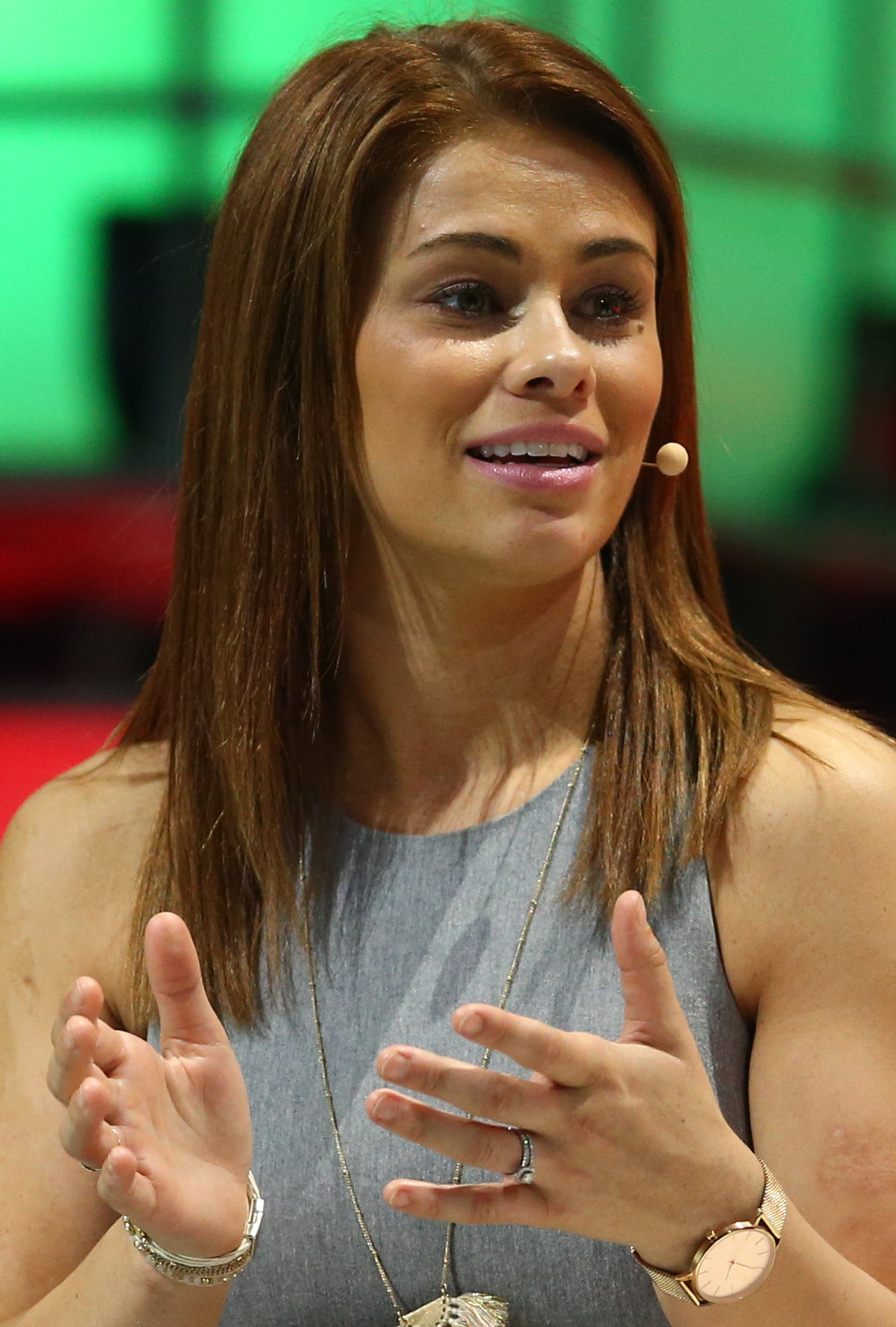
- VanZant in 2019
- Born: Paige Michelle Sletten; March 26, 1994 (age 32); Dundee, Oregon, U.S.
- Other names: Paige Vanderford
- Nickname: 12 Gauge
- Height: 5 ft 4 in (163 cm)
- Weight: 125 lb (57 kg; 8 st 13 lb)
- Division: Strawweight (2012–2017); Flyweight (2017–present)
- Reach: 65 in (165 cm)
- Fighting out of: Coconut Creek, Florida
- Team: Team Alpha Male (2013–2017); Team Quest (2017–2019); American Top Team Portland (2017–2020); American Top Team Miami (2020–present)
- Trainer: Pedro Diaz (boxing)
- Rank: Purple belt in Brazilian jiu-jitsu under Fabiano Scherner
- Years active: 2012–present

Professional boxing record
- Total: 1
- Draws: 1

Mixed martial arts record
- Total: 13
- Wins: 8
- By knockout: 2
- By submission: 3
- By decision: 3
- Losses: 5
- By submission: 3
- By decision: 2

Amateur record
- Total: 1
- Wins: 1
- By submission: 1

Other information
- Spouse: Austin Vanderford (m. 2018)
- Mixed martial arts record from Sherdog
Paige VanZant
Professional wrestling career
- Ring name: Paige VanZant
- Billed height: 5 ft 4 in (163 cm)
- Billed weight: 115 lb (52 kg)
- Trained by: Gangrel
- Debut: May 29, 2022

Paige Michelle VanZant (née Sletten; married name Vanderford; born March 26, 1994) is an American mixed martial artist, bare knuckle boxer, professional wrestler, professional boxer, slap fighter, author, model, and OnlyFans content creator. VanZant was previously signed to the Ultimate Fighting Championship, where she competed in the strawweight and flyweight divisions. Outside of mixed martial arts, VanZant has been involved in professional wrestling with All Elite Wrestling and in boxing with Bare Knuckle Fighting Championship. Additionally, VanZant has appeared on the television shows Dancing with the Stars and Chopped.

== Early life ==
VanZant was born in Dundee, Oregon, and raised in Sherwood, Oregon, both near Portland. Her parents owned a dance studio, and she was brought up dancing ballet, jazz, and hip hop for over 13 years. As a teen, she appeared in a mop commercial for Bissell. She was considered a tomboy while growing up and loved the outdoors; her hobbies included riding dirt bikes and fishing. In high school, she was sexually assaulted and regularly bullied by a group of girls. The bullying included mocking her surname Sletten, which students changed to "Slutton". She eventually changed her surname legally to VanZant because of the persistent bullying. She chose "VanZant" because it was one of her mother's students' last names and she liked the way it sounded. However, she has noted this experience as one of the reasons she likes being a martial artist and having the ability to defend herself.

== Martial arts career ==
=== Early career ===
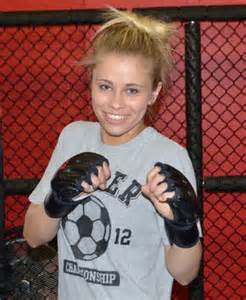
VanZant in 2012, prior to her first amateur bout

After VanZant moved with her family to Sparks, Nevada, she was looking for a dance studio when she came across UFC veteran Ken Shamrock's gym, where she began training in boxing and other martial arts. After winning an amateur fight at age 18, VanZant made her professional MMA debut on June 30, 2012, at UWF's Tournament of Warriors finale against Jordan Nicole Gaza in Corpus Christi, Texas, winning by split decision. On September 22, 2012, she faced Amber Stautzenberger at Premier Fight Series 2 and won via unanimous decision.

VanZant faced Tecia Torres at Invicta FC 4: Esparza vs. Hyatt. The event was held on January 5, 2013, at the Memorial Hall in Kansas City, Kansas. VanZant was dominated on the feet for much of the fight and lost to Torres via a unanimous decision.

=== Ultimate Fighting Championship (2013–2020) ===
==== Strawweight division ====
In December 2013, VanZant was announced as one of 11 women signed by the Ultimate Fighting Championship (UFC) for its newly created Strawweight division. It was also announced that she would compete as a cast member on The Ultimate Fighter, a television reality series, as part of a tournament to crown the inaugural strawweight champion. However, on March 31, 2014, VanZant was turned away from the reality series because she was only 20 years old, and the minimum age to compete on it is 21 due to the presence of alcohol in the house.

In August 2014, the UFC announced that VanZant would face Kailin Curran on October 4, 2014, in Halifax at UFC Fight Night: MacDonald vs. Saffiedine, but VanZant suffered a back injury and the bout was rescheduled for UFC Fight Night: Edgar vs. Swanson. VanZant marked her UFC debut by defeating Curran by TKO in the third round, in a fight that would win Fight of the Night honors.

After defeating Kailin Curran, VanZant enjoyed an increase in popularity. In February 2015, she was signed to a sponsorship deal with Reebok. This became a source of controversy due to her having only one UFC fight at the time. Some media outlets and fighters speculated that VanZant only received the deal due to her physical attractiveness. UFC president Dana White responded that she received the Reebok deal because of her "it" factor and personality.

VanZant faced Felice Herrig on April 18, 2015, in Newark, New Jersey, at UFC on Fox: Machida vs. Rockhold. Following a competitive first round, VanZant eventually overwhelmed Herrig with her grappling, winning by unanimous decision.

VanZant faced Alex Chambers on September 5, 2015, at UFC 191. After controlling most of the fight with aggressive strikes and grappling, she won via armbar submission in the third round.

VanZant signed a new contract with UFC on September 17, 2015. VanZant was expected headline UFC Fight Night 80 on December 10, 2015, against Joanne Calderwood. However, Calderwood was pulled from the fight in October and replaced by Rose Namajunas. VanZant lost the one-sided fight via submission in the fifth round.

Following her time on Dancing with the Stars, VanZant returned to the cage to face Bec Rawlings on August 27, 2016, at UFC on Fox: Maia vs. Condit. She won the fight via KO in the second round after landing a flying head kick and a flurry of follow-up punches. The win earned VanZant her first Performance of the Night bonus award.

In her next bout, VanZant faced Michelle Waterson on December 17, 2016, in the main event at UFC on Fox: VanZant vs. Waterson. She lost the fight via technical submission due to a rear-naked choke in the first round.

She ended her run in the strawweight division ranked No. 12.

==== Flyweight division ====
In August 2017, VanZant moved to the 125-pound flyweight division and was booked against Jessica Eye at UFC 216 on October 7. However, VanZant pulled out of the fight on September 25 citing a back injury, and further ailments such as a herniated disc, sinus infection, double ear infection, pink eye and ringworm.

VanZant's debut in the flyweight division eventually took place in 2018 as she faced Jessica Rose-Clark on January 14, 2018, at UFC Fight Night: Stephens vs. Choi. After breaking her arm in the second round when attempting a spinning backfist, she lost the fight via unanimous decision.

After a year hiatus from competition due to a broken arm, VanZant faced Rachael Ostovich on January 19, 2019, at UFC Fight Night: Cejudo vs. Dillashaw. She won the fight via armbar submission in the second round.

VanZant was briefly linked to a matchup with Poliana Botelho on April 13, 2019, at UFC 236. However, just days after the pairing was leaked, VanZant announced that she would not be competing on the card due to a fractured right arm. Botelho remained on the card to face Lauren Mueller.

Initially, VanZant was told that she wouldn't require surgery on her arm and was targeting a return to the octagon in July. However, in early June, she told ESPN that the bone in her arm had not healed and that she would have to undergo surgery. She was projected to be sidelined for around three months.

VanZant was scheduled to face Amanda Ribas on March 14, 2020, at UFC Fight Night 170. However, VanZant was forced to pull out of the fight due to fracturing her right arm again (third such time for VanZant). She stated the injury was small and only needed 6–8 weeks to heal. VanZant requested to reschedule the bout one month later but Ribas decided to remain at the event and Randa Markos stepped in as the replacement. The bout with Ribas was rescheduled and eventually took place on July 12, 2020, at UFC 251. VanZant lost the fight via a submission in round one.

=== Bare Knuckle Fighting Championship (2020–present) ===
In August 2020, VanZant signed a four-bout contract to fight exclusively in the Bare Knuckle Fighting Championship reportedly worth over $1 million.

VanZant made her debut for the promotion on February 5, 2021, against Britain Hart in the main event of BKFC Knucklemania in Tampa, Florida. She lost the fight via unanimous decision.

VanZant faced Rachael Ostovich – whom she defeated in mixed martial arts at UFC Fight Night: Cejudo vs. Dillashaw – at BKFC 19 on July 23, 2021. She lost the bout via unanimous decision. This fight earned her the Fight of the Night award. Following the loss, VanZant indicated her interest to resume MMA competition, speaking of her openness to join Bellator MMA.

VanZant was scheduled to face Charisa Sigala at BKFC 27 on August 20, 2022. However, the fight was postponed to October 15, but was ultimately cancelled a week before the event.

=== Misfits Boxing (2024–present) ===
==== VanZant vs Brooke ====
On April 19, 2024, it was announced that VanZant would make her professional boxing debut with Misfits Boxing on May 25 at the NRG Arena in Houston, Texas, against English OnlyFans model Elle Brooke as the headline bout for MF & DAZN: X Series 15 for the MFB women's middleweight championship. VanZant later revealed that she had signed a multi-fight deal with Misfits Boxing. The bout ended in a split draw.

=== Power Slap (2024–present) ===
VanZant made her slap fighting debut against Christine Volmarans at Power Slap 8 on June 28, 2024. She won the bout by unanimous decision.

VanZant made her second slap fighting appearance against Chelsea Dodson on October 24, 2024 at Power Slap 9. The bout ended in a draw.

VanZant faced Mikael-Michelle Brown on March 7, 2025 at Power Slap 12. She won the bout by unanimous decision.

VanZant was scheduled to rematch Mikael-Michelle Brown on June 27, 2025 at Power Slap 13 for the inaugural Power Slap Flyweight Championship, however she suffered a self-described "freak" neck injury and was forced to withdraw.

=== Global Fight League (2025–present) ===
On January 2, 2025, it was reported that VanZant had signed with Global Fight League. She was scheduled to make her debut on May 25, 2025 on the main card of Dillon Danis vs Tony Ferguson in Los Angeles, California in a lightweight bout against Randi Field. However, all GFL events were cancelled indefinitely.

== Mixed martial arts fighting style ==
VanZant typically attacks with aggressive grappling, then seeks to finish the fight with strikes. Her style includes ground-and-pound, dirty boxing, and a wide variety of clinch striking. While standing, she will often move the fight toward the fence and use knees, elbows, forearms, punches, and throws.

VanZant is noted for the constant pressure she applies while grappling. If an opponent escapes her clinch, she will usually look to close the distance again within moments. At UFC Fight Night 57, Kailin Curran struggled to establish range against VanZant. During their three-round bout, Felice Herrig was repeatedly held down by VanZant's grappling. The first fighter to defeat VanZant, Tecia Torres, largely avoided her clinch while attacking with strikes near the center of the cage. While fighting from a distance, she typically attacks with high kicks and punches. She credits her past experiences dancing with her ability to perform flexible and agile movements in her fights; she demonstrated this when she knocked out Bec Rawlings with a jumping switch kick which earned her a "Performance of the Night" bonus.

In addition to her striking, VanZant has a purple belt in Brazilian Jiu-Jitsu.

== Professional wrestling career ==
On September 15, 2021, VanZant made her first professional wrestling appearance, appearing for All Elite Wrestling (AEW) on their Dynamite program with fighters from American Top Team. The following week on Rampage: Grand Slam, VanZant attacked Chris Jericho.

On the February 2, 2022, episode of Dynamite, American Top Team's Dan Lambert introduced VanZant to Brandi Rhodes, with VanZant later attacking Rhodes at his behest. The angle between VanZant and Rhodes was dropped after Brandi and her husband Cody announced that they were leaving AEW. On March 4, AEW founder Tony Khan tweeted that VanZant would sign with the promotion. VanZant appeared alongside her husband Austin Vanderford in the audience on the March 9 episode of Dynamite. During the main event, she attacked Tay Conti at ringside, distracting Sammy Guevara and assisting Scorpio Sky to win the TNT Championship. After the match, VanZant signed her AEW contract on top of Tay's body. On the May 27 episode of Rampage, it was announced that VanZant would make her in-ring debut at Double or Nothing, teaming with Ethan Page and Scorpio Sky to face Conti, Guevara, and Frankie Kazarian. At the event, VanZant's team was victorious. VanZant last appeared for AEW in May 2022. After two years of inactivity, VanZant's profile was removed from the AEW website roster page on June 3, 2024, signifying her official departure from the company.

== Media appearances ==
=== Dancing with the Stars ===
On March 8, 2016, VanZant was announced as one of the celebrities who would compete on season 22 of Dancing with the Stars. She partnered with professional dancer Mark Ballas. The couple reached the finals of the show and finished in second place behind model Nyle DiMarco and his partner Peta Murgatroyd.

Week #	Dance/Song	Judges' score			Result
Week #	Dance/Song	Inaba	Goodman	Tonioli	Result
1	Foxtrot / "Ain't Got Far to Go"	7	7	7	No Elimination
2^{1}	Salsa / "Danza Kuduro"	8	8	8	Safe
3	Paso Doble / "300 Violin Orchestra"	8	7	8	Safe
4	Quickstep / "You've Got a Friend in Me"	9	9/9^{2}	9	Safe
5^{3}	Rumba / "Perfect"	8	8/7^{4}	8	No Elimination
6	Jazz / "Soul Bossa Nova"	9	10	9	Last to be called safe
7	Jive / "Proud Mary"; Team Freestyle / "End of Time", "If I Were a Boy" & "Crazy in Love"	10; 8	10; 8	10; 9	Safe
8	Viennese Waltz / "Stone Cold"; Team-up Dance (Paso Doble) / "Everybody Wants to Rule the World"	10; 9^{5}	9; 10	9; 10	Safe
9 Semi-finals	Trio Samba / "Hip Hip Chin Chin"; Argentine Tango / "One Time"	10; 10	10; 9	10; 10	Last to be called safe
10; Finals	Salsa / "Fireball"; Freestyle / "Over the Rainbow"; Salsa & Jive Fusion / "Little Bitty Pretty One"	10; 10; 10	9; 10; 10	10; 10; 10	Runner-up

^{1} For this week, VanZant performed with troupe member Alan Bersten due to Ballas suffering a back injury during rehearsals.
^{2} Score given by guest judge Zendaya.
^{3} For this week only, as part of "America's Switch Up", VanZant performed with Sasha Farber instead of Ballas. Ballas performed with Ginger Zee.
^{4} Score given by guest judge Maksim Chmerkovskiy.
^{5} Due to Inaba being the judge coaching VanZant's team during the team-up dance, the viewers scored the dance in her place with the average score being counted alongside the remaining judges.

=== Chopped ===
On March 3, 2017, VanZant was announced as one of 16 celebrities taking part in a celebrity cooking competition on the Food Network TV series Chopped. She was featured in the "Star Power: Culinary Muscle" episode, alongside former NFL player LaMarr Woodley, female Olympic gold medalist fencer Mariel Zagunis, and former Olympic gold medalist figure skater Dorothy Hamill. VanZant made it through the appetizer, and entree rounds to compete in the dessert round against Hamill. She then edged out Hamill in the dessert round to become the Chopped winner.

== Writings ==
VanZant released her biography, Rise: Surviving the Fight of My Life on April 10, 2018. The book details her rise to fame, including her UFC battles, personal battles and appearances on Dancing with the Stars.

== Personal life ==
Her father nicknamed her "12 Gauge" because of her love of shooting and hunting.

She has modeled for Nike and Columbia Sportswear.

In May 2018, VanZant confirmed that she had a breast augmentation, saying: "I'm a girl and always wanted my own boobs. They never came so I bought them."

In September 2018, VanZant married Austin Vanderford, a professional MMA fighter and a two-time NAIA All-American and national champion wrestler. The couple began dating the previous year, and Vanderford proposed to VanZant in January 2018.

In September 2023, VanZant claimed in an interview with Barstool Sports that she had earned more money in a 24-hour period with OnlyFans than she had in her entire fight career.

== Championships and accomplishments ==
=== Mixed martial arts ===
- Ultimate Fighting Championship
  - Fight of the Night (One time) vs. Kailin Curran
  - Performance of the Night (One time) vs. Bec Rawlings
  - UFC.com Awards
    - 2014: Ranked No. 10 Newcomer of the Year (Tied with Henry Cejudo & Carla Esparza)
- MMAjunkie.com
  - 2019 January Submission of the Month vs. Rachael Ostovich

=== Bare-knuckle boxing ===
- Bare Knuckle Fighting Championship
  - Fight of the Night (One time) vs. Rachael Ostovich

== Mixed martial arts record ==
Professional record breakdown
13 matches	8 wins	5 losses
By knockout	2	0
By submission	3	3
By decision	3	2

Res.	Record	Opponent	Method	Event	Date	Round	Time	Location	Notes
Loss	8–5	Amanda Ribas	Submission (armbar)	UFC 251	July 12, 2020	1	2:21	Abu Dhabi, United Arab Emirates	
Win	8–4	Rachael Ostovich	Submission (armbar)	UFC Fight Night: Cejudo vs. Dillashaw	January 19, 2019	2	1:50	Brooklyn, New York, United States	
Loss	7–4	Jessica-Rose Clark	Decision (unanimous)	UFC Fight Night: Stephens vs. Choi	January 14, 2018	3	5:00	St. Louis, Missouri, United States	Flyweight debut.
Loss	7–3	Michelle Waterson	Technical Submission (rear-naked choke)	UFC on Fox: VanZant vs. Waterson	December 17, 2016	1	3:21	Sacramento, California, United States	
Win	7–2	Bec Rawlings	KO (head kick and punches)	UFC on Fox: Maia vs. Condit	August 27, 2016	2	0:17	Vancouver, British Columbia, Canada	Performance of the Night.
Loss	6–2	Rose Namajunas	Submission (rear-naked choke)	UFC Fight Night: Namajunas vs. VanZant	December 10, 2015	5	2:25	Las Vegas, Nevada, United States	
Win	6–1	Alex Chambers	Submission (armbar)	UFC 191	September 5, 2015	3	1:01	Las Vegas, Nevada, United States	
Win	5–1	Felice Herrig	Decision (unanimous)	UFC on Fox: Machida vs. Rockhold	April 18, 2015	3	5:00	Newark, New Jersey, United States	
Win	4–1	Kailin Curran	TKO (punches)	UFC Fight Night: Edgar vs. Swanson	November 22, 2014	3	2:54	Austin, Texas, United States	Fight of the Night.
Win	3–1	Courtney Himes	Technical Submission (rear-naked choke)	Bush Cree Promotions: Cage Wars 15	April 6, 2013	1	2:21	Grand Junction, Colorado, United States	
Loss	2–1	Tecia Torres	Decision (unanimous)	Invicta FC 4	January 5, 2013	3	5:00	Kansas City, Kansas, United States	
Win	2–0	Amber Stautzenberger	Decision (unanimous)	Premier Fight Series 2	September 22, 2012	3	5:00	Fort Worth, Texas, United States	
Win	1–0	Jordan Nicole Gaza	Decision (split)	Ultimate Warrior Fighting: Tournament of The Warriors Finale	June 30, 2012	3	5:00	Corpus Christi, Texas, United States	Strawweight debut.

Amateur record

Amateur record breakdown		
1 match	1 win	0 losses
By submission	1	0

Res.	Record	Opponent	Method	Event	Date	Round	Time	Location	Notes
Win	1–0	Morgan Hunter	Submission (rear-naked choke)	Ultimate Reno Combat 32	April 13, 2012	1	0:50	Reno, Nevada, United States	

== Bare-knuckle boxing record ==
Professional record breakdown
2 matches	0 wins	2 losses
By decision	0	2

Res.	Record	Opponent	Method	Event	Date	Round	Time	Location	Notes
Loss	0–2	Rachael Ostovich	Decision (unanimous)	BKFC 19	July 23, 2021	5	2:00	Tampa, Florida, United States	Fight of the Night.
Loss	0–1	Britain Hart	Decision (unanimous)	BKFC Knucklemania	February 5, 2021	5	2:00	Miami, Florida, United States	Bare-knuckle boxing debut.

== Professional boxing record ==
1 fight	0 wins	0 losses
Draws	1	

No.	Result	Record	Opponent	Type	Round, time	Date	Location	Notes
1	Draw	0–0–1	Elle Brooke	SD	5	May 25, 2024	NRG Arena, Houston, Texas, US	Professional boxing debut. For MFB women's middleweight title.

== Slap fighting record ==
Professional record breakdown
3 matches	2 wins	0 losses
By decision	2	0
Draws	1	

Res.	Record	Opponent	Method	Event	Date	Round	Time	Location	Notes
Win	2–0–1	Mikael-Michelle Brown	Decision (unanimous)	Power Slap 12	March 7, 2025	3	N/A	Las Vegas, Nevada, United States	
Draw	1–0–1	Chelsea Dodson	Draw (unanimous)	Power Slap 9	October 24, 2024	3	N/A	Abu Dhabi, United Arab Emirates	
Win	1–0	Christine Wolmarans	Decision (unanimous)	Power Slap 8	June 28, 2024	3	N/A	Las Vegas, Nevada, United States	Slap fighting debut.

== See also ==
- List of female boxers
- List of female mixed martial artists
- List of mixed martial artists with professional boxing records
- List of multi-sport athletes
