= Minna Grusander =

Finnish mixed martial arts (MMA) fighter

- Born: March 22, 1989 (age 37); Salo, Finland
- Other names: Brutsku
- Nationality: Finnish
- Height: 164 cm (5 ft 5 in)
- Weight: 105 lb (48 kg; 7 st 7 lb)
- Division: Atomweight
- Style: Muay Thai, Brazilian jiu-jitsu
- Stance: Orthodox
- Fighting out of: Turku, Finland
- Team: Finnfighter's Gym
- Years active: 2015 - present

Mixed martial arts record
- Total: 11
- Wins: 6
- By knockout: 3
- By submission: 2
- By decision: 1
- Losses: 5
- By decision: 5

Other information
- Mixed martial arts record from Sherdog

Minna Grusander (born March 22, 1989) is a Finnish mixed martial artist. She previously competed for Invicta Fighting Championships. Grusander fought Jinh Yu Frey for the Invicta atomweight title.

== Mixed martial arts career ==
=== Early career ===
Grusander made her professional debut against Iman Darabi at FNF 10. She won the fight by majority decision.

Grusander was scheduled to fight Anna Kuzmenko at Battle of Botnia 2016. She won the fight by a third-round technical knockout.

Grusander was scheduled to fight the former K-1 Krush Flyweight and future Pancrase champion Syuri Kondo at Pancrase 284. Kondo won the fight by unanimous decision.

Returning to Finland, Grusander was scheduled to fight Tiia Kohtamaki at FNF 14. Grusander won the fight by a third-round technical knockout.

Grusnader was scheduled to fight Elena Belaya at FNF 15. She won the fight by a first-round rear-naked choke submission.

Grusander was scheduled to fight outside of Finaland for the second time in her professional career, being scheduled to fight Hanna Gujwan at Ladies Fight Night 8. She won the fight by a second-round rear-naked choke.

=== Invicta ===
Grusander was scheduled to make her Invicta debut against Fernanda Barros at Invicta FC 28: Mizuki vs. Jandiroba. The fight was likewise Grusander's atomweight debut. Grusander won the fight by a second-round TKO.

In her second fight with Invicta, Grusander was scheduled to challenge the reigning Invicta FC Atomweight champion Jinh Yu Frey at Invicta FC 30: Frey vs. Grusander. Frey won the fight by a highly controversial unanimous decision (49–46, 48–47, 48–47). The majority of fans scored the fight for Grusander. MMA Viking awarded the fight the 2018 "Robbery of the Year".

An immediate rematch with Jinh Yu Frey was scheduled for Invicta FC 33: Frey vs. Grusander II. Frey won the closely contested fight by split decision, with scores of 48–47, 47-48 and 48–47. The media members scored the fight for Frey.

=== Post title fights ===
After losing back-to-back title fights, Grusander returned to strawweight and was scheduled to fight Magdaléna Šormová at Oktagon 16. Šormová won the fight by unanimous decision.

Grusander faced Shauna Bannon on March 15, 2023, at Invicta FC 52: Machado vs. McCormack. She lost the fight via unanimous decision.

== Championships and accomplishments ==
- IMMAF
  - (gold) 2015 IMMAF Amateur MMA World Championships (52 kg)
- Invicta Fighting Championships
  - Performance of the Night (One time) vs. Kalyn Schwartz
- Nordic Awards
  - 2017 Female Fighter of the Year
  - 2018 Robbery of the Year vs. Jinh Yu Frey

== Mixed martial arts record ==
Professional record breakdown
11 matches	6 wins	5 losses
By knockout	3	0
By submission	2	0
By decision	1	5

Res.	Record	Opponent	Method	Event	Date	Round	Time	Location	Notes
Loss	6–5	Shauna Bannon	Decision (unanimous)	Invicta FC 52: Machado vs. McCormack	March 15, 2023	3	5:00	Denver, Colorado, United States	
Loss	6–4	Magdaléna Šormová	Decision (unanimous)	Oktagon 16	September 26, 2020	3	5:00	Brno, Czech Republic	Return to Strawweight.
Loss	6–3	Jinh Yu Frey	Decision (split)	Invicta FC 33: Frey vs. Grusander II	December 15, 2018	5	5:00	Kansas City, Missouri, United States	For the Invicta FC Atomweight Championship.
Loss	6–2	Jinh Yu Frey	Decision (unanimous)	Invicta FC 30: Frey vs. Grusander	July 21, 2018	5	5:00	Kansas City, Missouri, United States	For the vacant Invicta FC Atomweight Championship.
Win	6–1	Fernanda Barros	TKO (punches)	Invicta FC 28: Mizuki vs. Jandiroba	March 24, 2018	2	4:26	Salt Lake City, Utah, United States	Atomweight debut.
Win	5–1	Hanna Gujwan	Submission (rear-naked choke)	Ladies Fight Night 8	December 16, 2017	2	2:10	Łódź, Poland	Catchweight (110 lb) bout.
Win	4–1	Elena Belaya	Submission (rear-naked choke)	FNF 15	November 18, 2017	1	2:08	Karkkilan, Finland	Catchweight (110 lb) bout.
Win	3–1	Tiia Kohtamaki	TKO (punches)	FNF 14	May 6, 2017	3	4:02	Turku, Finland	Catchweight (110 lb) bout.
Loss	2–1	Syuri Kondo	Decision (unanimous)	Pancrase 284	February 5, 2017	3	5:00	Tokyo, Japan	
Win	2–0	Anna Kuzmenko	TKO (punches)	Battle of Botnia 2016	December 10, 2016	3	1:44	Umeå, Sweden	Strawweight debut.
Win	1–0	Iman Darabi	Decision (majority)	FNF 10	October 10, 2015	3	5:00	Turku, Finland	Catchweight (110 lb) bout.

== See also ==
- List of female mixed martial artists
