= Emily Whitmire =

American mixed martial artist

- Born: Emily Anne Whitmire; May 24, 1991 (age 35); Portland, Oregon, United States
- Other names: Spitfire
- Height: 5 ft 5 in (1.65 m)
- Weight: 115 lb (52 kg; 8 st 3 lb)
- Division: Strawweight; Flyweight
- Reach: 63 in (160 cm)
- Fighting out of: Las Vegas, Nevada, United States
- Team: Xtreme Couture (2014–2019); Syndicate MMA (2019–present)
- Years active: 2015–present

Mixed martial arts record
- Total: 9
- Wins: 4
- By submission: 1
- By decision: 3
- Losses: 5
- By submission: 5

Other information
- Mixed martial arts record from Sherdog

Emily Anne Whitmire (born May 24, 1991) is an American mixed martial artist (MMA) who currently competes in the Strawweight division of the Invicta FC. She has previously competed in the Ultimate Fighting Championship (UFC). She is also a Slap Fighter that started out in Power Slap 10.

== Background ==
The daughter of Mitch and Tiffany Whitmire, she was born in Washougal, Washington. Her father – a Washington state wrestling champion – died in a car accident when she was mere months old. Her family moved to Camas, Washington, and then to Vancouver where she graduated from Skyview High School. Emily grew up barrel racing horses, dreaming of racing in the National Finals Rodeo.

Inebriated after sneaking into a bar with a fake ID as an 18-year-old, Whitmire took a grappling match with Lisa Ellis and was inspired by the sport despite losing. After the incident, she started training in a Portland gym and taking amateur matches before being invited to train at Xtreme Couture in 2017.

== Mixed martial arts career ==
=== Early career ===
Whitmire started her professional MMA career in 2015 and amassed a record of 2–1 prior to participating in The Ultimate Fighter 26 UFC TV MMA competition series which she was subsequently signed by UFC after the show.

=== The Ultimate Fighter ===
In August 2017, it was announced that Whitmire was one of the fighters featured on The Ultimate Fighter 26, UFC TV series, where the process to crown the UFC's inaugural 125-pound women's champion will take place. In the opening round, Whitmire faced Christina Marks and she won the fight via submission in round one. In the quarterfinals, she faced Roxanne Modafferi and lost the bout via technical knockout.

=== Ultimate Fighting Championship ===
Whitmire made her UFC debut on December 1, 2017, on The Ultimate Fighter 26 Finale against Gillian Robertson. She lost the fight via submission in round one.

Her next fight came on July 7, 2018, at UFC 226 against Jamie Moyle. She won the fight via a unanimous decision.

On February 10, 2019, Whitmire faced Aleksandra Albu at UFC on ESPN 1. She won the fight via submission just one minute into the first round.

Whitmire faced promotional newcomer Amanda Ribas on June 29, 2019, at UFC on ESPN 3. She lost the fight via rear-naked choke submission in the second round.

Whitmire was scheduled to face Polyana Viana on March 7, 2020, at UFC 248. At the weigh-ins, Whitmire weighed in at 117.5 pounds, 1.5 pounds over the strawweight non-title fight limit of 116. She was fined 20% of her purse and her bout with Polyana Viana was expected to proceed as scheduled at a catchweight. Subsequently, Whitmire was hospitalized the day of the event and the fight was cancelled. The pair was rescheduled on August 29, 2020, at UFC Fight Night 175 in a flyweight bout. Whitmire lost the fight via an armbar submission in round one.

Whitmire was expected to face Hannah Cifers on February 27, 2021 at UFC Fight Night: Rozenstruik vs. Gane. However, Cifers pulled out due to undisclosed reasons and was replaced by Sam Hughes. In turn, Whitmire was removed from the bout on February 14 due to undisclosed reasons, and the bout was cancelled.

Whitmire was expected to face Cory McKenna at UFC Fight Night 192 on September 18, 2021. However, McKenna was pulled from the event for undisclosed reasons and she was replaced by Hannah Goldy. Whitmire lost the fight via an armbar in round one.

After the loss, Whitmire was announced to be no longer part of the UFC roster.

=== Invicta Fighting Championships ===
Whitmire was scheduled to face Hilarie Rose on January 12, 2022 at Invicta FC 45. The bout was scratched for unknown reasons.

=== Fury Fighting Championships ===
Whitmire was scheduled to face Celine Haga on March 27, 2022 at Fury FC 59 but the bout was postponed after Whitmire suffered an injury. The bout was rescheduled to take place at Fury FC 67 on August 14, 2022 but was cancelled once again.

== Championships and accomplishments ==
=== Mixed martial arts ===
- Ultimate Fighting Championship
  - Fastest submission in UFC Women's Strawweight division history (1:01) (vs. Aleksandra Albu)

== Mixed martial arts record ==
Professional record breakdown
9 matches	4 wins	5 losses
By submission	1	5
By decision	3	0

Res.	Record	Opponent	Method	Event	Date	Round	Time	Location	Notes
Loss	4–5	Hannah Goldy	Submission (armbar)	UFC Fight Night: Smith vs. Spann	September 18, 2021	1	4:17	Las Vegas, Nevada, United States	Flyweight bout.
Loss	4–4	Polyana Viana	Submission (armbar)	UFC Fight Night: Smith vs. Rakić	August 29, 2020	1	1:53	Las Vegas, Nevada, United States	
Loss	4–3	Amanda Ribas	Submission (rear-naked choke)	UFC on ESPN: Ngannou vs. dos Santos	June 29, 2019	2	2:10	Minneapolis, Minnesota, United States	
Win	4–2	Aleksandra Albu	Submission (rear-naked choke)	UFC on ESPN: Ngannou vs. Velasquez	February 17, 2019	1	1:01	Phoenix, Arizona, United States	
Win	3–2	Jamie Moyle	Decision (unanimous)	UFC 226	July 7, 2018	3	5:00	Las Vegas, Nevada, United States	Return to Strawweight.
Loss	2–2	Gillian Robertson	Submission (armbar)	The Ultimate Fighter: A New World Champion Finale	December 1, 2017	1	2:12	Las Vegas, Nevada, United States	Flyweight debut.
Win	2–1	Ronni Nanney	Decision (unanimous)	Extreme Beatdown: Beatdown 20	March 18, 2017	3	5:00	New Town, North Dakota, United States	
Loss	1–1	Kelly D'Angelo	Submission (guillotine choke)	RFA 44	September 30, 2016	2	3:46	St. Charles, Missouri, United States	
Win	1–0	Emily Ducote	Decision (unanimous)	Freestyle Cage Fighting 50	September 19, 2015	3	5:00	Shawnee, Oklahoma, United States	Strawweight debut.

Exhibition record breakdown		
2 matches	1 win	1 loss
By knockout	0	1
By submission	1	0

Res.	Record	Opponent	Method	Event	Date	Round	Time	Location	Notes
Loss	1–1	Roxanne Modafferi	TKO (elbows)	The Ultimate Fighter: A New World Champion	November 8, 2017 (air date)	1	4:59	Las Vegas, Nevada, United States	TUF 26 Quarter-final round
Win	1–0	Christina Marks	Verbal Submission (armbar)	The Ultimate Fighter: A New World Champion	November 1, 2017 (air date)	1	0:40	Las Vegas, Nevada, United States	TUF 26 preliminary round

== See also ==
- List of female mixed martial artists
