= Liz McCarthy (fighter) =

American mixed martial artist

- Born: May 1, 1986 (age 40); Milwaukie, Oregon, U.S.
- Height: 5 ft 2 in (1.57 m)
- Weight: 104 lb (47 kg; 7.4 st)
- Division: Atomweight

Mixed martial arts record
- Total: 6
- Wins: 2
- By knockout: 1
- By decision: 1
- Losses: 4
- By knockout: 1
- By decision: 3

Other information
- Mixed martial arts record from Sherdog

Liz McCarthy is an American mixed martial artist who competes in the Atomweight division. She is signed with Invicta FC. She competed at Invicta 2 and 4 with a win and a loss. She returned at Invicta FC 9 against Amber Brown where she lost via split decision.

== Mixed martial arts record ==
Professional record breakdown
6 matches	2 wins	4 losses
By knockout	1	1
By submission	0	0
By decision	1	3

Res.	Record	Opponent	Method	Event	Date	Round	Time	Location	Notes
Loss	2–4	Kyra Batara	TKO (punches)	Combate Americas: Road to the Championship 2	December 16, 2015	3	2:38	Hollywood, California, United States	
Loss	2–3	Jinh Yu Frey	Decision (unanimous)	Invicta FC 14: Evinger vs. Kianzad	September 12, 2015	3	5:00	Kansas City, Missouri, United States	
Loss	2–2	Amber Brown	Decision (split)	Invicta FC 9: Honchak vs. Hashi	November 1, 2014	3	5:00	Davenport, Iowa, United States	
Win	2–1	Cassie Robb	Decision (unanimous)	Intense Championship Fighting 13	May 16, 2014	3	5:00	Great Falls, Montana, United States	
Loss	1–1	Jodie Esquibel	Decision (split)	Invicta FC 4: Esparza vs. Hyatt	January 5, 2013	3	5:00	Kansas City, Kansas, United States	
Win	1–0	Jessica Phillipus	TKO (doctor stoppage)	Invicta FC 2: Baszler vs. McMann	July 28, 2012	1	5:00	Kansas City, Kansas, United States	
