= Aleksandra Albu =

Moldovan mixed martial arts fighter

- Born: Aleksandra Albu; 14 July 1990 (age 36); Vulcănești, Moldavian SSR, USSR
- Other names: Stitch
- Nationality: Russian; Moldovan
- Height: 5 ft 3 in (1.60 m)
- Weight: 115 lb (52 kg; 8.2 st)
- Division: Strawweight
- Reach: 62 in (157 cm)
- Style: Judo, Karate
- Fighting out of: Moscow, Russia
- Team: MMA–KEGI
- Trainer: Andrey Tsarkov
- Rank: Black Belt in karate

Mixed martial arts record
- Total: 5
- Wins: 3
- By knockout: 1
- By submission: 1
- By decision: 1
- Losses: 2
- By submission: 1
- By decision: 1

Other information
- Mixed martial arts record from Sherdog

Aleksandra Albu (Russian: Александра Албу, also transliterated Alexandra; born 14 July 1990) is a Moldovan-born Russian mixed martial artist. Albu previously competed in the Ultimate Fighting Championship’s strawweight division.

== Mixed martial arts career ==
=== Early career ===
Alexandra Albu has competed in karate, crossfit, and bodybuilding competitions.

=== Ultimate Fighting Championship ===
Albu was expected to make her promotional debut against Julie Kedzie at UFC Fight Night 33 on 6 December 2013. However, Albu was forced to pull out of the bout due to a knee injury.

Albu made her eventual debut on 11 April 2015 at UFC Fight Night 64 against Izabela Badurek. Albu defeated Badurek in the second round with a guillotine choke.

In July 2017 after a two-year hiatus, Albu returned to UFC with a match against American fighter Kailin Curran. Albu won by unanimous decision.

Albu faced Emily Whitmire on 17 February 2019 at UFC on ESPN 1. She lost the fight via submission in the first round.

Albu faced promotional newcomer Loma Lookboonmee on 26 October 2019 at UFC on ESPN+ 20. She lost the fight via split decision.

In February 2021, it was reported that Albu and UFC had parted ways.

== Personal life ==
Albu is currently a student at the Academy of Intellectual Property. Her nickname, Stitch, comes from the fictional character Stitch from the movie Lilo & Stitch.

She officially represents Russia after several years of living and training in Moscow.

== Mixed martial arts record ==
Professional record breakdown
5 matches	3 wins	2 losses
By knockout	1	0
By submission	1	1
By decision	1	1

Res.	Record	Opponent	Method	Event	Date	Round	Time	Location	Notes
Loss	3–2	Loma Lookboonmee	Decision (split)	UFC Fight Night: Maia vs. Askren	26 October 2019	3	5:00	Kallang, Singapore	
Loss	3–1	Emily Whitmire	Submission (rear-naked choke)	UFC on ESPN: Ngannou vs. Velasquez	17 February 2019	1	1:01	Phoenix, Arizona, United States	
Win	3–0	Kailin Curran	Decision (unanimous)	UFC 214	29 July 2017	3	5:00	Anaheim, California, United States	
Win	2–0	Izabela Badurek	Submission (guillotine choke)	UFC Fight Night: Gonzaga vs. Cro Cop 2	11 April 2015	2	3:34	Kraków, Poland	Strawweight debut.
Win	1–0	Lyubov Demidova	TKO (punches)	Octagon Fight Club	29 June 2013	1	3:13	Moscow, Russia	Bantamweight debut.
