= List of current Invicta FC fighters =

The Invicta Fighting Championship also known as Invicta FC, is an American mixed martial arts (MMA) organization for female fighters. It was founded in 2012 by Janet Martin and Shannon Knapp.

Each fight record has four categories: wins, losses, draws, and no-contests (NC). All fight records in this article are displayed in that order, with fights resulting in a no-contest listed in parentheses.

== Featherweights (145 lb, 65 kg) ==
(Note: Invicta FC championship title holders are marked with a (C).) (Note: The flags listed in these tables are in accordance with official Invicta FC telecasts and may not fully or accurately represent the full citizenship of the peoples listed.)

ISO	Name	Age	Ht.	Nickname	Result / next fight / status	Ref	Months since Last Bout	Invicta FC record	MMA record
(Germany)	Julia Dorny	36	5 ft 9 in (1.75 m)		Loss - Invicta FC 60 - Joy Pendell		19	0–2	2–3
(Mexico)	Abigail Montes	26	5 ft 4 in (1.63 m)	Brave	Loss - Invicta FC 57 - Jamie Edenden		23	0–1	4–4
(Brazil)	Marilia Morias	37	5 ft 7 in (1.70 m)	The Tigress	Loss - Invicta FC 61 - Joy Pendell		17	0–1	3–3
(Brazil)	Kelly Ottoni	41	5 ft 7 in (1.70 m)		Loss - Invicta FC 56 - Jackie Cataline		25	0–1	5–1
(United States)	Riley Martinez	N/A	5 ft 9 in (1.75 m)	Rad	Loss - Invicta FC 61 - Jaeleen Robledo		17	1–1	4–1
(United States)	Jackie Cataline	38	5 ft 6 in (1.68 m)	The Hybrid	Loss - Invicta FC 61 - Jamie Edenden		17	1–1	5–4
(United States)	Joy Pendell	36	5 ft 11 in (1.80 m)	Killjoy	Win - Invicta FC 61 - Marilia Morais		17	2–1	5–2
(United States)	Jaeleen Robledo	22	5 ft 9 in (1.75 m)	The Natural	Win - Invicta FC 61 - Riley Martinez		17	1–0	4–1
(Australia)	Jamie Edenden	N/A	5 ft 7 in (1.70 m)	Snickers	Win - Invicta FC 61 - Jackie Cataline		17	2–0	6–2–1

== Bantamweights (135 lb, 61 kg) ==
ISO	Name	Age	Ht.	Nickname	Result / next fight / status	Ref	Months since Last Bout	Invicta FC record	MMA record
(Brazil)	Talita Bernardo	39	5 ft 4 in (1.63 m)		Loss - Invicta FC 59 - Jennifer Maia		20	4–1	11–5
(Brazil)	Jennifer Maia (C)	37	5 ft 4 in (1.63 m)		Win - Invicta FC 59 - Talita Bernardo		20	6–2	23–10–1
(United States)	Taneisha Tennant	37	5 ft 7 in (1.70 m)	Triple Threat	Loss - Invicta FC 51 - Talita Bernardo		43	4–1	5–2
(Germany)	Katharina Lehner	36	5 ft 6 in (1.68 m)	The German Gypsy	Loss - Invicta FC 62 - Olga Rubin		15	2–4	9–6
(Israel)	Olga Rubin	37	5 ft 9 in (1.75 m)	Big Bad	Win - Invicta FC 62 - Katharina Lehner		15	3–2	10–5
(Canada)	Maria Djukic	32	5 ft 7 in (1.70 m)	Sweet	Win - Invicta FC 57 - Maria Favela		23	2–1	4–1
(Brazil)	Mayra Cantuária	37	5 ft 7 in (1.70 m)		Win - Invicta FC 60 - Olga Rubin		19	1–1	11–6–1 (1)
(United States)	Claire Guthrie	30	5 ft 6 in (1.68 m)	Grizzly	Loss - Invicta FC 53 - Olga Rubin		40	4–2	5–3
(Mexico)	Maria Jose Favela	33	5 ft 7 in (1.70 m)	Majo Leona	Loss - Invicta FC 57 - Maria Djukic		23	0–3	3–3
(Brazil)	Taynara Silva	31	5 ft 3 in (1.60 m)	N/A	Win - Invicta FC 57 - Claire Lopez		17	1–0	8–5
(United States)	Taylor Guardado	35	5 ft 6 in (1.68 m)	No Mercy	Win - Invicta FC 55 - Yoko Higashi		26	1–1	5–2

== Flyweights (125 lb, 56 kg) ==
ISO	Name	Age	Ht.	Nickname	Result / next fight / status	Ref	Months since Last Bout	Invicta FC record	MMA record
(Brazil)	Liana Pirosin	33	5 ft 5 in (1.65 m)	Li	Loss - Invicta FC 53 - Elise Pone		40	1–4	8–6
(United States)	Elise Pone	41	5 ft 8 in (1.73 m)	Piece	Win - Invicta FC 53 - Liana Pirosin		40	3–1	3–1
(United States)	Kristina Williams	37	5 ft 8 in (1.73 m)	Warhorse	Win - Invicta FC 57 - Nayara Maia		23	4–1	8–4
(Brazil)	Poliana Botelho	37	5 ft 8 in (1.73 m)	N/A	Win - Invicta FC 49 - Helen Peralta		47	1–0	9–5
(United States)	DeAnna Bennett	41	5 ft 4 in (1.63 m)	Vitamin D	Loss - Invicta FC 62 - Rayla Nascimento		15	7–6	14–10–1
(United States)	Victoria Leonardo	36	5 ft 5 in (1.65 m)	Fury	Loss - Invicta FC 60 - Rayla Nascimento		19	4–3	10–7
(Russia)	Milana Dudieva	37	5 ft 5 in (1.65 m)	N/A	Win - Invicta FC 62 - Amanda Torres		15	3–4	14–9
(Poland)	Barbara Grabowska	N/A	5 ft 3 in (1.60 m)	N/A	Loss - Invicta FC 58 - Zoe Nowicki		22	0–1	0–1
(Peru)	Sandra Lavado	32	5 ft 6 in (1.68 m)	Peruvian Zombie	Loss - Invicta FC 57 - Milana Dudieva		23	0–1	12–6
(Brazil)	Nayara Maia	36	5 ft 5 in (1.65 m)	Capita	Loss - Invicta FC 57 - Kristina Williams		23	0–1	7–2
(United States)	Liz Tracy	38	5 ft 2 in (1.57 m)	The Titan	Loss - Invicta FC 57 - DeAnna Bennett		23	3–6	7–6
(Brazil)	Thaiane Souza	33	5 ft 2 in (1.57 m)	Pancadão	Loss - Invicta FC 61 - Emily Ducote		17	0–1	9–8 (1)
(United States)	Kellie Marin	41	5 ft 7 in (1.70 m)	The Fight Squirrel	Loss - Invicta FC 61 - Zoe Nowicki		17	0–1	1–1
(United States)	Kate Bacik	33	5 ft 7 in (1.70 m)	Queen of the South	Win - Invicta FC 56 - Paula Bittencourt		25	1–0	6–2
(United States)	Hilarie Rose	33	5 ft 3 in (1.60 m)	N/A	Loss - Invicta FC 54 - Andrea Amara		34	0–1	9–7
(United States)	Fallon Johnson	29	5 ft 8 in (1.73 m)	The Ice Queen	Loss - Invicta FC 55 - Violeta Mendoza		26	0–1	0–1
(Mexico)	Violeta Mendoza	40	5 ft 6 in (1.68 m)	Violencia	Win - Invicta FC 55 - Fallon Johnson		26	1–0	2–0
(Brazil)	Josiane Oliveira	N/A	5 ft 4 in (1.63 m)	N/A	Loss - Invicta FC 55 - Zoe Nowicki		26	0–1	0–1
(Brazil)	Amanda Torres	34	5 ft 2 in (1.57 m)	Sardinha	Loss - Invicta FC 62 - Milana Dudieva		15	0–2	9–9
(Brazil)	Rayla Nascimento	30	5 ft 2 in (1.57 m)	Índia	Win - Invicta FC 62 - DeAnna Bennett		15	2–0	12–10
(United States)	Zoe Nowicki	26	5 ft 1 in (1.55 m)	N/A	Win - Invicta FC 61 - Kellie Marin		17	3–0	3–0
(United States)	Ky Bennett	28	5 ft 3 in (1.60 m)	Kobra	Win - Invicta FC 53 - Kendal Holowell		40	1–0	3–3
(United States)	Alexandra Lawal	28	5 ft 5 in (1.65 m)	N/A	Loss - Invicta FC 62 - Charlsey Maner		15	0–1	0–1
(United States)	Charlsey Maner	28	5 ft 4 in (1.63 m)	N/A	Win - Invicta FC 62 - Alexandra Lawal		15	1–0	1–0

== Strawweights (115 lb, 52 kg) ==
ISO	Name	Age	Ht.	Nickname	Result / next fight / status	Ref	Months since Last Bout	Invicta FC record	MMA record
(Brazil)	Valesca Machado	31	5 ft 4 in (1.63 m)	Tina Black	Win - Invicta FC 59 - Yasmin Castanho		20	5–1	15–4 (1)
(Colombia)	Sayury Cañon	32	5 ft 1 in (1.55 m)	N/A	Win - Invicta FC 58 - Abril Anguiano		22	2–1	5–1
(Russia)	Yulia Ostroverkhova	37	5 ft 4 in (1.63 m)	N/A	Loss - Invicta FC 58 - Emily Ducote		22	0–2	9–4–1
(United States)	Emily Ducote	32	5 ft 2 in (1.57 m)	Gordinha	Win - Invicta FC 61 - Thaiane Souza		17	6–1	15–9
(United States)	Ashley Yoder	38	5 ft 7 in (1.70 m)	Spider Monkey	Win - Invicta FC 20 - Amber Brown		117	1–0	9–10
(United States)	Kay Hansen	27	5 ft 3 in (1.60 m)	N/A	Win - Invicta FC 55 - Sayury Cañon		26	5–3	8–6
(United States)	Alesha Zappitella	31	4 ft 11 in (1.50 m)	Half Pint	Loss - Invicta FC 47 - Emily Ducote		51	6–3	9–4 (1)
(Mexico)	Nicole Geraldo	27	5 ft 3 in (1.60 m)	Nico	Loss - Invicta FC 53 - Monique Adriane		40	0–1	6–1
(United States)	Meaghan Penning	30	5 ft 1 in (1.55 m)	N/A	Loss - Invicta FC 57 - Fernanda Orellana		23	1–1	3–2
(United States)	Laura Gallardo	N/A	5 ft 1 in (1.55 m)	La Jefa	Loss - Invicta FC 51 - Fatima Kline		43	0–2	4–3
(Brazil)	Ediana Silva	24	4 ft 11 in (1.50 m)	Mel Pitbull	Loss - Invicta FC 52 - Karolina Wójcik		53	0–2	14–4
(Brazil)	Hérica Tibúrcio	33	4 ft 11 in (1.50 m)	N/A	Loss - Invicta FC 42 - Jéssica Delboni		71	3–3	11–5
(Chile)	Fernanda Orellana	23	5 ft 2 in (1.57 m)	N/A	Win - Invicta FC 59 - Ashley Barrett		20	2–0	3–0
(United States)	Hope Holmes	36	4 ft 11 in (1.50 m)	Hummingbird	Loss - Invicta FC 60 - Giulliany Perêa		19	0–2	2–2
(United States)	Kendal Holowell	N/A	5 ft 4 in (1.63 m)	The Crocodile	Loss - Invicta FC 53 - Ky Bennett		40	0–2	2–4
(United States)	Jennifer Chieng	40	5 ft 3 in (1.60 m)	Dugwen	Loss - Invicta FC 47 - Alyssa Linduska		51	0–2	1–2
(United States)	Anna Somers	33	5 ft 4 in (1.63 m)	Hon'KNEE' Badger	Loss - Invicta FC 60 - Amber Medina		19	0–1	2–3
(United States)	Quinn Williams	27	5 ft 2 in (1.57 m)	N/A	Loss - Invicta FC 62 - Ashley Barrett		15	1–1	2–2
(United States)	Ashley Barrett	25	5 ft 2 in (1.57 m)	SMASHLEY	Win - Invicta FC 62 - Quinn Williams		15	2–1	2–1
(Brazil)	Yasmin Castanho	29	5 ft 5 in (1.65 m)	Monstrinha	Loss - Invicta FC 59 - Valesca Machado		20	0–1	6–2
(United States)	Amber Medina	34	5 ft 4 in (1.63 m)	Vicious	Win - Invicta FC 60 - Anna Somers		19	1–0	1–0
(United States)	Alyssa Linduska	33	5 ft 4 in (1.63 m)	Lightning	Win - Invicta FC 47 - Jennifer Chieng		51	1–0	1–0
(United States)	Abril Anguiano	27	5 ft 4 in (1.63 m)	Mulan	Loss - Invicta FC 58 - Sayury Canon		22	0–1	6–5 (1)

== Atomweights (105 lb, 48 kg) ==
ISO	Name	Age	Ht.	Nickname	Result / next fight / status	Ref	Months since Last Bout	Invicta FC record	MMA record
(United States)	Jillian DeCoursey	42	5 ft 2 in (1.57 m)	Lionheart	Loss - Invicta FC 53 - Rayanne dos Santos		40	5–3	6–4
(Brazil)	Monique Adriane	35	5 ft 3 in (1.60 m)		Loss - Invicta FC 59 - Ana Palacios		20	2–2	6–3
(United States)	Marisa Messer-Belenchia	32	5 ft 0 in (1.52 m)	Spider Monkey	Loss - Invicta FC 51 - Elisandra Ferreira		43	1–2	5–2
(Brazil)	Elisandra Ferreira (C)	28	5 ft 1 in (1.55 m)	Lili	Win - Invicta FC 61 - Ana Palacios		17	5–0	9–2
(Mexico)	Nicole Geraldo	27	5 ft 3 in (1.60 m)	Nico	Loss - Invicta FC 53 - Monique Adriane		40	0–1	6–1
(Mexico)	Flor Hernandez	N/A	5 ft 2 in (1.57 m)	Compean	Loss - Invicta FC 56 - Ana Palacios		25	0–2	4–2
(Mexico)	Ailed Zubieta	31	5 ft 0 in (1.52 m)	N/A	Loss - Invicta FC 56 - Giulliany Perêa		25	0–1	3–4
(Mexico)	Ana Palacios	28	5 ft 0 in (1.52 m)	Guerrera	Loss - Invicta FC 61 - Elisandra Ferreira		17	2–1	10–4–1
(Brazil)	Andressa Romero	32	5 ft 2 in (1.57 m)	Gauchinha	Loss - Invicta FC 57 - Elisandra Ferreira		23	1–1	7–5–1
(France)	Claire Lopez	37	5 ft 2 in (1.57 m)	N/A	Loss - Invicta FC 61 - Taynara Silva		17	0–1	8–7
(Brazil)	Giulliany Perêa	N/A	5 ft 3 in (1.60 m)	Giu	Win - Invicta FC 60 - Hope Holmes		19	1–0	3–0
(Canada)	Katie Saull	39	5 ft 4 in (1.63 m)	Queen of the North	Loss - Invicta FC 55 - Elisandra Ferreira		26	1–4	6–7
(United States)	Linda Mihalec	44	5 ft 3 in (1.60 m)	F109	Loss - Invicta FC 39 - Jillian DeCoursey		79	1–1	2–1
(Poland)	Magdalena Czaban	27	5 ft 1 in (1.55 m)	Atomowka	Win - Invicta FC 58 - Hope Holmes		22	1–0	2–0
(Japan)	Saori Oshima	31	4 ft 11 in (1.50 m)	Little Giant	Loss - Invicta FC 55 - Andressa Romero		26	0–1	14–6
(Japan)	Shino VanHoose	31	5 ft 4 in (1.63 m)	N/A	Loss - Invicta FC 60 - Liana Ferreira Pirosin		19	1–3	6–7

== See also ==
- Invicta Champions
- Invicta FC events
- List of current UFC fighters
- List of current ACA fighters
- List of current Brave CF fighters
- List of current KSW fighters
- List of current ONE fighters
- List of current PFL fighters
- List of current Rizin FF fighters
- List of current Road FC fighters
