= Ducote =

Ducote is a French surname derived from "côte" meaning "coast" or "slop." The name refer to someone who lived near coastal region or hillside. Notable people with the surname include:

- Emily Ducote (born 1994), American mixed martial artist
- Moon Ducote (1897–1937), American baseball, football, and basketball coach, football and baseball player, football official, and businessman
