= Amber Brown (fighter) =

American mixed martial arts (MMA) fighter

- Born: December 14, 1988 (age 37); America
- Other names: The Bully
- Height: 5 ft 4 in (1.63 m)
- Weight: 105 lb (48 kg; 7.5 st)
- Division: Atomweight
- Reach: 65 in (165 cm)
- Stance: Southpaw
- Fighting out of: Albuquerque, New Mexico
- Team: Fit NHB
- Years active: 2012 - present

Mixed martial arts record
- Total: 13
- Wins: 7
- By knockout: 1
- By submission: 4
- By decision: 2
- Losses: 6
- By submission: 3
- By decision: 3

Other information
- Mixed martial arts record from Sherdog

Amber Brown (born December 14, 1988) is an American mixed martial arts (MMA) fighter in the Atomweight weight class.

Fight Matrix has almost continually ranked Brown as a top fifteen women's atomweight, having ranked her as high as #5 in October 2015.

== Mixed martial arts career ==
=== Early career ===
Brown made her professional debut against Ashley Aguirre at KOTC Final Countdown. She won the fight by a unanimous decision. Brown won her second fight with KOTC as well, beating Abby Higginbotham by a first-round TKO at KOTC Curtain Call.

Brown was scheduled to fight Emi Fujino at Pancrase 247, as a late replacement for Monica Lovato, who had to withdraw following a car accident. Fujino won the fight by a second-round neck crank submission.

Brown was scheduled to fight Kikuyo Ishikawa at Pancrase 250. Brown won the fight by a third-round armbar submission.

=== Invicta ===
For her Invicta debut, Brown was scheduled to fight Liz McCarthy at Invicta FC 9: Honchak vs. Hashi. She won the fight by split decision.

Brown was scheduled to fight Catherine Costigan at Invicta FC 13: Cyborg vs. Van Duin. She won the fight by a first round submission.

Brown was scheduled to fight Shino VanHoose at Invicta FC 15: Cyborg vs. Ibragimova. Brown won the fight by a first-round guillotine choke.

Her three fight winning streak earned Brown the chance to challenge the reigning Invicta Atomweight champion Ayaka Hamasaki, at Invicta FC 16: Hamasaki vs. Brown. Hamasaki won the fight by a third-round armbar submission.

Brown was next scheduled to fight Ashley Yoder at Invicta FC 20: Evinger vs. Kunitskaya. Brown lost the fight by a second round submission. Brown was scheduled to fight Ashley Cummins at Invicta FC 22: Evinger vs. Kunitskaya II. Cummins won the fight by unanimous decision, extending Brown's losing streak to three fights.

Brown snapped her losing streak at Invicta FC 26: Maia vs. Niedzwiedz, submitting Tessa Simpson with an armbar, 50 seconds into the fight.

Brown was scheduled to fight Alesha Zappitella at Invicta FC 33: Frey vs. Grusander II. Zappitella won the fight by unanimous decision.

Brown participated in the Invicta Phoenix Series 1 strawweight tournament. She was scheduled to face Sharon Jacobson in the quarterfinals, as a late replacement for Mizuki Inoue, who was pulled from the card due to weigh-cut complications. Jacobson won the fight by unanimous decision.

Brown was scheduled to fight a rematch with Sharon Jacobson at Invicta FC: Phoenix Series 3. Brown later withdrew from the bout for undisclosed reasons.

=== Post Invicta ===
After three years away from MMA, Brown was scheduled to make her return and debut for LFA against Pauline Macias in July 2022. Brown withdrew from the fight after her daughter became ill.

Brown was scheduled to fight veteran Celine Haga on March 11, 2023, for Fight World MMA. However the day before the event, Haga withdrew due to illness and the bout was cancelled.

Brown made her debut in LFA against Marnic Mann at LFA 157 on April 21, 2023, with Brown losing the fight via unanimous decision.

== Championships and accomplishments ==
- Awakening Fighters
  - 2015 Fan Favourite Atomweight of the Year

== Mixed martial arts record ==
Professional record breakdown
14 matches	7 wins	7 losses
By knockout	1	0
By submission	4	3
By decision	2	4
No contests	0	

Res.	Record	Opponent	Method	Event	Date	Round	Time	Location	Notes
Loss	7–7	Marnic Mann	Decision (unanimous)	LFA 157	April 21, 2023	3	5:00	Prior Lake, Minnesota, United States	
Loss	7–6	Sharon Jacobson	Decision (unanimous)	Invicta Phoenix Series 1	May 3, 2019	1	5:00	Kansas City, Kansas	Invicta FC Strawweight Tournament Quarterfinal.
Loss	7–5	Alesha Zappitella	Decision (unanimous)	Invicta FC 33: Frey vs. Grusander II	December 15, 2018	3	5:00	Kansas City, Missouri, United States	
Win	7–4	Tessa Simpson	Submission (armbar)	Invicta FC 26: Maia vs. Niedzwiedz	December 8, 2017	1	0:50	Kansas City, Missouri, United States	
Loss	6–4	Ashley Cummins	Decision (unanimous)	Invicta FC 22: Evinger vs. Kunitskaya II	March 25, 2017	3	5:00	Kansas City, Missouri, United States	
Loss	6–3	Ashley Yoder	Submission (armbar)	Invicta FC 20: Evinger vs. Kunitskaya	November 18, 2016	2	2:31	Kansas City, Missouri, United States	
Loss	6–2	Ayaka Hamasaki	Submission (armbar)	Invicta FC 16: Hamasaki vs. Brown	March 11, 2016	3	2:52	Las Vegas, Nevada, United States	For the Invicta FC Atomweight Championship.
Win	6–1	Shino VanHoose	Submission (guillotine choke)	Invicta FC 15: Cyborg vs. Ibragimova	January 16, 2016	1	2:36	Costa Mesa, California, United States	
Win	5–1	Catherine Costigan	Submission (rear-naked choke)	Invicta FC 13: Cyborg vs. Van Duin	July 9, 2015	1	3:34	Las Vegas, Nevada, United States	
Win	4–1	Liz McCarthy	Decision (split)	Invicta FC 9: Honchak vs. Hashi	November 1, 2014	3	5:00	Davenport, Iowa, United States	
Win	3–1	Kikuyo Ishikawa	Submission (armbar)	Pancrase 250	July 28, 2013	3	3:27	Tokyo, Japan	
Loss	2–1	Emi Fujino	Submission (neck crank)	Pancrase 247	May 19, 2013	2	4:18	Tokyo, Japan	
Win	2–0	Abby Higginbotham	TKO (punches)	KOTC Curtain Call	January 26, 2013	1	2:24	Norman, Oklahoma, United States	
Win	1–0	Ashley Aguirre	Decision (unanimous)	KOTC Final Countdown	November 12, 2012	3	5:00	Santa Fe, New Mexico, United States	

== See also ==
- List of female mixed martial artists
- List of current Invicta FC fighters
