= Denise Gomes =

Brazilian mixed martial artist

- Born: Denise Pacheco Gomes; December 30, 1999 (age 26); São Leopoldo, Rio Grande do Sul, Brazil
- Height: 5 ft 2 in (1.57 m)
- Weight: 115 lb (52 kg; 8 st 3 lb)
- Division: Strawweight
- Fighting out of: Las Vegas, Nevada, U.S.
- Team: Paraná Vale Tudo
- Years active: 2017–present

Mixed martial arts record
- Total: 16
- Wins: 13
- By knockout: 8
- By decision: 5
- Losses: 3
- By knockout: 1
- By decision: 2

Other information
- Mixed martial arts record from Sherdog

Denise Pacheco Gomes (born December 30, 1999) is a Brazilian mixed martial artist currently fighting in the women's Strawweight division of the Ultimate Fighting Championship (UFC). As of October 3, 2026, she is #4 in the Meta UFC women's strawweight rankings and as of November 17, 2026, she is #15 in the UFC women's pound-for-pound rankings.

== Mixed martial arts career ==
=== Early career ===
Gomes started her professional MMA career in 2017 and mainly fought in Brazil. She amassed a record of 4–1 prior to being signed by Invicta.

Gomes faced Milana Dudieva at Invicta FC 46 on March 9, 2022. She won the bout in the third round by way of technical knockout by knees and punches.

Gomes faced Rayanne Amanda at Dana White's Contender Series 51 on August 23, 2022. She won the fight via unanimous decision, earning her a UFC contract in the process.

=== Ultimate Fighting Championship ===
Gomes faced Loma Lookboonmee on September 17, 2022, at UFC Fight Night 210. She replaced Diana Belbiţă who was originally scheduled to face Lookboonmee. Gomes lost the fight via unanimous decision.

Gomes was scheduled to face Bruna Brasil on April 15, 2023, at UFC on ESPN 44. Gomes won the bout by technical knockout.

Gomes faced Yazmin Jauregui at UFC 290 on July 8, 2023. She won the fight by a first-round technical knockout, earning her a Performance of the Night award.

Gomes faced Angela Hill at UFC Fight Night 231 on November 4, 2023. She lost the fight via unanimous decision.

Gomes faced Eduarda Moura on June 8, 2024, at UFC on ESPN 57. At the weigh-ins, Moura weighed in at 116.5 pounds, half a pound over the strawweight non-title fight limit. The bout proceeded at catchweight and Moura was fined 20 percent of her purse which went to Gomes. She won the fight by split decision.

Gomes faced former KSW Flyweight Champion Karolina Kowalkiewicz on November 9, 2024, at UFC Fight Night 247. She won the fight by unanimous decision.

Gomes faced former Cage Fury FC Strawweight Champion Elise Reed on May 17, 2025 at UFC Fight Night 256. She won the fight by technical knockout in the second round. This fight earned her another Performance of the Night award.

Gomes faced Tecia Pennington on November 8, 2025 at UFC Fight Night 264. She won the fight by unanimous decision.

Gomes was scheduled to face Amanda Lemos on August 8, 2026 at UFC Fight Night 284. However, for undisclosed reasons, Gomes was replaced by Alexia Thainara.

Gomes faced Yan Xiaonan on August 30, 2026, at UFC Fight Night 286. She won the fight by knockout at the end of the first round.

== Professional grappling career ==
Gomes was scheduled to face Giovanna Canuto at UFC Fight Pass Invitational 6 on March 3, 2024.

== Championships and accomplishments ==
- Ultimate Fighting Championship
  - Performance of the Night (Two times) vs. Yazmin Jauregui and Elise Reed
  - Tied (Jéssica Andrade) for most knockouts in UFC Women's Strawweight division history (4)
- MMA Fighting
  - 2023 Third Team MMA All-Star

== Mixed martial arts record ==
Professional record breakdown
16 matches	13 wins	3 losses
By knockout	8	1
By decision	5	2

Res.	Record	Opponent	Method	Event	Date	Round	Time	Location	Notes
Win	13–3	Yan Xiaonan	KO (elbow and punches)	UFC Fight Night: Nurmagomedov vs. Song	August 29, 2026	1	4:49	Shanghai, China	
Win	12–3	Tecia Pennington	Decision (unanimous)	UFC Fight Night: Bonfim vs. Brown	November 8, 2025	3	5:00	Las Vegas, Nevada, United States	
Win	11–3	Elise Reed	TKO (punches)	UFC Fight Night: Burns vs. Morales	May 17, 2025	2	0:30	Las Vegas, Nevada, United States	Performance of the Night.
Win	10–3	Karolina Kowalkiewicz	Decision (unanimous)	UFC Fight Night: Magny vs. Prates	November 9, 2024	3	5:00	Las Vegas, Nevada, United States	
Win	9–3	Eduarda Moura	Decision (split)	UFC on ESPN: Cannonier vs. Imavov	June 8, 2024	3	5:00	Louisville, Kentucky, United States	Catchweight (116.5 lb) bout; Moura missed weight.
Loss	8–3	Angela Hill	Decision (unanimous)	UFC Fight Night: Almeida vs. Lewis	November 4, 2023	3	5:00	São Paulo, Brazil	
Win	8–2	Yazmin Jauregui	TKO (punches)	UFC 290	July 8, 2023	1	0:20	Las Vegas, Nevada, United States	Performance of the Night.
Win	7–2	Bruna Brasil	TKO (punches)	UFC on ESPN: Holloway vs. Allen	April 15, 2023	2	2:42	Kansas City, Missouri, United States	
Loss	6–2	Loma Lookboonmee	Decision (unanimous)	UFC Fight Night: Sandhagen vs. Song	September 17, 2022	3	5:00	Las Vegas, Nevada, United States	
Win	6–1	Rayanne dos Santos	Decision (unanimous)	Dana White's Contender Series 51	August 27, 2022	3	5:00	Las Vegas, Nevada, United States	Return to Strawweight.
Win	5–1	Milana Dudieva	TKO (knees and punches)	Invicta FC 46	March 9, 2022	3	1:56	Kansas City, Kansas, United States	
Win	4–1	Jeanne Ruas	TKO (punches)	Standout Fighting Tournament 31	October 30, 2021	3	1:03	São Paulo, Brazil	Return to Flyweight.
Win	3–1	Andressa Romero	Decision (unanimous)	Standout Fighting Tournament 28	August 5, 2021	3	5:00	São Paulo, Brazil	Strawweight debut.
Win	2–1	Andreyna Raquel	KO (punches)	Arena Global 12	June 5, 2021	2	2:19	Rio de Janeiro, Brazil	
Win	1–1	Juliana Nascimento	TKO (punches)	O Rei da Luta 3	March 13, 2021	1	1:44	Rio de Janeiro, Brazil	Flyweight debut.
Loss	0–1	Gisele Moreira	TKO (punches)	Aspera FC 57	September 9, 2017	2	3:49	Florianópolis, Brazil	Bantamweight debut.

== See also ==
- List of current UFC fighters
- List of Dana White's Contender Series alumni
- List of female mixed martial artists
