= UFC on ESPN: Gamrot vs. Klein =

Mixed martial arts event in 2025

- The poster for UFC on ESPN: Gamrot vs. Klein
- Promotion: Ultimate Fighting Championship
- Date: May 31, 2025
- Venue: UFC Apex
- City: Enterprise, Nevada, United States
- Attendance: Not announced

Event chronology
UFC Fight Night: Burns vs. Morales	UFC on ESPN: Gamrot vs. Klein	UFC 316: Dvalishvili vs. O'Malley 2

UFC on ESPN: Gamrot vs. Klein (also known as UFC on ESPN 68 and UFC Vegas 107) was a mixed martial arts event produced by the Ultimate Fighting Championship that took place on May 31, 2025, at the UFC Apex in Enterprise, Nevada, part of the Las Vegas Valley, United States.

== Background ==
A women's flyweight bout between Erin Blanchfield and Maycee Barber was originally scheduled to headline the event. They were previously expected to meet at UFC 269 in December 2021, but Barber withdrew due to undisclosed reasons. At the weigh-ins, Barber weighed in at 126.5 pounds, half a pound over the women's flyweight non-title fight limit. The bout was then expected to take place at catchweight and Barber was fined 20 percent of her purse which was supposed to go to Blanchfield. In turn, minutes before their walkouts were to take place, Barber had to withdraw due to a medical issue involving a seizure. Therefore, a lightweight bout between former KSW Featherweight and Lightweight Champion Mateusz Gamrot and Ľudovít Klein inadvertently headlined the event.

A flyweight bout between Allan Nascimento and Jafel Filho took place at this event. The pairing was originally scheduled for UFC on ESPN: Tybura vs. Spivac 2 in August 2024 but was cancelled as a result of Nascimento being ill. At the weigh-ins, Nascimento weighed in at 127.5 pounds, one and a half pounds over the flyweight non-title fight limit. The bout proceeded at catchweight and Nascimento was fined 20 percent of his purse which went to Filho.

A women's strawweight bout between former Invicta FC Atomweight Champion Rayanne dos Santos and Alice Ardelean took place for this event. They were originally scheduled to compete at UFC Fight Night: Hernandez vs. Pereira in October 2024, but dos Santos withdrew from the bout due to a broken arm.

A women's featherweight bout between Ketlen Vieira and The Ultimate Fighter: Heavy Hitters featherweight winner Macy Chiasson took place at this event. The bout was originally scheduled to be a bantamweight bout but on the day of the weigh-ins, it was announced that it would be changed to featherweight due to "weight management issues" from Vieira, who in turn forfeited 25% of her purse. The pair was originally scheduled for UFC Fight Night: Ankalaev vs. Walker 2 in January 2024, but Vieira was pulled as a result of an injury and the bout was scrapped. They were later expected to meet at UFC Fight Night: Cejudo vs. Song in February, but due to an injury suffered by Chiasson, the bout was removed from the card.

A welterweight bout between Jeremiah Wells and promotional newcomer Andreas Gustafsson was scheduled for the event. However on May 20, Wells withdrew due to an injury and was replaced by Trevin Giles in a 180 pound catchweight bout. In turn, during the weigh-ins, the UFC announced that the pairing was canceled due to Giles suffering a head injury after falling in his bathroom, so Gustafsson was booked for the following week at UFC 316 with a new opponent.

Two welterweight bouts were scheduled for this event: Ramiz Brahimaj vs. Oban Elliott and Billy Ray Goff vs. promotional newcomer Ko Seok-hyun However, Elliott and Ko were forced to withdraw due to visa issues, so Brahimaj will instead face Goff. In turn, Elliott and Ko were booked to face each other three weeks later at UFC on ABC: Hill vs. Rountree Jr..

A lightweight bout between MarQuel Mederos and Bolaji Oki was scheduled for this event. However, three days before the event, Mederos withdrew from the fight due to illness and was replaced by promotional newcomer Michael Aswell.

== Results ==
Main card (ESPN / ESPN+)
Weight class				Method	Round	Time	Notes
Lightweight	Mateusz Gamrot	def.	Ľudovít Klein	Decision (unanimous) (30–27, 30–27, 30–27)	3	5:00
Welterweight	Ramiz Brahimaj	def.	Billy Ray Goff	Technical Submission (guillotine choke)	1	3:16
Light Heavyweight	Dustin Jacoby	def.	Bruno Lopes	KO (punches)	1	1:50
Women's Featherweight	Ketlen Vieira	def.	Macy Chiasson	Decision (unanimous) (30–27, 29–28, 29–28)	3	5:00
Middleweight	Zachary Reese	def.	Duško Todorović	Decision (unanimous) (29–28, 29–28, 29–28)	3	5:00
Preliminary card (ESPN+)
Catchweight (127.5 lb)	Allan Nascimento	def.	Jafel Filho	Decision (unanimous) (29–28, 29–28, 29–28)	3	5:00
Lightweight	Jordan Leavitt	def.	Kurt Holobaugh	Technical Submission (anaconda choke)	1	1:39
Lightweight	Bolaji Oki	def.	Michael Aswell	Decision (unanimous) (29–28, 29–28, 29–28)	3	5:00
Women's Strawweight	Alice Ardelean	def.	Rayanne dos Santos	Decision (unanimous) (30–27, 29–28, 29–28)	3	5:00

== Bonus awards ==
The following fighters received $50,000 bonuses.

- Fight of the Night: Alice Ardelean vs. Rayanne dos Santos
- Performance of the Night: Ramiz Brahimaj and Jordan Leavitt

== See also ==
- 2025 in UFC
- List of current UFC fighters
- List of UFC events
