= Shino VanHoose =

American mixed martial arts (MMA) fighter

- Born: June 3, 1995 (age 31); Hachinohe, Japan
- Nationality: American
- Height: 163 cm (5 ft 4 in)
- Weight: 105 lb (48 kg; 7 st 7 lb)
- Division: Atomweight
- Reach: 63 in (160 cm)
- Style: Muay Thai, Brazilian jiu-jitsu
- Fighting out of: Boise, Idaho, United States
- Team: Combat Fitness; SBG Idaho
- Years active: 2011-2019

Mixed martial arts record
- Total: 14
- Wins: 6
- By knockout: 1
- By submission: 3
- By decision: 2
- Losses: 7
- By knockout: 1
- By submission: 2
- By decision: 4
- Draws: 1

Other information
- Mixed martial arts record from Sherdog

Shino VanHoose (born 3 June 1995) is an American mixed martial artist, currently competing in the Atomweight division. She previously competed in Invicta Fighting Championships.

== Mixed martial arts career ==
=== Asian circuit ===
VanHoose made her professional debut against Nana Ichikawa at Pancrase - Impressive Tour 10 on October 2, 2011. She won by a first-round ezekiel choke submission.

VanHoose was scheduled to face Asami Higa at Jewels: 17th Ring on December 17, 2011. She won the fight by unanimous decision.

VanHoose was scheduled to face Kimie Okada at Pancrase - Progress Tour 3 on March 11, 2012. She won the fight by a first-round submission.

VanHoose was scheduled to face Kikuyo Ishikawa at Pancrase - Progress Tour 6 on May 20, 2012. She lost the fight by unanimous decision.

VanHoose was scheduled to face Sadae Numata at Pancrase - Progress Tour 12: All Eyes on Yuki Kondo on November 10, 2012. She lost the fight by a second-round submission.

VanHoose was scheduled to face the pound for pound great Seo Hee Ham at Road FC Korea 003: Korea vs. Brazil on April 6, 2014. Ham won the fight by unanimous decision.

=== Return to the US ===
VanHoose was scheduled to face Jody-Lynn Reicher at ICF 22 - Tough Enough to Fight in Pink on October 16, 2015. She won the fight by a first-round submission.

VanHoose was scheduled to make her Invicta FC debut against Amber Brown at Invicta FC 15: Cyborg vs. Ibragimova on January 16, 2016. Brown won the fight by a first-round guillotine choke.

VanHoose was scheduled to face Jenny Silverio at RFC 36 - Resurrection on February 26, 2016. Silverio won by split decision.

VanHoose was scheduled to face Sarah Lagerstrom at Front Street Fights 10 on December 9, 2016. She won the fight by a second-round technical knockout.

=== Invicta FC ===
VanHoose was scheduled to face Alyse Anderson at Invicta FC 25: Kunitskaya vs. Pa'aluhi on August 31, 2017. She won the fight by split decision.

VanHoose was scheduled to face Lindsey VanZandt at Invicta FC 37: Gonzalez vs. Sanchez on October 4, 2019, following a two-year absence from the sport. VanZandt won the fight by a first-round technical knockout.

In her next fight, over five years later, VanHoose would return to face Liana Ferreira Pirosin at Invicta FC 60 on February 7, 2025. She would lose the fight via unanimous decision.

== Mixed martial arts record ==
Professional record breakdown
13 matches	6 wins	7 losses
By knockout	1	1
By submission	3	2
By decision	2	4

Res.	Record	Opponent	Method	Event	Date	Round	Time	Location	Notes
Draw	5–7–1	Natalie Schlesinger	Draw (unanimous)	Fight Club OC: Schlesinger vs. VanHoose	April 9, 2026	3	5:00	Costa Mesa, California, United States	Catchweight (110 lb) bout.
Loss	5–7	Liana Ferreira Pirosin	Decision (unanimous)	Invicta FC 60	February 7, 2025	3	5:00	Atlanta, Georgia, United States	Strawweight debut.
Loss	5–6	Lindsey VanZandt	TKO (leg kick)	Invicta FC 37	October 4, 2019	1	0:39	Kansas City, Kansas, United States	
Win	5–5	Alyse Anderson	Decision (split)	Invicta FC 25	August 31, 2017	3	5:00	Lemoore, California, United States	
Win	4–5	Sarah Lagerstrom	TKO (elbows and punches)	Front Street Fights 10	December 9, 2016	2	1:36	Boise, Idaho, United States	
Loss	3–5	Jenny Silverio	Decision (split)	Real FC 36	February 26, 2016	3	5:00	Tampa, Florida, United States	
Loss	3–4	Amber Brown	Submission (guillotine choke)	Invicta FC 15	January 16, 2016	1	2:36	Costa Mesa, California, United States	
Win	3–3	Jody Lynn Reicher	Submission (armbar)	Intense CF 12	October 16, 2015	1	1:53	Great Falls, Montana, United States	
Loss	2–3	Ham Seo-hee	Decision (unanimous)	Road FC Korea 3	April 6, 2014	2	5:00	Seoul, South Korea	
Loss	2–2	Sadae Numata	Submission (kneebar)	Pancrase: Progress Tour 12	November 10, 2012	2	2:18	Tokyo, Japan	
Loss	2–1	Kikuyo Ishikawa	Decision (unanimous)	Pancrase: Progress Tour 6	May 20, 2012	2	5:00	Tokyo, Japan	
Win	2–0	Kimie Okada	Technical Submission (armbar)	Pancrase: Progress Tour 3	March 11, 2012	1	2:40	Tokyo, Japan	
Win	1–0	Asami Higa	Decision (unanimous)	Jewels 17th Ring	December 17, 2011	2	5:00	Tokyo, Japan	Atomweight debut.

== See also ==
- List of female mixed martial artists
- List of current Invicta FC fighters
