= UFC Fight Night: Burns vs. Morales =

Mixed martial arts event in 2025

- The poster for UFC Fight Night: Burns vs. Morales
- Promotion: Ultimate Fighting Championship
- Date: May 17, 2025
- Venue: UFC Apex
- City: Enterprise, Nevada, United States
- Attendance: Not announced

Event chronology
UFC 315: Muhammad vs. Della Maddalena	UFC Fight Night: Burns vs. Morales	UFC on ESPN: Gamrot vs. Klein

UFC Fight Night: Burns vs. Morales (also known as UFC Fight Night 256 and UFC Vegas 106 and UFC on ESPN+ 114) was a mixed martial arts event produced by the Ultimate Fighting Championship that took place on May 17, 2025, at the UFC Apex in Enterprise, Nevada, part of the Las Vegas Valley, United States.

== Background ==
Initially, there were reports that the event would take place at the Lusail Sports Arena in Lusail, Qatar. However, the event location was changed to the UFC Apex for unknown reasons.

A welterweight bout between former UFC Welterweight Championship challenger Gilbert Burns and undefeated prospect Michael Morales headlined this event. The pairing was originally scheduled to be part of UFC 314 and later UFC 315 prior to being moved to this event.

A heavyweight bout between former interim UFC Heavyweight Championship challenger Curtis Blaydes and promotional newcomer Rizvan Kuniev was scheduled for this event. However, the bout was moved to UFC on ABC: Hill vs. Rountree Jr. on June 21 for unknown reasons. The pairing was originally scheduled for UFC Fight Night: Cejudo vs. Song, then shifted to UFC 313 and was eventually cancelled a few hours before the event after Blaydes had to pull out due to an undisclosed illness.

A middleweight bout between Park Jun-yong and Ismail Naurdiev was scheduled for this event. However, for unknown reasons, the bout was rescheduled to UFC on ABC: Hill vs. Rountree Jr. on June 21.

A light heavyweight bout between Johnny Walker and Azamat Murzakanov was scheduled for this event. However, the bout was moved to UFC 316 for unknown reasons.

Serghei Spivac and Shamil Gaziev were expected to meet in a heavyweight bout at the event. However, the bout was moved to UFC 316 due to undisclosed reasons.

A heavyweight bout between Hamdy Abdelwahab and The Ultimate Fighter: Team Peña vs. Team Nunes heavyweight winner Mohammed Usman was scheduled for this event. However, the bout was moved to UFC on ABC: Hill vs. Rountree Jr. for unknown reasons.

Promotional newcomer Aaron Pico was briefly expected to make his debut in a featherweight bout against Movsar Evloev at this event. However, on an interview, Pico revealed that although it was close to being signed, the bout did not come to fruition.

A light heavyweight bout between Paul Craig and former interim LFA Light Heavyweight Champion Rodolfo Bellato was scheduled to take place as the co-main event. However, during the broadcast, it was announced that the bout was cancelled as a result of Bellato having a herpes infection and was eventually rescheduled for UFC on ESPN: Usman vs. Buckley one month later.

== Results ==
Main card (ESPN+)
Weight class				Method	Round	Time	Notes
Welterweight	Michael Morales	def.	Gilbert Burns	TKO (punches)	1	3:39
Lightweight	Mairon Santos	def.	Sodiq Yusuff	Decision (unanimous) (30–27, 30–27, 29–28)	3	5:00
Middleweight	Nursulton Ruziboev	def.	Dustin Stoltzfus	Decision (unanimous) (30–27, 29–28, 29–28)	3	5:00
Featherweight	Melquizael Costa	def.	Julian Erosa	Decision (unanimous) (29–28, 29–28, 29–28)	3	5:00
Preliminary card (ESPN+)
Lightweight	Gabriel Green	def.	Matheus Camilo	Submission (face crank)	2	3:43
Lightweight	Jared Gordon	def.	Thiago Moisés	KO (punches)	1	3:37
Featherweight	Yadier del Valle	def.	Connor Matthews	Submission (rear-naked choke)	1	2:54
Women's Bantamweight	Luana Santos	def.	Tainara Lisboa	Submission (keylock)	2	4:59
Women's Strawweight	Denise Gomes	def.	Elise Reed	TKO (punches)	2	0:30
Flyweight	Park Hyun-sung	def.	Carlos Hernandez	Submission (rear-naked choke)	1	2:26
Women's Strawweight	Tecia Pennington	def.	Luana Pinheiro	Decision (unanimous) (29–28, 29–28, 29–28)	3	5:00

== Bonus awards ==
The following fighters received $50,000 bonuses.

- Fight of the Night: Melquizael Costa vs. Julian Erosa
- Performance of the Night: Michael Morales and Denise Gomes

== See also ==
- 2025 in UFC
- List of current UFC fighters
- List of UFC events
