= Lindsey VanZandt =

American mixed martial arts (MMA) fighter

- Born: August 6, 1993 (age 33); Wappingers Falls, New York, U.S.
- Other names: Damsel
- Height: 5 ft 2 in (157 cm)
- Weight: 105 lb (48 kg; 7 st 7 lb)
- Division: Atomweight
- Style: Taekwondo, Brazilian jiu-jitsu
- Stance: Orthodox
- Fighting out of: Scottsdale, Arizona, U.S.
- Team: Fight Ready
- Trainer: Santino DeFranco
- Rank: Brown belt in Brazilian Jiu Jitsu; Second-degree black belt in Taekwondo
- Years active: 2017 - present

Mixed martial arts record
- Total: 15
- Wins: 8
- By knockout: 5
- By submission: 2
- By decision: 1
- Losses: 7
- By knockout: 3
- By decision: 4

Other information
- University: Bachelor's degree in Nutrition & Dietetics at the University of North Florida
- Mixed martial arts record from Sherdog

Lindsey VanZandt (born August 6, 1993) is an American mixed martial artist who fought in the atomweight division of Invicta FC.

== Mixed martial arts career ==
=== Early career ===
VanZandt made her professional debut against Katie Saull at KOTC - Regulator. She won the fight by a second-round technical knockout. VanZandt was next scheduled to fight Rachel Sazoff at Maverick MMA 3. She once again won the fight by a second-round technical knockout. VanZandt returned to KOTC for her third professional fight, being scheduled to fight Bi Nguyen at KOTC - Locked In. She won the fight by split decision.

=== Invicta FC ===
Her 3-0 record earned VanZandt the notice of Invicta FC. She was scheduled to make her debut with the organization against Kelly D'Angelo at Invicta FC 31 - Jandiroba vs. Morandin. D'Angelo won the fight by unanimous decision.

VanZandt rebounded from her first professional loss with a second-round TKO victory against Melissa Karagianis at KOTC - New Frontier. She was then scheduled to fight Tabatha Ann Watkins at Bellator 222. VanZandt won her promotional debut with Bellator by a second-round technical knockout.

VanZandt was scheduled to fight Rena Kubota at Bellator 222. She won the fight by a first-round rear-naked choke.

VanZandt was scheduled to fight Jéssica Delboni at Invicta FC 36 - Sorenson vs. Young. Delboni won the fight by split decision.

VanZandt was scheduled to fight Shino VanHoose at Invicta FC 37: Gonzalez vs. Sanchez. VanZandt won the fight by a first-round technical knockout.

VanZandt was scheduled to fight a rematch with Rena Kubota at Rizin 20. Kubota won the fight by a third-round technical knockout.

VanZandt was scheduled to fight Alesha Zappitella at Invicta FC 40: Ducote vs. Lima. Zappitella won the fight by split decision (28-29, 29-27, 30-27). The majority of media members scored the fight for Zappitella.

VanZandt took part in the Invicta FC Phoenix Tournament, which was held to determine the next atomweight title challenger. She earned her place in the finals with decision wins against Katie Perez and Linda Mihalec. VanZandt lost the final bout against Jéssica Delboni by unanimous decision.

VanZandt faced Jillian DeCoursey on May 11, 2022 at Invicta FC 47. She lost the bout after getting knocked out in the first round.

== Mixed martial arts record ==
=== Professional ===
Professional record breakdown
| 15 matches | 8 wins | 7 losses |
| By knockout | 5 | 3 |
| By submission | 2 | 0 |
| By decision | 1 | 4 |

| Res. | Record | Opponent | Method | Event | Date | Round | Time | Location | Notes |
|---|---|---|---|---|---|---|---|---|---|
| Win | 8–7 | Shannon Goughary | Submission (armbar) | Victory Fighting League: The Road to Redemption | December 12, 2025 | 3 | 1:54 | New York City, New York, United States | Flyweight debut. |
| Loss | 7–7 | Marisa Messer-Belenchia | TKO (punches to the body) | Reality Fighting: Messer-Belenchia vs. VanZandt | October 4, 2025 | 3 | 2:00 | Uncasville, Connecticut, United States | For the vacant RF Women's Atomweight Championship. |
| Loss | 7–6 | Jillian DeCoursey | KO (punch) | Invicta FC 47 | May 11, 2022 | 1 | 1:01 | Kansas City, Kansas, United States | |
| Loss | 7–5 | Jéssica Delboni | Decision (unanimous) | Invicta FC: Phoenix Series 4 | June 11, 2021 | 3 | 5:00 | Kansas City, Kansas, United States | Invicta FC Phoenix Atomweight Tournament Final. |
| Loss | 7–4 | Alesha Zappitella | Decision (split) | Invicta FC 40 | July 2, 2020 | 3 | 5:00 | Kansas City, Kansas, United States | |
| Loss | 7–3 | Rena Kubota | TKO (corner stoppage) | Rizin 20 | December 31, 2019 | 3 | 4:42 | Saitama, Japan | Catchweight (112 lb) bout. |
| Win | 7–2 | Shino VanHoose | TKO (leg kick) | Invicta FC 37 | October 4, 2019 | 1 | 0:39 | Kansas City, Kansas, United States | |
| Loss | 6–2 | Jéssica Delboni | Decision (split) | Invicta FC 36 | August 9, 2019 | 3 | 5:00 | Kansas City, Kansas, United States | |
| Win | 6–1 | Rena Kubota | Technical Submission (rear-naked choke) | Bellator 222 | June 14, 2019 | 1 | 4:04 | New York, New York, United States | Catchweight (112 lb) bout. |
| Win | 5–1 | Tabatha Ann Watkins | TKO (punches) | Bellator 215 | February 15, 2019 | 2 | 3:25 | Uncasville, Connecticut, United States | |
| Win | 4–1 | Melissa Karagianis | TKO (punches) | KOTC: New Frontier | October 13, 2018 | 2 | 1:54 | Hanover, Maryland, United States | |
| Loss | 3–1 | Kelly D'Angelo | Decision (unanimous) | Invicta FC 31 | September 1, 2018 | 3 | 5:00 | Kansas City, Missouri, United States | |
| Win | 3–0 | Bi Nguyen | Decision (split) | KOTC: Locked In | October 28, 2017 | 3 | 5:00 | Philadelphia, Pennsylvania, United States | |
| Win | 2–0 | Rachel Sazoff | TKO (punches) | Maverick MMA 3 | September 30, 2017 | 2 | 4:42 | Stroudsburg, Pennsylvania, United States | |
| Win | 1–0 | Katie Saull | TKO (punches) | KOTC: Regulator | July 1, 2017 | 2 | 1:25 | Philadelphia, Pennsylvania, United States | Atomweight debut. |

=== Amateur ===
Professional record breakdown
| 6 matches | 3 wins | 3 losses |
| By submission | 3 | 1 |
| By decision | 0 | 2 |

| Res. | Record | Opponent | Method | Event | Date | Round | Time | Location | Notes |
|---|---|---|---|---|---|---|---|---|---|
| Loss | 3–3 | Jillian DeCoursey | Decision (unanimous) | KTFO & ACC - Worlds Collide | December 16, 2016 | 3 | 3:00 | Westbury, New York | |
| Win | 3–2 | Jessica Branco | Submission (triangle choke) | XFN 10 - Xtreme Fighting Nation 10: Tournament of Titans | September 24, 2016 | 1 | 2:50 | Fort Lauderdale, Florida | |
| Loss | 2–2 | Gillian Robertson | Decision (unanimous) | CN 52 - Combat Night 52 | October 10, 2015 | 3 | 3:00 | Jacksonville, Florida | |
| Loss | 2–1 | Caitlin Sammons | Submission (armbar) | Breakthrough MMA 17 - Champions Emerge | August 15, 2015 | 3 | 1:39 | Kansas City, Kansas | |
| Win | 2-0 | Shawna Lee Ormsby | Submission (armbar) | CN 47 - Combat Night 47 | June 6, 2015 | 2 | N/A | Jacksonville, Florida | |
| Win | 1-0 | Laura Johnson | Submission (armbar) | CN 27 - Combat Night 27 | March 22, 2015 | 2 | N/A | Jacksonville, Florida | |

== See also ==
- List of female mixed martial artists
