= UFC Fight Night: Rodríguez vs. Caceres =

UFC mixed martial arts event in 2016

UFC Fight Night: Rodríguez vs Caceres
- The poster for UFC Fight Night: Rodríguez vs Caceres
- Promotion: Ultimate Fighting Championship
- Date: August 6, 2016
- Venue: Vivint Smart Home Arena
- City: Salt Lake City, Utah, United States
- Attendance: 6,689
- Total gate: $481,033

Event chronology
| UFC 201: Lawler vs. Woodley | UFC Fight Night: Rodríguez vs Caceres | UFC 202: Diaz vs. McGregor 2 |

UFC Fight Night: Rodríguez vs. Caceres (also known as UFC Fight Night 92) was a mixed martial arts event produced by the Ultimate Fighting Championship held on August 6, 2016, at Vivint Smart Home Arena in Salt Lake City, Utah.

== Background ==
The event was the first that the organization has hosted in Utah.

The promotion previously scheduled an event for Salt Lake City in August 2010 for UFC Live: Jones vs. Matyushenko. However, the event was moved to San Diego, California due to lower than anticipated ticket sales in the Utah market.

A featherweight bout between The Ultimate Fighter: Latin America featherweight winner Yair Rodríguez and Alex Caceres served as the event headliner.

Brad Tavares was very briefly linked to a bout with Thales Leites at the event. However, Tavares was forced out of the fight with a rib injury and was replaced by Chris Camozzi.

Justine Kish was expected to face Maryna Moroz at the event. However, Kish pulled out of the bout on July 22 due to a spiral fracture of her finger. She was replaced six days later by promotion newcomer Danielle Taylor.

This was the last UFC event to be promoted by Frank and Lorenzo Fertitta.

== Results ==
Main Card (Fox Sports 1)
| Weight class | | | | Method | Round | Time | Notes |
|---|---|---|---|---|---|---|---|
| Featherweight | Yair Rodríguez | def. | Alex Caceres | Decision (split) (46–49, 48–47, 48–47) | 5 | 5:00 |
| Featherweight | Dennis Bermudez | def. | Rony Jason | Decision (unanimous) (30–27, 30–26, 30–27) | 3 | 5:00 |
| Middleweight | Thales Leites | def. | Chris Camozzi | Submission (rear-naked choke) | 3 | 2:58 |
| Welterweight | Santiago Ponzinibbio | def. | Zak Cummings | Decision (unanimous) (29–28, 29–28, 30–27) | 3 | 5:00 |
| Middleweight | Trevor Smith | def. | Joe Gigliotti | Decision (unanimous) (30–26, 30–26, 30–26) | 3 | 5:00 |
| Women's Strawweight | Maryna Moroz | def. | Danielle Taylor | Decision (split) (28–29, 29–28, 30–27) | 3 | 5:00 |
Preliminary Card (Fox Sports 1)
| Welterweight | Court McGee | def. | Dominique Steele | Decision (unanimous) (30–27, 29–28, 29–28) | 3 | 5:00 |
| Heavyweight | Marcin Tybura | def. | Viktor Pešta | KO (head kick) | 2 | 0:53 |
| Lightweight | David Teymur | def. | Jason Novelli | TKO (punches) | 2 | 1:25 |
| Featherweight | Teruto Ishihara | def. | Horacio Gutiérrez | TKO (punches) | 1 | 2:32 |
Preliminary Card (UFC Fight Pass)
| Featherweight | Cub Swanson | def. | Tatsuya Kawajiri | Decision (unanimous) (30–27, 30–27, 29–28) | 3 | 5:00 |
| Heavyweight | Justin Ledet | def. | Chase Sherman | Decision (unanimous) (30–27, 30–27, 30–27) | 3 | 5:00 |

== Bonus awards ==
The following fighters were awarded $50,000 bonuses:

- Fight of the Night: Yair Rodríguez vs. Alex Caceres
- Performance of the Night: Marcin Tybura and Teruto Ishihara

== See also ==
- List of UFC events
- 2016 in UFC
