= Jessica Penne =

American mixed martial artist (born 1983)

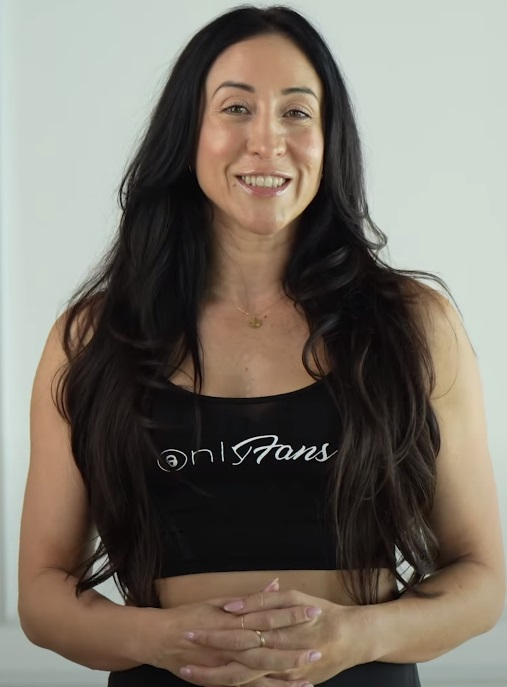
- Penne in 2024
- Born: January 30, 1983 (age 43); Newport Beach, California, United States
- Height: 5 ft 5 in (1.65 m)
- Weight: 115 lb (52 kg; 8.2 st)
- Division: Strawweight (2014–present); Atomweight (2006–2014)
- Reach: 67 in (170 cm)
- Fighting out of: Huntington Beach, California, United States
- Team: Alliance MMA; Kings MMA; Checkmat; Reign MMA (formerly); SubFighter MMA
- Rank: Black belt in Brazilian Jiu-Jitsu under Lucas Leite; Brown belt in Judo
- Years active: 2006–present

Mixed martial arts record
- Total: 22
- Wins: 14
- By knockout: 2
- By submission: 8
- By decision: 4
- Losses: 8
- By knockout: 2
- By submission: 2
- By decision: 4

Other information
- Website: jessicapenne.com
- Mixed martial arts record from Sherdog

Jessica Penne (born January 30, 1983) is an American professional mixed martial artist. Penne competed in the Women's Strawweight division for the Ultimate Fighting Championship (UFC), where she was a one-time challenger for the championship. She was the first Invicta FC Atomweight Champion. She also competed in the first women's bout in Bellator Fighting Championships.

== Background ==
Penne was born in Newport Beach, California, on January 30, 1983, and graduated from Diamond Bar High School, participating on the softball and swimming teams. Next at Cal State Fullerton, she earned her Bachelor of Arts in communication. Penne is Italian American. Her father is the first generation of his Italian family born in the United States. Some of his family members remain in his family’s originating area of Turino, Italy.

== Mixed martial arts career ==
=== Bellator ===
In May 2009, Penne became the first woman to compete and win a bout in the Bellator Fighting Championships organization when she fought at Bellator 5 against Tammie Schneider in a 117-pound catchweight bout. She won the fight via TKO (punches) in the first round.

In August 2010, Penne met future Bellator Strawweight Champion Zoila Gurgel in the opening quarterfinal round of the Bellator Season 3 115 lb women's tournament at Bellator 25. Penne lost the fight via unanimous decision.

=== Shoot Boxing ===
In September 2011, Penne agreed to fight two-time Girls S-Cup champion Rena Kubota in a shoot boxing bout in Japan. Shoot boxing allows kicks, punches, knees, throws, and standing submissions (chokeholds, armlocks and wristlocks). Penne was added to the Shoot Boxing 2011: Act 4 fight card against Rena Kubota a week before the event. Penne beat the heavily favored Kubota in a significant upset. The bout was ruled a majority draw after the first three scheduled rounds with scores of 29–29, 29–29, and 30–29 (Penne). The fight then went to a fourth extension round, which was judged a split draw with scores of 10–9 (Kubota), 10–9 (Penne), and 10–10. The fifth and final round went to the scorecards as well and Penne was awarded the majority decision (10–9, 10–9, and 9–9).

=== Invicta FC ===
In February 2012, it was announced that Penne was signed by the upstart all-women's promotion Invicta Fighting Championships.

On April 28, 2012, Penne made her Invicta debut at their inaugural event entitled Invicta FC 1: Coenen vs. Ruyssen, against Lisa Ellis in the co-main event. She won the fight via TKO (strikes) at 2:48 of round 3.

Penne competed once again for Invicta on October 6, 2012, this time headlining Invicta FC 3: Penne vs. Sugiyama against the then-#1 ranked Atomweight fighter in the world and Jewels 105-pound champion, Naho Sugiyama. The fight marked the first championship bout in Invicta's history, in any weight class. Penne became Invicta's first Atomweight champion when she defeated Sugiyama in the second round via triangle choke.

Penne's first defense of the championship headlined Invicta FC 5: Penne vs. Waterson when she defended against Michelle Waterson on April 5, 2013. Penne lost the fight and the championship via armbar submission in the fourth round.

Penne faced Nicdali Rivera-Calanoc at Invicta FC 6: Coenen vs. Cyborg on July 13, 2013. She defeated Rivera-Calanoc by submission due to a rear-naked choke in the first round. Penne received a "Submission of the Night" bonus for the victory.

=== The Ultimate Fighter ===
On July 3, 2014, it was announced that Penne was one of 16 contestants on The Ultimate Fighter: Team Pettis vs. Team Melendez, which would crown the Ultimate Fighting Championship's first strawweight champion.

Penne was the fifth pick by coach Anthony Pettis. She faced Lisa Ellis in the preliminary round of the tournament and won via submission in the first round. She defeated fellow Team Pettis teammate Aisling Daly in the quarterfinals via decision win. In the semifinal round, she lost to her friend Carla Esparza by decision.

=== Ultimate Fighting Championship ===
Penne made her UFC debut on December 12, 2014, at The Ultimate Fighter: A Champion Will Be Crowned Finale, facing fellow semifinalist Randa Markos on the main card. Penne won the back-and-forth fight by split decision (28–29, 30–27, and 29–28). The bout also won Penne her first Fight of the Night bonus award from the promotion.

==== Strawweight title shot ====
Penne was scheduled to face Juliana Lima on May 30, 2015, at UFC Fight Night 67. However, Penne was pulled from that bout in favor of a match-up with UFC Women's Strawweight Champion Joanna Jędrzejczyk on June 20, 2015, at UFC Fight Night 69, after that event's headliner bout fell apart. She lost the fight in the third round via TKO following a flurry of punches and a knee against the cage. Both participants were awarded Fight of the Night honors.

==== Post title shot ====
In her first fight following her title shot loss, Penne faced Jéssica Andrade on June 4, 2016, at UFC 199. She lost the fight via TKO in the second round.

Penne next faced Danielle Taylor on April 22, 2017, at UFC Fight Night: Swanson vs. Lobov. She lost the fight via unanimous decision.

On May 10, 2017, it was announced that Penne had been flagged by USADA for anti-doping violation from a March 2017 out of competition sample. Originally reported as negative, athlete biological passport abnormalities caused USADA to re-analyse the sample using Isotope-ratio mass spectrometry which detected an anabolic steroid of exogenous origin. On January 5, 2018, Penne was suspended for 18 months, a reduction of 6 months, due to her taking a DHEA supplement on a physicians recommendation. She was eligible to compete in October 2018.

Penne was scheduled to face Jodie Esquibel on February 17, 2019, at UFC on ESPN 1. At the weigh-ins, Penne weighed in at 118 pounds, 2 pounds over the strawweight non-title fight upper limit of 116 pounds. As a result, the bout was expected at catchweight and Penne was fined 20% of her purse which went to her opponent Esquibel. However, Penne then injured her ankle on the morning of the fight and the bout was cancelled. The pair was rescheduled to meet on April 27, 2019, at UFC Fight Night: Jacaré vs. Hermansson. However, it was reported on April 18, 2019, that Penne pulled out of the bout, due to an injury, and she was replaced by Angela Hill.

==== Four-year ban from a drug test failure ====
Penne faced a four-year ban from competition from the United States Anti Doping Agency, following a second infraction of the USADA program. A GoFundMe page was set up to prepare a lawsuit against USADA, however in early February Penne's manager closed it down due to favorable progress with USADA. On February 28, 2020, it was reported that the suspension reduced from four years to 20 months. The suspension was retroactive from April 8, 2019, and Penne became eligible to fight again on December 8, 2020.

==== Returning to competition after suspension ====
Penne's first fight after USADA suspension was scheduled to take place on March 27, 2021, against Hannah Goldy at UFC 260. However, Goldy pulled out of the fight on March 24, due to testing positive for COVID-19, and the bout was scrapped. The pairing was rescheduled to UFC on ESPN 22 on April 17, 2021. A week before the bout, Goldy pulled out of the event, and she was replaced by LFA Women's Strawweight champion Lupita Godinez. Penne won the close bout via split decision. 11 out of 17 media scores gave it to Godinez.

Penne faced Karolina Kowalkiewicz on August 7, 2021, at UFC 265. She won the fight via an arm bar in round one. This fight earned her the Performance of the Night award.

Penne was scheduled to face Luana Pinheiro on November 20, 2021, at UFC Fight Night 198. However Penne withdrew from the bout for undisclosed reason and she was replaced by Sam Hughes. Penne was rescheduled to face Pinheiro on April 30, 2022, at UFC on ESPN 35. They were once again scrapped as Pinheiro pulled out due to an undisclosed injury.

Penne was scheduled to face Brianna Fortino on July 16, 2022, at UFC on ABC 3. However, Fortino withdrew in early June for unknown reasons and was replaced by Emily Ducote. She lost the fight via unanimous decision.

Cheyanne Vlismas was scheduled to face Tabatha Ricci, but Penne stepped in replacing Vlismas, who pulled out for October 1, 2022, at UFC Fight Night 211, however the fight was cancelled due to an illness with Penne on the day of the weigh in's.

Penne faced Tabatha Ricci on March 4, 2023, at UFC 285. She lost the fight via an armbar in the second round.

Penne faced former Cage Fury FC Women's Strawweight Champion Elise Reed on October 19, 2024 at UFC Fight Night 245. She lost the fight by unanimous decision.

On October 29, 2024, it was announced that Penne was released from the UFC.

=== Global Fight League ===
Penne was scheduled to face Joice Mara in the inaugural Global Fight League event on May 24, 2025 at GFL 1. However, all GFL events were cancelled indefinitely.

== Fighting style ==
Penne is a kickboxer who also utilizes grappling and jiu-jitsu. While standing, she often attacks with hooks, body kicks, and knees from a clinch. Penne regularly attempts to take opponents to the mat, normally with clinches, trips, or takedown reversals. During a grappling session, she will usually attack with strikes before attempting a submission. Penne earned her black belt in Brazilian jiu-jitsu under Lucas Leite in January 2015.

== Championships and accomplishments ==
=== Mixed martial arts ===
- Ultimate Fighting Championship
  - Fight of the Night (Two times) vs. Randa Markos and Joanna Jedrzejczyk
  - Performance of the Night (One time) vs. Karolina Kowalkiewicz
- Invicta Fighting Championships
  - Atomweight Championship (One time; first)
  - Submission of the Night (One time)
- Bellator Fighting Championships
  - Competed in and won the First Women's fight in Bellator history at Bellator 5
- Women's MMA Awards
  - 2013 Fight of the Year vs. Michelle Waterson on April 5
- FightBooth.com
  - 2012 Lady Violence Award

== Mixed martial arts record ==
Professional record breakdown
22 matches	14 wins	8 losses
By knockout	2	2
By submission	8	2
By decision	4	4

Res.	Record	Opponent	Method	Event	Date	Round	Time	Location	Notes
Loss	14–8	Elise Reed	Decision (unanimous)	UFC Fight Night: Hernandez vs. Pereira	October 19, 2024	3	5:00	Las Vegas, Nevada, United States	
Loss	14–7	Tabatha Ricci	Submission (armbar)	UFC 285	March 4, 2023	2	2:14	Las Vegas, Nevada, United States	
Loss	14–6	Emily Ducote	Decision (unanimous)	UFC on ABC: Ortega vs. Rodríguez	July 16, 2022	3	5:00	Elmont, New York, United States	
Win	14–5	Karolina Kowalkiewicz	Submission (armbar)	UFC 265	August 7, 2021	1	4:32	Houston, Texas, United States	Performance of the Night.
Win	13–5	Lupita Godinez	Decision (split)	UFC on ESPN: Whittaker vs. Gastelum	April 17, 2021	3	5:00	Las Vegas, Nevada, United States	
Loss	12–5	Danielle Taylor	Decision (unanimous)	UFC Fight Night: Swanson vs. Lobov	April 22, 2017	3	5:00	Nashville, Tennessee, United States	
Loss	12–4	Jéssica Andrade	TKO (punches)	UFC 199	June 4, 2016	2	2:56	Inglewood, California, United States	
Loss	12–3	Joanna Jędrzejczyk	TKO (punches and knee)	UFC Fight Night: Jędrzejczyk vs. Penne	June 20, 2015	3	4:22	Berlin, Germany	For the UFC Women's Strawweight Championship. Fight of the Night.
Win	12–2	Randa Markos	Decision (split)	The Ultimate Fighter: A Champion Will Be Crowned Finale	December 12, 2014	3	5:00	Las Vegas, Nevada, United States	Return to Strawweight. Fight of the Night.
Win	11–2	Nicdali Rivera-Calanoc	Submission (rear-naked choke)	Invicta FC 6: Coenen vs. Cyborg	July 13, 2013	1	4:57	Kansas City, Missouri, United States	Submission of the Night.
Loss	10–2	Michelle Waterson	Submission (armbar)	Invicta FC 5: Penne vs. Waterson	April 5, 2013	4	2:31	Kansas City, Missouri, United States	Lost the Invicta FC Atomweight Championship.
Win	10–1	Naho Sugiyama	Submission (triangle choke)	Invicta FC 3: Penne vs. Sugiyama	October 6, 2012	2	2:20	Kansas City, Kansas, United States	Won the inaugural Invicta FC Atomweight Championship.
Win	9–1	Lisa Ellis	TKO (punches)	Invicta FC 1: Coenen vs. Ruyssen	April 28, 2012	3	2:48	Kansas City, Kansas, United States	
Win	8–1	Amy Davis	Submission (rear-naked choke)	The Cage Inc.: Battle at the Border 7	November 19, 2010	1	4:17	Hankinson, North Dakota, United States	Atomweight debut.
Loss	7–1	Zoila Frausto	Decision (unanimous)	Bellator 25	August 19, 2010	3	5:00	Chicago, Illinois, United States	Bellator Season 3 Strawweight Tournament Quarterfinal.
Win	7–0	Angela Magaña	Submission (rear-naked choke)	Action Fight League: Rock-N-Rumble	September 25, 2009	2	4:10	Hollywood, Florida, United States	
Win	6–0	Tammie Schneider	TKO (punches)	Bellator 5	May 1, 2009	1	1:35	Dayton, Ohio, United States	Catchweight (117 lb) bout.
Win	5–0	Alicia Gumm	Decision (unanimous)	RMBB: Caged Vengeance	November 8, 2008	2	5:00	Sheridan, Colorado, United States	
Win	4–0	Heather Basquil	Decision (unanimous)	Fist Series: WinterFist 2008	February 20, 2008	3	3:00	Orange County, California, United States	
Win	3–0	Sumie Sakai	Submission (armbar)	FFF 2: Girls Night Out	July 14, 2007	3	0:33	Compton, California, United States	
Win	2–0	Brandy Nerney	Submission (rear-naked choke)	FFF 1: Asian Invasion	February 17, 2007	1	1:20	Los Angeles, California, United States	
Win	1–0	Sally Krumdiack	Submission (arm-triangle choke)	HOOKnSHOOT: The Women Return	November 18, 2006	1	4:20	Evansville, Indiana, United States	

Exhibition record breakdown		
3 matches	2 wins	1 loss
By submission	1	0
By decision	1	1

Res.	Record	Opponent	Method	Event	Date	Round	Time	Location	Notes
Loss	2–1	Carla Esparza	Decision (unanimous)	The Ultimate Fighter: A Champion Will Be Crowned	December 10, 2014 (airdate)	3	5:00	Las Vegas, Nevada, United States	TUF 20 Semifinal round
Win	2–0	Aisling Daly	Decision (unanimous)	The Ultimate Fighter: A Champion Will Be Crowned	November 26, 2014 (airdate)	3	5:00	Las Vegas, Nevada, United States	TUF 20 Quarterfinal round
Win	1–0	Lisa Ellis	Submission (rear-naked choke)	The Ultimate Fighter: A Champion Will Be Crowned	September 24, 2014 (airdate)	1	3:46	Las Vegas, Nevada, United States	TUF 20 Elimination round

== Shoot boxing record ==
Res.	Record	Opponent	Method	Event	Date	Round	Time	Location	Notes
Win	1–0	Rena Kubota	Decision (majority)	Shoot Boxing 2011: Act 4	September 10, 2011	5 (Ex.2)	3:00	Koto, Tokyo, Japan	

== See also ==
- List of female mixed martial artists

Awards and achievements
Preceded by New championship	1st Invicta FC Atomweight Champion; October 6, 2012 – April 5, 2013	Succeeded by Michelle Waterson
