= Juliana Lima =

Brazilian mixed martial artist (born 1982)

- Born: Juliana de Lima Carneiro; March 15, 1982 (age 44); Belo Horizonte, Brazil
- Other names: Ju Thai
- Height: 5 ft 5 in (1.65 m)
- Weight: 116 lb (53 kg; 8.3 st)
- Division: Strawweight
- Reach: 70 in (178 cm)
- Team: Gracie Barra BH; Draculino Team
- Rank: Black belt in Brazilian jiu-jitsu under Vinicius Magalhães
- Years active: 2010–present

Mixed martial arts record
- Total: 15
- Wins: 9
- By knockout: 2
- By decision: 7
- Losses: 6
- By submission: 1
- By decision: 5

Other information
- Mixed martial arts record from Sherdog

Juliana de Lima Carneiro (born March 15, 1982) is a Brazilian Jiu-Jitsu practitioner and mixed martial artist. She has fought for the Ultimate Fighting Championship (UFC) and Invicta Fighting Championships.

== Mixed martial arts career ==
=== Early career ===
Lima began her professional MMA career in 2010 in her native Brazil. In the first three years of her career, she went undefeated with a record of 5 wins and no losses. She has also competed in Muay Thai fight and jiu-jitsu tournaments.

=== Invicta FC ===
In April 2013, Lima had her first fight in the United States as she faced Katja Kankaanpää at Invicta FC 5. She suffered the first loss of her career, losing the bout via unanimous decision.

=== Ultimate Fighting Championship ===
In December 2013, it was announced that Lima had been selected to appear as a contestant on The Ultimate Fighter: A Champion Will Be Crowned. However, she was eventually removed from the cast due to being unable to speak English and instead received a direct contract with the UFC.

Lima made her Ultimate Fighting Championship (UFC) debut in July 2014 against Joanna Jędrzejczyk at UFC on Fox 12. She lost the fight via unanimous decision.

For her second fight with the promotion, Lima faced Nina Ansaroff at UFC Fight Night 58 on November 8, 2014. She won the fight by unanimous decision.

Lima was scheduled to fight Jessica Penne at UFC Fight Night 67 on May 30, 2015. However, Penne was pulled from that bout in favor of a matchup with current UFC Women's Strawweight Champion Joanna Jędrzejczyk on June 20, 2015 at UFC Fight Night 69. Lima instead faced Ericka Almeida and won the bout by unanimous decision.

Lima was scheduled to face UFC newcomer Amanda Ribas on July 7, 2017 at The Ultimate Fighter 25 Finale. Ribas, however, was flagged by USADA for a potential anti-doping violation and removed from the bout. Lima instead faced replacement Tecia Torres. Lima lost the fight via submission in the second round.

Lima faced Randa Markos on January 27, 2018 at UFC on Fox 27. She lost the fight via unanimous decision.

=== Return to Invicta ===
In January 2019, Lima signed a six-fight deal with Invicta Fighting Championships. Upon returning, she was announced to participate in Invicta Phoenix Series one-night Strawweight tournament on May 3, 2019. In the opening round Lima faced Danielle Taylor, winning the one-round bout via split decision. She advanced to semifinals, where she was pitted against the tournament's eventual winner Brianna van Buren. She lost the bout via unanimous decision, and was eliminated from the tournament.

On June 9, 2020, it was announced that Lima will be headlining Invicta FC 40: Ducote vs. Lima against Emily Ducote on July 2, 2020. Lima lost the bout via unanimous decision.

=== Taura MMA ===
On August 26, 2020, news surfaced that Lima had signed a contract with Taura MMA.

== Mixed martial arts record ==
Professional record breakdown
| 15 matches | 9 wins | 6 losses |
| By knockout | 2 | 0 |
| By submission | 0 | 1 |
| By decision | 7 | 5 |

| Res. | Record | Opponent | Method | Event | Date | Round | Time | Location | Notes |
|---|---|---|---|---|---|---|---|---|---|
| Loss | 10–7 | Emily Ducote | Decision (unanimous) | Invicta FC 40: Ducote vs. Lima | July 2, 2020 | 3 | 5:00 | Kansas City, Kansas, United States | |
| Loss | 10–6 | Brianna van Buren | Decision (unanimous) | Invicta Phoenix Series 1 | May 3, 2019 | 1 | 5:00 | Kansas City, Kansas, United States | Invicta FC Strawweight Tournament Semifinal. |
| Win | 10–5 | Danielle Taylor | Decision (split) | Invicta Phoenix Series 1 | May 3, 2019 | 1 | 5:00 | Kansas City, Kansas, United States | Invicta FC Strawweight Tournament Quarterfinal. |
| Loss | 9–5 | Randa Markos | Decision (unanimous) | UFC on Fox: Jacaré vs. Brunson 2 | January 27, 2018 | 3 | 5:00 | Charlotte, North Carolina, United States | |
| Loss | 9–4 | Tecia Torres | Submission (rear-naked choke) | The Ultimate Fighter: Redemption Finale | July 7, 2017 | 2 | 0:53 | Las Vegas, Nevada, United States | |
| Win | 9–3 | JJ Aldrich | Decision (unanimous) | UFC Fight Night: Lewis vs. Abdurakhimov | December 9, 2016 | 3 | 5:00 | Albany, New York, United States | |
| Loss | 8–3 | Carla Esparza | Decision (unanimous) | UFC 197 | April 23, 2016 | 3 | 5:00 | Las Vegas, Nevada, United States | |
| Win | 8–2 | Ericka Almeida | Decision (unanimous) | UFC Fight Night: Condit vs. Alves | May 30, 2015 | 3 | 5:00 | Goiânia, Brazil | |
| Win | 7–2 | Nina Ansaroff | Decision (unanimous) | UFC Fight Night: Shogun vs. Saint Preux | November 8, 2014 | 3 | 5:00 | Uberlândia, Brazil | |
| Loss | 6–2 | Joanna Jędrzejczyk | Decision (unanimous) | UFC on Fox: Lawler vs. Brown | July 26, 2014 | 3 | 5:00 | San Jose, California, United States | Catchweight (116.5 lbs) bout; Lima missed weight. |
| Win | 6–1 | Liliani Trolezi | TKO (punches) | Brasil Fight 7: Minas Gerais vs. Federal District | October 11, 2013 | 1 | 1:08 | Divinópolis, Brazil | Flyweight bout. |
| Loss | 5–1 | Katja Kankaanpää | Decision (unanimous) | Invicta FC 5: Penne vs. Waterson | April 5, 2013 | 3 | 5:00 | Kansas City, Missouri, United States | |
| Win | 5–0 | Aline Nery | Decision (unanimous) | Brasil Fight 6: Brazil vs. USA | September 21, 2012 | 3 | 5:00 | Belo Horizonte, Brazil | |
| Win | 4–0 | Patricia de Farias | TKO (punches) | Super Fight Lafaiete | September 1, 2012 | 1 | 3:41 | São Paulo, Brazil | |
| Win | 3–0 | Kinberly Novaes | Decision (unanimous) | Brasil Fight 5: Back to Fight | September 21, 2011 | 3 | 5:00 | Belo Horizonte, Brazil | |
| Win | 2–0 | Dayana Silva | Decision (unanimous) | Brasil Fight 4: The VIP Night | April 9, 2011 | 3 | 5:00 | Nova Lima, Brazil | |
| Win | 1–0 | Aline Serio | Decision (split) | Brasil Fight 3: Minas Gerais vs. São Paulo | November 27, 2010 | 3 | 5:00 | Belo Horizonte, Brazil | |

== See also ==
- List of female mixed martial artists
