= Jéssica Delboni =

Brazilian mixed martial arts (MMA) fighter

- Born: 7 September 1993 (age 33); Vila Velha, Brazil
- Height: 5 ft 1 in (1.55 m)
- Weight: 115 lb (52 kg; 8 st 3 lb)
- Division: Strawweight (2013–2020, 2023); Atomweight (2018–2019, 2021–2022)
- Reach: 62 in (157 cm)
- Fighting out of: Niterói, Brazil
- Team: Paraná Vale Tudo
- Trainer: Gilliard "Paraná" Fagundes
- Rank: Brown belt in Brazilian Jiu Jitsu; Black belt in Taekwondo
- Years active: 2016–present

Mixed martial arts record
- Total: 18
- Wins: 13
- By knockout: 2
- By decision: 11
- Losses: 5
- By knockout: 1
- By submission: 1
- By decision: 3

Other information
- Mixed martial arts record from Sherdog

Jéssica Correa Delboni (born 7 September 1993) is a Brazilian mixed martial artist, currently competing in the atomweight and strawweight divisions of Invicta FC, where she is a former Atomweight champion.

== Mixed martial arts career ==
=== Early career ===
Delboni made her professional debut against Juliana Costa at HCC 12. She won the fight by unanimous decision. Delboni likewise won her next two fights against Cristiane Lima and Bianca Sattelmayer by unanimous decision.

Delboni was scheduled to fight Joice Mara at Shooto Brasil 74. She won the fight by unanimous decision.

Delboni was next scheduled to fight Pamela Ferreira at Angels & Fight Contest 2. She won the fight by unanimous decision. She was afterwards scheduled to fight Bruna Brasil at Maringá Combat 5. Delboni won the fight by TKO.

Delboni was scheduled to fight Liana Pirosin at Imortal FC 8. She beat Pirosin by unanimous decision.

=== Invicta and Shooto Brasil ===
On April 15, 2018, multiple media outlets announced that Delboni had signed with Invicta Fighting Championships.

Delboni was scheduled to make her Invicta debut against Ashley Cummins at Invicta FC 32: Spencer vs. Sorenson. The fight was also Delboni's atomweight debut. Cummins won the fight by unanimous decision.

Delboni was scheduled to fight Maiara Amanajás in a strawweight bout at Shooto Brasil 91. She won the fight by split decision.

For her next fight, Delboni returned both to Invicta and atomweight, being scheduled to fight Lindsey VanZandt at Invicta FC 36 - Sorenson vs. Young. Delboni was once again won by split decision.

Delboni moved back up in weight to strawweight to fight Julia Polastri for the vacant Shooto Brasil strawweight title, at Shooto Brasil 97. Polastri won the fight by a second-round knockout.

Delboni was scheduled to fight the former Invicta Atomweight champion Herica Tiburcio in a strawweight bout, at Invicta FC 42: Cummins vs. Zappitella. Delboni won the fight by unanimous decision.

Her victory against a former champion earned Delboni the right to challenge Alesha Zappitella for the Invicta FC Atomweight Championship at Invicta 44: Rodríguez vs. Torquato. Zappitella won the fight by majority decision. Two of the judges scored the fight 48-47 in Zappitella's favor, while the third judge scored it 48-47 in Delboni's favor. All of the media members scored the fight for Delboni.

Delboni participated in the Invicta FC Phoenix Tournament, which was held to determine the next atomweight title challenger. Delboni won the quarterfinal and semifinal bouts against Tabatha Watkins and Marisa Messer-Belenchia by decision, and faced Lindsey VanZandt in the finals. She beat VanZandt by unanimous decision, with scores of 30-27, 29-28 and 29-28.

==== Invicta FC Atomweight champion ====
Delboni rematched Alesha Zappitella for the Invicta FC Atomweight Championship on January 12, 2022 at Invicta FC 45. She won the bout and the title via unanimous decision, two scorecards of 50–45 and one scorecard of 49–46.

Delboni made her first Invicta Atomweight title defense against Jillian DeCoursey at Invicta FC 49: Delboni vs. DeCoursey on September 28, 2022. She lost the fight by a first-round submission.

=== Post-title reign ===
Delboni was booked to face Danielle Taylor on May 3, 2023, at Invicta FC 53: DeCoursey vs. Dos Santos.

Delboni faced Danielle Taylor at Invicta FC 53 on May 3, 2023, in her return to strawweight. She won the fight by unanimous decision.

== Championships and accomplishments ==
=== Mixed Martial Arts ===
- Invicta Fighting Championships
  - Invicta Phoenix Atomweight Tournament Winner
  - Invicta FC Atomweight Championship (One time)

== Mixed martial arts record ==
Professional record breakdown
18 matches	13 wins	5 losses
By knockout	2	1
By submission	0	1
By decision	11	3

Res.	Record	Opponent	Method	Event	Date	Round	Time	Location	Notes
Loss	13–5	Andrea Amaro	Decision (unanimous)	Fury Challenger Series 13	April 27, 2025	5	5:00	Houston, Texas, United States	For the vacant Fury FC Strawweight Championship.
Win	13–4	Danielle Taylor	Decision (unanimous)	Invicta FC 53	May 3, 2023	3	5:00	Denver, Colorado, United States	Return to Strawweight.
Loss	12–4	Jillian DeCoursey	Submission (rear-naked choke)	Invicta FC 49	September 28, 2022	1	4:49	Hinton, Oklahoma, United States	Lost the Invicta FC Atomweight Championship.
Win	12–3	Alesha Zappitella	Decision (unanimous)	Invicta FC 45	January 12, 2022	5	5:00	Kansas City, Kansas, United States	Won the Invicta FC Atomweight Championship.
Win	11–3	Lindsey VanZandt	Decision (unanimous)	Invicta FC: Phoenix Series 4	June 11, 2021	3	5:00	Kansas City, Kansas, United States	Won the Invicta FC Phoenix Atomweight Tournament.
Loss	10–3	Alesha Zappitella	Decision (split)	Invicta on AXS TV: Rodriguez vs. Torquato	May 21, 2021	5	5:00	Kansas City, Kansas, United States	Return to Atomweight. For the Invicta FC Atomweight Championship.
Win	10–2	Herica Tiburcio	Decision (unanimous)	Invicta FC 42	September 17, 2020	3	5:00	Kansas City, Kansas, United States	
Loss	9–2	Julia Polastri	TKO (punches)	Shooto Brasil 97	October 19, 2019	2	4:35	Rio de Janeiro, Brazil	Return to Strawweight. For the Shooto Brasil Strawweight Championship.
Win	9–1	Lindsey VanZandt	Decision (split)	Invicta FC 36	August 9, 2019	3	5:00	Kansas City, Kansas, United States	
Win	8–1	Maiara Amanajás	Decision (split)	Shooto Brasil 91	April 5, 2019	3	5:00	Rio de Janeiro, Brazil	Strawweight bout.
Loss	7–1	Ashley Cummins	Decision (unanimous)	Invicta FC 32	November 16, 2018	3	5:00	Shawnee, Oklahoma, United States	Atomweight debut.
Win	7–0	Liana Ferreira Pirosin	Decision (unanimous)	Imortal FC 8	April 7, 2018	3	5:00	São José dos Pinhais, Brazil	
Win	6–0	Bruna Brasil	TKO (knee injury)	Maringá Combat 5	November 18, 2017	2	N/A	Maringá, Brazil	
Win	5–0	Pamela Ferreira	TKO (punches)	Brasil Fitness Show: Angels & Fight Contest 2	October 15, 2017	1	3:08	Rio de Janeiro, Brazil	Won the vacant BFS Strawweight Championship.
Win	4–0	Joice Mara	Decision (unanimous)	Shooto Brasil 74	August 27, 2017	3	5:00	Rio de Janeiro, Brazil	
Win	3–0	Bianca Sattelmayer	Decision (unanimous)	Curitiba Top Fight 11	July 1, 2017	3	5:00	Curitiba, Brazil	
Win	2–0	Cristiane Lima	Decision (unanimous)	Rei da CBX 2	August 16, 2015	3	5:00	Salvador, Brazil	
Win	1–0	Juliana Costa	Decision (unanimous)	Haidar Capixaba Combat 12	May 12, 2013	3	5:00	Vitória, Brazil	Strawweight debut.

== See also ==
- List of female mixed martial artists
- List of current Invicta FC fighters

Awards and achievements
Preceded by Alesha Zappitella	7th Invicta FC Atomweight Champion; January 12 – September 28, 2022	Succeeded by Jillian DeCoursey
