= Elise Reed =

American mixed martial artist

Elise Caroline Reed
- Born: December 5, 1992 (age 33); Sacramento, California, United States
- Height: 5 ft 3 in (1.60 m)
- Weight: 115 lb (52 kg; 8 st 3 lb)
- Division: Strawweight
- Reach: 63 in (160 cm)
- Fighting out of: Princeton, New Jersey
- Team: Kickside Martial Arts
- Rank: 4th degree black belt in Taekwondo
- Years active: 2019–present

Mixed martial arts record
- Total: 14
- Wins: 8
- By knockout: 2
- By decision: 6
- Losses: 6
- By knockout: 4
- By submission: 2

Other information
- Mixed martial arts record from Sherdog

Elise Caroline Reed (born December 5, 1992) is an American mixed martial artist who competes in the Strawweight division of the Ultimate Fighting Championship.

== Background ==
Reed started martial arts at six years old by competing in Taekwondo, then moving on to kickboxing at the age of 15. Having her first amateur fight at the age of 20, Reed competed on the amateurs while studying at the Virginia Military Institute. While at the school, Elise partook in Swimming and Water Polo at the NCAA Division I level, becoming the first female RXO at the school. Reed is still in the Army Reserve while owning and operating two schools in New Jersey named Kickside Martial Arts

== Mixed martial arts career ==
=== Early career ===
Reed made her debut at atomweight against Rebecca Bryggman on October 25, 2019, at Bellator 231. She won the bout via TKO stoppage at the end of the first round.

==== Cage Fury Fighting Championships ====
Reed faced Jasmine Jasudavicius for Cage Fury Fighting Championships strawweight title at Cage Fury Fighting Championships 83 on August 13, 2020. She won the fight via technical knockout in round two.

Reed defended her title against Jillian DeCoursey on December 18, 2020, at Cage Fury Fighting Championships 91. She won the fight via unanimous decision.

Reed faced Hilarie Rose on May 29, 2021, at age Fury Fighting Championships 97. She won the fight via technical knockout in round two and retained her title.

=== Ultimate Fighting Championship ===
Reed faced Sijara Eubanks on July 24, 2021, at UFC on ESPN 27. She lost the fight via technical knockout in round one.

Reed faced Cory McKenna on March 19, 2022, at UFC Fight Night 204. She won the fight via split decision.

Reed faced Sam Hughes at UFC Fight Night 206 on May 21, 2022. She lost the via technical knockout in round three.

Reed next replaced Hannah Cifers to face Melissa Martinez at UFC 279 on September 10, 2022. She won the fight via unanimous decision.

Reed was scheduled to face Loma Lookboonmee on February 4, 2023, at UFC Fight Night 218. However, the pair was moved to UFC 284 for undisclosed reasons. She lost the fight via a rear-naked choke submission in the second round.

Reed faced Jinh Yu Frey on June 3, 2023, at UFC on ESPN 46. She won the fight via unanimous decision.

Reed was scheduled to face Cynthia Calvillo at UFC Fight Night 227 on September 16, 2023. However, Calvillo pulled out due to undisclosed reasons and was replaced by Iasmin Lucindo in a catchweight bout of 120 pounds. In turn Lucindo was removed from the event for undisclosed reason and Reed would face Lupita Godinez instead. She lost the fight via a rear-naked choke submission in round two.

Reed faced former Invicta Fighting Championships Atomweight Champion Jessica Penne on October 19, 2024 at UFC Fight Night 245. She won the fight by unanimous decision.

Reed faced Denise Gomes on May 17, 2025 at UFC Fight Night 256. She lost the fight by technical knockout in the second round.

Reed faced Shanelle Dyer on August 22, 2026 at UFC Fight Night 285. She lost the fight via technical knockout in round three.

== Championships and accomplishments ==
- Cage Fury Fighting Championships
  - Cage Fury FC Strawweight Championship (One time)
    - Two successful title defenses

== Mixed martial arts record ==
Professional record breakdown
14 matches	8 wins	6 losses
By knockout	2	4
By submission	0	2
By decision	6	0

Res.	Record	Opponent	Method	Event	Date	Round	Time	Location	Notes
Loss	8–6	Shanelle Dyer	TKO (punches)	UFC Fight Night: Hernandez vs. Rodrigues	August 22, 2026	3	1:42	Sacramento, California, United States	
Loss	8–5	Denise Gomes	TKO (punches)	UFC Fight Night: Burns vs. Morales	May 17, 2025	2	0:30	Las Vegas, Nevada, United States	
Win	8–4	Jessica Penne	Decision (unanimous)	UFC Fight Night: Hernandez vs. Pereira	October 19, 2024	3	5:00	Las Vegas, Nevada, United States	
Loss	7–4	Lupita Godinez	Submission (rear-naked choke)	UFC Fight Night: Grasso vs. Shevchenko 2	September 16, 2023	2	3:30	Las Vegas, Nevada, United States	
Win	7–3	Jinh Yu Frey	Decision (unanimous)	UFC on ESPN: Kara-France vs. Albazi	June 3, 2023	3	5:00	Las Vegas, Nevada, United States	
Loss	6–3	Loma Lookboonmee	Submission (rear-naked choke)	UFC 284	February 12, 2023	2	0:44	Perth, Australia	
Win	6–2	Melissa Martinez	Decision (unanimous)	UFC 279	September 10, 2022	3	5:00	Las Vegas, Nevada, United States	
Loss	5–2	Sam Hughes	TKO (elbow and punches)	UFC Fight Night: Holm vs. Vieira	May 21, 2022	3	3:52	Las Vegas, Nevada, United States	
Win	5–1	Cory McKenna	Decision (split)	UFC Fight Night: Volkov vs. Aspinall	March 19, 2022	3	5:00	London, England	Return to Strawweight.
Loss	4–1	Sijara Eubanks	TKO (punches)	UFC on ESPN: Sandhagen vs. Dillashaw	July 24, 2021	1	3:49	Las Vegas, Nevada, United States	Flyweight debut.
Win	4–0	Hilarie Rose	TKO (elbows)	Cage Fury FC 97	May 29, 2021	2	4:57	Philadelphia, Pennsylvania, United States	Defended the Cage Fury FC Strawweight Championship.
Win	3–0	Jillian DeCoursey	Decision (unanimous)	Cage Fury FC 91	December 18, 2020	4	5:00	Lancaster, Pennsylvania, United States	Defended the Cage Fury FC Strawweight Championship.
Win	2–0	Jasmine Jasudavicius	Decision (split)	Cage Fury FC 83	August 13, 2020	4	5:00	Philadelphia, Pennsylvania, United States	Strawweight debut. Won the vacant Cage Fury FC Strawweight Championship.
Win	1–0	Rebecca Bryggman	TKO (punches)	Bellator 231	October 25, 2019	1	4:48	Uncasville, Connecticut, United States	Atomweight debut.

== See also ==
- List of current UFC fighters
- List of female mixed martial artists
