= Danielle Taylor (fighter) =

American mixed martial arts fighter

- Born: October 25, 1989 (age 36); Lancaster, California, United States
- Other names: Dynamite
- Height: 5 ft 0 in (1.52 m)
- Weight: 115 lb (52 kg; 8 st 3 lb)
- Division: Strawweight; Flyweight
- Reach: 60 in (152 cm)
- Style: Wrestling, Jujutsu, Boxing
- Fighting out of: Van Nuys, California
- Team: Saekson Muay Thai
- Trainer: Julio Trana (Striking Coach); George Garcia (Wrestling Coach)
- Years active: 2013–present

Mixed martial arts record
- Total: 19
- Wins: 11
- By knockout: 3
- By submission: 1
- By decision: 7
- Losses: 8
- By knockout: 2
- By decision: 6

Amateur record
- Total: 5
- Wins: 4
- By knockout: 3
- Losses: 1
- By knockout: 1

Other information
- Occupation: Athlete; Deputy Sheriff
- Mixed martial arts record from Sherdog

Danielle Taylor (born October 25, 1989) is an American mixed martial artist. She was the Strawweight King of the Cage (KOTC) champion (2 times), competed in the Ultimate Fighting Championship (UFC) women's strawweight division and is currently competing for Invicta FC.

== Background ==
=== Personal background ===
Taylor was born in Lancaster, California, United States on October 25, 1989, and she is a full-time Deputy Sheriff for the Los Angeles County Sheriff's Department at the North County Correctional Facility in Castaic, California.

=== MMA background ===
Taylor started training in boxing, when she first got on with the Sheriff's Department in 2010, as she believed she needed to know some self-defense for her job. After struggling to find boxing matches to compete, she moved her focus to MMA, and she began to add wrestling and jiu-jitsu into her training. She was encouraged by her coach to try on MMA competitions and fell in love with the sport, where she fought a total of 5 amateur fights with record of 4 wins and 1 loss, paving the path to her MMA career

She joined King of the Cage (KOTC) promotion for 2 years, from March 2014 to March 2016. She picked up all first five bouts and captured women's strawweight division championship from Glena Avila. However, she did not manage to defend her title against Jamie Colleen, but was able to reclaim the title by TKO from Colleen in the rematch in KOTC: Night of the Champion on 5 March 2016, and soon later she joined Ultimate Fighting Championship (UFC) in 2016.

Despite her small stature, 5 feet 0 inches, she has above average power for the strawweight division. She has the ability to power in with a right hand knockout punch, where she would face fighters who have reach and height over her that can control her from outside and on the clinch.

She does conditioning at Chain Fitness and trains striking at Saekson Muay Thai under Julio Trana.

== Mixed martial arts career ==
=== 2013–2014 ===
She had five amateur fights in both strawweight and flyweight divisions, from May 2013 to January 2014, under KOTC and Tuff-Nuff promotions, with four wins against Lena Hellqvist, Chelsea Lewis, Rachael Smith and Samantha Hester, and one loss to Wendy Julian.

=== King of the Cage ===
==== 2014 ====
Danielle made her professional career debut in the Flyweight division (125 lb) of KOTC, facing Maia Kahaunaele-Stevenson at KOTC: Beaten Path main card, in California, securing a unanimous decision win in 3 round bout.

She was up against Jillian Lybarger on March 26, 2014, on her second fight in Arizona at KOtC: Alliance. The bout was refereed by Mike Beltran. She won by TKO (punches).

Danielle submitted Nikki Lowe with an armbar on round 1 on August 7, 2014, on KOTC: Point of Impact in California.

On her 4th professional fight, she secured a unanimous win decision over Maria Andaverde at KOTC: Battle For The Belt in California.

==== 2015 ====
On 12 February 2015, Taylor was granted a Strawweight Championship fight facing Glena Avila, and stole a split decision win with Herb Dean as the referee on KOTC: Short Fuse and crowned the- KOTC Strawweight champion.

Danielle lost her first title defense five months later to Jamie Colleen, where she was knocked out on August 29, 2017, at KOTC Bitter Rivals in California on round 4.

After her last loss, Taylor made a comeback with a TKO win against Calie Cutler in Las Vegas on KOTC: Sinister Intention event on October 17, 2015, with the record of 6–1–0 in 2016.

==== 2016 ====
Danielle started her 2016 fight on March 5 on KOTC: Night of Champions in California and managed to reclaimed the 15 Ib strawweight title from Jamie Colleen at 5th round with TKO punches.

==== Ultimate Fighting Championship ====
===== 2016 =====
Taylor signed with Ultimate Fighting Championship in 2016 with a 7–1 record.

Taylor made her promotional UFC debut in on August 6, 2016, with 9 days notice at Salt Lake City, US, on UFC Fight Night: Rodríguez vs. Caceres She stepped in for the injured Justine Kish, facing 8th-ranked Maryna Moroz. She suffered a split-decision loss.

In her second bout with UFC she gained a win over South Korea fighter Seo Hee Ham (16-8MMA, 1-3 UFC), at UFC Fight Night: Whittaker vs. Brunson on 26 November 2016 at Melbourne, Australia, with a split-decision (28-29, 30–27, 30–27).

===== 2017 =====
On UFC Fight Night: Swanson vs. Lobov at Nashville, United States Dannielle faced Jessica Penne ( 12-5 MMA, 1-3 UFC) on the preliminary card on 22 April 2017. She secured a win with unanimous decision, outpointing with scores of 29-28 across the board from the judges, where John McCarthy was the referee of the bout.

===== 2018 =====
Taylor faced JJ Aldrich on January 14, 2018, at UFC Fight Night: Stephens vs. Choi. She lost the fight via unanimous decision.

Taylor faced Zhang Weili on August 4, 2018, at UFC 227. She lost the fight by unanimous decision.

On August 30, Taylor was released from the UFC.

=== Post-UFC career ===
After the release from the UFC, Taylor signed with Invicta FC. She made her promotional debut against Montserrat Ruiz at Invicta FC 33 on December 15, 2018. She won the fight via unanimous decision.

She then entered the Invicta Phoenix Series 1 Strawweight tournament, facing Juliana Lima in the quarterfinals. She lost the bout via split decision and was eliminated from the tournament.

In late 2020, Taylor signed with Xtreme Fighting Championships and made her promotional debut against Jessica Aguilar at XFC 43 on November 11, 2020, winning by split decision.

Taylor faced Emily Ducote for the vacant Invicta FC Strawweight Championship at Invicta FC 44: A New Era on August 27, 2021. Her bout with Ducote headlined the first pay-per-view in Invicta FC history. Taylor lost the fight by a first-round knockout. She was first stopped in her tracks with a right straight, before being floored with a head kick.

Taylor faced Liz Tracy at Invicta FC 46 on March 9, 2022. At the weigh-ins, Liz Tracy missed weight for her bout, weighing in at 117.8 pounds, 1.8 pounds over the strawweight non-title fight limit. The bout proceeded at catchweight and Tracy were fined 25 percent of their purses, which went to Taylor. She lost the bout via unanimous decision.

Taylor faced Jéssica Delboni on May 3, 2023, at Invicta FC 53: DeCoursey vs. Dos Santos. She lost the fight by unanimous decision.

== Championships and accomplishments ==
=== Mixed martial arts ===
- King of the Cage (KOTC)
  - KOTC Strawweight Champion (2 times)

== Mixed martial arts record ==
Professional record breakdown
20 matches	11 wins	9 losses
By knockout	3	2
By submission	1	0
By decision	7	7

Res.	Record	Opponent	Method	Event	Date	Round	Time	Location	Notes
Loss	11–9	Jéssica Delboni	Decision (unanimous)	Invicta FC 53	May 3, 2023	3	5:00	Denver, Colorado, United States	
Loss	11–8	Caroline Gallardo	Decision (split)	Combate Global: Romero vs. Ayala	September 30, 2022	3	5:00	Miami, Florida, United States	
Loss	11–7	Liz Tracy	Decision (unanimous)	Invicta FC 46	March 9, 2022	3	5:00	Kansas City, Kansas, United States	Catchweight (117.8 lb) bout; Tracy missed weight.
Loss	11–6	Emily Ducote	KO (punch & head kick)	Invicta FC 44: A New Era	August 27, 2021	1	2:51	Kansas City, Kansas, United States	For the vacant Invicta FC Strawweight Championship.
Win	11–5	Jessica Aguilar	Decision (split)	XFC 43	November 11, 2020	3	5:00	Atlanta, Georgia, United States	
Loss	10–5	Juliana Lima	Decision (split)	Invicta Phoenix Series 1	May 3, 2019	1	5:00	Kansas City, Kansas, United States	Invicta FC Strawweight Tournament Quarterfinal
Win	10–4	Montserrat Ruiz	Decision (unanimous)	Invicta FC 33: Frey vs. Grusander II	December 15, 2018	3	5:00	Kansas City, Missouri, United States	
Loss	9–4	Zhang Weili	Decision (unanimous)	UFC 227	August 4, 2018	3	5:00	Los Angeles, California, United States	
Loss	9–3	JJ Aldrich	Decision (unanimous)	UFC Fight Night: Stephens vs. Choi	January 14, 2018	3	5:00	St. Louis, Missouri, United States	
Win	9–2	Jessica Penne	Decision (unanimous)	UFC Fight Night: Swanson vs. Lobov	April 22, 2017	3	5:00	Nashville, Tennessee, United States	
Win	8–2	Seo Hee Ham	Decision (split)	UFC Fight Night: Whittaker vs. Brunson	November 26, 2016	3	5:00	Melbourne, Australia	
Loss	7–2	Maryna Moroz	Decision (split)	UFC Fight Night: Rodríguez vs. Caceres	August 6, 2016	3	5:00	Salt Lake City, Utah, United States	
Win	7–1	Jamie Colleen	TKO (punches)	KOTC: Night of Champions	March 5, 2016	5	2:15	Ontario, California, United States	Won the KOTC Women's Strawweight Championship.
Win	6–1	Calie Cutler	TKO (punches)	KOTC: Sinister Intentions	October 17, 2015	1	1:58	Las Vegas, Nevada, United States	
Loss	5–1	Jamie Colleen	KO (punch)	KOTC: Bitter Rivals	August 29, 2015	4	1:47	Ontario, California, United States	Lost the KOTC Women's Strawweight Championship.
Win	5–0	Glena Avila	Decision (split)	KOTC: Short Fuse	February 12, 2015	5	5:00	Worley, Idaho, United States	Won the inaugural KOTC Women's Strawweight Championship.
Win	4–0	Maria Andaverde	Decision (unanimous)	KOTC: Battle For The Belt	October 2, 2014	3	5:00	Highland, California, United States	
Win	3–0	Nikki Lowe	Submission (armbar)	KOTC: Point of Impact	August 7, 2014	1	4:22	Highland, California, United States	
Win	2–0	Jillian Lybarger	TKO (punches)	KOTC: Alliance	May 26, 2014	3	1:26	Scottsdale, Arizona, United States	Strawweight debut.
Win	1–0	Maia Kahaunaele-Stevenson	Decision (unanimous)	KOTC: Beaten Path	March 6, 2014	3	5:00	Highland, California, United States	Flyweight debut.

== See also ==
- List of female mixed martial artists
- List of King of the Cage champions
