= Jillian DeCoursey =

American mixed martial artist

- Born: July 26, 1984 (age 42); Queens, New York, U.S.
- Other names: Lionheart
- Height: 5 ft 2 in (157 cm)
- Weight: 105 lb (48 kg; 7 st 7 lb)
- Division: Atomweight
- Reach: 63 in (160 cm)
- Style: BJJ, Kickboxing
- Stance: Orthodox
- Fighting out of: Queens, New York, U.S.
- Team: Ringsport Muay Thai; East Coast United (until 2018); Long Island MMA
- Rank: Black belt in Brazilian jiu-jitsu under Gregg DePasquale
- Years active: 2017–2023

Mixed martial arts record
- Total: 10
- Wins: 6
- By knockout: 2
- By submission: 1
- By decision: 3
- Losses: 4
- By decision: 4

Other information
- University: University of Bridgeport; Hunter College; Iona University
- Mixed martial arts record from Sherdog

Jillian DeCoursey (born July 26, 1984) is an American former mixed martial artist. She competed in the atomweight division of the Invicta FC, where she is a former atomweight champion.

As of November 21, 2022, Sherdog ranks DeCoursey as the #4 atomweight in the world.

== Background ==
DeCoursey was born and grew up in Queens, New York, United States. DeCoursey started undergraduate studies at University of Bridgeport and graduated from Hunter College. She started Jiu-Jitsu after she finished competing in collegiate basketball at Hunter College. She later picked up Muay Thai and eventually transitioned to mixed martial arts.

DeCoursey also eventually finished her postgraduate studies at Iona University, earning a master's degree and owns her counselling practice in mental health.

== Mixed martial arts career ==
=== Early career ===
DeCoursey was signed by Invicta after amassing an amateur record of 8–1. She was an IBJJF brown belt medalist.

=== Invicta Fighting Championships ===
DeCoursey made her promotional debut on August 31, 2017, at Invicta FC 25: Kunitskaya vs. Pa'aluhi against Ashley Medina. She won the fight via split decision.

Her next fight came on March 24, 2018, at Invicta FC 28: Mizuki vs. Jandiroba against Rebekah Levine. She won the fight via unanimous decision.

On July 21, 2018, DeCoursey faced Alesha Zappitella, replacing Shino VanHoose, at Invicta FC 30: Frey vs. Grusander.

For her next fight, DeCoursey fought outside of Invicta, being scheduled to face Katie Perez at CFFC 80. She won the fight by a third-round technical knockout.

DeCoursey returned to Invicta to face Linda Mihalec at Invicta FC 39: Frey vs. Cummins II. DeCoursey won the fight by unanimous decision.

DeCoursey was scheduled to challenge the reigning Cage Fury FC Strawweight champion Elise Reed at CFFC 91. Reed won the fight by unanimous decision.

DeCoursey was scheduled to participate in a one-night Invicta Phoenix Tournament to determine the next atomweight title challenger. DeCoursey lost the quarterfinal bout against Linda Mihalec by split decision.

DeCoursey faced Lindsey VanZandt on May 11, 2022, at Invicta FC 47. She won the bout after knocking out VanZandt in the first round.

==== Invicta FC Atomweight Champion ====
DeCoursey was booked to challenge the reigning Invicta Atomweight champion Jéssica Delboni at Invicta FC 49: Delboni vs. DeCoursey on September 28, 2022. DeCoursey won the fight by a first-round submission.

DeCoursey was scheduled to defend the title against Rayanne dos Santos on May 3, 2023, at Invicta FC 53: DeCoursey vs. Dos Santos. She lost the title fight by unanimous decision.

On January 22, 2026, DeCoursey announced her retirement from MMA competition.

== Professional grappling career ==
DeCoursey was invited to compete in the flyweight division of the Combat Jiu-Jitsu world championship on December 20, 2020. She withdrew from the event.

DeCoursey is scheduled to compete in a superfight at Rise Invitational 11 on April 1, 2023, against Chelsea Mapa. Neither woman was able to secure a submission and the match ended in a draw.

== Championships and accomplishments ==
=== Mixed martial arts ===
- Invicta Fighting Championships
  - Invicta FC Atomweight Championship (One time)

== Mixed martial arts record ==
Professional record breakdown
10 matches	6 wins	4 losses
By knockout	2	0
By submission	1	0
By decision	3	4

Res.	Record	Opponent	Method	Event	Date	Round	Time	Location	Notes
Loss	6–4	Rayanne dos Santos	Decision (unanimous)	Invicta FC 53	May 3, 2023	5	5:00	Denver, Colorado, United States	Lost the Invicta FC Atomweight Championship.
Win	6–3	Jéssica Delboni	Submission (rear-naked choke)	Invicta FC 49	September 28, 2022	1	4:49	Hinton, Oklahoma, United States	Won the Invicta FC Atomweight Championship.
Win	5–3	Lindsey VanZandt	KO (punch)	Invicta FC 47	May 11, 2022	1	1:01	Kansas City, Kansas, United States	Return to Atomweight.
Loss	4–3	Elise Reed	Decision (unanimous)	Cage Fury FC 91	December 18, 2020	4	5:00	Lancaster, Pennsylvania, United States	Strawweight debut. For the vacant Cage Fury FC Strawweight Championship.
Win	4–2	Linda Mihalec	Decision (unanimous)	Invicta FC 39	February 7, 2020	3	5:00	Kansas City, Kansas, United States	
Win	3–2	Katie Perez	TKO (punches)	Cage Fury FC 80	November 22, 2019	3	3:00	Hampton, Virginia, United States	
Loss	2–2	Kelly D'Angelo	Decision (unanimous)	Invicta FC 35	June 7, 2019	3	5:00	Kansas City, Missouri, United States	
Loss	2–1	Alesha Zappitella	Decision (unanimous)	Invicta FC 30	July 21, 2018	3	5:00	Kansas City, Missouri, United States	
Win	2–0	Rebekah Levine	Decision (unanimous)	Invicta FC 28	March 24, 2018	3	5:00	Salt Lake City, Utah, United States	
Win	1–0	Ashley Medina	Decision (split)	Invicta FC 25	August 31, 2017	3	5:00	Lemoore, California, United States	Atomweight debut.

== See also ==
- List of female mixed martial artists

Awards and achievements
Preceded by Jéssica Delboni	8th Invicta FC Atomweight Champion; September 28, 2022 – May 3, 2023	Succeeded by Rayanne dos Santos
