= Alesha Zappitella =

American mixed martial arts (MMA) fighter

- Born: February 28, 1995 (age 31); Conneaut, Ohio, United States
- Other names: Half Pint
- Height: 4 ft 11 in (1.50 m)
- Weight: 105 lb (48 kg; 7 st 7 lb)
- Division: Atomweight (2016–present); Strawweight (2018)
- Style: Wrestling
- Fighting out of: Brighton, Michigan, United States
- Team: Team Scorpion Fighting System (until 2021); Strong Style Fight Team (2021–present); Knoxville Martial Arts Academy (2021–present)
- Rank: Brown belt in Brazilian Jiu Jitsu
- Years active: 2016–present

Mixed martial arts record
- Total: 14
- Wins: 9
- By submission: 2
- By decision: 7
- Losses: 4
- By knockout: 1
- By decision: 3
- No contests: 1

Other information
- Occupation: Paraprofessional educator
- University: King University
- Mixed martial arts record from Sherdog

Alesha Zappitella (born February 28, 1995) is an American mixed martial artist who fights in the Atomweight division of Invicta Fighting Championships, where she is a former Invicta FC Atomweight Champion.

== Background ==
Growing up in Ohio, Alesha started wrestling – as the sole girl in boys' team – at the age of five. She also played softball, but quit it after her coach advised her to drop wrestling in order to focus in the "girl sport" which would get her somewhere. She went on to become a two-time Ohio state champion in girls wrestling, five-time All-American before eventually placing sixth in the 2016 U.S. Olympic Trials.

== Mixed martial arts career ==
=== Invicta ===
==== Early Invicta career ====
Zappitella made her professional debut against Jayme Hinshaw at KOTC Equalizer on 15 October 2016. She won the fight by unanimous decision. She would go on to amass a 3–0 record, with a single no-contest, which earned her the notice of Invicta Fighting Championships. Invicta scheduled her debut against Shino VanHoose at Invicta FC 30: Frey vs. Grusander. VanHoose later withdrew from the bout and was replaced by Jillian DeCoursey. Zappitella won the bout by unanimous decision.

Zappitella was scheduled to fight Amber Brown at Invicta FC 33: Frey vs. Grusander II. She won the fight by unanimous decision.

Zappitella was scheduled to fight Viviane Pereira at Invicta FC 35: Bennett vs. Rodriguez II. Pereira missed the scales, weighing in 0.6 lbs over the atomweight limit. Zappitella lost for the first time in her professional career, as Pereira won the fight by unanimous decision.

Following her first loss, Zappitella briefly left Invicta, being scheduled to fight Kanna Asakura at RIZIN 18. Asakura won the fight by split decision.

Returning to Invicta, Zappitella was scheduled to fight Kelly D'Angelo at Invicta FC 39: Frey vs. Cummins II. Zappitella snapped her two-fight losing streak, winning the bout by unanimous decision.

Zappitella was scheduled to fight Lindsey VanZandt at Invicta FC 40: Ducote vs. Lima. Zappitella won the fight by split decision (28-29, 29–27, 30–27). The majority of media members scored the fight for Zappitella.

==== Invicta Atomweight title reign ====
Zappitella was scheduled to fight Ashley Cummins at Invicta FC 42: Cummins vs. Zappitella for the vacant Invicta FC Atomweight Championship. Cummins was the more dominant party throughout the first two rounds, winning the majority of striking exchanges and stopping Zappitella's takedowns. In the first minute of the third round, Zappitella managed to land an early takedown and countered Cummins' guillotine choke attempt with a Von Flue choke. It was the first Von Flue choke finish in Invicta FC history.

Zappitella made her first title defense against Jéssica Delboni at Invicta 44: Rodríguez vs. Torquato on May 21, 2021. She won the bout by a razor close split decision. Two of the judges scored the fight 48–47 in Zappitella's favor, while the third judge scored it 48–47 in Delboni's favor. All of the media members scored the fight for Delboni.

Zappitella rematched Jéssica Delboni on January 12, 2022, at Invicta FC 45. She lost the bout and the title via unanimous decision, with scores of 50–45, 50–45 and 49–46.

==== Move to strawweight ====
Moving up to Strawweight, Zappitella faced Emily Ducote for the Invicta FC Strawweight Championship on May 11, 2022, at Invicta FC 47. She lost the bout after doctors stopped the bout after the second round due to a cut on her eyelid.

== Personal life ==
Zappitella works as a paraprofessional educator in the Howell Public Schools district. Zappitella also works as a women's self defense coach at the Michigan Institute of Athletics.

She is a player of the collectible strategy card game Magic: The Gathering.

== Championships and accomplishments ==
=== Wrestling ===
- 2012 Vaughn Cadet National Championships Freestyle 105 lbs 3rd Place
- 2013 Vaughn Cadet National Championships Freestyle 105 lbs 5th Place
- 2016 USA Olympic Trials Freestyle 105 lbs Qualifier

=== Mixed Martial Arts ===
- Invicta Fighting Championships
  - Invicta FC Atomweight Championship (one time; former)
    - One successful title defense
  - Performance of the Night (Three times) vs. Jillian DeCoursey, Amber Brown and Ashley Cummins

== Mixed martial arts record ==
Professional record breakdown
14 matches	9 wins	4 losses
By knockout	0	1
By submission	2	0
By decision	7	3
No contests	1	

Res.	Record	Opponent	Method	Event	Date	Round	Time	Location	Notes
Loss	9–4 (1)	Emily Ducote	TKO (doctor stoppage)	Invicta FC 47	May 11, 2022	2	5:00	Kansas City, Kansas, United States	Return to Strawweight. For the Invicta FC Strawweight Championship.
Loss	9–3 (1)	Jéssica Delboni	Decision (unanimous)	Invicta FC 45	January 12, 2022	5	5:00	Kansas City, Kansas, United States	Lost the Invicta FC Atomweight Championship.
Win	9–2 (1)	Jéssica Delboni	Decision (split)	Invicta on AXS TV: Rodriguez vs. Torquato	May 21, 2021	5	5:00	Kansas City, Kansas, United States	Defended the Invicta FC Atomweight Championship.
Win	8–2 (1)	Ashley Cummins	Submission (Von Flue choke)	Invicta FC 42	September 17, 2020	4	1:20	Kansas City, Kansas, United States	Won the vacant Invicta FC Atomweight Championship. Performance of the Night.
Win	7–2 (1)	Lindsey VanZandt	Decision (split)	Invicta FC 40	July 2, 2020	3	5:00	Kansas City, Kansas, United States	
Win	6–2 (1)	Kelly D'Angelo	Decision (unanimous)	Invicta FC 39	February 7, 2020	3	5:00	Kansas City, Kansas, United States	
Loss	5–2 (1)	Kanna Asakura	Decision (split)	Rizin 18	August 18, 2019	3	5:00	Nagoya, Japan	
Loss	5–1 (1)	Viviane Pereira	Decision (unanimous)	Invicta FC 35	June 7, 2019	3	5:00	Kansas City, Kansas, United States	Catchweight (106.7 lb) bout; Pereira missed weight.
Win	5–0 (1)	Amber Brown	Decision (unanimous)	Invicta FC 33	December 15, 2018	3	5:00	Kansas City, Missouri, United States	Performance of the Night.
Win	4–0 (1)	Jillian DeCoursey	Decision (unanimous)	Invicta FC 30	July 21, 2018	3	5:00	Kansas City, Missouri, United States	Return to Atomweight. Performance of the Night.
Win	3–0 (1)	Kyna Sisson	Decision (split)	WXC 71: Night of Champions 10	17 February 2018	3	5:00	Southgate, Michigan, United States	Strawweight debut.
NC	2–0 (1)	Stephanie Alba	NC (overturned)	Combate 13	20 April 2017	3	5:00	Tucson, Arizona, United States	Atomweight bout. Originally a unanimous decision win for Zappitella; overturned after she tested positive for marijuana.
Win	2–0	Ding Miao	Submission (arm-triangle choke)	Kunlun Fight MMA 9	25 February 2017	2	1:17	Sanya, China	Flyweight debut. Won the KLF Flyweight Championship.
Win	1–0	Jayme Hinshaw	Decision (unanimous)	KOTC: Equalizer	15 October 2016	3	5:00	Lac du Flambeau, Wisconsin, United States	Atomweight debut.

Amateur record breakdown		
5 matches	2 wins	2 losses
By knockout	0	1
By submission	1	1
By decision	1	0
Draws	1	

Res.	Record	Opponent	Method	Event	Date	Round	Time	Location	Notes
Win	2–2–1	Jessica Ertl	Submission (Keylock)	NAFC: Super Brawl	30 January 2016	1	2:00	Waukesha, Wisconsin, United States	
Draw	1–2–1	Tiffany Masters	Draw (Decision)	KOTC: Bitter Enemies	5 December 2015	3	3:00	Keshena, Wisconsin, United States	
Loss	1–2	Cynthia Arceo	TKO (Punches)	KOTC: Warriors	8 August 2015	1	0:09	Socorro, Texas, United States	
Loss	1–1	Kyna Sisson	Submission (Triangle choke)	WXC 56: College Throwdown	21 March 2015	2	2:36	Ypsilanti, Michigan, United States	For the WXC Amateur Strawweight Championship.
Win	1–0	Elane Santiago	Decision (Unanimous)	WXC 54: Night of Champions 7	23 January 2015	3	3:00	Southgate, Michigan, United States	

== See also ==
- List of female mixed martial artists
- List of current mixed martial arts champions

Awards and achievements
Preceded by Jinh Yu Frey	6th Invicta FC Atomweight Champion; September 17, 2020 – January 12, 2022	Succeeded by Jéssica Delboni
