= Rayanne dos Santos =

Brazilian mixed martial artist

- Born: Rayanne Amanda dos Santos; 8 June 1995 (age 31); Belém, Brazil
- Height: 5 ft 3 in (1.60 m)
- Weight: 115 lb (52 kg; 8 st 3 lb)
- Division: Atomweight (2022–2023); Strawweight
- Reach: 62 in (157 cm)
- Style: Brazilian jiu-jitsu
- Fighting out of: Belém, Brazil
- Team: Marajó Brothers Team
- Years active: 2015–present

Mixed martial arts record
- Total: 23
- Wins: 14
- By knockout: 2
- By submission: 8
- By decision: 4
- Losses: 9
- By knockout: 1
- By submission: 1
- By decision: 7

Other information
- Mixed martial arts record from Sherdog

Rayanne Amanda dos Santos (born 8 June 1995) is a Brazilian mixed martial artist, currently competing in the strawweight division of the Ultimate Fighting Championship (UFC). She also fought in Invicta FC, where she was the atomweight champion.

== Background ==
Amanda comes from a jiu-jitsu family, with her parents and brothers all being black belts. Training since she was seven years old, Rayanne went beyond the sport and ended up migrating to MMA. Amanda has a degree in social work, running a social project for children in Brazil, but had to close it to focus on MMA. After training in Brazil most of her life, Amanda moved to Houston to live with her fiancee, fellow MMA fighter Kolton Englund.

== Mixed martial arts career ==
=== Early career ===
Dos Santos started her professional MMA career in 2015 and mainly fought in Brazil and Canada. She amassed a record of 12–6 prior to being signed by Invicta.

Amanda was scheduled to fight Edna Oliveira Ajala at Shooto Brasil 101. She won the fight by unanimous decision.

Amanda was next scheduled to fight Maiara Amanajas dos Santos at Shooto Brasil 106. She won the fight by unanimous decision.

Amanda faced Denise Gomes at Dana White's Contender Series 51 on August 23, 2022. She lost the fight via unanimous decision.

=== Invicta FC ===
In her Invicta debut, dos Santos faced Katie Saull at Invicta FC 51 on January 18, 2023. She won the fight via unanimous decision.

==== Atomweight Champion ====
Dos Santos faced the reigning atomweight champion Jillian DeCoursey on May 3, 2023, at Invicta FC 53: DeCoursey vs. Dos Santos. She won the title fight by unanimous decision to win the atomweight championship.

=== Ultimate Fighting Championship ===
On October 17. 2023, it was announced that dos Santos had signed with the UFC and would compete at Strawweight.

dos Santos faced Talita Alencar on December 9, 2023 at UFC Fight Night: Song vs. Gutiérrez. She lost the fight via split decision.

dos Santos faced Puja Tomar on June 8, 2024, at UFC on ESPN 57. She lost the fight by split decision. 11 out of 11 media outlets scored the bout for dos Santos.

dos Santos was scheduled to face Alice Ardelean on October 19, 2024 at UFC Fight Night 245. However, Santos withdrew from the bout due to a broken arm. The bout was later rescheduled for May 31, 2025 and took place at UFC on ESPN 68. She lost the fight by unanimous decision. This fight earned her a Fight of the Night award.

== Championships and accomplishments ==
=== Mixed martial arts ===
- Ultimate Fighting Championship
  - Fight of the Night (One time) vs. Alice Ardelean
- Invicta Fighting Championships
  - Invicta FC Atomweight Championship (One time)
- BTC Fight Promotions
  - BTC Women's Strawweight Championship (One time)

== Mixed martial arts record ==
Professional record breakdown
23 matches	14 wins	9 losses
By knockout	2	1
By submission	8	1
By decision	4	7

Res.	Record	Opponent	Method	Event	Date	Round	Time	Location	Notes
Loss	14–9	Alice Ardelean	Decision (unanimous)	UFC on ESPN: Gamrot vs. Klein	May 31, 2025	3	5:00	Las Vegas, Nevada, United States	Fight of the Night.
Loss	14–8	Puja Tomar	Decision (split)	UFC on ESPN: Cannonier vs. Imavov	June 8, 2024	3	5:00	Louisville, Kentucky, United States	
Loss	14–7	Talita Alencar	Decision (split)	UFC Fight Night: Song vs. Gutiérrez	December 9, 2023	3	5:00	Las Vegas, Nevada, United States	Return to Strawweight.
Win	14–6	Jillian DeCoursey	Decision (unanimous)	Invicta FC 53	May 3, 2023	5	5:00	Denver, Colorado, United States	Won the Invicta FC Atomweight Championship.
Win	13–6	Katie Saull	Decision (unanimous)	Invicta FC 51	January 18, 2023	3	5:00	Denver, Colorado, United States	Atomweight debut.
Win	12–6	Vitoria Karolina	Technical Submission (armbar)	Mag Fight 01	October 14, 2022	1	1:57	Magalhães Barata, Brazil	Flyweight bout.
Loss	11–6	Denise Gomes	Decision (unanimous)	Dana White's Contender Series 51	August 27, 2022	3	5:00	Las Vegas, Nevada, United States	
Win	11–5	Jucilene Cabra	Submission (armbar)	Benevides Combat 2	February 26, 2022	1	4:09	Benevides, Brazil	
Win	10–5	Fabiola Barroso	KO (punches)	Benevides Combat 1	December 18, 2021	2	2:28	Benevides, Brazil	Return to Strawweight.
Win	9–5	Luciana Santos	Submission (armbar)	Maximum Impacto Fight 14	October 30, 2021	1	4:50	Salinópolis, Brazil	Flyweight debut.
Win	8–5	Daniela Ribeiro	Submission (armbar)	Azevedo Fight Combat 01	October 16, 2021	1	3:48	Vizeu, Brazil	
Loss	7–5	Alexia Thainara	Submission (rear-naked choke)	Arena Global 12	June 4, 2021	2	4:48	Rio de Janeiro, Brazil	For the vacant AG Women's Strawweight Championship.
Win	7–4	Alexia Santana	Submission (armbar)	Ipixuna Fight Champions 12	May 8, 2021	1	0:20	Ipixuna do Pará, Brazil	
Win	6–4	Maiara Amanajas dos Santos	Decision (unanimous)	Shooto Brasil 106	December 13, 2020	3	5:00	Rio de Janeiro, Brazil	
Loss	5–4	Edna Oliveira Alaja	Decision (unanimous)	Shooto Brasil 101	September 27, 2020	3	5:00	Rio de Janeiro, Brazil	
Loss	5–3	Isabela de Padua	TKO (retirement)	Standout Fighting Tournament 17	October 26, 2019	2	0:00	São Paulo, Brazil	
Win	5–2	Shirley Duarte	Decision (unanimous)	Sombra Fight Champions 13	August 29, 2019	3	5:00	Belém, Brazil	Catchweight (121 lb) bout.
Win	4–2	Lindsay Garbatt	Submission (armbar)	BTC 4	November 24, 2018	1	1:50	Peterborough, Ontario, Canada	Won the inaugural BTC Women's Strawweight Championship.
Win	3–2	Tatiane Ramos	Submission (armbar)	Sombra Fight Champions 8	August 16, 2018	1	0:36	Belém, Brazil	
Loss	2–2	Lindsay Garbatt	Decision (majority)	BTC 3	June 23, 2018	3	5:00	Burlington, Ontario, Canada	
Loss	2–1	Naizi Cantanhede	Decision (split)	Sombra Fight Champions 6	January 18, 2018	3	5:00	Belém, Brazil	
Win	2–0	Leide Carvalho	Submission (rear naked choke)	Sombra Fight Champions 5	October 25, 2017	1	2:25	Belém, Brazil	
Win	1–0	Jessica Cunha	TKO (body kick and punches)	REC Combat 5	December 5, 2015	2	4:36	Vigia, Brazil	Strawweight debut.

== See also ==
- List of current UFC fighters
- List of female mixed martial artists

Awards and achievements
Preceded by Jillian DeCoursey	9th Invicta FC Atomweight Champion; May 3, 2023 – October 17, 2023	Succeeded by Vacant
