= Emily Ducote =

American mixed martial arts (MMA) fighter

- Born: January 1, 1994 (age 32); Los Angeles, California, United States
- Other names: Gordinha
- Height: 157 cm (5 ft 2 in)
- Weight: 115 lb (52 kg; 8 st 3 lb)
- Division: Strawweight
- Stance: Orthodox
- Fighting out of: Oklahoma City, Oklahoma, United States
- Team: American Top Team Oklahoma
- Rank: Black belt in Brazilian Jiu-Jitsu; Black belt in Taekwondo
- Years active: 2015–present

Mixed martial arts record
- Total: 24
- Wins: 15
- By knockout: 4
- By submission: 5
- By decision: 6
- Losses: 9
- By submission: 1
- By decision: 8

Other information
- Mixed martial arts record from Sherdog

Emily Ducote (born January 1, 1994) is an American mixed martial artist who competed in the strawweight division of the Ultimate Fighting Championship (UFC). She previously competed in Invicta FC, where she was the Invicta FC Strawweight Champion.

== Background ==
The daughter of John Ducote and Yvette Bradstreet, Emily was born in Los Angeles, California. Ducote is a Taekwondo Black Belt, first beginning her training in the art at age twelve at her grandparents' recommendation. She wrestled for Los Gatos High School, ending as a runner-up in state championships in her senior year. With an aspiration to wrestle in the best college team, she moved to the Great Plains in 2012 to study kinesiology at Oklahoma City University. She started training Brazilian Jiu-Jitsu in 2013 and was promoted to black belt in May 2022.

== Mixed martial arts career ==
=== Bellator ===
Ducote was scheduled to make her Bellator debut against Bruna Vargas at Bellator 159 on July 22, 2016. She won the fight by a second-round rear-naked choke submission.

Ducote was scheduled to face Kenya Miranda at Bellator 161 on September 16, 2016. She won the fight by a second-round armbar submission.

Ducote was scheduled to face Ilima-Lei Macfarlane at Bellator 167 on December 3, 2016. Macfarlane won the fight by unanimous decision, with scores of 30-27, 29-28, 29-28.

Ducote was scheduled to face Katy Collins at Bellator 174 on March 3, 2017. She won the fight by a first-round rear-naked choke submission.

Ducote was scheduled to face Jessica Middleton at Bellator 181 on July 14, 2017. She won the fight by unanimous decision, with scores of 29-27, 29-28, 29-28.

Ducote was scheduled to face Ilima-Lei Macfarlane for the inaugural Bellator Women's Flyweight World Championship at Bellator 186 on November 3, 2017. Macfarlane won the fight by a fifth-round armbar submission.

Ducote was scheduled to face Kristina Williams at Bellator 196 on March 2, 2018. Williams won the fight by split decision in a fight where Ducote was dominant and most part of the media called it a controversial decision. Two of the judges scored the fight 29-28 for Williams, while the third judge scored the fight 30-27 for Ducote.

Ducote was scheduled to face Veta Arteaga at Bellator 202 on July 13, 2018. Arteaga won the fight by unanimous decision, extending Ducote's losing streak to three fights.

After she was released by Bellator, Ducote moved down to strawweight for her next bout against Kathryn Paprocki at Xtreme Fight Night 356 on February 1, 2019. She won the fight by a third-round rear-naked choke submission.

=== Invicta FC ===
Ducote was scheduled to make her promotional debut against Janaisa Morandin at Invicta FC 38: Murata vs. Ducote on August 9, 2019. Morandin weighed in three pounds over the strawweight limit, at 119 lbs. Ducote won the fight by a first-round knockout.

In her second promotional appearance, Ducote was scheduled to face Kanako Murata for the vacant Invicta FC Strawweight Championship in the main event of Invicta FC 38: Murata vs. Ducote on November 1, 2019. Murata won the fight by split decision, with two judges scoring the bout 48-47 and 49-46 in her favor. The third judge scored the fight 48-47 for Ducote.

Ducote was scheduled to face Juliana Lima in the main event of Invicta FC 40: Ducote vs. Lima on July 2, 2020. She won the fight by unanimous decision, with all three judges awarding her a 29-28 scorecard.

Ducote was scheduled to face Montserrat Ruiz at Invicta FC 43: King vs. Harrison on November 20, 2020. The fight was later cancelled due to “enhanced COVID-19 safety protocols”.

Ducote was scheduled to face Liz Tracy at Invicta FC on AXS TV: Rodríguez vs. Torquato on May 21, 2021. The fight was later cancelled.

==== Invicta FC Strawweight Champion ====
Ducote faced UFC veteran Danielle Taylor for the vacant Invicta FC Strawweight Championship at Invicta FC 44: A New Era on August 27, 2021. Her bout with Taylor headlined the first pay-per-view in Invicta FC history. Ducote won the fight by a first-round knockout. She first stopped Taylor in her tracks with a right straight, before flooring her with a head kick.

In her first title defence, Ducote faced Alesha Zappitella on May 11, 2022 at Invicta FC 47. She won the bout after doctor's stopped the bout after the second round due to a cut on Alesha's eyelid.

=== Ultimate Fighting Championship ===
In June 2022, Ducote signed with the UFC.

Ducote made her promotional debut, replacing Brianna Fortino, against Jessica Penne on July 16, 2022 at UFC on ABC 3. She won the fight via unanimous decision.

Ducote faced Angela Hill on December 3, 2022 at UFC on ESPN 42. She lost the bout via unanimous decision.

Ducote was scheduled to face Polyana Viana on April 29, 2023, at UFC on ESPN 45. However, the bout was rescheduled for UFC Fight Night 223 on May 20, 2023. In turn, Viana withdrew from the bout due to undisclosed reason and was replaced by former LFA Women's Strawweight Champion Lupita Godinez at a catchweight of 120 pounds. She lost the fight via unanimous decision.

Ducote faced Ashley Yoder on October 14, 2023 at UFC Fight Night 230. She won the fight via unanimous decision.

Ducote faced Vanessa Demopoulos on May 18, 2024, at UFC Fight Night 241. She lost the fight by split decision.

On July 30, 2024, it was reported that Ducote was removed from the UFC roster.

=== Post-UFC Career ===
Ducote made her return to Invicta in the main event of Invicta FC 58 against Yulia Ostroverkhova on November 6, 2024. She would win the fight via submission in the second round with an armbar.

== Championships and accomplishments ==
- Invicta Fighting Championships
  - Invicta FC Strawweight Championship (One time)
    - One successful title defense

== Mixed martial arts record ==
Professional record breakdown
24 matches	15 wins	9 losses
By knockout	4	0
By submission	5	1
By decision	6	8

Res.	Record	Opponent	Method	Event	Date	Round	Time	Location	Notes
Win	15–9	Thaiane Souza	KO (punch)	Invicta FC 61	April 4, 2025	1	2:29	Shawnee, Oklahoma, United States	Catchweight (120 lb) bout; Souza missed weight (124.3 lb).
Win	14–9	Yulia Ostroverkhova	Submission (armbar)	Invicta FC 58	November 6, 2024	2	3:53	Kansas City, Kansas, United States	
Loss	13–9	Vanessa Demopoulos	Decision (split)	UFC Fight Night: Barboza vs. Murphy	May 18, 2024	3	5:00	Las Vegas, Nevada, United States	
Win	13–8	Ashley Yoder	Decision (unanimous)	UFC Fight Night: Yusuff vs. Barboza	October 14, 2023	3	5:00	Las Vegas, Nevada, United States	
Loss	12–8	Lupita Godinez	Decision (unanimous)	UFC Fight Night: Dern vs. Hill	May 20, 2023	3	5:00	Las Vegas, Nevada, United States	Catchweight (120 lb) bout.
Loss	12–7	Angela Hill	Decision (unanimous)	UFC on ESPN: Thompson vs. Holland	December 3, 2022	3	5:00	Orlando, Florida, United States	
Win	12–6	Jessica Penne	Decision (unanimous)	UFC on ABC: Ortega vs. Rodríguez	July 16, 2022	3	5:00	Elmont, New York, United States	
Win	11–6	Alesha Zappitella	TKO (doctor stoppage)	Invicta FC 47	May 11, 2022	2	5:00	Kansas City, Kansas, United States	Defended the Invicta FC Strawweight Championship.
Win	10–6	Danielle Taylor	KO (punch and head kick)	Invicta FC 44	August 27, 2021	1	2:51	Kansas City, Kansas, United States	Won the vacant Invicta FC Strawweight Championship. Performance of the Night.
Win	9–6	Juliana Lima	Decision (unanimous)	Invicta FC 40	July 2, 2020	3	5:00	Kansas City, Kansas, United States	Performance of the Night.
Loss	8–6	Kanako Murata	Decision (split)	Invicta FC 38	November 1, 2019	5	5:00	Kansas City, Kansas, United States	For the vacant Invicta FC Strawweight Championship.
Win	8–5	Janaisa Morandin	KO (punches)	Invicta FC 36	August 9, 2019	1	4:03	Kansas City, Kansas, United States	Catchweight (119.6 lb) bout; Morandin missed weight. Performance of the Night.
Win	7–5	Kathryn Paprocki	Submission (rear-naked choke)	Xtreme Fight Night 356	February 1, 2019	3	3:31	Tulsa, Oklahoma, United States	Return to Strawweight.
Loss	6–5	Veta Arteaga	Decision (unanimous)	Bellator 202	July 13, 2018	3	5:00	Thackerville, Oklahoma, United States	
Loss	6–4	Kristina Williams	Decision (split)	Bellator 196	March 2, 2018	3	5:00	Thackerville, Oklahoma, United States	
Loss	6–3	Ilima-Lei Macfarlane	Submission (triangle armbar)	Bellator 186	November 3, 2017	5	3:42	University Park, Pennsylvania, United States	For the inaugural Bellator Women's Flyweight World Championship.
Win	6–2	Jessica Middleton	Decision (unanimous)	Bellator 181	July 14, 2017	3	5:00	Thackerville, Oklahoma, United States	
Win	5–2	Katy Collins	Submission (rear-naked choke)	Bellator 174	March 3, 2017	1	4:53	Thackerville, Oklahoma, United States	
Loss	4–2	Ilima-Lei Macfarlane	Decision (unanimous)	Bellator 167	December 3, 2016	3	5:00	Thackerville, Oklahoma, United States	
Win	4–1	Kenya Miranda	Submission (armbar)	Bellator 161	September 16, 2016	2	4:37	Cedar Park, Texas, United States	Catchweight (126.8 lb) bout; Miranda missed weight.
Win	3–1	Bruna Vargas	Submission (rear-naked choke)	Bellator 159	July 22, 2016	2	0:29	Mulvane, Kansas, United States	Flyweight debut.
Win	2–1	Jianna Denizard	Decision (unanimous)	Xtreme Fight Night 29	May 14, 2016	5	3:00	Tulsa, Oklahoma, United States	Won the vacant XFN Strawweight Championship.
Win	1–1	Ronnie Nanney	Decision (unanimous)	OKC: Charity Fight Night 2016	January 14, 2016	5	3:00	Oklahoma City, Oklahoma, United States	Won the OKC Strawweight Championship.
Loss	0–1	Emily Whitmire	Decision (unanimous)	Freestyle Cage Fighting 50	September 15, 2015	3	5:00	Shawnee, Oklahoma, United States	Strawweight debut.

== See also ==
- List of female mixed martial artists
- List of current mixed martial arts champions

Awards and achievements
Preceded by Kanako Murata	8th Invicta FC Strawweight Champion; August 27, 2021 – June 2, 2022	Succeeded by Valesca Machado
