= The Ultimate Fighter: A Champion Will Be Crowned =

UFC mixed martial arts television series and event in 2014

- Genre: Reality, Sports
- Created by: Frank Fertitta III, Lorenzo Fertitta, Dana White
- Starring: Dana White, Anthony Pettis, and Gilbert Melendez
- Country of origin: United States

Production
- Running time: 60 minutes

Original release
- Network: Fox Sports 1
- Release: September 10 – December 10, 2014

The Ultimate Fighter: A Champion Will Be Crowned (also known as The Ultimate Fighter 20) is the twentieth installment of the Ultimate Fighting Championship (UFC)-produced reality television series The Ultimate Fighter. This season is the first to feature only female fighters and was used to determine the first UFC Women's Strawweight Champion.

The series was officially announced by the UFC in December 2013. The coaches were announced in February 2014 after Gilbert Melendez re-signed with the UFC and stated he would coach opposite the current UFC Lightweight Champion, Anthony Pettis. This move drew criticism from MMA critics and fans, as some felt it was establishing a significant delay in Pettis' first title defense.

This season aired on Fox Sports 1.

== Cast ==
=== Coaches ===
Team Pettis

- Anthony Pettis, Head Coach
- Duke Roufus
- Daniel Wanderley
- Sergio Pettis
- Scott Cushman

Team Melendez

- Gilbert Melendez, Head Coach
- Jake Shields
- Anucha Chayaisen
- Nate Diaz
- Josh Berkovic

=== Fighters ===
Eleven fighters were initially announced as already having been cast for the show in December 2013; however, Cláudia Gadelha, Juliana Lima, and Paige VanZant were eventually removed from the cast due to being unable to stay on weight throughout the program, not speaking English, and being too young, respectively. They got a direct contract with the UFC despite their removal from The Ultimate Fighter. Auditions were held in April 2014 to find the remaining eight contestants. The eight remaining fighters were announced on July 3, 2014.

- Team Pettis
  - Carla Esparza, Randa Markos, Joanne Calderwood, Alex Chambers, Jessica Penne, Felice Herrig, Justine Kish, Aisling Daly.
- Team Melendez
  - Angela Hill, Tecia Torres, Emily Kagan, Rose Namajunas, Lisa Ellis, Heather Jo Clark, Bec Rawlings, Angela Magaña.

== Episodes ==
Episode 1: For The Belt (September 10, 2014)

- Dana White acquired 11 strawweight female fighters from Invicta Fighting Championships, an all-women's American MMA organization, with 8 fighters competing on TUF while the remaining 8 auditioned for the show when try outs were held at The Palace Station Hotel and Casino in Las Vegas.
- All 16 female fighters prepare to compete for the UFC's new 115-pound Strawweight division title and will be crowned the champion.
- Both coaches split the women into two groups of eight to see what their strengths and weaknesses are during practice. Also, Melendez and Pettis will rank the women according to how well they train with them.
- The coaches had different evaluation styles: Melendez preferred to get to know the women one-on-one by asking them questions and asked them to do some striking drills in the cage. While Pettis straight out asked the women what team they wanted to be on and then ran them through fitness drills and aggressive grappling on the mat.
- The fighters are divided in two teams and are individually seeded or ranked and a coin was flipped (purple for Melendez, teal for Pettis). Pettis won the coin toss and chose to pick the first fighter and Melendez will pick the first fight.
- Since the fighters have been seeded by the UFC for the tournament (which was unknown to the coaches), as a coach makes a pick, the corresponding fighter based on seed will go to the other coach (e.g., if the #1 seeded fighter is picked by a coach, the #16 seeded fighter will go to the other coach).
- The eight coaches' picks (and corresponding seed sent to the other team):

Carla Esparza – Ranked #1 (Team Pettis – first pick)
Angela Hill – Ranked #16 (Team Melendez)

Tecia Torres – Ranked #3 (Team Melendez – second pick)
Randa Markos – Ranked #14 (Team Pettis)

Joanne Calderwood – Ranked #2 (Team Pettis – third pick)
Emily Kagan – Ranked #15 (Team Melendez)

- After this pick, an onscreen bracket graphic shows Randa Markos in a quarterfinal spot, prematurely revealing the first fight result.

Rose Namajunas – Ranked #7 (Team Melendez – fourth pick)
Alex Chambers – Ranked #10 (Team Pettis)

Jessica Penne – Ranked #4 (Team Pettis – fifth pick)
Lisa Ellis – Ranked #13 (Team Melendez)

Heather Jo Clark – Ranked #11 (Team Melendez – sixth pick)
Felice Herrig – Ranked #6 (Team Pettis)

Justine Kish – Ranked #9 (Team Pettis – seventh pick)
Bec Rawlings – Ranked #8 (Team Melendez)

Angela Magana – Ranked #12 (Team Melendez – eight pick)
Aisling Daly – Ranked #5 (Team Pettis)

- White explains that there are two performance bonuses of $25,000 each and the two fighters who are involved in the best fight of the season will also get $25,000 apiece. The fighter who wins this season of TUF will not only become the world champion, but will win a brand new Harley Davidson motorcycle.
- Melendez announces the first fight: #3 Tecia Torres vs. #14 Randa Markos.
- The fighters move into the TUF house and pick their rooms. Later, they start their first team practices.
- Some of the fighters, especially Torres and Markos, share their personal stories.
- Randa Markos defeated Tecia Torres via unanimous decision after three rounds.
- Pettis picked the next match up and matched Calderwood against Kagan.

Episode 2: We All Came Here to Fight! (September 17, 2014)

- Pettis and his assistant coaches pay a visit to the TUF house to celebrate Randa Markos' win with fast food. Herrig makes a friendship bracelet for Pettis' younger brother, UFC fighter Sergio Pettis, as the ladies tease her for having a small crush on him.
- Jessica Penne gets frustrated for being stopped in the middle of training to be critiqued and brings it to Pettis' attention. The rest of the teal team also feels like they are getting "over-coached" by the assistant coaches as they are nitpicking their techniques way too much.
- Heather Jo Clark's constant whining and complaining is getting on the nerves of Team Melendez, who see her as wanting to be the "ringleader" of the group. Rose Namajunas does not see eye-to-eye with Clark's demands and during grappling practice, they accidentally butted heads while rolling on the mat, leaving Namajunas' eye bruised and Clark needing stitches.
- Felice Herrig calls a team meeting with Pettis and the assistant coaches and speaks for the ladies about them feeling overwhelmed and stopping their drills to run another drill; it is an "information overload." Pettis assures he and his staff are passionate about training them and have their best interests at heart.
- Joanne Calderwood defeated Emily Kagan via majority decision after two rounds.
- Pettis picked the next match up: #4 Jessica Penne vs. #13 Lisa Ellis. Dana White stated that Jessica "beat the living shit" out of Lisa when they previously fought. Pettis noted that it was one of the bloodiest fights in women's MMA history.

Episode 3: Don't Fight Fate (September 24, 2014)

- Bec Rawlings gets called in to Dana White's office and receives the news that her stepfather died from Parkinson's disease. Angela Magana leads the rest of the team in a prayer for Rawlings.
- Melendez and his assistant coaches (especially Jake Shields, who can relate since he lost his own father leading up to a fight) bring flowers to Rawlings at the TUF house to comfort her.
- Heather Jo Clark is feeling more like an outcast when her team ignores her annoying ways while playing a trivia game.
- Team Melendez is worried that Ellis' heart is not confident going into her rematch with Penne since it was her first fight in two years since her pregnancy. Plus, she misses her 1-year-old daughter back at home.
- In answer to Team Pettis' "panty wall" in their locker room, the ladies on the purple team pull their first prank when they take a pair of oversize "granny panties" to add to the collection. Penne and the rest of the team do not take kindly to the new addition and stretch the panties on Melendez's portrait, which he takes lightly and is amused by.
- Jessica Penne defeated Lisa Ellis via submission (rear naked choke) at 1:14 in round 1.
- White commented that Penne had her back, and there was no doubt, in his mind, that Ellis gave up that choke because she wanted out of the fight.
- Still in control of the picks, Pettis chose the next match up: #1 Carla Esparza vs. #16 Angela Hill.

Episode 4: Make A Big Strike (October 1, 2014)

- Former World Extreme Cagefighting featherweight champion, Urijah Faber, steps in as Team Pettis' temporary coach for the day due to Pettis having a prior engagement, making the ladies "crush" on him during wrestling practice.
- Angela Hill's comedic actions are heightened when she "gas attacks" her teammates at the TUF house.
- Justine Kish, who only fought in the strawweight division once before, struggles with her weight and hopes her team keeps on winning to help lose the weight, giving her more time.
- After Heather Jo Clark hyperextends her knee during practice, she complains about it so much her teammates lash out, especially Angela Magana who has had it with her attitude.
- Having not fought in a year and a half, former Invicta Strawweight Champion, Carla Esparza, is worried about "ring rust" against her upcoming fight with Hill.
- Carla Esparza defeated Angela Hill via submission (standing rear naked choke) at 1:18 in round 1.
- Winning four fights in a row and still in control, Pettis matches #6 Felice Herrig against #11 Clark.

Episode 5: Coming To Get You (October 22, 2014)

- When Melendez calls a team meeting, his team turns on Clark after she constantly complains about her injuries, and how she only wants to train with the coaches and not with them.
- After hurting her knee in a previous practice, Justine Kish receives some bad news from the doctor—she has a torn ACL injury, and she is advised to have reconstructive surgery. She won't be able to continue to compete for the Strawweight title.
- White gives #3 ranked Tecia Torres, who lost her match with Randa Markos, a second chance and has her change to Team Pettis to fight former teammate Bec Rawlings. Melendez disagreed with White because he spent time coaching her and thought a "bye" was in order for Rawlings.
- The switch is much to the disappointment of Team Pettis who doubt that Torres deserved another chance since she lost her fight unanimously, and they refuse to train with her.
- Two days before her fight, Herrig feels the pressure to win because her team is 4–0, since nobody from Team Melendez likes Clark, and does not want to let everyone down. Yet, she has no idea where all the "bad blood" came from with her and Clark in the first place.
- Felice Herrig defeated Heather Jo Clark via unanimous decision in 2 rounds.
- After the fight, Clark said she did some "soul-searching" and apologized to Herrig, saying she was not going to judge her anymore, squashing their feud.
- With his team winning five fights in a row and maintaining control, Pettis picked the next match up: #5 Aisling Daly vs. #12 Angela Magana.

Episode 6: Give It All You Have (October 29, 2014)

- Angela Magana shares details about her difficult childhood with Rose Namajunas, saying "I was born addicted to heroin, and I had to fight just to survive my first few weeks of life. My parents were drug addicts; my mom was a drug addict. I was grazed by the same bullet that shot my mother in the neck. She was so high I had to tell her she was high. I've eaten out of trash cans. I was there when my mom had to prostitute just to make money."
- Tecia Torres continues to struggle to get along with her new teammates, however a few come around, including Alex Chambers.
- After throwing up the night before, possibly due to heat exhaustion, Daly took the day off of training due to sickness and ability of adjusting to the Las Vegas heat, but is not looking for a way out of her fight. Daly also mentions that she was recently diagnosed with anxiety and depression. She expresses difficulties with depression and the fact that she takes medication to deal with it.
- White later calls Daly into his office at the gym to let her know that she has support if needed.
- At the TUF house, both teams watch UFC Fight Night: McGregor vs. Brandao in Daly's home country of Ireland. Knowing that she is on the show, Daly's Dublin training partner and flyweight fighter Patrick Holohan dedicates his win to her after his first fight in the UFC, and she is motivated to win her fight.
- Magana shares more about her rough past, saying that before she became a fighter, she had fallen three and a half stories off an apartment balcony and broke her back in two places. Soon after, she had recovered from her accident, she met her soul mate who died unexpectedly one day after they were engaged. Then, Magana was in a brief coma after an accident that nearly ended her fighting career.
- Aisling Daly defeated Angela Magana via TKO (punches) at 2:34 in round 3.
- There was a bit of controversy due to the fact that in the first round, the referee Chris Tognoni stood Magana up after two warnings of inactivity while she had Daly's back.
- Team Pettis improves to 6–0 and retains control of the fight pick, and selects the next match up: #10 Alex Chambers vs. #7 Rose Namajunas.

Episode 7: Risk It All (November 5, 2014)

- Team Melendez's losing streak is creating some tension with the women coming together as a team and it creates a total divide. So, Angela Magana and Bec Rawlings start talking behind Lisa Ellis' back because she and Heather Jo Clark have been hanging out with Team Pettis, who Rawlings calls "The Foreigners" at the TUF house.
- Along with Namajunas, Angela Hill and Emily Kagan, Magana and Rawlings start calling themselves "The Skrapettes" because they have been trained by the "Skrap Pack" since day one, unlike Ellis and Clark who have been hurt after their fights and Tecia Torres gone to Team Pettis. Magana calls them "The Chumpettes."
- Melendez invited Kron Gracie to help Rose with her jiu-jitsu. After her training session with Gracie, Rose feels the pressure of getting Team Melendez their first win and breaks down in front of Gracie, but she gets her much needed frustration out.
- Chambers opens up about her life in Australia and how her parents do not share her mixed martial arts dream, and says she has a background in astrophysics and engineering.
- Meanwhile, Namajunas shares her secret of how she grew up with violence and sexual abuse, which goes with earning her nickname "Thug", but her fiancée, former UFC heavyweight and K-1 kickboxer Pat Barry has helped her through her past problems.
- Since Team Pettis is 6–0, the women know they have to fight each other soon and some don't want to train with their future opponents, including Carla Esparza who has shunned certain teammates to train with.
- The test results of Heather's MRI on her knee is back and the diagnosis is a full ACL tear, making her teammates quickly realize she wasn’t "faking" her injury after her fight. Even Magana gets Clark aside to apologize for her harsh comments.
- Megan Rapinoe and Sydney Leroux, two key members of the United States women's national soccer team visit the fighters and throws a few kicks with them at the gym.
- Rose Namajunas defeated Alex Chambers via submission (rear-naked choke) at 0:22 in round 1.
- After the fight, Melendez said that this fight was the "most dominating and most professional victory, maybe next to Esparza's, who had a good fight, but nothing pretty like Rose's."
- With Team Melendez in control for the first time, there was only one match up left: #3 Tecia Torres vs. #8 Bec Rawlings.

Episode 8: Skrapettes (November 12, 2014)

- The "Skrapettes" call the first official team meeting to discuss how to kick the "Chumpettes" (Tecia Torres and Heather Jo Clark) out of Team Melendez's room and move into "Chumpette" Lisa Ellis' room. They designate Emily Kagan as the messenger.
- With weight cuts beginning, Torres gets defensive when Kagan confronts her about moving rooms. She does not want to think about unnecessary stress before her fight and stands her ground not to move.
- The fighters relax at a pool party at "The Pond" in Green Valley Ranch Resort, but the claws come out when the Skrappettes unexpectedly leave early, saying Rawlings had no need to be out in the sun before her weight cut. Ellis then comments that the Skrapettes are a "little five-some clan under the leadership of Magana with their bullying and they're a bunch of mean girls."
- Torres prepares for her second chance in the strawweight tournament with her new team and Pettis feels that if he had her from the start, Torres would be in a better position than she currently is, style-wise. While Rawlings is "pissed" that Clark is helping Torres cut weight, but later opens up about being in an abusive relationship in her past.
- Tecia Torres defeated Bec Rawlings via unanimous decision after 2 rounds.
- After the fight, guest assistant coach Nate Diaz and some of the Skrapettes started booing the decision, causing Joanne Calderwood to reprimand them.
- The coaches call out the quarterfinal match ups: #6 Felice Herrig vs. #14 Randa Markos, #5 Aisling Daly vs. #4 Jessica Penne, #1 Carla Esparza vs. #3 Tecia Torres, and #7 Rose Namajunas vs. # 2 Joanne Calderwood (who both get in an intense stare down that their coaches had to break up).

Episode 9: Don't Talk to Me (November 19, 2014)

- Team Pettis is excited about the number of fighters they advanced into the next round and along with Team Melendez, decide to celebrate with a night of drinking. However, Tecia Torres does not like their decision and becomes frustrated with the rowdiness of her teammates and decides to move into a different room.
- At the teal team's next training session, Pettis in conflicted with how to divide his attention between his team's seven quarterfinalists. He opts to remove himself from the situation and spreads the assistant coaching staff between the fighters.
- But, Pettis' decision does not sit well with the team, and they all meet to work out a solution, and they then decide to split into two groups. One group will train in the morning while the other group trains at night. Fighters like Joanne Calderwood and Alex Chambers are not affected by this.
- It was time for the season's coaches challenge: Pettis and Melendez go head-to-head in a different kind of competition. This year's TUF Coaches Challenge is a UFC trivia contest hosted by UFC fight announcer Bruce Buffer for a chance to win their team $10,000 cash. In past seasons, the coaches typically faced-off in a physical challenge, but Pettis' lingering knee injury prevents him from doing so. The trivia categories were divided into "The Ultimate Fighter History", "UFC History" and "UFC's Famous Finishes". It was a tie after two rounds, but Melendez won the third, and a surprise sudden-victory round gave Pettis a final opportunity to take the lead. But he answered the final question incorrectly and waged all of his points, making Melendez the winner. Melendez received $10,000 as a prize, as well as, $1,500 for each member of his team.
- Focus shifts to Markos, who faces teammate Herrig in the first quarterfinal match up of the season. Markos was the lowest seed to advance past the first round; she upset No. 3 Torres in the first contest of the season. Markos' wrestling led her to the victory over Torres, and she believes the same asset will be key in defeating Herrig.
- Controversy ignites again within Team Pettis because several fighters now want to train two sessions per day, not just one as previously agreed upon. The next morning, Markos decides to attend the morning session, much to the chagrin of Carla Esparza. A confrontation takes place in the van on the way to the gym, but Markos refuses to leave.
- Once the van arrives at the TUF gym, Esparza and Herrig bring the situation to Pettis' attention. While he would like to stick to the original agreement of split training sessions, he says that MMA is an individual, not a team sport, and he is unable to make any decisions on Markos' behalf.
- At the official weigh ins, an intense stare down takes place. Herrig is chewing gum and blows a bubble in Markos’ face. An intense Markos slaps the bubble away.
- Randa Markos defeated Felice Herrig via submission (modified armbar) at 2:46 in round 1.
- After the fight, Markos says that maybe the result will shut Herrig's mouth and she gets confronted by Esparza, with both fighters threatening each other over a possible future fight.
- The next quarter final match up is Team Pettis' teammates: #5 Aisling Daly vs. #4 Jessica Penne.

Episode 10: Fighting For Themselves (November 26, 2014)

- Justine Kish thinks that her teammate and roommate Daly dislikes her and vents her frustration out with her best friend Jessica Penne who does not want to waste energy on unnecessary drama.
- The fighters and coaches visit the Red Rock Harley-Davidson dealer to test out their possible winning rides and try-on outfits in the H-D Motorcycle Boot Camp.
- Daly gets a surprise visit from UFC featherweight fighter Conor McGregor who is in town for a few media sessions for his next fight against Dustin Poirier (UFC 178). He stopped by the TUF gym to give moral support to his fellow Irish training partner.
- Jessica Penne defeated Aisling Daly via unanimous decision after three rounds.
- The next quarterfinal match ups are: #1 Carla Esparza vs. #3 Tecia Torres, and #7 Rose Namajunas vs. # 2 Joanne Calderwood.

Episode 11: Best Job in the World (December 3, 2014)

- Tecia Torres faces former Invicta Strawweight Champion Carla Esparza, who she was supposed to fight next in their last promotion after Esparza called Torres out.
- Carla Esparza defeated Tecia Torres via majority decision after two rounds.
- After not perfecting a technique in training, Namajunas breaks down and gets emotional with her nerves before her fight.
- Meanwhile, Calderwood remains calm and relaxed, staying positive because, she says, "At the end of the day, this is what I love doing and it’s the best job in the world."
- Rose Namajunas defeated Joanne Calderwood via submission (kimura) at 2:55 in round 2.
- The semifinal match ups are announced: #1 Carla Esparza vs. #4 Jessica Penne, and #7 Rose Namajunas vs. #14 Randa Markos.

Episode 12: It's About to Get Real (December 10, 2014)

- As they near their fight, good friends Esparza and Penne prepare to face each other as opponents for the first time. They train at opposite sides of the gym, not wanting to know the other’s game plan.
- Carla Esparza defeated Jessica Penne via unanimous decision after three rounds.
- White surprises Markos for her birthday with a phone call from her sister, Reva Hermiz and the two share an emotional conversation.
- Rose Namajunas defeated Randa Markos via submission (kimura) at 2:16 in round 1.
- Esparza and Namajunas both make history as they move on to fight for the world title in the first-ever 115-pound UFC Women’s Championship in the TUF season 20 live finale in Las Vegas.

== Tournament bracket ==
Prelims
1 Carla Esparza	SUB
16 Angela Hill	1
8 Bec Rawlings	2
3 Tecia Torres*	UD
5 Aisling Daly	TKO
12 Angela Magana	3
4 Jessica Penne	SUB
13 Lisa Ellis	1
6 Felice Herrig	UD
11 Heather Jo Clark	2
3 Tecia Torres	3
14 Randa Markos	UD
7 Rose Namajunas	SUB
10 Alex Chambers	1
2 Joanne Calderwood	MD
15 Emily Kagan	2

Quarter-finals
1 Carla Esparza	MD
3 Tecia Torres	2
5 Aisling Daly	3
4 Jessica Penne	UD
6 Felice Herrig	1
14 Randa Markos	SUB
7 Rose Namajunas	SUB
2 Joanne Calderwood	2

Semi-finals
1 Carla Esparza	UD
4 Jessica Penne	3
14 Randa Markos	1
7 Rose Namajunas	SUB

Finale
1 Carla Esparza	SUB
7 Rose Namajunas	3

* 9th seed Justine Kish had to leave the competition due to an injured knee and was replaced by Torres who had previously lost her first round fight. Torres moved from Team Melendez to Team Pettis as Kish had been on Team Pettis.

Legend
	Team Pettis
	Team Melendez
UD	Unanimous Decision
MD	Majority Decision
SUB	Submission
(T) KO	(Technical) Knockout

=== Bonus awards ===
Fans voted to award the following $25,000 bonus awards to fights that took place during the TUF 20 season:

- Fight of the Season: Rose Namajunas vs. Joanne Calderwood
- Performance of the Season: Randa Markos and Rose Namajunas

== Coaches' fight ==
UFC 181: Hendricks vs. Lawler II was held on December 6, 2014 in Las Vegas, Nevada.

- UFC Lightweight Championship bout: (United States) Anthony Pettis (c) vs. (United States) Gilbert Melendez

Anthony Pettis defeated Gilbert Melendez via submission (guillotine choke) at 1:53 of the second round.

== The Ultimate Fighter 20 Finale ==
The Ultimate Fighter: A Champion Will Be Crowned
- The poster for The Ultimate Fighter: A Champion Will Be Crowned
- Promotion: Ultimate Fighting Championship
- Date: December 12, 2014
- Venue: Palms Casino Resort
- City: Las Vegas, Nevada
- Attendance: 1,800
- Total gate: $143,000

Event chronology
UFC 181: Hendricks vs. Lawler II	The Ultimate Fighter: A Champion Will Be Crowned	UFC on Fox: dos Santos vs. Miocic

The Ultimate Fighter: A Champion Will Be Crowned Finale (also known as The Ultimate Fighter 20 Finale) was a mixed martial arts event held by the Ultimate Fighting Championship. It took place on December 12, 2014, at the Palms Casino Resort in Las Vegas, Nevada.

=== Background ===
The event featured the finals of the Women's Strawweight tournament between finalists Carla Esparza and Rose Namajunas, which crowned the inaugural UFC Women's Strawweight champion.

The rest of the contestants from the show, with the exception of an injured Justine Kish, filled out the remainder of the card. Filling in for Kish was Seohee Ham, the first Korean female fighter in the promotion.

Oliveira came in at 147 pounds at the weigh ins and was given one hour to cut an extra pound to make the featherweight limit, but he could not make the weight and weighted in at 146.5 pounds. He forfeited 10 percent of his purse to Stephens. Also, Daly originally came in at 118 pounds and did not elect to cut the remaining weight. She forfeited 20 percent of her purse to Chambers.

=== Results ===
Main Card (Fox Sports 1)
Weight class				Method	Round	Time	Notes
Women's Strawweight	Carla Esparza	def.	Rose Namajunas	Submission (rear-naked choke)	3	1:26	(Note: For the inaugural UFC Women's Strawweight Championship.)
Catchweight (146.5 lb)	Charles Oliveira	def.	Jeremy Stephens	Decision (unanimous) (30–27, 29–28, 29–28)	3	5:00
Lightweight	K. J. Noons	vs.	Daron Cruickshank	No Contest (accidental eye poke)	2	0:25	(Note: An accidental eye poke rendered Cruickshank unable to continue; as the fight had not reached the third round, it was declared a No Contest.)
Lightweight	Yancy Medeiros	def.	Joe Proctor	Submission (guillotine choke)	1	4:37
Women's Strawweight	Jessica Penne	def.	Randa Markos	Decision (split) (28–29, 30–27, 29–28)	3	5:00
Preliminary Card (Fox Sports 1)
Women's Strawweight	Felice Herrig	def.	Lisa Ellis	Submission (armbar)	2	3:05
Women's Strawweight	Heather Jo Clark	def.	Bec Rawlings	Decision (unanimous) (29–28, 29–28, 29–28)	3	5:00
Women's Strawweight	Joanne Calderwood	def.	Seo Hee Ham	Decision (unanimous) (30–27, 30–27, 30–26)	3	5:00
Women's Strawweight	Tecia Torres	def.	Angela Magaña	Decision (unanimous) (30–27, 30–27, 30–26)	3	5:00
Preliminary Card (UFC Fight Pass)
Catchweight (118 lb)	Aisling Daly	def.	Alex Chambers	Submission (armbar)	1	4:53
Women's Strawweight	Angela Hill	def.	Emily Kagan	Decision (unanimous) (30–26, 30–26, 30–27)	3	5:00

=== Bonus awards ===
The following fighters were awarded $50,000 bonuses:

- Fight of the Night: Jessica Penne vs. Randa Markos
- Performance of the Night: Carla Esparza and Yancy Medeiros

=== Reported payout ===
The following is the reported payout to the fighters as reported to the Nevada State Athletic Commission. It does not include sponsor money and also does not include the UFC's traditional "fight night" bonuses.

- Carla Esparza: $50,000 (includes $25,000 win bonus) def. Rose Namajunas: $25,000
- Charles Oliveira: $54,000 (includes $27,000 win bonus) def. Jeremy Stephens: $40,000 ^
- K. J. Noons: $31,000 vs. Daron Cruickshank: $17,000 <
- Yancy Medeiros: $30,000 (includes $15,000 win bonus) def. Joe Proctor: $10,000
- Jessica Penne: $16,000 (includes $14,000 win bonus) def. Randa Markos: $8,000
- Felice Herrig: $16,000 (includes $8,000 win bonus) def. Lisa Ellis $8,000
- Heather Jo Clark: $16,000 (includes $8,000 win bonus) def. Bec Rawlings: $8,000
- Joanne Calderwood: $16,000 (includes $8,000 win bonus) def. Seohee Ham: $8,000
- Tecia Torres: $16,000 (includes $8,000 win bonus) def. Angela Magaña: $8,000
- Aisling Daly: $16,000 (includes $8,000 win bonus) def. Alex Chambers: $8,000 >
- Angela Hill: $16,000 (includes $8,000 win bonus) def. Emily Kagan: $8,000

^ Although not recognized on the official pay sheet, Oliveira was fined $5,400, or 10% of his pay for missing weight for the fight. That money was issued to Stephens, an NSAC official confirmed.
< Both fighters earned show money; bout declared No Contest.
> Although not recognized on the official pay sheet, Daly was fined $3,200, or 20% of her pay for missing weight for the fight. That money was issued to Chambers, an NSAC official confirmed.

== See also ==
- The Ultimate Fighter
- List of current UFC fighters
- List of UFC events
- 2014 in UFC
