= Betmaster =

Gambling platform based in Malta

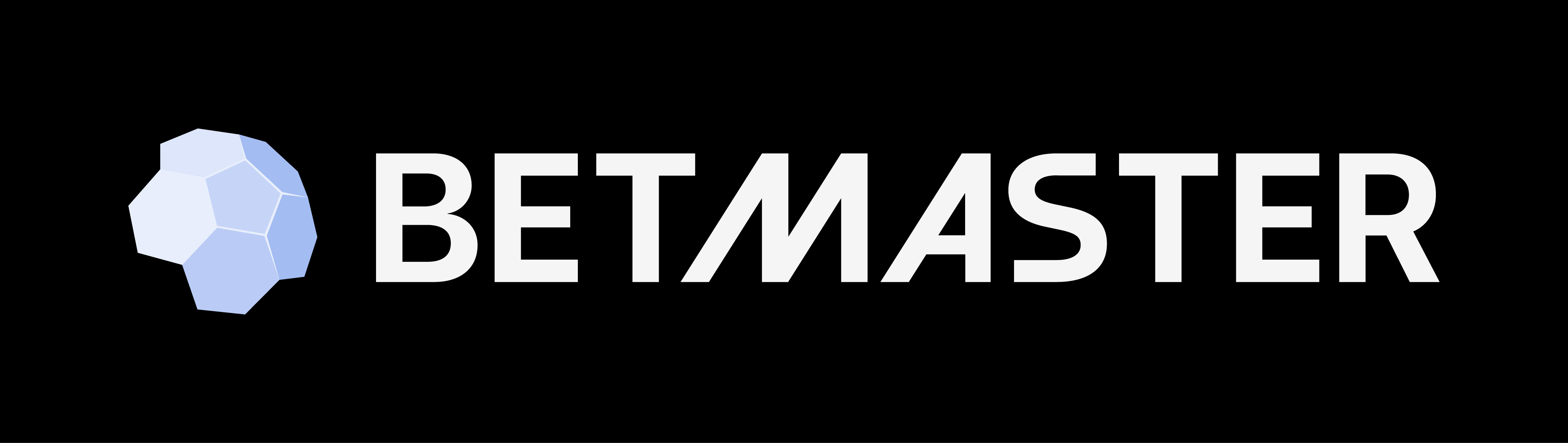
- Available in: English
- Founded: 2014
- Headquarters: {{{location_country}}}
- Area served: International
- Industry: Online gambling
- Services: Online betting & gambling
- Website: betmaster.com

Betmaster is an online gambling and casino gaming platform founded in 2014 based in Malta. Its services include sports and esports betting, casino games, and live casino games such as blackjack, poker, roulette, blackjack and baccarat. The platform is available in more than 25 languages.

Although Betmaster initially gained greater visibility in Mexico, it is now an international brand with a notable presence in the United Kingdom, Ireland, and Estonia. The company also operates under various gambling licenses in different jurisdictions, including Malta (Malta Gaming Authority, MGA), Curaçao, Tobique—Mactaquac (Canada), and the Isle of Man.

In 2024, the platform organized an event in collaboration with Mexican broadcaster TV Azteca.

In 2025, Betmaster appointed several professional athletes as official brand ambassadors, including Mexican mixed martial arts fighters Brandon Moreno and Alexa Grasso. In October 2025, Belgian footballer Thibaut Courtois of Real Madrid CF was announced as a brand ambassador. As part of the agreement, Betmaster sponsors TC Racing, Courtois’s own team, which competes in the F4 Spanish Championship.
