= Felice Herrig =

American mixed martial artist

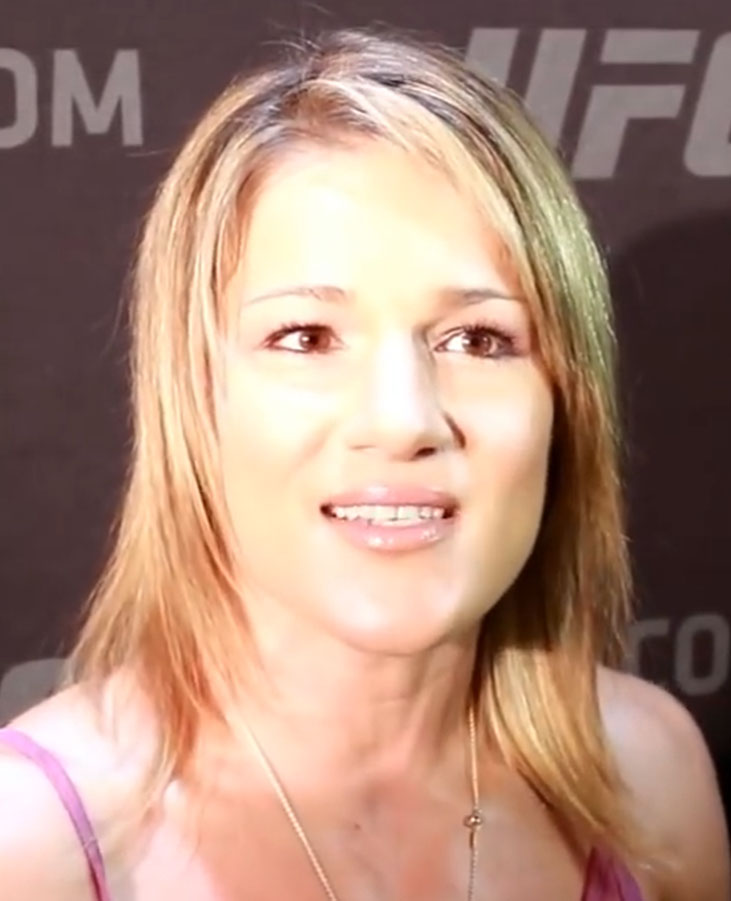
- Felice Herrig at UFC 229
- Born: Felice Nicole Herrig; September 18, 1984 (age 42); Buffalo Grove, Illinois, U.S.
- Other names: Lil Bulldog
- Height: 5 ft 4 in (1.63 m)
- Weight: 115 lb (52 kg; 8.2 st)
- Division: Strawweight
- Reach: 65 in (165 cm)
- Fighting out of: Crystal Lake, Illinois
- Team: Alliance MMA (2009); Team Curran (2010–2020); Valle Flow Striking (2020–present)
- Rank: Purple belt in Brazilian Jiu-Jitsu under Jeff Curran
- Years active: 2009–2023

Professional boxing record
- Total: 1
- Wins: 1
- By knockout: 1
- Losses: 0

Kickboxing record
- Total: 28
- Wins: 23
- Losses: 5

Mixed martial arts record
- Total: 24
- Wins: 14
- By knockout: 1
- By submission: 4
- By decision: 9
- Losses: 10
- By submission: 2
- By decision: 8

Other information
- Boxing record from BoxRec
- Mixed martial arts record from Sherdog

Felice Nicole Herrig (born September 18, 1984) is an American retired kickboxer, Muay Thai fighter, and mixed martial artist who competed in the Ultimate Fighting Championship (UFC) in the strawweight division.

== Background ==
Herrig was born in Buffalo Grove, Illinois. She had a younger brother, who died of pancreatic cancer at the age of two. Herrig began her career practicing kickboxing and Muay Thai before transitioning to MMA in 2009. Herrig graduated from Buffalo Grove High School in 2003.

== Kickboxing career ==
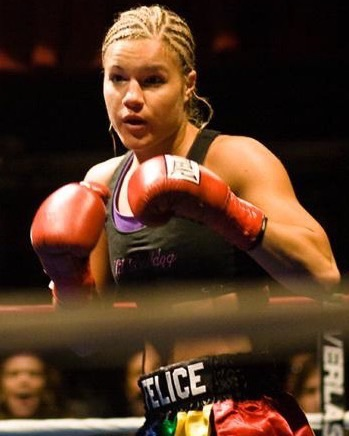
Herrig in a match at Muay Thai Mayhem XIV in New York City on June 16, 2009

Prior to Herrig's move to mixed martial arts, she held a professional kickboxing record of 23–5. She was ranked as high as number 2 in the World in the IKF International Kickboxing Federation Pro Women's Muay Thai Bantamweight Division.

As a pro kickboxer, Herrig won the International Kickboxing Federation Pro Muay Thai United States Bantamweight Title. She won the title on November 15, 2008, in Chicago, Illinois, US, when she defeated Katie Meehan by unanimous decision (49-46, 48–47, 49–46).

As an amateur, she was a two-time International Kickboxing Federation Open Tournament Champion.

On August 21, 2005, Herrig became the 2005 IKF North American Classic Amateur Full Contact Rules Bantamweight Tournament Champion when she defeated Terri French of Little Rock, Arkansas, US, by unanimous decision 30–27 on all 3 judges cards.

On July 30, 2006, Herrig defended her IKF Tournament Title at the 2006 IKF World Classic when she defeated Stacy Chung of Thunder Bay, Ontario, Canada by unanimous decision 29–28 on all 3 judges cards.

She has also competed in the World Combat League with the St. Louis Enforcers.

== Mixed martial arts career ==
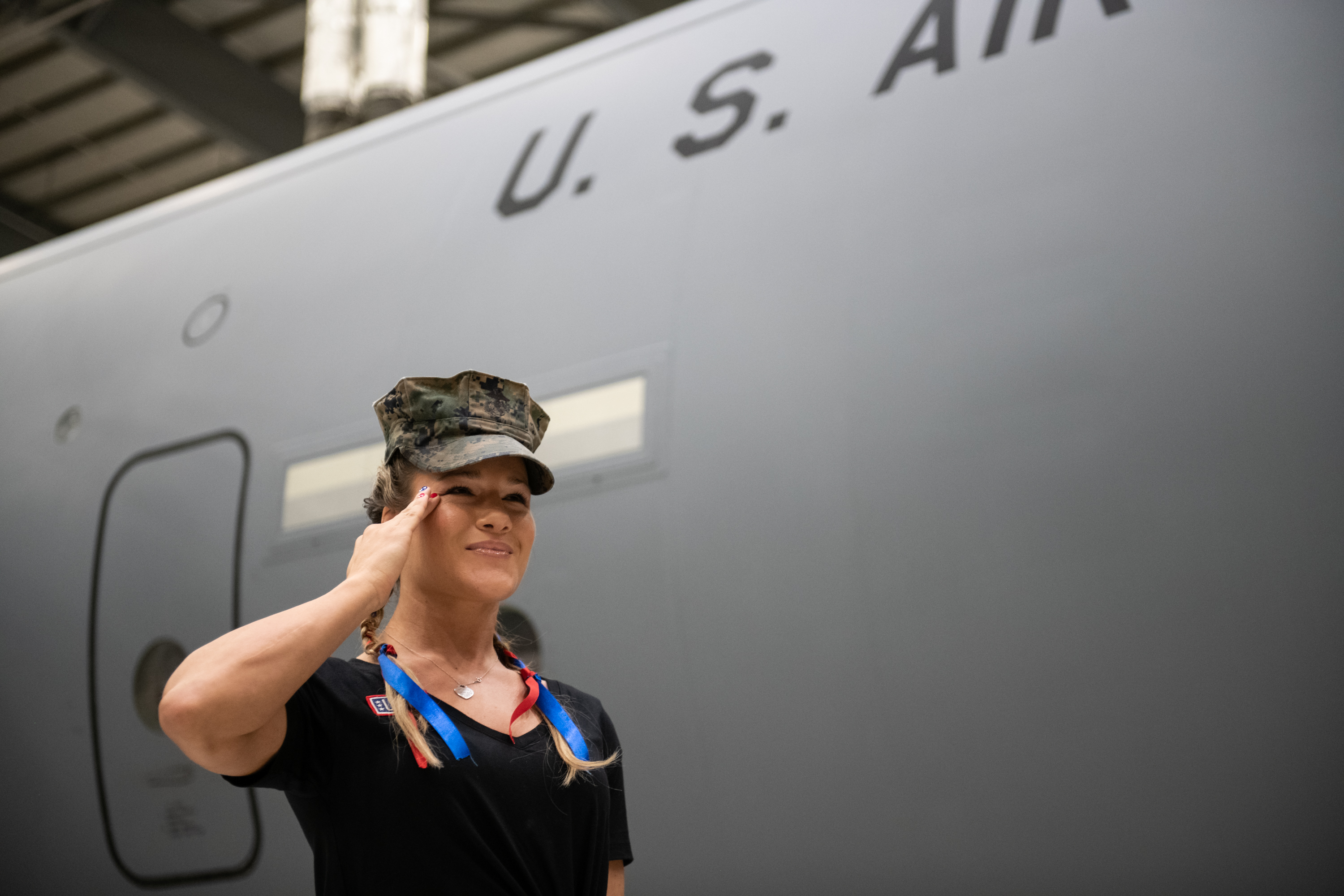
Felice Herrig at Bagram Airfield, Afghanistan; the second stop on the annual Vice Chairman's USO Tour, March 31, 2019.

Herrig appeared on Fight Girls in 2007 on the Oxygen and won her fight in Thailand against a champion Thai fighter. She was later scheduled to appear on another reality show about women's MMA called the Ultimate Women Challenge.

Herrig faced Iman Achhal at UWC: Man "O" War on February 21, 2009, in her MMA debut. She lost the fight by split decision.

She faced Michele Gutierrez at Unconquered 1: November Reign on November 20, 2009, and won the fight by armbar submission in the second round.

Herrig faced Jessica Rakoczy at Bellator 14 on April 15, 2010. She won the fight via split decision.

Herrig faced Amanda LaVoy at XFO 37 on December 4, 2010. She won the fight via armbar submission in the first round.

On January 14, 2011, Herrig faced Barb Honchak at Hoosier Fight Club 6: New Years Nemesis in Valparaiso, Indiana. She lost the fight via unanimous decision.

Herrig faced Andrea Miller at Chicago Cagefighting Championship 3 on March 5, 2011. She won the fight by TKO in the first round.

Herrig faced Nicdali Rivera-Calanoc at XFO 39 on May 13, 2011, at the Sears Centre in Hoffman Estates, Illinois. She won the fight via unanimous decision.

Her scheduled bout against undefeated Kelly Warren at Fight Tour on August 20, 2011, was cancelled due to Warren weighing in 7 pounds overweight.

Herrig faced Carla Esparza at XFC 15: Tribute on December 2, 2011, in Tampa, Florida. She was defeated by unanimous decision.

On April 13, 2012, Herrig faced Patricia Vidonic at XFC 17: Apocalypse in Jackson, Tennessee. She defeated Vidonic by unanimous decision.

Herrig next faced Simona Soukupova at XFC 19: Charlotte Showdown on August 3, 2012. She defeated Soukupova by unanimous decision.

Herrig was scheduled to return to Bellator to face Michele Gutierrez in a rematch at Bellator 84 on December 14, 2012. However, Gutierrez withdrew from the fight on December 1 and Herrig instead competed in a rematch against Patricia Vidonic. She won the fight via unanimous decision.

Herrig next competed against Heather Clark at Bellator 94 on March 28, 2013. She won the fight via split decision. The fight ended controversially as following the final bell Herrig unleashed a yell of celebration in her opponent's face, which prompted a post-fight backhand punch from Clark. Herrig retaliated with a punch of her own, before order was restored.

=== Invicta Fighting Championships ===
On August 13, 2013, it was announced that Herrig had signed a multi-fight deal with Invicta Fighting Championships. She faced Tecia Torres at Invicta FC 7: Honchak vs. Smith on December 7, 2013 and lost the fight via unanimous decision.

=== The Ultimate Fighter 20 ===
On December 11, 2013, it was announced that Herrig was signed by the UFC along with ten other strawweight fighters to compete on season 20 of The Ultimate Fighter, which will crown the first ever UFC women's strawweight champion.

Herrig was the sixth fighter to go to coach Anthony Pettis. She faced rival Heather Jo Clark in a rematch in the preliminary round of the tournament. Herrig again won the fight by unanimous decision. She lost to Randa Markos via submission in the quarterfinal round of competition.

=== Ultimate Fighting Championship ===
Herrig's first fight after The Ultimate Fighter was against Lisa Ellis at The Ultimate Fighter: A Champion Will Be Crowned Finale on December 12, 2014. She won the fight via submission in the second round.

Herrig faced Paige VanZant on April 18, 2015, at UFC on Fox 15. She lost the fight by unanimous decision.

Herrig next faced Kailin Curran at UFC on Fox 20 on July 23, 2016. She won the fight by rear naked choke just two minutes into the first round.

Herrig next faced Alexa Grasso on February 4, 2017, at UFC Fight Night 104. She won the fight by unanimous decision.

Herrig faced Justine Kish on June 25, 2017, at UFC Fight Night: Chiesa vs. Lee. She won the fight by unanimous decision.

Herrig faced Cortney Casey on December 2, 2017, at UFC 218. She won the fight via split decision.

Herrig faced Karolina Kowalkiewicz on April 7, 2018, at UFC 223. She lost the fight by split decision.

Herrig next faced Michelle Waterson on October 6, 2018, at UFC 229. She lost the fight via unanimous decision

Herrig was expected to face Xiaonan Yan on June 8, 2019, at UFC 238. However, on April 30, 2019, it was reported that Herrig suffered from a torn ACL and was pulled from the event.

Herrig faced Virna Jandiroba on August 15, 2020, at UFC 252. She lost the fight via an armbar submission in the first round.

After a two-year hiatus, Herrig faced Karolina Kowalkiewicz on June 4, 2022, at UFC Fight Night 207. Herrig lost the bout via rear-naked choke in the second round, retiring after the bout. She retired from competing in MMA after the loss.

== Boxing career ==
Herrig made her professional boxing debut against Veronika Dmitriyeva on July 22, 2023. She won the bout via fourth-round technical knockout.

== Championships and accomplishments ==
=== Mixed martial arts ===
- Ultimate Fighting Championship
  - UFC.com Awards
    - 2017: Ranked #8 Upset of the Year vs. Alexa Grasso

== Mixed martial arts record ==
Professional record breakdown
24 matches	14 wins	10 losses
By knockout	1	0
By submission	4	2
By decision	9	8

Res.	Record	Opponent	Method	Event	Date	Round	Time	Location	Notes
Loss	14–10	Karolina Kowalkiewicz	Submission (rear-naked choke)	UFC Fight Night: Volkov vs. Rozenstruik	June 4, 2022	2	4:01	Las Vegas, Nevada, United States	
Loss	14–9	Virna Jandiroba	Submission (armbar)	UFC 252	August 15, 2020	1	1:44	Las Vegas, Nevada, United States	
Loss	14–8	Michelle Waterson	Decision (unanimous)	UFC 229	October 6, 2018	3	5:00	Las Vegas, Nevada, United States	
Loss	14–7	Karolina Kowalkiewicz	Decision (split)	UFC 223	April 7, 2018	3	5:00	Brooklyn, New York, United States	
Win	14–6	Cortney Casey	Decision (split)	UFC 218	December 2, 2017	3	5:00	Detroit, Michigan, United States	
Win	13–6	Justine Kish	Decision (unanimous)	UFC Fight Night: Chiesa vs. Lee	June 25, 2017	3	5:00	Oklahoma City, Oklahoma, United States	
Win	12–6	Alexa Grasso	Decision (unanimous)	UFC Fight Night: Bermudez vs. Korean Zombie	February 4, 2017	3	5:00	Houston, Texas, United States	
Win	11–6	Kailin Curran	Submission (rear-naked choke)	UFC on Fox: Holm vs. Shevchenko	July 23, 2016	1	1:59	Chicago, Illinois, United States	Performance of the Night.
Loss	10–6	Paige VanZant	Decision (unanimous)	UFC on Fox: Machida vs. Rockhold	April 18, 2015	3	5:00	Newark, New Jersey, United States	
Win	10–5	Lisa Ellis	Submission (armbar)	The Ultimate Fighter: A Champion Will Be Crowned Finale	December 12, 2014	2	3:05	Las Vegas, Nevada, United States	
Loss	9–5	Tecia Torres	Decision (unanimous)	Invicta FC 7: Honchak vs. Smith	December 7, 2013	3	5:00	Kansas City, Missouri, United States	
Win	9–4	Heather Jo Clark	Decision (split)	Bellator 94	March 28, 2013	3	5:00	Tampa, Florida, United States	
Win	8–4	Patricia Vidonic	Decision (unanimous)	Bellator 84	December 14, 2012	3	5:00	Hammond, Indiana, United States	
Win	7–4	Simona Soukupova	Decision (unanimous)	XFC 19: Charlotte Showdown	August 3, 2012	3	5:00	Charlotte, North Carolina, United States	
Win	6–4	Patricia Vidonic	Decision (unanimous)	XFC 17: Apocalypse	April 13, 2012	3	5:00	Jackson, Tennessee, United States	
Loss	5–4	Carla Esparza	Decision (unanimous)	XFC 15: Tribute	December 2, 2011	3	5:00	Tampa, Florida, United States	
Win	5–3	Nicdali Rivera-Calanoc	Decision (unanimous)	Xtreme Fighting Organization 39	May 13, 2011	3	5:00	Hoffman Estates, Illinois, United States	
Win	4–3	Andrea Miller	TKO (punches)	Chicago Cagefighting Championship 3	March 5, 2011	1	3:30	Villa Park, Illinois, United States	
Loss	3–3	Barb Honchak	Decision (unanimous)	Hoosier Fight Club 6: New Years Nemesis	January 14, 2011	3	5:00	Valparaiso, Indiana, United States	
Win	3–2	Amanda LaVoy	Submission (armbar)	Xtreme Fighting Organization 37	December 4, 2010	1	3:35	Chicago, Illinois, United States	
Win	2–2	Jessica Rakoczy	Decision (split)	Bellator 14	April 15, 2010	3	5:00	Chicago, Illinois, United States	Catchweight (120 lb) bout.
Win	1–2	Michele Gutierrez	Submission (armbar)	Unconquered 1: November Reign	November 20, 2009	2	2:03	Coral Gables, Florida, United States	
Loss	0–2	Valerie Coolbaugh	Decision (split)	Xtreme Fighting Organization 29	April 17, 2009	3	5:00	Lakemoor, Illinois, United States	
Loss	0–1	Iman Achhal	Decision (split)	UWC: Man "O" War	February 21, 2009	3	5:00	Fairfax, Virginia, United States	Catchweight (120 lb) bout.

=== Mixed martial arts exhibition record ===
Exhibition record breakdown		
2 matches	1 win	1 loss
By submission	0	1
By decision	1	0

Res.	Record	Opponent	Method	Event	Date	Round	Time	Location	Notes
Loss	1–1	Randa Markos	Submission (scarf-hold armlock)	The Ultimate Fighter: A Champion Will Be Crowned	November 19, 2014 (airdate)	1	2:46	Las Vegas, Nevada, United States	TUF 20 Quarterfinal round.
Win	1–0	Heather Jo Clark	Decision (unanimous)	The Ultimate Fighter: A Champion Will Be Crowned	October 22, 2014 (airdate)	2	5:00	Las Vegas, Nevada, United States	TUF 20 Elimination round.

== Kickboxing record (incomplete) ==
Kickboxing record
23 wins (? KOs), 5 losses, 0 draws
Date	Result	Opponent	Event	Location	Method	Round	Time
2009-06-16	Win	(United States) Emily Bearden	Muay Thai Mayhem 14	New York City, New York, US	Decision (majority)	3	3:00
2008-11-15	Win	(United States) Katie Meehan	N/A	Chicago, Illinois, US	Decision (unanimous)	5	3:00
2005-03-18	Win	(United States) Liz McKay	Border Wars	Crystal Lake, Illinois, US	Decision (split)	3	3:00
Legend: Win Loss Draw/No contest Notes

== Professional boxing record ==
1 fight	1 win	0 losses
By knockout	1	0

No.	Result	Record	Opponent	Type	Round, time	Date	Location	Notes
1	Win	1–0	(Russia) Veronika Dmitriyeva	RTD	4 (6), 2:00	22 July 2023	(United States) Riverside Ballroom, Green Bay, Wisconsin, US	

== Media appearances ==
Herrig is a playable character in the 2011 video game Supremacy MMA for Xbox 360 and PlayStation 3. She also appeared in American Ninja Warrior in 2015, and again in 2016, but did not complete the initial courses.

== See also ==
- List of female mixed martial artists
