= Randa Markos =

Iraqi-Canadian mixed martial artist

- Born: Randa Cemil Markos-Thomas; August 10, 1985 (age 41); Baghdad, Iraq
- Other names: Quiet Storm
- Height: 5 ft 4 in (1.63 m)
- Weight: 115 lb (52 kg; 8 st 3 lb)
- Division: Strawweight
- Reach: 63 1/2 in (161 cm)
- Style: Wrestling, Jiu Jitsu
- Fighting out of: Windsor, Ontario, Canada
- Team: Maximum Training Centre (until 2014); Tristar Gym (2015–2016); Michigan Top Team (2014–2021); Strongstyle; Team Lutter (2021–present)
- Rank: Purple belt in Brazilian Jiu-Jitsu under Fábio Lima
- Years active: 2009–present

Mixed martial arts record
- Total: 23
- Wins: 11
- By submission: 4
- By decision: 7
- Losses: 11
- By submission: 2
- By decision: 8
- By disqualification: 1
- Draws: 1

Amateur record
- Total: 6
- Wins: 4
- By knockout: 1
- By submission: 1
- By decision: 2
- Losses: 2
- By submission: 1
- By decision: 1

Other information
- Mixed martial arts record from Sherdog

Randa Cemil Markos-Thomas (born August 10, 1985), more commonly known as Randa Markos, is an Iraqi-born Canadian professional mixed martial artist who competes in the strawweight division. She most notably fought in the Ultimate Fighting Championship (UFC), where she was undefeated in her first three matches.

== Early life ==
Markos was born in Baghdad, Iraq in 1985 to an ethnically Assyrian family of Chaldean Catholic religious background. Her father was a business-owner who had been conscripted in the Iraqi Armed Forces during the Iran–Iraq War and had made the decision to flee the country, but had separated from Markos and her family since he was targeted. They traveled to Turkey and were allowed to stay in Istanbul for a year for visas, but were then sent to a prison camp near the border after failure to achieve paperwork. They successfully escaped with the help of an aunt and boarded a plane to Canada that same year before settling in Windsor, Ontario.

While growing up, Markos endured physical abuse from her father, who was an alcoholic. She has stated that she sent him to jail at least five times. Her first interest in wrestling came when she was in high school, though her family insisted that she didn't take part in it, forcing her to lie by saying she was going to volleyball practice.

Markos earned her Pharmacy Assistant Diploma at TriOS College. She then worked as a pharmacy technician in Windsor, working in the field from 2009 until 2015.

== Mixed martial arts career ==
Markos made her pro MMA debut on November 17, 2012, at IFC 51 defeating Allanna Jones via third round armbar. She had begun mixed martial arts with no prior experience in Jiu-jitsu.

Markos compiled an unblemished 3–0 record making her RFA debut against future TUF 20 teammate Justine Kish. Markos suffered her first loss that night via unanimous decision.

She quickly bounced back by defeating Lynnell House via armbar in the first round and capturing the PFC Strawweight title.

=== The Ultimate Fighter ===
Markos was among the final eight contestants that tried out for the TUF house, to join the 11 Invicta FC strawweights that President Dana White had acquired.

Markos was ranked #14 for Team Pettis, and was matched up against #3 ranked Tecia Torres for the first fight of the season. Markos defeated Torres via decision after three rounds to give Team Pettis their first win.

On the ninth episode, Markos was set to take on Felice Herrig in the first quarterfinal match up. Tension began to build when several of the fighters wanted to train separately and have two sessions per day, one in the morning and one at night. Markos decided to appear at a morning practice, which didn't sit well with Carla Esparza, who confronted Markos to try to get her to leave; Markos did not. She defeated Herrig via scarfhold armbar, in the first round.

In the season finale, Markos was paired up against Rose Namajunas in the semifinal. Markos lost via first round submission.

=== Ultimate Fighting Championship ===
Markos made her promotional debut at The Ultimate Fighter 20 Finale, as part of Team Pettis and taking on fellow semi-finalist Jessica Penne. She lost in a close split decision and was awarded Fight of the Night. She received praise from UFC president Dana White for her performance.

Markos filled in for the injured Cláudia Gadelha at UFC 186, taking on Aisling Daly. She scored a takedown against Daly in the second and final rounds, and won via unanimous decision. Later that year, Markos faced promotional newcomer Karolina Kowalkiewicz on December 19, 2015 at UFC on Fox 17. She lost the fight by unanimous decision.

Markos defeated Jocelyn Jones-Lybarger at UFC Fight Night 89 on June 18, 2016, by unanimous decision. In the same month, Markos took on Cortney Casey at UFC 202; she lost in the first round via armbar.

Markos next faced Carla Esparza on February 19, 2017 at UFC Fight Night: Lewis vs. Browne, having walked into fight with resentment since their interactions on TUF. She won the fight by split decision. On August 5, 2017, Markos faced Alexa Grasso at UFC Fight Night: Pettis vs. Moreno. Grasso came in at 119 lbs, three pounds over the strawweight limit, at weigh-ins, and was fined 20% of her purse, which went to Markos. The bout proceeded at a catchweight. Markos lost the fight via split decision.

Markos faced Juliana Lima on January 27, 2018 at UFC on Fox 27. She won the fight via unanimous decision. On July 28, 2018, Markos faced Nina Ansaroff at UFC on Fox 30. She lost the fight via unanimous decision. Markos faced promotional newcomer Marina Rodriguez on September 22, 2018 at UFC Fight Night 137. The back and forth contest was ultimately ruled a majority draw.

Markos faced former TUF housemate Angela Hill on March 23, 2019 at UFC Fight Night: Thompson vs. Pettis. She won the fight due to an armbar submission in the first round. This win earned her the Performance of the Night award. On July 6, 2019, she faced Cláudia Gadelha on at UFC 239. She lost the fight via unanimous decision. Markos faced Ashley Yoder on October 26, 2019 at UFC on ESPN+ 20. She won the fight via split decision.

Markos faced Amanda Ribas, replacing injured Paige VanZant on March 14, 2020 at UFC Fight Night 170. She lost the fight via unanimous decision. On September 19, 2020, Markos faced Mackenzie Dern at UFC Fight Night 178. She lost the fight via submission in the first round. Markos faced promotional newcomer Kanako Murata, replacing injured Lívia Renata Souza, on November 14, 2020 at UFC Fight Night: Felder vs. dos Anjos. She lost the fight via unanimous decision.

Markos moved to Texas around 2021 to switch gyms due to the COVID-19 pandemic. Markos was scheduled to face Luana Pinheiro on March 27, 2021 at UFC 260. However, she was removed from the card on March 18 after testing positive for COVID-19. The bout was rescheduled for May 1, 2021 at UFC on ESPN: Reyes vs. Procházka. Markos lost the bout via disqualification in the first round after accidentally upkicking Pinheiro in the head, resulting in Pinheiro being unable to continue. She accused Pinheiro of faking the injury in order to force a disqualification win.

Markos faced Lívia Renata Souza on October 23, 2021 at UFC Fight Night 196. She won the fight via unanimous decision. After the fight, it was announced that her UFC contract was not renewed.

== Personal life ==
Markos has family that live in other countries, namely Australia and California, having been split during the Iran-Iraq War. She is married to Jeff Thomas, who is also an MMA fighter.

== Championships and achievements ==
=== Mixed martial arts ===
- Ultimate Fighting Championship
  - Fight of the Night (One time) vs. Jessica Penne
  - Performance of the Night (One time) vs. Angela Hill
  - Fourth most bouts in UFC Women's Strawweight division history (18)
- Provincial Fighting Championships
  - Provincial FC Strawweight Title (One time)

== Mixed martial arts record ==
Professional record breakdown
23 matches	11 wins	11 losses
By submission	4	2
By decision	7	8
By disqualification	0	1
Draws	1	

Res.	Record	Opponent	Method	Event	Date	Round	Time	Location	Notes
Win	11–11–1	Lívia Renata Souza	Decision (unanimous)	UFC Fight Night: Costa vs. Vettori	October 23, 2021	3	5:00	Las Vegas, Nevada, United States	
Loss	10–11–1	Luana Pinheiro	DQ (illegal upkick)	UFC on ESPN: Reyes vs. Procházka	May 1, 2021	1	4:16	Las Vegas, Nevada, United States	
Loss	10–10–1	Kanako Murata	Decision (unanimous)	UFC Fight Night: Felder vs. dos Anjos	November 14, 2020	3	5:00	Las Vegas, Nevada, United States	
Loss	10–9–1	Mackenzie Dern	Submission (armbar)	UFC Fight Night: Covington vs. Woodley	September 19, 2020	1	3:44	Las Vegas, Nevada, United States	
Loss	10–8–1	Amanda Ribas	Decision (unanimous)	UFC Fight Night: Lee vs. Oliveira	March 14, 2020	3	5:00	Brasília, Brazil	
Win	10–7–1	Ashley Yoder	Decision (split)	UFC Fight Night: Maia vs. Askren	October 26, 2019	3	5:00	Kallang, Singapore	
Loss	9–7–1	Cláudia Gadelha	Decision (unanimous)	UFC 239	July 6, 2019	3	5:00	Las Vegas, Nevada, United States	
Win	9–6–1	Angela Hill	Submission (armbar)	UFC Fight Night: Thompson vs. Pettis	March 23, 2019	1	4:24	Nashville, Tennessee, United States	Performance of the Night.
Draw	8–6–1	Marina Rodriguez	Draw (majority)	UFC Fight Night: Santos vs. Anders	September 22, 2018	3	5:00	São Paulo, Brazil	
Loss	8–6	Nina Ansaroff	Decision (unanimous)	UFC on Fox: Alvarez vs. Poirier 2	July 28, 2018	3	5:00	Calgary, Alberta, Canada	
Win	8–5	Juliana Lima	Decision (unanimous)	UFC on Fox: Jacaré vs. Brunson 2	January 27, 2018	3	5:00	Charlotte, North Carolina, United States	
Loss	7–5	Alexa Grasso	Decision (split)	UFC Fight Night: Pettis vs. Moreno	August 5, 2017	3	5:00	Mexico City, Mexico	Catchweight (119 lb) bout; Grasso missed weight.
Win	7–4	Carla Esparza	Decision (split)	UFC Fight Night: Lewis vs. Browne	February 19, 2017	3	5:00	Halifax, Nova Scotia, Canada	
Loss	6–4	Cortney Casey	Submission (armbar)	UFC 202	August 20, 2016	1	4:34	Las Vegas, Nevada, United States	
Win	6–3	Jocelyn Jones-Lybarger	Decision (unanimous)	UFC Fight Night: MacDonald vs. Thompson	June 18, 2016	3	5:00	Ottawa, Ontario, Canada	Catchweight (117.5 lb) bout; Markos missed weight.
Loss	5–3	Karolina Kowalkiewicz	Decision (unanimous)	UFC on Fox: dos Anjos vs. Cowboy 2	December 19, 2015	3	5:00	Orlando, Florida, United States	
Win	5–2	Aisling Daly	Decision (unanimous)	UFC 186	April 25, 2015	3	5:00	Montreal, Quebec, Canada	
Loss	4–2	Jessica Penne	Decision (split)	The Ultimate Fighter: A Champion Will Be Crowned Finale	December 12, 2014	3	5:00	Las Vegas, Nevada, United States	Fight of the Night.
Win	4–1	Lynnell House	Submission (armbar)	Provincial FC 2	March 8, 2014	1	1:57	London, Ontario, Canada	Won the inaugural PFC Strawweight Championship.
Loss	3–1	Justine Kish	Decision (unanimous)	RFA 12	January 24, 2014	3	5:00	Los Angeles, California, United States	
Win	3–0	Kara Kirsh	Decision (unanimous)	Provincial FC 1	October 26, 2013	3	5:00	London, Ontario, Canada	
Win	2–0	Ashley Nichols	Submission (armbar)	Wreck MMA 2.0	March 28, 2013	1	3:06	Gatineau, Quebec, Canada	Catchweight (118 lb) bout.
Win	1–0	Allanna Jones	Submission (armbar)	Impact Fight League 51	November 17, 2012	3	3:14	Auburn Hills, Michigan, United States	Strawweight debut.

== Mixed martial arts exhibition record ==
Exhibition record breakdown		
3 matches	2 wins	1 loss
By submission	1	1
By decision	1	0

Res.	Record	Opponent	Method	Event	Date	Round	Time	Location	Notes
Loss	2–1	Rose Namajunas	Submission (kimura)	The Ultimate Fighter: A Champion Will Be Crowned	December 10, 2014 (airdate)	1	2:44	Las Vegas, Nevada, United States	TUF 20 Semifinal round
Win	2–0	Felice Herrig	Submission (scarf-hold armlock)	The Ultimate Fighter: A Champion Will Be Crowned	December 3, 2014 (airdate)	1	2:46	Las Vegas, Nevada, United States	TUF 20 Quarterfinal round
Win	1–0	Tecia Torres	Decision (unanimous)	The Ultimate Fighter: A Champion Will Be Crowned	November 5, 2014 (airdate)	3	5:00	Las Vegas, Nevada, United States	TUF 20 Elimination round

== Amateur mixed martial arts record ==
Amateur record breakdown		
6 matches	4 wins	2 losses
By knockout	1	0
By submission	1	1
By decision	2	1

Res.	Record	Opponent	Method	Event	Date	Round	Time	Location	Notes
Win	4–2	Bernice Booth	TKO (punches)	XCC 64.5 - Battle at the Border 11	November 13, 2010	1	2:27	Port Huron, Michigan, United States	
Win	3–2	Bernice Booth	Submission (armbar)	XCC 64 - Battle at the Border 10	August 28, 2010	2	1:31	Walpole Island, Ontario, Canada	
Win	2–2	Alibeth Rall Milliron	Decision (unanimous)	IFL - Prepare for Impact	May 8, 2010	3	3:00	Auburn Hills, Michigan, United States	
Loss	1–2	Kelly Warren	Submission (rear-naked choke)	IFL - Malice at the Palace	January 30, 2010	2	2:35	Auburn Hills, Michigan, United States	
Loss	1–1	Kelly Warren	Decision (unanimous)	IFL - Righteous Rumble	November 14, 2009	3	3:00	Auburn Hills, Michigan, United States	
Win	1–0	Tanya Lohr	Decision (unanimous)	IFL - No Pain, No Gain	September 19, 2009	3	3:00	Rochester Hills, Michigan, United States	

== See also ==
- List of female mixed martial artists
- List of Canadian UFC fighters
