= Tecia Pennington =

American mixed martial artist (born 1989)

- Born: Tecia Lyn Torres Moncaio; August 16, 1989 (age 37); Fall River, Massachusetts, U.S.
- Other names: The Tiny Tornado
- Height: 5 ft 1 in (1.55 m)
- Weight: 115 lb (52 kg; 8.2 st)
- Division: Strawweight
- Reach: 60 1/2 in (154 cm)
- Style: Taekwondo, Muay Thai, Karate, Brazilian Jiu-Jitsu
- Fighting out of: Colorado Springs, U.S.
- Team: American Top Team
- Rank: Black belt in Karate; Black belt in Jhoon-Rhee Taekwondo; Blue belt in Brazilian Jiu-Jitsu
- Years active: 2011–2025

Mixed martial arts record
- Total: 23
- Wins: 15
- By knockout: 1
- By submission: 1
- By decision: 13
- Losses: 8
- By decision: 8

Amateur record
- Total: 7
- Wins: 7
- By submission: 2
- By decision: 5
- Losses: 0

Other information
- Spouse: Raquel Pennington (m. 2022)
- Mixed martial arts record from Sherdog

Tecia Pennington (née Torres Moncaio; born August 16, 1989) is an American former mixed martial artist who competed in the women's Strawweight division of the Ultimate Fighting Championship (UFC).

== Background ==
Pennington was born in Fall River, Massachusetts, but moved to Coral Springs with her single mom, older sister and a younger brother at the age of five. Torres has been involved in martial arts since age 3. She began in taekwondo as a child, and received her black belt after twelve years practicing the sport. She also has an amateur muay thai record of sixteen victories and four losses.

Pennington graduated at 20 years old in 2010 with a Bachelor of Arts, double majoring in Criminal Justice and Sociology from Florida Atlantic University. She earned her master's degree in Criminology from the same college in 2017.

She is of Puerto Rican, Portuguese and Irish descent. Her family has roots in Maunabo, Puerto Rico.

== Mixed martial arts career ==
=== Early career ===
Pennington started her amateur mixed martial arts career in 2011. She won each of her seven bouts, obtaining 115-pound titles in MMA Solutions, US Freedom Fighter Championship and American Battle Championships.

In 2012, Pennington moved to professional mixed martial arts and signed with Invicta Fighting Championships.

=== Invicta Fighting Championships ===
Pennington made her professional and promotional debut against Kaiyana Rain on October 6, 2012, at Invicta FC 3: Penne vs. Sugiyama. She won via unanimous decision.

Pennington faced Paige VanZant on January 5, 2013, at Invicta FC 4: Esparza vs. Hyatt, winning on all judges' score cards. She then won a unanimous decision over Rose Namajunas on July 13, 2013, at Invicta FC 6: Coenen vs. Cyborg. Her final bout of 2013 was against Felice Herrig on December 7, 2013, at Invicta FC 7: Honchak vs. Smith. She won via unanimous decision.

=== The Ultimate Fighter ===
"I want to become the champion and hold that belt. I don't want to just win a fight and then lose it in my next fight. I want to create the Tiny Tornado legacy."

— Pennington after signing with the UFC

In December 2013, Pennington was announced as one of 11 women signed by the Ultimate Fighting Championship (UFC) for its newly created strawweight division. It was also announced that she would compete as a cast member on The Ultimate Fighter reality series, as part of a tournament to crown the inaugural strawweight champion. In the season premiere of The Ultimate Fighter, Pennington was selected by Team Melendez with the second pick. Third-ranked Pennington was matched against #14 Randa Markos. She lost the fight by unanimous decision.

Pennington was the overall no. 3 seed in the tournament and picked second by coach Gilbert Melendez. She faced Randa Markos in the preliminary round of the show. In a surprise upset, Pennington lost the fight via unanimous decision over three rounds. She, however, was allowed back into the tournament when Justine Kish injured her knee in training. She was transferred to the team run by Anthony Pettis and defeated Bec Rawlings in the preliminary round by unanimous decision. She faced Carla Esparza in the quarter-finals and lost via majority decision in two rounds.

=== Ultimate Fighting Championship ===
Pennington made her UFC debut against fellow Ultimate Fighter competitor Angela Magaña at The Ultimate Fighter: A Champion Will Be Crowned Finale on December 12, 2014. She won the fight via dominant unanimous decision, out-striking Magaña two-to-one over the course of three rounds.

Pennington next faced TUF 20 alum Angela Hill on June 13, 2015, at UFC 188. She won the fight by unanimous decision.

Pennington was next expected to face former Invicta FC Atomweight Champion Michelle Waterson at UFC 194. However, Waterson pulled out of the bout on November 24, 2015, citing a knee injury. She was replaced by promotional newcomer Jocelyn Jones-Lybarger. Pennington won the fight by unanimous decision.

Pennington faced Rose Namajunas in a rematch on April 16, 2016, at UFC on Fox 19. She lost the fight via unanimous decision.

Pennington next faced Bec Rawlings in a rematch at UFC Fight Night: Bermudez vs. The Korean Zombie on February 4, 2017. At the weigh-ins, Rawlings came in at 117.5 lbs, over the women's strawweight limit of 116 lbs. As a result, Rawlings was fined 20% of her purse, which went to Pennington and the bout proceeded at a catchweight. Pennington won the fight by unanimous decision.

Pennington faced Juliana Lima on July 7, 2017, at The Ultimate Fighter 25 Finale. She won the fight via submission in the second round, making this the first stoppage victory in her professional career. The win also earned Pennington her first Performance of the Night bonus award.

Pennington faced Michelle Waterson on December 2, 2017, at UFC 218. She won the fight by unanimous decision.

Pennington faced Jéssica Andrade on February 24, 2018, at UFC on Fox 28. She lost the fight via unanimous decision.

Pennington faced former strawweight champion Joanna Jędrzejczyk on July 28, 2018, at UFC on Fox 30. She lost the fight by unanimous decision.

Pennington faced Zhang Weili on March 2, 2019, at UFC 235. She lost the fight via unanimous decision.

Pennington faced Marina Rodriguez on August 10, 2019, at UFC Fight Night 156. She lost the fight via unanimous decision.

Pennington was scheduled to face Mizuki Inoue on March 28, 2020, at UFC on ESPN: Ngannou vs. Rozenstruik. Due to the COVID-19 pandemic, the event was eventually postponed . Instead, Pennington face Brianna Van Buren on June 20, 2020, at UFC Fight Night: Blaydes vs. Volkov. She won the fight via unanimous decision.

A rematch with Angela Hill was expected to take place on December 12, 2020, at UFC 256. However, Hill tested positive for COVID-19 and pulled out of the fight. Pennington instead faced promotional newcomer Sam Hughes. She won the fight via doctor stoppage between round one and two after Hughes said she couldn't see out of one of her eyes.

The rematch with Angela Hill was rescheduled and took place on August 7, 2021, at UFC 265. Pennington won the fight via unanimous decision.

Pennington faced Mackenzie Dern on April 9, 2022, at UFC 273. Despite surviving deep submission attempts in the second round, Pennington lost the close bout via split decision.

Pennington faced Tabatha Ricci on May 11, 2024, at UFC on ESPN 56. She lost the fight by split decision.

Pennington faced former two-time UFC Women's Strawweight Champion Carla Esparza on October 5, 2024 at UFC 307. She won the fight by unanimous decision.

Pennington faced Luana Pinheiro on May 17, 2025 at UFC Fight Night 256. She won the fight by unanimous decision.

Pennington faced Denise Gomes on November 8, 2025 at UFC Fight Night 264. She lost the fight by unanimous decision.

On January 23, 2026, it was reported that Pennington was removed from the UFC roster and retired from mixed martial arts competition.

== Fighting style ==
Pennington employs constant lateral movement while combining elements of taekwondo and karate. She frequently utilizes kicking techniques, occasionally following a high or low kick with a fast side kick. When punching, she will often press forward with a flurry of high strikes. Pennington does not often utilize submission techniques, but has demonstrated submission defense.

== Personal life ==
Pennington is straight edge, claiming to have never used any alcohol, tobacco and other recreational drugs in her life. On the World Mental Health Day of 2019, Pennington revealed having struggled with her mental health issues – depression and attachment disorder – for several years. She is openly part of the LGBTQ+ community and is married to former UFC women's bantamweight champion, Raquel Pennington. The couple announced the birth of their baby daughter in June 2023.

== Championships and accomplishments ==
=== Mixed martial arts ===
- Ultimate Fighting Championship
  - Performance of the Night (One time) vs. Juliana Lima
  - Third most wins in UFC Women's Strawweight division history (11) (behind Angela Hill)
  - Second most decision wins in UFC Women's Strawweight division history (9) (behind Angela Hill)
  - Tied (Karolina Kowalkiewicz) for second most bouts in UFC Women's Strawweight division history (19)
- MMA Solutions Global
  - MMA Solutions amateur strawweight title (one time)
- US Freedom Fighter Championship
  - USFFC amateur strawweight title (one time)
- American Battle Championships
  - ABC amateur strawweight title (one time)
- Women's MMA Awards
  - 2013 Strawweight of the Year
- AwakeningFighters.com WMMA Awards
  - 2013 Strawweight of the Year
  - 2013 Newcomer of the Year
- Bleacher Report
  - 2013 WMMA Fight of the Year vs. Rose Namajunas on July 13

== Mixed martial arts record ==
Professional record breakdown
23 matches	15 wins	8 losses
By knockout	1	0
By submission	1	0
By decision	13	8

Res.	Record	Opponent	Method	Event	Date	Round	Time	Location	Notes
Loss	15–8	Denise Gomes	Decision (unanimous)	UFC Fight Night: Bonfim vs. Brown	November 8, 2025	3	5:00	Las Vegas, Nevada, United States	
Win	15–7	Luana Pinheiro	Decision (unanimous)	UFC Fight Night: Burns vs. Morales	May 17, 2025	3	5:00	Las Vegas, Nevada, United States	
Win	14–7	Carla Esparza	Decision (unanimous)	UFC 307	October 5, 2024	3	5:00	Salt Lake City, Utah, United States	
Loss	13–7	Tabatha Ricci	Decision (split)	UFC on ESPN: Lewis vs. Nascimento	May 11, 2024	3	5:00	St. Louis, Missouri, United States	
Loss	13–6	Mackenzie Dern	Decision (split)	UFC 273	April 9, 2022	3	5:00	Jacksonville, Florida, United States	
Win	13–5	Angela Hill	Decision (unanimous)	UFC 265	August 7, 2021	3	5:00	Houston, Texas, United States	
Win	12–5	Sam Hughes	TKO (doctor stoppage)	UFC 256	December 12, 2020	1	5:00	Las Vegas, Nevada, United States	
Win	11–5	Brianna Van Buren	Decision (unanimous)	UFC on ESPN: Blaydes vs. Volkov	June 20, 2020	3	5:00	Las Vegas, Nevada, United States	
Loss	10–5	Marina Rodriguez	Decision (unanimous)	UFC Fight Night: Shevchenko vs. Carmouche 2	August 10, 2019	3	5:00	Montevideo, Uruguay	
Loss	10–4	Zhang Weili	Decision (unanimous)	UFC 235	March 2, 2019	3	5:00	Las Vegas, Nevada, United States	
Loss	10–3	Joanna Jędrzejczyk	Decision (unanimous)	UFC on Fox: Alvarez vs. Poirier 2	July 28, 2018	3	5:00	Calgary, Alberta, Canada	
Loss	10–2	Jéssica Andrade	Decision (unanimous)	UFC on Fox: Emmett vs. Stephens	February 24, 2018	3	5:00	Orlando, Florida, United States	
Win	10–1	Michelle Waterson	Decision (unanimous)	UFC 218	December 2, 2017	3	5:00	Detroit, Michigan, United States	
Win	9–1	Juliana Lima	Submission (rear-naked choke)	The Ultimate Fighter: Redemption Finale	July 7, 2017	2	0:53	Las Vegas, Nevada, United States	Performance of the Night.
Win	8–1	Bec Rawlings	Decision (unanimous)	UFC Fight Night: Bermudez vs. The Korean Zombie	February 4, 2017	3	5:00	Houston, Texas, United States	Catchweight (117.5 lb) bout; Rawlings missed weight.
Loss	7–1	Rose Namajunas	Decision (unanimous)	UFC on Fox: Teixeira vs. Evans	April 16, 2016	3	5:00	Tampa, Florida, United States	
Win	7–0	Jocelyn Jones-Lybarger	Decision (unanimous)	UFC 194	December 12, 2015	3	5:00	Las Vegas, Nevada, United States	
Win	6–0	Angela Hill	Decision (unanimous)	UFC 188	June 13, 2015	3	5:00	Mexico City, Mexico	
Win	5–0	Angela Magaña	Decision (unanimous)	The Ultimate Fighter: A Champion Will Be Crowned Finale	December 12, 2014	3	5:00	Las Vegas, Nevada, United States	
Win	4–0	Felice Herrig	Decision (unanimous)	Invicta FC 7	December 7, 2013	3	5:00	Kansas City, Missouri, United States	
Win	3–0	Rose Namajunas	Decision (unanimous)	Invicta FC 6	July 13, 2013	3	5:00	Kansas City, Missouri, United States	
Win	2–0	Paige VanZant	Decision (unanimous)	Invicta FC 4	January 5, 2013	3	5:00	Kansas City, Kansas, United States	
Win	1–0	Kaiyana Rain	Decision (unanimous)	Invicta FC 3	October 6, 2012	3	5:00	Kansas City, Kansas, United States	Strawweight debut.

=== Mixed martial arts exhibition record ===
Exhibition record breakdown		
3 matches	1 win	2 losses
By decision	1	2

Res.	Record	Opponent	Method	Event	Date	Round	Time	Location	Notes
Loss	1–2	Carla Esparza	Decision (majority)	The Ultimate Fighter: A Champion Will Be Crowned	December 3, 2014 (airdate)	2	5:00	Las Vegas, Nevada, United States	TUF 20 Quarterfinal round.
Win	1–1	Bec Rawlings	Decision (unanimous)	The Ultimate Fighter: A Champion Will Be Crowned	November 12, 2014 (airdate)	2	5:00	Las Vegas, Nevada, United States	TUF 20 Elimination round. Torres was brought back into competition after an injury to another contestant.
Loss	0–1	Randa Markos	Decision (unanimous)	The Ultimate Fighter: A Champion Will Be Crowned	September 10, 2014 (airdate)	3	5:00	Las Vegas, Nevada, United States	TUF 20 Elimination round.

== See also ==
- List of female mixed martial artists
