= Angela Magaña =

American mixed martial artist (born 1983)

- Born: August 2, 1983 (age 43); Farmington, New Mexico, U.S.
- Other names: Your Majesty
- Height: 5 ft 1 in (1.55 m)
- Weight: 115 lb (52 kg; 8 st 3 lb)
- Division: Strawweight; Flyweight
- Reach: 66 in (170 cm)
- Years active: 2007–2018

Mixed martial arts record
- Total: 21
- Wins: 11
- By knockout: 2
- By submission: 6
- By decision: 3
- Losses: 10
- By knockout: 2
- By submission: 5
- By decision: 3

Other information
- Website: www.angelamaganas.com
- Mixed martial arts record from Sherdog

Angela Magaña (born August 2, 1983) is an American mixed martial artist who formerly competed in the strawweight division of the Ultimate Fighting Championship (UFC). She is also known for competing on The Ultimate Fighter 20 for Team Melendez.

== Early life ==
When Magaña was five, she lived in the streets of Los Angeles with her mother who was addicted to heroin. She slept in back alleys and ate out of garbage cans. Eventually her grandparents gained custody, but Magaña was already scarred with the issues she'd experienced. Her mother overdosed and died when Magaña turned 17. Magana's father is a Mexican national who was deported to Mexico when she was a child. At the age of 14, she was raped by the father of some children that she babysat for while the children's mother watched. The man was convicted for the crime and served 10 years of a 14-year sentence, while the wife was not charged with any crime.

In 2007, Magaña broke her back by falling down three stories of stairs. She has suffered two auto accidents, one of which put her in a coma for several days.

== Mixed martial arts career ==
Magaña started her MMA career on March 23, 2007 at Gladiator Challenge 60 against Tia Castillo. She won via TKO in the first round.

She suffered her first defeat when she tapped out to an armbar by Jessica Aguilar.

Magaña then submitted her next two opponents both by armbar. A rematch was set between her and Aguilar at WFC 6, she lost via technical submission.

After a split decision victory over Nicdali Rivera-Calanoc at FCF 19, Magaña defeated Aguilar in their trilogy fight in the first round of the HOOKnSHOOT GFight 2009 Grand Prix via majority decision.

Magaña fought Van do in the semi-finals. She won via rear-naked choke, and will face Lisa Hugo in the finals. She lost via unanimous decision.

After going 8-3 Magaña was set to face future Invicta FC Atomweight Champion Jessica Penne. She lost via submission.

She then went on a three fight win streak including a victory over Barb Honchak.

=== The Ultimate Fighter ===
Magaña took part as one of the Strawweights on TUF 20.

In her preliminary round bout, Magaña faced Irish stand out Aisling Daly. She lost via TKO in round three.

=== Ultimate Fighting Championship ===
Magaña made her UFC debut at The Ultimate Fighter 20 Finale taking on former teammate Tecia Torres. She lost via decision.

Magaña returned to the octagon to take on the debuting former Invicta FC Atomweight Champion Michelle Waterson at The Ultimate Fighter 21 Finale. She lost the fight via submission in the third round.

Angela Magaña fought in UFC 218 on December 2, 2017 against The Ultimate Fighter: Team Joanna vs. Team Cláudia runner-up Amanda Cooper. She lost the fight via TKO in the second round.

On December 3, 2017, Magaña publicly announced on Twitter that her contract with the UFC had been terminated after an 0–3 record.

=== Post-UFC career ===
Magana faced Kanako Murata at Rizin 12 on August 12, 2018. She lost the fight by Von Flue choke, 3:53 into the second round.

== Personal life ==
In April 2019, Magana was left in an unresponsive coma after complications following spinal surgery at University Hospital in San Juan, Puerto Rico. She woke up from her coma two days later.

== Mixed martial arts record ==
Professional record breakdown
21 matches	11 wins	10 losses
By knockout	2	2
By submission	6	5
By decision	3	3

Res.	Record	Opponent	Method	Event	Date	Round	Time	Location	Notes
Loss	11–10	Kanako Murata	Submission (Von Flue choke)	Rizin 12	August 12, 2018	2	3:53	Nagoya, Japan	
Loss	11–9	Amanda Cooper	TKO (punches)	UFC 218	December 2, 2017	2	4:32	Detroit, Michigan, United States	
Loss	11–8	Michelle Waterson	Submission (rear-naked choke)	The Ultimate Fighter: American Top Team vs. Blackzilians Finale	July 12, 2015	3	2:38	Las Vegas, Nevada, United States	
Loss	11–7	Tecia Torres	Decision (unanimous)	The Ultimate Fighter: A Champion Will Be Crowned Finale	December 12, 2014	3	5:00	Las Vegas, Nevada, United States	
Loss	11–6	Stephanie Eggink	Submission (triangle choke)	XFC 25: Boiling Point	September 6, 2013	2	3:10	Albuquerque, New Mexico, United States	For the XFC Strawweight Championship.
Loss	11–5	Jessica Eye	Decision (unanimous)	NAAFS: Rock N Rumble 6	August 17, 2012	3	5:00	Cleveland, Ohio, United States	Flyweight bout.
Win	11–4	Avery Vilche	Submission (armbar)	CITR: The New Generation	August 13, 2011	1	1:09	Ignacio, Colorado, United States	
Win	10–4	Elsie Zwicker	Submission (armbar)	MFA: New Generation 5	May 7, 2011	1	1:55	Miami, Florida, United States	
Win	9–4	Barb Honchak	Decision (split)	Ultimate Women Challenge	September 24, 2010	3	5:00	St George, Utah, United States	
Loss	8–4	Jessica Penne	Submission (rear-naked choke)	Action Fight League: Rock-N-Rumble	September 25, 2009	2	4:10	Hollywood, Florida, United States	
Win	8–3	Meghan Wright	Submission (armbar)	UCFC: Rumble on the Rivers	June 27, 2009	1	1:35	Pittsburgh, United States	
Win	7–3	Stephanie Palmer	TKO (punches)	CMF: Ground & Pound	June 20, 2009	1	1:33	Farmington, New Mexico, United States	
Loss	6–3	Lisa Higo	Decision (unanimous)	HOOKnSHOOT: GFight 2009 Grand Prix	January 16, 2009	3	3:00	Evansville, Indiana, United States	HOOKnSHOOT GFight 2009 115 lbs Grand Prix final.
Win	6–2	Van Do	Submission (rear-naked choke)	HOOKnSHOOT: GFight 2009 Grand Prix	January 16, 2009	1	1:48	Evansville, Indiana, United States	HOOKnSHOOT GFight 2009 115 lbs Grand Prix Semi-final.
Win	5–2	Jessica Aguilar	Decision (majority)	HOOKnSHOOT: GFight 2009 Grand Prix	January 16, 2009	3	3:00	Evansville, Indiana, United States	HOOKnSHOOT GFight 2009 115 lbs Grand Prix Quarterfinal.
Win	4–2	Nicdali Rivera-Calanoc	Decision (Split)	Freestyle Cage Fighting 19	May 31, 2008	3	3:00	Claremore, Oklahoma, United States	
Loss	3–2	Jessica Aguilar	TKO (blood in the eye)	WFC 6: Battle in the Bay	March 22, 2008	3	1:53	Tampa, Florida, United States	
Win	3–1	Lynn Alvarez	Submission (armbar)	Tuff-N-Uff: Thompson vs. Troyer	February 8, 2008	2	1:25	Tampa, Florida, United States	
Win	2–1	Crystal Harris	Submission (armbar)	Tuff-N-Uff 3	June 22, 2007	1	3:10	Las Vegas, Nevada, United States	
Loss	1–1	Jessica Aguilar	Submission (armbar)	WFC 3: Turf Wars	April 7, 2007	1	3:09	Tampa, Florida, United States	
Win	1–0	Tia Castillo	TKO (punches)	GC 60: Invasion	March 23, 2007	1	1:43	Farmington, New Mexico, United States	

== Mixed martial arts exhibition record ==
Professional record breakdown
1 match	0 wins	1 loss
By knockout	0	1

Res.	Record	Opponent	Method	Event	Date	Round	Time	Location	Notes
Loss	0–1	Aisling Daly	TKO (punches)	The Ultimate Fighter: A Champion Will Be Crowned	October 29, 2014 (airdate)	3	2:34	Las Vegas, Nevada, United States	TUF 20 Elimination round

== Championships and achievements ==
=== Mixed martial arts ===
- 2009 HOOKnSHOOT Women's Grand Prix Runner-up
