= Aisling Daly =

Irish martial artist (born 1987)

- Born: Aisling Daly; 24 December 1987 (age 38); Drimnagh, Dublin, Ireland
- Other names: Ais the Bash
- Height: 5 ft 3 in (1.60 m)
- Weight: 115 lb (52 kg; 8.2 st)
- Division: Strawweight; Flyweight
- Style: Brazilian Jiu-Jitsu; Muay Thai
- Fighting out of: Dublin, Ireland
- Team: Team KF Martial Arts, Swords, Ireland; Straight Blast Gym Ireland
- Trainer: Tom King (2nd Degree Brazilian Jiu Jitsu Black Belt
- Rank: Black belt in Brazilian Jiu-Jitsu under Matt Thornton under John Kavanagh
- Years active: 2007–2015

Mixed martial arts record
- Total: 22
- Wins: 16
- By knockout: 5
- By submission: 8
- By decision: 3
- Losses: 6
- By knockout: 1
- By decision: 5

Other information
- Mixed martial arts record from Sherdog

Aisling Daly (/ˈæʃlɪŋ ˈdeɪli/ ASH-ling DAY-lee; born 24 December 1987) is a retired Irish female professional mixed martial artist who last competed in the UFC women's strawweight division. Daly had been a professional MMA competitor since 2007.

Daly is well known for her participation in the reality TV series "The Ultimate Fighter: A Champion Will Be Crowned", season 20. The 12 episodes featured a single elimination tournament that was used to determine two finalists to compete for the first ever UFC woman's straw weight belt. Daly was eliminated in the quarterfinals, and as a result of her showing was offered and accepted a fight on the undercard of the championship fight, which she won.

Daly has competed in several divisions, including strawweight and flyweight. Daly has trained throughout her career at Straight Blast Gym Ireland, under SBGi head coach John Kavanagh. She received her Black Belt in Brazilian Jiu-Jitsu from SBG head coach Matt Thornton in October 2016, becoming the first Irish female to earn the prestige.

On 30 January 2017 she officially retired from MMA due to an abnormality in a routine brain scan making it unlikely for her to be cleared to fight again.

== Mixed martial arts career ==
=== Early career ===
Daly began her professional career in Denmark against Nicole Sydboge, defeating her in the second round via guillotine choke. This was followed up by a win over Annika Sitter via TKO after 22 seconds.

=== Cage Rage ===
Daly then signed with Cage Rage and debuted against Majanka Lathouwers. Daly won the fight by armbar submission in the second round. She later competed outside of Cage Rage against Nadia van der Wel and won the fight by TKO.

Daly returned at Cage Rage 25 and defeated Aysen Berik, younger sister of Cage Rage veteran Sami Berik, via corner stoppage less than two minutes into the fight, making her the first woman to win a professional bout in Cage Rage. She then fought at Cage Rage Contenders and won via TKO, which was followed up by a win at Cage Rage 27 via rear naked choke.

Daly then made two more appearances after Cage Rage's dissolution, winning one via decision and another via TKO.

=== Bellator Fighting championships ===
Ranked as the number three female flyweight in the world and the top female mixed martial artist in Ireland, Daly signed with Bellator to compete in their women's 115 lbs tournament.

Her opening round fight was against Lisa Ellis at Bellator 26. She lost the fight via unanimous decision.

On 10 April 2011, it was announced that Daly had been released from her Bellator contract.

Daly was scheduled to return to the promotion at Bellator 66 on 20 April 2012 to face Jessica Eye in an NAAFS title rematch. However, Daly was forced to withdraw from the fight due to an ear infection.

=== Outside of Bellator ===
Daly faced Molly Helsel at Cage Warriors Fighting Championship 39 on 27 November 2010 in Cork, Ireland. She won the fight via unanimous decision.

Daly faced German Sheila Gaff at Cage Warriors Fighting Championship 41 on 24 April 2011 in North London, England. She was defeated by TKO in the first round.

She next faced Jessica Eye at NAAFS: Fight Night In The Flats 7 on 4 June 2011 in Cleveland, Ohio. Daly defeated Eye by submission due to a rear-naked choke in the second round to become NAAFS 125 lbs women's champion.

On three days' notice, Daly agreed to face Angela Hayes at Cage Warriors Fighting Championship: Fight Night 2 on 8 September 2011 in Amman, Jordan. Daly replaced Sheila Gaff, who withdrew from the fight due to illness. She defeated Hayes by armbar submission in 20 seconds.

Daly was scheduled to face Roxanne Modafferi at BlackEye Promotions 5 on 1 October 2011 in Fletcher, North Carolina. However, she was forced to withdraw from the fight due to contractual obligations to NAAFS and instead defended her title against Kelly Warren at NAAFS: Night of Champions 2011 on 23 November 2011 in Canton, Ohio. Daly defeated Warren by submission due to an armbar in the second round.

Daly had planned to compete in Ireland on 24 March 2012 at Battlezone Fighting Championships 5, but her fight was cancelled when opponent Titiana van Polanen Petel suffered a shoulder injury.

On 2 June 2012, Daly faced Rosi Sexton at Cage Warriors Fighting Championship 47. The bout was part of a tournament to crown a Cage Warriors 125-pound women's champion. Daly was defeated by unanimous decision.

Daly next competed in a 120 lbs catchweight bout against Katja Kankaanpää at Cage Warriors Fighting Championship 51 on 31 December 2012. She was defeated by unanimous decision.

=== Invicta Fighting championships ===
Daly faced Barb Honchak at Invicta Fighting Championships 3 on 6 October 2012. She was defeated via unanimous decision.

=== Ultimate Fighting Championship ===
==== The Ultimate Fighter ====
On 3 July 2014, it was announced that Daly was one of the eight remaining contestants on The Ultimate Fighter: Team Pettis vs. Team Melendez.

In the first episode of The Ultimate Fighter: Team Pettis vs. Team Melendez it was revealed that the UFC had seeded the fighters. Aisling was seeded 5th of 16 fighters and was paired with the no. 12 seed, Angela Magaña, who she fought in the preliminary round. Daly won the fight via TKO in the third round to advance in the tournament. She was defeated by no. 4 seed Jessica Penne in the quarterfinals via unanimous decision in 3 rounds.

==== After TUF ====
Daly's first fight after The Ultimate Fighter was against Alex Chambers at The Ultimate Fighter: A Champion Will Be Crowned Finale on 12 December 2014. She was successful in her debut, winning by submission in the first round.

Daly was expected to face Cláudia Gadelha on 11 April 2015 at UFC Fight Night 64. However, Gadelha pulled out of the bout in late March citing a recent muscle spasm in her back. Subsequently, Daly was pulled from the card entirely. In turn, she was quickly re-booked and faced Randa Markos on 25 April 2015 at UFC 186. Daly lost the fight by unanimous decision.

Daly next faced Ericka Almeida on 24 October 2015 at UFC Fight Night: Holohan vs. Smolka. She won the fight by unanimous decision.

On 30 January 2017 Daly announced her retirement following medical tests that revealed an abnormality as a result of a prior brain haemorrhage.

== Mixed martial arts record ==
Professional record breakdown
22 matches	16 wins	6 losses
By knockout	5	1
By submission	8	0
By decision	3	5

Res.	Record	Opponent	Method	Event	Date	Round	Time	Location	Notes
Win	16–6	Ericka Almeida	Decision (unanimous)	UFC Fight Night: Holohan vs. Smolka	24 October 2015	3	5:00	Dublin, Ireland	
Loss	15–6	Randa Markos	Decision (unanimous)	UFC 186	25 April 2015	3	5:00	Montreal, Quebec, Canada	
Win	15–5	Alex Chambers	Submission (armbar)	The Ultimate Fighter: A Champion Will Be Crowned Finale	12 December 2014	1	4:53	Las Vegas, Nevada, United States	Catchweight (118 lbs) bout; Daly missed weight.
Win	14–5	Karla Benitez	Submission (armbar)	Cage Warriors 63	31 December 2013	2	4:26	Dublin, Ireland	Strawweight debut.
Loss	13–5	Katja Kankaanpää	Decision (unanimous)	Cage Warriors: 51	31 December 2012	3	5:00	Dublin, Ireland	Catchweight (120 lbs) bout.
Loss	13–4	Barb Honchak	Decision (unanimous)	Invicta FC 3: Penne vs. Sugiyama	6 October 2012	3	5:00	Kansas City, Kansas, United States	
Loss	13–3	Rosi Sexton	Decision (unanimous)	Cage Warriors: 47	2 June 2012	3	5:00	Dublin, Ireland	CWFC Women's Flyweight Tournament Semi-final
Win	13–2	Kelly Warren	Submission (armbar)	NAAFS: Night of Champions 2011	23 November 2011	2	4:39	Canton, Ohio, United States	Defended NAAFS 125 lbs Women's Championship
Win	12–2	Angela Hayes	Submission (armbar)	Cage Warriors: Fight Night 2	8 September 2011	1	0:20	Amman, Jordan	
Win	11–2	Jessica Eye	Submission (rear-naked choke)	NAAFS: Fight Night In The Flats 7	4 June 2011	2	4:00	Cleveland, Ohio, United States	Won NAAFS 125 lbs Women's Championship
Loss	10–2	Sheila Gaff	TKO (knees and punches)	Cage Warriors: 41	24 April 2011	1	1:34	North London, United Kingdom	
Win	10–1	Molly Helsel	Decision (unanimous)	Cage Warriors 39: The Uprising	27 November 2010	3	5:00	Cork, Ireland	
Loss	9–1	Lisa Ellis	Decision (unanimous)	Bellator 26	26 August 2010	3	5:00	Kansas City, Missouri, United States	
Win	9–0	Maiju Kujala	Decision (unanimous)	Rumble in Rush 2	7 November 2009	3	5:00	Dublin, Ireland	
Win	8–0	Tevi Say	TKO (punches)	Cage of Truth 4	22 November 2008	1	2:30	Dublin, Ireland	
Win	7–0	Eva Liskova	Submission (rear-naked choke)	Cage Rage 27	12 July 2008	1	1:18	London, United Kingdom	
Win	6–0	Myriem el Banouti	TKO (punches)	Cage Rage Contenders - Ireland vs. Belgium	3 May 2008	1	1:38	Dublin, Ireland	
Win	5–0	Aysen Berik	TKO (corner stoppage)	Cage Rage 25	8 March 2008	1	1:49	London, United Kingdom	
Win	4–0	Nadia van der Wel	TKO (punches)	COT 1 – Battle on the Bay	24 November 2007	2	2:39	Dublin, Ireland	
Win	3–0	Myriem Lathouwers	Submission (armbar)	Cage Rage Contenders: Dynamite	29 September 2007	2	4:43	Dublin, Ireland	
Win	2–0	Annika Sitter	TKO (punches)	ROT 7 – The Next Level	28 July 2007	1	0:22	Dublin, Ireland	
Win	1–0	Nicole Sydboge	Submission (guillotine choke)	Adrenaline 1 – Feel the Rush	5 May 2007	2	1:00	Hvidovre, Denmark	

=== Mixed martial arts exhibition record ===
Exhibition record breakdown		
2 matches	1 win	1 loss
By knockout	1	0
By decision	0	1

Res.	Record	Opponent	Method	Event	Date	Round	Time	Location	Notes
Loss	1–1	Jessica Penne	Decision (unanimous)	The Ultimate Fighter: A Champion Will Be Crowned	26 November 2014 (airdate)	3	5:00	Las Vegas, Nevada, United States	TUF 20 Quarterfinal round
Win	1–0	Angela Magaña	TKO (punches)	The Ultimate Fighter: A Champion Will Be Crowned	29 October 2014 (airdate)	3	2:34	Las Vegas, Nevada, United States	TUF 20 Elimination round

== Championships and accomplishments ==
- North American Allied Fight Series
  - NAAFS 125 lbs Women's Champion (One time; current)
    - One successful title defense
- Bleacher Report
  - 2015 Feel-Good Moment of the Year vs. Ericka Almeida at UFC Fight Night: Holohan vs. Smolka

== See also ==
- List of Irish UFC fighters
- List of current UFC fighters
- List of female mixed martial artists
