= Karolina Kowalkiewicz =

Polish mixed martial artist (born 1985)

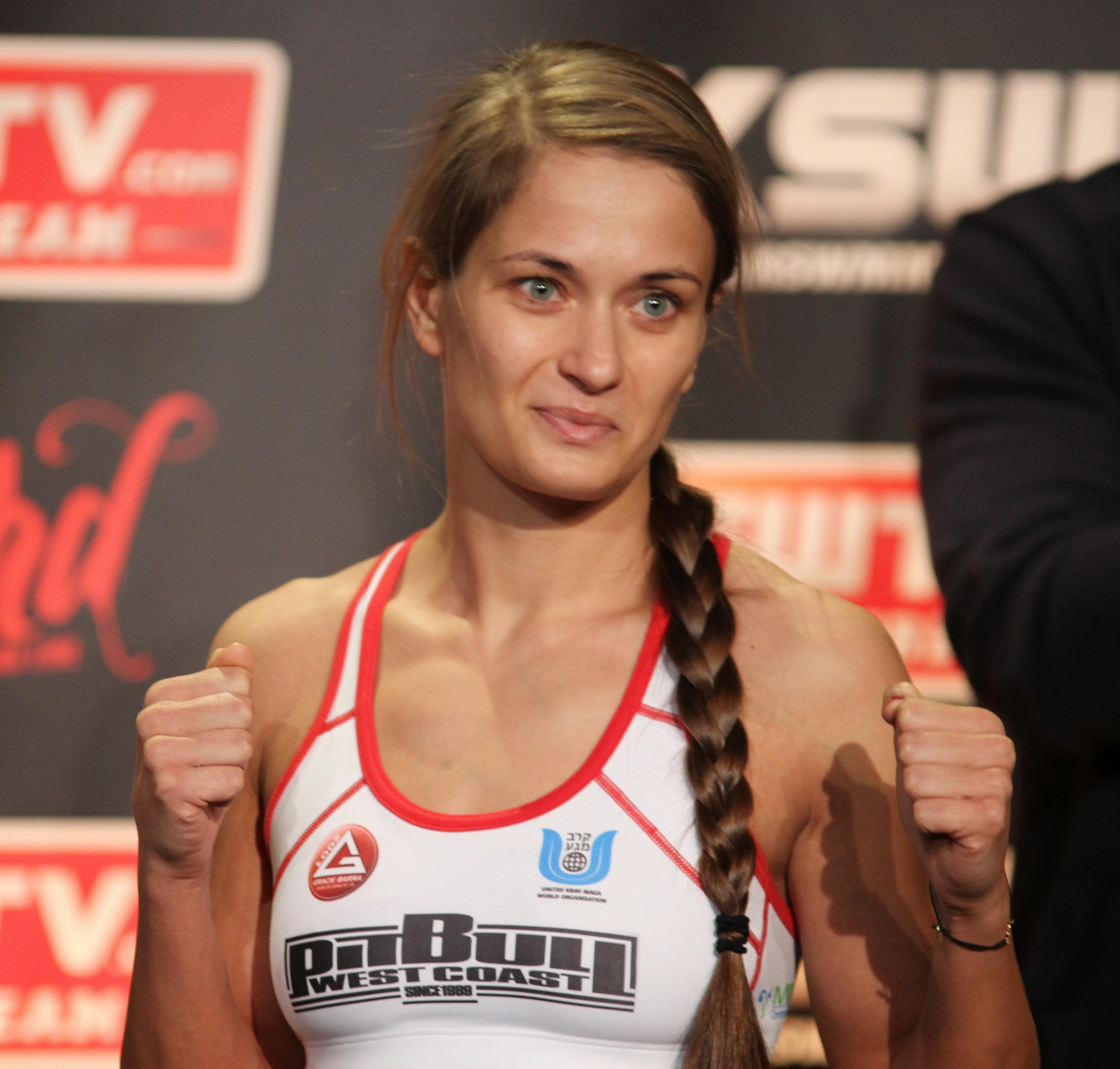
- Born: October 15, 1985 (age 41); Łódź, Poland
- Height: 5 ft 3 in (160 cm)
- Weight: 116 lb (53 kg; 8 st 4 lb)
- Division: Strawweight (2014–present); Flyweight (2012–2014)
- Reach: 64 in (163 cm)
- Fighting out of: Łódź, Poland
- Team: Shark Top Team Łódź
- Trainer: Łukasz Zaborowski
- Years active: 2012–present

Mixed martial arts record
- Total: 26
- Wins: 16
- By knockout: 1
- By submission: 3
- By decision: 12
- Losses: 10
- By knockout: 2
- By submission: 2
- By decision: 6

Amateur record
- Total: 1
- Losses: 1

Other information
- Mixed martial arts record from Sherdog

Karolina Kowalkiewicz (born October 15, 1985) is a Polish mixed martial artist. She currently competes in the women's Strawweight division of the Ultimate Fighting Championship (UFC). She is the former KSW Women's Flyweight Champion.

== Mixed martial arts career ==
=== Early career ===
Kowalkiewicz began her mixed martial arts career at the age of sixteen when she began training in Krav Maga. She later trained in Muay Thai and decided to make it a career. She fought two amateur fights before turning pro.

Kowalkiewicz made her professional debut in her native Poland in May 2012. Over the next three-and-a-half years she amassed an undefeated record of seven wins against no losses. She fought primarily for the Poland-based KSW promotion - where she was the Flyweight champion - and also made her U.S. debut for Invicta FC in November 2014.

=== Ultimate Fighting Championship ===
In late October 2015, it was announced that Kowalkiewicz had signed with the UFC. She faced Randa Markos on December 19, 2015 at UFC on FOX 17. She was successful in her debut, winning the fight by unanimous decision.

Kowalkiewicz next faced Heather Jo Clark on May 8, 2016 at UFC Fight Night 87 in Rotterdam, Netherlands. She won the fight via unanimous decision.

Kowalkiewicz defeated Rose Namajunas by split decision on July 30, 2016 at UFC 201 to earn the next title shot at then-champion Joanna Jędrzejczyk. This performance earned her a Fight of the Night bonus.

Kowalkiewicz fought for the Strawweight title and lost to champion Joanna Jędrzejczyk by unanimous decision on November 12, 2016 at UFC 205.

Kowalkiewicz faced Cláudia Gadelha on June 3, 2017 in the co-main event at UFC 212. She lost the fight via submission due to a rear-naked choke in the first round.

Kowalkiewicz faced Jodie Esquibel on October 21, 2017 at UFC Fight Night 118. She won the fight by unanimous decision.

Kowalkiewicz faced Felice Herrig on April 7, 2018 at UFC 223. She won the fight by split decision.

Kowalkiewicz fought Jéssica Andrade on September 8, 2018 at UFC 228. She lost the fight by knockout in the first round.

Kowalkiewicz faced Michelle Waterson at UFC on ESPN 2 on March 30, 2019. She lost the fight via unanimous decision.

Kowalkiewicz faced Alexa Grasso on June 8, 2019 at UFC 238. She lost the fight via unanimous decision.

Kowalkiewicz faced Yan Xiaonan on February 23, 2020 at UFC Fight Night 168. She lost the fight by unanimous decision.

Kowalkiewicz faced Jessica Penne on August 7, 2021 at UFC 265. She lost the fight via an armbar in round one.

After a one-year hiatus, Kowalkiewicz faced Felice Herrig on June 4, 2022, at UFC Fight Night 207. Kowalkiewicz snapped a 5 bout losing streak, submitting Herrig via rear-naked choke in the second round.

Kowalkiewicz faced Silvana Gómez Juárez on November 12, 2022, at UFC 281. She won the fight via unanimous decision.

Kowalkiewicz faced Vanessa Demopoulos on May 20, 2023 at UFC Fight Night 223. At the weigh-ins, Demopoulos weighed in at 117.5 pounds, one and half pounds over the women's strawweight non-title fight limit. The bout proceed at catchweight and Demopoulos was fined 20 percent of her purse, which went to Kowalkiewicz. Kowalkiewicz won the fight via unanimous decision.

Kowalkiewicz faced Diana Belbiţă at UFC Fight Night 229 on October 7, 2023. She won the fight via unanimous decision.

Kowalkiewicz faced Iasmin Lucindo at UFC 301 on May 4, 2024. She lost the fight via unanimous decision.

Kowalkiewicz faced Denise Gomes on November 9, 2024 at UFC Fight Night 247. She lost the fight by unanimous decision.

Kowalkiewicz faced Julia Polastri on October 11, 2025 at UFC Fight Night 261. She lost the fight by technical knockout via a head kick and punches in the third round.

Kowalkiewicz is scheduled to face Sam Hughes on January 16, 2027 at UFC Fight Night 296.

== Championships and accomplishments ==
=== Mixed martial arts ===
- Ultimate Fighting Championship
  - Fight of the Night (One time) vs. Rose Namajunas
  - Tied (Tecia Pennington) for second most bouts in UFC Women's Strawweight division history (19)
- Invicta Fighting Championships
  - Fight of the Night (One time)
- Konfrontacja Sztuk Walki
  - KSW Flyweight Championship (One title defense)
  - Fight of the Night (One time)

== Personal life ==
In 2019, Kowalkiewicz was diagnosed with Hashimoto's disease. To cope with the symptoms Kowalkiewicz now works with an endocrinologist and has adopted a vegan diet.

In 2020, during the match with Yan Xiaonan she got a severe eye injury in the first round, yet she fought the remaining rounds with the injury. Her injuries were so severe that she couldn't return home from New Zealand, forced to wear an eye patch and stay for a few days. On Instagram she commented on the injury: "First time in my life after a fight, I cannot say I'm okay. Like you see, at the beginning of the first round, I have broken small bone here. I couldn't see nothing. My vision was double and everything was like in the fog." She later had surgery which involved the insertion of a titanium plate in her right eye.

== Mixed martial arts record ==
Professional record breakdown
26 matches	16 wins	10 losses
By knockout	1	2
By submission	3	2
By decision	12	6

Res.	Record	Opponent	Method	Event	Date	Round	Time	Location	Notes
Loss	16–10	Julia Polastri	TKO (head kick and punches)	UFC Fight Night: Oliveira vs. Gamrot	October 11, 2025	3	2:56	Rio de Janeiro, Brazil	
Loss	16–9	Denise Gomes	Decision (unanimous)	UFC Fight Night: Magny vs. Prates	November 9, 2024	3	5:00	Las Vegas, Nevada, United States	
Loss	16–8	Iasmin Lucindo	Decision (unanimous)	UFC 301	May 4, 2024	3	5:00	Rio de Janeiro, Brazil	
Win	16–7	Diana Belbiţă	Decision (unanimous)	UFC Fight Night: Dawson vs. Green	October 7, 2023	3	5:00	Las Vegas, Nevada, United States	
Win	15–7	Vanessa Demopoulos	Decision (unanimous)	UFC Fight Night: Dern vs. Hill	May 20, 2023	3	5:00	Las Vegas, Nevada, United States	Catchweight (117.5 lb) bout; Demopoulos missed weight.
Win	14–7	Silvana Gómez Juárez	Decision (unanimous)	UFC 281	November 12, 2022	3	5:00	New York City, New York, United States	
Win	13–7	Felice Herrig	Submission (rear-naked choke)	UFC Fight Night: Volkov vs. Rozenstruik	June 4, 2022	2	4:01	Las Vegas, Nevada, United States	
Loss	12–7	Jessica Penne	Submission (armbar)	UFC 265	August 7, 2021	1	4:32	Houston, Texas, United States	
Loss	12–6	Yan Xiaonan	Decision (unanimous)	UFC Fight Night: Felder vs. Hooker	February 23, 2020	3	5:00	Auckland, New Zealand	
Loss	12–5	Alexa Grasso	Decision (unanimous)	UFC 238	June 8, 2019	3	5:00	Chicago, Illinois, United States	
Loss	12–4	Michelle Waterson	Decision (unanimous)	UFC on ESPN: Barboza vs. Gaethje	March 30, 2019	3	5:00	Philadelphia, Pennsylvania, United States	
Loss	12–3	Jéssica Andrade	KO (punch)	UFC 228	September 8, 2018	1	1:58	Dallas, Texas, United States	
Win	12–2	Felice Herrig	Decision (split)	UFC 223	April 7, 2018	3	5:00	Brooklyn, New York, United States	
Win	11–2	Jodie Esquibel	Decision (unanimous)	UFC Fight Night: Cowboy vs. Till	October 21, 2017	3	5:00	Gdańsk, Poland	
Loss	10–2	Cláudia Gadelha	Submission (rear-naked choke)	UFC 212	June 3, 2017	1	3:03	Rio de Janeiro, Brazil	
Loss	10–1	Joanna Jędrzejczyk	Decision (unanimous)	UFC 205	November 12, 2016	5	5:00	New York City, New York, United States	For the UFC Women's Strawweight Championship.
Win	10–0	Rose Namajunas	Decision (split)	UFC 201	July 30, 2016	3	5:00	Atlanta, Georgia, United States	UFC Women's Strawweight title eliminator. Fight of the Night.
Win	9–0	Heather Jo Clark	Decision (unanimous)	UFC Fight Night: Overeem vs. Arlovski	May 8, 2016	3	5:00	Rotterdam, Netherlands	
Win	8–0	Randa Markos	Decision (unanimous)	UFC on Fox: dos Anjos vs. Cowboy 2	December 19, 2015	3	5:00	Orlando, Florida, United States	
Win	7–0	Kalindra Faria	Decision (split)	KSW 30	February 21, 2015	3	5:00	Poznań, Poland	Non-title bout. Fight of the Night.
Win	6–0	Mizuki Inoue	Decision (split)	Invicta FC 9	November 1, 2014	3	5:00	Davenport, Iowa, United States	Strawweight debut. Fight of the Night.
Win	5–0	Jasminka Cive	Submission (armbar)	KSW 27	May 17, 2014	1	3:53	Gdańsk, Poland	Defended the KSW Flyweight Championship. Submission of the Night.
Win	4–0	Simona Soukupova	Decision (unanimous)	KSW 24	September 28, 2013	3	5:00	Łódź, Poland	Catchweight (119 lb) bout.
Win	3–0	Marta Chojnoska	Submission (rear-naked choke)	KSW 23	June 8, 2013	1	1:11	Gdańsk, Poland	Won the 2012 KSW Women's Flyweight Tournament and the inaugural KSW Flyweight Championship.
Win	2–0	Paulina Bońkowska	Decision (unanimous)	KSW 21	December 1, 2012	3	5:00	Warsaw, Poland	Flyweight debut. 2012 KSW Women's Flyweight Tournament Semifinal. Fight of the Night.
Win	1–0	Marzena Wojas	TKO (punches)	Extreme Fighting Sports 2	May 18, 2012	1	3:12	Gdynia, Poland	Catchweight (132 lb) bout.

=== Amateur mixed martial arts record ===
Amateur record breakdown		
1 match	0 wins	1 loss
By submission	0	1

Res.	Record	Opponent	Method	Event	Date	Round	Time	Location	Notes
Loss	0–1	Joanna Jędrzejczyk	Submission (rear-naked choke)	Amateur League MMA 18	March 4, 2012	1	4:18	Sochaczew, Poland	
