= Alexa Grasso =

Mexican mixed martial artist (born 1993)

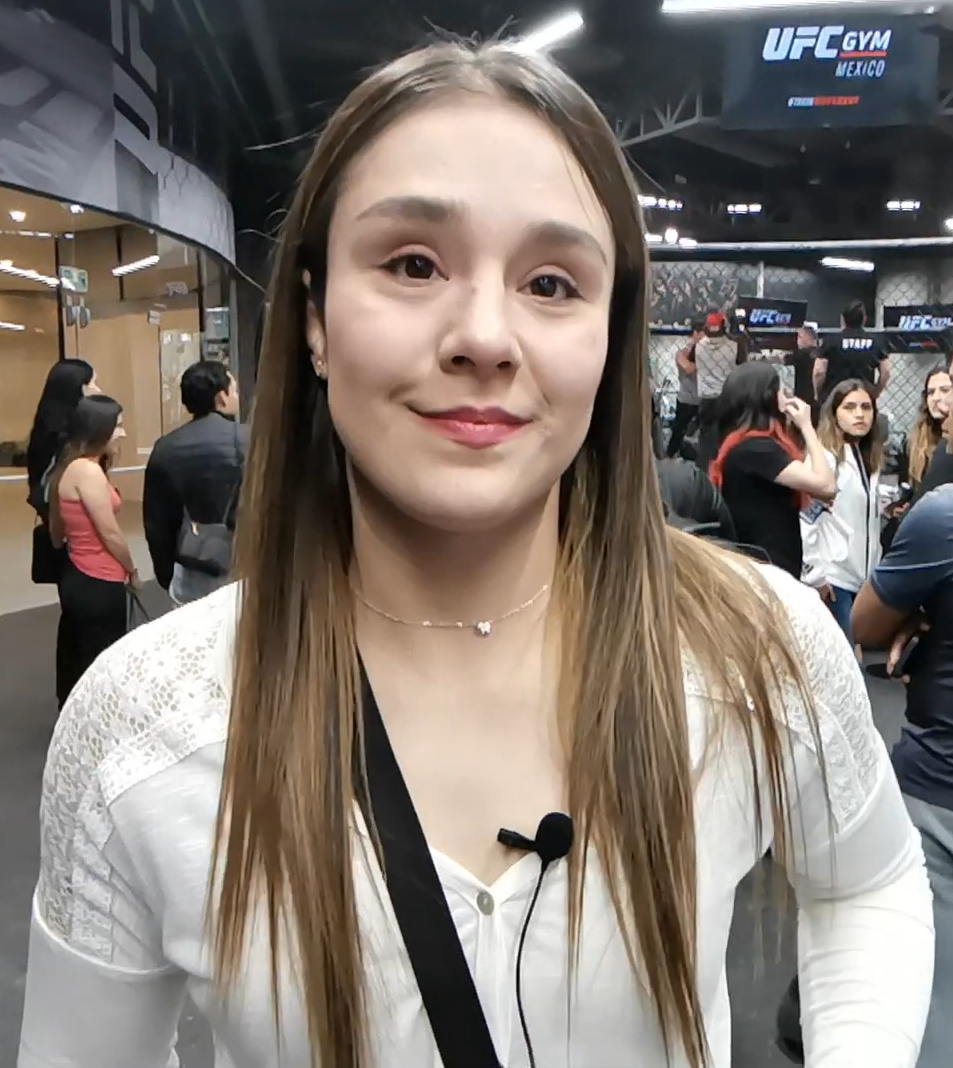
- Grasso in 2020
- Born: Karen Alexa Grasso Montes; August 9, 1993 (age 33); Guadalajara, Jalisco, Mexico
- Height: 5 ft 5 in (1.65 m)
- Weight: 125 lb (57 kg; 8.9 st)
- Division: Strawweight (2012–2020); Flyweight (2020–present)
- Reach: 66 in (168 cm)
- Fighting out of: Guadalajara, Jalisco, Mexico
- Team: Lobo Gym MMA
- Trainer: Francisco “Pancho” Grasso; Diego Lopes (BJJ)
- Rank: Brown belt in Brazilian Jiu-Jitsu
- Years active: 2012–present

Mixed martial arts record
- Total: 24
- Wins: 18
- By knockout: 5
- By submission: 2
- By decision: 11
- Losses: 5
- By submission: 1
- By decision: 4
- Draws: 1

Other information
- Mixed martial arts record from Sherdog

Karen Alexa Grasso Montes (born August 9, 1993) is a Mexican professional mixed martial artist who currently competes in the women's Flyweight division of the Ultimate Fighting Championship (UFC), where she is a former UFC Women's Flyweight Champion. Grasso is the first Mexican female fighter to win a UFC championship. She is also a UFC analyst for UFC Español for Spanish broadcasts. As of September 12, 2026, she is #2 in the Meta UFC women's flyweight rankings and as of September 15, 2026, she is #6 in the UFC women's pound-for-pound rankings.

== Early life ==
Karen Alexa Grasso Montes was born in Guadalajara, Mexico, on August 3, 1993. Her connection to martial arts began at a young age, as Grasso's father and uncle fought, trained, and taught martial arts. In her teens, they opened the family's first martial arts academy, Grasso Xtreme Training, which later became Lobo Gym. Alexa divided her time between school and the academy, helping out at reception and teaching children.

Grasso went on to accumulate Brazilian Jiu-Jitsu titles, competing at the regional and national levels. She was a three-time national Jiu-Jitsu champion, all in the white and blue belt divisions, twice without a gi and once with a gi. In one of these national championships, she competed alongside fellow Mexican UFC fighter Irene Aldana, and both finished first in their respective weight classes.

Grasso studied Physical Education and Sports at the UTEG University Center in Guadalajara. In August 2016, she was a year and a half away from graduating. However, she ended up interrupting her studies to dedicate herself fully to MMA.

== Mixed martial arts career ==
=== Early career ===
Grasso made her professional MMA debut in December 2012 in her native Mexico. During the first eighteen months of her career, she amassed an undefeated record of 5 wins (3 by TKO, 2 by decision) and 0 losses.

=== Invicta FC ===
After taking a year away from the sport, Grasso made her Invicta FC debut on September 6, 2014, against Ashley Cummins at Invicta FC 8. She won the fight via unanimous decision.

In her second fight for the promotion, Grasso faced Alida Gray on December 5, 2014, at Invicta FC 10. She won the fight via TKO in the first round.

Grasso next faced Mizuki Inoue on February 27, 2015, in the co-main event at Invicta FC 11. She won the fight by unanimous decision. The bout also earned Grasso her first Fight of the Night bonus award.

Grasso was expected to challenge Livia Renata Souza for the Invicta Strawweight Title at Invicta FC 14 on 12 September 2015 but was forced to withdraw due to injury.

=== Ultimate Fighting Championship ===
On August 11, 2016, it was announced that Grasso had signed with the Ultimate Fighting Championship (UFC). She faced Heather Jo Clark on November 5, 2016, at The Ultimate Fighter Latin America 3 Finale: dos Anjos vs. Ferguson in Mexico City, Mexico. She won the fight by unanimous decision.

Grasso next faced Felice Herrig on February 4, 2017, at UFC Fight Night 104. She lost the fight by unanimous decision, marking the first defeat in her professional career.

On August 5, 2017, Grasso faced Randa Markos at UFC Fight Night: Pettis vs. Moreno. Grasso suffered from a urinary tract infection and was medically advised to stop cutting weight and be placed on antibiotics, as a result she came in at 119 lbs, three pounds over the strawweight limit and was fined 20% of her purse that went to Markos. The bout proceeded at a catchweight. Grasso won the fight via split decision.

Grasso faced Tatiana Suarez on May 19, 2018, at UFC Fight Night 129. She lost the fight via a rear-naked choke in round one.

Grasso was scheduled to face Angela Hill on August 25, 2018, at UFC Fight Night 135. However, Grasso was pulled out from the bout on July 19, 2018, due to knee injury.

Grasso was expected to face Marina Rodriguez on February 2, 2019, at UFC Fight Night 144. However, it was reported on December 17, 2018, that Rodriguez pulled out of the event due to a hand injury. The pair was rescheduled to UFC on ESPN 2. However, on March 22, 2019, it was reported Grasso was injured and she was replaced by Jessica Aguilar.

Grasso faced Karolina Kowalkiewicz on June 8, 2019, at UFC 238. She won the fight by unanimous decision.

Grasso faced Carla Esparza on September 21, 2019, at UFC on ESPN+ 17. She lost the fight by majority decision, although the result was not without controversy. This fight earned her the Fight of the Night award.

Grasso was scheduled to face Cláudia Gadelha on January 18, 2020, at UFC 246. However, on the day of the weigh-ins, Grasso weighed in at 121.5, 5.5 pounds over the non-title strawweight limit of 116 lbs. The NSAC decided to remove the fight because competitors are not allowed to compete if the weight between them is over 3 pounds. In a statement released just hours after the weigh-ins, Grasso apologized for missing weight, and declared she will now be fighting at flyweight.

==== Move up to flyweight ====
Grasso was scheduled to face Ji Yeon Kim on June 27, 2020, at UFC on ESPN: Poirier vs. Hooker. However, due to travel restrictions for both fighters due to COVID-19 pandemic, the bout was rescheduled on August 29, 2020, at UFC Fight Night 175. She won the fight via unanimous decision.

Grasso faced Maycee Barber on February 13, 2021, at UFC 258. She won the fight via unanimous decision.

Grasso was scheduled to face Joanne Wood on November 20, 2021, at UFC Fight Night 198. However, Grasso was forced to pull out from the event due to injury and she was replaced by Taila Santos.

Grasso was expected to face Viviane Araújo on January 22, 2022, at UFC 270. However, Araújo was forced to pull out from the event due to injury, and the bout was cancelled.

Grasso faced Joanne Wood in a rescheduled bout on March 26, 2022, at UFC on ESPN 33. She won the fight via a rear-naked choke in the first round.

Grasso was rescheduled to face Viviane Araújo on August 13, 2022, at UFC on ESPN 41. However, the bout was cancelled due to Grasso's visa issues. The pair was yet again rescheduled on October 15, 2022, at UFC Fight Night 212. Grasso won the fight via unanimous decision.

==== UFC Women's Flyweight Champion ====
Grasso faced Valentina Shevchenko on March 4, 2023, for the UFC Women's Flyweight Championship at UFC 285. Despite being a heavy underdog, she won the bout and earned the title via a face crank in the fourth round. This made her the first Mexican UFC women's champion. The win earned Grasso her first Performance of the Night bonus award.

Grasso made her first title defense in a rematch against Valentina Shevchenko on 16 September 2023, at UFC Fight Night 227. The match ended in a split draw.

On February 9, 2024, it was announced that Grasso and Shevchenko would be the coaches for The Ultimate Fighter 32 on ESPN+, which would feature contestants from the middleweight and featherweight divisions. Grasso faced Shevchenko for the third time on September 14, 2024, at UFC 306. Despite near submission attempts, she was dominated on the ground for nearly 15 minutes and lost the championship by unanimous decision.

==== Post-championship career ====
In her first non-title bout since 2022, Grasso made her return to action at UFC 315 in Montreal, Quebec, Canada on May 10, 2025, where she faced Natália Silva. She lost the fight by unanimous decision.

Grasso was scheduled to face former two-time UFC Women's Strawweight Champion Rose Namajunas on January 24, 2026, at UFC 324. However, Grasso pulled out on December 3 due to injury and was replaced by Natália Silva.

Grasso faced Maycee Barber in a rematch on March 28, 2026, at UFC Fight Night 271. She won the fight via knockout in the first round. This fight earned her a $100,000 Performance of the Night award. Grasso, who previously had suffered two consecutive defeats, was praised for her performance, with her knockout being called one of the greatest in the sport's history by UFC president Dana White.

Grasso faced Manon Fiorot in a title eliminator on September 12, 2026, at UFC Fight Night 288. She won the fight by unanimous decision.

== Personal life ==
Despite receiving offers to train in the United States, Grasso chose to remain at Lobo Gym and continue her training in her native Guadalajara to be close to friends and family.

In May 2023, Grasso was promoted to brown belt in Brazilian Jiu-Jitsu after winning the UFC women's flyweight title.

In addition to Spanish, Grasso speaks fluent Portuguese, a language she began learning in 2019 after watching Brazilian fighters in Las Vegas and becoming interested in the language with the help of her coach and former LUX champion, Diego Lopes. She also learned English, a language she began learning as a child.

== Championships and accomplishments ==
=== Mixed martial arts ===
- Ultimate Fighting Championship
  - UFC Women's Flyweight Championship (One time)
    - One successful title defense
    - First Mexican woman to win a UFC championship
  - Fight of the Night (One time) vs. Carla Esparza
  - Performance of the Night (Two times) vs. Valentina Shevchenko 1 and Maycee Barber 2
  - Tied (Taila Santos, Ariane da Silva, Natália Silva & Carli Judice) for most knockdowns landed in UFC Flyweight division history (3)
  - Fourth most total strikes landed in UFC Women's Flyweight division history (1220)
  - Third most significant strikes thrown in a 3-round fight (369) vs. Karolina Kowalkiewicz
  - UFC Honors Awards
    - 2023: President's Choice Performance of the Year Nominee vs. Valentina Shevchenko 1
  - UFC.com Awards
    - 2023: Submission of the Year, Upset of the Year & Ranked #9 Fight of the Year vs. Valentina Shevchenko 1, Ranked #5 Upset of the Year, Ranked #10 Fight of the Year vs. Valentina Shevchenko 2 & Ranked #2 Fighter of the Year
    - 2026: Half-Year Awards: Best Knockout of the 1HY vs. Maycee Barber
- Invicta Fighting Championships
  - Fight of the Night (one time) vs. Mizuki Inoue
  - Performance of the Night (one time) vs. Jodie Esquibel
- New York Post
  - 2023 Female Fighter of the Year
  - 2023 Upset of the Year vs. Valentina Shevchenko at UFC 285 (tied with Sean Strickland)
- Sherdog
  - 2023 Submission of the Year vs. Valentina Shevchenko
- The Sporting News
  - 2023 Submission of the Year vs. Valentina Shevchenko 1 at UFC 285
- MMA Junkie
  - 2015 February Fight of the Month vs. Mizuki Inoue
  - 2023 Female Fighter of the Year
  - 2023 Submission of the Year vs. Valentina Shevchenko at UFC 285
- MMA Fighting
  - 2023 Submission of the Year vs. Valentina Shevchenko
  - 2023 First Team MMA All-Star
- Cageside Press
  - 2023 Female Fighter of the Year
  - 2023 Submission of the Year vs. Valentina Shevchenko
- World MMA Awards
  - 2023 Female Fighter of the Year
  - 2023 Submission of the Year vs. Valentina Shevchenko at UFC 285
  - 2023 Upset of the Year vs. Valentina Shevchenko at UFC 285
- Wrestling Observer Newsletter
  - Women's MMA MVP (2023)
- ESPN
  - 2023 Female UFC Fighter of the Year
  - 2023 Submission of the Year vs.Valentina Shevchenko at UFC 285
- Fight Matrix
  - 2023 Female Fighter of the Year
- GiveMeSport
  - 2023 UFC Submission of the Year vs. Valentina Shevchenko at UFC 285
- LowKick MMA
  - 2023 Submission of the Year vs. Valentina Shevchenko at UFC 285
- Combat Press
  - 2023 Female Fighter of the Year
  - 2023 Upset of the Year vs. Valentina Shevchenko at UFC 285

== Mixed martial arts record ==
Professional record breakdown
24 matches	18 wins	5 losses
By knockout	5	0
By submission	2	1
By decision	11	4
Draws	1	

Res.	Record	Opponent	Method	Event	Date	Round	Time	Location	Notes
Win	18–5–1	Manon Fiorot	Decision (unanimous)	UFC Fight Night: Silva vs. Delgado	September 12, 2026	3	5:00	Glendale, Arizona, United States	UFC Women's Flyweight title eliminator.
Win	17–5–1	Maycee Barber	KO (punch)	UFC Fight Night: Adesanya vs. Pyfer	March 28, 2026	1	2:42	Seattle, Washington, United States	Performance of the Night.
Loss	16–5–1	Natália Silva	Decision (unanimous)	UFC 315	May 10, 2025	3	5:00	Montreal, Quebec, Canada	
Loss	16–4–1	Valentina Shevchenko	Decision (unanimous)	UFC 306	September 14, 2024	5	5:00	Las Vegas, Nevada, United States	Lost the UFC Women's Flyweight Championship.
Draw	16–3–1	Valentina Shevchenko	Draw (split)	UFC Fight Night: Grasso vs. Shevchenko 2	September 16, 2023	5	5:00	Las Vegas, Nevada, United States	Retained the UFC Women's Flyweight Championship.
Win	16–3	Valentina Shevchenko	Submission (face crank)	UFC 285	March 4, 2023	4	4:34	Las Vegas, Nevada, United States	Won the UFC Women's Flyweight Championship. Performance of the Night.
Win	15–3	Viviane Araújo	Decision (unanimous)	UFC Fight Night: Grasso vs. Araújo	October 15, 2022	5	5:00	Las Vegas, Nevada, United States	
Win	14–3	Joanne Wood	Submission (rear-naked choke)	UFC on ESPN: Blaydes vs. Daukaus	March 26, 2022	1	3:57	Columbus, Ohio, United States	
Win	13–3	Maycee Barber	Decision (unanimous)	UFC 258	February 13, 2021	3	5:00	Las Vegas, Nevada, United States	
Win	12–3	Kim Ji-yeon	Decision (unanimous)	UFC Fight Night: Smith vs. Rakić	August 29, 2020	3	5:00	Las Vegas, Nevada, United States	Flyweight debut.
Loss	11–3	Carla Esparza	Decision (majority)	UFC Fight Night: Rodríguez vs. Stephens	September 21, 2019	3	5:00	Mexico City, Mexico	Fight of the Night.
Win	11–2	Karolina Kowalkiewicz	Decision (unanimous)	UFC 238	June 8, 2019	3	5:00	Chicago, Illinois, United States	
Loss	10–2	Tatiana Suarez	Submission (rear-naked choke)	UFC Fight Night: Maia vs. Usman	May 19, 2018	1	2:44	Santiago, Chile	
Win	10–1	Randa Markos	Decision (split)	UFC Fight Night: Pettis vs. Moreno	August 5, 2017	3	5:00	Mexico City, Mexico	Catchweight (119 lb) bout; Grasso missed weight.
Loss	9–1	Felice Herrig	Decision (unanimous)	UFC Fight Night: Bermudez vs. The Korean Zombie	February 4, 2017	3	5:00	Houston, Texas, United States	
Win	9–0	Heather Jo Clark	Decision (unanimous)	The Ultimate Fighter Latin America 3 Finale: dos Anjos vs. Ferguson	November 5, 2016	3	5:00	Mexico City, Mexico	
Win	8–0	Jodie Esquibel	Decision (unanimous)	Invicta FC 18	July 29, 2016	3	5:00	Kansas City, Missouri, United States	Performance of the Night.
Win	7–0	Mizuki Inoue	Decision (unanimous)	Invicta FC 11	February 27, 2015	3	5:00	Los Angeles, California, United States	Fight of the Night.
Win	6–0	Alida Gray	TKO (punches)	Invicta FC 10	December 5, 2014	1	1:47	Houston, Texas, United States	
Win	5–0	Ashley Cummins	Decision (unanimous)	Invicta FC 8	September 6, 2014	3	5:00	Kansas City, Missouri, United States	
Win	4–0	Karina Rodríguez	Decision (unanimous)	Xtreme Kombat 20	August 31, 2013	3	3:00	Izcalli, Mexico	
Win	3–0	Alejandra Alvarez	TKO (punches and knees)	Xtreme Kombat 20	August 31, 2013	1	0:36	Izcalli, Mexico	
Win	2–0	Lupita Hernandez	KO (punch)	Fight Hard Championship 3	May 11, 2013	1	0:12	Jalisco, Mexico	
Win	1–0	Sandra del Rincon	KO (punch)	GEX: Old Jack's Fight Night	December 19, 2012	1	0:15	Jalisco, Mexico	Strawweight debut.

== See also ==
- List of current UFC fighters
- List of female mixed martial artists
- List of Mexican UFC fighters

Awards and achievements
Preceded by Valentina Shevchenko	3rd UFC Women's Flyweight Champion; March 4, 2023 – September 14, 2024	Succeeded by Valentina Shevchenko
Awards
Preceded by Valentina Shevchenko	World MMA Female Fighter of the Year; 2022–23	Succeeded by Zhang Weili
Preceded by Charles Oliveira	World MMA Submission of the Year; 2022–23 vs. Valentina Shevchenko at UFC 285	Succeeded by Diego Lopes
Preceded by Julianna Peña	World MMA Upset of the Year; 2022–23 vs. Valentina Shevchenko at UFC 285	Succeeded by Sean Strickland
