= Cláudia Gadelha =

Brazilian mixed martial artist

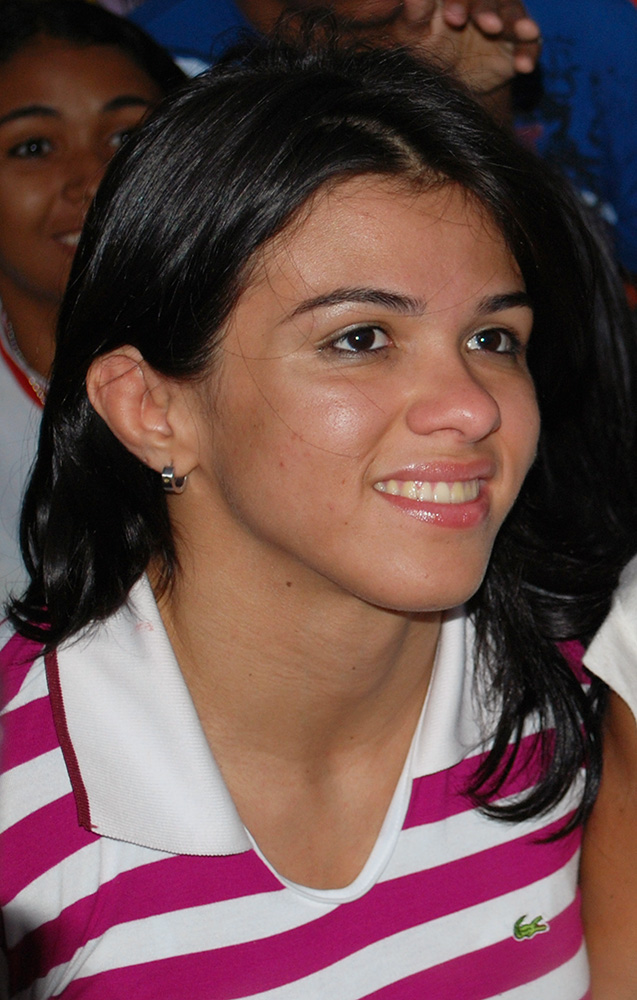
- Gadelha in October, 2009
- Born: Ana Cláudia Dantas Gadelha; December 7, 1988 (age 37); Mossoró, Rio Grande do Norte, Brazil
- Other names: Claudinha
- Height: 5 ft 3 in (1.60 m)
- Weight: 115 lb (52 kg; 8 st 3 lb)
- Division: Strawweight
- Style: Brazilian Jiu-Jitsu
- Team: Nova União (until 2016); Luttrell/Yee MMA (2017); UFC Performance Institute; Xtreme Couture Mixed Martial Arts (2017–present); Jackson Wink MMA Academy (2017); Nick Catone MMA (2019–present)
- Rank: 4th degree under André Pederneiras and Jair Lourenço
- Years active: 2008–2021 (MMA)

Mixed martial arts record
- Total: 23
- Wins: 18
- By knockout: 2
- By submission: 7
- By decision: 9
- Losses: 5
- By decision: 5

Other information
- Mixed martial arts record from Sherdog

Ana Cláudia Dantas Gadelha (Brazilian Portuguese pronunciation: [ˈklawdʒɐ ɡaˈdeʎɐ]; born December 7, 1988) is a Brazilian former professional mixed martial artist who competed in the Women's Strawweight division of the Ultimate Fighting Championship (UFC).

Since 2022, Gadelha has worked for the UFC on fighter development in her native Brazil. Gadelha was later made a Director of Business Development for the UFC and the UFC BJJ Senior Director of Jiu-Jitsu Strategy & Business Development.

== Background ==
Gadelha had a tough childhood and early youth. Her mother did not get along with her rebellious character, which, in her opinion, did not fit a girl. Gadelha's wish to practice martial arts was also not tolerated by her parents. Later she came into contact with drugs and bad friends, which forced her parents to take her to Natal to keep her away from these influences and finish high school. This relocation changed her life completely. At the age of 14, she started to work out secretly in a gym. One day Gadelha went to an MMA event in Natal where she saw a female fight. The experience raised her passion for the sport. At the same event, she met Jair Lourenço and he invited her to take a class at his academy. Shortly afterward, by sheer coincidence, her father rented an apartment in the Kimura headquarters, and with that, her relationship with Nova União was cemented. Henceforth she dedicated her life to martial arts and never got involved in drugs again. At age 18, Gadelha moved to Rio de Janeiro where she celebrated her successes in BJJ and debuted in MMA. "The sport was teaching me how I should deal with life. Today, I am a completely different person, thanks to martial arts," Gadelha has said.

Gadelha previously trained at Nova União with former UFC Featherweight Champion José Aldo. She is the youngest BJJ black belt in Nova União's history. Gadelha opened her own gym in March 2016. In August 2016, she decided to move to Stroudsburg, Pennsylvania, USA, and left Nova União. She also trained at Jackson-Wink MMA Academy.

In early 2018, Gadelha moved to Las Vegas, Nevada, where she trained at the UFC Performance Institute and Xtreme Couture.

== Mixed martial arts career ==
Gadelha made her professional MMA debut on June 5, 2008, at Force Fighting Championship 1 against Elaine Leite. She won via armbar in 17 seconds. Gadelha then won her next six fights to maintain an undefeated 7–0 record.

Gadelha was sidelined for all of 2011 due to complications with a vein in her leg. Upon her return, she took part in the filming of Fight Xchange, a documentary series that followed the lives of six mixed martial artists - three Canadians and three Brazilians - as they trained together and prepared for upcoming fights. The series aired on Super Channel in Canada. Brazilian Globo.com repeated the series in February/March 2014 on the channel Combate.

On April 20, 2012, at the conclusion of Fight Xchange, Gadelha made her North American MMA debut against Valérie Létourneau at Wreck MMA: Road to Glory. She won the fight by split decision.

In her next fight, Gadelha earned her first TKO win on September 21, 2012, when she defeated Adriana Vieira at Shooto Brazil 34.

In January 2014, Cláudia won the vote of the WMMA press for the 'Fan Favorite Fighter of the Year 2013.'

=== Invicta Fighting Championships ===
Gadelha was scheduled to make her Invicta FC debut at Invicta FC 4 against Carla Esparza for the inaugural Strawweight Championship, but a broken nose forced Gadelha out of the bout and she was replaced by Bec Hyatt.

After recovering from her injury, Gadelha faced and defeated Hérica Tibúrcio on May 11, 2013, at Max Sport 13.2 in Brazil.

Gadelha then made her Invicta FC debut at Invicta FC 6, replacing injured champion Carla Esparza against fellow undefeated fighter Ayaka Hamasaki. Despite having a point deducted in the first round for an illegal knee, Gadelha defeated Hamasaki via third-round TKO and earned a shot at Esparza's strawweight title.

On December 7, 2013, Gadelha was again set to challenge Esparza for the Invicta FC strawweight championship at Invicta FC 7. On late Friday evening before the event, Gadelha was taken to the hospital due to gastroenteritis, triggered by bacteria, thus canceling the fight.

=== Ultimate Fighting Championship ===
==== 2013 ====
On December 11, 2013, it was announced that Gadelha was signed by the UFC along with ten other strawweight fighters to compete on season 20 of The Ultimate Fighter which will crown the first ever UFC strawweight champion. In April 2014 it was announced that Cláudia Gadelha would not take part in TUF 20, but has signed a direct contract with the UFC.

==== 2014 ====
In the UFC's first female strawweight fight, Gadelha faced Tina Lähdemäki on July 16, 2014, at UFC Fight Night 45. Gadelha won the fight via unanimous decision (30–26, 30–27, and 30–27).

Gadelha next faced Joanna Jędrzejczyk on December 13, 2014, at UFC on Fox 13. She lost the fight via split decision. After the horn signaled the end of the third and final round, Gadelha punched Jędrzejczyk after the referee had separated the two fighters. Gadelha immediately apologetically approached Jędrzejczyk and claimed she didn't hear the bell, despite being separated by the referee. Dana White later stated in the UFC on Fox 13 post-fight press conference that the UFC wouldn't take any disciplinary actions towards Gadelha, due to her immediate regret shown towards Jędrzejczyk. The judges' decision caused controversies afterward as 12 out of 14 media outlets and the majority of viewers scored the bout in favor of Gadelha.

==== 2015 ====
Gadelha was expected to face Aisling Daly on April 11, 2015, at UFC Fight Night 64. However, Gadelha pulled out of the bout in late March citing a recent muscle spasm in her back. Subsequently, Daly was pulled from the card entirely.

Gadelha next faced former WSOF Women's Strawweight Champion Jessica Aguilar on August 1, 2015, at UFC 190. She won the fight by unanimous decision.

==== 2016 ====
In early 2016, the UFC announced that Gadelha would be one of the coaches, opposite former opponent Joanna Jędrzejczyk on The Ultimate Fighter 23. A rematch for the UFC Strawweight Championship between the two took place on July 8, 2016, at The Ultimate Fighter 23 Finale. She lost the fight via unanimous decision. This fight earned her a Fight of the Night award.

On November 19, 2016, she defeated Cortney Casey at UFC Fight Night 100 via unanimous decision.

==== 2017 ====
Gadelha faced Karolina Kowalkiewicz in the co-main event at UFC 212 on June 3, 2017. She won the bout by rear-naked choke submission in the first round. The win also earned Gadelha her first Performance of the Night bonus award.

Gadelha faced Jéssica Andrade at UFC Fight Night 117 on September 23, 2017. She lost the fight via unanimous decision. The fight earned Gadelha her second Fight of the Night bonus award.

==== 2018 ====
Gadelha faced Carla Esparza on June 9, 2018, at UFC 225. She won the fight by split decision.

Gadelha faced Nina Ansaroff on December 8, 2018, at UFC 231. She lost the fight via unanimous decision.

==== 2019 ====
Gadelha faced Randa Markos on July 6, 2019, at UFC 239. She won the fight via unanimous decision.

Gadelha was scheduled to face Cynthia Calvillo on December 7, 2019, at UFC on ESPN 7. However, on October 22, 2019, it was announced that Gadelha was forced to withdraw from the bout due to a torn ligament and a ruptured tendon in her ankle and was replaced by Marina Rodríguez.

==== 2020 ====
Gadelha was scheduled to face Alexa Grasso on January 18, 2020, at UFC 246. However, on the day of the weigh-ins, Grasso weighed in at 121.5, 5.5 pounds over the strawweight limit of 116 lbs. The NSAC decided to remove the fight because competitors are not allowed to compete if the weight between them is over 3 pounds.

Gadelha was expected to face Marina Rodriguez on May 2, 2020, at UFC Fight Night 174. However, on April 9, Dana White, the president of UFC announced that this event was postponed to a future date Instead Gadelha faced Angela Hill on May 16, 2020, at UFC on ESPN 8. She won the bout via split decision. 13 of 17 media outlets scored the fight in favor of Hill.

Gadelha was scheduled to face Yan Xiaonan on September 26, 2020, at UFC 253, but a knee injury sustained by Gadelha ruled her out of the bout. The pair was rescheduled to UFC on ESPN: Santos vs. Teixeira on November 7, 2020, instead. She lost the fight via unanimous decision.

On December 17, 2021, it was reported that Gadelha announced her retirement from competing in MMA professionally.

== Post-fighting career ==
Gadelha has worked for the UFC on fighter development in her native Brazil since her retirement. Gadelha was later made a Director of Business Development for the UFC and the UFC BJJ Senior Director of Jiu-Jitsu Strategy & Business Development.

== Championships and accomplishments ==
=== Mixed martial arts ===
- Ultimate Fighting Championship
  - Competed in and won the First Women's Strawweight fight in UFC History
  - Fight of the Night (Two times) vs. Joanna Jędrzejczyk 2 and Jéssica Andrade
  - Performance of the Night (One time) vs. Karolina Kowalkiewicz
  - Tied (Virna Jandiroba & Loopy Godínez) for second most takedowns landed in UFC Women's Strawweight division history (36)
  - UFC.com Awards
    - 2016: Ranked #6 Fight of the Year vs. Joanna Jędrzejczyk 2
- Women's MMA Awards
  - 2013 Fan Favorite Fighter of the Year
- MMA Junkie
  - 2016 July Fight of the Month vs. Joanna Jędrzejczyk
  - 2017 #5 Ranked Fight of the Year vs. Jéssica Andrade at UFC Fight Night: Saint Preux vs. Okami
  - 2017 September Fight of the Month vs. Jéssica Andrade
- CBS Sports
  - 2016 #7 Ranked UFC Fight of the Year vs. Joanna Jędrzejczyk

== Mixed martial arts record ==
Professional record breakdown
23 matches	18 wins	5 losses
By knockout	2	0
By submission	7	0
By decision	9	5

Res.	Record	Opponent	Method	Event	Date	Round	Time	Location	Notes
Loss	18–5	Yan Xiaonan	Decision (unanimous)	UFC on ESPN: Santos vs. Teixeira	November 7, 2020	3	5:00	Las Vegas, Nevada, United States	
Win	18–4	Angela Hill	Decision (split)	UFC on ESPN: Overeem vs. Harris	May 16, 2020	3	5:00	Jacksonville, Florida, United States	
Win	17–4	Randa Markos	Decision (unanimous)	UFC 239	July 6, 2019	3	5:00	Las Vegas, Nevada, United States	
Loss	16–4	Nina Ansaroff	Decision (unanimous)	UFC 231	December 8, 2018	3	5:00	Toronto, Ontario, Canada	
Win	16–3	Carla Esparza	Decision (split)	UFC 225	June 9, 2018	3	5:00	Chicago, Illinois, United States	
Loss	15–3	Jéssica Andrade	Decision (unanimous)	UFC Fight Night: Saint Preux vs. Okami	September 23, 2017	3	5:00	Saitama, Japan	Fight of the Night.
Win	15–2	Karolina Kowalkiewicz	Submission (rear-naked choke)	UFC 212	June 3, 2017	1	3:03	Rio de Janeiro, Brazil	Performance of the Night.
Win	14–2	Cortney Casey	Decision (unanimous)	UFC Fight Night: Bader vs. Nogueira 2	November 19, 2016	3	5:00	São Paulo, Brazil	
Loss	13–2	Joanna Jędrzejczyk	Decision (unanimous)	The Ultimate Fighter: Team Joanna vs. Team Cláudia Finale	July 8, 2016	5	5:00	Las Vegas, Nevada, United States	For the UFC Women's Strawweight Championship. Fight of the Night.
Win	13–1	Jessica Aguilar	Decision (unanimous)	UFC 190	August 1, 2015	3	5:00	Rio de Janeiro, Brazil	UFC Women's Strawweight title eliminator.
Loss	12–1	Joanna Jędrzejczyk	Decision (split)	UFC on Fox: dos Santos vs. Miocic	December 13, 2014	3	5:00	Phoenix, Arizona, United States	
Win	12–0	Tina Lähdemäki	Decision (unanimous)	UFC Fight Night: Cowboy vs. Miller	July 16, 2014	3	5:00	Atlantic City, New Jersey, United States	
Win	11–0	Ayaka Hamasaki	TKO (punches)	Invicta FC 6: Coenen vs. Cyborg	July 13, 2013	3	3:58	Kansas City, Missouri, United States	Invicta FC Strawweight title eliminator.
Win	10–0	Hérica Tibúrcio	Decision (unanimous)	Max Sport 13.2	May 11, 2013	3	5:00	São Paulo, Brazil	Catchweight (117 lb) bout.
Win	9–0	Adriana Vieira	TKO (punches)	Shooto Brazil 34	September 21, 2012	1	1:35	Brasília, Brazil	Flyweight bout.
Win	8–0	Valérie Létourneau	Decision (split)	Wreck MMA: Road to Glory	April 20, 2012	3	5:00	Gatineau, Quebec, Canada	Catchweight (130 lb) bout.
Win	7–0	Kalindra Faria	Submission (armbar)	Hard Fight Championship	September 25, 2010	1	1:10	Piracicaba, Brazil	
Win	6–0	Alessandra Silva	Submission (armbar)	Expo Fighting Championship: Day Two	August 22, 2010	1	N/A	Sorocaba, Brazil	
Win	5–0	Ariane Monteiro	Submission (rear-naked choke)	Itu Fight Championship	June 4, 2010	1	2:08	Itu, Brazil	
Win	4–0	Davina Maciel	Submission (armbar)	Vision Fight 1	December 20, 2009	1	1:26	Boa Vista, Brazil	
Win	3–0	Aline Nery	Decision (unanimous)	Shooto Brazil 14	November 28, 2009	3	5:00	Rio de Janeiro, Brazil	
Win	2–0	Juliana de Sousa	Submission (armbar)	Watch Out Combat Show 4	June 25, 2009	1	1:29	Rio de Janeiro, Brazil	
Win	1–0	Elaine Leite	Submission (armbar)	Force Fighting Championship 1	June 5, 2008	1	0:17	Aparecida, Brazil	

== See also ==
- List of female mixed martial artists
