= Bangtao Muay Thai & MMA =

Martial arts gym based in Thailand

- Est.: 2021; 5 years ago
- Founded by: George Hickman; Frank Hickman; Alex Schild; Andrew Wood
- Primary trainers: George Hickman (Head coach); Frank Hickman (Wrestling); Alex Schild (BJJ); Andrew Wood (S&C)
- Current titleholders: Alexander Volkanovski
- Past titleholders: Jiří Procházka; Zhang Weili
- Training facilities: Phuket, Thailand
- Website: www.bangtaomuaythai.com

Bangtao Muay Thai & MMA is a Muay Thai and mixed martial arts (MMA) gym based in Phuket, Thailand.

== Background ==
Bangtao Muay Thai & MMA was founded in 2021 by brothers George and Frank Hickman after they left their coaching positions at Tiger Muay Thai. Both of them competed in collegiate wrestling at Bloomsburg University before they eventually ended up in the MMA world. in 2020, when the COVID-19 pandemic occurred, Tiger Muay Thai had to temporarily shut down and the brothers started thinking about opening their own gym.

Other co-founding members of the gym are BJJ coach Alex Schild and strength and conditioning coach Andrew Wood who were also coaches at Tiger Muay Thai. All four were part of the team that coached UFC Featherweight Champion, Alexander Volkanovski.

The gym officially opened for April 2022 after some delay. Volkanovski and number one pound-for-pound kickboxer, Superbon Singha Mawynn conducted seminars during the grand opening.

Bangtao Muay Thai & MMA first received media attention when it was noted that Jiří Procházka was training at the gym in preparation for his fight against Glover Teixeira for the UFC Light Heavyweight Championship at UFC 275 in Singapore. In addition Zhang Weili at the same time was also trained at the gym for her fight against Joanna Jędrzejczyk at the same event. This fight would determine the next challenger against Carla Esparza for the UFC Women's Strawweight Championship. Both Procházka and Zhang would go on to win their fights at UFC 275.

Zhang Weili had also selected Bangtao Muay Thai & MMA to prepare for her title challenge bout against Carl Esparza at UFC 281.

The gym invites fighters to give seminars and demonstrations. Such fighters have included Tyson Fury, Georges St-Pierre, Anderson Silva and Jon Jones.

== Notable people ==
=== Mixed martial arts ===
==== UFC ====
- Alexander Volkanovski - Current UFC Featherweight Champion
- Jiří Procházka - Former UFC Light Heavyweight Champion
- Zhang Weili - Former UFC Women's Strawweight Champion
- Ian Machado Garry
- Tai Tuivasa
- Loma Lookboonmee
- John Castañeda

==== ONE Championship ====
- Shannon Wiratchai

=== Muay Thai ===
- Superbon Singha Mawynn
- Sam-A Gaiyanghadao
- Savvas Michael
- Lerdsila Chumpairtour
- Yodwicha Por.Boonsit

== See also ==
- List of professional MMA training camps
