= UFC 261 =

Mixed martial arts event in 2021

UFC 261: Usman vs. Masvidal 2
- The poster for UFC 261: Usman vs. Masvidal 2
- Promotion: Ultimate Fighting Championship
- Date: April 24, 2021
- Venue: VyStar Veterans Memorial Arena
- City: Jacksonville, Florida, United States
- Attendance: 15,269
- Total gate: $3,300,000
- Buyrate: 700,000

Event chronology
UFC on ESPN: Whittaker vs. Gastelum	UFC 261: Usman vs. Masvidal 2	UFC on ESPN: Reyes vs. Procházka

UFC 261: Usman vs. Masvidal 2 was a mixed martial arts event produced by the Ultimate Fighting Championship that took place on April 24, 2021 at VyStar Veterans Memorial Arena in Jacksonville, Florida, United States.

== Background ==
The promotion had initially planned to hold the event in Singapore. However, negotiations with the Singaporean government fizzled amongst COVID-19 protocols and the promotion initially turned to their home base of Las Vegas. On March 15, UFC president Dana White announced the event would be moved to Jacksonville, Florida, with a full capacity of "15,000 UFC fans", marking the first time since UFC 248 in March 2020 that a full capacity crowd would be available (the UFC hosted a trio of events in Abu Dhabi in January with a limited number of fans). Jacksonville also hosted the UFC's first fights back after the start of the COVID-19 pandemic in May 2020, before the organization started hosting events in either Las Vegas or Abu Dhabi.

A UFC Welterweight Championship rematch between the current champion Kamaru Usman (also The Ultimate Fighter: American Top Team vs. Blackzilians welterweight winner) and Jorge Masvidal headlined the event. They previously met at UFC 251, where Usman defended his title via unanimous decision.

A UFC Women's Strawweight Championship bout between the current champion Zhang Weili and former champion Rose Namajunas took place as the co-main event.

A UFC Women's Flyweight Championship bout between current champion Valentina Shevchenko and former strawweight champion Jéssica Andrade completed the triad of title fights.

A middleweight rematch between former UFC Middleweight Champion Chris Weidman and Uriah Hall was expected to take place at UFC 258 in February. They met previously in September 2010 at a Ring of Combat event for the organization's middleweight title, with Weidman winning via TKO. However, Weidman was pulled from that event in late-January due to a positive COVID-19 test. The pairing remained intact and eventually took place at this event.

Johnny Walker was expected to face Jimmy Crute in a light heavyweight bout. However, Walker pulled out due to an injury and was replaced by former UFC Light Heavyweight Championship challenger Anthony Smith.

Randy Brown and Alex Oliveira were expected to meet in a welterweight bout at UFC Fight Night: Rozenstruik vs. Gane, but Brown pulled out due to undisclosed reasons. They eventually fought each other at this event.

A bantamweight bout between Mark Striegl and Johnny Muñoz was expected to take place at the event. However, Striegl was removed from the bout on March 24 due to undisclosed reasons and replaced by Jamey Simmons. In turn, Simmons also pulled out on April 8 for undisclosed reasons. As a result, Muñoz was removed from the card as well and will be rescheduled for a future event.

== Results ==
Main card
Weight class				Method	Round	Time	Notes
Welterweight	Kamaru Usman (c)	def.	Jorge Masvidal	KO (punch)	2	1:02	(Note: For the UFC Welterweight Championship.)
Women’s Strawweight	Rose Namajunas	def.	Zhang Weili (c)	KO (head kick)	1	1:18	(Note: For the UFC Women's Strawweight Championship.)
Women’s Flyweight	Valentina Shevchenko (c)	def.	Jéssica Andrade	TKO (elbows)	2	3:19	(Note: For the UFC Women's Flyweight Championship.)
Middleweight	Uriah Hall	def.	Chris Weidman	TKO (leg injury)	1	0:17
Light Heavyweight	Anthony Smith	def.	Jimmy Crute	TKO (doctor stoppage)	1	5:00
Preliminary card (ESPN / ESPN+)
Welterweight	Randy Brown	def.	Alex Oliveira	Submission (rear-naked choke)	1	2:50
Welterweight	Dwight Grant	def.	Stefan Sekulić	Decision (split) (28–29, 29–28, 29–28)	3	5:00
Middleweight	Brendan Allen	def.	Karl Roberson	Submission (ankle lock)	1	4:55
Featherweight	Pat Sabatini	def.	Tristan Connelly	Decision (unanimous) (30–27, 29–28, 29–28)	3	5:00
Early preliminary card (ESPN2 / ESPN+)
Bantamweight	Danaa Batgerel	def.	Kevin Natividad	TKO (punches)	1	0:50
Lightweight	Kazula Vargas	def.	Rong Zhu	Decision (unanimous) (30–26, 29–28, 29–28)	3	5:00
Flyweight	Jeff Molina	def.	Aori Qileng	Decision (unanimous) (29–28, 29–28, 29–27)	3	5:00
Women’s Strawweight	Ariane Carnelossi	def.	Na Liang	TKO (punches)	2	1:28

== Bonus awards ==
The following fighters received $50,000 bonuses.

- Fight of the Night: Jeff Molina vs. Aori Qileng
- Performance of the Night: Kamaru Usman and Rose Namajunas

== See also ==
- List of UFC events
- List of current UFC fighters
- 2021 in UFC
