= Zhang Weili =

Chinese mixed martial artist (born 1990)

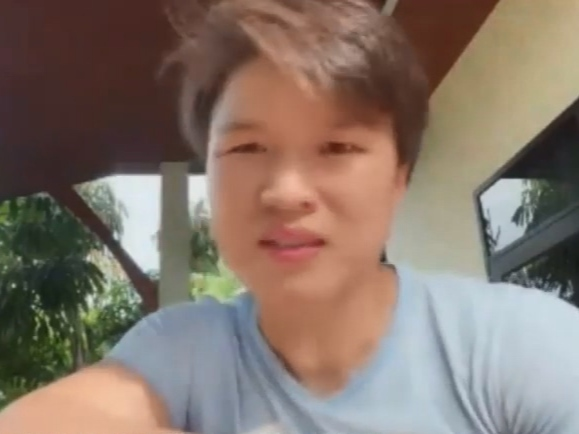
- Zhang in 2022
- Born: September 30, 1990 (age 36); Handan, Hebei, China
- Native name: 张伟丽
- Other names: Weili Zhang
- Nickname: Magnum
- Height: 5 ft 4 in (1.63 m)
- Weight: 125 lb (57 kg; 8.9 st)
- Division: Strawweight (2013–2025); Flyweight (2016, 2025)
- Reach: 63 in (160 cm)
- Fighting out of: Beijing, China
- Team: Black Tiger Fight Club; Fight Ready; Bangtao Muay Thai & MMA
- Trainer: Xuejun Cai (MMA); Pedro Jordão & Josh Hinger (Brazilian Jiu-Jitsu); Chong Xie (Hyperarch Fascia Training)
- Rank: Black belt in Brazilian Jiu-Jitsu under Pedro Jordão
- Years active: 2013–present

Mixed martial arts record
- Total: 30
- Wins: 26
- By knockout: 11
- By submission: 8
- By decision: 7
- Losses: 4
- By knockout: 1
- By decision: 3

Other information
- Mixed martial arts record from Sherdog

Zhang Weili (Chinese: 张伟丽; pinyin: Zhāng Wěilì; born September 30, 1990) is a Chinese professional mixed martial artist. She most recently competed in the women's Strawweight division of the Ultimate Fighting Championship (UFC), where she is the former two-time UFC Women's Strawweight Champion and the first Chinese fighter to win a UFC championship. A professional since 2013, Zhang formerly competed for Kunlun Fight (KLF), where she was the KLF Women's Strawweight Champion. As of November 7, 2026, she is #2 in the Meta UFC women's strawweight rankings, and as of October 17, 2026, she is #6 in the Meta UFC women's flyweight rankings and as of November 25, 2025, she is #3 in the UFC women's pound-for-pound rankings.

== Background ==
Zhang was born in Handan, Hebei, China. Her father is a retired miner and her mother is a homemaker. She has one older brother, who quit his job as a gold trader to support Zhang's career, and now works at the gym where she trains.

She started training in martial arts at a young age, beginning at 6 with Shaolin Kung Fu under the tutelage of a local master, after she was inspired by Kung Fu films. In primary school, she practiced many sports including athletics, football and table tennis. When she was 12, her parents sent her to a specialized martial arts school in Handan where she began training in Sanda and Shuai Jiao. After winning Sanda championships of the Hebei province multiple times, she was selected for the Jiangsu province Sanda team, however a recurring back injury sustained in training forced her to quit the sport early.

At the age of 17 she moved to Beijing, where she worked numerous part-time jobs including supermarket cashier, security guard and hotel desk clerk. In 2010 she found a job at a local Beijing gym as a fitness instructor, and was allowed to use their equipment for free after the gym closed in the evenings. During that time she would also start to learn Brazilian Jiu-Jitsu after watching others grapple there. She later switched to a front desk job, wherein she got to know fighters that trained at the gym, one of them being her idol, Wu Haotian, a pioneer of Chinese MMA. After they became acquainted in 2012, Haotian brought her to Black Tiger Fight Club. There she was noticed by coach Cai Xuejun, who would then decide to start training her in MMA.

In a Chinese television show in December 2019, she mentioned that Hong Kong Action Superstar Donnie Yen was her inspiration to compete in MMA, and that Donnie Yen's 2007 feature film Flashpoint was her first introduction to the sport of MMA. She also credited Ronda Rousey, and particularly her fight with Liz Carmouche in 2013, as giving her the motivation to quit her job and pursue MMA full-time.

Since Zhang began her career in the UFC, she has expressed her appreciation for Bruce Lee's philosophy and traditional Chinese martial arts several times. Before her fight with Yan Xiaonan at UFC 300, she said in an interview that she didn't want to limit herself to a single fighting style. Instead, her goal was to be like water — to change her form and tactics in response to her opponent's moves. She added that she had learned this from Tai Chi.

== Mixed martial arts career ==
=== Early career ===
Zhang made her professional MMA debut in 2013. After losing her professional debut to Meng Bo by unanimous decision, she would go on to win 11 straight fights before challenging Simone Duarte for the Kunlun Fight Female Strawweight Championship on May 25, 2017, at Kunlun Fight MMA 11. She won the fight via TKO in the second round.

Zhang made her first title defense against Aline Sattelmayer on June 1, 2017, at Kunlun Fight MMA 12. She won the fight by unanimous decision.

On July 22, 2017, Zhang attempted to win a second title, when she challenged Seo Ye-dam (서예담) for the vacant Top FC Strawweight Championship at TOP FC 15. She won the fight via TKO in the second round to capture the title.

In her next bout, Zhang made her second KLF title defense on August 28, 2017, at Kunlun Fight MMA 14 against Marilia Santos. She won the fight via TKO in the second round.

Zhang would fight one more time for KLF, amassing a record of 16–1 and improving her winning streak to 16 before signing with the UFC.

=== Ultimate Fighting Championship ===
Zhang made her promotion debut on August 4, 2018, at UFC 227 against Danielle Taylor. She won the fight via unanimous decision.

On November 24, 2018, Zhang faced Jessica Aguilar at UFC Fight Night: Blaydes vs. Ngannou 2. She won the fight via an armbar submission in the first round.

Zhang faced Tecia Torres on March 3, 2019, at UFC 235. She won the fight via unanimous decision.

==== UFC Strawweight Champion ====
Zhang faced Jéssica Andrade for the UFC Women's Strawweight Championship on August 31, 2019, at UFC Fight Night 157. She won the fight via first-round technical knockout to become the new strawweight champion, and the first UFC champion from China. The win also earned Zhang her first Performance of the Night bonus award.

In the first defense of her title, Zhang faced former strawweight champion Joanna Jędrzejczyk on March 7, 2020, at UFC 248. Zhang moved her training camp from China to Thailand and later moved to Dubai due to the COVID-19 pandemic, as TSA rules stated a two-week quarantine was imposed for any non-US citizen to be granted entry to the United States if they had recently been in China. After multiple failed attempts to obtain a US visa to fight in UFC's events in the US, on February 19, 2020, Zhang was granted US visa to fight at UFC 248. Zhang won the back–and–forth fight via split decision, which marked her first successful title defense. This win also marked her first Fight of the Night award. This bout was considered by many pundits as the greatest fight in women's MMA history.

In the second defense of her title, Zhang faced former strawweight champion Rose Namajunas on April 24, 2021, at UFC 261. She lost the fight by knockout early in the first round after getting caught with a head kick.

==== Post title reign and second title shot ====
A rematch between Zhang and Namajunas for the UFC Women's Strawweight Championship took place on November 6, 2021, at UFC 268. After a back and forth bout, Weili lost the fight via split decision. 14 out of 22 media scores gave it to Namajunas.

A rematch between Zhang and Joanna Jędrzejczyk took place on June 11, 2022, at UFC 275. For this fight Zhang trained at Bangtao Muay Thai & MMA gym in Thailand and worked with Josh Hinger. Zhang won the fight via knockout with a spinning backfist in the second round. This win earned her the Performance of the Night award and the Crypto.com "Fan Bonus of the Night" awards paid in bitcoin of US$10,000 for third place.

Zhang faced reigning champion Carla Esparza for the UFC Women's Strawweight Championship on November 12, 2022, at UFC 281. Zhang won the bout and regained the championship by the way of a rear-naked choke submission in the second round. This win earned her the Performance of the Night award. Zhang was promoted to brown belt in Brazilian jiu-jitsu following her win.

Zhang next defended her title against Amanda Lemos on August 19, 2023, at UFC 292. She defeated Lemos via unanimous decision after a dominant performance, with Zhang out striking Lemos 296–29, the largest differential for a women's fight in UFC history. The emphatic win also earned Zhang her fourth Performance of the Night award.

Zhang faced Yan Xiaonan on April 13, 2024, at UFC 300. This was the first all-China title fight. She won the bout by unanimous decision.

Zhang made her third title defense against The Ultimate Fighter: Team Joanna vs. Team Cláudia strawweight tournament winner Tatiana Suarez on February 9, 2025 at UFC 312. She won the fight by unanimous decision.

==== Move to Flyweight ====
Weili vacated her strawweight title on October 25, 2025 and challenged two-time UFC Women's Flyweight Champion Valentina Shevchenko for the title on November 15, 2025 at UFC 322. She lost the fight by unanimous decision.

During UFC 326's broadcast in March 2026, Weili's 2020 fight with Jędrzejczyk was announced as the next "fight wing" UFC Hall of Fame inductee during International Fight Week festivities in Las Vegas on July 9, 2026.

== Other ventures ==
In May 2020, it was announced that Zhang became a brand ambassador for cosmetics brand Estée Lauder in China, and was chosen as a face of their new makeup line Double Wear. In the same year, she appeared in a commercial for Audi. In 2021, she was named a global ambassador for recovery technology company Hyperice. She also had endorsement deals with clothing brands Under Armour and Hailan Home, e-commerce company JingDong and alcoholic beverage company Wusu Beer.

== Championships and accomplishments ==
=== Mixed martial arts ===
- Ultimate Fighting Championship
  - UFC Hall of Fame (Fight Wing, Class of 2026) vs. Joanna Jędrzejczyk 1 at UFC 248
  - UFC Women's Strawweight Championship (Two times, former)
    - Four successful title defenses (Overall)
      - One successful title defense (First reign)
      - Three successful title defenses (Second reign)
    - Tied (Joanna Jędrzejczyk) for most title fight wins in UFC Women's Strawweight division history (6)
    - Second most UFC Women's Strawweight title bouts (8) (behind Joanna Jędrzejczyk)
    - First Chinese champion in UFC history
    - First Asian champion in UFC history
  - Fight of the Night (One time) vs. Joanna Jędrzejczyk 1
  - Performance of the Night (Four times) vs. Jéssica Andrade, Joanna Jędrzejczyk 2, Carla Esparza & Amanda Lemos
    - Tied (Angela Hill) for fourth most Post-Fight bonuses in UFC Women's Strawweight division history (5)
  - Tied for second most wins in UFC Women's Strawweight division history (10)
  - Largest striking differential in a bout in UFC Women's history (288:21) (vs. Amanda Lemos)
  - Most significant ground strikes landed in a UFC Women's Strawweight bout (96) (vs. Amanda Lemos)
    - Most total ground strikes landed in a UFC Women's Strawweight bout (225) (vs. Amanda Lemos)
  - Most total strikes landed in a UFC Women's Strawweight bout (296) (vs. Amanda Lemos)
  - Fourth most control time in UFC Women's Strawweight division history (56:56)
  - Second most top position time in UFC Women's Strawweight division history (51:54)
  - Fourth most top position percentage in UFC Women's Strawweight division history (29.8%)
  - Tied (Angela Hill) for fourth most knockdowns in UFC Women's Strawweight division history (3)
  - Third highest significant strike accuracy in UFC Women's Strawweight division history (53.4%)
  - Second highest striking differential in UFC Women's Strawweight division history (2.38)
  - Fifth most takedowns landed in UFC Women's Strawweight division history (26)
    - Fourth most strikes landed in UFC Women's Strawweight division history (1552)
  - Fifth most strikes landed-per-minute in UFC Women's Strawweight division history (5.66)
  - UFC Honors Awards
    - 2019: President's Choice Performance of the Year Nominee vs. Jéssica Andrade
    - 2020: President's Choice Fight of the Year Winner vs. Joanna Jędrzejczyk 1
    - 2022: President's Choice Performance of the Year Winner vs. Joanna Jędrzejczyk 2, Fan's Choice Knockout of the Year Nominee vs. Joanna Jędrzejczyk 2 & Fan's Choice Submission of the Year Nominee vs. Carla Esparza
  - UFC.com Awards
    - 2018: Ranked #7 Newcomer of the Year
    - 2019: Top 10 Fighter of the Year
    - 2020: Fight of the Year vs. Joanna Jędrzejczyk 1
    - 2022: Ranked #4 Fighter of the Year, Half-Year Awards: Best Knockout of the 1HY & Ranked #4 Knockout of the Year vs. Joanna Jędrzejczyk 2
    - 2024: Ranked #9 Fight of the Year vs. Yan Xiaonan
- Kunlun Fight
  - KLF Female Strawweight Champion (One time)
    - Two successful title defenses
- Top Fighting Championship
  - Top FC Strawweight Champion (One time)
- MMA Junkie
  - 2020 March Fight of the Month vs. Joanna Jędrzejczyk at UFC 248
  - 2020 Female Fighter of the Year
  - 2020 Fight of the Year vs. Joanna Jędrzejczyk at UFC 248
  - June 2022 Knockout of the Month vs. Joanna Jędrzejczyk at UFC 248
  - November 2022 Submission of the Month vs. Carla Esparza at UFC 281
  - 2022 Female Fighter of the Year
  - 2022 Comeback Fighter of the Year
- World MMA Awards
  - 2019 – July 2020 Fight of the Year vs. Joanna Jędrzejczyk at UFC 248
  - 2024 Female Fighter of the Year
- Wrestling Observer Newsletter
  - 2020 MMA Match of the Year vs. Joanna Jędrzejczyk at UFC 248
  - Women's MMA MVP (2022, 2024)
- The Sporting News
  - 2022 Female Fighter of the Year
- MMA Fighting
  - 2020 Fight of the Year vs. Joanna Jędrzejczyk at UFC 248
  - 2022 First Team MMA All-Star
- The Athletic
  - 2020 Fight of the Year vs. Joanna Jędrzejczyk at UFC 248
- Bleacher Report
  - 2020 Fight of the Year vs. Joanna Jędrzejczyk at UFC 248
- Cageside Press
  - 2020 Fight of the Year vs. Joanna Jędrzejczyk at UFC 248
  - 2022 Female Fighter of the Year
- Sherdog
  - 2020 Fight of the Year vs. Joanna Jędrzejczyk at UFC 248
- BT Sport
  - 2020 Fight of the Year vs. Joanna Jędrzejczyk at UFC 248
  - 2022 Female Fighter of the Year
- MMA Weekly
  - 2020 Fight of the Year vs. Joanna Jędrzejczyk at UFC 248
- Combat Press
  - 2020 Fight of the Year vs. Joanna Jędrzejczyk at UFC 248
  - 2022 Female Fighter of the Year
- ESPN
  - 2019 Female Fighter of the Year
  - 2020 Fight of the Year vs. Joanna Jędrzejczyk at UFC 248
  - 2022 Female Fighter of the Year
- Yahoo! Sports
  - 2019 Female Fighter of the Year
  - 2020 Fight of the Year vs. Joanna Jędrzejczyk at UFC 248
  - 2022 Female Fighter of the Year
- Bloody Elbow
  - 2019 Upset of the Year vs. Jéssica Andrade at UFC Fight Night: Andrade vs. Zhang
  - 2020 Fight of the Year vs. Joanna Jędrzejczyk at UFC 248
- CBS Sports
  - 2020 UFC Fight of the Year vs. Joanna Jędrzejczyk at UFC 248
- MMA Sucka
  - 2020 Fight of the Year vs. Joanna Jędrzejczyk at UFC 248
- Slacky Awards
  - 2023 Gameplan of the Year vs. Amanda Lemos at UFC 292

== Mixed martial arts record ==
Professional record breakdown
30 matches	26 wins	4 losses
By knockout	11	1
By submission	8	0
By decision	7	3

Res.	Record	Opponent	Method	Event	Date	Round	Time	Location	Notes
Loss	26–4	Valentina Shevchenko	Decision (unanimous)	UFC 322	November 15, 2025	5	5:00	New York City, New York, United States	Return to Flyweight. For the UFC Women's Flyweight Championship.
Win	26–3	Tatiana Suarez	Decision (unanimous)	UFC 312	February 9, 2025	5	5:00	Sydney, Australia	Defended the UFC Women's Strawweight Championship. Later vacated the title on October 25, 2025.
Win	25–3	Yan Xiaonan	Decision (unanimous)	UFC 300	April 13, 2024	5	5:00	Las Vegas, Nevada, United States	Defended the UFC Women's Strawweight Championship.
Win	24–3	Amanda Lemos	Decision (unanimous)	UFC 292	August 19, 2023	5	5:00	Boston, Massachusetts, United States	Defended the UFC Women's Strawweight Championship. Performance of the Night.
Win	23–3	Carla Esparza	Submission (rear-naked choke)	UFC 281	November 12, 2022	2	1:05	New York City, New York, United States	Won the UFC Women's Strawweight Championship. Performance of the Night.
Win	22–3	Joanna Jędrzejczyk	KO (spinning backfist)	UFC 275	June 12, 2022	2	2:28	Kallang, Singapore	Performance of the Night.
Loss	21–3	Rose Namajunas	Decision (split)	UFC 268	November 6, 2021	5	5:00	New York City, New York, United States	For the UFC Women's Strawweight Championship.
Loss	21–2	Rose Namajunas	KO (head kick)	UFC 261	April 24, 2021	1	1:18	Jacksonville, Florida, United States	Lost the UFC Women's Strawweight Championship.
Win	21–1	Joanna Jędrzejczyk	Decision (split)	UFC 248	March 7, 2020	5	5:00	Las Vegas, Nevada, United States	Defended the UFC Women's Strawweight Championship. Fight of the Night.
Win	20–1	Jéssica Andrade	TKO (knees and punches)	UFC Fight Night: Andrade vs. Zhang	August 31, 2019	1	0:42	Shenzhen, China	Won the UFC Women's Strawweight Championship. Performance of the Night.
Win	19–1	Tecia Torres	Decision (unanimous)	UFC 235	March 2, 2019	3	5:00	Las Vegas, Nevada, United States	
Win	18–1	Jessica Aguilar	Submission (armbar)	UFC Fight Night: Blaydes vs. Ngannou 2	November 24, 2018	1	3:41	Beijing, China	
Win	17–1	Danielle Taylor	Decision (unanimous)	UFC 227	August 4, 2018	3	5:00	Los Angeles, California, United States	
Win	16–1	Bianca Sattelmayer	Submission (armbar)	Kunlun Fight MMA 15	October 3, 2017	1	3:29	Seoul, South Korea	Catchweight (119 lb) bout.
Win	15–1	Marilia Santos	TKO (elbows)	Kunlun Fight MMA 14	August 28, 2017	2	3:20	Yantai, China	Defended the Kunlun Fight Strawweight Championship.
Win	14–1	Seo Ye-dam	TKO (elbow and punches)	Top FC 15	July 22, 2017	2	1:35	Seoul, South Korea	Won the vacant Top FC Strawweight Championship.
Win	13–1	Aline Sattelmayer	Decision (unanimous)	Kunlun Fight MMA 12	June 1, 2017	3	5:00	Yantai, China	Defended the Kunlun Fight Strawweight Championship.
Win	12–1	Simone Duarte	TKO (punches)	Kunlun Fight MMA 11	May 25, 2017	1	2:29	Jining, China	Won the Kunlun Fight Strawweight Championship.
Win	11–1	Nayara Hemily	Submission (guillotine choke)	Kunlun Fight MMA 9	February 25, 2017	1	0:41	Sanya, China	
Win	10–1	Veronica Grenno	TKO (knees to the body)	Kunlun Fight MMA 8	January 2, 2017	1	1:50	Sanya, China	
Win	9–1	Karla Benitez	KO (punch)	Kunlun Fight MMA 7	December 15, 2016	1	2:15	Beijing, China	Defended the Kunlun Fight Strawweight Championship.
Win	8–1	Maíra Mazar	Submission (rear-naked choke)	Kunlun Fight 53	September 24, 2016	1	4:11	Beijing, China	Won the vacant Kunlun Fight Strawweight Championship.
Win	7–1	Emi Fujino	TKO (doctor stoppage)	Kunlun Fight 49	August 7, 2016	2	2:51	Tokyo, Japan	Return to Strawweight.
Win	6–1	Liliya Kazak	KO (head kick)	Kunlun Fight 47	July 10, 2016	2	4:13	Nanjing, China	
Win	5–1	Alice Ardelean	Submission (rear-naked choke)	Kunlun Fight MMA 5	May 22, 2016	2	4:41	Seoul, South Korea	Flyweight debut.
Win	4–1	Svetlana Gotsyk	TKO (punches)	Kunlun Fight 38	February 21, 2016	2	2:29	Pattaya, Thailand	
Win	3–1	Samantha Jean-Francois	TKO (punches)	Kunlun Fight 35	December 19, 2015	1	3:37	Luoyang, China	
Win	2–1	Mei Huang	Submission (rear-naked choke)	CKF 10/27	October 27, 2014	1	0:40	Qian'an, China	Catchweight (132 lb) bout.
Win	1–1	Shuxia Wu	Submission (armbar)	CKF 10/14	October 14, 2014	1	1:56	Qian'an, China	Catchweight (132 lb) bout.
Loss	0–1	Meng Bo	Decision (unanimous)	China MMA League	November 9, 2013	2	5:00	Xuchang, China	Strawweight debut.

== Kickboxing record ==
Kickboxing record
2 Wins (0 KOs), 2 Losses, 0 Draws
Date	Result	Opponent	Event	Location	Method	Round	Time
2017-12-17	Loss	(China) Guan Acui	Kunlun Fight 68	Zunyi, China	Decision	3	3:00
KLF Female 52.5 kg Tournament Final.
2017-12-17	Win	(China) Chang Ningning	Kunlun Fight 68	Zunyi, China	Decision	3	3:00
KLF Female 52.5 kg Tournament Semi-Finals.
2017-12-17	Win	(Australia) Alma Juniku	Kunlun Fight 68	Zunyi, China	Decision	3	3:00
KLF Female 52.5 kg Tournament Quafter-Finals.
2013-12-14	Loss	(Japan) Satoko Sasaki	Krush 35	Tokyo, Japan	Decision (Unanimous)	3	3:00
Legend: Win Loss Draw/No contest Notes

== See also ==
- List of current UFC fighters
- List of female mixed martial artists

Achievements
Preceded by Jéssica Andrade	5th UFC Women's Strawweight Champion; August 31, 2019 – April 24, 2021	Succeeded by Rose Namajunas
Preceded by Carla Esparza	8th UFC Women's Strawweight Champion; November 12, 2022 – October 25, 2025	Vacant Title next held by Mackenzie Dern
Awards
Preceded by Tony Ferguson vs. Anthony Pettis	World MMA Fight of the Year; 2019–20 vs. Joanna Jędrzejczyk at UFC 248	Succeeded by Deiveson Figueiredo vs. Brandon Moreno
Preceded by Alexa Grasso	World MMA Female Fighter of the Year; 2023–24	Incumbent
