= Rose Namajunas =

American professional mixed martial artist (born 1992)

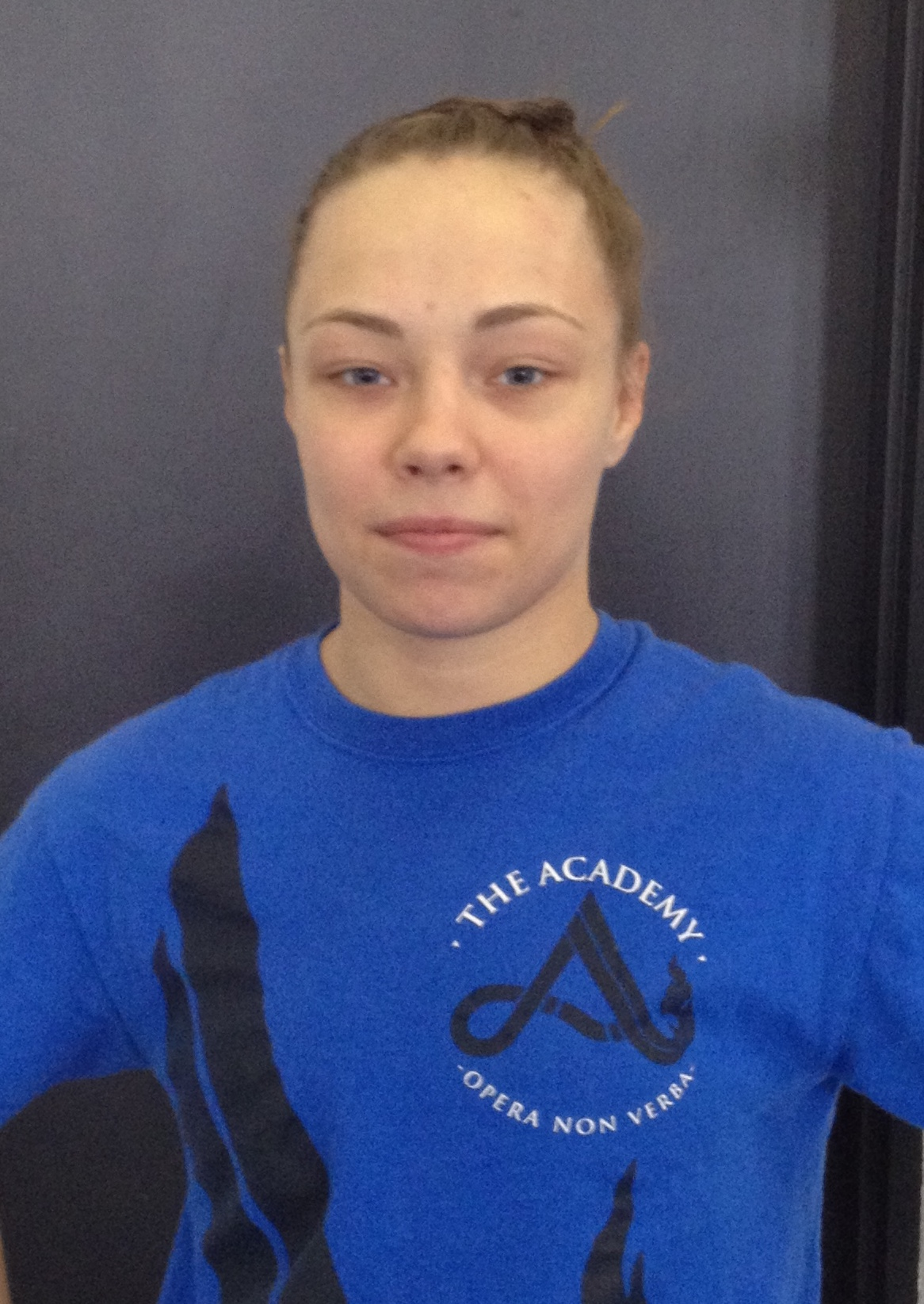
- Namajunas in 2012
- Born: Rose Gertrude Namajunas; June 29, 1992 (age 34); Milwaukee, Wisconsin, U.S.
- Other names: Thug
- Height: 5 ft 5 in (165 cm)
- Weight: 125 lb (57 kg; 8 st 13 lb)
- Division: Strawweight (2013–2022); Flyweight (2023–present)
- Reach: 65 in (165 cm)
- Fighting out of: Denver, Colorado, U.S.
- Team: 303 Training Center (2016–2020); Grudge Training Center (2012–2016); Minnesota Martial Arts Academy (2011–2012); Roufusport
- Trainer: Trevor Wittman; Pat Barry; Greg Nelson
- Rank: Black belt in Taekwondo; Black belt in Karate; Brown belt in Brazilian Jiu-Jitsu under Tony Basile
- Years active: 2013–present

Mixed martial arts record
- Total: 22
- Wins: 14
- By knockout: 2
- By submission: 5
- By decision: 7
- Losses: 8
- By knockout: 1
- By submission: 1
- By decision: 6

Other information
- Mixed martial arts record from Sherdog

Rose Gertrude Namajunas (born June 29, 1992) is an American professional mixed martial artist. She currently competes in the women's Flyweight division of the Ultimate Fighting Championship (UFC), and is a former two-time UFC Women's Strawweight Champion. As of October 3, 2026, she is #7 in the Meta UFC women's flyweight rankings, and as of November 17, 2026, she is #14 in the UFC women's pound-for-pound rankings.

== Early life and education ==
Rose Gertrude Namajunas was born in Milwaukee, Wisconsin on June 29, 1992, to Lithuanian parents who had moved to the United States in September 1991. She was named Rose (Lithuanian: Rožė) after her great-grandmother Rožė Gotšalkaitė Namajūnienė, whose husband Juozas was an Independent Lithuania military officer. Juozas fought in the resistance during the Soviet invasion of Lithuania before being forced to enlist in the Red Army. Following the German declaration of war on the Soviet Union and the subsequent Soviet retreat from the Baltic states, Juozas left the Red Army, but was arrested by the NKVD after Lithuania was reoccupied and sent to a prison camp. He was killed by Soviet KGB agents in 1968. Namajunas's grandfather Algimantas Andriukonis was a successful wrestler, and won national championships in Lithuania and competitions in the USSR. Namajunas regularly visits Lithuania and communicates in the Lithuanian language with her grandparents.

Namajunas's father Arturas, who suffered from schizophrenia, left the family when she was still young and died of pneumonia in Germany in 2008, when Rose was 16. Her mother was a pianist, trained at the Lithuanian Academy of Music and Theatre. Namajunas grew up in Milwaukee in a tough, predominantly African-American neighborhood, where she was a witness to violence from a young age. Her mother worked a lot and her brother was only rarely home. Her neighborhood friends nicknamed her "Thug Rose", due to the fact that she was the only white girl among them and was the smallest, yet acted tougher than any of them. Namajunas has mentioned being a victim of child sexual abuse, while emphasizing that she does not want to speak about specific details. She graduated from Milwaukee High School of the Arts, where she was an accomplished cross-country runner.

=== Martial arts training ===
Namajunas started practicing taekwondo at the age of 5. She earned her poom belt (junior black belt) at age 9. After that, she went on to practice both karate and BJJ. While in high school, she started training in kickboxing and mixed martial arts with Duke Roufus at Roufusport, and she was also a senior-year wrestler at Milwaukee High School of the Arts.

=== Professional grappling career ===
Namajunas was scheduled to compete in a grappling match against Danielle Kelly on December 30, 2021, at Fury Pro Grappling 3 but was forced to withdraw from the event at the last minute due to a positive Covid-19 test and was replaced by Carla Esparza. Namajunas returned to the promotion for the main event of Fury Pro Grappling 6 on December 30, 2022, where she faced fellow UFC veteran Gillian Robertson. Namajunas lost the bout by rear-naked choke in 65 seconds.

Namajunas also signed up to compete in the women's under 60 kg (130 lb) and absolute division at the ADCC Denver Open on May 13, 2023. She won a bronze medal in the absolute division.

== Mixed martial arts career ==
=== Early career ===
Namajunas began competing in MMA as an amateur in 2010. She trained under Greg Nelson at Minnesota Martial Arts Academy. She obtained a perfect amateur record of 4–0 with 2 wins by TKO and 2 by decision, with both finishes coming in the first round.

=== Invicta Fighting Championship ===
She made her professional debut against Emily Kagan at Invicta FC 4: Esparza vs. Hyatt on January 5, 2013. After two back-and-forth rounds, Namajunas was able to secure the victory via submission due to a rear-naked choke in round three. The victory in her pro debut also earned her the Submission of the Night bonus.

In her second professional appearance, Namajunas faced Kathina Catron at Invicta FC 5: Penne vs. Waterson on April 5, 2013. She won the fight by submission due to a flying armbar just 12 seconds into the first round. This performance garnered Namajunas her second Invicta Submission of the Night award.

Namajunas fought fellow undefeated prospect Tecia Torres at Invicta FC 6: Coenen vs. Cyborg on July 13, 2013. Namajunas lost the fight by unanimous decision.

=== The Ultimate Fighter ===
On December 11, 2013, it was announced that Namajunas was signed by the Ultimate Fighting Championship (UFC) along with 10 other strawweight fighters to compete on season 20 of The Ultimate Fighter, which would crown the first-ever UFC strawweight champion.

Namajunas was the fourth pick by coach Gilbert Melendez. She defeated Alex Chambers by submission due to a rear-naked choke in the preliminary round of the tournament.

In the quarter-finals, Namajunas faced Joanne Calderwood. She won the fight via kimura in the second round.

In the semi-finals, Namajunas faced Randa Markos. She again won the fight via kimura in the first round.

In the final of the tournament, she fought Carla Esparza on December 12, 2014 at The Ultimate Fighter: A Champion Will Be Crowned Finale for the inaugural UFC Women's Strawweight Championship. She lost the bout via rear-naked choke in the third round.

=== Ultimate Fighting Championship ===
Despite losing in The Ultimate Fighter finale, Namajunas was awarded two season $25,000 bonus awards for Performance of the Season and Fight of the Season for her bout with Joanne Calderwood.

Namajunas was expected to face Nina Ansaroff on May 23, 2015, in a preliminary bout at UFC 187. Prior to the fight, Ansaroff missed weight by 4 pounds and was fined 20 percent of her fight purse. The bout was scrapped entirely a couple of hours before the event, as Ansaroff was declared medically unfit to compete due to illness. According to Ansaroff's camp, she contracted the flu the week before, and the weight cut exacerbated the illness, forcing Ansaroff to abandon her weight cut early, and ultimately withdraw from the fight. Though the fight could not take place, Namajunas was paid her full fight purse (show- and win money).

Namajunas fought Angela Hill on October 3, 2015, at UFC 192. After some back-and-forth striking exchanges on the feet, Namajunas took Hill down with a trip off a punch. As Hill stood up, Namajunas quickly secured a rear-naked choke, submitting Hill in the first round.

In a quick turnaround, Namajunas faced streaking prospect Paige VanZant in the main event of UFC Fight Night 80 on December 10, 2015, replacing an injured Joanne Calderwood. Namajunas won the fight midway through the fifth round via submission due to a rear naked choke. The win also earned Namajunas her first Performance of the Night bonus award.

On April 16, 2016, Namajunas faced the undefeated Tecia Torres at UFC on Fox 19 in a rematch of their 2013 fight at Invicta FC 6. Namajunas won the fight via unanimous decision.

On July 30, 2016, Namajunas fought Karolina Kowalkiewicz at UFC 201 in a match regarded as a title eliminator. Kowalkiewicz defeated Namajunas via split decision. Both participants were awarded Fight of the Night for their performance.

Namajunas faced Michelle Waterson on April 15, 2017, at UFC on Fox 24. Namajunas won by submission due to a rear-naked choke in round 2, marking the 5th submission finish in her career.

==== Strawweight champion ====
Namajunas faced Strawweight champion Joanna Jędrzejczyk at UFC 217 at Madison Square Garden in New York on November 4, 2017. She came in as a big underdog against the undefeated champion. Namajunas, in what was regarded as a huge upset, won by KO in first round to be crowned the new UFC Women's Strawweight Champion. The win also earned Namajunas her second Performance of the Night bonus award. This was Namajunas's first knockout victory in her professional career (2 TKO-wins as an amateur). At the UFC 217 post-fight press conference, Namajunas stated that she intended to use her champion status as a platform to spread awareness of mental illness.

In the first defense of her title, Namajunas faced Jędrzejczyk in a rematch that took place on April 7, 2018, at UFC 223. She won the fight by unanimous decision. Namajunas spent the remainder of the year recovering from a lingering case of spinal stenosis from a C6 vertebral compression fracture, symptoms of which manifested while training with Valentina and Antonina Shevchenko in 2017, and had intensified during training camp for UFC 223.

In her second title defense, Namajunas faced Jéssica Andrade in the main event at UFC 237 on May 11, 2019, in Andrade's home country of Brazil, in what would be Namajunas's first MMA fight outside the United States. Namajunas lost the fight by knockout via a slam in the second round. The fight earned her the Fight of the Night award.

==== Post-reign ====
Namajunas was scheduled to face Jéssica Andrade for a rematch on April 18, 2020 at UFC 249. On April 8, 2020, Namajunas withdrew from the event, with her manager citing a pair of deaths in the family related to the COVID-19 pandemic as the reason. Instead the bout was rescheduled and eventually took place on July 12, 2020 at UFC 251. Namajunas won the fight via split decision. This fight earned her the Fight of the Night award.

==== Second reign as strawweight champion ====
Namajunas faced Zhang Weili for the UFC Women's Strawweight Championship on April 24, 2021 at UFC 261. She won the fight by knockout early in the first round after landing a head kick, claiming the UFC Women's Strawweight World Championship for the second time. Namajunas became the first female fighter to regain a UFC Championship belt. The win earned Namajunas a Performance of the Night bonus award.

The rematch between Namajunas and Zhang for the UFC Women's Strawweight Championship took place on November 6, 2021 at UFC 268. After a back and forth bout, Namajunas defended her title, winning the bout via split decision. 14 out of 22 media scores gave it to Namajunas.

Namajunas faced Carla Esparza in a rematch for the UFC Women's Strawweight Championship on May 7, 2022 at UFC 274. Namajunas lost the fight and title via split decision in a bout that was heavily criticized for both fighter's low output. Despite the uneventful nature of the fight, Namajunas was given the first place Crypto.com "Fan Bonus of the Night" award.

==== Move to flyweight ====
Namajunas faced Manon Fiorot on September 2, 2023 at UFC Fight Night 226. She lost the fight via unanimous decision.

Namajunas faced Amanda Ribas on March 23, 2024 in the main event, at UFC on ESPN 53. She won the bout by unanimous decision.

Namajunas was scheduled to face Maycee Barber on July 13, 2024, at UFC on ESPN 59. However, Barber withdrew from the bout, due to what was later revealed to be ongoing health problems, and was replaced by Tracy Cortez. Namajunas defeated Cortez by unanimous decision.

Namajunas faced Erin Blanchfield in the main event on November 2, 2024 at UFC Fight Night 246. The bout was later shifted to the co-main event but remained five rounds. She lost the fight by unanimous decision.

Namajunas faced Miranda Maverick on June 14, 2025 at UFC on ESPN 69. She won the fight by unanimous decision.

Namajunas was scheduled to face former UFC Women's Flyweight Champion Alexa Grasso on January 24, 2026 at UFC 324. However, Grasso pulled out on December 3 due to injury and was replaced by Natália Silva. She lost the fight via unanimous decision. 13 out of 18 media outlets scored the bout for Namajunas.

== Fighting style ==
Namajunas utilizes forward movement while pressuring opponents with jabs and high kicks. She is known for her advanced technical striking and footwork, using a variety of angles and several creative adjustments. During her fight at Invicta FC 6, she directed a series of axe kicks, front kicks, and forward roundhouse kicks to her opponent's head. After closing the distance, she will sometimes attempt to grapple and execute a submission.

== Personal life ==
Namajunas professes Christianity, as well as anti-communist views. Prior to her first bout against Chinese fighter Zhang Weili, Namajunas spoke of the history of communist oppression in her ancestral homeland Lithuania and mentioned the documentary The Other Dream Team as an inspiration. She said the documentary gives a "good idea as to what my family had to go through, the reason I'm in the United States today, the reason that I do mixed martial arts, all of that stuff". She said that she viewed her fight with Zhang as symbolizing a fight between communism and freedom, saying that "Weili is red" and "represents [communism]", relating it to her family's history under the former USSR regime in Lithuania, and stating that it is "better dead than red". In a further interview, Namajunas stated that her comments were not directed personally at Zhang, and said it was more about her own "internal battles" as well as some "generational PTSD". Zhang later said she ignored Namajunas's comments, stating "I believe as an athlete you have to focus on yourself." In describing her background and motivation for fighting, Namajunas stated, "I've got the Christ consciousness, I've got Lithuanian blood and I've got the American dream."

A documentary of Namajunas' life, Thug Rose: Mixed Martial Artist, was released in 2022, premiering at the Austin Film Festival.

=== Family ===
Namajunas is the fiancée and training partner of former Glory and UFC heavyweight Pat Barry. Namajunas and Barry met at Duke Roufus' gym, where Barry started training after losing his home to Hurricane Katrina in 2005, while Namajunas started training there during high school. Barry says he fell in love with Namajunas the first time he saw her. In a December 2014 interview, Barry said that he and Namajunas had been dating "for almost five years now", while Namajunas felt like it was "two or three years". The couple got engaged in 2014.

Namajunas has a brother named Nojus, who once operated a private piano studio. Namajunas herself has played the piano since the age of five. Nojus also is a mixed martial artist, and made his professional debut in March 2021.

== Championships and accomplishments ==
- Lithuanian American National Hall of Fame - Class of 2019
- ESPY Award nominee (2018 for Best Fighter and 2021 for Best MMA Fighter)
- Kids' Choice Sports 2018 Award for Biggest Powerhouse (nominee)
- Eighth Annual Real Women Awards - 2017 Woman of the Year

=== Mixed martial arts ===
- Ultimate Fighting Championship
  - UFC Women's Strawweight Championship (Two times; Former)
    - Two successful title defenses (overall)
      - One successful title defense (first reign)
      - One successful title defense (second reign)
    - Third most title fight wins in UFC Women's Strawweight division history (4)
  - Performance of the Night (Three times) vs. Paige VanZant, Joanna Jędrzejczyk 1, and Zhang Weili
  - Fight of the Night (Three times) vs. Karolina Kowalkiewicz and Jéssica Andrade (x2)
    - Third most Post-Fight bonuses in UFC Women's Strawweight division history (6)
  - Tied (Amanda Lemos, Mackenzie Dern & Tatiana Suarez) for second most finishes in UFC Women's Strawweight division history (5)
  - First woman in UFC history to regain a championship title after losing it
  - Holds victories over three former UFC Women's Strawweight Champions - Joanna Jędrzejczyk, Jéssica Andrade, and Zhang Weili
  - Latest finish in a UFC Women's Strawweight division bout (2:25 at R5)
  - The Ultimate Fighter 20 (Runner-Up)
    - TUF 20 Fight of the Season vs. Joanne Calderwood
    - TUF 20 Performance of the Season vs. Joanne Calderwood
  - UFC Honors Awards
    - 2021: President's Choice Performance of the Year Nominee vs. Zhang Weili 1 & Fan's Choice Knockout of the Year Nominee vs. Zhang Weili 1
  - UFC.com Awards
    - 2017: Upset of the Year vs. Joanna Jędrzejczyk 1 & Ranked #2 Fighter of the Year
    - 2020: Ranked #7 Fight of the Year vs. Jéssica Andrade 2
    - 2021: Ranked #4 Fighter of the Year & #4 Knockout of the Year vs. Zhang Weili 1
- Invicta FC
  - Submission of the Night (Two times) vs. Emily Kagan, Kathina Catron
- Crypto.com
  - Fan Bonus of the Night vs. Carla Esparza
- Slacky Awards
  - 2015 Technical Turn-Around of the Year
  - 2017 Gameplan of the Year vs. Joanna Jędrzejczyk at UFC 217
- Fighter of the Year
  - 2017 MMA Fighter of the Year
    - ESPN, MMASucka, MMA Fighting (Top 5: #4), MMA Mania (Top 5: #4), RealSport (Top 5: #3) MMADNA
  - 2017 UFC Fighter of the Year
    - CBS Sports (Top 5: #3)
  - 2017 MMA Female Fighter of the Year
    - World MMA Awards, Yahoo Sports, MMAjunkie, Cageside Press, Combat Press, SevereMMA, MMA Today (Top 50: #1), Awakening Fighters, Promoting Real Women
  - 2021 MMA Female Fighter of the Year
    - World MMA Awards (July 1, 2020 – June 30, 2021), Cageside Press, Combat Press, MMA Sucka
  - 2021 Women's MMA MVP/UFC Fighter of the Year
    - Wrestling Observer Newsletter, CBS Sports (Top 3: #3)
- Upset of the Year
  - 2017 MMA Upset of the Year vs. Joanna Jędrzejczyk
    - World MMA Awards, Sports Illustrated, Sherdog, MMA Junkie, MMA Fighting, MMA Weekly, Metro.co.uk, Combat Press, Fight Booth, MMA Sucka, The MMA Takeover, SevereMMA, Bloody Elbow (Top 3: #1)
  - 2017 UFC Upset of the Year vs. Joanna Jędrzejczyk
    - Sport360, Pundit Arena, Per Sources
- Submission of the Year
  - 2013 MMA Submission of the Year vs. Kathina Catron
    - World MMA Awards (nominee), MMA Weekly, The MMA Corner
  - 2013 Women's MMA Submission of the Year vs. Kathina Catron
    - Bleacher Report, Bloody Elbow, WMMA Press Association, Awakening Fighters, Promoting Real Women
  - 2015 Women's MMA Submission of the Year vs. Paige VanZant
    - Awakening Fighters
  - 2017 Women's MMA Submission of the Year vs. Michelle Waterson
    - Awakening Fighters (community)
- Knockout of the Year
  - 2017 Women's MMA Knockout of the Year vs. Joanna Jędrzejczyk
    - Awakening Fighters (community), Promoting Real Women
- Fight of the Year
  - 2013 Women's MMA Fight of the Year vs. Tecia Torres
    - Bleacher Report
- Fight of the Month
  - 2019 May Fight of the Month vs. Jéssica Andrade
    - MMA Junkie
  - 2020 July Fight of the Month vs. Jéssica Andrade
    - MMA Junkie
- Year's Most Violent
  - 2017 Fight Booth Lady Violence Award
  - Sherdog 2015 All-Violence Second Team: Strawweight
  - Sherdog 2017 All-Violence Second Team: Strawweight

== Pay-per-view bouts ==
No.	Event	Fight	Date	Venue	City	PPV Buys
1.	UFC 237	Namajunas vs. Andrade	May 11, 2019	Jeunesse Arena	Rio de Janeiro, Brazil	Not Disclosed

== Mixed martial arts record ==
Professional record breakdown
22 matches	14 wins	8 losses
By knockout	2	1
By submission	5	1
By decision	7	6

Res.	Record	Opponent	Method	Event	Date	Round	Time	Location	Notes
Loss	14–8	Natália Silva	Decision (unanimous)	UFC 324	January 24, 2026	3	5:00	Las Vegas, Nevada, United States	
Win	14–7	Miranda Maverick	Decision (unanimous)	UFC on ESPN: Usman vs. Buckley	June 14, 2025	3	5:00	Atlanta, Georgia, United States	
Loss	13–7	Erin Blanchfield	Decision (unanimous)	UFC Fight Night: Moreno vs. Albazi	November 2, 2024	5	5:00	Edmonton, Alberta, Canada	
Win	13–6	Tracy Cortez	Decision (unanimous)	UFC on ESPN: Namajunas vs. Cortez	July 13, 2024	5	5:00	Denver, Colorado, United States	
Win	12–6	Amanda Ribas	Decision (unanimous)	UFC on ESPN: Ribas vs. Namajunas	March 23, 2024	5	5:00	Las Vegas, Nevada, United States	
Loss	11–6	Manon Fiorot	Decision (unanimous)	UFC Fight Night: Gane vs. Spivac	September 2, 2023	3	5:00	Paris, France	Flyweight debut.
Loss	11–5	Carla Esparza	Decision (split)	UFC 274	May 7, 2022	5	5:00	Phoenix, Arizona, United States	Lost the UFC Women's Strawweight Championship.
Win	11–4	Zhang Weili	Decision (split)	UFC 268	November 6, 2021	5	5:00	New York City, New York, United States	Defended the UFC Women's Strawweight Championship.
Win	10–4	Zhang Weili	KO (head kick)	UFC 261	April 24, 2021	1	1:18	Jacksonville, Florida, United States	Won the UFC Women's Strawweight Championship. Performance of the Night.
Win	9–4	Jéssica Andrade	Decision (split)	UFC 251	July 12, 2020	3	5:00	Abu Dhabi, United Arab Emirates	Fight of the Night.
Loss	8–4	Jéssica Andrade	KO (slam)	UFC 237	May 11, 2019	2	2:58	Rio de Janeiro, Brazil	Lost the UFC Women's Strawweight Championship. Fight of the Night.
Win	8–3	Joanna Jędrzejczyk	Decision (unanimous)	UFC 223	April 7, 2018	5	5:00	Brooklyn, New York, United States	Defended the UFC Women's Strawweight Championship.
Win	7–3	Joanna Jędrzejczyk	TKO (punches)	UFC 217	November 4, 2017	1	3:03	New York City, New York, United States	Won the UFC Women's Strawweight Championship. Performance of the Night.
Win	6–3	Michelle Waterson	Submission (rear-naked choke)	UFC on Fox: Johnson vs. Reis	April 15, 2017	2	2:47	Kansas City, Missouri, United States	
Loss	5–3	Karolina Kowalkiewicz	Decision (split)	UFC 201	July 30, 2016	3	5:00	Atlanta, Georgia, United States	Fight of the Night.
Win	5–2	Tecia Torres	Decision (unanimous)	UFC on Fox: Teixeira vs. Evans	April 16, 2016	3	5:00	Tampa, Florida, United States	
Win	4–2	Paige VanZant	Submission (rear-naked choke)	UFC Fight Night: Namajunas vs. VanZant	December 10, 2015	5	2:25	Las Vegas, Nevada, United States	Performance of the Night.
Win	3–2	Angela Hill	Submission (rear-naked choke)	UFC 192	October 3, 2015	1	2:47	Houston, Texas, United States	
Loss	2–2	Carla Esparza	Submission (rear-naked choke)	The Ultimate Fighter: A Champion Will Be Crowned Finale	December 12, 2014	3	1:26	Las Vegas, Nevada, United States	For the inaugural UFC Women's Strawweight Championship. The Ultimate Fighter 20 Women's Strawweight Tournament Final.
Loss	2–1	Tecia Torres	Decision (unanimous)	Invicta FC 6	July 13, 2013	3	5:00	Kansas City, Missouri, United States	
Win	2–0	Kathina Catron	Submission (flying armbar)	Invicta FC 5	April 5, 2013	1	0:12	Kansas City, Missouri, United States	Submission of the Night.
Win	1–0	Emily Kagan	Submission (rear-naked choke)	Invicta FC 4	January 5, 2013	3	3:44	Kansas City, Kansas, United States	Strawweight debut. Submission of the Night.

Exhibition record breakdown		
3 matches	3 wins	0 losses
By submission	3	0

Res.	Record	Opponent	Method	Event	Date	Round	Time	Location	Notes
Win	3–0	Randa Markos	Submission (kimura)	The Ultimate Fighter: A Champion Will Be Crowned	August 14, 2014 (December 10, 2014 airdate)	1	2:45	Las Vegas, Nevada, United States	The Ultimate Fighter 20 Semifinal round.
Win	2–0	Joanne Calderwood	Submission (kimura)	The Ultimate Fighter: A Champion Will Be Crowned	August 6, 2014 (December 3, 2014 airdate)	2	2:06	Las Vegas, Nevada, United States	The Ultimate Fighter 20 Quarterfinal round.
Win	1–0	Alex Chambers	Submission (rear-naked choke)	The Ultimate Fighter: A Champion Will Be Crowned	July 28, 2014 (November 5, 2014 airdate)	1	4:38	Las Vegas, Nevada, United States	The Ultimate Fighter 20 Elimination round.

Amateur record breakdown		
4 matches	4 wins	0 losses
By knockout	2	0
By decision	2	0

Res.	Record	Opponent	Method	Event	Date	Round	Time	Location	Notes
Win	4–0	Jen Aniano	TKO (head kick and punches)	KOTC: Trump Card	30 June 2012	1	0:33	Lac du Flambeau, Wisconsin	Strawweight bout. Lake of the Torches Resort Casino
Win	3–0	Moriel Charneski	Decision (unanimous)	KOTC: March Mania	17 March 2012	3	3:00	Walker, Minnesota	130 lb bout. Northern Lights Casino.
Win	2–0	Heather Bassett	Decision (unanimous)	KOTC: Winter Warriors	10 December 2011	3	3:00	Walker, Minnesota	Flyweight bout. Judges scores: 30–28, 30–27, 29–28. Northern Lights Casino.
Win	1–0	Melissa Pacheco	TKO (punches)	North American Fight Championship: Relentless	7 August 2010	1	2:51	West Allis, Wisconsin	Flyweight bout. Main Stage, 2010 Wisconsin State Fair.

== Submission grappling record ==
Professional record breakdown
1 match	0 wins	1 loss
By submission	0	1

Result	Record	Opponent	Method	Event	Division	Type	Year	Location
Loss	0–1	(Canada) Gillian Robertson	Submission (rear-naked choke)	Fury Pro Grappling 6	Superfight	Nogi	December 30, 2022	(United States) Philadelphia, PA

== See also ==
- List of current UFC fighters
- List of female mixed martial artists

Achievements
Preceded by Joanna Jędrzejczyk	3rd UFC Women's Strawweight Champion; November 4, 2017 – May 11, 2019	Succeeded by Jéssica Andrade
Preceded by Zhang Weili	6th UFC Women's Strawweight Champion; April 24, 2021 – May 7, 2022	Succeeded by Carla Esparza
Awards
Preceded by Amanda Nunes	World MMA Female Fighter of the Year; 2017	Succeeded by Amanda Nunes
Preceded by Michael Bisping	World MMA Upset of the Year; 2017 vs. Joanna Jędrzejczyk at UFC 217	Succeeded by Amanda Nunes
Preceded by Amanda Nunes	World MMA Fighter of the Year; 2020–21	Succeeded by Valentina Shevchenko
