= Jéssica Andrade =

Brazilian mixed martial artist (born 1991)

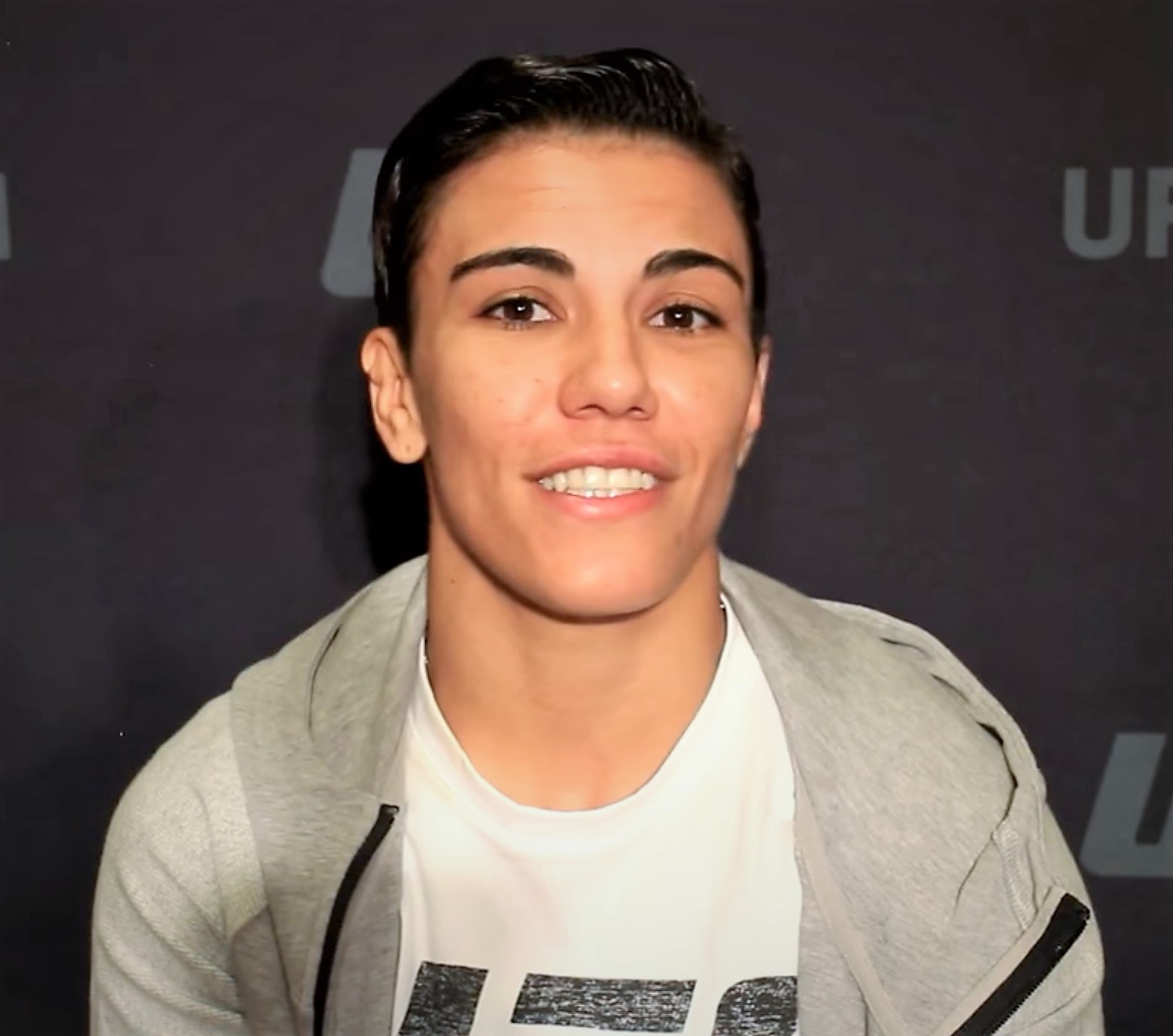
- Andrade at UFC 228 in 2018
- Born: Jéssica Fernanda da Costa Andrade; September 25, 1991 (age 35); Umuarama, Paraná, Brazil
- Nickname: Bate Estaca
- Height: 5 ft 2 in (157 cm)
- Weight: 115 lb (52 kg; 8 st 3 lb)
- Division: Strawweight (2016–2020, 2022–present); Flyweight (2020–2021, 2023-present); Bantamweight (2011–2015)
- Reach: 62 in (157 cm)
- Fighting out of: Las Vegas, Nevada, U.S.
- Team: Gracie Humaita (until 2013); Paraná Vale Tudo (2013–2024)
- Rank: Black belt in Brazilian Jiu-Jitsu under Gilliard Paraná
- Years active: 2011–present

Mixed martial arts record
- Total: 41
- Wins: 26
- By knockout: 10
- By submission: 8
- By decision: 8
- Losses: 15
- By knockout: 5
- By submission: 5
- By decision: 5

Other information
- Mixed martial arts record from Sherdog

Jéssica Fernanda da Costa Andrade (born September 25, 1991) is a Brazilian professional mixed martial artist. She currently competes in the women's Strawweight and Flyweight divisions of the Ultimate Fighting Championship (UFC), where she is a former UFC Women's Strawweight Champion, and a Flyweight title challenger.

== Background ==
Andrade was born on September 25, 1991, in Umuarama, Paraná, Brazil, to farmer parents Julio and Neusa Andrade. She is of Native Brazilian descent through her great-grandmother. Andrade and her older brother Fernando worked at their parents' plantation fields throughout their childhood until the farm was municipalized, leading to the prohibition of underage labor. At the age of 14, she started working at a fish & pay pond and later delivering medicine for a drug store. Andrade grew up playing soccer and futsal, aspiring to become a professional soccer player. She succeeded well and eventually got offered to play for a São Paulo club, but her parents forbade her from moving. During school, Andrade started training judo and shortly afterward, in 2011, jiu-jitsu.

Her teammates coined the nickname bate estaca (piledriver), a term used in Brazil for body slams (also known as Daki age), after one of her first amateur BJJ competitions, when Andrade was caught in an armlock, she panicked and performed the illegal move on her opponent by lifting her and then slamming her head directly into the mat. To Andrade's surprise, she was immediately disqualified.

== Mixed martial arts career ==
=== Early career ===
Andrade made her professional mixed martial arts debut on September 6, 2011. For the first six professional fights, Andrade trained at Gracie Humaita in Umuarama, but after beating Duda Yankovich, she moved to Niterói in order to train at Paraná Vale Tudo. She won eight of her first ten fights in her native Brazil.

On April 14, 2013, Andrade fought outside of Brazil for the first time when she submitted Milana Dudieva at ProFC 47: Russia vs. Europe in Rostov-on-Don, Russia.

=== Ultimate Fighting Championship ===
Andrade made her UFC debut against Liz Carmouche, as a replacement for Miesha Tate, at UFC on Fox: Johnson vs. Moraga on July 23, 2013. This marked the first time that two openly gay fighters went head-to-head in the UFC. Andrade lost the fight via TKO in the second round.

Andrade's second UFC appearance took place on October 26, 2013, when she faced Rosi Sexton at UFC Fight Night 30. She won the fight via dominant unanimous decision.

Andrade was expected to face TUF 18 women's winner Julianna Peña at UFC 171. However, Peña pulled out of the bout, after suffering an injury to her right knee, and she was replaced by Raquel Pennington. Andrade won the back-and-forth fight via split decision.

As the first bout of her new four-fight contract, Andrade was expected to face Valérie Létourneau on September 13, 2014, at UFC Fight Night 51. However, Létourneau withdrew due to an injury and Andrade instead faced UFC newcomer Larissa Pacheco. She won the fight via submission in the first round.

Andrade faced Marion Reneau on February 22, 2015, at UFC Fight Night 61. Andrade lost the fight as she was quickly submitted via a triangle choke in the first round.

Andrade faced Sarah Moras on July 15, 2015, at UFC Fight Night: Mir vs. Duffee. She won the fight by unanimous decision.

Andrade made a quick turnaround, as she replaced an injured Liz Carmouche to take on Raquel Pennington at UFC 191. She lost the fight by submission in the second round.

==== Move to strawweight ====
In October 2015, Andrade announced her decision to move to the strawweight division. Andrade then faced former title challenger Jessica Penne at her new weight class on June 4, 2016, at UFC 199, winning the one-sided bout via TKO in the second round.

Andrade next faced Joanne Calderwood on September 10, 2016, at UFC 203. She won the fight via submission in the first round.

As the first bout of her new eight-fight contract, Andrade was scheduled to face Maryna Moroz at UFC 207 on 30 December 2016. Nevertheless, Moroz withdrew from the bout citing an injury and Invicta FC Strawweight Champion Angela Hill was briefly linked as a replacement. However, the fight never materialized for that event because of a rule in the UFC's anti-doping policy with USADA. Subsequently, Andrade was removed from that card with the pairing left intact and rescheduled to take place at UFC Fight Night: Bermudez vs. The Korean Zombie on February 4, 2017. Andrade won the fight by unanimous decision. In addition, both participants were awarded Fight of the Night honors.

==== Title contention and UFC champion ====
Andrade faced Joanna Jędrzejczyk for the UFC Women's Strawweight Championship on May 13, 2017, at UFC 211 in Dallas, Texas. She lost the fight via unanimous decision.

Andrade faced Cláudia Gadelha at UFC Fight Night: Saint Preux vs. Okami on September 23, 2017. She won the fight via unanimous decision (30–25, 30–26, and 30–27). This fight earned Andrade her second Fight of the Night bonus award.

Andrade faced Tecia Torres on February 24, 2018, at UFC on Fox 28. She won the fight via unanimous decision.

Andrade faced Karolina Kowalkiewicz on September 8, 2018, at UFC 228. She won the fight via knockout in the first round. This win earned her the Performance of the Night award.

Andrade faced Rose Namajunas on May 11, 2019, for the UFC Women's Strawweight Championship in the main event at UFC 237. She won the fight via knockout (slam) in the second round. This win earned her the Fight of the Night and Performance of the Night award.

In the first defense of her title, Andrade faced Zhang Weili on August 31, 2019, in the main event at UFC on ESPN+ 15. She lost the fight via first-round technical knockout.

Andrade was scheduled to face Rose Namajunas for a rematch on April 18, 2020, at UFC 249. On April 9, 2020, Namajunas pulled out for undisclosed reasons. Instead the bout was rescheduled and eventually took place on July 12, 2020, at UFC 251. Andrade lost the fight via split decision. This fight earned her the Fight of the Night award.

==== Flyweight ====
On the heels of two consecutive losses at strawweight, Andrade fought Katlyn Chookagian in a flyweight bout on October 18, 2020, at UFC Fight Night: Ortega vs. The Korean Zombie. Andrade defeated Chookagian by technical knockout in the first round to become the first woman in the UFC to win in three different weight divisions (bantamweight, strawweight, and flyweight). This win earned her the Performance of the Night award.

Andrade faced Valentina Shevchenko for the UFC Women's Flyweight Championship on April 24, 2021, at UFC 261. She was dominated throughout the bout and lost in the second round via elbows while in the crucifix position.

Andrade faced Cynthia Calvillo on September 25, 2021, at UFC 266. She won the fight via technical knockout in round one.

Andrade faced Amanda Lemos in a Strawweight bout on April 23, 2022, at UFC Fight Night 205. She won the fight via a standing arm-triangle choke in round one, marking the first time this submission has been landed in UFC history. This win earned her the Performance of the Night award.

Andrade, replacing Katlyn Chookagian, was scheduled to face Manon Fiorot on September 3, 2022, at UFC Fight Night 209. However, Andrade withdrew in mid July due to undisclosed reasons and was replaced by Fiorot's original opponent Chookagian.

Andrade faced Lauren Murphy on January 21, 2023, at UFC 283. She won the fight via unanimous decision.

Andrade faced Erin Blanchfield, replacing Taila Santos on February 18, 2023, at UFC Fight Night 219. Prior to the bout, Andrade signed a new four-fight contract with the organization. She lost the fight via submission in round two.

==== Return to strawweight ====
Andrade faced Yan Xiaonan on May 6, 2023, at UFC 288. She lost the fight via knockout in the first round.

Andrande, replacing Virna Jandiroba, faced Tatiana Suarez on August 5, 2023, at UFC Fight Night 226. She lost the fight via a guillotine choke submission in the second round.

Andrade faced Mackenzie Dern at UFC 295 on November 11, 2023. She won by TKO and broke the record for most knockdowns landed in a bout by a woman in UFC history. This fight also earned her the Performance of the Night award, which put her in the lead for the most awards by a woman in UFC history with six.

Andrade faced Marina Rodriguez on April 13, 2024, at UFC 300. She won the bout by split decision.

==== Back to flyweight ====
Andrade faced Natália Silva on September 7, 2024, in a flyweight bout at UFC Fight Night 242. She lost the fight by unanimous decision. This fight earned her another Fight of the Night award.

Andrade faced Jasmine Jasudavicius on May 10, 2025, at UFC 315. She lost the fight via a rear-naked choke submission in the first round.

==== Return to Strawweight ====
Andrade faced former LFA Women's Strawweight Champion Loopy Godínez on August 16, 2025, at UFC 319. She lost the fight by unanimous decision.

== Championships and accomplishments ==
- Ultimate Fighting Championship
  - UFC Women's Strawweight Championship (One time; former)
  - Performance of the Night (Six times) vs. Joanne Calderwood, Karolina Kowalkiewicz, Rose Namajunas, Katlyn Chookagian, Amanda Lemos and Mackenzie Dern
    - Most Performance of the Night bonuses in UFC Women's history (6)
  - Fight of the Night (Five times) vs. Angela Hill, Cláudia Gadelha, Rose Namajunas (x2) and Natália Silva
    - Most Fight of the Night bonuses in UFC Women's history (5)
    - Most Post-Fight bonuses in UFC Women's history (11)
    - Most Post-Fight bonuses in UFC Women's Strawweight division history (9)
  - Most wins in UFC Women's history (17)
  - Tied (Angela Hill) for the most bouts in UFC Women's history (30)
  - Third most finishes in UFC Women's history (9) (behind Amanda Nunes & Gillian Robertson)
  - Tied (Joanna Jędrzejczyk, Carla Esparza & Zhang Weili) for fourth most wins in UFC Women's Strawweight division history (10)
  - Most finishes in UFC Women's Strawweight division history (6)
  - Tied (Denise Gomes) for most knockouts in UFC Women's Strawweight division history (4)
  - Second most knockdowns landed in UFC Women's Strawweight division history (5)
    - Most knockdowns landed in a fight in UFC Women's Strawweight division and UFC Women's history (4) (vs. Mackenzie Dern)
    - Tied for third most knockdowns landed in a fight in UFC history (4)
  - Tied (Ailín Pérez) for most takedowns landed in a UFC Women's bout (10) (vs. Tecia Torres)
  - Tied (Carla Esparza) for fifth most bouts in UFC Women's Strawweight division history (15)
  - Sixth most takedowns landed in UFC Women's Strawweight division history (24)
  - Fourth least bottom position time in UFC Women's Strawweight division history (2:28)
  - Fourth lowest bottom position percentage in UFC Women's Strawweight division history (1.72%)
  - Fifth most significant strikes landed in UFC Women's Strawweight division history (912)
  - Third most strikes landed-per-minute in UFC Women's Strawweight division history (6.35)
  - Fourth highest takedown percentage in UFC Women's Strawweight division history (54.6%)
  - Fifth highest takedown defense percentage in UFC Women's Strawweight division history (80.0%)
  - Only woman in UFC history to win a fight in three weight classes
  - Most bouts by a woman in a calendar year in UFC history (5 in 2023)
    - Tied for most bouts in a calendar year in UFC history (5 in 2023)
  - Most significant strikes landed in a UFC Women's Flyweight bout (231) vs Lauren Murphy
  - First standing arm-triangle choke finish in UFC History
  - UFC Honors Awards
    - 2019: Fan's Choice Comeback of the Year Nominee vs. Rose Namajunas 1
    - 2022: President's Choice Performance of the Year Nominee vs. Amanda Lemos & Fan's Choice Submission of the Year Nominee vs. Amanda Lemos
  - UFC.com Awards
    - 2017: Ranked #8 Fight of the Year vs. Angela Hill
    - 2018: Ranked #7 Knockout of the Year vs. Karolina Kowalkiewicz
    - 2019: Ranked #8 Knockout of the Year vs. Rose Namajunas 1 & Ranked #6 Upset of the Year vs. Rose Namajunas 1
    - 2020: Ranked #7 Fight of the Year vs. Rose Namajunas 2
    - 2022: Submission of the Year vs. Amanda Lemos
- MMA Junkie
  - 2017 #5 Ranked Fight of the Year vs. Cláudia Gadelha at UFC Fight Night: Saint Preux vs. Okami
  - 2017 September Fight of the Month vs. Cláudia Gadelha
  - 2019 May Fight of the Month vs. Rose Namajunas
  - 2020 July Fight of the Month vs. Rose Namajunas
  - 2022 April Submission of the Month vs. Amanda Lemos
- LowKick MMA
  - 2022 Submission of the Year vs. Amanda Lemos at UFC Fight Night: Lemos vs. Andrade
- Bleacher Report
  - 2022 UFC Submission of the Year vs. Amanda Lemos
- CBS Sports
  - 2019 #5 Ranked UFC Knockout of the Year vs. Rose Namajunas
- MMA Fighting
  - 2023 Third Team MMA All-Star

== Personal life ==
Andrade married her longtime girlfriend Fernanda (née Gomes) in 2019. The couple divorced some time in 2023.

In 2024, Andrade filed a lawsuit in the United States against former coach and manager Gilliard Paranal, who managed her from 2012 to 2024, for embezzlement.

== Mixed martial arts record ==
Professional record breakdown
41 matches	26 wins	15 losses
By knockout	10	5
By submission	8	5
By decision	8	5

Res.	Record	Opponent	Method	Event	Date	Round	Time	Location	Notes
Loss	26–15	Loopy Godínez	Decision (unanimous)	UFC 319	August 16, 2025	3	5:00	Chicago, Illinois, United States	Return to Strawweight.
Loss	26–14	Jasmine Jasudavicius	Submission (rear-naked choke)	UFC 315	May 10, 2025	1	2:40	Montreal, Quebec, Canada	
Loss	26–13	Natália Silva	Decision (unanimous)	UFC Fight Night: Burns vs. Brady	September 7, 2024	3	5:00	Las Vegas, Nevada, United States	Return to Flyweight. Fight of the Night.
Win	26–12	Marina Rodriguez	Decision (split)	UFC 300	April 13, 2024	3	5:00	Las Vegas, Nevada, United States	
Win	25–12	Mackenzie Dern	TKO (punches)	UFC 295	November 11, 2023	2	3:15	New York City, New York, United States	Performance of the Night.
Loss	24–12	Tatiana Suarez	Submission (guillotine choke)	UFC on ESPN: Sandhagen vs. Font	August 5, 2023	2	1:31	Nashville, Tennessee, United States	
Loss	24–11	Yan Xiaonan	KO (punches)	UFC 288	May 6, 2023	1	2:20	Newark, New Jersey, United States	Return to Strawweight.
Loss	24–10	Erin Blanchfield	Submission (rear-naked choke)	UFC Fight Night: Andrade vs. Blanchfield	February 18, 2023	2	1:37	Las Vegas, Nevada, United States	
Win	24–9	Lauren Murphy	Decision (unanimous)	UFC 283	January 21, 2023	3	5:00	Rio de Janeiro, Brazil	
Win	23–9	Amanda Lemos	Submission (arm-triangle choke)	UFC Fight Night: Lemos vs. Andrade	April 23, 2022	1	3:13	Las Vegas, Nevada, United States	Strawweight bout. Performance of the Night.
Win	22–9	Cynthia Calvillo	TKO (punches)	UFC 266	September 25, 2021	1	4:54	Las Vegas, Nevada, United States	
Loss	21–9	Valentina Shevchenko	TKO (elbows)	UFC 261	April 24, 2021	2	3:19	Jacksonville, Florida, United States	For the UFC Women's Flyweight Championship.
Win	21–8	Katlyn Chookagian	KO (punches to the body)	UFC Fight Night: Ortega vs. The Korean Zombie	October 18, 2020	1	4:55	Abu Dhabi, United Arab Emirates	Flyweight debut. Performance of the Night.
Loss	20–8	Rose Namajunas	Decision (split)	UFC 251	July 12, 2020	3	5:00	Abu Dhabi, United Arab Emirates	Fight of the Night.
Loss	20–7	Zhang Weili	TKO (knees and punches)	UFC Fight Night: Andrade vs. Zhang	August 31, 2019	1	0:42	Shenzhen, China	Lost the UFC Women's Strawweight Championship.
Win	20–6	Rose Namajunas	KO (slam)	UFC 237	May 11, 2019	2	2:58	Rio de Janeiro, Brazil	Won the UFC Women's Strawweight Championship. Performance of the Night. Fight of the Night.
Win	19–6	Karolina Kowalkiewicz	KO (punch)	UFC 228	September 8, 2018	1	1:58	Dallas, Texas, United States	Performance of the Night.
Win	18–6	Tecia Torres	Decision (unanimous)	UFC on Fox: Emmett vs. Stephens	February 24, 2018	3	5:00	Orlando, Florida, United States	
Win	17–6	Cláudia Gadelha	Decision (unanimous)	UFC Fight Night: Saint Preux vs. Okami	September 23, 2017	3	5:00	Saitama, Japan	Fight of the Night.
Loss	16–6	Joanna Jędrzejczyk	Decision (unanimous)	UFC 211	May 13, 2017	5	5:00	Dallas, Texas, United States	For the UFC Women's Strawweight Championship.
Win	16–5	Angela Hill	Decision (unanimous)	UFC Fight Night: Bermudez vs. The Korean Zombie	February 4, 2017	3	5:00	Houston, Texas, United States	Fight of the Night.
Win	15–5	Joanne Calderwood	Submission (guillotine choke)	UFC 203	September 10, 2016	1	4:38	Cleveland, Ohio, United States	Performance of the Night.
Win	14–5	Jessica Penne	TKO (punches)	UFC 199	June 4, 2016	2	2:56	Inglewood, California, United States	Strawweight debut.
Loss	13–5	Raquel Pennington	Submission (rear-naked choke)	UFC 191	September 5, 2015	2	4:58	Las Vegas, Nevada, United States	
Win	13–4	Sarah Moras	Decision (unanimous)	UFC Fight Night: Mir vs. Duffee	July 15, 2015	3	5:00	San Diego, California, United States	
Loss	12–4	Marion Reneau	Submission (triangle choke)	UFC Fight Night: Bigfoot vs. Mir	February 22, 2015	1	1:54	Porto Alegre, Brazil	
Win	12–3	Larissa Pacheco	Submission (guillotine choke)	UFC Fight Night: Bigfoot vs. Arlovski	September 13, 2014	1	4:33	Brasília, Brazil	
Win	11–3	Raquel Pennington	Decision (split)	UFC 171	March 15, 2014	3	5:00	Dallas, Texas, United States	
Win	10–3	Rosi Sexton	Decision (unanimous)	UFC Fight Night: Machida vs. Muñoz	October 26, 2013	3	5:00	Manchester, England	
Loss	9–3	Liz Carmouche	TKO (punches and elbows)	UFC on Fox: Johnson vs. Moraga	July 27, 2013	2	3:57	Seattle, Washington, United States	
Win	9–2	Milana Dudieva	Submission (guillotine choke)	ProFC 47	April 14, 2013	2	4:34	Rostov-on-Don, Russia	Catchweight (137 lb) bout.
Win	8–2	Luciana Pereira	Submission (rear-naked choke)	Webfight Combat 1	January 27, 2013	2	3:35	Rio de Janeiro, Brazil	
Loss	7–2	Jennifer Maia	Decision (unanimous)	Samurai FC 9	December 15, 2012	3	5:00	Curitiba, Brazil	
Win	7–1	Vanessa Silva	TKO (punches)	Heavy FC 2	October 13, 2012	1	1:15	Cascavel, Brazil	
Win	6–1	Alessandra Silva	Submission (guillotine choke)	Strike Combat	September 15, 2012	1	3:29	Foz do Iguaçu, Brazil	
Win	5–1	Duda Yankovich	Submission (guillotine choke)	Bitetti Combat 12	September 8, 2012	1	3:02	Rio de Janeiro, Brazil	
Win	4–1	Juliana Silva	Submission (guillotine choke)	Ring of Fire 4:	August 28, 2012	1	1:14	Presidente Venceslau, Brazil	
Win	3–1	Lilian Correia	KO (punch to the body)	Heavy FC 1	May 20, 2012	2	N/A	Cascavel, Brazil	
Loss	2–1	Kinberly Novaes	TKO (punches and knees)	Nitrix: Champion Fight 11	May 5, 2012	2	2:42	Joinville, Brazil	
Win	2–0	Bruna Fernandes	TKO (punches)	Wako Grand Prix 3	November 19, 2011	1	2:06	Avaré, Brazil	
Win	1–0	Weidy Borges	TKO (punches)	Sagaz Combat	September 6, 2011	2	3:40	Umuarama, Brazil	

== Pay-per-view bouts ==
No.	Event	Fight	Date	Venue	City	PPV Buys
1.	UFC 237	Namajunas vs. Andrade	May 11, 2019	Jeunesse Arena	Rio de Janeiro, Brazil	Not Disclosed

== See also ==
- List of current UFC fighters
- List of female mixed martial artists
