= Carla Esparza =

American mixed martial artist (born 1987)

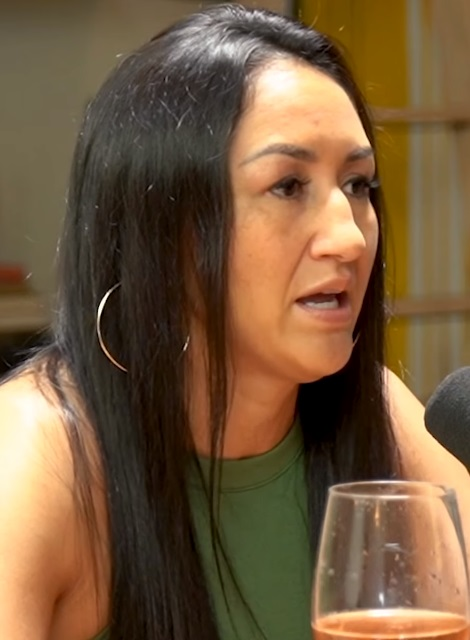
- Esparza in 2022
- Born: Carla Kristen Esparza; October 10, 1987 (age 39); Torrance, California, U.S.
- Other names: Cookie Monster
- Height: 5 ft 1 in (1.55 m)
- Weight: 115 lb (52 kg; 8.2 st)
- Division: Strawweight
- Reach: 63 in (160 cm)
- Style: Wrestling
- Fighting out of: Irvine, California, U.S.
- Team: Team Oyama
- Rank: Brown belt in Brazilian Jiu-Jitsu
- Wrestling: NAIA wrestling
- Years active: 2010–2024

Mixed martial arts record
- Total: 27
- Wins: 19
- By knockout: 4
- By submission: 4
- By decision: 11
- Losses: 8
- By knockout: 2
- By submission: 2
- By decision: 4

Other information
- Mixed martial arts record from Sherdog

Carla Kristen Esparza (born October 10, 1987) is an American former professional mixed martial artist and wrestler who most recently competed in the women's Strawweight division of the Ultimate Fighting Championship (UFC), where she is a former two-time UFC Women's Strawweight Champion. Esparza was the first UFC Strawweight Champion, the first Invicta FC Strawweight Champion, and was generally considered the best Strawweight fighter in the world during both title reigns. She first earned the UFC championship by winning a 16-woman tournament that was televised on the reality series The Ultimate Fighter. She also competed in Bellator MMA's first women's tournament.

== Amateur and collegiate wrestling ==
Carla Esparza's path to mixed martial arts (MMA) began when she started wrestling for the varsity team during her junior year at Redondo Union High School in Redondo Beach, California. After winning multiple regional and national high-school wrestling tournaments, Esparza was awarded a scholarship to Menlo College, a NAIA Division school in northern California, to wrestle under coach and former two-time Olympian Lee Allen.

In 2008 and 2009, Esparza was a women's wrestling All-American with the Menlo Oaks.

While in college, Esparza started training in Brazilian jiu-jitsu at the Gracie Academy in Torrance under Rener, Ryron, and Ralek Gracie. She then expanded her mixed martial arts repertoire when she began training at Team Oyama during the summer of her junior year of college.

== Mixed martial arts career ==
=== Bellator ===
In August 2010, only six months after her pro debut and with just three professional MMA fights, Esparza was called in by Bellator MMA as a last-minute replacement for Angela Magaña, who was forced to withdraw from her upcoming fight due to a foot injury. Esparza was inserted in the bracket of the Bellator Season 3 115 lb women's tournament at Bellator 24. On just three days' notice, Esparza's opponent in the quarterfinal round was the undefeated and then #1 pound-for-pound female MMA fighter in the world, Megumi Fujii. Esparza lost the fight to the heavily favored Fujii via second-round armbar submission.

In June 2011, Esparza returned to the Bellator cage and faced fellow Season 3 tournament challenger Jessica Aguilar at Bellator 46. After a three-round back and forth battle, Aguilar defeated Esparza via split decision.

=== XFC and MEZ Sports ===
On December 2, 2011, Esparza made her XFC debut against Felice Herrig at XFC 15: Tribute in Tampa, Florida. She defeated Herrig via unanimous decision.

Three months later, Esparza was scheduled to face Angela Magana at Pandemonium VI for the MEZ Sports women's flyweight title. Unfortunately, Magana was involved in a car accident on the day of the fight while in transit to the Riverside Convention Center, where the event was being staged. Magana re-broke her back in the collision and was unable to compete in the fight.

=== Invicta FC ===
In May 2012, it was announced that Esparza had signed with the upstart all-female Invicta Fighting Championships promotion.

On July 28, 2012, Esparza made her Invicta debut at the promotion's second event, entitled Invicta FC 2: Baszler vs. McMann, and faced Sarah Schneider on the preliminary card. Esparza won the fight via TKO (punches) at 4:28 of round two.

Esparza returned to Invicta to face Lynn Alvarez at Invicta FC 3: Penne vs. Sugiyama on October 6, 2012. She defeated Alvarez via TKO (punches) at 2:53 of round one.

==== Strawweight Championship ====
Esparza was expected to face Ayaka Hamasaki for the Invicta FC Strawweight Championship at Invicta FC 4: Esparza vs. Hyatt on January 5, 2013. However, Hamasaki withdrew from the fight in order to defend her Jewels Lightweight title in Japan. Esparza was then set to face Brazilian jiu-jitsu black belt Cláudia Gadelha in the Invicta FC 4 main event, but Gadelha broke her nose in training and was forced to withdraw.

Esparza ultimately faced Bec Hyatt for the Invicta FC Strawweight Championship. Esparza won the fight via unanimous decision to become the first Invicta FC Strawweight Champion.

Esparza agreed to defend her title against Ayaka Hamasaki at Invicta FC 6: Coenen vs. Cyborg on July 13, 2013. However, on June 4 she withdrew from the fight due to a knee injury.

On December 7, 2013, Esparza was set to defend her strawweight title against Cláudia Gadelha at Invicta FC 7. However, on the day of the event, Gadelha was taken to the hospital due to a bacterial infection and the fight was canceled. Esparza vacated the title on December 11, 2013 to compete on The Ultimate Fighter.

=== The Ultimate Fighter ===
On December 11, 2013, it was announced that Esparza was signed by the Ultimate Fighting Championship (UFC) along with 10 other strawweight fighters to compete on season 20 of The Ultimate Fighter, which would crown the first ever UFC Strawweight Champion.

Esparza was the top seed in the tournament. She faced Angela Hill in the preliminary round and won via submission in the first round. In the quarterfinal round, she faced Tecia Torres and won the fight via majority decision. She then faced teammate Jessica Penne in the semifinal, and won by unanimous decision.

=== Ultimate Fighting Championship ===
By winning the tournament on The Ultimate Fighter, Esparza advanced to the final on December 12, 2014, against Rose Namajunas.

==== Strawweight Champion ====
"She did an outstanding job. Standing on her feet and on the ground, she completely dominated. She took her down at will. I say it every season but the best rise to the top on the show, and she definitely did tonight."

— UFC President Dana White on Esparza's title victory

After dominating much of the fight with her grappling and ground strikes, Esparza defeated Namajunas via rear-naked choke in the third round to become the inaugural UFC Strawweight Champion. The result also earned Esparza a Performance of the Night bonus.

Kevin Iole of Yahoo Sports noted, "Namajunas tapped at 1:26 of the third round, but the fight was over long before that. Esparza was too strong, too smart and simply too good for the far less experienced Namajunas." He went on to state that "Esparza dominated her three fights on the reality show and was no less dominant on Saturday. There is clearly a gap between Esparza and the next level of challengers". Following the fight, Brad Walker of MMATorch declared, "Esparza is the best fighter in her division in the world, not just in the UFC."

In her first title defense, Esparza faced kickboxer Joanna Jędrzejczyk on March 14, 2015, at UFC 185. Prior to the fight, Jędrzejczyk stated, "I have lots of respect for her." She also noted, "I know she's not going to give up easy, so it's going to be a tough fight for me and for her." Throughout the bout, Esparza was out-struck while standing and unable to keep Jędrzejczyk on the mat. Jędrzejczyk won via TKO in the second round. In an interview afterward, Esparza noted, "She had great takedown defense, obviously. I feel like I wasn't really setting it up, but that's on me." She went on to state, "There's never any excuses. I fought my fight and I lost tonight. She did a great job."

Esparza underwent shoulder surgery in mid-2015 and subsequently was out of action for the rest of the year.

==== Rebound ====
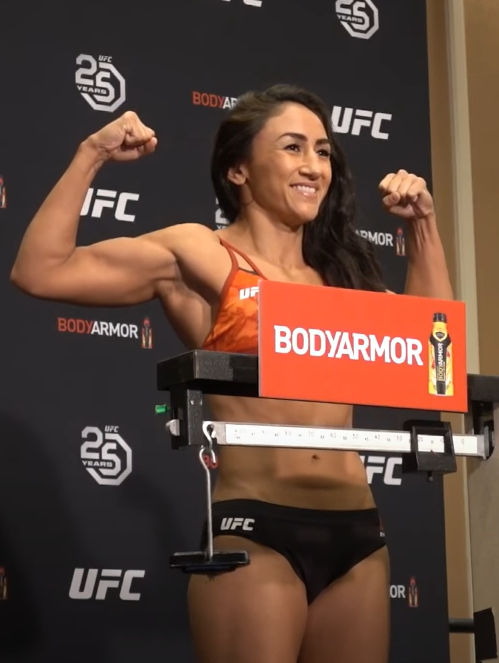
Carla Esparza at UFC 228 Weigh-In

Esparza returned at UFC 197 on April 23, 2016, defeating Juliana Lima via unanimous decision. Esparza, who stepped in for Jessica Aguilar, noted, "I took this fight semi-last minute, and I kind of wanted it that way too. Even though I wasn't in the best shape I wanted to be, I just kind of wanted to avoid the stress of a long camp." She also stated, "It's a huge relief off my shoulders to go out there and get my hand raised."

Esparza next faced Randa Markos on February 19, 2017 at UFC Fight Night: Lewis vs. Browne. She lost the fight via controversial split decision. 19 of 23 media outlets scored the fight 29-28 for Esparza.

Esparza faced Maryna Moroz on June 25, 2017 at UFC Fight Night 112. She won the fight via unanimous decision.

Esparza faced Cynthia Calvillo on December 30, 2017 at UFC 219. She won the fight via unanimous decision.

Esparza faced Cláudia Gadelha on June 9, 2018 at UFC 225. She lost the fight via split decision.

Esparza faced Tatiana Suarez on September 8, 2018 at UFC 228. Esparza lost the fight via TKO in the third round.

Esparza was scheduled to face Lívia Renata Souza on April 27, 2019 at UFC Fight Night: Jacaré vs. Hermansson. However, it was reported that Souza pulled out of the bout, citing ankle injury and was replaced by promotional newcomer Virna Jandiroba. Esparza won the fight via unanimous decision.

Esparza faced Alexa Grasso on September 21, 2019 at UFC Fight Night 159. She won the fight via majority decision. This fight earned her the Fight of the Night award, the first of her UFC career.

Esparza was scheduled to face Michelle Waterson on April 11, 2020 at UFC Fight Night: Overeem vs. Harris. Due to the COVID-19 pandemic, the event was eventually postponed and the bout eventually took place on May 9, 2020 at UFC 249. She won the fight via split decision.

On June 3, 2020, Esparza's manager announced that she had signed a new four-fight deal with the UFC.

Esparza was expected to face Marina Rodriguez on July 15, 2020 at UFC Fight Night 172. However the bout was cancelled after one of Rodriguez's cornermen tested positive for COVID-19. The pair eventually fought at UFC on ESPN 14 on July 26, 2020. Esparza won the fight via split decision.

Esparza was expected to face Amanda Ribas on December 12, 2020 at UFC 256. However on October 9, it was announced that Esparza was pulled due to undisclosed reasons.

Esparza faced Yan Xiaonan on May 22, 2021 at UFC Fight Night 188. She won the bout via TKO after dominating Yan on the ground throughout the bout. This win earned her the Performance of the Night award.

==== Second championship reign ====
Esparza faced Rose Namajunas in a rematch for the UFC Women's Strawweight Championship on May 7, 2022 at UFC 274. Esparza won a largely uneventful fight by split decision to claim the UFC Women's Strawweight Championship for a second time. Alongside the UFC 248 main event, it was widely regarded as one of the most boring UFC title fights of all time. With the victory, Esparza set a record for longest time between UFC title reigns by any fighter, male or female, at 2,612 days.

In her first defense, Esparza faced Zhang Weili on November 12, 2022, at UFC 281. She lost the bout and the belt by way of a rear-naked choke submission in the second round.

==== Retirement bout ====
Esparza faced Tecia Pennington on October 5, 2024 at UFC 307. She lost the fight by unanimous decision and retired after the bout.

== Grappling career ==
Esparza stepped up on short notice to replace Rose Namajunas in a grappling match against Danielle Kelly at Fury Pro Grappling 3 on December 30, 2021. After a tough match, Esparza slammed Kelly from full guard and the resulting clash of heads opened up a cut above Esparza's eyebrow. The doctors attending called the match off and the victory was awarded to Kelly as a result of the injury.

== Fighting style ==
Esparza is known for powerful wrestling and Brazilian jiu-jitsu. On the mat, she often mounts an opponent and controls her with strikes while seeking submissions. While standing, she typically clinches and attacks with punches, knees and elbows.

== Championships and accomplishments ==
- Ultimate Fighting Championship
  - UFC Women's Strawweight Championship (Two times; first)
    - Longest time between title reigns in UFC history (2,612 days)
  - The Ultimate Fighter 20 Tournament Winner
  - Fight of the Night (One time) vs. Alexa Grasso
  - Performance of the Night (Two times) vs. Rose Namajunas 1 and Yan Xiaonan
  - Tied (Joanna Jedrzejczyk, Jéssica Andrade & Zhang Weili) for fourth most wins in the UFC Women's Strawweight division history (10)
  - Fifth most bouts in UFC Women's Strawweight division history (16)
  - Most takedowns landed in the UFC Women's Strawweight division history (48)
  - Tied (Yan Xiaonan, Tatiana Suarez & Loopy Godínez) for the second longest win streak in UFC Women's Strawweight division history (6)
  - Most split decision wins in the UFC Women's Strawweight division history (3)
  - UFC.com Awards
    - 2014: Ranked #10 Newcomer of the Year (Tied with Paige VanZant & Henry Cejudo)
    - 2017: Ranked #9 Upset of the Year vs. Cynthia Calvillo
    - 2022: Half-Year Awards: Biggest Upset of the 1HY & Ranked #2 Upset of the Year vs. Rose Namajunas 2
- Invicta FC
  - Invicta FC Strawweight Championship (One time; first)
- Combat Press
  - 2014 Female Fighter of the Year
- MMAWeekly.com
  - 2014 Female Fighter of the Year

=== Submission grappling ===
- Pan-American Championship
  - 2013 Pan-American Jiu-Jitsu Championship - Silver medalist, female blue belt featherweight

== Personal life ==
Esparza is of Mexican, Ecuadorian and Irish descent. She married her husband Matthew Lomeli in May 2022. In March 2023, Esparza announced she was pregnant with the couple's first child. Their first child, a son, was born in late September 2023.

== Mixed martial arts record ==
Professional record breakdown
27 matches	19 wins	8 losses
By knockout	4	2
By submission	4	2
By decision	11	4

Res.	Record	Opponent	Method	Event	Date	Round	Time	Location	Notes
Loss	19–8	Tecia Pennington	Decision (unanimous)	UFC 307	October 5, 2024	3	5:00	Salt Lake City, Utah, United States	
Loss	19–7	Zhang Weili	Submission (rear-naked choke)	UFC 281	November 12, 2022	2	1:05	New York City, New York, United States	Lost the UFC Women's Strawweight Championship.
Win	19–6	Rose Namajunas	Decision (split)	UFC 274	May 7, 2022	5	5:00	Phoenix, Arizona, United States	Won the UFC Women's Strawweight Championship.
Win	18–6	Yan Xiaonan	TKO (punches)	UFC Fight Night: Font vs. Garbrandt	May 22, 2021	2	2:58	Las Vegas, Nevada, United States	Performance of the Night.
Win	17–6	Marina Rodriguez	Decision (split)	UFC on ESPN: Whittaker vs. Till	July 26, 2020	3	5:00	Abu Dhabi, United Arab Emirates	
Win	16–6	Michelle Waterson	Decision (split)	UFC 249	May 9, 2020	3	5:00	Jacksonville, Florida, United States	
Win	15–6	Alexa Grasso	Decision (majority)	UFC Fight Night: Rodríguez vs. Stephens	September 21, 2019	3	5:00	Mexico City, Mexico	Fight of the Night.
Win	14–6	Virna Jandiroba	Decision (unanimous)	UFC Fight Night: Jacaré vs. Hermansson	April 27, 2019	3	5:00	Sunrise, Florida, United States	
Loss	13–6	Tatiana Suarez	TKO (punches and elbows)	UFC 228	September 8, 2018	3	4:33	Dallas, Texas, United States	
Loss	13–5	Cláudia Gadelha	Decision (split)	UFC 225	June 9, 2018	3	5:00	Chicago, Illinois, United States	
Win	13–4	Cynthia Calvillo	Decision (unanimous)	UFC 219	December 30, 2017	3	5:00	Las Vegas, Nevada, United States	Calvillo tested positive for marijuana metabolites.
Win	12–4	Maryna Moroz	Decision (unanimous)	UFC Fight Night: Chiesa vs. Lee	June 25, 2017	3	5:00	Oklahoma City, Oklahoma, United States	
Loss	11–4	Randa Markos	Decision (split)	UFC Fight Night: Lewis vs. Browne	February 19, 2017	3	5:00	Halifax, Nova Scotia, Canada	
Win	11–3	Juliana Lima	Decision (unanimous)	UFC 197	April 23, 2016	3	5:00	Las Vegas, Nevada, United States	
Loss	10–3	Joanna Jędrzejczyk	TKO (punches)	UFC 185	March 14, 2015	2	4:17	Dallas, Texas, United States	Lost the UFC Women's Strawweight Championship.
Win	10–2	Rose Namajunas	Submission (rear-naked choke)	The Ultimate Fighter: A Champion Will Be Crowned Finale	December 12, 2014	3	1:26	Las Vegas, Nevada, United States	Won the inaugural UFC Women's Strawweight Championship. Won The Ultimate Fighter 20 Women's Strawweight Tournament. Performance of the Night.
Win	9–2	Bec Rawlings	Decision (unanimous)	Invicta FC 4: Esparza vs. Hyatt	January 5, 2013	5	5:00	Kansas City, Kansas, United States	Won the inaugural Invicta FC Strawweight Championship.
Win	8–2	Lynn Alvarez	TKO (punches)	Invicta FC 3: Penne vs. Sugiyama	October 6, 2012	1	2:53	Kansas City, Kansas, United States	
Win	7–2	Sarah Schneider	TKO (punches)	Invicta FC 2: Baszler vs. McMann	July 28, 2012	2	4:28	Kansas City, Kansas, United States	
Win	6–2	Felice Herrig	Decision (unanimous)	XFC 15: Tribute	December 2, 2011	3	5:00	Tampa, Florida, United States	
Loss	5–2	Jessica Aguilar	Decision (split)	Bellator 46	June 25, 2011	3	5:00	Hollywood, Florida, United States	
Win	5–1	Yadira Anzaldua	Submission (rear-naked choke)	ECSC: Friday Night Fights 3	April 15, 2011	1	0:53	Clovis, New Mexico, United States	
Win	4–1	Nina Ansaroff	Decision (split)	Crowbar MMA: Winter Brawl	December 10, 2010	3	5:00	Grand Forks, North Dakota, United States	
Loss	3–1	Megumi Fujii	Submission (armbar)	Bellator 24	August 12, 2010	2	0:57	Hollywood, Florida, United States	Bellator Season 3 Women's Flyweight (115 lb) Tournament Quarterfinals.
Win	3–0	Lacey Schuckman	Submission (rear-naked choke)	NMEF Ladies Night: Clash of the Titans 8	July 16, 2010	2	2:37	Castle Rock, Colorado, United States	
Win	2–0	Karina Hallinan	Submission (rear-naked choke)	Long Beach Fight Night 8	April 18, 2010	2	2:16	Long Beach, California, United States	
Win	1–0	Cassie Trost	TKO (punches)	Respect in the Cage 3	February 19, 2010	1	0:48	Pomona, California, United States	

Exhibition record breakdown		
3 matches	3 wins	0 losses
By knockout	0	0
By submission	1	0
By decision	2	0

Res.	Record	Opponent	Method	Event	Date	Round	Time	Location	Notes
Win	3–0	Jessica Penne	Decision (unanimous)	The Ultimate Fighter: A Champion Will Be Crowned	December 10, 2014 (airdate)	3	5:00	Las Vegas, Nevada, United States	TUF 20 Semifinal round
Win	2–0	Tecia Torres	Decision (majority)	The Ultimate Fighter: A Champion Will Be Crowned	December 3, 2014 (airdate)	2	5:00	Las Vegas, Nevada, United States	TUF 20 Quarterfinal round
Win	1–0	Angela Hill	Submission (rear-naked choke)	The Ultimate Fighter: A Champion Will Be Crowned	October 1, 2014 (airdate)	1	3:42	Las Vegas, Nevada, United States	TUF 20 Elimination round

== See also ==
- List of female mixed martial artists

Awards and achievements
Preceded by Rose Namajunas	7th UFC Women's Strawweight Championship; May 7, 2022 – November 12, 2022	Succeeded by Zhang Weili
Preceded by New championship	1st UFC Women's Strawweight Championship; December 12, 2014 – March 14, 2015	Succeeded by Joanna Jędrzejczyk
Preceded by New championship	1st Invicta FC Strawweight Champion; January 5, 2013 – December 11, 2013	Succeeded by Katja Kankaanpää
