= UFC 275 =

Mixed martial arts event in 2022

UFC 275: Teixeira vs. Procházka
- The poster for UFC 275: Teixeira vs. Procházka
- Promotion: Ultimate Fighting Championship
- Date: June 12, 2022
- Venue: Singapore Indoor Stadium
- City: Kallang, Singapore
- Attendance: 10,787
- Total gate: $1,546,732

Event chronology
UFC Fight Night: Volkov vs. Rozenstruik	UFC 275: Teixeira vs. Procházka	UFC on ESPN: Kattar vs. Emmett

UFC 275: Teixeira vs. Procházka was a mixed martial arts event produced by the Ultimate Fighting Championship that took place on June 12, 2022, at the Singapore Indoor Stadium in Kallang, Singapore.

== Background ==
A UFC Light Heavyweight Championship bout between current champion Glover Teixeira and former Rizin Light Heavyweight Champion Jiří Procházka was originally expected to take place at UFC 274, but it was eventually moved to headline this event due to undisclosed reasons.

A UFC Women's Flyweight Championship bout between current champion Valentina Shevchenko and Taila Santos took place at the event.

A women's strawweight rematch between former UFC Women's Strawweight Champions Zhang Weili and Joanna Jędrzejczyk took place at the event. The pair previously met at UFC 248 where Zhang successfully defended the championship against Jędrzejczyk by split decision.

A welterweight bout between Orion Cosce and Mike Mathetha was expected to take place at UFC 271, but Cosce pulled out due to undisclosed reasons. They were then expected to meet at this event. Once again the bout was cancelled, as Mathetha got injured in late May.

A middleweight bout between former UFC Middleweight Champion Robert Whittaker (also The Ultimate Fighter: The Smashes welterweight winner) and former title challenger Marvin Vettori was expected to take place at the event. However, Whittaker withdrew due to an injury in April. The bout was then rescheduled for UFC Fight Night: Gane vs. Tuivasa.

Kang Kyung-ho and Saimon Oliveira were scheduled to meet in a bantamweight bout at this event. However, Oliveira withdrew for unknown reasons and was replaced by Danaa Batgerel.

A flyweight bout between former Rizin Bantamweight Champion Manel Kape and Rogério Bontorin was expected to take place at the event. However, the bout was scrapped the day before the event due to Bontorin suffering kidney issues related to cutting weight.

During fight week (June 9-10), the UFC hosted the opening quarterfinal round of Road to UFC Season 1 at the same venue, with two five-bout events for each day for a total of 10 bouts per day. The 32 contestants for the tournament come from China (through the UFC Academy), India, Indonesia, Japan, South Korea, the Philippines, and Thailand.

== Results ==
Main card
Weight class				Method	Round	Time	Notes
Light Heavyweight	Jiří Procházka	def.	Glover Teixeira (c)	Submission (rear-naked choke)	5	4:32	(Note: For the UFC Light Heavyweight Championship.)
Women's Flyweight	Valentina Shevchenko (c)	def.	Taila Santos	Decision (split) (48–47, 47–48, 49–46)	5	5:00	(Note: For the UFC Women's Flyweight Championship.)
Women's Strawweight	Zhang Weili	def.	Joanna Jędrzejczyk	KO (spinning backfist)	2	2:28
Welterweight	Jake Matthews	def.	André Fialho	KO (punches)	2	2:24
Welterweight	Jack Della Maddalena	def.	Ramazan Emeev	TKO (punches)	1	2:32
Preliminary card (ESPN / ESPN+)
Featherweight	Joshua Culibao	def.	Seung Woo Choi	Decision (split) (28–29, 29–28, 29–28)	3	5:00
Lightweight	Hayisaer Maheshate	def.	Steve Garcia	KO (punch)	1	1:14
Middleweight	Brendan Allen	def.	Jacob Malkoun	Decision (unanimous) (29–28, 29–28, 29–28)	3	5:00
Bantamweight	Kang Kyung-ho	def.	Danaa Batgerel	Decision (unanimous) (29–28, 29–28, 29–28)	3	5:00
Early preliminary card (ESPN+ / UFC Fight Pass)
Women's Strawweight	Silvana Gómez Juárez	def.	Na Liang	KO (punches)	1	1:22
Women's Featherweight	Joselyne Edwards	def.	Ramona Pascual	Decision (unanimous) (30–27, 29–28, 29–28)	3	5:00

== Bonus awards ==
The following fighters received $50,000 bonuses.

- Fight of the Night: Jiří Procházka vs. Glover Teixeira
- Performance of the Night: Zhang Weili, Jake Matthews, Jack Della Maddalena, Hayisaer Maheshate, and Silvana Gómez Juárez

The following fighters received Crypto.com "Fan Bonus of the Night" awards paid in bitcoin of US$30,000 for first place, US$20,000 for second place, and US$10,000 for third place.

- First Place: Valentina Shevchenko
- Second Place: Jiří Procházka
- Third Place: Zhang Weili

== See also ==
- List of UFC events
- List of current UFC fighters
- 2022 in UFC
