= Joanna Jędrzejczyk =

Polish mixed martial artist and kickboxer

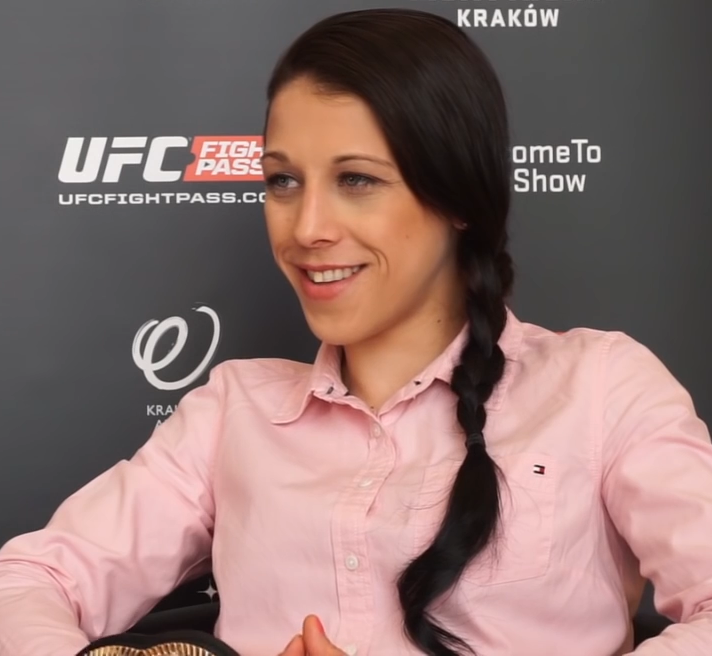
- Jędrzejczyk in 2015
- Born: Joanna Jędrzejczyk; August 18, 1987 (age 39); Olsztyn, Poland
- Height: 5 ft 6 in (168 cm)
- Weight: 115 lb (52 kg; 8 st 3 lb)
- Division: Kickboxing: Super bantamweight Featherweight; MMA: Strawweight (2014–2018, 2019–2022); Flyweight (2012–2014, 2018)
- Reach: 65 1/2 in (166 cm)
- Style: Muay Thai, Kickboxing
- Fighting out of: Olsztyn, Poland
- Team: Team Mr. Perfect (2008–2010); Berkut Arrachion Olsztyn (2012–2016); American Top Team (2016–2022)
- Rank: Blue belt in Brazilian jiu-jitsu under Artur Wasilevski
- Years active: 2012–2022

Kickboxing record
- Total: 30
- Wins: 27
- By knockout: 4
- Losses: 3

Mixed martial arts record
- Total: 21
- Wins: 16
- By knockout: 4
- By submission: 1
- By decision: 11
- Losses: 5
- By knockout: 2
- By decision: 3

Amateur Muay Thai record
- Total: 40
- Wins: 37
- Losses: 3

Other information
- Mixed martial arts record from Sherdog
- Last updated on: June 13, 2022

Joanna Jędrzejczyk (Polish: [jɔˈanna jɛndˈʐɛjtʂɨk], born August 18, 1987) is a Polish former professional mixed martial artist, Muay Thai fighter and kickboxer. Jędrzejczyk competed in the Ultimate Fighting Championship (UFC), where she holds several records and is a former UFC Women's Strawweight Champion, including most successful strawweight title defenses (5), most consecutive wins at strawweight (8), and is the first Polish champion and first female European champion. She has been called the greatest female strawweight mixed martial artist of all time, including by Daniel Cormier, who credited her with putting the weight class "on the map".

After discovering Muay Thai as a teenager, Jędrzejczyk went on to earn six medals (five gold) at the IFMA World Muaythai Championships and held several different championship titles with promotions such as World Kickboxing Network and World Muaythai Council. Switching to mixed martial arts (MMA) in May 2012, Jędrzejczyk went undefeated in her first nine fights and won the UFC Women's Strawweight Championship in March 2015 after defeating Carla Esparza at UFC 185. Over the next two years, she continued her undefeated streak with five successful title defenses against opponents such as Jessica Penne, Cláudia Gadelha, and Jéssica Andrade. Jędrzejczyk suffered the first loss of her MMA career when she lost the championship to Rose Namajunas in November 2017. After losing a rematch with Namajunas, Jędrzejczyk defeated Tecia Torres before briefly returning to flyweight in an unsuccessful attempt to capture the vacant UFC Women's Flyweight Championship against Valentina Shevchenko in December 2018. Following a strawweight win over Michelle Waterson-Gomez, Jędrzejczyk faced new strawweight champion Zhang Weili at UFC 248 in March 2020. Jędrzejczyk lost by split decision in what many pundits called the greatest fight in women's MMA history. Following a two-year layoff, Jędrzejczyk retired from mixed martial arts in June 2022 after losing a rematch against Zhang at UFC 275.

== Muay Thai and kickboxing ==
Jędrzejczyk discovered Muay Thai when she was 16, while taking up fitness, which eventually led her to compete in national and European tournaments. Jędrzejczyk competed in Muay Thai and kickboxing for 10 years, winning over 60 matches. Her amateur Muay Thai accomplishments include six IFMA world medals (five gold, one silver) and four IFMA European championships with a record of 37 wins and 3 losses. During her professional career Jędrzejczyk won five world titles including the WKN World Championship, J Girls Championship, WBKF Championship, WKF European Championship, and the WMC Championship. Her professional record is 27–3.

== Mixed martial arts ==
=== Early career ===
Jędrzejczyk made her professional debut in mixed martial arts (MMA) on May 19, 2012, at SFT - MMA Fight Night Diva SPA against Sylwia Juskiewicz, winning via unanimous decision. On December 8, 2012, at MFC 5 she defeated Lily Kazak by submission via rear naked choke. On June 20, 2013, at Battle of Moscow 12 she defeated the then #1 Russian WMMA flyweight fighter Julia Berezikova via unanimous decision.

By July 2013, Jędrzejczyk was the #7 women's flyweight fighter in the world by Fight Matrix.

On June 7, 2014, at Cage Warriors Fighting Championship 69 she defeated Rosi Sexton via knockout in the second round.

=== Ultimate Fighting Championship ===
Jędrzejczyk officially signed with the Ultimate Fighting Championship (UFC) in July 2014. She made her promotional debut, now fighting as a strawweight, on July 26, 2014, at UFC on Fox: Lawler vs. Brown against Juliana Lima. She won the fight via unanimous decision.

Jędrzejczyk next faced undefeated strawweight top contender Cláudia Gadelha on December 13, 2014, at UFC on Fox 13. She won the fight via split decision. The judges' decision was met with much controversy as the majority of the MMA media scored the bout in favor of Gadelha.

==== Strawweight Champion ====
Jędrzejczyk faced Carla Esparza for the UFC Strawweight Championship on March 14, 2015, at UFC 185. Jędrzejczyk won the one-sided bout via TKO in the second round, becoming the first UFC title-holder from Poland and first female European UFC champion. Subsequently, Jędrzejczyk won a Performance of the Night bonus.

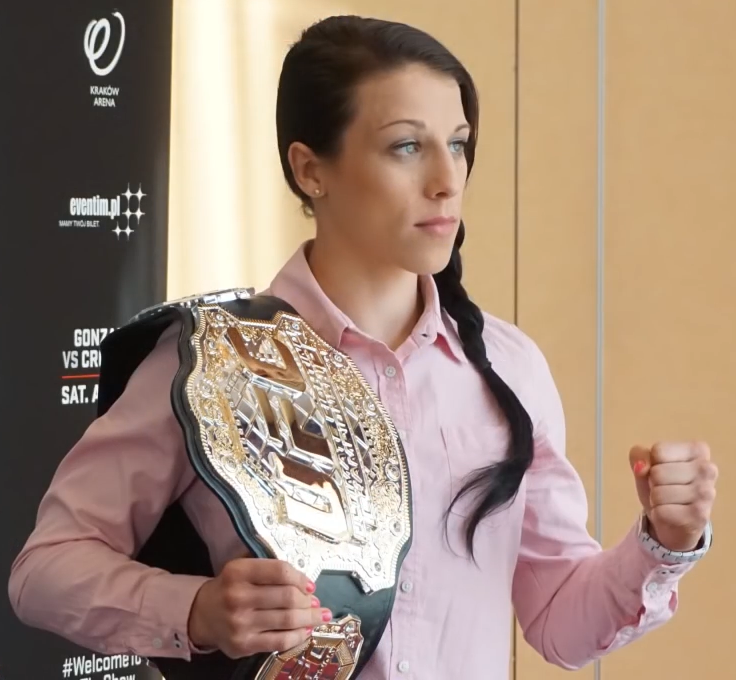
Jędrzejczyk posing with the UFC Women's Strawweight Championship Belt

Jędrzejczyk's first title defense was against Jessica Penne on June 20, 2015, at UFC Fight Night: Jędrzejczyk vs. Penne in Berlin, Germany. She successfully defended the title against Penne, defeating her in the third round via TKO following a flurry of punches and a knee against the cage. Both participants were awarded Fight of the Night honors. Jędrzejczyk later underwent surgery to repair a fractured thumb incurred during the fight.

In her second title defense, Jędrzejczyk faced Valérie Létourneau on November 15, 2015, in the co-main event at UFC 193. She won the fight by unanimous decision to retain her title. The 220 significant strikes landed by Jędrzejczyk were the most ever in a championship fight. 70 leg kicks were landed by Jędrzejczyk, the most in UFC history at the time. The previous record was 68, set by Carlos Condit against Nick Diaz at UFC 143.

In early 2016, the UFC announced that Jędrzejczyk would be one of the coaches, opposite former opponent Cláudia Gadelha on The Ultimate Fighter 23. A rematch between the two took place on July 8, 2016, at The Ultimate Fighter 23 Finale in the MGM Grand Garden Arena in Las Vegas, Nevada. She won the fight via unanimous decision. Both participants were awarded Fight of the Night for their performance.

Jędrzejczyk successfully defended her title for the 4th consecutive time by defeating fellow Pole Karolina Kowalkiewicz by unanimous decision on November 12, 2016, at UFC 205 in Madison Square Garden, the first event the promotion had held in the historic arena.

Jędrzejczyk faced Jéssica Andrade on May 13, 2017, at UFC 211. She won the fight via unanimous decision, and successfully defended her title for the fifth consecutive time. Jędrzejczyk landed the most significant strikes in UFC championship history (225), had the highest significant strike differential in UFC championship history (142), and broke her previous record for most leg kicks thrown in a single fight (75).

For her sixth title defense, Jędrzejczyk faced Rose Namajunas at UFC 217 at Madison Square Garden in New York on November 4, 2017. In a huge upset, she lost the bout via KO (punches) in the first round, marking her first professional loss in mixed martial arts competition.

==== Post-championship ====
A title fight rematch between Namajunas and Jędrzejczyk took place on April 7, 2018, at UFC 223. She lost the fight via unanimous decision.

Jędrzejczyk faced Tecia Torres on July 28, 2018, at UFC on Fox 30. She won the fight via unanimous decision.

==== Return to Flyweight ====
On September 20, 2018, it was announced that Jędrzejczyk was expected to return to flyweight to face Valentina Shevchenko on December 8, 2018, at UFC 231 for the vacant UFC Women's Flyweight Championship. Due to UFC 230 being in need of a main event, Shevchenko was booked against Sijara Eubanks. After the UFC announced Cormier vs. Lewis on October 9, 2018, UFC confirmed the bout between Shevchenko and Eubanks was canceled and that Jędrzejczyk would again fight for the title against Shevchenko in the co-main event at UFC 231. Jędrzejczyk lost the fight via a unanimous decision.

==== Return to Strawweight ====
Jędrzejczyk faced Michelle Waterson-Gomez on October 12, 2019, at UFC on ESPN+ 19. Per news reports, Jędrzejczyk had informed the UFC that she might not be able to make the Strawweight limit; however, she weighed in at 115.5 pounds. She won the fight via unanimous decision.

Jędrzejczyk faced Zhang Weili for UFC Women's Strawweight Championship on March 7, 2020, at UFC 248. She lost the fight via split decision. This fight earned her the Fight of the Night award, and was considered by many pundits as the greatest fight in women's MMA history.

A rematch between Jędrzejczyk and Zhang took place on June 11, 2022 at UFC 275. Jędrzejczyk lost the fight after getting knocked out with a spinning backfist in the second round. In her post-fight interview, Jędrzejczyk announced her retirement from mixed martial arts, saying, "It's been 20 years. I'm turning 35 this year. I want to be a mom. I want to be a businesswoman. I've been training two decades, more than half of my life. I appreciate you all. I love you guys."

==== Hall of Fame ====
It was announced on March 10, 2024 that Jędrzejczyk would be inducted into UFC Hall of Fame in July 2024.

During UFC 326's broadcast in March 2026, Jędrzejczyk's 2020 fight with Weili was announced as the next "fight wing" UFC Hall of Fame inductee during International Fight Week festivities in Las Vegas on July 9, 2026.

== Fighting style and coaches ==
A decorated kickboxer, Jędrzejczyk is known for precise and calculated striking. She employs a sprawl-and-brawl strategy in MMA fighting. While standing with opponents, she constantly varies between high punches and body shots, also utilizing knees, elbows, and high front kicks. She also uses a flurry of strikes just to confuse the opponent before landing a solid strike, much akin to Chuck Liddell. SportsJoe.ie MMA journalist Darragh Murphy summed up her fighting style: "Her technique has the right combination of sublimity and relentlessness, expressing one's typically violent art through beauty, the perfect storm."

Jędrzejczyk is soft-spoken and has a calm and endearing personality with fans. However, she often employs the use of trash-talk against her opponents before fights, and her fights have been known to be violent and bloody. UFC president Dana White has praised her stating "She is so bad ass... pound-for-pound [she is the] best female fighter on Earth... Her killer instinct is ridiculous." MMA media have called Jędrzejczyk "must-see TV".

Jędrzejczyk has been praised for her elite level sprawl-and-brawl strategy. Fightland striking analyst Jack Slack has written that "she's being likened to Chuck Liddell, and that is a pretty solid way to describe her...while she has an undoubtedly better technical striking game than Liddell". BloodyElbow.com striking analyst Connor Ruebusch has written "Distance, angles, and damage. These are the key ingredients of successful takedown defense, and the elements that make Joanna Jędrzejczyk and José Aldo such masterful strikers." The Washington Post striking analyst Patrick Wyman wrote that "sound fundamentals fuel the best fighters in the world, and nobody has better mastered the bread and butter of footwork and distance management than Aldo and Jedrzejczyk". Foxsports.com striking analyst Jason Parillo has stated that "Joanna's MMA boxing is remarkable. It's second to none".

Since her training camp for UFC 205, Jędrzejczyk has trained at American Top Team in Coconut Creek, Florida.

Her strength and conditioning coaches are Phil Daru and Jose Rojas. In 2021, Jędrzejczyk was promoted to blue belt in Brazilian jiu-jitsu after training in the gi.

== Personal life ==
Jędrzejczyk is Catholic and prays with a rosary before entering the ring or Octagon.

She was the fiancée of former Polish football player Przemysław Buta. In a 2019 interview, she cited "some difficulties" in her personal life for "almost two years", confirming that she is no longer engaged to Buta.

== Filmography ==
=== Film ===
Year	Title	Role	Notes	Ref.
2019	Kobiety mafii 2	Prisoner		
2021	Invincible	Herself	Documentary	

=== Television ===
Year	Title	Role	Notes	Ref.
2015	Szpital	Herself	TV series Season 5 Episode 399	
2026	Dancing with the Stars	Contestant	Season 32	

== Championships and accomplishments ==
=== Mixed martial arts ===
- Ultimate Fighting Championship
  - UFC Hall of Fame (Modern Wing, Class of 2024)
  - UFC Hall of Fame (Fight Wing, Class of 2026) vs. Zhang Weili 1 at UFC 248
  - UFC Women's Strawweight Championship (One time)
    - Five successful title defenses
    - Third most title fights in UFC Women's history (10)
    - Most title bouts in UFC Women's Strawweight history (9)
    - Tied (Zhang Weili) for most title fight wins in UFC Women's Strawweight history (6)
  - First Polish-born champion in UFC history
  - Performance of the Night (one time) vs. Carla Esparza
  - Fight of the Night (three times) vs. Jessica Penne, Cláudia Gadelha, and Zhang Weili 1
    - Tied (Carla Esparza & Zhang Weili) for fourth most Post-Fight bonuses in UFC Strawweight division history (4)
  - Tied (Carla Esparza, Jéssica Andrade, & Zhang Weili) for fourth most wins in UFC Women's Strawweight division history (10)
  - Longest win streak in UFC Women's Strawweight division history (8)
  - Tied (Carla Esparza) for most decision wins in UFC Women's Strawweight division history (8)
  - Second most significant strikes landed in UFC Women's Strawweight division history (1676)
  - Second most total strikes landed in UFC Women's Strawweight division history (1863)
  - Longest average fight time in UFC Women's Strawweight division history (18:09)
  - Second most total fight time in UFC Women's Strawweight division history (4:14:10)
  - Most significant strikes landed-per-minute in UFC Women's Strawweight division history (6:59)
  - Highest striking differential in UFC Women's Strawweight division history (3.37)
  - Second highest takedown defense percentage in UFC Women's Strawweight division history (89.3%)
  - Third highest significant strike differential in UFC championship history (+142 vs. Jéssica Andrade)
  - Tied (Joselyne Edwards) for most leg kicks in a fight in UFC history (+76 vs Michelle Waterson-Gomez)
    - Tied (Alexander Volkanovski) for third-most leg kicks in a fight in UFC history (+75 vs Jéssica Andrade)
  - First Polish UFC Champion
  - First female European UFC Champion
  - Third European UFC Champion
  - UFC Honors Awards
    - 2020: President's Choice Fight of the Year Winner vs. Zhang Weili 1
  - UFC.com Awards
    - 2014: Ranked #9 Newcomer of the Year
    - 2015: Half-Year Awards: Best Fighter of the 1HY & Ranked #3 Fighter of the Year
    - 2016: Ranked #5 Fighter of the Year & Ranked #6 Fight of the Year vs. Cláudia Gadelha 2
    - 2020: Fight of the Year vs. Zhang Weili 1
- Bloody Elbow
  - 2010s Women's Strawweight Fighter of the Decade
- Women's MMA Press Awards
  - 2014 Strawweight of the Year
- Yahoo! Sports
  - 2015 Best Fighter of the Half-Year
  - 2020 Fight of the Year vs. Zhang Weili at UFC 248
- Fight Matrix
  - 2015 Female Fighter of the Year
- MMA Junkie
  - 2015 Female Fighter of the Year
  - 2016 July Fight of the Month vs. Cláudia Gadelha
  - 2020 March Fight of the Month vs. Zhang Weili
  - 2020 Fight of the Year vs. Zhang Weili
- Fight Booth
  - 2015 Lady Violence Award
- Sherdog
  - 2015 All-Violence First Team
  - 2020 Fight of the Year vs. Zhang Weili
- World MMA Awards
  - 2019 – July 2020 Fight of the Year vs. Zhang Weili at UFC 248
- Wrestling Observer Newsletter
  - 2020 MMA Match of the Year vs. Zhang Weili
- MMA Fighting
  - 2020 Fight of the Year vs. Zhang Weili
- The Athletic
  - 2010s Women's Strawweight Fighter of the Decade
  - 2020 Fight of the Year vs. Zhang Weili
- ESPN
  - 2020 Fight of the Year vs. Zhang Weili at UFC 248
- Bleacher Report
  - 2015 Breakthrough Fighter of the Year
  - 2020 Fight of the Year vs. Zhang Weili
- Cageside Press
  - 2020 Fight of the Year vs. Zhang Weili
- BT Sport
  - 2020 Fight of the Year vs. Zhang Weili
- MMA Weekly
  - 2020 Fight of the Year vs. Zhang Weili
- Combat Press
  - 2016 Female Fighter of the Year
  - 2020 Fight of the Year vs. Zhang Weili
- CBS Sports
  - 2016 #7 Ranked UFC Fighter of the Year
  - 2016 #7 Ranked UFC Fight of the Year vs. Cláudia Gadelha
  - 2020 UFC Fight of the Year vs. Zhang Weili
- MMA Sucka
  - 2020 Fight of the Year vs. Zhang Weili at UFC 248

=== Kickboxing ===
- J-Girls Kickboxing Federation
  - 2009 J-Girls World Featherweight Champion
- World Budokai Federation
  - 2013 WBKF Pro Title
- World Kickboxing Federation
  - 2010 WKF European Champion

=== Muay Thai ===
- IFMA World Championships
  - 2013 Gold -57 kg
  - 2012 Gold -57 kg
  - 2011 Gold -57 kg
  - 2010 Gold -57 kg
  - 2009 Gold -57 kg
  - 2008 Silver -57 kg
- IFMA European Championships
  - 3x IFMA European Champion (2008, 2012)
- World Muaythai Council
  - WMC/EMF European Champion (one time)
- World Kickboxing Network
  - 2010 WKN Muay Thai World -57 kg Champion (one time)

== Mixed martial arts record ==
Professional record breakdown
21 matches	16 wins	5 losses
By knockout	4	2
By submission	1	0
By decision	11	3

Res.	Record	Opponent	Method	Event	Date	Round	Time	Location	Notes
Loss	16–5	Zhang Weili	KO (spinning backfist)	UFC 275	June 11, 2022	2	2:28	Kallang, Singapore	
Loss	16–4	Zhang Weili	Decision (split)	UFC 248	March 7, 2020	5	5:00	Las Vegas, Nevada, United States	For the UFC Women's Strawweight Championship. Fight of the Night.
Win	16–3	Michelle Waterson-Gomez	Decision (unanimous)	UFC Fight Night: Joanna vs. Waterson	October 12, 2019	5	5:00	Tampa, Florida, United States	
Loss	15–3	Valentina Shevchenko	Decision (unanimous)	UFC 231	December 8, 2018	5	5:00	Toronto, Ontario, Canada	For the vacant UFC Women's Flyweight Championship.
Win	15–2	Tecia Torres	Decision (unanimous)	UFC on Fox: Alvarez vs. Poirier 2	July 28, 2018	3	5:00	Calgary, Alberta, Canada	
Loss	14–2	Rose Namajunas	Decision (unanimous)	UFC 223	April 7, 2018	5	5:00	Brooklyn, New York, United States	For the UFC Women's Strawweight Championship.
Loss	14–1	Rose Namajunas	TKO (punches)	UFC 217	November 4, 2017	1	3:03	New York City, New York, United States	Lost the UFC Women's Strawweight Championship.
Win	14–0	Jéssica Andrade	Decision (unanimous)	UFC 211	May 13, 2017	5	5:00	Dallas, Texas, United States	Defended the UFC Women's Strawweight Championship.
Win	13–0	Karolina Kowalkiewicz	Decision (unanimous)	UFC 205	November 12, 2016	5	5:00	New York City, New York, United States	Defended the UFC Women's Strawweight Championship.
Win	12–0	Cláudia Gadelha	Decision (unanimous)	The Ultimate Fighter: Team Joanna vs. Team Cláudia Finale	July 8, 2016	5	5:00	Las Vegas, Nevada, United States	Defended the UFC Women's Strawweight Championship. Fight of the Night.
Win	11–0	Valérie Létourneau	Decision (unanimous)	UFC 193	November 15, 2015	5	5:00	Melbourne, Australia	Defended the UFC Women's Strawweight Championship.
Win	10–0	Jessica Penne	TKO (punches and knee)	UFC Fight Night: Jędrzejczyk vs. Penne	June 20, 2015	3	4:22	Berlin, Germany	Defended the UFC Women's Strawweight Championship. Fight of the Night.
Win	9–0	Carla Esparza	KO (punches)	UFC 185	March 14, 2015	2	4:17	Dallas, Texas, United States	Won the UFC Women's Strawweight Championship. Performance of the Night.
Win	8–0	Cláudia Gadelha	Decision (split)	UFC on Fox: dos Santos vs. Miocic	December 13, 2014	3	5:00	Phoenix, Arizona, United States	
Win	7–0	Juliana Lima	Decision (unanimous)	UFC on Fox: Lawler vs. Brown	July 26, 2014	3	5:00	San Jose, California, United States	Strawweight debut; Lima missed weight (116.5 lb).
Win	6–0	Rosi Sexton	KO (punch)	Cage Warriors 69	June 7, 2014	2	2:36	London, England	
Win	5–0	Karla Benitez	Decision (unanimous)	Warriors Arena MMA 1	May 9, 2014	3	5:00	Warsaw, Poland	
Win	4–0	Julia Berezikova	Decision (unanimous)	Fight Nights: Battle of Moscow 12	June 20, 2013	2	5:00	Moscow, Russia	
Win	3–0	Kate Jackson	TKO (doctor stoppage)	PLMMA 17	May 18, 2013	2	5:00	Olsztyn, Poland	
Win	2–0	Lily Kazak	Submission (rear-naked choke)	Makowski FC 5	December 8, 2012	1	3:22	Nowa Sol, Poland	Flyweight debut.
Win	1–0	Sylwia Juśkiewicz	Decision (unanimous)	Szczerek Fight Team: MMA Fight Night 1	May 19, 2012	2	5:00	Kolobrzeg, Poland	Catchweight (121 lb) bout.

Amateur record breakdown		
2 matches	2 wins	0 losses
By submission	1	0
By decision	1	0

Res.	Record	Opponent	Method	Event	Date	Round	Time	Location	Notes
Win	2–0	Karolina Kowalkiewicz	Submission (rear-naked choke)	Amatorska Liga MMA 18	March 4, 2012	1	4:18	Sochaczew, Poland	
Win	1–0	Paulina Suska	Decision (unanimous)	Amatorska Liga MMA 18	March 4, 2012	1	5:00	Sochaczew, Poland	

== Pay-per-view bouts ==
No.	Event	Fight	Date	Venue	City	PPV Buys
1.	UFC 185	Esparza vs. Jędrzejczyk (co)	March 14, 2015	American Airlines Center	Dallas, Texas, U.S.	310,000
2.	UFC 193	Jędrzejczyk vs. Létourneau (co)	November 15, 2015	Etihad Stadium	Melbourne, Victoria, Australia	1,100,000
3.	UFC 211	Jędrzejczyk vs. Andrade (co)	May 13, 2017	American Airlines Center	Dallas, Texas, U.S.	300,000
4.	UFC 223	Namajunas vs. Joanna 2 (co)	April 7, 2018	Barclays Center	Brooklyn, New York, U.S.	350,000
5.	UFC 231	Shevchenko vs. Joanna (co)	December 8, 2018	Scotiabank Arena	Toronto, Ontario, Canada	300,000
6.	UFC 248	Zhang vs. Joanna (co)	March 7, 2020	T-Mobile Arena	Las Vegas, Nevada, U.S.	Not Disclosed
Total sales						2,360,000

== Muay Thai & Kickboxing record (incomplete) ==
Professional Muay Thai & Kickboxing Record
27 Wins (6 (T)KO, 21 decisions), 3 Loss, 1 Draw
Date	Result	Opponent	Event	Location	Method	Round	Time
2013-11-07	Loss	(Thailand) Duannapa Mor Rattanapundit	Muay Thai Angels	Bangkok, Thailand	Decision	3	3:00
2013-10-02	Win	(France) Sandra Sevilla	Muay Thai Angels	Bangkok, Thailand	Decision	3	3:00
2013-09-07	Win	(Germany) Lisa Schewe		Germany	Decision	3	3:00
2012-11-23	Win	(Japan) Ayano Oishi	Hoost Cup Spirit 2	Nagoya, Japan	Ext.R Decision (Unanimous)	4	3:00
2011-11-26	Loss	(Belarus) Ekaterina Vandaryeva	Big-8 WKN World Grand Prix	Minsk, Belarus	Decision	5	3:00
Fought for WKN World Title
2011-05-11	Win	(Poland) Marta Chojnoska	Iron Fist 4	Szczecin, Poland	Decision	5	3:00
2010-09-12	Win	(Belarus) Alla Ivashkevich	WKN Belarus Big 8 Tournament	Minsk, Belarus	Decision	5	3:00
Wins WKN Muay Thai World -57kg Title
2010-06-19	Loss	(Scotland) Amanda Kelly	Lady Killers 4	Manchester, England	Decision	5	3:00
2010-04-11	Win	(Netherlands) Mariela Kruse		Netherlands	Points	3	3:00
2009-12-20	Win	(Japan) Satoko Sasaki	J-GIRLS Final Stage 2009	Tokyo, Japan	Decision (Unanimous)	3	3:00
Wins inaugural J-Girls World Featherweight Title
2009-08-29	Win	(Suriname) Titiana van Polanen	Fighting with the Stars	Paramaribo, Suriname	Decision	3	3:00
2008-12-21	Win	(Netherlands) Aleide Lawant		Amsterdam, Netherlands	Decision	3	3:00
Legend: Win Loss Draw/No contest Notes

Amateur Muay Thai record
37 Wins (3 (T)KOs), 3 Losses,
Date	Result	Opponent	Event	Location	Method	Round	Time
2012-09-12	Win	(France) Katia Semail	I.F.M.A. World Championship Tournament 2012, Finals -57 kg	Saint Petersburg, Russia	Decision	4	2:00
Wins the I.F.M.A. World Championship Tournament Gold Medal -57 kg.
2012-09-11	Win	(Sweden) Emma Thyni	I.F.M.A. World Championship Tournament 2012, Semi-finals -57 kg	Saint Petersburg, Russia	N/A	N/A	N/A
2012-09-10	Win	(New Zealand) Janna Vaughan	I.F.M.A. World Championship Tournament 2012, Quarter Finals -57 kg	Saint Petersburg, Russia	N/A	N/A	N/A
2012-09-08	Win	(Ukraine) Diana Jakovleva	I.F.M.A. World Championship Tournament 2012, First Round -57 kg	Saint Petersburg, Russia	N/A	N/A	N/A
2012-05-?	Win	(Ukraine) Diana Jakovleva	E.M.F. European Championship Tournament 2012, Finals -60 kg	Antalya, Turkey	Decision	4	2:00
Wins the E.M.F. European Championship Tournament Gold Medal -60 kg.
2011-09-26	Win	(Sweden) Maria Olsson	I.F.M.A. World Championship Tournament 2011, Finals -57 kg	Tashkent, Uzbekistan	Decision	4	2:00
Wins the I.F.M.A. World Championship Tournament Gold Medal -57 kg.
2011-09-24	Win	(Belarus) Ekatarina Vandaryeva	I.F.M.A. World Championship Tournament 2011, Semi-finals -57 kg	Tashkent, Uzbekistan	Decision	4	2:00
2011-09-23	Win	(Ukraine) Diana Jakovleva	I.F.M.A. World Championship Tournament 2011, Quarter Finals -57 kg	Tashkent, Uzbekistan	Decision	4	2:00
2009-12-?	Win	(United Kingdom) Anna Zucchelli	I.F.M.A. World Championship Tournament 2009, Finals -57 kg	Bangkok, Thailand	N/A	N/A	N/A
Wins the I.F.M.A. World Championship Tournament Gold Medal -57 kg.
2008-09-?	Loss	(Kyrgyzstan) Valentina Shevchenko	I.F.M.A. World Championship Tournament 2008, Finals -57 kg	Busan, South Korea	Decision	3	3:00
Wins the I.F.M.A. World Championship Tournament Silver Medal -57 kg.
2007-11-29	Loss	(Kyrgyzstan) Valentina Shevchenko	I.F.M.A. World Championship Tournament 2007, Quarter Finals -57 kg	Bangkok, Thailand	Decision	4	2:00
2006-05-31	Loss	(Kyrgyzstan) Valentina Shevchenko	I.F.M.A. World Championship Tournament 2006, Quarter Finals -57 kg	Bangkok, Thailand	Decision	3	3:00
Legend: Win Loss Draw/No contest Notes

== See also ==
- List of female mixed martial artists
- List of multi-sport athletes
- List of multi-sport champions
- List of UFC champions

Awards and achievements
Preceded by Carla Esparza	2nd UFC Women's Strawweight Champion; March 14, 2015 – November 4, 2017	Succeeded by Rose Namajunas
