= UFC 248 =

UFC mixed martial arts event in 2020

UFC 248: Adesanya vs. Romero
- The poster for UFC 248: Adesanya vs. Romero
- Promotion: Ultimate Fighting Championship
- Date: March 7, 2020
- Venue: T-Mobile Arena
- City: Paradise, Nevada, United States
- Attendance: 15,077
- Total gate: $2,742,906.20

Event chronology
UFC Fight Night: Benavidez vs. Figueiredo	UFC 248: Adesanya vs. Romero	UFC Fight Night: Lee vs. Oliveira

UFC 248: Adesanya vs. Romero was a mixed martial arts event produced by the Ultimate Fighting Championship that took place on March 7, 2020, at the T-Mobile Arena in Paradise, Nevada, part of the Las Vegas Metropolitan Area, United States.

== Background ==
A UFC Middleweight Championship bout between the current champion Israel Adesanya and former interim title challenger (as well as 2000 Olympic silver medalist and former world champion in freestyle wrestling) Yoel Romero headlined the event.

A UFC Women's Strawweight Championship bout between the current champion Zhang Weili and former champion Joanna Jędrzejczyk took place as the co-main event.

A middleweight bout between former champion Robert Whittaker (also The Ultimate Fighter: The Smashes welterweight winner) and Jared Cannonier was expected to take place at this event. However, it was announced on January 15 that Whittaker pulled out of the bout. Subsequently, promotion officials announced that Cannonier would be on standby in the event that one of the main event participants were to pull out of that contest. In turn, Cannonier indicated in mid-February that he had suffered a torn pectoral injury while training and would be sidelined for several months.

A bantamweight bout between Sean O'Malley and The Ultimate Fighter: Latin America bantamweight winner José Alberto Quiñónez was originally scheduled to take place at UFC 229. However, it was scrapped after O'Malley failed a United States Anti-Doping Agency (USADA) drug test. The bout was then expected to take place at UFC 247, but it was eventually moved to this event for unknown reasons.

While not officially announced by the organization, a featherweight bout between Calvin Kattar and Jeremy Stephens was expected to take place at the event. However, Stephens was removed from the card in mid-January with an injury. The pairing was left intact and rescheduled for UFC 249.

A featherweight bout between Douglas Silva de Andrade and Movsar Evloev was scheduled to take place at the event. However, de Andrade withdrew from the bout due to injury and was replaced by promotional newcomer Jamall Emmers. Subsequently, Evloev pulled out of the fight in late February citing injuries sustained in a road accident. He was replaced by Giga Chikadze.

A middleweight bout between Derek Brunson and Edmen Shahbazyan was scheduled to take place at the event. However, it was announced on February 20 that the bout had moved to UFC Fight Night: Overeem vs. Harris.

At the weigh-ins, Emily Whitmire weighed in at 117.5 pounds, 1.5 pounds over the strawweight non-title fight limit of 116 pounds. She was fined 20% of her purse and her bout with Polyana Viana was expected to proceed as scheduled at a catchweight. However, Whitmire was hospitalized the day of the event and the fight was cancelled.

== Results ==
Main Card
Weight class				Method	Round	Time	Notes
Middleweight	Israel Adesanya (c)	def.	Yoel Romero	Decision (unanimous) (48–47, 48–47, 49–46)	5	5:00	(Note: For the UFC Middleweight Championship.)
Women's Strawweight	Zhang Weili (c)	def.	Joanna Jędrzejczyk	Decision (split) (48–47, 47–48, 48–47)	5	5:00	(Note: For the UFC Women's Strawweight Championship.)
Lightweight	Beneil Dariush	def.	Drakkar Klose	KO (punch)	2	1:00
Welterweight	Neil Magny	def.	Li Jingliang	Decision (unanimous) (30–27, 30–27, 30–27)	3	5:00
Welterweight	Alex Oliveira	def.	Max Griffin	Decision (split) (28–29, 29–28, 29–28)	3	5:00
Preliminary Card (ESPN)
Bantamweight	Sean O'Malley	def.	José Alberto Quiñónez	TKO (head kick and punches)	1	2:02
Lightweight	Mark Madsen	def.	Austin Hubbard	Decision (unanimous) (29–28, 29–28, 29–28)	3	5:00
Middleweight	Rodolfo Vieira	def.	Saparbek Safarov	Submission (arm-triangle choke)	1	2:58
Middleweight	Gerald Meerschaert	def.	Deron Winn	Submission (rear-naked choke)	3	2:13
Early Preliminary Card (ESPN+)
Featherweight	Giga Chikadze	def.	Jamall Emmers	Decision (split) (29–28, 28–29, 29–28)	3	5:00
Bantamweight	Danaa Batgerel	def.	Guido Cannetti	KO (punches)	1	3:01

== Bonus awards ==
The following fighters received $50,000 bonuses.

- Fight of the Night: Zhang Weili vs. Joanna Jędrzejczyk
- Performance of the Night: Beneil Dariush and Sean O'Malley

== Reported payout ==
The following is the reported payout to the fighters as reported to the Nevada State Athletic Commission (NSAC). It does not include sponsor money and also does not include the UFC's traditional "fight night" bonuses. The total disclosed payout for the event was $2,086,000.

- Israel Adesanya: $500,000 (no win bonus) def. Yoel Romero: $350,000
- Zhang Weili: $200,000 (includes $100,000 win bonus) def. Joanna Jędrzejczyk: $106,000
- Beneil Dariush: $140,000 (includes $70,000 win bonus) def. Drakkar Klose: $40,000
- Neil Magny: $152,000 (includes $76,000 win bonus) def. Li Jingliang: $64,000
- Alex Oliviera: $128,000 (includes $64,000 win bonus) def. Max Griffin: $35,000
- Sean O'Malley: $70,000 (includes $35,000 win bonus) def. José Alberto Quiñónez: $33,000
- Mark Madsen: $66,000 (includes $33,000 win bonus) def. Austin Hubbard: $12,000
- Rodolfo Vieira: $28,000 (includes $14,000 win bonus) def. Saparbek Safarov: $22,000
- Gerald Meerschaert: $60,000 (includes $30,000 win bonus) def. Deron Winn: $12,000
- Giga Chikadze: $24,000 (includes $12,000 win bonus) def. Jamall Emmers: $10,000
- Danaa Batgerel: $20,000 (includes $10,000 win bonus) def. Guido Cannetti: $14,000

== Aftermath ==
On September 3, it was announced that the Nevada State Athletic Commission (NAC) suspended Deron Winn for nine months and fined him fined $1,800 after he tested positive for amphetamines in relation to this event. The suspension is retroactive to the date of the positive test.

== See also ==
- List of UFC events
- List of current UFC fighters
- 2020 in UFC
