= Viviane Pereira =

Brazilian mixed martial artist

- Born: August 28, 1993 (age 33); Tauá, Ceará, Brazil
- Other names: Sucuri
- Height: 5 ft 0 in (1.52 m)
- Weight: 52 kg (115 lb; 8 st 3 lb)
- Division: Strawweight
- Reach: 64 in (163 cm)
- Style: Boxing, Wrestling, BJJ
- Fighting out of: Fortaleza, Ceará, Brazil
- Team: Dragon Kombat (until 2020); Astra Fight Team (2021–present)
- Years active: 2013–present

Mixed martial arts record
- Total: 20
- Wins: 16
- By knockout: 4
- By submission: 3
- By decision: 9
- Losses: 4
- By decision: 4

Other information
- Mixed martial arts record from Sherdog

Viviane "Sucuri' Pereira (born August 8, 1993) is a Brazilian mixed martial artist and competes in strawweight division. She last competed for Invicta Fighting Championships. A professional mixed martial artist since 2013, Pereira has also fought in the UFC.

== Background ==
Pereira started MMA training in a social project and decided to pursue a career as a fighter, after her first win.

Pereira was kicked off her team after informing her coach that she was pregnant with his child, which she gave birth to in December 2020. The father of the child, Marcos Batista, who runs the Dragon Kombat team in Fortaleza, blocked her from all means of communication and kicked her out of the gym she trained at, while continuing to avoid judicial intimations by not showing up to court. Pereira had been dating Marcos since she was 15, after beginning to train with him around the age of 12.

== Mixed martial arts career ==
=== Early career ===
Pereira started her professional MMA career in 2013, where she took fights in her native Brazil, notably for Xtreme Fighting Championships, ASPERA Fighting Championship, Bitetti Combat and LIMO Fight Combat. She amassed a record of 11-0 prior to being signed by UFC.

=== Ultimate Fighting Championship ===
Pereira made her promotional debut on December 10, 2016, at UFC 206 against Valérie Létourneau in Toronto, Canada. She scored more points than Létourneau and earned her first UFC win via split decision.

On June 3, 2017, Pereira faced Jamie Moyle at UFC 212. After three rounds, the judges award the win to Pereira via unanimous decision.

Pereira faced Tatiana Suarez on November 11, 2017, at UFC Fight Night: Poirier vs. Pettis. She lost the fight via unanimous decision, the first loss of her MMA career.

Pereira faced Yan Xiaonan, replacing injured Nadia Kassem on June 23, 2018, at UFC Fight Night 132. She lost the fight via unanimous decision and was subsequently released from the promotion.

=== Invicta FC ===
On August 9, 2018, Pereira announced that she had signed a multi-fight contract with Invicta Fighting Championships.

On October 9, 2018, it was announced that Pereira replaced Heather Jo Clark on short notice to face Mizuki Inoue at Invicta FC 32: Spencer vs. Sorenson on November 16, 2018. At the weigh-ins, Inoue weighed in at 116.4 pounds, 0.4 pound over the strawweight non-title fight limit of 126. She fined 25 percent of her purse, which went to her opponents Pereira and the fight proceeded to a catchweight bout. Pereira lost the fight via unanimous decision.

Pereira then moved down to atomweight division, facing Alesha Zappitella at Invicta FC 35: Bennett vs. Rodriguez II on June 7, 2019. However, Pereira missed weight by 0.7 pounds and was fined 25 percent of her fight purse. Pereira won the fight via unanimous decision.

=== Global Fight League ===
On December 14, 2024, it was reported that Pereira had signed with Global Fight League.

Pereira was scheduled to face former Bellator Women's Flyweight Champion Ilima-Lei Macfarlane on May 25, 2025, at GFL 2. However, all GFL events were cancelled indefinitely.

== Championships and accomplishments ==
=== Mixed martial arts ===
- Xtreme Fighting Championships
  - Xtreme Fighting Championships International Strawweight Champion (One time) vs. Vanessa Guimaraes
- ASPERA Fighting Championship
  - ASPERA Fighting Championship Strawweight Champion (One time) vs. Carolina Karasek
- LIMO Fight
  - LIMO Fight Strawweight Champion (One time) vs. Gina Brito Silva Santana
- BITETI COMBAT
  - BITETI Combat Strawweight Champion (One time) vs. Poliana Botelho

== Mixed martial arts record ==
Professional record breakdown
| 20 matches | 16 wins | 4 losses |
| By knockout | 4 | 0 |
| By submission | 3 | 0 |
| By decision | 9 | 4 |

| Res. | Record | Opponent | Method | Event | Date | Round | Time | Location | Notes |
|---|---|---|---|---|---|---|---|---|---|
| Loss | 16–5 | Aitana Álvarez | Decision (unanimous) | Superior Challenge 29 | November 29, 2025 | 3 | 5:00 | Stockholm, Sweden | Return to Bantamweight. For the SC Women's Bantamweight Championship. |
| Loss | 16–4 | Rayla Nascimento | Decision (unanimous) | XFC 51 | September 27, 2024 | 3 | 5:00 | Milwaukee, Wisconsin, United States | |
| Win | 16–3 | DeAnna Bennett | Submission (guillotine choke) | XFC: Detroit Grand Prix 2 | May 31, 2024 | 1 | 1:50 | Detroit, Michigan, United States | |
| Win | 15–3 | Rayla Nascimento | Decision (unanimous) | Standout Fighting Tournament 43 | October 21, 2023 | 3 | 5:00 | São Paulo, Brazil | Return to Flyweight. |
| Win | 14–3 | Alesha Zappitella | Decision (unanimous) | Invicta FC 35: Bennett vs. Rodriguez II | June 7, 2019 | 3 | 5:00 | Kansas City, Kansas, United States | Atomweight debut; Pereira missed weight (106.7 lb). |
| Loss | 13–3 | Mizuki Inoue | Decision (unanimous) | Invicta FC 32: Spencer vs. Sorenson | November 16, 2018 | 3 | 5:00 | Shawnee, Oklahoma, United States | Catchweight (116.4 lb) bout; Inoue missed weight. |
| Loss | 13–2 | Yan Xiaonan | Decision (unanimous) | UFC Fight Night: Cowboy vs. Edwards | June 23, 2018 | 3 | 5:00 | Kallang, Singapore | |
| Loss | 13–1 | Tatiana Suarez | Decision (unanimous) | UFC Fight Night: Poirier vs. Pettis | November 11, 2017 | 3 | 5:00 | Norfolk, Virginia, United States | |
| Win | 13–0 | Jamie Moyle | Decision (unanimous) | UFC 212 | June 3, 2017 | 3 | 5:00 | Rio de Janeiro, Brazil | |
| Win | 12–0 | Valérie Létourneau | Decision (split) | UFC 206 | December 10, 2016 | 3 | 5:00 | Toronto, Ontario, Canada | Catchweight (117.5 lbs) bout; Létourneau missed weight. |
| Win | 11–0 | Carolina Karasek | Decision (unanimous) | Aspera FC 42 | August 6, 2016 | 3 | 5:00 | São Paulo, Brazil | |
| Win | 10–0 | Vanessa Guimarães | Submission (armbar) | XFC International 12 | November 28, 2015 | 3 | 4:08 | São Paulo, Brazil | Won the vacant XFC Strawweight Championship. |
| Win | 9–0 | Vuokko Katainen | Decision (unanimous) | XFC International 10 | July 4, 2015 | 3 | 5:00 | São Paulo, Brazil | Won the XFC Strawweight Tournament. |
| Win | 8–0 | Liana Ferreira Pirosin | Decision (unanimous) | XFC International 9 | March 15, 2015 | 3 | 5:00 | São Paulo, Brazil | XFC Strawweight Tournament Semifinal. |
| Win | 7–0 | Fernanda Priscila Barros Pinheiro | TKO (punches) | XFC International 7 | November 1, 2014 | 1 | 3:22 | São Paulo, Brazil | XFC Strawweight Tournament Quarterfinal. |
| Win | 6–0 | Gina Brito Silva Santana | Submission (armbar) | Limo Fight 13 | August 15, 2014 | 1 | N/A | Limoeiro do Norte, Brazil | Strawweight debut. |
| Win | 5–0 | Poliana Botelho | Decision (unanimous) | Bitetti Combat 20 | June 7, 2014 | 3 | 5:00 | Rio de Janeiro, Brazil | Won the vacant Bitetti Combat Flyweight Championship. |
| Win | 4–0 | Nicleide Machado | TKO (punches) | Bitetti Combat 19 | February 6, 2014 | 1 | N/A | Manaus, Brazil | Bantamweight bout. |
| Win | 3–0 | Duda Yankovich | TKO (punches) | Bitetti Combat 18 | October 31, 2013 | 2 | 2:49 | Rio de Janeiro, Brazil | Flyweight debut. |
| Win | 2–0 | Ilara Joanne | TKO (punches) | Ox MMA | August 8, 2013 | 2 | 2:39 | Fortaleza, Brazil | |
| Win | 1–0 | Rosy Duarte | Decision (split) | Sobral Extreme Fight 6 | May 27, 2013 | 3 | 5:00 | Sobral, Brazil | Bantamweight debut. |

== See also ==
- List of female mixed martial artists
