= Bobby Nash =

American mixed martial artist (born 1990)

- Born: Robert Nash; March 26, 1990 (age 36); Clawson, Michigan, U.S.
- Other names: Nashty
- Height: 6 ft 0 in (1.83 m)
- Weight: 170.5 lb (77.3 kg; 12.18 st)
- Division: Middleweight; Welterweight
- Reach: 74.0
- Fighting out of: St. Clair Shores, Michigan, U.S.
- Team: Fuse MMA (formerly); Michigan Top Team (2018–present)
- Teachers: Don Richard; Ben Lagman; Joe Battaglia
- Rank: Blue belt in Brazilian Jiu-Jitsu
- Wrestling: NCAA Division I Wrestling
- Years active: 2010–2023

Mixed martial arts record
- Total: 17
- Wins: 12
- By knockout: 7
- By submission: 4
- By decision: 1
- Losses: 5
- By knockout: 4
- By decision: 1

Other information
- University: Lindsey Wilson College; Michigan State University
- Mixed martial arts record from Sherdog

Robert Nash (born March 26, 1990) is an American former mixed martial artist who competed in the Welterweight division. A professional competitor since 2010, he has formerly competed for the UFC, Bellator MMA, and RFA.

== Background ==
Born and raised in Roseville, Michigan, Nash started wrestling at the age of five. He attended Roseville High School where he competed in wrestling and football. During his senior season, Nash compiled a record of 62-1, capturing the state title at 152 lbs. and also had a third-place finish at 140 lbs. during his junior season. After graduating, Nash entertained offers from Division 1 wrestling colleges and chose Lindsey Wilson College where he wrestled for one year with scholarship. Wanting to wrestle in the Big Ten Conference, he transferred to Michigan State University to continue wrestling for the Spartans. After graduating and earning his degree in sociology, he began training for MMA.

== Mixed martial arts career ==
=== Early career ===
Nash held an amateur record of 13–0 and was the WXC Amateur Welterweight Champion before making his professional debut in 2010. He compiled a record of 8–1 before being signed by the UFC.

=== Ultimate Fighting Championship ===
Nash made his UFC debut against Li Jingliang at UFC on Fox 23 on January 28, 2017. He lost via KO in the second round.

In his second fight for the promotion, Nash faced Danny Roberts on July 16, 2017 at UFC Fight Night: Nelson vs. Ponzinibbio. He lost the fight via knockout in the second round.

Nash faced Song Kenan on November 25, 2017 at UFC Fight Night: Silva vs. Gastelum. He lost the fight via TKO in the first round.

=== XFC ===
Nash made his promotional debut for XFC against Spencer Jebb at XFC 43 on November 11, 2020. He won the bout via TKO in the first round.

==== XFC Welterweight Tournament ====
In the semi-finals of the XFC Welterweight Tournament, Nash faced Ryan Dickson at XFC 44 on May 28, 2021. He won the bout via KO in the first round and advanced to the final.

Nash was scheduled to face LaRue Burley on August 6, 2021 at XFC 45 for the XFC welterweight tournament finals. However, roughly two weeks before XFC 45, Burley broke his hand during his last round of hard sparring, there being replaced by Quinton Parks Jr. on short notice in a bout that will not be part of the welterweight tournament. He won the bout via rear naked choke in the first round.

=== Bellator MMA ===
On October 18, 2022, it was announced that Nash had signed a multi-fight contract with Bellator MMA.

Nash was scheduled to make his promotional debut against Roman Faraldo on June 16, 2023 at Bellator 297. In the beginning of May, it was announced that Faraldo had pulled out of the bout and replaced by Kyle Crutchmer. Nash lost the bout in the first round, getting dropped with a punch and finished via ground and pound.

== Personal life ==
Nash has four siblings: three brothers and a sister. Two of his brothers, Chris and Kevin, also wrestled for Michigan State.

Nash has a son, Zander (born 2018) with wife Jessica Nash (m.2020).

== Mixed martial arts record ==
Professional record breakdown
17 matches	12 wins	5 losses
By knockout	7	4
By submission	4	0
By decision	1	1

Res.	Record	Opponent	Method	Event	Date	Round	Time	Location	Notes
Loss	12–5	Kyle Crutchmer	TKO (punches)	Bellator 297	June 16, 2023	1	3:42	Chicago, Illinois, United States	
Win	12–4	Quinton Parks Jr.	Submission (rear-naked choke)	XFC 45	August 6, 2021	1	2:08	Grand Rapids, Michigan, United States	
Win	11–4	Ryan Dickson	TKO (punches)	XFC 44	May 28, 2021	1	3:00	Des Moines, Iowa, United States	XFC Welterweight Tournament Semi Final
Win	10–4	Spencer Jebb	TKO (punches)	XFC 43	November 11, 2020	1	3:36	Atlanta, Georgia, United States	XFC Welterweight Tournament Quarter Final
Win	9–4	Mark Stoddard	TKO (punches)	WXC 78	May 29, 2019	2	1:03	Southgate, Michigan, United States	
Loss	8–4	Song Kenan	TKO (punches)	UFC Fight Night: Bisping vs. Gastelum	November 25, 2017	1	0:15	Shanghai, China	
Loss	8–3	Danny Roberts	KO (punches)	UFC Fight Night: Nelson vs. Ponzinibbio	July 16, 2017	2	3:59	Glasgow, Scotland	
Loss	8–2	Li Jingliang	KO (punches)	UFC on Fox: Shevchenko vs. Peña	January 28, 2017	2	4:45	Denver, Colorado, United States	
Win	8–1	Lewis Gonzalez	TKO (punches)	Global Knockout 7	August 27, 2016	2	0:18	Jackson, California, United States	
Win	7–1	Deray Davis	TKO (punches)	RFA 39: Barcelos vs. Moffett	June 17, 2016	1	0:40	Hammond, Indiana, United States	
Win	6–1	Angelo Trevino	Submission (guillotine)	Global Knockout 6	March 26, 2016	2	3:09	Jackson, California, United States	
Win	5–1	Craig Fruth	KO (punch)	HFC 26	November 14, 2015	1	1:44	Michigan City, Indiana, United States	
Win	4–1	Leonard Simpson	TKO (punches)	Triple X Legends 6	September 12, 2015	2	0:21	Novi, Michigan, United States	Returned to Welterweight.
Win	3–1	Rocky Edwards	Decision (unanimous)	FCOC IV	May 8, 2015	3	5:00	Jacksonville, North Carolina, United States	Middleweight debut.
loss	2–1	Tenyeh Dixon	Decision (unanimous)	WXC 55	October 17, 2015	3	5:00	Southgate, Michigan, United States	
Win	2–0	Marcus Ayub	Submission (guillotine choke)	Triple A MMA 10	November 8, 2014	1	2:22	Albuquerque, New Mexico, United States	
Win	1–0	Jay Jackson	Submission (rear-naked choke)	WXC 52	August 15, 2014	1	4:12	Southgate, Michigan, United States	

== See also ==
- List of male mixed martial artists
