= Luís Santos (fighter) =

Brazilian mixed martial arts fighter

- Born: 2 January 1980 (age 46); Belém, Pará, Brazil
- Other names: Sapo
- Height: 6 ft 1 in (1.85 m)
- Weight: 185 lb (84 kg; 13.2 st)
- Division: Middleweight; Welterweight
- Reach: 72.5 in (184 cm)
- Fighting out of: Deerfield Beach, Florida, United States
- Team: American Top Team; Sapo Fight Team
- Rank: Black belt in Brazilian Jiu-Jitsu
- Years active: 2000–2019

Mixed martial arts record
- Total: 79
- Wins: 65
- By knockout: 38
- By submission: 11
- By decision: 16
- Losses: 12
- By knockout: 6
- By submission: 2
- By decision: 4
- Draws: 1
- No contests: 1

Other information
- Mixed martial arts record from Sherdog

Luís Santos (2 January 1980) is a Brazilian professional mixed martial artist competing in the Welterweight division. He last fought for ONE Championship. A professional competitor since 2000, Santos has also formerly competed for Bellator, the WEC, and the XFC.

== Mixed martial arts career ==
=== Early career ===
Santos made his professional MMA debut in a one-night tournament at Tournament of Gladiators 5 in 2000; he won all three of his fights. Santos amassed a record of 18-0 before suffering his first loss in 2005. Although fighting primarily in his native Brazil, Santos did make his U.S. MMA debut on WEC 34 in 2008.

Santos has a black belt in Brazilian Jiu-Jitsu from Team Nogueira. He currently teaches and trains at American Top Team in Coconut Creek but is originally from Belem, Brazil. Before signing with Bellator, Santos was ranked #5 on the Bloody Elbow world MMA scouting report.

=== Bellator ===
In January 2011, it was announced that Santos had signed with Bellator.

Santos debuted for the promotion in the Bellator Season Five Welterweight Tournament. He fought Dan Hornbuckle in the opening round held at Bellator 49 and won the fight via unanimous decision.

Santos lost in the semifinals at Bellator 53 to Ben Saunders via third-round submission.

Santos faced Ryan Ford at Bellator 67. He lost via second-round TKO.

=== Xtreme Fighting Championships ===
Santos faced UFC vet Shamar Bailey at XFC 23 on April 19, 2013. He won the fight via TKO at just over a minute into the first round.

Santos next opponent is Dave Courchaine at XFC 24 on June 14. He won via KO in just ten seconds.

Santos faced Justin Davis at XFC 26: Night of Champions III on October 18, 2013. He won the fight via KO at 0:33 in the first round.

Santos faced Alfredo Morales at XFC International 3 on March 29, 2014. He won via front kick knockout in the third round.

=== ONE Championship ===
Santos faced Bakhtiyar Abbasov at ONE FC: Battle of the Lions on November 7, 2014. He struck Abbasov in the body with a knee causing him to tap out in the first round.

Santos faced Ben Askren in the main event at ONE Championship: Valor of Champions April 24. The fight was ruled "No Contest" after an eye poke from Askren at 2:19 of round 1 rendered Santos unable to continue.

== Personal life ==
Santos is married to fellow MMA fighter Carina Damm.

== Championships and accomplishments ==
- Inside MMA
  - 2014 KO Kick of the Year Bazzie Award vs. Alfredo Morales at XFC International 3

== Mixed martial arts record ==
Professional record breakdown
79 matches	65 wins	12 losses
By knockout	38	6
By submission	11	2
By decision	16	4
Draws	1	
No contests	1	

Res.	Record	Opponent	Method	Event	Date	Round	Time	Location	Notes
Loss	65–12–1 (1)	James Nakashima	TKO (knee injury)	ONE: Roots of Honor	April 12, 2019	2	0:56	Pasay, Philippines	
Win	65–11–1 (1)	Daichi Abe	TKO (body kick)	ONE: Pursuit of Greatness	October 26, 2018	1	0:33	Yangon, Myanmar	
Loss	64–11–1 (1)	Tyler McGuire	Decision (unanimous)	ONE: Pursuit of Power	July 13, 2018	3	5:00	Kuala Lumpur, Malaysia	
Win	64–10–1 (1)	Kiamrian Abbasov	Decision (unanimous)	ONE: Visions of Victory	March 9, 2018	3	5:00	Kuala Lumpur, Malaysia	
Loss	63–10–1 (1)	Zebaztian Kadestam	KO (knees)	ONE: Dynasty of Heroes	May 26, 2017	3	2:18	Kallang, Singapore	Return to Middleweight.
Win	63–9–1 (1)	Igor Svirid	Decision (unanimous)	ONE: Titles and Titans	August 27, 2016	3	5:00	Jakarta, Indonesia	Light Heavyweight debut.
Win	62–9–1 (1)	Rafael Silva	TKO (knee and soccer kicks)	ONE: Tribe of Warriors	February 20, 2016	1	1:17	Jakarta, Indonesia	Middleweight debut.
NC	61–9–1 (1)	Ben Askren	NC (accidental eye poke)	ONE: Valor of Champions	April 24, 2015	1	2:19	Pasay, Philippines	For the ONE Welterweight Championship.
Win	61–9–1	Bakhtiyar Abbasov	TKO (submission to punches)	ONE FC: Battle of the Lions	November 7, 2014	1	0:53	Kallang, Singapore	
Win	60–9–1	Alfredo Morales	KO (front kick)	XFC International 3	March 29, 2014	3	1:34	Osasco, São Paulo, Brazil	
Win	59–9–1	Edilson Moreira Alves	Submission (kneebar)	Inka Fighting Championship 24	October 23, 2013	1	3:00	Lima, Peru	
Win	58–9–1	Justin Davis	KO (head kick and punches)	XFC 26: Night of Champions III	October 18, 2013	1	0:33	Nashville, Tennessee, United States	
Win	57–9–1	Dave Courchaine	KO (head kick and punches)	XFC 24: Collision Course	June 14, 2013	1	0:10	Tampa, Florida, United States	
Win	56–9–1	Sebastian Latorre	TKO (knee and punches)	Smash Fight	May 3, 2013	1	1:22	Curitiba, Brazil	
Win	55–9–1	Shamar Bailey	TKO (punches)	XFC 23: Louisville Slugfest	April 19, 2013	1	1:02	Louisville, Kentucky, United States	
Loss	54–9–1	Ryan Ford	TKO (knee and punches)	Bellator 67	May 4, 2012	2	1:24	Rama, Ontario, Canada	
Loss	54–8–1	Ben Saunders	Submission (keylock)	Bellator 53	October 8, 2011	3	1:45	Miami, Oklahoma, United States	Bellator Season Five Welterweight Tournament Semifinal.
Win	54–7–1	Dan Hornbuckle	Decision (unanimous)	Bellator 49	September 10, 2011	3	5:00	Atlantic City, New Jersey, United States	Bellator Season Five Welterweight Tournament Quarterfinal.
Draw	53–7–1	Carlos Alexandre Pereira	Draw	Amazon Fight 8	May 27, 2011	3	5:00	Belém, Brazil	
Win	53–7	Nicolae Cury	Decision (unanimous)	Bellator 45	May 21, 2011	3	5:00	Lake Charles, Louisiana, US	
Win	52–7	Dave Lehr Cochran	TKO (punches)	Rumble Time Promotions: Explosion	April 15, 2011	1	0:46	St. Charles, Missouri, United States	
Win	51–7	William Dias	Decision (unanimous)	Master Super Fight	December 10, 2010	3	5:00	Belém, Brazil	
Win	50–7	Ivan Jorge	KO (knee)	Amazon Fight 5	October 8, 2010	1	0:52	Belém, Brazil	
Win	49–7	Pedro Irie	Submission (arm-triangle choke)	Amazon Fight 4	August 13, 2010	2	3:59	Belém, Brazil	
Win	48–7	Yuri Fraga	KO (punch)	Amazon Fight 3	March 13, 2010	1	N/A	Belém, Brazil	
Win	47–7	Johnny Vigo	TKO (punches)	Amazon Fight 2	March 4, 2010	2	N/A	Belém, Brazil	
Win	46–7	Elias Monteiro	TKO (punches)	Naja Super Fight 2	July 7, 2009	3	5:00	Salinopolis, Brazil	
Loss	45–7	Adriano Martins	Decision (split)	Hero's The Jungle 3	May 9, 2009	3	5:00	Tokyo, Japan	
Win	45–6	Shelton Arnaldo	TKO (punches)	Nocaute Super Fight	April 19, 2009	1	1:20	Belém, Brazil	
Win	44–6	Norberto dos Santos Neres	Decision (unanimous)	Super Vale Tudo 4	March 13, 2009	3	5:00	Belém, Brazil	
Win	43–6	Wellington Penelva	KO (punches)	Dragon Fight Championship	November 28, 2008	1	3:00	Castanhal, Brazil	
Win	42–6	Predador do Maranhao	KO (punches)	Super Fight Belem	November 8, 2008	1	1:10	Belém, Brazil	
Loss	41–6	Daniel Trindade	Decision (split)	Roraima Show Fight 4	September 14, 2008	3	5:00	Boa Vista, Brazil	
Win	41–5	Pedro Paulo de Jesus	Decision (unanimous)	The King of Jungle 1	August 28, 2008	3	5:00	Belém, Brazil	
Loss	40–5	Alex Serdyukov	TKO (corner stoppage)	WEC 34	June 1, 2008	1	5:00	Sacramento, California, United States	
Loss	40–4	Carlos Alexandre Fereira	Decision (unanimous)	Midway Fight	December 20, 2007	3	5:00	Belém, Brazil	
Win	40–3	Silmar Nunes	KO (punches)	Badboy: Super Fight Nocaute	June 14, 2007	1	N/A	Ananindeua, Brazil	
Win	39–3	Jorge Patino	Decision (unanimous)	Midway Fight	May 10, 2007	3	5:00	Belém, Brazil	
Win	38–3	Rodrigo Ferreira	KO (punches)	Badboy: Super Fight Nocaute	April 12, 2007	1	N/A	Ananindeua, Brazil	
Win	37–3	Daniel Acacio	Decision (unanimous)	SDDS: Super Desafio do Sal Vale Tudo	April 1, 2007	3	5:00	Salinópolis, Brazil	
Win	36–3	Menix Belchoir	KO (punch)	MF: Midway Fight	December 14, 2006	1	4:02	Belém, Brazil	
Win	35–3	Shelton Arnaldo	TKO (elbows)	DDT: Duelo de Titas	November 15, 2006	2	3:20	Teresina, Brazil	
Win	34–3	Josenildo Rodrigues de Oliveira	Decision (unanimous)	MF: Midway Fight	October 5, 2006	3	5:00	Belém, Brazil	
Loss	33–3	Yoshiyuki Yoshida	TKO (corner stoppage)	Kokoro: Kill Or Be Killed	August 15, 2006	1	5:00	Tokyo, Japan	
Win	33–2	Andre Ricardo dos Santos Goncalves	Decision (unanimous)	UCVT: Ultimate Combat Vale Tudo	June 29, 2006	3	5:00	Belém, Brazil	
Win	32–2	Messias Pai de Santo	KO (punches)	SVT: Super Vale Tudo 4	June 13, 2006	2	N/A	Belém, Brazil	
Win	31–2	Celio Santos	TKO (doctor stoppage)	CDL: Clube da Luta 5	May 28, 2006	1	0:48	Salvador, Brazil	
Win	30–2	David Cubas	Decision (unanimous)	GC 2: El Choque	May 12, 2006	3	5:00	Lima, Peru	
Win	29–2	Alexandre Nunes Brandao	Decision (unanimous)	SC: Super Combat	April 21, 2006	3	5:00	Capanema, Brazil	
Win	28–2	Gabriel Castro	KO (knee)	RK: Roraima Kombat	April 8, 2006	1	1:30	Boa Vista, Brazil	
Win	27–2	Claudio do Boxe	Submission (rear-naked choke)	SDDS: Super Desafio do Sal Vale Tudo	December 27, 2005	2	4:32	Rio de Janeiro, Brazil	
Win	26–2	Aloisio Freitas Neto	Decision (unanimous)	RC 2: Roraima Combat 2	December 12, 2005	3	5:00	Boa Vista, Brazil	
Win	25–2	Ildemar Alcântara	Decision (unanimous)	MCVT: Mega Combat Vale Tudo	October 5, 2005	3	5:00	Belém, Brazil	
Win	24–2	Gerson Cordeiro	Submission (rear-naked choke)	UCVT: Ultimate Combat Vale Tudo	September 10, 2005	3	N/A	Belém, Brazil	
Win	23–2	Edvan Souza	TKO (punches)	WC: World Combat 4	August 5, 2005	1	2:15	São Luís, Brazil	
Win	22–2	Joel Leao	KO (punches)	SRVT: Super Radikal Vale Tudo	July 21, 2005	1	N/A	Belém, Brazil	
Loss	21–2	Ildemar Alcântara	Submission (triangle choke)	IMVT: Iron Man Vale Tudo 7	June 11, 2005	2	4:51	Macapá, Brazil	
Win	21–1	Ali Negro	Submission (armbar)	WC: World Combat 3	May 13, 2005	2	3:40	São Luís, Brazil	
Win	20–1	Gabriel Castro	KO (punches)	RC 1: Roraima Combat 1	April 5, 2005	1	N/A	Boa Vista, Brazil	
Win	19–1	Junior Eladio	KO (punches)	WC: World Combat 2	March 4, 2005	1	N/A	São Luís, Brazil	
Win	18–1	Ali Negro	KO (punches)	UCVT: Ultimate Combat Vale Tudo	November 9, 2004	2	2:56	Belém, Brazil	
Win	17–1	Marcio Bomba	KO (punch)	SDDS: Super Desafio do Sal Vale Tudo	November 8, 2004	2	3:50	Salinópolis, Brazil	
Win	16–1	Savio Maia	KO (punch)	Desafio: Interestadual Estrela	October 8, 2004	2	3:00	Belém, Brazil	
Win	15–1	Joao Bosco	Technical Submission (triangle choke)	Desafio: Physical Vale Tudo	June 12, 2004	2	N/A	Belém, Brazil	
Win	14–1	Rosinaldo Costa	KO (punches)	Desafio: Physical Vale Tudo	April 11, 2004	2	N/A	Belém, Brazil	
Win	13–1	Magno Silva de Sousa	Submission (armbar)	Desafio: Physical Vale Tudo	April 11, 2004	2	N/A	Belém, Brazil	
Loss	12–1	Simao Melo da Silva	TKO (submission to punches)	IMVT: Iron Man Vale Tudo 2	January 10, 2004	2	N/A	Macapa, Amapa, Brazil	
Win	12–0	Damian Damian	KO (punches)	UCVT: Ultimate Combat Vale Tudo	September 16, 2003	2	N/A	Belém, Brazil	
Win	11–0	Luiz Falcão	Decision (unanimous)	Super Combate: MMA Fight	September 13, 2003	3	5:00	Belém, Brazil	
Win	10–0	Fabiano Rabugento	TKO (body punch)	SDDS: Super Desafio do Sal Vale Tudo	July 19, 2003	1	3:50	Salinópolis, Brazil	
Win	9–0	Alex Karate	TKO (punches)	NNEVTC: North-Northeast Vale Tudo Championship	May 10, 2003	1	3:40	São Luís, Brazil	
Win	8–0	Fabio Fabio	Submission (rear-naked choke)	FCVT: Fort Combat Vale Tudo	April 5, 2003	1	N/A	Macapa, Amapa, Brazil	
Win	7–0	Wellington Geraldo de Oliveira	KO (punches)	SVT: Super Vale Tudo 3	February 14, 2003	1	N/A	Belém, Brazil	
Win	6–0	Claudio do Boxe	Submission (rear-naked choke)	Badboy: Acai Fight	March 16, 2002	1	3:50	Macapa, Amapa, Brazil	
Win	5–0	Claudio Indio Guerreiro	Submission (armbar)	IPF: I Piaui Fight	June 10, 2001	1	3:50	Brazil	
Win	4–0	Ronaldo Marcio Azevedo	TKO (punches)	Badboy: Rider de Vale Tudo	November 1, 2000	1	4:30	Belém, Brazil	
Win	3–0	Rerison Araujo	Submission (rear-naked choke)	TOF: Tournament of Gladiators 5	March 10, 2000	1	4:30	Nova Friburgo, Brazil	
Win	2–0	Montanha	KO (punches)	TOF: Tournament of Gladiators 5	March 10, 2000	1	4:00	Nova Friburgo, Brazil	
Win	1–0	Felix Felix	KO (punches)	TOF: Tournament of Gladiators 5	March 10, 2000	1	3:40	Nova Friburgo, Brazil	
