= Song Kenan =

Chinese mixed martial artist

Song Kenan 宋克南
- Born: March 10, 1990 (age 36); Tangshan, Hebei, China
- Native name: 宋克南
- Height: 6 ft 0 in (1.83 m)
- Weight: 170 lb (77 kg; 12 st)
- Division: Welterweight; Middleweight
- Reach: 71.5 in (182 cm)
- Fighting out of: Tangshan, China
- Team: MY Fighting Academy
- Years active: 2014–present

Mixed martial arts record
- Total: 31
- Wins: 22
- By knockout: 9
- By submission: 9
- By decision: 4
- Losses: 9
- By knockout: 5
- By decision: 4

Other information
- Mixed martial arts record from Sherdog

Song Kenan (Chinese: 宋克南; born March 10, 1990) is a Chinese mixed martial artist who competed in the Welterweight division for the Ultimate Fighting Championship.

== Mixed martial arts career ==
=== Ultimate Fighting Championship ===
Song's UFC debut came at UFC Fight Night 122 on November 25, 2017, in Shanghai, China. He faced Bobby Nash and won by a very quick KO, after clipping Nash with a right hand and finishing him with some ground strikes, declaring him the winner by KO in only 15 seconds. This win earned him the Performance of the Night bonus.

Song then had his second fight on June 23, 2018, against Hector Aldana at UFC Fight Night 132. After a back and forth first round, Song connected with a right hand that dropped Aldana and followed with some extra strikes for the TKO win.

Song faced Alex Morono at UFC Fight Night 141 on November 24, 2018, in Beijing, China. He lost the fight via unanimous decision. The bout won Song his first Fight of the Night bonus.

Song faced Derrick Krantz on August 31, 2019, at UFC Fight Night 157. He won the fight via unanimous decision.

Song faced Callan Potter on February 23, 2020, at UFC Fight Night 168. He won the fight via knockout in the first round.

Song faced Max Griffin on March 20, 2021, at UFC on ESPN 21. He lost the fight via knockout in round one.

Song faced Ian Machado Garry on March 4, 2023, at UFC 285. He lost the bout via TKO stoppage at the end of the third round.

Song faced Rolando Bedoya at UFC Fight Night 225 on August 26, 2023. He won the bout via unanimous decision.

Song faced Kevin Jousset on December 9, 2023 at UFC Fight Night 233. He lost the fight via unanimous decision.

Song faced Ricky Glenn on August 17, 2024 at UFC 305. He won the fight by unanimous decision.

Song faced Muslim Salikhov on November 23, 2024 at UFC Fight Night 248. He lost the fight via a spinning wheel kick knockout in the first round.

Song was scheduled to face Kiefer Crosbie on August 23, 2025 at UFC Fight Night 257. However, Kenan withdrew from the fight for unknown reasons and was replaced by promotional newcomer Taiyilake Nueraji.

== Championships and accomplishments ==
=== Mixed martial arts ===
- Ultimate Fighting Championship
  - Performance of the Night (One time) vs. Bobby Nash
  - Fight of the Night (One time) vs. Alex Morono

== Mixed martial arts record ==
Professional record breakdown
31 matches	22 wins	9 losses
By knockout	9	5
By submission	9	0
By decision	4	4

Res.	Record	Opponent	Method	Event	Date	Round	Time	Location	Notes
Loss	22–9	Muslim Salikhov	KO (spinning wheel kick)	UFC Fight Night: Yan vs. Figueiredo	November 23, 2024	1	3:49	Macau SAR, China	
Win	22–8	Ricky Glenn	Decision (unanimous)	UFC 305	August 18, 2024	3	5:00	Perth, Australia	
Loss	21–8	Kevin Jousset	Decision (unanimous)	UFC Fight Night: Song vs. Gutiérrez	December 9, 2023	3	5:00	Las Vegas, Nevada, United States	
Win	21–7	Rolando Bedoya	Decision (unanimous)	UFC Fight Night: Holloway vs. The Korean Zombie	August 26, 2023	3	5:00	Kallang, Singapore	
Loss	20–7	Ian Machado Garry	TKO (punches)	UFC 285	March 4, 2023	3	4:22	Las Vegas, Nevada, United States	
Loss	20–6	Max Griffin	KO (punches)	UFC on ESPN: Brunson vs. Holland	March 20, 2021	1	2:20	Las Vegas, Nevada, United States	
Win	20–5	Callan Potter	KO (punches)	UFC Fight Night: Felder vs. Hooker	February 23, 2020	1	2:20	Auckland, New Zealand	
Win	19–5	Derrick Krantz	Decision (unanimous)	UFC Fight Night: Andrade vs. Zhang	August 31, 2019	3	5:00	Shenzhen, China	
Loss	18–5	Alex Morono	Decision (unanimous)	UFC Fight Night: Blaydes vs. Ngannou 2	November 25, 2018	3	5:00	Beijing, China	Fight of the Night.
Win	18–4	Hector Aldana	TKO (punches)	UFC Fight Night: Cowboy vs. Edwards	June 23, 2018	2	4:45	Kallang, Singapore	
Win	17–4	Bobby Nash	KO (punches)	UFC Fight Night: Bisping vs. Gastelum	November 25, 2017	1	0:15	Shanghai, China	Performance of the Night.
Win	16–4	Yerbota Yeluhan	Submission (leg scissor choke)	Chin Woo Men: 2016-2017 Season, Stage 5	February 18, 2017	1	2:13	Guangzhou, China	
Loss	15–4	Brad Riddell	TKO (punch to the body)	Glory of Heroes 6	January 13, 2017	2	3:11	Shenzhen, China	
Loss	15–3	Elnur Agaev	Decision (unanimous)	Road FC 034	November 19, 2016	3	5:00	Shijiazhuang, China	
Win	15–2	Gerhard Voigt	Submission (guillotine choke)	Rebel FC 4	June 25, 2016	1	1:35	Qingdao, China	
Win	14–2	Kenta Takagi	TKO (punches)	Superstar Fight 2: China vs Japan	April 16, 2016	1	3:04	Changsha, China	
Win	13–2	Ooi Aik Tong	TKO (punches)	Bullets Fly FC 4	March 26, 2016	2	2:25	Beijing, China	Catchweight (176 lb) bout.
Win	12–2	Isamu Kanazawa	TKO (punches)	Worldwide MMA Alliance Championship	January 8, 2016	1	3:24	Tokyo, Japan	Return to Welterweight.
Win	11-2	Nosherwan Khanzada	TKO (punches)	CKF 4	December 19, 2015	1	0:24	Beijing, China	Middleweight debut.
Win	10–2	Zhao Zhang	TKO (punches)	CKF 3	November 6, 2015	1	3:03	Xi'an, China	
Loss	9–2	Israel Adesanya	TKO (head kick)	The Legend of Emei 3	August 8, 2015	1	1:59	Shahe, China	Catchweight (187 lb) bout.
Win	9–1	Makshati Sailik	Submission (guillotine choke)	Rebel FC 3	June 27, 2015	1	4:08	Qian'an, China	
Loss	8–1	Yincang Bao	Decision (unanimous)	CKF 3/13	March 13, 2015	3	5:00	Qian'an, China	Catchweight (165 lb) bout.
Win	8–0	Yonghau Xu	Technical Submission (rear-naked choke)	CKF 1/6	January 6, 2015	3	2:51	Qian'an, China	Catchweight (165 lb) bout.
Win	7–0	Sanae Kikuta	Decision (unanimous)	Real 1	December 23, 2014	2	5:00	Tokyo, Japan	Welterweight debut; Song missed weight (177.3 lb).
Win	6–0	Yubin Zhang	Submission (straight armbar)	CKF 11/25	November 15, 2014	1	1:54	Qian'an, China	Catchweight (165 lb) bout.
Win	5–0	Dacheng Liu	Submission (armbar)	CKF 10/27	October 27, 2014	1	2:51	Qian'an, China	Catchweight (176 lb) bout.
Win	4–0	Habiti Tuerxunbieke	Submission (guillotine choke)	CKF 10/14	October 14, 2014	2	0:58	Qian'an, China	Catchweight (176 lb) bout.
Win	3–0	Nannan He	TKO (retirement)	CKF 9/2	September 2, 2014	1	3:00	Qian'an, China	Catchweight (176 lb) bout.
Win	2–0	Wenshuo Guo	Submission (rear-naked choke)	CKF 7/22	July 22, 2014	2	1:08	Tangshan, China	Catchweight (176 lb) bout.
Win	1–0	Fakhriddin	Submission (rear-naked choke)	Dragon Fighter International	May 30, 2014	1	N/A	Baotou, China	Catchweight (176 lb) bout.

== See also ==
- List of male mixed martial artists
