= Júnior Assunção =

Brazilian mixed martial arts fighter

- Born: Cleuder Ferreira Assunção Júnior; 24 June 1981 (age 45); Recife, Brazil
- Height: 5 ft 9 in (1.75 m)
- Weight: 143.1 lb (64.9 kg; 10.22 st)
- Division: Welterweight; Lightweight; Featherweight
- Reach: 71 in (180 cm)
- Fighting out of: Atlanta, Georgia, United States
- Team: Ascension MMA
- Rank: Black belt in Brazilian Jiu-Jitsu; Black rope in Capoeira
- Years active: 2004-2018

Mixed martial arts record
- Total: 23
- Wins: 16
- By knockout: 4
- By submission: 7
- By decision: 5
- Losses: 7
- By knockout: 1
- By submission: 2
- By decision: 4

Other information
- Mixed martial arts record from Sherdog

Cleuder Ferreira Assunção Júnior (born 24 June 1981), known as simply Júnior Assunção, is a Brazilian mixed martial artist who formerly competed in the Lightweight division. A professional competitor since 2004, he has competed for the UFC, the Xtreme Fighting Championships, and King of the Cage.

== Biography ==
Originally from Northeastern Brazil, Junior grew up in Miami, and now resides in Atlanta. He is also the older brother of Raphael Assunção and Freddy Assunção who also fight as mixed martial artists.

== Mixed martial arts career ==
Junior Assuncāo has earned black belts in Brazilian Jiu-Jitsu and Capoeira. His professional MMA career has led to extensive training in these disciplines as well as in Boxing, Judo, Muay Thai, and Wrestling. He has trained out of Black House (Casa Preta) gym in Brazil with the likes of MMA powerhouses Anderson Silva and Lyoto Machida.

Junior's martial arts foundation is in Capoeira, a Brazilian fight system characterized by acrobatic sweeps, kicks, and head butts that rely heavily on core strength. Having trained under Mestre Delei for 12 years, Junior credits his success in the combat sports to this discipline. As an instructor, Junior incorporates many techniques from Capoeira, such as agility, balance, and practical strength.

=== Amateur career ===
Assunção holds an undefeated 2–0 record as an amateur, and made his debut on 17 May 2003, facing Scotty Johnson at ISCF: May Madness in Midtown. He won the fight via second round armbar. In his next amateur fight, Assunção faced Brendan Dumont at Submission Fighting Open 10 on 6 February 2004. He won the fight via guillotine choke, and would officially turn pro in April 2004.

=== Ultimate Fighting Championship ===
With a 4–1 record, Assunção signed with the UFC in late 2006. Assunção faced rising star Kurt Pellegrino at UFC 64 on 14 October 2006. He lost the fight via rear-naked choke. In his next fight in the promotion, Assunção faced David Lee at UFC 70 on 21 April 2007. He won the fight via rear-naked choke.

Assunção then faced Nate Diaz at UFC Fight Night 11 on 19 September 2007. He lost the fight via guillotine choke, and was subsequently released from the promotion

=== Xtreme Fighting Championships ===
After posting a 4–1 on the regional circuit, Assunção signed with Florida based promotion Xtreme Fighting Championships. He faced John Mahlow for the XFC Lightweight Championship at XFC 10: Night of Champions on 19 March 2010. He won the fight via guillotine choke, and vacated the championship to drop down in weight class and re-sign with the UFC.

=== Return to UFC ===
In 2011, Assunção re-signed with the UFC. He faced promotional newcomer Eddie Yagin in a featherweight bout on 24 September 2011 at UFC 135. Assunção went on to win the fight by unanimous decision.

Assunção faced Ross Pearson on 30 December 2011 at UFC 141. He lost the fight via unanimous decision and was subsequently released from the promotion.

=== Post-UFC career ===
Following his second release from UFC, Assunção faced Guilherme Faria for the PFC Featherweight Championship at PFC 2 on 13 September 2013. He won the fight via kimura.

Assunção faced Alejandro Rodriguez at XFC International 5 on 7 June 2014. He won the fight via unanimous decision.

== Championships and accomplishments ==
=== Mixed martial arts ===
- Xtreme Fighting Championships
  - XFC Lightweight Championship (One time)
- Premium Fight Championship
  - PFC Featherweight Championship (One time, current)

== Mixed martial arts record ==
Professional record breakdown
23 matches	16 wins	7 losses
By knockout	4	1
By submission	7	2
By decision	5	4

Res.	Record	Opponent	Method	Event	Date	Round	Time	Location	Notes
Loss	16–7	Arman Tsarukyan	Decision (unanimous)	Kunlun Fight World Tour: Russia	26 May 2018	3	5:00	Khabarovsk, Russia	Lightweight bout.
Loss	16–6	Adam Townsend	TKO (knee injury)	Art of War 18	30 July 2016	1	0:49	Beijing, China	Welterweight debut.
Win	16–5	Mauricio dos Santos Jr.	TKO (head kick)	XFC International 13	5 December 2015	2	3:51	São Paulo, Brazil	
Win	15–5	Alejandro Solano Rodriguez	Decision (unanimous)	XFC International 5	7 June 2014	5	5:00	Osasco, São Paulo, Brazil	
Win	14–5	Guilherme Faria de Souza	Submission (kimura)	Premium FC 2	13 September 2013	4	2:05	Campinas, São Paulo, Brazil	Won the PFC Featherweight Championship.
Loss	13–5	Ross Pearson	Decision (unanimous)	UFC 141	30 December 2011	3	5:00	Las Vegas, Nevada, United States	
Win	13–4	Eddie Yagin	Decision (unanimous)	UFC 135	24 September 2011	3	5:00	Denver, Colorado, United States	
Win	12–4	Wesley Murch	Submission (rear-naked choke)	Recife FC 4	31 March 2011	1	5:00	Recife, Brazil	
Win	11–4	Mark Miller	KO (punch)	Recife FC 3	3 December 2010	1	4:03	Recife, Brazil	
Win	10–4	John Mahlow	Submission (guillotine choke)	XFC 10: Night of Champions	19 March 2010	1	4:02	Tampa, Florida, United States	Won vacant XFC Lightweight Championship.
Win	9–4	Peter Grimes	Decision (split)	ShineFights 2	4 September 2009	3	5:00	Miami, Florida, United States	
Win	8–4	Kamrin Naville	Decision (unanimous)	KOTC: Invincible	27 March 2009	3	3:00	Atlanta, Georgia, United States	
Win	7–4	Kalvin Hackney	Decision (unanimous)	Wild Bill's Fight Night 17	8 Nov 2008	3	5:00	Atlanta, Georgia, United States	
Loss	6–4	Torrance Taylor	Decision (unanimous)	American Fight League: Bulletproof	30 May 2008	3	5:00	Atlanta, Georgia, United States	
Win	6–3	Steve Sharp	Submission (guillotine choke)	American Fight League: Erupption	7 March 2008	3	4:26	Lexington, Kentucky, United States	
Loss	5–3	Nate Diaz	Submission (guillotine choke)	UFC Fight Night 11	19 September 2007	1	4:10	Las Vegas, Nevada, United States	
Win	5–2	David Lee	Submission (rear-naked choke)	UFC 70	21 April 2007	2	1:55	Manchester, England	
Loss	4–2	Kurt Pellegrino	Submission (rear-naked choke)	UFC 64: Unstoppable	14 October 2006	1	2:04	Las Vegas, Nevada, United States	
Win	4–1	Scott Hope	TKO (punches)	International Sport Combat Federation: Knuckle Up 4	28 April 2006	1	1:43	Kennesaw, Georgia, United States	
Win	3–1	Dustin Hazelett	TKO (punches)	Full Throttle 3	15 July 2005	1	4:27	Georgia, United States	
Win	2–1	Danny Payne	Submission (rear-naked choke)	Full Throttle 2	3 June 2005	1	0:50	Atlanta, Georgia, United States	
Win	1–1	Will Bradford	Submission (guillotine choke)	International Sport Combat Federation: Compound Fracture 2	4 February 2005	1	1:55	Atlanta, Georgia, United States	
Loss	0–1	Andrew Chappelle	Decision (unanimous)	International Sport Combat Federation: Fight Party	23 April 2004	3	3:00	Atlanta, Georgia, United States	

== Amateur mixed martial arts record ==
Professional record breakdown
2 matches	2 wins	0 losses
By knockout	0	0
By submission	2	0
By decision	0	0

Res.	Record	Opponent	Method	Event	Date	Round	Time	Location	Notes
Win	2–0	Brendan Dumont	Submission (guillotine choke)	International Sport Combat Federation: Submission Fighting Open 10	6 February 2004	1	N/A	Macon, Georgia, United States	
Win	1–0	Scotty Johnson	Submission (armbar)	International Sport Combat Federation: May Madness	17 May 2003	2	N/A	Atlanta, Georgia, United States	

== See also ==
- List of male mixed martial artists
