= UFC on Fox: Shevchenko vs. Peña =

UFC mixed martial arts event in 2017

- The poster for UFC on Fox: Shevchenko vs. Peña
- Promotion: Ultimate Fighting Championship
- Date: January 28, 2017
- Venue: Pepsi Center
- City: Denver, Colorado
- Attendance: 13,233
- Total gate: $1,020,434

Event chronology
UFC Fight Night: Rodríguez vs. Penn	UFC on Fox: Shevchenko vs. Peña	UFC Fight Night: Bermudez vs. The Korean Zombie

UFC on Fox: Shevchenko vs. Peña (also known as UFC on Fox 23) was a mixed martial arts event promoted by the Ultimate Fighting Championship held on January 28, 2017, at Pepsi Center in Denver, Colorado.

== Background ==
A potential UFC Women's Bantamweight Championship title eliminator between multiple-time muay thai world champion Valentina Shevchenko and The Ultimate Fighter: Team Rousey vs. Team Tate bantamweight winner Julianna Peña served as the event headliner.

A bantamweight bout between Raphael Assunção and Aljamain Sterling was originally booked for UFC Fight Night: Lewis vs. Abdurakhimov. However, Sterling pulled out due to an undisclosed injury. The fight was later rescheduled for this event.

Yancy Medeiros was expected to face Li Jingliang at the event. However, in early January, Medeiros pulled out for undisclosed reasons and was replaced by promotional newcomer Bobby Nash.

A middleweight bout between former Bellator Middleweight Champion Héctor Lombard and Brad Tavares was expected to take place at this event, but was scrapped on January 10 due to undisclosed reasons.

A week before the event, promotional newcomer John Phillips pulled out of his light heavyweight bout against Marcos Rogério de Lima and was replaced by fellow newcomer Jeremy Kimball.

At the weigh-ins, Lima came in at 209.5 lb, 3.5 lb over the light heavyweight limit of 206 lb. As a result, Lima was fined 20% of his purse, which went to Kimball and the bout proceeded as scheduled at catchweight.

== Results ==
Main Card (Fox)
Weight class				Method	Round	Time	Notes
Women's Bantamweight	Valentina Shevchenko	def.	Julianna Peña	Submission (armbar)	2	4:29
Welterweight	Jorge Masvidal	def.	Donald Cerrone	TKO (punches)	2	1:00
Heavyweight	Francis Ngannou	def.	Andrei Arlovski	TKO (punches)	1	1:32
Featherweight	Jason Knight	def.	Alex Caceres	Submission (rear-naked choke)	2	4:21
Preliminary Card (Fox Sports 1)
Middleweight	Sam Alvey	def.	Nate Marquardt	Decision (unanimous) (29–28, 29–28, 29–28)	3	5:00
Bantamweight	Raphael Assunção	def.	Aljamain Sterling	Decision (split) (28–29, 29–28, 29–28)	3	5:00
Welterweight	Li Jingliang	def.	Bobby Nash	KO (punches)	2	4:45
Light Heavyweight	Jordan Johnson	def.	Henrique da Silva	Decision (unanimous) (30–27, 30–27, 30–27)	3	5:00
Middleweight	Eric Spicely	def.	Alessio Di Chirico	Submission (triangle choke)	1	2:14
Catchweight (209.5 lb)	Marcos Rogério de Lima	def.	Jeremy Kimball	TKO (punches)	1	2:27
Preliminary Card (UFC Fight Pass)
Flyweight	Alexandre Pantoja	def.	Eric Shelton	Decision (split) (29–28, 28–29, 29–28)	3	5:00
Lightweight	Jason Gonzalez	def.	J.C. Cottrell	Submission (D'arce choke)	1	3:54

== Bonus awards ==
The following fighters were awarded $50,000 bonuses:

- Fight of the Night: Not awarded
- Performance of the Night: Valentina Shevchenko, Jorge Masvidal, Francis Ngannou and Jason Knight

== See also ==
- 2017 in UFC
- List of UFC events
