= Xtreme Fighting Championships =

MMA promoter based in Destin, Florida

Xtreme Fighting Championships (XFC)
- Type: Public
- Traded as: Expert Market: XFCI
- Industry: Mixed martial arts promotion
- Founded: 2006, 2020 (relaunch)
- Founders: John Prisco
- Headquarters: Spring Lake, Michigan, United States
- Website: www.xfcfight.com

Xtreme Fighting Championships (XFC) is a premier international mixed martial arts (MMA) organization based in Spring Lake, Michigan, with offices throughout the United States and South America. The XFC showcases both male and female fighters, advocates young MMA fighters, and produces stadium fight cards in various locations in the United States and South America, including Florida, Kentucky, Tennessee, Michigan, São Paulo, Campinas, and Araraquara.

Throughout 2006–2012, the XFC hosted 4–6 events per year, travelling around the United States and Greece. In 2013, the company announced its new executive team, as well as a broadcast partnership with an open broadcaster in South America, RedeTV!. This began the International Tournament & Super-Fight Series. The unprecedented success of the 2014 Season I Series allowed the XFC to secure various partnerships with various global broadcasters, including Terra TV, HBO America, and UOL. The XFC featured more than 185 MMA fighters from 36 countries.

After a 4-year hiatus, XFC returned in late 2020, with a relaunch event, XFC 43, that took place on November 11, 2020, in Atlanta, Georgia. Milpitas ca, Alfonso Montano.

On, April 15, 2025, the Securities and Exchange Commission obtained final judgments by consent against Florida-based Xtreme Fighting Championships, Inc. and its CEO, Steve A. Smith, Jr. In December 2024, the commission charged Xtreme Fighting and Smith with engaging in a fraudulent scheme to sell Xtreme Fighting stock to the investing public illegally. Securities and Exchange Commission v. Steve A. Smith, Jr. and Xtreme Fighting Championships, Inc., No. 1:24-cv-24802 (S.D. Fla. filed Dec. 9, 2024).

== History ==
=== XFC 1: Dynamite ===
The organization's first stadium event was called XFC 1: Dynamite and was staged at the St. Pete Times Forum in Tampa, Florida, on November 11, 2007. The show officially drew over 11,000 MMA fans, tripling the former record for attendance at an MMA event in the state of Florida.

=== XFC 2: Rage in the Cage ===
The XFC returned to the St. Pete Times forum on March 2, 2008, with a show called XFC 2: Rage in the Cage. Among the celebrities in attendance was former professional wrestling star Hulk Hogan, who watched his nephew David Bollea win his professional debut on the XFC undercard. Bollea had issued a to boxer-versus-MMA fighter challenge to boxing champion Floyd Mayweather leading up to his fight.

=== XFC 3: Battle in the Bluegrass ===
The company's third event was its first show staged outside of Florida, taking place at the Rupp Arena in Lexington, Kentucky, and drew 6,000 fans on Saturday, June 7; a small riot broke out after the main event, when local favorite Benny Stanley was choked out by Scott Porter in 13 seconds, leading to one arrest. Another known local Brad Chamberlain won via KO in the first round. WNKY, Lexington's NBC News affiliate, reported that XFC set the Kentucky statewide record for MMA attendance with the promotion.

=== XFC 4: Judgement in the Cage ===
XFC 4: Judgement in the Cage returned to the St. Pete Times Forum in Tampa on June 28, 2008, and drew over 10,700 fans, at the time the second largest crowd for an MMA promotion in Florida history.—trailing only XFC's first Dynamite for the overall Florida attendance record. John "Mulatto Mauler" Mahlow defeated Eben "The Big O" Oroz by unanimous decision for the XFC lightweight title in the main event, and in the undercard, the much-heralded Matt Juncal—a three-time high school state wrestling champion from nearby Brandon, Florida, and a former college All-American wrestler—made his MMA debut, defeating the also-debuting Jeff Mansir by submission in the first round.

=== XFC 5: Return of the Giant ===
The main event of XFC's fifth show, XFC 5: Return of the Giant, which took place on September 13, 2008, at the St. Pete Times Forum, featured the MMA comeback of Gan McGee. McGee, who stands six-foot, 10-inches tall and is known as "The Giant," had last fought on American soil during a UFC Pay-Per-View, when he battled heavyweight champion Tim Sylvia for UFC's world title. The fight ended up being highly controversial; Sylvia defeated McGee, but tested positive for steroids in a post-fight drug test. Sylvia was suspended by the Nevada Boxing Commission for six-months and was stripped of his title, but McGee was never granted a rematch, nor was the loss expunged from his record. McGee faced Johnathan Ivey, a 250-pound brawler who stated that McGee "should've stayed retired."

Ivey failed to deliver on his pre-fight promise: a record-setting 11,200 fans watched McGee defeat Ivey by second-round knockout.

=== XFC 6: Clash of the Continents ===
On December 5, 2008, XFC closed out the year with its sixth promotion, XFC 6: Clash of the Continents, returning once again to the St. Pete Times Forum. The show featured a heavyweight showdown in the main event, with the top-ranked heavyweight in Africa, South African heavyweight champion Rico Hattingh, against undefeated American heavyweight Chad Corvin. Also on the card was the MMA debut of four-time world female boxing champion of Chevelle Hallback, in the XFC's first-ever female cage fight.

Hallback won by TKO in the first round, and Corvin beat Hattingh, knocking out the South African heavyweight champion.

Among the celebrities in attendance were Linda Hogan, her young boyfriend, and her son Nick Hogan. When the three were introduced to the crowd, the audience booed loudly. Video of the Hogans getting booed at the XFC event aired on E!, TMZ, and celebrity websites like Perez Hilton.

=== XFC 7: School of Hard Knox ===
XFC made history on February 20, 2009, when it produced the first-ever professional MMA show in Tennessee state history; the Tennessee state legislature had legalized MMA only months earlier. At XFC 7: School of Hard Knox, former University of Tennessee football player Ovince St. Preux knocked out CT Turner with a kick to the head and Chad Corvin stayed undefeated by stopping the then-6–0 Scott Barrett in the first round.

=== XFC 8: Regional Conflict ===
The XFC's first televised fight card featured XFC 8 in Knoxville, Tennessee on April 25, 2009. Jarrod Card defeated Bruce Connors by unanimous decision in the main event of the evening to claim the XFC featherweight title. Light heavyweight prospect Ovince St. Preux, who has gone on to compete in Strikeforce, submitted his opponent, Ombey Mobley, via calf slicer.

=== XFC 9: Evolution ===
XFC 9 was held in Tampa Bay on September 5, 2009. The card was headlined by a fight between Jon Koppenhaver and Florida native Mikey Gomez. Koppenhaver won the bout via technical knockout early in the third round.

=== XFC 10: Night of Champions ===
Remaining in Tampa Bay, XFC hosted their tenth event on March 19, 2010. Jarrod Card submitted Jason Wood with a rear naked choke to retain the XFC featherweight title in the feature bout. Júnior Assunção caught John Mahlow in a guillotine choke in the first round of their bout to capture the XFC lightweight title.

=== XFC 11: The Next Generation ===
Tampa Bay saw the eleventh XFC event on July 9, 2010. In the feature bout, Micah Miller knocked out former top ranked Florida featherweight Bruce Connors inside of one round. Miller connected with a knee from the Thai plum and threw a flurry of punches, ending with a left jab.

Main card
| Weight class | | | | Method | Round | Time | Notes |
|---|---|---|---|---|---|---|---|
| Featherweight | Micah Miller | def. | Bruce Connors | KO (punch) | 1 | 2:01 |
| Women's Flyweight | Marianna Kheyfets | def. | Kim Couture | Submission (triangle choke) | 1 | 3:06 |
| Middleweight | Mike Bernhard | def. | Gerardo Julio Gallegos | TKO (punches) | 1 | 3:56 |
| Middleweight | Jeremy Smith | def. | Dustin Rhodes | TKO (punches) | 2 | 1:05 |
| Welterweight | Ian Stephens | def. | Ryan Quinn | Decision (unanimous) | 3 | 5:00 |
| Heavyweight | Chris Barnett | def. | Jay White | KO (punches) | 1 | 4:39 |
| Welterweight | Alex Poulsen | def. | Jake Albinio | Submission (armbar) | 1 | 1:43 |
| Catchweight (157 lbs.) | Khayrullo Kokiev | def. | Avery McPhatter | Decision (split) | 3 | 5:00 |

=== XFC 12: Mayhem ===
XFC 12 took place on October 10, 2010, a non sanctioned bout in Kyrenia, Cyprus. In the feature bout, XFC Featherweight Champion Jarrod Card submitted Tony Hervey with a rear naked choke in a 150 lb. catchweight bout. Meanwhile, highly ranked welterweight prospect Joe Ray stopped Gerardo Julio Gallegos in the first round due to a cut over the eye in their bout.

=== XFC 13: Unstoppable ===
XFC returned to Tampa Bay for their thirteenth event, which occurred on December 3, 2010. A featherweight title bout between Jarrod Card and Luis Palomino headlined the card. The bout went all five rounds, with Palomino winning a unanimous decision. Chris Barnett defeated Mario Rinaldi by TKO in the second round of their bout, while prospect Joe Ray dropped a split decision to Jeremy Smith.

Main card
| Weight class | | | | Method | Round | Time | Notes |
|---|---|---|---|---|---|---|---|
| Featherweight | Luis Palomino | def. | Jarrod Card (c) | Decision (unanimous) | 5 | 5:00 | (Note: XFC Featherweight Championship) |
| Heavyweight | Chris Barnett | def. | Mario Rinaldi | TKO (punches) | 2 | 1:44 |
| Women's Flyweight | Marianna Kheyfets | def. | Marissa Caldwell | Decision (unanimous) | 3 | 5:00 |
| Heavyweight | Gabriel Salinas-Jones | def. | Parker Porter | Submission (neck crank) | 1 | 4:50 |
| Welterweight | Ian Stephens | def. | Joe Heink | Decision (unanimous) | 3 | 5:00 |
| Middleweight | Jeremy Smith | def. | Joe Ray | Decision (split) | 3 | 5:00 |
| Featherweight | Jason Hicks | def. | Mike Milmerstadt | KO (punch) | 1 | 1:36 |
| Featherweight | Joe Calavitta | def. | Horacio Rodriguez | Submission (rear naked choke) | 1 | 3:16 |
| Middleweight | Sammy Rodriguez | def. | Joe Johnson | Submission (rear naked choke) | 1 | 2:01 |
| Lightweight | Avery McPhatter | def. | Mark Brown | Submission (rear naked choke) | 2 | 4:50 |

=== XFC 14: Resurrection ===
Oct. 21, 2011

- Jamie Varner def Nate Jolly via TKO (strikes) at 1:09 of round one
- Carmelo Marrero def Scott Barrett via unanimous decision
- Marianna Kheyfets def Molly Helsel via unanimous decision
- Reggie Pena def Josh Clark via unanimous decision
- Nicolae Cury def Elijah Harshbargar via submission (armbar) at 1:27 of round one
- Mikey Gomez def Mike Bernhard via submission (rear-naked choke) at 3:50 of round two
- John Mahlow def Bruce Connors via unanimous decision. (30–27, 30–27, 30–27) Rd 3 (5:00)

=== XFC 15: Tribute ===
Took place on December 2, 2011 in Tampa, Florida at the St. Pete Times Forum

MAIN CARD (HDNet)

- Lightweight bout: Eric Reynolds def. Jonatas Novaes by unanimous decision (29–28, 29–28, 29–28) Rd 3 (5:00)
- Women's (115 lbs.) bout: Carla Esparza def. Felice Herrig by unanimous decision (30–27, 30–27, 30–27) Rd 3 (5:00)
- Lightweight bout: Nick Newell def. Denis Hernandez by submission (heel hook) Rd 1 (1:11)
- Welterweight bout: Corey Hill def. Charlie Rader by submission (D’arce Choke) Rd 1 (3:58)
- Heavyweight bout: Brandon Sayles def. Imani Lee by submission (verbal) Rd 1 (3:09)
- Welterweight bout: Ryan Thomas def. John Kolosci by submission (modified triangle choke) Rd 1 (4:46)
- Bantamweight bout: Marlon Moraes def. Chris Manuel by unanimous decision (30–27, 30–27, 30–27) Rd 3 (5:00)

=== XFC 16: High Stakes ===
Took place on February 10, 2012 in Knoxville, TN

MAIN CARD (HDNet)

- Lightweight bout: Jamie Varner defeated Drew Fickett via submission (punches) at 0:40 of round 1.
- Middleweight bout: Josh Samman defeated Mikey Gomez via submission (punches) at 3:37 of round 1.
- Women's 125 lbs bout: Marianna Kheyfets defeated Heather Jo Clark via TKO (doctor stoppage) at 5:00 of round 1.
- Catchweight (130 lbs) bout: Chris Wright defeated Len Cook via unanimous decision (30–27, 30–27, 30–27).
- Super Heavyweight bout: Chase Gormley defeated Brandon Sayles via unanimous decision (29–28, 29–28, 29–28).
- Middleweight bout: Amaechi Oselukwue defeated Julio Gallegos via KO (punch) at 1:23 of round 1.
- Middleweight bout: Dustin West defeated Stoney Hale via TKO (punches) at 1:23 of round 1.

=== XFC 17: Apocalypse ===
Took place on April 13, 2012, in Jackson, Tennessee

MAIN CARD (HDNet)

- Lightweight bout: Eric Reynolds def. Luciano Dos Santos via unanimous decision
- Featherweight bout: Marlon Moraes def. Jarrod Card via KO at 0:48 of round 1
- Catchweight bout: (152 lbs.): Nick Newell def. Chris Coggins via unanimous decision
- Women's 115 lbs.: Felice Herrig def. Patricia Vidonic via unanimous decision
- Welterweight bout: Charles Blanchard def. Johnny Davis via unanimous decision
- Lightweight bout:

Ion Wood def. Ronnie Rogers via submission (guillotine) at 2:15 of round 2

- Middleweight bout: Joel Cooper def. Amaechi Oselukwue via unanimous decision

PRELIMINARY CARD:

- Light Heavyweight bout: Teddy Holder def. Bobby Carter by submission (armbar) at 3:27 of round 1
- Catchweight bout, (187 lbs.): Bradley Stafford def. Tommy Roberts by unanimous decision
- Featherweight bout: Steven Durr def. Michael Manley by unanimous decision

=== XFC 18: Music City Mayhem ===
Took place in Nashville, TN on Friday June 22, 2012

MAIN CARD (AXStv):

- Middleweight bout: Reggie Pena def. John Salter by submission (guillotine) Rd 2 (0:36)
- Heavyweight bout; Scott Barrett def. Gabriel Salinas-Jones by split decision (30–27, 28–29, 30–27)
- Flyweight bout: Heather Jo Clark def. Avery Vilche by submission (rear naked choke) Rd 1 (1:03)
- Featherweight bout: Luke Sanders def. Zachary Sanders by TKO (strikes) Rd 1 (4:53)
- Lightweight bout: Donny Wallace def. Jason Blackford by submission (armbar) Rd 1 (4:38)
- Lightweight bout: Scott Holtzman def. Matt Metts by TKO (strikes) Rd 1 (4:13)
- Welterweight bout: Joe Ray def. Dustin West by submission (arm triangle) Rd 2 (1:04)

PRELIMINARY CARD:

- Lightweight bout: Nate Landwehr def. Billy Mullins by KO (punch) Rd 2 (1:21)
- Middleweight bout: Michael Graham def. Cory Robison by unanimous decision (30–27, 30–27, 30–27)
- Welterweight bout: Devan Plaisance def. Jonathan Ivey by unanimous decision (29–27, 30–27, 30–27)
- Flyweight bout: Justin Pennington def. Dave Hurst by KO (strikes) Rd 1 (4:32)

=== XFC 19: Charlotte Showdown ===
Took place on August 3, 2012, in Charlotte, North Carolina, at the Grady Cole Center

MAIN CARD (AXS TV)

- Welterweight bout: Nicolae Cury def. Roger Carroll via unanimous decision (29–28, 29–28, 29–28)
- Strawweight bout: Felice Herrig def. Simona Soukupova via unanimous decision (30–27, 30–27, 29–28)
- Lightweight bout: Nick Newell def. David Mays via knockout (knees) - Round 1, 2:01
- Lightweight bout: Jason Hicks def. Shane Crenshaw via submission (armbar) - Round 2, 3:41
- Lightweight bout: Kevin Forant def. Joe Elmore via unanimous decision (30–27, 30–27, 30–27)
- Featherweight bout: Keith Richardson def. Lawson McClure via submission (rear-naked choke) - Round 1, 3:40
- Middleweight bout: Johnny Buck def. Ricky Rainey via knockout (punches) - Round 2, 1:32

PRELIMINARY CARD (Untelevised)

- Lightweight bout: Joey Carroll def. Jeff Tharington via TKO (strikes) - Round 1
- Heavyweight bout: Zach Klouse def. Tony Scarlett via TKO (knees) - Round 1, 3:10
- Lightweight bout: Carlos Vivas def. Brian Karmolinski via TKO (strikes) - Round 1

=== XFC 20: High Octane ===
Took place on September 28, 2012, in Knoxville, Tennessee at the Knoxville Civic Auditorium.

MAIN CARD

- Lightweight bout: Eric Reynolds def. Lorenzo Borgomeo by Submission (Guillotine Choke) at 3:58, R2
- lightweight bout: Scott Holtzman def. Chris Coggins by TKO (Strikes) at 4:46, R1
- Women's Flyweight bout: Sofia Bagherdai def. Sarah Maloy by TKO (Strikes) at 4:01, R1
- Bantamweight bout: Joby Sanchez def. Chris Dunn by Submission (Triangle Choke) at 1:49, R1
- Bantamweight bout: Shah Bobonis def. Cornelius Godfrey by Unanimous Decision
- Welterweight bout: Drew Kennedy def. Anthony Lemon by Submission (Rear Naked Choke) at 4:20, R1
- Featherweight bout: Nate Landwehr def. Chris Wright by TKO (Strikes) at 3:56, R2

Preliminary Bouts:

- Welterweight bout: Craig Johnson def. Zachary Odom by TKO (Strikes), R2
- Lightweight bout: Ian Boxhorn def. Chad Perrine by Unanimous Decision
- Featherweight bout: Adam Hyde def. David Miles by Submission (Rear Naked Choke), R3
- Welterweight bout: Jake Fine def. Steven Thomas by submission (Rear Naked Choke), R1
- Bantamweight bout: Tyler Hunley def. Chonci Houston by Unanimous Decision

=== XFC 21: Night of Champions II ===
Took place on December 7, 2012 in Nashville, Tennessee at the Nashville Municipal Auditorium.

MAIN CARD (AXS TV)

- Lightweight Championship bout: Nick Newell def. Eric Reynolds via submission (rear-naked choke) - Round 1, 1:22 (for vacant lightweight title)
- Welterweight bout: Ryan Thomas def. Corey Hill via submission (armbar) - Round 1, 2:34
- Women's Flyweight bout: Stephanie Eggink def. Heather Clark via unanimous decision (29–28, 30–27, 30–27)
- Welterweight bout: Ricky Rainey def. Donny Wallace via TKO (punches) - Round 1, 1:42
- Featherweight bout: Jarrod Card def. Keith Richardson via submission (guillotine choke) - Round 2, 0:24

PRELIMINARY CARD

- Middleweight bout: Marcus Finch def. Dustin West via knockout strikes) - Round 1, 0:46
- Lightweight bout: Jorge Medina def. D.J. Miller via submission (rear-naked choke) - Round 3, 2:36
- Featherweight bout: Cromwell Stewart def. Zachary Hicks via split decision
- Welterweight bout: Gerric Hayes def. Jason Blackford via TKO - Round 2, 2:56
- Middleweight bout: Tommy Roberts def. Josh Phelps via TKO - Round 1, 3:07

=== XFC 22: Crossing The Line ===
Took place on February 22, 2013 in Charlotte, North Carolina at the Grady Cole Center.

MAIN CARD (AXS TV)

- Lightweight bout: Scott Holtzman def. Jason Hicks via unanimous decision (30–27, 30–27, 30–27) (title eliminator)
- Welterweight bout: Ricky Rainey def. Joseph Corneroli via unanimous decision (30–27, 30–27, 30–27)
- Women's Strawweight bout: Pearl Gonzalez def. Suzie Montero via submission (armbar) Round 1, 4:56
- Welterweight bout: Roger Carroll def. Josh Eagans via submission (triangle choke) Round 2, 0:59
- Flyweight bout: D'Angelo Bynum def. Jimmy Fowler via unanimous decision (30–27, 30–27, 29–28)
- Featherweight bout: D'juan Owens def. Nate Landwehr via unanimous decision (29–28, 29–28, 30–27)

PRELIMINARY CARD

- Bantamweight bout: Joseph Carroll def. Len Cook via unanimous decision
- Lightweight bout: Jeremy Severn def. Aaron Osborne via submission (armbar) Round 1, 4:50
- Bantamweight bout: Rahshun Ball def. Thomas Campbell via unanimous decision
- Lightweight bout: Cody Wells def. Luke Neyland via TKO (strikes) Round 1, 2:45
- Featherweight bout: Carlos Vivas def. Brandon Boggs via TKO Round 1, 3:56

=== XFC 23: Louisville Slugfest ===
Took place on April 19, 2013, in Louisville, Kentucky at the Kentucky International Convention Centre.

MAIN CARD (AXS TV)

- Welterweight bout: Luis Santos def. Shamar Bailey via TKO (strikes), Round 1, 1:02
- Women's Strawweight bout: Stephanie Eggink def. Brianna Van Buren via Decision (unanimous)
- Featherweight bout: Zack Underwood def. Deivison Ribeiro via Decision (unanimous)
- Flyweight bout: Joey Diehl def. Eric Moell via Submission (guillotine choke), Round 2, 0:31
- Middleweight bout: Julio Gallegos def. John Troyer via TKO (strikes), Round 2, 1:41
- Featherweight bout: B.J. Ferguson def. Charles Stanford via TKO (strikes], Round 1, 0:59

PRELIMINARY CARD

- Lightweight bout: Eugene Perrin def. Augusta Tindall via Decision (unanimous)
- Middleweight bout: Scott Hope def. Joshua Blanchard via TKO (strikes), Round 1, 1:25
- Featherweight bout: Brandon Sandefur def. Josh Cooper via Submission (rear naked choke), Round 2, 1:35

AMATEUR CARD

- Welterweight bout: Brandon Hurst def. Eric Jarvis via Decision (unanimous)

=== XFC 24: Collision Course ===
Took place on June 14, 2013, in Tampa, Florida, US

- Lightweight Championship bout: Scott Holtzman def. John Mahlow via TKO (strikes) at 2:53, Round two to win vacant XFC lightweight title
- Welterweight bout: Ricky Rainey def. Reggie Pena via TKO (strikes) at 4:33 of round one
- Welterweight bout: Luis Santos def. Dave Courchaine via TKO (strikes) at :10 of round one
- Lightweight bout: Eric Reynolds def. Kevin Forant by submission (arm-triangle choke) at 4:13 of round one
- Women's Flyweight bout: Cortney Casey def. Kelly Warren by submission (rear-naked choke) at 3:33 of round one
- Featherweight bout: Deivison Ribeiro def. Shah Bobonis via unanimous decision (30–27, 30–27, 30–27)
- Featherweight bout: John Cofer def. Chad Livingston via unanimous decision (29–28, 29–28, 29–28)
- Featherweight bout: Nick Smith def. Ladarious Jackson via disqualification (illegal knee) at 2:38 of round two
- Bantamweight bout: Patrick Williams def. Gabe Maldonado via TKO (punches) at :50 of round one
- Bantamweight bout: Jason Ignacek def. Kenneth Crowder via submission (triangle choke) at 1:03 of round two
- Bantamweight bout: Gilbert Burgos def. Jason Gladey via unanimous decision (30–27, 30–27, 29–28)

=== XFC 25: Boiling Point ===
Took place on September 6, 2013, in Albuquerque, New Mexico, US

- Women's Strawweight Championship bout: Stephanie Eggink def. Angela Magaña via Submission (triangle) at 3:10 of round two
- Welterweight bout: Dheigo Lima def. Ricky Rainey via Decision (unanimous)
- Welterweight bout: Ryan Thomas def. Rocky France via Submission (triangle choke) at 1:27 of round two
- Bantamweight bout: Joby Sanchez def. Eric Moell via TKO (elbows) at 3:15 of round one
- Featherweight Semifinal Tournament bout: Farkhad Sharipov def. Stephen Bass via TKO (punches) at 4:19 of round two
- Lightweight bout: Lando Vannata def. J. P. Reese via Decision (split)

=== XFC 26: Night of Champions III ===
Took place on October 18, 2013, in Nashville, Tennessee, US

Main card
| Weight class | | | | Method | Round | Time | Notes |
|---|---|---|---|---|---|---|---|
| Lightweight | Scott Holtzman (c) | def. | Roger Carroll | Decision (unanimous) | 5 | 5:00 | (Note: XFC Lightweight Championship) |
| Women's Flyweight | Pearl Gonzalez | def. | Cortney Casey | Submission (armbar) | 3 | 4:43 | (Note: Inaugural XFC Women's Flyweight Championship) |
| Featherweight | Deivison Ribeiro | def. | Jason Hicks | TKO (strikes) | 1 | 4:08 | (Note: XFC Featherweight Championship Tournament Semi-Final) |
| Welterweight | Luis Santos | def. | Justin Davis | TKO (strikes) | 1 | 0:33 |
| Women's Strawweight | Heather Jo Clark | def. | Hannah Cifers | Decision (unanimous) | 3 | 5:00 |
| Featherweight | Luke Sanders | def. | Zach Underwood | TKO (strikes) | 2 | 3:38 |

=== XFC 27: Frozen Fury ===
Took place on December 13, 2013, in Muskegon, Michigan, US

Main card
| Weight class | | | | Method | Round | Time | Notes |
|---|---|---|---|---|---|---|---|
| Featherweight | Deivison Ribeiro | def. | Farkhad Sharipov | Decision (unanimous) | 5 | 5:00 | (Note: XFC Featherweight Championship Tournament Final) |
| Lightweight | Dom O'Grady | def. | Eric Reynolds | Submission (rear naked choke) | 2 | 1:42 |
| Catchweight | Dequan Townsend | def. | Marcus Reynolds | KO (kick to the body) | 3 | 2:52 |
| Lightweight | Dave Courchaine | def. | Alex Trevino | KO (punch) | 2 | 0:37 |
| Featherweight | JP Reese | def. | Daniel Swain | Submission (arm-triangle choke) | 3 | 3:37 |
| Welterweight | Dominique Steele | def. | Ryan Thomas | Decision (unanimous) | 3 | 5:00 |

=== XFC International - Season 1 ===
==== XFC International 1: Meller vs. French ====
Took place on February 8, 2014 in São Paulo, Brazil

Main card
| Weight class | | | | Method | Round | Time | Notes |
|---|---|---|---|---|---|---|---|
| Lightweight | Thiago Meller | def. | Clay French | TKO (punches) | 1 | 3:39 |
| Featherweight | Fernando Vieira | def. | Marcelo Rojo | Submission (keylock) | 2 | 1:35 |
XFCI Lightweight Tournament Quarterfinals
| Weight class | | | | Method | Round | Time | Notes |
| Lightweight | Gilson Lomanto | def. | Daniel Salas | Decision (unanimous) | 3 | 5:00 |
| Lightweight | Glaucio Eliziario | def. | Jonathan Ortega | Decision (unanimous) | 3 | 5:00 |
| Lightweight | Natan Schulte | def. | Giovanni Arroyo | TKO (punches) | 3 | 2:26 |
| Lightweight | Alan Dos Santos | def. | Marcos Alderete | Technical Submission (Peruvian necktie) | 1 | 0:37 |
XFCI Women's Flyweight Tournament Semifinals
| Weight class | | | | Method | Round | Time | Notes |
| Women's Flyweight | Mayerlin Rivas | def. | Daiana Torquato | Decision (unanimous) | 3 | 5:00 |
| Women's Flyweight | Silvana Gómez Juárez | def. | Bianca Daimoni | Submission (armbar) | 3 | 4:49 |

==== XFC International 2: Alvaro vs. Nascimento ====
Took place on March 15, 2014 in São Paulo, Brazil

Main card
| Weight class | | | | Method | Round | Time | Notes |
|---|---|---|---|---|---|---|---|
| Lightweight | Flavio Alvaro | def. | Adson Lira Nascimento | Decision (unanimous) | 3 | 5:00 |
| Women's Strawweight | Kalindra Faria | def. | Aline Serio | Decision (unanimous) | 3 | 5:00 |
| Welterweight | Paulo Cesar | def. | Sergio Santos | Submission (triangle choke) | 1 | 3:35 |
XFCI Welterweight Tournament Quarterfinals
| Weight class | | | | Method | Round | Time | Notes |
| Welterweight | Pedro Junior | def. | Erick Montano | Submission (D'arce choke) | 2 | 4:00 |
| Welterweight | Cairo Rocha | def. | Maurilio Alava | Submission (arm triangle choke) | 1 | 1:55 |
| Welterweight | Will Galvao | def. | Elton Brown | Submission (rear naked choke) | 1 | 4:28 |
| Welterweight | Kevin Medinilla | def. | Alessandro Gambulino | Decision (unanimous) | 3 | 5:00 |
XFCI Featherweight Tournament Quarterfinals
| Weight class | | | | Method | Round | Time | Notes |
| Featherweight | Bruno Aquiles Canetti | def. | Luan Gazetta | Decision (unanimous) | 3 | 5:00 |
| Featherweight | Felipe Douglas | def. | Rodolfo Rubio Perez | Decision (split) | 3 | 5:00 |
| Featherweight | Alejandro Villalobos | def. | Missael Silva de Souza | TKO (punches) | 2 | 0:27 |
| Featherweight | Alex Kaspary Marrento | def. | Cesar Balanta | Submission (guillotine choke) | 3 | 2:39 |

==== XFC International 3: Santos vs. Morales ====
Took place on March 29, 2014 in São Paulo, Brazil

Main card
| Weight class | | | | Method | Round | Time | Notes |
|---|---|---|---|---|---|---|---|
| Welterweight | Luis Santos | def. | Alfredo Morales | KO (front kick) | 3 | 1:34 |
| Bantamweight | Allan Nascimento | def. | Matias Vasquez | Submission (armbar) | 3 | 4:20 |
XFCI Middleweight Tournament Quarterfinals
| Weight class | | | | Method | Round | Time | Notes |
| Middleweight | Thiago Rela | def. | Julio Cesar Cruz | Submission (armbar) | 1 | 0:52 |
| Middleweight | Christiano Frohlich | def. | Juan Villanueva | TKO (punches) | 1 | 3:35 |
| Middleweight | Miguel Angelo Gentilini | def. | Rosalio Medrano | TKO (punches) | 2 | 3:58 |
| Middleweight | Alberto Pereira Uda | def. | Wendres Carlos da Silva | Decision (unanimous) | 3 | 5:00 |
XFCI Women's Strawweight Tournament Semifinals
| Weight class | | | | Method | Round | Time | Notes |
| Women's Strawweight | Vanessa Guimaraes | def. | Marcela Yineris | Decision (split) | 3 | 5:00 |
| Women's Strawweight | Vanessa Melo | def. | Gloria Bravo | Decision (unanimous) | 3 | 5:00 |

==== XFC International 4: Dos Santos vs. Lowe ====
Took place on April 26, 2014 in São Paulo, Brazil

Main card
| Weight class | | | | Method | Round | Time | Notes |
|---|---|---|---|---|---|---|---|
| Featherweight | Marcos Dos Santos | def. | Waylon Lowe | No Contest | 3 | 5:00 |
| Women's Strawweight | Kalindra Faria | def. | Sanja Sucevic | Decision (unanimous) | 3 | 5:00 |
| Featherweight | Alejandro Villalobos | def. | Bruno Canetti | TKO (punches) | 1 | 4:09 | (Note: XFCI Featherweight Tournament Semi Final) |
XFCI Welterweight Tournament Semi Finals
| Weight class | | | | Method | Round | Time | Notes |
| Welterweight | Will Galvao | def. | Cairo Rocha | KO (head kick) | 1 | 0:12 |
| Welterweight | Kevin Medinilla | def. | Pedro Junior | Submission (armbar) | 2 | 2:11 |
XFCI Lightweight Tournament Semi Finals
| Weight class | | | | Method | Round | Time | Notes |
| Lightweight | Glaucio Eliziario | def. | Alan dos Santos | Decision (split) | 3 | 5:00 |
| Lightweight | Natan Schulte | def. | Gilson Lomanto | TKO (punches) | 1 | 4:28 |
XFCI Middleweight Tournament Semi Finals
| Weight class | | | | Method | Round | Time | Notes |
| Middleweight | Thiago Rela | def. | Miguel Gentilini | Submission (triangle choke) | 1 | 2:03 |
| Middleweight | Alberto Uda | def. | Christiano Frohlich | TKO (punches) | 2 | 2:49 |

==== XFC International 5: Solano vs. Assuncao ====
Took place on June 7, 2014, in São Paulo, Brazil

Main card
| Weight class | | | | Method | Round | Time | Notes |
|---|---|---|---|---|---|---|---|
| Featherweight | Junior Assuncao | def. | Alejandro Solano | Decision (unanimous) | 3 | 5:00 |
| Featherweight | Alejandro Villalobos | def. | Felipe Douglas | Submission (rear naked choke) | 3 | 2:57 | (Note: XFCI Featherweight Tournament Final) |
| Flyweight | Allan Nascimento | def. | Andre Lourenco | Submission (D'arce choke) | 1 | 3:03 |
| Middleweight | Alberto Uda | def. | Thiago Rela | Submission (triangle armbar) | 1 | 3:26 | (Note: XFCI Middleweight Tournament Final) |
| Lightweight | Natan Schulte | def. | Glaucio Eliziario | Decision (unanimous) | 3 | 5:00 | (Note: XFCI Lightweight Tournament Final) |
| Women's Flyweight | Silvana Gómez Juárez | def. | Mayerlin Rivas | Submission (armbar) | 3 | 2:55 | (Note: XFCI Women's Flyweight Tournament Final) |
| Welterweight | Cairo Rocha | def. | Paulo Cesar | Submission (triangle choke) | 1 | 4:08 |

==== Season 1 Tournament Winners ====
| Division | Upper weight limit | Champion | Won | Runner up |
|---|---|---|---|---|
| Middleweight | 185 lb (84 kg) | Alberto Uda | June 7, 2014 (XFCi 5) | Thiago Rela |
| Welterweight | 170 lb (77 kg) | Will Galvao | Due to Forfeit | Kevin Medinilla |
| Lightweight | 155 lb (70 kg) | Natan Schulte | June 7, 2014 (XFCi 5) | Glaucio Eliziario |
| Featherweight | 145 lb (66 kg) | Alejandro Villalobos | June 7, 2014 (XFCi 5) | Felipe Douglas |
| Women's Flyweight | 125 lb (57 kg) | Silvana Gómez Juárez | June 7, 2014 (XFCi 5) | Mayerlin Rivas |
| Women's Strawweight | 115 lb (52 kg) | Vanessa Guimaraes | September 27, 2014 (XFCi 6) | Vanessa Melo |

=== XFC International - Season 2 ===
==== XFC International 6: Ribeiro vs. Lowe ====
Took place on September 27, 2014, in Araraquara, Brazil

Main card
| Weight class | | | | Method | Round | Time | Notes |
|---|---|---|---|---|---|---|---|
| Featherweight | Deivison Ribeiro (c) | def. | Waylon Lowe | TKO (head kick & punches) | 4 | 0:11 | (Note: For the Featherweight Championship) |
| Women's Strawweight | Vanessa Guimaraes | def. | Vanessa Melo | Decision (split) | 3 | 5:00 | (Note: XFCI Women's Strawweight Tournament Final) |
| Welterweight | Alfredo Morales | def. | Marcelo Barreira | Submission (armbar) | 1 | N/A |
| Welterweight | Steven Newell | def. | Wesley do Nascimento | TKO | 3 | N/A |
XFCI Bantamweight Tournament Quarterfinals
| Weight class | | | | Method | Round | Time | Notes |
| Bantamweight | Garcia Cabello | def. | Julio Rodrigues | Decision (split) | 3 | 5:00 |
| Bantamweight | Alejandro Abomohor | def. | Luan Gazetta | KO (punch) | 1 | 0:27 |
| Bantamweight | Virginio Da Silva | def. | Lerryan Douglas | Submission (guillotine choke) | 1 | 3:22 |
| Bantamweight | David Gray Jr. | def. | Lucas Moraes | Submission (triangle choke) | 1 | N/A |
| Bantamweight | Diogo Sotero | def. | Diogo D'Avila | TKO (knees) | 2 | 2:02 | (Note: Reserve Bout) |
XFCI Women's Flyweight Tournament Quarterfinals
| Weight class | | | | Method | Round | Time | Notes |
| Women's Flyweight | Taila Santos | def. | Rachael Cummins | TKO (punches) | 1 | 4:28 |
| Women's Flyweight | Poliana Botelho | def. | Karina Rodriguez | KO (kick to the body) | 3 | 2:15 |
| Women's Flyweight | Debora Ferreira | def. | Julia Borisova | Decision (unanimous) | 3 | 5:00 |
| Women's Flyweight | Silvaneide Pereira | def. | Vuokko Katainen | Decision (split) | 3 | 5:00 |

==== XFC International 7: Nascimento vs. Abiltarov ====
Took place on November 1, 2014, in São Paulo, Brazil

Main card
| Weight class | | | | Method | Round | Time | Notes |
|---|---|---|---|---|---|---|---|
| Flyweight | Allan Nascimento | def. | Ruslan Abiltarov | Decision (unanimous) | 3 | 5:00 |
| Women's Flyweight | Julianna Werner | def. | Iryna Shaparenko | Submission (rear naked choke) | 2 | 2:09 |
| Lightweight | Willian Cilli | def. | Reinaldo Ekson | Submission (kneebar) | 2 | 0:50 |
XFCI Women's Strawweight Tournament Quarterfinals
| Weight class | | | | Method | Round | Time | Notes |
| Women's Strawweight | Liana Ferreira Pirosin | def. | Marcela Yineris | Decision (unanimous) | 3 | 5:00 |
| Women's Strawweight | Maryna Moroz | def. | Karine Silva | Submission (arm bar) | 1 | 3:27 |
| Women's Strawweight | Dora Perjes | def. | Luana Santos Medeiros | Submission (heel hoke) | 1 | 3:22 |
| Women's Strawweight | Viviane Pereira | def. | Fernanda Priscila Barros Pinheiro | TKO (punches) | 1 | 3:22 |
XFCI Welterweight Tournament Quarterfinals
| Weight class | | | | Method | Round | Time | Notes |
| Welterweight | Cairo Rocha | def. | Sergei Bal | Decision (unanimous) | 3 | 5:00 |
| Welterweight | Carlston Lindsay Harris | def. | Ariel Jaeger | Decision (unanimous) | 3 | 5:00 |
| Welterweight | Paulo Cesar Santos De Menezes Junior | def. | Anthony Suarez | Decision (split) | 3 | 5:00 |
| Welterweight | Michel Pereira | def. | Geraldo Coelho De Lima Neto | Submission (guillotine choke) | 1 | 2:40 |

==== XFC International 8: Nam vs. Vieira ====
Took place on December 13, 2014, in Clube Concordia - Campinas, Brazil

Main card
| Weight class | | | | Method | Round | Time | Notes |
|---|---|---|---|---|---|---|---|
| Bantamweight | Fernando Vieira | def. | Tyson Nam | Decision (unanimous) | 3 | 5:00 |
| Women's Flyweight | Silvana Gómez Juárez | def. | Vanessa Melo | Decision (unanimous) | 3 | 5:00 |
| Lightweight | Glaucio Eliziario | def. | Jay Furness | Decision (unanimous) | 3 | 5:00 |
XFCI Women's Flyweight Tournament Semifinals
| Weight class | | | | Method | Round | Time | Notes |
| Women's Flyweight | Antonia Silvaneide | def. | Debora Ferreira | Decision (unanimous) | 3 | 5:00 |
XFCI Featherweight Tournament Quarterfinals
| Weight class | | | | Method | Round | Time | Notes |
| Featherweight | Pedro Falcao | def. | Michael Stevens | Submission (armbar) | 1 | 1:06 |
| Featherweight | Ranfi Rivas | def. | Geovanny Arroyo | Decision (unanimous) | 3 | 5:00 |
| Featherweight | Guilherme Faria | def. | Carlos Torres | TKO (punches) | 1 | 3:35 |
| Featherweight | Missael Silva | def. | Paata Robakidze | Decision (unanimous) | 3 | 5:00 |
XFCI Lightweight Tournament Quarterfinals
| Weight class | | | | Method | Round | Time | Notes |
| Lightweight | Willian Cilli | def. | Henrique Barbosa | Submission (inverted omoplata) | 3 | 4:45 |
| Lightweight | Fernando dos Santos | def. | Michel Silva | Decision (unanimous) | 3 | 5:00 |
| Lightweight | Rubenilton Pereira | def. | Wilson dos Santos Fonseca | Decision (unanimous) | 3 | 5:00 |
| Lightweight | Hassan Badawy | def. | Alex Franco | TKO (punches) | 3 | 3:23 |

==== XFC International 9: Nascimento vs. Azevedo ====
Took place on March 14, 2015, in São Paulo, Brazil

Main card
| Weight class | | | | Method | Round | Time | Notes |
|---|---|---|---|---|---|---|---|
| Flyweight | Bruno Azevedo | def. | Allan Nascimento | Decision (unanimous) | 5 | 5:00 | (Note: For the XFC International Flyweight World Championship) |
| Women's Flyweight | Poliana Botelho | def. | Antonia Silvaneide | TKO | 1 | 1:36 | (Note: XFCI Women's Flyweight S2 Tournament Final) |
| Welterweight | Gennadiy Kovalev | def. | Will Galvao | Decision (unanimous) | 3 | 5:00 |
| Women's Flyweight | Julia Berezikova | def. | Juliana Werner | Submission (leg lock) | 2 | 1:35 |
| Lightweight | Natan Schulte | def. | Igor Egorov | Submission (rear naked choke) | 1 | 3:58 |
| Middleweight | Alberto Uda | def. | Boris Miroshnichenko | TKO (punches) | 3 | 1:56 |
XFCI Bantamweight Tournament Semifinals
| Weight class | | | | Method | Round | Time | Notes |
| Bantamweight | Daniel Virginio da Silva | def. | Julio Rodrigues | TKO (punches) | 1 | 4:46 |
| Bantamweight | James Gray | def. | Edgar Cabello | Submission (rear naked choke) | 1 | 1:34 |
XFCI Women's Strawweight Tournament Semifinals
| Weight class | | | | Method | Round | Time | Notes |
| Women's Strawweight | Viviane Pereira | def. | Liana Pirosin | Decision (unanimous) | 3 | 5:00 |
| Women's Strawweight | Vuokko Katainen | def. | Dora Perjes | Decision (unanimous) | 3 | 5:00 |
XFCI Welterweight Tournament Semifinals
| Weight class | | | | Method | Round | Time | Notes |
| Welterweight | Michel Pereira | def. | Cairo Rocha | Decision (unanimous) | 3 | 5:00 |
| Welterweight | Carlston Lindsay Harris | def. | Paulo Cesar dos Santos | Submission (d'arce choke) | 1 | 4:03 |

==== XFC International 10: Night of Champions ====
Took place on July 4, 2015, in São Paulo, Brazil

Main card
| Weight class | | | | Method | Round | Time | Notes |
|---|---|---|---|---|---|---|---|
| Bantamweight | Daniel Virginio da Silva | def. | James Gray | TKO (punches) | 1 | 3:59 | (Note: XFCI Bantamweight S2 Tournament Final) |
| Women's Strawweight | Viviane Pereira | def. | Vuokko Katainen | Decision (unanimous) | 3 | 5:00 | (Note: XFCI Women's Strawweight S2 Tournament Final) |
XFCI Lightweight Tournament Semifinals
| Weight class | | | | Method | Round | Time | Notes |
| Lightweight | Fernando dos Santos | def. | Rubenilton Pereira | Decision (unanimous) | 3 | 5:00 |
| Lightweight | William Cilli | def. | Mohamad Hassan Badawy | Submission (rear naked choke) | 1 | 4:13 |
XFCI Featherweight Tournament Semifinals
| Weight class | | | | Method | Round | Time | Notes |
| Featherweight | Missael Silva | def. | Pedro Falcao | Decision (unanimous) | 3 | 5:00 |
| Featherweight | Guilherme Faria | def. | Ranfi Rivas | Decision (unanimous) | 3 | 5:00 |

==== Season 2 Tournament Winners ====
| Division | Upper weight limit | Champion | Won | Runner up |
|---|---|---|---|---|
| Welterweight | 170 lb (77 kg) | Carlston Harris | November 28, 2015 (XFCi 12) | Michel Pereira |
| Lightweight | 155 lb (70 kg) | Willian Cilli | Sept 19, 2015 (XFCi 11) | Fernando dos Santos |
| Featherweight | 145 lb (66 kg) | Guilherme Faria | Sept 19, 2015 (XFCi 11) | Missael Silva |
| Bantamweight | 135 lb (61 kg) | Daniel Virginio da Silva | July 4, 2015 (XFCi 10) | James Gray |
| Women's Flyweight | 125 lb (57 kg) | Poliana Botelho | March 14, 2015 (XFCi 9) | Antonia Silvaneide |
| Women's Strawweight | 115 lb (52 kg) | Viviane Pereira | July 4, 2015 (XFCi 10) | Vuokko Katainen |

=== XFC International - Season 3 ===
==== XFC International 11: Botelho vs. Gomez ====
Took place on September 19, 2015, in São Paulo, Brazil

Main card
| Weight class | | | | Method | Round | Time | Notes |
|---|---|---|---|---|---|---|---|
| Women's Flyweight | Poliana Botelho | def. | Silvana Gómez Juárez | TKO (retirement) | 4 | 5:00 | (Note: XFCI Women's Flyweight Championship) |
| Lightweight | Willian Cilli | def. | Fernando dos Santos | Submission (guillotine choke) | 1 | 1:27 | (Note: XFCI Lightweight S2 Tournament Final) |
| Featherweight | Guilherme Faria | def. | Missael Silva | TKO (punch) | 1 | 1:03 | (Note: XFCI Featherweight S2 Tournament Final) |
XFCI Women's Strawweight Tournament Quarterfinals
| Weight class | | | | Method | Round | Time | Notes |
| Women's Strawweight | Marilia Santos | def. | Kate da Silva | Decision (unanimous) | 3 | 5:00 |
| Women's Strawweight | Sheila Gaff | def. | Antonia Silvaneide | Submission (armbar) | 1 | 4:46 |
XFCI Lightweight Tournament Quarterfinals
| Weight class | | | | Method | Round | Time | Notes |
| Lightweight | Cleiton Silva | def. | Weslle Pereira | TKO (punches) | 2 | 1:27 |
| Lightweight | Jefferson Rodrigues | def. | Ezequiel Eyaralar | Decision (unanimous) | 3 | 5:00 |
XFCI Women's Flyweight Tournament Quarterfinals
| Weight class | | | | Method | Round | Time | Notes |
| Women's Flyweight | Ilara Joanne | def. | Julia Borisova | TKO (punches) | 1 | 2:24 |
XFCI Flyweight Tournament Quarterfinals
| Weight class | | | | Method | Round | Time | Notes |
| Flyweight | Denis Oliveira | def. | Jose Vagno Soares | Decision (unanimous) | 3 | 5:00 |
| Flyweight | Rogerio Bontorin | def. | Israel Silva Lima | Submission (heel hoke) | 1 | 1:20 |

==== XFC International 12: Harris vs. Pereira ====
Took place on November 28, 2015, in São Paulo, Brazil

Main card
| Weight class | | | | Method | Round | Time | Notes |
|---|---|---|---|---|---|---|---|
| Welterweight | Carlston Harris | def. | Michel Pereira | Decision (unanimous) | 3 | 5:00 | (Note: XFCI Welterweight S2 Tournament Final) |
| Women's Strawweight | Viviane Pereira | def. | Vanessa Guimaraes | Submission (armbar) | 3 | | (Note: Vacant XFCI Women's Strawweight Championship) |
| Lightweight | Ricardo Tirloni | def. | Jadison Costa | TKO (punches) | 2 |
| Flyweight | Jose Maria Tome | def. | Marcel Adur | Decision (unanimous) | 3 | 5:00 |
| Welterweight | Luis Melo | def. | Vitor Regis | TKO (kick to the head) | 1 |
| Women's Flyweight | Vanessa Melo | def. | Molly McCann | Decision (unanimous) | 3 | 5:00 |
| Welterweight | Gian Siqueira | def. | Wellington Turman | Decision (unanimous) | 3 | 5:00 |
XFCI Lightweight Tournament Quarterfinals
| Weight class | | | | Method | Round | Time | Notes |
| Lightweight | Luciano Palhano | def. | Antonio Paulo | Decision (unanimous) | 3 | 5:00 |
| Lightweight | Ary Santos | def. | Daniel Oliveira | Decision (unanimous) | 3 | 5:00 |
XFCI Flyweight Tournament Quarterfinals
| Weight class | | | | Method | Round | Time | Notes |
| Flyweight | Pedro Chalita | def. | Jimmy Martinez Vela | Submission (rear naked choke) | 1 |
XFCI Women's Flyweight Tournament Quarterfinals
| Weight class | | | | Method | Round | Time | Notes |
| Women's Flyweight | Daniela Maria da Silva | def. | Hellen Bastos | Decision (unanimous) | 3 | 5:00 |

==== XFC International 13: Assuncao vs. Dos Santos Jr. ====
Took place on December 5, 2015, in São Paulo, Brazil

Main card
| Weight class | | | | Method | Round | Time | Notes |
|---|---|---|---|---|---|---|---|
| Featherweight | Junior Assuncao | def. | M. dos Santos Jr. | TKO | 2 | 3:51 |
| Welterweight | Alberto Uda | def. | Thiago Perpetuo | TKO (knee) | 1 | 2:19 |
| Bantamweight | Rafael Silva | def. | J. Vieira da Silva | Submission (armbar) | 2 | 1:25 |
| Welterweight | Antonio Trocoli | def. | Wendell Oliveira | Decision (unanimous) | 3 | 5:00 |

==== XFC International 14: Virginio vs. Vieira ====
Was supposed to take place on May 28, 2016, in São Paulo, Brazil, but was cancelled, and Season 3 championships were not awarded.

=== XFC 43 ===
Took place on November 11, 2020 in Atlanta, Georgia, US

Main card
| Weight class | | | | Method | Round | Time | Notes |
|---|---|---|---|---|---|---|---|
| Bantamweight | Andre Soukhamthath | def. | Guilherme Faria | Decision (split) (27–30, 29–28, 29–28) | 3 | 5:00 |
| Women's Strawweight | Danielle Taylor | def. | Jessica Aguilar | Decision (split) (29–28, 28–29, 29–28) | 3 | 5:00 |
XFC Lightweight Tournament Quarterfinals
| Weight class | | | | Method | Round | Time | Notes |
| Lightweight | Kenneth Cross | def. | Jarel Askew | TKO (strikes) | 2 | 3:00 |
| Lightweight | Kurt Holobaugh | def. | Joziro Boye | TKO (strikes) | 1 | 0:26 |
| Lightweight | Scott Hudson | def. | D'Juan Owens | Decision (unanimous) (30–27, 30–27, 30–27) | 3 | 5:00 |
| Lightweight | Tom O’Connor | def. | Jose Caceres | TKO (strikes) | 3 | 2:00 |
XFC Welterweight Tournament Quarterfinals
| Weight class | | | | Method | Round | Time | Notes |
| Welterweight | LaRue Burley | def. | Alex Sanchez | Submission (guillotine choke) | 3 | 4:21 |
| Welterweight | Carson Hardman | def. | Steven Newell | TKO (strikes) | 1 | 2:12 |
| Welterweight | Ryan Dickson | def. | Mike Hill | Submission (rear-naked choke) | 1 | 0:54 |
| Welterweight | Bobby Nash | def. | Spencer Jebb | TKO (strikes) | 1 | 3:36 |
XFC YoungGuns
| Weight class | | | | Method | Round | Time | Notes |
| Bantamweight | Austin Bashi | def. | Enzo Perez | Decision (unanimous) (30–27, 30–27, 30–27) | 3 | 5:00 |
| Welterweight | Luis Conde-Navarro | def. | Nicholas Horton | TKO (ground & pound) | 1 | 4:37 |

=== XFC 44 ===
Took place on May 28, 2021, in Des Moines, Iowa, US

Main card
| Weight class | | | | Method | Round | Time | Notes |
|---|---|---|---|---|---|---|---|
| Bantamweight | Jose Alberto Quinonez | def. | Andre Soukhamthath | Decision (unanimous) | 3 | 5:00 |
| Heavyweight | Brett Martin | def. | Marino Eatman | Decision (unanimous) | 3 | 5:00 |
XFC Lightweight Tournament Semifinals
| Weight class | | | | Method | Round | Time | Notes |
| Lightweight | Kurt Holobaugh | def. | Jose Luis Verdugo | KO (punch) | 2 | 0:11 | (Note: Verdugo replaced Scott Hudson in the Tournament) |
| Lightweight | Damonte Robinson | def. | Tom O'Connor | Decision (unanimous) | 3 | 5:00 | (Note: Robinson replaced Kenneth Cross in the Tournament) |
XFC Welterweight Tournament Semifinals
| Weight class | | | | Method | Round | Time | Notes |
| Welterweight | Bobby Nash | def. | Ryan Dickson | TKO (punches) | 1 | 3:00 |
| Welterweight | LaRue Burley | def. | Bradley Desir | TKO (punches) | 3 | 3:14 | (Note: Desir replaced Carson Hardman in the Tournament) |
XFC YoungGuns
| Weight class | | | | Method | Round | Time | Notes |
| Bantamweight | Austin Bashi | def. | Emanuel Pugh | Decision (unanimous) | 3 | 5:00 |

=== XFC 45 ===
Took place on August 6, 2021, in Grand Rapids, Michigan, US

Main card
| Weight class | | | | Method | Round | Time | Notes |
|---|---|---|---|---|---|---|---|
| Featherweight | Guilherme Faria | def. | Daron Cruickshank | Decision (split) | 3 | 5:00 |
| Welterweight | Bobby Nash | def. | Quinton Parks Jr. | Submission (rear-naked choke) | 1 | 2:08 |
| Bantamweight | Austin Bashi | def. | James Dunn | Decision (unanimous) | 3 | 5:00 |
| Lightweight | Dennis Hughes | def. | Davi Young | TKO (strikes) | 2 | 1:52 |
| Welterweight | Jett Grande | vs. | Damon Morosko | Draw (majority) | 3 | 5:00 |
| Featherweight | Matheus Camilo | def. | Darnell White Jr. | TKO (punches) | 1 | 2:28 |

=== XFC 46 ===
Scheduled on January 28, 2022, in US

Main card
| Weight class | | | | Method | Round | Time | Notes |
XFC Lightweight Tournament Final
| Weight class | | | | Method | Round | Time | Notes |
|---|---|---|---|---|---|---|---|
| Lightweight | Kurt Holobaugh | vs. | Damonte Robinson |

=== XFC Detroit Grand Prix ===
Took place on June 2, 2023, in Detroit, Michigan, US

Main card
| Weight class | | | | Method | Round | Time | Notes |
|---|---|---|---|---|---|---|---|
| Catchweight 147 lb | Guilherme Faria | def. | Olivier Murad | Decision (unanimous) | 3 | 5:00 |
| Catchweight 195 lb | Josh Mercado | def. | Louis Brewington | Decision (unanimous) | 3 | 5:00 |
| Lightweight | Stanley Dorsainvil | def. | Joao Guerra | Submission (guillotine choke) | 1 | 1:00 |
| Catchweight 150 lb | Nelton Marsh | vs. | Zak Flessas | No Contest |
| Heavyweight | John Lopez | def. | Matt Lagou | TKO (strikes) | 1 | 0:41 |

=== XFC 50 ===
Took place on April 12, 2024 in Lakeland, Florida.

Main card
| Weight class | | | | Method | Round | Time | Notes |
|---|---|---|---|---|---|---|---|
| Heavyweight | Tim Johnson | def. | Darion Abbey | KO (punches) | 1 | 1:42 |
| Bantamweight | Pearl Gonzalez | def. | Monica Medina | Submission (armbar) | 1 | 1:51 |
| Strawweight | Hannah Goldy | def. | Tayde Garcia | Submission (armbar) | 2 | 4:58 |
| Lightweight | Emmanuel Sanchez | def. | Daniel Salas | Decision (unanimous) | 3 | 5:00 |
Preliminary card
| Weight class | | | | Method | Round | Time | Notes |
| Middleweight | Thomas Lane | def. | Dylan O'Sullivan | Submission (rear-naked choke) | 1 | 1:22 |
| Strawweight | Kayla Stricker | def. | Rebekah Rotenberry | Decision (split) | 3 | 5:00 |
| Featherweight | Juan Alvarez | def. | Dallas Manspile | TKO (punches) | 1 | 3:00 |
| Flyweight | Markevian Williams | def. | Yancarlos Guerra | Decision (unanimous) | 3 | 5:00 |

=== XFC: Detroit Grand Prix 2 ===
Took place on May 31, 2024 in Detroit, Michigan.

Main card
| Weight class | | | | Method | Round | Time | Notes |
|---|---|---|---|---|---|---|---|
| Heavyweight | Alex Nicholson | def. | Carl Seumanutafa | KO/TKO (elbow to ground punches) | 1 | 4:09 |
| Bantamweight | Rainn Guerrero | def. | Pearl Gonzalez | Decision (unanimous) | 3 | 5:00 |
| Lightweight | Dan Moret | def. | Raush Manfio | Submission (rear-naked choke) | 1 | 0:59 |
| Heavyweight | Zac Pauga | def. | Jamahl Tatum | Submission (arm triangle choke) | 1 | 2:43 |
| Flyweight | Viviane Pereira | def. | DeAnna Bennett | Submission (mounted guillotine choke) | 1 | 1:50 |
| Catchweight 175 lb | Handesson Ferreira | def. | Tyler Hill | Submission (rear-naked choke) | 1 | 3:32 |
| Welterweight | Egor Kostyuchenko | def. | Perry Stargel | Decision (unanimous) | 3 | 5:00 |
Preliminary card
| Weight class | | | | Method | Round | Time | Notes |
| Catchweight 162 lb | Kenneth Cross | def. | Emilio Chavez | Submission (armbar) | 2 | 1:17 |
| Heavyweight | Von Simons | def. | Chad Finnerty | KO/TKO (leg kick to ground strikes) | 1 | 0:32 |

=== XFC 51: Evolution ===
Took place on September 27, 2024 in Milwaukee, Wisconsin.

Main card
| Weight class | | | | Method | Round | Time | Notes |
|---|---|---|---|---|---|---|---|
| Heavyweight | Alex Nicholson | def. | Zac Pauga | KO/TKO (strikes) | 2 | 1:16 |
| Welterweight | Dilano Taylor | def. | Handesson Ferreira | Submission (rear-naked choke) | 1 | 1:05 |
| Lightweight | Kenneth Cross | def. | Emmanuel Sanchez | Decision (unanimous) | 3 | 5:00 |
| Lightweight | Sidney Outlaw | def. | Dan Moret | Technical submission (rear-naked choke) | 1 | 1:07 |
| Catchweight 130 lb | Rayla Nascimento | def. | Viviane Pereira | Decision (unanimous) | 3 | 5:00 |
| Heavyweight | Ronny Markes | def. | Lawrence Phillips | KO/TKO (strikes) | 1 | 1:29 |
| Lightweight | Artur Minev | def. | Brandon Evans | Submission (guillotine choke) | 1 | 3:29 |

=== XFC Young Guns 5 ===
Took place on February 12, 2025 in Deerfield Beach, Florida.

Main card
| Weight class | | | | Method | Round | Time | Notes |
|---|---|---|---|---|---|---|---|
| Lightweight | Apollo Gomes | def. | Jesus Ru | KO/TKO (punches) | 3 | 1:59 |
| Catchweight 160 lb | Ansar Khamzaev | def. | Leonardo Guzman | Submission (Kimura) | 1 | 2:53 |

=== XFC Young Guns 6 ===
Took place on February 26, 2025 in Deerfield Beach, Florida.

Main card
| Weight class | | | | Method | Round | Time | Notes |
|---|---|---|---|---|---|---|---|
| Flyweight | Yve Nelson | def. | Pablo Andaur Ramos | Decision (unanimous) | 3 | 5:00 |
| Welterweight | Andrija Stankovic | def. | Gerardo Fariña | KO/TKO (punches) | 2 | 3:17 |
| Lightweight | Jimmy Washington | def. | Joseph Pernal | KO/TKO (punches) | 1 | 0:27 |

=== XFC 52: The Awakening ===
Took place on March 28, 2025 in Iowa City, Iowa.

Main card
| Weight class | | | | Method | Round | Time | Notes |
|---|---|---|---|---|---|---|---|
| Lightweight | Kenneth Cross | def. | Lucas Corbage | KO/TKO (straight left to ground strikes) | 1 | 0:14 |
| Heavyweight | Darion Abbey | def. | Alex Nicholson | KO/TKO (punches) | 1 | 1:17 |
| Catchweight 218 lb | Emiliano Sordi | def. | Marcos Brigagão | KO/TKO (punches) | 1 | 1:27 |
| Middleweight | Victor Moreno | def. | Thiago Oliveira | Submission (rear-naked choke) | 1 | 3:43 |
| Catchweight 140 lb | Saidyokub Kakhramonov | def. | Bruno Santos | Decision (unanimous) | 3 | 5:00 |
| Flyweight | Jaron Lathrop | def. | Yevgeni Shinkarevsky | KO/TKO (jumping spin kick to ground punches) | 1 | 4:22 |
| Light heavyweight | Erik Johnson | def. | Austin Climer | KO/TKO (strikes) | 1 | 1:08 |

=== XFC Young Guns 7 & 8 ===
Took place on April 30, 2025 in Deerfield Beach, Florida.

Main card
| Weight class | | | | Method | Round | Time | Notes |
|---|---|---|---|---|---|---|---|
| Welterweight | Christopher Alvidrez | def. | Takashi Sato | KO/TKO (strikes) | 1 | 4:56 |
| Flyweight | Luis Perez | def. | Yve Nelson | Decision (split) | 3 | 5:00 |
| Featherweight | Matt Wagy | def. | Andres Cordero Cordova | KO/TKO (strikes) | 1 | 1:33 |
| Lightweight | Maurice Morrison | def. | Hernandez Banks | Submission (rear-naked choke) | 2 | 3:21 |
| Flyweight | Takaya Suzuki | def. | Gabriel Bellomini | KO/TKO (strikes) | 1 | 2:54 |
| Catchweight 170 lb | Emiliano Calderón | def. | Franklin Torres | Submission (arm triangle choke) | 2 | 2:26 |
| Featherweight | Gloria Dacosta | def. | Simone da Silva | KO/TKO (strikes) | 2 | 1:45 |
| Heavyweight | Dai'kwon Fuse | def. | Cody Cox | KO/TKO (strikes) | 1 | 3:12 |
| Catchweight 170 lb | Luis Hernandez | def. | Joaquin Campos | Submission (rear-naked choke) | 1 | 2:52 |
| Catchweight 148 lb | EJ Hernandez | def. | Israel Hernandez | Decision (unanimous) | 3 | 5:00 |

=== XFC Young Guns 9 & 10 ===
Took place on June 25, 2025 in Deerfield Beach, Florida.

Main card
| Weight class | | | | Method | Round | Time | Notes |
|---|---|---|---|---|---|---|---|
| Catchweight 130 lb | Jarret Betancourt | def. | Jayson Scott | KO/TKO (punches) | 1 | 4:33 |
| Heavyweight | Anthony Wint | def. | Emmanuel Verdier | KO/TKO (punches) | 3 | 4:02 |
| Lightweight | Jimmy Washington | def. | Marcellus Wallace | Decision (unanimous) | 3 | 5:00 |
| Catchweight 150 lb | Shane Mistretta | def. | Jason Valle | KO/TKO (punches) | 1 | 3:02 |
| Featherweight | Tial Thang | def. | Michael Tovar | Decision (unanimous) | 3 | 5:00 |
| Flyweight | Pablo Andaur Ramos | def. | Israel Henry | Submission (guillotine choke) | 3 | 4:14 |
| Catchweight 179 lb | Greg Sun | def. | Rashad Lockhart | Submission (armbar) | 1 | 0:32 |
| Bantamweight | Irvin Enriquez | def. | Maximiliano Sandoval | Submission (rear-naked choke) | 1 | 1:04 |
| Catchweight 165 lb | Devin Lee | def. | Fernando Valdes | KO/TKO (punches) | 2 | 4:54 |

=== XFC Live! (cancelled) ===
Took place on July 11, 2025 in Pittsburgh, Pennsylvania. The event was cancelled and no bouts took place.

=== BORROKA Presents XFC 53 ===
BORROKA Presents XFC 53
- Promotion: Xtreme Fighting Championships
- Date: September 20, 2025
- Venue: Virgin Hotels Las Vegas
- City: Las Vegas, Nevada, United States

Main card
| Weight class | | | | Method | Round | Time | Notes |
|---|---|---|---|---|---|---|---|
| Featherweight | Juan Archuleta (c) | def. | Jose Johnson | Submission (rear-naked choke) | 2 | 2:31 | (Note: For the Borroka Featherweight Championship.) |
| Women's Flyweight | Taylor Mauldin | def. | Elizabeth Rodriguez | Submission (face crank) | 2 | 3:39 |
| Welterweight | Darkhanbek Egershov | def. | Ray Cooper III | Submission (rear-naked choke) | 2 | 3:04 |
| Catchweight (140 lb) | Xavier Franklin | vs. | Magerrem Gasanazde | Draw (majority) (29–28, 28–28, 28–28) | 3 | 5:00 |
| Bantamweight | Islam Abazaliev | def. | Nika Sabanashvili | Decision (majority) (28–28, 29–28, 29–28) | 3 | 5:00 |
Preliminary card
| Flyweight | Luis Perez | def. | Jason Shaner | KO (punch and head kick) | 1 | 1:17 |
| Welterweight | Kris Jennings | def. | Sebastian Mordecai | TKO (punches and elbows) | 3 | 2:15 |

== Current champions ==
| Division | Upper weight limit | Champion | Since | Title Defenses | Next Fight |
|---|---|---|---|---|---|
| Welterweight | 170 lb (77 kg) | Vacant | | | |
| Lightweight | 155 lb (70 kg) | Vacant | | | |
| Featherweight | 145 lb (66 kg) | Vacant | | | |
| Bantamweight | 135 lb (61 kg) | Vacant | | | |
| Flyweight | 125 lb (57 kg) | Vacant | | | |
| Women's Flyweight | 125 lb (57 kg) | Vacant | | | |
| Women's Strawweight | 115 lb (52 kg) | Vacant | | | |

== Title history ==
=== Lightweight Championship ===
146 to 155 lbs (66 to 70 kg)

| No. | Name | Event | Date | Defenses |
|---|---|---|---|---|
| 1 | (United States) John Mahlow def. Eben Oroz | XFC 4: Judgement in the Cage; Tampa, FL, United States | June 28, 2008 | 1. def. Luis Palomino at XFC 6: Clash of the Continents on December 5, 2008 |
| 2 | (Brazil) Júnior Assunção | XFC 10: Night of Champions; Tampa, FL, United States | March 19, 2010 | |
Assuncao vacated the title when he signed with the UFC.
| 3 | (United States) Nick Newell def. Eric Reynolds | XFC 21: Night of Champions II; Nashville, TN, United States | December 7, 2012 | |
Newell was stripped the title on May 10th, 2013 when he refused to defend it against Scott Holtzman.
| 4 | (United States) Scott Holtzman def. John Mahlow | XFC 24: Collision Course; Tampa, Florida, United States | June 14, 2013 | 1. def. Roger Carroll at XFC 26: Night of Champions III on October 18, 2013 |
Holtzman vacated the title on August 14, 2014, when he signed with the UFC.

=== Featherweight Championship ===
136 to 145 lbs (61 to 66 kg)

| No. | Name | Event | Date | Defenses |
|---|---|---|---|---|
| 1 | (United States) Jarrod Card def. Bruce Connors | XFC 8: Regional Conflict; Knoxville, TN, United States | April 25, 2009 | 1. def. Jason Wood at XFC 10: Night of Champions on March 19, 2010 |
| 2 | (Peru) Luis Palomino | XFC 13: Unstoppable; Tampa, FL, United States | December 3, 2010 | |
Palomino vacated title when he signed with Bellator.
| 3 | (Brazil) Deivison Ribeiro def. Farkhad Sharipov | XFC 27: Frozen Fury; Muskegon, Michigan, United States | December 13, 2013 | def. Waylon Lowe at XFCi 6 on September 27, 2014 |
Ribeiro was stripped of the title when he was released by the organization.

=== Bantamweight Championship ===
126 to 135 lbs (57 to 61 kg)

| No. | Name | Event | Date | Defenses |
|---|---|---|---|---|
| 1 | (United Kingdom) Jason Goodall def. Haender Rodriguez | XFC 6: Clash of the Continents; Tampa, FL, United States | December 5, 2008 | |
| 2 | (United States) Pablo Alfonso | XFC 9: Evolution; Tampa, FL, United States | September 5, 2009 | |
Alfonso vacated title when he signed with Strikeforce.

=== Flyweight Championship ===
116 to 125 lb (53 to 57 kg)

| No. | Name | Event | Date | Defenses |
|---|---|---|---|---|
| 1 | (Brazil) Bruno Azevedo def. Allan Nascimento | XFCI 9: Nascimento vs. Azevedo; São Paulo, Brazil | March 14, 2015 | |
Azevedo was stripped of the title when he signed with Shooto Brasil.

=== Women's Flyweight Championship ===
116 to 125 lbs

| No. | Name | Event | Date | Defenses |
|---|---|---|---|---|
| 1 | (United States) Pearl Gonzalez def. Cortney Casey | XFC 26: Night of Champions III; Nashville, Tennessee, United States | October 18, 2013 | |
Gonzalez was stripped of the title when she was released by the organization.
| 2 | (Brazil) Poliana Botelho def. Silvana Gómez Juárez | XFCi 11: Botelho vs. Gomez; São Paulo, Brazil | September 19, 2015 | |
| Botelho vacated the title on May 03, 2016 when she signed with the UFC. | | | | |

=== Women's Strawweight Championship ===
106 to 115 lbs

| No. | Name | Event | Date | Defenses |
|---|---|---|---|---|
| 1 | (United States) Stephanie Eggink def. Angela Magaña | XFC 25: Boiling Point; Albuquerque, New Mexico, United States | September 6, 2013 | |
Eggink vacated the title when she was released by the organization.
| 2 | (Brazil) Viviane Pereira def. Vanessa Guimaraes | XFC i 12: Harris vs. Pereira; São Paulo, Brazil | November 28, 2015 | |
Pereira vacated the title on December 10, 2016 when she signed with the UFC.

== Media coverage ==
| Region | Broadcaster |
|---|---|
| United States | NBC Sports; Telemundo Deportes |
| Brazil | Combate |
| Mexico | Imagen Televisión |
| Paraguay; Central America | Tigo Sports |
| Ukraine | X-Sport |
| Vietnam | FPT |
| Latin America | TV Azteca |
| Worldwide (streaming) | FITE TV |
