= Stephanie Eggink =

American mixed martial artist (born 1988)

- Born: July 12, 1988 (age 38); Bellingham, Washington, U.S.
- Other names: Snowflake
- Height: 5 ft 8 in (1.73 m)
- Weight: 114 lb (52 kg; 8.1 st)
- Division: Strawweight (115 lb); Flyweight (125 lb) (Amateur)
- Reach: 68 in (170 cm)
- Fighting out of: Miami, Florida, United States
- Team: Gracie Tampa
- Years active: 2011–present

Mixed martial arts record
- Total: 7
- Wins: 4
- By submission: 2
- By decision: 2
- Losses: 3
- By knockout: 2
- By submission: 1

Amateur record
- Total: 4
- Wins: 3
- By knockout: 1
- By submission: 1
- By decision: 1
- Losses: 1
- By decision: 1

Other information
- Mixed martial arts record from Sherdog

Stephanie Eggink (born July 12, 1988) is an American mixed martial artist, who currently competes in the Strawweight division of the all-female promotion Invicta FC. A professional competitor since 2011, Eggink holds a record of 4–3, and is the former XFC Strawweight Champion.

== Mixed martial arts career ==
=== Amateur career ===
Eggink had her first amateur mixed martial arts bout on July 2, 2010, when she faced Jillian Lybarger at Tuff-N-Uff: Tough Girls. She won the bout via third round triangle choke. Following this, Eggink would go 3–1 as an amateur, and also unsuccessfully challenged for the Amateur Tuff-N-Uff Flyweight Championship, losing the championship bout against Jenny Yum via split decision. She would turn professional in early 2011. In March 2012, she suffered a humiliating loss to steroid lab experiment Kaline Medeiros after getting knocked out just seven seconds into the fight. Eggink suffered a Level 4 concussion and was unable to create new memories for a day.

=== Xtreme Fighting Championships ===
After a 1–1 stint on the regional circuit, Eggink signed with Florida based promotion Xtreme Fighting Championships. Eggink faced Heather Clark in her debut at XFC 21: Night of Champions 2 on December 7, 2012. She won the fight via unanimous decision.

In her second bout with the promotion, Eggink faced Brianna Van Buren at XFC 23: Louisville Slugfest on April 19, 2013. She won the fight via unanimous decision.

For her next bout in the promotion, she challenged Angela Magaña for the XFC Strawweight Championship at XFC 25: Boiling Point on September 6, 2013. She won the championship fight via second round triangle choke.

=== Invicta FC ===
Following her impressive championship win, Eggink would vacate the XFC Strawweight Championship and subsequently signed with the all-female promotion Invicta FC. She faced Katja Kankaanpää for the vacant Strawweight Championship at Invicta FC 8: Waterson vs. Tamada on September 6, 2014. Eggink lost the bout via fifth round D'Arce choke, and both fighters would earn Fight of the Night honors for their efforts.

Eggink was expected to face Alexa Grasso at Invicta FC 16: Hamasaki vs. Brown on March 11, 2016. Grasso withdrew with an injury on March 2 and was replaced by Angela Hill. She lost the fight by a second-round technical knockout.

== Championships and accomplishments ==
=== Mixed martial arts ===
- Invicta Fighting Championships
  - Fight of the Night (One time) vs. Katja Kankaanpää
- Xtreme Fighting Championships
  - XFC Strawweight Championship (One time)

== Mixed martial arts record ==
Professional record breakdown
7 matches	4 wins	3 losses
By knockout	0	2
By submission	2	1
By decision	2	0
Draws	0	
No contests	0	

Res.	Record	Opponent	Method	Event	Date	Round	Time	Location	Notes
Loss	4–3	Angela Hill	TKO (punch)	Invicta FC 16: Hamasaki vs. Brown	March 11, 2016	2	2:36	Las Vegas, Nevada, United States	
Loss	4–2	Katja Kankaanpää	Submission (D'Arce choke)	Invicta FC 8: Waterson vs. Tamada	September 6, 2014	5	2:03	Kansas City, Missouri, United States	For the vacant Invicta FC Strawweight Championship. Fight of the Night.
Win	4–1	Angela Magaña	Submission (triangle choke)	XFC 25: Boiling Point	September 6, 2013	2	3:10	Albuquerque, New Mexico, United States	Won the XFC Strawweight Championship.
Win	3–1	Brianna Van Buren	Decision (unanimous)	XFC 23: Louisville Slugfest	April 19, 2013	3	5:00	Louisville, Kentucky, United States	
Win	2–1	Heather Clark	Decision (unanimous)	XFC 21 - Night of Champions 2	December 7, 2012	3	5:00	Nashville, Tennessee, United States	
Loss	1–1	Kaline Medeiros	KO (punch)	EB: Beatdown at 4 Bears 10	March 21, 2012	1	0:07	New Town, North Dakota, United States	
Win	1–0	Trisha Clark	Submission (armbar)	Crowbar MMA: Rumble at the Fair	June 25, 2011	1	2:21	Grand Forks, North Dakota, United States	
