= Katja Kankaanpää =

Finnish mixed martial artist (born 1981)

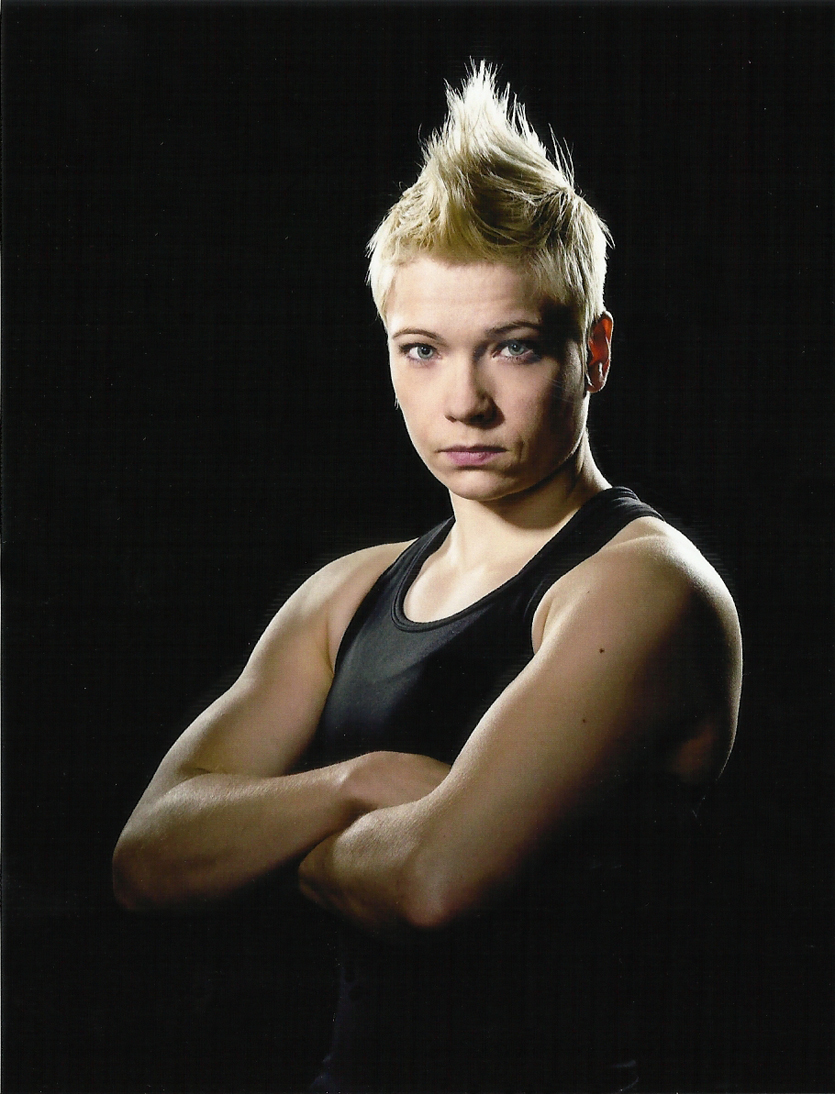
- Born: Katja Kalliokoski; June 30, 1981 (age 45); Seinäjoki, Southern Ostrobothnia, Finland
- Other names: Killer Bunny
- Nationality: Finnish
- Height: 5 ft 4 in (1.63 m)
- Weight: 115 lb (52 kg; 8 st 3 lb)
- Division: Strawweight
- Team: MMA Seinajoki / Team Botnia Punishment
- Trainer: Marcelo Giudici, Jarkko Latomäki
- Rank: Purple belt in BJJ
- Years active: 2010–2015

Mixed martial arts record
- Total: 14
- Wins: 10
- By knockout: 1
- By submission: 4
- By decision: 5
- Losses: 3
- By submission: 1
- By decision: 2
- Draws: 1

Other information
- Mixed martial arts record from Sherdog

Katja Kankaanpää (Finnish: [ˈkɑtjɑ ˈkɑŋkɑːmpæː]; born June 30, 1981) is a Finnish former mixed martial artist who competed in the strawweight division. She is a former Invicta FC Strawweight Champion. Kankaanpää started martial arts training in her teens when she was 15 years old with Goju-ryu karate. Later, she had interest about combat sports by training submission wrestling and other disciplines. In addition to her career in MMA, she competed in submission wrestling and Brazilian jiu-jitsu tournaments.

== Mixed martial arts career ==
=== Early career ===
Her debut fight against Paulina Suska at Oulu Fight 2, was won by unanimous decision. In her next three fights versus Dalia Grakulskyte, Niina Aaltonen and Ekaterina Tarnavskaja Kankaanpää was able to achieve an untimely victory by submission or TKO. The next five fights went the whole distance with four unanimous decision wins against Karla Benitez, Mei Yamaguchi, Aisling Daly and Juliana Carneiro Lima. Only against Simona Soukupova she fought to a split draw. On May 17, 2014, Katja returned to the cage at Lappeenranta Fight Night 10 in Finland where she defeated Ukrainian Alyona Rassohyna via submission in round 2. This fight took place outside her InvictaFC contract.

=== Invicta Fighting Championships ===
According to her manager, Kankaanpää took the fight against Daly in Cage Warriors to get Invicta's attention. Kankaanpää was offered a contract with Invicta Fighting Championships immediately after she emerged victorious from the fight with Daly. Invicta initially wanted longer deal, but eventually agreed with Kankaanpää and closed a three-fight contract in early 2013.

She made her first fight for the organisation at Invicta FC 5: Penne vs. Waterson where she defeated Brazilian Juliana Carneiro Lima by unanimous decision. The first defeat of her career Kankaanpää suffered at Invicta FC 7 on December 7, 2013. In a close decision (29:28, 29:28, 29:28), she was defeated by Joanne Calderwood.

On September 6, 2014, Kankaanpää fought for the vacant strawweight title against Stephanie Eggink at Invicta FC 8. She defeated Eggink via submission in round 5 and became the second InvictaFC strawweight Champion. The bout was named "Fight of the Night". On January 17, 2015, Invicta FC announced the prolonging of the contract for 3 more fights.

Katja's first title defense took place at Invicta FC 12: Kankaanpää vs. Souza on April 24, 2015, in Kansas City, Missouri. After dominating the first three rounds, she got caught by Brazilian Lívia Renata Souza in the fourth in a Triangle choke and had to tap out.

Kankaanpää fought DeAnna Bennett in Kansas City on September 12 in the co-main event of Invicta FC 14. Kankaanpää lost the fight via controversial unanimous decision and subsequently announced her retirement from MMA the following day.

== Personal life ==
Katja is married; her maiden name was Katja Kalliokoski. She studied electronic business and is currently working as a media person in charge.

== Championships and accomplishments ==
=== Mixed martial arts ===
- Invicta Fighting Championships
  - Strawweight Champion (One time)
  - Fight of the Night (One time) vs. Stephanie Eggink
- Awards
  - Nordic Female Fighter of the Year 2014
  - Sportswoman of 2014 (MMA)

== Mixed martial arts record ==
Professional record breakdown
13 matches	10 wins	3 losses
By knockout	1	0
By submission	4	1
By decision	5	2

Res.	Record	Opponent	Method	Event	Date	Round	Time	Location	Notes
Loss	10–3–1	DeAnna Bennett	Decision (unanimous)	Invicta FC 14: Evinger vs. Kianzad	September 12, 2015	3	5:00	Kansas City, Missouri, United States	
Loss	10–2–1	Lívia Renata Souza	Submission (triangle choke)	Invicta FC 12: Kankaanpää vs. Souza	April 24, 2015	4	3:58	Kansas City, Missouri, United States	Lost the Invicta FC Strawweight Championship.
Win	10–1–1	Stephanie Eggink	Submission (D'Arce choke)	Invicta FC 8: Waterson vs. Tamada	September 6, 2014	5	2:03	Kansas City, Missouri, United States	Won the vacant Invicta FC Strawweight Championship. Fight of the Night.
Win	9–1–1	Alyona Rassohyna	Submission (armbar)	Lappeenranta Fight Night 10	May 17, 2014	2	0:49	Lappeenranta, Finland	
Loss	8–1–1	Joanne Calderwood	Decision (unanimous)	Invicta FC 7: Honchak vs. Smith	December 7, 2013	3	5:00	Kansas City, Missouri, United States	
Win	8–0–1	Juliana Carneiro Lima	Decision (unanimous)	Invicta FC 5: Penne vs. Waterson	April 5, 2013	3	5:00	Kansas City, Missouri, United States	Invicta FC Debut.
Win	7–0–1	Aisling Daly	Decision (unanimous)	Cage Warriors: 51	December 31, 2012	3	5:00	Dublin, Ireland	
Draw	6–0–1	Simona Soukupova	Draw (split)	BP 12 – Botnia Punishment 12	March 23, 2012	3	5:00	Seinäjoki, Finland	
Win	6–0	Mei Yamaguchi	Decision (unanimous)	BP 11 – Kankaanpää vs. Yamaguchi	March 23, 2012	3	5:00	Seinäjoki, Finland	
Win	5–0	Karla Benitez	Decision (unanimous)	Cage 16 – 1st Defense	October 8, 2011	2	5:00	Espoo, Uusimaa, Finland	
Win	4–0	Ekaterina Tarnavskaja	Submission (rear-naked choke)	Cage 15 – Powered by Reezig	April 29, 2011	1	2:12	Espoo, Uusimaa, Finland	
Win	3–0	Niina Aaltonen	Submission (D'Arce choke)	BP 9 – Animal Factory	October 9, 2010	2	2:12	Vaasa, Ostrobothnia, Finland	
Win	2–0	Dalia Grakulskyte	TKO (punches)	BP Fight Night 2 – Rumble in Amarillo	April 17, 2010	1	2:13	Vaasa, Ostrobothnia, Finland	
Win	1–0	Paulina Suska	Decision (unanimous)	OF – Oulu Fight 2	March 27, 2010	2	5:00	Oulu, Northern Ostrobothnia, Finland	Pro Debut

== See also ==
- List of female mixed martial artists

Awards and achievements
Preceded by Carla Esparza	2nd Invicta FC Strawweight Champion; September 6, 2014 – April 24, 2015	Succeeded by Lívia Renata Souza
