= LaRue Burley =

American mixed martial arts fighter

- Born: April 25, 1984 (age 42); Gilbert, Arizona, United States
- Other names: The Cannibal
- Height: 5 ft 10 in (1.78 m)
- Weight: 170 lb (77 kg; 12 st)
- Division: welterweight
- Reach: 70 in (180 cm)
- Stance: Orthodox
- Fighting out of: Phoenix, Arizona, United States
- Team: Power MMA
- Years active: 2012–present

Mixed martial arts record
- Total: 15
- Wins: 11
- By knockout: 4
- By submission: 3
- By decision: 4
- Losses: 4
- By knockout: 2
- By decision: 2

Other information
- Mixed martial arts record from Sherdog

LaRue Burley (born April 25, 1984) is an American mixed martial artist currently competing in the Welterweight division of the XFC. A professional competitor since 2012, he has also fought in WSOF, Bellator MMA, King of the Cage and the RFA.

== Mixed martial arts career ==
=== Amateur career ===
Burley began his amateur MMA career in 2012, compiling a record of 2-0.

=== Bellator MMA ===
After going 2–0 in smaller promotions, Burley made his Bellator debut against Bubba Jenkins on September 20, 2013, at Bellator 100. Despite being a heavy underdog, Burley won the fight via technical knockout in the third round.

In his next Bellator appearance, Burley faced Cliff Wright at Bellator 117 on April 18, 2014. He won the fight via unanimous decision.

Burley faced Raymond Pina at Bellator 126 on September 26, 2014. He won the fight via submission in the second round.

=== Resurrection Fighting Alliance ===
Burley signed with the Resurrection Fighting Alliance and made his promotional debut against T.J. Hepburn on April 10, 2015, at RFA 25: Lawrence vs. Toomer. He won the fight via guillotine choke submission in the first round.

=== World Series of Fighting ===
In June 2015, Burley signed an exclusive, multi-fight contract with the World Series of Fighting. In his debut, he faced Brian Foster at WSOF 23 on September 18, 2015. He lost the fight via knockout in the first round.

In his second fight for the promotion, Burley faced Ramil Mustapayev at WSOF 25 on November 20, 2015. He lost the fight via unanimous decision.

== Personal life ==
Burley has three sons and one daughter.

== Mixed martial arts record ==
Professional record breakdown
15 matches	11 wins	4 losses
By knockout	4	2
By submission	3	0
By decision	4	2
Draws	0	

Res.	Record	Opponent	Method	Event	Date	Round	Time	Location	Notes
Win	11–4	Bradley Desir	TKO (punches)	XFC 44	May 28, 2021	3	3:14	Des Moines, Iowa, United States	
Win	10–4	Alejandro Sanchez	Submission (guillotine choke)	XFC 43	November 11, 2020	3	4:21	Atlanta, Georgia, United States	
Win	9–4	Manny Villareal	Decision (unanimous)	LFA 53	November 9, 2018	3	5:00	Phoenix, Arizona, United States	Catchweight (165 lbs) bout.
Loss	8–4	Rafa García	KO (punches)	Combate 24: Alday vs. Lopez	September 14, 2018	1	2:26	Phoenix, Arizona, United States	
Win	8–3	Maycon Mendonça	Decision (unanimous)	LFA 24	October 13, 2017	3	5:00	Phoenix, Arizona, United States	
Loss	7–3	James Nakashima	Decision (unanimous)	LFA 11	May 5, 2017	3	5:00	Phoenix, Arizona, United States	Welterweight bout.
Win	7–2	Cedric Marks	TKO (punches)	Fists of Fury 11	September 10, 2016	3	1:00	Woodward, Oklahoma, United States	Welterweight bout.
Loss	6–2	Ramil Mustapayev	Decision (unanimous)	WSOF 25	November 20, 2015	3	5:00	Phoenix, Arizona, United States	WSOF Lightweight Tournament Reserve bout
Loss	6–1	Brian Foster	KO (punch)	WSOF 23	September 18, 2015	1	0:32	Phoenix, Arizona, United States	
Win	6–0	T.J. Hepburn	Submission (guillotine choke)	RFA 25: Lawrence vs. Toomer	April 10, 2015	1	3:49	Sioux Falls, South Dakota, United States	
Win	5–0	Raymond Pina	Submission (guillotine choke)	Bellator 126	September 26, 2014	2	0:22	Phoenix, Arizona, United States	Catchweight (160 lbs) bout.
Win	4–0	Cliff Wright	Decision (unanimous)	Bellator 117	April 18, 2014	3	5:00	Council Bluffs, Iowa, United States	
Win	3–0	Bubba Jenkins	TKO (punches)	Bellator 100	September 20, 2013	3	3:40	Phoenix, Arizona, United States	
Win	2–0	Gabe Rivas	TKO (punches)	KOTC: Regulators	January 19, 2013	1	1:06	Scottsdale, Arizona, United States	
Win	1–0	Kelley Oser	Decision (unanimous)	Coalition of Combat: Pound for Pound	September 15, 2012	3	5:00	Phoenix, Arizona, United States	
