= Heather Clark (fighter) =

American mixed martial arts fighter

- Born: September 19, 1980 (age 46); Los Angeles, California, U.S.
- Other names: Hurricane
- Height: 5 ft 6 in (1.68 m)
- Weight: 115 lb (52 kg; 8 st 3 lb)
- Division: Strawweight; Flyweight
- Reach: 66 in (170 cm)
- Style: Boxing, BJJ
- Fighting out of: Albuquerque, New Mexico, United States
- Team: Xtreme Couture, Syndicate MMA
- Rank: Brown belt in Brazilian Jiu-Jitsu under Diego Brandão
- Years active: 2010–2018

Professional boxing record
- Total: 2
- Wins: 1
- Draws: 1

Mixed martial arts record
- Total: 14
- Wins: 8
- By knockout: 2
- By submission: 3
- By decision: 3
- Losses: 6
- By knockout: 1
- By decision: 5

Other information
- Boxing record from BoxRec
- Mixed martial arts record from Sherdog

Heather Clark (born September 19, 1980) is an American former mixed martial artist who competed in the Strawweight division of the Ultimate Fighting Championship (UFC), and Invicta Fighting Championships (Invicta).

== Mixed martial arts career ==
=== Early career ===
Clark made her professional MMA debut in April 2010. During the first two and a half years of her career, she amassed a record of five wins and three losses.

=== Bellator MMA ===
Clark signed with Bellator MMA in 2013 and faced Felice Herrig at Bellator 94. She lost the back-and-forth fight via split decision. Clark and Herrig would later have a rematch on their season of The Ultimate Fighter.

=== The Ultimate Fighter ===
Heather was among the final eight contestants that tried out for the TUF house, to join the 11 Invicta FC strawweights that President Dana White had acquired.

Heather was Team Melendez' sixth pick and ranked 11. She was paired to take on long-time rival #6 ranked Felice Herrig for her first fight.

In episode 5 Clark and Herrig fought with Herrig walking away with the unanimous decision. After the fight, Clark said she did some "soul-searching" and apologized to Herrig, saying she wasn't going to judge her anymore, squashing their feud.

=== Ultimate Fighting Championship ===
Clark made her UFC debut at The Ultimate Fighter 20 Finale where she defeated teammate and rival Bec Rawlings by unanimous decision. Heather faced Karolina Kowalkiewicz on May 8, 2016 at UFC Fight Night 87 in Rotterdam, Netherlands. She lost the fight by unanimous decision.

Her next fight came on November 5, 2016 at The Ultimate Fighter Latin America 3 Finale: dos Anjos vs. Ferguson against Alexa Grasso She lost the fight by unanimous decision.

=== Invicta Fighting Championships ===
After almost two years hiatus, Clark joined Invicta Fighting Championships (Invicta) and made her promotional debut on July 21, 2018 at Invicta FC 30: Frey vs. Grusander against Kinbery Novaes. She won the fight via unanimous decision.

Clark was scheduled to face Mizuki Inoue on November 16, 2018 at Invicta FC 32: Spencer vs. Sorenson but pulled out before the event.

== Championships and achievements ==
=== Mixed martial arts ===
- Women's MMA Press Awards
  - 2011 KO of the year

== Mixed martial arts record ==
Professional record breakdown
14 matches	8 wins	6 losses
By knockout	2	1
By submission	3	0
By decision	3	5

Res.	Record	Opponent	Method	Event	Date	Round	Time	Location	Notes
Win	8–6	Kinberly Novaes	Decision (unanimous)	Invicta FC 30: Frey vs. Grusander	July 21, 2018	3	5:00	Kansas City, Missouri, United States	
Loss	7–6	Alexa Grasso	Decision (unanimous)	The Ultimate Fighter Latin America 3 Finale: dos Anjos vs. Ferguson	November 5, 2016	3	5:00	Mexico City, Mexico	
Loss	7–5	Karolina Kowalkiewicz	Decision (unanimous)	UFC Fight Night: Overeem vs. Arlovski	May 8, 2016	3	5:00	Rotterdam, Netherlands	
Win	7–4	Bec Rawlings	Decision (unanimous)	The Ultimate Fighter: A Champion Will Be Crowned Finale	December 12, 2014	3	5:00	Las Vegas, Nevada, United States	
Win	6–4	Hannah Cifers	Decision (unanimous)	XFC 26 - Night of Champions 3	October 13, 2013	3	5:00	Nashville, Tennessee, United States	
Loss	5–4	Felice Herrig	Decision (split)	Bellator 94	March 28, 2013	3	5:00	Tampa, Florida, United States	
Loss	5–3	Stephanie Eggink	Decision (unanimous)	XFC 21 - Night of Champions 2	December 7, 2012	3	5:00	Nashville, Tennessee, United States	
Win	5–2	Avery Vilche	Submission (rear-naked choke)	XFC 18 - Music City Mayhem	June 22, 2012	1	1:51	Nashville, Tennessee, United States	
Loss	4–2	Marianna Kheyfets	TKO (doctor stoppage)	XFC 16 - High Stakes	February 10, 2012	1	5:00	Knoxville, Tennessee, United States	
Win	4–1	Sarah Alpar	Submission (rear-naked choke)	FCF - Freestyle Cage Fighting 49	October 1, 2011	3	1:28	Shawnee, Oklahoma, United States	
Win	3–1	Jennifer Scott	TKO (elbows)	ECSC - Friday Night Fights 3	April 15, 2011	2	2:19	Clovis, New Mexico, United States	
Win	2–1	April Coutino	KO (punch)	ECSC - Friday Night Fights 1	January 7, 2011	1	0:10	Clovis, New Mexico, United States	
Win	1–1	Kyane Hampton	Submission (armbar)	ECSC - Evolution 1	October 30, 2010	1	1:54	Clovis, New Mexico, United States	
Loss	0–1	Karina Hallinan	Decision (unanimous)	VFC 31 - Victory Fighting Championship	April 23, 2010	3	5:00	Council Bluffs, Iowa, United States	

=== Mixed martial arts exhibition record ===
Exhibition record breakdown		
1 match	0 wins	1 loss
By decision	0	1

Res.	Record	Opponent	Method	Event	Date	Round	Time	Location	Notes
Loss	0–1	Felice Herrig	Decision (unanimous)	The Ultimate Fighter: A Champion Will Be Crowned	October 22, 2014 (airdate)	3	5:00	Las Vegas, Nevada, United States	TUF 20 Elimination round

== See also ==
- List of current UFC fighters
- List of female mixed martial artists
