= UFC 290 =

2023 mixed martial arts event

UFC 290: Volkanovski vs. Rodríguez
- The poster for UFC 290: Volkanovski vs. Rodríguez
- Promotion: Ultimate Fighting Championship
- Date: July 8, 2023
- Venue: T-Mobile Arena
- City: Paradise, Nevada, United States
- Attendance: 19,204
- Total gate: $9,750,000

Event chronology
UFC on ESPN: Strickland vs. Magomedov	UFC 290: Volkanovski vs. Rodríguez	UFC on ESPN: Holm vs. Bueno Silva

UFC 290: Volkanovski vs. Rodríguez was a mixed martial arts event produced by the Ultimate Fighting Championship that took place on July 8, 2023, at the T-Mobile Arena facility in Paradise, Nevada, part of the Las Vegas Metropolitan Area, United States.

== Background ==
A UFC Featherweight Championship unification bout between current champion Alexander Volkanovski and interim champion (also The Ultimate Fighter: Latin America featherweight winner) Yair Rodríguez headlined the event.

A UFC Flyweight Championship bout between current two-time champion Brandon Moreno and Alexandre Pantoja took place at the event. The pair first met in an exhibition bout on The Ultimate Fighter: Tournament of Champions in 2016 which Pantoja won by second round submission. They also met at UFC Fight Night: Maia vs. Usman in 2018 which Pantoja won by unanimous decision. Brandon Royval served as backup and potential replacement for this fight.

A UFC Middleweight title eliminator between former champion (also The Ultimate Fighter: The Smashes welterweight winner) Robert Whittaker and former KSW Welterweight Champion Dricus du Plessis took place at the event.

Former UFC Welterweight Champion Robbie Lawler took on Niko Price in a welterweight bout at the event in his retirement fight.

A lightweight bout between Kamuela Kirk and Esteban Ribovics took place at the event. They were scheduled to meet at UFC 285 in March 2023 Kirk withdrew from the event for undisclosed reasons.

A lightweight bout between Jalin Turner and Dan Hooker took place at the event. They were previously scheduled to meet at UFC 285 but Hooker withdrew due to injury. At the weigh-ins, Turner weighed in at 158 pounds, two pounds over the lightweight non-title fight limit. The bout proceeded at catchweight and he was fined 20% of his purse which went to Hooker.

A flyweight bout between former two-time flyweight champion Deiveson Figueiredo and former Rizin Bantamweight Champion Manel Kape was expected to take place at the event. However, Figueiredo withdrew in late April after he was not medically cleared to compete. The UFC officially cancelled the bout on May 13 after it was announced that Figueiredo would be moving to the bantamweight division. Kape is now expected to face former interim flyweight title challenger Kai Kara-France at UFC 293.

Christian Rodriguez and Cameron Saaiman were scheduled to meet in a bantamweight bout at the preliminary card. In turn, Rodriguez pulled out in late June and was replaced by promotional newcomer and former The Ultimate Fighter: Tournament of Champions cast member Terrence Mitchell.

A welterweight bout between Jack Della Maddalena and Sean Brady was expected to take place at the event. However, Brady withdrew a week before the event due to a Streptococcus pyogenes infection on his elbow. He was replaced by promotional newcomer Josiah Harrell. In turn the day before the event, Harrell was pulled from the fight due to being diagnosed with Moyamoya disease during his pre-fight medical screening.

A middleweight bout between Bo Nickal and Tresean Gore was expected to take place at the event. However, Gore withdrew just days before the event due to a torn ligament in his wrist. He was replaced by promotional newcomer Val Woodburn, who was scheduled to fight at Dana White's Contender Series on August 29.

== Results ==
Main card
Weight class				Method	Round	Time	Notes
Featherweight	Alexander Volkanovski (c)	def.	Yair Rodríguez (ic)	TKO (punches)	3	4:19	(Note: For the UFC Featherweight Championship.)
Flyweight	Alexandre Pantoja	def.	Brandon Moreno (c)	Decision (split) (46–49, 48–47, 48–47)	5	5:00	(Note: For the UFC Flyweight Championship.)
Middleweight	Dricus du Plessis	def.	Robert Whittaker	TKO (punches)	2	2:23	(Note: UFC Middleweight title eliminator.)
Catchweight (158 lb)	Dan Hooker	def.	Jalin Turner	Decision (split) (28–29, 29–28, 29–28)	3	5:00
Middleweight	Bo Nickal	def.	Val Woodburn	KO (punches)	1	0:38
Preliminary card (ABC / ESPN / ESPN+)
Welterweight	Robbie Lawler	def.	Niko Price	KO (punches)	1	0:38
Catchweight (130 lb)	Tatsuro Taira	def.	Édgar Cháirez	Decision (unanimous) (29–27, 29–27, 29–27)	3	5:00
Women's Strawweight	Denise Gomes	def.	Yazmin Jauregui	TKO (punches)	1	0:20
Light Heavyweight	Alonzo Menifield	def.	Jimmy Crute	Submission (guillotine choke)	2	1:55
Early preliminary card (ESPN+ / UFC Fight Pass)
Light Heavyweight	Vitor Petrino	def.	Marcin Prachnio	Submission (arm-triangle choke)	3	3:42
Bantamweight	Cameron Saaiman	def.	Terrence Mitchell	TKO (punches)	1	3:10
Flyweight	Jesús Santos Aguilar	def.	Shannon Ross	KO (punch)	1	0:17
Lightweight	Esteban Ribovics	def.	Kamuela Kirk	Decision (unanimous) (29–28, 29–28, 29–28)	3	5:00

== Bonus awards ==
The following fighters received $50,000 bonuses.

- Fight of the Night: Brandon Moreno vs. Alexandre Pantoja
- Performance of the Night: Dricus du Plessis and Denise Gomes

== See also ==
- List of UFC events
- List of current UFC fighters
- 2023 in UFC
