= Amanda Ribas =

Brazilian mixed martial artist (born 1993)

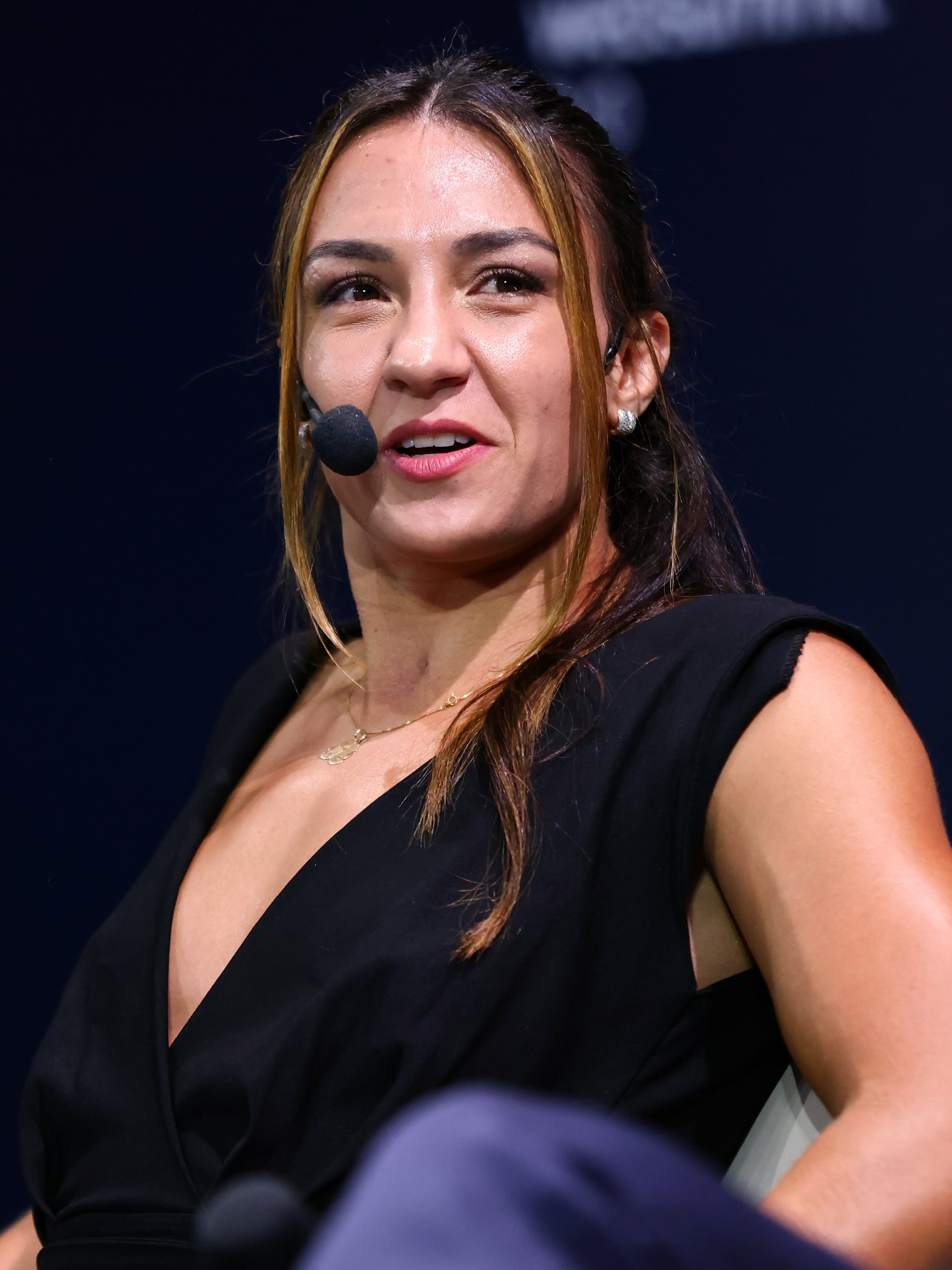
- Ribas in 2023
- Born: Amanda Limborco Alcântara Ribas; August 26, 1993 (age 33); Varginha, Minas Gerais, Brazil
- Height: 5 ft 4 in (1.63 m)
- Weight: 125 lb (57 kg; 8 st 13 lb)
- Division: Strawweight; Flyweight
- Reach: 66 in (168 cm)
- Fighting out of: Varginha, Minas Gerais, Brazil
- Team: Marcelo Ribas Team (formerly); American Top Team (2016–present)
- Rank: Black belt in Brazilian Jiu-Jitsu; Black belt in Judo
- Years active: 2014–present

Mixed martial arts record
- Total: 20
- Wins: 13
- By knockout: 4
- By submission: 4
- By decision: 5
- Losses: 7
- By knockout: 4
- By submission: 1
- By decision: 2

Other information
- Mixed martial arts record from Sherdog

Amanda Limborco Alcântara Ribas (born August 26, 1993) is a Brazilian professional mixed martial artist. She currently competes in the women's Strawweight and Flyweight divisions of the Ultimate Fighting Championship (UFC).

== Background ==
The Varginha native is the daughter of Marcelo Ribas, a judo and Jiu-jitsu coach who also teaches Muay Thai. She trained under her father until she was part of one of the national judo youth teams in Brazil. She stopped training and competing for some years after suffering knee injuries. She started to train and compete again after seeing some of her colleagues training for an MMA tournament.

I was born on the mat. It was for me. There was a time when I stopped grappling for dancing. My father wanted to die.

== Mixed martial arts career ==
=== Early career ===
After winning 2014 IMMAF World Championship in the Women's Flyweight division, Ribas started her professional MMA career in 2014 and fought primarily in Brazil. She amassed a record of 6–1 prior to being signed by UFC.

=== Ultimate Fighting Championship ===
Ribas was scheduled to face Juliana Lima at The Ultimate Fighter 25 Finale on July 7, 2017. However, Ribas was flagged by USADA for a potential anti-doping violation and removed from the bout. The possible violation stems from a sample collected June 7. She was replaced by Tecia Torres. She initially received a two-year sanction by USADA after testing positive for Ostarine, but the suspension was terminated on May 3, 2019 as USADA determined that the positive test was the result of an ostarine contaminated dietary supplement.

In her UFC debut, Ribas faced Emily Whitmire on June 29, 2019, at UFC on ESPN 3. She won the fight via a rear-naked choke submission in the second round.

On October 12, 2019, Ribas faced Mackenzie Dern at UFC Fight Night 161. She won the fight via unanimous decision.

Ribas was scheduled to face Paige VanZant on March 14, 2020 at UFC Fight Night 170. However, VanZant was forced to pull out of the fight due to fracturing her right arm, and she was replaced by Randa Markos. She won the fight via unanimous decision.

The bout with VanZant was rescheduled and eventually took place at UFC 251 on July 12, 2020. Ribas won the fight via a submission in round one.

Ribas was expected to face Carla Esparza on December 12, 2020 at UFC 256. However, on October 9, it was announced that Esparza was pulled due to undisclosed reasons. Instead, Ribas was scheduled to face Michelle Waterson on January 24, 2021 at UFC 257. However, it was reported on December 8, 2020 that Waterson was forced out of the event, and she was replaced by Marina Rodriguez. Ribas lost the fight via technical knockout in round two.

Ribas was scheduled to meet Angela Hill on May 8, 2021 at UFC on ESPN 24. However, the day of the event Ribas was removed from the bout due to COVID-19 protocols and the bout was cancelled. The bout was rescheduled for UFC Fight Night 189 on June 5, 2021. Two weeks later, the pairing was scrapped once again as Ribas was still suffering from lingering COVID-19 symptoms.

Ribas faced Virna Jandiroba on October 30, 2021 at UFC 267. She won the bout via unanimous decision.

Ribas was again scheduled to face Michelle Waterson on March 26, 2022 at UFC Fight Night 205. However, the bout was postponed to UFC 274 on May 7, 2022 due to Waterson sustaining an undisclosed injury before she ultimately was ruled out of the bout in mid-March.

Ribas faced Katlyn Chookagian on May 14, 2022 at UFC on ESPN 36. She lost the close bout via split decision. The bout earned Ribas her first Fight of the Night bonus award.

Ribas was scheduled to face Tracy Cortez on December 3, 2022 at UFC on ESPN 42. However, shortly after the official weigh-ins, the promotion announced Cortez was pulled from the bout due to an unspecified medical issue and the bout was cancelled.

Ribas faced Viviane Araújo on March 4, 2023, at UFC 285. She won the fight via unanimous decision.

Ribas faced Maycee Barber on June 24, 2023 at UFC on ABC 5. She lost the bout via technical knockout in the second round.

Ribas faced Luana Pinheiro in a strawweight bout on November 18, 2023, at UFC Fight Night 232. She won the fight via TKO in the third round. This fight earned her the Performance of the Night award.

Ribas faced former UFC Women's Strawweight champion Rose Namajunas on March 23, 2024 in the main event, at UFC on ESPN 53. She lost the bout by unanimous decision.

Ribas was scheduled to face Mackenzie Dern in a rematch on December 14, 2024 at UFC on ESPN 63. However, the bout was moved for unknown reasons to January 11, 2025 in order to serve as the main event at UFC Fight Night 249. Ribas lost the fight via an armbar submission at the end of the third round.

Ribas was scheduled to face Tabatha Ricci on July 19, 2025 at UFC 318. However, for unknown reasons, the bout was moved to UFC on ABC 9 which took place on July 26, 2025. Ribas lost the fight by technical knockout in the second round.

Ribas was scheduled to face Fatima Kline on July 18, 2026 at UFC Fight Night 281. However, Ribas withdrew due to dizziness and was replaced by Tabatha Ricci.

== Championships and awards ==
=== Mixed martial arts ===
- Ultimate Fighting Championship
  - Fight of the Night (One time) vs. Katlyn Chookagian
  - Performance of the Night (One time) vs. Luana Pinheiro
  - UFC.com Awards
    - 2019: Ranked #3 Newcomer of the Year
- Jungle Fight
  - Jungle Fight Strawweight Championship (One time)
- Max Fight
  - MF Strawweight Championship (One time)

== Mixed martial arts record ==
Professional record breakdown
20 matches	13 wins	7 losses
By knockout	4	4
By submission	4	1
By decision	5	2

Res.	Record	Opponent	Method	Event	Date	Round	Time	Location	Notes
Loss	13–7	Tabatha Ricci	TKO (elbow and punches)	UFC on ABC: Whittaker vs. de Ridder	July 26, 2025	2	2:59	Abu Dhabi, United Arab Emirates	
Loss	13–6	Mackenzie Dern	Submission (armbar)	UFC Fight Night: Dern vs. Ribas 2	January 11, 2025	3	4:56	Las Vegas, Nevada, United States	Return to Strawweight.
Loss	13–5	Rose Namajunas	Decision (unanimous)	UFC on ESPN: Ribas vs. Namajunas	March 23, 2024	5	5:00	Las Vegas, Nevada, United States	
Win	13–4	Luana Pinheiro	TKO (spinning wheel kick and punches)	UFC Fight Night: Allen vs. Craig	November 18, 2023	3	3:53	Las Vegas, Nevada, United States	Strawweight bout. Performance of the Night.
Loss	12–4	Maycee Barber	TKO (elbows and punches)	UFC on ABC: Emmett vs. Topuria	June 24, 2023	2	3:42	Jacksonville, Florida, United States	
Win	12–3	Viviane Araújo	Decision (unanimous)	UFC 285	March 4, 2023	3	5:00	Las Vegas, Nevada, United States	
Loss	11–3	Katlyn Chookagian	Decision (split)	UFC on ESPN: Błachowicz vs. Rakić	May 14, 2022	3	5:00	Las Vegas, Nevada, United States	Return to Flyweight. Fight of the Night.
Win	11–2	Virna Jandiroba	Decision (unanimous)	UFC 267	October 30, 2021	3	5:00	Abu Dhabi, United Arab Emirates	
Loss	10–2	Marina Rodriguez	TKO (elbow and punches)	UFC 257	January 24, 2021	2	0:54	Abu Dhabi, United Arab Emirates	Return to Strawweight.
Win	10–1	Paige VanZant	Submission (armbar)	UFC 251	July 12, 2020	1	2:21	Abu Dhabi, United Arab Emirates	Flyweight debut.
Win	9–1	Randa Markos	Decision (unanimous)	UFC Fight Night: Lee vs. Oliveira	March 14, 2020	3	5:00	Brasília, Brazil	
Win	8–1	Mackenzie Dern	Decision (unanimous)	UFC Fight Night: Joanna vs. Waterson	October 12, 2019	3	5:00	Tampa, Florida, United States	
Win	7–1	Emily Whitmire	Submission (rear-naked choke)	UFC on ESPN: Ngannou vs. dos Santos	June 29, 2019	2	2:10	Minneapolis, Minnesota, United States	
Win	6–1	Jennifer Gonzalez Araneda	TKO (punches)	Max Fight 18	May 21, 2016	2	0:42	Varginha, Brazil	Won the vacant MF Strawweight Championship.
Loss	5–1	Polyana Viana	KO (punches)	Jungle Fight 83	November 28, 2015	1	2:54	Rio de Janeiro, Brazil	Lost the Jungle Fight Strawweight Championship.
Win	5–0	Tania Pereda	Submission (rear-naked choke)	Jungle Fight 79	July 4, 2015	1	1:16	Rio de Janeiro, Brazil	Won the vacant Jungle Fight Strawweight Championship.
Win	4–0	Aline Sattelmayer	Decision (unanimous)	Jungle Fight 76	April 11, 2015	3	5:00	São Paulo, Brazil	
Win	3–0	Iara Sales	TKO (punches)	Pentagon Combat 20	September 27, 2014	1	0:36	Varginha, Brazil	
Win	2–0	Ariane Carnelossi	Submission (kneebar)	Pentagon Combat 20	September 27, 2014	1	4:14	Varginha, Brazil	
Win	1–0	Jéssica Almeida	TKO (punches)	Pentagon Combat 19	March 15, 2014	1	0:42	Boa Esperança, Brazil	Strawweight debut.

== See also ==
- List of current UFC fighters
- List of female mixed martial artists
