= Tabatha Ricci =

Brazilian mixed martial artist (born 1995)

- Born: Tabatha Ricci Fabri Salto; February 21, 1995 (age 31); Birigui, São Paulo, Brazil
- Other names: Baby Shark
- Height: 5 ft 2 in (157 cm)
- Weight: 115 lb (52 kg; 8 st 3 lb)
- Division: Strawweight
- Reach: 61 in (155 cm)
- Fighting out of: Ventura, California, U.S.
- Team: Paragon BJJ (2017–present); Knuckleheadz Boxing; Kings MMA (formerly); Black House
- Rank: Black belt in Brazilian Jiu-Jitsu under Ricardo Miller; Black belt in Judo under Michihiro Omigawa
- Years active: 2013–present

Mixed martial arts record
- Total: 17
- Wins: 12
- By knockout: 2
- By submission: 3
- By decision: 7
- Losses: 5
- By knockout: 1
- By decision: 4

Other information
- Mixed martial arts record from Sherdog

Tabatha Ricci Fabri Salto (born February 21, 1995) is a Brazilian mixed martial artist, currently competing in the women's Strawweight division in the Ultimate Fighting Championship. As of October 24, 2026, she is #13 in the Meta UFC women's strawweight rankings.

== Background ==
Ricci was born and raised in Birigui, Brazil. She has an older sister. Following her father's footsteps, Ricci started training judo at the age of six and took up Muay Thai at the age of 15. She started training Brazilian jiu-jitsu at the age of 17, and at 18 she began training in boxing and had her first professional bout.

She moved to Japan in 2017 for a year to compete in SEIZA competitions, before moving to the US to focus on mixed martial arts.

== Mixed martial arts career ==
=== Early career ===
Right after turning eighteen, Ricci made her professional mixed martial arts debut. Having difficulties in finding bouts after winning her first two bouts, Ricci eventually moved to Japan in 2017 to train various disciplines and compete in custom rules bouts. In late 2017 she moved to California in order to focus on her Brazilian jiu-jitsu. In 2020 she signed a three-fight contract with Legacy Fighting Alliance where she ultimately won all of her bouts, defeating Kelsey Arnesen at LFA 90 by way of unanimous decision, Vanessa Marie Grimes via first round armbar at LFA 98 and finally Shawna Ormsby at LFA 105 via TKO stoppage in the second round.

=== Ultimate Fighting Championship ===
Replacing withdrawn Maryna Moroz, Ricci made her promotional debut on 4 days notice against Manon Fiorot on June 5, 2021 at UFC Fight Night 189. Ricci lost the bout via standing TKO in the second round.

Following her debut returned back to strawweight division and made her sophomore appearance in the organization against Maria Oliveira at UFC Fight Night 196 on October 23, 2021. She won the fight via unanimous decision.

Ricci faced Polyana Viana on May 21, 2022 at UFC Fight Night 206. She won the fight via unanimous decision.

Ricci was scheduled to face Cheyanne Vlismas on October 1, 2022 at UFC Fight Night 211. Vlismas pulled out in late August for personal reasons and was replaced by former UFC Women's Strawweight Championship challenger and inaugural Invicta FC Atomweight Champion Jessica Penne, however the fight was cancelled due to an illness with Penne on the day of the weigh-ins.

Ricci faced Jessica Penne on March 4, 2023, at UFC 285. She won the fight via an armbar in the second round.

Ricci faced Gillian Robertson on June 24, 2023 at UFC on ABC 5. She won the bout via unanimous decision.

Ricci faced Loopy Godínez on November 11, 2023, at UFC 295. She lost the close bout via split decision.

Ricci faced Tecia Pennington on May 11, 2024, at UFC on ESPN 56. She won the fight by split decision.

Ricci faced former Invicta Fighting Strawweight Champion Angela Hill on August 24, 2024 at UFC on ESPN 62. She won the fight by unanimous decision.

Ricci faced Yan Xiaonan on November 23, 2024, at UFC Fight Night 248. She lost the fight by unanimous decision.

Ricci was scheduled to face Amanda Ribas on July 19, 2025 at UFC 318. However, for unknown reasons, the bout was moved to UFC on ABC 9 which took place on July 26, 2025. Ricci won the fight by technical knockout in the second round.

Ricci faced Virna Jandiroba on April 4, 2026 at UFC Fight Night 272. She lost the fight by unanimous decision.

Replacing Amanda Ribas who withdrew due to dizziness, Ricci faced Fatima Kline on July 18, 2026 at UFC Fight Night 281. Ricci lost the fight by unanimous decision.

== Mixed martial arts record ==
Professional record breakdown
17 matches	12 wins	5 losses
By knockout	2	1
By submission	3	0
By decision	7	4

Res.	Record	Opponent	Method	Event	Date	Round	Time	Location	Notes
Loss	12–5	Fatima Kline	Decision (unanimous)	UFC Fight Night: du Plessis vs. Usman	July 18, 2026	3	5:00	Oklahoma City, Oklahoma, United States	
Loss	12–4	Virna Jandiroba	Decision (unanimous)	UFC Fight Night: Moicano vs. Duncan	April 4, 2026	3	5:00	Las Vegas, Nevada, United States	
Win	12–3	Amanda Ribas	TKO (elbow and punches)	UFC on ABC: Whittaker vs. de Ridder	July 26, 2025	2	2:59	Abu Dhabi, United Arab Emirates	
Loss	11–3	Yan Xiaonan	Decision (unanimous)	UFC Fight Night: Yan vs. Figueiredo	November 23, 2024	3	5:00	Macau SAR, China	
Win	11–2	Angela Hill	Decision (unanimous)	UFC on ESPN: Cannonier vs. Borralho	August 24, 2024	3	5:00	Las Vegas, Nevada, United States	
Win	10–2	Tecia Pennington	Decision (split)	UFC on ESPN: Lewis vs. Nascimento	May 11, 2024	3	5:00	St. Louis, Missouri, United States	
Loss	9–2	Loopy Godínez	Decision (split)	UFC 295	November 11, 2023	3	5:00	New York City, New York, United States	
Win	9–1	Gillian Robertson	Decision (unanimous)	UFC on ABC: Emmett vs. Topuria	June 24, 2023	3	5:00	Jacksonville, Florida, United States	
Win	8–1	Jessica Penne	Submission (armbar)	UFC 285	March 4, 2023	2	2:14	Las Vegas, Nevada, United States	
Win	7–1	Polyana Viana	Decision (unanimous)	UFC Fight Night: Holm vs. Vieira	May 21, 2022	3	5:00	Las Vegas, Nevada, United States	
Win	6–1	Maria Oliveira	Decision (unanimous)	UFC Fight Night: Costa vs. Vettori	October 23, 2021	3	5:00	Las Vegas, Nevada, United States	Return to Strawweight.
Loss	5–1	Manon Fiorot	TKO (punches)	UFC Fight Night: Rozenstruik vs. Sakai	June 5, 2021	2	3:00	Las Vegas, Nevada, United States	Flyweight debut.
Win	5–0	Shawna Ormsby	TKO (punches)	LFA 105	April 23, 2021	2	4:50	Shawnee, Oklahoma, United States	
Win	4–0	Vanessa Marie Grimes	Submission (armbar)	LFA 98	January 29, 2021	1	1:07	Park City, Kansas, United States	
Win	3–0	Kelsey Arnesen	Decision (unanimous)	LFA 90	September 4, 2020	3	5:00	Sioux Falls, South Dakota, United States	
Win	2–0	Graziele Ricotta	Decision (unanimous)	Brazilian FC 4	October 4, 2014	3	5:00	Ribeirão Preto, Brazil	
Win	1–0	Danielle Cunha	Submission (armbar)	Fight Masters Combat 1	December 7, 2013	1	2:30	São Paulo, Brazil	Strawweight debut.

== See also ==
- List of current UFC fighters
- List of female mixed martial artists
