= Luana Pinheiro =

Brazilian mixed martial artist

- Born: Luana Munize Barbosa Pinheiro; November 18, 1993 (age 32); João Pessoa, Paraíba, Brazil
- Height: 5 ft 4 in (1.63 m)
- Weight: 115 lb (52 kg; 8 st 3 lb)
- Division: Strawweight
- Reach: 62 in (157 cm)
- Fighting out of: Rio de Janeiro, Brazil
- Team: BH Rhinos; Nova União
- Rank: Black belt in Judo; Purple belt in Brazilian Jiu-Jitsu
- Years active: 2016–present

Mixed martial arts record
- Total: 16
- Wins: 11
- By knockout: 2
- By submission: 5
- By decision: 3
- By disqualification: 1
- Losses: 5
- By knockout: 1
- By submission: 1
- By decision: 3

Other information
- Mixed martial arts record from Sherdog

Luana Munize Barbosa Pinheiro (born November 18, 1993) is a Brazilian professional mixed martial artist who competes in the women's Strawweight division of the Ultimate Fighting Championship (UFC).

== Background ==
Pinheiro was born into a family of judokas and started the sport at the age of two in her hometown of João Pessoa. After an accomplished junior career in judo she moved to Belo Horizonte in 2011 in pursuit of a spot in the Brazilian Olympic judo team. However, her Olympic dreams didn't materialize and she opted to start training mixed martial arts in late 2015.

== Mixed martial arts career ==
=== Early career ===
Pinheiro racked a 7–1 record, competing in Brazilian regional circuit and Brave Combat Federation before being invited to Dana White's Contender Series.

=== Dana White's Contender Series ===
Pinheiro faced Stephanie Frausto at Dana White's Contender Series 35 on November 10, 2020. She won the fight via first-round technical knockout and was awarded a UFC contract.

=== Ultimate Fighting Championship ===
Pinheiro was scheduled to make her promotional debut against Randa Markos on March 27, 2021, at UFC 260. However, Markos was removed from the card on March 18 after testing positive for COVID-19. The bout was rescheduled for May 1, 2021, at UFC on ESPN: Reyes vs. Procházka. Pinheiro won the bout via disqualification in the first round after Markos accidentally upkicked her in the head, rendering her unable to continue.

Pinheiro was scheduled to make her sophomore appearance in the organization against Jessica Penne at UFC Fight Night 198 on November 20, 2021. However Penne withdrew from the bout for undisclosed reason and she was replaced by Sam Hughes. She won the bout via unanimous decision.

Pinheiro was again scheduled to face Jessica Penne on April 30, 2022, at UFC Fight Night 208. Their bout is once again cancelled due to Pinheiro pulling out due to an undisclosed injury.

Pinhero faced Michelle Waterson on April 8, 2023, at UFC 287. She won the close bout via split decision.

Pinhero faced Amanda Ribas on November 18, 2023, at UFC Fight Night 232. She lost the fight by TKO in the third round.

Pinhero faced Angela Hill on May 18, 2024, at UFC Fight Night 241. She lost the bout by a guillotine choke submission in the second round.

Pinhero faced Gillian Robertson on November 9, 2024 at UFC Fight Night 247. She lost the fight by unanimous decision.

Pinhero faced Tecia Pennington on May 17, 2025 at UFC Fight Night 256. She lost the fight by unanimous decision.

== Professional grappling career ==
Pinheiro competed against Ffion Davies in the co-main event of ADXC 2 on January 19, 2024. She lost the match by submission in the first round.

== Mixed martial arts record ==
Professional record breakdown
16 matches	11 wins	5 losses
By knockout	2	1
By submission	5	1
By decision	3	3
By disqualification	1	0

Res.	Record	Opponent	Method	Event	Date	Round	Time	Location	Notes
Loss	11–5	Tecia Pennington	Decision (unanimous)	UFC Fight Night: Burns vs. Morales	May 17, 2025	3	5:00	Las Vegas, Nevada, United States	
Loss	11–4	Gillian Robertson	Decision (unanimous)	UFC Fight Night: Magny vs. Prates	November 9, 2024	3	5:00	Las Vegas, Nevada, United States	
Loss	11–3	Angela Hill	Submission (guillotine choke)	UFC Fight Night: Barboza vs. Murphy	May 18, 2024	2	4:12	Las Vegas, Nevada, United States	
Loss	11–2	Amanda Ribas	TKO (spinning wheel kick and punches)	UFC Fight Night: Allen vs. Craig	November 18, 2023	3	3:53	Las Vegas, Nevada, United States	
Win	11–1	Michelle Waterson-Gomez	Decision (split)	UFC 287	April 8, 2023	3	5:00	Miami, Florida, United States	
Win	10–1	Sam Hughes	Decision (unanimous)	UFC Fight Night: Vieira vs. Tate	November 20, 2021	3	5:00	Las Vegas, Nevada, United States	
Win	9–1	Randa Markos	DQ (illegal upkick)	UFC on ESPN: Reyes vs. Procházka	May 1, 2021	1	4:16	Las Vegas, Nevada, United States	
Win	8–1	Stephanie Frausto	KO (punches)	Dana White's Contender Series 35	November 10, 2020	1	2:48	Las Vegas, Nevada, United States	
Win	7–1	Helen Harper	KO (punches)	Brave CF 29	November 15, 2019	1	3:00	Isa Town, Bahrain	
Win	6–1	Yasmeli Araque	Submission (rear-naked choke)	Brave CF 26	September 7, 2019	1	2:34	Bogotá, Colombia	
Win	5–1	Elaine Leal	Submission (guillotine choke)	Brave CF 11	April 13, 2019	1	4:46	Belo Horizonte, Brazil	
Win	4–1	Jessica Kelly Soares Rodrigues	Submission (rear-naked choke)	Federação Fight 7	March 10, 2018	1	2:37	Belo Horizonte, Brazil	
Win	3–1	Charlene Batista de Souza	Submission (armbar)	Federação Fight 4	July 1, 2017	1	1:40	Belo Horizonte, Brazil	
Loss	2–1	Cris Macfer Ferreira Macedo	Decision (split)	All Fights 1	March 19, 2017	3	5:00	Belo Horizonte, Brazil	
Win	2–0	Jessica Kelly Soares Rodrigues	Submission (armbar)	BH Sparta 10	November 19, 2016	1	2:00	Belo Horizonte, Brazil	
Win	1–0	Thatiane Araújo	Decision (unanimous)	BH Sparta 9	October 9, 2016	3	5:00	Belo Horizonte, Brazil	

== See also ==
- List of current UFC fighters
- List of female mixed martial artists
