= Alida Gray =

American martial artist

- Born: Alida Yvette Gray; April 12, 1977 (age 49); North Hollywood, California, U.S.
- Height: 5 ft 4 in (1.63 m)
- Weight: 115 lb (52 kg; 8 st 3 lb)
- Division: Strawweight
- Style: Judo

Mixed martial arts record
- Total: 7
- Wins: 4
- By knockout: 3
- By submission: 1
- Losses: 3
- By knockout: 2
- By submission: 1

Other information
- University: California State University, San Bernardino
- Mixed martial arts record from Sherdog

Alida Yvette Gray (born April 12, 1977) is an American judoka and mixed martial artist. She was born in North Hollywood, California and is of Russian-Jewish and Mexican descent. She graduated from Cal. State University of San Bernardino.

== Judo ==
Gray achieved notability for her success in judo, where she competed in the under 52 kg division. She was second at the U.S. Judo Championships in 1994 and 1995, while finishing third in both 1996 and 1997. She was also the second alternate for the 1996 Atlanta Olympics after finishing third behind Marisa Pedulla and JoAnne Quiring.

== MMA ==
Gray is currently 4-3 in professional MMA fighting, having previously fought against Jessica Aguilar for the inaugural World Series of Fighting women’s strawweight championship.

== Mixed martial arts record ==
Professional record breakdown
7 matches	4 wins	3 losses
By knockout	3	2
By submission	1	1

Res.	Record	Opponent	Method	Event	Date	Round	Time	Location	Notes
Loss	4–3	Angela Hill	KO (knee to the body)	Invicta FC 15: Cyborg vs. Ibragimova	January 16, 2016	1	1:39	Costa Mesa, California, United States	
Loss	4–2	Alexa Grasso	TKO (punches)	Invicta FC 10: Waterson vs. Tiburcio	December 5, 2014	1	1:47	Houston, Texas, United States	
Loss	4–1	Jessica Aguilar	Submission (arm-triangle choke)	WSOF 8	January 18, 2014	1	2:45	Hollywood, Florida, United States	For the inaugural WSOF Women's Strawweight Championship.
Win	4–0	Katie Klimansky-Casimir	TKO (punches)	SCS 20 - Vinte	November 23, 2013	1	2:45	Oklahoma, United States	
Win	3–0	Soannia Tiem	KO (punch)	4/7 Entertainment 12 - State of Emergency	October 26, 2013	3	0:05	Texas, United States	
Win	2–0	Jessica Armstrong-Kennett	TKO (punches and elbows)	Rocktagon MMA 28 - Journey of Champions 1	July 26, 2013	2	2:40	Texas, United States	
Win	1–0	Patricia Vidonic	Submission (armbar)	SCS 17 - Mayhem	June 3, 2013	2	2:19	Oklahoma, United States	

== See also ==
- List of Jews in sports § Judo
