= UFC Fight Night: du Plessis vs. Usman =

Mixed martial arts event in 2026

- The poster for UFC Fight Night: du Plessis vs. Usman
- Promotion: Ultimate Fighting Championship
- Date: July 18, 2026
- Venue: Paycom Center
- City: Oklahoma City, Oklahoma, United States
- Attendance: 17,173
- Total gate: $3,187,383

Event chronology
UFC 329: McGregor vs. Holloway 2	UFC Fight Night: du Plessis vs. Usman	UFC Fight Night: Ankalaev vs. Guskov

UFC Fight Night: du Plessis vs. Usman (also known as UFC Fight Night 281) was a mixed martial arts event produced by the Ultimate Fighting Championship that took place on July 18, 2026, at the Paycom Center in Oklahoma City, Oklahoma, United States.

== Background ==
This event marked the promotion's third visit to Oklahoma City and first since UFC Fight Night: Chiesa vs. Lee in June 2017.

A middleweight bout between former UFC Middleweight Champion (also former KSW Welterweight Champion) Dricus du Plessis and former UFC Welterweight Champion (also The Ultimate Fighter: American Top Team vs. Blackzilians welterweight winner) Kamaru Usman headlined the event.

A women's strawweight bout between Amanda Ribas and Fatima Kline was scheduled for the event. However, Ribas withdrew due to dizziness and was replaced by Tabatha Ricci.

Brad Tavares was expected to face Marc-André Barriault in a middleweight bout. However, Tavares pulled out due to undisclosed reasons, so the bout was cancelled.

Veronica Hardy and Dione Barbosa were expected to meet in a women's flyweight bout at the preliminary card. However, Hardy pulled out in early July after suffering a cut during training and was replaced by promotional newcomer Anna Melisano.

A bantamweight bout between former UFC Bantamweight Championship challenger Marlon Vera and Charles Jourdain was reportedly scheduled to take place as the co-main event. However, the bout was moved to UFC 331 for unknown reasons.

A heavyweight bout between Alvin Hines and Allen Frye Jr. was originally booked for the event. However, Frye Jr. pulled out due to undisclosed reasons and was replaced by promotional newcomer RJ Harris.

In addition, a welterweight bout between Kevin Holland and undefeated prospect Jacobe Smith was scheduled for the event. However, Holland had to withdraw due to an undisclosed injury and the pairing was cancelled.

At the weigh-ins, two fighters missed weight:

- Chase Hooper weighed in at 157.5 pounds, one and a half pounds over the lightweight non-title fight limit.
- Promotional newcomer Ezra Elliott weighed in at 147.5 pounds, one and a half pounds over the featherweight non-title fight limit.

Hooper and Elliott's bouts proceeded at catchweight. Both fighters were fined a percentage of their individual purses which went to their opponents Mitch Ramirez (20 percent) and fellow promotional newcomer Damien Anderson (undisclosed), respectively.

== Results ==
Main card (Paramount+)
Weight class				Method	Round	Time	Notes
Middleweight	Dricus du Plessis	def.	Kamaru Usman	Decision (unanimous) (50–45, 49–46, 49–46)	5	5:00
Middleweight	Christian Leroy Duncan	def.	Jared Cannonier	Decision (unanimous) (30–27, 30–27, 29–28)	3	5:00
Catchweight (157.5 lb)	Chase Hooper	def.	Mitch Ramirez	Submission (rear-naked choke)	1	2:15
Women's Strawweight	Fatima Kline	def.	Tabatha Ricci	Decision (unanimous) (30–27, 30–27, 30–27)	3	5:00
Featherweight	Tommy McMillen	def.	Alberto Montes	TKO (punches)	3	3:29
Preliminary card (Paramount+)
Featherweight	José Miguel Delgado	def.	Austin Bashi	Decision (unanimous) (30–27, 29–28, 29–28)	3	5:00
Welterweight	Jean-Paul Lebosnoyani	def.	Ko Seok-hyeon	Decision (unanimous) (29–28, 29–28, 29–28)	3	5:00
Light Heavyweight	Felipe Franco	def.	Levi Rodrigues Jr.	TKO (punches)	2	1:40
Catchweight (147.5 lb)	Ezra Elliott	def.	Damien Anderson	Decision (unanimous) (30–27, 29–28, 29–28)	3	5:00
Flyweight	Alden Coria	def.	Stewart Nicoll	Decision (unanimous) (30–27, 30–27, 29–28)	3	5:00
Heavyweight	RJ Harris	def.	Alvin Hines	TKO (punches)	1	1:40
Women's Flyweight	Dione Barbosa	def.	Anna Melisano	Submission (rear-naked choke)	1	4:04

== Bonus awards ==
The following fighters received $100,000 bonuses. The other finishes received $25,000 additional bonuses, with the exception of Chase Hooper, as he missed weight for his bout.

- Fight of the Night: Dricus du Plessis vs. Kamaru Usman
- Performance of the Night: Tommy McMillen and Felipe Franco

== See also ==
- 2026 in UFC
- List of current UFC fighters
- List of UFC events
