= Dricus du Plessis =

South African mixed martial artist (born 1994)

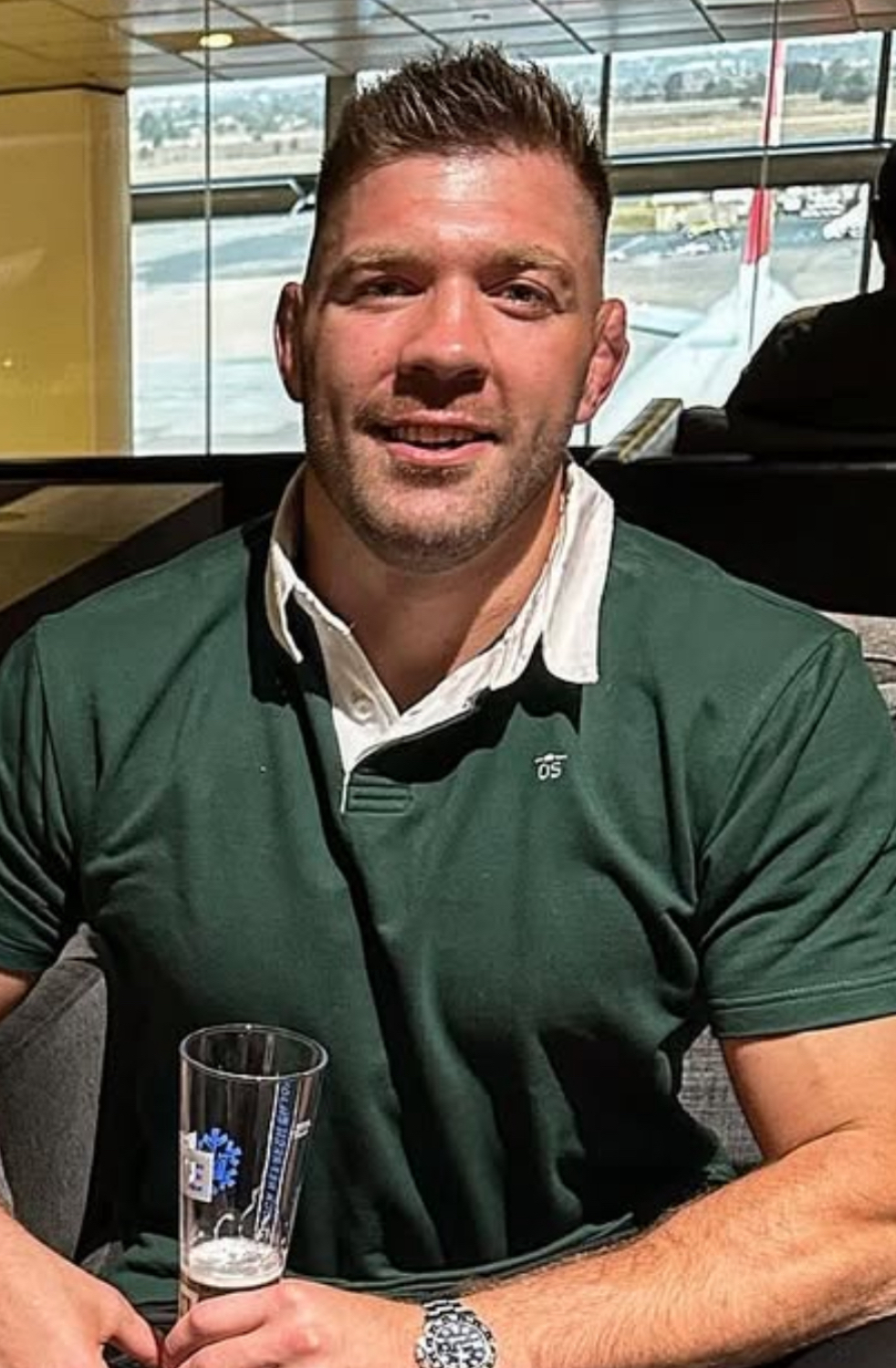
- Du Plessis in 2023
- Born: 14 January 1994 (age 32); Welkom, Orange Free State, South Africa
- Other names: Stillknocks
- Height: 6 ft 0 in (183 cm)
- Weight: 185 lb (84 kg; 13 st 3 lb)
- Division: Middleweight (2013–2017; 2019–present); Welterweight (2015–2018)
- Reach: 76 in (193 cm)
- Stance: Orthodox
- Fighting out of: Hatfield, Pretoria, Gauteng, South Africa
- Team: Team CIT MMA
- Trainer: Morne Visser
- Rank: 2nd degree black belt in kickboxing
- Years active: 2013–present

Mixed martial arts record
- Total: 27
- Wins: 24
- By knockout: 9
- By submission: 11
- By decision: 4
- Losses: 3
- By knockout: 1
- By submission: 1
- By decision: 1

Amateur kickboxing record
- Total: 33
- Wins: 33
- By knockout: 30
- Losses: 0

Other information
- Mixed martial arts record from Sherdog

Dricus du Plessis (born 14 January 1994), also known by his initials DDP, is a South African professional mixed martial artist. He currently competes in the Middleweight division of the Ultimate Fighting Championship (UFC), where he is a former UFC Middleweight Champion. He is the first South African to win a UFC championship. As of 19 August 2025, he is #2 in the Meta UFC middleweight rankings. Outside of the UFC, du Plessis is also the former Welterweight and Middleweight Extreme Fighting Championship (EFC) Champion, and the former Konfrontacja Sztuk Walki (KSW) Welterweight Champion.

== Background ==
Dricus du Plessis was born on 14 January 1994 in Welkom, South Africa. He is an Afrikaner. Du Plessis began training in judo at the age of five, followed by wrestling at twelve, then kickboxing at fourteen. In 2012, at 17 years old, du Plessis became South Africa's first ever medalist at the WAKO World Championships by winning gold in K-1 style kickboxing, but decided to transition to mixed martial arts after realising there was not as much money in kickboxing. Along with martial arts, du Plessis also played rugby throughout his schooling years, and has since been a vocal supporter of the Springboks, South Africa's national rugby team. He attended the University of Pretoria, where he studied agricultural economics but dropped out during the final year in order to pursue a career in mixed martial arts.

== Mixed martial arts career ==
=== Extreme Fighting Championship ===
Du Plessis had three amateur bouts before he made his professional debut in 2013, compiling a 4–0 record before facing future UFC fighter and then-EFC Middleweight Champion Garreth McLellan at EFC Africa 33, losing via guillotine choke submission in the third round.

In June 2015, du Plessis made his welterweight debut at EFC Africa 40 against Dino Bagattin, winning via a second-round rear-naked choke submission. After going 3–0 in 2015, du Plessis faced veteran striker Martin van Staden at EFC 50 for the vacant EFC Welterweight Championship. Du Plessis won via guillotine choke submission in the third round. Du Plessis was later set to defend his title against one of its former holders, Henry Fadipe. However, the bout was cancelled when Fadipe encountered issues with his visa.

Du Plessis returned to EFC in 2017, defeating Brazilian Mauricio Da Rocha Jr. in a welterweight contest before facing Yannick Bahati at EFC Africa 62 for the Middleweight Championship. Du Plessis won by guillotine choke at 1:30 of the first round, becoming a two-division champion within the promotion.

=== Konfrontacja Sztuk Walki ===
In 2018, du Plessis was slated to challenge Roberto Soldić for the KSW Welterweight Championship at KSW 43: Soldić vs. Du Plessis on 14 April. In an upset, du Plessis dethroned Soldic via TKO, after dropping him with a left hook. The two would later rematch at KSW 45: De Fries vs. Bedorf in October of that year, with du Plessis losing via third-round knockout.

Du Plessis fought again for KSW at KSW 50 against Joilton Santos, winning via TKO.

=== Return to EFC ===
After Brendan Lesar upset veteran Garreth McLellan for the EFC Interim Middleweight Championship at EFC Africa 80, du Plessis was next set to face Lesar for the title at EFC Africa 83. Du Plessis won via first-round guillotine choke submission.

=== Ultimate Fighting Championship ===
Du Plessis made his promotional debut against Markus Perez on 11 October 2020 at UFC Fight Night 179. He won the fight via knockout in round one.

Du Plessis was scheduled to face Trevin Giles on 20 March 2021 at UFC on ESPN 21. However, du Plessis pulled out due to visa issues which restricted his travel and was replaced by Roman Dolidze. The bout with Giles was rescheduled for 10 July 2021 on UFC 264. Du Plessis won the fight via knockout in round two. This win earned him the Performance of the Night award.

Du Plessis was scheduled to face Chris Curtis on 9 April 2022 at UFC 273. However, Curtis withdrew due to a wrist injury and was replaced by Anthony Hernandez. The bouts were yet again shuffled after Nassourdine Imavov withdrew due to visa issues, with du Plessis now facing Kelvin Gastelum. However, Gastelum withdrew a week before the event due to an undisclosed injury and his bout with du Plessis was cancelled.

Du Plessis then faced Brad Tavares at UFC 276 on 2 July 2022. He won the fight via unanimous decision.

Du Plessis faced Darren Till at UFC 282 on 10 December 2022. He won the fight via submission in round three. This fight earned him his first Fight of the Night award.

Du Plessis faced Derek Brunson on 4 March 2023, at UFC 285. He won the fight via technical knockout due to a corner stoppage at 4:59 of the second round.

Du Plessis faced former UFC Middleweight champion Robert Whittaker in a title eliminator fight on 8 July 2023, at UFC 290. He won the fight via technical knockout in the second round. This win earned him the Performance of the Night award and the number one contender spot in the middleweight division.

Following his defeat of Whittaker, it was expected that du Plessis would face Israel Adesanya for the UFC Middleweight Championship at UFC 293. However, du Plessis decided not to fight due to a leg injury, and was replaced by Sean Strickland.

==== UFC Middleweight Champion ====
Du Plessis faced Sean Strickland for the UFC Middleweight Championship on 20 January 2024, at UFC 297. The pair were in attendance at UFC 296 on 16 December 2023, seated within two rows of each-other by Dana White's arrangement. While exchanging words, Strickland gestured for audience members to move and attacked du Plessis. The brawl was quickly broken up and Strickland was escorted out of the event. At UFC 297, du Plessis won the bout by split decision, becoming the first UFC champion from South Africa. 13 out of 24 media outlets scored the bout for du Plessis. This fight earned him the Fight of the Night bonus.

Du Plessis made his first title defence against former two-time UFC Middleweight Champion Israel Adesanya on 18 August 2024 at UFC 305. He won the fight via a face crank submission in the fourth round, Adesanya's first career submission loss.

Du Plessis made his second title defence in a rematch against former champion Sean Strickland on 9 February 2025 at UFC 312. He won the fight by unanimous decision.

Du Plessis made his third title defence against undefeated contender Khamzat Chimaev on 16 August 2025 at UFC 319. He lost the title via unanimous decision.

==== Post championship ====
Du Plessis faced former UFC Welterweight Champion Kamaru Usman on 18 July 2026 in the main event at UFC Fight Night 281. He won the fight by unanimous decision. This fight earned him a $100,000 Fight of the Night award.

== Fighting style ==
Du Plessis operates primarily from an orthodox stance, utilizing constant forward pressure and a high volume of strikes to the head, body, and legs. Despite analysts describing his striking and takedowns as unorthodox, du Plessis has defended his style as prioritizing effectiveness over traditional technique. This high-pressure approach was notable in his title-winning bout against Sean Strickland at UFC 297, where he secured a split-decision victory.

In the buildup to his fights, du Plessis frequently utilizes trash talk. His press conference exchanges have led to heated confrontations, including a physical altercation in the crowd with Strickland prior to their bout at UFC 297, and a tense face-off with Israel Adesanya at UFC 290.

== Personal life ==
Du Plessis is bilingual; he speaks English and Afrikaans.

In April 2023, du Plessis underwent surgery to fix a breathing impairment in his nose. According to his coach Morne Visser, du Plessis had been competing in the UFC with "only 8% oxygen" intake through his nostrils. The surgery was originally scheduled for 2020 but was put on hold after du Plessis signed with the UFC. In 2024, it was revealed that Visser would use a taser on du Plessis and other fighters' feet as a training method, using the electric shock as punishment for underperformance in the gym.

In February 2025, du Plessis stated at a press conference that the re-election of Donald Trump in the United States was "incredible", calling him "an amazing president". Du Plessis additionally lauded "fellow South African Elon Musk for also doing the right thing".

Du Plessis proposed to his fiancée Vasti Spiller on 14 January 2025, his 31st birthday.

== Championships and accomplishments ==
=== Kickboxing ===
- World Association of Kickboxing Organizations
  - 2012 Junior World Championships - (gold) 1st place, -86 kg (K-1 rules)

=== Mixed martial arts ===
- Ultimate Fighting Championship
  - UFC Middleweight Championship (One time; former)
    - Two successful title defences
    - First South African fighter to win a UFC championship
    - Tied (Rich Franklin) for fourth most UFC middleweight title wins (3)
  - Fight of the Night (Three times) vs. Darren Till, Sean Strickland 1 and Kamaru Usman
  - Performance of the Night (Two times) vs. Trevin Giles and Robert Whittaker
  - Tied (Chris Weidman) for third longest win streak in UFC Middleweight division history (9)
  - Holds wins over four former UFC champions — vs. Robert Whittaker, Israel Adesanya, Sean Strickland (x2) and Kamaru Usman
  - UFC Honors Awards
    - 2024: Fan's Choice Submission of the Year Nominee vs. Israel Adesanya
  - UFC.com Awards
    - 2023: Ranked #9 Upset of the Year vs. Robert Whittaker
    - 2024: Ranked #5 Fighter of the Year, Ranked #4 Submission of the Year vs. Israel Adesanya & Ranked #10 Fight of the Year vs. Israel Adesanya
- Extreme Fighting Championship
  - EFC Middleweight Champion (One time; former)
    - One title defence
  - EFC Welterweight Champion (One time; former)
    - One title defence
- Konfrontacja Sztuk Walki
  - KSW Welterweight Champion (One time; former)
  - Fight of the Night (One time) vs. Roberto Soldić
  - Performance of the Night (One time) vs. Roberto Soldić
- World MMA Awards
  - 2024 International Fighter of the Year
- Combat Press
  - 2023 Breakout Fighter of the Year
- ESPN
  - 2024 Submission of the Year vs. Israel Adesanya
- MMA Fighting
  - 2023 Second Team MMA All-Star
  - 2024 First Team MMA All-Star
- MMA Mania
  - 2024 #3 Ranked Fighter of the Year
- Sportsnaut
  - 2023 UFC Breakout Fighter of the Year

== Mixed martial arts record ==
Professional record breakdown
27 matches	24 wins	3 losses
By knockout	9	1
By submission	11	1
By decision	4	1

Res.	Record	Opponent	Method	Event	Date	Round	Time	Location	Notes
Win	24–3	Kamaru Usman	Decision (unanimous)	UFC Fight Night: du Plessis vs. Usman	18 July 2026	5	5:00	Oklahoma City, Oklahoma, United States	Fight of the Night.
Loss	23–3	Khamzat Chimaev	Decision (unanimous)	UFC 319	16 August 2025	5	5:00	Chicago, Illinois, United States	Lost the UFC Middleweight Championship.
Win	23–2	Sean Strickland	Decision (unanimous)	UFC 312	9 February 2025	5	5:00	Sydney, Australia	Defended the UFC Middleweight Championship.
Win	22–2	Israel Adesanya	Submission (face crank)	UFC 305	18 August 2024	4	3:38	Perth, Australia	Defended the UFC Middleweight Championship.
Win	21–2	Sean Strickland	Decision (split)	UFC 297	20 January 2024	5	5:00	Toronto, Ontario, Canada	Won the UFC Middleweight Championship. Fight of the Night.
Win	20–2	Robert Whittaker	TKO (punches)	UFC 290	8 July 2023	2	2:23	Las Vegas, Nevada, United States	UFC Middleweight title eliminator. Performance of the Night.
Win	19–2	Derek Brunson	TKO (corner stoppage)	UFC 285	4 March 2023	2	4:59	Las Vegas, Nevada, United States	
Win	18–2	Darren Till	Submission (face crank)	UFC 282	10 December 2022	3	2:43	Las Vegas, Nevada, United States	Fight of the Night.
Win	17–2	Brad Tavares	Decision (unanimous)	UFC 276	2 July 2022	3	5:00	Las Vegas, Nevada, United States	
Win	16–2	Trevin Giles	KO (punches)	UFC 264	10 July 2021	2	1:41	Las Vegas, Nevada, United States	Performance of the Night.
Win	15–2	Markus Perez	KO (punches)	UFC Fight Night: Moraes vs. Sandhagen	11 October 2020	1	3:22	Abu Dhabi, United Arab Emirates	
Win	14–2	Brendan Lesar	Submission (guillotine choke)	EFC Worldwide 83	14 December 2019	1	4:15	Pretoria, South Africa	Defended and unified the EFC Middleweight Championship.
Win	13–2	Joilton Santos	TKO (punches)	KSW 50	14 September 2019	2	3:04	London, England	Return to Middleweight.
Loss	12–2	Roberto Soldić	KO (punches)	KSW 45	6 October 2018	3	2:33	London, England	Lost the KSW Welterweight Championship. Fight of the Night.
Win	12–1	Roberto Soldić	TKO (punches)	KSW 43	14 April 2018	2	1:37	Wrocław, Poland	Return to Welterweight. Won the KSW Welterweight Championship. Performance of the Night.
Win	11–1	Yannick Bahati	Submission (guillotine choke)	EFC Worldwide 62	19 August 2017	1	1:30	Johannesburg, South Africa	Won the EFC Middleweight Championship.
Win	10–1	José Maurício da Rocha Jr.	TKO (punches)	EFC Worldwide 59	13 May 2017	1	3:58	Johannesburg, South Africa	Defended the EFC Welterweight Championship.
Win	9–1	Rafał Haratyk	Submission (guillotine choke)	EFC Worldwide 56	9 December 2016	2	3:34	Brakpan, South Africa	Middleweight bout.
Win	8–1	Martin van Staden	Submission (guillotine choke)	EFC Worldwide 50	17 June 2016	3	3:59	Sun City, South Africa	Won the vacant EFC Welterweight Championship.
Win	7–1	Bruno Mukulu	Submission (rear-naked choke)	EFC Worldwide 46	12 December 2015	2	2:50	Brakpan, South Africa	Catchweight (176 lb) bout.
Win	6–1	Dino Bagattin	Submission (rear-naked choke)	EFC Worldwide 40	6 June 2015	2	3:33	Brakpan, South Africa	Welterweight debut.
Win	5–1	Darren Daniel	Submission (rear-naked choke)	EFC Africa 37	21 February 2015	1	4:50	Brakpan, South Africa	
Loss	4–1	Garreth McLellan	Submission (guillotine choke)	EFC Africa 33	30 August 2014	3	2:12	Durban, South Africa	For the EFC Middleweight Championship.
Win	4–0	Donavin Hawkey	TKO (punches)	EFC Africa 27	27 February 2014	1	4:50	Brakpan, South Africa	
Win	3–0	JC Lamprecht	Submission (rear-naked choke)	EFC Africa 24	10 October 2013	3	1:54	Brakpan, South Africa	
Win	2–0	Bruno Mukulu	Submission (rear-naked choke)	EFC Africa 23	12 September 2013	1	2:34	Brakpan, South Africa	
Win	1–0	Tshikangu Makuebo	TKO (knee injury)	EFC Africa 21	25 July 2013	1	1:18	Brakpan, South Africa	Middleweight debut.

== Pay-per-view bouts ==
No.	Event	Fight	Date	Venue	City	PPV buys
1.	UFC 297	Strickland vs. du Plessis	20 January 2024	Scotiabank Arena	Toronto, Ontario, Canada	Not Disclosed
2.	UFC 305	du Plessis vs. Adesanya	18 August 2024	RAC Arena	Perth, Australia	Not Disclosed
3.	UFC 312	du Plessis vs. Strickland 2	9 February 2025	Qudos Bank Arena	Sydney, Australia	Not Disclosed
4.	UFC 319	du Plessis vs. Chimaev	16 August 2025	United Center	Chicago, Illinois, United States	Not Disclosed

== See also ==
- List of current UFC fighters
- List of male mixed martial artists

Awards and achievements
Preceded by Sean Strickland	15th UFC Middleweight Champion; 20 January 2024 – 16 August 2025	Succeeded by Khamzat Chimaev
