= UFC on ESPN: Cannonier vs. Borralho =

Mixed martial arts event in 2024

- The poster for UFC on ESPN: Cannonier vs. Borralho
- Promotion: Ultimate Fighting Championship
- Date: August 24, 2024
- Venue: UFC Apex
- City: Enterprise, Nevada, United States
- Attendance: Not announced

Event chronology
UFC 305: du Plessis vs. Adesanya	UFC on ESPN: Cannonier vs. Borralho	UFC Fight Night: Burns vs. Brady

UFC on ESPN: Cannonier vs. Borralho (also known as UFC on ESPN 62 and UFC Vegas 96) was a mixed martial arts event produced by the Ultimate Fighting Championship that took place on August 24, 2024, at the UFC Apex in Enterprise, Nevada, part of the Las Vegas Valley, United States..

== Background ==
A middleweight bout between former UFC Middleweight Championship challenger Jared Cannonier and Caio Borralho headlined the event.

The featherweight and middleweight finals of The Ultimate Fighter: Team Grasso vs. Team Shevchenko took place at the event.

A middleweight bout between Roman Kopylov and Brunno Ferreira was scheduled for this event. However, Kopylov withdrew from the fight after appendicitis surgery and the bout was scrapped.

A featherweight bout between Danny Silva and Dennis Buzukja was expected to take place at the event. However, Silva withdrew due to injury and was replaced by Francis Marshall in a lightweight bout.

A featherweight bout between Žygimantas Ramaška and Nathan Fletcher was scheduled for this event. Despite both men successfully weighing in, it was announced that the fight was canceled due to an undisclosed medical issue on Fletcher’s part. The bout has been re-scheduled to take place at the next event, UFC Fight Night: Burns vs. Brady, two weeks later.

== Results ==
Main card (ESPN / ESPN+)
Weight class				Method	Round	Time	Notes
Middleweight	Caio Borralho	def.	Jared Cannonier	Decision (unanimous) (49–45, 49–45, 48–46)	5	5:00
Women's Strawweight	Tabatha Ricci	def.	Angela Hill	Decision (unanimous) (29–28, 29–28, 29–28)	3	5:00
Middleweight	Ryan Loder	def.	Robert Valentin	TKO (elbows)	2	1:49	(Note: The Ultimate Fighter 32 middleweight tournament final.)
Featherweight	Mairon Santos	def.	Kaan Ofli	KO (punch)	2	1:30	(Note: The Ultimate Fighter 32 featherweight tournament final.)
Welterweight	Michael Morales	def.	Neil Magny	TKO (punches)	1	4:39
Middleweight	Gerald Meerschaert	def.	Edmen Shahbazyan	Submission (arm-triangle choke)	2	4:12
Preliminary card (ESPN+)
Lightweight	Francis Marshall	def.	Dennis Buzukja	Decision (split) (28–29, 30–27, 29–28)	3	5:00
Middleweight	Zachary Reese	def.	José Medina	Decision (unanimous) (30–27, 30–27, 30–27)	3	5:00
Lightweight	Viacheslav Borshchev	def.	James Llontop	Decision (split) (28–29, 29–28, 30–27)	3	5:00
Women's Bantamweight	Jacqueline Cavalcanti	def.	Josiane Nunes	Decision (split) (27–30, 29–28, 29–28)	3	5:00
Women's Flyweight	Wang Cong	def.	Victoria Leonardo	KO (punches)	1	1:02

== Bonus awards ==
The following fighters received $50,000 bonuses.

- Fight of the Night: Caio Borralho vs. Jared Cannonier
- Performance of the Night: Michael Morales, Gerald Meerschaert and Wang Cong

== See also ==
- 2024 in UFC
- List of current UFC fighters
- List of UFC events
