= Daniel Zellhuber =

Mexican mixed martial artist (born 1999)

- Born: Daniel Olvera Zellhuber; July 7, 1999 (age 27); Mexico City, Mexico
- Other names: Golden Boy
- Height: 6 ft 1 in (1.85 m)
- Weight: 155 lb (70 kg; 11 st 1 lb)
- Division: Lightweight
- Reach: 77 in (196 cm)
- Style: Wrestling
- Fighting out of: Mexico City, Mexico
- Team: Xtreme Couture
- Years active: 2016–present

Mixed martial arts record
- Total: 19
- Wins: 15
- By knockout: 7
- By submission: 3
- By decision: 5
- Losses: 4
- By knockout: 1
- By decision: 3

Other information
- Mixed martial arts record from Sherdog

Daniel Olvera Zellhuber (born July 7, 1999) is a Mexican professional mixed martial artist who currently competes in the Lightweight division of the Ultimate Fighting Championship (UFC).

== Mixed martial arts career ==
=== Early career ===
His professional MMA career took place on September 24, 2016, at Jasaji Fighting League. Zellhuber faced, and defeated via technical knockout, Sergio Vazquez. Since then, he would compile an undefeated 11–0 before making the jump to the big leagues.

=== Dana White's Contender Series ===
Zellhuber would participate in the fifth season of Dana White's Contender Series. On September 21, 2021, he faced Brazilian Lucas Almeida, winning the fight via unanimous decision. As a result, Zellhuber earned a contract with the UFC.

=== Ultimate Fighting Championship ===
Zellhuber debuted in the UFC on September 17, 2022, facing Trey Ogden at the UFC Fight Night 210 event. He lost the fight via unanimous decision.

Zellhuber faced Lando Vannata on April 15, 2023, at UFC on ESPN 44. He won the fight via unanimous decision.

Zellhuber faced Christos Giagos on September 16, 2023, at UFC Fight Night 227. He won the fight via submission with an anaconda choke in the second round. This fight earned him a Performance of the Night award.

Zellhuber faced Francisco Prado on February 24, 2024, at UFC Fight Night 237. He won the fight via unanimous decision. The win also earned Zellhuber his first Fight of the Night bonus award.

Zellhuber faced Esteban Ribovics on September 14, 2024, at UFC 306. He lost the fight by split decision. This fight earned him another Fight of the Night award.

Zellhuber was scheduled to face Elves Brener on March 29, 2025, at UFC on ESPN 64. However, Brener withdrew from the fight and was replaced by Austin Hubbard. In turn, Zellhuber was pulled from the card due to injury and was removed from the card.

Zellhuber faced Michael Johnson on July 19, 2025, at UFC 318. He lost the fight by unanimous decision.

Zellhuber faced King Green on February 28, 2026, at UFC Fight Night 268. He lost the fight by technical knockout at the end of the second round.

== Championships and accomplishments ==
- Ultimate Fighting Championship
  - Fight of the Night (Two times) vs. Francisco Prado and Esteban Ribovics
  - Performance of the Night (One time) vs. Christos Giagos
  - UFC Honors Awards
    - 2024: President's Choice Fight of the Year Nominee vs. Esteban Ribovics
  - UFC.com Awards
    - 2024: Fight of the Year vs. Esteban Ribovics
- LowKick MMA
  - 2024 Fight of the Year vs. Esteban Ribovics at UFC 306
- Bleacher Report
  - 2024 Fight of the Year Esteban Ribovics
- Full Violence Awards
  - 2024 Fight of the Year vs. Esteban Ribovics at UFC 306
- MMA Fighting
  - 2024 Round of the Year vs. Esteban Ribovics
- MMA Junkie
  - 2024 Fight of the Year vs. Esteban Ribovics
- CBS Sports
  - 2024 UFC Fight of the Year vs. Esteban Ribovics
- Cageside Press
  - 2024 Fight of the Year vs. Esteban Ribovics
- BodySlam.net
  - 2024 Fight of the Year vs. Esteban Ribovics
- MMA Mania
  - 2024 #2 Ranked Fight of the Year vs. Esteban Ribovics

== Mixed martial arts record ==
Professional record breakdown
19 matches	15 wins	4 losses
By knockout	7	1
By submission	3	0
By decision	5	3

Res.	Record	Opponent	Method	Event	Date	Round	Time	Location	Notes
Loss	15–4	King Green	TKO (punches)	UFC Fight Night: Moreno vs. Kavanagh	February 28, 2026	2	4:55	Mexico City, Mexico	
Loss	15–3	Michael Johnson	Decision (unanimous)	UFC 318	July 19, 2025	3	5:00	New Orleans, Louisiana, United States	
Loss	15–2	Esteban Ribovics	Decision (split)	UFC 306	September 14, 2024	3	5:00	Las Vegas, Nevada, United States	Fight of the Night.
Win	15–1	Francisco Prado	Decision (unanimous)	UFC Fight Night: Moreno vs. Royval 2	February 24, 2024	3	5:00	Mexico City, Mexico	Fight of the Night.
Win	14–1	Christos Giagos	Submission (anaconda choke)	UFC Fight Night: Grasso vs. Shevchenko 2	September 16, 2023	2	3:26	Las Vegas, Nevada, United States	Performance of the Night.
Win	13–1	Lando Vannata	Decision (unanimous)	UFC on ESPN: Holloway vs. Allen	April 15, 2023	3	5:00	Kansas City, Missouri, United States	
Loss	12–1	Trey Ogden	Decision (unanimous)	UFC Fight Night: Sandhagen vs. Song	September 17, 2022	3	5:00	Las Vegas, Nevada, United States	
Win	12–0	Lucas Almeida	Decision (unanimous)	Dana White's Contender Series 41	September 28, 2021	3	5:00	Las Vegas, Nevada, United States	
Win	11–0	Martin Gonzalez	TKO (punches)	LUX 013	May 7, 2021	1	1:12	Monterrey, Mexico	Catchweight (163 lb) bout.
Win	10–0	Alexander Barahona	TKO (elbows and punches)	iKON Fighting Federation 4	December 11, 2020	1	2:17	San Carlos Nuevo Guaymas, Mexico	
Win	9–0	Miguel Arizmendi	Submission (calf slicer)	LUX 010	September 18, 2020	1	4:45	Nuevo León, Mexico	
Win	8–0	Gian Franco Cortez	TKO (punches)	Combate Americas 38	May 31, 2019	3	1:32	Lima, Peru	
Win	7–0	Salvador Izar	TKO (knee and punches)	Combate Americas 28	November 17, 2018	1	1:32	Monterrey, Mexico	
Win	6–0	Luis Medrano	Decision (unanimous)	Combate Americas 21	April 20, 2018	3	5:00	Monterrey, Mexico	
Win	5–0	Brandon Vega	Submission (triangle choke)	Jasaji Fighting League: Fight Night Volume 3	October 28, 2017	1	2:45	Tlalnepantla de Baz, Mexico	Return to Lightweight.
Win	4–0	Jonathan Fuentes	TKO (punches)	Lutador Expertos del Combate 2	July 28, 2017	2	1:10	Tlalnepantla de Baz, Mexico	Welterweight debut.
Win	3–0	Irving Antonio Uriarte	TKO (punches)	Jasaji Fighting League: Fight Night Volume 1	May 27, 2017	1	3:00	Tlalnepantla de Baz, Mexico	
Win	2–0	Ivan Plascencia	Decision (unanimous)	Jasaji Fighting League 15	March 18, 2017	3	5:00	Tlalnepantla de Baz, Mexico	
Win	1–0	Sergio Vazquez	TKO (punches)	Jasaji Fighting League 13	September 24, 2016	2	1:00	Tlalnepantla de Baz, Mexico	Lightweight debut.

== See also ==
- List of current UFC fighters
- List of Dana White's Contender Series alumni
- List of Mexican UFC fighters
- List of male mixed martial artists
