= Fatima Kline =

American mixed martial artist (born 2000)

- Born: Fatima Michele Kline; July 12, 2000 (age 26); Holbrook, New York, United States
- Nickname: The Archangel
- Height: 5 ft 6 in (1.68 m)
- Weight: 115 lb (52 kg; 8.2 st)
- Division: Strawweight
- Reach: 67 in (170 cm)
- Fighting out of: Hyde Park, New York, U.S.
- Team: MK Muay Thai; Silver Fox BJJ
- Years active: 2021–present

Mixed martial arts record
- Total: 11
- Wins: 10
- By knockout: 4
- By submission: 1
- By decision: 5
- Losses: 1
- By decision: 1

Other information
- Mixed martial arts record from Sherdog

Fatima Michele Kline (born July 12, 2000) is an American mixed martial artist who competes in the women's Strawweight division of the Ultimate Fighting Championship (UFC). She previously fought for Invicta Fighting Championships and Cage Fury Fighting Championships, where she was the Women's Strawweight and Women's Flyweight Champion. As of July 18, 2026, she is #6 in the Meta UFC women's strawweight rankings.

== Mixed martial arts career ==
=== Early career ===
Kline started her MMA career in Invicta FC in their strawweight division, achieving a 4–0 record.

Branching into Cage Fury FC and making her flyweight debut, Kline fought and won against Sara Cova via 3rd-round knockout for the promotion's vacant women's flyweight championship.

Returning to strawweight, Kline would once again fight for a championship in Cage Fury FC, this time for the vacant women's strawweight championship against Andressa Romero. She won by unanimous decision.

=== Ultimate Fighting Championship ===
Kline was signed on short notice by the UFC to face Jasmine Jasudavicius on July 13, 2024, in a flyweight bout at UFC on ESPN 59, replacing Viviane Araújo. She lost by unanimous decision.

Returning to strawweight, Kline faced Victoria Dudakova on January 11, 2025, at UFC Fight Night 249. She won through knockout via elbows in the second round.

Kline faced Melissa Martinez on July 12, 2025, at UFC on ESPN 70. After a right-hand punch, Kline knocked out Martinez with a head kick in the third round. This earned her a Performance of the Night award.

Kline faced Angela Hill on November 15, 2025, at UFC 322. She won by unanimous decision.

Kline was scheduled to face Amanda Ribas on July 18, 2026, at UFC Fight Night 281. However, Ribas withdrew due to dizziness and was replaced by Tabatha Ricci. Kline won the fight by unanimous decision.

== Championships and accomplishments ==
- Ultimate Fighting Championship
  - Performance of the Night (One time) vs. Melissa Martinez
- Cage Fury Fighting Championships
  - Cage Fury Women's Flyweight Championship (former)
  - Cage Fury Women's Strawweight Championship (former)

== Mixed martial arts record ==
Professional record breakdown
11 matches	10 wins	1 loss
By knockout	4	0
By submission	1	0
By decision	5	1

Res.	Record	Opponent	Method	Event	Date	Round	Time	Location	Notes
Win	10–1	Tabatha Ricci	Decision (unanimous)	UFC Fight Night: du Plessis vs. Usman	July 18, 2026	3	5:00	Oklahoma City, Oklahoma, United States	
Win	9–1	Angela Hill	Decision (unanimous)	UFC 322	November 15, 2025	3	5:00	New York City, New York, United States	
Win	8–1	Melissa Martinez	TKO (head kick and punches)	UFC on ESPN: Lewis vs. Teixeira	July 12, 2025	3	2:36	Nashville, Tennessee, United States	Performance of the Night.
Win	7–1	Victoria Dudakova	TKO (elbows)	UFC Fight Night: Dern vs. Ribas 2	January 11, 2025	2	4:27	Las Vegas, Nevada, United States	
Loss	6–1	Jasmine Jasudavicius	Decision (unanimous)	UFC on ESPN: Namajunas vs. Cortez	July 13, 2024	3	5:00	Denver, Colorado, United States	Flyweight bout.
Win	6–0	Andressa Romero	Decision (unanimous)	Cage Fury FC 129	February 9, 2024	4	5:00	Philadelphia, Pennsylvania, United States	Return to Strawweight. Won the vacant Cage Fury FC Women's Strawweight Championship.
Win	5–0	Sara Cova	TKO (punches)	Cage Fury FC 127	November 3, 2023	3	3:56	Tunica, Mississippi, United States	Flyweight debut. Won the vacant Cage Fury FC Women's Flyweight Championship.
Win	4–0	Natalia Kuziutina	Decision (unanimous)	Invicta FC 52	March 15, 2023	3	5:00	Denver, Colorado, United States	
Win	3–0	Laura Gallardo	Decision (unanimous)	Invicta FC 51	January 18, 2023	3	5:00	Denver, Colorado, United States	
Win	2–0	Sidney Trillo	TKO (punches)	Invicta FC 47	May 11, 2022	3	4:45	Kansas City, Kansas, United States	
Win	1–0	Ariana Melendez	Submission (rear-naked choke)	Invicta FC on AXS TV: Rodríguez vs. Torquato	May 21, 2021	1	3:00	Kansas City, Kansas, United States	Strawweight debut.
