= UFC 285 =

2023 mixed martial arts event

UFC 285: Jones vs. Gane
- The poster for UFC 285: Jones vs. Gane
- Promotion: Ultimate Fighting Championship
- Date: March 4, 2023
- Venue: T-Mobile Arena
- City: Paradise, Nevada, United States
- Attendance: 19,471
- Total gate: $12,154,753.10.

Event chronology
UFC Fight Night: Muniz vs. Allen	UFC 285: Jones vs. Gane	UFC Fight Night: Yan vs. Dvalishvili

UFC 285: Jones vs. Gane was a mixed martial arts event produced by the Ultimate Fighting Championship that took place on March 4, 2023, at T-Mobile Arena in Paradise, Nevada, part of the Las Vegas metropolitan area, United States.

== Background ==
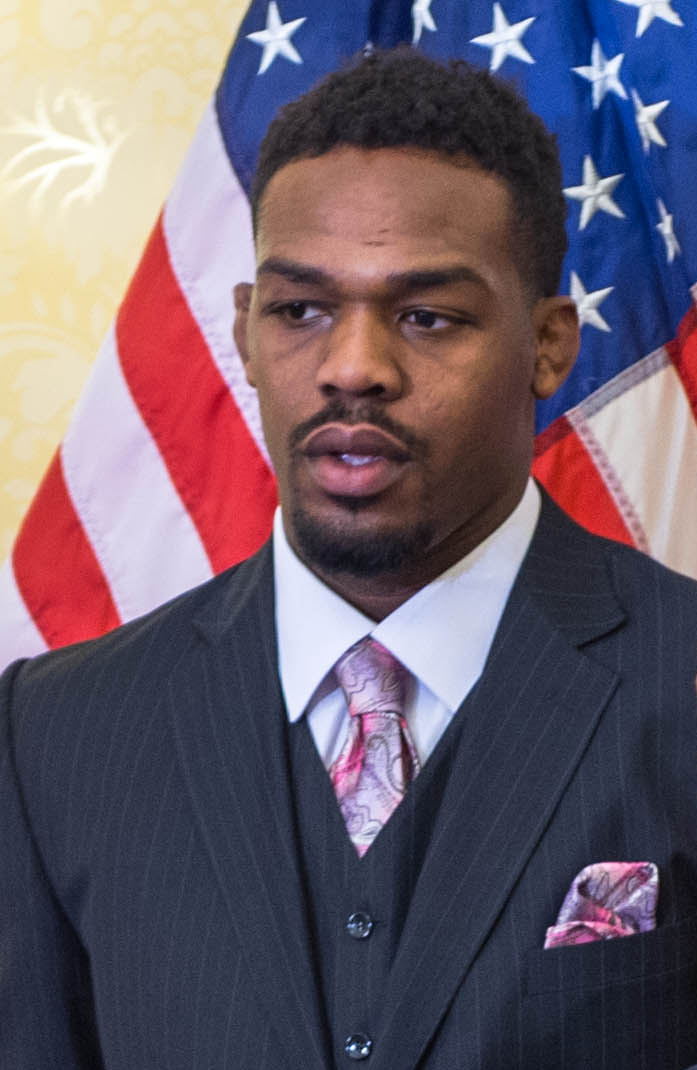
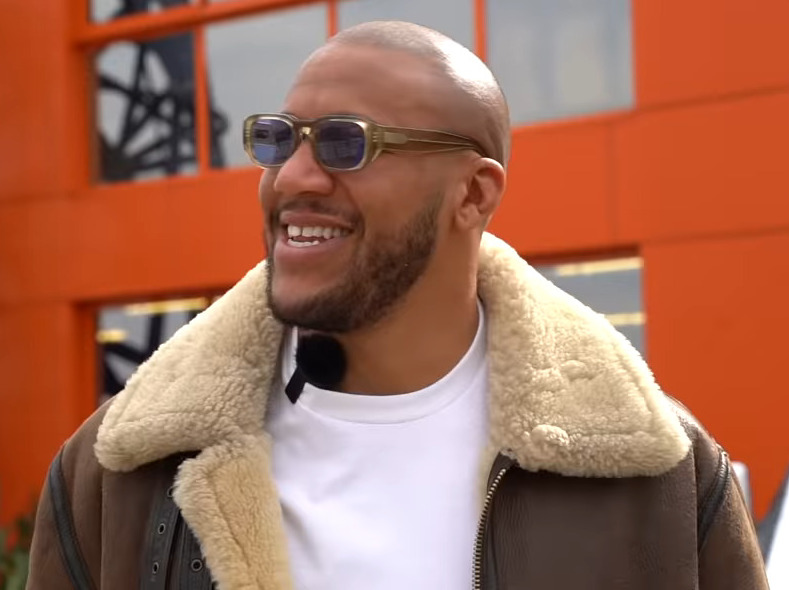
Jones (left) became the eighth multi-division champion in the promotion's history, as well as the third man to become heavyweight and light heavyweight champion. If victorious, Gane (right) would have become the UFC's first ever French undisputed champion.

A UFC Heavyweight Championship bout for the vacant title between former two-time UFC Light Heavyweight Champion Jon Jones and former interim champion Ciryl Gane headlined the event. Former champion Francis Ngannou was stripped of the title on January 14 and released from the promotion due to a contract dispute. Sergei Pavlovich served as backup and potential replacement for this fight.

A UFC Women's Flyweight Championship bout between current champion Valentina Shevchenko and Alexa Grasso served as the event's co-main event.

A women's strawweight bout between former UFC Women's Strawweight Championship challenger and inaugural Invicta FC Atomweight Champion Jessica Penne and Tabatha Ricci took place at the event. They were previously scheduled to meet at UFC Fight Night: Dern vs. Yan but the bout was scrapped as Penne withdrew due to illness.

A welterweight bout between Geoff Neal and Shavkat Rakhmonov took place at this event. They were previously expected to meet at UFC Fight Night: Strickland vs. Imavov but Neal withdrew due to injury. At the weigh-ins, Neal weighed in at 175 pounds, four pounds over the welterweight non-title fight limit. The bout proceeded at catchweight and Neal was fined 30% of his purse, which went to Rakhmonov.

A middleweight bout between promotional newcomer Bo Nickal and Jamie Pickett took place at this event. They were previously expected to meet at UFC 282 but Nickal withdrew due to injury.

A bantamweight bout between former UFC Bantamweight Champion Cody Garbrandt and Julio Arce was expected to take place at the event. However, Arce withdrew in late January due to a knee injury and was replaced by Trevin Jones.

A lightweight bout between Jalin Turner and Dan Hooker was scheduled for the event. However, Hooker was forced to withdraw from the event citing a hand injury. He was replaced by former KSW Featherweight and Lightweight Champion Mateusz Gamrot.

A lightweight bout between Kamuela Kirk and Esteban Ribovics was scheduled for the event. However, Kirk withdrew from the event for undisclosed reasons and was replaced by Loik Radzhabov.

Also at the weigh-ins, Leomana Martinez weighed in at 137 pounds, one pound over the bantamweight non-title fight limit. The bout proceeded at catchweight with Martinez being fined 30% of his purse, which went to his opponent Cameron Saaiman.

Road House, a remake of the 1989 film of the same name, had some of its scenes filmed during fight week, featuring actor Jake Gyllenhaal and UFC veteran Jay Hieron. It included a weigh-in scene and an actual fight sequence that was shot after the last bout of the early preliminary card, including UFC cage announcer Bruce Buffer and MMA referee Chris Tognoni.

== Results ==
Main card
Weight class				Method	Round	Time	Notes
Heavyweight	Jon Jones	def.	Ciryl Gane	Submission (guillotine choke)	1	2:04	(Note: For the vacant UFC Heavyweight Championship.)
Women's Flyweight	Alexa Grasso	def.	Valentina Shevchenko (c)	Submission (face crank)	4	4:34	(Note: For the UFC Women's Flyweight Championship.)
Catchweight (175 lb)	Shavkat Rakhmonov	def.	Geoff Neal	Submission (rear-naked choke)	3	4:17
Lightweight	Mateusz Gamrot	def.	Jalin Turner	Decision (split) (29–28, 28–29, 30–27)	3	5:00
Middleweight	Bo Nickal	def.	Jamie Pickett	Submission (arm-triangle choke)	1	2:54
Preliminary card (ESPNews / ESPN+)
Bantamweight	Cody Garbrandt	def.	Trevin Jones	Decision (unanimous) (29–28, 29–28, 29–28)	3	5:00
Middleweight	Dricus du Plessis	def.	Derek Brunson	TKO (corner stoppage)	2	4:59
Women's Flyweight	Amanda Ribas	def.	Viviane Araújo	Decision (unanimous) (29–27, 30–26, 30–27)	3	5:00
Middleweight	Marc-André Barriault	def.	Julian Marquez	TKO (punches)	2	4:12
Early preliminary card (ESPN+ / UFC Fight Pass)
Welterweight	Ian Machado Garry	def.	Song Kenan	TKO (punches)	3	4:22
Catchweight (137 lb)	Cameron Saaiman	def.	Leomana Martinez	Decision (majority) (29–26, 28–27, 28–28)	3	5:00	(Note: Saaimann was deducted 1 point in round 1 due to multiple groin strikes.)
Women's Strawweight	Tabatha Ricci	def.	Jessica Penne	Submission (armbar)	2	2:14
Bantamweight	Farid Basharat	def.	Da'Mon Blackshear	Decision (unanimous) (29–28, 29–28, 29–28)	3	5:00
Lightweight	Loik Radzhabov	def.	Esteban Ribovics	Decision (unanimous) (29–28, 29–28, 29–28)	3	5:00

== Bonus awards ==
The following fighters received $50,000 bonuses.

- Fight of the Night: Shavkat Rakhmonov vs. Geoff Neal (Note: Despite missing weight, Neal was still awarded his share of the bonus.)
- Performance of the Night: Jon Jones, Alexa Grasso, and Bo Nickal

== Aftermath ==
This event won the Fans Choice UFC Honors 2023 Event of the Year.

== See also ==
- List of UFC events
- List of current UFC fighters
- 2023 in UFC
