= Cameron Saaiman =

South African mixed martial artist

- Born: Cameron Alexander Saaiman; 20 December 2000 (age 25); Pretoria, South Africa
- Height: 5 ft 8 in (1.73 m)
- Weight: 135 lb (61 kg; 9 st 9 lb)
- Division: Bantamweight
- Reach: 67 in (170 cm)
- Stance: Southpaw
- Fighting out of: Pretoria, South Africa
- Team: Team CIT MMA
- Years active: 2019–present

Mixed martial arts record
- Total: 12
- Wins: 9
- By knockout: 6
- By submission: 1
- By decision: 2
- Losses: 3
- By knockout: 2
- By decision: 1

Other information
- Mixed martial arts record from Sherdog

Cameron Alexander Saaiman (born 20 December 2000) is a South African mixed martial artist who competes in the Bantamweight division of the Ultimate Fighting Championship (UFC).

== Background ==
Saaiman was born on 20 December 2000 in Pretoria, South Africa. He began training in kickboxing and mixed martial arts at the age of 12. Saaiman was a South African champion in K-1 kickboxing before focusing on MMA. His nickname, MSP, stands for "Most Savage Player" and was given to him by his coach.

== Mixed martial arts career ==
=== Early career ===
Saaiman won his first five MMA bouts in the South African promotion Extreme Fighting Championship. In his fifth fight, Saaiman defeated Sindile Manengela by unanimous decision to win the EFC Bantamweight Championship.

On 23 August 2022, Saaiman faced Josh Wang-Kim at Dana White's Contender Series 51. Saaiman knocked out Wang-Kim with a punch in the third round and was awarded a contract with the UFC for his performance.

=== Ultimate Fighting Championship ===
Saaiman was scheduled to make his UFC debut against Ronnie Lawrence on 10 December 2022 at UFC 282. However, Lawrence withdrew and was replaced by Steven Koslow. Saaiman won the fight by technical knockout in round three. This fight earned him a Performance of the Night award.

Saaiman then faced Leomana Martinez on 4 March 2023 at UFC 285. He was deducted a point in round two for a low blow, but nonetheless won the fight via majority decision.

Saaiman was scheduled to face Christian Rodriguez on 8 July 2023 at UFC 290. However, Rodriguez pulled out in late June due to injury and was replaced by promotional newcomer and former The Ultimate Fighter: Tournament of Champions cast member Terrence Mitchell. He won the fight via technical knockout in the first round.

The match between Saaiman and Christian Rodriguez was rescheduled for 14 October 2023, at UFC Fight Night 230. At the weigh-ins, Rodriguez weighed in at 140 pounds, four pounds over the bantamweight non-title fight limit. The bout proceeded at catchweight and Rodriguez was fined a percentage of his purse, which went to Saaiman. Saaiman lost the fight via unanimous decision.

Saaiman faced Payton Talbott on 23 March 2024, at UFC on ESPN 53. He lost the bout in the second round via technical knockout.

Saaiman faced promotional newcomer Malcolm Wellmaker on 26 April 2025 at UFC on ESPN 66. He lost the fight by knockout in the first round.

== Championships and accomplishments ==
=== Mixed martial arts ===
- Ultimate Fighting Championship
  - Performance of the Night (One time) vs. Steven Koslow
- Extreme Fighting Championship
  - EFC Bantamweight Championship (One time)

== Mixed martial arts record ==
Professional record breakdown
12 matches	9 wins	3 losses
By knockout	6	2
By submission	1	0
By decision	2	1

Res.	Record	Opponent	Method	Event	Date	Round	Time	Location	Notes
Loss	9–3	Malcolm Wellmaker	KO (punch)	UFC on ESPN: Machado Garry vs. Prates	April 26, 2025	1	1:59	Kansas City, Missouri, United States	
Loss	9–2	Payton Talbott	TKO (punches)	UFC on ESPN: Ribas vs. Namajunas	March 23, 2024	2	0:21	Las Vegas, Nevada, United States	
Loss	9–1	Christian Rodriguez	Decision (unanimous)	UFC Fight Night: Yusuff vs. Barboza	October 14, 2023	3	5:00	Las Vegas, Nevada, United States	Catchweight (140 lb) bout; Rodriguez missed weight.
Win	9–0	Terrence Mitchell	TKO (punches)	UFC 290	July 8, 2023	1	3:10	Las Vegas, Nevada, United States	
Win	8–0	Leomana Martinez	Decision (majority)	UFC 285	March 4, 2023	3	5:00	Las Vegas, Nevada, United States	Catchweight (137 lb) bout; Martinez missed weight. Saaiman was deducted 1 point in round 1 due to multiple groin strikes.
Win	7–0	Steven Koslow	TKO (knees and punches)	UFC 282	December 10, 2022	3	4:13	Las Vegas, Nevada, United States	Saaiman was deducted 1 point in round 2 due to an illegal knee. Performance of the Night.
Win	6–0	Josh Wang-Kim	KO (punch)	Dana White's Contender Series 51	August 23, 2022	3	2:52	Las Vegas, Nevada, United States	
Win	5–0	Sindile Manengela	Decision (unanimous)	EFC 94	June 4, 2022	5	5:00	Johannesburg, South Africa	Won the vacant EFC Bantamweight Championship.
Win	4–0	Roevan De Beer	TKO (punches)	EFC 92	March 5, 2022	1	N/A	Johannesburg, South Africa	
Win	3–0	Billy Oosthuizen	Submission (rear-naked choke)	EFC 85	May 8, 2021	2	2:05	Johannesburg, South Africa	
Win	2–0	Zwelibanzi Ngema	TKO (punches)	EFC 84	March 14, 2020	2	3:29	Pretoria, South Africa	
Win	1–0	Corne Blom	TKO (punches)	EFC 83	December 14, 2019	1	1:25	Pretoria, South Africa	Bantamweight debut.

== See also ==
- List of current UFC fighters
- List of male mixed martial artists
