= Esteban Ribovics =

Argentine mixed martial artist (born 1996)

- Born: Esteban Ribovics Marijan; 27 April 1996 (age 30); Tartagal, Salta, Argentina
- Other names: El Gringo
- Height: 5 ft 10 in (1.78 m)
- Weight: 155 lb (70 kg; 11 st 1 lb)
- Division: Lightweight
- Reach: 69.0 in (175 cm)
- Stance: Orthodox
- Fighting out of: Salta, Argentina
- Team: Kill Cliff FC
- Years active: 2015–present

Mixed martial arts record
- Total: 20
- Wins: 17
- By knockout: 9
- By submission: 5
- By decision: 3
- Losses: 3
- By submission: 1
- By decision: 2

Other information
- Mixed martial arts record from Sherdog

Esteban Ribovics Marijan (born 27 April 1996) is an Argentine mixed martial artist who currently competes in the lightweight division of the Ultimate Fighting Championship (UFC). As of October 3, 2026, he is #15 in the Meta UFC lightweight rankings.

== Background ==
Ribovics was born in Salta, Argentina. He first encountered mixed martial arts at the age of 12, when his friend introduced him to it, and he took a liking to it following his first class. After finishing high school, at 17, he moved to Córdoba and began perfecting his skills, training in multiple disciplines such as boxing, muay thai, and Brazilian jiu-jitsu. He made his professional debut at age 18 with Infernales de Tartagal, in Salta.

== Mixed martial arts career ==
=== Early career ===
Ribovics made his professional debut on 12 December 2015, and faced Lautaro Iturbe. He won the fight via Inverted Triangle Choke in the third round. He then went 7–0 in his next 7 fights, winning all by finish.

On 10 December 2020, he faced Javier Basurto for the Fusion FC Interim Lightweight Championship. He won the bought by first-round knockout. On 12 February 2022, he fought Franco Aranda for the Samurai Fight House Lightweight Championship. He won the bout once again by first-round knockout. He then earned a Dana White's Contender Series contract in August 2022 by stopping Thomas Paull in 90 seconds.

=== Ultimate Fighting Championship ===
Ribovics was scheduled to make his UFC promotional debut against Kamuela Kirk on 4 March 2023, at UFC 285. However, Kirk pulled out of the event for undisclosed reasons and was replaced by Loik Radzhabov. Ribovics lost the fight via unanimous decision.

Ribovics then had his match with promotional newcomer Kamuela Kirk rescheduled and they fought on 8 July 2023, at UFC 290. He won the fight by unanimous decision.

Ribovics was scheduled to face Elves Brener on 4 November 2023, at UFC Fight Night 231. However, Ribovics pulled out of the fight after suffering an accident that made him unable to fight.

Ribovics then faced Terrance McKinney on 11 May 2024, at UFC on ESPN 56. He won the fight via first-round knockout.

Ribovics faced Daniel Zellhuber on 14 September 2024, at UFC 306. He won the back and forth fight by split decision. This fight earned him his first Fight of the Night award.

Ribovics faced Nasrat Haqparast on 1 March 2025, at UFC Fight Night 253. Ribovics lost the fight via split decision. The bout earned him another Fight of the Night award. 9 out of 11 media outlets scored the bout for Ribovics.

Ribovics ended up facing Elves Brener on 2 August 2025, at UFC on ESPN 71. He won the fight via unanimous decision. This fight earned him another Fight of the Night award.

Ribovics faced Mateusz Gamrot on 11 April 2026, at UFC 327. He lost the fight via an arm-triangle choke submission in the second round.

Ribovics faced Edson Barboza on 15 August 2026, at UFC 330. He won the fight by technical knockout in the second round.

Ribovics faced King Green on 3 October 2026 at UFC 332. At the weigh-ins, Ribovics weighed in at 156.5 pounds, half a pound over the lightweight non-title fight limit. the bout proceeded at catchweight and he was fined 20 percent of his purse, which went to Green. He won the fight by technical knockout in the first round.

== Championships and accomplishments ==
- Ultimate Fighting Championship
  - Fight of the Night (Three times) vs. Daniel Zellhuber, Nasrat Haqparast and Elves Brener
  - UFC Honors Awards
    - 2024: President's Choice Fight of the Year Nominee vs. Daniel Zellhuber
  - UFC.com Awards
    - 2024: Fight of the Year vs. Daniel Zellhuber
- Samurai Fight House
  - SFH Lightweight Champion (one time)
- Fusion FC
  - FFC Interim Lightweight Champion (one time)
- LowKick MMA
  - 2024 Fight of the Year vs. Daniel Zellhuber at UFC 306
- Bleacher Report
  - 2024 Fight of the Year vs. Daniel Zellhuber
- Full Violence Awards
  - 2024 Fight of the Year vs. Daniel Zellhuber at UFC 306
- MMA Fighting
  - 2024 Round of the Year vs. Daniel Zellhuber
- MMA Junkie
  - 2024 Fight of the Year vs. Daniel Zellhuber
- CBS Sports
  - 2024 UFC Fight of the Year vs. Daniel Zellhuber
- Cageside Press
  - 2024 Fight of the Year vs. Daniel Zellhuber
- BodySlam.net
  - 2024 Fight of the Year vs. Daniel Zellhuber
- MMA Mania
  - 2024 #2 Ranked Fight of the Year vs. Daniel Zellhuber

== Mixed martial arts record ==
Professional record breakdown
20 matches	17 wins	3 losses
By knockout	9	0
By submission	5	1
By decision	3	2

Res.	Record	Opponent	Method	Event	Date	Round	Time	Location	Notes
Win	17–3	King Green	TKO (punches)	UFC 332	3 October 2026	1	4:08	Salt Lake City, Utah, United States	Catchweight (156.5 lb) bout; Ribovics missed weight.
Win	16–3	Edson Barboza	TKO (punches)	UFC 330	15 August 2026	2	1:32	Philadelphia, Pennsylvania, United States	
Loss	15–3	Mateusz Gamrot	Submission (arm triangle choke)	UFC 327	11 April 2026	2	4:19	Miami, Florida, United States	
Win	15–2	Elves Brener	Decision (unanimous)	UFC on ESPN: Taira vs. Park	2 August 2025	3	5:00	Las Vegas, Nevada, United States	Fight of the Night.
Loss	14–2	Nasrat Haqparast	Decision (split)	UFC Fight Night: Kape vs. Almabayev	1 March 2025	3	5:00	Las Vegas, Nevada, United States	Fight of the Night.
Win	14–1	Daniel Zellhuber	Decision (split)	UFC 306	14 September 2024	3	5:00	Las Vegas, Nevada, United States	Fight of the Night.
Win	13–1	Terrance McKinney	KO (head kick)	UFC on ESPN: Lewis vs. Nascimento	11 May 2024	1	0:37	St. Louis, Missouri, United States	
Win	12–1	Kamuela Kirk	Decision (unanimous)	UFC 290	8 July 2023	3	5:00	Las Vegas, Nevada, United States	
Loss	11–1	Loik Radzhabov	Decision (unanimous)	UFC 285	4 March 2023	3	5:00	Las Vegas, Nevada, United States	
Win	11–0	Thomas Paull	KO (punches)	Dana White's Contender Series 50	16 August 2022	1	1:30	Las Vegas, Nevada, United States	
Win	10–0	Franco Aranda	KO (punch)	Samurai Fight House 3	12 February 2022	1	0:27	Buenos Aires, Argentina	Won the inaugural SFH Lightweight Championship.
Win	9–0	Javier Basurto	KO (punches)	Fusion FC 44	10 December 2020	1	0:07	Lima, Peru	Won the interim FFC Lightweight Championship.
Win	8–0	Jose Zarauz	TKO (punches)	Fusion FC 43	4 March 2020	3	4:40	Lima, Peru	
Win	7–0	Brian Flamengo	KO (punches)	United Fighting Series 9	9 November 2019	1	0:22	Buenos Aires, Argentina	
Win	6–0	Lucas Aybar	Submission (kimura)	United Fighting Series 7	4 August 2019	1	4:24	Buenos Aires, Argentina	
Win	5–0	Juan Jose Ibanez	Submission (kimura)	Power Fight: La Batalla del Puente 1	13 May 2017	3	4:08	Corrientes, Argentina	
Win	4–0	Maximiliano Ortiz	Submission (kimura)	Hualsur FC: Noche de Campeones 18	15 October 2016	3	0:00	Córdoba, Argentina	
Win	3–0	Didier Nahuel	Submission (keylock)	Cage League Championship 1	9 July 2016	1	1:49	Buenos Aires, Argentina	
Win	2–0	Fernando Garcia	KO (superman punch)	Battle Cage 1	22 May 2016	2	2:30	Las Heras, Argentina	Catchweight (163 lb) bout.
Win	1–0	Lautaro Iturbe	Submission (inverted triangle choke)	Hualsur FC: Noche de Campeones 14	12 December 2015	3	2:35	Córdoba, Argentina	Lightweight debut.

== See also ==
- List of current UFC fighters
- List of Dana White's Contender Series alumni
- List of male mixed martial artists
