= UFC Fight Night: Burns vs. Brady =

Mixed martial arts event in 2024

- The poster for UFC Fight Night: Burns vs. Brady
- Promotion: Ultimate Fighting Championship
- Date: September 7, 2024
- Venue: UFC Apex
- City: Enterprise, Nevada, United States
- Attendance: Not announced

Event chronology
UFC on ESPN: Cannonier vs. Borralho	UFC Fight Night: Burns vs. Brady	UFC 306: O'Malley vs. Dvalishvili

UFC Fight Night: Burns vs. Brady (also known as UFC Fight Night 242, UFC on ESPN+ 100, and UFC Vegas 97) was a mixed martial arts event produced by the Ultimate Fighting Championship that took place on September 7, 2024, at the UFC Apex in Enterprise, Nevada, part of the Las Vegas Valley, United States.

== Background ==
A welterweight bout between former UFC Welterweight Championship challenger Gilbert Burns and Sean Brady served as the main event.

A featherweight bout between Calvin Kattar and Kyle Nelson was scheduled for this event. However, Kattar withdrew from the fight for unknown reasons and was replaced by Steve Garcia.

A bantamweight bout between Aiemann Zahabi and Marcus McGhee was reported for this event. However, the bout was removed from the card for unknown reasons.

A featherweight bout between Žygimantas Ramaška and Nathan Fletcher was scheduled to take place at UFC on ESPN: Cannonier vs. Borralho. Despite both men successfully weighing in, it was announced that the fight was canceled due to an undisclosed medical issue on Fletcher’s part and was re-scheduled to take place at this event.

A flyweight bout between Matt Schnell and Alessandro Costa was expected to take place at the event. However, Costa withdrew from the bout due to a shoulder injury and was replaced by Cody Durden in a bantamweight bout.

A light heavyweight bout between former interim UFC Light Heavyweight Championship challenger Ovince Saint Preux and former LFA Light Heavyweight Champion Ryan Spann was scheduled for this event. However, Saint Preux withdrew from the fight due to an illness and the bout was moved to UFC 307 as a result.

At the weigh-ins, Dylan Budka and Kyle Nelson missed weight. Budka weighed in at 188.5 pounds, two and a half pounds over the middleweight non-title fight limit. Nelson weighed in at 148.5 pounds, two and a half pounds over the featherweight non-title fight limit. Both bouts proceeded at catchweight with both fighters forfeiting 20% of their purses, which went to their opponents Andre Petroski and Steve Garcia, respectively.

== Results ==
Fight card (ESPN+)
Weight class				Method	Round	Time	Notes
Welterweight	Sean Brady	def.	Gilbert Burns	Decision (unanimous) (50–45, 50–45, 49–46)	5	5:00
Women's Flyweight	Natália Silva	def.	Jéssica Andrade	Decision (unanimous) (30–27, 30–27, 30–27)	3	5:00
Catchweight (148.5 lb)	Steve Garcia	def.	Kyle Nelson	TKO (elbows and punches)	1	3:59
Bantamweight	Cody Durden	def.	Matt Schnell	Submission (ninja choke)	2	0:29
Lightweight	Yanal Ashmouz	def.	Trevor Peek	Decision (unanimous) (30–27, 29–28, 29–28)	3	5:00
Preliminary card (ESPN+)
Lightweight	Chris Padilla	def.	Rong Zhu	TKO (doctor stoppage)	2	4:14
Featherweight	Isaac Dulgarian	def.	Brendon Marotte	Submission (arm-triangle choke)	2	4:19
Flyweight	André Lima	def.	Felipe dos Santos	Decision (unanimous) (30–27, 29–28, 29–28)	3	5:00
Featherweight	Gabriel Santos	def.	Yi Zha	Decision (unanimous) (30–26, 30–26, 30–27)	3	5:00
Women's Strawweight	Jaqueline Amorim	def.	Vanessa Demopoulos	Submission (armbar)	1	3:28
Catchweight (188.5 lb)	Andre Petroski	def.	Dylan Budka	Decision (unanimous) (30–27, 30–27, 30–27)	3	5:00
Featherweight	Nathan Fletcher	def.	Žygimantas Ramaška	Submission (arm-triangle choke)	2	1:14

== Bonus awards ==
The following fighters received $50,000 bonuses.

- Fight of the Night: Natália Silva vs. Jéssica Andrade
- Performance of the Night: Steve Garcia and Cody Durden

== See also ==
- 2024 in UFC
- List of current UFC fighters
- List of UFC events
