= Angela Hill =

American mixed martial artist (born 1985)

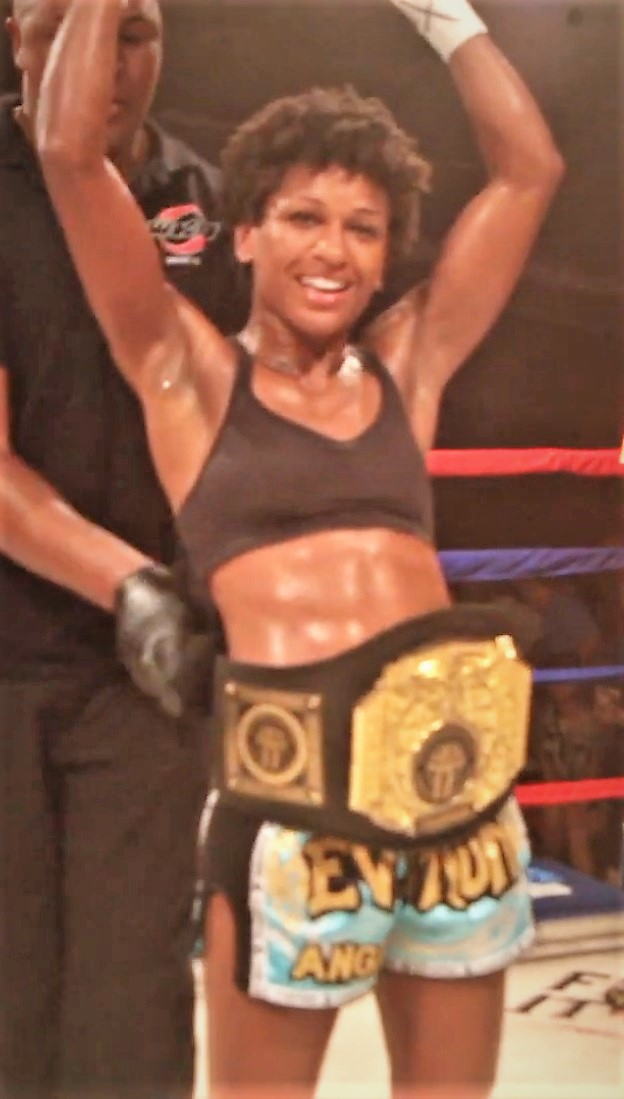
- Hill victorious over Sheila Adamos in 2012
- Born: Angela Patrice Hill; January 12, 1985 (age 41); Prince George's County, Maryland, U.S.
- Other names: Overkill
- Height: 5 ft 3 in (1.60 m)
- Weight: 115 lb (52 kg; 8.2 st)
- Division: Flyweight (2014); Strawweight (2014–present)
- Reach: 64 in (163 cm)
- Fighting out of: San Diego, California, U.S.
- Team: Alliance MMA
- Rank: Brown belt in Brazilian Jiu Jitsu
- Years active: 2014–present

Mixed martial arts record
- Total: 35
- Wins: 19
- By knockout: 5
- By submission: 1
- By decision: 13
- Losses: 16
- By submission: 2
- By decision: 14

Other information
- Mixed martial arts record from Sherdog

Angela Patrice Hill (born January 12, 1985) is an American mixed martial artist who competes in the women's Strawweight division of the Ultimate Fighting Championship (UFC). She was formerly signed with the Invicta Fighting Championships, where she was the strawweight champion. She is also a former World Kickboxing Association champion.

== Early life ==
Hill received a Bachelor of Fine Arts degree at the Cooper Union School of Art. Before becoming a professional fighter, she worked as an animator in animation studios and as a bartender.

Hill is also a video gamer and cosplayer, and several times appeared in costume before fights at Invicta. She has cosplayed as Dhalsim, Afro Samurai, a Fallout Vault Dweller, and as one of The Warriors, among others.

Hill's paternal grandparents were Barney and Betty Hill, who made one of the most notable alien abduction claims in the United States. Hill has said of this, "It was a really big deal that you could Wikipedia my grandfather."

== Mixed martial arts career ==
=== Early career ===
Hill began her professional MMA career in 2014 with a win over future Invicta fighter Stephanie Skinner.

=== The Ultimate Fighter ===
In June 2014, it was announced that Hill was one of the fighters selected by the UFC to appear on The Ultimate Fighter: A Champion Will Be Crowned. She faced Carla Esparza in the preliminary round and lost via submission in the first round.

=== Ultimate Fighting Championship ===
Hill's first fight after The Ultimate Fighter was against Emily Kagan at The Ultimate Fighter: A Champion Will Be Crowned Finale on December 12, 2014. Tecia Torres fought at UFC 188 and defeated Hill.

Hill faced Rose Namajunas at UFC 192 on October 3, 2015. She lost the fight by submission in the first round. She was subsequently released from the promotion.

=== Invicta FC ===
On November 17, 2015, Hill announced on her official Facebook page that she signed with Invicta FC. She made her debut for the promotion at Invicta FC 15 on January 16, 2016, and successfully notched a first round TKO victory over Alida Gray. Hill returned less than two months later on March 11, 2016, and knocked out former strawweight title challenger Stephanie Eggink in the second round, earning her first Performance of the Night bonus as a result of the finish.

Hill made another quick turnaround to face undefeated strawweight champion Lívia Renata Souza for the title at Invicta FC 17 on May 7, 2016. She won the fight via split decision to become the new Invicta FC Strawweight champion.

=== UFC return ===
Hill and Jéssica Andrade were briefly linked to a bout at UFC 207. However, the fight never materialized for that event because of a rule in the UFC's anti-doping policy with USADA. Subsequently, Andrade was removed from that card with the pairing left intact and rescheduled to take place at UFC Fight Night 104 on February 4, 2017. Andrade won the fight by unanimous decision. In addition, both participants were awarded Fight of the Night honors.

Hill faced Ashley Yoder on July 7, 2017, at The Ultimate Fighter 25 Finale. She won the fight by unanimous decision.

Hill faced Nina Ansaroff at UFC Fight Night 120 on November 11, 2017, in Norfolk, Virginia. She lost the fight via unanimous decision.

Hill faced Maryna Moroz at UFC on Fox 28 on February 24, 2018, at Amway Center in Orlando, Florida. She won the fight by unanimous decision.

Hill was scheduled to face Alexa Grasso on August 25, 2018, at UFC Fight Night 135. However, Grasso was pulled out from the bout on July 19, 2018, due to knee injury and she was replaced by Cortney Casey. She lost the fight via split decision. 11 out of 17 media outlets scored the bout for Hill.

Hill faced Randa Markos on March 23, 2019, at UFC Fight Night 148. She lost the fight via a submission in round one.

Hill replaced an injured Jessica Penne against Jodie Esquibel on April 27, 2019, at UFC Fight Night 150. She won the fight by unanimous decision.

Hill faced Yan Xiaonan, replacing injured Felice Herrig, on June 8, 2019, at UFC 238. She lost the fight by unanimous decision.

Hill was scheduled to face Istela Nunes on September 21, 2019, at UFC Fight Night 159. However, on August 12, 2019, it was reported that Nunes was removed from the card due to a failed drug test, and she was replaced by Ariane Carnelossi. Hill won the fight via TKO due to a doctor's stoppage in the third round after an elbow she threw cut Carnelossi over the left eye and rendered her unable to continue.

Hill faced Hannah Cifers, replacing Brianna Van Buren on January 25, 2020, at UFC Fight Night 166. She won the fight via technical knockout in round two.

Hill accepted a short notice fight once again, replacing Hannah Goldy to fight Loma Lookboonmee at UFC Fight Night 168 on February 23, 2020. She won the fight via unanimous decision.

Hill faced Cláudia Gadelha on May 16, 2020, at UFC on ESPN 8. She lost the bout via split decision. 13 of 17 media outlets scored the fight in favor of Hill.

Hill was scheduled to meet Michelle Waterson on August 22, 2020, at UFC on ESPN 15. However, due to some personal reasons on Waterson's side, the bout was moved three weeks later to the 5 rounds main event at UFC Fight Night 177. Hill lost the fight via split decision. This fight earned her the Fight of the Night award. 11 out of 21 media outlets scored the bout for Hill.

A rematch with Tecia Torres was expected to take place on December 12, 2020, at UFC 256. However, Hill was forced to pull out from the event due to testing positive for COVID-19.

Hill was scheduled to face Ashley Yoder in a rematch of their 2017 bout on February 27, 2021, at UFC Fight Night 186. However, day of the event it was announced that the bout was scrapped from the card after one of Yoder's cornermen tested positive COVID-19. The bout was rescheduled and took place at UFC Fight Night 187 on March 13. Hill won the fight via unanimous decision.

Hill was scheduled to meet Amanda Ribas on May 8, 2021, at UFC on ESPN 24. However, the day of the event Ribas was removed from the bout due to COVID-19 protocols and the bout was cancelled. The bout was rescheduled for UFC Fight Night 189 on June 5, 2021. Two weeks later, the pairing was scrapped once again as Ribas was still suffering from lingering COVID-19 symptoms.

The rematch with Tecia Torres was rescheduled and took place on August 7, 2021, at UFC 265. Hill lost the fight via unanimous decision.

Hill faced Amanda Lemos, replacing Nina Nunes, on December 18, 2021, at UFC Fight Night 199. Hill lost the bout via split decision. 10 out of 11 media scores gave it to Hill. This bout earned the Fight of the Night bonus award.

Hill faced Virna Jandiroba on May 14, 2022, at UFC on ESPN 36. She lost the bout via unanimous decision.

Hill faced Lupita Godinez on August 13, 2022, at UFC on ESPN 41. She won the fight via unanimous decision.

Hill faced Emily Ducote on December 3, 2022, at UFC on ESPN 42. She won the bout via unanimous decision.

Hill was scheduled to face Mackenzie Dern on May 13, 2023, at UFC on ABC 4. However, the bout was instead postponed one week to headline UFC Fight Night 223. She lost the fight via unanimous decision. This fight earned her the Fight of the Night award.

Hill faced Denise Gomes at UFC Fight Night 231 on November 4, 2023. She won the fight via unanimous decision.

Hill faced Luana Pinheiro on May 18, 2024, at UFC Fight Night 241. She won the bout by a guillotine choke submission in the second round. This fight earned her her first Performance of the Night award.

Hill faced Tabatha Ricci on August 24, 2024 at UFC on ESPN 62. She lost the fight by unanimous decision.

Hill faced Ketlen Souza on February 15, 2025 at UFC Fight Night 251. She won the fight by split decision. 8 out of 10 media outlets scored the bout for Souza.

Hill faced Iasmin Lucindo on August 9, 2025 at UFC on ESPN 72. She lost the fight by unanimous decision.

Hill faced Fatima Kline on November 15, 2025 at UFC 322. She lost the fight by unanimous decision.

Hill faced promotional newcomer Xiong Jingnan on May 30, 2026 at UFC Fight Night 277. She won the fight via unanimous decision.

Hill is scheduled to face Shanelle Dyer on December 12, 2026 at UFC 335.

== Championships and accomplishments ==
=== Mixed Martial Arts ===
- Ultimate Fighting Championship
  - Fight of the Night (Four times) vs. Jéssica Andrade, Michelle Waterson, Amanda Lemos and Mackenzie Dern
    - Second most Fight of the Night bonuses in UFC Women's history (4) (behind Jéssica Andrade)
  - Performance of the Night (One time) vs. Luana Pinheiro
    - Tied (Zhang Weili) for fourth most Post-Fight bonuses in UFC Women's Strawweight division history (5)
  - Most bouts in UFC Women's Strawweight division history (29)
    - Tied (Jéssica Andrade) for most bouts in UFC Women's history (30)
  - Most wins in UFC Women's Strawweight division history (13)
  - Most losses in UFC Women's history (16)
  - Most total fight time in UFC Women's Strawweight division history (6:57:45)
    - Most total fight time in UFC Women's history (7:12:45)
    - Sixth longest fight time in UFC history (7:12:45)
  - Most significant strikes landed in UFC Women's Strawweight division history (2279)
    - Most significant strikes landed in UFC Women's history (2364)
    - Third most significant strikes landed in UFC history (2364)
  - Most total strikes landed in UFC Women's Strawweight division history (2675)
    - Fourth most total strikes landed in UFC history (2763)
  - Most unanimous decision wins in UFC Women's Strawweight division history (9)
    - Most decision wins in UFC Women's Strawweight division history (10)
  - Most decision bouts in UFC Women's Strawweight division history (24)
    - Most decision bouts in UFC history (25)
  - Fourth most control time in UFC Women's Strawweight division history (1:01:33)
  - Tied (Jorge Masvidal, Clay Guida, Paul Felder, Cortney Casey & Andrea Lee) for most split decision losses in UFC history (4)
  - UFC.com Awards
    - 2017: Ranked #8 Fight of the Year vs. Jéssica Andrade
- Invicta Fighting Championships
  - Won the Invicta FC Strawweight Championship (One time)
    - One successful title defense
  - Performance of the Night (Three times) vs. Alida Gray, Stephanie Eggink and Lívia Renata Souza
- MMA Junkie
  - 2020 September Fight of the Month vs. Michelle Waterson
- MMA Fighting
  - 2022 Third Team MMA All-Star

== Mixed martial arts record ==
Professional record breakdown
| 35 matches | 19 wins | 16 losses |
| By knockout | 5 | 0 |
| By submission | 1 | 2 |
| By decision | 13 | 14 |

| Res. | Record | Opponent | Method | Event | Date | Round | Time | Location | Notes |
|---|---|---|---|---|---|---|---|---|---|
| Win | 19–16 | Xiong Jingnan | Decision (unanimous) | UFC Fight Night: Song vs. Figueiredo | May 30, 2026 | 3 | 5:00 | Macau SAR, China | |
| Loss | 18–16 | Fatima Kline | Decision (unanimous) | UFC 322 | November 15, 2025 | 3 | 5:00 | New York City, New York, United States | |
| Loss | 18–15 | Iasmin Lucindo | Decision (unanimous) | UFC on ESPN: Dolidze vs. Hernandez | August 9, 2025 | 3 | 5:00 | Las Vegas, Nevada, United States | |
| Win | 18–14 | Ketlen Souza | Decision (split) | UFC Fight Night: Cannonier vs. Rodrigues | February 15, 2025 | 3 | 5:00 | Las Vegas, Nevada, United States | |
| Loss | 17–14 | Tabatha Ricci | Decision (unanimous) | UFC on ESPN: Cannonier vs. Borralho | August 24, 2024 | 3 | 5:00 | Las Vegas, Nevada, United States | |
| Win | 17–13 | Luana Pinheiro | Submission (guillotine choke) | UFC Fight Night: Barboza vs. Murphy | May 18, 2024 | 2 | 4:12 | Las Vegas, Nevada, United States | Performance of the Night. |
| Win | 16–13 | Denise Gomes | Decision (unanimous) | UFC Fight Night: Almeida vs. Lewis | November 4, 2023 | 3 | 5:00 | São Paulo, Brazil | |
| Loss | 15–13 | Mackenzie Dern | Decision (unanimous) | UFC Fight Night: Dern vs. Hill | May 20, 2023 | 5 | 5:00 | Las Vegas, Nevada, United States | Fight of the Night. |
| Win | 15–12 | Emily Ducote | Decision (unanimous) | UFC on ESPN: Thompson vs. Holland | December 3, 2022 | 3 | 5:00 | Orlando, Florida, United States | |
| Win | 14–12 | Lupita Godinez | Decision (unanimous) | UFC on ESPN: Vera vs. Cruz | August 13, 2022 | 3 | 5:00 | San Diego, California, United States | Catchweight (120 lb) bout. |
| Loss | 13–12 | Virna Jandiroba | Decision (unanimous) | UFC on ESPN: Błachowicz vs. Rakić | May 14, 2022 | 3 | 5:00 | Las Vegas, Nevada, United States | |
| Loss | 13–11 | Amanda Lemos | Decision (split) | UFC Fight Night: Lewis vs. Daukaus | December 18, 2021 | 3 | 5:00 | Las Vegas, Nevada, United States | Fight of the Night. |
| Loss | 13–10 | Tecia Torres | Decision (unanimous) | UFC 265 | August 7, 2021 | 3 | 5:00 | Houston, Texas, United States | |
| Win | 13–9 | Ashley Yoder | Decision (unanimous) | UFC Fight Night: Edwards vs. Muhammad | March 13, 2021 | 3 | 5:00 | Las Vegas, Nevada, United States | |
| Loss | 12–9 | Michelle Waterson | Decision (split) | UFC Fight Night: Waterson vs. Hill | September 12, 2020 | 5 | 5:00 | Las Vegas, Nevada, United States | Fight of the Night. |
| Loss | 12–8 | Cláudia Gadelha | Decision (split) | UFC on ESPN: Overeem vs. Harris | May 16, 2020 | 3 | 5:00 | Jacksonville, Florida, United States | |
| Win | 12–7 | Loma Lookboonmee | Decision (unanimous) | UFC Fight Night: Felder vs. Hooker | February 23, 2020 | 3 | 5:00 | Auckland, New Zealand | |
| Win | 11–7 | Hannah Cifers | TKO (elbows and punches) | UFC Fight Night: Blaydes vs. dos Santos | January 25, 2020 | 2 | 4:26 | Raleigh, North Carolina, United States | |
| Win | 10–7 | Ariane Carnelossi | TKO (doctor stoppage) | UFC Fight Night: Rodríguez vs. Stephens | September 21, 2019 | 3 | 1:56 | Mexico City, Mexico | |
| Loss | 9–7 | Yan Xiaonan | Decision (unanimous) | UFC 238 | June 8, 2019 | 3 | 5:00 | Chicago, Illinois, United States | |
| Win | 9–6 | Jodie Esquibel | Decision (unanimous) | UFC Fight Night: Jacaré vs. Hermansson | April 27, 2019 | 3 | 5:00 | Sunrise, Florida, United States | |
| Loss | 8–6 | Randa Markos | Submission (armbar) | UFC Fight Night: Thompson vs. Pettis | March 23, 2019 | 1 | 4:24 | Nashville, Tennessee, United States | |
| Loss | 8–5 | Cortney Casey | Decision (split) | UFC Fight Night: Gaethje vs. Vick | August 25, 2018 | 3 | 5:00 | Lincoln, Nebraska, United States | |
| Win | 8–4 | Maryna Moroz | Decision (unanimous) | UFC on Fox: Emmett vs. Stephens | February 24, 2018 | 3 | 5:00 | Orlando, Florida, United States | |
| Loss | 7–4 | Nina Ansaroff | Decision (unanimous) | UFC Fight Night: Poirier vs. Pettis | November 11, 2017 | 3 | 5:00 | Norfolk, Virginia, United States | |
| Win | 7–3 | Ashley Yoder | Decision (unanimous) | The Ultimate Fighter: Redemption Finale | July 7, 2017 | 3 | 5:00 | Las Vegas, Nevada, United States | |
| Loss | 6–3 | Jéssica Andrade | Decision (unanimous) | UFC Fight Night: Bermudez vs. The Korean Zombie | February 4, 2017 | 3 | 5:00 | Houston, Texas, United States | Fight of the Night. |
| Win | 6–2 | Kaline Medeiros | Decision (unanimous) | Invicta FC 20 | November 18, 2016 | 5 | 5:00 | Kansas City, Missouri, United States | Defended the Invicta FC Strawweight Championship. |
| Win | 5–2 | Lívia Renata Souza | Decision (split) | Invicta FC 17 | May 7, 2016 | 5 | 5:00 | Costa Mesa, California, United States | Won the Invicta FC Strawweight Championship. Performance of the Night. |
| Win | 4–2 | Stephanie Eggink | KO (punch) | Invicta FC 16 | March 11, 2016 | 2 | 2:36 | Las Vegas, Nevada, United States | Performance of the Night. |
| Win | 3–2 | Alida Gray | TKO (knee to the body) | Invicta FC 15 | January 16, 2016 | 1 | 1:39 | Costa Mesa, California, United States | Performance of the Night. |
| Loss | 2–2 | Rose Namajunas | Submission (rear-naked choke) | UFC 192 | October 3, 2015 | 1 | 2:47 | Houston, Texas, United States | |
| Loss | 2–1 | Tecia Torres | Decision (unanimous) | UFC 188 | June 12, 2015 | 3 | 5:00 | Mexico City, Mexico | |
| Win | 2–0 | Emily Kagan | Decision (unanimous) | The Ultimate Fighter: A Champion Will Be Crowned Finale | December 12, 2014 | 3 | 5:00 | Las Vegas, Nevada, United States | Strawweight debut. |
| Win | 1–0 | Stephanie Skinner | TKO (knees) | US Freedom FC 18 | April 26, 2014 | 2 | 1:35 | Winston-Salem, North Carolina, United States | Flyweight debut. |

=== Mixed martial arts exhibition record ===
| Exhibition record breakdown | | |
| 1 match | 0 wins | 1 loss |
| By submission | 0 | 1 |

| Res. | Record | Opponent | Method | Event | Date | Round | Time | Location | Notes |
|---|---|---|---|---|---|---|---|---|---|
| Loss | 0–1 | Carla Esparza | Submission (standing rear-naked choke) | The Ultimate Fighter: A Champion Will Be Crowned | October 1, 2014 (airdate) | 1 | 3:42 | Las Vegas, Nevada, United States | TUF 20 Elimination round. |

== Muay Thai record ==
Professional Muay Thai Record
2 Wins, 0 Losses'
| Date | Result | Opponent | Event | Location | Method | Round | Time | Record |
| February 28, 2014 | Win | (United States) Ashley Nichols | Friday Night Fights | Broad Street Ballroom, New York, New York, United States | Decision (Split) | 3 | 3:00 | 2-0 |
Won the WIKBA & IMTF World titles.
| September 20, 2013 | Win | (United States) Monique Travis | Lion Fight 11 | Fremont Street Experience, Las Vegas, Nevada, United States | KO | 3 | 1:33 | 1-0 |

Amateur Muay Thai record
14 Wins, 0 Losses
| Date | Result | Opponent | Event | Location | Method | Round | Time | Record |
| July 27, 2013 | Win | (United States) Miranda Cayabyab | Lion Fight 10 | Hard Rock Hotel & Casino, Las Vegas, Nevada, United States | KO | 1 | N/A | 14-0 |
| February 22, 2013 | Win | (United States) Ariana Gomez | Take-On Muay Thai 19 | Resorts World Casino, Queens, New York City, United States | Decision (Unanimous) | 3 | 3:00 | 13-0 |
| July 20, 2012 | Win | (United States) Jill Guido | Friday Night Fights | New York City, New York, United States | Decision (Majority) | 3 | 3:00 | 12-0 |
| June 22, 2012 | Win | (United States) Sheila Adamos | Friday Night Fights | New York City, New York, United States | Decision (Unanimous) | 3 | 3:00 | 11-0 |
| WKA Amateur North American Muay Thai Bantamweight title defense | | | | | | | | |
| June 1, 2012 | Win | (United States) Amanda Williams | Friday Night Fights | New York City, New York, United States | Decision (Unanimous) | 3 | 3:00 | 10-0 |
| May 22, 2012 | Win | (United States) Maria Gomez | Friday Night Fights | New York City, New York, United States | Decision (Unanimous) | 3 | 3:00 | 9-0 |
| May 12, 2012 | Win | (United States) Paige Novak | Friday Night Fights | New York City, New York, United States | Decision (Unanimous) | 3 | 3:00 | 8-0 |
| Wins WKA Amateur North American Muay Thai Bantamweight title | | | | | | | | |
| April 1, 2012 | Win | (United States) Ashly Jones | Friday Night Fights | New York City, New York, United States | KO | 1 | 2:30 | 7-0 |
| March 28, 2012 | Win | (United Kingdom) Talia Bates | Friday Night Fights | New York City, New York, United States | Decision (Unanimous) | 3 | 3:00 | 6-0 |
| February 21, 2012 | Win | (United States) Felicia Torres | Friday Night Fights | New York City, New York, United States | Decision (Unanimous) | 3 | 3:00 | 5-0 |
| January 8, 2012 | Win | (United States) Ashly Jones | Friday Night Fights | New York City, New York, United States | Decision (Unanimous) | 3 | 3:00 | 4-0 |
| 2011 | Win | (United States) Page Williams | Friday Night Fights | New York City, New York, United States | Decision (Unanimous) | 3 | 3:00 | 3-0 |
| 2011 | Win | (United States) Sasha Eades | Friday Night Fights | New York City, New York, United States | Decision (Unanimous) | 3 | 3:00 | 2-0 |
| 2011 | Win | (United States) Ashly Jones | Friday Night Fights | New York City, New York, United States | Decision (Unanimous) | 3 | 3:00 | 1-0 |
Legend: Win Loss Draw/No contest Notes

Awards and achievements
| Preceded by Lívia Renata Souza | 4th Invicta FC Strawweight Champion; May 7, 2016 – February 4, 2017 | Succeeded by Virna Jandiroba |
