= UFC 282 =

Mixed martial arts event in 2022

UFC 282: Błachowicz vs. Ankalaev
- The poster for UFC 282: Błachowicz vs. Ankalaev
- Promotion: Ultimate Fighting Championship
- Date: December 10, 2022
- Venue: T-Mobile Arena
- City: Paradise, Nevada, United States
- Attendance: 18,455
- Total gate: $4,409,511

Event chronology
UFC on ESPN: Thompson vs. Holland	UFC 282: Błachowicz vs. Ankalaev	UFC Fight Night: Cannonier vs. Strickland

UFC 282: Błachowicz vs. Ankalaev was a mixed martial arts event produced by the Ultimate Fighting Championship. It took place on December 10, 2022, at the T-Mobile Arena in Paradise, Nevada, part of the Las Vegas Metropolitan Area, United States.

== Background ==
A UFC Light Heavyweight Championship rematch between then current champion Jiří Procházka (also former Rizin Light Heavyweight Champion) and former champion Glover Teixeira was originally expected to headline the event. The pair previously met at UFC 275 in June, with Procházka winning the back and forth fight (and championship) by submission in the fifth round. However, on November 23, Procházka pulled out due to a shoulder injury that would require surgery and at least six months of rehabilitation. He decided to vacate the title, and Teixeira subsequently refused a replacement fight against Magomed Ankalaev. Therefore, the co-main event bout between former champion Jan Błachowicz (also former KSW Light Heavyweight Champion) and Ankalaev was promoted to the main event status and arranged for the vacant championship.

A heavyweight bout between Jairzinho Rozenstruik and Chris Daukaus was originally scheduled for UFC Fight Night: Dern vs. Yan, but it was moved to this event for undisclosed reasons.

Promotional newcomer Bo Nickal was expected to face Jamie Pickett in a middleweight bout. However, it was announced in late October that Nickal withdrew due to injury and the bout was scrapped.

A light heavyweight bout between former title challenger Alexander Gustafsson and former interim title contender Ovince Saint Preux was expected to take place at the event. However, Gustafsson withdrew due to an undisclosed reason and was replaced by 2018 PFL heavyweight tournament winner Philipe Lins. In turn, Lins withdrew from the bout due to an undisclosed reason and was replaced by Antonio Trocoli. However, Trocoli withdrew due to visa issues. As a result, Saint Preux was pulled from the card as well due to the promotion being unable to find another replacement.

A bantamweight bout between Cameron Saaiman and Ronnie Lawrence was expected to take place at the event. However, Lawrence withdrew for unknown reasons the week before the event and was replaced by promotional newcomer Steven Koslow.

A welterweight bout between former UFC Welterweight Champion Robbie Lawler and Santiago Ponzinibbio was expected to take place at the event. The pairing was previously scheduled to meet at UFC 245 in 2019 but Ponzinibbio withdrew due to a staph infection. However, the week of the event, the bout fell through again as Lawler was forced to withdraw due to an undisclosed injury. He was replaced by Alex Morono at a catchweight of 180 pounds.

A flyweight bout between Daniel da Silva and Vinicius Salvador was expected to take place at the event. However, after the official weigh-ins, in which da Silva weighed in at 129 pounds, three pounds over the flyweight non-title fight limit, it was announced he had been pulled from the card due to an undisclosed medical issue and the bout was scrapped.

== Results ==
Main card
Weight class				Method	Round	Time	Notes
Light Heavyweight	Jan Błachowicz	vs.	Magomed Ankalaev	Draw (split) (48–47, 46–48, 47–47)	5	5:00	(Note: For the vacant UFC Light Heavyweight Championship.)
Lightweight	Paddy Pimblett	def.	Jared Gordon	Decision (unanimous) (29–28, 29–28, 29–28)	3	5:00
Catchweight (180 lb)	Santiago Ponzinibbio	def.	Alex Morono	KO (punches)	3	2:29
Middleweight	Dricus du Plessis	def.	Darren Till	Submission (face crank)	3	2:43
Featherweight	Ilia Topuria	def.	Bryce Mitchell	Submission (arm-triangle choke)	2	3:10
Preliminary card (ESPN2 / ESPN+)
Bantamweight	Raul Rosas Jr.	def.	Jay Perrin	Submission (face crank)	1	2:44	(Note: Rosas Jr. sets the record as the youngest UFC fighter to win a fight.)
Heavyweight	Jairzinho Rozenstruik	def.	Chris Daukaus	KO (punch)	1	0:23
Middleweight	Edmen Shahbazyan	def.	Dalcha Lungiambula	TKO (punches)	2	4:41
Middleweight	Chris Curtis	def.	Joaquin Buckley	KO (punches)	2	2:49
Early preliminary card (ESPN+ / UFC Fight Pass)
Featherweight	Billy Quarantillo	def.	Alexander Hernandez	TKO (knees and punches)	2	4:30
Featherweight	T.J. Brown	def.	Erik Silva	Submission (arm-triangle choke)	3	3:41
Bantamweight	Cameron Saaiman	def.	Steven Koslow	TKO (knees and punches)	3	4:13	(Note: Saaiman was deducted 1 point in round 2 due to an illegal knee.)

== Bonus awards ==
The following fighters received $50,000 bonuses.

- Fight of the Night: Dricus du Plessis vs. Darren Till
- Performance of the Night: Santiago Ponzinibbio, Ilia Topuria, Raúl Rosas Jr., Jairzinho Rozenstruik, Edmen Shahbazyan, Chris Curtis, Billy Quarantillo, T.J. Brown, and Cameron Saaiman

With eleven post-fight bonuses, this was the record for most bonuses given in a single UFC event.

== See also ==
- List of UFC events
- List of current UFC fighters
- 2022 in UFC
