= 2026 in Legacy Fighting Alliance =

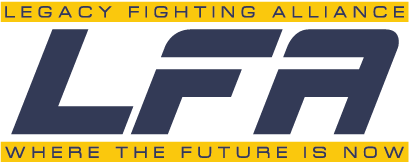

Information
- First date: January 16, 2026

Events

Fights

Chronology
2025 in LFA	2026 in Legacy Fighting Alliance	2027 in LFA

The year 2026 is the tenth year in the history of Legacy Fighting Alliance (LFA) a mixed martial arts promotion based in the United States.

== Background ==
On January 7, 2026, it was announced that the promotion has officially parted ways with UFC Fight Pass and signed a new broadcast deal with Vice TV, which will air 25 events in 2026. This marking a significant shift for the regional promotion as the UFC also cut ties with several other regional partners.

On October 20, 2026, it was announced a multi-year partnership deal with FloSports for North American streaming, which will begin LFA 244 to events in December 2026, followed the 25 events in 2027.

== List of events ==
#	Event	Date	Venue	Location
1	LFA 224: Adams vs. Bilalov	Jan 16, 2026	Mystic Lake Casino Hotel	Prior Lake, Minnesota, U.S.
2	LFA 225: Degli vs. Aguiar	Jan 23, 2026	Nilson Nelson Gymnasium	Brasília, Brazil
3	LFA 226: Allakhverdiev vs. Kropschot	Feb 6, 2026	F&M Bank Arena	Clarksville, Tennessee, U.S.
4	LFA 227: Nascimento vs. Kamikubo	Feb 27, 2026	Ventura County Fairgrounds	Ventura, California, U.S.
5	LFA 228: Natividad vs. Garcia	Mar 13, 2026	Gila River Resorts and Casinos – Wild Horse Pass	Chandler, Arizona, U.S.
6	LFA 229: Martins vs. Gonçalves	Mar 27, 2026	Centro Esportivo Pelezão	São Paulo, Brazil
7	LFA 230: Bartling vs. Cleveland	Apr 3, 2026	Grand Casino Hotel & Resort	Shawnee, Oklahoma, U.S.
8	LFA 231: Lozej vs. Ibarra	Apr 17, 2026	Mystic Lake Casino Hotel	Prior Lake, Minnesota, U.S.
9	LFA 232: Visconde vs. Pintos	May 15, 2026	Foxwoods Resort Casino	Mashantucket, Connecticut, U.S.
10	LFA 233: Piersma vs. Bianchini	May 22, 2026	Seneca Allegany Casino	Salamanca, New York, U.S.
11	LFA 234: Fernando vs. Soares	May 29, 2026	Ginásio do Povilho	Cajamar, Brazil
11	LFA 235: Stewart vs. Havener	Jun 19, 2026	Freedom Hall	Louisville, Kentucky, U.S.
12	LFA 236: Ikei vs. Parra	Jun 26, 2026	Arizona Financial Theatre	Phoenix, Arizona, U.S.
13	LFA 237: Lee vs. Tardio	Jul 24, 2026	La Crosse Center	La Crosse, Wisconsin, U.S.
14	LFA 238: Distrito #1	Jul 31, 2026	Nilson Nelson Gymnasium	Brasília, Brazil
15	LFA 239: Mecate vs. Exposito	Aug 21, 2026	Ventura County Fairgrounds	Ventura, California, U.S.
16	LFA 240: Sanders vs. Gomez	Aug 28, 2026	F&M Bank Arena	Clarksville, Tennessee, U.S.
17	LFA 241: Pires vs. Pereira	Sep 11, 2026	Mineirinho Arena	Belo Horizonte, Brazil
18	LFA 242: Lozej vs. Bittencourt	Sep 18, 2026	Mystic Lake Casino Hotel	Prior Lake, Minnesota, U.S.
19	LFA 243: Maximov vs. Santos	Oct 9, 2026	Kaiser Permanente Arena	Santa Cruz, California, U.S.
20	LFA 244: Woodley vs. Havener	Oct 23, 2026	Foxwoods Resort Casino	Mashantucket, Connecticut, U.S.
21	LFA 245: Khamzaev vs. Prescendo	Oct 30, 2026	Seneca Niagara Casino & Hotel	Niagara Falls, New York, U.S.
22	LFA 246: Alves vs. Vinuto	Nov 13, 2026	Ginasio do Polvilho	Cajamar, Brazil
23	LFA 247: Breno vs. Torres	Nov 20, 2026	Arizona Financial Theatre	Phoenix, Arizona, U.S.
24	LFA 248: Costa vs. Hartshorn	Dec 18, 2026	Pearl Theater at Palms Casino Resort	Las Vegas, Nevada, U.S.

== LFA 224: Adams vs. Bilalov ==
LFA 224: Adams vs. Bilalov
- Promotion: Legacy Fighting Alliance
- Date: January 16, 2026
- Venue: Mystic Lake Casino Hotel
- City: Prior Lake, Minnesota, United States

LFA 224: Adams vs. Bilalov was a mixed martial arts event promoted by Legacy Fighting Alliance that took place on January 16, 2026, in Prior Lake, Minnesota, United States.

=== Background ===
A LFA Heavyweight Championship bout for the vacant title between Matt Adams and Arslan Bilalov headlined the event.

=== Results ===
Main card (Vice TV)
Weight class				Method	Round	Time	Notes
Heavyweight	Arslan Bilalov	def.	Matt Adams	Submission (rear-naked choke)	1	4:47	(Note: For the vacant LFA Heavyweight Championship.)
Welterweight	Josiah Harrell	def.	Bekmyrza Dosmatov	TKO (corner stoppage)	3	3:28
Women's Strawweight	Giovanna Canuto	def.	Janaína Silva	Submission (face crank)	3	2:38
Featherweight	Taner Trembley	def.	Shaheen Santana	Submission (guillotine choke)	1	3:32
Lightweight	Canon Swanson	def.	Jimmy Washington	Technical Submission (arm-triangle choke)	1	2:59
Featherweight	Abbas Abasov	def.	Jose Intriago	TKO (head kick and punches)	2	3:39
Preliminary card (LFA Fight Network)
Middleweight	Tyree Overton	def.	Pedro Trujillo	Decision (unanimous) (29–28, 29–28, 29–28)	3	5:00
Heavyweight	Ezayah Gomez Oropeza	def.	Braden Peterson	Submission (kimura)	1	1:02
Catchweight (150 lb)	Noah Gasho	def.	David McKinney	TKO (punches)	2	2:27
Lightweight	Mitchell Wilson	def.	Sedric Richard	Submission (arm-triangle choke)	1	1:20
Lightweight	McCoy Tekautz	def.	Hykeem Green	KO (punches)	1	0:21
Amateur bouts
Lightweight	Xavier Judge	def.	Alex Martin	Decision (unanimous) (30–26, 30–26, 30–26)	3	3:00
Middleweight	Cadin Vowels	def.	Armani Webster	Decision (unanimous) (29–28, 30–27, 30–26)	3	3:00
Women's Featherweight	Daysi Perez	def.	Jessie Hays	Submission (rear-naked choke)	3	1:26

== LFA 225: Degli vs. Aguiar ==
LFA 225: Degli vs. Aguiar
- Promotion: Legacy Fighting Alliance
- Date: January 23, 2026
- Venue: Nilson Nelson Gymnasium
- City: Brasília, Brazil

LFA 225: Degli vs. Aguiar was a mixed martial arts event promoted by Legacy Fighting Alliance that took place on January 23, 2026, in Brasília, Brazil.

=== Background ===
An interim LFA Flyweight Championship bout between interim champion Marcos Degli and Luís Aguiar headlined the event. At the weigh-ins, Aguiar weighed in at 125.8 pounds, 0.8 pounds over the title fight limit. His bout proceeded as a one-sided title bout, scheduled for five rounds, with only reigning interim champion Degli was eligible crowned the interim title.

=== Results ===
Main card (Vice TV)
Weight class				Method	Round	Time	Notes
Flyweight	Marcos Degli (ic)	def.	Luís Aguiar	KO (punch to the body)	1	1:35	(Note: For the interim LFA Flyweight Championship.)
Bantamweight	Derick Garcia Borges	def.	Daniel Araújo	Decision (unanimous) (30–25, 29–26, 29–26)	3	5:00
Bantamweight	Rafael Pereira	def.	Lionel Abojer	Technical Submission (rear-naked choke)	3	3:28
Middleweight	Julio Cesar Spadaccini	def.	Marcio Cabral	TKO (punches)	1	2:34
Light Heavyweight	Leon Soares	def.	Miguel Porto	Submission (rear-naked choke)	1	4:59
Featherweight	Aristides Vinícius	def.	Icaro Brito	Decision (unanimous) (30–27, 29–28, 29–28)	3	5:00
Welterweight	Gabriel Vinicius	def.	Joel Salviano	Decision (unanimous) (30–25, 30–26, 30–26)	3	5:00
Preliminary card (LFA Fight Network)
Middleweight	Gustavo Rocha	def.	Vladimir Calvo Marrero	Decision (unanimous) (30–27, 29–28, 29–28)	3	5:00
Women's Flyweight	Bianca Basílio	def.	Jéssica Oliveira	Submission (armbar)	1	4:58	(Note: Oliveira missed weight (128.6 lb).)
Catchweight (130 lb)	Frank da Silva Castro	def.	João Menezes	Decision (unanimous) (30–27, 30–27, 30–27)	3	5:00	(Note: Menezes missed weight (134 lb).)
Featherweight	Leonardo Cerboni	def.	Lucas Silva Cruz	Submission (rear-naked choke)	1	4:13	(Note: Cerboni missed weight (147.8 lb).)
Bantamweight	Breno Yuri Santos	def.	Lucas Sousa Andrade	Submission (triangle choke)	2	1:21
Catchweight (159 lb)	Italo Cruz	def.	Vinicius Silva	TKO (elbows)	2	1:58	(Note: Silva missed weight (166 lb).)
Lightweight	Pedro Victor de Souza	def.	Lucas Almeida Barreto	Decision (unanimous) (29–28, 29–28, 30–27)	3	5:00

== LFA 226: Allakhverdiev vs. Kropschot ==
LFA 226: Allakhverdiev vs. Kropschot
- Promotion: Legacy Fighting Alliance
- Date: February 6, 2026
- Venue: F&M Bank Arena
- City: Clarksville, Tennessee, United States

LFA 226: Allakhverdiev vs. Kropschot was a mixed martial arts event promoted by Legacy Fighting Alliance that took place on February 6, 2026, in Clarksville, Tennessee, United States.

=== Background ===
The event marked the promotion's second visit to Clarksville and first since LFA 219 in October 2025.

A LFA Middleweight Championship bout between current champion David Allakhverdiev and Joseph Kropschot headlined the event.

=== Results ===
Main card (Vice TV)
Weight class				Method	Round	Time	Notes
Middleweight	Joseph Kropschot	def.	David Allakhverdiev (c)	Submission (rear-naked choke)	2	3:24	(Note: For the LFA Middleweight Championship.)
Lightweight	Dedrek Sanders	def.	Nikolay Kiosse	TKO (knees to the body)	3	0:20
Women's Strawweight	Mackenzie Stiller	def.	Kendra McIntyre	Submission (scarf hold armlock)	1	1:48
Heavyweight	Charlie Cleveland	def.	Ben Wunder	TKO (punches)	1	1:03
Middleweight	Zayne Havener	def.	Travon Eller	Submission (triangle choke)	1	3:33
Flyweight	Bryce Woerner	def.	Randy Rivera-Santiago	TKO (punches)	3	3:36
Preliminary card (YouTube / Spectation Sports)
Lightweight	Johnathan Waid	def.	Lane Roe	Submission (armbar)	1	1:02
Featherweight	Alexander Schenk	def.	Carter Beekman	Submission (rear-naked choke)	2	4:50	(Note: Schenk missed weight (147.6 lb).)
Heavyweight	Blake Mitchell	def.	Nathan George	TKO (knee and punches)	1	2:15
Featherweight	Briven Sullivan	def.	Cody Noel	Technical Submission (triangle choke)	3	4:51
Flyweight	Shamar Perez	def.	Trevor Grice	Decision (split) (29–28, 28–29, 29–28)	3	5:00
Amateur bouts
Middleweight	Drake Patterson	def.	Josh Ward	TKO (punches)	1	2:41
Lightweight	Garret Gean	def.	Randy Shores Jr.	Submission (triangle choke)	1	1:15

== LFA 227: Nascimento vs. Kamikubo ==
LFA 227: Nascimento vs. Kamikubo
- Promotion: Legacy Fighting Alliance
- Date: February 27, 2026
- Venue: Ventura County Fairgrounds
- City: Ventura, California, United States

LFA 227: Nascimento vs. Kamikubo was a mixed martial arts event promoted by Legacy Fighting Alliance that took place on February 27, 2026, in Ventura, California, United States.

=== Background ===
The event marked the promotion's second visit to Ventura and first since LFA 215 in August 2025.

The event headliner featured a bantamweight bout between Rafael do Nascimento and Shuya Kamikubo.

=== Results ===
Main card (Vice TV)
Weight class				Method	Round	Time	Notes
Bantamweight	Rafael do Nascimento	def.	Shuya Kamikubo	Decision (unanimous) (30–27, 30–27, 30–27)	3	5:00
Bantamweight	Allan Begosso	def.	Arnold Jimenez	TKO (punches)	2	3:34	(Note: Jimenez missed weight (138.4 lb).)
Middleweight	Theo Haig	def.	Lance Wright	Submission (rear-naked choke)	2	1:03
Women's Flyweight	Mariana Poltronieri Piccolo	def.	Zoe Nowicki	Decision (unanimous) (30–27, 30–27, 29–28)	3	5:00
Lightweight	Luis Gomez	def.	Kohl Laren	KO (punches)	1	1:44
Light Heavyweight	Shealor Ladd	def.	Isaiah Pinson	TKO (punches)	2	3:17
Featherweight	Roman Puga	def.	Hamzeh Trad	TKO (punches)	2	4:11
Preliminary card (YouTube / Spectation Sports)
Light Heavyweight	Kyle Clark	def.	Sam Fournier	TKO (head kick and punches)	1	3:40
Welterweight	Dupree Stewart	def.	Jon Tabarez	Submission (armbar)	1	4:32
Light Heavyweight	Ryan Firinaiu	def.	Christopher Collins	TKO (punches)	3	0:26

== LFA 228: Natividad vs. Garcia ==
LFA 228: Natividad vs. Garcia
- Promotion: Legacy Fighting Alliance
- Date: March 13, 2026
- Venue: Gila River Resorts and Casinos – Wild Horse Pass
- City: Chandler, Arizona, United States

LFA 228: Natividad vs. Garcia was a mixed martial arts event promoted by Legacy Fighting Alliance that took place on March 13, 2026, in Chandler, Arizona, United States.

=== Background ===
The event marked the promotion's fourth visit to Chandler and first since LFA 188 in July 2024.

A flyweight bout between undefeated prospect Christian Natividad and Adrian Garcia headlined the event.

=== Results ===
Main card (Vice TV)
Weight class				Method	Round	Time	Notes
Flyweight	Christian Natividad	def.	Adrian Garcia	Decision (unanimous) (30–27, 30–27, 30–27)	3	5:00
Catchweight (140 lb)	Carlos Tardio	def.	Amari Sengsavanh	Decision (unanimous) (29–28, 29–28, 29–28)	3	5:00	(Note: Tardio missed weight (140.4 lb).)
Lightweight	Benjamin Orozco	ded.	JaCobi Jones	Submission (rear-naked choke)	1	2:58
Women's Strawweight	Aleksandra Savicheva	def.	Leslie Hernandez	Decision (unanimous) (29–28, 29–28, 30–27)	3	5:00
Middleweight	Andrew Stewart	def.	Christopher Ewert	TKO (punches)	1	0:58	(Note: Ewert missed weight (189.2 lb).)
Flyweight	Lívio Ribeiro	def.	Jordan Burkholder	Decision (unanimous) (30–27, 29–28, 29–28)	3	5:00
Preliminary card (YouTube / Spectation Sports)
Light Heavyweight	Alik Lorenz	def.	Gabriel Thimoteo	TKO (punches)	1	0:24
Middleweight	Zayne Havener	def.	Eric Fimbres	Submission (rear-naked choke)	1	3:11
Catchweight (195 lb)	Marcus Nash	def.	Israel Aquino	KO (punch)	1	1:08
Amateur bouts
Catchweight (160 lb)	Mitchell Wheeler	def.	Alex Ortiz	Submission (rear-naked choke)	1	2:20

== LFA 229: Martins vs. Gonçalves ==
LFA 229: Martins vs. Gonçalves
- Promotion: Legacy Fighting Alliance
- Date: March 27, 2026
- Venue: Centro Esportivo Pelezão
- City: São Paulo, Brazil

LFA 229: Martins vs. Gonçalves was a mixed martial arts event promoted by Legacy Fighting Alliance that took place on March 29, 2026, in São Paulo, Brazil.

=== Background ===
The event marked the promotion's first visit to São Paulo.

A welterweight bout between Richard Martins and Vanderlei Gonçalves headlined the event.

=== Results ===
Main card (Vice TV)
Weight class				Method	Round	Time	Notes
Welterweight	Richard Martins	def.	Vanderlei Gonçalves	TKO (punches)	3	4:04
Flyweight	Felipe dos Santos	def.	Jenilton Matos	Submission (triangle choke)	1	1:43	(Note: Matos missed weight (127 lb).)
Bantamweight	Vinicius Pires	def.	Tawan Régis Ribeiro	Decision (unanimous) (30–27, 30–27, 30–27)	3	5:00
Catchweight (175 lb)	Diego Bianchini	def.	Yuri Neles	Submission (heel hook)	1	2:56
Featherweight	Renan Freitas	def.	Leandro Solano	TKO (punches)	1	4:41
Women's Flyweight	Bianca Basílio	def.	Rafaela Guedes	Submission (rear-naked choke)	1	3:36
Preliminary card (YouTube / Spectation Sports)
Heavyweight	Guilherme Uriel	def.	Leonardo Fraga	TKO (punches)	1	1:36
Lightweight	Richard Silva	def.	Italo Cruz	Technical Submission (keylock)	3	2:34	(Note: Cruz missed weight (159 lb).)
Women's Bantamweight	Djulia Ariana	def.	Milena Galvão	Decision (unanimous) (29–28, 29–28, 29–28)	3	5:00
Bantamweight	Leslie de Jesus	def.	Maycon Douglas Siqueira	Decision (unanimous) (30–27, 30–27, 29–28)	3	5:00
Light Heavyweight	Alan Ribeiro	def.	Douglas Andrew	TKO (punches)	1	0:55
Flyweight	Cláudio Bento de Meireles	def.	João Victor Melo	Decision (unanimous) (30–27, 30–27, 30–27)	3	5:00	(Note: Melo missed weight (127.6 lb).)
Women's Bantamweight	Thalyta Silva	def.	Maria Clara Andrade	Decision (unanimous) (30–26, 30–26, 30–26)	3	5:00

== LFA 230: Bartling vs. Cleveland ==
LFA 230: Bartling vs. Cleveland
- Promotion: Legacy Fighting Alliance
- Date: April 3, 2026
- Venue: Grand Casino Hotel & Resort
- City: Shawnee, Oklahoma, United States

LFA 230: Bartling vs. Cleveland was a mixed martial arts event promoted by Legacy Fighting Alliance that took place on April 3, 2026, in Shawnee, Oklahoma, United States.

=== Background ===
The event marked the promotion's 15th visit to Shawnee and first since LFA 152 in February 2023.

A bantamweight bout between Xavier Franklin and returning veteran Micaias Ureña was scheduled to headline the event. However, the bout has been scratched for unknown reasons.

As a results, a heavyweight bout between Nyle Bartling and Charlie Cleveland served as the new main event.

=== Results ===
Main card (Vice TV)
Weight class				Method	Round	Time	Notes
Heavyweight	Charlie Cleveland	def.	Nyle Bartling	KO (punches)	1	3:09
Middleweight	David Wright	def.	John Moore	Submission (rear-naked choke)	1	4:43
Middleweight	Jake Woodley	def.	Shane Sobnosky Jr.	Decision (unanimous) (30–27, 30–26, 30–24)	3	5:00
Featherweight	Elias Rodriguez	def.	Nick Fields	TKO (punches)	1	0:36
Catchweight (195 lb)	Finn Martin	def.	Chris Conners	TKO (punches)	3	3:41
Preliminary card (YouTube / Spectation Sports)
Welterweight	Austin Miller	def.	Ethan Moore	TKO (elbow and punches)	2	3:24
Catchweight (138 lb)	Nicholas O'Brien	def.	Jose Intriago	Decision (unanimous) (29–28, 29–28, 29–28)	3	5:00
Featherweight	Malik Thompson	def.	Alpha Yero Mansare	TKO (elbows)	3	3:18
Amateur bouts
Bantamweight	Jason Eubanks	def.	Gage Nolan	Submission (kneebar)	1	2:48
Lightweight	Garrett Gean	def.	Carson Rodnett	Submission (armbar)	2	2:14
Flyweight	Kanean Catron	def.	Joseph Hobbs	Submission (guillotine choke)	1	0:49

== LFA 231: Lozej vs. Ibarra ==
LFA 231: Lozej vs. Ibarra
- Promotion: Legacy Fighting Alliance
- Date: April 17, 2026
- Venue: Mystic Lake Casino Hotel
- City: Prior Lake, Minnesota, United States

LFA 231: Lozej vs. Ibarra was a mixed martial arts event promoted by Legacy Fighting Alliance that took place on April 17, 2026, in Prior Lake, Minnesota, United States.

=== Background ===
A featherweight bout between Taner Trembley and former LFA Featherweight Champion Elijah Johns was scheduled to headline the event. However, Johns withdrew from the event due to an illness. As a result, Trembley faced Korey Taylor, who scheduled to face Daniel Holt (also withdrew due to weight issues) in a 160-pound catchweight bout after both fighters weighed in at similar weights.

The event was promoted a flyweight bout between Devon Lozej and Ernesto Ibarra to serve as the new headliner.

=== Results ===
Main card (Vice TV / ESPN Deportes)
Weight class				Method	Round	Time	Notes
Flyweight	Devon Lozej	def.	Ernesto Ibarra	TKO (punches)	2	1:46
Catchweight (160 lb)	Taner Trembley	def.	Korey Taylor	TKO (knees and punches)	2	2:25
Lightweight	Nikita Kulshin	def.	Junior Melo	TKO (punches)	1	0:36
Lightweight	Steve Collins	def.	Cole Faust	Decision (unanimous) (29–28, 29–28, 30–27)	3	5:00
Heavyweight	Richard Harris	def.	Philip Latu	Submission (guillotine choke)	2	4:01
Lightweight	Canon Swanson	def.	Quintin Richards	TKO (body kick and punches)	1	2:01
Preliminary card (Spectation Sports)
Lightweight	Kelton Sneve	def.	Cedric Katambwa	Decision (unanimous) (29–28, 29–28, 29–28)	3	5:00
Catchweight (150 lb)	Noah Gasho	def.	Miljan Djukanovic	Decision (unanimous) (30–27, 29–28, 29–28)	3	5:00
Flyweight	Oscar Jurado Sánchez	def.	Yermakhan Oryntaev	KO (head kick)	1	0:15	(Note: Oryntaev missed weight (127.4 lb).)
Heavyweight	Ezayah Gomez Oropeza	def.	Lorenzo Figueroa	TKO (body kick and punches)	1	1:46
Lightweight	Ralph Hernandez III	def.	Jeremiah Huff	TKO (punches)	1	4:53
Amateur bouts
Catchweight (150 lb)	Samuel Bailey Jr.	def.	Santana Acosta	TKO (body kick and punches)	3	2:55
Flyweight	Gunnar Nelson	def.	Erick Medrano	Submission (rear-naked choke)	1	1:58
Women's Featherweight	Kayara Hartfield	def.	Jessie Hays	TKO (punches)	2	0:45

== LFA 232: Visconde vs. Pintos ==
LFA 232: Visconde vs. Pintos
- Promotion: Legacy Fighting Alliance
- Date: May 15, 2026
- Venue: Foxwoods Resort Casino
- City: Mashantucket, Connecticut, United States

LFA 232: Visconde vs. Pintos was a mixed martial arts event promoted by Legacy Fighting Alliance that took place on May 15, 2026, in Mashantucket, Connecticut, United States.

=== Background ===
The event marked the promotion's third visit to Mashantucket and first since LFA 222 in November 2025.

A LFA Featherweight Championship bout for the vacant title between Erick Visconde and Gustavo Pintos headlined the event.

=== Results ===
Main card (Vice TV / ESPN Deportes)
Weight class				Method	Round	Time	Notes
Featherweight	Erick Visconde	def.	Gustavo Pintos	Decision (split) (46–49, 49–46, 48–47)	5	5:00	(Note: For the vacant LFA Featherweight Championship.)
Lightweight	Vinicius Cenci	def.	Nathan Ghareeb	Decision (unanimous) (30–27, 30–27, 30–27)	3	5:00
Welterweight	Ansar Khamzaev	def.	Jordon Tague	Submission (rear-naked choke)	1	1:36
Lightweight	Adam Livingston	def.	Kyle Pufahl	KO (spinning back elbow)	2	3:58
Lightweight	Abbas Abasov	def.	Regivaldo Carvalho	KO (punch)	2	1:56
Welterweight	Luis Francischinelli	def.	Travis Arrellano	KO (punch)	2	2:04
Preliminary card (Spectation Sports)
Women's Strawweight	Sophie Lang	def.	Ashley Barrett	Decision (unanimous) (30–27, 30–27, 29–28)	3	5:00
Welterweight	Elton Dedaj	def.	Melvin Jovel	KO (spinning back elbow)	2	3:37
Featherweight	Rodrigo Brauna	def.	David Evenson	KO (punches)	1	4:24
Light Heavyweight	Austin Ross	def.	Trevor Linderman	Decision (unanimous) (30–27, 30–27, 30–27)	3	5:00

== LFA 233: Piersma vs. Bianchini ==
LFA 233: Piersma vs. Bianchini
- Promotion: Legacy Fighting Alliance
- Date: May 22, 2026
- Venue: Seneca Allegany Casino
- City: Salamanca, New York, United States

LFA 233: Piersma vs. Bianchini was a mixed martial arts event promoted by Legacy Fighting Alliance that took place on May 22, 2026, in Salamanca, New York, United States.

=== Background ===
The event marked the promotion's third visit to Salamanca and first since LFA 211 in June 2025.

A LFA Welterweight Championship bout between current champion Jonathan Piersma and Martin Camilo was scheduled to headline the event. However, Camilo withdrew due to an injury and was replaced by Diego Bianchini. At the weigh-ins, Piersma weighed in at 172.6 pounds, 2.6 pounds over the welterweight title fight limit. As a results, Piersma was stripped of the title and the bout proceeded with the title available only Bianchini was eligible to win it.

In addition, a LFA Lightweight Championship bout between current champion Richie Miranda and Robert Varricchio served as the co-main event.

=== Results ===
Main card (Vice TV / ESPN Deportes)
Weight class				Method	Round	Time	Notes
Welterweight	Jonathan Piersma	def.	Diego Bianchini	TKO (punches)	3	1:05	(Note: For the vacant LFA Welterweight Championship. Piersma missed weight (172.6 lb) and was stripped of the title, only Bianchini was eligible to win the title.)
Lightweight	Richie Miranda (c)	def.	Robert Varricchio	Submission (bulldog choke)	2	1:02	(Note: For the LFA Lightweight Championship.)
Featherweight	Roman Kurashvili	def.	Ezequiel de Jesus Peralta	DQ (illegal knee)	2	4:58
Catchweight (160 lb)	Stanley Dorsainvil	def.	Daniel Holt	TKO (punches)	3	4:06
Lightweight	Ednilson Santos	def.	Shaheen Santana	Decision (unanimous) (29–28, 29–28, 29–28)	3	5:00
Preliminary card (Spectation Sports)
Featherweight	Soufiane Kabil	def.	Eliab Evangelista	Decision (unanimous) (29–28, 29–28, 29–28)	3	5:00	(Note: Kabil missed weight (146.6 lb).)
Lightweight	Kevin Carrier	def.	Zaki Mohsin	Submission (guillotine choke)	3	1:56	(Note: Mohsin missed weight (159.4 lb).)
Catchweight (160 lb)	Allen Holloway	def.	Jake Hixenbaugh	Technical Submission (brabo choke)	1	3:07
Lightweight	Clayton Lee	def.	Easton Edmond	KO (punch)	1	0:44	(Note: Edmond missed weight (157.8 lb).)

== LFA 234: Fernando vs. Soares ==
LFA 234: Fernando vs. Soares
- Promotion: Legacy Fighting Alliance
- Date: May 29, 2026
- Venue: Ginásio do Povilho
- City: Cajamar, Brazil

LFA 234: Fernando vs. Soares was a mixed martial arts event promoted by Legacy Fighting Alliance that took place on May 29, 2026, in Cajamar, Brazil.

=== Background ===
A LFA Light Heavyweight Championship bout between current champion (also former LFA Middleweight Champion) Lucas Fernando and Leon Soares headlined the event.

An interim LFA Lightweight Championship bout between current interim champion Jefferson Nascimento and Gian Maurente served as the co-main event.

=== Results ===
Main card (Vice TV / ESPN Deportes)
Weight class				Method	Round	Time	Notes
Light Heavyweight	Lucas Fernando (c)	def.	Leon Soares	TKO (leg kick and punches)	1	1:28	(Note: For the LFA Light Heavyweight Championship.)
Lightweight	Jefferson Nascimento (ic)	def.	Gian Maurente	KO (front kick to the body)	4	2:00	(Note: For the interim LFA Lightweight Championship.)
Bantamweight	Mateus Soares	def.	Edson dos Anjos	TKO (punches)	1	2:48
Lightweight	Juliano Prescendo	def.	Leonardo Cavalheiro da Silva	Decision (unanimous) (30–27, 30–27, 30–27)	3	5:00
Catchweight (150 lb)	Cássio Barão Jr.	def.	João Souza	KO (punches)	1	1:33	(Note: Barão missed weight (154.8 lb).)
Featherweight	Icaro Brito	def.	Edgar Oliveira	TKO (punch)	2	1:42	(Note: Oliveira missed weight (147 lb).)
Preliminary card (Spectation Sports)
Flyweight	Lincon Santos	def.	Ivan Alves	Decision (unanimous) (30–27, 30–27, 30–27)	3	5:00
Featherweight	Eduardo Fiuza Dutra	def.	Stefan Magalhães	Submission (rear-naked choke)	1	3:50
Middleweight	Douglas da Lapa	def.	Emerson Richard	TKO (punches)	2	4:07
Middleweight	Maicon Patrício de Jesus	def.	Gustavo Rocha	Submission (rear-naked choke)	1	3:19
Flyweight	Jean Sevalho	def.	Douglas da Silva	Decision (unanimous) (29–28, 29–28, 30–27)	3	5:00
Middleweight	Felipe Rosa	def.	Celito Nascimento	TKO (punches)	1	4:28
Women's Strawweight	Laisa Silva	def.	Laryssa Leila	Decision (unanimous) (29–28, 29–28, 30–27)	3	5:00

== LFA 235: Stewart vs. Havener ==
LFA 235: Stewart vs. Havener
- Promotion: Legacy Fighting Alliance
- Date: June 19, 2026
- Venue: Freedom Hall
- City: Louisville, Kentucky, United States

LFA 235: Stewart vs. Havener was a mixed martial arts event promoted by Legacy Fighting Alliance that took place on June 19, 2026, in Louisville, Kentucky, United States.

=== Background ===
The event marked the promotion's third visit to Louisville and first since LFA 210 in June 2025.

A lightweight bout between Ilay Barzilay and Landry Ward was scheduled to headline this event. However, the bout was cancelled due to an injury. Therefore, a middleweight bout between Andrew Stewart and Zayne Havener served as the new headliner.

=== Results ===
Main card (Vice TV / ESPN Deportes)
Weight class				Method	Round	Time	Notes
Middleweight	Zayne Havener	def.	Andrew Stewart	Submission (arm-triangle choke)	2	1:39
Middleweight	Jake Woodley	def.	David Wright	KO (punch)	1	0:04
Lightweight	Wilson Lopshire	def.	William Davis	TKO (submission to punches)	2	0:44	(Note: Davis missed weight (161.2 lb).)
Featherweight	Kēstin McClain	def.	Mark Antonelli	Decision (unanimous) (30–27, 30–27, 29–28)	3	5:00	(Note: McClain missed weight (147 lb).)
Flyweight	Erik Calvert	def.	Bryce Woerner	Submission (triangle choke)	1	3:10
Catchweight (190 lb)	David Richardson	def.	Jimmy Pace Jr.	Decision (split) (29–28, 28–29, 29–28)	3	5:00
Preliminary card (Spectation Sports)
Flyweight	Edwin Jimenez	def.	Tyler Forsythe	Decision (unanimous) (30–27, 30–27, 29–28)	3	5:00
Flyweight	Tyler Stout	def.	Scott Calvert	TKO (punches)	1	4:40
Welterweight	Isaiah Watkins	def.	Anthony McCormick	KO (knees and punches)	2	1:51	(Note: Watkins missed weight (172.8 lb).)
Heavyweight	Alexander Collett	def.	Blake Mitchell	Submission (guillotine choke)	1	3:39
Amateur bouts
Welterweight	Liam Aunan	def.	Todd Pickett	TKO (punches)	1	2:44
Featherweight	Jacob Yancey	def.	Dustin Mahan	Decision (split) (28–29, 29–28, 29–28)	3	3:00
Catchweight (165 lb)	Eric Moore	def.	Carson Rainwater	TKO (punches)	2	2:12

== LFA 236: Ikei vs. Parra ==
LFA 236: Ikei vs. Parra
- Promotion: Legacy Fighting Alliance
- Date: June 26, 2026
- Venue: Arizona Financial Theatre
- City: Phoenix, Arizona, United States

LFA 236: Ikei vs. Parra was a mixed martial arts event promoted by Legacy Fighting Alliance that took place on June 26, 2026, in Phoenix, Arizona, United States.

=== Background ===
A bantamweight bout between Aziz Osorbek Uulu and Eduardo Torres was scheduled to headline this event. However, the bout has been cancelled after Osorbek Uulu failed to make weight for the limit. As a results, a 150 pounds catchweight bout between Francisco Hernandez and Jose Torres was elevated to main event instead. In turn, the promotion announced that the bout was removed from the event after Torres failed a pre-fight drug test. Therefore, a flyweight bout between Chance Ikei and Enrique Pacheco Parra was promoted to new headliner.

=== Results ===
Main card (Vice TV / ESPN Deportes)
Weight class				Method	Round	Time	Notes
Flyweight	Chance Ikei	def.	Enrique Pacheco Parra	Decision (unanimous) (29–28, 29–28, 29–28)	3	5:00
Catchweight (130 lb)	Kevin Fernandez	def.	Kyle Estrada	Decision (split) (27–30, 29–28, 29–28)	3	5:00	(Note: Estrada missed weight (133.8 lb).)
Middleweight	Delton Kaufmann	def.	Chaz Polson	TKO (punches)	2	3:15
Middleweight	Marcus Nash	def.	Moses Afoa	Decision (unanimous) (29–28, 29–28, 29–28)	3	5:00
Preliminary card (Spectation Sports)
Featherweight	Paul Marghitas	def.	Quest Truxton	Decision (unanimous) (30–27, 29–28, 29–28)	3	5:00
Flyweight	Aiden Ingram	def.	Yevgeni Shinkarevsky	KO (punches)	1	3:38	(Note: Ingram missed weight (126.6 lb).)
Flyweight	Yve Nelson	def.	Jared Braun	Decision (unanimous) (29–28, 29–28, 29–28)	3	5:00
Postliminary card: Amateur bouts
Lightweight	Jacob Lagoa	def.	Mitchell Wheeler	Decision (unanimous) (30–27, 30–27, 30–27)	3	3:00
Women's Strawweight	Genesis Cejudo	def.	Lisa Melendez	TKO (punches)	1	0:11	(Note: Both fighters missed weight: Cejudo (117 lb) and Melendez (119.2 lb).)

== LFA 237: Lee vs. Tardio ==
LFA 237: Lee vs. Tardio
- Promotion: Legacy Fighting Alliance
- Date: July 24, 2026
- Venue: La Crosse Center
- City: La Crosse, Wisconsin, United States

LFA 237: Lee vs. Tardio was a mixed martial arts event promoted by Legacy Fighting Alliance that took place on July 24, 2026, in La Crosse, Wisconsin, United States.

=== Background ===
The event marked the promotion's first visit to La Crosse.

A catchweight bout of 140 pounds between Macksom Lee and Carlos Tardio headlined this event.

=== Results ===
Main card (Vice TV / ESPN Deportes)
Weight class				Method	Round	Time	Notes
Catchweight (140 lb)	Macksom Lee	def.	Carlos Tardio	Decision (unanimous) (30–27, 30–27, 30–27)	3	5:00	(Note: Tardio missed weight (142.4 lb).)
Lightweight	Kegan Gennrich	def.	Jose Mendez	Decision (unanimous) (30–27, 30–27, 30–26)	3	5:00	(Note: Mendez missed weight (157 lb).)
Middleweight	Preston LaGrange	def.	Dylan Diebitz	Submission (rear-naked choke)	2	3:54
Welterweight	Joey Hart	def.	James Martin	Decision (unanimous) (29–28, 29–28, 29–28)	3	5:00
Lightweight	Ray Hayes	def.	Nathan Trepagnier	KO (knee to the body)	1	2:18
Heavyweight	Luther Egerson	def.	Ezayah Gomez Oropeza	TKO (doctor stoppage)	2	5:00
Preliminary card (Spectation Sports)
Women's Strawweight	Cara Greenwell	def.	Jaida Harshman	TKO (elbows)	2	4:18
Flyweight	Oscar Jurado Sánchez	def.	Braden Aupuni Pagaoa	Submission (rear-naked choke)	2	1:44
Featherweight	Dylan Smerillo	def.	Felipe Martinez Donis	Submission (triangle choke)	1	2:39	(Note: Both fighters missed weight: Martinez Donis (151.6 lb) and Smerillo (149.7 lb).)
Lightweight	Kendall Whited	def.	Tysen Herken	Decision (unanimous) (29–28, 29–28, 30–27)	3	5:00
Welterweight	Jeremy Landowski	def.	Tremaine Jackson	TKO (elbows and punches)	1	2:29
Amateur bouts
Light Heavyweight	Reed Parrish	def.	Jainer Ruiz-Jimenez	TKO (punches)	1	2:06
Featherweight	Edward Montes	def.	Alex Zapata	TKO (doctor stoppage)	3	0:11

== LFA 238: Distrito #1 ==
LFA 238: Distrito #1
- Promotion: Legacy Fighting Alliance
- Date: July 31, 2026
- Venue: Nilson Nelson Gymnasium
- City: Brasília, Brazil

LFA 238: Distrito #1 was a mixed martial arts event promoted by Legacy Fighting Alliance that took place on July 31, 2026, in Brasília, Brazil.

=== Background ===
A bantamweight bout between Herbeth Sousa and Paulo Portillo headlined this event.

=== Results ===
Main card (Vice TV / ESPN Deportes)
Weight class				Method	Round	Time	Notes
Bantamweight	Herbeth Sousa	def.	Paulo Portillo	Technical Submission (reverse arm-triangle choke)	1	4:55
Welterweight	Gabriel Vinicius	def.	Claudio Nardo	TKO (elbows and punches)	2	0:42
Featherweight	Leonardo Cerboni	def.	Wily Pereira	Decision (unanimous) (30–27, 30–27, 30–27)	3	5:00	(Note: Cerboni missed weight (150.8 lb).)
Lightweight	Juan Pablo Vieira	def.	Eduardo Terêncio	Submission (rear-naked choke)	1	1:52
Bantamweight	Daniel Araújo	def.	Victor Gabriel	Decision (unanimous) (29–28, 29–28, 29–28)	3	5:00
Featherweight	Aristides Vinícius	def.	Alexsandro Cangaty	TKO (punches to the body)	2	3:26
Middleweight	Felipe Rosa	def.	Rayan Kadosoe	KO (punch)	1	3:32
Preliminary card (Spectation Sports)
Middleweight	Marcio Cabral	def.	Rômulo Oliveira	Decision (unanimous) (30–27, 29–28, 29–28)	3	5:00
Catchweight (130 lb)	Wendrio da Silva Chaves	def.	Thiago Taveira	TKO (punches)	2	4:06
Women's Flyweight	Ana Carolina Araújo	def.	Ramana Toscanelli	Decision (unanimous) (29–28, 29–28, 29–28)	3	5:00
Bantamweight	Almir Augusto	def.	Neto Lopes	KO (punch)	3	3:36	(Note: Augusto missed weight (136.6 lb).)
Early preliminary card (Non-televised)
Lightweight	Pedro Victor de Souza	def.	Pedro Ribeiro	TKO (punches)	1	4:32
Flyweight	Ricardo Lemos	def.	Diego Silva Costa	Submission (triangle choke)	1	1:10
Women's Strawweight	Júlia Barros	def.	Amanda Rafaela	Decision (split) (29–28, 28–29, 29–28)	3	5:00

== LFA 239: Mecate vs. Exposito ==
LFA 239: Mecate vs. Exposito
- Promotion: Legacy Fighting Alliance
- Date: August 21, 2026
- Venue: Ventura County Fairgrounds
- City: Ventura, California, United States

LFA 239: Mecate vs. Exposito was a mixed martial arts event promoted by Legacy Fighting Alliance that took place on August 21, 2026, in Ventura, California, United States.

=== Background ===
The event marked the promotion's third visit to Ventura and first since LFA 227 in February 2026.

A welterweight bout between Luis Francischinelli and Jonathan Hanes was scheduled to headline this event. However, Francischinelli pulled out to received an invite to compete in the 2026 season of Dana White's Contender Series. Hanes competed at the event against Daniel Frunza and the bout was shifted to co-main event instead.

As a results, a 150 pounds catchweight bout between Chris Mecate and Manuel Exposito was promoted to serve as the event headliner.

=== Results ===
Main card (Vice TV / ESPN Deportes)
Weight class				Method	Round	Time	Notes
Catchweight (150 lb)	Chris Mecate	def.	Manuel Exposito	Decision (unanimous) (29–28, 29–28, 30–27)	3	5:00
Welterweight	Daniel Frunza	def.	Jonathan Hanes	KO (punches)	2	1:52
Lightweight	Benjamin Orozco	def.	Dzhamal Mavliudov	Decision (unanimous) (29–28, 29–28, 29–28)	3	5:00	(Note: Orozco missed weight (157.2 lb).)
Catchweight (140 lb)	Artur Gadzhikhanov	def.	Nika Sabanashvili	Decision (unanimous) (30–27, 30–27, 30–27)	3	5:00
Middleweight	Austin Clayton	def.	Irakli Kuchukhidze	Decision (unanimous) (30–27, 29–28, 29–28)	3	5:00
Welterweight	Orlando Sanders Jr.	def.	Joaquin Garcia	Submission (armbar)	3	1:20
Lightweight	Trever Devestern	def.	Edmund Kwan	Decision (unanimous) (30–27, 30–27, 30–27)	3	5:00
Preliminary card (Spectation Sports)
Flyweight	Aiden Ingram	def.	Sevak Khachatryan	Submission (guillotine choke)	2	1:23
Light Heavyweight	Christopher Collins	def.	Terrell Bosen	Submission (arm-triangle choke)	1	1:24
Heavyweight	Ryan Firinaiu	def.	Yoan Robert-Ramirez	TKO (elbows and punches)	1	4:43

== LFA 240: Sanders vs. Gomez ==
LFA 240: Sanders vs. Gomez
- Promotion: Legacy Fighting Alliance
- Date: August 28, 2026
- Venue: F&M Bank Arena
- City: Clarksville, Tennessee, United States

LFA 240: Sanders vs. Gomez was a mixed martial arts event promoted by Legacy Fighting Alliance that took place on August 28, 2026, in Clarksville, Tennessee, United States.

=== Background ===
The event marked the promotion's third visit to Clarksville and first since LFA 226 in February 2026.

A lightweight bout between Dedrek Sanders and Luis Gomez headlined this event.

=== Results ===
Main card (Vice TV / ESPN Deportes)
Weight class				Method	Round	Time	Notes
Lightweight	Dedrek Sanders	def.	Luis Gomez	Decision (unanimous) (30–27, 30–27, 30–27)	3	5:00
Featherweight	Akbarjon Islomboev	def.	Elvis Silva	Submission (rear-naked choke)	1	4:13	(Note: Islomboev missed weight (146.2 lb).)
Middleweight	Shane Sobnosky Jr.	def.	Andrew Stewart	KO (punch and elbows)	1	0:27
Featherweight	Francisco Hernandez	def.	Alexander Schenk	Decision (unanimous) (30–27, 29–28, 29–28)	3	5:00	(Note: Schenk missed weight (152 lb).)
Light Heavyweight	Finn Martin	def.	Mataeo Garner	TKO (punches)	1	4:17
Welterweight	Quadarrius McGinnis	def.	Austin Miller	Decision (unanimous) (30–27, 30–27, 30–27)	3	5:00
Preliminary card (Spectation Sports)
Light Heavyweight	Myles Dillahunty	def.	Sam Fournier	Submission (rear-naked choke)	1	1:28
Flyweight	Kue Htoo	def.	Ray Taylor	Submission (guillotine choke)	2	3:51
Lightweight	Chuy Rodriguez	def.	Jarred Gonzales	Submission (guillotine choke)	1	1:30	(Note: Gonzales missed weight (160.2 lb).)
Amateur bouts
Heavyweight	Dakota Ballard	def.	Triston Rutherford	KO (punch)	2	1:54
Lightweight	Hector Alatorre	def.	Ethan Cunningham	TKO (punches)	1	2:09
Featherweight	Ernesto Piñuelas	def.	Randy Shores Jr.	Submission (rear-naked choke)	2	0:56

== LFA 241: Pires vs. Pereira ==
LFA 241: Pires vs. Pereira
- Promotion: Legacy Fighting Alliance
- Date: September 11, 2026
- Venue: Mineirinho Arena
- City: Belo Horizonte, Brazil

LFA 241: Pires vs. Pereira was a mixed martial arts event promoted by Legacy Fighting Alliance that took place on September 11, 2026, in Belo Horizonte, Brazil.

=== Background ===
The event marked the promotion's debut in Belo Horizonte.

A LFA Bantamweight Championship bout for the vacant title between former champion Vinicius Pires and Rafael Pereira headlined the event.

=== Results ===
Main card (Vice TV / ESPN Deportes)
Weight class				Method	Round	Time	Notes
Bantamweight	Rafael Pereira	def.	Vinicius Pires	KO (punch)	2	4:50	(Note: For the vacant LFA Bantamweight Championship.)
Featherweight	Gustavo Pintos	def.	Carlos Soares	Decision (split) (30–27, 28–29, 29–28)	3	5:00
Middleweight	Neemias Santana	def.	Marcos Silva	TKO (knee and punches)	2	2:50
Middleweight	Gustavo Rocha	def.	Felipe Rosa	TKO (doctor stoppage)	2	5:00
Women's Strawweight	Raiane Vinuto	def.	Marina Monteiro	Decision (split) (29–28, 28–29, 29–28)	3	5:00
Featherweight	Eduardo Fiuza Dutra	def.	Júlio Vinicius Assunção	TKO (punches)	2	2:07
Preliminary card (Spectation Sports)
Women's Bantamweight	Thalyta Silva	def.	Mônica Carvalho Fontes	TKO (punches)	1	2:53
Lightweight	Marcos Silva	def.	Victor Firmino Santos	Submission (rear-naked choke)	1	4:40
Welterweight	Salomão Albuquerque	def.	Emerson Richard	TKO (punches)	2	0:53
Bantamweight	Fábio Perpetua	def.	Breno Yuri Santos	Decision (split) (29–28, 28–29, 29–28)	3	5:00	(Note: Perpetua missed weight (137 lb).)
Welterweight	Lucas Silva	def.	Lucas Macedo Silva	KO (punches)	1	1:12
Bantamweight	Adam Santos	def.	João Vitor Pereira	KO (flying knee)	1	3:21
Light Heavyweight	Nicollas Santos	def.	Jackson Soares	TKO (punches)	3	3:51
Women's Strawweight	Laryssa Leila	def.	Fernanda Atômica	KO (punches)	1	0:30

== LFA 242: Lozej vs. Bittencourt ==
LFA 242: Lozej vs. Bittencourt
- Promotion: Legacy Fighting Alliance
- Date: September 18, 2026
- Venue: Mystic Lake Casino Hotel
- City: Prior Lake, Minnesota, United States

LFA 242: Lozej vs. Bittencourt was a mixed martial arts event promoted by Legacy Fighting Alliance that took place on September 18, 2026, in Prior Lake, Minnesota, United States.

=== Background ===
A flyweight bout between Devon Lozej and Davi Bittencourt headlined this event.

=== Results ===
Main card (Vice TV / ESPN Deportes)
Weight class				Method	Round	Time	Notes
Flyweight	Davi Bittencourt	def.	Devon Lozej	KO (head kick)	2	4:13
Bantamweight	Marcos Breno	def.	Shuya Kamikubo	KO (punches)	1	0:21
Lightweight	Steve Collins	def.	Kevin Carrier	TKO (punches)	2	0:33
Lightweight	Kelton Sneve	def.	Julio Cesar Chaves	Decision (unanimous) (29–28, 29–28, 29–27)	3	5:00
Middleweight	Willer Alves	def.	Marcus Nash	Submission (rear-naked choke)	2	2:39	(Note: Alves missed weight (187.8 lb).)
Featherweight	Elias Rodriguez	def.	Romello Union	Decision (unanimous) (29–28, 29–28, 30–27)	3	5:00
Catchweight (150 lb)	Noah Gasho	def.	Adryen Spinks	Submission (rear-naked choke)	1	2:32
Preliminary card (Spectation Sports)
Lightweight	Allen Holloway	def.	Mitchell Wilson	Submission (brabo choke)	1	4:44
Lightweight	Augustine Hahn	def.	Luis Unzueta	Decision (unanimous) (30–27, 30–27, 30–26)	3	5:00
Welterweight	Sukhrob Iusupov	def.	Brett Bye	KO (punch)	1	2:11
Catchweight (197 lb)	Tyree Overton	def.	Marcelis Edwards	Submission (arm-triangle choke)	1	3:24
Amateur bouts
Featherweight	Xavier Rosenbloom	def.	Gift Harding	Decision (unanimous) (29–28, 29–28, 29–28)	3	5:00
Middleweight	Cadin Vowels	def.	Kaden Moon	KO (punches)	1	2:08
Flyweight	Gunnar Nelson	def.	Kyler Dunn	Submission (rear-naked choke)	1	2:35
Featherweight	Ricky Rodriguez	def.	Trey White	KO (punches)	1	1:13

== LFA 243: Maximov vs. Santos ==
LFA 243: Maximov vs. Santos
- Promotion: Legacy Fighting Alliance
- Date: October 9, 2026
- Venue: Kaiser Permanente Arena
- City: Santa Cruz, California, United States

LFA 243: Maximov vs. Santos was a mixed martial arts event promoted by Legacy Fighting Alliance that took place on October 9, 2026, in Santa Cruz, California, United States.

=== Background ===
The event marked the promotion's fifth visit to Santa Cruz and first since LFA 208 in May 2025.

A light heavyweight bout between Nick Maximov and Wildemar Santos headlined the event.

=== Results ===
Main card (Vice TV / ESPN Deportes)
Weight class				Method	Round	Time	Notes
Light Heavyweight	Nick Maximov	def.	Wildemar Santos	Decision (unanimous) (30–27, 29–28, 29–28)	3	5:00
Flyweight	Kevin Fernandez	def.	Enrique Pacheco	TKO (knee and punches)	2	1:38	(Note: Fernandez missed weight (126.6 lb).)
Flyweight	Mason Carzino-Hartshorn	def.	Kelvin Martinez	KO (punches)	1	0:30
Middleweight	Joseph Thurrott	def.	Ricky Miller	KO (punch)	1	3:12
Women's Strawweight	Sophie Lang	def.	Aysia Cortez	Submission (rear-naked choke)	2	4:32	(Note: Cortez missed weight (116.6 lb).)
Light Heavyweight	Kyle Clark	def.	Ali Gazamatov	Technical Submission (guillotine choke)	1	0:38
Heavyweight	Lorenzo Figueroa	def.	Helton José Jr.	TKO (punches)	1	3:17
Preliminary card (Spectation Sports)
Catchweight (140 lb)	Fernando Diaz-Marquez	def.	Ramon Cornejo	Decision (unanimous) (30–27, 29–28, 29–28)	3	5:00
Catchweight (175 lb)	Jacob Horton	def.	Mark Lozano	Decision (unanimous) (30–27, 30–27, 30–26)	3	5:00
Lightweight	Chris Chapa	def.	Willy LaMacchia	Decision (split) (29–28, 27–30, 29–28)	3	5:00

== LFA 244: Woodley vs. Havener ==
LFA 244: Woodley vs. Havener
- Promotion: Legacy Fighting Alliance
- Date: October 23, 2026
- Venue: Foxwoods Resort Casino
- City: Mashantucket, Connecticut, United States

LFA 244: Woodley vs. Havener was a mixed martial arts event promoted by Legacy Fighting Alliance that took place on October 23, 2026, in Mashantucket, Connecticut, United States.

=== Background ===
The event marked the promotion's fourth visit to Mashantucket and first since LFA 232 in May 2026.

A LFA Middleweight Championship bout for the vacant title between Jake Woodley and Zayne Havener headlined the event.

=== Results ===
Main card (Vice TV / FloCombat)
Weight class				Method	Round	Time	Notes
Middleweight	Jake Woodley	def.	Zayne Havener	TKO (punches)	2	4:16	(Note: For the vacant LFA Middleweight Championship.)
Welterweight	Thomas Blackorby	def.	Devan Worth	Decision (unanimous) (29–28, 29–28, 29–28)	3	5:00
Middleweight	Jansey Silva	def.	Guram Mestvirishvili	Decision (unanimous) (29–28, 29–28, 29–28)	3	5:00
Women's Strawweight	Hilarie Rose	def.	Bruna Ellen	Decision (unanimous) (30–27, 30–27, 29–28)	3	5:00
Flyweight	Oscar Jurado Sánchez	def.	Maikel Reinoso	Submission (rear-naked choke)	1	1:57
Middleweight	Guram Gochashvili	def.	Pete Keepers	TKO (punches)	1	4:47
Preliminary card (Spectation Sports)
Lightweight	Austin Halik	def.	Xavier Zeruth	Submission (ninja choke)	1	1:26
Welterweight	Luis Melendez	def.	Elton Dedaj	Decision (unanimous) (30–27, 29–28, 29–28)	3	5:00
Flyweight	Joziah Fry	def.	Yve Nelson	Decision (unanimous) (30–27, 30–27, 30–27)	3	5:00
Light Heavyweight	Austin Ross	def.	Matheus Moraes	TKO (elbows and punches)	1	3:37

== LFA 245: Khamzaev vs. Prescendo ==
LFA 245: Khamzaev vs. Prescendo
- Promotion: Legacy Fighting Alliance
- Date: October 30, 2026
- Venue: Seneca Niagara Casino & Hotel
- City: Niagara Falls, New York, United States

LFA 245: Khamzaev vs. Prescendo was a mixed martial arts event promoted by Legacy Fighting Alliance that took place on October 30, 2026, in Niagara Falls, New York, United States.

=== Background ===
The event marked the promotion's ninth visit to Niagara Falls and first since LFA 223 in November 2025.

A LFA Lightweight Championship bout for the vacant title between undefeated prospect Ansar Khamzaev and Juliano Prescendo headlined the event.

=== Results ===
Main card (Vice TV / FloSports)
Weight class				Method	Round	Time	Notes
Lightweight	Ansar Khamzaev	def.	Juliano Prescendo	Submission (brabo choke)	1	3:20	(Note: For the vacant LFA Lightweight Championship.)
Featherweight	Thomas Picciano	def.	Santos Verdinez	Decision (unanimous) (29–28, 29–28, 29–28)	3	5:00
Welterweight	Alberth Bahamondes	def.	Joey Hart	KO (punches)	1	1:00
Light Heavyweight	Wildemar Santos	def.	Sharaf Davlatmurodov	Submission (rear-naked choke)	3	3:23
Light Heavyweight	Shealor Ladd	def.	Matt Adams	Submission (rear-naked choke)	1	1:30
Preliminary card (FloSports)
Middleweight	Lance Wright	def.	David Wright	KO (punches)	1	0:52
Women's Strawweight	Aline David	def.	Naomie Young	TKO (knees)	3	3:49
Lightweight	Imed Eddine Dziri	def.	Jermaine Edwards	Decision (unanimous) (30–27, 30–27, 30–27)	3	5:00
Light Heavyweight	Isiah Veloso	def.	Delsin Gray	TKO (punches)	1	2:13

== LFA 246: Alves vs. Vinuto ==
LFA 246: Alves vs. Vinuto
- Promotion: Legacy Fighting Alliance
- Date: November 13, 2026
- Venue: Ginásio do Povilho
- City: Cajamar, Brazil

LFA 246: Alves vs. Vinuto was a mixed martial arts event promoted by Legacy Fighting Alliance that took place on November 13, 2026, in Cajamar, Brazil.

=== Background ===
A LFA Women's Strawweight Championship bout for the vacant title between undefeated prospect Natalia Alves and Raiane Vinuto headlined the event.

In addition, a LFA Welterweight Championship bout for the vacant title between João Paulo Silva and undefeated prospect Gabriel Vinicius served as the co-main event.

=== Results ===
Main card (Vice TV / FloSports)
Weight class				Method	Round	Time	Notes
Women's Strawweight	Natalia Alves	def.	Raiane Vinuto	Submission (armbar)	1	4:34	(Note: For the vacant LFA Women's Strawweight Championship.)
Welterweight	João Paulo Silva	def.	Gabriel Vinicius	Decision (unanimous) (48–47, 49–46, 49–46)	5	5:00	(Note: For the vacant LFA Welterweight Championship.)
Flyweight	Rafael Montouro	def.	Lincon Santos	TKO (punches)	2	0:27
Bantamweight	Derick Garcia Borges	def.	Fernando Noriega	TKO (punches)	2	2:33
Women's Strawweight	Laura Vasconcelos	def.	Taynara Silva	TKO (retirement)	2	0:34
Welterweight	Lucas Silva	def.	Vagner dos Santos	TKO (doctor stoppage)	2	5:00
Preliminary card (FloSports)
Women's Flyweight	Beatriz Consuli	def.	Ana Carolina Araújo	Decision (unanimous) (30–27, 29–28, 29–28)	3	5:00
Flyweight	Cláudio Meireles	def.	Adam Santos	TKO (knee to the body and punches)	1	4:43
Women's Strawweight	Laryssa Leila	def.	Isabella Araújo	Submission (rear-naked choke)	2	4:38
Lightweight	Raycon Matiele Barbosa	def.	Edson Gonçalves	KO (punch)	1	3:36
Heavyweight	Bruno de Jesus	def.	Marllon Santos	KO (elbow)	2	0:57
Featherweight	Pedro Henrique Costa	def.	Pedro Henrique Prado	Submission (heel hook)	1	1:29

== LFA 247: Breno vs. Torres ==
LFA 247: Breno vs. Torres
- Promotion: Legacy Fighting Alliance
- Date: November 20, 2026
- Venue: Arizona Financial Theatre
- City: Phoenix, Arizona, United States

LFA 247: Breno vs. Torres was a mixed martial arts event promoted by Legacy Fighting Alliance that took take place on November 20, 2026, in Phoenix, Arizona, United States.

=== Background ===
A bantamweight bout between Marcos Breno and Eduardo Torres headlined the event.

=== Results ===
Main card (Vice TV / FloSports)
Weight class				Method	Round	Time	Notes
Bantamweight	Marcos Breno	def.	Eduardo Torres	Submission (rear-naked choke)	3	0:22
Flyweight	Chance Ikei	def.	Agapito Orozco	Decision (split) (30–27, 28–29, 29–28)	3	5:00
Featherweight	Abbas Abasov	def.	Lucas Ganin	Submission (guillotine choke)	2	3:46
Lightweight	Canon Swanson	def.	Benjamin Orozco	TKO (punches)	2	2:19
Lightweight	Ray Hayes	def.	Dylan Smerillo	Submission (anaconda choke)	1	1:49
Middleweight	Delton Kaufmann	def.	Abasi Young	TKO (elbows and punches)	2	3:08
Preliminary card (FloSports)
Featherweight	Paul Marghitas	def.	Sergio Mamone Jr.	Decision (split) (29–28, 28–29, 29–28)	3	5:00
Flyweight	Zoe Nowicki	def.	Mia Grawe	Decision (unanimous) (30–27, 30–27, 29–28)	3	5:00
Featherweight	Adam Amado	def.	Erickson Quinzo	Decision (unanimous) (30–27, 29–28, 29–28)	3	5:00
Catchweight (132 lb)	Nolan Linebaugh	def.	Joseph Rivas	Submission (triangle choke)	1	4:45
Amateur bout
Catchweight (215 lb)	Talal Yousufzai	def.	Joshua Reynolds	Decision (unanimous) (30–27, 30–27, 30–27)	3	3:00

== LFA 248: Costa vs. Hartshorn ==
LFA 248: Costa vs. Hartshorn
- Promotion: Legacy Fighting Alliance
- Date: December 18, 2026
- Venue: Pearl Theater at Palms Casino Resort
- City: Paradise, Nevada, United States

LFA 248: Costa vs. Hartshorn is an upcoming mixed martial arts event promoted by Legacy Fighting Alliance that is scheduled to take place on December 18, 2026, in Paradise, Nevada, part of the Las Vegas Valley, United States.

=== Background ===
The event will mark the promotion's third visit to Las Vegas and first since LFA 203 in March 2025.

A LFA Flyweight Championship bout for the vacant title between Davi Costa and Mason Carzino-Hartshorn is scheduled to headline the event.

A LFA Light Heavyweight Championship bout for the vacant title between Shealor Ladd and Wildemar Santos is scheduled to serve as the co-main event.

=== Fight card ===
Main card (Vice TV / FloSports)
Weight class				Method	Round	Time	Notes
Flyweight	Davi Costa	vs.	Mason Carzino-Hartshorn
Light Heavyweight	Shealor Ladd	vs.	Wildemar Santos
Featherweight	Brahyam Zurcher	vs.	Damion Nelson
Lightweight	Chris Mecate	vs.	Roberto Hernandez
Middleweight	Yusuf Esembaev	vs.	Themba Gorimbo
Heavyweight	Charlie Cleveland	vs.	Luther Egerson III
Bantamweight	Artur Gadzhikhanov	vs.	Jacob Wiggins
Preliminary card (FloSports)
Featherweight	David Goldenberg	vs.	Carter Beekman
Bantamweight	Alberto Romo	vs.	Michael Jamiyandorj
Lightweight	Adrian Lyons-Lopez	vs.	Oleg Mikhov

== See also ==
- 2026 in UFC
- 2026 in Professional Fighters League
- 2026 in ONE Championship
- 2026 in Absolute Championship Akhmat
- 2026 in Konfrontacja Sztuk Walki
- 2026 in Rizin Fighting Federation
- 2026 in LUX Fight League
- 2026 in Oktagon MMA
- 2026 in Brave Combat Federation
- 2026 in UAE Warriors
- 2026 in Cage Warriors
