= Legacy Fighting Alliance =

American mixed martial arts promotion

- Current season, competition or edition: 2026 in Legacy Fighting Alliance
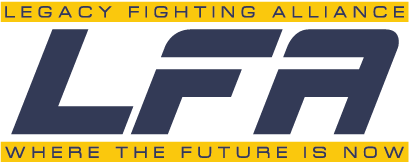
- Sport: Mixed martial arts promotion
- Founded: 2016; 10 years ago
- Founder: Ed Soares
- Owner: Private
- Country: United States
- Headquarters: Houston, Texas
- Broadcaster: Vice TV
- Website: http://www.lfa.com

The Legacy Fighting Alliance (LFA) is an American mixed martial arts (MMA) promotion company based in Houston, Texas. It was created as a result of the Legacy Fighting Championship and Resurrection Fighting Alliance merger in 2016.

== History ==
=== Resurrection Fighting Alliance ===
On October 11, 2012, officials for the Pompano Beach, Florida based MMA promotion Titan Fighting Championships (Titan FC) were acquired by the Resurrection Fighting Alliance (RFA), along with certain fighter contracts, as well as the organization's television deal with what is now AXS TV. The goal was to combine the talent of both organizations under one umbrella, the RFA. Titan FC owner and president Joe Kelly was brought in as the vice president of the newly merged company; and seasoned MMA manager and Black House gym owner, Ed Soares, acted as president. Original Titan founder Joe Kelly bought back the organization (Titan FC) in 2013 and produced two more shows on his own: Titan FC 25: Lashley vs. Asplund in June, and Titan FC 26: Hallman vs. Hornbuckle in August, both of which were aired live on AXS TV.

On November 2, 2012, RFA had its first show aired on AXS TV with Resurrection Fighting Alliance 4: Griffin vs. Escudero.

==== Events ====
#	Event	Date	Location	Venue	Main event	Championship
47	RFA 46: Jordan Johnson vs. Tucker	December 9, 2016	Branson, Missouri	Branson Convention Center	Jordan Johnson vs. Lemarcus Tucker	Light Heavyweight
46	RFA 45: Meerschaert vs. Waldon	October 28, 2016	Prior Lake, Minnesota	Mystic Lake Casino Hotel	Gerald Meerschaert vs. Chase Waldon; Raoni Barcelos (c) vs. Dan Moret	Vacant Middleweight; Featherweight
45	RFA 44: Moises vs. Freeman	September 30, 2016	St. Charles, Missouri	St. Charles Convention Center	Thiago Moises (c) vs. Zach Freeman	Lightweight
44	RFA 43: Camozzi vs. Barnes	September 9, 2016	Broomfield, Colorado	1stBank Center	Brian Camozzi vs. Nick Barnes	Vacant Welterweight
43	RFA 42: Giagos vs. Juusola	August 19, 2016	Visalia, California	Visalia Convention Center	Christos Giagos vs. Arthur Estrázulas	Non-Title Lightweight
42	RFA 41: Clark vs. Giles	July 29, 2016	San Antonio, Texas	Cowboys Dancehall	Trevin Giles vs. Josh Clark	Non-Title Middleweight
41	RFA 40: Sklavos vs. Camus	July 15, 2016	Prior Lake, Minnesota	Mystic Lake Casino Hotel	Chico Camus vs. Czar Sklavos	Non-Title Flyweight
40	RFA 39: Barcelos vs. Moffett	June 17, 2016	Hammond, Indiana	Hammond Civic Center	Raoni Barcelos (c) vs. Bobby Moffett	Featherweight
39	RFA 38: Moisés vs. Emmers	June 3, 2016	Costa Mesa, California	OC Fair & Event Center	Thiago Moisés (c) vs. Jamall Emmers	Lightweight
38	RFA 37: Viana vs. Clark	April 15, 2016	Sioux Falls, South Dakota	Sanford Pentagon	Devin Clark vs. Rafael Viana; Leandro Higo vs. Joey Miolla	Light Heavyweight; Bantamweight
37	RFA 36: Brown vs. Camus	March 4, 2016	Prior Lake, Minnesota	Mystic Lake Casino Hotel	Chico Camus vs. Matt Brown	Non Title Flyweight
36	RFA 35: Moisés vs. Castillo	February 19, 2016	Orem, Utah	UCCU Center	Thiago Moisés vs. David Castillo	Lightweight
35	RFA 34: Veličković vs. Smith	January 15, 2016	Broomfield, Colorado	1stBank Center	Bojan Veličković vs. Benjamin Smith	Welterweight
34	RFA 33: Townsend vs. Chavez	December 11, 2015	Costa Mesa, California	OC Fair & Event Center	Ernest Chavez vs. Adam Townsend	Non Title Lightweight
33	RFA 32: Blumer vs. Higo	November 6, 2015	Prior Lake, Minnesota	Mystic Lake Casino Hotel	Leandro Higo vs. Melvin Blumer	Non Title Bantamweight
32	RFA 31: Smith vs. Marunde	October 9, 2015	Las Vegas, Nevada	Downtown Las Vegas Events Center	Gilbert Smith vs. Bristol Marunde; Jocelyn Jones-Lybarger vs. Zoila Frausto	Welterweight; Women's Strawweight
31	RFA 30: Smith vs. Jardine	September 18, 2015	Lincoln, Nebraska	Pinnacle Bank Arena	Anthony Smith vs. Brock Jardine	Non Title Middleweight
30	RFA 29: USA vs. Brazil	August 21, 2015	Sioux Falls, South Dakota	Sanford Pentagon	Raoni Barcelos vs. Ricky Musgrave	Featherweight
29	RFA 28: Sanchez vs. Poppie	August 7, 2015	St. Louis, Missouri	Chase Park Plaza	Andrew Sanchez vs. John Poppie	Middleweight
28	RFA 27: Murphy vs. Brock	July 3, 2015	Boise, Idaho	CenturyLink Arena	Jesse Brock vs. Joe Murphy	Non Title Bantamweight
27	RFA 26: Smith vs. Smith	June 5, 2015	Broomfield, Colorado	1stBank Center	Gilbert Smith vs. Benjamin Smith	Welterweight
26	RFA vs. Legacy 1: Pantoja vs. Page	May 8, 2015	Robinsonville, Mississippi	Horseshoe Tunica	Alexandre Pantoja (c) vs. Damacio Page LFC (c); Luke Sanders (c) vs. Terrion Ware	Flyweight; Bantamweight
25	RFA 25: Lawrence vs. Toomer	April 10, 2015	Sioux Falls, South Dakota	Sanford Pentagon	Justin Lawrence (c) vs. Sam Toomer; Francisco France vs. Gabriel Checco	Featherweight; Middleweight
24	RFA 24: Smith vs. Romero	March 6, 2015	Prior Lake, Minnesota	Mystic Lake Casino & Hotel	Benjamin Smith vs. Indalecio Romero	Welterweight
23	RFA 23: Murphy vs. Ware	February 6, 2015	Costa Mesa, California	OC Fair & Event Center	Terrion Ware vs. Joe Murphy	Bantamweight Contender
22	RFA 22: Smith vs. Njokuani	January 9, 2015	Colorado Springs, Colorado	Broadmoor World Arena	Chidi Njokuani vs. Gilbert Smith	Welterweight; *Njokuani missed weight (title remained vacant).
21	RFA 21: Juusola vs. Baghdad	December 5, 2014	Costa Mesa, California	OC Fair & Event Center	Mehdi Baghdad vs. Zach Juusola	Lightweight
20	RFA 20: Sanders vs. Mercado	November 7, 2014	Broomfield, Colorado	1stBank Center	Luke Sanders vs. Jarred Mercado	Bantamweight
19	RFA 19: Collier vs. Checco	October 10, 2014	Prior Lake, Minnesota	Mystic Lake Casino & Hotel	Jake Collier vs. Gabriel Checco	Middleweight
18	RFA 18: Manzanares vs. Pantoja	September 12, 2014	Albuquerque, New Mexico	Albuquerque Convention Center	Alexandre Pantoja vs. Matt Manzanares (c)	Flyweight
17	RFA 17: Cochrane vs. Giagos	August 22, 2014	Sioux Falls, South Dakota	Sanford Pentagon	Christos Giagos vs. Dakota Cochrane; Justin Lawrence vs. Mark Dickman	Lightweight; Featherweight
16	RFA 16: Copeland vs. Jorgensen	July 25, 2014	Broomfield, Colorado	1stBank Center	Josh Copeland vs. Jan Jorgensen	Heavyweight
15	RFA 15: Casey vs. Sanchez	June 6, 2014	Culver City, California	Culver City Auditorium	Kevin Casey vs. Andrew Sanchez	Middleweight
14	RFA 14: Manzanares vs. Maranhão	April 11, 2014	Cheyenne, Wyoming	Cheyenne Ice and Events Center	Matt Manzanares vs. Junior Maranhao	Flyweight
13	RFA 13: Cochrane vs. Escudero	March 7, 2014	Lincoln, Nebraska	Pershing Center	Dakota Cochrane vs. Efraín Escudero	Lightweight Contender
12	RFA 12: Ortega vs. Koch	January 24, 2014	Los Angeles, California	Shrine Auditorium	Brian Ortega vs. Keoni Koch; Pedro Munhoz (c) vs. Billy Daniels	Featherweight; Bantamweight
11	RFA 11: Manzanares vs. Makovsky	November 22, 2013	Broomfield, Colorado	1stBank Center	Zach Makovsky vs. Matt Manzanares	Flyweight
10	RFA 10: Rhodes vs. Jouban	October 25, 2013	Des Moines, Iowa	Hy-Vee Hall	Mike Rhodes vs. Alan Jouban	Welterweight
9	RFA 9: Munhoz vs. Curran	August 16, 2013	Carson, California	StubHub Center	Pedro Munhoz vs. Jeff Curran	Bantamweight
8	RFA 8: Pettis vs. Pegg	June 21, 2013	Milwaukee, Wisconsin	The Rave/Eagles Club	Sergio Pettis vs. Dillard Pegg; Lance Palmer vs. Jared Downing (c)	Flyweight; Featherweight
7	RFA 7: Thatch vs. Rhodes	March 22, 2013	Broomfield, Colorado	1stBank Center	Brandon Thatch vs. Mike Rhodes	
6	RFA 6: Krause vs. Imada 2	January 18, 2013	Kansas City, Missouri	Kansas City Scottish Rite Temple	James Krause vs. Toby Imada	
5	RFA 5: Downing vs. Rinaldi	November 30, 2012	Kearney, Nebraska	Viaero Center	Jared Downing vs. Jordan Rinaldi	Featherweight
4	RFA 4: Griffin vs. Escudero	November 2, 2012	Las Vegas, Nevada	Texas Station	Tyson Griffin vs. Efraín Escudero	
3	RFA 3: Stevenson vs. Cochrane	June 30, 2012	Kearney, Nebraska	Viaero Center	Dakota Cochrane vs. Joe Stevenson	
2	RFA 2: Yvel vs. Alexander	March 30, 2012	Kearney, Nebraska	Viaero Center	Gilbert Yvel vs. Houston Alexander	
1	RFA 1: Pulver vs. Elliott	December 16, 2011	Kearney, Nebraska	Viaero Center	Tim Elliott vs. Jens Pulver	

=== Legacy Fighting Championship ===
The Legacy Fighting Championship (Legacy FC) was an American mixed martial arts promotion based in Houston, Texas, United States. The promotion has held events in: Houston, Dallas, San Antonio, Allen, Tulsa, and Duluth. Notable fighters that have fought for LFC include Carlos Diego Ferreira, Leonard Garcia, Jonathan Brookins, Daniel Pineda, Anthony Njokuani, Paul Buentello, James McSweeney, Jay Hieron, Evangelista Santos, Ray Borg, Tim Means, Henry Briones, Thomas Almeida, Derrick Lewis, Sage Northcutt, Holly Holm and Valentina Shevchenko. Its live events and competitions have been broadcast on AXS TV in the United States and Esporte Interativo in Brazil.

On July 22, 2011, Legacy FC had its first show aired on HDNet with Legacy Fighting Championship 7: Dollar vs. Prater. The organization agreed to a second extension to take them through 2016 with newly branded AXS TV.

==== Events ====
#	Event Title	Date	Location
68	Legacy Amateur Series: Black Tie Brawl 3	December 8, 2016	Dallas, Texas, United States
67	Legacy Fighting Championship 63	December 2, 2016	Tulsa, Oklahoma, United States
66	Legacy Fighting Championship 62	November 11, 2016	Oklahoma City, Oklahoma, United States
65	Legacy Fighting Championship 61	October 14, 2016	Dallas, Texas, United States
64	Legacy Fighting Championship 60	October 7, 2016	Hinckley, Minnesota, United States
63	Legacy Fighting Championship 59	September 16, 2016	Houston, Texas, United States
62	Legacy Fighting Championship 58	July 22, 2016	Lake Charles, Louisiana, United States
61	Legacy Fighting Championship 57	July 1, 2016	Bossier City, Louisiana, United States
60	Legacy Fighting Championship 56	June 24, 2016	Dallas, Texas, United States
59	Legacy Fighting Championship 55	May 13, 2016	Houston, Texas, United States
58	Legacy Fighting Championship 54	April 22, 2016	Catoosa, Oklahoma, United States
57	Legacy Fighting Championship 53	April 8, 2016	Atlanta, Georgia, United States
56	Legacy Fighting Championship 52	March 25, 2016	Lake Charles, Louisiana, United States
55	Legacy Fighting Championship 51	February 5, 2016	Hinckley, Minnesota, United States
54	Legacy Fighting Championship 50	January 22, 2016	Houston, Texas, United States
53	Legacy Fighting Championship 49	December 4, 2015	Shreveport, Louisiana, United States
52	Legacy Fighting Championship 48	November 13, 2015	Lake Charles, Louisiana, United States
51	Legacy Fighting Championship 47	October 16, 2015	Atlanta, Georgia, United States
50	Legacy Fighting Championship 46	October 2, 2015	Allen, Texas, United States
49	Legacy Fighting Championship 45	September 11, 2015	Tulsa, Oklahoma, United States
48	Legacy Fighting Championship 44	August 28, 2015	Houston, Texas, United States
47	Legacy Kickboxing 3	July 24, 2015	Houston, Texas, United States
46	Legacy Fighting Championship 43	July 17, 2015	Hinckley, Minnesota, United States
45	Legacy Fighting Championship 42	June 26, 2015	Lake Charles, Louisiana, United States
44	Legacy Kickboxing 2	May 29, 2015	Bossier City, Louisiana, United States
43	AXS TV Fights: Legacy vs. RFA Superfight	May 8, 2015	Robinsonville, Mississippi, United States
42	Legacy Fighting Championship 41	April 3, 2015	Tulsa, Oklahoma, United States
41	Legacy Fighting Championship 40	March 20, 2015	Duluth, Georgia, United States
40	Legacy Fighting Championship 39	February 27, 2015	Houston, Texas, United States
39	Legacy Fighting Championship 38	February 13, 2015	Allen, Texas, United States
38	Legacy Kickboxing 1	January 16, 2015	Houston, Texas, United States
37	Legacy Fighting Championship 37	November 14, 2014	Houston, Texas, United States
36	Legacy Fighting Championship 36	October 17, 2014	Allen, Texas, United States
35	Legacy Fighting Championship 35	September 26, 2014	Tulsa, Oklahoma, United States
34	Legacy Fighting Championship 34	August 29, 2014	Tunica, Mississippi, United States
33	Legacy Fighting Championship 33	July 18, 2014	Allen, Texas, United States
32	Legacy Fighting Championship 32	June 20, 2014	Bossier City, Louisiana, United States
31	Legacy Fighting Championship 31	June 13, 2014	Houston, Texas, United States
30	Legacy Fighting Championship 30	April 4, 2014	Albuquerque, New Mexico, United States
29	Legacy Fighting Championship 29	March 21, 2014	Tulsa, Oklahoma, United States
28	Legacy Fighting Championship 28	February 21, 2014	Arlington, Texas, United States
27	Legacy Fighting Championship 27	January 31, 2014	Houston, Texas, United States
26	Legacy Fighting Championship 26	December 6, 2013	San Antonio, Texas, United States
25	Legacy Fighting Championship 25	November 15, 2013	Houston, Texas, United States
24	Legacy Fighting Championship 24	October 11, 2013	Dallas, Texas, United States
23	Legacy Fighting Championship 23	September 13, 2013	San Antonio, Texas, United States
22	Legacy Fighting Championship 22	August 23, 2013	Lubbock, Texas, United States
21	Legacy Fighting Championship 21	July 19, 2013	Houston, Texas, United States
20	Legacy Fighting Championship 20	May 31, 2013	Corpus Christi, Texas, United States
19	Legacy Fighting Championship 19	April 12, 2013	Dallas, Texas, United States
18	Legacy Fighting Championship 18	March 1, 2013	Houston, Texas, United States
17	Legacy Fighting Championship 17	February 1, 2013	San Antonio, Texas, United States
16	Legacy Fighting Championship 16	December 14, 2012	Dallas, Texas, United States
15	Legacy Fighting Championship 15	November 16, 2012	Houston, Texas, United States
14	Legacy Fighting Championship 14	September 14, 2012	Houston, Texas, United States
13	Legacy Fighting Championship 13	August 17, 2012	Dallas, Texas, United States
12	Legacy Fighting Championship 12	July 13, 2012	Houston, Texas, United States
11	Legacy Fighting Championship 11	May 11, 2012	Houston, Texas, United States
10	Legacy Fighting Championship 10	February 24, 2012	Houston, Texas, United States
9	Legacy Fighting Championship 9	December 16, 2011	Houston, Texas, United States
8	Legacy Fighting Championship 8	September 16, 2011	Houston, Texas, United States
7	Legacy Fighting Championship 7	July 22, 2011	Houston, Texas, United States
6	Legacy Fighting Championship 6	April 9, 2011	Houston, Texas, United States
5	Legacy Fighting Championship 5	January 29, 2011	Houston, Texas, United States
4	Legacy Promotions 4	November 5, 2010	Houston, Texas, United States
3	Legacy Promotions 3	July 31, 2010	Houston, Texas, United States
2	Legacy Promotions 2	March 20, 2010	Houston, Texas, United States
1	Legacy Promotions 1	November 17, 2009	Houston, Texas, United States

== List of events ==
=== Scheduled events ===
#	Event	Date	Venue	Location
226	LFA 225: Degli vs. Aguiar	January 23, 2026	Nilson Nelson Gymnasium	Brasília, Brazil
225	LFA 224: Adams vs. Bilalov	January 16, 2026	Mystic Lake Casino Hotel	Prior Lake, Minnesota, U.S.

=== Past events ===
#	Event	Date	Venue	Location
224	LFA 223: Francischinelli vs. Piersma	November 21, 2025	Seneca Niagara Casino & Hotel	Niagara Falls, New York, U.S.
223	LFA 222: Pires vs. Belakh	November 14, 2025	Foxwoods Resort Casino	Mashantucket, Connecticut, U.S.
222	LFA 221: Clark vs. Consuli	November 7, 2025	Nilson Nelson Gymnasium	Brasília, Federal District, Brazil
221	LFA 220: Tanner vs. Cyr	October 25, 2025	Arizona Financial Theatre	Phoenix, Arizona, U.S.
220	LFA 219: Thomson vs. Islomboev	October 10, 2025	F&M Bank Arena	Clarksville, Tennessee, U.S.
219	LFA 218: Nascimento vs. Makaev	September 27, 2025	Pabellón Insular Santiago Martín	Tenerife, Spain
218	LFA 217: McKee vs. Nobre	September 12, 2025	Mystic Lake Casino Hotel	Prior Lake, Minnesota, U.S.
217	LFA 216: Silva vs. Bertolso	September 5, 2025	Musiva Cuiabá	Cuiabá, Brazil
216	LFA 215: Miranda vs. Barzilay	August 22, 2025	Ventura County Fairgrounds	Ventura, California, U.S.
215	LFA 214: Fernando vs. Latu	August 15, 2025	Sanford Pentagon	Sioux Falls, South Dakota, U.S.
214	LFA 213: Gonzalez vs. Rosales	July 26, 2025	Tachi Palace Casino Resort	Lemoore, California, U.S.
213	LFA 212: Degli vs. Severino	July 11, 2025	Ulysses Guimarães Convention Center	Brasília, Brazil
212	LFA 211: Mesquita vs. Dinwoodie	June 20, 2025	Seneca Allegany Resort and Casino	Salamanca, New York, U.S.
211	LFA 210: Lawrence vs. Reyes	June 13, 2025	Broadbent Arena	Louisville, Kentucky, U.S.
210	LFA 209: De Lara vs. Henrique	May 24, 2025	Malai Manso Resort	Cuiabá, Brazil
209	LFA 208: Mecate vs. Reyes	May 9, 2025	Kaiser Permanente Arena	Santa Cruz, California, U.S.
208	LFA 207: Lewis vs. Miranda	April 18, 2025	Sanford Pentagon	Sioux Falls, South Dakota, U.S.
207	LFA 206: Gennrich vs. Lebosnoyani	April 11, 2025	Mystic Lake Casino	Prior Lake, Minnesota, U.S.
206	LFA 205: Pires vs. Abojer	March 28, 2025	ASBAC Brasília	Brasília, Federal District, Brazil
205	LFA 204: Cunha vs. Freeman	March 22, 2025	Foxwoods Resort Casino	Mashantucket, Connecticut, U.S.
204	LFA 203: Satybaldiev vs. Soares	March 6, 2025	Palms Casino Resort	Las Vegas, Nevada, U.S.
203	LFA 202: Garcia vs. Nkuta	February 21, 2025	Seneca Niagara Casino & Hotel	Niagara Falls, New York, U.S.
202	LFA 201: Conceição vs. Silva	February 7, 2025	Ginásio do Povilho	Cajamar, São Paulo, Brazil
201	LFA 200: Johns vs. Douglas	January 25, 2025	Mystic Lake Casino	Prior Lake, Minnesota, U.S.
200	LFA 199: Farias vs. Visconde	January 10, 2025	Tachi Palace Casino Resort	Lemoore, California, U.S.
199	LFA 198: Miranda vs. Oyarzún	December 6, 2024	Commerce Casino & Hotel	Commerce, California, U.S.
198	LFA 197: Kuziutina vs. Guimarães	November 22, 2024	Ginásio do Povilho	Cajamar, Brazil
197	LFA 196: Tanner vs. Ureña	November 8, 2024	Arizona Financial Theatre	Phoenix, Arizona, U.S.
196	LFA 195: Wetzell vs. Usmonov	October 25, 2024	Dobson Arena	Vail, Colorado, U.S.
195	LFA 194: Magomedov vs. Leyva	October 18, 2024	Seneca Niagara Casino & Hotel	Niagara Falls, New York, U.S.
194	LFA 193: Bowers vs. Borisova	September 20, 2024	Mystic Lake Casino Hotel	Prior Lake, Minnesota, U.S.
193	LFA 192: Climaco vs. Dias	September 13, 2024	Kaiser Permanente Arena	Santa Cruz, California, U.S.
192	LFA 191: Prado vs. Lopes	August 30, 2024	Ginásio do Povilho	Cajamar, Brazil
191	LFA 190: Chapolin vs. Siqueira	August 23, 2024	The Commerce Casino & Hotel	Commerce, California, U.S.
190	LFA 189: Kuziutina vs. Ellen	August 2, 2024	Seneca Allegany Resort & Casino	Salamanca, New York, U.S.
189	LFA 188: Sweeney vs. do Nascimento	July 12, 2024	Wild Horse Pass Casino	Chandler, Arizona, U.S.
188	LFA 187: Brazil vs. Latin America	July 6, 2024	Ginásio do Polvilho	Cajamar, Brazil
187	LFA 186: Bekoev vs. Foxworth	June 22, 2024	Magness Arena	Denver, Colorado, U.S.
186	LFA 185: Gennrich vs. Lewis	June 7, 2024	Horseshoe Hammond	Hammond, Indiana, U.S.
185	LFA 184: Diaz vs. Lewis	May 17, 2024	The Commerce Casino & Hotel	Commerce, California, U.S.
184	LFA 183: Cantanhede vs. Guimarães	May 3, 2024	Complexo Ribalta	Rio de Janeiro, Brazil
183	LFA 182: McKee vs. Hernandez	April 26, 2024	Sanford Pentagon	Sioux Falls, South Dakota, U.S.
182	LFA 181: Siqueira vs. Hernandez	April 5, 2024	Mystic Lake Casino Hotel	Prior Lake, Minnesota, U.S.
181	LFA 180: Lawrence vs. Ward	March 29, 2024	Broadbent Arena	Louisville, Kentucky, U.S.
180	LFA 179: Neto vs. Antunes	March 23, 2024	Carioca Arena 1	Rio de Janeiro, Brazil
179	LFA 178: Satybaldiev vs. Assis	March 8, 2024	Kaiser Permanente Arena	Santa Cruz, California, U.S.
178	LFA 177: Smyth vs. Magomedov	February 23, 2024	Seneca Niagara Casino & Hotel	Niagara Falls, New York, U.S.
177	LFA 176: Johns vs. Walker	February 9, 2024	Arizona Financial Theatre	Phoenix, Arizona, U.S.
176	LFA 175: Lopes vs. Brigagão	January 27, 2024	Ginásio do Polvilho	Cajamar, Brazil
175	LFA 174: Jones vs. Gennrich	January 12, 2024	Mystic Lake Casino Hotel	Prior Lake, Minnesota, U.S.
174	LFA 173: Fernando vs. Bekoev	December 15, 2023	Palms Casino Resort	Las Vegas, Nevada, U.S.
173	LFA 172: Davis vs. Chapolin	November 17, 2023	Arizona Financial Theatre	Phoenix, Arizona, U.S.
172	LFA 171: Neves vs. Cunha	November 3, 2023	Ginásio do Polvilho	Cajamar, Brazil
171	LFA 170: Talundžić vs. Frunză	October 27, 2023	Dobson Arena	Vail, Colorado, U.S.
170	LFA 169: Ward vs. Walker	October 6, 2023	The Factory in Deep Ellum	Dallas, Texas, U.S.
169	LFA 168: McKee vs. McPadden	September 22, 2023	Mystic Lake Casino Hotel	Prior Lake, Minnesota, U.S.
168	LFA 167: Piersma vs. Smyth	September 15, 2023	Seneca Niagara Casino & Hotel	Niagara Falls, New York, U.S.
167	LFA 166: Neto vs. Conrado	September 2, 2023	Ginásio do Polvilho	Cajamar, Brazil
166	LFA 165: Compton vs. Valente	August 18, 2023	Kaiser Permanente Arena	Santa Cruz, California, U.S.
165	LFA 164: Mazo vs. Lavado	August 4, 2023	Southwest University Park	El Paso, Texas, U.S.
164	LFA 163: Johns vs. Garcia	July 21, 2023	Bell County Expo Center	Belton, Texas, U.S.
163	LFA 162: Conceição vs. Lopes	July 7, 2023	Ginásio do Polvilho	Cajamar, Brazil
162	LFA 161: Davis vs. Siqueira	June 23, 2023	The Commerce Casino & Hotel	Commerce, California, U.S.
161	LFA 160: Sweeney vs. Begosso	June 16, 2023	Owensboro Sportscenter	Owensboro, Kentucky, U.S.
160	LFA 159: Bellato vs. dos Santos	May 27, 2023	CIDE Casa Branca Sports Complex	Caraguatatuba, Brazil
159	LFA 158: Lebosnoyani vs. Jones	May 19, 2023	Gila River Resorts & Casino	Chandler, Arizona, U.S.
158	LFA 157: Croden vs. Cavalcanti	April 21, 2023	Mystic Lake Casino Hotel	Prior Lake, Minnesota, U.S.
157	LFA 156: Fuller vs. Waters	April 14, 2023	Sanford Pentagon	Sioux Falls, South Dakota, U.S.
156	LFA 155: do Nascimento vs. Hodge	March 24, 2023	Seneca Niagara Casino & Hotel	Niagara Falls, New York, U.S.
155	LFA 154: Fernando vs. Silva	March 10, 2023	Ginásio do Polvilho	Cajamar, Brazil
154	LFA 153: Mariscal vs. Faria	February 17, 2023	Horseshoe Hammond	Hammond, Indiana, U.S.
153	LFA 152: Valente vs. Bekoev	February 10, 2023	Grand Casino Hotel & Resort	Shawnee, Oklahoma, U.S.
152	LFA 151: Delano vs. Santos	January 28, 2023	Ginásio do Polvilho	Cajamar, Brazil
151	LFA 150: Farias vs. Sweeney	January 13, 2023	Mystic Lake Casino Hotel	Prior Lake, Minnesota, U.S.
150	LFA 149: Bunes vs. Horiuchi	January 6, 2023	Gila River Resorts & Casino	Chandler, Arizona, U.S.
149	LFA 148: Leyva vs. Brown	December 9, 2022	The Commerce Casino & Hotel	Commerce, California, U.S.
148	LFA 147: Melo vs. Costa	November 18, 2022	WinnaVegas Casino Resort	Sloan, Iowa, U.S.
147	LFA 146: Barbosa vs. Santos	November 4, 2022	Ginásio do Polvilho	Cajamar, Brazil
146	LFA 145: Assis vs. Murray	October 21, 2022	Oshkosh Arena	Oshkosh, Wisconsin, U.S.
145	LFA 144: Gafurov vs. Silva	October 14, 2022	Sanford Pentagon	Sioux Falls, South Dakota, U.S.
144	LFA 143: Lopes vs. Paiva	September 30, 2022	Ginásio de Esportes Geraldo Magalhães	Recife, Brazil
143	LFA 142: Amorim vs. Nichols	September 16, 2022	Mystic Lake Casino Hotel	Prior Lake, Minnesota, U.S.
142	LFA 141: Talundzic vs. Brown	September 9, 2022	Dobson Arena	Vail, Colorado, U.S.
141	LFA 140: Mota vs. Abuev	August 26, 2022	4 Bears Casino & Lodge	New Town, North Dakota, U.S.
140	LFA 139: Assenza vs. Melo	August 19, 2022	Seneca Niagara Casino & Hotel	Niagara Falls, New York, U.S.
139	LFA 138: Farias vs. Tanaka	August 5, 2022	Grand Hotel Casino & Resort	Shawnee, Oklahoma, U.S.
138	LFA 137: Gibson vs. Amil	July 29, 2022	The Commerce Casino & Hotel	Commerce, California, U.S.
137	LFA 136: Rio de Janeiro vs. São Paulo	July 15, 2022	Centro Esportivo Municipal Ubaldo Gonçalves	Caraguatatuba, Brazil
136	LFA 135: Leyva vs. Reis	July 8, 2022	Arizona Financial Theatre	Phoenix, Arizona, U.S.
135	LFA 134: Gafurov vs. Sousa	June 10, 2022	Bell County Expo Center	Belton, Texas, U.S.
134	LFA 133: Stack vs. Delano	June 3, 2022	Magness Arena	Denver, Colorado, U.S.
133	LFA 132: Gomes vs. Costa	May 13, 2022	Qualistage	Rio de Janeiro, Brazil
132	LFA 131: Argueta vs. Silva	May 6, 2022	Oshkosh Arena	Oshkosh, Wisconsin, U.S.
131	LFA 130: Ksiazkiewicz vs. Gambulino	April 22, 2022	4 Bears Casino & Lodge	New Town, North Dakota, U.S.
130	LFA 129: Petersen vs. Cortes-Acosta	April 15, 2022	Mystic Lake Casino Hotel	Prior Lake, Minnesota, U.S.
129	LFA 128: McKenzie vs. Clay	April 8, 2022	Sanford Pentagon	Sioux Falls, South Dakota, U.S.
128	LFA 127: Diaz vs. Assis	March 25, 2022	Commerce Casino	Commerce, California, U.S.
127	LFA 126: Bilharinho vs. Barbosa	March 11, 2022	Complexo Ribalta	Rio de Janeiro, Brazil
126	LFA 125: Amorim vs. Young	February 25, 2022	Seneca Niagara Casino & Hotel	Niagara Falls, New York, U.S.
125	LFA 124: Formiga vs. Bunes	February 11, 2022	Arizona Federal Theatre	Phoenix, Arizona, U.S.
124	LFA 123: Argueta vs. Santos	February 4, 2022	Horseshoe Hammond	Hammond, Indiana, U.S.
123	LFA 122: Johnson vs. Mota	January 21, 2022	The Factory at the District	St. Louis, Missouri, U.S.
122	LFA 121: Brown vs. Jones	January 14, 2022	The Factory in Deep Ellum	Dallas, Texas, U.S.
121	LFA 120: Cantuaria vs. Horth	December 10, 2021	Mystic Lake Casino Hotel	Prior Lake, Minnesota, U.S.
120	LFA 119: Silveira vs. Revel	December 3, 2021	Arizona Federal Theatre	Phoenix, Arizona, U.S.
119	LFA 118: Askar vs. Gomes	November 12, 2021	Burbank Marriott Convention Center	Burbank, California, U.S.
118	LFA 117: Dias vs. Tanaka	November 5, 2021	Visalia Convention Center	Visalia, California, U.S.
117	LFA 116: Fremd vs. Valente	October 22, 2021	Dobson Arena	Vail, Colorado, U.S.
116	LFA 115: Silveira vs. Cummins	September 24, 2021	Oshkosh Arena	Oshkosh, Wisconsin, U.S.
115	LFA 114: Souza vs. Garcia	August 27, 2021	The Factory at the District	St. Louis, Missouri, U.S.
114	LFA 113: Lewis vs. Petersen	July 30, 2021	Bell County Expo Center	Belton, Texas, U.S.
113	LFA 112: Welterweight Tournament	July 19, 2021	Upper Arena	Rio de Janeiro, Brazil
112	LFA 111: de Sa vs. Bonfim	July 16, 2021	Upper Arena	Rio de Janeiro, Brazil
111	LFA 110: Johnson vs. Horiuchi	July 2, 2021	Grand Casino Hotel & Resort	Shawnee, Oklahoma, U.S.
110	LFA 109: McKinney vs. Irizarry	June 5, 2021	Grand Casino Hotel & Resort	Shawnee, Oklahoma, U.S.
109	LFA 108: Fremd vs. Rodrigues	May 21, 2021	Sanford Pentagon	Sioux Falls, South Dakota, U.S.
108	LFA 107: Kirk vs. Swain	May 14, 2021	Sanford Pentagon	Sioux Falls, South Dakota, U.S.
107	LFA 106: Silveira vs. Viana	April 30, 2021	Grand Casino Hotel & Resort	Shawnee, Oklahoma, U.S.
106	LFA 105: Rodriguez vs. Gotsyk	April 23, 2021	Grand Casino Hotel & Resort	Shawnee, Oklahoma, U.S.
105	LFA 104: McKenzie vs. Phillips	April 16, 2021	Grand Casino Hotel & Resort	Shawnee, Oklahoma, U.S.
104	LFA 103: Carlyle vs. Dagvadorj	March 26, 2021	Grand Casino Hotel & Resort	Shawnee, Oklahoma, U.S.
103	LFA 102: Souza vs. Johns	March 19, 2021	Grand Casino Hotel & Resort	Shawnee, Oklahoma, U.S.
102	LFA 101: The Undefeated	March 12, 2021	Grand Casino Hotel & Resort	Shawnee, Oklahoma, U.S.
101	LFA 100: Altamirano vs. Smith	February 19, 2021	Hartman Arena	Park City, Kansas, U.S.
100	LFA 99: Dennis vs. Cherant	February 12, 2021	Hartman Arena	Park City, Kansas, U.S.
99	LFA 98: Fremd vs. Oliveira	January 29, 2021	Hartman Arena	Park City, Kansas, U.S.
98	LFA 97: Browne vs. Estrázulas	January 15, 2021	Hartman Arena	Park City, Kansas, U.S.
97	LFA 96: Mendonça vs. Dagvadorj	December 4, 2020	Hartman Arena	Park City, Kansas, U.S.
96	LFA 95: Pereira vs. Powell	November 20, 2020	Hartman Arena	Park City, Kansas, U.S.
95	LFA 94: Demopoulos vs. Godinez	October 30, 2020	Hartman Arena	Park City, Kansas, U.S.
94	LFA 93: Petroski vs. Jeffery	October 16, 2020	Hartman Arena	Park City, Kansas, U.S.
93	LFA 92: Wirth vs. Askar	October 2, 2020	Hartman Arena	Park City, Kansas, U.S.
92	LFA 91: Njokuani vs. Torres	September 11, 2020	Sanford Pentagon	Sioux Falls, South Dakota, U.S.
91	LFA 90: Lazishvili vs. Steele	September 4, 2020	Sanford Pentagon	Sioux Falls, South Dakota, U.S.
90	LFA 89: Moore vs. Giannetti	August 28, 2020	Sanford Pentagon	Sioux Falls, South Dakota, U.S.
89	LFA 88: Willis vs. de Jesus	August 21, 2020	Sanford Pentagon	Sioux Falls, South Dakota, U.S.
88	LFA 87: Logan vs. Rosales	July 31, 2020	Sanford Pentagon	Sioux Falls, South Dakota, U.S.
87	LFA 86: Fischer vs. Flick	July 24, 2020	Sanford Pentagon	Sioux Falls, South Dakota, U.S.
86	LFA 85: Hughes vs. Demopoulos	July 17, 2020	Sanford Pentagon	Sioux Falls, South Dakota, U.S.
85	LFA 84: Gonzales vs. Childers	July 10, 2020	Sanford Pentagon	Sioux Falls, South Dakota, U.S.
—	LFA 86: Logan vs. Rosales (cancelled)	April 17, 2020	Sanford Pentagon	Sioux Falls, South Dakota, U.S.
—	LFA 85: Gonzales vs. Bilharinho (cancelled)	April 3, 2020	1stBank Center	Broomfield, Colorado, U.S.
—	LFA 84: Madrid vs. Kasanganay (cancelled)	March 20, 2020	Arizona Financial Theatre	Phoenix, Arizona, U.S.
84	LFA 83: Jackson vs. Chaulet	March 6, 2020	The Bomb Factory	Dallas, Texas, U.S.
83	LFA 82: Polizzi vs. Pogues	February 21, 2020	Mystic Lake Casino Hotel	Prior Lake, Minnesota, U.S.
82	LFA 81: Emmers vs. Barbosa	January 31, 2020	OC Fair & Event Center	Costa Mesa, California, U.S.
81	LFA 80: Garcia vs. Marsical	January 17, 2020	Route 66 Casino Hotel	Albuquerque, New Mexico, U.S.
80	LFA 79: Royval vs. Williams	November 22, 2019	1stBank Center	Broomfield, Colorado, U.S.
79	LFA 78: Yañez vs. Estrada	November 15, 2019	Bell County Expo Center	Belton, Texas, U.S.
—	LFA 79: Diamond vs. Barbosa (cancelled)	October 11, 2019	Riverside Municipal Auditorium	Riverside, California, U.S.
—	LFA 78: Royval vs. Rivera 2 (cancelled)	October 4, 2019	1stBank Center	Broomfield, Colorado, U.S.
78	LFA 77: James vs. Martin	September 27, 2019	Mystic Lake Casino Hotel	Prior Lake, Minnesota, U.S.
77	LFA 76: Ogden vs. Browne	September 13, 2019	Hartman Arena	Park City, Kansas, U.S.
76	LFA 75: Neal vs. Cruz	September 6, 2019	Maverik Center	West Valley City, Utah, U.S.
75	LFA 74: Vanderaa vs. Ferreira	August 30, 2019	Riverside Municipal Auditorium	Riverside, California, U.S.
74	LFA 73: Lingo vs. Hatley Jr.	August 2, 2019	The Bomb Factory	Dallas, Texas, U.S.
73	LFA 72: Madrid vs. Harris	July 26, 2019	Arizona Financial Theatre	Phoenix, Arizona, U.S.
72	LFA 71: Jackson vs. Souza	July 12, 2019	Coca-Cola Roxy Theatre	Atlanta, Georgia, U.S.
71	LFA 70: Ferreira vs. Martin	June 28, 2019	The Sylvee	Madison, Wisconsin, U.S.
70	LFA 69: Pérez vs. Moreno	June 7, 2019	Morongo Casino, Resort & Spa	Cabazon, California, U.S.
69	LFA 68: Jennerman vs. Barbosa	May 31, 2019	Mystic Lake Casino Hotel	Prior Lake, Minnesota, U.S.
68	LFA 67: James vs. Martin	May 24, 2019	Branson Convention Center	Branson, Missouri, U.S.
67	LFA 66: Diamond vs. Neal	May 10, 2019	Maverik Center	West Valley City, Utah, U.S.
66	LFA 65: Royval vs. Sanchez	May 3, 2019	Dobson Arena	Vail, Colorado, U.S.
65	LFA 64: Park vs. Jackson	April 26, 2019	Sanford Pentagon	Sioux Falls, South Dakota, U.S.
64	LFA 63: Krantz vs. Patterson	March 29, 2019	Bell County Expo Center	Belton, Texas, U.S.
63	LFA 62: Kenney vs. Cachero	March 22, 2019	The Bomb Factory	Dallas, Texas, U.S.
62	LFA 61: Allen vs. Murrietta	February 22, 2019	Mystic Lake Casino Hotel	Prior Lake, Minnesota, U.S.
61	LFA 60: Anglickas vs. York	February 15, 2019	Horizon Event Center	Clive, Iowa, U.S.
60	LFA 59: Michaud vs. Aguilera	February 1, 2019	Arizona Financial Theatre	Phoenix, Arizona, U.S.
59	LFA 58: Park vs. Willis	January 25, 2019	Route 66 Casino Hotel	Albuquerque, New Mexico, U.S.
58	LFA 57: Zalal vs. Mariscal	January 18, 2019	1stBank Center	Broomfield, Colorado, U.S.
57	LFA 56: Hubbard vs. Mota	December 7, 2018	Mystic Lake Casino Hotel	Prior Lake, Minnesota, U.S.
56	LFA 55: Johns vs. Yañez	November 30, 2018	The Bomb Factory	Dallas, Texas, U.S.
55	LFA 54: Mazo vs. Yariwaki	November 16, 2018	OC Fair & Event Center	Costa Mesa, California, U.S.
54	LFA 53: Royval vs. Kenney	November 9, 2018	Arizona Financial Theatre	Phoenix, Arizona, U.S.
53	LFA 52: Rodriguez vs. Gutiérrez	October 19, 2018	Bell County Expo Center	Belton, Texas, U.S.
52	LFA 51: Gibson vs. Erak	September 28, 2018	Selland Arena	Fresno, California, U.S.
51	LFA 50: Allen vs. Hiley	September 21, 2018	Mystic Lake Casino Hotel	Prior Lake, Minnesota, U.S.
50	LFA 49: Brady vs. Urbina	September 14, 2018	Golden Nugget Atlantic City	Atlantic City, New Jersey, U.S.
49	LFA 48: Stots vs. Lilley	September 7, 2018	Viaero Center	Kearney, Nebraska, U.S.
48	LFA 47: Jackson vs. Jennerman	August 10, 2018	The Bomb Factory	Dallas, Texas, U.S.
47	LFA 46: Nakashima vs. Stewart	July 27, 2018	Felker Field Hangar at Joint Base Langley-Eustis	Newport News, Virginia, U.S.
46	LFA 45: Silva vs. Barnes	July 20, 2018	Morongo Casino, Resort & Spa	Cabazon, California, U.S.
45	LFA 44: Frincu vs. Aguilera	June 29, 2018	Arizona Financial Theatre	Phoenix, Arizona, U.S.
44	LFA 43: Allen vs. Crowe	June 22, 2018	Beaumont Civic Center	Beaumont, Texas, U.S.
43	LFA 42: Krantz vs. Kayne	June 8, 2018	Branson Convention Center	Branson, Missouri, U.S.
42	LFA 41: Moises vs. Peterson	June 1, 2018	Mystic Lake Casino Hotel	Prior Lake, Minnesota, U.S.
41	LFA 40: Aguilar vs. Le	May 25, 2018	The Bomb Factory	Dallas, Texas, U.S.
40	LFA 39: Heinisch vs. Checco	May 4, 2018	Dobson Arena	Vail, Colorado, U.S.
39	LFA 38: Hughes vs. Greene	April 27, 2018	Minneapolis Armory	Minneapolis, Minnesota, U.S.
38	LFA 37: Bice vs. Perez	April 20, 2018	Sanford Pentagon	Sioux Falls, South Dakota, U.S.
37	LFA 36: Simon vs. Zani	March 23, 2018	Morongo Casino, Resort & Spa	Cabazon, California, U.S.
36	LFA 35: Newell vs. Luque	March 9, 2018	Arena Theatre	Houston, Texas, U.S.
35	LFA 34: Watley vs. Jenkins	March 2, 2018	Mystic Lake Casino Hotel	Prior Lake, Minnesota, U.S.
34	LFA 33: Willis vs. Stewart	February 16, 2018	The Bomb Factory	Dallas, Texas, U.S.
33	LFA 32: Allen vs. Hernandez	January 26, 2018	Golden Nugget Hotel and Casino	Lake Charles, Louisiana, U.S.
32	LFA 31: Moffett vs. Le	January 19, 2018	Arizona Financial Theatre	Phoenix, Arizona, U.S.
31	LFA 30: Millender vs. Barnes	January 12, 2018	OC Fair & Event Center	Costa Mesa, California, U.S.
30	LFA 29: Camus vs. Simon	December 15, 2017	Mystic Lake Casino Hotel	Prior Lake, Minnesota, U.S.
29	LFA 28: Jackson vs. Luna	December 8, 2017	The Bomb Factory	Dallas, Texas, U.S.
28	LFA 27: Watley vs. Wilson	November 10, 2017	FireLake Arena	Shawnee, Oklahoma, U.S.
27	LFA 26: Odoms vs. Hughes	November 3, 2017	Arena Theatre	Houston, Texas, U.S.
26	LFA 25: Cochrane vs. Rodrigues	October 20, 2017	Ralston Arena	Ralston, Nebraska, U.S.
25	LFA 24: Frincu vs. Millender	October 13, 2017	Arizona Financial Theatre	Phoenix, Arizona, U.S.
24	LFA 23: Krantz vs. Nakashima	September 22, 2017	Horseshoe Bossier City Casino Hotel	Bossier City, Louisiana, U.S.
23	LFA 22: Heinisch vs. Perez	October 13, 2017	1stBank Center	Broomfield, Colorado, U.S.
22	LFA 21: Noblitt vs. Branjão	September 1, 2017	Branson Convention Center	Branson, Missouri, U.S.
21	LFA 20: Curry vs. Barnes	August 25, 2017	Mystic Lake Casino Hotel	Prior Lake, Minnesota, U.S.
20	LFA 19: Michaud vs. Rodrigues	August 18, 2017	Sanford Pentagon	Sioux Falls, South Dakota, U.S.
19	LFA 18: Aguilar vs. Rader	August 4, 2017	FireLake Arena	Shawnee, Oklahoma, U.S.
18	LFA 17: Moisés vs. Watley	July 21, 2017	Grady Cole Center	Charlotte, North Carolina, U.S.
17	LFA 16: Bedford vs. Flick	July 14, 2017	The Bomb Factory	Dallas, Texas, U.S.
16	LFA 15: Odoms vs. Vanderaa	June 30, 2017	FireLake Arena	Shawnee, Oklahoma, U.S.
15	LFA 14: Allen vs. Anders	June 23, 2017	Arena Theatre	Houston, Texas, U.S.
14	LFA 13: Millender vs. Holland	June 2, 2017	Burbank Marriott Convention Center	Burbank, California, U.S.
13	LFA 12: Krantz vs. Neumann	May 19, 2017	Mystic Lake Casino Hotel	Prior Lake, Minnesota, U.S.
12	LFA 11: Frincu vs. Mendonça	May 5, 2017	Comerica Theater	Phoenix, Arizona, U.S.
11	LFA: Sioux Falls Fight Night 1	April 29, 2017	Sanford Pentagon	Sioux Falls, South Dakota, U.S.
10	LFA 10: Heinisch vs. Rota	April 21, 2017	Massari Arena	Pueblo, Colorado, U.S.
9	LFA 9: Dennis vs. Marques	April 14, 2017	Firelake Arena	Shawnee, Oklahoma, U.S.
8	LFA 8: Hamilton vs. Bazzi	April 7, 2017	Greenville Convention Center	Greenville, South Carolina, U.S.
7	LFA 7: Sanchez vs. Mai	March 24, 2017	Arena Theatre	Houston, Texas, U.S.
6	LFA 6: Junior vs. Rodriguez	March 10, 2017	Cowboys Dancehall	San Antonio, Texas, U.S.
5	LFA 5: Edwards vs. Townsend	February 24, 2017	1stBank Center	Broomfield, Colorado, U.S.
4	LFA 4: Aguilar vs. Jackson	February 17, 2017	Horseshoe Bossier City Hotel & Casino	Bossier City, Louisiana, U.S.
3	LFA 3: Spann vs. Giles	February 10, 2017	Golden Nugget Hotel & Casino	Lake Charles, Louisiana, U.S.
2	LFA 2: Richman vs. Stojadinovic	January 20, 2017	Mystic Lake Casino Hotel	Prior Lake, Minnesota, U.S.
1	LFA 1: Peterson vs. Higo	January 13, 2017	The Bomb Factory	Dallas, Texas, U.S.

=== Event locations ===
The following cities have hosted a total of 200 LFA events as of

United States (total: 180)
- Prior Lake, Minnesota (21)
- Sioux Falls, South Dakota (18)
- Shawnee, Oklahoma (14)
- Dallas, Texas (13)
- Phoenix, Arizona (13)
- Park City, Kansas (10)
- Commerce, California (7)
- Niagara Falls, New York (6)
- Vail, Colorado (6)
- Belton, Texas (4)
- Broomfield, Colorado (4)
- Houston, Texas (4)
- Branson, Missouri (3)
- Cabazon, California (3)
- Chandler, Arizona (3)
- Costa Mesa, California (3)
- Hammond, Indiana (3)
- Oshkosh, Wisconsin (3)
- Santa Cruz, California (3)
- Albuquerque, New Mexico (2)
- Bossier City, Louisiana (2)
- Burbank, California (2)
- Denver, Colorado (2)
- Lake Charles, Louisiana (2)
- New Town, North Dakota (2)
- St. Louis, Missouri (2)
- West Valley City, Utah (2)
- Atlanta, Georgia
- Atlantic City, New Jersey
- Beaumont, Texas
- Charlotte, North Carolina
- Clive, Iowa
- El Paso, Texas (1)
- Fresno, California (1)
- Greenville, South Carolina (1)
- Kearney, Nebraska (1)
- Las Vegas, Nevada (1)
- Lemoore, California (1)
- Louisville, Kentucky (1)
- Madison, Wisconsin (1)
- Minneapolis, Minnesota (1)
- Newport News, Virginia (1)
- Owensboro, Kentucky (1)
- Pueblo, Colorado (1)
- Ralston, Nebraska (1)
- Riverside, California (1)
- Salamanca, New York (1)
- San Antonio, Texas (1)
- Sloan, Iowa (1)
- Visalia, California (1)

Brazil (total: 19)

- Cajamar (10)
- Rio de Janeiro (6)
- Caraguatatuba (2)
- Recife (1)

== Promotions ==
Legacy FC and Resurrection FA agreed to a co-promoted live event on May 8 that featured bouts with fighters from one organization battling the other. The event took place on May 8 and as part of the AXS TV FIGHTS franchise. The event was labeled AXS TV FIGHTS: RFA VS. Legacy Superfight. The main event featured a title bout as the Legacy FC and RFA flyweight champions fought for the AXS TV Super Fight title. In addition two Legacy FC fighters competed to crown a new lightweight champion, and the RFA bantamweight champion defended his title against a top RFA contender.

== Merger ==
In September 2016 it was announced that Legacy FC & RFA would merge to create a new Legacy Fighting Alliance promotion. LFA had its first event on January 13, 2017, with Legacy FC and RFA bantamweight titles unification as the main fight.

== Broadcasting ==
After about two and a half years of broadcasting Legacy Fighting Alliance, AXS TV was by owner Mark Cuban sold to Anthem Sports. Anthem disbanded the AXS TV Fights division. At UFC 244 it was announced UFC Fight Pass secured an exclusive on LFA broadcasts. On November 8, 2021, it was announced that the broadcasting deal with the UFC was renewed to last through 2025. On January 7, 2026, it was announced that the promotion has officially parted ways with UFC Fight Pass and signed a new broadcast deal with Vice TV.

== Current Champions ==
Division	Upper weight limit	Champion	Since	Title Defenses
Heavyweight	265 lb (120 kg)	(Russia) Arslan Bilalov	Jan 16, 2026	0
Light Heavyweight	205 lb (93 kg)	Vacant	Jul 2, 2026	--
Middleweight	185 lb (84 kg)	(United States) Jake Woodley	Oct 23, 2026	0
Welterweight	170 lb (77 kg)	(Brazil) João Paulo Silva	Nov 13, 2026	0
Lightweight	155 lb (70 kg)	(Russia) Ansar Khamzaev	Oct 30, 2026	0
Featherweight	145 lb (66 kg)	(Brazil) Erick Visconde	May 15, 2026	0
Bantamweight	135 lb (61 kg)	(Brazil) Rafael Pereira	Sep 11, 2026	0
Women's Bantamweight	135 lb (61 kg)	Vacant	Jul 31, 2025	–
Flyweight	125 lb (57 kg)	Vacant	Sep 22, 2026	--
Women's Flyweight	125 lb (57 kg)	Vacant	Feb 16, 2026	–
Women's Strawweight	115 lb (52 kg)	(Brazil) Natalia Alves	Nov 13, 2026	0

== Championship history ==
=== LFA Heavyweight Championship ===
Weight limit: 265 lb (120.2 kg)

No.	Name	Event	Date	Reign (total)	Defenses
1	(United States) Richard Odoms def. Jared Vanderaa	LFA 15; Shawnee, OK, U.S.	Jun 30, 2017	126 days	
2	(United States) Jeff Hughes	LFA 26; Houston, TX, U.S.	Nov 3, 2017	263 days	1. def. Maurice Greene at LFA 38 on Apr 27, 2018
Hughes vacated the title on July 24, 2018, after he was awarded a UFC contract.
3	(United States) Thomas Petersen def. Vernon Lewis	LFA 113; Belton, TX, U.S.	Jul 30, 2021	289 days	
4	(Dominican Republic) Waldo Cortes-Acosta	LFA 129; Prior Lake, MN, U.S.	Apr 15, 2022	109 days	
Cortes-Acosta vacated the title on August 2, 2022, after he awarded a UFC contract.
5	(Brazil) Eduardo Neves def. Hyago Silva	LFA 154; Cajamar, Brazil	Mar 10, 2023	238 days	
6	(Brazil) Hugo Cunha	LFA 171; Cajamar, Brazil	Nov 3, 2023	505 days	
7	(United States) Denzel Freeman	LFA 204; Mashantucket, CT, U.S.	Mar 22, 2025	187 days	
Freeman vacated the title on September 25, 2025 when he signed with the Ultimate Fighting Championship.
8	(Russia) Arslan Bilalov def. Matt Adams	LFA 224; Prior Lake, MN, U.S.	Jan 16, 2026	302 days (incumbent)	

=== LFA Light Heavyweight Championship ===
Weight limit: 205 lb (93.0 kg)

No.	Name	Event	Date	Reign (total)	Defenses
1	(United States) Ryan Spann def. Alex Nicholson	LFA 32; Lake Charles, LA, U.S.	Jan 26, 2018	144 days	
Spann vacated the title on June 19, 2018, after he was awarded a UFC contract at Dana White's Contender Series.
2	(Lithuania) Julius Anglickas def. Clayton York	LFA 60; Clive, IO, U.S.	Feb 15, 2019	224 days	
Anglickas vacated the title on October 7, 2019, when he signed with Bellator MMA.
3	(United States) Alex Polizzi def. Jamal Pogues	LFA 82; Prior Lake, MN, U.S.	Feb 21, 2020	8 days	
Polizzi vacated the title on February 29, 2020, when he signed with Bellator MMA.
4	(United States) Fabio Cherant def. Myron Dennis	LFA 99; Park City, KS, U.S.	Feb 12, 2021	40 days	
Cherant vacated the title on March 23, 2021, when he stepped in to face Alonzo Menifield at UFC 260.
5	(United States) Josh Silveira def. Tee Cummins	LFA 115; Oshkosh, WI, U.S.	Sep 24, 2021	115 days	
Silveira vacated the title on January 17, 2022, when he signed with the Professional Fighters League.
6	(Brazil) Bruno Lopes def. Willyanedson Paiva	LFA 143; Recife, Brazil	Sep 30, 2022	683 days	1. def. Marcos Brigagão at LFA 175 on Jan 27, 2024
-	(Brazil) Rodolfo Bellato def. Acácio dos Santos for interim title	LFA 159; Caraguatatuba, Brazil	May 27, 2023	–	
Bellato vacated the interim title on October 3, 2023, after he was awarded a UFC contract at Dana White's Contender Series.
-	(Kyrgyzstan) Uran Satybaldiev def. Bruno Assis for the interim title	LFA 178; Prior Lake, MN, U.S.	Mar 8, 2024	–	
Lopes vacated the title on August 13, 2024, after he was awarded a UFC contract at Dana White's Contender Series.
7	(Kyrgyzstan) Uran Satybaldiev promoted to undisputed champion	—	Aug 13, 2024	233 days	1. def. Leon Soares at LFA 203 on Mar 6, 2025
Satybaldiev vacated the title on April 3, 2025, when he stepped on short-notice against Martin Buday at UFC on ESPN 65.
8	(Brazil) Lucas Fernando def. Phillip Latu	LFA 214; Sioux Falls, SD, U.S.	Aug 15, 2025	321 days	1. def. Leon Soares at LFA 234 on May 29, 2026
Fernando vacated the title on July 2, 2026, when he signed with the Ultimate Fighting Championship.

=== LFA Middleweight Championship ===
Weight limit: 185 lb (83.9 kg)

No.	Name	Event	Date	Reign (total)	Defenses
1	(United States) Eryk Anders def. Brendan Allen	LFA 14; Houston, TX, U.S.	Jun 23, 2017	20 days	
Anders vacated the title on July 13, 2017 when he signed with the Ultimate Fighting Championship.
2	(Brazil) Markus Perez def. Ian Heinisch	LFA 22; Broomfield, CO, U.S.	Sep 8, 2017	55 days	
Perez vacated the title in November 2, 2017 when he signed with the Ultimate Fighting Championship.
3	(United States) Anthony Hernandez def. Brendan Allen	LFA 32; Lake Charles, LA, U.S.	Jan 26, 2018	144 days	
–	(United States) Ian Heinisch def. Gabriel Checco for interim title	LFA 39; Vail, CO, U.S.	May 4, 2018	–	
Hernandez vacated the title on June 19, 2018, after he was awarded a UFC contract at Dana White's Contender Series.
4	(United States) Ian Heinisch promoted to undisputed champion	—	Jun 19, 2018	42 days	
Heinisch vacated the title in July 31, 2018, after he was awarded a UFC contract at Dana White's Contender Series.
5	(United States) Brendan Allen def. Tim Hiley	LFA 50; Prior Lake, MN, U.S.	Sep 21, 2018	298 days	1. def. Moses Murrietta at LFA 61 on Feb 22, 2019
Allen vacated the title on July 16, 2019, after he was awarded a UFC contract at Dana White's Contender Series.
6	(Brazil) Gregory Rodrigues def. Josh Fremd	LFA 108; Sioux Falls, SD, U.S.	May 21, 2021	4 days	
Rodrigues vacated the title on May 25, 2021, when he signed with the Ultimate Fighting Championship.
7	(United States) Josh Silveira def. Jared Revel	LFA 119; Phoenix, AZ, U.S.	Dec 3, 2021	45 days	
Silveira vacated the title on January 17, 2022, when he signed with the Professional Fighters League.
8	(United States) Ozzy Diaz def. Bruno Assis	LFA 127; Commerce, CA, U.S.	Mar 25, 2022	123 days	
Diaz was vacating the title immediately after winning at LFA 127 and the promotion announced that he call-up to Dana White's Contender Series. The title was officially vacated on July 26, 2022.
9	(Brazil) Lucas Fernando def. Jansey Silva	LFA 154; Cajamar, Brazil	Mar 10, 2023	280 days	
–	(Russia) Azamat Bekoev def. Dylan Budka for interim title	LFA 160; Owensboro, KY, U.S.	Jun 16, 2023	–	
10	(Russia) Azamat Bekoev	LFA 173; Las Vegas, NV, U.S.	Dec 15, 2023	395 days	1. def. Chauncey Foxworth at LFA 186 on Jun 22, 2024
Bekoev vacated the title on January 13, 2025 when he signed with the Ultimate Fighting Championship.
11	(Ukraine) David Allakhverdiev def. John Moore	LFA 214; Sioux Falls, SD, U.S.	Aug 15, 2025	175 days	
12	(United States) Joseph Kropschot	LFA 226; Clarksville, TN, U.S.	Feb 6, 2026	186 days	
Kropschot vacated the title on August 11, 2026, after he was awarded a UFC contract at Dana White's Contender Series.
13	(United States) Jake Woodley def. Zayne Havener	LFA 244; Mashantucket, CT, U.S.	Oct 23, 2026	22 days (incumbent)	

=== LFA Welterweight Championship ===
Weight limit: 170 lb (77.1 kg)

No.	Name	Event	Date	Reign (total)	Defenses
1	(United States) Derrick Krantz def. Ben Neumann	LFA 12; Prior Lake, MN, U.S.	May 19, 2017	126 days	
2	(United States) James Nakashima	LFA 23; Bossier City, LA, U.S.	Sep 22, 2017	52 days	1. def. Kyle Stewart at LFA 46 on Jul 27, 2018
Nakashima vacated the title in November 13, 2018 when he signed with ONE Championship.
3	(Jamaica) Jason Jackson def. Hemerson Souza	LFA 71; Atlanta, GA, U.S.	Jul 12, 2019	42 days	
Jackson vacated the title in August 23, 2019, when he signed with Bellator MMA.
4	(United States) Jaleel Willis def. Vinicius de Jesus	LFA 88; Sioux Falls, SD, U.S.	Aug 21, 2020	30 days	
Willis vacated the title in September 20, 2020, when he signed with Bellator MMA.
5	(Brazil) Maycon Mendonça def. Batsumberel Dagvadorj	LFA 96; Park City, KS, U.S.	Dec 4, 2020	130 days	
Mendonça vacated the title on April 13, 2021 when he signed with Bellator MMA.
6	(Brazil) Carlos Leal def. Uyran Carlos	LFA 112; Rio de Janeiro, Brazil	July 18, 2021	190 days	
Leal vacated the title on January 24, 2022, when he signed with the Professional Fighters League.
7	(Brazil) Gabriel Bonfim def. Eduardo Garvon	LFA 126; Rio de Janeiro, Brazil	Mar 11, 2022	179 days	
Bonfim vacated the title in September 6, 2022, after he was awarded a UFC contract at Dana White's Contender Series.
8	(United States) Chris Brown def. Alfonso Leyva	LFA 148; Commerce, CA, U.S.	Dec 9, 2022	96 days	
Brown vacated the title on March 15, 2023, when he signed with the Professional Fighters League.
9	(United States) Trey Waters def. Jalin Fuller	LFA 156; Sioux Falls, SD, U.S.	Apr 14, 2023	9 days	
Waters vacated the title on April 23, 2023, after he stepped on a short-notice against Josh Quinlan at UFC on ESPN 45.
10	(Brazil) Geraldo Neto def. Magnus Conrado	LFA 166; Cajamar, Brazil	Sep 2, 2023	203 days	
–	(Russia) Shamidkhan Magomedov def. Devin Smyth for interim title	LFA 177; Niagara Falls, NY, U.S.	Feb 23, 2024	–	1. def. Alfonso Leyva at LFA 194 on Oct 18, 2024
11	(Brazil) Vanilto Antunes	LFA 179; Rio de Janeiro, Brazil	Mar 23, 2024	308 days	
12	(Russia) Shamidkhan Magomedov	LFA 200; Prior Lake, MN, U.S.	Jan 25, 2025	265 days	
Magomedov vacated the title on October 17, 2025, when he signed with UAE Warriors.
13	(United States) Jonathan Piersma def. Luis Francischinelli	LFA 223; Niagara Falls, NY, U.S.	Nov 21, 2025	181 days	
Piersma was stripped of the title on May 21, 2026, after failing to make weight for his title defense against Diego Bianchini at LFA 233.
14	(Brazil) João Paulo Silva def. Gabriel Vinicius	LFA 246; Cajamar, Brazil	Nov 13, 2026	1 day (incumbent)	

=== LFA Lightweight Championship ===
Weight limit: 155 lb (70.3 kg)

No.	Name	Event	Date	Reign (total)	Defenses
1	(United States) Robert Watley def. Thiago Moisés	LFA 17; Charlotte, NC, U.S.	Jul 21, 2017	269 days	1. def. Daryl Wilson at LFA 27 on Nov 10, 2017; 2. def. Brandon Jenkins at LFA 34 on Mar 2, 2018
Watley vacated the title on April 16, 2018, when he signed with the Professional Fighters League.
2	(United States) Austin Hubbard def. Killys Mota	LFA 56; Prior Lake, MN, U.S.	Dec 7, 2018	123 days	
Hubbard vacated the title on April 9, 2019, when he signed with the Ultimate Fighting Championship.
3	(United States) Harvey Park def. Demarques Jackson	LFA 64; Sioux Falls, SD, U.S.	Apr 26, 2019	? days	
Park vacated the title in March 2020, due to suffering an injury.
4	(United States) Bryce Logan def. Jacob Rosales	LFA 87; Sioux Falls, SD, U.S.	Jul 31, 2020	67 days	
Logan vacated the title in October 6, 2020, when he signed with Bellator MMA.
5	(United States) Nick Browne def. Arthur Estrázulas	LFA 97; Park City, KS, U.S.	Jan 15, 2021	111 days	
Browne vacated the title in May 6, 2021 when he signed with the Bellator MMA.
6	(United States) Aaron McKenzie def. Lucas Clay	LFA 128; Sioux Falls, SD, U.S.	Apr 8, 2022	330 days	
McKenzie vacated the title on March 4, 2023, when he joined the roster at The Ultimate Fighter: Team McGregor vs. Team Chandler.
7	(United States) JaCobi Jones def. Jean-Paul Lebosnoyani	LFA 158; Chandler, AZ, U.S.	May 19, 2023	237 days	
–	(Brazil) Jefferson Nascimento def. Gabriel Costa for interim title	LFA 171; Cajamar, Brazil	Nov 3, 2023	–	1. def. Baysangur Makaev at LFA 218 on Sep 27, 2025; 2. def. Gian Maurente at LFA 234 on May 29, 2026
Jones was stripped of the title on January 11, 2024, after failing to make weight for his title defense against Kegan Gennrich at LFA 174.
8	(United States) Kegan Gennrich def. JaCobi Jones	LFA 174; Prior Lake, MN, U.S.	Jan 12, 2024	147 days	
9	(United States) Richie Lewis	LFA 185; Hammond, IN, U.S.	Jun 7, 2024	315 days	
10	(United States) Richie Miranda	LFA 207; Sioux Falls, SD, U.S.	Apr 18, 2025	467 days	1. def. Ilay Barzilay at LFA 215 on Aug 22, 2025; 2. def. Robert Varricchio at LFA 233 on May 22, 2026
Nascimento vacated the interim title on June 18, 2026, when he signed with the Ultimate Fighting Championship.
Miranda vacated the title on July 29, 2026, when he signed with the Ultimate Fighting Championship.
11	(Russia) Ansar Khamzaev def. Juliano Prescendo	LFA 245; Niagara Falls, NY, U.S.	Oct 30, 2026	15 days (incumbent)	

=== LFA Featherweight Championship ===
Weight limit: 145 lb (65.8 kg)

No.	Name	Event	Date	Reign (total)	Defenses
1	(United States) Kevin Aguilar def. Damon Jackson	LFA 4 Bossier City, LA, U.S.	Feb 17, 2017	638 days	1. def. Justin Rader at LFA 18 on Aug 4, 2017; 2. def. interim champion Thanh Le at LFA 40 on May 25, 2018
–	(United States) Thanh Le def. Bobby Moffett for interim title	LFA 31; Phoenix, AZ, U.S.	Jan 19, 2018	–	
–	(United States) Damon Jackson def. Nate Jennerman for interim title	LFA 47; Dallas, TX, U.S.	Aug 10, 2018	–	
Aguilar vacated the title in November 17, 2018, when he signed with the Ultimate Fighting Championship.
2	(United States) Damon Jackson promoted to undisputed champion	—	Nov 30, 2018	122 days	
Jackson vacated the title in April 1, 2019, when he signed with the Professional Fighters League.
3	(United States) Justin Gonzales def. Jake Childers	LFA 84; Sioux Falls, SD, U.S.	Jul 10, 2020	62 days	
Gonzales vacated the title in September 10, 2020, when he signed with Bellator MMA.
4	(Brazil) Bruno Souza def. Javier Garcia	LFA 114; St. Louis, MO, U.S.	Aug 27, 2021	64 days	
Souza vacated the title in October 30, 2021, when he signed with the Ultimate Fighting Championship.
5	(Brazil) Gabriel Santos def. José Mauro Delano	LFA 151; Cajamar, Brazil	Jan 28, 2023	41 days	
Santos vacated the title on March 10, 2023, when he signed with the Ultimate Fighting Championship.
Javier Garcia won the vacant title against Elijah Johns at LFA 163 on July 21, 2023, but was stripped after his win was overturned to a no-contest due to a failed pre-fight drug test.
6	(United States) Elijah Johns def. Alfred Walker	LFA 176; Phoenix, AZ, U.S.	Feb 9, 2024	351 days	
–	(Brazil) Lerryan Douglas def. Javier Reyes for interim title	LFA 190; Commerce, CA, U.S.	Aug 23, 2024	–	
7	(Brazil) Lerryan Douglas	LFA 200; Prior Lake, MN, U.S.	Jan 25, 2025	227 days	
Douglas vacated the title on September 9, 2025, after he was awarded a UFC contract at Dana White's Contender Series.
8	(Brazil) Erick Visconde def. Gustavo Pintos	LFA 232; Mashantucket, CT, U.S.	May 15, 2026	183 days (incumbent)	

=== LFA Bantamweight Championship ===
Weight limit: 135 lb (61.2 kg)

No.	Name	Event	Date	Reign (total)	Defenses
1	(Brazil) Leandro Higo def. Steven Peterson	LFA 1 Dallas, TX, U.S.	Jan 13, 2017	41 days	
Higo vacated the title on February 23, 2017, when he signed with Bellator MMA.
2	(United States) Ricky Simón def. Chico Camus	LFA 29; Prior Lake, MN, U.S.	Dec 15, 2017	98 days	1. def. Vinicius Zani at LFA 36 on Mar 23, 2018
Simón vacated the title on March 23, 2018, when he signed with the Ultimate Fighting Championship.
3	(United States) Miles Johns def. Adrian Yanez	LFA 55; Dallas, TX, U.S.	Nov 30, 2018	207 days	
–	(United States) Casey Kenney def. Vincent Cachero for interim title	LFA 62; Dallas, TX, U.S.	Mar 22, 2019	–	
Kenney vacated the interim title on March 25, 2019, after he stepped on short-notice with Ray Borg at UFC on ESPN: Barboza vs. Gaethje.
Johns vacated the title on June 25, 2019 after he awarded a UFC contract at Dana White's Contender Series.
4	(Georgia (country)) Zviad Lazishvili def. Ricky Steele	LFA 90; Sioux Falls, SD, U.S.	Sep 4, 2020	353 days	
Lazishvili vacated the title on August 23, 2021 when he signed with the Ultimate Fighting Championship.
5	(United States) Richard Palencia def. Allan Begosso	LFA 119; Phoenix, AZ, U.S.	Dec 3, 2021	33 days	
Palencia vacated the title on January 5, 2022 when he signed with Bellator MMA.
6	(United States) Daniel Argueta def. Diego Silva	LFA 131; Oshkosh, WI, U.S.	May 6, 2022	19 days	
Argueta vacated the title on May 25, 2022, when he signed with the Ultimate Fighting Championship.
7	(Tajikistan) Muin Gafurov def. Diego Silva	LFA 144; Sioux Falls, SD, U.S.	Oct 14, 2022	222 days	
–	(United States) Jerrell Hodge def. Rafael do Nascimento for interim title	LFA 155; Niagara Falls, NY, U.S.	Mar 24, 2023	–	
Hodge vacated the interim title on April 15, 2023, when he signed with Bellator MMA.
Gafurov vacated the title in May 24, 2023 when he signed with Ultimate Fighting Championship.
8	(United States) John Sweeney def. Allan Begosso	LFA 160; Owensboro, KY, U.S.	Jun 16, 2023	391 days	
Sweeney was stripped of the title on July 11, 2024, after failing to make weight for his title defense against Rafael do Nascimento at LFA 188.
9	(Brazil) Vinicius Pires def. Lionel Abojer	LFA 205; Brasília, Brazil	Mar 28, 2025	231 days	
10	(Russia) Artem Belakh	LFA 222; Mashantucket, CT, U.S.	Nov 14, 2025	278 days	
The title was officially vacated on August 19, 2026, after Belakh relinquished his title to compete at The Ultimate Fighter: Team Cormier vs. Team Bisping.
11	(Brazil) Rafael Pereira def. Vinicius Pires	LFA 241; Belo Horizonte, Brazil	Sep 11, 2026	64 days (incumbent)	

=== LFA Flyweight Championship ===
Weight limit: 125 lb (56.7 kg)

No.	Name	Event	Date	Reign (total)	Defenses
1	(United States) Roberto Sanchez def. Jerome Rivera	LFA 14; Houston, TX, U.S.	Jun 23, 2017	17 days	
Sanchez vacated the title on July 10, 2017 when he signed with the Ultimate Fighting Championship.
2	(Cuba) Maikel Pérez def. Sid Bice	LFA 37; Sioux Falls, SD, U.S.	Apr 20, 2018	413 days	
–	(United States) Casey Kenney def. Brandon Royval for interim title	LFA 53; Phoenix, AZ, U.S.	Nov 9, 2018	–	
Kenney vacated the interim title on March 25, 2019, after he stepped on short-notice with Ray Borg at UFC on ESPN: Barboza vs. Gaethje.
3	(Mexico) Brandon Moreno	LFA 69; Cabazon, CA, U.S.	Jun 7, 2019	34 days	
Moreno vacated the title in July 11, 2019, when he re-signed with the Ultimate Fighting Championship.
4	(United States) Brandon Royval def. Nate Williams	LFA 79; Broomfield, CO, U.S.	Nov 22, 2019	181 days	
Royval vacated the title in May 21, 2020, when he signed with the Ultimate Fighting Championship.
5	(United States) Jimmy Flick def. Greg Fischer	LFA 86; Sioux Falls, SD, U.S.	Jul 24, 2020	39 days	
Flick vacated the title on September 1, 2020, after he awarded a UFC contract at Dana White's Contender Series.
6	(Mexico) Victor Altamirano def. Nate Smith	LFA 100; Park City, KS, U.S.	Feb 19, 2021	193 days	
–	(United States) Charles Johnson def. Yuma Horiuchi for interim title	LFA 110; Shawnee, OK, U.S.	Jul 2, 2021	–	1. def. João Camilo at LFA 114 on Aug 27, 2021
Altamirano vacated the title on August 31, 2021, after he awarded a UFC contract at Dana White's Contender Series.
7	(United States) Charles Johnson promoted to undisputed champion	—	Aug 31, 2021	233 days	1. def. Carlos Mota at LFA 122 on Jan 21, 2022
Johnson vacated the title on April 21, 2022, when he signed with the Ultimate Fighting Championship.
8	(Brazil) Carlos Mota def. Rizvan Abuev	LFA 140; New Town, ND, U.S.	Aug 26, 2022	59 days	
Mota vacated the title in October 24, 2022 when he stepped in on short-notice against Cody Durden at UFC Fight Night: Kattar vs. Allen.
9	(Brazil) Felipe Bunes def. Yuma Horiuchi	LFA 149; Chandler, AZ, U.S.	Jan 6, 2023	132 days	
Bunes vacated the title in May 18, 2023 when he signed with the Ultimate Fighting Championship.
10	(United States) Cody Davis def. Igor Siqueira	LFA 161; Commerce, CA, U.S.	Jun 23, 2023	147 days	
11	(Brazil) Eduardo Henrique	LFA 172; Phoenix, AZ, U.S.	Nov 17, 2023	999 days	1. def. interim champion Igor Siqueira at LFA 190 on Aug 23, 2024; 2. def. Devon Lozej at LFA 215 on Aug 22, 2025
–	(Brazil) Igor Siqueira def. Eimar Hernandez for interim title	LFA 181; Prior Lake, MN, U.S.	Apr 5, 2024	–	
–	(Brazil) Marcos Degli def. Lincon Santos for interim title	LFA 201; Cajamar, Brazil	Feb 7, 2025	551 days	1. def. Matheus Severino at LFA 212 on Jul 11, 2025; 2. def. Luís Aguiar at LFA 225 on Jan 23, 2026
Henrique vacated the title on August 12, 2026 when he signed with the Ultimate Fighting Championship.
12	(Brazil) Marcos Degli promoted to undisputed champion	—	Aug 12, 2026	41 days	
Degli vacated the title on September 22, 2026, after he was awarded a UFC contract at Dana White's Contender Series.

=== LFA Women's Bantamweight Championship ===
Weight limit: 135 lb (61.2 kg)

No.	Name	Event	Date	Reign (total)	Defenses
1	(United States) Sarah Alpar def. Joselyne Edwards	LFA 55; Dallas, TX, U.S.	Nov 30, 2018	256 days	
Alpar vacated the title on August 13, 2019, after she awarded a UFC contract at Dana White's Contender Series.
2	(Portugal) Jacqueline Cavalcanti def. Melissa Croden	LFA 157; Prior Lake, MN, U.S.	Apr 21, 2023	47 days	
Cavalcanti vacated the title on June 7, 2023, when she signed with the Ultimate Fighting Championship.
3	(Brazil) Beatriz Mesquita def. Sierra Dinwoodie	LFA 211; Salamanca, NY, U.S.	Jun 20, 2025	41 days	
Mesquita vacated the title on July 31, 2025, when she signed with the Ultimate Fighting Championship.

=== LFA Women's Flyweight Championship ===
Weight limit: 125 lb (56.7 kg)

No.	Name	Event	Date	Reign (total)	Defenses
1	(United States) Andrea Lee def. Heather Bassett	LFA 4 Bossier City, LA, U.S.	Feb 17, 2017	224 days	1. def. Jamie Thorton at LFA 23 on Sep 22, 2017
Lee vacated the title on September 29, 2017, when she signed with the Ultimate Fighting Championship.
2	(Colombia) Sabina Mazo def. Shannon Sinn	LFA 37; Sioux Falls, SD, U.S.	Apr 20, 2018	239 days	1. def. Caroline Yariwaki at LFA 54 on Nov 16, 2018
Mazo vacated the title on December 15, 2018 when she signed with the Ultimate Fighting Championship.
3	(Canada) Jamey-Lyn Horth def. Mayra Cantuária	LFA 120; Prior Lake, MN, U.S.	Dec 10, 2021	469 days	
–	(Brazil) Gabriella Fernandes def. Karoline Martins for interim title	LFA 143; Recife, Brazil	Sep 30, 2022	–	
Fernandes vacated the interim title on October 21, 2022, when she signed with the Ultimate Fighting Championship.
Horth vacated the title on March 24, 2023, when she signed with the Ultimate Fighting Championship.
4	(Colombia) Sabina Mazo (2) def. Sandra Lavado	LFA 164; El Paso, TX, U.S.	Aug 4, 2023	? days	
Mazo vacated the title in 2023, when she move up to bantamweight.
5	(Canada) Shannon Clark def. Thaiany Lopes	LFA 177; Niagara Falls, NY, U.S.	Feb 23, 2024	724 days	1. def. interim champion Cheyanne Bowers at LFA 200 on Jan 25, 2025; 2. def. Beatriz Consuli at LFA 221 on Nov 7, 2025
–	(United States) Cheyanne Bowers def. Veronika Borisova for interim title	LFA 193; Prior Lake, MN, U.S.	Sep 20, 2024	–	
Clark vacated the title on February 16, 2026, when she signed with the Professional Fighters League.

=== LFA Women's Strawweight Championship ===
Weight limit: 115 lb (52.2 kg)

No.	Name	Event	Date	Reign (total)	Defenses
1	(United States) Vanessa Demopoulos def. Sam Hughes	LFA 85; Sioux Falls, SD, U.S.	Jul 17, 2020	105 days	
2	(Mexico) Lupita Godinez	LFA 94; Park City, KS, U.S.	Oct 30, 2020	153 days	
Godinez vacated the title on April 1, 2021, when she signed with the Ultimate Fighting Championship.
3	(Venezuela) Piera Rodríguez def. Svetlana Gotsyk	LFA 105; Shawnee, OK, U.S.	Apr 23, 2021	179 days	
Rodriguez vacated the title on October 19, 2021, after she awarded a UFC contract at Dana White's Contender Series.
4	(Brazil) Jaqueline Amorim def. Loveth Young	LFA 125; Niagara Falls, NY, U.S.	Feb 25, 2022	208 days	1. def. Ashley Nichols at LFA 142 on Sep 16, 2022
Amorim vacated the title on September 21, 2022 when she signed with the Ultimate Fighting Championship.
5	(Brazil) Julia Polastri def. Brenda Gottig	LFA 151; Cajamar, Brazil	Jan 28, 2023	227 days	
–	(Brazil) Rose Conceição def. Elaine Lopes for interim title	LFA 162; Cajamar, Brazil	Jul 7, 2023	–	
Polastri vacated the title in September 12, 2023, after she awarded a UFC contract at Dana White's Contender Series.
6	(Brazil) Rose Conceição promoted to undisputed champion	—	Sep 12, 2023	514 days	
–	(Russia) Natalia Kuziutina def. Giovanna Canuto for interim title	LFA 173; Las Vegas, NV, U.S.	Dec 15, 2023	–	1. def. Bruna Ellen at LFA 189 on Aug 2, 2024; 2. def. Yasmin Guimarães at LFA 197 on Nov 22, 2024
Kuziutina vacated the interim title on January 3, 2025, when she signed with the Global Fight League.
7	(Brazil) Edilania da Silva	LFA 201; Cajamar, Brazil	Feb 7, 2025	210 days	
8	(Brazil) Aieza Ramos Bertolso	LFA 216; Cuiabá, Brazil	Sep 5, 2025	389 days	
Bertolso vacated the title on September 29, 2026, after he was awarded a UFC contract at Dana White's Contender Series.
9	(Brazil) Natália Alves def. Raiane Vinuto	LFA 246; Cajamar, Brazil	Nov 13, 2026	1 day (incumbent)	
