= Cajamar, São Paulo =

Municipality in the state of São Paulo in Brazil

Cajamar
- Municipality
- The Municipality of Cajamar
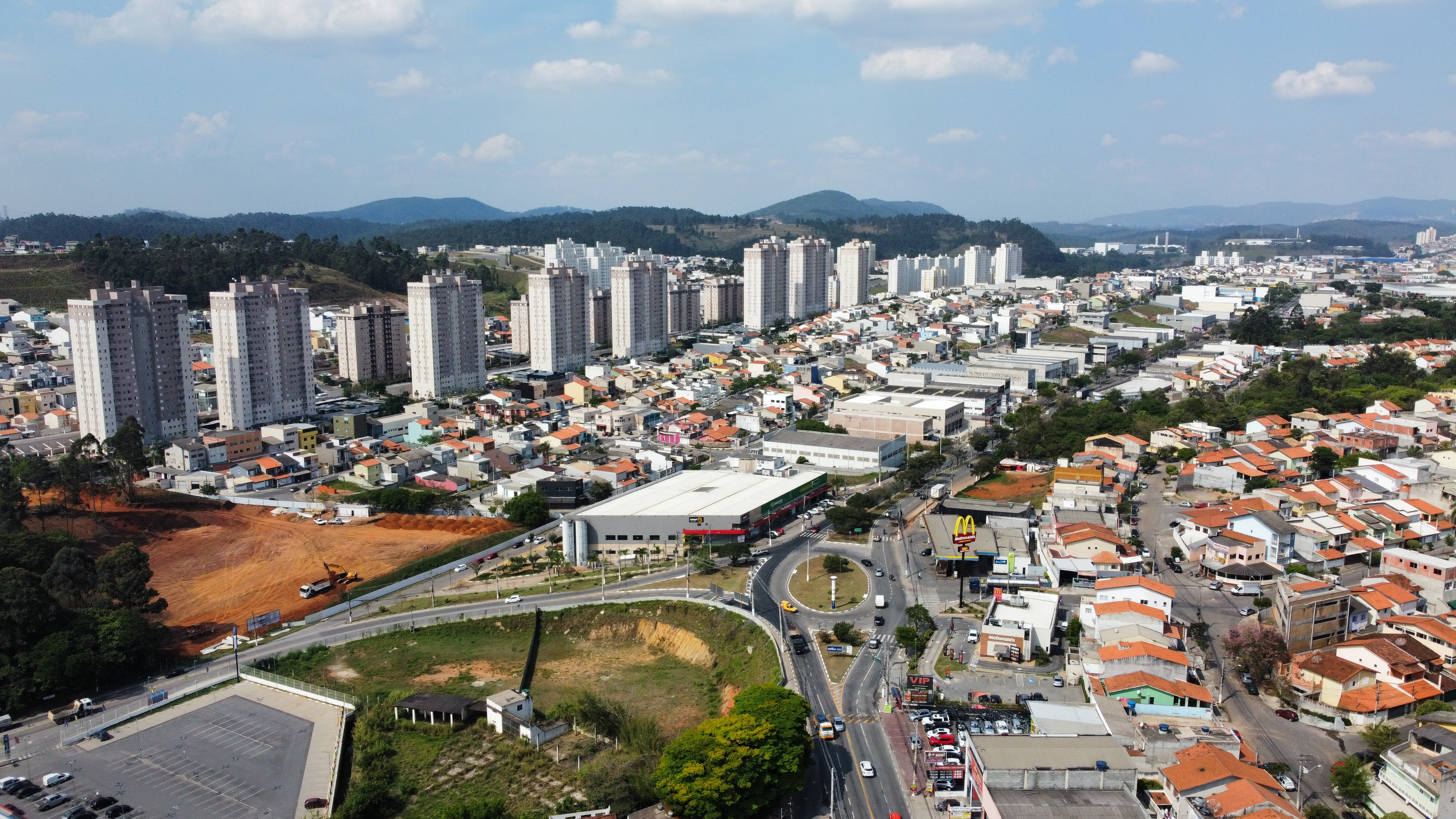
- .

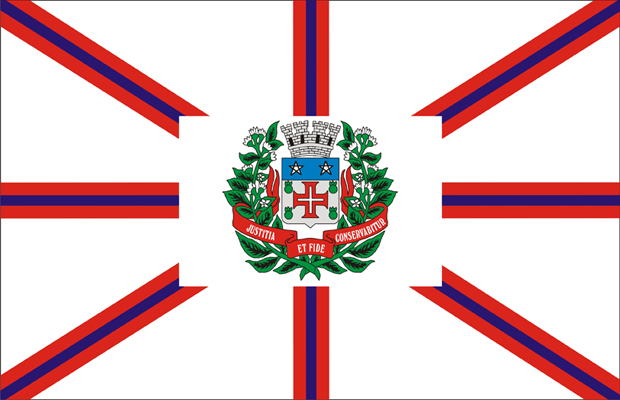
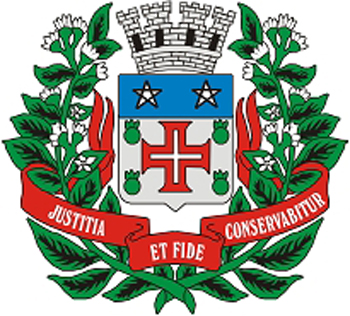
- Flag Coat of arms
- Motto: "Justitia et fide conservabitur" (Latin) "It shall be preserved by justice and faith"
- Location in Brazil
- Coordinates: 23°33′01″S 46°38′02″W
- Country: Brazil
- Region: Southeast
- State: São Paulo
- Metropolitan Region: São Paulo
- Founded: February 18, 1959

Government
  - Mayor: Danilo Joan (PSD)

Area
  - Total: 131.39 km^{2} (50.73 sq mi)
- Elevation: 760 m (2,490 ft)

Population (2020)
  - Total: 77,934
  - Density: 593.15/km^{2} (1,536.3/sq mi)
- Time zone: UTC−3 (BRT)
- HDI (2000): 0.786 – medium
- Website: City of Cajamar

Cajamar is a municipality in the State of São Paulo, Brazil. It is part of the Metropolitan Region of São Paulo. The population is 77,934 (2020 est.) in an area of 131.39 km^{2} (50.73 sq mi). It is bordered by Jundiaí to the north, Franco da Rocha and Caieiras to the east, the capital of the southeast, Santana do Parnaíba and Pirapora do Bom Jesus in the west.

It became a municipality in 1959, when emancipated from Santana do Parnaíba. In the district headquarters, in the city are also the districts of Jordanésia and Polvilho.

Cajamar has become a center of logistics in Brazil, Prologis Recently opened Prologis Cajamar II Cajamar is located at an average altitude of 760 meters.

The climate of the city, and across the metropolitan area of São Paulo, is subtropical. The average annual temperature is around 20 °C, with the coldest month being July (average 15 °C) and the warmest in February (average of 23 °C). The annual rainfall is around 1300 mm.

== Demography ==
=== Demographics ===
Historical population (municipality)
Year	Population	%±
1960	6,438	—
1970	10,355	60.8%
1980	21,942	111.9%
1991	33,736	53.8%
2000	50,761	50.5%
2010	64,114	26.3%
2022	92,689	44.6%

== Media ==
In telecommunications, the city was served by Telecomunicações de São Paulo. In July 1998, this company was acquired by Telefónica, which adopted the Vivo brand in 2012. The company is currently an operator of cell phones, fixed lines, internet (fiber optics/4G) and television (satellite and cable).

== See also ==
- List of municipalities in São Paulo
