= UFC Fight Night: Vieira vs. Tate =

2021 MMA event

- The poster for UFC Fight Night: Vieira vs. Tate
- Promotion: Ultimate Fighting Championship
- Date: November 20, 2021
- Venue: UFC Apex
- City: Enterprise, Nevada, United States
- Attendance: Not announced

Event chronology
UFC Fight Night: Holloway vs. Rodríguez	UFC Fight Night: Vieira vs. Tate	UFC on ESPN: Font vs. Aldo

UFC Fight Night: Vieira vs. Tate (also known as UFC Fight Night 198, UFC on ESPN+ 56, and UFC Vegas 43) was a mixed martial arts event produced by the Ultimate Fighting Championship that took place on November 20, 2021 at the UFC Apex facility in Enterprise, Nevada, part of the Las Vegas Metropolitan Area, United States.

== Background ==
A women's bantamweight bout between Ketlen Vieira and former Strikeforce and UFC Women's Bantamweight Champion Miesha Tate headlined the event. The pairing was originally expected to take place at UFC Fight Night: Ladd vs. Dumont, but it was pulled from the card when Tate tested positive for COVID-19.

A bantamweight bout between Rani Yahya and Kyung Ho Kang took place at this event. They were originally scheduled to meet at UFC on ESPN: Hall vs. Strickland, but Yahya tested positive for COVID-19 and the pairing was postponed.

A women's flyweight bout between Joanne Wood and Alexa Grasso was scheduled for the event. However, Grasso was forced to pull out from the event due to injury and was replaced by Taila Santos.

A featherweight bout between Gavin Tucker and Pat Sabatini was scheduled for the event. However, Tucker had to pull out of the bout in late October and was replaced by Tucker Lutz.

A women's strawweight bout between former Invicta FC Atomweight Champion and UFC Women's Strawweight Championship challenger Jessica Penne and Luana Pinheiro was expected to take place at the event. However, Penne withdrew from the bout due to undisclosed reasons and was replaced by Sam Hughes.

A women's strawweight bout between Loma Lookboonmee and Cheyanne Buys was scheduled for the event. However, Buys withdrew from the bout due to undisclosed reasons and was replaced by Lupita Godinez.

A flyweight bout between Malcolm Gordon and Denys Bondar was scheduled for this event. However, Gordon withdrew from the event due to undisclosed reason and the pairing was rescheduled for UFC Fight Night 201.

A light heavyweight bout between Marcin Prachnio and Azamat Murzakanov was scheduled for this event. However, due to visa issues, the bout was scrapped.

A heavyweight bout between Augusto Sakai and Tai Tuivasa was scheduled for this event. However, the pairing was scrapped due to visa issues and it is now expected to take place at UFC 269.

A lightweight bout between Farès Ziam and Terrance McKinney was scheduled for this event. However, it was scrapped a few hours before taking place due to one of McKinney's cornermen testing positive for COVID-19.

== Results ==
Main card (ESPN+)
Weight class				Method	Round	Time	Notes
Women's Bantamweight	Ketlen Vieira	def.	Miesha Tate	Decision (unanimous) (48–47, 48–47, 49–46)	5	5:00
Welterweight	Sean Brady	def.	Michael Chiesa	Decision (unanimous) (29–28, 29–28, 29–28)	3	5:00
Women's Flyweight	Taila Santos	def.	Joanne Wood	Submission (rear-naked choke)	1	4:49
Bantamweight	Rani Yahya	def.	Kang Kyung-ho	Decision (unanimous) (29–28, 29–28, 29–28)	3	5:00
Bantamweight	Adrian Yañez	def.	Davey Grant	Decision (split) (27–30, 29–28, 29–28)	3	5:00
Preliminary card (ESPN+)
Featherweight	Pat Sabatini	def.	Tucker Lutz	Decision (unanimous) (30–26, 30–27, 30–27)	3	5:00
Lightweight	Rafa García	def.	Natan Levy	Decision (unanimous) (29–28, 29–28, 29–28)	3	5:00
Women's Strawweight	Lupita Godinez	def.	Loma Lookboonmee	Decision (unanimous) (30–27, 30–27, 30–27)	3	5:00
Flyweight	Cody Durden	def.	Aori Qileng	Decision (unanimous) (29–28, 29–28, 29–28)	3	5:00
Featherweight	Shayilan Nuerdanbieke	def.	Sean Soriano	Decision (unanimous) (29–28, 29–28, 29–28)	3	5:00
Women's Strawweight	Luana Pinheiro	def.	Sam Hughes	Decision (unanimous) (30–27, 30–27, 29–28)	3	5:00

== Bonus awards ==
The following fighters received $50,000 bonuses.

- Fight of the Night: Adrian Yañez vs. Davey Grant
- Performance of the Night: Taila Santos

== See also ==
- List of UFC events
- List of current UFC fighters
- 2021 in UFC
