= Joanderson Brito =

Brazilian mixed martial artist (born 1995)

- Born: Joanderson Sá Brito; February 15, 1995 (age 31); Santa Helena, Maranhão, Brazil
- Other names: Tubarão
- Height: 5 ft 8 in (1.73 m)
- Weight: 145.5 lb (66 kg; 10 st 6 lb)
- Division: Bantamweight; Featherweight; Lightweight
- Reach: 72 in (183 cm)
- Fighting out of: Bauru, Brazil
- Team: Chute Boxe João Emilio
- Years active: 2013–present

Mixed martial arts record
- Total: 26
- Wins: 20
- By knockout: 9
- By submission: 8
- By decision: 3
- Losses: 5
- By knockout: 1
- By submission: 1
- By decision: 3
- Draws: 1

Other information
- Mixed martial arts record from Sherdog

Joanderson Sá Brito (born February 15, 1995) is a Brazilian mixed martial artist. He currently competes in the Featherweight division of the Ultimate Fighting Championship (UFC). As of November 7, 2026, he is #11 in the Meta UFC featherweight rankings.

== Background ==
Brito was born in Santa Helena, Maranhão, Brazil. As a child, he lived with his aunt whom he described as his "adoptive mother". At the age of 16, he spent his school holidays at his biological mother's house in Laranjal do Jari, and stayed there. Brito thought about joining the Army, but did not get to serve, because he already knew that he wanted to fight.

== Mixed martial arts career ==
=== Early career ===
Brito turned professional in 2013 and amassed a record of 11–2–1 in the Brazilian regional scene before moving into his fight at Dana White's Contender Series.

=== Dana White's Contender Series ===
Brito was invited to face Diego Lopes at Dana White's Contender Series 37 on 31 August 2021. The bout was ended in round three due to an eye poke which rendered Lopes unable to continue, the bout did go to the scorecards and Brito won by technical decision. Brito was awarded a UFC contract.

=== Ultimate Fighting Championship ===
In his UFC debut, Brito faced Bill Algeo on January 15, 2022, at UFC on ESPN 32. He lost the fight via unanimous decision.

Brito faced Andre Fili on April 30, 2022, at UFC on ESPN 35. He won the fight via technical knockout in round one. This fight earned him his first Performance of the Night award.

Brito was scheduled to face Melsik Baghdasaryan on October 15, 2022, at UFC Fight Night 212, but Baghdasaryan pulled out in late September due to a broken hand and was replaced by Lucas Alexander. He won the fight via a rear-naked choke in round one.

Brito was scheduled to face Khusein Askhabov on July 1, 2023, at UFC on ESPN 48. However, Askhabov withdrew for unknown reasons and was replaced by Westin Wilson. He won the fight via knockout in round one.

Brito faced Jonathan Pearce on November 18, 2023, at UFC Fight Night 232. He won the fight via a ninja choke in round two. This fight earned him another Performance of the Night award.

Brito faced Jack Shore on May 4, 2024, at UFC 301. He won the fight by technical knockout as a result of a doctor stoppage.

Brito was scheduled to face Dan Ige on July 20, 2024, at UFC on ESPN 60. However, Brito was forced to pull out from the event due to a leg injury.

Brito faced William Gomis on September 28, 2024, at UFC Fight Night 243. He lost the fight via split decision. 10 out of 13 media outlets scored the bout for Brito.

Brito faced Pat Sabatini on April 5, 2025, at UFC on ESPN 65. He lost the fight via unanimous decision.

Brito was scheduled to face Melsik Baghdasaryan on December 13, 2025, at UFC on ESPN 73. However, Baghdasaryan withdrew from the bout for undisclosed reasons and was replaced by promotional newcomer Isaac Thomson. He won the fight via unanimous decision.

Brito was scheduled to face Jordan Leavitt on May 16, 2026, at UFC Fight Night 276. However, for undisclosed reasons, the bout was moved to UFC Fight Night 278 on June 6, 2026. He won the fight via a ninja choke in round one.

Brito faced Giga Chikadze on September 19, 2026 at UFC 331. He won the fight by knockout in the first round.

Brito is scheduled to face Kaan Ofli on February 7, 2027 at UFC Fight Night 298.

== Championships and accomplishments ==
- Ultimate Fighting Championship
  - Performance of the Night (Two time) vs. Andre Fili and Jonathan Pearce
  - Tied (Ricardo Lamas & Brian Ortega) for third most finishes in UFC Featherweight division history (7)
  - Second highest takedown accuracy percentage in UFC Featherweight division history (66.7%)
- Fusion Fighting Championship (FFC)
  - Fusion FC Lightweight Championship (One time)
    - One successful title defense
- Araça Fight Combat
  - Araça Fight Featherweight Championship (One time)

== Mixed martial arts record ==
Professional record breakdown
| 26 matches | 20 wins | 5 losses |
| By knockout | 9 | 1 |
| By submission | 8 | 1 |
| By decision | 3 | 3 |
| Draws | 1 | |

| Res. | Record | Opponent | Method | Event | Date | Round | Time | Location | Notes |
|---|---|---|---|---|---|---|---|---|---|
| Win | 20–5–1 | Giga Chikadze | KO (punches) | UFC 331 | September 19, 2026 | 1 | 1:57 | Los Angeles, California, United States | |
| Win | 19–5–1 | Jordan Leavitt | Submission (ninja choke) | UFC Fight Night: Muhammad vs. Bonfim | June 6, 2026 | 1 | 4:19 | Las Vegas, Nevada, United States | |
| Win | 18–5–1 | Isaac Thomson | Decision (unanimous) | UFC on ESPN: Royval vs. Kape | December 13, 2025 | 3 | 5:00 | Las Vegas, Nevada, United States | |
| Loss | 17–5–1 | Pat Sabatini | Decision (unanimous) | UFC on ESPN: Emmett vs. Murphy | April 5, 2025 | 3 | 5:00 | Las Vegas, Nevada, United States | |
| Loss | 17–4–1 | William Gomis | Decision (split) | UFC Fight Night: Moicano vs. Saint Denis | September 28, 2024 | 3 | 5:00 | Paris, France | |
| Win | 17–3–1 | Jack Shore | TKO (doctor stoppage) | UFC 301 | May 4, 2024 | 2 | 3:35 | Rio de Janeiro, Brazil | |
| Win | 16–3–1 | Jonathan Pearce | Submission (ninja choke) | UFC Fight Night: Allen vs. Craig | November 18, 2023 | 2 | 3:54 | Las Vegas, Nevada, United States | Performance of the Night. |
| Win | 15–3–1 | Westin Wilson | KO (punches) | UFC on ESPN: Strickland vs. Magomedov | April 22, 2023 | 1 | 2:54 | Las Vegas, Nevada, United States | |
| Win | 14–3–1 | Lucas Alexander | Submission (rear-naked choke) | UFC Fight Night: Grasso vs. Araújo | October 15, 2022 | 1 | 2:02 | Las Vegas, Nevada, United States | |
| Win | 13–3–1 | Andre Fili | TKO (punches) | UFC on ESPN: Font vs. Vera | April 30, 2022 | 1 | 0:41 | Las Vegas, Nevada, United States | Performance of the Night. |
| Loss | 12–3–1 | Bill Algeo | Decision (unanimous) | UFC on ESPN: Kattar vs. Chikadze | January 15, 2022 | 3 | 5:00 | Las Vegas, Nevada, United States | |
| Win | 12–2–1 | Diego Lopes | Technical Decision (unanimous) | Dana White's Contender Series 37 | August 31, 2021 | 3 | 0:10 | Las Vegas, Nevada, United States | Brito was deducted one point in round 3 due to an eye poke which rendered Lopes unable to continue. |
| Win | 11–2–1 | Chepe Mariscal | KO (punches) | LFA 65 | May 3, 2019 | 1 | 0:44 | Vail, Colorado, United States | |
| Win | 10–2–1 | Estabili Amato | Submission (guillotine choke) | Future FC 2 | February 22, 2019 | 2 | 0:41 | Indaiatuba, Brazil | Return to Featherweight. |
| Win | 9–2–1 | Jose Zarauz | Decision (unanimous) | Fusion FC 35 | November 7, 2018 | 3 | 5:00 | Santiago de Surco, Peru | Defended the Fusion FC Lightweight Championship. |
| Win | 8–2–1 | Wellington Prado | Submission (rear-naked choke) | Thunder Fight 15 | September 7, 2018 | 2 | 4:00 | São Paulo, Brazil | |
| Win | 7–2–1 | Johnny Iwasaki | TKO (punches) | Fusion FC 33 | July 18, 2018 | 3 | 4:25 | Santiago de Surco, Peru | Return to Lightweight. Won the vacant Fusion FC Lightweight Championship. |
| Win | 6–2–1 | Duílio Aparecido Bueno | Submission (rear-naked choke) | Strike do Vale Fight 2 | June 9, 2018 | 1 | 1:01 | Avaré, Brazil | |
| Win | 5–2–1 | Cicero Coutinho | TKO (punches) | Thunder Fight 13 | December 22, 2017 | 1 | 1:25 | São Paulo, Brazil | |
| Win | 4–2–1 | Leandro Compri | KO (punch) | Araça Fight 2017 | May 26, 2017 | 1 | 0:33 | Araçariguama, Brazil | Return to Featherweight. Won the vacant Araça Fight Featherweight Championship. |
| Win | 3–2–1 | Wanderley Junior | Submission (guillotine choke) | Ultimate Reborn Fight 5 | March 10, 2017 | 1 | 1:42 | São Paulo, Brazil | |
| Draw | 2–2–1 | Jefson Castor | Draw (unanimous) | Arena Kombat FC 2 | June 4, 2016 | 3 | 5:00 | Vitória do Jari, Brazil | Bantamweight debut. |
| Win | 2–2 | Rogerio Ferreira | KO (punches) | Hombres de Honor 69 | March 12, 2016 | 1 | 0:22 | Laranjal do Jari, Brazil | |
| Loss | 1–2 | Henrique Gomes | TKO (punches) | Clube Fight Vitória 1 | December 15, 2015 | 1 | N/A | Vitória do Jari, Brazil | Featherweight debut. |
| Win | 1–1 | Marcio de Oliveira | Submission (guillotine choke) | Guerreiros da fe Combat 1 | June 14, 2015 | 1 | 1:26 | Laranjal do Jari, Brazil | |
| Loss | 0–1 | Rafael Moreira | Submission (rear-naked choke) | Big Way Fight 3 | November 8, 2013 | 1 | 2:40 | Manaus, Brazil | Lightweight debut. For the BWF Lightweight Championship. |

== See also ==
- List of current UFC fighters
- List of Dana White's Contender Series alumni
- List of male mixed martial artists
