= Talita Alencar =

Brazilian jiu-jitsu practitioner from Brazil and mixed martial artist (born 1990

- Born: Ana Talita de Oliveira Alencar; October 17, 1990 (age 36); Carutapera, Brazil
- Height: 5 ft 1 in (155 cm)
- Weight: 125 lb (57 kg; 8 st 13 lb)
- Division: Strawweight (MMA); Light Feather -53.5 kg (117.9 lb)
- Team: American Combat Gym (MMA); Alliance; GFTeam
- Trainer: Charles McCarthy (MMA); Theodoro Canal
- Rank: BJJ black belt (Note: under Julio Cesar Pereira)
- Years active: 2021–present (MMA)

Mixed martial arts record
- Total: 11
- Wins: 8
- By submission: 4
- By decision: 4
- Losses: 2
- By decision: 2
- Draws: 1

Other information
- Mixed martial arts record from Sherdog

Ana Talita de Oliveira Alencar (born October 17, 1990) is a Brazilian mixed martial artist and black belt Brazilian jiu-jitsu (BJJ) practitioner. She currently competes in the women's Strawweight division of the Ultimate Fighting Championship. A World jiu-jitsu Champion (Gi and No-Gi) in colored belts, she is a three-time IBJJF World No-Gi Champion, and two-time European No-Gi Champion and a World IBJJF and Pan American jiu-jitsu black belt Champion.

== Grappling career ==
Ana Talita de Oliveira Alencar was born on October 17, 1990 in Carutapera, Brazil. At the age of 9, her family moved to Fortaleza. She started competitive swimming at a young age before moving on to triathlon, practicing for 7 years as well as surfing, skateboarding, and capoeira. At the age of fourteen she began training Brazilian jiu-jitsu at Pirillo Roriz' Gracie Barra academy, she later moved to Academia Blec under Bruno Leandro where she was promoted to blue belt.

After receiving her blue belt she moved to Rio de Janeiro where she joined Theodoro Canal's GFTeam Recreio academy. In 2014 Alencar won the American Nationals in purple belt and then became World No-Gi Champion. In 2016 she was promoted to black belt after winning gold at the 2016 IBJJF World Championship, that same year she won the World No-Gi Championship for the first time as a black belt. In August 2016 she left Brazil for Los Angeles joining Alliance Jiu Jitsu.

In 2017 she won the World Championship, the World No-Gi Championship, the Pan-American Championship, the Abu Dhabi World Pro Championship, the Abu Dhabi Grand Slam Abu Dhabi, and the Fight To Win Pro championship. In 2019 during Polaris 11 Women Under 55 kg Championship she was defeated by Ffion Davies via decision. Fighting in the main card of Fight 2 Win Championship 144 she was defeated via points by Nathalie Ribeiro.

Alencar competed in the co-main event of Fight 2 Win 153 on September 25, 2020 against Heather Raftery, with her 125lbs title on the line. She won the match and successfully retained her title. Alencar defended her title again at Fight 2 Win 162 on January 29, 2021 by defeating Gabrielle McComb by decision. In 2021 she became World No-Gi Champion for the third time after defeating Gabrielle McComb once again in the final.

=== Return ===
Alencar returned to jiu-jitsu to win a gold medal in the featherweight division of the IBJJF no gi Pan Championship 2024 on November 3, 2024.

She was scheduled to face Cassia Moura at UFC Fight Pass Invitational 10 on March 6, 2025. The match was rescheduled for UFC BJJ 1 on June 25, 2025. Alencar lost by unanimous decision.

== Mixed martial arts career ==
In 2021 after training under UFC veteran Charles McCarthy and UFC featherweight Charles Rosa, she made her pro-MMA debut in a strawweight bout on the main card of Titan FC 70 in Miami .

Alencar fought Stephanie Luciano to a draw at Dana White's Contender Series 63 on September 19, 2023 and although Luciano received a UFC contract, Alencar did not.

=== Ultimate Fighting Championship ===
Alencar was able to make her UFC debut in a bout against Rayanne dos Santos on December 9, 2023 at UFC Fight Night 233. She won the fight via split decision.

Alencar faced Stephanie Luciano in a rematch on August 10, 2024 at UFC on ESPN 61. She lost the fight by unanimous decision.

Alencar faced Vanessa Demopoulos on April 5, 2025 at UFC on ESPN 65. She won the fight by unanimous decision.

Alencar faced Ariane Carnelossi on November 1, 2025 at UFC Fight Night 263. She won the fight via a rear-naked submission at the end of the third round.

Alencar faced Julia Polastri on April 25, 2026 at UFC Fight Night 274. She won the fight by unanimous decision. 6 out of 11 media outlets scored the bout for Alencar.

Alencar faced Piera Rodríguez on October 31, 2026 at UFC Fight Night 292. She lost the fight by unanimous decision.

== Championships and accomplishments ==
=== Brazilian jiu-jitsu ===
Main Achievements (at black belt):

- IBJJF World Champion (2017)
- IBJJF World No-Gi Champion (2016 / 2017 / 2021)
- IBJJF Pan No-Gi Champion (2019 (Note: Closed division))
- IBJJF European Open No-Gi Champion (2019 (Note: Weight and absolute))
- IBJJF Pan American Champion (2017)
- UAEJJF Grand Slam Champion, Abu Dhabi (2017)
- UAEJJF Grand Slam Champion, Rio (2018)
- UAEJJF Abu Dhabi World Pro Champion (2017)
- 2nd place IBJJF World Championship (2018)
- 2nd place IBJJF Pan No-Gi Championship (2018)
- 2nd place IBJJF European Open (2020)
- 2nd place IBJJF American National (2016)
- 2nd place UAEJJF Grand Slam, LDN (2020)
- 2nd place UAEJJF Grand Slam, Rio (2019)
- 3rd place IBJJF American National (2016 (Note: Absolute))
- 3rd place UAEJJF Abu Dhabi World Pro (2018)
- 3rd place IBJJF Pan No-Gi Championship (2019)

Main Achievements (at colored Belts):

- IBJJF World Champion (2016 brown)
- IBJJF World No-Gi Champion (2014 purple)
- IBJJF American National Champion (2014 purple)
- IBJJF Rio Open Champion (2013 blue)
- 2nd place IBJJF European Open (2016 brown)
- 2nd place IBJJF Pan Championship (2016 brown)
- 2nd place CBJJ Brazilian National (2012 blue)
- 2nd place IBJJF Rio de Janeiro Open (2012 blue)
- 3rd place IBJJF World No-Gi Championship (2014 brown)
- 3rd place IBJJF Pan American Championship (2016 brown)

== Mixed martial arts record ==
Professional record breakdown
11 matches	8 wins	2 losses
By submission	4	0
By decision	4	2
Draws	1	

Res.	Record	Opponent	Method	Event	Date	Round	Time	Location	Notes
Loss	8–2–1	Piera Rodríguez	Decision (unanimous)	UFC Fight Night: Moicano vs. Nolan	October 31, 2026	3	5:00	Las Vegas, Nevada, United States	
Win	8–1–1	Julia Polastri	Decision (unanimous)	UFC Fight Night: Sterling vs. Zalal	April 25, 2026	3	5:00	Las Vegas, Nevada, United States	
Win	7–1–1	Ariane Carnelossi	Submission (rear-naked choke)	UFC Fight Night: Garcia vs. Onama	November 1, 2025	3	4:36	Las Vegas, Nevada, United States	
Win	6–1–1	Vanessa Demopoulos	Decision (unanimous)	UFC on ESPN: Emmett vs. Murphy	April 5, 2025	3	5:00	Las Vegas, Nevada, United States	
Loss	5–1–1	Stephanie Luciano	Decision (unanimous)	UFC on ESPN: Tybura vs. Spivac 2	August 10, 2024	3	5:00	Las Vegas, Nevada, United States	
Win	5–0–1	Rayanne dos Santos	Decision (split)	UFC Fight Night: Song vs. Gutiérrez	December 9, 2023	3	5:00	Las Vegas, Nevada, United States	
Draw	4–0–1	Stephanie Luciano	Draw (unanimous)	Dana White's Contender Series 63	September 19, 2023	3	5:00	Las Vegas, Nevada, United States	
Win	4–0	Kelsey Arnesen	Decision (unanimous)	LFA 156	April 14, 2023	3	5:00	Sioux Falls, South Dakota, United States	
Win	3–0	Karen Quintero	Submission (rear-naked choke)	Titan FC 78	July 29, 2022	1	1:45	Santo Domingo, Dominican Republic	
Win	2–0	Laura Milena Contreras	Submission (rear-naked choke)	Titan FC 75	April 10, 2022	3	3:39	Santo Domingo, Dominican Republic	
Win	1–0	Staci Vega	Submission (rear-naked choke)	Titan FC 70	July 2, 2021	1	4:14	Miami, Florida, United States	Strawweight debut.

== See also ==
- List of current UFC fighters
- List of Dana White's Contender Series alumni
- List of female mixed martial artists
