= UFC Fight Night: Grasso vs. Araújo =

UFC mixed martial arts event in 2022

- The poster for UFC Fight Night: Grasso vs. Araújo
- Promotion: Ultimate Fighting Championship
- Date: October 15, 2022
- Venue: UFC Apex
- City: Enterprise, Nevada, United States
- Attendance: Not announced

Event chronology
UFC Fight Night: Dern vs. Yan	UFC Fight Night: Grasso vs. Araújo	UFC 280: Oliveira vs. Makhachev

UFC Fight Night: Grasso vs. Araújo (also known as UFC Fight Night 212, UFC on ESPN+ 70, and UFC Vegas 62) was a mixed martial arts event produced by the Ultimate Fighting Championship that took place on October 15, 2022, at the UFC Apex facility in Enterprise, Nevada, part of the Las Vegas Metropolitan Area, United States.

== Background ==
The event was originally expected to be headlined by a middleweight bout between former UFC Middleweight Championship challenger Jared Cannonier and Sean Strickland. However, the bout was scrapped after Strickland withdrew due to a finger infection. They instead headlined UFC Fight Night: Cannonier vs. Strickland on December 17.

A women's flyweight bout between Viviane Araújo and Alexa Grasso took place at this event. The pairing was previously scheduled for August 13, 2022 at UFC on ESPN 41. However, Grasso pulled out due to visa issues which restricted her travel and the bout was scrapped. The pair was also previously scheduled to meet at UFC 270, but Araújo pulled out from that event due to injury. They were elevated to main event status in early September after the cancellation of the original headliner.

Melsik Baghdasaryan was expected to face Joanderson Brito in a featherweight bout. However, Baghdasaryan pulled out in late September due to a broken hand. He was replaced by promotional newcomer Lucas Alexander.

A welterweight bout between Neil Magny and Daniel Rodriguez was scheduled for the event. However, Rodriguez withdrew from the bout due to an elbow infection. They were rescheduled for UFC Fight Night: Rodriguez vs. Lemos on November 5.

Askar Askarov and Brandon Royval were expected to meet in a flyweight bout. In turn, it was cancelled a day before the event due to weight cut issues related to Askarov.

At the weigh-ins, C.J. Vergara weighed in at 129 pounds, three pounds over the flyweight non-title fight limit. The bout proceeded at catchweight with Vergara being fined 30% of his purse, which went to his opponent Tatsuro Taira.

== Results ==
Main card (ESPN+)
Weight class				Method	Round	Time	Notes
Women's Flyweight	Alexa Grasso	def.	Viviane Araújo	Decision (unanimous) (50–45, 49–46, 49–46)	5	5:00
Bantamweight	Jonathan Martinez	def.	Cub Swanson	TKO (leg kick)	2	4:19
Middleweight	Duško Todorović	def.	Jordan Wright	TKO (punches and elbows)	2	3:12
Bantamweight	Raphael Assunção	def.	Victor Henry	Decision (unanimous) (30–27, 30–27, 30–27)	3	5:00
Light Heavyweight	Alonzo Menifield	def.	Misha Cirkunov	KO (punches)	1	1:28
Preliminary card (ESPN+)
Bantamweight	Leomana Martinez	def.	Brandon Davis	Decision (split) (28–29, 29–28, 29–28)	3	5:00
Middleweight	Jacob Malkoun	def.	Nick Maximov	Decision (unanimous) (30–27, 30–27, 30–27)	3	5:00
Featherweight	Joanderson Brito	def.	Lucas Alexander	Submission (rear-naked choke)	1	2:02
Women's Strawweight	Piera Rodríguez	def.	Sam Hughes	Decision (unanimous) (29–28, 29–28, 29–28)	3	5:00
Catchweight (129 lb)	Tatsuro Taira	def.	C.J. Vergara	Submission (armbar)	2	4:19
Welterweight	Pete Rodriguez	def.	Mike Jackson	KO (punches and knee)	1	1:33

== Bonus awards ==
The following fighters received $50,000 bonuses.

- Fight of the Night: Duško Todorović vs. Jordan Wright
- Performance of the Night: Jonathan Martinez and Tatsuro Taira

== See also ==
- List of UFC events
- List of current UFC fighters
- 2022 in UFC
