= Yazmin Jauregui =

Mexican mixed martial artist (born 1999)

- Born: Yazmin Yazareth Gutiérrez Jauregui; February 28, 1999 (age 27); Rosarito, Baja California, Mexico
- Height: 5 ft 3 in (1.60 m)
- Weight: 115 lb (52 kg; 8 st 3 lb)
- Division: Strawweight
- Fighting out of: Tijuana, Baja California, Mexico
- Team: Entram Gym
- Years active: 2018–present

Mixed martial arts record
- Total: 14
- Wins: 12
- By knockout: 8
- By decision: 4
- Losses: 2
- By knockout: 1
- By submission: 1

Other information
- Mixed martial arts record from Sherdog

Yazmin Yazareth Gutiérrez Jauregui (born February 28, 1999) is a Mexican professional mixed martial artist currently fighting in the women's Strawweight division of the Ultimate Fighting Championship (UFC). A professional since 2018, Jauregui has also competed in Combate Global.

== Mixed martial arts career ==
=== Early career and Combate Global ===
Jauregui made her professional MMA career at Fearless Fight Night 4, on November 10, 2018, against Benni Fuentes. She won the bout by first-round technical knockout.

Jauregui faced Daniela Espinosa at Combate 36: Reinas, on April 26, 2019. She won the bout by first-round knockout.

Jauregui faced McKenna Mitchell at Combate 39: Unbreakable, on June 7, 2019. She won the bout by second-round technical knockout via doctor stoppage.

Jauregui faced Yajaira Romero at Combate 44: Mexicali, on September 20, 2019. She won the bout by unanimous decision.

Jauregui faced Annely Jimenez García for the UWC Women's Strawweight Championship at UWC Mexico 24 on November 13, 2020. She won fight via first-round technical knockout. The referee for the fight was Daniela Modad, who faced Jiménez García twelve years ago.

Jauregui faced Stephanie Frausto at the quarterfinal match of the Combate Global: Last Latina Standing tournament on August 13, 2021. She won the bout by unanimous decision. Jauregui then faced Criszaida Adames in the semi-final match. She won the bout by first-round technical knockout. Jauregui faced Claire Lopez in the final. She won that bout by first-round technical knockout to win the tournament.

=== Ultimate Fighting Championship ===
Jauregui was scheduled to face Istela Nunes at UFC on ESPN 41, on August 13, 2022. However, Nunes withdrew due to injury and was replaced by Iasmin Lucindo. Jauregui won the bout by unanimous decision.

Jauregui faced Nunes at UFC on ESPN: Thompson vs. Holland on December 3, 2022. She won the fight by a second-round technical knockout.

Jauregui faced Denise Gomes at UFC 290 on July 8, 2023. She lost the fight by a first-round technical knockout.

Jauregui faced Sam Hughes on February 24, 2024, at UFC Fight Night 237. She won the bout by unanimous decision.

Jauregui faced Ketlen Souza on September 14, 2024, at UFC 306. She lost the fight via a rear-naked choke submission in the first round.

Jauregui was scheduled to face Dione Barbosa on March 29, 2025, at UFC on ESPN 64. However, Barbosa was replaced by former LFA Women's Strawweight Champion Julia Polastri in a strawweight bout after Jauregui decided not to face Barbosa. In turn, Jauregui withdrew from the bout due to an injury and was replaced by Loopy Godínez.

Jauregui faced Vanessa Demopoulos on September 26, 2026, at UFC Fight Night 289. She won the fight by knockout early into the first round round. This win earned Jauregui her first Performance of the Night bonus award.

== Championships and accomplishments ==
=== Mixed martial arts ===
- Ultimate Fighting Championship
  - Performance of the Night (One time) vs. Vanessa Demopoulos
  - UFC Honors Awards
    - 2022: Fan's Choice Debut of the Year Nominee vs. Iasmin Lucindo
  - UFC.com Awards
    - 2022: Ranked #5 Newcomer of the Year
- Combate Global
  - Combate Global: Last Latina Standing Tournament Championship
- Ultimate Warrior Challenge Mexico
  - UWC Women's Strawweight World Champion (one time)
- ESPN
  - 2022 UFC Women's Rookie of the Year

== Mixed martial arts record ==
Professional record breakdown
14 matches	12 wins	2 losses
By knockout	8	1
By submission	0	1
By decision	4	0

Res.	Record	Opponent	Method	Event	Date	Round	Time	Location	Notes
Win	12–2	Vanessa Demopoulos	KO (punches)	UFC Fight Night: Rosas Jr. vs. Barcelos	26 September 2026	1	1:02	Las Vegas, Nevada, United States	Performance of the Night.
Loss	11–2	Ketlen Souza	Technical Submission (rear-naked choke)	UFC 306	14 September 2024	1	3:02	Las Vegas, Nevada, United States	
Win	11–1	Sam Hughes	Decision (unanimous)	UFC Fight Night: Moreno vs. Royval 2	24 February 2024	3	5:00	Mexico City, Mexico	
Loss	10–1	Denise Gomes	TKO (punches)	UFC 290	8 July 2023	1	0:20	Las Vegas, Nevada, United States	
Win	10–0	Istela Nunes	TKO (punches)	UFC on ESPN: Thompson vs. Holland	3 December 2022	2	4:06	Orlando, Florida, United States	
Win	9–0	Iasmin Lucindo	Decision (unanimous)	UFC on ESPN: Vera vs. Cruz	13 August 2022	3	5:00	San Diego, California, United States	
Win	8–0	Claire Lopez	TKO (punches)	Combate Global: Last Latina Standing	13 August 2021	1	4:16	Miami, Florida, United States	Won the Combate Global: Last Latina Standing Tournament.
Win	7–0	Criszaida Adames	TKO (punches)	Combate Global: Last Latina Standing	13 August 2021	1	3:14	Miami, Florida, United States	Combate Global: Last Latina Standing Tournament Semifinal.
Win	6–0	Stephanie Frausto	Decision (unanimous)	Combate Global: Last Latina Standing	13 August 2021	1	5:00	Miami, Florida, United States	Combate Global: Last Latina Standing Tournament Quarterfinal.
Win	5–0	Annely Jimenez Garcia	TKO (doctor stoppage)	UWC Mexico 24	13 November 2020	1	5:00	Tijuana, Mexico	Won the UWC Women's Strawweight Championship.
Win	4–0	Yajaira Romo	Decision (unanimous)	Combate 44: Mexicali	20 September 2019	3	5:00	Mexicali, Mexico	
Win	3–0	McKenna Mitchell	TKO (doctor stoppage)	Combate 39: Unbreakable	7 June 2019	2	5:00	Tucson, Arizona, United States	
Win	2–0	Daniela Espinosa	KO (punches)	Combate 36: Reinas	26 April 2019	1	0:13	Los Angeles, California, United States	Strawweight debut.
Win	1–0	Benni Fuentes	TKO (elbows)	Fearless Fight Night 4	10 November 2018	1	2:22	Mexico City, Mexico	Flyweight debut.

== See also ==
- List of current UFC fighters
- List of Mexican UFC fighters
- List of female mixed martial artists
