= UFC on ABC: Sandhagen vs. Nurmagomedov =

Mixed martial arts event in 2024

- The poster for UFC on ABC: Sandhagen vs. Nurmagomedov
- Promotion: Ultimate Fighting Championship
- Date: August 3, 2024
- Venue: Etihad Arena
- City: Abu Dhabi, United Arab Emirates
- Attendance: Not announced

Event chronology
UFC 304: Edwards vs. Muhammad 2	UFC on ABC: Sandhagen vs. Nurmagomedov	UFC on ESPN: Tybura vs. Spivac 2

UFC on ABC: Sandhagen vs. Nurmagomedov (also known as UFC on ABC 7) was a mixed martial arts event by the Ultimate Fighting Championship that took place on August 3, 2024, at the Etihad Arena in Abu Dhabi, United Arab Emirates.

== Background ==
The event marked the promotion's 19th visit to Abu Dhabi and first since UFC 294 in October 2023.

A bantamweight title eliminator bout between former interim UFC Bantamweight Championship challenger Cory Sandhagen and Umar Nurmagomedov headlined the event. The pair was previously expected to headline at UFC on ESPN: Sandhagen vs. Font, but Nurmagomedov withdrew from the event due to a shoulder injury.

A five-round co-main event featuring former WEC and Strikeforce Welterweight Champion Nick Diaz (also former UFC Welterweight Championship challenger) and Vicente Luque was expected to take place at the event. However, the bout was removed from the event due to travel issues related to Diaz and the pairing will be postponed to a future date.

A welterweight bout between former interim UFC Lightweight Champion (also The Ultimate Fighter: Team Lesnar vs. Team dos Santos welterweight winner) Tony Ferguson and The Ultimate Fighter: Live lightweight winner Michael Chiesa took place at the event. The pair was previously expected to headline at UFC Fight Night: McDonald vs. Lineker, but Chiesa pulled out due to a back injury.

A middleweight bout between Denis Tiuliulin and Sedriques Dumas was scheduled to take place at UFC on ABC: Whittaker vs. Aliskerov. However, due to visa issues relating to Dumas, that bout was postponed and took place at this event.

Javid Basharat and Chris Gutiérrez were expected to meet in a bantamweight bout on the preliminary card, but the pairing was moved to UFC Fight Night: Tybura vs. Spivac 2 a week later for unknown reasons.

A lightweight bout between Abdul-Kareem Al-Selwady and Guram Kutateladze was scheduled for this event. However, Al-Selwady withdrew from the fight due to an injury and was replaced by promotional newcomer Jordan Vucenic.

A flyweight bout between Azat Maksum and C.J. Vergara was scheduled for this event. However, Maksum withdrew from the fight due to an injury and the bout was cancelled.

== Results ==
Main card (ABC / ESPN+)
Weight class				Method	Round	Time	Notes
Bantamweight	Umar Nurmagomedov	def.	Cory Sandhagen	Decision (unanimous) (50–45, 49–46, 49–46)	5	5:00	(Note: UFC Bantamweight title eliminator.)
Middleweight	Sharabutdin Magomedov	def.	Michał Oleksiejczuk	Decision (unanimous) (30–27, 30–27, 29–28)	3	5:00
Bantamweight	Deiveson Figueiredo	def.	Marlon Vera	Decision (unanimous) (29–28, 29–28, 30–27)	3	5:00
Welterweight	Michael Chiesa	def.	Tony Ferguson	Submission (rear-naked choke)	1	3:44
Women's Strawweight	Mackenzie Dern	def.	Loopy Godínez	Decision (unanimous) (29–28, 29–28, 29–28)	3	5:00
Lightweight	Joel Álvarez	def.	Elves Brener	TKO (knees and punches)	3	3:36
Preliminary card (ESPN2 / ESPN+)
Light Heavyweight	Azamat Murzakanov	def.	Alonzo Menifield	KO (punches)	2	3:18
Lightweight	Kauê Fernandes	def.	Mohammad Yahya	TKO (punches)	1	4:45
Heavyweight	Shamil Gaziev	def.	Don'Tale Mayes	Decision (unanimous) (30–27, 30–27, 30–27)	3	5:00
Lightweight	Guram Kutateladze	def.	Jordan Vucenic	Decision (unanimous) (29–28, 29–28, 29–28)	3	5:00
Women's Strawweight	Sam Hughes	def.	Victoria Dudakova	Decision (split) (27–30, 29–28, 29–28)	3	5:00
Lightweight	Jai Herbert	def.	Rolando Bedoya	Decision (unanimous) (30–27, 30–27, 29–28)	3	5:00
Middleweight	Sedriques Dumas	def.	Denis Tiuliulin	Decision (unanimous) (29–28, 29–28, 30–27)	3	5:00

== Bonus awards ==
The following fighters received $50,000 bonuses.

- Fight of the Night: Sharabutdin Magomedov vs. Michał Oleksiejczuk
- Performance of the Night: Joel Álvarez and Azamat Murzakanov

== See also ==
- 2024 in UFC
- List of current UFC fighters
- List of UFC events
