= Pat Sabatini =

American mixed martial arts fighter

- Born: Patrick Daniel Sabatini; November 9, 1990 (age 35); Bristol, Pennsylvania, U.S.
- Height: 5 ft 9 in (1.75 m)
- Weight: 145 lb (66 kg; 10 st 5 lb)
- Division: Featherweight
- Reach: 70 in (178 cm)
- Fighting out of: Philadelphia, Pennsylvania, U.S.
- Team: MPR Endurance MMA
- Rank: Black belt in Brazilian Jiu-Jitsu under Daniel Gracie; Black belt in Tang Soo Do
- Wrestling: NCAA Division I Wrestling
- Years active: 2014–present

Mixed martial arts record
- Total: 27
- Wins: 22
- By knockout: 2
- By submission: 12
- By decision: 8
- Losses: 5
- By knockout: 3
- By decision: 2

Other information
- University: Rider University
- Mixed martial arts record from Sherdog

Patrick Daniel Sabatini (born November 9, 1990) is an American mixed martial artist who currently competes in the Featherweight division of the Ultimate Fighting Championship. As of June 20, 2026, he is #7 in the Meta UFC featherweight rankings.

== Background ==
Born and raised in Bristol, Pennsylvania, Sabatini initially played ice hockey at his father's behest. After a school bully stuck Pat’s head in a urinal, he started training Tang Soo Do which led to Brazilian Jiu-Jitsu a couple of years later. Afterwards he picked up Wrestling, and Sambo. He has a younger sister. He has a Bachelor of Arts degree from Rider University.

== Mixed martial arts career ==
=== Early career ===
In his MMA debut for Cage Fury Fighting Championships at CFFC 35, he submitted Jacob Bohn via rear naked choke in the first round, before beating his next opponent Shelby Graham in the same manner. After suffering his first loss via unanimous decision to Robert Watley at CFFC 45, he rebounded at CFFC 52, where he submitted Tony Gravely in the first round via rear naked choke. Sabatini would go on to win his next three bouts outside if CFFC, before he returned to appear in the main event of CFFC 67, where he tapped out John de Jesus in the first round via heel hook, winning the CFFC Featherweight Championship. Sabatini defended the title submitting Francisco Isata via rear naked choke in round two at CFFC 69. Sabatini faced Jose Mariscal at Victory FC 60, losing the bout via split decision. Rebounding at CES MMA 52, he defeating Borah Karmo via first round rear-naked choke.

At CFFC 71, Sabatini faced Da’Mon Blackshear and defeated him via unanimous decision, winning back the CFFC Featherweight Championship. Defending his title at CFFC 74, he faced Fabricio Oliveira and tapped him out via rear naked choke in round two.

Sabatini would lose the CFFC Featherweight Championship to James Gonzalez at CFFC 81 after he broke his arm in a gruesome manner after refusing to tap. Returned at CFFC 84 against Jordan Titoni, winning the bout after knocking out Titoni in the first round. He would then win back the Featherweight title, submitting Jesse Stirn via armbar in the second round at CFFC 91.

=== Ultimate Fighting Championship ===
Sabatini was signed to replace Mike Trizano on short notice against Rafael Alves at UFC Fight Night 185 on February 20, 2021. However, Alves missed weight by 11.5lbs – a UFC record to date – and the bout was cancelled.

He ultimately made his UFC debut against Tristan Connelly at UFC 261 on April 24, 2021. He won the fight via unanimous decision after knocking Connelly down early in the first round.

Sabatini then made his sophomore appearance in the organization against Jamall Emmers at UFC on ESPN 30 on August 28, 2021. He won the fight via first-round submission, gaining his first Performance of the Night bonus.

He was then initially scheduled to face Gavin Tucker at UFC Fight Night 198 on November 20, 2021. However, Tucker withdrew from the bout due to an unknown reason and was replaced by Tucker Lutz. Sabatini won the bout via unanimous decision.

The match between Gavin Tucker and Sabatini was rescheduled for UFC 273 on April 9, 2022. However, Tucker pulled out for unknown reasons and Sabatini was rebooked against T.J. Laramie on April 16, 2022 at UFC on ESPN 34. Sabatini won the fight via unanimous decision.

Sabatini faced Damon Jackson on September 17, 2022 at UFC Fight Night 210. He lost the fight via technical knockout in round one.

Sabatini faced Lucas Almeida on June 17, 2023 at UFC on ESPN 47, winning the fight via an arm-triangle submission in the second round.

Sabatini faced Diego Lopes on November 11, 2023, at UFC 295. He lost the fight via knockout in the first round.

Sabatini was scheduled to face Nate Landwehr on March 30, 2024, at UFC on ESPN 54. However, Sabatini withdrew for unknown reasons and was replaced by Jamall Emmers.

Sabatini faced Jonathan Pearce on October 12, 2024 at UFC Fight Night 244. He won the fight via a rear-naked choke submission in the first round.

Sabatini faced Joanderson Brito on April 5, 2025 at UFC on ESPN 65. He won the fight by unanimous decision.

Sabatini faced Chepe Mariscal in a rematch on November 15, 2025 at UFC 322. He won the fight by unanimous decision.

Sabatini faced William Gomis on May 9, 2026, at UFC 328. He won the fight by unanimous decision.

Sabatini is scheduled to face Vinicius Oliveira on January 23, 2027 at UFC Fight Night 297.

== Professional grappling career ==
Sabatini competed against Niko Price at Fury Pro Grappling 8 on December 30, 2023. He won the match by submission with a Suloev Stretch.

Sabatini competed against Andre Kochel at Fury Pro Grappling 10 on May 24, 2024. He won the match by golden score in overtime.

Sabatini competed against Herbert Burns at Fury Pro Grappling 11 on November 2, 2024. He won the match by golden score in overtime.

Sabatini faced Peter Fazekas at Fury Pro Grappling 12 on December 28, 2024. He won the match by submission with an ankle-lock.

== Championships and accomplishments ==
- Ultimate Fighting Championship
  - Performance of the Night (One time) vs. Jamall Emmers
  - UFC.com Awards
    - 2021: Ranked #10 Newcomer of the Year
- Cage Fury Fighting Championships
  - CFFC Featherweight Championship (two times; former)
    - Three successful title defenses (first reign)

== Mixed martial arts record ==
Professional record breakdown
27 matches	22 wins	5 losses
By knockout	2	3
By submission	12	0
By decision	8	2

Res.	Record	Opponent	Method	Event	Date	Round	Time	Location	Notes
Win	22–5	William Gomis	Decision (unanimous)	UFC 328	May 9, 2026	3	5:00	Newark, New Jersey, United States	
Win	21–5	Chepe Mariscal	Decision (unanimous)	UFC 322	November 15, 2025	3	5:00	New York City, New York, United States	
Win	20–5	Joanderson Brito	Decision (unanimous)	UFC on ESPN: Emmett vs. Murphy	April 5, 2025	3	5:00	Las Vegas, Nevada, United States	
Win	19–5	Jonathan Pearce	Submission (rear-naked choke)	UFC Fight Night: Royval vs. Taira	October 12, 2024	1	4:06	Las Vegas, Nevada, United States	
Loss	18–5	Diego Lopes	KO (punches)	UFC 295	November 11, 2023	1	1:30	New York City, New York, United States	
Win	18–4	Lucas Almeida	Submission (arm-triangle choke)	UFC on ESPN: Vettori vs. Cannonier	June 17, 2023	2	1:48	Las Vegas, Nevada, United States	
Loss	17–4	Damon Jackson	TKO (punches)	UFC Fight Night: Sandhagen vs. Song	September 17, 2022	1	1:09	Las Vegas, Nevada, United States	
Win	17–3	T.J. Laramie	Decision (unanimous)	UFC on ESPN: Luque vs. Muhammad 2	April 16, 2022	3	5:00	Las Vegas, Nevada, United States	
Win	16–3	Tucker Lutz	Decision (unanimous)	UFC Fight Night: Vieira vs. Tate	November 20, 2021	3	5:00	Las Vegas, Nevada, United States	
Win	15–3	Jamall Emmers	Submission (heel hook)	UFC on ESPN: Barboza vs. Chikadze	August 28, 2021	1	1:53	Las Vegas, Nevada, United States	Performance of the Night.
Win	14–3	Tristan Connelly	Decision (unanimous)	UFC 261	April 24, 2021	3	5:00	Jacksonville, Florida, United States	
Win	13–3	Jesse Stirn	Submission (armbar)	Cage Fury FC 91	December 18, 2020	2	2:23	Lancaster, Pennsylvania, United States	Won the vacant Cage Fury FC Featherweight Championship.
Win	12–3	Jordan Titoni	KO (punches)	Cage Fury FC 84	September 17, 2020	1	2:26	Tunica, Mississippi, United States	
Loss	11–3	James Gonzalez	TKO (arm injury)	Cage Fury FC 81	February 1, 2020	1	0:46	Bensalem, Pennsylvania, United States	Lost the Cage Fury FC Featherweight Championship.
Win	11–2	Fabricio Oliveira	Submission (rear-naked choke)	Cage Fury FC 74	May 17, 2019	2	1:45	Atlantic City, New Jersey, United States	Defended the Cage Fury FC Featherweight Championship.
Win	10–2	Da'Mon Blackshear	Decision (unanimous)	Cage Fury FC 71	December 14, 2018	4	5:00	Atlantic City, New Jersey, United States	Defended the Cage Fury FC Featherweight Championship.
Win	9–2	Boimah Karmo	TKO (punches)	CES MMA 52	August 17, 2018	2	2:16	Philadelphia, Pennsylvania, United States	
Loss	8–2	Chepe Mariscal	Decision (split)	Victory FC 60	April 14, 2018	3	5:00	Hammond, Indiana, United States	
Win	8–1	Francisco Isata	Submission (rear-naked choke)	Cage Fury FC 69	December 16, 2017	2	2:47	Atlantic City, New Jersey, United States	Defended the Cage Fury FC Featherweight Championship.
Win	7–1	John de Jesus	Submission (heel hook)	Cage Fury FC 67	September 16, 2017	1	0:50	Philadelphia, Pennsylvania, United States	Won the vacant Cage Fury FC Featherweight Championship.
Win	6–1	Michael Lawrence	Submission (rear-naked choke)	Ring of Combat 58	February 24, 2017	2	2:49	Atlantic City, New Jersey, United States	
Win	5–1	Renaldo Weekley	Submission (heel hook)	Dead Serious 22	November 5, 2016	1	1:17	Philadelphia, Pennsylvania, United States	
Win	4–1	William Calhoun III	Decision (unanimous)	Dead Serious 18	February 6, 2016	3	5:00	Philadelphia, Pennsylvania, United States	
Win	3–1	Tony Gravely	Submission (rear-naked choke)	Cage Fury FC 52	October 31, 2015	1	2:47	Atlantic City, New Jersey, United States	
Loss	2–1	Robert Watley	Decision (unanimous)	Cage Fury FC 45	February 7, 2015	3	5:00	Bethlehem, Pennsylvania, United States	Catchweight (150 lb) bout.
Win	2–0	Shelby Graham	Submission (rear-naked choke)	Cage Fury FC 42	October 25, 2014	1	1:04	Chester, Pennsylvania, United States	
Win	1–0	Jacob Bohn	Submission (rear-naked choke)	Cage Fury FC 35	April 26, 2014	1	2:22	Atlantic City, New Jersey, United States	Featherweight debut.

== Submission grappling record ==
2 Matches, 2 Wins 0 Loss
Result	Rec.	Opponent	Method	Event	Date	Location
Win	2–0	(United States) Niko Price	Submission (Suloev Stretch)	Fury Pro Grappling 8	30 December 2023	Philadelphia, Pennsylvania, United States
Win	1–0	(United States) Alex Caceres	Submission (Rear Naked Choke)	Fury Pro Grappling 6	30 December 2022	Philadelphia, Pennsylvania, United States

== See also ==
- List of current UFC fighters
- List of male mixed martial artists
