= UFC Fight Night: Muhammad vs. Bonfim =

Mixed martial arts event in 2026

- The poster for UFC Fight Night: Muhammad vs. Bonfim
- Promotion: Ultimate Fighting Championship
- Date: June 6, 2026
- Venue: Meta Apex
- City: Enterprise, Nevada, United States
- Attendance: Not announced

Event chronology
UFC Fight Night: Song vs. Figueiredo	UFC Fight Night: Muhammad vs. Bonfim	UFC Freedom 250

UFC Fight Night: Muhammad vs. Bonfim (also known as UFC Fight Night 278 and UFC Vegas 118) was a mixed martial arts event produced by the Ultimate Fighting Championship that took place on June 6, 2026, at the Meta Apex in Enterprise, Nevada, part of the Las Vegas Valley, United States.

== Background ==
A welterweight bout between former UFC Welterweight Champion Belal Muhammad and former LFA Welterweight Champion Gabriel Bonfim served as the event headliner.

A featherweight bout between Jordan Leavitt and Joanderson Brito took place at the event. The pairing was originally scheduled to meet at UFC Fight Night: Allen vs. Costa two weeks prior, but the bout was moved to this card for undisclosed reasons.

Former KSW Bantamweight Champion Jakub Wikłacz was expected to face Marcus McGhee in a bantamweight bout at the event. However, Wikłacz pulled out in early May due to injury and was replaced by John Yannis.

A light heavyweight bout between Iwo Baraniewski and Billy Elekana was scheduled for the event. However, Elekana withdrew for undisclosed reasons and was replaced by Junior Tafa.

Matt Schnell and Imanol Rodríguez were scheduled to meet in a flyweight bout on the main card. However, Rodríguez withdrew nine days before the event and was replaced by Alessandro Costa in a catchweight of 130 pounds. Schnell and Costa were scheduled to face each other before at UFC Fight Night: Burns vs. Brady in September 2024, but the latter was forced off the bout just days before the event due to a shoulder injury.

In addition, Victor Henry was scheduled to face Bryce Mitchell in a bantamweight bout at the event. However, Henry withdrew on May 28 and was replaced by Santiago Luna.

== Results ==
Main card (Paramount+)
Weight class				Method	Round	Time	Notes
Welterweight	Gabriel Bonfim	def.	Belal Muhammad	Decision (unanimous) (50–45, 50–45, 50–45)	5	5:00
Middleweight	Brendan Allen	def.	Edmen Shahbazyan	Decision (unanimous) (30–27, 30–27, 29–28)	3	5:00
Lightweight	Tom Nolan	def.	Farès Ziam	Decision (unanimous) (29–28, 29–28, 29–28)	3	5:00
Bantamweight	Bryce Mitchell	def.	Santiago Luna	Submission (arm-triangle choke)	3	4:52
Light Heavyweight	Iwo Baraniewski	def.	Junior Tafa	TKO (leg kick and punches)	1	1:25
Preliminary card (Paramount+)
Catchweight (130 lb)	Alessandro Costa	def.	Matt Schnell	TKO (punches)	1	2:28
Bantamweight	Marcus McGhee	def.	John Yannis	Decision (unanimous) (30–27, 30–27, 29–28)	3	5:00
Flyweight	Édgar Cháirez	def.	Bruno Gustavo da Silva	Submission (rear-naked choke)	1	4:13
Women's Bantamweight	Chelsea Chandler	def.	Priscila Cachoeira	Submission (armbar)	1	3:42
Featherweight	Joanderson Brito	def.	Jordan Leavitt	Submission (ninja choke)	1	4:19
Women's Flyweight	Jeisla Chaves	def.	Yuneisy Duben	Decision (split) (29–28, 28–29, 29–28)	3	5:00
Women's Strawweight	Ketlen Souza	def.	Ariane Carnelossi	KO (punches and head kick)	1	1:34

== Bonus awards ==
The following fighters received $100,000 bonuses. The other finishes received $25,000 additional bonuses.

- Fight of the Night: Brendan Allen vs. Edmen Shahbazyan
- Performance of the Night: Iwo Baraniewski and Édgar Cháirez

== See also ==
- 2026 in UFC
- List of current UFC fighters
- List of UFC events
