= Loopy Godínez =

Mexican mixed martial artist (born 1993)

- Born: María Guadalupe Godínez González; September 6, 1993 (age 33); Aguascalientes, Mexico
- Other names: Loopy
- Citizenship: Mexico; Canada
- Height: 5 ft 2 in (1.57 m)
- Weight: 115 lb (52 kg; 8 st 3 lb)
- Division: Strawweight
- Reach: 61 in (155 cm)
- Fighting out of: Vancouver, British Columbia, Canada
- Team: Titan MMA (2014–present); Lobo Gym MMA (2021–present)
- Rank: Purple belt in Brazilian Jiu-Jitsu under Nabil Salameh
- Years active: 2018–present

Mixed martial arts record
- Total: 21
- Wins: 15
- By knockout: 1
- By submission: 2
- By decision: 12
- Losses: 6
- By submission: 1
- By decision: 5

Other information
- Mixed martial arts record from Sherdog

María Guadalupe Godínez González (born September 6, 1993), also known as Lupita Godínez or by her nickname Loopy, is a Mexican and Canadian professional mixed martial artist. She currently competes in the women's Strawweight division of the Ultimate Fighting Championship (UFC). As of October 31, 2026, she is #10 in the Meta UFC women's strawweight rankings.

== Early life ==
When Godínez was 14, her father Carlos was approached by the cartel who demanded protection money. After he found a lot full of bullet-riddled cars and shattered windows, and answered phone calls with voices telling him his daughters' names and schools, Carlos decided to take his family and leave. Telling his family that they were leaving for Disneyland, instead they landed in Vancouver, where they had to start from scratch. They lived out of a hotel for six months, and did odd jobs such as washing cars to pay the bills. After life stabilized, Godínez was encouraged by her boyfriend to get back into judo that she had done since childhood, and then into jiu-jitsu. She is a dual citizen of Mexico and Canada.

== Mixed martial arts career ==
=== Early career ===
Godínez began her MMA career as an amateur in 2016. Her debut match was held on June 18, 2016, and it was against Ali Cranmer. She won the match via decision. In her following bouts, she lost against Jamey-Lyn Horth Wessels on two different occasions, on November 25, 2016, and February 18, 2017, respectively.

Despite two straight losses, she bounced back and won her next two bouts against Ashlee Jarvis and Kyla Frajman. Her winning streak was stopped once again when she faced Tiffany Conama and Morgan Engelhardt, respectively.

In her next two matches, she showed what she could as she defeated Alexandra Lucia Delgado-Lopez and Sam Hughes. When she won against Sam Hughes, she also captured the COGA Strawweight Championship. After that, she decided to turn professional.

On June 30, 2018, Godínez made her professional MMA debut when she faced Jennah Macallister—she won the bout via a unanimous decision. She went on to defeat both Ashlee Mastin and Felisha Magallan in 2019.

Godínez managed to capture the vacant BTC Strawweight Championship defeating Lindsay Garbatt at BTC 8 on November 30, 2019. In the next bout at LFA 94, Godínez captured the LFA Women's Strawweight Championship, defeating Vanessa Demopoulos via majority decision.

=== Ultimate Fighting Championship ===
Godínez, as a replacement for Hannah Goldy faced Jessica Penne at UFC on ESPN 22 on April 17, 2021. Godínez lost the close bout via split decision. 11 out of 17 media scores gave it to Godínez.

Godínez, as a replacement for Stephanie Egger, was expected to face Sarah Alpar on May 22, 2021, on UFC Fight Night 188. The bout was scrapped completely a day later as Godínez wasn't able to get her visa in time.

Godínez was expected to face Sam Hughes on October 8, 2021, at UFC Fight Night 194. However, Hughes was pulled from the bout after testing positive for COVID-19 and was replaced by promotional newcomer Silvana Gómez Juárez. She won the bout via armbar in the first round. This fight earned her the Performance of the Night award.

On a one-week turnaround, Godínez, as a replacement for Sijara Eubanks, faced Luana Carolina on October 16, 2021, at UFC Fight Night 195. With this bout, she earned the record for the fastest turnaround in modern UFC history at just seven days. She lost the fight via unanimous decision.

Godínez, replacing Cheyanne Buys, faced Loma Lookboonmee on November 20, 2021, at UFC Fight Night 198. She won the bout via unanimous decision.

Godínez faced Ariane Carnelossi on May 7, 2022, at UFC 274. She won the fight via unanimous decision.

Godínez faced Angela Hill on August 13, 2022, at UFC on ESPN 41. She lost the fight via unanimous decision.

Godínez faced Cynthia Calvillo on April 8, 2023, at UFC 287. She won the close bout via split decision.

Godínez faced Emily Ducote, replacing Polyana Viana, on May 20, 2023, at UFC Fight Night 223. She won the fight via unanimous decision.

Godínez faced Elise Reed on September 16, 2023, at UFC Fight Night 227. She won the fight via a rear-naked choke submission in round two. This win earned her the Performance of the Night award.

Godínez faced Tabatha Ricci on November 11, 2023, at UFC 295. She won by split decision and became the first woman to win 4 fights in the UFC in a calendar year.

Godínez faced Virna Jandiroba on March 30, 2024, at UFC on ESPN 54. She lost the fight via unanimous decision.

Godínez faced Mackenzie Dern on August 3, 2024, at UFC on ABC 7. She lost the fight by unanimous decision.

Replacing an injured Yazmin Jauregui, Godínez faced former LFA Women's Strawweight Champion Julia Polastri on March 29, 2025, at UFC on ESPN 64. Godínez won the fight by unanimous decision.

Godínez faced former UFC Women's Strawweight Champion Jéssica Andrade on August 16, 2025, at UFC 319. She won the fight via unanimous decision.

Godínez faced Tatiana Suarez on April 11, 2026, at UFC 327. She lost the fight via a rear-naked choke submission in the second round.

Godinez faced Ketlen Souza on October 10, 2026, at UFC Fight Night 290. At the weigh-ins, Souza weighed in at 117 pounds, one pound over the women's strawweight non-title fight limit, so Souza was fined 20 percent of her individual purse which went to Godinez. She won the fight by unanimous decision.

== Personal life ==
Godínez has three younger sisters, of whom two – Karla and Ana – are accomplished wrestlers competing with the Canadian national team.

== Championships and accomplishments ==
- Ultimate Fighting Championship
  - Performance of the Night (Two times) vs. Silvana Gómez Juárez and Elise Reed
  - Record for fastest turnaround in Modern UFC history (7 days)
  - Record for shortest span between three fights in Modern UFC history (42 days)
  - Tied (Carla Esparza, Tatiana Suarez & Yan Xiaonan) for the second longest win streak in UFC Women's Strawweight division history (6)
  - Second most takedowns landed in UFC Women's Strawweight division history (38) (behind Carla Esparza)
  - Second highest significant strike defense percentage in UFC Women's Strawweight division history (64.1%)
  - Fourth most submission attempts in UFC Women's Strawweight division history (11)
  - First and only woman to win four fights in a calendar year in UFC history
  - UFC.com Awards
    - 2021: Ranked #6 Newcomer of the Year
- Legacy Fighting Alliance (LFA)
  - LFA Women's Strawweight Champion (one time; former)
- BTC Fight Promotions
  - BTC Strawweight Championship (One time)
- MMA Fighting
  - 2023 Second Team MMA All-Star
  - 2025 Third Team MMA All-Star

== Mixed martial arts record ==
Professional record breakdown
21 matches	15 wins	6 losses
By knockout	1	0
By submission	2	1
By decision	12	5

Res.	Record	Opponent	Method	Event	Date	Round	Time	Location	Notes
Win	15–6	Ketlen Souza	Decision (unanimous)	UFC Fight Night: Allen vs. Duncan	October 10, 2026	3	5:00	Las Vegas, Nevada, United States	Catchweight (117 lb) bout; Souza missed weight.
Loss	14–6	Tatiana Suarez	Submission (rear-naked choke)	UFC 327	April 11, 2026	2	2:29	Miami, Florida, United States	
Win	14–5	Jéssica Andrade	Decision (unanimous)	UFC 319	August 16, 2025	3	5:00	Chicago, Illinois, United States	
Win	13–5	Julia Polastri	Decision (unanimous)	UFC on ESPN: Moreno vs. Erceg	March 29, 2025	3	5:00	Mexico City, Mexico	
Loss	12–5	Mackenzie Dern	Decision (unanimous)	UFC on ABC: Sandhagen vs. Nurmagomedov	August 3, 2024	3	5:00	Abu Dhabi, United Arab Emirates	
Loss	12–4	Virna Jandiroba	Decision (unanimous)	UFC on ESPN: Blanchfield vs. Fiorot	March 30, 2024	3	5:00	Atlantic City, New Jersey, United States	
Win	12–3	Tabatha Ricci	Decision (split)	UFC 295	November 11, 2023	3	5:00	New York City, New York, United States	
Win	11–3	Elise Reed	Submission (rear-naked choke)	UFC Fight Night: Grasso vs. Shevchenko 2	September 16, 2023	2	3:30	Las Vegas, Nevada, United States	Performance of the Night.
Win	10–3	Emily Ducote	Decision (unanimous)	UFC Fight Night: Dern vs. Hill	May 20, 2023	3	5:00	Las Vegas, Nevada, United States	Catchweight (120 lb) bout.
Win	9–3	Cynthia Calvillo	Decision (split)	UFC 287	April 8, 2023	3	5:00	Miami, Florida, United States	
Loss	8–3	Angela Hill	Decision (unanimous)	UFC on ESPN: Vera vs. Cruz	August 13, 2022	3	5:00	San Diego, California, United States	Catchweight (120 lb) bout.
Win	8–2	Ariane Carnelossi	Decision (unanimous)	UFC 274	May 7, 2022	3	5:00	Phoenix, Arizona, United States	
Win	7–2	Loma Lookboonmee	Decision (unanimous)	UFC Fight Night: Vieira vs. Tate	November 20, 2021	3	5:00	Las Vegas, Nevada, United States	Return to Strawweight.
Loss	6–2	Luana Carolina	Decision (unanimous)	UFC Fight Night: Ladd vs. Dumont	October 16, 2021	3	5:00	Las Vegas, Nevada, United States	Flyweight debut.
Win	6–1	Silvana Gómez Juárez	Submission (armbar)	UFC Fight Night: Dern vs. Rodriguez	October 9, 2021	1	4:14	Las Vegas, Nevada, United States	Performance of the Night.
Loss	5–1	Jessica Penne	Decision (split)	UFC on ESPN: Whittaker vs. Gastelum	April 17, 2021	3	5:00	Las Vegas, Nevada, United States	
Win	5–0	Vanessa Demopoulos	Decision (majority)	LFA 94	October 30, 2020	5	5:00	Park City, Kansas, United States	Won the LFA Women's Strawweight Championship.
Win	4–0	Lindsay Garbatt	Decision (unanimous)	BTC 8: Eliminator	November 30, 2019	5	5:00	Niagara Falls, Ontario, Canada	Won the vacant BTC Strawweight Championship.
Win	3–0	Felisha Magallan	Decision (unanimous)	Combate 42	August 23, 2019	3	5:00	Lake Tahoe, Nevada, United States	Catchweight (117 lb) bout.
Win	2–0	Ashlee Mastin	TKO (submission to punches)	Sparta Combat League: Fight Night	May 18, 2019	1	2:19	Golden, Colorado, United States	
Win	1–0	Jennah Macallister	Decision (unanimous)	Sparta Combat League: Army vs. Marines 9	June 30, 2018	3	5:00	Denver, Colorado, United States	Strawweight debut.

== See also ==
- List of current UFC fighters
- List of Mexican UFC fighters
- List of female mixed martial artists
