= Ariane Carnelossi =

Brazilian mixed martial arts fighter

- Born: November 17, 1992 (age 33); Presidente Prudente, São Paulo, Brazil
- Other names: Sorriso
- Height: 5 ft 2 in (1.57 m)
- Weight: 115 lb (52 kg; 8 st 3 lb)
- Division: Strawweight
- Reach: 61 in (155 cm)
- Fighting out of: Presidente Prudente, Sao Paulo, Brazil
- Team: Inside Muay Thai
- Years active: 2007–present

Mixed martial arts record
- Total: 20
- Wins: 15
- By knockout: 9
- By submission: 2
- By decision: 3
- By disqualification: 1
- Losses: 5
- By knockout: 2
- By submission: 2
- By decision: 1

Other information
- Mixed martial arts record from Sherdog

Ariane Cristina Carnelossi (born November 17, 1992) is a Brazilian mixed martial artist who competed in the Strawweight division of the Ultimate Fighting Championship.

== Background ==
Carnelossi enjoyed soccer in her youth, having to give that up after struggling to find time between physical education college and working in a restaurant. When a muay Thai school opened right across the street from home, she immediately fell in love with martial arts. After so much time spent learning the art, Carnelossi's trainer told her how much she stood out and urged her to enter into a tournament. Eventually, this led to taking up jiu-jitsu and blending everything together in MMA, and debuting at age 21 in 2014 – coincidentally enough against fellow future UFC fighter Amanda Ribas.

== Mixed martial arts career ==
=== Early career ===
After suffering a loss in her MMA debut against Amanda Ribas at Pentagon Combat 20, Carnelossi went on a 12 bout winning streak, winning 9 of 12 via stoppage. In the process, she also captured the Batalha MMA Strawweight Championship.

=== Ultimate Fighting Championship ===
Carnelossi, as a replacement for Istela Nunes, faced Angela Hill on September 21, 2019, at UFC Fight Night 159. Carnelossi lost the fight via TKO due to a doctor's stoppage in the third round after an elbow cut Carnelossi over the left eye and rendered her unable to continue.

After more than two years away due to having surgery for Carnelossi faced Na Liang on April 24, 2021, at UFC 261. She defeated her via ground and pound TKO in the second round.

After her first UFC victory, it was revealed that Carnelossi suffered a slipped disc, the same injury on which she had surgery on in 2020, and UFC PI director of physical therapy Dr. Heather Linden had allowed her to fight with the injury. The pain however returned after the bout and she had surgery on it.

Carnelossi faced Istela Nunes on October 16, 2021, at UFC Fight Night 195. She won the fight via a rear-naked choke in round three.

Carnelossi faced Lupita Godinez on May 7, 2022 at UFC 274. She lost the fight via unanimous decision.

Carnelossi faced Piera Rodríguez on May 18, 2024, at UFC Fight Night 241. Carnelossi won the fight after Rodriguez was disqualified as a result of an illegal headbutt.

Carnelossi was scheduled to face Loma Lookboonmee on April 5, 2025 at UFC on ESPN 65. However, Carnelossi withdrew from the fight due to an ankle injury and was replaced by Istela Nunes.

Carnelossi faced Talita Alencar on November 1, 2025 at UFC Fight Night 263. She lost the fight via a rear-naked submission at the end of the third round.

Carnelossi faced Ketlen Souza on June 6, 2026 at UFC Fight Night 278. She lost the fight by knockout in the first round.

On June 18, 2026, it was reported that Carnelossi was removed from the UFC roster.

== Championships and accomplishments ==
=== Mixed martial arts ===
- Batalha MMA
  - BMMA Strawweight Championship (One time; former)

== Mixed martial arts record ==
Professional record breakdown
20 matches	15 wins	5 losses
By knockout	9	2
By submission	2	1
By decision	3	2
By disqualification	1	0

Res.	Record	Opponent	Method	Event	Date	Round	Time	Location	Notes
Loss	15–5	Ketlen Souza	KO (punches and head kick)	UFC Fight Night: Muhammad vs. Bonfim	June 6, 2026	1	1:34	Las Vegas, Nevada, United States	
Loss	15–4	Talita Alencar	Submission (rear-naked choke)	UFC Fight Night: Garcia vs. Onama	November 1, 2025	3	4:36	Las Vegas, Nevada, United States	
Win	15–3	Piera Rodríguez	DQ (headbutts)	UFC Fight Night: Barboza vs. Murphy	May 18, 2024	2	3:16	Las Vegas, Nevada, United States	
Loss	14–3	Lupita Godinez	Decision (unanimous)	UFC 274	May 7, 2022	3	5:00	Phoenix, Arizona, United States	
Win	14–2	Istela Nunes	Submission (rear-naked choke)	UFC Fight Night: Ladd vs. Dumont	October 16, 2021	3	2:57	Las Vegas, Nevada, United States	
Win	13–2	Na Liang	TKO (punches)	UFC 261	April 24, 2021	2	1:28	Jacksonville, Florida, United States	
Loss	12–2	Angela Hill	TKO (doctor stoppage)	UFC Fight Night: Rodríguez vs. Stephens	September 21, 2019	3	1:56	Mexico City, Mexico	
Win	12–1	Ketlen Souza	TKO (body kick)	Future FC 5	May 24, 2019	3	3:53	São Paulo, Brazil	
Win	11–1	Joice Mara da Silva	Decision (unanimous)	Thunder Fight 17	November 3, 2018	3	5:00	São Paulo, Brazil	Won the Thunder Fight Women's Strawweight Grand Prix.
Win	10–1	Aline Pires	KO (punch)	Thunder Fight 17	November 3, 2018	1	1:05	São Paulo, Brazil	Thunder Fight Women's Strawweight Grand Prix Semifinal.
Win	9–1	Bianca Sattelmayer	Decision (unanimous)	Batalha MMA 11	January 27, 2018	3	5:00	Bragança Paulista, Brazil	Won the vacant Batalha MMA Strawweight Championship.
Win	8–1	Kakau Costa	TKO (punches)	Max Fight 19	August 26, 2017	2	2:54	Campinas, Brazil	
Win	7–1	Gloria de Paula	Decision (unanimous)	Thunder Fight 11	August 4, 2017	3	5:00	São Paulo, Brazil	
Win	6–1	Feier Huang	TKO (punches)	Glory of Heroes 7	March 4, 2017	2	4:45	São Paulo, Brazil	
Win	5–1	Weyde Ventura	TKO (punches)	MMA Maringá Combat 4	December 17, 2016	1	0:08	Maringá, Brazil	Strawweight debut.
Win	4–1	Wellen Taynara Sobrinho	Submission (keylock)	Maringá Fight Combat 5	May 21, 2016	1	N/A	Maringá, Brazil	
Win	3–1	Ana Paula Ventrilio	TKO (punches)	Champions Fight: Costa vs. Tche	September 26, 2015	2	0:57	Presidente Prudente, Brazil	
Win	2–1	Monique Bastos	TKO (punches)	Coliseu MMA: Fight Night 1	May 2, 2015	2	0:12	Presidente Epitácio, Brazil	
Win	1–1	Bruna Brasil	TKO (punches)	Show Combat MMA 2	November 8, 2014	1	4:00	Paranavaí, Brazil	
Loss	0–1	Amanda Ribas	Submission (kneebar)	Pentagon Combat 20	September 27, 2014	1	4:14	Varginha, Brazil	Flyweight debut.

== See also ==
- List of female mixed martial artists
