= UFC Fight Night: Garcia vs. Onama =

Mixed martial arts event in 2025

- The poster for UFC Fight Night: Garcia vs. Onama
- Promotion: Ultimate Fighting Championship
- Date: November 1, 2025
- Venue: UFC Apex
- City: Enterprise, Nevada, United States
- Attendance: Not announced

Event chronology
UFC 321: Aspinall vs. Gane	UFC Fight Night: Garcia vs. Onama	UFC Fight Night: Bonfim vs. Brown

UFC Fight Night: Garcia vs. Onama (also known as UFC Fight Night 263, UFC Vegas 110 and UFC on ESPN+ 121) was a mixed martial arts event produced by the Ultimate Fighting Championship that took place on November 1, 2025, at the UFC Apex in Enterprise, Nevada, part of the Las Vegas Valley, United States.

== Background ==
A featherweight bout between Steve Garcia and David Onama headlined the event.

A heavyweight bout between former LFA Heavyweight Champion Waldo Cortes-Acosta and 2022 PFL Heavyweight Tournament winner Ante Delija was initially expected to serve as the event headliner, but was later withdrawn from that position for unspecified reasons.

A middleweight bout between Nick Klein and undefeated promotional newcomer Donte Johnson was scheduled for this event. However, Klein withdrew from the fight for unknown reasons and was replaced by Sedriques Dumas.

A bantamweight bout between former LFA Bantamweight Champions Miles Johns and Muin Gafurov was scheduled for this event. However, Gafurov withdrew for undisclosed reasons, and Johns was subsequently rescheduled to face a new opponent one week later at UFC Fight Night: Bonfim vs. Brown.

A flyweight bout between Rafael Estevam and Allan Nascimento was scheduled for this event. However, Estevam withdrew for undisclosed reasons and was replaced by Cody Durden in a 130 lb catchweight bout.

== Results ==
Main card (ESPN+)
Weight class				Method	Round	Time	Notes
Featherweight	Steve Garcia	def.	David Onama	TKO (punches)	1	3:34
Heavyweight	Waldo Cortes-Acosta	def.	Ante Delija	KO (punches)	1	3:59
Welterweight	Jeremiah Wells	def.	Themba Gorimbo	Decision (unanimous) (29–28, 29–28, 29–28)	3	5:00
Featherweight	Yadier del Valle	def.	Isaac Dulgarian	Submission (rear-naked choke)	1	3:41
Welterweight	Charles Radtke	def.	Daniel Frunza	Submission (rear-naked choke)	3	4:29
Catchweight (130 lb)	Allan Nascimento	def.	Cody Durden	Submission (anaconda choke)	2	3:13
Preliminary card (ESPN+)
Light Heavyweight	Billy Elekana	def.	Kevin Christian	Technical Submission (rear-naked choke)	1	3:33
Bantamweight	Timothy Cuamba	def.	Lee Chang-ho	Decision (unanimous) (29–28, 29–28, 29–28)	3	5:00
Middleweight	Donte Johnson	def.	Sedriques Dumas	Submission (ninja choke)	2	1:25
Women's Bantamweight	Norma Dumont	def.	Ketlen Vieira	Decision (split) (29–28, 28–29, 29–28)	3	5:00
Women's Strawweight	Alice Ardelean	def.	Montserrat Ruiz	Decision (unanimous) (30–27, 30–27, 30–27)	3	5:00
Welterweight	Ko Seok-hyeon	def.	Philip Rowe	Decision (unanimous) (30–26, 30–27, 30–27)	3	5:00
Women's Strawweight	Talita Alencar	def.	Ariane Carnelossi	Submission (rear-naked choke)	3	4:36

== Bonus awards ==
The following fighters received $50,000 bonuses.

- Fight of the Night: No bonus awarded.
- Performance of the Night: Steve Garcia, Waldo Cortes-Acosta, Allan Nascimento, and Donte Johnson

== Isaac Dulgarian's betting scandal ==
On November 3, two days after the conclusion of the event, the UFC released Isaac Dulgarian because of his suspicious activity in his bout against Yadier del Valle. Unusual betting activity on the contest was reported a few hours before the event, as Dulgarian dropped from a -250 favorite to -154 just prior to fight time, according to BestFightOdds.com. He also performed poorly and showed questionable defense during his first-round loss. The promotion released a statement:

Like many professional sports organizations, UFC works with an independent betting integrity service to monitor wagering activity on our events. Our betting integrity partner, IC360, monitors wagering on every UFC event and is conducting a thorough review of the facts surrounding the Dulgarian vs. del Valle bout on Saturday, November 1. We take these allegations very seriously, and along with the health and safety of our fighters, nothing is more important than the integrity of our sport.

UFC CEO Dana White later announced that the organization called the FBI and was cooperating with them as part of the investigation. On November 13, Dulgarian was temporarily suspended by the Nevada Athletic Commission, who will vote on extending that suspension six days later on their monthly meeting. There’s a second measure on the docket with the commission also voting on withholding his purse from the fight as well.

== See also ==
- 2025 in UFC
- List of current UFC fighters
- List of UFC events
