= UFC on ESPN: Emmett vs. Murphy =

Mixed martial arts event in 2025

- The poster for UFC on ESPN: Emmett vs. Murphy
- Promotion: Ultimate Fighting Championship
- Date: April 5, 2025
- Venue: UFC Apex
- City: Enterprise, Nevada, United States
- Attendance: Not announced

Event chronology
| UFC on ESPN: Moreno vs. Erceg | UFC on ESPN: Emmett vs. Murphy | UFC 314: Volkanovski vs. Lopes |

UFC on ESPN: Emmett vs. Murphy (also known as UFC on ESPN 65 and UFC Vegas 105) was a mixed martial arts event produced by the Ultimate Fighting Championship that took place on April 5, 2025, at the UFC Apex in Enterprise, Nevada, part of the Las Vegas Valley, United States.

== Background ==
A featherweight bout between former interim UFC Featherweight Championship challenger Josh Emmett and Lerone Murphy headlined the event.

A featherweight bout between Giga Chikadze and David Onama was scheduled for this event. However, the bout was moved to UFC on ESPN: Machado Garry vs. Prates for unknown reasons.

A women's strawweight bout between Ariane Carnelossi and Loma Lookboonmee was scheduled for this event. However, Carnelossi withdrew from the fight due to an ankle injury and was replaced by Istela Nunes.

A heavyweight bout between Kennedy Nzechukwu and Martin Buday was scheduled for this event. However, Nzechukwu was removed from the event due to injury and replaced by current LFA Light Heavyweight Champion Uran Satybaldiev.

Daniel Santos failed to make an appearance at the weigh-ins, so his bantamweight bout with Davey Grant was cancelled due to medical issues.

In addition, at the weigh-ins, Cortavious Romious weighed in at 139.5 pounds, three and a half pounds over the bantamweight non-title fight limit. The bout proceeded at catchweight and Romious was fined 20 percent of his purse which went to his opponent Lee Chang-ho.

== Results ==
Main card (ESPN / ESPN+)
| Weight class | | | | Method | Round | Time | Notes |
|---|---|---|---|---|---|---|---|
| Featherweight | Lerone Murphy | def. | Josh Emmett | Decision (unanimous) (48–47, 48–47, 49–46) | 5 | 5:00 |
| Featherweight | Pat Sabatini | def. | Joanderson Brito | Decision (unanimous) (30–26, 30–26, 30–27) | 3 | 5:00 |
| Catchweight (139.5 lb) | Lee Chang-ho | def. | Cortavious Romious | TKO (punches and elbows) | 2 | 3:48 |
| Middleweight | Brad Tavares | def. | Gerald Meerschaert | Decision (unanimous) (29–28, 29–28, 29–28) | 3 | 5:00 |
| Flyweight | Ode' Osbourne | def. | Luis Gurule | TKO (punches) | 2 | 1:54 |
| Middleweight | Torrez Finney | def. | Robert Valentin | Decision (split) (27–30, 29–28, 29–28) | 3 | 5:00 |
Preliminary card (ESPN / ESPN+)
| Women's Flyweight | Dione Barbosa | def. | Diana Belbiţă | Submission (arm-triangle choke) | 1 | 4:13 |
| Welterweight | Rhys McKee | def. | Daniel Frunza | TKO (doctor stoppage) | 1 | 5:00 |
| Women's Strawweight | Loma Lookboonmee | def. | Istela Nunes | Decision (unanimous) (30–27, 29–28, 29–28) | 3 | 5:00 |
| Bantamweight | Victor Henry | def. | Pedro Falcão | Decision (unanimous) (29–28, 29–28, 28–28) | 3 | 5:00 |
| Heavyweight | Martin Buday | def. | Uran Satybaldiev | Decision (unanimous) (29–28, 29–28, 29–28) | 3 | 5:00 |
| Women's Strawweight | Talita Alencar | def. | Vanessa Demopoulos | Decision (unanimous) (30–26, 30–27, 30–27) | 3 | 5:00 |

== Bonus awards ==
The following fighters received $50,000 bonuses.

- Fight of the Night: No bonus awarded.
- Performance of the Night: Lee Chang-ho, Ode' Osbourne, Dione Barbosa, and Rhys McKee

== See also ==
- 2025 in UFC
- List of current UFC fighters
- List of UFC events
