= Sam Hughes (fighter) =

American mixed martial arts fighter (born 1992)

- Born: Sam Kristen Hughes; June 28, 1992 (age 34); Davenport, Iowa, U.S.
- Other names: Sampage
- Height: 5 ft 5 in (1.65 m)
- Weight: 115 lb (52 kg; 8 st 3 lb)
- Division: Strawweight
- Reach: 64 in (163 cm)
- Fighting out of: Everett, Washington, U.S.
- Team: Catalyst MMA (2015–2021); Fortis MMA (2021–present)
- Rank: Blue belt in Brazilian jiu-jitsu
- Years active: 2019–present

Mixed martial arts record
- Total: 18
- Wins: 11
- By knockout: 2
- By submission: 4
- By decision: 5
- Losses: 7
- By knockout: 1
- By submission: 1
- By decision: 5

Other information
- Mixed martial arts record from Sherdog

Sam Kristen Hughes (born June 28, 1992) is an American mixed martial artist who is currently competing in the women's Strawweight division of the Ultimate Fighting Championship (UFC). As of October 31, 2026, she is #15 in the Meta UFC women's strawweight rankings.

== Background ==
Hughes grew up with three older brothers in South Carolina, where she also ran track at Dutch Fork High School. At Wofford College for her undergraduate studies in accounting and finance, she ran track and field and cross country at NCAA Division I level. She continued competing in track when she made the move to the University of South Carolina to pursue her masters in Sports Management. But after graduation, Hughes took a job in the finance world, which took her to Seattle. A friend invited her to Catalyst Fight House, in Everett, Washington and Hughes embarked on her amateur career in 2016 after a few months training at Catalyst. Hughes turned pro in 2019, due to her last amateur opponent, Melanie McIntyre, who after losing to Hughes, wanted a rematch as a pro. However, McIntyre pulled out of the fight and Hughes wound up making her debut a month later.

== Mixed martial arts career ==
=== Early career ===
Making her MMA debut at COGA 62 Supreme Showdown 4, she defeated Kayla Frajman via rear-naked choke in the first round. Hughes would collect two more stoppage victories, one by second round TKO and the other by first round armbar submission.

In her debut fight for Legacy Fighting Alliance at LFA 81, she took on Lisa Mauldin and defeated her via unanimous decision.

Hughes faced Vanessa Demopoulos for the inaugural LFA Women's Strawweight Championship on July 17, 2020 at LFA 85. She lost the bout after being choked unconscious in the 4th round via inverted triangle choke.

Hughes faced Danielle Hindley on October 16, 202 at LFA 93. She won the bout, chocking Hindley unconscious via guillotine choke at the end of the first round.

=== Ultimate Fighting Championship ===
Replacing Angela Hill who tested positive for COVID-19, Hughes signed with the UFC and faced Tecia Torres. She lost the fight via doctor stoppage between round one and two after saying she couldn't see out of one of her eyes.

Hughes, as a replacement for Hannah Cifers, was expected to face Emily Whitmire on February 27, 2021 at UFC Fight Night 186. Whitmire was removed from the bout on February 14 due to undisclosed reasons, and the bout was cancelled.

Hughes faced Loma Lookboonmee on May 1, 2021 at UFC on ESPN 23. She lost the bout via unanimous decision.

Hughes was scheduled to face Lupita Godinez on October 9, 2021 at UFC Fight Night 194. However, Hughes was pulled from the bout for testing positive of Covid-19 and she was replaced by newcomer Silvana Gomez Juarez.

Hughes, as a replacement for Jessica Penne, faced Luana Pinheiro on November 20, 2021 at UFC Fight Night 198. She lost the bout via unanimous decision.

Hughes faced Istela Nunes at UFC on ESPN 34 on April 16, 2022. She won the fight via majority decision. The bout marked the last of her prevailing contract.

Hughes faced Elise Reed at UFC Fight Night 206 on May 21, 2022. She won the fight via technical knockout in round three.

Hughes faced Piera Rodríguez on October 15, 2022 at UFC Fight Night 212. She lost the bout via unanimous decision.

Hughes faced Jacqueline Amorim on April 8, 2023, at UFC 287. She won the fight by unanimous decision.

Hughes faced Yazmin Jauregui on February 24, 2024 at UFC Fight Night 237. She lost the bout by unanimous decision.

Hughes faced Victoria Dudakova on August 3, 2024 at UFC on ABC 7. She won the fight by split decision.

Hughes faced Stephanie Luciano on March 15, 2025 at UFC Fight Night 254. She won the fight by split decision.

Hughes faced Shauna Bannon on September 6, 2025 at UFC Fight Night 258. She won the fight via a rear-naked choke submission in the second round.

Hughes faced Piera Rodríguez on March 14, 2026 at UFC Fight Night 269. She lost the fight by unanimous decision.

Hughes is scheduled to face Karolina Kowalkiewicz on January 16, 2027 at UFC Fight Night 296.

== Mixed martial arts record ==
Professional record breakdown
18 matches	11 wins	7 losses
By knockout	2	1
By submission	4	1
By decision	5	5

Res.	Record	Opponent	Method	Event	Date	Round	Time	Location	Notes
Loss	11–7	Piera Rodríguez	Decision (unanimous)	UFC Fight Night: Emmett vs. Vallejos	March 14, 2026	3	5:00	Las Vegas, Nevada, United States	
Win	11–6	Shauna Bannon	Submission (rear-naked choke)	UFC Fight Night: Imavov vs. Borralho	September 6, 2025	2	1:58	Paris, France	
Win	10–6	Stephanie Luciano	Decision (split)	UFC Fight Night: Vettori vs. Dolidze 2	March 15, 2025	3	5:00	Las Vegas, Nevada, United States	
Win	9–6	Victoria Dudakova	Decision (split)	UFC on ABC: Sandhagen vs. Nurmagomedov	August 3, 2024	3	5:00	Abu Dhabi, United Arab Emirates	
Loss	8–6	Yazmin Jauregui	Decision (unanimous)	UFC Fight Night: Moreno vs. Royval 2	February 24, 2024	3	5:00	Mexico City, Mexico	
Win	8–5	Jaqueline Amorim	Decision (unanimous)	UFC 287	April 8, 2023	3	5:00	Miami, Florida, United States	
Loss	7–5	Piera Rodríguez	Decision (unanimous)	UFC Fight Night: Grasso vs. Araújo	October 15, 2022	3	5:00	Las Vegas, Nevada, United States	
Win	7–4	Elise Reed	TKO (elbow and punches)	UFC Fight Night: Holm vs. Vieira	May 21, 2022	3	3:52	Las Vegas, Nevada, United States	
Win	6–4	Istela Nunes	Decision (majority)	UFC on ESPN: Luque vs. Muhammad 2	April 16, 2022	3	5:00	Las Vegas, Nevada, United States	Nunes was deducted one point in round 3 due to an eye poke.
Loss	5–4	Luana Pinheiro	Decision (unanimous)	UFC Fight Night: Vieira vs. Tate	November 20, 2021	3	5:00	Las Vegas, Nevada, United States	
Loss	5–3	Loma Lookboonmee	Decision (unanimous)	UFC on ESPN: Reyes vs. Procházka	May 1, 2021	3	5:00	Las Vegas, Nevada, United States	
Loss	5–2	Tecia Torres	TKO (doctor stoppage)	UFC 256	December 12, 2020	1	5:00	Las Vegas, Nevada, United States	
Win	5–1	Danielle Hindley	Technical Submission (guillotine choke)	LFA 93	October 16, 2020	1	5:00	Park City, Kansas, United States	Catchweight (120 lb) bout.
Loss	4–1	Vanessa Demopoulos	Technical Submission (inverted triangle choke)	LFA 85	July 17, 2020	4	2:21	Sioux Falls, South Dakota, United States	Strawweight debut. For the inaugural LFA Women's Strawweight Championship.
Win	4–0	Lisa Mauldin	Decision (unanimous)	LFA 81	January 31, 2020	3	5:00	Costa Mesa, California, United States	
Win	3–0	Bethany Christensen	Submission (armbar)	Battle at the Bay 15	October 19, 2019	1	0:52	Anacortes, Washington, United States	
Win	2–0	Loren Benjar	TKO (knee to the body and punches)	Xtreme Knockout 46	July 13, 2019	2	1:30	Dallas, Texas, United States	Flyweight debut.
Win	1–0	Kyla Frajman	Submission (rear-naked choke)	Combat Games 62	February 23, 2019	1	1:35	Tulalip, Washington, United States	Bantamweight debut.

== See also ==
- List of current UFC fighters
- List of female mixed martial artists
