= Ketlen Souza =

Brazilian mixed martial artist

- Born: Ketlen Gabriela Da Silva Souza; 18 August 1995 (age 31); Manaus, Amazonas, Brazil
- Other names: Esquentadinha
- Height: 5 ft 3 in (1.60 m)
- Weight: 124 lb (56 kg; 8 st 12 lb)
- Division: Flyweight; Strawweight
- Style: Luta Livre
- Fighting out of: Manaus, Amazonas, Brazil
- Team: Team Felipe Rego
- Years active: 2016–present

Mixed martial arts record
- Total: 24
- Wins: 17
- By knockout: 9
- By submission: 2
- By decision: 6
- Losses: 7
- By knockout: 2
- By submission: 2
- By decision: 3

Other information
- Mixed martial arts record from Sherdog

Ketlen Gabriela Da Silva Souza (born 18 August 1995) is a Brazilian mixed martial artist who competes in the women's Strawweight division of the Ultimate Fighting Championship (UFC). She previously competed in Invicta Fighting Championships where she is a former flyweight champion.

== Mixed martial arts career ==
=== Early career ===
Souza started her professional MMA career in 2016 and mainly fought in Brazil. She amassed a record of 11–3 prior to being signed by Invicta.

In her last fight before Invicta, Souza defeated Gisele Moreira via unanimous decision for the SFT Women's Bantamweight Championship at SFT 28 on 5 August 2021.

=== Invicta Fighting Championships ===
Souza was scheduled to challenge the reigning Invicta FC Flyweight Champion Karina Rodríguez at Invicta FC 46. However, Souza withdrew from the bout four days before the event and was replaced by Daiana Torquato.

Souza made her Invicta debut on September 28, 2022, at Invicta FC 49 against Maiju Suotama. She won the fight via unanimous decision.

Souza was booked to challenge Kristina Williams for the vacant Invicta FC Flyweight Championship at Invicta FC 51 on January 18, 2023. She won the fight via unanimous decision.

=== Ultimate Fighting Championship ===
On May 2, 2023, it was announced that Souza has signed with the Ultimate Fighting Championship.

In her debut, Souza faced Karine Silva on June 3, 2023, at UFC on ESPN 46. She lost the fight by kneebar submission and suffered a knee injury in the process.

Souza faced Marnic Mann on April 27, 2024, at UFC on ESPN 55. She won the fight by unanimous decision.

Souza faced Yazmin Jauregui on September 14, 2024 at UFC 306. She won the fight via a rear-naked choke submission in the first round. This fight earned her a Performance of the Night award.

Souza faced Angela Hill on February 15, 2025 at UFC Fight Night 251. She lost the fight by split decision. 8 out of 10 media outlets scored the bout for Souza.

Souza faced Piera Rodríguez on August 2, 2025 at UFC on ESPN 71. She lost the fight via split decision.

Souza faced Bruna Brasil on February 7, 2026, at UFC Fight Night 266. She won the fight by unanimous decision.

Souza faced Ariane Carnelossi on June 6, 2026 at UFC Fight Night 278. She won the fight by knockout in the first round.

Souza faced Loopy Godínez on October 10, 2026 at UFC Fight Night 290. At the weigh-ins, Souza weighed in at 117 pounds, one pound over the women's strawweight non-title fight limit, so Souza was fined 20 percent of her individual purse which went to Godinez. She lost the fight by unanimous decision.

== Championships and accomplishments ==
=== Mixed martial arts ===
- Ultimate Fighting Championship
  - Performance of the Night (One time) vs. Yazmin Jauregui
- Invicta Fighting Championships
  - Invicta FC Flyweight Championship (One time)
- Standout Fighting Tournament
  - SFT Women's Bantamweight Championship (One time)

== Mixed martial arts record ==
Professional record breakdown
24 matches	17 wins	7 losses
By knockout	9	2
By submission	2	2
By decision	6	3

Res.	Record	Opponent	Method	Event	Date	Round	Time	Location	Notes
Loss	17–7	Loopy Godínez	Decision (unanimous)	UFC Fight Night: Allen vs. Duncan	October 10, 2026	3	5:00	Las Vegas, Nevada, United States	Catchweight (117 lb) bout; Souza missed weight.
Win	17–6	Ariane Carnelossi	KO (punches and head kick)	UFC Fight Night: Muhammad vs. Bonfim	June 6, 2026	1	1:34	Las Vegas, Nevada, United States	
Win	16–6	Bruna Brasil	Decision (unanimous)	UFC Fight Night: Bautista vs. Oliveira	February 7, 2026	3	5:00	Las Vegas, Nevada, United States	
Loss	15–6	Piera Rodríguez	Decision (split)	UFC on ESPN: Taira vs. Park	August 2, 2025	3	5:00	Las Vegas, Nevada, United States	
Loss	15–5	Angela Hill	Decision (split)	UFC Fight Night: Cannonier vs. Rodrigues	February 15, 2025	3	5:00	Las Vegas, Nevada, United States	
Win	15–4	Yazmin Jauregui	Technical Submission (rear-naked choke)	UFC 306	September 14, 2024	1	3:02	Las Vegas, Nevada, United States	Performance of the Night.
Win	14–4	Marnic Mann	Decision (unanimous)	UFC on ESPN: Nicolau vs. Perez	April 27, 2024	3	5:00	Las Vegas, Nevada, United States	Return to Strawweight.
Loss	13–4	Karine Silva	Submission (kneebar)	UFC on ESPN: Kara-France vs. Albazi	June 3, 2023	1	1:45	Las Vegas, Nevada, United States	
Win	13–3	Kristina Williams	Decision (unanimous)	Invicta FC 51	January 18, 2023	5	5:00	Denver, Colorado, United States	Won the vacant Invicta FC Flyweight Championship.
Win	12–3	Maiju Suotama	Decision (unanimous)	Invicta FC 49	September 28, 2022	3	5:00	Hinton, Oklahoma, United States	Return to Flyweight.
Win	11–3	Gisele Moreira	Decision (unanimous)	Standout Fighting Tournament 28	August 5, 2021	5	5:00	São Paulo, Brazil	Won the SFT Women's Bantamweight Championship.
Win	10–3	Joane Milen	TKO (punches)	Star Combat 1	May 29, 2021	2	2:03	Manaus, Brazil	
Win	9–3	Erianny Castaneda	TKO (retirement)	Silva Combat Fight 3	May 14, 2021	2	5:00	Manaus, Brazil	Flyweight debut.
Loss	8–3	Dayane de Souza Cardoso	KO (punches)	Mr. Cage 42	September 4, 2020	1	1:20	Manaus, Brazil	Lost the Mr. Cage Strawweight Championship.
Loss	8–2	Ariane Carnelossi	TKO (body kick)	Future FC 5	May 24, 2019	3	3:53	São Paulo, Brazil	
Win	8–1	Jessica Luanna	TKO (punches)	Mr. Cage vs. Rei da Selva Combat 1	March 16, 2019	2	2:24	Manaus, Brazil	Defended the Mr. Cage Strawweight Championship.
Win	7–1	Erilene Rayla Nascimento	TKO (punches)	Mr. Cage 35	July 28, 2018	5	2:40	Manaus, Brazil	Defended the Mr. Cage Strawweight Championship.
Loss	6–1	Fabiulane Melo	Submission (armbar)	Coari Champions 1	March 31, 2018	1	1:56	Coari, Brazil	
Win	6–0	Andréia Cerdeira	Submission (rear-naked choke)	Mr. Cage 34	March 10, 2018	2	2:50	Manaus, Brazil	Won the vacant Mr. Cage Strawweight Championship.
Win	5–0	Paula Lira Pontes	TKO (punches)	Back Fish MMA 2	December 21, 2017	1	2:55	Manaus, Brazil	
Win	4–0	Davina Maciel	TKO (punches)	Mr. Cage 29	May 25, 2017	1	0:59	Manaus, Brazil	
Win	3–0	Jamily Solarth	TKO (punches)	Luta Tribal 1	July 8, 2017	1	1:36	Manaus, Brazil	
Win	2–0	Erilene Rayla Nascimento	Decision (unanimous)	Jovem Pan Fight Night 1	May 18, 2017	3	5:00	Manaus, Brazil	
Win	1–0	Roberta Camila Rocha	TKO (punches)	Arena Fight Championship 2	December 10, 2016	1	4:00	Coari, Brazil	Strawweight debut.

== See also ==
- List of current UFC fighters
- List of female mixed martial artists
