= Piera Rodríguez =

Venezuelan mixed martial artist (born 1992)

- Born: Pierangela Rodríguez Giunta; November 11, 1992 (age 33); Maracaibo, Zulia, Venezuela
- Other names: La Fiera
- Height: 5 ft 3 in (1.60 m)
- Weight: 115 lb (52 kg; 8 st 3 lb)
- Division: Strawweight
- Reach: 63 in (160 cm)
- Fighting out of: Maracaibo, Venezuela
- Team: Black House MMA; Lilius Barnatt Martial Arts; Xtreme Couture
- Years active: 2017–present

Mixed martial arts record
- Total: 15
- Wins: 13
- By knockout: 5
- By decision: 8
- Losses: 2
- By submission: 1
- By disqualification: 1

Other information
- Mixed martial arts record from Sherdog

Pierangela Rodríguez Giunta (born November 11, 1992) is a Venezuelan mixed martial artist. She currently competes in the women's strawweight division of the Ultimate Fighting Championship. She previously competed in Legacy Fighting Alliance, where she is a former LFA Women's Strawweight Champion. As of October 31, 2026, she is #7 in the Meta UFC women's strawweight rankings.

== Background ==
Rodríguez was born in Maracaibo, Venezuela, before raised in Ciudad Ojeda. She started boxing while she was in college, when she moved to Panama and began competing in amateur boxing alongside working and training in Brazilian jiu-jitsu. After her initial successes, Rodríguez decided to move to Málaga, Spain to train as a carrer, while making ends meet as a waitress, pizza delivery driver, and nightclub security guard.

== Mixed martial arts career ==
=== Early career ===
Rodríguez started her professional career in 2017, at the regional circuit in Panama and Spain, amassed an undefeated record at 5–0, before her fighting at Legacy Fighting Alliance.

=== Legacy Fighting Alliance ===
Rodríguez competed for the vacant LFA Women's Strawweight Championship against Svetlana Gotsyk on April 23, 2021, at LFA 105. She won the title via technical knockout in round five.

=== Dana White's Contender Series ===
Rodríguez was invited to the season 5 of Dana White's Contender Series and faced Valesca Machado on October 19, 2021. She won the fight via unanimous decision and earned the UFC contract.

=== Ultimate Fighting Championship ===
Rodríguez made her UFC debut against Kay Hansen on April 9, 2022, at UFC 273. At the weigh-ins, Hansen weighed in at 118.5 pounds, 2.5 pounds over the strawweight non-title fight limit. The bout proceeded at a catchweight and she forfeited 20% of her purse which went to Rodríguez. She won the fight via unanimous decision.

Rodríguez faced Sam Hughes on October 15, 2022, at UFC Fight Night 212. She won the fight via unanimous decision.

Rodríguez faced Gillian Robertson on April 15, 2023, at UFC on ESPN 44. She lost the fight via an armbar in round two.

Rodríguez was scheduled to face Cynthia Calvillo on April 6, 2024, at UFC Fight Night 240. At the weigh-ins, Calvillo weighed in at 119 pounds, three pounds over the strawweight non-title fight limit. As a result, her bout with Rodríguez was cancelled.

Rodríguez faced Ariane Carnelossi on May 18, 2024, at UFC Fight Night 241. She lost the fight by a disqualification as a result of an illegal headbutt.

Rodríguez faced Josefine Lindgren Knutsson on December 14, 2024, at UFC on ESPN 63. She won the fight via unanimous decision.

Rodríguez faced Ketlen Souza on August 2, 2025 at UFC on ESPN 71. She won the fight via split decision.

Rodríguez faced Sam Hughes in the rematch on March 14, 2026 at UFC Fight Night 269. She won the fight by unanimous decision.

Rodríguez faced Talita Alencar on October 31, 2026, at UFC Fight Night 292. She won the fight by unanimous decision.

== Championships and accomplishments ==
- Ultimate Fighting Championship
  - Highest takedown accuracy percentage in UFC Women's Strawweight division history (59.1%)
- Legacy Fighting Alliance
  - LFA Women's Strawweight Championship (One time)

== Mixed martial arts record ==
Professional record breakdown
15 matches	13 wins	2 losses
By knockout	5	0
By submission	0	1
By decision	8	0
By disqualification	0	1

Res.	Record	Opponent	Method	Event	Date	Round	Time	Location	Notes
Win	13–2	Talita Alencar	Decision (unanimous)	UFC Fight Night: Moicano vs. Nolan	October 31, 2026	3	5:00	Las Vegas, Nevada, United States	
Win	12–2	Sam Hughes	Decision (unanimous)	UFC Fight Night: Emmett vs. Vallejos	March 14, 2026	3	5:00	Las Vegas, Nevada, United States	
Win	11–2	Ketlen Souza	Decision (split)	UFC on ESPN: Taira vs. Park	August 2, 2025	3	5:00	Las Vegas, Nevada, United States	
Win	10–2	Josefine Lindgren Knutsson	Decision (unanimous)	UFC on ESPN: Covington vs. Buckley	December 14, 2024	3	5:00	Tampa, Florida, United States	
Loss	9–2	Ariane Carnelossi	DQ (headbutts)	UFC Fight Night: Barboza vs. Murphy	August 15, 2023	2	3:16	Las Vegas, Nevada, United States	
Loss	9–1	Gillian Robertson	Submission (armbar)	UFC on ESPN: Holloway vs. Allen	April 15, 2023	2	4:21	Kansas City, Missouri, United States	
Win	9–0	Sam Hughes	Decision (unanimous)	UFC Fight Night: Grasso vs. Araújo	October 16, 2022	3	5:00	Las Vegas, Nevada, United States	
Win	8–0	Kay Hansen	Decision (unanimous)	UFC 273	April 9, 2022	3	5:00	Jacksonville, Florida, United States	Catchweight (118.5 lb) bout; Hansen missed weight.
Win	7–0	Valesca Machado	Decision (unanimous)	Dana White's Contender Series 44	October 19, 2021	3	5:00	Las Vegas, Nevada, United States	
Win	6–0	Svetlana Gotsyk	TKO (punches)	LFA 105	April 23, 2021	5	1:16	Shawnee, Oklahoma, United States	Won the vacant LFA Women's Strawweight Championship.
Win	5–0	Kayla Hracho	Decision (unanimous)	Ultimate Combat Challenge 48	January 31, 2020	3	5:00	Panama City, Panama	Return to Strawweight.
Win	4–0	Yamila Sanchez	KO (punches)	Vida FC 1	September 14, 2019	2	1:27	Málaga, Spain	Flyweight debut.
Win	3–0	Carmen Virginia Arancibia	TKO (punches)	Ansgar Fighting League 17	November 24, 2018	2	2:07	Langreo, Spain	
Win	2–0	Lina Franco	Decision (unanimous)	Ultimate Combat Challenge: Fantastic Fight Night 7	August 19, 2017	3	4:41	Panama City, Panama	
Win	1–0	Karol Naranjo	TKO (doctor stoppage)	Ultimate Combat Challenge: Fantastic Fight Night 5	May 20, 2017	2	5:00	Panama City, Panama	Strawweight debut.

== See also ==
- List of current UFC fighters
- List of Dana White's Contender Series alumni
- List of female mixed martial artists
