= UFC Fight Night: Allen vs. Duncan =

Mixed martial arts event in 2026

- The poster for UFC Fight Night: Allen vs. Duncan
- Promotion: Ultimate Fighting Championship
- Date: October 10, 2026
- Venue: Meta Apex
- City: Enterprise, Nevada, United States
- Attendance: Not announced

Event chronology
UFC 332: Silva vs. Wang	UFC Fight Night: Allen vs. Duncan	UFC Fight Night: Buckley vs. Malott

UFC Fight Night: Allen vs. Duncan (also known as UFC Fight Night 290 and UFC Vegas 122) was a mixed martial arts event produced by the Ultimate Fighting Championship that took place on October 10, 2026, at the Meta Apex in Enterprise, Nevada, part of the Las Vegas Valley, United States.

== Background ==
A middleweight bout between former LFA Middleweight Champion Brendan Allen and Christian Leroy Duncan headlined the event.

A lightweight bout between Francisco Prado and Artur Minev was scheduled for the event. However, Minev withdrew for undisclosed reasons and was replaced by Ismael Bonfim.

A light heavyweight bout between Felipe Franco and Alexander Poppeck was scheduled at this event. However, Poppeck pulled out and was replaced by Brendson Ribeiro.

At the weigh-ins, three fighters missed weight:

- Ketlen Souza weighed in at 117 pounds, one pound over the women's strawweight non-title fight limit.
- Bonfim weighed in at 163.5 pounds, seven and a half pounds over the lightweight non-title fight limit.
- Ribeiro weighed in at 208.5 pounds, two and a half pounds over the light heavyweight non-title fight limit.

All bouts proceeded at catchweight. The fighters were fined a percentage of their individual purses which went to their opponents Loopy Godínez (20 percent), Prado (25 percent) and Franco (20 percent), respectively.

== Results ==
Main card (Paramount+)
Weight class				Method	Round	Time	Notes
Middleweight	Brendan Allen	def.	Christian Leroy Duncan	Submission (rear-naked choke)	5	2:46	(Note: Duncan was deducted one point in round 2 due to an eye poke.)
Lightweight	Jai Herbert	def.	Matheus Camilo	Decision (unanimous) (29–28, 29–28, 29–28)	3	5:00
Catchweight (117 lb)	Loopy Godínez	def.	Ketlen Souza	Decision (unanimous) (29–28, 29–28, 29–28)	3	5:00
Featherweight	Andre Fili	def.	Kai Kamaka III	KO (head kick)	2	0:22
Bantamweight	Otari Tanzilovi	def.	Malcolm Wellmaker	TKO (head kick and punches)	2	2:39
Preliminary card (Paramount+)
Light Heavyweight	Julius Walker	def.	Gerald Meerschaert	TKO (punches)	2	3:35
Catchweight (163.5 lb)	Francisco Prado	def.	Ismael Bonfim	TKO (elbow and punches)	1	4:23
Welterweight	Niko Price	def.	Leon Shahbazyan	TKO (punches)	1	1:58
Catchweight (208.5 lb)	Brendson Ribeiro	def.	Felipe Franco	Submission (guillotine choke)	1	1:49
Heavyweight	Allen Frye Jr.	def.	RJ Harris	KO (punches)	1	2:59
Women's Bantamweight	Alice Pereira	def.	Darya Zheleznyakova	TKO (retirement)	1	5:00
Women's Flyweight	Melissa Gatto	vs.	Ernesta Kareckaitė	Draw (majority) (29–27, 28–28, 28–28)	3	5:00	(Note: Kareckaitė was deducted one point in round 1 due to grabbing the fence.)

== Bonus awards ==
The following fighters received $100,000 bonuses. The other finishes received $25,000 additional bonuses.

- Fight of the Night: No bonus awarded.
- Performance of the Night: Brendan Allen, Andre Fili, Otari Tanzilovi, and Alice Pereira

== See also ==
- 2026 in UFC
- List of current UFC fighters
- List of UFC events
