= Jonathan Pearce (fighter) =

American mixed martial arts fighter

- Born: Jonathan Mark Pearce; May 1, 1992 (age 34); Johnson City, Tennessee, U.S.
- Other names: JSP
- Height: 5 ft 11 in (1.80 m)
- Weight: 145 lb (66 kg; 10 st 5 lb)
- Division: Lightweight; Featherweight; Bantamweight
- Reach: 71 in (180 cm)
- Fighting out of: Scottsdale, Arizona, U.S.
- Team: D-Evil MMA (until 2017); Team Oxendine (2017–present); MMA Lab (2018–2019); Fight Ready MMA & Fitness (2019–present)
- Rank: Purple belt in Brazilian Jiu-Jitsu under Casey Oxendine
- Years active: 2014–present

Mixed martial arts record
- Total: 21
- Wins: 14
- By knockout: 9
- By submission: 2
- By decision: 3
- Losses: 7
- By knockout: 1
- By submission: 4
- By decision: 2

Other information
- Mixed martial arts record from Sherdog

Jonathan Mark Pearce (born May 1, 1992) is an American mixed martial artist who competed in the Featherweight division of the Ultimate Fighting Championship.

== Background ==
Having begun wrestling at the age of 12, Pearce was a state runner-up wrestler at Science Hill High School.

In 2014, Pearce was blindsided by a disgruntled gym member, after the gym “bully” clocked him from behind after Pearce called out his ongoing rude behavior. Pearce went unconscious and had his head bashed by a heavy follow-up kick. The attack caused Pearce to suffer a broken neck, 19 broken teeth, a severed tongue, and had to undergo reconstructive jaw surgery. He still has two plates and eight screws in his face. After the incident, Pearce dropped out of college in pursuit of a professional mixed martial arts career.

== Mixed martial arts career ==
=== Early career ===
In his MMA debut at CFFC 73, he knocked out Noe Quintanilla in the third round, going on to defeat his next three opponents in Chris Wright, Anthony Morgan, and Nickalas Martino.

After going 4–0 to start his career, his fiancée called off their wedding and he would lose the next three bouts, two by first round submission. Also after the third straight loss, in 2017, Pearce went to get medicals done for his next fight and doctors discovered he had a clay-shoveler fracture of two vertebrae in his neck, likely from the 2015 attack. A clay-shoveler fracture is an avulsion in which a small piece of bone tears away from the bigger piece.

Pearce tapped out Damir Ferhatbegovic via rear-naked choke in round three at Bellator Monster Energy Fight Series: Bristol on August 19, 2017. He defeated Omar Johnson via TKO in the second round at Bellator Monster Energy Fight Series: Talladega on October 13, 2017. He would defeat his next two opponents in Nick Baker and Dedrek Sanders, both via second-round TKO.

=== Dana White's Contender Series ===
After four victories in a row, Pearce was invited to Dana White's Contender Series 19 on July 9, 2019. He took on Jacob Rosales and defeated him via TKO in the third round and securing a UFC contract.

=== Ultimate Fighting Championship ===
Pearce made his UFC debut against UFC vet Joe Lauzon, who was coming off an 18-month hiatus, at UFC on ESPN 6. He lost the fight via technical knockout in round one.

Pearce was scheduled to face Sean Woodson on November 28, 2020, at UFC on ESPN 18. However, Woodson withdrew a week before the event for unknown reasons and was replaced by Kai Kamaka III. He won the bout via TKO in the second round.

Pearce was scheduled to face Gabriel Benítez on May 1, 2021, at UFC on ESPN 23. At weigh ins, Benítez weighed in at 150.5 pounds, 4.5 pounds over the featherweight non-title limit. Pearce turned down the fight due to the weight miss and the bout was scrapped.

Pearce faced Omar Morales on September 25, 2021, at UFC 266. He won the fight via rear-naked choke in round two.

Pearce was scheduled to face Austin Lingo on February 19, 2022, at UFC Fight Night 201. However, Lingo pulled out due to undisclosed reasons, and was replaced by Christian Rodriguez. Pearce won the fight via unanimous decision.

Pearce faced Makwan Amirkhani on July 23, 2022, at UFC Fight Night 208. He won the bout via TKO in the second round. This win earned him the Performance of the Night award.

Pearce faced Darren Elkins on December 3, 2022, at UFC on ESPN 42. He won the bout via unanimous decision.

Pearce was scheduled to face Bryce Mitchell on May 6, 2023, at UFC 288. However, Pearce was forced to withdraw from the event due to injury.

Pearce faced Joanderson Brito on November 18, 2023, at UFC Fight Night 232. He lost the fight via a ninja choke submission in the second round.

Pearce faced David Onama on April 17, 2024, at UFC on ESPN 55. At the weigh-ins, Onama weighted 148.5 pounds, which was 2.5 pounds over the featherweight non-title fight limit. The bout proceeded at catchweight with Onama being fined 20% of his purse which went to Pearce. Pearce lost the fight via unanimous decision.

Pearce faced Pat Sabatini on October 12, 2024, at UFC Fight Night 244. He lost the fight via a rear-naked choke submission in the first round.

On February 27, 2025, it was reported that Pearce was removed from the UFC roster.

== Championships and accomplishments ==
- Ultimate Fighting Championship
  - Performance of the Night (One time) vs. Makwan Amirkhani
- MMA Junkie
  - 2022 Under-the-Radar Fighter of the Year

== Mixed martial arts record ==
Professional record breakdown
21 matches	14 wins	7 losses
By knockout	9	1
By submission	2	4
By decision	3	2

Res.	Record	Opponent	Method	Event	Date	Round	Time	Location	Notes
Loss	14–7	Pat Sabatini	Submission (rear-naked choke)	UFC Fight Night: Royval vs. Taira	October 12, 2024	1	4:06	Las Vegas, Nevada, United States	
Loss	14–6	David Onama	Decision (unanimous)	UFC on ESPN: Nicolau vs. Perez	April 27, 2024	3	5:00	Las Vegas, Nevada, United States	Catchweight (148.5 lb) bout; Onama missed weight.
Loss	14–5	Joanderson Brito	Submission (ninja choke)	UFC Fight Night: Allen vs. Craig	November 18, 2023	2	3:54	Las Vegas, Nevada, United States	
Win	14–4	Darren Elkins	Decision (unanimous)	UFC on ESPN: Thompson vs. Holland	December 3, 2022	3	5:00	Orlando, Florida, United States	
Win	13–4	Makwan Amirkhani	TKO (punches)	UFC Fight Night: Blaydes vs. Aspinall	July 23, 2022	2	4:10	London, England	Performance of the Night.
Win	12–4	Christian Rodriguez	Decision (unanimous)	UFC Fight Night: Walker vs. Hill	February 19, 2022	3	5:00	Las Vegas, Nevada, United States	
Win	11–4	Omar Morales	Submission (rear-naked choke)	UFC 266	September 25, 2021	2	3:31	Las Vegas, Nevada, United States	
Win	10–4	Kai Kamaka III	TKO (punches)	UFC on ESPN: Smith vs. Clark	November 28, 2020	2	4:28	Las Vegas, Nevada, United States	Return to Featherweight.
Loss	9–4	Joe Lauzon	TKO (punches)	UFC on ESPN: Reyes vs. Weidman	October 18, 2019	1	1:33	Boston, Massachusetts, United States	
Win	9–3	Jacob Rosales	TKO (punch)	Dana White's Contender Series 19	July 9, 2019	3	1:50	Las Vegas, Nevada, United States	
Win	8–3	Dedrek Sanders	TKO (doctor stoppage)	Warrior FC 140	September 21, 2018	2	5:00	Asheville, North Carolina, United States	
Win	7–3	Nick Baker	TKO (punches)	Strikefest 2	December 16, 2017	2	1:12	Gray, Tennessee, United States	Catchweight (150 lb) bout.
Win	6–3	Omar Johnson	TKO (punches)	Bellator Monster Energy Fight Series: Talladega	October 13, 2017	2	3:57	Talladega, Alabama, United States	
Win	5–3	Damir Ferhatbegović	Submission (rear-naked choke)	Bellator Monster Energy Fight Series: Bristol	August 19, 2017	3	0:43	Bristol, Tennessee, United States	Lightweight debut.
Loss	4–3	Peter Petties	Decision (unanimous)	Shogun Fights 16	April 8, 2017	3	5:00	Baltimore, Maryland, United States	Bantamweight debut.
Loss	4–2	Quinten Culpepper	Submission (toe hold)	Valor Fights 37	August 27, 2016	1	3:27	Cleveland, Tennessee, United States	
Loss	4–1	Lance Lawrence	Submission (rear-naked choke)	Valor Fights 35	June 25, 2016	1	0:24	Gray, Tennessee, United States	
Win	4–0	Nickalas Martino	TKO (elbows)	APEX Fights 10	March 19, 2016	2	2:52	Kingsport, Tennessee, United States	Catchweight (160 lb) bout.
Win	3–0	Chris Wright	TKO (punches)	Valor Fights 26	September 12, 2015	1	4:26	Blountville, Tennessee, United States	Catchweight (140 lb) bout.
Win	2–0	Anthony Morgan	Decision (unanimous)	Valor Fights 23	June 6, 2015	3	5:00	Pigeon Forge, Tennessee, United States	
Win	1–0	Noe Quintanilla	KO (knee)	Evolution Combat Sports Series 2	November 8, 2014	3	0:22	Elizabethton, Tennessee, United States	Featherweight debut.

== See also ==
- List of male mixed martial artists
