= UFC on ESPN: Luque vs. Muhammad 2 =

Mixed martial arts event in 2022

- The poster for UFC on ESPN: Luque vs. Muhammad 2
- Promotion: Ultimate Fighting Championship
- Date: April 16, 2022
- Venue: UFC Apex
- City: Enterprise, Nevada, United States
- Attendance: Not announced

Event chronology
UFC 273: Volkanovski vs. The Korean Zombie	UFC on ESPN: Luque vs. Muhammad 2	UFC Fight Night: Lemos vs. Andrade

UFC on ESPN: Luque vs. Muhammad 2 (also known as UFC on ESPN 34 and UFC Vegas 51) was a mixed martial arts event produced by the Ultimate Fighting Championship that took place on April 16, 2022, at the UFC Apex facility in Enterprise, Nevada, part of the Las Vegas Metropolitan Area, United States.

== Background ==
A welterweight rematch between Vicente Luque and Belal Muhammad headlined the event. The pair previously met at UFC 205, where Luque won the bout via first-round knockout.

A lightweight bout between Drakkar Klose and Nikolas Motta was briefly link to the event. However, Motta was removed from the event for undisclosed reasons and replaced by Brandon Jenkins.

A welterweight bout between Miguel Baeza and Dhiego Lima was scheduled for the event. However, Lima announced his retirement from competition in early February and was replaced by André Fialho.

A featherweight bout between Melsik Baghdasaryan and T.J. Laramie was originally booked for UFC 268, but Laramie had an MRSA infection and it was postponed. They were then expected to meet at this event. In turn, Baghdasaryan pulled out for unknown reasons and Laramie was matched up against Pat Sabatini.

A lightweight bout between Victor Martinez and Jordan Leavitt was scheduled for the event. However, Martinez withdrew from the event for unknown reasons and was replaced by Trey Ogden.

Uriah Hall was expected to meet André Muniz in a middleweight bout at the main card. However, on April 2, Hall withdrew due to undisclosed reasons. Muniz was also pulled after promotion wasn't able to find him a replacement.

A welterweight bout between Elizeu Zaleski dos Santos and Mounir Lazzez was expected to take place at the event. However, Zaleski dos Santos withdrew the week of the fight for personal reasons. He was replaced by Ange Loosa.

== Results ==
Main card (ESPN / ESPN+)
Weight class				Method	Round	Time	Notes
Welterweight	Belal Muhammad	def.	Vicente Luque	Decision (unanimous) (49–46, 49–46, 48–47)	5	5:00
Middleweight	Caio Borralho	def.	Gadzhi Omargadzhiev	Technical Decision (unanimous) (29–27, 29–27, 29–27)	3	3:56	(Note: Bout was stopped at 3:56 of round 3 as Borralho was deducted one point due to an accidental illegal knee which rendered Omargadzhiev unable to continue.)
Welterweight	André Fialho	def.	Miguel Baeza	TKO (punches)	1	4:39
Women's Bantamweight	Mayra Bueno Silva	def.	Wu Yanan	Decision (unanimous) (29–28, 29–28, 30–27)	3	5:00
Featherweight	Pat Sabatini	def.	T.J. Laramie	Decision (unanimous) (30–26, 30–26, 30–26)	3	5:00
Welterweight	Mounir Lazzez	def.	Ange Loosa	Decision (unanimous) (30–27, 30–27, 30–27)	3	5:00
Preliminary card (ESPN2 / ESPN+)
Heavyweight	Devin Clark	def.	William Knight	TKO (punches)	3	3:21
Women's Bantamweight	Pannie Kianzad	def.	Lina Länsberg	Decision (unanimous) (29–28, 29–28, 29–28)	3	5:00
Lightweight	Drakkar Klose	def.	Brandon Jenkins	TKO (punches)	2	0:33
Lightweight	Rafa García	def.	Jesse Ronson	Submission (rear-naked choke)	2	4:50	(Note: García was deducted one point in round 2 due to an illegal knee.)
Heavyweight	Martin Buday	def.	Chris Barnett	Technical Decision (unanimous) (30–27, 30–27, 30–27)	3	1:35	(Note: Bout was stopped at 1:35 of round 3 as Buday inadvertently elbowed Barnett in the back of the head rendering him unable to continue.)
Lightweight	Jordan Leavitt	def.	Trey Ogden	Decision (split) (28–29, 29–28, 29–28)	3	5:00
Women's Strawweight	Sam Hughes	def.	Istela Nunes	Decision (majority) (29–27, 29–27, 28–28)	3	5:00	(Note: Nunes was deducted one point in round 3 due to an eye poke.)
Bantamweight	Alateng Heili	def.	Kevin Croom	TKO (punches)	1	0:47

== Bonus awards ==
The following fighters received $50,000 bonuses.

- Fight of the Night: Mayra Bueno Silva vs. Wu Yanan
- Performance of the Night: André Fialho and Drakkar Klose

== See also ==
- List of UFC events
- List of current UFC fighters
- 2022 in UFC
