= Jordan Leavitt =

American mixed martial artist (born 1995)

- Born: June 2, 1995 (age 31); Las Vegas, Nevada, United States
- Other names: The Monkey King
- Height: 5 ft 9 in (175 cm)
- Weight: 155 lb (70 kg; 11 st 1 lb)
- Division: Lightweight
- Reach: 71 in (180 cm)
- Stance: Southpaw
- Fighting out of: Las Vegas, Nevada
- Team: Syndicate MMA
- Rank: Purple belt in Brazilian Jiu-Jitsu
- Years active: 2017–present

Mixed martial arts record
- Total: 17
- Wins: 13
- By knockout: 2
- By submission: 7
- By decision: 4
- Losses: 4
- By submission: 3
- By decision: 1

Other information
- Mixed martial arts record from Sherdog

Jordan Leavitt (/ˈlɛvɪt/; born June 2, 1995) is an American mixed martial artist who competes in the Lightweight division of the Ultimate Fighting Championship.

== Background ==
Leavitt's MMA journey began in high school as part of the wrestling team. Initially quitting during his first year, he stumbled across The Ultimate Fighter on TV and immediately fell in love with the sport, re-joining the wrestling team and competing for the next three years.

As of August 2018, Leavitt majors in political science at the University of Nevada, Las Vegas, and has dreams of law school and a career in family law. He postponed these dreams in favor of his fighting career, but with hopes to pursue law school once again after that.

== Mixed martial arts career ==
=== Early career ===
Making his MMA debut at Gladiator Challenge Fight Club, Leavitt would win his first bout after submitting Tony Martinez via Peruvian Necktie in the second round. Leavitt would go on to defeat Lucas Neufeld at Tuff N' Nuff Fight Night via unanimous decision, Roy Ostrander at Final Fighting Championship 36 via arm-triangle choke, John Walker via heel hook in round one at Gladiator Challenge Holiday Beatings, and finally Isaiah William via unanimous decision at BCM Promotions Fight Night 8 to pick up his second decision win as a professional.

In his debut promotional appearance with Legacy Fighting Alliance at LFA 85, he submitted Levion Lewis via anaconda choke in the second round.

Leavitt was invited to Dana White's Contender Series 27 on August 4, 2020. He won the fight via arm-triangle choke in the first round and was subsequently awarded a UFC contract.

=== Ultimate Fighting Championship ===
Leavitt made his UFC debut against Matt Wiman on December 5, 2020, at UFC on ESPN 19. He won the bout via slam knockout in round one. This fight earned him the Performance of the Night award.

Leavitt faced Claudio Puelles in his sophomore performance on June 5, 2021, at UFC Fight Night 189. He lost the bout via unanimous decision.

Leavitt faced Matt Sayles on December 18, 2021, at UFC Fight Night 199. He won the bout via submission due to an inverted triangle choke in the second round, being only the third fighter in UFC history to do so.

Leavitt was scheduled to face Victor Martinez on April 16, 2022, at UFC on ESPN 34. However, Martinez withdrew from the event for unknown reasons and was replaced by promotional newcomer Trey Ogden. Leavitt won the bout via split decision.

Leavitt next faced Paddy Pimblett on July 23, 2022, at UFC Fight Night 208. Leavitt lost the bout via rear-naked choke in the second round.

Leavitt faced Victor Martinez on February 25, 2023, at UFC Fight Night 220. He won the fight via technical knockout in round one. This win earned him the Performance of the Night bonus.

Leavitt was scheduled to face Elves Brenner on July 1, 2023, at UFC on ESPN 48. However, the fight did not happen when Leavitt withdrew from the bout.

Leavitt faced Chase Hooper on November 18, 2023, at UFC Fight Night 232. He lost the fight via a rear-naked choke submission in the first round.

Leavitt was scheduled to face Abdul-Kareem Al-Selwady on February 1, 2025 at UFC Fight Night 250. However, Leavitt withdrew for unknown reasons and was replaced by Bolaji Oki.

Leavitt faced The Ultimate Fighter 31 Lightweight Tournament Winner Kurt Holobaugh on May 31, 2025 at UFC on ESPN 68. He won the fight via an anaconda choke submission in the first round. This fight earned him another Performance of the Night award.

In his move to the featherweight division, Leavitt faced Yadier del Valle on February 21, 2026 at UFC Fight Night 267. He won the fight by unanimous decision.

Leavitt was scheduled to face Joanderson Brito on May 16, 2026 at UFC Fight Night 276. However, for undisclosed reasons, the bout was moved to UFC Fight Night 278 on June 6, 2026. Leavitt lost the fight via a front choke submission in the first round.

== Professional grappling career ==
Leavitt competed against Ethan Crelinsten at Pit Submission Series 5 on May 30, 2024. He lost the match by decision.

== Personal life ==
Leavitt and his wife got married in 2019. Their daughter was born on November 16, 2023.

== Championships and accomplishments ==
- Ultimate Fighting Championship
  - Performance of the Night (Three times) vs. Matt Wiman, Victor Martinez and Kurt Holobaugh
  - UFC Honors Awards
    - 2020: Fan's Choice Debut of the Year Nominee vs. Matt Wiman
  - UFC.com Awards
    - 2020: Ranked #8 Knockout of the Year vs. Matt Wiman

== Mixed martial arts record ==
Professional record breakdown
| 17 matches | 13 wins | 4 losses |
| By knockout | 2 | 0 |
| By submission | 7 | 3 |
| By decision | 4 | 1 |

| Res. | Record | Opponent | Method | Event | Date | Round | Time | Location | Notes |
|---|---|---|---|---|---|---|---|---|---|
| Loss | 13–4 | Joanderson Brito | Submission (ninja choke) | UFC Fight Night: Muhammad vs. Bonfim | June 6, 2026 | 1 | 4:19 | Las Vegas, Nevada, United States | |
| Win | 13–3 | Yadier del Valle | Decision (unanimous) | UFC Fight Night: Strickland vs. Hernandez | February 21, 2026 | 3 | 5:00 | Houston, Texas, United States | Return to Featherweight. |
| Win | 12–3 | Kurt Holobaugh | Technical Submission (anaconda choke) | UFC on ESPN: Gamrot vs. Klein | May 31, 2025 | 1 | 1:39 | Las Vegas, Nevada, United States | Performance of the Night. |
| Loss | 11–3 | Chase Hooper | Submission (rear-naked choke) | UFC Fight Night: Allen vs. Craig | November 18, 2023 | 1 | 2:58 | Las Vegas, Nevada, United States | |
| Win | 11–2 | Victor Martinez | TKO (elbows and knees) | UFC Fight Night: Muniz vs. Allen | February 25, 2023 | 1 | 2:27 | Las Vegas, Nevada, United States | Performance of the Night. |
| Loss | 10–2 | Paddy Pimblett | Submission (rear-naked choke) | UFC Fight Night: Blaydes vs. Aspinall | July 23, 2022 | 2 | 2:46 | London, England | |
| Win | 10–1 | Trey Ogden | Decision (split) | UFC on ESPN: Luque vs. Muhammad 2 | April 16, 2022 | 3 | 5:00 | Las Vegas, Nevada, United States | |
| Win | 9–1 | Matt Sayles | Submission (inverted triangle choke) | UFC Fight Night: Lewis vs. Daukaus | December 18, 2021 | 2 | 2:05 | Las Vegas, Nevada, United States | |
| Loss | 8–1 | Claudio Puelles | Decision (unanimous) | UFC Fight Night: Rozenstruik vs. Sakai | June 5, 2021 | 3 | 5:00 | Las Vegas, Nevada, United States | |
| Win | 8–0 | Matt Wiman | KO (slam) | UFC on ESPN: Hermansson vs. Vettori | December 5, 2020 | 1 | 0:22 | Las Vegas, Nevada, United States | Performance of the Night. |
| Win | 7–0 | Jose Flores | Submission (arm-triangle choke) | Dana White's Contender Series 27 | August 4, 2020 | 1 | 4:15 | Las Vegas, Nevada, United States | |
| Win | 6–0 | Leivon Lewis | Submission (anaconda choke) | LFA 85 | July 17, 2020 | 2 | 2:01 | Sioux Falls, South Dakota, United States | |
| Win | 5–0 | Izzy William | Decision (unanimous) | BCM Promotions: Fight Night 8 | February 22, 2020 | 3 | 5:00 | Mansfield, Ohio, United States | Lightweight debut. |
| Win | 4–0 | Johnny Walker | Submission (heel hook) | Gladiator Challenge: Holiday Beatings | December 14, 2019 | 1 | 0:17 | Hemet, California, United States | |
| Win | 3–0 | Ray Ostrander | Submission (arm-triangle choke) | Final Fight Championship 36 | May 9, 2019 | 1 | 1:30 | Las Vegas, Nevada, United States | |
| Win | 2–0 | Lucas Neufeld | Decision (unanimous) | Tuff-N-Uff: Fight Night | September 14, 2018 | 3 | 5:00 | Las Vegas, Nevada, United States | |
| Win | 1–0 | Tony Martinez | Submission (Peruvian necktie) | Gladiator Challenge: Fight Club | October 7, 2017 | 2 | 2:43 | El Cajon, California, United States | Featherweight debut. |

== See also ==
- List of current UFC fighters
- List of Dana White's Contender Series alumni
- List of male mixed martial artists
