= Santa Helena, Maranhão =

Santa Helena
- Municipality
- The Municipality of Santa Helena
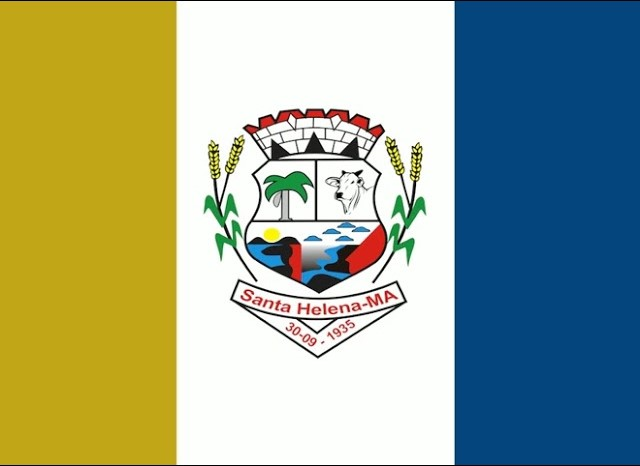
- Flag
- Nickname: "Pérola do Turí" (Pearl of Turi)
- Location of Santa Helena in the State of Maranhão
- Coordinates: 02°13′51″S 45°18′00″W
- Country: Brazil
- Region: Northeast
- State: Maranhão
- Founded: September 30, 1935

Government
  - Mayor: Helena Maria Lobato Pavão (PTB)

Area
  - Total: 2,308.403 km^{2} (891.279 sq mi)

Population (2020)
  - Total: 42,483
  - Density: 18.404/km^{2} (47.665/sq mi)
- Time zone: UTC−3 (BRT)
- HDI (2000): 0.600 – medium
- Website: www.santahelena.ma.gov.br

Santa Helena is a municipality in the state of Maranhão in the Northeast region of Brazil.

The municipality contains a small part of the Baixada Maranhense Environmental Protection Area, a 1,775,035.6-hectare (4,386,208-acre) sustainable use conservation unit created in 1991 that has been a Ramsar Site since 2000.

== See also ==
- List of municipalities in Maranhão
