= Carutapera =

Municipality in Maranhão, Brazil

- Municipality
- The Municipality of Carutapera
- Flag

- Location of Carutapera
- Coordinates: 01°11′42″S 46°01′12″W
- Country: Brazil
- Region: Northeast
- State: Maranhão
- Founded: June 3, 1935

Government
  - Mayor: Airton Marques Silva

Area
  - Total: 1,255.555 km^{2} (484.772 sq mi)

Population (2020)
  - Total: 23,952
  - Density: 16.4/km^{2} (42/sq mi)
- Time zone: UTC−3 (BRT)
- HDI (2000): 0.571 – medium
- Website: www.carutapera.ma.gov.br

Carutapera is the northernmost city in the Brazilian state of Maranhão.

== History ==
In 1861, Firmino Pantoja and his wife, Augusta Pantoja, acquiring land from Manoel Rodrigues Leite Chaves, on the right bank of the Arapiranga River, founded the village that was called Carutapera. The toponym, of Tupi origin, means abandoned village. The population progressed rapidly. In 1886, it was elevated to the category of village later extinct and its territory annexed to the municipality of Turiaçu. In 1935, the autonomy of Carutapera was re-established[²].

== Subdivisions ==
Sede

Where the largest urban concentration is found, it is called the headquarters, which is formed by twelve different neighborhoods:

- Amim Quemel
- Aparecida
- Boa Esperança
- Bom Jesus
- Centro
- Perpétuo Socorro
- Santo Antônio
- Santa Luzia
- Santa Rita
- São Benedito
- São José
- Substação

Interior

The Interior is composed of the rural area, with small and large villages.

- Arapiranga
- Bajaco
- Caju
- Canadá
- Cana Verde
- Cearazinho
- Estiva
- Europa
- Forquilha
- Iraque
- Salvamento
- Manaus da Beira
- Parada Fortaleza
- Pindoval
- São Lourenço
- Timbotiua

== Tourism ==
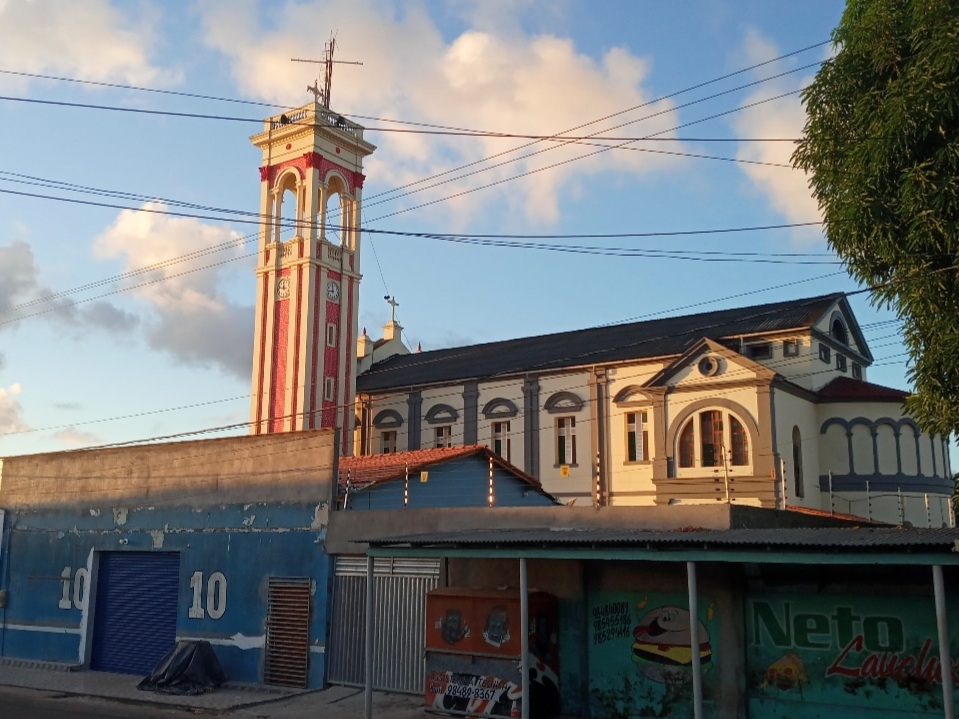
Basílica Menor de São Sebastião

- Basilica of San Sebastian
- Apolônio River
- Seu Domingos River
- São Pedro Beach

=== Feast of Saint Sebastian ===
The feast of Saint Sebastian is an annual devotion, held by the parish of Saint Sebastian.
