= UFC on ESPN: Vera vs. Cruz =

2022 mixed martial arts event

- The poster for UFC on ESPN: Vera vs. Cruz
- Promotion: Ultimate Fighting Championship
- Date: August 13, 2022
- Venue: Pechanga Arena
- City: San Diego, California, United States
- Attendance: 12,804
- Total gate: $1,735,904.91

Event chronology
UFC on ESPN: Santos vs. Hill	UFC on ESPN: Vera vs. Cruz	UFC 278: Usman vs. Edwards 2

UFC on ESPN: Vera vs. Cruz (also known as UFC on ESPN 41) was a mixed martial arts event produced by the Ultimate Fighting Championship that took place on August 13, 2022, at Pechanga Arena in San Diego, California, United States.

== Background ==
A bantamweight bout between Marlon Vera and former two-time UFC Bantamweight Champion (also former WEC Bantamweight Champion) Dominick Cruz headlined the event.

Viviane Araújo was expected to face Alexa Grasso in a women's flyweight bout. The pair was previously scheduled to meet at UFC 270, but Araújo was forced to pull out from the event due to injury. In turn, Grasso pulled out due to visa issues and the bout was scrapped.

A women's strawweight bout between Yazmin Jauregui and Istela Nunes was expected to take place at the event. However, Nunes withdrew due to injury and was replaced by Iasmin Lucindo.

Cynthia Calvillo and Nina Nunes were previously scheduled to meet in a women's flyweight bout at UFC on ESPN: dos Anjos vs. Fiziev. In turn, Nunes fell ill on the day of that event and the bout was postponed to this date.

A flyweight bout between Malcolm Gordon and Allan Nascimento was expected to take place at this event. However, Gordon pulled out in late July due to an undisclosed injury and the bout was scrapped.

A women's bantamweight bout featuring Aspen Ladd and 2004 Olympic silver medalist in wrestling and former UFC Women's Bantamweight Championship challenger Sara McMann was expected to take place at the event. They were supposed to fight at UFC on ESPN: Poirier vs. Hooker in June 2020, but Ladd was forced to withdraw from that event after tearing both her anterior cruciate ligament (ACL) and medial collateral ligament (MCL) in training. The pairing was once again scrapped as Ladd tested positive for COVID-19 this time. They were rescheduled for UFC Fight Night: Sandhagen vs. Song on September 17.

A bantamweight bout between Youssef Zalal and Cristian Quiñonez was expected to take the event. However, Quiñonez was pulled from the fight due to alleged visa issues which restricted his travel and was replaced by Da'Mon Blackshear.

A welterweight bout between Jason Witt and Josh Quinlan was expected to take place one week prior at UFC on ESPN: Santos vs. Hill, but it was moved to this event after Quinlan was pulled for an atypical drug finding: long-term metabolite (or M3 metabolite) of the steroid dehydrochloromethyltestosterone (DHCMT) in his urine sample. They met in a catchweight of 180 pounds.

Former KSW Women's Flyweight Champion Ariane Lipski and Priscila Cachoeira were previously scheduled to meet in a flyweight bout at UFC Fight Night: Błachowicz vs. Jacaré, but the fight was cancelled after Cachoeira was suspended due to use of a diuretic. They were then expected to meet at UFC on ESPN: Santos vs. Hill, but after Lipski missed weight and was not medically cleared, they were rescheduled for this event in a bantamweight bout.

== Results ==
Main card (ESPN / ESPN+)
Weight class				Method	Round	Time	Notes
Bantamweight	Marlon Vera	def.	Dominick Cruz	KO (head kick)	4	2:17
Featherweight	Nate Landwehr	def.	David Onama	Decision (majority) (28–28, 29–27, 29–27)	3	5:00
Women's Strawweight	Yazmin Jauregui	def.	Iasmin Lucindo	Decision (unanimous) (30–27, 29–28, 29–28)	3	5:00
Light Heavyweight	Azamat Murzakanov	def.	Devin Clark	TKO (punches)	3	1:18
Women's Bantamweight	Priscila Cachoeira	def.	Ariane Lipski	TKO (punches)	1	1:05
Middleweight	Gerald Meerschaert	def.	Bruno Silva	Submission (guillotine choke)	3	1:39
Preliminary card (ESPN / ESPN+)
Catchweight (120 lb)	Angela Hill	def.	Lupita Godinez	Decision (unanimous) (29–28, 29–28, 29–28)	3	5:00
Heavyweight	Martin Buday	def.	Łukasz Brzeski	Decision (split) (29–28, 28–29, 29–28)	3	5:00
Women's Flyweight	Nina Nunes	def.	Cynthia Calvillo	Decision (split) (28–29, 29–28, 30–27)	3	5:00
Lightweight	Gabriel Benítez	def.	Charlie Ontiveros	TKO (punches)	1	3:35
Flyweight	Tyson Nam	def.	Ode' Osbourne	KO (punches)	1	2:59
Catchweight (180 lb)	Josh Quinlan	def.	Jason Witt	KO (punch)	1	2:09
Bantamweight	Da'Mon Blackshear	vs.	Youssef Zalal	Draw (majority) (29–28, 28–28, 28–28)	3	5:00

== Bonus awards ==
The following fighters received $50,000 bonuses.

- Fight of the Night: Nate Landwehr vs. David Onama
- Performance of the Night: Marlon Vera and Tyson Nam

== Reported payout ==
The following is the reported payout to the fighters as reported to the California State Athletic Commission (CSAC). The amounts do not include sponsor money, discretionary bonuses, viewership points or additional earnings. The total disclosed payout for the event was $1,708,000.

- Marlon Vera: $300,000 (includes $150,000 win bonus) def. Dominick Cruz: $175,000
- Nate Landwehr: $60,000 (includes $30,000 win bonus) def. David Onama: $24,000
- Yazmin Jauregui: $50,000 (includes $25,000 win bonus) def. Iasmin Lucindo: $12,000
- Azamat Murzakanov: $24,000 (includes $12,000 win bonus) def. Devin Clark: $75,000
- Priscila Cachoeira: $80,000 (includes $40,000 win bonus) def. Ariane Lipski: $40,000
- Gerald Meerschaert: $140,000 (includes $70,000 win bonus) def. Bruno Silva: $40,000
- Angela Hill: $190,000 (includes $95,000 win bonus) def. Lupita Godinez: $45,000
- Martin Buday: $24,000 (includes $12,000 win bonus) def. Łukasz Brzeski: $10,000
- Nina Nunes: $80,000 (includes $40,000 win bonus) def. Cynthia Calvillo: $70,000
- Gabriel Benítez: $100,000 (includes $50,000 win bonus) def. Charlie Ontiveros: $12,000
- Tyson Nam: $50,000 (includes $25,000 win bonus) def. Ode' Osbourne: $28,000
- Josh Quinlan: $20,000 (includes $10,000 win bonus) def. Jason Witt: $23,000
- Da'Mon Blackshear: $12,000 vs. Youssef Zalal: $24,000

== Fight night weights ==
The following is the official weigh-in weights compared to the fight night weights reported by the California State Athletic Commission.

- Marlon Vera: 135.5 to 151.8 pounds, 12%
- Dominick Cruz: 135 to 154 pounds, 14%
- Nate Landwehr: 145 to 161.4 pounds, 11%
- David Onama: 145 to 160.2 pounds, 10%
- Yazmin Jauregui: 115 to 130.4 pounds, 14%
- Iasmin Lucindo: 115 to 131.4 pounds, 13%
- Azamat Murzakanov: 205 to 219.4 pounds, 8%
- Devin Clark: 205 to 220.4 pounds, 8%
- Priscila Cachoeira: 135 to 147.4 pounds, 9%
- Ariane Lipski: 135 to 142.2 pounds, 5%
- Gerald Meerschaert: 185 to 203.4 pounds, 10%
- Bruno Silva: 185 to 199.8 pounds, 7%
- Angela Hill: 120 to 126.8 pounds, 6%
- Lupita Godinez: 120 to 130 pounds, 9%
- Martin Buday: 266 to 290.4 pounds, 9%
- Lukasz Brzeski: 236.5 to 240 pounds, 1%
- Nina Nunes: 125 to 130.2 pounds, 4%
- Cynthia Calvillo: 125 to 136.4 pounds, 9%
- Gabriel Benitez: 155 to 170.2 pounds, 10%
- Charlie Ontiveros: 155 to 165.4 pounds, 7%
- Tyson Nam: 126 to 146.2 pounds, 16%
- Ode Osbourne: 125 to 138.6 pounds, 11%
- Josh Quinlan: 175 to 185 pounds, 6%
- Jason Witt: 179.5 to 191 pounds, 6%
- Youssef Zalal: 135.5 to 154.6 pounds, 14%
- Da’Mon Blackshear: 136 to 152.4 pounds, 12%

== See also ==
- List of UFC events
- List of current UFC fighters
- 2022 in UFC
