= UFC Fight Night: Ladd vs. Dumont =

Mixed martial arts event in 2021

- The poster for UFC Fight Night: Ladd vs. Dumont
- Promotion: Ultimate Fighting Championship
- Date: October 16, 2021
- Venue: UFC Apex
- City: Enterprise, Nevada, United States
- Attendance: Not announced

Event chronology
UFC Fight Night: Dern vs. Rodriguez	UFC Fight Night: Ladd vs. Dumont	UFC Fight Night: Costa vs. Vettori

UFC Fight Night: Ladd vs. Dumont (also known as UFC Fight Night 195, UFC Vegas 40 and UFC on ESPN+ 53) was a mixed martial arts event produced by the Ultimate Fighting Championship that took place on October 16, 2021, at the UFC Apex facility in Enterprise, Nevada, part of the Las Vegas Metropolitan Area, United States.

== Background ==
A women's bantamweight bout between Ketlen Vieira and former Strikeforce and UFC Women's Bantamweight Champion Miesha Tate was expected to headline the event. However, on September 22, the bout was pulled from the card after Tate tested positive for COVID-19. In turn, a women's featherweight bout between fellow former bantamweight champion Holly Holm and Norma Dumont was elevated to the main event. However on October 6, it was reported that Holm was forced to pull out of the event due to injury. She was replaced by Aspen Ladd.

A bantamweight bout between Timur Valiev and Daniel Santos was expected to take place at the event. However, in mid-September, Valiev withdrew due to injury and was replaced by Marcelo Rojo. In turn, Santos withdrew for unknown reasons and the bout was scrapped.

A women's flyweight bout between Manon Fiorot and Mayra Bueno Silva took place at this event. The bout was originally scheduled for UFC 266 but was postponed due to COVID-19 protocols.

A women's flyweight bout between Luana Carolina and Maryna Moroz was expected to take place at this event. However in late September, Moroz pulled out of the bout and was replaced by Sijara Eubanks. In turn, Eubanks was pulled from the event due to COVID-19 protocols and replaced by Lupita Godinez. Godinez made history as the first fighter to compete twice in the span of seven days, a record in modern UFC, non-tournament fights. The previous fastest turnaround was 10 days, when Khamzat Chimaev competed against John Phillips and Rhys McKee in July 2020.

A light heavyweight bout between Kennedy Nzechukwu and Da Un Jung was expected to take place at the event. However, the bout was postponed to UFC Fight Night: Holloway vs. Rodríguez for unknown reasons.

At the weigh-ins, Julian Marquez was pulled from his middleweight bout against Jordan Wright due to "non-COVID health issues." He never made it to the scale, even though his opponent weighed in within the middleweight non-title fight limit. As a result, the bout was cancelled.

== Results ==
Main card (ESPN+)
Weight class				Method	Round	Time	Notes
Women's Featherweight	Norma Dumont	def.	Aspen Ladd	Decision (unanimous) (49–46, 49–46, 48–47)	5	5:00
Heavyweight	Andrei Arlovski	def.	Carlos Felipe	Decision (unanimous) (29–28, 29–28, 29–28)	3	5:00
Lightweight	Jim Miller	def.	Erick Gonzalez	KO (punch)	2	0:14
Women's Flyweight	Manon Fiorot	def.	Mayra Bueno Silva	Decision (unanimous) (30–26, 30–27, 30–27)	3	5:00
Featherweight	Nate Landwehr	def.	Ľudovít Klein	Submission (anaconda choke)	3	2:22
Preliminary card (ESPN+)
Middleweight	Bruno Silva	def.	Andrew Sanchez	TKO (punches)	3	2:35
Welterweight	Danny Roberts	def.	Ramazan Emeev	Decision (split) (29–28, 28–29, 30–27)	3	5:00
Women's Flyweight	Luana Carolina	def.	Lupita Godinez	Decision (unanimous) (29–28, 29–28, 29–28)	3	5:00
Bantamweight	Danaa Batgerel	def.	Brandon Davis	TKO (elbows and punches)	1	2:01
Women's Strawweight	Ariane Carnelossi	def.	Istela Nunes	Submission (rear-naked choke)	3	2:57

== Bonus awards ==
The following fighters received $50,000 bonuses.

- Fight of the Night: No bonus awarded.
- Performance of the Night: Jim Miller, Nate Landwehr, Bruno Silva, and Danaa Batgerel

== See also ==
- List of UFC events
- List of current UFC fighters
- 2021 in UFC
