= Robert Bryczek =

Polish mixed martial artist (born 1990)

- Born: Robert Bryczek; July 4, 1990 (age 36); Bielsko-Biała, Poland
- Height: 6 ft 0 in (1.83 m)
- Weight: 186 lb (84 kg; 13 st 4 lb)
- Division: Welterweight (2016–2021); Middleweight (2011–2016, 2021–present)
- Reach: 75 in (191 cm)
- Fighting out of: Bielsko-Biała, Poland
- Team: Veto Team Bielsko-Biała
- Years active: 2011–present

Mixed martial arts record
- Total: 26
- Wins: 18
- By knockout: 12
- By submission: 1
- By decision: 5
- Losses: 8
- By knockout: 1
- By submission: 1
- By decision: 6

Other information
- Mixed martial arts record from Sherdog

Robert Bryczek (born July 4, 1990) is a Polish professional mixed martial artist. He currently competes in the Middleweight division of the Ultimate Fighting Championship (UFC). He is a former FEN Welterweight champion.

== Mixed martial arts career ==
=== Early career ===
Bryczek made his professional debut on September 18, 2011 against Łukasz Christ. Bryczek won the fight via a first-round submission.

=== PLMMA Welterweight champion ===
After accumulating a career record of 8–2, Bryczek faced Artur Kamiński on November 4, 2016 for the vacant PLMMA Welterweight championship. Bryczek won the fight via a unanimous decision, and thus winning his first career championship.

=== Oktagon MMA ===
After a three-year hiatus, Bryczek returned to the cage under Czech-based promotion Oktagon MMA on June 8, 2019 against Máté Kertész. Bryczek won the fight via Unanimous Decision.

His next fight came five months later on November 9 against Leandro Silva. Bryczek lost the fight via Unanimous Decision.

=== Fight Exclusive Night ===
Bryczek returned to his native Poland where he fought under Fight Exclusive Night. He made his debut on August 22, 2020 against Jacek Jędraszczyk. Bryczek won the fight via a first-round TKO.

==== FEN Welterweight Champion ====
Bryczek faced Virgiliu Frasineac on October 3, 2020 for the vacant FEN Welterweight championship. Bryczek won the fight via a fifth-round knockout, winning the championship in the process.

=== Return to Oktagon ===
Bryczek returned to Oktagon MMA on May 1, 2021 against Kaik Brito. Bryczek lost the fight via a first-round TKO.

His next fight came six months later on November 6 against Zdenek Polivka. Bryczek lost the fight via a Unanimous Decision.

=== Return to Fight Exclusive Night ===
Bryczek returned to Fight Exclusive Night on March 12, 2022 against Silas Robson. Bryczek won via TKO 17 seconds into the fight.

=== MMA Attack ===
Bryczek returned to Polish regional federation MMA Attack after last competing ten years prior. He faced Mateusz Strzelczyk on September 24, 2022. Bryczek won the fight via a first-round TKO.

=== Second return to Oktagon MMA ===
Bryczek returned to Oktagon MMA for a second time on December 3, 2022, where he faced Abdel Rahmane Driai. Bryczek won the fight via a first-round knockout.

His next fight came on May 20, 2023 against Lee Chadwick. Bryczek won the fight via a first-round knockout.

His final fight with the federation came on July 28, 2023 against Samuel Krištofič in a title eiliminator. Bryczek won the fight via a first-round TKO. This marked Bryczek's fifth first-round stoppage in a row.

=== Ultimate Fighting Championship ===
On August 23, 2023, it was confirmed that Bryczek had signed with the Ultimate Fighting Championship.

Bryczek was scheduled to make his promotional debut against Jacob Malkoun on September 23, 2023 at UFC Fight Night 228 alongside compatriot Mateusz Gamrot. Bryczek later withdrew, and was replaced by Cody Brundage.

Bryczek was scheduled to face Albert Duraev on February 10, 2024 at UFC Fight Night 236, however Duraev withdrew and was replaced by Ihor Potieria. Before the bout, Potieria weighed in 2.5 lbs over the Middleweight limit. The bout went on as a catchweight, and Potieria forfeited 20 percent of his purse over to Bryczek. Bryczek lost his promotional debut via a unanimous decision.

Bryczek was scheduled to face Christian Leroy Duncan on July 27, 2024 at UFC 304. Bryczek later withdrew and was replaced by Gregory Rodrigues.

Bryczek made his return on September 6, 2025 against Brad Tavares at UFC Fight Night 258. Bryczek won the fight via a third-round TKO.

Bryczek faced Cameron Rowston on May 2, 2026 at UFC Fight Night 275. He lost the fight via unanimous decision.

Bryczek faced Rodolfo Vieira on September 26, 2026 at UFC Fight Night 289. He lost the fight by unanimous decision.

== Championships and accomplishments ==
=== Mixed martial arts ===
- Fight Exclusive Night
  - FEN Welterweight championship (One time; former)
- Profesjonalna Liga MMA
  - PLMMA Welterweight championship (One time; former)

== Mixed martial arts record ==
Professional record breakdown
26 matches	18 wins	8 losses
By knockout	12	1
By submission	1	1
By decision	5	6

Res.	Record	Opponent	Method	Event	Date	Round	Time	Location	Notes
Loss	18–8	Rodolfo Vieira	Decision (unanimous)	UFC Fight Night: Rosas Jr. vs. Barcelos	26 September 2026	3	5:00	Las Vegas, Nevada, United States	
Loss	18–7	Cameron Rowston	Decision (unanimous)	UFC Fight Night: Della Maddalena vs. Prates	2 May 2026	3	5:00	Perth, Australia	
Win	18–6	Brad Tavares	TKO (punches)	UFC Fight Night: Imavov vs. Borralho	6 September 2025	3	1:43	Paris, France	
Loss	17–6	Ihor Potieria	Decision (unanimous)	UFC Fight Night: Hermansson vs. Pyfer	10 February 2024	3	5:00	Las Vegas, Nevada, United States	Catchweight (187.5 lb) bout; Potieria missed weight.
Win	17–5	Samuel Krištofič	TKO (punches)	Oktagon 45 Special	28 July 2023	1	0:55	Prague, Czech Republic	Oktagon Middleweight title eliminator.
Win	16–5	Lee Chadwick	KO (punch)	Oktagon 43	20 May 2023	1	2:41	Prague, Czech Republic	
Win	15–5	Abdel Rahmane Driai	KO (punch)	Oktagon 37	3 December 2022	1	1:25	Ostrava, Czech Republic	
Win	14–5	Mateusz Strzelczyk	KO (punch)	MMA Attack 4	24 September 2022	1	1:57	Będzin, Poland	Catchweight (190 lb) bout.
Win	13–5	Silas Robson	TKO (punches)	Fight Exclusive Night 39	12 March 2022	1	0:17	Ząbki, Poland	
Loss	12–5	Zdenek Polivka	Decision (unanimous)	Oktagon Prime 4	6 November 2021	3	5:00	Pardubice, Czech Republic	Return to Middleweight.
Loss	12–4	Kaik Brito	TKO (punches)	Oktagon 23	1 May 2021	1	1:33	Brno, Czech Republic	
Win	12–3	Virgiliu Frasineac	TKO (punches)	Fight Exclusive Night 30	3 October 2020	5	3:28	Wrocław, Poland	Won the vacant FEN Welterweight Championship.
Win	11–3	Jacek Jędraszczyk	TKO (punches)	Fight Exclusive Night 29	22 August 2020	1	1:13	Ostróda, Poland	
Loss	10–3	Leandro Silva	Decision (unanimous)	Oktagon 15	9 November 2019	3	5:00	Prague, Czech Republic	
Win	10–2	Máté Kertész	Decision (unanimous)	Oktagon 12	8 June 2019	3	5:00	Bratislava, Slovakia	
Win	9–2	Artur Kamiński	Decision (unanimous)	PLMMA 70	4 November 2016	5	5:00	Warsaw, Poland	Welterweight debut. Won the vacant PLMMA Welterweight Championship.
Win	8–2	Grzegorz Siwy	Decision (unanimous)	Spartan Fight 4	6 August 2016	3	5:00	Bielsko-Biała, Poland	
Win	7–2	Alexander Bergman	TKO (punches)	Superkombat FC: Special Edition	12 December 2015	1	1:32	Turin, Italy	
Win	6–2	Łukasz Witos	Decision (unanimous)	PLMMA 56	19 June 2015	3	5:00	Bielsko-Biała, Poland	
Win	5–2	Mateusz Rycak	TKO (punches)	PLMMA 52	21 March 2015	1	3:19	Bytom, Poland	
Win	4–2	Dawid Nowak	TKO (punches)	Fight Night Łobez 2	30 November 2013	2	4:15	Łobez, Poland	
Loss	3–2	Sadibou Sy	Decision (unanimous)	International Ring Fight Arena 5	19 October 2013	3	5:00	Stockholm, Sweden	
Win	3–1	Mateusz Pogudz	Decision (unanimous)	PLMMA 10	29 December 2012	3	5:00	Warsaw, Poland	
Win	2–1	Paweł Krzeszowiec	TKO (punches)	PLMMA 9	24 November 2012	1	1:39	Chełm, Poland	
Loss	1–1	Livio Victoriano	Submission (heel hook)	MMA Attack 2	27 April 2012	1	1:38	Katowice, Poland	
Win	1–0	Łukasz Christ	Submission (triangle choke)	Kazimierza Wielka Fight Night 1	18 September 2011	1	2:17	Kazimierza Wielka, Poland	Middleweight debut.

== See also ==
- List of current UFC fighters
- List of male mixed martial artists
