= UFC Fight Night: Cannonier vs. Strickland =

UFC mixed martial arts event in 2022

- The poster for UFC Fight Night: Cannonier vs. Strickland
- Promotion: Ultimate Fighting Championship
- Date: December 17, 2022
- Venue: UFC Apex
- City: Enterprise, Nevada, United States
- Attendance: Not announced

Event chronology
UFC 282: Błachowicz vs. Ankalaev	UFC Fight Night: Cannonier vs. Strickland	UFC Fight Night: Strickland vs. Imavov

UFC Fight Night: Cannonier vs. Strickland (also known as UFC Fight Night 216, UFC on ESPN+ 74 and UFC Vegas 66) was a mixed martial arts event produced by the Ultimate Fighting Championship that took place on December 17, 2022, at the UFC Apex facility in Enterprise, Nevada, part of the Las Vegas Metropolitan Area, United States.

== Background ==
A middleweight bout between former UFC Middleweight Championship challenger Jared Cannonier and Sean Strickland served as the main event. The pairing was previously scheduled to headline UFC Fight Night: Grasso vs. Araújo, but it was scrapped after Strickland withdrew due to a finger infection.

A middleweight bout between Bruno Silva and Albert Duraev was scheduled to take place at the event. However, Silva withdrew due to an injury and was replaced by Michał Oleksiejczuk. In turn, Duraev was forced to withdraw for undisclosed reasons and was replaced by Cody Brundage.

Former UFC Flyweight Championship challenger Alex Perez was expected to face Amir Albazi at the event. However, he pulled out due to undisclosed reasons in late October and was replaced by Brandon Royval. In turn, Royval withdrew from the card in late November due to a broken wrist during training and was replaced by former LUX Fight League Flyweight Champion Alessandro Costa.

A light heavyweight bout between Tafon Nchukwi and Jamal Pogues was expected to take the event. However, Pogues pull out from the bout due to undisclosed reasons and was replaced by Vitor Petrino. Nchukwi eventually pulled out of the bout himself due to undisclosed reasons and the bout was scrapped.

Michael Morales was expected to face Rinat Fakhretdinov in a welterweight bout. However, Morales pulled out due to a fractured toe. He was replaced by The Return of The Ultimate Fighter: Team Volkanovski vs. Team Ortega middleweight winner Bryan Battle.

A middleweight bout between Julian Marquez and Deron Winn was expected to take place at the event. However, just two days before the event, Winn was forced to withdraw after fainting and falling down a set of stairs, sustaining a minor concussion. As a result, the bout was scrapped.

At the weigh-ins, Hayisaer Maheshate weighed in at 158.5 pounds, two and a half pounds over the lightweight non-title fight limit. His bout proceeded at catchweight and he was fined 20% of his purse, which went to his opponent Rafa García.

== Results ==
Main card (ESPN+)
Weight class				Method	Round	Time	Notes
Middleweight	Jared Cannonier	def.	Sean Strickland	Decision (split) (49–46, 46–49, 49–46)	5	5:00
Lightweight	Arman Tsarukyan	def.	Damir Ismagulov	Decision (unanimous) (30–27, 30–27, 30–27)	3	5:00
Flyweight	Amir Albazi	def.	Alessandro Costa	KO (punches)	3	2:13
Featherweight	Alex Caceres	def.	Julian Erosa	TKO (head kick and punches)	1	3:04
Lightweight	Drew Dober	def.	Bobby Green	KO (punch)	2	2:45
Middleweight	Michał Oleksiejczuk	def.	Cody Brundage	KO (punches)	1	3:16
Preliminary card (ESPN+)
Women's Strawweight	Cory McKenna	def.	Cheyanne Vlismas	Decision (unanimous) (29–28, 29–28, 29–28)	3	5:00
Welterweight	Matthew Semelsberger	def.	Jake Matthews	Decision (unanimous) (30–27, 29–28, 29–28)	3	5:00
Bantamweight	Said Nurmagomedov	def.	Saidyokub Kakhramonov	Submission (ninja choke)	2	3:50
Catchweight (158.5 lb)	Rafa García	def.	Hayisaer Maheshate	Decision (unanimous) (30–27, 30–27, 30–27)	3	5:00
Welterweight	Rinat Fakhretdinov	def.	Bryan Battle	Decision (unanimous) (30–25, 30–25, 30–27)	3	5:00
Flyweight	Manel Kape	def.	David Dvořák	Decision (unanimous) (30–27, 30–27, 29–28)	3	5:00
Bantamweight	Sergey Morozov	def.	Journey Newson	Decision (unanimous) (30–27, 29–28, 29–28)	3	5:00

== Bonus awards ==
The following fighters received $50,000 bonuses.

- Fight of the Night: Drew Dober vs. Bobby Green
- Performance of the Night: Alex Caceres and Michał Oleksiejczuk

== See also ==
- List of UFC events
- List of current UFC fighters
- 2022 in UFC
