= UFC on ESPN: Barboza vs. Chikadze =

Mixed martial arts event in 2021

- The poster for UFC on ESPN: Barboza vs. Chikadze
- Promotion: Ultimate Fighting Championship
- Date: August 28, 2021
- Venue: UFC Apex
- City: Enterprise, Nevada, United States
- Attendance: Not announced

Event chronology
UFC on ESPN: Cannonier vs. Gastelum	UFC on ESPN: Barboza vs. Chikadze	UFC Fight Night: Brunson vs. Till

UFC on ESPN: Barboza vs. Chikadze (also known as UFC on ESPN 30 and UFC Vegas 35) was a mixed martial arts event produced by the Ultimate Fighting Championship that took place on August 28, 2021, at the UFC Apex facility in Enterprise, Nevada, part of the Las Vegas Metropolitan Area, United States.

== Background ==
A featherweight bout between Edson Barboza and Giga Chikadze headlined the event.

The Return of The Ultimate Fighter: Team Volkanovski vs. Team Ortega season finale took place at this event, featuring the tournament finals of both the middleweight and bantamweight divisions. Tresean Gore pulled out of the middleweight final against Bryan Battle due to a meniscus injury and was replaced by Gilbert Urbina.

A light heavyweight bout between Dustin Jacoby and Askar Mozharov was scheduled for the event. However, Mazharov was removed from the event due to undisclosed reason and was replaced by Darren Stewart.

A welterweight bout between former interim UFC Lightweight Championship challenger Kevin Lee and Sean Brady was rescheduled for the event. The pairing was initially scheduled to take meet at UFC 264, but Lee withdrew due to an injury and the bout was scrapped. Subsequently, the bout was yet again cancelled after Brady withdrew due to a foot infection. Lee faced Daniel Rodriguez instead.

A flyweight bout between former UFC Flyweight Championship challenger Alex Perez and Matt Schnell was rescheduled for the event. They were originally expected to meet at UFC 262, before Perez was forced to pull out due to undisclosed reasons. The pairing was eventually shifted to UFC Fight Night: Brunson vs. Till due to undisclosed reasons.

A women's bantamweight bout featuring Joselyne Edwards and Zarah Fairn Dos Santos was expected to take place at this event. However, the contest was cancelled in late July as Edwards was removed from the event in favor of another bout against Jessica-Rose Clark at UFC Fight Night 196 in October.

Kevin Croom was expected to face Marcelo Rojo in a featherweight bout at the event. However, Croom was removed from the card in mid-August for undisclosed reasons. In turn, Rojo was rescheduled to face Jonathan Martinez the following week at UFC Fight Night: Brunson vs. Till.

Antônio Braga Neto and Abdul Razak Alhassan were expected to meet in a middleweight bout a week earlier at UFC on ESPN: Cannonier vs. Gastelum. They were eventually rescheduled for this event. However, Neto was pulled from the event on August 21 due to undisclosed reasons and the bout was scrapped.

A middleweight bout between Alessio Di Chirico and Aliaskhab Khizriev was also expected to take place at the event. However, the week before the event, Khizriev withdrew due to an undisclosed injury. Di Chirico was then scheduled to face Alhassan instead.

2004 Olympic silver medalist in wrestling and former UFC Women's Bantamweight Championship challenger Sara McMann was expected to meet Ketlen Vieira in a women's bantamweight rematch at this event. They previously met at UFC 215, with Vieira winning via a second round arm-triangle choke. However, McMann announced in mid August that a "reinjury" forced her out of the bout.

A women's flyweight between Tracy Cortez and JJ Aldrich was scheduled for the event. However, Cortez was pulled from the fight due to injury. She was replaced by promotional newcomer Vanessa Demopoulos.

A bantamweight bout between Mario Bautista and Guido Cannetti was expected to take place at the event. However, Bautista tested positive for COVID-19 and was pulled from the card. He was replaced by Mana Martinez. At the weigh-ins, Martinez weighed in at 140 pounds, four pounds over the bantamweight non-title fight limit. The bout proceeded at a catchweight and he forfeited 30% of his purse to Cannetti.

== Results ==
Main card (ESPN / ESPN+)
Weight class				Method	Round	Time	Notes
Featherweight	Giga Chikadze	def.	Edson Barboza	TKO (punches)	3	1:44
Middleweight	Bryan Battle	def.	Gilbert Urbina	Submission (rear-naked choke)	2	2:15	(Note: The Ultimate Fighter 29 Middleweight tournament final.)
Bantamweight	Ricky Turcios	def.	Brady Hiestand	Decision (split) (29–28, 28–29, 29–28)	3	5:00	(Note: The Ultimate Fighter 29 Bantamweight tournament final.)
Welterweight	Daniel Rodriguez	def.	Kevin Lee	Decision (unanimous) (29–28, 29–28, 29–28)	3	5:00
Middleweight	Andre Petroski	def.	Micheal Gillmore	TKO (elbows and punches)	3	3:12
Middleweight	Gerald Meerschaert	def.	Makhmud Muradov	Submission (rear-naked choke)	2	1:49
Preliminary card (ESPN+)
Middleweight	Abdul Razak Alhassan	def.	Alessio Di Chirico	KO (head kick)	1	0:17
Middleweight	Wellington Turman	def.	Sam Alvey	Decision (split) (27–28, 28–27, 28–27)	3	5:00	(Note: Turman was twice deducted one point in round 3 due to repeated eye pokes.)
Light Heavyweight	Dustin Jacoby	def.	Darren Stewart	TKO (punches)	1	3:04
Women's Flyweight	JJ Aldrich	def.	Vanessa Demopoulos	Decision (unanimous) (30–27, 30–27, 30–27)	3	5:00
Featherweight	Pat Sabatini	def.	Jamall Emmers	Submission (heel hook)	1	1:53
Catchweight (140 lb)	Mana Martinez	def.	Guido Cannetti	Decision (split) (29–28, 28–29, 29–28)	3	5:00

== Bonus awards ==
The following fighters received $50,000 bonuses.

- Fight of the Night: No bonus awarded.
- Performance of the Night: Giga Chikadze, Gerald Meerschaert, Abdul Razak Alhassan, and Pat Sabatini

== See also ==
- List of UFC events
- List of current UFC fighters
- 2021 in UFC
