= Bryan Battle =

American mixed martial artist (born 1994)

- Born: Bryan Christopher Battle; September 21, 1994 (age 32); Springfield, Missouri, U.S.
- Other names: The Butcher; Pooh Bear
- Height: 6 ft 2 in (188 cm)
- Weight: 185 lb (84 kg; 13 st 3 lb)
- Division: Welterweight (2022-present); Middleweight (2018-2022); Light Heavyweight (2017-2018); Heavyweight (2017)
- Reach: 77 in (196 cm)
- Stance: Orthodox
- Fighting out of: Charlotte, North Carolina, U.S.
- Team: Carolina Combat Sports and Fitness
- Years active: 2017–present

Mixed martial arts record
- Total: 17
- Wins: 13
- By knockout: 4
- By submission: 5
- By decision: 4
- Losses: 3
- By submission: 2
- By decision: 1
- No contests: 1

Other information
- Mixed martial arts record from Sherdog

Bryan Christopher Battle (born September 21, 1994) is an American professional mixed martial artist, who competes in the Middleweight division of the Professional Fighters League (PFL). A professional since 2019, Battle was the middleweight tournament winner in the 29th season of The Ultimate Fighter and went 7-1 in the promotion. As of August 21, 2026, he is #4 in the PFL middleweight rankings.

== Background ==
Born in Springfield, Missouri, Battle grew up in Charlotte, North Carolina. During his childhood in Charlotte, he and his family were homeless for a short period of time, due to an accidental house fire caused by one of his cousins.

In 2016, Battle began training MMA at age 21, when he weighed nearly 300-pounds. Soon after, he decided to drop out of college to pursue a career as a mixed martial artist. Battle worked at Chick-fil-A and then as a carpenter, until he was able to make a living as a fighter.

== Mixed martial arts career ==
=== Early career ===
Battle began competing in mixed martial arts in 2017, earning an amateur record of 8–2 and gaining notable wins over future UFC fighters such as Cody Brundage and Impa Kasanganay. During his amateur career, Battle fought at middleweight, light heavyweight and heavyweight. After turning professional in 2019, he fought in multiple regional promotions across his native North Carolina and the Southern United States, compiling a 5–1 professional record, with 4 stoppage wins.

=== The Ultimate Fighter 29 ===
In April 2021, it was announced that Battle would be a cast member on The Return of The Ultimate Fighter: Team Volkanovski vs. Team Ortega competing in the middleweight tournament.

In the quarterfinal, Battle faced Kemran Lachinov and won the fight by unanimous decision.

In the semifinal, Battle faced Andre Petroski and won the fight by ninja choke in round two.

In the final, Battle was scheduled to face Tresean Gore on August 28, 2021, at UFC on ESPN 30. However, Gore pulled out due to a meniscus injury and was replaced by Gilbert Urbina. He won the tournament via rear-naked choke in round two.

=== Ultimate Fighting Championship ===
The match between Battle and Gore was rescheduled on February 5, 2022, at UFC Fight Night 200. He won the fight via unanimous decision.

Battle made his welterweight debut against Takashi Sato on August 6, 2022, at UFC on ESPN 40. He won the fight via head kick knockout in the first round. This win earning him the Performance of the Night award.

Battle faced Rinat Fakhretdinov, replacing Michael Morales on December 17, 2022, at UFC Fight Night 216. He lost the bout via unanimous decision.

Battle faced Gabriel Green, replacing Jake Matthews on May 13, 2023, at UFC on ABC 4. At the weigh-ins, Battle weighed in at 173 pounds, two pounds over the welterweight non-title fight limit. The bout proceeded at catchweight and Battle was fined a percentage of his purse, which went to Green. He won the fight by knockout just 14 seconds into the first round. This win earning him the Performance of the Night award, despite having missed weight.

Battle faced A.J. Fletcher on September 23, 2023, at UFC Fight Night 228. He won the fight via rear-naked choke in the second round.

Battle faced Ange Loosa on March 16, 2024, at UFC Fight Night 239. During the second round, Battle accidentally poked Loosa in the eye rendering him unable to continue. The fight was declared a no contest.

Battle faced Kevin Jousset on September 28, 2024, at UFC Fight Night 243. He won the bout via technical knockout in the second round and this win earning him the Performance of the Night award.

Battle faced Randy Brown on December 7, 2024 at UFC 310. At the weigh-ins, Battle weighed in at 175 pounds, four pounds over the welterweight non-title fight limit. The bout proceeded at catchweight and Battle was fined 30 percent of his purse which went to Brown. Battle won the fight by split decision.

Battle was scheduled to face Nursulton Ruziboev in a middleweight bout on August 16, 2025 at UFC 319. However, at the weigh-ins, Battle weighed in at 190 pounds, four pounds over the middleweight non-title fight limit. The bout was scheduled to proceed at catchweight, however shortly thereafter, it was announced that the bout had been cancelled.

Battle was released from the UFC on August 20, 2025 following his string of weight misses.

=== Dirty Boxing ===
On August 22, 2025, it was reported that Battle had signed with Mike Perry's "Dirty Boxing" promotion to compete at DBX 3 on August 29, 2025 against Derik de Freitas. Battle won the bout via technical knockout in just 56 seconds.

Battle faced Nicholas Kohring on 30 October 2025, at DBX 4. He won the bout by technical knockout in the first round in 48 seconds.

=== Professional Fighters League ===
On September 5, 2025, it was announced that Battle signed a multi-year contract with the Professional Fighters League (PFL).

Battle faced former Bellator Middleweight Champion Johnny Eblen on March 28, 2026 at PFL Pittsburgh. He lost the fight via a rear-naked choke in round one.

Battle faced Dalton Rosta in the main event on August 7, 2026, at PFL Charlotte. He won the fight via split decision.

== Championships and accomplishments ==
=== Mixed martial arts ===
- Ultimate Fighting Championship
  - The Ultimate Fighter 29 Middleweight Tournament Winner
  - Performance of the Night (Three times) vs. Takashi Sato, Gabriel Green, and Kevin Jousset
- Fight Lab
  - Fight Lab Light Heavyweight Championship (One time; former)
- BodySlam.net
  - 2024 Promo of the Year after knocking out Kevin Jousset

== Personal life ==
Battle is married and has two kids with his wife.

== Mixed martial arts record ==
Professional record breakdown
17 matches	13 wins	3 losses
By knockout	4	0
By submission	5	2
By decision	4	1
No contests	1	

Res.	Record	Opponent	Method	Event	Date	Round	Time	Location	Notes
Win	13–3 (1)	Dalton Rosta	Decision (split)	PFL Charlotte: Battle vs. Rosta	August 7, 2026	3	5:00	Charlotte, North Carolina, United States	
Loss	12–3 (1)	Johnny Eblen	Submission (rear-naked choke)	PFL Pittsburgh: Eblen vs. Battle	March 28, 2026	1	4:10	Moon Township, Pennsylvania, United States	Return to Middleweight.
Win	12–2 (1)	Randy Brown	Decision (split)	UFC 310	December 7, 2024	3	5:00	Las Vegas, Nevada, United States	Catchweight (175 lb) bout; Battle missed weight.
Win	11–2 (1)	Kevin Jousset	TKO (punches)	UFC Fight Night: Moicano vs. Saint Denis	September 28, 2024	2	3:47	Paris, France	Performance of the Night.
NC	10–2 (1)	Ange Loosa	NC (accidental eye poke)	UFC Fight Night: Tuivasa vs. Tybura	March 16, 2024	2	1:00	Las Vegas, Nevada, United States	Accidental eye poke rendered Loosa unable to continue.
Win	10–2	A.J. Fletcher	Submission (rear-naked choke)	UFC Fight Night: Fiziev vs. Gamrot	September 23, 2023	2	4:32	Las Vegas, Nevada, United States	
Win	9–2	Gabriel Green	KO (punch)	UFC on ABC: Rozenstruik vs. Almeida	May 13, 2023	1	0:14	Charlotte, North Carolina, United States	Catchweight (173 lb) bout; Battle missed weight. Performance of the Night.
Loss	8–2	Rinat Fakhretdinov	Decision (unanimous)	UFC Fight Night: Cannonier vs. Strickland	December 17, 2022	3	5:00	Las Vegas, Nevada, United States	
Win	8–1	Takashi Sato	KO (head kick)	UFC on ESPN: Santos vs. Hill	August 6, 2022	1	0:44	Las Vegas, Nevada, United States	Welterweight debut. Performance of the Night.
Win	7–1	Tresean Gore	Decision (unanimous)	UFC Fight Night: Hermansson vs. Strickland	February 5, 2022	3	5:00	Las Vegas, Nevada, United States	
Win	6–1	Gilbert Urbina	Submission (rear naked choke)	UFC on ESPN: Barboza vs. Chikadze	August 28, 2021	2	2:15	Las Vegas, Nevada, United States	Won The Ultimate Fighter 29 Middleweight Tournament.
Win	5–1	Ben Fowler	Submission (rear-naked choke)	Hardrock MMA 117	February 6, 2021	2	1:02	Shepherdsville, Kentucky, United States	
Win	4–1	Josh Krizan	TKO (punches)	Hardrock MMA 116	November 6, 2020	2	4:40	Elizabethtown, Kentucky, United States	
Win	3–1	Garrett Fosdyck	Submission (choke)	Showcase MMA 13	August 15, 2020	1	3:21	Kingsport, Tennessee, United States	
Win	2–1	Aaron Chambers	Submission (triangle choke)	Fight for It 9	November 23, 2019	2	2:39	Hickory, North Carolina, United States	
Loss	1–1	Nickalas Martino	Submission (armbar)	Fight for It 8	September 14, 2019	1	0:51	Hickory, North Carolina, United States	
Win	1–0	Zac Dalen	Decision (unanimous)	Fight for It 7	July 13, 2019	3	5:00	Hickory, North Carolina, United States	Middleweight debut.

Exhibition record breakdown		
2 matches	2 wins	0 losses
By submission	1	0
By decision	1	0

Res.	Record	Opponent	Method	Event	Date	Round	Time	Location	Notes
Win	2–0	Andre Petroski	Submission (ninja choke)	The Return of The Ultimate Fighter: Team Volkanovski vs. Team Ortega	August 3, 2021 (airdate)	2	2:05	Las Vegas, Nevada, United States	The Ultimate Fighter 29 Semifinal.
Win	1–0	Kemran Lachinov	Decision (unanimous)	The Return of The Ultimate Fighter: Team Volkanovski vs. Team Ortega	June 29, 2021 (airdate)	2	5:00	Las Vegas, Nevada, United States	The Ultimate Fighter 29 Quarterfinal.

Amateur record breakdown		
10 matches	8 wins	2 losses
By knockout	2	1
By submission	3	0
By decision	3	1

Res.	Record	Opponent	Method	Event	Date	Round	Time	Location	Notes
Loss	8–2	Billy Elekana	Decision (split)	Tuff-N-Uff: Mayhem in Mesquite 16	December 15, 2018	3	3:00	Mesquite, Nevada, United States	For the TUFF Light Heavyweight Championship.
Win	8–1	Donterry Woods	Submission (rear naked choke)	Ultimate Battle Grounds 2	August 25, 2018	1	1:43	Wilmington, North Carolina, United States	
Win	7–1	Cody Brundage	Decision (split)	KOTC: Hard Knocks 3	July 28, 2018	3	3:00	Salamanca, New York, United States	
Win	6–1	Impa Kasanganay	Decision (unanimous)	Fight Lab 59	June 22, 2018	5	4:00	Charlotte, North Carolina, United States	Won the Fight Lab Light Heavyweight Championship.
Win	5–1	Brandon Hunt Jr.	Submission (rear naked choke)	KOTC: No Retreat	May 12, 2018	2	2:02	Salamanca, New York, United States	
Win	4–1	Brandon Schofield	Decision (unanimous)	Fight Lab 58	March 17, 2018	3	3:00	Charlotte, North Carolina, United States	
Win	3–1	Harley Rabon	TKO (punches)	Warfare MMA 17	December 15, 2017	1	0:43	Myrtle Beach, South Carolina, United States	
Win	2–1	Edward Sponeybarger	Submission (rear naked choke)	KOTC: Ultimate Mix	November 18, 2017	2	0:52	Salamanca, New York, United States	
Win	1–1	Alex Pokki	TKO (punches)	Next Level Fight Club 8	September 16, 2017	1	2:28	Raleigh, North Carolina, United States	
Loss	0–1	Michel Andre	TKO (punches)	LFA 8	April 7, 2017	1	1:54	Greenville, South Carolina, United States	

== Dirty Boxing record ==
Professional record breakdown
2 matches	2 wins	0 losses
By knockout	2	0
By submission	0	0
By decision	0	0

Res.	Record	Opponent	Method	Event	Date	Round	Time	Location	Notes
Win	2–0	Nick Kohring	KO (punches)	Dirty Boxing Championship 4	October 30, 2025	1	0:48	Nashville, Tennessee, United States	
Win	1–0	Derik de Freitas	TKO (punches)	Dirty Boxing Championship 3	August 29, 2025	1	0:56	Miami, Florida, United States	Dirty Boxing debut.

== See also ==
- List of male mixed martial artists
