= UFC on ABC: Rozenstruik vs. Almeida =

Mixed martial arts event in 2023

- The poster for UFC on ABC: Rozenstruik vs. Almeida
- Promotion: Ultimate Fighting Championship
- Date: May 13, 2023
- Venue: Spectrum Center
- City: Charlotte, North Carolina, United States
- Attendance: 18,712
- Total gate: $2,090,000

Event chronology
UFC 288: Sterling vs. Cejudo	UFC on ABC: Rozenstruik vs. Almeida	UFC Fight Night: Dern vs. Hill

UFC on ABC: Rozenstruik vs. Almeida (also known as UFC on ABC 4) was a mixed martial arts event produced by the Ultimate Fighting Championship that took place on May 13, 2023, at the Spectrum Center in Charlotte, North Carolina.

== Background ==
The event marked the promotion's fifth visit to Charlotte and first since UFC on Fox: Jacaré vs. Brunson 2 in January 2018.

A light heavyweight bout between former UFC Light Heavyweight Championship challenger Anthony Smith and Johnny Walker was originally expected to headline the event. However, the UFC decided to promote an already scheduled three-round heavyweight bout between Jairzinho Rozenstruik and Jailton Almeida to the five-round main event spot and downgrade the previous headliner to a three-round co-main event.

A women's flyweight bout between Kim Ji-yeon and Mandy Böhm took place at the event. They were previously scheduled to meet at UFC Fight Night: Lewis vs. Spivak, but Böhm was forced to withdraw due to illness.

A welterweight bout between Jake Matthews and Gabriel Green was scheduled for this event. However, Matthews withdrew from the bout due to injury and was replaced by The Return of The Ultimate Fighter: Team Volkanovski vs. Team Ortega middleweight winner Bryan Battle. At the weigh-ins, Battle weighed in at 173 pounds, two pounds over the welterweight non-title fight limit. Their bout proceeded at catchweight and he was fined a percentage of his purse which went to Green.

Natan Levy and Pete Rodriguez were originally expected to meet in a lightweight bout at UFC on ESPN: Song vs. Simón, but the pairing was cancelled due to an undisclosed issue on Rodriguez's side. They were eventually rescheduled for this event. In turn, the bout was scrapped the day before due to weight management issues related to Rodriguez.

A women's strawweight bout between Mackenzie Dern and former Invicta FC Strawweight Champion Angela Hill was expected to take place at this event. However, the bout was instead moved back one week to headline UFC Fight Night: Dern vs. Hill.

== Results ==
Main Card (ABC / ESPN+)
Weight class				Method	Round	Time	Notes
Heavyweight	Jailton Almeida	def.	Jairzinho Rozenstruik	Submission (rear-naked choke)	1	3:43
Light Heavyweight	Johnny Walker	def.	Anthony Smith	Decision (unanimous) (29–28, 30–27, 30–27)	3	5:00
Welterweight	Ian Machado Garry	def.	Daniel Rodriguez	TKO (head kick and punches)	1	2:57
Light Heavyweight	Carlos Ulberg	def.	Ihor Potieria	TKO (punches)	1	2:09
Welterweight	Alex Morono	def.	Tim Means	Submission (guillotine choke)	2	2:09
Preliminary Card (ESPN / ESPN+)
Welterweight	Matt Brown	def.	Court McGee	KO (punch)	1	4:09
Heavyweight	Karl Williams	def.	Chase Sherman	Decision (unanimous) (30–27, 30–27, 29–28)	3	5:00
Catchweight (140 lb)	Douglas Silva de Andrade	def.	Cody Stamann	Decision (unanimous) (29–28, 29–28, 29–28)	3	5:00
Women's Flyweight	Mandy Böhm	def.	Kim Ji-yeon	Technical Decision (split) (27–28, 28–27, 28–27)	3	1:55	(Note: Kim was deducted 1 point after round 2 due to striking Böhm after the bell. She was deducted another point in round 3 due to an illegal knee to a grounded opponent which rendered Böhm unable to continue.)
Catchweight (173 lb)	Bryan Battle	def.	Gabriel Green	KO (punch)	1	0:14
Women's Bantamweight	Tainara Lisboa	def.	Jessica-Rose Clark	Submission (rear-naked choke)	3	4:20

== Bonus awards ==
The following fighters received $50,000 bonuses.

- Fight of the Night: No bonus awarded.
- Performance of the Night: Jailton Almeida, Ian Machado Garry, Carlos Ulberg, Matt Brown, and Bryan Battle

== Records set ==
With 18,712 people in attendance, this event was the highest-attended UFC Fight Night event in the United States in the promotion's history.

== Reported payout ==
The following is the reported payout to the fighters as reported to the North Carolina Athletic Commission. The amounts do not include sponsor money, discretionary bonuses, viewership points, or additional earnings. The total disclosed payout for the event was $1,878,000.

- Jailton Almeida: $102,000 (includes $51,000 win bonus) def. Jairzinho Rozenstruik: $130,000
- Johnny Walker: $180,000 (includes $90,000 win bonus) def. Anthony Smith: $200,000
- Ian Machado Garry: $56,000 (includes $28,000 win bonus) def. Daniel Rodriguez: $78,000
- Carlos Ulberg: $66,000 (includes $33,000 win bonus) def. Ihor Potieria: $10,000
- Alex Morono: $180,000 (includes $90,000 win bonus) def. Tim Means: $90,000
- Matt Brown: $250,000 (includes $125,000 win bonus) def. Court McGee: $60,000
- Karl Williams: $24,000 (includes $12,000 win bonus) def. Chase Sherman: $33,000
- Douglas Silva de Andrade: $100,000 (includes $50,000 win bonus) def. Cody Stamann: $78,000
- Mandy Böhm: $20,000 (includes $10,000 win bonus) def. Ji Yeon Kim: $35,000
- Bryan Battle: $100,000 (includes $50,000 win bonus) def. Gabe Green: $26,000
- Tainara Lisboa: $20,000 (includes $10,000 win bonus) def. Jessica-Rose Clark: $38,000

== See also ==
- List of UFC events
- List of current UFC fighters
- 2023 in UFC
