= Abdul Razak Alhassan =

Ghanaian mixed martial arts fighter

- Born: August 11, 1985 (age 41); Accra, Ghana
- Other names: Judo Thunder
- Height: 5 ft 10 in (1.78 m)
- Weight: 185 lb (84 kg; 13.2 st)
- Division: Welterweight; Middleweight
- Reach: 73 in (185 cm)
- Style: Judo, Muay Thai
- Fighting out of: Denver, Colorado, U.S.
- Team: Fortis MMA (until 2021); Metroflex Gym; Team Elevation (2021–present)
- Rank: Black belt in Judo
- Years active: 2013–present

Mixed martial arts record
- Total: 20
- Wins: 12
- By knockout: 12
- Losses: 7
- By knockout: 2
- By submission: 1
- By decision: 4
- No contests: 1

Other information
- Mixed martial arts record from Sherdog

Abdul Razak Alhassan (born August 11, 1985) is a Ghanaian mixed martial artist who competed in the welterweight division of the Ultimate Fighting Championship (UFC). A professional since 2013, he formerly fought in Bellator and Legacy Fighting Championship.

== Mixed martial arts career ==
=== Early career ===
After training and competing in judo for 22 years and earning his black belt, Alhassan transitioned to mixed martial arts. He made his professional debut in 2013, winning via TKO in just 25 seconds. Alhassan then compiled an overall record of 6–0 before being signed by the UFC.

=== Ultimate Fighting Championship ===
Alhassan made his promotional debut at UFC Fight Night: Mousasi vs. Hall 2 against Charlie Ward on November 19, 2016. He won via knockout 53 seconds into the first round and was awarded a Performance of the Night bonus.

Alhassan then lost a split decision to Omari Akhmedov at UFC Fight Night: Gustafsson vs. Teixeira on May 28, 2017.

Alhassan faced Sabah Homasi on December 2, 2017, at UFC 218, winning by TKO in the first round; some felt referee Herb Dean had stopped the fight prematurely.

Due to the controversial stoppage in the first fight, a rematch with Homasi was held on January 20, 2018, at UFC 220. Alhassan indisputably knocked him out in the first round. The win earned him the Performance of the Night bonus

Alhassan was expected to face Muslim Salikhov on April 14, 2018, at UFC on Fox 29. He was replaced by Ricky Rainey due to injury.

Alhassan knocked out Niko Price in 43 seconds on September 8, 2018, at UFC 228.

Alhassan faced Mounir Lazzez on July 16, 2020, at UFC on ESPN: Kattar vs. Ige. At the weigh-ins, Alhassan weighed in at 174 pounds, 3 pounds over the welterweight non-title fight limit. He was fined 20% of his purse which went to his opponent Lazzez and the bout proceeded at a catchweight. He lost the fight via unanimous decision. This fight was named Fight of the Night bonus; however, Alhassan was disqualified for bonus due to missing weight, as a result a third Performance of the Night bonus was awarded and Lazzez took home an extra $50,000 from the fight.

Alhassan faced Khaos Williams on November 14, 2020, at UFC Fight Night: Felder vs. dos Anjos. At the weigh-ins, Alhassan weighed in at 172.5 pounds, one and a half pounds over the welterweight non-title fight limit. The bout proceeded at a catchweight and Alhassan was fined 20 percent of his purse, which went to his opponent Williams. He was defeated via first-round knockout.

Alhassan faced Jacob Malkoun in a return to middleweight on April 17, 2021, at UFC on ESPN 22. He lost the fight via unanimous decision.

Alhassan was scheduled to face Antônio Braga Neto on August 21, 2021, at UFC on ESPN 29. However, Neto was pulled from the event for undisclosed reasons and Alhassan was scheduled to face Alessio Di Chirico a week later instead. Alhassan won the fight via knockout seventeen seconds into round one. This win earned him the Performance of the Night award.

Alhassan was scheduled to face Joaquin Buckley on January 15, 2022, at UFC on ESPN 32. However, the pairing was cancelled after Alhassan withdrew for undisclosed reasons and the pair was rescheduled to UFC Fight Night 201. Alhassan lost the fight via split decision.

Alhassan was scheduled to face Jamie Pickett on July 9, 2022, at UFC on ESPN 39. However, Alhassan pulled out of the bout and was replaced by Denis Tiuliulin.

Alhassan faced Claudio Ribeiro on January 14, 2023, UFC Fight Night 217. He won the fight via knockout in the second round.

Alhassan was scheduled to face Brunno Ferreira on May 20, 2023, at UFC Fight Night 223 but was moved to UFC on ESPN 48 for unknown reasons. Alhassan then pulled out in late June and was replaced by Nursulton Ruziboev.

Alhassan faced Joe Pyfer on October 7, 2023, at UFC Fight Night 229. He lost the fight via technical submission in the second round after being rendered unconscious with an arm-triangle choke.

Alhassan faced Cody Brundage on July 13, 2024, at UFC on ESPN 59. The bout ended in a no-contest early in the first round as a result of elbows to the back of the head of Brundage rendering him unable to continue.

Alhassan was scheduled to face Josh Fremd on October 12, 2024, at UFC Fight Night 244. Because Fremd weighed in at 189 pounds, three pounds over the middleweight non-title fight limit, and was transported to the hospital afterwards, the bout was cancelled.

Alhassan faced César Almeida on January 11, 2025, at UFC Fight Night 249. He lost the fight by a left hook knockout in the first round.

On March 25, 2025, it was reported that Alhassan was removed from the UFC roster.

== Personal life ==
Alhassan and his wife have a son and a daughter.

=== Rape indictments and acquittal ===
Alhassan was indicted on September 24, 2018, in Tarrant County, Texas, on charges related to the alleged rapes of two women in one night in March 2018. He pleaded not guilty. The trial began on March 5, 2020. Alhassan's attorney argued that the two women consented to having sex with Alhassan, and that the allegations of sexual assault were fabricated. After deliberation, the jury found Alhassan not guilty on sexual assault charges.

== Championships and awards ==
- Ultimate Fighting Championship
  - Performance of the night (Three times) vs. Charlie Ward, Sabah Homasi and Alessio Di Chirico
  - Fastest head-kick knockout in UFC history (0:17) (vs. Alessio Di Chirico)

== Mixed martial arts record ==
Professional record breakdown
20 matches	12 wins	7 losses
By knockout	12	2
By submission	0	1
By decision	0	4
No contests	1	

Res.	Record	Opponent	Method	Event	Date	Round	Time	Location	Notes
Loss	12–7 (1)	César Almeida	KO (punch)	UFC Fight Night: Dern vs. Ribas 2	January 11, 2025	1	4:19	Las Vegas, Nevada, United States	
NC	12–6 (1)	Cody Brundage	NC (illegal elbows)	UFC on ESPN: Namajunas vs. Cortez	July 13, 2024	1	0:37	Denver, Colorado, United States	Accidental elbows to the back of the head left Brundage unable to continue.
Loss	12–6	Joe Pyfer	Technical Submission (arm-triangle choke)	UFC Fight Night: Dawson vs. Green	October 7, 2023	2	2:05	Las Vegas, Nevada, United States	
Win	12–5	Claudio Ribeiro	KO (punches)	UFC Fight Night: Strickland vs. Imavov	January 14, 2023	2	0:28	Las Vegas, Nevada, United States	
Loss	11–5	Joaquin Buckley	Decision (split)	UFC Fight Night: Walker vs. Hill	February 19, 2022	3	5:00	Las Vegas, Nevada, United States	
Win	11–4	Alessio Di Chirico	KO (head kick)	UFC on ESPN: Barboza vs. Chikadze	August 28, 2021	1	0:17	Las Vegas, Nevada, United States	Performance of the Night.
Loss	10–4	Jacob Malkoun	Decision (unanimous)	UFC on ESPN: Whittaker vs. Gastelum	April 17, 2021	3	5:00	Las Vegas, Nevada, United States	Return to Middleweight.
Loss	10–3	Khaos Williams	KO (punch)	UFC Fight Night: Felder vs. dos Anjos	November 14, 2020	1	0:30	Las Vegas, Nevada, United States	Catchweight (172.5 lb) bout; Alhassan missed weight.
Loss	10–2	Mounir Lazzez	Decision (unanimous)	UFC on ESPN: Kattar vs. Ige	July 16, 2020	3	5:00	Abu Dhabi, United Arab Emirates	Catchweight (174 lb) bout; Alhassan missed weight.
Win	10–1	Niko Price	KO (punch)	UFC 228	September 8, 2018	1	0:43	Dallas, Texas, United States	
Win	9–1	Sabah Homasi	KO (punch)	UFC 220	January 20, 2018	1	3:47	Boston, Massachusetts, United States	Performance of the Night.
Win	8–1	Sabah Homasi	TKO (punches)	UFC 218	December 2, 2017	1	4:21	Detroit, Michigan, United States	
Loss	7–1	Omari Akhmedov	Decision (split)	UFC Fight Night: Gustafsson vs. Teixeira	May 28, 2017	3	5:00	Stockholm, Sweden	
Win	7–0	Charlie Ward	KO (punch)	UFC Fight Night: Mousasi vs. Hall 2	November 19, 2016	1	0:53	Belfast, Northern Ireland	Performance of the Night.
Win	6–0	Jos Eichelberger	TKO (punches)	Legacy FC 61	October 14, 2016	1	0:57	Dallas, Texas, United States	Catchweight (175 lb) bout.
Win	5–0	Ken Jackson	TKO (punches)	Rage in the Cage 47	August 13, 2016	1	0:40	Shawnee, Oklahoma, United States	Middleweight bout.
Win	4–0	Bryce Shepard-Mejia	KO (punch)	Bellator 143	September 25, 2015	1	1:26	Hidalgo, Texas, United States	Welterweight debut.
Win	3–0	Matt McKeon	TKO (punches)	Rocks Xtreme MMA 12	February 28, 2015	1	0:47	Harker Heights, Texas, United States	Middleweight debut.
Win	2–0	Matt Jones	TKO (punches)	Bellator 111	March 7, 2014	1	1:23	Thackerville, Oklahoma, United States	Catchweight (190 lb) bout.
Win	1–0	Kolby Adams	TKO (punches)	Xtreme Knockout 20	November 23, 2013	1	0:25	Arlington, Texas, United States	Catchweight (180 lb) bout.
