= Gabriel Green (fighter) =

American mixed martial arts fighter

- Born: May 2, 1993 (age 33); San Pedro, California, United States
- Other names: Gifted
- Height: 5 ft 10 in (1.78 m)
- Weight: 170 lb (77 kg; 12 st 2 lb)
- Division: Welterweight
- Reach: 73.0 in (185 cm)
- Fighting out of: San Pedro, California
- Team: Tracy Hess' Subfighter MMA (2014–present); Team Bodyshop
- Rank: Purple belt in Brazilian jiu-jitsu under Tracy Hess
- Years active: 2016–present

Mixed martial arts record
- Total: 17
- Wins: 12
- By knockout: 4
- By submission: 7
- By decision: 1
- Losses: 5
- By knockout: 3
- By decision: 2

Other information
- Mixed martial arts record from Sherdog

Gabriel Green (born May 2, 1993) is an American mixed martial artist who competes in the Welterweight division of the Ultimate Fighting Championship.

== Background ==
Coming from an athletic family, Green played football while attending Warren High School and had a boxing bag in his backyard where his father taught him to box. He would eventually join a gym after his friend suggested they try together and after two months had his first amateur bout. He would win his next six amateur bouts before going pro because of lack of opponents on the amateur scene.

Green attended California State University, Long Beach, where he earned his bachelor's degree in business despite starting out in the pre-med program.

== Mixed martial arts career ==
=== Early career ===
Having his debut in 2016, he compiled a 9–2 record before the UFC fighting mostly in California, winning the CXF 160 lb Championship in his last bout before his short notice bout in the UFC. He made 3 appearances in Bellator MMA, winning his first appearance at Bellator 160 against Alex Trinidad via second-round TKO, losing at Bellator 170 against fellow future UFC fighter Jalin Turner 36 seconds into the bout, and finally winning via second round rear-naked choke against Chris Padilla at Bellator 192.

=== Ultimate Fighting Championship ===
Green, replacing Kevin Holland, faced Daniel Rodriguez on May 30, 2020, at UFC Fight Night: Woodley vs. Burns. Green lost the fight via unanimous decision.

Green was scheduled to face Dwight Grant on October 23, 2021, at UFC Fight Night 196. However, Green was removed from the pairing on 23 September for undisclosed reasons and replaced by Francisco Trinaldo.

Green faced UFC newcomer Philip Rowe at UFC 258 on February 13, 2021. He won the bout via unanimous decision.

Green faced Yohan Lainesse on April 30, 2022, at UFC on ESPN: Font vs. Vera. Despite getting knocked down earlier, he won the fight via TKO in the second round.

Green faced Ian Garry on July 2, 2022 at UFC 276. He lost the bout via unanimous decision.

Green was scheduled to face Jake Matthews, at UFC on ABC 4 on May 13, 2023. However, Matthews withdrew from the bout due to injury and was replaced by Bryan Battle. At the weigh-ins, Battle weighed in at 173 pounds, two pounds over the welterweight non-title fight limit. The bout proceeded at catchweight and Battle was fined a percentage of his purse, which went to Green. Green lost the bout via knockout just 14 seconds into the bout.

Green was scheduled to face James Llontop, replacing Lando Vannata, on April 27, 2024 at UFC on ESPN 55. However, Green withdrew from the fight for unknown reasons and was replaced by newcomer Chris Padilla.

Green faced promotional newcomer Matheus Camilo on May 17, 2025 at UFC Fight Night 256. He won the fight via a rear-naked choke submission in the second round.

== Championships and accomplishments ==
- California Xtreme Fighting
  - CXF 160 lb Championship (One time; former)

== Mixed martial arts record ==
Professional record breakdown
17 matches	12 wins	5 losses
By knockout	4	3
By submission	7	0
By decision	1	2

Res.	Record	Opponent	Method	Event	Date	Round	Time	Location	Notes
Win	12–5	Matheus Camilo	Submission (face crank)	UFC Fight Night: Burns vs. Morales	May 17, 2025	2	3:43	Las Vegas, Nevada, United States	Return to Lightweight.
Loss	11–5	Bryan Battle	KO (punch)	UFC on ABC: Rozenstruik vs. Almeida	May 13, 2023	1	0:14	Charlotte, North Carolina, United States	Catchweight (173 lb) bout; Battle missed weight.
Loss	11–4	Ian Machado Garry	Decision (unanimous)	UFC 276	July 2, 2022	3	5:00	Las Vegas, Nevada, United States	
Win	11–3	Yohan Lainesse	TKO (punches)	UFC on ESPN: Font vs. Vera	April 30, 2022	2	4:02	Las Vegas, Nevada, United States	
Win	10–3	Philip Rowe	Decision (unanimous)	UFC 258	February 13, 2021	3	5:00	Las Vegas, Nevada, United States	
Loss	9–3	Daniel Rodriguez	Decision (unanimous)	UFC on ESPN: Woodley vs. Burns	May 30, 2020	3	5:00	Las Vegas, Nevada, United States	Return to Welterweight.
Win	9–2	Richard LeRoy	KO (punches)	California Xtreme Fighting 14	August 25, 2018	2	4:52	Studio City, California, United States	Won the vacant CXF 160 lb Championship.
Win	8–2	Javier Garcia	Technical Submission (rear-naked choke)	Combate 20	April 13, 2018	3	1:03	Los Angeles, California, United States	
Win	7–2	Chris Padilla	Technical Submission (rear-naked choke)	Bellator 192	January 20, 2018	1	2:46	Inglewood, California, United States	
Win	6–2	Ivan Castillo	Submission (rear-naked choke)	Extreme Fighters MMA Events 1	October 7, 2017	1	1:12	Long Beach, California, United States	
Win	5–2	Leon Shahbazyan	TKO (punches)	California Xtreme Fighting 8	June 17, 2017	1	3:23	Burbank, California, United States	Catchweight (165 lb) bout.
Win	4–2	Matt Hagge	Submission (rear-naked choke)	California Xtreme Fighting 7	April 29, 2017	1	3:20	Studio City, California, United States	Catchweight (166 lb) bout.
Loss	3–2	Jalin Turner	KO (punches)	Bellator 170	January 21, 2017	1	0:36	Inglewood, California, United States	
Loss	3–1	Randon Abafo	TKO (punches)	War on the Valley Isle 5	November 12, 2016	1	3:26	Wailuku, Hawaii, United States	Welterweight bout.
Win	3–0	Alex Trinidad	TKO (punches)	Bellator 160	August 26, 2016	2	2:01	Anaheim, California, United States	Return to Lightweight.
Win	2–0	Hakob Ter-Petrosyan	Submission (rear-naked choke)	Fight Club OC: Thursday Night Fights 33	June 9, 2016	1	4:13	Costa Mesa, California, United States	Welterweight debut.
Win	1–0	Andrew Lagdaan	Submission (rear-naked choke)	Fight Club OC: Thursday Night Fights 32	April 7, 2016	2	2:40	Costa Mesa, California, United States	Lightweight debut.

== See also ==
- List of current UFC fighters
- List of male mixed martial artists
