= UFC Fight Night: Dern vs. Hill =

UFC mixed martial arts event in 2023

- The poster for UFC Fight Night: Dern vs. Hill
- Promotion: Ultimate Fighting Championship
- Date: May 20, 2023
- Venue: UFC Apex
- City: Enterprise, Nevada, United States
- Attendance: Not announced

Event chronology
UFC on ABC: Rozenstruik vs. Almeida	UFC Fight Night: Dern vs. Hill	UFC on ESPN: Kara-France vs. Albazi

UFC Fight Night: Dern vs. Hill (also known as UFC Fight Night 223, UFC Vegas 73, and UFC on ESPN+ 81) was a mixed martial arts event produced by the Ultimate Fighting Championship that took place on May 20, 2023, at the UFC Apex facility in Enterprise, Nevada, part of the Las Vegas Metropolitan Area, United States.

== Background ==
A women's bantamweight rematch between former UFC Women's Bantamweight Championship challenger Raquel Pennington and Irene Aldana was expected to headline the event. The pair previously met at UFC on ESPN: dos Anjos vs. Edwards in 2019 which Pennington won by split decision. They were also briefly expected to headline UFC on ESPN: Vera vs. Sandhagen, but the bout never materialized. In turn, Aldana was pulled from the contest in early May in order to serve as a replacement in a UFC Women's Bantamweight Championship bout against current champion Amanda Nunes at UFC 289. Pennington will serve as a backup for that event.

As a result, a women's strawweight bout between Mackenzie Dern and former Invicta FC Strawweight Champion Angela Hill was moved from UFC on ABC: Rozenstruik vs. Almeida one week prior to instead headline this event.

A women's strawweight bout between former Invicta FC Strawweight Champion Emily Ducote and Polyana Viana was originally scheduled for UFC Fight Night: Song vs. Simón. The pairing was eventually rescheduled for this event for undisclosed reasons. In turn, Viana withdrew from the bout and was replaced by former LFA Women's Strawweight Champion Lupita Godinez at a catchweight of 120 pounds.

A middleweight bout between Abdul Razak Alhassan and Brunno Ferreira was expected to take place at this event. However, the bout was moved to UFC on ESPN: Strickland vs. Magomedov for unknown reasons.

A flyweight bout between Clayton Carpenter and Stephen Erceg was expected to take place at this event, but it was postponed due Erceg having visa issues.

At the weigh-ins, Vanessa Demopoulos and Orion Cosce missed weight. Demopoulos weighed in at 117.5 pounds and Cosce weighed in at 172.5 pounds, both one and half pounds over the women's strawweight and welterweight non-title fights limit respectively. Both bouts proceeded at catchweight with both being fined 20 percent of their purses, which went to their opponents: former UFC Women's Strawweight Championship challenger (also former KSW Women's Flyweight Champion) Karolina Kowalkiewicz and Gilbert Urbina respectively.

== Results ==
Main Card (ESPN+)
Weight class				Method	Round	Time	Notes
Women's Strawweight	Mackenzie Dern	def.	Angela Hill	Decision (unanimous) (49–43, 49–44, 49–44)	5	5:00
Middleweight	Anthony Hernandez	def.	Edmen Shahbazyan	TKO (elbows and punches)	3	1:01
Catchweight (120 lb)	Lupita Godinez	def.	Emily Ducote	Decision (unanimous) (30–27, 29–28, 29–28)	3	5:00
Welterweight	Joaquin Buckley	def.	André Fialho	TKO (head kick)	2	4:15
Lightweight	Carlos Diego Ferreira	def.	Michael Johnson	KO (punch)	2	1:50
Preliminary Card (ESPN+)
Lightweight	Viacheslav Borshchev	def.	Hayisaer Maheshate	TKO (punches)	2	2:37
Catchweight (117.5 lb)	Karolina Kowalkiewicz	def.	Vanessa Demopoulos	Decision (unanimous) (30–27, 30–27, 30–27)	3	5:00
Catchweight (172.5 lb)	Gilbert Urbina	def.	Orion Cosce	TKO (front kick and knees)	2	2:55
Heavyweight	Rodrigo Nascimento	def.	Ilir Latifi	Decision (split) (29–28, 28–29, 29–28)	3	5:00
Lightweight	Chase Hooper	def.	Nick Fiore	Decision (unanimous) (30–26, 30–27, 30–27)	3	5:00
Women's Flyweight	Natália Silva	def.	Victoria Leonardo	TKO (punches and head kick)	1	2:58
Welterweight	Themba Gorimbo	def.	Takashi Sato	Decision (unanimous) (30–27, 30–27, 30–27)	3	5:00

== Bonus awards ==
The following fighters received $50,000 bonuses.

- Fight of the Night: Mackenzie Dern vs. Angela Hill
- Performance of the Night: Carlos Diego Ferreira and Viacheslav Borschev

== See also ==
- List of UFC events
- List of current UFC fighters
- 2023 in UFC
