= UFC Fight Night: Dawson vs. Green =

2023 mixed martial event in Nevada, US

- The poster for UFC Fight Night: Dawson vs. Green
- Promotion: Ultimate Fighting Championship
- Date: October 7, 2023
- Venue: UFC Apex
- City: Enterprise, Nevada, United States
- Attendance: Not announced

Event chronology
UFC Fight Night: Fiziev vs. Gamrot	UFC Fight Night: Dawson vs. Green	UFC Fight Night: Yusuff vs. Barboza

UFC Fight Night: Dawson vs. Green (also known as UFC Fight Night 229, UFC on ESPN+ 87 and UFC Vegas 80) was a mixed martial arts event produced by the Ultimate Fighting Championship that took place on October 7, 2023, at the UFC Apex facility in Enterprise, Nevada, part of the Las Vegas Metropolitan Area, United States.

== Background ==
A lightweight bout between Grant Dawson and Bobby Green headlined the event.

A featherweight bout between Daniel Pineda and Khusein Askhabov was scheduled for this event. However on September 11, Askhabov was arrested after being connected to a kidnap and torture crime in Thailand and the bout was cancelled.

A women's flyweight bout between Montana De La Rosa and Stephanie Egger was expected to take place at the event. However, Egger pulled out due to undisclosed reasons and was replaced by JJ Aldrich.

A bantamweight bout between Chris Gutiérrez and Montel Jackson was expected to take place at the event. However, Jackson withdrew for unknown reasons and Gutiérrez was instead scheduled to face Alateng Heili one week later at UFC Fight Night: Yusuff vs. Barboza.

A light heavyweight between Ion Cuțelaba and Philipe Lins was expected to take place at the event. However, the bout was cancelled the day of the event for unknown reasons.

== Results ==
Fight card (ESPN+)
Weight class				Method	Round	Time	Notes
Lightweight	Bobby Green	def.	Grant Dawson	KO (punches)	1	0:33
Middleweight	Joe Pyfer	def.	Abdul Razak Alhassan	Technical Submission (arm-triangle choke)	2	2:05
Welterweight	Joaquin Buckley	def.	Alex Morono	Decision (unanimous) (30–27, 30–27, 30–26)	3	5:00
Lightweight	Drew Dober	def.	Ricky Glenn	TKO (punches)	1	2:36
Featherweight	Bill Algeo	def.	Alexander Hernandez	Decision (unanimous) (30–27, 30–27, 30–27)	3	5:00
Preliminary card (ESPN+)
Women's Strawweight	Karolina Kowalkiewicz	def.	Diana Belbiţă	Decision (unanimous) (30–27, 30–27, 30–27)	3	5:00
Flyweight	Nate Maness	def.	Mateus Mendonça	TKO (punches)	1	4:40
Women's Strawweight	Vanessa Demopoulos	def.	Kanako Murata	Decision (unanimous) (29–28, 29–28, 29–28)	3	5:00
Bantamweight	Aori Qileng	def.	Johnny Muñoz Jr.	Decision (unanimous) (29–28, 29–28, 29–28)	3	5:00
Women's Flyweight	JJ Aldrich	def.	Montana De La Rosa	Decision (unanimous) (30–27, 30–27, 30–27)	3	5:00

== Bonus awards ==
The following fighters received $50,000 bonuses.

- Fight of the Night: No bonus awarded.
- Performance of the Night: Bobby Green, Joe Pyfer, Drew Dober, and Nate Maness

== See also ==
- List of UFC events
- List of current UFC fighters
- 2023 in UFC
