= Jacob Malkoun =

Australian mixed martial arts fighter

- Born: August 26, 1995 (age 31); Sydney, Australia
- Other names: Mamba
- Height: 5 ft 9 in (1.75 m)
- Weight: 185 lb (84 kg; 13 st 3 lb)
- Division: Middleweight
- Reach: 73 in (185 cm)
- Style: Boxing, BJJ
- Fighting out of: Sydney, New South Wales, Australia
- Team: Gracie Jiu Jitsu Smeaton Grange
- Rank: Black belt in Brazilian Jiu Jitsu
- Years active: 2017–present

Mixed martial arts record
- Total: 14
- Wins: 10
- By knockout: 3
- By decision: 7
- Losses: 4
- By knockout: 1
- By decision: 2
- By disqualification: 1

Other information
- Mixed martial arts record from Sherdog

Jacob Malkoun (born August 26, 1995) is an Australian mixed martial artist who competes in the Middleweight division of the Ultimate Fighting Championship.

== Background ==
At the age of 16, Malkoun started training in martial arts after his father put him in a local boxing gym to shed some his 115 kg Rugby League Prop’s frame where he trains with former UFC Middleweight champion Robert Whittaker. Malkoun is an ADCC Asia 2019 Trials winner and a 2019 Pan Pacific Gold Medalist. He also has a 3–0 record as a Pro Boxer.

== Mixed martial arts career ==
=== Early career ===
Debuting in 2017, Malkoun compiled a 4–0 record on the regional Australian scene, winning his debut against Cam Rowston at BRACE 47 via unanimous decision. He would go on to win his next two bouts by the way off TKO; against Ryan Heketa at Hex Fight Series 17 and Christophe Van Dijk at Wollongong Wars 7. In his last bout on the regional scene, he defeated Sebastian Temesi at Eternal MMA 48 via unanimous decision.

=== Ultimate Fighting Championship ===
Malkoun made his UFC debut at UFC 254 on October 24, 2020, against Phil Hawes. Malkoun lost the fight via knockout 18 seconds into round one.

Malkoun faced Abdul Razak Alhassan on April 17, 2021, at UFC on ESPN 22. He won the fight via unanimous decision.

Malkoun faced AJ Dobson on February 12, 2022, at UFC 271. He won the fight via unanimous decision.

Malkoun faced Brendan Allen on June 11, 2022, at UFC 275. He lost the bout via unanimous decision.

Malkoun faced Nick Maximov on October 15, 2022, at UFC Fight Night 212. He won the fight via unanimous decision.

Malkoun was scheduled to face Aliaskhab Khizriev on September 23, 2023, at UFC Fight Night 228. However, Khizriev was pulled from the event for undisclosed reasons, and he was replaced by newcomer Robert Bryczek. Bryczek was then in turn replaced by Cody Brundage. Malkoun lost the fight via disqualification in the first round, rendering Brundage unable to continue after an illegal elbow to the back of Brundage's head.

Malkoun faced Andre Petroski on March 30, 2024, at UFC on ESPN 54. He won the fight via technical knockout in round two.

Malkoun was scheduled to face Rodolfo Vieira on February 15, 2025, at UFC Fight Night 251. However, Malkoun withdrew from the fight due to an undisclosed injury.

Malkoun faced Torrez Finney on February 1, 2026, at UFC 325. He won the fight by unanimous decision.

Malkoun faced Gerald Meerschaert on May 2, 2026, at UFC Fight Night 275. At the weigh-ins, Meerschaert weighed in at 190 pounds, 4 pounds over the middleweight non-title fight limit. The bout proceeded at catchweight and Meerschaert was fined 30 percent of his purse, which went to Malkoun. He won the fight via unanimous decision.

Malkoun faced Abubakar Vagaev on October 24, 2026 at UFC 333. He lost the fight by unanimous decision.

== Personal life ==
Malkoun's moniker "Mamba" is after the late NBA Lakers player Kobe Bryant.

Malkoun works as a Jiu Jitsu instructor at Gracie Jiu Jitsu Smeaton Grange in Sydney, Australia.

== Championships and accomplishments ==
=== Grappling ===
- 2019: ADCC Asian & Oceanic Championship - 1st place in 99 kg class (Tokyo)

== Mixed martial arts record ==
Professional record breakdown
14 matches	10 wins	4 losses
By knockout	3	1
By decision	7	2
By disqualification	0	1

Res.	Record	Opponent	Method	Event	Date	Round	Time	Location	Notes
Loss	10–4	Abubakar Vagaev	Decision (unanimous)	UFC 333	October 24, 2026	3	5:00	Abu Dhabi, United Arab Emirates	
Win	10–3	Gerald Meerschaert	Decision (unanimous)	UFC Fight Night: Della Maddalena vs. Prates	May 2, 2026	3	5:00	Perth, Australia	Catchweight (190 lb) bout; Meerschaert missed weight.
Win	9–3	Torrez Finney	Decision (unanimous)	UFC 325	February 1, 2026	3	5:00	Sydney, Australia	
Win	8–3	Andre Petroski	TKO (soccer kick to the body)	UFC on ESPN: Blanchfield vs. Fiorot	March 30, 2024	2	0:39	Atlantic City, New Jersey, United States	
Loss	7–3	Cody Brundage	DQ (illegal elbow)	UFC Fight Night: Fiziev vs. Gamrot	September 23, 2023	1	4:15	Las Vegas, Nevada, United States	An illegal elbow to the back of the head rendered Brundage unable to continue.
Win	7–2	Nick Maximov	Decision (unanimous)	UFC Fight Night: Grasso vs. Araújo	October 15, 2022	3	5:00	Las Vegas, Nevada, United States	
Loss	6–2	Brendan Allen	Decision (unanimous)	UFC 275	June 11, 2022	3	5:00	Kallang, Singapore	
Win	6–1	A.J. Dobson	Decision (unanimous)	UFC 271	February 12, 2022	3	5:00	Houston, Texas, United States	
Win	5–1	Abdul Razak Alhassan	Decision (unanimous)	UFC on ESPN: Whittaker vs. Gastelum	April 17, 2021	3	5:00	Las Vegas, Nevada, United States	
Loss	4–1	Phil Hawes	KO (punches)	UFC 254	October 24, 2020	1	0:18	Abu Dhabi, United Arab Emirates	
Win	4–0	Sebastian Temesi	Decision (unanimous)	Eternal MMA 48	October 4, 2019	3	5:00	Melbourne, Australia	
Win	3–0	Christophe Van Dijk	TKO (punches)	Wollongong Wars 7	July 12, 2019	3	3:31	Wollongong, Australia	
Win	2–0	Ryan Heketa	TKO (punches)	Hex Fight Series 17	October 26, 2018	1	1:32	Sydney, Australia	
Win	1–0	Cameron Rowston	Decision (unanimous)	BRACE 47	March 18, 2017	3	5:00	Sydney, Australia	Middleweight debut.

== See also ==
- List of current UFC fighters
- List of male mixed martial artists
