= Nick Maximov =

American mixed martial arts fighter

- Born: December 23, 1997 (age 28); Bend, Oregon, U.S.
- Height: 6 ft 0 in (1.83 m)
- Weight: 185 lb (84 kg; 13 st 3 lb)
- Division: Middleweight
- Reach: 76 in (193 cm)
- Fighting out of: Stockton, California
- Team: Nick Diaz Academy
- Years active: 2018–present

Mixed martial arts record
- Total: 18
- Wins: 15
- By knockout: 4
- By submission: 4
- By decision: 7
- Losses: 2
- By submission: 1
- By decision: 1
- No contests: 1

Other information
- Mixed martial arts record from Sherdog

Nick Maximov (born December 23, 1997) is an American mixed martial artist who competed in the Middleweight division of the Ultimate Fighting Championship.

== Background ==
Starting out with karate and taekwondo at the age of 11, he then took on jiu-jitsu. Maximov wrestled while in high school, having a very successful run on the Chico High School wrestling team, with 137 wins against 37 losses. He would continue wrestling while attending college, first wrestling for Clackamas Community College and, briefly, at Oregon State. He earned NJCAA All-American honors during his second season at Clackamas Community College.

Through an introduction through his father being friends with a training partner of the Diaz brothers, Nick started training at Nate Diaz Academy in Stockton.

== Mixed martial arts career ==
=== Early career ===
Making his MMA professional debut at KOTC Terminal Velocity, he defeated Nick Piecuch via TKO in the first round, followed by a second round kimura at Hard Fought Championships 1 against Bruno Casillas. He would go on to defeat William Hope via TKO in round one at Iron Pit Promotions High Desert Brawl 14, before picking up a rear-naked submission in the first round at KOTC Return to Order.

Maximov faced Johnny James Jr. at LFA 91. He won the bout via rear-naked choke in the second round.

Maximov was scheduled to face Matheus Scheffel in a Light Heavyweight bout at Dana White's Contender Series 36 on November 17, 2020. However, Scheffel pulled out of the bout and was scheduled at Heavyweight against Oscar Cota, who also had his opponent pull out. He won the fight via unanimous decision, however wasn't awarded a UFC contract.

=== Ultimate Fighting Championship ===
In June 2021, it was announced that Maximov had signed with the UFC.

Maximov was scheduled to make his UFC debut against Karl Roberson on September 25, 2021, at UFC 266. However, due to medical issues Roberson was forced to withdraw from the event and he was replaced by promotional newcomer Cody Brundage. Maximov won his debut via unanimous decision.

In his sophomore performance, Maximov faced Punahele Soriano on February 5, 2022, at UFC Fight Night 200. He won the fight via split decision. 12 out of 16 media scores gave it to Maximov.

Maximov faced Andre Petroski at UFC on ESPN: Błachowicz vs. Rakić on May 14, 2022. Maximov lost the bout after getting choked out in the first round via an anaconda choke submission.

Maximov faced Jacob Malkoun on October 15, 2022, at UFC Fight Night 212. He lost the fight via unanimous decision.

In late October 2022, it was reported that Maximov was released by the UFC.

=== Post-UFC Career ===
In his first fight since leaving the UFC, Maximov faced TUF 23 veteran Elias Urbina at Fury FC 95 on August 2, 2024. He would win the fight via submission in the first round.

=== Professional Fighters League ===
On April 12, 2025, it was announced that Maximov signed with Professional Fighters League and he was scheduled to making his PFL debut against Khalid Murtazaliev in an alternate bout on April 18, 2025, at PFL 3. However, the bout was removed from the event after Maximov withdrew.

== Mixed martial arts record ==
Professional record breakdown
18 matches	15 wins	2 losses
By knockout	4	0
By submission	4	1
By decision	7	1
No contests	1	

Res.	Record	Opponent	Method	Event	Date	Round	Time	Location	Notes
Win	15–2 (1)	Wildemar Santos	Decision (unanimous)	LFA 243	October 9, 2026	3	5:00	Santa Cruz, California, United States	Light Heavyweight bout.
Win	14–2 (1)	Buddy Wallace	TKO (punches)	Urijah Faber's A1 Combat 34	March 27, 2026	1	1:21	Wheatland, California, United States	Defended the A1 Combat Middleweight Championship.
NC	13–2 (1)	Buddy Wallace	NC (accidental eye poke)	Urijah Faber's A1 Combat 33	January 30, 2026	1	2:22	Wheatland, California, United States	Retained the A1 Combat Middleweight Championship. Accidental eye poke rendered Maximov unable to continue.
Win	13–2	Renato Valente	Decision (unanimous)	Urijah Faber's A1 Combat 29	August 1, 2025	3	5:00	Wheatland, California, United States	Defended the A1 Combat Middleweight Championship.
Win	12–2	Handesson Ferreira	TKO (punches)	559 Fights 115	June 14, 2025	1	1:07	Porterville, California, United States	
Win	11–2	Said-Magomed Abdulgaziev	Decision (unanimous)	Urijah Faber's A1 Combat 26	February 8, 2025	3	5:00	Wheatland, California, United States	Catchweight (195 lb) bout.
Win	10–2	Kevem Felipe	Decision (unanimous)	Urijah Faber's A1 Combat 25	November 15, 2024	3	5:00	Wheatland, California, United States	Won the A1 Combat Middleweight Championship.
Win	9–2	Elias Urbina	Submission (rear-naked choke)	Fury FC 95	August 2, 2024	1	4:27	Dallas, Texas, United States	
Loss	8–2	Jacob Malkoun	Decision (unanimous)	UFC Fight Night: Grasso vs. Araújo	October 15, 2022	3	5:00	Las Vegas, Nevada, United States	
Loss	8–1	Andre Petroski	Technical Submission (anaconda choke)	UFC on ESPN: Błachowicz vs. Rakić	May 14, 2022	1	1:16	Las Vegas, Nevada, United States	
Win	8–0	Punahele Soriano	Decision (split)	UFC Fight Night: Hermansson vs. Strickland	February 5, 2022	3	5:00	Las Vegas, Nevada, United States	
Win	7–0	Cody Brundage	Decision (unanimous)	UFC 266	September 25, 2021	3	5:00	Las Vegas, Nevada, United States	Middleweight debut.
Win	6–0	Oscar Cota	Decision (unanimous)	Dana White's Contender Series 36	November 17, 2020	3	5:00	Las Vegas, Nevada, United States	Heavyweight debut.
Win	5–0	Johnny James Jr.	Submission (rear-naked choke)	LFA 91	September 11, 2020	2	4:01	Sioux Falls, South Dakota, United States	
Win	4–0	Robert Allensworth	Submission (rear-naked choke)	KOTC: Return to Order	January 11, 2020	1	1:37	Oroville, California, United States	
Win	3–0	William Hope	TKO (punches)	High Desert Brawl 14	August 10, 2019	1	1:35	Susanville, California, United States	
Win	2–0	Bruno Casillas	Submission (kimura)	Hard Fought Productions 1	July 27, 2019	2	3:44	Redding, California, United States	Light Heavyweight debut.
Win	1–0	Nick Piecuch	TKO (punches)	KOTC: Terminal Velocity	October 6, 2018	1	0:23	Oroville, California, United States	Catchweight (195 lb) bout.

== See also ==
- List of male mixed martial artists
