= UFC on ESPN: Usman vs. Buckley =

Mixed martial arts event in 2025

- The poster for UFC on ESPN: Usman vs. Buckley
- Promotion: Ultimate Fighting Championship
- Date: June 14, 2025
- Venue: State Farm Arena
- City: Atlanta, Georgia, United States
- Attendance: 17,204
- Total gate: $3,239,744

Event chronology
UFC 316: Dvalishvili vs O'Malley 2	UFC on ESPN: Usman vs. Buckley	UFC on ABC: Hill vs. Rountree Jr.

UFC on ESPN: Usman vs. Buckley (also known as UFC on ESPN 69) was a mixed martial arts event produced by the Ultimate Fighting Championship that took place on June 14, 2025, at the State Farm Arena in Atlanta, Georgia, United States.

== Background ==
The event marked the promotion's fifth visit to Atlanta and first since UFC 236 in April 2019.

A welterweight bout between former UFC Welterweight Champion (also The Ultimate Fighter: American Top Team vs. Blackzilians welterweight winner) Kamaru Usman and Joaquin Buckley headlined the event.

A light heavyweight bout between Alonzo Menifield and Oumar Sy took place for this event. They were previously scheduled to meet at UFC Fight Night: Edwards vs. Brady in March but Sy had to withdraw due to an injury.

A light heavyweight bout between Paul Craig and former interim LFA Light Heavyweight Champion Rodolfo Bellato took place at this event. They were originally scheduled to compete at UFC Fight Night: Burns vs. Morales one month prior, but the bout was cancelled during the event as a result of Bellato having a herpes infection.

A women's flyweight bout between former LFA Women's Flyweight Champion Jamey-Lyn Horth and Tereza Bledá was scheduled for this event. However, Bledá withdrew from the fight due to a staph infection and was replaced by former LFA Women's Strawweight Champion Vanessa Demopoulos.

Ricky Simón was scheduled to face Charles Jourdain in a bantamweight bout at this event. However, Jourdain withdrew during fight week due to an eye injury and was replaced by Cameron Smotherman.

== Results ==
Main card (ESPN / ESPN+)
Weight class				Method	Round	Time	Notes
Welterweight	Kamaru Usman	def.	Joaquin Buckley	Decision (unanimous) (49–46, 49–46, 48–47)	5	5:00
Women's Flyweight	Rose Namajunas	def.	Miranda Maverick	Decision (unanimous) (30–27, 30–27, 29–28)	3	5:00
Middleweight	Edmen Shahbazyan	def.	Andre Petroski	Decision (unanimous) (30–27, 30–27, 29–28)	3	5:00
Bantamweight	Raoni Barcelos	def.	Cody Garbrandt	Decision (unanimous) (29–28, 29–28, 29–28)	3	5:00
Middleweight	Mansur Abdul-Malik	vs.	Cody Brundage	Draw (majority) (19–19, 19–19, 18–20)	3	0:36	(Note: Originally a technical decision (30–27, 29–28, 29–28) win for Abdul-Malik due to an accidental clash of heads rendering Brundage unable to continue. Overturned in accordance with GAEC regulations which prohibit scoring incomplete rounds. The judges' scores for the two completed rounds were 19–19, 19–19, and 18–20.)
Light Heavyweight	Alonzo Menifield	def.	Oumar Sy	Decision (unanimous) (29–28, 29–28, 29–28)	3	5:00
Preliminary card (ESPN+)
Light Heavyweight	Paul Craig	vs.	Rodolfo Bellato	No Contest (illegal upkick)	1	4:59	(Note: An accidental illegal upkick rendered Bellato unable to continue.)
Welterweight	Michael Chiesa	def.	Court McGee	Decision (unanimous) (30–27, 30–27, 29–28)	3	5:00
Bantamweight	Malcolm Wellmaker	def.	Kris Moutinho	KO (punch)	1	2:37
Flyweight	Jose Ochoa	def.	Cody Durden	KO (punches)	2	0:11
Bantamweight	Ricky Simón	def.	Cameron Smotherman	Decision (unanimous) (30–27, 30–27, 29–28)	3	5:00
Welterweight	Philip Rowe	def.	Ange Loosa	TKO (punches)	3	4:03
Women's Flyweight	Jamey-Lyn Horth	def.	Vanessa Demopoulos	Decision (unanimous) (30–27, 30–27, 30–27)	3	5:00

== Bonus awards ==
The following fighters received $50,000 bonuses.

- Fight of the Night: Kamaru Usman vs. Joaquin Buckley
- Performance of the Night: Malcolm Wellmaker and Jose Ochoa

== Reported payout ==
The following is the reported payout to the fighters as reported to the Georgia Athletic and Entertainment Commission. The amounts do not include sponsor money, discretionary bonuses, viewership points, or additional earnings.

- Kamaru Usman: $300,000 (no win bonus) def. Joaquin Buckley: $150,000
- Rose Namajunas: $500,000 (includes $250,000 win bonus) def. Miranda Maverick: $125,000
- Edmen Shabazyan: $186,000 (includes $93,000 win bonus) def. Andre Petroski: $100,000
- Raoni Barcelos: $102,000 (includes $51,000 win bonus) def. Cody Garbrandt: $275,000
- Mansur Abdul-Malik: $28,000 (includes $14,000 win bonus) def. Cody Brundage: $65,000
- Alonzo Menifield: $250,000 (includes $125,000 win bonus) def. Oumar Sy: $26,000
- Paul Craig: $125,000 vs. Rodolfo Bellato: $12,000
- Michael Chiesa: $300,000 (includes $150,000 win bonus) def. Court McGee: $83,000
- Malcolm Wellmaker: $24,000 (includes $12,000 win bonus) def. Kris Moutinho: $14,000
- Jose Ochoa: $20,000 (includes $10,000 win bonus) def. Cody Durden: $63,000
- Ricky Simón: $166,000 (includes $83,000 win bonus) def. Cameron Smotherman: $14,000
- Phil Rowe: $110,000 (includes $55,000 win bonus) def. Ange Loosa: $30,000
- Jamey-Lyn Horth: $50,000 (includes $25,000 win bonus) def. Vanessa Demopoulos: $65,000

== Aftermath ==
On July 23, 2025, in response to an appeal filed by Cody Brundage, the Georgia Athletic and Entertainment Commission (GAEC) overturned the initial technical decision loss originally attributed to Brundage following a headbutt that rendered him unable to continue. The bout against Mansur Abdul-Malik was subsequently declared a majority draw, in accordance with GAEC regulations which prohibit scoring incomplete rounds. The judges' scores for the two completed rounds were 19–19, 19–19, and 18–20.

== See also ==
- 2025 in UFC
- List of current UFC fighters
- List of UFC events
