= Daniel Rodriguez (fighter) =

American mixed martial arts fighter

- Born: December 31, 1986 (age 39); Alhambra, California, U.S.
- Other names: D-Rod
- Height: 6 ft 0 in (183 cm)
- Weight: 170 lb (77 kg; 12 st 2 lb)
- Division: Middleweight; Welterweight (current); Lightweight
- Reach: 74 in (188 cm)
- Stance: Southpaw
- Fighting out of: Alhambra, California, U.S.
- Team: TapouT LA (formerly); The Yard Muay Thai; BMF Ranch (2019–present); Syndicate MMA (2021–present)
- Rank: Purple belt in Brazilian Jiu-Jitsu under Eddie Bravo
- Years active: 2015–present

Professional boxing record
- Total: 2
- Wins: 1
- Losses: 1
- By knockout: 1

Mixed martial arts record
- Total: 26
- Wins: 20
- By knockout: 9
- By submission: 4
- By decision: 7
- Losses: 6
- By knockout: 2
- By submission: 1
- By decision: 3

Other information
- Boxing record from BoxRec
- Mixed martial arts record from Sherdog

Daniel Rodriguez (born December 31, 1986) is an American mixed martial artist who currently competes in the Welterweight division of the Ultimate Fighting Championship. A professional since 2015, Rodriguez has also competed in Bellator, King of the Cage, and Combate Americas.

== Background ==
According to Rodriguez, he grew up in Los Angeles jail system while continuously getting into fights in both. Rodriguez estimates to have taken part in nearly 200 street fights, in which he claims to be undefeated. Without any sports background, Rodriguez began training boxing and eventually mixed martial arts in his mid-twenties.

== Mixed martial arts career ==
=== Early career ===
Rodriguez compiled a 7–0 amateur record as a Welterweight from late 2013 to 2015. Rodriguez later began his professional career in 2015, competing mainly in Combate Americas, with a one off fight at Bellator 170. Eventually racking up an 8–1 record, he competed on Dana White's Contender Series 22, however he did not earn a UFC contract through his unanimous decision win against Rico Farrington. According to Rodriguez, he was arrested and held in jail on a DUI charge shortly before his Contender Series fight and cites the moment as a turning point in his behavior, where he chose to prioritize his career over reckless behavior. Afterwards, he won the Smash Global Welterweight Championship, before he was given a UFC contract.

=== Ultimate Fighting Championship ===
Rodriguez made his promotional debut on February 15, 2020, at UFC Fight Night 167 as a late replacement for Ramazan Emeev against Tim Means. Rodriguez won the fight via submission in the second round. This win earned him the Performance of the Night award.

Rodriguez was expected to face Kevin Holland on May 30, 2020, at UFC Fight Night: Woodley vs. Burns. However, on May 26, Holland was forced to withdraw from his scheduled bout with Daniel Rodriguez due to an injury and he was replaced by promotional newcomer Gabriel Green. Rodriguez won the fight via unanimous decision.

Rodriguez was expected to face Takashi Sato on August 22, 2020, at UFC on ESPN 15. Despite making the required weight, Sato was not cleared to fight by Nevada State Athletic Commission medical personnel and he was replaced by Dwight Grant whose opponent, Calen Born, was pulled from the same event for undisclosed reason. After being knocked down in the beginning of the fight, Rodriguez knocked Grant down multiple times en route to a first-round knockout win.

Rodriguez was expected to face Bryan Barberena on November 14, 2020, at UFC Fight Night 183. However, Barberena underwent an emergency laparotomy a week before the event, resulting in the fight being cancelled.

Rodriguez instead faced Nicolas Dalby, replacing Orion Cosce, on November 21, 2020, at UFC 255. He lost the close fight via unanimous decision. 9 out of 20 media outlets scored the fight for Rodriguez.

Rodriguez faced Mike Perry on April 10, 2021, at UFC on ABC 2. He won the bout via unanimous decision.

Rodriguez was scheduled to face Abubakar Nurmagomedov on July 17, 2021, at UFC on ESPN 26. However, Nurmagomedov was forced to withdraw from the event, citing injury. He was replaced by promotional newcomer Preston Parsons. Rodriguez won the fight via technical knockout in round one.

Rodriguez faced Kevin Lee on August 28, 2021, at UFC on ESPN 30. He won the fight via unanimous decision.

Rodriguez was scheduled to face Kevin Holland on September 10, 2022, at UFC 279 in a 180-pound catchweight bout. However, the day of the weigh-ins, Khamzat Chimaev missed weight for his welterweight main event bout with Nate Diaz by seven-and-a-half pounds. As a result, the UFC was forced to change the card around. Rodriguez instead faced Li Jingliang, who was originally scheduled to face Tony Ferguson in the co-main event in a welterweight bout. Rodriguez's bout with Jingliang remained at a 180-pound catchweight. He won the back-and-forth fight via split decision. 21 out of 23 media scores gave it to Jingliang.

Rodriguez was scheduled to face Neil Magny on October 15, 2022, at UFC Fight Night 212. However, Rodriguez withdrew from the bout due to elbow infection. The bout was rescheduled for UFC Fight Night 214 on November 5. He lost the fight via D'Arce choke submission in the third round.

Rodriguez was scheduled to face Gunnar Nelson on March 18, 2023, at UFC 286. However, Rodriguez withdrew from the event for undisclosed reasons and he was replaced by Bryan Barberena.

Rodriguez faced Ian Garry on May 13, 2023, at UFC on ABC 4. He lost the bout via technical knockout in the first round.

Rodriguez was scheduled to face Santiago Ponzinibbio on September 16, 2023, at UFC Fight Night 227. However, Rodriguez was pulled from the bout by USADA after testing positive for the banned substance ostarine. He was given a 6-month suspension and will be eligible to fight again on January 28, 2024.

Rodriguez faced Kelvin Gastelum on June 22, 2024, at UFC on ABC 6. The bout was changed to a middleweight bout due to Gastelum having issues cutting weight. He lost the fight by unanimous decision.

Rodriguez faced Alex Morono on October 12, 2024, at UFC Fight Night 244. He won the fight by split decision.

Rodriguez faced Santiago Ponzinibbio on May 3, 2025, at UFC on ESPN 67. He won the fight by technical knockout in the third round.

Rodriguez faced Kevin Holland on July 19, 2025, at UFC 318. He won the fight by unanimous decision.

Rodriguez was scheduled to face former UFC Welterweight Champion Leon Edwards on July 11, 2026 at UFC 329. However, the fight did not come to fruition.

Rodriguez faced Uroš Medić on August 1, 2026 in the main event at UFC Fight Night 283. He lost the fight by technical knockout thirty seconds into the first round.

Rodriguez was scheduled to face Roberto Soldić on January 30, 2027 at UFC 336. However, for unspecified reasons, the bout was moved to UFC Fight Night 296 which is scheduled to take place on January 16, 2027.

== Personal life ==
In 2025, Rodriguez was arrested for possession of marijuana while trying to cross the Mexican-American border. He ended up serving eight months in a Mexican jail, and was released in April 2026. According to Rodriguez, he initially shared a bedbug-infested room with 20 other inmates until he was able to bribe his way into a nicer room. His new cellmate was a cartel head, who enjoyed special amenities in prison and used Rodriguez as his personal protection. Upon release, Rodriguez discussed his incarceration as "the most horrible situation you can think of," especially complaining about the food and inefficiency of the Mexican judicial system. Rodriguez claimed he was arrested for possession of less than an ounce of marijuana, and speculated that Mexican authorities treated him harshly in order to make an example out of him in light of recent Mexican-American tensions. Rodriguez credits Mexican MMA fighters Yair Rodriguez and Brian Ortega for supporting him during his incarceration.

== Championships and accomplishments ==
=== Mixed martial arts ===
- SMASH Global
  - SMASH Global Welterweight Championship (One time)
- Ultimate Fighting Championship
  - Performance of the Night (One time) vs. Tim Means
  - UFC Honors Awards
    - 2020: Fan's Choice Comeback of the Year Nominee vs. Dwight Grant
  - UFC.com Awards
    - 2020: Ranked #7 Upset of the Year vs. Tim Means

== Mixed martial arts record ==
Professional record breakdown
26 matches	20 wins	6 losses
By knockout	9	2
By submission	4	1
By decision	7	3

Res.	Record	Opponent	Method	Event	Date	Round	Time	Location	Notes
Loss	20–6	Uroš Medić	TKO (punches)	UFC Fight Night: Medić vs. Rodriguez	August 1, 2026	1	0:30	Belgrade, Serbia	
Win	20–5	Kevin Holland	Decision (unanimous)	UFC 318	July 19, 2025	3	5:00	New Orleans, Louisiana, United States	
Win	19–5	Santiago Ponzinibbio	TKO (punches)	UFC on ESPN: Sandhagen vs. Figueiredo	May 3, 2025	3	1:12	Des Moines, Iowa, United States	
Win	18–5	Alex Morono	Decision (split)	UFC Fight Night: Royval vs. Taira	October 12, 2024	3	5:00	Las Vegas, Nevada, United States	
Loss	17–5	Kelvin Gastelum	Decision (unanimous)	UFC on ABC: Whittaker vs. Aliskerov	June 22, 2024	3	5:00	Riyadh, Saudi Arabia	Middleweight bout.
Loss	17–4	Ian Machado Garry	TKO (head kick and punches)	UFC on ABC: Rozenstruik vs. Almeida	May 13, 2023	1	2:57	Charlotte, North Carolina, United States	
Loss	17–3	Neil Magny	Submission (brabo choke)	UFC Fight Night: Rodriguez vs. Lemos	November 5, 2022	3	3:33	Las Vegas, Nevada, United States	
Win	17–2	Li Jingliang	Decision (split)	UFC 279	September 10, 2022	3	5:00	Las Vegas, Nevada, United States	Catchweight (180 lb) bout.
Win	16–2	Kevin Lee	Decision (unanimous)	UFC on ESPN: Barboza vs. Chikadze	August 28, 2021	3	5:00	Las Vegas, Nevada, United States	
Win	15–2	Preston Parsons	TKO (punches)	UFC on ESPN: Makhachev vs. Moisés	July 17, 2021	1	3:47	Las Vegas, Nevada, United States	
Win	14–2	Mike Perry	Decision (unanimous)	UFC on ABC: Vettori vs. Holland	April 10, 2021	3	5:00	Las Vegas, Nevada, United States	
Loss	13–2	Nicolas Dalby	Decision (unanimous)	UFC 255	November 21, 2020	3	5:00	Las Vegas, Nevada, United States	
Win	13–1	Dwight Grant	KO (punches)	UFC on ESPN: Munhoz vs. Edgar	August 22, 2020	1	2:24	Las Vegas, Nevada, United States	
Win	12–1	Gabriel Green	Decision (unanimous)	UFC on ESPN: Woodley vs. Burns	May 30, 2020	3	5:00	Las Vegas, Nevada, United States	
Win	11–1	Tim Means	Submission (guillotine choke)	UFC Fight Night: Anderson vs. Błachowicz 2	February 15, 2020	2	3:37	Rio Rancho, New Mexico, United States	Performance of the Night.
Win	10–1	Quinton McCottrell	TKO (punches)	SMASH Global 9	December 19, 2019	2	1:48	Hollywood, California, United States	Won the SMASH Global Welterweight Championship.
Win	9–1	Rico Farrington	Decision (unanimous)	Dana White's Contender Series 22	July 30, 2019	3	5:00	Las Vegas, Nevada, United States	Return to Welterweight.
Win	8–1	Ivan Castillo	KO (knee)	Combate Americas 31	February 22, 2019	2	2:31	Fresno, California, United States	Catchweight (165 lb) bout.
Win	7–1	Ozzie Alvarez	TKO (punches)	Combate Americas 25	September 28, 2018	3	2:41	Long Beach, California, United States	Catchweight (165 lb) bout.
Win	6–1	Alex Velasco	Submission (rear-naked choke)	Combate Americas 23	May 18, 2018	3	2:41	Tijuana, Mexico	Lightweight debut.
Win	5–1	Justin Baesman	TKO (punches)	California Xtreme Fighting 11	February 17, 2018	2	1:17	Studio City, California, United States	
Loss	4–1	Victor Reyna	Decision (split)	Combate Americas 19	December 1, 2017	3	5:00	San Antonio, Texas, United States	
Win	4–0	Joel Champion	TKO (punches)	Combate Americas 13	April 20, 2017	1	1:55	Tucson, Arizona, United States	
Win	3–0	Christian Gonzalez	TKO (punches)	Bellator 170	January 21, 2017	2	3:55	Inglewood, California, United States	Catchweight (182 lb) bout.
Win	2–0	Hector Saldaña	Submission (arm-triangle choke)	Combate Americas 8	August 11, 2016	1	3:45	Los Angeles, California, United States	Welterweight debut.
Win	1–0	Christopher Gates	Submission (armbar)	KOTC: Sanctioned	June 14, 2015	1	4:54	San Jacinto, California, United States	Middleweight debut.

== Professional boxing record ==
2 fights	1 win	1 loss
By knockout	0	1
By decision	1	0

No.	Result	Record	Opponent	Type	Round, time	Date	Location	Notes
2	Loss	1–1	(United States) Lucius Johnson	KO	1 (4), 2:50	19 Sep 2015	(United States) Quiet Cannon, Montebello, California, US	
1	Win	1–0	(United States) Jonathan Scoggins	UD	4	8 Aug 2015	(United States) Quiet Cannon, Montebello, California, US	

== See also ==
- List of current UFC fighters
- List of Dana White's Contender Series alumni
- List of male mixed martial artists
