= Andre Petroski =

American mixed martial arts fighter (born 1991)

- Born: June 12, 1991 (age 35); Springfield, Pennsylvania, United States
- Height: 6 ft 0 in (183 cm)
- Weight: 186 lb (84 kg; 13 st 4 lb)
- Division: Welterweight (2018); Middleweight (2019–present)
- Reach: 73 in (185 cm)
- Team: 302 BJJ (2015–2019); Renzo Gracie Philly (2020–present)
- Rank: Black belt in Brazilian jiu-jitsu under Daniel Gracie
- Years active: 2018–present

Mixed martial arts record
- Total: 20
- Wins: 14
- By knockout: 5
- By submission: 4
- By decision: 5
- Losses: 6
- By knockout: 5
- By decision: 1

Other information
- Mixed martial arts record from Sherdog

Andre Petroski (born June 12, 1991) is an American mixed martial artist who competes in the Middleweight division of the Ultimate Fighting Championship.

== Background ==
Having wrestled since he was four years old, Petroski was a three-time state qualifier at Springfield High School. He then attended University of North Carolina at Chapel Hill for two years, transferred to Bloomsburg University of Pennsylvania and finalized his college career in Kutztown University of Pennsylvania, majoring in communications. While waiting for graduation, Petroski started training Brazilian jiu-jitsu and fell in love with the art.

Petroski battled a heroin addiction, before going clean in 2018.

== Mixed martial arts career ==
=== Early career ===
Petroski started training mixed martial arts in late 2015, took his first amateur bout in the following January and eventually turned pro in 2018. Making his professional debut at Art Of War Cage Fighting 8, Petroski faced Mark Krumine and went on win the bout via TKO in the first round. After winning his next two bout via first round submission, at Art Of War Cage Fighting 15, he faced Shedrick Goodridge for the AOW Middleweight Championship, winning via TKO in the second round. Petroski defended his title once against Andre Hall at AOW 16, before headlining LFA 93 against Aaron Jeffrey. He lost the first bout of his professional career, getting finished late in the second round.

Racking up a 5–1 record with a regional championship, Petroski was announced to be participating The Ultimate Fighter season 29 middleweight tournament.

=== The Ultimate Fighter ===
Petroski faced Aaron Phillips in the quarterfinal round, advancing to semifinals via first-round submission. In the semifinals Petroski was submitted in the second round by Bryan Battle and was eliminated from the tournament.

=== Ultimate Fighting Championship ===
Petroski was signed to the UFC and made his debut against fellow TUF alum Micheal Gillmore at UFC on ESPN 30 on August 28, 2021. He won the bout via third-round technical knockout.

Replacing Alen Amedovski on short notice, Petroski faced Hu Yaozong at UFC 267 on October 30, 2021. He won the bout at the end of the third round via arm-triangle choke.

Petroski faced Nick Maximov at UFC on ESPN 36 on May 14, 2022. Petroski won the bout after choking out Maximov in the first round via an anaconda choke submission.

Petroski faced Wellington Turman on November 12, 2022, at UFC 281. He won the fight via unanimous decision.

Petroski faced Gerald Meerschaert on August 19, 2023, at UFC 292. He won the bout via split decision.

Petroski faced Michel Pereira on October 14, 2023, at UFC Fight Night 230, replacing Marc-André Barriault, who withdrew due to medical issues. He lost the fight via technical knockout in the first round.

Petroski faced Jacob Malkoun on March 30, 2024, at UFC on ESPN 54. He lost the fight via technical knockout in round two.

Petroski faced Josh Fremd on July 13, 2024 at UFC on ESPN 59. He won the fight by unanimous decision.

Petroski faced Dylan Budka on September 7, 2024 at UFC Fight Night 242. At the weigh-ins, Budka weighed in at 188.5 pounds, two and a half pounds over the middleweight non-title fight limit. The bout proceeded at catchweight and Budka was fined 20 percent of his purse, which went to Petroski. Petroski won the fight by unanimous decision.

Petroski faced Rodolfo Vieira, replacing an injured Jacob Malkoun, on February 15, 2025 at UFC Fight Night 251. He won the fight by unanimous decision.

Petroski faced Edmen Shahbazyan on June 14, 2025 at UFC on ESPN 69. He lost the fight by unanimous decision.

Petroski faced Cameron Rowston on September 28, 2025 at UFC Fight Night 260. He lost the fight via technical knockout in round one.

Petroski faced Cody Brundage on May 16, 2026 at UFC Fight Night 276. He lost the fight by technical knockout in the second round.

Petroski was scheduled to face Azamat Bekoev on October 31, 2026 at UFC Fight Night 292. However, the bout was removed from the event due to Bekoev suffering a medical emergency and Petroski was rescheduled to compete against Mantas Kondratavičius on November 7, 2026, at UFC Fight Night 293. He won the fight via technical knockout in round two.

== Professional grappling career ==
Petroski was booked to compete against 10th Planet Jiu Jitsu black belt Rene Sousa in a superfight at Fury Pro Grappling 7 on May 27, 2023. He lost the match by submission, a straight ankle-lock.

Petroski competed against Alex Myers at Fury Pro Grappling 10 on May 24, 2024. He won the match by golden score in overtime.

Petroski competed against Pat Downey in the co-main event of Fury Pro Grappling 12 on December 28, 2024. He lost the match by golden score in overtime.

== Personal life ==
Petroski has a daughter. He has a tattoo of a hammer and sickle which pays homage to his great grandfather who hailed from the Soviet Union. He has stated that he's not a communist and that the hammer and sickle once had a different meaning before the symbol was appropriated by communists. Andre previously battled with heroin and opiate addiction and he’s been open about his struggles.

== Championships and accomplishments ==
- Art of War Cage Fighting
  - AOW Middleweight Championship (one time; former)
    - One successful title defense

== Mixed martial arts record ==
Professional record breakdown
20 matches	14 wins	6 losses
By knockout	5	5
By submission	4	0
By decision	5	1

Res.	Record	Opponent	Method	Event	Date	Round	Time	Location	Notes
Win	14–6	Mantas Kondratavičius	TKO (elbows and punches)	UFC Fight Night: Cortes-Acosta vs. Walker	November 7, 2026	2	4:39	Las Vegas, Nevada, United States	
Loss	13–6	Cody Brundage	TKO (punches)	UFC Fight Night: Allen vs. Costa	May 16, 2026	2	0:44	Las Vegas, Nevada, United States	
Loss	13–5	Cameron Rowston	TKO (punches)	UFC Fight Night: Ulberg vs. Reyes	September 28, 2025	1	2:41	Perth, Australia	
Loss	13–4	Edmen Shahbazyan	Decision (unanimous)	UFC on ESPN: Usman vs. Buckley	June 14, 2025	3	5:00	Atlanta, Georgia, United States	
Win	13–3	Rodolfo Vieira	Decision (unanimous)	UFC Fight Night: Cannonier vs. Rodrigues	February 15, 2025	3	5:00	Las Vegas, Nevada, United States	
Win	12–3	Dylan Budka	Decision (unanimous)	UFC Fight Night: Burns vs. Brady	September 7, 2024	3	5:00	Las Vegas, Nevada, United States	Catchweight (188.5 lb) bout; Budka missed weight.
Win	11–3	Josh Fremd	Decision (unanimous)	UFC on ESPN: Namajunas vs. Cortez	July 13, 2024	3	5:00	Denver, Colorado, United States	
Loss	10–3	Jacob Malkoun	TKO (soccer kick to the body)	UFC on ESPN: Blanchfield vs. Fiorot	March 30, 2024	2	0:39	Atlantic City, New Jersey, United States	
Loss	10–2	Michel Pereira	TKO (punches)	UFC Fight Night: Yusuff vs. Barboza	October 14, 2023	1	1:06	Las Vegas, Nevada, United States	
Win	10–1	Gerald Meerschaert	Decision (split)	UFC 292	August 19, 2023	3	5:00	Boston, Massachusetts, United States	
Win	9–1	Wellington Turman	Decision (unanimous)	UFC 281	November 12, 2022	3	5:00	New York City, New York, United States	
Win	8–1	Nick Maximov	Technical Submission (anaconda choke)	UFC on ESPN: Błachowicz vs. Rakić	May 14, 2022	1	1:16	Las Vegas, Nevada, United States	
Win	7–1	Hu Yaozong	Submission (arm-triangle choke)	UFC 267	October 30, 2021	3	4:46	Abu Dhabi, United Arab Emirates	
Win	6–1	Micheal Gillmore	TKO (punches and elbows)	UFC on ESPN: Barboza vs. Chikadze	August 28, 2021	3	3:12	Las Vegas, Nevada, United States	
Loss	5–1	Aaron Jeffery	TKO (knees and punches)	LFA 93	October 16, 2020	2	4:19	Park City, Kansas, United States	
Win	5–0	Andre Hall	TKO (punches)	Art of War Cage Fighting 16	February 7, 2020	2	3:37	Philadelphia, Pennsylvania, United States	Defended the Art of War Middleweight Championship.
Win	4–0	Shedrick Goodridge	TKO (punches)	Art of War Cage Fighting 15	December 13, 2019	2	5:00	Philadelphia, Pennsylvania, United States	Won the Art of War Middleweight Championship.
Win	3–0	Jesse James	Submission (kimura)	Art of War Cage Fighting 13	September 28, 2019	1	3:34	Philadelphia, Pennsylvania, United States	Catchweight (175 lb) bout.
Win	2–0	Ryan Parker	Submission (armbar)	Art of War Cage Fighting 12	May 11, 2019	1	1:56	Philadelphia, Pennsylvania, United States	Middleweight debut.
Win	1–0	Mark Krumrine	TKO (punches)	Art of War Cage Fighting 8	October 5, 2018	1	4:40	Philadelphia, Pennsylvania, United States	Welterweight debut.

=== Mixed martial arts exhibition record ===
Exhibition record breakdown		
2 matches	1 win	1 loss
By submission	1	1

Res.	Record	Opponent	Method	Event	Date	Round	Time	Location	Notes
Loss	1–1	Bryan Battle	Submission (guillotine choke)	The Return of The Ultimate Fighter: Team Volkanovski vs. Team Ortega	May 20, 2021 (airdate)	2	2:05	Las Vegas, Nevada, United States	The Ultimate Fighter 29 Middleweight semi-final round.
Win	1–0	Aaron Phillips	Submission (guillotine choke)	The Return of The Ultimate Fighter: Team Volkanovski vs. Team Ortega	April 29, 2021 (airdate)	1	4:42	Las Vegas, Nevada, United States	The Ultimate Fighter 29 Middleweight quarter-final round.

== See also ==
- List of current UFC fighters
- List of male mixed martial artists
