= UFC Fight Night: Fiziev vs. Gamrot =

2023 mixed martial event in Nevada, US

- Promotion: Ultimate Fighting Championship
- Date: September 23, 2023
- Venue: UFC Apex
- City: Enterprise, Nevada, United States
- Attendance: Not announced

Event chronology
UFC Fight Night: Grasso vs. Shevchenko 2	UFC Fight Night: Fiziev vs. Gamrot	UFC Fight Night: Dawson vs. Green

UFC Fight Night: Fiziev vs. Gamrot (also known as UFC Fight Night 228, UFC on ESPN+ 86 and UFC Vegas 79) was a mixed martial arts event produced by the Ultimate Fighting Championship that took place on September 23, 2023, at the UFC Apex facility in Enterprise, Nevada, part of the Las Vegas Metropolitan Area, United States.

== Background ==
A lightweight bout between Rafael Fiziev and former KSW Featherweight and Lightweight Champion Mateusz Gamrot headlined the event.

A heavyweight bout between promotional newcomer Valter Walker and Jake Collier was booked for this event. However, Walker withdrew due to an ankle injury. He was replaced by The Ultimate Fighter: Team Peña vs. Team Nunes heavyweight winner Mohammed Usman.

A flyweight bout between Bruno Gustavo da Silva and Cody Durden was expected for this event. However, Durden was instead scheduled to face Jake Hadley at UFC on ESPN: Sandhagen vs. Font and the bout was cancelled.

A middleweight bout between Aliaskhab Khizriev and Jacob Malkoun was scheduled for the event. However, Khizriev was pulled from the event for undisclosed reasons and was replaced by promotional newcomer Robert Bryczek. Bryczek then also pulled out of the fight and was replaced by Cody Brundage.

== Results ==
Main card (ESPN+)
Weight class				Method	Round	Time	Notes
Lightweight	Mateusz Gamrot	def.	Rafael Fiziev	TKO (knee injury)	2	2:03
Featherweight	Bryce Mitchell	def.	Dan Ige	Decision (unanimous) (30–27, 29–28, 29–28)	3	5:00
Women's Strawweight	Marina Rodriguez	def.	Michelle Waterson-Gomez	TKO (punches)	2	2:42
Welterweight	Bryan Battle	def.	AJ Fletcher	Submission (rear-naked choke)	2	4:32
Featherweight	Charles Jourdain	def.	Ricardo Ramos	Submission (guillotine choke)	1	3:12
Preliminary card (ESPN+)
Bantamweight	Dan Argueta	vs.	Miles Johns	No Contest (overturned)	3	5:00	(Note: Originally a unanimous decision win for Johns; overturned after he tested positive for turinabol.)
Welterweight	Tim Means	def.	André Fialho	TKO (punches)	3	1:15
Middleweight	Cody Brundage	def.	Jacob Malkoun	DQ (illegal elbow)	1	4:15	(Note: An illegal elbow to the back of the head rendered Brundage unable to continue.)
Heavyweight	Mohammed Usman	def.	Jake Collier	Decision (unanimous) (30–27, 29–28, 29–28)	3	5:00
Women's Strawweight	Mizuki Inoue	def.	Hannah Goldy	Decision (unanimous) (29–28, 29–28, 29–28)	3	5:00
Women's Bantamweight	Montserrat Rendon	def.	Tamires Vidal	Decision (split) (29–28, 28–29, 29–28)	3	5:00

== Bonus awards ==
The following fighters received $50,000 bonuses.

- Fight of the Night: Tim Means vs. André Fialho
- Performance of the Night: Marina Rodriguez and Charles Jourdain

== See also ==
- List of UFC events
- List of current UFC fighters
- 2023 in UFC
