= Takashi Sato =

Japanese mixed martial arts fighter

Takashi Satō
- Born: June 9, 1990 (age 36); Tokyo, Japan
- Other names: Ten
- Height: 186 cm (6.10 ft)
- Weight: 170 lb (77 kg; 12 st 2 lb)
- Division: Welterweight
- Reach: 73 in (185 cm)
- Style: Judo
- Stance: Southpaw
- Fighting out of: Tokyo, Japan
- Team: Tribe Tokyo MMA; Kill Cliff FC
- Trainer: Henri Hooft
- Rank: 2nd dan black belt in Judo
- Years active: 2013–present

Mixed martial arts record
- Total: 25
- Wins: 16
- By knockout: 11
- By submission: 2
- By decision: 3
- Losses: 9
- By knockout: 3
- By submission: 3
- By decision: 3

Other information
- University: Senshu University
- Mixed martial arts record from Sherdog

Takashi Satō (佐藤天, Satō Takashi; born June 9, 1990) is a Japanese mixed martial artist who competes in the Welterweight division. A professional since 2013, he is most notable for his time in the Ultimate Fighting Championship (UFC).

== Early life ==
Born to a Japanese father and Taiwanese mother, Sato grew up in Shinjuku, Tokyo, with his parents and older brother. He was a big fan of reading comics just like many other Japanese children. However one day, his older brother accidentally threw them all out. Sato says he cried the whole day until the following day his father felt very bad and came home from work with a new comic based on a kid becoming a judo champion. This then inspired Sato to pursue Judo and he used to train at the local police station.

== Mixed martial arts career ==
=== Japan ===
Sato started his MMA career fighting in various promotions in Japan. Sato then fought for Pancrase and Deep promotions in Japan. He earned a Pancrase title shot but lost to Glaico França. Sato earned the opportunity to fight in the UFC after beating former UFC fighter Matt Vaile.

=== Ultimate Fighter Championship ===
Sato signed with the UFC on April 2, 2019, and made his UFC debut on April 27, 2019, against Ben Saunders at UFC Fight Night: Jacaré vs. Hermansson. After being tagged by Saunders early, Sato won the fight by knockout.

Sato's next Fight was against Belal Muhammad on September 7, 2019, in the United Emirates at UFC 242. Sato lost by rear-naked choke in the third round.

Sato was scheduled to face Maki Pitolo at UFC Fight Night 168 on February 23, 2020. However, Pitolo was unable to make weight and the bout was scrapped from the card.

Sato was scheduled to face Ramiz Brahimaj on June 27, 2020 at UFC on ESPN: Poirier vs. Hooker but the fight was scratched due to one of Brahimaj's cornermen testing positive for COVID-19. Two days before the fight, Sato's opponent was switched to UFC newcomer Jason Witt. Sato won the fight via knock out in 48 seconds in round one.

Sato was scheduled to face Daniel Rodriguez on August 22, 2020, at UFC on ESPN 15. However, despite making the required weight, Sato was not cleared to fight by Nevada State Athletic Commission medical personnel and was removed from the card. Later, Sato revealed that a skin infection in his torso was the reason for the removal.

As the last fight of his contract, Sato faced Miguel Baeza on November 28, 2020, at UFC on ESPN: Smith vs. Clark. He lost the fight via second round arm-triangle choke.

Sato returned after more than a one-year hiatus and faced Gunnar Nelson, replacing injured Cláudio Silva, on 19 March 2022 at UFC Fight Night 204. He lost the fight via unanimous decision.

Sato faced Bryan Battle on August 6, 2022, at UFC on ESPN: Santos vs. Hill. He lost the fight via knockout in round one.

Sato faced Themba Gorimbo on May 20, 2023, at UFC Fight Night 223. He lost the fight via unanimous decision.

On June 8, it was announced that Sato was not extended a new contract and was no longer on the UFC roster.

== Mixed martial arts record ==
Professional record breakdown
25 matches	16 wins	9 losses
By knockout	11	3
By submission	2	3
By decision	3	3

Res.	Record	Opponent	Method	Event	Date	Round	Time	Location	Notes
Loss	16–9	Christopher Alvidrez	TKO (punches)	XFC Young Guns 7-8	April 30, 2025	1		Deerfield, Florida, United States	
Loss	16–8	Jang Yun-seong	Decision (unanimous)	Z-Fight Night 2	December 14, 2024	3	5:00	Goyang, South Korea	
Loss	16–7	Themba Gorimbo	Decision (unanimous)	UFC Fight Night: Dern vs. Hill	May 20, 2023	3	5:00	Las Vegas, Nevada, United States	
Loss	16–6	Bryan Battle	KO (head kick)	UFC on ESPN: Santos vs. Hill	August 6, 2022	1	0:44	Las Vegas, Nevada, United States	
Loss	16–5	Gunnar Nelson	Decision (unanimous)	UFC Fight Night: Volkov vs. Aspinall	March 19, 2022	3	5:00	London, England	
Loss	16–4	Miguel Baeza	Submission (arm-triangle choke)	UFC on ESPN: Smith vs. Clark	November 28, 2020	2	4:28	Las Vegas, Nevada, United States	
Win	16–3	Jason Witt	TKO (punches)	UFC on ESPN: Poirier vs. Hooker	June 27, 2020	1	0:48	Las Vegas, Nevada, United States	
Loss	15–3	Belal Muhammad	Submission (rear-naked choke)	UFC 242	September 7, 2019	3	1:55	Abu Dhabi, United Arab Emirates	
Win	15–2	Ben Saunders	TKO (punches and elbows)	UFC Fight Night: Jacaré vs. Hermansson	April 27, 2019	2	1:18	Sunrise, Florida, United States	
Win	14–2	Matt Vaile	TKO (punches)	Pancrase 300	October 21, 2018	2	3:35	Tokyo, Japan	
Loss	13–2	Glaico França	Submission (rear-naked choke)	Pancrase 297	July 1, 2018	4	1:15	Tokyo, Japan	For the vacant Pancrase Welterweight Championship.
Win	13–1	Masayuki Hamagishi	TKO (elbows and punches)	GRANDSLAM 7	March 25, 2018	2	3:59	Tokyo, Japan	
Win	12–1	Akihiro Murayama	TKO (punches)	Pancrase 292	December 10, 2017	1	0:52	Tokyo, Japan	
Win	11–1	Kenta Takagi	TKO (punches)	Pancrase 289	August 20, 2017	1	4:15	Tokyo, Japan	
Win	10–1	Anton Radman	TKO (knee)	Pancrase 286	April 23, 2017	1	3:43	Tokyo, Japan	
Win	9–1	Eric Michael Fought	Decision (split)	Pancrase 273	December 13, 2015	3	3:00	Tokyo, Japan	
Loss	8–1	Kenta Takagi	TKO (punch)	Pancrase 269	August 8, 2015	1	2:27	Tokyo, Japan	
Win	8–0	Yusaku Tsukumo	TKO (doctor stoppage)	DEEP 72 Impact	May 16, 2015	1	2:09	Tokyo, Japan	
Win	7–0	Vyron Phillips	Decision (unanimous)	Pancrase 265	March 15, 2015	3	5:00	Tokyo, Japan	
Win	6–0	Hidetora Matsuoka	TKO (punches)	DEEP DREAM Impact 2014: Omisoka Special	December 31, 2014	1	4:21	Saitama, Japan	
Win	5–0	Yasuaki Miura	TKO (punch)	TTF Challenge 03	November 2, 2014	1	0:29	Tokyo, Japan	
Win	4–0	Genpei Hayashi	TKO (punches)	Pancrase 260	August 10, 2014	1	2:51	Tokyo, Japan	
Win	3–0	Makoto Kawawa	Submission (rear-naked choke)	Pancrase 258	May 11, 2014	3	2:36	Tokyo, Japan	
Win	2–0	Joe Proctor	Submission (arm-triangle choke)	Pancrase Bayside Fight 2	December 31, 2013	1	2:31	Yokohama, Japan	
Win	1–0	Shotaro Yabe	Decision (unanimous)	DEEP: Tribe Tokyo Fight	October 20, 2013	2	5:00	Tokyo, Japan	Welterweight debut.

== See also ==
- List of male mixed martial artists
