= UFC Fight Night: Yusuff vs. Barboza =

2023 mixed martial event in Nevada, US

- The poster for UFC Fight Night: Yusuff vs. Barboza
- Promotion: Ultimate Fighting Championship
- Date: October 14, 2023
- Venue: UFC Apex
- City: Enterprise, Nevada, United States
- Attendance: Not announced

Event chronology
UFC Fight Night: Dawson vs. Green	UFC Fight Night: Yusuff vs. Barboza	UFC 294: Makhachev vs. Volkanovski 2

UFC Fight Night: Yusuff vs. Barboza (also known as UFC Fight Night 230, UFC on ESPN+ 88, and UFC Vegas 81) was a mixed martial arts event produced by the Ultimate Fighting Championship that took place on October 14, 2023, at the UFC Apex facility in Enterprise, Nevada, part of the Las Vegas Metropolitan Area, United States.

== Background ==
A featherweight bout between Sodiq Yusuff and Edson Barboza headlined the event. They were previously expected to meet at UFC Fight Night: Moraes vs. Sandhagen in October 2020, but Yusuff pulled out due to undisclosed reasons.

A bantamweight bout between Cameron Saaiman and Christian Rodriguez took place at the event. The pairing was previously scheduled to meet at UFC 290 in July, but Rodriguez pulled out due to injury. At the weigh-ins, Rodriguez weighed in at 140 pounds, four pounds over the bantamweight non-title fight limit. Their bout proceeded at catchweight and he was fined a percentage of his purse, which went to Saaiman.

A women's bantamweight bout between Tainara Lisboa and Darya Zheleznyakova was scheduled for the event. However, Zheleznyakova was removed due to undisclosed reasons and replaced by Ravena Oliveira.

A flyweight bout between Tatsuro Taira and David Dvořák was expected to take place at the event. However, the bout was cancelled for unknown reasons.

A middleweight bout between Michel Pereira and Marc-André Barriault was expected to take place at the event. However, Barriault withdrew due to medical issues and was replaced by Andre Petroski.

A lightweight bout between Terrance McKinney and Chris Duncan was expected to take place at the event. However, Duncan withdrew due to visa issues and was replaced by promotional newcomer Brendon Marotte.

A flyweight rematch between Edgar Chairez and Daniel Lacerda was scheduled for the event. Their first meeting was ruled a no contest after referee Chris Tognoni mistakenly thought Lacerda was put to sleep from Chairez's standing guillotine at UFC Fight Night: Grasso vs. Shevchenko 2. However, due to Lacerda's medical issues, the bout was cancelled.

== Results ==
Main card (ESPN+)
Weight class				Method	Round	Time	Notes
Featherweight	Edson Barboza	def.	Sodiq Yusuff	Decision (unanimous) (49–46, 48–46, 48–46)	5	5:00
Women's Flyweight	Viviane Araújo	def.	Jennifer Maia	Decision (unanimous) (29–28, 29–28, 29–28)	3	5:00
Bantamweight	Jonathan Martinez	def.	Adrian Yañez	TKO (leg kick)	2	2:26
Middleweight	Michel Pereira	def.	Andre Petroski	TKO (punches)	1	1:06
Catchweight (140 lb)	Christian Rodriguez	def.	Cameron Saaiman	Decision (unanimous) (30–27, 30–27, 29–28)	3	5:00
Preliminary card (ESPN+)
Featherweight	Darren Elkins	def.	T.J. Brown	Submission (rear-naked choke)	3	2:23
Women's Bantamweight	Tainara Lisboa	def.	Ravena Oliveira	Decision (unanimous) (29–28, 29–28, 29–28)	3	5:00
Lightweight	Terrance McKinney	def.	Brendan Marotte	TKO (knee and punches)	1	0:20
Women's Bantamweight	Melissa Mullins	def.	Irina Alekseeva	Decision (unanimous) (30–27, 29–28, 29–28)	3	5:00
Bantamweight	Chris Gutiérrez	def.	Alateng Heili	Decision (unanimous) (30–27, 30–27, 30–27)	3	5:00
Women's Strawweight	Emily Ducote	def.	Ashley Yoder	Decision (unanimous) (30–27, 29–28, 29–28)	3	5:00

== Bonus awards ==
The following fighters received $50,000 bonuses.

- Fight of the Night: Edson Barboza vs. Sodiq Yusuff
- Performance of the Night: Jonathan Martinez and Michel Pereira

== Aftermath ==
On July 19, 2024, UFC announced that Irina Alekseeva – who fought at this event – had tested positive for testosterone of exogenous origin already in April, but UFC's antidoping partner at the time, USADA, failed to inform both UFC and Alekseeva in timely fashion. If the information had arrived prior to the event, Alekseeva would not have had permission to compete. Subsequent samples provided by Alekseeva were negative, but she was banned from competition by CSAD (Combat Sports Anti-Doping) for 12 months nevertheless, making her eligible to return to competition on October 15, 2024.

== See also ==
- List of UFC events
- List of current UFC fighters
- 2023 in UFC
