= Cody Brundage =

American mixed martial arts fighter

- Born: Cody Sterling Brundage; May 16, 1994 (age 32); Chapin, South Carolina, U.S.
- Height: 6 ft 1 in (1.85 m)
- Weight: 185 lb (84 kg; 13 st 3 lb)
- Division: Light Heavyweight; Middleweight
- Reach: 72 in (183 cm)
- Stance: Orthodox
- Fighting out of: Englewood, Colorado, U.S.
- Team: Factory X
- Rank: Black belt in Brazilian Jiu-Jitsu
- Years active: 2019–present

Mixed martial arts record
- Total: 23
- Wins: 12
- By knockout: 7
- By submission: 3
- By decision: 1
- By disqualification: 1
- Losses: 9
- By knockout: 3
- By submission: 2
- By decision: 4
- Draws: 1
- No contests: 1

Other information
- Mixed martial arts record from Sherdog

Cody Sterling Brundage (born May 16, 1994) is an American mixed martial artist who competes in the Middleweight division of the Ultimate Fighting Championship.

== Background ==
Brundage was an accomplished high school wrestler at Chapin High School in Chapin, South Carolina. He held a 56–3 record as a senior, finishing as a SCHSL state-runner up and held a career record of 128–22. Brundage also played football and was on the swim team.

He continued wrestling at Newberry College. At Newberry, Brundage had 96 wins and was a two-time NCAA Division II national qualifier, and was a team captain.

Brundage's interest in MMA started in his wrestling days, running fight clubs out of the wrestling rooms. After completing college and wrestling on the Newberry College team, he started training in fighting.

== Mixed martial arts career ==
=== Early career ===
Brundage made his amateur debut in 2017, compiling a record of 4–2 before turning professional in 2019. Brundage went 5–0 on the local Midwest scene, capturing the Lights Out Championship Middleweight and Light Heavyweight Championships, defeating Erick Lozano for both at LOC 6 in December 2019, and at LOC 7 in February 2020. Brundage got a chance at a UFC contract at Dana White's Contender Series 31 against William Knight. However, he lost the bout via TKO in the first round.

Brundage faced Joseph Kropschot at LFA 99 on February 12, 2021. He won the bout via third round arm-triangle submission.

=== Ultimate Fighting Championship ===
Brundage made his UFC debut as a replacement for Karl Roberson against Nick Maximov on September 25, 2021, at UFC 266. Brundage lost his debut via unanimous decision.

Brundage faced Dalcha Lungiambula on March 12, 2022, at UFC Fight Night 203. He won the fight via guillotine choke in round one. This win earned him the Performance of the Night award.

Brundage, as a replacement for Josh Fremd, faced Tresean Gore on July 9, 2022, at UFC on ESPN 39. He won the fight via knockout in round one.

Brundage was scheduled to face Rodolfo Vieira on November 19, 2022, at UFC Fight Night 215. However, Vieira pull out from the event due to undisclosed reason and the bout was scrapped.

Brundage, as a replacement for Albert Duraev, faced Michał Oleksiejczuk on December 17, 2022, at UFC Fight Night 216. Brundage lost the fight via knockout in round one.

Brundage faced Rodolfo Vieira at UFC on ESPN 45 on April 29, 2023. He lost the fight via submission in round two.

Brundage, as a replacement for Punahele Soriano, faced Sedriques Dumas on June 24, 2023 at UFC on ABC 5. He lost the bout via unanimous decision.

Brundage faced Jacob Malkoun in a short-notice fight on September 23, 2023 at UFC Fight Night 228. Brundage won the fight via disqualification, after being rendered unable to continue due to an illegal elbow to the back of the head.

Brundage faced Zachary Reese on December 2, 2023, at UFC on ESPN 52. He won the fight by first round knockout due to a slam and punches. This fight earned him the Performance of the Night award.

Brundage faced Bo Nickal on April 13, 2024 at UFC 300. He lost the fight by rear-naked choke submission in the second round.

Brundage faced Abdul Razak Alhassan on July 13, 2024, at UFC on ESPN 59. The bout ended in a no-contest early in the first round as a result of elbows to the back of the head of Brundage rendering him unable to continue.

Brundage was scheduled to face The Ultimate Fighter: Team Grasso vs. Team Shevchenko middleweight tournament winner Ryan Loder on March 1, 2025 at UFC Fight Night 253. However, Loder withdrew from the fight for unknown reasons and was replaced by Julian Marquez. Brundage defeated Marquez by technical knockout at the end of the first round.

Brundage faced Mansur Abdul-Malik on June 14, 2025 at UFC on ESPN 69. Initially, the bout was ruled as a loss for Brundage via technical decision after an accidental headbutt rendered Brundage from continuing in the third round. On July 23, 2025, following Brundage’s appeal, the Georgia Athletic and Entertainment Commission (GAEC) reversed the original ruling and declared the bout a majority draw, citing their policy that incomplete rounds cannot be scored; the judges' scores for the two completed rounds were 19–19, 19–19, and 18–20.

Brundage faced Eric McConico in a light heavyweight bout on August 9, 2025 at UFC on ESPN 72. He lost the fight by split decision. 6 out of 9 media outlets scored the bout for Brundage.

Brundage faced Cameron Rowston on February 1, 2026, at UFC 325. He lost the fight by technical knockout in the second round.

Replacing Duško Todorović who withdrew for undisclosed reasons, Brundage faced undefeated prospect Donte Johnson on March 7, 2026, at UFC 326. He lost the fight by split decision.

Brundage faced Andre Petroski on May 16, 2026 at UFC Fight Night 276. He won the fight by technical knockout in the second round.

== Personal life ==
Brundage comes from an athletic family; his mother was on the U.S. Olympic team for biathlon, and his father was Special Forces. Brundage's youngest brother played lacrosse, and his sister plays soccer on the D-1 level.

He is married to former UFC fighter, Amanda Brundage, who retired to get her nursing license.

== Championships and accomplishments ==
=== Mixed martial arts ===
- Ultimate Fighting Championship
  - Performance of the Night (Two times) vs. Dalcha Lungiambula and Zachary Reese
  - UFC Honors Awards
    - 2025: Fan's Choice Comeback of the Year Nominee vs. Julian Marquez
- Lights Out Championship
  - LOC Light Heavyweight Championship (One time)
  - LOC Middleweight Championship (One time)

=== Amateur wrestling ===
- National Collegiate Athletic Association
  - NCAA Division II National Qualifier Wrestler out of Newberry College (2016, 2017)
- South Carolina High School League
  - South Carolina 3A 145 lb 4th place out of Chapin High School (2010)
  - South Carolina 3A 182 lb State Runner-Up out of Chapin High School (2012)

== Mixed martial arts record ==
Professional record breakdown
23 matches	12 wins	9 losses
By knockout	7	3
By submission	3	2
By decision	1	4
By disqualification	1	0
Draws	1	
No contests	1	

Res.	Record	Opponent	Method	Event	Date	Round	Time	Location	Notes
Win	12–9–1 (1)	Andre Petroski	TKO (punches)	UFC Fight Night: Allen vs. Costa	May 16, 2026	2	0:44	Las Vegas, Nevada, United States	
Loss	11–9–1 (1)	Donte Johnson	Decision (split)	UFC 326	March 7, 2026	3	5:00	Las Vegas, Nevada, United States	
Loss	11–8–1 (1)	Cameron Rowston	TKO (punches)	UFC 325	February 1, 2026	2	4:08	Sydney, Australia	
Loss	11–7–1 (1)	Eric McConico	Decision (split)	UFC on ESPN: Dolidze vs. Hernandez	August 9, 2025	3	5:00	Las Vegas, Nevada, United States	Light Heavyweight bout.
Draw	11–6–1 (1)	Mansur Abdul-Malik	Draw (overturned)	UFC on ESPN: Usman vs. Buckley	June 14, 2025	3	0:36	Atlanta, Georgia, United States	Accidental clash of heads rendered Brundage unable to continue. Originally scored a technical decision victory for Abdul-Malik, later overturned and deemed a majority draw.
Win	11–6 (1)	Julian Marquez	TKO (punches)	UFC Fight Night: Kape vs. Almabayev	March 1, 2025	1	4:45	Las Vegas, Nevada, United States	
NC	10–6 (1)	Abdul Razak Alhassan	NC (illegal elbows)	UFC on ESPN: Namajunas vs. Cortez	July 13, 2024	1	0:37	Denver, Colorado, United States	Accidental elbows to the back of the head rendered Brundage unable to continue.
Loss	10–6	Bo Nickal	Submission (rear-naked choke)	UFC 300	April 13, 2024	2	3:38	Las Vegas, Nevada, United States	
Win	10–5	Zachary Reese	KO (slam and punches)	UFC on ESPN: Dariush vs. Tsarukyan	December 2, 2023	1	1:49	Austin, Texas, United States	Performance of the Night.
Win	9–5	Jacob Malkoun	DQ (illegal elbow)	UFC Fight Night: Fiziev vs. Gamrot	September 23, 2023	1	4:15	Las Vegas, Nevada, United States	An illegal elbow to the back of the head rendered Brundage unable to continue.
Loss	8–5	Sedriques Dumas	Decision (unanimous)	UFC on ABC: Emmett vs. Topuria	June 24, 2023	3	5:00	Jacksonville, Florida, United States	
Loss	8–4	Rodolfo Vieira	Submission (arm-triangle choke)	UFC on ESPN: Song vs. Simón	April 29, 2023	2	1:28	Las Vegas, Nevada, United States	
Loss	8–3	Michał Oleksiejczuk	KO (punches)	UFC Fight Night: Cannonier vs. Strickland	December 17, 2022	1	3:16	Las Vegas, Nevada, United States	
Win	8–2	Tresean Gore	KO (punches)	UFC on ESPN: dos Anjos vs. Fiziev	July 9, 2022	1	3:50	Las Vegas, Nevada, United States	
Win	7–2	Dalcha Lungiambula	Submission (guillotine choke)	UFC Fight Night: Santos vs. Ankalaev	March 12, 2022	1	3:41	Las Vegas, Nevada, United States	Performance of the Night.
Loss	6–2	Nick Maximov	Decision (unanimous)	UFC 266	September 25, 2021	3	5:00	Las Vegas, Nevada, United States	
Win	6–1	Joseph Kropschot	Submission (arm-triangle choke)	LFA 99	February 12, 2021	3	0:39	Park City, Kansas, United States	Return to Middleweight.
Loss	5–1	William Knight	TKO (elbows and punches)	Dana White's Contender Series 31	September 1, 2020	1	2:23	Las Vegas, Nevada, United States	
Win	5–0	Erick Lozano	Submission (arm-triangle choke)	Lights Out Championship 7	February 8, 2020	1	4:26	Grand Rapids, Michigan, United States	Won the LOC Light Heavyweight Championship.
Win	4–0	Erick Lozano	Decision (unanimous)	Lights Out Championship 6	December 14, 2019	5	5:00	Grand Rapids, Michigan, United States	Middleweight debut. Won the LOC Middleweight Championship.
Win	3–0	Josh Krizan	TKO (punches)	Caged Thunder 9	September 28, 2019	2	4:16	Cuyahoga Falls, Ohio, United States	Catchweight (190 lb) bout.
Win	2–0	Mike Johnson	KO (punch)	Carlos Llinas International Productions: Motor City Cagefights 6	July 26, 2019	1	0:12	Detroit, Michigan, United States	Light Heavyweight debut.
Win	1–0	Jesse Walthers	TKO (punches)	Lights Out Championship 3	April 27, 2019	1	1:54	Grand Rapids, Michigan, United States	Catchweight (195 lb) bout.

== See also ==
- List of current UFC fighters
- List of male mixed martial artists
