= The Return of The Ultimate Fighter: Team Volkanovski vs. Team Ortega =

UFC mixed martial arts television series and event in 2021

- Genre: Reality, Sports
- Created by: Frank Fertitta III, Lorenzo Fertitta, Dana White
- Starring: Dana White; Alexander Volkanovski; Brian Ortega
- Country of origin: United States

Production
- Running time: 60 minutes

Original release
- Network: ESPN+
- Release: June 1, 2021

Related
- The Ultimate Fighter: Heavy Hitters; The Ultimate Fighter: Team Peña vs. Team Nunes

The Return of The Ultimate Fighter: Team Volkanovski vs. Team Ortega (also known as The Ultimate Fighter 29 and TUF 29) is an installment of the Ultimate Fighting Championship (UFC)-produced reality television series The Ultimate Fighter. The show has been off-air for a few years, following The Ultimate Fighter: Heavy Hitters in 2018 broadcast by Fox Sports 1. The UFC officially announced its return in October 2020, now broadcast by ESPN+.

There were no physical tryouts for this season due to the COVID-19 pandemic. Instead, a remote casting took place on November 13, 2020, featuring male bantamweights and middleweights. Current UFC Featherweight Champion Alexander Volkanovski and former title challenger Brian Ortega were announced as the head coaches in early April 2021. They were previously expected to meet in a title bout at UFC 260, but the pairing was delayed due to the champion testing positive for COVID-19.

The full cast was officially announced on April 18, with the show debuting on June 1.

== Cast ==
=== Coaches ===
Team Volkanovski:

- Alexander Volkanovski, Head Coach
- Joe Lopez, Assistant Coach
- Craig Jones, Jiu Jitsu Coach
- Frank Hickman, Wrestling Coach
- Colby Thicknesse, Striking Coach
- Andrew Wood, Strength and Conditioning Coach

Team Ortega:

- Brian Ortega, Head Coach
- Tiki Ghosn, Assistant Coach
- Paul Herrera, Assistant Coach
- Rener Gracie, Jiu Jitsu Coach
- Jason Park, Strength and Conditioning Coach

=== Fighters ===
- Team Volkanovski
  - Bantamweights: Mitch Raposo, Dustin Lampros, Ricky Turcios and Brady Hiestand.
  - Middleweights: Ryder Newman, Gilbert Urbina, Aaron Phillips and Bryan Battle.
- Team Ortega
  - Bantamweights: Daniel Argueta, Liudvik Sholinian, Joshua Rettinghouse and Vince Murdock.
  - Middleweights: Andre Petroski, Tresean Gore, Miles Hunsinger, Kemran Lachinov and Michael Gillmore.

== Episodes ==
Episode 1 New Beginnings (June 1, 2021)

- For the first time in "TUF" history, the show will take place inside the UFC Apex in Las Vegas. UFC president Dana White emphasized his excitement for this new chapter.
- Both coaches get a chance to evaluate the fighters before picking teams.
- Volkanovski wins the coin toss and chose to pick the first fighter. That means Ortega would have the first fight pick and the fighters were picked in the following order:

Coach	1st Pick	2nd Pick	3rd Pick	4th Pick	5th Pick	6th Pick	7th Pick	8th Pick
Volkanovski	Mitch Raposo (BW)	Ryder Newman (MW)	Dustin Lampros (BW)	Gilbert Urbina (MW)	Ricky Turcios (BW)	Aaron Phillips (MW)	Brady Hiestand (BW)	Bryan Battle (MW)
Ortega	Daniel Argueta (BW)	Andre Petroski (MW)	Liudvik Sholinian (BW)	Tresean Gore (MW)	Joshua Rettinghouse (BW)	Miles Hunsinger (MW)	Vince Murdock (BW)	Kemran Lachinov (MW)

- With control of fight selection for the first matchup, Ortega chose his No. 2 pick Andre Petroski to take on Team Volkanovski's No. 6 pick Aaron Phillips in a middleweight matchup.
- Andre Petroski defeated Aaron Phillips via submission (guillotine choke) in round 1.
- Team Ortega retained control of fight selection, and with a bantamweight bout up next, he selected his No. 3 pick Liudvik Sholinian to fight Team Volkanovski's No. 1 pick Mitch Raposo.

Episode 2 Stake Your Claim (June 8, 2021)

- Liudvik Sholinian defeated Mitch Raposo via unanimous decision, after going to a third round.
- Team Volkanovski controlled the next fight selection - a middleweight bout. He selected his No. 2 pick Ryder Newman to take on Team Ortega's 4th pick Tresean Gore, at Newman's recommendation.

Episode 3 Bring in the Rhino (June 15, 2021)

- Ahead of their fight on this episode, middleweights Tresean Gore and Ryder Newman talk face to face in the house about their upcoming fight. Miles Hunsinger who trains with Newman at XTreme Couture in Las Vegas, are on opposite teams on the show, which caused some concern from Newman. However, Gore reassured his upcoming opponent their conversations were not about revealing secrets to his game.
- After two rounds, the judges unanimously decided that Tresean Gore was the winner of the fight, earning a spot in the semifinals.
- Team Ortega remains undefeated on the season through the first three fights, with two middleweights and one bantamweight in the semifinals.
- Episode four will return to the bantamweights. Coach Volkanovski selected his team’s Dustin Lampros to face Team Ortega’s Vincent Murdock.

Episode 4 On My Time (June 22, 2021)

- In the aftermath of their Episode 3 fight, Tresean Gore and Ryder Newman have a newfound respect for one another, and a swollen-faced Newman reveals he’s rooting for Gore to win the entire tournament.
- Down 3-0 in the head-to-head battle with Team Ortega, coach Alexander Volkanovski tries to boost team morale by bringing to practice former “TUF” winner and current UFC welterweight contender Michael Chiesa.
- Five days before the fight, Tresean Gore invites the Team Ortega coaching staff over to the house for a feast of steaks and other tasty helpings. The team bonds over the meal and getting haircuts from a visiting barber.
- In the fourth fight, Vince Murdock defeated Dustin Lampros via knockout (strikes) at 2:40 of the first round.
- With Team Ortega now leading the competition 4-0, Coach Ortega selects Kemran Lachinov to fight Bryan Battle, both last picked, in the next middleweight matchup. During the official announcement of the fifth fight, things got heated when Volkanovski and Ortega exchanged words. Chiesa and Team Ortega assistant Paul Herrera also engaged in back-and-forth after Chiesa accused Herrera of trash-talking the fighters, rather than the other coaches.

Episode 5 Hard Headed (June 29, 2021)

- Things are getting heated in the house. Mitch Raposo confronted Andre Petroski about including himself in Ortega and Volkanovski’s interaction during weigh-ins, as he believed that was the time for the coaches to have their moment.
- Ortega challenged some of the fighters in a two versus one game of foosball, bringing out his competitive nature. Raposo watched from a distance, thinking Ortega was celebrating a little too much and being childish.
- Demonstrating a variety of quick strikes and a good takedown defense, Bryan Battle won with a 2-round unanimous decision over Kemran Lachinov, notching the first win of the season for Team Volkanovski.
- Returning to the bantamweight division, Coach Ortega selected his team’s Dan Argueta to face Team Volkanovski’s Rickey Turcios for the sixth fight.

Episode 6 Let the Games Begin (July 6, 2021)

- Ortega decided it was time to start a prank war. Team Ortega started off by removing the wheels and leaving their vehicles on car jack lifts. “Like we do in the neighborhood,” Ortega said. However, Ortega didn’t leave the opposing team without a mode of transportation. They brought in a couple of horses and dressed up a donkey with a Team Volkanovski jersey. “It was a good prank,” Volkaovski laughed. “We’re gonna be doing some solid pranks ourselves, so don’t you worry about that!”
- After an impromptu third round of the fight, the judges declared Ricky Turcios the winner of the bout over Dan Arqueta, picking up the second win in a row for Team Volkanovski. Turcios’s constant pressure and grappling success in the final round earned the victory against a tough opponent in Argueta who would not go away quietly.
- For the next bantamweight fight, Volkanovski picked his team’s Brady Heistand to face Team Ortega’s Josh Rettinghouse.
- “It does suck to fight Josh,” Heistand said. “I’ve known him for a while, I’ve even trained with him back in Spokane. Once the cage closes, he’s just a guy trying to take what I’ve worked for.”
- “Whether or not he’s my friend, or not, nice guy, whatever it is, I don’t care,” Rettinghouse said. “I know he’s going to have a great career ahead of him, but I can’t let him stand in my way.

Episode 7 Friend or Foe (July 13, 2021)

- Good friends Brady Hiestand and Josh Rettinghouse discussed their past training sessions in the hot tub as they prepared to fight each other later in the episode.
- Brady Heistand won with a split-decision over Josh Rettinghouse after the completion of three hard-fought rounds. The victory marked the third in a row for Team Volkanovski, who are now one step closer to evening up the team’s season records.
- Coach Volkanovski made the selection for the next bout, which returns to the middleweights for the final bout of the first round for the weight class. He selected his team’s Gilbert Urbina to face Team Ortega’s Miles Hunsinger.

Episode 8 Fight or Flight (July 20, 2021)

- Miles Hunsinger was going through a regular training session with his Team Ortega teammates and after throwing a left kick to Tresean Gore during a light sparring session, the strike landed awkwardly, causing hyperextension that left his knee unstable. After a review by a physical therapist Miles decided to get an MRI which provided a diagnosis of a grade 2 MCL strain, an injury that could be competed on, but with a very high risk of causing further significant damage. Hunsinger returned to speak with Ortega and the coaches to help make the best decision on how to proceed. After moving around a little bit to test his mobility, he ultimately decided that the right decision was to pull out of the fight.
- Micheal Gillmore was brought in to meet with Dana White about potentially replacing Hunsinger. The meeting was brief as White was impressed with his story, so he was welcomed into the fighter house as a replacement.
- Gilbert Urbina secured a submission victory over Michael Gillmore with just over two minutes remaining in the first round, evening the season series at four wins a piece for each team.
- Dana and the coaches met to set the semifinal fights. The two Bantamweight semifinal fights will be Ricky Turcios vs. Liudvik Sholinian (first semifinal fight) and Brady Hiestand vs. Vincent Murdock. The two Middleweight semifinal fights will be Bryan Battle vs. Andre Petroski and Gilbert Urbina vs. Tresean Gore.

Episode 9 Clocked (July 27, 2021)

- The semifinal fights are scheduled for three rounds, with a potential “sudden victory” fourth round. The opening round fights were two rounds with the potential for an extra third.
- Ortega and the other coaches on his team have a history of being late to practice and making their fighters wait. When this happened again, Team Volkanovski saw this as an opportunity for a prank, so they hung multiple clocks all over Team Ortega’s locker room. Volkanovski waited for Ortega’s arrival by sitting on the top shelf with a smiley face clock covering his shorts, giving the appearance that he was naked on the shelf.
- After three hard banging rounds, when the horn sounded, Turcios hopped on the top of the cage to celebrate and Dana White gave a standing ovation for the performance. After an exciting three rounds of fighting, the judges determined Ricky Turcios the winner of the fight over Liudvik Sholinian.
- Bryan Battle vs. Andre Petroski will take place as the first middleweight semifinal fight in the next episode.

Episode 10 Eye on the Prize (August 3, 2021)

- Both teams were brought outside to participate in a challenge hosted by Tavo Vildosola, Toyo Tires desert racing champion. The teams assembled their best pit crew and competed against each other to see who could change a tire the quickest on a desert racing truck. Team Volkanovski’s squad took care of the task with ease, and won the challenge by a wide margin, and were treated to a sushi feast as a reward.
- Both coaches visited their teams in the house. Volkanovski's coaches joined the sushi reward with the players.
- The middleweight fight was stopped in the first round after Petroski was cut over his right eye and complained it was a head butt. Video review showed that it was a knee from Battle and there was no head butt and the fight resumed. Petroski took Battle down midway through the round and kept control through the round to secure the points.
- Bryan Battle beat Andre Petroski with a guillotine choke in the second round and will move on to the middleweight finals.

Episode 11 Snake Bitten (August 10, 2021)

- Ortega owns a few exotic pets and has built a relationship with the owner of the shop. He decided to set up a prank using some of the largest snakes the owner could bring and had them placed on the floor of Team Volkanovski’s locker room. While some of the fighters were frightened, it seemed Volkanovski was intrigued by the animals as he wrapped them around his body and posed for pictures.
- UFC legend Donald Cerrone dropped in to share some knowledge with Team Volkanovski. "Cowboy" spoke to the group about enjoying the process of training and everything that comes along with being a professional fighter before rolling with the team on the mats.
- The coaches were set to face off in a game of cornhole at the UFC Apex. The game dragged on for the first few rounds and Ortega eventually found his groove and went on to take the game, winning $10,000 and $1,500 for each member of Team Ortega – but Ortega didn’t keep his money. He asked Dana White for an additional $2,000 and decided to divvy up his purse among Team Volkanovski as well.
- Brady Heistand won the second bantamweight semifinal over Vincent Murdock after taking Murdock down and in the first round and landing heavy blows until the ref stopped the fight via TKO.
- Team Volkanovski secures another victory, setting up the bantamweight finale between teammates Hiestand and Ricky Turcios.

Episode 12 A Beautiful Fight (August 17, 2021)

- Inviting the team to his house, the featherweight champ Volkanovski whipped up a hearty breakfast including eggs, bacon, and sausage to provide the team with nutrition and an escape from the normal living inside the fighter house.
- Coach Ortega brought his sons, brother, and his father to the house to meet the team. The guys hung out with the Ortega gang and they also put the grill to use. Carne Asada, ribs, and more were cooked for the team to enjoy while they also reflected on the season.
- Tresean Gore landed several powerful shots against Gilbert Urbina in the first and second rounds, eventually getting the KO win with a counter left hook.
- With Gore’s win, he is now set to face Bryan Battle to determine the winner of the middleweights. Ricky Turcios will take on Brady Hiestand to determine the bantamweight winner of the season. The finale will take place at UFC Fight Night on Aug. 28 at the UFC Apex in Las Vegas. The event is headlined by Edson Barboza vs. Giga Chikadze.

== Tournament bracket ==
=== Middleweight bracket ===
Quarter-finals
Andre Petroski	SUB
Aaron Phillips	1
Kemran Lachinov	2
Bryan Battle	UD
Tresean Gore	UD
Ryder Newman	2
Michael Gillmore*	1
Gilbert Urbina	SUB

Semi-finals
Andre Petroski	2
Bryan Battle	SUB
Tresean Gore	KO
Gilbert Urbina	2

Final
Bryan Battle	SUB
Gilbert Urbina**	2

* Miles Hunsinger injured his knee and was replaced by Gillmore.
** Gore injured his knee after the show and was replaced by Urbina.

=== Bantamweight bracket ===
Quarter-finals
Liudvik Sholinian	UD
Mitch Raposo	3
Daniel Argueta	3
Ricky Turcios	UD
Vince Murdock	TKO
Dustin Lampros	1
Joshua Rettinghouse	3
Brady Hiestand	SD

Semi-finals
Liudvik Sholinian	3
Ricky Turcios	UD
Vince Murdock	1
Brady Hiestand	TKO

Final
Ricky Turcios	SD
Brady Hiestand	3

Legend
	Team Volkanovski
	Team Ortega
UD	Unanimous Decision
MD	Majority Decision
SD	Split Decision
SUB	Submission
(T)KO	(Technical) Knock Out

== See also ==
- The Ultimate Fighter
- List of UFC events
- 2021 in UFC
- List of current UFC fighters
