= Vanessa Demopoulos =

American female mixed martial artist

- Born: Crystal Vanessa Demopoulos; September 22, 1988 (age 38); Cleveland, Ohio, U.S.
- Other names: Lil Monster
- Height: 5 ft 2 in (1.57 m)
- Weight: 125 lb (57 kg; 8.9 st)
- Division: Strawweight; Flyweight
- Reach: 59 in (150 cm)
- Fighting out of: Los Angeles, California, U.S.
- Team: Fight Ready; Ronin Training Center

Mixed martial arts record
- Total: 20
- Wins: 11
- By knockout: 1
- By submission: 4
- By decision: 6
- Losses: 9
- By knockout: 1
- By submission: 1
- By decision: 7

Other information
- Mixed martial arts record from Sherdog

Crystal Vanessa Demopoulos (Greek: Βανέσα Δημοπούλου; born September 22, 1988) is an American mixed martial artist who competes in the women's Strawweight division of the Ultimate Fighting Championship (UFC).

== Background ==
Born in Cleveland, Ohio, her parents and paternal grandparents raised her in Greece, as she is Greek herself and Greek is her first language. After she got involved with drugs and became homeless as a teenager, she got her life back together by following in her mother's footsteps at the age of 18, becoming an exotic dancer, continuing in the profession until right before her appearance at UFC 270.

Demopoulos started training in MMA around the age of 21, however her childhood was filled with fighting, even getting kicked out of schools for fighting.

== Mixed martial arts career ==
=== Early career ===
In her MMA debut at Iron Tiger Fight Series 79, she faced Emme Weber and went on to submit her in the first round via armbar. She made her Legacy Fighting Alliance debut at LFA 52, losing via unanimous decision to Itzel Sequivel. In her second appearance with LFA at LFA 62, She defeated Valerie Soto via majority decision. At LFA 69, she submitted Nadine Mandaiu in the first round via armbar, before defeating Loveth Young at LFA 81 via unanimous decision.

Demopoulos faced Sam Hughes for the inaugural LFA Women's Strawweight Championship on July 17, 2020 at LFA 85. She won the bout after choking Hughes unconscious in the 4th round via inverted triangle choke.

On August 11, 2020, Demopoulos appeared on Dana White's Contender Series 28 against Cory McKenna. She lost the bout via unanimous decision.

In the next bout at LFA 94, Demopoulos attempted to defend the LFA Women's Strawweight Championship against Lupita Godinez, losing the close bout and the belt via majority decision.

She rebounded from the loss, defeating Cynthia Arceo in 37 seconds via TKO stoppage at LFA 103 on March 26, 2021.

Demopoulos was booked to face Kathryn Paprocki on August 27, 2021 at LFA 114, however she was called to fight on short notice in the UFC.

=== Ultimate Fighting Championship ===
Demopoulos made her promotional debut on short notice replacing Tracy Cortez against JJ Aldrich on August 28, 2021 at UFC on ESPN 30. She lost the fight via unanimous decision.

Demopoulos was scheduled to face Ashley Yoder on January 15, 2022 at UFC on ESPN 32. However, Yoder withdrew from the event for undisclosed reasons and she was replaced by Silvana Gómez Juárez. The bout was pushed back to UFC 270 a few days before the event. She won the bout via armbar in the first round. This fight earned her a Performance of the Night award.

Demopoulos faced Jinh Yu Frey on June 25, 2022 at UFC on ESPN 38. She won the bout via split decision.

Demopoulos faced Maria Oliveira on November 19, 2022 at UFC Fight Night 215. She won the fight via unanimous decision.

Demopoulos faced Karolina Kowalkiewicz on May 20, 2023 at UFC Fight Night 223. At the weigh-ins, Demopoulos weighed in at 117.5 pounds, one and a half pounds over the women's strawweight limit in a non-title fight. The bout proceeded at catchweight and Demopoulos was fined 20 percent of her purse, which went to Kowalkiewicz. Demopoulos lost the fight via unanimous decision.

Demopoulos faced Kanako Murata on October 7, 2023, at UFC Fight Night 229. She won the fight via unanimous decision.

Demopoulos faced Emily Ducote on May 18, 2024, at UFC Fight Night 241. She won the fight by split decision.

Demopoulos faced Jaqueline Amorim on September 7, 2024 at UFC Fight Night 242. Despite complaining that Amorim's hands were in her gloves, Demopoulos lost the fight via an armbar submission in the first round.

Demopoulos faced Talita Alencar on April 5, 2025 at UFC on ESPN 65. She lost the fight by unanimous decision.

Replacing Tereza Bledá, who had to withdraw due to a staph infection, Demopoulos faced former LFA Women's Flyweight Champion Jamey-Lyn Horth on June 14, 2025 at UFC on ESPN 69. She lost the fight by unanimous decision.

Demopoulos faced Yazmin Jauregui on September 26, 2026, at UFC Fight Night 289. She lost the fight by knockout early into the first round round.

== Championships and accomplishments ==
- Ultimate Fighting Championship
  - Performance of the Night (One time) vs. Silvana Gómez Juárez
- Legacy Fighting Alliance
  - LFA Women's Strawweight Champion (One time, former)

== Mixed martial arts record ==
Professional record breakdown
20 matches	11 wins	9 losses
By knockout	1	1
By submission	4	1
By decision	6	7

Res.	Record	Opponent	Method	Event	Date	Round	Time	Location	Notes
Loss	11–9	Yazmin Jauregui	KO (punches)	UFC Fight Night: Rosas Jr. vs. Barcelos	September 26, 2026	1	1:02	Las Vegas, Nevada, United States	
Loss	11–8	Jamey-Lyn Horth	Decision (unanimous)	UFC on ESPN: Usman vs. Buckley	June 14, 2025	3	5:00	Atlanta, Georgia, United States	Flyweight bout.
Loss	11–7	Talita Alencar	Decision (unanimous)	UFC on ESPN: Emmett vs. Murphy	April 5, 2025	3	5:00	Las Vegas, Nevada, United States	
Loss	11–6	Jaqueline Amorim	Submission (armbar)	UFC Fight Night: Burns vs. Brady	September 7, 2024	1	3:28	Las Vegas, Nevada, United States	
Win	11–5	Emily Ducote	Decision (split)	UFC Fight Night: Barboza vs. Murphy	May 18, 2024	3	5:00	Las Vegas, Nevada, United States	
Win	10–5	Kanako Murata	Decision (unanimous)	UFC Fight Night: Dawson vs. Green	October 7, 2023	3	5:00	Las Vegas, Nevada, United States	
Loss	9–5	Karolina Kowalkiewicz	Decision (unanimous)	UFC Fight Night: Dern vs. Hill	May 20, 2023	3	5:00	Las Vegas, Nevada, United States	Catchweight (117.5 lb) bout; Demopoulos missed weight.
Win	9–4	Maria Oliveira	Decision (unanimous)	UFC Fight Night: Nzechukwu vs. Cuțelaba	November 19, 2022	3	5:00	Las Vegas, Nevada, United States	
Win	8–4	Jinh Yu Frey	Decision (split)	UFC on ESPN: Tsarukyan vs. Gamrot	June 25, 2022	3	5:00	Las Vegas, Nevada, United States	
Win	7–4	Silvana Gómez Juárez	Submission (armbar)	UFC 270	January 22, 2022	1	2:25	Anaheim, California, United States	Return to Strawweight. Performance of the Night.
Loss	6–4	JJ Aldrich	Decision (unanimous)	UFC on ESPN: Barboza vs. Chikadze	August 28, 2021	3	5:00	Las Vegas, Nevada, United States	Flyweight debut.
Win	6–3	Cynthia Arceo	TKO (punches)	LFA 103	March 26, 2021	1	0:37	Shawnee, Oklahoma, United States	Catchweight (118.8 lb) bout; Arceo missed weight.
Loss	5–3	Lupita Godinez	Decision (majority)	LFA 94	October 30, 2020	5	5:00	Park City, Kansas, United States	Lost the LFA Women's Strawweight Championship.
Loss	5–2	Cory McKenna	Decision (unanimous)	Dana White's Contender Series 28	August 11, 2020	3	5:00	Las Vegas, Nevada, United States	
Win	5–1	Sam Hughes	Technical Submission (inverted triangle choke)	LFA 85	July 17, 2020	4	2:21	Sioux Falls, South Dakota, United States	Won the inaugural LFA Women's Strawweight Championship.
Win	4–1	Loveth Young	Decision (unanimous)	LFA 81	January 31, 2020	3	5:00	Costa Mesa, California, United States	
Win	3–1	Nadine Mandiau	Submission (armbar)	LFA 69	June 7, 2019	1	2:37	Cabazon, California, United States	
Win	2–1	Valerie Ann Marie Soto	Decision (majority)	LFA 62	March 22, 2019	3	5:00	Dallas, Texas, United States	Catchweight (120 lb) bout.
Loss	1–1	Itzel Esquivel	Decision (unanimous)	LFA 52	October 19, 2018	3	5:00	Belton, Texas, United States	
Win	1–0	Emme Weber	Submission (armbar)	IT Fight Series 79	December 15, 2017	1	4:36	Columbus, Ohio, United States	Strawweight debut.

== See also ==
- List of current UFC fighters
- List of female mixed martial artists
