= 2020 in Legacy Fighting Alliance =

Information
- Promotion: Legacy Fighting Alliance
- First date aired: January 17, 2020
- Last date aired: December 4, 2020

2020 was the fourth year in the history of Legacy Fighting Alliance, a mixed martial arts promotion based in the United States.

== Event list ==
=== Legacy Fighting Alliance 80: Garcia vs. Marsical ===
Legacy Fighting Alliance 80: Garcia vs. Marsical
- Promotion: Legacy Fighting Alliance
- Date: January 17, 2020
- Venue: Route 66 Casino Hotel
- City: Albuquerque, New Mexico, U.S.

Event chronology
Legacy Fighting Alliance 79: Royval vs. Williams	Legacy Fighting Alliance 80: Garcia vs. Marsical	Legacy Fighting Alliance 81: Emmers vs. Barbosa

Legacy Fighting Alliance 80: Garcia vs. Marsical was the eighty-first event of Legacy Fighting Alliance and took place on January 17, 2020. It aired on UFC Fight Pass.

Results

Main Card
Weight class				Method	Round	Time	Notes
Featherweight	Steve Garcia	def.	Jose Mariscal	TKO (punches)	2	2:27
Flyweight	Jerome Rivera	def.	Kendrick Latchman	Submission (triangle choke)	2	4:12
Lightweight	Carrington Banks	def.	Chris Brown	Decision (unanimous)	3	5:00
Featherweight	Toninho Gavinho	def.	Josh Marsh	Decision (split)	3	5:00
Middleweight	Jordan Wright	def.	Gabriel Checco	TKO (knees and punches)	2	0:48
Welterweight	Tyler Ray	def.	Josh Streacker	Submission (rear-naked choke)	2	3:01
Featherweight	Sean William Cerveny	def.	Edwin Cooper Jr.	Submission (armbar)	1	4:25
Preliminary Card
Flyweight	Josiah Reyes	def.	Ricky Esquibel	Submission (rear-naked choke)	1	4:25
Bantamweight	Caleb Ramirez	def.	Chris Rojas	Decision (unanimous)	3	5:00
Catchweight (175 lbs)	Jalin Fuller	def.	Gabe Rodriguez	TKO (punches)	1	0:13
Amateur Bouts
Heavyweight	Mario Moore	def.	Dwight Maters	KO (punch)	1	0:37
Lightweight	Ty Miller	def.	Caleb Gunter	TKO (punches)	2	2:52

=== Legacy Fighting Alliance 81: Emmers vs. Barbosa ===
Legacy Fighting Alliance 81: Emmers vs. Barbosa
- Promotion: Legacy Fighting Alliance
- Date: January 31, 2020
- Venue: Costa Mesa Hall at the OC Fair & Event Center
- City: Costa Mesa, California, U.S.

Event chronology
Legacy Fighting Alliance 80: Garcia vs. Marsical	Legacy Fighting Alliance 81: Emmers vs. Barbosa	Legacy Fighting Alliance 82: Polizzi vs. Pogues

Legacy Fighting Alliance 81: Emmers vs. Barbosa was the eighty-second event of Legacy Fighting Alliance and took place on January 31, 2020. It aired on UFC Fight Pass.

Results

Main Card
Weight class				Method	Round	Time	Notes
Featherweight	Jamall Emmers	def.	Rafael Barbosa	Submission (arm-triangle choke)	3	2:39
Catchweight (160 lbs)	Jacob Rosales	def.	Salaiman Ahmadyar	Decision (unanimous)	3	5:00
Welterweight	Christian Aguilera	def.	Gláucio Eliziário	Decision (unanimous)	3	5:00
Women's Flyweight	Sam Hughes	def.	Lisa Mauldin	Decision (unanimous)	3	5:00
Bantamweight	Vincent Cachero	def.	Marvin Garcia	TKO (punches)	2	1:22
Bantamweight	Leandro Gomes	def.	Yuma Horiuchi	Decision (split)	3	5:00
Women's Strawweight	Vanessa Demopoulos	def.	Loveth Young	Decision (unanimous)	3	5:00
Preliminary Card (Amateur Bouts)
Welterweight	Alexander Cruz	def.	Robert Pearlman	Decision (unanimous)	3	3:00
Featherweight	Jota Ninomiya	def.	Quincy Holland	Decision (split)	3	3:00
Lightweight	Bryant Shell	def.	Joshua Dell	Decision (unanimous)	3	3:00
Welterweight	Jeffrey Craig	def.	David Rivera	Decision (unanimous)	3	3:00
Postliminary Card
Lightweight	Carlos Figueroa	def.	Lance Lee	KO (punch)	1	3:15
Featherweight	Geoffrey Mellor	def.	Nick Badis	Submission (rear-naked choke)	1	2:45

=== Legacy Fighting Alliance 82: Polizzi vs. Pogues ===
Legacy Fighting Alliance 82: Polizzi vs. Pogues
- Promotion: Legacy Fighting Alliance
- Date: February 21, 2020
- Venue: Mystic Lake Casino Hotel
- City: Prior Lake, Minnesota, U.S.

Event chronology
Legacy Fighting Alliance 81: Emmers vs. Barbosa	Legacy Fighting Alliance 82: Polizzi vs. Pogues	Legacy Fighting Alliance 83: Jackson vs. Chaulet

Legacy Fighting Alliance 82: Polizzi vs. Pogues was the eighty-third event of Legacy Fighting Alliance and took place on February 21, 2020. It aired on UFC Fight Pass.

Results

Main Card
Weight class				Method	Round	Time	Notes
Light Heavyweight	Alex Polizzi	def.	Jamal Pogues	Submission (heel hook)	4	0:41	(Note: For the vacant LFA Light Heavyweight Championship.)
Featherweight	Jake Childers	def.	Nate Richardson	TKO (slam)	1	2:50
Women's Strawweight	Pauline Macias	def.	Dana Zighelboim Grau	Decision (split)	3	5:00
Welterweight	Korey Kuppe	def.	J.P. Saint Louis	TKO (elbows)	2	3:08
Flyweight	Nate Smith	def.	Sean Stebbins	TKO (punches)	2	0:45
Heavyweight	Thomas Petersen	def.	Brian Peterson	TKO (punches)	1	1:52
Preliminary Card
Featherweight	Angel Pacheco	def.	Felipe Martinez Donis	TKO (punches)	2	1:40
Featherweight	Christian Rodriguez	def.	Jason Huntley	TKO (knee and punches)	1	4:50
Amateur Bouts
Lightweight	Jordan Clark	def.	Nick Kaaze	Decision (unanimous)	3	3:00
Catchweight (200 lbs)	Wesley Schultz	def.	Jackson McVey	Decision (unanimous)	3	3:00
Catchweight (175 lbs)	Joshua Fleck	def.	Manatua Lemaire	Decision (unanimous)	3	3:00
Middleweight	C.J. Hays	def.	Prinston Cameron	KO (punch)	1	0:13
Featherweight	Santos Verdinez	def.	Stephen Lesko	Decision (unanimous)	3	3:00
Bantamweight	Trevor Schultz	def.	Andre Sellars	Submission (triangle choke)	2	1:58
Bantamweight	Abubakar Adamu	def.	Eimar Hernandez	Decision (unanimous)	3	3:00

=== Legacy Fighting Alliance 83: Jackson vs. Chaulet ===
Legacy Fighting Alliance 83: Jackson vs. Chaulet
- Promotion: Legacy Fighting Alliance
- Date: March 6, 2020
- Venue: The Bomb Factory
- City: Dallas, Texas, U.S.

Event chronology
Legacy Fighting Alliance 82: Polizzi vs. Pogues	Legacy Fighting Alliance 83: Jackson vs. Chaulet	Legacy Fighting Alliance 84: Gonzales vs. Childers

Legacy Fighting Alliance 83: Jackson vs. Chaulet was the eighty-fourth event of Legacy Fighting Alliance and took place on March 6, 2020. It aired on UFC Fight Pass.

Results

Main Card
Weight class				Method	Round	Time	Notes
Featherweight	Damon Jackson	def.	Mauro Chaulet	Submission (rear-naked choke)	1	2:11
Welterweight	Matt Dixon	def.	Justin Patterson	Decision (unanimous)	3	5:00
Women's Bantamweight	Hailey Cowan	def.	Brittney Cloudy	Decision (split)	3	5:00
Heavyweight	Vernon Lewis	def.	Austen Lane	TKO (punches)	1	4:10
Flyweight	Victor Altamirano	def.	Chris Ocon	Decision (split)	3	5:00
Bantamweight	Fernie Garcia	def.	Jay Viola	Decision (unanimous)	3	5:00
Preliminary Card
Lightweight	Malik Lewis	def.	David Luna	TKO (punches)	2	2:29
Lightweight	Elijah Johns	def.	Zac Kelley	TKO (punches)	1	2:05
Amateur Bouts
Women's Strawweight	Macy Breaux	def.	Destiny Oldenkamp	Decision (unanimous)	3	3:00

=== Legacy Fighting Alliance 84: Gonzales vs. Childers ===
Legacy Fighting Alliance 84: Gonzales vs. Childers
- Promotion: Legacy Fighting Alliance
- Date: July 10, 2020
- Venue: Sanford Pentagon
- City: Sioux Falls, South Dakota, U.S.

Event chronology
Legacy Fighting Alliance 83: Jackson vs. Chaulet	Legacy Fighting Alliance 84: Gonzales vs. Childers	Legacy Fighting Alliance 85: Hughes vs. Demopoulos

Legacy Fighting Alliance 84: Gonzales vs. Childers was the eighty-fifth event of Legacy Fighting Alliance and took place on July 10, 2020. It aired on UFC Fight Pass.

Results

Main Card
Weight class				Method	Round	Time	Notes
Featherweight	Justin Gonzalez	def.	Jake Childers	TKO (kick and punches)	4	0:45	(Note: For the vacant LFA Featherweight Championship.)
Welterweight	Maycon Mendonça	def.	Kassius Kayne	Submission (triangle choke)	2	2:16
Catchweight (150 lbs)	Boston Salmon	def.	Shawn West	Disqualification (illegal knee)	2	0:53
Featherweight	Bruno Souza	def.	Kamuela Kirk	Decision (split)	3	5:00

=== Legacy Fighting Alliance 85: Hughes vs. Demopoulos ===
Legacy Fighting Alliance 85: Hughes vs. Demopoulos
- Promotion: Legacy Fighting Alliance
- Date: July 17, 2020
- Venue: Sanford Pentagon
- City: Sioux Falls, South Dakota, U.S.

Event chronology
Legacy Fighting Alliance 84: Gonzales vs. Childers	Legacy Fighting Alliance 85: Hughes vs. Demopoulos	Legacy Fighting Alliance 86: Fischer vs. Flick

Legacy Fighting Alliance 85: Hughes vs. Demopoulos was the eighty-sixth event of Legacy Fighting Alliance and took place on July 17, 2020. It aired on UFC Fight Pass.

Results

Main Card
Weight class				Method	Round	Time	Notes
Women's Strawweight	Vanessa Demopoulos	def.	Sam Hughes	Submission (triangle choke)	4	2:21	(Note: For the inaugural LFA Women's Strawweight Championship.)
Bantamweight	Kevin Natividad	def.	Kyle Estrada	KO (punches)	2	1:37
Featherweight	Leandro Gomes	def.	Jacob Thrall	Decision (unanimous)	3	5:00
Lightweight	Jordan Leavitt	def.	Leivon Lewis	Submission (anaconda choke)	2	2:01
Bantamweight	Christian Natividad	def.	Michael Aquila	KO (punches)	1	2:48
Heavyweight	Mitchell Sipe	def.	Darion Abbey	TKO (punches)	1	1:37

=== Legacy Fighting Alliance 86: Fischer vs. Flick ===
Legacy Fighting Alliance 86: Fischer vs. Flick
- Promotion: Legacy Fighting Alliance
- Date: July 24, 2020
- Venue: Sanford Pentagon
- City: Sioux Falls, South Dakota, U.S.

Event chronology
Legacy Fighting Alliance 85: Hughes vs. Demopoulos	Legacy Fighting Alliance 86: Fischer vs. Flick	Legacy Fighting Alliance 87: Logan vs. Rosales

Legacy Fighting Alliance 86: Fischer vs. Flick was the eighty-seventh event of Legacy Fighting Alliance and took place on July 24, 2020. It aired on UFC Fight Pass.

Results

Main Card
Weight class				Method	Round	Time	Notes
Flyweight	Jimmy Flick	def.	Greg Fischer	Submission (arm triangle)	1	0:38	(Note: For the vacant LFA Flyweight Championship.)
Lightweight	Arthur Estrázulas	def.	Dominic Clark	Submission (rear-naked choke)	1	3:26
Light Heavyweight	Fabio Cherant	def.	Erick Murray Jr.	Submission (anaconda choke)	1	0:57
Bantamweight	Mando Gutierrez	def.	Jeff Jespen	Submission (rear-naked choke)	1	1:57
Welterweight	Mark Martin	def.	Tony Grant	TKO (punches)	1	3:52
Heavyweight	Jordan Heiderman	def.	Jacob Heavlin	Decision (split)	3	5:00
Preliminary Card
Bantamweight	Calvin Harbaugh	def.	Nate Morrow	Submission (heel hook)	1	2:33

=== Legacy Fighting Alliance 87: Logan vs. Rosales ===
Legacy Fighting Alliance 87: Logan vs. Rosales
- Promotion: Legacy Fighting Alliance
- Date: July 31, 2020
- Venue: Sanford Pentagon
- City: Sioux Falls, South Dakota, U.S.

Event chronology
Legacy Fighting Alliance 86: Fischer vs. Flick	Legacy Fighting Alliance 87: Logan vs. Rosales	Legacy Fighting Alliance 88: Willis vs. de Jesus

Legacy Fighting Alliance 87: Logan vs. Rosales was the eighty-eighth event of Legacy Fighting Alliance and took place on July 31, 2020. It aired on UFC Fight Pass.

Results

Main Card
Weight class				Method	Round	Time	Notes
Lightweight	Bryce Logan	def.	Jacob Rosales	Decision (unanimous)	5	5:00	(Note: For the vacant LFA Lightweight Championship.)
Lightweight	Nick Browne	def.	Ben Egli	Decision (unanimous)	3	5:00
Middleweight	Joaquin Buckley	def.	Jackie Gosh	TKO (punches)	2	1:47
Featherweight	Kai Kamaka III	def.	Michael Stack	Decision (unanimous)	3	5:00
Lightweight	Gerald Scott	def.	Keith Phathaem	TKO (punches)	2	4:33
Light Heavyweight	Zac Pauga	def.	Zac Cavender	Decision (unanimous)	3	5:00
Preliminary Card
Welterweight	Ryan Charlebois	def.	Andrew Lipp	KO (punch)	1	3:37

=== Legacy Fighting Alliance 88: Willis vs. de Jesus ===
Legacy Fighting Alliance 88: Willis vs. de Jesus
- Promotion: Legacy Fighting Alliance
- Date: August 21, 2020
- Venue: Sanford Pentagon
- City: Sioux Falls, South Dakota, U.S.

Event chronology
Legacy Fighting Alliance 87: Logan vs. Rosales	Legacy Fighting Alliance 88: Willis vs. de Jesus	Legacy Fighting Alliance 89: Moore vs. Giannetti

Legacy Fighting Alliance 88: Willis vs. de Jesus was the eighty-ninth event of Legacy Fighting Alliance and took place on August 21, 2020. It aired on UFC Fight Pass.

Results

Main Card
Weight class				Method	Round	Time	Notes
Welterweight	Jaleel Willis	def.	Vinicius de Jesus	Decision (unanimous)	5	5:00	(Note: For the vacant LFA Welterweight Championship.)
Lightweight	Aaron McKenzie	def.	Gláucio Eliziário	Submission (rear-naked choke)	1	4:15
Featherweight	Natan Levy	def.	Ben Lugo	Decision (majority)	3	5:00
Lightweight	Evan Elder	def.	Kegan Gennrich	Decision (unanimous)	3	5:00
Preliminary Card
Flyweight	Charles Alex	def.	Robiel Tesfaldet	Submission (rear-naked choke)	2	4:01
Amateur Bouts
Middleweight	Jeff Nielsen	def.	Brady Minner	Decision (split)	3	3:00

=== Legacy Fighting Alliance 89: Moore vs. Giannetti ===
Legacy Fighting Alliance 89: Moore vs. Giannetti
- Promotion: Legacy Fighting Alliance
- Date: August 28, 2020
- Venue: Sanford Pentagon
- City: Sioux Falls, South Dakota, U.S.

Event chronology
Legacy Fighting Alliance 88: Willis vs. de Jesus	Legacy Fighting Alliance 89: Moore vs. Giannetti	Legacy Fighting Alliance 90: Lazishvili vs. Steele

Legacy Fighting Alliance 89: Moore vs. Giannetti was the ninetieth event of Legacy Fighting Alliance and took place on August 28, 2020. It aired on UFC Fight Pass.

Results

Main Card
Weight class				Method	Round	Time	Notes
Lightweight	Brant Moore	def.	Joe Giannetti	Decision (unanimous)	3	5:00
Welterweight	Demarques Jackson	def.	Adrian Hadribeaj	Submission (rear-naked choke)	1	3:19
Bantamweight	Ricardo Dias	def.	Desmond Torres	Decision (split)	3	5:00
Welterweight	Steve Jones	def.	Tyler Ray	Decision (split)	3	5:00
Light Heavyweight	Joshua Fremd	def.	Lamar Gosey	TKO (knees and punches)	1	1:26
Flyweight	Clayton Carpenter	def.	Manuel Medina	Decision (unanimous)	3	5:00

=== Legacy Fighting Alliance 90: Lazishvili vs. Steele ===
Legacy Fighting Alliance 90: Lazishvili vs. Steele
- Promotion: Legacy Fighting Alliance
- Date: September 4, 2020
- Venue: Sanford Pentagon
- City: Sioux Falls, South Dakota, U.S.

Event chronology
Legacy Fighting Alliance 89: Moore vs. Giannetti	Legacy Fighting Alliance 90: Lazishvili vs. Steele	Legacy Fighting Alliance 91: Njokuani vs. Torres

Legacy Fighting Alliance 90: Lazishvili vs. Steele was the ninety-first event of Legacy Fighting Alliance and took place on September 4, 2020. It aired on UFC Fight Pass.

Results

Main Card
Weight class				Method	Round	Time	Notes
Bantamweight	Zviad Lazishvili	def.	Ricky Steele	Submission (rear-naked choke)	1	3:42	(Note: For the vacant LFA Bantamweight Championship.)
Welterweight	Maycon Mendonça	def.	Devin Smyth	TKO (punches)	2	4:21
Welterweight	Ignacio Bahamondes	def.	Chris Brown	Decision (split)	3	5:00
Bantamweight	Mo Miller	def.	Mando Gutierrez	Submission (rear-naked choke)	2	4:26
Bantamweight	Allan Begosso	def.	Sean McPadden	TKO (punches)	1	0:48
Women's Strawweight	Tabatha Ricci	def.	Kelsey Arneson	Decision (unanimous)	3	5:00
Preliminary Card
Featherweight	Daniel Argueta	def.	Jackson Filho	Decision (unanimous)	3	5:00
Bantamweight	Alden Coria	def.	Calvin Harbaugh	Submission (rear-naked choke)	1	2:20

=== Legacy Fighting Alliance 91: Njokuani vs. Torres ===
Legacy Fighting Alliance 91: Njokuani vs. Torres
- Promotion: Legacy Fighting Alliance
- Date: September 11, 2020
- Venue: Sanford Pentagon
- City: Sioux Falls, South Dakota, U.S.

Event chronology
Legacy Fighting Alliance 90: Lazishvili vs. Steele	Legacy Fighting Alliance 91: Njokuani vs. Torres	Legacy Fighting Alliance 92: Wirth vs. Askar

Legacy Fighting Alliance 91: Njokuani vs. Torres was the ninety-second event of Legacy Fighting Alliance and took place on September 11, 2020. It aired on UFC Fight Pass.

Results

Main Card
Weight class				Method	Round	Time	Notes
Middleweight	Chidi Njokuani	def.	Cristhian Torres	TKO (knee and punches)	2	4:10
Middleweight	Kyle Stewart	def.	Tim Caron	TKO (punches)	2	4:00
Light Heavyweight	Jamal Pogues	def.	Tim Hiley	Decision (unanimous)	3	5:00
Women's Bantamweight	Kelly Clayton	def.	Hailey Cowan	Submission (guillotine choke)	2	0:46
Light Heavyweight	Nick Maximov	def.	Johnny James	Submission (rear-naked choke)	2	4:01
Featherweight	Nate Richardson	def.	Darius Estell	Decision (unanimous)	3	5:00
Welterweight	Josh Quinlan	def.	Pete Keepers	TKO (punches)	2	1:29
Preliminary Card
Featherweight	Edwin Chavez	def.	Keilen Fantroy	Submission (rear-naked choke)	1	4:00

=== Legacy Fighting Alliance 92: Wirth vs. Askar ===
Legacy Fighting Alliance 92: Wirth vs. Askar
- Promotion: Legacy Fighting Alliance
- Date: October 2, 2020
- Venue: Hartman Arena
- City: Park City, Kansas, U.S.

Event chronology
Legacy Fighting Alliance 91: Njokuani vs. Torres	Legacy Fighting Alliance 92: Wirth vs. Askar	Legacy Fighting Alliance 93: Petroski vs. Jeffery

Legacy Fighting Alliance 92: Wirth vs. Askar was the ninety-third event of Legacy Fighting Alliance and took place on October 2, 2020. It aired on UFC Fight Pass.

Results

Main Card
Weight class				Method	Round	Time	Notes
Bantamweight	Askar Askar	def.	Kevin Wirth	Decision (unanimous)	3	5:00
Welterweight	Antônio dos Santos Jr.	def.	André Fialho	Decision (unanimous)	3	5:00
Lightweight	Dakota Bush	def.	Brian Del Rosario	Submission (rear-naked choke)	1	2:38
Bantamweight	Ricky Furar	def.	Jacob Thrall	TKO (injury)	3	1:08
Flyweight	Rodney Kealohi	def.	Mefi Monterroso	KO (flying knee and punches)	1	0:30
Lightweight	Viecheslav Borshchev	def.	Ali Zebian	Decision (unanimous)	3	5:00
Bantamweight	Christian Natividad	def.	Jose Holguin	KO (punches)	1	0:29

=== Legacy Fighting Alliance 93: Petroski vs. Jeffery ===
Legacy Fighting Alliance 93: Petroski vs. Jeffery
- Promotion: Legacy Fighting Alliance
- Date: October 16, 2020
- Venue: Hartman Arena
- City: Park City, Kansas, U.S.

Event chronology
Legacy Fighting Alliance 92: Wirth vs. Askar	Legacy Fighting Alliance 93: Petroski vs. Jeffery	Legacy Fighting Alliance 94: Demopoulos vs. Godinez

Legacy Fighting Alliance 93: Jeffery vs. Petroski was the ninety-fourth event of Legacy Fighting Alliance and took place on October 16, 2020. It aired on UFC Fight Pass.

Results

Main Card
Weight class				Method	Round	Time	Notes
Middleweight	Aaron Jeffery	def.	Andre Petroski	TKO (elbow and knee)	2	4:19
Women's Catchweight (120 lbs)	Sam Hughes	def.	Danielle Hindley	Submission (guillotine choke)	1	5:00
Middleweight	Josh Fremd	def.	Antonio Jones	KO (punches)	1	3:18
Featherweight	Elijah Johns	def.	Luke Faultersack	Decision (unanimous)	3	5:00
Catchweight (140 lbs)	Justin Wetzell	def.	Teshay Gouthro	Decision (unanimous)	3	5:00
Flyweight	Carlos Hernandez	def.	Trevor Wells	Decision (unanimous)	3	5:00
Light Heavyweight	Josh DaSilveira	def.	Fernando Alvarado	Submission (arm triangle)	3	3:35
Preliminary Card
Bantamweight	Christian Rodriguez	def.	John Pham	Submission (rear-naked choke)	2	1:44
Amateur Bouts
Featherweight	Jared Brown	def.	Jake Wilson	Decision (unanimous)	3	3:00

=== Legacy Fighting Alliance 94: Demopoulos vs. Godinez ===
Legacy Fighting Alliance 94: Demopoulos vs. Godinez
- Promotion: Legacy Fighting Alliance
- Date: October 30, 2020
- Venue: Hartman Arena
- City: Park City, Kansas, U.S.

Event chronology
Legacy Fighting Alliance 93: Petroski vs. Jeffery	Legacy Fighting Alliance 94: Demopoulos vs. Godinez	Legacy Fighting Alliance 95: Pereira vs. Powell

Legacy Fighting Alliance 94: Demopoulos vs. Godinez was the ninety-fifth event of Legacy Fighting Alliance and took place on October 30, 2020. It aired on UFC Fight Pass.

Results

Main Card
Weight class				Method	Round	Time	Notes
Women's Strawweight	Lupita Godinez	def	Vanessa Demopoulos (c)	Decision (majority)	5	5:00	(Note: For the LFA Women's Strawweight Championship.)
Lightweight	Aaron McKenzie	def.	Joe Giannetti	Decision (unanimous)	3	5:00
Featherweight	Chase Gibson	def.	Thai Clark	Submission (D'arce choke)	2	4:18
Bantamweight	Fernie Garcia	def.	Ryan Hayes	Decision (split)	3	5:00
Middleweight	Ozzy Diaz	def.	Logan Woods	TKO (punches)	1	1:36
Middleweight	Jalin Fuller	def.	Miles Amos	Submission (D'arce choke)	3	1:59
Preliminary Card
Women's Strawweight	Loveth Young	def.	Reena Norville	TKO (punches)	1	2:16
Featherweight	Edwin Cooper Jr.	def.	Ethyn Ewing	Decision (unanimous)	3	5:00

=== Legacy Fighting Alliance 95: Pereira vs. Powell ===
Legacy Fighting Alliance 95: Pereira vs. Powell
- Promotion: Legacy Fighting Alliance
- Date: November 20, 2020
- Venue: Hartman Arena
- City: Park City, Kansas, U.S.

Event chronology
Legacy Fighting Alliance 94: Demopoulos vs. Godinez	Legacy Fighting Alliance 95: Pereira vs. Powell	Legacy Fighting Alliance 96: Mendonça vs. Dagvadorj

Legacy Fighting Alliance 95: Pereira vs. Powell was the ninety-sixth event of Legacy Fighting Alliance and took place on November 20, 2020. It aired on UFC Fight Pass.

Results

Main Card
Weight class				Method	Round	Time	Notes
Middleweight	Alex Pereira	def.	Thomas Powell	KO (punch)	1	4:04
Light Heavyweight	Myron Dennis	def.	Dylan Potter	Decision (split)	3	5:00
Flyweight	Victor Altamirano	def.	Lloyd McKinney	Submission (triangle choke)	2	1:57
Featherweight	Bruno Souza	def.	Guilherme Costa	TKO (punches)	2	2:16
Heavyweight	Jordan Heiderman	def.	Mauricio Blanco	Submission (rear-naked choke)	2	1:43

=== Legacy Fighting Alliance 96: Mendonça vs. Dagvadorj ===
Legacy Fighting Alliance 96: Mendonça vs. Dagvadorj
- Promotion: Legacy Fighting Alliance
- Date: December 4, 2020
- Venue: Hartman Arena
- City: Park City, Kansas, U.S.

Event chronology
Legacy Fighting Alliance 95: Pereira vs. Powell	Legacy Fighting Alliance 96: Mendonça vs. Dagvadorj	Legacy Fighting Alliance 97: Browne vs. Estrázulas

Legacy Fighting Alliance 96: Mendonça vs. Dagvadorj was the ninety-seventh event of Legacy Fighting Alliance and took place on December 4, 2020. It aired on UFC Fight Pass.

Results

Main Card
Weight class				Method	Round	Time	Notes
Welterweight	Maycon Mendonça	def.	Batsumberel Dagvadorj	Decision (unanimous)	5	5:00	(Note: For the vacant LFA Welterweight Championship.)
Catchweight (160 lbs)	Anthony Romero	def.	Zach Juusola	Decision (split)	3	5:00
Bantamweight	Mo Miller	def.	Regivaldo Carvalho	KO (slam)	2	2:57
Welterweight	Mark Martin	def.	Matthew Colquhoun	Decision (unanimous)	3	5:00
Women's Flyweight	Lisa Mauldin	def.	Mitzi Merry	Decision (unanimous)	3	5:00
Lightweight	William Starks	def.	Slava Borshchev	Decision (split)	3	5:00
Middleweight	Joseph Holmes	def.	Ryan Leininger	KO (knee)	1	1:38
