= Royce White =

American basketball player (born 1991)

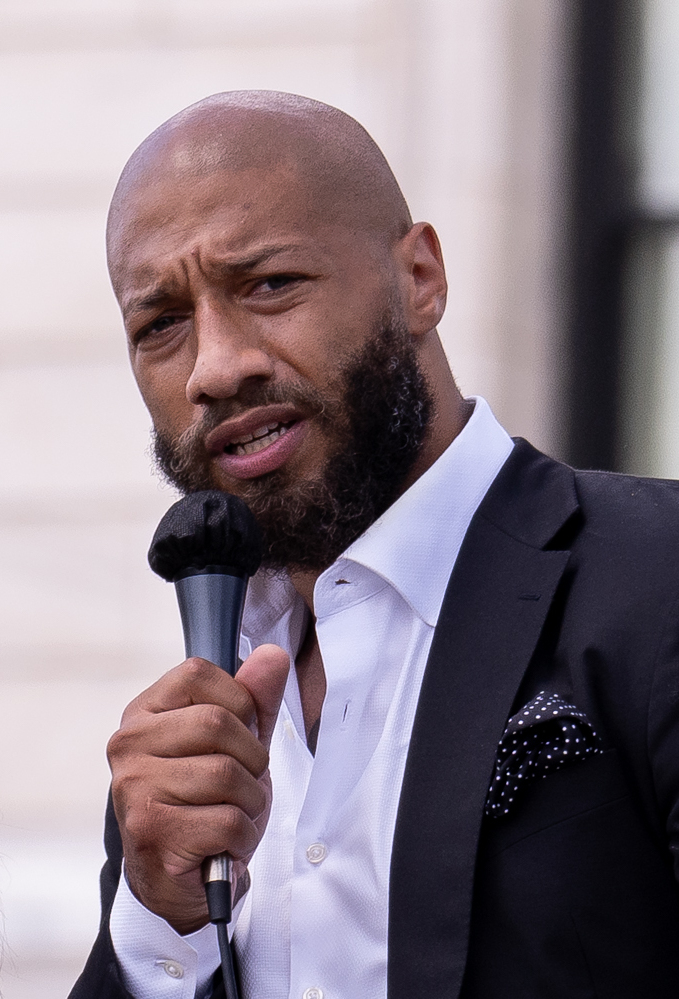
- White in 2020

Personal information
- Born: April 10, 1991 (age 35) Minneapolis, Minnesota, U.S.
- Listed height: 6 ft 8 in (2.03 m)
- Listed weight: 260 lb (118 kg)

Career information
- High school: DeLaSalle (Minneapolis, Minnesota); Hopkins (Hopkins, Minnesota)
- College: Iowa State (2011–2012)
- NBA draft: 2012: 1st round, 16th overall pick
- Drafted by: Houston Rockets
- Playing career: 2012–2018
- Position: Power forward
- Number: 35

Career history
- 2012–2013: Rio Grande Valley Vipers
- 2014: Sacramento Kings
- 2014: →Reno Bighorns
- 2016–2018: London Lightning

Career highlights
- 2× NBL Canada champion (2017, 2018); NBL Canada Most Valuable Player (2017); 2× All-NBL Canada First Team (2017, 2018); NBL Canada scoring champion (2018); First-team All-Big 12 (2012); Big 12 Newcomer of the Year (2012); Big 12 All-Rookie team (2012); Minnesota Mr. Basketball (2009)
- Stats at NBA.com
- Stats at Basketball Reference

Royce Alexander White (born April 10, 1991) is an American political candidate and former professional basketball player who was the Republican Party's nominee in the 2024 United States Senate election in Minnesota and is a Republican candidate for the 2028 presidential election.

A two-time Minnesota State High School League (MSHSL) champion, White was named a Class 3A MSHSL champion in 2006 as a freshman at DeLaSalle High School; as a senior, he was named Minnesota Mr. Basketball and won a H Class 4A MSHSL championship with Hopkins High School in 2009, leading Hopkins to a perfect (31–0) record. White played college basketball for the Iowa State Cyclones, leading the 2011–12 team in every major statistical category. White was selected by the Houston Rockets in the first round of the 2012 NBA draft. While White did not play for the Rockets, he played in three games for the Sacramento Kings in 2014. He gained notoriety for his generalized anxiety disorder (GAD), mainly triggered by a fear of flying, which led to disagreements with the Rockets over mental health issues and travel. He also played for the Rio Grande Valley Vipers and the Reno Bighorns of the NBA G League. From 2016 to 2018, White played for the London Lightning of the NBL Canada, winning an NBL Canada championship and an MVP award.

After initially leading several Black Lives Matter protests in 2020, White entered politics in 2022. He ran an unsuccessful campaign in the Republican primary for Minnesota's 5th congressional district as a right-wing populist. Later White ran as the party's nominee for the U.S. Senate and losing to incumbent Amy Klobuchar in 2024. Two years later, he unsuccessfully sought the party's U.S. Senate nomination once more in 2026, this time finishing third place. His campaigns have been noted for their embrace of conspiracy theories.

== Early life ==
White was born on April 10, 1991, in Minneapolis, the son of Kevin Tucker and Rebecca White. He is of multiracial origin, with Mexican, Norwegian, Welsh, and African-American ancestry. White's grandfather, Frank White, is a Minnesotan baseball historian, and his great-grandfather, Louis "Pud" White Jr., was a baseball player in Negro and semi-professional leagues. His uncle, Dave Winfield, was a professional baseball player.

White's father was not present in his life when he was young; they reconnected when White was 13. He witnessed his mother be mistreated by an abusive boyfriend. White split time living with his mother, his grandfather and other relatives in different areas of Minneapolis–Saint Paul. He was first diagnosed with mental health issues aged 16 when he had a "massive panic attack" after smoking marijuana.

== High school basketball career ==
White went to DeLaSalle High School for his freshman, sophomore, and junior years. The team won a state championship in 2006. Following his sophomore season, in which he led DeLaSalle to a 19–8 record, White participated in the 2007 LeBron James US Skills Academy in Akron, Ohio and The Nike Global Challenge at the University of Portland.

For his senior year, White attended Hopkins High School. The team won the Class 4A MSHSL Championship in 2009, giving him his second state championship. Hopkins finished 10th in the final USA Today national poll, with a 31–0 record. He was rated as the 2nd, 8th and 10th best high school power forward in the national class of 2009 by Rivals.com, ESPN.com and Scout.com, respectively. He had dozens of collegiate scholarship offers. White was one of 20 2009 Jordan Brand Classic All-Americans, was recognized by the St. Paul Pioneer Press as a First-Team All-State honoree, and was named the 2009 Minnesota Mr. Basketball.

College recruiting
Name	Hometown	School	Height	Weight	Commit date
Royce White; PF	Minneapolis, MN	DeLaSalle (MN); Hopkins (MN)	6 ft 7 in (2.01 m)	205 lb (93 kg)	Apr 23, 2008
Royce White; PF	Recruit ratings: Scout: Rivals: (94)				
Overall recruit ranking: Scout: 10 (PF) Rivals: 19, 2 (PF) ESPN: 35, 8 (PF)
Note: In many cases, Scout, Rivals, 247Sports, On3, and ESPN may conflict in their listings of height and weight.; In these cases, the average was taken. ESPN grades are on a 100-point scale.; Sources: "Minnesota Commit List for 2009". Rivals.; "Men's Basketball Recruiting". Scout.; "ESPN – Minnesota Golden Gophers Basketball Recruiting 2009". ESPN.; "Scout.com Team Recruiting Rankings". Scout.; "2009 Team Ranking". Rivals.

== College career ==
=== University of Minnesota ===
White pleaded guilty to theft and disorderly conduct in connection with an October 13, 2009, incident at the Mall of America; he was accused of taking $100 worth of clothes and of fifth-degree assault, when he allegedly pushed a mall security officer to the ground twice, but he claimed the security officer was charging at him and he was defending himself. He was suspended for the 2009–10 NCAA Division I men's basketball season.

White left the University of Minnesota in February 2010 without playing a game. White achieved better than a 3.0 grade point average in his first semester at Minnesota.

=== Iowa State University ===
White for the 2011–12 Cyclones vs. the Iowa Hawkeyes
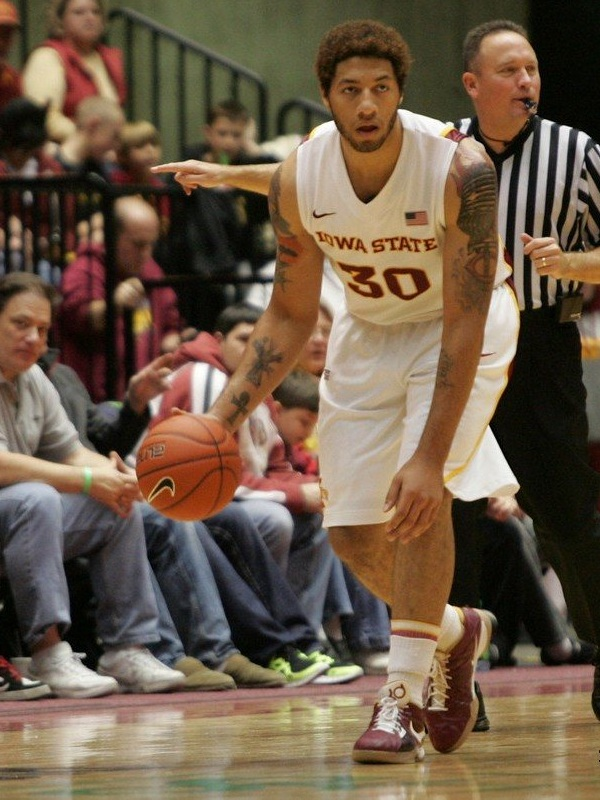
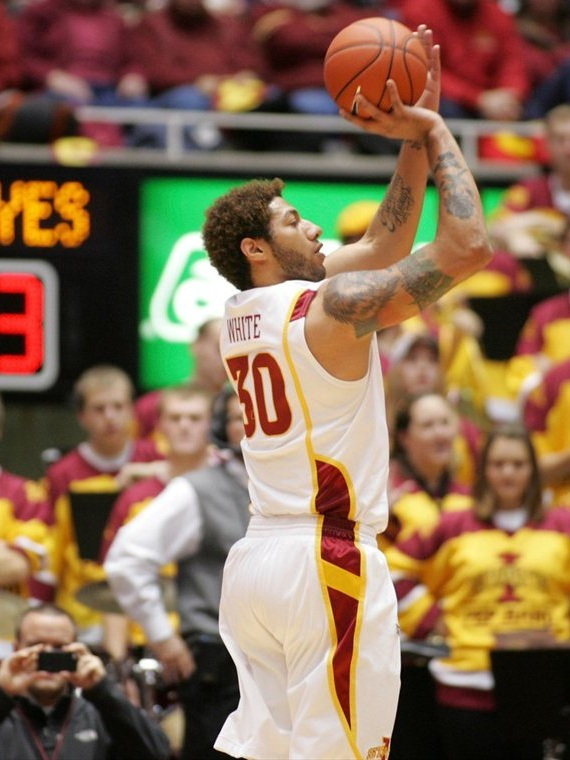
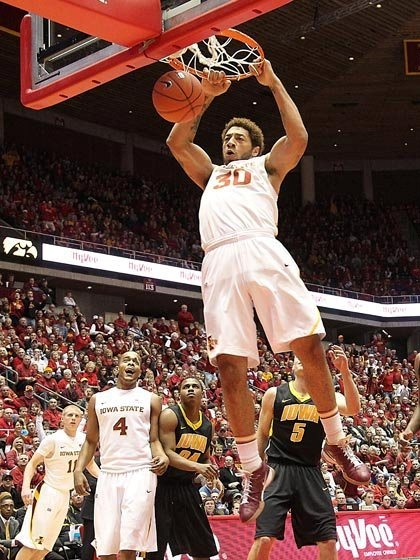

Because White did not officially depart Minnesota until the middle of his second semester, he was academically ineligible to receive a scholarship from any Division I school in 2010. He transferred to Iowa State prior to using any of his athletic eligibility at Minnesota and applied to the NCAA for a waiver to be eligible to play during the 2010–11 NCAA Division I men's basketball season, but the NCAA denied his waiver.

At Iowa State, White was voted the 2011–12 Big 12 Preseason Newcomer of the Year. During the season, he won the Phillips 66 Big 12 Rookie of the Week award three times.

White had 17 points and 10 rebounds in the 2012 Big 12 men's basketball tournament in Iowa State's loss to Texas. In Iowa State's opening game of the 2012 NCAA Men's Division I Basketball Tournament, White posted 15 points and 11 rebounds in a victory over Connecticut. His season concluded with a 23-point, nine-rebound, four-assist, and three-steal performance in a loss to Kentucky. White fouled out for the first time in his career in the game and ended the season with 11 double-doubles. White finished the season as the team leader in points, rebounds, assists, steals and blocks, making him the only player in Division I basketball to lead his team in all five categories.

On March 4, 2012, White was named the unanimous Big 12 Newcomer of the Year and was recognized as a first-team All-Big 12 selection and a unanimous Big 12 All-Rookie Team selection by the Big 12 coaches. In addition, he was selected as Big 12 Newcomer of the Year and was recognized as a First team All-Big 12 selection by both the Associated Press and the Kansas City Star. He concluded the regular season second in the Big 12 in rebounding and fifth in assists with averages of 9.2 and 5.2, respectively. On March 1, he was named to the 30-player midseason Naismith College Player of the Year Award watchlist. He was selected by the U.S. Basketball Writers Association to its 10-man 2011–12 Men's All-District VI (IA, MO, KS, OK, NE, ND, SD) Team. White was a first team selection to the National Association of Basketball Coaches Division I All‐District 8 team on March 14. White was named an honorable mention Associated Press All-American.

On March 21, 2012, White chose to forgo his junior and senior years at ISU to enter the 2012 NBA draft.

== Professional basketball career ==
=== 2012–2013 ===
White was called the "mystery pick" of the 2012 NBA draft due to his NBA-ready body, legal issues, point-forward skill set, and public disclosure of his severe fear of flying during his season at Iowa State. At the 2012 NBA Draft Combine, White measured at 6'8" and had the widest hands, 11.5 inches (29.2 cm), of any player participating. He was drafted by the Houston Rockets on June 28, 2012, with the 16th selection. He was represented by Andrew Vye and Andy Miller of the ASM Sports as his agents.

White has an anxiety disorder and a fear of flying. He asked the Rockets for permission to travel by bus when necessary in order to limit his flight schedule. The Rockets and White came to an agreement regarding travel, including allowing White travel by personal bus rather than flying. White missed the first week of training camp before this agreement was put in place.

A few games into the season, White had a dispute with the Rockets regarding mental health matters that led to his absence from the team. By December 26, 2012, he had not shown up to work with the Rockets, according to head coach Kevin McHale. On December 29, Houston assigned White to its D-League affiliate Rio Grande Valley Vipers. On December 30, White refused assignment to the Vipers. On January 6, 2013, the Rockets suspended White without pay for failing to perform his contract. On January 26, the Rockets and White mutually agreed that he would report to the Vipers on February 11. On February 12, White made his professional debut with the Vipers in a 139–122 win over the Maine Red Claws, playing 18 minutes off the bench and leading the team with eight rebounds.

A February 8 story in USA Today story explained White's situation. Although White endured 20 flights for travel during his season at Iowa State, the Rockets' NBA schedule called for 98 flights. White had attempted to cope with travel in college through the use of Benadryl and Xanax, but found that both reduced his energy level. White stated that he was concerned that the increased number of flights and the long-term use of the medications could lead to addiction.

On March 21, White announced via Twitter that following professional medical advice of team doctors along with his doctors, he would no longer be playing for the Vipers. After missing three road games to Indiana and Pennsylvania, White returned to the Vipers for their final six games. The Vipers went on to sweep three playoff series and win the 2013 championship, but White did not play in the playoffs. Over the course of the season, White traveled using a bus provided by the Rockets for 15 road games.

=== 2014 ===
On July 13, 2013, the Rockets traded White and the rights to Furkan Aldemir to the Philadelphia 76ers for future considerations. On September 27, at media day, White stated that he planned to travel with the team when necessary (even on its pre-season trip to Spain). However, White did not make the October 4 trip with the team to Spain. According to 76ers coach Brett Brown, the decision was made based on advice from the team physician. On October 25, 2013, White was waived by the 76ers.

On March 6, 2014, White signed a 10-day contract with the Sacramento Kings and was immediately assigned to the Reno Bighorns of the NBA D-League. He made his debut for the Bighorns the next day in a 112–86 win over the Idaho Stampede. On March 14, 2014, he was recalled by the Kings. On March 18, he signed a second 10-day contract with the Kings. On March 21, White made his NBA debut, playing 56 seconds and missing his only field-goal attempt in the Kings' 99–79 loss to the San Antonio Spurs. White's final NBA appearance came on March 26, 2014, in a 107–99 loss to the New York Knicks. Royce committed two fouls in seven minutes of action, but otherwise accumulated no statistics. After White's second 10-day contract expired, the Kings decided to part ways with him.

=== 2016–2018 ===
On December 8, 2016, White signed with the London Lightning of the NBL Canada. During the season, he set a league record for triple-doubles with 4 (plus one in the playoffs). On May 11, 2017, he was named the 2017 NBL Canada regular season league MVP. On June 5, White posted 34 points, 15 rebounds and 9 assists to lead the Lightning to their 3rd NBL Canada Championship since the league was formed in 2011.

On July 28, 2017, White re-signed with the London Lightning for the 2017–18 season. He led the league in scoring with 25.4 points per game. On April 27, 2018, White received an 11-game suspension during the 2018 playoffs for a verbal outburst with an official and the deputy commissioner of the league, effectively ending his season. White was named to the First Team All-NBLC. After the end of the season, the London Lightning announced that White would not be returning to the team.

On July 12, 2018, White signed a deal with Auxilium Torino of the Italian LBA and the EuroCup Basketball. However, he did not report for training camp and his contract was voided on August 23, 2018.

=== Other basketball endeavors ===
In May 2019, White was the first overall pick in the Big3 2019 draft. He was drafted by the Enemies team. He was ejected from his first game in the league on June 22 following a fight with Josh Smith. In 2021, White joined Power and participated in the team's eight weeks of playing time.

== Career playing statistics ==
Legend
GP	Games played	GS	Games started	MPG	Minutes per game
FG%	Field goal percentage	3P%	3-point field goal percentage	FT%	Free throw percentage
RPG	Rebounds per game	APG	Assists per game	SPG	Steals per game
BPG	Blocks per game	PPG	Points per game	**Bold**	Career high

=== College ===
Year	Team	GP	GS	MPG	FG%	3P%	FT%	RPG	APG	SPG	BPG	PPG
2011–12	Iowa State	34	33	31.5	.534	.333	.498	9.3	5.0	1.2	0.9	13.4

=== NBA ===
==== Regular season ====
Year	Team	GP	GS	MPG	FG%	3P%	FT%	RPG	APG	SPG	BPG	PPG
2013–14	Sacramento	3	0	3.0	.000	–	–	.0	.0	.0	.0	.0

=== NBA D-League ===
==== Regular season ====
Year	Team	GP	GS	MPG	FG%	3P%	FT%	RPG	APG	SPG	BPG	PPG
2012–13	Rio Grande	**16**	**8**	**25.6**	**.444**	.100	**.659**	**5.7**	**3.3**	.9	**.8**	**11.4**
2013–14	Reno	4	4	24.8	.367	**.333**	.625	4.3	2.8	**1.5**	.3	8.8
Career		20	12	25.4	.431	.211	.653	5.4	3.2	1.0	.7	10.9

== Mixed martial arts career ==
Royce White
- Other names: The Main Attraction
- Height: 6 ft 8 in (2.03 m)
- Weight: 260 lb (120 kg)
- Division: Heavyweight
- Team: The Academy (2019–present)
- Years active: 2019–2021 (MMA)

Mixed martial arts record
- Total: 1
- Wins: 0
- Losses: 1
- By decision: 1

Other information
- Mixed martial arts record from Sherdog

In early 2019, White released a book, MMA x NBA, A Critique of Modern Sport in America, and announced that he was transitioning into mixed martial arts.

After two years of training in mixed martial arts, White made his professional mixed martial arts debut against Daiqwon Buckley at LFA 120 on December 10, 2021. He lost the bout to Buckley via unanimous decision.

=== Mixed martial arts record ===
Professional record breakdown
1 match	0 wins	1 loss
By decision	0	1

Res.	Record	Opponent	Method	Event	Date	Round	Time	Location	Notes
Loss	0–1	Daiqwon Buckley	Decision (unanimous)	LFA 120	December 10, 2021	3	5:00	Prior Lake, Minnesota, United States	

== Political career ==
=== Views ===
The New York Post referred to White as "a far-right populist", who has "embraced conspiracy theories ranging from the origins of the coronavirus to the integrity of the 2020 presidential election and satanic influences in the federal government." White has referred to the Federal Reserve as a "corporate merged power – of globalist power, of financial tyranny" and has criticized the "pervasive effect" of the LGBTQ community on society. The Minnesota Reformer has referred to White as a "far-right conspiracy theorist" running an "anti-establishment campaign", part of a group of "burn-it-all-down activists" in the Minnesota Republican Party.

White previously described himself on his Twitter profile as "Antisemitic, Blackface, Extremist, Cis-Male, Sexist, Misogynist, Homophobic, Transphobic." When asked about this description by a critic, White said: "I was listing all the things I've been called by people like you."

According to an opinion editorial in The New York Times, in 2023, White appeared on Steve Bannon's podcast and said: "Look, let's just be frank. Women have become too mouthy." This comment was later circulated by the Kamala Harris presidential campaign.

In August 2026, White claimed he is identifying as a transgender woman while declaring for the Women's National Basketball Association (WNBA) draft as a challenge to the WNBA's ambiguous policy on transgender athletes, following a similar announcement by Enes Kanter Freedom.

=== 2020 Black Lives Matter protests ===
White led several protests in the wake of the murder of George Floyd. While these protests were described as Black Lives Matter protests and associated with that movement, White later stated on his website that he was "never apart [sic] of the Black Lives Matter organization".

=== 2021 Uyghur genocide protests ===
On July 10, 2021, White received media attention for his protest against the Uyghur genocide during a Big3 postgame interview. Commentators contrasted his statements with stances taken by the NBA.

=== 2022 campaign for the House of Representatives ===
On February 22, 2022, White announced he would run for the Republican nomination for the United States House of Representatives in Minnesota's 5th congressional district, a seat represented by Ilhan Omar. His campaign was endorsed by former President Donald Trump's advisor, Steve Bannon, and he appeared on the radio show of Alex Jones. White lost the Republican primary to Cicely Davis. According to a report from Axios, White did not vote for his own campaign in the 2022 primary. In 2024, it was revealed that a week after the election, the campaign spent more than $1,200 at a strip club in Miami.

=== 2024 campaign for United States Senate ===
On August 16, 2023, White announced, via Twitter, that he would be running for the U.S. Senate in 2024 as a Republican in the State of Minnesota. He won the state party's endorsement on May 18, 2024, and won the Republican primary on August 13, 2024.

In June 2024, White tweeted a map of drinking fountains in Minneapolis, claiming it was a map of crimes. On his campaign website, he references his mental health struggles and also claims that mental illness in contemporary society was caused by materialism and a decline in spirituality. He also calls for an American jubilee which would eliminate taxes. In August 2024, White said that Republicans who think "suburban women are gonna be the path to victory" have a "cucked mentality".

White's campaign website included endorsements from Jason Whitlock, and Trump allies Steve Bannon, Kari Lake, Mike Lindell and Alex Jones. While campaigning, White has repeated conspiracy theories, including references to "Jewish elites". The Republican Jewish Coalition has described him as antisemitic, which White's campaign denied. White's views have also been described by critics as misogynistic and homophobic. White defended Kanye West from charges of antisemitism after West praised Adolf Hitler. He has criticized Israel as the "lynchpin of the New World Order."

In June 2024, the watchdog group Campaign Legal Center filed a complaint with the Federal Election Commission (FEC), accusing White of misappropriating more than $157,000 in campaign funds for personal expenses. In July, The Daily Beast published an article alleging that White spent donor funds from his 2022 congressional campaign at a strip club in Miami after his election loss. The article also said that FEC filings from the 2022 campaign showed "more than $100,000 in outgoing wire transfers and checks with no stated recipient or purpose". White has denied any improper use of donor money, and reported reimbursing his campaign for expenses including the strip club in an FEC filing shortly after the publication of the Daily Beast article. He wrote in a social media post that he enjoys the food at the club.

White criticized the National Republican Senatorial Committee for providing insufficient support to his campaign. Pat Garofalo, a Republican former member of the Minnesota House of Representatives, has said that other members of the party are "going to keep [White] six feet away" because of the accusations related to campaign spending.

==== World War II statements ====
In October 2024, one of White's tweets from 2022 began circulating, in which he opined that "The bad guys won World War II. There were no 'good guys' in that war. The controlling interests had a jump ball. If you look closely, you see the link between liberalism and communism in the Allied forces. Remember what Gen[eral] Patton said and why they capped him." George Patton was not murdered, but died from complications following a car crash in 1945.

When asked about the tweet, White told Newsweek: "By 'bad guys,' I mean those who benefited from World War II without fighting in it—people who funded the wars, gained political power or institutional prominence," he said. "I'm talking about entities like the United Nations, which I'm not the first to criticize, and organizations like the [International Monetary Fund] and the World Bank. The crony capitalism that spread globally after the war—yes, they won World War II."

=== 2026 U.S. Senate campaign ===
Immediately following his loss in the 2024 Senate race, White expressed interest in running again in 2026, this time for the seat held by Democratic Senator Tina Smith. He had also expressed interest in running for governor. On February 14, the day after Smith announced she would not run for a second full term, White affirmed he was running for the now-vacant Senate seat. He lost to Michele Tafoya, coming in third place with 45,303 votes.

=== 2028 presidential campaign ===
On August 12, following his defeat in the 2026 Senate primary in Minnesota, White announced that he would seek the Republican nomination for president in 2028.

== Electoral history ==
=== 2022 ===
2022 U.S. House of Representatives MN-5 Republican primary results
Party	Candidate	Votes	%
Republican	Cicely Davis	4,765	48.0
Republican	Royce White	3,689	37.2
Republican	Guy Gaskin	1,476	14.9
Total votes		9,930	100.0

=== 2024 ===
2024 U.S. Senate Republican primary results in Minnesota
Party	Candidate	Votes	%
Republican	Royce White	74,814	38.50%
Republican	Joe Fraser	56,909	29.29%
Republican	Raymond Petersen	16,237	8.36%
Republican	Alycia Gruenhagen	15,017	7.73%
Republican	John Berman	14,158	7.29%
Republican	Patrick Munro	9,444	4.86%
Republican	Christopher Seymore	5,020	2.58%
Republican	Loner Blue	2,727	1.40%
Total votes		194,326	100.0%

2024 United States Senate election in Minnesota
Party	Candidate	Votes	%	±%
Democratic (DFL)	Amy Klobuchar (incumbent)	1,792,441	56.20%	−4.11%
Republican	Royce White	1,291,712	40.50%	+4.29%
Libertarian	Rebecca Whiting	55,215	1.73%	N/A
Independence	Joyce Lacey	46,377	1.45%	N/A
Write-in		3,578	0.11%	+0.07%
Total votes		3,189,323	100.00%	N/A
Democratic (DFL) hold				

=== 2026 ===
US Senate Republican primary in Minnesota
Party	Candidate	Votes	%
Republican	Michele Tafoya	211,201	51.99%
Republican	Adam Schwarze	97,133	23.93%
Republican	Royce White	45,303	11.16%
Republican	Tom Weiler	24,199	5.96%
Republican	Joyce Lacey	7,482	1.84%
Republican	Patrick Munro	7,116	1.75%
Republican	Cynthia Gail	5,964	1.47%
Republican	Bob Carney Jr.	5,683	1.40%
Republican	Ahmad R. Hassan	1,759	0.43%
Total votes		405,840	100.00%

== Personal life ==
White is Catholic. He has four children and has faced court actions after falling behind on court-mandated child support payments.

White's grandfather, Frank White, has distanced himself from White, stating: "There's no way I can support my grandson supporting the GOP, and in essence, Trump."

A judge found that White had abused his ex-wife and teenage son, leading to a restraining order being issued against White in February 2026, requiring him to stay away from his former wife and their son. Said restraining order is enforceable for 50 years. The court found that White had "chased his minor son, grabbed him by the neck, and threw him into the metal ball rack" and noted a history of White's "alleged physical violence, intimidation, and controlling behavior, including unauthorized access to her communications."

Party political offices
Preceded by Jim Newberger	Republican nominee for U.S. Senator from Minnesota (Class 1); 2024	Most recent
