= 2021 in Legacy Fighting Alliance =

Information
- Promotion: Legacy Fighting Alliance
- First date aired: January 15, 2021
- Last date aired: December 10, 2021

2021 was the fifth year in the history of Legacy Fighting Alliance, a mixed martial arts promotion based in the United States.

== List of events ==
#	Event	Date	Venue	Location
1	LFA 97: Browne vs. Estrázulas	January 15, 2021	Hartman Arena	Park City, Kansas, U.S.
2	LFA 98: Fremd vs. Oliveira	January 29, 2021	Hartman Arena	Park City, Kansas, U.S.
3	LFA 99: Dennis vs. Cherant	February 12, 2021	Hartman Arena	Park City, Kansas, U.S.
4	LFA 100: Altamirano vs. Smith	February 19, 2021	Hartman Arena	Park City, Kansas, U.S.
5	LFA 101: Kalani vs. Cummins	March 12, 2021	Grand Casino Hotel & Resort	Shawnee, Oklahoma, U.S.
6	LFA 102: Souza vs. Johns	March 19, 2021	Grand Casino Hotel & Resort	Shawnee, Oklahoma, U.S.
7	LFA 103: Carlyle vs. Dagvadorj	March 26, 2021	Grand Casino Hotel & Resort	Shawnee, Oklahoma, U.S.
8	LFA 104: McKenzie vs. Phillips	April 16, 2021	Grand Casino Hotel & Resort	Shawnee, Oklahoma, U.S.
9	LFA 105: Rodriguez vs. Gotsyk	April 23, 2021	Grand Casino Hotel & Resort	Shawnee, Oklahoma, U.S.
10	LFA 106: Silveira vs. Viana	April 30, 2021	Grand Casino Hotel & Resort	Shawnee, Oklahoma, U.S.
11	LFA 107: Kirk vs. Swain	May 14, 2021	Sanford Pentagon	Sioux Falls, South Dakota, U.S.
12	LFA 108: Fremd vs. Rodrigues	May 21, 2021	Sanford Pentagon	Sioux Falls, South Dakota, U.S.
13	LFA 109: McKinney vs. Irizarry	June 5, 2021	Grand Casino Hotel & Resort	Shawnee, Oklahoma, U.S.
14	LFA 110: Johnson vs. Horiuchi	July 2, 2021	Grand Casino Hotel & Resort	Shawnee, Oklahoma, U.S.
15	LFA 111: De Sa vs. Bonfim	July 16, 2021	Upper Arena	Rio de Janeiro, Brazil
16	LFA 112: Welterweight Tournament	July 19, 2021	Upper Arena	Rio de Janeiro, Brazil
17	LFA 113: Lewis vs. Petersen	July 30, 2021	Bell County Expo Center	Belton, Texas, U.S.
18	LFA 114: Souza vs. Garcia	August 27, 2021	The Factory	St. Louis, Missouri, U.S.
19	LFA 115: Silveira vs. Cummins	September 24, 2021	Oshkosh Arena	Oshkosh, Wisconsin, U.S.
20	LFA 116: Fremd vs. Valente	October 22, 2021	Dobson Arena	Vail, Colorado, U.S.
21	LFA 117: Dias vs. Tanaka	November 5, 2021	Visalia Convention Center	Visalia, California, U.S.
22	LFA 118: Askar vs. Gomes	November 12, 2021	Los Angeles-Burbank Marriott Convention Center	Burbank, California, U.S.
23	LFA 119: Silveira vs. Revel	December 3, 2021	Arizona Federal Theatre	Phoenix, Arizona, U.S.
24	LFA 120: Cantuária vs. Horth	December 10, 2021	Mystic Lake Casino Hotel	Prior Lake, Minnesota, U.S.

== LFA Middleweight Tournament ==
In 2021, LFA organized a Middleweight tournament that will crown the Middleweight champion.

Semi-finals
(United States) Josh Fremd	KO
(Brazil) Bruno Oliveira	1
(United States) Al Matavao	2
(Brazil) Gregory Rodrigues	KO

Final
(United States) Josh Fremd	1
(Brazil) Gregory Rodrigues	KO

== Legacy Fighting Alliance 97: Browne vs. Estrázulas ==
Legacy Fighting Alliance 97: Browne vs. Estrázulas
- Promotion: Legacy Fighting Alliance
- Date: January 15, 2021
- Venue: Hartman Arena
- City: Park City, Kansas, U.S.

Event chronology
Legacy Fighting Alliance 96: Mendonça vs. Dagvadorj	Legacy Fighting Alliance 97: Browne vs. Estrázulas	Legacy Fighting Alliance 98: Fremd vs. Oliveira

Legacy Fighting Alliance 97: Browne vs. Estrázulas is the ninety-eighth event of Legacy Fighting Alliance and will take place on January 15, 2021. It aired on UFC Fight Pass.

=== Background ===
The event was headlined by a fight between Nick Browne and Arthur Estrazulas, for the vacant LFA Lightweight title.

In the co-main event, the former LFA Lightweight title challenger Jacob Rosales faced Jose Martinez.

=== Results ===
Main Card
Weight class				Method	Round	Time	Notes
Lightweight	Nick Browne	def.	Arthur Estrázulas	Decision (unanimous)	5	5:00	(Note: For the vacant LFA Lightweight Championship.)
Lightweight	Jacob Rosales	def.	Jose Martinez	Decision (unanimous)	3	5:00
Featherweight	Kamuela Kirk	def.	Guilherme Santos	TKO (punches)	1	4:25
Women's Strawweight	Loveth Young	def.	Kelly D'Angelo	TKO (punches)	2	1:36
Featherweight	Michael Stack	def.	Jordan Mapa	TKO (punches)	2	4:00
Welterweight	Josh Quinlan	def.	Joe Boerschig	TKO (punches)	3	3:28
Heavyweight	Thomas Petersen	def.	Kimo Luis	KO (punch)	1	0:19
Preliminary Card
Women's Flyweight	Claire Guthrie	def.	Nadine Mandiau	Decision (unanimous)	3	5:00
Lightweight	Shane Shapiro	def.	Cam Ansel	Submission (kimura)	1	1:44

== Legacy Fighting Alliance 98: Fremd vs. Oliveira ==
Legacy Fighting Alliance 98: Fremd vs. Oliveira
- Promotion: Legacy Fighting Alliance
- Date: January 29, 2021
- Venue: Hartman Arena
- City: Park City, Kansas, U.S.

Event chronology
Legacy Fighting Alliance 97: Browne vs. Estrázulas	Legacy Fighting Alliance 98: Fremd vs. Oliveira	Legacy Fighting Alliance 99: Dennis vs. Cherant

Legacy Fighting Alliance 98: Fremd vs. Oliveira is the ninety-ninth event of Legacy Fighting Alliance and will take place on January 29, 2021. It aired on UFC Fight Pass.

=== Background ===
The event was headlined by a middleweight bout between Josh Fremd and Bruno Oliveira, which serves as the first middleweight tournament semi-final.

=== Results ===
Main Card
Weight class				Method	Round	Time	Notes
Middleweight	Josh Fremd	def.	Bruno Oliveira	KO (punches)	1	2:37
Lightweight	Lucas Clay	def.	J.J. Okanovich	Decision (unanimous)	3	5:00
Bantamweight	Richard Palencia	def.	Jeimeson Saudino	Decision (unanimous)	3	5:00
Lightweight	Dakota Bush	def.	Austin Clem	TKO (head kick and punches)	1	0:57
Women's Strawweight	Tabatha Ricci	def.	Vanessa Marie Grimes	Submission (armbar)	1	1:07
Light Heavyweight	Joshua Silveira	def.	Matthew Paul	Submission (rear-naked choke)	1	2:46
Light Heavyweight	Zac Pauga	def.	James Ashby Thomas	TKO (elbows and punches)	1	2:21
Preliminary Card
Middleweight	Obinwa Ikebunna	def.	Dan Olajiga	Submission (armbar)	1	0:58

== Legacy Fighting Alliance 99: Dennis vs. Cherant ==
Legacy Fighting Alliance 99: Dennis vs. Cherant
- Promotion: Legacy Fighting Alliance
- Date: February 12, 2021
- Venue: Hartman Arena
- City: Park City, Kansas, U.S.

Event chronology
Legacy Fighting Alliance 98: Fremd vs. Oliveira	Legacy Fighting Alliance 99: Dennis vs. Cherant	Legacy Fighting Alliance 100: Altamirano vs. Smith

Legacy Fighting Alliance 99: Dennis vs. Cherant is the hundredth event of Legacy Fighting Alliance and will take place on February 12, 2021. It aired on UFC Fight Pass.

=== Background ===
The event was headlined by a fight between Myron Dennis and Fabio Cherant for the LFA Light Heavyweight Championship.

=== Results ===
Main Card
Weight class				Method	Round	Time	Notes
Light Heavyweight	Fabio Cherant	def.	Myron Dennis	Decision (unanimous)	5	5:00	(Note: For the vacant LFA Light Heavyweight Championship.)
Lightweight	Brant Moore	def.	Ago Huskić	Decision (unanimous)	3	5:00
Featherweight	Fernando Padilla	def.	Nate Richardson	Decision (split)	3	5:00
Middleweight	Cody Brundage	def.	Joseph Kropschot	Submission (arm-triangle choke)	3	0:39
Women's Flyweight	Flore Hani	def.	Valerie Ann Marie Soto	Decision (unanimous)	3	5:00
Welterweight	Darian Weeks	def.	Craig Fairley	TKO (punches)	2	1:51
Heavyweight	Trevor Wallace	def.	Cesar Gutierrez	TKO (punches)	1	0:58
Preliminary Card
Women's Flyweight	Gerrica Trias	def.	Kawehi Wallace	TKO (punches)	3	0:56
Flyweight	Manuel Medina	def.	Chancey Wilson	Submission (triangle choke)	1	1:09

== Legacy Fighting Alliance 100: Altamirano vs. Smith ==
Legacy Fighting Alliance 100: Altamirano vs. Smith
- Promotion: Legacy Fighting Alliance
- Date: February 19, 2021
- Venue: Hartman Arena
- City: Park City, Kansas, U.S.

Event chronology
Legacy Fighting Alliance 99: Dennis vs. Cherant	Legacy Fighting Alliance 100: Altamirano vs. Smith	Legacy Fighting Alliance 101: Kalani vs. Cummins

Legacy Fighting Alliance 100: Altamirano vs. Smith is the hundredth-first event of Legacy Fighting Alliance and took place on February 19, 2021. It aired on UFC Fight Pass.

=== Background ===
The event was supposed to be headlined by a flyweight bout between LFA's all-time wins leader Victor "El Magnifico" Altamirano and top undefeated Brazilian prospect Carlos "Tizil" Mota. The co-main event will showcase the second middleweight tournament semi-final between LFA standouts Anthony "SugaFoot" Adams and Gregory "RoboCop" Rodrigues. However, on February 13, Carlos Mota was pulled from the fight and replaced by Nate Smith.

=== Results ===
Main Card
Weight class				Method	Round	Time	Notes
Flyweight	Victor Altamirano	def.	Nate Smith	Decision (unanimous)	5	5:00	(Note: For the vacant LFA Flyweight Championship.)
Flyweight	Charles Johnson	def.	Karlee Pangilinan	Submission (anaconda choke)	2	1:41
Featherweight	Steven Nguyen	def.	Jorge Juarez	KO (punches)	1	0:30
Lightweight	Tommy Aaron	def.	Gerald Scott	Submission (rear-naked choke)	3	3:57
Bantamweight	Christian Natividad	def.	Evan Woolsey	Decision (unanimous)	3	5:00
Preliminary Card
Women's Bantamweight	Emmanuela Moliere	def.	Amber Danielson-Smith	Decision (unanimous)	3	5:00
Amateur Bouts
Women's Strawweight	Maria Henderson	def.	Amanda Mitchell	Decision (unanimous)	3	3:00

== Legacy Fighting Alliance 101: Kalani vs. Cummins ==
Legacy Fighting Alliance 101: Kalani vs. Cummins
- Promotion: Legacy Fighting Alliance
- Date: March 12, 2021
- Venue: Grand Casino Hotel & Resort
- City: Shawnee, Oklahoma, U.S.

Event chronology
Legacy Fighting Alliance 100: Altamirano vs. Smith	Legacy Fighting Alliance 101: Kalani vs. Cummins	Legacy Fighting Alliance 102: Souza vs. Johns

Legacy Fighting Alliance 101: Kalani vs. Cummins is the hundredth-second event of Legacy Fighting Alliance and took place on March 12, 2021. It aired on UFC Fight Pass.

=== Background ===
LFA 101 was headlined by a bout between two middleweight prospects: Maika Graf and the undefeated AJ Dobson.

=== Results ===
Main Card
Weight class				Method	Round	Time	Notes
Light Heavyweight	Tee Cummins	def.	Anthony Kalani	TKO (punches)	3	1:20
Welterweight	Jalin Fuller	def.	Treston Vines	KO (punches)	1	2:32
Catchweight (130 lb)	Mark Climaco	def.	Pololu Nakanelua	Decision (unanimous)	3	5:00
Lightweight	AJ Nichols	def.	Miguel Jacob	TKO (elbows and punches)	3	2:41
Women's Strawweight	Jaqueline Amorim	def.	Taisha Gandy	Submission (rear-naked choke)	1	0:33
Flyweight	Alden Coria	def.	Rashaad Robinson	TKO (punches)	2	1:05
Middleweight	Hunter Colvin	def.	Obinwa Ikebunna	Submission (rear-naked choke)	1	2:49
Preliminary Card
Welterweight	Elmar Umarov	def.	Cody King	TKO (punches and elbows)	1	2:20

== Legacy Fighting Alliance 102: Souza vs. Johns ==
Legacy Fighting Alliance 102: Souza vs. Johns
- Promotion: Legacy Fighting Alliance
- Date: March 19, 2021
- Venue: Grand Casino Hotel & Resort
- City: Shawnee, Oklahoma, U.S.

Event chronology
Legacy Fighting Alliance 101: Kalani vs. Cummins	Legacy Fighting Alliance 102: Souza vs. Johns	Legacy Fighting Alliance 103: Carlyle vs. Dagvadorj

Legacy Fighting Alliance 102: Souza vs. Johns is the hundredth-third event of Legacy Fighting Alliance and took place on March 19, 2021. It aired on UFC Fight Pass.

=== Background ===
The main event featured a featherweight showdown between LFA standouts Bruno "The Tiger" Souza vs. Elijah "Baby" Johns. The co-main event showcased the second middleweight tournament semi-final bout between Dana White's Contender Series alumni Gregory Rodrigues and Al "Sweetness" Matavao.

=== Results ===
Main Card
Weight class				Method	Round	Time	Notes
Featherweight	Bruno Souza	def.	Elijah Johns	Decision (split)	3	5:00
Middleweight	Gregory Rodrigues	def.	Al Matavao	KO (punch)	2	1:02
Welterweight	Nikolay Veretennikov	def.	Steve Jones	Decision (unanimous)	3	5:00
Featherweight	Javier Garcia	def.	A.J. Cunningham	Decision (unanimous)	3	5:00
Bantamweight	Brandon Lewis	def.	Jimmy Meza	Decision (split)	3	5:00
Featherweight	Alberto Rodriguez	def.	Chris Mecate	TKO (punches)	1	1:12
Welterweight	Haris Talundžić	def.	Luis Iniguez	Decision (unanimous)	3	5:00
Preliminary Card
Welterweight	Archie Colgan	def.	Andrew Claborn	TKO (elbow)	3	3:49

== Legacy Fighting Alliance 103: Carlyle vs. Dagvadorj ==
Legacy Fighting Alliance 103: Carlyle vs. Dagvadorj
- Promotion: Legacy Fighting Alliance
- Date: March 26, 2021
- Venue: Grand Casino Hotel & Resort
- City: Shawnee, Oklahoma, U.S.

Event chronology
Legacy Fighting Alliance 102: Souza vs. Johns	Legacy Fighting Alliance 103: Carlyle vs. Dagvadorj	Legacy Fighting Alliance 104: McKenzie vs. Phillips

Legacy Fighting Alliance 103: Carlyle vs. Dagvadorj is the hundredth-fourth event of Legacy Fighting Alliance and took place on March 26, 2021. It aired on UFC Fight Pass.

=== Background ===
The event was headlined by a lightweight bout between the UFC veteran Spike Carlyle and the one-time LFA Welterweight title challenger Batsumberel Dagvadorj.

=== Results ===
Main Card
Weight class				Method	Round	Time	Notes
Lightweight	Spike Carlyle	def.	Batsumberel Dagvadorj	Submission (rear-naked choke)	1	4:00
Women's Strawweight	Vanessa Demopoulos	def.	Cynthia Arceo	TKO (punches)	1	0:37
Lightweight	Abdul-Kareem Al-Selwady	def.	Jake Sebastian	TKO (punches)	1	4:12
Bantamweight	Fernie Garcia	def.	Isaiah Batin-Gonzalez	Decision (unanimous)	3	5:00
Bantamweight	Luciano Ramos	def.	Kendrick Latchman	Decision (unanimous)	3	5:00
Welterweight	Josh Quinlan	def.	Dallas Jennings	Submission (rear-naked choke)	3	2:36
Preliminary Card
Lightweight	Jacobi Jones	def.	Cameron Ansel	Submission (arm-triangle choke)	1	2:22
Women's Strawweight	Giovanna Canuto	def.	Amanda Borg	Submission (armbar)	1	4:51

== Legacy Fighting Alliance 104: McKenzie vs. Phillips ==
Legacy Fighting Alliance 104: McKenzie vs. Phillips
- Promotion: Legacy Fighting Alliance
- Date: April 16, 2021
- Venue: Grand Casino Hotel & Resort
- City: Shawnee, Oklahoma, U.S.

Event chronology
Legacy Fighting Alliance 103: Carlyle vs. Dagvadorj	Legacy Fighting Alliance 104: McKenzie vs. Phillips	Legacy Fighting Alliance 105: Rodriguez vs. Gotsyk

Legacy Fighting Alliance 104: McKenzie vs. Phillips is the hundredth-fifth event of Legacy Fighting Alliance and took place on April 16, 2021. It aired on UFC Fight Pass.

=== Background ===
The event was headlined by a lightweight contest between Aaron McKenzie and Brandon Phillips.

=== Results ===
Main Card
Weight class				Method	Round	Time	Notes
Lightweight	Aaron McKenzie	def.	Brandon Phillips	Decision (unanimous)	3	5:00
Flyweight	Yuma Horiuchi	def.	Donavon Frelow	Submission (armbar)	2	1:31
Middleweight	Joel Bauman	def.	Julien Leblanc	Decision (unanimous)	3	5:00
Welterweight	Chris Brown	def.	Kelvin Rayford	Decision (unanimous)	3	5:00
Catchweight (150 lb)	Javier Garcia	def.	Timothy Teves	Submission (triangle choke)	3	4:49
Heavyweight	Thomas Petersen	def.	Odell Pantin	TKO (punches)	1	3:33
Middleweight	Roland Dunlap	def.	Obinwa Ikebunna	KO (slam)	1	4:19
Preliminary Card
Women's Strawweight	Sidney Trillo	def.	Melissa Oddessa	Decision (split)	3	5:00
Featherweight	Gunner Coronado	def.	Tristin Kamaka	TKO (punches)	3	3:02

== Legacy Fighting Alliance 105: Rodriguez vs. Gotsyk ==
Legacy Fighting Alliance 105: Rodriguez vs. Gotsyk
- Promotion: Legacy Fighting Alliance
- Date: April 23, 2021
- Venue: Grand Casino Hotel & Resort
- City: Shawnee, Oklahoma, U.S.

Event chronology
Legacy Fighting Alliance 104: McKenzie vs. Phillips	Legacy Fighting Alliance 105: Rodriguez vs. Gotsyk	Legacy Fighting Alliance 106: Silveira vs. Viana

Legacy Fighting Alliance 105: Rodriguez vs. Gotsyk is the hundredth-sixth event of Legacy Fighting Alliance and took place on April 23, 2021. It aired on UFC Fight Pass.

=== Background ===
The event was headlined by bout for the LFA Women's Strawweight Championship between Svetlana Gotsyk and Piera Rodriguez.

=== Results ===
Main Card
Weight class				Method	Round	Time	Notes
Women's Strawweight	Piera Rodríguez	def.	Svetlana Gotsyk	TKO (punches)	5	1:16	(Note: For the vacant LFA Women's Strawweight Championship)
Featherweight	Canaan Kawaihae	def.	Jake Childers	Submission (ninja choke)	1	0:20
Light Heavyweight	Bruno Souto	def.	Cristhian Torres	Decision (unanimous)	3	5:00
Welterweight	Mark Martin	def.	Renato Valente	Decision (split)	3	5:00
Women's Strawweight	Tabatha Ricci	def.	Shawna Ormsby	TKO (punches)	2	4:50
Light Heavyweight	Zac Pauga	def.	Logan Nail	Decision (unanimous)	3	5:00
Preliminary Card
Flyweight	Braden Pagaoa	def.	Josh Islas	TKO (punches)	1	0:12
Welterweight	Jean-Paul Bosnoyan	def.	Richardson Santos	Submission (guillotine choke)	1	1:14

== Legacy Fighting Alliance 106: Silveira vs. Viana ==
Legacy Fighting Alliance 106: Silveira vs. Viana
- Promotion: Legacy Fighting Alliance
- Date: April 30, 2021
- Venue: Grand Casino Hotel & Resort
- City: Shawnee, Oklahoma, U.S.

Event chronology
Legacy Fighting Alliance 105: Rodriguez vs. Gotsyk	Legacy Fighting Alliance 106: Silveira vs. Viana	Legacy Fighting Alliance 107: Carvalho vs. Davlatmurodov

Legacy Fighting Alliance 106: Silveira vs. Viana is the hundredth-seventh event of Legacy Fighting Alliance and took place on April 30, 2021. It aired on UFC Fight Pass.

=== Background ===
A light heavyweight bout between Joshua Silveira and Rafael Viana served as the main event.

=== Results ===
Main Card
Weight class				Method	Round	Time	Notes
Light Heavyweight	Joshua Silveira	def.	Rafael Viana	Submission (rear-naked choke)	1	0:41
Lightweight	Terrance McKinney	def.	Toninho Gavinho	KO (head kick)	1	0:17
Bantamweight	Kyle Estrada	def.	Tyler Wilson	Decision (unanimous)	3	5:00
Featherweight	Cheyden Leialoha	def.	Edwin Chavez	Decision (unanimous)	3	5:00
Heavyweight	Bubba Grant	def.	Trevor Wallace	TKO (punches)	1	1:36
Featherweight	Mando Gutierrez	def.	William Elliott	Submission (rear-naked choke)	1	4:55
Preliminary Card
Welterweight	Ryan Charlebois	def.	Joseph Galaviz	Decision (unanimous)	3	5:00

== Legacy Fighting Alliance 107: Kirk vs. Swain ==
Legacy Fighting Alliance 107: Kirk vs. Swain
- Promotion: Legacy Fighting Alliance
- Date: May 14, 2021
- Venue: Sanford Pentagon
- City: Sioux Falls, South Dakota, U.S.

Event chronology
Legacy Fighting Alliance 106: Silveira vs. Viana	Legacy Fighting Alliance 107: Kirk vs. Swain	Legacy Fighting Alliance 108: Fremd vs. Rodrigues

Legacy Fighting Alliance 107: Kirk vs. Swain is the hundredth-eighth event of Legacy Fighting Alliance and took place on May 14, 2021. It aired on UFC Fight Pass.

=== Background ===
The main event featured a middleweight showdown between two of the most accomplished fighters in the division. Rafael Carvalho, former Bellator Middleweight Champion, faced emerging Tajik, Sharaf Davlatmurodov, who was riding a 5-fight win streak, which includes a win over Bellator middleweight tournament runner-up Brett Cooper. The day after the announcement of the bout, it was announced that Carvalho was to face Lorenz Larkin at Bellator 258.

=== Results ===
Main Card
Weight class				Method	Round	Time	Notes
Featherweight	Kamuela Kirk	def.	Daniel Swain	TKO (retirement)	2	5:00
Bantamweight	Ricardo Dias	def.	George Garcia	KO (knee)	2	0:25
Bantamweight	Allan Begosso	def.	Samarbek Sabyrzhan Uulu	Submission (guillotine choke)	1	4:23
Heavyweight	Jordan Heiderman	def.	Anthony Garrett	Submission (arm-triangle choke)	1	3:40
Lightweight	James Wilson	def.	Daniel Jefferson	Decision (unanimous)	3	5:00
Women's Flyweight	Taylor Mauldin	def.	Ambar De La Herran	Submission (kneebar)	1	1:30
Preliminary Card
Welterweight	Ray Waters	def.	L.J. Portée	Submission (rear-naked choke)	1	1:02
Welterweight	Corey Davis	def.	Thomas Powell	TKO (head kick)	2	2:50
Women's Strawweight	Alandria Brown	def.	Shania Arredondo	Submission (rear-naked choke)	3	3:54

== Legacy Fighting Alliance 108: Fremd vs. Rodrigues ==
Legacy Fighting Alliance 108: Fremd vs. Rodrigues
- Promotion: Legacy Fighting Alliance
- Date: May 21, 2021
- Venue: Sanford Pentagon
- City: Sioux Falls, South Dakota, U.S.

Event chronology
Legacy Fighting Alliance 107: Kirk vs. Swain	Legacy Fighting Alliance 108: Fremd vs. Rodrigues

Legacy Fighting Alliance 108: Fremd vs. Rodrigues is the hundredth-ninth event of Legacy Fighting Alliance and took place on May 21, 2021. It aired on UFC Fight Pass.

=== Background ===
The main event featured a middleweight title fight between two of the most exciting knockout artists in the division. Josh Fremd (7-1) and Gregory Rodrigues (8-3) both earned their shot at the LFA Middleweight Championship by advancing to the finale of the LFA Middleweight Tournament, which began in January.

At weigh-ins, Clayton Carpenter came in at 128.6 pounds, 2.6 pounds over the non-championship flyweight limit. Therefore, the fight continued at catchweight and he was fined a percentage of his purse.

=== Results ===
Main Card
Weight class				Method	Round	Time	Notes
Middleweight	Gregory Rodrigues	def.	Josh Fremd	KO (punches)	1	2:20	(Note: For the vacant LFA Middleweight Championship.)
Flyweight	Mark Climaco	def.	Rodney Kealohi	Decision (unanimous)	3	5:00
Welterweight	Tyler Ray	def.	Ernesto Ancona	Decision (unanimous)	3	5:00
Women's Strawweight	Kathryn Paprocki	def.	Tiani Valle	Technical Submission (rear-naked choke)	3	4:01
Catchweight (128.6 lbs)	Clayton Carpenter	def.	Nick Clem	Submission (kneebar)	1	0:45
Bantamweight	Bryce Meredith	def.	Steven Merrill	TKO (punches)	1	3:35
Preliminary Card
Welterweight	Kenan Jackson	def.	Blayne Richards	Decision (unanimous)	3	5:00
Heavyweight	Bailey Schoenfelder	def.	James Munoz	TKO (punches)	1	0:20
Welterweight	Archie Colgan	def.	Keith Phathaem	Submission (arm-triangle choke)	1	4:53
Amateur Bouts
Middleweight	Jeff Nielsen	def.	C.J. Hays	TKO (punches)	2	2:39
Women's Bantamweight	Eva Brundage	def.	Cheyanne Bowers	Decision (unanimous)	3	5:00
Catchweight (140 lbs)	Colten Larson	def.	Thomas Vievering	TKO (punches)	2	1:23

== Legacy Fighting Alliance 109: McKinney vs. Irizarry ==
Legacy Fighting Alliance 109: McKinney vs. Irizarry
- Promotion: Legacy Fighting Alliance
- Date: June 5, 2021
- Venue: Grand Hotel Casino & Resort
- City: Shawnee, Oklahoma, U.S.

Event chronology
Legacy Fighting Alliance 108: Fremd vs. Rodrigues	Legacy Fighting Alliance 109: McKinney vs. Irizarry

Legacy Fighting Alliance 109: McKinney vs. Irizarry is the hundredth-tenth event of Legacy Fighting Alliance and took place on June 5, 2021. It aired on UFC Fight Pass.

=== Background ===
Terrance McKinney, coming off a knockout win at LFA 107, is looking to solidify himself at the top of the lightweight division. He will face top Puerto Rican prospect Michael Irizarry in the main event of LFA 109.

=== Results ===
Main Card
Weight class				Method	Round	Time	Notes
Lightweight	Terrance McKinney	def.	Michael Irizarry Ortiz	KO (punches)	1	1:12
Bantamweight	Justin Wetzell	def.	Askar Askar	TKO (punches)	2	2:21
Featherweight	Edwin Cooper Jr.	def.	Robson Junior	TKO (punches)	2	1:31
Women's Flyweight	Ky Bennett	def.	Gerrica Trias	Decision (unanimous)	3	5:00
Lightweight	Jacobi Jones	def.	Caleb Hall	Decision (unanimous)	3	5:00
Flyweight	Kevin Fernandez	def.	Manuel Medina	Decision (unanimous)	3	5:00
Preliminary Card
Welterweight	Haris Talundžić	def.	Gabriel Gideon	Submission (rear-naked choke)	1	1:05
Heavyweight	Luis Schwenke	def.	Ingrid Sewa	Decision (unanimous)	3	5:00

== Legacy Fighting Alliance 110: Johnson vs. Horiuchi ==
Legacy Fighting Alliance 110: Johnson vs. Horiuchi
- Promotion: Legacy Fighting Alliance
- Date: July 2, 2021
- Venue: Grand Hotel Casino & Resort
- City: Shawnee, Oklahoma, U.S.

Event chronology
Legacy Fighting Alliance 109: McKinney vs. Irizarry	Legacy Fighting Alliance 110: Johnson vs. Horiuchi

Legacy Fighting Alliance 110: Johnson vs. Horiuchi is the hundredth-eleventh event of Legacy Fighting Alliance and took place on July 2, 2021. It aired on UFC Fight Pass.

=== Background ===
The main event will feature a LFA Light Heavyweight Championship title fight between top undefeated prospect Joshua Silveira and regional kingpin Jesse "Hollywood" Murray. The co-main event will also feature a title fight when top contenders Charles "Inner G" Johnson and Yuma Horiuchi vie for interim LFA Flyweight Championship. On June 29, Silveira vs. Murray was postponed to a later date and the Flyweight Interim title bout was promoted to the main event.

=== Results ===
Main Card
Weight class				Method	Round	Time	Notes
Flyweight	Charles Johnson	def.	Yuma Horiuchi	Decision (split)	5	5:00	(Note: For the interim LFA Flyweight Championship.)
Middleweight	Hemerson Souza	def.	Chibwikem Onyenegecha	Decision (split)	3	5:00
Flyweight	Christian Natividad	def.	Luis Aguirre	Decision (unanimous)	3	5:00
Women's Strawweight	Jaqueline Amorim	def.	Megan Owen	KO (punches)	1	0:10
Flyweight	Oscar Herrera	def.	Arpan Gurung	Submission (armbar)	2	3:17

== Legacy Fighting Alliance 111: De Sa vs. Bonfim ==
Legacy Fighting Alliance 111: De Sa vs. Bonfim
- Promotion: Legacy Fighting Alliance
- Date: July 16, 2021
- Venue: Upper Arena
- City: Rio de Janeiro, Brazil

Legacy Fighting Alliance 111: De Sa vs. Bonfim is the hundredth-twelfth event of Legacy Fighting Alliance and took place on July 16, 2021. It aired on UFC Fight Pass.

=== Background ===
The event was headlined by a lightweight bout between Rangel De Sa and Ismael Bonfim.

=== Results ===
Main Card
Weight class				Method	Round	Time	Notes
Lightweight	Ismael Bonfim	def.	Rangel De Sa	Decision (unanimous)	3	5:00
Bantamweight	Marcos Breno	def.	Ary Farias	KO (punch)	1	0:56
Lightweight	Rodrigo Lidio	def.	Arthur Lima	KO (punch)	2	0:23
Light Heavyweight	Rodolfo Bellato	def.	Carlos Eduardo	Submission (rear-naked choke)	1	3:05
Lightweight	Luan Sardinha	def.	Kauê Fernandes	Decision (unanimous)	3	5:00
Women's Strawweight	Yasmin Castanho	def.	Maristela Alves	Submission (armbar)	1	4:20
Heavyweight	Eduardo Neves	def.	Eduardo Silva	TKO (punches)	1	0:57
Preliminary Card
Women's Strawweight	Stephanie Luciano	def.	Michelle Oliveira	Decision (split)	3	5:00
Middleweight	Lucas Fernando	def.	João Dantas	KO (flying knee)	1	2:23
Bantamweight	Luan Lacerda	def.	Tayron Pedro	Submission (heel hook)	2	1:06
Women's Bantamweight	Gabriella Hermogenes	def.	Queila Braga	Decision (unanimous)	3	5:00

== Legacy Fighting Alliance 112: Welterweight Tournament ==
Legacy Fighting Alliance 112: Welterweight Tournament
- Promotion: Legacy Fighting Alliance
- Date: July 19, 2021
- Venue: Upper Arena
- City: Rio de Janeiro, Brazil

Legacy Fighting Alliance 112: Welterweight Tournament is the hundredth-thirteenth event of Legacy Fighting Alliance and took place on July 19, 2021. It aired on UFC Fight Pass.

=== Background ===
The event featured a welterweight tournament, held to determine the new LFA champion. Gabriel Bonfim met Brenner Alberth in the first semifinal bout, while Diego Dias met Carlos Leal in the second semifinal bout.

=== Results ===
Main Card
Weight class				Method	Round	Time	Notes
Welterweight	Carlos Leal	def.	Uyran Carlos	Decision (unanimous)	3	5:00	(Note: Welterweight Tournament Finals for the vacant LFA Welterweight Championship)
Featherweight	Otto Rodrigues	def.	Carlos Augusto da Silva	Decision (unanimous)	3	5:00
Flyweight	Rafael Ramos	def.	Felipe Esteves	TKO (punches)	2	2:19
Lightweight	Kaynan Kruschewsky	def.	Junior Luiz	KO (punch)	1	1:02
Catchweight (139 lbs)	Carlos Mota	def.	Jefferson Oliveira	Decision (unanimous)	3	5:00
Women's Strawweight	Dayane de Souza	def.	Elaine Lopes	Submission (rear-naked choke)	1	3:45
Welterweight	Carlos Leal	def.	Diego Dias	KO (punch)	1	1:39	(Note: Welterweight Tournament Semi-Final)
Welterweight	Gabriel Bonfim	def.	Brenner Alberth	KO (punches)	3	0:38	(Note: Welterweight Tournament Semi-Final)
Preliminary Card
Welterweight	Quemuel Ottoni	def.	Junior Marques	Decision (unanimous)	3	3:00	(Note: Welterweight Tournament Semi-Final Alternate Bout)
Welterweight	Wendell Giacomo	def.	Uryan Carlos	Decision (unanimous)	3	3:00	(Note: Welterweight Tournament Semi-Final Alternate Bout)
Featherweight	Gabriel Braga	def.	Jhonatan Cordeiro	TKO (knee and punches)	2	2:54
Women's Flyweight	Brena Cardozzo	def.	Vania Caceres	Decision (unanimous)	3	5:00

== Legacy Fighting Alliance 113: Lewis vs. Petersen ==
Legacy Fighting Alliance 113: Lewis vs. Petersen
- Promotion: Legacy Fighting Alliance
- Date: July 30, 2021
- Venue: Bell County Expo Center
- City: Belton, Texas, United States

Legacy Fighting Alliance 113: Lewis vs. Petersen is the hundredth-fourteenth event of Legacy Fighting Alliance and took place on July 30, 2021. It aired on UFC Fight Pass.

=== Background ===
The event was headlined by a heavyweight bout between Thomas Petersen and Vernon Lewis for the vacant LFA Heavyweight Championship.

=== Results ===
Main Card
Weight class				Method	Round	Time	Notes
Heavyweight	Thomas Petersen	def.	Vernon Lewis	TKO (punches)	1	1:02	(Note: For the vacant LFA Heavyweight Championship)
Bantamweight	Ricky Camp	def.	Greg Fischer	Decision (split)	3	5:00
Welterweight	Chris Brown	def.	Gláucio Eliziário	TKO (slam)	2	4:59
Flyweight	Alden Coria	def.	Donnie Ballou	Submission (guillotine choke)	1	3:35
Women's Strawweight	Giovanna Canuto	def.	Kathy Solorzano	Submission (heel hook)	1	2:10
Bantamweight	Cezly Collard	def.	Patrick Ferguson	Submission (triangle choke)	1	0:44
Amateur Bouts
Lightweight	Keith Smith	def.	Jettre Hampton	TKO (punches)	1	1:35

== Legacy Fighting Alliance 114: Souza vs. Garcia ==
Legacy Fighting Alliance 114: Souza vs. Garcia
- Promotion: Legacy Fighting Alliance
- Date: August 27, 2021
- Venue: The Factory
- City: St. Louis, Missouri, United States

Legacy Fighting Alliance 114: Souza vs. Garcia is the hundredth-fifteenth event of Legacy Fighting Alliance and took place on August 27, 2021. It aired on UFC Fight Pass.

=== Background ===
An LFA Featherweight Championship bout for the vacant title between Bruno Souza and Javier Garcia headlined the event.

=== Results ===
Main Card
Weight class				Method	Round	Time	Notes
Featherweight	Bruno Souza	def.	Javier Garcia	Decision (unanimous)	5	5:00	(Note: For the vacant LFA Featherweight Championship)
Flyweight	Charles Johnson (c)	def.	João Camilo	TKO (punches)	2	4:07	(Note: For the interim LFA Flyweight Championship.)
Heavyweight	Jimmy Lawson	def.	Anthony Garrett	KO (punches)	1	0:18
Catchweight (200 lbs)	Joseph Holmes	def.	DeWayne Diggs	Submission (rear-naked choke)	2	2:48
Welterweight	Benjamin Bennett	def.	Elmar Umarov	TKO (punches)	2	0:58
Catchweight (162.5 lbs)	William Starks	def.	Irfan Mulbinovic	Submission (rear-naked choke)	2	4:16
Preliminary Bouts
Welterweight	Raheam Forest	def.	Colin Parr	KO (punch)	1	1:31
Flyweight	Dan Moriarty	def.	Joey Scanlan	TKO (punches)	1	3:20
Bantamweight	Ira Lukowsky	def.	Alex Macias	TKO (punches)	1	2:32
Amateur Bouts
Featherweight	Aaron Lake	def.	Josh Sutherlin	TKO (punches)	1	2:09
Light Heavyweight	Mervin Miller	def.	Terry Copling	Decision (split)	3	5:00
Bantamweight	Justin Richter	def.	Kris Lorenzo	Decision (unanimous)	3	5:00
Lightweight	Bill Smith	def.	Kendall Whited	Submission (armbar)	1	2:29

== Legacy Fighting Alliance 115: Silveira vs. Cummins ==
Legacy Fighting Alliance 115: Silveira vs. Cummins
- Promotion: Legacy Fighting Alliance
- Date: September 24, 2021
- Venue: Oshkosh Arena
- City: Oshkosh, Wisconsin, United States

Legacy Fighting Alliance 115: Silveira vs. Cummins is the hundredth-fifteenth event of Legacy Fighting Alliance and took place on September 24, 2021. It aired on UFC Fight Pass.

=== Results ===
Main Card
Weight class				Method	Round	Time	Notes
Light Heavyweight	Josh Silveira	def.	Tee Cummins	KO (head kick)	1	0:49	(Note: For the vacant LFA Light Heavyweight Championship)
Heavyweight	Jordan Heiderman	def.	Chad Johnson	Disqualification (illegal kick)	1	0:25
Lightweight	Lucas Clay	def.	Jake Kozorosky	Submission (brabo choke)	2	3:11
Featherweight	Edwin Cooper Jr.	def.	Andrew D Johnson	Decision (unanimous)	3	5:00
Middleweight	Roland Dunlap	def.	Ryot Waller	Decision (unanimous)	3	5:00
Flyweight	Miguel Sanson	def.	Braden Pagaoa	Decision (unanimous)	3	5:00
Preliminary Bouts
Bantamweight	Zachary Vaci	def.	Reshal Malik	KO/TKO	1	2:41
Bantamweight	Quang Le	def.	Kyles Vang	Decision (unanimous)	3	5:00
Amateur Bouts
Middleweight	Jackson McVey	def.	Dylan Diebitz	Decision (unanimous)	3	5:00
Featherweight	Anteze Howard	def.	Andy Foss	Decision (unanimous)	3	5:00
Welterweight	Aleksander Keca	def.	Herbert Rogers-Williams	Decision (unanimous)	3	5:00

== Legacy Fighting Alliance 116: Fremd vs. Valente ==
Legacy Fighting Alliance 116: Fremd vs. Valente
- Promotion: Legacy Fighting Alliance
- Date: October 22, 2021
- Venue: Dobson Arena
- City: Vail, Colorado, United States

Legacy Fighting Alliance 116: Fremd vs. Valente is the hundredth-sixteenth event of Legacy Fighting Alliance and took place on October 22, 2021. It aired on UFC Fight Pass.

=== Background ===
The event was headlined by a middleweight bout between Josh Fremd and Renato Valente.

=== Results ===
Main Card
Weight class				Method	Round	Time	Notes
Middleweight	Josh Fremd	def.	Renato Valente	Decision (unanimous)	3	5:00
Catchweight (139 lbs)	Daniel Argueta	def.	Rodney Mondala	Submission (armbar)	1	3:32	(Note: Originally a bantamweight bout; Argueta missed weight)
Featherweight	Michael Stack	def.	Jackson Filho	Decision (unanimous)	3	5:00
Women's Strawweight	Marnic Mann	def.	Pauline Macias	Submission (triangle choke)	3	3:57
Welterweight	Haris Talundžić	def.	Brock Smith	Submission (rear-naked choke)	2	1:57
Lightweight	Jacobi Jones	def.	Logan Paxton	Decision (unanimous)	3	5:00
Flyweight	Josiah Reyes	def.	Llorrvic Acevedo	KO (punches)	1	4:45
Preliminary Bouts
Women's Flyweight	Helen Lucero	def.	Jena Bishop	Submission (rear-naked choke)	1	3:38
Women's Strawweight	Kelsey Arnesen	def.	Brittany Camozzi	TKO (punches)	3	3:32
Amateur Bouts
Featherweight	Jota Ninomiya	def.	Jovan Gasper	Submission (guillotine choke)	1	0:42
Featherweight	Isaiah Diggs	def.	Gabe Parrot	TKO (punches)	1	1:22
Bantamweight	Luis Gurule	def.	DeMarcus Patterson	TKO (punches)	1	1:45
Catchweight (165 lbs)	David Evenson	def.	Bryant Ireland	TKO (punches)	1	0:09

== Legacy Fighting Alliance 117: Dias vs. Tanaka ==
Legacy Fighting Alliance 117: Dias vs. Tanak
- Promotion: Legacy Fighting Alliance
- Date: November 5, 2021
- Venue: Visalia Convention Center
- City: Visalia, California, United States

Legacy Fighting Alliance 117: Dias vs. Tanaka is the hundredth-seventeenth event of Legacy Fighting Alliance and took place on November 5, 2021. It aired on UFC Fight Pass.

=== Results ===
Main Card
Weight class				Method	Round	Time	Notes
Bantamweight	Michinori Tanaka	def.	Ricardo Dias	Decision (unanimous)	3	5:00
Flyweight	Yuma Horiuchi	def.	Mark Climaco	KO (punch)	1	1:52
Catchweight (160 lb)	Batsumberel Dagvadorj	def.	Emilio Williams	TKO (punches)	1	2:19
Featherweight	Hyder Amil	def.	Robson Junior	TKO (punches)	2	3:26
Catchweight (175 lb)	Jeffrey Craig	def.	Christian Avalos	Decision (unanimous)	3	5:00
Preliminary Bouts
Catchweight (175 lb)	Albert Gonzales	def.	Dominic Sumner	KO (punch)	1	0:39
Amateur Bouts
Catchweight (130 lb)	Marcelino Silva	def.	Liovardo Garfias	Submission (keylock)	1	1:37
Lightweight	Scott Hokit	def.	Raul Mendoza	Decision (unanimous)	3	3:00
Welterweight	Ramon Juarez	def.	Xavier Chavez	Decision (unanimous)	3	3:00

== Legacy Fighting Alliance 118: Askar vs. Gomes ==
Legacy Fighting Alliance 118: Askar vs. Gomes
- Promotion: Legacy Fighting Alliance
- Date: November 12, 2021
- Venue: Los Angeles-Burbank Marriott Convention Center
- City: Burbank, California, United States

Legacy Fighting Alliance 118: Askar vs. Gomes is the hundredth-eighteenth event of Legacy Fighting Alliance and took place on November 12, 2021. It aired on UFC Fight Pass.

=== Results ===
Main Card
Weight class				Method	Round	Time	Notes
Bantamweight	Askar Askar	def.	Leandro Gomes	Decision (split)	3	5:00
Featherweight	Javier Garcia	def.	Ryan Fillingame	Decision (unanimous)	3	5:00
Women's Flyweight	Jena Bishop	def.	Dione Barbosa	Decision (unanimous)	3	5:00
Catchweight (140 lb)	Rickey Furar	def.	Jose Avalos	Submission (rear-naked choke)	1	1:30
Women's Strawweight	Sidney Trillo	def.	Alandria Brown	TKO (punches)	3	2:49
Women's Flyweight	Taylor Mauldin	def.	Nadine Mandiau	Decision (unanimous)	3	5:00
Preliminary Bouts
Bantamweight	Joseph Dorado	def.	Corvan Allen	Submission (rear-naked choke)	3	3:17

== Legacy Fighting Alliance 119: Silveira vs. Revel ==
Legacy Fighting Alliance 119: Silveira vs. Revel
- Promotion: Legacy Fighting Alliance
- Date: December 3, 2021
- Venue: Arizona Federal Theatre
- City: Phoenix, Arizona, United States

Legacy Fighting Alliance 119: Silveira vs. Revel was the hundredth-ninenth event of Legacy Fighting Alliance and took place on December 3, 2021. It aired on UFC Fight Pass.

=== Background ===
The event was headlined by a LFA Middleweight Championship bout for the vacant title between Josh Silveira and Jared Revel.

=== Results ===
Main Card
Weight class				Method	Round	Time	Notes
Middleweight	Josh Silveira	def.	Jared Revel	Decision (unanimous) (50–45, 50–45, 50–45)	5	5:00	(Note: For the vacant LFA Middleweight Championship)
Bantamweight	Richard Palencia	def.	Allan Begosso	Decision (unanimous) (48–47, 48–47, 48–47)	5	5:00	(Note: For the vacant LFA Bantamweight Championship)
Flyweight	Clayton Carpenter	def.	Rodney Kealohi	KO (head kick)	1	0:13
Featherweight	Dorian Ramos	def.	Isaac Thomson	TKO (punches and elbows)	2	2:27
Lightweight	Austin Wourms	def.	Chris Renteria	Submission (armbar)	1	1:01
Preliminary Bouts
Welterweight	Ray Waters	def.	Ovidio Bojorquez	TKO (strikes)	1	4:43
Featherweight	Moses Diaz	def.	Johnson Nasona	TKO (punches)	1	4:21
Middleweight	Eric Fimbres	def.	Osama Awadalla	TKO (punches)	1	0:48
Catchweight (160 lb)	Cedric Katambwa	def.	Ray Osborn	Decision (unanimous) (30–27, 30–27, 30–27)	3	5:00
Amateur Bouts
Women's Strawweight	Quinn Williams	def.	Elizabeth Torres Marquez	Submission (rear-naked choke)	1	1:07

== Legacy Fighting Alliance 120: Cantuária vs. Horth ==
Legacy Fighting Alliance 120: Cantuária vs. Horth
- Promotion: Legacy Fighting Alliance
- Date: December 10, 2021
- Venue: Mystic Lake Casino Hotel
- City: Prior Lake, Minnesota, United States

Legacy Fighting Alliance 120: Cantuária vs. Horth was the hundredth-tenth event of Legacy Fighting Alliance and took place on December 10, 2021. It aired on UFC Fight Pass.

=== Background ===
The event was headlined by a LFA Women's Flyweight Championship bout for the vacant title between Jamey-Lyn Horth Wessels and Mayra Cantuária.

=== Results ===
Main Card
Weight class				Method	Round	Time	Notes
Women's Flyweight	Jamey-Lyn Horth Wessels	def.	Mayra Cantuária	Submission (rear-naked choke)	3	1:50	(Note: For the LFA Women's Flyweight Championship.)
Middleweight	Bruno Assis	def.	Jalin Fuller	Decision (unanimous)	3	5:00
Flyweight	Tony Laramie	def.	Tyus White	Decision (unanimous)	3	5:00
Heavyweight	Daiqkwon Buckley	def.	Royce White	Decision (unanimous)	3	5:00
Featherweight	Felipe Martinez Donis	def.	Henry Huff	Decision (unanimous)	3	5:00
Middleweight	Billy Elekana	def.	Jeff Nielsen	Decision (unanimous)	3	5:00
Preliminary Bouts
Flyweight	Miguel Sanson	def.	Sean Stebbins	Decision (split)	3	5:00
Bantamweight	Mitchell McKee	def.	Frank Posko	TKO (punches)	2	0:28
Catchweight (140 lb)	Quang Le	def.	Austin Robinson	Submission (rear-naked choke)	1	1:12
Lightweight	Dylan Willey	def.	Coty Milhausen	Submission (armbar)	1	3:44
Amateur Bouts
Bantamweight	Santos Verdinez	def.	Pedro Lopez	Submission (guilline choke)	1	1:00
Welterweight	C.J. Hays	def.	Jason Alvarez	TKO (punches)	2	1:52
Catchweight (165 lb)	Joey Hart	def.	Dalton Albrent	Decision (unanimous)	3	3:00
Middleweight	Jackson McVey	def.	Seth Swinehart	Submission (triangle choke)	2	1:00
Featherweight	Anteze Howard	def.	Gunner Charbonneau	Submission (triangle choke)	2	1:30
Lightweight	Mitchell Wilson	def.	Hayden Frym	Decision (split)	3	3:00
Welterweight	Bodie Fitzsimonds	def.	Andrew Wilson	Decision (unanimous)	3	3:00
Bantamweight	Sam Norris	def.	Lad Fisk	Decision (split)	3	3:00

== See also ==
- 2021 in UFC
- 2021 in Bellator
- 2021 in ONE Championship
- 2021 in Rizin Fighting Federation
- 2021 in Konfrontacja Sztuk Walki
- 2021 in Absolute Championship Akhmat
- 2021 in Brave Combat Federation
- 2021 in Fight Nights Global
