= Polyana Viana =

Brazilian mixed martial artist

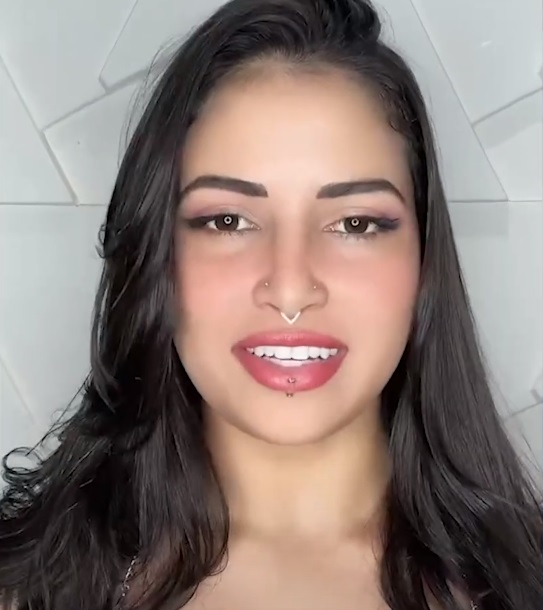
- Polyana Viana in 2023.
- Born: Polyanna Viana Mota; June 14, 1992 (age 34); Sao Geraldo do Araguaia, Pará, Brazil
- Other names: Dama de Ferro (Iron Lady)
- Height: 5 ft 5 in (1.65 m)
- Weight: 116 lb (53 kg; 8.3 st)
- Division: Strawweight
- Reach: 67 in (170 cm)
- Fighting out of: Sao Geraldo do Araguaia, Brazil
- Team: TATA Fight Team (2017–present)
- Rank: Black belt in Brazilian Jiu-Jitsu
- Years active: 2013–present

Mixed martial arts record
- Total: 22
- Wins: 13
- By knockout: 5
- By submission: 8
- Losses: 9
- By knockout: 1
- By submission: 4
- By decision: 4

Other information
- Mixed martial arts record from Sherdog

Polyana Viana Mota (born 14 June 1992) is a Brazilian professional mixed martial artist who currently competes in the women's Strawweight division of the Ultimate Fighting Championship (UFC).

== Background ==
Raised solely by her mother, Viana grew up in São Geraldo do Araguaia, a small town in the Pará region of Brazil. She started training Brazilian Jiu-Jitsu in 2013 and also made her professional mixed martial arts debut in late 2013.

== Mixed martial arts career ==
=== Ultimate Fighting Championship ===
Viana made her UFC debut at UFC Fight Night 125 on February 3, 2018 against Maia Stevenson. She won the fight via rear-naked choke in the first round.

In May 2018 it was announced that Viana would be fighting against JJ Aldrich on UFC 227 in August. Viana would lose the fight via unanimous decision as Aldrich out-boxed her most of the fight.

She next took on Hannah Cifers at UFC 235, a fight she went on to lose by split decision.

Viana took on Veronica Macedo at UFC Fight Night 156. The bout had originally been scheduled between Macedo and Rachael Ostovich, however on July 29 it was announced that Ostovich would be replaced by Viana for an undisclosed reason. As expected, the fight took place on the ground, but surprisingly Macedo submitted Viana via armbar, a submission Viana herself has finished 6 fights with in her career, as of May 2022. The result was Macedo's first UFC win and the first time in Viana's career she had ever been submitted in a fight.

Viana was scheduled to face Emily Whitmire on March 8, 2020, at UFC 248. At the weigh-ins, Whitmire weighed in at 117.5 pounds, 1.5 pounds over the strawweight non-title fight limit of 116. She was fined 20% of her purse and her bout with Viana was expected to proceed as scheduled at a catchweight. Subsequently, Whitmire was hospitalized the day of the event and the fight was cancelled. The pair was rescheduled on August 29, 2020, at UFC Fight Night 175 in a flyweight bout. Viana won the fight via an armbar submission in round one.

Viana faced Mallory Martin on February 13, 2021, at UFC 258. She won the fight via an armbar in round one. This win earned her the Performance of the Night award.

Viana faced Tabatha Ricci on May 21, 2022 at UFC Fight Night 206. She lost the fight via unanimous decision.

Viana faced Jinh Yu Frey on November 5, 2022 at UFC Fight Night 214. She won the fight via knockout in the first round. This win earned her the Performance of the Night award.

Viana was scheduled to face Emily Ducote on April 29, 2023, at UFC on ESPN 45. However, the bout was rescheduled for UFC Fight Night 223 on May 20, 2023. In turn, Viana withdrew from the bout due to undisclosed reason and was replaced by former LFA Women's Strawweight Champion Lupita Godinez at a catchweight of 120 pounds.

Viana faced Iasmin Lucindo on August 12, 2023, at UFC on ESPN 51. She lost the fight via arm-triangle choke in round two.

Viana faced Gillian Robertson on January 20, 2024, at UFC 297. She lost the fight via technical knockout in round two.

Viana was scheduled to face Cory McKenna on October 12, 2024 at UFC Fight Night 244. However, Viana withdrew from the fight for unknown reasons and was replaced by Julia Polastri.

Viana faced Jaqueline Amorim on April 26, 2025 at UFC on ESPN 66. She lost the fight via a rear-naked choke submission in the second round.

Viana faced Alice Ardelean on May 16, 2026 at UFC Fight Night 276. She lost the fight via a capsule lock submission in the second round.

== Personal life ==
Viana has a son.

=== Attempted robbery ===
In January 2019, a man attempted to rob Viana using a fake gun as she waited outside her apartment. Viana punched the man and subdued him until the police arrived. Viana did not face charges as the authorities ruled it was self-defense.

== Championships and accomplishments ==
- Ultimate Fighting Championship
  - Performance of the Night (Two times) vs. Mallory Martin, and Jinh Yu Frey
  - Tied (Tatiana Suarez, Jaqueline Amorim & Zhang Weili) for sixth most finishes in UFC Women's Strawweight division history (4)
  - Tied (Rose Namajunas, Cynthia Calvillo, Virna Jandiroba & Jaqueline Amorim) for third most submissions in UFC Women's Strawweight division history (3)
  - Tied (Cynthia Calvillo) for second most submission attempts in UFC Women's Strawweight division history (9)
- Jungle Fight
  - Jungle Fight Strawweight Championship (One time)
    - One successful title defence

== Mixed martial arts record ==
Professional record breakdown
22 matches	13 wins	9 losses
By knockout	5	1
By submission	8	4
By decision	0	4

Res.	Record	Opponent	Method	Event	Date	Round	Time	Location	Notes
Loss	13–9	Alice Ardelean	Submission (capsule lock)	UFC Fight Night: Allen vs. Costa	May 16, 2026	2	4:36	Las Vegas, Nevada, United States	
Loss	13–8	Jaqueline Amorim	Submission (rear-naked choke)	UFC on ESPN: Machado Garry vs. Prates	April 26, 2025	2	1:49	Kansas City, Missouri, United States	
Loss	13–7	Gillian Robertson	TKO (punches)	UFC 297	January 20, 2024	2	3:12	Toronto, Ontario, Canada	
Loss	13–6	Iasmin Lucindo	Submission (arm-triangle choke)	UFC on ESPN: Luque vs. dos Anjos	August 12, 2023	2	3:42	Las Vegas, Nevada, United States	
Win	13–5	Jinh Yu Frey	KO (punches)	UFC Fight Night: Rodriguez vs. Lemos	November 5, 2022	1	0:47	Las Vegas, Nevada, United States	Performance of the Night.
Loss	12–5	Tabatha Ricci	Decision (unanimous)	UFC Fight Night: Holm vs. Vieira	May 21, 2022	3	5:00	Las Vegas, Nevada, United States	
Win	12–4	Mallory Martin	Submission (armbar)	UFC 258	February 13, 2021	1	3:18	Las Vegas, Nevada, United States	Performance of the Night.
Win	11–4	Emily Whitmire	Submission (armbar)	UFC Fight Night: Smith vs. Rakić	August 29, 2020	1	1:53	Las Vegas, Nevada, United States	
Loss	10–4	Veronica Macedo	Submission (armbar)	UFC Fight Night: Shevchenko vs. Carmouche 2	August 10, 2019	1	1:09	Montevideo, Uruguay	Flyweight bout.
Loss	10–3	Hannah Cifers	Decision (split)	UFC 235	March 2, 2019	3	5:00	Las Vegas, Nevada, United States	
Loss	10–2	JJ Aldrich	Decision (unanimous)	UFC 227	August 4, 2018	3	5:00	Los Angeles, California, United States	
Win	10–1	Maia Stevenson	Submission (rear-naked choke)	UFC Fight Night: Machida vs. Anders	February 3, 2018	1	3:50	Belém, Brazil	
Win	9–1	Pamela Rosa	Submission (armbar)	Watch Out Combat Show 47	October 7, 2017	1	1:56	Rio de Janeiro, Brazil	
Win	8–1	Débora Dias Nascimento	Submission (armbar)	Jungle Fight 87	May 21, 2016	1	3:23	São Paulo, Brazil	Defended the Jungle Fight Strawweight Championship.
Win	7–1	Amanda Ribas	KO (punches)	Jungle Fight 83	November 28, 2015	1	2:54	Rio de Janeiro, Brazil	Won the vacant Jungle Fight Strawweight Championship.
Win	6–1	Karol Pereira Silva Cerqueira	Submission (rear-naked choke)	Jungle Fight 81	September 12, 2015	1	2:24	Palmas, Brazil	Return to Strawweight.
Win	5–1	Giselle Campos	Submission (armbar)	Maraba Combat-1.0	July 18, 2015	1	1:31	Marabá, Brazil	Flyweight bout.
Loss	4–1	Aline Sattelmayer	Decision (unanimous)	Real Fight 12	December 14, 2014	3	5:00	São José dos Campos, Brazil	Strawweight bout.
Win	4–0	Débora Silva	TKO (punches)	Talento Uruará Fight	June 7, 2014	1	1:09	Uruará, Brazil	
Win	3–0	Thais Santana	TKO (punches)	Araguatins Fight Night MMA	April 12, 2014	?	NA	Araguatins, Brazil	
Win	2–0	Mirelle Oliveira do Nascimento	Submission (armbar)	Piaui Fight MMA 2	February 8, 2014	2	1:20	Teresina, Brazil	
Win	1–0	Silvana Pinto	TKO (doctor stoppage)	Demolidor Extreme Combat 3	December 14, 2013	1	1:48	Marabá, Brazil	
