= Cortney Casey =

American mixed martial arts fighter

- Born: May 5, 1987 (age 39); Mesa, Arizona, U.S.
- Other names: Cast Iron
- Height: 5 ft 6 in (1.68 m)
- Weight: 115 lb (52 kg; 8.2 st)
- Division: Strawweight; Flyweight
- Reach: 67 in (170 cm)
- Rank: Brown belt in Brazilian Jiu-Jitsu
- Years active: 2012–present

Mixed martial arts record
- Total: 20
- Wins: 10
- By knockout: 3
- By submission: 4
- By decision: 3
- Losses: 10
- By submission: 2
- By decision: 8

Other information
- University: University of Texas at El Paso
- Mixed martial arts record from Sherdog

Cortney Casey (born 5 May 1987) is an American mixed martial artist who competed in the Strawweight and Flyweight divisions of the Ultimate Fighting Championship (UFC).

== Background ==
Casey is of Mexican descent. A former Division I soccer player at the University of Texas at El Paso, Casey began training MMA in 2009 after her soccer career was cut short due to an injury. She began her amateur career in 2012, and her professional career a year later.

== Mixed martial arts career ==
=== Amateur career ===
Casey made her amateur debut in 2012, losing a split decision to future UFC Strawweight Emily Kagan. Casey then went on a four fight win streak, earning three wins by armbar and capturing the Tuff-N-Uff Flyweight title in the process and defending it once.

=== Early career ===
Casey made her professional debut in 2013 defeating Kelly Warren by rear naked choke.

Casey was then submitted by Pearl Gonzalez by armbar in her second fight.

After the loss Casey signed with the Middle Eastern promotion PXC before going on a three fight win streak, finishing all of her opponents.

=== Ultimate Fighting Championship ===
On July 18, 2015, Casey debuted in the UFC to face The Ultimate Fighter: A Champion Will Be Crowned contestant Joanne Calderwood, at UFC Fight Night: Bisping vs. Leites, replacing the injured Bec Rawlings. After winning round one, Casey was outpointed by Calderwood in the next two rounds and lost a unanimous decision. Despite the loss, she was awarded a "Fight of the Night" bonus award.

Casey next faced Seo Hee Ham at UFC Fight Night: Henderson vs. Masvidal on November 28, 2015. Again Casey lost a unanimous decision, but was awarded "Fight of the Night".

Casey faced Cristina Stanciu at UFC Fight Night: McDonald vs. Lineker on July 13, 2016. She earned her first UFC win by defeating Stanciu by TKO in the first round.

Casey next faced Randa Markos at UFC 202 on August 20, 2016. Casey caught Markos in an armbar, to which she verbally submitted, giving Casey back-to-back UFC wins.

Casey next faced Cláudia Gadelha at UFC Fight Night: Bader vs. Nogueira 2. She lost the fight by unanimous decision. During the third round there was controversy when Gadelha appeared to land an illegal head kick on Casey while Casey was grounded. However, the referee deemed the kick unintentional and no point was deducted. A replay showed that Gadelha's shin appeared not to hit Casey's skull but caught her hair instead. Casey was criticized for allegedly trying to play up the illegal head kick and possibly achieve a disqualification win.

Casey next faced Jessica Aguilar at UFC 211 on May 13, 2017. She won the fight via unanimous decision. However, the result of the fight was overturned to a No Contest and Casey was suspended for three months by the Texas Department of Licensing and Regulation after an in-competition sample provided by Casey was found to have an elevated testosterone to epi-testosterone ratio. Several experts questioned the findings and in June 2017 she was exonerated by the UFC after follow up testing showed no evidence of doping. On June 29 the UFC issued a strongly worded statement requesting that "the Texas Department of Licensing and Regulation (TDLR) immediately reverse its ruling and exonerate Cortney of any wrongdoing". In turn, on June 30, the TDLR lifted Casey's three-month suspension and reinstated her victory.

Casey faced Felice Herrig on December 2, 2017 at UFC 218. She lost the bout via split decision.

Casey fought against Michelle Waterson at UFC on Fox 29 in Glendale, AZ on April 14. Cortney lost the fight via split decision

Casey faced Angela Hill on August 25, 2018 at UFC Fight Night 135. She won the fight via split decision.

Casey next faced Cynthia Calvillo on February 17, 2019 at UFC on ESPN 1. She lost the fight by unanimous decision.

Casey was expected to face Virna Jandiroba on December 7, 2019 at UFC on ESPN 7. However, Casey withdrew from the event for an undisclosed reason and she was replaced by Lívia Renata Souza

Casey was scheduled to face Lara Procópio on May 16, 2020 at UFC Fight Night 175 (San Diego). However, on April 9, Dana White, the president of UFC announced that this event was postponed to a future date Instead Casey is scheduled to face Mara Romero Borella on May 16, 2020 at UFC on ESPN: Overeem vs. Harris. She won the bout in the first round via submission through an armbar. This win earned her the Performance of the Night award.

Casey faced Gillian Robertson on June 20, 2020 at UFC Fight Night: Blaydes vs. Volkov. She lost the fight via a rear-naked choke submission in round three.

Casey was expected to face Priscila Cachoeira on October 31, 2020 at UFC Fight Night 181. However the bout was called off the day of the weigh-ins as Cachoeira had issues cutting weight.

Casey faced JJ Aldrich on March 13, 2021 at UFC Fight Night 187. She lost the fight via split decision.

Casey was expected to face Liana Jojua on August 21, 2021 at UFC on ESPN 29. However, Jojua was forced out of the fight due to visa issues. The matchup was rescheduled at UFC Fight Night 197 on November 13, 2021. At the weigh-ins, Jojua weighed in at 128.5 pounds, two and a half pounds over the flyweight non-title fight limit. The bout proceeded at a catchweight with Jojua fined 30% of her purse, which went to her opponent Casey. Casey won the bout via unanimous decision.

Casey was scheduled to face Antonina Shevchenko on April 30, 2022 at UFC on ESPN 35. However, the bout was postponed to July 9, 2022 at UFC on ESPN 39 due Shevchenko injured her knee in training. Casey lost the fight via split decision.

Casey was scheduled to face Jasmine Jasudavicius on February 25, 2023, at UFC Fight Night 220. However, Casey withdrew from the event due to an undisclosed medical reason and was replaced by Gabriella Fernandes.

On September 14, 2023, Casey had accepted a 4–month suspension by USADA after she reported herself in June 2023 for taking the prohibited substance BPC-157 to treat a medical condition. She is able to compete again as of October 1, 2023. On September 19, 2023, it was reported that Casey was removed from UFC roster.

== Championships and accomplishments ==
=== Mixed martial arts ===
- Ultimate Fighting Championship
  - Fight of the Night (Two times) vs. Joanne Calderwood and Seo Hee Ham
  - Performance of the Night (One time) vs. Mara Romero Borella
  - Tied (Angela Hill, Jorge Masvidal, Clay Guida, Paul Felder & Andrea Lee) for most split decision losses in UFC history (4)

== Mixed martial arts record ==
Professional record breakdown
20 matches	10 wins	10 losses
By knockout	3	0
By submission	4	2
By decision	3	8

Res.	Record	Opponent	Method	Event	Date	Round	Time	Location	Notes
Loss	10–10	Antonina Shevchenko	Decision (split)	UFC on ESPN: dos Anjos vs. Fiziev	July 9, 2022	3	5:00	Las Vegas, Nevada, United States	
Win	10–9	Liana Jojua	Decision (unanimous)	UFC Fight Night: Holloway vs. Rodríguez	November 13, 2021	3	5:00	Las Vegas, Nevada, United States	Catchweight (128.5 lb) bout; Jojua missed weight.
Loss	9–9	JJ Aldrich	Decision (split)	UFC Fight Night: Edwards vs. Muhammad	March 13, 2021	3	5:00	Las Vegas, Nevada, United States	
Loss	9–8	Gillian Robertson	Submission (rear-naked choke)	UFC on ESPN: Blaydes vs. Volkov	June 20, 2020	3	4:32	Las Vegas, Nevada, United States	
Win	9–7	Mara Romero Borella	Submission (armbar)	UFC on ESPN: Overeem vs. Harris	May 16, 2020	1	3:36	Jacksonville, Florida, United States	Return to Flyweight. Performance of the Night.
Loss	8–7	Cynthia Calvillo	Decision (unanimous)	UFC on ESPN: Ngannou vs. Velasquez	February 17, 2019	3	5:00	Phoenix, Arizona, United States	
Win	8–6	Angela Hill	Decision (split)	UFC Fight Night: Gaethje vs. Vick	August 25, 2018	3	5:00	Lincoln, Nebraska, United States	
Loss	7–6	Michelle Waterson	Decision (split)	UFC on Fox: Poirier vs. Gaethje	April 14, 2018	3	5:00	Glendale, Arizona, United States	
Loss	7–5	Felice Herrig	Decision (split)	UFC 218	December 2, 2017	3	5:00	Detroit, Michigan, United States	
Win	7–4	Jessica Aguilar	Decision (unanimous)	UFC 211	May 13, 2017	3	5:00	Dallas, Texas, United States	
Loss	6–4	Cláudia Gadelha	Decision (unanimous)	UFC Fight Night: Bader vs. Nogueira 2	November 19, 2016	3	5:00	São Paulo, Brazil	
Win	6–3	Randa Markos	Submission (armbar)	UFC 202	August 20, 2016	1	4:34	Las Vegas, Nevada, United States	
Win	5–3	Cristina Stanciu	TKO (punches)	UFC Fight Night: McDonald vs. Lineker	July 13, 2016	1	2:36	Sioux Falls, South Dakota, United States	
Loss	4–3	Seo Hee Ham	Decision (unanimous)	UFC Fight Night: Henderson vs. Masvidal	November 28, 2015	3	5:00	Seoul, South Korea	Fight of the Night.
Loss	4–2	Joanne Calderwood	Decision (unanimous)	UFC Fight Night: Bisping vs. Leites	July 18, 2015	3	5:00	Glasgow, Scotland	Fight of the Night.
Win	4–1	Helen Harper	TKO (knee)	Pacific Xtreme Combat 47	March 13, 2015	1	3:42	Mangilao, Guam	
Win	3–1	Gina Iniong	Submission (rear-naked choke)	Pacific Xtreme Combat 46	November 15, 2014	1	4:49	Manila, Philippines	Catchweight (110 lb) bout.
Win	2–1	Tomo Maesawa	TKO (corner stoppage)	Pacific Xtreme Combat 44	June 27, 2014	1	0:39	Mangilao, Guam	Strawweight debut.
Loss	1–1	Pearl Gonzalez	Submission (armbar)	XFC 26: Night of Champions 3	October 18, 2013	3	4:43	Nashville, Tennessee, United States	For the vacant XFC Women's Flyweight Championship.
Win	1–0	Kelly Warren	Submission (rear-naked choke)	XFC 24: Collision Course	June 14, 2013	1	3:33	Tampa, Florida, United States	Flyweight debut.

== See also ==
- List of female mixed martial artists
