= Janaisa Morandin =

Brazilian mixed martial arts (MMA) fighter

- Born: October 31, 1994 (age 31); Erechim, Brazil
- Other names: Evil Princess
- Height: 5 ft 0 in (1.52 m)
- Weight: 115 lb (52 kg; 8 st 3 lb)
- Division: Atomweight (2014–2017) Strawweight (2013-2014, 2017-2021); Flyweight (2022-)
- Style: Boxing, BJJ
- Team: Killer Bees; Astra Fight Team
- Years active: 2013–present

Mixed martial arts record
- Total: 15
- Wins: 10
- By knockout: 5
- By submission: 1
- By decision: 4
- Losses: 5
- By knockout: 1
- By submission: 2
- By decision: 2

Other information
- Mixed martial arts record from Sherdog

Janaisa Morandin (born October 31, 1994) is a mixed martial artist (MMA) from Brazil, and competed in Invicta Fighting Championships in Strawweight division.

== Mixed martial arts career ==
=== Early career ===
Morandins started her professional MMA career in 2013 and fought primarily in Brazil. She amassed a record of 9-0 prior to being signed by Invicta.

=== Invicta Fighting Championships ===
Morandin made her Invicta debut on August 31, 2017, at Invicta FC 25: Kunitskaya vs. Pa'aluhi against Lívia Renata Souza. She lost the fight via unanimous decision.

Morandin was scheduled to face Mizuki Inoue on December 8, 2017, at Invicta FC 26: Maia vs. Niedwiedz for the Invicta strawweight championship. She won the fight via unanimous decision. However, Inoue was forced to pull out and she was replaced by Kinberly Tanaka Novaes.

On September 1, 2018, Morandin faced Virna Jandiroba at Invicta FC 31: Jandiroba vs. Morandin for the Invicta FC Strawweight Championship. She lost the fight via a submission in round two.

Morandin is scheduled to faced Emily Ducote on August 9, 2019, at Invicta FC 36: Sorenson vs. Young. She lost by first-round KO.

Morandin faced Montserrat Ruiz on July 30, 2020, at Invicta FC 41: Morandin vs. Ruiz. She lost the bout through first round scarf hold keylock submission.

Morandin faced Liana Pirosin on May 11, 2022, at Invicta FC 47. She lost the close bout via split decision.

== Championships and accomplishments ==
=== Mixed martial arts ===
- Aspera Fighting Championship
  - Aspera Fighting Championship Strawweight Champion

== Mixed martial arts record ==
Professional record breakdown
15 matches	10 wins	5 losses
By knockout	5	1
By submission	1	2
By decision	4	2

Res.	Record	Opponent	Method	Event	Date	Round	Time	Location	Notes
Loss	10–5	Liana Pirosin	Decision (split)	Invicta FC 47: Ducote vs. Zappitella	May 11, 2022	3	5:00	Kansas City, Kansas, United States	Flyweight debut.
Loss	10–4	Montserrat Ruiz	Submission (scarf hold keylock)	Invicta FC 41: Morandin vs. Ruiz	July 30, 2020	1	3:28	Kansas City, Kansas, United States	
Loss	10–3	Emily Ducote	KO (punches)	Invicta FC 36: Sorenson vs. Young	August 9, 2019	1	4:03	Kansas City, Kansas, United States	Catchweight (119 lb) bout.
Loss	10–2	Virna Jandiroba	Submission (arm-triangle choke)	Invicta FC 31: Jandiroba vs. Morandin	September 1, 2018	2	2:23	Kansas City, Missouri, United States	For the Invicta FC Strawweight Championship.
Win	10–1	Kinberly Tanaka Novaes	Decision (unanimous)	Invicta FC 26: Maia vs. Niedwiedz	December 8, 2017	3	5:00	Kansas City, Missouri, United States	
Loss	9–1	Lívia Renata Souza	Decision (unanimous)	Invicta FC 25: Kunitskaya vs. Pa'aluhi	August 31, 2017	3	5:00	Lemoore, California, United States	Strawweight debut.
Win	9–0	Paula Vieira da Silva	TKO (doctor stoppage)	Aspera FC 44	September 10, 2016	2	5:00	São Paulo, Brazil	For the vacant Aspera FC Atomweight Championship.
Win	8–0	Lavinia Ione	TKO (punches)	Aspera FC 38	May 27, 2016	2	1:50	São Paulo, Brazil	Catchweight (110 lb) bout.
Win	7–0	Arielle Souza	Decision (unanimous)	MMA Super Heroes 6	October 25, 2014	3	5:00	São Paulo, Brazil	Atomweight debut.
Win	6–0	Cynthia Candido	TKO (knees and punches)	Aspera FC 11	August 30, 2014	2	1:12	Santa Catarina, Brazil	
Win	5–0	Mariana Oliveira	TKO (punches and knees)	Aspera FC 10	August 9, 2014	1	0:16	Santa Catarina, Brazil	
Win	4–0	Ana Luiza de Jesus	Submission (rear-naked choke)	Aspera FC 7	May 25, 2014	1	0:59	Santa Catarina, Brazil	
Win	3–0	Helaine Ribeiro	Decision (split)	Aspera FC 3	February 16, 2014	3	5:00	Santa Catarina, Brazil	
Win	2–0	Thayani Cristine	TKO (retirement)	Sparta MMA 10	October 20, 2013	1	5:00	Santa Catarina, Brazil	
Win	1–0	Thayani Cristine	Decision (unanimous)	Sparta MMA 7	June 15, 2013	3	5:00	Santa Catarina, Brazil	Strawweight debut.

== See also ==
- List of female mixed martial artists
