= Lívia Renata Souza =

Brazilian mixed martial artist (born 1991)

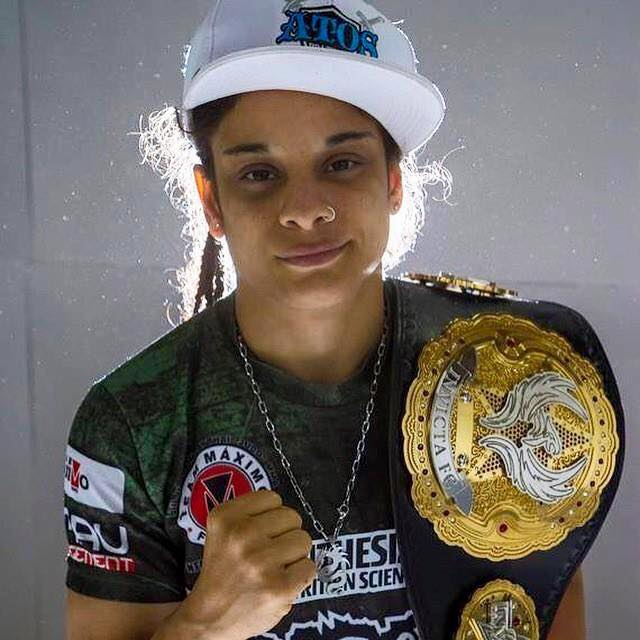
- Souza posing with the Invicta FC Strawweight Championship
- Born: Lívia Renata dos Santos Souza; March 11, 1991 (age 35); Araraquara, Sao Paulo, Brazil
- Other names: Livinha Souza; The Brazilian Gangster
- Height: 5 ft 4 in (1.63 m)
- Weight: 115 lb (52 kg; 8.2 st)
- Division: Strawweight (105–115 Ib)
- Reach: 63 in (160 cm)
- Team: Team Máximo
- Rank: Black belt in Brazilian Jiu-Jitsu under Vinicius Máximo and Kleber Máximo
- Years active: 2013–present

Mixed martial arts record
- Total: 18
- Wins: 14
- By knockout: 2
- By submission: 8
- By decision: 4
- Losses: 4
- By knockout: 1
- By decision: 3

Other information
- Mixed martial arts record from Sherdog

Lívia Renata dos Santos Souza (born March 11, 1991), also known as Livinha Souza, is a Brazilian mixed martial artist who competes in the Strawweight division. She has previously competed in the UFC and Invicta Fighting Championships, where she is a former Invicta FC Strawweight Champion.

== Mixed martial arts career ==
=== Early career ===
Souza made her professional MMA debut in March 2013. Over the next two years, she amassed an undefeated record of 7 wins and no losses.

=== Invicta FC ===
In her Invicta FC debut, Souza defeated Katja Kankaanpää to win the Strawweight title at Invicta FC 12: Kankaanpää vs. Souza. Just like fellow Brazilian and former Invicta FC Atomweight Champion Herica Tiburcio, Souza went on to win the title in her very first fight on both the promotion and outside of her native Brazil.

Souza successfully defended the title against DeAnna Bennett at Invicta FC 15: Cyborg vs. Ibragimova on January 16, 2016. She won the fight via TKO due to a combination of body kick and punches.

In her second title defense, Souza faced Angela Hill at Invicta FC 17: Evinger vs. Schneider on May 7, 2016. She lost the five round bout by split decision.

=== Ultimate Fighting Championship ===
Souza signed with the UFC in October 2017 and was scheduled to face Jessica Aguilar on February 18, 2018, at UFC Fight Night: Cowboy vs. Medeiros. However, Souza pulled out on February 10 due to a hand injury.

Souza faced Alex Chambers on September 22, 2018, at UFC Fight Night 137. She won the fight via a guillotine choke in round one.

Souza faced promotional newcomer Sarah Frota on February 2, 2019, at UFC Fight Night 144. She won the fight by split decision.

Souza was scheduled to face Carla Esparza on April 27, 2019, at UFC Fight Night: Jacaré vs. Hermansson. However, it was reported that Souza pulled out of the bout, citing ankle injury and she was replaced by current Virna Jandiroba.

Souza was scheduled to face Cynthia Calvillo on July 13, 2019, at UFC on ESPN+ 13. However, on June 7, 2019, it was reported that Calvillo was forced to pull out of the bout due to a broken foot and she was replaced by Brianna Van Buren. She lost the fight via unanimous decision.

Souza was expected to face Virna Jandiroba, replacing Cortney Casey, on December 7, 2019, at UFC on ESPN 7. In turn Souza withdrew from the bout due to back injury and she was replaced by Mallory Martin

Souza faced Ashley Yoder on August 15, 2020, at UFC 252. She won the fight via unanimous decision.

Souza was expected to face promotional newcomer Kanako Murata on November 14, 2020, at UFC Fight Night: Felder vs. dos Anjos. However, Souza pulled out in early November due to an undisclosed injury and was replaced by Randa Markos.

Souza faced Amanda Lemos on March 6, 2021, at UFC 259. After being knocked down twice, she lost the fight via technical knockout in round one.

Souza faced Randa Markos on October 23, 2021, at UFC Fight Night 196. She lost the fight via unanimous decision.

On November 11, 2021, it was announced that Souza was no longer on the UFC roster.

== Personal life ==
On January 24, 2025, it was reported that Souza had been arrested in Brazil, accused of being involved in drug trafficking and illegally possessing a weapon.

== Championships and accomplishments ==
=== Mixed martial arts ===
- Invicta Fighting Championships
  - Invicta FC Strawweight Champion (one time; former)
    - One successful title defense
  - Fight of the Night (one time) vs. Janaisa Morandin
  - Performance of the Night (three times) vs. Katja Kankaanpää, DeAnna Bennett and Ayaka Hamasaki
- Fight Matrix
  - 2013 Female Rookie of the Year

== Mixed martial arts record ==
Professional record breakdown
18 matches	14 wins	4 losses
By knockout	2	1
By submission	8	0
By decision	4	3

Res.	Record	Opponent	Method	Event	Date	Round	Time	Location	Notes
Loss	14–4	Randa Markos	Decision (unanimous)	UFC Fight Night: Costa vs. Vettori	October 23, 2021	3	5:00	Las Vegas, Nevada, United States	
Loss	14–3	Amanda Lemos	TKO (punches)	UFC 259	March 6, 2021	1	3:39	Las Vegas, Nevada, United States	
Win	14–2	Ashley Yoder	Decision (unanimous)	UFC 252	August 15, 2020	3	5:00	Las Vegas, Nevada, United States	
Loss	13–2	Brianna Van Buren	Decision (unanimous)	UFC Fight Night: de Randamie vs. Ladd	July 13, 2019	3	5:00	Sacramento, California, United States	
Win	13–1	Sarah Frota	Decision (split)	UFC Fight Night: Assunção vs. Moraes 2	February 2, 2019	3	5:00	Fortaleza, Brazil	Catchweight (123 lb) bout; Frota missed weight.
Win	12–1	Alex Chambers	Submission (guillotine choke)	UFC Fight Night: Santos vs. Anders	September 22, 2018	1	1:21	São Paulo, Brazil	
Win	11–1	Janaisa Morandin	Decision (unanimous)	Invicta FC 25: Kunitskaya vs. Pa'aluhi	August 31, 2017	3	5:00	Lemoore, California, United States	Fight of the Night.
Win	10–1	Ayaka Hamasaki	KO (punches)	Invicta FC 22: Evinger vs. Kunitskaya II	March 25, 2017	1	1:41	Kansas City, Missouri, United States	Performance of the Night.
Loss	9–1	Angela Hill	Decision (split)	Invicta FC 17: Evinger vs. Schneider	May 7, 2016	5	5:00	Costa Mesa, California, United States	Lost the Invicta FC Strawweight Championship.
Win	9–0	DeAnna Bennett	TKO (body kick and punches)	Invicta FC 15: Cyborg vs. Ibragimova	January 16, 2016	1	1:30	Costa Mesa, California, United States	Defended the Invicta FC Strawweight Championship. Performance of the Night.
Win	8–0	Katja Kankaanpää	Submission (triangle choke)	Invicta FC 12: Kankaanpää vs. Souza	April 24, 2015	4	3:58	Kansas City, Missouri, United States	Won the Invicta FC Strawweight Championship. Performance of the Night.
Win	7–0	Camila Lima	Submission (rear-naked choke)	Talent MMA Circuit 12: Campinas 2014	September 20, 2014	1	0:47	São Paulo, Brazil	Won the Talent MMA Circuit Strawweight Championship.
Win	6–0	Edlane Franca Godoy	Submission (armbar)	XFMMA 9	August 21, 2014	1	4:01	São Paulo, Brazil	Won the XFMMA Strawweight Championship.
Win	5–0	Bianca Reis	Submission (triangle choke)	Costa Combat MMA	December 14, 2013	1	0:42	São Paulo, Brazil	Won the Costa Combat MMA Strawweight Championship.
Win	4–0	Aline Sattelmayer	Decision (unanimous)	Talent MMA Circuit 4: Itatiba 2013	October 26, 2013	3	5:00	São Paulo, Brazil	
Win	3–0	Andressa Rocha	Submission (armbar)	PFC 24	August 9, 2013	2	4:02	São Paulo, Brazil	Won the Predador FC Flyweight Championship.
Win	2–0	Aline Sattelmayer	Submission (heel hook)	XFMMA 26	July 27, 2013	1	0:24	São Paulo, Brazil	
Win	1–0	Cindia Candela Faria	Submission (armbar)	PFC 23	March 9, 2013	1	2:35	São Paulo, Brazil	Flyweight debut.

== See also ==
- List of female mixed martial artists

Awards and achievements
Preceded by Katja Kankaanpää	3rd Invicta FC Strawweight Champion; April 24, 2015 – May 7, 2016	Succeeded by Angela Hill
