= Amanda Lemos =

Brazilian mixed martial arts fighter

- Born: Amanda Oliveira de Lemos; May 22, 1987 (age 39); Belém, Pará, Brazil
- Other names: Amandinha
- Height: 5 ft 4 in (1.63 m)
- Weight: 115 lb (52 kg; 8 st 3 lb)
- Division: Strawweight (2020–present); Bantamweight (until 2019)
- Reach: 65 in (165 cm)
- Fighting out of: Pará, Brazil
- Team: Marajó Brothers Team
- Years active: 2014–present

Mixed martial arts record
- Total: 23
- Wins: 15
- By knockout: 8
- By submission: 3
- By decision: 4
- Losses: 7
- By knockout: 1
- By submission: 2
- By decision: 4
- Draws: 1

Other information
- Mixed martial arts record from Sherdog

Amanda Oliveira de Lemos (born May 22, 1987) is a Brazilian mixed martial artist who competes in the women's Strawweight division of the Ultimate Fighting Championship. As of October 31, 2026, she is #14 in the Meta UFC women's strawweight rankings.

== Mixed martial arts career ==
=== Early career ===
Lemos started her professional mixed martial arts career in her native Brazilian regional circuit, fighting mostly in Jungle Fight. Racking up an undefeated record of 5–0, she faced Mayra Cantuária for the Jungle Fight Women's Bantamweight Championship at Jungle Fight 85 on January 23, 2016. The fight ended in a majority draw, which prompted a rematch between the two contenders. The rematch for the title took place on June 25, 2016, at Jungle Fight 88. Lemos won the title via third-round knockout.

Lemos was scheduled to face Arlene Blencowe at Legend MMA 1 on January 28, 2017. However, Lemos withdrew from the bout and was replaced by Janay Harding.

=== Ultimate Fighting Championship ===
Replacing injured Lina Länsberg on short notice, Lemos made her promotional debut against Leslie Smith at UFC Fight Night: Nelson vs. Ponzinibbio on July 16, 2017. She lost the lopsided fight via second-round knockout.

On March 28, 2018, news surfaced that USADA had suspended Lemos for two years for testing positive for stanozolol and its metabolite, stemming from a sample taken on November 8, 2017.

==== Dropping to strawweight ====
Lemos was scheduled to return from the suspension against Veronica Macedo in a strawweight bout on December 21, 2019, at UFC Fight Night 165. However, Macedo withdrew from the bout due to concussion-like symptoms and was replaced by Miranda Granger. She won the fight via technical submission.

Lemos faced Mizuki Inoue at UFC on ESPN 15 on August 22, 2020. She won the fight via unanimous decision.

Lemos faced Lívia Renata Souza on March 6, 2021, at UFC 259. She won the fight via technical knockout in round one after knocking Souza down twice.

Lemos faced Montserrat Ruiz on July 17, 2021, at UFC on ESPN 26. Lemos won the fight via technical knockout in round one.

Lemos was scheduled to face Nina Nunes on December 18, 2021, at UFC Fight Night 199. However, Nunes was removed from the bout for undisclosed reasons and was replaced by Angela Hill. Lemos won the bout via split decision. 10 out of 11 media scores gave it to Hill. This bout earned them the Fight of the Night bonus award.

Lemos faced former strawweight champion Jéssica Andrade on April 23, 2022, at UFC Fight Night 205. She lost the fight via a standing arm-triangle choke in round one.

Lemos faced Michelle Waterson on July 16, 2022, at UFC on ABC 3. She won the fight via guillotine choke submission in the second round. This win earned Lemos her first Performance of the Night bonus award.

Lemos was scheduled to face Marina Rodriguez on October 22, 2022, at UFC 280, but the bout was postponed to UFC Fight Night 214 for unknown reasons. She won the fight via technical knockout in the third round.

Lemos faced Zhang Weili for the UFC Women's Strawweight Championship on August 19, 2023, at UFC 292. She lost the fight via unanimous decision.

Lemos was scheduled to face Tatiana Suarez on February 17, 2024, at UFC 298. However, Suarez was withdrawn from the event because of an injury was replaced by Mackenzie Dern. Lemos won the bout by unanimous decision. This fight earned her another Fight of the Night award.

Lemos faced Virna Jandiroba on July 20, 2024, at UFC on ESPN 60. She lost the fight by an armbar submission in the second round.

Lemos faced Iasmin Lucindo on March 8, 2025, at UFC 313. She won the fight by unanimous decision.

Lemos' bout with Tatiana Suarez was re-scheduled and took place on September 13, 2025, at UFC Fight Night 259. She lost the fight by unanimous decision.

Replacing an injured Iasmin Lucindo, Lemos was scheduled to face Gillian Robertson on December 13, 2025, at UFC on ESPN 73. However, Lemos was removed from the card by the Nevada State Athletic Commission on the day of the event due to a mouth injury. The bout was rescheduled for March 14, 2026, at UFC Fight Night 269.

Lemos ended up facing Robertson on March 14, 2026 at UFC Fight Night 269. She lost the fight by unanimous decision.

Lemos was scheduled to face Denise Gomes on August 8, 2026 at UFC Fight Night 284. However, for undisclosed reasons, Gomes was replaced by Alexia Thainara. She lost the fight by unanimous decision.

== Championships and accomplishments ==
- Ultimate Fighting Championship
  - Fight of the Night (Two times) vs. Angela Hill and Mackenzie Dern
  - Performance of the Night (One time) vs. Michelle Waterson
  - Tied (Rose Namajunas, Mackenzie Dern & Tatiana Suarez) for second most finishes in UFC Women's Strawweight division history (5)
  - Most knockdowns landed in UFC Women's Strawweight division history (6)
    - Second most knockdowns landed-per-15-minutes in UFC Women's Strawweight division history (0.59)
  - Tied (Denise Gomes) for second most knockouts in UFC Women's Strawweight division history (3)
  - Fifth highest significant strike accuracy in UFC Women's Strawweight division history (54.0%)
  - Fourth fewest strikes absorbed-per-minute in UFC Women's Strawweight division history (2.51)
- Jungle Fight
  - Jungle Fight Women's Bantamweight Champion (One time)
    - Two successful title defenses
- MMA Fighting
  - 2022 Second Team MMA All-Star

== Mixed martial arts record ==
Professional record breakdown
23 matches	15 wins	7 losses
By knockout	8	1
By submission	3	2
By decision	4	4
Draws	1	

Res.	Record	Opponent	Method	Event	Date	Round	Time	Location	Notes
Loss	15–7–1	Alexia Thainara	Decision (unanimous)	UFC Fight Night: Gamrot vs. Salkilld	August 8, 2026	3	5:00	Las Vegas, Nevada, United States	
Loss	15–6–1	Gillian Robertson	Decision (unanimous)	UFC Fight Night: Emmett vs. Vallejos	March 14, 2026	3	5:00	Las Vegas, Nevada, United States	
Loss	15–5–1	Tatiana Suarez	Decision (unanimous)	UFC Fight Night: Lopes vs. Silva	September 13, 2025	3	5:00	San Antonio, Texas, United States	
Win	15–4–1	Iasmin Lucindo	Decision (unanimous)	UFC 313	March 8, 2025	3	5:00	Las Vegas, Nevada, United States	
Loss	14–4–1	Virna Jandiroba	Submission (armbar)	UFC on ESPN: Lemos vs. Jandiroba	July 20, 2024	2	4:48	Las Vegas, Nevada, United States	
Win	14–3–1	Mackenzie Dern	Decision (unanimous)	UFC 298	February 17, 2024	3	5:00	Anaheim, California, United States	Fight of the Night.
Loss	13–3–1	Zhang Weili	Decision (unanimous)	UFC 292	August 19, 2023	5	5:00	Boston, Massachusetts, United States	For the UFC Women's Strawweight Championship.
Win	13–2–1	Marina Rodriguez	TKO (punches)	UFC Fight Night: Rodriguez vs. Lemos	November 5, 2022	3	0:54	Las Vegas, Nevada, United States	
Win	12–2–1	Michelle Waterson	Submission (guillotine choke)	UFC on ABC: Ortega vs. Rodríguez	July 16, 2022	2	1:48	Elmont, New York, United States	Performance of the Night.
Loss	11–2–1	Jéssica Andrade	Submission (arm-triangle choke)	UFC Fight Night: Lemos vs. Andrade	April 23, 2022	1	3:13	Las Vegas, Nevada, United States	
Win	11–1–1	Angela Hill	Decision (split)	UFC Fight Night: Lewis vs. Daukaus	December 18, 2021	3	5:00	Las Vegas, Nevada, United States	Fight of the Night.
Win	10–1–1	Montserrat Ruiz	TKO (punches)	UFC on ESPN: Makhachev vs. Moisés	July 17, 2021	1	0:35	Las Vegas, Nevada, United States	
Win	9–1–1	Lívia Renata Souza	TKO (punches)	UFC 259	March 6, 2021	1	3:39	Las Vegas, Nevada, United States	
Win	8–1–1	Mizuki Inoue	Decision (unanimous)	UFC on ESPN: Munhoz vs. Edgar	August 22, 2020	3	5:00	Las Vegas, Nevada, United States	
Win	7–1–1	Miranda Granger	Technical Submission (rear-naked choke)	UFC Fight Night: Edgar vs. The Korean Zombie	December 21, 2019	1	3:43	Busan, South Korea	Strawweight debut.
Loss	6–1–1	Leslie Smith	TKO (punches)	UFC Fight Night: Nelson vs. Ponzinibbio	July 16, 2017	2	2:53	Glasgow, Scotland	
Win	6–0–1	Mayra Cantuária	KO (knee)	Jungle Fight 88	June 25, 2016	3	0:28	Poços de Caldas, Brazil	Defended the Jungle Fight Women's Bantamweight Championship.
Draw	5–0–1	Mayra Cantuária	Draw (majority)	Jungle Fight 85	January 23, 2016	3	5:00	São Paulo, Brazil	Retained the Jungle Fight Women's Bantamweight Championship.
Win	5–0	Carol Cunha	Submission (guillotine choke)	Jungle Fight 82	October 24, 2015	1	2:15	São Paulo, Brazil	Won the vacant Jungle Fight Women's Bantamweight Championship.
Win	4–0	Carol Abdon	TKO (punches)	Fusão de Artes Marciais 5	September 26, 2015	1	3:20	Soure, Brazil	
Win	3–0	Débora Dias Nascimento	TKO (punches)	Jungle Fight 77	May 9, 2015	1	3:23	Foz do Iguaçu, Brazil	
Win	2–0	Alenice Correa Costa	TKO (punches)	Jurunense Open Fight MMA 8	September 25, 2014	1	4:15	Belém, Brazil	
Win	1–0	Laura Falcão	TKO (punches)	Fusão de Artes Marciais 3	July 17, 2014	1	4:23	Soure, Brazil	

== See also ==
- List of current UFC fighters
- List of female mixed martial artists
