= Jessica Aguilar =

Mexican mixed martial arts fighter

- Born: May 8, 1982 (age 44); Poza Rica, Veracruz, Mexico
- Other names: JAG
- Height: 5 ft 3 in (1.60 m)
- Weight: 115 lb (52 kg; 8.2 st)
- Division: Strawweight
- Reach: 63 in (160 cm)
- Fighting out of: Coconut Creek, Florida, U.S.
- Team: American Top Team (2006–2020); Main Street Boxing (2020–present)
- Rank: Black belt in Brazilian jiu-jitsu
- Years active: 2006–present (MMA)

Mixed martial arts record
- Total: 30
- Wins: 20
- By knockout: 2
- By submission: 8
- By decision: 10
- Losses: 10
- By submission: 2
- By decision: 8

Other information
- Website: http://jessicaaguilar.com/
- Mixed martial arts record from Sherdog

Jessica Aguilar (born May 8, 1982) is a Mexican mixed martial artist, who competes in strawweight division. At the time of her voluntary departure from World Series of Fighting, she was the reigning WSOF Women's Strawweight Champion. Aguilar previously competed for Bellator Fighting Championships and Ultimate Fighting Championship. She was the first Mexican female fighter to become an MMA world champion during her time with WSOF, and subsequently, she was also the first Mexican woman to compete in the UFC.

== Mixed martial arts career ==
=== Early career ===
Jessica Aguilar made her professional mixed martial arts debut on February 18, 2006, at Absolute Fighting Championships 15. She faced Lisa Ellis and was defeated by submission due to a rear-naked choke in the second round.

On February 17, 2007, Aguilar faced Japanese pro wrestler Sumie Sakai at Combat Fighting Championship 3. She defeated Sakai by unanimous decision.

Aguilar faced Valerie Coolbaugh on March 5, 2010, at Action Fight League: Rock-N-Rumble 2. She defeated Coolbaugh by submission due to a triangle choke in the second round.

Aguilar returned to Action Fight League on June 4, 2010, at Rock-N-Rumble 3. She defeated Catia Vitoria by TKO in the first round.

=== Bellator Fighting Championships ===
On June 23, 2010, Bellator Fighting Championships announced that Aguilar had signed on to take part in the promotion's 115 lbs women's tournament.

Aguilar made her Bellator debut at Bellator 24 on August 12, 2010. She defeated Lynn Alvarez by submission due to an arm-triangle choke in the first round to advance to the semi-finals of the Bellator tournament.

On September 30, 2010, Aguilar faced Zoila Frausto Gurgel at Bellator 31. She was defeated by a controversial split decision, having dominated most of the match.

Aguilar was scheduled to make her Jewels debut in Japan on March 11, 2011, against Ayaka Hamasaki, but the event was cancelled due to the 2011 Tōhoku earthquake and tsunami.

On June 25, 2011, Aguilar returned to Bellator and faced Carla Esparza at Bellator 46. She defeated Esparza by split decision.

Aguilar agreed to rematch Zoila Frausto Gurgel in a non-title bout at a Bellator event in late October. However, she withdrew from the planned fight due to a prolonged recovery from foot surgery after her June win over Esparza.

Aguilar faced Lisa Ellis in a rematch at Bellator 58 on November 19, 2011. She missed weight for the fight, but won by unanimous decision.

Aguilar next faced Patricia Vidonic at Fight Time Promotions 8 on February 17, 2012. She defeated Vidonic by unanimous decision.

Aguilar returned to Bellator to face Megumi Fujii at Bellator 69 on May 18, 2012. She defeated Fujii by unanimous decision.

On March 28, 2013, Aguilar faced Patricia Vidonic in a rematch at Bellator 94. She won the back-and-forth fight via split decision.

Along with Jessica Eye, Aguilar was released by Bellator on August 13, 2013. Aguilar and Eye were the last remaining female fighters on the Bellator roster.

Aguilar faced Megumi Fujii in a rematch at Vale Tudo Japan 3rd on October 5, 2013, in Tokyo, Japan. Aguilar initially won by TKO when the doctor stopped the fight after round two due to a Fujii eye injury that was caused by two accidental eye pokes. The result of the fight was later changed to a technical majority decision win for Aguilar.

=== World Series of Fighting ===
It was announced on November 11, 2013, that Aguilar had signed with World Series of Fighting, becoming the first female fighter to sign with the promotion.

==== WSOF Women's Strawweight Championship ====
Aguilar made her WSOF debut on January 18, 2014, as she faced Alida Gray at WSOF 8 for the WSOF Women's Strawweight Championship. She won the fight via submission in the first round to become the promotion's first female champion and first Mexican woman MMA world champion.

In her first title defense, Aguilar faced Emi Fujino on June 21, 2014, at WSOF 10. She won the fight via unanimous decision.

Aguilar made her second title defense against Kalindra Faria on November 15, 2014, at WSOF 15. She again was victorious via unanimous decision.

On May 18, 2015, Aguilar was granted her release from WSOF, to pursue fighting in the UFC.

=== Ultimate Fighting Championship ===
On June 11, 2015, it was announced that Aguilar officially signed with the Ultimate Fighting Championship (UFC), becoming the first Mexican female fighter to compete there. She made her debut against Cláudia Gadelha on August 1, 2015, at UFC 190. She lost the fight by unanimous decision.

Aguilar's next bout was expected to be against Juliana Lima at UFC 197. However, on March 18 she revealed that she had torn her ACL and that it would require surgery; she would subsequently be replaced by Carla Esparza.

Aguilar next faced Cortney Casey at UFC 211 on May 13, 2017. She lost the fight via unanimous decision. However, the result of the fight was overturned to a No Contest after an in-competition drug test by Casey tested positive for elevated levels of testosterone. In turn, on June 30, the TDLR lifted Casey's three-month suspension and gave back her victory, which was overturned to a no contest.

Aguilar was scheduled to face Livia Renata Souza on February 18, 2018, at UFC Fight Night: Cowboy vs. Medeiros. However, Souza pulled out on February 10 due to a hand injury and the bout was scrapped.

Aguilar was scheduled to face Jodie Esquibel on June 1, 2018, at UFC Fight Night 131. Aguilar successfully weighed in, but the bout was removed from the card the day of the event by the NYSAC due to a concern over a medical issue with Aguilar. The pair eventually faced each other at UFC Fight Night 133 on July 14, 2018. Aguilar won the fight by unanimous decision.

Aguilar faced Zhang Weili on November 24, 2018, at UFC Fight Night 141. She lost the fight via submission in round one.

Aguilar faced Marina Rodriguez on March 30, 2019, at UFC on ESPN 2. She lost the fight via unanimous decision.

On May 16, 2019, it was reported that Aguilar was released the by UFC.

=== Xtreme Fighting Championships ===
On October 5, 2020, it was announced that Aguilar signed with Xtreme Fighting Championships and would make her debut in November 2020. Later, it was announced that Aguilar would make her promotional debut against Danielle Taylor at XFC 43 on November 11, 2020. She lost the fight via split decision.

=== Rizin FF ===
In July 2022 it was revealed that Aguilar would participate Rizin FF 2022 Super Atomweight Grand Prix and would face Ayaka Hamasaki in the quarterfinals at Rizin 37 on July 31, 2022.

=== Global Fight League ===
Aguilar was scheduled to face Natalia Kuziutina on May 25, 2025, at GFL 2. However, the first two GFL events were postponed indefinitely.

== Personal life ==
Outside of mixed martial arts, Aguilar currently manages franchise development for the Boca Tanning Club chain in Florida. She is openly lesbian and is dating actress Shalita Grant as of 2020.

== Championships and accomplishments ==
=== Mixed martial arts ===
- Bellator Fighting Championships
  - Bellator Season 3 Women's 115 lbs Tournament Semi-finalist
- Women's MMA Awards
  - 2011 Female Flyweight of the Year
  - 2010 Female Fan Favorite of the Year
  - 2012 Florida MMA Female Fighter of the Year
- World Series of Fighting
  - WSOF Women's Strawweight Championship (First; One time)
    - Two successful title defenses

=== Submission grappling ===
- International Federation of Associated Wrestling Styles
  - FILA 2010 Grappling World Championships Women's Senior No-Gi Gold Medalist
  - FILA 2009 Grappling World Championships Women's Senior Gi Bronze Medalist
  - FILA 2009 Grappling World Championships Women's Senior No-Gi Gold Medalist

== Mixed martial arts record ==
Professional record breakdown
30 matches	20 wins	10 losses
By knockout	2	0
By submission	8	2
By decision	10	8

Res.	Record	Opponent	Method	Event	Date	Round	Time	Location	Notes
Loss	20–10	Ayaka Hamasaki	Decision (unanimous)	Rizin 37	July 31, 2022	3	5:00	Saitama, Japan	2022 Rizin Super Atomweight Grand Prix Quarterfinal.
Loss	20–9	Danielle Taylor	Decision (split)	XFC 43	November 11, 2020	3	5:00	Atlanta, Georgia, United States	
Loss	20–8	Marina Rodriguez	Decision (unanimous)	UFC on ESPN: Barboza vs. Gaethje	March 30, 2019	3	5:00	Philadelphia, Pennsylvania, United States	Rodriguez was deducted one point in round 1 due to repeated eye pokes.
Loss	20–7	Zhang Weili	Submission (armbar)	UFC Fight Night: Blaydes vs. Ngannou 2	November 24, 2018	1	3:41	Beijing, China	
Win	20–6	Jodie Esquibel	Decision (unanimous)	UFC Fight Night: dos Santos vs. Ivanov	July 14, 2018	3	5:00	Boise, Idaho, United States	
Loss	19–6	Cortney Casey	Decision (unanimous)	UFC 211	May 13, 2017	3	5:00	Dallas, Texas, United States	
Loss	19–5	Cláudia Gadelha	Decision (unanimous)	UFC 190	August 1, 2015	3	5:00	Rio de Janeiro, Brazil	UFC Women's Strawweight title eliminator.
Win	19–4	Kalindra Faria	Decision (unanimous)	WSOF 15	November 15, 2014	5	5:00	Tampa, Florida, United States	Defended the WSOF Women's Strawweight Championship.
Win	18–4	Emi Fujino	Decision (unanimous)	WSOF 10	June 21, 2014	5	5:00	Las Vegas, Nevada, United States	Defended the WSOF Women's Strawweight Championship.
Win	17–4	Alida Gray	Submission (arm-triangle choke)	WSOF 8	January 18, 2014	1	2:45	Hollywood, Florida, United States	Won the inaugural WSOF Women's Strawweight Championship.
Win	16–4	Megumi Fujii	Technical decision (majority)	Vale Tudo Japan 3rd	October 5, 2013	2	5:00	Tokyo, Japan	
Win	15–4	Patricia Vidonic	Decision (split)	Bellator 94	March 28, 2013	3	5:00	Tampa, Florida, United States	
Win	14–4	Megumi Fujii	Decision (unanimous)	Bellator 69	May 18, 2012	3	5:00	Lake Charles, Louisiana, United States	
Win	13–4	Patricia Vidonic	Decision (unanimous)	Fight Time Promotions 8	February 17, 2012	3	5:00	Fort Lauderdale, Florida, United States	
Win	12–4	Lisa Ellis	Decision (unanimous)	Bellator 58	November 19, 2011	3	5:00	Hollywood, Florida, United States	
Win	11–4	Carla Esparza	Decision (split)	Bellator 46	June 25, 2011	3	5:00	Hollywood, Florida, United States	
Win	10–4	Elsie Henri	Submission (armbar)	G-Force Fights: Bad Blood 4	November 18, 2010	1	1:22	Coral Gables, Florida, United States	
Loss	9–4	Zoila Frausto	Decision (split)	Bellator 31	September 30, 2010	3	5:00	Lake Charles, Louisiana, United States	Bellator Season 3 Women's 115 lbs Tournament Semi-final.
Win	9–3	Lynn Alvarez	Submission (arm-triangle choke)	Bellator 24	August 12, 2010	1	4:01	Hollywood, Florida, United States	Bellator Season 3 Women's 115 lbs Tournament Quarterfinal.
Win	8–3	Catia Vitoria	TKO (punches)	Action Fight League: Rock-N-Rumble 3	June 4, 2010	1	4:17	Hollywood, Florida, United States	
Win	7–3	Valerie Coolbaugh	Submission (triangle choke)	Action Fight League: Rock-N-Rumble 2	March 5, 2010	2	3:28	Hollywood, Florida, United States	
Win	6–3	Amanda Duvall	Submission (arm-triangle choke)	Unconquered 1: November Reign	November 20, 2009	2	1:32	Coral Gables, Florida, United States	
Loss	5–3	Angela Magaña	Decision (majority)	HOOKnSHOOT: GFight 2009 Grand Prix	January 16, 2009	3	3:00	Evansville, Indiana, United States	HOOKnSHOOT GFight 2009 115 lbs Grand Prix Quarterfinal.
Win	5–2	Angela Magaña	Technical submission (blood in the eye)	WFC 6: Battle in the Bay	March 22, 2008	3	1:53	Tampa, Florida, United States	Magaña tried to signal to the referee that Aguilar was bleeding into her eye and the referee mistook this for a verbal submission.
Loss	4–2	Carina Damm	Decision (unanimous)	BodogFight: Vancouver	August 25, 2007	3	5:00	Vancouver, British Columbia, Canada	
Win	4–1	Angela Magaña	Submission (armbar)	WFC 3: Turf Wars	April 7, 2007	1	3:09	Tampa, Florida, United States	
Win	3–1	Sumie Sakai	Decision (unanimous)	Combat Fighting Championship 3	February 17, 2007	3	5:00	Orlando, Florida, United States	
Win	2–1	Tamera Arnold	Submission (guillotine choke)	Combat Fighting Championship 2	September 23, 2006	2	4:40	Orlando, Florida, United States	
Win	1–1	Lindsay Ketchum	TKO (corner stoppage)	Combat Fighting Championship 1	July 15, 2006	1	5:00	Orlando, Florida, United States	
Loss	0–1	Lisa Ellis	Submission (rear-naked choke)	Absolute Fighting Championships 15	February 18, 2006	2	2:53	Fort Lauderdale, Florida, United States	

== See also ==
- List of female mixed martial artists
- List of Mexican UFC fighters
