= Montserrat Ruiz =

Mexican mixed martial arts fighter

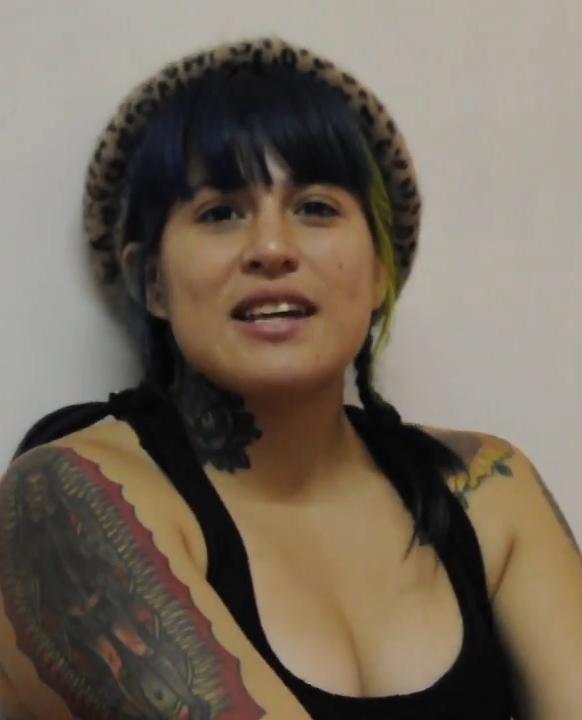
- Born: Avelina Montserrat Conejo Ruiz; February 3, 1993 (age 33); León, Guanajuato, México
- Other names: Conejo
- Height: 5 ft 0 in (1.52 m)
- Weight: 115 lb (52 kg; 8 st 3 lb)
- Division: Strawweight (2016–present); Flyweight (2014–2015)
- Reach: 61 in (155 cm)
- Style: Wrestling
- Fighting out of: El Paso, Texas, U.S.
- Team: Kings MMA El Paso; 10th Planet Jiu Jitsu
- Rank: Purple belt in Brazilian Jiu-Jitsu
- Years active: 2014–present

Mixed martial arts record
- Total: 15
- Wins: 10
- By knockout: 3
- By submission: 2
- By decision: 5
- Losses: 5
- By knockout: 3
- By decision: 2

Other information
- Mixed martial arts record from Sherdog

Avelina Montserrat Conejo Ruiz (born February 3, 1993) is a Mexican mixed martial artist who competes in the women's Strawweight division of the Ultimate Fighting Championship (UFC).

== Background ==
At the age of 16, Ruiz started practicing Olympic wrestling at the Técnica 1 in León, Guanajuato, later became a national selection, living for three years at the Centro Nacional de Alto Rendimiento (CNAR) in Mexico City and then made the leap to MMA. She was a 7-time national champion in Mexico.

== Mixed martial arts career ==
=== Early career ===
Montserrat Ruiz made her professional MMA debut in 2014 at the Gladiators Coliseum, a promoter in Mexico. She achieved a winning streak of nine fights fighting under various MMA promotions in Mexico, including Xtreme Fighters Latino, before entering the American circuit.

=== Invicta FC ===
Ruiz made her promotional debut for Invicta FC against UFC vet Danielle Taylor at Invicta FC 33 on December 15, 2018. She lost the fight via unanimous decision.

After the loss to Danielle, she suffered an injury that kept her out of the cage for more than a year.

In her sophomore performance, Ruiz faced Janaisa Morandin on July 30, 2020, at Invicta FC 41: Morandin vs. Ruiz. She won the bout with ease through first round scarf hold keylock submission.

Ruiz was scheduled to face Emily Ducote for the vacant Invicta FC Strawweight Championship at Invicta FC 43, however on the day of the event, the fight was cancelled due to COVID precautions.

=== Ultimate Fighting Championship ===
Ruiz made her UFC debut as a short notice replacement for Kay Hansen against Cheyanne Buys on March 20, 2021, at UFC on ESPN: Brunson vs. Holland. She won the bout via unanimous decision, keeping Buys in the headlock position for most of the bout.

Ruiz faced Amanda Lemos on July 17, 2021, at UFC on ESPN 26. Ruiz lost the fight via a technical knockout in round one.

Ruiz was scheduled to face Mallory Martin on December 4, 2021, at UFC on ESPN 31. However Ruiz was forced out of the event and she was replaced by Cheyanne Buys.

After a 2-year layoff, Ruiz faced Jaqueline Amorim on August 12, 2023, at UFC on ESPN: Luque vs. dos Anjos. She lost the fight via technical knockout in round three.

Ruiz faced Eduarda Moura, replacing So Yul Kim, on November 4, 2023, at UFC Fight Night 231. At the weigh-ins, Moura weighed in at 119.5 pounds, three and a half pounds over the strawweight non-title fight limit. The bout proceeded at catchweight and Moura was fined 30% of her purse which went to Ruiz. She lost the fight via technical knockout in the second round.

After another 2-year layoff, Ruiz faced Alice Ardelean on November 1, 2025, at UFC Fight Night 263. She lost the fight by unanimous decision.

== Championships and accomplishments ==
=== Mixed martial arts ===
- Ultimate Fighting Championship
  - UFC.com Awards
    - 2021: Ranked #8 Upset of the Year vs. Cheyanne Vlismas
- Xtreme Fighters Latino
  - XFL Strawweight Championship
- MAX Fights
  - MAX Fights Strawweight Championship

== Mixed martial arts record ==
Professional record breakdown
15 matches	10 wins	5 losses
By knockout	3	3
By submission	2	0
By decision	5	2

Res.	Record	Opponent	Method	Event	Date	Round	Time	Location	Notes
Loss	10–5	Alice Ardelean	Decision (unanimous)	UFC Fight Night: Garcia vs. Onama	November 1, 2025	3	5:00	Las Vegas, Nevada, United States	
Loss	10–4	Eduarda Moura	TKO (punches)	UFC Fight Night: Almeida vs. Lewis	November 4, 2023	2	2:14	São Paulo, Brazil	Catchweight (119.5 lb) bout; Moura missed weight.
Loss	10–3	Jaqueline Amorim	TKO (elbows and punches)	UFC on ESPN: Luque vs. dos Anjos	August 12, 2023	3	3:41	Las Vegas, Nevada, United States	
Loss	10–2	Amanda Lemos	TKO (punches)	UFC on ESPN: Makhachev vs. Moisés	July 17, 2021	1	0:35	Las Vegas, Nevada, United States	
Win	10–1	Cheyanne Vlismas	Decision (unanimous)	UFC on ESPN: Brunson vs. Holland	March 20, 2021	3	5:00	Las Vegas, Nevada, United States	
Win	9–1	Janaisa Morandin	Submission (scarf hold armlock)	Invicta FC 41: Morandin vs. Ruiz	July 30, 2020	1	3:28	Kansas City, Kansas, United States	Performance of the Night.
Loss	8–1	Danielle Taylor	Decision (unanimous)	Invicta FC 33: Frey vs. Grusander II	December 15, 2018	3	5:00	Kansas City, Missouri, United States	
Win	8–0	Sarai Saenz Flores	Decision (unanimous)	Xtreme Fighters Latino 36	December 9, 2017	3	5:00	Mexico City, Mexico	Won the XFL Strawweight Championship.
Win	7–0	Saray Orozco Rodriguez	Decision (unanimous)	The Art of Fighting: In Search of Glory	September 2, 2017	3	5:00	Guadalajara, Mexico	
Win	6–0	Jazmin Gonzalez	TKO (punches)	MAX Fights: Battle On The Beach	June 11, 2016	1	1:18	Zihuatanejo Mexico	Won the MAX Fights Strawweight Championship.
Win	5–0	Pamela Gonzalez	Submission (armbar)	MMA Madness 6	December 5, 2015	2	N/A	Mexico City, Mexico	Strawweight debut.
Win	4–0	Diana Reyes	TKO (punches)	Urban Fighting League 5	February 28, 2015	2	3:28	Cuautitlán Izcalli, Mexico	
Win	3–0	Paulette Reyes Hernandez	TKO (punches)	Maximum Cage Fighting VIP 5	October 18, 2014	3	3:03	Mexico City, Mexico	
Win	2–0	Annely Jimenez Garcia	Decision (unanimous)	Xtreme Kombat 25	August 30, 2014	3	5:00	Mexico City, Mexico	
Win	1–0	Lucy Moreno Murillo	Decision (split)	Gladiators Coliseum 10	March 30, 2014	3	5:00	León, Mexico	Flyweight debut.

== See also ==
- List of current UFC fighters
- List of female mixed martial artists
- List of Mexican UFC fighters
