= UFC on ESPN: Font vs. Aldo =

2021 MMA event

- The poster for UFC on ESPN: Font vs. Aldo
- Promotion: Ultimate Fighting Championship
- Date: December 4, 2021
- Venue: UFC Apex
- City: Enterprise, Nevada, United States
- Attendance: Not announced

Event chronology
UFC Fight Night: Vieira vs. Tate	UFC on ESPN: Font vs. Aldo	UFC 269: Oliveira vs. Poirier

UFC on ESPN: Font vs. Aldo (also known as UFC on ESPN 31 and UFC Vegas 44) was a mixed martial arts event produced by the Ultimate Fighting Championship that took place on December 4, 2021, at the UFC Apex facility in Enterprise, Nevada, part of the Las Vegas Metropolitan Area, United States.

== Background ==
A bantamweight bout between Rob Font and former WEC and two-time UFC Featherweight Champion José Aldo served as the event headliner.

Jimmy Crute and Jamahal Hill were expected to meet in a light heavyweight bout at UFC Fight Night: Santos vs. Walker, but they were eventually rescheduled for this event.

A heavyweight bout between Tanner Boser and Sergei Pavlovich was scheduled for this event. However, the bout was scrapped due to travel issues.

A middleweight bout between Maki Pitolo and Duško Todorović took place at the event. They were originally scheduled for UFC Fight Night: Rozenstruik vs. Sakai, but Pitolo pulled out due to undisclosed reasons.

A women's strawweight bout featuring Montserrat Ruiz and Mallory Martin was expected to take place at the event. However, Ruiz pulled out due to undisclosed reasons and was replaced by Cheyanne Vlismas.

Brad Tavares was expected to face Brendan Allen in a middleweight bout. He eventually pulled out in mid November and was replaced by Roman Dolidze. In turn, Dolidze was forced to pull out due to complications in his recovery from COVID-19 and was replaced by Chris Curtis.

A light heavyweight bout between William Knight and Alonzo Menifield took place at this event. They were previously expected to meet at UFC Fight Night: Rozenstruik vs. Gane and UFC 260, but the contest was cancelled both times due to positive COVID-19 tests from Menifield and Knight, respectively.

A welterweight bout between Matt Brown and Bryan Barberena was scheduled for the event. However, on November 23, Brown was removed from the contest due to testing positive for COVID-19. He was replaced by Darian Weeks.

Philipe Lins was expected to face Azamat Murzakanov in a light heavyweight bout at the event. However, Lins withdrew from the event due to undisclosed reasons and he was replaced by Jared Vanderaa, therefore changing the bout to heavyweight. Shortly after the weigh-ins, officials had announced that the bout had been cancelled due to Vanderaa not being medically cleared.

A welterweight bout between Jake Matthews and Jeremiah Wells was expected to take place at the event. However, just hours before taking place, the bout was cancelled after one of Wells' cornermen tested positive for COVID-19.

== Results ==
Main card (ESPN/ESPN+)
Weight class				Method	Round	Time	Notes
Bantamweight	José Aldo	def.	Rob Font	Decision (unanimous) (50–45, 50–45, 49–46)	5	5:00
Lightweight	Rafael Fiziev	def.	Brad Riddell	KO (spinning wheel kick)	3	2:20
Light Heavyweight	Jamahal Hill	def.	Jimmy Crute	KO (punches)	1	0:48
Lightweight	Clay Guida	def.	Leonardo Santos	Submission (rear-naked choke)	2	1:21
Middleweight	Chris Curtis	def.	Brendan Allen	TKO (punches and knees)	2	1:58
Welterweight	Alex Morono	def.	Mickey Gall	Decision (unanimous) (30–27, 30–27, 30–27)	3	5:00
Preliminary card (ESPN/ESPN+)
Middleweight	Duško Todorović	def.	Maki Pitolo	TKO (punches)	1	4:34
Flyweight	Manel Kape	def.	Zhalgas Zhumagulov	TKO (punches)	1	4:02
Welterweight	Bryan Barberena	def.	Darian Weeks	Decision (unanimous) (29–28, 29–28, 29–28)	3	5:00
Women's Strawweight	Cheyanne Vlismas	def.	Mallory Martin	Decision (unanimous) (30–27, 29–28, 29–28)	3	5:00
Light Heavyweight	William Knight	def.	Alonzo Menifield	Decision (unanimous) (29–28, 29–28, 29–28)	3	5:00
Lightweight	Claudio Puelles	def.	Chris Gruetzemacher	Submission (kneebar)	3	3:25
Bantamweight	Vince Morales	def.	Louis Smolka	KO (punches)	1	2:02

== Bonus awards ==
The following fighters received $50,000 bonuses.

- Fight of the Night: Cheyanne Vlismas vs. Mallory Martin
- Performance of the Night: Rafael Fiziev, Jamahal Hill, Clay Guida, and Chris Curtis

== See also ==
- List of UFC events
- List of current UFC fighters
- 2021 in UFC
