= Marina Rodriguez =

Brazilian mixed martial arts fighter

- Born: Marina Alcalde Rodriguez; April 29, 1987 (age 39); Bagé, Rio Grande do Sul, Brazil
- Height: 5 ft 7 in (1.70 m)
- Weight: 115 lb (52 kg; 8 st 3 lb)
- Division: Strawweight (2015–2025); Flyweight (2021)
- Reach: 65 in (165 cm)
- Fighting out of: Florianópolis, Brazil
- Team: Thai Brasil; AS Team (Jiu-Jitsu)
- Trainer: Alexandre de Souza (Jiu-Jitsu coach); Marcio Malko (Muay Thai)
- Rank: Purple belt in Brazilian Jiu-Jitsu under Alexandre de Souza; Dark blue with black tip belt in Muay Thai
- Years active: 2015–2025

Mixed martial arts record
- Total: 25
- Wins: 17
- By knockout: 7
- By submission: 1
- By decision: 9
- Losses: 6
- By knockout: 2
- By decision: 4
- Draws: 2

Other information
- Mixed martial arts record from Sherdog

Marina Alcalde Rodriguez (born April 29, 1987) is a Brazilian former mixed martial artist. She competed in the women's Strawweight division of the Ultimate Fighting Championship (UFC), achieving a 7–6–2 record with the promotion.

== Background ==
Rodriguez was born in Bagé, Brazil. She has two brothers, Gabriel and Roberto, the latter a two-time Parapan American Games gold medalist in swimming. In her youth, Rodriguez played football, volleyball, basketball, and handball. Growing tired of the lack of physical exercise in her job as a graphic designer, she started looking for a way to lose some gained weight. She then found her current coach, Marcio Malko. Eventually, she joined a muay Thai class in 2013 and soon thereafter started taking amateur bouts.

== Mixed martial arts career ==
=== Early career ===
Rodriguez started her professional MMA career in 2015 and fought primarily in Brazil and amassed a record of 9–0 before competing in Dana White's Contender Series Brazil. Her last fight before going on contender series was a victory over future UFC Women's Flyweight Champion Natália Silva.

=== Dana White's Contender Series ===
Rodriguez appeared in Dana White's Contender Series (DWCS) Dana White's Contender Series Brazil 2 web-series program on August 11, 2018, facing Maria de Oliveira Neta. She won the fight via technical knockout in the first round.

=== Ultimate Fighting Championship ===
Rodriguez made her UFC debut on September 22, 2018, against Randa Markos at UFC Fight Night: Santos vs. Anders. The back and forth contest was ultimately ruled a majority draw.

Rodriguez next faced Jessica Aguilar on March 30, 2019, at UFC on ESPN: Barboza vs. Gaethje against. She won the fight via unanimous decision.

Rodriguez faced Tecia Torres on August 10, 2019, at UFC Fight Night 156. She won the fight via unanimous decision.

Rodriguez faced Cynthia Calvillo, replacing an injured Cláudia Gadelha, on December 7, 2019, at UFC on ESPN 7. At the weigh-ins, Calvillo weighed in at 120.5 pounds, 4.5 pounds over the strawweight non-title fight limit. The bout was held at a catchweight and Calvillo was fined 30% her purse, which went to Rodriguez. After three rounds of fighting, the bout ended with a majority draw.

Rodriguez was expected to face former UFC Women's Strawweight Champion Carla Esparza on July 15, 2020, at UFC Fight Night 172. However the bout was cancelled after one of Rodriguez's cornermen tested positive for COVID-19. The pair eventually fought at UFC on ESPN 14 on July 26, 2020. Rodriguez lost the fight via split decision. 9 out of 18 media outlets scored the bout for both Rodriguez and Esparza.

Rodriguez faced Amanda Ribas, replacing Michelle Waterson, on January 24, 2021, at UFC 257. Rodriguez won the fight via technical knockout in round two. This win earned her the Performance of the Night award.

As the first fight of her new, multi-fight contract, Rodriguez faced Michelle Waterson in a flyweight bout on May 8, 2021, at UFC on ESPN 24. She won the fight via unanimous decision.

Rodriguez faced Mackenzie Dern on October 9, 2021, at UFC Fight Night 194. She won the fight via unanimous decision. This fight earned her the Fight of the Night award.

Rodriguez faced Yan Xiaonan on March 5, 2022, at UFC 272. She won the fight via split decision.

Rodriguez was expected to face Amanda Lemos at UFC 280, but the bout was postponed to UFC Fight Night 214 for unknown reasons. She lost the fight via technical knockout in the third round.

Rodriguez was scheduled to face Virna Jandiroba on May 6, 2023, at UFC 288. She lost the fight by unanimous decision.

Rodriguez faced Michelle Waterson-Gomez in a rematch on September 23, 2023, at UFC Fight Night 228. She won the fight via technical knockout in round two. This win earned her the Performance of the Night award.

Rodriguez faced former UFC Women's Strawweight Champion Jéssica Andrade on April 13, 2024, at UFC 300. She lost the bout by split decision.

Rodriguez faced Iasmin Lucindo on October 5, 2024 at UFC 307. She lost the fight by split decision. 8 out of 13 media outlets scored the bout for Rodriguez.

Rodriguez faced Gillian Robertson on May 3, 2025 at UFC on ESPN 67. She lost the fight by technical knockout in the second round and subsequently announced her retirement from mixed martial arts competition.

== Championships and awards ==
=== Mixed martial arts ===
- Ultimate Fighting Championship
  - Performance of the Night (Two times) vs. Amanda Ribas and Michelle Waterson-Gomez
  - Fight of the Night (One time) vs. Mackenzie Dern
  - UFC.com Awards
    - 2021: Ranked #9 Fighter of the Year

== Mixed martial arts record ==
Professional record breakdown
25 matches	17 wins	6 losses
By knockout	7	2
By submission	1	0
By decision	9	4
Draws	2	

Res.	Record	Opponent	Method	Event	Date	Round	Time	Location	Notes
Loss	17–6–2	Gillian Robertson	TKO (punches)	UFC on ESPN: Sandhagen vs. Figueiredo	May 3, 2025	2	2:07	Des Moines, Iowa, United States	
Loss	17–5–2	Iasmin Lucindo	Decision (split)	UFC 307	October 5, 2024	3	5:00	Salt Lake City, Utah, United States	
Loss	17–4–2	Jéssica Andrade	Decision (split)	UFC 300	April 13, 2024	3	5:00	Las Vegas, Nevada, United States	
Win	17–3–2	Michelle Waterson-Gomez	TKO (elbows and punches)	UFC Fight Night: Fiziev vs. Gamrot	September 23, 2023	2	2:42	Las Vegas, Nevada, United States	Performance of the Night.
Loss	16–3–2	Virna Jandiroba	Decision (unanimous)	UFC 288	May 6, 2023	3	5:00	Newark, New Jersey, United States	
Loss	16–2–2	Amanda Lemos	TKO (punches)	UFC Fight Night: Rodriguez vs. Lemos	November 5, 2022	3	0:54	Las Vegas, Nevada, United States	
Win	16–1–2	Yan Xiaonan	Decision (split)	UFC 272	March 5, 2022	3	5:00	Las Vegas, Nevada, United States	
Win	15–1–2	Mackenzie Dern	Decision (unanimous)	UFC Fight Night: Dern vs. Rodriguez	October 9, 2021	5	5:00	Las Vegas, Nevada, United States	Return to Strawweight. Fight of the Night.
Win	14–1–2	Michelle Waterson-Gomez	Decision (unanimous)	UFC on ESPN: Rodriguez vs. Waterson	May 8, 2021	5	5:00	Las Vegas, Nevada, United States	Flyweight debut.
Win	13–1–2	Amanda Ribas	TKO (elbow and punches)	UFC 257	January 24, 2021	2	0:54	Abu Dhabi, United Arab Emirates	Performance of the Night.
Loss	12–1–2	Carla Esparza	Decision (split)	UFC on ESPN: Whittaker vs. Till	July 26, 2020	3	5:00	Abu Dhabi, United Arab Emirates	
Draw	12–0–2	Cynthia Calvillo	Draw (majority)	UFC on ESPN: Overeem vs. Rozenstruik	December 7, 2019	3	5:00	Washington, D.C., United States	Catchweight (120.5 lb) bout; Calvillo missed weight.
Win	12–0–1	Tecia Torres	Decision (unanimous)	UFC Fight Night: Shevchenko vs. Carmouche 2	August 10, 2019	3	5:00	Montevideo, Uruguay	
Win	11–0–1	Jessica Aguilar	Decision (unanimous)	UFC on ESPN: Barboza vs. Gaethje	March 30, 2019	3	5:00	Philadelphia, Pennsylvania, United States	Rodriguez was deducted one point in round 1 due to repeated eye pokes.
Draw	10–0–1	Randa Markos	Draw (majority)	UFC Fight Night: Santos vs. Anders	September 22, 2018	3	5:00	São Paulo, Brazil	
Win	10–0	Maria de Oliveira Neta	TKO (punches)	Dana White's Contender Series Brazil 2	August 11, 2018	1	3:03	Las Vegas, Nevada, United States	
Win	9–0	Natália Silva	Decision (unanimous)	Thunder Fight 13	December 22, 2017	3	5:00	São Paulo, Brazil	
Win	8–0	Amanda Torres Sardinha	Decision (unanimous)	Shooto Brazil 79	December 10, 2017	3	5:00	Rio de Janeiro, Brazil	
Win	7–0	Samara Santos Cunha	Decision (unanimous)	Fight 2 Night 2	April 28, 2017	3	5:00	Foz do Iguaçu, Brazil	
Win	6–0	Paula Vieira da Silva	TKO (punches)	Curitiba Top Fight 10	February 24, 2017	1	4:50	Curitiba, Brazil	Catchweight (121 lb) bout.
Win	5–0	Vanessa Guimaraes	Submission (triangle choke)	Aspera FC 41	July 9, 2016	2	1:47	São José, Brazil	
Win	4–0	Márcia Oliveira	TKO (punches)	Floripa FC: The Big Challenge	June 4, 2016	1	1:42	Florianópolis, Brazil	
Win	3–0	Caroline Silva	TKO (knee and punches)	Aspera FC 33	March 19, 2016	2	0:47	São José, Brazil	
Win	2–0	Caroline Silva	Decision (unanimous)	Aspera FC 24	September 12, 2015	3	5:00	São José, Brazil	
Win	1–0	Silvania Monteiro	TKO (retirement)	São José Super Fight 6	March 28, 2015	1	5:00	São José, Brazil	Strawweight debut.

== See also ==
- List of Dana White's Contender Series alumni
- List of female mixed martial artists
