= Cheyanne Vlismas =

American mixed martial artist (born 1995)

- Born: June 25, 1995 (age 31); Saint Petersburg, Florida, U.S.
- Other names: Cheyanne Buys; The Warrior Princess
- Height: 5 ft 3 in (1.60 m)
- Weight: 115 lb (52 kg; 8 st 3 lb)
- Division: Strawweight
- Reach: 63 in (160 cm)
- Fighting out of: Las Vegas, Nevada
- Team: Xtreme Couture; Fortis MMA
- Years active: 2018–2022

Mixed martial arts record
- Total: 10
- Wins: 7
- By knockout: 2
- By decision: 5
- Losses: 3
- By decision: 3

Other information
- Mixed martial arts record from Sherdog

Cheyanne Vlismas (born June 25, 1995), formerly known as Cheyanne Buys, is an American former mixed martial artist who competed in the Strawweight division of the Ultimate Fighting Championship.

== Background ==
Vlismas began training in karate when she was three years old and then transitioned to taekwondo when she was ten years old, later obtaining a black belt in the sport. She got into MMA at the age of fifteen. When she was seventeen, she got expelled from high school for fighting and her family decided to let her start training full time. She took her first amateur fight four days after her eighteenth birthday.

She is the ex-wife of fellow UFC fighter, JP Buys.

== Mixed martial arts career ==
=== Early career ===
Cheyanne made her MMA debut at LFA 35, where she faced Karla Hernandez and went on to defeat her via TKO in the third round, securing her first victory under the banner of Legacy Fighting Alliance in the process. Vlismas faced Helen Peralta at Invicta FC 29: Kaufman vs. Lehner, losing her bout via unanimous decision. Then at EFC 74, Vlismas defeated Karolina Wójcik via split decision, before she went on to defeat Canadian Lindsey Garbatt at BTC 6 Night of Champions via unanimous decision.

In her second appearance with Legacy Fighting Alliance at LFA 78, Vlismas faced Rebecca Adney and defeated her via unanimous decision.

Vlismas was invited to Dana White's Contender Series 30 on August 25, 2020 and faced Hilarie Rose. She won the bout via unanimous decision, getting a UFC contract in the process.

=== Ultimate Fighting Championship ===
Vlismas was scheduled to face Kay Hansen on March 20, 2021 at UFC on ESPN: Brunson vs. Holland. However, Hansen pulled out due to undisclosed reasons and was replaced on March 12 by promotional newcomer Montserrat Ruiz. She lost the bout via unanimous decision, getting kept in a headlock position for most of the bout.

Vlismas faced Gloria de Paula on July 31, 2021 at UFC on ESPN: Hall vs. Strickland. She won the bout in the first round after head kicking de Paula after she was getting up and finished her with ground and pound. This fight earned her the Performance of the Night award.

Vlismas was scheduled to face Loma Lookboonmee on November 20, 2021 at UFC Fight Night 198. However, Vlismas withdrew from the bout for undisclosed reasons and she was replaced by Lupita Godinez.

Vlismas faced Mallory Martin, replacing Montserrat Ruiz, on December 4, 2021 at UFC on ESPN 31. Vlismas won the fight via unanimous decision. This fight earned her the Fight of the Night award.

Vlismas was scheduled to face Tabatha Ricci on October 1, 2022 at UFC Fight Night 211. Vlismas pulled out in late August for personal reasons and was replaced by former UFC Women's Strawweight Championship challenger and inaugural Invicta FC Atomweight Champion Jessica Penne.

Vlismas faced Cory McKenna on December 17, 2022 at UFC Fight Night 216. She lost the fight via unanimous decision.

On June 24, 2025, Vlismas announced her retirement from mixed martial arts competition.

== Championships and accomplishments ==
- Ultimate Fighting Championship
  - Performance of the Night (One time) vs. Gloria de Paula
  - Fight of the Night (One time) vs. Mallory Martin
- BTC Fight Promotions
  - Interim BTC Strawweight Championship (One time)

== Mixed martial arts record ==
Professional record breakdown
10 matches	7 wins	3 losses
By knockout	2	0
By decision	5	3

Res.	Record	Opponent	Method	Event	Date	Round	Time	Location	Notes
Loss	7–3	Cory McKenna	Decision (unanimous)	UFC Fight Night: Cannonier vs. Strickland	December 17, 2022	3	5:00	Las Vegas, Nevada, United States	
Win	7–2	Mallory Martin	Decision (unanimous)	UFC on ESPN: Font vs. Aldo	December 4, 2021	3	5:00	Las Vegas, Nevada, United States	Fight of the Night.
Win	6–2	Gloria de Paula	TKO (head kick and punches)	UFC on ESPN: Hall vs. Strickland	July 31, 2021	1	1:00	Las Vegas, Nevada, United States	Performance of the Night.
Loss	5–2	Montserrat Ruiz	Decision (unanimous)	UFC on ESPN: Brunson vs. Holland	March 20, 2021	3	5:00	Las Vegas, Nevada, United States	
Win	5–1	Hilarie Rose	Decision (unanimous)	Dana White's Contender Series 30	August 25, 2020	3	5:00	Las Vegas, Nevada, United States	
Win	4–1	Rebecca Adney	Decision (unanimous)	LFA 78	November 15, 2019	3	5:00	Belton, Texas, United States	
Win	3–1	Lindsay Garbatt	Decision (unanimous)	BTC 6: Night of Champions	June 1, 2019	3	5:00	Burlington, Ontario, Canada	Won the Interim BTC Strawweight Championship.
Win	2–1	Karolina Wójcik	Decision (split)	EFC Worldwide 74	October 6, 2018	3	5:00	Johannesburg, South Africa	
Loss	1–1	Helen Peralta	Decision (unanimous)	Invicta FC 29: Kaufman vs. Lehner	May 4, 2018	3	5:00	Kansas City, Missouri, United States	
Win	1–0	Karla Hernandez	TKO (elbows)	LFA 35	March 9, 2018	3	4:22	Houston, Texas, United States	

== See also ==
- List of female mixed martial artists
