= UFC Fight Night: Rozenstruik vs. Gane =

2021 mixed martial arts event

- The poster for UFC Fight Night: Rozenstruik vs. Gane
- Promotion: Ultimate Fighting Championship
- Date: February 27, 2021
- Venue: UFC Apex
- City: Enterprise, Nevada, United States
- Attendance: None (behind closed doors)

Event chronology
UFC Fight Night: Blaydes vs. Lewis	UFC Fight Night: Rozenstruik vs. Gane	UFC 259: Błachowicz vs. Adesanya

UFC Fight Night: Rozenstruik vs. Gane (also known as UFC Fight Night 186, UFC on ESPN+ 44 and UFC Vegas 20) was a mixed martial arts event produced by the Ultimate Fighting Championship that took place on February 27, 2021, at the UFC Apex facility in Enterprise, Nevada, part of the Las Vegas Metropolitan Area, United States.

== Background ==
A light heavyweight bout between former UFC Light Heavyweight Championship challenger Dominick Reyes and former Rizin Light Heavyweight Champion Jiří Procházka was expected to serve as the event headliner. However, it was announced in late January that Reyes had been forced from the contest with an injury. Subsequently, Procházka was also removed from the card and the pairing is expected to be left intact and scheduled for UFC on ESPN: Reyes vs. Procházka. As a result, a heavyweight bout between Jairzinho Rozenstruik and Ciryl Gane (originally scheduled for UFC Fight Night: Edwards vs. Muhammad two weeks later) served as the main event.

Raphael Assunção was expected to face Raoni Barcelos in a bantamweight bout at the event. However, Assunção pulled out of the fight in early February after testing positive for COVID-19. He was replaced by promotional newcomer Marcelo Rojo and the bout was expected to take place at a catchweight of 140 pounds. Subsequently, Barcelos was removed from the fight on February 22 after also testing positive. Promotion officials decided to book Rojo as a replacement against Charles Jourdain at UFC Fight Night: Edwards vs. Muhammad.

A featherweight bout between Alex Caceres and Kevin Croom took place at this event. They were briefly linked to a fight at UFC Fight Night: Smith vs. Rakić, but Croom was forced to withdraw from the contest.

A women's bantamweight bout between Marion Reneau and The Ultimate Fighter: Heavy Hitters women's featherweight winner Macy Chiasson was originally scheduled for UFC Fight Night: Overeem vs. Volkov. However, during the week leading up to the fight, Reneau was pulled from the card after testing positive for COVID-19. The bout was expected to remain intact and was rescheduled for this event. They were once again rescheduled on February 20, due to Chiasson suffering an injury, with the pairing now expected to take place at UFC on ESPN: Brunson vs. Holland.

Hannah Cifers was expected to face Emily Whitmire in a women's strawweight bout at this event. However, Cifers pulled out due to undisclosed reasons and was replaced by Sam Hughes. In turn, Whitmire was removed from the bout on February 14 due to undisclosed reasons and the pairing was scrapped.

A bantamweight rematch featuring Pedro Munhoz and Jimmie Rivera took place at this event. They previously met at UFC Fight Night: Belfort vs. Henderson 3 in November 2015, when Rivera won via split decision. They were originally booked for a planned January 30 date, but the event never materialized. The pairing was then rescheduled for UFC on ESPN: Chiesa vs. Magny, before being moved once more, as they were booked to UFC 258 due to undisclosed reasons. The bout was then delayed again due to a positive COVID-19 test for someone within the two camps during the week leading up to that event.

Randy Brown was expected to face Alex Oliveira in a welterweight bout at the event. However, Brown pulled out of the fight during the week leading up to the event due to undisclosed reasons. Oliveira was then expected to face promotional newcomer Ramazan Kuramagomedov. However, the bout was scrapped the day before the event when Kuramagomedov was removed due to illness.

A light heavyweight bout between Alonzo Menifield and William Knight was scheduled for the preliminary portion of the card. However, the bout was postponed during the week leading up to the event after Menifield tested positive for COVID-19. The pairing is expected to be left intact and rescheduled for a future event.

At the weigh-ins, Maxim Grishin weighed in at 210.5 pounds, four and a half pounds over the light heavyweight non-title fight limit. His bout proceeded at a catchweight and he was fined 30% of his individual purse, which went to his opponent Dustin Jacoby.

A women's strawweight rematch between former Invicta FC Strawweight Champion Angela Hill and Ashley Yoder was a late addition to this event. The two met before at The Ultimate Fighter: Redemption Finale in July 2017, with Hill winning via unanimous decision. The bout was postponed on the day of the event, as it was announced that one of Yoder's cornermen tested positive for COVID-19. The bout was rescheduled for UFC Fight Night: Edwards vs. Muhammad.

== Results ==
Main card (ESPN+)
Weight class				Method	Round	Time	Notes
Heavyweight	Ciryl Gane	def.	Jairzinho Rozenstruik	Decision (unanimous) (50–45, 50–45, 50–45)	5	5:00
Light Heavyweight	Magomed Ankalaev	def.	Nikita Krylov	Decision (unanimous) (29–28, 29–28, 29–28)	3	5:00
Women's Flyweight	Mayra Bueno Silva	vs.	Montana De La Rosa	Draw (majority) (28–27, 28–28, 28–28)	3	5:00	(Note: Bueno Silva was deducted one point in round 1 for grabbing the cage.)
Bantamweight	Pedro Munhoz	def.	Jimmie Rivera	Decision (unanimous) (30–27, 30–27, 29–28)	3	5:00
Featherweight	Alex Caceres	def.	Kevin Croom	Decision (unanimous) (30–26, 30–26, 30–27)	3	5:00
Preliminary card (ESPN+)
Lightweight	Thiago Moisés	def.	Alexander Hernandez	Decision (unanimous) (30–27, 30–27, 29–28)	3	5:00
Women's Bantamweight	Alexis Davis	def.	Sabina Mazo	Decision (unanimous) (30–27, 30–27, 30–26)	3	5:00
Bantamweight	Ronnie Lawrence	def.	Vince Cachero	TKO (punches)	3	2:38
Catchweight (210.5 lb)	Dustin Jacoby	def.	Maxim Grishin	Decision (unanimous) (29–28, 29–28, 29–28)	3	5:00

== Bonus awards ==
The following fighters received $50,000 bonuses.

- Fight of the Night: Pedro Munhoz vs. Jimmie Rivera
- Performance of the Night: Ronnie Lawrence

== See also ==
- List of UFC events
- List of current UFC fighters
- 2021 in UFC
