= UFC Fight Night: Jacaré vs. Hermansson =

UFC mixed martial arts event in 2019

- The poster for UFC Fight Night: Jacaré vs. Hermansson
- Promotion: Ultimate Fighting Championship
- Date: April 27, 2019
- Venue: BB&T Center
- City: Sunrise, Florida
- Attendance: 12,754
- Total gate: $1,209,654.09

Event chronology
UFC Fight Night: Overeem vs. Oleinik	UFC Fight Night: Jacaré vs. Hermansson	UFC Fight Night: Iaquinta vs. Cowboy

UFC Fight Night: Jacaré vs. Hermansson (also known as UFC Fight Night 150 or UFC on ESPN+ 8) was a mixed martial arts event produced by the Ultimate Fighting Championship held on April 27, 2019, at the BB&T Center in Sunrise, Florida.

== Background ==
The event was expected to take place at the American Airlines Arena in Miami, Florida. However, the UFC announced on February 23 that the event was moved to the BB&T Center in Sunrise, Florida, being the second to be held there, after UFC on FX: Johnson vs. McCall in June 2012. Also, this event was scheduled to be broadcast on ESPN. However, it was announced at the end of the UFC 236 broadcast that this event would instead be on ESPN+.

The promotion was initially targeting a middleweight bout between former interim UFC Middleweight Championship challenger (as well as 2000 Olympic silver medalist and former world champion in freestyle wrestling) Yoel Romero and Paulo Costa to serve as the event headliner. The pairing was previously scheduled to take place at UFC 230 and then again at UFC Fight Night: Cejudo vs. Dillashaw, but it was scrapped each time due to injuries to both fighters. However, on March 7, the promotion elected to replace Costa and arrange a rematch between Romero and former Strikeforce Middleweight Champion Ronaldo Souza to serve as the event headliner. The two met previously in December 2015 at UFC 194 with Romero winning via split decision. It was then reported in early April that Romero pulled out of the bout due to pneumonia. While not officially announced by the promotion, Costa was initially expected to replace Romero. However, Costa indicated that the three week lead time would not be enough for him to adequately prepare, so he declined. Souza ultimately faced Jack Hermansson in the main event.

A light heavyweight bout between former UFC Light Heavyweight Championship challenger Glover Teixeira and Ion Cuțelaba was initially scheduled to take place at UFC Fight Night: Cejudo vs. Dillashaw. However, on January 10, Cuțelaba pulled out of the bout due to injury. The pairing was rescheduled for this event.

A bantamweight bout between John Lineker and Cory Sandhagen was initially scheduled to take place at UFC Fight Night: Cejudo vs. Dillashaw. However, on January 10, Lineker pulled out of the bout due to a rib injury. The pairing was rescheduled for this event.

A strawweight bout between former Invicta FC Atomweight Champion (also former UFC Women's Strawweight Championship challenger) Jessica Penne and Jodie Esquibel was initially scheduled to take place at UFC on ESPN: Ngannou vs. Velasquez. However, Penne pulled out of the bout due to a severely sprained ankle while warming up the morning of the event, resulting in the cancellation of the bout. The pairing was rescheduled for this event. Subsequently, on April 18, it was reported that Penne pulled out of the bout and she was replaced by former Invicta FC Strawweight Champion Angela Hill.

A welterweight bout between Alex Oliveira and Li Jingliang was scheduled at this event. However, it was reported on March 23 that Li was injured and was forced to pull out of the bout. He was replaced by Mike Perry.

A strawweight bout between former Invicta FC and UFC Strawweight Champion Carla Esparza and another former Invicta FC Strawweight Champion Lívia Renata Souza was scheduled for the event. However, it was reported that Souza pulled out of the bout citing an ankle injury and she was replaced by current Invicta FC Strawweight Champion Virna Jandiroba.

A lightweight bout between Gilbert Burns and Eric Wisely was scheduled for the event. However, it was reported on April 18 that Wisely pulled out of the bout, citing injury. He was replaced by newcomer Mike Davis.

== Results ==
Main card (ESPN+)
Weight class				Method	Round	Time	Notes
Middleweight	Jack Hermansson	def.	Ronaldo Souza	Decision (unanimous) (49–45, 48–47, 48–47)	5	5:00
Heavyweight	Greg Hardy	def.	Dmitry Smolyakov	TKO (punches)	1	2:15
Welterweight	Mike Perry	def.	Alex Oliveira	Decision (unanimous) (29–28, 29–28, 29–28)	3	5:00
Light Heavyweight	Glover Teixeira	def.	Ion Cuțelaba	Submission (rear-naked choke)	2	3:37
Bantamweight	Cory Sandhagen	def.	John Lineker	Decision (split) (28–29, 29–28, 29–28)	3	5:00
Lightweight	Roosevelt Roberts	def.	Thomas Gifford	Decision (unanimous) (30–27, 30–27, 30–27)	3	5:00
Preliminary card (ESPN)
Welterweight	Takashi Sato	def.	Ben Saunders	TKO (elbows and punches)	2	1:18
Heavyweight	Augusto Sakai	def.	Andrei Arlovski	Decision (split) (28–29, 29–28, 29–28)	3	5:00
Women's Strawweight	Carla Esparza	def.	Virna Jandiroba	Decision (unanimous) (30–27, 29–28, 29–28)	3	5:00
Lightweight	Gilbert Burns	def.	Mike Davis	Submission (rear-naked choke)	2	4:15
Early Preliminary card (ESPN2)
Lightweight	Jim Miller	def.	Jason Gonzalez	Submission (rear-naked choke)	1	2:12
Women's Strawweight	Angela Hill	def.	Jodie Esquibel	Decision (unanimous) (29–28, 30–27, 30–27)	3	5:00
Welterweight	Dhiego Lima	def.	Court McGee	Decision (split) (30–27, 28–29, 29–28)	3	5:00

== Bonus awards ==
The following fighters received $50,000 bonuses:

- Fight of the Night: Mike Perry vs. Alex Oliveira
- Performance of the Night: Glover Teixeira and Jim Miller

== Reported payout ==
The following is the reported payout to the fighters as reported to the Florida State Boxing Commission. It does not include sponsor money and also does not include the UFC's traditional "fight night" bonuses. The total disclosed payout for the event was $1,173,000.

- Jack Hermansson: $82,000 (includes $41,000 win bonus) def. Ronaldo Souza: $210,000
- Greg Hardy: $150,000 (includes $75,000 win bonus) def. Dmitrii Smoliakov: $10,000
- Mike Perry: $110,000 (includes $55,000 win bonus) def. Alex Oliveira: $64,000
- Glover Teixeira: $210,000 (includes $105,000 win bonus) def. Ion Cuțelaba: $22,000
- Cory Sandhagen: $66,000 (includes $33,000 win bonus) def. John Lineker: $49,000
- Roosevelt Roberts: $24,000 (includes $12,000 win bonus) def. Thomas Gifford: $10,000
- Takashi Sato: $24,000 (includes $12,000 win bonus) def. Ben Saunders: $35,000
- Augusto Sakai: $24,000 (includes $12,000 win bonus) def. Andrei Arlovski: $300,000
- Carla Esparza: $90,000 (includes $45,000 win bonus) def. Virna Jandiroba: $12,000
- Gilbert Burns: $88,000 (includes $44,000 win bonus) def. Mike Davis: $10,000
- Jim Miller: $180,000 (includes $90,000 win bonus) def. Jason Gonzalez: $12,000
- Angela Hill: $48,000 (includes $24,000 win bonus) def. Jodie Esquibel: $10,000
- Dhiego Lima: $34,000 (includes $17,000 win bonus) def. Court McGee: $48,000

== See also ==
- List of UFC events
- 2019 in UFC
- List of current UFC fighters
