= Mallory Martin =

American mixed martial artist

- Born: January 29, 1994 (age 32); Denver, Colorado, U.S.
- Height: 5 ft 4 in (1.63 m)
- Weight: 115 lb (52 kg; 8.2 st)
- Division: Strawweight
- Reach: 63 in (160 cm)
- Fighting out of: Denver, Colorado, United States
- Team: Zingano BJJ; Tiger Muay Thai (2016–); Tao of Boxing; Elevation Fight Team (2020–present)
- Rank: Brown belt in Brazilian Jiu-Jitsu under Matt Simms
- Years active: 2016–present

Mixed martial arts record
- Total: 16
- Wins: 10
- By knockout: 2
- By submission: 2
- By decision: 6
- Losses: 6
- By submission: 2
- By decision: 4

Other information
- Mixed martial arts record from Sherdog

Mallory Martin (born January 29, 1994) is an American mixed martial artist who competes in the Strawweight division. Martin also competed in the Ultimate Fighting Championship (UFC) and Invicta Fighting Championships (Invicta).

== Mixed martial arts career ==
=== Early career ===
Martin started her professional mixed martial arts career in 2016 at Kunlun Fight MMA 7 in China prior to joining Invicta Fighting Championships.

=== Invicta Fighting Championships ===
Martin made her promotional debut on March 25, 2017, at Invicta FC 22: Evinger vs. Kunitskaya II against Sunna Davíðsdóttir. She lost the fight via unanimous decision.

=== Legacy Fighting Alliance ===
Martin faced Maycee Barber on September 8, 2017, at LFA 22 - Heinisch vs. Perez. She lost the fight by unanimous decision.

=== Return to Invicta Fighting Championships ===
Martin second fight in Invicta was on January 13, 2018, at Invicta FC 27: Kaufman vs. Kianzad. She faced Tiffany Masters and she won the fight via technical knockout in the second round.

=== Return to Legacy Fighting Alliance ===
On April 27, 2018, Martin faced Linsey Williams at LFA 38. She won the fight by submission in round two.

=== Second return to Invicta Fighting Championships ===
Martin returned to Invicta and faced Ashley Nichols on September 1, 2018, at Invicta FC 31: Jandiroba vs. Morandin.

At the weigh-ins, Mallory Martin weighed in at 117 pounds, one pound over the strawweight non-title fight limit of 116 pounds. Her bout proceeded at catchweight and she was fined 25 percent of her purse which went to her opponent Nichols. She won the fight via a technical knockout in round three.

=== Ultimate Fighting Championship ===
Martin was signed by UFC in December 2019.

Martin faced Virna Jandiroba, replacing injured Lívia Renata Souza on December 7, 2019, at UFC on ESPN 7. She lost the fight via submission in the second round.

Martin faced Hannah Cifers on August 29, 2020, at UFC Fight Night 175. The bout was held at catchweight after Cifers missed weight with 20 percent of her purse going to Martin. Despite getting knocked down in the first round, Martin won the fight via a rear-naked choke in round two. This win earned her the Performance of the Night award.

Martin faced Polyana Viana on February 13, 2021, at UFC 258. She lost the fight via an armbar in round two.

Martin was scheduled to face Montserrat Ruiz on December 4, 2021, at UFC on ESPN 31. However Ruiz was forced out of the event and she was replaced by Cheyanne Buys. Martin lost the fight via unanimous decision. This fight earned her the Fight of the Night award.

After fighting out her contract with her last bout, she didn't re-sign with the UFC.

=== Post UFC ===
Martin faced Katharina Dalisda on October 15, 2022 at Oktagon 36. She lost the bout via unanimous decision.

Martin faced Magdaléna Šormová on December 29, 2023 at Oktagon 51, winning the bout via split decision.

Martin faced Anita Bekus on May 4, 2024 at Oktagon 57, winning the bout via unanimous decision.

== Championships and accomplishments ==
- Ultimate Fighting Championship
  - Performance of the Night (One time) vs. Hannah Cifers
  - Fight of the Night (One time) vs. Cheyanne Buys

== Mixed martial arts record ==
Professional record breakdown
17 matches	11 wins	6 losses
By knockout	2	0
By submission	2	2
By decision	7	4

Res.	Record	Opponent	Method	Event	Date	Round	Time	Location	Notes
Win	11–6	Eva Dourthe	Decision (unanimous)	Oktagon 70	April 26, 2025	5	5:00	Karlovy Vary, Czech Republic	Defended the Oktagon Women's Strawweight Championship.
Win	10–6	Katharina Dalisda	Decision (unanimous)	Oktagon 62	October 12, 2024	5	5:00	Frankfurt, Germany	Won the Oktagon Women's Strawweight Championship. Performance of the Night.
Win	9–6	Anita Bekus	Decision (unanimous)	Oktagon 57	May 4, 2024	3	5:00	Frankfurt, Germany	
Win	8–6	Magdaléna Šormová	Decision (split)	Oktagon 51	December 29, 2023	3	5:00	Prague, Czech Republic	Catchweight (121 lb) bout.
Loss	7–6	Katharina Dalisda	Decision (unanimous)	Oktagon 36	October 15, 2022	3	5:00	Frankfurt, Germany	
Loss	7–5	Cheyanne Vlismas	Decision (unanimous)	UFC on ESPN: Font vs. Aldo	December 4, 2021	3	5:00	Las Vegas, Nevada, United States	Fight of the Night.
Loss	7–4	Polyana Viana	Submission (armbar)	UFC 258	February 13, 2021	1	3:18	Las Vegas, Nevada, United States	
Win	7–3	Hannah Cifers	Submission (rear-naked choke)	UFC Fight Night: Smith vs. Rakić	August 29, 2020	2	1:33	Las Vegas, Nevada, United States	Catchweight (117 lb) bout; Cifers missed weight. Performance of the Night.
Loss	6–3	Virna Jandiroba	Submission (rear-naked choke)	UFC on ESPN: Overeem vs. Rozenstruik	December 7, 2019	2	1:16	Washington, D.C., United States	
Win	6–2	Cynthia Arceo	Decision (unanimous)	Invicta FC 38: Murato vs. Ducote	November 1, 2019	3	5:00	Kansas City, Kansas, United States	
Win	5–2	Micol Di Segni	Decision (unanimous)	Dana White's Contender Series 25	August 20, 2019	3	5:00	Las Vegas, Nevada, United States	
Win	4–2	Ashley Nichols	TKO (elbows)	Invicta FC 31: Jandiroba vs. Morandin	September 1, 2018	3	1:05	Kansas City, Missouri, United States	
Win	3–2	Linsey Williams	Submission (rear-naked choke)	LFA 38	April 27, 2018	2	3:18	Minneapolis, Minnesota, United States	
Win	2–2	Tiffany Masters	TKO (punches)	Invicta FC 27: Kaufman vs. Kianzad	January 8, 2018	2	3:36	Kansas City, Missouri, United States	
Loss	1–2	Maycee Barber	Decision (unanimous)	LFA 22	September 8, 2017	3	5:00	Broomfield, Colorado, United States	
Loss	1–1	Sunna Davíðsdóttir	Decision (unanimous)	Invicta FC 22: Evinger vs. Kunitskaya II	March 25, 2017	3	5:00	Kansas City, Missouri, United States	Strawweight debut. Fight of the Night.
Win	1–0	Heqin Lin	Decision (unanimous)	Kunlun Fight MMA 7	December 15, 2016	3	5:00	Beijing, China	Flyweight debut.

== See also ==
- List of female mixed martial artists
