= Virna Jandiroba =

Brazilian mixed martial artist

- Born: Virna Carole Andrade Jandiroba; May 30, 1988 (age 38); Serrinha, Bahia, Brazil
- Other names: Carcará
- Height: 5 ft 3 in (1.60 m)
- Weight: 115 lb (52 kg; 8 st 3 lb)
- Division: Strawweight
- Reach: 64 in (163 cm)
- Fighting out of: Feira de Santana, Bahia, Brazil
- Team: Team Velame; Academia Fight House
- Trainer: Luiz Dórea
- Rank: Black belt in Brazilian Jiu-Jitsu; Green/white prajied in Muay Thai
- Years active: 2013–present

Mixed martial arts record
- Total: 28
- Wins: 23
- By knockout: 1
- By submission: 14
- By decision: 8
- Losses: 5
- By decision: 5

Other information
- Mixed martial arts record from Sherdog

Virna Carole Andrade Jandiroba (born May 30, 1988) is a Brazilian mixed martial artist who competed in the women's Strawweight division of the Ultimate Fighting Championship (UFC). She is a former Invicta Fighting Championships (Invicta) Strawweight champion. As of November 7, 2026, she is #3 in the Meta UFC women's strawweight rankings and as of November 17, 2026, she is #13 in the UFC women's pound-for-pound rankings.

== Background ==
Jandiroba started training in kung fu when she was a child. She later turned to Judo and Brazilian jiu-jitsu. She transitioned and competed in mixed martial arts after she earned her Brazilian jiu-jitsu black belt.

== Mixed martial arts career ==
=== Early career ===
Jandiroba started her professional MMA career in 2013 and fought primarily in Brazil. She amassed a record of 11–0 prior to signing for Invicta.

=== Invicta Fighting Championships ===
Jandiroba made her Invicta debut on December 8, 2017, at Invicta FC 26: Maia vs. Niedwiedz against Amy Montenegro. She won the fight, tapping out Montenegro via first-round armbar.

Jandiroba was scheduled to face Janaisa Morandin on March 24, 2018, at Invicta FC 28: Mizuki vs. Jandiroba for the Invicta strawweight championship. However, Morandin was forced to pulled out due to a tooth infection and she was replaced by Mizuki Inoue. She won the fight via a split decision with the scoreboard of (49-46, 46-49, 49-46) and crowned Invicta FC Strawweight Champion.

On September 1, 2018, Jandiroba made her first title defense at Invicta FC 31: Jandiroba vs. Morandin against Janaisa Morandin. She submitted Morandin in the second round and retained the Invicta FC Strawweight Championship title.

=== Ultimate Fighting Championship ===
In her UFC debut, Jandiroba replaced an injured Lívia Renata Souza against Carla Esparza on April 27, 2019, at UFC Fight Night 150. She lost the fight by unanimous decision.

While the Esparza fight did not go Jandiroba's way, Jandiroba believes that fight, her first professional loss, was responsible for the subsequent growth and wins she has notched in the UFC.

Jandiroba was expected to face Cortney Casey on December 7, 2019, at UFC on ESPN 7. However, Casey withdrew from the event for an undisclosed reason and she was replaced by Lívia Renata Souza. In turn Souza withdrew from the bout due to a back injury and she was replaced by Mallory Martin Jandiroba won the fight via submission in the second round.

Jandiroba faced Felice Herrig on August 15, 2020, at UFC 252. She won the fight via an armbar submission in the first round. This win earned her the Performance of the Night award.

Jandiroba faced Mackenzie Dern on December 12, 2020, at UFC 256. She lost the fight by unanimous decision.

Jandiroba faced Kanako Murata on June 19, 2021, at UFC on ESPN 25. She won the bout after the doctor stopped the fight after round 2 due to an elbow dislocation caused by armbar applied by Jandiroba.

Jandiroba faced Amanda Ribas on October 30, 2021, at UFC 267. She lost the bout via unanimous decision.

Jandiroba faced Angela Hill on May 14, 2022, at UFC on ESPN 36. She won the bout via unanimous decision.

Jandiroba faced Marina Rodriguez on May 6, 2023, at UFC 288. She won the fight by unanimous decision.

Jandiroba was scheduled to face Tatiana Suarez on August 5, 2023, at UFC on ESPN 50. However in June it was announced that Jandiroba had suffered an injury requiring knee surgery, and was replaced by Jéssica Andrade.

Jandiroba faced Loopy Godínez on March 30, 2024, at UFC on ESPN 54. She won the fight via unanimous decision.

Jandiroba faced Amanda Lemos on July 20, 2024, at UFC on ESPN 60. She won the fight by an armbar submission in the second round. This fight earned her another Performance of the Night award.

Jandiroba was scheduled to face Tatiana Suarez on December 7, 2024 at UFC 310. However, Suarez reportedly withdrew from the fight due to an unspecified health issue and the bout was subsequently removed from the card.

Jandiroba faced Yan Xiaonan on April 12, 2025 at UFC 314. She won the fight by unanimous decision.

Jandiroba faced Mackenzie Dern in a rematch for the vacant UFC Women's Strawweight Championship on October 25, 2025, at UFC 321. She lost the bout via unanimous decision.

Jandiroba faced Tabatha Ricci on April 4, 2026 at UFC Fight Night 272. She won the fight via unanimous decision.

Jandiroba faced Tatiana Suarez on November 7, 2026 at UFC Fight Night 293. She lost the fight by unanimous decision.

On November 18, 2026, following her loss to Suarez, it was reported that Jandiroba was removed from the UFC roster.

== Championships and accomplishments ==
=== Mixed martial arts ===
- Ultimate Fighting Championship
  - Performance of the Night (Two times) vs. Felice Herrig and Amanda Lemos
  - Tied (Mackenzie Dern & Jaqueline Amorim) for most submission attempts in UFC Women's Strawweight division history (17)
  - Most control time in UFC Women's Strawweight division history (1:14:58)
  - Most top-position time in UFC Women's Strawweight division history (1:01:59)
  - Third highest control time percentage in UFC Women's Strawweight division history (43.3%)
  - Third most takedowns landed in UFC Women's Strawweight division history (37)
  - Fourth highest top-position percentage in UFC Women's Strawweight division history (33.0%)
  - Fifth highest takedown defense percentage in UFC Women's Strawweight division history (78.0%)
  - Sixth most submissions-per-fifteen minutes in UFC Women's Strawweight division history (1.36)
- Invicta Fighting Championships
  - Invicta Fighting Championships Strawweight Champion
    - One title defense (vs. Janaisa Morandin)
  - Performance of the Night (Two times) vs. Amy Montenegro and Janaisa Morandin
- MMA Fighting
  - 2024 Third Team MMA All-Star

== Mixed martial arts record ==
Professional record breakdown
28 matches	23 wins	5 losses
By knockout	1	0
By submission	14	0
By decision	8	5

Res.	Record	Opponent	Method	Event	Date	Round	Time	Location	Notes
Loss	23–5	Tatiana Suarez	Decision (unanimous)	UFC Fight Night: Cortes-Acosta vs. Walker	November 7, 2026	3	5:00	Las Vegas, Nevada, United States	
Win	23–4	Tabatha Ricci	Decision (unanimous)	UFC Fight Night: Moicano vs. Duncan	April 4, 2026	3	5:00	Las Vegas, Nevada, United States	
Loss	22–4	Mackenzie Dern	Decision (unanimous)	UFC 321	October 25, 2025	5	5:00	Abu Dhabi, United Arab Emirates	For the vacant UFC Women's Strawweight Championship.
Win	22–3	Yan Xiaonan	Decision (unanimous)	UFC 314	April 12, 2025	3	5:00	Miami, Florida, United States	
Win	21–3	Amanda Lemos	Submission (armbar)	UFC on ESPN: Lemos vs. Jandiroba	July 20, 2024	2	4:48	Las Vegas, Nevada, United States	Performance of the Night.
Win	20–3	Loopy Godínez	Decision (unanimous)	UFC on ESPN: Blanchfield vs. Fiorot	March 30, 2024	3	5:00	Atlantic City, New Jersey, United States	
Win	19–3	Marina Rodriguez	Decision (unanimous)	UFC 288	May 6, 2023	3	5:00	Newark, New Jersey, United States	
Win	18–3	Angela Hill	Decision (unanimous)	UFC on ESPN: Błachowicz vs. Rakić	May 14, 2022	3	5:00	Las Vegas, Nevada, United States	
Loss	17–3	Amanda Ribas	Decision (unanimous)	UFC 267	October 30, 2021	3	5:00	Abu Dhabi, United Arab Emirates	
Win	17–2	Kanako Murata	TKO (arm injury)	UFC on ESPN: The Korean Zombie vs. Ige	June 19, 2021	2	5:00	Las Vegas, Nevada, United States	
Loss	16–2	Mackenzie Dern	Decision (unanimous)	UFC 256	December 12, 2020	3	5:00	Las Vegas, Nevada, United States	
Win	16–1	Felice Herrig	Submission (armbar)	UFC 252	August 15, 2020	1	1:44	Las Vegas, Nevada, United States	Performance of the Night.
Win	15–1	Mallory Martin	Submission (rear-naked choke)	UFC on ESPN: Overeem vs. Rozenstruik	December 7, 2019	2	1:16	Washington, D.C., United States	
Loss	14–1	Carla Esparza	Decision (unanimous)	UFC Fight Night: Jacaré vs. Hermansson	April 27, 2019	3	5:00	Sunrise, Florida, United States	
Win	14–0	Janaisa Morandin	Submission (arm-triangle choke)	Invicta FC 31	September 1, 2018	2	2:23	Kansas City, Missouri, United States	Defended the Invicta FC Strawweight Championship. Performance of the Night.
Win	13–0	Mizuki Inoue	Decision (split)	Invicta FC 28	March 24, 2018	5	5:00	Salt Lake City, Utah, United States	Won the vacant Invicta FC Strawweight Championship.
Win	12–0	Amy Montenegro	Submission (armbar)	Invicta FC 26	December 8, 2017	1	2:50	Kansas City, Missouri, United States	Performance of the Night.
Win	11–0	Ericka Almeida	Decision (split)	Fight2Night 2	April 28, 2017	3	5:00	Foz do Iguaçu, Brazil	
Win	10–0	Suiane Teixeira dos Santos	Submission (armbar)	Imperium MMA Pro 12	November 26, 2016	1	0:46	Serrinha, Brazil	Catchweight (137 lb) bout.
Win	9–0	Lisa Ellis	Submission (rear-naked choke)	Fight2Night 1	November 4, 2016	1	2:21	Rio de Janeiro, Brazil	
Win	8–0	Cristiane Lima Silva	Submission (rear-naked choke)	Fight On 3	July 30, 2016	1	2:34	Salvador, Brazil	
Win	7–0	Anne Karoline Nascimento	Submission (armbar)	Circuito MNA de MMA 2	April 9, 2016	2	3:29	Seabra, Brazil	Won the vacant Circuito MNA de MMA Strawweight Championship.
Win	6–0	Aline Sattelmayer	Decision (unanimous)	O Rei da Arena Fight 2	November 14, 2015	3	5:00	Alagoinhas, Brazil	Return to Strawweight.
Win	5–0	Cristiane Lima Silva	Submission (rear-naked choke)	Velame Fight Combat 4	September 12, 2015	1	2:53	Feira de Santana, Brazil	Catchweight (121 lb) bout.
Win	4–0	Carla Ramos	Submission (triangle choke)	Banzay Fight Championship 2	May 16, 2015	1	1:50	Candeias, Brazil	Flyweight bout.
Win	3–0	Camila Lima	Submission (rear-naked choke)	MMA Super Heroes 7	November 15, 2014	2	4:30	São Paulo, Brazil	Strawweight debut.
Win	2–0	Gina Brito Silva Santana	Submission (rear-naked choke)	The Iron Fight 2	December 21, 2013	3	N/A	Euclides da Cunha, Brazil	
Win	1–0	Joana Santana	Submission (rear-naked choke)	Premier Fight League 10	June 15, 2013	1	0:41	Serrinha, Brazil	Flyweight debut.

== See also ==
- List of female mixed martial artists

Awards and achievements
Preceded by Angela Hill	5th Invicta FC Strawweight Champion; March 24, 2018 – April 7, 2019	Succeeded by Brianna Van Buren
