= UFC on ESPN: Overeem vs. Rozenstruik =

UFC mixed martial arts event in 2019

- The poster for UFC on ESPN: Overeem vs. Rozenstruik
- Promotion: Ultimate Fighting Championship
- Date: December 7, 2019
- Venue: Capital One Arena
- City: Washington, D.C., United States
- Attendance: 10,816

Event chronology
UFC Fight Night: Błachowicz vs. Jacaré	UFC on ESPN: Overeem vs. Rozenstruik	UFC 245: Usman vs. Covington

UFC on ESPN: Overeem vs. Rozenstruik (also known as UFC on ESPN 7) was a mixed martial arts event produced by the Ultimate Fighting Championship that took place on December 7, 2019 at Capital One Arena in Washington, D.C., United States.

== Background ==
The event was the second that the promotion had contested in the American capital, following UFC Live: Cruz vs. Johnson in October 2011.

The event was also dubbed 'Fight Like Hell Night' and held in honor of the late ESPN broadcaster Stuart Scott, who died from cancer in 2015.

A heavyweight bout between former 2010 K-1 World Grand Prix Champion, Strikeforce Heavyweight Champion and UFC Heavyweight Championship challenger Alistair Overeem and Walt Harris was expected to serve as the event headliner. However on November 1, Harris withdrew from the event due to the ongoing search for his missing stepdaughter, whose remains were found a month after her disappearance. He was replaced by Jairzinho Rozenstruik.

A women's strawweight bout between former UFC Women's Strawweight Championship challenger Cláudia Gadelha and Cynthia Calvillo was scheduled for the event. However on October 22, it was announced that Gadelha was forced to withdraw from the bout due to a broken finger and a torn ligament. She was replaced by Marina Rodriguez.

A women's strawweight bout between Cortney Casey and former Invicta FC Strawweight Champion Virna Jandiroba was scheduled for the event. However, Casey pulled out on October 31 due to undisclosed reasons. She was replaced by another former Invicta FC Strawweight Champion Lívia Renata Souza. In turn, Souza pulled out of the fight a few weeks later and was replaced by promotional newcomer Mallory Martin.

A middleweight bout between Alonzo Menifield and Trevor Smith was scheduled for the event. However on November 10, it was reported that Menifield pulled out of the event for an undisclosed reason and was replaced by Makhmud Muradov.

Mickey Gall was expected to face former WEC Welterweight Champion and interim UFC Welterweight Champion Carlos Condit at the event. However, Condit pulled out on November 13 due to a detached retina and the bout was subsequently canceled.

A featherweight bout between Chris Fishgold and Billy Quarantillo was scheduled for the event. However, Fishgold withdrew from the bout on November 27 for an undisclosed reason. He was replaced by Jacob Kilburn.

At the weigh-ins, Cynthia Calvillo and Matt Sayles missed the required weight for their respective fights. Calvillo weighed in at 120.5 pounds, 4.5 pounds over the strawweight non-title fight limit of 116 pounds. Sayles weighed in at 148.5 pounds, 2.5 pounds over the featherweight non-title fight limit of 146 pounds. Both bouts were held at a catchweight. Calvillo and Sayles were fined 30% and 20% of their purses, which went to their opponents Rodriguez and Mitchell.

== Results ==
Main Card (ESPN)
Weight class				Method	Round	Time	Notes
Heavyweight	Jairzinho Rozenstruik	def.	Alistair Overeem	KO (punch)	5	4:56
Catchweight (120.5 lb)	Marina Rodriguez	vs.	Cynthia Calvillo	Draw (majority) (29–28, 28–28, 28–28)	3	5:00
Heavyweight	Ben Rothwell	def.	Stefan Struve	TKO (punches)	2	4:57	(Note: Rothwell was deducted a point in round 2 due to repeated groin strikes.)
Women's Bantamweight	Aspen Ladd	def.	Yana Kunitskaya	TKO (punches)	3	0:33
Bantamweight	Cody Stamann	vs.	Song Yadong	Draw (majority) (29–27, 28–28, 28–28)	3	5:00	(Note: Yadong was deducted a point in round 1 due to an illegal knee.)
Bantamweight	Rob Font	def.	Ricky Simón	Decision (unanimous) (29–28, 29–28, 30–27)	3	5:00
Preliminary Card (ESPN)
Welterweight	Tim Means	def.	Thiago Alves	Submission (guillotine choke)	1	2:38
Featherweight	Billy Quarantillo	def.	Jacob Kilburn	Submission (triangle choke)	2	3:18
Catchweight (148.5 lb)	Bryce Mitchell	def.	Matt Sayles	Submission (Twister)	1	4:20
Lightweight	Joe Solecki	def.	Matt Wiman	Decision (unanimous) (30–26, 30–26, 30–27)	3	5:00
Early Preliminary Card (ESPN+)
Women's Strawweight	Virna Jandiroba	def.	Mallory Martin	Submission (rear-naked choke)	2	1:16
Middleweight	Makhmud Muradov	def.	Trevor Smith	KO (punch)	3	4:09

== Bonus awards ==
The following fighters received $50,000 bonuses.

- Fight of the Night: Rob Font vs. Ricky Simón
- Performance of the Night: Bryce Mitchell and Makhmud Muradov

== See also ==
- List of UFC events
- 2019 in UFC
- List of current UFC fighters
