= UFC on ESPN: Brunson vs. Holland =

2021 mixed martial arts event

- The poster for UFC on ESPN: Brunson vs. Holland
- Promotion: Ultimate Fighting Championship
- Date: March 20, 2021
- Venue: UFC Apex
- City: Enterprise, Nevada, United States
- Attendance: None (behind closed doors)

Event chronology
UFC Fight Night: Edwards vs. Muhammad	UFC on ESPN: Brunson vs. Holland	UFC 260: Miocic vs. Ngannou 2

UFC on ESPN: Brunson vs. Holland (also known as UFC on ESPN 21 and UFC Vegas 22) was a mixed martial arts event produced by the Ultimate Fighting Championship that took place on March 20, 2021 at the UFC Apex facility in Enterprise, Nevada, part of the Las Vegas Metropolitan Area, United States.

== Background ==
A middleweight bout between Derek Brunson and Kevin Holland served as the event headliner.

A women's bantamweight bout between Marion Reneau and The Ultimate Fighter: Heavy Hitters women's featherweight winner Macy Chiasson was originally scheduled for UFC Fight Night: Overeem vs. Volkov. However, during the week leading up to the fight, Reneau was pulled from the card after testing positive for COVID-19. The bout was expected to remain intact and was rescheduled for UFC Fight Night: Rozenstruik vs. Gane. They were once again rescheduled on February 20, due to Chiasson suffering an injury, with the pairing taking place at this event.

A light heavyweight bout between Paul Craig and Jamahal Hill was expected to place at the event. However on March 10, Hill withdrew from the bout after testing positive for COVID-19. Promotion officials have not confirmed, but the pairing is expected to remain intact and be rescheduled for a future event.

Former KSW Welterweight Champion Dricus du Plessis was expected to face Trevin Giles in a middleweight bout at this event. However, du Plessis pulled out due to visa issues and was replaced by Roman Dolidze.

A women's strawweight bout between Kay Hansen and promotional newcomer Cheyanne Vlismas was scheduled for the event. However, Hansen pulled out due to undisclosed reasons and was replaced on March 12 by promotional newcomer Montserrat Ruiz.

A bantamweight bout between Johnny Eduardo and Anthony Birchak was expected to take place at the event. However on March 15, Eduardo withdrew from the bout due to visa issues and the bout was scrapped.

Don'Tale Mayes was expected to face Tai Tuivasa in a heavyweight bout at the event. However, Mayes was removed from the fight during the week leading up to the event for undisclosed reasons and was replaced by promotional newcomer Harry Hunsucker.

At the weigh-ins, Jesse Strader weighed in at 137.5 pounds, one and a half pounds over the bantamweight non-title fight limit. His bout proceeded at a catchweight and he was fined 20% of his individual purse, which went to his opponent Montel Jackson. Meanwhile, former Invicta FC Bantamweight Champion Julija Stoliarenko made the weight for her bout against Julia Avila, but the contest was cancelled due to health concerns as Stoliarenko collapsed twice off the scales during her attempts.

A lightweight bout between Gregor Gillespie and Brad Riddell was expected to take serve as the co-main event. However, it was cancelled on the day of the event due to COVID-19 protocols.

== Results ==
Main Card (ESPN / ESPN+)
Weight class				Method	Round	Time	Notes
Middleweight	Derek Brunson	def.	Kevin Holland	Decision (unanimous) (49–45, 49–46, 49–46)	5	5:00
Welterweight	Max Griffin	def.	Song Kenan	KO (punches)	1	2:20
Women's Strawweight	Montserrat Ruiz	def.	Cheyanne Vlismas	Decision (unanimous) (29–28, 29–28, 29–27)	3	5:00
Bantamweight	Adrian Yañez	def.	Gustavo Lopez	KO (punch)	3	0:27
Heavyweight	Tai Tuivasa	def.	Harry Hunsucker	TKO (punches)	1	0:49
Preliminary Card (ESPN2 / ESPN+)
Women's Bantamweight	Macy Chiasson	def.	Marion Reneau	Decision (unanimous) (29–28, 29–28, 29–28)	3	5:00
Lightweight	Grant Dawson	def.	Leonardo Santos	KO (punches)	3	4:59
Middleweight	Trevin Giles	def.	Roman Dolidze	Decision (unanimous) (29–28, 29–28, 29–28)	3	5:00
Catchweight (137.5 lb)	Montel Jackson	def.	Jesse Strader	TKO (punches)	1	1:58
Flyweight	Bruno Gustavo da Silva	def.	JP Buys	TKO (punches)	2	2:56

== Bonus awards ==
The following fighters received $50,000 bonuses.

- Fight of the Night: No bonus awarded.
- Performance of the Night: Max Griffin, Adrian Yañez, Grant Dawson, and Bruno Gustavo da Silva

== See also ==
- List of UFC events
- List of current UFC fighters
- 2021 in UFC
