= Cynthia Calvillo =

American mixed martial artist

- Born: Cynthia Tafoya Calvillo; July 13, 1987 (age 39); San Jose, California, U.S.
- Height: 5 ft 4 in (163 cm)
- Weight: 125 lb (57 kg; 8 st 13 lb)
- Division: Strawweight (2017–2019, 2023–2024); Flyweight (2016, 2020–2022)
- Reach: 64 in (163 cm)
- Style: Brazilian jiu-jitsu, wrestling, Muay Thai
- Fighting out of: Las Vegas, Nevada, U.S.
- Team: Team Alpha Male (–2019); American Kickboxing Academy (2020–2022); Syndicate MMA (2022–present)
- Years active: 2010–2024

Mixed martial arts record
- Total: 17
- Wins: 10
- By knockout: 2
- By submission: 3
- By decision: 5
- Losses: 6
- By knockout: 2
- By decision: 4
- Draws: 1

Other information
- Mixed martial arts record from Sherdog

Cynthia Tafoya Calvillo (/kælˈviːjoʊ/ kal-VEE-yoh, born July 13, 1987) is an American former mixed martial artist who competed in the strawweight and flyweight divisions. She is most notable for her stint in the Ultimate Fighting Championship.

== Mixed martial arts career ==
=== Early career ===
Calvillo made her amateur debut in 2012, and garnered a 5–1 record over the next four years.

=== Ultimate Fighting Championship ===
In her UFC debut, Calvillo accepted a ten-day notice fight against Amanda Cooper at UFC 209 on March 4, 2017. She won the fight via submission in the first round.

Following her successful UFC debut, she was asked to join the main card of UFC 210 against promotional newcomer Pearl Gonzalez. Gonzalez was ruled out of the contest after the NYSAC said she could not fight because of her breast implants, which are banned among combat-sports competitors. Later the decision was reversed and the fight was allowed to go on as scheduled. Calvillo won the fight by third round rear-naked choke submission.

Calvillo faced Joanne Calderwood in a strawweight bout on July 16, 2017, at UFC Fight Night 113. At the weigh-ins, Calderwood came in at 118 pounds, two pounds over the strawweight limit of 116 lbs. As a result, she was fined 20% of her purse, which went to Calvillo and their bout proceeded as scheduled at a catchweight fight. Calvillo won the fight via unanimous decision.

Calvillo faced Carla Esparza on December 30, 2017, at UFC 219. She lost the fight by unanimous decision, with all three judges scoring the bout 29-28 for Esparza. After the fight, it was revealed that Calvillo had failed an in-competition drug test for marijuana metabolites. As a result, she was suspended by USADA for 6 months with the ability to reduce the suspension to 3 months by completing a USADA approved drug awareness program. The Nevada Athletic Commission later extended this to 9 months.

Calvillo faced Poliana Botelho on November 17, 2018, at UFC Fight Night 140. At the weigh-ins, Calvillo weighed in at 118 pounds, 2 pounds over the strawweight non-title fight limit of 116 pounds. She was fined 20 percent of her purse, which went to her opponent, Botelho, and the bout proceeded at catchweight. She won the fight via a rear-naked choke in round one.

Calvillo next faced Cortney Casey on February 17, 2019, at UFC on ESPN: Ngannou vs. Velasquez. She won the fight by unanimous decision.

Calvillo was scheduled to face Lívia Renata Souza on July 13, 2019, at UFC Fight Night 155. However, on June 7, 2019 it was reported that Calvillo was forced to pull out of the bout due to a broken foot and she was replaced by Brianna Van Buren.

Calvillo was scheduled to face Cláudia Gadelha on December 7, 2019, at UFC on ESPN 7. However, on October 22, 2019, it was announced that Gadelha was forced to withdraw from the bout due to broken finger and torn ligament, and she was replaced by Marina Rodriguez. After three rounds of fighting, the bout ended with a majority draw.

Calvillo was scheduled to face Antonina Shevchenko on April 25, 2020. However, on April 9, Dana White, the president of UFC announced that this event was postponed to a future date. Instead Calvillo faced Jessica Eye on June 13, 2020 in the main event at UFC on ESPN: Eye vs. Calvillo. At the weigh-ins on June 12, Eye missed weight, weighing in at 126.25 pounds, a quarter pound over the non-title flyweight limit of 126 pounds. The bout proceeded as a catchweight bout and Eye was fined 25% of her purse. Calvillo won the fight via unanimous decision.

Calvillo was expected to face Lauren Murphy on October 25, 2020, at UFC 254. However, Calvillo was forced to withdraw the bout for undisclosed reason and she was replaced by promotional newcomer Liliya Shakirova.

Calvillo faced Katlyn Chookagian on November 21, 2020, at UFC 255. She lost the fight via unanimous decision.

Calvillo faced Jéssica Andrade on September 25, 2021, at UFC 266. She lost the fight via technical knockout in round one.

Calvillo faced Andrea Lee on November 13, 2021, at UFC Fight Night 197. Calvillo lost the fight via technical knockout when she opted not to continue after the second round.

Calvillo was scheduled to face Nina Nunes on July 9, 2022, at UFC on ESPN 39. However, the day of the event, Nunes withdrew due to illness and the bout was canceled. The bout was rescheduled to August 13, 2022, on UFC on ESPN: Vera vs. Cruz. Calvillo lost the fight via split decision.

Calvillo faced Lupita Godinez on April 8, 2023 at UFC 287. She lost the close bout via split decision.

After her fifth loss in a row, she was released from the UFC.

Despite being released early in the year, Calvillo was scheduled to face Elise Reed at UFC Fight Night 227 on September 16, 2023. However, Calvillo pulled out due to undisclosed reasons and was replaced by Iasmin Lucindo.

Calvillo was scheduled face Piera Rodríguez on April 6, 2024, at UFC Fight Night 240. At the weigh-ins, Calvillo weighed in at 119 pounds, three pounds over the strawweight non-title fight limit. As a result, her bout with Piera Rodriguez was cancelled. After the bout cancellation, Calvillo was released from the UFC again.

=== Post-UFC ===
Calvillo faced Lisa Kyriacou in the main event on September 7, 2024 at "HEX Fight Series 32". She won the title via unanimous decision.

On September 8, 2025, Calvillo announced her retirement from mixed martial arts competition.

== Championships and accomplishments ==
=== Mixed martial arts ===
- Ultimate Fighting Championship
  - Tied (Ji Yeon Kim, Michelle Waterson-Gomez, Marion Reneau & Istela Nunes) for the second longest losing streak in UFC Women's history (5) (behind Andrea Lee)
  - UFC.com Awards
    - 2017: Ranked #2 Newcomer of the Year
- Sports Illustrated
  - 2017 Rookie of the Year
- MMA Junkie
  - 2017 Newcomer of the Year

== Mixed martial arts record ==
Professional record breakdown
17 matches	10 wins	6 losses
By knockout	2	2
By submission	3	0
By decision	5	4
Draws	1	

Res.	Record	Opponent	Method	Event	Date	Round	Time	Location	Notes
Win	10–6–1	Lisa Kyriacou	Decision (unanimous)	HEX Fight Series 32	September 7, 2024	5	5:00	Melbourne, Australia	Won the vacant HEX Women's Flyweight Championship.
Loss	9–6–1	Lupita Godinez	Decision (split)	UFC 287	April 8, 2023	3	5:00	Miami, Florida, United States	Strawweight bout.
Loss	9–5–1	Nina Nunes	Decision (split)	UFC on ESPN: Vera vs. Cruz	August 13, 2022	3	5:00	San Diego, California, United States	
Loss	9–4–1	Andrea Lee	TKO (corner stoppage)	UFC Fight Night: Holloway vs. Rodríguez	November 13, 2021	2	5:00	Las Vegas, Nevada, United States	
Loss	9–3–1	Jéssica Andrade	TKO (punches)	UFC 266	September 25, 2021	1	4:54	Las Vegas, Nevada, United States	
Loss	9–2–1	Katlyn Chookagian	Decision (unanimous)	UFC 255	November 21, 2020	3	5:00	Las Vegas, Nevada, United States	
Win	9–1–1	Jessica Eye	Decision (unanimous)	UFC on ESPN: Eye vs. Calvillo	June 13, 2020	5	5:00	Las Vegas, Nevada, United States	Return to Flyweight; Eye missed weight (126.25 lb).
Draw	8–1–1	Marina Rodriguez	Draw (majority)	UFC on ESPN: Overeem vs. Rozenstruik	December 7, 2019	3	5:00	Washington, D.C., United States	Catchweight (120.5 lb) bout; Calvillo missed weight.
Win	8–1	Cortney Casey	Decision (unanimous)	UFC on ESPN: Ngannou vs. Velasquez	February 17, 2019	3	5:00	Phoenix, Arizona, United States	
Win	7–1	Poliana Botelho	Submission (rear-naked choke)	UFC Fight Night: Magny vs. Ponzinibbio	November 17, 2018	1	4:48	Buenos Aires, Argentina	Catchweight (118 lb) bout; Calvillo missed weight.
Loss	6–1	Carla Esparza	Decision (unanimous)	UFC 219	December 30, 2017	3	5:00	Las Vegas, Nevada, United States	Calvillo tested positive for marijuana metabolites.
Win	6–0	Joanne Calderwood	Decision (unanimous)	UFC Fight Night: Nelson vs. Ponzinibbio	July 16, 2017	3	5:00	Glasgow, Scotland	Catchweight (118 lb) bout; Calderwood missed weight.
Win	5–0	Pearl Gonzalez	Submission (rear-naked choke)	UFC 210	April 8, 2017	3	3:45	Buffalo, New York, United States	
Win	4–0	Amanda Cooper	Submission (rear-naked choke)	UFC 209	March 4, 2017	1	3:19	Las Vegas, Nevada, United States	
Win	3–0	Montana De La Rosa	TKO (punches)	LFA 1	January 13, 2017	3	2:54	Dallas, Texas, United States	Strawweight debut.
Win	2–0	Gillian Robertson	Decision (unanimous)	Global Knockout 8	November 19, 2016	3	5:00	Jackson, California, United States	Catchweight (120 lb) bout.
Win	1–0	Jessica Sanchez-Birch	TKO (punches)	Global Knockout 7	August 27, 2016	2	3:21	Jackson, California, United States	Flyweight debut.

=== Amateur mixed martial arts record ===
Professional record breakdown
6 matches	5 wins	1 loss
By knockout	2	0
By submission	1	0
By decision	2	1

Res.	Record	Opponent	Method	Event	Date	Round	Time	Location	Notes
Win	5–1	Aspen Ladd	Decision (unanimous)	WFC 9 - Mitchell vs. Jara	April 26, 2014	3	5:00	Sacramento, California, United States	Flyweight bout. For the WFC Flyweight title.
Loss	4–1	Brenna Larkin	Decision (unanimous)	Tuff-N-Uff - Festibrawl 5	March 1, 2013	3	3:00	Las Vegas, Nevada, Nevada	
Win	4–0	Jeana Pinelli	Decision (unanimous)	BTF - 2012 Camo State Championship	September 12, 2012	3	5:00	Fremont, California, United States	
Win	3–0	Ariene Culbreath	Submission (rear-naked choke)	WCS 5 - San Jose Fit Expo	July 15, 2012	2	1:13	California, United States	
Win	2–0	Stefanie Harrison	TKO (punches)	Rocktagon MMA - Elite Series 17	April 14, 2012	1	1:29	Salinas, California, United States	Bantamweight bout. For the Rocktagon MMA bantamweight championship.
Win	1–0	Stefanie Harrison	KO (punch)	Rocktagon MMA - Elite Series 14	February 19, 2012	1	1:15	Richmond, California, United States	

== See also ==
- List of female mixed martial artists
