= UFC Fight Night: Smith vs. Rakić =

UFC mixed martial arts event in 2020

- The poster for UFC Fight Night: Smith vs. Rakić
- Promotion: Ultimate Fighting Championship
- Date: August 29, 2020
- Venue: UFC Apex
- City: Enterprise, Nevada, United States
- Attendance: None (behind closed doors)

Event chronology
UFC on ESPN: Munhoz vs. Edgar	UFC Fight Night: Smith vs. Rakić	UFC Fight Night: Overeem vs. Sakai

UFC Fight Night: Smith vs. Rakić (also known as UFC Fight Night 175, UFC on ESPN+ 33 and UFC Vegas 8) was a mixed martial arts event produced by the Ultimate Fighting Championship that took place on August 29, 2020, at the UFC Apex facility in Enterprise, Nevada, part of the Las Vegas Metropolitan Area, United States.

== Background ==
Promotion officials were originally targeting a featherweight bout between The Ultimate Fighter: Latin America featherweight winner Yair Rodríguez and Zabit Magomedsharipov to serve as the event headliner. However, Rodríguez pulled out of the bout on August 5 with an ankle injury and Magomedsharipov announced he would not fight at the event. The pairing was first scheduled to take place at UFC 228 in September 2018, but Rodríguez also pulled out of that event with an injury. The pairing was rescheduled for UFC 254.

On August 15, it was announced that a light heavyweight bout between former UFC Light Heavyweight Championship challenger Anthony Smith and Aleksandar Rakić would serve as a three-round main event.

Emily Whitmire was scheduled to face Polyana Viana in a women's strawweight bout at UFC 248 earlier this year. However, Whitmire weighed in at 117.5 pounds, one and a half pounds over the strawweight non-title fight limit. She was subsequently hospitalized the day of the event, thus cancelling the fight. The pairing was rescheduled for this event instead. It was reportedly rescheduled as a women's flyweight bout, but ultimately took place as a women's strawweight contest.

A featherweight bout between former UFC Featherweight Championship challenger Ricardo Lamas and The Ultimate Fighter: Team McGregor vs. Team Faber lightweight winner Ryan Hall was also scheduled to initially take place earlier this year at UFC Fight Night: Hermansson vs. Weidman, but the event was cancelled in mid-March due to the COVID-19 pandemic. The pairing was rescheduled for this event. In turn, Hall pulled out due to undisclosed reasons a week before the event. He was replaced by promotional newcomer Bill Algeo.

A welterweight bout between Neil Magny and Geoff Neal was scheduled to take place at this event. However, Neal withdrew from the event on August 9 due to a severe case of pneumonia that evolved to sepsis. He was replaced by former UFC Welterweight Champion Robbie Lawler. The original pairing is now expected to take place at UFC on ESPN: Rodriguez vs. Waterson

A light heavyweight rematch between Magomed Ankalaev and Ion Cuțelaba was expected to take place at this event. The pair first met at UFC Fight Night: Benavidez vs. Figueiredo, where Ankalaev won via controversial knockout. The bout was originally expected to take place at UFC 249, on its original April 18 date. However, Ankalaev was forced to pull out of the event due to travel restrictions related to the COVID-19 pandemic. They were later rebooked for UFC 252, but Cuțelaba then pulled out after he tested positive for COVID-19 and the bout was rescheduled for this event. Cuțelaba tested positive yet again on the day of the event, resulting in another cancellation of this fight.

A featherweight bout between Alex Caceres and Giga Chikadze was initially scheduled to take place three weeks earlier at UFC Fight Night: Lewis vs. Oleinik, but was pushed back to this event due to undisclosed reasons. In turn, Chikadze withdrew from the bout on August 26 after testing positive for COVID-19 and was briefly replaced by promotional newcomer Kevin Croom. Subsequently on the following day, Croom was removed and replaced by fellow newcomer Austin Springer.

A middleweight bout between Maki Pitolo and promotional newcomer Impa Kasanganay was briefly linked to UFC on ESPN: Munhoz vs. Edgar a week earlier. However, promotion officials elected to move the pairing a week later to this event.

A middleweight bout between Saparbek Safarov and Julian Marquez was scheduled for this event. However, the bout was moved to UFC Fight Night: Blaydes vs. Lewis in November after Safarov faced travel restrictions related to the COVID-19 pandemic.

At the weigh-ins, Hannah Cifers and Austin Springer missed weight for their respective bouts. Cifers weighed in at 117 pounds, one pound over the strawweight non-title fight limit. Springer weighed in at 151 pounds, five pounds over the featherweight non-title fight limit. Both of their bouts proceeded at catchweight and they were each fined 20% and 30% of their individual purses respectively, which went to their opponents Mallory Martin and Alex Caceres.

== Results ==
Main card (ESPN+)
Weight class				Method	Round	Time	Notes
Light Heavyweight	Aleksandar Rakić	def.	Anthony Smith	Decision (unanimous) (30–26, 30–27, 30–27)	3	5:00
Welterweight	Neil Magny	def.	Robbie Lawler	Decision (unanimous) (30–27, 30–27, 30–27)	3	5:00
Women's Flyweight	Alexa Grasso	def.	Ji Yeon Kim	Decision (unanimous) (30–27, 30–27, 30–27)	3	5:00
Featherweight	Ricardo Lamas	def.	Bill Algeo	Decision (unanimous) (29–27, 29–27, 29–27)	3	5:00
Preliminary card (ESPN / ESPN+)
Middleweight	Impa Kasanganay	def.	Maki Pitolo	Decision (unanimous) (30–27, 30–27, 30–27)	3	5:00
Middleweight	Zak Cummings	def.	Alessio Di Chirico	Decision (unanimous) (29–28, 29–28, 30–27)	3	5:00
Catchweight (151 lb)	Alex Caceres	def.	Austin Springer	Submission (rear-naked choke)	1	3:38
Welterweight	Sean Brady	def.	Christian Aguilera	Submission (guillotine choke)	2	1:47
Women's Strawweight	Polyana Viana	def.	Emily Whitmire	Submission (armbar)	1	1:53
Catchweight (117 lb)	Mallory Martin	def.	Hannah Cifers	Submission (rear-naked choke)	2	1:33

== Bonus awards ==
The following fighters received $50,000 bonuses.

- Fight of the Night: Ricardo Lamas vs. Bill Algeo
- Performance of the Night: Sean Brady and Mallory Martin

== See also ==
- List of UFC events
- List of current UFC fighters
- 2020 in UFC
