= Strawweight (MMA) =

Mixed martial arts weight class

The strawweight division in mixed martial arts is for competitors weighing between 106 and 115 lb (48 to 52 kg). It sits between the lighter atomweight division and the heavier flyweight division.

- The UFC's strawweight division, which groups competitors within 106 to 115 lb (48 to 52 kg)
- The ONE Championship's strawweight division, with upper limit at 56.7 kg (125.0 lb)
- The Road FC's strawweight division, with upper limit at 115 lb (52 kg)
- Pancrase's strawweight division, which groups competitors within 110.2 to 115.2 lb (50 to 52.2 kg)
- Oktagon MMA's women’s strawweight division, with upper limit at 53 kg (116.8 lb)
- Shooto's strawweight division, with upper limit at 52 kg (114.6 lb) and 52.2 kg (115.1 lb) for women’s competitors.
- The Legacy Fighting Alliance's women’s strawweight division, with upper limit at 115 lb (52.2 kg)
- Jungle Fight's women’s strawweight division, with upper limit at 52 kg (114.6 lb)

== Ambiguity and clarification ==
Until recently, the strawweight division in mixed martial arts was not defined by the Unified Rules of Mixed Martial Arts, which since the inception of the Unified Rules had grouped all competitors below 125 lb (57 kg) together as flyweights. Support for the class has grown steadily since about 2013:

- Invicta Fighting Championships, an all women's MMA organization, held their first strawweight title fight on January 5, 2013, and now regularly holds contests at this weight and circulates a championship title.
- Super Fight League, an Indian MMA promotion, have been holding female strawweight fights at 105-115 pounds / 52.2 kilograms since SFL 17 in May 2013.
- In Japan, Shooto regularly holds contests at that weight class and circulates a championship belt for the division.
- UFC has added a women's strawweight division that is set at 115 lbs.
- Carla Esparza became the inaugural UFC Women's Strawweight Champion at The Ultimate Fighter: A Champion Will Be Crowned Finale on December 12, 2014.
- The Association of Boxing Commissions officially added the 115 lb strawweight division on July 29, 2015.

== Professional champions ==
=== Current champions ===
These tables were last updated in December of 2025.

Active title reign
Active title reign (interim)

Men:

Organization	Reign Began	Champion	Record	Defenses
ONE Championship	March 1, 2024	(Philippines) Joshua Pacio	23-5-0 (8KO 9SUB)	2
Pancrase	July 18, 2022	(Japan) Keito Yamakita	11-1-0 (1KO 3SUB)	0
Pancrase	December 28, 2024	(Japan) Koyuru Tanoue	10-4-0 (5KO 0SUB)	1
DEEP	May 26, 2024	(Japan) Haruo Ochi	27-11-1 (2) (8KO 9SUB)	0

Women:

Organization	Reign Began	Champion	Record	Defenses
UFC	October 25, 2025	(Brazil) Mackenzie Dern	17–5 (0KO 8SUB)	1
Invicta FC	N/A	Vacant	N/A	N/A
Deep Jewels	September 7, 2025	(Japan) Machi Fukuda	9-2 (1KO 4SUB)	0
Legacy Fighting Alliance	September 5, 2025	(Brazil) Aieza Bertolso	7-0 (1KO 4SUB)	0
Oktagon MMA	October 12, 2024	(United States) Mallory Martin	11-6 (2KO 2SUB)	1
Shooto	May 21, 2024	(Japan) Emi Fujino	30-16-1 (1) (3KO 11SUB)	0
Jungle Fight	July 20, 2024	(Brazil) Laura Vasconcelos	5-0 (4KO 0SUB)	1

== See also ==
- List of current MMA Strawweight Champions
- List of current MMA Women's Strawweight Champions
- Mixed martial arts weight classes
