= Ledet =

Ledet is a surname. Notable people with the surname include:

- Joshua Ledet (born 1992), American singer
- Rosie Ledet (born 1971), American accordionist and singer
- Justin Ledet (born 1988), American mixed martial artist and boxer

== See also ==
- Law Enforcement Detachments, LEDETs
- Ledet (Tigrinya: ልደት), Ethiopian Christmas
