= UFC 260 =

2021 MMA event

UFC 260: Miocic vs. Ngannou 2
- The poster for UFC 260: Miocic vs. Ngannou 2
- Promotion: Ultimate Fighting Championship
- Date: March 27, 2021
- Venue: UFC Apex
- City: Enterprise, Nevada, United States
- Attendance: None (behind closed doors)

Event chronology
UFC on ESPN: Brunson vs. Holland	UFC 260: Miocic vs. Ngannou 2	UFC on ABC: Vettori vs. Holland

UFC 260: Miocic vs. Ngannou 2 was a mixed martial arts event produced by the Ultimate Fighting Championship that took place on March 27, 2021, at the UFC Apex facility in Enterprise, Nevada, part of the Las Vegas Metropolitan Area, United States.

== Background ==
A UFC Heavyweight Championship rematch bout between current two-time champion Stipe Miocic and Francis Ngannou headlined this event. The pairing met previously at UFC 220 on January 20, 2018, where Miocic won via unanimous decision and broke the record for most consecutive title defenses for the division with his third.

A UFC Featherweight Championship bout between current champion Alexander Volkanovski and former title challenger Brian Ortega would have served as the co-main event. However, the fight was cancelled a week before taking place as Volkanovski tested positive for COVID-19. The pairing was later rescheduled for UFC 266.

Johnny Walker was expected to face Jimmy Crute in a light heavyweight bout at the event. However, Walker pulled out of the fight in early February citing a chest injury. Promotion officials elected to remove Crute from the card and reschedule him against Anthony Smith the following month at UFC 261.

A heavyweight bout between former WSOF Heavyweight Champion Blagoy Ivanov and Marcin Tybura was scheduled to take place at the event. However, Ivanov was pulled from the bout in late February, citing an injury. Tybura is now expected to compete against Walt Harris at UFC Fight Night 193 on June 5.

A women's flyweight bout between Gillian Robertson and Miranda Maverick was scheduled for UFC 258, but it was cancelled on the day of the event after Robertson had a non-COVID related illness. They eventually met at this event.

A women's strawweight bout between Randa Markos and promotional newcomer Luana Pinheiro was expected to take place at the event. However, Markos was removed from the card on March 18 after testing positive for COVID-19. The pairing was left intact and rescheduled five weeks later at UFC on ESPN: Reyes vs. Procházka.

Former Invicta FC Atomweight Champion and UFC Women's Strawweight Championship challenger Jessica Penne and Hannah Goldy were expected to meet in a women's strawweight bout at the event. However, on March 24, Goldy tested positive for COVID-19 and the bout was postponed. The pairing remained intact and was rescheduled for UFC on ESPN: Whittaker vs. Gastelum.

A light heavyweight bout between Alonzo Menifield and William Knight was originally expected to take place at UFC Fight Night: Rozenstruik vs. Gane. However, the bout was postponed during the week leading up to the event after Menifield tested positive for COVID-19. The bout was then rescheduled for this event, but this time Knight was removed due to COVID-19 protocols and was replaced by promotional newcomer Fabio Cherant. At the weight-ins, Cherant weighted 206.5 pounds, half a pound over the non-title light heavyweight limit. His bout proceeded at a catchweight and he was fined 20% of his individual purse, which went to Menifield.

This was the final event under the UFC's outfitting policy with Reebok.

== Results ==
Main card
Weight class				Method	Round	Time	Notes
Heavyweight	Francis Ngannou	def.	Stipe Miocic (c)	KO (punch)	2	0:52	(Note: For the UFC Heavyweight Championship.)
Welterweight	Vicente Luque	def.	Tyron Woodley	Submission (brabo choke)	1	3:56
Bantamweight	Sean O'Malley	def.	Thomas Almeida	KO (punches)	3	3:52
Women’s Flyweight	Miranda Maverick	def.	Gillian Robertson	Decision (unanimous) (30–27, 30–27, 29–28)	3	5:00
Lightweight	Jamie Mullarkey	def.	Khama Worthy	KO (punches)	1	0:46
Preliminary card (ESPN / ESPN+)
Catchweight (206.5 lb)	Alonzo Menifield	def.	Fabio Cherant	Submission (shoulder choke)	1	1:11
Welterweight	Abubakar Nurmagomedov	def.	Jared Gooden	Decision (unanimous) (30–27, 30–27, 30–27)	3	5:00
Light Heavyweight	Michał Oleksiejczuk	def.	Modestas Bukauskas	Decision (split) (29–28, 28–29, 29–28)	3	5:00
Featherweight	Omar Morales	def.	Shane Young	Decision (unanimous) (30–27, 30–27, 30–27)	3	5:00
Early preliminary card (ESPN+ / UFC Fight Pass)
Middleweight	Marc-André Barriault	def.	Abu Azaitar	TKO (punches)	3	4:56

== Bonus awards ==
The following fighters received $50,000 bonuses.

- Fight of the Night: Vicente Luque vs. Tyron Woodley
- Performance of the Night: Francis Ngannou and Sean O'Malley

== See also ==
- List of UFC events
- List of current UFC fighters
- 2021 in UFC
