= UFC Fight Night: Shevchenko vs. Carmouche 2 =

UFC mixed martial arts event in 2019

- The poster for UFC Fight Night: Shevchenko vs. Carmouche 2
- Promotion: Ultimate Fighting Championship
- Date: August 10, 2019
- Venue: Antel Arena
- City: Montevideo, Uruguay
- Attendance: 9,225

Event chronology
UFC on ESPN: Covington vs. Lawler	UFC Fight Night: Shevchenko vs. Carmouche 2	UFC 241: Cormier vs. Miocic 2

UFC Fight Night: Shevchenko vs. Carmouche 2 (also known as UFC Fight Night 156 or UFC on ESPN+ 14) was a mixed martial arts event produced by the Ultimate Fighting Championship that took place on August 10, 2019 at Antel Arena in Montevideo, Uruguay.

== Background ==
The event marked the promotion's first visit to Uruguay, the 24th country.

A UFC Women's Flyweight Championship bout between current champion Valentina Shevchenko and former UFC Women's Bantamweight Championship challenger Liz Carmouche headlined the event. The pairing met previously under a regional promotion banner in 2010 with Carmouche winning the first bout via second-round TKO (doctor stoppage).

A light heavyweight bout between former UFC Light Heavyweight Championship challenger Volkan Oezdemir and Ilir Latifi was originally scheduled for June 1 at UFC Fight Night: Gustafsson vs. Smith. However, the bout was canceled after Latifi pulled out two days before the event due to a back injury and then rescheduled for UFC on ESPN: Covington vs. Lawler. In turn, the bout was then shifted to this event a week later after Oezdemir was faced with alleged visa issues which affected his travel schedule.

A lightweight bout between Rafael Fiziev and Alex da Silva Coelho was scheduled for the event. However, it was reported on July 24 that Fiziev had broken his foot and was forced to pull out of the event. He was replaced by promotional newcomer Kazula Vargas.

A flyweight bout between Veronica Macedo and Rachael Ostovich was scheduled for the event. However, it was announced on July 29 that Ostovich was replaced by Polyana Viana for an undisclosed reason.

A welterweight bout between Laureano Staropoli and Alexey Kunchenko was scheduled for the event. However, it was announced on July 29 that Staropoli was forced to pull out of the fight due to a broken nose and was replaced by Gilbert Burns.

A flyweight bout between Ashlee Evans-Smith and Taila Santos was expected for the event. However, Evans-Smith withdrew the bout for an undisclosed reason and was replaced by promotional newcomer Ariane Carnelossi. In turn, it was reported on July 29 that Santos was forced to pull out of the bout due to a wrist injury. No replacement could be found for Santos, thus the bout was cancelled.

== Results ==
Main card (ESPN+)
Weight class				Method	Round	Time	Notes
Women's Flyweight	Valentina Shevchenko (c)	def.	Liz Carmouche	Decision (unanimous) (50–45, 50–45, 50–45)	5	5:00	(Note: For the UFC Women's Flyweight Championship.)
Welterweight	Vicente Luque	def.	Mike Perry	Decision (split) (28–29, 29–28, 29–28)	3	5:00
Featherweight	Luiz Eduardo Garagorri	def.	Humberto Bandenay	Decision (unanimous) (30–27, 30–27, 30–27)	3	5:00
Light Heavyweight	Volkan Oezdemir	def.	Ilir Latifi	KO (punches)	2	4:31
Middleweight	Rodolfo Vieira	def.	Oskar Piechota	Submission (arm-triangle choke)	2	4:26
Featherweight	Enrique Barzola	def.	Bobby Moffett	Decision (split) (28–29, 30–27, 29–28)	3	5:00
Preliminary card (ESPN+)
Welterweight	Gilbert Burns	def.	Alexey Kunchenko	Decision (unanimous) (29–28, 29–28, 29–28)	3	5:00
Heavyweight	Ciryl Gane	def.	Raphael Pessoa	Submission (arm-triangle choke)	1	4:12
Women's Strawweight	Marina Rodriguez	def.	Tecia Torres	Decision (unanimous) (30–27, 30–27, 30–26)	3	5:00
Flyweight	Rogério Bontorin	def.	Raulian Paiva	TKO (doctor stoppage)	1	2:56
Bantamweight	Chris Gutiérrez	def.	Geraldo de Freitas	Decision (split) (29–28, 27–30, 29–28)	3	5:00
Lightweight	Alex da Silva Coelho	def.	Kazula Vargas	Decision (unanimous) (30–27, 30–27, 30–27)	3	5:00
Women's Flyweight	Veronica Macedo	def.	Polyana Viana	Submission (armbar)	1	1:09

== Bonus awards ==
The following fighters received $50,000 bonuses.

- Fight of the Night: Vicente Luque vs. Mike Perry
- Performance of the Night: Volkan Oezdemir and Veronica Macedo

== See also ==
- List of UFC events
- 2019 in UFC
- List of current UFC fighters
