= UFC on ESPN: Lewis vs. Nascimento =

2024 mixed martial event in Missouri, US

- The poster for UFC on ESPN: Lewis vs. Nascimento
- Promotion: Ultimate Fighting Championship
- Date: May 11, 2024
- Venue: Enterprise Center
- City: St. Louis, Missouri, United States
- Attendance: 15,960
- Total gate: $2,470,197

Event chronology
UFC 301: Pantoja vs. Erceg	UFC on ESPN: Lewis vs. Nascimento	UFC Fight Night: Barboza vs. Murphy

UFC on ESPN: Lewis vs. Nascimento (also known as UFC on ESPN 56) was a mixed martial arts event produced by the Ultimate Fighting Championship that took place on May 11, 2024, at the Enterprise Center, in St. Louis, Missouri, United States.

== Background ==
The event marked the promotion's second visit to St. Louis and first since UFC Fight Night: Stephens vs. Choi in January 2018.

A heavyweight bout between former UFC Heavyweight Championship challenger Derrick Lewis and Rodrigo Nascimento headlined the event.

A light heavyweight bout between Carlos Ulberg and Alonzo Menifield was expected to take place at UFC Fight Night: Blanchfield vs. Fiorot on March 30, but it was moved to this event due to undisclosed reasons.

A lightweight bout between Matt Frevola and Michael Johnson was expected to take place at the event, but it was scrapped after Johnson withdrew.

A welterweight bout between Jared Gooden and Kevin Jousset was scheduled for the event. However, for medical reasons, Gooden was unable to compete and the bout was cancelled.

== Results ==
Main card (ESPN / ESPN+)
Weight class				Method	Round	Time	Notes
Heavyweight	Derrick Lewis	def.	Rodrigo Nascimento	TKO (punches)	3	0:49
Welterweight	Joaquin Buckley	def.	Nursulton Ruziboev	Decision (unanimous) (30–27, 30–26, 29–27)	3	5:00
Light Heavyweight	Carlos Ulberg	def.	Alonzo Menifield	KO (punches)	1	0:12
Lightweight	Carlos Diego Ferreira	def.	Mateusz Rębecki	TKO (punches)	3	4:51
Featherweight	Sean Woodson	def.	Alex Caceres	Decision (unanimous) (29–28, 29–28, 30–27)	3	5:00
Heavyweight	Waldo Cortes-Acosta	def.	Robelis Despaigne	Decision (unanimous) (30–26, 30–27, 30–27)	3	5:00
Preliminary card (ESPN / ESPN+)
Lightweight	Chase Hooper	def.	Viacheslav Borshchev	Submission (brabo choke)	2	3:00
Lightweight	Esteban Ribovics	def.	Terrance McKinney	KO (head kick)	1	0:37
Women's Strawweight	Tabatha Ricci	def.	Tecia Pennington	Decision (split) (28–29, 29–28, 29–28)	3	5:00
Welterweight	Trey Waters	def.	Billy Goff	Decision (unanimous) (30–27, 30–27, 29–28)	3	5:00
Flyweight	Charles Johnson	def.	Jake Hadley	Decision (unanimous) (29–28, 29–28, 29–28)	3	5:00
Women's Flyweight	Veronica Hardy	def.	JJ Aldrich	Decision (unanimous) (29–28, 29–28, 29–28)	3	5:00

== Bonus awards ==
The following fighters received $50,000 bonuses.

- Fight of the Night: Trey Waters vs. Billy Goff
- Performance of the Night: Carlos Ulberg and Carlos Diego Ferreira

== See also ==
- 2024 in UFC
- List of current UFC fighters
- List of UFC events
