= Fabio Cherant =

American mixed martial arts fighter

- Born: November 25, 1994 (age 31); Brooklyn, New York, United States
- Other names: Water Buffalo
- Height: 6 ft 1 in (1.85 m)
- Weight: 205 lb (93 kg; 14 st 9 lb)
- Division: Light Heavyweight
- Reach: 74.0 in (188 cm)
- Fighting out of: Wrentham, Massachusetts
- Team: Lauzon Mixed Martial Arts
- Years active: 2018–present

Mixed martial arts record
- Total: 12
- Wins: 7
- By submission: 5
- By decision: 2
- Losses: 5
- By knockout: 2
- By submission: 2
- By decision: 1

Other information
- Mixed martial arts record from Sherdog

Fabio Cherant (born November 25, 1994) is an American mixed martial artist who formerly competed in the Light Heavyweight division of the Ultimate Fighting Championship.

== Background ==
Born in the Brooklyn borough of New York, Cherant had a nomadic childhood, in part because off his experience as a foster child, ending up in up in Wrentham for his high school years, spending those at King Philip Regional High School.

Starting training at the age of 19, when he was 21, he walked into a gym and made his MMA debut not long after. Cherant went to community college to study athletic training and criminal justice, stopping after a year to join the army reserves.

== Mixed martial arts career ==
=== Early career ===
Making his MMA debut in 2018, Cherant won his first three bouts by submission in the first round; James Dysard via guillotine choke at CES MMA 48, followed Marquis Allen also by guillotine at CES MMA 50, and then Buck Pineau via rear-naked choke at CES MMA 51. In his final outing with CES MMA, he submitted Ron Marshall via rear-naked choke in the second round at CES MMA 53.

In the main event of Dana White's Contender Series 22, Cherant faced Aleksa Camur and went lose by the way of TKO in the second round via flying knee.

In his promotional debut appearance with Legacy Fighting Alliance at LFA 86, he faced Erick Murray and submitted him via anaconda choke in the first round. Making a return to CES, Cherant faced Yu Ji at CES 61, winning the bout via unanimous decision. Cherant faced Myron Dennis at LFA 99 for the LFA Light Heavyweight Championship. He won the bout and the title via unanimous decision.

=== Ultimate Fighting Championship ===
Cherant, as a replacement for William Knight, faced Alonzo Menifield on March 27, 2021, at UFC 260. At the weight-ins, Cherant weighted 206.5 pounds, half a pound over the non-title light heavyweight limit. The bout proceeded at a catchweight and he was fined 20% of his individual purse, which went to his opponent Menifield. Menifield won the fight via Von Flue choke in round one.

Cherant faced William Knight on August 21, 2021, at UFC on ESPN: Cannonier vs. Gastelum. He lost the fight via knockout in round one.

Cherant faced Carlos Ulberg on February 12, 2022, at UFC 271. He lost the bout via unanimous decision.

On March 1, 2022, it was announced that Cherant was released from the UFC.

=== Post-UFC Career ===
Cherant was scheduled to face Richardson Moreira on February 10, 2023, at Combat FC 3 but the bout was cancelled due to Moreira withdrawing from the bout.

In his first fight since departing the UFC, Cherant faced Christian Larsen in the co-main event of Unified MMA 58 on June 14, 2024. He would lose the fight via submission late in the first round.

== Championships and accomplishments ==
- Legacy Fighting Alliance
  - LFA Light Heavyweight Championship (One time)

== Mixed martial arts record ==
Professional record breakdown
12 matches	7 wins	5 losses
By knockout	0	2
By submission	5	2
By decision	2	1

Res.	Record	Opponent	Method	Event	Date	Round	Time	Location	Notes
Loss	7–5	Christian Larsen	Submission (scarf hold)	Unified MMA 58	June 14, 2024	1	4:17	Enoch, Alberta, Canada	Heavyweight debut.
Loss	7–4	Carlos Ulberg	Decision (unanimous)	UFC 271	February 12, 2022	3	5:00	Houston, Texas, United States	
Loss	7–3	William Knight	KO (punches)	UFC on ESPN: Cannonier vs. Gastelum	August 21, 2021	1	3:58	Las Vegas, Nevada, United States	
Loss	7–2	Alonzo Menifield	Submission (shoulder choke)	UFC 260	March 27, 2021	1	1:11	Las Vegas, Nevada, United States	Catchweight (206.5 lb) bout; Cherant missed weight.
Win	7–1	Myron Dennis	Decision (unanimous)	LFA 99	February 12, 2021	5	5:00	Park City, Kansas, United States	Won the vacant LFA Light Heavyweight Championship.
Win	6–1	Yu Ji	Decision (unanimous)	CES 61	October 14, 2020	3	5:00	Warwick, Rhode Island, United States	Catchweight (209 lb) bout; Cherant missed weight.
Win	5–1	Erick Murray Jr.	Submission (anaconda choke)	LFA 86	July 24, 2020	1	0:57	Sioux Falls, South Dakota, United States	Catchweight (213.6 lb) bout; Cherant missed weight.
Loss	4–1	Aleksa Camur	TKO (flying knee and punches)	Dana White's Contender Series 22	July 30, 2019	2	0:48	Las Vegas, Nevada, United States	
Win	4–0	Ron Marshall	Submission (rear-naked choke)	CES 53	November 2, 2018	2	2:41	Lincoln, Rhode Island, United States	
Win	3–0	Buck Pineau	Submission (rear-naked choke)	CES 51	August 3, 2018	1	2:43	Lincoln, Rhode Island, United States	
Win	2–0	Marquis Allen	Submission (guillotine choke)	CES 50	June 15, 2018	1	3:55	Lincoln, Rhode Island, United States	
Win	1–0	James Dysard	Submission (guillotine choke)	CES 48	February 2, 2018	1	0:13	Lincoln, Rhode Island, United States	Light Heavyweight debut.

== See also ==
- List of male mixed martial artists
