= Volkan Oezdemir =

Swiss mixed martial artist (born 1989)

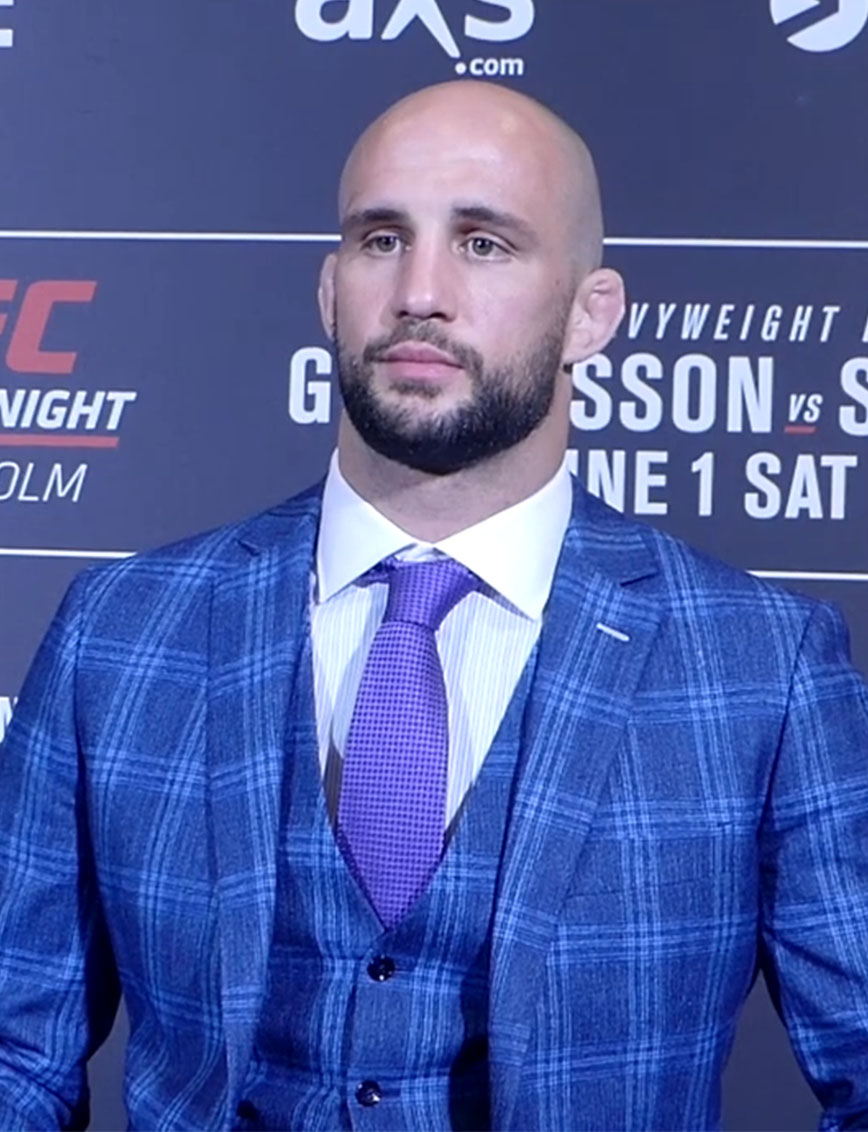
- Oezdemir at UFC Fight Night 153 in Stockholm, Sweden
- Born: 19 September 1989 (age 37); Fribourg, Switzerland
- Other names: No Time
- Height: 6 ft 1 in (185 cm)
- Weight: 205 lb (93 kg; 14 st 9 lb)
- Division: Light heavyweight (2010–2014, 2017–present); Heavyweight (2012, 2014–2016)
- Reach: 75 in (191 cm)
- Style: Kickboxing
- Stance: Orthodox
- Fighting out of: Fribourg, Switzerland
- Team: Golden Glory (formerly); Fight Move Academy (until 2022); Blackzilians (2015–2015); Kill Cliff FC (2017–present); Allstars Training Center (2022–present)
- Years active: 2010–present (MMA); 2014 (Kickboxing)

Kickboxing record
- Total: 5
- Wins: 5

Mixed martial arts record
- Total: 29
- Wins: 21
- By knockout: 14
- By submission: 2
- By decision: 5
- Losses: 8
- By knockout: 2
- By submission: 2
- By decision: 4

Other information
- Mixed martial arts record from Sherdog

Volkan Oezdemir (born 19 September 1989) is a Swiss professional mixed martial artist and former kickboxer. He currently competes in the Light heavyweight division of the Ultimate Fighting Championship (UFC). A professional since 2010, Oezdemir formerly competed for Bellator. As a kickboxer, he competed for Superkombat Fighting Championship in their heavyweight division. As of 20 June 2026, he is #8 in the UFC light heavyweight rankings.

== Background ==
Oezdemir was born in the French-speaking part of Switzerland. In a vlog from the UFC YouTube channel for the UFC 220 event, he stated that his father is ethnically Zaza from Tunceli and his mother is ethnically Swiss. He befriended Alistair Overeem on a visit to the Netherlands while training at the Golden Glory gym. Oezdemir later competed in amateur and professional kickboxing, as well as Brazilian Jiu-Jitsu, before transitioning to mixed martial arts.

== Mixed martial arts career ==
=== Early career ===
Oezdemir made his professional MMA debut in 2010, and compiled a record of 9–0 before being signed by Bellator.

=== Bellator MMA ===
Oezdemir made his promotional debut at Bellator 105 on 25 October 2013, against Josh Lanier. He won the fight via first-round TKO.

Oezdemir then dropped down to the Light Heavyweight division to face Kelly Anundson at Bellator 115 on 4 April 2014. He lost the fight via a neck crank submission in the second round.

With little to no fights to be offered by the promotion, they amicably voided the contract and Oezdemir became a free agent.

=== Ultimate Fighting Championship ===
Oezdemir was signed by the UFC in 2017, and made his promotional debut as a short notice injury replacement against Ovince St. Preux on 4 February 2017, at UFC Fight Night 104. Oezdemir defeated St. Preux by split decision in the third fight of the main card.

In his second fight for the promotion, Oezdemir faced Misha Cirkunov on 28 May 2017, at UFC Fight Night 109. He won the fight via knockout just 28 seconds into the first round.

Oezdemir next faced third ranked Jimi Manuwa on 29 July 2017, at UFC 214. He won the fight via knockout in the fight's opening minute and subsequently won a Performance of the Night bonus.

Oezdemir faced Daniel Cormier on 20 January 2018, at UFC 220 for the UFC Light Heavyweight Championship. He lost the fight via TKO in the second round.

==== Post-title shot ====
Oezdemir was expected to face Maurício Rua on 12 May 2018, at UFC Fight Night 129. However it was reported on 13 April 2018, that Oezdemir was pulled from the event due to alleged visa issues restricting his travel to Chile. The pairing was left intact and rescheduled for 22 July 2018, at UFC Fight Night 134. On 2 July 2018 it was reported that the Oezdemir would face Alexander Gustafsson instead on 4 August 2018, at UFC 227. However, on 19 July 2018, it was reported that Oezdemir was removed from the bout due to a broken nose.

Oezdemir faced Anthony Smith on 27 October 2018, at UFC Fight Night 138. He lost the fight via a rear-naked choke submission in the third round.

Oezdemir faced Dominick Reyes on 16 March 2019, at UFC Fight Night 147. He lost the fight via controversial split decision.

Oezdemir was expected to face Ilir Latifi on 1 June 2019, at UFC Fight Night 153. On 30 May 2019, it was reported that Latifi was forced to pull out of the event due to back injury and the bout was cancelled. The pair was rebooked at UFC on ESPN 5 on 3 August 2019. In turn, due to Oezdemir's visa issues entering the United States, the bout was moved to UFC Fight Night 156. He won the fight via knockout in the second round. This win earned him the Performance of the Night award.

Oezdemir faced Aleksandar Rakić on 21 December 2019, at UFC Fight Night 165. He won the fight via split decision.

In April 2020, Oezdemir revealed that he had renewed his contract with the UFC.

Oezdemir faced promotional newcomer Jiří Procházka on 12 July 2020, at UFC 251. He lost the fight via knockout in the second round.

Oezdemir was expected to face Nikita Krylov on 18 October 2020, at UFC Fight Night 180. However, Oezdemir pulled out of the fight in early October citing a knee injury.

Oezdemir was scheduled to face Magomed Ankalaev on 4 September 2021, at UFC Fight Night 191. However, the fight was rescheduled for UFC 267 in Abu Dhabi on 30 October. He lost the bout via unanimous decision.

Oezdemir faced Paul Craig on 23 July 2022, at UFC Fight Night 208. He won the bout by unanimous decision.

The bout with Nikita Krylov was then re-booked to take place on 22 October 2022, at UFC 280. He lost the bout via unanimous decision.

Oezdemir was scheduled to face Azamat Murzakanov at UFC Fight Night 226 on 2 September 2023. However, Murzakanov pulled out in early August for unknown reasons and was replaced by promotional newcomer Bogdan Guskov. He won the fight via a rear-naked choke submission in the first round.

Oezdemir faced Johnny Walker on 22 June 2024, at UFC on ABC 6. He won the fight by knockout in the first round. This fight earned him another Performance of the Night award.

Oezdemir faced Carlos Ulberg on 23 November 2024, at UFC Fight Night 248. He lost the fight by unanimous decision.

Oezdemir faced Alonzo Menifield on 22 November 2025, at UFC Fight Night 265. He won the fight by knockout in the first round.

After testing positive for EPO on 16 February 2026, Oezdemir was suspended for sixteen months and will be eligible to compete on 17 June 2027.

== Kickboxing career ==
Oezdemir also holds a record of 5–0 in professional kickboxing. He made his debut in Romania-based SUPERKOMBAT, the largest kickboxing promotion in Europe, in 2014.

== Personal life ==
=== Aggravated battery case ===
On 19 November 2017, Oezdemir was arrested for aggravated battery. His bail was reportedly set at $10,000. On 9 July 2018, he informed that the charges pressed against him were dropped.

== Championships and accomplishments ==
=== Mixed martial arts ===
- Ultimate Fighting Championship
  - Performance of the Night (Three times) vs. Jimi Manuwa, Ilir Latifi and Johnny Walker
  - UFC.com Awards
    - 2017: Newcomer of the Year & Ranked #6 Fighter of the Year
- World Kickboxing Network
  - Valhalla: Battle of the Vikings Tournament Winner
- MMA Mania
  - 2017 #5 Ranked Fighter of the Year
- Sherdog
  - 2017 Breakthrough Fighter of the Year
- MMA Junkie
  - 2017 Breakout Fighter of the Year
- Bloody Elbow
  - 2017 Newcomer of the Year
- MMA Sucka
  - 2017 Best UFC Breakout Star
- Fight Matrix
  - 2017 Most Improved Fighter of the Year
  - 2017 Most Lopsided Upset of the Year vs. Ovince Saint Preux at UFC Fight Night 104
- CBS Sports
  - 2017 #4 Ranked UFC Knockout of the Year vs. Jimi Manuwa
- Combat Press
  - 2017 Breakout Fighter of the Year

== Mixed martial arts record ==
Professional record breakdown
29 matches	21 wins	8 losses
By knockout	14	2
By submission	2	2
By decision	5	4

Res.	Record	Opponent	Method	Event	Date	Round	Time	Location	Notes
Win	21–8	Alonzo Menifield	KO (knee and punches)	UFC Fight Night: Tsarukyan vs. Hooker	22 November 2025	1	1:27	Al Rayyan, Qatar	
Loss	20–8	Carlos Ulberg	Decision (unanimous)	UFC Fight Night: Yan vs. Figueiredo	23 November 2024	3	5:00	Macau SAR, China	
Win	20–7	Johnny Walker	KO (punch)	UFC on ABC: Whittaker vs. Aliskerov	22 June 2024	1	2:28	Riyadh, Saudi Arabia	Performance of the Night.
Win	19–7	Bogdan Guskov	Submission (rear-naked choke)	UFC Fight Night: Gane vs. Spivac	2 September 2023	1	3:46	Paris, France	
Loss	18–7	Nikita Krylov	Decision (unanimous)	UFC 280	22 October 2022	3	5:00	Abu Dhabi, United Arab Emirates	
Win	18–6	Paul Craig	Decision (unanimous)	UFC Fight Night: Blaydes vs. Aspinall	23 July 2022	3	5:00	London, England	
Loss	17–6	Magomed Ankalaev	Decision (unanimous)	UFC 267	30 October 2021	3	5:00	Abu Dhabi, United Arab Emirates	
Loss	17–5	Jiří Procházka	KO (punch)	UFC 251	12 July 2020	2	0:49	Abu Dhabi, United Arab Emirates	
Win	17–4	Aleksandar Rakić	Decision (split)	UFC Fight Night: Edgar vs. The Korean Zombie	21 December 2019	3	5:00	Busan, South Korea	
Win	16–4	Ilir Latifi	KO (punches)	UFC Fight Night: Shevchenko vs. Carmouche 2	10 August 2019	2	4:31	Montevideo, Uruguay	Performance of the Night.
Loss	15–4	Dominick Reyes	Decision (split)	UFC Fight Night: Till vs. Masvidal	16 March 2019	3	5:00	London, England	
Loss	15–3	Anthony Smith	Submission (rear-naked choke)	UFC Fight Night: Volkan vs. Smith	27 October 2018	3	4:26	Moncton, New Brunswick, Canada	
Loss	15–2	Daniel Cormier	TKO (punches)	UFC 220	20 January 2018	2	2:00	Boston, Massachusetts, United States	For the UFC Light Heavyweight Championship.
Win	15–1	Jimi Manuwa	KO (punches)	UFC 214	29 July 2017	1	0:42	Anaheim, California, United States	Performance of the Night.
Win	14–1	Misha Cirkunov	KO (punch)	UFC Fight Night: Gustafsson vs. Teixeira	28 May 2017	1	0:28	Stockholm, Sweden	
Win	13–1	Ovince Saint Preux	Decision (split)	UFC Fight Night: Bermudez vs. The Korean Zombie	4 February 2017	3	5:00	Houston, Texas, United States	Return to Light Heavyweight.
Win	12–1	Alihan Vahaev	Decision (unanimous)	WFCA 17	9 April 2016	3	5:00	Grozny, Russia	2016 WFCA Heavyweight Grand Prix Quarterfinal.
Win	11–1	Paco Estevez	TKO (punches)	Strength and Honor 10	20 September 2014	1	N/A	Geneva, Switzerland	Return to Heavyweight.
Loss	10–1	Kelly Anundson	Submission (neck crank)	Bellator 115	4 April 2014	2	3:19	Reno, Nevada, United States	
Win	10–0	Josh Lanier	TKO (punches and elbows)	Bellator 105	25 October 2013	1	3:13	Rio Rancho, New Mexico, United States	
Win	9–0	David Round	TKO (punches)	WKN Valhalla: Battle of the Vikings 2013	9 March 2013	1	N/A	Aarhus, Denmark	Won the 2013 WKN Valhalla Light Heavyweight Tournament.
Win	8–0	Angelier Benjamin	KO (punches)	WKN Valhalla: Battle of the Vikings 2013	9 March 2013	1	0:45	Aarhus, Denmark	2013 WKN Valhalla Light Heavyweight Tournament Semifinal.
Win	7–0	Benyaich Mohamed	TKO (punches)	WKN Valhalla: Battle of the Vikings 2013	9 March 2013	1	0:15	Aarhus, Denmark	2013 WKN Valhalla Light Heavyweight Tournament Quarterfinal.
Win	6–0	Mohamed Amidi	TKO (punches)	Strength and Honor 6	6 October 2012	1	1:59	Geneva, Switzerland	Heavyweight debut.
Win	5–0	Bruno Farias Grancheux	TKO (punches)	Lions FC 4	15 September 2012	1	1:54	Itabuna, Brazil	
Win	4–0	Ronilson Santos	TKO (retirement)	Lions FC 3	12 May 2012	1	2:12	Itabuna, Brazil	
Win	3–0	Mamadou Cisse	Submission (kimura)	100% Fight 10	7 April 2012	1	3:43	Paris, France	
Win	2–0	Boubacar Baldé	Decision (unanimous)	Lions FC 1	15 October 2011	3	5:00	Neuchâtel, Switzerland	
Win	1–0	Martin Vath	TKO (punches)	Shooto: Switzerland 7	4 September 2010	1	0:56	Zürich, Switzerland	Light Heavyweight debut.

== Kickboxing record (incomplete) ==
Kickboxing record (Incomplete)
5 wins, 0 losses
Date	Result	Opponent	Event	Location	Method	Round	Time
2014-10-25	Win	(France) Nordine Mahieddine	SUPERKOMBAT World Grand Prix 2014 Final Elimination, Super Fight	Geneva, Switzerland	Decision (Majority)	3	3:00
2014-10-04	Win	(Switzerland) Patrick Schmid	Champions Fight Night 2	Switzerland	TKO (Doctor Stoppage)	2	N/A
2014-09-27	Win	(France) Kévin Bavelard	Jura Fight Night	Delémont, Switzerland	TKO	2	N/A
Legend: Win Loss Draw/No contest Notes
