= Alonzo Menifield =

American mixed martial arts fighter

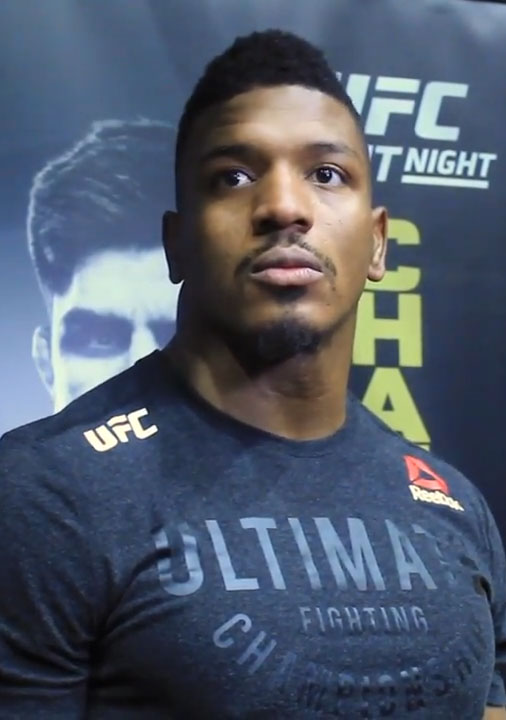
- Menifield in 2019
- Born: Alonzo Theodoro Menifield; October 18, 1987 (age 39); Los Angeles, California, U.S.
- Other names: Atomic
- Height: 6 ft 0 in (1.83 m)
- Weight: 205 lb (93 kg; 14 st 9 lb)
- Division: Heavyweight; Light Heavyweight
- Reach: 76 in (193 cm)
- Fighting out of: Dallas, Texas, U.S.
- Team: Saekson's Muay Thai (formerly); Fortis MMA
- Years active: 2015–present

Mixed martial arts record
- Total: 26
- Wins: 19
- By knockout: 11
- By submission: 3
- By decision: 5
- Losses: 6
- By knockout: 4
- By decision: 2
- Draws: 1

Other information
- Mixed martial arts record from Sherdog

Alonzo Theodoro Menifield (born October 18, 1987) is an American mixed martial artist. He currently competes in the Light Heavyweight division of the Ultimate Fighting Championship (UFC). A professional since 2015, he has formerly fought in Bellator , the Legacy Fighting Alliance and Dana White's Contender Series. As of October 24, 2026, he is #9 in the Meta UFC light heavyweight rankings.

== Background ==
Menifield was born in Los Angeles, California. After his father died, his mother raised him and his brother until the age of 14 when the boys were put in foster care. Menifield bounced around between 12 different foster homes. Menifield attended Canyon High School for only two years, but graduated and excelled at football. Menifield continued his football career at NJCAA Glendale Community College (California), where he starred as primarily a linebacker and was an Honorable Mention All-American his sophomore year as well as a member of the track and field team. After his first two seasons at Glendale, Menifield earned a scholarship to Texas A&M University–Commerce where he graduated with a degree in Criminal Justice. Menifield later played football professionally in both the CFL and Arena Football League.

== Mixed martial arts career ==
=== Early career ===
Menifield made his MMA debut at heavyweight against Zach Rosol on November 20, 2015 at Bellator 146. He won the fight via TKO in the first round.

Menifield then moved to light heavyweight and won his next two fights via TKO and KO before fighting in Dana White's Contender Series.

=== Dana White's Contender Series ===
Menifield faced UFC veteran Daniel Jolly on July 25, 2017 at Dana White's Contender Series 3. He won the fight via TKO at the end of round one due to an eye injury but failed to secure a contract with the UFC.

Menifield was provided with a second chance against Dashawn Boatwright on June 16, 2018 at Dana White's Contender Series 9. He won via TKO with ground on pound strikes within the first 8 seconds of the first round and was awarded with a UFC contract.

=== Ultimate Fighting Championship ===
Menifield made his UFC debut on January 19, 2019 against Vinicius Moreira at UFC Fight Night 143. He won the fight via TKO with punches in round one.

Menifield then faced Paul Craig on June 29, 2019 at UFC on ESPN 3. He won the fight via KO with punches in round one.

Menifield then faced Devin Clark on June 6, 2020 at UFC 250. He lost the fight via unanimous decision.

Menifield was scheduled to face Ovince Saint Preux on August 22, 2020 at UFC on ESPN 15. Just hours before the event was scheduled to begin, it was announced that the bout was canceled due to Saint Preux testing positive for COVID-19. The bout eventually took place on September 5, 2020 at UFC Fight Night 176. Menifield lost the fight via knockout in the second round.

Menifield was expected to face William Knight on February 27, 2021 at UFC Fight Night 186. However, the bout was postponed during the week leading up to the event after Menifield tested positive for COVID-19. The pairing was expected to be left intact and rescheduled for UFC 260. This time Knight was removed due to COVID-19 protocols and was replaced by promotional newcomer Fabio Cherant. At the weight-ins, Cherant weighted 206.5 pounds, half a pound over the non-title light heavyweight limit. The bout proceeded at a catchweight and he was fined 20% of his individual purse, which went to his opponent Menifield. Menifield won the fight via Von Flue choke in round one.

Menifield faced Ed Herman on August 7, 2021 at UFC 265. He won the fight via unanimous decision.

Menifield was scheduled to face William Knight on February 27, 2021 at UFC Fight Night 186. However, the bout was postponed during the week leading up to the event after Menifield testing positive for COVID-19. The pairing was expected to be left intact and rescheduled for UFC 260. This time Knight was removed due to COVID-19 protocols. The pair was rescheduled to December 4, 2021 at UFC on ESPN 31. Menifield lost the fight via unanimous decision.

Menifield was scheduled to face Nicolae Negumereanu on June 4, 2022, at UFC Fight Night 207. However, Negumereanu was removed from the event for undisclosed reasons and he was replaced by Askar Mozharov. Menifield won the fight via technical knockout in the first round.

Menifield faced Misha Cirkunov on October 15, 2022, at UFC Fight Night 212. He won the fight via knockout in round one.

Menifield faced Jimmy Crute on February 12, 2023, at UFC 284. After a point deduction in the third round due to Menifield grabbing the fence, the fight ended in a majority draw.

Menifield then faced Crute in a rematch on July 8, 2023, at UFC 290. He won the fight via a guillotine choke submission in the second round.

Menifield faced Dustin Jacoby on December 16, 2023, at UFC 296. He won the fight via unanimous decision.

Menifield next stepped in to replace Dominick Reyes against Carlos Ulberg at UFC on ESPN 54 on March 30, 2024. On February 20, 2024 it was reported that the fight was rescheduled for UFC on ESPN 56 on May 11, 2024. Menifield lost by knockout 12 seconds into the first round.

Menifield faced Azamat Murzakanov on August 3, 2024, at UFC on ABC 7. He lost the fight by knockout in the second round.

Menifield was scheduled to face Oumar Sy on March 22, 2025, at UFC Fight Night 255. However, Sy withdrew due to an injury, so Menifield instead faced promotional newcomer Julius Walker at UFC Fight Night 252 on February 22, 2025. Menifield defeated Walker by split decision. This fight earned him a Fight of the Night award.

Menifield's bout with Oumar Sy was rescheduled and took place on June 14, 2025, at UFC on ESPN 69. He won the fight by unanimous decision.

Menifield faced Volkan Oezdemir on November 22, 2025, at UFC Fight Night 265. He lost the fight by knockout in the first round.

Menifield faced Zhang Mingyang on May 30, 2026 at UFC Fight Night 277. He won the fight by technical knockout in the first round. This fight earned him a $100,000 Fight of the Night award.

Menifield faced Iwo Baraniewski on September 19, 2026 at UFC 331. He injured his thumb, leading to an open fracture but continued fighting and won the fight by split decision.

== Personal life ==
Menifield is married and has two sons; Alonzo Jr., and Zavier.

== Championships and accomplishments ==
- Ultimate Fighting Championship
  - Fight of the Night (Two times) vs. Julius Walker and Zhang Mingyang
  - Performance of the Night (One time) vs. Paul Craig

== Mixed martial arts record ==
Professional record breakdown
26 matches	19 wins	6 losses
By knockout	11	4
By submission	3	0
By decision	5	2
Draws	1	

Res.	Record	Opponent	Method	Event	Date	Round	Time	Location	Notes
Win	19–6–1	Iwo Baraniewski	Decision (split)	UFC 331	September 19, 2026	3	5:00	Los Angeles, California, United States	
Win	18–6–1	Zhang Mingyang	TKO (punches)	UFC Fight Night: Song vs. Figueiredo	May 30, 2026	1	4:15	Macau SAR, China	Fight of the Night.
Loss	17–6–1	Volkan Oezdemir	KO (knee and punches)	UFC Fight Night: Tsarukyan vs. Hooker	November 22, 2025	1	1:27	Al Rayyan, Qatar	
Win	17–5–1	Oumar Sy	Decision (unanimous)	UFC on ESPN: Usman vs. Buckley	June 14, 2025	3	5:00	Atlanta, Georgia, United States	
Win	16–5–1	Julius Walker	Decision (split)	UFC Fight Night: Cejudo vs. Song	February 22, 2025	3	5:00	Seattle, Washington, United States	Fight of the Night.
Loss	15–5–1	Azamat Murzakanov	KO (punches)	UFC on ABC: Sandhagen vs. Nurmagomedov	August 3, 2024	2	3:18	Abu Dhabi, United Arab Emirates	
Loss	15–4–1	Carlos Ulberg	KO (punches)	UFC on ESPN: Lewis vs. Nascimento	May 11, 2024	1	0:12	St. Louis, Missouri, United States	
Win	15–3–1	Dustin Jacoby	Decision (unanimous)	UFC 296	December 16, 2023	3	5:00	Las Vegas, Nevada, United States	
Win	14–3–1	Jimmy Crute	Submission (guillotine choke)	UFC 290	July 8, 2023	2	1:55	Las Vegas, Nevada, United States	
Draw	13–3–1	Jimmy Crute	Draw (majority)	UFC 284	February 12, 2023	3	5:00	Perth, Australia	Menifield was deducted 1 point in round 3 due to grabbing the fence.
Win	13–3	Misha Cirkunov	KO (punches)	UFC Fight Night: Grasso vs. Araújo	October 15, 2022	1	1:28	Las Vegas, Nevada, United States	
Win	12–3	Askar Mozharov	TKO (elbows)	UFC Fight Night: Volkov vs. Rozenstruik	June 4, 2022	1	4:40	Las Vegas, Nevada, United States	
Loss	11–3	William Knight	Decision (unanimous)	UFC on ESPN: Font vs. Aldo	December 4, 2021	3	5:00	Las Vegas, Nevada, United States	
Win	11–2	Ed Herman	Decision (unanimous)	UFC 265	August 7, 2021	3	5:00	Houston, Texas, United States	
Win	10–2	Fabio Cherant	Submission (shoulder choke)	UFC 260	March 27, 2021	1	1:11	Las Vegas, Nevada, United States	Catchweight (206.5 lb) bout; Cherant missed weight.
Loss	9–2	Ovince Saint Preux	KO (punch)	UFC Fight Night: Overeem vs. Sakai	September 5, 2020	2	4:07	Las Vegas, Nevada, United States	
Loss	9–1	Devin Clark	Decision (unanimous)	UFC 250	June 6, 2020	3	5:00	Las Vegas, Nevada, United States	
Win	9–0	Paul Craig	KO (punches)	UFC on ESPN: Ngannou vs. dos Santos	June 29, 2019	1	3:19	Minneapolis, Minnesota, United States	Performance of the Night.
Win	8–0	Vinicius Moreira	TKO (punches)	UFC Fight Night: Cejudo vs. Dillashaw	January 19, 2019	1	3:56	Brooklyn, New York, United States	
Win	7–0	Dashawn Boatwright	TKO (punches)	Dana White's Contender Series 9	June 12, 2018	1	0:08	Las Vegas, Nevada, United States	Heavyweight bout.
Win	6–0	Brice Ritani-Coe	Submission (rear-naked choke)	LFA 33	February 16, 2018	1	2:41	Dallas, Texas, United States	
Win	5–0	José Otávio Lacerda	TKO (punches)	LFA 28	December 8, 2017	2	0:32	Dallas, Texas, United States	
Win	4–0	Daniel Jolly	TKO (eye injury)	Dana White's Contender Series 3	July 25, 2017	1	5:00	Las Vegas, Nevada, United States	
Win	3–0	Khadzhimurat Bestaev	TKO (submission to punches)	LFA 13	June 2, 2017	1	4:01	Burbank, California, United States	
Win	2–0	Brock Combs	KO (punches)	RFA 43	September 9, 2016	2	0:22	Broomfield, Colorado, United States	Light Heavyweight debut.
Win	1–0	Zach Rosol	TKO (punches)	Bellator 146	November 20, 2015	1	0:38	Thackerville, Oklahoma, United States	Heavyweight debut.

== See also ==
- List of current UFC fighters
- List of Dana White's Contender Series alumni
- List of male mixed martial artists
