= UFC Fight Night: Shogun vs. Smith =

UFC mixed martial arts event in 2018

- The poster for UFC Fight Night: Shogun vs. Smith
- Promotion: Ultimate Fighting Championship
- Date: July 22, 2018
- Venue: Barclaycard Arena
- City: Hamburg, Germany
- Attendance: 7,798
- Total gate: $750,000

Event chronology
UFC Fight Night: dos Santos vs. Ivanov	UFC Fight Night: Shogun vs. Smith	UFC on Fox: Alvarez vs. Poirier 2

UFC Fight Night: Shogun vs. Smith (also known as UFC Fight Night 134) was a mixed martial arts event produced by the Ultimate Fighting Championship held on July 22, 2018, at Barclaycard Arena in Hamburg, Germany.

== Background ==
The event was the second that the promotion has held in Hamburg, following UFC Fight Night 93 in September 2016.

A light heavyweight bout between former title challenger Volkan Oezdemir and former UFC Light Heavyweight Champion Maurício Rua was expected to headline the event. The pairing was previously scheduled in the co-headliner slot at UFC Fight Night: Maia vs. Usman, but was delayed after Oezdemir was pulled from that event due to alleged visa issues stemming from a previous legal transgression, restricting his travel to Chile. The bout was again cancelled when Oezdemir was removed in favor of a bout against fellow former title challenger Alexander Gustafsson at UFC 227. He was replaced by Anthony Smith.

A bantamweight bout between Davey Grant and Manny Bermudez, was previously scheduled for UFC Fight Night: Thompson vs. Till. However, Grant pulled out of the fight after being diagnosed with a staph infection, and the bout was scrapped. The pairing was left intact and rescheduled for this event.

Ilir Latifi was scheduled to face former light heavyweight title challenger Glover Teixeira at the event. However, on July 5, it was announced that Latifi suffered an injury and was pulled from the fight. He was replaced by The Ultimate Fighter: Team Edgar vs. Team Penn light heavyweight winner Corey Anderson.

Alan Jouban was expected to face Danny Roberts at the event, but pulled out on July 12 due to a neck injury. He was replaced by promotional newcomer David Zawada.

== Results ==
Main card (Fox Sports 1)
Weight class				Method	Round	Time	Notes
Light Heavyweight	Anthony Smith	def.	Maurício Rua	KO (elbow and punches)	1	1:29
Light Heavyweight	Corey Anderson	def.	Glover Teixeira	Decision (unanimous) (30–27, 30–27, 30–27)	3	5:00
Middleweight	Abu Azaitar	def.	Vitor Miranda	Decision (unanimous) (30–27, 30–27, 29–28)	3	5:00
Heavyweight	Marcin Tybura	def.	Stefan Struve	Decision (unanimous) (30–27, 30–27, 29–28)	3	5:00
Welterweight	Danny Roberts	def.	David Zawada	Decision (split) (27–30, 29–28, 29–28)	3	5:00
Lightweight	Nasrat Haqparast	def.	Marc Diakiese	Decision (unanimous) (30–27, 30–27, 30–26)	3	5:00
Preliminary card (Fox Sports 1)
Lightweight	Damir Hadžović	def.	Nick Hein	Decision (split) (29–28, 28–29, 29–28)	3	5:00
Welterweight	Bartosz Fabiński	def.	Emil Weber Meek	Decision (unanimous) (30–27, 29–28, 29–28)	3	5:00
Featherweight	Nad Narimani	def.	Khalid Taha	Decision (unanimous) (30–27, 30–27, 30–27)	3	5:00
Light Heavyweight	Aleksandar Rakić	def.	Justin Ledet	Decision (unanimous) (30–25, 30–24, 30–24)	3	5:00
Preliminary card (UFC Fight Pass)
Bantamweight	Manny Bermudez	def.	Davey Grant	Technical Submission (triangle choke)	1	0:59
Light Heavyweight	Darko Stošić	def.	Jeremy Kimball	TKO (elbows and punches)	1	3:13
Bantamweight	Liu Pingyuan	def.	Damian Stasiak	Decision (unanimous) (30–27, 29–28, 29–28)	3	5:00

== Bonus awards ==
The following fighters earned $50,000 bonuses:

- Fight of the Night: Danny Roberts vs. David Zawada
- Performance of the Night: Anthony Smith and Manny Bermudez

== See also ==
- List of UFC events
- 2018 in UFC
- List of current UFC fighters
