= Aleksa Camur =

American mixed martial arts fighter

- Born: September 25, 1995 (age 31); Sarajevo, Bosnia and Herzegovina
- Nationality: American
- Height: 6 ft 0 in (183 cm)
- Weight: 205 lb (93 kg; 14 st 9 lb)
- Division: Light Heavyweight
- Reach: 74 in (188 cm)
- Fighting out of: Broadview Heights, Ohio
- Team: Strong Style Fight Team
- Years active: 2017–present

Mixed martial arts record
- Total: 9
- Wins: 6
- By knockout: 5
- By decision: 1
- Losses: 3
- By decision: 3

Other information
- Mixed martial arts record from Sherdog

Aleksa Camur (born September 25, 1995) is an American mixed martial artist who competed in the Light Heavyweight division of the Ultimate Fighting Championship.

== Background ==
Born in Bosnia to a Serb family, his family moved to the U.S. when he was 2. After hearing of the success a local gym had in producing talented fighters like Stipe Miocic and Jessica Eye, at the age of 16, Camur decided to go to Strong Style MMA to take some classes. He went on to win three Golden Gloves titles in Ohio.

== Mixed martial arts career ==
=== Early career ===
A professional since September 2017, Camur made his MMA debut at Iron Tiger Fight Series 76, defeating Randy Tran by knocking him out in the first round. He would go on to win his next 3 bouts on the regional scene, defeating David White at Iron Tiger Fight Series 78 via TKO in round two, then headlining Honor Fighting Championship 3, where Camur defeated Allen Bose via TKO in the first round. In his final bout on the regional scene, Camur defeated Marvin Skipper via TKO in round one at Honor FC 6.

In the main event of Dana White's Contender Series 22, Camur faced CES MMA veteran Fabio Cherant and went on to defeat him via TKO in the second round via flying knee to secure a UFC contract.

=== Ultimate Fighting Championship ===
Camur made his promotional debut against Justin Ledet on January 18, 2020, at UFC 246. He won the fight by unanimous decision.

In his sophomore performance, Camur faced William Knight at UFC 253 on September 27, 2020. For the first time in his professional career, he lost the bout via unanimous decision.

Camur faced Nicolae Negumereanu at UFC on ESPN: Jung vs. Ige on June 19, 2021. He lost the bout via split decision. Negumereanu illegally held Camur against the fence repeatedly which caused controversy.

Camur was expected to face John Allan on November 6, 2021, at UFC 268. However, Camur pulled out of the bout citing an undisclosed injury and was replaced by Dustin Jacoby.

Camur faced Tanner Boser on August 5, 2023, at UFC Fight Night 225. He lost the fight by unanimous decision.

In August 2023, it was reported that Camur was released from the UFC.

== Mixed martial arts record ==
Professional record breakdown
9 matches	6 wins	3 losses
By knockout	5	0
By decision	1	3

Res.	Record	Opponent	Method	Event	Date	Round	Time	Location	Notes
Loss	6–3	Tanner Boser	Decision (unanimous)	UFC on ESPN: Sandhagen vs. Font	August 5, 2023	3	5:00	Nashville, Tennessee, United States	
Loss	6–2	Nicolae Negumereanu	Decision (split)	UFC on ESPN: The Korean Zombie vs. Ige	June 19, 2021	3	5:00	Las Vegas, Nevada, United States	
Loss	6–1	William Knight	Decision (unanimous)	UFC 253	September 27, 2020	3	5:00	Abu Dhabi, United Arab Emirates	
Win	6–0	Justin Ledet	Decision (unanimous)	UFC 246	January 18, 2020	3	5:00	Las Vegas, Nevada, United States	
Win	5–0	Fabio Cherant	TKO (flying knee and punches)	Dana White's Contender Series 22	July 30, 2019	2	0:48	Las Vegas, Nevada, United States	
Win	4–0	Marvin Skipper	TKO (punches)	Honor FC 6	August 18, 2018	1	2:34	Cleveland, Ohio, United States	
Win	3–0	Allen Bose	TKO (punches)	Honor FC 3	March 31, 2018	1	2:04	Akron, Ohio, United States	
Win	2–0	David White	TKO (punches)	IT Fight Series 78	December 9, 2017	2	3:59	North Olmsted, Ohio, United States	
Win	1–0	Randy Tran	KO (punch)	IT Fight Series 76	September 16, 2017	1	0:20	North Olmsted, Ohio, United States	Light Heavyweight debut.

== See also ==
- List of male mixed martial artists
