= William Knight (fighter) =

American mixed martial arts fighter

- Born: William Knight; April 3, 1988 (age 38); Manchester, Connecticut, United States
- Other names: Knightmare
- Height: 5 ft 10 in (1.78 m)
- Weight: 245 lb (111 kg; 17 st 7 lb)
- Division: Heavyweight; Light Heavyweight
- Reach: 73 in (185 cm)
- Fighting out of: East Hartford, Connecticut, United States
- Team: Thornton Mixed Martial Arts
- Years active: 2018–present

Mixed martial arts record
- Total: 17
- Wins: 11
- By knockout: 9
- By decision: 2
- Losses: 6
- By knockout: 2
- By decision: 4

Other information
- Mixed martial arts record from Sherdog

William Knight (born April 3, 1988) is an American mixed martial artist who competed in the Light heavyweight division of the Ultimate Fighting Championship.

== Background ==
Knight was bullied during his youth, be it for his small stature or skin color. He was abused by his step-father and when he was 7, the state Department of Children, Youth and Families moved him and his younger brother Eric out of their family’s home and into foster care. He spent the next year with a foster family before moving in with his grandmother.

He was also put on Ritalin for ADHD, which Knight says made him even more of a target of bullying due to the medication turning him into a "zombie" and stunting his growth. His father took him off the medication, along with him starting wrestling in high school, as a turning point in his life. However when he finished high school in 2006, Knight lost direction and he "did nothing" for 10 years while playing video games, sitting on the couch, and eating unhealthily. He was almost 300 pounds with five ruptured discs in his back, when one day he was moving his high school year book and a photo from his wrestling days fell out. Seeing him back then led Knight to realize that he had to get back his 10 years. After the incident, he joined Thornton Mixed Martial Arts and Fitness in August 2015 hoping to train in Jiu-Jitsu, getting convinced to try Muay Thai.

== Mixed martial arts career ==
=== Early career ===
Knight made his amateur debut in early 2016, compiling an 8-1 record before turning professional in 2018. The highlight of his amateur career was a set of bouts against fellow future UFC heavyweight Yorgan De Castro, with Knight winning the amateur MMA fight via unanimous decision, and De Castro winning a Muay Thai bout via unanimous decision shortly before Knight turned professional.

Making his MMA debut at Reality Fighting, he faced Tom Velasquez and went on to defeat him via TKO in the first round, going on to win his next three bouts; Terrance Jean Jacques via TKO in round two at Premier FC 26, Walter Howard via TKO in the first round at Premier FC 27, and culminating with Kevin Haley via TKO in round one in his debut appearance at CES MMA 54.

Knight was invited to Dana White's Contender Series 24 on August 13, 2019 and faced Herdem Alacabek. He won the bout via TKO in the third round, and while he didn't obtain a UFC contract, he was signed to a development league contract.

For his second outing with CES MMA, Knight faced Dana White's Contender Series alum Jamelle Jones and defeated him in the first round at CES MMA 59 to earn back to back wins with CES MMA. He faced fellow future UFC fighter Tafon Nchukwi at CFFC 80 on November 22. He lost the bout in a controversial first-round stoppage, where the ref thought he was knocked out when covering up, for which the ref apologized afterwards. Knight bounced back in January 2020, defeating Rocky Edwards with a third-round TKO at CES 60 to earn a spot on season four of the Contender Series.

Knight got another chance at a UFC contract at Dana White's Contender Series 31. He faced Cody Brundage and won the bout via TKO in the first round, this time leaving with a contract to the UFC.

=== Ultimate Fighting Championship ===
Knight made his UFC debut against Aleksa Camur at UFC 253 on September 27, 2020. For the first time in his professional career, he went to the judges and won the bout via unanimous decision.

Knight stepped in on short notice to replace Shamil Gamzatov against Da Un Jung on April 10, 2021, at UFC on ABC: Vettori vs. Holland. Knight lost the bout via unanimous decision.

Knight faced Fabio Cherant on August 21, 2021, at UFC on ESPN: Cannonier vs. Gastelum. He won the fight via knockout in round one. With this win, Knight earned a Performance of the Night award.

Knight was scheduled to face Alonzo Menifield on February 27, 2021, at UFC Fight Night 186. However, the bout was postponed during the week leading up to the event after Menifield testing positive for COVID-19. The pairing was expected to be left intact and rescheduled for UFC 260. This time Knight was removed due to COVID-19 protocols. The pair was rescheduled to December 4, 2021 at UFC on ESPN 31. Knight won the fight via unanimous decision.

Knight, as a replacement for Ed Herman, faced Maxim Grishin on February 12, 2022, at UFC 271. At the weigh-ins, Knight weighed in at 218 pounds, 12 pounds over the light heavyweight non-title fight limit, marking the biggest weight miss in UFC history. As a result, the bout was shifted to heavyweight and Knight was fined 40% of his purse, which went to Grishin. Knight lost the bout via unanimous decision.

Knight faced Devin Clark on April 16, 2022, at UFC on ESPN 34. He lost the fight via technical knockout in round three.

Knight was scheduled to face Marcin Prachnio on November 19, 2022, at UFC Fight Night 215. However, the bout was scrapped the week of the event for undisclosed reasons. The bout was rescheduled for UFC Fight Night 219 on February 18, 2023. Knight lost the fight via unanimous decision.

After the loss, it was announced that Knight had fought out his contract and was not renewed.

=== Post-UFC career ===
Following his UFC release Knight faced Domingos Barros for the vacant CES MMA Heavyweight Championship on May 12, 2023 at CES 73: Knight vs. Barros. He lost the bout via majority decision.

== Personal life ==
On May 6, 2023, Knight announced that seven members of his family died before his fight against Marcin Prachnio at UFC Fight Night 215.

== Championships and accomplishments ==
=== Mixed martial arts ===
- Ultimate Fighting Championship
  - Performance of the Night (One time) vs. Fabio Cherant
- Premier FC
  - Premier FC Light Heavyweight Championship (One time)

== Mixed martial arts record ==
Professional record breakdown
17 matches	11 wins	6 losses
By knockout	9	2
By decision	2	4

Res.	Record	Opponent	Method	Event	Date	Round	Time	Location	Notes
Loss	11–6	Domingos Barros	Decision (majority)	CES 73	May 12, 2023	5	5:00	Beverly, Massachusetts, United States	Return to Heavyweight. For the vacant CES Heavyweight Championship.
Loss	11–5	Marcin Prachnio	Decision (unanimous)	UFC Fight Night: Andrade vs. Blanchfield	February 18, 2023	3	5:00	Las Vegas, Nevada, United States	
Loss	11–4	Devin Clark	TKO (elbow and punches)	UFC on ESPN: Luque vs. Muhammad 2	April 16, 2022	3	3:21	Las Vegas, Nevada, United States	Heavyweight bout.
Loss	11–3	Maxim Grishin	Decision (unanimous)	UFC 271	February 12, 2022	3	5:00	Houston, Texas, United States	Light Heavyweight bout; Knight missed weight (218 lb).
Win	11–2	Alonzo Menifield	Decision (unanimous)	UFC on ESPN: Font vs. Aldo	December 4, 2021	3	5:00	Las Vegas, Nevada, United States	
Win	10–2	Fabio Cherant	KO (punches)	UFC on ESPN: Cannonier vs. Gastelum	August 21, 2021	1	3:58	Las Vegas, Nevada, United States	Performance of the Night.
Loss	9–2	Da Un Jung	Decision (unanimous)	UFC on ABC: Vettori vs. Holland	April 10, 2021	3	5:00	Las Vegas, Nevada, United States	
Win	9–1	Aleksa Camur	Decision (unanimous)	UFC 253	September 27, 2020	3	5:00	Abu Dhabi, United Arab Emirates	
Win	8–1	Cody Brundage	TKO (elbows and punches)	Dana White's Contender Series 31	September 1, 2020	1	2:23	Las Vegas, Nevada, United States	
Win	7–1	Rocky Edwards	TKO (punches)	CES 60	January 24, 2020	3	2:56	Lincoln, Rhode Island, United States	Return to Light Heavyweight.
Loss	6–1	Tafon Nchukwi	TKO (punches)	CFFC 80	November 22, 2019	1	2:30	Hampton, Virginia, United States	Catchweight (225 lb) bout.
Win	6–0	Jamelle Jones	TKO (submission to punches)	CES 59	October 25, 2019	1	4:27	Lincoln, Rhode Island, United States	Heavyweight debut.
Win	5–0	Herdem Alacabek	TKO (punches)	Dana White's Contender Series 24	August 13, 2019	3	4:34	Las Vegas, Nevada, United States	
Win	4–0	Kevin Haley	TKO (submission to punches)	CES 54	January 19, 2019	1	3:33	Lincoln, Rhode Island, United States	
Win	3–0	Walter Howard	TKO (punches)	Premier FC 27	November 10, 2018	1	3:12	Westfield, Massachusetts, United States	Won the Premier FC Light Heavyweight Championship.
Win	2–0	Terrance Jean-Jacques	TKO (punches)	Premier FC 26	June 16, 2018	2	2:35	Springfield, Massachusetts, United States	
Win	1–0	Tom Velazquez	TKO (punches)	Reality Fighting	May 4, 2018	1	2:08	Uncasville, Connecticut, United States	

== See also ==
- List of male mixed martial artists
