= Dana White's Contender Series season 3 =

UFC mixed martial arts event in 2019

Dana White's Contender Series
- Season 3

Release
- Original network: ESPN+
- Original release: June 18 – August 27, 2019

Season chronology
- ← Previous; Season 2 Next → Season 4

In May 2018 it was confirmed that season 3 of Dana White's Contender Series would commence in June 2019 and in the US would be exclusive to ESPN+, ESPN's new over-the-top subscription package. In April 2019, the schedule was elaborated, the series beginning on June 18, 2019 and ending on August 20, 2019. The promotion's name also got shortened from Dana White's Tuesday Night Contender Series to Dana White's Contender Series.

== Week 1 - June 18 ==
Dana White's Contender Series 17
- Promotion: DWCS
- Date: June 18, 2019
- Venue: UFC Apex Centre
- City: Las Vegas, Nevada, United States

Main Card
Weight class				Method	Round	Time	Notes
Middleweight	Punahele Soriano	def.	Jamie Pickett	Decision (unanimous) (30–27, 30–27, 30–26)	3	5:00
Women's Strawweight	Hannah Goldy	def.	Kali Robbins	Decision (unanimous) (30–27, 30–27, 30–26)	3	5:00
Featherweight	Brendan Loughnane	def.	Bill Algeo	Decision (unanimous) (30–27, 30–27, 30–27)	3	5:00
Heavyweight	Yorgan De Castro	def.	Alton Meeks	TKO (leg kick and punches)	1	4:45

=== Contract awards ===
The following fighters were awarded contracts with the UFC:

- Punahele Soriano and Yorgan De Castro

== Week 2 - June 25 ==
Dana White's Contender Series 18
- Promotion: DWCS
- Date: June 25, 2019
- Venue: UFC Apex Centre
- City: Las Vegas, Nevada, United States

Main Card
Weight class				Method	Round	Time	Notes
Light Heavyweight	Tony Johnson	def.	Alton Cunningham	Decision (unanimous) (29–28, 29–28, 29–28)	3	5:00
Featherweight	Justin Gonzales	def.	Zach Zane	Decision (unanimous) (30–26, 30–26, 30–26)	3	5:00
Middleweight	Kyle Daukaus	def.	Michael Lombardo	Decision (unanimous) (30–25, 30–26, 29–27)	3	5:00
Bantamweight	Miles Johns	def.	Richie Santiago	Decision (unanimous) (30–27, 30–27, 30–26)	3	5:00
Catchweight (178 lbs)	Miguel Baeza	def.	Victor Reyna	Decision (unanimous) (29–28, 29–28, 29–28)	3	5:00	(Note: Originally a welterweight bout; Reyna missed weight.)

=== Contract awards ===
The following fighters were awarded contracts with the UFC:

- Miles Johns and Miguel Baeza

== Week 3 - July 9 ==
Dana White's Contender Series 19
- Promotion: DWCS
- Date: July 9, 2019
- Venue: UFC Apex Centre
- City: Las Vegas, Nevada, United States

Main Card
Weight class				Method	Round	Time	Notes
Lightweight	Joe Solecki	def.	Jesse Wallace	Submission (guillotine choke)	1	3:49
Light Heavyweight	Antonio Trócoli	vs.	Kenneth Bergh	No Contest (overturned by NSAC)	1	3:57	(Note: Originally a submission (neck crank) win for Trocoli; overturned after he tested positive for nandrolone.)
Bantamweight	Hunter Azure	def.	Chris Ocon	Decision (unanimous) (30–27, 30–27, 30–26)	3	5:00
Middleweight	Maki Pitolo	def.	Justin Sumter	TKO (punches)	1	1:37
Lightweight	Jonathan Pearce	def.	Jacob Rosales	TKO (punch)	3	1:50

=== Contract awards ===
The following fighters were awarded contracts with the UFC:

- Joe Solecki, António Trocoli, Hunter Azure, Maki Pitolo, and Jonathan Pearce

== Week 4 - July 16 ==
Dana White's Contender Series 20
- Promotion: DWCS
- Date: July 16, 2019
- Venue: UFC Apex Centre
- City: Las Vegas, Nevada, United States

Main Card
Weight class				Method	Round	Time	Notes
Middleweight	Antônio Arroyo	def.	Stephen Regman	Submission (arm-triangle choke)	2	3:31
Bantamweight	Ode' Osbourne	def.	Armando Villarreal	Submission (armbar)	1	4:39
Heavyweight	Don'Tale Mayes	def.	Ricardo Prasel	TKO (punches)	1	4:49
Catchweight (152.5 lbs)	Kevin Syler	def.	Lance Lawrence	Decision (unanimous) (30–27, 30–26, 30–26)	3	5:00	(Note: Originally a featherweight bout; Syler missed weight.)
Middleweight	Brendan Allen	def.	Aaron Jeffery	Submission (rear-naked choke)	1	3:23

=== Contract awards ===
The following fighters were awarded contracts with the UFC:

- Antônio Arroyo, Ode' Osbourne, Don'Tale Mayes, and Brendan Allen

== Week 5 - July 23 ==
Dana White's Contender Series 21
- Promotion: DWCS
- Date: July 23, 2019
- Venue: UFC Apex Centre
- City: Las Vegas, Nevada, United States

Main Card
Weight class				Method	Round	Time	Notes
Middleweight	Ramazan Kuramagomedov	def.	Jordan Williams	Decision (split) (27–30, 29–28, 29–28)	3	5:00
Featherweight	Sean Woodson	def.	Terrance McKinney	KO (flying knee)	2	1:49
Lightweight	J.J. Okanovich	def.	Christian Lohsen	Decision (unanimous) (30–27, 30–27, 30–27)	3	5:00
Light Heavyweight	Jamahal Hill	def.	Alexander Poppeck	TKO (punches and elbows)	2	4:29
Featherweight	Billy Quarantillo	def.	Kamuela Kirk	TKO (punches)	3	0:22

=== Contract awards ===
The following fighters were awarded contracts with the UFC:

- Sean Woodson, Jamahal Hill, and Billy Quarantillo

== Week 6 - July 30 ==
Dana White's Contender Series 22
- Promotion: DWCS
- Date: July 30, 2019
- Venue: UFC Apex Centre
- City: Las Vegas, Nevada, United States

Main Card
Weight class				Method	Round	Time	Notes
Light Heavyweight	Aleksa Camur	def.	Fabio Cherant	TKO (flying knee and punches)	2	0:48
Featherweight	Aalon Cruz	def.	Steven Nguyen	KO (flying knee)	3	4:36
Women's Flyweight	Tracy Cortez	def.	Mariya Agapova	Decision (unanimous) (30–26, 30–26, 29–27)	3	5:00
Welterweight	Daniel Rodriguez	def.	Rico Farrington	Decision (unanimous) (30–27, 29–28, 29–28)	3	5:00
Heavyweight	Rodrigo Nascimento	def.	Michal Martínek	Submission (arm-triangle choke)	1	3:16

=== Contract awards ===
The following fighters were awarded contracts with the UFC:

- Aleksa Camur, Aalon Cruz, Tracy Cortez, and Rodrigo Nascimento

== Week 7 - August 6 ==
Dana White's Contender Series 23
- Promotion: DWCS
- Date: August 6, 2019
- Venue: UFC Apex Centre
- City: Las Vegas, Nevada, United States

Main Card
Weight class				Method	Round	Time	Notes
Lightweight	Omar Morales	def.	Harvey Park	TKO (leg kicks and punches)	2	1:06
Women's Flyweight	Lucrezia Ria	def.	Marilia Santos	Decision (split) (27–30, 29–28, 29–28)	3	5:00
Featherweight	Herbert Burns	def.	Darrick Minner	Submission (triangle armbar)	1	2:29
Middleweight	André Muniz	def.	Taylor Johnson	Submission (rear-naked choke)	1	1:46
Bantamweight	Dwight Joseph	def.	Jay Perrin	Decision (unanimous) (29–28, 29–28, 29–28)	3	5:00

=== Contract awards ===
The following fighters were awarded contracts with the UFC:

- Omar Morales, Herbert Burns, and André Muniz

== Week 8 - August 13 ==
Dana White's Contender Series 24
- Promotion: DWCS
- Date: August 13, 2019
- Venue: UFC Apex Centre
- City: Las Vegas, Nevada, United States

Main Card
Weight class				Method	Round	Time	Notes
Light Heavyweight	William Knight	def.	Herdem Alacabek	TKO (punches)	3	4:34
Welterweight	Brok Weaver	def.	Devin Smyth	Decision (unanimous) (30–27, 29–28, 29–28)	3	5:00
Women's Bantamweight	Sarah Alpar	def.	Shanna Young	Submission (rear-naked choke)	2	2:55
Bantamweight	Tony Gravely	def.	Ray Rodriguez	TKO (punches)	3	2:16
Light Heavyweight	Julius Anglickas	def.	Karl Reed	Submission (rear-naked choke)	3	3:25

=== Contract awards ===
The following fighters were awarded contracts with the UFC:

- Brok Weaver, Sarah Alpar, and Tony Gravely
- William Knight was signed to a development league contract

== Week 9 - August 20 ==
Dana White's Contender Series 25
- Promotion: DWCS
- Date: August 20, 2019
- Venue: UFC Apex Centre
- City: Las Vegas, Nevada, United States

Main Card
Weight class				Method	Round	Time	Notes
Welterweight	Philip Rowe	def.	Leon Shahbazyan	TKO (punches)	3	0:16
Light Heavyweight	Jamal Pogues	def.	Marcos Brigagão	Decision (unanimous) (30–27, 30–27, 30–27)	3	5:00
Catchweight (139 lbs)	Steve Garcia	def.	Desmond Torres	TKO (punches and elbows)	1	4:35	(Note: Originally a bantamweight bout; Garcia missed weight.)
Women's Strawweight	Mallory Martin	def.	Micol Di Segni	Decision (unanimous) (30–27, 30–27, 29–28)	3	5:00
Bantamweight	Ricky Steele	def.	Phil Caracappa	Decision (split) (29–28, 28–29, 29–28)	3	5:00

=== Contract awards ===
The following fighters were awarded contracts with the UFC:

- Philip Rowe

== Week 10 - August 27 ==
Dana White's Contender Series 26
- Promotion: DWCS
- Date: August 27, 2019
- Venue: UFC Apex Centre
- City: Las Vegas, Nevada, United States

Main Card
Weight class				Method	Round	Time	Notes
Middleweight	Duško Todorović	def.	Teddy Ash	Decision (unanimous) (30–27, 29–28, 29–28)	3	5:00
Middleweight	Impa Kasanganay	def.	Kailan Hill	Decision (unanimous) (30–27, 30–27, 30–27)	3	5:00
Lightweight	Peter Barrett	def.	Sang Hoon Yoo	Decision (unanimous) (29–28, 29–28, 29–28)	3	5:00
Heavyweight	Ben Sosoli	vs.	Dustin Joynson	NC (accidental eye poke)	1	2:08
Featherweight	T.J. Brown	def.	Dylan Lockard	Submission (arm-triangle choke)	3	2:59	(Note: Brown was deducted one point in round 1 due to an illegal kick.)

=== Contract awards ===
The following fighters were awarded contracts with the UFC:

- Duško Todorović, Peter Barrett, and T.J. Brown
