= UFC Fight Night: Edwards vs. Brady =

2025 mixed martial arts event in London

- The poster for UFC Fight Night: Edwards vs. Brady
- Promotion: Ultimate Fighting Championship
- Date: March 22, 2025
- Venue: The O_{2} Arena
- City: London, England
- Attendance: 18,583
- Total gate: $4,711,410

Event chronology
UFC Fight Night: Vettori vs. Dolidze 2	UFC Fight Night: Edwards vs. Brady	UFC on ESPN: Moreno vs. Erceg

UFC Fight Night: Edwards vs. Brady (also known as UFC Fight Night 255 and UFC on ESPN+ 113) was a mixed martial arts event produced by the Ultimate Fighting Championship that took place on March 22, 2025, at The O_{2} Arena in London, England.

== Background ==
The event marked the promotion's 16th visit to London and first since UFC Fight Night: Aspinall vs. Tybura in July 2023.

A welterweight bout between former UFC Welterweight Champion Leon Edwards and Jack Della Maddalena was originally scheduled to headline the event. However, Della Maddalena was pulled from the contest in order to face current welterweight champion Belal Muhammad at UFC 315 and was replaced by Sean Brady.

A light heavyweight bout between Alonzo Menifield and Oumar Sy was scheduled for this event. However, Sy withdrew from the fight due to an injury, so Menifield was moved to UFC Fight Night: Cejudo vs. Song in February against promotional newcomer Julius Walker.

A women's strawweight bout between Molly McCann and Istela Nunes was scheduled for this event. However, Nunes withdrew from the fight for unknown reasons and was replaced by promotional newcomer Alexia Thainara.

== Results ==
Main card (ESPN+)
Weight class				Method	Round	Time	Notes
Welterweight	Sean Brady	def.	Leon Edwards	Submission (guillotine choke)	4	1:39
Light Heavyweight	Carlos Ulberg	def.	Jan Błachowicz	Decision (unanimous) (29–28, 29–28, 29–28)	3	5:00
Welterweight	Kevin Holland	def.	Gunnar Nelson	Decision (unanimous) (29–28, 29–28, 29–28)	3	5:00
Women's Strawweight	Alexia Thainara	def.	Molly McCann	Submission (rear-naked choke)	1	4:32
Lightweight	Chris Duncan	def.	Jordan Vucenic	Submission (guillotine choke)	2	3:42
Featherweight	Nathaniel Wood	def.	Morgan Charrière	Decision (unanimous) (30–27, 30–27, 30–27)	3	5:00
Preliminary card (ESPN+)
Lightweight	Chris Padilla	def.	Jai Herbert	Decision (split) (29–28, 28–29, 29–28)	3	5:00
Flyweight	Lone'er Kavanagh	def.	Felipe dos Santos	Decision (unanimous) (29–28, 29–28, 29–28)	3	5:00
Heavyweight	Marcin Tybura	def.	Mick Parkin	Decision (unanimous) (29–28, 29–28, 29–28)	3	5:00
Middleweight	Christian Leroy Duncan	def.	Andrey Pulyaev	Decision (unanimous) (30–27, 30–27, 30–26)	3	5:00
Women's Strawweight	Shauna Bannon	def.	Puja Tomar	Submission (armbar)	2	3:22
Bantamweight	Caolán Loughran	def.	Nathan Fletcher	Decision (split) (29–28, 29–28, 28–29)	3	5:00
Lightweight	Kauê Fernandes	def.	Guram Kutateladze	Decision (unanimous) (30–27, 30–27, 30–27)	3	5:00

== Bonus awards ==
The following fighters received $50,000 bonuses.

- Fight of the Night: No bonus awarded.
- Performance of the Night: Sean Brady, Kevin Holland, Alexia Thainara, and Shauna Bannon

== See also ==
- List of UFC events
- List of current UFC fighters
- 2025 in UFC
