= Carlos Ulberg =

New Zealand mixed martial artist (born 1990)

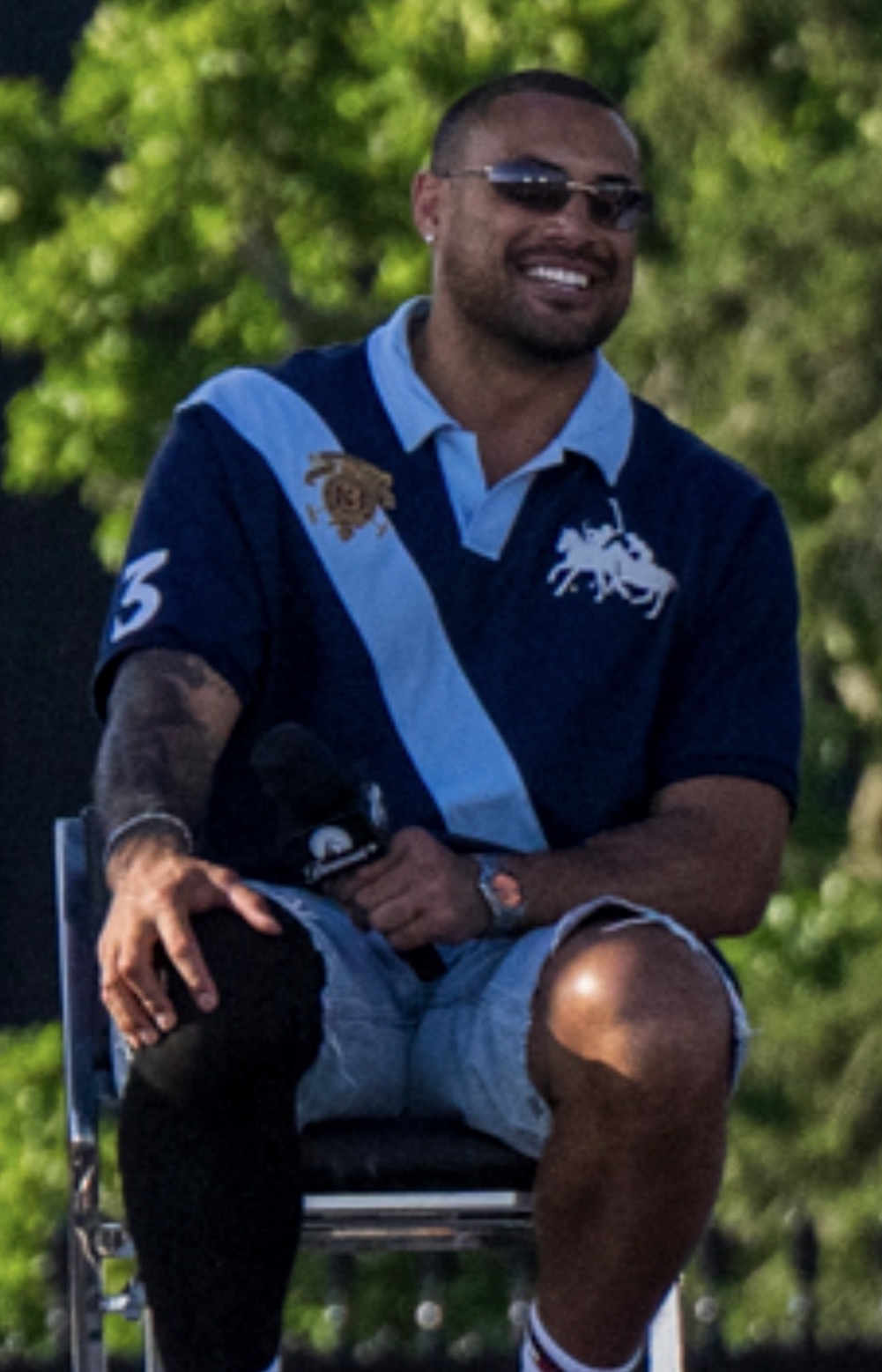
- Ulberg in 2026
- Born: Carlos Sao Murry Ulberg; 17 November 1990 (age 35); Auckland, New Zealand
- Nickname: Black Jag
- Height: 6 ft 4 in (1.93 m)
- Weight: 205 lb (93 kg; 14 st 9 lb)
- Division: Light heavyweight
- Reach: 77 in (196 cm)
- Style: Kickboxing
- Fighting out of: Auckland, New Zealand
- Team: City Kickboxing
- Years active: 2011–present

Professional boxing record
- Total: 1
- Wins: 1

Kickboxing record
- Total: 21
- Wins: 19
- By knockout: 12
- Losses: 2

Mixed martial arts record
- Total: 15
- Wins: 14
- By knockout: 9
- By submission: 1
- By decision: 4
- Losses: 1
- By knockout: 1

Other information
- Boxing record from BoxRec
- Mixed martial arts record from Sherdog

Carlos Sao Murry Ulberg (born 17 November 1990) is a New Zealand professional mixed martial artist and former kickboxer. He currently competes in the light heavyweight division of the Ultimate Fighting Championship (UFC), where he is the current UFC Light Heavyweight champion. As of September 22, 2026, he is #15 in the UFC men's pound-for-pound rankings.

== Background ==
Ulberg was born in New Zealand to parents of Samoan, Māori and German descent. His father was a boxer who represented Samoa at the Commonwealth Games. He was raised by a foster family in South Auckland from the age of four and attended Sir Edmund Hillary Collegiate. Ulberg began playing rugby league as a child, a sport in which he would later compete at the semi-professional level when he became a Counties-Manukau representative. He was a contestant on the Game of Bros reality television show in 2018 and was twice offered the opportunity to star in New Zealand's version of The Bachelor.

Ulberg works part-time as a model.

== Professional boxing career ==
In August 2015, Ulberg fought in his first and only professional boxing fight, with his stable mate Sam Rapira main eventing the card. He took on Daniel Meehan. Ulberg won the fight by unanimous decision.

== Mixed martial arts career ==
=== Early career ===
Ulberg made his MMA debut in 2011 for the King of the Door promotion when he faced Kaota Puna and secured a second-round knockout in his first professional fight.

=== Dana White's Contender Series ===
Ulberg competed at Dana White's Contender Series 34 on 4 November 2020 and earned himself a UFC contract via a first-round knockout of Bruno Oliveira.

=== Ultimate Fighting Championship ===
Ulberg made his UFC debut on 6 March 2021 at UFC 259 where he faced Kennedy Nzechukwu. Ulberg had Nzechukwu in trouble early with a flurry of strikes, but quickly became exhausted and ultimately lost the fight via knockout in the second round. This fight earned him the Fight of the Night award.

Ulberg faced Fabio Cherant on 12 February 2022 at UFC 271. He won the fight via unanimous decision.

Ulberg faced Tafon Nchukwi on 25 June 2022, at UFC on ESPN: Tsarukyan vs. Gamrot. He won via TKO in the first round.

Ulberg faced Nicolae Negumereanu on 12 November 2022, at UFC 281. He won the fight via knockout in the first round.

Ulberg faced Ihor Potieria on 13 May 2023, at UFC on ABC 4. He won the fight via technical knockout in the first round. This win earned him the Performance of the Night award.

Ulberg faced Da Un Jung on 10 September 2023, at UFC 293. He won the fight via a rear-naked choke submission in round three.

Ulberg was scheduled to face Dominick Reyes on 20 January 2024, at UFC 297. However, in late December 2023, it was announced that match was off due to an injury sustained by Ulberg. The pair was rescheduled to meet at UFC on ESPN 54 on 30 March 2024. However, on 23 January it was announced that Reyes had withdrawn from the fight and was replaced by Alonzo Menifield. On 20 February 2024 it was reported that the fight against Menifield was rescheduled for UFC on ESPN 56 on 11 May 2024. Ulberg knocked out Menifield 12 seconds into the first round. This fight earned him another Performance of the Night award.

Ulberg was scheduled to replace Khalil Rountree Jr., and face former UFC Light Heavyweight champion Jamahal Hill on 29 June 2024, at UFC 303. However, Hill withdrew due to injury, and was replaced by Anthony Smith. Subsequently, one week before the event, Ulberg pulled out of the bout due to injury and was replaced by Roman Dolidze.

Ulberg faced Volkan Oezdemir on November 23, 2024, at UFC Fight Night 248. He won the fight by unanimous decision.

Ulberg faced former UFC Light Heavyweight champion Jan Błachowicz on March 22, 2025 at UFC Fight Night 255. He won the close fight by unanimous decision. Eight out of 12 media outlets scored the bout for Ulberg.

Ulberg faced former UFC Light Heavyweight championship challenger Dominick Reyes in the main event on 28 September 2025 at UFC Fight Night 260. He won the fight via knockout in round one. This fight earned him another Performance of the Night award.

Ulberg faced former UFC Light Heavyweight champion Jiří Procházka in the main event of UFC 327 on 11 April 2026, in Miami, Florida for the vacant UFC Light Heavyweight Championship. He won the championship by knockout in the first round despite suffering a leg injury during the bout. This fight earned him a $100,000 Performance of the Night award.

On 18 April 2026, it was reported that Ulberg tore his ACL and will be sidelined from competition for an undetermined amount of time.

== Championships and accomplishments ==
=== Mixed martial arts ===
- Ultimate Fighting Championships
  - UFC Light Heavyweight championship (One time, Current)
    - First UFC Light Heavyweight Champion from New Zealand
  - Fight of the Night (One time) vs. Kennedy Nzechukwu
  - Performance of the Night (Four times) vs. Ihor Potieria, Alonzo Menifield, Dominick Reyes and Jiří Procházka
  - Second-longest win streak in UFC Light Heavyweight division history (10) (behind Jon Jones)
  - Most significant strikes per minute in UFC Light Heavyweight division history (6.58)
  - Second-lowest bottom position time in UFC Light Heavyweight division history (0:13)
    - Second-lowest bottom position percentage in UFC Light Heavyweight division history (0.27%)
  - Third-highest striking differential in UFC Light Heavyweight division history (2.53)
  - Fourth-fastest knockout/finish in UFC Light Heavyweight division history (0:12 vs. Alonzo Menifield)
  - Fourth-latest submission/finish in UFC Light Heavyweight division history (4:49 R3 vs. Da Woon Jung)

=== Kickboxing ===
- King in the Ring
  - 2017 King in the Ring 100 kg Tournament champion
  - 2019 King in the Ring 92 kg Tournament champion

== Mixed martial arts record ==
Professional record breakdown
| 15 matches | 14 wins | 1 loss |
| By knockout | 9 | 1 |
| By submission | 1 | 0 |
| By decision | 4 | 0 |

| Res. | Record | Opponent | Method | Event | Date | Round | Time | Location | Notes |
|---|---|---|---|---|---|---|---|---|---|
| Win | 14–1 | Jiří Procházka | KO (punches) | UFC 327 | 11 April 2026 | 1 | 3:45 | Miami, Florida, United States | Won the vacant UFC Light Heavyweight Championship. Performance of the Night. |
| Win | 13–1 | Dominick Reyes | KO (punches) | UFC Fight Night: Ulberg vs. Reyes | 28 September 2025 | 1 | 4:27 | Perth, Australia | Performance of the Night. |
| Win | 12–1 | Jan Błachowicz | Decision (unanimous) | UFC Fight Night: Edwards vs. Brady | 22 March 2025 | 3 | 5:00 | London, England | |
| Win | 11–1 | Volkan Oezdemir | Decision (unanimous) | UFC Fight Night: Yan vs. Figueiredo | 23 November 2024 | 3 | 5:00 | Macau SAR, China | |
| Win | 10–1 | Alonzo Menifield | KO (punches) | UFC on ESPN: Lewis vs. Nascimento | 11 May 2024 | 1 | 0:12 | St. Louis, Missouri, United States | Performance of the Night. |
| Win | 9–1 | Jung Da-un | Submission (rear-naked choke) | UFC 293 | 10 September 2023 | 3 | 4:49 | Sydney, Australia | |
| Win | 8–1 | Ihor Potieria | TKO (punches) | UFC on ABC: Rozenstruik vs. Almeida | 13 May 2023 | 1 | 2:09 | Charlotte, North Carolina, United States | Performance of the Night. |
| Win | 7–1 | Nicolae Negumereanu | KO (punches) | UFC 281 | 12 November 2022 | 1 | 3:44 | New York City, New York, United States | |
| Win | 6–1 | Tafon Nchukwi | TKO (punches) | UFC on ESPN: Tsarukyan vs. Gamrot | 25 June 2022 | 1 | 1:15 | Las Vegas, Nevada, United States | |
| Win | 5–1 | Fabio Cherant | Decision (unanimous) | UFC 271 | 12 February 2022 | 3 | 5:00 | Houston, Texas, United States | |
| Loss | 4–1 | Kennedy Nzechukwu | KO (punches) | UFC 259 | 6 March 2021 | 2 | 3:19 | Las Vegas, Nevada, United States | Fight of the Night. |
| Win | 4–0 | Bruno Oliveira | KO (punches) | Dana White's Contender Series 34 | 4 November 2020 | 1 | 2:02 | Las Vegas, Nevada, United States | Return to Light Heavyweight. |
| Win | 3–0 | John Martin Fraser | Decision (unanimous) | Eternal MMA 40 | 8 December 2018 | 3 | 5:00 | Perth, Australia | Heavyweight debut. |
| Win | 2–0 | Umed Rakhmatulloyev | TKO (punches and knee) | World Kings Glory MMA 3 | 25 August 2016 | 1 | 3:03 | Harbin, China | |
| Win | 1–0 | Kaota Puna | TKO (punches) | King of the Door: Submission 2 | 26 August 2011 | 2 | N/A | Auckland, New Zealand | Light Heavyweight debut. |

== Kickboxing record (partial) ==
Professional kickboxing record
19 wins (12 (T)KOs, 2 losses
| Date | Result | Opponent | Event | Location | Method | Round | Time |
| 2019-03-30 | Win | (New Zealand) Fou Ah-Lam | King in the Ring 92 kg II, Final | Auckland, New Zealand | KO (low kick) | 2 | 1:28 |
Wins King in the Ring 92 kg II Tournament title
| 2019-03-30 | Win | (New Zealand) Nato La'auli | King in the Ring 92 kg II, Semi Final | Auckland, New Zealand | KO (kick to the body) | 3 | 1:54 |
| 2019-03-30 | Win | (New Zealand) Julius Poananga | King in the Ring 92 kg II, Quarter-Final | Auckland, New Zealand | TKO (punches and knees) | 3 | 0:48 |
| 2018-07-28 | Win | (Portugal) Bruno Susano | EM Legend 32 | Chengdu, China | Decision (unanimous) | 3 | 3:00 |
| 2018-04-21 | Win | (Ukraine) Oleg Pryimachov | EM Legend 30 | Emei, China | Decision (unanimous) | 3 | 3:00 |
| 2018-01-20 | Loss | (Ukraine) Oleg Pryimachov | EM Legend 27 | Kunming, China | Decision (unanimous) | 3 | 3:00 |
| 2017-09-29 | Win | (Ukraine) Stanislav | EM Legend 23 | Yilong, China | TKO (corner stoppage) | 2 | 0:34 |
| 2017-06-30 | Win | (New Zealand) Nato Laauli | King in the Ring 100kg III, Final | Auckland, New Zealand | TKO (punches) | 2 | 0:41 |
Wins King in the Ring 100 kg III Tournament title
| 2017-06-30 | Win | (New Zealand) Ata Fakalelu | King in the Ring 100kg III, Semi Final | Auckland, New Zealand | Decision (majority) | 3 | 3:00 |
| 2017-06-30 | Win | (New Zealand) Tafa Misipati | King in the Ring 100kg III, Quarter Final | Auckland, New Zealand | KO (front kick) | 2 | 1:52 |
| 2017-03-31 | Win | (United States) Jake Heun | EM Legend 17 | Emei, China | Decision (unanimous) | 3 | 3:00 |
| 2016-12-23 | Win | (Belarus) Sherzad Babazhanau | EM Legend 15 | Emei, China | TKO (retirement) | 2 | 2:30 |
| 2016-09-23 | Loss | (Lithuania) Sergej Maslobojev | EM Legend 12 | Chengdu, China | TKO (Low kicks) | 3 | 2:31 |
Legend: Win Loss Draw/no contest Notes

== Professional boxing record ==
| 1 fight | 1 win | 0 losses |
|---|---|---|
| By decision | 1 | 0 |

| No. | Result | Record | Opponent | Type | Round, time | Date | Location | Notes |
|---|---|---|---|---|---|---|---|---|
| 1 | Win | 1–0 | Daniel Meehan | UD | 4 (4) | 22 Aug 2015 | TSB Stadium, New Plymouth, New Zealand | |

== See also ==
- List of current UFC fighters
- List of Dana White's Contender Series alumni
- List of male mixed martial artists

Awards and achievements
| Vacant Title last held by Alex Pereira | 22nd UFC Light Heavyweight Champion; 11 April 2026 – present | Incumbent |
