= UFC 246 =

UFC mixed martial arts event in 2020

UFC 246: McGregor vs. Cowboy
- The poster for UFC 246: McGregor vs. Cowboy
- Promotion: Ultimate Fighting Championship
- Date: January 18, 2020
- Venue: T-Mobile Arena
- City: Paradise, Nevada, United States
- Attendance: 19,040
- Total gate: $11,087,629.33
- Buyrate: 1,353,429

Event chronology
UFC Fight Night: Edgar vs. The Korean Zombie	UFC 246: McGregor vs. Cowboy	UFC Fight Night: Blaydes vs. dos Santos

UFC 246: McGregor vs. Cowboy was a mixed martial arts event produced by the Ultimate Fighting Championship that took place on January 18, 2020, at the T-Mobile Arena in Paradise, Nevada, part of the Las Vegas Metropolitan Area, United States.

== Background ==
A welterweight bout between former UFC Featherweight and Lightweight Champion Conor McGregor and former lightweight title challenger Donald Cerrone served as the event headliner.

A women's bantamweight rematch between former UFC Women's Bantamweight Champion Holly Holm and former title challenger Raquel Pennington was initially scheduled to take place at UFC 243. The pairing previously met in February 2015 at UFC 184, with Holm winning the encounter via split decision. However, it was revealed on September 27, 2019 that Holm withdrew from the bout due to a hamstring injury and the bout was cancelled. The bout was rescheduled and took place at this event.

Grant Dawson was expected to face Chas Skelly in a featherweight bout at the event. However, the bout was scrapped on January 14 after Dawson announced that he was forced to withdraw.

Former UFC Women's Strawweight Championship challenger Cláudia Gadelha was expected to face Alexa Grasso at the event. However, on the day of the weigh-ins, Grasso weighed in at 121.5 pounds, 5.5 pounds over the strawweight non-title fight limit of 116 pounds. The Nevada State Athletic Commission (NSAC) decided to remove the fight because competitors are not allowed to compete if the weight between them is over 3 pounds.

== Results ==
Main Card
Weight class				Method	Round	Time	Notes
Welterweight	Conor McGregor	def.	Donald Cerrone	TKO (head kick and punches)	1	0:40
Women's Bantamweight	Holly Holm	def.	Raquel Pennington	Decision (unanimous) (29–28, 30–27, 30–27)	3	5:00
Heavyweight	Aleksei Oleinik	def.	Maurice Greene	Submission (armbar)	2	4:38
Bantamweight	Brian Kelleher	def.	Ode' Osbourne	Submission (guillotine choke)	1	2:49
Lightweight	Carlos Diego Ferreira	def.	Anthony Pettis	Submission (rear-naked choke)	2	1:46
Preliminary card (ESPN)
Women's Flyweight	Roxanne Modafferi	def.	Maycee Barber	Decision (unanimous) (30–27, 30–27, 30–26)	3	5:00
Featherweight	Sodiq Yusuff	def.	Andre Fili	Decision (unanimous) (29–28, 29–28, 29–28)	3	5:00
Flyweight	Askar Askarov	def.	Tim Elliott	Decision (unanimous) (29–28, 30–27, 30–27)	3	5:00
Lightweight	Drew Dober	def.	Nasrat Haqparast	KO (punches)	1	1:10
Early Preliminary card (UFC Fight Pass)
Light Heavyweight	Aleksa Camur	def.	Justin Ledet	Decision (unanimous) (29–28, 30–27, 30–27)	3	5:00
Women's Flyweight	Sabina Mazo	def.	JJ Aldrich	Decision (split) (28–29, 29–28, 29–28)	3	5:00

== Bonus awards ==
The following fighters received $50,000 bonuses.

- Fight of the Night: No bonus awarded.
- Performance of the Night: Conor McGregor, Aleksei Oleinik, Brian Kelleher, Carlos Diego Ferreira and Drew Dober

== Reported payout ==
The following is the reported payout to the fighters as reported to the Nevada State Athletic Commission (NSAC). It does not include sponsor money and also does not include the UFC's traditional "fight night" bonuses. The total disclosed payout for the event was $4,434,000.

- Conor McGregor: $3,000,000 (no win bonus) def. Donald Cerrone: $200,000
- Holly Holm: $200,000 (includes $50,000 win bonus) def. Raquel Pennington: $63,000
- Aleksei Oleinik: $150,000 (includes $75,000 win bonus) def. Maurice Greene: $30,000
- Brian Kelleher: $46,000 (includes $23,000 win bonus) def. Ode' Osborne: $10,000
- Carlos Diego Ferreira: $100,000 (includes $50,000 win bonus) def. Anthony Pettis: $155,000
- Roxanne Modafferi: $62,000 (includes $31,000 win bonus) def. Maycee Barber: $29,000
- Sodiq Yusuff: $54,000 (includes $27,000 win bonus) def. Andre Fili: $55,000
- Askar Askarov: $20,000 (includes $10,000 win bonus) def. Tim Elliott: $31,000
- Drew Dober: $110,000 (includes $55,000 win bonus) def. Nasrat Haqparast: $25,000
- Aleksa Camur: $20,000 (includes $10,000 win bonus) def. Justin Ledet: $20,000
- Sabina Mazo: $24,000 (includes $12,000 win bonus) def. JJ Aldrich: $30,000

== See also ==
- List of UFC events
- List of current UFC fighters
- 2020 in UFC
