= UFC 271 =

Mixed martial arts event in 2022

UFC 271: Adesanya vs. Whittaker 2
- The poster for UFC 271: Adesanya vs. Whittaker 2
- Promotion: Ultimate Fighting Championship
- Date: February 12, 2022
- Venue: Toyota Center
- City: Houston, Texas, United States
- Attendance: 17,872
- Total gate: $4,300,000

Event chronology
| UFC Fight Night: Hermansson vs. Strickland | UFC 271: Adesanya vs. Whittaker 2 | UFC Fight Night: Walker vs. Hill |

UFC 271: Adesanya vs. Whittaker 2 was a mixed martial arts event produced by the Ultimate Fighting Championship that took place on February 12, 2022 at the Toyota Center in Houston, Texas, United States.

== Background ==
A UFC Middleweight Championship rematch between then champion Israel Adesanya and former champion Robert Whittaker (also The Ultimate Fighter: The Smashes welterweight winner) served as the event's headliner. The pairing met previously in October 2019 at UFC 243, when then interim champion Adesanya knocked out Whittaker in the second round to unify the middleweight title.

A flyweight bout between former UFC Flyweight Championship challenger Alex Perez and Matt Schnell was expected to take place at this event. They were previously scheduled to meet on four occasions (UFC 262, UFC on ESPN: Barboza vs. Chikadze, UFC Fight Night: Brunson vs. Till and UFC 269), but the contest was cancelled each time due to different reasons. At the weigh-ins, Perez came in at 128 pounds and did not attempt to try again, resulting in Matt Schnell refusing to take the catchweight bout and the bout being scrapped.

A potential middleweight title eliminator bout between Jared Cannonier and Derek Brunson was scheduled for UFC 270. However, the pairing was moved to this event due to undisclosed reasons.

2016 Olympic silver medalist in wrestling Mark Madsen and Vinc Pichel were expected to meet in a lightweight bout. However, they were pushed back to UFC 273 for unknown reasons.

A welterweight between Orion Cosce and Mike Mathetha was scheduled for the event. However, Cosce was pulled from the bout due to undisclosed reasons and replaced by Jeremiah Wells.

A light heavyweight bout between Maxim Grishin and Ed Herman was scheduled for this event. However in late January, Herman withdrew for unknown reasons and was replaced by William Knight. At the weigh-ins, Knight weighed in at 218 pounds, 12 pounds over the light heavyweight non-title fight limit, marking the biggest weight miss in UFC history. As a result, the bout was shifted to heavyweight and Knight was fined 40% of his purse, which went to Grishin.

== Results ==
Main card
| Weight class | | | | Method | Round | Time | Notes |
|---|---|---|---|---|---|---|---|
| Middleweight | Israel Adesanya (c) | def. | Robert Whittaker | Decision (unanimous) (48–47, 48–47, 49–46) | 5 | 5:00 | (Note: For the UFC Middleweight Championship.) |
| Heavyweight | Tai Tuivasa | def. | Derrick Lewis | KO (elbow) | 2 | 1:40 |
| Middleweight | Jared Cannonier | def. | Derek Brunson | KO (elbows) | 2 | 4:29 |
| Lightweight | Renato Moicano | def. | Alexander Hernandez | Submission (rear-naked choke) | 2 | 1:23 |
| Lightweight | Bobby Green | def. | Nasrat Haqparast | Decision (unanimous) (30–27, 30–27, 30–27) | 3 | 5:00 |
Preliminary card (ESPN / ESPN+)
| Heavyweight | Andrei Arlovski | def. | Jared Vanderaa | Decision (split) (29–28, 28–29, 29–28) | 3 | 5:00 |
| Women's Flyweight | Casey O'Neill | def. | Roxanne Modafferi | Decision (split) (29–28, 28–29, 29–28) | 3 | 5:00 |
| Bantamweight | Kyler Phillips | def. | Marcelo Rojo | Submission (triangle armbar) | 3 | 1:48 |
| Light Heavyweight | Carlos Ulberg | def. | Fabio Cherant | Decision (unanimous) (30–27, 30–27, 30–27) | 3 | 5:00 |
Early preliminary card (ESPN+ / UFC Fight Pass)
| Bantamweight | Ronnie Lawrence | def. | Leomana Martinez | Decision (unanimous) (29–27, 29–27, 29–28) | 3 | 5:00 |
| Middleweight | Jacob Malkoun | def. | A.J. Dobson | Decision (unanimous) (29–28, 29–28, 29–28) | 3 | 5:00 |
| Bantamweight | Douglas Silva de Andrade | def. | Sergey Morozov | Technical Submission (rear-naked choke) | 2 | 3:24 |
| Welterweight | Jeremiah Wells | def. | Mike Mathetha | Technical Submission (rear-naked choke) | 1 | 4:38 |
| Heavyweight | Maxim Grishin | def. | William Knight | Decision (unanimous) (30–27, 30–27, 30–27) | 3 | 5:00 |

== Bonus awards ==
The following fighters received $50,000 bonuses.

- Fight of the Night: Douglas Silva de Andrade vs. Sergey Morozov
- Performance of the Night: Tai Tuivasa and Jared Cannonier

== See also ==
- List of UFC events
- List of current UFC fighters
- 2022 in UFC
