= UFC Fight Night: Rockhold vs. Branch =

UFC mixed martial arts event in 2017

- The poster for UFC Fight Night: Rockhold vs. Branch
- Promotion: Ultimate Fighting Championship
- Date: September 16, 2017
- Venue: PPG Paints Arena
- City: Pittsburgh, Pennsylvania
- Attendance: 7,005
- Total gate: $396,190.75

Event chronology
UFC 215: Nunes vs. Shevchenko 2	UFC Fight Night: Rockhold vs. Branch	UFC Fight Night: Saint Preux vs. Okami

UFC Fight Night: Rockhold vs. Branch (also known as UFC Fight Night 116) was a mixed martial arts event produced by the Ultimate Fighting Championship held on September 16, 2017 at the PPG Paints Arena in Pittsburgh, Pennsylvania.

== Background ==
This event was the third that the UFC has hosted in Pittsburgh, Pennsylvania.

A middleweight bout between former Strikeforce and UFC Middleweight Champion Luke Rockhold and former WSOF Middleweight and Light Heavyweight Champion David Branch headlined this event.

A heavyweight bout between Justin Ledet and Dmitriy Sosnovskiy was expected to take place at UFC Fight Night: Bermudez vs. The Korean Zombie. However, Ledet pulled out of the fight on January 26 alleging an undisclosed injury, and promotion officials elected to remove Sosnovskiy from the card. In turn, the UFC confirmed that Ledet was suspended for four months after testing positive for a banned substance. The fight was expected to take place at this event. Subsequently, Sosnovskiy was removed from the card on September 10 and was replaced by promotional newcomer Zu Anyanwu.

An August 19 event (originally expected to be UFC 215) had two announced bouts, including a welterweight bout between Mike Perry and former UFC Welterweight Championship challenger Thiago Alves, as well as a middleweight bout between former Bellator Middleweight Champion Héctor Lombard and Anthony Smith. After the event was canceled, both fights took place at this event. In turn, Alves pulled out of the fight on September 13. He was replaced by promotional newcomer Alex Reyes.

A middleweight bout between Krzysztof Jotko and Uriah Hall was expected to take place at UFC Fight Night: Jędrzejczyk vs. Penne in June 2015. However, Hall was removed due to visa issues, and promotion officials elected to remove Jotko from the card as well. The fight took place at this event.

A bantamweight bout between Felipe Arantes and Luke Sanders was pulled from the card after Arantes fell sick on September 14 from an undisclosed illness.

== Results ==
Main Card (Fox Sports 1)
Weight class				Method	Round	Time	Notes
Middleweight	Luke Rockhold	def.	David Branch	TKO (submission to punches)	2	4:05
Welterweight	Mike Perry	def.	Alex Reyes	KO (knee)	1	1:19
Middleweight	Anthony Smith	def.	Héctor Lombard	TKO (punches)	3	2:33
Lightweight	Gregor Gillespie	def.	Jason Gonzalez	Submission (arm-triangle choke)	2	2:11
Welterweight	Kamaru Usman	def.	Sérgio Moraes	KO (punch)	1	2:48
Heavyweight	Justin Ledet	def.	Zu Anyanwu	Decision (split) (28–29, 29–28, 29–28)	3	5:00
Preliminary Card (Fox Sports 1)
Lightweight	Olivier Aubin-Mercier	def.	Anthony Rocco Martin	Decision (split) (28–29, 29–28, 29–28)	3	5:00
Heavyweight	Daniel Spitz	def.	Anthony Hamilton	TKO (punches)	1	0:24
Middleweight	Uriah Hall	def.	Krzysztof Jotko	KO (punches)	2	2:25
Lightweight	Gilbert Burns	def.	Jason Saggo	KO (punch)	2	4:55

== Bonus awards ==
The following fighters were awarded $50,000 bonuses:

- Fight of the Night: Gregor Gillespie vs Jason Gonzalez
- Performance of the Night: Mike Perry and Uriah Hall

== See also ==
- List of UFC events
- 2017 in UFC
