= Aleksandar Rakić =

Austrian mixed martial artist

- Born: 6 February 1992 (age 34); Vienna, Austria
- Native name: Александар Ракић
- Other names: Rocket
- Nationality: Serbian
- Height: 6 ft 4 in (1.93 m)
- Weight: 238 lb (108 kg; 17 st 0 lb)
- Division: Light Heavyweight (2011—2025); Heavyweight (2026—present)
- Reach: 78 in (198 cm)
- Fighting out of: Vienna, Austria
- Team: Gym 23; American Top Team
- Rank: Brown belt in Brazilian Jiu-Jitsu under Roberto Pastuch
- Years active: 2005–2011 (kickboxing); 2011–present (MMA)

Mixed martial arts record
- Total: 21
- Wins: 15
- By knockout: 9
- By submission: 1
- By decision: 5
- Losses: 6
- By knockout: 3
- By submission: 1
- By decision: 2

Other information
- Mixed martial arts record from Sherdog

Aleksandar Rakić (Serbian Cyrillic: Александар Ракић; born 6 February 1992) is a Serbian mixed martial artist. He currently competes in the Heavyweight division of the Ultimate Fighting Championship (UFC). A professional since 2011, Rakić has also competed for the Final Fight Championship in Austria.

== Background ==
Rakić was born and raised in Vienna, Austria, into a Serb family. As a child, he played football. However, he was aggressive up to a point where he was expelled from the team. Rakić started training in kickboxing and boxing when he was 12 years old, and had his first fight at 14. He accumulated over 40 fights by the time he was 20 years old, when he transitioned to mixed martial arts (MMA) for a new challenge. He worked at a hotel to support himself while training.

== Mixed martial arts career ==
=== Early career ===
Rakić started his professional MMA career in 2011, competing primarily in the European circuit, and amassed a record of 8–1 before being signed by the UFC in March 2017.

=== Ultimate Fighting Championship ===
Rakić made his UFC debut on 2 September 2017, against Francimar Barroso at UFC Fight Night 115 in Rotterdam, Netherlands. He won the fight via unanimous decision.

Rakić was expected to face Gadzhimurad Antigulov on 24 February 2018, at UFC on Fox 28. However, it was reported on 7 February 2018, that Antigulov was pulled from the fight, citing injury, as a result, the bout was cancelled.

His next fight came on 22 July 2018, at UFC Fight Night 134 against Justin Ledet. He won the fight via unanimous decision.

Rakić faced Devin Clark on 8 December 2018, at UFC 231. He won the fight by TKO in the first round.

Rakić next faced Jimi Manuwa on 1 June 2019, at UFC Fight Night 153. He won the fight by knockout with a head kick in the opening minute of the fight. The win also earned his first Performance of the Night bonus award.

Rakić faced Volkan Oezdemir on 21 December 2019, at UFC Fight Night 165 He lost the fight via split decision. 7 out of 8 media members scored the fight for Rakić.

On 17 February 2020, Rakić announced on his social media that he had signed a new, six-fight contract with the UFC.

Rakić faced Anthony Smith on 29 August 2020, at UFC Fight Night 175. He won the fight via unanimous decision.

Rakić faced Thiago Santos on 6 March 2021, at UFC 259. He won the fight via unanimous decision.

Rakić was scheduled to face former UFC Light Heavyweight champion Jan Błachowicz on 26 March 2022, at UFC on ESPN 33. However, in late January, Błachowicz withdrew due to an injury and the bout was rescheduled for UFC on ESPN 36 on 14 May 2022. Rakić lost the fight via technical knockout in round three after being rendered unable to continue after tearing his anterior cruciate ligament. He hurt his knee three weeks prior to the fight during sparring.

After a nearly two-year layoff, Rakić was set to make his return to face Jan Błachowicz in a rematch on 20 January 2024, at UFC 297. However, Błachowicz withdrew due to shoulder surgery. Rakić was then booked to instead face former UFC Light Heavyweight champion Jiří Procházka on 13 April 2024 at UFC 300. Despite landing numerous leg kicks, Rakić lost the bout by technical knockout in the second round.

Rakić faced Magomed Ankalaev on 26 October 2024 at UFC 308. He lost the fight via unanimous decision.

Rakić faced undefeated prospect Azamat Murzakanov on 25 October 2025 at UFC 321. He lost the fight by technical knockout in the first round.

Moving up to heavyweight, Rakić faced Marcin Tybura on 1 August 2026 at UFC Fight Night 283. He won the fight by unanimous decision.

== Championships and accomplishments ==
- Ultimate Fighting Championship
  - Performance of the Night (One time) vs. Jimi Manuwa
  - UFC Honors Awards
    - 2019: Fan's Choice Knockout of the Year Nominee vs. Jimi Manuwa
  - UFC.com Awards
    - 2019: Ranked #3 Knockout of the Year vs. Jimi Manuwa

== Mixed martial arts record ==
Professional record breakdown
21 matches	15 wins	6 losses
By knockout	9	3
By submission	1	1
By decision	5	2

Res.	Record	Opponent	Method	Event	Date	Round	Time	Location	Notes
Win	15–6	Marcin Tybura	Decision (unanimous)	UFC Fight Night: Medić vs. Rodriguez	1 August 2026	3	5:00	Belgrade, Serbia	Heavyweight debut.
Loss	14–6	Azamat Murzakanov	TKO (punches)	UFC 321	25 October 2025	1	3:11	Abu Dhabi, United Arab Emirates	
Loss	14–5	Magomed Ankalaev	Decision (unanimous)	UFC 308	26 October 2024	3	5:00	Abu Dhabi, United Arab Emirates	
Loss	14–4	Jiří Procházka	TKO (punches)	UFC 300	13 April 2024	2	3:17	Las Vegas, Nevada, United States	
Loss	14–3	Jan Błachowicz	TKO (knee injury)	UFC on ESPN: Błachowicz vs. Rakić	14 May 2022	3	1:11	Las Vegas, Nevada, United States	
Win	14–2	Thiago Santos	Decision (unanimous)	UFC 259	6 March 2021	3	5:00	Las Vegas, Nevada, United States	
Win	13–2	Anthony Smith	Decision (unanimous)	UFC Fight Night: Smith vs. Rakić	29 August 2020	3	5:00	Las Vegas, Nevada, United States	
Loss	12–2	Volkan Oezdemir	Decision (split)	UFC Fight Night: Edgar vs. The Korean Zombie	21 December 2019	3	5:00	Busan, South Korea	
Win	12–1	Jimi Manuwa	KO (head kick)	UFC Fight Night: Gustafsson vs. Smith	1 June 2019	1	0:42	Stockholm, Sweden	Performance of the Night.
Win	11–1	Devin Clark	TKO (punches)	UFC 231	8 December 2018	1	4:05	Toronto, Ontario, Canada	
Win	10–1	Justin Ledet	Decision (unanimous)	UFC Fight Night: Shogun vs. Smith	22 July 2018	3	5:00	Hamburg, Germany	
Win	9–1	Francimar Barroso	Decision (unanimous)	UFC Fight Night: Volkov vs. Struve	2 September 2017	3	5:00	Rotterdam, Netherlands	
Win	8–1	Sergio Souza	TKO (punches)	Austrian Fight Challenge 5	4 March 2017	1	N/A	Vienna, Austria	
Win	7–1	Martin Batur	KO (punch)	Austrian Fight Challenge 1	20 June 2015	1	0:26	Vienna, Austria	
Win	6–1	Marcin Prachnio	TKO (punches)	Final Fight Championship 16	6 December 2014	3	3:00	Vienna, Austria	
Win	5–1	Norbert Péter	TKO (punches)	Heimgala 2	13 September 2014	1	4:57	Vienna, Austria	
Win	4–1	Péter Rozmaring	Submission (north-south choke)	Vendetta: Rookies 2	6 July 2013	1	1:32	Vienna, Austria	
Win	3–1	Laszlo Czene	KO (head kick)	World Freefight Challenge: Challengers 3	3 June 2012	1	N/A	Vienna, Austria	
Win	2–1	Richard Longhimo	TKO (punches)	Vendetta Fight Nights 3	18 March 2012	2	4:30	Vienna, Austria	
Win	1–1	Carsten Lorenz	TKO (punches)	Free Fight Association: New Talents 15	4 February 2012	1	1:42	Erfurt, Germany	
Loss	0–1	Christian Radke	Submission (guillotine choke)	Rock the Cage 2	15 October 2011	1	4:34	Greifswald, Germany	Light Heavyweight debut.

== See also ==
- List of current UFC fighters
- List of male mixed martial artists
