= Anthony Smith (fighter) =

American mixed martial arts fighter

- Born: Anthony J. Smith; July 26, 1988 (age 38); Corpus Christi, Texas, U.S.
- Other names: Lionheart
- Height: 6 ft 4 in (193 cm)
- Weight: 205 lb (93 kg; 14 st 9 lb)
- Division: Middleweight (2008–2018); Light Heavyweight (2018–2025); Heavyweight (2026–present)
- Reach: 76 in (193 cm)
- Fighting out of: Omaha, Nebraska, U.S.
- Team: Mick Doyle's Kickboxing Academy; Factory X (2017–present)
- Trainer: Marc Montoya
- Rank: Black belt in Brazilian Jiu-Jitsu
- Years active: 2008–present

Mixed martial arts record
- Total: 62
- Wins: 39
- By knockout: 20
- By submission: 16
- By decision: 3
- Losses: 23
- By knockout: 14
- By submission: 4
- By decision: 5

Other information
- Mixed martial arts record from Sherdog

Anthony J. Smith (born July 26, 1988) is an American professional mixed martial artist who competed in the Light Heavyweight division of the Ultimate Fighting Championship (UFC), where he was a challenger for the UFC Light Heavyweight Championship in March 2019. A professional since 2008, Smith has also competed for Strikeforce and Bellator.

== Background ==
Born in Corpus Christi, Texas, Smith grew up in Nebraska City. He was raised by his single mother and grandfather, as his dad was absent. He has stated that he is biracial (half-black and half-white). Smith dropped out of high school in the middle of his senior year. He started working full-time as a concrete finisher, which he continued until 2016.

== Mixed martial arts career ==
=== Amateur career ===
Smith started fighting as an amateur in 2006 and quickly compiled a record of 35 amateur fights, winning every local promotion’s belt in Nebraska.

=== Early career ===
Smith started his career in 2008 and fought mainly for local promotions in the midwestern United States. He compiled a professional record of 13–7, with wins against WEC veterans Logan Clark, Eric Schambari and losses to UFC veterans Jake Hecht and Jesse Forbes, before signing with Strikeforce.

=== Strikeforce ===
Smith made his Strikeforce debut on July 22, 2011, at Strikeforce Challengers: Bowling vs. Voelker III against Ben Lagman, replacing an injured Louis Taylor. He won via KO in the second round.

Smith faced Adlan Amagov on November 18, 2011, at Strikeforce Challengers: Britt vs. Sayers. He lost via KO in the first round.

Smith faced Lumumba Sayers on August 18, 2012, at Strikeforce: Rousey vs. Kaufman. He won via submission in the first round.

Smith faced Roger Gracie on January 12, 2013, at Strikeforce: Marquardt vs. Saffiedine. He lost via submission in the second round.

After the end of Strikeforce, Smith moved to the UFC.

=== Ultimate Fighting Championship ===
In his debut, Smith faced Antônio Braga Neto on June 8, 2013, at UFC on Fuel TV 10. He lost the fight via kneebar submission in the first round. He was subsequently released from the UFC.

=== Bellator MMA ===
On April 18, 2014, Smith made his Bellator MMA debut facing Victor Moreno at Bellator 117 winning via triangle choke submission in the second round.

Smith faced Brian Green on October 17, 2014, at Bellator 129. He won the fight via unanimous decision.

=== Return to Ultimate Fighting Championship ===
On February 16, 2016, Smith was re-signed to the UFC. He faced promotional newcomer Leonardo Augusto Leleco on February 21, 2016, at UFC Fight Night 83, replacing an injured Trevor Smith. He won the fight via unanimous decision.

Smith was briefly scheduled to face Scott Askham on July 8, 2016, at The Ultimate Fighter 23 Finale. However, Askham pulled out of the bout on April 28 and was replaced by Cezar Ferreira. He lost the fight via unanimous decision.

Smith next faced Elvis Mutapčić on December 3, 2016, at The Ultimate Fighter 24 Finale. He won the fight via TKO in the second round and was awarded a Performance of the Night bonus.

Smith faced Andrew Sanchez on April 15, 2017, at UFC on Fox 24. He won the fight via knockout due to a combination of knee and punches in the third round.

Smith faced Héctor Lombard on September 16, 2017, at UFC Fight Night 116. He won the fight via technical knockout in the third round.

Smith faced Thiago Santos on February 3, 2018, at UFC Fight Night 125. He lost the fight via technical knockout. Both participants received a Fight of the Night bonus.

==== Move to Light Heavyweight ====
Smith faced former champion Rashad Evans in his light heavyweight debut on June 9, 2018, at UFC 225. He won the fight via knockout in the first round.

On short notice, Smith replaced Volkan Oezdemir, and faced yet another former champion in Maurício Rua on July 22, 2018, at UFC Fight Night 134 main event. He won the fight via knockout in the first round. This win earned him the Performance of the Night award.

In his third fight in five months, Smith faced Volkan Oezdemir on October 27, 2018, at UFC Fight Night 138. He won the fight by submission in the third round. This win earned him the second consecutive Performance of the Night award.

In the highest profile fight of his career, Smith faced Jon Jones for the UFC Light Heavyweight Championship on March 2, 2019, at UFC 235. He lost the fight via unanimous decision.

Smith faced Alexander Gustafsson on June 1, 2019, in the main event at UFC Fight Night 153. He won the fight via rear-naked choke submission in the fourth round. The win also earned Smith a Performance of the Night bonus award.

Smith was scheduled to face Glover Teixeira on April 25, 2020, at UFC Fight Night 173. However, on April 9, Dana White, the president of UFC announced that this event was postponed and rescheduled to May 13, 2020, at UFC Fight Night: Smith vs. Teixeira. Smith lost the fight via technical knockout in the fifth round.

Smith faced Aleksandar Rakić on August 29, 2020, at UFC Fight Night 175. He lost the fight via unanimous decision.

Smith faced Devin Clark on November 28, 2020, at UFC on ESPN: Smith vs. Clark. He won the fight via a triangle choke submission in the first round.

Smith faced Jimmy Crute on April 24, 2021, at UFC 261. He won the fight by technical knockout before the second round after the doctor stopped the fight when Crute suffered foot drop as a result of a leg kick from Smith and was unable to continue.

Smith faced Ryan Spann on September 18, 2021, at UFC Fight Night 192. He won the fight via rear-naked choke submission in round one. This win earned him the Performance of the Night award.

Smith faced Magomed Ankalaev on July 30, 2022, at UFC 277. He lost the fight via technical knockout in the second round.

Smith was scheduled to face Jamahal Hill on March 11, 2023, at UFC Fight Night 221. However, Hill was pulled from the bout after being rebooked to instead face Glover Teixeira for the vacant light heavyweight title at UFC 283. Smith served as the backup for that fight, but missed weight by 1.5lbs.

Smith faced Johnny Walker on May 13, 2023, at UFC on ABC 4. He lost the bout via unanimous decision.

Smith faced Ryan Spann in a rematch on August 26, 2023, at UFC Fight Night 225. He won the close bout via split decision. 9 out of 14 media outlets scored the bout for Spann.

Smith faced Khalil Rountree Jr. on December 9, 2023, at UFC Fight Night 233, as a replacement for Azamat Murzakanov who fell ill with Pneumonia. He lost the fight via technical knockout in round three.

Smith faced Vitor Petrino on May 4, 2024, at UFC 301. He won the fight in the first round via a guillotine-choke submission.

Smith was scheduled to step in on short notice to face Carlos Ulberg on June 29, 2024, at UFC 303, as a replacement for an injured Jamahal Hill. However, one week before the event, Ulberg was forced to withdraw and was replaced by Roman Dolidze. Smith lost the fight by unanimous decision.

Weeks prior to his bout at UFC 310 in November 2024, Smith's longtime coach of over fifteen years Scott Morton died suddenly. Smith faced former UFC Light Heavyweight Championship title challenger Dominick Reyes on December 7, 2024 at UFC 310. He lost the fight by technical knockout via elbows and punches in the second round.

Smith had his retirement fight against Zhang Mingyang on April 26, 2025 at UFC on ESPN 66. Smith lost the bout by TKO in the first round after the top of his head was cut open by a lead elbow.

=== Post UFC ===
Smith faced Chase Sherman in a bare knuckle MMA fight on April 10, 2026, in the main event of Gamebred Bareknuckle MMA 9 in the Dominican Republic. He won the bout via a rear-naked choke submission in the first round.

== Professional grappling career ==
Smith competed against Glover Teixeira in the main event of UFC Fight Pass Invitational 4 on June 29, 2023. He lost the match by decision.

== Championships and accomplishments ==
- Ultimate Fighting Championship
  - Performance of the Night (Six times) vs. Elvis Mutapčić, Maurício Rua, Volkan Oezdemir, Alexander Gustafsson, Devin Clark and Ryan Spann
  - Fight of the Night (One time) vs. Thiago Santos
  - Tied (Mauricio Rua, Paul Craig & Nikita Krylov) for fifth most finishes in UFC Light Heavyweight division history (8)
  - UFC.com Awards
    - 2018: Ranked #6 Fighter of the Year
- Cage Fury Fighting Championships
  - CFFC Middleweight Championship (One time)
- Victory Fighting Championships
  - Victory FC Middleweight Championship (One time)

== Personal life ==
=== Home invasion incident ===
At approximately 4:00 a.m. on April 5, 2020, an intruder gained entry to Smith's home in Nebraska through an opened garage door. Smith found him "screaming at the top of his lungs" in his computer room, and proceeded to fight the man for five minutes until the police arrived. Smith states that the intruder "took everything that I gave him – every punch, every knee, every elbow. He took every single one of them and kept fighting me", describing the ordeal "as one of the toughest fights" of his life. The man was later identified to be 21-year-old Luke Haberman, an accomplished former high school wrestler.

=== Domestic violence arrest ===
On the night of July 27, 2026, Smith was arrested in Sarpy County, Nebraska and booked on felony charges of attempted first degree domestic assault, terroristic threats, and false imprisonment. Smith is accused of threatening to kill his wife if she did not ride home with him after a night out at a local bar, forcefully making her enter his vehicle by pushing her inside, and pushing her around as they rode home. Smith is also accused of attempting to run his wife over as she attempted to escape the scene, but she was able to avoid contact with the vehicle. He was released from custody on July 29 after posting a $500,000 bond. Per the terms of his bond, Smith is prohibited from having contact with his wife, and has also been barred from leaving the state of Nebraska.

== Mixed martial arts record ==
Professional record breakdown
62 matches	39 wins	23 losses
By knockout	20	14
By submission	16	4
By decision	3	5

Res.	Record	Opponent	Method	Event	Date	Round	Time	Location	Notes
Loss	39–23	Jordan Heiderman	TKO (punches)	Gamebred Bareknuckle MMA 12	October 2, 2026	2	2:17	Santo Domingo, Dominican Republic	Gamebred FC Heavyweight Grand Prix Quarterfinal.
Win	39–22	Chase Sherman	Submission (rear-naked choke)	Gamebred Bareknuckle MMA 9	April 10, 2026	1	3:27	Santo Domingo, Dominican Republic	Heavyweight debut. Gamebred FC Heavyweight Grand Prix Round of 16.
Loss	38–22	Zhang Mingyang	TKO (elbows)	UFC on ESPN: Machado Garry vs. Prates	April 26, 2025	1	4:03	Kansas City, Missouri, United States	
Loss	38–21	Dominick Reyes	TKO (elbows and punches)	UFC 310	December 7, 2024	2	4:46	Las Vegas, Nevada, United States	
Loss	38–20	Roman Dolidze	Decision (unanimous)	UFC 303	June 29, 2024	3	5:00	Las Vegas, Nevada, United States	
Win	38–19	Vitor Petrino	Submission (guillotine choke)	UFC 301	May 4, 2024	1	2:00	Rio de Janeiro, Brazil	
Loss	37–19	Khalil Rountree Jr.	TKO (punches)	UFC Fight Night: Song vs. Gutiérrez	December 9, 2023	3	0:56	Las Vegas, Nevada, United States	
Win	37–18	Ryan Spann	Decision (split)	UFC Fight Night: Holloway vs. The Korean Zombie	August 26, 2023	3	5:00	Kallang, Singapore	
Loss	36–18	Johnny Walker	Decision (unanimous)	UFC on ABC: Rozenstruik vs. Almeida	May 13, 2023	3	5:00	Charlotte, North Carolina, United States	
Loss	36–17	Magomed Ankalaev	TKO (punches)	UFC 277	July 30, 2022	2	3:09	Dallas, Texas, United States	
Win	36–16	Ryan Spann	Submission (rear-naked choke)	UFC Fight Night: Smith vs. Spann	September 18, 2021	1	3:47	Las Vegas, Nevada, United States	Performance of the Night.
Win	35–16	Jimmy Crute	TKO (doctor stoppage)	UFC 261	April 24, 2021	1	5:00	Jacksonville, Florida, United States	
Win	34–16	Devin Clark	Submission (triangle choke)	UFC on ESPN: Smith vs. Clark	November 28, 2020	1	2:34	Las Vegas, Nevada, United States	Performance of the Night.
Loss	33–16	Aleksandar Rakić	Decision (unanimous)	UFC Fight Night: Smith vs. Rakić	August 29, 2020	3	5:00	Las Vegas, Nevada, United States	
Loss	33–15	Glover Teixeira	TKO (punches)	UFC Fight Night: Smith vs. Teixeira	May 13, 2020	5	1:04	Jacksonville, Florida, United States	
Win	33–14	Alexander Gustafsson	Submission (rear-naked choke)	UFC Fight Night: Gustafsson vs. Smith	June 1, 2019	4	2:38	Stockholm, Sweden	Performance of the Night.
Loss	32–14	Jon Jones	Decision (unanimous)	UFC 235	March 2, 2019	5	5:00	Las Vegas, Nevada, United States	For the UFC Light Heavyweight Championship. Jones was deducted two points in round 4 after landing an illegal knee.
Win	32–13	Volkan Oezdemir	Submission (rear-naked choke)	UFC Fight Night: Volkan vs. Smith	October 27, 2018	3	4:26	Moncton, New Brunswick, Canada	Performance of the Night.
Win	31–13	Maurício Rua	KO (elbow and punches)	UFC Fight Night: Shogun vs. Smith	July 22, 2018	1	1:29	Hamburg, Germany	Performance of the Night.
Win	30–13	Rashad Evans	KO (knee)	UFC 225	June 9, 2018	1	0:53	Chicago, Illinois, United States	Light Heavyweight debut.
Loss	29–13	Thiago Santos	TKO (body kick and punches)	UFC Fight Night: Machida vs. Anders	February 3, 2018	2	1:03	Belém, Brazil	Fight of the Night.
Win	29–12	Héctor Lombard	KO (punch)	UFC Fight Night: Rockhold vs. Branch	September 16, 2017	3	2:33	Pittsburgh, Pennsylvania, United States	
Win	28–12	Andrew Sanchez	KO (head kick and punches)	UFC on Fox: Johnson vs. Reis	April 9, 2017	3	3:52	Kansas City, Missouri, United States	
Win	27–12	Elvis Mutapčić	TKO (elbow and punches)	The Ultimate Fighter: Tournament of Champions Finale	December 3, 2016	2	3:27	Las Vegas, Nevada, United States	Performance of the Night.
Loss	26–12	Cezar Ferreira	Decision (unanimous)	The Ultimate Fighter: Team Joanna vs. Team Cláudia Finale	July 8, 2016	3	5:00	Las Vegas, Nevada, United States	
Win	26–11	Leonardo Augusto Guimarães	Decision (unanimous)	UFC Fight Night: Cowboy vs. Cowboy	February 21, 2016	3	5:00	Pittsburgh, Pennsylvania, United States	
Win	25–11	Josh Neer	TKO (punches)	Victory FC 47	January 14, 2016	1	3:27	Omaha, Nebraska, United States	Won the Victory FC Middleweight Championship.
Win	24–11	Brock Jardine	TKO (punches)	RFA 30	September 18, 2015	1	3:00	Lincoln, Nebraska, United States	
Win	23–11	Tim Williams	TKO (knee)	Cage Fury FC 50	July 18, 2015	1	1:02	Atlantic City, New Jersey, United States	Defended the Cage Fury FC Middleweight Championship.
Win	22–11	Tim Williams	Submission (inverted triangle choke)	Cage Fury FC 46	February 28, 2015	2	1:15	Chester, Pennsylvania, United States	Won the Cage Fury FC Middleweight Championship.
Win	21–11	Andrew Kapel	Submission (rear-naked choke)	Extreme Beatdown: Beatdown at 4 Bears 12	November 29, 2014	1	2:18	New Town, North Dakota, United States	
Win	20–11	Brian Green	Decision (unanimous)	Bellator 129	October 17, 2014	3	5:00	Council Bluffs, Iowa, United States	
Win	19–11	Victor Moreno	Submission (triangle choke)	Bellator 117	April 18, 2014	2	0:59	Council Bluffs, Iowa, United States	
Loss	18–11	Josh Neer	Submission (rear-naked choke)	Victory FC 41	December 14, 2013	3	3:48	Ralston, Nebraska, United States	
Loss	18–10	Antônio Braga Neto	Submission (kneebar)	UFC on Fuel TV: Nogueira vs. Werdum	June 8, 2013	1	1:52	Fortaleza, Brazil	
Loss	18–9	Roger Gracie	Submission (arm-triangle choke)	Strikeforce: Marquardt vs. Saffiedine	January 12, 2013	2	3:16	Oklahoma City, Oklahoma, United States	
Win	18–8	Lumumba Sayers	Submission (triangle choke)	Strikeforce: Rousey vs. Kaufman	August 18, 2012	1	3:52	San Diego, California, United States	
Win	17–8	Richard White	TKO (punches)	Disorderly Conduct: Fireworks	June 30, 2012	1	2:35	Nebraska City, Nebraska, United States	
Win	16–8	Ian Berg	Submission (arm-triangle choke)	Victory FC 37	April 13, 2012	2	2:01	Council Bluffs, Iowa, United States	
Loss	15–8	Adlan Amagov	KO (punches)	Strikeforce Challengers: Britt vs. Sayers	November 18, 2011	1	2:32	Las Vegas, Nevada, United States	Catchweight (188 lb) bout; Smith missed weight.
Win	15–7	Ben Lagman	KO (punch)	Strikeforce Challengers: Voelker vs. Bowling III	July 22, 2011	2	0:33	Las Vegas, Nevada, United States	
Win	14–7	Curtis Johnson	KO (punches)	Cornhusker Fight Club 6	July 9, 2011	1	3:13	Lincoln, Nebraska, United States	
Win	13–7	Eric Schambari	TKO (punches)	C3 Fights 28	June 4, 2011	1	1:46	Concho, Oklahoma, United States	
Win	12–7	Matt Gabel	Submission (triangle choke)	Extreme Challenge 181	April 15, 2011	1	1:50	Council Bluffs, Iowa, United States	
Win	11–7	Demetrius Richards	TKO (punches)	Extreme Challenge 176	February 11, 2011	2	2:07	Council Bluffs, Iowa, United States	
Win	10–7	Ben Crowder	KO (punch)	Cornhusker Fight Club 2	December 17, 2010	1	1:09	Lincoln, Nebraska, United States	
Loss	9–7	Jesse Forbes	TKO (punches)	Crowbar MMA: Fall Brawl	September 11, 2010	2	1:28	Fargo, North Dakota, United States	
Win	9–6	Logan Clark	TKO (doctor stoppage)	Seconds Out / Vivid MMA: Havoc at the Hyatt 2	June 19, 2010	2	2:22	Minneapolis, Minnesota, United States	
Win	8–6	Lucas St. Claire	Submission (armbar)	Max Fights 10	May 8, 2010	1	3:19	East Grand Forks, Minnesota, United States	
Win	7–6	Mike George	KO (punch)	TriState Cage Fights: Island Warfare	April 17, 2010	1	0:22	Grand Island, Nebraska, United States	
Win	6–6	James Brasco	TKO (doctor stoppage)	Xtreme Kombat League: Evolution 1	March 20, 2010	1	1:21	Ypsilanti, Michigan, United States	
Loss	5–6	Jake Hecht	TKO (punches)	Victory FC 30	February 5, 2010	3	4:35	Council Bluffs, Iowa, United States	
Loss	5–5	Mike Pitz	TKO (submission to punches)	Fight Club Inc. 1	July 25, 2009	2	3:21	Addison, Illinois, United States	
Loss	5–4	Chaun Sims	TKO (punches)	Fight To Win: Colorado vs. Nebraska	March 14, 2009	2	2:00	Denver, Colorado, United States	
Loss	5–3	Brian Monahan	Submission (armbar)	Victory FC 26	February 20, 2009	1	N/A	Council Bluffs, Iowa, United States	
Win	5–2	Rico Washington Sr.	TKO (submission to punches)	Minnesota Combat Sports 5	January 9, 2009	1	0:54	Maplewood, Minnesota, United States	
Loss	4–2	Charley Lynch	TKO (punches)	Brutaal Fight Night 19	November 6, 2008	1	3:12	Maplewood, Minnesota, United States	
Win	4–1	Chuck Parmelee	Submission (kimura)	Torment MMA 1	September 20, 2008	2	1:26	Lincoln, Nebraska, United States	
Loss	3–1	Chuck Parmelee	TKO (punches)	TriState Cage Fights 3	June 14, 2008	2	N/A	Yankton, South Dakota, United States	
Win	3–0	Ricky Duvall	KO (punch)	Victory FC 23	May 9, 2008	N/A	N/A	Council Bluffs, Iowa, United States	
Win	2–0	Jeremy Shepherd	Submission (choke)	Pugilistic Productions 1	March 22, 2008	2	2:13	Lincoln, Nebraska, United States	
Win	1–0	Dave Moran	Submission (armbar)	Victory FC 22: Ascension	February 29, 2008	2	1:19	Sioux City, Iowa, United States	Middleweight debut.

== Pay-per-view bouts ==
No.	Event	Fight	Date	Venue	City	PPV Buys
1.	UFC 235	Jones vs. Smith	March 2, 2019	T-Mobile Arena	Paradise, Nevada, United States	650,000

== See also ==
- List of Bellator MMA alumni
- List of Strikeforce alumni
- List of male mixed martial artists
