= UFC Fight Night: Gustafsson vs. Smith =

UFC mixed martial arts event in 2019

- The poster for UFC Fight Night: Gustafsson vs. Smith
- Promotion: Ultimate Fighting Championship
- Date: June 1, 2019
- Venue: Ericsson Globe
- City: Stockholm, Sweden
- Attendance: 14,319
- Total gate: $2,000,000

Event chronology
UFC Fight Night: dos Anjos vs. Lee	UFC Fight Night: Gustafsson vs. Smith	UFC 238: Cejudo vs. Moraes

UFC Fight Night: Gustafsson vs. Smith (also known as UFC Fight Night 153 or UFC on ESPN+ 11) was a mixed martial arts event produced by the Ultimate Fighting Championship that was held on June 1, 2019 at the Ericsson Globe in Stockholm, Sweden.

== Background ==
A light heavyweight bout between former UFC Light Heavyweight Championship challengers Alexander Gustafsson and Anthony Smith was the event's headliner.

Luigi Vendramini was scheduled to face Nick Hein at the event. However, Vendramini pulled out of the bout in late April citing a knee injury and subsequent surgery. Hein remained on the card against Frank Camacho.

A welterweight bout between Bartosz Fabiński and Sergey Khandozhko was scheduled at the event. However it was reported on May 24, 2019 that Fabinski pulled out of the bout due to injury and he was replaced by newcomer Rostem Akman.

A light heavyweight bout between former title challenger Volkan Oezdemir and Ilir Latifi was expected to take place as the co-main, but Latifi pulled out two days before the event due to a back injury and the bout was canceled.

== Results ==
Main Card (ESPN+)
Weight class				Method	Round	Time	Notes
Light Heavyweight	Anthony Smith	def.	Alexander Gustafsson	Submission (rear-naked choke)	4	2:38
Light Heavyweight	Aleksandar Rakić	def.	Jimi Manuwa	KO (head kick)	1	0:42
Featherweight	Makwan Amirkhani	def.	Chris Fishgold	Submission (anaconda choke)	2	4:25
Lightweight	Christos Giagos	def.	Damir Hadžović	Decision (unanimous) (29–27, 29–27, 29–28)	3	5:00
Featherweight	Daniel Teymur	def.	Sung Bin Jo	Decision (unanimous) (30–27, 30–27, 29–28)	3	5:00
Preliminary Card (ESPN2)
Welterweight	Sergey Khandozhko	def.	Rostem Akman	Decision (unanimous) (29–28, 29–28, 29–28)	3	5:00
Women's Bantamweight	Lina Länsberg	def.	Tonya Evinger	Decision (unanimous) (30–26, 30–27, 30–26)	3	5:00
Lightweight	Leonardo Santos	def.	Stevie Ray	KO (punch)	1	2:17
Lightweight	Frank Camacho	def.	Nick Hein	TKO (punches)	2	4:56
Women's Bantamweight	Bea Malecki	def.	Duda Santana	Submission (rear-naked choke)	2	1:59
Light Heavyweight	Devin Clark	def.	Darko Stošić	Decision (unanimous) (29–28, 29–28, 29–28)	3	5:00
Lightweight	Joel Álvarez	def.	Danilo Belluardo	TKO (elbows and punches)	2	2:22

== Bonus awards ==
The following fighters received $50,000 bonuses:

- Fight of the Night: No bonus awarded.
- Performance of the Night: Anthony Smith, Aleksandar Rakić, Makwan Amirkhani and Leonardo Santos

== See also ==
- List of UFC events
- 2019 in UFC
- List of current UFC fighters
