= Justin Ledet =

American mixed martial arts fighter

- Born: Justin Wayne Ledet; September 28, 1988 (age 38); Rosharon, Texas, United States
- Other names: El Blanco
- Height: 6 ft 4 in (1.93 m)
- Weight: 205 lb (93 kg; 14.6 st)
- Division: Heavyweight; Light Heavyweight
- Reach: 80 in (203 cm)
- Stance: Orthodox
- Fighting out of: Rosharon, Texas, United States
- Team: Gracie Barra Texas
- Rank: Blue belt in Brazilian Jiu-Jitsu
- Years active: 2010–present

Mixed martial arts record
- Total: 14
- Wins: 9
- By knockout: 2
- By submission: 5
- By decision: 2
- Losses: 4
- By knockout: 2
- By decision: 2
- No contests: 1

Other information
- Mixed martial arts record from Sherdog

Justin Wayne Ledet (born September 28, 1988) is an American professional mixed martial artist who competes in the Light Heavyweight division. A professional since 2010, he has most notably competed for the Ultimate Fighting Championship.

== Background ==
Born and raised in the Houston, Texas, area, Ledet was a talented basketball player, competing as a small forward for NCAA Division II Texas A&M University-Kingsville. Upon quitting basketball, Ledet began training in mixed martial arts to stay in shape and was introduced to the sport through his cousin.

== Mixed martial arts career ==
=== Early career ===
Before joining the UFC, Ledet amassed a record of 6-0-1 with all of his wins thus far coming by stoppages, fighting almost exclusively in his home state of Texas. He also held an amateur record of 3–0 before turning professional.

=== Ultimate Fighting Championship ===
Ledet made his promotional debut on August 6, 2016, at UFC Fight Night 92 against Chase Sherman. He won the fight via unanimous decision.

Ledet's next fight came on November 19, 2016, at UFC Fight Night 99 against Mark Godbeer. He won the fight via submission in the first round.

Ledet was expected to face promotional newcomer Dmitriy Sosnovskiy on February 4, 2017, at UFC Fight Night 104. However, Ledet pulled out of the fight on January 26 citing an undisclosed injury. In turn, promotional officials confirmed that Ledet was suspended for four months after testing positive for an anabolic agent in a contaminated supplement.

Ledet was expected to face Dmitriy Sosnovskiy on September 16, 2017, at UFC Fight Night 116. Subsequently, Sosnovskiy was removed from the card on September 10 and replaced by promotional newcomer Zu Anyanwu. He won the back-and-forth fight via split decision.

Ledet faced Aleksandar Rakić on July 22, 2018, at UFC Fight Night 134. He lost the fight via unanimous decision.

Ledet faced Johnny Walker on February 2, 2019, at UFC Fight Night 144. He lost the fight via TKO in the first round.

Ledet was expected to face promotional newcomer Dalcha Lungiambula on June 29, 2019, at UFC on ESPN 3. However, on June 24, it was announced that Ledet was removed from the card for undisclosed reason.

Ledet faced Aleksa Camur on January 18, 2020, at UFC 246. He lost the fight by unanimous decision.

Ledet faced Dustin Jacoby on October 31, 2020, at UFC Fight Night 181. He lost the fight via TKO in the first round.

On November 13, 2020, the UFC announced that they had released him.

== Championships and accomplishments ==
- Ultimate Fighting Championship
  - UFC.com Awards
    - 2016: Ranked #7 Newcomer of the Year

== Mixed martial arts record ==
Professional record breakdown
14 matches	9 wins	4 losses
By knockout	2	2
By submission	5	0
By decision	2	2
No contests	1	

Res.	Record	Opponent	Method	Event	Date	Round	Time	Location	Notes
Loss	9–4 (1)	Dustin Jacoby	TKO (leg kicks and punches)	UFC Fight Night: Hall vs. Silva	October 31, 2020	1	2:38	Las Vegas, Nevada, United States	
Loss	9–3 (1)	Aleksa Camur	Decision (unanimous)	UFC 246	January 18, 2020	3	5:00	Las Vegas, Nevada, United States	
Loss	9–2 (1)	Johnny Walker	TKO (spinning back fist and punches)	UFC Fight Night: Assunção vs. Moraes 2	February 2, 2019	1	0:15	Fortaleza, Brazil	
Loss	9–1 (1)	Aleksandar Rakić	Decision (unanimous)	UFC Fight Night: Shogun vs. Smith	July 22, 2018	3	5:00	Hamburg, Germany	Return to Light Heavyweight.
Win	9–0 (1)	Zu Anyanwu	Decision (split)	UFC Fight Night: Rockhold vs. Branch	September 16, 2017	3	5:00	Pittsburgh, Pennsylvania, United States	
Win	8–0 (1)	Mark Godbeer	Submission (rear-naked choke)	UFC Fight Night: Mousasi vs. Hall 2	November 19, 2016	1	2:16	Belfast, Northern Ireland	Performance of the Night.
Win	7–0 (1)	Chase Sherman	Decision (unanimous)	UFC Fight Night: Rodríguez vs. Caceres	August 6, 2016	3	5:00	Salt Lake City, Utah, United States	
NC	6–0 (1)	Brice Ritani-Coe	NC (accidental eye poke)	Legacy FC 55	May 13, 2016	1	1:37	Houston, Texas, United States	
Win	6–0	Jon Hill	Submission	RITC 44	February 27, 2016	1	1:47	Oklahoma City, Oklahoma, United States	Heavyweight debut.
Win	5–0	Jordan Clissold	TKO (punches)	IXFA 8	July 7, 2012	1	0:59	Vinton, Louisiana, United States	
Win	4–0	Ike Villanueva	Submission (armbar)	Immortal Kombat Fighting	January 28, 2012	3	0:40	Spring, Texas, United States	
Win	3–0	Alexander Pappas	Submission	IXFA: Extreme Fighting	April 23, 2011	1	0:26	Winnie, Texas, United States	
Win	2–0	Jason Sullivan	TKO (punches)	IXFA	December 4, 2010	1	2:46	Houston, Texas, United States	
Win	1–0	Josh Foster	Submission (leg triangle)	IXFA	October 16, 2010	3	0:58	Houston, Texas, United States	

== See also ==
- List of male mixed martial artists
