= UFC on ESPN: Tsarukyan vs. Gamrot =

Mixed martial arts event in 2022

- The poster for UFC on ESPN: Tsarukyan vs. Gamrot
- Promotion: Ultimate Fighting Championship
- Date: June 25, 2022
- Venue: UFC Apex
- City: Enterprise, Nevada, United States
- Attendance: Not announced

Event chronology
UFC on ESPN: Kattar vs. Emmett	UFC on ESPN: Tsarukyan vs. Gamrot	UFC 276: Adesanya vs. Cannonier

UFC on ESPN: Tsarukyan vs. Gamrot (also known as UFC on ESPN 38 and UFC Vegas 57) was a mixed martial arts event produced by the Ultimate Fighting Championship that took place on June 25, 2022, at the UFC Apex facility in Enterprise, Nevada, part of the Las Vegas Metropolitan Area, United States.

== Background ==
A lightweight bout between Arman Tsarukyan and former KSW Featherweight and Lightweight Champion Mateusz Gamrot headlined the event.

A flyweight bout between Tagir Ulanbekov and Tyson Nam was expected to take place at the event, despite never being officially announced. They were originally expected to meet a year earlier at UFC on ESPN: The Korean Zombie vs. Ige, but the matchup did not take place due to an undisclosed illness for Ulanbekov.

Former UFC Flyweight Championship challenger (also The Ultimate Fighter: Tournament of Champions flyweight winner) Tim Elliott was expected to face Amir Albazi in a flyweight bout. However, Elliott pulled out in mid June due to anterior cruciate ligament (ACL) and meniscus injuries. Albazi was rescheduled against Francisco Figueiredo at UFC 278.

== Results ==
Main card (ESPN / ESPN+)
Weight class				Method	Round	Time	Notes
Lightweight	Mateusz Gamrot	def.	Arman Tsarukyan	Decision (unanimous) (48–47, 48–47, 48–47)	5	5:00
Welterweight	Shavkat Rakhmonov	def.	Neil Magny	Submission (guillotine choke)	2	4:58
Heavyweight	Josh Parisian	def.	Alan Baudot	TKO (punches)	2	3:04
Lightweight	Thiago Moisés	def.	Christos Giagos	Submission (rear-naked choke)	1	3:05
Bantamweight	Umar Nurmagomedov	def.	Nate Maness	Decision (unanimous) (30–27, 30–26, 30–25)	3	5:00
Middleweight	Chris Curtis	def.	Rodolfo Vieira	Decision (unanimous) (29–28, 29–28, 29–28)	3	5:00
Preliminary card (ESPN2 / ESPN+)
Light Heavyweight	Carlos Ulberg	def.	Tafon Nchukwi	TKO (punches)	1	1:15
Featherweight	Shayilan Nuerdanbieke	def.	T.J. Brown	Decision (unanimous) (29–28, 29–28, 29–28)	3	5:00
Bantamweight	Sergey Morozov	def.	Raulian Paiva	Decision (unanimous) (29–28, 29–28, 29–28)	3	5:00
Flyweight	Cody Durden	def.	JP Buys	TKO (punches)	1	1:08
Bantamweight	Mario Bautista	def.	Brian Kelleher	Submission (rear-naked choke)	1	2:27
Women's Strawweight	Vanessa Demopoulos	def.	Jinh Yu Frey	Decision (split) (28–29, 29–28, 30–27)	3	5:00

== Bonus awards ==
The following fighters received $50,000 bonuses.

- Fight of the Night: Mateusz Gamrot vs. Arman Tsarukyan
- Performance of the Night: Shavkat Rakhmonov, Josh Parisian, and Thiago Moisés

== See also ==
- List of UFC events
- List of current UFC fighters
- 2022 in UFC
