= Josh Parisian =

American mixed martial arts fighter

- Born: June 28, 1989 (age 37); Martinsburg, West Virginia, United States
- Height: 6 ft 4 in (1.93 m)
- Weight: 266 lb (121 kg; 19 st 0 lb)
- Division: Heavyweight
- Reach: 79 in (201 cm)
- Team: Scorpion Fighting System
- Years active: 2014–2026

Mixed martial arts record
- Total: 25
- Wins: 16
- By knockout: 12
- By submission: 2
- By decision: 2
- Losses: 9
- By knockout: 4
- By submission: 2
- By decision: 3

Other information
- Mixed martial arts record from Sherdog

Josh Parisian (born June 28, 1989) is an American former mixed martial artist who previously competed in the heavyweight division of the Ultimate Fighting Championship and Oktagon MMA.

== Background ==
Parisian grew up in Escanaba, Michigan after moving from Martinsburg, West Virginia before the second grade. Because of an abusive stepfather – who eventually got jail time for domestic violence – he and his mother stayed a lot in shelters. He graduated from Escanaba Senior High School before attending Bay College for two years. In college, Parisian listened to his classmate's public speaking class speech on UFC and got interested in the sport. He tried it out and felt it improve his self-esteem and confidence, leading to dropping out of college in pursuit of a career in mixed martial arts.

== Mixed martial arts career ==
=== Dana White's Contender Series ===
Racking up a record of 7–2 in the United States regional circuit before being invited to the Dana White's Contender Series. He faced Greg Rebello at Dana White's Contender Series 30 on June 26, 2018. Despite scoring a first-round knockout win, Parisian was not offered a UFC contract directly, but a spot in The Ultimate Fighter: Heavy Hitters.

=== The Ultimate Fighter: Heavy Hitters ===
In the fifth episode of the season, Parisian faced Michel Batista in a quarter-final bout. He lost the fight via second-round technical knockout and was eliminated from the tournament.

=== Return to Contender Series ===
After The Ultimate Fighter, Parisian returned to the regional circuit where he lost the first bout then went on a five-bout winning streak and earned another shot in Dana White's Contender Series. He faced Chad Johnson at Season 4 Week 3 on August 18, 2020. He scored a first-round knockout victory once again and was awarded a UFC contract.

=== Ultimate Fighting Championship ===
Parisian made his UFC debut against Parker Porter on November 28, 2020, at UFC on ESPN: Smith vs. Clark. He lost the bout by unanimous decision.

In his sophomore appearance in the promotion, Parisian faced Roque Martinez at UFC on ESPN: The Korean Zombie vs. Ige on June 19, 2021. He won the bout via controversial split decision. 12 out of 14 media scores gave the victory to Martinez.

Parisian faced Don'Tale Mayes on December 18, 2021, at UFC Fight Night: Lewis vs. Daukaus. He lost the bout via TKO due to elbows from crucifix position in the third round.

Parisian faced Alan Baudot on June 25, 2022, at UFC on ESPN 38. After being dropped in the first round, Parisian rebounded to win the fight via technical knockout in the second round. This win earned him his first Performance of the Night bonus award.

Parisian was scheduled to face Chase Sherman on November 5, 2022, at UFC Fight Night 214. However, Parisian pulled out of the fight hours before it was to take place due to medical issues.

Parisian faced Jamal Pogues on February 18, 2023, at UFC Fight Night 219. He lost the fight via unanimous decision.

Parisian was scheduled to face Walt Harris on July 15, 2023, at UFC on ESPN 49. However, the bout was scrapped by USADA due to a potential anti-doping policy violation by Harris.

Parisian faced Martin Buday on August 12, 2023, at UFC on ESPN: Luque vs. dos Anjos. He lost the fight via a kimura submission in round one.

Parisian faced Robelis Despaigne on March 9, 2024, at UFC 299. He lost the bout via knockout eighteen seconds into the first round.

Parisian was released from the UFC on March 21, 2024.

== Personal life ==
Parisian and his fiancée have a daughter, Eva (born 2020).

== Championships and accomplishments ==
=== Mixed martial arts ===
- Carlos Llinas International Productions
  - CLIP Heavyweight Championship (One time)
- Ultimate Fighting Championship
  - Performance of the Night (One time) vs. Alan Baudot

== Mixed martial arts record ==
Professional record breakdown
25 matches	16 wins	9 losses
By knockout	12	4
By submission	2	2
By decision	2	3

Res.	Record	Opponent	Method	Event	Date	Round	Time	Location	Notes
Loss	16–9	Lazar Todev	TKO (knees to the body)	Oktagon 83	January 31, 2026	2	4:55	Stuttgart, Germany	
Win	16–8	Marcus Maulding	TKO (punches)	WXC 99	December 5, 2025	1	2:50	Flint, Michigan, United States	Catchweight (267.2 lb) bout; Parisian missed weight.
Loss	15–8	Robelis Despaigne	TKO (punches)	UFC 299	March 9, 2024	1	0:18	Miami, Florida, United States	
Loss	15–7	Martin Buday	Submission (kimura)	UFC on ESPN: Luque vs. dos Anjos	August 12, 2023	1	4:11	Las Vegas, Nevada, United States	
Loss	15–6	Jamal Pogues	Decision (unanimous)	UFC Fight Night: Andrade vs. Blanchfield	February 18, 2023	3	5:00	Las Vegas, Nevada, United States	
Win	15–5	Alan Baudot	TKO (punches)	UFC on ESPN: Tsarukyan vs. Gamrot	June 25, 2022	2	3:04	Las Vegas, Nevada, United States	Performance of the Night.
Loss	14–5	Don'Tale Mayes	TKO (elbows)	UFC Fight Night: Lewis vs. Daukaus	December 18, 2021	3	3:26	Las Vegas, Nevada, United States	
Win	14–4	Roque Martinez	Decision (split)	UFC on ESPN: The Korean Zombie vs. Ige	June 19, 2021	3	5:00	Las Vegas, Nevada, United States	
Loss	13–4	Parker Porter	Decision (unanimous)	UFC on ESPN: Smith vs. Clark	November 28, 2020	3	5:00	Las Vegas, Nevada, United States	
Win	13–3	Chad Johnson	KO (punches)	Dana White's Contender Series 30	August 25, 2020	1	3:43	Las Vegas, Nevada, United States	
Win	12–3	Marcus Maulding	TKO (punches)	WXC 86: Warrior Wednesday 11	January 29, 2020	1	3:57	Southgate, Michigan, United States	
Win	11–3	Matunga Djikasa	TKO (punches)	ARES FC 1	December 14, 2019	2	4:16	Dakar, Senegal	
Win	10–3	Charles Brown	TKO (punches)	CLIP: Motor City Cagefights 7	October 18, 2019	1	1:55	Detroit, Michigan, United States	Won the CLIP Heavyweight Championship.
Win	9–3	Victor Jones	TKO (submission to punches)	Smuggler's: Rumble on the River	August 31, 2019	2	2:16	Wyandotte, Michigan, United States	
Win	8–3	Alejandro Santiago	TKO (punches)	NATO: Extreme Warriors 2	April 18, 2019	1	4:41	Mt. Pleasant, Michigan, United States	
Loss	7–3	Brett Martin	Submission (kimura)	Lights Out Championship 2	February 16, 2019	1	1:08	Grand Rapids, Michigan, United States	For the LOC Heavyweight Championship.
Win	7–2	Greg Rebello	KO (spinning backfist)	Dana White's Contender Series 11	June 26, 2018	1	1:31	Las Vegas, Nevada, United States	
Win	6–2	Zach Thumb	TKO (punches)	LFA 38	April 27, 2018	1	2:39	Minneapolis, United States	
Loss	5–2	Tony Lopez	TKO (punches)	KOTC: Supremacy	April 29, 2017	2	3:27	Wyandotte, Michigan, United States	For the KOTC Heavyweight Championship.
Win	5–1	Nathan Bryant	Decision (majority)	Caged Power 11	February 24, 2017	3	5:00	Morgantown, West Virginia, United States	
Win	4–1	Josh Burns	TKO (punches)	TWC Pro Series: Anderson vs. Veerella	November 12, 2016	2	1:50	Lansing, Michigan, United States	
Win	3–1	Anthony Coleman	Submission (triangle choke)	Dual Combat Sports 5	June 25, 2016	2	1:18	Detroit, Michigan, United States	
Win	2–1	Rasheed Oruche	Submission (keylock)	Total Warrior Combat 28	November 21, 2015	2	2:03	Lansing, Michigan, United States	
Loss	1–1	Ryan Pokryfky	Decision (unanimous)	Total Warrior Combat 27	June 20, 2015	3	5:00	Lansing, Michigan, United States	
Win	1–0	Destin Allen	TKO (punches)	Total Warrior Combat 26	November 22, 2014	1	2:25	Lansing, Michigan, United States	

== See also ==
- List of male mixed martial artists
