= Gloria de Paula =

Brazilian mixed martial artist (born 1995)

- Born: 10 June 1995 (age 31); Campinas, Brazil
- Other names: Glorinha
- Height: 5 ft 5 in (1.65 m)
- Weight: 115 lb (52 kg; 8.2 st)
- Division: Strawweight
- Reach: 67.5 in (171 cm)
- Team: Chute Boxe Diego Lima (2015–2021); Fabiana Belai Academia (2021–present)
- Years active: 2017–present

Mixed martial arts record
- Total: 13
- Wins: 6
- By knockout: 3
- By decision: 3
- Losses: 7
- By knockout: 1
- By decision: 6

Other information
- Mixed martial arts record from Sherdog

Gloria de Paula (born June 10, 1995) is a Brazilian mixed martial artist currently competing in the strawweight division. A professional since 2017, she most notably fought in the Ultimate Fighting Championship (UFC).

== Background ==
Daughter of photographers, she worked as a photo model from a young age. Glória was 17 years old and experiencing the pressure of being a third-year high school student when she started training muay thai with her mother to improve her physical conditioning. She liked it so much that she left the entrance exam in the background and started to take the sport more seriously.

The passion rose the first time she watched a UFC event from the stands. In August 2015, she tracked Ronda Rousey knocking out Bethe Correia in just 34 seconds and defending the UFC bantamweight belt. Glória left the event in Rio de Janeiro determined to become an MMA fighter.

== Mixed martial arts career ==
=== Early career ===
She went 4–2, with both of her losses coming to members of the UFC Ariane Carnelossi and Isabella de Padua by way of judges’ decisions, before being invited to Dana White's Contender Series.

=== Dana White's Contender Series ===
de Paula was initially scheduled to face Pauline Macias at Dana White's Contender Series 34 on November 3, 2020. However, de Paula tested positive for COVID-19 and the bout was rescheduled to take place at Dana White's Contender Series 36 on November 17, 2020. She won the fight via unanimous decision and was awarded a UFC contract.

=== Ultimate Fighting Championship ===
de Paula made her promotional debut against Jinh Yu Frey at UFC Fight Night 187 on March 13, 2021. She lost the fight by unanimous decision.

Gloria de Paula made her sophomore appearance against Cheyanne Vlismas at UFC on ESPN: Hall vs. Strickland on July 31, 2021. She lost the bout via first-round ground-and-pound technical knockout after she was knocked down by a head kick.

De Paula faced Diana Belbiţă on February 19, 2022, at UFC Fight Night: Walker vs. Hill. She won the fight via unanimous decision.

De Paula faced Maria Oliveira on June 18, 2022, at UFC on ESPN 37. She lost the bout via split decision. 7 out of 13 media scores gave it to De Paula.

On June 23, 2022, it was announced that De Paula was not re-signed and no longer on the UFC roster.

=== Post UFC ===
De Paula faced Karolina Wójcik on November 16, 2022, at Invicta FC 50 in the Strawweight tournament semifinal, losing via unanimous decision.

De Paula made her LFA debut at LFA 190 against fellow UFC veteran Ashley Yoder on August 23, 2024. She lost the fight via unanimous decision.

== Personal life ==
De Paula is in a relationship with fellow mixed martial artist Mayra Bueno Silva.

== Mixed martial arts record ==
Professional record breakdown
13 matches	6 wins	7 losses
By knockout	3	1
By decision	3	6

Res.	Record	Opponent	Method	Event	Date	Round	Time	Location	Notes
Loss	6–7	Ashley Yoder	Decision (unanimous)	LFA 190	August 23, 2024	3	5:00	Commerce, California, United States	
Loss	6–6	Karolina Wójcik	Decision (unanimous)	Invicta FC 50	November 16, 2022	3	5:00	Denver, Colorado, United States	Invicta FC Strawweight Tournament Semifinal.
Loss	6–5	Maria Oliveira	Decision (split)	UFC on ESPN: Kattar vs. Emmett	June 18, 2022	3	5:00	Austin, Texas, United States	
Win	6–4	Diana Belbiţă	Decision (unanimous)	UFC Fight Night: Walker vs. Hill	February 19, 2022	3	5:00	Las Vegas, Nevada, United States	
Loss	5–4	Cheyanne Vlismas	TKO (head kick and punches)	UFC on ESPN: Hall vs. Strickland	July 31, 2021	1	1:00	Las Vegas, Nevada, United States	
Loss	5–3	Jinh Yu Frey	Decision (unanimous)	UFC Fight Night: Edwards vs. Muhammad	March 13, 2021	3	5:00	Las Vegas, Nevada, United States	
Win	5–2	Pauline Macias	Decision (unanimous)	Dana White's Contender Series 36	November 17, 2020	3	5:00	Las Vegas, Nevada, United States	
Win	4–2	Rafaela Rodrigues	TKO (punches)	Standout Fighting Tournament 16	September 21, 2019	3	2:17	São Paulo, Brazil	
Loss	3–2	Isabela de Pádua	Decision (unanimous)	Standout Fighting Tournament 10	March 30, 2019	3	5:00	São Paulo, Brazil	
Win	3–1	Bruna Vargas	Decision (unanimous)	MMA Experience 5 - Game Edition	December 8, 2018	3	5:00	São Paulo, Brazil	
Win	2–1	Beatriz Gomes	TKO (punches)	Max Fight 20	August 18, 2018	3	4:06	São Paulo, Brazil	
Loss	1–1	Ariane Carnelossi	Decision (unanimous)	Thunder Fight 11	August 4, 2017	3	5:00	São Paulo, Brazil	
Win	1–0	Thuany Valentim Fernandes	TKO (punches)	Batalha MMA 8	July 15, 2017	1	4:59	São Paulo, Brazil	Strawweight debut.

== See also ==
- List of female mixed martial artists
