= Parker Porter =

American mixed martial artist (born 1985)

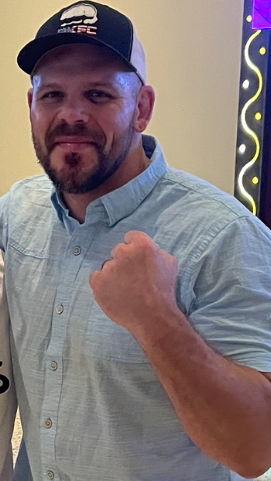
- Porter in 2025
- Born: April 22, 1985 (age 41); Hartford, Connecticut, U.S.
- Height: 6 ft 0 in (183 cm)
- Weight: 264 lb (120 kg; 18 st 12 lb)
- Division: Heavyweight (2007–present); Light Heavyweight (2008)
- Reach: 75 in (191 cm)
- Stance: Orthodox
- Fighting out of: New Britain, Connecticut, United States
- Team: Thornton's MMA; Heavy Hitters Club (2020–present)
- Rank: Black belt in Brazilian Jiu-Jitsu
- Years active: 2007–present

Mixed martial arts record
- Total: 23
- Wins: 14
- By knockout: 6
- By submission: 3
- By decision: 5
- Losses: 9
- By knockout: 5
- By submission: 3
- By disqualification: 1

Other information
- Mixed martial arts record from Sherdog

Parker Porter (born April 22, 1985) is an American mixed martial artist and bare-knuckle boxer who competes in the Heavyweight division at Bare Knuckle Fighting Championship. A professional since 2007, he also competed for the Ultimate Fighting Championship (UFC) and Bellator MMA.

As of April 13, 2026, he is #4 in the BKFC heavyweight rankings.

== Background ==
Porter played baseball, lacrosse and football in his youth, the last from third grade until his graduation from Southington High School. Although he aspired to continue playing football, his poor grades prevented him from playing at the collegiate level. After high school Porter begun working out to lose weight, eventually dabbling in mixed martial arts at the age of 21.

== Mixed martial arts career ==
=== Early career ===
Porter made his professional MMA debut on October 13, 2007 at a Revere, Massachusetts night club, where he won the fight by KO in the third round. He was paid $300 for the bout and fought in front of an audience of 30 people.

After his debut, he went on to compile a 5–2 record in various regional organizations, with one of his losses coming from future UFC Light Heavyweight and Heavyweight Champion Jon Jones. This fight was Porter's only Light Heavyweight bout, and he was knocked out in the first minute after a botched weightcut. During this period, he also captured the Reality Fighting Heavyweight Championship by knocking out Mike Dexter.

Porter would defend the Reality Fighting Heavyweight Championship against Gabriel Gonzaga, who was returning after a layoff and in between UFC stints. Porter would lose the bout after he was submitted with an arm-triangle choke in the third round, losing the Reality Fighting Heavyweight Championship.

=== Bellator ===
Porter would sign with Bellator MMA and was scheduled to face Randy Smith at Bellator 63 on March 30, 2012. However, Smith withdrew due to illness and the bout was scrapped.

Porter eventually made his Bellator debut against Josh Diekmann on September 7, 2013, at Bellator 98, losing via TKO in the first round.

After a layoff of almost a year and half, he made his sophomore bout for Bellator on July 17, 2015, at Bellator 140 against Eric Bedard. He won the bout via second-round keylock submission.

=== Return to regional circuit ===
He had a layoff off almost 3 years due to personal issues and having to secure his family financially, he returned January 6, 2018 at Reality Fighting where he won by 3rd-round TKO against J.A. Dudley.

Porter made his CES MMA debut against Keith Bell on November 2, 2018, at CES MMA 53. Parker Porter was seemingly on his way to a first-round victory via ground-and-pound blows. However, referee Kevin MacDonald warned him several times about punching to the back of the head and eventually called for time at the 2:30 mark of the first round. When Bell was deemed unfit to continue, he was awarded the win via disqualification.

Porter was scheduled to face Rakim Cleveland at CES MMA 55 on March 29, 2019. However, the bout was cancelled due to an unknown reason.

Porter faced Kevin Ray Sears on May 31, 2019, at CES MMA 56. In a dominant performance, Porter finished Sears via 2nd round kimura.

Porter faced Dirlei Broenstrup on September 7, 2019, at CES MMA 58. He won via 3rd-round TKO.

=== Ultimate Fighting Championship ===
Porter made his UFC debut on nine days' notice against Chris Daukaus on August 15, 2020, at UFC 252. He lost the fight via TKO in round one.

Porter faced Josh Parisian on November 28, 2020, at UFC on ESPN: Smith vs. Clark. He won the bout by unanimous decision.

Porter was scheduled to face Chase Sherman on April 17, 2021, at UFC on ESPN 22. However, he was removed from the event for undisclosed reasons and was replaced by Andrei Arlovski.

Porter faced Chase Sherman on August 21, 2021, at UFC on ESPN 29. He won the fight via unanimous decision.

Porter faced Alan Baudot on February 19, 2022, at UFC Fight Night: Walker vs. Hill. He won the fight via unanimous decision.

Porter faced Jailton Almeida on May 21, 2022, at UFC Fight Night 206. He lost the fight via rear-naked choke in round one.

Porter was scheduled to face Hamdy Abdelwahab on October 22, 2022, at UFC 280. However, Abdelwahab was removed from the event for unknown reasons and he was replaced by Slim Trabelsi. In turn, the pairing was cancelled altogether as Trabelsi pulled out due to contractual issues with ARES FC and Porter opted to pursue a later fight, rather than a replacement barring unforeseen circumstances.

Porter faced Justin Tafa on February 12, 2023, at UFC 284. He lost the fight via knockout in the first round.

As the last fight of his prevailing contract, Porter faced Braxton Smith on May 6, 2023, at UFC 288. He won the fight by TKO in the first round.

Porter faced Junior Tafa on August 26, 2023, at UFC Fight Night 225. He lost the bout via knockout in the first round.

On December 21, 2023, it was announced that Porter was no longer on the UFC roster.

== Bare-knuckle boxing ==
On January 2, 2025 after over a year-long hiatus, it was announced via social media that Porter would be making his bare-knuckle debut on February 1 against Chase Gormley at BKFC on DAZN 4 in his home state of Connecticut. Porter would go on to win that fight by knockout in the first minute of the first round.

During the broadcast of BKFC 73, it was announced that Porter will be returning to the ring on June 14 in a main event bout against Dillon Cleckler at BKFC Fight Night 26. He won the fight by knockout in the first round.

Porter defeated Anthony Garrett on December 20, 2025 via KO in the second round at BKFC Fight Night 33.

Porter faced Josh Watson on March 28, 2026 in the main event at BKFC Fight Night Mohegan Sun: Porter vs. Watson. He won the fight by technical knockout due to a doctor stoppage at the end of the third round.

== Personal life ==
Porter has twin boys born in 2013 and a third son born in 2020.

== Championships and achievements ==
=== Mixed martial arts ===
- Reality Fighting
  - Reality Fighting Heavyweight Championship (One time)

== Mixed martial arts record ==
Professional record breakdown
23 matches	14 wins	9 losses
By knockout	6	5
By submission	3	3
By decision	5	0
By disqualification	0	1

Res.	Record	Opponent	Method	Event	Date	Round	Time	Location	Notes
Loss	14–9	Junior Tafa	KO (punch)	UFC Fight Night: Holloway vs. The Korean Zombie	August 26, 2023	1	1:24	Kallang, Singapore	
Win	14–8	Braxton Smith	TKO (punches)	UFC 288	May 6, 2023	1	2:10	Newark, New Jersey, United States	Smith tested positive for testosterone.
Loss	13–8	Justin Tafa	KO (punches)	UFC 284	February 12, 2023	1	1:06	Perth, Australia	
Loss	13–7	Jailton Almeida	Submission (rear-naked choke)	UFC Fight Night: Holm vs. Vieira	May 21, 2022	1	4:35	Las Vegas, Nevada, United States	
Win	13–6	Alan Baudot	Decision (unanimous)	UFC Fight Night: Walker vs. Hill	February 19, 2022	3	5:00	Las Vegas, Nevada, United States	
Win	12–6	Chase Sherman	Decision (unanimous)	UFC on ESPN: Cannonier vs. Gastelum	August 21, 2021	3	5:00	Las Vegas, Nevada, United States	
Win	11–6	Josh Parisian	Decision (unanimous)	UFC on ESPN: Smith vs. Clark	November 28, 2020	3	5:00	Las Vegas, Nevada, United States	
Loss	10–6	Chris Daukaus	TKO (punches and knee)	UFC 252	August 15, 2020	1	4:28	Las Vegas, Nevada, United States	
Win	10–5	Dirlei Broenstrup	TKO (punches)	CES MMA 58	September 7, 2019	3	3:17	Hartford, Connecticut, United States	
Win	9–5	Kevin Ray Sears	Submission (kimura)	CES MMA 56	May 31, 2019	2	2:29	Hartford, Connecticut, United States	
Loss	8–5	Keith Bell	DQ (punches to back of head)	CES MMA 53	November 2, 2018	1	2:30	Lincoln, Rhode Island, United States	
Win	8–4	J.A. Dudley	TKO (punches)	Reality Fighting: Mohegan Sun	January 6, 2018	3	1:16	Uncasville, Connecticut, United States	
Win	7–4	Eric Bedard	Submission (keylock)	Bellator 140	July 17, 2015	2	2:51	Uncasville, Connecticut, United States	
Loss	6–4	Josh Diekmann	TKO (punches)	Bellator 98	September 7, 2013	1	1:12	Uncasville, Connecticut, United States	
Loss	6–3	Gabriel Gonzaga	Submission (arm-triangle choke)	Reality Fighting: Mohegan Fight Night 4	October 8, 2011	3	1:50	Uncasville, Connecticut, United States	Lost the Reality Fighting Heavyweight Championship.
Win	6–2	Mike Dexter	KO (punches)	Reality Fighting: Mohegan Fight Night 2	February 26, 2011	1	1:36	Uncasville, Connecticut, United States	Won the vacant Reality Fighting Heavyweight Championship.
Loss	5–2	Gabriel Salinas-Jones	Submission (neck crank)	XFC 13	December 3, 2010	1	4:50	Tampa Bay, Florida, United States	
Win	5–1	Gabriel Salinas-Jones	Decision (unanimous)	XFC 12	October 10, 2010	3	5:00	Kyrenia, Cyprus	
Win	4–1	Lee Beane	Submission (rear-naked choke)	CES MMA 1	September 17, 2010	1	2:36	Lincoln, Rhode Island, United States	
Win	3–1	Mark Hoxie	TKO (submission to punches)	Reality Fighting 26	November 7, 2009	1	1:09	Plymouth, Massachusetts, United States	Return to Heavyweight.
Loss	2–1	Jon Jones	KO (punch)	WCF 3	June 20, 2008	1	0:36	Wilmington, Massachusetts, United States	Light Heavyweight debut.
Win	2–0	Randy Smith	Decision (unanimous)	Combat Zone 25	January 12, 2008	3	4:00	Revere, Massachusetts, United States	
Win	1–0	Kiplagott Stewart	KO (punches)	Combat Zone 24	October 13, 2007	3	0:16	Revere, Massachusetts, United States	Heavyweight debut.

== Bare-knuckle boxing record ==
Professional record breakdown
4 matches	4 wins	0 losses
By knockout	4	0

Res.	Record	Opponent	Method	Event	Date	Round	Time	Location	Notes
Win	4–0	Haze Wilson	TKO (doctor stoppage)	BKFC Fight Night Mohegan Sun: Porter vs. Wilson	March 28, 2026	3	2:00	Uncasville, Connecticut, United States	
Win	3–0	Anthony Garrett	KO (punches)	BKFC Fight Night Mohegan Sun: Porter vs. Garrett	December 20, 2025	2	0:48	Uncasville, Connecticut, United States	
Win	2–0	Dillon Cleckler	KO (punches)	BKFC Fight Night Mohegan Sun: Porter vs. Cleckler	June 14, 2025	1	1:08	Uncasville, Connecticut, United States	
Win	1–0	Chase Gormley	KO (punch)	BKFC on DAZN Mohegan Sun: Lane vs. VanCamp	February 1, 2025	1	0:44	Uncasville, Connecticut, United States	

== See also ==
- List of male mixed martial artists
