= Mateusz Gamrot =

Polish mixed martial artist (born 1990)

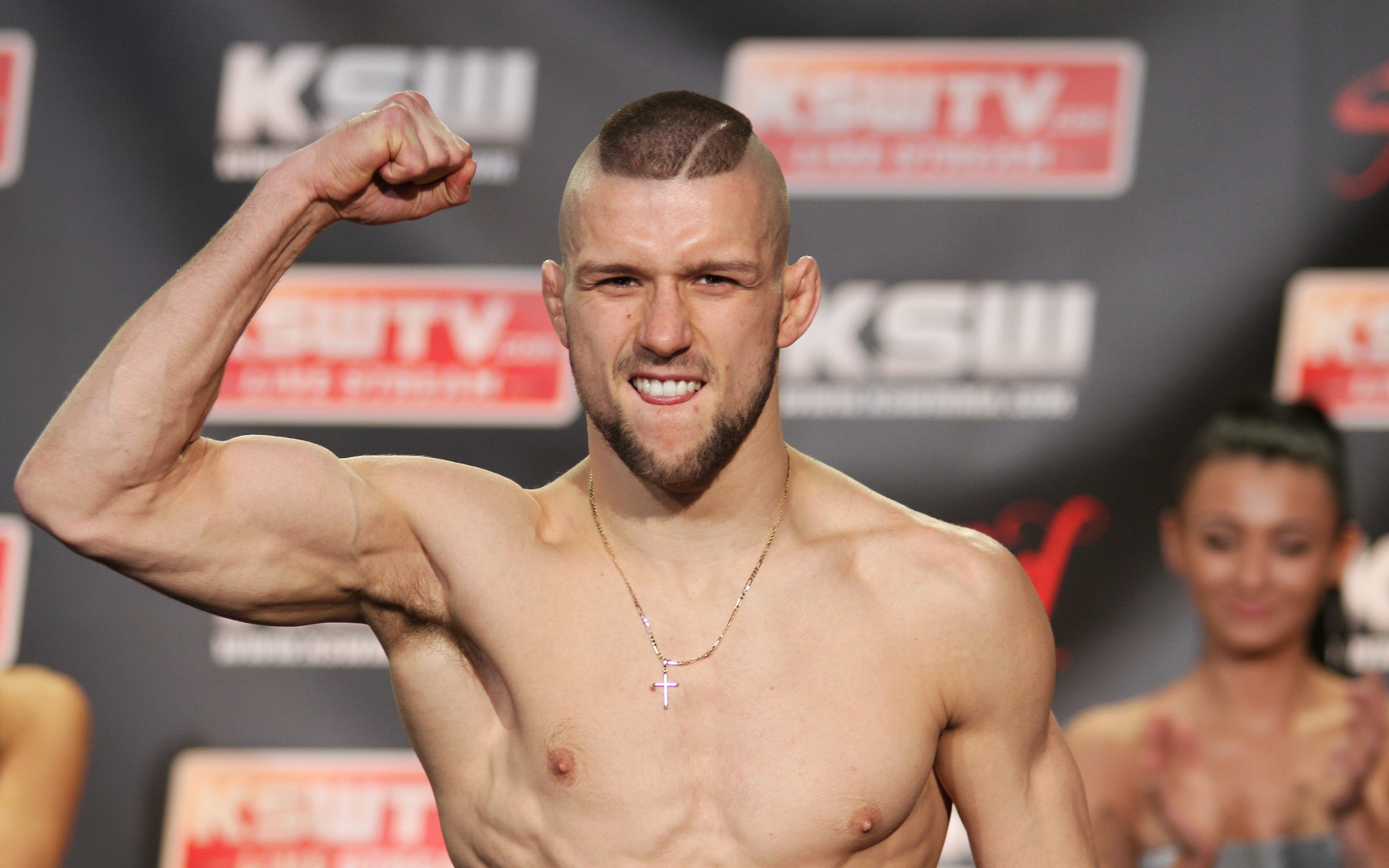
- Born: December 11, 1990 (age 35); Bielsko-Biała, Silesian Voivodeship, Poland
- Other names: Gamer
- Height: 5 ft 10 in (1.78 m)
- Weight: 155 lb (70 kg; 11 st 1 lb)
- Division: Lightweight (2012–present); Featherweight (2018)
- Reach: 71 in (180 cm)
- Style: Submission Grappling, Freestyle Wrestling
- Stance: Southpaw
- Fighting out of: Poznań, Greater Poland, Poland
- Team: Ankos MMA (until 2017); Czerwony Smok (2017–present); American Top Team (2018–present)
- Rank: Black belt in Brazilian Jiu-Jitsu under Przemo Gnat
- Years active: 2012–present

Mixed martial arts record
- Total: 32
- Wins: 26
- By knockout: 8
- By submission: 6
- By decision: 12
- Losses: 5
- By submission: 2
- By decision: 3
- No contests: 1

Other information
- Mixed martial arts record from Sherdog

Mateusz Gamrot (born December 11, 1990) is a Polish professional mixed martial artist. He currently competes in the Lightweight division of the Ultimate Fighting Championship (UFC). Gamrot is a former KSW Featherweight Champion and KSW Lightweight Champion. As of 10 August 2026, he is #9 in the Meta UFC lightweight rankings.

== Background ==
Gamrot started wrestling at the age of ten. At middle school age, he moved to a boarding school in Milicz to train in freestyle wrestling. While studying in a technical school, he was part of the national wrestling team where he won medals in the Polish junior and youth championships. As a 20-year-old he permanently relocated to Poznań, where he trains and has a wife and two children.

He began his wrestling career in 2002, achieving success at the national and international level. He competed in over 300 matches including ones at the European and World Championships. He transitioned to mixed martial arts in 2011, training under, Andrzej Kościelski, World Champion in wrestling.

In 2012, he won a gold medal in the 70 kg category of the European Amateur MMA Championships (Brussels), defending his title the following year (Budapest).

He won the gold medal at the Polish grappling championships in the purple belt category (Luboń) in 2013 and 2014. In 2014 he won the ADCC Submission Wrestling European championships in the 77 kg category.

== Mixed martial arts career ==
=== Konfrontacja Sztuk Walki ===
He made his professional MMA debut on February 4, 2012, at XFS Night of Champions, defeating Chechen Arbi Shamayev. By the end of the year he had won two more fights for the federation and signed with KSW. On June 8, 2013, he had his first fight in KSW, beating Mateusz Zawadzki via TKO at KSW 23: Khalidov vs. Manhoef. On September 28 at KSW 24 he defeated former UFC fighter Andre Winner by unanimous decision. At KSW 27, Mateusz defeated Jefferson George on points.

On September 13, 2014, he made his promotional debut for Cage Warriors, defeating Welshman Tim Newman in the 1st round with a heel hook submission at CW 72. He returned to KSW on December 6, 2014, to defeat Łukasz Chlewicki at KSW 29 via unanimous decision. At KSW 30 on February 21, 2015, he defeated Brazilian Rodrigo Cavalheiro Correia by technical knockout six seconds before the final bell. Gamrot earned a Knockout of the Night bonus for his performance.

At KSW 32: Road to Wembley, Mateusz defeated Marif Piraev via TKO in the second round, improving his record to 10-0.

==== KSW Lightweight Championship ====
On May 27, 2016, at KSW 35, he fought for the vacant KSW Lightweight Championship belt against former British BAMMA and Russian M-1 Global champion Frenchman Mansour Barnaoui. He won the title via unanimous decision. Both fighters were awarded the Fight of the Night bonus.

At KSW 36: Materla vs. Palhares on October 1, 2016, he defended his title via heel hook against Renato Gomes Gabriel in the second round.

Gamrot faced former UFC fighter Norman Parke at KSW 39: Colosseum on May 27, 2017. He won the bout and retained the title via unanimous decision.

Gamrot rematched Norman Parke at KSW 40: Dublin on October 22, 2017. At the weigh-ins, Parke came in one pound over the championship limit and the bout was declared a non-title bout. The bout was stopped in the second round when accidental eye pokes left Parke unable to continue. Following this Parke shoved Gamrot's cornerman, Borys Mankowski, which resulted in Marcin Bilman, another professional fighter who was in the champion's corner, punching Parke. Gamrot was subsequently fined 30% of his purse and Bilman was handed a two-year ban from KSW events.

On March 3, 2018, at KSW 42: Khalidov vs. Narkun, Gamrot defeated Grzegorz Szulakowski via keylock submission in the fourth round, defending the KSW Lightweight Championship.

==== Two-division champion ====
On December 1, 2018, at KSW 46: Narkun vs. Khalidov 2, he fought for a second belt, this time for the KSW Featherweight Championship, against submission specialist Kleber Koike Erbst, where he won the bout after a five-round domination, capturing the organization's second crown.

==== Vacating the titles ====
On May 17, 2019, in a video on Borys Mankowski's YouTube channel, Gamrot announced that he had vacated his two belts and did not renew his contract with KSW.

On March 6, 2020, KSW announced Gamrot's return to the organization. The KSW double champion was scheduled to return at KSW 53 in Łódź, Poland against the Brazilian Edimilson Souza, but due to the coronavirus pandemic the event was canceled. On July 11 he fought his third bout at KSW 53: Reborn against Norman Parke. Parke missed weight for the bout and was fined, which went to Gamrot. Gamrot won the fight in the third round via technical knockout.

On August 29, 2020, he fought for the last time under his KSW contract against Marian Ziółkowski at KSW 54: Gamrot vs. Ziółkowski, who replaced the injured Shamil Musayev. After a 5-round bout, Gamrot won via unanimous decision.

=== Ultimate Fighting Championship ===
==== 2020 ====
On September 17, 2020, it was announced that Gamrot signed with the Ultimate Fighting Championship.

Gamrot, as a replacement for Renato Moicano, was scheduled to face Magomed Mustafaev at UFC Fight Night: Ortega vs. The Korean Zombie on October 18, 2020. In turn, Mustafaev pulled out in early October due to undisclosed reasons. Gamrot faced fellow promotional newcomer Guram Kutateladze instead. He lost the close fight via split decision. Both fighters earned the Fight of the Night award.

==== 2021 ====
Gamrot faced Scott Holtzman on April 10, 2021, at UFC on ABC: Vettori vs. Holland. He won the fight via knockout in the second round. This win earned him the Performance of the Night award.

Gamrot faced Jeremy Stephens on July 17, 2021, at UFC on ESPN: Makhachev vs. Moisés. He won the fight via kimura in round one, this submission is the quickest of its kind in UFC history. This win earned him the Performance of the Night award.

As the first bout of his new four-fight contract, Gamrot faced Carlos Diego Ferreira on December 18, 2021, at UFC Fight Night: Lewis vs. Daukaus. He won the bout via TKO in round two, forcing Ferreira to submit with a knee to the body.

==== 2022 ====
Gamrot faced Arman Tsarukyan on June 25, 2022, at UFC on ESPN 38. He won the closely contested fight via unanimous decision. 15 of 22 MMA media outlets scored the bout in favor of Tsarukyan. Both fighters earned the Fight of the Night award.

As the first fight of his four-fight contract, Gamrot faced Beneil Dariush on October 22, 2022, at UFC 280. He lost the fight by unanimous decision.

==== 2023 ====
Gamrot, replacing Dan Hooker, faced Jalin Turner on March 4, 2023, at UFC 285. In a closely contested bout where Gamrot employed his wrestling to combat Turner’s reach advantage, he won the bout via split decision.

Gamrot faced Rafael Fiziev on September 23, 2023, at UFC Fight Night 228 He won the fight via technical knockout due to knee injury in round two.

In October 2023, Gamrot served as the backup fighter for the main event of UFC 294.

==== 2024 ====
Gamrot faced Rafael dos Anjos on March 9, 2024, at UFC 299. He won the bout by unanimous decision.

Gamrot faced Dan Hooker on August 17, 2024 at UFC 305. He lost the fight by split decision. 9 out of 16 media outlets scored the bout for Gamrot. This fight earned him another Fight of the Night award.

==== 2025 ====
Gamrot was reportedly going to face Rafael Fiziev in a rematch on February 1, 2025 at UFC Fight Night 250. However, the bout was never officially scheduled for the event.

Gamrot faced Ľudovít Klein on May 31, 2025, at UFC on ESPN 68. He won the fight by unanimous decision.

Replacing Rafael Fiziev on short notice, Gamrot faced former UFC Lightweight Champion Charles Oliveira on October 11, 2025 in the main event of UFC Fight Night 261. Gamrot lost the fight via a face crank submission in the second round, resulting in his first defeat by finish.

==== 2026 ====
Gamrot faced Esteban Ribovics on April 11, 2026, at UFC 327. He won the fight via an arm-triangle choke submission in the second round.

Gamrot faced Quillan Salkilld in the main event on August 8, 2026 at UFC Fight Night 284. He lost the fight via a rear-naked choke submission in the first round.

== Submission grappling career ==
Gamrot has been invited to compete in the under 77 kg division at ADCC 2026.

== Championships and accomplishments ==
=== Mixed martial arts ===
- Ultimate Fighting Championship
  - Performance of the Night (Two times) vs. Scott Holtzman and Jeremy Stephens
  - Fight of the Night (Three times) vs. Guram Kutateladze, Arman Tsarukyan and Dan Hooker
  - Fastest submission by kimura in UFC history (65 seconds) (vs Jeremy Stephens)
  - Fourth most takedowns landed in UFC Lightweight division history (54)
  - UFC Honors Awards
    - 2024: President's Choice Fight of the Year Nominee vs. Dan Hooker
  - UFC.com Awards
    - 2022: Ranked #9 Fight of the Year vs. Arman Tsarukyan
    - 2024: Ranked #8 Fight of the Year vs. Dan Hooker
- Konfrontacja Sztuk Walki
  - KSW Lightweight Championship (one time; former)
    - Three successful title defenses
  - KSW Featherweight Championship (one time; former)
  - Knockout of the Night (one time) vs. Rodrigo Cavalheiro
  - Fight of the Night (one time) vs. Mansour Barnaoui
- Herakles
  - 2021 Fighter of the Year
- Combat Press
  - 2024 Fight of the Year vs. Dan Hooker at UFC 305
- MMA Mania
  - 2024 #3 Ranked Fight of the Year vs. Dan Hooker at UFC 305

=== Grappling ===
- 2014: ADCC European Championship - 1st place in 77 kg category (Sofia)
- 2015: Great Britain NAGA Championship - 1st place in the 79.5 kg class and 1st place in the 79.5 kg legs (London)
- 2015: ADCC European Championship - 3rd place in 77 kg class (Turku)
- 2016: VI Polish No-Gi Championships - 1st place in 79.5 kg category, purple stripes (Luboń)
- 2016: XII Polish ADCC Championships - 1st place in the 77 kg category
- 2018: ADCC European Championship - 2nd place in the 77 kg category (Bucharest)
- 2019: ADCC European Championship - 1st place in 77 kg class (Poznań)

== Mixed martial arts record ==
Professional record breakdown
32 matches	26 wins	5 losses
By knockout	8	0
By submission	6	2
By decision	12	3
No contests	1	

Res.	Record	Opponent	Method	Event	Date	Round	Time	Location	Notes
Loss	26–5 (1)	Quillan Salkilld	Submission (rear-naked choke)	UFC Fight Night: Gamrot vs. Salkilld	August 8, 2026	1	4:25	Las Vegas, Nevada, United States	
Win	26–4 (1)	Esteban Ribovics	Submission (arm-triangle choke)	UFC 327	April 11, 2026	2	4:19	Miami, Florida, United States	
Loss	25–4 (1)	Charles Oliveira	Submission (face crank)	UFC Fight Night: Oliveira vs. Gamrot	October 11, 2025	2	2:48	Rio de Janeiro, Brazil	
Win	25–3 (1)	Ľudovít Klein	Decision (unanimous)	UFC on ESPN: Gamrot vs. Klein	May 31, 2025	3	5:00	Las Vegas, Nevada, United States	
Loss	24–3 (1)	Dan Hooker	Decision (split)	UFC 305	August 18, 2024	3	5:00	Perth, Australia	Fight of the Night.
Win	24–2 (1)	Rafael dos Anjos	Decision (unanimous)	UFC 299	March 9, 2024	3	5:00	Miami, Florida, United States	
Win	23–2 (1)	Rafael Fiziev	TKO (knee injury)	UFC Fight Night: Fiziev vs. Gamrot	September 23, 2023	2	2:03	Las Vegas, Nevada, United States	
Win	22–2 (1)	Jalin Turner	Decision (split)	UFC 285	March 4, 2023	3	5:00	Las Vegas, Nevada, United States	
Loss	21–2 (1)	Beneil Dariush	Decision (unanimous)	UFC 280	October 22, 2022	3	5:00	Abu Dhabi, United Arab Emirates	
Win	21–1 (1)	Arman Tsarukyan	Decision (unanimous)	UFC on ESPN: Tsarukyan vs. Gamrot	June 25, 2022	5	5:00	Las Vegas, Nevada, United States	Fight of the Night.
Win	20–1 (1)	Carlos Diego Ferreira	TKO (submission to knee to the body)	UFC Fight Night: Lewis vs. Daukaus	December 18, 2021	2	3:26	Las Vegas, Nevada, United States	
Win	19–1 (1)	Jeremy Stephens	Submission (kimura)	UFC on ESPN: Makhachev vs. Moisés	July 17, 2021	1	1:05	Las Vegas, Nevada, United States	Performance of the Night.
Win	18–1 (1)	Scott Holtzman	KO (punches)	UFC on ABC: Vettori vs. Holland	April 10, 2021	2	1:22	Las Vegas, Nevada, United States	Performance of the Night.
Loss	17–1 (1)	Guram Kutateladze	Decision (split)	UFC Fight Night: Ortega vs. The Korean Zombie	October 18, 2020	3	5:00	Abu Dhabi, United Arab Emirates	Fight of the Night.
Win	17–0 (1)	Marian Ziółkowski	Decision (unanimous)	KSW 54	August 29, 2020	5	5:00	Warsaw, Poland	Defended the KSW Lightweight Championship.
Win	16–0 (1)	Norman Parke	TKO (doctor stoppage)	KSW 53	July 11, 2020	3	3:02	Warsaw, Poland	Return to Lightweight; Parke missed weight (158.3 lb).
Win	15–0 (1)	Kleber Koike Erbst	Decision (unanimous)	KSW 46	December 1, 2018	5	5:00	Gliwice, Poland	Featherweight debut. Won the vacant KSW Featherweight Championship.
Win	14–0 (1)	Grzegorz Szulakowski	Submission (keylock)	KSW 42	March 3, 2018	4	4:15	Łódź, Poland	Defended the KSW Lightweight Championship.
NC	13–0 (1)	Norman Parke	NC (accidental eye poke)	KSW 40	October 22, 2017	2	4:39	Dublin, Ireland	Non-title bout; Parke missed weight (156.1 lb). Accidental eye poke rendered Parke unable to continue.
Win	13–0	Norman Parke	Decision (unanimous)	KSW 39	May 27, 2017	3	5:00	Warsaw, Poland	Defended the KSW Lightweight Championship.
Win	12–0	Renato Gomes Gabriel	Submission (heel hook)	KSW 36	October 1, 2016	2	3:46	Zielona Góra, Poland	Defended the KSW Lightweight Championship.
Win	11–0	Mansour Barnaoui	Decision (unanimous)	KSW 35	May 27, 2016	3	5:00	Gdańsk, Poland	Won the vacant KSW Lightweight Championship. Fight of the Night.
Win	10–0	Marif Piraev	TKO (punches)	KSW 32	October 31, 2015	2	3:21	London, England	
Win	9–0	Rodrigo Cavalheiro Correia	TKO (punches)	KSW 30	February 21, 2015	3	4:54	Poznań, Poland	Knockout of the Night.
Win	8–0	Łukasz Chlewicki	Decision (unanimous)	KSW 29	December 6, 2014	3	5:00	Kraków, Poland	
Win	7–0	Tim Newman	Submission (heel hook)	Cage Warriors 72	September 13, 2014	1	1:37	Newport, Wales	
Win	6–0	Jefferson George	Decision (unanimous)	KSW 27	May 17, 2014	3	5:00	Gdańsk, Poland	
Win	5–0	Andre Winner	Decision (unanimous)	KSW 24	September 28, 2013	3	5:00	Łódź, Poland	
Win	4–0	Mateusz Zawadzki	TKO (corner stoppage)	KSW 23	June 8, 2013	2	5:00	Gdańsk, Poland	
Win	3–0	Tomáš Deák	Decision (unanimous)	Night of Champions 5	October 20, 2012	2	5:00	Poznań, Poland	
Win	2–0	Tomasz Matuszewski	Submission (guillotine choke)	Night of Champions 4	April 21, 2012	1	1:11	Poznań, Poland	Won the NoC Lightweight Tournament.
Win	1–0	Arbi Shamaev	TKO (doctor stoppage)	Night of Champions 3	February 4, 2012	2	3:59	Poznań, Poland	Lightweight debut.

== See also ==
- List of current UFC fighters
- List of male mixed martial artists
- Double champions in MMA
