= Don'Tale Mayes =

American mixed martial arts fighter

- Born: Don'Tale O'Neil Mayes; 16 January 1992 (age 34); Louisville, Kentucky, U.S.
- Other names: Lord Kong
- Height: 6 ft 6 in (1.98 m)
- Weight: 264 lb (120 kg; 18 st 12 lb)
- Division: Heavyweight
- Reach: 81 in (206 cm)
- Fighting out of: Albuquerque, New Mexico, U.S.
- Team: Jackson Wink MMA Academy
- Years active: 2016–present

Mixed martial arts record
- Total: 22
- Wins: 11
- By knockout: 6
- By submission: 1
- By decision: 4
- Losses: 10
- By knockout: 1
- By submission: 3
- By decision: 5
- By disqualification: 1
- No contests: 1

Other information
- University: Ancilla College
- Mixed martial arts record from Sherdog

Don'Tale O'Neil Mayes (born January 16, 1992) is an American professional mixed martial artist. He competed in the Heavyweight division of the Ultimate Fighting Championship (UFC), achieving a 4–7 record, and 1 no contest in the promotion.

== Background ==
Born and raised in Kentucky, Mayes begun training martial arts to discharge his aggression. He initially picked up judo before transitioning to other disciplines as well. In judo he claimed Kansas and Indiana state championships. Mayes attended Ancilla College but did not receive a degree.

== Mixed martial arts career ==
=== Early career ===
Mayes competed as an amateur from 2014 to 2015, compiling an undefeated 8–0 record. Mayes then compiled a 3-1 professional record, winning the Hoosier FC Heavyweight Championship in only his second fight. He was invited to participate in Dana White's Contender Series 8 of Dana White's Tuesday Night Contender Series. Mayes faced Allen Crowder, losing by technical knockout in the third round. He appeared twice more on the Contender Series, winning both fights by stoppage, earning his UFC contract on the second try.

=== Ultimate Fighting Championship ===
Don'Tale Mayes made his UFC debut against Ciryl Gane on October 26, 2019, at UFC Fight Night: Maia vs. Askren. He lost the fight by a heel hook in the third round.

Mayes faced Rodrigo Nascimento on May 16, 2020, at UFC on ESPN: Overeem vs. Harris. He lost the fight via second round rear naked choke.

Mayes faced Roque Martinez on November 14, 2020 UFC Fight Night: Felder vs. dos Anjos. He won the fight via unanimous decision.

Mayes was scheduled to face Tai Tuivasa on March 20, 2021, at UFC on ESPN: Brunson vs. Holland. However, Mayes was removed from the fight during the week leading up to the event for undisclosed reasons and was replaced by promotional newcomer Harry Hunsucker.

Mayes faced Josh Parisian on December 18, 2021, at UFC Fight Night: Lewis vs. Daukaus. He won the bout via TKO in the third round.

Mayes was scheduled to face Justin Tafa on July 30, 2022, at UFC 277. Tafa pulled out due to undisclosed reasons and was replaced by promotional newcomer Hamdy Abdelwahab on July 18. Mayes lost the back-and-forth fight via split decision. However, the fight was later ruled a no contest after Abdelwahab was suspended by USADA, due to Abdelwahab failing to disclose a history of using Methenolone before joining the UFC and testing positive thereafter.

Mayes faced Augusto Sakai on February 25, 2023, at UFC Fight Night 220. He lost the fight via unanimous decision.

Mayes faced Andrei Arlovski on June 3, 2023, at UFC on ESPN 46. He won the fight via technical knockout in the second round.

Mayes faced Rodrigo Nascimento in a rematch on November 4, 2023, at UFC Fight Night 231. He lost the fight via unanimous decision.

Mayes faced Caio Machado on April 27, 2024, at UFC on ESPN 55. He won the fight by unanimous decision.

Mayes faced Shamil Gaziev on August 3, 2024, at UFC on ABC 7. He lost the fight by unanimous decision.

Mayes faced Valter Walker on February 15, 2025, at UFC Fight Night 251. He lost the fight via a heel hook submission in the first round.

Mayes faced Thomas Petersen on May 3, 2025, at UFC on ESPN 67. He lost the fight by unanimous decision.

On May 7, 2025, it was reported that Mayes was released by the UFC.

== Championships and accomplishments ==
- Hoosier Fight Club
  - Hoosier FC Heavyweight Championship (One time)

== Mixed martial arts record ==
Professional record breakdown
22 matches	11 wins	10 losses
By knockout	6	1
By submission	1	3
By decision	4	5
By disqualification	0	1
No contests	1	

Res.	Record	Opponent	Method	Event	Date	Round	Time	Location	Notes
Loss	11–10 (1)	Jake Craig	Decision (unanimous)	Unified MMA 69	September 18, 2026	5	5:00	Edmonton, Alberta, Canada	
Loss	11–9 (1)	Thomas Petersen	Decision (unanimous)	UFC on ESPN: Sandhagen vs. Figueiredo	May 3, 2025	3	5:00	Des Moines, Iowa, United States	
Loss	11–8 (1)	Valter Walker	Submission (heel hook)	UFC Fight Night: Cannonier vs. Rodrigues	February 15, 2025	1	1:17	Las Vegas, Nevada, United States	
Loss	11–7 (1)	Shamil Gaziev	Decision (unanimous)	UFC on ABC: Sandhagen vs. Nurmagomedov	August 3, 2024	3	5:00	Abu Dhabi, United Arab Emirates	
Win	11–6 (1)	Caio Machado	Decision (unanimous)	UFC on ESPN: Nicolau vs. Perez	April 27, 2024	3	5:00	Las Vegas, Nevada, United States	
Loss	10–6 (1)	Rodrigo Nascimento	Decision (unanimous)	UFC Fight Night: Almeida vs. Lewis	November 4, 2023	3	5:00	São Paulo, Brazil	
Win	10–5 (1)	Andrei Arlovski	TKO (punches)	UFC on ESPN: Kara-France vs. Albazi	June 3, 2023	2	3:17	Las Vegas, Nevada, United States	
Loss	9–5 (1)	Augusto Sakai	Decision (unanimous)	UFC Fight Night: Muniz vs. Allen	February 25, 2023	3	5:00	Las Vegas, Nevada, United States	
NC	9–4 (1)	Hamdy Abdelwahab	NC (overturned)	UFC 277	July 30, 2022	3	5:00	Dallas, Texas, United States	Originally a split decision win for Abdelwahab; overturned after he tested positive for methenolone.
Win	9–4	Josh Parisian	TKO (elbows)	UFC Fight Night: Lewis vs. Daukaus	December 18, 2021	3	3:26	Las Vegas, Nevada, United States	
Win	8–4	Roque Martinez	Decision (unanimous)	UFC Fight Night: Felder vs. dos Anjos	November 14, 2020	3	5:00	Las Vegas, Nevada, United States	
Loss	7–4	Rodrigo Nascimento	Submission (rear-naked choke)	UFC on ESPN: Overeem vs. Harris	May 16, 2020	2	2:05	Jacksonville, Florida, United States	
Loss	7–3	Ciryl Gane	Submission (heel hook)	UFC Fight Night: Maia vs. Askren	October 26, 2019	3	4:46	Kallang, Singapore	
Win	7–2	Ricardo Prasel	TKO (punches)	Dana White's Contender Series 20	July 16, 2019	1	4:59	Las Vegas, Nevada, United States	
Win	6–2	Nkemdirim Oti	Submission (verbal)	V3 Fights 71	November 17, 2018	3	2:15	Robinsonville, Mississippi, United States	
Win	5–2	Mitchell Sipe	TKO (punches)	Dana White's Contender Series 15	July 31, 2018	2	4:49	Las Vegas, Nevada, United States	
Win	4–2	Mohammed Usman	Decision (unanimous)	Victory FC 60	April 14, 2018	3	5:00	Hammond, Indiana, United States	
Loss	3–2	Allen Crowder	TKO (punches and elbows)	Dana White's Contender Series 8	August 29, 2017	3	4:12	Las Vegas, Nevada, United States	
Win	3–1	Demoreo Dennis	Decision (unanimous)	LFA 9	April 14, 2017	3	5:00	Shawnee, Oklahoma, United States	
Loss	2–1	Kenny Fredenburg	DQ (illegal elbow)	RFA 46	December 9, 2016	1	2:06	Branson, Missouri, United States	
Win	2–0	Arnold Adams	TKO (submission to punches)	Hoosier Fight Club 29	June 4, 2016	5	3:09	Hammond, Indiana, United States	Won the Hoosier FC Heavyweight Championship.
Win	1–0	Harry Hunsucker	TKO (submission to punches)	Hardrock MMA 77	February 6, 2016	1	2:12	Shepherdsville, Kentucky, United States	Heavyweight debut.

== See also ==
- List of male mixed martial artists
