= UFC Fight Night: Lewis vs. Daukaus =

UFC mixed martial arts event in 2021

- The poster for UFC Fight Night: Lewis vs. Daukaus
- Promotion: Ultimate Fighting Championship
- Date: December 18, 2021
- Venue: UFC Apex
- City: Enterprise, Nevada, United States
- Attendance: Not announced

Event chronology
UFC 269: Oliveira vs. Poirier	UFC Fight Night: Lewis vs. Daukaus	UFC on ESPN: Kattar vs. Chikadze

UFC Fight Night: Lewis vs. Daukaus (also known as UFC Fight Night 199, UFC on ESPN+ 57 and UFC Vegas 45) was a mixed martial arts event produced by the Ultimate Fighting Championship that took place on December 18, 2021 at the UFC Apex facility in Enterprise, Nevada, part of the Las Vegas Metropolitan Area, United States.

== Background ==
A heavyweight bout between former UFC Heavyweight Championship challenger Derrick Lewis and Chris Daukaus headlined the event.

A women's strawweight bout between Amanda Lemos and Nina Nunes was scheduled for the event. However, Nunes was removed from the bout due to undisclosed reasons and was replaced by former Invicta FC Strawweight Champion Angela Hill.

A middleweight bout between Anthony Hernandez and Dustin Stoltzfus was scheduled for the event. However, Hernandez withdrew from the event due to undisclosed reasons and was replaced by newcomer Caio Borralho. In turn, Borralho and Gerald Meerschaert's opponent, Abusupiyan Magomedov, were forced to withdraw from the fight due to visa issues, thus the UFC matched Meerschaert and Stoltzfus against each other for the event.

A women's bantamweight bout between former UFC Women's Bantamweight Championship challenger Raquel Pennington and Julia Avila was scheduled for the event. However, Avila was forced to pull out of the event due to injury. She was replaced by The Ultimate Fighter: Heavy Hitters featherweight winner Macy Chiasson, thus changing the contest to the weight class above.

A bantamweight bout between Raoni Barcelos and Trevin Jones was scheduled for the event. However, Jones withdrew from the fight due to undisclosed reasons and was replaced by Victor Henry. The pairing was then cancelled just hours before taking place due to COVID-19 protocols.

At the weigh-ins, three fighters missed weight for their respective bouts. Justin Tafa weighed in at 267 pounds, one pound over the heavyweight non-title fight limit (marking the first time in UFC history that a fighter missed weight in that division); Sijara Eubanks weighed in at 127.5 pounds, 1.5 pounds over the women's flyweight non-title fight limit; and Macy Chiasson weighed in at 148.5 pounds, 2.5 pounds over the women's featherweight non-title fight limit. All three bouts proceeded at a catchweight with Tafa, Eubanks and Chiasson each fined a percentage of their purses, which went to their opponents Harry Hunsucker, Melissa Gatto and Raquel Pennington respectively.

== Results ==
Main card (ESPN+)
Weight class				Method	Round	Time	Notes
Heavyweight	Derrick Lewis	def.	Chris Daukaus	KO (punches)	1	3:36
Welterweight	Belal Muhammad	def.	Stephen Thompson	Decision (unanimous) (30–25, 30–26, 30–26)	3	5:00
Women's Strawweight	Amanda Lemos	def.	Angela Hill	Decision (split) (28–29, 30–27, 29–28)	3	5:00
Bantamweight	Ricky Simón	def.	Raphael Assunção	KO (punches)	2	2:14
Lightweight	Mateusz Gamrot	def.	Carlos Diego Ferreira	TKO (submission to knee to the body)	2	3:26
Featherweight	Cub Swanson	def.	Darren Elkins	TKO (spinning wheel kick and punches)	1	2:12
Preliminary card (ESPN+)
Middleweight	Gerald Meerschaert	def.	Dustin Stoltzfus	Submission (rear-naked choke)	3	2:58
Catchweight (267 lb)	Justin Tafa	def.	Harry Hunsucker	KO (head kick)	1	1:53
Catchweight (127.5 lb)	Melissa Gatto	def.	Sijara Eubanks	TKO (body kick and punches)	3	0:45
Featherweight	Charles Jourdain	def.	Andre Ewell	Decision (unanimous) (30–26, 30–27, 29–27)	3	5:00
Catchweight (148.5 lb)	Raquel Pennington	def.	Macy Chiasson	Submission (guillotine choke)	2	3:07
Heavyweight	Don'Tale Mayes	def.	Josh Parisian	TKO (elbows)	3	3:26
Lightweight	Jordan Leavitt	def.	Matt Sayles	Submission (inverted triangle choke)	2	2:05

== Bonus awards ==
The following fighters received $50,000 bonuses.

- Fight of the Night: Amanda Lemos vs. Angela Hill
- Performance of the Night: Cub Swanson and Melissa Gatto

== See also ==
- List of UFC events
- List of current UFC fighters
- 2021 in UFC
