= Alan Baudot =

French mixed martial arts fighter (born 1988)

- Born: Alan Dimitri Baudot; 1 February 1988 (age 38); Lyon, France
- Other names: The Black Samourai
- Height: 6 ft 3 in (1.91 m)
- Weight: 256 lb (116 kg; 18.3 st)
- Division: Heavyweight
- Reach: 79 in (201 cm)
- Fighting out of: Paris, France
- Team: MMA Factory
- Years active: 2013–present

Mixed martial arts record
- Total: 14
- Wins: 9
- By knockout: 7
- By decision: 1
- By disqualification: 1
- Losses: 4
- By knockout: 3
- By decision: 1
- No contests: 1

Other information
- Mixed martial arts record from Sherdog

Alan Dimitri Baudot (born 1 February 1988) is a French mixed martial artist who competes in the Heavyweight division. He has previously fought in the Ultimate Fighting Championship.

== Background ==
Alan Baudot was born on the slopes of the Croix-Rousse in Lyon, in a modest environment, with his parents originally from Martinique, from the commune of Schœlcher. At the age of 12, his mother and stepfather decided to leave the city and move to the countryside, near Besançon, in Franche-Comté. Growing up amongst cows and farms, Baudot had a pleasant childhood, with Besançon being where he started judo, his first sensations in combat sports. At the same time, he played rugby in Fédérale 2 (4^{e} division) and tried his hand at fist-fighting. In love with martial arts, he turned to contact sports such as kick-boxing and muay-thai at the age of 19. As for his studies, Alan obtained a BEP (vocational diploma) and then a professional diploma in cooking and a CAP (vocational training certificate) in masonry. He accumulated jobs and never stopped working, for example, as assistant manager of a hotel, delivery driver or receptionist. Learning was also a constant for Baudot, as he holds a professional diploma from the Ministry of Youth, Popular Education and Sport (BPJEPS). Alan is also a coach specialized in pugilistic activities (boxing).

Passionate about Japanese culture, he took the lead and decided to go to Japan at the age of 22, with his friend Mathieu Muller. With his friend, they wanted to open a delicatessen in Tokyo to sell products from Franche-Comté. Arriving there with dreams, they had nothing set aside, had no training in international trade. Once there, the two friends were disappointed. Launching a business in Japan as an expatriate was a real obstacle course and the project of the two friends dreamers collapsed. It was there in 2013 that Baudot decided to let off steam by entering Hayato Sakurai's gym. Three months passed between his first steps in MMA and his first fight, however Baudot had to return to France because his visa had expired. Two weeks later, Hayato Sakurai paid for Baudot's plane ticket to come back to Japan for the bout, which he won and earned 600 euros. Since MMA does not allow him to live, the Frenchman works as a bouncer in the bustling Roppongi district of Tokyo while also doing some kick-boxing and muay-thai fights, leading him to nicknamed "The Black Samurai".

== Mixed martial arts career ==
=== Early career ===
After a seven-month break, back in France, during the 2016/2017 season, the Martinique native was offered to join the "MMA Factory" stable. Fernand Lopez the former coach of the MMA World Champion Francis Ngannou and current coach of the Guadeloupean Ciryl Gane, takes him in hand. "I train with them and then Fernand Lopez, who is looking for trainers and loves excellence, asks me to find out more so that I can get a diploma. That's how I got my Brevet professionnel de la Jeunesse, de l'Education populaire et du Sport (BPJEPS), specializing in pugilistic activities", he confides.

Baudot faced Todd Stoute at TKO 47: Jourdain vs. Lapilus on April 11, 2019. After losing the bout by rear-naked choke in the third round, the bout was later overturned to a DQ win for Baudot after Stoute tested positive for 100 nanograms of THC.

=== Ultimate Fighting Championship ===
Baudot, as a short notice replacement for Sergey Spivak, faced Tom Aspinall at UFC Fight Night: Moraes vs. Sandhagen on October 11, 2020. Baudot lost the fight via first-round technical knockout.

Baudot was scheduled to face Rodrigo Nascimento on May 22, 2021, at UFC Fight Night: Font vs. Garbrandt. However, after Baudot was injured, the bout was moved to UFC on ESPN: Makhachev vs. Moisés held on July 17, 2021. Baudot lost the fight via technical knockout in round two. However, Nascimento's urine test from the fight tested positive for ritalinic acid, a metabolite of psychostimulant drugs methylphenidate and ethylphenidate. As a result, the bout was also overturned to a no contest.

Baudot faced Parker Porter on February 19, 2022, at UFC Fight Night: Walker vs. Hill. He lost the fight via unanimous decision.

Baudot faced Josh Parisian on June 25, 2022, at UFC on ESPN 38. Despite winning the first round against Parisian, Baudot lost the fight via technical knockout in the second round.

In July 2022, it was announced that Baudot was no longer on the UFC roster.

== Championships and accomplishments ==
- HEAT
  - HEAT Light Heavyweight Championship (One time)
    - One successful title defense

== Mixed martial arts record ==
Professional record breakdown
14 matches	9 wins	4 losses
By knockout	7	3
By decision	1	1
By disqualification	1	0
No contests	1	

Res.	Record	Opponent	Method	Event	Date	Round	Time	Location	Notes
Win	9–4 (1)	Mamadou Lamine Sene	Decision (split)	Hexagone MMA Series 5	September 12, 2026	3	5:00	Le Grand-Quevilly, France	
Loss	8–4 (1)	Josh Parisian	TKO (punches)	UFC on ESPN: Tsarukyan vs. Gamrot	June 25, 2022	2	3:04	Las Vegas, Nevada, United States	
Loss	8–3 (1)	Parker Porter	Decision (unanimous)	UFC Fight Night: Walker vs. Hill	February 19, 2022	3	5:00	Las Vegas, Nevada, United States	
NC	8–2 (1)	Rodrigo Nascimento	NC (overturned)	UFC on ESPN: Makhachev vs. Moisés	July 17, 2021	2	1:29	Las Vegas, Nevada, United States	Originally a TKO (punches) win for Nascimento; overturned after he tested positive for ritalinic acid.
Loss	8–2	Tom Aspinall	TKO (elbows and punches)	UFC Fight Night: Moraes vs. Sandhagen	October 10, 2020	1	1:35	Abu Dhabi, United Arab Emirates	Return to Heavyweight.
Win	8–1	Todd Stoute	DQ (overturned by promoter)	TKO 47: Jourdain vs. Lapilus	April 11, 2019	3	3:54	Montreal, Canada	Originally a submission (rear-naked choke) win for Stoute; overturned after he tested positive for marijuana.
Win	7–1	Yuto Nakajima	TKO (punches)	Mach Matsuri 2018	May 6, 2018	1	4:16	Tokyo, Japan	Heavyweight bout.
Loss	6–1	Dalcha Lungiambula	KO (punch)	EFC Worldwide 61	July 8, 2017	1	0:26	North West Province, South Africa	For the EFC Light Heavyweight Championship.
Win	6–0	Yusuke Masuda	KO (punches)	HEAT 39	February 19, 2017	2	3:23	Nagoya, Japan	Defended the HEAT Light Heavyweight Championship.
Win	5–0	Chul Yeon Jung	TKO (punches)	Angel's Fighting 1	October 8, 2016	1	N/A	Seoul, South Korea	Heavyweight bout.
Win	4–0	Dong Xing Wu	TKO (punches)	Grandslam MMA 4	March 19, 2016	1	1:16	Tokyo, Japan	
Win	3–0	Shunsuke Inoue	TKO (punches)	HEAT 36	November 29, 2015	5	0:22	Nagoya, Japan	Light Heavyweight debut. Won the HEAT Light Heavyweight Championship.
Win	2–0	Yuji Sakuragi	TKO (punches)	Grandslam MMA 3	September 12, 2015	1	2:35	Tokyo, Japan	Openweight bout.
Win	1–0	Akira Iezaki	TKO (punches)	GRACHAN 10	July 15, 2013	1	2:09	Tokyo, Japan	Heavyweight debut.

== See also ==
- List of male mixed martial artists
