= UFC on ESPN: Makhachev vs. Moisés =

Mixed martial arts event in 2021

- The poster for UFC on ESPN: Makhachev vs. Moisés
- Promotion: Ultimate Fighting Championship
- Date: July 17, 2021
- Venue: UFC Apex
- City: Enterprise, Nevada
- Attendance: None (behind closed doors)

Event chronology
UFC 264: Poirier vs. McGregor 3	UFC on ESPN: Makhachev vs. Moisés	UFC on ESPN: Sandhagen vs. Dillashaw

UFC on ESPN: Makhachev vs. Moisés (also known as UFC on ESPN 26 and UFC Vegas 31) was a mixed martial arts event produced by the Ultimate Fighting Championship that took place on July 17, 2021, at the UFC Apex facility in Enterprise, Nevada, part of the Las Vegas Metropolitan Area, United States.

== Background ==
A featherweight bout between former UFC Featherweight Champion Max Holloway and The Ultimate Fighter: Latin America featherweight winner Yair Rodríguez was slated to serve as the event headliner. However, Holloway was pulled from the bout due to injury. Subsequently, a lightweight bout between Islam Makhachev and Thiago Moisés was then promoted to serve as the new main event.

A women's bantamweight bout between former Strikeforce and UFC Women's Bantamweight Champion Miesha Tate and Marion Reneau took place at this event. It was Tate's first fight since UFC 205, where she lost to former title challenger Raquel Pennington via unanimous decision and decided to retire afterwards.

Guram Kutateladze and Don Madge were expected to meet in a lightweight bout at UFC Fight Night: Edwards vs. Muhammad four months earlier, but Kutateladze pulled out due to a knee injury that required surgery. They were then rescheduled for this event. However, the bout was scrapped after Kutateladze once again withdrew from the bout citing injury and visa issues.

A heavyweight bout between Rodrigo Nascimento and Alan Baudot was originally expected to take place at UFC Fight Night: Font vs. Garbrandt. However, they were rescheduled to this event after Baudot got injured.

Herbert Burns and Billy Quarantillo were expected to meet in a featherweight bout at this event. Burns eventually pulled out in early June due to a torn ACL and was replaced by Gabriel Benítez.

A flyweight bout between Ode Osbourne and Amir Albazi was originally linked to the event. However, Albazi pulled out of the fight in late June citing injury. In turn, Osbourne was pulled from the card entirely and rescheduled for a future event.

A middleweight bout between Phil Hawes and Deron Winn was scheduled to take place at the event. However, Winn was forced to pull out from the event citing a separated rib and torn cartilage. The pairing remained intact and was rescheduled for October at UFC Fight Night 194.

Abubakar Nurmagomedov was scheduled to meet Daniel Rodriguez in a welterweight bout. However, Nurmagomedov was forced to withdraw from the event citing injury. Rodriguez faced promotional newcomer Preston Parsons instead.

A bantamweight bout between Miles Johns and Anderson dos Santos was scheduled for the preliminary card. However, the bout was removed just hours before taking place due to COVID-19 protocol issues in Dos Santos' camp.

== Results ==
Main card (ESPN / ESPN+)
Weight class				Method	Round	Time	Notes
Lightweight	Islam Makhachev	def.	Thiago Moisés	Submission (rear-naked choke)	4	2:38
Women's Bantamweight	Miesha Tate	def.	Marion Reneau	TKO (punches)	3	1:53
Lightweight	Mateusz Gamrot	def.	Jeremy Stephens	Submission (kimura)	1	1:05
Middleweight	Rodolfo Vieira	def.	Dustin Stoltzfus	Submission (rear-naked choke)	3	1:54
Featherweight	Billy Quarantillo	def.	Gabriel Benítez	TKO (punches)	3	3:40
Preliminary card (ESPN / ESPN+)
Welterweight	Daniel Rodriguez	def.	Preston Parsons	TKO (punches)	1	3:47
Women's Strawweight	Amanda Lemos	def.	Montserrat Ruiz	TKO (punches)	1	0:35
Bantamweight	Sergey Morozov	def.	Khalid Taha	Decision (unanimous) (30–27, 30–27, 30–27)	3	5:00
Flyweight	Malcolm Gordon	def.	Francisco Figueiredo	Decision (unanimous) (30–27, 29–28, 29–28)	3	5:00
Heavyweight	Rodrigo Nascimento	vs.	Alan Baudot	No Contest (overturned)	2	1:29	(Note: Originally a TKO (punches) win for Nascimento; overturned after he tested positive for ritalinic acid.)

== Bonus awards ==
The following fighters received $50,000 bonuses.

- Fight of the Night: Billy Quarantillo vs. Gabriel Benítez
- Performance of the Night: Miesha Tate, Mateusz Gamrot, Rodolfo Vieira, and Rodrigo Nascimento

== Aftermath ==
On September 22, it was announced that by the Nevada Athletic Commission (NAC) that Rodrigo Nascimento tested positive for ritalinic acid, therefore he received a six-month suspension, retroactive to the test. He was also fined a total of $1,945.36, for the violation and subsequent legal fees. His victory was overturned to a no contest. In late August 2022, it was announced that Nascimento received a therapeutic use exemption (TUE) after proving use of the medication for the treatment of a legitimate medical condition. Since the Nevada commission doesn't accept retroactive TUEs, Nascimento would have to appeal to a higher court to achieve a reinstation of his original result. The three-year TUE went effective on Nov. 12 and is valid for tests conducted by USADA and NAC. He still must require prior approval from other athletic commissions if he’s scheduled to compete outside of Nevada.

== See also ==
- List of UFC events
- List of current UFC fighters
- 2021 in UFC
