= Tagir Ulanbekov =

Russian mixed martial artist (born 1991)

Тagir Ulanbekov
- Born: Tagir Radzhabovich Ulanbekov; July 8, 1991 (age 35); Dylym, Dagestan ASSR, Russian SFSR, Soviet Union
- Native name: Тагир Уланбеков
- Nationality: Russian
- Height: 5 ft 7 in (1.70 m)
- Weight: 125 lb (57 kg; 8 st 13 lb)
- Division: Flyweight
- Reach: 70 in (178 cm)
- Style: Sambo
- Fighting out of: Makhachkala, Dagestan, Russia
- Team: American Kickboxing Academy; Eagles MMA; SC Bazarganova
- Years active: 2013–present

Mixed martial arts record
- Total: 20
- Wins: 17
- By knockout: 1
- By submission: 8
- By decision: 8
- Losses: 3
- By submission: 1
- By decision: 2

Other information
- Mixed martial arts record from Sherdog

Tagir Radzhabovich Ulanbekov (Russian: Тагир Раджабович Уланбеков; born July 8, 1991) is a Russian professional mixed martial artist who competes in the Flyweight division of the Ultimate Fighting Championship (UFC). He is also the former Fight Nights Global Flyweight Champion. Ulanbekov is a one-time world champion, one-time Eurasian champion and one-time European cup winner in combat sambo for his team, SC Bazarganova.

== Background ==
Tagir Ulanbekov was born to an Avar family on July 8, 1991, in the village of Dylym in the Kazbekovsky District of the Republic of Dagestan.

As a child, Ulanbekov began wrestling after his uncle took him to a wrestling section named after Saypulla Absaidov. When Ulanbekov was 8 years old, he moved to Makhachkala, Dagestan. In Makhachkala, he joined the ranks of Eagles MMA and was coached by Abdulmanap Nurmagomedov. There, he trained alongside fighters such as former UFC Lightweight Champion Khabib Nurmagomedov and current UFC Welterweight Champion Islam Makhachev.

Growing up, Tagir worked in the bazaar, helping his mother.

== Mixed martial arts career ==
=== Early career ===
Ulanbekov won his first career victory over Magomednur Aglarov at the "Liga Kavkaz - Grand Umakhan Battle" tournament. He would go on to win 7 bouts in a row, and won the Fight Night Global Flyweight title, where he submitted Artan Asatryan in the fourth round via guillotine choke at Fight Nights Global 76. Ulanbekov would face defeat for the first time in his career against fellow future UFC fighter Zhalgas Zhumagulov at Fight Nights Global 88, losing the close bout by majority decision. He would then compete under the banner of Gorilla Fighting Championship (Now Eagle FC), where he went 3-0 and captured the GF Flyweight Championship.

=== Ultimate Fighting Championship ===
Ulanbekov was scheduled to face Bruno Gustavo da Silva on September 12, 2020, at UFC Fight Night: Waterson vs. Hill. However, due to travel restrictions related to the COVID-19 pandemic, the pairing was rescheduled and took place four weeks later at UFC Fight Night: Moraes vs. Sandhagen. Ulanbekov won the fight via unanimous decision.

Ulanbekov was scheduled to face Matheus Nicolau on January 24, 2021, at UFC 257. However, Ulanbekov withdrew due to undisclosed reasons. The pairing was eventually rescheduled for UFC Fight Night 187. However, Ulanbekov withdrew from the bout the second time for undisclosed reasons and was replaced by Manel Kape.

Ulanbekov was scheduled to face Tyson Nam on June 19, 2021, at UFC on ESPN 25. However, the bout was never officially announced by the promotion and the matchup did not take place on the card due to an undisclosed illness for Ulanbekov.

Ulanbekov faced Allan Nascimento on October 30, 2021, at UFC 267. He won the fight via split decision.

Ulanbekov faced Tim Elliott on March 5, 2022, at UFC 272. He lost the fight via unanimous decision. 12 out of 17 media scores gave it to Ulanbekov.

Ulanbekov was scheduled to face Tyson Nam on June 25, 2022, at UFC on ESPN 38 but pulled out due to undisclosed injury.

Ulanbekov faced Nate Maness on November 5, 2022, at UFC Fight Night 214. He won the fight via a guillotine choke submission in the first round.

Ulanbekov faced Cody Durden on December 16, 2023, at UFC 296. He won the fight via a face crank submission in the second round.

Ulanbekov was scheduled to face Alex Perez on June 15, 2024, at UFC on ESPN 58. However, the bout was changed and Ulanbekov ended up being scheduled to face Joshua Van at that event instead. In turn, the bout against Van was cancelled when Ulanbekov weighed in at 129.5 pounds, three and a half pounds over the flyweight non-title fight limit.

Ulanbekov faced undefeated prospect Clayton Carpenter on January 18, 2025, at UFC 311. He won the fight by unanimous decision.

Ulanbekov was scheduled to face former UFC Flyweight Championship challenger, RIZIN Flyweight and two-time RIZIN Bantamweight Champion (also former Bellator Bantamweight World Champion) Kyoji Horiguchi on June 21, 2025, at UFC on ABC 8. However, Horiguchi withdrew from the bout for unknown reasons and was replaced by Azat Maksum. Ulanbekov won the fight by unanimous decision. The bout was re-scheduled and took place on November 22, 2025, at UFC Fight Night 265. Ulanbekov lost the fight via a rear-naked choke submission in the third round.

== Professional grappling career ==
Ulanbekov competed against Jussier Formiga in the co-main event of ADXC 6 on October 25, 2024. He lost the match by unanimous decision.

== Championships and accomplishments ==
=== Mixed martial arts ===
- Fight Night Global
  - Fight Night Global Flyweight Championship (One time)
- Gorilla Fighting Championship (Now Eagle FC)
  - GF Flyweight Championship (One time)
    - Two successful title defences

=== Sambo ===
- Russian Combat Sambo Federation (RCSF)
  - (gold) Russian Professional Combat Sambo Championship-Samara, Russia (2014) at 57 kg
- European Combat Sambo Federation (ECSF)
  - (bronze) European Combat Sambo Championship-Kishinev, Moldova (2012) at 57 kg
  - (gold) European Cup in Combat Sambo among Clubs-Yalta, Crimea (2012) at 57 kg representing SC Bazarganova
  - (gold) Combat Sambo Eurasia Championship-Yalta, Crimea (2014) at 57 kg
- World Combat Sambo Federation (WCSF)
  - (gold) World Combat Sambo Championship-Moscow, Russia (2014) at 57 kg

== Mixed martial arts record ==
Professional record breakdown
| 20 matches | 17 wins | 3 losses |
| By knockout | 1 | 0 |
| By submission | 8 | 1 |
| By decision | 8 | 2 |

| Res. | Record | Opponent | Method | Event | Date | Round | Time | Location | Notes |
|---|---|---|---|---|---|---|---|---|---|
| Loss | 17–3 | Kyoji Horiguchi | Technical Submission (rear-naked choke) | UFC Fight Night: Tsarukyan vs. Hooker | November 22, 2025 | 3 | 2:18 | Al Rayyan, Qatar | |
| Win | 17–2 | Azat Maksum | Decision (unanimous) | UFC on ABC: Hill vs. Rountree Jr. | June 21, 2025 | 3 | 5:00 | Baku, Azerbaijan | |
| Win | 16–2 | Clayton Carpenter | Decision (unanimous) | UFC 311 | January 18, 2025 | 3 | 5:00 | Inglewood, California, United States | |
| Win | 15–2 | Cody Durden | Submission (face crank) | UFC 296 | December 16, 2023 | 2 | 4:25 | Las Vegas, Nevada, United States | |
| Win | 14–2 | Nate Maness | Submission (guillotine choke) | UFC Fight Night: Rodriguez vs. Lemos | November 5, 2022 | 1 | 2:11 | Las Vegas, Nevada, United States | |
| Loss | 13–2 | Tim Elliott | Decision (unanimous) | UFC 272 | March 5, 2022 | 3 | 5:00 | Las Vegas, Nevada, United States | |
| Win | 13–1 | Allan Nascimento | Decision (split) | UFC 267 | October 30, 2021 | 3 | 5:00 | Abu Dhabi, United Arab Emirates | |
| Win | 12–1 | Bruno Gustavo da Silva | Decision (unanimous) | UFC Fight Night: Moraes vs. Sandhagen | October 11, 2020 | 3 | 5:00 | Abu Dhabi, United Arab Emirates | |
| Win | 11–1 | Denilson Matos | Submission (guillotine choke) | Gorilla Fighting 22 | December 13, 2019 | 2 | 1:18 | Krasnodar, Russia | Defended the GF Flyweight Championship. |
| Win | 10–1 | Denis Araujo | Submission (rear-naked choke) | Gorilla Fighting 17 | September 27, 2019 | 2 | 3:19 | Atyrau, Kazakhstan | Defended the GF Flyweight Championship. |
| Win | 9–1 | Aleksandr Podlesniy | Decision (unanimous) | Gorilla Fighting 11 | May 3, 2019 | 3 | 5:00 | Penza, Russia | Won the GF Flyweight Championship. |
| Loss | 8–1 | Zhalgas Zhumagulov | Decision (majority) | Fight Nights Global 88 | August 31, 2018 | 3 | 5:00 | Astana, Kazakhstan | Lost the FNG Flyweight Championship. |
| Win | 8–0 | Vartan Asatryan | Submission (guillotine choke) | Fight Nights Global 76 | October 8, 2017 | 4 | 1:39 | Krasnodar, Russia | Won the FNG Flyweight Championship. |
| Win | 7–0 | Shajidul Haque | Decision (unanimous) | Fight Nights Global 65 | May 19, 2017 | 3 | 5:00 | Astana, Kazakhstan | Bantamweight bout. |
| Win | 6–0 | Asu Almabayev | TKO (submission to punches) | Fight Nights Global 58 | January 28, 2017 | 3 | 4:51 | Kaspiysk, Russia | Flyweight debut. |
| Win | 5–0 | Shyngys Kairanov | Decision (unanimous) | Fight Nights Global 54 | November 16, 2016 | 3 | 5:00 | Rostov-on-Don, Russia | Catchweight (130 lb) bout. |
| Win | 4–0 | Alexander Nesterov | Submission (rear-naked choke) | PRIDE Fighting Show: The Stars of World MMA | April 23, 2016 | 1 | 2:18 | Nizhny Novgorod, Russia | |
| Win | 3–0 | Ivan Andrushchenko | Decision (majority) | Fight Star: Battle on the Volga | May 30, 2015 | 2 | 5:00 | Saratov, Russia | |
| Win | 2–0 | Nurtilek Yerkuatuly | Submission (armbar) | Liga Kavkaz: Battle in Babayurt | February 1, 2015 | 1 | 2:48 | Dagestan, Russia | |
| Win | 1–0 | Magomednur Aglarov | Submission (armbar) | Liga Kavkaz: Grand Umakhan Battle | July 7, 2013 | 1 | 4:50 | Khunzakh, Russia | Bantamweight debut. |

== See also ==
- List of current UFC fighters
- List of male mixed martial artists
