= Joaquin Buckley =

American mixed martial artist (born 1994)

- Born: Joaquin Yuconri Buckley; April 27, 1994 (age 32); St. Louis, Missouri, U.S.
- Other names: New Mansa
- Height: 5 ft 10 in (178 cm)
- Weight: 170 lb (77 kg; 12 st 2 lb)
- Division: Welterweight (2014–2018, 2023–present); Middleweight (2019–2022)
- Reach: 76 in (193 cm)
- Fighting out of: St. Louis, Missouri, U.S.
- Team: Finney's MMA (2012–present); Murcielago MMA (2020–present)
- Years active: 2014–2026

Mixed martial arts record
- Total: 30
- Wins: 21
- By knockout: 15
- By decision: 6
- Losses: 9
- By knockout: 5
- By decision: 4

Other information
- Mixed martial arts record from Sherdog

Joaquin Yuconri Buckley (/hwɑːˈkiːn/ whah-KEEN; born April 27, 1994) is an American professional mixed martial artist. He currently competes in the welterweight division of the Ultimate Fighting Championship (UFC). A professional since 2014, he has also formerly competed for Bellator MMA and Legacy Fighting Alliance. As of November 14, 2026, he is #13 in the Meta UFC welterweight rankings.

== Background ==
Buckley was born and raised in St. Louis, Missouri. Buckley and his mother lived in his grandmother's house for the most part of his youth. Buckley's mother died due to a heart condition when he was in the sixth grade. He started wrestling at Marquette High School, growing interested in mixed martial arts, and eventually started training in it after graduating.

== Mixed martial arts career ==
=== Early career ===
Starting his professional career in 2014, Buckley compiled a 10–2 record fighting for Shamrock FC, Bellator MMA, and Legacy Fighting Alliance. During that time, he most notably faced Logan Storley on April 13, 2018, at Bellator 197. He lost the fight by unanimous decision. After two straight TKO wins in LFA, Buckley was signed to the UFC.

=== Ultimate Fighting Championship ===
Buckley made his UFC debut against Kevin Holland on August 8, 2020, at UFC Fight Night 174, just one week after picking up a win in LFA. He lost the fight via technical knockout in round three.

A middleweight bout between Abu Azaitar and Joaquin Buckley was expected to take place on October 11, 2020, at UFC Fight Night 179. However, Azaitar pulled out on September 26 due to undisclosed reasons and was replaced by Impa Kasanganay. Buckley won the bout via knockout in the second round in spectacular fashion. Kasanganay grabbed his foot after Buckley threw a left body kick. Buckley then jumped off the trapped leg and connected a spinning back kick to the head, knocking Kasanganay out cold. For this knockout, Buckley not only earned the Performance of the Night bonus, but the video of his knockout win went viral on the internet. The UFC tweet with the video was the most-liked (359,000), most-retweeted (143,000), and most-viewed (12.8 million) tweet in UFC history. The knockout became the UFC's most-watched Instagram video ever with over 17.8 million views. Across three tweets, three Instagram posts, four Facebook posts, and a TikTok video, the Buckley knockout video has generated more than 65 million views and 83 million impressions for the UFC. Rapper Kanye West even used the footage of the knockout to promote the release of a new song.

In a quick return to the Octagon, Buckley faced Jordan Wright at UFC 255 on November 21, 2020. He won the fight via knockout in round two. This win earned him the Performance of the Night award.

Buckley faced Alessio Di Chirico on January 16, 2021, at UFC on ABC 1. He lost the fight in the first round via a head kick knockout.

Buckley faced Antônio Arroyo on September 18, 2021, at UFC Fight Night 192. He won the fight via knockout in round three. This win earned him the Performance of the Night award.

Buckley was scheduled to face Abdul Razak Alhassan on January 15, 2022, at UFC on ESPN 32. However, the pairing was cancelled after Alhassan withdrew for undisclosed reasons and the pair was rescheduled to UFC Fight Night 201. Buckley won the fight via split decision. Of the 16 media pundits scoring the fight, 7 scored it in favor of Buckley, 8 scored in favor of Alhassan, and 1 scored it a draw.

Buckley was scheduled to face Abusupiyan Magomedov on June 4, 2022, at UFC Fight Night 207. However, the bout was cancelled for unknown reasons.

Buckley faced Albert Duraev on June 18, 2022, at UFC on ESPN 37. He won the fight via TKO before the third round after the ringside doctor stopped the fight due to Duraev's eye swelling shut. This win earned him his fourth Performance of the Night award.

Buckley faced Nassourdine Imavov on September 3, 2022, at UFC Fight Night 209. He lost the fight via unanimous decision.

Buckley faced Chris Curtis on December 10, 2022, at UFC 282. He lost the fight via technical knockout in round two.

Buckley faced André Fialho on May 20, 2023, at UFC Fight Night 223. He won the fight via technical knockout in round two.

Buckley faced Alex Morono on October 7, 2023, at UFC Fight Night 229. He won the fight via unanimous decision.

Buckley faced Vicente Luque on March 30, 2024, at UFC on ESPN 54, as a replacement for an injured Sean Brady. He won the fight via technical knockout in round two.

Buckley faced Nursulton Ruziboev on May 11, 2024, at UFC on ESPN 56. He won the fight by unanimous decision.

Buckley faced former UFC Welterweight Championship title challenger Stephen Thompson on October 5, 2024 at UFC 307. He won the fight by knockout in the third round. This fight earned him another Performance of the Night award.

Buckley was scheduled to face Ian Machado Garry on December 14, 2024, at UFC on ESPN 63. However, Garry was pulled to fight Shavkat Rakhmonov at UFC 310 and was replaced by former interim champion Colby Covington. Buckley won the fight by technical knockout as a result of a doctor stoppage due to a cut above Covington's eye in the third round.

Buckley faced former UFC Welterweight Champion Kamaru Usman in the main event on June 14, 2025, at UFC on ESPN 69. He lost the fight by unanimous decision. This fight earned him a Fight of the Night award.

Buckley was scheduled to face Sean Brady on April 25, 2026 in the main event at UFC Fight Night 274. However, the bout was moved to UFC 328 on May 9, 2026 for undisclosed reasons. Buckley lost the fight by unanimous decision.

Buckley faced Mike Malott in the main event on October 17, 2026 at UFC Fight Night 291. He lost the fight by knockout in the second round.

== Freestyle wrestling career ==
Buckley made his debut for Real American Freestyle at RAF 03 on November 29, 2025, losing to Pat Downey.

He faced Tyron Woodley at RAF 12 on August 22, 2026. He lost the bout by decision. This fight earned him Match of the Night award.

== Championships and accomplishments ==
=== Mixed Martial Arts ===
- Ultimate Fighting Championship
  - Fight of the Night (One time) vs. Kamaru Usman
  - Performance of the Night (Five times) vs. Impa Kasanganay, Jordan Wright, Albert Duraev, Antônio Arroyo and Stephen Thompson
  - UFC Honors Awards
    - 2020: President's Choice Performance of the Year Winner vs. Impa Kasanganay & Fan's Choice Knockout of the Year Winner vs. Impa Kasanganay
  - UFC.com Awards
    - 2020: Knockout of the Year vs. Impa Kasanganay & Ranked #2 Newcomer of the Year
    - 2024: Ranked #9 Fighter of the Year
- Combat Press
  - 2024 Breakout Fighter of the Year
- MMA Junkie
  - 2020 October Knockout of the Month vs. Impa Kasanganay
  - 2024 Breakout Fighter of the Year
- MMA Fighting
  - 2024 Second Team MMA All-Star
- MMA Mania
  - 2024 #4 Ranked Fighter of the Year
- MMA Fighting, Bleacher Report, MMA Mania, MMA Junkie, Combat Press, Cageside Press, BT Sport, Sherdog, MMA Weekly, MMA Sucka, Bloody Elbow, CBS Sports, ESPN
  - 2020 Knockout of the Year vs. Impa Kasanganay
- World MMA Awards
  - 2021 Knockout of the Year vs. Impa Kasanganay at UFC Fight Night: Moraes vs. Sandhagen

Voting period for 2021 awards ran through July 2020 to July 2021 due to the COVID-19 pandemic.

=== Freestyle wrestling ===
- Real American Freestyle
  - Match of the Night (One time) vs. Tyron Woodley

== Mixed martial arts record ==
Professional record breakdown
30 matches	21 wins	9 losses
By knockout	15	5
By decision	6	4

Res.	Record	Opponent	Method	Event	Date	Round	Time	Location	Notes
Loss	21–9	Mike Malott	KO (knee and punch)	UFC Fight Night: Buckley vs. Malott	October 17, 2026	2	2:32	Edmonton, Alberta, Canada	
Loss	21–8	Sean Brady	Decision (unanimous)	UFC 328	May 9, 2026	3	5:00	Newark, New Jersey, United States	
Loss	21–7	Kamaru Usman	Decision (unanimous)	UFC on ESPN: Usman vs. Buckley	June 14, 2025	5	5:00	Atlanta, Georgia, United States	Fight of the Night.
Win	21–6	Colby Covington	TKO (doctor stoppage)	UFC on ESPN: Covington vs. Buckley	December 14, 2024	3	4:42	Tampa, Florida, United States	
Win	20–6	Stephen Thompson	KO (punch)	UFC 307	October 5, 2024	3	2:17	Salt Lake City, Utah, United States	Performance of the Night.
Win	19–6	Nursulton Ruziboev	Decision (unanimous)	UFC on ESPN: Lewis vs. Nascimento	May 11, 2024	3	5:00	St. Louis, Missouri, United States	
Win	18–6	Vicente Luque	TKO (punches)	UFC on ESPN: Blanchfield vs. Fiorot	March 30, 2024	2	3:17	Atlantic City, New Jersey, United States	
Win	17–6	Alex Morono	Decision (unanimous)	UFC Fight Night: Dawson vs. Green	October 7, 2023	3	5:00	Las Vegas, Nevada, United States	
Win	16–6	André Fialho	TKO (head kick)	UFC Fight Night: Dern vs. Hill	May 20, 2023	2	4:15	Las Vegas, Nevada, United States	Return to Welterweight.
Loss	15–6	Chris Curtis	KO (punches)	UFC 282	December 10, 2022	2	2:49	Las Vegas, Nevada, United States	
Loss	15–5	Nassourdine Imavov	Decision (unanimous)	UFC Fight Night: Gane vs. Tuivasa	September 3, 2022	3	5:00	Paris, France	
Win	15–4	Albert Duraev	TKO (doctor stoppage)	UFC on ESPN: Kattar vs. Emmett	June 18, 2022	2	5:00	Austin, Texas, United States	Performance of the Night.
Win	14–4	Abdul Razak Alhassan	Decision (split)	UFC Fight Night: Walker vs. Hill	February 19, 2022	3	5:00	Las Vegas, Nevada, United States	
Win	13–4	Antônio Arroyo	KO (punches)	UFC Fight Night: Smith vs. Spann	September 18, 2021	3	2:26	Las Vegas, Nevada, United States	Performance of the Night.
Loss	12–4	Alessio Di Chirico	KO (head kick)	UFC on ABC: Holloway vs. Kattar	January 16, 2021	1	2:12	Abu Dhabi, United Arab Emirates	
Win	12–3	Jordan Wright	KO (punches)	UFC 255	November 21, 2020	2	0:18	Las Vegas, Nevada, United States	Performance of the Night.
Win	11–3	Impa Kasanganay	KO (spinning back kick)	UFC Fight Night: Moraes vs. Sandhagen	October 11, 2020	2	2:03	Abu Dhabi, United Arab Emirates	Performance of the Night.
Loss	10–3	Kevin Holland	TKO (punch)	UFC Fight Night: Lewis vs. Oleinik	August 8, 2020	3	0:32	Las Vegas, Nevada, United States	
Win	10–2	Jackie Gosh	TKO (punches)	LFA 87	July 31, 2020	2	1:47	Sioux Falls, South Dakota, United States	
Win	9–2	Chris Harris	TKO (punches)	LFA 76	September 13, 2019	1	1:08	Park City, Kansas, United States	Middleweight debut.
Loss	8–2	Logan Storley	Decision (unanimous)	Bellator 197	April 13, 2018	3	5:00	St. Charles, Missouri, United States	
Win	8–1	Vinicius de Jesus	Decision (split)	Bellator 185	October 20, 2017	3	5:00	Uncasville, Connecticut, United States	
Win	7–1	Justin Patterson	Decision (unanimous)	Bellator 175	March 31, 2017	3	5:00	Rosemont, Illinois, United States	
Loss	6–1	Jackie Gosh	TKO (punches)	Bellator 164	November 10, 2016	1	2:44	Tel Aviv, Israel	
Win	6–0	Chris Heatherly	KO (knee)	Bellator 157: Dynamite 2	June 24, 2016	2	4:14	St. Louis, Missouri, United States	Catchweight (180 lb) bout.
Win	5–0	Kyle Kurtz	TKO (knee and punches)	Shamrock FC: Fuel	September 11, 2015	1	4:34	St. Louis, Missouri, United States	
Win	4–0	Stacy Bacon	Decision (unanimous)	Shamrock FC: Throwdown	July 25, 2015	3	5:00	St. Louis, Missouri, United States	
Win	3–0	Kalel Robinson	TKO (punches)	Shamrock FC: Showdown	March 21, 2015	3	4:01	St. Louis, Missouri, United States	
Win	2–0	Bryant West	TKO (punches)	Shamrock FC: Xtreme Fight Night 2	February 21, 2015	1	2:28	St. Louis, Missouri, United States	
Win	1–0	Wesley Sullivan	TKO (punches)	Shamrock FC: Nemesis	September 13, 2014	1	3:46	St. Louis, Missouri, United States	

== See also ==
- List of current UFC fighters
- List of male mixed martial artists
