= Dana White's Contender Series season 4 =

UFC mixed martial arts event in 2020

Dana White's Contender Series
- Season 4

Release
- Original network: ESPN+
- Original release: August 4 – November 17, 2020

Season chronology
- ← Previous; Season 3 Next → Season 5

In June 2020 it was confirmed that season 4 of Dana White's Contender Series would commence in August 2020 and in the US would be exclusive to ESPN+, ESPN's new over-the-top subscription package. In April 2020, the schedule was elaborated, the series beginning on August 4, 2020 and ending on September 1, 2020.

== Week 1 - August 4 ==
Dana White's Contender Series 27
- Promotion: DWCS
- Date: August 4, 2020
- Venue: UFC Apex Centre
- City: Las Vegas, Nevada, United States

Main Card
Weight class				Method	Round	Time	Notes
Light Heavyweight	Dustin Jacoby	def.	Ty Flores	Decision (unanimous) (30–26, 29–27, 29–27)	3	5:00
Lightweight	Uroš Medić	def.	Mikey Gonzalez	TKO (punches)	1	2:48
Flyweight	Jerome Rivera	def.	Ronaldo Rodríguez	Decision (unanimous) (29–28, 30–27, 30–27)	3	5:00
Lightweight	Jordan Leavitt	def.	Jose Flores	Submission (arm-triangle choke)	1	4:15

=== Contract awards ===
The following fighters were awarded contracts with the UFC:

- Dustin Jacoby, Uroš Medić, and Jordan Leavitt

== Week 2 - August 11 ==
Dana White's Contender Series 28
- Promotion: DWCS
- Date: August 11, 2020
- Venue: UFC Apex Centre
- City: Las Vegas, Nevada, United States

Main Card
Weight class				Method	Round	Time	Notes
Middleweight	Dustin Stoltzfus	def.	Joe Pyfer	TKO (arm injury)	1	4:21
Bantamweight	Adrian Yañez	def.	Brady Huang	TKO (punches)	1	0:39
Women's Strawweight	Cory McKenna	def.	Vanessa Demopoulos	Decision (unanimous) (30–27, 29–28, 29–28)	3	5:00
Featherweight	T.J. Laramie	def.	Daniel Swain	TKO (doctor stoppage)	1	5:00
Middleweight	Impa Kasanganay	def.	Anthony Adams	Decision (unanimous) (29–27, 29–27, 29–27)	3	5:00

=== Contract awards ===
The following fighters were awarded contracts with the UFC:

- Dustin Stoltzfus, Adrian Yañez, Cory McKenna, T.J. Laramie, and Impa Kasanganay

== Week 3 - August 18 ==
Dana White's Contender Series 29
- Promotion: DWCS
- Date: August 18, 2020
- Venue: UFC Apex Centre
- City: Las Vegas, Nevada, United States

Main Card
Weight class				Method	Round	Time	Notes
Welterweight	Louis Cosce	def.	Victor Reyna	TKO (punches)	1	1:12
Women's Strawweight	Cheyanne Buys	def.	Hilarie Rose	Decision (unanimous) (30–27, 30–27, 30–27)	3	5:00
Welterweight	Orion Cosce	def.	Matt Dixon	TKO (punches)	3	4:42
Heavyweight	Josh Parisian	def.	Chad Johnson	KO (punches)	1	3:43
Lightweight	Kenny Cross	def.	Kevin Syler	Decision (unanimous) (30–27, 29–28, 29–28)	3	5:00

=== Contract awards ===
The following fighters were awarded contracts with the UFC:

- Louis Cosce, Cheyanne Buys, Orion Cosce, and Josh Parisian

== Week 4 - August 25 ==
Dana White's Contender Series 30
- Promotion: DWCS
- Date: August 25, 2020
- Venue: UFC Apex Centre
- City: Las Vegas, Nevada, United States

Main Card
Weight class				Method	Round	Time	Notes
Middleweight	Jamie Pickett	def.	Jhonoven Pati	TKO (punches)	2	0:33
Featherweight	Rafael Alves	def.	Alejandro Flores	Submission (guillotine choke)	2	2:55
Flyweight	Jeff Molina	def.	Jacob Silva	Decision (unanimous) (30–27, 30–27, 29–28)	3	5:00
Lightweight	Anthony Romero	def.	Mike Breeden	Decision (unanimous) (30–26, 30–27, 29–28)	3	5:00
Middleweight	Collin Huckbody	def.	Kyron Bowen	Submission (arm-triangle choke)	1	1:28

=== Contract awards ===
The following fighters were awarded contracts with the UFC:

- Jamie Pickett, Rafael Alves, Jeff Molina, and Collin Huckbody

== Week 5 - September 1 ==
Dana White's Contender Series 31
- Promotion: DWCS
- Date: September 1, 2020
- Venue: UFC Apex Centre
- City: Las Vegas, Nevada, United States

Main Card
Weight class				Method	Round	Time	Notes
Featherweight	Melsik Baghdasaryan	def.	Dennis Buzukja	Decision (unanimous) (30–27, 29–28, 29–28)	3	5:00
Flyweight	Jimmy Flick	def.	Nate Smith	Submission (arm-triangle choke)	3	3:15
Bantamweight	Ronnie Lawrence	def.	Jose Johnson	Decision (unanimous) (30–27, 30–27, 30–27)	3	5:00
Light Heavyweight	William Knight	def.	Cody Brundage	TKO (elbows and punches)	1	2:23
Lightweight	Tucker Lutz	def.	Chase Gibson	Decision (unanimous) (30–27, 30–27, 30–27)	3	5:00

=== Contract awards ===
The following fighters were awarded contracts with the UFC:

- Jimmy Flick, Ronnie Lawrence, and William Knight

== Week 6 - September 8 ==
Dana White's Contender Series 32
- Promotion: DWCS
- Date: September 8, 2020
- Venue: UFC Apex Centre
- City: Las Vegas, Nevada, United States

Main Card
Weight class				Method	Round	Time	Notes
Light Heavyweight	Tafon Nchukwi	def.	Al Matavao	KO (head kick)	2	2:01
Lightweight	Sherrard Blackledge	def.	Cameron Church	Decision (unanimous) (30–27, 30–27, 29–28)	3	5:00
Middleweight	Phil Hawes	def.	Khadzimurat Bestaev	TKO (punches)	1	1:18
Bantamweight	Drako Rodriguez	def.	Mana Martinez	Technical Submission (triangle choke)	1	2:22
Middleweight	Aliaskhab Khizriev	def.	Henrique Shiguemoto	Submission (rear-naked choke)	1	0:50

=== Contract awards ===
The following fighters were awarded contracts with the UFC:

- Phil Hawes, Drako Rodriguez, Tafon Nchukwi, and Aliaskhab Khizriev

== Week 7 - September 15 ==
Dana White's Contender Series 33
- Promotion: DWCS
- Date: September 15, 2020
- Venue: UFC Apex Centre
- City: Las Vegas, Nevada, United States

Main Card
Weight class				Method	Round	Time	Notes
Middleweight	Jordan Williams	def.	Gregory Rodrigues	KO (punches)	1	2:19
Featherweight	Collin Anglin	def.	Muhammadjon Naimov	Decision (unanimous) (29–28, 29–27, 29–27)	3	5:00
Welterweight	Michael Lombardo	def.	Korey Kuppe	Decision (unanimous) (29–28, 29–28, 29–28)	3	5:00
Women's Featherweight	Danyelle Wolf	def.	Taneisha Tennant	Decision (unanimous) (29–28, 29–28, 29–28)	3	5:00
Featherweight	Kyle Driscoll	def.	Dinis Paiva	Decision (unanimous) (29–28, 29–28, 29–28)	3	5:00

=== Contract awards ===
The following fighters were awarded contracts with the UFC:

- Jordan Williams, Collin Anglin, and Danyelle Wolf

== Week 8 - November 4 ==
Dana White's Contender Series 34
- Promotion: DWCS
- Date: November 4, 2020
- Venue: UFC Apex Centre
- City: Las Vegas, Nevada, United States

Main Card
Weight class				Method	Round	Time	Notes
Light Heavyweight	Carlos Ulberg	def.	Bruno Oliveira	KO (punch)	1	2:02
Welterweight	Ignacio Bahamondes	def.	Edson Gomez	KO (front kick)	2	2:31
Featherweight	Luis Saldaña	def.	Vince Murdock	TKO (front kick and punches)	3	0:44
Heavyweight	Jared Vanderaa	def.	Harry Hunsucker	TKO (punches)	1	3:34

=== Contract awards ===
The following fighters were awarded contracts with the UFC:

- Carlos Ulberg, Ignacio Bahamondes, Luis Saldaña, and Jared Vanderaa

== Week 9 - November 10 ==
Dana White's Contender Series 35
- Promotion: DWCS
- Date: November 10, 2020
- Venue: UFC Apex Centre
- City: Las Vegas, Nevada, United States

Main Card
Weight class				Method	Round	Time	Notes
Middleweight	Mário Sousa	def.	Mariusz Książkiewicz	Decision (unanimous) (30–27, 29–28, 29–28)	3	5:00
Lightweight	Natan Levy	def.	Shaheen Santana	Submission (arm-triangle choke)	3	0:55
Lightweight	Nikolas Motta	def.	Joseph Lowry	Decision (unanimous) (30–27, 30–27, 30–27)	3	5:00
Women's Strawweight	Luana Pinheiro	def.	Stephanie Frausto	TKO (punches)	1	2:48
Bantamweight	Danny Sabatello	def.	Taylor Moore	Decision (unanimous) (30–24, 30–25, 30–26)	3	5:00

=== Contract awards ===
The following fighters were awarded contracts with the UFC:

- Natan Levy, Nikolas Motta, and Luana Pinheiro

== Week 10 - November 17 ==
Dana White's Contender Series 36
- Promotion: DWCS
- Date: November 17, 2020
- Venue: UFC Apex Centre
- City: Las Vegas, Nevada, United States

Main Card
Weight class				Method	Round	Time	Notes
Flyweight	JP Buys	def.	Jacob Silva	Submission (guillotine choke)	1	4:54
Heavyweight	Nick Maximov	def.	Oscar Ivan Cota	Decision (unanimous) (30–26, 30–26, 29–28)	3	5:00
Women's Strawweight	Gloria de Paula	def.	Pauline Macias	Decision (unanimous) (30–26, 30–26, 30–27)	3	5:00
Lightweight	Tucker Lutz	def.	Sherrard Blackledge	Decision (unanimous) (30–27, 30–27, 30–27)	3	5:00
Women's Flyweight	Victoria Leonardo	def.	Chelsea Hackett	TKO (punches)	2	4:41

=== Contract awards ===
The following fighters were awarded contracts with the UFC:

- JP Buys, Gloria de Paula, Tucker Lutz, and Victoria Leonardo
