= Chris Daukaus =

American mixed martial arts fighter

- Born: Christopher Paul Daukaus; September 25, 1989 (age 37); Philadelphia, Pennsylvania, U.S.
- Height: 6 ft 2 in (188 cm)
- Weight: 205 lb (93 kg; 14 st 9 lb)
- Division: Heavyweight (2013–2022); Light heavyweight (2023–present)
- Reach: 76 in (193 cm)
- Fighting out of: Philadelphia, Pennsylvania, U.S.
- Team: Martinez BJJ
- Rank: Black belt in Brazilian Jiu-Jitsu
- Years active: 2013–present

Mixed martial arts record
- Total: 20
- Wins: 12
- By knockout: 11
- By decision: 1
- Losses: 8
- By knockout: 6
- By submission: 1
- By decision: 1

Other information
- Occupation: Philadelphia Police Department (2010–2021)
- Mixed martial arts record from Sherdog

Christopher Paul Daukaus (/ˈdɔːkəs/ DAW-kəs; born September 25, 1989) is an American mixed martial artist who competes in the Heavyweight division of Cage Fury Fighting Championships. He previously competed for the Ultimate Fighting Championship (UFC). He is the older brother of UFC fighter Kyle Daukaus.

== Background ==
Daukaus was raised in Northeast Philly in the Tacony neighborhood. In 2007, Chris graduated from Northeast Catholic High School, and became a resident of Parkwood, Philadelphia. After graduating, he attended Pennsylvania State University before dropping out. He started training in mixed martial arts a year prior to enrolling into the police academy in order to fill the void of sports and competition after high school, and to follow in the footsteps of his father who was also a police officer.

== Mixed martial arts career ==
=== Early career ===
A professional since October 2013 and representing Martinez BJJ, Daukaus compiled an 8–3 record in 11 career bouts as a professional, winning by seven knockouts and one decision. Daukaus has competed with CES MMA, Cage Fury Fighting Championships, and Ring Of Combat. He has finished seven of his eight professional victories. In his MMA debut at XFE Cage Wars 27, he defeated Robert Duvalle via TKO in the first round. Daukaus also defeated Jeffrey Blachly via TKO in round two in his debut appearance with Cage Fury Fighting Championships at CFFC 50. He defeated Blachly a second time via a unanimous decision at CFFC 62. Then at KOTC Regulator, Daukaus defeated Anthony Coleman via TKO in the first round. He also defeated Plinio Cruz via TKO in round one at CFFC 69. For his lone outing with CES MMA at CES MMA 52 Daukaus defeated Joshua Marsh via TKO in the second round.

At Ring Of Combat 65, he faced Edwin Smart and defeated him via technical knockout in round one to earn the sixth knockout victory of his professional career.

Daukaus suffered a loss to Zu Anyanwu in a bout for the Cage Fury FC Heavyweight Championship at CFFC 73 on March 2, 2019. Daukaus was clearly winning that fight before a big shot changed the complexion of it quickly and Daukaus was knocked out.

He then faced Danny Holmes at CFFC 77 on August 16, 2019. He won the fight via first-round technical knockout.

Daukaus was then scheduled to face Shawn Teed for the Cage Fury FC Heavyweight Championship in a rematch at CFFC 82 on March 21, 2020. However, the whole event was postponed due to the COVID-19 pandemic. The event and the championship bout was rescheduled to take place at August 12, 2020. However, Daukaus signed with the UFC in early August and was replaced by Carl Seumanutafa.

=== Ultimate Fighting Championship ===
Daukaus made his UFC debut on nine days notice against Parker Porter on August 15, 2020, at UFC 252. He won the fight via TKO in the first round after a series of punches and a knee dropped Porter.

Daukaus faced Rodrigo Nascimento on October 11, 2020, at UFC Fight Night: Moraes vs. Sandhagen. He won the fight via knockout in round one. This win earned him the Performance of the Night award.

Daukaus faced Aleksei Oleinik on February 20, 2021, at UFC Fight Night: Blaydes vs. Lewis. He won the fight via TKO in round one. This win earned him the Performance of the Night award.

Daukaus was scheduled to face Shamil Abdurakhimov at UFC on ESPN: Sandhagen vs. Dillashaw, but the matchup would be postponed due to COVID-19 protocols within Abdurakhimov's camp. The bout was rescheduled to take place at UFC on ESPN: Hall vs. Strickland on July 31, 2021. However, the bout was postponed for unknown reasons to UFC 266. Daukaus won the fight via technical knockout in round two. This win earned him the Performance of the Night award.

Daukaus faced Derrick Lewis on December 18, 2021, at UFC Fight Night: Lewis vs. Daukaus. He lost the fight via knockout in the first round.

Daukaus faced Curtis Blaydes on March 26, 2022, at UFC on ESPN 33. He lost the fight via TKO early in the second round.

Daukaus was scheduled to face Jairzinho Rozenstruik on October 1, 2022, at UFC Fight Night 211. However, for unknown reasons, the bout was moved to UFC 282 on December 10, 2022. Daukaus lost the fight via technical knockout.

Daukaus was scheduled to face Khalil Rountree Jr. on June 10, 2023 at UFC 289. However on June 2, 2023, it was revealed that Daukaus suffered injury and was pulled from the card. The bout with Rountree was rescheduled for August 12, 2023 at UFC on ESPN: Luque vs. dos Anjos. Daukaus lost the fight via technical knockout in round one.

After the loss, it was announced that Daukaus was no longer on the UFC roster.

=== Post-UFC ===
Daukaus faced Tafon Nchukwi on August 16, 2024 at CFFC 134. He lost the fight by unanimous decision in the first decision loss in his career.

== Professional grappling career ==
Daukaus competed against Alexandr Romanov at Fury Pro Grappling 8 on December 30, 2023. He lost the match by decision.

== Personal life ==
Daukaus had been a Philadelphia Police Department officer since 2010. However, on December 1, 2021, in the lead up to his fight with Derrick Lewis, Daukaus decided to quit his position in the police force in order to fully concentrate on his MMA career.

He and his wife Kelly have a son.

== Championships and achievements ==
- Ultimate Fighting Championship
  - Performance of the Night (Three times) vs. Rodrigo Nascimento, Aleksei Oleinik and Shamil Abdurakhimov.
  - UFC.com Awards
    - 2020: Ranked #10 Newcomer of the Year

== Mixed martial arts record ==
Professional record breakdown
20 matches	12 wins	8 losses
By knockout	11	6
By submission	0	1
By decision	1	1

Res.	Record	Opponent	Method	Event	Date	Round	Time	Location	Notes
Loss	12–8	Tafon Nchukwi	Decision (unanimous)	Cage Fury FC 134	August 16, 2024	3	5:00	Atlantic City, New Jersey, United States	Return to Heavyweight.
Loss	12–7	Khalil Rountree Jr.	TKO (punches)	UFC on ESPN: Luque vs. dos Anjos	August 12, 2023	1	2:40	Las Vegas, Nevada, United States	Light Heavyweight debut.
Loss	12–6	Jairzinho Rozenstruik	KO (punch)	UFC 282	December 10, 2022	1	0:23	Las Vegas, Nevada, United States	
Loss	12–5	Curtis Blaydes	TKO (punches)	UFC on ESPN: Blaydes vs. Daukaus	March 26, 2022	2	0:17	Columbus, Ohio, United States	
Loss	12–4	Derrick Lewis	KO (punches)	UFC Fight Night: Lewis vs. Daukaus	December 18, 2021	1	3:36	Las Vegas, Nevada, United States	
Win	12–3	Shamil Abdurakhimov	TKO (punches and elbows)	UFC 266	September 25, 2021	2	1:23	Las Vegas, Nevada, United States	Performance of the Night.
Win	11–3	Aleksei Oleinik	TKO (punches)	UFC Fight Night: Blaydes vs. Lewis	February 20, 2021	1	1:55	Las Vegas, Nevada, United States	Performance of the Night.
Win	10–3	Rodrigo Nascimento	KO (punches)	UFC Fight Night: Moraes vs. Sandhagen	October 11, 2020	1	0:45	Abu Dhabi, United Arab Emirates	Performance of the Night.
Win	9–3	Parker Porter	TKO (punches and knee)	UFC 252	August 15, 2020	1	4:28	Las Vegas, Nevada, United States	
Win	8–3	Danny Holmes	TKO (head kick)	Cage Fury FC 77	August 16, 2019	1	1:30	Atlantic City, New Jersey, United States	
Loss	7–3	Azunna Anyanwu	TKO (punches)	Cage Fury FC 73	March 2, 2019	2	4:05	Philadelphia, Pennsylvania, United States	For the Cage Fury FC Heavyweight Championship.
Win	7–2	Edwin Smart	TKO (punches)	Ring of Combat 65	September 21, 2018	1	3:49	Atlantic City, New Jersey, United States	
Win	6–2	Jahsua Marsh	TKO (punches)	CES MMA 52	August 17, 2018	2	2:16	Philadelphia, Pennsylvania, United States	
Win	5–2	Plinio Cruz	KO (punch)	Cage Fury FC 69	December 16, 2017	1	2:38	Atlantic City, New Jersey, United States	
Win	4–2	Anthony Coleman	TKO (punches)	KOTC: Regulator	July 1, 2017	1	3:04	Stroudsburg, Pennsylvania, United States	
Win	3–2	Jeffrey Blachly	Decision (unanimous)	Cage Fury FC 62	December 17, 2016	3	5:00	Philadelphia, Pennsylvania, United States	
Loss	2–2	Shawn Teed	Submission (keylock)	Cage Fury FC 53	December 4, 2015	2	1:20	Philadelphia, Pennsylvania, United States	
Win	2–1	Jeffrey Blachly	TKO (shoulder injury)	Cage Fury FC 50	July 18, 2015	2	0:50	Atlantic City, New Jersey, United States	
Loss	1–1	Yordany Hernandez Figueroa	KO (punches)	Xtreme Fight Events 42	May 10, 2014	1	2:24	Chester, Pennsylvania, United States	
Win	1–0	Robert Duvalle	TKO (elbow and punches)	Xtreme Fight Events: Cage Wars 27	October 19, 2013	1	2:03	Chester, Pennsylvania, United States	Heavyweight debut.

== See also ==
- List of male mixed martial artists
