= UFC Fight Night: Moraes vs. Sandhagen =

UFC mixed martial arts event in 2020

- The poster for UFC Fight Night: Moraes vs. Sandhagen
- Promotion: Ultimate Fighting Championship
- Date: October 11, 2020
- Venue: du Forum
- City: Abu Dhabi, United Arab Emirates
- Attendance: None (behind closed doors)

Event chronology
UFC on ESPN: Holm vs. Aldana	UFC Fight Night: Moraes vs. Sandhagen	UFC Fight Night: Ortega vs. The Korean Zombie

UFC Fight Night: Moraes vs. Sandhagen (also known as UFC Fight Night 179, UFC on ESPN+ 37 and UFC Fight Island 5) was a mixed martial arts event produced by the Ultimate Fighting Championship that took place on October 11, 2020 at the du Forum on Yas Island, Abu Dhabi, United Arab Emirates.

== Background ==
Without fans in attendance, the promotion did not have to worry about the local timing of the event, so the plan was to proceed with normal timing for prime time hours on the east coast of North America. The main card was scheduled to begin at 4:00 am (October 11) local time in Abu Dhabi, with a full preliminary card beginning at approximately 1:00 am Gulf Standard Time.

A bantamweight bout between former WSOF Bantamweight Champion and UFC Bantamweight Championship challenger Marlon Moraes and Cory Sandhagen served as the event headliner.

A featherweight bout between Edson Barboza and Jeremy Stephens was briefly linked to the event. However, Stephens declined the fight after indicating he did not feel the date allowed him adequate time to prepare and safely make the required weight. Barboza was scheduled to face Sodiq Yusuff instead. In turn, Yusuff pulled out of the fight on September 21 due to undisclosed reasons. He was replaced by Makwan Amirkhani.

A flyweight bout between promotional newcomer Tagir Ulanbekov and Bruno Gustavo da Silva was expected to take place four weeks earlier at UFC Fight Night: Waterson vs. Hill. However, due to travel restrictions related to the COVID-19 pandemic, the pairing was rescheduled and took place at this event.

Rodolfo Vieira was expected to face Markus Perez in a middleweight bout at the event. However, Vieira pulled out on September 21 due to an injury sustained during training. He was replaced by former KSW Welterweight Champion Dricus du Plessis.

A middleweight bout between Abu Azaitar and Joaquin Buckley was expected to take place at the event. However, Azaitar pulled out on September 26 due to undisclosed reasons and was replaced by Impa Kasanganay.

A middleweight bout between Tom Breese and KB Bhullar was briefly scheduled to take place at UFC on ESPN: Holm vs. Aldana a week earlier, before being moved to this event.

A featherweight bout between Seung Woo Choi and Youssef Zalal was scheduled for the event. However, it was announced on October 2 that Choi withdrew from the fight. He was replaced by promotional newcomer Ilia Topuria.

A heavyweight bout between Serghei Spivac and Tom Aspinall was expected to take place at the event. However, Spivac withdrew from the bout in early October due to undisclosed reasons and was replaced by promotional newcomer Alan Baudot.

A women's bantamweight bout between Tracy Cortez and Bea Malecki was also scheduled for the event. Due to undisclosed reasons, it was announced on October 2 that promotional newcomer Stephanie Egger would replace Malecki.

The Ultimate Fighter: Latin America bantamweight winner Alejandro Pérez was expected to face Thomas Almeida in a bantamweight bout at the event. However, it was announced on October 2 that Pérez had been forced out of the bout after he tested positive for COVID-19. He was replaced by Jonathan Martinez and the bout then moved to UFC Fight Night: Ortega vs. The Korean Zombie a week later, where it took place at featherweight.

== Results ==
Main card (ESPN+)
Weight class				Method	Round	Time	Notes
Bantamweight	Cory Sandhagen	def.	Marlon Moraes	TKO (spinning wheel kick and punches)	2	1:03
Featherweight	Edson Barboza	def.	Makwan Amirkhani	Decision (unanimous) (30–26, 30–27, 29–28)	3	5:00
Heavyweight	Marcin Tybura	def.	Ben Rothwell	Decision (unanimous) (29–27, 29–27, 29–27)	3	5:00
Middleweight	Dricus du Plessis	def.	Markus Perez	KO (punches)	1	3:22
Heavyweight	Tom Aspinall	def.	Alan Baudot	TKO (elbows and punches)	1	1:35
Featherweight	Ilia Topuria	def.	Youssef Zalal	Decision (unanimous) (29–28, 29–28, 29–28)	3	5:00
Preliminary card (ESPN+)
Middleweight	Tom Breese	def.	KB Bhullar	TKO (punches)	1	1:42
Heavyweight	Chris Daukaus	def.	Rodrigo Nascimento	KO (punches)	1	0:45
Middleweight	Joaquin Buckley	def.	Impa Kasanganay	KO (spinning back kick)	2	2:03
Bantamweight	Tony Kelley	def.	Ali AlQaisi	Decision (unanimous) (30–27, 29–28, 29–28)	3	5:00
Featherweight	Giga Chikadze	def.	Omar Morales	Decision (unanimous) (30–27, 30–27, 30–27)	3	5:00
Women's Bantamweight	Tracy Cortez	def.	Stephanie Egger	Decision (unanimous) (30–27, 30–27, 30–27)	3	5:00
Flyweight	Tagir Ulanbekov	def.	Bruno Gustavo da Silva	Decision (unanimous) (30–27, 29–28, 29–28)	3	5:00

== Bonus awards ==
The following fighters received $50,000 bonuses.

- Fight of the Night: No bonus awarded.
- Performance of the Night: Cory Sandhagen, Tom Breese, Chris Daukaus and Joaquin Buckley

== See also ==
- List of UFC events
- List of current UFC fighters
- 2020 in UFC
