= Pauline Macias =

American martial artist (born 1988)

- Born: Pauline Macias; June 27, 1988 (age 38); Los Angeles, California, U.S.
- Other names: "Pita"
- Nationality: American
- Height: 5 ft 5 in (1.65 m)
- Weight: 115 lb (52 kg)
- Reach: 64 in (160 cm)
- Style: Mixed martial arts; Judo; Muay Thai
- Stance: Southpaw
- Fighting out of: Las Vegas, Nevada, U.S.
- Team: FactoryX Muay Thai
- Years active: 2018–present

Mixed martial arts record
- Total: 6
- Wins: 4
- By knockout: 1
- By submission: 1
- By decision: 2
- Losses: 2
- By knockout: 0
- By submission: 1
- By decision: 1
- Draws: 0
- No contests: 0

Other information
- Occupation: Professional MMA fighter; Power Slap competitor
- Last updated on: 21 February 2026

Pauline Macias (born June 27, 1988) is an American martial arist who competes in both MMA and Power Slap competitions as a strawweight.

Originally participating in Legacy Fighting Alliance from 2018 to 2021, maintaining a 3–2–0 record, she also competes in Power Slap, with a current 1-3–0 record.

== Career ==
Before entering MMA, Macias participated in judo for 20 years. As a child, she had trained with former judo world champion AnnMaria De Mars.

=== MMA ===
She is childhood friends with UFC and WWE fighter Ronda Rousey, who personally encouraged Macias to join the sport.

Macias has competed in five MMA competitions. She stated that her experience in judo, along with cheerleading and gymnastics, were all brought together in MMA. One of her matches included her fight against Gloria de Paula.

=== Power Slap ===
She competes in Power Slap where her current record is 1-3-0.

== Personal life ==
=== Political activism ===
Macias, alongside Rousey, provided food and supplies for Standing Rock protesters, who were protesting the approval of the Keystone and Dakota Access Pipelines.

== Mixed martial arts record ==
Professional record breakdown
| 6 matches | 4 wins | 2 losses |
| By knockout | 1 | 0 |
| By submission | 1 | 1 |
| By decision | 2 | 1 |

| Res. | Record | Opponent | Method | Event | Date | Round | Time | Location | Notes |
|---|---|---|---|---|---|---|---|---|---|
| Loss | 4–2 | Marnic Mann | Submission (triangle choke) | LFA 116: Fremd vs. Valente | 22 October 2021 | 3 | 3:57 | | |
| Loss | 4–1 | Gloria de Paula | Decision (unanimous) | Dana White's Contender Series 36 | 17 November 2020 | 3 | 5:00 | | |
| Win | 4–0 | Dana Zighelboim Grau | Decision (split) | LFA 82: Polizzi vs. Pogues | 21 February 2020 | 3 | 5:00 | | |
| Win | 3–0 | Sarah Shell | Decision (unanimous) | LFA 65: Royval vs. Sanchez | 3 May 2019 | 3 | 5:00 | | |
| Win | 2–0 | Maddie Meacham | TKO (punches) | LFA 57: Zalal vs. Mariscal | 18 January 2019 | 2 | 1:18 | | |
| Win | 1–0 | Brianna Smith | Submission (armbar) | V3 Fights 69 | 16 June 2018 | 1 | 1:40 | | |

== See also ==
- List of female mixed martial artists
