= Justin Tafa =

Australian mixed martial artist

- Born: 13 December 1993 (age 32); West Auckland, New Zealand
- Other names: Bad Man
- Nationality: Australian
- Height: 1.83 m (6 ft 0 in)
- Weight: 121 kg (266 lb)
- Reach: 74 in (188 cm)
- Stance: Southpaw
- Fighting out of: Brisbane, Queensland, Australia
- Team: Tafa Gang Fight Team/ NTG
- Trainer: Gerard Tafa
- Rank: Blue belt in Brazilian Jiu-Jitsu under Patrick Cronin
- Years active: 2017–2025

Mixed martial arts record
- Total: 13
- Wins: 7
- By knockout: 7
- Losses: 5
- By knockout: 2
- By decision: 3
- No contests: 1

Other information
- Mixed martial arts record from Sherdog
- Relatives: Junior Tafa (brother)

Justin Tafa (born 13 December 1993) is a New Zealand-born Australian former professional mixed martial artist. He competed in the Heavyweight division of the Ultimate Fighting Championship.

== Early life ==
Tafa was born in Auckland, New Zealand, to a family of Samoan descent, and grew up in the West Auckland suburb of Avondale. He and his siblings were raised by a single mother, Pouli Amanda Tafa. Tafa's maternal grandfather was a national boxing champion while his three brothers have also fought professionally. One of his brothers, Junior Tafa, is a former Glory heavyweight kickboxer and now a MMA fighter in the light heavyweight division of the UFC.

== Rugby league career ==
He played for the Marist Saints in the junior Auckland Rugby League and was signed to the Melbourne Storm. Tafa's athletic career began in rugby league, and he was signed to the Melbourne Storm and played in the under-20s competition but a run of injuries left him disillusioned with the sport.

== Mixed martial arts career ==
=== Early career ===
Tafa made his professional debut at XFC 30, with a second-round stoppage of Dylan Tiaaleaiga. Tafa was then scheduled to fight Jeremy Joiner for the XFC Heavyweight title, at XFC 36. He won the fight by TKO, after just 28 seconds.

Tafa was scheduled to make his first title defense against David Taumoepeau on 24 May 2019, at XFC 41. He won the fight by a second-round TKO, stopping his opponent 30 seconds into the second round.

=== Ultimate Fighting Championship ===
Tafa made his promotional debut on 6 October 2019, at UFC 243 against Yorgan De Castro. He lost the fight via knockout in the first round.

For his second fight with the promotion, Tafa faced Juan Adams on 8 February 2020, at UFC 247. He won the fight via TKO in the first round.

Tafa was scheduled to face Raphael Pessoa on 25 July 2020, at UFC on ESPN 14. However, he pulled out on 15 July for unknown reasons and was replaced by Tanner Boser.

Tafa faced Carlos Felipe on 16 January 2021, at UFC on ABC: Holloway vs. Kattar. He lost the bout via split decision. 16 out of 20 media scores gave it to Tafa.

Tafa faced Jared Vanderaa on 22 May 2021, at UFC Fight Night: Font vs. Garbrandt. He lost the bout via unanimous decision. This bout earned him the Fight of the Night award.

Tafa faced Harry Hunsucker on 18 December 2021, at UFC Fight Night 199. At the weigh-ins, Tafa weighed in at 267 pounds, 1 pound over the heavyweight non-title fight limit, marking the first time in UFC history that a fighter missed weight in that division. The bout proceeded at catchweight and Tafa was fined a percentage of his purse, which went to Hunsucker. He won the fight via knockout in the first round.

Tafa was scheduled to face Jake Collier on 30 April 2022, at UFC on ESPN 35. However, Tafa withdrew from event for undisclosed reasons, and was replaced by Andrei Arlovski.

Tafa was scheduled to face Don'Tale Mayes on 30 July 2022, at UFC 277. Tafa pulled out due to undisclosed reasons and was replaced by promotional newcomer Hamdy Abdelwahab.

Tafa faced Parker Porter on 12 February 2023, at UFC 284. He won the fight via knockout in the first round.

Tafa faced Austen Lane on 24 June 2023, at UFC on ABC: Emmett vs. Topuria. Less than thirty seconds into the bout, Lane accidentally eyepoked Tafa who was unable to continue, resulting in a no contest.

Tafa faced Lane in a rematch on 10 September 2023, at UFC 293. Despite suffering another eye poke, Tafa won the fight via knockout in round one. The win also earned Tafa his first Performance of the Night bonus award.

Tafa was scheduled to face Marcos Rogério de Lima on 17 February 2024, at UFC 298. However, Tafa withdrew the day before the event due to injury. He was replaced by his brother Junior Tafa.

Tafa faced Karl Williams, replacing his injured brother Junior Tafa, on 23 March 2024, at UFC on ESPN 53. He lost the bout by unanimous decision.

Replacing Marcos Rogério de Lima, Tafa was scheduled to face Kennedy Nzechukwu on 26 October 2024 at UFC 308. However, Tafa withdrew for unknown reasons and was replaced by Chris Barnett.

Tafa faced promotional newcomer Tallison Teixeira on 9 February 2025 at UFC 312. He lost the fight by technical knockout 35 seconds into the first round.

Tafa was scheduled to face Jhonata Diniz on 28 June 2025 at UFC 317. However, Tafa withdrew from the fight for unknown reasons and was replaced by promotional newcomer Alvin Hines.

Tafa was scheduled to face promotional newcomer Louie Sutherland on 28 September 2025 at UFC Fight Night 260. However, the bout was removed from the event during the weigh-ins due to Tafa suffering an illness.

After this bout was cancellation, on 10 October 2025, it was reported that Tafa was no longer in UFC roster and that he was stepping away from the sport.

== Championships and achievements ==
=== Mixed martial arts ===
- Ultimate Fighting Championship
  - Fight of the Night (One time) vs. Jared Vanderaa
  - Performance of the Night (One time) vs. Austen Lane
- Australian Xtreme Fighting Championship
  - XFC Heavyweight Championship (One time)
    - One successful defense

== Mixed martial arts record ==
Professional record breakdown
13 matches	7 wins	5 losses
By knockout	7	2
By decision	0	3
No contests	1	

Res.	Record	Opponent	Method	Event	Date	Round	Time	Location	Notes
Loss	7–5 (1)	Tallison Teixeira	TKO (knee to the body and elbows)	UFC 312	9 February 2025	1	0:35	Sydney, Australia	
Loss	7–4 (1)	Karl Williams	Decision (unanimous)	UFC on ESPN: Ribas vs. Namajunas	23 March 2024	3	5:00	Las Vegas, Nevada, United States	
Win	7–3 (1)	Austen Lane	KO (punches)	UFC 293	10 September 2023	1	1:22	Sydney, Australia	Performance of the Night.
NC	6–3 (1)	Austen Lane	NC (accidental eye poke)	UFC on ABC: Emmett vs. Topuria	24 June 2023	1	0:29	Jacksonville, Florida, United States	Accidental eye poke rendered Tafa unable to continue.
Win	6–3	Parker Porter	KO (punches)	UFC 284	12 February 2023	1	1:06	Perth, Australia	
Win	5–3	Harry Hunsucker	KO (head kick)	UFC Fight Night: Lewis vs. Daukaus	18 December 2021	1	1:53	Las Vegas, Nevada, United States	Catchweight (267 lb) bout; Tafa missed weight.
Loss	4–3	Jared Vanderaa	Decision (unanimous)	UFC Fight Night: Font vs. Garbrandt	22 May 2021	3	5:00	Las Vegas, Nevada, United States	Fight of the Night.
Loss	4–2	Carlos Felipe	Decision (split)	UFC on ABC: Holloway vs. Kattar	16 January 2021	3	5:00	Abu Dhabi, United Arab Emirates	
Win	4–1	Juan Adams	TKO (punches)	UFC 247	8 February 2020	1	1:59	Houston, Texas, United States	
Loss	3–1	Yorgan De Castro	KO (punch)	UFC 243	6 October 2019	1	2:10	Melbourne, Australia	
Win	3–0	David Taumoepeau	TKO (punches)	XFC 41	24 May 2019	2	0:30	Brisbane, Australia	Defended the XFC Heavyweight Championship.
Win	2–0	Jeremy Joiner	TKO (punches)	XFC 36	28 July 2018	1	0:28	Brisbane, Australia	Won the XFC Heavyweight Championship.
Win	1–0	Dylan Tiaaleaiga	TKO (punches)	XFC 30	20 May 2018	2	3:35	Brisbane, Australia	Heavyweight debut.

== See also ==
- List of male mixed martial artists
