= UFC Fight Night: Walker vs. Hill =

UFC mixed martial arts event in 2022

- The poster for UFC Fight Night: Walker vs. Hill
- Promotion: Ultimate Fighting Championship
- Date: February 19, 2022
- Venue: UFC Apex
- City: Enterprise, Nevada, United States
- Attendance: Not announced

Event chronology
UFC 271: Adesanya vs. Whittaker 2	UFC Fight Night: Walker vs. Hill	UFC Fight Night: Makhachev vs. Green

UFC Fight Night: Walker vs. Hill (also known as UFC Fight Night 201, UFC on ESPN+ 59 and UFC Vegas 48) was a mixed martial arts event produced by the Ultimate Fighting Championship that took place on February 19, 2022, at the UFC Apex facility in Enterprise, Nevada, part of the Las Vegas Metropolitan Area, United States.

== Background ==
A lightweight bout between former UFC Lightweight Champion Rafael dos Anjos and Rafael Fiziev was expected to serve as the event headliner. However, the bout was postponed to UFC 272 due to visa issues with Fiziev. Instead, a light heavyweight bout between Johnny Walker and Jamahal Hill served as the main event.

Jim Miller and Nikolas Motta met in a lightweight bout at this event. They were originally booked for UFC Fight Night: Smith vs. Spann in last September, but Miller tested positive for COVID-19 a week before that event and was pulled from the contest.

John Makdessi was expected to face Nasrat Haqparast in a lightweight bout. However, Makdessi pulled out due to injury and the pairing was scrapped.

A heavyweight bout between Ilir Latifi and Alexander Romanov was expected to take place at the event. However, Romanov withdrew due to injury and the bout was scrapped.

A middleweight bout featuring Julian Marquez and Kyle Daukaus was scheduled for the event. However, Marquez was pulled from the event due to undisclosed reasons. He was replaced by Jamie Pickett and the contest took place at a catchweight of 195 pounds.

Austin Lingo and Jonathan Pearce were expected to meet in a featherweight bout. However, Lingo pulled out due to undisclosed reasons. He was replaced by Christian Rodriguez.

A bantamweight bout between Mario Bautista and Khalid Taha was scheduled for this event. However, Taha had to pull out of the bout due to undisclosed reasons and was replaced by promotional newcomer Jay Perrin.

At the weigh-ins, Gabriel Benítez weighed in at 148 pounds, 2 pounds over the featherweight non-title fight limit. His bout proceeded at a catchweight and he was fined 30% of his purse, which went to his opponent David Onama.

== Results ==
Main card (ESPN+)
Weight class				Method	Round	Time	Notes
Light Heavyweight	Jamahal Hill	def.	Johnny Walker	KO (punch)	1	2:55
Catchweight (195 lb)	Kyle Daukaus	def.	Jamie Pickett	Submission (D'Arce choke)	1	4:59
Heavyweight	Parker Porter	def.	Alan Baudot	Decision (unanimous) (29–28, 29–28, 29–28)	3	5:00
Lightweight	Jim Miller	def.	Nikolas Motta	TKO (punches)	2	1:58
Middleweight	Joaquin Buckley	def.	Abdul Razak Alhassan	Decision (split) (28–29, 29–28, 29–28)	3	5:00
Preliminary card (ESPN+)
Catchweight (148 lb)	David Onama	def.	Gabriel Benítez	KO (punches)	1	4:24
Women's Bantamweight	Stephanie Egger	def.	Jessica-Rose Clark	Submission (armbar)	1	3:44
Featherweight	Chas Skelly	def.	Mark Striegl	TKO (knee and punches)	2	2:01
Women's Strawweight	Gloria de Paula	def.	Diana Belbiţă	Decision (unanimous) (29–28, 29–28, 29–28)	3	5:00
Bantamweight	Chad Anheliger	def.	Jesse Strader	TKO (punches)	3	3:33
Featherweight	Jonathan Pearce	def.	Christian Rodriguez	Decision (unanimous) (30–27, 29–28, 29–28)	3	5:00
Bantamweight	Mario Bautista	def.	Jay Perrin	Decision (unanimous) (30–27, 30–27, 30–26)	3	5:00

== Bonus awards ==
The following fighters received $50,000 bonuses.

- Fight of the Night: No bonus awarded.
- Performance of the Night: Jamahal Hill, Kyle Daukaus, David Onama, and Stephanie Egger

== See also ==
- List of UFC events
- List of current UFC fighters
- 2022 in UFC
