= Rodrigo Nascimento =

Brazilian mixed martial artist (born 1992)

- Born: Rodrigo Nascimento Ferreira; November 26, 1992 (age 33); Belo Horizonte, Minas Gerais, Brazil
- Other names: Yogi Bear; Ze Colmeia
- Height: 6 ft 4 in (193 cm)
- Weight: 264 lb (120 kg; 18 st 12 lb)
- Division: Heavyweight
- Reach: 80 in (203 cm)
- Fighting out of: Belo Horizonte, Minas Gerais, Brazil
- Team: Gordin Fight Team; American Top Team (2019–present)
- Rank: Purple belt in Brazilian Jiu-Jitsu
- Years active: 2012–present

Mixed martial arts record
- Total: 18
- Wins: 12
- By knockout: 2
- By submission: 6
- By decision: 4
- Losses: 5
- By knockout: 2
- By submission: 1
- By decision: 2
- No contests: 1

Other information
- Mixed martial arts record from Sherdog

Rodrigo Nascimento Ferreira (born November 26, 1992) is a Brazilian professional mixed martial artist. He competed in the Heavyweight division of the Ultimate Fighting Championship (UFC) and Professional Fighters League (PFL).

== Background ==
Born in Belo Horizonte, Nascimento met his mentor, Everton Rabelo de Andrade, at a LAN party while playing video games. Andrade taught kids and young adults martial arts in the city, and invited Nascimento to be part of the team. In October 2010, the teenager entered his gym and started his MMA career.

== Mixed martial arts career ==
=== Early career ===
Starting his professional career in 2012, two months after the death of his mentor, Nascimento got a perfect 8–0 record on the regional Brazilian scene, finishing his opponent in all eight bouts, 4 by submission and 2 by TKO.

Nascimento was invited to Dana White's Contender Series 22 and faced Michal Martinek on July 30, 2019. He won the bout via arm triangle in the first round, gaining a UFC contract in the process.

=== Ultimate Fighting Championship ===
Nascimento faced Don'Tale Mayes on May 16, 2020, at UFC on ESPN: Overeem vs. Harris. He won the bout via second round rear naked choke.

Nascimento faced Chris Daukaus on October 11, 2020, at UFC Fight Night: Moraes vs. Sandhagen. He lost the bout via first minute KO.

Nascimento was scheduled to face Alan Baudot on May 22, 2021, at UFC Fight Night: Font vs. Garbrandt. However, after Baudot was injured, the bout was moved to UFC on ESPN: Makhachev vs. Moisés held on July 17, 2021. Nascimento won the fight via technical knockout in round two. This win earned him the Performance of the Night award. However, Nascimento's urine test from the fight tested positive for ritalinic acid, a metabolite of psychostimulant drugs methylphenidate and ethylphenidate. As a result, Nascimento received a six-month suspension, retroactive to the test. He was also fined a total of $1,945.36, for the violation and subsequent legal fees. The bout was also overturned to a no contest.

Nascimento was scheduled to face Tanner Boser on April 23, 2022, at UFC Fight Night 205. However, Nascimento withdrew from the event for unknown reasons, and he was replaced by Alexander Romanov.

Nascimento was rebooked against Tanner Boser for September 17, 2022, at UFC Fight Night: Sandhagen vs. Song. Nascimento won the fight via split decision.

Nascimento faced Ilir Latifi on May 20, 2023, at UFC Fight Night 223. He won the fight via split decision.

Nascimento faced Don'Tale Mayes in a rematch on November 4, 2023, at UFC Fight Night 231. He won the fight via unanimous decision.

Nascimento faced former UFC Heavyweight Championship challenger Derrick Lewis on May 11, 2024, at UFC on ESPN 56. After being knocked down, he lost the fight via technical knockout from ground punches in the third round.

Nascimento faced Alexander Romanov on November 2, 2024, at UFC Fight Night 246. Nascimento lost the fight via unanimous decision.

On November 8, 2024, it was reported that Nascimento was removed from the UFC roster.

=== Professional Fighters League ===
Nascimento debuted with the Professional Fighters League at PFL 4 on May 1, 2025, and defeated Abraham Bably by split decision.

In the semifinals, Nascimento faced Oleg Popov at PFL 7 on June 27, 2025. He lost the fight via unanimous decision.

Nascimento faced Alexander Romanov in a rematch at PFL Chicago: Pettis vs. McKee, on April 11, 2026. He lost the bout via submission in the second round.

== Championships and accomplishments ==
=== Mixed martial arts ===
- Ultimate Fighting Championship
  - Performance of the Night (One Time) vs. Alan Baudot

== Mixed martial arts record ==
Professional record breakdown
18 matches	12 wins	5 losses
By knockout	2	2
By submission	6	1
By decision	4	2
No contests	1	

Res.	Record	Opponent	Method	Event	Date	Round	Time	Location	Notes
Loss	12–5 (1)	Alexander Romanov	Submission (guillotine choke)	PFL Chicago: Pettis vs. McKee	April 11, 2026	2	3:10	Chicago, Illinois, United States	
Loss	12–4 (1)	Oleg Popov	Decision (unanimous)	PFL 7 (2025)	June 27, 2025	3	5:00	Chicago, Illinois, United States	2025 PFL Heavyweight Tournament Semifinal.
Win	12–3 (1)	Abraham Bably	Decision (split)	PFL 4 (2025)	May 1, 2025	3	5:00	Orlando, Florida, United States	2025 PFL Heavyweight Tournament Quarterfinal.
Loss	11–3 (1)	Alexander Romanov	Decision (unanimous)	UFC Fight Night: Moreno vs. Albazi	November 2, 2024	3	5:00	Edmonton, Alberta, Canada	
Loss	11–2 (1)	Derrick Lewis	TKO (punches)	UFC on ESPN: Lewis vs. Nascimento	May 11, 2024	3	0:49	St. Louis, Missouri, United States	
Win	11–1 (1)	Don'Tale Mayes	Decision (unanimous)	UFC Fight Night: Almeida vs. Lewis	November 4, 2023	3	5:00	São Paulo, Brazil	
Win	10–1 (1)	Ilir Latifi	Decision (split)	UFC Fight Night: Dern vs. Hill	May 20, 2023	3	5:00	Las Vegas, Nevada, United States	
Win	9–1 (1)	Tanner Boser	Decision (split)	UFC Fight Night: Sandhagen vs. Song	September 17, 2022	3	5:00	Las Vegas, Nevada, United States	
NC	8–1 (1)	Alan Baudot	NC (overturned)	UFC on ESPN: Makhachev vs. Moisés	July 17, 2021	2	1:29	Las Vegas, Nevada, United States	Performance of the Night. Originally a TKO (punches) win for Nascimento; overturned after he tested positive for ritalinic acid.
Loss	8–1	Chris Daukaus	KO (punches)	UFC Fight Night: Moraes vs. Sandhagen	October 11, 2020	1	0:45	Abu Dhabi, United Arab Emirates	
Win	8–0	Don'Tale Mayes	Submission (rear-naked choke)	UFC on ESPN: Overeem vs. Harris	May 16, 2020	2	2:05	Jacksonville, Florida, United States	
Win	7–0	Michal Martinek	Submission (arm-triangle choke)	Dana White's Contender Series 22	July 30, 2019	1	3:16	Las Vegas, Nevada, United States	
Win	6–0	Everton dos Anjos	Submission (kimura)	JF Fight Evolution 18	October 7, 2017	1	1:39	Juiz de Fora, Brazil	
Win	5–0	Fabio Moreira	Submission (armbar)	BH Sparta 10	November 19, 2016	2	3:00	Belo Horizonte, Brazil	
Win	4–0	Fabricio Nascimento Silva	Submission (triangle choke)	BH Sparta 8	April 15, 2016	1	1:14	Belo Horizonte, Brazil	
Win	3–0	Ricardo Jordano	TKO (punches)	Full House Battle Home 6	March 29, 2014	1	0:39	Belo Horizonte, Brazil	Catchweight (231 lb) bout.
Win	2–0	Rafael Caixeta	Submission (rear-naked choke)	Full House Battle Home 5	April 21, 2013	1	2:43	Belo Horizonte, Brazil	
Win	1–0	Cicero Augusto	TKO (punches)	Full House Fight Night	March 24, 2012	1	0:42	Belo Horizonte, Brazil	

== See also ==
- List of male mixed martial artists
