= Azamat Murzakanov =

Russian mixed martial artist (born 1989)

- Born: Azamat Anzorovich Murzakanov; April 12, 1989 (age 37); Kyzburun III, Kabardino-Balkarian ASSR, Russian SFSR, Soviet Union (now Dygulybgey, Kabardino-Balkaria, Russia)
- Native name: Азамат Мурзаканов
- Other names: The Professional
- Nationality: Russian
- Height: 5 ft 11 in (180 cm)
- Weight: 205 lb (93 kg; 14 st 9 lb)
- Division: Light Heavyweight
- Reach: 71 in (180 cm)
- Stance: Southpaw
- Fighting out of: Fairfield, New Jersey, U.S.
- Team: K-Dojo Warrior Tribe
- Rank: Master of Sport in Army Hand-to-Hand Combat
- Years active: 2010–present

Mixed martial arts record
- Total: 18
- Wins: 16
- By knockout: 12
- By submission: 1
- By decision: 3
- Losses: 2
- By knockout: 2

Other information
- Mixed martial arts record from Sherdog

Azamat Anzorovich Murzakanov (Russian: Азамат Анзорович Мурзаканов; born April 12, 1989) is a Russian professional mixed martial artist. He currently competes in the Light Heavyweight division of the Ultimate Fighting Championship (UFC). As of October 24, 2026, he is #14 in the Meta UFC light heavyweight rankings.

== Background ==
Azamat Murzakanov was born on April 12, 1989, in the village of Kyzburun III (now Dygulybgey), Kabardino-Balkaria. After graduating from high school in 2006, he served in the internal troops, and after demobilization, he worked in the SOBR of the Ministry of Internal Affairs for the Kabardino-Balkarian Republic, where he met his future coach, Khachim Mamkhegov (honored trainer of Russia in hand-to-hand combat). With his experienced mentor, Murzakanov has achieved resounding success in national and international tournaments (multiple champion of Russia, 3-time world champion, gold medalist of the European and Asian championships, honored master of sports in hand-to-hand combat).

== Mixed martial arts career ==
=== Early career ===
In 2010, Azamat Murzakanov started his professional MMA career, training at the Unity Sports Complex in Nalchik. His debut took place on February 13, 2010, at the ProFC - Union Nation Cup 5 tournament, where he knocked out Anzor Khakimov in just 10 seconds. After a break due to work and studies, Murzakanov returned to fighting in June 2015, showcasing his knockout power at the ROC 51 event. In October 2015, he competed in the Polish promotion, Envio Fight Night, and won by unanimous decision.

In 2016, Murzakanov had three fights and achieved early victories in all of them. On May 14, he won via TKO at Global Proving Ground 24; on July 23, he defeated Bohdan Bulakh with a submission; and on October 2, he knocked out André Muniz, ending Muniz's eight-match winning streak. On April 15, 2017, Murzakanov competed in the Russian MMA league, Absolute Championship Akhmat, securing another quick finish against Georgy Sakaev at ACB 57.

Murzakanov signed with the UFC and was expected to face Joachim Christensen on June 25, 2017, at UFC Fight Night: Chiesa vs. Lee. However, Murzakanov was removed from the card on June 8 for undisclosed reasons. It was later announced that the reason was that Murzakanov had failed USADA doping test, testing positive for boldenone metabolites 5β-androst-1-en-17β-ol-3-one and androsta-1,4-diene-6β-ol-3,17-dione. Murzakanov was suspended for 2 years starting on September 2, 2017.

In late 2019, news surfaced that Murzakanov had applied to Brave CF openweight tournament with a prize of $100,000, and was eventually picked to be a part of the tournament. The tournament took part on November 15, 2019, at Brave CF 29, using his wrestling in the semi-final to defeat Guto Inocente via unanimous decision, before knocking out Mohammad Fakhreddine in the first round to win the tournament.

Murzakanov was invited for a second chance in the UFC, appearing on Dana White's Contender Series 37 on August 31, 2021, finishing Matheus Scheffel in the first round to win the bout and gaining a UFC contract.

=== Ultimate Fighting Championship ===
Murzakanov was scheduled to make his debut against Marcin Prachnio on November 20, 2021, at UFC Fight Night 198. However, the bout was later scrapped due to visa issues.

Murzakanov was once again scheduled to make his promotional debut against Philipe Lins on December 4, 2021, at UFC on ESPN 31. However, Lins withdrew from the event for undisclosed reasons and he was replaced by Jared Vanderaa. Shortly after the weigh-ins, officials announced that the bout had been canceled due to Vanderaa not being medically cleared.

Murzakanov made his UFC debut against Tafon Nchukwi on March 12, 2022, at UFC Fight Night 203 Despite losing most of the bout, Murzakanov won the bout after knocking Nchukwi out with a flying knee in round three. This win earned him the Performance of the Night award.

In his sophomore performance, Murzakanov faced Devin Clark on August 13, 2022, at UFC on ESPN 41. He won the fight via technical knockout in round three.

Murzakanov faced Dustin Jacoby on April 15, 2023, at UFC on ESPN 44. He won the fight by unanimous decision.

Murzakanov was scheduled to face Volkan Oezdemir on September 2, 2023, at UFC Fight Night 226. However, Murzakanov pulled out in early August for unknown reasons and was replaced by Bogdan Guskov.

Murzakanov was scheduled to face Khalil Rountree Jr. on December 2, 2023, at UFC on ESPN 52. However, Murzakanov suffered from symptoms related to Pneumonia and was removed from the event

Murzakanov faced Alonzo Menifield on August 3, 2024 at UFC on ABC 7. He won the fight by knockout in the second round. This fight earned him another Performance of the Night award.

Murzakanov was scheduled to face Nikita Krylov on November 16, 2024 at UFC 309. However, Murzakanov withdrew from the fight for unknown reasons.

Murzakanov was suspended from November 1, 2024 to May 1, 2025 from competing by CSAD after testing positive for LGD-4033 metabolites.

Murazakanov was scheduled to face Johnny Walker on May 17, 2025 at UFC Fight Night 256. However, for unknown reasons, the bout was moved to June 7, 2025 at UFC 316. In turn, Walker pulled out in early May due to injury and was replaced by Brendson Ribeiro. Murzakanov won the fight by technical knockout via submission to punches in the first round.

Murazakanov faced Aleksandar Rakić on October 25, 2025 at UFC 321. He won the fight by technical knockout in the first round.

Murzakanov faced former UFC Middleweight Championship challenger Paulo Costa on April 11, 2026, in the co-main event of UFC 327. Murzakanov lost by technical knockout via head kick in the third round, marking the first loss of his mixed martial arts career.

Murzakanov faced Dominick Reyes on October 24, 2026 at UFC 333. He lost the fight via knockout via a head kick and a punch in the first round.

== Personal life ==
In 2016, Azamat Murzakanov married wife Zalina, a graduate of the law faculty of the University. H.B. Berbekov. The family has a daughter and a son.

Azamat's younger brother, Marat, is a master of sports in hand-to-hand combat, serving in the border troops of the FSB of Russia.

== Championships and accomplishments ==
- Ultimate Fighting Championship
  - Performance of the Night (Two times) vs. Tafon Nchukwi and Alonzo Menifield
- Brave Combat Federation
  - Brave CF Openweight Tournament

== Mixed martial arts record ==
Professional record breakdown
18 matches	16 wins	2 losses
By knockout	12	2
By submission	1	0
By decision	3	0

Res.	Record	Opponent	Method	Event	Date	Round	Time	Location	Notes
Loss	16–2	Dominick Reyes	TKO (head kick and punches)	UFC 333	October 24, 2026	1	2:40	Abu Dhabi, United Arab Emirates	
Loss	16–1	Paulo Costa	TKO (head kick)	UFC 327	April 11, 2026	3	1:23	Miami, Florida, United States	
Win	16–0	Aleksandar Rakić	TKO (punches)	UFC 321	October 25, 2025	1	3:11	Abu Dhabi, United Arab Emirates	
Win	15–0	Brendson Ribeiro	TKO (submission to punches)	UFC 316	June 7, 2025	1	3:25	Newark, New Jersey, United States	
Win	14–0	Alonzo Menifield	KO (punches)	UFC on ABC: Sandhagen vs. Nurmagomedov	August 3, 2024	2	3:18	Abu Dhabi, United Arab Emirates	Performance of the Night.
Win	13–0	Dustin Jacoby	Decision (unanimous)	UFC on ESPN: Holloway vs. Allen	April 15, 2023	3	5:00	Kansas City, Missouri, United States	
Win	12–0	Devin Clark	TKO (punches)	UFC on ESPN: Vera vs. Cruz	August 13, 2022	3	1:18	San Diego, California, United States	
Win	11–0	Tafon Nchukwi	KO (flying knee)	UFC Fight Night: Santos vs. Ankalaev	March 12, 2022	3	0:44	Las Vegas, Nevada, United States	Performance of the Night.
Win	10–0	Matheus Scheffel	TKO (punches)	Dana White's Contender Series 37	August 31, 2021	1	3:00	Las Vegas, Nevada, United States	Return to Light Heavyweight.
Win	9–0	Mohammad Fakhreddine	KO (punches)	Brave CF 29	November 15, 2019	1	3:37	Isa Town, Bahrain	Won the Brave CF Openweight Tournament.
Win	8–0	Guto Inocente	Decision (unanimous)	Brave CF 29	November 15, 2019	3	5:00	Isa Town, Bahrain	Brave CF Openweight Tournament Semifinal.
Win	7–0	Georgy Sakaev	TKO (punches)	ACB 57	April 15, 2017	1	1:37	Moscow, Russia	
Win	6–0	André Muniz	KO (punch)	United Caucasian FC 1	October 2, 2016	1	0:50	Nalchik, Russia	
Win	5–0	Bogdan Bulakh	Submission (neck crank)	Fight Club Gladiator 4	July 23, 2016	1	0:35	Nalchik, Russia	
Win	4–0	Eric Ellerbee	TKO (doctor stoppage)	Global Proving Ground 24	May 14, 2016	1	1:52	Voorhees, New Jersey, United States	
Win	3–0	Alexey Sidorenko	Decision (unanimous)	Fight Nights Global 42	October 23, 2015	2	5:00	Saint Petersburg, Russia	
Win	2–0	Alec Hooben	TKO (punches)	Ring of Combat 51	June 5, 2015	1	0:20	Atlantic City, New Jersey, United States	
Win	1–0	Anzor Khakimov	KO (punch)	ProFC 13	February 13, 2010	1	0:10	Nalchik, Russia	Light Heavyweight debut.

== See also ==
- List of current UFC fighters
- List of Dana White's Contender Series alumni
- List of male mixed martial artists
