= Josh Stansbury =

American mixed martial arts fighter (born 1984)

- Born: November 19, 1984 (age 41); East Liverpool, Ohio, United States
- Other names: The Sandman
- Height: 6 ft 2 in (1.88 m)
- Weight: 205 lb (93 kg; 14 st 9 lb)
- Division: Light heavyweight
- Reach: 74 in (188 cm)
- Style: Wrestling, Boxing, BJJ
- Fighting out of: East Liverpool, Ohio, United States
- Team: Team Impact
- Years active: 2005–2018

Mixed martial arts record
- Total: 13
- Wins: 8
- By knockout: 1
- By submission: 5
- By decision: 2
- Losses: 5
- By knockout: 2
- By submission: 2
- By decision: 1

Other information
- Mixed martial arts record from Sherdog

Josh Stansbury (born November 19, 1984) is an American former mixed martial artist. He was the light heavyweight North American Allied Fight Series (NAAFS) champion in 2013 and formally fought for Bellator. Stansbury competed in Light Heavyweight division of the Ultimate Fighting Championship (UFC).

== Background ==
Stansbury was born in East Liverpool, Ohio, United States. His mother's family owned a business that travels to put on carnivals in the summer where Stansbury spent most of his summers at the carnival selling soft drinks and helping work the rides and games.

Stansbury started wrestling when he was six years old and he placed 4th Division 1 in the Ohio State Wrestling Tournament in 2002. His hopes of wrestling in college were not able to be realized and he went to work full-time when his girlfriend was pregnant and had a child not long after his high school graduation. However, he still went to do some open mat wrestling session during his spare time. One of the guys at the wrestling gym who was also a MMA fighter, Nick Spencer, invited him to do some MMA session with him and he was instantly hooked. He started his first fight two months later at the age of 21 in 2005 and won his first amateur fight, feeling a surge of emotion from cheering crowd, and never looked back.

(the cheer from the crowd) It filled that void of not going to college and not having wrestling.

As an amateur, he won and successfully defended the heavyweight title of Next Level Fighting four times. As a professional, he won NAAFS and Fight to Win light heavyweight titles. Stansbury was a Bellator veteran and held notable victories over Dane Bonnigson, John Hawk, and Dan Spohn.

== Mixed martial arts career ==
=== Early career ===
He started his amateur career in 2005 and made his debut on November 23 against Aaron Caw at NLF 2 and won his first win via KO on round one. He amassed a record of 9-2 prior moved to fight professionally. He fought most of his fights for North American Allied Fight Series and Bellator prior signed by UFC with a record of 7–2.

=== The Ultimate Fighter ===
==== The Ultimate Fighter 19 ====
Stansbury was one of the participants in The Ultimate Fighter 19, a UFC's reality TV series, where the show debuted on April 16, 2014. He fought Irishman Chris Fields in his fight to enter the TUF house. Stansbury dominated most of the round one but injured his left knee when he went for a takedown at the end of the round one. He lost the fight and failed to enter house as one of the contestants.

==== The Ultimate Fighter 23 ====
After his knee injury rehabilitation, Stansbury tried out The Ultimate Fighter 23. This time he managed to advance into the house, where Stansbury defeated Trever Carlson via Americana on round one.

On elimination round, Stansbury faced Abdel Medjedoub for Team Joanna Jędrzejczyk. He defeated Medjedoub via majority decision after two round with the score board of (20-18, 19-19, 20-18). Stansbury advanced to semi-finals round facing Cory Hendricks. Hendricks withdrew from the fight due to neck injury even though he was cleared by the doctor to continue on in the competition and was advised that he had a pinched nerve. Hendricks was replaced by Khalil Rountree, who was given the second chance by UFC president Dana White. Rountree defeated Stansbury via TKO on round one and ended his advancement to the final of TUF 23.

=== Ultimate Fighting Championship ===
Stansbury made his promotional debut on July 8, 2016 at UFC: The Ultimate Fighter 23 Finale against Cory Hendricks. He picked up a win via majority decision with the score board f (29-27, 29–27, 28-28).

He was expected to face Jake Collier on December 3, 2016 at The Ultimate Fighter 24 Finale. However, Collier pulled out of the fight in late October citing injury and was replaced by Devin Clark. After the three rounds, the judges handed down the win to Clark via unanimous decision.

On June 25, 2017, Stansbury faced Jeremy Kimball at UFC Fight Night: Chiesa vs. Lee. He lost the fight via TKO on round one.

On October 25, 2018, it was reported that Stansbury was released from UFC.

=== Superior Challenger ===
Stanbury faced upcoming light-heavyweight Swedish prospect Karl Albrektsson at Superior Challenger 18 losing via knockout.

== Championships and accomplishments ==
=== Mixed martial arts ===
- North American Allied Fight Series
  - North American Allied Fight Series Light Heavyweight Champion (One time) vs. John Hawk
- Fight to Win
  - Fight to Win: Prize Fighting Championship Light Heavyweight Champion (One time) vs. Jeremy Osheim

== Mixed martial arts record ==
Professional record breakdown
13 matches	8 wins	5 losses
By knockout	1	2
By submission	5	2
By decision	2	1

Res.	Record	Opponent	Method	Event	Date	Round	Time	Location	Notes
Loss	8–5	Karl Albrektsson	KO (punches)	Superior Challenge 18	December 1, 2018	1	4:56	Stockholm, Sweden	
Loss	8–4	Jeremy Kimball	TKO (punches)	UFC Fight Night: Chiesa vs. Lee	June 25, 2017	1	1:21	Oklahoma City, Oklahoma, United States	
Loss	8–3	Devin Clark	Decision (unanimous)	The Ultimate Fighter: Tournament of Champions Finale	December 3, 2016	3	5:00	Las Vegas, Nevada, United States	
Win	8–2	Cory Hendricks	Decision (majority)	UFC: The Ultimate Fighter 23 Finale	July 8, 2016	3	5:00	Las Vegas, Nevada, United States	
Win	7–2	Victor Jones	Submission (rear-naked choke)	GOTC MMA: Gladiators of the Cage 19	October 24, 2015	1	4:06	Cheswick, Pennsylvania, United States	
Win	6–2	Jeremy Osheim	Submission (guillotine choke)	Fight to Win: Prize Fighting Championship 7	November 21, 2014	1	3:42	Denver, Colorado, United States	Won the FTW Light Heavyweight title
Win	5–2	John Hawk	Decision (unanimous)	NAAFS: Rock N Rumble 7	August 24, 2013	5	5:00	Denver, Colorado, United States	Won the NAAFS Light Heavyweight title.
Win	4–2	Dan Spohn	Submission (guillotine choke)	Bellator 71	June 22, 2012	1	2:30	Chester, West Virginia, United States	
Win	3–2	John Opfar	Submission (guillotine choke)	NAAFS: Caged Fury 16	January 28, 2012	1	1:55	Morgantown, West Virginia, United States	
Win	2–2	Christopher Thad Schlichter	TKO (punches)	NAAFS: Caged Vengeance 8	September 24, 2010	1	2:22	Columbus, Ohio, United States	
Win	1–2	Dane Bonnigson	Submission (guillotine choke)	NNAAFS: Fight Night in the Flats 6	June 5, 2010	1	2:06	Cleveland, Ohio, United States	
Loss	0–2	Dan Spohn	Submission (guillotine choke)	NAAFS: Caged Fury 8	November 25, 2009	2	1:01	East Liverpool, Ohio, United States	
Loss	0–1	John Hawk	Submission (rear-naked choke)	NAAFS: Fight Night in the Flats 5	June 6, 2009	2	3:38	Cleveland, Ohio, United States	

== See also ==
- List of current UFC fighters
- List of male mixed martial artists
