= Jeremy Kimball =

American mixed martial arts fighter

- Born: Jeremy Kimball; March 1, 1991 (age 35); Burlington, Vermont, United States
- Other names: Grizzly
- Height: 6 ft 0 in (183 cm)
- Weight: 216 lb (98 kg; 15 st 6 lb)
- Division: Heavyweight; Light Heavyweight; Middleweight
- Reach: 72 in (183 cm)
- Stance: Orthodox
- Fighting out of: Colorado Springs, Colorado, United States
- Team: MMA Lab; Shingitai Jujitsu; Wildman Vale Tudo
- Years active: 2010–present

Mixed martial arts record
- Total: 33
- Wins: 21
- By knockout: 14
- By submission: 1
- By decision: 6
- Losses: 12
- By knockout: 6
- By submission: 6

Other information
- Mixed martial arts record from Sherdog

Jeremy Kimball (born March 1, 1991) is an American mixed martial artist who formerly competed in the Light Heavyweight division of the Ultimate Fighting Championship. A professional competitor since 2010, Kimball has also formerly competed for Bellator MMA and the RFA.

== Background ==
Kimball was born in Burlington, Vermont but raised in Colorado Springs, Colorado, attending Doherty High School. Kimball began training at the age of eight, under the tutelage of his father Ernest, an MMA coach.

== Mixed martial arts career ==
=== Ultimate Fighting Championship ===
Kimball made his promotional debut on January 28, 2017 against Marcos Rogério de Lima at UFC on Fox: Shevchenko vs. Peña. He lost via TKO in the first round.

Kimball faced Josh Stansbury on June 25, 2017 at UFC Fight Night 112. He won the fight in the first round via TKO. The win also earned Kimball his first Performance of the Night bonus award.

Kimball faced Dominick Reyes on December 2, 2017 at UFC 218. He lost the fight via submission in the first round.

Kimball faced promotional newcomer Darko Stošić on July 22, 2018 at UFC Fight Night: Shogun vs. Smith. He lost the fight via technical knockout.

=== Oktagon MMA ===
Kimball faced Thomas Narmo on April 9, 2022 against Thomas Narmo at Oktagon 32. He won the bout via TKO in the first round after Narmo was unable to continue due to leg kicks.

Kimball faced Hatef Moeil on October 15, 2022 at Oktagon 36. He lost the bout via TKO stoppage due to ground and pound in the second round.

Kimball faced Ruben Wolf on April 29, 2023 at Oktagon 42, winning the bout via TKO stoppage in the second round.

Kimball returned to Light Heavyweight to take on Alexander Poppeck on Marc 23, 2024 at Oktagon 55, losing the bout via first round ground and pound TKO.

== Championships and accomplishments ==
=== Mixed martial arts ===
- Final Fight Championship
  - FFC Light Heavyweight Championship (One time)
- Ultimate Fighting Championship
  - Performance of the Night (One time) vs. Josh Stansbury

== Mixed martial arts record ==
Professional record breakdown
33 matches	21 wins	12 losses
By knockout	14	6
By submission	1	6
By decision	6	0

Res.	Record	Opponent	Method	Event	Date	Round	Time	Location	Notes
Win	21–12	Danylo Kartavyi	Decision (unanimous)	Noc Gladiátorov 12	June 19, 2026	3	5:00	Lučenec, Slovakia	
Loss	20–12	Tadej Dajčman	TKO (submission to punches)	FNC Knockout 2	October 4, 2025	3	3:56	Maribor, Slovenia	
Win	20–11	Benjamin Šehić	Decision (unanimous)	FNC 21	February 15, 2025	3	5:00	Zadar, Croatia	
Loss	19–11	Alexander Poppeck	TKO (punches)	Oktagon 55	March 23, 2024	1	3:30	Stuttgart, Germany	Light Heavyweight bout; Kimball missed weight (213 lb).
Win	19–10	Ruben Wolf	TKO (punches)	Oktagon 42	April 29, 2023	2	4:05	Bratislava, Slovakia	Catchweight (229 lb) bout.
Loss	18–10	Hatef Moeil	TKO (knees and punches)	Oktagon 36	October 15, 2022	2	1:04	Frankfurt, Germany	
Win	18–9	Thomas Narmo	TKO (leg kicks)	Oktagon 32	April 9, 2022	1	2:58	Ostrava, Czech Republic	Heavyweight debut.
Loss	17–9	Timo Feucht	TKO (punches)	Oktagon 14	September 14, 2019	1	2:01	Ostrava, Czech Republic	Catchweight (216 lb) bout.
Win	17–8	Miloš Petrášek	Decision (unanimous)	Oktagon 11	March 16, 2019	3	5:00	Ostrava, Czech Republic	
Win	16–8	Miloš Petrášek	TKO (punches)	Oktagon 10	November 17, 2018	1	4:27	Prague, Czech Republic	
Loss	15–8	Darko Stošić	TKO (elbows and punches)	UFC Fight Night: Shogun vs. Smith	July 22, 2018	1	3:13	Hamburg, Germany	
Loss	15–7	Dominick Reyes	Submission (rear-naked choke)	UFC 218	December 2, 2017	1	3:39	Detroit, Michigan, United States	
Win	15–6	Josh Stansbury	TKO (punches)	UFC Fight Night: Chiesa vs. Lee	June 25, 2017	1	1:21	Oklahoma City, Oklahoma, United States	Performance of the Night.
Loss	14–6	Marcos Rogério de Lima	TKO (punches)	UFC on Fox: Shevchenko vs. Peña	January 28, 2017	1	2:27	Denver, Colorado, United States	Catchweight (209.5 lb) bout; Lima missed weight.
Win	14–5	Maro Perak	TKO (punches)	Final Fight Championship 27	December 17, 2016	3	4:44	Zagreb, Croatia	Won the vacant FFC Light Heavyweight Championship.
Win	13–5	Matt Van Buren	KO (punch)	Final Fight Championship 24	June 3, 2016	1	0:14	Daytona Beach, Florida, United States	
Win	12–5	Cody Mumma	Decision (unanimous)	RFA 34	January 15, 2016	3	5:00	Broomfield, Colorado, United States	Light Heavyweight debut.
Win	11–5	Jason Clayton	TKO (punches)	Rocky Mountain Rubicon 1	August 8, 2015	1	0:22	Pueblo, Colorado, United States	
Loss	10–5	Chris Camozzi	Submission (rear-naked choke)	Prize FC 7	November 21, 2014	1	3:33	Denver, Colorado, United States	Lost the Prize FC Middleweight Championship.
Loss	10–4	Perry Filkins	Submission (rear-naked choke)	Bellator 98	September 7, 2013	3	4:18	Uncasville, Connecticut, United States	Bellator Season 9 Middleweight Tournament Quarterfinal.
Win	10–3	Keith Berry	KO (punches)	Bellator 97	July 31, 2012	2	1:45	Albuquerque, New Mexico, United States	Catchweight (190 lb) bout.
Win	9–3	Chidi Njokuani	Submission (rear-naked choke)	RFA 7	March 22, 2013	2	1:51	Denver, Colorado, United States	Catchweight (180 lb) bout.
Win	8–3	Drew McFedries	Decision (unanimous)	Prize FC 1	January 25, 2013	3	5:00	Denver, Colorado, United States	Won the vacant Prize FC Middleweight Championship.
Win	7–3	Tom Speer	TKO (punches)	Made for War 1	October 13, 2012	2	2:29	Castle Rock, Colorado, United States	
Win	6–3	Richard Villa	KO (punches)	Fight Brigade MMA 1	August 24, 2012	1	0:58	Pueblo, Colorado, United States	
Win	5–3	Jason Lee	TKO (punches)	Fight to Win: Paramount Prize Fighting 2012	January 27, 2012	3	2:07	Denver, Colorado, United States	Won the vacant PTW Middleweight Championship.
Loss	4–3	Donnie Liles	Submission (inverted armbar)	Bring the Thunder MMA 2	October 1, 2011	2	4:09	Pueblo, Colorado, United States	
Win	4–2	Artenas Young	Decision (split)	Steel City Rumble 7	April 22, 2011	3	5:00	Grand Junction, Colorado, United States	
Win	3–2	Aaron Romero	TKO (punches)	Full Force Fighting 1	January 29, 2011	1	0:54	Denver, Colorado, United States	
Win	2–2	Cruz Chacon	KO (punch)	Rocky Mountain Bad Boyz: MMA Madness 3	December 4, 2010	1	0:38	Sheridan, Colorado, United States	
Win	1–2	Vinnie Lopez	KO (punch)	Steel City Rumble 6	October 9, 2010	1	0:58	Pueblo, Colorado, United States	
Loss	0–2	Chad Klingensmith	Submission (rear-naked choke)	King of Champions: World Collide	July 24, 2010	1	1:36	Denver, Colorado, United States	
Loss	0–1	Kenneth Seegrist	Submission (rear-naked choke)	Fight to Win: Phenoms	January 30, 2010	1	1:27	Denver, Colorado, United States	Middleweight debut.

== See also ==
- List of current UFC fighters
- List of Bellator MMA alumni
- List of male mixed martial artists
