= List of FFC champions =

Final Fight Championship (FFC) champions are fighters who have won FFC championships.

== Current champions ==
The FFC is currently using six weight classes for its MMA fights and five weight classes for its kickboxing fights. Non-title fights have a one-pound leniency.

=== Mixed martial arts ===
Weight class name	Current Champion	Title Defenses
Heavyweight	Shelton Graves @ (FFC 32)	0
Light Heavyweight	-	-
Middleweight	-	-
Welterweight	Ben Egli @ (FFC 31)	0
Lightweight	-	-
Featherweight	Filip Pejic @ (FFC 26)	1

=== Kickboxing ===
Weight class name	Current Champion	Title Defenses
Heavyweight	Mladen Brestovac @ (FFC 24)	5
Light Heavyweight	Pavel Zhuravlev @ (FFC 27)	0
Middleweight	Andi Vrtacic @ (FFC 28)	0
Welterweight	Shkodran Veseli @ (FFC 31)	0
Lightweight	Samo Petje @ (FFC 27)	0

== MMA championship history ==
=== Heavyweight Championship ===
Weight more than 205 lb (93 kg)

No.	Name	Event	Date	Reign (Total)	Defenses
1	(Netherlands) Dion Staring def. Ricco Rodriguez	FFC Futures: Super Finale; Opatija, Croatia	Dec 20, 2015	279 days	1. def. Andreas Kraniotakes at FFC 21 on Nov 27, 2015
2	(Serbia) Darko Stošić	FFC 26; Linz, Austria	Sep 23, 2016	277 days	1. def. Dion Staring at FFC 27 on Dec 17, 2016; 2. def. Emil Zahariev at FFC 28 on Mar 11, 2017
Stošić was stripped of the title on June 26, 2017, after he decided to fight for another organisation.
3	(United States) Shelton Graves def. Carl Seumanutafa	FFC 32; Las Vegas, Nevada, USA	Oct 19, 2018	? days	

=== Light heavyweight Championship ===
Weight less or equal to 205 lb (93 kg)

No.	Name	Event	Date	Reign (Total)	Defenses
1	(Poland) Marcin Prachnio def. Tomislav Spahovic	FFC 21; Rijeka, Croatia	Nov 27, 2015	335 days	
Prachnio was stripped of the title on October 26, 2016, after he decided to drop to the middleweight division.
2	(United States) Jeremy Kimball def. Marko Perak	FFC 27; Zagreb, Croatia	Dec 17, 2016	? days	
Kimball was stripped of the title.

=== Middleweight Championship ===
Weight less or equal to 185 lb (83.9 kg)

No.	Name	Event	Date	Reign (Total)	Defenses
1	(United States) David Mitchell def. Andy Manzolo	FFC 27; Zagreb, Croatia	Dec 17, 2016	? days	
Mitchell was stripped of the title.

=== Welterweight Championship ===
Weight less or equal to 170 lb (77.1 kg)

No.	Name	Event	Date	Reign (Total)	Defenses
1	(Hungary) Laszlo Senyei def. Ivan Gluhak	FFC 23; Vienna, Austria	Mar 18, 2016	223 days	
Senyei was stripped of the title on October 26, 2016, after he decided to go to the middleweight division.
2	(Croatia) Roberto Soldić def. Ivica Truscek	FFC 27; Zagreb, Croatia	Dec 17, 2016	? days	
Soldić was stripped of the title.
3	(United States) Ben Egli def. Roberto Neves	FFC 31; Las Vegas, Nevada, USA	Oct 12, 2018	? days	

=== Lightweight Championship ===
Weight less or equal to 155 lb (70.3 kg)

No.	Name	Event	Date	Reign (Total)	Defenses
1	(Hungary) Viktor Halmi def. Matej Truhan	FFC 15; Poreč, Croatia	Nov 21, 2014	? days	
Halmi was stripped of the title.
2	(Croatia) Luka Jelčić def. Danilo Belluardo	FFC 27; Zagreb, Croatia	Dec 27, 2016	? days	1. def. Roberto Pastuch at FFC 29 on Apr 22, 2017
Jelčić was stripped of the title.

=== Featherweight Championship ===
Weight less or equal to 145 lb (65.7 kg)

No.	Name	Event	Date	Reign (Total)	Defenses
1	(Croatia) Antun Račić def. Lemmy Krušič	FFC 14; Ljubljana, Slovenia	Oct 3, 2014	476 days	
Račić was stripped of the title on January 21, 2016, when he left the FFC for M-1.
2	(Bosnia and Herzegovina) Ahmed Vila def. Viktor Halmi	FFC 23; Vienna, Austria	Mar 18, 2016	190 days	
3	(Croatia) Filip Pejić	FFC 26; Linz, Austria	Sep 23, 2016	? days	1. def. James Brum at FFC 27 on Dec 17, 2016

== Kickboxing championship history ==
=== Heavyweight Championship ===
Weight more than 205 lb (93 kg)

No.	Name	Event	Date	Reign (Total)	Defenses
1	(Croatia) Mladen Brestovac def. Wiesław Kwaśniewski	FFC Futures: Super Finale; Opatija, Croatia	Dec 20, 2014	? days	1. def. Colin George at FFC 18 on Apr 17, 2015; 2. def. Steven Banks at FFC 24 on Jun 4, 2016; 3. def. Daniel Lentie at FFC 27 on Dec 17, 2016; 4. def. Dževad Poturak at FFC 29 on Apr 22, 2017; 5. def. Jhonata Diniz at FFC 31 on Oct 12, 2018

=== Light Heavyweight Championship ===
Weight less or equal to 205 lb (93 kg)

No.	Name	Event	Date	Reign (Total)	Defenses
1	(Croatia) Igor Jurković def. Dennis Stolzenbach	FFC 15; Poreč, Croatia	Nov 21, 2014	427 days	
Jerković was stripped of the title on January 21, 2016 due inactivity.
2	(Ukraine) Pavel Zhuravlev def. Brian Douwes	FFC 22; Athens, Greece	Feb 19, 2016	? days	

=== Middleweight Championship ===
Weight less or equal to 185 lb (83.9 kg)

No.	Name	Event	Date	Reign (Total)	Defenses
1	(Bosnia and Herzegovina) Denis Marjanovic def. Rene Wimmer	FFC 27; Zagreb, Croatia	Dec 17, 2016	85 days	
2	(Croatia) Andi Vrtacic	FFC 28; Athens, Greece	Mar 11, 2017	? days	

=== Welterweight Championship ===
Weight less or equal to 170 lb (77.1 kg)

No.	Name	Event	Date	Reign (Total)	Defenses
1	(Netherlands) Eyevan Danenberg def. Skhodran Veseli	FFC 26; Linz, Austria	Sep 23, 2016	212 days	1. def. Ivan Bilic at FFC 28 on Mar 11, 2017
2	(Slovenia) Samo Petje	FFC 29; Ljubljana, Slovenia	Apr 22, 2017	? days	
Petje was stripped of the title.
3	(Albania) Shkodran Veseli def. Francois Ambang	FFC 31; Las Vegas, Nevada, USA	Oct 12, 2018	? days	

=== Lightweight Championship ===
Weight less or equal to 155 lb (70.3 kg)

No.	Name	Event	Date	Reign (Total)	Defenses
1	(Slovenia) Samo Petje def. Teo Mikelić	FFC 14; Ljubljana, Slovenia	Oct 3, 2014	505 days	1. def. Valentin Rybalko at FFC 18 on Apr 17, 2015; 2. def. Tigran Movsisyan at FFC 21 on Nov 27, 2015
2	(Greece) Meletis Kakoubavas	FFC 22; Athens, Greece	Feb 19, 2016	270 days	
Kakoubavas was stripped of the title, because refused to defend his belt in a period of one year.
3	(Slovenia) Samo Petje (2) def. Tigran Movsisyan	FFC 27; Zagreb, Croatia	Dec 17, 2016	? days	

== See also ==
- List of current mixed martial arts champions
- Final Fight Championship
