= UFC Fight Night: Chiesa vs. Lee =

UFC mixed martial arts event in 2017

- The poster for UFC Fight Night: Chiesa vs. Lee
- Promotion: Ultimate Fighting Championship
- Date: June 25, 2017
- Venue: Chesapeake Energy Arena
- City: Oklahoma City, Oklahoma
- Attendance: 7,605
- Total gate: $549,302

Event chronology
UFC Fight Night: Holm vs. Correia	UFC Fight Night: Chiesa vs. Lee	The Ultimate Fighter: Redemption Finale

UFC Fight Night: Chiesa vs. Lee (also known as UFC Fight Night 112) was a mixed martial arts event produced by the Ultimate Fighting Championship held on June 25, 2017, at Chesapeake Energy Arena in Oklahoma City, Oklahoma.

== Background ==
The event was the second that the promotion has hosted in Oklahoma City, following UFC Fight Night: Diaz vs. Guillard in September 2009.

A lightweight bout between The Ultimate Fighter: Live lightweight winner Michael Chiesa and Kevin Lee served as the event headliner.

A featherweight bout between former UFC Lightweight and Welterweight Champion B.J. Penn and Dennis Siver took place at this event. The pairing was originally booked for UFC 199. However, the bout was cancelled due to Siver being injured.

Antônio Rogério Nogueira was expected to face Ilir Latifi at the event. However, on May 17, it was announced that Nogueira pulled out due to a neck injury. Subsequently, despite having six weeks to secure a replacement opponent, promotion officials elected to remove Latifi from the event entirely.

A featherweight bout between promotional newcomers, Jared Gordon and Michel Quiñones was expected to take place at UFC 211. However, Gordon pulled out of the fight on the day before the event due to stomach illness and as a result, Quiñones was removed from the card. The pairing was rescheduled for this event.

Promotional newcomer Azamat Murzakanov was expected to face Joachim Christensen at the event. However, Murzakanov was removed from the card on June 8 for undisclosed reasons and was replaced by fellow newcomer Dominick Reyes.

At the weigh-ins, former UFC Welterweight Champion Johny Hendricks and Jared Gordon missed the required weight for their respective fights, weighing in at 188 lb and 149 lb, respectively. They were both fined 20% of their purse which went to their respective opponents, Tim Boetsch and Michel Quiñones. The bouts proceeded at catchweight.

== Results ==
Main Card (Fox Sports 1)
Weight class				Method	Round	Time	Notes
Lightweight	Kevin Lee	def.	Michael Chiesa	Technical Submission (rear-naked choke)	1	4:37
Catchweight (188 lb)	Tim Boetsch	def.	Johny Hendricks	TKO (head kick and punches)	2	0:46
Women's Strawweight	Felice Herrig	def.	Justine Kish	Decision (unanimous) (30–26, 30–26, 29–27)	3	5:00
Light Heavyweight	Dominick Reyes	def.	Joachim Christensen	TKO (punches)	1	0:29
Welterweight	Tim Means	def.	Alex Garcia	Decision (unanimous) (29–28, 29–28, 29–28)	3	5:00
Featherweight	Dennis Siver	def.	B.J. Penn	Decision (majority) (28–28, 29–28, 29–27)	3	5:00
Preliminary Card (Fox Sports 2)
Lightweight	Clay Guida	def.	Erik Koch	Decision (unanimous) (29–28, 29–26, 30–26)	3	5:00
Middleweight	Marvin Vettori	def.	Vitor Miranda	Decision (unanimous) (29–28, 30–27, 30–27)	3	5:00
Women's Strawweight	Carla Esparza	def.	Maryna Moroz	Decision (unanimous) (30–27, 29–28, 29–28)	3	5:00
Lightweight	Darrell Horcher	def.	Devin Powell	Decision (split) (29–28, 28–29, 29–28)	3	5:00
Preliminary Card (UFC Fight Pass)
Catchweight (149 lb)	Jared Gordon	def.	Michel Quiñones	TKO (punches)	2	4:24
Lightweight	Anthony Rocco Martin	def.	Johnny Case	Decision (unanimous) (29–28, 29–28, 29–28)	3	5:00
Light Heavyweight	Jeremy Kimball	def.	Josh Stansbury	TKO (punches)	1	1:21

== Bonus awards ==
The following fighters were awarded $50,000 bonuses:

- Fight of the Night: None awarded
- Performance of the Night: Kevin Lee, Tim Boetsch, Dominick Reyes, and Jeremy Kimball

== Reported payout ==
The following is the reported payout to the fighters as reported to the Oklahoma State Athletic Commission. It does not include sponsor money and also does not include the UFC's traditional "fight night" bonuses. The total disclosed payout for the event was $1,225,000.

- Kevin Lee: $75,000 (includes $44,000 win bonus) def. Michael Chiesa: $36,000
- Tim Boetsch: $154,000 (includes $67,000 win bonus) def. Johny Hendricks: $80,000 ¹
- Felice Herrig: $50,000 (includes $25,000 win bonus) def. Justine Kish: $14,000
- Dominick Reyes: $24,000 (includes $12,000 win bonus) def. Joachim Christensen: $16,000
- Tim Means: $78,000 (includes $39,000 win bonus) def. Alex Garcia: $31,000
- Dennis Siver: $78,000 (includes $39,000 win bonus) def. B.J. Penn: $150,000
- Clay Guida: $110,000 (includes $55,000 win bonus) def. Erik Koch: $24,000
- Marvin Vettori: $24,000 (includes $12,000 win bonus) def. Vitor Miranda: $18,000
- Carla Esparza: $66,000 (includes $33,000 win bonus) def. Maryna Moroz: $23,000
- Darrell Horcher: $24,000 (includes $12,000 win bonus) def. Devin Powell: $10,000
- Jared Gordon: $18,000 (includes $10,000 win bonus) def. Michel Quiñones: $12,000 ²
- Tony Martin: $38,000 (includes $19,000 win bonus) def. Johnny Case: $23,000
- Jeremy Kimball: $24,000 (includes $12,000 win bonus) def. Josh Stansbury: $12,000

¹ Johny Hendricks was fined 20 percent of his purse ($20,000) for failing to make the required weight for his fight with Tim Boetsch. That money was issued to Boetsch, an OSAC official confirmed.
² Jared Gordon was fined 20 percent of his purse ($2000) for failing to make the required weight for his fight with Michel Quiñones. That money was issued to Quiñones, an OSAC official confirmed.

== Aftermath ==
On June 29, it was announced that Chiesa filed a complaint against referee Mario Yamasaki and an appeal of the result, citing referee Yamasaki's "long history of failing to meet the standards officials are held to" in his request. He also mentioned illegal elbows delivered by Lee and Yamasaki's stoppage of the fight; Chiesa stated "I did not tap, I did not verbally submit, I was not knocked unconscious, and at no point did I go unconscious." Oklahoma State Athletic Commission (OSAC) administrator Joe Miller confirmed he has received the request and will review the bout before potentially presenting it to the commission. On July 20, the OSAC decided there "wasn’t enough evidence" to overturn Yamasaki's decision.

== See also ==
- List of UFC events
- 2017 in UFC
