= Tafon Nchukwi =

Cameroonian-American mixed martial artist

- Born: 14 October 1994 (age 32); Bamenda, Cameroon
- Other names: Da Don
- Nationality: Cameroonian; American
- Height: 6 ft 0 in (1.83 m)
- Weight: 205 lb (93 kg; 14 st 9 lb)
- Division: Light Heavyweight (2020; 2021–present); Middleweight (2020–2021); Heavyweight (2019–2020)
- Reach: 77 in (196 cm)
- Team: Crazy 88 MMA (previously); Team Lloyd Irvin
- Rank: Blue belt in Brazilian Jiu-Jitsu
- Years active: 2019–present

Mixed martial arts record
- Total: 13
- Wins: 9
- By knockout: 4
- By decision: 5
- Losses: 4
- By knockout: 2
- By decision: 2

Other information
- Mixed martial arts record from Sherdog

Tafon Nchukwi (born 14 October 1994) is a Cameroonian mixed martial artist who competes in the light heavyweight division and competed in the UFC.

== Background ==
Born in Bamenda, Cameroon, Nchukwi's family moved to the United States in 2005. He played soccer in his youth, changing to football, baseball and wrestling during his high school years. He attended college, but dropped out after discovering mixed martial arts.

Nchukwi is a WKA ×2 2016 National champion, WKA ×2 2017 national champion, WKA ×2 2016 World champion. He is also a Jiu-jitsu blue belt and a 2017 IBJJF PAN Silver medalist.

Nchukwi flies the flag of the separatist banner of the Republic of Ambazonia.

== Mixed martial arts career ==
=== Early career ===
Making his MMA debut at CFFC 73, Nchukwi faced Alex Meyers and went on to defeat him via TKO in the second round. In his sophomore performance, Tafon defeated A.T. McCowin via TKO in round one at Shogun Fights 23. Returning to Cage Fury Fighting Championships at CFFC 80, he defeated William Knight via TKO in the first round. The win was controversial as the ref thought Knight was knocked out when covering up, for which the ref apologized afterwards.

In the main event of Dana White's Contender Series 32, Nchukwi knocked out Al Matavao in the second round. The victory earned Nchukwi a contract from the UFC in the process.

=== Ultimate Fighting Championship ===
In his promotional debut, Nchukwi faced Jamie Pickett at UFC Fight Night: Thompson vs. Neal on December 19, 2020. After knocking down Pickett in the third round, Nchukwi won the fight via unanimous decision.

In his sophomore appearance, Nchukwi faced Jun Yong Park on May 8, 2021 at UFC on ESPN: Rodriguez vs. Waterson. He lost the fight via majority decision after being deducted a point due to repeated groin strikes.

Nchukwi faced Mike Rodríguez at UFC Fight Night: Smith vs. Spann on September 18, 2021. He won the fight via unanimous decision.

Nchukwi faced Azamat Murzakanov on March 12, 2022 at UFC Fight Night 203 Despite winning most of the bout, Nchukwi lost the bout after getting knocked out by a flying knee in round three.

Nchukwi faced Carlos Ulberg on June 25, 2022, at UFC on ESPN 38 He lost the fight via TKO in the first round.

Nchukwi was scheduled to face Jamal Pogues on December 17, 2022 at UFC Fight Night 216. However, Pogues pull out from the bout due to undisclosed reason and was replaced by Vitor Petrino. Nchukwi eventually pulled out of the bout himself due to undisclosed reasons and the bout was scrapped.

Nchukwi faced A.J. Dobson at UFC on ESPN: Luque vs. dos Anjos on August 12, 2023. At the weigh-ins, Nchukwi came in at 189.5 pounds, three and a half pounds over the middleweight non-title fight limit. The bout proceeded at catchweight and Nchukwi was fined an undisclosed percentage of his purse, which went to Dobson. Nchukwi lost the fight via unanimous decision.

After the loss, it was announced that Nchukwi was no longer on the UFC roster.

=== Post-UFC ===
Nchukwi faced Chris Daukaus in a heavyweight bout on August 16, 2024 at CFFC 134. He won the fight by unanimous decision.

== Mixed martial arts record ==
Professional record breakdown
13 matches	9 wins	4 losses
By knockout	4	2
By decision	5	2

Res.	Record	Opponent	Method	Event	Date	Round	Time	Location	Notes
Win	9–4	Thiago Santos	Decision (split)	RCC Hard 21 x Gamebred FC	September 12, 2026	3	5:00	Chelyabinsk, Russia	Gamebred FC Heavyweight Grand Prix Quarterfinal.
Win	8–4	Marcos Rogério de Lima	Decision (split)	Gamebred Bareknuckle MMA 10	May 1, 2026	3	5:00	Miami, Florida, United States	Gamebred FC Heavyweight Grand Prix Round of 16.
Win	7–4	Chris Daukaus	Decision (unanimous)	Cage Fury FC 134	August 16, 2024	3	5:00	Atlantic City, New Jersey, United States	Return to Heavyweight.
Loss	6–4	A.J. Dobson	Decision (unanimous)	UFC on ESPN: Luque vs. dos Anjos	August 12, 2023	3	5:00	Las Vegas, Nevada, United States	Middleweight bout; Nchukwi missed weight (189 lb).
Loss	6–3	Carlos Ulberg	TKO (punches)	UFC on ESPN: Tsarukyan vs. Gamrot	June 25, 2022	1	1:15	Las Vegas, Nevada, United States	
Loss	6–2	Azamat Murzakanov	KO (flying knee)	UFC Fight Night: Santos vs. Ankalaev	March 12, 2022	3	0:44	Las Vegas, Nevada, United States	
Win	6–1	Mike Rodríguez	Decision (unanimous)	UFC Fight Night: Smith vs. Spann	September 18, 2021	3	5:00	Las Vegas, Nevada, United States	Return to Light Heavyweight.
Loss	5–1	Park Jun-yong	Decision (majority)	UFC on ESPN: Rodriguez vs. Waterson	May 8, 2021	3	5:00	Las Vegas, Nevada, United States	Nchukwi was deducted one point in round 2 due to repeated groin strikes.
Win	5–0	Jamie Pickett	Decision (unanimous)	UFC Fight Night: Thompson vs. Neal	December 19, 2020	3	5:00	Las Vegas, Nevada, United States	Middleweight debut.
Win	4–0	Al Matavao	KO (head kick)	Dana White's Contender Series 32	September 8, 2020	2	2:01	Las Vegas, Nevada, United States	Light Heavyweight debut.
Win	3–0	William Knight	TKO (punches)	Cage Fury FC 80	November 22, 2019	1	2:30	Hampton, Virginia, United States	Catchweight (225 lb) bout.
Win	2–0	A.T. McCowin	TKO (punches)	Shogun Fights 23	November 2, 2019	1	2:27	Baltimore, Maryland, United States	
Win	1–0	Alex Meyers	KO (punch)	Cage Fury FC 73	March 2, 2019	2	2:15	Philadelphia, Pennsylvania, United States	Heavyweight debut.

== See also ==
- List of male mixed martial artists
