= Marcos Rogério de Lima =

Brazilian mixed martial arts fighter

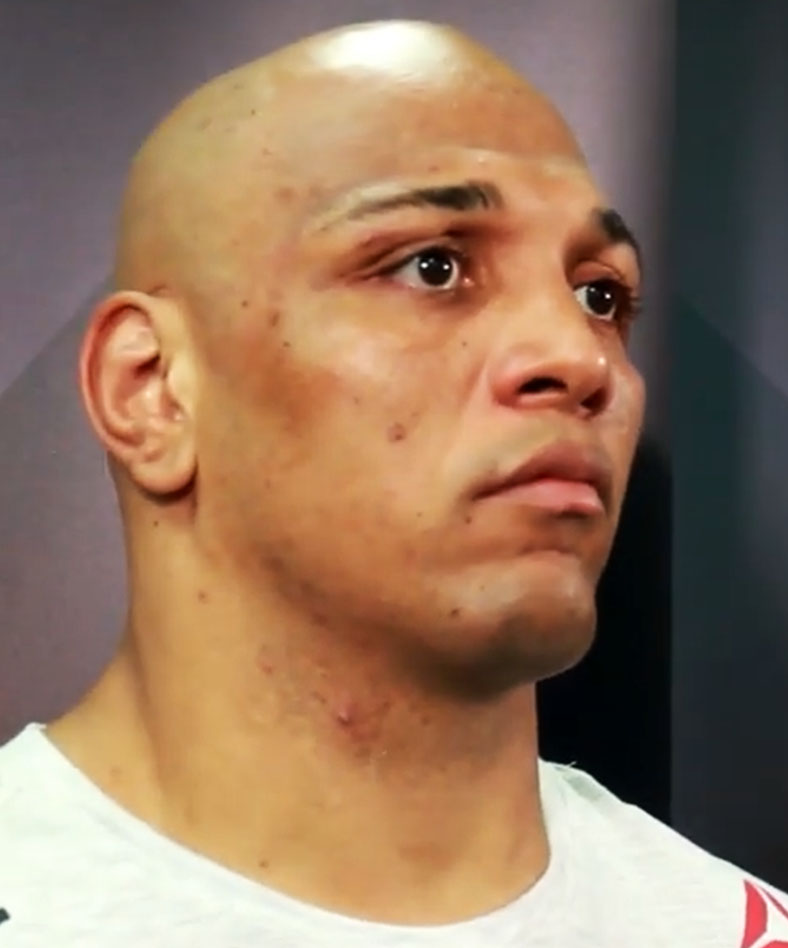
- Marcos Rogério de Lima at UFC 230 New York, United States on Nov 3, 2018
- Born: Marcos Rogério de Lima; May 25, 1985 (age 41); Ribeirão Pires, São Paulo, Brazil
- Other names: Pezão (portuguese for Bigfoot)
- Height: 6 ft 1 in (185 cm)
- Weight: 262 lb (119 kg; 18 st 10 lb)
- Division: Heavyweight; Light heavyweight Middleweight
- Reach: 75 in (191 cm)
- Fighting out of: Ribeirão Pires, São Paulo, Brazil
- Team: 011 MMA Team; American Top Team
- Rank: Black belt in Brazilian Jiu-Jitsu
- Years active: 2009–present

Mixed martial arts record
- Total: 34
- Wins: 23
- By knockout: 16
- By submission: 3
- By decision: 4
- Losses: 10
- By knockout: 2
- By submission: 5
- By decision: 3
- Draws: 1

Other information
- Mixed martial arts record from Sherdog

Marcos Rogério de Lima (born May 25, 1985) is a Brazilian mixed martial artist who competed in the heavyweight division of the Ultimate Fighting Championship. A professional since 2009, he formerly competed for Strikeforce, Shooto, and was a contestant on The Ultimate Fighter: Brazil 3.

== Mixed martial arts career ==
=== Early career ===
Lima made a name for himself fighting on his home country of Brazil. With an undefeated professional record, Lima surprised when defeated the heavy favorite and former WEC middleweight champion Paulo Filho.

After his win against Filho, Lima was signed by Strikeforce. He made his debut on September 10, 2011, against Mike Kyle at Strikeforce: Barnett vs. Kharitonov, losing the fight via unanimous decision.

Following his debut defeat, Lima was released from Strikeforce. He fought for the Shooto Brazil light heavyweight championship at Shooto Brazil 29 on April 26, 2012, against Carlos Eduardo, losing the fight via knockout in the second round.

=== The Ultimate Fighter ===
On February 26, 2014, it was revealed that Lima was selected to be a participant on The Ultimate Fighter: Brazil 3. Lima defeated Thiago Santos via submission to move into the Ultimate Fighter house, and become an official cast member.

Lima was selected as the first pick (first overall) of coach Chael Sonnen to be a part of Team Sonnen. In his second Heavyweight fight of the season, Lima was selected to fight Jollyson Francisco and won via unanimous decision. He was then scheduled to face Antônio Carlos Júnior for a spot in the final against Vitor Miranda. He was defeated by submission (rear-naked choke).

=== Ultimate Fighting Championship ===
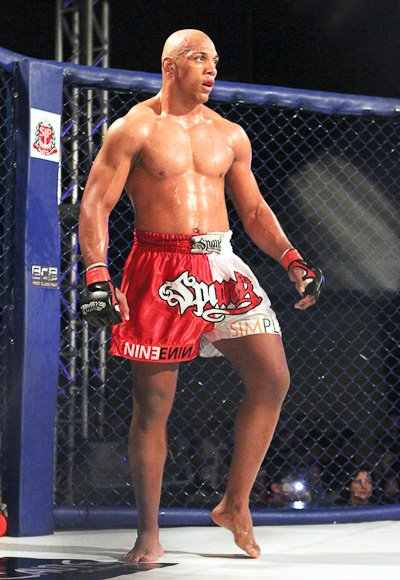
Marcos Rogério "Pezão" de Lima in MMA competition

Lima made his promotional debut on May 31, 2014, at The Ultimate Fighter Brazil 3 Finale against Richardson Moreira. He won the fight via knockout in the first round.

In his second bout for the promotion, Lima faced Igor Pokrajac in the light heavyweight division on December 20, 2014, at UFC Fight Night: Machida vs. Dollaway. He won the fight via TKO in the first round.

He was briefly linked to a bout with Nikita Krylov on June 20, 2015, at UFC Fight Night 69. However, the pairing was booked to take place a week later at UFC Fight Night 70. Subsequently, Lima was removed from the card on June 19, after visa issues restricted his entry to the United States. The bout with Krylov eventually took place on August 23, 2015, at UFC Fight Night 74, with Lima losing by way of submission due to a rear naked choke in the first round.

Lima next faced Clint Hester on April 23, 2016, at UFC 197. He won the one sided fight via submission in the first round.

Lima was briefly linked to a bout with Gian Villante on November 12, 2016, at UFC 205. However, Villante pulled out of the fight on September 21 citing injury and the bout was scrapped. Subsequently, Lima was quickly rescheduled and faced promotional newcomer Gadzhimurad Antigulov the following week at UFC Fight Night 100. He was quickly submitted in the first round.

Lima next faced Jeremy Kimball at UFC on Fox: Shevchenko vs. Peña on January 28, 2017. At the weigh-ins, Lima came in at 209.5 lbs, over the light heavyweight limit of 206 lbs. As a result, Lima was fined 20% of his purse, which went to Kimball and the bout proceeded as scheduled at catchweight. He won the fight via TKO in the first round.

Lima next faced Ovince Saint Preux on April 22, 2017, at UFC Fight Night 108. At the weigh ins, Lima weighed in at 210 pounds, 4 pounds over the light heavyweight limit of 206. This was the second time consecutively Lima missed weight. As a result, he was fined 30% of his fight purse which will go to Saint Preux. The bout proceeded as a catchweight. He lost the fight via submission in the second round.

Lima was expected to face Saparbek Safarov on September 2, 2017, at UFC Fight Night 115. Before the weigh ins, the UFC announced that Lima had failed an out-of-competition drug screening, testing positive for the banned Anabolic steroids. As a result, the bout was cancelled. On April 24, 2018, Lima was cleared of intentional use of performance-enhancing drugs (PEDs) by USADA, where Lima was believed to have taken tainted supplement which contained hydrochlorothiazide and anastrozole from the compounding pharmacies in Brazil. He is eligible to compete immediately as of April 24, 2018.

Lima faced Ruslan Magomedov on November 3, 2018, at UFC 230. However, it was reported on October 24, 2018, that he pulled out from the event due to visa issues and he was replaced by Adam Wieczorek. He won the fight via unanimous decision.

Lima faced Stefan Struve on February 23, 2019, at UFC on ESPN+ 3. He lost the fight via submission in the second round.

Lima faced Ben Sosoli on February 23, 2020, at UFC Fight Night: Felder vs. Hooker. He won the fight via TKO in the first round.

Lima was scheduled to face Alexander Romanov on September 5, 2020, at UFC Fight Night 176. However, on September 5, 2020, Lima was tested positive for Covid-19 and the bout against Romanov was cancelled. In turn, the bout was rescheduled and eventually took place on November 7, 2020, at UFC on ESPN: Santos vs. Teixeira. Lima lost the fight via a submission in round one.

Lima faced Maurice Greene on May 8, 2021, at UFC on ESPN 24. He won the fight via unanimous decision.

Lima faced Ben Rothwell on November 13, 2021, at UFC Fight Night 197. He won the fight via technical knockout in round one.

Lima faced Blagoy Ivanov on May 7, 2022, at UFC 274. He lost the fight via unanimous decision.

Lima faced Andrei Arlovski on October 29, 2022, at UFC Fight Night 213. He won the fight via rear-naked choke in round one.

Lima faced Waldo Cortes-Acosta on April 29, 2023, at UFC on ESPN: Song vs. Simón. He won the fight via unanimous decision.

Lima faced Derrick Lewis on July 29, 2023, at UFC 291. He lost the fight via TKO stoppage in round one after being dropped by a flying knee and then finished with ground and pound.

Lima was scheduled to face Justin Tafa on February 17, 2024, at UFC 298. However, Tafa withdrew the day before the event due to injury. He was replaced by his brother Junior Tafa. Lima won the bout by technical knockout in round two after dropping Tafa with leg kicks.

Lima was scheduled to face Kennedy Nzechukwu on October 26, 2024 at UFC 308. However, Lima withdrew from the fight for unknown reasons and was replaced by Justin Tafa, who was subsequently replaced by Chris Barnett due to an injury.

On March 7, 2025, it was reported that Lima tested positive for banned substance anastrozole and because it was a second violation, the UFC drug testing program Combat Sports Anti-Doping (CSAD) extended the duration of his suspension to 12 months which makes him eligible to compete on January 24, 2026.

On March 17, 2025, shortly after Lima's suspension, it was reported that he was removed from the UFC roster.

== Mixed martial arts record ==
Professional record breakdown
34 matches	23 wins	10 losses
By knockout	16	2
By submission	3	5
By decision	4	3
Draws	1	

Res.	Record	Opponent	Method	Event	Date	Round	Time	Location	Notes
Loss	23–10–1	Tafon Nchukwi	Decision (split)	Gamebred Bareknuckle MMA 10	May 1, 2026	3	5:00	Miami, Florida, United States	Bare Knuckle MMA. 2026 Gamebred FC Heavyweight Tournament Round of 16.
Win	23–9–1	Kodirhon Ganiev	TKO (punches)	World X-Impact Federation: APEC 2025 Korea Summit Commemorative World MMA Competition	October 30, 2025	2	3:53	Seoul, South Korea	Catchweight (262 lb) bout.
Win	22–9–1	Junior Tafa	TKO (leg kick and punches)	UFC 298	February 17, 2024	2	1:14	Anaheim, California, United States	
Loss	21–9–1	Derrick Lewis	TKO (punches)	UFC 291	July 29, 2023	1	0:33	Salt Lake City, Utah, United States	
Win	21–8–1	Waldo Cortes-Acosta	Decision (unanimous)	UFC on ESPN: Song vs. Simón	April 29, 2023	3	5:00	Las Vegas, Nevada, United States	
Win	20–8–1	Andrei Arlovski	Submission (rear-naked choke)	UFC Fight Night: Kattar vs. Allen	October 29, 2022	1	1:50	Las Vegas, Nevada, United States	
Loss	19–8–1	Blagoy Ivanov	Decision (unanimous)	UFC 274	May 7, 2022	3	5:00	Phoenix, Arizona, United States	
Win	19–7–1	Ben Rothwell	TKO (punches)	UFC Fight Night: Holloway vs. Rodríguez	November 13, 2021	1	0:32	Las Vegas, Nevada, United States	
Win	18–7–1	Maurice Greene	Decision (unanimous)	UFC on ESPN: Rodriguez vs. Waterson	May 8, 2021	3	5:00	Las Vegas, Nevada, United States	
Loss	17–7–1	Alexander Romanov	Technical Submission (forearm choke)	UFC on ESPN: Santos vs. Teixeira	November 7, 2020	1	4:48	Las Vegas, Nevada, United States	
Win	17–6–1	Ben Sosoli	TKO (punches)	UFC Fight Night: Felder vs. Hooker	February 23, 2020	1	1:28	Auckland, New Zealand	
Loss	16–6–1	Stefan Struve	Submission (arm-triangle choke)	UFC Fight Night: Błachowicz vs. Santos	February 23, 2019	2	2:21	Prague, Czech Republic	
Win	16–5–1	Adam Wieczorek	Decision (unanimous)	UFC 230	November 3, 2018	3	5:00	New York City, New York, United States	Return to Heavyweight.
Loss	15–5–1	Ovince Saint Preux	Submission (Von Flue choke)	UFC Fight Night: Swanson vs. Lobov	April 22, 2017	2	2:11	Nashville, Tennessee, United States	Catchweight (210 lb) bout; Lima missed weight.
Win	15–4–1	Jeremy Kimball	TKO (punches)	UFC on Fox: Shevchenko vs. Peña	January 28, 2017	1	2:27	Denver, Colorado, United States	Catchweight (209.5 lb) bout; Lima missed weight.
Loss	14–4–1	Gadzhimurad Antigulov	Submission (guillotine choke)	UFC Fight Night: Bader vs. Nogueira 2	November 19, 2016	1	1:07	São Paulo, Brazil	
Win	14–3–1	Clint Hester	Submission (arm-triangle choke)	UFC 197	April 23, 2016	1	4:35	Las Vegas, Nevada, United States	
Loss	13–3–1	Nikita Krylov	Submission (rear-naked choke)	UFC Fight Night: Holloway vs. Oliveira	August 23, 2015	1	2:29	Saskatoon, Saskatchewan, Canada	
Win	13–2–1	Igor Pokrajac	TKO (punches)	UFC Fight Night: Machida vs. Dollaway	December 20, 2014	1	1:59	Barueri, Brazil	Return to Light Heavyweight.
Win	12–2–1	Richardson Moreira	KO (punches)	The Ultimate Fighter Brazil 3 Finale: Miocic vs. Maldonado	May 31, 2014	1	0:20	São Paulo, Brazil	Heavyweight bout.
Draw	11–2–1	Ben Reiter	Draw (unanimous)	Inka FC 22	August 29, 2013	3	5:00	Lima, Peru	Middleweight debut.
Win	11–2	Antonio Sales Junior	TKO (punches)	Fair Fight: MMA Edition	December 16, 2012	1	3:46	São Paulo, Brazil	
Win	10–2	Valter Luiz da Silva	TKO (punches)	Max Sport 3.1	November 10, 2012	1	4:20	São Paulo, Brazil	
Win	9–2	Fabiano Adams	Submission (arm-triangle choke)	Shooto Brazil 31	June 29, 2012	1	3:33	Brasília, Brazil	
Loss	8–2	Carlos Eduardo	KO (punches)	Shooto Brazil 29	April 26, 2012	2	0:17	Rio de Janeiro, Brazil	For the Shooto Brazil Light Heavyweight Championship.
Loss	8–1	Mike Kyle	Decision (unanimous)	Strikeforce: Barnett vs. Kharitonov	September 10, 2011	3	5:00	Cincinnati, Ohio, United States	Light Heavyweight debut.
Win	8–0	Paulo Filho	Decision (unanimous)	First Class Fight 5	October 23, 2010	3	5:00	São Paulo, Brazil	
Win	7–0	Daniel Villegas	TKO (punches)	MFC 4: Chile vs. The World	September 4, 2010	N/A	N/A	Santiago, Chile	Heavyweight bout.
Win	6–0	Leonardo Lucio Nascimento	TKO (punches)	First Class Fight 4	June 30, 2010	2	N/A	São Paulo, Brazil	Heavyweight bout.
Win	5–0	Nelson Martins	TKO (submission to punches)	Nitrix Champion Fight 5	May 15, 2010	2	0:48	Balneário Camboriú, Brazil	
Win	4–0	Rafael Navas	TKO (punches)	Full Fight 2	October 24, 2009	1	3:49	São Paulo, Brazil	
Win	3–0	Silvério Bueno	KO (punch)	Ares Chaos MMA	October 17, 2009	1	0:39	São Paulo, Brazil	
Win	2–0	Antonio Conceição	KO (punch)	Renegade Fight Championship 3	September 19, 2009	1	1:55	Bebedouro, Brazil	
Win	1–0	Amauri Gumz	TKO (punches)	Renegade Fight Championship 1	March 14, 2009	1	N/A	Bebedouro, Brazil	

=== Mixed martial arts exhibition record ===
Exhibition record breakdown		
3 matches	2 wins	1 loss
By knockout	0	0
By submission	1	1
By decision	1	0
Draws	0	

Res.	Record	Opponent	Method	Event	Date	Round	Time	Location	Notes
Loss	2–1	Antônio Carlos Júnior	Submission (rear-naked choke)	The Ultimate Fighter: Brazil 3	May 20, 2014 (airdate)	1	3:22	São Paulo, Brazil	The Ultimate Fighter: Brazil 3 Semifinal Round.
Win	2–0	Jollyson Francisco	Decision (unanimous)	The Ultimate Fighter: Brazil 3	May 11, 2014 (airdate)	2	5:00	São Paulo, Brazil	The Ultimate Fighter: Brazil 3 Preliminary Round.
Win	1–0	Thiago Santos	Submission (guillotine choke)	The Ultimate Fighter: Brazil 3	March 16, 2014 (airdate)	1	N/A	São Paulo, Brazil	The Ultimate Fighter: Brazil 3 Elimination Round.

== See also ==
- List of male mixed martial artists
