= Dominick Reyes =

American mixed martial artist (born 1989)

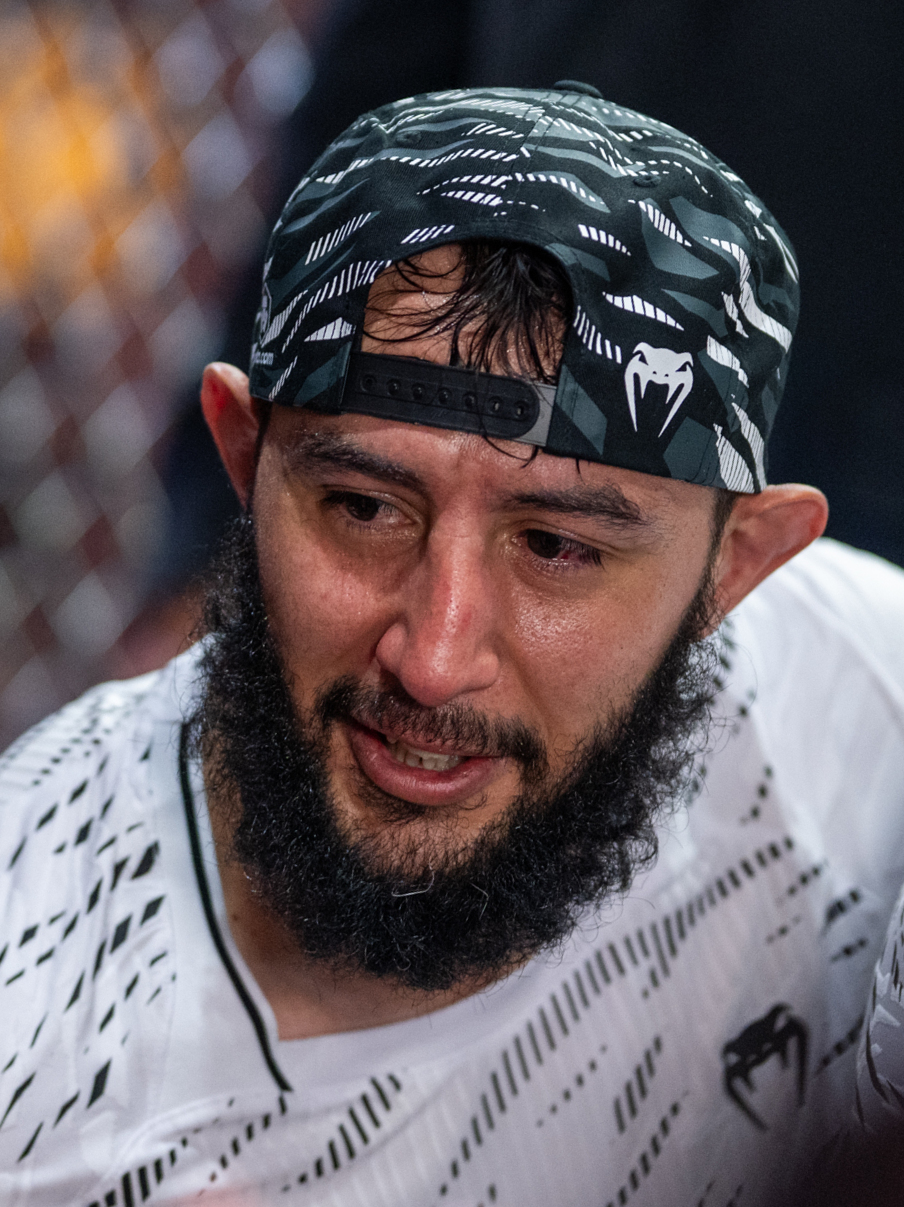
- Reyes in 2025
- Born: Dominick Vincent Reyes; December 26, 1989 (age 36); Hesperia, California, U.S.
- Nickname: The Devastator
- Height: 6 ft 4 in (193 cm)
- Weight: 205 lb (93 kg; 14 st 9 lb)
- Division: Light heavyweight (2014–present)
- Reach: 77 in (196 cm)
- Stance: Southpaw
- Fighting out of: Victorville, California, U.S.
- Team: Joe Stevensons Cobra Kai
- Rank: Blue belt in Brazilian Jiu-Jitsu
- Years active: 2014–present (MMA)

Mixed martial arts record
- Total: 22
- Wins: 17
- By knockout: 11
- By submission: 2
- By decision: 4
- Losses: 5
- By knockout: 4
- By decision: 1

Other information
- University: Stony Brook University
- Website: dominickreyes.com
- Mixed martial arts record from Sherdog

Dominick Vincent Reyes (born December 26, 1989) is an American professional mixed martial artist. He currently competes in the Light Heavyweight division of the Ultimate Fighting Championship (UFC). As of October 24, 2026, he is #4 in the Meta UFC light heavyweight rankings.

== Background ==
Reyes was born in Hesperia, California, on December 26, 1989, and is Mexican American. Reyes was an athlete from a young age: he wrestled and played American football, aspiring to play in the NFL. Reyes grew up in a poor family; his parents encouraged him to pursue sports in order to avoid getting involved with gangs. After graduating from Hesperia High School, he moved to New York to attend Stony Brook University, where he earned his B.S. in Information Systems.

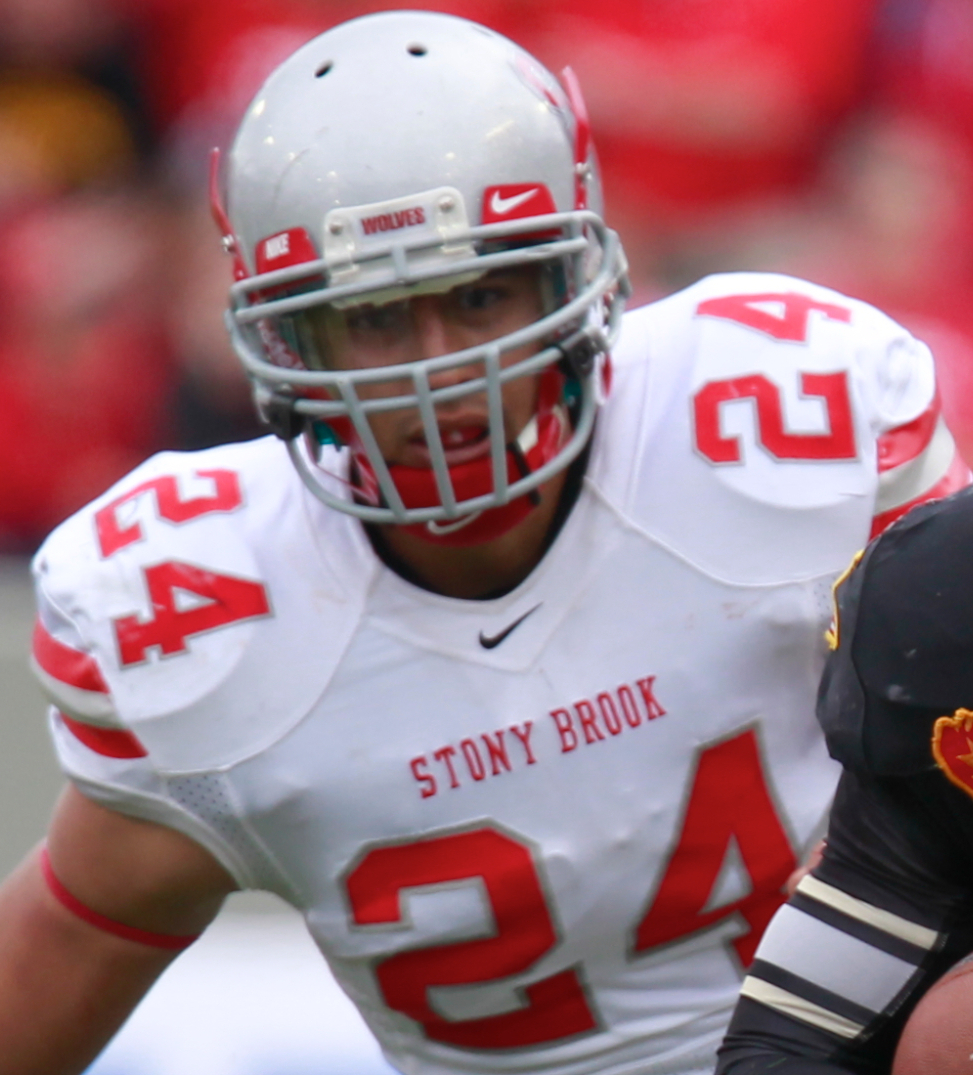
Reyes playing football for Stony Brook in 2012

Reyes was the starting safety for the Stony Brook Seawolves from 2009 to 2012, eventually becoming captain. He twice made the All-Conference team, including being named First Team All-Big South in 2012. He intercepted a pass in the end zone with 54 seconds remaining in the first round of the 2011 FCS Playoffs to give Stony Brook a 31–28 win over in-state rivals Albany. Reyes graduated from Stony Brook as the program's all-time leader in solo tackles (158), recording 259 tackles in total. While he received attention from NFL teams, his speed was deemed 'average' and he ultimately went undrafted in the 2013 NFL draft.

Although Reyes attended tryouts for the Canadian Football League afterwards, he had no desire to play for a league that was not top-level. Depressed about the apparent end to his NFL dreams, Reyes returned home to California and worked in construction. He would go on to work manual labor for his father's cabinetry business. He trained for MMA at Combat Cage Academy, his brother Alexander's gym, initially to stay in shape and vent frustration. Reyes started competing in amateur MMA fights shortly after.

In 2017, Reyes accepted a job as an IT Technical Support Specialist at Oak Hills High School in Oak Hills, California. He left the job after two years to focus on competition in the UFC full-time. ESPN's Hallie Grossman described his life during this time as "pulling Clark Kent-ish double duty: by day, he was the technology nerd who made sure the campus internet ran smoothly and installed new computers in classrooms. By night, he was the fighter trying to carve a place for himself in MMA, in King of the Cage and Legacy Fighting Alliance and eventually, finally, the UFC."

If I train hard and do what I have to do in order to prepare myself for an upcoming fight, I should be in position to win. With football, you can do everything right, and because of the variety of factors that’s involved in a game; the result may not go in your favor. With MMA, I feel I have a greater control of my destiny.

— Dominick Reyes

In 2026, Reyes was inducted into the Stony Brook Athletics Hall of Fame.

== Mixed martial arts career ==
=== Early career ===
Before turning professional, Reyes amassed an amateur record of 5–0 and was twice the U of MMA champion during his amateur career.

Prior to entering the UFC, Reyes amassed a professional record of 6–0 including a victory that went viral on the internet against Jordan Powell who seemed to be showboating before being knocked out with a head kick.

=== Ultimate Fighting Championship ===
Reyes made his promotional debut for the UFC on June 25, 2017, against Joachim Christensen at UFC Fight Night 112. He won the bout via technical knockout in the opening minute of the fight, and he earned the Performance of the Night bonus.

Reyes faced Jeremy Kimball on December 2, 2017, at UFC 218. Reyes won the fight via submission in the first round.

Reyes faced Jared Cannonier on May 19, 2018, at UFC Fight Night 129. He won the fight via TKO in the first round.

Reyes faced Ovince Saint Preux on October 6, 2018, at UFC 229. He won the fight via unanimous decision.

Reyes faced Volkan Oezdemir on March 16, 2019, at UFC Fight Night 147. Reyes won the back-and-forth fight by split decision. 11 media outlets scored the fight in favor of Oezdemir while 8 media outlets scored it for Reyes.

Reyes faced Chris Weidman on October 18, 2019, at UFC on ESPN 6 in the main event. He won the fight via knockout in round one. This win earned him the Performance of the Night award.

Reyes faced Jon Jones on February 8, 2020, for the UFC Light Heavyweight Championship at UFC 247. He lost the fight via a controversial unanimous decision. 14 of 21 media outlets scored the contest for Reyes, with 7 scoring it for Jones.

Reyes faced Jan Błachowicz for the vacant UFC Light Heavyweight Championship on September 27, 2020, at UFC 253. He lost the fight via technical knockout in the second round.

Reyes was expected to face the inaugural and former Rizin FF Light Heavyweight Champion Jiří Procházka on February 27, 2021, at UFC Fight Night 186 to serve as the event headliner. However, on late January, it was reported that Reyes was pulled from the fight, citing injury, and the bout was rescheduled for May 1 at UFC on ESPN: Reyes vs. Procházka. In a back and forth fight, Reyes managed to stun Procházka a few times, but was eventually overwhelmed by Procházka's volume, and was knocked out via a spinning back elbow in the second round. Reyes suffered multiple facial fractures in his knockout defeat to Procházka. This bout earned Reyes a Fight of the Night bonus award.

Reyes faced Ryan Spann on November 12, 2022, at UFC 281. At the weigh-ins, Spann weighed in at 206.6 pounds, six tenths of a pound over the light heavyweight non-title fight limit. The bout proceeded at a catchweight with Spann fined 20% of his purse, which went to Reyes. He lost the fight via knockout in the first round.

Reyes was scheduled to face Carlos Ulberg on January 20, 2024, at UFC 297. However, in late December 2023, it was announced that match was off due to an injury sustained by Ulberg. The pair was rescheduled to meet at UFC on ESPN 54 on March 30, 2024. However, on January 23, it was announced that Reyes had withdrawn from the fight and was replaced by Alonzo Menifield.

Reyes faced Dustin Jacoby on June 8, 2024, at UFC on ESPN 57. He won the fight by technical knockout in the first round from a knee and punches.

Reyes faced former UFC Light Heavyweight Championship title challenger Anthony Smith on December 7, 2024 at UFC 310. He won the fight by technical knockout via elbows and punches in the second round.

Reyes faced Nikita Krylov on April 12, 2025 at UFC 314. He won the fight by knockout in the first round after landing a left, straight punch.

Reyes faced Carlos Ulberg in the main event on September 28, 2025 at UFC Fight Night 260. He lost the fight via knockout in round one.

Reyes faced Johnny Walker on April 11, 2026 at UFC 327. He won the fight via split decision. 11 out of 16 media outlets scored the contest for Reyes.

Reyes faced Azamat Murzakanov on October 24, 2026 at UFC 333. He won the fight via knockout via a head kick and a punch in the first round.

== Personal life ==
Reyes was nicknamed "The Devastator" because of his kicks. He is a fan of the Los Angeles Lakers and Los Angeles Dodgers and he enjoys snowboarding, wakeboarding, mountain bike riding, dirt bike riding, and watching documentary shows on TV. Reyes has an older brother, Alex Reyes, who competes in the Lightweight division of the Ultimate Fighting Championship.

Reyes married on January 11, 2025. He became a father to a son on December 11, 2025.

== Championships and accomplishments ==
- Ultimate Fighting Championship
  - Performance of the Night (Two times) vs. Joachim Christensen and Chris Weidman
  - Fight of the Night (One time) vs. Jiří Procházka
  - Tied (Khalil Rountree Jr., Dustin Jacoby & Magomed Ankalaev) for third most knockouts in UFC Light Heavyweight division history (7)
  - Third largest strike differential in a UFC Light Heavyweight bout (+100) (vs. Anthony Smith)
  - UFC Honors Awards
    - 2021: President's Choice Fight of the Year Nominee vs. Jiří Procházka
  - UFC.com Awards
    - 2017: Ranked #9 Newcomer of the Year
    - 2020: Ranked #9 Fight of the Year vs. Jon Jones
    - 2021: Half-Year Awards: Best Fight of the 1HY vs. Jiří Procházka & Ranked #5 Fight of the Year vs. Jiří Procházka
- MMA Fighting
  - 2024 Third Team MMA All-Star

== Mixed martial arts record ==
Professional record breakdown
22 matches	17 wins	5 losses
By knockout	11	4
By submission	2	0
By decision	4	1

Res.	Record	Opponent	Method	Event	Date	Round	Time	Location	Notes
Win	17–5	Azamat Murzakanov	TKO (head kick and punches)	UFC 333	October 24, 2026	1	2:40	Abu Dhabi, United Arab Emirates	
Win	16–5	Johnny Walker	Decision (split)	UFC 327	April 11, 2026	3	5:00	Miami, Florida, United States	
Loss	15–5	Carlos Ulberg	KO (punches)	UFC Fight Night: Ulberg vs. Reyes	September 28, 2025	1	4:27	Perth, Australia	
Win	15–4	Nikita Krylov	KO (punch)	UFC 314	April 12, 2025	1	2:24	Miami, Florida, United States	
Win	14–4	Anthony Smith	TKO (elbows and punches)	UFC 310	December 7, 2024	2	4:46	Las Vegas, Nevada, United States	
Win	13–4	Dustin Jacoby	KO (punches)	UFC on ESPN: Cannonier vs. Imavov	June 8, 2024	1	2:00	Louisville, Kentucky, United States	
Loss	12–4	Ryan Spann	KO (punches)	UFC 281	November 12, 2022	1	1:20	New York City, New York, United States	Catchweight (206.6 lb) bout; Spann missed weight.
Loss	12–3	Jiří Procházka	KO (spinning back elbow)	UFC on ESPN: Reyes vs. Procházka	May 1, 2021	2	4:29	Las Vegas, Nevada, United States	Fight of the Night.
Loss	12–2	Jan Błachowicz	TKO (punches)	UFC 253	September 27, 2020	2	4:36	Abu Dhabi, United Arab Emirates	For the vacant UFC Light Heavyweight Championship.
Loss	12–1	Jon Jones	Decision (unanimous)	UFC 247	February 8, 2020	5	5:00	Houston, Texas, United States	For the UFC Light Heavyweight Championship.
Win	12–0	Chris Weidman	KO (punches)	UFC on ESPN: Reyes vs. Weidman	October 18, 2019	1	1:43	Boston, Massachusetts, United States	Performance of the Night.
Win	11–0	Volkan Oezdemir	Decision (split)	UFC Fight Night: Till vs. Masvidal	March 16, 2019	3	5:00	London, England	
Win	10–0	Ovince Saint Preux	Decision (unanimous)	UFC 229	October 6, 2018	3	5:00	Las Vegas, Nevada, United States	
Win	9–0	Jared Cannonier	TKO (punches)	UFC Fight Night: Maia vs. Usman	May 19, 2018	1	2:55	Santiago, Chile	
Win	8–0	Jeremy Kimball	Submission (rear-naked choke)	UFC 218	December 2, 2017	1	3:39	Detroit, Michigan, United States	
Win	7–0	Joachim Christensen	TKO (punches)	UFC Fight Night: Chiesa vs. Lee	June 25, 2017	1	0:29	Oklahoma City, Oklahoma, United States	Performance of the Night.
Win	6–0	Jordan Powell	KO (head kick)	LFA 13	June 2, 2017	1	0:53	Burbank, California, United States	
Win	5–0	Marcus Govan	KO (head kick)	Hoosier Fight Club 32	February 11, 2017	1	0:27	Michigan City, Indiana, United States	
Win	4–0	Tyler Smith	TKO (punches)	KOTC: Martial Law	September 18, 2016	1	1:35	Ontario, California, United States	
Win	3–0	Kelly Gray	Decision (unanimous)	KOTC: Sinister Intentions	October 17, 2015	3	5:00	Las Vegas, Nevada, United States	
Win	2–0	Jessie Glass	Submission (guillotine choke)	Gladiator Challenge: Carnage	April 3, 2015	1	0:55	Rancho Mirage, California, United States	
Win	1–0	Jose Rivas Jr.	TKO (punches)	KOTC: Fisticuffs	December 4, 2014	1	3:23	Highland, California, United States	Light Heavyweight debut.

== Pay-per-view bouts ==
No.	Event	Fight	Date	Venue	City	PPV Buys
1.	UFC 247	Jones vs. Reyes	February 8, 2020	Toyota Center	Houston, Texas, United States	Not Disclosed

== See also ==
- List of current UFC fighters
- List of male mixed martial artists
