= Joachim Christensen =

Danish mixed martial arts fighter

- Born: November 7, 1978 (age 47); Copenhagen, Denmark
- Nationality: Danish
- Height: 6 ft 3 in (1.91 m)
- Weight: 204 lb (93 kg; 14 st 8 lb)
- Division: Light Heavyweight (205 lb)
- Reach: 76 in (193 cm)
- Style: Boxing, Wrestling, BJJ
- Fighting out of: Copenhagen, Denmark
- Team: Arte Suave
- Rank: Black belt in Brazilian jiu-jitsu
- Years active: 2007–present

Mixed martial arts record
- Total: 24
- Wins: 15
- By knockout: 5
- By submission: 5
- By decision: 5
- Losses: 9
- By knockout: 3
- By submission: 3
- By decision: 3

Other information
- Mixed martial arts record from Sherdog

Joachim Christensen (born November 7, 1978) is a Danish retired mixed martial artist. He was the Superior Challenge light heavyweight champion, as well as the German Mixed Martial Arts Championship (GMC) light heavyweight champion. He also competed in the light heavyweight division of the Ultimate Fighting Championship (UFC). He currently signed to Absolute Championship Berkut (ACB).

== Background ==
Christensen was born and raised in Copenhagen, Denmark. He worked as a social worker and served in the Denmark Army while fighting professionally.

== Mixed martial arts career ==
=== Early career ===
Christensen fought in European fight circuit and Middle East MMA promotions such as Adrenaline, Fighter Gala and Royal Arena promotions, Hard Fighting Championship, Cage, European MMA, Superior Challenge, German MMA, Abu Dhabi Warriors and M1 Challenge prior joining UFC. He was the Scandinavian and European C-Shoto champion.

=== Ultimate Fighting Championship ===
After being one of the top ranked light heavyweight fighter in Europe, Christensen was signed by UFC on late 2016 at the age of 37. Christensen amassed a record of 14-3-0 prior signed by Ultimate Fighting Championship (UFC).

==== 2016 ====
Christensen made his promotional debut at October 1, 2016, at UFC Fight Night: Lineker vs. Dodson. He lost the fight to Henrique da Silva after da Silva locked an arm bar and submitted him.

==== 2017 ====
Christensen next faced Bojan Mihajlović at UFC Fight Night: Rodríguez vs. Penn on January 17, 2017. He won the fight after threw an upper cut and knocked out Mihajlović on round three.

On May 13, 2017, Christensen faced Gadzhimurad Antigulov at UFC 211. He lost the fight via rear-naked choke on round one.

Christensen was expected to face promotional newcomer Azamat Murzakanov on June 25, 2017, at UFC Fight Night: Chiesa vs. Lee. However, Murzakanov was removed from the fight for undisclosed reasons and replaced by Dominick Reyes. Christensen lost the fight via TKO on round one.

=== Absolute Championship Berkut ===
Christensen joined Absolute Championship Berkut (ABC) and his debut was on November 24, 2017, at ACB 75: Gadzhidaudov vs. Zieliński against Döwletjan Ýaşgymyradow from Turkmenistan. He lost the fight on round one via knock out.

=== Return To German MMA Championship ===
After a one fight stint in ACB, Christensen returned to the GMC and faced Stephan Puetz for the GMC light heavyweight championship on March 23, 2019, at GMC 19 in Munich, Germany. He lost the fight via submission in the second round.

=== European circuit ===
Christensen faced Miloš Petrášek at Oktagon 15 on November 9, 2019. He won the fight via majority decision.

Christensen was scheduled to face Łukasz Sudolski undr Babilon MMA at Babilon MMA 20 on March 26, 2021. He pulled out of the bout after falling sick the day of the bout.

Christensen faced Evgeniy Erokhin at an Parus FC event on November 6, 2021. He lost the bout via ground and pound in the first round.

== Championships and accomplishments ==
=== Mixed martial arts ===
- Superior Challenge
  - Light Heavyweight Champion (One times) vs. Matti Makela
    - One successful title defense vs. Max Nunes
- German MMA Championship
  - Won the German MMA Championship Light Heavyweight title (One time) vs. Jonas Billstein

== Mixed martial arts record ==
Professional record breakdown
24 matches	15 wins	9 losses
By knockout	5	3
By submission	5	3
By decision	5	3

Res.	Record	Opponent	Method	Event	Date	Round	Time	Location	Notes
Loss	15–9	Evgeny Erokhin	TKO (punches)	MFP Parus Fight Championship	November 6, 2021	1	4:34	Dubai, United Arab Emirates	For the Parus FC Light Heavyweight Championship
Win	15–8	Miloš Petrášek	Decision (majority)	Oktagon 15	November 9, 2019	3	5:00	Prague, Czech Republic	
Loss	14–8	Stephan Puetz	Submission (arm-triangle choke)	German MMA Championship 19	March 23, 2019	2	4:50	Munich, Germany	For the GMC Light Heavyweight Championship.
Loss	14–7	Dovletdzhan Yagshimuradov	KO (punches)	ACB 75: Gadzhidaudov vs. Zieliński	November 25, 2017	1	1:14	Stuttgart, Germany	
Loss	14–6	Dominick Reyes	TKO (punches)	UFC Fight Night: Chiesa vs. Lee	June 25, 2017	1	0:29	Oklahoma City, Oklahoma, United States	
Loss	14–5	Gadzhimurad Antigulov	Submission (rear-naked choke)	UFC 211	May 13, 2017	1	2:21	Dallas, Texas, United States	
Win	14–4	Bojan Mihajlović	TKO (punches)	UFC Fight Night: Rodríguez vs. Penn	January 15, 2017	3	2:05	Phoenix, Arizona, United States	
Loss	13–4	Henrique da Silva	Submission (armbar)	UFC Fight Night: Lineker vs. Dodson	October 1, 2016	2	4:47	Portland, Oregon, United States	
Win	13–3	Anthony Ruiz	Submission (armbar)	Abu Dhabi Warriors 4	May 24, 2016	1	4:47	Abu Dhabi, United Arab Emirates	
Win	12–3	Jonas Billstein	TKO (punches)	German MMA Championship 7	November 7, 2015	1	0:59	Castrop-Rauxel, Germany	Won the GMC Light Heavyweight Championship.
Win	11–3	Max Nunes	Decision (split)	Superior Challenge 12	May 16, 2015	3	5:00	Malmö, Sweden	Defended the SC Light Heavyweight Championship.
Win	10–3	Matti Makela	Decision (Split)	Superior Challenge 10	May 3, 2014	3	5:00	Helsingborg, Sweden	Won the vacant SC Light Heavyweight Championship.
Win	9–3	Stephan Puetz	Decision (Split)	European MMA 8	February 22, 2014	3	5:00	Hovedstaden, Denmark	
Loss	8–3	Marcus Vänttinen	Decision (Split)	Cage 23	September 21, 2013	3	5:00	Vantaa, Finland	For the Cage Light Heavyweight Championship.
Win	8–2	Matti Makela	Decision (unanimous)	Royal Arena 2	August 31, 2012	3	5:00	Copenhagen, Denmark	
Loss	7–2	Maxim Grishin	Decision (Majority)	M-1 Challenge 32	May 16, 2012	3	5:00	Moscow, Russia	
Win	7–1	Wojciech Antczak	Submission (rear-naked choke)	Royal Arena 1	March 10, 2012	1	2:15	Hovedstaden, Denmark	
Win	6–1	Pierre Guillet	Submission (arm-triangle choke)	Fighter Gala 23	October 1, 2011	3	3:55	Copenhagen, Denmark	
Win	5–1	Ivan Gluhak	KO (punch)	Hard Fighting Championship 3	May 6, 2011	2	3:12	Martigny, Switzerland	
Win	4–1	Rowan Tol	TKO (punches)	Fighter Gala 16	October 2, 2010	1	4:55	Helsingør, Denmark	
Loss	3–1	Juha Saarinen	Decision (unanimous)	Adrenaline 4: The New Generation	February 13, 2010	3	5:00	Copenhagen, Denmark	
Win	3–0	Marek Pilar	TKO (punches)	Fighter Gala 9	August 30, 2009	1	2:18	Hovedstaden, Denmark	
Win	2–0	Michael Bender	Submission (arm triangle choke)	Adrenaline 2: Rise of the Champions	April 12, 2008	1	1:42	Denmark	
Win	1–0	Alex Landoni	Submission (triangle choke)	Adrenaline 1: Feel the Rush	May 5, 2007	1	5:00	Hvidovre, Denmark	

== See also ==
- List of current UFC fighters
- List of male mixed martial artists
