= Dygulybgey =

Rural locality of Russia

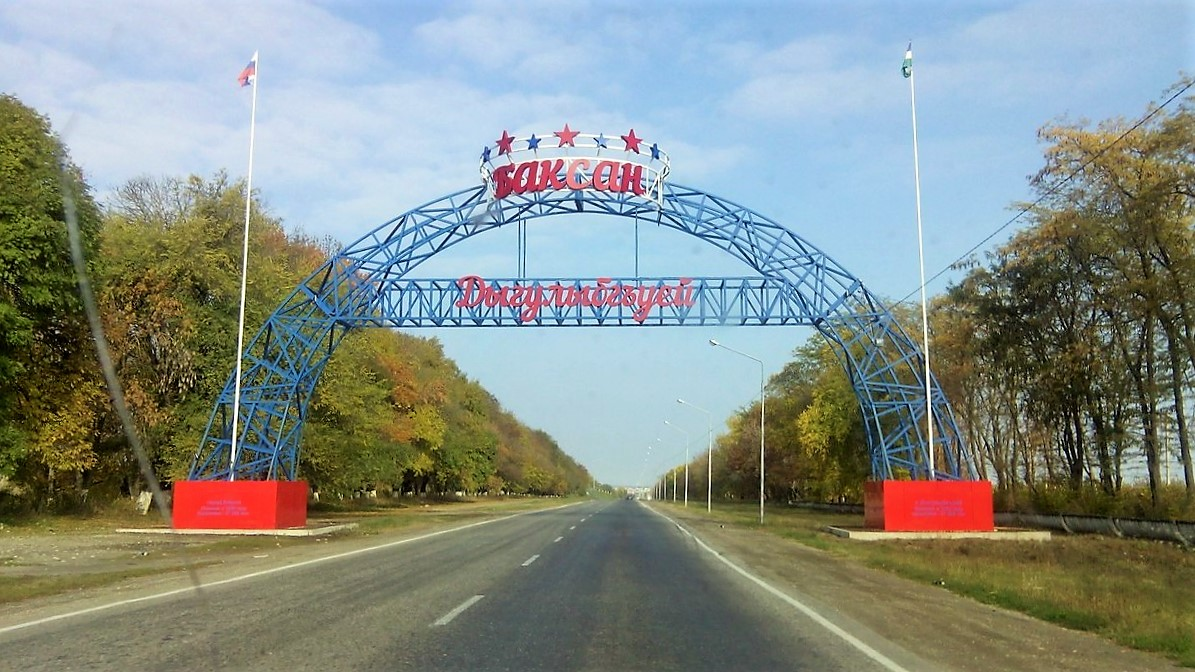
- Interactive map of Dygulybgey
- Location of Dygulybgey
- Coordinates: 43°39′N 43°33′E
- Country: Russia
- Federal subject: Kabardino-Balkaria
- Founded: 1597
- Elevation: 505 m (1,657 ft)

Population
  - Estimate (2025): 21,144 )
- Time zone: UTC+3 (MSK)
- Postal code: 361501
- OKTMO ID: 83703000106
- Website: www.gb.adm-kbr.ru

Dygulybgey (Russian: Дыгулыбгей; Kabardian: Дыгулыбгъуей, romanized: Dəguləbğwej) is a rural locality (a selo) under the administrative jurisdiction of the town of republic significance of Baksan in the Kabardino-Balkar Republic, Russia. It is located along the northern border of Georgia. Population: 20,228 (2010 census); 20,355 (2002 census). In 2002, 98.9% of population were ethnic Circassians from the Kabarday tribe.

Kabardino-Balkarian Republic, is home to four mosques, several schools and cultural institutions, and an agro-industrial economy. Located in the Baksan urban district, the village boasts an array of facilities, including a dental center, sports and recreation complex, and multiple schools named after notable figures in local history.

== History ==
=== 16th Century: The Beginning of Diplomatic Relations ===
The first mention of Dygulybgey dates back to the 16th century, during the beginning of diplomatic relations between the Circassians (Circassians) and Russians. At that time, the village was known as Tambiyevo, named after its founder, the Kabardian vuork (nobleman) Dugulubg Tambiev. Tambiyevo was a small settlement with a few dozen households.

=== 19th Century: A Village Named After Its Owner ===
In the middle of the 19th century, Tambiyevo was named after its owner, Lieutenant Zarakush Tambiev. During this time, the village was a thriving community with a population of over a thousand people. However, the population decreased sharply during the Caucasian War due to the Circassian genocide, which subsequently forced many to flee to the Ottoman Empire.

=== 1865: Land Reform and Enlargement of Villages ===
In 1865, during the Land reform of Kabarda and the program for the enlargement of Kabardian villages, the aul of Berd Tambiev and the aul of Shakmanei were attached to the aul of Zarakusha Tambiev (the then owner of the aul).

=== 1920: Renaming Due to the Presence of Princely and Noble Surnames ===
In 1920, with the final establishment of Soviet power in Kabarda, Tambiyevo, like other Kabardian settlements, was renamed due to the presence of princely and noble surnames in their names. The village received a new name - Kyzburun III.

=== World War II: Occupation and Liberation ===
During the Great Patriotic War, in October 1942, the village was occupied by German troops. In January 1943, the village was liberated from the Nazi invaders.

=== 1993: Return to Historical Name ===
In 1993, the village was returned to its historical name Dugulubgey, on behalf of the founder of the village - Dugulubg Tambiev.

=== 2003: Inclusion in the City of Baksan ===
In 2003, the village of Dugulubgey and the village administration of the same name were abolished and included in the city of Baksan.

=== 2008: Return to the Status of a Village ===
In 2008, after numerous requests from residents, Dugulubgey was returned to the status of a village, but as part of an urban district. At the same time, the name of the village was transformed into Dygulybgey.

=== Modern Times: Local Administration and Self-Government ===
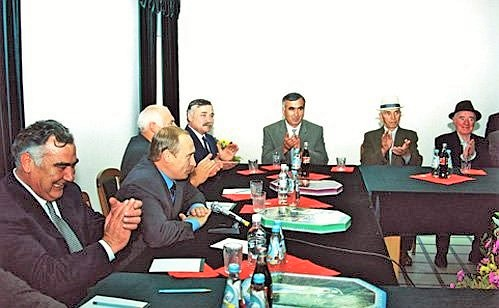
Vladimir Putin with the elders of the village of Dugulubgey (2001)

Now, the village of Dygulybgey is administratively part of the urban district of the city of Baksan, and has a local administration (territorial executive district) and local self-government in the form of the Council of Elders.

== Geography ==
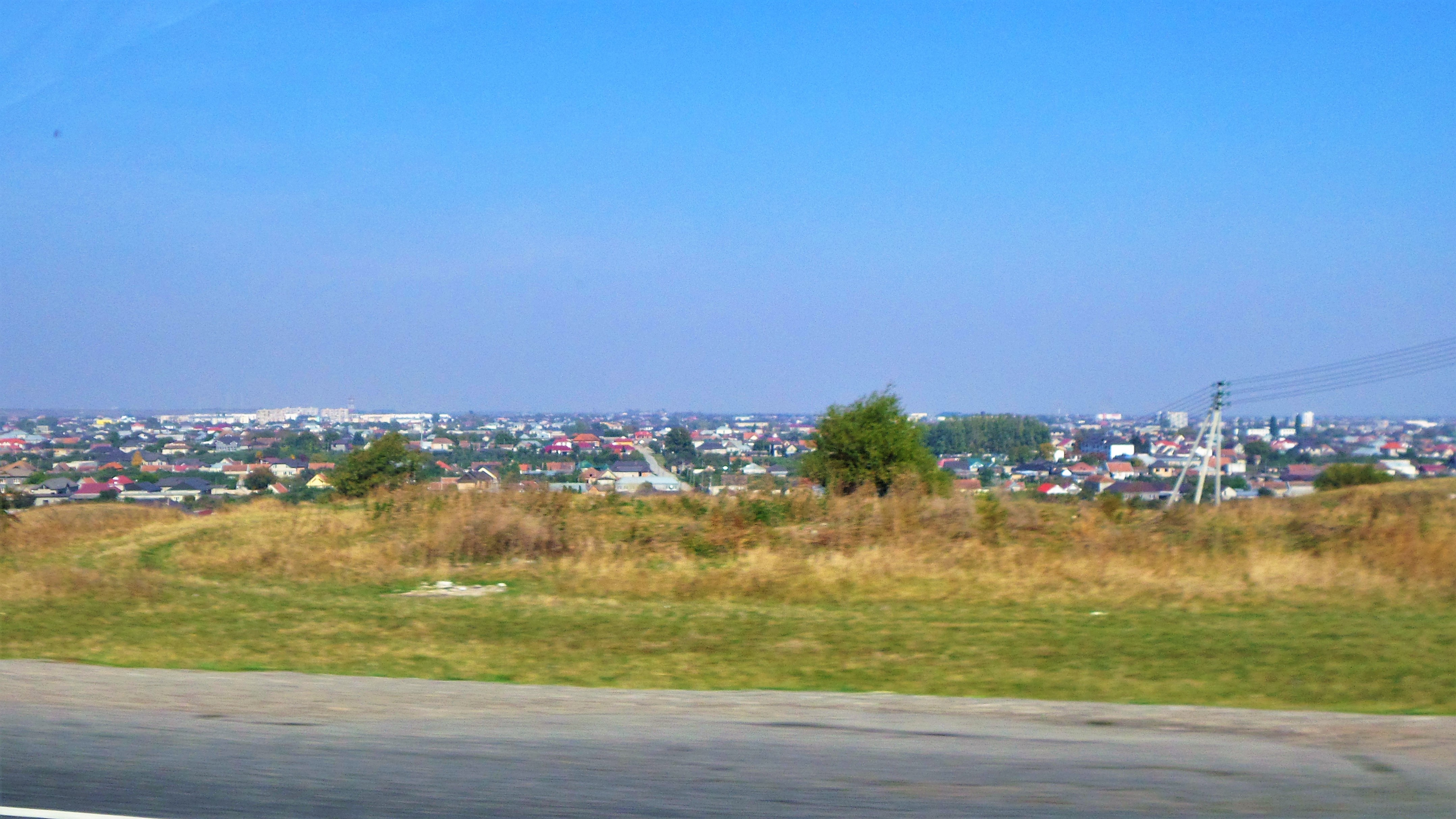
View of the village from the highway "Kavkaz"

Dygulybgei is located on the right bank of the Baksan River in the foothill zone of the Republic of Kabardino-Balkaria, Russia. The village is situated at the exit of the Baksan River from the gorge to the foothill plain. The northern part of the village merges with the city of Baksan and is separated from it by the Baksan River. Dygulybgei is located 18 km northwest of the city of Nalchik.

The federal highway "Kavkaz" M 29 passes along the southwestern outskirts of the village. Its bypass road passes through the center of the village, going through the city of Baksan. The regional highway A-158 "Prokhladny-Baksan-Elbrus", leading to the Elbrus National Park, runs along the northern and western outskirts of the village.

The settlement has a territory of 15.30 km^{2} and borders the lands of settlements such as Baksan in the north, Baksanyonok in the northeast, Kishpek in the east, Chegem II in the south, and Islamey in the west.

The average height in the village is 505 meters above sea level. The relief of the area is a foothill sloping plain, surrounded in the southwest by hills with cliffs. Further south of the village, the northern spurs of the Pasture Range begin to rise. The highest point in the vicinity of the village is the Mahogaps massif, located to the southwest of the settlement and reaching absolute heights of up to 1000 meters above sea level. The bowels of the territory of the village are composed of a thick layer of alluvial boulder-pebbles with sandy filling. Groundwater is located at a depth of 10–15 meters.

The hydrographic network is mainly represented by the Baksan River, which passes through the village. Its right tributary, Kishpek (Tyzhuko), flows into Baksan at the eastern outskirts of the village. Several flow channels of the Baksan River pass through the village itself, and there are also several artificial reservoirs.

The climate in Dygulybgei is humid temperate, with warm summers and cool winters. The average annual air temperature is about +9.5°С, and ranges from an average of +21.5°С in July to an average of −3.0°С in January. The average daily air temperature ranges from −10°С to +15°С in winter, and from +16°С to +30°С in summer. The average annual rainfall is about 650 mm. In early spring, with sudden changes in temperature, strong winds blow from the mountains.

== Demography ==
Historical population
Year	Pop.	±%
1979	11,020	—
2002	20,355	+84.7%
2010	20,228	−0.6%
2011	20,243	+0.1%
2012	20,271	+0.1%
2013	20,206	−0.3%
2015	20,349	+0.7%
2016	20,387	+0.2%
2017	20,462	+0.4%
2018	20,553	+0.4%
2019	20,619	+0.3%
2020	20,718	+0.5%
2021	20,852	+0.6%

The population density is 1362.88 people / km^{2}.

=== Ethnic composition ===
Ethnic group		Percentage of Population (2001 Census)
Kabardians	20,032	99.0%
Other	196	1.0%
Total	20,228	100%

=== Gender and age composition ===
Age	Men	Women	Total number of people	Share of total population %
0 – 14 years	2,442	2,439	4,881	24,1 %
15 – 59 years	6,460	6,739	13,199	65,3 %
from 60 years	886	1,262	2,148	10,6 %
Total	9,788	10,440	20,228	100%

Women make up the majority of the population at 51.6%, while men account for 48.4%. The average age of the population is 31.8 years, with a median age of 28.7 years. The average age of men is slightly lower than that of women, at 31.1 years and 32.5 years, respectively.

== Local government and administration ==
The administration of Dygulybgei operates as the territorial executive body of the Baksan urban district and is responsible for carrying out executive and administrative functions within the village. The administration is located at st. Baksanova, 32 in the village of Dygulybgei.

The local self-government structure of the village includes two bodies: the executive and administrative body, which is the local administration of the village, and the representative body, which is the Council of Local Self-Government "Council of Elders." The head of the local administration of the village is Akhmed Sergeevich Akhiev, while the Chairman of the Council of Local Self-Government "Council of Elders" is Anatoly Zabubovich Arvanov.
